= 1908–09 Kangaroo tour of Great Britain =

Rugby league tour (1908–1909)

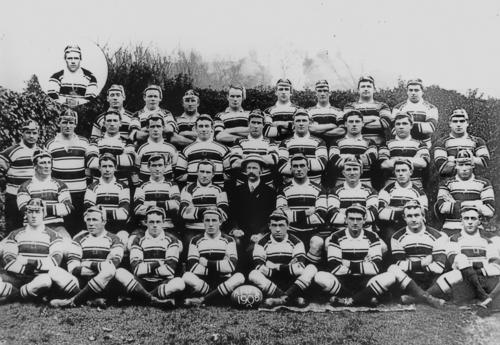
- The pioneer Kangaroos squad of 1908–09
- Date: 3 October 1908 – 8 March 1909
- Manager: J. J. Giltinan
- Tour captain(s): Denis Lutge
- Top point scorer(s): Dally Messenger (155)
- Top test try scorer(s): Jim Devereux (3)
Summary
P	W	D	L
Total
45	19	6	20
Test match
3	0	1	2
Opponent
P	W	D	L
Great Britain
3	0	1	2

Tour chronology
- Next tour: 1911–12

The 1908–09 Kangaroo tour of Great Britain was the first ever such tour for the newly-formed Australia national rugby league team (or 'The Kangaroos'). The tour was to England and Wales and coincided with the first Wallabies Rugby Union tour of Great Britain, which in hindsight put the Kangaroos in a tough position. The game of rugby league was not yet twelve months old in Australia however a New Zealand side had already toured to Britain (the All Golds in 1907), Australia had encountered New Zealand during the 1908 season and the pioneer Australian leaders of the game were keen to match up against the Northern Union founders of the code.

The 1908–09 Kangaroos wore jumpers of sky blue and maroon representing the New South Wales Blues and Queensland Maroons players that comprised the team. The first Kangaroo tour was considered a financial failure, with poor weather and economic conditions contributing to smaller than expected gate takings. Tour promoter James Giltinan was bankrupted as result. However for almost a century afterward, Kangaroo tours took place every four years and involved a three-Test Ashes series against Great Britain (under the name Northern Union) and a number of tour matches. The 1908-09 tour was later depicted in the 1988 Australian television movie The First Kangaroos.

== The tour ==
=== Itinerary ===
The Kangaroos sailed for Britain on RMS Macedonia prior to the close of the 1908 NSWRFL season, denying some of the selected players to appear in the inaugural grand final. They worked as stokers to keep their fitness levels up as well as doing daily sessions in the ship's gymnasium and boxing ring. The jerseys were coloured sky blue and maroon, combining the state colours of NSW and Queensland respectively. When tour captain, Lutge was injured early in the tour, Messenger became captain in the 1st and 2nd Test Matches. After he was injured, Alec Burdon assumed the captaincy for the 3rd Test. One of the players Pat Walsh sailed to Britain separately on the ship, Salamis and brought the live Kangaroo mascot with him. Walsh arrived in England for the 5th match of the tour against Salford.The team's live marsupial mascot died before the end of the tour due to the execrable weather.

The Kangaroos scored some memorable victories, including wins against Yorkshire, Lancashire and Hunslet (featuring their fearsome forwards "The Terrible Six"). Rugby league made its first appearance in Scotland in 1909 when Glasgow’s Celtic Park hosted a game between the Northern Rugby Football Union representative side and the touring Australians.

=== Results ===
Matches played: 45 Won: 17 Drew: 6 Lost: 22
The Ashes: Great Britain 2-0.
Leading try scorers of the tour were Devereaux 17, Messenger 10, Frawley 10, Walsh 9, Courtney 8.
Dally Messenger was the tourists' leading point-scorer with 160, a full 103 points clear of next highest-scorer.

N°	Opposing Team	F	A	Date	Venue	Attendance	Status
1	Mid-Rhondda	20	6	3 October 1908	King George's Field, Tonypandy	7,500	Tour match
2	Bradford Northern	12	11	7 October 1908	Valley Parade, Bradford	4,000	Tour match
3	Rochdale Hornets	5	0	10 October 1908	Athletic Grounds, Rochdale	3,000	Tour match
4	York	5	5	14 October 1908	Clarence Street, York	1,781	Tour match
5	Salford	9	9	17 October 1908	The Willows, Salford	6,100	Tour match
6	Runcorn	9	7	21 October 1908	Canal Street, Runcorn	2,700	Tour match
7	(Cumbria) Cumberland	52	10	24 October 1908	Recreation Ground, Whitehaven	4,000	Tour match
8	Leigh	11	14	28 October 1908	Mather Lane, Leigh	6,000	Tour match
9	Dewsbury	0	15	31 October 1908	Old Crown Flatt ground, Dewsbury	2,000	Tour match
10	Yorkshire	24	11	5 November 1908	The Boulevard, Hull	3,500	Tour match
11	Hunslet	12	11	7 November 1908	Parkside, Hunslet	6,000	Tour match
12	Aberdare	37	10	10 November 1908	Athletic Ground, Aberdare	5,000	Tour match
13	Warrington	3	10	14 November 1908	Wilderspool, Warrington	5,000	Tour match
14	Northern Union XIII	10	9	18 November 1908	Goodison Park, Liverpool	6,000	Tour match
15	Hull Kingston Rovers	16	21	21 November 1908	Craven Street, Hull	7,000	Tour match
16	Lancashire	20	6	25 November 1908	Central Park, Wigan	4,000	Tour match
17	Barrow	21	5	28 November 1908	Cavendish Park, Barrow	6,500	Tour match
18	Halifax	8	12	5 December 1908	Thrum Hall, Halifax	6,000	Tour match
19	Swinton	10	9	9 December 1908	Chorley Road, Swinton	1,500	Tour match
20	(United Kingdom) Northern Union	22	22	12 December 1908	Park Royal Ground, London	2,000	Test match
21	Treherbert	6	3	16 December 1908	Athletic Ground, Treherbert	4,000	Tour match
22	Wakefield Trinity	13	20	20 December 1908	Belle Vue, Wakefield	3,000	Tour match
23	Leeds	14	10	25 December 1908	Headingley, Leeds	12,000	Tour match
24	Oldham	5	11	28 December 1908	Watersheddings, Oldham	11,800	Tour match
25	Northern Union XIII	9	14	2 January 1909	Fartown, Huddersfield	7,000	Tour match
26	Widnes	13	2	6 January 1909	Lowerhouse Lane, Widnes	1,000	Tour match
27	Wigan	15	7	9 January 1909	Central Park, Wigan	4,000	Tour match
28	Batley	5	12	12 January 1909	Mount Pleasant, Batley	5,735	Tour match
29	Welsh League XIII	13	14	16 January 1909	Penydarren Park, Merthyr Tydfil	6,000	Tour match
30	Ebbw Vale	9	8	18 January 1909	Bridge End Field, Ebbw Vale	5,000	Tour match
31	Wigan	8	16	20 January 1909	Central Park, Wigan	9,100	Tour match
32	(United Kingdom) Northern Union	5	15	23 January 1909	St James' Park, Newcastle	22,000	Test match
33	Keighley	8	8	26 January 1909	Lawkholme Lane, Keighley	1,000	Tour match
34	Hull F.C.	9	8	30 January 1909	The Boulevard, Hull	10,000	Tour match
35	Northern Union XIII	17	17	3 February 1909	Celtic Park, Glasgow	3,000	Tour match
36	(Cumbria) Cumberland	2	11	4 February 1909	Devonshire Park, Carlisle	2,000	Tour match
37	Broughton Rangers	12	14	6 February 1909	Wheater's Field, Broughton, Salford	12,000	Tour match
38	Warrington	8	8	8 February 1909	Wilderspool, Warrington	7,000	Tour match
39	St. Helens	12	14	6 February 1909	Knowsley Road, St. Helens	1,500	Tour match
40	(United Kingdom) Northern Union	5	6	10 February 1909	Villa Park, Birmingham	9,000	Test match
41	Huddersfield	5	3	20 February 1909	Fartown, Huddersfield	9,700	Tour match
42	Barrow	3	11	22 February 1909	Cavendish Park, Barrow	6,000	Tour match
43	Merthyr Tydfil	13	15	27 February 1909	Penydarren Park, Merthyr Tydfil	4,000	Tour match
44	Northern Union XIII	7	14	3 March 1909	Goodison Park, Liverpool	3,000	Tour match
45	Lancashire	14	19	8 March 1909	Wheater's Field, Broughton, Salford	4,000	Tour match

=== Financial difficulties ===
The seven-month tour proved to be a true test of survival and was almost a disaster due to small gate-takings. A crippling cotton mill strike in northern England made it difficult for many fans to afford their way through the turnstiles and there was criticism of the entry price the Australians wanted to charge. Australian morale ebbed during one of the meanest northern winters on record.

We are having nothing but rain, snow, sleet and cold... why, you cannot feel your hands and feet and the referees are cruel, don't give us anything at all.
James Giltinan, Tour Manager wrote home in 1908

Giltinan as promoter of the tour had borrowed £2,000 to fund the operation and took the full risk. He paid the players a weekly allowance of one pound early in the tour but before long it was cut to ten shillings. Things eventually became so bad that the team would travel on overnight trains to save on accommodation. The players had sailed from Sydney on one-way fares and the Northern Union had to pay the players' fares home. Later, evidence emerged that Giltinan lost £418 on the campaign and was bankrupted on his return to Sydney.

=== Aftermath ===
Peter Moir a seminal figure in the foundation of the Glebe club had an unhappy tour and played in only four games and no Tests. At tour's end he wrote a letter home, The team is run by a clique and you are picked by them. I am very disappointed at not getting a game. It is very hard as all my people live here and they keep asking me why I am not playing and I cannot tell them a lie.

Deane, Walsh, Frawley, Devereux, McCabe and Rosenfeld all stayed behind to play in the wintry Northern Union competition when the Australians boarded the RMS Seuvic for the journey home. On the return journey Messenger met and fell in love with Annie Macauley whom he would marry. Also while en route back to Australia, secretary J. J. Giltinan, president Henry Hoyle and treasurer, Victor Trumper, the men who had done most to form the NSWRL, were being voted out of it.

== Touring party ==
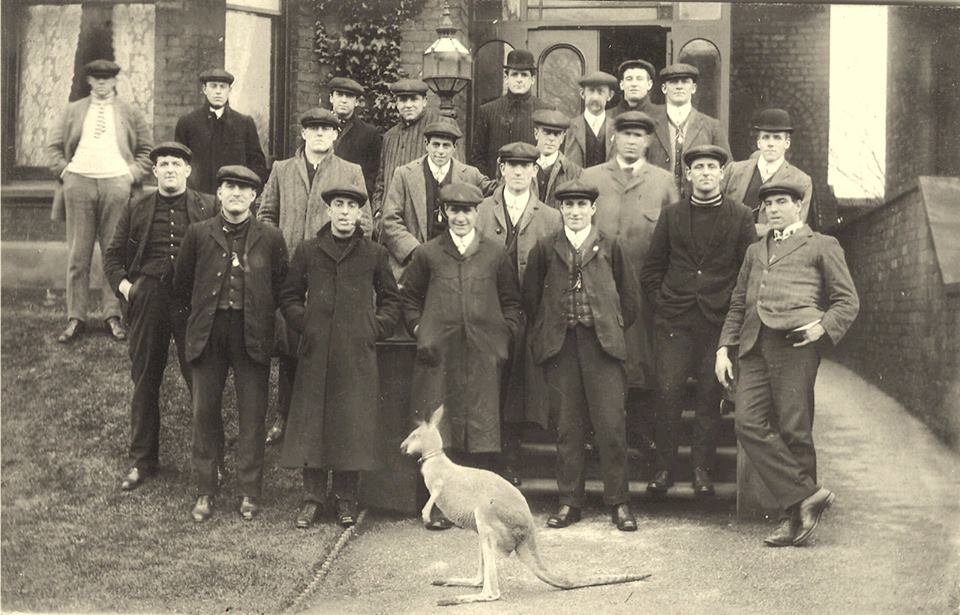
A group of the 1908 Kangaroos

=== Tour management ===
Tour manager: James Giltinan
Giltinan had borrowed £2,000 to fund the entire tour as promoter. He was one of the founders of the breakaway code's Australian formation in Sydney a year earlier.
Assistant manager: John Fihelly
Fihelly was one of the code's founders in Queensland. He had represented for Queensland in rugby union and in the state's first representative league side in May 1908. He was a state selector that year. He did not play any matches on tour & performed the role of Assistant Manager. He would later referee many matches of the 1909 Brisbane club competition & a 1910 Test match.
Tour secretary: Bill Noble
Selected as a player, Noble the 1908 Newtown club captain was injured early and made only three tour match appearances. He performed the role of Secretary/Treasurer, managing the tour's scarce finances.
Tour captain: Denis Lutge A rugged North Sydney forward North who worked as a stevedore, Lutge was elected Tour Captain by his team-mates shortly after the squad set sail from Sydney. He had captained Australia in the 3rd ever Test match against New Zealand in June 1908. Lutge broke his arm early in the tour and appeared in only five tour matches and no Tests.
Test captains: Dally Messenger & Alex Burdon Lutge's deputy as tour vice-captain, Messenger stepped up to lead Australia in the first two Tests, scoring all of Australian's points in the 2nd. A knee injury from attempting field goals kept him out of the 3rd Test. Burdon was one of the founders of the Glebe club and its first captain. He was a selector on the 1908 tour and selected himself in two Tests and 24 tour matches. He led Australia in the 3rd Test.

=== Touring squad ===
Name	Tests	Club	Tour Apps	Position	Pts
Dally Messenger	2	Eastern Suburbs	31	Three-quarter back	155
Jim Devereaux	2	North Sydney	31	Three-quarter back	54
Dan Frawley	2	Eastern Suburbs	24	Three-quarter back	41
Andy Morton	1	North Sydney	24	Three-quarter back	32
Ed "Tedda" Courtney	3	Newtown	31	Forward	30
Albert Conlon	1	Glebe	8	Half-back	27
Pat "Nimmo" Walsh	3	Newcastle Rebels	28	Forward	24
Arthur Butler	2	South Sydney	20	Half-back	22
Sid Deane	2	North Sydney	26	Three-quarter back	21
Albert Rosenfeld	1	Eastern Suburbs	14	Three-quarter back	21
Tom McCabe	1	Glebe	22	Forward	18
Arthur "Pony" Halloway	1	Glebe	31	Half-back	15
Larry O'Malley	3	Eastern Suburbs	34	Forward	15
Jim Abercrombie	2	Western Suburbs	32	Forward	12
Bill Heidke	2	Souths Brisbane (Qld)	26	Three-quarter back	12
Lou Jones	0	Eastern Suburbs	5	Forward	6
Bill "Jerry" Bailey	0	Newcastle Rebels	3	Three-quarter back	9
Mick Bolewski	3	Queensland	33	Three-quarter back	9
Alec Burdon	2	Glebe	26	Forward	9
Billy Cann	0	South Sydney	9	Forward	6
Robert Graves	1	Balmain	23	Forward	6
Peter Moir	0	Glebe	4	Forward	6
Arthur Anlezark	1	Queensland	17	Half-back	3
Sandy Pearce	3	Eastern Suburbs	33	Forward	3
Bill Hardcastle	0	Ipswich	6	Forward	3
Charlie Hedley	1	Glebe	18	Forward	2
Tommy Anderson	0	South Sydney	5	Forward	0
Frank Cheadle	0	Newtown	7	Three-quarter back	0
Jim Davis	0	South Sydney	6	Forward	0
Alf Dobbs	0	Balmain	6	Forward	0
Arthur Hennessy	0	South Sydney	7	Forward	0
Denis Lutge (c)	0	North Sydney	5	Forward	0
Bill Noble	0	Newtown	3	Forward	0
John Rosewell	0	South Sydney	1	Forward	0

== Test matches ==
=== First Test ===
12 December 1908

Northern Union (United Kingdom)	22 – 22	Australia
Tries: William Batten (2); Johnny Thomas; Ernie Brooks; George Tyson; Asa Robinson; Goals: Ernie Brooks (2)		Tries: Jim Devereux (3); Arthur Butler Goals: Dally Messenger (5)

Park Royal Ground, London
Attendance: 2,000
Referee: J Smith

Northern Union	Position	Australia
Harry Gifford	FB	Mick Bolewski
William Batten	WG	Bill Heidke
Bert Jenkins (c)	CE	Sid Deane
George Dickenson	CE	Dally Messenger (c)
George Tyson	WG	Jim Devereaux
Ernie Brooks	SO	Arthur Halloway
Johnny Thomas	SH	Arthur Butler
Arthur Mann	PR	Larry O'Malley
John Higson	HK	Sandy Pearce
William Jukes	PR	Alex Burdon
William Longworth	SR	Jim Abercrombie
Arthur Smith	SR	Tedda Courtney
Asa Robinson	LF	Pat Walsh

Great Britain led 14-5 at half-time and stretched to 17-5 before Australia began their fightback spearheaded by Devereaux's three tries. They led 22-20 in the dying minutes before Great Britain snatched a draw with a penalty goal.

=== Second Test ===
23 January 1909

Northern Union (United Kingdom)	15 – 5	Australia
Tries: James Lomas; Johnny Thomas; George Tyson; Goals: James Lomas (2); Field Goals: James Lomas		Tries: Dally Messenger Goals: Dally Messenger (1)

St James' Park, Newcastle
Attendance: 22,000
Referee: William McCutcheon

Northern Union	Position	Australia
Harry Gifford	FB	Mick Bolewski
George Tyson	WG	Dan Frawley
James Lomas (c)	CE	Dally Messenger (c)
Bert Jenkins	CE	Albert Rosenfeld
William Batten	WG	Andy Morton
Ernie Brooks	SO	Arthur Halloway
Johnny Thomas	SH	Arthur Butler
John Higson	PR	Larry O'Malley
William Jukes	HK	Sandy Pearce
William Longworth	PR	Jim Abercrombie
Arthur Smith	SR	Tom McCabe
Asa Robinson	SR	Tedda Courtney
Dick Silcock	LF	Pat Walsh

=== Third Test ===
10 February 1909

Northern Union (United Kingdom)	6 – 5	Australia
Tries: James Lomas; George Tyson; Goals:		Tries: Dan Frawley Goals: Jim Devereaux (1)

Villa Park, Birmingham
Attendance: 9,000
Referee: E Smirk

Northern Union	Position	Australia
Frank Young	FB	Charlie Hedley
William Batten	WG	Bill Heidke
Bert Jenkins	CE	Dan Frawley
James Lomas (c)	CE	Jim Devereaux
George Tyson	WG	Mick Bolewski
Ernie Brooks	SO	Sid Deane
Johnny Thomas	SH	Arthur Anlezark
William Jukes	PR	Larry O'Malley
Dick Padbury	HK	Sandy Pearce
Arthur Smith	PR	Alex Burdon (c)
William Longworth	SR	Robert Graves
Arthur Mann	SR	Tedda Courtney
Frank Boylen	LF	Pat Walsh

A heavy pitch limited scoring opportunities and Great Britain went to the half-time break with a three nil lead. Australia's defence was solid throughout the second half and when Frawley scored for Devereaux to convert they took the lead. However, with Australian centre Bill Heidke off the field having a dislocated shoulder put back in place, Oldham winger George Tyson scored late in the match and secured The Ashes for Great Britain for the first time.

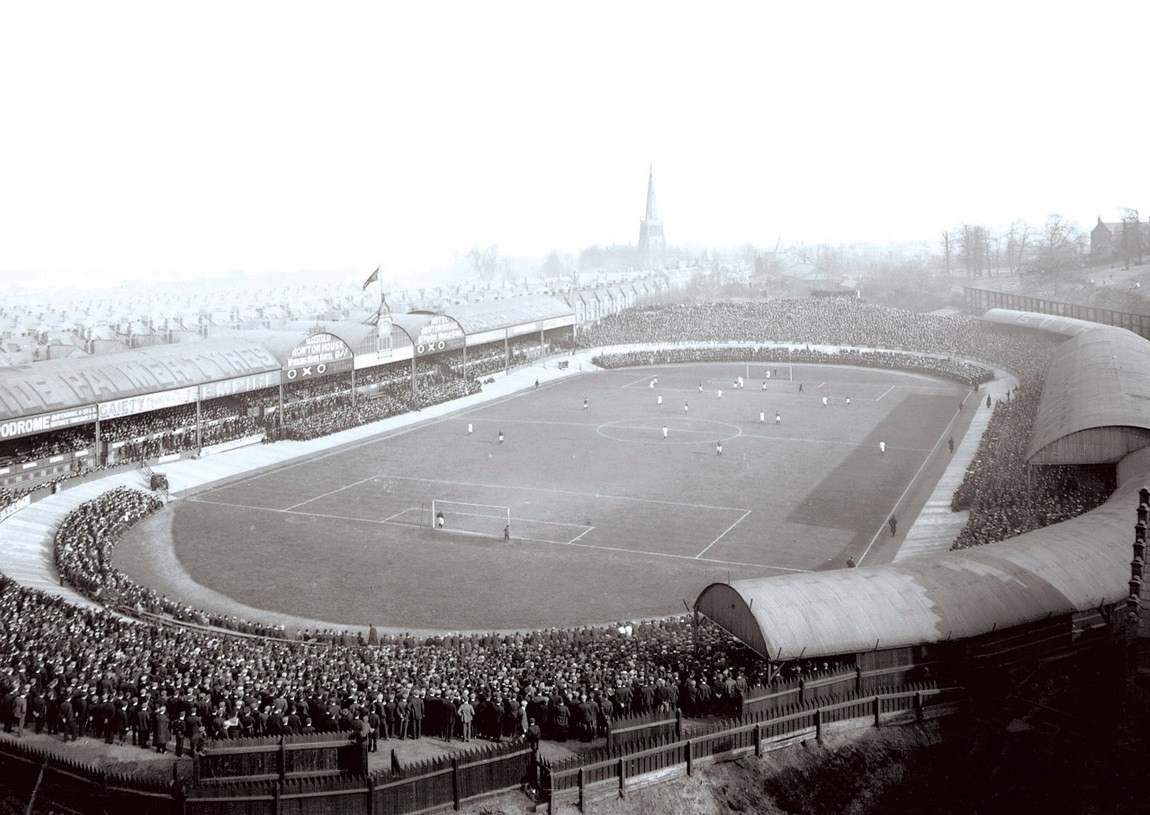
Villa Park, host venue for the third Ashes Test.

=== Sources ===
- Whiticker, Alan(2004) Captaining the Kangaroos, New Holland, Sydney
- Whiticker, Alan & Hudson, Glen (2006) The Encyclopedia of Rugby League Players, Gavin Allen Publishing, Sydney
- Andrews, Malcolm (2006) The ABC of Rugby League Austn Broadcasting Corpn, Sydney
- Heads, Ian and Middleton, David (2008) A Centenary of Rugby League, MacMillan Sydney
- 1908/09 Kangaroo Tour to Great Britain at rlhalloffame.org.uk
- 1908/09 Kangaroo Tour of Great Britain at rl1908.com
- Australia's First 'Ashes' Team at rl1908.com
- Touring With The 1908 Pioneers at rl1908.com
- Ashes Series 1908/09 at rugbyleagueproject.org
