= Peter Moir =

Australian dual-code rugby player (1882–1921)

Personal information
- Born: 1882 Bathurst, New South Wales, Australia
- Died: 10 June 1921 (aged 38–39) Malabar, New South Wales, Australia

Playing information

Rugby union
Club
Years	Team	Pld	T	G	FG	P
19??–??	Bathurst
19??–1907	Glebe
	Total	0	0	0	0	0
Representative
Years	Team	Pld	T	G	FG	P
1903	New South Wales	7

Rugby league
- Position: Forward
Club
Years	Team	Pld	T	G	FG	P
1908–09	Glebe	10	3	1	0	11
Representative
Years	Team	Pld	T	G	FG	P
1907–08	New South Wales	4	3	0	0	9
1908	Australia	0	0	0	0	0

Peter Moir (1882–1921) was an Australian rugby footballer of the early 1900s who was a key figure in the foundation of rugby league in Australia. He was one of Australia's first national representative players appearing in the inaugural professional series against New Zealand in 1907 and making the 1908–09 Kangaroo tour of Great Britain. In 1907 he played for New South Wales in the very first rugby match run by the newly created 'New South Wales Rugby Football League' which had just split away from the established New South Wales Rugby Football Union.

== Union career and dissent ==
Moir played rugby for Bathurst and Glebe, gaining selection for the New South Wales rugby union team in 1903.

At the time concerns were starting to be raised over rugby football and cricket administrations' treatment of their players, Moir was a frequent visitor to Australian international cricketer Victor Trumper's sporting goods store at Market Street, Sydney. Moir and Trumper, along with Alec Burdon, J J Giltinan and Henry Hoyle attended one such meeting in 1907 to form a new governing body for rugby football in New South Wales and organise a team to host Albert Baskiville's similarly rebellious touring New Zealand rugby team.

== Professional career ==
When the Australian leg of the 1907–1908 New Zealand rugby tour of Australia and Great Britain commenced, Moir played for the first ever New South Wales rugby league team at second-row forward against the "All Golds". Although played under rugby union rules, this match was professional (all players received £1) and was the first rugby match not sanctioned by the New South Wales Rugby Football Union and thus was essentially Australia's first rugby league match.

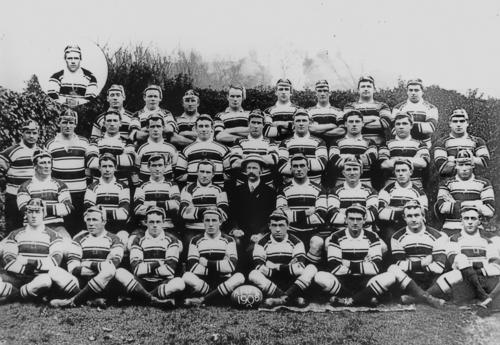
Moir (back row, 3rd from left) Pioneer Kangaroos 1908-09

The following year, the 1908 NSWRFL season, the first of the New South Wales Rugby Football League, commenced and Moir played for Glebe RLFC. He made two state representative appearances for New South Wales against Queensland that year and at season's end he was selected to tour with the inaugural Kangaroos on the 1908–09 tour. He played in only four matches of the tour none of them Test matches.

Following the Kangaroo tour he retired and took on an administrative role with the Glebe club. He was only 39 years old when he died at the Coast Hospital, Malabar on 10 June 1921 after contracting blood poisoning.

Peter Moir was awarded Life Membership of the New South Wales Rugby League in 1914.
