= Pat Walsh (rugby) =

Australia international dual-code rugby player

- Born: Patrick Bernard Walsh; 3 May 1879 Cooks Hill, New South Wales
- Died: 22 May 1953 (aged 74) Islington, New South Wales

Rugby union career
- Position: number 8
Amateur team(s)
Years	Team	Apps	(Points)
- Norwood
- Carlton
1906-08	Parnell and City (Auckland NZ)		
Provincial / State sides
Years	Team	Apps	(Points)
1899-05	Northern District		
1903-05	NSW Waratahs		
1907	Auckland		
International career
Years	Team	Apps	(Points)
1904	Australia	3	(0)
- Rugby league career

Playing information
- Position: Second-row
Club
Years	Team	Pld	T	G	FG	P
1908	Newcastle	2				0
1909–1911	Huddersfield
	Total	2	0	0	0	0
Representative
Years	Team	Pld	T	G	FG	P
1908	Queensland	1				0
1908–1909	Australia	3				0

Patrick Bernard "Nimmo" Walsh (3 May 1879 – 22 May 1953) was a pioneer Australian representative rugby union and rugby league footballer, a dual-code international, who saw active duty with the Australian Imperial Force in the first World War. He represented the Wallabies in three Tests in 1904 and the Kangaroos in three Tests on the first tour of Great Britain in 1908–09.

== Rugby union career ==
=== In Australia ===
Born in 1879 at Cook's Hill, Newcastle, New South Wales he played rugby for the Norwood and Carlton clubs usually as a backrower and at times at fly-half.

In 1899 Walsh represented Northern District (Newcastle & Hunter) against the first touring British team in a match at Newcastle. In 1903 he represented Combined Country against Metropolis (Sydney City) and Combined Country against New Zealand. He also represented New South Wales against Queensland that year.

In 1904 he again represented Northern District against the touring British team and also represented New South Wales. He scored NSW's first try against Queensland and NSW's first try against the visiting British side in Sydney. That year he made his Wallaby début as a number 8, playing in all three Tests against the touring British. In 1905 he represented NSW against Queensland. The rugby public were surprised when he missed selection for the national side to New Zealand. "Walsh's exclusion is simply a Chinese Puzzle".

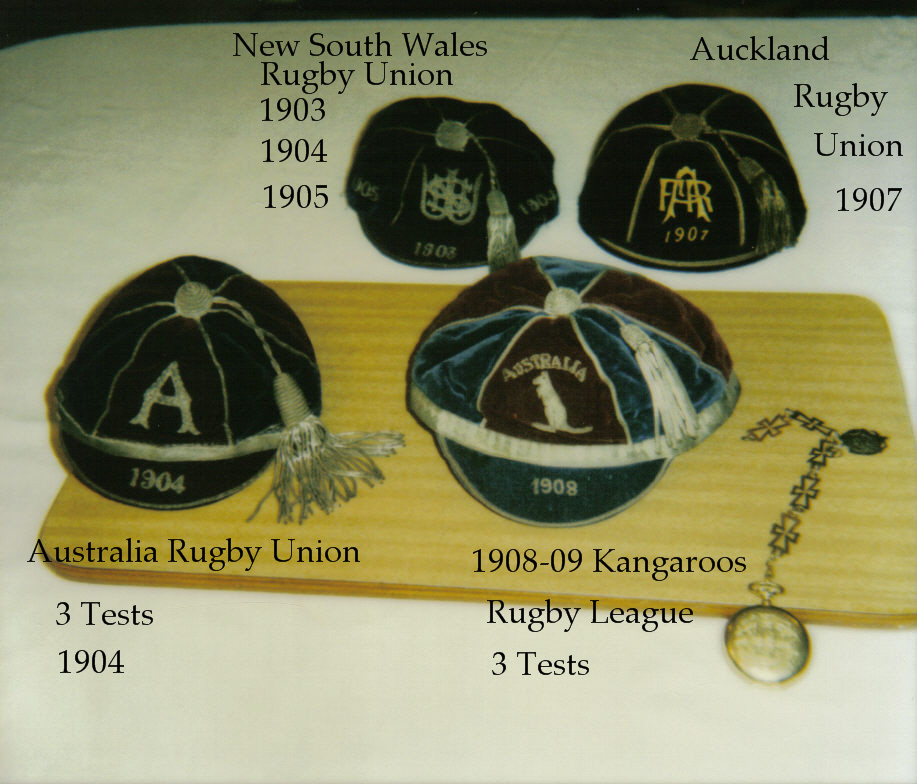
Pat Walsh's representative honour caps

=== Australian rules spell ===
Disappointed he left Australia, first going to Johannesburg, South Africa where he was Vice Captain of the Commonwealth football team, premiers in the 1905 Australian Football League Competition. That trophy is currently held at the Australian Gallery of Sport and Olympic Museum at the Melbourne Cricket Ground. In 1905 Australian Rules football was played in Australia, New Zealand and South Africa.

=== Rugby union in New Zealand ===
In 1906 he moved to Auckland, New Zealand to play rugby for Parnell in the Auckland competition which featured many 1905 All Blacks who had toured Great Britain sweeping all before them aside from a sole loss to Wales.

In 1907 Walsh was chosen in the Auckland representative team to tour Southland New Zealand. In 1908 he Played for Auckland's City club, gaining an impressive reputation. "On Saturday's play Walsh stood out as being the best player in the Senior Grade Competition. He secured three tries"; "Walsh was the star of the forward division, not even being overshadowed by H.Hayward"; "...the outstanding men in the front division being Walsh (the best forward on the ground) Seeling, Herring and J.Magee.". He looked set for All Black selection.

A cablegram from J.J.Giltinan offering the prospects of a Tour to Great Britain as a member of the pioneer Kangaroo rugby league side lured him back to Australia.

== Rugby league career ==
On return to Australia after spending the last three years in New Zealand Walsh played his first rugby league match for Queensland against New South Wales. He played for the Newcastle club in the 1908 New South Wales Rugby Football League season. He gained National selection for the inaugural 1908–09 Kangaroo tour of Great Britain.

He travelled to England in a second ship (the Salamis) and was reported to have brought the live kangaroo mascot with him. He played in all three Tests of the tour as a Front Rower. His rugby league international début in the 1st Test of 1908 in London along with Alex Burdon saw them collectively become Australia's eighth and ninth dual code rugby internationals. Pat Walsh played twenty-nine matches on the tour scoring nine tries.

After the tour he remained in England, accepting an offer from the Huddersfield club where he played from 1909 to 1911 and built a reputation as one of the finest forwards in England. J.J.Giltinan 'Considered him the Finest Forward in the Northern Union'(Huddersfield rugby News.10 April 1909)

On his return to Australia in 1911 he played for Central in the Newcastle Rugby League Competition and captained the Combined Newcastle & Hunter side which toured Queensland. This team defeated the Queensland state side in all three matches. After the tour, Pat Walsh remained in Queensland to coach for the next few years.

Dally Messenger listed him in his Favourite Team and he was listed in W.A."Billy" Cann's Best Alltime Team in 1938.

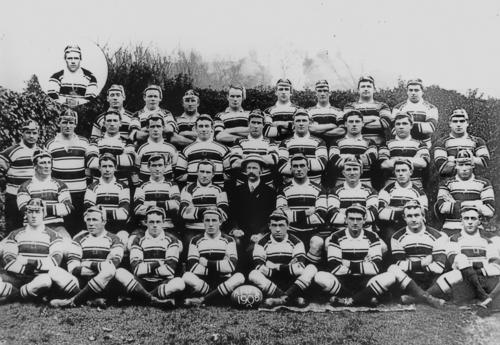
Walsh (back row, 4th from left) Pioneer Kangaroos 1908-09

== Wartime ==
Pat Walsh enlisted in the AIF during the Great War and served with the 12th Light Horse at Gallipoli and in Egypt and Palestine. His specialist skill was as a farrier, serving with the rank of corporal. He arrived at Gallipoli in the summer of 1915 having left Sydney on HMAT A29 Suevic in June 1915. He was mentioned in despatches by General Allenby for distinguished and gallant services and devotion to duty during the Palestine campaign where he served as a member of the Australian Railway Construction unit.

During World War I he contracted a paralysis to his legs and thereafter walked with the aid of crutches. He died in May 1953.
