= Anlezark =

Anlezark is a surname. Notable people with the surname include:

- Justin Anlezark (born 1977), Australian shot putter
- Arthur Anlezark (1882–1961), Australian rugby footballer

== See also ==
- Anglezarke
