= List of dual-code rugby internationals =

A dual-code rugby international is a rugby footballer who has played at the senior international level in both codes of rugby, 13-a-side rugby league and 15-a-side rugby union.

Rugby league started as a breakaway version of rugby in Northern England in 1895 and in New Zealand and Australia in 1908, and consequently a number of early top-class rugby league players had been star players in the rugby union code. Accordingly, a high proportion of Australia and New Zealand's dual-code rugby internationals played in rugby league's formative years in those countries.

From 1910 to 1995, dual-code internationals were infrequent and with the single exception of Karl Ifwersen, the player had always first appeared as a union international before shifting to league, due to strict bans applied by administrators in rugby union, which remained amateur, to those players who crossed to the professional code. In 1995 rugby union itself turned professional and the tide of switches began to reverse. Since then the vast majority of cross-code representatives have debuted internationally in league before moving to union where there is now a larger audience and more money available.

Backs have more often been successful at the highest level of both games than forwards – approximately 65% of the players here listed are backs, although pre-1995 many notable forwards moved from union to league. Since 1995 nearly 90% of the league to union converts who went on to play internationally have been backs.

The following is an incomplete list of dual-code internationals, listed by country.

== Australia ==
No.	Player	Test debut	Year	At	Cross-code debut	Date	At	Position
1	Dally Messenger	2nd RU Test v New Zealand	1907	Brisbane	RL Test All Golds v Wales	1 Jan 1908	Aberdare	Centre
2	Denis Lutge	Inaugural RU Test v New Zealand	1903	Sydney	Inaugural RL Test v New Zealand	9 May 1908	Sydney	Forward
3	Doug McLean, Snr.	2nd RU Test v British Lions	1904	Brisbane	Inaugural RL Test v New Zealand	9 May 1908	Sydney	Winger
4	Micky Dore	RU Test v New Zealand	1905	Dunedin	Inaugural RL Test v New Zealand	9 May 1908	Sydney	Half-back
5	John Rosewell	1st RU Test v New Zealand	1907	Sydney	Inaugural RL Test v New Zealand	9 May 1908	Sydney	Forward
6	Robert Graves	1st RU Test v New Zealand	1907	Sydney	Inaugural RL Test v New Zealand	9 May 1908	Sydney	Forward
7	Bill Hardcastle	4th RU Test v British Lions	1899	Sydney	2nd RL Test v New Zealand	30 May 1908	Brisbane	Forward
8	George Watson	1st RU Test V New Zealand	1907	Sydney	2nd RL Test v New Zealand	30 May 1908	Brisbane	Winger
9	Alex Burdon	Inaugural RU Test v New Zealand	1903	Sydney	1st RL Test v Great Britain	12 Dec 1908	London	Forward
10	Pat Walsh	1st RU Test v British Lions	1904	Sydney	1st RL Test v Great Britain	12 Dec 1908	London	Forward
11	Arthur Anlezark	RU Test v New Zealand	1905	Dunedin	3rd RL Test v Great Britain	10 Feb 1909	Birmingham	Half-back
12	Charles Russell	1st RU Test v New Zealand	1907	Sydney	1st RL Test v Great Britain	18 Jun 1910	Sydney	Winger
13	Chris McKivat	1st RU Test v New Zealand	1907	Sydney	1st RL Test v Great Britain	18 Jun 1910	Sydney	Half-back
14	John Barnett	1st RU Test v New Zealand	1907	Sydney	1st RL Test v Great Britain	18 Jun 1910	Sydney	Forward
15	Bob Craig	Olympic Final (RU) v Great Britain	1908	London	1st RL Test v Great Britain	18 Jun 1910	Sydney	Forward
16	Jack Hickey	Olympic Final (RU) v Great Britain	1908	London	1st RL Test v Great Britain	18 Jun 1910	Sydney	Centre
17	Patrick McCue	1st RU Test v New Zealand	1907	Sydney	1st RL Test v Great Britain	18 Nov 1911	Newcastle	Forward
18	Herb Gilbert	1st RU Test v New Zealand	1910	Sydney	1st RL Test v Great Britain	18 Nov 1911	Newcastle	Centre
19	Peter Burge	1st RU Test v New Zealand	1907	Sydney	Kangaroo tour match (RL)	1911	England	Forward
20	Charles McMurtrie	Olympic Final (RU) v Great Britain	1908	London	Kangaroo tour match (RL)	1911	England	Forward
21	Bob Stuart	2nd RU Test v New Zealand	1910	Sydney	Kangaroo tour match (RL)	1911	England	Forward
22	Claud O'Donnell	1st RU Test v New Zealand	1913	Wellington	1st RL Test v New Zealand	23 Aug 1919	Wellington	Hooker
23	Clarrie Prentice	1st RU Test v New Zealand	1914	Sydney	1st RL Test v New Zealand	23 Aug 1919	Wellington	Hooker
24	Doug McLean Jr.	1st RU Test v South Africa	1933	Cape Town	1st RL Test v New Zealand	7 Aug 1937	Auckland	Winger
25	Trevor Allan	RU Test Aust v New Zealand	1949	Wellington	RL Other Nationalities v Wales	31 Mar 1950	Wales	Back
26	Ken Kearney	1st RU Test v New Zealand	1947	Brisbane	3rd RL Test v Great Britain	13 Dec 1952	Bradford	Hooker
27	Rex Mossop	1st RU Test v New Zealand	1949	Wellington	1st RL Test v Great Britain	14 Jun 1958	Sydney	Forward
28	Arthur Summons	1st RU Test v Wales	1958	Cardiff	1st RL Test v New Zealand	1 Jul 1961	Auckland	Half-back
29	Michael Cleary	RU Test v France	1961	Sydney	1st RL Test v Great Britain	9 Jun 1962	Sydney	Winger
30	Jim Lisle	1st RU Test v Fiji	1961	Brisbane	3rd RL Test v Great Britain	14 Jul 1962	Sydney	Five-eighth
31	Dick Thornett	RU Test v France	1961	Sydney	1st RL Test v South Africa	20 Jul 1963	Brisbane	Forward
32	Kevin Ryan	RU Test v England	1958	London	2nd RL Test v France	4 Jul 1964	Brisbane	Forward
33	Bob Honan	1st RU Test v New Zealand	1964	Dunedin	1st RL Test v New Zealand	1 Jun 1969	Auckland	Back
34	Phil Hawthorne	3rd RU Test v New Zealand	1962	Wellington	1st RL Test v Great Britain	6 Jun 1970	Brisbane	Five-eighth
35	John Brass	2nd RU Test v British Lions	1966	Brisbane	1st RL Test v Great Britain	6 Jun 1970	Brisbane	Centre
36	Stephen Knight	2nd RU Test v South Africa	1969	Kimberley, SA	RLWC v Great Britain	29 Oct 1972	Perpignan	Winger
37	Geoff Richardson	1st RU Test v South Africa	1971	Sydney	1st RL Test v Great Britain	15 Jun 1974	Brisbane	Five-eighth
38	Ray Price	1st RU Test v New Zealand	1974	Sydney	1st RL Test v New Zealand	24 Jun 1978	Sydney	Forward
39	Michael O'Connor	1st RU Test v Argentina	1979	Buenos Aires	1st RL Test v New Zealand	6 Jul 1986	Auckland	Centre
40	Ricky Stuart	Wallaby Argentina Tour (RU)	1987	Argentina	1st RL Test v Great Britain	27 Oct 1990	London	Half-back
41	Scott Gourley	RU Test v Scotland	1988	Edinburgh	1st RL Test v PNG	6 Oct 1991	Goroka	Forward
42	Andrew Walker	RL Test v PNG Team	1996	Port Moresby	1st RU Test v New Zealand	25 Jul 2000	Sydney	Back
43	Wendell Sailor	1st RL Test v Great Britain	1994	London	1st RU Test v France	22 Jun 2002	Melbourne	Winger
44	Mat Rogers	1st RL Test v New Zealand	1998	Auckland	1st RU Test v France	22 Jun 2002	Melbourne	Back
45	Lote Tuqiri	1st RL Test v New Zealand	2001	Wellington	1st RU Test v Ireland	7 Jun 2003	Perth	Winger
46	Timana Tahu	RL Test v Great Britain	2002	Sydney	1st RU Test v New Zealand	26 Jun 2008	Sydney	Centre
47	Israel Folau	RL Test v New Zealand	2007	Wellington	1st RU Test v British and Irish Lions	22 Jun 2013	Brisbane	Winger
48	Karmichael Hunt	RL Test v New Zealand	2006	Brisbane	1st RU Test v Fiji	10 Jun 2017	Melbourne	Centre
49	Mark Nawaqanitawase	1st RU Test v Italy	13 Nov 2022	Florence	1st RL Test v England	25 Oct 2025	London	Winger

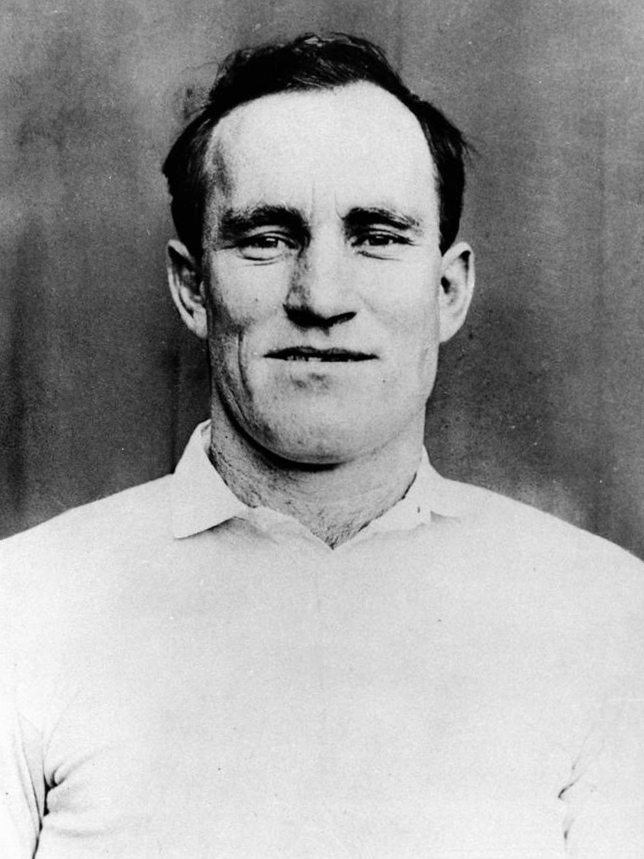
Dally Messenger

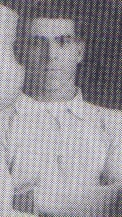
Bob Graves

Pat Walsh

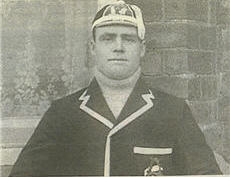
Boxer Russell

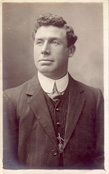
Chris McKivat

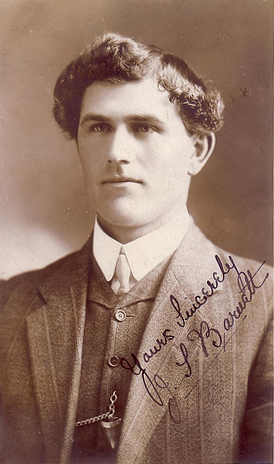
Jumbo Barnett

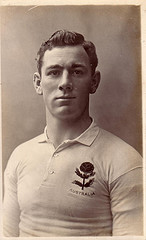
Bob Craig

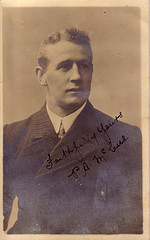
Patrick McCue

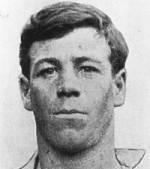
Herb Gilbert

Peter Burge

Watson (back mid), Dore (front 2nd from left)

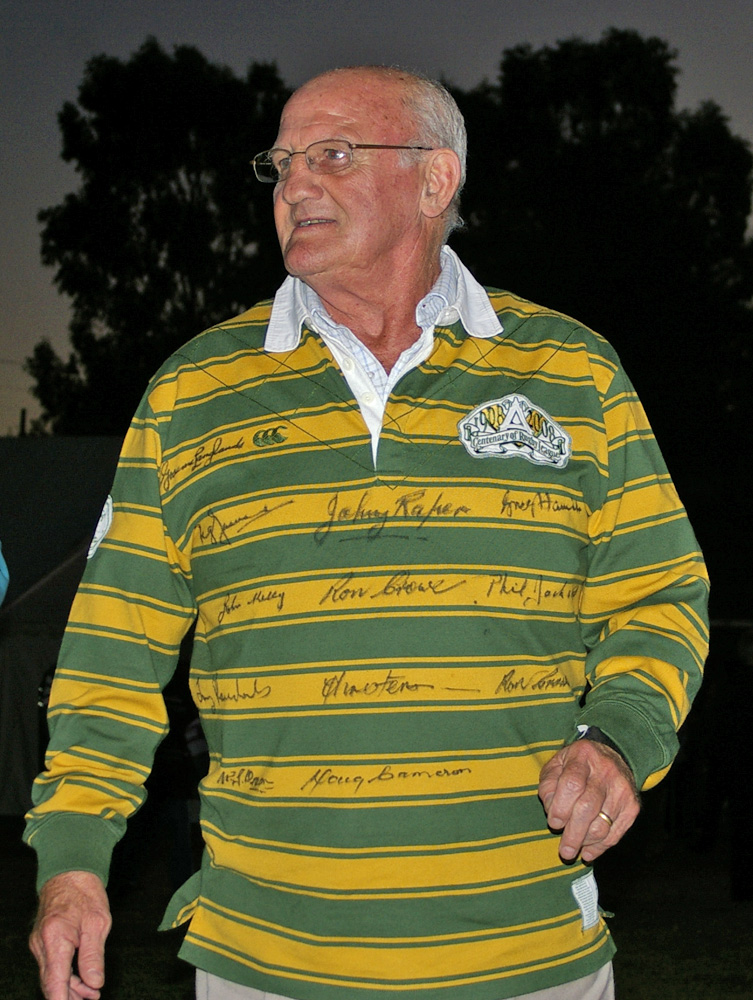
Arthur Summons

== England ==
No.	Player	Int'l Debut	Year	At	Cross Code Debut	Date	At	Position
1	Anthony Starks	RU Test v Wales	1896	Blackheath	RL Test v Other Nationalities	5 Apr 1904	Wigan	Forward/Prop
2	George Marsden	RU Test v Wales	1900	Gloucester	RL Test v Other Nationalities	2 Jan 1905	Bradford	Five-eighth
3	Alf Wood	RU Test v France	1908	Colombes	2nd Ashes Test v Australia	16 Dec 1911	Edinburgh	Forward/Prop
4	Thomas "Tommy" Woods	RU Test v Scotland	1908	Inverleith	2nd Ashes Test v Australia	16 Dec 1911	Edinburgh	Forward
5	Frank Boylen	RU Test v France	1908	Stade Colombes	2nd RL Test Northern Union v Australia	10 Feb 1909	Villa Park	Prop
6	Dave Holland	RU Test v Wales	1912	Twickenham	1st RL Test GB v Australia	27 Jun 1914	Sydney	Forward
7	Jim Brough	RU Test v New Zealand	1925	Twickenham	RL Test v Wales	12 Apr 1926	Pontypridd	Fullback
8	Thomas Holliday	RU Test v Scotland	1923	Inverleith	RL Test v Wales	11 Jan 1928	Wigan	Fullback
9	Thompson "Tom" Danby	RU Test v Wales	1949	Cardiff	RL Test v Wales	1 Mar 1950	Wigan	Wing
10	Ray French	RU Test v Wales	1961	Cardiff	RL Test GB v France	11 Feb 1968	Paris	Forward
11	Bev Risman	1st RU Test v Wales	1959	Cardiff	RLWC GB v Australia	25 May 1968	Sydney	Half
12	Keith Fielding	1st RU Test v Ireland	1969	Lansdowne Road	RLWC v France	19 Jan 1975	Perpignan	Wing
13	Mike Coulman	1st RU Test v Australia	1967	Twickenham	RLWC v Wales	10 Jun 1975	Brisbane	Prop
14	Keith Smith	RU Test v France	1974	Paris	RL Test v Wales	16 Mar 1979	Widnes	Centre
15	Peter Williams	1st RU Test v Scotland	1987	London	1st RL Test v France	21 Jan 1989	Central Park	Fly-half/Centre
16	John Bentley	1st RU Test v Ireland	1988	Dublin	1st RL Test v France	8 Feb 1992	Perpignan	Wing
17	Barrie-Jon Mather	RL Test v France	1994	Carcasonne	RU Test v Wales	11 Apr 1999	London	Back
18	Jason Robinson	1st RL Test v New Zealand	1993	London	RU Test v Italy	17 Feb 2001	London	Back
19	Andy Farrell	3rd RL Test v New Zealand	1993	Leeds	RU Test v Scotland	3 Feb 2007	London	Forward
20	Chris Ashton	RL Test v France	2006	Leeds	RU Test v France	20 Mar 2010	Paris	Wing
21	Kyle Eastmond	RL Test v Wales	2009	Bridgend	RU Test v Argentina	8 Jun 2013	Salta	
22	Joel Tomkins	RL Test v France	2010	Leigh	RU Test v Australia	2 Nov 2013	Twickenham	Centre
23	Sam Burgess	1st RL Test v New Zealand	2007	Huddersfield	RU Test v France	15 August 2015	Twickenham	Centre

== Fiji ==
No.	Player	Int'l Debut	Year	At	Cross Code Debut	Date	At	Position
1	Kaiava Salusalu	RU Test v Tonga	1982	Suva	RL Test v Australia	12 Jul 1996	Newcastle	Centre
2	Kaleveti Naisoro	RU Test	1991		RL Test	1994		
3	Fili Seru	RU Test v Tonga	1990	Nuku A'lofa	RL Test v France	9 Jul 1995	Suva	Centre
4	Noa Nadruku	RU Test v England	1988	Suva	RL Test v France	9 Jul 1994	Suva	Back
5	Jioji Vatubua	RU Test v Tonga	1992	Nuka A'lofa	RLWC v South Africa	8 Oct 1995	Lawkholme Lane, UK	Bench
6	Niumaia Korovata	RU Test v Hong Kong	1990	Hong Kong	RLWC v England	11 Oct 1995	Central Park, UK	Bench
7	Kiniviliame Koroibuleka	RU game v Auckland	1992		RLWC v Australia	14 Oct 1995	Alfred McAlpine Stadium, UK	Bench
8	Waisale Vatubua	RU Test v Tonga	1988	Nuka A'lofa	RLWC v Australia	14 Oct 1995	Alfred McAlpine Stadium, UK	Bench
9	Mesake Navugona	RU Test vs Samoa	1992	Suva	RLWC v Australia	1 Nov 2000	Gateshead International Stadium	Bench
10	Alipate Noilea	RL Test vs Samoa	2006		PNC v Tonga	13 Jun 2009		Outside back
11	Waisale Sukanaveita	RL Test vs France	2008	Canberra Stadium	PNC v Samoa	27 Jun 2009	Churchill Park	Outside Center
12	Semi Radradra	RLWC vs Samoa	17 Nov 2013	Halliwell Jones Stadium	PNC v Georgia	9 Jun 2018	ANZ National Stadium	Outside Center

== France ==
No.	Player	Int'l Debut	Year	At	Cross Code Debut	Date	At	Position
1	Jean Galia	RU Test v England	1927	Paris	1st RL Test v England	15 Apr 1934	Paris	Forward
2	Max Rousié	RU Test v Scotland	1931	Edinburgh	1st RL Test v Australia	2 Jan 1938	Paris	Back
3	Jean Dauger	Inaugural RL Test v Australia	1938	Paris	1st RU Test v British Army	1 Jan 1945	Paris	Centre
4	Jean Duhau							
5	Jean Barthe							
6	Jacques Merquey							
7	Claude Mantoulan	v Ireland	1959	Lansdowne Road				
8	Henri Marracq	RU Test v Romania	1961	Bayonne	1st RL Test v Australia	8 Dec 1963	Bordeaux	Second-row
9	Jean Capdouze	RU Test v South Africa	1964	Springs	2nd RL Test v Australia	17 Dec 1967	Carcassonne	Five-eighth
10	Fabrice Estebanez	RL Test v	2005		1st RU Test v Fiji	13 Nov 2010	Nantes	Centre

== Hong Kong ==
Qualifying on residency, New Zealand-born Jack Nielsen became Hong Kong's first dual-code international when the Hong Kong rugby league team played their first ever international match in November 2017.

No.	Player	Int'l Debut	Year	At	Cross Code Debut	Date	At	Position
1	Jack Nielsen	RU Test v ?	?	?	RL Test v Japan	4 Nov 2017	Kowloon	Prop

== Ireland ==
No.	Player	Int'l Debut	Year	At	Cross Code Debut	Date	At	Position
1	Brian Carney	RLWC v Samoa	2000	Belfast	RU Test v Scotland	11 Aug 2007	Edinburgh	Back

== Italy ==
No.	Player	Int'l Debut	Year	At	Cross Code Debut	Date	At	Position
1	Vincenzo Bertolotto	RU International v Germany	1936	Berlin	RL Tour Match v Wigan	26 Aug 1950	Wigan	Left-Second-row
2	Giovanni Bonino	RU International v France XV	1949	Stade Vélodrome, Marseille	RL Tour Match v Wigan	26 Aug 1950	Wigan	Loose forward/Lock
3	Angelo Arrigoni	RU International v Czechoslovakia	1949	Strahov Stadium, Prague	RL Tour Match v Wigan	26 Aug 1950	Wigan	Centre
4	Gert Peens	RU Test v Wales	2002	Cardiff	RL Test vs Serbia	9 Jun 2012	Belgrade	Wing
5	Mirco Bergamasco	RU Test v France	2002	Saint-Denis	RLWCQ v Serbia	22 Oct 2016	Belgrade	Centre

== Germany ==
No.	Player	Int'l Debut	Year	At	Cross Code Debut	Date	At	Position
1	James Keinhorst	RU Test v ?	?	?	RL Test v ?	?	?	Fullback
2	Michael Kerr	RU Test v ?	?	?	RL Test v ?	?	?	Flanker

== Malta ==
No.	Player	Int'l Debut	Year	At	Cross Code Debut	Date	At	Position
1	Jarrod Sammut	RL Test v Lebanon	2006	Sydney	RU Test v Croatia	8 Oct 2008	Marsa	Back
2	Matt Jarrett	RU Test	≤2009	?	RL Test vs Lebanon	6 May 2017	Sydney	

== New Zealand ==
There have been 36 New Zealand dual-code internationals. Only four people became dual-code internationals after first representing New Zealand in rugby league: Karl Ifwersen, Sonny Bill Williams, Matt Duffie and Roger Tuivasa-Sheck.

No.	Player	Test debut	Year	At	Cross-code debut	Date	At	Position
1	Thomas Cross	RU Test v British Lions	1904	Wellington	RL Test All Golds v Wales	1 Jan 1908	Aberdare	Forward
2	Edgar Wrigley	RU Test v Australia	1905	Dunedin	RL Test All Golds v Wales	1 Jan 1908	Aberdare	Five-eighth
3	Herbert Turtill	RU Test v Australia	1905	Dunedin	RL Test All Golds v Wales	1 Jan 1908	Aberdare	Fullback
4	Massa Johnston	RU Test Originals tour match	1905	Britain	RL Test All Golds v Wales	1 Jan 1908	Aberdare	Forward
5	William Mackrell	RU Test v France	1906	Paris	RL Test All Golds v Wales	1 Jan 1908	Aberdare	Forward
6	George Smith	RU Test v Scotland	1905	Inverleith	RL Test All Golds v Northern Union	25 Jan 1908	Headingley	Centre
7	Duncan McGregor	RU Test v Australia	1903	Sydney	RL All Golds tour	1908	Britain & Aust	Wing
8	Eric Watkins	RU Test v Australia	1905	Dunedin	RL All Golds tour	1908	Britain & Aust	Forward
9	John Spencer	RU Test v Australia	1905	Dunedin	RL 1st Test v Australia	12 Jun 1909	Sydney	Forward
11	Albert Asher	RU Test v Australia	1903	Sydney	RL Int'l Australasia v GB	9 Jul 1910	Sydney	Winger
12	Ned Hughes	RU Test v Australia	1907	Sydney	RL Test v Great Britain	30 Jul 1910	Auckland	Hooker
13	George A. Gillett	RU Test v Scotland	1905	Edinburgh	RL Kiwis tour match	1911	Australia	Fullback
14	Billy Mitchell	RU Test v Australia	1910	Sydney	RL Kiwis tour match	1911	Australia	Wing
15	Arthur Francis	RU Test v Australia	1905	Dunedin	RL Kiwis tour match	1911	Australia	Forward
16	Harold Hayward	RU Test v British Lions	1908	Auckland	RL Kiwis tour match	1912	Australia	Flanker
17	Dave Evans	RU Test v Australia	1910	Sydney	RL Kiwis tour match	1912	Australia	Flanker
18	Dougie McGregor	RU Test v Australia	1913	Wellington	RL 3rd Test v Australia	6 Sep 1919	Auckland	Winger
19	Karl Ifwersen	RL Test v Australia	1913	Auckland	RU Test v South Africa	17 Sep 1921	Wellington	2nd 5/8
20	Jim O'Brien	RU international v New South Wales	1922	Sydney	RL 1st Test v Great Britain	2 Aug 1924	Wellington	Forward
21	Charles Fitzgerald	RU international v New South Wales	1922	Sydney	RL 1st Test v Great Britain	2 Aug 1924	Wellington	Centre
22	Lou Petersen	RU international v New South Wales	1921	Christchurch	RL 2nd Test v Great Britain	6 Aug 1924	Wellington	Forward
23	Alphonsus Carroll	RU international v New South Wales	1920	Sydney	RL 1st Test v Great Britain	2 Oct 1926	Wigan	Hooker
24	Bert Cooke	RU international v New South Wales	1924	Sydney	RL 1st Test v Great Britain	30 Jul 1932	Auckland	Centre
25	Herb Lilburne	RU Test v South Africa	1928	Port Elizabeth	RL 2nd Test v Australia	2 Oct 1935	Auckland	Winger
26	George Nēpia	RU Test v Ireland	1924	Edinburgh	RL 2nd Test v Australia	14 Aug 1937	Auckland	Fullback
27	Hawea Mataira	RU Test v Australia	1934	Sydney	RL Kiwi tour match	1939	Britain	Forward
28	Jimmy Haig	RU Test v Australia	1946	Dunedin	RL Test v England	20 Dec 1947	Bradford	Halfback
29	Kurt Sherlock	RU New Zealand tour match	1985	Argentina	RL 3rd Test v Australia	23 Jul 1989	Auckland	Back
30	Frano Botica	RU Test v France	1986	Christchurch	RL 1st Test v Australia	3 Jul 1991	Melbourne	Fullback
31	John Timu	RU 1st Test v Argentina	1991	Buenos Aires	RL 1st Test v Australia	7 Jul 1995	Sydney	Centre
32	Marc Ellis	RU Test v Scotland	1993	Edinburgh	RL 1st Test v Great Britain	9 May 1996	Auckland	Back
33	Craig Innes	RU Test v Wales	1989	Cardiff	RL Rest of the World v Australia	11 Jul 1997	Brisbane	Back
34	Sonny Bill Williams	RL Anzac Test v Australia	2004	Newcastle	RU Test v England	6 Nov 2010	Twickenham	Centre
35	Matt Duffie	RL Anzac Test v Australia	2011	Gold Coast	RU Game v Barbarians FC	30 Nov 2019	Cardiff	Back
36	Roger Tuivasa-Sheck	RLWC v Samoa	2013	Warrington	RU Test v Ireland	16 July 2022	Wellington	Back

=== All Golds ===
The 1907 Professional All Blacks (derisively referred to by the New Zealand press as the All Golds) left New Zealand in August 1907 for their ground-breaking tour of Britain via Sydney. The squad contained eight former All Blacks in George Smith, Thomas Cross, William Mackrell, Herbert Turtill, Duncan McGregor, Eric Watkins, Massa Johnston and Edgar Wrigley. These men became New Zealand's first dual-code internationals at the point they first played on the ten-month tour.

The three matches in Sydney between 17 and 24 August against professional New South Wales rugby rebels were played under rugby union rules so do not qualify as international rugby league appearances. But full internationals under "Northern Union" (rugby league) rules were played against Wales in Aberdare on 1 Januard 1908 and three Tests against Great Britain in Leeds on 25 January 1907, Chelsea on 8 February 1907 and Cheltenham on 15 February 1908. Three Test matches were played in Australia on the homeward leg before the All Golds arrived home in June 1908 having played 48 games (tour matches and Tests) as internationals.

Duncan McGregor

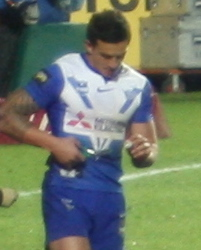
Sonny Bill Williams

== Poland ==
No.	Player	Int'l Debut	Year	At	Cross Code Debut	Date	At	Position
1	Tomasz Pozniak	RU v The Netherlands	29 Feb 2020	Amsterdam	RL v Norway	12 Nov 2022	London	Wing

== Samoa ==
No.	Player	Int'l Debut	Year	At	Cross Code Debut	Date	At	Position
1	Earl Va'a	RWC v Japan	1996	Wrexham	RL Pacific Cup v Fiji	Nov 1994	Suva	Half-back
2	Apollo Perelini	RWC v Wales	1991	Cardiff	RLWC v France	12 Oct 1995	Cardiff	Forward

== Scotland ==
No.	Player	Int'l Debut	Year	At	Cross Code Debut	Date	At	Position
1	Alex Laidlaw	RU Test v Ireland	1897	Edinburgh	RL Test Other Nationalities v England	1905 or 1906	Bradford or Wigan	Forward
2	Roy Kinnear	British Lions v South Africa	1924	Durban	RL 1st Test Great Britain v Australia	5 Oct 1929	Hull	Centre
3	Dave Valentine	RU Five Nations v Ireland	1947	Edinburgh	RL 1st Test Great Britain v Australia	9 Oct 1948	Leeds	Forward
4	David Rose	RU Test v France	1951	Colombes	RLWC Great Britain v Australia	13 Nov 1954	Paris	Three-quarter
5	Alan Tait	RWC v France	1987	Christchurch	RLWC Final Great Britain v Australia	24 Oct 1992	London	Back
6	Andy Craig	RL Test v Wales	1999	Glasgow	RU Test v Canada	15 Jun 2002	Vancouver	Centre

== South Africa ==
No.	Player	Int'l Debut	Year	At	Cross Code Debut	Date	At	Position
1	Alan Skene	RU Test v France	1958	Ellis Park Stadium	RL Test v Australia	20 Jul 1963	Lang Park	Centre, Centre
2	Colin Greenwood	RU Test v Ireland	1961	Newlands Stadium	RL Test v Australia	20 Jul 1963	Lang Park	Centre, Stand-off/Five-eighth
3	Gary Botha	RL Test v British Amateur Rugby League Association	1999		RU Test v Australia	2005	Loftus Versfeld	

== Tonga ==
No.	Player	Int'l Debut	Year	At	Cross Code Debut	Date	At	Position
1	Asa Amone	Rugby World Cup	1987	Ballymore, Brisbane	RLWC	1995	Wilderspool Stadium, Warrington	Fly-half
2	Tevita Vaikona	RLWC v New Zealand	1995	Warrington	RU PNC v Japan	4 Jun 2006	Fukuoka	Wing
3	Salesi Finau	RLWC	1995	Warrington		1998	Tonga	Wing
4	Eddie Paea	RLWC vs Samoa	2008	Sydney	RU Test vs United States	8 Jun 2011	Surrey	Hooker
5	Taniela Moa				2011 RLWC	2011		Halfback

== United States ==
No.	Player	Test debut	Year	At	Cross-code debut	Date	At	Position
1	David Niu	RL Test v ?	?		RU Test v ?	?		
2	Leonard Peters	RU Test v ?	?	RL Test v ?	?			
3	Luke Hume	RL Test v ?	?		RU Test v Canada	9 Jun 2012	Kingston	

== Wales ==
With 99, Wales have more than twice the number of dual-code rugby internationals than any other country.

No.	Player	Int'l Debut	Year	At	Cross Code Debut	Date	At	Position
1	Jack Rhapps	RU Test v England	1897	Newport	RL Test Other Nationalities v England	5 Apr 1904	Wigan	Forward
2	David Jones	RU Test v England	1902	London	RL Test v New Zealand All Golds	1 Jan 1908	Aberdare	Forward
3	Billy O'Neill	RU Test v Scotland	1904	Swansea	RL Test v England	28 Dec 1908	Broughton	Forward
4	William Dowell	RU Test v England	1907	Swansea	RL Test v England	28 Dec 1908	Broughton	Forward
5	Jake Blackmore	RU Test v England	1909	Cardiff	RL Test v England	10 Dec 1910	Coventry	Forward
6	Ben Gronow	RU Test v France	1910	Swansea	RL Test v England	10 Dec 1910	Coventry	Forward
7	Ernie Jenkins	RU Test v England	1910	Cardiff	RL Test v England	10 Dec 1910	Coventry	Forward
8	Joseph Pugsley	RU Test v Scotland	1910	London	RL Test v Australia	7 Oct 1911	Ebbw Vale	Forward
9	William Evans	RU Test v Ireland	1911	Cardiff	RL Test v England	20 Jan 1912	Oldham	Forward
10	Percy Coldrick	RU Test v England	1911	Swansea	RL Test v England	15 Feb 1913	Plymouth	Forward
11	Gus Merry	RU Test v Ireland	1912	Belfast	RL Test v England	15 Feb 1913	Plymouth	Forward
12	William Davies	RU Test v Scotland	1912	Swansea	RL Test v England	14 Apr 1914	Swansea	Back
13	Rees Richards	RU Test v Scotland	1913	Inverleith	RL Test v England	14 Apr 1914	Swansea	Forward
14	Bobby Lloyd	RU Test v Scotland	1913	Inverleith	RL Test Great Britain v Australia	3 Jul 1920	Sydney	Half-back
15	Brinley Williams	RU Test v Scotland	1920	Inverleith	RL Test v England	19 Jan 1921	Leeds	Back
16	Ike Fowler	RU Test v New Zealand Army XV	1919	Swansea	RL Test Other Nationalities v England	5 Feb 1921	Workington	Back
17	Wick Powell	RU Test v England	1920	Swansea	RL Test Other Nationalities v England	5 Feb 1921	Workington	Back
18	Edgar Morgan	RU Test v Ireland	1920	Cardiff	RL Test Great Britain v Australia	1 Oct 1921	Leeds	Forward
19	George Oliver	RU Test v England	1920	Swansea	RL Test v Australia	10 Dec 1921	Pontypridd	Forward
20	Frank Evans	RU Test v Scotland	1921	Swansea	RL Test v Australia	10 Dec 1921	Pontypridd	Back
21	Jerry Shea	RU Test v New Zealand Army XV	1919	Swansea	RL Test v England	11 Dec 1922	London	Back
22	Wilfred Hodder	RU Test v England	1921	London	RL Test Wales v England	11 Dec 1922	London	Forward
23	Dai Edwards	RU Test v England	1921	London	RL Test v England	7 Feb 1923	Wigan	Forward
24	Joe Thompson	RU Test v England	1923	London	RL Test v England	1 Oct 1923	Huddersfield	Forward
25	Johnny Ring	RU Test v England	1921	London	RL Test Great Britain v Australia	23 Jun 1924	Sydney	Back
26	Ambrose Baker	RU Test v Ireland	1921	Belfast	RL Test v England	7 Feb 1925	Workington	Forward
27	Mel Rosser	RU Test v Scotland	1924	Inverleith	RL Test v England	12 Apr 1926	Pontypridd	Back
28	Joseph Jones	RU Test v France	1924	Paris	RL Test v England	12 Apr 1926	Pontypridd	Back
29	Bryn Phillips	RU Test v England	1925	London	RL Test v England	12 Apr 1926	Pontypridd	Back
30	Jack Gore	RU Test v Ireland	1924	Cardiff	RL Test v New Zealand	4 Dec 1926	Pontypridd	Forward
31	David Morgan Jenkins	RU Test v England	1926	Cardiff	RL Test v England	26 Apr 1927	Broughton	Forward
32	Emlyn Watkins	RU Test v Scotland	1926	Edinburgh	RL Test v England	6 Apr 1927	Salford	Forward
33	David Jenkins	RU Test v Australia	1927	Cardiff	RL Test v England	6 Apr 1927	Salford	Forward
34	Candy Evans	RU Test v England	1924	Swansea	RL Test v England	14 Nov 1928	Cardiff	Forward
35	Edwin Williams	RU Test v New Zealand	1924	Swansea	RL Test v England	14 Nov 1928	Cardiff	Half-back
36	Tommy Rees	RU Test v Ireland	1926	Swansea	RL Test Great Britain v Australia	5 Oct 1929	Hull	Back
37	Billy Williams	RU Test v England	1927	London	RL Test Great Britain v Australia	15 Jan 1930	Rochdale	Forward
38	Gwyn Davies	RU Test v France	1928	Paris	RL Test v England	27 Jan 1932	Salford	Back
39	Trevor 'Ocker' Thomas	RU Test v England	1930	Cardiff	RL Test v England	27 Jan 1932	Salford	Forward
40	Norman Fender	RU Test v Ireland	1930	Swansea	RL Test v England	27 Jan 1932	Salford	Forward
41	Dicky Ralph	RU Test v France	1931	Swansea	RL Test v Australia	30 Dec 1933	Wembley	Half-back
42	Iorrie Isaacs	RU Test v England	1933	London	RL Test v Australia	30 Dec 1933	Wembley	Forward
43	Lewis Rees	RU Test v Ireland	1933	Belfast	RL Test v France	1 Jan 1935	Bordeaux	Forward
44	Gomer Hughes	RU Test v England	1934	Cardiff	RL Test v France	1 Jan 1935	Wigan	Forward
45	Con Murphy	RU Test v England	1935	Swansea	RL Test v England	1 Jan 1935	Bordeaux	Forward
46	Bert Day	RU Test v Scotland	1930	Edinburgh	RL Test v England	10 Apr 1935	Liverpool	Forward
47	Tommy Scourfield	RU Test v France	1930	Paris	RL Test v England	10 Apr 1935	Liverpool	Back
48	Jack Morley	RU Test v England	1929	London	RL 1st Test Great Britain v Australia	19 Jun 1936	Sydney	Back
49	Dai Prosser	RU Test v Scotland	1934	Murrayfield	RL Test v England	7 Nov 1936	Pontypridd	Forward
50	Harold Thomas	RU Test v England	1936	Swansea	RL Test v England	5 Nov 1938	Llanelli	Forward
51	Arthur Bassett	RU Test v Ireland	1934	Swansea	RL Test v England	23 Dec 1939	Odsal	Back
52	Syd Williams	RU Test v England	1939	London	RL Test v England	9 Nov 1940	Oldham	Back
53	Eddie Watkins	RU Test v New Zealand	1935	Cardiff	RL Test v England	18 Oct 1941	Bradford	Forward
54	Emrys Evans	RU Test v England	1937	London	RL Test v England	10 Mar 1945	Wigan	Forward
55	Idwal Davies	RU Test v England	1939	London	RL Test v England	10 Mar 1945	Wigan	Back
56	Willie Davies	RU Test v Ireland	1936	Cardiff	RL Test Great Britain v New Zealand	1 Aug 1946	Auckland	Half-back
57	George Parsons	RU Test v England	1947	Cardiff	RL Test v Australia	20 Nov 1948	Swansea	Forward
58	Leslie Williams	RU Test v England	1947	Cardiff	RL Test v England	22 Oct 1949	Wigan	Back
59	Terence Cook	RU Test v Scotland	1949	Edinburgh	RL Test v Other Nationalities	31 Mar 1951	Swansea	Back
60	Ray Cale	RU Test v England	1949	Cardiff	RL Test v Other Nationalities	1 Dec 1951	Swansea	Forward
61	Lewis Jones	RU Test v England	1950	London	RL Test v France	13 Dec 1953	Marseille	Back
62	Garfield Owen	RU Test v Ireland	1955	Cardiff	RL Test v France	1 Mar 1959	Toulouse	Back
63	Colin Evans	RU Test v England	1960	London	RL Test v England	17 Feb 1963	Toulouse	Half-back
64	John Mantle	RU Test v England	1964	London	RL Test Great Britain v France	16 Jan 1966	Perpignan	Forward
65	Malcolm Price	RU Test v England	1959	Cardiff	RL Test Great Britain v Australia	21 Oct 1967	Leeds	Back
66	John Warlow	RU Test v England	1962	Cardiff	RL Test Great Britain v France	2 Jun 1968	Auckland	Forward
67	Kel Coslett	RU Test v England	1962	London	RL Test v England	7 Nov 1968	Salford	Back
68	David Watkins	RU Test v England	1963	Cardiff	RL Test v England	7 Nov 1968	Salford	Back
69	Terry Price	RU Test v England	1965	Cardiff	RL Test v England	7 Nov 1968	Salford	Back
70	Maurice Richards	RU Test v Ireland	1968	Lansdowne Road	RL Test v France	23 Oct 1969	Salford	Back
71	Keith Jarrett	RU Test v England	1967	Cardiff	RL Test vs France	25 Jan 1970	Perpignan	Back
72	Keri Jones	RU Test v New Zealand	1967	Cardiff	RL Test Great Britain v New Zealand	31 Oct 1970	Swinton	Back
73	Roy Mathias	RU Test v France	1970	Cardiff	RL Test v England	2 Mar 1975	Toulouse	Back
74	Bobby Wanbon	RU Test v England	1968	London	RL Test v England	10 Jun 1975	Brisbane	Forward
75	Stuart Gallacher	RU Test v France	1970	Cardiff	RL Test v New Zealand	2 Nov 1975	Swansea	Forward
76	John Bevan	RU Test v England	1971	Cardiff	RL 1st Test Great Britain v Australia	15 Jun 1974	Brisbane	Back
77	Glyn Shaw	RU Test v New Zealand	1972	Cardiff	RL Test v France	15 Jan 1978	Widnes	Forward
78	Clive Griffiths	RU Test v England	1979	Cardiff	RL Test v France	26 Jan 1980	Widnes	Back
79	Tommy David	RU Test v France	1973	Paris	RL match v England	8 Nov 1981	Cardiff	Back
80	Steve Fenwick	RU Test v France	1975	Paris	RL match v England	8 Nov 1981	Cardiff	Back
81	Paul Ringer	RU Test v New Zealand	1978	Cardiff	RL Test v England	8 Nov 1981	Cardiff	Forward
82	Brynmor Williams	RU Test British Lions v New Zealand	1977	Wellington	RL Test v England	24 Oct 1982	Cardiff	Half-back
83	David Bishop	RU Test v Australia	1984	Cardiff	RL Test Great Britain v France	7 Apr 1990	Leeds	Half-back
84	Jonathan Davies	RU Test v England	1985	Cardiff	RL Test Great Britain v Papua New Guinea	27 May 1990	Goroka	Centre
85	Robert Ackerman	RU Test v New Zealand	1980	Cardiff	RL Test v Papua New Guinea	17 Oct 1991	Swansea	Back
86	Gary Pearce	RU Test v Ireland	1981	Cardiff	RL Test v Papua New Guinea	17 Oct 1991	Swansea	Half-back
87	Paul Moriarty	RU Test v Ireland	1986	Dublin	RLWC Great Britain v Papua New Guinea	9 Nov 1991	Wigan	Forward
88	Anthony Sullivan	RLWC Great Britain v Papua New Guinea	1991	Wigan	RU v Argentina	10 Nov 2001	Cardiff	Back
89	John Devereux	RU Test v England	1986	London	RL Test Great Britain v France	16 Feb 1992	Perpignan	Wing
90	Mark Jones	RU Test v Scotland	1987	Edinburgh	RL Test Great Britain v France	16 Feb 1992	Perpignan	Forward
91	Allan Bateman	RU Test v Scotland	1990	Cardiff	RLWC Great Britain v France	7 Mar 1992	Hull	Centre
92	Richard Webster	RU Test v Australia	1987	Rotorua	RL Test v France	4 Mar 1994	Cardiff	Forward
93	Dai Young	RWC Qtr-final v England	1987	Brisbane	RLWC v France	9 Oct 1995	Cardiff	Forward
94	Adrian Hadley	RU Test v Romania	1983	Bucharest	RLWC v France	9 Oct 1995	Cardiff	Back
95	Rowland Phillips	RU Test v USA	1987	Cardiff	RLWC v France	9 Oct 1995	Cardiff	Forward
96	Scott Gibbs	RU Test v England	1991	Cardiff	RLWC v France	9 Oct 1995	Cardiff	Back
97	Scott Quinnell	RU Test v Canada	1993	Cardiff	RLWC v France	9 Oct 1995	Cardiff	Forward
98	Iestyn Harris	RLWC v France	1995	Cardiff	RU v Argentina	10 Nov 2001	Cardiff	Back
99	Gareth Thomas	RUWC v Japan	1995	Bloemfontein	RL Test v Italy	6 Oct 2010	Wrexham	Back

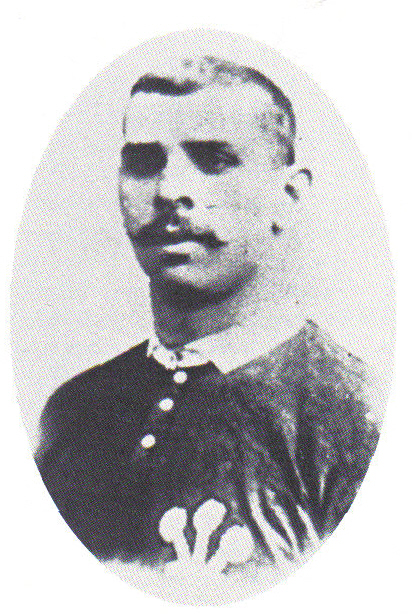
Dai Jones

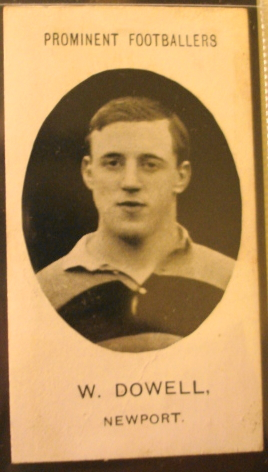
William Dowell

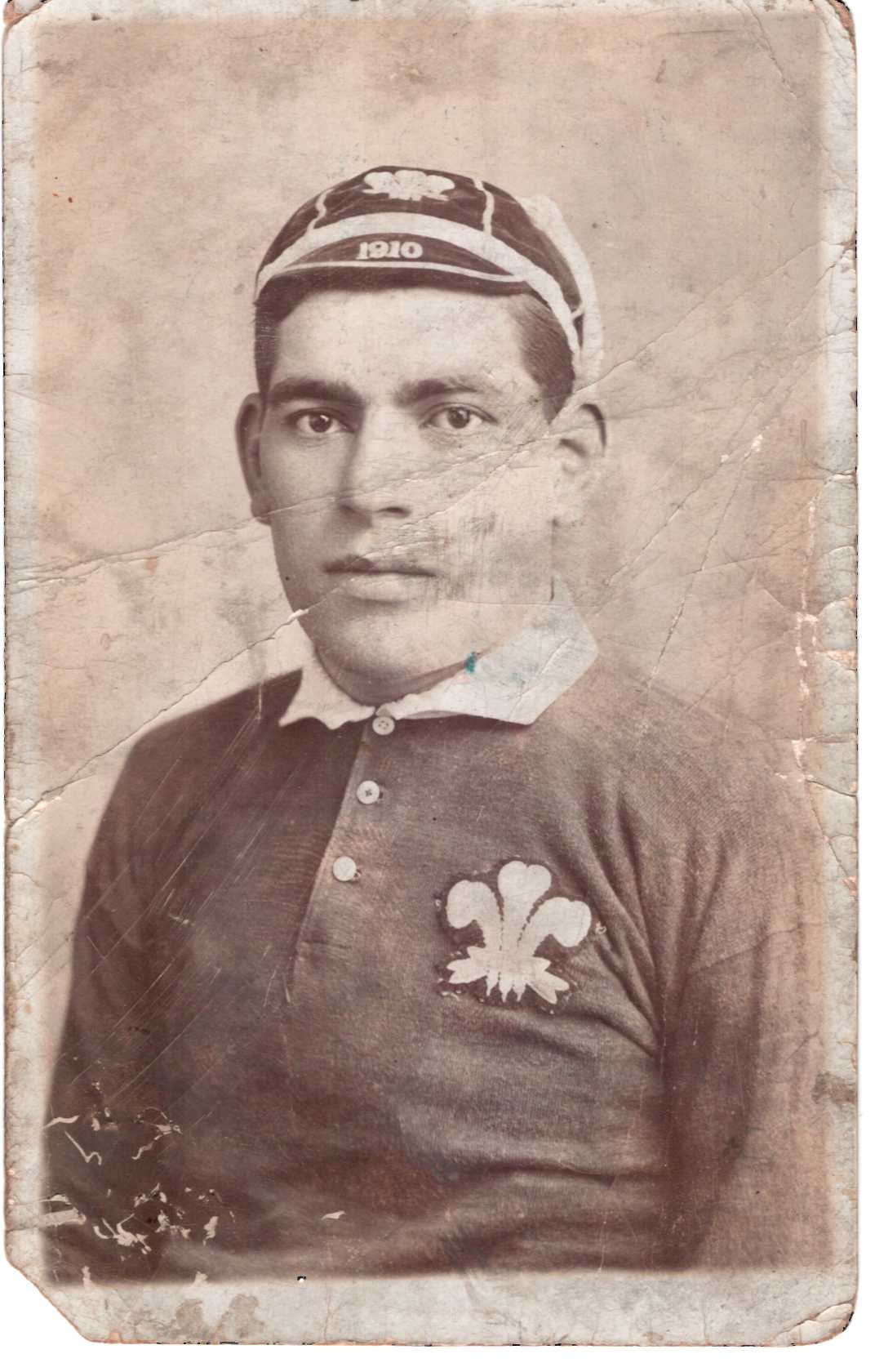
Ben Gronow

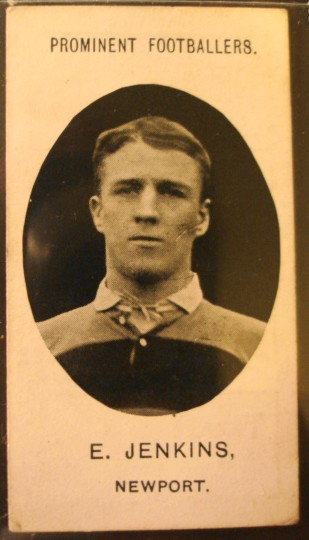
Ernie Jenkins

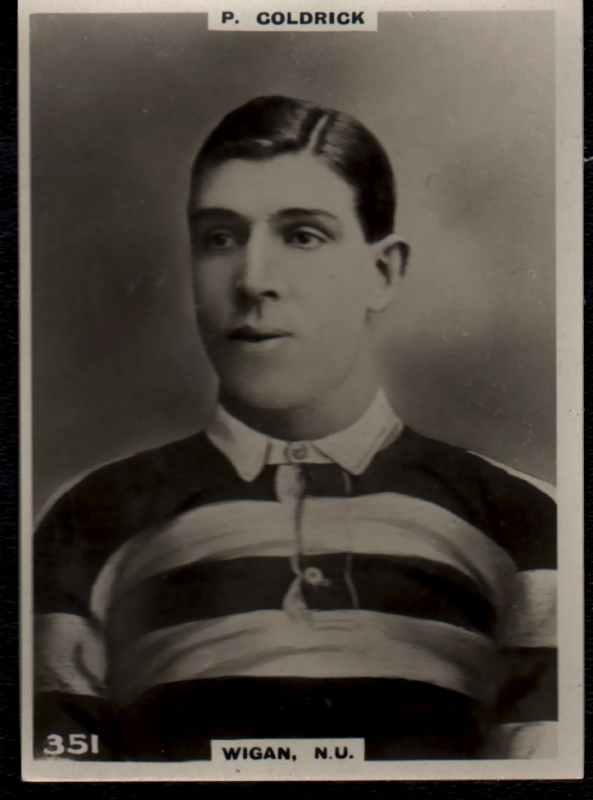
Percy Coldrick

== More than one country ==
No.	Player	International Debut	Year	At	Cross Code Debut	Date	At	Position
1	Dally Messenger	2nd RU Test Australia v New Zealand	1907	Brisbane	RL New Zealand v Wales	1 Jan 1908	Aberdare	Centre
2	Frederick Stanley Jackson	RU British Lions tour of Australasia	1908		RL New Zealand v Great Britain	1910	Auckland	Back
3	Thomas Woods	RU England v Scotland	1920	London	1st RL Test Wales v Australia	10 Dec 1921	Taff Vale Park, Pontypridd	Forward/Second-row
4	Peter Williams	RU England v Scotland	1987	London	1st RL Test Wales v France	13 Dec 1992	Stade Gilbert Brutus, Perpignan	Fly-half/Interchange/Substitute
5	Emosi Koloto	RU Test Tonga v Wales	1986	Nuku A'lofa	RL New Zealand v ?	1991		Forward
6	John Schuster	RU Test New Zealand v Australia	1988	Sydney	RL Western Samoa v France	5 Sep 1995	Cardiff	Back
7	Va'aiga Tuigamala	RWC New Zealand v USA	1991	Gloucester	RLWC Western Samoa v France	12 Oct 1995	Cardiff	Back
8	Ian Noble	RU Test Zimbabwe v Wales	1993	Bulawayo	RLWC South Africa v Papua New Guinea	2 Nov 2000	Toulouse	Back
9	Henry Paul	RL Test New Zealand v France	1995	Auckland	RU England v France	2 Mar 2002	Saint-Denis	Back
10	Michael Horak	RL South Africa v ?	1997?		RU England v Argentina	22 Jun 2002	Buenos Aires	Back
11	Lote Tuqiri	RLWC Fiji v Russia	2000		1st RU Test Australia v Ireland	7 Jun 2003	Perth	Winger
12	Coenraad Breytenbach	RLWC South Africa v Tonga	2000		RU Russia v Georgia	2002		Centre
13	Brad Thorn	RL (SL) Test Australia v New Zealand	1997	Sydney	RU New Zealand v Wales	21 Jun 2003	Hamilton	Forward
14	Maurie Fa'asavalu	Rugby Union Samoa v South Africa	2002	Pretoria	RL Test Great Britain v New Zealand	27 Oct 2007	Huddersfield	Forward
15	Lesley Vainikolo	RL ANZAC Test New Zealand v Australia	1999	Sydney	RU England v Wales	2 Feb 2008	London	Wing
16	Craig Gower	RL (SL) Test Australia v New Zealand	1997	Sydney	RU Test Italy v Australia	13 Jun 2009	Canberra Stadium	Fly-half / five-eighth
17	Shontayne Hape	RL Tri-Nations Test New Zealand v Great Britain	2004	Hull	RU Test England v Australia	12 Jun 2010	Perth	Back
18	Tasesa Lavea	RL ANZAC Test New Zealand v Australia	2000	?	RU Samoa v Ireland	13 Nov 2010	Dublin	Back
19	Cooper Vuna	RLWC Tonga v Ireland	2008	Parramatta	RU Test Australia v Wales	9 Jun 2012	Brisbane	Back
20	Craig Wing	RL Test Australia v New Zealand	2002	Wellington	RU Japan v UAE	10 May 2013	Dubai	Utility/Back
21	Ben Te'o	RLWC Samoa vs France	2008	Sydney	RU England vs South Africa	12 Nov 2016	Twickenham	Centre
22	Marika Koroibete	RLWC Fiji v Ireland	2013	Rochdale	1st RU Test Australia v Argentina	16 Sep 2017	Canberra	Winger
23	Te Kura Ngata-Aerengamate	RU Test New Zealand v Australia	2014	Rotorua International Stadium	RL Test Australia v Cook Islands	2017	Southern Cross Group Stadium	Hooker
24	Eto Nabuli	Four Nations Qualifier Samoa v Fiji	2014	Penrith	RU test Australia v Scotland	2017	Sydney	Wing
25	Suliasi Vunivalu	RL test Tonga v Fiji	2017	Sydney	RU test Australia v England	16 Jul 2022	Sydney	Fullback
26	Joseph Sua'ali'i	RLWC Samoa v England	2022	Newcastle upon Tyne	RU test England v Australia	9 Nov 2024	London	Centre
27	Mark Friel	RU Norway v Jamacia	2025	Chiswick	RL Germany v Malta	3 Oct 2026	Hattingen	Centre

Dally Messenger

Messenger played for Australia in rugby union, and for both New Zealand and Australia in rugby league. One week after his final Test appearance as a Wallaby, Messenger, who was born in Australia, toured Great Britain at the invitation of the New Zealand All Golds in 1907. He made his international rugby league debut on that tour representing New Zealand. His Australian international Test debut was made in Sydney in Australia's inaugural rugby league Test v the Kiwis on 9 May 1908. He made six further international rugby league appearances for Australia.

Emosi Koloto

Koloto grew up in New Zealand playing rugby union and represented Tonga in the code before switching to league and moving to England. He was called up into the Kiwis in 1991 from the Widnes club and played five tests that year.

John Schuster

Schuster first played rugby union, representing both Samoa and New Zealand. Later he switched to rugby league and captained Western Samoa in two pool games at the 1995 World Cup.

Henry Paul

Paul was born in New Zealand. His senior club rugby league career was played in England but between 1995 and 2001 he regularly returned to New Zealand to make international appearances for the Kiwis. When he switched to union in 2002 he became eligible to represent England by ancestry of his grandfather and he did so in 2002.

Brad Thorn

Thorn was born in Mosgiel, New Zealand. From age eight he played rugby league in Queensland and aged twenty-two he played for Australia during the Super League split year. When the code reunited in 1998 he also played for Australia.

In 2001 he moved to New Zealand and switched to rugby union. He appeared in twelve Tests for New Zealand (the All Blacks) from 2003. For 2005–06 he returned to the National Rugby League in Australia, winning a premiership with the Brisbane Broncos and playing at state level again. In 2008 he switched to rugby union for a second time and was again selected for the All Blacks.

Michael Horak

Horak was born in South Africa and represented South Africa in rugby league. He switched to rugby union in 1998 moving to England to play with the Leicester Tigers. He qualifies to represent England via his English mother and did so in 2002.

Lesley Vainikolo

Vainikolo was born in Tonga but raised in New Zealand playing rugby league at school. His league club career was played with the Canberra Raiders in Australia and the Bradford Bulls in England. During that period he made twelve national representative appearances for New Zealand (the Kiwis).

He took up rugby union with Gloucester Rugby in 2007. He was eligible to play for Tonga by birth, New Zealand by parentage or England by residence. He had previously declined to play for Tonga in the 2007 Rugby World Cup so that he could play for his adopted nation. He made his international rugby union debut for England v Wales in February 2008 and played in five tests that season.

Craig Gower

After a successful eleven year Australian rugby league career from 1996 to 2007 with the Penrith Panthers, during which he made five State of Origin appearances for New South Wales and twenty-three Test appearances for Australia (5 for the Super League team and 18 for the ARL team), Gower moved to Europe, switched codes and signed with French rugby union side Bayonne from 2008. He is eligible to play for Italy through his Italian grandfather. He was selected for Italy on their mid-season tour of Australia and New Zealand in 2009.

Shontayne Hape

Hape, a New Zealand Mãori, had a very successful rugby league career in both hemispheres, first with the New Zealand Warriors in the NRL (1999–2002) and then with the Bradford Bulls in the Super League (2003–2008). He made his Test debut for New Zealand in the 2004 Tri-Nations, and eventually appeared in 14 Tests for New Zealand. Hape switched codes in 2008, signing with Bath, for whom he still plays. Under IRB rules, he was already eligible to represent England on residency grounds, having lived there for well over the three years required to qualify. Hape made his union Test debut for England in 2010 against Australia.

Maurie Fa'asavalu

Maurie Fa'asavalu is a Samoan rugby union player who formerly played rugby league for St Helens. He was picked in the Great Britain rugby league squad after living in England for 4 years. He also played for England in the 2008 Rugby League World Cup

Bill Hardcastle

A New Zealander and an 1897 All Black, Hardcastle journeyed to Sydney in 1899 on hearing that the visiting British rugby union team would be not be travelling to New Zealand. Australian rugby in those days had no residential rules and once he joined Sydney's Glebe RU club he qualified for Australian national selection. He was chosen for Australia in the fourth test of 1899 against Great Britain.

In rugby league he made two Test appearances for Australia and six minor appearances on the 1908 Kangaroo tour.

Va'aiga Tuigamala

Tuigamala was nicknamed 'Inga the Winger' and initially represented New Zealand in rugby union. He then switched codes, joining Wigan in 1993. While playing league he represented Western Samoa at the 1995 World Cup. When rugby union turned professional he returned to his original code. Between 1996 and 2000 he represented Samoa in rugby union.

Lote Tuqiri

Born in Fiji, Tuqiri was a junior Australian rugby league international at age 19 in 1998. When he missed selection for Australia's 2000 Rugby League World Cup squad he opted to play for Fiji and captained the side in their three pool match appearances. He later played four rugby league Tests for Australia in 2001 before his 2003 switch to union and a long international representative career in that code.

Fred Jackson

Jackson toured Australasia with the 1908 Anglo-Welsh Lions. However, during the tour he was accused of professionalism and recalled to England by the Rugby Football Union. Jackson left the touring party but failed to return to England to face the accusations. In 1910 Jackson played rugby league in New Zealand and represented both Auckland and New Zealand against the touring Great Britain side.

== First dual-code rugby international ==
England's Anthony Starks and Wales' Jack Rhapps took the field in the inaugural rugby league international of 5 April 1904 between England and Other Nationalities Starks had made two rugby union Test appearances for England in 1896, and Rhapps had made a single rugby union Test appearance for Wales in 1897, and thus in April 1904 they became the world's first dual rugby code internationals.

The first tour matches played by the New Zealand All Golds in Britain in Nov & Dec 1907 would have seen international cross-code debuts by some of the seven touring former All Blacks. At this stage of the tour the New Zealanders were still familiarising themselves with the new Northern Union rules which they had not seen until they arrived in Leeds in October. The first full international of the tour against Wales on New Year's Day 1908 saw confirmed appearances by Mackrell, Turtill, Wrigley, Johnston & Cross for New Zealand and David Jones for Wales. Thus New Zealand's first five dual-code rugby internationals all achieved that feat in the same match.

== Other firsts and lasts ==
- First man to debut in rugby league before debuting in union – Karl Ifwersen Sep 1921
- Last man to debut in rugby league before debuting in rugby union – Marika Koroibete, October 2013
- Last man to debut in rugby union before debuting in rugby league – Mark Friel for Norway in 2025, Tomasz Pozniak for Poland in February 2020, and before that Mirco Bergamasco, October 2016
- Most recent dual rugby code international – Mark Friel on 3 October 2026 for Malta Knights against Germany, Mark Nawaqanitawase on 25 October 2025 for the Australian Kangaroos against the England national rugby league team. Tomasz Pozniak for Poland, November 2022, and before that Marika Koroibete, September 2017

== Dual-code internationals who also represented in a third sport ==
Michael Cleary represented Australia in track & field at the Commonwealth Games making him an international at the senior level in three sports. Dick Thornett achieved the same distinction having also represented for Australia in water polo at the 1960 Rome Olympics. Dai Bishop represented Wales in British Baseball.

== See also ==
- Comparison of rugby league and rugby union
- List of rugby union players who have represented more than one nation
- List of players who have converted from one football code to another
- Clash of Codes
