= Emrys Evans (rugby) =

Wales international dual-code rugby footballer

Personal information
- Full name: Emrys Evans
- Born: 24 April 1911 Gwaun-Cae-Gurwen, Neath Port Talbot, Wales
- Died: 23 June 1983 (aged 72) Bristol, England

Playing information

Rugby union
- Position: Flanker
Club
Years	Team	Pld	T	G	FG	P
≤1937–≥39	Llanelli RFC
Representative
Years	Team	Pld	T	G	FG	P
1937–39	Wales	3	0	0	0	0

Rugby league
- Position: Prop
Club
Years	Team	Pld	T	G	FG	P
1939	Salford	8	2	0	0	6
1946	Wigan	8	1	0	0	3
	Total	16	3	0	0	9
Representative
Years	Team	Pld	T	G	FG	P
1945	Wales	1

Emrys Evans (24 April 1911 – 23 June 1983) was a Welsh dual-code international rugby union, and professional rugby league footballer who played in the 1930s and 1940s. He played representative level rugby union (RU) for Wales, and at club level for Llanelli RFC, as a flanker, and representative level rugby league (RL) for Wales, and at club level for Salford and Wigan, as a prop.

== Background ==
Emrys Evans was born in Gwaun-Cae-Gurwen, Neath Port Talbot, Wales, and he died aged 72 in Bristol, Avon.

== International honours ==
Emrys Evans won caps for Wales (RU) while at Llanelli RFC in 1937 against England, and in 1939 against Scotland, and Ireland, and won a cap for Wales (RL) while at Salford in 1945.
