= The First Kangaroos =

- Based on: An original idea by Frank Cvitanovich
- Written by: Nigel Williams
- Directed by: Frank Cvitanovich
- Starring: Dennis Waterman; Chris Haywood; Dominic Sweeney
- Music by: William Motzing
- Countries of origin: United Kingdom; Australia
- Original language: English

Production
- Producer: Moya Iceton
- Cinematography: Ross Berryman
- Editor: Richard Hindley
- Running time: 101 minutes
- Production companies: Roadshow, Coote & Carroll

Original release
- Release: 1988

The First Kangaroos is a 1988 British–Australian made for TV sports film directed by Frank Cvitanovich and starring Dennis Waterman, Chris Haywood and Dominic Sweeney.

== Synopsis ==
The First Kangaroos depicts the 1908–09 Kangaroo tour of Great Britain, the first-ever such tour by the Australia national rugby league team.

The film drew complaints from the granddaughter of British rugby league legend Albert Goldthorpe, for its villainous depiction of him.

Some scenes featured the grandstand of Arlington Oval in the inner-western Sydney suburb Dulwich Hill which hosted women's competitions of the 1938 British Empire Games.

== Cast ==
- Dennis Waterman ... Albert Goldthorpe
- Chris Haywood ... James Joseph "J J" Giltinan
- Dominic Sweeney ... Herbert Henry "Dally" Messenger
- Philip Quast ... Alex "Bluey" Burdon
- Tony Martin ... Dan Frawley
- Clarissa Kaye-Mason ... Mrs. Messenger
- Jim Carter ... Arthur Hughes
- Alex Broun ... Morton
- Wayne Pygram ... Albie Rosenfeld
- John Dicks ... Reverend Green
- Nell Schofield ... Betty
- Kelly Dingwall ... Jim Devereux
- Robert Giltinan ... Reporter
- Harold Kissin ... Trainer
- Allan Surtees ... George the Barman
- Wayne Pearce ... Sid "Sandy" Pearce
- Andrew Ettingshausen ... Conlon
- Ian Gilmour ... Steamship Official

Both Wayne Pearce (Balmain Tigers) and Andrew Ettingshausen (Cronulla-Sutherland Sharks) were current Australian rugby league test players when the film was released. Pearce had been a member of the undefeated 1982 Kangaroo tour, while Ettingshausen would go on to be the leading try scorer on both the 1990 and 1994 Kangaroo Tours.

== Reception ==
Karen Hardy of The Sydney Morning Herald, reviewing the film in 2013 said, "Sure, it wasn't the finest sports movie ever made but there was humour – intentional or not, I wasn't quite sure – and conflict and pathos. And its story, which it admitted in the opening credits was sort of based on true events, was an interesting one."
