= J. J. Giltinan =

Australian entrepreneur and rugby league administrator (1866–1950)

James Joseph Giltinan
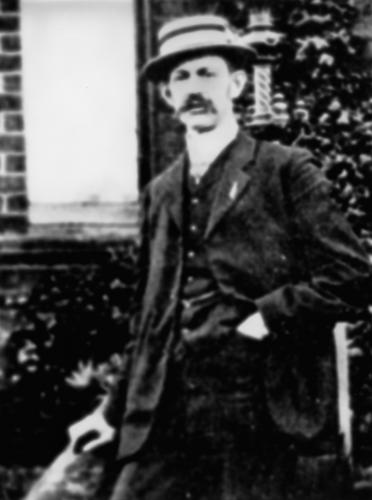
- Born: 30 August 1866
- Died: 6 September 1950 (aged 84)
- Relatives: Bob Giltinan

James Joseph Giltinan (1866–1950) was an Australian entrepreneur who helped to introduce the sport of rugby league football to Australia. The J. J. Giltinan Shield, which is awarded annually to the National Rugby League minor premiers, was named after him.

== Founder and administrator ==
=== Founder of rugby league in Australia ===
On 8 August 1907 at Bateman's Crystal Hotel, George Street, Sydney politician Henry Hoyle chaired a meeting of fifty, including several leading rugby players and officials. The New South Wales Rugby Football League, the body that would go on to conduct the major national rugby league premiership of Australia, was founded and Giltinan was elected its first secretary. Before that he had invited the 1907 "All Golds" New Zealand professional rugby team to tour Australia en route to Britain.

Giltinan led the first Kangaroo tour to England in 1908.

An all-round sports enthusiast, Giltinan had also officiated as an umpire in representative cricket matches.

At the beginning of the season, the 1909 NSWRFL season the League had met and kicked out its founders, Giltinan, Victor Trumper and Henry Hoyle, although Giltinan remained Hon. Secretary of the New South Wales Rugby League from its inception until the final six months of his life, resigning due to ill health in the early months of 1950.

Giltinan was also President of the Annandale Rugby League Club during the club's early years.

=== Sailing administrator ===
In 1935, Giltinan formed a breakaway from the established Sydney Flying Squadron. His tenure at the Australian 18 Footers League culminated in his founding the JJ Giltinan International Trophy. This event is effectively the world championships for the spectacular 18ft Skiff class and is contested each year on Sydney Harbour.

== Death, funeral and tributes ==
J J Giltinan's last public appearance was when he watched the Kangaroos win The Ashes at the S.C.G. on 22 July 1950. He died less than three months later, on 6 September 1950.

His funeral was held the following day at St. Clement's Church, Marrickville. Many former Rugby League identities were on hand to say farewell, including members of the 1907 Pioneers and members of the original Kangaroos of 1908-1909, such as Alf Dobbs, Sid Deane, Dan Frawley, Ed Fry, Bob Graves, Harry Glanville, Arthur Hennessy, Andy Morton and Larry O'Malley. The President of the New South Wales Rugby League, Harry "Jersey" Flegg also attended the large funeral.

The J J Giltinan Shield was created for the following New South Wales Rugby Football League season in his honour.

Giltinan was awarded life membership of the New South Wales Rugby League in 1914.

Giltinan was born on 30 August 1866 and is a relative of notable Australian tennis professional Bob Giltinan.

In The First Kangaroos, a 1988 British–Australian made for TV sports film, the role of James Giltinan was played by well known Australian actor Chris Haywood.

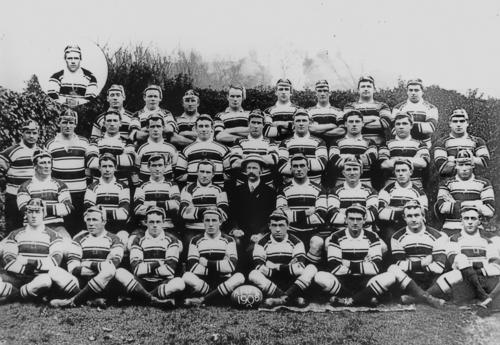
Giltinan (2nd row centre in suit) Pioneer Kangaroos 1908-09

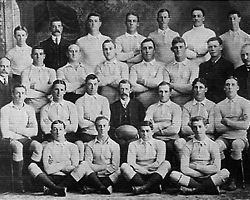
Giltinan, 2nd row centre, with the NSW rugby team who played the All Golds in Sydney 1907

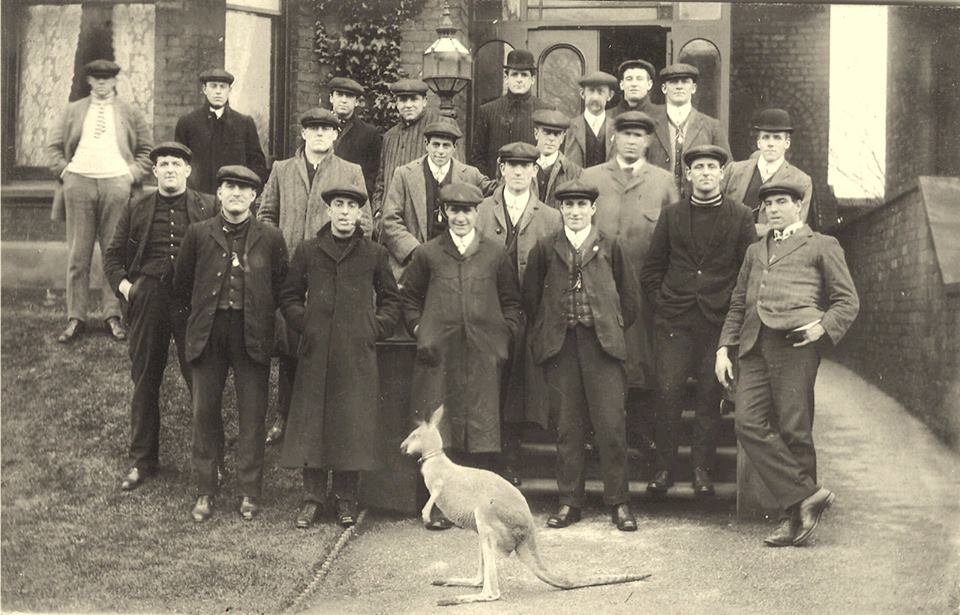
Giltinan middle of back four (blurred with moustache) 1908 Kangaroos

In August 2019, Giltinan was inducted into the National Rugby League Hall of Fame.
