= Robert Graves (rugby) =

Australian rugby player

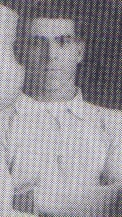

Personal information
- Born: Robert Henderson Graves; 1 September 1883; Sydney, New South Wales
- Died: 15 February 1958 (aged 74); Hurstville, New South Wales

Playing information

Rugby union
- Position: Prop Forward
Club
Years	Team	Pld	T	G	FG	P
1901–02	Grosvenor Club
1903–04	Gipps Club
1905	Balmain
	Total	0	0	0	0	0
Representative
Years	Team	Pld	T	G	FG	P
1907	Australia	1				0
1905	Metropolis (Sydney)

Rugby league
- Position: Forward
Club
Years	Team	Pld	T	G	FG	P
1908–13	Balmain	57	12	1	0	38
1919	Annandale	7	1	0	0	3
	Total	64	13	1	0	41
Representative
Years	Team	Pld	T	G	FG	P
1908–09	New South Wales	17				12
1908–09	Australia	6	1			3

Coaching information
Club
Years	Team	Gms	W	D	L	W%
1908–13	Balmain	76	33	2	41	43

Robert Henderson Graves (1 September 1883 – 15 February 1958) was a pioneer Australian rugby league and rugby union player and one of his country's first dual-code internationals. He was a versatile forward for the Australia national team. He played in 6 Tests between 1908 and 1909, as captain on 1 occasion. In 1907 he played for New South Wales in the first rugby match run by the newly created 'New South Wales Rugby Football League' which had just split away from the established New South Wales Rugby Football Union.

== Rugby union career ==
Graves grew up in inner city Balmain in Sydney. He played rugby union at Fort Street School and later represented for his senior school Hawkesbury Agricultural College. From there he was graded to play rugby union with the West Sydney Juniors - an inner city club. He played with the Grosvenor Club (another inner Sydney club) until 1902. He then joined the Gipps Club in the Balmain area with whom he won the Sydney rugby union premiership in 1904.

He joined the Balmain club in the metropolitan rugby competition in 1905 and from there was selected to represent Metropolis (Sydney) in a fixture against Country played over Easter in 1905. He continued in a coaching role for the Grosvenor club even while himself playing rugby for those other sides from 1903 to 1907.

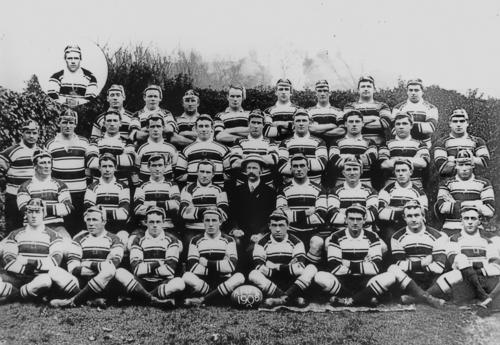
Graves (2nd row far right) Pioneer Kangaroos 1908-09

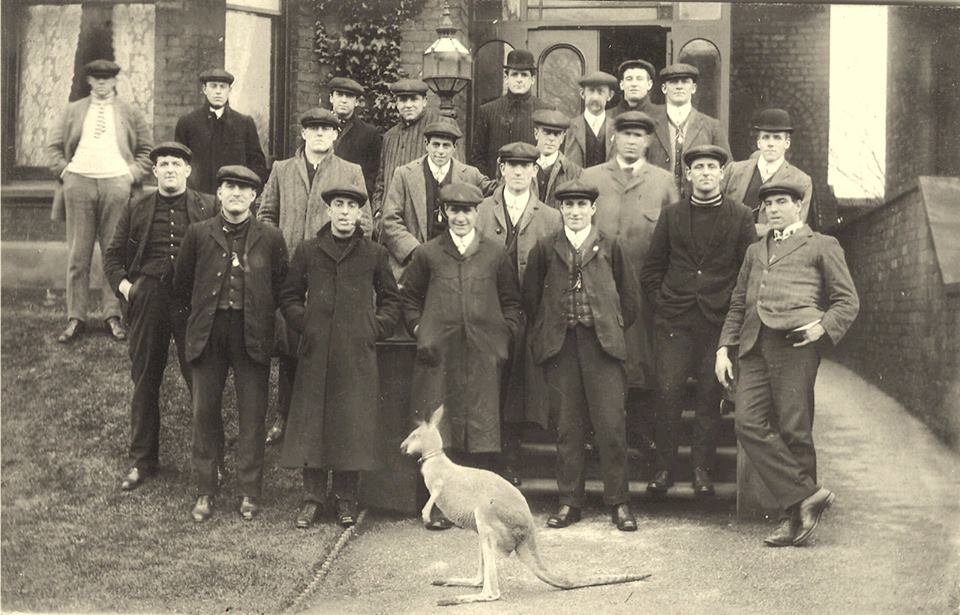
Graves front far right with a group of the 1908 Kangaroos

== Rugby league career ==
Graves was one of the New South Wales rugby union players who matched up against the first professional New Zealand team, Albert Baskiville's 'All Golds' in three matches in Sydney in August 1907. He played in all three matches and along with the other Australian rebel players was promptly blacklisted by the New South Wales Rugby Union for breaching its fundamental principle of amateurism.

Graves was at the foundation meetings of the break-away code in 1908 and was named as foundation captain of the Balmain Tigers. He led the Tigers in their first ever game on 20 April 1908 against Easts.

Graves was selected in all three games against New Zealand for Australia's inaugural Test series of 1908. He was a member of the first Kangaroo side which toured Britain in 1908–09. He appeared in 23 games on tour including the deciding 3rd Test at Birmingham in February 1909.

In 1909 he played in the 1st and 3rd Tests against New Zealand in Sydney. He captained his country in the 3rd Test victory becoming at that point Australia's sixth Test captain. He is listed on the Australian Players Register as Kangaroo No. 6.

The second wave of Wallaby defectors to rugby league in 1909 (Chris McKivat's Olympic Gold Medal Wallabies) spelled the end of Graves' representative career. Though only 26 years old he did not play another Test. He played a further 5 seasons with Balmain retiring in 1913.

He was awarded Life Membership of the New South Wales Rugby League in 1914.

== Dual international recognition ==
Both the Whiticker and Whiticker/Collis references record that in 1907 Graves represented New South Wales in rugby union and in that same year came on as a replacement for John Rosewell in the Wallabies v All Blacks 1st Test in Sydney. This makes Graves a dual code rugby international and he is listed as such in the 1991 edition of the Andrews reference.

He is however not listed among the Australian dual-code internationals in sources such as the "2005 Rugby League Annual" or in editions of "Australian Sporting Records". Presumably (and erroneously) this may be due to his status in making his single Wallaby appearance as a reserve rather than from the run-on side.

Sporting positions
Preceded by	Coach Balmain; 1908–1913	Succeeded by Bill Kelly; 1914–1915
Preceded by Larry O'Malley	Captain Australia; 1910	Succeeded by Bill Heidke

== Published works ==
- Whiticker, Alan (2004) Captaining the Kangaroos, New Holland, Sydney
- Andrews, Malcolm (2006) The ABC of Rugby League Austn Broadcasting Corpn, Sydney
- Whiticker, Alan & Collis, Ian (2006) The History of Rugby League Clubs, New Holland, Sydney
