= Denis Lutge =

Australian RL coach and international dual-code rugby footballer

Personal information
- Born: 26 November 1879 Sydney, New South Wales
- Died: 18 February 1953 (aged 73) Mosman, New South Wales

Playing information

Rugby union
- Position: Lock
Club
Years	Team	Pld	T	G	FG	P
1901–07	Northern Suburbs
Representative
Years	Team	Pld	T	G	FG	P
	New South Wales
1903–04	Australia	4	0	0	0	0

Rugby league
- Position: Forward
Club
Years	Team	Pld	T	G	FG	P
1908	North Sydney	4	1	0	0	3
Representative
Years	Team	Pld	T	G	FG	P
1908	New South Wales	1	0	0	0	0
1908	Australia	3	2	0	0	6

Coaching information
Club
Years	Team	Gms	W	D	L	W%
1915–16	North Sydney	28	7	0	21	25
Representative
Years	Team	Gms	W	D	L	W%
1909	New Zealand Māori

Denis "Dinny" Lutge (26 November 1879 – 18 February 1953) was a pioneer Australian rugby league and rugby union player, a dual-code international. He was the second ever captain of the Australian national rugby league team and the first to lead the side to victory.

== Rugby union career ==
A Mosman, New South Wales stevedore, Lutge commenced his rugby career with the Mosman Juniors in 1893, before playing for Sydney's Northern Suburbs club from 1901 until 1907. He made his international début as a lock-forward in the first ever rugby union test match played between the Australian team and the All Blacks in Sydney, on 15 August 1903. He went on to appear in all three of Australia's Test losses in 1904 against the visiting British Lions.

== Rugby league career ==
Lutge was named foundation captain of the North Sydney District Rugby League Football Club in 1908. Lutge represented New South Wales that year and in May, along with two other of the five inaugural selectors (Hennessy & Dore), Lutge picked himself for the first international rugby league matches against the visiting New Zealand team, drawing some press criticism in the process.

Along with Dally Messenger, Micky Dore, Doug McLean snr and Johnny Rosewell, Lutge was one of the inaugural five Australian dual code rugby internationals who débuted in international rugby league in Sydney on 9 May 1908 in the first Australian league Test against New Zealand.

Lutge enjoys the distinction of having played in each of Australia's inaugural rugby league and rugby union Test matches against New Zealand.

He was selected as captain for the 3rd Test in June 1908 and, playing at lock, led Australia to their first international rugby league victory after they had lost the earlier two Tests under Arthur Hennessy.

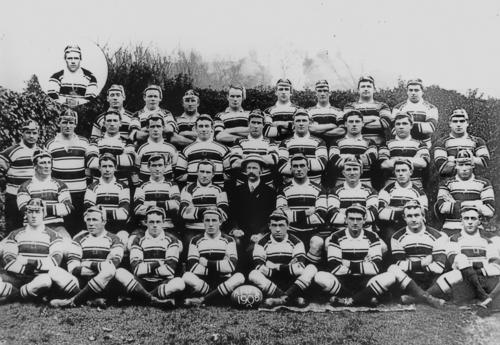
Lutge (3rd row seated to right of Giltinan in hat) Pioneer Kangaroos 1908–09

Lutge was selected by the playing squad as tour captain for the nine-month inaugural Kangaroo tour of 1908–09, but broke his arm before he had the opportunity to captain Australia against Great Britain. After Lutge's injury, the Australian test team was captained by Dally Messenger.

Upon returning to Australia he retired from football but continued working as a selector. He coached a visiting New Zealand Māori rugby league team against teams he was selecting in 1909. In 1915 he was selected as the North Sydney club's first ever coach, pioneering the concept of mid-week night training.

Lutge worked for more than fifty years for the Mosman council as a beach inspector and cleaner at Balmoral.

== Accolades ==
Lutge was awarded Life Membership of the New South Wales Rugby League in 1914.

Dinny Lutge is Kangaroo player #8 on the Australian Players Register (2005).

== Playing records ==
- Club: North Sydney "Shoremen" (1908) 3 games, 1 try
- Representative: Australia (1908), New South Wales (1908)

== Published sources ==
- Whiticker, Alan (2004) Captaining the Kangaroos, New Holland, Sydney
- Whiticker, Alan & Hudson, Glen (2006) The Encyclopedia of Rugby League Players, Gavin Allen Publishing, Sydney

Preceded by Arthur Hennessy	Captain Australia; 1908	Succeeded by Alex Burdon
