= Micky Dore =

Australia international dual-code rugby player

- Born: Michael Joseph Dore; 1 July 1883 Brisbane, Queensland
- Died: 13 August 1910 (aged 27) Spring Hill, Queensland
- School: St. Joseph's College, Gregory Terrace
- Notable relative(s): Edmund, Vince - brothers; Vince Dore - son
- Occupation: Saddler’s clerk

Rugby union career
- Position: scrum-half
Amateur team(s)
Years	Team	Apps	(Points)
1902-07	North Brisbane		
Provincial / State sides
Years	Team	Apps	(Points)
	Queensland	23	
International career
Years	Team	Apps	(Points)
1905	Australia	1	(0)
- Rugby league career

Playing information
- Position: Half-back
Representative
Years	Team	Pld	T	G	FG	P
1907	Queensland	2
1908–09	Australia	3				0

Michael Joseph Dore (1 July 1883 – 13 August 1910) was an Australian representative rugby union and rugby league footballer - a dual-code international. He was one of the founding fathers of rugby league in Queensland. Along with Dally Messenger, Denis Lutge, Doug McLean snr and John Rosewell he was one of the inaugural five Australian dual code rugby internationals who having earlier represented at rugby union, debuted in international rugby league in Sydney on 9 May 1908 in the first ever Australian league Test against New Zealand.

== Rugby union career ==
Dore was selected as scrum-half for the Australia national rugby union team against New Zealand, at Dunedin, on 2 September 1905. His elder brother Edmund had also represented Australia against the 1904 British Isles tourists.

== Rugby league career ==
Dore front 2nd from left

Dore's decision to switch codes in 1907 influenced many other Queensland union players including his brother, to join the Rugby League ranks. He was a member of the inaugural committee of the Queensland Rugby Football Association and was a foundation Australian selector. Along with two other of the five inaugural selectors (Arthur Hennessy & Lutge) Dore picked himself in 1908 for the first two rugby league internationals against New Zealand. He played in the first ever trans-Tasman test, which was the debut match of the Australia national rugby league team. He is listed on the Australian Players Register as Kangaroo No.5.

Dore was unable to get leave of absence from his job to attend the 1908–09 Kangaroo tour of England and made his 3rd and final rugby league Test appearance against New Zealand in Sydney in 1909. Altogether he played three Tests for the Australian national team as Half-Back.

== Sources ==
- Whiticker, Alan (2004) Captaining the Kangaroos, New Holland, Sydney
- Andrews, Malcolm (2006) The ABC of Rugby League, Austn Broadcasting Corpn, Sydney
