= Alf Dobbs =

Australian rugby league footballer

Personal information
- Full name: Alfred Dobbs
- Born: 18 September 1878; Sydney, New South Wales, Australia
- Died: 23 June 1954 (aged 75); Ryde, New South Wales, Australia

Playing information
- Position: Second-row
Club
Years	Team	Pld	T	G	FG	P
1908–09	Balmain Tigers	17	3	0	0	9
Representative
Years	Team	Pld	T	G	FG	P
1907	New South Wales	1	0	0	0	0
1908	Metropolis	1	1	0	0	3
- Source: Whiticker/Hudson

Alfred Dobbs (1878−1954) was a pioneer Australian rugby league footballer from the 1900s.

Alf ‘Bullock’ Dobbs was a rugby union convert who played with Balmain and Glebe in the amateur game before talking part in the NSW rebel series against the NZ ‘All Golds’ in 1907. Dobbs played for Balmain in the inaugural season of rugby league and although he did not take part in any of the infant code's representative matches that year he was a late inclusion (along with Jim Abercrombie) on the pioneer 1908-09 Kangaroo Tour. The hardy forward appeared in just five matches on the ground-breaking tour and retired from the game in 1909.

Alf Dobbs died on 23 June 1954.
