= Eric Watkins (rugby) =

New Zealand rugby union and rugby league footballer (1880–1949)

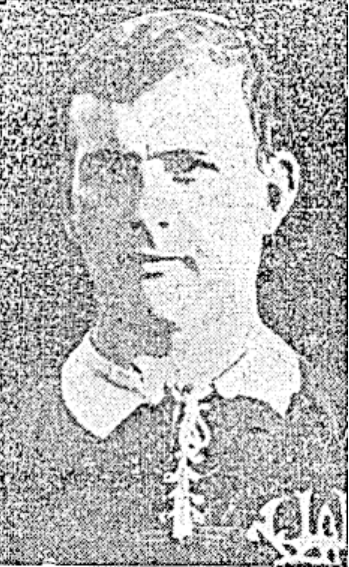

Personal information
- Full name: Eric Leslie Watkins
- Born: 18 March 1880; Akaroa, New Zealand
- Died: 14 August 1949 (aged 68); Lower Hutt, New Zealand

Playing information
- Height: 5 ft 10 in (1.78 m)
- Weight: 13 st 5 lb (85 kg)

Rugby union
- Position: Hooker
Club
| Years | Team | Pld | T | G | FG | P |
|---|---|---|---|---|---|---|
| 1900–06 | Wellington | 40 |
| 1907 | Wanganui |
| | Total | 40 | 0 | 0 | 0 | 0 |
Representative
| Years | Team | Pld | T | G | FG | P |
| 1905 | New Zealand | 2 (1) | 0 | 0 | 0 | 0 |

Rugby league
- Position: Hooker
Representative
| Years | Team | Pld | T | G | FG | P |
|---|---|---|---|---|---|---|
| 1907–08 | New Zealand | 1 | 0 | 0 | 0 | 0 |

Eric L. Watkins (born 18 March 1880 - 14 August 1949) was a New Zealand rugby footballer who represented New Zealand in both rugby union and rugby league.

== Early years ==
Watkins attended Wellington College and was a surveyor by profession. This job often took him around the country.

== Rugby Football ==
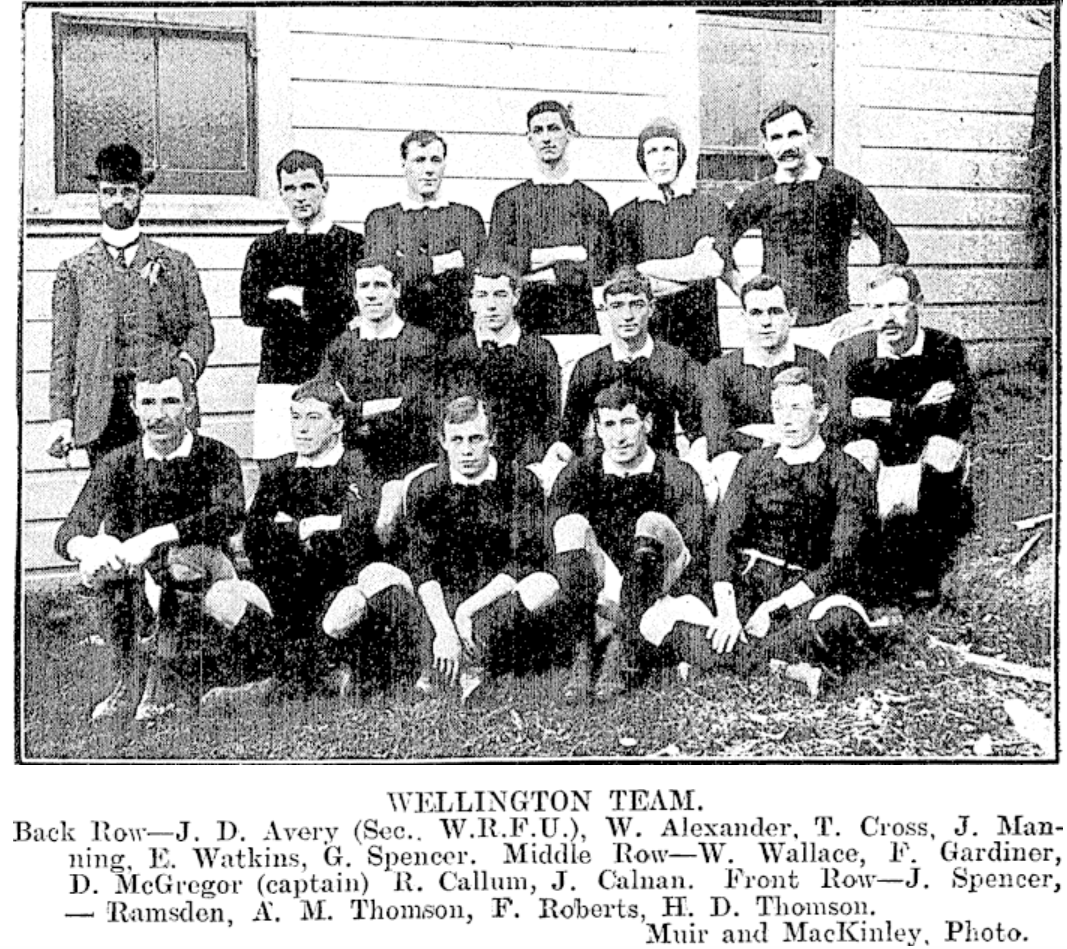
The Wellington team to play Wairarapa in 1906.

Watkins started playing rugby union for the Wellington College Old Boys' Club. He represented Wellington from 1900 to 1906 and the North Island in 1904 and 1906. Watkins was part of the Wellington sides that both won the Ranfurly Shield in 1904 and lost it in 1905. In 1907, when his work took him north to Raetihi, Watkins played in the local competition and represented Wanganui.

Watkins was selected for the All Blacks in 1905 for a test match against Australia. The match occurred while "The Originals" were in transit to Great Britain and thus unavailable for selection but was still given test match status by the New Zealand Rugby Union.

== Rugby League ==
In 1907 Watkins joined the professional All Blacks in their tour of Great Britain and Australia. Like all other members of the touring party, Watkins received a life ban from the New Zealand Rugby Union. Watkins suffered a serious injury while training and did not play in Britain. While in Australia Watkins played in one test match.

Like five other members of the touring party Watkins is buried at Karori Cemetery.
