= Asa Robinson =

GB & England international rugby league footballer & WW1 MM recipient

Personal information
- Full name: Asa Robinson
- Born: 1883 Northowram, Yorkshire, England
- Died: 8 December 1924 (aged 40) Halifax, Yorkshire, England

Playing information
- Height: 6 ft 2 in (1.88 m)
- Weight: 15 st 0 lb (95 kg)
- Position: Forward
Club
Years	Team	Pld	T	G	FG	P
1904–23	Halifax	348	38	14	0	142
Representative
Years	Team	Pld	T	G	FG	P
	Yorkshire	4
1908–09	England	6	1	0	0	3
1908–09	Great Britain	3	3	0	0	9

Asa Robinson MM (1883 – 8 December 1924) was an English professional rugby league footballer who played in the 1900s, 1910s and 1920s. He played at representative level for Great Britain, England and Yorkshire, and at club level for Halifax, as a forward.

== Biography ==
Robinson was born in Northowram, Yorkshire. Standing 6'2", his expansive reach earned him the nickname "The Octopus." During the First World War, he served as a gunner with the Royal Garrison Artillery in France and was awarded the Military Medal.

He remained in Yorkshire and was a frequent site at Thrum Hall, where he was one of the most popular players of his era. He died at age 40 some time after undergoing an operation for an internal health complaint.

== Playing career ==
=== International honours ===
Asa Robinson won caps for England while at Halifax in 1908 against Wales (2 matches), and New Zealand, in 1909 against Australia (3 matches), and won caps for Great Britain while at Halifax in 1908 against New Zealand, and in 1908-09 against Australia (2 matches).

=== County Honours ===
Asa Robinson won caps for Yorkshire while at Halifax.

=== Testimonial match ===
A testimonial match at Halifax was shared by Joe Riley, and Asa Robinson at Thrum Hall, Halifax in 1920, 20,000 people attended the match.

== Honoured at Halifax ==
Asa Robinson is a Halifax Hall Of Fame Inductee.
