= George Tyson (1900s rugby league) =

GB & England international rugby league footballer

Personal information
- Full name: George Frederick Tyson
- Born: c. 1880 Oldham, Lancashire, England
- Died: 21 May 1937 (aged 57) Oldham, Lancashire, England

Playing information
- Position: Wing, Centre
Club
Years	Team	Pld	T	G	FG	P
1902–12	Oldham	246	111	4		341
Representative
Years	Team	Pld	T	G	FG	P
1908–09	England	4	2	0	0	6
1908–09	Great Britain	4	3	0	0	9

George Frederick Tyson (c. 1880 – 21 May 1937) was an English professional rugby league footballer who played in the 1900s and 1910s. He played at representative level for Great Britain and England, and at club level for Oldham, as a wing.

== Playing career ==
=== International honours ===
Tyson won caps for England while at Oldham in 1908 against Wales, in 1909 against Australia (2 matches), and Wales, and won caps for Great Britain while at Oldham in 1908 against New Zealand, and in 1908-09 against Australia (3 matches).

=== Championship appearances ===
George Tyson played in Oldham's victory in the Championship during the 1904–05 season.

George Tyson played on the wing in Oldham's 3-7 defeat by Wigan in the Championship Final during the 1908–09 season at the Willows, Salford on Saturday 1 May 1909.

=== Challenge Cup Final appearances ===
George Tyson played on the wing in Oldham's 3-17 defeat by Warrington in the 1907 Challenge Cup Final during the 1906–07 season at Wheater's Field, Broughton, Salford on Saturday 27 April 1907, in front of a crowd of 18,500.

=== County Cup Final appearances ===
George Tyson played on the wing in Oldham's 9-10 defeat by Wigan in the 1908 Lancashire Cup Final during the 1908–09 season at Wheater's Field, Broughton, Salford on Saturday 19 December 1908.

=== Club career ===
George Tyson was considered a "Probable" for the 1910 Great Britain Lions tour of Australia and New Zealand, but decided not to take part in the tour due to "business reasons".
