= Bill Noble =

Australia international rugby league footballer

Personal information
- Full name: William Stephen Noble
- Born: 13 July 1884 Goulburn, New South Wales, Australia
- Died: 28 November 1937 (aged 53) Brisbane, Queensland, Australia

Playing information

Rugby union
- Position: ?
Club
| Years | Team | Pld | T | G | FG | P |
|---|---|---|---|---|---|---|
| | Marrickville |
| | Newtown |
| | Total | 0 | 0 | 0 | 0 | 0 |

Rugby league
- Position: Forward
Club
| Years | Team | Pld | T | G | FG | P |
|---|---|---|---|---|---|---|
| 1908–12 | Newtown | 48 | 10 | 0 | 0 | 30 |
| 1913 | Balmain | 14 | 0 | 0 | 0 | 0 |
| | Total | 62 | 10 | 0 | 0 | 30 |
Representative
| Years | Team | Pld | T | G | FG | P |
| 1909–12 | Australia | 7 | 0 | 0 | 0 | 0 |
| 1908–13 | New South Wales | 21 | 3 | 0 | 0 | 9 |
| 1908–13 | Metropolis | 3 | 0 | 0 | 0 | 0 |
- Source: As of 24 June 2019

Bill Noble (1884–1937) was a pioneer Australian international representative rugby league footballer. He played club football in the New South Wales Rugby Football League premiership's first season with Newtown in 1908. In 1909 he was also selected to play for Australia, making his full international debut against New Zealand in 1910. He went on to play in the first ever test match against Great Britain on Australian soil during the 1910 Great Britain Lions tour of Australia and New Zealand, he also represented Australasia. Noble was also selected for the 1911–12 Kangaroo tour of Great Britain, playing in two tests and 19 tour matches. He joined the Balmain Tigers as captain for his final season in 1913. Noble was awarded Life Membership of the New South Wales Rugby League in 1914.

Noble moved to Queensland after his playing days were over, and was the general manager of the Golden Casket lotteries, until his death in 1937. He was buried at South Brisbane Cemetery on 29 November 1937.
