= Harry Gifford (rugby league) =

English rugby league footballer (1884–1952)

Personal information
- Full name: Henry Gifford
- Born: 1884 Kirkby-in-Furness, England
- Died: 1 January 1952 (aged 67) Ulverston, England

Playing information
- Position: Fullback
Club
Years	Team	Pld	T	G	FG	P
1901–22	Barrow	420	74	151		524
Representative
Years	Team	Pld	T	G	FG	P
1906–10	Lancashire	9
1908–09	England	4	0	0	0	0
1908–09	Great Britain	2	0	0	0	0

Henry "Harry" Gifford (1884 – 1952) was an English professional rugby league footballer who played in the 1900s, 1910s and 1920s. He played at representative level for Great Britain, England and Lancashire, and at club level for Ulverston Hornets, and Barrow. His preferred position was at fullback.

== Background ==
Harry Gifford was born in Kirkby-in-Furness, Lancashire, England, and his death aged 67 was registered in Ulverston district, Lancashire, England.

== Playing career ==
=== Club career ===
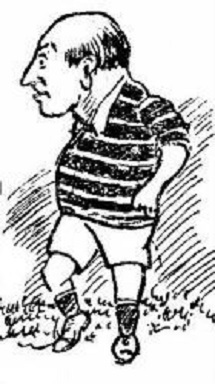
Caricature featuring Harry Gifford

Harry Gifford was transferred from Ulverston Hornets to Barrow during August 1901 for one guinea, i.e. one pound, and one shilling (based on increases in average earnings, this would be approximately £400.10 in 2017), he played his last match for Barrow in the 4–52 defeat by Wigan at Central Park, Wigan on Saturday 21 October 1922.

=== Representative honours ===
Harry Gifford won caps for England while at Barrow in 1908 against Wales, in 1909 against Australia (3 matches), and won caps for Great Britain while at Barrow in 1908–9 against Australia (2 matches).

Harry Gifford won caps for Lancashire while at Barrow.

== Honoured at Barrow Raiders ==
Harry Gifford is a Barrow Raiders Hall of Fame inductee, his commemorative plaque is displayed in the Barrow Raiders boardroom.
