= Alex Burdon =

Australia dual-code international rugby player

- Burdon in 1932
- Born: Alexander Burdon; 31 March 1879 Glebe, New South Wales
- Died: 13 December 1943 (aged 64) Branxton, New South Wales

Rugby union career
- Position: prop
Amateur team(s)
Years	Team	Apps	(Points)
1902-04	Glebe RUFC		
1905-07	Sydney RUFC		
Provincial / State sides
Years	Team	Apps	(Points)
1903	Metropolis (Sydney)		
1903-07	New South Wales		
International career
Years	Team	Apps	(Points)
1903-07	Australia	4	(3)
- Rugby league career

Playing information
- Position: Forward
Club
Years	Team	Pld	T	G	FG	P
1908–10	Glebe Dirty Reds	20				9
Representative
Years	Team	Pld	T	G	FG	P
1908–09	Australia	2				0

Alexander Burdon (31 March 1879 – 13 December 1943) was an Australian rugby union and pioneer professional rugby league footballer - a dual-code rugby international.

He was one of the founding fathers of rugby league in Australia, representing the Kangaroos in the first two Tests played in 1908 and 1909. He was the fourth captain of the Australian team enjoying that honour in the deciding Test of the inaugural tour.

== Rugby union career ==
Born in Glebe, New South Wales he played first grade for the district from 1902 and the following year represented Sydney, then New South Wales. He made his Australian representative test debut as prop, against the All Blacks in the 22–3 victory in Sydney, on 15 August 1903.

In 1904 he represented against England then toured New Zealand in 1905.

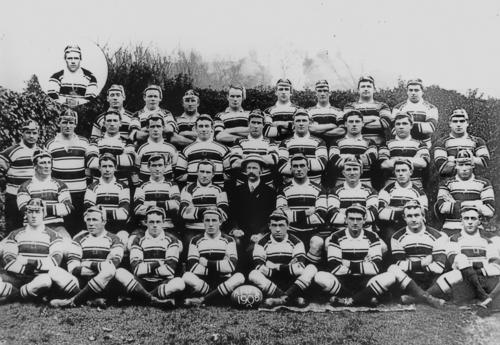
Burdon (back row, 2nd from left) Pioneer Kangaroos 1908-09

Folklore would suggest that Burdon's injury on the 1907 New South Wales Rugby tour of Queensland and the resultant unfairness of him having to pay his medical expenses while suffering a loss of wages, was a catalyst leading to the 1907 split away from rugby union. Similar sentiments in the north of England for working-class players who could not afford time off due to injury had indeed prompted the changes that formed the new "Northern Union" two years earlier. However the movement to start a rugby league competition in Sydney was already well under way before Burdon's injury.

== Rugby league career ==
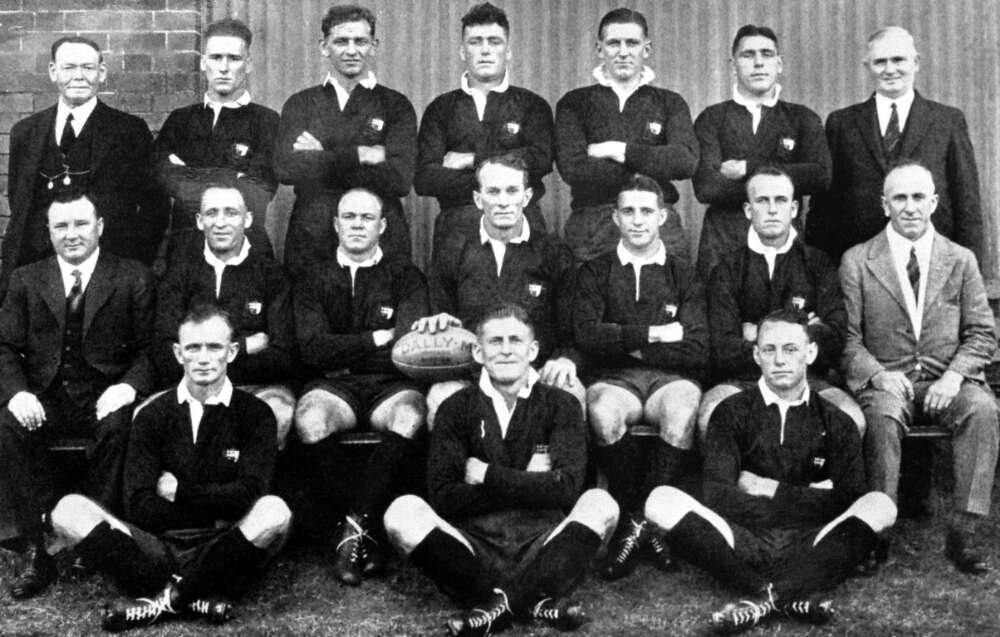
Australian Test side v England 1932, Burdon (official) standing left

Burdon joined the newly formed Glebe Rugby League Club in 1908 and was named the club's foundation captain.

He was one of the five selectors for the Pioneer Kangaroo tour of England. He played in 25 tour matches including the first and second Anglo-Australian Test matches. Eight former Wallabies had debuted for the Kangaroos in the Matches against New Zealand earlier that year, Burdon's league Test debut in the first Test against England with Pat Walsh made them the 9th and 10th Australian dual code internationals.He is listed on the Australian Players Register as Kangaroo No. 29.

In The First Kangaroos, a 1988 British–Australian made for TV sports film, Bluey Burdon's role was played by Philip Quast.

== Playing record ==
- Club: Glebe Rugby League Club1908-10 20 games, 3 tries
- Representative: Australia (1908–09) 2 Tests.

== Sources ==
- Whiticker, Alan (2004) Captaining the Kangaroos, New Holland, Sydney

Preceded by Denis Lutge	Australian national rugby league captain 1909	Succeeded by Dally Messenger
