= Jim Abercrombie =

Australian rugby union and rugby league footballer (1880–1948)

Personal information
- Born: 31 December 1880 Curramulka, South Australia, Australia
- Died: 29 October 1948 (aged 67) Tākaka, New Zealand

Playing information
- Position: Lock
Club
| Years | Team | Pld | T | G | FG | P |
|---|---|---|---|---|---|---|
| 1908–13 | Western Suburbs | 14 | 0 | 5 | 0 | 10 |
Representative
| Years | Team | Pld | T | G | FG | P |
| 1908–09 | Australia | 2 | 0 | 0 | 0 | 0 |
| 1907–08 | New South Wales | 2 | 0 | 0 | 0 | 0 |
| 1908 | Metropolis | 2 | 0 | 0 | 0 | 0 |
- Source: As of 19 June 2019

James Maskell Abercrombie (born James Maskell; 31 December 1880 – 29 October 1948) was an Australian rugby league footballer who played for Western Suburbs in the New South Wales Rugby League premiership competition. He also played rugby union for North Sydney and Glebe. His position of choice was at lock though his versatility meant he could play anywhere in the forwards and he often goal kicked.

== Family ==
Abercrombie was born as James Maskell on New Year's Eve 1880 in Curramulka, South Australia. His parents were Thomas Meskel and Lucy Hickman. The family changed their name to Maskell Abercrombie before Jim's marriage in 1906 to Grace Johnson, and his son was baptised in 1907 as William Joseph Maskell Abercrombie.

== Career ==
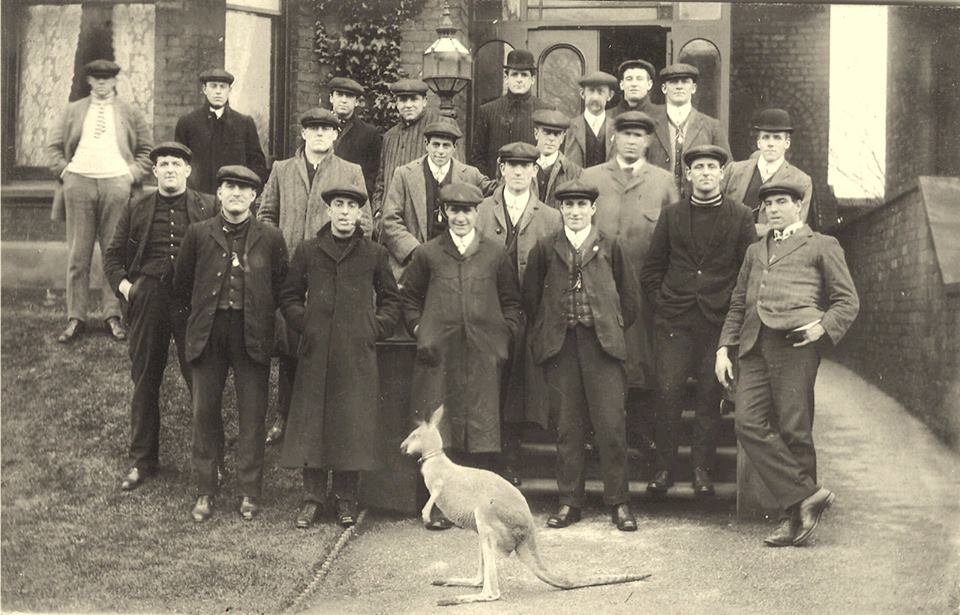
Abercrombie front far left with a group of the 1908 Kangaroos

Abercrombie originally played rugby union prior to the formation of the New South Wales Rugby League premiership in 1908 and was one of the original players to make the switch to the newly formed code. He attended the founding meeting of the Western Suburbs rugby league club and was elected to the inaugural committee. Abercrombie played in Wests' very first match against Balmain and scored Wests' very first goals in 1st grade in the following match against Souths. He played all nine matches of the inaugural season and was selected the first national representative side that played against the visiting New Zealand All Golds. He was also controversially a member of the 1908–09 Kangaroo tour of Great Britain after he was originally left out of the squad though after a public outcry over his omission he was called in, thus making him the first international player to come from the Western Suburbs club. He played in two Tests and 30 tour matches of the long campaign.

Abercrombie was awarded Life Membership of the New South Wales Rugby League in 1914.

In 2008, the Western Suburbs Magpies celebrated their centenary by inducting six inaugural members into the club's Hall of Fame. These six included Jim Abercrombie.
