= Arthur Anlezark =

Australia dual-code international rugby footballer

- Born: Ernest Arthur Anlezark; 29 December 1882 Bathurst, New South Wales
- Died: 14 May 1961 (aged 78) Crewe, Cheshire
- Occupation: Cotton broker

Rugby union career
- Position: fly-half
Amateur team(s)
Years	Team	Apps	(Points)
1897-08	Bathurst & Lismore		
Provincial / State sides
Years	Team	Apps	(Points)
–	NSW Country		
-	New South Wales		
International career
Years	Team	Apps	(Points)
1905	Australia	1	(0)
- Rugby league career

Playing information
- Position: Five-eighth
Club
Years	Team	Pld	T	G	FG	P
1909–14	Oldham	114				109
Representative
Years	Team	Pld	T	G	FG	P
1908	Queensland
1908	Australia	1

Ernest Arthur "George" Anlezark (29 December 1882 – 14 May 1961), also known as Alec, was an Australian rugby league and rugby union player – a dual-code rugby international.He was a pioneer Australian representative footballer selected in the first Australia national rugby union team overseas touring side to New Zealand in 1905 and representing the Kangaroos in the first Kangaroo tour of Great Britain in 1908.

== Rugby union career ==
Born in Bathurst, New South Wales he was a regular in NSW Country and NSW representative teams before being selected as fly-half in Australia's first rugby union touring team which played a Test against New Zealand in Dunedin on 2 September 1905.

Playing in the country, Anlezark found it difficult to re-gain selection to the Australian representative team in the following year, especially after moving to Lismore for his work with the NSW Railways.

== Rugby league career ==
Anlezark arrived in Brisbane in 1908 and first played rugby league for Queensland Maroons against a touring New Zealand Maori team. He then played against New South Wales in the first ever interstate fixture before being chosen for Australia in the inaugural international game against the New Zealand Māori.

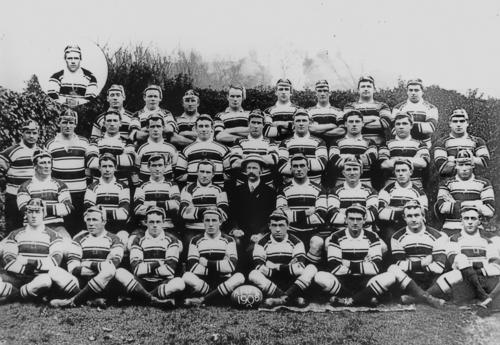
Anlezark (inset) with the Pioneer Kangaroos 1908–09

He was selected in the pioneer Kangaroo touring side of 1908 and playing at half-back alongside Dally Messenger. Two months later in the 3rd Test against England which Australia lost 6–5, Anlezark made his début Kangaroo Test appearance becoming at that point the 10th ever dual rugby-code Australian international. He captained Australia in the final four tour games of the trip. Anlezark is listed on the Australian Players Register as Kangaroo No. 23.

Having been selected for Queensland on the strength of his rugby union credentials, Anlezark made appearances for Queensland, an Australian touring side and an Australian Test side before he had ever played a club game. The Brisbane club competition did not begin until 1909.

Anlezark remained in England to play for Oldham and made 114 appearances in six seasons up till commencement of World War I. He was part of Oldham's Club Championship, Lancashire League and Lancashire Cup wins from 1909 to 1912. At the end of the 1908–09 Northern Rugby Football Union season Anlezark played at scrum half back in Oldham's loss to Wigan in the Championship Final. He also played in the 1912 Challenge Cup Final where Oldham were beaten 8–5 in a shock upset by Dewsbury.

== After football ==
In 1914 Anlezark enlisted in the British Army and was assigned to the 66th Brigade Divisional Artillery. He saw active service against the Ottoman Empire during the Mesopotamian campaign. After the War Anlezark returned to Oldham to become a cotton broker and investor on the Manchester stock exchange, but was bankrupted in a market crash in 1925. He remained in the U.K. for the rest of his life. He died at Crewe, England in 1961, aged 78.
