= John Rosewell =

Australia dual-code rugby international footballer and RL coach

Johnny Rosewell
- Born: John Solomon Hargraves Rosewell; 1 July 1882 Sydney, New South Wales, Australia
- Died: 20 November 1931 (aged 49) Maroubra, New South Wales, Australia

Rugby union career
- Position: prop
Amateur team(s)
Years	Team	Apps	(Points)
- South Sydney RUFC
Provincial / State sides
Years	Team	Apps	(Points)
1907	New South Wales	2	
International career
Years	Team	Apps	(Points)
1907	Australia	2	(0)
- Rugby league career

Playing information
- Position: Second-row
Club
Years	Team	Pld	T	G	FG	P
1908–10	South Sydney	29				24
1911–12	Annandale	10				0
	Total	39	0	0	0	24
Representative
Years	Team	Pld	T	G	FG	P
1908	New South Wales	2				0
1908	Australia	1				0

Coaching information
Representative
Years	Team	Gms	W	D	L	W%
1913	South Sydney

John S. H. Rosewell (1 July 1882 – 20 November 1931) was an Australian rugby union and pioneer professional rugby league footballer and represented his country at both sports – a dual-code international.

== Rugby union career ==
His rugby union career was played with the South Sydney RUFC. Rosewell was 28 years of age before he first saw representative success making four appearances in 1907 against the All Blacks, two for New South Wales and two as a Wallaby.

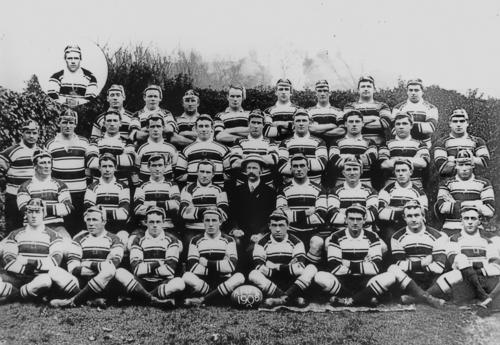
Rosewell (3rd row far left) Pioneer Kangaroos 1908–09

== Rugby league career ==
He joined the new rugby league code in its first year – 1908, starting with the South Sydney Rabbitohs. Along with Dally Messenger, Denis Lutge, Doug McLean snr and Micky Dore he was one of the inaugural five Australian dual code rugby internationals who having earlier represented at rugby union, debuted in international rugby league in Sydney on 9 May 1908 in the first ever Australian league Test against New Zealand. He is listed on the Australian Players Register as Kangaroo No.13.

He spent three seasons at South Sydney playing 29 matches scoring 4 tries and 6 goals. He was a member of the 1910 Rabbitohs side that drew the Grand Final against Newtown but lost the premiership on countback.

He was selected on the pioneer 1908 Kangaroo tour of Great Britain and played one tour match. For the 1911 and 1912 seasons he saw out his playing career with the Annandale club.

In 1913 he was the first grade coach of the Rabbitohs.

== Death ==
After his retirement from football, Johnny Rosewell worked at the RAS Showground until his death. He died suddenly at his Maroubra home on 20 November 1931, and was buried the following day at Botany Cemetery.

== Sources ==
- Whiticker, Alan (2004) Captaining the Kangaroos, New Holland, Sydney
- Andrews, Malcolm (2006) The ABC of Rugby League, Austn Broadcasting Corpn, Sydney
