= 1907–08 New Zealand rugby tour of Australia and Great Britain =

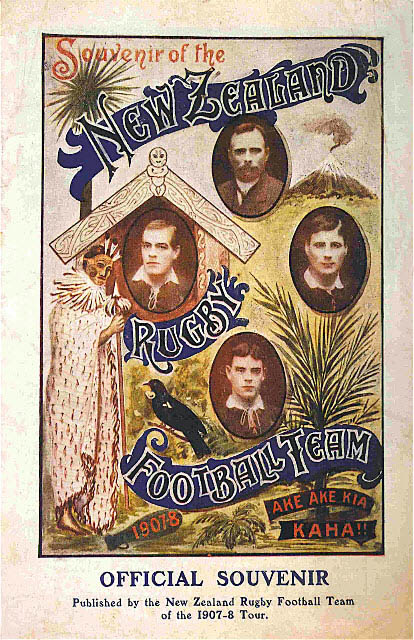
Souvenir of the New Zealand Rugby Football Team as published in 1907

The 1907–1908 New Zealand rugby tour of Australia and Great Britain was made by a group of New Zealand rugby footballers who played matches in Australia, Ceylon, England and Wales between 1907 and 1908. Most of the matches were played under the rules of the Northern Union, a sport that is today known as rugby league. As such, the team were the immediate predecessors of the New Zealand national rugby league team. The tour had a large role in establishing rugby league in both Australia and New Zealand, and also gave birth to international rugby league. The tour party has come to be known as the professional All Blacks or All Golds, although at the time they were commonly referred to as the All Blacks—a named popularised by the New Zealand rugby union team that toured the Northern Hemisphere in 1905.

The idea for a professional rugby tour was conceived by Albert Baskiville, a player from the Wellington region of New Zealand. Baskiville managed to recruit a significant number of international and provincial representatives for the team; including George Smith who toured with the All Blacks team of 1905. The team played their first match in Sydney in 1907 against New South Wales. The success of the team's three matches in Sydney prompted the formation of the New South Wales Rugby League, and also saw them recruit Australian Dally Messenger for their tour of Wales and England. After stopping over in Ceylon, the team arrived in England on 30 September 1907. The team played 35 matches in England and Wales, including a Test match against Wales, and three Tests against England. They returned via Australia where they played a further ten matches, including three Test matches against Australia. They won a total of 26 of their 46 matches.

The tour firmly established rugby league in both New Zealand and Australia, and was commemorated by a centenary tour in 2007—the 2007 All Golds Tour.

== Background ==
Rugby union had established itself as the national winter game in New Zealand even before the 1905 tour of The Original All Blacks. This tour was a success both on the field and commercially off the field, with the New Zealand Rugby Union making a profit of £12,000. However, in New Zealand some discontent about the state of rugby union's rules and the lack of ability to compensate players for time lost from work were beginning to rise. These tensions were similar to the ones that had led to the 1895 schism in England that had created the Northern Union. In addition the Originals were only paid 3/- a day expenses while on tour, a token amount when the Rugby Union was making such a profit.

== Tour preparations ==
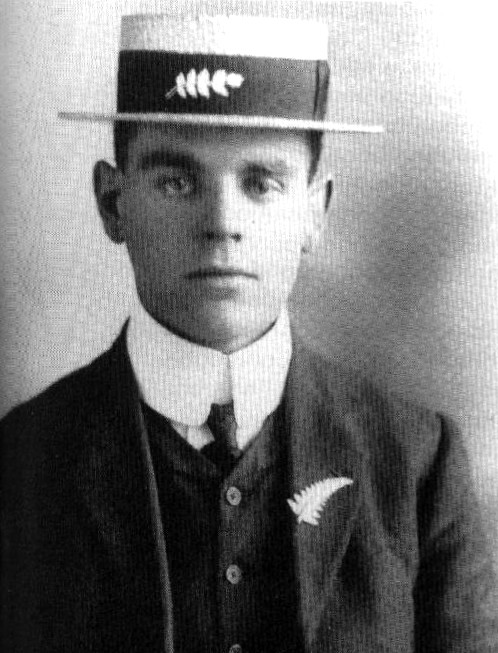
Tour organiser, sportswriter and footballer Albert Henry Baskiville

Albert Baskiville was well known in rugby circles, playing for the Oriental club and on the verge of Wellington provincial selection. He had also in 1907 published a book entitled Modern Rugby Football: New Zealand Methods which explained how to play the game and was widely read. He was inspired to launch a tour to play the clubs in the Northern Union by an article in the Daily Mail written by F W Cooper. The article, written by a Northern Union advocate, said that while the Originals tour had been successful it was a shame that they had not played any of the northern clubs, which at the time of the 1895 break away were regarded as some of the strongest clubs in England. Baskiville had conversations with several prominent rugby players, including the famous Original George William Smith who had talked to Northern Union officials and J J Giltinan about starting the code in Sydney. Smith's role in starting the game in Australasia was crucial as he had a wide set of connections and was a well known sporting celebrity, being an Original, a world class sprinter and a champion jockey.

In early 1907 Baskiville wrote to the Northern Rugby Football Union (NRFU) asking if they would wish to host a tour of a New Zealand rugby team. As the North of England had not had any international rugby since the tour of the 1888-1889 New Zealand Native football team, the NRFU was enthusiastic. On 26 March 1907 it advised its member clubs that it was "very favourably disposed" to the tour and suggested that the tourists be paid 70% of the gates with a guarantee of £3000. The Northern Union informed Baskiville that the tour should go ahead and by May plans were firmly underway in New Zealand. Baskiville then resigned his job at the New Zealand Post Office to plan the tour full-time.

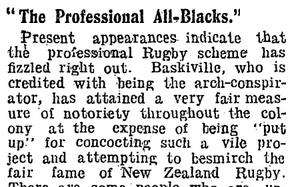
Excerpt of an article from 1 June 1907 NZ Truth. Baskiville's plans were conveyed unfavourably in the New Zealand press.

News of the tour was first publicly broken by the New Zealand Herald which ran a story on 13 May 1907 about a possible professional rugby tour. It was extraordinary the level of secrecy that the New Zealand organisers had achieved, with the news being broken via England. Opposition to the tour was vocal with the New Zealand Rugby Union condemning the tour and the media being generally supportive of the amateur game and its ideals of amateurism. However, as the co-operative nature of the tour became more widely known the touring party gained some public sympathy and the Rugby Union appeared to be increasingly the one out of touch with public opinion.

Baskiville assembled a team of selectors; Duncan McGregor, Massa Johnston, Hercules Richard Wright and George William Smith, and they began to think about the type of players they wished to bring on the tour. Knowing the rule changes that the Northern Union had made to their game the selectors knew line-out specialists would not be required and decided to favour players with ample amounts of speed and acceleration. They also needed players that were prepared to invest some money into the venture and probably accept a lifetime ban from rugby union. In the end no less than 160 of the roughly 200 rugby union players involved in provincial rugby in New Zealand applied to go on the tour, a huge blow to the Rugby Union who had anticipated a low amount of interest. It was from these applications that the final team was selected, with players who had indicated early they were prepared to tour being favoured. At least two rugby union internationals did not tour, "Opai" Asher declined due to a broken ankle and George A. Gillett had to pull out at short notice due to injury. Both were to switch to rugby league later on in their careers. In the end the tour included nine internationals and fourteen provincial players, a large number selected from the Wellington and Auckland teams that had recently been battling over the Ranfurly Shield.

== 1907 in Australia ==
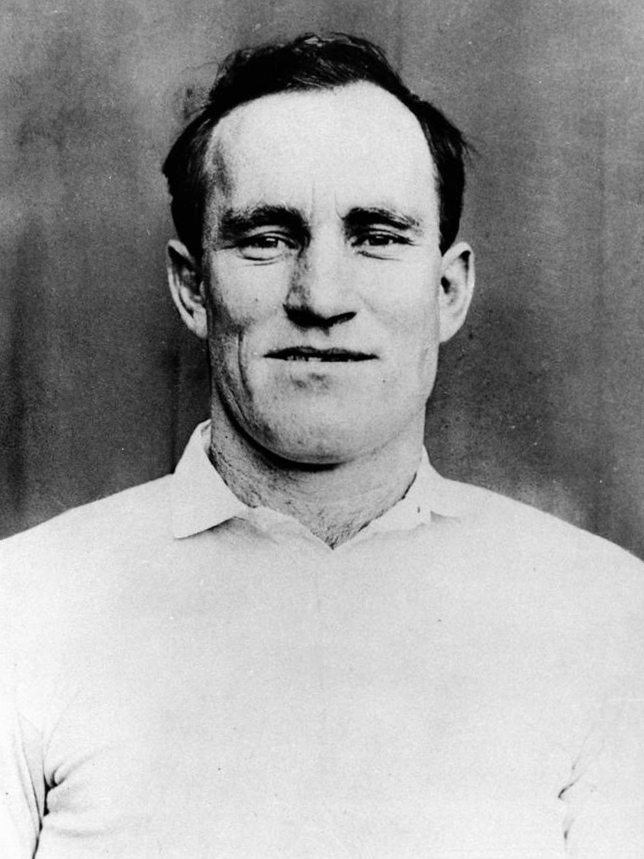
Messenger played against the All Blacks in Sydney and then joined them on their tour of Great Britain

With the tour plans well underway George Smith contacted Peter Moir, a prominent Sydney player, asking if it would be possible to arrange a set of games in Sydney. Moir contacted others including J J Giltinan, who Smith had already talked to, before replying that a series of games would be able to be arranged. Rugby players in Sydney shared many of the New Zealand players' concerns about payment and rules. On 8 August 1907 the New South Wales Rugby League was formed. The New South Welshmen organised quickly and were ready to welcome the New Zealanders when the main touring party arrived on 13 August 1907. The New South Wales rugby union side had defeated the New Zealand rugby union team 14–0 in their second of two matches in 1907 and so were expected to be tough opponents, especially as the professional All Blacks had yet to form combinations and several of the Auckland-based players had not yet arrived in Sydney.

The first game was played on the Royal Agricultural Society Ground to a sold-out crowd of 20,000. Played under rugby union rules, the visitors led 6–0 at halftime and closed out the match, winning 12–8. The stars of the first game were Richard Wynyard for New Zealand and Dally Messenger for the New South Wales side. The game was deemed to be a great success, as the organisers had not expected a crowd over 12,000.

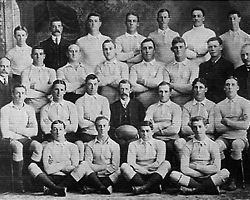
The New South Wales team who played the All Golds in Sydney

The second game, a mid-week game, was held in front of a crowd of approximately 3,000. The All Blacks, who had made several changes, defeated the "All Blues" 19–5.

The New Zealanders then won the third match of the series 5–3 in front of a crowd of 8,000 at the Agricultural Ground. Dally Messenger, playing his first game as captain, again starred and was invited to join the touring party.

It is unclear when the decision to invite Messenger was made, with some reports saying that he was recommended to Baskiville in New Zealand by George Gillett when he had to withdraw from the touring party due to injury. Messenger's name was included on the contract bought over from New Zealand, indicating that the decision had already been made. However, Messenger's form against the All Blacks in Sydney was certainly good enough to warrant his inclusion in the touring party. A fourth match had originally been planned in Melbourne, as an attempt to foster rugby in the city, but the plans fell through for unknown reasons. Instead the All Blacks left Australia, having earned £600 from the three games. During their short stay the tourists had helped kick-start the professional movement in Sydney. While leaving Australia news came through that the New Zealand Rugby Union had issued life bans to all of those involved in the tour.

The financial success of the All Golds' games in Sydney gave valuable momentum to Giltinan and Co.'s scheme to introduce a professional district rugby football competition in Sydney the following season.

== 1907–08 in England and Wales ==
While on the long sea voyage from Australia, the men tried to keep fit by training on the deck. During a stop over in Ceylon the team was challenged to a game by the Ceylon rugby union. The All Blacks won the match against Ceylon 33–8. As a result of this match the rugby union New Zealand side declined to play the Ceylonese on the return leg of their tour, deeming that Ceylon had forfeited their amateur status by playing against Baskerville's men.

During the voyage the tourists also played a game of cricket against the ships officers and first class passengers and were again victorious, winning by an innings. McGregor and Messenger proved to be the best bowlers in the touring party.

The arrival of the team was met with great anticipation in the Yorkshire and Lancashire, areas that had been devoid of international competition for so long. The exciting play of the 1905 Originals and the reports that the current side had won three matches in Australia only heightened the expectations of the hosts. The RMS Ortona, carrying the touring side, berthed in Marseille, France and the squad took a train to Boulogne before they boarded the Empress. They reached England on 30 September 1907, arriving in Folkestone. The visitors were met by the main officials of the Northern Rugby Football Union. The team stayed the night in London, where the Northern Union officials introduced the side to the press – near the headquarters of the English Rugby Union. The next day the side travelled north to Leeds where they were met at the station by a crowd of about 6,000, all keen to see the touring All Blacks. After they had arrived the tourists had two weeks before their first game. They spent the time based in Leeds, training and adapting to both the new rules of the Northern Union and the colder climate. They also watched Leeds and Hunslet play a local derby game – the first time they had seen the new rules in operation.

The first game was held on 9 October 1907 against Bramley. Around 8,000 spectators packed McLaren Field in Bramley to see the All Blacks win 25–6 in their first game under the Northern Union rules. In their second game against Huddersfield the tourists, keen for as many players as possible to get a run, selected a team mostly made up of players who were not involved in the first match. They still managed to defeat Huddersfield, winning 19–8 with Lance Todd playing a key role in the game played before a crowd of over 10,000. After the first two matches the touring side met with the Northern Union and discussed the first two games; they also received their first payment – a cheque for £448–15–6. The tour then moved on to Lancashire where the team played Widnes at Naughton Park before a new ground record crowd, resulting in a 26–11 victory. Just two days later the visitors met the Broughton Rangers, who were at the time a powerhouse of the Northern Union. Regarded as the All Blacks' "first big test" the match was played in front of a large crowd of 24,000. New Zealand took an early lead in the game and, despite a spirited Broughton comeback in a torrential downpour, held out to win 20–14.

The All Blacks next travelled to Wakefield to play Wakefield Trinity. The tourists rested several key players for this game and badly underestimated their opponents. New Zealand fell behind early and only managed to salvage a 5-all draw. Stung by the result, the All Blacks decided to select their best team to take on Leeds. They went on to win 8–2, despite winning only one out of every five scrums. After this match the tourists received their second cheque, this one for £1036-10-8, and it was already clear that the tour was going to record a healthy profit. During this second meeting with the Northern Union the visitors requested that two more test matches be added to the itinerary, turning it into a three-match test series. For the other two matches the Northern Union first contacted the Crystal Palace Football Club. However negotiations fell through and the second test was instead scheduled to take place at Chelsea Football Club's Stamford Bridge. The third match was scheduled for Whaddon Road in Cheltenham, the same ground that the amateur All Blacks had played on several years earlier. For the Northern Union this series of matches represented a chance to expand their game into areas of England dominated by rugby union and association football. Also at this time the New Zealand team, with an increasing list of injuries, moved their base from Leeds to Ilkley, a spa town in Yorkshire.

The tour's next match was in St. Helens where the team visited the birthplace of Richard Seddon before playing St. Helens, winning 24–5. The All Blacks then moved on to Wales to play Merthyr Tydfil, the club having only recently converted to the Northern Union code. The side won 27–9 and then returned to Ilkley with a number of injuries. Their next match was against Keighley, one of the top teams in the league, on Guy Fawkes Day and Smith, Messenger, Billy Wynyard, Cross and Gilchrist were all unavailable. 8,000 supporters turned up to the match, Keighley's biggest gate at the time, and Keighley led at half time. However the All Blacks fought back and won the match 9–7 to remain unbeaten after two months of football.

The next game was against Wigan, already by this time one of the giants of the game. A massive crowd of 30,000 supporters packed in to see their local side take on the New Zealanders. The tourists fielded the strongest side they were able to, although several players were missing or playing out of position due to injuries. Despite playing well the All Blacks went down 12–8 to Wigan to record their first loss on the tour after fourteen matches. The tourists' next game was against Barrow, their first game in Cumberland. The team arrived in Barrow late, having had a train be delayed, and the weather was poor. Barrow were able to frustrate New Zealand, who could not play open football in the weather, and the All Blacks suffered their second loss in a row, going down 6–3. They next had to travel to Kingston upon Hull where they took on the Hull F.C. The game was a higher scoring affair and the visitors were able to come out winners, 18–13. For their next game, against Leigh, the weather was again poor and the All Blacks were again beaten in the rain, losing 15–9. They lost again in their next match, as 15,000 spectators watched Oldham win 8–7 in drenching rain and, in the second half, a snowstorm. By now it was established that in good weather the visiting side were able to beat anybody, however in the wet weather their backs were not able to handle the ball and matches were a much closer affair. During the next Wednesday's game New Zealand were again defeated in the rain, dominated by the Runcorn RFC forwards they lost 9–0. After a string of defeats and poor weather the side's management decided to re-locate and the team was moved to Manchester, seeking slightly better weather.

The touring side next played a combined Dewsbury and Batley side, winning 18–8 in fine conditions, and backed this up by defeating Swinton 11–2 and Rochdale Hornets 19–0. The New Zealanders were then upset by Bradford F.C., who defeated then 7–2 in gale-force winds and driving rain. This was backed up with another loss, going down to Halifax, the League champions, 9–4. The All Blacks' next game was against Yorkshire, the first of their matches against County representative sides. The visitors were ready for this game and defeated the proud rugby county 23–4. New Zealand's next game was against the current Challenge Cup holders, Warrington. Ten thousand spectators watched the Warrington side pip the All Blacks 8–7 despite the visitors being ahead 7–5 at half time. The tourists spent Christmas Day in Manchester before heading to Leeds to take on Hunslet in a boxing day match. New Zealand were ahead 9–0 at halftime and were leading 11–8 in the second half when the home team had a player sent off, the first of the tour. However Hunslet still managed to score and the final result was an 11-all draw. Two days later the tourists played Salford, and won 9–2 in front of 12,000 people.

=== The test matches ===
==== Wales ====
New Year's Day saw the touring party head to Wales for their first international match. Aberdare Athletic Ground was the venue of the first ever rugby league international on 1 January 1908, played between Wales and New Zealand. The New Zealand Rugby League later recognised this match as New Zealand's first test match. Aberdare had been chosen for the venue as it could hold a larger capacity than Merthyr, in the end 20,000 Welshmen turned up. The Welsh side contained a former Welsh amateur international as well as several players who had been playing in the Northern Union for years.

WALES: Chick Jenkins, Dai Thomas, Tom Llewellyn, Bert Jenkins, Llewellyn Treharne, David Beynon, Johnny Thomas, Dai Jones, David Davies, Oliver Burgham, George W. Thomas, Dai Rees, Howell de Francis.

NEW ZEALAND: Hubert Turtill, Dally Messenger, Harold Rowe, Arthur Kelly, William Wynyard, Edgar Wrigley, Richard Wynyard, Massa Johnston, William Mackrell, Dan Gilchrist, Charles Pearce, Angry Cross, Hercules Wright (c).

1 January 1908

Wales	9–8	New Zealand
Tries: Thomas, Francis, Jones		Tries: Kelly, W.Wynyard; Goals: Messenger

Aberdare Athletic Ground, Aberdare
Attendance: 20,000

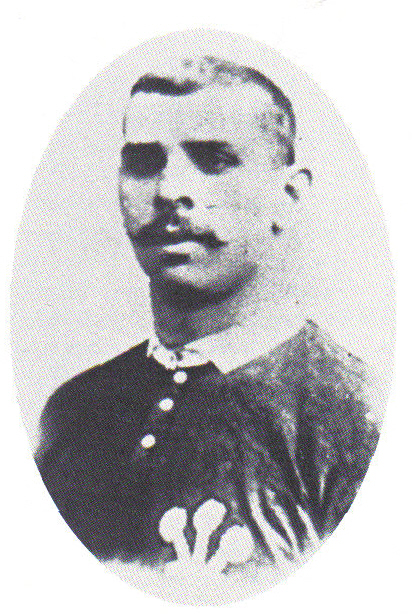
Dai Jones scored the winning try for Wales in the first match of international rugby league

New Zealand led the match 8–3 at halftime but the Welsh came back and Dai Jones scored a try with only minutes to go that put the Welsh 9–8 in front. Dick Wynyard then dropped a pass in front of the try line and the Welsh won the first international rugby league match.

The day after the game the touring party left Wales, heading back to Kingston upon Hull for their second visit, this time to play the Hull Kingston Rovers. The All Blacks somewhat rebounded, winning 6–3 in a tightly fought contest. Reaching the business end of the tour, the New Zealanders next headed north to play the representative Cumberland side. Here they were defeated 21–9 after resting several key players for the international against England.

==== England ====
The tourist next played an England XIII at Central Park in Wigan. 12,000 spectators turned up despite the ground being frozen – necessitating a layer of straw to be placed over the top. The conditions favoured an open game and by half time the score was 11-all. In the end England ran out winners 18–16, meaning the New Zealanders had now lost two internationals. After the match the All Blacks were invited to visit the Duke of Portland's residence and they were pleased to be able to meet the famous New Zealand racing horse Carbine, all of the touring party being given a small lock of the horse's hair as a parting gift.

The tourists now moved their base to Blackpool but their form did not improve, losing to the Lancashire county team 20–4. Going into the three test series against the Northern Union it was clear that they were not full of confidence.

==== Great Britain ====
===== Test one =====
Going into the first test Dally Messenger, Duncan McGregor and Conrad Byrne were all unavailable due to influenza. Great Britain was boosted by England and Wales having both already played New Zealand, the two teams had then played each other to complete the tri-series. The weather too was poor, thick fog blamed for a low crowd, half of the 16,000 that had been predicted.

NORTHERN UNION: Harry Taylor, Andrew Hogg, Tom Llewellyn, Bert Jenkins, Jim Leytham, Jim Jolley, Johnny Thomas, George Ruddick, Dai Jones, Asa Robinson, Arthur Smith, Harry Wilson, Silas Warwick.

NEW ZEALAND: Hubert Turtill, Harold Rowe, George William Smith, Edgar Wrigley, Lance Todd, Richard Wynyard, Arthur Kelly, Angry Cross, Dan Gilchrist, Charles Pearce, Hercules Wright (c), Massa Johnston, William Trevarthen.

25 January 1908

Northern Union	14–6	New Zealand
Tries: Robinson (2), Leytham, Llewellyn; Goals: Jolley		Tries: Turtill, R.Wynyard

Headingley, Leeds
Attendance: 8,182

After thirty minutes it the game was still scoreless, until Jolley finally broke the deadlock with a drop goal. By half time Great Britain was up 8–0. Hubert Turtill scored soon after halftime and then Dick Wynyard missed an opportunity to level the scores after he had taken an intercept at halfway but failed to reach his support. Robinson then scored to put the home side ahead 14–3. Wynyard then scored a late try but it was not enough and the All Blacks were again defeated, losing the first ever test match between New Zealand and Great Britain.

The tourists then lost again, this time going down 5–3 in a mid week game against York. January had not been a good month for the All Blacks with just one win from seven. Leading up to the second test the New Zealanders returned to Wales to play Ebbw Vale on 1 February. Here they finally returned to the winning circle, winning 3–2.

===== Test two =====
The second test was the first time that rugby league had been played in London, and as a result the match was deemed to be important for the Northern Union's chances of expanding into the rest of England.

NORTHERN UNION: Harry Taylor, Percy Eccles, Tom Llewellyn, Bert Jenkins, Jim Leytham, Jim Jolley, Johnnie Baxter, George Ruddick, Dai Jones, Arthur Smith, George Thomas, Harry Wilson, Silas Warwick.

NEW ZEALAND: Hubert Turtill, Dally Messenger, George William Smith (c), Lance Todd, William Tyler, Edgar Wrigley, Richard Wynyard, Massa Johnston, Angry Cross, Charles Pearce, Dan Gilchrist, William Trevarthen, Charles Dunning.

8 February 1908

Northern Union	6–18	New Zealand
Tries: Eccles, Leytham		Tries: Smith, Johnston, Todd, R.Wynyard; Goals: Messenger (3)

Stamford Bridge, London
Attendance: 14,000

In the second test match New Zealand completely outplayed Great Britain, with the home side being held score less until the last five minutes. The tourists' win set up the series at 1-all and the spotlight then moved to Cheltenham, the scene of the third and deciding test match.

===== Test three =====
The morning before the third and final test match was filled with rain. The weather may have contributed to the reduced crowd, although the game was being played in the Midlands in an area that was a stronghold of rugby union. The Great Britain selectors had made a series of changes for the third match and had included Billy Batten, who was making his international debut. In contrast the visitors' team remained unchanged from their win in the second test.

NORTHERN UNION: Harry Taylor, George Tyson, Phil Thomas, Bert Jenkins, Billy Batten, Jim Jolley, Tom White, Jack Spencer, Bill Holder, John Wilkinson Birch, Jim Clampitt, Harry Wilson, Arthur Smith.

NEW ZEALAND: Hubert Turtill, Dally Messenger, George William Smith (c), Lance Todd, William Tyler, Edgar Wrigley, Richard Wynyard, Massa Johnston, Angry Cross, Charles Pearce, Dan Gilchrist, William Trevarthen, Charles Dunning.

15 February 1908

Northern Union	5–8	New Zealand
Tries: Jolley; Goals: White		Tries: Messenger, Jonhston; Goals:Wrigley

Whaddon Road, Cheltenham
Attendance: 4,000

The British began the game on the attack and scored early through a White penalty. Because of the conditions the match developed into a forwards slog. Just before half time Great Britain scored and took a 5–0 lead into the break. However, with the wind at their backs, the New Zealanders dominated the second half. They were held out by the British however until, with just seven minutes to go, the tourists finally scored through Messenger. The try was converted and the score was 5-all. With a few minutes remaining Tom "Angry" Cross was sent off. This seemed to inspire the All Black forwards and they pushed hard in a scrum near the British line, resulting in Massa Johnston crashing over to score the winning try. The New Zealand side therefore had won the first rugby league test series 2–1.

The tourists then returned North for their final game in England, a re-match against St Helens R.F.C. Albert Baskiville played in his first match of the tour, scoring a try as New Zealand won 23–10. The side then prepared to return to New Zealand via Australia, although several players opted to stay behind and sign professional contracts with British clubs. George William Smith signed with Oldham for £150 while Lance Todd signed with Wigan for a massive £400 as well as the captaincy. Duncan McGregor, Joseph Lavery and Jim Gleeson all also opted to stay behind, with McGregor opening a sports shop and playing for Merthyr Tydfil, Lavery signing with Leeds and Gleeson completing his legal studies at the Inns of Court. The rest of the team left Great Britain on 29 February 1908.

== 1908 in Australia ==
The New Zealanders arrived in Australia on 9 April 1908 lacking match fitness after the sea voyage and being short of backs. Several had stayed in Britain and Messenger was to revert to his home teams to play for New South Wales and Australia against the tourists. The All Blacks therefore called up James Barber, a provincial scrum half and utility player who had previously represented Wellington. They then spread themselves around the eight New South Wales Rugby Football League clubs that were preparing for the 1908 NSWRFL season, Australia's first in rugby league, and helped advise them on the rules of the new game.

The tourists stayed in Sydney long enough to watch the first round of the new premiership season, which began on Easter Monday, before heading north to Newcastle. Here they played a Newcastle side at rugby union, defeating them 53–6. They then played a "Northern Districts" selection and defeated them 37–8 in the first ever game of rugby league played in Newcastle. The visit by the touring New Zealand side boosted the profile of rugby league in Newcastle as the Newcastle Rebels were at the time playing all their matches away in Sydney. As a result of the visit playing numbers in Newcastle surged and in 1910 the Rebels dropped out of the Sydney competition to form their own league.

The touring side then returned to Sydney for two matches against New South Wales. The first game was played on 2 May. Sydney had produced a very warm day for the match and the Australian ground suited the open passing of the new Northern Rugby Football Union's rules. The Blues were ahead 14–7 at half time and went on to win the match 18–10. The crowd was impressed with the new code and remained behind after the match to applaud the two teams. This game helped ensure that rugby league would become the dominant winter code in New South Wales. The second game was just as open and the New South Wales side again managed to win 13–10, with the All Blacks being denied a try on full-time by a linesman's call.

=== Test one ===
The first test, Australia's inaugural rugby league international, was shaping up to be an even encounter, with the tourists having regained their match fitness and most of the newly formed Australian side having been involved in the preceding series with New South Wales. The Australian selectors were determined to include some Queenslanders in the side and three were selected, despite no games of rugby league having yet been played in Queensland. Sydney again produced a nice day and 20,000 spectators turned up to see the first ever test match between the ANZAC nations.

AUSTRALIA: Charlie Hedley, Frank Cheadle, Jim Devereux, Dally Messenger, Doug McLean, Albert Rosenfeld, Mick Dore, Ash Hennessy (c), Larry O'Malley, Bob Tubman, Dinny Lutge, Robert Graves, Johnny Rosewell. Bench: Lou Jones.

NEW ZEALAND: Hubert Turtill (c), William Wynyard, John Barber, Harold Rowe, Albert Baskiville, William Tyler, Richard Wynyard, Hercules Wright, Conrad Byrne, William Trevarthan, William Mackrell, Charles Pearce, Dan Gilchrist.

9 May 1908

Australia	10–11	New Zealand
Tries: Lutge, Rosenfeld; Goals: Messenger (2)		Tries: R.Wynyard (2), Baskiville; Goals: Turtill

Royal Agricultural Society Showground, Sydney
Attendance: 20,000
Referee: Tom Costello

New Zealand took control from the start, despite having Massa Johnston wrongly sent off early in the match. By halftime it was 11–2 to the visitors. The Second half however was all Australia and they scored twice to make the score 11–10. With full-time nearing Messenger had two penalty shots but uncharacteristically missed both and the New Zealanders held on to win the first ever test match between the two sides 11–10. Messenger's kicking had been off all game, he had only kicked two despite having fourteen attempts. Albert Baskiville on the other hand had played in his first test match and won much praise with his performance, deserving his try. It would also turn out to be the only test match he ever played. Precisely 100 years later this match was commemorated on 9 May 2008 in the Centenary rugby league test at the Sydney Cricket Ground.

The tourists then headed north to Brisbane for a series of matches leading up to the second test match. The visit did much to kick start rugby league in Queensland. The matches played by the visiting New Zealand side were the first games of rugby league played in the state, despite three Queensland players having already represented the Kangaroos in the first test in Sydney. Baskiville had become ill on the sea voyage up from Sydney and he did not play again for the tourists, being admitted to hospital. The first game, without Baskiville was held on 16 May against Queensland. The Queensland side included Bill Hardcastle who had been an All Black in 1897 before moving to Queensland. New Zealand ran out winners 34–12 in a match that impressed the press and the spectators. The midweek game was against a Brisbane Metropolitan side and the tourists ran out winners 43–10. After the match the players rushed to the Victoria Private Hospital to check on Baskiville. They found him unconscious and his condition quickly deteriorated. Albert Baskiville died late in the afternoon and of 20 May 1908. Harry Palmer headed home with his casket accompanied by a group of players representing each province. Baskiville was buried at Karori Cemetery in Wellington. In the meantime the remaining players had to prepare for the further two test matches. In the build-up they drew 12-all with the same Queensland side that they had earlier beaten 34–12.

=== Test two ===
After the Queensland rugby league team played its first two matches ever against the touring New Zealanders, who also played a match against Brisbane, the Second Test match against Australia was played in Brisbane and 6,000 spectators turned up to watch the first test match to be held in the state. The All Blacks, still grieving over the loss of Baskiville, could only field a skeleton team and did not perform a pre-match haka.

AUSTRALIA: Edward Baird, George Watson, Dally Messenger, Jim Devereux, Frank Cheadle, Albert Rosenfeld, Mick Dore, Dinny Lutge, Jim Davis, Bill Hardcastle, Ash Hennessy (c), Sandy Pearce, Robert Graves.

NEW ZEALAND: Edward Tyne, Harold Rowe, William Wynyard, John Barber, William Tyler, Edgar Wrigley, Richard Wynyard, Conrad Byrne (c), Charles Pearce, William Trevarthan, Angry Cross, Massa Johnston, Adam Lile. Bench: Dan Gilchrist.

30 May 1908

Australia	12–24	New Zealand
Tries: Hardcastle, Lutge; Goals: Messenger (3)		Tries: Rowe (2), Cross, R.Wynyard; Goals: Wrigley (6)

Brisbane Exhibition Ground, Brisbane
Attendance: 6,000
Referee: William Beattie

As they did in the first test New Zealand dominated early in the match, with Harold Rowe scoring early, and by half time the New Zealanders led 15–2. The Second half was no easier for the Australians, and the All Blacks ran out winners 24–12 in one of the most decisive test match displays ever put on by a New Zealand side.

The tourists then headed back to Sydney to prepare for their final match. While they had been in Brisbane the first New Zealand Māori rugby league team had arrived in Sydney on 29 May for their own tour of Australia. The side was led by "Opai" Asher and was to prove another boost to the finances of the New South Wales Rugby Football League.

=== Test three ===
The touring New Zealand Māori rugby league team were at the Showgrounds supporting New Zealand side for the final test, which drew a crowd of 14,000.

AUSTRALIA: Charlie Hedley, Jim Devereux, Dally Messenger, Frank Cheadle, Tommy Anderson, Albert Rosenfeld, Arthur Halloway, Bill Hardcastle, Sandy Pearce, Billy Cann, Lou Jones, Robert Graves, Dinny Lutge (c).

NEW ZEALAND: Edward Tyne, Harold Rowe, John Barber, William Wynyard, William Tyler, Edgar Wrigley, Richard Wynyard, Dan Gilchrist, Angry Cross, William Trevarthan, Charles Pearce (c), Massa Johnston, Adam Lile.

6 June 1908

Australia	14–9	New Zealand
Tries: Anderson, Graves, Jones, Messenger; Goals: Messenger (1)		Tries: R.Wynyard; Goals: Wrigley (3)

Royal Agricultural Society Showground, Sydney
Attendance: 14,000
Referee: Tom Costello

The game developed into a tight, low-scoring affair, and the visitors were ahead 6–0 at halftime. They then extended their lead to 9–3 before Australia came back and then ran out winners 14–9, claiming the country's first test match victory in the final match of the New Zealand tour.

The second visit to Australia by the tourists had done much to boost the game in the country. They had played the first ever rugby league matches in Newcastle and Brisbane and had boosted the coffers of the fledgling New South Wales Rugby League and Queensland Rugby League organisations.

== Aftermath ==
On their return home the tourists an exhibition game at Athletic Park, the first game of rugby league in New Zealand. This match was played on 13 June 1908 and 8,000 people attended to see "Wright's Blacks" defeat "Turtill's Reds" 55–20. The match allowed the team to raise £300 for Mrs Baskiville, Albert's mother.

The tour itself had been a great success both financially -the tour made a £5,641 profit and each player received almost £300- and on the field, where the New Zealanders had defeated both Great Britain and Australia 2–1. These feats were not to be replicated for many years with the New Zealand national team failing to win another series in Australia until 1952 and in Great Britain until 1971.

Other members of the touring party soon returned to join George William Smith, Lance Todd, Duncan McGregor and Joseph Lavery who were all playing in the Northern Union. Edgar Wrigley signed with Runcorn for £400 and a guarantee of employment as a plumber. Harold Rowe joined Leeds and Massa Johnston joined Lance Todd at Wigan. Hubert Turtill also joined St Helens before being killed in World War I. William Trevarthen and Conrad Byrne joined Huddersfield, where they were soon joined by Edgar Wrigley. Arthur Kelly joined Turtill at St Helens.

For the Northern Union the tour had given the game credibility and its first international test opponents since the breakaway code had been established.

In Australia the tour had helped spark the establishment of the game and helped offset the costs of the New South Wales Rugby League's expensive first season. Australia was soon to send its own touring party to Great Britain, although the side did not make as much of a profit as Baskerville's All Blacks had.

In New Zealand the "Northern Union code" did not manage to successfully establish itself as quickly as it did in Australia. Albert Baskiville had been the tour's chief organiser and his death was a huge blow to the game in New Zealand as well as the players personally. Baskiville had also been talking about arranging a tour of the United States of America before his death. In some ways the New Zealanders were too successful as the number of them signing professional contracts meant that there were fewer players to help establish the game back home. Daniel Fraser took a role in organising matches and at Victoria Park on 24 August 1908 8,000 people watched Auckland, captained by Richard Wynyard, defeat Wellington 16–14 in the first provincial match in New Zealand. The two sides met in Petone on 12 September and drew 13-all. A New Zealand side toured Australia in 1909, including six of the original touring party. In Auckland Billy Tyler and Charlie Dunning helped to form the Ponsonby Ponies club while William Mackrell was involved in establishing the Newton rugby league club and the Auckland Rugby League competition started in 1910. The New Zealand Rugby Football League was formally established on 25 April 1910 in preparation for a Great Britain tour later that same year. The Wellington and Canterbury Rugby League competitions were not to start until 1913.

== Legacy ==
In 2002 a Baskerville Shield was created to be contested each time New Zealand took on Great Britain. In 2007 the team was commemorated by the 2007 All Golds Tour which featured an All Golds v Northern Union match as well as a three test series between the New Zealand national rugby league team and Great Britain. Steve Price played the role of Dally Messenger, playing in the All Golds match. The "All Golds", as they had also come to be known in the media due to their professionalism, then played their first ever match in New Zealand in 2008 when they took on the New Zealand Māori in a match that served as a warm up to the 2008 World Cup for the New Zealand national rugby league team.

== Professional status ==
The players on the tour did not consider themselves to be professionals. The members of the tour had all invested £50 and received back an equal share of the tours profits. At this stage none of the players played either rugby code as a career, although several became professionals after the tour had ended. They compared themselves to past tours such as the 1902 Australian cricket tour of England which had shared the profits of the tour and were still regarded as amateurs. The New Zealand Rugby Union considered the players to be professionals and all members of the tour subsequently received a life ban from rugby union.

== Name ==
Kit worn in the tour

The team's registered title was "The New Zealand All Black Rugby Football Team" and it was most often referred to as the All Blacks on the tour, the same name which had been given to The Original amateur rugby union team on their tour of Great Britain in 1905. Like the Originals they were sometimes referred to in the press as New Zealand or other names such as Maorilanders and Colonials. Less favourable members of the press referred to them as the All Golds or Pro Blacks — highlighting the fact that the team was playing for money. The term All Golds was first coined by the Sydney Morning Herald in 1907 as a headline. However colloquially the players would have probably referred to themselves as the All Blacks or the New Zealand rugby team.

Later on, the New Zealand national rugby league team began to be known as the Kiwis instead of the All Blacks. Referring back to the 1907–08 team historians have often called them the professional All Blacks or All Golds. The New Zealand Rugby League has made an effort to reclaim the name All Golds from the negative connotations it once held, and in 1997 fought a legal case over the use of the name with the Australian Rugby League during the Super League war. In 2007 and 2008 an All Golds team took the field to celebrate the centenary of international rugby league.

== Squad ==
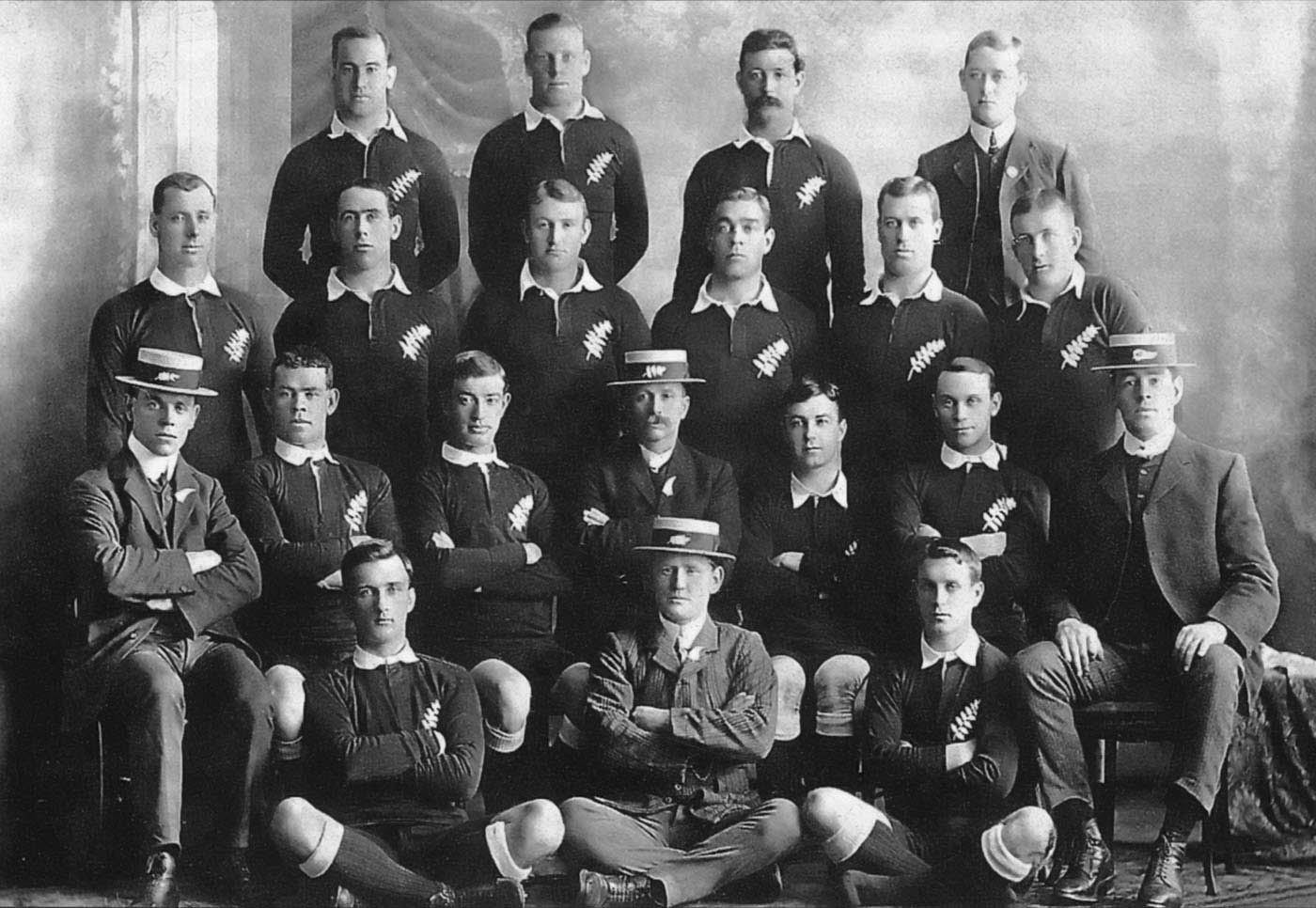
1907 All Golds team photo

The side selected was regarded as surprisingly strong, given the secretive circumstances that it was selected, and included a good mix of experience (nine internationals and fourteen provincial players) and youth.

=== Backs ===
Overall the backs possessed experience and pace. They were a strong attacking unit at the time when New Zealand rugby was well known for its attacking prowess. If the backs had a weakness it was in their defence, as the Northern Union game required stronger defensive skills and more one on one tackling than they were used to.

- Herbert Turtill – Fullback: A rugby union international who played in 1905 against Australia, Turtill was from the Canterbury side and was regarded as well versed in wet weather football.
- Harold Rowe – Fullback: An Auckland provincial player who had utility value.
- Duncan McGregor – Three quarters: Involved in the tour preparations from the outset, McGregor was a rugby union international who had represented both Canterbury and Wellington. When in England with the 1905 Originals the press had dubbed him "The Flying Scotsman".
- George William Smith (vice-captain) – Three quarters: At 35 he was still one of the fastest players in rugby. An Auckland representative and a famous New Zealand rugby union international, Smith had toured with the Originals and was also a champion jockey and world class athlete. Smith had been involved in the tour preparations and was keen to earn a professional contract in England.
- Dally Messenger – Three quarters: The Australian joined the tour in New South Wales after he had starred for the New South Wales side that played against the touring team. Messenger had been a former Australian representative and had recently signed with the New South Wales Rugby League as their star attraction.
- Albert Baskiville – Wing: A speedy winger, Baskiville played in few matches as he concentrated on managing the tour. However he starred in the Australian tests before his tragic death.
- Edgar Wrigley – Outside back: A New Zealand rugby union international and Wairarapa representative from the Red Star Club in Masterton, Wrigley was best suited to the centre or second five eighth positions.
- Joseph Lavery – Centre: A Canterbury representative Lavery had also played for South Island in 1903.
- Richard Wynyard – Inside back: From a strong rugby family, that included his brother William on the tour, Dick had won Auckland selection when he was only 20 and played in the side that won the Ranfurly Shield.
- William Wynyard – Inside back: Billy had won provincial honours later than his younger brother but by 1907 was well established in the Auckland team.
- Lance Todd – Inside back: The regular five eighth for the Auckland team, Todd had not yet achieved All Black or inter-island selection due to the abundance of talent in his position.
- Edward Tyne – Half back: A 1906 Canterbury and South Island representative, Tyne had since moved to Wellington and was selected due to his utility value.
- William Tyler – Half back: Another from the Ranfurly Shield winning Auckland Side, Tyler was large for a Half back and also played Wing-Forward, a position that would quickly be abandoned in the touring team due to the rule changes.
- Arthur Kelly – Half back: One of the Wellington sides most promising young stars, Kelly was currently suspended by the Rugby Union after playing in Nelson under an assumed name and for expenses. The professional charge was never proven but Kelly was suspended for three years for playing under another name.
- Jim Gleeson – Half back: From the Hawkes Bay, Gleeson was selected more for his administration skills than his playing skills and was to become the tour's treasurer.

=== Forwards ===
- Tom "Angry" Cross – Forward: A man of large physique and a rugby union international, Cross had represented the South Island, Otago, Canterbury and Wellington and was regarded as exceptionally quick for his size. His nickname "Angry" was originally a play on his last name, but he was also regarded as one of the "hard men" of New Zealand rugby.
- William Massa Johnston – Forward: Another Otago representative and a New Zealand rugby union international, Johnston had been playing senior football since he was 15. An original tourist, Johnston had become sick on that tour and had been restricted to only 13 matches.
- Eric Watkins – Hooker: A Wellington and Wanganui representative, Watkins had also represented the North Island and the Originals in 1905.
- Hercules Richard "Bumper" Wright (captain) – Hooker: The current Petone and Wellington captain, Wright had also represented North Wairarapa. When he was a soldier in the Boer War, Wright had played for the New Zealand Army Corps team.
- Conrad Byrne – Forward: A farmer and Wellington representative, Byrne was considered a rising star at only 23.
- Adam Lile – Forward: A teammate of Baskivilles, Lile had won North Island selection in 1907.
- Daniel Gilchrist – Forward: Despite being only 23 Gilchrist had represented Wellington consistently since 1904.
- Arthur Callum – Forward: An insurance agent and club mate of Gilchrist, Callum had played for Wellington in 1905 and 1907.
- Charles Pearce – Forward: From Canterbury, Pearce was selected both for his experience and his size. Pearce was a teammate of Lavery and had been a regular member of Canterbury. He had played for the South Island in 1906.
- William Trevarthen – Forward: An Auckland representative, Trevarthen had played for Ohinemuri in 1900 and since 1904 had represented Auckland.
- Charles Dunning – Forward: Dunning was a builder by trade and had represented both Gisbourne and Auckland, where he had become a key member of the Ranfurly Shield team and represented the North Island.
- William Mackrell – Forward: A New Zealand international and Auckland forward, Mackrell had toured with the Originals but played only a few games due to injuries.

=== Administrators ===
- Daniel Fraser – Fraser was from the Petone club in Wellington and had also played for the New Zealand Army Corps in South Africa. He joined the tour in New South Wales and acted as the tour's assistant manager.
- Henry J. Palmer – Financial manager: A leading restaurateur in Wellington with many other business interests, Palmer was involved in organising the tour.

== Organisation ==
As the New Zealand Rugby League was not yet set up, the tour had no official administration body. The touring party legally formed itself into an organisation (The New Zealand All Black Rugby Football team) and each played invested £50 of their own money, quite a sum at that time. The players were paid £1 per week for expenses and then the profits (if any) were to be divided equally at the end of the tour. No bonuses of any kind were paid. Albert Baskiville acted as the tours secretary and did much of the administrative work. He was supported by Harry Palmer (manager), Daniel Fraser (assistant manager) and Jim Gleeson (treasurer).

Disputes while on tour were heard by a Management Committee. This consisted of Jim Gleeson, Harry Palmer, Duncan McGregory, Massa Johnston, Lance Todd, Bumper Wright and Bert Baskiville. This committee had the power to impose fines for indiscretions and even expel someone from the tour party if it was deemed to be necessary.

Hercules Richard Wright was elected the tours captain while George William Smith was elected vice-captain, a sign of the democratic nature of the tours organisation. These two formed the selection committee alongside Massa Johnston.

== Match results ==
Summary
Country	Matches	Won	Drawn	Lost
Total	46	26	3	17
Great Britain	35	19	2	14
Australia	10	6	1	3
Ceylon	1	1	0	0
Tests	8	4	0	4

Date	Opponent	Venue	Result	Score	Rules	Attendance	Report
17 August 1907	New South Wales	Royal Agricultural Society Ground, Sydney	Won	12–8	Rugby Football Union	20,000	
21 August 1907	New South Wales	Royal Agricultural Society Ground, Sydney	Won	19–5	Rugby Football Union	3,000	
24 August 1907	New South Wales	Royal Agricultural Society Ground, Sydney	Won	5–3	Rugby Football Union	8,000	
12 September 1907	(British Ceylon) All Ceylon	Colombo Racecourse, Colombo	Won	33–6	Rugby Football Union	3,000	
9 October 1907	Bramley	McLaren Field, Bramley	Won	25–6	Northern Rugby Football Union	6,000	
12 October 1907	Huddersfield	Fartown Ground, Huddersfield	Won	19–8	Northern Rugby Football Union	10,000	
17 October 1907	Widnes	Lowerhouse Lane, Widnes	Won	26–11	Northern Rugby Football Union	8,000	
19 October 1907	Broughton Rangers	Wheater's Field, Broughton	Won	20–14	Northern Rugby Football Union	24,000	
23 October 1907	Wakefield Trinity	Belle Vue, Wakefield	Drew	5–5	Northern Rugby Football Union	5,000	
26 October 1907	Leeds	Elland Road, Leeds	Won	8–2	Northern Rugby Football Union	12,000	
30 October 1907	St. Helens	Knowsley Road, St. Helens	Won	24–5	Northern Rugby Football Union		
2 November 1907	Merthyr Tydfil	Merthyr Tydfil	Won	27–9	Northern Rugby Football Union		
5 November 1907	Keighley	Lawkholme Lane, Keighley	Won	9–7	Northern Rugby Football Union	8,000	
9 November 1907	Wigan	Central Park, Wigan	Lost	8–12	Northern Rugby Football Union	30,000	
13 November 1907	Barrow	Cavendish Park, Barrow-in-Furness	Lost	3–6	Northern Rugby Football Union	7,000	
16 November 1907	Hull F.C.	The Boulevard, Hull	Won	18–13	Northern Rugby Football Union		
20 November 1907	Leigh	Mather Lane, Leigh	Lost	9–15	Northern Rugby Football Union		
23 November 1907	Oldham	Watersheddings, Oldham	Lost	7–8	Northern Rugby Football Union	15,000	
27 November 1907	Runcorn	Canal Street, Runcorn	Lost	0–9	Northern Rugby Football Union	5,000	
30 November 1907	Dewsbury / Batley XIII	West Yorkshire	Won	18–8	Northern Rugby Football Union		
4 December 1907	Swinton	Chorley Road, Swinton	Won	11–2	Northern Rugby Football Union		
7 December 1907	Rochdale Hornets	Athletic Grounds, Rochdale	Won	19–0	Northern Rugby Football Union		
10 December 1907	Bradford F.C.	Greenfield, Bradford	Lost	2–7	Northern Rugby Football Union	4,000	
14 December 1907	Halifax	Thrum Hall, Halifax	Lost	4–9	Northern Rugby Football Union	11,000	
18 December 1907	Yorkshire	Belle Vue, Wakefield	Won	23–4	Northern Rugby Football Union		
21 December 1907	Warrington	Wilderspool Stadium, Warrington	Lost	7–8	Northern Rugby Football Union	10,000	
26 December 1907	Hunslet	Parkview Ground, Hunslet	Drew	11–11	Northern Rugby Football Union		
28 December 1907	Salford	The Willows, Salford	Won	9–2	Northern Rugby Football Union	12,000	
1 January 1908	Wales	Aberdare Athletic Ground, Aberdare	Lost	8–9	Northern Rugby Football Union	20,000	
4 January 1908	Hull Kingston Rovers	Craven Street, Hull	Won	6–3	Northern Rugby Football Union	10,000	
8 January 1908	(Cumbria) Cumberland	Lonsdale Park, Workington	Lost	9–21	Northern Rugby Football Union		
11 January 1908	England XIII	Central Park, Wigan	Lost	16–18	Northern Rugby Football Union	12,000	
18 January 1908	Lancashire	Watersheddings, Oldham	Lost	4–20	Northern Rugby Football Union		
25 January 1908	(United Kingdom) Northern Union	Headingley, Leeds	Lost	6–14	Northern Rugby Football Union	8,182	
29 January 1908	York	Clarence Street, York	Lost	3–5	Northern Rugby Football Union		
1 February 1908	Ebbw Vale	Bridge End Field, Ebbw Vale	Won	3–2	Northern Rugby Football Union	10,000	
8 February 1908	(United Kingdom) Northern Union	Stamford Bridge, London	Won	18–6	Northern Rugby Football Union	14,000	
15 February 1908	(United Kingdom) Northern Union	Whaddon Road, Cheltenham	Won	8–5	Northern Rugby Football Union	4,000	
22 February 1908	St Helens	Knowsley Road, St. Helens	Won	21–10	Northern Rugby Football Union		
22 April 1908	Newcastle	Newcastle Showgrounds, Newcastle	Won	53–6	Northern Rugby Football Union		
25 April 1908	Northern Districts	Newcastle Showgrounds, Newcastle	Won	37–8	Northern Rugby Football Union	700	
2 May 1908	New South Wales	Royal Agricultural Society Ground, Sydney	Lost	10–18	Northern Rugby Football Union	18,000	
6 May 1908	New South Wales	Royal Agricultural Society Ground, Sydney	Lost	10–13	Northern Rugby Football Union	8,000	
9 May 1908	Australia	Royal Agricultural Society Ground, Sydney	Won	11–10	Northern Rugby Football Union	20,000	
16 May 1908	Queensland	Brisbane Exhibition Ground, Brisbane	Won	34–12	Northern Rugby Football Union		
20 May 1908	Brisbane	Brisbane Exhibition Ground, Brisbane	Won	43–10	Northern Rugby Football Union		
23 May 1908	Queensland	Brisbane Exhibition Ground, Brisbane	Drew	12–12	Northern Rugby Football Union		
30 May 1908	Australia	Brisbane Exhibition Ground, Brisbane	Won	24–12	Northern Rugby Football Union	6,000	
6 June 1908	Australia	Royal Agricultural Society Ground, Sydney	Lost	9–14	Northern Rugby Football Union	14,000	
