= Edward Tyne =

New Zealand international rugby league footballer

Personal information
- Full name: Edmund Tyne
- Born: 18 October 1879 Napier, New Zealand
- Died: 9 August 1959 (aged 79) Māngere, Auckland, New Zealand

Playing information
- Height: 178 cm (5 ft 10 in)
- Weight: 78.5 kg (12 st 5 lb)

Rugby union
- Position: Scrum-half
Club
Years	Team	Pld	T	G	FG	P
1900	Pirates		1	0	0	3
1901–04	Napier City	37	4	0	1	16
1905	Linwood	10	1	0	0	3
1906	Albion	6	1	0	0	3
1907	Petone	11	3	0	0	9
	Total	64	10	0	1	34
Representative
Years	Team	Pld	T	G	FG	P
1901–04	Hawke's Bay	20	1	0	0	3
1904	Napier	1	0	0	0	0
1905–06	Canterbury	11	0	0	0	0
1906	South Island	1	0	0	0	0

Rugby league
- Position: Fullback, Halfback
Club
Years	Team	Pld	T	G	FG	P
1909	Rover	1	0	0	0	0
Representative
Years	Team	Pld	T	G	FG	P
1907–08	New Zealand	16 (2)	3	0	0	6
1908	A Team (Exhibition Match)	1	2	0	0	6
1908	Wellington	1	1	0	0	3
1909	Dannevirke	1	0	0	0	0

Edward "Hone" Tyne (1879–1959) was a New Zealand rugby footballer who was part of the professional 1907-1908 New Zealand rugby tour of Great Britain.

== Early life ==
Tyne was a railway worker, working for the New Zealand Railways Department.

== Rugby football ==
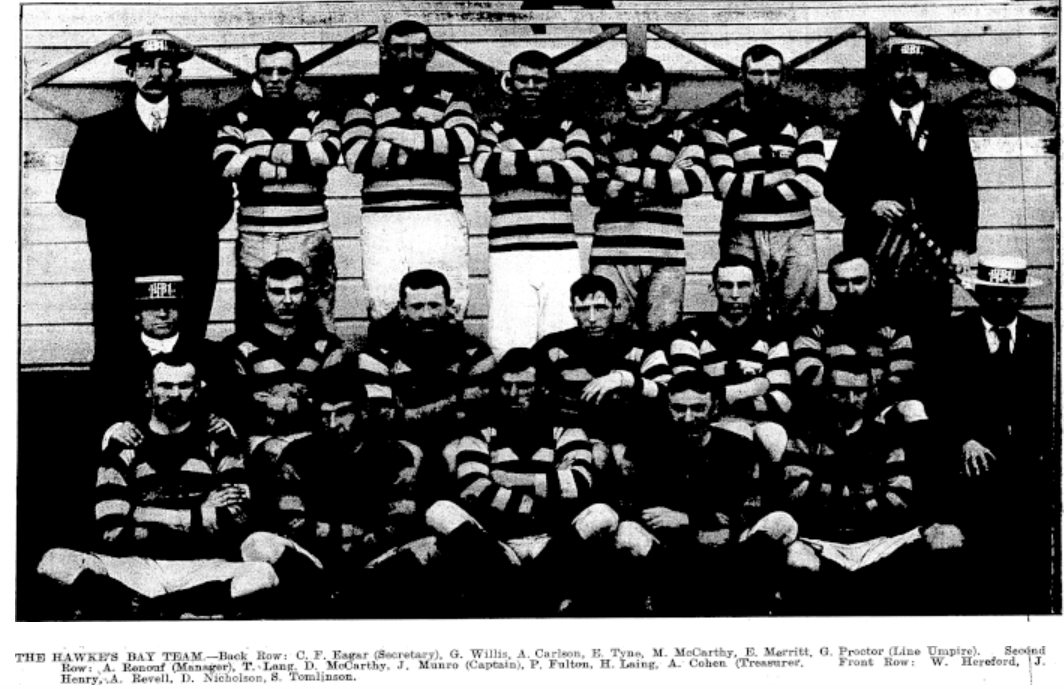
Hawke's Bay rugby team on their Southern Tour in 1903. Tyne is in the centre of the back row.

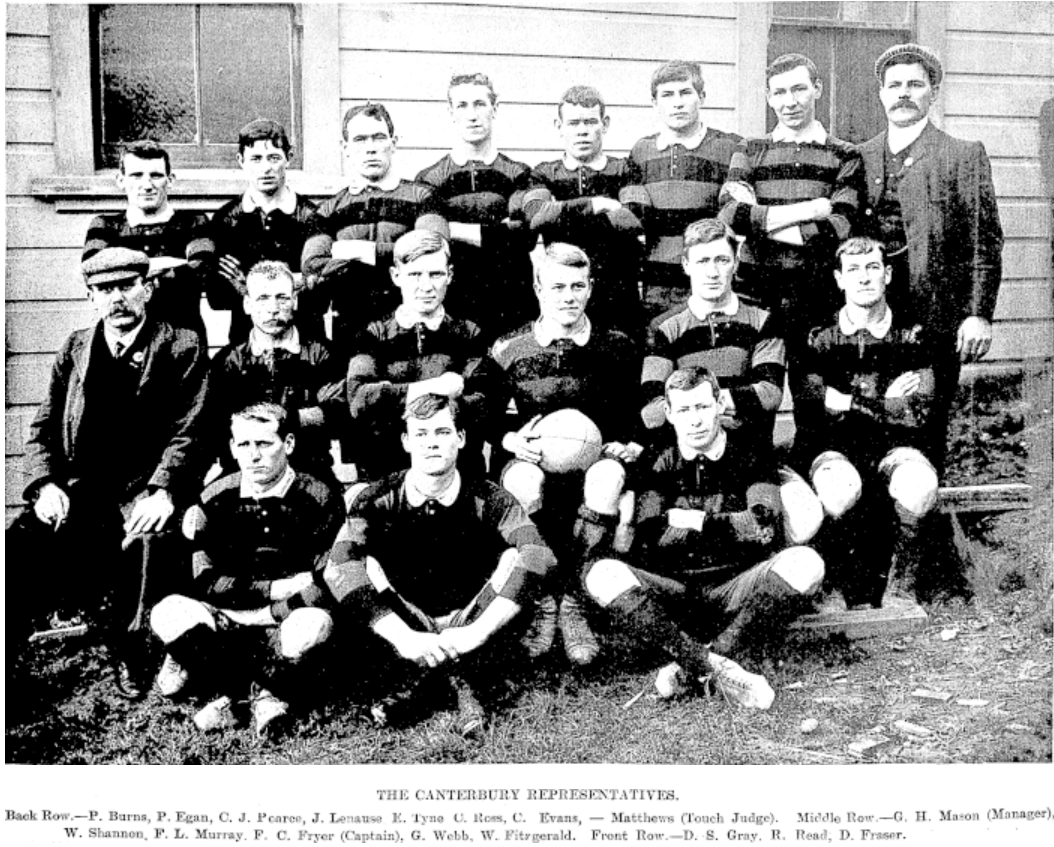
The Canterbury rugby team of 1906 with Tyne 4th from the right in the back row.

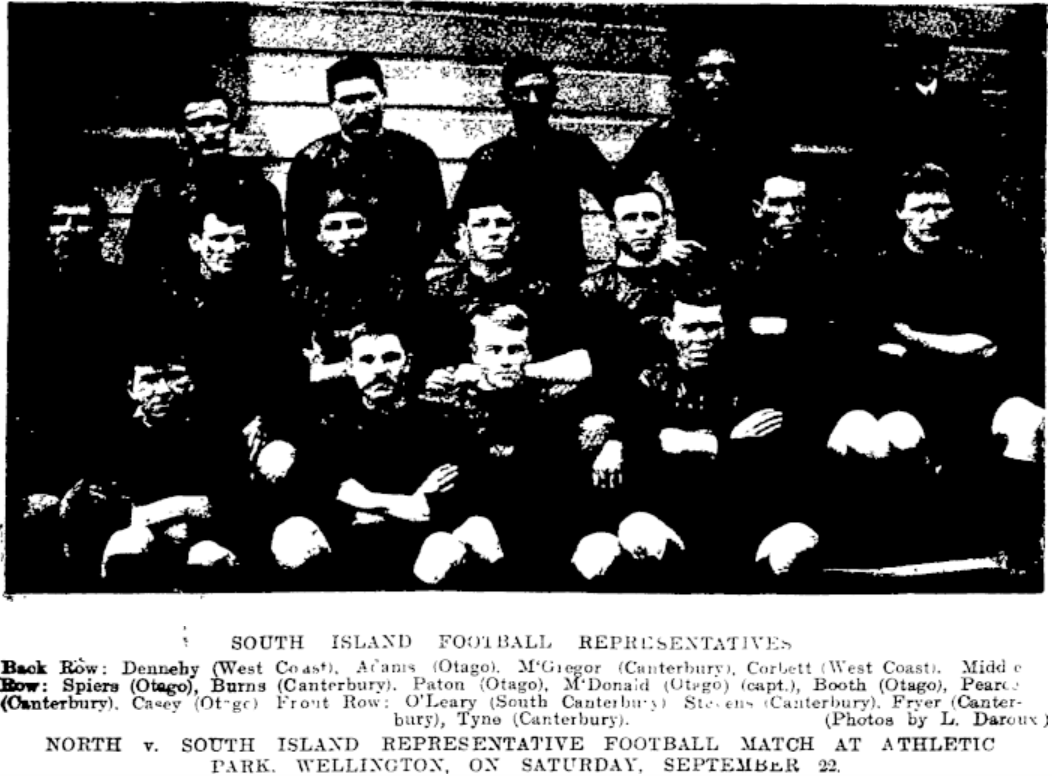
The South Island rugby team of 1906. Tyne is in the front row on the right.

Tyne usually played at Scrum Half but also played at Wing-Forward, a position that, by the 1900s, was only still seen in New Zealand rugby union. Tyne played in Hawke's Bay for the Pirates club as a junior and then for the Napier City club. He made his representative debut for Hawke's Bay against Canterbury on 24 August 1901 at Lancaster Park. In 1903 he went on Hawke's Bay's southern tour and played in matches against Canterbury, Southland, and Otago before being injured and returning home early, missing their final two matches. In 1904 he captained the side at times including against Bush Union on 23 July in a 21-0 win. He ultimately made 20 appearances for Hawke's Bay over 4 years and then moved to Canterbury in 1905 where he joined the Linwood club. In 1906 he transferred to the Albion club for the however he only played in around 6 games after being injured early in the season. He did however return to play for 4 club matches before being selected for Canterbury once more in matches against Taranaki, Auckland, Wellington, and Southland. Tyne was then selected for the South Island side in 1906 and played in their 9-5 loss at Athletic Park in Wellington. In 1907 he moved north to Petone due to his work, joining the Petone Rugby Club after rumours to start the season that he would join Poneke.

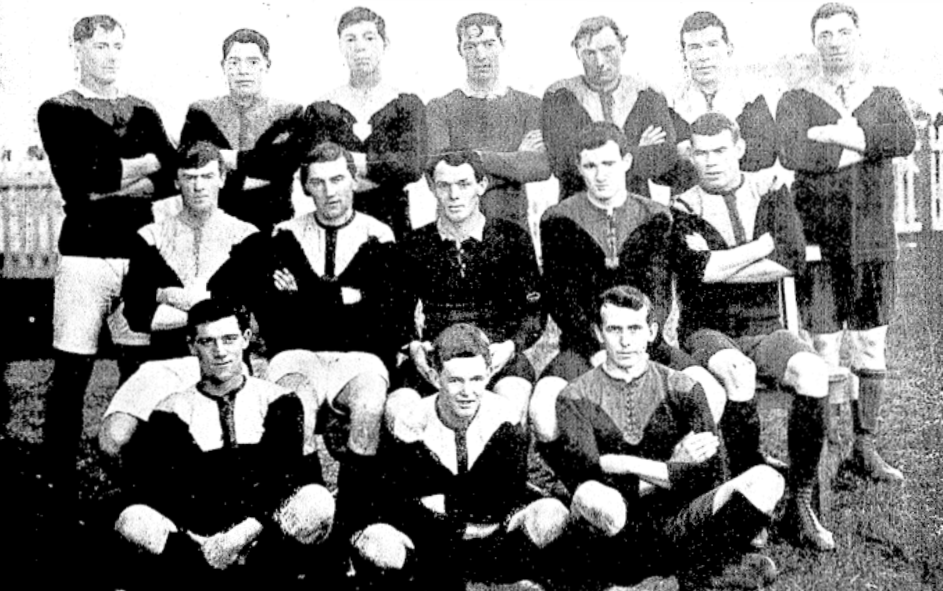
Petone senior side of 1907. Tyne is seated on the right in the middle row.

== Rugby league ==
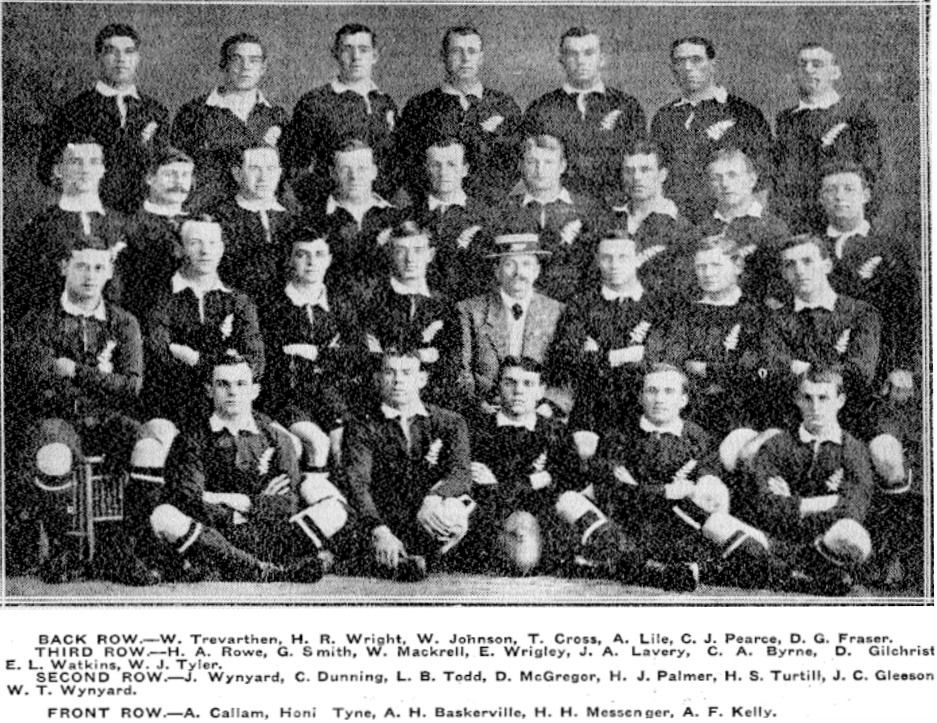
The New Zealand rugby league team of 1907-08. Tyne is in the front row, second from the left.

Tyne was selected to go on the 1907-08 professional rugby tour of Great Britain and Australia, in part because his size meant he could play most positions. He was one of six players from the Petone Rugby Club selected along with Tom Cross, Arthur Kelly, Hercules Wright, and James Barber. Tyne played in three test matches while on tour and scored two tries.

After returning to New Zealand, Tyne played in an exhibition match at Athletic Park in Wellington to raise money for Albert Baskerville's widowed mother following Albert's death from pneumonia during their tour. He scored 2 tries in a 55-20 win to his side before a crowd of 8,000. Wellington selected a representative side to travel to Auckland to play. Tyne was chosen for the tour but King was selected ahead of him in the three quarters. He was however selected to play for Wellington against the same opponent on 12 September at the Petone Recreation Ground. The match was drawn 13-13 with Tyne scoring a try. Tyne then moved back to the Hawke's Bay and was one of the founders of Hawke's Bay Rugby League with fellow tourist Jim Gleeson. He played a match for a Dannevirke side in 1911 against Napier and also played for the very short lived Rover club side against Kaitere in the same year.

== Personal life ==
Tyne was born to Margaret and Thomas Tyne in Napier. He had two younger brothers (John Thomas 1881-1952 and Thomas 1883-1937), and two younger sisters (Mary Ann (May) 1884-1940, and Catherine Ellen (Kate) 1887-1953).

He married Alice Meagher Tyne (nee. Stapleton) on 25 August 1909. They had a son named Edmund in 1910 and a daughter named Margaret in 1911. Margaret died in 1942, aged 31, while Edmund died in 1966 aged 56. In 1914 he was living at 51 Marine Parade and working as a billiard marker. Tyne later moved to Auckland where he worked as a grocer and a barman. He died at Cornwall Hospital on 8 August 1959 while he had been living in Māngere, Auckland.

== Legacy ==
Tyne was named as the Centre in the Petone Panthers' Team of the Century in 2012. Though there is no record of him ever playing for the club as he had moved to Hawke's Bay several years prior to their inception in 1912.
