= Tom Cross (rugby) =

NZ dual-code international rugby footballer

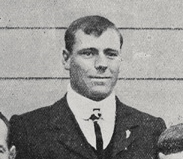

Personal information
- Full name: Thomas William Cross
- Born: 21 January 1876 Dunedin, New Zealand
- Died: 3 July 1930 (aged 54) Wellington, New Zealand

Playing information
- Height: 182 cm (6 ft 0 in)
- Weight: 93 kg (14 st 9 lb)

Rugby union
- Position: Back row, Lock
Club
Years	Team	Pld	T	G	FG	P
1896–1900	Kaikorai	42	0	0	0	0
1897	Kaikorai-Pirates	1	0	0	0	0
1901–02	Linwood	20	0	0	0	0
1903	Poneke	10	2	0	0	6
1904–07	Petone	42	4	0	0	12
	Total	115	6	0	0	18
Representative
Years	Team	Pld	T	G	FG	P
1898–00	Otago	13	1	0	0	3
1901–02	Canterbury	15	0	0	0	0
1901–06	New Zealand	3 (2)	1 (1)	0 (0)	0 (0)	3 (3)
1902	South Island	1	0	0	0	0
1903–07	Wellington	28	2	0	0	6
1905–07	Wellington Province	3	0	0	0	0
1906	North Island	1	0	0	0	0

Rugby league
- Position: Loose forward
Representative
Years	Team	Pld	T	G	FG	P
1907–08	New Zealand	43	7	0	0	21
1909	Wellington	2	1	0	0	3

Tom "Angry" William Cross was a New Zealand rugby footballer who represented New Zealand in both rugby union and rugby league.

== Early years ==
Cross worked as a labourer and while in Petone worked at the Gear Meat Works.

== Rugby football ==
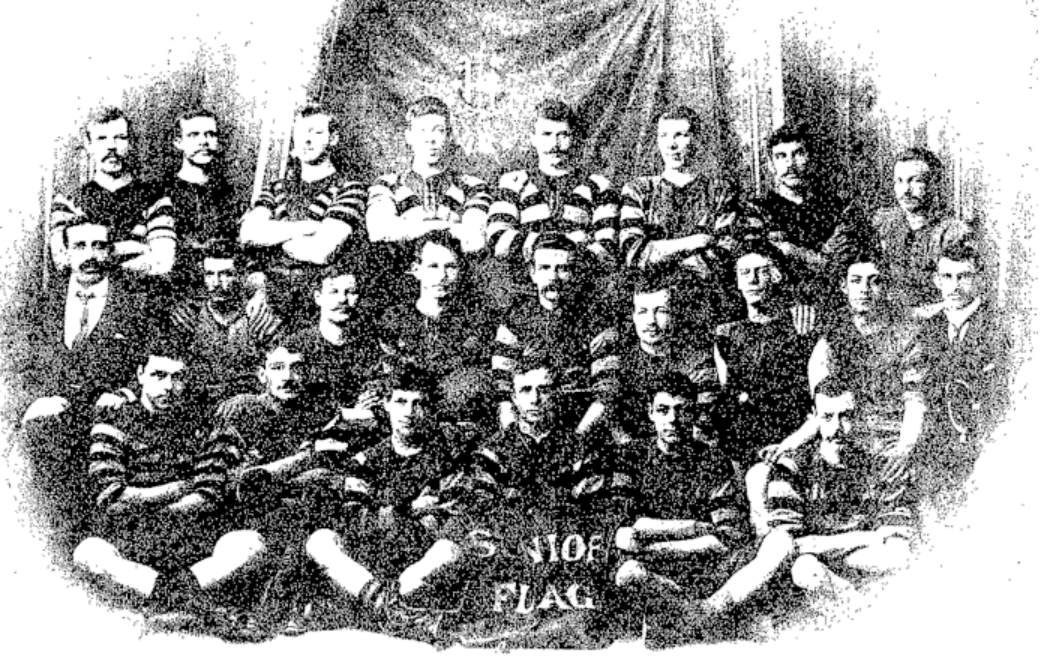
The Kaikorai senior team in 1900. Tom Cross is third from the left in the back row.

Cross was originally from Dunedin and played rugby union for the Kaikorai Club in 1896. Cross was considered a very large man for the times and he represented Otago from 1898 to 1900. He then joined the Linwood club in Christchurch and represented Canterbury from 1901 to 1902, gaining South Island selection in 1902. By 1903 he had moved to Wellington and played for both the Poneke and Petone Rugby Clubs. In his fourth match for Poneke against Melrose on May 23, 1903, he dislocated his shoulder and was taken to hospital. He had been named to play in his Wellington debut against Wairarapa but due to the injury was unable to.

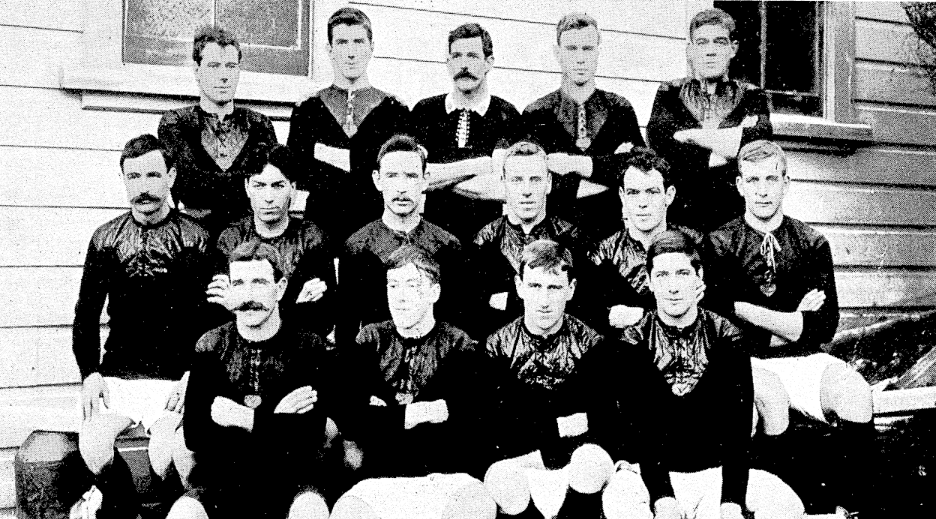
The Wellington Provincial team which defeated Australia in 1905 by 23 points to 7 at Athletic Park. Cross is in the back row on the left.

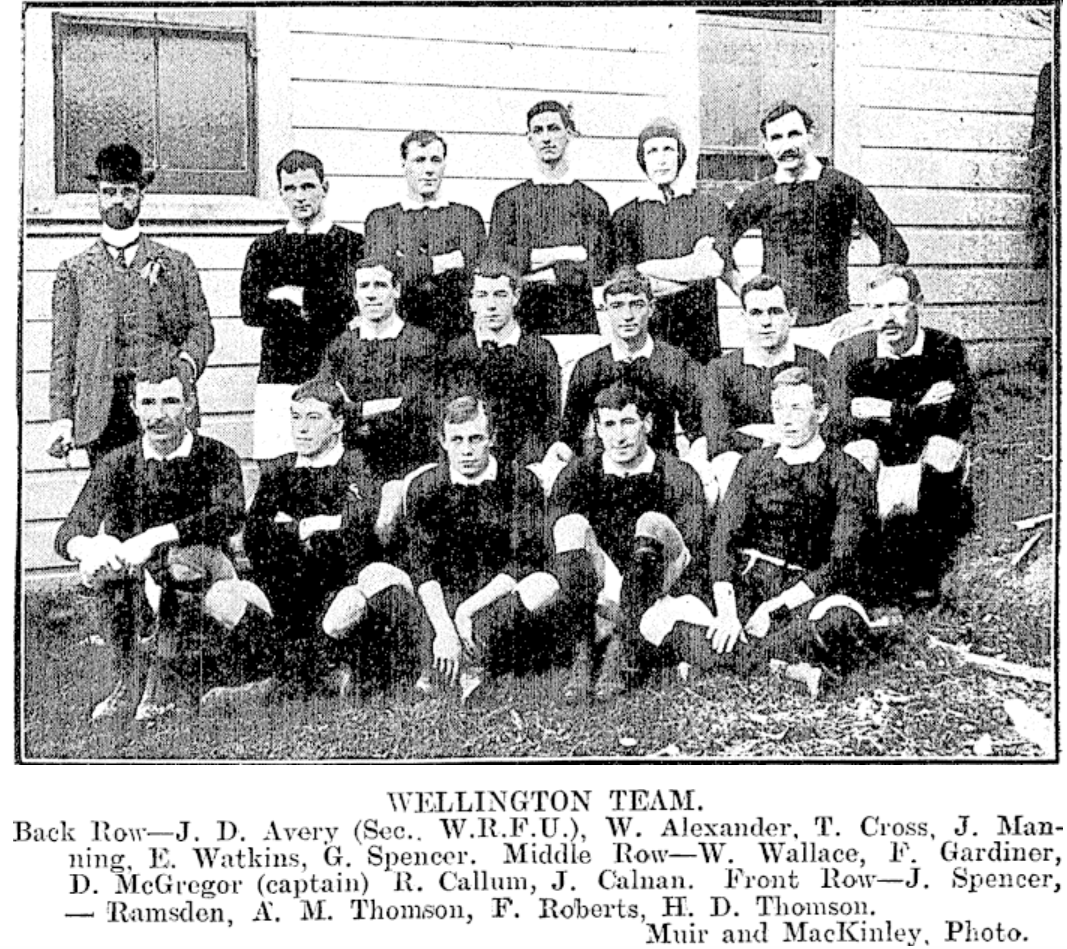

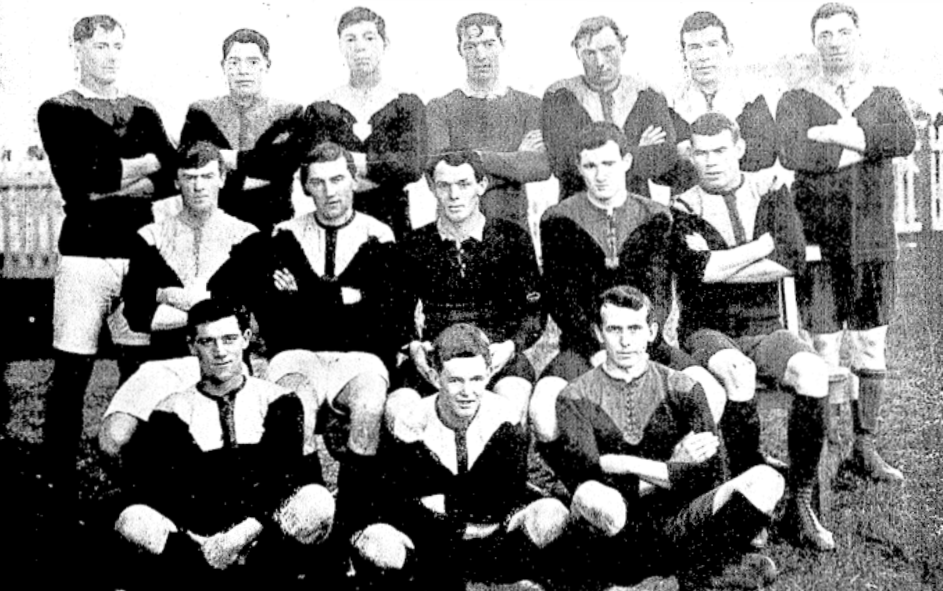
The Petone senior team of 1907. Cross is in the back row on the left.

He also played for Wellington Province twice in 1905 against New Zealand on July 29 and Australia on August 19. On September 3 he played in the test match against Australia which New Zealand won 14–3. He scored near the posts with the try converted to set the final score. Cross was injured during the match and missed several representative matches for Wellington over the subsequent weeks. When in Wellington he also played for the North Island, being one of the first players to have represented both Islands. He ended his rugby union career on a sour note, being sent off for foul play in a club match and subsequently suspended for the rest of the season. The incident occurred on July 13 in a match against St James. He alleged that he had been kicked whilst on the ground and got up and attempted to strike his opponent though no blow as landed. The referee sent him off immediately despite his protests. He then joined the New Zealand Northern Union (rugby league) team which had been organised by Albert Henry Baskerville soon after and departed for England on August 9 with the side. Cross made his All Blacks debut in 1901 and won selection again in 1904 and 1905. At the time he was regarded as one of the "hard men" of New Zealand rugby.

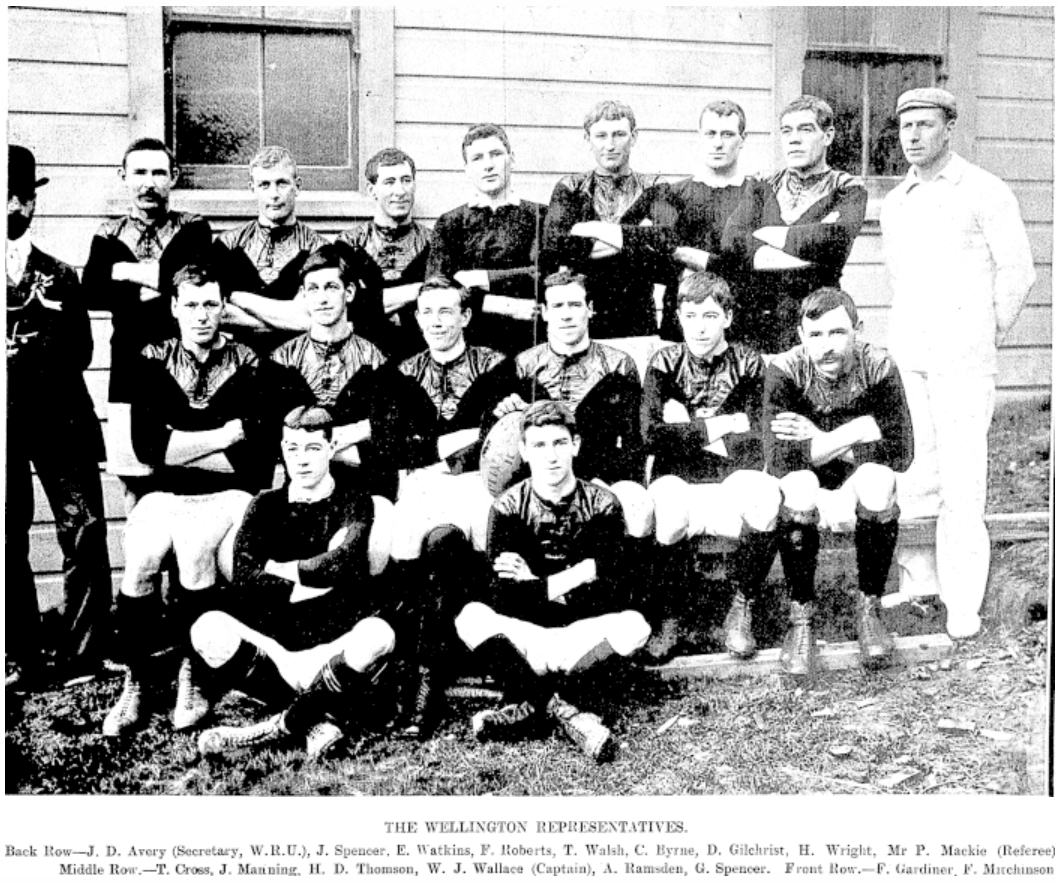
Wellington rugby team in 1906

== Rugby league ==
Being an excellent support player despite his large size made him an automatic selection for the professional All Blacks in their 1907–08 tour of Great Britain and Australia. He was one of six players from the Petone Rugby Club selected. While on tour Cross played in all eight test matches and, along with Wright, Johnston and Pearce, made up the core of the forward pack during the tour. He was sent off in the third test match against the Northern Union but scored a try in the second test against Australia.

He returned from the tour in June 1908. In April, 1909 he narrowly escaped death at the Gear Meat Company in Petone when extension work they were carrying out saw scaffolding and steel beams collapse. One of the beams killed an employee and Cross and one other were seriously injured. It was said afterwards that he would not play again but he appeared for Wellington in their match with Taranaki on October 2 at the Petone ground, and against Auckland on October 9, 1909, at Victoria Park, where he scored a try in a 22–19 win. This was the first of only five victories for Wellington over Auckland in over 100 years. Cross retired after the 1909 season.

Like five other members of the touring party Cross is buried at Karori Cemetery.

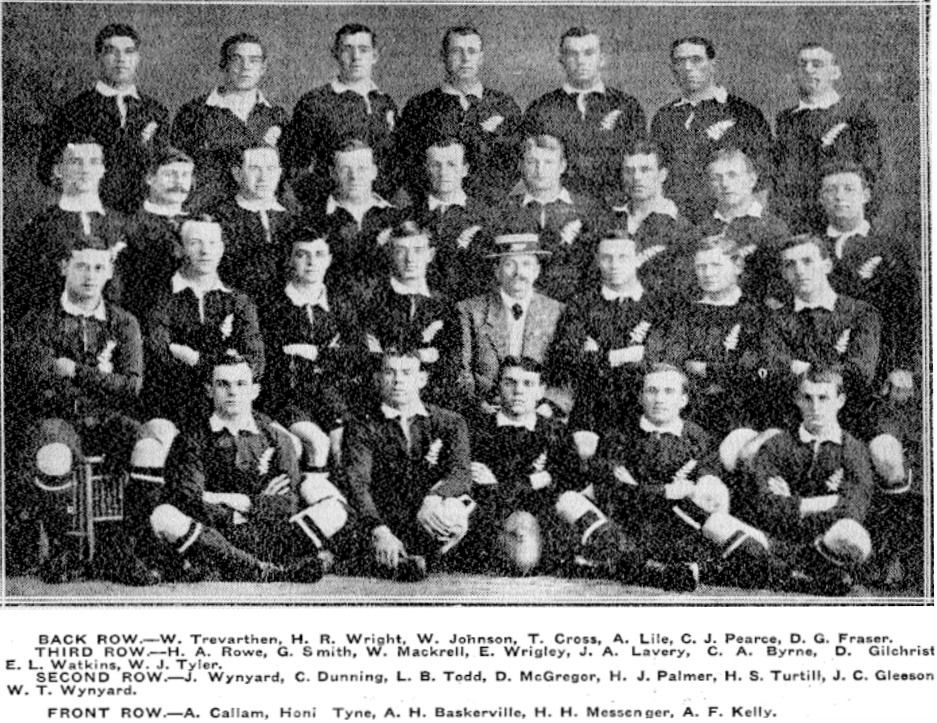
New Zealand Rugby League Team of 1907-08 to Tour England

== Legacy ==
In 1926 a benefit match was played for Cross between his former Poneke and Petone rugby clubs as he was seriously ill. Petone won the match 21-6 before a crowd of 3,000. It was reported in 1928 that he was in hospital suffering from "spinal trouble".

Cross died on July 3, 1930, aged just 54 at the Wellington Public Hospital. Comments and obituaries appeared for him in several newspapers from areas where he had played. The Kaikorai club senior side wore white armbands in their match against Varsity B in the weekend following his death in his memory.

Cross was named in the Second-row in the Petone Panthers' Team of the Century in 2012. Although bizarrely it appears he did not play for them at all as he was 32 when he returned from the tour of Australia and England and then suffered his accident early in 1909 and took some time to recover. He was present at the meeting which formed the club on Wednesday, September 16, 1908. And was elected on to the committee. However the club did not amount to anything at this point and it was years before they began playing games in 1912.
