= Joseph Lavery =

New Zealand rugby union and rugby league international footballer

Joe Lavery
Personal information
- Full name: Joseph Lavery
- Born: 18 August 1880 Christchurch, Canterbury, New Zealand
- Died: September 1948 (aged 68) Ashton-under-Lyne, England

Playing information
- Height: 170 cm (5 ft 7 in)
- Weight: 76 kg (12 st 0 lb)

Rugby union
- Position: Centre
Club
Years	Team	Pld	T	G	FG	P
1902–04	Canterbury

Rugby league
- Position: Fullback, Centre
Club
Years	Team	Pld	T	G	FG	P
1907–07	St Helens	1	0	0	0	0
1908	Leeds	10	4	0	0	12
1909	Leigh	12	3	0	0	9
1910	Salford	4	0	0	0	0
1913	Linwood Keas	4	0	0	0	0
	Total	31	7	0	0	21
Representative
Years	Team	Pld	T	G	FG	P
1907–08	New Zealand	1
1915	Canterbury	1		0	0	0

Joseph Aloysius Lavery (18 August 1880 – September , 1948) was a New Zealand rugby footballer who was part of the professional 1907-1908 New Zealand rugby tour of Great Britain.

== Early years ==
Lavery worked on for the New Zealand Railways Department.

== Rugby football ==
Lavery started his career playing for Temuka in 1901 before moving to Christchurch Albion where he was a club mate of Hubert Turtill and Charlie Pearce. Lavery represented Canterbury between 1902 and 1904 and played for the South Island in 1903.

== Rugby league ==
Lavery joined the professional All Blacks tour of Great Britain and Australia in 1907-1908, thus switching codes to rugby league as all members of the touring party received a life ban from the New Zealand Rugby Union. However, he was not in the touring parties first selection and played mostly in mid-week games, scoring two tries. Despite this Lavery played in one test match for New Zealand.

After the tour Lavery opted to stay in Britain and signed with first St Helens, then moved to Leeds, becoming the club's first ever overseas player. Lavery also played for Leigh, and then Salford in 1910, and was also the first ever overseas player to play for either club.

By 1913 he had returned to New Zealand and played for Linwood in the first season of the Canterbury Rugby League competition. He represented Canterbury in 1915.

== Later years ==
Lavery fought in World War I, and in May 1918 the Linwood club minutes recorded a "vote of sympathy" for Lavery, "who had returned wounded".
