= Rugby League Hawkes Bay =

Rugby body

Club information
- Founded: 1911

Current details
- Chairman: Kevin Tamati

Rugby League Hawkes Bay is the local sporting body responsible for the administration of rugby league in the Hawke's Bay region of New Zealand. The RLHB run the local club competition and are responsible for the Hawke's Bay rugby league team. They are part of the New Zealand Rugby League's Mid-Central Zone and their players are eligible for the Central Vipers.

== History ==
Rugby league was first established in the region in 1911 thanks to two former All Golds Jim Gleeson and Edward Tyne. Former All Black David Evans helped persuade three Hawke's Bay clubs; Clive, Ahuriri and Kia Toa, to switch en masse to rugby league and form the basis of the first club competition. Mayor Vigor Brown ensured that rugby league had access to McLean Park. They were admitted to the New Zealand Rugby League that same year.

In 1989, after many years without regular access to local grounds, the Premier and Reserve club finals were both played at McLean Park. Among those present were NZRL president George Rainey and chief executive Mike Knowles who with HBRL chairman Kel Lenord met with the Mayor of Napier and other city council personnel that day. It was as a result of the progress rugby league was starting to make again in Hawke's Bay, including access to the park, that the opening game of the 1990 Great Britain tour of New Zealand was played there, against an NZ President's X111. In the mid-2000s the Hawkes Bay and Gisborne Tairawhiti Rugby League ran a combined club competition called the Eastern Alliance.

Rugby League Hawkes Bay celebrated its centenary in August 2011. Former Kiwi Kevin Tamati is the current chairman.

== Club history - Premier Champions ==
1984: Omahu Huia 1986: Omahu Huia 1987: Omahu Huia 1988: Flaxmere Falcons 1989: Flaxmere Falcons 1991: Flaxmere Falcons 1992: Tamatea 1993: Tamatea 1994: Taradale Eagles 1995: Taradale Eagles 1996: Taradale Eagles 1997: Taradale Eagles 2021: Omahu Huia

Age-grade champions 2008: Tamatea u19's
