= Treharne =

Treharne is a surname. Notable people with the surname include:

- Colin Treharne (born 1937), Welsh footballer
- Edward Treharne (1862–1904), Welsh rugby union footballer
- Elaine Treharne (born 1964), Welsh medievalist
- Llewellyn Treharne, Welsh rugby union and rugby league footballer
- Trevor Treharne, Australian sports journalist
