= Arthur Kelly (rugby) =

NZ international rugby league footballer

Personal information
- Full name: Arthur Frederick Kelly
- Born: 24 December 1886 Petone, Wellington, New Zealand
- Died: 1965 (aged 78–79) Oldham, England

Playing information
- Height: 167 cm (5 ft 6 in)
- Weight: 66 kg (10 st 6 lb)

Rugby union
- Position: Centre, Scrum-half
Club
Years	Team	Pld	T	G	FG	P
	Wellington

Rugby league
- Position: Wing, Stand-off, Halfback
Club
Years	Team	Pld	T	G	FG	P
1908–13	St. Helens	64	8	6	0	36
Representative
Years	Team	Pld	T	G	FG	P
1907–08	New Zealand	3	1	0	0	3
1908	Wellington

Arthur Frederick Kelly (born Christmas Eve 1886 in Petone, New Zealand) was a rugby footballer who was part of the professional 1907-1908 New Zealand rugby tour of Great Britain.

== Early years ==
Kelly was an apprentice, working for the New Zealand Railways Department.

== Rugby Football ==
Kelly, from the Petone Rugby Club, was one of Wellington's most promising young talents and was renowned for his tackling abilities.

However, when in Nelson he was involved in a bet over his tackling skills. Kelly played a club game in Nelson and, winning the bet, received "liberal expenses". His form was so impressive that Nelson selectors reportedly offered him a place in the teams Seddon Shield representative side. This led to the story of what had happened getting out and the New Zealand Rugby Union charged him with professionalism, which would have resulted in a lifetime ban from rugby union. The charge could not be proven but instead he was found guilty of playing under an assumed name and was banned for three years. This left him eager to accept opportunities to play rugby elsewhere.

== Rugby League ==
As a result, Kelly joined the professional All Blacks in their tour of Great Britain and Australia, ironically receiving the lifetime ban from the New Zealand Rugby Union that he had narrowly avoided earlier. He was one of six players from the Petone Rugby Club selected. He played in three test matches on the tour and scored the first try in the first ever rugby league test match against Wales, his only try of the tour.

He returned to New Zealand with the touring party but signed with St. Helens in December and returned to Great Britain. He was St. Helens first ever overseas signing. He became a popular figure in St Helens and this led to the club signing another of the touring team, Hubert Turtill.

Kelly later became the captain and player-coach of the "A" Team and led them to win the Lancashire Shield in 1913–14.

On the outbreak of War Kelly joined the Corps of Colonials in the British Army. Kelly survived the War and lived out his later years in Oldham. He died in Oldham in 1965.
