= Jim Gleeson (rugby) =

New Zealand international rugby league footballer (born 1882)

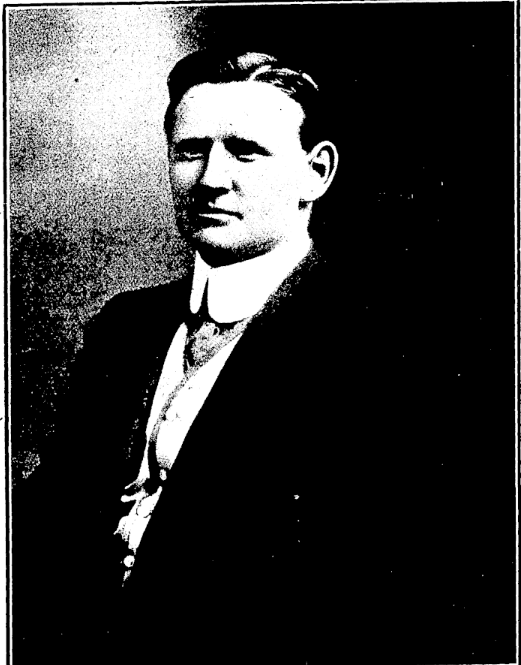
- Born: James Collins Gleeson; 22 December 1882; Auckland, New Zealand
- Died: 21 November 1947 (aged 64); Howick, New Zealand
- Education: Sydney University
- Occupation: Lawyer
- Spouse: Erema Philomena Harding
- Children: 3
- Rugby league career

Playing information
- Height: 5 ft 9 in (1.75 m)
- Weight: 12 st 0 lb (76 kg)

Rugby union
- Position: Scrum-half
Club
Years	Team	Pld	T	G	FG	P
1901–02	Oriental	14	2	0	1	9
1901	St Patricks College Old Boys (friendly)	1	0	0	0	0
1901	Law (business friendly)	1	0	0	0	0
	Total	16	2	0	1	9

Rugby league
Representative
Years	Team	Pld	T	G	FG	P
1907–08	New Zealand	3	0	0	0	0

James Collins Gleeson was a New Zealand rugby footballer who was part of the professional 1907-1908 New Zealand rugby tour of Great Britain.

== Early years ==
He was born in New Zealand on 22 December 1882. His parents were Margaret and Patrick Gleeson. He had 2 sisters and 1 brother (Catherine Treston Gleeson, Margaret Gleeson, Michael Lynch Gleeson, and Patrick Spellman Gleeson). He married Erema Philomena Harding and they had 3 children. Jim was a lawyer by trade who had studied law at Sydney University.

== Rugby football ==
Gleeson was a rugby union scrum-half from the Hawkes Bay.

== Rugby league ==
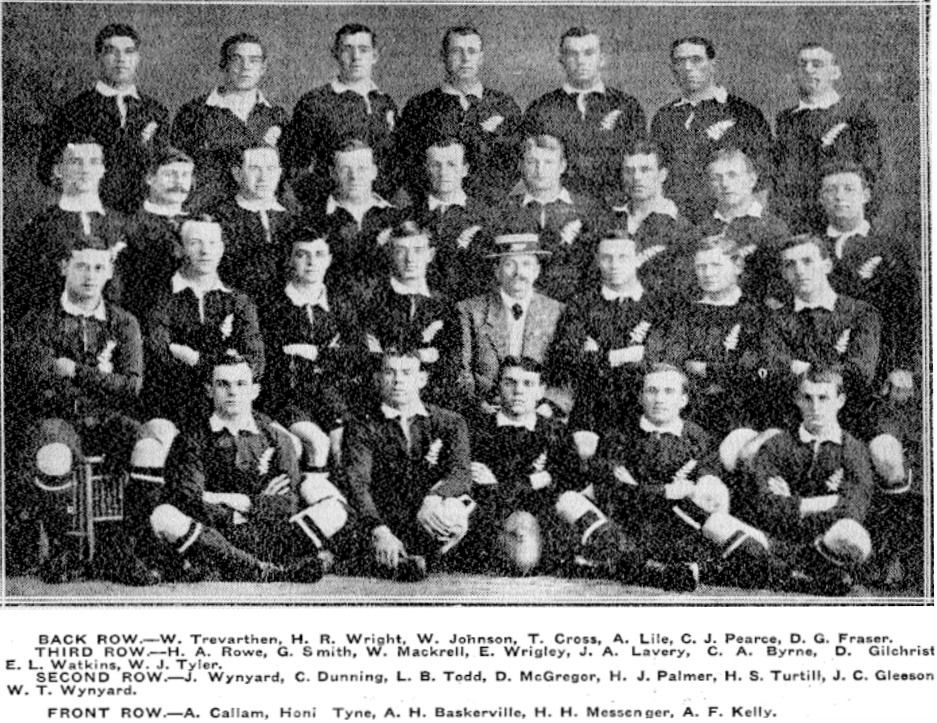
Jim Gleeson in the 2nd row, second from the right

He was selected as one of the professional All Blacks on the 1907–1908 tour of Great Britain and Australia. It was reported prior to the tour that "another rumour has it that Paddy Gleeson, a rising barrister and solicitor in Napier, and the eldest son of an ex-Auckland hotel-keeper who is worth a mint of money, has been offered the position of manager of the team". However his major role on the tour was managerial, serving as treasurer and assisting Albert Baskiville with day-to-day administration duties. He was also part of the tours Management Committee and he usually spoke at the after match functions on behalf of the team. Despite these commitments Gleeson still participated in some matches, usually at halfback but occasionally on the wing.

When the tour finished Gleeson opted to stay behind in England and complete his legal studies at the Inns of Court. After he completed his studies he returned to New Zealand where he, along with Edward Tyne, helped establish the Hawke's Bay Rugby League in 1911. He later served on the New Zealand Council of the New Zealand Rugby League.

In 1928 he welcomed the touring English team to New Zealand and "intimated that he would present a cup to the side which won the "ashes" during the present visit." Before the team departed he gave "a silver cup to the English team and also a cup each to the managers".

== Business life and death ==
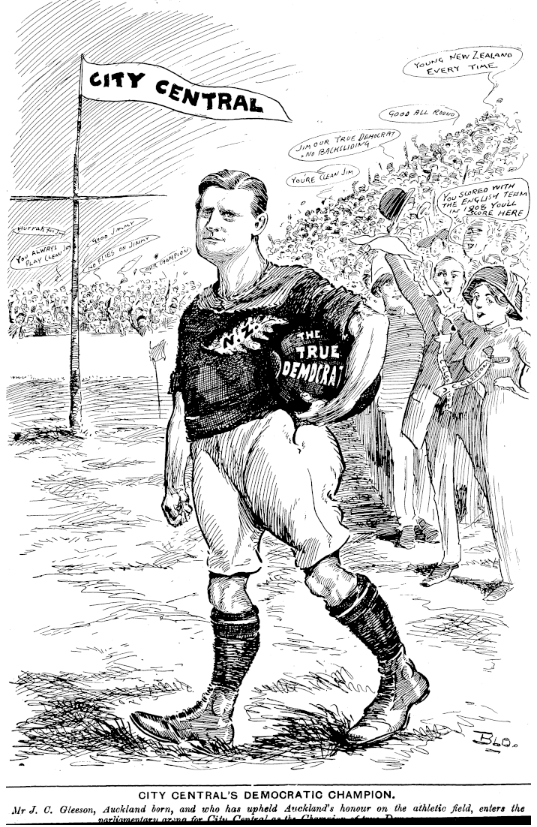
A cartoon of Gleeson when he was running for the City Central position

Gleeson owned the Windsor Wastle Hotel in Parnell and Prince Arthur Hotel in Wellesley Street along with his father Paddy. Jim Gleeson was also elected on to Auckland Council in the 1910s. Paddy died in 1916 in Parnell. Later Jim became interested in horse racing and owned several horses in the 1920s. Jim Gleeson died on 21 November 1947, and was buried at Hillsborough Cemetery in Auckland. He had moved to Auckland and lived in Parnell in the 1910s and later in Ōtāhuhu. His mother Margaret died in 1929. Jim married Phyllis Erema Harding who was 22 years younger. They had two children, Barry Holmes Gleeson (1928-1985), and Pauline Ann Gleeson (1930-2021).
