= Edgar Wrigley =

New Zealand international dual-code rugby footballer (1886–1958)

Personal information
- Born: 15 June 1886 Masterton, New Zealand
- Died: 2 June 1958 (aged 71) Huddersfield, England

Playing information
- Height: 175 cm (5 ft 9 in)
- Weight: 89 kg (14 st 0 lb)

Rugby union
- Position: Second five-eighth
Club
Years	Team	Pld	T	G	FG	P
1903–07	Wairarapa	18
Representative
Years	Team	Pld	T	G	FG	P
1905–05	New Zealand	1	1	0	0	3

Rugby league
- Position: Wing, Centre, Stand-off
Club
Years	Team	Pld	T	G	FG	P
	Runcorn
1908–13	Huddersfield	169	84	162		576
1914–20	Hunslet	27	4	5	0	22
	Total	196	88	167	0	598
Representative
Years	Team	Pld	T	G	FG	P
1907–08	New Zealand	8	0	10	0	20

Coaching information
Club
Years	Team	Gms	W	D	L	W%
1927–31	Hull F.C.
	Bradford Northern
	Total	0	0	0	0

Edgar Wrigley (15 June 1886 – 2 June 1958) was a New Zealand rugby footballer who represented New Zealand in both rugby union and rugby league.

== Early years ==
Wrigley was born in Masterton, New Zealand, to Edmund & Betsy Hannah Wrigley and was a plumber by trade. He had five siblings, sisters Bertha, Charlotte & Alice and brothers Harry and Tom.

== Rugby union career ==
Wrigley played rugby union for the Red Star club in Masterton and between 1903 and 1907 he played 18 games for Wairarapa. His brothers, Harry and Tom, also represented the Union.

When Wrigley made his All Blacks début in 1905 he was only 19 years 79 days of age and was the youngest person to play a test for the All Blacks. This record stood until 1994, when it was broken by Jonah Lomu.

== Rugby league playing career ==
Wrigley was selected to be part of the professional All Blacks 1907-1908 tour of Australia and Great Britain. He played in eight tests for the Kiwis and was noted for his goal kicking abilities.

Following the tour Wrigley returned to Britain for a full-time professional career, signed with Runcorn for £400 and a guarantee of employment as a plumber. He later moved to Huddersfield, making 169 appearances for the club, before joining Hunslet for a fee of £550. He went to war and after returning played 7 games for Hunslet in the 1920-21 season before retiring.

=== County Cup Final appearances ===
Wrigley played stand-off, and scored a try, and a conversion in Huddersfield's 21–0 victory over Batley in the 1909 Yorkshire Cup Final during the 1909–10 season at Headingley, Leeds on Saturday 27 November 1909, played at centre, and scored a conversion in the 2–8 defeat by Wakefield Trinity in the 1910 Yorkshire Cup final during the 1910–11 season at Headingley, Leeds on Saturday 3 December 1910, and played stand-off, and scored a try in the 22–10 victory over Hull Kingston Rovers in the 1911 Yorkshire Cup final during the 1911–12 season at Belle Vue, Wakefield on Saturday 25 November 1911.

== Rugby league coaching career ==
He later coached Hull FC, and Bradford Northern.

=== County Cup Final appearances ===
Wrigley was the coach in Hull's 2–8 defeat by Dewsbury in the 1927 Yorkshire Cup Final during the 1927–28 season at Headingley, Leeds on Saturday 26 November 1927.
