= Massa Johnston =

NZ dual-code international rugby footballer

Personal information
- Full name: William Johnston
- Born: 13 September 1881 Dunedin, Otago, New Zealand
- Died: 9 January 1951 (aged 69) Sydney, Australia

Playing information
- Height: 183 cm (6 ft 0 in)
- Weight: 85 kg (13 st 5 lb)

Rugby union
- Position: Back row, Lock
Club
Years	Team	Pld	T	G	FG	P
1902	Alhambra	1
Representative
Years	Team	Pld	T	G	FG	P
1903–04	Otago	6
1904–07	South Island	3
1905–07	New Zealand	3	4	0	0	12

Rugby league
- Position: Second-row
Club
Years	Team	Pld	T	G	FG	P
1908–10	Wigan	39	15	0	0	45
1910–12	Warrington	38	8	0	0	24
1920	Grafton Athletic	1	0	0	0	0
	Total	78	23	0	0	69
Representative
Years	Team	Pld	T	G	FG	P
1907–08	New Zealand	41	9	1	0	29

William "Massa" Johnston (13 September 1881 – 9 January 1951) was a New Zealand rugby union and rugby league international. He was part of the 1905 Original All Blacks tour and the professional 1907-1908 New Zealand rugby tour of Great Britain.

== Early years ==
Johnston was an iron worker by trade.

== Rugby Football ==
According to the book "All Blacks to All Golds" Johnston first played senior rugby union for the Alhambra club in 1897, aged only 15. Though this claim is an error as he was playing in the Alhambra second grade team in 1902 and was selected for the Otago Junior representative side later that season to play against Canterbury juniors on 30 August. The "W Johnston" playing in 1897 was noted to be an older veteran player and was in fact his cousin. Johnston made his senior debut for Alhambra on 31 May 1902 against Southern and played well with the link to his older cousin noted in an article in the Otago Witness. He began playing for the senior side regularly in 1903 with an article following a preseason game saying "W. Johnston, a junior forward, who played in the Alhambra ranks on Saturday is a fine stamp of a player, who should find a place in the first this year". He made his full representative début for Otago in 1903 and represented Otago again in 1904, playing in six matches in total. In 1904 he was the first player sent off in a Ranfurly Shield match as Otago went down to Wellington. He played for the South Island in 1904, 1905 and 1907.

Johnston was first chosen for the All Blacks as part of their first tour of Great Britain. This team became known as the "Originals" and was hugely successful. However, Johnston was sickly on the tour and played in only thirteen matches, missing all of the test matches. Johnston returned to the All Blacks for their 1907 tests against Australia, playing in all three matches in the series.

== Rugby League ==
Johnston joined the professional All Blacks in their 1907–08 tour of Australia and Great Britain, returning to the two countries he had played in as an All Black. At the time of the tour Johnston was at the peak of his career and had earned respect as a forward with a clean style of play. Johnston had helped select the side and was part of the Management committee while on tour. Along with Wright, Johnston was in charge of coaching the forwards while on tour. He was also an integral part of the forward pack and played in all eight test matches. He scored tries in the second and third tests against the Northern Union but was then wrongly sent off in the first test match against Australia. However, he returned to play in the second and third test matches. In all games on tour, Johnston scored a total of five tries.

After returning to New Zealand with the touring party, Johnston then returned to Great Britain, signing with the Wigan club. In Wigan he helped the club win the Championship. Massa Johnston played at prop, and scored a try in Wigan's 10–9 victory over Oldham in the 1908 Lancashire Cup Final during the 1908–09 season at Wheater's Field, Broughton, on Saturday 19 December 1908. In mid December 1910 he moved to Warrington, he was Warrington's first player from New Zealand, and as of 2016, he is the only former All Black to play for Warrington. After the war he returned to Dunedin but moved to Auckland to played rugby league and appeared in one match for Grafton Athletic.

== Later years ==
After retirement Johnston moved to Australia where he was a commissionaire at the Royal Sydney Agricultural Showgrounds. He died 9 January 1951 in Sydney.
