= Charlie Pearce =

New Zealand rugby league coach and former international rugby league footballer

Personal information
- Full name: Charles James Pearce
- Born: 22 January 1881; Christchurch, New Zealand
- Died: 2 January 1929 (aged 47); Abbatoirs, Stockburn, Christchurch, New Zealand

Playing information
- Height: 5 ft 10 in (1.78 m)
- Weight: 91 kg (14 st 5 lb)

Rugby union
- Position: Back row
Club
Years	Team	Pld	T	G	FG	P
1903–06	Canterbury

Rugby league
- Position: Second-row, Hooker
Club
Years	Team	Pld	T	G	FG	P
1913	Addington	13	1	0	0	3
Representative
Years	Team	Pld	T	G	FG	P
1907–13	New Zealand	46(8)	0	0	0	0
1908	Wellington	1	0	0	0	0
1912–13	Canterbury	4	0	0	0	0
1913	Canterbury Trial	2	0	0	0	0

Coaching information
Representative
Years	Team	Gms	W	D	L	W%
1925	New Zealand	14	6	0	8	43

Charlie James Pearce was a New Zealand rugby footballer who was part of the professional 1907-1908 New Zealand rugby tour of Great Britain.

== Early life ==
Charlie Pearce was born on 28 January 1881. His parents were Charles Julius Pearce (1858-1918) and Catherine McKinnon (1854-1935).

== Rugby union career ==
Pearce originally played rugby union for the Christchurch Albion and represented Canterbury between 1903 and 1906. In 1906 Pearce was also selected for the South Island team. He was a butcher by trade.

== Rugby league career ==
Like Albion teammates, Joseph Lavery and Hubert Turtill, Pearce was selected for the professional All Blacks 1907-1908 tour of Australia and Great Britain. All the members of the touring party received a life ban from the New Zealand Rugby Union.

Pearce played in several test matches while on tour, including the first ever rugby league test match on 1 January 1908, and captained the side in the third test match against Australia. Pearce's versatility was put to good use during the tour and he played everywhere in the pack, including hooker, and even played a match at centre. He played in the first ever trans-Tasman test which was the debut match of the Australia national rugby league team. In 1908 he played a match for Wellington against Auckland at Victoria Park on August 22. Wellington lost the match 16-14. He was chosen for the return match at the Petone Recreation Ground on September 12 but chose to stand down along with other senior players in order to give others a chance to play the fledgling code.

After the tour Pearce remained in New Zealand and went on to captain the Canterbury rugby league team. He was selected as captain to tour Australia in 1913 but was unable to attend for business reasons. He did however play for New Zealand later in the year in both matches against the touring New South Wales side. He played in a total of eight test matches. He played for and captained Addington in the Canterbury Rugby League competition in 1913. He made 4 appearances for Canterbury (one in 1912 and three in 1913) and was captain of the side.

Pearce later served as a selector for the New Zealand side and was appointed the second official "coach" of the New Zealand team, during the 1925 season. He was made a life member of the New Zealand Rugby League in 1920.

== Working life and death ==
Pearce was a butcher by trade. He had worked years earlier with his father as a contractor at the Christchurch Abattoir, and was later "engaged in farming operations in the Argentine". He had also recently worked "as a foreman butcher at the Westfield Freezing Works, near Auckland".

He died on 2 January 1929, aged 47, after falling ill while at work. He had been seeing a doctor with a heart ailment previously. He had a seizure later in the day and died before medical assistance could arrive. He left between a wife (Mary Adelina Pearce (nee. Rew) and three young children (Joan Mary Pearce, James Allan Pearce and one other).
