= Daniel Gilchrist =

New Zealand rugby footballer (1882–1964)

Dan Gilchrist
Personal information
- Full name: Daniel Gilchrist
- Born: 6 February 1882 Dunedin, New Zealand
- Died: 15 December 1964 (aged 82) Wellington, New Zealand

Playing information
- Height: 5 ft 11 in (1.80 m)
- Weight: 13 st 10 lb (87 kg)

Rugby union
- Position: Prop, Back row
Club
Years	Team	Pld	T	G	FG	P
1904–07	Melrose	41	8	2	2	36
1907	Wellington Naval	2	1	1	0	6
	Total	43	9	3	2	42
Representative
Years	Team	Pld	T	G	FG	P
1903	Wellington Juniors	4	1	0	0	3
1904–07	Wellington	7	1	0	0	3
1905	Wellington B	1	0	0	0	0
1907	Wellington Province	1	0	0	0	0

Rugby league
- Position: Prop, Loose forward
Representative
Years	Team	Pld	T	G	FG	P
1907–08	New Zealand	31	0	0	0	0
1908	A Team (Exhibition)	1	0	0	0	0
1908	Wellington	2	0	0	0	0

Daniel Gilchrist (1882–1964) was a New Zealand rugby footballer who was part of the professional 1907-1908 New Zealand rugby tour of Great Britain.

== Early years ==
Daniel Gilchrist was born in 1882 to Margaret Ann Strain Gilchrist and John Henderson Gilchrist. He was the eldest of 6 children with his younger siblings; Matilda (b.1884), Margaret (b.1886), John (b.1887), William (b.1890), and Alexander (b.1892). Gilchrist was a plumber by trade.

== Rugby Football ==
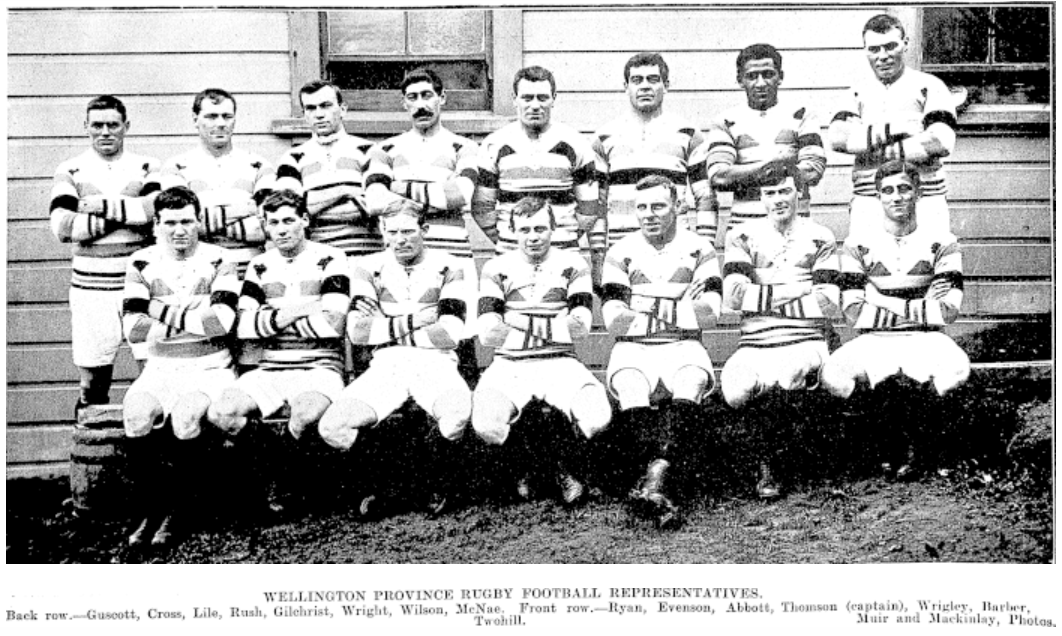

Gilchrist played rugby union for the Melrose Club senior side in 1904 and represented Wellington consistently from 1904 to 1907. His debut match for Wellington was against Wairarapa on 4 June 1904 and he played in one further match that season against Buller on 13 August. Gilchrist was part of the Wellington squad that won the Ranfurly Shield against Auckland in 1904 on their Northern Tour. He had played in the match 4 days earlier against Hawke's Bay on 2 August but was not in the match day team for the shield challenge. In 1906 he was elected on to the management committee of the Melrose club and again in 1907.

== Rugby League ==
Despite being only 23, Gilchrist was selected for the professional All Blacks in their 1907–08 tour of Great Britain and Australia. Like all members of the tour, Gilchrist subsequently received a life ban from the New Zealand Rugby Union. He played in the first ever trans-Tasman test which was the debut match of the Australia national rugby league team. Altogether, Gilchrist played in six test matches while on tour.

On his return to New Zealand, Gilchrist continued playing rugby league, representing Wellington.

Despite his life ban when he returned from the tour his Melrose club held an evening for him at the Mawson's Rooms on Cuba Street to celebrate his return and efforts for the club in the previous season. He was also adjudged the best forward in the senior side in the 1907 season. After his return he applied for reinstatement to rugby under the grounds that he was not a member of any club at the time of his suspension and therefore not under the jurisdiction of the union. The rugby union refused the application. Instead Gilchrist was selected for a 'northern tour' by a Wellington side to play against Auckland in the following weeks.

In 1908 he was the coach of the Melrose rugby club side despite not being allowed to play rugby.

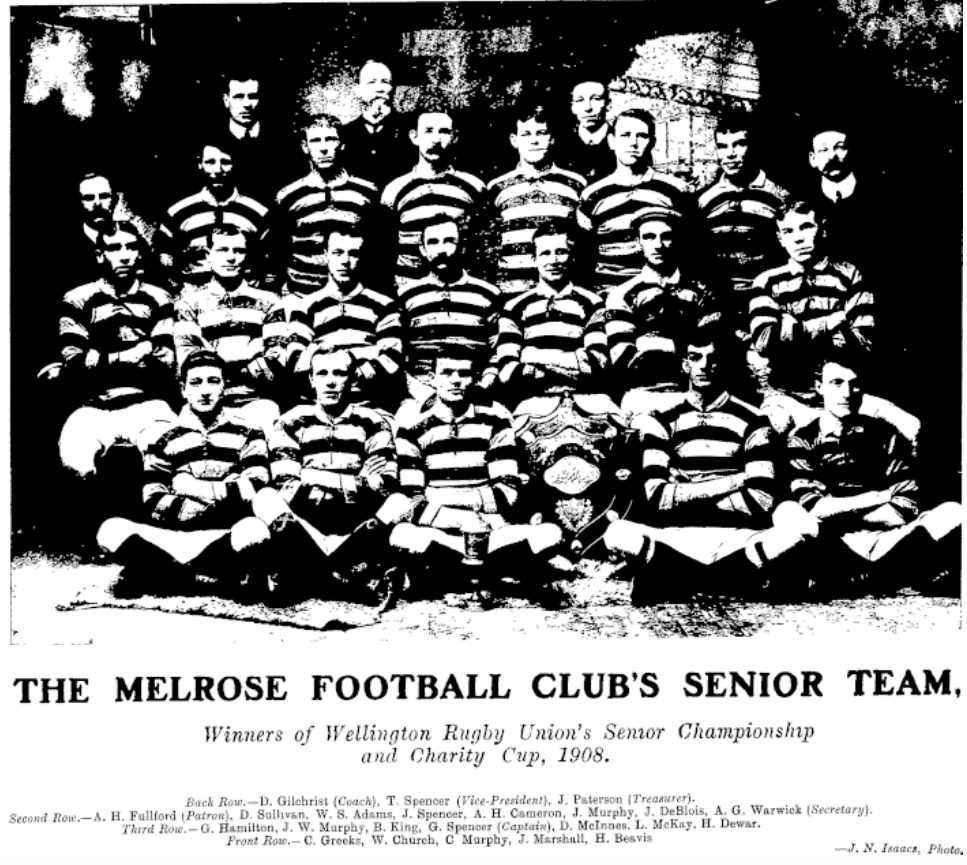

In 1909 he was selected for the New Zealand tour of Australia but was unable to go.
