= Conrad Byrne =

New Zealand rugby league footballer

Con Byrne
Personal information
- Full name: Conrad Augustus Byrne
- Born: 17 May 1884 Takaka, Nelson, New Zealand
- Died: 30 April 1931 (aged 47) Takaka, Nelson, New Zealand

Playing information
- Height: 180 cm (5 ft 11 in)
- Weight: 90.3 kg (14 st 3 lb)

Rugby union
- Position: Prop, Hooker, Three-quarters, forward
Club
Years	Team	Pld	T	G	FG	P
1905	Takaka	1	0	2	1	9
1906–07	Petone	17	5	0	0	15
	Total	18	5	2	1	24
Representative
Years	Team	Pld	T	G	FG	P
1902–04	Golden Bay	3	0	0	0	0
1906–07	Wellington	5	1	0	0	3
1907	Wellington Province	1	0	0	0	0

Rugby league
- Position: Forward
Club
Years	Team	Pld	T	G	FG	P
1910	North Sydney	6	0	6	0	12
1910–12	Huddersfield	72	12	5	0	46
1913	Takaka	1	0	0	0	0
1913	Petone	1	0	0	0	0
	Total	80	12	11	0	58
Representative
Years	Team	Pld	T	G	FG	P
1907–13	New Zealand	33	4	11	0	34
1908	Wellington	1	1	0	0	3

Conrad "Con" Augustus Byrne was a New Zealand rugby footballer who was part of the professional 1907–1908 New Zealand rugby tour of Great Britain.

== Early years ==
Originally from Nelson, Byrne was a farmer by trade. He moved to Wellington in 1906 and joined the Petone club where he impressed in the club competition almost immediately. Byrne was subsequently selected for Wellington and made his debut against Canterbury on 18 August, when he scored a try and was part of the side that won the Ranfurly Shield. He played on 4 matches that season against Canterbury, Southland, Wanganui, and Auckland.

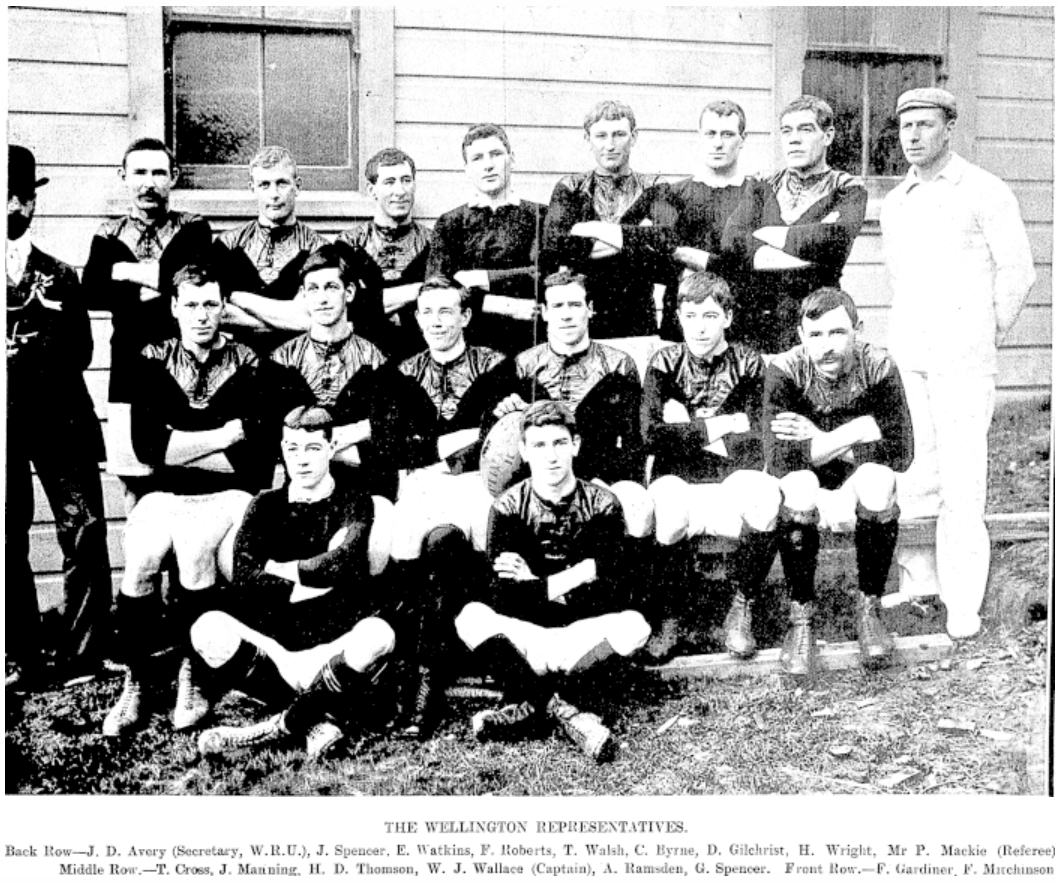
Wellington rugby team in 1906; Byrne is 4th from the right in the back row

== Rugby league career ==
Byrne was selected for the professional All Blacks in their 1907–1908 tour of Great Britain and Australia. Like all players on the tour he immediately received a life ban from the New Zealand Rugby Union. On the tour's return leg Byrne played in the first ever trans-Tasman test which was the début match of the Australia national rugby league team. In the second test against Australia Byrne captained the side to a 24–12 victory that clinched the series. Byrne played in three test matches while on the tour.

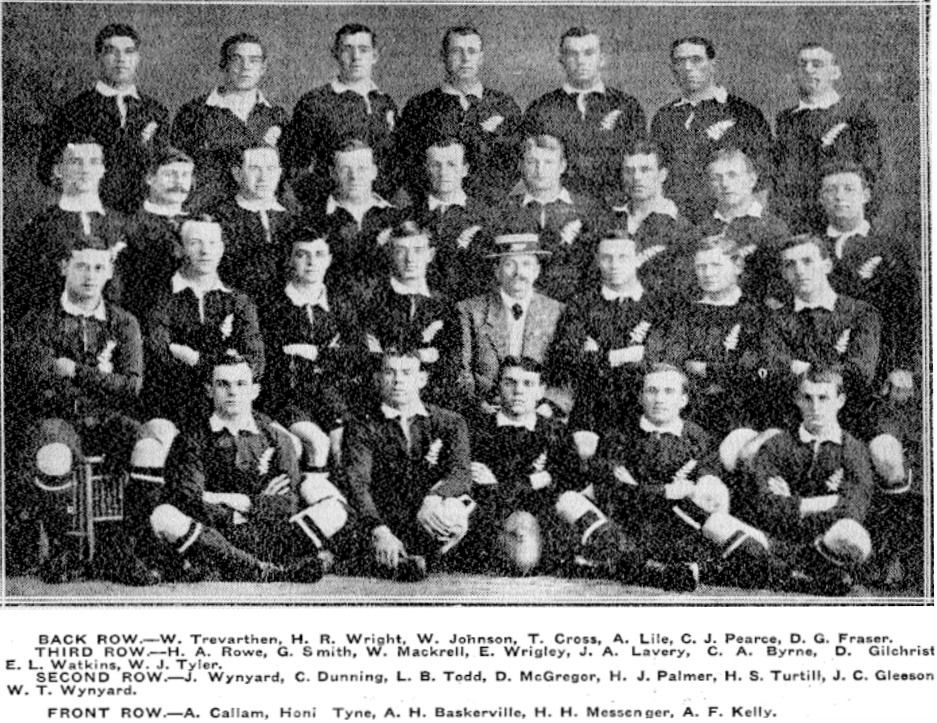
New Zealand Rugby League Team of 1907–08 to Tour England

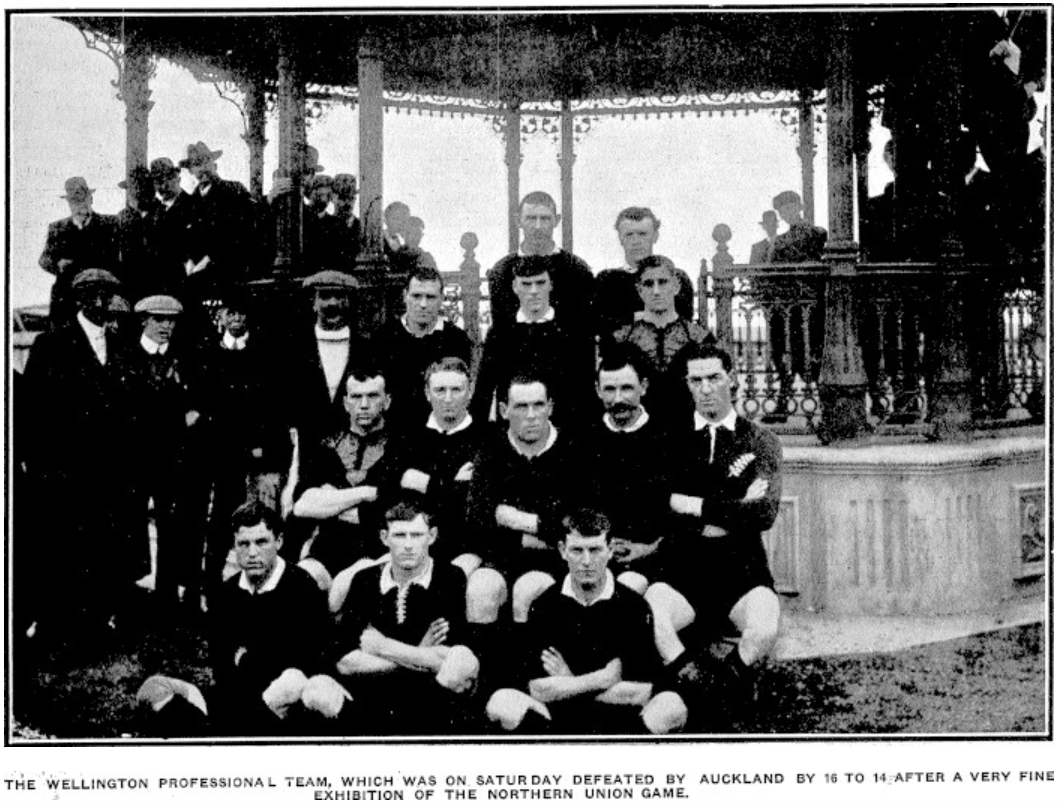
The Wellington team

In 1908 and 1909 Byrne played for Wellington, including in matches against Auckland and Taranaki. Against Auckland in a match on 22 August 1908 at Victoria Park in Auckland he scored their first try in a 16-14 loss. In 1909 Byrne again toured Australia with the New Zealand side, captaining the side in all three test matches.

In 1910 Byrne joined the North Sydney club in the NSWRL Premiership and later moved to Huddersfield for two seasons, as a forward.

During the 1910–11 Northern Rugby Football Union season Byrne played as a forward in Huddersfield's 8–2 loss against Wakefield Trinity in the 1910 Yorkshire Cup Final at Headingley Stadium on Saturday 3 December 1910.

By 1913 Byrne had returned to New Zealand and was selected to be part of the tour of Australia, playing in his seventh and final test match. He contracted a bad cold on the tour which limited his playing time to just the 1 match. He had played 1 match for the Takaka club on 10 May against Nelson before his selection for the tour and then 1 match for Petone on 24 May against Athletic prior to the departure of the New Zealand team. Following the tour it appears that he stopped playing, aged 29.

== Legacy ==
Byrne was named in the second-row in the Petone Panthers' Team of the Century in 2012.
