= Percy Eccles =

GB & England international rugby league & soccer footballer

Personal information
- Full name: Arthur Percy Eccles
- Born: 9 August 1883 Halifax, England
- Died: 4 October 1955 (aged 72) Halifax, England

Playing information
- Position: Wing
Club
Years	Team	Pld	T	G	FG	P
1906–13	Halifax	145	91	15	2	307
Representative
Years	Team	Pld	T	G	FG	P
1908	England	1	1	0	0	3
1908	Great Britain	1	1	0	0	3
Association football career
Senior career*
Years	Team	Apps	(Gls)
1908–09	Bradford	1	(0)
- * Club domestic league appearances and goals

Arthur Percy Eccles (9 August 1883 – 4 October 1955) was a professional rugby league and association footballer who played in the 1900s. He played at representative level for Great Britain and England, and at club level for Halifax, as a wing. He also played one season of association football for Bradford.

== Playing career ==
=== Rugby league ===
Eccles was the league's top try-scorer in the 1906–07 season with 41-tries.

Eccles won a cap for England while at Halifax in 1908 against New Zealand, and won a cap for Great Britain while at Halifax in 1908 against New Zealand

=== Association football ===
He played association football for Bradford in 1908 before returning to his "first love" of rugby in 1909.

== Death ==
Eccles died in Halifax General Hospital on 4 October 1955, aged 72. His funeral took place in St Jude's Church, Halifax, and he was cremated at Scholemoor Crematorium, Bradford.
