= Jack Spencer (1900s rugby league) =

GB & England international rugby league footballer

Playing information
- Position: Forward
Club
Years	Team	Pld	T	G	FG	P
1905–09	Salford	99	6	3	0	24
Representative
Years	Team	Pld	T	G	FG	P
1908	England	1	1	0	0	3
1908	Great Britain	1	0	0	0	0

Jack Spencer was an English professional rugby league footballer who played in the 1900s. He played at representative level for Great Britain and England, and at club level for Salford, as a forward.

Spencer won a cap for England while at Salford in 1908 against Wales, and won a cap for Great Britain while at Salford in 1908 against New Zealand.
