= Jim Jolley =

English RL coach and former GB & England international rugby league footballer

James Jolley
Personal information
- Full name: James Jolley
- Born: c. 1873
- Died: 9 September 1928 (aged 52) Runcorn, Cheshire, England

Playing information
- Position: Stand-off
Club
Years	Team	Pld	T	G	FG	P
1895–1911	Runcorn RFC
1911–≥11	Leigh
	Total	0	0	0	0	0
Representative
Years	Team	Pld	T	G	FG	P
1897–1904	Cheshire	16	4	0	0	12
1906–08	Lancashire	7	0	4	0	8
1908–09	England	3	1	2	0	7
1908	Great Britain	3	1	1	0	5

Coaching information
Club
Years	Team	Gms	W	D	L	W%
c. 1910	Leigh

James "Jim"/"Jimmy" Jolley (c. 1873 – 9 September 1928) was an English professional rugby league footballer who played in the 1900s and 1910s, and coached in the 1900s and 1910s. He played at representative level for Great Britain and England, and at club level for Runcorn RFC and Leigh, as a stand-off, and coached at club level for Leigh, where he was the club's first coach.

== Rugby league career ==
=== Club career ===
Jim Jolley played for Runcorn, and achieved county honours in 1897. He was transferred to Leigh in 1911.

=== International honours ===
Jim Jolley won caps for England while at Runcorn RFC in 1908 against Wales, and in 1909 against Australia (2 matches), and won caps for Great Britain while at Runcorn RFC in 1908 against New Zealand (3 matches).

== Post-playing ==
After retirement he was licensee of the Nelson Hotel in Runcorn town centre. He died in Runcorn Cottage Hospital of "internal troubles" that had bothered him for some time. His wife predeceased him and he left two sons and four daughters. Five nephews followed him into professional rugby.
