= Frank Cheadle =

Australian rugby league footballer

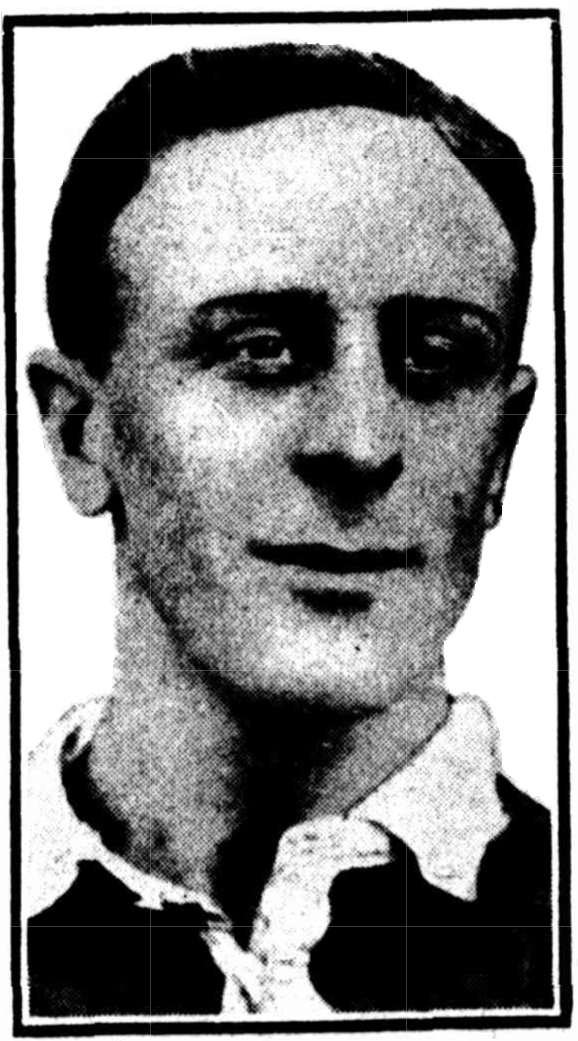
- Frank Cheadle

Personal information
- Full name: Francis Bowman Cheadle
- Born: 7 November 1885 Wollongong, New South Wales, Australia
- Died: 12 May 1916 (aged 30) Armentières, France

Playing information

Rugby union
Club
Years	Team	Pld	T	G	FG	P
	Newtown

Rugby league
- Position: Centre
Club
Years	Team	Pld	T	G	FG	P
1908–10	Newtown	17	2	8	0	22
Representative
Years	Team	Pld	T	G	FG	P
1907–08	New South Wales	4	0	0	0	0
1908–09	Australia	5	0	0	0	0

Frank Cheadle (7 November 1885 – 12 May 1916) was an Australian pioneering rugby league footballer and AIF soldier who fell in World War I. A New South Wales interstate and Australian international representative centre, he was reputedly the first Sydney rugby union player to sign with the new breakaway league in its earliest formative days in late 1907. He played for New South Wales in the first rugby match run by the newly created 'New South Wales Rugby Football League' which had just split away from the established New South Wales Rugby Football Union.

== Early life ==
Born in Wollongong, New South Wales, Cheadle's family moved to Sydney when he was young. He grew up in the inner-western suburbs of Marrickville and Stanmore and was educated at Fort Street High School. He was playing rugby union with the Newtown RUFC in 1906 and on the verge of national selection when he signed with the new rugby league code.

== Rugby league career ==
Cheadle played in the inaugural series of matches between New South Wales and Baskerville's touring "All Golds" in 1907. Part of Newtown's original rugby league team of 1908, he debuted for Australia in the inaugural Tests in early 1908 against those same New Zealanders on the homeward leg of their trip to England and back. Cheadle is listed on the Australian Player Register as kangaroo No. 2'. He was selected in the inaugural Kangaroo tour of 1908-09 but took part in only seven tour matches and no Tests. His final Test appearance was against New Zealand in 1909 in Australia and by the end of 1910 his club career was also over.

Cheadle was awarded Life Membership of the New South Wales Rugby League in 1914.

== War service ==
Cheadle joined the AIF on 4 January 1915 enlisting as a Regimental Quartermaster Sergeant and left Sydney on board HMAT A32 Themistocles on 12 May 1915 as a member the 17th Battalion, 5th Brigade, 2nd Division.

His battalion arrived at Gallipoli in August 1915 to relieve the 1st Division who had been there since April. Cheadle was transferred to the 18th Battalion and promoted to Lieutenant on 1 October 1915. He was evacuated with the 18th Battalion in the December winter, regrouped in Egypt and reached France in March 1916 seeing front line action in the trenches near Armentières.

Cheadle was shot through the head shortly after his battalion moved into the trenches and he died of wounds on 12 May in the 7th Australian Field Ambulance. Charles Bean, the Australian war historian, wrote that "Lieutenant Cheadle of the 18th Battalion, when boldly scouting with the moon nearing the full, was seen by the enemy, fired on and fatally wounded as the patrol withdrew over the parapet". He is buried in the Erquinghem-Lys Churchyard, 1.2 km west of Armentières.
