= Llewellyn Treharne =

Wales international rugby league & union footballer

Personal information
- Full name: Llewellyn Treharne
- Born: Wales
- Died: unknown

Playing information

Rugby union
Club
Years	Team	Pld	T	G	FG	P
≤1904–04	Penygraig RFC

Rugby league
- Position: Wing, Centre
Club
Years	Team	Pld	T	G	FG	P
1904–08	Wigan	47	25	1		77
Representative
Years	Team	Pld	T	G	FG	P
1908	Wales	2

Llewellyn "Llew" Treharne (birth unknown – death unknown) was a Welsh rugby union and professional rugby league footballer who played in the 1900s. He played club level rugby union (RU) for Penygraig RFC, and representative level rugby league (RL) for Wales, and at club level for Wigan, as a wing or centre.

== International honours ==
Llew Treharne won caps for Wales while at Wigan 1908 2-caps.

== Club career ==
During Llewellyn Treharne's time at Wigan, they won the South West Lancashire League in 1904–05 and 1905–06.
