= Hubert Turtill =

New Zealand rugby union player and rugby league footballer

Jum Turtill
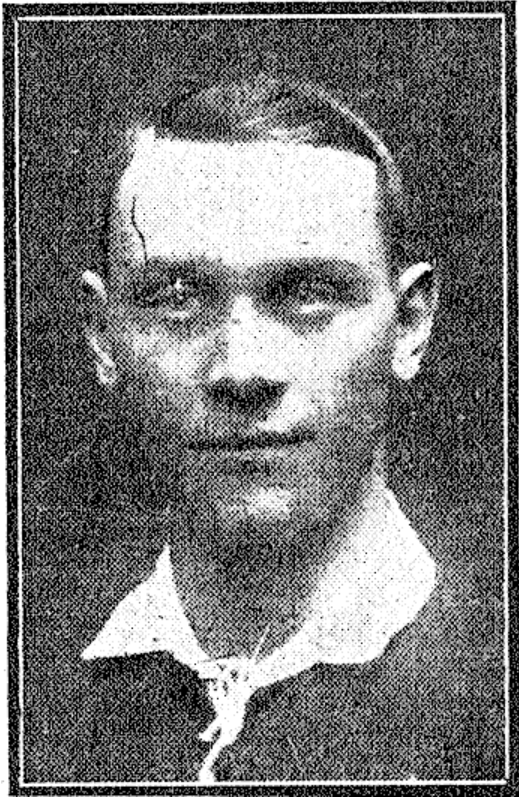

Personal information
- Full name: Hubert Sydney Turtill
- Born: 1 February 1880 London, England
- Died: 9 April 1918 (aged 38) France

Playing information
- Height: 5 ft 9 in (1.75 m)
- Weight: 72 kg (11 st 5 lb)

Rugby union
- Position: Fullback
Club
Years	Team	Pld	T	G	FG	P
1902–06	Canterbury
Representative
Years	Team	Pld	T	G	FG	P
1905	New Zealand	1	0	0	0	0

Rugby league
- Position: Fullback
Club
Years	Team	Pld	T	G	FG	P
1909–13	St. Helens	137	3	197	0	403
Representative
Years	Team	Pld	T	G	FG	P
1907–08	New Zealand	31 (6)	4 (1)	(1)	0	14 (5)
- Military career
- Allegiance: United Kingdom
- Branch: British Army
- Service years: 1914-18
- Rank: Sergeant
- Unit: Royal Engineers
- Conflicts: World War I; Western Front †

"Jum" Hubert Sydney Turtill (1 February 1880 – 9 April 1918) was a New Zealand dual-code footballer, playing rugby union and then rugby league for New Zealand. After emigrating to Britain, he served in the British Army during the First World War, and was killed while serving in 1918.

== Early years ==
Turtill's father died in London when he was only three years old and his mother decided to move to New Zealand to be with relatives. On the sea voyage in 1884 he gained the nickname Jum, short for Jumbo. Turtill worked in New Zealand as a decorative metal worker.

== Rugby union ==
He started his rugby union career playing for Christchurch Albion before making the Canterbury team in 1902. He represented the South Island in 1903 and 1907. He became an All Black in 1905, playing against Australia.

== Rugby league ==
In 1907 he joined the professional All Blacks – better known as the All Golds – on their tour of Great Britain and Australia, thus joining the code that would evolve into rugby league. He was selected because he was considered well versed in wet weather football, something the side would constantly experience in Great Britain. On the tour he played in six test matches. Turtill captained the side in the first ever trans-Tasman test against the Australia national rugby league team on 9 May 1908 when New Zealand won 11-10. Turtill only scored one try on tour, but it was an important one - the first by New Zealand in a test match against Great Britain at Leeds on 25 January 1908 - and helped them win the series.

Once the tour was over he returned to England with his wife, Mabel, originally intending to play for Salford. However he instead joined St. Helens where he also owned a pub, the "Lord Nelson Hotel" in St Helens.

== First World War ==
After the outbreak of the First World War, Turtill served with the British Army. He became a sergeant in the Royal Engineers 422nd Field Company, 55th West Lancashire division, until he was killed in France in 1918 during the Battle of Givenchy.

Turtill’s body was buried in a French war cemetery.

From 2022 the New Zealand Rugby Museum has displayed a tribute to Turtill, including items on loan from his family, such as his Canterbury cap, New Zealand jersey and cap and his engraved war service medallion.

== See also ==
- List of international rugby union players killed in World War I
