= Hercules Wright =

NZ international rugby league & union footballer

Personal information
- Full name: Hercules Richard Wright
- Born: 16 January 1881 Hokitika, New Zealand
- Died: 4 April 1963 (aged 82) Wellington, New Zealand

Playing information
- Height: 5 ft 11 in (1.80 m)
- Weight: 13 st 8 lb (86 kg)

Rugby union
- Position: Hooker, Prop
Club
Years	Team	Pld	T	G	FG	P
1899	North Wairarapa
	Wellington
	Total	0	0	0	0	0

Rugby league
- Position: Hooker, Prop
Representative
Years	Team	Pld	T	G	FG	P
1907–08	New Zealand	4	0	0	0	0
1908–??	Wellington

Hercules Richard "Bumper" Wright (16 January 1881 – 4 April 1963) was a New Zealand rugby footballer who was part of the professional (rugby league) 1907–1908 New Zealand rugby tour of Great Britain.

== Background ==
Born in Arahura, which is 4 miles (6.4 km) north of Hokitika in the West Coast region of New Zealand, Wright was a printer by trade.

== Rugby union career ==
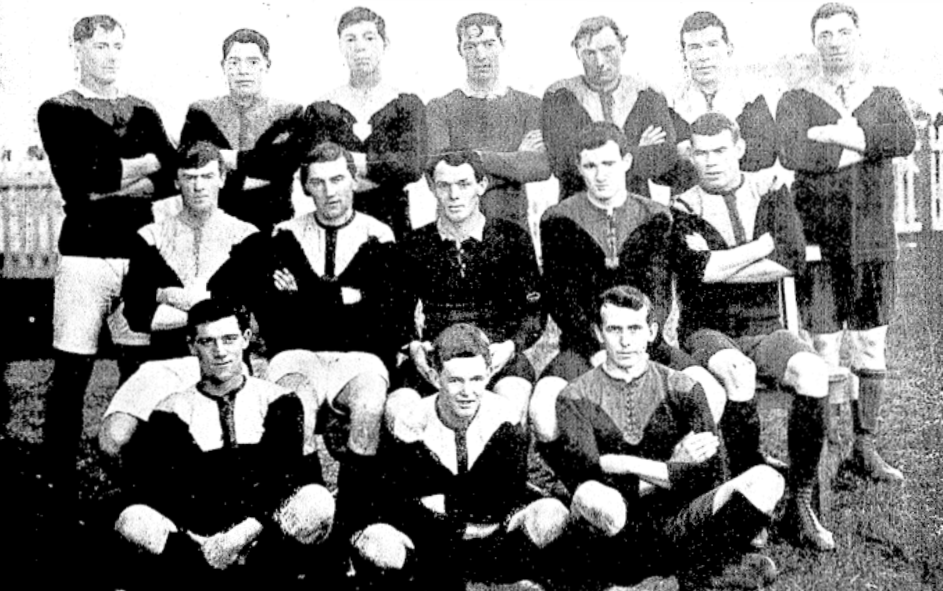
The Petone senior rugby team in 1907. Wright is second from the left in the back row, next to Tom Cross (on the left).

Wright began his rugby union career playing for North Wairarapa in 1899. He then moved to Petone where he joined the Petone Rugby Club. During the Second Boer War, Wright played for the New Zealand Army Corps team, which was the first New Zealand rugby side to play in South Africa. On his return Wright played for Wellington and played Ranfurly Shield rugby. He eventually became the captain of both Wellington and Petone. He was also selected for the All Blacks but withdrew due to injury and never represented New Zealand in rugby union. Wright was a noted disciplinarian and was known to check on his Petone teammates the night before games.

== Rugby league career ==
When news of the advent of rugby league football made its way from England to the Southern Hemisphere, Wright joined the professional All Blacks for the 1907–1908 tour of Great Britain and Australia. He was one of six players from the Petone Rugby Club selected. Wright had been one of the tour's selectors and was elected captain for the tour, a sign of the democratic nature of the touring party. As a result, he also served on the tour's Management committee. He played in the first ever trans-Tasman test which was the debut match of the Australia national rugby league team. Altogether Wright played in four test matches while on the tour. After returning to New Zealand Wright played rugby league in Wellington, representing the Wellington Rugby League in matches against Auckland in 1908 and Taranaki in 1909.

== Political career ==
Wright was on the Petone Borough Council, and on the Brooklyn school committee. His brother was Minister of Education and Mayor of Wellington, Robert Wright.

Wright died in Wellington on 4 April 1963. Along with five other members of the touring party, he was buried at Karori Cemetery.

== Legacy ==
Wright was named at Prop in the Petone Panthers' Team of the Century in 2012.
