= Callum =

- Gender: Male

Origin
- Origin: Gaelic
- Meaning: "Dove"

Callum is a Scottish Gaelic name that commemorates the Latin name Columba, meaning 'dove'. Callum was popular among early Christians because the dove was a symbol of purity, peace and the Holy Spirit. St. Columba was one of the most influential of the early Celtic saints. The name may also be spelled "Calum". Callum is a popular name, especially in Scotland where it was the 60th most popular name in 2022.

== People with the given name ==
- Callum Ah Chee (born 1997), Australian rules footballer
- Callum Ainley (born 1997), English footballer
- Callum Ball (born 1992), English footballer
- Callum Black (born 1986), American-born Irish rugby union player
- Callum Blake (born 1994), Vanuatuan cricketer
- Callum Blue (born 1977), English actor
- Callum Braley (born 1994), English rugby union player
- Callum Brittain, English footballer
- Callum Brodrick (born 1998), English cricketer
- Callum Brown (footballer, born 1998), Australian rules footballer
- Callum Brown (footballer, born 2000), Australian rules footballer
- Callum Bruce (born 1983), New Zealand rugby union player
- Callum Burton (born 1996), English footballer
- Callum Camps, English-born Northern Ireland footballer
- Callum Casey (born 1990), Irish rugby league player
- Callum Chambers (born 1979), Australian rules footballer
- Callum Chettle (born 1996), English footballer
- Callum Cockerill-Mollett (born 1999), English-born Irish footballer
- Callum Connolly (born 1997), English footballer
- Callum Cooke (born 1997), English footballer
- Callum Crane (born 1996), Scottish footballer
- Callum Crawford (born 1984), Canadian lacrosse player
- Callum Cuthbertson, Scottish actor and writer
- Callum Davidson (born 1976), Scottish footballer
- Callum Davies (disambiguation), multiple people
- Callum Dixon, English actor
- Callum Dixon (born 2000), British rower
- Callum Driver (born 1992), English footballer
- Callum Elder (born 1995), Australian soccer player
- Callum Evans (born 1995), English footballer
- Callum Ferguson (born 1984), Australian cricketer
- Callum Field (born 1997), English rugby league player
- Callum Fordyce (born 1992), Scottish footballer
- Callum Geldart (born 1991), English cricketer
- Callum Gibbins (born 1988), New Zealand rugby union player
- Callum Guest (born 1995), English cricketer
- Callum Guy (born 1996), English footballer
- Callum Harriott (born 1994), English footballer
- Callum Hart (born 1985), Welsh footballer
- Callum Hassan (born 1993), English footballer
- Callum Hawkins (born 1992), British long-distance runner
- Callum Hemming (born 1999), English badminton player
- Callum Hendry (born 1997), English footballer
- Calum Hood (born 1996), Bassist in '5 Seconds of Summer'
- Callum Hunter-Hill (born 1997), Scottish rugby union player
- Callum Ilott (born 1998), British racing driver
- Callum Innes (born 1962), Scottish painter
- Callum Irving (born 1993), Canadian soccer player
- Callum Jackson (born 1994), English cricketer
- Callum Johnson (born 1985), English boxer
- Callum Johnson (footballer) (born 1996), English footballer
- Callum Kennedy (born 1989), English footballer
- Callum Lancaster (born 1996), English rugby league player
- Callum Lang (born 1998), English footballer
- Callum Lloyd (born 1986), English footballer
- Callum MacDonald (born 1983), Scottish footballer
- Callum Macdonald (1912–1999), Scottish printer and publisher
- Callum MacLeod (born 1988), British racing driver
- Callum Macrae, Scottish filmmaker, writer and journalist
- Callum Makin (born 2003), English boxer
- Callum Maycock (born 1997), English footballer
- Callum McCaig (born 1995), Scottish politician
- Callum McCarthy (born 1944), British banker
- Callum McFadzean (born 1994), Scottish footballer
- Callum McGregor (born 1993), Scottish footballer
- Callum McManaman (born 1991), English footballer
- Callum McNaughton (born 1991), English footballer
- Callum McNish (born 1992), English footballer
- Callum Mills (born 1997), Australian rules footballer
- Callum Milne (born 1965), Scottish footballer
- Callum Moore (born 1996), Australian rules footballer
- Callum Morris (born 1990), English footballer
- Callum O'Dowda (born 1995), Republic of Ireland footballer
- Callum O'Hare (born 1998), English footballer
- Callum Parkinson (born 1996), English cricketer
- Callum Paterson (born 1994), Scottish footballer
- Callum Phillips (born 1992), English rugby league player
- Callum Priestley (born 1989), English hurdler
- Callum Preston (born 1995), English footballer
- Callum Reid (born 1992), Scottish rugby union player
- Callum Reidford (born 1987), Scottish footballer
- Callum Reilly (footballer) (born 1993), English footballer
- Callum Keith Rennie (born 1960), British-born Canadian actor
- Callum Roberts, British oceanographer
- Callum Robertson (born 1996), Scottish footballer
- Callum Robinson (born 1995), English footballer
- Callum Ross (born 1994), English footballer
- Callum Russell (born 1996), British Para-cyclist
- Callum Rzonca (born 1997), English footballer
- Callum Saunders (born 1995), Welsh footballer
- Callum Scotson (born 1996), Australian cyclist
- Callum Shinkwin (born 1993), English golfer
- Callum Sinclair (born 1989), Australian Rules footballer
- Callum Skinner (born 1992), British cyclist
- Callum Smith (disambiguation), multiple people
- Callum Styles (born 2000), English footballer
- Callum Tapping (born 1993), Scottish footballer
- Callum Taylor (born 1997), English cricketer
- Callum Templeton (born 1993), Scottish rugby union player
- Callum Thorp (born 1975), Australian cricketer
- Callum Timmins (born 1999), Australian soccer player
- Callum Turner (born 1990), English actor and model
- Callum Urch (born 1984), Australian rules footballer
- Callum Morris (Born 1986), Footballer
- Callum Voisin (born 2006), British racing driver
- Callum Warburton (born 1989), English footballer
- Callum Watson (born 1989), Australian cross-country skier
- Callum Wilkinson (born 1997), English racewalker
- Callum Wilson (disambiguation), multiple people

== People with the surname ==
- Agnes Kane Callum (1925–2015), American genealogist
- Arthur Callum (1877–1961), New Zealand rugby league player
- Ian Callum (born 1955), British car designer
- Jeannie Callum, Canadian transfusion specialist
- Moray Callum (born 1958), British car designer

== Fictional characters ==
- Callum Clockwise, in the video game Rascal
- Callum Jones, in the television series Neighbours
- Callum Kane, in the television series Hollyoaks
- Callum Logan, in the television series Coronation Street
- Callum Lynch, in the film Assassin's Creed
- Callum Mcgregor, from the Noughts & Crosses novels
- PC Callum McIntyre, in the television series Monarch of the Glen
- Callum McKay, in the television series Shortland Street
- Callum Highway, in the television series EastEnders
- Callum Hunt, from The Magisterium Series novels
- Callum Monks, in the television series EastEnders
- Callum Rennie, in the television series Emmerdale
- Callum Stone, in the television series The Bill
- Prince Callum, in the television series The Dragon Prince
- Dick and Dorothea Callum, in Arthur Ransome's Swallows and Amazons books

== See also ==
- Callumn Morrison (born 1999), Scottish footballer
- Calum
- Colum (disambiguation)
- Colm
- Colon (disambiguation)
