= Colom =

Colom may refer to:

== People ==
- Colom (surname)
- Colom Keating, American actor and writer

== Places ==
- Colom Island, Spain
- Passeig de Colom, Barcelona
- Roca Colom, mountain of Catalonia

== See also ==
- Colm
- Colomb
- Colomba
- Colombe (disambiguation)
- Colum (disambiguation)
- Callum (disambiguation)
- Colon (disambiguation)
- Colón (disambiguation)
