= Geldart =

- Pronunciation: /ɡɛldɑːrt/
- Language: English

Origin
- Derivation: Potentially gelding
- Region of origin: England

Geldart is a surname. Its origin has been potentially tied to the surname "Geldherd" from the 13th century, and may be related to gelding. and may refer to:

- Callum Geldart (born 1991), English cricketer
- Clarence Geldart (1867–1935), American film actor
- Gary Geldart (born 1950), American ice hockey player
- James Geldart (1785–1876), English cleric and academic
- Stanley Geldart (1919–1983), Canadian politician
- Tom Geldart (1905–1985), English footballer
- William Martin Geldart (1870–1922), British jurist
