= Colum =

Colum may refer to:

== People ==
=== Given name ===
- Colum Corless (1922–2015), Irish hurler
- Lord Colum Crichton-Stuart (1886–1957), British Conservative Party politician
- Colum Eastwood (born 1983), Irish nationalist politician
- Colum Halpenny (born 1979), Australian rugby league player
- Colum Kenny (active from 1992), Irish author and academic
- Colum McCann (born 1965), Irish writer of literary fiction
- Colum Sands (born 1951), Irish singer-songwriter
- William St Colum Bland (1868–1950), British Army officer

=== Surname ===
- Mary Colum (1884–1957), Irish literary critic and author
- Padraic Colum (1881–1972), a leading figure of the Irish Literary Revival

== Other uses ==
- St. Colum's GAA, a sports club in County Cork, Ireland
- Colum, the trade name of Mepenzolate

== See also ==
- Colin (given name)
- Colm, an Irish given name
- Colom (disambiguation)
- Column
