= Callum (disambiguation) =

Callum is a Scottish given name and surname.

Callum may also refer to:

- Callum (Thrace), a settlement and station (mutatio) of ancient Thrace, inhabited during Byzantine times. Its site is located east of Selymbria in European Turkey.
- Callum, Ontario, Canada
- Callum (bivalve), a part of certain bivalve seashells

== See also ==
- Calum, orthographic variant of the name
- Callum Brae, a suburb in Hamilton, New Zealand
