= Colm =

- Pronunciation: /ˈkɒləm, ˈkʌ-/ Irish: [ˈkɔlˠəmˠ]
- Gender: masculine
- Language: Irish

Origin
- Derivation: Latin: columba "dove"
- Meaning: Dove

Other names
- Variant forms: Colum, Colom
- Related names: Colman, Columb, Columbanus, Callum

Colm (/ˈkɒləm, ˈkʌ-/; Irish: [ˈkɔlˠəmˠ]) is a masculine (and, on rare occasions, a feminine) given name of Irish and Latin origin. It is not an Irish version of Colin, but like Callum and Malcolm derives from a Gaelic variation on columba, the Latin word for "dove". The reason for the name's use for over a thousand years in Ireland and Scotland is out of respect for St Colmcille of Iona who was from a royal family in the north of Ireland and who evangelized the Scots. Malcolm translates as "Servant of St Columbcille." And the association with the word Dove also has religious origins with the dove being a symbol of the Holy Ghost.

== People ==
- Colm Bairéad (born 1981), Irish filmmaker
- Colm Brogan (1902–1977), Scottish writer
- Colm Byrne (born 1971), Irish playwright
- Colm Collins, Gaelic football manager
- Colm Condon (1921–2008), Irish lawyer
- Colm Connolly (born 1964), American judge
- Colm Connolly (journalist) (1942–2025), Irish journalist, newsreader, broadcaster, and author
- Colm Cooper (born 1983), Irish Gaelic football player
- Colm Coyle (born 1963), Irish Gaelic football player and manager
- Colm Feore (born 1958), American-born Canadian actor
- Colm Hilliard (1936–2002), Irish politician
- Colm Imbert (born 1957), Trinidad and Tobago politician
- Colm Keegan (born 1989), Irish singer, songwriter, and teacher
- Colm Magner (born 1961), Canadian actor
- Colm Mangan (born 1942), Irish general
- Colm Meaney (born 1953), Irish actor
- Colm Mulcahy (born 1958), Irish mathematician, academic, columnist and author
- Colm Ó Cíosóig (born 1964), Irish drummer
- Colm O'Gorman (born 1966), Irish activist
- Colm Ó hEocha (1926–1997), Irish scientist
- Colm Ó Maonlaí (born 1966), Irish actor
- Colm O'Shaughnessy (born 1996), Irish Gaelic football player and rugby player
- Colm Tóibín (born 1955), Irish novelist
- Colm Doolan (born 1991), Irish Endurance Athlete
- Colm Vance (born 1992), Canadian soccer player
- Colm Wilkinson (born 1944), Irish actor and singer
- Colm O'Rourke (born 1957), Irish Gaelic football player and manager

== Fictional characters ==
- Colm, in the video game Fire Emblem: The Sacred Stones
- Colm O'Driscoll, one of the antagonists in the video game Red Dead Redemption 2
- Uncle Colm McCool, from the Channel 4 sitcom Derry Girls
- Col. Colm Corbec, in the Warhammer novel series Gaunt's Ghosts
- Colm Doherty, played by Brendan Gleeson, in the 2022 film The Banshees of Inisherin
- Lord Colm MacKenzie, a supporting character in the first and second seasons of Outlander, in which he is the elder maternal uncle of James "Jamie" MacKenzie-Fraser.
- Colm, also known as Punch Up, from the video game Dispatch developed by AdHoc Studio.

== Other uses ==
- × Colmanara, orchid genus abbreviated in trade journals as "Colm"
- COLM, Nasdaq code for Columbia Sportswear

== See also ==
- List of Irish-language given names
- Callum (disambiguation)
- Colom (disambiguation)
- Colum (disambiguation)
