= Calum =

Calum is a given name. It is a variation of the name Callum, which is a Scottish Gaelic name that commemorates the Latin name Columba, meaning "dove".

It may refer to:

- Calum Angus (born 1986), English footballer
- Calum Best (born 1981), British/American former fashion model turned celebrity
- Calum Bett (born 1981), Icelandic football player
- Calum Bowen (born 1991), known professionally as Bo En, British musician and video game producer
- Calum Butcher (born 1991), English footballer
- Calum Chace (born 1959), English writer and speaker
- Calum Chambers (born 1995), English footballer
- Calum Clark (born 1989), professional rugby union player
- Calum Elliot (born 1987), Scottish professional footballer
- Calum Ferguson (born 1995), Canadian soccer player
- Calum Forrester, professional Scottish rugby player
- Calum Giles (born 1972), former Great Britain Olympic field hockey player
- Calum Harper (born 2002), British model
- Calum Harvie, UK based music writer specialising in metal and extreme music
- Calum Hood (born 1996), bassist and member of Australian pop rock band 5 Seconds of Summer
- Calum Kennedy (1928–2006), Scottish singer
- Calum Lewis (born 1996), New Zealand former radio host at Fresh FM
- Calum Lill (born 1995 or 1996), British actor
- Calum MacDonald (musician) (born 1953), Scottish percussionist and lyricist of the band Runrig
- Calum MacDonald (politician) (born 1956), Scottish Labour Party Member of Parliament for the Western Isles from 1987 to 2005
- Calum Macdonald (footballer) (born 1997), footballer
- Calum MacKay (ice hockey) (1927–2001), former Canadian ice hockey player
- Calum Maclean (folklorist) (1915–1960), Scottish folklorist, collector, ethnographer and author
- Calum MacLeod (cricketer) (born 1988), Scottish professional cricketer
- Calum MacLeod (of Raasay), crofter who built Calum's Road on the Island of Raasay, Scotland
- Calum MacLeod (producer), the co-host, writer, creator and creative producer of the Canadian TV series Road Hockey Rumble
- Calum MacRae (born 1980), Scottish rugby union player
- Calum Malcolm, Scottish record producer, sound engineer and keyboardist
- Calum McFarlane (born 1985), English football manager
- Calum Murray (born 1967), Scottish football referee
- Calum O'Connell (born 1990), Australian footballer
- Calum Reidford (born 1987), Scottish professional football goalkeeper
- Calum Scott (born 1988), English singer and songwriter
- Calum Stewart (born 1982), Scottish player of the uilleann pipes and Irish flute
- Calum Willock (born 1981), English-born Saint Kittitian and Nevisian footballer
- Calum Woods (born 1987), English footballer
- Calum Worthy (born 1991), Canadian actor

== See also ==
- Callum, orthographic variant of the name
