= Henry Baskerville =

Henry Baskerville may refer to:

- Albert Henry Baskerville (1883–1908), New Zealand postal clerk, rugby union forward and author
- Sir Henry Baskerville, a fictional character in the Sherlock Holmes story The Hound of the Baskervilles.
