= Arthur Callum =

NZ international rugby league footballer

Arthur Callam
Personal information
- Full name: Arthur Richard Callam
- Born: 25 May 1877 Lower Hutt, Wellington, New Zealand
- Died: 19 December 1961 (aged 84) Concord, New South Wales, Australia

Playing information
- Height: 5 ft 9 in (1.75 m)
- Weight: 12 st 6 lb (79 kg)

Rugby union
- Position: Back row, Hooker
Club
| Years | Team | Pld | T | G | FG | P |
|---|---|---|---|---|---|---|
| 1899–03 | Melrose | 16 | 1 | 0 | 0 | 3 |
| 1904–06 | Poneke | 21 | 0 | 0 | 0 | 0 |
| 1907 | Wellington FC | 7 | 1 | 0 | 0 | 3 |
| | Total | 44 | 2 | 0 | 0 | 6 |
Representative
| Years | Team | Pld | T | G | FG | P |
| 1899 | Wellington Juniors | 1 | 0 | 0 | 0 | 0 |
| 1905 | Wellington B | 1 | 0 | 0 | 0 | 0 |
| 1906–07 | Wellington | 7 | 0 | 0 | 0 | 0 |

Rugby league
- Position: Loose forward
Representative
| Years | Team | Pld | T | G | FG | P |
|---|---|---|---|---|---|---|
| 1907–08 | New Zealand | 3 | 0 | 0 | 0 | 0 |
| 1908 | NZ A Team | 1 | 1 | 0 | 0 | 3 |

Arthur "Dick" Callum was a New Zealand rugby footballer who was part of the professional 1907-1908 New Zealand rugby tour of Great Britain.

== Early years ==
Callum was an insurance agent. It appears that his surname may have actually been spelled "Callam".

== Rugby Football ==
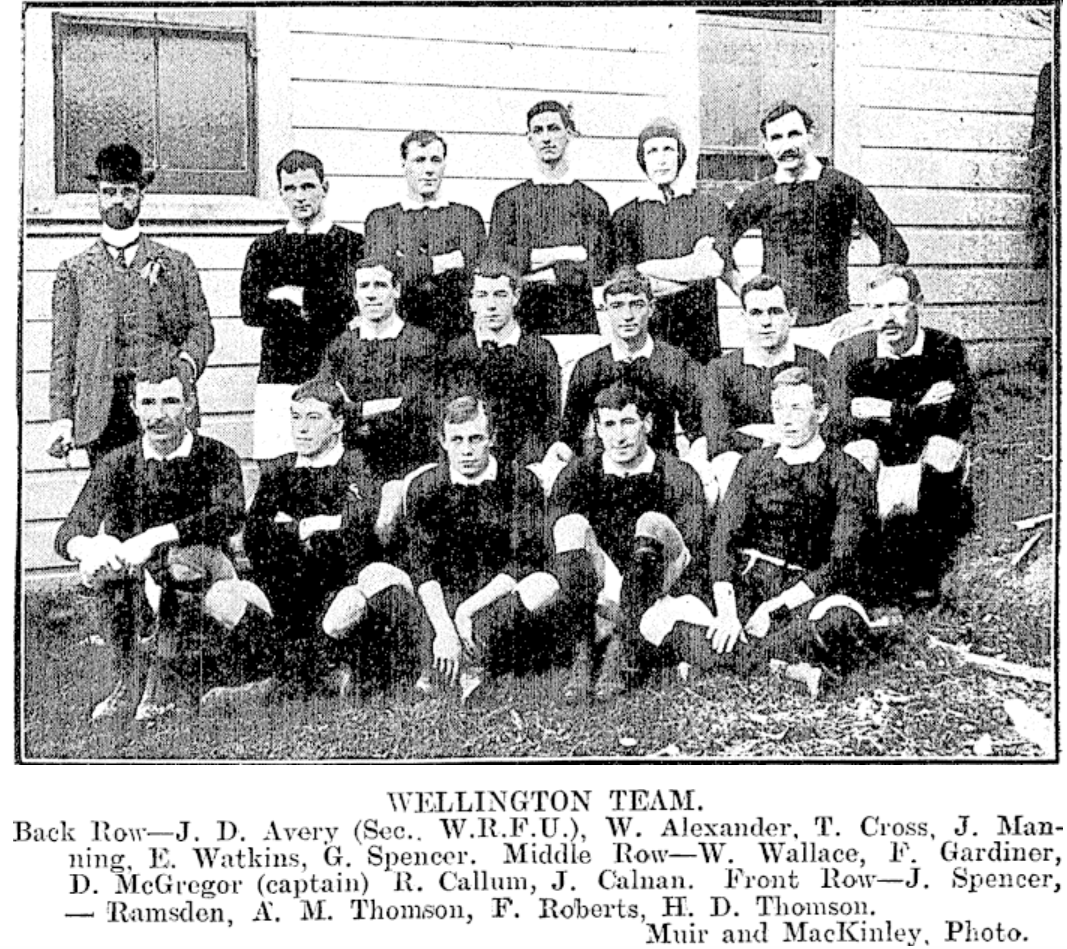
The Wellington team which defeated Wairarapa 62-9 on 4 June 1906.

Callum played rugby union for the Melrose Club. In 1901 he was suspended for failing to appear at a hearing where he was a witness. The entire Melrose club was then suspended following several disciplinary issues both on and off the field. In 1902 he left for the Boer War along with 4 other club mates. He became a more permanent member of the Melrose senior team after his return. In 1904 he transferred to the Poneke club and again to the Wellington Football Club in 1907. Callum represented Wellington in 1906 and 1907.

== Rugby League ==
Callum was selected for the professional All Blacks in their 1907–08 tour of Great Britain and Australia. Like all members of the tour, Gilchrist subsequently received a life ban from the New Zealand Rugby Union. Callum barely played on the tour and instead assisted Albert Baskerville in an administrative capacity. Despite this he played in two test matches near the end of the tour, when injuries had taken their toll. After he returned from the tour he played for an A Team against a B Team made up of the touring side in an exhibition match at Athletic Park before a crowd of 8,000. He scored a try in his sides 55-20 win. It was then reported in July that he was intending on moving to Australia to live.

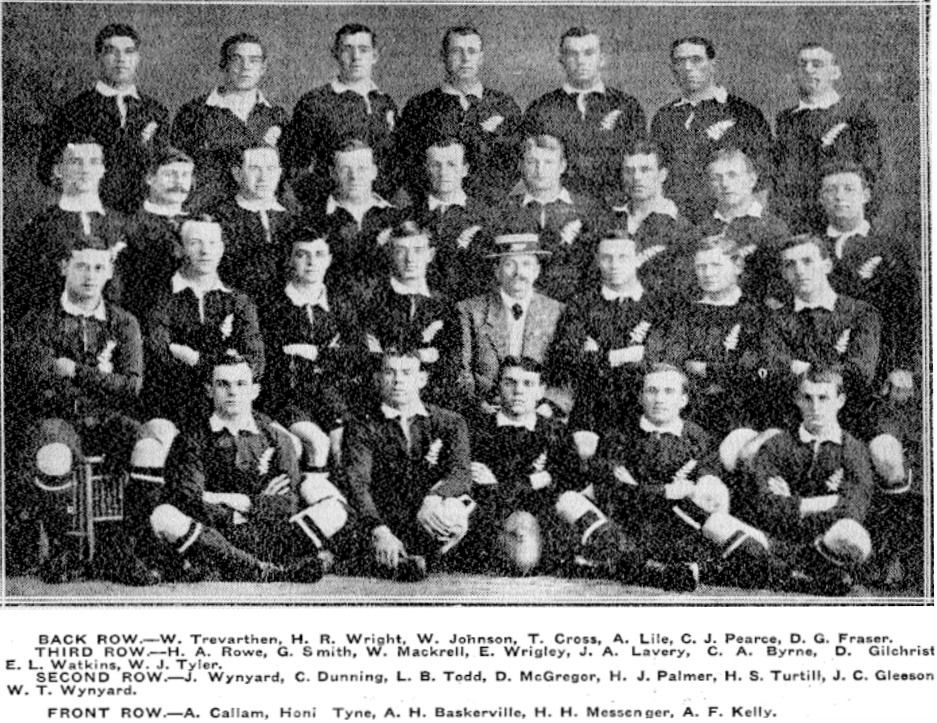
New Zealand Rugby League Team of 1907–08 to Tour England

== Personal life ==
In 1916 he married Ethel Marrion Quodling. Then in 1921 he remarried to Agnes Christina Tulloch. They had a daughter named Betty Campbell Callam on 10 December 1923. His sister, Mabel Annie Callam died on 21 February 1925. His mother (Eleanor Fairley Craig) died on 25 January 1955 in Wellington, while his brother Howard Reynolds Callam died on 21 August 1960 in Auckland. Arthur died on 19 December 1961 in Concord, New South Wales in Australia.
