= Courtney Goodwill Trophy =

Coordinates: 33.8892°S 151.2252°E

The Courtney Goodwill Trophy is a rugby league trophy that was awarded for competition among the national rugby league teams of Australia, France, Great Britain and New Zealand between 1936 and 1988. The trophy is displayed in the Heroes and Legends Museum at Rugby League Central in Moore Park, Sydney.

== History ==
The trophy was donated and designed by New Zealand businessman and rugby enthusiast Roy Courtney. The intention was that it would generate a feeling of goodwill between the then four test playing nations. The trophy was handed over to the Australian Rugby League Board of Control at the first test between Australia and Great Britain in Sydney on 29 June 1936.

With Great Britain winning the trophy in 1936 following victories over Australia and New Zealand, the trophy was held in Great Britain until 1951 although it was returned to Australia for safe storage during the Second World War. It was also considered for use as a substitute for the Ashes Cup when that trophy went missing in 1937. Until the 1950s the trophy was awarded ever time the holders played one of the other three teams but then the award was made every five years to the team with the highest winning percentage of test matches during that period. With the continued expansion of the Rugby League World Cup and difficulties in transporting the trophy the awarding of the trophy was withdrawn in 1988.

The trophy is now displayed in the Heroes and Legends Museum at Rugby League Central in Sydney.

=== Holders ===
- 1936: Great Britain
- 1950: Australia
- 1951: France
- 1965–1970: New Zealand (based on test performances between 1960 and 1964)
- 1970–1975: Australia
- 1975–1980: France
- 1980–1985: Australia
- 1985–1988: Australia

== Description ==
The trophy is on a square base that is 3 feet 6 inches (1.1 m) on each side, stands 4 feet (1.2 m) tall and weighs almost 110 pounds (50 kg).

The base is wooden and is in the form of a stepped pyramid inlaid with timbers from each of the four countries and carries an embossed silver globe mounted on four dolphins. Each dolphin has a scroll attached with an inscription from each country. These read Peace and Goodwill (England), Liberte, Fraternite (France), Unity and Equality (Australia), and Honour and Justice (New Zealand). Atop the globe is a figure representing Peace, holding a laurel wreath and a flaming torch.

On the steps of the base are symbolical figures in silver, again representing the four nations; Britannia and the lion (England), the crest of the Republic and a rooster (France), the kangaroo and aboriginal man (Australia), and the kiwi, silver fern and Maori (New Zealand).

On plates around the base are images of four pioneering rugby league players in action; James Lomas (England), Jean Galia (France), Dally Messenger (Australia), and Albert Henry Baskerville (New Zealand).

The trophy is completed with a domed shrine of remembrance bearing the inscription: "In commemoration of the supreme sacrifice and glorious deeds of sportsmen whose devotion to duty was in the cause of Peace and Goodwill."
