= Colombe =

Colombe may refer to:

== People ==
- Alain Colombe (born 1949), French slalom canoeist
- Anne Félicité Colombe (fl. 1793), French printer and political activist
- Colombe Pelletier (1923–2021), Canadian pianist, coach and accompanist
- Georges-Henri Colombe (born 1998), French rugby union player
- Jean Colombe (1430–1493), French painter and manuscript illuminator
- Lodovico delle Colombe (1565–1623), Italian Aristotelian scholar
- Michel Colombe (1430–1513), French sculptor
- Philippe Colombe (died 1722), Safavid artillery commander of French origin
- Colombe Jacobsen-Derstine (born 1977), American chef and actress
- Louis Saint Ange Morel, chevalier de la Colombe (1755–1825), French army officer

== Places ==
- Colombe, Isère, France, a commune
- La Colombe, Loir-et-Cher, France, a former commune
- La Colombe, Manche, France, a commune

== Arts and entertainment ==
- Colombe (play), a 1950 play by Jean Anouilh
- La colombe, an 1860 play by Charles Gounod
- "Une colombe", a 1984 Celine Dion song
- "La Colombe", a song by Jacques Brel
- Dove (Picasso) (French: La Colombe), a 1949 lithograph by Pablo Picasso

== Other uses ==
- French brig Colombe (1795)
- La Colombe Coffee Roasters, an American coffee roaster and retailer

== See also ==
- Colombe-lès-Vesoul, Haute-Saône, France
- Colombé-la-Fosse, Aube, France
- Colombé-le-Sec, Aube, France
- Garde-Colombe, Hautes-Alpes, France
- Colombes, Paris, France, a city
- Sainte-Colombe (disambiguation)
- Coulombe, a surname
- Colom (disambiguation)
