= Sainte-Colombe =

Sainte-Colombe may refer to the following places in France:

- Sainte-Colombe, Hautes-Alpes, in the Hautes-Alpes department
- Sainte-Colombe, Charente, in the Charente department
- Sainte-Colombe, Charente-Maritime, in the Charente-Maritime department
- Sainte-Colombe, Côte-d'Or, in the Côte-d'Or department
- Sainte-Colombe, Doubs, in the Doubs department
- Sainte-Colombe, Gironde, in the Gironde department
- Sainte-Colombe, Ille-et-Vilaine, in the Ille-et-Vilaine department
- Sainte-Colombe, Landes, in the Landes department
- Sainte-Colombe, Lot, in the Lot department
- Sainte-Colombe, Manche, in the Manche department
- Sainte-Colombe, Rhône, in the Rhône department
- Sainte-Colombe, Seine-Maritime, in the Seine-Maritime department
- Sainte-Colombe, Seine-et-Marne, in the Seine-et-Marne department
- Sainte-Colombe, Yonne, in the Yonne department
- Sainte-Colombe-de-Duras, in the Lot-et-Garonne department
- Sainte-Colombe-de-la-Commanderie, in the Pyrénées-Orientales department
- Sainte-Colombe-de-Peyre, in the Lozère department
- Sainte-Colombe-des-Bois, in the Nièvre department
- Sainte-Colombe-de-Villeneuve, in the Lot-et-Garonne department
- Sainte-Colombe-en-Bruilhois, in the Lot-et-Garonne department
- Sainte-Colombe-la-Commanderie, in the Eure department
- Sainte-Colombe-près-Vernon, in the Eure department
- Sainte-Colombe-sur-Gand, in the Loire department
- Sainte-Colombe-sur-Guette, in the Aude department
- Sainte-Colombe-sur-l'Hers, in the Aude department
- Sainte-Colombe-sur-Loing, in the Yonne department
- Sainte-Colombe-sur-Seine, in the Côte-d'Or department

Sainte Colombe may also refer to:

- Monsieur de Sainte Colombe, a French composer who added a low seventh string to the Viola da gamba. A portion of his life is the theme of the movie Tous les matins du monde, aka All the Mornings of the World

== See also ==
- Colombe (disambiguation)
