= Mark McGuckin =

- Born: Maple Ridge, British Columbia

Mark McGuckin is a Catholic priest, and the former co-host, writer, creator, and creative producer of the Canadian television series Road Hockey Rumble. Mark is an improvisational comic actor / filmmaker who majored in Film Production at the University of British Columbia. He wrote, directed, and starred in the short film Lyon King (2004) which screened at the Worldwide Short Film Festival in Toronto and is now being broadcast on CTV’s The Comedy Network. Mark's other credits include: principal actor in the short film Tomorrow Doesn’t Look Good Either (2004) which screened at the World Film Festival in Montreal and cinematographer on the Gemini Award winning CBC / Documentary Channel series College Days College Nights (2005) and the Life Network series Crash Test Mommy(2005).

After his ventures in television, a spiritual awakening in his late 20s led him back to the Catholic faith, and in 2016, he was ordained as a priest in the Archdiocese of Vancouver by Archbishop J. Michael Miller.
