= Colom (surname) =

Colom (Eastern Catalan: [kuˈlom]) is a Catalan surname meaning "dove". Notable people with the surname include:

- Álvaro Colom (1951–2023), Guatemalan politician
- Antoni Lluis Adrover Colom, known as Tuni (born 1982), Spanish professional footballer
- Antonio Colom (born 1978), Spanish cyclist
- Enrique Colom (born 1941), Spanish theologian
- Joan Colom (1921–2017), Catalan photographer
- Josep Colom (born 1947), Spanish pianist
- Josep Melcior Prat i Colom (1780–1855), Catalan nationalist politician and writer
- Manuel Colom Argueta (1932–1979), Guatemalan politician
- Quino Colom (born 1988), Andorran basketball player
- Scott Colom (born 1982), American attorney and politician
- Ulpiano Colóm, Mayor of Ponce, Puerto Rico, during part of 1898
