= New Zealand national rugby league team =

Sports team representing New Zealand

New Zealand

Team information
- Nickname: Kiwis (1926–present); Professional All Blacks (1909–1926); All Golds (1907–08; 2007) (Note: Before adopting the "Kiwis" nickname in 1926, the team was known as the "Professional All Backs" in reference to the union team or "All Golds" with "Gold" being a reference to them being paid. "All Golds" was the more popular term for their inaugural tour before "Professional All Blacks" became more prevalent. In 2007, the team temporarily rebranded as the "All Golds" to commemorate the centenary of their first tour.)
- Governing body: New Zealand Rugby League
- Region: Asia-Pacific
- Head coach: Stacey Jones
- Captain: James Fisher-Harris
- Most caps: Ruben Wiki (55)
- Top try-scorer: Manu Vatuvei (22)
- Top point-scorer: Jamayne Isaako (229)
- IRL ranking: 2nd

Uniforms
First colours	Second colours

Team results
- First international
- Wales 9–8 New Zealand (Aberdare, Wales; 1 January 1908)
- Biggest win
- New Zealand 78–0 Fiji (Queensland, Australia; 31 October 2026)
- Biggest defeat
- New Zealand 0–58 Australia (Wellington, New Zealand; 14 October 2007)
- World Cup
- Appearances: 16 (first time in 1954)
- Best result: (gold) Champions (2008)

The New Zealand national rugby league team (Māori: tīma rīki motu Aotearoa) has represented New Zealand in rugby league since 1907. Administered by the New Zealand Rugby League, they are commonly known as the Kiwis, after the native bird of that name. The team's colours are black and white, with the dominant colour being black, and the players perform a haka before every match they play as a challenge to their opponents. The New Zealand Kiwis are currently second in the IRL World Rankings. Since the 1980s, most New Zealand representatives have been based overseas, in the professional National Rugby League and Super League competitions. Before that, players were selected entirely from clubs in domestic New Zealand leagues.

A New Zealand side first played in a 1907 professional rugby tour which pre-dated the birth of rugby league football in the Southern Hemisphere, making it the second oldest national side after England. Since then the Kiwis have regularly competed in international competition, touring Europe and Australia throughout the 20th century. New Zealand have competed in every Rugby League World Cup since the first in 1954, reaching three consecutive tournament finals between 2000 and 2013. In 2008, New Zealand won the World Cup for the first time. They also contest the Baskerville Shield against England.

== History ==
Rugby football was introduced into New Zealand by Charles John Monro, son of the then speaker of the New Zealand House of Representatives, Sir David Monro. He had been sent to Christ's College, East Finchley in north London, where he became an enthusiastic convert to the new code. He brought the game back to his native Nelson, and arranged the first rugby match between Nelson College and Nelson Football Club, played on 14 May 1870.

When New Zealand's national rugby team (the All Blacks) toured Britain in 1905 they witnessed the growing popularity of the breakaway non-amateur Northern Union's games. On his return in 1906, All Black George William Smith met the Australian entrepreneur J J Giltinan to discuss the potential of professional rugby in Australasia. The first New Zealand team to play professional rugby was known as the All Blacks. To avoid confusion, the terms professional All Blacks or All Golds are used.

=== The professional All Blacks ===
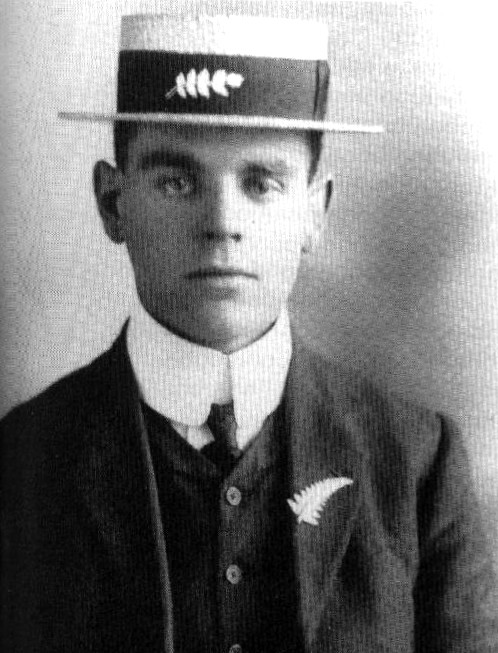
Albert Henry Baskerville.

In the meantime, a lesser known New Zealand rugby player, Albert Henry Baskerville (or Baskiville) was ready to recruit a group of players for a Great Britain pro tour. It is believed that Baskerville became aware of the profits to be made from such a venture while he was working at the Wellington Post Office in 1906. A colleague had a coughing fit and dropped a British newspaper. Baskerville picked it up and noticed a report about a Northern Union (NU) match that over 40,000 people had attended.

Baskerville wrote to the NRFU asking if they would host a New Zealand touring party. The 1905 All Blacks tour was still fresh in English minds, thus the NU saw the upcoming competitive New Zealand tour as exceptional opportunity to raise the profile and finances of the NU game. The NU agreed to the tour provided that some of those original All Blacks were included in the New Zealand team. George Smith arrived back in New Zealand and after learning of Baskerville's plans, the two teamed up and began signing players.

The New Zealand Rugby Union became aware of the tour and promptly applied pressure to any All Black or New Zealand representative player it suspected of involvement. They had the New Zealand Government's Agent General in London deliver a statement to the British press in an effort to undermine the tour's credibility. This had little effect and by that time the professional All Blacks were already sailing across the Tasman to give Australia its first taste of professional rugby.

=== The All Golds ===
It was during this time that references to the professional All Blacks as the All Golds first appeared.

Clearly, "All Golds" was a play on the amateur "All Blacks" name but it was also an insult to the players, criticising the arrangement where they would each share in the wealth of the tour. The name "All Golds" is now thought to have originated in a New Zealand newspaper in May/June 1907 (see panel below), amidst editorial arguments over whether it was honourable for the proposed "professional All Blacks" team to be paid.

The first documented use in Australia was in a headline in the Sydney Morning Herald (7 August), just before Baskerville's team arrived. Those same Herald articles also had a tag for those who supported the amateur rugby union calling them the "Lily Whites" (who were clean, pure, and repelled the evils of professionalism).

=== The first tour ===
Professional rugby in the southern hemisphere kicked off with the professional All Blacks playing a professional rebel New South Wales team organised by Smith's contact, James Giltinan. The games drew little interest to start with, but were a major success for the rugby rebels of Australia, as they finally had the money to start the first professional Rugby Football League and hence change the face of rugby in Australia.

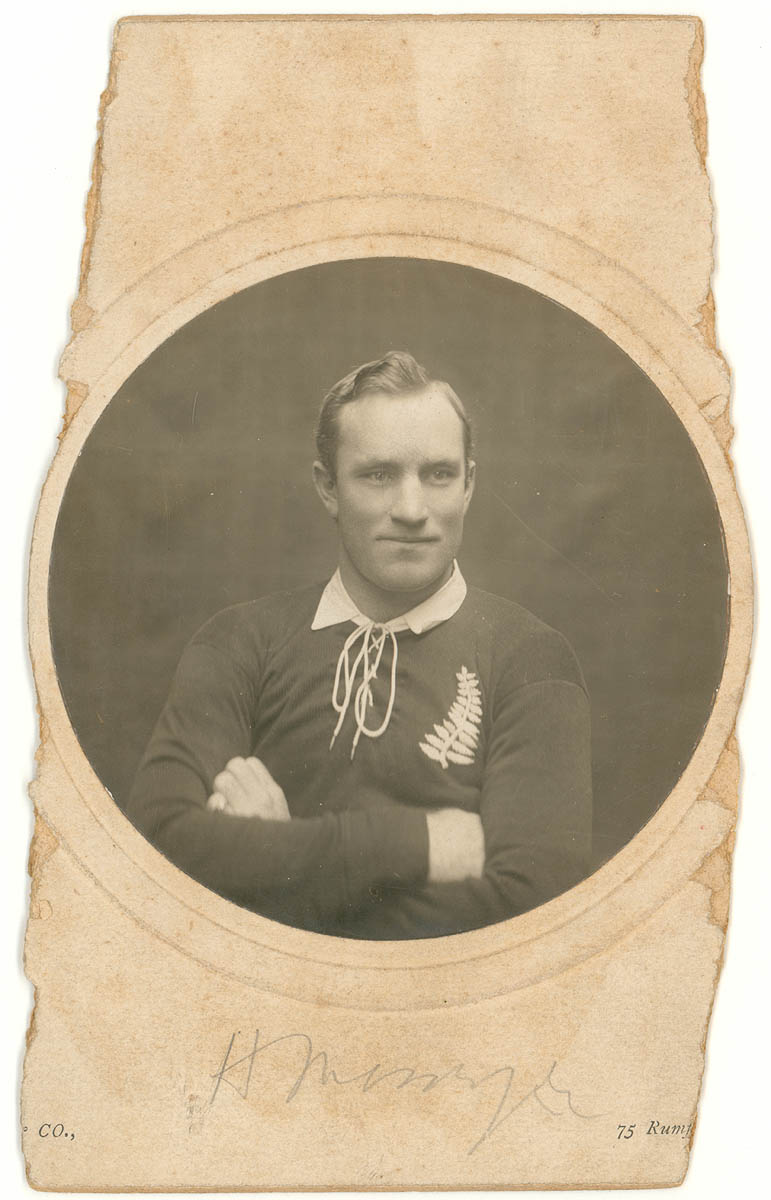
Dally Messenger, 1907 The one Australian All Black

New Zealand made it to Great Britain in 1907. They included Australian Dally Messenger in their party. He missed the first Test defeat, but played in the two Tests which the All Golds won. At this time professional rugby, under the banner of the Northern Union, was not played by the RFU rules which was all the All Golds knew. The All Golds took on a week of intensive training after which they started the tour. From a New Zealander's point of view, the tour may not have been successful, but to the All Gold's credit they performed well considering they only had a week to learn the rules. However, from the NU's point of view the tour would have been a godsend, because professional rugby was left in a better state than when they arrived. The tour's results were seen the following year when the NRFU clubs more than doubled their membership numbers. The tour had obviously excited the public, raised the profile of their game as well as the game's finances.

During their return voyage from England, the All Golds made a stop-over in Australia where they discovered that professional rugby was being played with Northern Union rules, under the banner of the New South Wales Rugby Football League (NSWRFL). The All Golds played another 10 games in Australia, boosting the finances of the fledgling NSWRFL premiership; making the All Golds tour one of the most significant contributions to the sport of rugby league in Australia.

The All Golds were Hercules Richard "Bumper" Wright (captain), George William Smith (vice-captain), Albert Baskirville (secretary), Herbert Turtill, Harold Rowe, Duncan McGregor, Dally Messenger, Edgar Wrigley, Joseph Lavery, Richard Wynyard, William Wynyard, Lance Todd, Edward Tyne, William Tyler, Arthur Kelly, Tom "Angry" Cross, William Massa Johnston, Eric Watkins, Conrad Byrne, Adam Lile, Daniel Gilchrist, Arthur Callam, Charles Pearce, William Trevarthen, Charles Dunning, William Mackrell, Daniel Fraser (assistant manager), Jim Gleeson (treasurer), and H.J. Palmer (financial manager).

=== The Kiwis ===
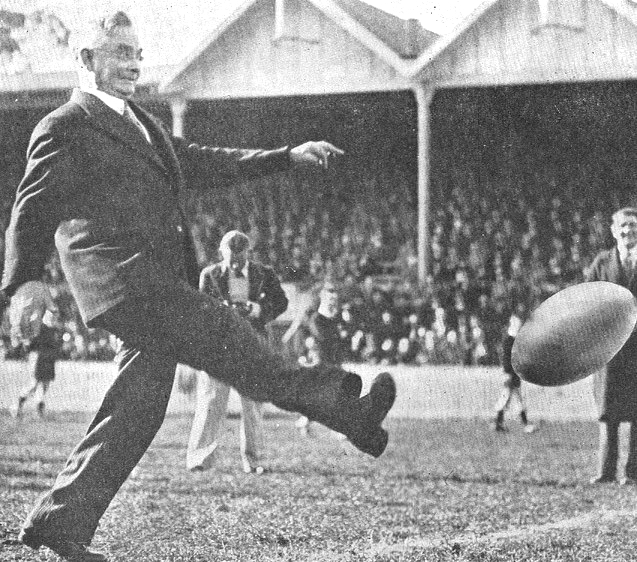
Michael Joseph Savage Prime Minister 1935–40 was the patron of NZ Rugby League.

The 1910 Great Britain Lions tour of Australia and New Zealand saw the Kiwis' first ever test on home soil, with the British side proving too strong. In 1911 the New Zealand national team toured Australia.

1920 represented a high point for New Zealand rugby league (and sport in that country) with two matches against the touring British Lions rugby league team drawing 40,000 fans each in Auckland's Domain.

The NZRU was able to control a lot of what the New Zealand Rugby League (NZRL) was able to get its hands on. In 1926, the Union took legal action, trying to stop the League from using the name, the "All Blacks" as their touring name. The NZRL felt that they had equal ownership to the name and were not ready to relinquish it. However, by this time the press had already nicknamed the team 'the Kiwis', because of the badge included on their jerseys. Despite the League trying to discourage its usage, the name has stuck ever since.

The 1926–27 New Zealand tour of Britain involved several skirmishes within the Kiwi party. Problems began on the boat journey over, with disputes developing about aspects of the trip and a rift developed between tour manager and coach, Mr Mair, an Australian and seven forwards. The disputes continued once the party arrived in Britain, with one of the rebels being involved in a street fight with another member of the tour party after the opening match. In mid-November, following further disturbances, which almost led to the tour party being evicted from their Harrogate hotel, it was decided that coach Mair would withdraw from team selection and match tactics for a period of four weeks. The tour, and the costly disputes, continued, with the rebels eventually setting sail for home a week earlier than their colleagues. Three months later all seven players were banned for life by the New Zealand authorities. New Zealand did not visit Europe again until 1939.

In 1938, for a tour of Australia, the New Zealand Rugby League officially adopted the name the "New Zealand Kiwis". This side was also the first to wear a white "V" on their jerseys.

=== Post-war ===
In 1947 at Odsal Stadium, Bradford in England, a crowd of 42,680 saw New Zealand play, setting a new record for the team on British soil.

The Kiwis were unbeaten in any test series from 1948 to 1951 and won six of their nine tests. They toured England and France in 1951–52. New Zealand were hosted by France for the first ever World Cup match in 1954's inaugural tournament. They lost that match as well as the remaining two to finish last. In the 1957 World Cup New Zealand got their first World Cup win, with victory against France in one of their three matches. The Kiwis got exactly the same result in the 1960 World Cup too.

During the 1961–63 era, New Zealand won seven out of ten test matches, including a 2–0 series win over Great Britain, then considered the top rugby league nation in the world. The most outstanding performance by the New Zealanders was their record-breaking 19–0 win over Britain in 1962. It was only the second time a British team had been held scoreless. New Zealand in the period 1960–65 won the Courtney Goodwill Trophy for most successful test-playing nation,

The Kiwis again got a sole win against France from their three matches of the 1970 World Cup.

In 1971, the Kiwis embarked on a 34 match tour of England and France. While they only won half of the matches they played against English club teams, they won the test series 2–1 (winning the first test 18–13, the second 17–14 but losing the third 3–12). They won the series against France 2–0 (winning the first test 27–11, the second 24–2 but drawing the third 3–3).

In the 1972 World Cup New Zealand failed to win a game. In the season-long 1975 World Series, New Zealand won 2 out of their 8 games, finishing second last. The 1977 World Cup brought the Kiwis the familiar result of a sole win against France. A World Cup rated Test took place on Sunday 7 July 1985 at Carlaw Park. Australia's 18–0 defeat was the first time they had failed to score in a Test against New Zealand.

On Tuesday 7 July 1987, New Zealand team warmed up for internationals against Papua New Guinea and Australia by taking on the Queensland state team at Lang Park, Brisbane. They then went on to record a 22–16 victory.

Australia crashed to a defeat on Tuesday 21 July 1987, when the Kangaroo dominance of the international game suffered a rare setback. New Zealand were their opponents in a match which had been arranged to fill the gap created by the non-appearance of France. New Zealand won the game 13–6. The next four internationals between Australia and New Zealand were all staged in New Zealand, and all were won by the Kangaroos. In the final Test match of the 1988 Great Britain Lions tour, New Zealand just pipped the British 12–10 in a freezing encounter in Christchurch for a place in the final against Australia. Played at Eden Park in Auckland, it was the most hyped game in the history of rugby league in New Zealand, and the crowd of 47,363 was the biggest ever for a game in Auckland. The final proved to be a huge anti-climax and they were outplayed by the Aussies.

On 20 June 1993 the first all-professional, and all-overseas based, Kiwis side took the field against Australia. New Zealand almost got their revenge on Australia in the 1995 World Cup semi-final when, with the scores level at 20–20, a last minute drop-goal attempt by skipper Matthew Ridge brushed the wrong side of the post, allowing the game to go into extra-time. From there, Australia went on to win. Due to the NZRL's alignment with Super League, a New Zealand team selected only from Australasian-based players competed in 1997's Super League Tri-series against Queensland and New South Wales.

In 1998 the Kiwis travelled to the UK for a three-test series against Great Britain, winning the first and second tests and drawing the third.

=== New Millennium ===
The Kiwis handed England their biggest ever loss to again make the final in the 2000 World Cup, but again went down to the Kangaroos 40–12. Gary Freeman coached New Zealand from 2001 to 2002. Beginning in 2002, a 'New Zealand A' team was selected from players in the domestic New Zealand competition. New Zealand A toured France and the United States in 2002, and the United Kingdom in 2003. In 2004 they hosted New South Wales Country.

In 2003 the Kiwis played their 100th international against Australia. Brian McClennan was appointed national coach of New Zealand in June 2005. His appointment was controversial, mainly because he had no professional coaching experience.

2005 would be considered one of the Kiwis greatest years, as they captured the 2005 Tri-Nations title, effectively becoming "de facto" World champions as the three best countries competed in that competition. In the course of winning the Tri-Nations the Kiwis defeated Australia in Sydney for the first time in half a century. In London, the Kiwis posted their highest score ever against Great Britain and, in winning the final, posted the first shut out of Australia in 20 years. The 24–0 result at Elland Road, Leeds equalled the Kiwis' biggest ever win against Australia – a 49–25 win in Brisbane almost 50 years previously. It was Australia's first defeat in a series or tournament since 1978. In New Zealand, Brian McClennan earned praise from the press and signed an extension to his coaching tenure with the Kiwis. In 2006 the Kiwis lost both mid-season tests to the Kangaroos and Lions. The 2006 Tri-nations brought controversy when New Zealand fielded an ineligible player, Nathan Fien, against Great Britain and were later stripped of the two points earned from their 18–14 win.

In July 2007, the Leeds Rhinos announced that Brian McClennan would be joining the club as Head Coach on a two-year contract from 1 December 2007. McClennan subsequently resigned as national coach and his position was taken up by Gary Kemble in August 2007.

=== All-Golds revival ===
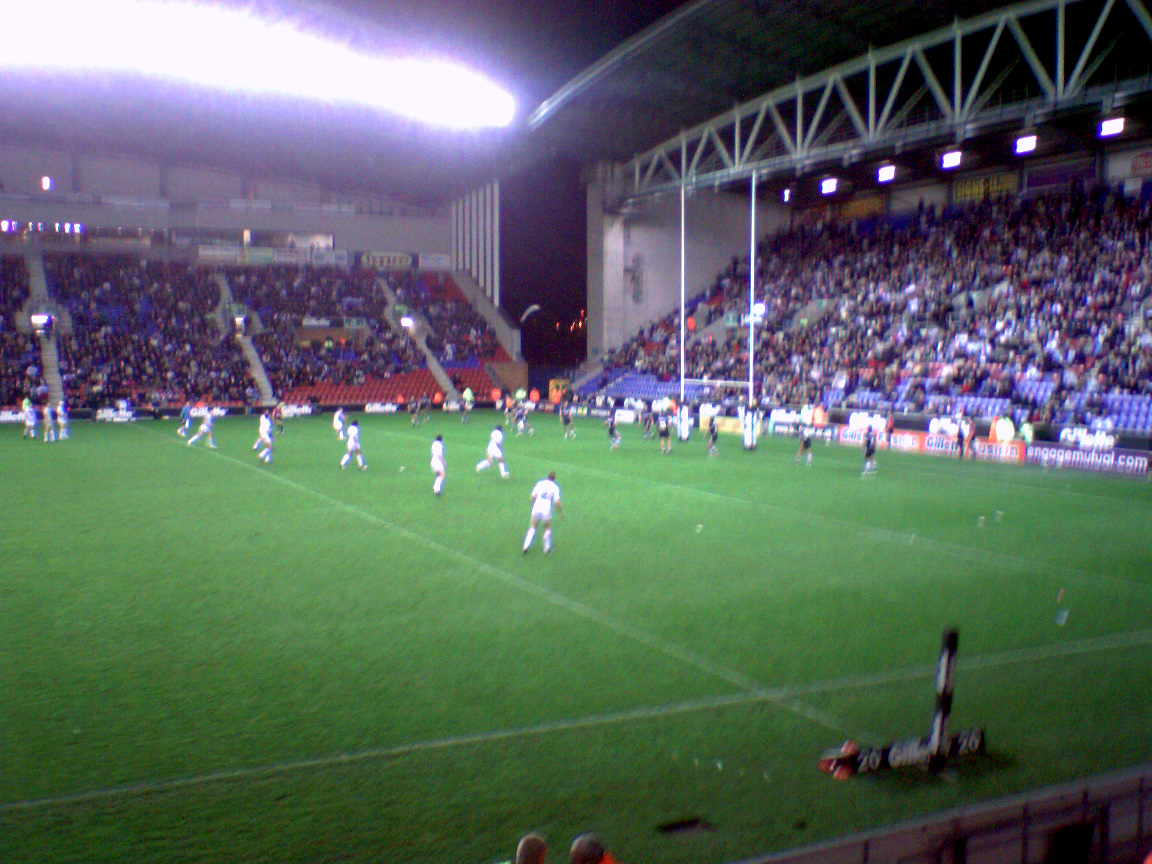
The final home Test for Great Britain against New Zealand, played at Wigan RLFC's DW stadium in 2007

Under Gary Kemble the Kiwis went on to lose the first of their three test series against Great Britain going down 14–20 against the Lions at Huddersfield on 27 October 2007. Following the loss an Australian newspaper reported that former Kiwi captain Hugh McGahan was concerned at Kemble's poor start and suggested that former Australian and current Brisbane Broncos coach Wayne Bennett should be pursued for the role. McGahan later claimed that his comments had been grossly misreported by the journalist.

In the second test of the series on 3 November 2007, Kemble returned to KC Stadium, the ground on which he had spent a large portion of his playing days with Hull F.C. It was to be a disastrous homecoming, however, as the Kiwis suffered their second humiliating defeat under Kemble when beaten 44–0 by an inspired Great Britain. The win gave Great Britain an unassailable series lead leaving the Kiwis with only pride to play for in the final test at JJB Stadium in Wigan.

Intense criticism followed the second test loss, some of it directed at the players, some of it toward the management of the NZRL. However, Kemble also copped severe criticism from some quarters with one commentator suggesting that Kemble "must be sacked at the series-end" and describing him as a "captain of calamity". Following the loss, Kiwi's captain Roy Asotasi hinted at the possibility of internal issues for the players in adjusting to Kemble's coaching style when he compared Kemble's approach with that of his predecessor McClennan describing them as "very different" and reporting that the group was "still trying to gel". Following the loss Kemble acknowledged that he was contemplating resigning from his post if the Kiwis were whitewashed 3–0 by Great Britain.

Despite a far more spirited performance in the third test the Kiwis were unable to prevent the whitewash losing 22–28 after leading 12–0 early in the match. Kemble was forthright in expressing his desire to remain Kiwi coach following the loss with the general feeling being that the loss was "close enough" for him to retain the position. Kemble was the subject of some ridicule for post-match comments which suggested that the Kiwis "almost won the test series" despite an aggregate score of 92–36 across the three tests.

In December 2007 the NZRL held its annual awards dinner. Being one hundred years since the inception of rugby league in New Zealand, a 13-man New Zealand team of the century was named on the evening, with Cliff Johnson named at captain. Mark Graham was named in the second-row and was also honoured as the greatest Kiwi player of the century.

Kemble resigned as head coach after captain Roy Asotasi and David Kidwell both publicly said that they had no confidence in his coaching abilities. Subsequently, former Kiwi, Stephen Kearney was appointed coach with Wayne Bennett given a role as an advisor.

The All Golds were revived again in 2008 as a testimonial match for Ruben Wiki, where they defeated the New Zealand Maori team 44–10 at Yarrow Stadium in New Plymouth.

=== Kearney's Kiwis ===
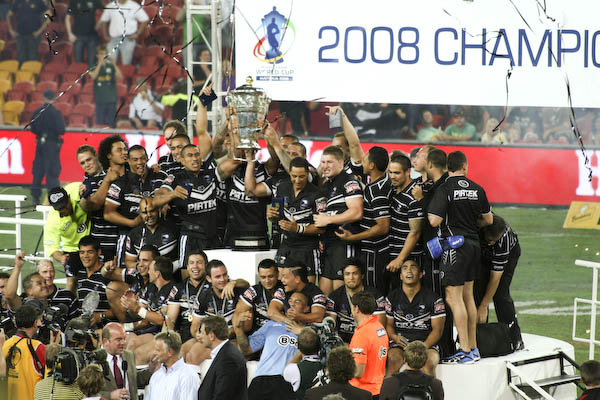
The Kiwis celebrating their World Cup final victory.

Stephen Kearney's first match as New Zealand coach was against Australia in the 2008 Centenary Test. The match celebrated 100 years since the first Trans-Tasman clash began. Later on in that year, the 2008 World Cup kicked off. Wayne Bennett assisted Kearney in the competition. Kearney's Kiwis advanced from the group stage in second position which saw them face England for a second time in the tournament, this time in the semi-final. In the group stage, the Kiwis were at one point trailing 24–8 before scoring 26 consecutive points and keep the Poms scoreless in the second half to go on to win 36–24. The Kiwis didn't have to recover a deficit in the semi-final as they went on to another World Cup final meeting with Australia. In a see-saw like battle, the Kiwis created history after full-time when they won the final 34–20. This was New Zealand's first ever World Cup title, as well as the Australian team's first loss since Great Britain defeated them in November 2006 and their first loss to New Zealand since November 2005. It was also their first loss in a World Cup match since 1995 and in a final since 1972.

At the end of the 2010 domestic season, New Zealand played in the 2010 Four Nations. During the Round-robin fixtures, New Zealand produced their biggest win on home soil with a 64-point win over Papua New Guinea. The Kiwis qualified for the final where they played Australia at the same venue as the 2008 World Cup final. The Kiwis won at Lang Park once again after a try in the final seconds of the game sealed the low scoring game, and 2010 Four Nations title, for the Kiwis, winning 16–12.

In 2013 New Zealand headed into the World Cup as defending champions for the first time. The Kiwis advanced out of their group with ease despite suffering a scare against Samoa in their opening game. Kearney's men then advanced to the semi-finals, courtesy of a win over Scotland, where they then met hosts England at Wembley. It was a see-saw affair which saw the Kiwis trailing 18–14 with one minute on the clock remaining until star play-maker Shaun Johnson produced a magical moment to level the scores and then convert his try after the siren to win the match and make the Kiwis advance to a third consecutive World Cup final. The win also made the Kiwis equal their best winning streak record of five games. In the final, watched by a record international attendance of 74,468, they were outclassed at 'The Theatre of Dreams' as Australia earned revenge for their 2008 final defeat. After the World Cup Kearney was put under pressure after it was found out players were mixing sleeping pills and energy drinks during the tournament which affected performances. He had to reapply for his job and was only given a two-year contract, unlike the usual one that would end after the next World Cup, which the NZRL said was because he needed to "re-establish the culture at the Kiwis which was damaged so badly at the World Cup". Kearney immediately took action, naming six debutantes for the first test-match of 2014.

At the end of the 2014 club season New Zealand played in the 2014 Four Nations. In the first game they continued their good record against Australia at the 'Cauldron' with another win setting the record at 3 wins in the past 4 meetings against the Kangaroos at the venue. In the second game the Kiwis faced another scare against Samoa when they were on the verge of a 12–10 defeat with just minutes remaining before Kearney's men scored near full-time to avoid the shock result. After defeating England in their final game they qualified for the final held in Wellington where they'd face Australia again. New Zealand won the match 22–18 and therefore the Four Nations, their second tournament title. This was their first win over Australia on home soil since 2003 where they beat the Aussies at North Harbour Stadium. In the final, winger Manu Vatuvei scored two tries to become New Zealand's top try-scorer after tallying his 20th try during the match to beat a record that's been held by Nigel Vagana since 2006. This was the first time New Zealand went through an entire tournament unbeaten.

In March 2015, Kearney's successful management saw the NZRL announce an extension to his contract until the end of the 2017 World Cup. The 2015 Anzac Test was held in Suncorp Stadium. The Kiwis continued their great record in Brisbane with a commanding 26–12 victory giving them their first Anzac test win since 1998. It was also the first time since 1953 that New Zealand beat Australia in three consecutive test matches. This win also meant New Zealand equaled their best winning streak record once again just like they did after the 2013 World Cup semi-final. On 15 May 2015, the new RLIF World Rankings were announced and it read that, for just the second time, New Zealand were officially the best team in the World. New Zealand were last ranked World number one back in 2008 after their World Cup success. At the end of the year New Zealand were unable to beat their winning record after losing the Baskerville Series to England. At the conclusion of that series, it was revealed that Kearney had the best record out of any New Zealand coach to date as he was involved in the most matches (41), won the most matches (23), and won the most matches against Australia (5). He also revealed that despite the defeat to England he wanted the Kiwis to 'dominate the next decade of international rugby league'.

Before the 2016 Anzac Test, controversy had occurred when regular New Zealand players Manu Vatuvei and Ben Matulino were caught partying and mixing energy drinks with prescription drugs. Kearney toughened his stance and announced he'd not be selecting them for the test-match in a decision which saw commends from fellow New Zealand internationals. These players were just two of ten regular name players missing from the New Zealand side for the fixture, with others missing through injury or private issues. New Zealand lost the match 16–0 and in the process ended their winning streak against Australia. This was also the first time New Zealand scored zero points in a test match since 2007.

In September 2016, Kearney left New Zealand after accepting an offer to coach New Zealand's only NRL team.

=== Kidwell's Kiwis ===
David Kidwell's first match as New Zealand coach was against Australia in Perth. This was the first time an international rugby league game was held in Western Australia. In the 2016 Four Nations, New Zealand beat England for the first time on English soil since the tournament was introduced in 2009. In New Zealand's last round-robin fixture, they drew with Scotland and, in the process, gave the 'fourth nation' their first ever point in the tournament's history. Despite the shock result, New Zealand still managed to qualify for a rematch with Trans-Tasman rivals, Australia, in the final. After losing by just 6 points in the round-robin stage meeting, the Kiwis were thrashed by the Kangaroos in the final 34–8.

After the final Anzac Test fixture was played, Kidwell spoke on behalf of the NZRL to announce that captain Jesse Bromwich, and Kevin Proctor were suspended from playing in the World Cup after they were caught buying cocaine from a stranger after the test-match.

Controversy occurred before the 2017 World Cup, after star forward, Jason Taumalolo, decided to switch allegiances after choosing to play for Tonga at the World Cup rather than his country of birth. David Fusitu'a, Sio Siua Taukeiaho and Manu Ma'u, who were all in contention for World Cup selection, also followed Taumololo's lead. Australian forward Andrew Fifita did likewise, after initially being selected in the Australian team, making Tonga one of the tournament favourites. It was at first believed, Taumalolo switched to play for Tonga in protest for the NZRL's decision to suspend Bromwich and Proctor from playing in the World Cup. However, it was later confirmed he just wanted to play for his family, and grow the game in the Pacific Island nation. Former New Zealand coach, Graham Lowe, and former New Zealand captain, Benji Marshall, hit out at Taumalolo for his decision. New Zealand began the World Cup with convincing victories over both Samoa, and Scotland. In their final pool match, they took on the 'most-talked about team of the tournament', Tonga. After leading 16–2 at halftime, New Zealand created unwanted history, becoming the first tier-1 nation to lose to a tier-2 nation in a World Cup match. New Zealand then took on Fiji in the quarter-final. Kidwell's side went on to create back-to-back defeats to tier-2 nations and therefore be eliminated in the quarterfinals. This was the lowest ever finish the Kiwis created in a World Cup tournament. After the match, critics and media were hitting out at Kidwell and his players with the way they handled the defeat. After the Kiwis' most embarrassing World Cup performance in history, pressure was put on Kidwell to leave.

== Team image ==
=== Kit uniform ===
Since the late 1880s, the New Zealand Kiwis have worn black shirt, shorts and socks which became their representative colours. Black has identified New Zealand athletic teams since that times, starting with the establishment of the "NZ Amateur Athletic Association" (the main body that regulated sports in the country) in 1887. When the association hosted national athletic events across the country, black was the colour worn by the athletes on those competitions.

Nevertheless, the first rugby national team had toured on New South Wales in 1884 wearing a blue shirt with a gold fern on the chest, although it changed to black shirt with a silver fern four years later, according to the Auckland Star newspaper of July 6.

=== Kit suppliers and sponsors ===
Period	Kit provider	Sponsor on front of shirt	Sponsor on top of back of shirt	Sponsor on sleeves
1975–1991	(Germany) Adidas	Autex (1980–1985)	None	Autex (1980–1985)
1992–1994	Canterbury of New Zealand	None	None	Lion Red
1995–1997	(Australia) SportM	Lion Red	None	Lion Red
1997 (SL)	(United States) Nike	None	None	None
1998–2001	(Germany) Puma	Vodafone	Vodafone	Zena Jewellers
2002–2003	(Germany) Puma	Konami	Konami	Bartercard
2004–2006	(New Zealand) SAS Sports	Chrisco (2005–2007)	Chrisco	Lion Red
2007–2008	(Australia) ISC	Pirtek	Pirtek	Sunday News
2009–2011	(United Kingdom) KooGa	Pirtek	Malaysia Airlines	
2012–2016	(Australia) BLK	Pirtek	Malaysia Airlines	Flight Centre
2014 Anzac Test	(Australia) BLK	Pirtek	None	
2014 Rugby League Four Nations	(Australia) BLK	Pirtek	[[Stuff (website)|#goodstuff]]	
2015 Anzac test	(Australia) BLK	Pirtek	Skycity	
2015 Baskerville Shield	(Australia) BLK	Pirtek	Sky	
2016 Anzac test – 2016 Rugby League Four Nations	(Australia) BLK	Pirtek	G.J. Gardner. Homes	
2017 Anzac test – 2017 Rugby League World Cup	(Italy) Macron	Pirtek	G.J. Gardner. Homes	Mainstream Freight Group
2018 Baskerville Shield −10\9	(Australia) ISC	Pirtek		Mainstream Freight Group
2019–2024	(Australia) BLK	Pirtek		Mainstream Freight Group
2024–present	(New Zealand) Dynasty Sport	Pirtek	Sky	Mainstream Freight Group

On the back of the shorts, Revera is on the bottom left and the bottom right.

=== Haka ===
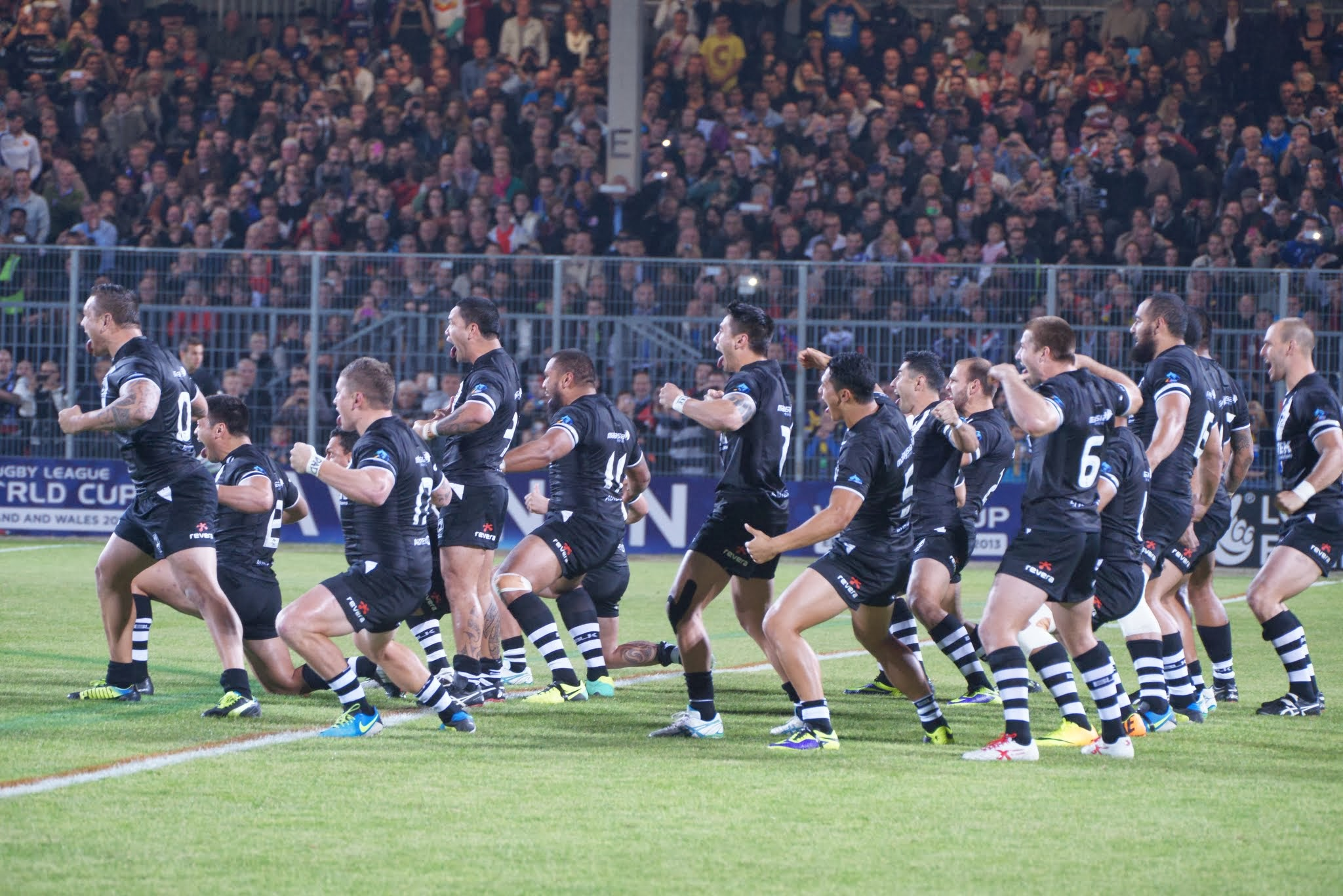
New Zealand performing their new 'Te Iwi Kiwi' Haka at the 2013 World Cup

The haka is a very respected tradition to the Kiwis, which is why they turn down offers to do it for sponsorship/promotional purposes. The initiation haka is used as a form of team-bonding for the Kiwis, although this haka has a unique twist. All new players and staff are required to perform an initiation haka, even journalists have been forced into it. This usually happens during an open training session. Staff and players gather into a circle, with new players and staff standing inside the circle. They then strip down to their underwear and start performing a haka. As the haka starts, the team members forming the circle start to lower themselves, revealing the performance to media and fans who have shown up.

Before the matches, the Kiwis traditionally performed the Ka Mate haka, but, since the 2013 Rugby League World Cup, they instead perform the Te Iwi Kiwi haka. The words of the latter are translated as follows: Its pèrformance is preceded by the team forming a huddle with the leader at the centre while the karakia "Tūturu whakamaua kia tīnā! Tīnā! Haumi e, hui e! tāiki e!" is chanted.

"Te Iwi Kiwi"
Leader:	Tukua te kawau mārō	Battle formation
	Ngā Kiwi o te ao	A call to all Kiwis of the world
Leader:	Tēnā huakina	Unleash the spirit within
Leader:	Tēnā poua!	Prepare the post for our house!
Leader!:	Pou tūturu	The Māori pou (pillar), the indigenous people
Team:	Rūrū ana!	Let the earth shake and ground rumble
Leader:	Pou tūhono	The pou that links all cultures
Team:	Tūmatauenga	The God of War
Leader:	Te ope taua?	Who is this war party?
Team:	Ko te kapa Kiwi e!	It is the Kiwi war party!
Leader:	Tau mai taku mana	I draw my power
Team:	Nō tua whakarere	From the beginning of time
Leader:	Tau mai ko te ihi	I draw my strength
Team:	Nō ōku tupuna	From my ancestors
	Hī nei taku whare	Here stands my House
	Kia tūpato	Be careful,
	Kei mate!	For I will defend it!
	Hī, hā!	The breath of Life

== Coaches ==
The current coach of New Zealand is Stacey Jones.

== Players ==
=== Current roster ===
The New Zealand national team squad selected for the 2026 Rugby League World Cup. James Fisher-Harris was appointed captain and Joseph Tapine was appointed vice-captain.

Jersey numbers in the table reflect team selection for the Final against Australia.

Statistics in this table are compiled from the website, Rugby League Project. Tallies include the match versus Australia on 15 November 2026.

J#	Player	Age	Position(s)	Kiwis						Club	NRL Matches	Other Reps
J#	Player	Age	Position(s)	Dbt	M	T	G	F	P	Club	NRL Matches	Other Reps
1	Kalyn Ponga	28	Fullback	2026	3	2	0	0	8	Newcastle Knights	164	1 13 3
2	Jamayne Isaako	30	Wing, Fullback	2018	19	12	90	1	229	Dolphins (NRL)	185	1
3	Dane Gagai	35	Centre	2026	4	2	0	0	8	Newcastle Knights	339	7 23 3 3 2
4	Casey McLean	20	Centre, Wing	2024	9	17	0	0	68	Penrith Panthers	49	1 1
5	Ronaldo Mulitalo	27	Wing	2022	14	12	0	0	48	Cronulla-Sutherland Sharks	153
6	Kodi Nikorima	32	Five-eighth, Halfback	2015	24	4	0	0	16	Dolphins (NRL)	243	4
7	Jahrome Hughes	32	Halfback	2019	16	9	0	0	36	Melbourne Storm	188	3
8	James Fisher-Harris	30	Prop	2016	26	3	0	0	12	New Zealand Warriors	245	6
9	Jeremy Marshall-King	30	Hooker	2022	9	3	0	0	12	Dolphins (NRL)	168	2
10	Moses Leota	31	Prop	2022	13	0	0	0	0	Penrith Panthers	226
11	Isaiah Papali'i	28	Second-row	2018	20	6	1	0	26	Penrith Panthers	202	1
12	Briton Nikora	28	Second-row	2019	21	7	0	0	28	Cronulla-Sutherland Sharks	180	3 6
13	Joseph Tapine	32	Lock, Prop	2016	31	3	0	0	12	Canberra Raiders	260	5
14	Te Maire Martin	31	Hooker, Five-eighth	2016	8	4	0	0	16	New Zealand Warriors	123	2
15	Naufahu Whyte	24	Lock, Prop	2024	10	2	0	0	8	Sydney Roosters	82
16	Erin Clark	29	Hooker	2024	9	2	0	0	8	New Zealand Warriors	146	2 1
17	Xavier Willison	24	Prop, Second-row	2026	6	2	0	0	8	Brisbane Broncos	75	1 2
18	Keano Kini	22	Fullback	2024	8	5	0	0	20	Gold Coast Titans	52	2
19	Phoenix Crossland	26	Hooker, Halfback	2024	10	3	0	0	12	Newcastle Knights	131
20	Charnze Nicoll-Klokstad	31	Centre, Fullback	2019	19	9	0	0	36	New Zealand Warriors	152	3
21	Scott Sorensen	33	Second-row	2022	5	1	0	0	4	Penrith Panthers	163
22	Leo Thompson	26	Prop	2023	6	1	0	0	4	Canterbury-Bankstown Bulldogs	99	3
–	Tanner Stowers-Smith	22	Prop	2026	1	2	0	0	8	New Zealand Warriors	34
IJ	Jacob Laban	22	Second-row	2026	1	0	0	0	0	New Zealand Warriors	44	2

Notes

- A bold number in the NRL Matches column indicates that the player has played all their NRL appearances at their current club.
- Six members of the squad had previously played for other nations:
  - Samoa (5): Clark, Isaako, Leota, Mulitalo and Papali'i.
  - Cook Islands (1): Nicoll-Klokstad.
  - Australia (1): Dane Gagai
- Sixteen squad members have played in All Stars matches.
  - Māori All Stars (16).
- Casey McLean played for New South Wales Under 19s in June 2024.

=== Captains ===
Category:New Zealand national rugby league team captains

=== Team of the Century (1907–2006) ===
1. Des White 2. Tom Hadfield 3. Tommy Baxter 4. Roger Bailey 5. Phillip Orchard 6. George Menzies 7. Stacey Jones
8. Cliff Johnson (c) 9. Jock Butterfield 10. Ruben Wiki 11. Mark Graham 12. Ron Ackland 13. Mel Cooke

== Records ==
- **Bold**- denotes that the player is still active.

=== Team ===
- Highest score: 82-16 vs Cook Islands in Christchurch 2026
- Greatest winning margin: 78–0 vs Fiji in Gold Coast 2026
- Greatest defeat: 0–58 vs Australia in Wellington 2007
- Most consecutive wins: 6 (2019 Lions tour and 2021 World Cup)
- Most consecutive losses: 11 (15 November 1965 – 1 June 1969)
- Highest attended match: 74,468 at the 2013 Rugby League World Cup final in Manchester

=== Individual ===
**Most Test appearances**

- 55 – Ruben Wiki 1994–2008
- 51 – Adam Blair 2006, 2008–2012, 2014–2019
- 48 – Stacey Jones 1995–2006
- 46 – Gary Freeman 1986–1995
- 45 – Stephen Kearney 1993–2004
- 45 – Simon Mannering 2006–2017
- 42 – Issac Luke 2008–2017
- 40 – Thomas Leuluai 2003–2011, 2013–2017
- 39 – Nathan Cayless 1998–2008
- 38 – Nigel Vagana 1998–2006

**Most Test Tries (15+)**

- 22 – Manu Vatuvei 2005–2010, 2012–2015
- 19 – Nigel Vagana 1998–2006
- 19 – Jason Nightingale 2008–2017
- 17 – Sean Hoppe 1992–2002
- 17 — **Casey McLean** 2024–
- 16 – Hugh McGahan 1982–1990
- 16 – Kevin Iro 1987–1998
- 16 – Stacey Jones 1995–2006
- 15 – Ruben Wiki 1994–2006
- 15 – James Blackmore 1991–2000
- 15 – Bernard Hadfield 1956–1961
- 15 – Phillip Orchard 1969–1975

**Most Test Goals**

- 90 - **Jamayne Isaako** 2018–2026
- 84 – Shaun Johnson 2012–2019, 2024
- 71 – Matthew Ridge 1990–1998
- 63 – Des White 1950–1956
- 60 – Daryl Halligan 1992–1998
- 52 – Henry Paul 1993–2001
- 47 – Stacey Jones 1995–2006
- 47 – Jack Fagan 1961–1965
- 44 – Olsen Filipaina 1977–1986
- 42 – Benji Marshall 2005–2012, 2019

**Most games as Captain**

- 22 – Benji Marshall (2008–2012, 2019)
- 19 – Gary Freeman (1990–1993, 1995)
- 18 – Ruben Wiki (2003–2006)
- 18 – Mark Graham (1980–1983, 1985–1986)
- 15 – Roy Christian (1970–1972)
- 14 – Ken Stirling (1974–1975, 1978)
- 14 – Cliff Johnson (1957–1960)

**Most points in a match**

- 38 (3 tries, 13 goals) - **Jamayne Isaako** (2026) v Cook Islands, 25 October 2026
- 26 (1 try, 11 goals) – Henry Paul (1999) v Tonga, 22 October 1999
- 26 (13 goals) – **Jamayne Isaako** (2026) v Fiji, 31 October 2026
- 24 (2 tries, 8 goals) – Shaun Johnson (2013) v France, 1 November 2013
- 24 (12 goals) – Tasesa Lavea (2000) v Cook Islands, 2 November 2000
- 24 (6 tries) – Hugh McGahan (1983) v Papua New Guinea, 2 October 1983
- 22 (1 try, 9 goals) – Bryson Goodwin v (2009) v France, 31 October 2009
- 22 (1 try, 9 goals) – Shaun Johnson (2017) v Scotland, 4 November 2017

**Most Test Points (100+)**

- 229 – **Jamayne Isaako** (12 tries, 90 goals, 1 field goal) 2018–2026
- 225 – Shaun Johnson (14 tries, 84 goals, 1 field goal) 2012–2019, 2024
- 168 – Matthew Ridge (6 tries, 71 goals, 2 field goals) 1990–1998
- 160 – Stacey Jones (16 tries, 47 goals, 2 field goals) 1995–2006
- 137 – Daryl Halligan (4 tries, 60 goals, 1 field goal) 1992–1998
- 132 – Des White (2 tries, 63 goals) 1950–1956
- 121 – Henry Paul (4 tries, 52 goals, 1 field goal) 1993–2001
- 116 – Benji Marshall (8 tries, 42 goals) 2005–2012, 2019
- 108 – Olsen Filipaina (6 tries, 44 goals) 1977–1986

**Most points (all matches)**

- 467 – Des White (7 tries and 233 goals) 1950–1956

**Most tries in a match**

- 6 – Hugh McGahan (1983) v Papua New Guinea, 2 October 1983
- 4 – Brian Jellick (1999) v Tonga, 22 October 1999
- 4 – Manu Vatuvei (2008) v England, 8 November 2008
- 4 – **Dallin Watene-Zelezniak** (2022) v Jamaica, 23 October 2022
- 4 - **Casey McLean** (2024) v Papua New Guinea, 10 November 2024
- 4 — **Casey McLean** (2026 Rugby League World Cup) v Fiji, 31 October 2026
- 3 - Clinton Toopi (2003 Centenary Test) v Australia, 18 October 2003
- 3 - Clinton Toopi (2005 Tri-Nations) v Australia, 15 October 2005
- 3 – Jerome Ropati (2008) v Tonga, 18 October 2008
- 3 – Sam Perrett (2009) v France, 31 October 2009
- 3 – Sam Perrett (2010) v Papua New Guinea, 30 October 2010
- 3 – Junior Sau (2010) v Papua New Guinea, 30 October 2010
- 3 – Manu Vatuvei (2013) v Samoa, 27 October 2013
- 3 – Sonny Bill Williams (2013) v Papua New Guinea, 8 November 2013
- 3 – Peta Hiku (2017) v Scotland, 4 November 2017
- 3 – Te Maire Martin (2017) v Scotland, 4 November 2017
- 3 - **Jamayne Isaako** (2026) v Cook Islands, 25 October 2026

== Competitive record ==
New Zealand have been playing international matches since 1907. Below is a list of test matches played by the New Zealand national rugby league team up until 20 October 2025.

Country	Matches	Won	Drawn	Lost	Win%	For	Aga	Diff
Australia	146	35	3	108	23.97%	1,944	3,321	–1,377
(United Kingdom) (Australia) British Empire XIII	1	0	0	1	0%	2	26	–24
Cook Islands	2	2	0	0	100%	134	10	+124
England	19	9	1	9	47.37%	374	342	+32
France	56	35	5	16	62.5%	1,067	592	+475
Fiji	1	1	0	1	50%	26	22	+4
Great Britain	111	41	5	65	36.94%	1,622	2,047	–425
Great Britain/France	1	0	0	1	0%	31	37	–6
Ireland	1	1	0	0	100%	48	10	+38
Jamaica	1	1	0	0	100%	68	6	+62
Lebanon	2	2	0	0	100%	98	12	+86
Papua New Guinea	19	18	0	1	94.74%	866	238	+628
Rest of the World	1	1	0	0	100%	22	10	+12
Samoa	6	6	0	0	100%	218	68	+150
Scotland	3	2	1	0	66.67%	132	28	+104
South Africa	1	0	0	1	0%	3	4	–1
Tonga	8	6	0	2	75%	303	129	+174
Wales	10	7	0	3	70%	264	158	+106
Total	389	167	15	208	42.93%	7,222	7,060	+162

=== Tournament history ===
A red box around the year indicates tournaments played within New Zealand

==== World Cup ====
World Cup record
Year	Round	Position	GP	W	L	D
(France) 1954	Fourth place	4/4	3	0	3	0
(Australia) 1957	Third place	3/4	3	1	2	0
(United Kingdom) 1960	Third place	3/4	3	1	2	0
(Australia) (New Zealand) 1968	Fourth place	4/4	3	0	3	0
(United Kingdom) 1970	Fourth place	4/4	3	1	2	0
(France) 1972	Fourth place	4/4	3	0	3	0
(Australia) (France) (New Zealand) (United Kingdom) 1975	Fourth place	4/5	8	2	4	2
(Australia) (New Zealand) 1977	Third place	3/4	3	1	2	0
1985–88	Second place	2/5	7	4	2	1
1989–92	Third place	3/5	8	5	3	0
(England) (Wales) 1995	Third place	3/10	3	2	1	0
(England) (France) (Ireland) (Scotland) (Wales) 2000	Second place	2/16	6	5	1	0
(Australia) 2008	Champions	1/10	5	4	1	0
(England) (Wales) 2013	Second place	2/14	6	5	1	0
(Australia) (New Zealand) (Papua New Guinea) 2017	Quarter Finals	6/14	4	2	2	0
(England) 2021	Fourth place	4/16	5	4	1	0
(Australia) (Papua New Guinea) (New Zealand) 2026	In progress		3	2	1	0
Total	1 Title	16/16	74	37	34	3

==== Tri-Nations/Four Nations ====
Tri-Nations/Four Nations record
Year	Round	Position	GP	W	L	D
(Australia) (New Zealand) 1999	Second place	2/3	3	2	1	0
(United Kingdom) 2004	Third place	3/3	4	0	3	1
(United Kingdom) 2005	Champions	1/3	5	3	2	0
(Australia) (New Zealand) 2006	Second place	2/3	5	2	3	0
Tournament Changed to Four Nations
(England) (France) 2009	Third place	3/4	3	1	1	1
(Australia) (New Zealand) 2010	Champions	1/4	4	3	1	0
(England) (Wales) 2011	Third place	3/4	3	1	2	0
(Australia) (New Zealand) 2014	Champions	1/4	4	4	0	0
(England) 2016	Second Place	2/4	4	1	2	1
Total	3 Titles	9/9	35	17	15	3

==== Rugby League Pacific Championship ====
Rugby League Pacific Championship record
Year	Round	Position	GP	W	L	D
2019	Second place	2/3	2	1	1	0
2023	Champions	1/3	3	2	1	0
2024	Third place	3/3	3	1	2	0
Total	1 Titles	2/4	8	4	4	0

== Attendance records ==
=== Highest all-time attendances ===
Attendance	Opposing team	Venue	Tournament
74,468	Australia	Old Trafford, Manchester	2013 Rugby League World Cup Final
67,545	England	Wembley Stadium, London	2013 Rugby League World Cup Semi-Final
56,326	Australia	Sydney Cricket Ground, Sydney	1952 Trans-Tasman series – 1st Test
55,866	Australia	Sydney Cricket Ground, Sydney	1948 Trans-Tasman series – 1st Test
48,330	Australia	Sydney Cricket Ground, Sydney	1963 Trans-Tasman series – 1st Test

=== Highest attendances per opponent ===
Attendance	Opposing team	Venue	Tournament
74,468	Australia	Old Trafford, Manchester	2013 Rugby League World Cup Final
67,545	England	Wembley Stadium, London	2013 Rugby League World Cup Semi-Final
42,685	(United Kingdom) England*	Odsal Stadium, Bradford	1947–48 Kiwis Tour – 3rd Test
42,344	Wales	Wembley Stadium, London	2011 Rugby League Four Nations
38,114	Tonga	Eden Park, Auckland	2025 Pacific Championships
30,431	France	Stade Vélodrome, Marseille	1965 Kiwis Tour – 1st Test
24,868	Cook Islands	Te Kaha, Christchurch	2026 Rugby League World Cup
23,659	Fiji	Robina Stadium, Gold Coast	2026 Rugby League World Cup
23,269	Samoa	Eden Park, Auckland	2023 Pacific Championships
18,180	Papua New Guinea	Headingley, Leeds	2013 Rugby League World Cup
14,044	Ireland	Headingley, Leeds	2021 Rugby League World Cup
12,130	Scotland	Headingley, Leeds	2013 Rugby League World Cup
6,829	Jamaica	Hull City Stadium, Hull	2021 Rugby League World Cup
5,453	Lebanon	Headingley, Leeds	2021 Rugby League World Cup

* Great Britain played as England in 1947

=== Highest attendances per opponent in New Zealand ===
Attendance	Opposing team	Venue	Tournament
47,363	Australia	Eden Park, Auckland	1985–1988 Rugby League World Cup Final
38,114	Tonga	Eden Park, Auckland	2025 Pacific Championships
34,000	(United Kingdom) Northern Union*	The Domain, Auckland	1920 Great Britain Lions tour – 1st Test
24,868	Cook Islands	Te Kaha, Christchurch	2026 Rugby League World Cup
23,269	Samoa	Eden Park, Auckland	2023 Pacific Championships
20,681	England	Wellington Regional Stadium, Wellington	2010 Rugby League Four Nations
20,500	France	Carlaw Park, Auckland	1955 French Rugby League tour – 1st Test
12,713	Fiji	Wellington Regional Stadium, Wellington	2017 Rugby League World Cup
12,130	Scotland	Rugby League Park, Christchurch	2017 Rugby League World Cup
11,500	Papua New Guinea	Rotorua International Stadium, Rotorua	2010 Rugby League Four Nations
9,368	Wales	Carlaw Park, Auckland	1975 Rugby League World Cup

* Great Britain played as Northern Union in 1920

== Honours ==
- World Cup: 2008
- Tri-Nations/Four Nations: 2010, 2014
- Pacific Championship: 2023, 2025
- Anzac Test: 1998, 2015
- Baskerville Shield: 2019

== IRL Rankings ==
IRL Men's World Rankings
Official rankings as of August 2026
Rank	Change	Team	Pts %
1	Steady	Australia	100
2	Steady	New Zealand	82
3	Steady	Tonga	70
4	Steady	Samoa	56
5	Steady	England	54
6	Steady	Papua New Guinea	47
7	Steady	Fiji	34
8	▲1	Cook Islands	24
9	▲2	Netherlands	23
10	▲2	Ukraine	21
11	▼3	France	21
12	▼2	Serbia	20
13	Steady	Wales	18
14	Steady	Ireland	17
15	Steady	Greece	14
16	Steady	Malta	14
17	▲12	Canada	13
18	▼1	Italy	11
19	▼1	Jamaica	9
20	▲7	Scotland	8
21	▲1	United States	8
22	▼3	Poland	7
23	▼3	Lebanon	7
24	▼1	Germany	7
25	▼1	Czech Republic	6
26	▼5	Norway	6
27	▼2	Chile	5
28	▲2	Philippines	5
29	▼1	South Africa	4
30	Steady	Brazil	3
31	Steady	Morocco	3
32	▲1	Argentina	3
33	▲2	Ghana	2
34	▲2	Kenya	2
35	▼1	Montenegro	2
36	▲1	Nigeria	2
37	▼5	North Macedonia	1
38	Steady	Albania	1
39	Steady	Turkey	1
40	Steady	Bulgaria	1
41	Steady	Cameroon	0
42	Steady	Japan	0
43	Steady	Spain	0
44	Steady	Colombia	0
45	Steady	Russia	0
46	Steady	El Salvador	0
47	Steady	Bosnia and Herzegovina	0
48	Steady	Hong Kong	0
49	Steady	Solomon Islands	0
50	Steady	Vanuatu	0
51	Steady	Hungary	0
52	Steady	Latvia	0
53	Steady	Denmark	0
54	Steady	Belgium	0
55	Steady	Estonia	0
56	Steady	Sweden	0
57	Steady	Niue	0
Complete rankings at www.internationalrugbyleague.com

== New Zealand A ==
New Zealand are also represented by a second-string representative team called "New Zealand A".

- New Zealand A def. Australian Invitational XIII 48–18 (22 October 2006)
- New Zealand A def. Australian Invitational XIII 40–16 (15 October 2005)

Between 2002 and 2003 the New Zealand Residents were referred to as New Zealand 'A'

- National League 1 Representative def. New Zealand A 40–28 (2 November 2003)
- Great Britain def. New Zealand A 52–18 (29 October 2003)
- Warrington Wolves def. New Zealand A 28–26 (26 October 2003)
- National League 2 Representative def. New Zealand A 27–6 (22 October 2003)
- New Zealand A drew Cumbria 24–24 (19 October 2003)
- New Zealand A def. USA 74–4 (6 October 2002)
- France def. New Zealand A (29 September 2002)

== See also ==
- Rugby league in New Zealand
- New Zealand Rugby League
- Junior Kiwis
- New Zealand Māori rugby league team
- New Zealand national rugby union team
