= Road Hockey Rumble =

- Created by: Calum MacLeod; Mark McGuckin
- Starring: Calum MacLeod; Mark McGuckin
- Country of origin: Canada
- No. of episodes: 26

Production
- Running time: 30 min.

Original release
- Network: OLN
- Release: January 10, 2007 – March 31, 2008

Road Hockey Rumble is a half-hour reality series produced by Paperny Entertainment and broadcast on OLN. The series uses a documentary format but crosses over into the genres of sports, travel, and comedy. It follows two Canadian hosts, Calum MacLeod and Mark McGuckin playing their way across Canada in a 13-game grudge match series of Road Hockey. From British Columbia to Newfoundland and all of the territories, they tap into the rivalries, legends and grit of Canada's most colourful and competitive towns. Friends in life but rivals in hockey, each host drafts their own team of locals to battle it out on the court.

A number of past and present NHL hockey players have made appearances or been showcased in the series including Jordin Tootoo, Jason King, Wade Redden, Eric Staal, David Ling, Duane Sutter, Éric Bélanger, Terry Ryan, Tyler Arnason and Eric Chouinard. The show has also featured Canadian Gold Medal Champion Curler Russ Howard and 4 Time World's Strongest Man Magnús Ver Magnússon.

The complete series was released on DVD on July 1, 2009.

== Episodes ==
=== Season I ===
- Trail, British Columbia
  - Rivalry: Trail vs. Fruitvale Winner: Calum
  - Game Score: Trail: 5 Fruitvale: 15 Punishment: Hood Ornament with Tomatoes
- Prince George, British Columbia
  - Rivalry: Tree Cutters vs. Tree Planters Winner: Calum
  - Game Score: Tree Cutters: 2 Tree Planters: 13 Punishment: Blue Stained
- Viking, Alberta
  - Rivalry: Quintons vs. Laskoskys Winner: Mark
  - Game Score: Quintons: 11 Laskoskys: 7 Punishment: Man Steer
- Lloydminster, Alberta/Saskatchewan
  - Rivalry: Saskatchewan vs. Alberta Winner: Mark
  - Game Score: Saskatchewan: 17 Alberta: 12 Punishment: RHR 100 Yard Dash
- Regina, Saskatchewan
  - Rivalry: Brunettes vs. Blondes Winner: Calum
  - Game Score: Brunettes: 1 Blondes: 11 Punishment: Shins of Silk
- Gimli, Manitoba
  - Rivalry: Non-Icelanders vs. Icelanders Winner: Mark
  - Game Score: Non-Icelanders: 8 Icelanders: 7 Punishment: Human Shield
- Thunder Bay, Ontario
  - Rivalry: Port Arthur vs. Fort William Winner: Calum
  - Game Score: Port Arthur: 4 Fort William: 8 Punishment: Firing Squad

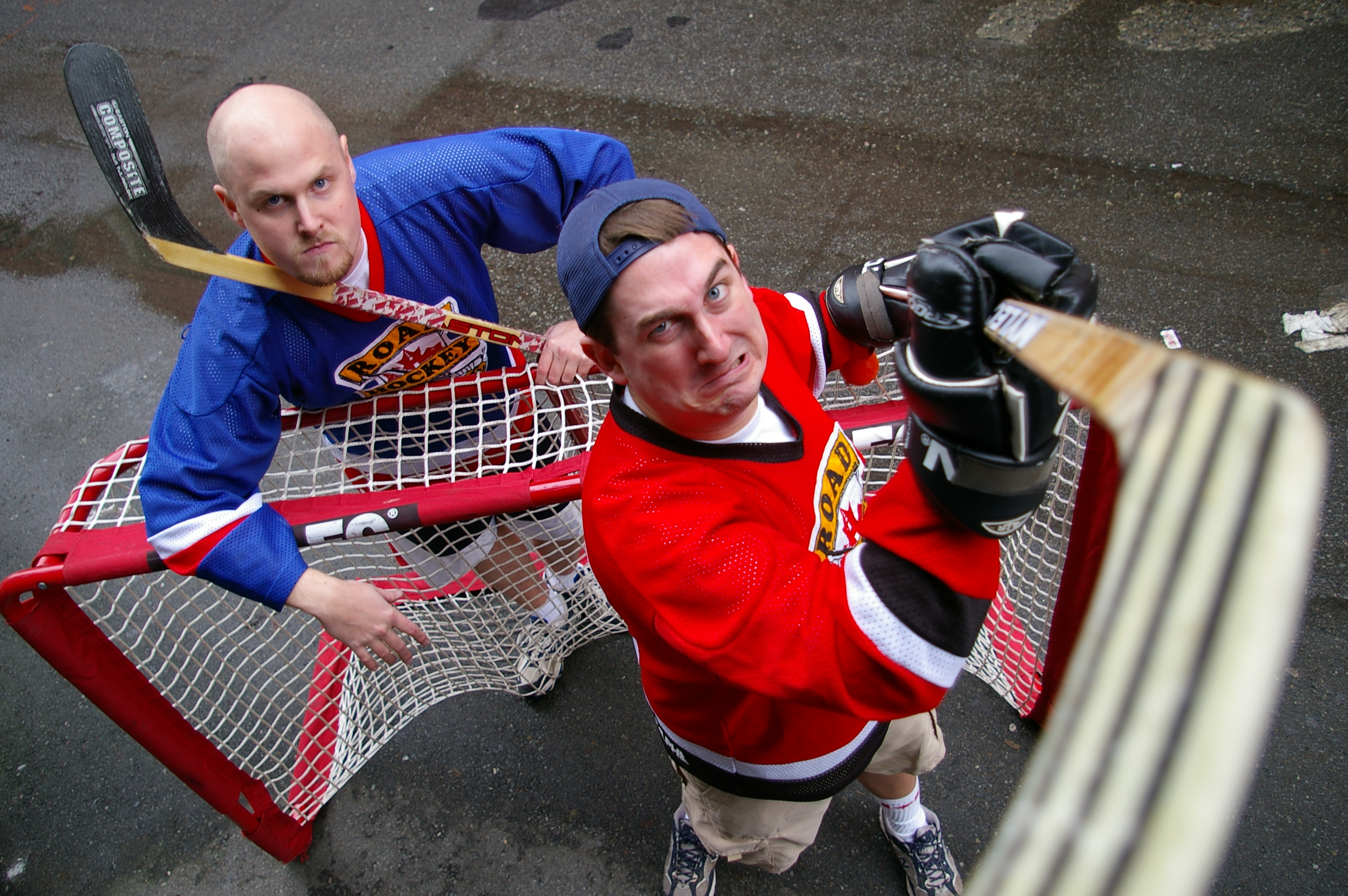
Mark & Calum

- Toronto, Ontario
  - Rivalry: Toronto vs. Canada Winner: Calum
  - Game Score: Toronto: 1 Canada: 3 Punishment: Spic 'N Spanned
- Hudson, Quebec
  - Rivalry: Francophones vs. Anglophones Winner: Calum
  - Game Score: Francophones: 5 Anglophones: 6 Punishment: Maple Roll
- Moncton, New Brunswick
  - Rivalry: Low Tech vs. High Tech Winner: Mark
  - Game Score: Low Tech: 15 High Tech: 0 Punishment: Moncton Takeout
- Summerside, Prince Edward Island
  - Rivalry: Tax Haters vs. Tax Lovers Winner: Calum*
  - Game Score: Tax Haters: 5 Tax Lovers: 9 Punishment: PEI Pinch
- Windsor, Nova Scotia
  - Rivalry: Believers vs. Skeptics Winner: Mark*
  - Game Score: Believers: 5 Skeptics: 1 Punishment: Pumpkin of Death
- St. John's, Newfoundland
  - Rivalry: Townies vs. Baymen Winner: Mark
  - Game Score: Townies: 7 Baymen: 5 Punishment: Triple Threat

=== Season II ===
- Corner Brook, Newfoundland
  - Rivalry: Fire vs. Fuzz Winner: Mark
  - Game Score: Fire: 8 Fuzz: 7 Punishment: Newfie Scrub Down
- Tatamagouche, Nova Scotia
  - Rivalry: Tall vs. Short Winner: Calum
  - Game Score: Tall: 6 Short: 7 Punishment: Tatmagouche Fooooore!
- Charlottetown, Prince Edward Island
  - Rivalry: Lactose Intolerant vs. Dairy Lovers Winner: Mark
  - Game Score: Lactose Intolerant: 4 Dairy Lovers: 3 Punishment: Charlottetown S#*t Crow
- St. Stephen, New Brunswick
  - Rivalry: America vs. Canada Winner: Mark
  - Game Score: Americans: 5 Canadians: 8 Punishment: 1812 Barrage
- Quebec City, Quebec
  - Rivalry: Anglophones vs. Francophones Winner: Calum
  - Game Score: Anglophones: 4 Francophones: 6 Punishment: RHR Casualty of War
- Niagara-on-the-Lake, Ontario
  - Rivalry: Wine vs. Beer Winner: Calum
  - Game Score: Wine: 2 Beer: 6 Punishment: RHR Blaaaah
- Winnipeg, Manitoba
  - Rivalry: U. of M. vs. U. of W. Winner: Calum
  - Game Score: U. of M. 3 U. of W. 4 Punishment: RHR Suicide Pass
- Rankin Inlet, Nunavut
  - Rivalry: Cooked Food Eaters vs. Raw Food Eaters Winner: Mark
  - Game Score: Cooked 10 Raw 7 Punishment: Rankin Inlet High Kick
- Moose Jaw, Saskatchewan
  - Rivalry: Team Bootlegger vs. Team Ethical Winner: Calum
  - Game Score: Bootlegger 2 Ethical 7 Punishment: Taste of Own Medicine
- Red Deer, Alberta
  - Rivalry: Oilers Fans vs. Flames Fans Winner: Calum
  - Game Score: Oilers Fans 7 Flames Fans 12 Punishment: Greasy Hooter
- Yellowknife, Northwest Territories
  - Rivalry: Irish vs. Falcons Winner: Calum*
  - Game Score: Irish 8 Falcons 3 Punishment: Man Fish
- Dawson City, Yukon
  - Rivalry: Cheechakos vs. Sourdoughs Winner: Calum
  - Game Score: Cheechakos 3 Sourdoughs 13 Punishment: Dawson City White Out
- Maple Ridge, British Columbia
  - Rivalry: Mark Lovers vs. Mark Haters Winner: Mark
  - Game Score: Mark Lovers 7 Mark Haters 5 Punishment: The Unspeakable Punishment

== Awards ==
=== 2007 Gemini Awards ===
- Road Hockey Rumble for Best General/Human Interest Series - Nominated

=== 2007 Leo Awards ===
- Dwayne Beaver - Best Direction in a Music, Comedy, or Variety Program or Series - Won
- Road Hockey Rumble - Best Music, Comedy, or Variety Program or Series - Nominated
- Mark McGuckin and Calum MacLeod - Best Performance or Host(s) in a Music, Comedy, or Variety Program or Series - Nominated
- Mark McGuckin and Calum MacLeod - Best Screenwriting in a Music, Comedy, or Variety Program or Series - Nominated

=== 2008 Leo Awards ===
- Road Hockey Rumble - Best Music, Comedy, or Variety Program or Series - Won
- Dennis Ryan - Best Picture Editing in a Music, Comedy, or Variety Program or Series - Won
- Mark McGuckin and Calum MacLeod - Best Screenwriting in a Music, Comedy, or Variety Program or Series - Won
- Dwayne Beaver - Best Direction in a Music, Comedy, or Variety Program or Series - Nominated
- Brent Belke - Best Musical Score in a Music, Comedy, or Variety Program or Series - Nominated
- Calum MacLeod and Mark McGuckin - Best Performance or Host(s) in a Music, Comedy, or Variety Program or Series - Nominated
- Joel Norn - Best Picture Editing in a Music, Comedy, or Variety Program or Series - Nominated
