= Tom Geldart =

English footballer

Personal information
- Full name: Thomas Septimus Geldart
- Date of birth: 15 February 1905
- Place of birth: Barrow, England
- Date of death: 1985 (aged 79–80)
- Positions: Left-half; inside left

Senior career*
Years	Team	Apps	(Gls)
1927–1928	Barrow Novocastrians		
1928–1930	Barrow	2	(0)
- Egremont
- Kendal Town
?–1934	Crow Nest Sports		
- * Club domestic league appearances and goals

Thomas Septimus Geldart (15 February 1905 – 1985) was an English footballer who played as a left-half or inside-left. He made two appearances in the Football League for Barrow.
