= Colum Kenny =

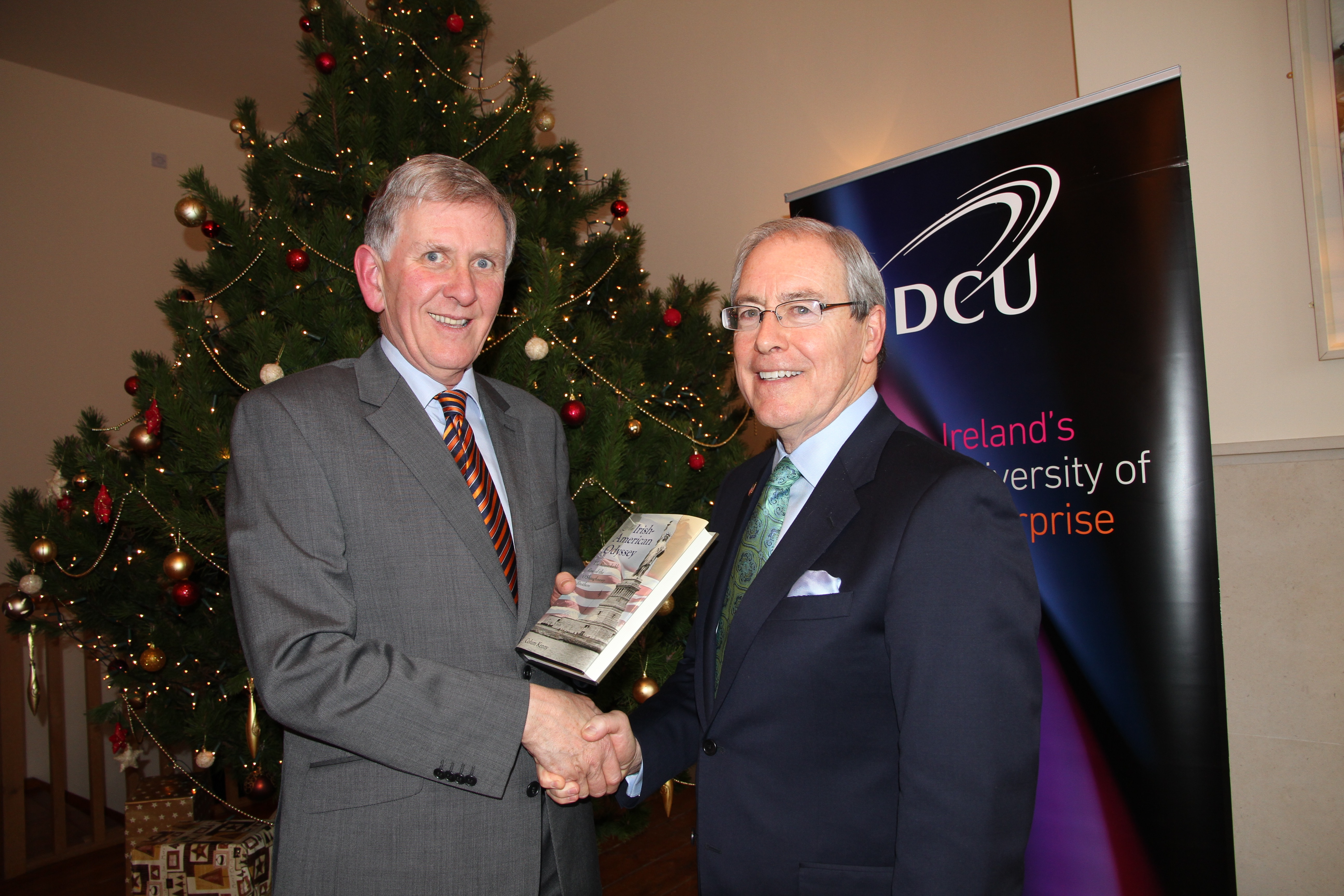
- Kenny and US ambassador Kevin O'Malley at the launch of "Irish American Odyssey"
- Occupations: Journalist, barrister and historian
- Known for: Emeritus Professor at Dublin City University (DCU), in Dublin, Ireland
- Notable work: The Enigma of Arthur Griffith

Colum Kenny is a journalist, barrister and historian. He is Emeritus Professor at Dublin City University (DCU), in Dublin, Ireland. He was formerly chair of the Masters in Journalism programme at DCU in the School of Communications 1982-2015.

Kenny was a member of the Broadcasting Authority of Ireland 2010-2015 and of the Broadcasting Commission of Ireland/IRTC 1998-2003. A former employee of RTE, he was a founding board member of the E.U. Media Desk in Ireland and is a council member of the Irish Legal History Society. He was a member of the Media Mergers Advisory Group that reported to the Minister for Enterprise, Trade and Employment in 2008. The author of many academic articles on cultural and media matters, he is also a member of the National Union of Journalists and a frequent contributor to media debates and a consultant on communications.

His books include a biography of Arthur Griffith and a book on the signing of the Anglo-Irish Treaty.

== Awards ==
Kenny was awarded the DCU President's Award for Research in the Humanities and Social Sciences, 2004/5.

In 2018 he was awarded the Gold Medal of the Irish Legal History Society.

== Published works ==
Books by Colum Kenny include:

- Midnight in London: The Anglo-Irish Treaty Crisis 1921, Eastwood Books, 2021.
- The Enigma of Arthur Griffith, Merrion Press, 2020.
- An Irish-American Odyssey: The Remarkable Rise of the O'Shaughnessy Brothers, University of Missouri Press, 2014.
- Changes in Practice and Law: Essays to Mark Twenty-Five Years of the Irish Legal History Society, ed. C. Kenny and D. Hogan. Four Courts Press, Dublin, 2013.
- The Power of Silence: Silent Communication in Daily Life, Karnac, London, 2011.
- Moments that Changed Us [Ireland since 1973], Gill & Macmillan, 2005.
- Fearing Sellafield, Gill & Macmillan, 2003.
- Battle of the Books, 1972 Cultural Controversy at a Dublin Library, Four Courts Press, 2002.
- Molaise abbot of Leighlin and Hermit of Holy Island: The Life and Legacy of St Laisren in Ireland and Scotland, Morrigan Books, 1998.
- The Role of Believing Communities in Building Peace in Ireland, Glencree Centre for Peace and Reconciliation., 1998.
- Tristram Kennedy and the Revival of Irish Legal Training, 1835-1885, Irish Academic Press, 1996.
- Kilmainham: The History of a Settlement Older than Dublin, Four Courts Press, 1995.
- Standing on Bray Head: Hoping it Might Be So, Kestral Books, 1995.
- King's Inns and the Kingdom of Ireland: the Irish 'Inn of Court' 1541-1800, Irish Academic Press, 1992.
