= Enrique Colom =

Spanish Catholic priest and theologian

Enrique Colom Costa (August 6, 1941) is a Spanish-born naturalised Chilean Catholic priest and theologian.

== Biography ==
Enrique Colom was born in Alicante, Spain on 6 August 1941. He is an industrial engineer (1965) from the Technical University of Madrid, and a doctor in industrial engineering (1971) from the Universidad Politécnica de Barcelona (nowadays Polytechnic University of Catalonia).

He was ordained priest of the Prelature of the Holy Cross and Opus Dei, on 4 August 1974.

The following year, he obtained the Doctorate in Theology in the University of Navarra.

He was among the professors who began, in 1984, the Pontifical University of the Holy Cross, where he taught Moral Theology from 1985 to 2011. During his years at the Pontifical University of the Holy Cross he served as Dean of the Theology Department and Director of Studies.

He was appointed an ordinary member of the Pontifical Academy of St. Thomas Aquinas in 2002, a Consultor of the Pontifical Council for Justice and Peace in 2003, and a counselor of the Apostolic Penitentiary in 2010.

Colom is an author of several books on Moral Theology and Catholic social teaching. He also contributed as an editor to the Compendium of the Social Doctrine of the Church. Together with Bishop Giampaolo Crepaldi, secretary of the Pontifical Council for Justice and Peace, he was coordinator of Dictionary of the Social Doctrine of the Church, which has been described as a "common spelling book" in the face of "illiteracy on the basic categories of the social doctrine of the Church."

Colom was a member of the Scientific Committee of the International Observatory Card. Van Thuân which promotes the social doctrine of the Church at an international level.

In 2011 he moved from Italy to Chile and started a collaboration with the University of the Andes, Chile.

He is a naturalised Chilean.

== Works ==
- Dios y el obrar humano, Pamplona: Eunsa, 1976, 202 pp. (“Colección Teológica” n. 15) ISBN 978-8431302481
- P. Baran-P. Sweez y: la economía política del crecimiento y el capital monopolista, Madrid: Emesa, 1979 220 pp. (“Colección Crítica Filosófica” n. 27). ISBN 978-8426553263
- El trabajo en Juan Pablo II, Madrid: Unión Editorial, 1995, 117 pp. (in contribution with F. Wurmser). ISBN 978-8472092853
- Chiesa e società, Roma: Armando, 1996, 416 pp. (Collana Studi di Teologia, 2). ISBN 978-8871445816
- Santità cristiana e carità politica, Ed. Eco, S. Gabriele-Colledara 1999, pp. 242. ISBN 978-8887306101
- Scelti in Cristo per essere santi, Apollinare Studi, Roma 1999, pp. 396 (in contribution with A. Rodríguez Luño). 2nd ed.: 2002 (pp. 337). 3d ed.: 2003 (pp. 425). ISBN 978-8883330865
- Elegidos en Cristo para ser santos, Palabra, Madrid 2001, pp. 515 (is a new edition of the precedent book, with some changes). ISBN 978-8482394947
- Curso de Doctrina Social de la Iglesia, Palabra, Madrid 2001, pp. 299. 2ª ed. Updated: 2006. ISBN 978-8482395234
- Dizionario di dottrina sociale della Chiesa, LAS, Roma 2005, pp. 839 (in contribution with G. Crepaldi). ISBN 978-8834305881

Colom wrote some articles about Moral Theology and the Catholic social teaching in "Scripta Theologica" (Pamplona), "Gran Enciclopedia Rialp" (Madrid), "Annales Theologici" (Roma), "Filosofar Cristiano" (Córdoba, Argentina) and "Tierra Nueva" (Bogotá), among others.

He also collaborated in numerous works such as:

- La misión del laico en la Iglesia y en el mundo, Eunsa, Pamplona 1987.
- La pace: sfida all'Università Cattolica, Herder-Fiuc, Roma 1988.
- Persona, verità e morale, Città Nuova, Roma 1988.
- Teologia e scienze nel mondo contemporaneo, Massimo, Milano 1989.
- Estudios sobre la Encíclica “Sollicitudo rei socialis”, Unión Editorial, Madrid 1990.
- Doctrina Social de la Iglesia y realidad socio-económica, Eunsa, Pamplona 1991.
- Estudios sobre la Encíclica “Centesimus annus”, Unión Editorial, Madrid 1992.
- Etica e poetica in Karol Wojtyla, S.E.I., Torino 1997.
- El cristiano en el mundo, Servicio de Publicaciones de la Universidad de Navarra, Pamplona 2003.
- Per un umanesimo degno dell’amore: il “Compendio della dottrina sociale della Chiesa”, LAS, Roma 2005
- Teologia ed etica politica, Libreria Editrice Vaticana, Città del Vaticano 2005.

== Other resources ==
- Cardinal Van Thuan Observatory
- Curriculum Vitae at the Universitat Abat Oliba CEU
- Interview on St. Josemaria Escriva and on Social Doctrine
- Pontifical Council for Justice and Peace
