= William St Colum Bland =

British Army officer (1868–1950)

Brigadier-General William St Colum Bland CB CMG
- Bland in 1918
- Born: 6 June 1868; Woolwich, Kent, England
- Died: 9 February 1950 (aged 81); Winchester, Hampshire, England
- Military career
- Allegiance: United Kingdom
- Branch: British Army
- Service years: 1887–1920
- Rank: Brigadier-General
- Unit: Royal Artillery
- Conflicts: Anglo-Manipur War, Waziristan Expedition, Boxer Rebellion, First World War
- Awards: CB, CMG

Brigadier-General William St Colum Bland CB CMG (6 June 1868 – 9 February 1950) was a senior British Army officer during the First World War.

== Biography ==
Born on 6 June 1868, William St Colum Bland was educated at Bedford School. He received his first commission in the Royal Artillery in 1887, and served during the Anglo-Manipur War in British India, between 1891 and 1892. He served during the Waziristan Expedition, between 1894 and 1895, was promoted to the rank of Captain in 1897, and served during the Boxer Rebellion in 1900. He was promoted to the rank of Major in 1906, and appointed as an instructor in the School of Gunnery, between 1906 and 1909, and as Superintendent of Experiments, between 1909 and 1913. He served during the First World War between 1914 and 1918, and was President of the Ordnance Committee at the Ministry of Munitions between 1916 and 1919.

Brigadier General William St Colum Bland was appointed a Companion of the Order of the Bath in 1917, and a Companion of the Order of St Michael and St George in 1919. He retired from the British Army in 1920 and died on 9 February 1950, aged 81.
