= Callum Smith (disambiguation) =

Callum Smith may refer to:

- Callum Smith (born 1990), British professional boxer
- Callum Smith (skier) (born 1992), British cross-country skier
- Callum Smith (footballer) (born 1999), Scottish footballer for Raith Rovers
- Callum Smith (badminton) (born 2002), Scottish badminton player
