= Callum Milne =

Scottish footballer

Personal information
- Full name: Callum Milne
- Date of birth: 27 August 1965 (age 61)
- Place of birth: Edinburgh, Scotland
- Position: Right back

Senior career*
| Years | Team | Apps | (Gls) |
| 1984–1993 | Hibernian | 79 | (0) |
| 1993–1998 | Partick Thistle | 106 | (2) |
| 1998–2002 | Whitburn | | |
| 2017–present | Patalex United | 10 | (0) |
| Total | | 185 | (2) |
- * Club domestic league appearances and goals

Callum Milne (born 27 August 1965 in Edinburgh) is a Scottish former footballer who played as a right back. Milne spent most of his career with Hibernian, spending nine seasons with the Easter Road club before a five-year spell with Partick Thistle. During his time at Easter Road, Milne picked up a Scottish League Cup winners medal and was a runner-up on a further two occasions. Suffering relegation twice with Thistle, Milne was given a free transfer in 1998, subsequently leaving the senior game to join junior club Whitburn. He played for four years, winning the Scottish Junior Cup before his retirement in December 2002 due to injury. In 2017, Callum came out of retirement to captain PatAlex United FC to Loxam World Cup Glory at The Centre National de Football, Clairefontaine, France

== Honours ==
Hibernian

- Scottish League Cup: 1

1991–92

Whitburn

- Scottish Junior Cup: 1

1999–00

PatAlex United

- Loxam World Cup: 1

2017
