= Jeannie Callum =

Canadian scientist and academic

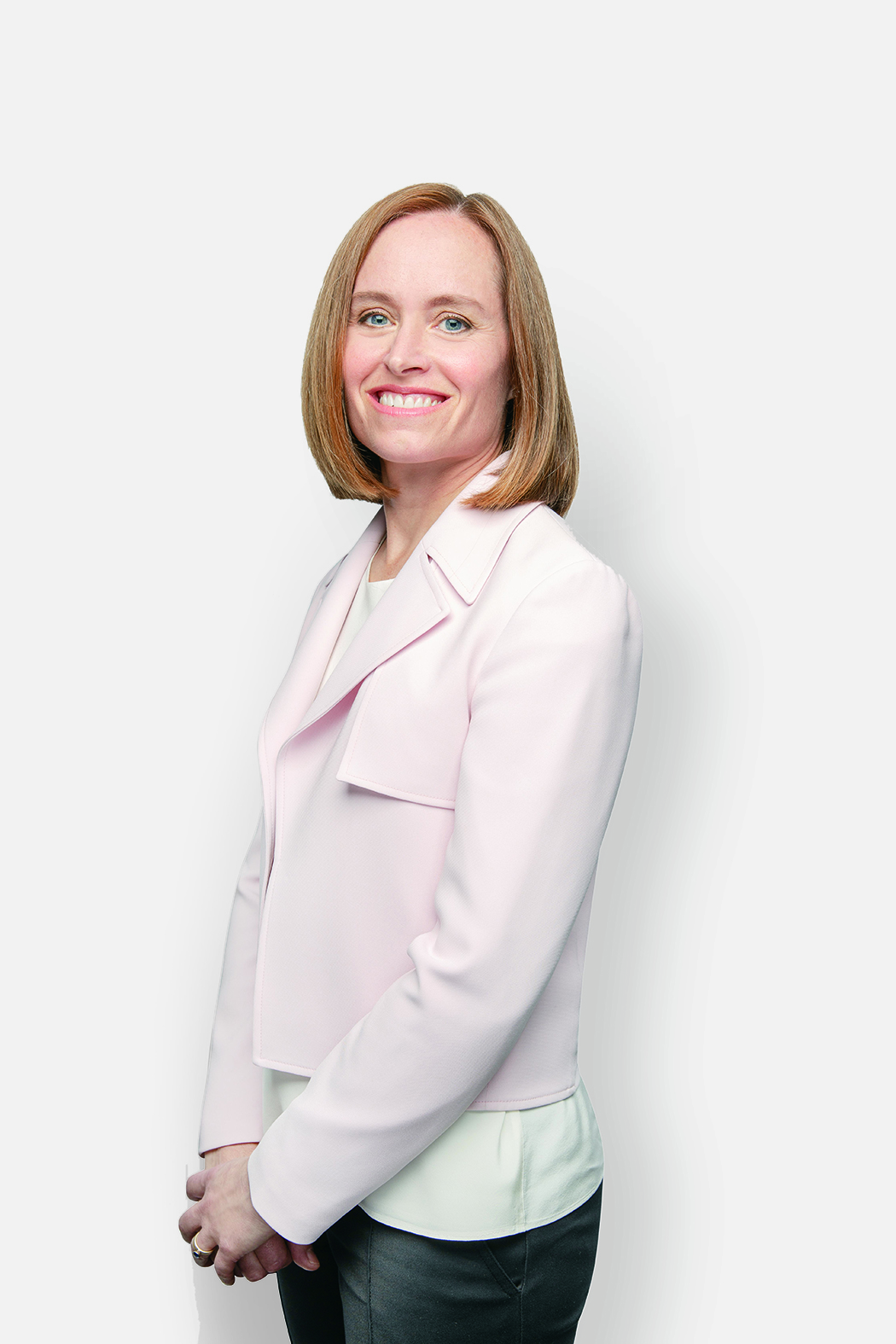
Jeannie Callum

Jeannie Callum is a transfusion medicine specialist and hematologist in Ontario, Canada. She is also a professor at the University of Toronto and Queen's University. She was the co-principal investigator of the CONCOR trial, an international randomized controlled trial evaluating the use of convalescent plasma for the treatment of COVID-19 infection. She was lead editor for Bloody Easy 4: Blood Transfusions, Blood Alternatives and Transfusion Reactions, fourth edition a handbook in transfusion medicine for the province of Ontario.

== Career and research ==
Callum, is a Canadian transfusion medicine specialist and hematologist based in Ontario, where she serves as professor in the Departments of Pathology & Molecular Medicine at Queen’s University and Laboratory Medicine & Pathobiology at the University of Toronto. As Director of Transfusion Medicine at Kingston Health Sciences Centre and an associate scientist at Sunnybrook Research Institute, she has focused on improving blood utilization, tracking transfusion-related errors, and managing coagulopathy in trauma and post-cardiac surgery patients. Callum was co-principal investigator on the CONCOR‑1 trial evaluating convalescent plasma for COVID-19, lead author of Bloody Easy (the Ontario provincial transfusion handbook), and an author or editor of over 150 peer-reviewed publications.
