= Calum MacLeod (producer) =

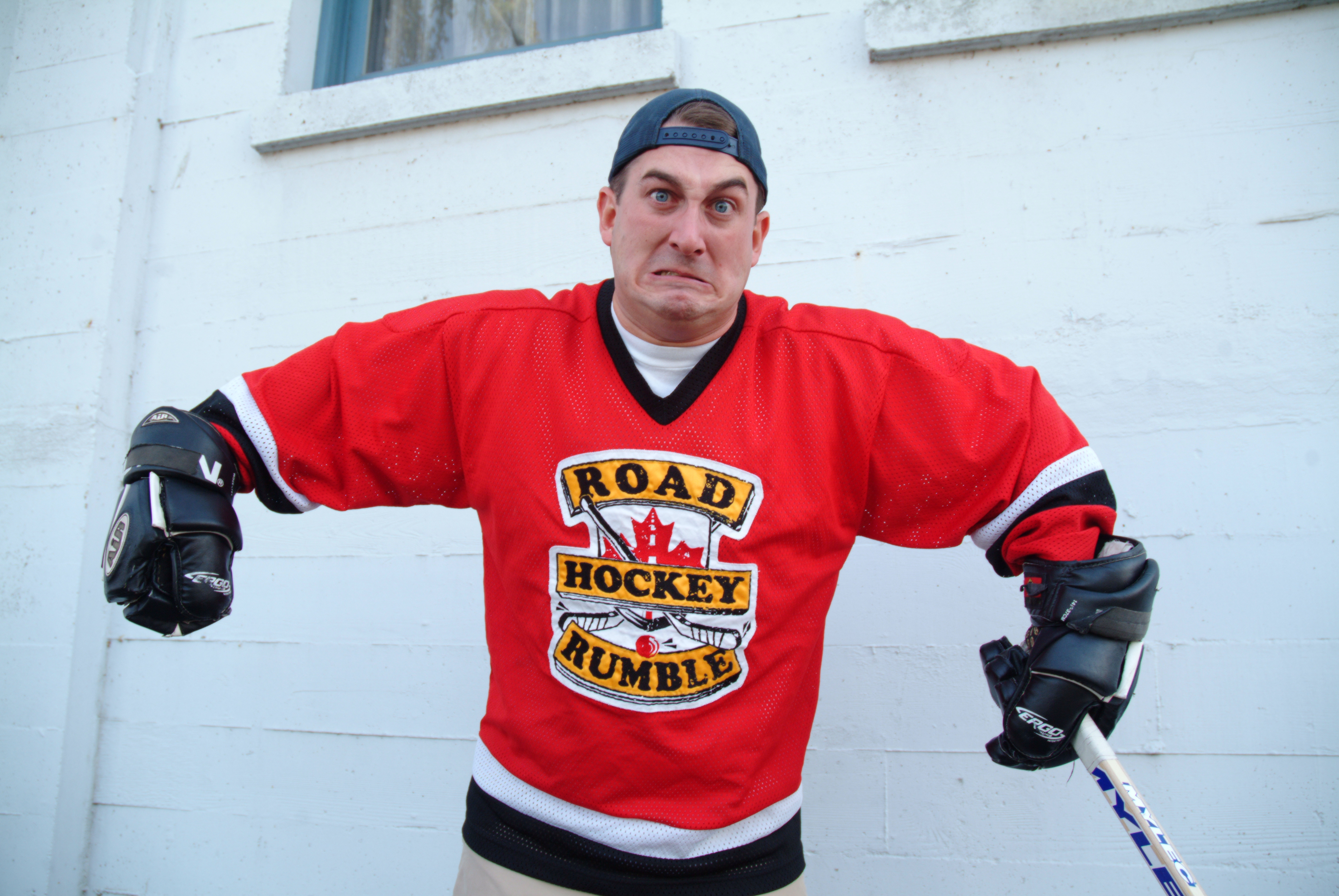
- Calum MacLeod
- Born: April 28, 1981 (age 45); Saint Boniface, Winnipeg, Manitoba

Calum MacLeod is the co-host, creator and creative producer of the Canadian television series Road Hockey Rumble. He was born in the house of Taurus at Winnipeg's St. Boniface Hospital in the Saint Boniface neighbourhood, but spent his early years in Edinburgh, Scotland, before moving back to Winnipeg at the age of nine. Shortly thereafter he was introduced to the game of road hockey when he grabbed one of his neighbour's broken sticks out of the garbage. He played road hockey games in Winnipeg, Prince George, and Vancouver. He played in the University of British Columbia intramurals' Tier Three ball hockey league.

MacLeod majored in Film Production at the University of British Columbia. He produced the 2005 National Screen Institute ZeD Drama Prize film Gravity Boy, which was broadcast on CBC Television in Fall 2006. MacLeod's other credits include being co-producer/D.O.P. of the short film Lyon King (2004), which screened at both the World of Comedy International Film Festival and the Worldwide Short Film Festival; and producer/D.O.P. of the short film Our New Toy (2004), winner of the Most Innovative Film award at the Real 2 Reel Children's Film Festival.
