= Callum Wilson (disambiguation) =

Callum Wilson (born 1992) is an English international footballer.

Callum Wilson may also refer to:

- Callum Wilson (Australian footballer) (born 1988)
- Callum Wilson (rugby union) (born 1990), English rugby union player
- Callum Wilson (footballer, born 1999), Scottish footballer
- Callum Wilson (footballer, born 2004), Northern Irish footballer

== See also ==
- Cal Wilson (1970–2023), New Zealand comedian
