= Roca Colom =

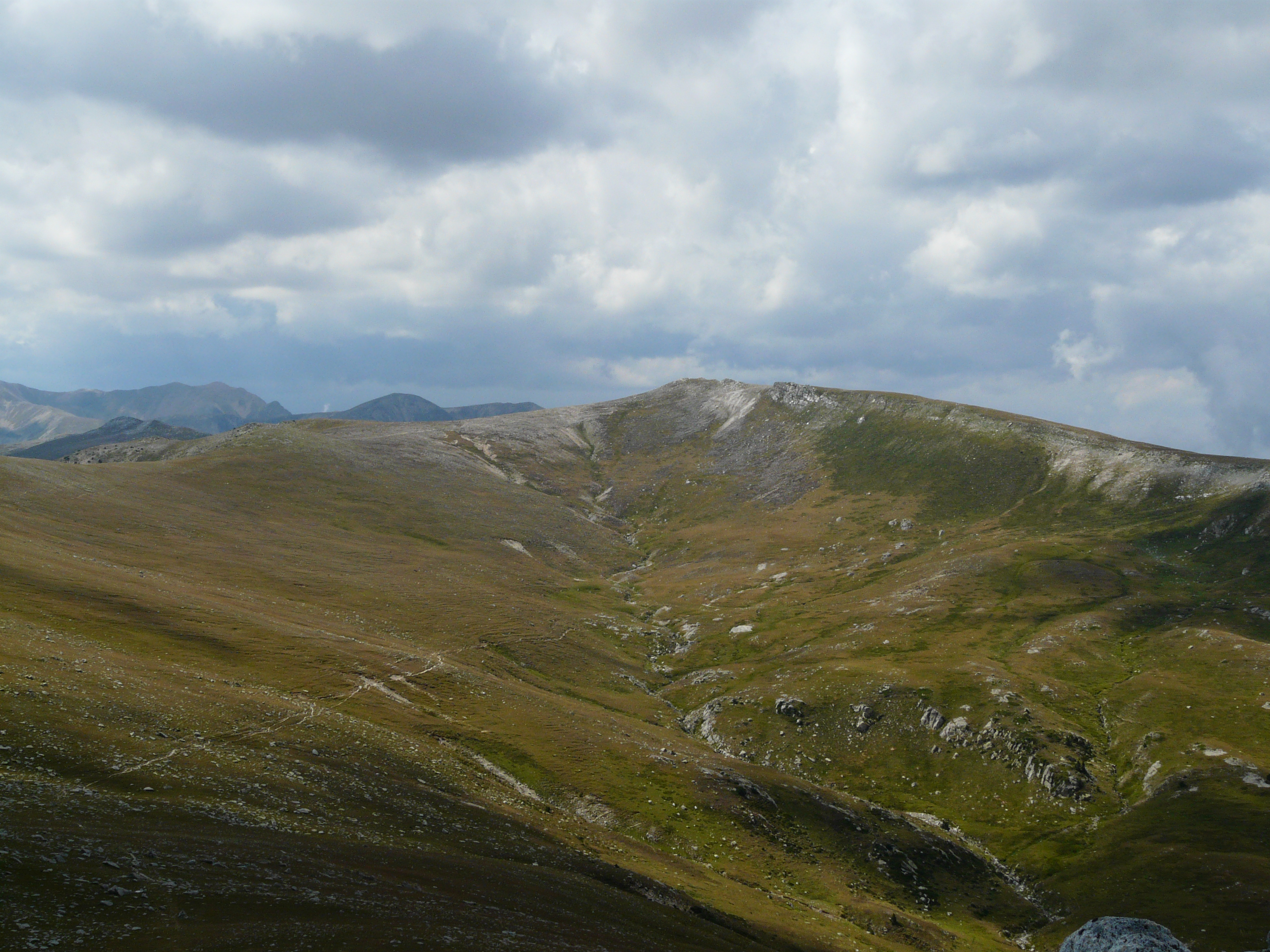

Highest point
- Elevation: 2,506 m (8,222 ft)
- Prominence: 124 m (407 ft)
- Coordinates: 42°25′30″N 02°19′07″E

Geography
- Location within Pyrenees
- Location: Ripollès, Vallespir, Conflent; Catalonia
- Parent range: Pyrenees

Climbing
- First ascent: Unknown
- Easiest route: From Vallter 2000 ski resort

Roca Colom (in Catalan) or Roc Colom (in French) is a mountain of Catalonia. It is located in the Pyrenees, at the border between Spain and France in the area of the Circ del Concròs in the Mentet, Setcases and Prats de Molló municipal terms. The mountain has an elevation of 2,506 metres above sea level.

The name of the mountain means "Pigeon Rock" in the Catalan language.

== See also ==
- Mountains of Catalonia
