= Mr. Manly =

American radio program

Mr. Manly is a comedic American radio program created by Colom Keating in February 1989. It is syndicated on various radio stations in the United States. Mr. Manly, played by Keating, dispenses advice to listeners on what would be the truly "manly" way to react in certain situations.

== Format ==
He usually begins his show with the phrase "HEY HEY HEY Mr Manly here. And now, another edition of how to be manly. Today, lesson number" typically followed by a four or five digit number, suggesting there are thousands and thousands of lessons in all.

In each episode, a scenario occurs where the listener's manliness is put in doubt. An example might be, "Your wife asks you to accompany her to a dog show, a decidedly unmanly event." Mr. Manly then asks the audience, "How can this be accomplished in a manly manner?" After encouraging listeners to follow along in their Manly Manual, Mr. Manly suggests three ways to handle the situation. The episode is typically concluded with the assurance, "You can rest assured that she will have no doubts as to what kind of man you really are. Until next time, this is Mr. Manly saying be manly and good day!"

== History ==
Several shows have been collected into "Best Of" CD compilations, books including The Official Manly Manual and The Second Manly Manual, and Mr. Manly Productions also sold Mr. Manly mugs and T-shirts.

According to Mr. Manly's Facebook page, he officially ended Mr. Manly productions on March 2, 2020.

== Manly Manual ==
The Official Manly Manual (ISBN 1-880092-12-3) is a book written in 1993 by Colom Keating which collects numerous lessons from Mr. Manly.
