= Callum (Thrace) =

Settlement and station of ancient Thrace

Coordinates: 41°03′05″N 28°25′06″E

Callum was a settlement and station (mutatio) of ancient Thrace, inhabited during Byzantine times.

Its site is located east of Selymbria in European Turkey.
