= Callum Davies =

Callum Davies may refer to:

- Callum Davies (footballer), English footballer
- Callum Davies (runner) (born 1999), Australian middle-distance runner
