= Albert Henry Baskerville =

New Zealand international rugby league footballer

Albert Baskerville
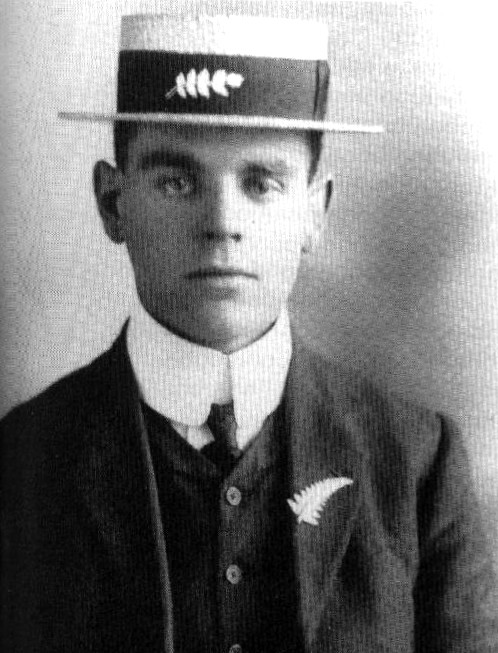

Personal information
- Full name: Albert Henry Baskerville (Note: Historian Sean Fagan notes that the "Baskiville" spelling was used on Baskerville's headstone, but that the "Baskerville" spelling is found in several surviving examples of Baskerville's signature. Fagan contends that the latter was the preferred spelling of Baskerville himself.)
- Born: Albert Henry Baskiville; 15 January 1883 Waiorongomai, Te Aroha, Waikato, New Zealand
- Died: 20 May 1908 (aged 25) Brisbane, Queensland, Australia

Playing information
- Height: 5 ft 10 in (1.78 m)
- Weight: 11 st 12 lb (75 kg)

Rugby union
- Position: Three-quarters
Club
Years	Team	Pld	T	G	FG	P
1903	Wellington (club)	2	1	0	0	3
1904–07	Oriental	24	7	0	0	21
1904	Post & Telegraph (midweek)	4	6	0	0	18
	Total	30	14	0	0	42
Representative
Years	Team	Pld	T	G	FG	P
1905	Wednesday Reps	1	0	0	0	0

Rugby league
- Position: Wing
Representative
Years	Team	Pld	T	G	FG	P
1907–08	New Zealand	3	2	0	0	6
- Notable work: Modern Rugby Football: New Zealand Methods; Points for the Beginner, the Player, the Spectator
- Parents: Henry William Baskiville (father); Maria Mace (mother)

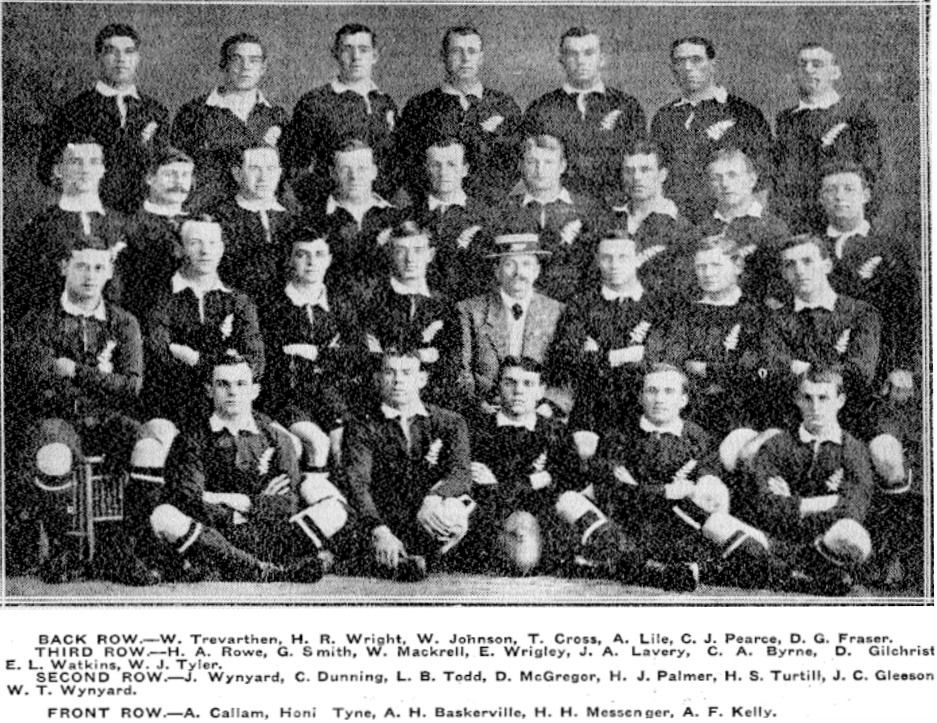
New Zealand Rugby League Team of 1907–08 to Tour England

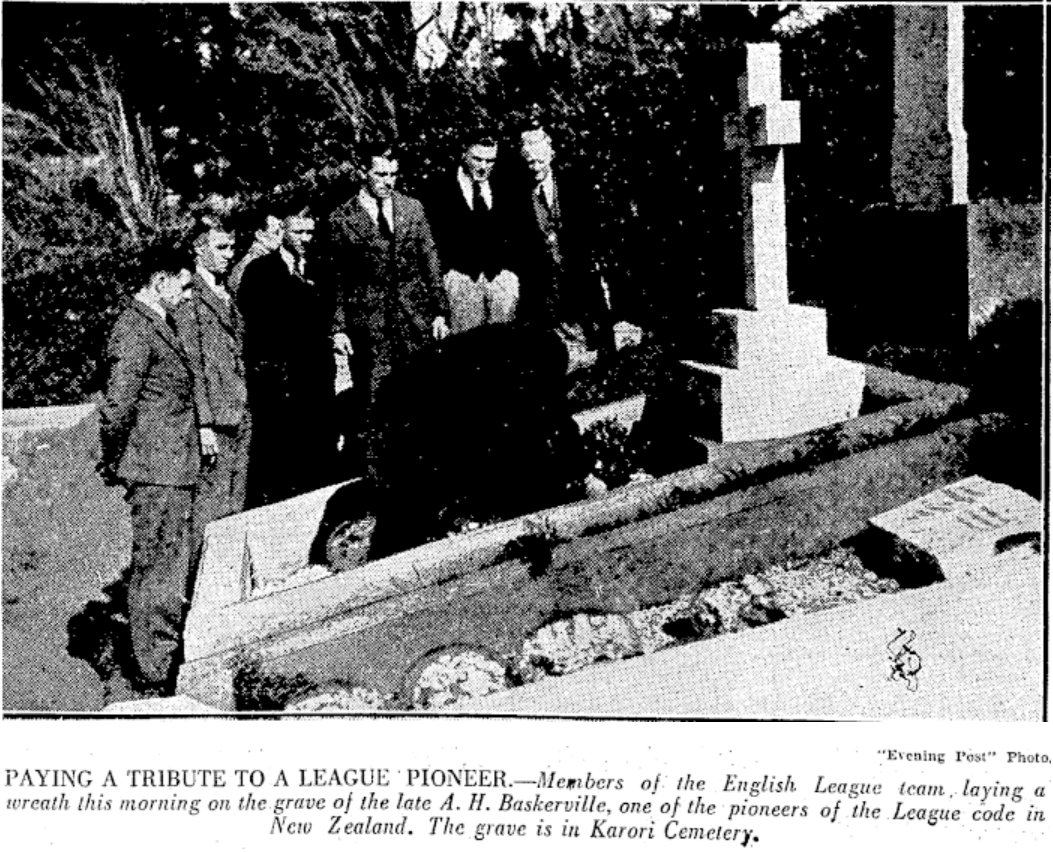
Members of the 1932 English touring side laying a wreath on Albert Baskerville's grave at Karori Cemetery

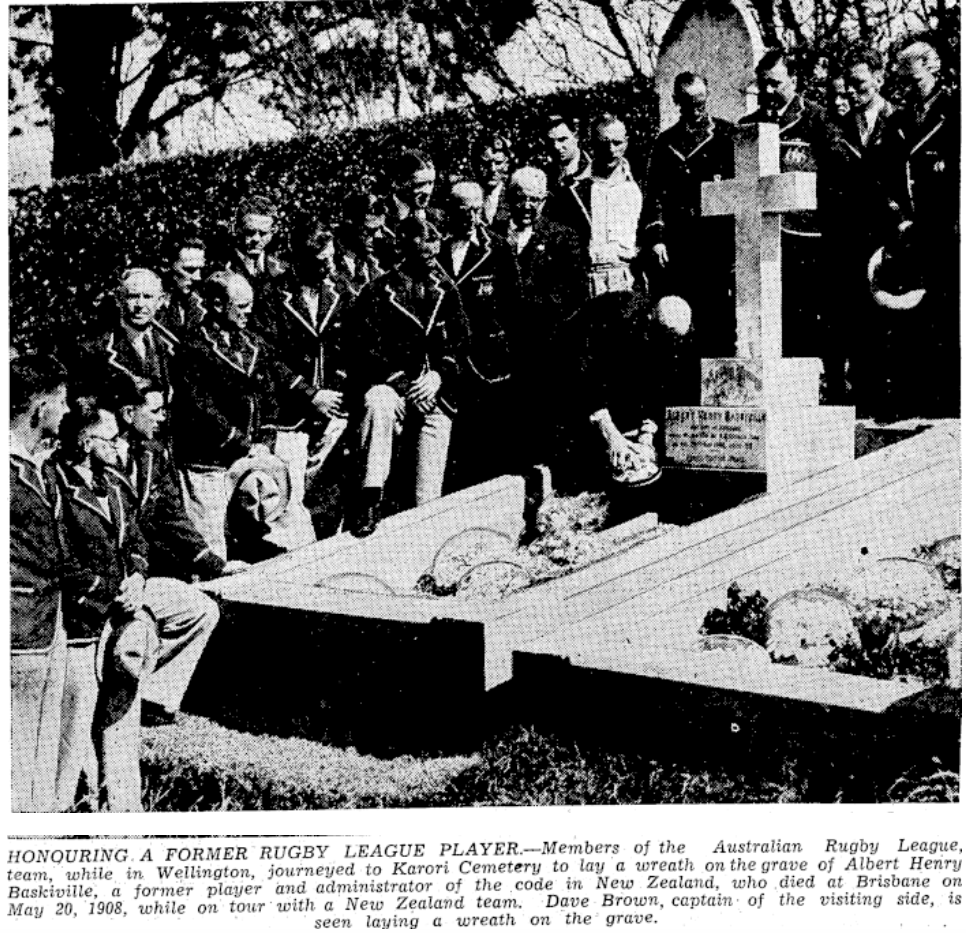

Albert Henry "Bert" Baskerville (born Baskiville; 15 January 1883 – 20 May 1908) was a New Zealand postal clerk, rugby union forward, author of the book Modern Rugby Football: New Zealand Methods; Points for the Beginner, the Player, the Spectator, and a pioneer of rugby league.

== Rugby football ==
His father, Henry William Baskiville, had been killed in an accident on 30 January 1903 when doing some drainage works on Upper Queen Street in Auckland. He and some other workmen were working in a deep excavation when one side of it began to collapse, men called out but his father moved the wrong way and was buried to his neck. He was quickly removed but his injuries were too serious to survive. This left Albert as the main income earner for the family since then and they moved to Wellington shortly afterwards.

Prior to becoming the administrator of the 1907-08 tour, Baskerville played rugby for the Wellington club in 1903 (making two appearances for their senior side) before switching to the Oriental club in 1904 where he played regularly in the backs for the senior side. He was said to be on the verge of provincial selection towards the end of the 1907 season but was not included in the Wellington representative side. He also played for the Post and Telegraph mid-week side in 1904 which won the tournament, beating Cycle and Bearers in the final. In the following year, he represented the Wednesday Players representative side in a match against the Wairarapa Thursday representative side.

His book, Modern Rugby Football: New Zealand Methods; Points for the Beginner, the Player, the Spectator, was published in 1907 and gave him somewhat of a national profile. After the success of this project he moved on to his next ambitious idea, a professional rugby tour of Great Britain. Baskerville competed in many athletic events from 1903 to 1907 as a short and middle-distance runner where he would compete for prize money. In late 1905, he filed a patent for a "cuff protector and blotter".

== The Tour ==
Baskerville wrote to the Northern Union and asked if it would host a touring party of New Zealand rugby players. The Northern Union was excited by this proposal and quickly agreed. Baskerville began to work full-time on organising the tour, leaving his job at the Postal Department and severing his connection with the Oriental Football Club. The Wellington Rugby Union moved quickly to attempt to stop him from attending its grounds and he received a life ban from the New Zealand Rugby Union. Despite this he managed to put together an impressive touring party that included eight All Blacks, including four from the 1905 tour of Great Britain. The team was dubbed the All Golds by the Sydney press, a derogatory play on the New Zealand rugby union team's nickname the All Blacks.

The tour was a great success both financially (each player earned roughly £300) and on the field, where the touring side won consecutive Test series against Great Britain and Australia. For most of the tour, Baskerville was busy with the administration work and it was not until the final game of the British leg, against St Helens R.F.C., that he played, scoring a try. On arriving in Australia he then played in the first ever trans-Tasman test which was the first match by the Australia national rugby league team, again scoring a try. That was to be the only time that Baskerville represented New Zealand in a Test match. Baskerville contracted pneumonia on the ship taking the touring party from Sydney to Brisbane and, after several days in hospital, died aged 25 in Brisbane on 20 May 1908. His body was taken by the manager, Harry Palmer, and a group of players from each province back to Wellington. The rest of the touring party stayed in Australia to complete the remaining fixtures. Like five other members of the touring party, Baskerville is buried at Karori Cemetery.

== Legacy ==
It was he who practically originated the professional Rugby movement in Australasia

— The Sydney Mail, 27 May 1908

On their return from Australia the remaining members of the tour party held a memorial game, the first game of rugby league in New Zealand, and raised £300 for his widowed mother.

The Courtney Goodwill Trophy, international rugby league's first, was presented for the first time in 1936 and depicted Baskiville, along with other pioneering greats of the code, Jean Galia (France), James Lomas (England) and Dally Messenger (Australia).

He is commemorated by the naming of the Baskerville Shield, the trophy awarded when Great Britain and New Zealand meet in test series. In 2001, Baskerville was inducted as one of the NZRL Legends of League.

== See also ==
- 2007 "All Golds" Tour – celebrating the centenary of Baskerville's 1907 Tour.
- History of Rugby League
