= Callum Geldart =

English cricketer (born 1991)

Personal information
- Full name: Callum John Geldart
- Born: 17 December 1991 (age 34); Huddersfield, Yorkshire, England
- Batting: Left-handed
- Bowling: Right-arm medium

Domestic team information
- Years: Team
- 2010–2011: Yorkshire
- FC debut: 10 May 2010 Yorkshire v Loughborough UCCE
- Last FC: 27 April 2011 Yorkshire v Durham MCCU

Career statistics
Competition	First-class
Matches	2
Runs scored	51
Batting average	25.50
100s/50s	0/0
Top score	34
Catches/stumpings	1/–
- Source: Espncricinfo.com, 18 July 2011

Callum John Geldart (born 17 December 1991) is an English first-class cricketer. A left-handed batsman, Geldart is contracted to Yorkshire County Cricket Club, for whom he has played two first-class matches in 2010 and 2011.

Geldart has been with Yorkshire since 2008, and has played for the Yorkshire Academy in the Yorkshire ECB County Premier League, and the Yorkshire Second XI in the Second XI Championship, as well as appearing in a couple of first-class matches for Yorkshire. These were against Loughborough UCCE in May 2010, when Geldart scored 17 runs; and Durham MCC University in April 2011, when he scored 34.

In September 2011, Yorkshire County Cricket Club announced that Geldart had been awarded a 'summer contract'.
