= 1908–09 St Helens R.F.C. season =

- 1908–09 Northern Rugby Football Union season Rank: 17th
- Challenge Cup: First round
- 1908–09 record: Wins: 11; draws: 3; losses: 15
- Points scored: For: 312; against: 421
← 1907–08	List of seasons	1909–10 →

The 1908–09 season was St Helens' 14th in the Northern Rugby Football Union, the 35th in their history. The club finished 17th out of 27 in the NRFU Championship. In the Lancashire League that ran concurrent to the national championship, St Helens finished eighth. In the Challenge Cup, the club were knocked out in the first round by Halifax.

== NRFU Championship ==
	Team	Pld	W	D	L	PF	PA	Pts	Pct
1	Wigan	32	28	0	4	706	207	56	87.50
2	Halifax	34	28	1	5	526	174	57	83.82
3	Oldham	32	26	0	6	488	176	52	81.25
4	Batley	32	23	3	6	412	176	49	76.56
5	Huddersfield	34	21	3	10	504	292	45	66.17
6	Wakefield Trinity	31	20	1	10	471	318	41	66.12
7	Salford	32	20	1	11	455	309	41	64.06
8	Merthyr Tydfil	18	11	1	6	184	156	23	63.88
9	Broughton Rangers	32	19	1	12	420	330	39	60.93
10	Warrington	32	18	2	12	473	266	38	59.37
11	Runcorn	28	16	1	11	271	191	33	58.92
12	Hunslet	32	18	1	13	361	299	37	57.81
13	Hull	34	19	1	14	487	366	39	57.35
14	Ebbw Vale	24	12	1	11	249	269	25	52.08
15	Leeds	32	15	1	16	398	355	31	48.43
16	Hull Kingston Rovers	32	14	1	17	429	423	29	45.31
17	St. Helens	28	11	3	14	312	421	25	44.64
18	York	32	13	1	18	394	510	27	42.18
19	Dewsbury	30	12	1	17	350	324	25	41.66
20	Keighley	30	12	1	17	338	355	25	41.66
21	Leigh	28	11	0	17	214	308	22	39.28
22	Swinton	32	11	1	20	258	440	23	35.93
23	Bradford Northern	32	11	0	21	324	451	22	34.37
24	Mid-Rhondda	18	5	1	12	111	214	11	30.55
25	Rochdale Hornets	30	8	2	20	195	384	18	30.00
26	Barrow	32	9	1	22	245	507	19	29.69
27	Widnes	28	6	3	19	197	359	15	26.78
28	Treherbert	18	4	1	13	81	212	9	25.00
29	Barry	18	3	0	15	76	445	6	16.66
30	Bramley	26	3	0	23	162	582	6	11.53
31	Aberdare	17	1	0	16	134	406	2	5.88
