= Haydn Price =

Welsh footballer

Personal information
- Full name: Ioan Haydn Price
- Date of birth: 1883
- Place of birth: Maerdy, Wales
- Date of death: 7 March 1964
- Place of death: Portsmouth, England
- Positions: Wing half; centre forward

Youth career
- Mardy Corinthians

Senior career*
Years	Team	Apps	(Gls)
1902–1904	Aberdare Athletic		
1904–1907	Aston Villa	0	(0)
1907–1908	Burton United	1	(0)
1908–1909	Wrexham	17	(4)
1909–1910	Leeds City	8	(0)
1910–1911	Shrewsbury Town		
1911–1915	Walsall		
1918–1919	→Tottenham Hotspur (wartime guest)		

International career
1907–1909	Wales	5	(0)

Managerial career
- 1912–1915: Walsall
- 1919–1920: Mid Rhondda
- 1920: Grimsby Town
- 1921–1922: Mid Rhondda
- * Club domestic league appearances and goals

Ioan Haydn Price (1883 – 7 March 1964) was a Welsh footballer who played at wing half or centre forward for various clubs in the period prior to World War I and the Wales national team, before brief spells as a manager with Walsall and Grimsby Town.

== Playing career ==
Price was born at Maerdy in Glamorgan and after playing for Mardy Corinthians joined Aberdare Athletic in 1902, where he played in the 1904 Welsh Cup Final against Druids, losing narrowly 3–2. Price was a schoolteacher by profession and was nicknamed "the Birmingham schoolmaster".

In December 1904, Price joined Aston Villa of the English First Division; at this time, Villa had a large playing staff and Price rarely played for the reserves and never played for the first team. Nonetheless, he was selected for his first Welsh Cap while still playing for Villa's third team. His international debut came in a 1–0 victory over Scotland at the Racecourse Ground, Wrexham on 4 March 1907, with the only goal coming from Grenville Morris.

Described as a "strong sprinter with good distributive ability but faulty shooting", Price was an extremely versatile player who could play at wing half, left wing or as a central forward.

In 1907, Price moved to Burton United where he played just one League game, in Burton's final match before they lost their League status at the end of the 1906–07 season. Price remained with Burton United for a year after they were relegated to the Birmingham & District League, before joining fellow Birmingham and District League club Wrexham at the start of the 1908–09 season. Whilst with Burton, he received his second Welsh cap, in a 1–0 defeat at the Athletic Ground, Aberdare by Ireland on 11 April 1908.

Price spent one season at Wrexham, at the end of which the club won the Welsh Cup, although Price was not a member of the Cup Final eleven. Whilst with Wrexham, he picked up a further three Welsh caps, playing in all Wales' matches in the 1909 British Home Championship.

In the summer of 1909, Price returned to the English Second Division with Leeds City but found it hard to force his way into the first team. After just eight Football League appearances, he left Elland Road at the end of the season to return to the Birmingham League with Shrewsbury Town. He moved on to Walsall in 1911, staying there for four years until he retired having become the club's Secretary/Manager in July 1912. During World War One, Price played for Tottenham Hotspur as a guest, making nine appearances, scoring three goals.

== Management career ==
In 1919, Price became Secretary/Manager of Mid Rhondda, who were based in Tonypandy. Whilst in his first spell as Mid Rhondda's manager, Price helped rescue the career of Jimmy Seed which had stalled during the war; Seed went on to have a long career with Tottenham Hotspur and Sheffield Wednesday as well as making five appearances for England. Other players on Mid Rhondda's books at this time were former England international, Joe Bache and future Wales international, Dai Collier. The club had a successful time in the seven months that Price was manager, winning both the Southern League Division Two and the Welsh League titles.

In July 1920, Price became manager at Grimsby Town; he succeeded H.N. Hickson but unlike his predecessor, he was given responsibility for signing new players and for team selection. He quickly returned to his former club, signing five players including Collier and Bache, as well as Jimmy Carmichael, Albert Irvine and Harry Moody. His spell as manager at Blundell Park was short-lived ending in acrimony in November 1920 when he resigned publicly in a letter to the Grimsby Evening Telegraph citing interference by the board in his team selections.

Price returned to Mid Rhondda in 1921 where he was hit by more controversy when the club failed to pay its players and other debts and was suspended by the Football Association of Wales.

Price died in Portsmouth in March 1964 in his early 80s.
