= 1909–10 St Helens R.F.C. season =

- 1909–10 Northern Rugby Football Union season Rank: 10th
- Challenge Cup: Second round
- 1909–10 record: Wins: 19; draws: 2; losses: 12
- Points scored: For: 468; against: 367
← 1908–09	List of seasons	1910–11 →

The 1909–10 season was St Helens' 15th in the NRFU, the 36th in their history. The club finished 10th out of 28 in the Championship. In the Lancashire League, St Helens finished fifth out of 12. In the Challenge Cup, the club were beaten in the second round by Halifax.

== NRFU Championship ==
	Team	Pld	W	D	L	PF	PA	Pts	Pct
1	Oldham	34	29	2	3	604	184	60	88.23
2	Salford	31	24	1	6	387	210	49	79.03
3	Wigan	30	23	1	6	545	169	47	78.33
4	Wakefield Trinity	32	24	0	8	435	242	48	75
5	Keighley	28	19	0	9	382	242	38	67.85
6	Leeds	34	21	1	12	451	317	43	63.26
7	Warrington	34	20	2	12	408	252	42	61.76
8	Huddersfield	34	21	0	13	477	301	42	61.76
9	Halifax	34	21	0	13	395	269	42	61.76
10	St. Helens	31	18	2	11	468	367	38	61.29
11	Hull Kingston Rovers	35	19	1	15	410	376	39	55.71
12	Leigh	32	15	5	12	218	206	35	54.68
13	Hull	36	19	0	17	456	373	38	52.77
14	Batley	33	16	2	15	313	201	34	51.51
15	Hunslet	32	16	0	16	321	347	32	50
16	Runcorn	30	14	1	15	232	317	29	48.33
17	Ebbw Vale	24	9	2	13	156	211	20	41.66
18	Widnes	28	10	3	15	152	244	23	41.07
19	Rochdale Hornets	32	13	0	19	272	371	26	40.62
20	Dewsbury	30	11	1	18	253	338	23	38.33
21	Swinton	30	10	2	18	203	306	22	36.66
22	Broughton Rangers	34	10	2	22	295	498	22	32.35
23	Bradford Northern	34	9	1	24	176	388	19	27.94
24	York	30	6	1	23	269	473	13	21.66
25	Bramley	29	6	0	23	181	532	12	20.68
26	Barrow	28	5	1	22	146	377	11	19.64
27	Merthyr Tydfil	21	2	1	18	94	354	5	11.9
28	Treherbert	12	0	0	12	55	289	0	0
