= William Higgins (rugby league) =

Wales international rugby league footballer

Personal information
- Full name: William Higgins
- Born: unknown Wales
- Died: unknown

Playing information
- Position: Wing, Centre
Club
Years	Team	Pld	T	G	FG	P
≤1908–≥11	Ebbw Vale
1912–13	Hull FC
	Total	0	0	0	0	0
Representative
Years	Team	Pld	T	G	FG	P
1909	Welsh League XIII	1

William Higgins was a Welsh professional rugby league footballer who played in the 1900s. He played at representative level for Welsh League XIII, and at club level for Ebbw Vale and Hull FC, as a wing or centre.

== Representative honours ==
William Higgins represented Welsh League XIII while at Merthyr Tydfil in the 14–13 victory over Australia at Penydarren Park, Merthyr Tydfil on Tuesday 19 January 1909.
