= Dick Thomas (rugby league) =

Wales international rugby league footballer

Dickie Thomas
Personal information
- Full name: Richard Llewellyn Thomas
- Born: Newport, Wales
- Died: unknown

Playing information

Rugby union
Club
Years	Team	Pld	T	G	FG	P
	Pill Harriers RFC
	Newport RFC
	Total	0	0	0	0	0

Rugby league
- Position: Fullback, Loose forward
Club
Years	Team	Pld	T	G	FG	P
1897–09	Oldham RLFC	363	9	19		65
≤1909–≥09	Aberdare RLFC	≥1
	Total		9	19	0	65
Representative
Years	Team	Pld	T	G	FG	P
1909	Welsh League XIII	1
19??	Lancashire

Dick Thomas (birth unknown – death unknown) was a Welsh professional rugby league footballer who played in the 1900s. He played at representative level for Welsh League XIII, and at club level for Oldham RLFC and Aberdare RLFC, as a forward.

== Representative honours ==
Dick Thomas played as a loose forward for Welsh League XIII in the 14–13 victory over Australia at Penydarren Park, Merthyr Tydfil on Tuesday 19 January 1909.
