= John Foley (rugby league) =

Wales international rugby league footballer

Jack Foley
Personal information
- Full name: John Foley
- Born: 1878 Brynmawr, Wales
- Died: June 1949 (aged c. 70–71) Brynmawr, Wales

Playing information

Rugby union
Club
Years	Team	Pld	T	G	FG	P
≤1908–≤08	Newport RFC

Rugby league
- Position: Forward
Club
Years	Team	Pld	T	G	FG	P
≤1908–≥11	Ebbw Vale
Representative
Years	Team	Pld	T	G	FG	P
1909	Welsh League XIII	1
1908–11	Wales	5	2			4

John Foley (1878 – June 1949) was a Welsh rugby union and professional rugby league footballer who played in the 1900s and 1910s. He played club level rugby union (RU) for Newport RFC, and representative level rugby league (RL) for Wales and Welsh League XIII, and at club level for Ebbw Vale, as a forward.

== Background ==
Jack Foley was born in Brynmawr, Wales, and he died aged c. 70–71 in Brynmawr, Wales.

== International honours ==
Jack Foley won 5 caps for Wales in 1908–1911 while at Ebbw Vale 2-tries 4-points, and represented Welsh League XIII while at Merthyr Tydfil in the 14–13 victory over Australia at Penydarren Park, Merthyr Tydfil on Tuesday 19 January 1909.
