= James Cowmeadow =

English rugby footballer

Jim Cowmeadow
Personal information
- Full name: James George Cowmeadow
- Born: 7 July 1887; Westbury-on-Severn, Gloucestershire, England
- Died: 6 December 1964 (aged 77); York, Yorkshire, England

Playing information

Rugby union
- Position: Three Quarter/Wing
Club
Years	Team	Pld	T	G	FG	P
1906–08	Cinderford R.F.C.
Representative
Years	Team	Pld	T	G	FG	P
	Gloucestershire

Rugby league
- Position: Wing
Club
Years	Team	Pld	T	G	FG	P
1908–09	Merthyr Tydfil
Representative
Years	Team	Pld	T	G	FG	P
1909	Welsh League XIII	1	2	-	-	6

James George Cowmeadow (7 July 1887 – 6 December 1964) was a rugby union and professional rugby league footballer who played in the 1900s. He played representative level rugby union (RU) for Gloucestershire, and at club level for Cinderford R.F.C., and representative level rugby league (RL) for Welsh League XIII, and at club level for Merthyr Tydfil as a wing. In 1910 he signed for York RFC.

== Representative honours ==
Cowmeadow represented Welsh League XIII while at Merthyr Tydfil. He played on the wing in the 14-13 victory over Australia at Penydarren Park, Merthyr Tydfil on Tuesday 19 January 1909, scoring two tries.
