= Ponty Thomas =

Welsh rugby league footballer

Personal information
- Full name: Ponty Thomas
- Born: Wales
- Died: unknown

Playing information
- Position: Centre
Representative
| Years | Team | Pld | T | G | FG | P |
|---|---|---|---|---|---|---|
| 1909 | Welsh League XIII | 1 |

Ponty Thomas (birth unknown – death unknown) was a Welsh professional rugby league footballer who played in the 1900s. He played at representative level for Welsh League XIII, as a centre.

== Representative honours ==
Ponty Thomas played at centre for Welsh League XIII in the 14–13 victory over Australia at Penydarren Park, Merthyr Tydfil on Tuesday 19 January 1909.
