= Dan Lewis (rugby league) =

Wales international rugby league footballer

Personal information
- Full name: Daniel Lewis
- Born: Wales
- Died: unknown

Playing information
- Position: Forward
Club
Years	Team	Pld	T	G	FG	P
≤1909–≥10	Merthyr Tydfil
1910–≥10	York
	Total	0	0	0	0	0
Representative
Years	Team	Pld	T	G	FG	P
1909	Welsh League XIII	1
1910	Wales	1

Dan Lewis (birth unknown – death unknown) was a Welsh professional rugby league footballer who played in the 1900s and 1910s. He played at representative level for Wales and Welsh League XIII, and at club level for Merthyr Tydfil and York, as a forward.

== International honours ==
Dan Lewis won a cap for Wales while at Merthyr Tydfil in the 39–18 victory over England at Eugene Cross Park, Ebbw Vale on Saturday 9 April 1910, and represented Welsh League XIII while at Merthyr Tydfil in the 14–13 victory over Australia at Penydarren Park, Merthyr Tydfil on Tuesday 19 January 1909.
