= Rhys Rees =

Wales international rugby league footballer

Personal information
- Full name: Rhys Rees
- Born: Wales
- Died: unknown

Playing information
- Position: Stand-off, Scrum-half
Club
Years	Team	Pld	T	G	FG	P
≤1908–≥10	Merthyr Tydfil
1910	Wigan	5	1	0	0	3
	Total	5	1	0	0	3
Representative
Years	Team	Pld	T	G	FG	P
1909	Welsh League XIII	1
1908–10	Wales	2

Rhys Rees (birth unknown – death unknown) was a Welsh professional rugby league footballer who played in the 1900s and 1910s. He played at representative level for Wales and Welsh League XIII, and at club level for Merthyr Tydfil and Wigan, as a stand-off or scrum-half.

== International honours ==
Rees won caps for Wales while at Merthyr Tydfil in 1908 against England and in 1910 against England, and represented Welsh League XIII while at Merthyr Tydfil in the 14-13 victory over Australia at Penydarren Park, Merthyr Tydfil on Tuesday 19 January 1909.
