= David Davies (rugby league) =

Wales international rugby league footballer

Personal information
- Full name: David B. Davies
- Born: Wales
- Died: unknown

Playing information
- Position: Forward
Club
Years	Team	Pld	T	G	FG	P
1907–10	Merthyr Tydfil
1910–12	Swinton	37	8	0	0	24
1912–21	Oldham	103	12	0	0	36
	Total	140	20	0	0	60
Representative
Years	Team	Pld	T	G	FG	P
1909	Welsh League XIII	1	1	0	0	3
1908–13	Wales	9	2	0	0	6

David B. Davies (birth unknown – death unknown) was a Welsh professional rugby league footballer who played in the 1900s and 1910s. He played at representative level for Wales and Welsh League XIII, and at club level for Merthyr Tydfil, Swinton and Oldham, as a forward.

== International honours ==
David Davies won 8 caps for Wales in 1908–1913 while at Merthyr Tydfil, Swinton, and Oldham, and represented Welsh League XIII while at Merthyr Tydfil in the 14–13 victory over Australia at Penydarren Park, Merthyr Tydfil on Tuesday 19 January 1909.

== Notes ==
David Davies played at Swinton in the same era as, but was not related to, the brothers David "Dai" Davies and Daniel "Dan" Davies.
