= Mid Rhondda Athletic Ground =

Multi-purpose arena in Tonypandy, Wales

- Location within Wales
- Location: Tonypandy, Wales
- Coordinates: 51.61894626936886°N 3.4556297580649784°W
- Surface: Grass

Construction
- Opened: 1903
- Demolished: 1933

Tenant
- Mid Rhondda

The Mid Rhondda Athletic Ground was a multi-purpose arena in Tonypandy, Wales, most notable for hosting the Mid Rhondda football and rugby league clubs.

== History ==
The Mid Rhondda Ground was built in 1902, originally as a cinder running track surrounding by a horse track, and hosted its first athletics meeting on Easter Monday in 1903. An asphalt cycling track was added in 1907.

On 20 April 1908, the world's first rugby league international between the England and Wales national sides took place on the Mid Rhondda Ground. 12,000 paying spectators turned out to watch an exciting game which Wales won 35–18. The gate receipts were enough to impress the committee to compete in the Northern Union and in 1908, Mid-Rhondda RLFC was formed to play at the Athletic Ground, although the club proved not to be profitable, with crowds in the low thousands. After 8,000 fans turned up to watch the South Wales FA Senior Cup final between Merthyr Town and Ton Pentre in April 1909, the club committee and decided to switch to association football.

The football club occupied the ground until its dissolution in 1928. The ground infrastructure survived until 1933, when the local council turned the area into a recreation park, and remains as a playing field in 2025, generally called "the Mid".
