= Thomas Paddison =

Wales international rugby league footballer

Personal information
- Full name: Thomas John Paddison
- Born: 1883; Neath district, Wales
- Died: unknown

Playing information
- Position: Fullback
Club
Years	Team	Pld	T	G	FG	P
≤1908–≥09	Merthyr Tydfil
Representative
Years	Team	Pld	T	G	FG	P
1909	Welsh League XIII	1
1908	Wales	1	0	0	0	0

Thomas John Paddison (1883 – death unknown) was a Welsh professional rugby league footballer who played in the 1900s. He played at representative level for Wales and Welsh League XIII, and at club level for Merthyr Tydfil, as a fullback.

== Background ==
Thomas Paddison's birth was registered in Neath district, Wales.

== International honours ==
Thomas Paddison won a cap for Wales while at Merthyr Tydfil in 1908 and represented Welsh League XIII while at Merthyr Tydfil in the 14-13 victory over Australia at Penydarren Park, Merthyr Tydfil on Tuesday 19 January 1909.
