= Shellard =

Shellard is a surname. Notable people with the surname include:

- Dominic Shellard (born 1966), British academic and politician
- Edwin Hugh Shellard (1815/16–1885), British architect
- Rhys Shellard (born 1985), British rugby union player
