= Paddison =

Paddison is a surname.

== List of people ==
- Gareth Paddison (born 1980), New Zealand professional golfer
- Garry Paddison, New Zealand footballer
- Geoffrey Paddison (1925–1972), English singer
- George L. Paddison (1883–1954), American academic
- Thomas Paddison (1883–unknown), Welsh professional rugby league footballer

== See also ==
- Maddison
- Addison (name)
