= David Thomas (rugby league) =

Wales international rugby league footballer

Personal information
- Born: Wales
- Died: unknown

Playing information

Rugby union
Club
Years	Team	Pld	T	G	FG	P
	Aberdare RFC

Rugby league
- Position: Wing
Club
Years	Team	Pld	T	G	FG	P
1905–07	Dewsbury
1907–09	Halifax	64	56	3	0	174
1909–≥09	Mid-Rhondda
	Total	64	56	3	0	174
Representative
Years	Team	Pld	T	G	FG	P
1908	Wales	3	3	0		9

David "Dai" Thomas (birth unknown – death unknown) was a Welsh professional rugby league footballer who played in the 1900s. He played at representative level for Wales, and at club level for Aberdare RFC, Dewsbury, Halifax and Mid-Rhondda, as a wing.

== Playing career ==
=== Club career ===
Thomas played for Dewsbury and Halifax at club level, having switched codes from rugby union club Aberdare RFC in 1905. He holds Dewsbury's "Tries In A Season" record with 40-tries scored in the 1906–07 season, and Dewsbury's "Tries In A Match" record with 8-tries against Liverpool City on 13 April 1907.

=== International honours ===
Thomas won caps for Wales while at Halifax in 1908 against England (3 matches).
