= Will Hopkins =

Wales international rugby league footballer

Personal information
- Full name: William Hopkins
- Born: 1880 Wales
- Died: 10/02/1941 unknown

Playing information
- Position: Scrum-half
Club
Years	Team	Pld	T	G	FG	P
1904–05	Wigan	15	0	2		4
	Huddersfield
1908–09	Aberdare
	Total	15	0	2	0	4
Representative
Years	Team	Pld	T	G	FG	P
1905	Other Nationalities	1	0	0	0	0
1908	Wales	1	0	0	0	0

Will Hopkins (birth unknown – death unknown) was a Welsh professional rugby league footballer who played in the 1900s. He played at representative level for Wales, and at club level for Aberdare, as a scrum-half.

== Club career ==
Hopkins played rugby league for Wigan and Huddersfield before debuting for Aberdare in 1908.

== International honours ==
Hopkins won a cap for Wales while at Aberdare in the 7–31 defeat by England at Wheater's Field, Salford on Monday 28 December 1908.
