= Tom Thomas (rugby league) =

Welsh rugby league footballer

Personal information
- Full name: Tom Thomas
- Born: unknown Aberavon, Wales
- Died: unknown

Playing information
- Position: Centre
Club
Years	Team	Pld	T	G	FG	P
1906–08	Wigan	35	14	11		64
1908–≤11	Merthyr Tydfil
	Total	35	14	11	0	64

Tom "Tommy" Thomas (birth unknown) was a Welsh professional rugby league footballer who played in the 1900s. He played at club level for Wigan and Merthyr Tydfil, as a centre.

== Background ==
Tom Thomas was born in Aberavon, Wales.

== Club career ==
Tom Thomas made his début for Wigan in the 26–11 victory over the Rochdale Hornets at Central Park, Wigan on Tuesday 25 December 1906, he scored his first try for Wigan (two tries) in the 37–3 victory over Liverpool City at Central Park, Wigan on Wednesday 2 January 1907, he scored his last try for Wigan in the 6–13 defeat by Barrow at Cavendish Park, Barrow-in-Furness on Saturday 1 February 1908, and he played his last match for Wigan in the 11–5 victory over Warrington at Central Park, Wigan on Saturday 15 February 1908. Tom Thomas transferred from Wigan to Merthyr Tydfil during the 1908–09 season for £60 (based on increases in average earnings, this would be approximately £21,100 in 2013), an amount that the Merthyr Tydfil's treasurer claimed he paid himself.

== Notable tour matches ==
Tom Thomas played at centre in Wigan's 12–8 victory over New Zealand at Central Park, Wigan on Saturday 9 November 1907.
