= Guy Morgan (rugby union) =

Wales international rugby union player and cricketer

- Born: William Guy Morgan; 26 December 1907 Garnant, Wales
- Died: 29 July 1973 (aged 65) Carmarthen, Wales
- Height: 5 ft 6 in (168 cm)
- School: Christ College, Brecon
- University: Cambridge University
- Notable relative(s): Teddy Morgan, uncle William Llewellyn Morgan, uncle

Rugby union career
- Position: Centre
Amateur team(s)
Years	Team	Apps	(Points)
1926-29	Cambridge University R.U.F.C.		
–	Guy's Hospital		
–	Swansea RFC		
–	London Welsh RFC		
–	Barbarian FC		
International career
Years	Team	Apps	(Points)
- Welsh Sec. Schools
1927–1930	Wales	8	(13)

Guy Morgan (26 December 1907 – 29 July 1973) was a Welsh rugby union player who captained Wales in 1929. He also played cricket for Glamorgan County Cricket Club.

== Rugby career ==
Morgan was born in Garnant and gained his first international cap playing for Wales Secondary Schools, in a team that contained future Wales full internationals Harry Bowcott and J.D. Bartlett, He was educated at Christ College, Brecon, and St Catharine's College, Cambridge (where Bowcott also studied). While at Cambridge he played for the University rugby team in the Varsity matches, winning four blues between 1926 and 1929. He gained his first cap while still at Cambridge, in a game against France at St Helens. It was an incredible debut for Morgan, scoring a try and being prominent in the scoring of four others. By the time he played his third international game in 1929 he was playing for Swansea, and on 2 February that year, at the age of 22, he was captain of his country. He would play just another four games, three more as captain.

=== International games played ===
Wales

- England 1929
- France 1927, 1929, 1930
- Ireland 1927, 1929, 1930
- Scotland 1929

== Biography ==
- Smith, David; Williams, Gareth (1980). Fields of Praise: The Official History of The Welsh Rugby Union. Cardiff: University of Wales Press. ISBN 0-7083-0766-3.
