= William Llewellyn Morgan =

GB Lions & Wales international rugby union player

William Llewellyn
- Born: William Llewellyn Morgan; 9 January 1884 Aberdare, Wales
- Died: 11 April 1960 (aged 76) Sketty, Wales
- School: Christ College, Brecon
- Notable relative(s): Teddy Morgan (brother); Guy Morgan (nephew)

Rugby union career
- Position: halfback
Amateur team(s)
Years	Team	Apps	(Points)
- Guy's Hospital
- Aberdare RFC
1905	Barbarian F.C.		
1905-1912	Cardiff RFC		
–	Stade Bordelais		
–	London Welsh RFC		
–	Glamorgan		
–	Kent		
International career
Years	Team	Apps	(Points)
1908	British Isles	2	(0)
1910	Wales	1	(0)

William Llewellyn Morgan (1 January 1884 – 11 April 1960) was a Welsh international rugby union halfback who played club rugby for Cardiff. Morgan played international rugby for Wales and in 1908 was selected to join Arthur Harding's Anglo-Welsh tour of New Zealand and Australia.

== Rugby career ==
One of the first clubs that Morgan was affiliated to was Guy's Hospital, following his older brother Teddy Morgan, who was already a Welsh international rugby player. During the 1905/06 season while representing Guy's, Morgan was invited to play for invitational touring team the Barbarians.

By 1908, Morgan was back in Wales, and playing for first class Welsh team, Cardiff. It was while representing Cardiff, that Morgan was selected for the Anglo-Welsh team to tour Australia and New Zealand with his brother Teddy. The British team were outclassed in the first Test Match against New Zealand in Dunedin, and five replacements were made for the second test in Wellington, which included both Morgan and his brother. Morgan found himself one of three halfbacks, in an unorthodox formation which mimicked the New Zealand seven-man pack. Joining Morgan at half back were two other Welsh players, James "Tuan" Jones and, moved from threequarters, Reggie Gibbs. The game ended in a 3-3 draw and Morgan was reselected for the final test in Auckland.

Despite his considerable rugby experience, it took until 1910 for Morgan to win a cap for his own birth country, Wales. In a home game played at the Cardiff Arms Park, Morgan was brought into the Welsh team to face Scotland as part of the Five Nations Championship as a replacement for Dicky Owen. Morgan was partnered at halfback with Percy Bush, which saw the Welsh team win by a comfortable 14 points to nil. The next game, Morgan was replaced by Newport's Tommy Vile and didn't represent Wales again.

After his rugby career for Cardiff came to an end, Morgan would often turn out for French team Stade Bordelais, where he was nicknamed "Billy Bordeaux".

=== International games played ===
Wales

- Scotland 1910

== Bibliography ==
- Griffiths, John (1987). The Phoenix Book of International Rugby Records. London: Phoenix House. ISBN 0-460-07003-7.
- Smith, David; Williams, Gareth (1980). Fields of Praise: The Official History of The Welsh Rugby Union. Cardiff: University of Wales Press. ISBN 0-7083-0766-3.
