= Mid Rhondda F.C. =

Former association football club in Wales

Coordinates: 51.6189°N 3.4555°W

Mid Rhondda
- Nicknames: The Mush; Mushrooms
- Founded: 1912
- Dissolved: 1928
- Ground: Mid Rhondda Athletic Ground; Tonypandy
- Capacity: 10,000 (0 seated)
- League: Southern League; Welsh League
Home colours

Mid Rhondda Football Club was an association football team, based in Tonypandy, Wales that was formed in 1912. Mid Rhondda were one of the earlier South Wales teams to form, as competition from rugby union within the Rhondda Valleys was very strong. The team played in both the Southern and Welsh Leagues, and should have been promoted to the first division of the Southern League after topping the second Division during the 1919–20 season. This though was denied them by a restructuring of the league, which in turn saw the club flounder and collapse by 1928.

== Club history ==
=== The adoption of football in Tonypandy ===
The Mid Rhondda Ground was built in the early part of the 1910s, as an attempt to form the 'best athletics ground in Wales'. It was built by the Mid Rhondda Athletic Company, and officially opened on 13 April 1913. The company raised £3,000 to complete the venture, and when complete it housed an outer cycle track with an inner field for the promotion of football, cricket and foot running. Although housing large events, such as an annual horse show, there appeared to be little sign of the Athletic Company recouping their outlay, until the committee of the Mid Rhondda Social and Athletic Club decided to embrace professional rugby league in 1908.

On 20 April 1908, the world's first rugby league international between the England and Wales national sides took place on the Mid Rhondda Ground. 15,000 paying spectators turned out to watch an exciting game which Wales won 35–18. The gate receipts were enough to impress the committee to compete in the Northern Union and in 1908, Mid-Rhondda RLFC were formed, playing not only in the Northern League but also in the Welsh League and Challenge Cup. Although the team performed well on the pitch, and hosted international competition from the touring Australia side, the venture was unprofitable. The rugby league crowds averaged between 3,000 and 4,000, but when the Mid Rhondda Ground hosted the 1909 final of the South Wales and Monmouthshire Football cup, a crowd of 8,000 was recorded. Association football was traditionally more popular in north Wales, but the cup final between local Rhondda team Ton Pentre F.C. and the newly formed Merthyr Town F.C. showed the Mid Rhondda Club that "soccer was the coming game". Mid-Rhondda RLFC folded at the end on the 1908–09 season, and plans were put into action to form an association team.

=== The Formation of Mid Rhondda F.C. ===
Early attempts to form a football club were placed on hold when industrial unrest spread through the Rhondda during 1910 and 1911. The coal mining area of the valleys experienced several strikes centred on the Glamorgan Colliery in Llwynypia, neighbouring Tonypandy. The events came to a climax in 1911 with the Tonypandy riots, where the town centre was vandalised and looted.

In 1912, with the events of the previous years settled, an attempt was made to introduce a football team in Tonypandy. The Mid Rhondda Football Club was set up, and a board of directors founded. All of the board members were from the Tonypandy area and were a cross section of tradesmen and workers representatives. Amongst the shareholders was D.A. Thomas, the owner of the Cambrian Combine of collieries, which had been at the heart of the strike just a year prior.

The club applied to join the Southern League and was accepted even though the club had yet to select a team. With a fortnight to go before the start of the 1912–13 season the club was facing closure due to lack of funds, but good press encouraged the promoters to carry on and a week later the team had a manager and enough players for a starting XI. The club's swift growth earned them the nickname The Mushrooms, though normally called The Mush. Their first season in the Second Division of the Southern League saw them face the first teams of Cardiff City, Swansea Town, Croydon Common and Luton Town. Mid Rhondda made a steady if unspectacular start to their professional career, finishing 8th out of 13 teams in their first season.

The promoters were happy with the club's progress in their first season, and over the next few seasons the team were often supported by crowds of over 10,000. Despite some good figures these crowds were inconsistent. The home clash with Newport County in 1913 for example witnessed just 3,000 spectators, leading to financial concerns. The team finished a respectful 7th in the 1913/14 season, in an expanded league of 16 clubs. The 1914/15 season saw a drop in fortunes with the team winning just 3 of their 12 games and ending 12th from 13. The club suspended play during the First World War, and the club lay dormant until the first season after the war.

=== 1919–20 season ===
Of all the seasons of the club's existence, 1919–20 was the most notable. With more funds available the committee of the Mid Rhondda Club made a decision to push the first team for promotion to the First Division, emulating Cardiff City. They turned to a local ex-international footballer Haydn Price to manage the team. He joined Mid Rhondda as secretary manager and immediately signed as captain former Aston Villa player, Joe Bache. Bache brought experience to the team, but it was the signing of an untested young player from Durham, Jimmy Seed, that would be Haydn's most important signing. Seed had started his career as a seventeen-year-old with Sunderland, and showed great potential in the reserves. During the war, Seed was posted to the front and was gassed in the trenches. On his return to training with Sunderland, he was told that because of lung problems his career was finished. Price disagreed and signed Seed.

...as soon as I got off the train, I was cheered like as if I was a heavyweight champion of the world, rather than a reject who had been told his footballing days were over.

— Jimmy Seed describing his reception at Tonypandy after joining Mid Rhondda

Seed played "non-stop football" from the time he joined Mid Rhondda, and his lungs appeared to recover. By the end of his first season Seed was signed by Tottenham Hotspur for £1,000, and enjoyed a long career with both Spurs and Sheffield Wednesday as well as making five appearances for England. Another notable player on Mid Rhondda's books at this time was future Wales international, Dai Collier.

A highlight of the season was when Mid Rhondda played local rivals Ton Pentre in a preliminary round of the FA cup. 20,000 spectators watched the game, filling the ground with many more covering the mountainside overlooking the pitch. More success was to come when the team won the Southern League Division Two, amassing 37 points over 20 games, losing none and drawing only three games. They then took the Welsh League title, beating Cardiff City into second place, losing just five of the thirty games. They completed the season with a third trophy, beating Barry F.C. 1–0 at Merthyr to take the South Wales Cup.

The strength of the club at the time is best gauged by the challenge matches the team undertook against Football League clubs. Due to the large following the club possessed, they were able to offer incentives to league clubs to travel to Tonypandy. These were teams that normally played Bristol on the Saturday, then brought their first teams to the Rhondda for a Monday night encounter. Crowds in excess of 15,000 and the substantial win bonus that was offered elevated these games above friendlies. These encounters included wins over Nottingham Forest (3–1), Derby County (2–0) and Portsmouth (1–0) in 1919 and a draw against Tottenham Hotspur and a narrow loss to Aston Villa (1–2) in 1920.

=== Club demise ===
The club and supporters expected continued success for the 1920–21 season in the First Division of the Southern League. A new stand was built, and other ground improvements were added, including a press box and a gymnasium. Then ready for the new season, the Southern League was invited to form a Third Division of the Football League. The current First Division of the Southern League became the new Third Division, and no promotions were accepted. Mid Rhondda remained in the Second Division.

From this, the team disintegrated. Price left for Grimsby Town and took five players with him, while the remaining players of the previous season found different clubs. This was followed by a national coal strike in 1921 which crippled the South Wales valleys, and the club was suspended by the Football Association of Wales for non-payment of debts. The club reformed in 1922, mainly thanks to voluntary donations from local miners, but now known as Mid Rhondda United. The club rejoined the Southern League for the 1924–25 season and applied for Football League membership in 1925. However the economic depression of the 1920s worsened, and there was real poverty in the Rhondda and there was little money for entertainment. The club continued until March 1928 when, with debts of £1,400, Mid Rhondda was forced to close when the banks called in its overdraft.

== Colours ==
The club originally wore black jerseys. By 1914, the club had changed to royal blue and white; originally in halves, but after the First World War in stripes, with white shorts, and black socks.

== Honours ==
- Welsh Football League champions: 1919–20
- South Wales FA Senior Cup – Winners: 1919–20

== Notable players ==
See also Category:Mid Rhondda F.C. players

== Bibliography ==
- Twydell, Dave (2001). Gone But Not Forgotten, Part 19. Yore Publications. ISBN 1-874427-194.
- Young, Paul (2003). The Mid and the Mush.
