= David Galloway (rugby league) =

Wales international rugby league footballer

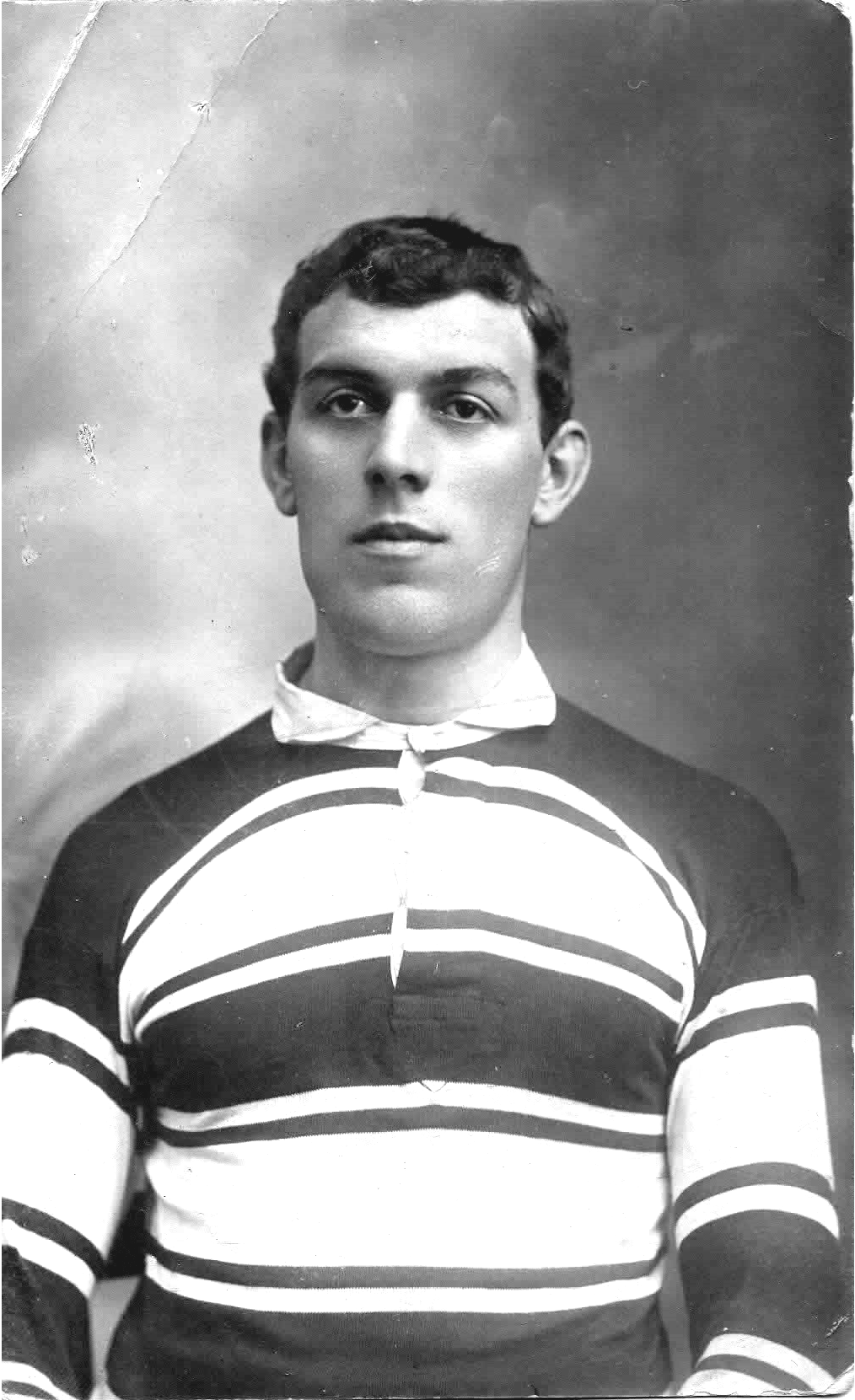

Personal information
- Full name: David Galloway
- Born: 1884 Pontypridd, Wales
- Died: 22 February 1913 (aged 28) Treherbert, Wales

Playing information
- Position: Forward
Club
Years	Team	Pld	T	G	FG	P
1909–10	Treherbert RLFC
1910–11	Hull F.C.
	Total	0	0	0	0	0
Representative
Years	Team	Pld	T	G	FG	P
1909–10	Wales	2	0	0	0	0

David Galloway (1884 – 22 February 1913) was a Welsh professional rugby league footballer who played in the 1900s and 1910s. He played at representative level for Wales, and at club level for Treherbert RLFC and Hull FC, as a forward. Treherbert RLFC completed only 12-matches during the 1909–10 season, and as defaulters, they were prevented from playing in the 1910–11 season, by which time both Alfred Francis, and David Galloway had joined Hull FC.

== Background ==
David Galloway was born in 1884 in Pontypridd. He died from tuberculosis on 22 February 2013, aged 28.

== International honours ==
David Galloway won 2 caps for Wales in 1909–1910 while at Treherbert RLFC.
