= Keith Rowlands =

British Lions & Wales international rugby union footballer

- Born: Keith Alun Rowlands; 7 February 1936 Brithdir, Bridgend, Wales
- Died: 18 November 2006 (aged 70) Cardiff, Wales
- School: Cowbridge Grammar School; Aberdare Boys' Grammar School
- University: University of London

Rugby union career
- Position: Lock
Amateur team(s)
Years	Team	Apps	(Points)
- Aberdare RFC
–	London Welsh RFC		
–	Llanelli RFC		
–	Cardiff RFC		
International career
Years	Team	Apps	(Points)
1962–1965	Wales	5	(0)
1962	British Lions	3	(3)

Keith Alun Rowlands (7 February 1936 – 18 November 2006), was a Welsh international lock rugby union player and later administrator, who was the first chief executive officer of the International Rugby Board.

== Playing career ==
Rowlands was born in Brithdir, Bridgend, the son of a Glamorgan Constabulary Police Inspector. After attending Cowbridge Grammar School, on his father's transfer to Aberdare, Rowlands entered the second year at Aberdare Boys' Grammar School and went on to captain both the rugby (1953–54) and cricket teams (1954 and 1955). He won a Welsh Secondary School Cap in 1955, playing against England at Cardiff. He graduated from University of London and served National Service with the 1st Battalion of The Welch Regiment from 1958 to 1960.

Rowlands played for Aberaman and then London Welsh. He transferred to Llanelli for one season in 1958, before Cardiff signed him in September 1961. He played 147 games for the Welsh capital side until 1967.

In March 1962 he gained his first of five caps for Wales when he played in the winning side which beat France. He made his debut for the Barbarians at Leicester in March 1962, later captaining the side in 1966. Rowlands represented the British and Irish Lions on 19 occasions, including all three tests in the 1962 Tour of South Africa, where he scored a try in the final international. He also played in the non-cap Lions match with Kenya.

He played his last rugby for Newport RFC in 1973/74.

== Post playing ==
Rowlands finished playing in 1967, and immediately became a committee member at Cardiff RFC. He was chairman for the 1974 season and continued to serve Cardiff until 1986.

Whilst serving on the Cardiff committee, he became a member of the Welsh Rugby Union. Rowlands was appointed as one of the WRU's two representatives on the International Rugby Board in 1983 and became the IRB's first general secretary in 1988. Under Rowlands guidance, its headquarters moved from Bristol to Dublin, Ireland. This was key in turning the Rugby World Cup into one of the leading sporting events in the world, which Rowlands was at the heart of as one of its directors.

Rowlands decided to retire at the end of the 1995 Rugby World Cup. However, IRB chairman Vernon Pugh and the RWC chairman Leo Williams persuaded Rowlands to take on the Chief Executive's role at the 1999 Rugby World Cup in Wales. He resigned all positions with the IRB and the RWC after the tournament ended.

In 2004 Rowlands beat WRU Secretary David East in the contest to succeed Sir Tasker Watkins as Welsh Rugby Union president.

== Outside rugby ==
Rowlands was married to Jean, with whom he had one child. In his retired years, he lived with his wife in Rhiwbina, Cardiff.

As he played his rugby in amateur days, Rowlands worked in sales and marketing for Arthur Guinness Ltd and the Taunton Cider before becoming a full-time professional at the IRB.

In his retirement Rowlands had roles as Patron of Aberaman RFC, President of Rhiwbina RFC, the Welsh Academicals and the Welsh Deaf Rugby Association. He was also President of the Cwmbach Male Voice Choir.

Rowlands collapsed at his home in Cardiff and died at lunchtime on 18 November 2006, less than 24 hours after watching Wales beat Canada 61–26 at the Millennium Stadium.
