= Alfred Francis =

GB & Wales international rugby league footballer

Alf Francis
- Godfrey Phillips cigarette card featuring Alfred Francis

Personal information
- Full name: Alfred John Francis
- Born: 30 June 1888 Treherbert, Glamorgan, Wales
- Died: 10 March 1968 (aged 79) Hull, Yorkshire, England

Playing information
- Position: Wing
Club
| Years | Team | Pld | T | G | FG | P |
|---|---|---|---|---|---|---|
| ≤1909–10 | Treherbert RLFC |
| 1910–19 | Hull FC | 245 | 166 | 2 |
| | Total | 245 | 166 | 2 | 0 | 0 |
Representative
| Years | Team | Pld | T | G | FG | P |
| 1913–14 | Wales | 2 | 1 |
| 1914 | Great Britain | 3 | 7 |

Alfred John "Alf" Francis (c. 1889 – 10 March 1968) was a Welsh professional rugby league footballer who played in the 1900s and 1910s. He played at representative level for Great Britain (non-Test matches) and Wales, and at club level for Treherbert RLFC and Hull F.C., as a wing.

== Playing career ==
=== International honours ===
Francis won 2 caps for Wales in 1913–1914 while at Hull, and toured with Great Britain on the 1914 Great Britain Lions tour of Australia and New Zealand.

=== Challenge Cup Final appearances ===
Francis played on the wing and scored a try in Hull's 6–0 victory over Wakefield Trinity in the 1913–14 Challenge Cup Final during the 1913–14 season at Thrum Hall, Halifax, in front of a crowd of 19,000.

=== Club career ===
Hull Kingston Rovers first became aware of Francis when he scored a try in Treherbert RLFC's 10–22 defeat by Hull Kingston Rovers during the 1909–10 season, but he was thought by Hull Kingston Rovers to be too small, so they decided against signing him. An official of Hull Kingston Rovers then recommended him to the Hull F.C. chairman who travelled to Wales, decided that Francis' size wasn't an issue, and signed him for Hull F.C. for 75 gold sovereigns (based on increases in average earnings, this would be approximately £27,720 in 2016) Treherbert RLFC completed only 12-matches during the 1909–10 season, and as defaulters, they were prevented from playing in the 1910–11 season, by which time both Alfred Francis, and David Galloway had joined Hull FC.

== Personal life ==
Alf Francis' marriage to Emma Mabel Baxter took place at St. Matthew's Church, Boulevard, Hull, on 8 December 1915. They had children; Wellesley T. Francis (born 1916) and Megan Francis (born 1922).

Francis, who worked as a miner in Wales, remained in Hull and became a barman after his career ended. He died in 1968 in Hull.
