= David East (police officer) =

British police officer

David East QPM is a retired British police officer who served as Chief Constable of South Wales Police, and was also Secretary of the Welsh Rugby Union.

== Pre-South Wales ==
Born in Llanelli, Wales, East made his way through the police force, becoming Deputy Chief Constable of Devon and Cornwall Police, where in 1979 he co-founded the force rugby club.

== South Wales Police ==
East was appointed Chief Constable of South Wales Police in 1983. During the UK miners' strike (1984–1985), East was Chief Constable of South Wales Police. Much as though the area was a key coal production area, East's careful policing meant that the area suffered few of the industrial relations problems associated with others areas of the British Isles. One of the key decisions East made was to address the problem of transporting coal from Llanwern to Port Talbot as a transport issue, running daily convoys of 140 trucks escorted by police cars and motorcycle outriders; none were stopped, and because East refused to use riot gear clothed police, none were attacked.

East was also the Chief Constable in charge of investigation of the most serious incident during the Miners Strike. On 30 November 1984, a concrete block was dropped on the car of taxi driver and father of four David Wilkie, killing him instantly. Political leaders united in condemning the killing: Labour's Neil Kinnock called it an "atrocity" and Prime Minister Margaret Thatcher said it was "an utterly despicable deed". A court in Cardiff convicted 21-year-old miners Dean Hancock and Russell Shanklin of Wilkie's murder, later reduced on appeal to manslaughter. After a fierce campaign for their release led by the NUM's Arthur Scargill and Labour MP Tony Benn, the men were released on 30 November 1989, the fifth anniversary of David Wilkie's death.

== Welsh Rugby Union ==
East became Secretary to the Welsh Rugby Union in the early 1990s, but only survived in the post for six months, resigning after the boards decision to let an invitational Wales team tour South Africa.

East would later pit himself forward for a number of committee and managing roles within the WRU, latterly beaten to the role of President of the WRU by Keith Rowlands to succeed Sir Tasker Watkins in August 2004, after which he resigned from all positions he held with the WRU.

== Other activities ==
East and his wife Gloria live at Bingham, Nottingham along with his daughter and grandson. East is involved with both the Bridgend Male Voice Choir, and the Llantwit Major Rugby Club.
