= Lewis Llewellyn =

Wales international rugby league footballer

Personal information
- Full name: Lewis John Llewellyn
- Born: 6 November 1881 Newport, Wales
- Died: 1 February 1931 (aged 49) Newport, Wales

Playing information

Rugby union
- Position: Centre
Club
Years	Team	Pld	T	G	FG	P
1901/2	Newport RFC	1

Rugby league
- Position: Wing
Club
Years	Team	Pld	T	G	FG	P
≤1908–12	Ebbw Vale
1912	Wigan	1	0	0	0	0
	Total	1	0	0	0	0
Representative
Years	Team	Pld	T	G	FG	P
1910–12	Wales	4	4	0	0	12

Lewis "Llew"/"Lew" John Llewellyn (6 November 1881 – 1 February 1931) was a Welsh rugby union and professional rugby league footballer who played in the 1900s and 1910s. He played club level rugby union (RU) for Newport RFC, as a centre, and representative level rugby league (RL) for Wales, and at club level for Ebbw Vale. and Wigan, as a wing.

== Background ==
Lewis Llewellyn was born in Newport, Wales, and he died aged 50 in Newport, Wales.

== International honours ==
Lewis Llewellyn won 4 caps for Wales (RL) in 1910–1912 while at Ebbw Vale.
