= Frank Wrentmore =

Welsh rugby footballer

Personal information
- Full name: Frank Wrentmore
- Born: fourth ¼ 1884; Pontypridd, Wales

Playing information

Rugby union
Club
Years	Team	Pld	T	G	FG	P
≤1908–08	Penygraig RFC

Rugby league
Club
Years	Team	Pld	T	G	FG	P
1908–09	Mid-Rhondda

Frank Wrentmore (birth registered during fourth ¼ 1884 in Pontypridd) was a Welsh rugby union, and professional rugby league footballer who played in the 1900s. He played club level rugby union (RU) for Penygraig RFC, and club level rugby league (RL) for Mid-Rhondda, he served with the Somerset Light Infantry with the British Expeditionary Force in World War I.

== Notable tour matches ==
Frank Wrentmore scored a try in Mid-Rhondda's 6–20 defeat by Australia at Mid Rhondda Athletic Grounds, Tonypandy.

== Christmas truce ==
Frank Wrentmore participated in the Christmas truce, a series of widespread unofficial ceasefires that took place along the Western Front around Christmas 1914, during World War I.
