= Albert Irvine =

English footballer

Personal information
- Full name: Albert Walter Irvine
- Date of birth: 7 May 1898
- Place of birth: Newcastle upon Tyne, England
- Date of death: 1935 (aged 36–37)
- Position: Full-back

Senior career*
Years	Team	Apps	(Gls)
1918–1919	Walker Celtic		
1919–1920	Mid-Rhondda		
1920–1921	Grimsby Town	3	(0)
1921–192?	Boston Town		
- * Club domestic league appearances and goals

Albert Walter Irvine (7 May 1898 – 1975) was an English professional footballer who played as a full-back.
