= Oliver Burgham =

Former GB & Wales international rugby league footballer

Personal information
- Born: 21 May 1885 Cinderford, Gloucestershire, England
- Died: 6 May 1967 (aged 81) Penwortham, Lancashire, England

Playing information
- Height: 5 ft 11 in (1.80 m)
- Weight: 186 lb (84 kg)

Rugby union
Club
Years	Team	Pld	T	G	FG	P
	Gloucester RFC

Rugby league
- Position: Forward
Club
Years	Team	Pld	T	G	FG	P
≤1908–≥08	Ebbw Vale
1911–15	Halifax	113	31	0	0	93
	Total	113	31	0	0	93
Representative
Years	Team	Pld	T	G	FG	P
1908	Wales	2	1	0	0	3
1911	Great Britain	1	0	0	0	0

Oliver Burgham (21 May 1885 – 6 May 1967) was an English professional rugby union and professional rugby league footballer who played in the 1900s and 1910s. He played club level rugby union (RU) for Gloucester RFC, and representative level rugby league (RL) for Great Britain and Wales, and at club level for Ebbw Vale and Halifax, as a forward. He played at Halifax until the outbreak of the First World War.

== Biography ==
Burgham played rugby union, and had previously captained Gloucestershire at county level before turning professional and joining Northern Union club Ebbw Vale in 1908. Three years later, he signed with English club Halifax.

Burgham won caps for Wales while at Ebbw Vale in 1908 against New Zealand, and England, and won a cap for Great Britain while at Halifax in 1911 against Australia.
