= Chick Jenkins =

Welsh rugby player

- Cope's Cigarette card featuring Chick Jenkins

Personal information
- Full name: Thomas Henry Jenkins
- Born: c. 1880 Cwm, Blaenau Gwent, Wales
- Died: 1932 (aged 51–52)

Playing information
- Height: 5 ft 8 in (1.73 m)
- Weight: 11 st 6 lb (73 kg)

Rugby union
Club
Years	Team	Pld	T	G	FG	P
1900–02	Pontypool RFC

Rugby league
- Position: Fullback, Centre
Club
Years	Team	Pld	T	G	FG	P
1902–04	Hull FC
1907–12	Ebbw Vale
	Total	0	0	0	0	0
Representative
Years	Team	Pld	T	G	FG	P
1908–12	Wales	7	2	0	0	6
1910	Great Britain	0	0	0	0	0

Thomas Henry Jenkins (c. 1880 – 1932), also known by the nicknames of "Chic", and "Chick", was a Welsh rugby union, and professional rugby league footballer who played in the 1900s and 1910s. He played club level rugby union (RU) for Pontypool RFC, and representative level rugby league (RL) for Great Britain (non-Test) and Wales, and at club level for Hull F.C. and Ebbw Vale, as a fullback or centre.

== Background ==
Chick Jenkins was born in Cwm, Wales.

== International honours ==
Chick Jenkins won caps for Wales (RL) while at Ebbw Vale 1908–1912 7-caps, and was part of the 1910 Great Britain Lions tour of Australia and New Zealand.
