= Rhys Shellard =

Welsh rugby union player

- Born: Rhys Chest Shellard; 26 June 1985 (age 41) Aberdare, Rhondda Cynon Taf, Wales
- Height: 1.83 m (6 ft 0 in)
- Weight: 94 kg (14 st 11 lb)

Rugby union career
- Position: Back Row
Senior career
Years	Team	Apps	(Points)
	Cardiff	64	
International career
Years	Team	Apps	(Points)
- Wales 7s

Rhys Shellard (born 25 June 1985) is a rugby union player for Cardiff RFC and Cardiff Blues in the Celtic League. He previously played with Aberdare RFC and most notably, Pontypridd RFC. At The end of the 2007–08 season Shellard left the Blues. Shellard's position of choice is as a back-row forward.

Rhys Shellard returned to Pontypridd for the 2012-2013 campaign.

He was selected in the Wales Sevens squad for 2012-13
