= Aberdare RLFC =

Defunct Welsh rugby league club, based in Aberdare, Wales

Aberdare R.L.F.C.
Club information
- Full name: Aberdare Rugby League Football Club
- Founded: March 1908
- Exited: 1909; 117 years ago

Former details
- Ground: Ynys Field
- Competition: Welsh League; Northern Rugby League
- 1908–9 season: 31st

Aberdare Rugby League Football Club was a professional rugby league club based in Aberdare, Wales playing in the Welsh League and Northern Union. Playing from Ynys Field (later Aberdare Athletic Ground) in Aberdare, the club was one of the first professional Welsh teams, formed in 1908 but folded after just a single season.

== Club history ==
=== Formation ===
At the beginning of the 20th century, rugby union was the sport of choice for most villages and towns. The sport was strictly amateur and players were not expected to receive any monies for taking part in the sport. If players were to be discovered taking payments, they and their club could be permanently suspended. The problem facing Welsh rugby was the rise of the professional Northern Union (later rugby league) in the North of England, where several clubs had split away from the International Rugby Board and formed their own league where players were paid to play. Many rugby union clubs found their star players poached from them by the new Northern League.

To prevent losing their star players, many rugby union clubs secretly paid their players a small amount of money for each match played. The first challenge of the professional era to face the Welsh Rugby Union came in 1907 when E.M. Rees, the ex-Secretary of Aberdare RFC, made claims in the press that his club made player payments. Rees made three claims in total, firstly that all players at his former club were receiving hidden wages, secondly that Aberdare had received a payment of £15 from rivals Treorchy to throw a crucial League match, and finally that Merthyr Alexandria had demanded a payment of £7 5s to bring his team to play Aberdare. The most notable player caught up in these allegations was Dai "Tarw" Jones, an internationally capped player for Wales and hero of the 1905 encounter with New Zealand. Jones was originally a player for Treherbert, but had switched to Aberdare, and he and his fellow players were being paid 10s a match. When Aberdare came into financial problems, they cut the illegal payments to 5s, and Jones promptly switched back to Treherbert.

The WRU held an investigation into all the allegations, and the sub-committees final report, published in September 1907 found Aberdare and Treorchy guilt of professionalism and permanently suspended the entire Aberdare and Treorchy committees, and then permanent suspended eight players from the sport of rugby union, including Dai Jones. These events gave the impetus for clubs sympathetic to the Northern Union the chance to split from the WRU and become professional. It seemed likely that Aberdare and E.M. Rees would be the first to form a league team, but they failed to obtain financial backing or the use of a pitch, and instead Ebbw Vale and Merthyr Tydfil were the first to form teams in 1907.

The catalyst for the formation of a Northern Union team in Aberdare occurred on 1 January 1908, when the Northern Union hired Ynys Park in Aberdare to host the first true international rugby league match, contested between Wales and New Zealand. A crowd of 15000 attended with gate receipts of £560. The commercial potential was realised by a group of 'tradesman and sportsmen', who met in Aberdare in March 1908 and guaranteed a sum of £150 to form a Northern Union club. The prime mover in the formation of the club was Llewellyn Deere, a former Mountain Ash union player who turned professional with Huddersfield in 1900. In 1908 Deere became the Landlord of the Locomotive Inn in Aberdare, and it was he who set about forming the club. A limited company was formed with a share capital of £500 and Deere was made company secretary, while Ted Ruther became chairman. On 21 July 1908, Deere attended a Northern Rugby League Committee meeting, and Aberdare, along with Barry were admitted.

=== 1908/1909 season ===
Aberdare's first match was played on 5 September 1908, when Wigan travelled to Ynys Park. A crowd of 3000 paid to watch the game. Wigan was ruthless, and it was reported that Aberdare 'evidenced a decided weakness in their application of the rules', as they lost the game 56-0, Wigan running in 12 tries without reply. A visit to St. Helens two weeks later saw Aberdare score their first League points, but still lost 13-36. Worse was to come when they lost to fellow newly formed Welsh team Treherbert away from home, then in the return match the very next week they lost again in front of fewer than 300 spectators. The arrival of Wakefield Trinity drew a better crowd on 17 October, but the 26-0 loss brought Aberdare's losing streak to six games. This was followed by another loss to Merthyr Tydfil before the team recorded their first win in a Welsh League match against Treherbert.

The 9 November 1908 saw the arrival of the second international team at Ynys Park, the first touring Australian team. The tour match against Aberdare drew a crowd of 5000 on a Monday afternoon, and the tourists ran out 37-10 winners. The very next match gave Aberdare their first and only win in the Northern Rugby League a massive 43-5 win over fellow strugglers Barry, though Barry had revenge on 12 December when they knocked Aberdare out of the Challenge Cup in the first round.

Aberdare's season did not improve after the Barry victory in the League, and they went on to lose ten of their remaining 12 games. Of the games they won, both were in the Welsh League, and these were against Treherbert and Barry. After crowd numbers failed to improve, Aberdare even tried switching grounds, playing their home encounter with St Helens at Merthyr's College Field. Though there was very little interest in the game and numbers remained poor. Towards the end of the season, Aberdare were expected to travel to West Yorkshire to face Wakefield, but the Wakefield committee failed to meet Aberdare's request for an advance of £15 to cover travelling costs. Wakefield believing the gate receipts would be so low, they wouldn't cover the expenses, and the game never took place.

Aberdare finished they first and only season by placing 31st out of 31 clubs in the Rugby Football League, winning one game, drawing none and losing 16. In the Welsh League they fared slightly better coming in fifth out of six, with three wins and no draws from eight matches.

The only consolation form the season was when one of their players, Will Hopkins was chosen to play for the Wales national rugby league team. His one and only cap was awarded in the encounter with England on the 28 December 1908.

=== Club demise ===
At the end of the season Athletic News branded the four newly formed Welsh clubs, Aberdare, Mid-Rhondda, Barry and Treherbert as 'ignominious failures". Then, in the mid season break, the Northern Rugby League passed a by-law that stated if clubs were in arrears of any kind, the teams would be named defaulters and banned from further competitions. Barry and Aberdare were both cited of this charge. On 8 July 1909, Aberdare told the League that it expected to come out of arrears and would meet its obligations, but two days later the club reported it had 'unexpected difficulties' and resigned from the League. The club never played league rugby again.

== Players of note ==
Players Earning International Caps While at Aberdare...

- Will Hopkins won one cap for Wales while at Aberdare in 1908 against England
- Dick Thomas won one cap for Welsh League XIII while at Aberdare in 1909 against Australia

Other Players...

- David Thomas

A team photo appeared in the Evening Express Football Edition on 12 September 1908.

== Bibliography ==
- Gate, Robert (1986). Gone North: Volume 1. Ripponden: R.E. Gate. ISBN 0-9511190-0-1.
- Lush, Peter; Farrar, Dave (1998). Tries in the Valley: A History of Rugby League in Wales. London: London League Publications. ISBN 0-9526064-3-7.
- Smith, David; Williams, Gareth (1980). Fields of Praise: The Official History of The Welsh Rugby Union. Cardiff: University of Wales Press. ISBN 0-7083-0766-3.
