= Mid-Rhondda RLFC =

Defunct Welsh rugby league club, based in Tonypandy, Wales

Mid-Rhondda R.L.F.C.
Club information
- Full name: Mid-Rhondda Rugby League Football Club; Mid-Rhondda Social and Athletic Club
- Founded: June 1908; 118 years ago
- Exited: 1909; 117 years ago

Former details
- Ground: Athletic Ground
- Competition: Welsh League; Northern Rugby League

Mid-Rhondda Rugby League Football Club was a professional rugby league club based in Tonypandy, Wales playing in the Welsh League and Northern Union. Based at the Athletic Ground in Tonypandy, Mid-Rhondda were one of the first professional Welsh teams, formed in 1908 but folding after just a single season. Mid-Rhondda later became Mid Rhondda F.C., a notable association football team in the Rhondda Valleys.

== Club history ==
=== Formation ===
In 1907 the first two rugby league teams in Wales were formed, Ebbw Vale and Merthyr Tydfil. Although South Wales was best known for its rugby union teams, events in Aberdare and the Rhondda between 1905 and 1907 had revealed several clubs were breaking amateur rules and were paying their players. This led to club and player suspensions by the Welsh Rugby Union, and this in turn led to some clubs considering switching to the professional Northern Union and rugby league. On 1 January 1908, Aberdare hosted a Wales versus New Zealand encounter in the world's first full international rugby league game. Then, on 20 April, Tonypandy was chosen as the location for the very first rugby league encounter between Wales and England, with the match played at the local Athletic Ground. Wales won 35–18, and a crowd of 12000 was recorded.

The Mid-Rhondda club, also known as the Mid-Rhondda Social and Athletic Club, was formed just a few weeks after the Wales vs. England game and was admitted to the Northern Union on 30 June 1908. The club headquarters was at the Cross Keys Hotel in Tonypandy, and their home pitch was the Athletic Ground. With the formation that year of three other Welsh league teams, Barry, Aberdare and Treherbert, a Welsh League was formed allowing Mid-Rhondda to compete in two leagues.

=== 1908–09 ===
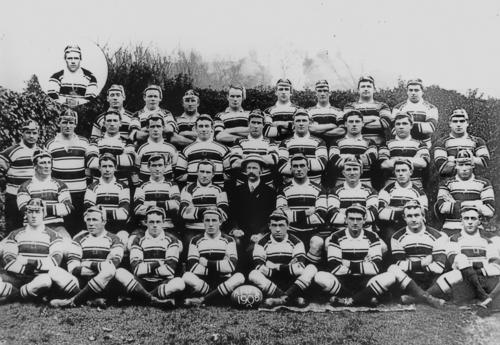
The touring 'Kangaroos', the 1908 Australia team that played Mid-Rhondda

Mid-Rhondda played their debut in the Northern Rugby League on 5 September 1908 in a home fixture with Bradford Northern. A crowd of 2000 watched the game, in which Mid-Rhondda took an early lead before eventually losing 15–5. This was followed by a string of defeats to Treherbert, Ebbw Vale and Merthyr, before the club faced international opposition, the first touring Australian team. Mid-Rhondda were the Australians' first opponents of the tour, and a crowd of 7500 was recorded for the match, one of the largest attendances of the tour. The Australians led 18–0 at half time, but tries from Frank Wrentmore and Dai Thomas, gave Mid-Rhondda some respectability, losing the match 20–6. Australia's Dally Messenger, one of rugby league's greatest players, scored two tries and four goals during the match.

The Australia game was followed by an away loss to Swinton, but the next game, a NU encounter with Merthyr, saw Mid-Rhondda achieve their very first victory, winning 7–3. The next six games were of mixed fortunes, with victories over Aberdare and Barry, but the club were still finding the Northern clubs difficult to beat, losing heavily to both Bradford Northern and Hull F.C. On 12 December, the club played in their first Challenge Cup match, and were drawn against fellow Rhondda team, Treherbert. In a close encounter, Mid-Rhondda won 8–7, opening up a tie in the next round to Barry. The second round cup game took place just two weeks later, with Mid-Rhondda winning 2–0 to take them into the quarter-finals.

The season continued in a familiar pattern for Mid-Rhondda with fair success over the Welsh teams, but being unable to beat the English teams. The club beat Barry in the Northern League and Welsh League, managed a double victory over Aberdare and Merthyr and a win and a loss to Treherbert. Amongst these games there were loses to Broughton Rangers (0–6), Swinton (7–16) and Hull (7–15). On 27 February, the club faced Hunslet in the quarter-finals of the Challenge Cup; however Hunslet proved too strong, with their star player Billy Batten scoring four tries in a 25–5 victory over the Welshmen.

Mid-Rhondda finished the season with a record of 18 games played in the Northern League, five won, one drawn and twelve loses, leaving them 24th out of 31 clubs.

=== Switch to association ===
At the end of the season the club officials stated that they had not been happy with the low attendances and financial rewards offered by the Northern Union game. In April 1909, the Athletic Ground played host to the final of the South Wales and Monmouthshire Association Football Cup, played between Merthyr Town and Ton Pentre. The game, won by Ton Pentre 2–0, was watched by a crowd of 8,000, an attendance figure Mid-Rhondda only matched when they faced the touring Australians. After the match, the Mid-Rhondda chairman stated that the financial position under the Northern Union had not realised expectations, and that as far as the club could see, soccer was the coming game.

In July 1909, it was reported that neither Treherbert or Mid-Rhondda, would be included in the Challenge Cup draw as both teams were in arrears to the Northern Union as of 30 June. In the same month Mid-Rhondda RLFC withdrew from the Northern Rugby League, and as was expected an Association side appeared at the Athletic Ground, called Mid-Rhondda AFC, from the 1909–10 season.

== Notable players ==
- Dai Thomas, Wales rugby league international, signed from Halifax in 1908
- Frank Wrentmore, ex-Penygraig RFC player who is also notable as being one of the British soldiers involved in the Christmas truce of 1914.

== Bibliography ==
- Gate, Robert (1986). Gone North: Volume 1. Ripponden: R.E. Gate. ISBN 0-9511190-0-1.
- Lush, Peter; Farrar, Dave (1998). Tries in the Valley: A History of Rugby League in Wales. London: London League Publications. ISBN 0-9526064-3-7.
- Smith, David; Williams, Gareth (1980). Fields of Praise: The Official History of The Welsh Rugby Union. Cardiff: University of Wales Press. ISBN 0-7083-0766-3.
- Young, Paul (2003). The Mid and the Mush
