= Barry RLFC =

Defunct Welsh rugby league club, based in Barry, Wales

Barry R.L.F.C.
Club information
- Full name: Barry Rugby League Football Club
- Founded: August 1908
- Exited: 1909; 117 years ago

Former details
- Ground: Trinity Street
- Competition: Welsh League; Northern Rugby League
- 1909: 29th (of 31)

Uniforms
Home colours

Barry Rugby League Football Club was a professional rugby league club based in Barry, Vale of Glamorgan, Wales playing in the Welsh League and Northern Union. Based at the Trinity Street Ground in Barry, the club was one of the first professional Welsh teams, formed in 1908 but folded after just a single season.

== Club history ==
=== Formation ===
At the beginning of the 20th century, rugby union was the sport of choice for most villages and towns. Association football was viewed as a north Wales activity, and cricket was the summer game. At the end of the 19th century, clubs in the north of England had broken away from the International Rugby Board, and started a professional version of rugby which later became known as rugby league. Rugby union was a strictly amateur sport, and any player or club that took any form of payment were likely to be suspended from the game. This was very difficult to administer, as clubs were beginning to experience their star players "Going North", to the professional game where they would be paid to play rugby. In 1907, two rugby league teams formed in South Wales and joined the Northern Union, they were Ebbw Vale and Merthyr Tydfil. This led to further clubs considering the switch to the Northern Union game, Barry being one of them.

In 1908, the Barry Herald reported that Barry was 'going strong for a NU club'. A meeting was held soon after at the Windsor Hotel in Barry, presided over by a Mr J. White, where the discussion was to form a Northern Union club. In August, the Herald predicted that 'Barry will loom large in the football world', and that 'crack NU Rugby teams from the North of England' were expected to visit. The club formed soon after and the local Trinity Street ground was acquired as the team pitch while the team colours would be the same as Cardiff Rugby Football Club, that is Cambridge Blue jerseys and socks and black shorts.

To run the professional club a company needed to be formed, so with capital of £250 in 10 s shares Barry Northern Union Rugby Football Club Ltd. was formed. These subscribers came from all parts of the town who needed to present a minimum of 50s cash subscription or £5 to qualify for the board of directors. For match days, Barry Railway Company offered 'special facilities' for those travelling from Cardiff and the Rhondda Valleys.

=== 1908-1909 season ===
Barry's first game under the Northern Union rules was against fellow newly formed Welsh team, Treherbert, on 5 September 1908. The game was played at home, and a 'large crowd' watched Barry win their first match 6-3. A week later the team travelled by train from Barry to West Yorkshire to face their first Northern team, Keighley. Barry were outclassed, and lost the match 31-0, though the eight-and-a-half-hour journey to reach the venue may have had an effect. The next match was played at home, and Barry faced another major team from England, this time Leeds. Barry lost the game 17-3 in front of just 2000 paying spectators; and this number generally declined as the season progressed. Barry lost their third game in a row when they faced Ebbw Vale, but then managed their second Northern Rugby League win when they defeated Aberdare 13-5. However, on 17 October, in an away fixture to Ebbw Vale, a depleted Barry lost 37-0 and then a 'very weak team' lost 6-31 to Widnes.

Despite 'probably the best gate of the season', Barry's home encounter with Oldham was a terrible result, losing by 54-0. Then in an away fixture to Merthyr, Barry could only field 11 players, with their club secretary having to fill in at full-back. Results continued to be poor, with defeats to Mid-Rhondda, Aberdare, Keighley and Treherbert. On 12 December the team was drawn to play Aberdare in the first round of the Challenge Cup, and managed to acquire a few new players, leading to a rare 9-5 home win. Barry then failed to show for a Welsh League encounter with Ebbw Vale, and their progress in the Challenge Cup was halted by a home defeat to Mid-Rhondda. This was the start of a seven-game losing streak. Their losing run was broken on 20 February 1909, when the team would first beat Northern opposition, Widnes. The match, played at Trinity Street, saw a large crowd assembled to see the club's newest recruit, Dickie David. David, an ex-Cardiff and Wigan player who had been capped for the Wales rugby union team, failed to show for the game, saying he could not appear due to business. Even without their new star player Barry were victorious winning 12-6 despite trailing 2-6 at half time. This would be Barry's final win, as their last four games ended in defeat, including heavy losses to Leeds (56-0) and Ebbw Vale (38-0).

Barry ended the season bottom of the Welsh League, and in the Northern Rugby League they finished 29th out of 31 clubs with 3 wins, no draws and 15 losses.

=== Club dissolution ===
In June 1909 Barry were named as defaulters by the Northern Rugby League. On 12 June 1909, the Athletic News reported that 'Barry had failed to fulfil the conditions laid down by the Committee' of the NRL and that they were 'practically expelled'. The club never played any further matches and the business was formally dissolved in 1913.

== Bibliography ==
- Gate, Robert (1986). Gone North: Volume 1. Ripponden: R.E. Gate. ISBN 0-9511190-0-1.
- Lush, Peter; Farrar, Dave (1998). Tries in the Valley: A History of Rugby League in Wales. London: London League Publications. ISBN 0-9526064-3-7.
- Smith, David; Williams, Gareth (1980). Fields of Praise: The Official History of The Welsh Rugby Union. Cardiff: University of Wales Press. ISBN 0-7083-0766-3.
