= Dai Collier =

Welsh footballer

Personal information
- Full name: David John Collier
- Date of birth: 12 April 1894
- Place of birth: Llwynypia, Wales
- Date of death: 30 November 1972 (aged 78)
- Height: 5 ft 7 in (1.70 m)
- Position: Inside right

Senior career*
Years	Team	Apps	(Gls)
- St Cynon Church
- Mid Rhondda
1920–1921	Grimsby Town	44	(13)
- Llanelly
- Mid Rhondda United
1924–1927	Barry	66	(17)

International career
1921	Wales	1	(1)
- * Club domestic league appearances and goals

David John Collier MM (12 April 1894 – 30 November 1972) was a Welsh semi-professional football inside right who played in the Football League for Grimsby Town. He finished his career with Barry, playing more than 65 times for the club. He scored on his only cap for Wales, in a 2–1 British Home Championship win over Scotland on 12 February 1921.

== Personal life ==
Collier served in the Welsh Regiment during the First World War and was awarded the Military Medal for an act of heroism at Mametz Wood during the Battle of the Somme in July 1916. He suffered shrapnel wounds to the leg during the engagement.

== See also ==
- List of Wales international footballers (alphabetical)
