= Ebbw Vale RLFC =

Defunct Welsh rugby league club

Ebbw Vale R.L.F.C.
Club information
- Full name: Ebbw Vale; Rugby League Football Club
- Founded: 15 July 1907; 119 years ago
- Exited: 1912; 114 years ago

Former details
- Ground: Bridge End Field
- Competition: Welsh League; Northern Rugby League
- 1912: 25th

Records
- Champions: 2 (Welsh League) (1908–1909, 1910–1911)

Ebbw Vale Rugby League Football Club was a professional rugby league club based in Ebbw Vale, Wales playing in the Welsh League and Northern Union. Based at Bridge End Field, Ebbw Vale were one of the first professional Welsh teams, and the last to disband in 1912 after the failure of the Welsh League. Ebbw Vale produced seven players who would go on to represent the Wales national rugby league team, and were seen as the only Welsh team of the time who could challenge the Northern League.

== Formation ==
The Ebbw Vale rugby league team was the first club in Wales to 'turn professional' being founded on 15 July 1907, the same month that Merthyr Tydfil RLFC formed. The team formed out of Ebbw Vale RFC, an amateur rugby union team, whose members were enraged at the "...bogus amateurism in the Monmouthshire League". Rugby union, led by the Welsh Rugby Union in Wales, had strict laws, barring all players to accept any wages or expenses to play the union code of rugby. This rule was often broken, to not only keep players at a club, but also to prevent them from "Going North", to join the professional Northern League in England. Ebbw Vale made a stand, and after a meeting at the Bridge End Hotel in the town, the club voted 63-20 in favour of adopting professionalism and joined the Northern Union.

The switch to professionalism had been orchestrated by their secretary, William Evans, who not only steered the club to adopting Northern Union rules, but had also won guarantees from the NU Committee that the club would be paid £10 for every match played in the north. Evans was made secretary of Ebbw Vale Rugby Football Club Company Ltd., and the company was formed with capital of £250. The Welsh Rugby Union reacted by suspending all players, officials and the club for life. The Northern Union tried to counter this, by stating that no South Wales players would be allowed to switch to northern professional clubs unless refused places by Ebbw Vale and Merthyr first.

== Honours ==
- Welsh League: 2
  - 1908-09, 1909–10

== Club career ==
=== 1907–1908 ===
Ebbw Vale's first fixture as a professional club was against Keighley at Lawkholme Lane, on 7 September 1907, losing 26-3. The team's first home game was a week later, on 14 September, a 29-0 loss to Salford. Ebbw Vale's first win, was against fellow Welsh converts Merthyr Tydfil, beating them at Merthyr on 12 October 1907, this was followed the very next game with their first success over a northern team, a 10-2 victory against Swinton. The Swinton match was played in front of 2000 home supporters, while matches against Halifax in January 1908, and Barrow in February, saw crowds of around 4000. Ebbw Vale finished their first season with 30 games played in the Northern League, six won, two drawn and 22 lost, finishing 26th out of 27 clubs.

The 1907–08 season was also notable for the first overseas touring international team to visit Britain; New Zealand's All Golds. The All Golds had already beaten Merthyr in November 1907, and New Year's Day 1908, the team played the Wales rugby league team in the first true international rugby league game between two nations. Played at the Athletic Ground in Aberdare the game was watched by a crowd of 12000. Ebbw Vale supplied two of their players to the Wales team, Chick Jenkins and Oliver Burgham, both men becoming the club's first international caps. On 1 February, Ebbw Vale faced the same touring New Zealand team at their own ground, losing narrowly.

On 20 April 1908, Burgham and Jenkins won their second caps with the club in the first Wales encounter with England; and were joined by teammate W.J. Saunders who won his first cap.

=== 1908–1909 ===
The next season saw four more Welsh teams join the Northern Union, and with these additional teams the country was able to form the Welsh League. The League consisted of a home and away game, and the team joining Ebbw Vale and Merthyr were Treherbert, Mid-Rhondda, Aberdare and Barry. In addition the Union promised each team four home and away games with teams from the north.

It was an excellent first season for Ebbw Vale in the Welsh League, only losing to Treherbert in the last match of the tournament, when the title was already theirs. Gate receipts rose that season, with the Northern League encounter with Merthyr reportedly watched by 8,000 people; though when Barry failed to show on the 1908 Christmas Day encounter, the club lost an estimated £80 to £90 in takings. Ebbw Vale finished the season, not only the very first Welsh League Champions, but also finished 14th out of 31 teams in the Northern Rugby League, with 12 wins, a draw and 11 losses. The only blemish to the season was being dumped out of the Challenge Cup by amateur team Beverley. This was Ebbw Vale's first entry into the Cup, and their first round exit was described by the Athletic News as a 'Welsh disaster'. Ebbw Vale would be the last professional team to be beaten by an amateur team in the Challenge Cup until Beverley repeated the feat against Highfield in the 1994–95 season.

At international level Ebbw Vale again supplied a player to the Wales national team, Jack Foley in an away match with England. Although they did not play an international against Wales, the Australia team that toured Britain during this season, did schedule games against both Merthyr and Ebbw Vale. Ebbw Vale played the Australians on 18 January 1909, losing the match 8-9.

=== 1909–1910 ===
The 1909–10 season saw Ebbw Vale share the Bridge End Field with Ebbw Vale AFC, the local football team. Ebbw Vale again won the Welsh League, but after Mid-Rhondda, Barry and Aberdare all wound themselves up, only three clubs survived to contest the tournament. The club performed slightly worse than the previous season in the Northern League finishing 17th out of 28 clubs, with nine wins, two draws and 13 losses.

The highlight of the season for Ebbw Vale this season was their run in the Challenge Cup. Their first team they drew in the Cup was Merthyr, and in front of a crowd of 4000, Ebbw Vale won their first Challenge Cup match winning 12-7. The next round, Ebbw Vale were given an away tie at Huddersfield, the first encounter between the clubs. Ebbw Vale's victory over Huddersfield was seen as a shock result, to which the Athletic News later reported, 'NU club football in South Wales has, with one exception, made little progress. That exception is Ebbw Vale,' In the quarter-finals of the Cup, Ebbw Vale were drawn at home to Salford, but gave up home advantage to play at Salford's ground. Ebbw Vale lost 8-2, ending their most successful cup run in the club's history.

Two international matches were played by Wales this season, both against England; and Ebbw Vale were represented in both, by Foley in the first and Lewis Llewellyn, Jenkins and Foley in the second. The second encounter with England was held at Bridge End Field, the first rugby league international to be played at the ground, and Jenkins was given the captaincy in a 39-18 victory for the Welsh. Another honour achieved by the club during the 1909/10 season was the inclusion of "Chick" Jenkins in the very first over-seas tour of the Great Britain team. Led by James Lomas, Jenkins was one of seven Welshmen selected for the tour, but he was the only player to be selected directly from one of the Welsh teams. Jenkins played in ten matches of the tour, scoring three tries and four goals, but was never selected for any of the Test matches.

=== 1910–1911 ===
With the withdrawal of Treherbert as a rugby league club, the Welsh League came to an end, with only Merthyr and Ebbw Vale remaining from the six Welsh clubs. They experienced a difficult start to the Northern Rugby League, with just one win from the first seven games, but a good run through October and November saw the team achieve wins over Runcorn, Hunslet, Coventry and Halifax. After a win over Merthyr on Boxing Day, the club then went into a slump, losing 13 games in a row, which was only halted on the last game of the season when they beat York. Ebbw Vale finished the season with nine wins from 30 matches, ending 25th out of 28 teams. Ebbw Vale again entered the Challenge Cup, this time going out in the first round to Batley.

Wales played two more international games this season, and Ebbw Vale fielded three players in both games, Jenkins, Llewellyn and Foley. The first game was played away at Coventry, while the home match was again played at Bridge End Field.

=== 1911–1912 ===
1911–12 was to be Ebbw Vale's last season, Merthyr Tydfil having folded at the end of the previous season, leaving Ebbw Vale as the lone representative rugby league team in Wales. The start of the Northern Rugby League campaign saw Ebbw Vale lose the first five matches, and their form did not improve much throughout the season; winning just four games, drawing three and losing 23. They ended the season 25th out of 27 clubs, and in April, towards the end of the campaign, they failed to field a complete team of 13 players in matches to Halifax and Hull Kingston Rovers. The team also failed to get past the first round of the Challenge Cup, this time losing 10–2 to Halifax.

A second touring Australian team came to Great Britain during the season, and although the team did not play against Ebbw Vale, they came to Bridge End Field to face Wales. Ebbw Vale supplied three players to the Wales team, Jenkins, H. Smith and G Hitchings; Jenkins was again given the honour of captaining the national team. The second Wales game of the season, held against England at Oldham, saw the last two players to represent Wales from Ebbw Vale, Jenkins and Llewellyn.

== Dissolution ==
In August 1912, a month before the new season was about to start, the club lost two key members; Llew Llewellyn switched to Wigan and W. Higgins moved to Hull. Rumours began to circulate that the club finances were in a poor state, and the Merthyr Express reported that the club may not start the coming season. Despite the rumours, Ebbw Vale were expected to begin their programme with an away match to Huddersfield on 7 September. However, two days before the game it was announced by the club that they would not be able to send a team and that Vale had resigned from the Northern Rugby League, and the club disbanded.

== Players of note ==
Players Earning International Caps While at Ebbw Vale…

- Oliver Burgham won caps for Wales while at Ebbw Vale in 1908 against New Zealand, and England, and won a cap for Great Britain while at Halifax in 1911 against Australia
- John "Jack" Foley won caps for Wales while at Ebbw Vale in 1909 against England
- William Higgins represented Wales League XIII while at Ebbw Vale in 1909 against Australia
- G. Hitchings (Second-row) won a single cap for Wales while at Ebbw Vale in 1911 against Australia
- W. E. 'Chick'/'Chic' Jenkins won caps for Wales while at Ebbw Vale in 1908…1912 7-caps
- Lewis Llewellyn won caps for Wales while at Ebbw Vale 1910…1912 4-caps.
- W. J. Saunders won a single cap for Wales while at Ebbw Vale in 1908 against England
- H. Smith (Centre) won a single cap for Wales while at Ebbw Vale in 1911 against Australia

=== Other players ===
- ?. Bingham
- ?. Bowen (hooker)
- Dai Davies (fullback)
- ?. Harvey (scrum-half)
- ?. Monks (loose forward)
- ?. Smith centre
- ?. Thomas (stand-off)
- ?. Thomas (prop)
- ?. Williams (second-row)

== Bibliography ==
- Gate, Robert (1986). Gone North: Volume 1. Ripponden: R.E. Gate. ISBN 0-9511190-0-1.
- Haynes, John (2007). All Blacks to All Golds. Brighouse: League Publications Ltd. ISBN 978-1-901347-17-3.
- Lush, Peter; Farrar, Dave (1998). Tries in the Valley: A History of Rugby League in Wales. London: London League Publications. ISBN 0-9526064-3-7.
- Smith, David; Williams, Gareth (1980). Fields of Praise: The Official History of The Welsh Rugby Union. Cardiff: University of Wales Press. ISBN 0-7083-0766-3.
