= Merthyr Tydfil RLFC =

Defunct Welsh rugby league club, based in Merthyr Tydfil

Merthyr Tydfil R.L.F.C.
Club information
- Full name: Merthyr Tydfil Rugby League Football Club
- Founded: 15 July 1907; 118 years ago
- Exited: 1911; 115 years ago

Former details
- Ground: College Field
- Competition: Welsh League; Northern Union
- 1910–11: 26th

Merthyr Tydfil Rugby League Football Club was a professional rugby league club based in Merthyr Tydfil, Wales playing in the Welsh League and Northern Union. Based at College Field, Merthyr Tydfil were one of the first professional Welsh teams, and folded in 1911 after the failure of the Welsh League. Merthyr Tydfil produced five players who would go on to represent the Wales national rugby league team, and in the 1908-09 season finished eighth in the Northern League, the best result achieved by any of the first six professional Welsh teams.

== Club history ==
=== Formation ===
At the beginning of the 20th century, rugby union was the sport of choice for most villages and towns in Wales. The sport was strictly amateur, and players were not expected to receive any monies for taking part in the sport. If players were discovered taking payments, they and their club could be permanently suspended. The problem facing Welsh rugby was the rise of the professional Northern Union (later rugby league) in the North of England, where several clubs had split away from the International Rugby Board and formed their own league where players were paid to play. Many rugby union clubs found their star players poached from them by the new Northern League.

At the start of the 20th century the most successful rugby team in Merthyr was Merthyr Alexandria. At the club's AGM in July 1907, E.M. Rees, the former secretary of Aberdare RFC, alleged that Merthyr was involved in professionalism. He stated that not only had the secretary of Merthyr Alexandria, W.T. Jones, demanded £7 5s. to bring his team to play Aberdare, but also Merthyr paid players per match. These allegations prompted an investigation by the Welsh Rugby Union, the governing body of rugby union in Wales. At the AGM a proposal was made for Merthyr Alexandria to adopt professionalism and join the Northern Union, but this was overwhelmingly rejected by the committee. Even though Merthyr Alexandria remained true to the amateur sport, within a week of the AGM it was reported that fixtures had been arranged, players signed and guarantors found for a new professional rugby club in Merthyr.

In July 1907 a Merthyr Tydfil rugby league team joined the Northern Union and the Northern Rugby League.

=== 1907-08 season ===
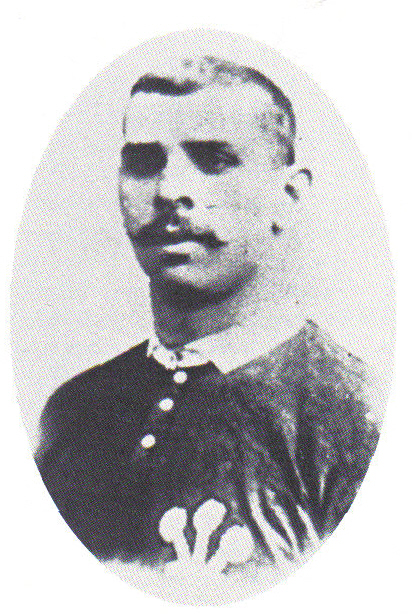
Dai "Tarw" ("Bull") Jones

Merthyr Tydfil played their first Northern Union match on 7 September 1907, a home game to Oldham which Merthyr lost 25-6. Merthyr continued to struggle against the more established northern teams, losing ten games in succession, though they had close matches with Batley (4-5), Broughton Rangers (10-14) and Bradford Northern (6-8). During their ten match losing run, they lost their first ever all-Welsh encounter, when Ebbw Vale beat them 2-0, and on 2 November they were beaten by the very first touring New Zealand side. Merthyr's first victory came on 16 November 1907, when they beat Runcorn at home. By the end of 1907 they had picked up more points in the Northern Rugby League, with wins over Widnes and Ebbw Vale, and a draw with Huddersfield.

On 1 January 1908, the first true international rugby league match took place. Played on Ynys Field in Aberdare, the game was contested by Wales and New Zealand. Merthyr supplied two of its players to the first Wales team: David "Dai" Davies, and Dai "Tarw" Jones, a former rugby union international, who scored the winning try to give Wales their first victory.

As the season continued, Merthyr's performances on the pitch improved, with wins over Huddersfield, York, Leigh, Wakefield Trinity and a high-flying Hunslet. All the wins came at home, and their away form was poor. They finished the season with only eight wins and one draw out of thirty games, coming 23rd out of 27 clubs; but the League run was still seen as a success for a first season. Merthyr also managed to progress to the third round of the Challenge Cup after wins over Beverley and Whitehaven.

A more worrying matter for the club than their league position was the gate receipts. The season opener against Oldham attracted between 2000 and 3000 spectators, a disappointing number, though the weather was poor and the admission price a bit high. The more established Northern teams such as Broughton attracted a crowd of 4000, while the clash between Merthyr and the New Zealand national team brought in between 8000 and 12,000 people. Crowd control was sometimes an issue, and the College ground was suspended for two weeks after the Rochdale Hornets game, after the referee reported he had been 'molested' by the spectators.

=== 1908-09 season ===
Duncan McGregor

The 1908-09 season saw the first real attempt to bring rugby league to Wales: four new Welsh teams were formed, Aberdare, Barry, Mid-Rhondda and Treherbert. This allowed the formation of the Welsh League, but that in turn meant fewer games against the Northern opposition, as the ten fixtures of the Welsh League replaced ten matches against English teams.

Merthyr started the season with one of their biggest signings when they acquired the services of Duncan McGregor, an ex-New Zealand dual-code rugby international. Unfortunately for Merthyr, he injured his ankle in his début match, and was an infrequent member of the first team. The club was then forced to recruit local amateurs to fill their ranks, though they did gain the services of Tom Thomas from Wigan for £60 (based on increases in average earnings, this would be approximately £21,100 in 2013), an amount the club treasurer claimed he paid himself.

The season was of mixed fortunes for Merthyr: it was the club's most successful in the Northern Rugby League, but they were average at best in the matches in the Welsh League. Merthyr still struggled away from home, though they achieved their first away victory over English opposition when they beat Barrow in November 1908. Merthyr had a good Northern League season through their victories over their fellow Welsh clubs, winning nine matches out of eleven encounters. In comparison, they only won twice and drew once out of seven matches against the Northern clubs. These results left Merthyr eighth out of 31, the best result achieved by any Welsh club in the early 20th century. The results in the Welsh League were not as impressive, winning five and losing five. The most telling results were the home and away losses to both Ebbw Vale and Mid-Rhondda, the teams that ended first and second respectively, leaving Merthyr third out of six teams.

Wales played just one international match during the season, away to England. Merthyr provided two players to the game Thomas Paddison and David Davies. Merthyr also faced their second international opposition during the season, when the touring Australian team came to College Park. Merthyr beat the tourists 15-13, and also supplied eight players to a Welsh League XIII who defeated the Australian team on 16 January 1909.

Crowds for the season were between 3000 and 4000 for most matches; even the touring Australian team mustered a gate of 4000. The best crowd of the season was when Ebbw Vale visited in December for their Northern League encounter, when 5000 people watched the match.

=== 1909-10 season ===
With the collapse of half of the Welsh teams before the start of the season, the Welsh League now consisted of just Merthyr, Ebbw Vale and Treherbert. Further problems emerged when Merthyr began losing some of their best talent to the Northern clubs. J. Cowmeadow, a prolific winger who scored the winning try for the Welsh League XIII against Australia, was signed to York City Knights. He was followed later in the season by forward player Dan Lewis, before David "Dai" Davies and Fullback Palmer Griffiths were signed by Swinton.

The season also saw a marked decline in attendance figures, with many supporters switching their allegiance to local association football team Merthyr Town. Matters were made worse when Merthyr Tydfil switched grounds from College Park to the Rhydycar Ground on the outskirts of the town. Despite a change of venue, the crowds were still boisterous, and after a defeat to Dewsbury the supporters pelted the referee with clinker, cutting his head. The Rhydycar Ground was suspended for four weeks, and the club treasurer was also suspended when he claimed the club had no money to pay the referee.

On the pitch, the team failed to build on the previous season's success, and struggled to win matches. In the Welsh League they finished second from three, and in the Northern League they managed only two wins, both at home, over Treherbert and Warrington. Their away record was awful, losing all encounters, some very heavily, including 0-56 to Warrington and 0-67 to Wigan. They ended the Northern League with two wins, a draw and 18 losses, finishing 27th out of 28 clubs, one place ahead of Treherbert.

Wales played in two international games during this season, both against England. In the first game on 4 December 1909, Wales travelled to Belle Vue, Wakefield, Merthyr saw David "Dai" Davies collect his fourth consecutive cap. The second encounter was played at Ebbw Vale's Bridge End Field; three Merthyr players were selected: Rhys Rees, David "Dai" Davies and Dan Lewis.

=== 1910-1911 ===
With Treherbert folding during the mid-season break, Merthyr and Ebbw Vale were the only remaining Welsh clubs, so the Welsh League was abandoned. The season began with four straight losses in September, followed by an away defeat to Warrington. On 8 October, Merthyr were humiliated 13-70 by Hull Kingston Rovers. It was reported that the team 'cut a ridiculous figure' during the match, and the club officials 'realised that if they were to retain public support the tide of defeats would have to be stemmed'. Merthyr rose to the challenge briefly, beating Barrow and Bradford Northern in the next two games, but their form slipped again and these results were followed by four more losses. By the end of December Merthyr had played 18 games, with five wins and 13 losses. On 31 December 1910, the team faced Coventry in the Challenge Cup, and lost 18-3. This was the club's last game: in January, with finances spiralling out of control and the season only half played, the club ceased to exist.

=== Club demise ===
Although Merthyr Tydfil was facing a bleak future due to competition from Merthyr Town AFC, its demise was hastened by poor administration. In December 1909 it was reported that 'as usual several selected players failed to turn up' for a match against Treherbert, and as players were paid to play, this pointed at problems with the payment of salaries. Unlike other clubs, Merthyr never set themselves up as a limited company, and there was confusion as to who employed the players. Further evidence of the general managerial confusion behind the club was revealed when Messrs Ellison & Co. took legal action against the club about an unpaid bill for hiring of turnstiles. At the hearing at Merthyr County Court in December 1910, the judge asked the club secretary who was running the club; the secretary replied that he did not know.

In January 1911, after the club's final game, the former club secretary J.B. Evans reported to the Merthyr Express that the club had been initially backed by two bonds totalling £760, but by the end of the second season the club was in debt for £473. It was then decided to float the club as a company, but although directors were appointed, no flotation took place.

== Players of note ==
Players earning international caps while at Merthyr Tydfil RLFC

- J. Cowmeadow represented Welsh League XIII who beat Australia 14-13 Penydarren Park on 19 January 1909
- David "Dai" Davies won four caps for Wales between 1908 and 1910
- Dai "Tarw" Jones won one cap for Wales in 1908 against New Zealand, and won two caps for Great Britain in 1908 against New Zealand
- Dan Lewis won one cap for Wales in 1910
- Thomas John Paddison won one cap for Wales in 1908
- Rhys Rees won two caps for Wales between 1908 and 1910

Other international players

- Duncan McGregor former New Zealand Dual-code international

== Reintroduction of rugby league in Merthyr Tydfil ==
Almost a century after the club collapsed, the Tydfil Wildcats Rugby League reintroduced rugby league in the area. Playing at the Grove Field, the Wildcats grew from junior sides in the 2008 season to include adult sides for the first time in 2010.

== Bibliography ==
- Gate, Robert (1986). Gone North: Volume 1. Ripponden: R.E. Gate. ISBN 0-9511190-0-1.
- Haynes, John (2007). All Blacks to All Golds. Brighouse: League Publications Ltd. ISBN 978-1-901347-17-3.
- Lush, Peter; Farrar, Dave (1998). Tries in the Valley: A History of Rugby League in Wales. London: London League Publications. ISBN 0-9526064-3-7.
- Smith, David; Williams, Gareth (1980). Fields of Praise: The Official History of The Welsh Rugby Union. Cardiff: University of Wales Press. ISBN 0-7083-0766-3.
