= Treherbert RLFC =

Defunct Welsh rugby league club, based in Treherbert

Treherbert R.L.F.C.
Club information
- Full name: Treherbert Rugby League Football Club
- Founded: April 1908; 118 years ago
- Exited: 1910; 116 years ago

Former details
- Ground: Athletic Ground
- Competition: Welsh League; Northern Rugby League
- 1910: 28th

Treherbert Rugby League Football Club was a professional rugby league club based in Treherbert, Wales playing in the Welsh League and Northern Union. Based at the Athletic Ground, Treherbert were one of the first professional Welsh teams, formed in 1908 but folding after just two seasons. Treherbert also produced a single player, David Galloway, who gained international caps directly from the team.

== Formation ==
In 1908 Treherbert was a large village at the head of the Rhondda Valley, a heavy industrial coal mining area. The village already had a rugby union team, Treherbert RFC, but after the creation of two rugby league clubs in 1907, Merthyr Tydfil and Ebbw Vale, attempts were made to form a professional team to play in the Northern Rugby League. In April 1908, the Treherbert and District Northern Union Club Ltd was formed with capital of £500. The team played at the Athletic Ground in the village, and set their headquarters at the local pub, the Dunraven Hotel. Treherbert were admitted to the Northern Union on 30 June 1908, along with fellow Rhondda team Mid-Rhondda. Treherbert not only joined the Northern Union, but with the addition of Barry and Aberdare, the six newly formed teams set up the Welsh League.

== Club history ==
=== 1908-1909 ===
Treherbert's first game of the 1908/09 season was on 5 September 1908 against fellow Welsh club Barry, Treherbert lost 3-6. A week later the club faced their first team from the Northern Leagues, a home tie with Halifax which Treherbert being outscored seven tries to two, losing 6-27. The very next game was against Mid-Rhondda, and resulted in Treherbert's first win. Although failing to beat the north of England teams, they continued to do well against their fellow Welsh teams. On 17 December 1908, Treherbert faced the touring Australian national team. In front of a crowd of 4000, the Welsh club lost to Australia by a narrow 3-6 score, the 'Kangaroos' outscoring Treherbert by two tries to one. Treherbert's results continued to be poor in the second half of the season, including a heavy 29-0 defeat away to Dewsbury. More difficulties occurred when, in a 10-0 defeat by Merthyr Tydfil RLFC, two newly acquired players, Bob Williams and H. Harding, were prevented from playing after their joining forms had been 'destroyed'. After a further loss to Ebbw Vale and a draw with Barry, Treherbert faced Merthyr Tydfil again, this time a Welsh League match. Treherbert's win over Merthyr Tydfil was described as 'one of the greatest surprises of the football season', but bad followed good, when in the last game of the season, in a Welsh League encounter with Mid-Rhondda, the referee left the pitch before the end of the game in protest of both teams' rough play.

Treherbert finished their first season with four wins, a draw and 13 losses, finishing 28th out of 31 clubs.

=== 1909-1910 ===
Treherbert's second season was also their last, Barry, Aberdare and Mid-Rhondda had all already folded after just a single season, leaving only three clubs to contest the Welsh League. The season was a poor experience on and off the pitch, starting with a 10-22 loss to Hull Kingston Rovers, in which Alfred Francis scored one of Treherbert's two tries, which was followed by a further 11 straight losses. To complicate matters further, the attendance figures at home matches were poor, last minute team changes were frequent and their club secretary, H.R. Jones, resigned during the season. The only good news the club received was when one of their forwards, David Galloway was selected for the Wales national team, in a late 1909 away encounter with England. Galloway did enough to impress as four months later he was reselected for the national team again, again against England, but this time played on home soil at Ebbw Vale's Bridge End Field.

On 12 February 1910, Treherbert played their last home game, a 5-7 loss to Merthyr. The next Monday, the team failed to appear for the Welsh League clash with Ebbw Vale. They then failed to honour an away fixture with Hull Kingston Rovers, who instead arranged a match with a newly formed Coventry team instead. Almost two months after their last home game, Treherbert managed to put together a team to face Oldham, a terrible 13-54 loss. After the game the press described Treherbert as 'pathetic'.

This was the end of Treherbert. At the Northern Rugby League's 1910 AGM in Huddersfield, the Northern Union secretary stated that Treherbert were defaulters and that although they had been given help by other clubs they had failed to fulfill their fixture list, and were therefore not eligible to return to the Union the following season. Treherbert were replaced the next season by Coventry and never played a league game again. In that final season they had completed only 12 games, for an aggregate score of 55-289.

The ground is now covered by light industry on the banks of the River Rhondda.

== Players of note ==
Players Earning International Caps While at Treherbert

- David Galloway won two caps for Wales while at Treherbert in 1909 and 1910 against England, and joined Hull F.C. in 1910

Other players

- Alfred Francis joined Hull F.C. in 1910, later won 2 caps for Wales, and toured on the 1914 Great Britain Lions tour of Australia and New Zealand

== Bibliography ==
- Gate, Robert (1986). Gone North: Volume 1. Ripponden: R.E. Gate. ISBN 0-9511190-0-1.
- Haynes, John (2007). All Blacks to All Golds. Brighouse: League Publications Ltd. ISBN 978-1-901347-17-3.
- Lush, Peter; Farrar, Dave (1998). Tries in the Valley: A History of Rugby League in Wales. London: London League Publications. ISBN 0-9526064-3-7.
- Smith, David; Williams, Gareth (1980). Fields of Praise: The Official History of The Welsh Rugby Union. Cardiff: University of Wales Press. ISBN 0-7083-0766-3.
