= Ynys (Aberdare) =

Multipurpose sports venue

The Ynys
- Yr Ynys
- Interactive map of The Ynys
- Former names: Ynys Meadows; Ynys Fields; Ynys Grounds; The Ynys Athletic Ground; The Athletic Ground
- Location: Aberdare, Wales
- Coordinates: 51.7127°N 3.4374°W
- Surface: Grass
- Record attendance: 40,000 (for Rugby League)

Construction
- Renovated: 1893; 1920 (for Soccer); 1971 (for Rugby Union); 2008 (for Cricket)

Tenants
- Aberdare RFC; 1890–present Aberdare Athletic F.C. 1893–1928; Aberdare RLFC; 1908–1909; Aberdare CC; 1968–present Aberdare Valley AAC; 2008–present

The Ynys (Welsh: Yr Ynys) is an historic mixed sports venue in Aberdare, Wales. The ground is notable as the venue of the first ever international match in Rugby League history, and was also home to the professional rugby league club Aberdare RLFC as well as English Football League members Aberdare Athletic F.C.

Today the Ynys hosts the Aberdare Rugby Union Club, Aberdare Cricket team and Aberdare Valley AAC, as well as the Sobell Leisure Centre and the Ron Jones Athletics Stadium.

== Name ==
The Welsh word Ynys (cognate with the Irish language innis), is commonly translated as island. However, it can also mean a flood plain, peninsula or river meadow. It is a common toponym in the South Wales Valleys, denoting a flat area of land along the banks of a river. As such, a number of places named Ynys were found around the modern playing fields.^{nb}

== History ==
=== Early history ===
Aberdare was described as "very remarkable" for its traditions of Taplasau Hâf (summer games), rhedegfeydi (races) and gwrolgampau (manly sports) as early as 1853. Although it is unknown when the Ynys was first used for sport, a number of special areas had been set aside by the townsfolk for these games since at least the 1640s, with the three most prominent being at Ton-glwyd-fawr (also known in English as "The Ton" in Cwmdare), Tontypel in Cefnpennar and "a small ynys on the shore of Cynon". The text explicitly names this "Ynys" as Glan-rhyd-y-gored near Llwycoed Mill, someway up river from the current playing fields.

By 1875, The Ynys was under the supervision of the Abernant ironmaster, Richard Fothergill who continued to use the land as a place for fêtes and athletic tournaments. As Fothergill was leasing the grounds to local societies, the area continued to be set aside and remained largely undeveloped, despite the rapid growth of Aberdare and the Ynys' situation as flat open land between the town's two main railways stations. In August 1875, the Ynys hosted the first of an annual athletic tournament which would also include equestrian events and a brass band competition. These events were sponsored by the town's hostilaries and attracted crowds of up to 10,000.

=== 1890-1920 ===
Rugby Union was established at the Ynys sometime before 1890, when Aberdare RFC first started playing there. Three years later, an Association Football club was also established at the grounds, when it became the home of the newly formed Aberdare Athletic F.C.

The first decade of the twentieth century saw the rise of Aberdare as a force in Rugby Union, the club had great success, especially from 1905 to 1907 when local star Dai 'Tarw' Jones, captained the club. However, the club was soon embroiled in the professionalism scandal with the Welsh Rugby Union, the repercussions of which would see a number of players banned from the sport. Jones himself was subjected to a lifetime ban, which would ultimately lead to a change of focus at the Ynys.

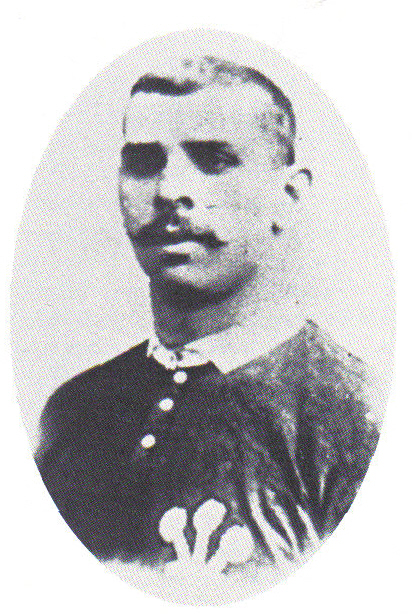
Dai "Tarw" Jones, formerly of Aberdare's rugby union team would score the winning try in Wales' victory over New Zealand at the Ynys.

At the time, the Northern Union was looking to establish professional Rugby League teams across south Wales. Just a few months after the Welsh Rugby Union had sanctioned Aberdare RFC, the Ynys was the chosen venue of the Northern Union to host venue of the first ever rugby league international, between Wales and the touring New Zealand team as part of their 1907–08 tour of Great Britain. The match took place on 1 January 1908, with 15,000 fans travelling to the grounds to see Wales win a close match 9–8.

The success of the match and the large number of paying spectators (gate receipts were reported as £560), highlighted the commercial potential of the Ynys. Discussions on the establishment of a Rugby League club in Aberdare advanced quickly and on 21 July 1908, Aberdare RLFC were admitted to the Northern Union's Rugby League. On 5 September 1908 the new Aberdare team played their first match at the Ynys, hosting Wigan in front of a crowd of 3,000. The potential of the venue was again demonstrated on 10 November 1908, when the Ynys hosted its second international side as 5,000 spectators watched Aberdare take on the first touring Australian team. However the Aberdare club side could not replicate the heroics of the Welsh team, losing the match 10–37. Indeed, Aberdare struggled under Northern Union rules and initially high crowd numbers deteriorated with the poor results, which saw Aberdare finishing their only season in the Rugby Football League as the bottom club. Finally on 10 July 1909, Aberdare reported 'unexpected difficulties' in its finances and resigned from the Northern Rugby League.

=== 1920-1968 ===
Despite the loss of professional rugby league, the Ynys continued to host a variety of sporting events. By 1920 it was home to a competitive cycle track and a small grandstand had been constructed. However, the cycle track was removed in that year as part of the redevelopments that would allow Aberdare Athletic gain entry to the Football League. On 14 May 1921 the Ynys would host 22,584 fans for a schoolboy soccer international between Wales and England a record attendance for a soccer match at the ground. This was quickly followed by the election of the Aberdare Athletic FC to the Football League for the following season.

On the 7th of November 1923, when a large fire destroyed the main stand, club offices and all of the player's kit. It was evident that the soccer club was in serious financial trouble by the end of the 1927 season, and Aberdare were voted out of the Football League. As a result, Aberdare Athletic folded. However, association football continued in the town as Aberaman Athletic (who had merged with Aberdare Athletic the previous year) broke off and continued to play games away from the Ynys at Aberaman.

The Ynys would go on to host greyhound racing with a race distance of 475 yards. The first official events taking place on 26 December 1932, and three years later, the first international rugby union side came to the Ynys. The 1935-36 All Blacks played a tour match against a combined "Mid-Districts" team on 12 December 1935. In front of a crowd of 6,000, the All Blacks won the match 31–10.

The Greyhound Track was updated in 1959 with "an Inside Sumner hare installed at a cost of £1400". At its height, Greyhound racing at the Ynys would see as many twenty bookmakers attend the meetings, however, by the 1960s this had fallen to just seven when an apparent downturn in the number of greyhound entrants seems to have resulted in the venues closure and demolition in the late 1960s.

=== 1968-1990 ===
Cricket returned to the Ynys in 1968 when the Riverside Cricket Club (named for its location near the banks of the river) was re-established.

Rugby Union club matches finally returned to the Ynys in the 1960s, when Aberaman RFC began to play fixtures at the old Aberdare ground. By February 1971, a clubhouse was established near the grounds, which was followed by the construction of a larger grandstand costing £20,000.

=== 21st century ===
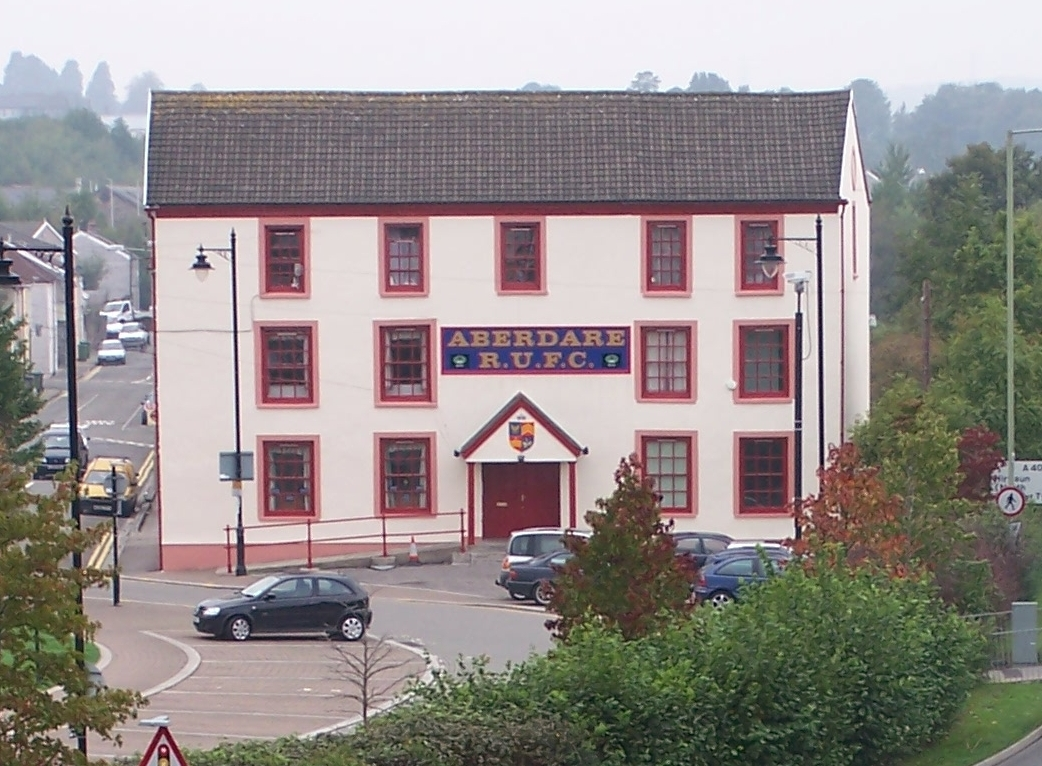
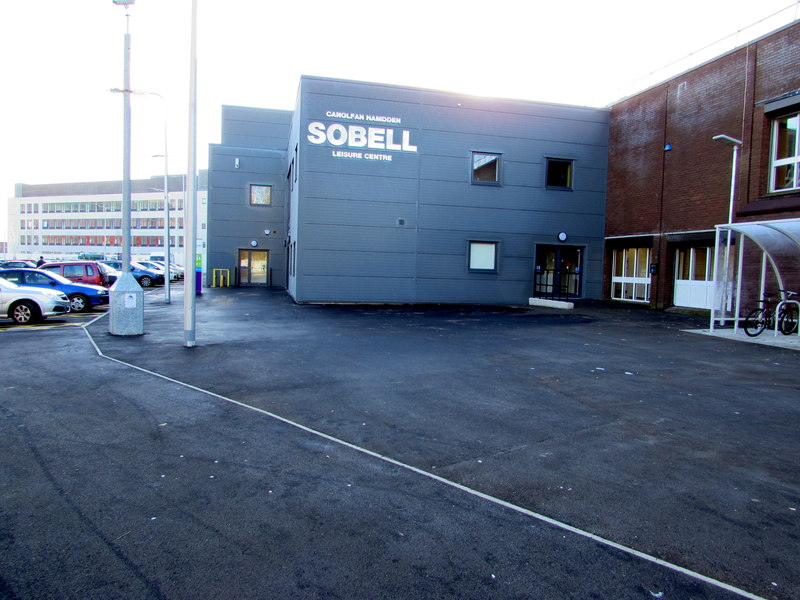
Aberdare Rugby Club near the Ynys and the Sobell Leisure Centre

Following the professionalisation of rugby union in 1995, the WRU sanctions against Aberdare were no longer applicable and the Aberaman club (now firmly established at the Ynys instead of Aberaman), took the name Aberdare RUFC once again. The cricket club was also now known as Aberdare CC, and was granted a 25-year lease on the land outside the boundary of the Ynys' pitch 1 in 2008, where a club house and training nets would be built, followed by a Community Hub and Café in the 2010s.

Together with the town's Rugby union and cricket teams, the Ynys now hosts many other sporting facilities constructed in the early twenty-first century. along with a redevelopment of the Sobell Leisure Centre the Ron Jones Athletics Stadium was constructed, featuring a 263-seat stadium with crumb rubber track and field sports facilities. The stadium is also home to Aberdare Valley AAC.
