= Aberdare RFC =

Welsh rugby union club, based in Aberdare, Wales

(Wales) Aberdare RFC
- Full name: Aberdare Rugby Union Football Club
- Nickname: The Snakes
- Founded: 1890; 136 years ago
- Location: Aberdare, Wales
- Ground: Ynys Stadium (Capacity: 500)
- Chairman: Darrell Williams
- President: Colin Davies
- Coach(es): Martyn Fowler & Rhys Jones
- Captain: Owen Young
- League: WRU Championship East
Team kit

Official website
- aberdare.rfc.wales

Aberdare Rugby Football Club is a rugby union club based in the town of Aberdare, Wales. Aberdare RFC play in the Welsh Rugby Union Championship (East) Division and is a feeder club to Cardiff Rugby.

== Club history ==
The first mention of an Aberdare club came in 1876, when a team lost by two tries playing at Merthyr on 30 November. In September 1883 it was decided to "re-start" the Aberdare club.

Aberdare RUFC began as Aberaman Rugby Football Club, a team formed in 1890, though the earliest written conformation of their existence is from a match in 1895 against a team from Ferndale. In the early 1900s the team joined the Glamorgan league, playing other coal mining towns such as Maesteg, Treorchy and Treherbert.

In 1907 Aberdare were involved in an early rugby scandal linked to professionalism. Local collier Dai 'Tarw' Jones was one of Aberdare's star players and captained the club from 1905 to 1907. For his services to the club he was paid 10 shillings a week along with meal costs and train fares. When the club cut the wage to 5 shillings, Jones switched allegiance to Treherbert, commuting from his home town of Aberdare on match days. Aberdare's ex-secretary E. Rees in 1907 made several allegations in the press that broke multiple union rules. Not only did he mention the wages but also stated that leading teams had been paid to visit the town and stated Aberdare was involved in match fixing. During the 1904/05 season, Aberdare won the Glamorgan League by beating Treorchy in the last match. Rees claimed that Treorchy had agreed to lose the game for £15.

The resulting investigation from the WRU, at the time still called the Welsh Football Union, spread far further than the two clubs mentioned by Rees. The union saw 6 players temporarily suspended, including Welsh international Fred Scrine, Merthyr escaped with a warning but Treorchy and Aberdare saw the permanent suspension of their entire committees. The union also permanently suspended eight players, including Jones who switched to rugby league. The events of the investigation led to bad feeling in the rugby community of Aberdare, and was a major factor in Aberdare founding Aberdare RLFC, one of the first professional rugby league clubs and member of the Welsh League.

== Recent history ==
Aberdare RFC, a prominent club in Welsh Rugby Union, has seen notable achievements and milestones in recent years, marking significant moments in its long-standing history.

2016: League Champions of Welsh Rugby Union Division 3 East Central 'A'

On Wednesday, April 27, 2016, Aberdare RFC secured Welsh Rugby Union Division 3 East Central 'A' league title with a decisive 47-30 victory over Cardiff's Fairwater RFC. Under the leadership of Captain Daniel William Lewis, the squad dominated the season with an aggressive, high-scoring style of play, finishing with over 100 tries and 700 points. Losing only once throughout the entire campaign, the team's championship's win provided a fitting highlight to the club's 125th Anniversary celebrations.

2017: Mid District Bowl Final Victory In May 2017, Aberdare RFC emerged victorious in the Mid District Bowl Final against Llantrisant RFC, held at Sardis Road, Pontypridd. The final scoreline of 40-18 demonstrated Aberdare's prowess on the field, securing another prestigious title for the club.

2023: Division 2 Cup Final, Mid District Bowl Winners & Promotion to Division 1 East Central On 8 April 2023 Aberdare RFC faced Morriston RFC in the Welsh Rugby Union Division 2 Cup Final at the Principality Stadium in Cardiff. Despite a valiant effort, Aberdare fell short as Morriston claimed victory with a score of 17–12. Nevertheless, the final drew an impressive crowd of over 700 Aberdare supporters, reflecting the club's strong fan base and community support.

However, Aberdare's fortunes turned on 6 May 2023 when they secured promotion to the Welsh Rugby Union Division 1 East Central for the first time in their history, marking a significant milestone in their journey.

On Wednesday 17 May 2023, Aberdare RFC played Abercwmboi RFC in Mid District Bowl Final at Sardis Road, Pontypridd. The match ended 19–19 with Aberdare winning 3–1 on Try count.

2024: Promotion to Welsh Rugby Union National League Championship The momentum continued in April 2024 when Aberdare RFC achieved yet another historic milestone by securing promotion to the Welsh Rugby Union National League Championship for the first time in their history. This triumph, achieved after defeating Mountain Ash.

== Current Players ==
2025/26 Senior Squad

- (Wales) Owen Young - Club Captain
- (Wales) Jarrad Rees - Club Vice-Captain
- (Wales) Ben Bowen - Athletic Captain
- (Wales) Ethan Wynne - Athletic Vice-Captain
- (Wales) Daniel Lewis
- (Wales) Daniel Shanahan
- (Wales) Steffan Moseley
- (Wales) Leon Caviel
- (Wales) Kian Carter
- (Wales) Owen Candemir
- (Wales) Taylor Burnett
- (Wales) Josh Bowditch
- (Wales) Ben Miller
- (Wales) Matthew Lloyd
- (Wales) Jarrad Hippsley
- (Wales) Kian Stephens
- (Wales) Jon Watts
- (Wales) Tyler Hiscox
- (Wales) Jarrad Rees
- (Wales) Jamie Price
- (Wales) Cameron Samuel
- (Wales) Louis O'Neil
- (Wales) Jac Lewis
- (Wales) Connor Lacey
- (Wales) Nathan Terry
- (Wales) Gary Williams
- (Wales) Dafydd Stonelake
- (Wales) Ethan Davies
- (Wales) Noah Bradbeer
- (Wales) Ethan Wynne
- (Wales) Mitchell Griffiths
- (Wales) Tom Waythe
- (Wales) Josh Crew
- (Wales) Dylan Draper
- (Wales) Jacob Breese
- (Wales) Rhys Turner
- (Wales) Gavin Barrett
- (Wales) Levi Brittain
- (Wales) Jack Lewis
- (Wales) Ryan Davies
- (Wales) Alex Evans
- (Wales) Steffan Moseley
- (Wales) Ieuan Archer
- (Wales) Fin Shellard
- (Wales) Nathan Thomas
- (Wales) Noah Phillips
- (Wales) David Payne
- (Wales) Josh Muxworthy
- (Wales) Jordan O'Neil
- (Wales) Adam Fenlon
- (Wales) Nicholas Evans
- (Wales) Harry Davies
- (Wales) Alex Bowditch
- (Wales) Eamon Fenech

== Club Honours ==
19th Century:

- 1899/1900 Glamorgan Press Cup Winners

20th Century:

- 1901/02 Glamorgan Times Cup Winners
- 1904/05 Glamorgan League Champions
- 1982/83 Mid District Section D Champions

21st Century:

- 2004/05 WRU 4 South East Runners Up
- 2007/08 WRU 4 South East Runners Up
- 2014/15 WRU 3 East Central (B) Runners Up
- 2015/16 WRU 3 East Central (A) Champions
- 2016/17 Mid District Bowl Winners
- 2022/23 WRU 2 East Central Runners Up
- 2022/23 WRU Division 2 Cup Runners Up
- 2022/23 Mid District Bowl Winners
- 2022/23 Silver Ball Quarter-Finalists
- 2023/24 WRU 1 East Central Runners Up

== Notable players ==
British & Irish Lions:

- (Wales) Dai Young (3 caps)
- (Wales) Keith Rowlands (3 caps)
- (Wales) William Morgan (2 caps)

Wales:

- (Wales) Dai Young (51 Caps)
- (Wales) Dai 'Tarw' Jones (13 Caps)
- (Wales) Dai Evans (12 Caps)
- (Wales) Alex Mann (11 Caps)
- (Wales) Keith Rowlands (5 Caps)
- (Wales) Owen Williams (4 Caps)
- (Wales) Thomas Young (4 Caps)
- (Wales) William Morgan (1 Caps)

Wales 7s:

- (Wales) Rhys Shellard
- (Wales) Owen Williams

Other Internationals:

- (United States) Aaron Freeman (2 caps)
