= Welsh League =

Rugby league competition in Wales (1908-09)

- Sport: Rugby league
- Instituted: 1908
- Ceased: 1909
- Number of teams: 6 (1908); 3 (1909)
- Country: Wales
- Most titles: Ebbw Vale RLFC (2 titles)

The Welsh League was the first club rugby league competition in Wales. Its inaugural season was in 1908/09 when four additional teams were formed to join Ebbw Vale RLFC and Merthyr Tydfil RLFC, which allowed a league tournament to take place. The Welsh League ran for just two seasons, after three of the teams, Aberdare, Barry and Mid-Rhondda left the Northern Union and ceased playing rugby in the first season; followed by the collapse of Treherbert in 1910. Both seasons were won by Ebbw Vale.

== History ==
=== The first rugby league clubs ===
South Wales in the late 19th and early 20th century was a staunch rugby union area, with little interest in association football, which was seen as a north Wales sport, or the emerging professional Northern Union game, which would eventually be known as rugby league. The problem facing the Welsh Rugby Union, the governing body of rugby union in Wales, was the problem keeping union an amateur sport during a period which saw fluctuating prosperity in an industrialised south Wales. The Northern Union paid players per match, offered large signing on fees, found jobs and even found houses for some of their bigger stars. Under rugby union rules, players were not even allowed to accept trivial monies such as travelling expenses, or be found guilt of professionalism and suspended, or more likely banned from the sport for life.

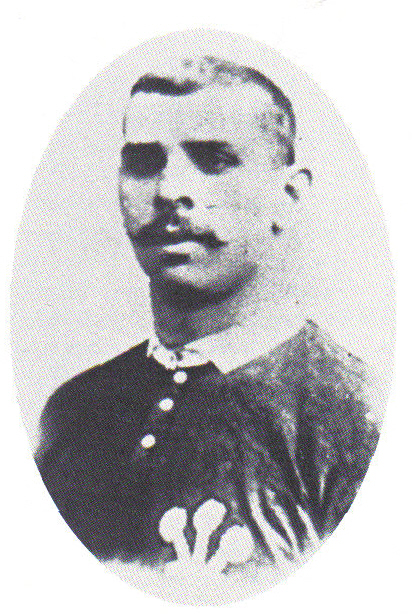
Dai "Tarw" Jones, suspended from rugby union, later becoming a league player with Merthyr

To prevent losing their star players, many rugby union clubs secretly paid their players a small amount of money for each match played. The first real challenge to the WRU came in 1907, when two events triggered an investigation into the dealings of several clubs, mainly Aberdare RFC, Merthyr Alexandra RFC and Treorchy RFC. It began when E.M. Rees, the ex-Secretary of Aberdare, blew the whistle on player payments. Rees made three claims in the local press, firstly that all players at his former club were receiving hidden wages, secondly that Aberdare had received a payment of £15 from rivals Treorchy to throw a crucial League match, and finally that Merthyr Alexandria had demanded a payment of £7 5s to bring his team to play Aberdare. The most notable player to be named in the scandal, was Dai "Tarw" Jones, an internationally capped player for Wales, and hero of the famous 1905 Welsh victory over the first touring New Zealand team. Aberdare were accused of paying their players 10 shillings a week, as well as free meals and travel expenses. Jones had switched from his old club Treherbert RFC in 1902 to join Aberdare, but in 1906, Aberdare were forced to cut their 'wages' from 10 shillings to five, to combat mounting debts. Jones had taken offence at this and switched back to Treherbert.

The WRU held an investigation into all the allegations, and the sub-committees final report, published in September 1907 asserted that the allegations of professionalism being "rampant in Welsh clubs" were not proven, although they did find evidence of certain clubs giving additional payments to their players. The Union's reaction was incisive but unbalanced. Temporary suspensions were given to six players, including Swansea's Fred Scrine, the permanent suspension of the entire Aberdare and Treorchy committees, and the permanent suspension of eight player from the sport of rugby union, including Dai Jones. Although Merthyr Alexandria were let off with just a warning. The reason for the leniency shown to Merthyr is thought to have been connected to the club's apparent move to the professional Northern code. Merthyr Alexandria, had proposed in their AGM of 1907 to turn away from amateurism and join the Northern Union. Although the motion was heavily defeated, the week after the AGM it was reported that fixtures had been arranged, players signed and guarantors found for a new 'professional rugby club' in the town. In July 1907 a new Merthyr Tydfil league team joined the Northern Rugby Union. It was therefore believed the WRU did not suspend or punish Merthyr Alexandria to prevent the squad converting to the newly formed league team. Just prior to the formation of Merthyr Tydfil RLFC, Ebbw Vale RFC had decided to switch from the union game and joined the Northern Union because the members were enraged at the "...bogus amateurism in the Monmouthshire League". Both these clubs formed the first professional challenge from Wales in the Northern League finishing 23rd (Merthyr) and 26th (Ebbw Vale) out of 27 teams in their first season.

=== The spread of professional rugby ===
Before the start of the 1908/09 season, two important matches took place that helped spread the appeal of Northern Union rugby. The first match saw the Wales rugby league team, take on their counterparts from New Zealand in the first true international rugby league game in world history. The team consisted of Welsh exiles form the Northern Union teams, plus two players from both Ebbw Vale (Chick Jenkins and Oliver Burgham) and Merthyr Tydfil (Dai "Tarw" Jones and David Davies). Rather than playing the game at either Ebbw Vale or Merthyr, the neutral ground of Aberdare Athletic Ground was chosen by the Northern Union. An earlier attempt to produce a professional team in Aberdare had failed, despite the fact that the town had been at the centre of the "shamateurism" row; mainly due to a failure to achieve financial backing and a failure to secure a playing field. After a crowd of 15000 paid £560 to watch Wales win 9-8, and the commercial potential of a Northern Union club became more apparent. A group of 'tradesmen and sportsmen' met in March 1908 to agree financing, and from this Aberdare RLFC was formed.

The second match was another international, this time the first encounter between Wales and England on 20 April 1908. In similar circumstances the Northern Union chose another venue where professional sympathies lay, this time Tonypandy in the Rhondda Valley. Just a few weeks after the game, Tonypandy saw the emergence of their own Northern team, Mid-Rhondda. A second Rhondda team also formed at almost the same time, Treherbert RLFC joined the Union in April. The sixth and final Welsh team, Barry, joined at the same time, and they played their first match in September, against Treherbert.

=== Welsh League XIII ===
A Welsh League XIII was formed to face the Australia national rugby league team on their first tour. The first league tourists were the New Zealand team in 1908, who faced the Wales team, but Australia did not face Wales so the Welsh League XIII was the closest the Kangaroos came to facing the national side. The Welsh League XIII was made up of players from all six teams, but the majority came from Merthyr, who supplied eight of the thirteen players. The Welsh League XIII faced the Australians at Merthyr in front of a crowd of 6000, and won the game by a narrow 14-13 scoreline. A Welsh League XIII also played Ebbw Vale at the end of the 1908/09 season.

=== Collapse of the Welsh League ===
The Welsh League lasted for just two seasons, and the 1909/10 tournament had just three teams competing. Simply the League failed because the clubs failed and with no new clubs emerging the first attempt at bringing rugby league to Wales came to an abrupt end. The new clubs faced hostility from the rugby union scene, class prejudice and the rise of a more popular professional game, association football. Though the biggest issues for the Welsh League were an inability to challenge the more established clubs for players, a lack of support from the Northern Union and the mismanagement of the Welsh clubs.

The Welsh League was weak in comparison with the more established northern clubs. Between the six clubs competing only one Welsh rugby union international was signed to their books, and that was Merthyr's Dai "Tarw" Jones. With little capital up front, they were seen as a poor alternative to players wishing to switch to the professional code. Ben Gronow was offered £25 and a job to join Ebbw Vale, yet he turned down the offer only to accept a fee of £125 to sign with Huddersfield. With few star players, the attendance at matches was low, and therefore the club takings suffered.

The Northern Union was also unhelpful in these early attempts at creating a Welsh League, expecting the Welsh clubs to take care of themselves. When Ebbw Vale and Merthyr formed in 1907, the Northern Union allowed a travel subsidy of £10 every time they played in the north, but after the election of the other four clubs, this subsidy was reduced to £5, despite the problems facing the new clubs. The Northern Union also showed little support in helping the new clubs cope with the challenges of professionalism, and few questions were asked about the background of the people running each business. By 1910, Merthyr's administration was described as shambolic with no one appearing to be running the club; while financially it was reliant on unsecured loans that helped precipitate its rapid demise.

"...many clubs would not mourn if trips to Monmouthshire were knocked on the head."

– Athletic News reporting in 1912 when Ebbw Vale, the last Welsh club, looked likely to fold

Although difficult to measure, the uncaring attitude of the northern clubs also had an effect on the Welsh game. One commentator stated, 'if the game there [South Wales] cannot be made self-supporting, clubs in the north should not be taxed to make good its weakness.' When Tom Thomas failed to settle in Wigan, his club placed a hefty £60 fee on his head to transfer back to Wales. Merthyr raised the fee with great difficulty, and although it made good business sense for Wigan to get the best price for a player of little future use to them, it was the sort of short-sightedness that damaged the sport in Wales. As often occurred, the member clubs' self-interest overrode the desire for expansion, and was yet another factor in the demise of rugby league in Wales and the Welsh League.

== Welsh League ==
When Aberdare and Barry joined the Northern Union on 21 July 1908, it was decided that with six Welsh teams a Welsh League could be formed. The Northern Union presented the League with a cup, valued at 50 guineas, for the Welsh champions.

=== 1908/1909 season ===
The first Welsh League tournament was contested between Aberdare, Barry, Ebbw Vale, Merthyr Tydfil, Mid-Rhondda and Treherbert. Each team was scheduled to play each other twice, home and away. As the Welsh teams were playing in the Welsh League and the Northern Rugby League, and both leagues were separate tournaments, each team would over the course of the season face each four times, twice in the Welsh League and twice in the Northern Rugby League.

The position of each team at the end of the season is decided on winning percentage. Winning percentage is calculated on games won plus half games drawn divided by games played. The teams are then ranked in order, with the club with the highest percentage as champions.

The first Welsh League was won by Ebbw Vale.

=== Table ===
Position	Club	Played	Won	Drawn	Lost	Pts For	Pts Agst	Points	Percent
1	Ebbw Vale RLFC	8	7	0	1	135	21	14	87.50%
2	Treherbert RLFC	8	4	1	3	64	105	9	56.25%
3	Mid-Rhondda RLFC	9	5	0	4	70	48	10	55.55%
4	Merthyr Tydfil RLFC	10	5	0	5	101	73	10	50.00%
5	Barry RLFC	6	1	1	4	20	102	3	25.00%
6	Aberdare RLFC	7	1	0	6	64	108	2	14.28%

==== 1908/09 Matches ====
24 October 1908

Mid-Rhondda	0 – 9	Ebbw Vale

Athletic Ground

31 October 1908

Aberdare	5 – 20	Treherbert

Ynys Field

2 January 1909

Merthyr Tydfil	24 – 0	Aberdare

College Field

30 January 1909

Barry	0 – 16	Merthyr Tydfil

Trinity Street

6 February 1909

Barry	3 – 11	Mid-Rhondda

Trinity Street

13 February 1909

Barry	2 – 19	Aberdare

Trinity Street

20 February 1909

Ebbw Vale	18 – 5	Treherbert

Bridge End Field

27 February 1909

Treherbert	7 – 7	Barry

Athletic Ground

13 March 1909

Treherbert	13 – 3	Merthyr Tydfil

Athletic Ground

20 March 1909

Mid-Rhondda	9 – 0	Aberdare

Athletic Ground

27 March 1909

Ebbw Vale	30 – 5	Aberdare

Bridge End Field

27 March 1909

Treherbert	7 – 15	Mid-Rhondda

Athletic Ground

27 March 1909

Merthyr Tydfil	8 – 11	Barry

College Park

1 April 1909

Merthyr Tydfil	0 – 3	Ebbw Vale

College Field

3 April 1909

Ebbw Vale	16 – 0	Mid-Rhondda

Bridge End Field

8 April 1909

Aberdare	0 – 14	Mid-Rhondda

Ynys Field

10 April 1909

Ebbw Vale	38 – 0	Barry

Bridge End Field

10 April 1909

Merthyr Tydfil	19 – 7	Treherbert

College Park

12 April 1909

Ebbw Vale	19 – 2	Merthyr Tydfil

Bridge End Field

17 April 1909

Treherbert	9 – 2	Ebbw Vale

Athletic Ground

17 April 1909

Merthyr Tyfdil	10 – 3	Mid-Rhondda

College Park

24 April 1909

Mid-Rhondda	5 – 2	Merthyr Tyfdil

Athletic Ground

26 April 1909

Mid-Rhondda	6 – 8	Treherbert

Athletic Ground

Unknown

Aberdare	5 – 21	Merthyr Tydfil

Ynys Field

=== 1909/1910 season ===
The second Welsh League tournament was contested between Ebbw Vale, Merthyr Tydfil and Treherbert. Each team was scheduled to play each other twice, home and away. As the Welsh teams were playing in the Welsh League and the Northern Rugby League, and both leagues were separate tournaments, each team would over the course of the season face each four times, twice in the Welsh League and twice in the Northern Rugby League.

The position of each team at the end of the season is decided on winning percentage. Winning percentage is calculated on games won plus half games drawn divided by games played. The teams are then ranked in order, with the club with the highest percentage as champions.

The second Welsh League was won by Ebbw Vale.

=== Table ===
Position	Club	Played	Won	Drawn	Lost	Pts For	Pts Agst	Points	Percent
1	Ebbw Vale RLFC	3	3	0	0	46	8	6	100.00%
2	Merthyr Tydfil RLFC	4	2	0	2	39	40	4	50.00%
3	Treherbert RLFC	3	0	0	3	5	42	0	00.00%

==== 1909/10 matches ====
26 December 1909

Merthyr Tyfdil	3 – 6	Ebbw Vale

Rhydycar Ground

1 January 1910

Merthyr Tyfdil	24 – 0	Treherbert

Rhydycar Ground

15 January 1910

Ebbw Vale	11 – 0	Treherbert

Bridge End Field

12 February 1909

Treherbert	5 – 7	Merthyr Tydfil

Athletic Ground

18 April 1910

Ebbw Vale	29 – 5	Merthyr Tydfil

Bridge End Field

== See also ==
- Rugby league in Wales

== Bibliography ==
- Gate, Robert (1986). Gone North: Volume 1. Ripponden: R.E. Gate. ISBN 0-9511190-0-1.
- Haynes, John (2007). All Blacks to All Golds. Brighouse: League Publications Ltd. ISBN 978-1-901347-17-3.
- Lush, Peter; Farrar, Dave (1998). Tries in the Valley: A History of Rugby League in Wales. London: London League Publications. ISBN 0-9526064-3-7.
- Smith, David; Williams, Gareth (1980). Fields of Praise: The Official History of The Welsh Rugby Union. Cardiff: University of Wales Press. ISBN 0-7083-0766-3.
