= Penydarren Park =

Sports stadium in Merthyr Tydfil, Wales

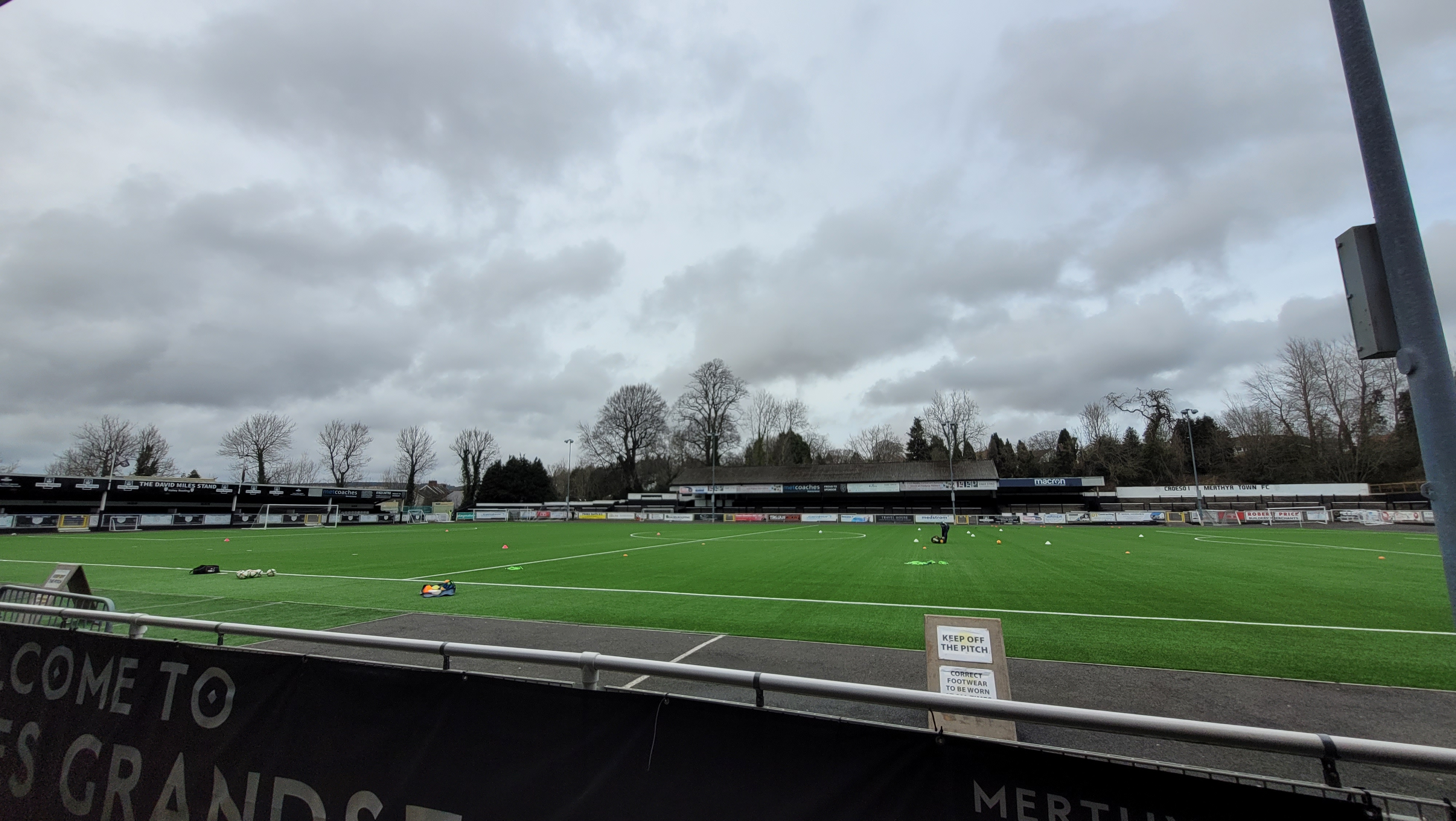
- Interactive map of Penydarren Park
- Full name: Penydarren Park
- Location: Merthyr Tydfil, Wales
- Coordinates: 51°45′4″N 3°22′40″W
- Owner: Merthyr Tydfil County Borough Council
- Operator: Merthyr Town
- Surface: Artificial turf

Tenants
- Merthyr Town F.C. (1909) (1908–1934); Merthyr Tydfil RLFC (1907–1910); Merthyr Tydfil F.C. (1945–2010); Merthyr Town F.C. (2010) (2011–present)

Penydarren Park is a sports stadium in Merthyr Tydfil, Wales, that is the present home ground of Merthyr Town. Historically used for varying sports, it has been the home to two professional football teams, Merthyr Town and Merthyr Tydfil F.C.

The stadium is one of two in Merthyr Tydfil, along with The Wern, home of Merthyr RFC.

== Early history ==
Penydarren Park is situated on a hill in the town of Merthyr Tydfil. The site was once used by the Romans for their local military encampment and during the industrial revolution it became part of the Penydarren House estate. In the latter half of the nineteenth century Penydarren Park was used by the locals as an open recreational for walks, athletic competitions and team sports. It was redeveloped in the 1890s with a cinder running track and a cycling track added to cater for the fad in foot and cycle racing. An early attempt to bring rugby league to Wales, saw local team Merthyr Tydfil RLFC set up at the rival College Ground. This in turn led to the larger Penydarren Park being host to the first touring Australian rugby league side where they faced a Wales XIII in front of a crowd of 6,000.

== Football years ==
A housing estate next to it also carries the name of the stadium. It was also the home of the town's former club, Merthyr Tydfil F.C. There are plans for Merthyr to move to a new stadium on the edge of the town. The stadium would be part of the new 'Merthyr Village' development and have a capacity of around 12,000. These plans were thrown into doubt by the Welsh Government's rejection of the project in 2007.

In July 2011, the newly promoted Merthyr Town FC hosted Welsh Premier League side Llanelli in a pre-season friendly at Penydarren Park, and thereafter took up full-time residency.

== Greyhound racing ==
Greyhound racing took place around the pitch at Penydarren Park from 1930 to 1960 on Thursday and Saturday evenings at 7.15pm and was a popular flapping track (unaffiliated to a governing body). It is listed in the 1947 betting licensing lists as having a capacity of 20,000 It is believed that Rudolf Hess attended race meetings here whilst a prisoner of war.

== Bibliography ==
- Leeworthy, Daryl (2012). Field of Play: The Sporting Heritage of Wales. Aberystwyth: Royal Commission on the Ancient and Historical Monuments of Wales. ISBN 978-1-87118-445-7.
