= 2011 New Zealand rugby league season =

Seasons
- 2010 2012

The 2011 New Zealand rugby league season was the 104th season of rugby league that had been played in New Zealand. The main feature of the year was the National Competition run by the New Zealand Rugby League. The premier teams competed for the Albert Baskerville Trophy, which was won by the Auckland Pride when they defeated the South Island Scorpions 44 - 34 in the Grand Final.

== International competitions ==
The New Zealand national rugby league team were going to host the ANZAC Test for the first time since 1998, as the match was originally announced to be played in Christchurch's AMI Stadium on 6 May. However, following the February 2011 Christchurch earthquake this decision was reviewed and on 4 March it was announced the match would be played at the Skilled Park on the Gold Coast. New Zealand lost the match 10–20. New Zealand were coached by Stephen Kearney and included Lance Hohaia, debutant Matt Duffie, Simon Mannering, Shaun Kenny-Dowall, Jason Nightingale, captain Benji Marshall, Kieran Foran, Steve Rapira, Nathan Fien, Sam McKendry, Adam Blair, Bronson Harrison, Jeremy Smith, Isaac Luke, Ben Matulino, Fuifui Moimoi and debutant Lewis Brown. Greg Eastwood and Gerard Beale were in the squad as 18th and 19th man respectively.

The Kiwis were to play a Test match against the Cook Islands in Rarotonga on 7 October, however this was later called off due to the unavailability of 29 players.

The Kiwis lost to Australia 42–6 on 16 October in Newcastle before heading to England to compete in the Four Nations tournament in October and November. The Kiwis lost to Australia 12–26, bet Wales 36–0 before losing to England 6–28 to end their Four Nations campaign. The squad for these Test matches was Gerard Beale, Alex Glenn, Jeremy Smith, Kieran Foran, Kalifa Faifai Loa, Bill Tupou, Adam Blair, Sika Manu, Kevin Proctor, Lewis Brown, Kevin Locke, Simon Mannering, Ben Matulino, Russell Packer, Elijah Taylor, Fuifui Moimoi, Sam McKendry, Jason Nightingale, Nathan Fien, Issac Luke, Jared Waerea-Hargreaves, Benji Marshall (c) and Thomas Leuluai. Steve Matai, Shaun Johnson, Krisnan Inu and Manu Vatuvei were originally selected but withdrew from the squad. New Zealand lost their first Four Nations match 26–12 to Australia.

In response to the February 2011 Christchurch earthquake a Legends of League charity match was organised at Mount Smart Stadium on 10 March. The teams were, New Zealand: Richie Barnett, Sean Hoppe, David Kidwell, Ruben Wiki (C), Sam Panapa, Olsen Filipaina, Stacey Jones, Joe Vagana, Monty Betham, Jerry Seuseu, Kurt Sorensen, Tawera Nikau and Hugh McGahan. Bench: Gary Freeman, Duane Mann, Paul Rauhihi, Logan Swann, Dean Affleck (TradeMe winner), Quentin Pongia, Awen Guttenbeil, Dean Bell and Francis Leota. Australia: David Peachey, Hazem El Masri, David Myles, Tea Ropati, Nathan Blacklock, Scott Hill, Clayton Friend, Mark Horo, Ben Elias (C), Craig Smith, Paul Langmack, John Hopoate, Kevin Campion. Bench: Jason Death, James Goulding, Bruce McGuire, Mark Bosnich, Billy Peden, John Cornwell (TradeMe winner), Jason Williams and Alex Chan. New Zealand won 32–22 and the match raised over $100,000.

Auckland won the Women's National Tournament. The Kiwi Ferns will play a Test against Australia on 15 October in the Gold Coast.

The New Zealand Residents played a match against the New Zealand Māori Residents on 30 October, winning 32–22. The Residents team was coached by Brent Stuart, assisted by Brent Gemmell and included Philip Pese (Auckland), Junior Salevao (South Island), Ruben Williams (Waicoa Bay), Bruce Havea (South Island), Peta Hiku (Counties Manukau), Matt Everitt (Wellington), Hayden Karena (Waicoa Bay), Jaye Pukepuke (South Island), Darren Kingi (Counties Manukau), Soape Kavaliku (Auckland), Suaia Matagi (Auckland), James Baxendale (South Island), Manu Mau (Auckland). Interchange: Kyle Leka (South Island), Dwayne Waterman (Wellington), William Heta (Counties Manukau), Manu Weepu (South Island). Reserve: Richard Graham (Mid Central). The New Zealand Māori Residents included Api Pewhairangi, Rusty Bristow and Jeremiah Pai.

The Junior Kiwis defeated the Junior Kangaroos 28–16 in a one off test match as a curtain raiser to the Newcastle Test match. The squad was coached by David Kidwell and included Kenneath Bromwich and Tohu Harris (Melbourne Storm), Sosaia Feki, Siliva Havili, Omar Slaimankhel, Sio Siua Taukeiaho, Carlos Tuimavave, Adam Henry, Sebastine Ikahihifo, Samiuela Lousi, Agnatius Paasi and John Palavi (Warriors), Ben Murdoch-Masila (Wests Tigers), Josh Papalii (Canberra Raiders), Andrew Pelasio (Penrith Panthers), Michael Parker-Walshe, Jason Taumalolo and Wayne Ulugia (North Queensland Cowboys).

The Under-18 New Zealand side played two matches against the Australian Schoolboys in New Zealand. They won the first match 28–26 before losing the second 16–40. The New Zealand Under-16 side drew a match against a Queensland Academy of Sport team 14-all. Queensland Academy of Sport earlier played New Zealand Māori under-16's side.

Benji Marshall won the New Zealand Rugby League's Kiwi Player of the Year award while Shaun Johnson won the Kiwi Rookie of the Year award. Jason Taumalolo was the Junior Player of the Year while Matt Everitt (Wellington) was the Domestic Player of the Year, Akenehe Pereira (Wellington) was the Women's Player of the Year and Henry Perenara was the Match Official of the Year. The Porirua Vikings were the Grassroots Club of the Year. Benji Marshall won Rugby League International Federation's Standoff of the Year award.

At its annual general meeting the New Zealand Rugby League appointed Sir Peter Leitch as Patron, replacing Helen Clark. Trevor Maxwell was reappointed President of the NZRL for a further two years while Meng Foon was elected as an elected Director for the next three years. NZRL Chairman Scott Carter was appointed the Rugby League International Federation's chairman in June - the first New Zealander to hold the position. On 31 May NZRL Director Mark Gosche was elected the Chairperson of the Asia-Pacific Rugby League Confederation.

== National competitions ==
=== Rugby League Cup ===
The Rugby League Cup is currently held by Canterbury, who did not defend it in 2010.

=== National Competition ===
2011 was the second year of the National Competition. Auckland zone were the defending champions. Under 17 and Under 15 competitions were again held alongside the senior competition. Auckland, Counties Manukau and the South Island adopted new nicknames in 2011 while the Heartland side renamed itself the Central Vipers.

Auckland was coached by Brent Gemmell, who was assisted by Ken McIntosh. The team included Malo Solomona, Kitiona Pasene, Sala Fa'alogo and Jeremiah Pai. The Counties Manukau Stingrays were coached by Rusty Matua and included Anthony Gelling, Roman Hifo and Rusty Bristow. Brent Stuart coached the South Island Scorpions. Mike Culley and Mike Dorreen coached the Under-17 side while Tom Ball and Jeff Whittaker again guided the South Island 15s. They held a trial match on 21 August.

Auckland Pride won all three grades.

==== Season standings ====
Team	Pld	W	D	L	B	PF	PA	Pts
Auckland Pride	6	5	0	1	1	230	130	12
South Island Scorpions	6	4	0	2	1	218	112	10
Counties Manukau Stingrays	6	4	0	2	1	196	134	10
Wellington Orcas	6	3	0	3	1	152	162	8
Central Vipers	6	3	0	3	1	124	170	8
Waicoa Bay Stallions	6	2	0	4	1	180	156	6
Northern Swords	6	0	0	6	1	82	318	2

==== Schedule ====
===== Round 1 =====
Home	Score	Away	Match Information
Home	Score	Away	Date	Venue
South Island Scorpions	20-32	Wellington Orcas	28 August	Denton Park, Hornby
Central Vipers	30-16	Counties Manukau Stingrays	28 August	Farndon Park, Clive
Northern Swords	18-82	Auckland Pride	28 August	Arnold Rae Park, Kaitaia

- Bye: Waicoa Bay Stallions

===== Round 2 =====
Home	Score	Away	Match Information
Home	Score	Away	Date	Venue
South Island Scorpions	82-0	Northern Swords	4 September	Denton Park, Hornby
Waicoa Bay Stallions	16-52	Counties Manukau Stingrays	3 September	Blake Park, Tauranga
Wellington Orcas	38-18	Central Vipers	4 September	Fraser Park, Wellington

- Bye: Auckland Pride

===== Round 3 =====
Home	Score	Away	Match Information
Home	Score	Away	Date	Venue
Auckland Pride	34-10	Central Vipers	11 September	Cornwall Park, Auckland
Waicoa Bay Stallions	22-24	South Island Scorpions	11 September	Davies Park, Huntly
Northern Swords	20-42	Wellington Orcas	11 September	Lindvart Park, Kaikohe

- Bye: Counties-Manukau Stingrays

===== Round 4 =====
Home	Score	Away	Match Information
Home	Score	Away	Date	Venue
Counties Manukau Stingrays	48-24	Northern Swords	18 September	Bruce Pulman Park, Papakura
Wellington Orcas	20-34	Auckland Pride	18 September	Fraser Park, Wellington
Central Vipers	32-28	Waicoa Bay Stallions	18 September	Johnston Park, Feilding

Bye: South Island Scorpions

===== Round 5 =====
The Scorpions dedicated their win over Auckland to Blair Sims, a Scorpions player who died in the Pike River Mine disaster.

Home	Score	Away	Match Information
Home	Score	Away	Date	Venue
Wellington Orcas	18-30	Counties Manukau Stingrays	24 September	Fraser Park, Wellington
Northern Swords	4-40	Waicoa Bay Stallions	25 September	Simson Park, Moerewa
South Island Scorpions	30-20	Auckland Pride	25 September	Wingham Park, Greymouth

Bye: Central Vipers

===== Round 6 =====
Home	Score	Away	Match Information
Home	Score	Away	Date	Venue
Counties Manukau Stingrays	20-22	Auckland Pride	2 October	Bruce Pulman Park, Papakura
Waicoa Bays Stallions	42-4	Wellington Orcas	2 October	Puketawhero Park, Rotorua
Central Vipers	10-38	South Island Scorpions	2 October	Tikorangi Sports Ground, Waitara

Bye: Northern Swords

===== Round 7 =====
If the South Island Scorpions had defeated the Counties Manukau Stingrays they would have hosted the final. If Counties Manukau had won by over 50 points they would have made the final instead of the South Island.

Home	Score	Away	Match Information
Home	Score	Away	Date	Venue
Auckland Pride	40-32	Waicoa Bay Stallions	8 October	Bruce Pulman Park, Papakura
Counties Manukau Stingrays	30-24	South Island Scorpions	9 October	Bruce Pulman Park, Papakura
Northern Swords	16-24	Central Vipers	9 October	Toll Stadium, Whangarei

Bye: Wellington Orcas

===== Final =====
The final was refereed by Shane Rehm and Auckland led 20–10 at halftime. Auckland's Suaia Matagi was named man of the match.

Home	Score	Away	Match Information
Home	Score	Away	Date	Venue
Auckland Pride	44-34	South Island Scorpions	15 October	Massey Park, Papakura

=== Upper Central Zone ===
Waikato defeated Coastline 32–0 on 23 April. Coastline then lost to the Bay of Plenty 20–14 on 4 June in Tauranga. Waikato then defeated Bay of Plenty 44–12 at Puketawhero Park in Rotorua on 2 July to win the tri-series.

=== South Island Zone competition ===
A home and away series was held between Canterbury A, Canterbury under-20s, Tasman Titans, the West Coast Chargers, Otago Whalers and Southland Rams.

Tasmna, who were coached by Phil Bergman, defeated the West Coast 28–20 in the first round while the Otago Whalers defeated the Southland Rams 36–28.

The competition was played between 27 August and 24 September. Canterbury A, who were coached by Shane Endacott, defeated Canterbury 20s in the final played at Halswell Domain on 2 October.

=== National Secondary Schools competition ===
Sixteen schools competed in the Secondary School National tournament at Bruce Pulman Park in Papakura between 22 and 26 August. Otahuhu College defeated defending champions St. Paul's College 26–22 in the grand final which required extra time after being 22-all at full-time. Viliami Lolohea from Otahuhu won the Manukau Institute of Technology Most Valuable Player of the Tournament award.

The tournament team was; Roger Sheck (Otahuhu College), Fine Faingaa (Aorere College), Vili Iloahefaiva (Otahuhu College), Viliami Lolohea (Otahuhu College), Pharaoh Tumupu (St Paul's College), Axl Kingi (Tokoroa High School), Kauri Aupouri-Puketapu (Wainuiomata High School), Samuel Lisone (Tangaroa College), Matthew Halalilo (Southern Cross College), Vincent Afoa (Otahuhu College), Miro Atera (Tangaroa College), Sione Feao (Otahuhu College), Tala Mamea (Southern Cross College), Christopher Satae (St Paul's College), Metia Lisati (Mt Roskill Grammar), Tyler Tane (Wainuiomata College) and Matthew Shortland (Papakura High School). The coach of the tournament was Tama Teaukura from Tokoroa High School.

The other participating schools included Wainuiomata High School, Taita College, St Johns College (Tokoroa), Hamilton's Fraser High School, Mount Albert Grammar School, Kelston Boys' High School, Mount Roskill Grammar School, Aorere College, Southern Cross College, Tangaroa College, Manurewa High School, Papakura High School and Aranui High School.

== Australian competitions ==
The New Zealand Warriors spent their 17th first grade season in Australian competition, playing in the National Rugby League. They made the 2011 NRL Grand Final, losing to the Manly-Warringah Sea Eagles 24–10. 692,000 New Zealanders watched the Grand Final on either live on Sky Network Television or delayed on Prime.

The Junior Warriors again competed in the Toyota Cup, defending their title, while the Auckland Vulcans played in the NSW Cup, making the grand final and losing to the Canterbury-Bankstown Bulldogs. The Auckland Vulcans were coached by former New Zealand international, Richie Blackmore.

== Club competitions ==
=== Auckland ===
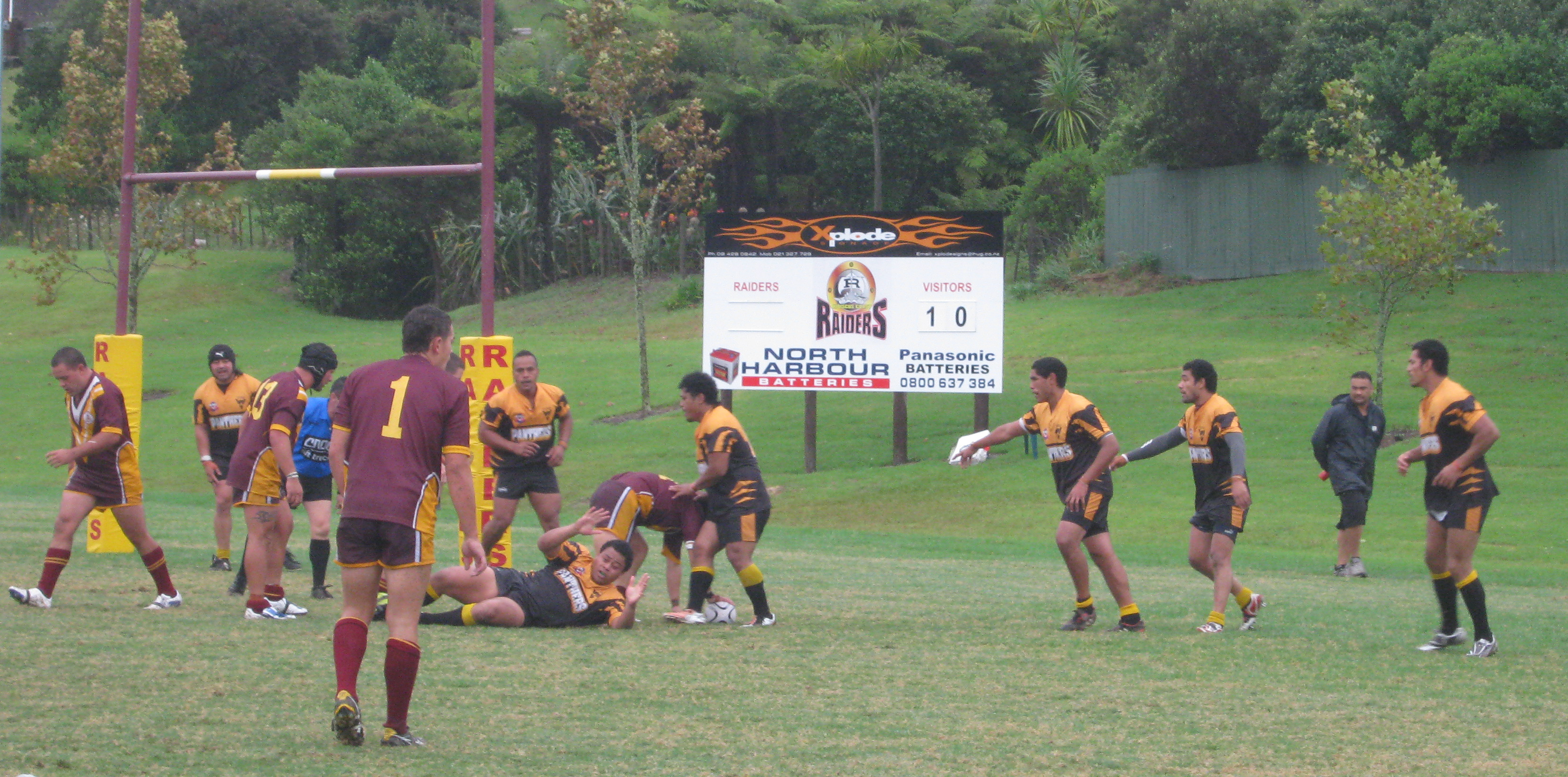
The Hibiscus Coast Raiders play the Papatoetoe Panthers in Phelan Shield action

In their 50th year, the Howick Hornets won the Fox Memorial Trophy and the Rukutai Shield as minor premiers. They defeated the Otahuhu Leopards 24–14 in the Grand Final. The Glenora Bears won the Stormont Shield while Mount Albert won the Kiwi Shield.

Mount Albert, Otahuhu, Glenora, Howick, Manurewa, Papakura, Marist and Northcote qualified for the 2011 and 2012 Fox Memorials. 2012 will not feature a grading round.

The Bay Roskill Vikings and Point Chevalier Pirates made the Sharman Shield Grand Final, with Point Chevalier winning 24–16. Both teams qualified for the 2012 Fox Memorial. Te Atatu, Otara, Mangere East, Richmond, Manukau and East Coast Bays also competed in the Sharman Shield.

The New Lynn Stags defeated the Papatoetoe Panthers 32–30 in the Phelan Shield Grand Final. Nine players from the Mount Wellington Warriors club were suspended, including two for five years each, after a fight in a Phelan Shield match against the Glenfield Greyhounds.

Jeremiah Pai (Northcote) won the Player of the Year award, David Bhana (Northcote) won the Rookie of the Year award, Tasha Tapu (Richmond) won the Women's Player of the Year award, Lee Wetherill (Howick) won the coach of the year award, William Stowers (Papakura) won the Lance Painter Rose Bowl as the top goal kicker, Rusty Bristow (Papakura) won the Masters of Rugby League trophy for the top try scorer, Daniel Mauafu (Navy/North Shore) was the Phelan Shield player of the year and Trent Bishop (Otara) was the Sharman Cup player of the year. Craig Pascoe won the John Percival Memorial Trophy as referee of the year. The Team of the Year was; Peta Hiku (Manurewa), Karl Hill (Howick), Rusty Bristow (Papakura), Jeremiah Pai (Northcote), Aaron Booth (Glenora), Kyle Bos (Otahuhu), Tony Tuia (Howick), Suaia Matagi (Mount Albert), Manu Mau (Marist). Tony Tuia (Howick) won the Doug Price Medal as Player of the Grand Final.

- The Mangere East Hawks were co-coached by James Leuluai and Gavin Patuki.
- The Manukau Magpies celebrated their 100th year in 2011.
- The Te Atatu Roosters were coached by Bernie Perenara and included Jason Williams and Ralph and Thomas Ah Van. Williams later transferred to the Glenora Bears.
- The East Coast Bays Barracudas were coached by Willie Swann.
- The Mount Albert Lions were coached by player-coach Steve Buckingham and included Sala Fa'alogo, Ukuma Ta'ai and Matthew Sturm.
- The Papakura Sea Eagles were coached by Gary Kemble and included Toshio Laiseni.
- The Howick Hornets included Anthony Gelling and were coached by player Lee Wetherill, who also won player of the year at the Auckland Rugby League prizegiving.
- The Point Chevalier Pirates included Misi Taulapapa and Wairangi Koopu. Stacey Jones and Awen Guttenbeil are involved in the coaching team.
- The Bay Roskill Vikings were coached by Duane Mann and included Willie Wolfgramm.
- The Ellerslie Eagles included David Fisiiahi.
- The Manurewa Marlins included Pita Godinet and Gus Maileatoa Brown.
- The Glenora Bears included Malo Solomona.
- The New Lynn Stags included John Arthur Williams, the brother of Sonny Bill Williams.
- The Hibiscus Coast Raiders included Shaun Ata.

In addition to Manukau, the Otahuhu Leopards also celebrated their centenary during the season.

Otahuhu College won the Auckland Secondary Schools competition and the Counties Manukau Zone Dean Bell Shield. They defeated the Auckland Zone Nigel Vagana Shield winning Mount Albert Grammar School 22–2 to win the 1st XIII University Shield. Tamaki College won the Girls Premier First XIII Grand Final, St Pauls College won the under-85 kg Jack Fagan Cup and Aorere College won the under 15, 9-a-side Graham Lowe Cup.

=== Wellington ===
The Te Aroha Eels and Porirua Vikings met in the Wellington Rugby League's grand final on 13 August at Fraser Park. The Eels won the title, defeating the Vikings by one point 23–22.

The Porirua Vikings were coached by David Lomax.

The Upper Hutt Tigers celebrated their 50th season.

=== Canterbury ===
Minor premiers the Halswell Hornets played the Celebration Lions in the Canterbury Rugby League grand final at Denton Oval on 14 August. The match was refereed by Glen Black. The grand final was the first in the event's 44-year history that was not played at Rugby League Park.

Following the February 2011 Christchurch earthquake, the Canterbury Rugby League cancelled the pre-season competition. Rugby League Park was damaged during the earthquake and is currently closed. Halswell won the Tavendale Cup as winners of the first round.

- Halswell were coached by Shane Endacott. The side included Joe Pombo.
- Hornby were coached by player-coach Corey Lawrie.
- The Papanui Tigers were coached by Brent Stuart.

The Timaru Warriors competed in the CRL second division.

=== Other competitions ===
The Hamilton City Tigers defeated the Taniwharau Rugby League Club in the Waicoa Bay final, a replay of last years Waikato Rugby League final. The Tigers defeated the Otumoetai Eels 40–8 while Taniwharau won their semifinal 15–4 over the Ngaruawahia Panthers. Taniwharau were coached by Herewini Rangi. Other teams in the competition include the Hamilton Hornets, Taupo Phoenix, Pikiao, Pacific, Central, College Old Boys, Turangawaewae, the Tauranga Whalers and the Ngongotaha Chiefs. Ngaruawahia, who celebrated their centenary in Labour weekend, after being founded in 1911, won the Waikato Rugby League's premiership, defeating the Hamilton City Tigers 30–8 in the grand final. David Peachey played for the Taupo Phoenix while organising the Cronulla Sharks NRL match in Taupo. The Tauranga Whalers defeated the Pacific Sharks 24–18 in extra time to win the Bay of Plenty Rugby League championship.

The Waitara Bears, Fielding Falcons, Bell Block Marist Dragons and Kia Ora Warriors all made the Western Alliance final series. The final was held on 30 July and won by the Dragonas who defeated the Fielding Falcons 33–32. The Dragons also won the Taranaki Rugby League's Lile Shield. During the year the Marist Dragons held a fundraiser for their sister Marist club in Canterbury. The Hawera Hawks refused to play on the South Taranaki District Council's Hub ground due to the state of the ground. Other teams included the Dannevirke Tigers, Western Suburbs Tigers, Linton Cobras and the Normanby/Okaiawa Knights. The Hawke's Bay Rugby League celebrated its centenary in August.

Tasman Rugby League was to host a Nines competition at Nelson's Trafalgar Park in April. However, following the Christchurch earthquake, a number of Canterbury and West Coast teams withdrew and the event was postponed until March 2012. Six teams competed in the Tasman Rugby League competition which held its Grand Final on 20 August. The Stoke Cobras qualified for the Grand Final.

The Southland Rugby League was refused use of Rugby Park Stadium by the Southland Rugby Football Union. Southland Rugby League had proposed to hold their club final there on 19 June. The competition was won by the Lone Star Cowboys, who defeated the Wakatipu Giants 34–20 in the final at George Oval. The Kia Toa Tigers defeated the South Pacific Raiders 34–14 to win the Otago Rugby League's Winter final. The South Pacific Raiders then defeated Wakatipu He Tauaa 50–26 in Queenstown to win the combined Southland-Otago competition.
