= 2012 New Zealand rugby league season =

Seasons
- 2011 2013

The 2012 New Zealand rugby league season was the 105th season of rugby league that was played in New Zealand. The main feature of the year was the National Competition run by the New Zealand Rugby League.

== International competitions ==
The New Zealand national rugby league team lost the ANZAC Test to Australia 12-20. The match was held at Eden Park on 20 April. It was the first time the match has been played in New Zealand since 1998. The 2011 test was originally scheduled to be in New Zealand but it was moved to the Gold Coast following the February 2011 Christchurch earthquake. Previously Forsyth Barr Stadium had been mentioned as a possible venue for the test before the announcement of Eden Park. New Zealand were coached by Stephen Kearney and included Josh Hoffman, Jason Nightingale, Shaun Kenny-Dowall, Simon Mannering, Manu Vatuvei, Benji Marshall (c), Shaun Johnson, Ben Matulino, Issac Luke, Sam McKendry, Adam Blair, Frank Pritchard, Jeremy Smith. Reserves: Nathan Fien, Jared Waerea-Hargreaves, Jesse Bromwich, Alex Glenn. Non-playing reserves were Gerard Beale and Jason Taumalolo.

New Zealand also played an end of year test match against Australia at Dairy Farmers Stadium on 13 October, losing 10-18. The team for the match was Josh Hoffman, Sam Perrett, Dean Whare, Krisnan Inu, Gerard Beale, Benji Marshall (c), Kieran Foran, Sam Kasiano, Issac Luke, Jesse Bromwich, Simon Mannering, Frank Pritchard and Greg Eastwood. Bench: Ben Matulino, Sam McKendry, Kevin Proctor and Elijah Taylor. Reserve: Shaun Johnson.

The Junior Kiwis lost to the Junior Kangaroos 16-48 in the curtain raiser to the October test match. The Junior Kiwis were coached by John Ackland, who replaced David Kidwell after Kidwell stepped down due to family reasons. The selectors for the match were Ackland, Kidwell, Mark Horo and David Lomax. The team for the match was Roger Tuivasa-Sheck, Wayne Ulugia, Curtis Rona, Ngataua Hukatai, David Fusitua, Carlos Tuimavave (c), Penani Manumalealii, Mosese Fotuaika, Siliva Havili, Jesse Sue, Jason Taumalolo (c), Tohu Harris, David Bhana. Bench: Api Pewhairangi, Tupou Sopoaga, Peta Hiku and Toka Likiliki. Reserve: Jeremy Hawkins.

Brent Gemmell coached the New Zealand Residents. The team defeated a New Zealand Māori Residents side, 36-24.

Convener of selectors Howie Tamati stood down during the year due to time commitments and was replaced by 2011 Junior Kiwis selector Richie Barnett. Chairman Scott Carter was reappointed for another three-year term while independent director Mark Gosche decided not to reapply and was instead replaced by Iva Ropati. In August, NZRL CEO Jim Doyle announced he would leave the League at the end of the year.

Shaun Johnson was named the Rugby League International Federation's International Rookie of the Year.

The New Zealand Rugby League named three more Legends of League as part of the Wellington Rugby League's centenary celebrations. They were Stephen Kearney, Colin O'Neil and John Whittaker.

Jeremy Smith won the Steve Watene Memorial Trophy as the 2012 New Zealand Player of the Year. Ben Henry was named the Kiwi Rookie of the Year, while Roger Tuivasa-Sheck took out the award for New Zealand Junior Player of the Year. Shane Rehm was awarded the Match Official of the Year.

== National competitions ==
=== Rugby League Cup ===
Auckland defeated Canterbury 44-16 on 4 June at Christchurch Stadium, the upgraded Rugby League Park, to win the Rugby League Cup, which had not been defended by Canterbury since claiming it in 2009. The halftime score was 18-6.

Auckland then defeated Wellington on 21 October 2012, 56-12. The match was held as part of the Wellington Rugby League's centenary celebrations. Matt Sturm played in this match, he had last represented Auckland in 1996.

=== National Competition ===
2012 was the third year of the National Competition. Following a deal with the SKY TV, each week had one game played at Mount Smart Stadium and broadcast live on Monday Night.

- The Auckland Pride were renamed the Akarana Falcons.
- The Counties Manukau Stingrays train on squad included Eliakimi Uasi, Roman Hifo, Sonny Bristow, Toshio Laiseni and Zebastian Luisi. The team was selected by Peter Cacciopolli, James Leuluai and James Pirimona.
- Wellington was coached by David Lomax.
- The South Island appointed Mike Dorreen as head coach.

==== Season standings ====
Team	Pld	W	D	L	B	PF	PA	Pts
Counties Manukau Stingrays	6	6	0	0	1	290	82	14
Akarana Falcons	6	5	0	1	1	272	66	12
South Island Scorpions	6	3	0	3	1	247	108	8
Waicoa Bay Stallions	6	3	0	3	1	160	201	8
Wellington Orcas	6	3	0	3	1	148	192	8
Central Vipers	6	1	0	5	1	94	256	4
Northern Swords	6	0	0	6	1	44	350	2

==== Final ====
Home	Score	Away	Match Information
Home	Score	Away	Date	Venue
Counties Manukau Stingrays	20 - 38	Akarana Falcons	15 October	Mount Smart Stadium, Auckland

=== South Island Inter-District competition ===
A home and away series was held between Canterbury, Tasman Titans, the West Coast Chargers, Otago Whalers and the Southland Rams.

Canterbury, who were coached by Shane Endacott, defaulted round 5 against Southland due to injuries and call ups to the South Island Scorpions. The South Island Zone decided to subsequently exclude them from the rest of the tournament.

The Tasman Titans, who were coached by Phil Bergman, won the competition, defeating the Southland Rams 26-24 in the final.

=== National Secondary Schools ===
Twenty four schools competed in the National Secondary Schools Tournament, eight more than 2011. Auckland champions St Paul's College defeated last years winner, Otahuhu College 24-4 in the final. Auckland Grammar School won the developing schools division, defeating Papakura High School 14-12.

== Australian competitions ==
The New Zealand Warriors spent their 18th first grade season in Australian competition, playing in the National Rugby League. The Warriors finished 14th and coach Brian McClennan was sacked with two games remaining in the season.

The Junior Warriors again competed in the Toyota Cup, while the Auckland Vulcans competed in the NSW Cup.

== Club competitions ==
=== Auckland ===
The Mount Albert Lions won the Fox Memorial and Rukutai Shield. In the grand final they defeated the Glenora Bears 58-10. The Otahuhu Leopards won the Stormont Shield and the Mount Albert Lions won the Kiwi Shield. The Mangere East Hawks won the second division Sharman Cup while the Hibiscus Coast Raiders won the third division Phelan Shield. The Howick Hornets ended the season holding the challenge Roope Rooster. The Fox Memorial and Sharman Cup competitions started on 31 March with grand finals being held on 18 August.

The Fox Memorial Trophy was played under a new format with no grading round. The Howick Hornets, Manurewa Marlins, Point Chevalier Pirates, Northcote Tigers, Mount Albert Lions, Glenora Bears, Papakura Sea Eagles, Marist Saints, Bay Roskill Vikings and Otahuhu Leopards competed.

The Pirates finished the season third. However, in their final match against the Marist Saints, the Pirates fielded a third-string side and lost 0-102. The result denied Papakura a place in the semi-finals, where they would have played the Pirates the following week. Papakura had beaten the Pirates on both occasions the teams had met earlier in the year and appealed to the Auckland Rugby League. The Pirates were charged with bringing discredit on the game and were subsequently ejected from the play-offs.

Ellerslie celebrated their centenary during Queen's Birthday Weekend. Cyril Eastlake was named the club's Player of the Century.

Simon Ieremia (Marist) won the Lance Painter Rose Bowl as Top Goal Kicker of the Year, Aaron Kesha was the John Percival Referee of the Year, Buck Hall (Hibiscus Coast) was the Phelan Shield player of the year, Stedman Lefau (Mangere East) was the Sharman Cup player of the year and Brendan Douglas (Glenora) was the Coach of the Year. Ralph Ah Van (Mt Albert) won the Fox Memorial Lion Red Player of the Year award.

St. Paul's College won the 1st XIII University Shield, the under 85 kg Jack Fagan Cup and the Under 15, 9 a side Graham Lowe Cup.

=== Wellington ===
The Randwick Kingfishers won the Wellington Rugby League Grand Final, defeating the Wainuiomata Lions 34-8.

The Petone Panthers celebrated their centenary. All three of the clubs living past New Zealand national rugby league team attended; Kevin Tamati, Nolan Tupaea and Peter Mellars. The club also named its team of the century; Albert House, Mark Brandon, Roy Siddells, Edmund (Hone) Tyne, Roy Proebstel, Nolan Tupaea, James Barber, Hercules (Bumper) Wright, John Hona, Kevin Tamati, Thomas William (Angry) Cross, Conrad Byrne and Chappy Pine.

=== Canterbury ===
The Hornby Panthers won the Grand Final, defeating the Haswell Hornets, the minor premiers, 19-18. Corey Lawrie scored the winning drop goal for Hornby. The Celebration Lions defeated the Northern Bulldogs 26-12 to win the Gore Cup.

The Canterbury Rugby League celebrated their centenary.

The Celebration Lions won the pre-season tournament, defeating the Halswell Hornets: 20-12 in the final.

=== Northland ===
The Hikurangi Stags won the Whangarei City & Districts title, by defeating the Moerewa Tigers 32-18 at Toll Stadium, Whangārei.

=== Other competitions ===
The Hamilton City Tigers won the Waikato Rugby League competition when they defeated Taniwharau 32-4 in the grand final on 26 May. They also won the Waicoa Bay club competition, defeating the Ngaruawahia Panthers 26-12. The Seeka Falcons won the Gisborne competition, defeating the defending champions, the Paikea Whalers 22-18 in the final.

The Waitara Bears were fined $400 and deducted four points for playing an underage player in four games in the Western Alliance competition.

Tamatea won the Hawke's Bay Rugby League competition, defeating Outkast Sports 28-18. Linton Cobras won the Manawatu Rugby League grand final 43-22 over the Dannevirke Tigers. The Dannevirke Tigers won the Western Alliance final, defeating Taranaki's Bell Block Dragons in the final.

The inaugural Nelson Nines competition, which was postponed from 2011 due to the 2011 Christchurch earthquake, was staged on 10 March. The competition involved five teams from Nelson, and one each from Marlborough, Christchurch and Wellington. The tournament was won by Christchurch's Aranui Eagles, who defeated Wellington's Toa 20-6 in the final.

The West Coast Rugby League competition was won by the Runanga Seagulls for the third consecutive year. They defeated Suburbs 48-12.

The Richmond Rabbits defeated the Stoke Cobras 19-16 to win the Tasman Rugby League Grand Final at Trafalgar Park, Nelson. The Kia Toa Tigers defeated the South Pacific Raiders 34-14 to win the Otago Rugby League. The Southland Rugby League competition was won by Cooks 27-26 over He Tauaa.
