= 2014 New Zealand rugby league season =

Seasons
- 2013 2015

The 2014 New Zealand rugby league season was the 107th season of rugby league that had been played in New Zealand. The main feature of the year was the National Competition run by the New Zealand Rugby League. The Albert Baskerville Trophy was won by the Canterbury Bulls.

The New Zealand national rugby league team competed in the 2014 ANZAC Test and co-hosted the end of year Four Nations tournament. The Kiwis won the final, defeating Australia 22–18.

== International competitions ==
The Kiwis co-hosted the Four Nations in October and November. They went through the tournament undefeated, defeating Australia 30–12 in Brisbane, Samoa 14–12 in Whangārei and England 16–14 in Dunedin before defeating Australia again 22–18 in the final in Wellington. It was the first time since 1998 that New Zealand had defeating Australia in consecutive test matches.

Coached by Stephen Kearney, the squad consisted of Gerard Beale, Adam Blair, Jesse Bromwich, Lewis Brown, Greg Eastwood, Sosaia Feki, Kieran Foran, Tohu Harris, Siliva Havili, Peta Hiku, Shaun Johnson, Shaun Kenny-Dowall, Thomas Leuluai, Issac Luke, Simon Mannering, Suaia Matagi, Bodene Thompson, Jason Nightingale, Kevin Proctor, Jason Taumalolo, Martin Taupau, Manu Vatuvei, Dallin Watene-Zelezniak and Dean Whare. Both Sam Moa and Dallin Watene-Zelezniak were originally selected but withdrew due to family issues and injury respectively. Manu Vatuvei passed Nigel Vagana as the Kiwis top try scorer, scoring his 19th and 20th test match tries in the Four Nations final.

The New Zealand national rugby league team played the annual ANZAC Test against Australia at Allianz Stadium on 2 May, losing 18–30. The team was coached by Stephen Kearney and included Peta Hiku, Roger Tuivasa-Sheck, Dean Whare, Gerard Beale, Jason Nightingale, Tohu Harris, Shaun Johnson, Jesse Bromwich, Ben Henry, Sam Moa, Simon Mannering (c), Kevin Proctor, Adam Blair and a bench of Siliva Havili, Martin Taupau, Greg Eastwood and Isaac John. Kenneath Bromwich was the 18th man.

The New Zealand Māori side toured Queensland to play two matches against the Murri Queensland Indigenous team. Coached by Darren Pirini, the squad consisted of Josh Ailoamai, Delane Ashby, Kenny Bromwich, Kenny Edwards, Willy Heta, Kurt Kara, Zebastian Luisi, Tyme Dow-Nikau, Rulon Nutira, Apirana Pewhairangi, Dan Pou-Tamou, Jaye Pukepuke, Gerico Cecil, Tyrone Studer, Brendon Tago, Zane Tetevano, Kainga Turner, Steve Waetford and Tama Koopu.

The Junior Kiwis defeated the Junior Kangaroos 15–14 on 18 October. The team was coached by Brent Gemmell and consisted of Kodi Nikorima, Chance Peni, Taane Milne, Sam Manulelua, Watson Heleta, Te Maire Martin, Zach Docker-Clay, Sam Lisone (c), Manaia Cherrington (c), Addin Fonua-Blake, Joseph Tapine, Nelson Asofa-Solomona, and Josh Ailoai. Bench: Danny Levi, Braden Uele, Lamar Liolevave and Adam Tuimavave-Gerard. The 18th man was Sione Katoa.

The New Zealand under-16s defeated Samoa under-16s 32–26 in Whangārei on 1 November. A South Island Selection beat NZ Universities & Tertiary Students 32–16 in Dunedin on 8 November. The Kiwi Ferns defeated the Australian Jillaroos 12–8 in Wollongong on 9 November.

== National competitions ==
=== Rugby League Cup ===
Auckland were the holders of the Rugby League Cup but have not defended the trophy since 2012.

=== National Competition ===
2014 is the fifth year of the National Competition.

- The Canterbury Bulls included Corey Lawrie.
- The Akarana Falcons were coached by Steve Buckingham and included Tangi Ropati.

==== Season standings ====
The Counties Manukau Stingrays and the Akarana Falcons were both disqualified after they fielded ineligible players during the regular season. Both sides fielded players who had played for the New Zealand Warriors in the NSW Cup and were therefore not registered as Auckland Rugby League players.

Team	Pld	W	D	L	B	PF	PA	Pts
Counties Manukau Stingrays	6	5	0	1	1	310	64	12*
Akarana Falcons	6	5	0	1	1	288	104	12*
Canterbury Bulls	6	5	0	1	1	256	130	12
Waicoa Bay Stallions	6	3	0	3	1	144	212	8
Central Vipers	6	2	0	4	1	148	210	6
Wellington Orcas	6	1	0	5	1	148	244	4
Northern Swords	6	0	0	6	1	64	394	2

==== Final ====
Home	Score	Away	Match Information
Home	Score	Away	Date	Venue
Canterbury Bulls	40 - 8	Waicoa Bay Stallions	18 October	Mount Smart Stadium, Auckland

=== Regional competitions ===
The South Island provincial rugby league competition involved the Southland Rams, Otago Whalers, Canterbury Development team, West Coast and Tasman. The competition was won by the Canterbury Development team.

== Australian competitions ==
The New Zealand Warriors spent their 20th first grade season in the Australian competition, playing in the National Rugby League. They finished ninth in the regular season, missing out on the finals due to for and against.

The Junior Warriors again competed in the Holden Cup, while the Warriors also competed in the NSW Cup for the first time, having taken over the Auckland Vulcans. The Junior Warriors won the Holden Cup, defeating the Brisbane Broncos 34–32 in the grand final. Both the Junior Warriors and the NSW Cup side had finished eighth in their regular seasons.

In February, Auckland hosted the 2014 NRL Auckland Nines tournament.

== Club competitions ==
=== Auckland ===
The Point Chevalier Pirates defeated the Mount Albert Lions 18–17 in double overtime to win the Fox Memorial grand final at the Trusts Stadium. The Pirates also won the Roope Rooster, Stormont Shield, Kiwi Shield and Rukutai Shield. The Otara Scorpions won the second division Sharman Cup, defeating the East Coast Bays Barracudas 22–16 in the final. Defending champions, the Mt Wellington Warriors, retained the third division Phelan Shield with a 37–14 win over the Pakuranga Jaguars.

The Howick Hornets' Dion Snell was named the Fox Memorial player of the year, Te Atatu's Sala Falelua won the Sharman Cup player of the year and the Pakuranga's Virgil Tangohau won the Phelan Shield player of the year award. Shane Rehm was the referee of the year, Cody Walker (Mount Albert) won the Rose Bowl goalkicker of the year, Jamal Hunt (Otahuhu) the rookie of the year and Grant Pocklington (Pt Chevalier) the coach of the year.

- The Mount Albert Lions are coached by Steve Buckingham.
- The Howick Hornets include player-coach Zebastian Luisi, Paul Fisiiahi and Eko Malu.
- The Otahuhu Leopards include Pakisonasi Afu.
- The Northcote Tigers are coached by Graeme Norton.
- The Marist Saints include Tangi Ropati.
- The Point Chevalier Pirates include Malo Solomona, Tevita Latu, Herman Retzlaff and Jeremiah Pai.
- The East Coast Bays Barracudas are coached by Ken McIntosh.
- The Papakura Sea Eagles include Eliakimi Uasi, Roman Hifo and are coached by Richie Blackmore.
- The Glenora Bears are co-coached by Boycie Nelson.

Kelston Boys' High School won the College premier cup, defeating St Paul's College 22–16 in the grand final.

=== Wellington ===
The Randwick Kingfishers won the Wellington Rugby League grand final.

=== Canterbury ===
In the Canterbury Rugby League grand final, the Halswell Hornets defeated the Celebration Lions 28–24 at Denton Park.

=== Waikato ===
Taniwharau defeated Otumoetai Tigers in the Waikato Rugby League championship final at Davies Park, Huntly.

=== Northland ===
Otangarei Knights won the Whangarei City & Districts Rugby league title, by defeating the Hikurangi Stags 28–26 at Toll Stadium, Whangārei.
