= 2020 New Zealand rugby league season =

Seasons
- ← 2019 2022 →

The 2020 New Zealand rugby league season was the 113th season of rugby league that had been played in New Zealand. The main feature of the year was the National Competition, run by the New Zealand Rugby League. The New Zealand Warriors were also competing in the 2020 NRL season.

== Men's national competitions ==
2020 was the 11th year of the national competition, which had a four team premiership, a four team North Island championship and a four team South Island championship.

=== NZRL Premiership ===
==== Ladder ====
Pos	Team	Pld	W	D	L	PF	PA	Pts
1	Akarana Falcons	3	2	1	0	150	22	5
2	Counties Stingrays	3	2	1	0	98	50	5
3	Canterbury Bulls	3	1	0	2	58	134	2
4	Waikato	3	0	0	3	50	150	0

==== Grand Final ====
Home	Score	Away	Match Information
Home	Score	Away	Date	Venue
Akarana Falcons	64–18	Counties Stingrays	31 October 2020, 4:05pm	Trusts Stadium

=== North Island Championship ===
==== Ladder ====
Pos	Team	Pld	W	D	L	PF	PA	Pts
1	Northern Swords	3	2	0	1	74	50	4
2	Upper Central Stallions	3	2	0	1	68	60	4
3	Wellington Orcas	3	1	0	2	66	72	2
4	Mid Central Vipers	3	1	0	2	56	82	2

=== South Island Championship ===
==== Ladder ====
Pos	Team	Pld	W	D	L	PF	PA	Pts
1	Otago Whalers	3	3	0	0	101	46	6
2	Aoraki	3	2	0	1	68	48	4
3	Southland	3	1	0	2	72	59	2
4	West Coast	3	0	0	3	22	92	0

=== North vs South ===
Home	Score	Away	Match Information
Home	Score	Away	Date	Venue
Northern Swords	22–20	Otago Whalers	31 October 2020, 12:05pm	Trusts Stadium

== Women's national competitions ==
=== NZRL Women's Premiership ===
==== Ladder ====
Pos	Team	Pld	W	D	L	PF	PA	Pts
1	Counties Stingrays	3	3	0	0	168	24	6
2	Akarana Falcons	3	2	0	1	120	54	4
3	Mid Central Vipers	3	1	0	2	48	128	2
4	Canterbury Bulls	3	0	0	3	24	154	0

==== Grand Final ====
Home	Score	Away	Match Information
Home	Score	Away	Date	Venue
Counties Stingrays	34–4	Akarana Falcons	31 October 2020, 2:05pm	Trusts Stadium

=== NZRL Women's Championship ===
==== Ladder ====
Pos	Team	Pld	W	D	L	PF	PA	Pts
1	Upper Central Stallions	3	3	0	0	82	34	6
2	Auckland Vulcans	3	2	0	1	84	40	4
3	Wellington Orcas	3	1	0	2	42	64	2
4	Northern Swords	3	0	0	3	30	100	0

==== Grand Final ====
Home	Score	Away	Match Information
Home	Score	Away	Date	Venue
Upper Central Stallions	12–10	Auckland Vulcans	31 October 2020, 10:00am	Trusts Stadium
