= 2013 New Zealand rugby league season =

Seasons
- 2012 2014

The 2013 New Zealand rugby league season was the 106th season of rugby league that had been played in New Zealand. The main feature of the year was the National Competition run by the New Zealand Rugby League. The competition was won by the Akarana Falcons, who defeated the Counties Manukau Stingrays 22-12 in the final.

The New Zealand national rugby league team competed in the 2013 ANZAC Test in addition to the end of year World Cup.

== International competitions ==
The New Zealand national rugby league team played the annual ANZAC Test against Australia at Canberra Stadium on 19 April, losing 12-32. The squad was Josh Hoffman, Sam Perrett, Shaun Kenny-Dowall, Dean Whare, Jason Nightingale, Kieran Foran (c), Shaun Johnson, Jesse Bromwich, Issac Luke, Jared Waerea-Hargreaves, Frank Pritchard, Kevin Proctor, Alex Glenn, Bench: Elijah Taylor, Sam McKendry, Ben Matulino, Tohu Harris. Captain Simon Mannering was ruled out on the day of the test, with Glenn replacing him in the starting side and Harris joining the bench. Roger Tuivasa-Sheck was the reserve.

At the end of the year the Kiwis participated in the 2013 World Cup, where they made it to the final and lost to Australia 2-34. The tournament was hosted in England, Wales, France and Ireland. The Kiwis played a warm up game against the Cook Islands side, winning 50-0. The match was not an official test match and featured a six-man bench and an unlimited interchange.

The New Zealand Māori side hosted the Murri Queensland Indigenous team. Coached by Darren Pirini, the squad consisted of Steve Wateford, Thyme Nikau, Rusty Bristow, Zebastian Luisi, Tee Mahe, Cody Walker, Jody Henry, Sam Rapira, Kurt Kara, Charlie Gubb, Bodene Thompson, Rulon Nutira, Scott Jones, Hamiora Mihaka, Tony Tuia, Jay Pukepuke and Kouma Samson.

The Junior Kiwis lost 26-38 to the Junior Kangaroos at WIN Jubilee Oval on 13 October 2013. The side included Kurtis Rowe, Dallin Watene-Zelezniak, Jeremy Hawkins, Ngani Laumape, David Fusitua, Tuimoala Lolohea, Mason Lino, Albert Vete, Manaia Cherrington, James Taylor, Raymond Faitala-Mariner, Joseph Tapine, David Bhana (c). Interchange: Mitch Clark, David Minute, Zach Docker-Clay, Takai Moeakiola.

The Kiwi Ferns competed in the Women's World Cup, losing the final for the first time. As part of the Festival of World Cups, New Zealand also sent a tertiary and defence force teams.

The NZRL's player of the year was Kieran Foran.

== National competitions ==
=== Rugby League Cup ===
Auckland were the current holders of the Rugby League Cup but did not defend the trophy during the season.

=== National Competition ===
2013 was the fourth year of the National Competition.

- The Akarana Falcons were coached by Steve Buckingham and included Tevita Latu and Malo Solomona.
- The South Island Scorpions were renamed the Canterbury Bulls. They continued to represent the entire South Island. The Bulls were coached by Mike Dorreen.
- The Counties Manukau Stingrays included Zebastian Luisi and Mataupu Poching.
- The Wellington Orcas were coached by Mike Kuiti.

==== Season standings ====
Team	Pld	W	D	L	B	PF	PA	Pts
Counties Manukau Stingrays	6	6	0	0	1	294	118	14
Akarana Falcons	6	5	0	1	1	266	88	12
Wellington Orcas	6	4	0	2	1	204	110	10
Waicoa Bay Stallions	6	3	0	3	1	184	204	8
Canterbury Bulls	6	2	0	4	1	212	168	6
Northern Swords	6	1	0	5	1	96	252	4
Central Vipers	6	0	0	6	1	64	380	2

==== Final ====
Home	Score	Away	Match Information
Home	Score	Away	Date	Venue
Counties Manukau Stingrays	12 - 22	Akarana Falcons	21 October	Mount Smart Stadium, Auckland

== Australian competitions ==
The New Zealand Warriors spent their 19th first grade season in the Australian competition, playing in the National Rugby League.

The Junior Warriors again competed in the Holden Cup, while the Auckland Vulcans competed in the NSW Cup.

== Club competitions ==
=== Auckland ===
The Auckland Rugby League competition began on 30 March and ended on 18 August when the Point Chevalier Pirates defeated the Mount Albert Lions 24-22 in the grand final. The Sharman Cup was won by the Richmond Rovers who defeated the Otara Scorpions 18-14 and the Mount Wellington Warriors defeated the Glenfield Greyhounds 39-10 to win the Phelan Shield.

Zebastian Luisi was named the player of the year, Point Chevalier's Matiu Love-Henry was the rookie of the year, Mount Albert's James Blackwell was the competition's top try-scorer and Mount Albert's Cody Walker won the Lance Painter Rose Bowl as top goal scorer.

- The Mount Albert Lions are coached by Steve Buckingham and include Matthew Sturm.
- The Howick Hornets include player-coach Zebastian Luisi.
- The Point Chevalier Pirates include Tevita Latu, Malo Solomona and Jeremiah Pai.
- The East Coast Bays Barracudas are coached by Ken McIntosh.
- The Richmond Bulldogs include Vae Kololo.
- The Papakura Sea Eagles include Eliakimi Uasi.

=== Wellington ===
The University Hunters defeated the Randwick Kingfishers 22-10 to win the Wellington Rugby League competition.

=== Canterbury ===
The Hornby Panthers won the Canterbury Rugby League grand final with a 22-20 win in overtime over Halswell. It was the first game of rugby league to be played at Christchurch's Rugby Park.

Addington, Sydenham and Linwood all celebrated their centenaries during the season.

=== Waikato ===
Taniwharau defeated Hamilton City Tigers 18-16 at Resthills Park, Hamilton.

=== Northland ===
The Hikurangi Stags won the Whangarei City & District rugby league title, by defeating the Takahiwai Warriors 36-26 at Toll Stadium, Whangārei.
