= 2023 New Zealand rugby league season =

NZRL National Competition 2023
- League: National Competition
- Teams: 12
- Premiers: Auckland Vulcans (1st title)
- Broadcast partners: Sky Sport

The 2023 New Zealand rugby league season was the 116th season of rugby league played in New Zealand. The main feature of the year was the National Competition, run by the New Zealand Rugby League.

== National Premiership ==
Select matches were broadcast live by Sky Sport.

=== Teams ===
Six teams contested the National Premiership, all in a single division round robin followed by a final.

Team	City/Region	Home Grounds
Akarana Falcons	Auckland	Mount Smart Stadium, Auckland Sunnynook Park, Auckland
Auckland Vulcans	Auckland	Cornwall Park, Auckland
Canterbury Bulls	Christchurch	Ngā Puna Wai Sports Hub, Christchurch
Counties Manukau Stingrays	South Auckland	Massey Park, South Auckland
Otago Whalers	Dunedin	Forsyth Barr Stadium, Dunedin
Waikato Mana	Hamilton	FMG Stadium Waikato, Hamilton

=== Regular season ===
==== Round 1 ====
Home	Score	Away	Date and time	Venue
Auckland Vulcans	48 – 22	Waikato	2 September 2023 12:00 noon	Cornwall Park
Canterbury Bulls	0 – 44	Counties Manukau	2 September 2023 2:00pm	Ngā Puna Wai Sports Hub
Otago Whalers	22 – 42	Akarana Falcons	3 September 2023 12:00pm	Forsyth Barr Stadium

==== Round 2 ====
Home	Score	Away	Date and time	Venue
Akarana Falcons	30 – 20	Waikato	9 September 2023 2:00pm	Sunnynook Park
Counties Manukau	36 – 20	Otago Whalers	10 September 2023 12:00pm	Massey Park
Canterbury Bulls	8 – 56	Auckland Vulcans	10 September 2023 2:00pm	Ngā Puna Wai Sports Hub

==== Round 3 ====
Home	Score	Away	Date and time	Venue
Auckland Vulcans	22 – 20	Akarana Falcons	16 September 2023 2:00pm	Cornwall Park
Waikato	10 – 62	Counties Manukau	16 September 2023 2:00pm	Resthills Park
Otago Whalers	32 – 14	Canterbury Bulls	17 September 2023 12:00pm	Forsyth Barr Stadium

=== Ladder ===
Pos	Team	Pld	W	L	PF	PA	PD	Pts
Pool A
1	Auckland Vulcans	3	3	0	126	50	76	6
2	Akarana Falcons	3	2	1	92	64	28	4
3	Waikato	3	0	3	52	140	-88	0
Pool B
1	Counties Manukau	3	3	0	142	30	112	6
2	Otago Whalers	3	1	2	74	92	-18	2
3	Canterbury Bulls	3	0	3	22	132	-110	0

=== Finals ===
Home	Score	Away	Date and time	Venue
Semi Finals
Akarana Falcons	8 – 26	Counties Manukau	23 September 2023 12:00pm	The Trusts Arena
Auckland Vulcans	50 – 6	Otago Whalers	23 September 2023 3:00pm	The Trusts Arena
Relegation Match
Canterbury Bulls	vs	Waikato	1 October 2023 12:00pm	Navigation Homes Stadium
Grand Final
Counties Manukau	4-70	Auckland Vulcans	1 October 2023 2:00pm	Navigation Homes Stadium

==== Chart ====
Semi-finals
23 September - Trusts Arena
Akarana	8
Counties Manukau	26
23 September - Trusts Arena
Auckland	50
Otago	6

Final
1 October - Navigation Homes Stadium
Counties Manukau	4
Auckland	70

== National Championship ==
=== North Island Championship ===
Home	Score	Away	Date and time	Venue
Coastline Mariners	28 – 42	Northern Swords	10 September 2023 12:00pm	Mitchell Park
Northern Swords	24 – 40	Bay of Plenty Lakers	17 September 2023 1:00pm	Unknown
Bay of Plenty Lakers	22 – 0	Coastline Mariners	23 September 2023 12:00pm	Puketawhero Park

=== South Island Championship Pool 1 ===
Home	Score	Away	Date and time	Venue
Hawke's Bay Unicorns	36 – 6	Manawatu Mustangs	10 September 2023 11:00am	Coronation Park
Hawke's Bay Unicorns	18 – 42	Wellington Orcas	10 September 2023 1:00pm	Coronation Park
Manawatu Mustangs	16 – 32	Wellington Orcas	10 September 2023 3:00pm	Coronation Park

=== South Island Championship Pool 2 ===
Home	Score	Away	Date and time	Venue
Aoraki Eels	46 – 16	West Coast Chargers	16 September 2023 1:30pm	Ashbury Park
West Coast Chargers	24 – 20	Aoraki Eels	23 September 2023 1:00pm	Wingham Park

=== Ladder ===
Pos	Team	Pld	W	L	PF	PA	PD	Pts
Pool A
1	Bay of Plenty Lakers	2	2	0	62	24	38	4
2	Northern Swords	2	1	1	66	68	-2	2
3	Coastline Mariners	2	0	2	28	64	-36	0
National Men's Championship (South Island)
1	Wellington Orcas	2	2	0	74	34	40	4
2	Hawke's Bay Unicorns	2	1	1	54	48	6	2
3	Manawatu Mustangs	2	0	2	22	68	-46	0
National Men's Championship (South Island)
1	Aoraki Eels	2	1	1	66	40	26	2
2	West Coast Chargers	2	1	1	40	66	-26	2
3	Southland Rams (withdrew)	0	0	0	0	0	0	0

=== Finals ===
Home	Score	Away	Date and time	Venue
Semi Finals
Bay of Plenty Lakers		Wellington Orcas		
Aoraki Eels		Bye		
Grand Final
Bay of Plenty Lakers	62-16	Aoraki Eels	7 October 2023	Trusts Arena

==== Chart ====
Semi-finals
Bay of Plenty
Wellington
Aoraki
Bye

Final
Bay of Plenty	62
Aoraki	16

== Club Competitions ==
=== Auckland ===
The 2023 season was the 115th season of the Auckland Rugby League Premiership.

== Australian Competitions ==
The New Zealand Warriors played in their 29th professional first grade season in the Australian National Rugby League competition.

The Warriors finished 4th after the regular season with a 16–8 record for the season. In the Qualifying Final, the Warriors lost 32–6 to the Penrith Panthers. As a result, they faced the Newcastle Knights in the second week of the finals at home at Go Media Stadium and won 40–10. The side then travelled to play the Brisbane Broncos in the Preliminary Final, where they lost 42-12 and were eliminated from the competition a game short of the Grand Final.

== See also ==
- 2023 PNGNRL season
- 2023 NRL season
- Super League XXVIII
- Elite One Championship 2022–2023
