= 2022 New Zealand rugby league season =

Rugby league season

NZRL National Competition 2022
- League: National Competition
- Teams: 12
- Premiers: Akarana Falcons (9th title)
- Minor premiers: Akarana Falcons
- Broadcast partners: Sky Sport

The 2022 New Zealand rugby league season was the 115th season of rugby league played in New Zealand. The main feature of the year was the National Competition, run by the New Zealand Rugby League.

== National Premiership ==
Select matches were broadcast live by Sky Sport.

=== Teams ===
Four teams contested the National Premiership, all in a single division round robin followed by a final.

Team	City/Region	Home Grounds
Akarana Falcons	Auckland	Mount Smart Stadium, Auckland Pulman Park, Auckland
Canterbury Bulls	Christchurch	Ngā Puna Wai Sports Hub, Christchurch
Counties Manukau Stingrays	South Auckland	Mount Smart Stadium, Auckland
Waikato Mana	Hamilton	FMG Stadium Waikato, Hamilton

=== Results ===
==== Round 1 ====
Home	Score	Away	Date	Venue
Akarana Falcons	32–20	Counties Manukau	10 September	Pulman Park (Field 1)
Canterbury Bulls	42–12	Waikato	11 September	Nga Puna Wai

==== Round 2 ====
Home	Score	Away	Date	Venue
Waikato	6–68	Akarana Falcons	17 September	FMG Stadium Waikato
Canterbury Bulls	26–18	Counties Manukau	18 September	Nga Puna Wai

==== Round 3 ====
Home	Score	Away	Date	Venue
Waikato	30–38	Counties Manukau	24 September	FMG Stadium Waikato
Canterbury Bulls	12–50	Akarana Falcons	25 September	Nga Puna Wai

=== Ladder ===
Team	Pld	W	D	L	PF	PA	PD	Pts	Stage
Akarana Falcons (P)	3	3	0	0	150	38	+112	12	Grand Final
Canterbury Bulls	3	2	0	1	80	80	0	10	Grand Final
Counties Manukau	3	1	0	2	76	88	-12	10	
Waikato (R)	3	0	0	3	48	148	-100	10	

Note: (P) = Premiers, (R) = Relegated to Championship for 2023

=== Final ===
National Competition Grand Final
Home	Score	Away	Date	Venue
Akarana Falcons	46–4	Canterbury Bulls	1 October	North Harbour Stadium

== National Championship ==
Select matches were broadcast live by Sky Sport.

=== Teams ===
Eight teams contested the National Championship, with four in the North Island Championship pool and four in the South Island Championship pool.

Team	City/Region	Home Grounds
North Island Conference
Auckland Vulcans	Auckland	Mount Smart Stadium, Auckland
Mid-Central Vipers	New Plymouth	Yarrow Stadium, New Plymouth
Upper Central Stallions	Tauranga & Rotorua	Rotorua International Stadium, Rotorua
Wellington Orcas	Wellington	Jerry Collins Stadium, Porirua
South Island Conference
Aoraki Eels	South Christchurch	Nga Puna Wai, Christchurch
Otago Rugby League	Dunedin	Forsyth Barr Stadium, Dunedin
Southland Rams	Invercargill	Rugby Park Stadium, Invercargill
West Coast Chargers	Greymouth	Wingham Park, Greymouth

=== Ladder ===
==== North Island Championship ====
Team	Pld	W	D	L	PF	PA	PD	Pts	Stage
Auckland Vulcans (P)	3	0	3	0	124	26	98	6	National Championship Final
Upper Central Stallions	3	0	1	2	58	70	-12	2	
Mid-Central Vipers	3	0	1	2	60	88	-28	2	
Wellington Orcas	3	0	1	2	40	98	-58	2	

Note: (P) = Promoted to Premiership for 2023

==== South Island Championship ====
Team	Pld	W	D	L	PF	PA	PD	Pts	Stage
Otago Rugby League	3	3	0	0	129	60	69	6	South Island Semi-Final
Southland Rams	3	2	0	1	94	104	-10	4	South Island Semi-Final
West Coast Chargers	3	1	0	2	84	61	23	2	
Aoraki Eels	3	0	0	3	64	146	-82	0	

Note: (P) = Promoted to Premiership for 2023

=== Finals ===
National Championship Finals
Home	Score	Away	Date	Venue
Semi Final (South Island Final)
Otago Rugby League	34–0	Southland Rams	24 September	Otago
Championship Final
Auckland Vulcans	48–12	Otago Rugby League	1 October	North Harbour Stadium

== Club Competitions ==
=== Auckland ===
The 2022 season was the 115th season of the Auckland Rugby League Premiership. In the First Grade Fox Memorial Premiership, the Pt Chevalier Pirates claimed a 14 – 12 victory over the Glenora Bears in the final at Mount Smart Stadium.

In the final of the Fox Memorial Championship, the Northcote Tigers defeated the Pakuranga Jaguars 32 – 28.

== Australian Competitions ==
The New Zealand Warriors played in their 28th professional first grade season in the Australian National Rugby League competition.

On 3 July, during the 2022 NRL season, Auckland's Mount Smart Stadium hosted its first NRL game in over two years when the Warriors defeated the Wests Tigers 22–2 in front of a sellout crowd of 26,009 fans in round 16.

The Warriors finished 15th and missed the finals as a result.

== See also ==
- 2022 NRL season
- Super League XXVII
- Elite One Championship 2021–2022
- Elite One Championship 2022–2023
- 2022 PNGNRL season
