= NZRL National Competition =

Rugby league competition

NZRL Men's National Competition
- Current season or competition: 2022 New Zealand rugby league season
- Sport: Rugby league
- Formerly known as: Bartercard Premiership
- Instituted: 2010
- Inaugural season: 2010
- Number of teams: 12
- Country: New Zealand
- Holders: Akarana Falcons (2022)
- Most titles: Akarana Falcons (9 titles)
- Website: www.NZRL.co.nz/
- Broadcast partner: Sky Sport

The NZRL Men's National Competition (previously called the National Zonal Competition) is the top-level rugby league competition run by the New Zealand Rugby League. In 2010 the competition replaced the Bartercard Premiership following a Sparc funded review and restructure of the New Zealand Rugby League. Since 2019, the competition has consisted of a four-team national premiership and an eight-team national championship (split into North and South Island Conferences) with a promotion and relegation between the two divisions.

== Trophies and awards ==
Senior teams compete for the Albert Baskerville Trophy, which is named after Albert Baskerville, the organiser of the 1907-1908 All Golds tour. Under-17s compete for the Mark Graham Cup, which is named after Mark Graham, the New Zealand Rugby League player of the century. Under-15s compete for the Nathan Cayless Cup, which is named after Nathan Cayless, the only captain to win the World Cup for New Zealand.

=== Structure ===
The competition was reformatted for the 2016 season, with Akarana, Counties Manukau, Canterbury and Wellington competing in a national championship. The Upper Central and Mid-Central zones reverted to district teams with these teams, alongside Northland and the South Island districts, competing in four regional championships. The four regional winners then compete in a National Premiership competition, which play a promotion-relegation match against the last placed national championship side.

From 2019, this changed again, with a 4-team Premiership and 8-team, two conference (North and South Island) Championship contested.

== NZRL Premiership Teams ==
Team	City/Region	Current Coach	Home Grounds
Akarana Falcons	Auckland	Steve Buckingham	Mount Smart Stadium, Auckland
Canterbury Bulls	Christchurch	Andrew Auimatagi	Ngā Puna Wai Sports Hub, Christchurch
Counties Manukau Stingrays	South Auckland	Rod Ratu	Mount Smart Stadium, Auckland
Waikato Mana	Hamilton		FMG Stadium Waikato, Hamilton

== NZRL Championship Teams ==
Team	City/Region	Current Coach	Home Grounds
North Island Conference
Auckland Vulcans	Auckland		Mount Smart Stadium, Auckland
Mid-Central Vipers	New Plymouth		Yarrow Stadium, New Plymouth
Upper Central Stallions	Tauranga & Rotorua		Rotorua International Stadium, Rotorua
Wellington Orcas	Wellington	Mike Kuiti	Jerry Collins Stadium, Porirua
South Island Conference
Aoraki Eels	South Canterbury		Ashbury Park, Timaru
Otago Rugby League	Dunedin		Forsyth Barr Stadium, Dunedin
Southland Rams	Invercargill		Rugby Park Stadium, Invercargill
West Coast Chargers	Greymouth		Wingham Park, Greymouth

== Season winners ==
Year	Premiership					Championship			Juniors	
Year	Albert Baskerville Trophy	Score	Runner up	Minor Premiers	Wooden Spoon	Championship winner	Score	Championship Runner-Up	Mark Graham Cup (U-17)	Nathan Cayless Cup (U-15)
2010	Auckland	14–6	Counties Manukau	Auckland	Northern Swords	N/A	N/A	N/A	Counties Manukau	Counties Manukau
2011	Auckland Pride	44–34	South Island	Auckland Pride	Northern Swords	N/A	N/A	N/A	Auckland Pride	Auckland Pride
2012	Akarana Falcons	38–20	Counties Manukau	Counties Manukau	Northern Swords	N/A	N/A	N/A	Akarana Falcons	Counties Manukau
2013	Akarana Falcons	22–12	Counties Manukau	Counties Manukau	Central Vipers	N/A	N/A	N/A	Counties Manukau	Akarana Falcons
2014	Canterbury Bulls	40–8	Waicoa Bay Stallions	Counties Manukau (Note: In 2014 Counties Manukau were disqualified from the final for fielding an ineligible player.)	Northern Swords	N/A	N/A	N/A	Akarana Falcons	Akarana Falcons
2015	Counties Manukau	41–10	Canterbury Bulls	Counties Manukau	Northern Swords	N/A	N/A	N/A	Akarana Falcons	Akarana Falcons
2016	Akarana Falcons	32–12	Counties Manukau	Counties Manukau	Wellington Orcas	Waikato			Akarana Falcons	Counties Manukau
2017	Akarana Falcons	30–4	Waikato	Akarana Falcons	Wellington Orcas	Bay of Plenty Lakers				
2018	Akarana Falcons	51–20	Counties Manukau	Akarana Falcons	Wellington Orcas					
2019	Akarana Falcons	28–10	Canterbury Bulls	Akarana Falcons	Waikato					
2020	Akarana Falcons	64–18	Counties Manukau	Akarana Falcons	Waikato	Northern Swords	22–20	Otago Whalers		
2021 (Note: In 2021, due to COVID-19, the Premiership and Championship were merged into a single competition.)	Upper Central Stallions	36–22	Canterbury Bulls			N/A	N/A	N/A		
2022	Akarana Falcons	46–4	Canterbury Bulls	Akarana Falcons	Waikato	Auckland Vulcans	48–12	Otago	Counties Manukau	Counties Manukau
2023	Auckland Vulcans	70-4	Counties Manukau	Auckland Vulcans	Canterbury Bulls	Bay of Plenty Lakers	62-16	Aoraki Eels		

== See also ==
- NZRL National Youth Tournament
- NZRL National Secondary Schools Tournament
- NZRL Women's National Competition
