= Bob Banham =

New Zealand rugby league footballer

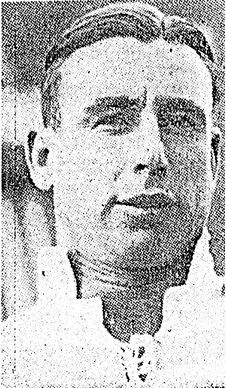

Personal information
- Full name: John Robert Banham
- Born: 22 September 1912 Glenbrook, New South Wales, Australia
- Died: 20 December 1999 (aged 87) Mascot, New South Wales, Australia

Playing information
- Position: Five-eighth
Club
Years	Team	Pld	T	G	FG	P
1936–37	South Sydney	16	5	0	0	15
1938	North Shore Albions	5	2	0	0	6
1938	City Rovers	12	5	2	0	19
1938	Newton Rangers (guest)	2	4	1	0	14
1939–40	Mount Albert United	32	3	43	0	95
1941	South Sydney	14	3	0	0	9
	Total	81	22	46	0	158
Representative
Years	Team	Pld	T	G	FG	P
1937	New South Wales City	1	0	0	0	0
1938–40	Auckland Pakehā	4	3	0	0	9
1938	Auckland	1	1	0	0	3
1939	New Zealand Probable (trial)	2	1	0	0	3
1939	New Zealand	2	0	0	0	0
- Source: As of 30 August 2021

John Robert Banham (22 September 1912 – 20 December 1999), was a professional rugby league footballer who represented the New Zealand national rugby league team and New South Wales City.

== Playing career ==
Banham played for the South Sydney Rabbitohs in the NSWRL Premiership, scoring five tries between 1936 and 1937. He represented New South Wales City in 1937. In 1938 the Auckland Rugby League signed Banham as player-coach. They decided to place him with teams that would benefit from his playing and coaching. He joined the North Shore Albions initially and played the first half of the 1938 season with them before being moved to the City Rovers club for the remainder of the season. He also made 2 appearances for Newton Rangers. The first was on their trip to Christchurch to play a Canterbury XIII, and the second was in a midweek match against the touring Canterbury provincial side. On his return to the City side he helped lead them to the Roope Rooster final which they lost to Richmond Rovers by 20 to 8. Banham also played a match for Auckland Pakeha against Auckland Māori on 6 June which was won by the Māori side by 26 points to 21. On 16 July he made his Auckland debut against the returning New Zealand side who had been on tour in Australia. The match was played at Carlaw Park with Auckland winning 21 to 13 and Banham scoring one of their tries.

He was named for New Zealand in 1939 but did not play a test, due to the cancellation of the 1939 tour of Great Britain. He returned to Australia in September 1940 with the intention of joining the Australian forces. In 1941 played several games for the South Sydney Rabbitohs and scored three tries.
