= Trevor Patrick =

New Zealand international rugby league footballer

Personal information
- Full name: Trevor Wharetapu Patrick
- Born: 2 September 1947 (age 77)

Playing information
- Height: 1.675 m (5 ft 6 in)
- Weight: 87 kg (13 st 10 lb)
- Position: Stand-off
Representative
Years	Team	Pld	T	G	FG	P
1968–71	Otago
1969–70	New Zealand	2	0	0	0	0

Trevor Wharetapu Patrick (born 2 September 1947) is a New Zealand former professional rugby league footballer who played in the 1960s and 1970s. He played at representative level for New Zealand, and Otago, as a stand-off.

Before coming to Dunedin to taking physical education studies at the University of Otago in 1968, Patrick played rugby league in the Waikato town of Huntly. He was selected as a New Zealand Schoolboy Kiwi in 1962.

He also represented New Zealand Universities at rugby league between 1969 and 1984. His last appearance was as captain of the first NZU side to Great Britain and France in 1984. Two years later he coached New Zealand Universities to a win in the inaugural University Rugby League World Cup in Auckland.

His second son Hone Patrick, represented New Zealand Universities at rugby league in two matches in 2006, including the Test match against Australia Universities at Mt Smart Stadium.

== International honours ==
Patrick represented New Zealand in 1969 against Australia, and in 1970 against Great Britain.
