= Malo Solomona =

Former Samoa international rugby league footballer

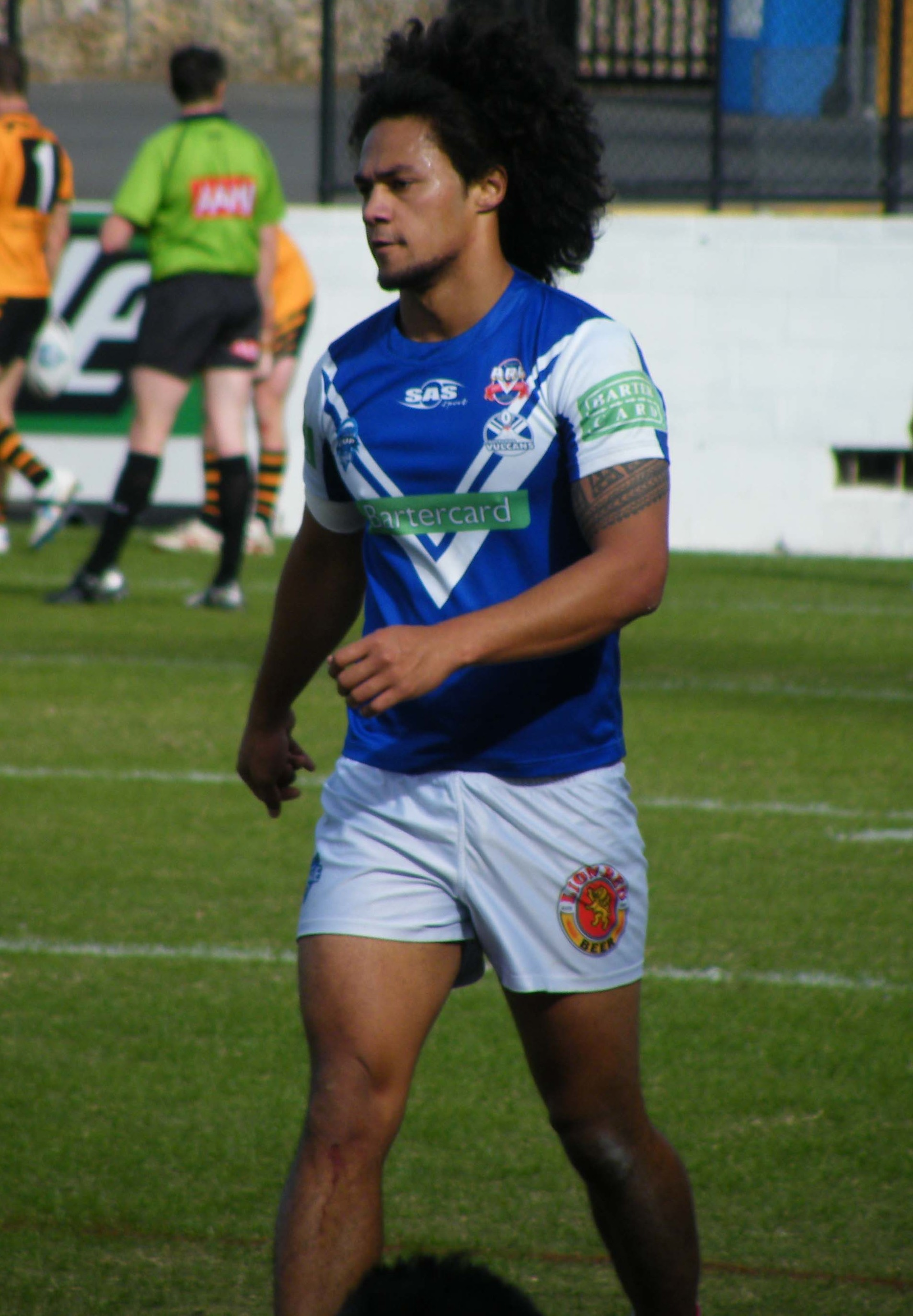

Personal information
- Full name: Malofou Solomona
- Born: 10 May 1987 (age 39) Auckland, New Zealand
- Height: 182 cm (6 ft 0 in)
- Weight: 88 kg (13 st 12 lb)

Playing information
- Position: Wing
Club
Years	Team	Pld	T	G	FG	P
2008–10	New Zealand Warriors	8	3	0	0	12
Representative
Years	Team	Pld	T	G	FG	P
2006–10	Samoa	5	5	0	0	20

Malofou Solomona (born 10 May 1987) is a former Samoa international rugby league footballer who plays on the wing for the Point Chevalier Pirates in the Auckland Rugby League.

== Background ==
Solomona was born in Auckland, New Zealand. He is of Samoan and Maori descent.

== Early years ==
Solomona attended Mt Albert Grammar School, and played rugby league for the Richmond Rovers club.

Between 2005 and 2006 Solomona spent time in Townsville, as part of the North Queensland Cowboys development squad.

He then returned to the Auckland Rugby League competition and also played for the Auckland Lions at Bartercard Cup level before being signed by the New Zealand Warriors.

He is a cousin of Superleague player David Solomona and Se'e Solomona is his uncle.

== Warriors ==
After signing for the Warriors he played for the Auckland Lions in the NSWRL Premier League where he scored 15 tries in 21 matches in the 2007 season.

In 2008 he played for both the Auckland Vulcans in the NSW Cup, and the Junior Warriors in the Toyota Cup. In Round 16 he made his National Rugby League debut on 29 June 2008 against the Wests Tigers at Leichhardt Oval. In only his third first-class game he scored a hat-trick of tries against the Canterbury-Bankstown Bulldogs at ANZ Stadium, Sydney on 19 July 2008.

== Later years ==
In 2010 Solomona played for the Te Atatu Roosters in the 2010 Fox Memorial. He was selected to represent Auckland in the 2010 National Zonal Competition.

Solomona joined the Glenora Bears for 2011 before moving to the Point Chevalier Pirates for the 2013 and 2014 seasons.

== Representative career ==
He is a Samoan international, playing for the side in 2006.

In 2008 he was named in the Samoa training squad for the 2008 Rugby League World Cup but did not make the final 24-man team.

He was named in the New Zealand Māori squad in 2015 to play Auckland.
