= Corey Lawrie =

New Zealand rugby league footballer

Personal information
- Born: 15 February 1980 (age 46) Christchurch, New Zealand
- Height: 170 cm (5 ft 7 in)
- Weight: 90 kg (14 st 2 lb)

Playing information
- Position: Lock
Club
Years	Team	Pld	T	G	FG	P
2007	New Zealand Warriors	4	0	0	0	0
2008	Doncaster RLFC		0	0	0	0
	Total	4	0	0	0	0
- Source: As of 14 Sep 2022

Corey Lawrie (born 15 February 1980) is a New Zealand rugby league footballer who is the player-coach of the Hornby Panthers. His position of choice is at lock-forward.

== Background ==
Lawrie was born in Christchurch, New Zealand.

== Playing career ==
Lawrie has previously represented the Canterbury Bulls in the Bartercard Cup, the Auckland Lions in the NSWRL Premier League, and the New Zealand Warriors in the Telstra Premiership. He made his first grade début for the Warriors on 15 April 2007 against the North Queensland Cowboys.

After being released by the Warriors, Lawrie joined Doncaster in National League Two in England.

In 2009 Lawrie returned to Christchurch and his junior club, the Hornby Panthers.

Lawrie was named in a West Coast XIII to play in a curtain raiser match against Canterbury on 4 February 2011. The match is before the New Zealand Warriors v Newcastle Knights preseason charity match that will raise money for the Pike River Mine disaster trust. He became the player-coach of the Panthers for the 2011 season.

Lawrie represented the Canterbury Bulls in the National Competition in 2014.
