= Sam McKendry =

NZ international rugby league footballer

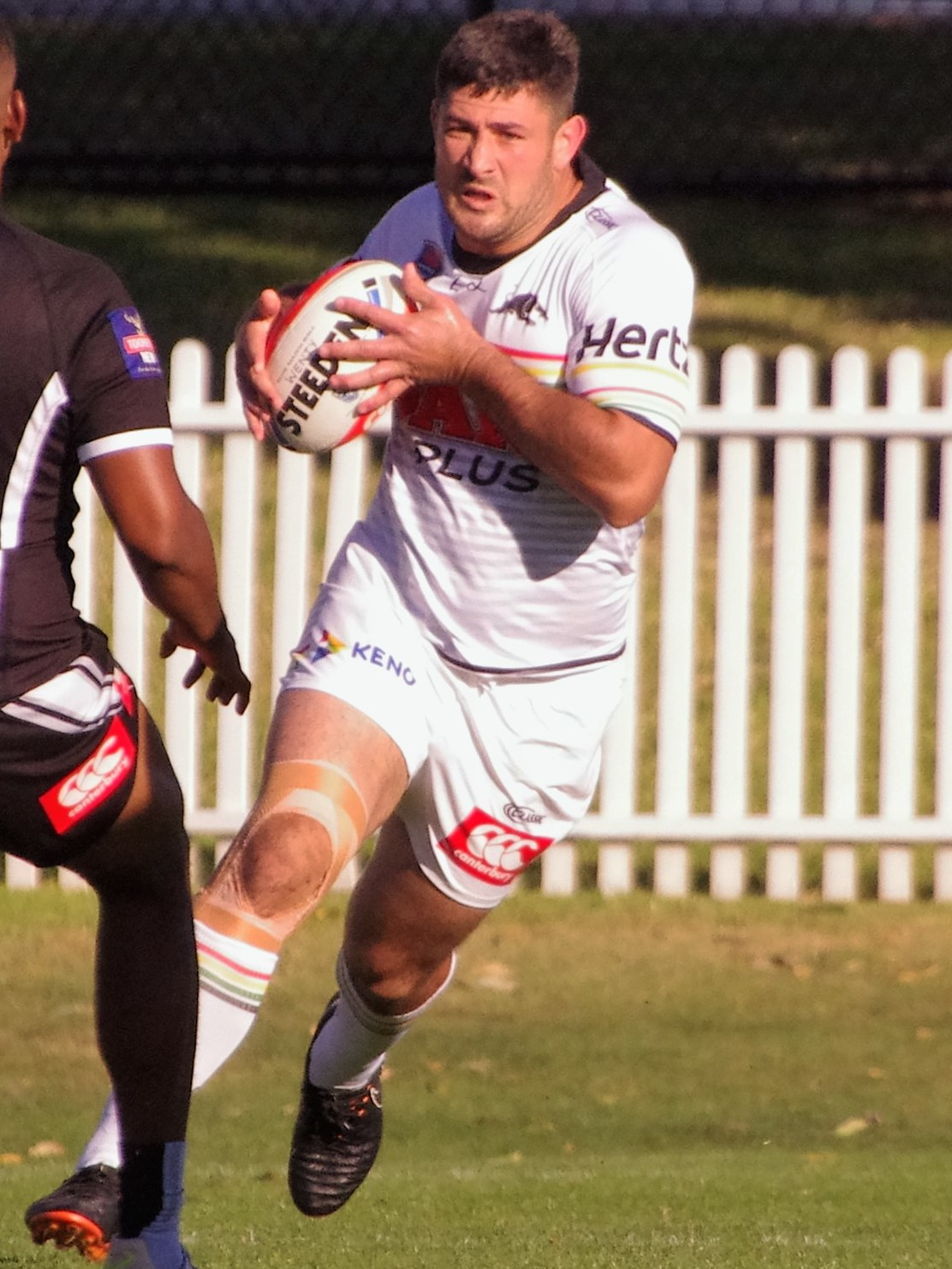

Personal information
- Born: 19 July 1989 (age 37) Stirling, Western Australia, Australia
- Height: 185 cm (6 ft 1 in)
- Weight: 115 kg (18 st 2 lb)

Playing information
- Position: Prop
Club
Years	Team	Pld	T	G	FG	P
2008–18	Penrith Panthers	147	8	0	0	32
Representative
Years	Team	Pld	T	G	FG	P
2008–10	New Zealand Māori	2	1	0	0	4
2010–13	New Zealand	8	0	0	0	0
- Source: As of 13 August 2019

Sam McKendry (born 19 July 1989) is a former New Zealand Māori and New Zealand international rugby league footballer who played as a prop for the Penrith Panthers in the NRL.

== Early years ==
McKendry was born in Stirling, Western Australia and is of Māori and Scottish descent. McKendry moved to New Zealand at the age of 8, and was raised in Dargaville. He boarded at Mt Albert Grammar School in Auckland, playing his junior rugby league for the Mt Albert Lions and representing the Junior Kiwis.

== Playing career ==
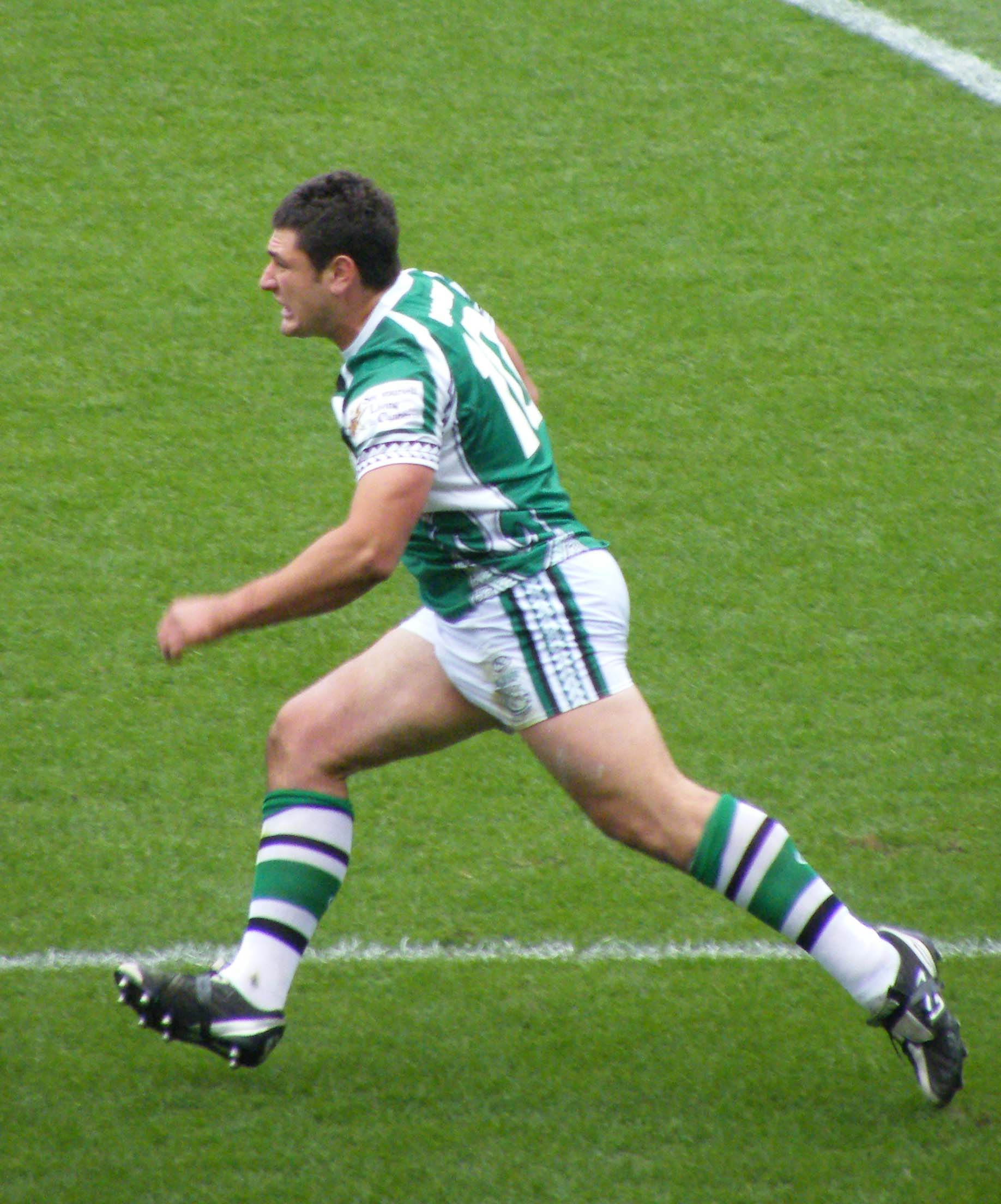
McKendry playing for the New Zealand Māori in 2008

McKendry was signed by the Penrith Panthers in 2006, having initially been spotted by the Parramatta Eels. He played for the Panthers' in their 2007 Jersey Flegg Cup Grand Final-winning team against the Eels, scoring a try. Making his NRL debut for the Panthers in round 10 of the 2008 season, McKendry primarily played in the NYC for the Panthers between 2008 and 2009, for a total of 44 matches. He moved into the Panthers' NRL squad in 2010.

McKendry missed the end of the 2016 season due an anterior cruciate ligament (ACL) knee injury, and the entirety of the 2017 season after re-injuring it during a pre-season trial against the Parramatta Eels. McKendry returned to the NRL in 2018 but once again injured his ACL, against the South Sydney Rabbitohs in round 2. He stayed on the field for 13 minutes after initially going down, before the extent of the injury was revealed during the following week.

On 16 September 2019, it was revealed that McKendry was one of ten players to be released at the end of the season by the Penrith club. On 29 November 2019, McKendry announced his retirement as a player from the NRL. McKendry broke the news via his Instagram page saying "I've spent the last 13 years with Penrith doing what I love as a job and got to live out my dream. My career didn't end as I planned due to consecutive ACL injuries but I never let injury force me into medical retirement and fought back each time to retire on my own terms. It's been one hell of a journey and it wasn't always easy but I wouldn't change a thing, my footy days are not over completely though as I have agreed to play with St Mary's in 2020, looking forward to running around with the boys".

== Representative career ==
In 2008 McKendry played for the New Zealand Māori in a curtain raiser to the 2008 World Cup.

In 2010 he was named in the New Zealand national rugby league team squad for the Four Nations tournament after Fuifui Moimoi withdrew due to injury. McKendry again played for the New Zealand Māori in 2010 against England as part of the build up to the Four Nations. He made his Test debut for the Kiwis in their match against Papua New Guinea.

== Personal life ==
McKendry is married to Kirsten McKendry (née Grech). The couple have three children together.
