= Central Vipers =

Former New Zealand rugby team

Club information
- Colours: Green, Black, Yellow

Current details
- Grounds: Clifton Park, Waitara; Arena Manawatu, Palmerston North; Yarrow Stadium, New Plymouth

The Central Vipers were a New Zealand rugby league team that represented the Mid-Central Zone in the Albert Baskerville Trophy. The team drew on players from the Hawkes Bay, Manawatu and Taranaki districts. In 2010 the Central Vipers were known as Heartland. The competition was re-organised in 2016 and the districts entered teams in their own right.
