= Upper Central Stallions =

Rugby league team in New Zealand

Club information
- Colours: Black; White
- Founded: 2004

Current details
- Grounds: Davies Park; Puketawhero Park; Resthills Park
- Competition: National Competition

Records
- Premierships: 2021
- Runners-up: 2014

The Upper Central Stallions were a rugby league team that represent the Upper Central Zone of the New Zealand Rugby League. The Zone comprises four districts: Waikato, Coastline Rugby League, Bay of Plenty, and Gisborne Tairawhiti Rugby League. The team competed in the NZRL National Competition as the Waicoa Bay Stallions until the competition was re-organised in 2016 and the districts entered teams in their own right. The team briefly returned as the Upper Central Stallions, winning the competition in 2021.

Because they represented a vast area, the Stallions had a number of home grounds, hosting games in Huntly, Rotorua and Tauranga in 2014. In 2014, the Stallions were promoted to the National Premiership Grand Final, losing to the Canterbury Bulls 40–8. It was the only time the Wai-Coa-Bay Stallions made a National Premiership Grand Final.

In the past, the Wai-Coa-Bay Stallions competed in the now defunct Bartercard Cup rugby league competition. The team was then split up into Waikato and Bay of Plenty when the Bartercard Premiership started in 2008.

== Notable players ==
In their debut year they were coached by former international Tawera Nikau .

New Zealand Warriors assigned to the club included Lance Hohaia, Wairangi Koopu & Sam Rapira. The Stallions most notable local product was Isaac John.

== History ==
The Stallions joined the competition in 2004, replacing the Taranaki Wildcats. They were not disgraced in their first year, performing well for a new club and securing four wins and two draws. However, in their second season they could only manage three wins and ended up collecting the Wooden Spoon. In 2006 they missed the finals again, finishing eighth out of ten teams. In the final year of the competition, 2007, they finished seventh. The Stallions finished 2nd= in 2015 only to have the senior team quashed by NZRL that sanctioned a new National competition for 2016. The Stallions still play as Wai-Coa-Bay in the U15s and U17s age groups that compete every year at the NZRL National Youth Tournament.

Season	Pld	W	D	L	PF	PA	PD	Pts	Position	Finals
2004	16	4	2	10	380	455	-75	10	Ninth (Twelve)	N/A
2005	16	3	0	13	368	620	-252	6	Wooden Spoon (Twelve)	N/A
2006	18	5	2	11	494	662	-168	12	Eighth (Ten)	N/A
2007	18	5	1	12	418	682	-264	11	Seventh (10)	N/A
