= Auckland Vulcans =

NZ defunct rugby league team

Club information
- Colours: Blue & White
- Founded: 2008; 18 years ago
- Exited: 2013; 13 years ago

Former details
- Ground: Mount Smart Stadium
- Competition: New South Wales Cup
- Team colours

Records
- Runners-up: 2011; 15 years ago

The Auckland Vulcans were an Auckland based rugby league club that participated in the New South Wales Cup. They were administered by the Rugby League Development Foundation. The team was selected from the Auckland Rugby League's Fox Memorial Competition and also used New Zealand Warriors squad members not selected for NRL duty. In 2007 the team was known as the Auckland Lions. In 2011 the Vulcans made their first appearance in a grand final, eventually going down to the Canterbury Bankstown Bulldogs. They were replaced in the NSW Cup in 2014 by the New Zealand Warriors, who submitted their own team.

== Players ==
Four players have played for the Vulcans and the Junior Warriors and then gone on to make their National Rugby League debut with the New Zealand Warriors. They are Russell Packer, Daniel O'Regan, Sonny Fai and Leeson Ah Mau.

In addition to this Ukuma Ta'ai, Malo Solomona, Aidan Kirk and Corey Lawrie have all played for the Vulcans and then made their first grade debut for the Warriors.

In 2008 Ruben Wiki played in one match for the Vulcans.

== Coaches ==
The Vulcans were coached by Bernie Perenara in 2008 and 2009, Brent Gemmel in 2010, Richie Blackmore in 2011, Ricky Henry in 2012 and Willie Swann in 2013.

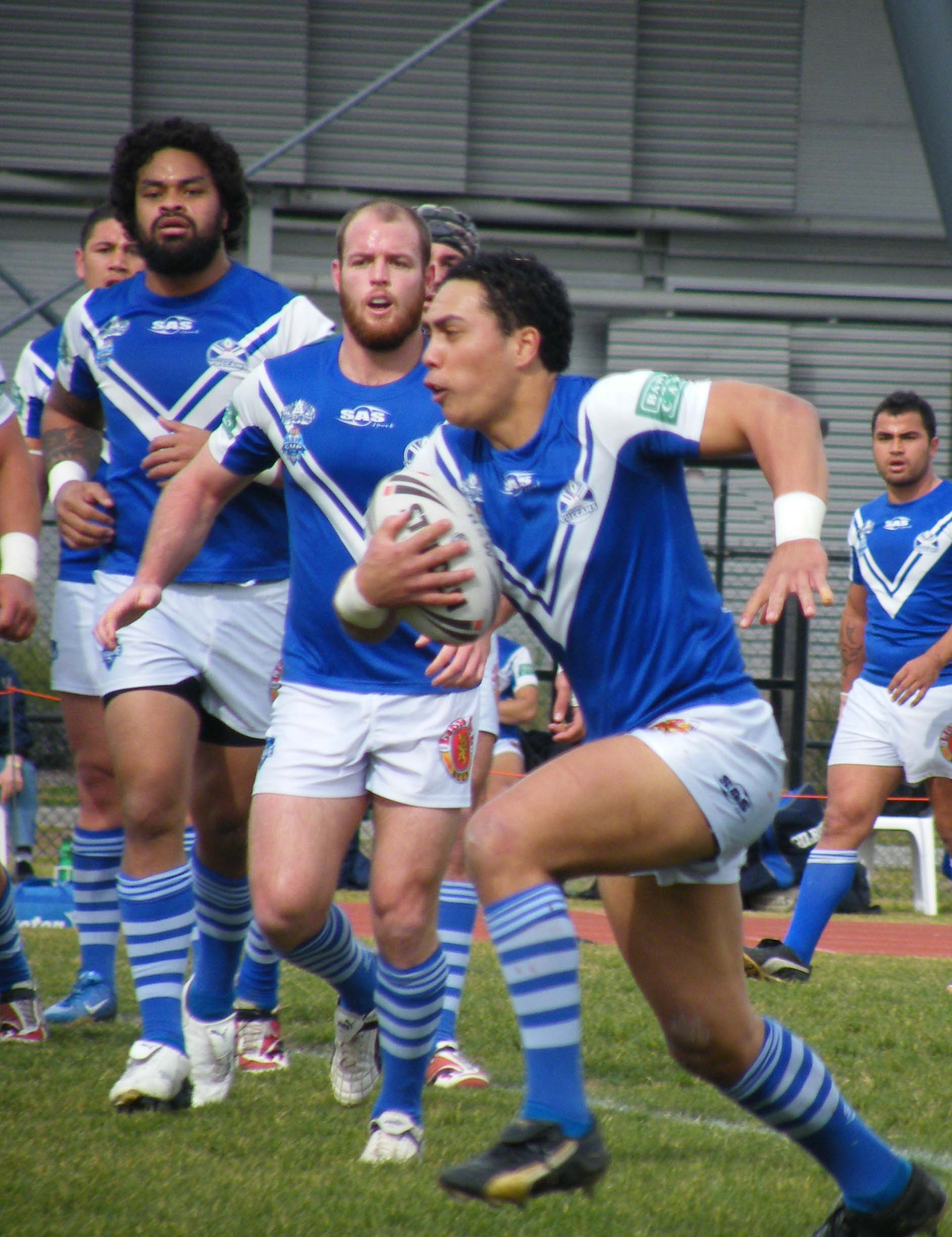
Auckland Vulcans in action in 2008

== See also ==
- Rugby league in New Zealand
- List of Auckland Vulcans Results
