= Auckland rugby league team =

New Zealand rugby league team

Auckland
Club information
- Full name: Auckland
- Founded: 1908

Current details
- Grounds: Mount Smart Stadium; Cornwall Park, Auckland
- Competition: National Competition

Records
- Premierships: 1965, 1966, 1967, 1968, 1969, 1971, 1972, 1973, 1974, 1976, 1977, 1978, 1979, 1983, 1984, 1985, 1986, 1987, 1988, 1989, 1990, 1991, 1992, 2008, 2010, 2011, 2012, 2013, 2016
- Minor premierships: 2010, 2011
- Rugby League Cup: 1910–21, 1924–26, 1928–29, 1950–59, 1960, 1961, 1964–68, 1986–89, 1991, 1995–96, 2008–09, 2012–present

The Auckland rugby league team is the team which traditionally represents all of the clubs which play in the Auckland Rugby League competition. As well as a senior men's team there are also Auckland representative teams throughout the various age groups such as under 15s, under 17s, under 19s and under 21s.

Under the new zone scheme introduced in 2010 the Auckland team represents the North Shore, East Auckland and West Auckland, while South Auckland is represented by the Counties Manukau rugby league team. The zone team is named the Akarana Falcons.

== History ==
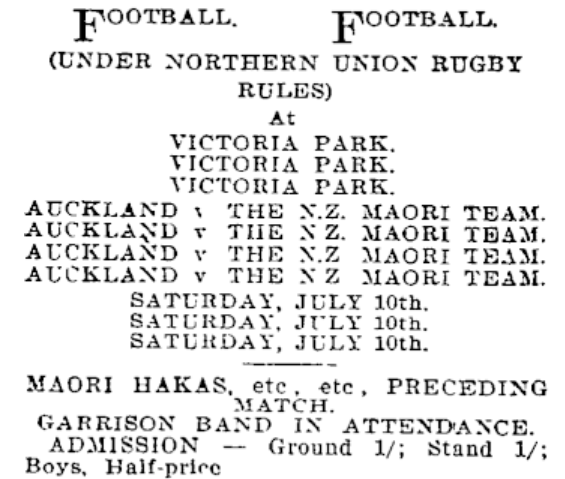
Advertisement for the Auckland v NZ Māori match at Victoria Park on July 10, 1909.

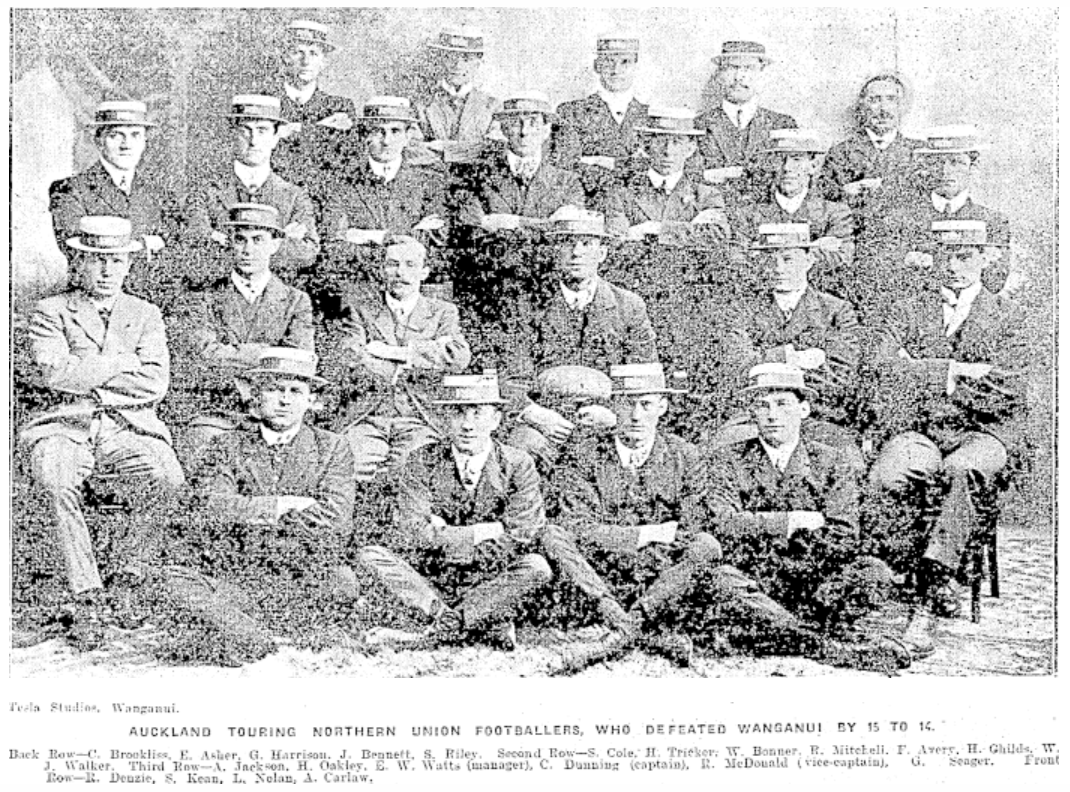

Auckland played its first game on 24 August 1908 when they took on Wellington at Victoria Park, Auckland in the first provincial game of rugby league in New Zealand. The Auckland Rugby League had not yet been formed so the side was not an official one as such.

Auckland had played against several touring teams over the years, though once the Auckland Warriors started playing in the 1995 ARL Premiership it diluted the standard of the representative side, and they have not played against full international sides in recent years. Auckland beat Australia, England and France in the space of 21 days in 1977. A feat which the Warriors commemorated by wearing replica strips in their clash with Australian club Manly-Warringah Sea Eagles in round 24 of the 2007 NRL season on 26 August 2007. The Warriors won 36–14 in front of a packed Mount Smart Stadium.

=== Current Auckland teams ===
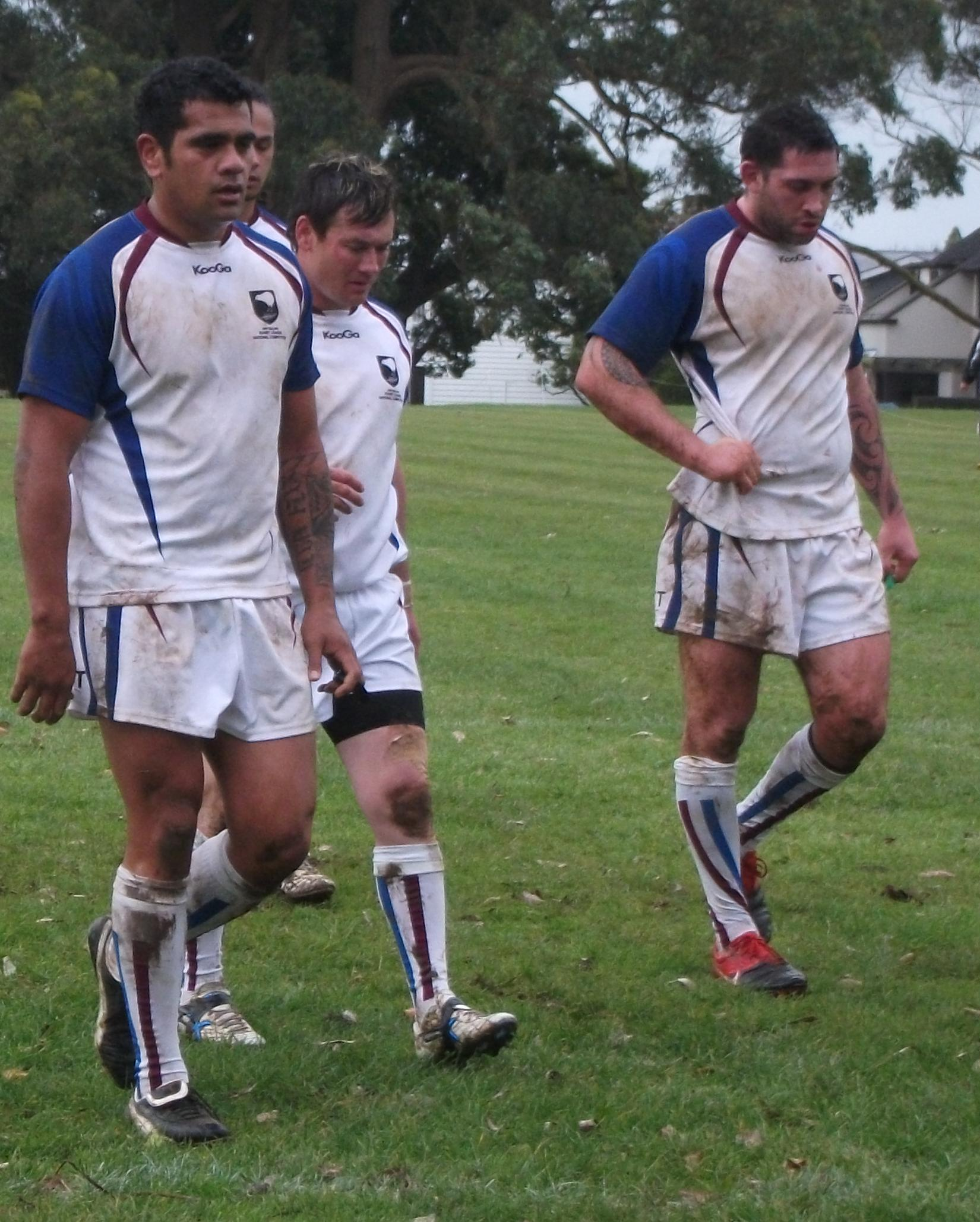
Auckland zone in 2010

The Akarana Falcons participate in the Albert Baskerville Trophy. This team represents the Hibiscus Coast Raiders, Richmond Bulldogs, Mt Wellington Warriors, Ponsonby Ponies, Glenora Bears, Ellerslie Eagles, Mt Albert Lions, Te Atatu Roosters, Bay Roskill Vikings, Northcote Tigers, Marist Saints, East Coast Bays Barracudas, Pt Chevalier Pirates, Waitemata Seagulls, Glenfield Greyhounds, New Lynn Stags and the Waiheke Rams.

== Colours ==
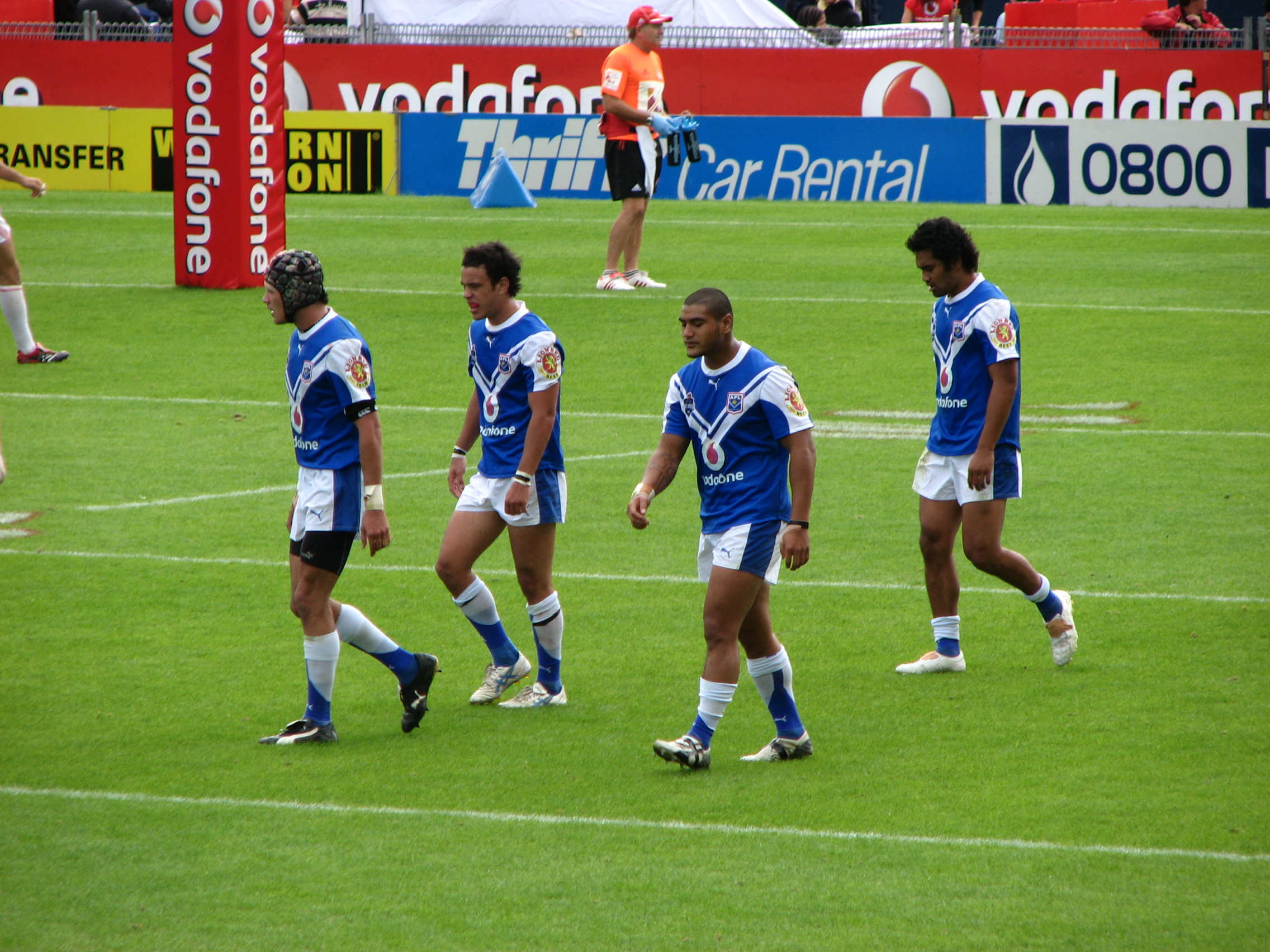
Auckland Lions players during a match against St George Illawarra in 2007

Auckland representative sides traditionally wear a blue jersey with a white double 'V', in the same style of the New Zealand national rugby league team jersey but with blue instead of black, this is still the jersey worn by the Auckland Vulcans NSW Cup team.

The Traditional "V" jersey

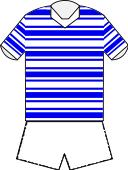
2009 Centennial jersey

== Record versus overseas touring teams ==
Auckland has a good record against touring international teams, recording multiple wins over Australia, Great Britain/England and France. Auckland holds the distinction of being (as of 2024) the last club or provincial side anywhere to defeat Australia when they defeated them 26–24 at Carlaw Park on the Aussie's 1989 Tour of New Zealand.

=== 1910 Auckland v Great Britain ===
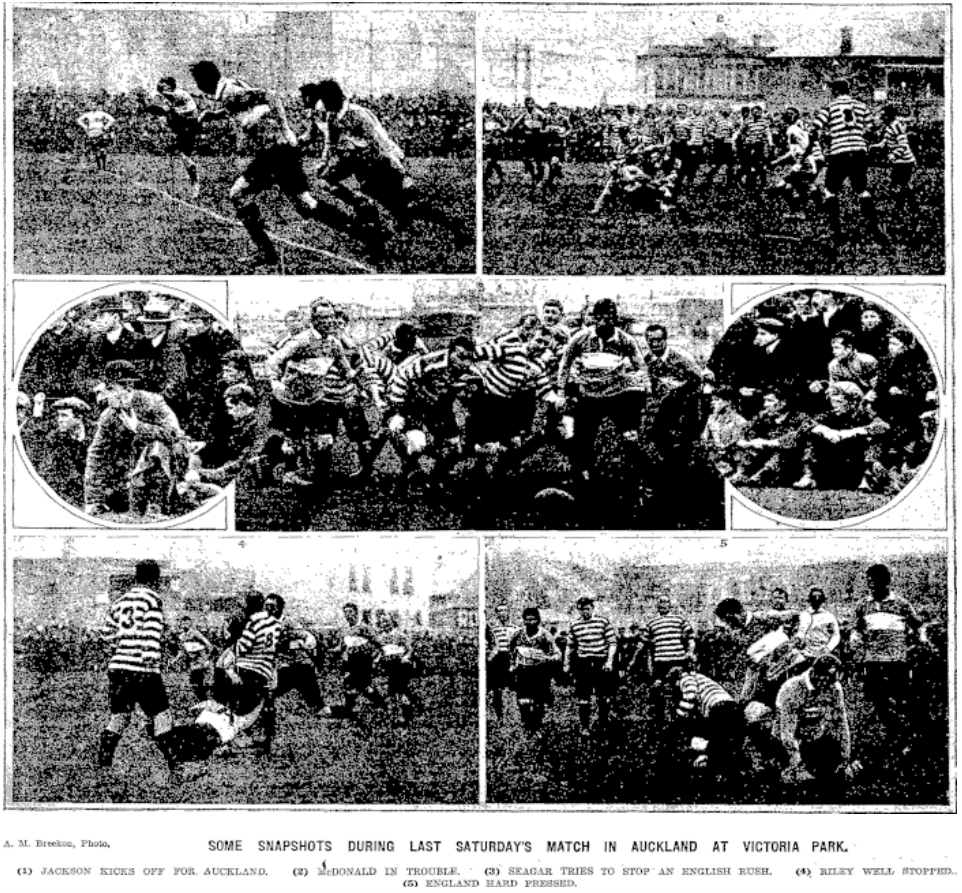

The team for the match was: (fullback) Alf Chorley; (three-quarters) L Nolan, George Smith, Albert Asher; (five-eights) Alfred Jackson, Ronald MacDonald; (halfback) Len Farrant; (forwards) Fred Jackson (captain), Charles Dunning, Jim Griffin, Alex Stanaway, Harry Fricker, and George Seagar. The emergency players named were (backs) Sid Riley, Arthur Carlaw; (forwards) Joe Bennett, Jim Rukutai, and Bob Mitchell.

23 July	Auckland	9–52	Great Britain	Victoria Park
3:00	Try: George Seagar, Albert Asher, Jim Griffin		Try: Bert Jenkins, Bill Jukes 2, Jim Davies 3, Joe Riley 2, Jim Leytham, Herbert Kershaw, Jim Lomas, Billy Winstanley; Con: James Lomas 7, Jim Leytham	Attendance: 10000; Referee: Jack Stanaway

=== 1912 Auckland v New South Wales ===
Auckland won their first victory over an ‘international’ side when they defeated New South Wales by 10 points to 3. The game was marred by several acts of violence with the visiting side said to be at fault repeatedly. Near the end of the match Sid Deane was sent off for punching Billy Curran.

31 August	Auckland	10–3	New South Wales	Victoria Park
3:00	Try: Bob Mitchell, Rukingi Reke; Con: Arthur Hardgrave; Pen: Charles Dunning		Try: Bob Williams	Attendance: 10,000; Referee: Angus Campbell

=== 1912 Auckland v New South Wales ===
New South Wales reversed their earlier loss with a comprehensive win over a disappointing Auckland effort. Charles Dunning and Bob Mitchell who had both been named to play originally were forced to withdraw due to illness and were replaced by Harry Fricker and Jim Griffin.

21 September	Auckland	2–25	New South Wales	Auckland Domain
3:00	Pen: Arthur Hardgrave		Try: Frank Burge, Arthur Halloway, Dan Frawley 4, Ray Norman; Con: Dan Frawley, Ray Norman	Attendance: 9000; Referee: Archie Ferguson

=== 1913 Auckland v New South Wales ===
30 August	Auckland	2–27	New South Wales	Auckland Domain
3:00	Pen: Karl Ifwersen		Try: Les Cubitt, Dan Frawley 2, Sid Deane 2, Con Sullivan, Billy Cann; Con: Dan Frawley, Howard Hallett 2	Attendance: 15,000; Referee: S Benson

=== 1914 Auckland v England ===
25 July	Auckland	12–34	England	Auckland Domain
3:00	Try: Charles Savory, Jim Clark; Con: Karl Ifwersen; Pen: Karl Ifwersen 2		Try: Stan Moorhouse 2, Billy Hall, Bert Jenkins, Johnny Rogers, Dick Ramsdale; Con: Alf Wood 5	Attendance: 13,000; Referee: R Benson

=== 1919 Auckland v Australia ===
20 September	Auckland	8–32	Australia	Auckland Domain
3:00	Try: Bill Davidson, Bert Avery; Pen: Karl Ifwersen		Try: Les Cubitt 2, Frank Burge 4, Herbert Gilbert 2 Con: Charles Fraser 2, Ray Norman 2	Attendance: 18,000; Referee: A Ball

=== 1920 Auckland v England ===
24 July	Auckland	24–16	England	Auckland Domain 1
3:00	Try: Bill Cloke, Stan Walters 2, Wally Somers, Penalty Try, Thomas McClymont; Con: Bill Davidson 3		Try: Jonty Parkin 2, Billy Stone, Jim Bacon; Con: Billy Stone, Gwyn Thomas	Attendance: 30,000; Referee: Bill Murray

=== 1922 Auckland v Australian Universities ===
The Australian University team was made up of players from Sydney University and Brisbane University.

21 June	Auckland	12–13	Australian Universities	Carlaw Park 1
3:00	Try: Ivan Littlewood, Nelson Bass; Con: Bill Davidson; Pen: Bill Davidson, Thomas McClymont		Try: WP Lynskey, F Cripps, J Dunworth; Con: H Courtenay; Pen: J Craig	Referee: Bill Murray

=== 1922 Auckland v Australian Universities ===
24 June	Auckland	7–18	Australian Universities	Auckland Domain
3:00	Try: Nelson Bass; Pen: Bill Davidson, Arthur Singe		Try: J Craig, Cunningham, Cripps; Con: J Craig, Courtney	Attendance: 12-15000; Referee: Bert Gallagher

=== 1922 Auckland v Australian Universities ===
28 June	Auckland	24–16	Australian Universities	Carlaw Park 1
3:00	Try: Eric Grey 3, Bert Avery 2, Maurice Wetherill; Con: Bill Davidson 3		Try: J Craig, Lynskey 2, Connaghan; Con: J Craig 2	Referee: Archie Ferguson

=== 1922 Auckland v New South Wales ===
Auckland played the touring New South Wales team in front of 20,000 spectators at the Auckland Domain but was heavily defeated with Australian legend Frank Burge running in 5 tries.

16 September	Auckland	25–40	New South Wales	Auckland Domain
3:00	Try: Bert Avery 2, Ivan Littlewood, Lou Brown 2 Con: Craddock Dufty, Maurice Wetherill; Pen: Craddock Dufty 3		Try: Toohey, Ives, Latta 2, Gray, Frank Burge 5 Con: Horder 2, Frank Burge 3	Attendance: 5,500; Referee: W Murray

=== 1922 Auckland Province v New South Wales ===
A few days after the match with New South Wales an Auckland provincial team took on the touring side. The Auckland team was largely made up of Auckland club players but also included Bill Te Whata who had played in Australia for the New Zealand Māori side, and a handful of others from the Waikato including former Auckland player Tim Peckham. They lost a tight match by 21 points to 20. Frank Burge was ordered off for disputing Wilson's try late in the match.

20 September	Auckland Province	20–21	New South Wales	Auckland Domain 1
3:00	Try: Bert Laing 2, Maurice Wetherill, Billy Wilson; Con: Craddock Dufty, Bill Davidson 2 Pen: Bill Davidson		Try: H Horder, W Toohey 2, B Grey, Frank Burge; Con: H Horder, Frank Burge 2	Attendance: 5500; Referee: Les Bull

=== 1924 Auckland v Australian Universities ===
4 June	Auckland	15–7	Australian Universities	Carlaw Park 1
3:00	Try: George Davidson, Ivan Littlewood 2 Con: Craddock Dufty, Bert Laing; Pen: Craddock Dufty		Try: Barry; Con: Ryan; Pen: Ryan	Attendance: 7000; Referee: Neild

=== 1924 Auckland v Australian Universities ===
7 June	Auckland	17–2	Australian Universities	Carlaw Park 1
3:00	Try: Ben Davidson, McNeil, Nelson Bass; Con: Craddock Dufty 3 Pen: Craddock Dufty		Pen: Ryan	Attendance: 4000; Referee: A Gallagher

=== 1924 Auckland v Australian Universities ===
Frank Delgrosso had to come on the replace George Davidson after he collided badly with teammate Clarrie Polson when they were both going after the ball. Polson received a bad cut over his eye and he also later had to retire and was replaced by Billy Ghent.

14 June	Auckland	14–14	Australian Universities	Carlaw Park 1
3:00	Try: Bert Laing 2, Clarrie Polson, Harry Douglas; Con: Maurice Wetherill		Try: Ryan 2, Frank O'Rourke, Les Halberstater; Con: Dunworth	Attendance: 12,000; Referee: W Ripley

=== 1924 Auckland v England ===
There is film footage of the match taken by Tarr Film and archived on the New Zealand Archive of Film, television and Sound Ngā Taonga website. In scoring on halftime Ben Davidson was knocked out. At the start of the second half Auckland attempted to replace him with Lou Brown who ran out on to the field. However the England captain when seeing this objected as replacements were forbidden in the second half of rugby league matches at this time. Auckland were forced to play with 12 players for a time until Davidson recovered well enough to return to the field.

26 July	Auckland	11–24	England	Carlaw Park 1
3:00	Try: Ben Davidson 2, Nelson Bass; Pen: Craddock Dufty		Try: Johnny Ring 2, Frank Evans, Jack Bennett, Charlie Carr, Stan Whitty; Con: Jonty Parkin 2, Ernest Knapman; Pen: Jonty Parkin	Attendance: 20,000; Referee: Les Bull

=== 1924 Auckland Province v England ===
30 July	Auckland Province	13–28	England	Carlaw Park 1
3:00	Try: Hec Brisbane, B Johnston, Frank Delgrosso; Con: Craddock Dufty; Pen: Craddock Dufty		Try: Ben Gronow, Sid Rix, Tommy Howley 2, Joe Darwell, Jack Price; Con: Ben Gronow 4 Pen: Ben Gronow	Attendance: 7,000; Referee: L Neild

=== 1925 Auckland v Queensland ===
9 September	Auckland	18–18	Queensland	Carlaw Park 1
	Try: Stan Webb, Bert Avery 2, O’Brien; Con: Frank Delgrosso 2 Pen: Frank Delgrosso		Try: Eric Fraunfelder, Cecil Aynsley, Jeff Moores, Herb Steinohrt; Con: Jim Craig 3	Attendance: 6,000; Referee: W Ripley

=== Auckland Province v Queensland ===
10 October	Auckland Province	14–54	Queensland	Carlaw Park 1
3:00	Try: Arthur Singe, Penalty Try; Con: Frank Delgrosso; Pen: Frank Delgrosso 3		Try: Arthur Henderson, Bill Spencer 4, Tom Gorman, Cecil Aynsley 3, James Purcell; Con: Jim Craig 9	Attendance: 9,000; Referee: Les Bull

=== 1928 Auckland Province v England ===
The entire Auckland Provincial team were Auckland club players aside from Joe Menzies.

8 August	Auckland Province	9–14	England	Carlaw Park 1
3:00	Try: Len Scott; Pen: Craddock Dufty 3		Try: Alf Frodsham, Les Fairclough, Emlyn Gwynne, Billo Rees; Con: Walter Gowers	Attendance: 15,000; Referee: Percy Rogers

=== 1928 Auckland v England ===
11 August	Auckland	15–26	England	Carlaw Park 1
3:00	Try: Len Scott, Roy Hardgrave, Alan Clarke; Con: Craddock Dufty 2 Drop: Craddock Dufty		Try: Alf Ellaby, Jim Brough, Alf Frodsham, Billo Rees 2, Harold Bowman; Con: Jim Sullivan 4	Attendance: 25,000; Referee: William Mincham

=== 1932 Auckland v England ===
6 August	Auckland	14–19	England	Carlaw Park 1
3:00	Try: Ben Davidson, Bert Cooke; Con: Alan Clarke; Pen: Alan Clarke 2 Drop: Norm Campbell		Try: Alf Ellaby 2, Artie Atkinson, Gus Risman, S Smith; Con: Jim Sullivan; Pen: Jim Sullivan	Attendance: 15,000; Referee: Percy Rogers

=== 1935 Auckland v Australia (Australian tour match) ===
Australian legend Dave Brown who was renowned for his point scoring feats and was referred to as "the Bradman of league" scored 10 of Australia's 16 points. This was the first match Australia had played in New Zealand since their 1919 tour.

21 September	Auckland	8-16	Australia	Carlaw Park 1
3:00	Try: Ted Mincham, Bill Telford; Pen: Ted Mincham		Try: Dave Brown 2, Frank Curran, Jim Gibbs; Con: Dave Brown; Pen: Dave Brown	Attendance: 15,000; Referee: Maurice Wetherill

=== 1935 Auckland Province v Australia (Australian tour match) ===
9 October	Auckland Province	18-36	Australia	Carlaw Park 1
3:00	Try: Eric Fletcher, Harold Tetley; Con: Eric Fletcher; Pen: Eric Fletcher 5		Try: Ray Hines, Laurie Ward, Bill Mahon, Edward Collins 3, Jim Gibbs 2 Con: Ross McKinnon 6	Referee: Wilfred Simpson

=== 1936 Auckland v England ===
The Auckland team had been selected by Bert Avery and coached by Bert Cooke. Auckland competed well against a very strong England team before going down 22–16. Walter Cuthbert donated a trophy (a cap) for the best Auckland player which was selected by an Mr. R.F. Anderton, the touring teams co-manager as being Steve Watene. It was presented to him at the Auckland annual prize giving in November.

25 July	Auckland	16-22	England	Carlaw Park 1
3:00	Try: Lou Brown, J Breed; Con: Steve Watene 2 Pen: Steve Watene 3		Try: Alan Edwards 3, Gus Risman, Barney Hudson, Emlyn Jenkins; Con: Gus Risman	Attendance: 14,000; Referee: Maurice Wetherill

1946

- Auckland 18, Australia 36 (Carlaw Park)

1949

- Auckland 18, Australia 36 (Carlaw Park)

1953

- Auckland 4 Australia 26 (Carlaw Park)

1954

- Auckland 5 Great Britain 4

1955

- Auckland 17 France 15

1960

- Auckland 14 France 5

1961

- Auckland 13 Australia 8 (Carlaw Park)

1962

- Auckland 46 Great Britain 13

1965

- Auckland 2 Australia 18 (Carlaw Park)

1969

- Auckland 15 Australia 14 (Carlaw Park)

1971

- Auckland 15 Australia 14 (Carlaw Park)

1974

- Auckland 11 Great Britain 2

1975

- Auckland 6 Australia 17 (Carlaw Park)
- Auckland 9 France 3 (Carlaw Park)

1977

- Auckland 19 Australia 15 (Carlaw Park)
- Auckland 17 France 0
- Auckland 14 Great Britain 10

1980

- Auckland 7 Australia 21 (Carlaw Park)

1981

- Auckland 20 France 10

1985

- Auckland 10 Australia 50 (Carlaw Park)

1988

- Auckland 30 Great Britain 14

1989

- Auckland 26 Australia 24 (Carlaw Park)

1990

- Auckland 24 Great Britain 13

=== New South Wales results ===
- 1974 Amco Cup – 1 loss (round 2)
- 1975 Amco Cup – 1 win, 1 draw, 1 loss (semi-finals)
- 1976 Amco Cup – 1 win, 1 loss (round 2)
- 1977 Amco Cup – 1 loss (round 1)
- 1978 Amco Cup – 1 win, 1 loss (quarter-finals)
- 1979 Amco Cup – 3 losses (group stage)
- 1980 Tooth Cup – 1 loss (round 1)
- 1984 National Panasonic Cup – 1 loss (preliminary round)
- 1985 National Panasonic Cup – 1 loss (round 1)
- 2007 NSWRL Premier League (Auckland Lions)
- 2008 New South Wales Cup (Auckland Vulcans)
- 2009 New South Wales Cup (Auckland Vulcans)
- 2010 New South Wales Cup (Auckland Vulcans)
- 2011 New South Wales Cup (Auckland Vulcans)

=== Other matches ===
1949, Auckland Colts 16 Australia 30 (Carlaw Park) 1984, Auckland 16 Great Britain 14 (Carlaw Park)

== Auckland representative record by year and decade ==
This does not include matches by Auckland Province which typically had players from the Waikato region in the early decades as it was a sub-union of Auckland. It also does not include matches by or between Auckland Pākehā and Auckland Māori.

Season	Played	W	D	L	PF	PA	PD	Opponents
1908	4	2	1	1	53	50	+3	v Wellington (x2), Taranaki (x2)
1909	4	2	0	2	74	55	+19	v New Zealand Māori, Taranaki (x2), Wellington
1908-09	8	4	1	3	127	105	+22	
1910	10	9	0	1	250	167	+83	v Rotorua, Great Britain, Auckland B, Wanganui, Bluff, Southland, Otago/Southland, Nelson, Hawke's Bay, Dannevirke
1911	9	8	0	1	198	109	+89	v New Zealand (x2), Wellington, Lower Waikato, Hawke's Bay, Nelson, Taranaki, Hawke's Bay Māori, Waihi/Rotorua
1912	9	6	0	3	163	107	+56	v Thames/Goldfields, New Zealand, Hawke's Bay, Rotorua, Wellington, Waikato, New Zealand Māori, New South Wales (x2)
1913	10	7	0	3	189	142	+47	v Waikato Country, Taranaki (x2), Hawke's Bay, Nelson, Canterbury, North Shore Albions, Wellington (x2), New South Wales
1914	4	3	0	1	86	54	+32	v England, Waikato, Taranaki, Wellington
1915	3	1	0	2	46	60	-14	v Thames (x2), Lower Waikato
1916	0	0	0	0	0	0	0	No matches played due to the war
1917	1	1	0	0	23	20	+3	v Military Camps
1918	1	1	0	0	45	9	+35	v Canterbury
1919	4	1	0	3	89	96	-7	v New Zealand, Returned Soldiers, Hawke's Bay, Australia
1910-19	51	37	0	14	1089	764	+325	
1920	2	2	0	0	78	16	+62	v Rest of New Zealand, England
1921	9	7	0	2	270	126	+144	v New Zealand, Wellington (x2), Hawke's Bay, King Country, South Auckland (x2), West Coast, Canterbury
1922	10	4	0	6	253	222	+31	v New Zealand Māori, Australian Universities (x3), Cambridge, Hawke's Bay, South Auckland (x2), New South Wales (x2), Bay of Plenty
1923	5	4	1	0	192	74	+118	v Wellington, Hamilton, South Auckland (x2), Auckland Province
1924	5	2	1	2	62	68	-6	v Australian Universities (x3), England, South Auckland
1925	5	2	1	2	104	110	-6	v New Zealand (x2), South Auckland (x2), Queensland
1926	6	5	0	1	194	102	+92	v South Auckland (x2), Rest of New Zealand, New Zealand, Otago, Canterbury
1927	7	7	0	0	240	130	+110	v New Zealand (Auckland members only), Canterbury, West Coast, Otago, Wellington, Buller, South Auckland
1928	7	4	0	3	202	126	+76	v South Auckland (x3), Canterbury, England, Otago, North Auckland
1929	3	3	0	0	80	45	+35	v South Auckland, Northland, Canterbury
1920-29	59	40	3	16	1675	1019	+656	
1930	3	1	0	2	60	63	-3	v Northland, South Auckland, New Zealand
1931	1	0	1	0	19	19	0	v Northland
1932	3	2	0	1	78	40	38	v South Auckland, England, South Auckland
1933	7	6	0	1	177	108	+69	v Taranaki (x2), South Auckland (x2), North Auckland, West Coast, Hawke's Bay
1934	3	3	0	0	89	36	+53	v Taranaki, Northland, South Auckland
1935	6	5	0	1	172	95	+77	v Taranaki, Auckland B, Wellington, West Coast, Canterbury, Australia
1936	2	1	0	1	41	44	-3	v Wellington, England
1937	3	2	0	1	74	65	+9	v South Auckland, Taranaki, New Zealand Māori
1938	3	3	0	0	116	49	+67	v Rest of New Zealand, New Zealand, Canterbury
1939	2	2	0	0	49	26	+23	v South Auckland, Wellington
1930-39	33	25	1	7	875	545	+330	
1940	0	0	0	0	0	0	0	No matches were played by Auckland. Auckland Māori and Auckland Pākēha teams did play matches.
1941	2	2	0	0	51	29	+22	v South Auckland (x2)
1942	1	1	0	0	49	16	+33	v South Auckland
1943	2	0	0	1	26	50	-26	v South Auckland (x2)
1944	2	1	0	1	46	17	+29	v South Auckland (x2)
1945	5	5	0	0	173	51	+122	v South Auckland (x2), Wellington (x2), West Coast
1908-45	163	116	4	43	4,109	2,586	+1,523	

== Record by Opponent from 1908 to 1945 ==
Opponent	Played	W	D	L	PF	PA	PD
Auckland B	2	2	0	0	71	25	46
Auckland Province	1	1	0	0	44	15	29
Australia	2	0	0	2	24	40	-16
Australian Universities	6	3	1	2	89	70	+19
Bay of Plenty	1	1	0	0	33	26	+7
Bluff	1	1	0	0	42	12	+30
Buller	1	1	0	0	60	33	+27
Cambridge	1	1	0	0	73	29	+44
Canterbury	9	9	0	0	356	142	+214
Dannevirke	1	1	0	0	24	8	+16
England	6	1	0	5	92	141	-49
Great Britain	1	0	0	1	9	52	-43
Hawke's Bay	8	8	0	0	222	80	+142
Hawke's Bay Māori	1	1	0	0	22	10	+12
Hamilton	1	1	0	0	22	16	+6
King Country	1	1	0	0	58	25	+33
Lower Waikato	3	2	0	1	77	49	+28
Military Camps	1	1	0	0	23	20	+3
New South Wales	4	1	0	3	39	95	-56
New Zealand	10	3	0	7	202	240	-38
New Zealand (Auckland members)	1	1	0	0	24	21	3
New Zealand Māori	4	2	0	2	90	91	-1
Nelson	3	3	0	0	76	27	+49
North Shore Albions	1	1	0	0	14	13	+1
Northland	6	5	1	0	142	88	+54
Otago	3	3	0	0	76	39	+37
Otago-Southland	1	1	0	0	30	18	+12
Queensland	1	0	1	0	18	18	0
Rest of New Zealand	3	2	0	1	142	42	+100
Returned Soldiers WW1	1	0	0	1	24	26	-2
Rotorua	2	2	0	0	31	27	+4
South Auckland (northern Waikato)	32	20	1	10	743	468	+275
Southland	1	1	0	0	17	12	+5
Taranaki	13	10	0	3	310	159	+151
Thames-Goldfields	1	1	0	0	12	18	-6
Thames	2	1	0	1	40	41	-1
Waihi-Rotorua	1	1	0	0	20	10	+10
Waikato	2	2	0	0	70	10	+60
Waikato Country	1	1	0	0	10	8	+2
Whanganui	1	1	0	0	15	14	+1
West Coast	5	5	0	0	157	65	+92
Wellington	17	14	1	2	466	253	+253
Total	163	116	4	43	4,109	2,586	+1,523

== Auckland Māori v Auckland Pākehā ==
In 1936 the first ever match was played between Auckland Pākehā and Auckland Māori. It became an annual fixture thanks largely to the efforts of the Manukau club which successfully recruited brilliant Māori footballers from around the Auckland region and much of the North Island. Some of those players included Jack Hemi, Angus Gault, Frank Pickrang, Jack Brodrick, Tommy Chase, Jack Broughton, Tame Kawe, Pita Ririnui, George Nepia, Jim Murray, Aubrey Thompson, George Shilton and many others.

=== 1936 ===
23 June	Auckland (Pākehā)	21-30	Tāmaki (Auckland Māori)	Carlaw Park 1
3:00	Try: John Anderson 3, Arthur Kay, Harold Tetley; Con: Ted Mincham 2, John Anderson		Try: Mahima, A Nathan, Frank Pickrang, P Minnix 2, Steve Watene; Con: Steve Watene 5 Pen: Steve Watene	Referee: Maurice Wetherill

=== 1937 ===
12 May	Auckland (Pākehā)	24-14	Auckland Māori (Tāmaki)	Carlaw Park 1
3:00	Try: Gordon Midgley, Arthur Kay 2, Wally Tittleton, W Breed 2 Con: George Tittleton 2, W Stockley		Try: Jack Tawhai, Jack Brodrick; Con: Steve Watene; Pen: Steve Watene 2 Drop: Jack Hemi

=== 1938 ===
6 June	Auckland Māori (Tamaki)	26-21	Auckland Pākehā	Carlaw Park 1
3:00	Try: J Wilson 2, Noel Bickerton, Peter Mahima, Pita Ririnui, Martin Hansen; Con: Tom Chase 3 Pen: Tom Chase		Try: A Duncan, Ted Mincham, Walker, Bert Leatherbarrow, Petersen; Con: Verdun Scott, Ted Mincham 2	Referee: S Billman

=== 1939 ===
5 June	Auckland Māori	19-15	Auckland Pakeha	Carlaw Park 1
3:00	Try: Jack Hemi 2, Jack Brodrick; Con: Bruce Donaldson 2 Pen: Bruce Donaldson 2, Jack Hemi		Try: Roy Nurse, Arthur McInnarney, Bob Banham; Con: Des Herring, Verdun Scott; Pen: Verdun Scott	Referee: S Billman

30 September	Auckland Pākehā	15-12	Tāmaki (Auckland Māori)	Carlaw Park 1
3:00	Try: Basil Cranch, Roy Nurse, Des Herring; Con: Claude Dempsey, Des Herring; Pen: J Cato		Try: Bruce Donaldson, Steve Watene; Con: George Nepia; Pen: George Nepia, Bruce Donaldson	Referee: O Chalmers

=== 1940 ===
8 June	Auckland Māori	7–10	Auckland Pākehā	Carlaw Park 1
3:00	Try: W Butler; Pen: Tom Chase, Bruce Donaldson		Try: Arthur Kay, Bob Banham; Pen: Arthur Kay; Drop: Verdun Scott	Attendance: 6000; Referee: J Hawkes

31 August	Auckland Māori	6–27	Auckland Pākehā	Carlaw Park 1
3:00	Pen: Jack Hemi 3		Try: Jack Smith 2, Arthur Kay 2, Bob Banham, Harold Milliken 2 Pen: Jack Smith 3	Attendance: 5000; Referee: S Billman

=== 1941 ===
20 September	Auckland Māori	21-17	Auckland Pākehā	Carlaw Park 1
3:00	Try: Gregory 3, W Butler, George Mitchell; Con: Jack Hemi 3		Try: Brian Riley 3, W Jackson, Clarrie Peterson; Con: Bob Scott	Attendance: 6000; Referee: J Hawkes

=== 1942 ===
29 August	Auckland Māori	10-8	Auckland Pākehā	Carlaw Park 1
3:00	Try: W Butler, Aubrey Thompson; Con: Jack Hemi 2		Try: W Kinney, Arthur Kay; Con: Alan Donovan	Referee: J Hawkes

28 September	Auckland Māori	23-23	Auckland Pākehā	Carlaw Park 1
3:00	Try: Steve Watene, Pita Ririnui, Aubrey Thompson 2, George Shilton; Con: Jack Hemi 4		Try: W Kinney, Williams, Arthur Kay, L Davis, Dick Hull; Con: Arthur Kay 2 Pen: Arthur Kay 2	Referee: Lieutenant J Donovan

=== 1943 ===
4 September	Auckland Pākehā	13-13	Auckland Māori	Carlaw Park 1
3:00	Try: W Kinney, Don McLeod, Field; Con: Warwick Clarke; Pen: Warwick Clarke		Try: A Taumata, Jim Murray, Aubrey Thompson; Con: Jack Hemi; Drop: Ralph Martin	Referee: S Billman

=== 1944 ===
9 September	Auckland Māori	18-13	Auckland Pākēha	Carlaw Park 1
3:00	Try: A Tumata 2, A Rogers, F Hilton; Con: James Silva 2 Pen: James Silva		Try: L Clement, N Johnson, Travers Hardwick; Con: A Jones, Jack Magill	Referee: H Tate

=== 1945 ===
30 June	Auckland Pākehā	19-16	Auckland Māori	Carlaw Park 1
3:00	Try: Allan Wiles, Brian Nordgren, Don McLeod; Con: Brian Nordgren 3 Pen: Brian Nordgren 2		Try: George Mitchell, Pita Ririnui; Con: Silva 2 Pen: Silva 3	Referee: Stuart Billman

== See also ==
- Rugby league in New Zealand
