= Otago rugby league team =

New Zealand regional sports team

Otago Rugby League Team
Club information
- Nickname(s): Whalers, Raiders, Storm, 45er's
- Founded: 1908

Current details
- Coach: David Reedy
- Manager: Mel Piri
- Captain: Ricki Allan
- Competition: New Zealand Rugby League

Records
- Rugby League Cup: 2002
- South Island Premiership: 2017, 2018, 2019, 2020
- NZRL National Championship Runners Up: 2018, 2019, 2020

The Otago Rugby League Team are New Zealand rugby league team that represents the Otago Rugby League. They are known as the Whalers. In the past they have been nicknamed the Storm, the Raiders and the 45er's.

== History ==
In 1908 Otago was involved in some of the first provincial matches in the country when it played a home and away series against Southland. The first game was played at Caledonia Ground in Dunedin on 3 October and used goalposts which were rented from the Otago Rugby Union. The Southland side included Ned Hughes, a former All Black. Otago won the match 11–8. A return match was played at Queens Park, Invercargill on 7 October. Southland was able to win the match 30–14 and draw the series.

The Otago side was made up of fullback D Bannantyne, three-quarters J Harrhy, WR Kirk and G Ogg, five-eighths EO Nees and P Walker, halfback J Coulter, and forwards J Bryant, E Manley (captain), T Mockford, W Harridge, J Campbell and Larkins.

Although rugby league was played in Southland over the next two years, the code largely ceased to exist in Otago. An Auckland team toured New Zealand in 1910 playing seven matches including one against a combined Otago/Southland team on the Caledonian Ground. Auckland won the match by 30 points to 18 before a crowd of 1,500. Rugby league in the area was revived again in 1924, following the announcement by the New Zealand Rugby League that a Test was to be held in Dunedin that year. After securing a ground literally only days before the Test, due to blockades at different venues by the Otago Rugby Football Union, the Test went ahead at Tahuna Park in front of more than 14,000 spectators. The ORFU tried to sway the public away from the game and arranged a provincial Otago-Canterbury match at the same time. However the public sympathy went to the fledgling code and with it came the formation of the Otago Rugby Football League that year, chaired by Dunedin dentist, John Cooper.

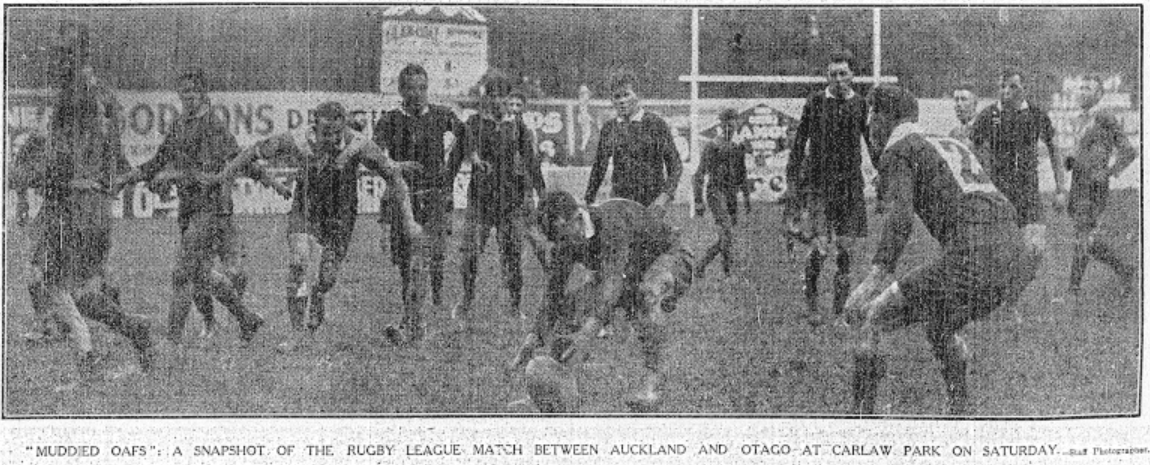

In 1926 Otago embarked on a northern tour and they played a match against the Auckland side at Carlaw Park on August 7 who only one week earlier had beaten the full New Zealand side 52–32 before their departure for England. Otago played well in their 14–4 loss. Otago then travelled south to Hamilton where they played the South Auckland team which would now be better known as Waikato on August 11. They won by 30 points to 12 over the local side at Hinemoa Park, Hamilton. In 1927 Auckland toured again and played Otago at the Caledonian Ground on September 17. Auckland won the match 20–13 before a crowd of 2,000.

Until the stock market crashed in 1929, the ORFL had become one of the most powerful league provincial bodies in New Zealand after its leading administrator Harry Divers founded the Art Union lottery leading to an abundance of wealth. Subsequently, the ORFL bought up a big section of land in South Dunedin, which was later subdivided, including a ground originally called Colossal Park after one of the lotteries. It soon became known as Tonga Park, which remains to this day. The ORFL also loaned the NZRL 820 pounds in 1927 to keep it out of the red as well as hosting a Test the following year at the Caledonian Ground, which by now was under a five-year lease of the code. In addition there were five clubs (Athletic, Christian Brothers, City, Kaikorai and Kaitangita) that began and in the case of Kaikorai and Kaitangita were only short lived.

As a provincial team, Otago was a strong side and proved to be a strong rival against its fellow South Island provincial teams West Coast and Canterbury. Four local players – Bert Eckhoff (1928), Herbert Pearce (1930), Harry Thomas (1925) and Alf Townsend (1928) all became New Zealand representatives, while others such as Gordon Blazey, Ted McKewen and brothers, John and Tom O'Connor played for the South Island against the North Island. After four glorious years, the turning point for the ORFL began in 1928 when the test at the Caledonian Ground was marred by fighting by the New Zealand and English teams, causing wide negative press in the local media. The following year the share market crashed causing local players to relocate outside Dunedin in search of work. Perhaps the biggest tragedy came in 1931 when Divers died. A most popular man who had been involved in other sports in Dunedin, Divers had held all of the main roles within the ORFL at one stage or another – President, Secretary and Treasurer, in addition to being responsible for keeping a high profile of the game in Dunedin. Falling playing numbers saw the ORFL go into recess in 1934.

After 19 years of no league in Dunedin, a Christian Brothers club reunion in 1952 together with radio interviews between broadcaster Ray Cody and former Halifax player and one time Maori All Black, Enoka Macdonald, helped to reform the ORFL the following year. A large board of control (which was chaired by Cody) together with a schoolboys board (led by the future ORFL Life Member George Stuart) and a Referees Association along with four clubs – Athletic, Caledonian, Celtic and Western Suburbs all started up in the first year. The following year in 1954 saw the beginning of New Zealand's first University rugby league club along with the Kia Toa Club. Both 1953 and 1954 saw the South Island play in Dunedin against international touring team and together with a renewed interest, the ORFL also like their 1920s counterpart was able to secure a five-year lease on a ground as its headquarters. In this case it was the scene of the 1924 Test match, Tahuna Park. A year later in September 1955 Celtic played Athletic under lights at Tahuna Park and in doing so created history by becoming the first ever rugby league match in New Zealand to do so.

The ORFL gained a further three Kiwis over the next decade in Jimmy Haig (1947), John Walshe (1965) and Trevor Patrick (1969). In 1966 the first televised league match in Dunedin was held when Otago played the West Coast at the Caledonian Ground and two years later, the ORFL hosted a national Quarangular tournament between home side Otago along with Canterbury, West Coast and Wellington.

The arrival of ex Auckland (Ashley McEwen) and West Coast players (Des Adamson) in Dunedin in the mid 1970s helped Otago win a provincial tournament in Palmerston North in 1975. The following year rugby league began in Southland for the first time since 1910 when the Invercargill-based Leopards Club began to compete in the Otago competition. Two years later, the ORFL now became known as the Otago-Southland Rugby League and soon the clubs from the deep south began to take control over their more northern rivals. The amalgamation between the two provinces was separated in 1985, so that it once again became the ORFL. In 1993 an Otago Invitation side, including Mark Elia and Francis Leota, played New Zealand Māori. The Māori won 39–18.

In 1995 Otago recorded their first win over Canterbury in 35 years. In 1998 Otago defeated West Coast for the first time since 1927. They went on to make the final of the National Provincial Competition Second Division before losing 56–10 to the Bay of Plenty. Another triumph that year was having primary, intermediate and secondary school competitions run that year.

Otago won the Rugby League Cup in 2002 when they defeated Tasman on 8 September. Otago continued to hold the cup for another three years before losing to a Midlands side in the North Island. Dwindling playing numbers caused the ORFL to go into recess for the third time in 2008, before it re-emerged again in 2010. Just before it went into recess Otago won a centenary match against Southland in 2008, defeating them 64–4. In 2014, four clubs play league in Dunedin, which includes Kia Toa and University, both of whom celebrate their 60th anniversary years, during this season.
