= Southland rugby league team =

New Zealand rugby league team

Club information
- Nickname: Rams
- Founded: 1908

Current details
- Competition: New Zealand Rugby League

The Southland rugby league team are New Zealand rugby league team that represents the Southland Rugby League. In the past they have been nicknamed the Rams.

== History ==
In 1908 Southland was involved in some of the first provincial matches in the country when it played a home and away series against Otago. The first game was played at Caledonia Ground in Dunedin on 3 October and used goalposts which were rented from the Otago Rugby Union. The Southland side included Ned Hughes, a former All Black. Otago won the match 11-8. A return match was played at Queens Park, Invercargill on 7 October. Southland was able to win the match 30-14 and draw the series.

In 1998 Southland recorded its first ever win over the West Coast.

In 2010 former Southland Stags player Iona Sipa switched codes and represented the Rams.

A home and away series will be held in 2011 between Canterbury, Tasman, the West Coast, Otago and Southland.
