= Chinese Laundry (disambiguation) =

Chinese Laundry is a historic building in San Diego, California, US.

Chinese Laundry may also refer to:

- Chinese laundry, services provided by Chinese immigrants in the Americas in the late 19th and early 20th centuries
- Chinese Laundry, a historic building in Bodie, California, US
- Chinese Laundry, a building demolished in the 1911 Torreón massacre
- "Chinese Laundry", a diorama created by Frank Wong

== See also ==
- Chinese Hand Laundry Alliance, a North American labour union
- "Chinese Laundry Blues", a 1932 Jack Cottrell song
- In a Chinese Laundry, an 1897 comedy film
