= Jorge Farjat =

Argentine audiovisual artist and theorist (born 1950)

Jorge Luis Farjat (born 17 September 1950) is an Argentine producer of audiovisual and literary works and the originator of a formal theory of audiovisual art. Born in San Martín de los Andes, Buenos Aires Province, he has created twenty-six medium- and feature-length productions, predominantly documentaries, spanning six creative periods between 1976 and 2015. His literary output comprises seventeen volumes in the Colección Arte y Memoria Audiovisual, covering audiovisual theory, immigration history, and art theory. Among his most notable books are Migraciones y supervivencia (Migrations and Survival: Main Excerpts) and La crisis y deshumanización del arte en el siglo XX: Su manifestación en la música (The Crisis and Dehumanization of Art in the 20th Century: Its Representation in Music).

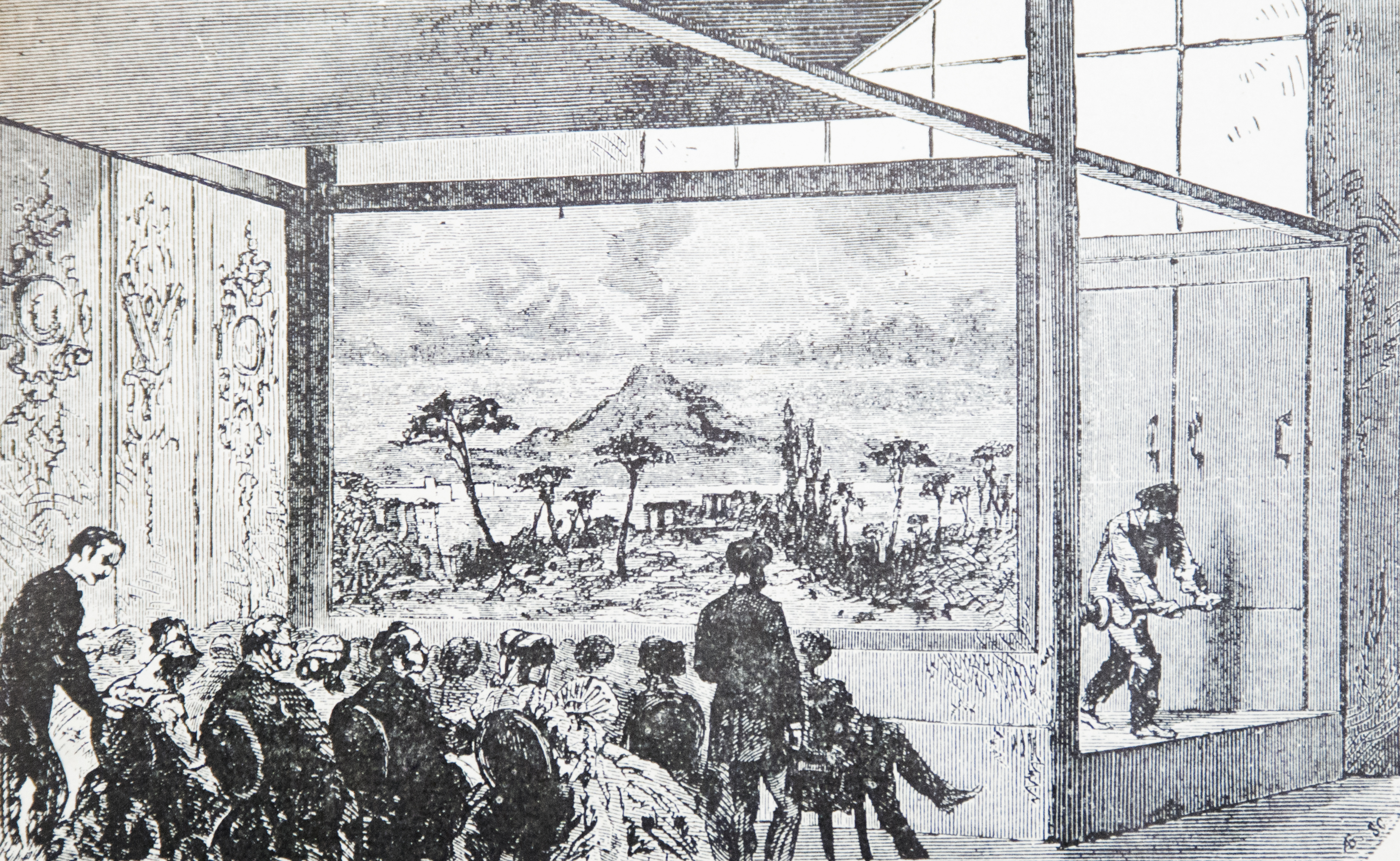
Diorama of Louis Daguerre and Charles Marie Bouton (1822), a historical antecedent of audiovisual art predating cinema, along with the magic lantern (1660). The curtains painted with overlapping landscapes offered audiences successive and changing images inside a darkened chamber, accompanied by natural sound effects. Its principles of action, development, and conclusion — along with the dissolve transition from one image to the next — anticipate the defining characteristics of contemporary audiovisual art: photographs shown with lap dissolves synchronized with sound in articulated montage.

== Biography ==
Jorge Luis Farjat was born on 17 September 1950 in San Martín de los Andes, in the province of Buenos Aires. He studied classical music and cinema, coming into contact with various scholars during his secondary and tertiary education. After completing coursework in Communication Sciences at the Universidad del Salvador, he began the academic study of audiovisual production.

In the early 1970s, Farjat met Martín Gerber Bufano (1921–1986), an Argentine philosopher, musician, and teacher, through Radio Nacional. Bufano's philosophical thought — particularly his engagement with the ideas of Edward Carpenter — became a lasting influence on Farjat's aesthetic and theoretical outlook.

Following his audiovisual and literary productions between 1978 and 2015, Farjat synthesized the principles of his theory in the book Los niveles de la experiencia estética, sinopsis y antología de los principios de la teoría (The Levels of the Aesthetic Experience: Synopsis and Anthology of the Theory's Principles), published in early 2016.

== Audiovisual theory ==
Farjat's foundational theoretical premise is that audiovisual art constitutes a distinct form of social communication and expression, separate from cinema, television, and related media. This position was first articulated in Audiovisualogía: El audiovisual como arte y medio de comunicación (Buenos Aires, 1979), which established the audiovisual work as an autonomous artistic and communicative form.

Farjat's works are characterized by the use of a visual image language accompanied throughout by music drawn from the polyphonic, classical, Romantic, and post-Romantic repertoires. Over time, his montage theory evolved to distinguish between intrinsic and extrinsic narrative formats, with the lap dissolve playing a structurally significant role in linking images. A supplementary theoretical essay, El audiovisual y las artes (The Audiovisual Theme and the Arts), which situates audiovisual art within a hierarchy of artistic forms according to aesthetic psychology, was published in 2015.

== Audiovisual works ==
=== First period (1976–1979) ===
The first period includes El Arte de Vivir (The Art of Living), the trilogy Hacia las Regiones del Sol (Toward the Regions of the Sun), El Mundo Estelar (The Starry World), and Indicios de Inmortalidad (Intimations of Immortality). These works consist of image language accompanied exclusively by music, though El Arte de Vivir also exhibits semi-documentary characteristics. Their literary inspiration draws primarily on Edward Carpenter and William Wordsworth. This period coincides with the initial publication of Audiovisualogía (1979), disseminating Farjat's emerging theory of audiovisual art.

Title	English title	Year	Duration
El Arte de Vivir	The Art of Living	1975–1976	100 min
Hacia las Regiones del Sol (Trilogía)	Toward the Regions of the Sun (Trilogy)	1976–1977	240 min
El Mundo Estelar	The Starry World	1977–1978	80 min
Indicios de Inmortalidad	Intimations of Immortality	1977	80 min

=== Second period (1989–1993) ===
The second period marks Farjat's turn toward the documentary genre, incorporating historical and testimonial content into the montage methods developed in the first period. While rooted in first-person historical narrative, these works retain a significant proportion — often half or more of their total running time — of the music-and-image style of the earlier works. Beginning with Memorias del Hospital de Inmigrantes, the works operate across three distinct levels: the documentary level (historical-testimonial context), the formal level (purely aesthetic concerns), and a third, philosophically inflected level elaborated in Farjat's literary essays.

Title	English title	Year	Duration
Los Antiguos Hoteles de Inmigrantes	The Old Immigrants' Hotels	1989	33 min
Memorias del Hospital de Inmigrantes	Memories of the Immigrants' Hospital	1990	90 min
Las Edades en el Viento	Ages in the Wind	1991	30 min
El Sendero de las Luces (Historia de Liebig)	Path of Lights (History of Liebig)	1991	60 min
Memorias de la Colonia San José	Memories from the San José Colony	1993	45 min
El Enigma de las Grandes Voces	The Enigma of the Great Voices	1991–1993	90 min

=== Third period (1993–1998) ===
The third period represents a pivotal aesthetic shift, producing a new framework of montage that required Farjat to develop the principles set forth in Audiovisualogía at considerably greater depth. The six years of this cycle produced a new body of works collected under the title La Exhalación de la Tierra (The Exhalation of the Earth), comprising fourteen works. Several function as metaphorical expressions of Carpenter's thought: Preludio (Prelude) addresses degrees of consciousness, while El Encuentro de la Luz (The Encounter with Light) engages with Carpenter's chapter on the creation and materialization of forms in The Drama of Love and Death (London, 1912). The works of this period are developed primarily in the music-and-image style of the first period, though with a strong documentary dimension. The period concludes in 1998 with La Creación: Historia de Svea (The Creation: History of Svea), which integrates fourteen intrinsic and extrinsic narrative formats of montage into a progressively articulated structure.

Title	English title
La Exhalación de la Tierra (series)	The Exhalation of the Earth (series)
El Gran Hogar	The Great Home
La Cuesta Morada	The Purple Slope
Hornos de las Bajas Luces I y II	Low Light Furnaces I and II
La Común Unión	The Common Union
El Son de Badajo	The Melody of the Clapper
Hornos en Lejanos Ponientes	Furnaces in Distant Dusks
Luces en la Cresta	Lights at the Summit
El Llamado en el Camino	The Call along the Road
Las Líneas y las Sombras	The Lines and the Shadows
El Encuentro de la Luz	The Encounter with Light
Evocaciones a la Vera de los Senderos	Evocations along the Edge of the Trails
El Eterno Anhelo	The Infinite Yearning
Preludio Farjat	Prelude
Largo Final	Long Finale
La Creación (Historia de Svea)	The Creation (History of Svea)

=== Fourth period (1999–2007) ===
Through the illustrated literary essay Migraciones y Supervivencia (Migrations and Survival: Main Excerpts), Farjat brought together the full range of philosophical principles informing his audiovisual work. He continued during this period to produce works for the La Exhalación de la Tierra series. Three works from this period were digitally remastered between 2013 and 2014:

Title	English title	Duration	Digital version
La Exhalación de la Tierra: Preludio	The Exhalation of the Earth: Prelude	49 min	2013
El Encuentro de la Luz	The Encounter with Light	40 min	2014
El Eterno Anhelo	The Infinite Yearning	38 min	2014

=== Fifth period (2007–2014) ===
The fifth period opens with Solar de Arte y Memoria Audiovisual (Solar of Audiovisual Art and Memory), a documentary work accompanied by a literary essay of the same name, reflecting on the architectural project Farjat designed and built according to the same aesthetic and philosophical principles that govern his audiovisual output. The Solar subsequently became a museum and library. This period is defined in part by the transition to digital media, including the conversion and reprography of works from earlier periods to high-definition formats. New works adopted the 16:9 aspect ratio alongside the classical 4:3. The period concludes with Autumn Song (Light and Color Steeped of Yellow) (2014) and the digital remastering of El Eterno Anhelo.

Title	English title	Year	Duration
Solar de Arte y Memoria Audiovisual	Solar of Audiovisual Art and Memory	2007	30 min
Luz del Azul	Light from the Blue	2011	14 min
Una Voz sobre la Tierra (Parts 1 & 2)	A Voice over the Earth (Parts 1 & 2)	2013	100 min
Life Steeped by Shades of Red	—	2013–2014	41 min
Autumn Song (Light and Color Steeped of Yellow)	—	2014	23 min

=== Sixth period (2015– ) ===
The sixth period is marked by a significant shift in Farjat's approach to extrinsic montage. He moved away from what he terms the "extrinsic association point due to the lap dissolve understood as free will" toward a new formal precision elaborated in his concurrent theoretical writings. The period opens with several works derived from documentary material captured the previous year and concludes the trilogy Una Voz sobre la Tierra with its third part. In July 2015, Farjat published El audiovisual y las artes, proposing an aesthetic hierarchy of the arts grounded in aesthetic psychology. The period's theoretical capstone is Los niveles de la experiencia estética: sinopsis y antología de los principios de la teoría (2016).

Title	English title	Year	Duration
El Jardín Secreto: Lo Imperceptible en Invierno	The Secret Garden: The Imperceptible in Winter	2015	20 min
The Great Dawn	—	2015	14 min
Una Voz sobre la Tierra (Part 3)	A Voice over the Earth (Part 3)	2015	32 min
Spring Music	—	2015	27 min

=== Technical formats ===
All works are available on Full HD digital support (1080p) in the 16:9 aspect ratio and are in the process of conversion to 4K resolution. Works originally produced on 35 mm color reversal film (First through Fourth periods) have been digitalized and remastered accordingly.

== Literary works ==
=== Collaborative works with Graciela Swiderski ===
- La Inmigración (The Immigration). Buenos Aires, 1st ed. 1999. ISBN 987-97373-0-X
- La Inmigración: Historia Ilustrada y Memoria Audiovisual / Los Antiguos Hoteles de Inmigrantes (The Immigration: Illustrated History and Audiovisual Memory / The Old Immigrants' Hotels). Buenos Aires, 2nd ed. 2001. ISBN 987-97373-1-8
- Los Antiguos Hoteles de Inmigrantes (The Old Immigrants' Hotels). Buenos Aires, 1st ed. 2000. ISBN 987-43-0769-2
- Los Viajes y Arribos (Voyages and Arrivals). Buenos Aires, 2nd ed. 2003. ISBN 987-97373-3-4

=== Individual works ===
- Audiovisualogía: El audiovisual como arte y medio de comunicación (Audiovisualogy: The Audiovisual as Art and Means of Communication). Buenos Aires, 1st ed. 1979. ISBN 950-43-3879-8
- Obra Audiovisual: Selección Iconográfica (Audiovisual Work: Iconographic Selection). Buenos Aires, 1st ed. 2002. ISBN 987-43-5311-2
- Citas y Testimonios: El Audiovisual como Arte. Identificación de Obras (Quotations and Testimonials: The Audiovisual as Art. Identification of Works). Buenos Aires, 1st ed. 2002. ISBN 987-43-5312-0
- Migraciones y Supervivencia: Principales Extractos (Migrations and Survival: Main Excerpts). Buenos Aires, 1st ed. 2002. ISBN 987-43-5310-4
- Obras Varias (one volume, including Obra Audiovisual, Migraciones y Supervivencia, and Citas y Testimonios). Buenos Aires, 1st ed. 2003. ISBN 987-97373-2-6
- Teoría Audiovisual (Audiovisual Theory). Buenos Aires, 1st ed. 2004, 2nd ed. ISBN 987-43-6843-8
- Teoría y Obra Audiovisual (Audiovisual Work and Theory). Buenos Aires, 1st ed. 2004. ISBN 987-43-6844-6
- Solar de Arte y Memoria Audiovisual (Solar of Audiovisual Art and Memory). Buenos Aires, 1st ed. 2008. ISBN 978-987-97373-5-4
- La crisis y deshumanización del arte en el siglo XX: su manifestación en la música (The Crisis and Dehumanization of Art in the 20th Century: Its Representation in Music). Buenos Aires, 1st ed. 2011, 2nd ed. 2015.
- El Audiovisual y las Artes (The Audiovisual Theme and the Arts). Buenos Aires, 1st ed. 2015. ISBN 978-987-33-8138-6. Declared of cultural interest by the Buenos Aires Province Government. Res. 22.
- La música en la crisis y deshumanización del arte contemporáneo (Music in the Crisis and Dehumanization of Contemporary Art). Buenos Aires, 1st ed. 2015. ISBN 978-987-33-8245-1. Declared of cultural interest by the Buenos Aires Province Government. Res. 22.
- El Arte Audiovisual: fotografías proyectadas unidas al sonido. Antología de principios estéticos y antecedentes históricos (The Audiovisual Art: Photographs Projected Together with Sound. Anthology of Aesthetic Principles and Historical Background). Buenos Aires, 1st ed. 2015. ISBN 978-987-33-8442-4. Declared of cultural interest by the Buenos Aires Province Government. Res. 22.
- Los Niveles de la Experiencia Estética: sinopsis y antología de los principios de la teoría (The Levels of the Aesthetic Experience: Synopsis and Anthology of the Theory's Principles). Buenos Aires, 1st ed. 2016. ISBN 978-987-33-9786-8
- Obra Audiovisual: Selección Iconográfica. Períodos 2007–2016 (Audiovisual Work: Iconographic Selection, Periods 2007–2016). Buenos Aires, 1st ed. 2016. ISBN 978-987-42-2816-1

=== Other published works ===
- Migraciones: Más de una década de difusión histórico documental. Brochure for the Dirección Nacional de Migraciones [Argentine Immigration Office], Ministry of the Interior. 1987–1999.

== Other activities ==
=== Dirección Nacional de Migraciones ===
Between 1989 and 2001, Farjat developed a program of historical and testimonial dissemination of the migratory experience at the Dirección Nacional de Migraciones (Argentine Immigration Office). Between 1990 and 1992, he organized and directed the institution's museum, serving as coordinator of the commission responsible for collecting related objects and documents (Resolution DNM 3753).

=== Solar de Arte y Memoria Audiovisual ===
The Solar de Arte y Memoria Audiovisual was designed and built by Farjat as a material expression of the philosophical concepts underlying his audiovisual and literary work. Its architecture integrates the built environment with the surrounding natural landscape — both fauna and flora — drawing on elements from several classical architectural traditions to form an eclectic style. The Solar serves as a museum, library, and research center.

=== Asociación Arte y Memoria Audiovisual ===
In 2007, Farjat established the Asociación Arte y Memoria Audiovisual, an organization whose purposes include the promotion of audiovisual art as both an artistic form and a means of communication, its use as a didactic and sociocultural inquiry instrument, theoretical research into the genre, and the preservation of the Solar de Arte y Memoria Audiovisual. These activities were declared of cultural interest by the Government of the Province of Buenos Aires (Resolution No. 177/07).
