= Diorama =

Three-dimensional full-size or miniature model

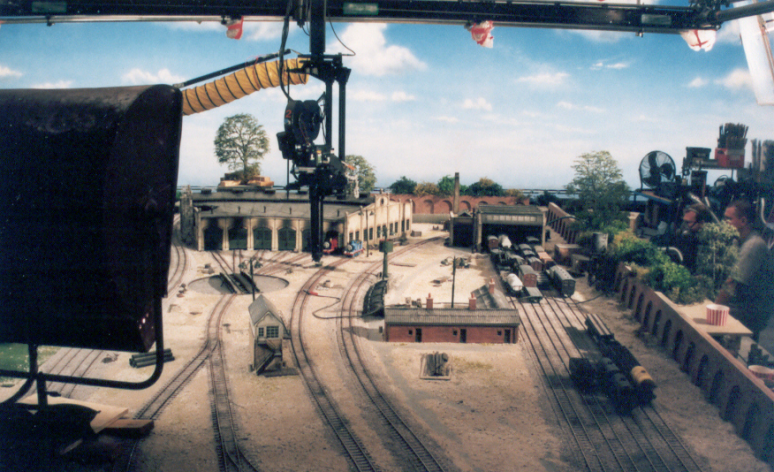
Diorama used for the filming of Thomas & Friends television series

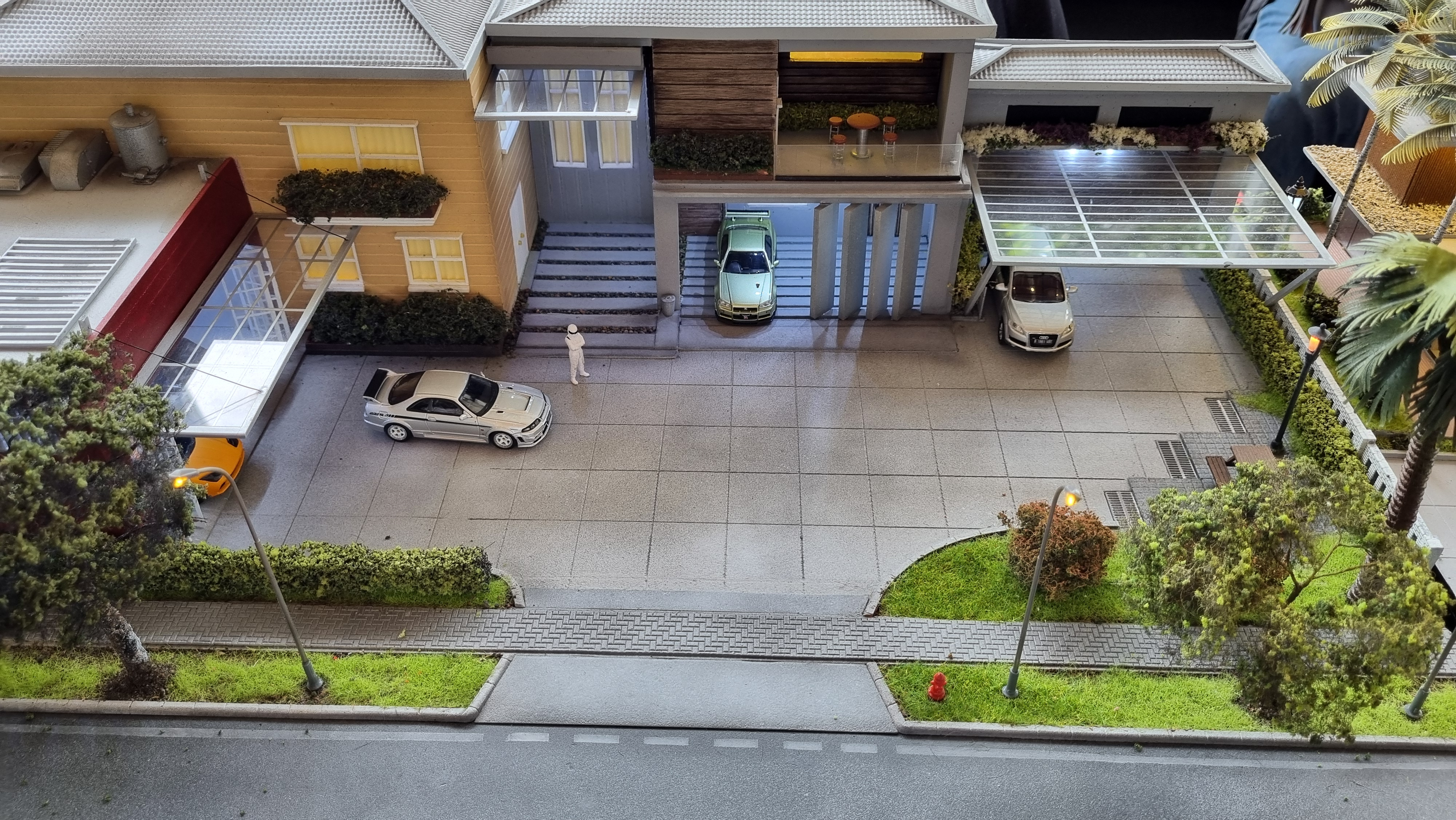
1:64 scale diecast model cars by INNO Models & KYOSHO 64 at a diorama bungalow; in ICE BSD, Indonesia

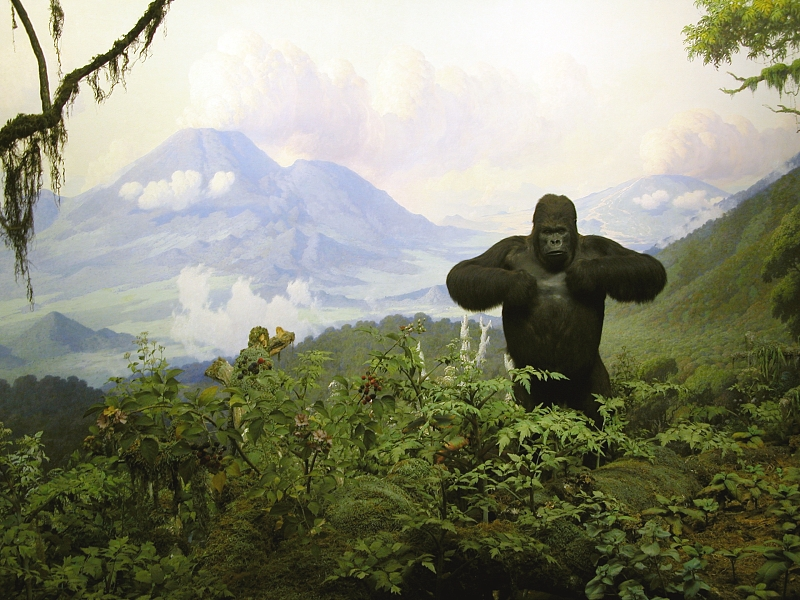
The Exhibition Lab's mountain gorilla diorama at the American Museum of Natural History in Manhattan

A diorama (Note: /ˌdaɪ.əˈrɑːmə/ DY-ə-RAH-mə, US also /-ˈræmə/ -RAM-ə) is a replica of a scene, typically a three-dimensional model either full-sized or miniature. Sometimes dioramas are enclosed in a glass showcase at a museum. Dioramas are often built by hobbyists as part of related hobbies such as military vehicle modeling, miniature figure modeling, or aircraft modeling. Artforms such as taxidermy, wax sculptures, and replicas are commonly linked to dioramas.

In the United States around 1950 and onward, natural history dioramas in museums became less fashionable among academics, leading to many being removed, dismantled, or destroyed; however, research shows they continue to be popular among visitors.

== Etymology ==
Artists Louis Daguerre and Charles Marie Bouton coined the name "diorama" for a theatrical system that used variable lighting to give a translucent painting the illusion of depth and movement. It derives from Greek δια- (through) + ὅραμα (visible image) = "see-through image". The first use in reference to museum displays is recorded in 1902, although such displays existed before.

== Modern ==
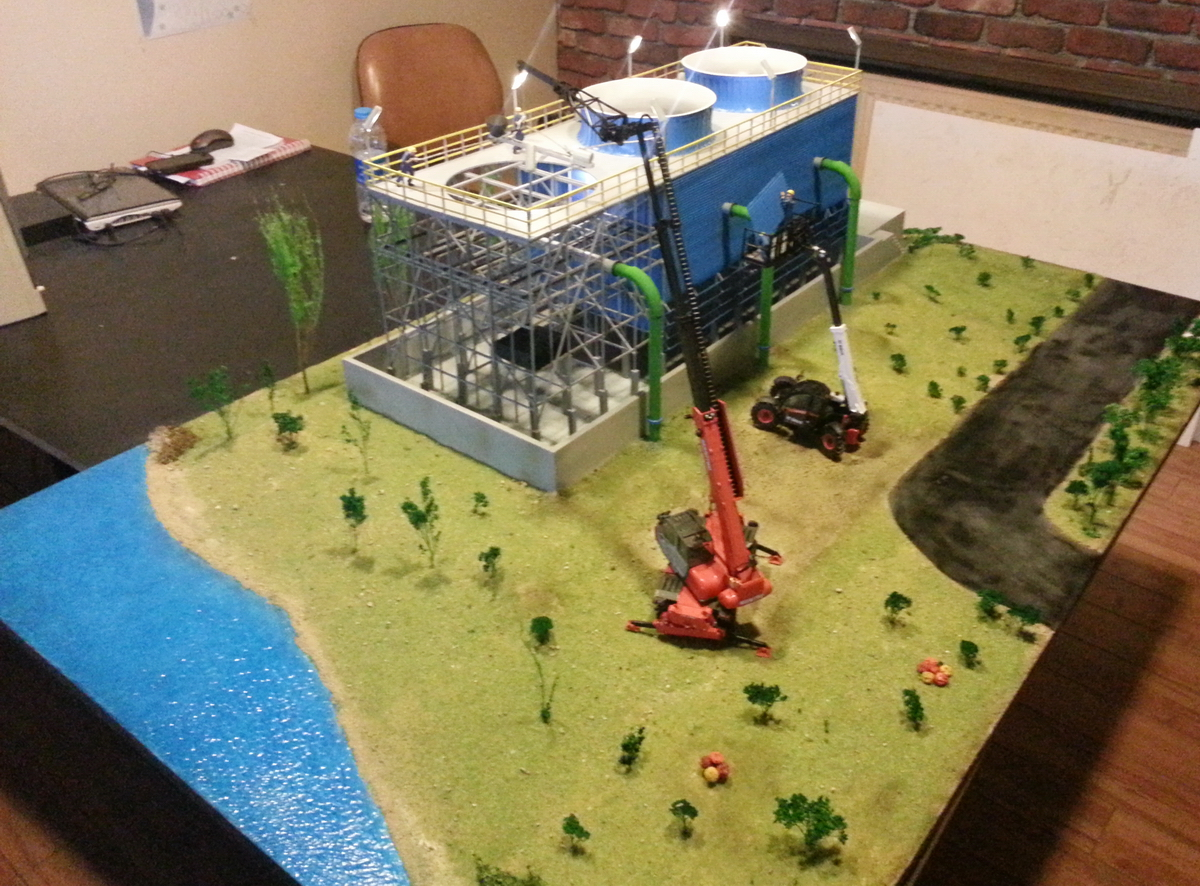
Cooling tower construction diorama

The current, popular understanding of the term "diorama" denotes a partially three-dimensional, full-size replica or scale model of a landscape typically showing historical events, nature scenes, or cityscapes, for purposes of education or entertainment.

One of the first uses of dioramas in a museum was in Stockholm, Sweden where the Biological Museum opened in 1893. It had several dioramas which were on three floors. They were implemented by the Grigore Antipa National Museum of Natural History Bucharest, Romania and constituted a source of inspiration for many important museums in the world (such as the American Museum of Natural History in Manhattan, New York and the Great Oceanographic Museum in Berlin).

=== Miniature ===
Miniature dioramas are typically much smaller, and use scale models and landscaping to create historical or fictional scenes. Such a scale model-based diorama is used, for example, in Chicago's Museum of Science and Industry to display railroading. That diorama employs a common model railroading scale of 1:87 (HO scale). Hobbyist dioramas often use scales including 1:35 or 1:48.

An early, and exceptionally large example was created between 1830 and 1838 by a British Army officer, William Siborne, and represents the Battle of Waterloo at about 7.45 pm, on 18 June 1815. The diorama measures 8.33 by 6 metres (27.3 by 19.7 ft) and used around 70,000 model soldiers in its construction. It is now part of the collection of the National Army Museum in London.

Sheperd Paine, a prominent hobbyist, popularized the modern miniature diorama beginning in the 1970s.

=== Full-size ===
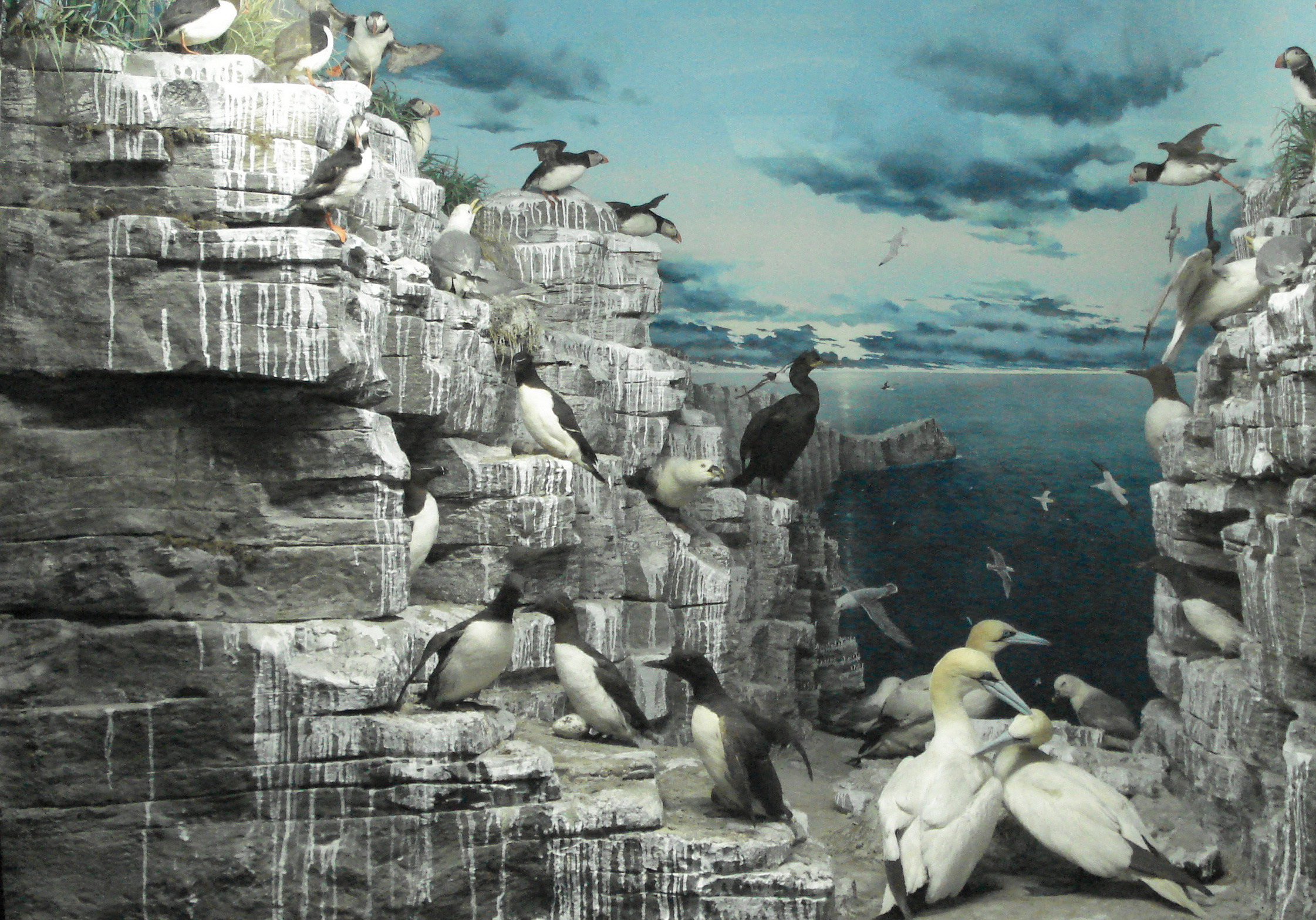
A diorama in the Museum of Natural History in Milan, Italy

Modern museum dioramas may be seen in most major natural-history museums. Typically, these displays simulate a tilted plane effect to represent what would otherwise be a level surface, incorporating a painted background of distant objects. The displays often use false perspective, carefully modifying the scale of objects placed on the plane to reinforce an illusion through depth perception, in which objects of identical real-world size placed farther from the observer appear smaller than those closer. Often the distant painted background or sky will be painted upon a continuous curved surface so that the viewer is not distracted by corners, seams, or edges. All of these techniques are means of presenting a realistic-appearing view of a large scene in a compact space. A photograph or single-eye view of such a diorama can be especially convincing, since in this case there is no distraction by the binocular perception of depth.

=== Uses ===
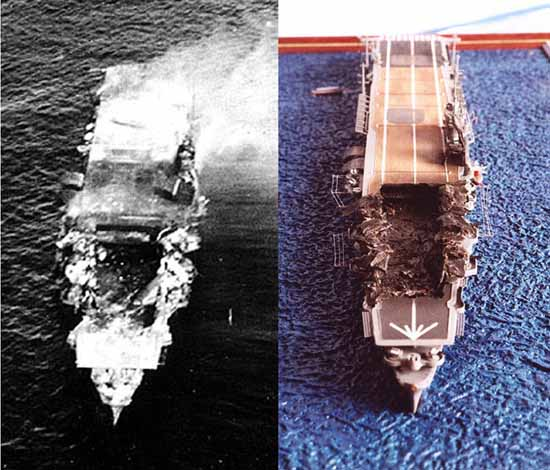
A 1/700 scale diorama of Japanese aircraft carrier Hiryū based on the left photo captured during the Battle of Midway in World War II

Miniature dioramas may be used to represent scenes from historic events. A typical example of this type are dioramas seen at Norway's Resistance Museum in Oslo, Norway.

Landscapes built around model railways can also be considered dioramas, even though they often have to compromise scale accuracy for better operating characteristics. Hobbyists also build dioramas of historical or quasi-historical events using a variety of materials, including plastic models of military vehicles, ships or other equipment, along with scale figures and landscaping.

In the 19th and beginning 20th century, building dioramas of sailing ships had been a popular handcraft of mariners. Building a diorama instead of a normal model had the advantage that in the diorama, the model was protected inside the framework and could easily be stowed below the bunk or behind the sea chest. Nowadays, such antique sailing ship dioramas are valuable collector's items.

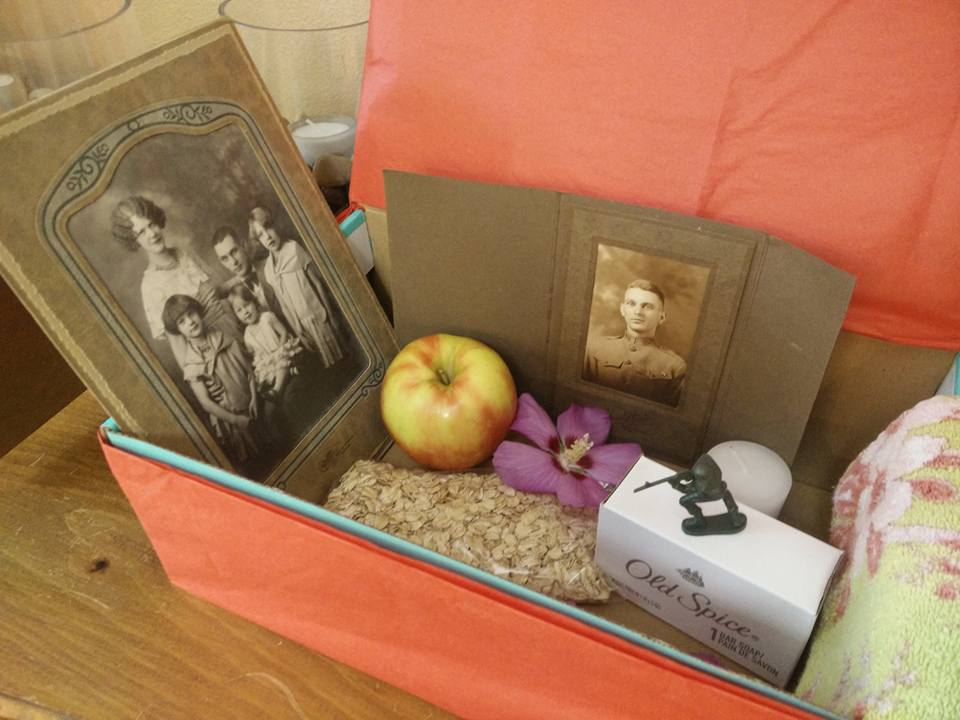
A genealogical diorama for an elementary school class project; the featured subject is a maternal great-grandfather of the student

One of the largest dioramas ever created was a model of the entire state of California built for the Panama–Pacific International Exposition of 1915 and that for a long time was installed in San Francisco's Ferry Building. Dioramas are widely used in the American educational system, mostly in elementary and middle schools. They are often made to represent historical events, ecological biomes, cultural scenes, or to visually depict literature. They are usually made from a shoebox and contain a trompe-l'œil in the background contrasted with two or three-dimensional models in the foreground. In California elementary schools, a popular assignment has fourth graders making a Spanish mission diorama to learn about the California Spanish missions.

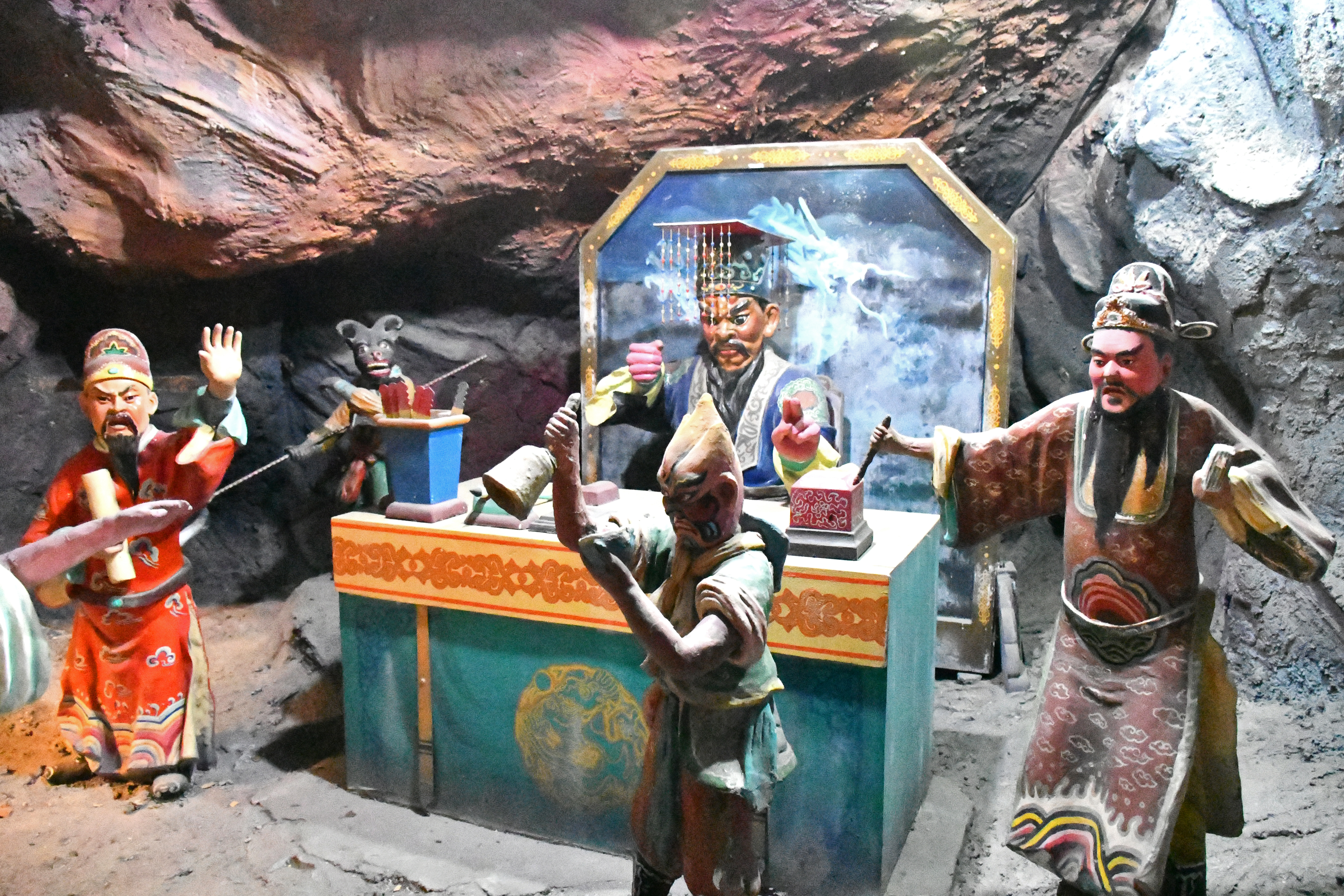
Interior of the Ten Courts of Hell

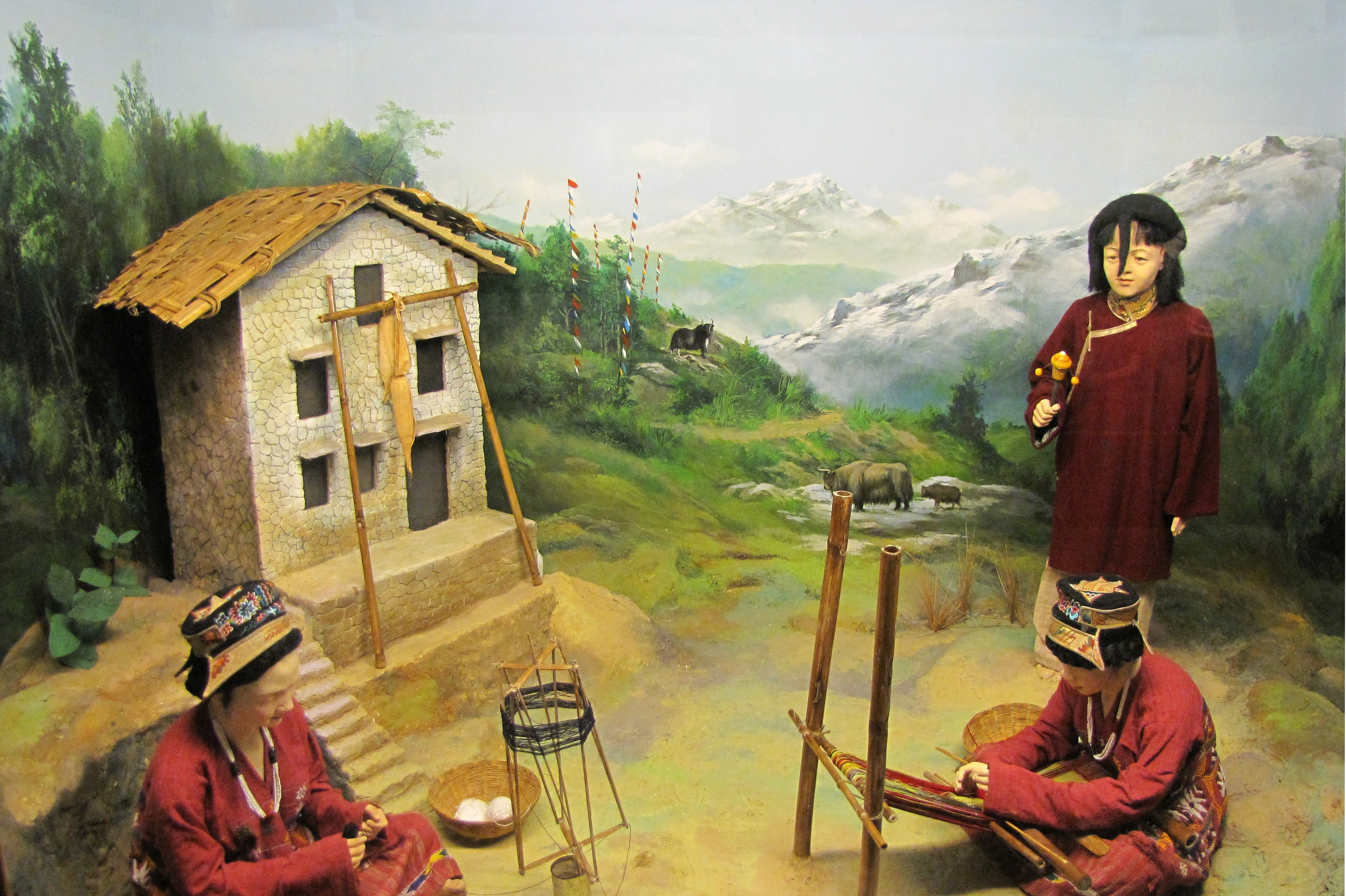
Near life-size diorama of the Monpa people at the Jawaharlal Nehru Museum, Itanagar in Itanagar, India

Burmese-Chinese brothers Aw Boon Haw and Aw Boon Par, the developers of Tiger Balm, opened Haw Par Villa in 1937 in Singapore, where statues and dioramas were commissioned to teach traditional Chinese values. Today, the site contains over 150 giant dioramas depicting scenes from Chinese Literature, folklore, legends, history, philosophy and statuary of key Chinese religions, Taoism, Buddhism, and Confucianism. The best-known attraction in Haw Par Villa is the Ten Courts of Hell, which features gruesome depictions of Hell in Chinese mythology and in Buddhism. Other major attractions include dioramas of scenes from Journey to the West, Fengshen Bang, The Twenty-four Filial Exemplars and the 12 animals in the Chinese zodiac. The park was a major local attraction during the 1970s and 1980s; it is estimated that the park then welcomed at least 1 million annual visitors, and is considered as part of Singapore's cultural heritage.

== Historic ==
=== Daguerre and Bouton ===
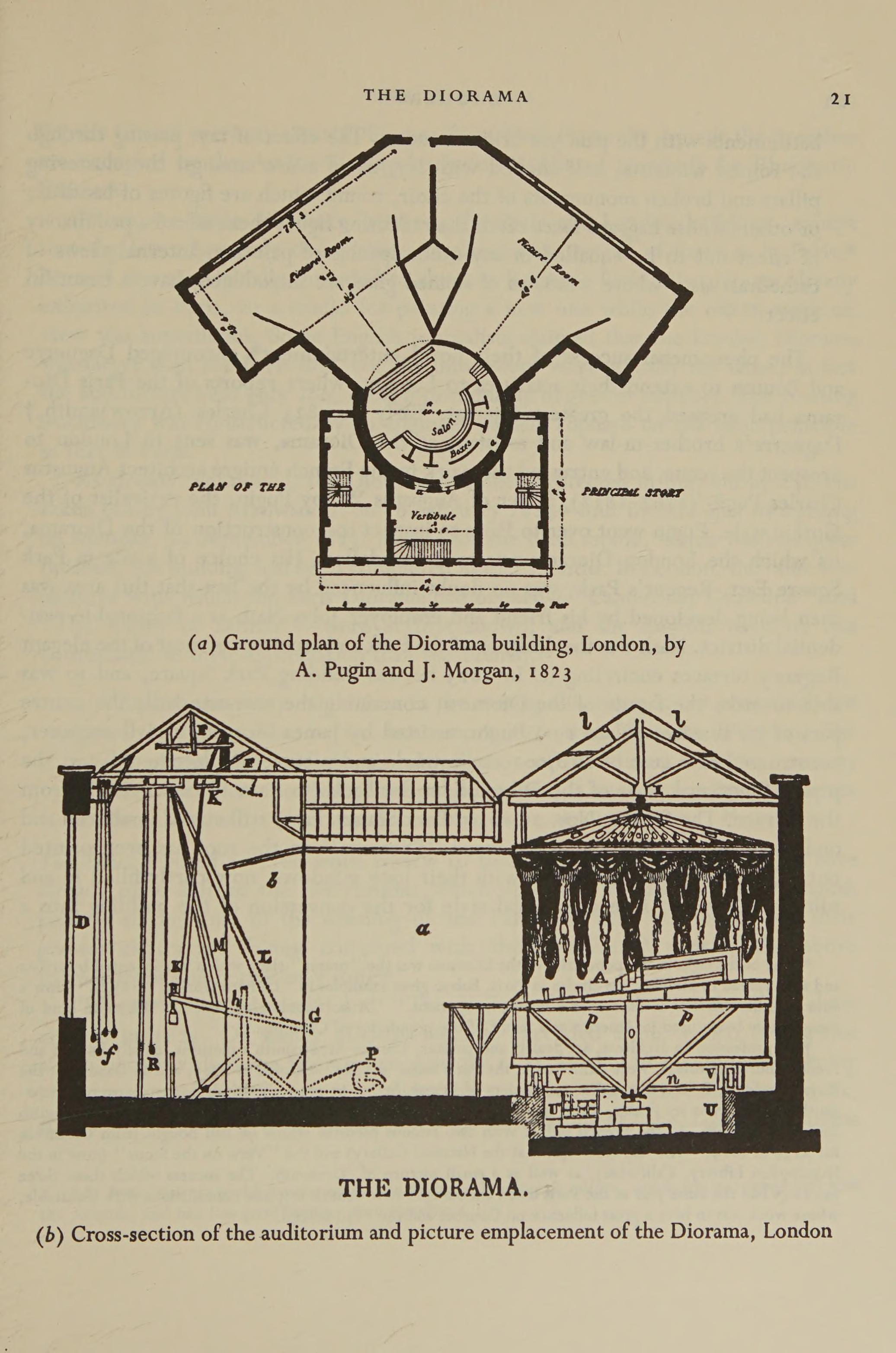
Ground-plan of the Diorama Building, London 1823, by A. Pugin and J. Morgan (illustration reproduced from Gernsheim 1968, p 21)

The Diorama was popular entertainment which originated in Paris in 1822. An alternative to the also popular "Panorama" (panoramic painting), the Diorama was a theatrical experience viewed by an audience in a highly specialized theatre. As many as 350 patrons would file in to view a landscape painting that would change its appearance both subtly and dramatically. Most would stand, though limited seating was provided. The show lasted 10 to 15 minutes, after which time the entire audience (on a massive turntable) would rotate to view a second painting. Later models of the Diorama theater even held a third painting.

The size of the proscenium was 24 feet (7.3 m) wide by 21 feet (6.4 m) high (7.3 meters x 6.4 meters). Each scene was hand-painted on linen, which was made transparent in selected areas. A series of these multi-layered, linen panels were arranged in a deep, truncated tunnel, then illuminated by sunlight re-directed via skylights, screens, shutters, and colored blinds. Depending on the direction and intensity of the skillfully manipulated light, the scene would appear to change. The effect was so subtle and finely rendered that both critics and the public were astounded, believing they were looking at a natural scene.

The inventors and proprietors of the Diorama were Charles-Marie Bouton (1781– 1853), a Troubador painter who also worked at the Panorama under Pierre Prévost, and Louis Jacques Mandé Daguerre (1787–1851), formerly a decorator, manufacturer of mirrors, painter of Panoramas, and designer and painter of theatrical stage illusions. Daguerre would later co-invent the daguerreotype, the first widely used method of photography. A second diorama in Regent's Park in London was opened by an association of British men (having bought Daguerre's tableaux) in 1823, a year after the debut of Daguerre's Paris original. The building was designed by Augustus Charles Pugin. Bouton operated the Regent's Park diorama from 1830 to 1840, when it was taken over by his protégé, the painter Charles-Caïus Renoux.

The Regent's Park diorama was a popular sensation, and spawned immediate imitations. British artists including Clarkson Stanfield and David Roberts produced ever-more elaborate (moving) dioramas through the 1830s; sound effects and even living performers were added. Some "typical diorama effects included moonlit nights, winter snow turning into a summer meadow, rainbows after a storm, illuminated fountains", waterfalls, thunder and lightning, and ringing bells. A diorama painted by Daguerre is currently housed in the church of the French town Bry-sur-Marne, where he lived and died.

Daguerre diorama exhibitions (R.D. Wood, 1993)

Exhibition venues : Paris (Pa.1822-28) : London (Lo.1823-32) : Liverpool (Li.1827-32) : Manchester (Ma.1825-27) : Dublin (Du.1826-28) : Edinburgh (Ed.1828-36)

- The Valley of Sarnen :: (Pa.1822-23) : (Lo.1823-24) : (Li.1827-28) : (Ma.1825) : (Du.1826-27) : (Ed. 1828-29 & 1831)
- The Harbour of Brest :: (Pa.1823) : (Lo.1824-25 & 1837) : (Li.1825-26) : (Ma.1826-27) : (Ed. 1834–35)
- The Holyrood Chapel :: (Pa.1823-24) : (Lo.1825) : (Li.1827-28) : (Ma.1827) : (Du.1828) : (Ed.1829-30)
- The Roslin Chapel :: (Pa.1824-25) : (Lo.1826-27) : (Li.1828-29) : (Du.1827-28) : (Ed.1835)
- The Ruins in a Fog :: (Pa.1825-26) : (Lo.1827-28) : (Ed.1832-33)
- The Village of Unterseen :: (Pa.1826-27) : (Lo.1828-29) : (Li.1832) : (Ed.1833-34 & 1838)
- The Village of Thiers :: (Pa.1827-28) : (Lo.1829-30) : (Ed. 1838–39)
- The Mont St. Godard :: (Pa.1828-29) : (Lo.1830-32) : (Ed.1835-36)

=== Gottstein ===
Until 1968, Britain boasted a large number of dioramas. The collections were originally housed in the Royal United Services Institute Museum, (formerly the Banqueting House), in Whitehall. When the museum closed, the various exhibits and their 15 known dioramas were distributed to smaller museums throughout England and elsewhere, some ending up in Canada. These dioramas were the brainchild of the wealthy furrier Otto Gottstein (1892–1951) of Leipzig, a Jewish immigrant from Hitler's Germany, who was an avid collector and designer of flat model figures called flats. In 1930, Gottstein's influence is first seen at the Leipzig International Exhibition, along with the dioramas of Hahnemann of Kiel, Biebel of Berlin and Muller of Erfurt, all displaying their own figures, and those commissioned from such as Ludwig Frank in large diorama form.

In 1933, Gottstein left Germany and in 1935 founded the British Model Soldier Society. He persuaded designer and painter friends in both Germany and France to help in the construction of dioramas depicting notable events in English history. But due to the war, many of the figures arrived in England incomplete. The task of turning Gottstein's ideas into reality fell to his English friends and those friends who had managed to escape from the Continent. Dennis (Denny) C. Stokes, a talented painter and diorama maker in his own right, was responsible for the painting of the backgrounds of all the dioramas, creating a unity seen throughout the whole series. Denny Stokes was given the overall supervision of the fifteen dioramas.

1. The Landing of the Romans under Julius Caesar in 55 B.C.
2. The Battle of Hastings
3. The Storming of Acre (figures by Muller)
4. The Battle of Crecy (figures by Muller)
5. The Field of the Cloth of Gold
6. Queen Elizabeth reviewing her troops at Tilbury in Essex
7. The Battle of Marston Moor
8. The Battle of Blenheim (painted by Douchkine)
9. The Battle of Plessey
10. The Battle of Quebec (engraved by Krunert of Vienna)
11. The Old Guard at Waterloo
12. The Charge of the Light Brigade
13. The Battle of Ulundi (figures by Ochel and Petrocochino/Paul Armont)
14. The Battle of Fleurs
15. The D-Day landings

Krunert, Schirmer, Frank, Frauendorf, Maier, Franz Rieche, and Oesterrich were also involved in the manufacture and design of figures for the various dioramas. Krunert (a Viennese), like Gottstein an exile in London, was given the job of engraving for The Battle of Quebec. The Death of Wolfe was found to be inaccurate and had to be redesigned. The names of the vast majority of painters employed by Gottstein are mostly unknown, most lived and worked on the continent, among them Gustave Kenmow, Leopold Rieche, L. Dunekate, M. Alexandre, A. Ochel, Honey Ray, and, perhaps Gottstein's top painter, Vladimir Douchkine (a Russian émigré who lived in Paris). Douchkine was responsible for painting two figures of the Duke of Marlborough on horseback for 'The Blenheim Diorama', one of which was used, the other, Gottstein being the true collector, was never released.

Denny Stokes painted all the backgrounds of all the dioramas, Herbert Norris, the Historical Costume Designer, whom J. F. Lovel-Barnes introduced to Gottstein, was responsible for the costume design of the Ancient Britons, the Normans and Saxons, some of the figures of The Field of the Cloth of Gold and the Elizabethan figures for Queen Elizabeth at Tilbury. J.F. Lovel-Barnes was responsible for The Battle of Blenheim, selecting the figures, and arrangement of the scene. Due to World War II, when flat figures became unavailable, Gottstein completed his ideas by using Greenwood and Ball's 20 mm figures. In time, a fifteenth diorama was added, using these 20 mm figures, this diorama representing the D-Day landings. When all the dioramas were completed, they were displayed along one wall in the Royal United Services Institute Museum. When the museum was closed the fifteen dioramas were distributed to various museums and institutions. The greatest number are at the Glenbow Museum, (130-9th Avenue, S. E. Calgary, Alberta, Canada): RE: The Landing of the Romans under Julius Caesar in 55 BC, Battle Of Crecy, The Battle of Blenheim, The Old Guard at Waterloo and The Charge of the Light Brigade at Balaclava.

The state of these dioramas is one of debate; John Garratt (The World of Model Soldiers) claimed in 1968, that the dioramas "appear to have been partially broken up and individual figures have been sold to collectors". According to the Glenbow Institute (Barry Agnew, curator) "the figures are still in reasonable condition, but the plaster groundwork has suffered considerable deterioration". There are no photographs available of the dioramas. The Battle of Hastings diorama was to be found in the Old Town Museum, Hastings, and is still in reasonable condition. It shows the Norman cavalry charging up Senlac Hill toward the Saxon lines. The Storming of Acre is in the Museum of Artillery at the Rotunda, Woolwich. John Garratt, in Encyclopedia of Model Soldiers, states that The Field of the Cloth of Gold was in the possession of the Royal Military School of Music, Kneller Hall; according to the curator, the diorama had not been in his possession since 1980, nor is it listed in their Accession Book, so the whereabouts of this diorama is unknown.

The Battle of Ulundi is housed in the Staffordshire Regiment Museum at Whittington near Lichfield in Staffordshire, UK

=== Wong ===
Frank Wong, an artist from San Francisco (born 22 September 1932), created dioramas which depict the San Francisco Chinatown of his youth during the 1930s and 1940s. In 2004, Wong donated seven miniatures of scenes of Chinatown, titled "The Chinatown Miniatures Collection", to the Chinese Historical Society of America (CHSA). The dioramas are on permanent display in CHSA's Main Gallery:

1. "The Moon Festival"
2. "Shoeshine Stand"
3. "Chinese New Year"
4. "Chinese Laundry"
5. "Christmas Scene"
6. "Single Room"
7. "Herb Store"

==== Documentary ====
San Francisco filmmaker James Chan is producing and directing a documentary about Wong and the "changing landscape of Chinatown" in San Francisco. The documentary is tentatively titled, "Frank Wong's Chinatown".

=== Other ===
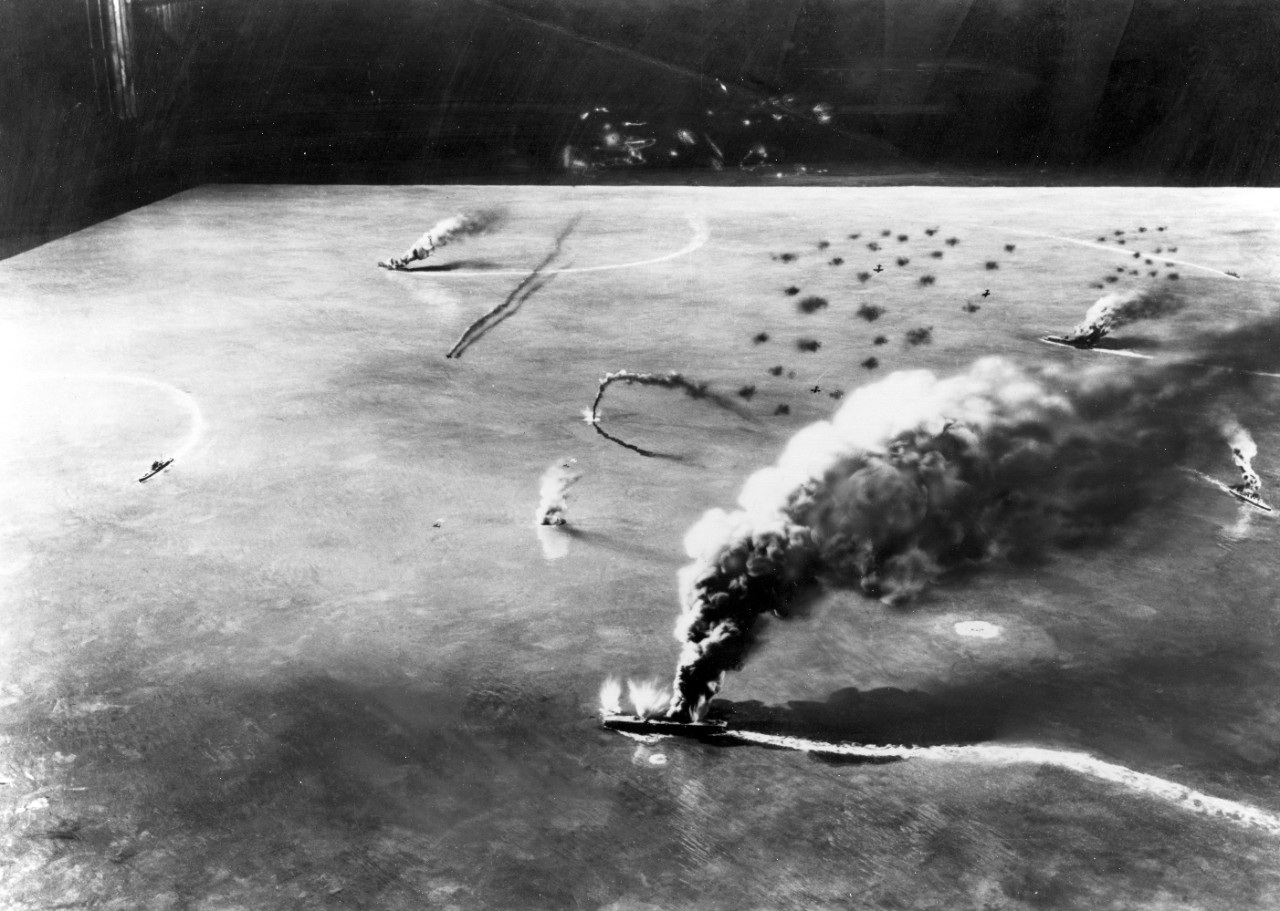
This photorealistic diorama of the Battle of Midway was created during World War II on the basis of information then available.

Painters of the Romantic era including John Martin and Francis Danby were influenced to create large and highly dramatic pictures by the sensational dioramas and panoramas of their day. In one case, the connection between life and diorama art became intensely circular. On 1 February 1829, John Martin's brother Jonathan, known as "Mad Martin", set fire to the roof of York Minster. Clarkson Stanfield created a diorama re-enactment of the event, which premiered on 20 April of the same year; it employed a "safe fire" via chemical reaction as a special effect. On 27 May, the "safe" fire proved to be less safe than planned: it set a real fire in the painted cloths of the imitation fire, which burned down the theater and all of its dioramas.

Nonetheless, dioramas remained popular in England, Scotland, and Ireland through most of the 19th century, lasting until 1880. A small scale version of the diorama called the Polyrama Panoptique could display images in the home and was marketed from the 1820s.

== In films ==
=== Thomas & Friends ===
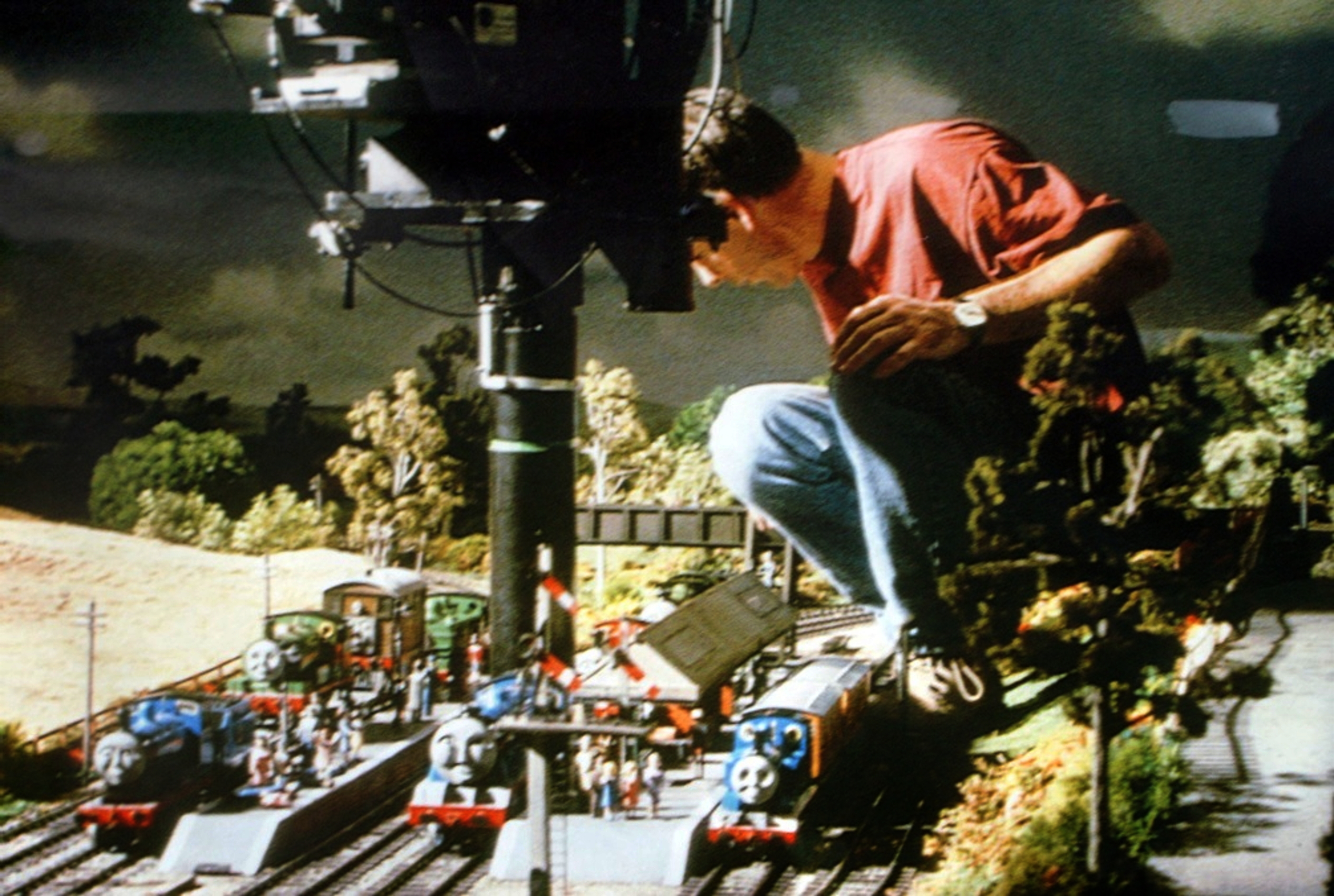
Setting up the diorama for the live-action film of Thomas & Friends

The television series for Thomas & Friends started production in 1984, produced by Clearwater Features Ltd and ITV's Central Independent Television region. The series was originally shot and produced with live action models and dioramas at the Clearwater in-house studio in Battersea, a suburb of London, for Series 1. Production was later relocated to Shepperton Studios, Surrey, southwest of London, for subsequent series. The use of moving models was seen at the time of the series' conception as an effective method of animating the stories. Locomotives and other vehicles were operated by radio controls, while humans and animals were static figures. Stop motion was occasionally employed for instances in which a human or animal character would move. Hand-drawn animation was used in Series 3 to create bees. (Note: As seen in the episode "Buzz Buzz")

The show would go on using miniature scale models and dioramas until Series 12 (2008); which saw the introduction of CGI effects (provided by HiT Entertainment's subsidiary Hot Animation), with the intent of producing the show entirely in CGI the following year. The traditional models and sets were still used, but with computer-animated faces superimposed on the models to allow for changing facial expressions. Humans and animals were fully computer-animated to allow for walking movement.

=== Tora! Tora! Tora! ===
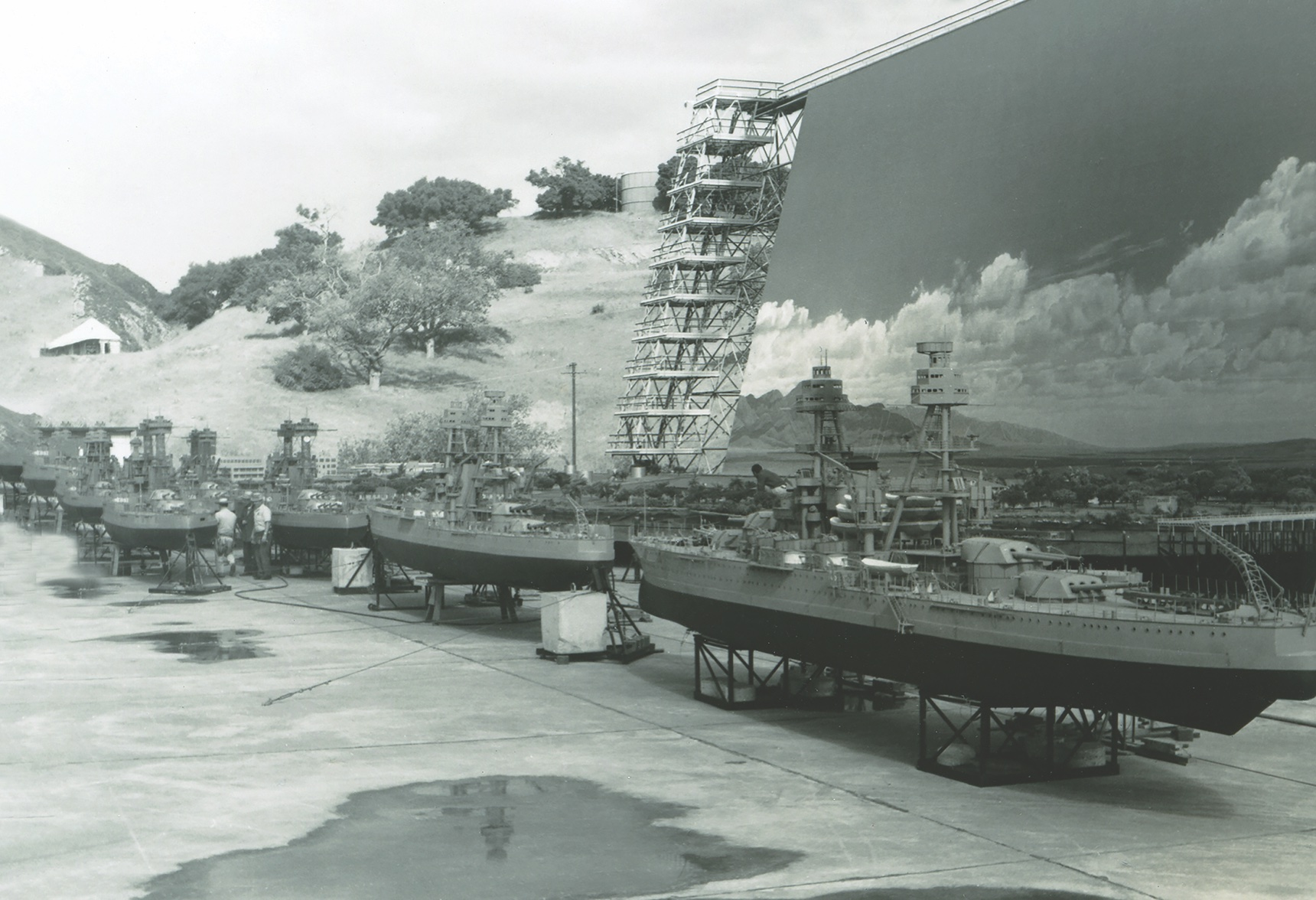
Behind the scenes of the filming of Tora! Tora! Tora! A diorama of Battleship models to a 1/15 scale was made to stimulate Pearl Harbor.

For the filming of the Battleship Row overhead shots in the film Tora! Tora! Tora!, the special effects crew built diorama battleship models built to a 1/15 scale, with some reaching up to 40ft long. The model of one of them, the USS Nevada still survives today in Los Angeles and often appears at local parades.

== Natural history ==
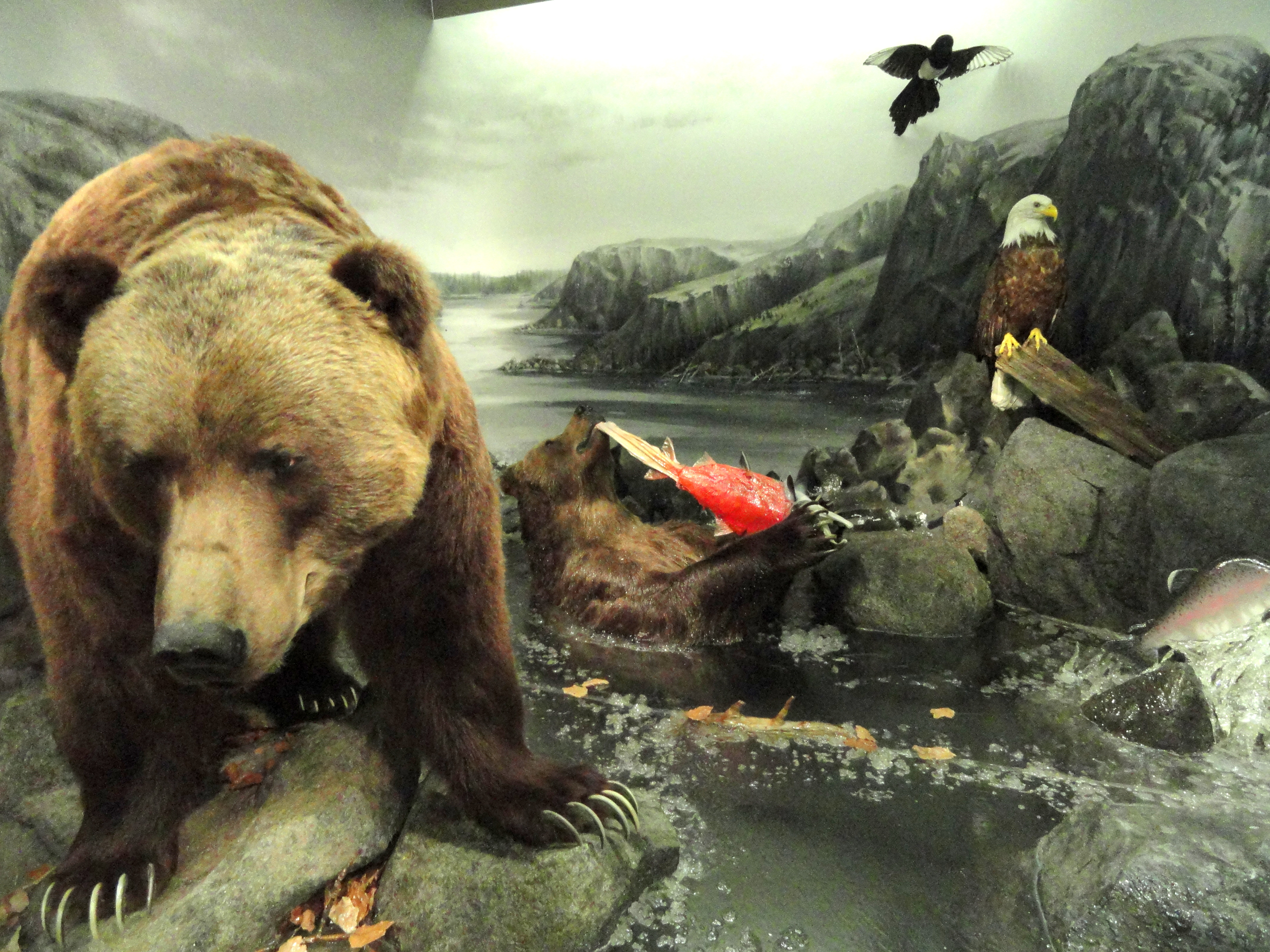
The bear diorama at the Finnish Museum of Natural History in Helsinki, Finland

Natural history dioramas seek to imitate nature and, since their conception in the late 19th century, aim to "nurture a reverence for nature [with its] beauty and grandeur". They have also been described as a means to visually preserve nature as different environments change due to human involvement. They were extremely popular during the first half of the 20th century, both in the US and UK, later on giving way to television, film, and new perspectives on science.

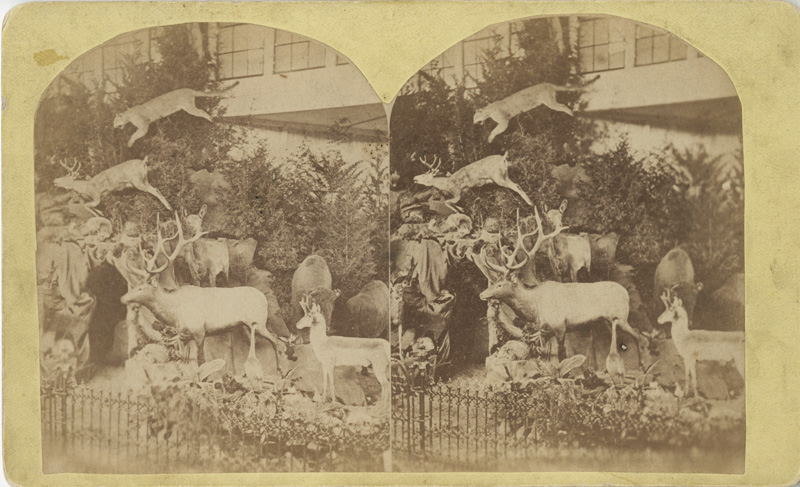
An early natural history diorama at the 1876 Philadelphia Centennial Exhibition created by Martha Maxwell is shown. Stereograph image produced by Centennial Photographic Company

Like historical dioramas, natural history dioramas are a mix of two- and three-dimensional elements. What sets natural history dioramas apart from other categories is the use of taxidermy in addition to the foreground replicas and painted background. The use of taxidermy means that natural history dioramas derive not only from Daguerre's work, but also from that of taxidermists, who were used to preparing specimens for either science or spectacle. It was only with the dioramas' precursors (and, later on, dioramas) that both these objectives merged. Popular diorama precursors were produced by Charles Willson Peale, an artist with an interest in taxidermy, during the early 19th century. To present his specimens, Peale "painted skies and landscapes on the back of cases displaying his taxidermy specimens". By the late 19th century, the British Museum held an exhibition featuring taxidermy birds set on models of plants.

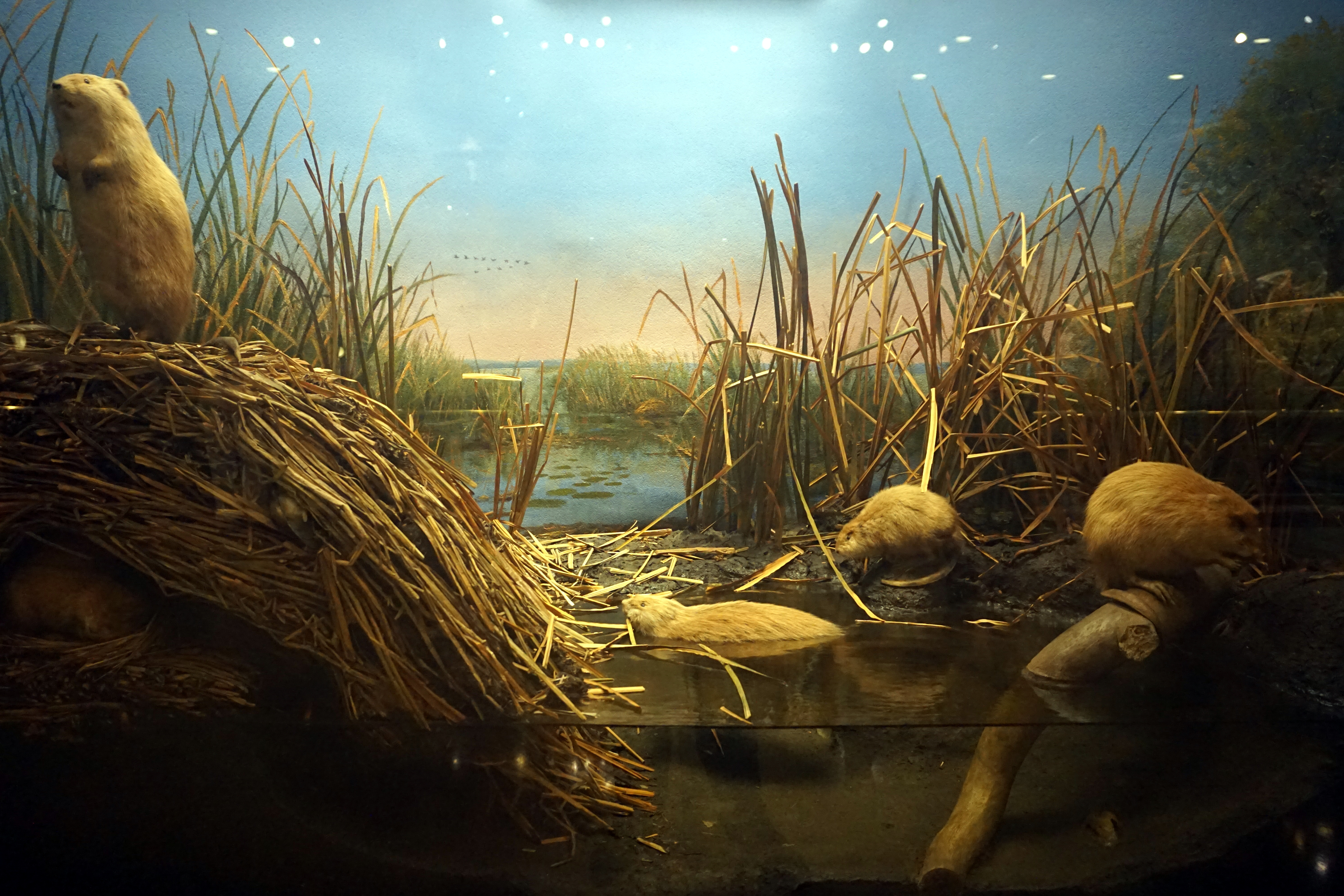
Carl Akeley's The Muskrat Habitat Group diorama at the Milwaukee Public Museum in Milwaukee, Wisconsin

The first habitat diorama created for a museum was constructed by taxidermist Carl Akeley for the Milwaukee Public Museum in Milwaukee, Wisconsin in 1889, where it is still held. Akeley set taxidermy muskrats in a three-dimensional re-creation of their wetland habitat with a realistic painted background. With the support of curator Frank M. Chapman, Akeley designed the popular habitat dioramas featured at the American Museum of Natural History in Manhattan, New York. Combining art with science, these exhibitions were intended to educate the public about the growing need for habitat conservation. The modern AMNH Exhibitions Lab is charged with the creation of all dioramas and otherwise immersive environments in the museum.

A predecessor of Akeley, naturalist and taxidermist Martha Maxwell created a famous habitat diorama for the first World's Fair which was held in Philadelphia in 1876. The complex diorama featured taxidermied animals in realistic action poses, running water, and live prairie dogs. It is speculated that this display was the first of its kind [outside of a museum]. Maxwell's pioneering diorama work is said to have influenced major figures in taxidermy history who entered the field later, such as Akeley and William Temple Hornaday.

Soon, the concern for accuracy came. Groups of scientists, taxidermists, and artists would go on expeditions to ensure accurate backgrounds and collect specimens, though some would be donated by game hunters. Natural history dioramas reached the peak of their grandeur with the opening of the Akeley Hall of African Mammals in 1936, which featured large animals, such as elephants, surrounded by even larger scenery. Nowadays, various institutions lay different claims to notable dioramas. The Milwaukee Public Museum still displays the world's first diorama, created by Akeley; the American Museum of Natural History has what might be the world's largest diorama: a life-size replica of a blue whale; the Biological Museum in Stockholm, Sweden is known for its three dioramas, all created in 1893, and all in original condition; the Powell-Cotton Museum, in Birchington, UK, is known for having the world's oldest, unchanged, room-sized diorama, built in 1896.

=== Construction ===
Natural history dioramas typically consist of 3 parts:

1. The painted background
2. The foreground
3. Taxidermy specimens

Preparations for the background begin in the field, where an artist takes photographs and sketches references pieces. Once back at the museum, the artist has to depict the scenery with as much realism as possible. The challenge lies in the fact that the wall used is curved: this allows the background to surround the display without seams joining different panels. At times the wall also curves upward to meet the light above and form a sky. By having a curved wall, whatever the artist paints will be distorted by perspective; it is the artist's job to paint in such a way that minimises this distortion.

The foreground is created to mimic the ground, plants and other accessories to scenery. The ground, hills, rocks, and large trees are created with wood, wire mesh, and plaster. Smaller trees are either used in their entirety or replicated using casts. Grasses and shrubs can be preserved in solution or dried to then be added to the diorama. Ground debris, such as leaf litter, is collected on site and soaked in wallpaper paste for preservation and presentation in the diorama. Water is simulated using glass or plexiglass with ripples carved on the surface. For a diorama to be successful, the foreground and background must merge, so both artists have to work together.

Taxidermy specimens are usually the centrepiece of dioramas. Since they must entertain, as well as educate, specimens are set in lifelike poses, so as to convey a narrative of an animal's life. Smaller animals are usually made with rubber moulds and painted. Larger animals are prepared by first making a clay sculpture of the animal. This sculpture is made over the actual, posed skeleton of the animal, with reference to moulds and measurements taken on the field. A papier-mâché mannequin is prepared from the clay sculpture, and the animal's tanned skin is sewn onto the mannequin. Glass eyes substitute the real ones.

If an animal is large enough, the scaffolding that holds the specimen needs to be incorporated into the foreground design and construction.

=== Decline ===
Since the 1950's natural history dioramas have declined in reputation for a variety of reasons. The rise of colored photography and television allowed the public to easily view wildlife in regions they otherwise wouldn't visit in detail. Zoos around this time also started opting to recreate natural habitats in animal enclosures and sought to preserve animal's wild instincts instead of training them. Many museums reacted to these changes by instead emphasizing how close visitors could get to specimens, displaying taxidermy mounts in glass cases and walk through exhibits.

In addition to technological changes, many academics would argue that dioramas were problematic and tied to colonialism, sexism, and poaching. Many specimens in dioramas were acquired in the late 19th and early 20th centuries when modern hunting guidelines and species protection did not exist, mainly by wealthy white men visiting regions besides Europe, leading to some describing dioramas as relics of colonialism and a period of poor conservation of nature. In 1989 feminist scholar Donna Haraway decried how many dioramas prominently depict male specimens of animals instead of female ones, with female specimens often depicted in lesser positions then males.

For these reasons the 21st century has seen the destruction and replacement of many natural history dioramas. In 2003 the Smithsonian’s National Museum of Natural History opted to replace it's dioramas with minimalist displays. Later museum renovations would often replace dioramas with interactive displays. Despite a desire to replace dioramas, research from the Oakland Museum of California found that they were the second most viewed type of display in the museum.

== Toy examples ==
=== Lego ===
Lego dioramas are dioramas which are built from Lego pieces. The dioramas range from small vignettes to large, table-sized displays, and are sometimes constructed in a collaboration with two or more people. Some AFOL(adult fans of Lego) engage in the building of Lego dioramas.

== See also ==
- Armor Modeling and Preservation Society
- Cosmorama
- Cyclorama
- Model airport
- Model figure
- Moving panorama
- Myriorama
- Nativity scene
- Tableau vivant
- Toy
- Toy soldier
