= California mission project =

Class project done in California

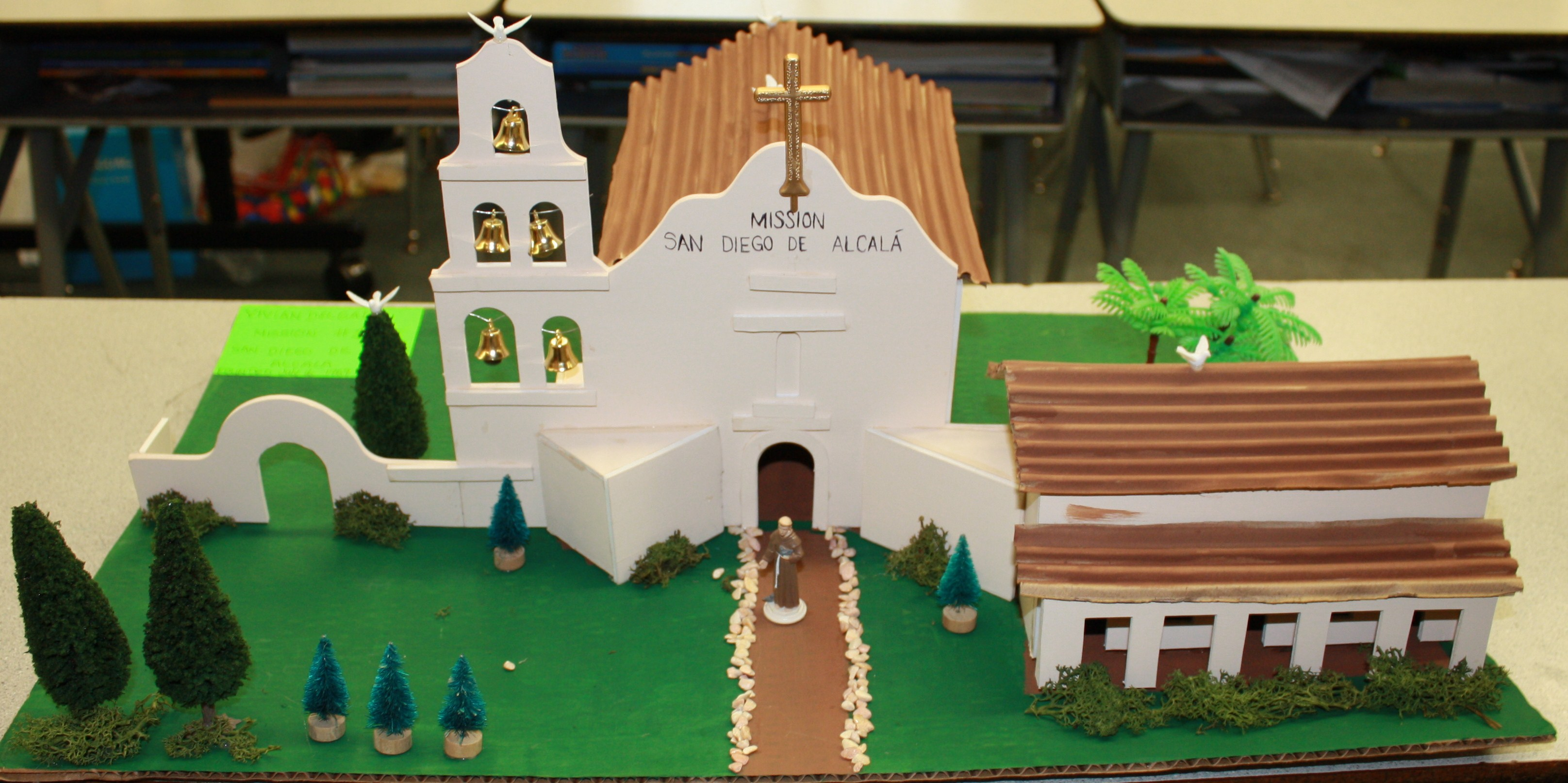
Diorama of Mission San Diego de Alcalá made by a California elementary school student

The California mission project is an assignment done in California elementary schools, most often in the fourth grade, where students build dioramas of one of the 21 Spanish missions in California. While not being included in the California Common Core educational standards, the project was vastly popular and done throughout the state to explore the "strong Spanish influence in California. However, in recent decades the popularity of the project has declined due to scrutiny on what the assignment teaches students about the treatment of indigenous Californians in the California Spanish missions. In specific school districts, such as Los Angeles Unified School District, current curriculum stresses the importance of incorporating Indigenous and abstaining from mission projects. According to Cindy Mata, associate director of the UCLA History-Geography Project, this is in part effort to acknowledge the history of Indigenous lives affected.

== Description ==
The mission project is commonly assigned to California elementary school students in the fourth grade when they are first learning about their state's Spanish missions. Students are assigned one of the 21 Spanish missions in California and have to build a diorama out of common household objects such as popsicle sticks, sugar cubes, papier-mâché, and cardboard. The project is so commonly done that premade kits of specific missions can be found in craft stores and giftshops at the missions themselves.

Alongside the mission project, some schools send their classes to local Missions to learn about its history and participate in child-friendly Mission-era activities such as leather tooling, churning butter, and making tortillas by hand.

During the pandemic, students explored their respective missions through a research presentation via google slides, or through virtual models and crafts.

== History ==
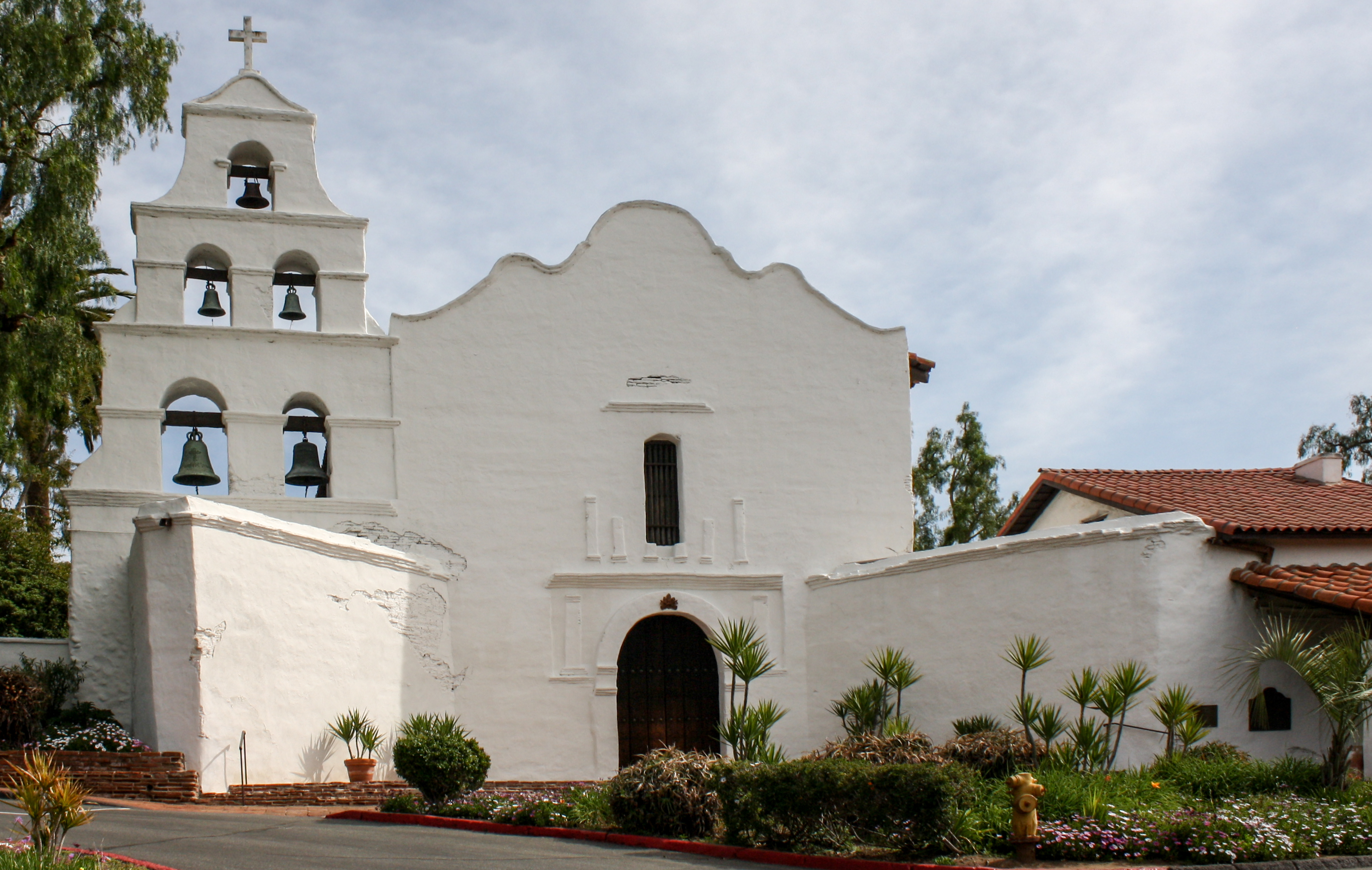
Mission San Diego de Alcalá in San Diego, California

=== Background ===
The 21 Spanish missions in present-day California were built between 1769 and 1833 largely by indigenous Californian slaves at the behest of Spanish Franciscan priests who sought to evangelize them. The natives were forced to stay in the missions and were kept in squalid conditions, forced to work, and were severely malnourished. The mission Indians also experienced beatings, torture, and brandings at the hands of the friars. Indigenous people often suffered sexual abuse from soldiers from the nearby presidios, and priests often prohibited them from practicing their traditional customs and norms from priests. Sexual abuse was rampant, and strict regulations enforced occasionally led to Indians fleeing from the mission. Oftentimes, the Fathers could not comprehend or accept Native American's way of life or identity - such as the discovery of berdache, male homosexual transverstism.. Approximately 62,000 indigenous Californians died from a combination of disease and severe mistreatment by the time the missions ceased operation in 1833.

=== Missions in education ===
"At the missions, the priests worked to create loyal Spanish subjects. . . . They would move the California Indians into the missions, teach them to be Christians, and show them European ways."

— Excerpt from Lesson 3, "The Mission System" in the 2007 textbook California: A Changing State, Emphasis added by Deborah A. Miranda.

The fourth grade is the first, and potentially only, time that California students learn about the California missions. Many textbooks and educational resources throughout history glossed over the mistreatment of Indigenous Californians in the missions and glorified the actions of the Spanish due to being aimed towards children. According to a history journal, the Spanish colonists were depicted as heroic pioneers in the first lessons about California history in 1925. In the 1960s and 70s, certain Californian educators actively worked to promote the image of the Spanish priests who worked in missions.

Models of California missions have been built in California schools since the 1960s. While never being included in California's educational curriculum, the assignment spread across the state.

=== Reforming mission education ===
"Building missions from sugar cubes or popsicle sticks does not help students understand the period and is offensive to many. Instead, students should have access to multiple sources to help them understand the lives of different groups of people who lived in and around missions, so that students can place them in a comparative context."

— Excerpt from Chapter 7, "California: A Changing State" in the 2017 History/Social Science Framework for California public schools.

The prevalence of the project has dropped substantially as of the mid-2010s. While indigenous and Chicano educational activists have protested the disingenuous portrayal of the California missions since the 1960s. Consequently, in 2015, the Acjachemen Nation adopted a resolution opposing Father Junípero Serra's canonization. This was due to his association with Church and state policies that targeted Indigenous cultural and linguistic practices. However, it was not until 2016 that the state of California took a stance against the project. The historical curriculum framework adopted by the California Department of Education in 2016 and revealed to the public in 2017 specifically recommends against the mission project as a form of teaching students about the missions. In 2022, California passed the Indian Education Act (AB 1703), which encouraged school districts, administrations, and staff to develop educational materials intertwining Indigenous tribes perspectives and experience. Authored by Assembly member James C. Ramos, this act aims to evaluate appropriate and unsuitable depictions of Native Americans, and ensure that pupils cover the depth of the history of Indians. Moreover, the Bill established the California Indian Education Task Forces to submit a yearly report of the extent of their success. Subsequent educational resources have included the California Missions Through Native American Perspectives unit and the California Indian Education for All that is directly for fourth-graders.

Chapter 7, from History Social Science Framework for California Public High School, revolves around fourth grade education and instead recommends teachers to ask their students to consider what life was like for the several groups who were involved with the missions, such as "the native population, the Spanish military, the Spanish–Mexican settler population, and the missionaries". Outlined in the book, this framework also recommends that students explore the mission period through carefully selected primary and secondary sources. These may include historical journals, letters written by Indigenous people, and literature - examining the experiences of different groups. Instead of wholly focusing on the structure of the mission and the project itself, the curriculum stresses the daily importance to understanding the daily lives of Indigenous Californians, Spanish missionaries, soldiers, and Mexican settlers. It also encourages teachers to address Indigenous agency within the mission system, highlighting cases of resistance and revolt. Moreover, students are invited to investigate the environmental consequences of Spanish colonization, especially the introduction of European plants and livestock and its lasting consequence to California's agriculture and ecosystem practices. This is one of the many changes made by the California History-Social Science Project (CHSSP), the creators of the framework, advocates to teach the history of Indigenous Californians in a more historic and comprehensive way. According to the executive director of the CHSSP, "building a mission doesn't really teach [students] anything" and "is offensive to many".

Despite the new framework, the mission project continues to be done in certain elementary schools.
