= Biological museum (Stockholm) =

Biological museum in Djurgården, Stockholm, Sweden

Coordinates: 59°19′39″N 18°05′51″E

The Biological Museum
- Biologiska museet
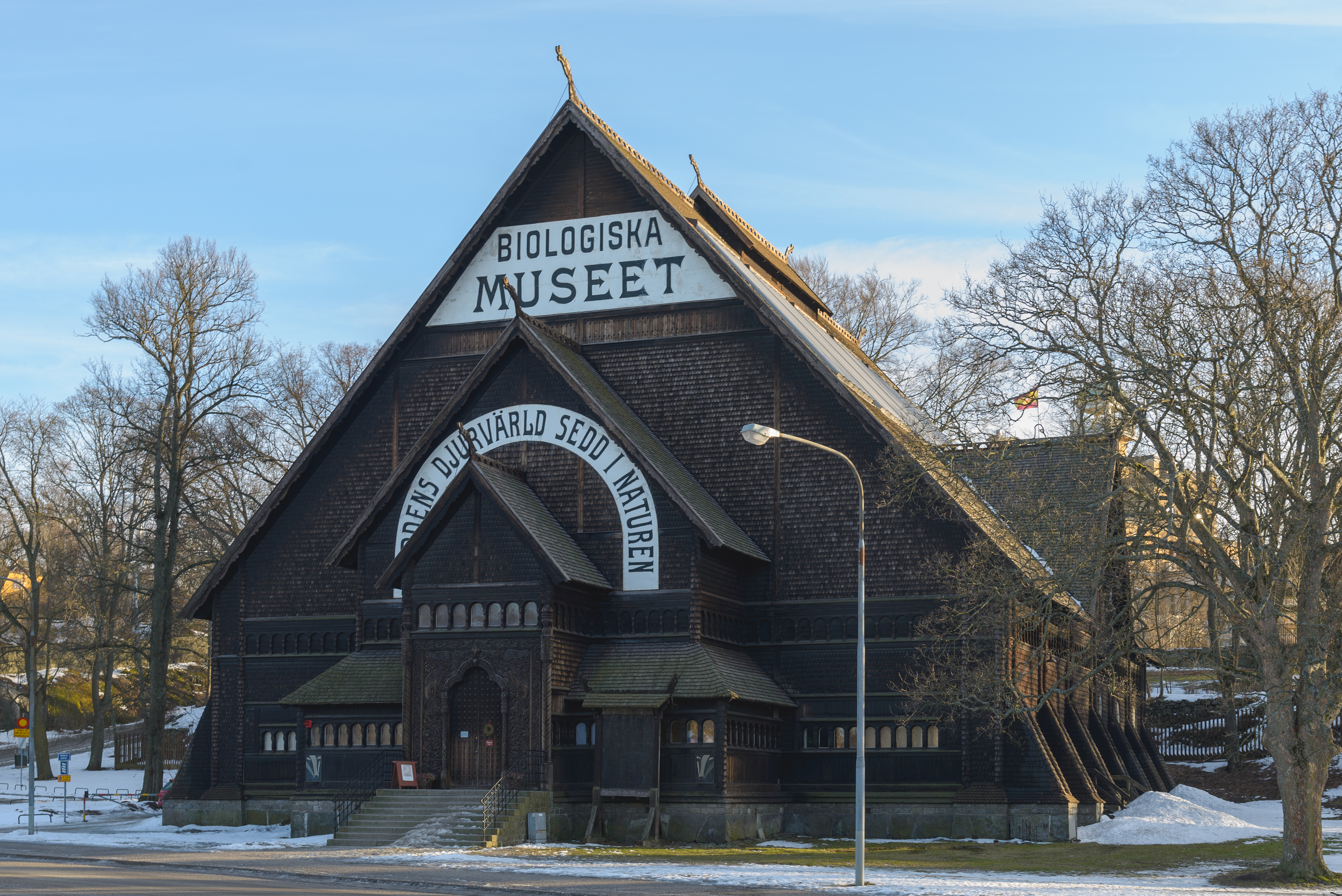
- Biologiska museet's wooden exterior
- Established: November 11, 1893
- Location: Hazeliusporten, Djurgården in Stockholm, Sweden.
- Public transit access: Bus 47 or 44, bus stop Hazeliusporten.
- Website: www.skansen.se/sv/biologiska-museet

Biologiska museet is a museum located in Djurgården in Stockholm. It exhibits a collection of stuffed European birds and mammals in dioramas. Some of the diorama backgrounds were created by artist Bruno Liljefors, known for his dramatic paintings of Scandinavian wildlife. The museum was built in 1893 after a design by architect Agi Lindegren who was inspired by medieval Norwegian stave churches.

== Gallery, building ==
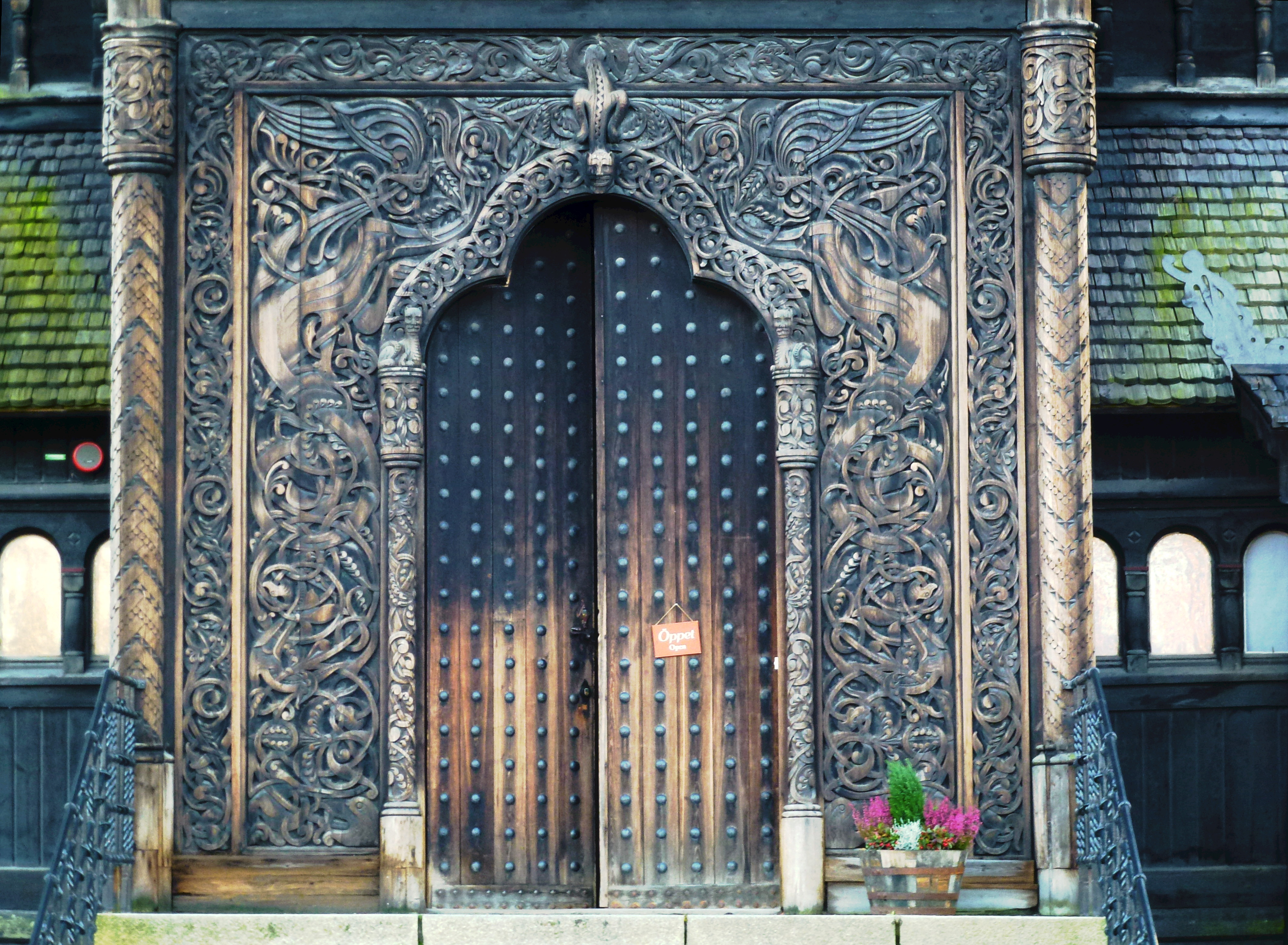

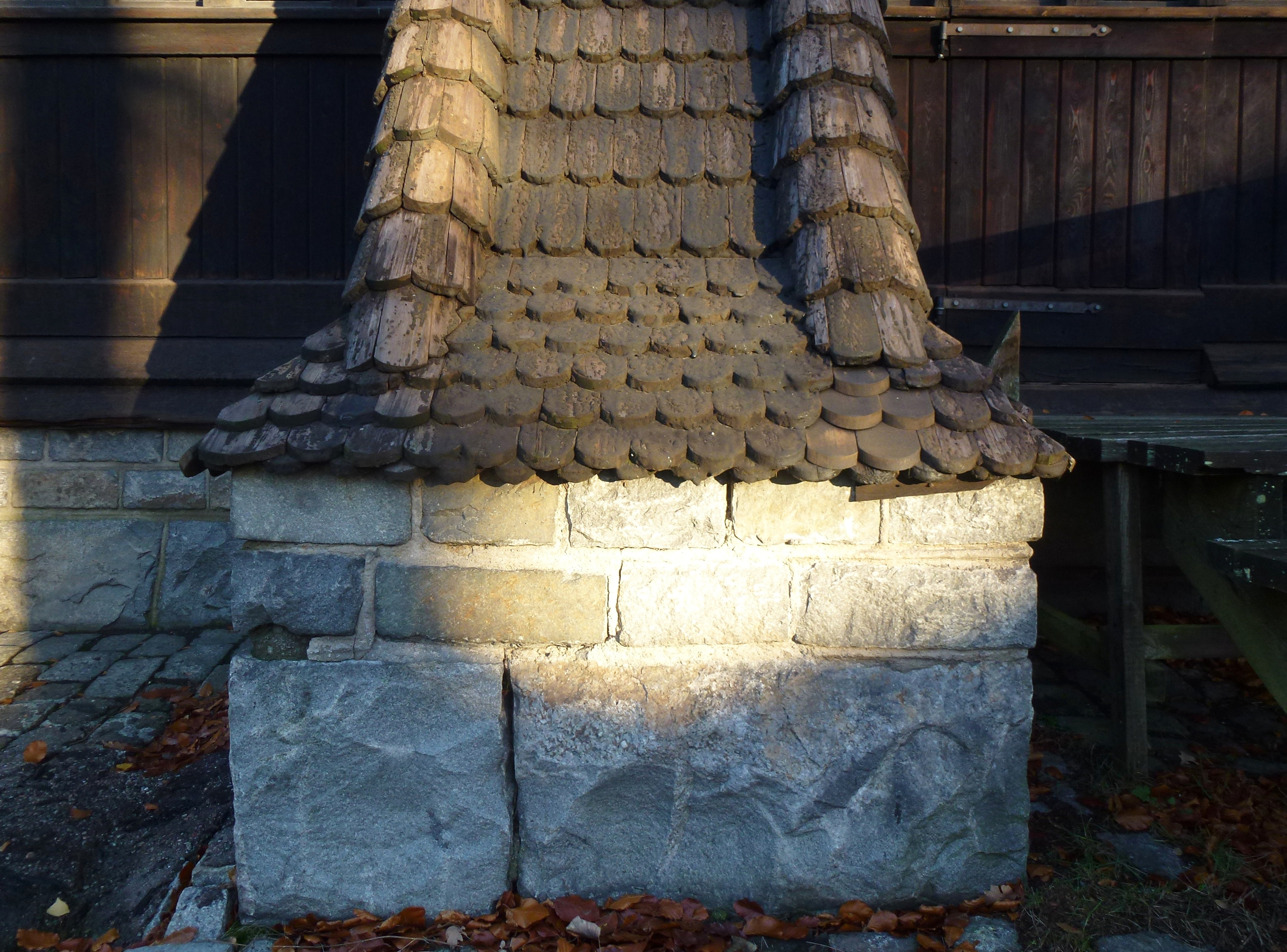

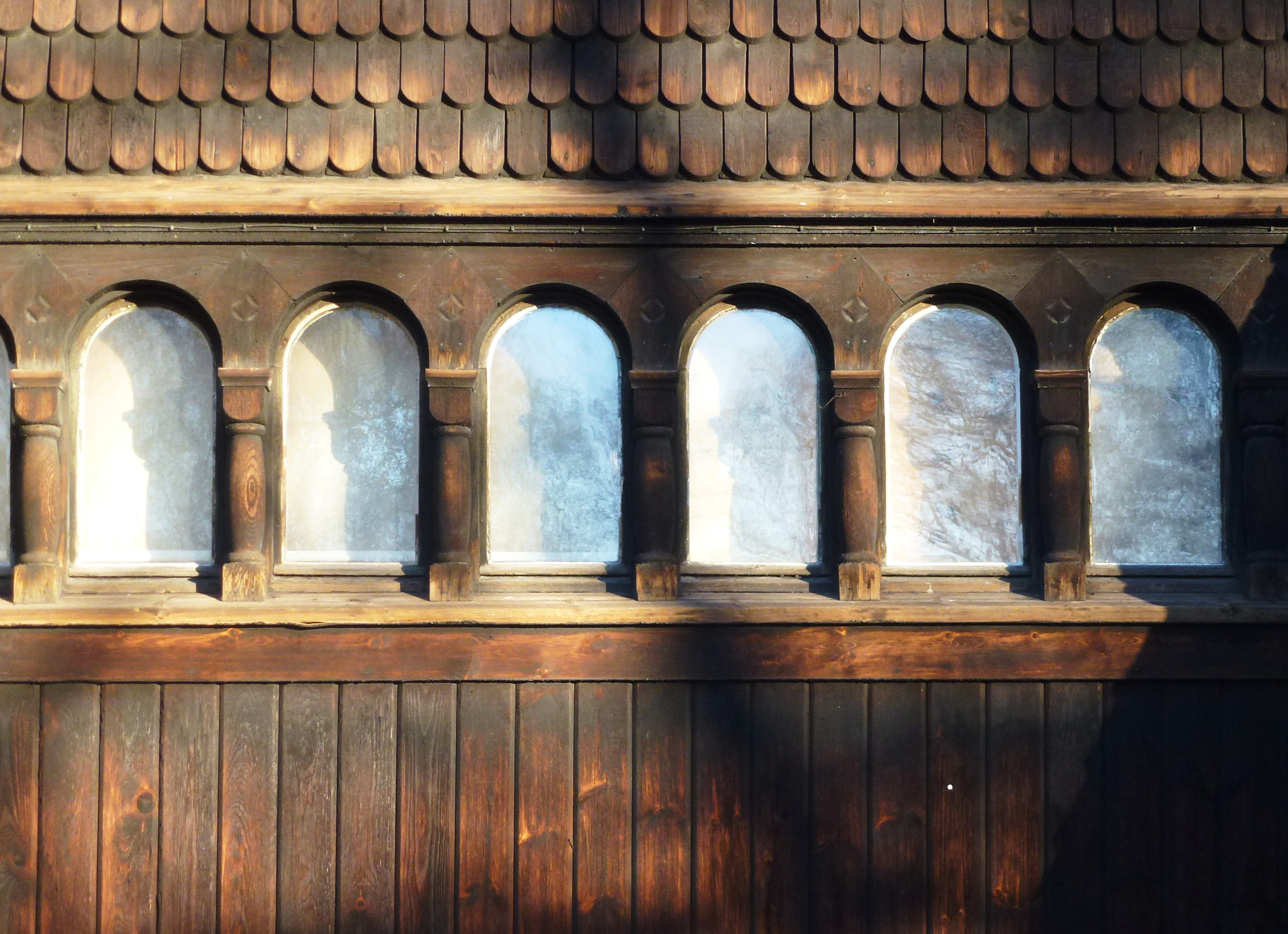

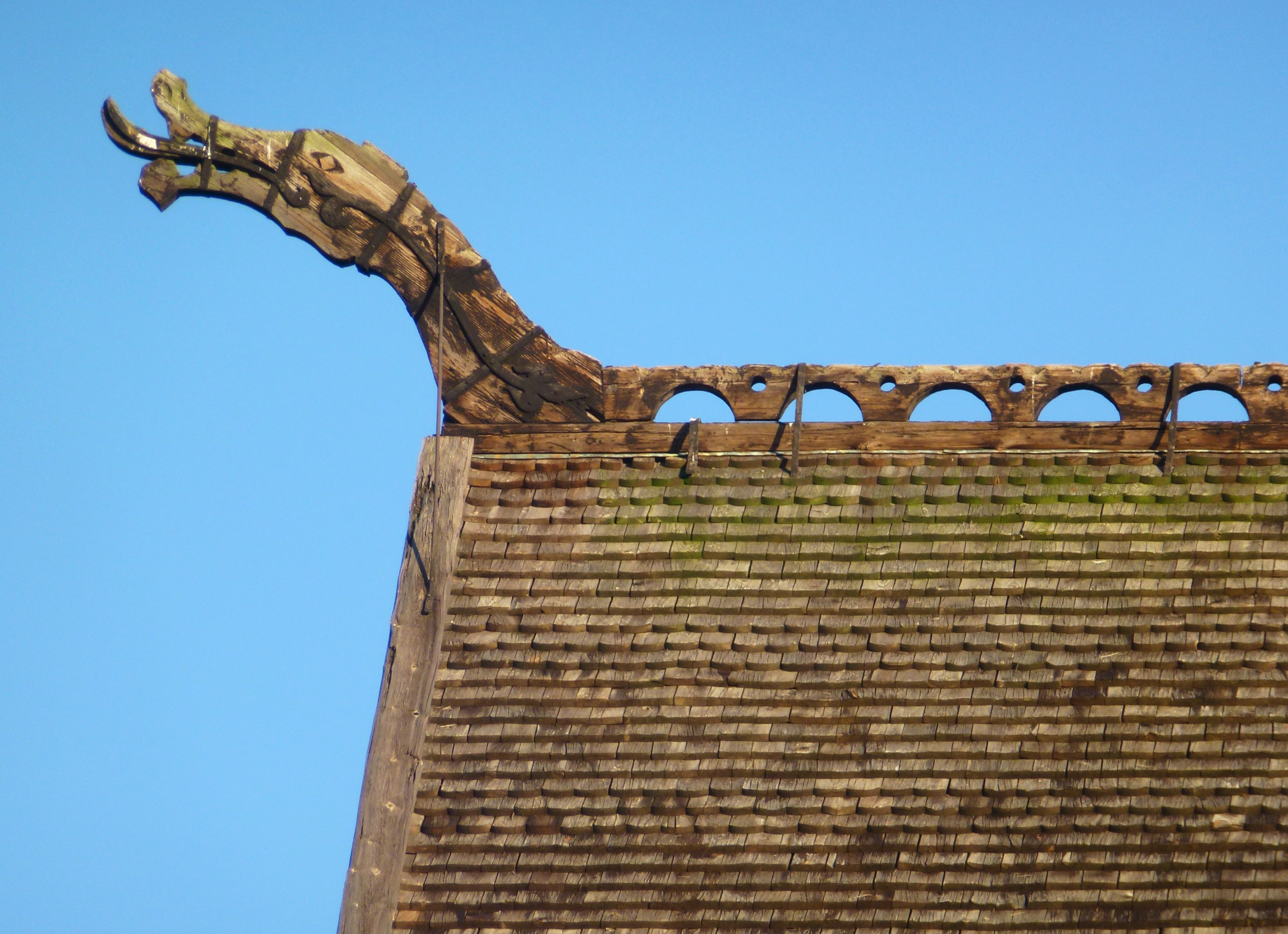

== Gallery, interior ==
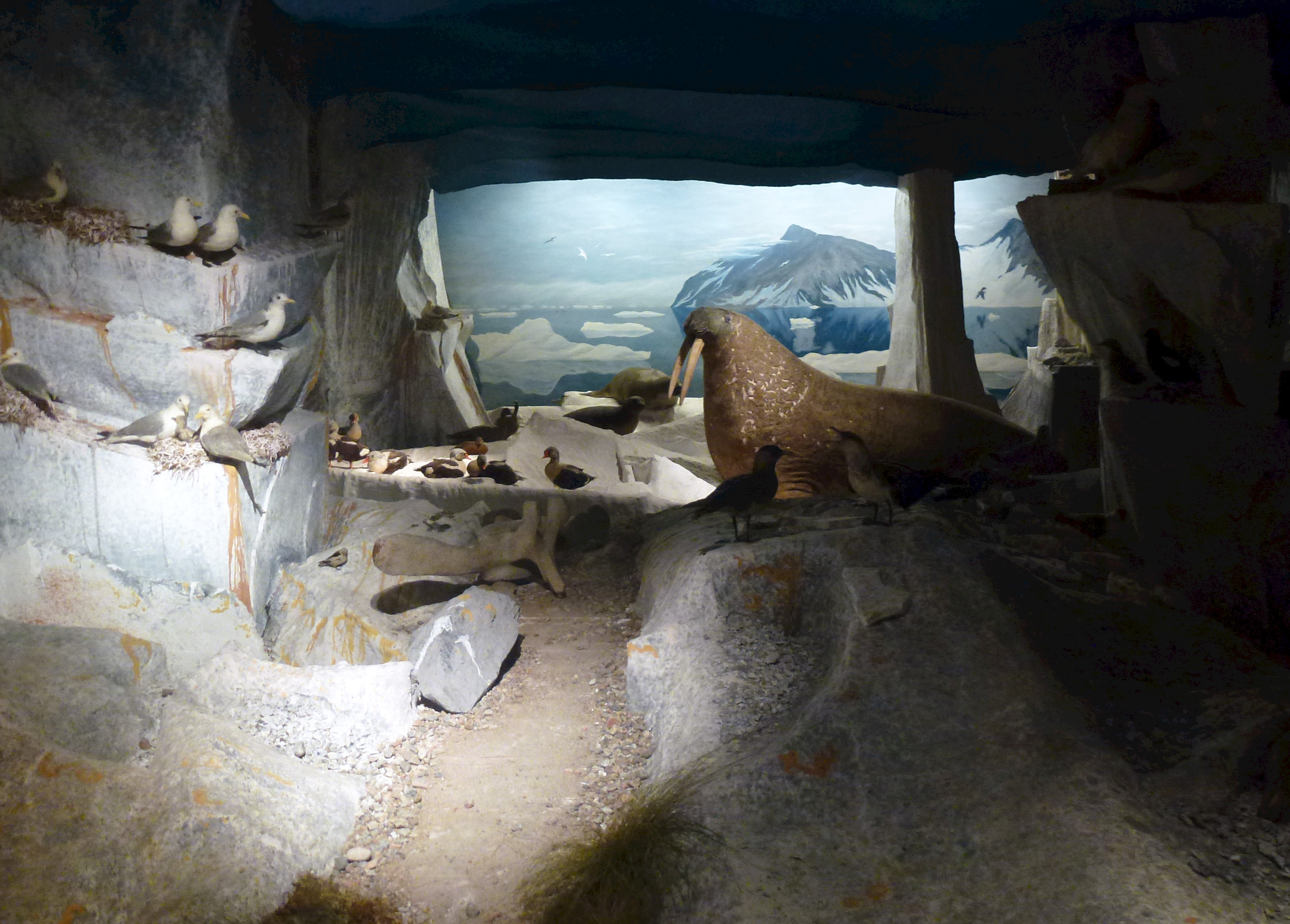

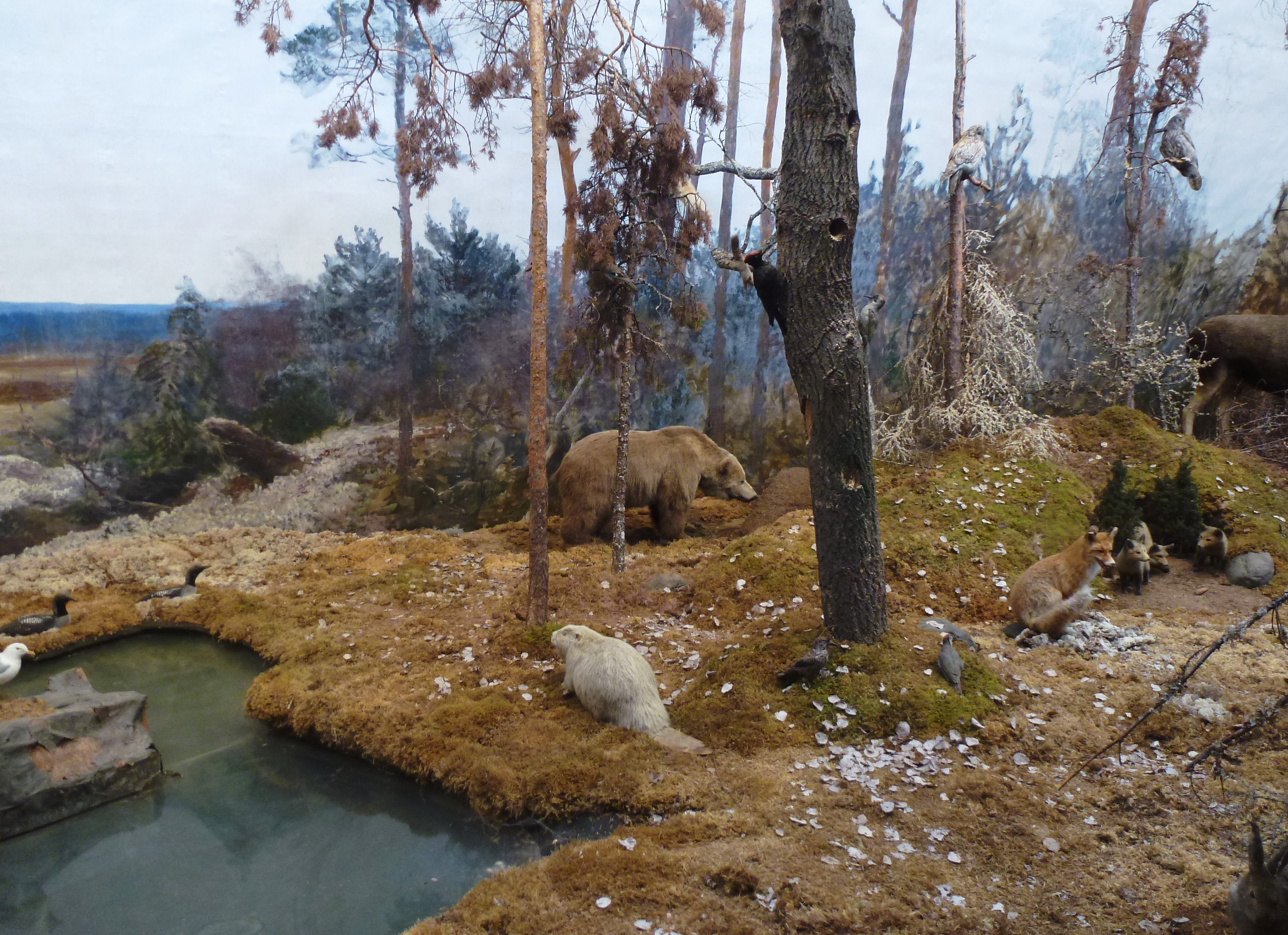

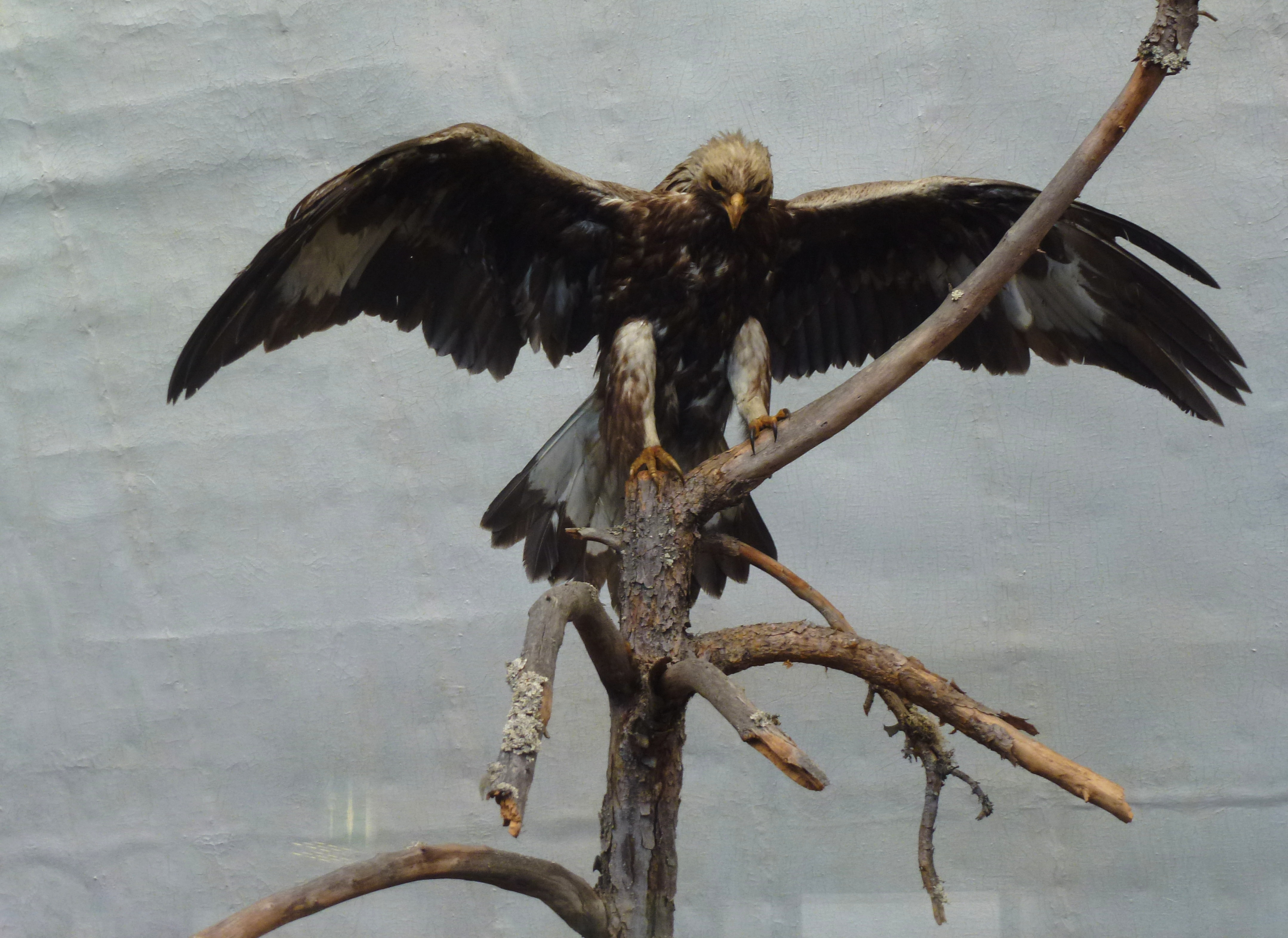

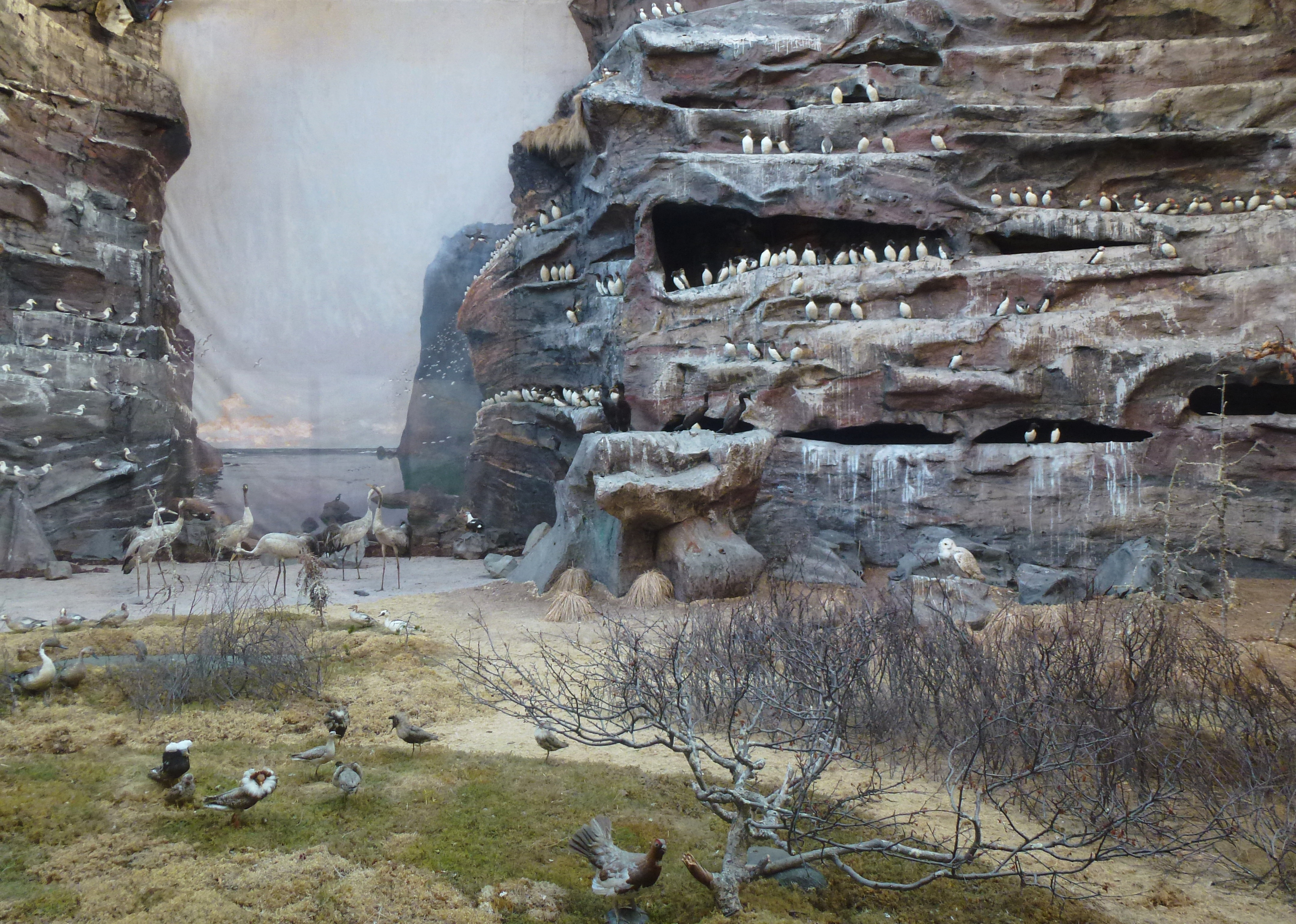

== See also ==
- Museums in Stockholm
