= Charles Marie Bouton =

French painter (1781–1853)

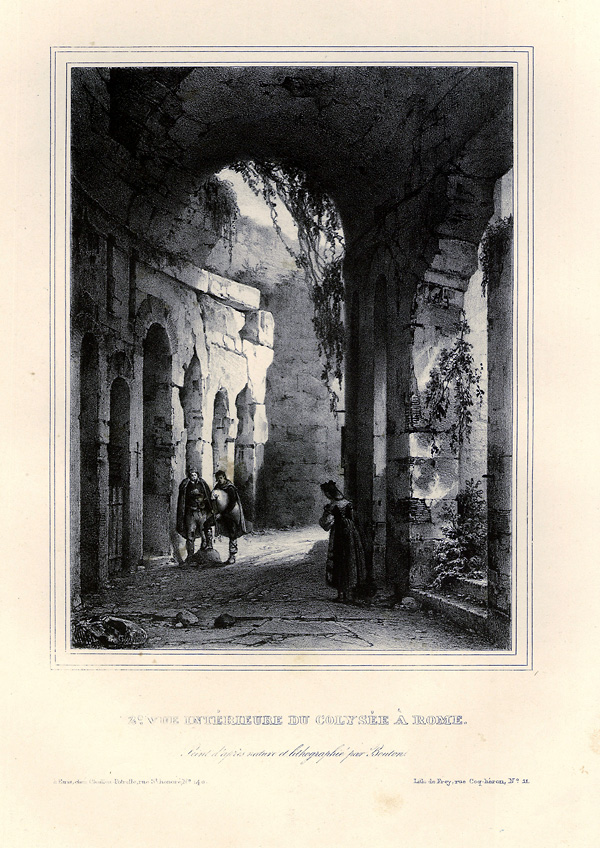
Interior view of the Colosseum

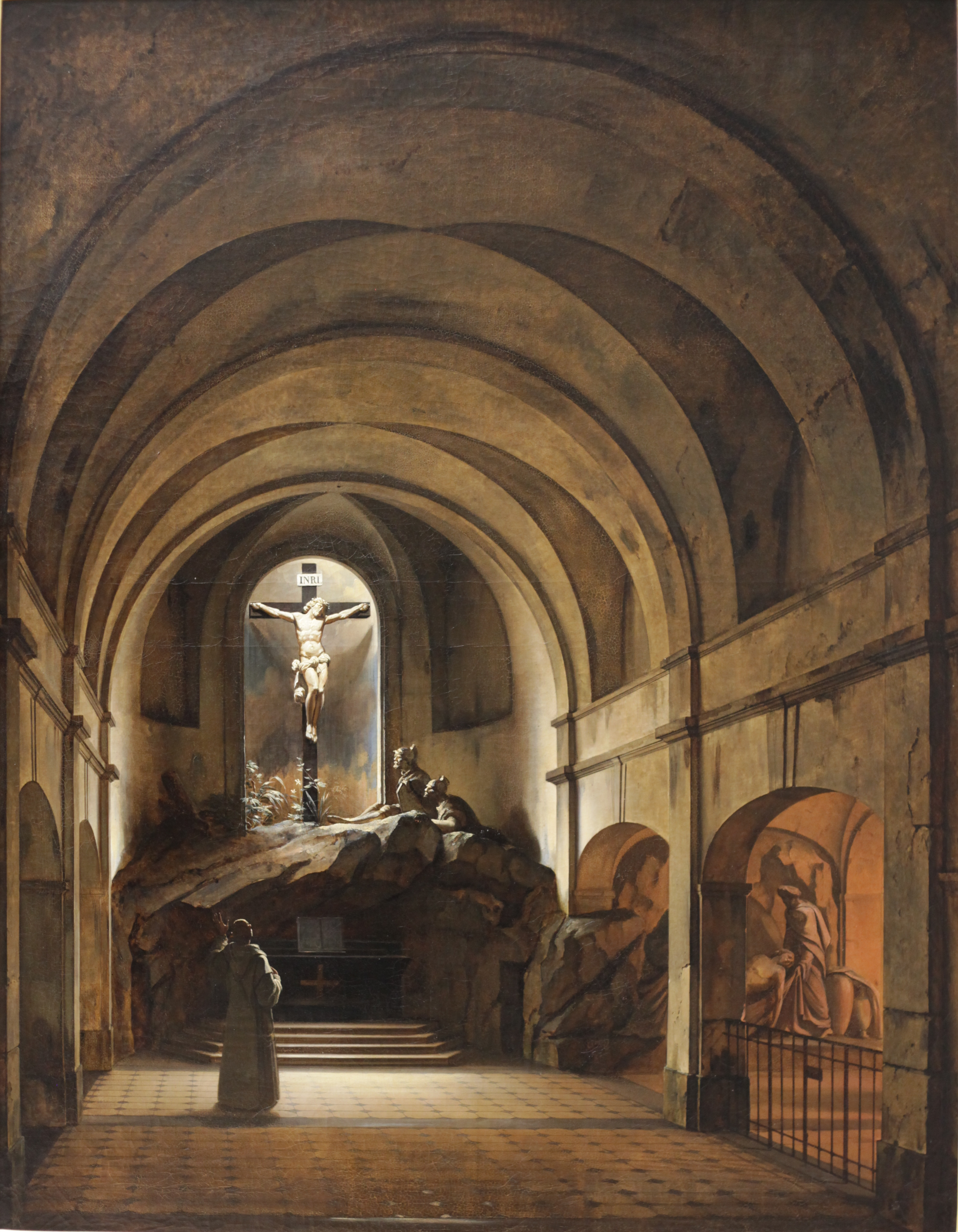
Calvary Chapel in the Church of St. Roch (1817)

Charles Marie Bouton (16 May 1781 – 28 June 1853) was a French painter. A student of Jacques-Louis David, Jean-Victor Bertin and the first French panorama painter Pierre Prévost, he concentrated mostly on the perspective and the art of distributing light and was thus led to the invention of the Diorama, which he shares the honor with Jacques Daguerre.

Among his paintings are Souterrains de Saint-Denis (1810), Vue de la cathédrale de Chartres (1833), and an Interior view of the church of Saint-Etienne-du-Mont (1842).

== Sources ==
- Pierre Defer, General Catalogue of auctions of paintings and prints from 1737 to the present day, Paris, Aubry, 1868, 90–3.
