= Frank Wong =

California artist (born 1934)

Frank Wong (born September 22, 1934) is a San Francisco, California artist who creates miniature dioramas that depict the San Francisco Chinatown of Wong's youth during the 1930s and 1940s. His works include his grandmother's kitchen, the family's living room at Christmas, an herb shop, Chinese laundry, shoeshine stand, and life in a single room occupancy hotel common in Chinatown.

== Early life and career ==
Frank Wong was born in Los Angeles, California on September 22, 1934. His family moved to Chinatown in San Francisco shortly after his birth. After high school, Wong enlisted in the U.S. Navy. Following a 4-year stint, he settled in Honolulu, Hawaii and found work making props for a costume store and magicians. Eventually, he became a prop master for film and television productions including Magnum, P.I..

In the late 1980s, Wong became homesick for San Francisco and he moved back to the city. However, the city of Wong's youth had changed and his family had moved on.

During a visit to the Chinese Historical Society of America (CHSA) in San Francisco, Wong learned that few images of old Chinatown existed, and he began creating memories of his youth in miniature dioramas. Wong conducted research at the San Francisco Public Library's Chinatown branch and referenced old Sears catalogs for product label accuracy.

In 2004, Wong donated seven miniatures of scenes of Chinatown, titled "The Chinatown Miniatures Collection", to CHSA. The dioramas include "The Moon Festival", "Shoeshine Stand", "Chinese New Year", "Chinese Laundry", "Christmas Scene", "Single Room", and "Herb Store", and are on permanent display in CHSA's Main Gallery.

=== Methods ===
Wong constructs his dioramas around a single remembered object from his youth, such as an herb chopper, his grandmother's apron, or a sign on a laundry door. Wong creatively employs materials such as plastic tubing to make soup or chili cans, balsa wood to fashion tables, and toothpicks for siding. His dioramas are scaled one inch to one foot.

=== Documentary film ===
San Francisco filmmakers James Chan and Corey Tong made "Forever, Chinatown", a documentary about Wong and the "changing landscape of Chinatown" in San Francisco.

In 2016, the first screening of the nearly-completed documentary was shown at CAAMFest, a celebration of Asian American film, music and food, in San Francisco. The completed documentary aired on PBS in the USA and is available to stream worldwide on Kanopy.

== Personal life ==
Wong lives near San Francisco's Tenderloin District. He never married and has no children.

He said Flower Drum Song, the musical set in San Francisco's Chinatown by Richard Rodgers and Oscar Hammerstein, based on the 1957 novel, The Flower Drum Song, by Chinese-American author C. Y. Lee, "was my life...That was me as a teenage kid".

Wong met Orson Welles and Rita Hayworth on the San Francisco set of the 1948 film noir production, The Lady from Shanghai.
