= List of buildings in Bodie, California =

The following is a list of buildings in Bodie, California. It largely follows the self-guided walking tour in the official guide provided by California State Parks. Some buildings have also been documented by Heritage Documentation Programs of the National Park Service.

Name	Picture	Description	HABS/HAER No.
McDonell/Dolan House		Donald and Mary McDonnell lived here with their son Frank around 1920, and later schoolteacher Alice Dolan lived here from 1935 to 1937.	
Methodist Church		The church was built in 1882 and is the only one left in Bodie.	HABS CA-1924
D. V. Cain House		This was built in 1873 and housed David Victor Cain and his wife Ella M. Cody.	HABS CA-1921
Red Barn		While faded over time, there is still some red paint left on the barn.	
Miller House		Tom and Jessie Miller lived here with their two children. Tom worked as a teamster for the Bodie Railway and Lumber Company.	
James Stuart Cain House		James S. Cain and his wife Martha Delilah Wells lived here. Cain was a lumber merchant and banker, owning many of the properties in Bodie.	HABS CA-1920
Saddle Room		This was owned by Harvey Boone, operator of a general store.	
Morgue		This mortuary still has caskets inside.	
Miners' Union Hall		This served as a gathering place for union members and was used to host large festivals. It has since been renovated into a museum and gift shop.	HABS CA-1919
I.O.O.F. Hall		The Independent Order of Odd Fellows was a fraternal society that operated in Bodie.	
DeChambeau Hotel		As of 1879, it was initially a post office, but it later became a hotel and finally a bar and café.	
County Barn			
Swasey (Swazey) Hotel		Horace F. Swasey bought this building in 1894. Later it became a clothing store and casino.	
Boone Store and Warehouse		Harvey Boone and James W. Wright operated this general store, which had a Shell gas station adjacent to the right.	HABS CA-1932
Lottie and Eli Johl House		The Johls were successful mining investors who purchased many properties in Bodie. This building housed the post office from 1932 to 1942.	HABS CA-1922
Sam Leon's Bar		Sam Leon was owner of the U.S. Hotel until it was destroyed in a 1932 fire. In 1937 he opened a bar in this location.	
Joe Hahner Barber Shop		Joe Hahner was the last barber to work in Bodie.	
Firehouse		Bodie was subject to frequent fires, most notably in 1892 and 1932. The California Conservation Corps rebuilt this building in the 1930s.	
Wheaton and Luhrs		George H. Wheaton and Nicholas C. Luhrs operated a general store here in the 1880s, which was later purchased by James Cain in 1898.	
Hydroelectric Building		This was an electricity substation for the town.	
Schoolhouse		Having reached a maximum enrollment of 615 in 1879-1880, the school finally shut down in 1942.	HABS CA-1934
Gregory House		Nathan Gregory was a cattle rancher who lived here with his wife Catherine and their four children.	
McMillan House		A. E. McMillan served as secretary of the Bodie Miners' Union.	
Miller Boarding House		William and Annie Currie Miller ran this boarding house, providing lodging primarily to single miners.	
Conway House		Thomas Robert and Annie Conway lived here with their three children.	
Dr. Street's House		John A. Street worked as a doctor for the Treadwell-Yukon Mining Company from 1930 to 1932.	
Quinville House		Frank F. Quinville, a blacksmith, lived here with his wife Mary and their five children.	
Standard Mill		The Standard Consolidated Mining Company was the most important mining company in Bodie, and this was their stamp mill. This area has been deemed unsafe and visitors may not enter except as part of a guided tour.	HAER CA-299
Chinese Laundry		Previously this site was home to Bodie's Masonic Hall, Lodge No. 252, but a laundry building was moved here after the lodge was consolidated with the one in Bishop in 1918.	
Bodie Bank		The ruins consist of the bank's brick vault, the only thing left after it was destroyed by a fire in 1932.	HABS CA-1926
Kirkwood Stable		Stewart Kirkwood ran a stable with a blacksmith shop inside. Horses and mules were used to transport goods on wagons.	
Jail		Constable John Kirgan ran the jail from 1878 to 1881.	HABS CA-1925
Moyle House (north)		The Moyle family owned two houses, the other one further south.	
Stewart Kirkwood House		In addition to running the stables, Kirkwood was also a deputy sheriff.	
Bell Machine Shop		Son of Lester Bell, Bobby Bell worked in mining and assisted in the establishment of the state park.	
Reddy House		Patrick Reddy was a California State Senator and defense attorney who had offices in both Bodie and San Francisco.	
Murphy/McRae House		The 1880 census identified this as the Murphy house, but it is unknown who exactly lived here out of the many Murphys. Carpenter William McRae was the last known resident.	HABS CA-1935
Cody House		Michael J. Cody, a miner and Mono County Sheriff, lived here with his wife Catherine and their six children.	
Menesini House		Joseph and Fortunata Menesini lived here with their daughter.	
Lester E. Bell House		Bell managed Standard's cyanide plant, which used cyanide to extract gold from low-grade ore.	
Cameron House		Andrew P. Cameron, a miner, lived here with his wife and two children.	
Seiler House		August Seiler, a saloonkeeper, lived here with his wife Theresa and four children.	
Donnelly House		Charlie Donnelly and his wife Annie Pagdin lived here, and afterwards Emil W. and Dolly Billeb moved in.	
Sawmill		The sawmill provided firewood to help residents endure Bodie's harsh winters.	
McDonald House		Dan McDonald worked for Standard, where he was injured in an explosion. Later Solomon Burkham came to own this place.	
Metzger House		Henry Metzger, foreman of Standard Mill, lived here with his wife Lena and their five children.	
