= 2007 New Zealand rugby league season =

Seasons
- 2006 2008

The 2007 New Zealand rugby league season was the 100th season of rugby league that had been played in New Zealand. The main feature of the year was the eighth season of the Bartercard Cup competition that was run by the New Zealand Rugby League. The Auckland Lions won the Cup by defeating Harbour League 28-4 in the Grand Final.

== International competitions ==
The New Zealand national rugby league team played one test match in New Zealand, losing to Australia. They then embarked on the 2007 All Golds Tour to celebrate the centenary of international rugby league. The touring squad was coached by Gary Kemble and included: Louis Anderson, captain Roy Asotasi, Luke Covell, Greg Eastwood, David Faiumu, Dene Halatau, Shontayne Hape, Lance Hohaia, Krisnan Inu, Shaun Kenny-Dowall, Epalahame Lauaki, Thomas Leuluai, Jeff Lima, Simon Mannering, Steve Matai, Fuifui Moimoi, Sam Perrett, Frank Pritchard, Sam Rapira, Ben Roberts, Jeremy Smith, Jeremy Smith, Chase Stanley, Clinton Toopi, Taniela Tuiaki, Tame Tupou and Paul Whatuira. In addition Nigel Vagana, Clinton Toopi, Stacey Jones, Ruben Wiki, Steve Price, Ali Lauitiiti, David Kidwell, Jason Cayless and Awen Guttenbeil played for the All Golds in a celebration match. Wayne Bennett coached the All Golds side.

Earlier in the year the Kiwis had lost the ANZAC Test 6-30. Jake Webster, Manu Vatuvei, Benji Marshall, Nathan Cayless, Sonny Bill Williams, Tony Puletua, David Fa'alogo and Iosia Soliola played in the ANZAC Test but did not tour at the end of the year.

The amateur Irish Wolfhounds toured New Zealand in May–June, defeating Bay of Plenty but losing to Whangarei Marists and Auckland Marists. They were coached by ex-pat Tony Benson.

== National competitions ==
=== Rugby League Cup ===
The Hawke's Bay defeated Gisborne Tairawhiti 58-6 on 15 September 2007. Canterbury B then defeated the Hawke's Bay to win the Rugby League Cup. The Hawke's Bay Unicorns included Elijah Niko.

=== Bartercard Cup ===
The 2007 season was the eighth and final season of the Bartercard Cup run by the New Zealand Rugby League. From 2008 onwards the NZRL was to revert to a more traditional provincial competition. There were no major team changes however the Tamaki Leopards were renamed the Tamaki Titans and the Auckland Lions also fielded a team in the NSWRL Premier League. As a result, less players from the New Zealand Warriors featured in the Bartercard Cup.

A Saturday double header took place each weekend with one game screened live on Māori Television and the other one delayed on a Sunday. This replaced 2006's Monday Night Football, a move welcomed by Canterbury Bulls head coach Brent Stuart. The double header was held at either Mt Smart Stadium or North Harbour Stadium each weekend. There was only one Split Round (Round Eight over Queens Birthday Weekend) which meant the Grand Final was played in September.

==== The Teams ====
- Harbour were coached by Ken McIntosh and Jason Lowrie and included Shaun Metcalf and Jeremiah Pai.
- Waitakere were coached by Bernie Perenara and included Cliff Beverley, Karl Guttenbeil, Roman Hifo, Pita Godinet, Jaye Pukepuke and Gavin Bailey.
- Auckland were coached by Brent Gemmell and included David and Paul Fisiiahi, Andrew Suniula, Martin Mitchell, Kimi Uasi, Julian O'Neill, Matthew Sturm and Daniel O’Regan.
- Tamaki were coached by Dean Clark and included Elijah Taylor, Constantine Mika, Leeson Ah Mau, Willie Heta and Aaron Pawley.
- Counties Manukau included Ian Hayes, Aidan Kirk, Michael Crockett, Sonny Fai and Tulson Caird.
- Waicoa Bay included Steve Rapira and Isaac John.
- Central were coached by David Lomax and included Elijah Niko.
- Wellington were coached by Paul Bergman and included Alehana Mara, Meli Koliavu, Mose Masoe and Ben Matulino.
- Canterbury were coached by former Kiwi Brent Stuart and included Lusi Sione, Corey Lawrie and Shane Beyers.

==== Season standings ====
Team	Pld	W	D	L	PF	PA	PD	Pts
Auckland Lions	18	16	1	1	888	217	617	33
Harbour League	18	15	1	2	630	322	308	31
Canterbury Bulls	18	12	0	6	663	426	207	24
Waitakere Rangers	18	11	1	6	638	430	208	23
Tamaki Titans	18	10	1	7	526	464	62	21
Wellington Orcas	18	10	0	8	509	529	-20	20
Waicoa Bay Stallions	18	5	1	12	418	682	-264	11
Northern Storm	18	4	0	14	372	730	-358	8
Counties Manukau Jetz	18	3	0	15	344	704	-360	6
Central Falcons	18	1	1	16	384	868	-484	3

==== The playoffs ====
The Bartercard Cup used the Page–McIntyre system in 2007. In the major semi-final at Waitemata Stadium, between the Auckland Lions and Harbour League the scores were tied at 40 all after normal time and 2 further periods of extra time. The game proceeded to go on for another 17 minutes and 16 seconds before Auckland finally scored the winning try. NZRL management believed that no game of rugby league has ever lasted that long, or at least certainly in modern times. This record was broken by the 2014 Group 21 Rugby League Grand Final between Scone and Denman, which lasted 125 minutes.

Semifinals
1	Auckland Lions	44
2	Harbour League	40
3	Canterbury Bulls	35
4	Waitakere Rangers	18

Preliminary Final
2	Harbour League	28
3	Canterbury Bulls	24

Grand Final
1	Auckland Lions	28
2	Harbour League	4

Date	Match	Winner		Loser		Venue
25 August	Elimination Semifinal	Canterbury Bulls	35	Waitakere Rangers	18	Waitemata Stadium
25 August	Qualification Semifinal	Auckland Lions	44	Harbour League	40	Waitemata Stadium
1 September	Preliminary Final	Harbour League	28	Canterbury Bulls	24	Waitemata Stadium

===== Grand final =====
Team	Halftime	Total
Auckland Lions	8	28
Harbour League	0	4

Tries (Auckland)	1: D. Fisiiahi, A. Suniula, M. Weepu, M. Mitchell, J. O'Neil
Tries (Harbour League)	1: T.Samoa
Goals (Auckland)	4: H. Mathews
Goals (Harbour League)	0
Date	9 September
Venue	Mt Smart Stadium
Broadcast	Māori Television

=== Provincial tour ===
Auckland conducted a Queen's Birthday weekend tour of the South Island. The team was coached by Sam Panapa. The team defeated a West Coast Invitational XIII 26-20 and Canterbury 28-24.

=== South Island Zone Competition ===
The Southland Rams, Canterbury B, West Coast and Otago played a four team tournament in September and October.

=== National Club Competition ===
The Wainuiomata Lions defeated the Papakura Sea Eagles 48-26 in the Grand Final of the National Club Competition. Wainuiomata defeated Manurewa 40-18 in a semi final while Papakura defeated Kaiapoi 48-22.

== Australian competitions ==
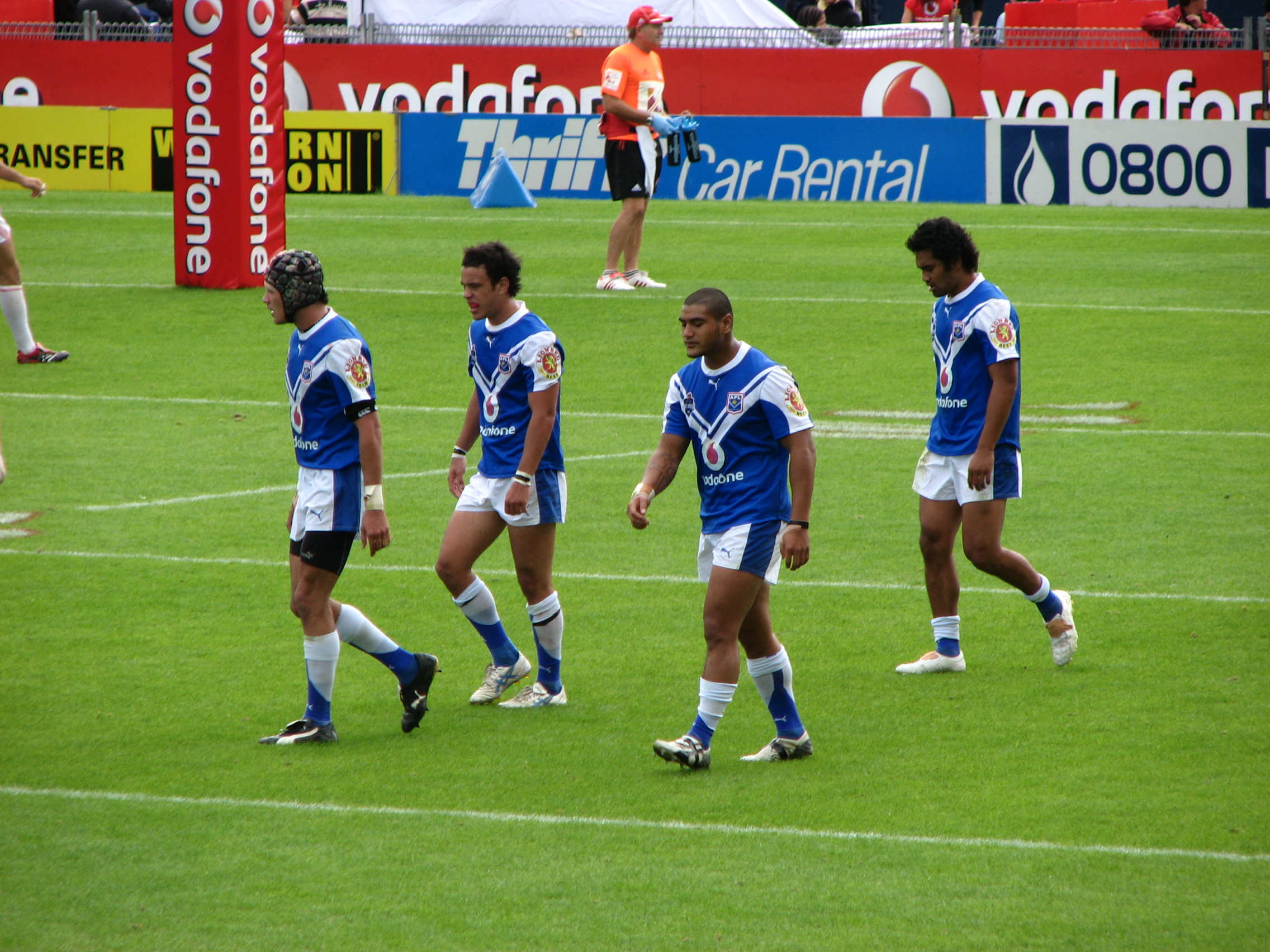
Auckland Lions Premier League players during at match against St George Illawarra

The New Zealand Warriors competed in the National Rugby League competition. They finished 4th out of 16 teams before losing to North Queensland in the Semi-finals.

The Auckland Lions competed in the NSWRL Premier League and finished 10th out of 13 teams.

== Club competitions ==
=== Auckland ===
The Manurewa Marlins won the Fox Memorial trophy, defeating the Papakura Sea Eagles 28-20 in extra time in the grand final. Papakura had finished the season as minor premiers. Richmond won the Stormont Shield.

The Northcote Tigers won the Sharman Cup (Division Two) while Ponsonby won the Phelan Shield (Division Three).

=== Wellington ===
The Wainuiomata Lions were coached by John Lomax. David Lomax stepped in as caretaker coach when his brother was unavailable.

The Wellington Rugby League board was given full control of its own competition on 1 April after being "in review" by the New Zealand Rugby League since January 2003.

=== Canterbury ===
Kaiapoi won the Canterbury Rugby League title.

=== Other Competitions ===
The Taniwharau Rugby League Club were the Waicoa Bay minor premiers and went on to win the grand final, defeating Turangawaewae. Taniwharau went through the season undefeated.

The Kia Ora Warriors defeated the Waitara Bears 29-20 in the Western Alliance grand final.

Preceded by 2006 Bartercard Cup	Bartercard Cup; 2007	Succeeded by 2008 Bartercard Premiership
