= List of Auckland Vulcans players =

This is an incomplete record of the rugby players who have represented the New Zealand rugby league team, Auckland Vulcans, in the NSW Cup. In 2007 the team was known as the Auckland Lions and competed in the NSWRL Premier League.

This list does not include Bartercard Cup caps.

Since 2007 four players have played for the Vulcans and the Junior Warriors and then gone on to make their National Rugby League debut with the New Zealand Warriors. They are Russell Packer, Daniel O'Regan, Sonny Fai and Leeson Ah Mau.

In addition to this Ukuma Ta'ai, Malo Solomona, Aidan Kirk and Corey Lawrie have all played for the Vulcans and then made their first grade debut for the Warriors.

== List of players ==
NRL Statistics are accurate to 31 December 2009

Nationality	Name	Position	Debut	Seasons	ARL Club	NRL & SL Games	Warriors debut
(New Zealand)	Patrick Kapi	FB	17 March 2007	2007		0	
(Samoa)	Malo Solomona	WG	17 March 2007	2007–2009	Ponsonby Ponies	8	29 June 2008
(Australia)	Todd Byrne	CE	17 March 2007	2007	New Zealand Warriors	128	13 March 2005
(New Zealand)	Constantine Mika	CE	17 March 2007	2007–2008	New Zealand Warriors	2	
(Tonga)	Cooper Vuna	UB	17 March 2007	2007	New Zealand Warriors	37	21 August 2004
(New Zealand)	Steve Buckingham	FE	17 March 2007	2007	Auckland Lions	2	17 March 1997
(New Zealand)	Isaac John	HB	17 March 2007	2007–2010	Waicoa Bay Stallions	3	19 July 2009
(New Zealand)	Russell Packer	PR	17 March 2007	2007	Central Falcons	26	4 May 2008
(New Zealand)	Kelvin Wright	HB	17 March 2007	2007-2010		0	
(New Zealand)	Evarn Tuimavave	PR	17 March 2007	2007–2009	New Zealand Warriors	101	1 September 2002
(New Zealand)	Scott Jones	SR	17 March 2007	2007–2008	Waitakere Rangers	0	
(New Zealand)	Sonny Fai	SR	17 March 2007	2007	Counties Manukau Jetz	15	23 March 2008
(New Zealand)	Corey Lawrie	LK	17 March 2007	2007	Canterbury Bulls	4	15 April 2007
(New Zealand)	Simon Head	HK	17 March 2007	2007		0	
(New Zealand)	Shannon Stowers	SR	17 March 2007	2007–2009	Marist Saints	2	20 June 2004
(New Zealand)	Lui Toimoana	CE	17 March 2007	2007		0	
(Samoa)	Wayne McDade	PR	17 March 2007	2007–2009	Mt Albert Lions	0	
(New Zealand)	David Fisi'iahi	WG	25 March 2007	2007		0	
(New Zealand)	Leeson Ah Mau	PR	25 March 2007	2007	Otahuhu Leopards	2	14 March 2009
(New Zealand)	Jaye Pukepuke		25 March 2007	2007	Waitakere Rangers	0	
(New Zealand)	Fabian Soutar	SR	25 March 2007	2007	Mt Albert Lions	0	
(New Zealand)	Patrick Ah Van	WG	1 April 2007	2007–2010	New Zealand Warriors	53	9 April 2006
(Tonga)	Eliakim Uasi	HK	1 April 2007	2007–2008	Mt Albert Lions	0	
(New Zealand)	Mataupu Poching	PR	1 April 2007	2007–2010	Mangere East Hawks	0	15 May 2010
(Samoa)	Miguel Start	CE	15 April 2007	2007	Pakuranga Jaguars	0	
(Australia)	Aidan Kirk	UB	29 April 2007	2007–2009	New Zealand Warriors	20	17 March 2008
(New Zealand)	Jerome Ropati	FE	29 April 2007	2007	New Zealand Warriors	108	31 August 2003
(New Zealand)	Louis Anderson	LK	29 April 2007	2007	New Zealand Warriors	111	28 March 2004
(New Zealand)	Andrew Suniula	WG	5 May 2007	2007		4	
(Australia)	George Gatis	HK	5 May 2007	2007	New Zealand Warriors	74	25 March 2006
(New Zealand)	Toleafoa Leaupepe	SR	5 May 2007	2007–2008		0	
(New Zealand)	Epalahame Lauaki	SR	12 May 2007	2007–2008	New Zealand Warriors	72	14 March 2004
(New Zealand)	Wairangi Koopu	SR	12 May 2007	2007–2008	New Zealand Warriors	168	9 April 1999
(Australia)	Grant Rovelli	HB	20 May 2007	2007–2008	New Zealand Warriors	80	12 March 2006
(Australia)	Michael Crockett	WG	28 May 2007	2007–2008	New Zealand Warriors	28	17 March 2007
(New Zealand)	Kevin Locke	FB/WG	3 June 2007	2007-2010	Northcote Tigers	9	31 May 2009
(New Zealand)	Marty Mitchell	HB	10 June 2007	2007	Mt Albert Lions	0	
(New Zealand)	Lance Hohaia	UB	16 June 2007	2007	New Zealand Warriors	140	6 April 2002
(New Zealand)	Paora Packer	SR	23 June 2007	2007	Central Falcons	0	
(New Zealand)	Raymond Ioane	FB	15 March 2008	2008–2009	Marist Saints	0	
(New Zealand)	Shaun Metcalf	CE	15 March 2008	2008–2010	Marist Saints	0	
(New Zealand)	Ryan Shortland	CE	15 March 2008	2008	New Zealand Warriors	6	6 April 2008
(New Zealand)	Aaron Heremaia	HB	15 March 2008	2008–2009	Manurewa Marlins	11	31 May 2009
(New Zealand)	Pita Godinet	HB/HK	15 March 2008	2008–2010	Richmond Bulldogs	0	
(New Zealand)	Herman Retzlaff	PR	15 March 2008	2008–2009	Pakuranga Jaguars	0	
(Scotland)	Ian Henderson	HK	15 March 2008	2008–2010	New Zealand Warriors	127	23 March 2008
(New Zealand)	Antonio Tusani		15 March 2008	2008		0	
(New Zealand)	Sione Taka	CE	15 March 2008	2008	Ponsonby Ponies	0	
(New Zealand)	Meke Unasa	CE	15 March 2008	2008		0	
(New Zealand)	William Heta	FE	23 March 2008	2008	Otahuhu Leopards	0	
(New Zealand)	Harry Aonga	HK	23 March 2008	2008		0	
(New Zealand)	Ralph Ah Van	SR	23 March 2008	2008–2010	Te Atatu Roosters	0	
(New Zealand)	Jeremiah Pai	LK	23 March 2008	2008–2009	Hibiscus Coast Raiders	2	21 July 2002
(New Zealand)	Dylan Moses		23 March 2008	2008	Northcote Tigers	0	
(New Zealand)	Dion Briggs		23 March 2008	2008		0	
(New Zealand)	Karl Guttenbeil	SR	29 March 2008	2008		0	
(New Zealand)	Arron Pawley	HK	29 March 2008	2008	Otahuhu Leopards	0	
(New Zealand)	Manu Pipitolu	LK	6 April 2008	2008	Ponsonby Ponies	0	
(New Zealand)	Jason Tou	HK	19 April 2008	2008		0	
(New Zealand)	Liu Faleono		10 May 2008	2008		0	
(New Zealand)	Henry Turua		23 May 2008	2008	Richmond Bulldogs	0	
(New Zealand)	Frank Perese		23 May 2008	2008	Manurewa Marlins	0	
(New Zealand)	Jason Cook	CE	31 May 2008	2008	Northcote Tigers	0	
(New Zealand)	Alehana Mara	HK	31 May 2008	2008–2010	Wellington Orcas	0	21 August 2010
(New Zealand)	Ruben Wiki	PR	31 May 2008	2008	New Zealand Warriors	315	13 March 2005
(Australia)	Michael Witt	FE	14 June 2008	2008–2009	New Zealand Warriors	90	17 March 2007
(New Zealand)	Paul Atkins	WG	28 June 2008	2008–2009	Howick Hornets	1	29 August 2004
(New Zealand)	Ian Hayes	SR	28 June 2008	2008–2010	Northcote Tigers	0	
(Tonga)	Ukuma Ta'ai	SR	2 August 2008	2008–2010	Mt Albert Lions	10	22 March 2009
(New Zealand)	Meli Koliavu	WG	16 August 2008	2008–2010	Wellington Orcas	0	
(New Zealand)	Nathaniel Neale	PR/LK	16 August 2008	2008–2010	Mt Albert Lions	0	
(New Zealand)	Kurt Kara	CE	30 August 2008	2008	Waicoa Bay Stallions	0	
(New Zealand)	Sione Tongia	CE	14 March 2009	2009–2010	Otahuhu Leopards	0	
(New Zealand)	Jesse Royal	PR	14 March 2009	2009	New Zealand Warriors	44	22 March 2009
(New Zealand)	Daniel O'Regan	LK	14 March 2009	2009	New Zealand Warriors	1	5 April 2009
(New Zealand)	Lewis Brown	HK/SR	14 March 2009	2009-2010	New Zealand Warriors	15	3 May 2009
(New Zealand)	Liam Foran	HB	14 March 2009	2009	New Zealand Warriors	3	
(New Zealand)	Vince Mellars	CE	29 March 2009	2009	East Coast Bays Barracudas	24	7 June 2003
(New Zealand)	Mark Phillips	PR	4 April 2009	2009	Howick Hornets	0	
(New Zealand)	Aletea Nafetalai	WG	26 April 2009	2009	Otahuhu Leopards	0	
(New Zealand)	Willie Morunga	HK	1 May 2009	2009	Pakuranga Jaguars	0	
(Australia)	Nathan Fien	HB	30 May 2009	2009	New Zealand Warriors	206	13 March 2005
(Australia)	Denan Kemp	WG	30 May 2009	2009	New Zealand Warriors	38	14 March 2009
(Australia)	Joel Moon	CE	12 June 2009	2009-2010	New Zealand Warriors	54	14 March 2009
(New Zealand)	Daniel McGregor	SR	17 July 2009	2009	Richmond Bulldogs	0	
(New Zealand)	Glen Fisiiahi	CE	17 July 2009	2009	Otahuhu Leopards	0	
(New Zealand)	Taavili Leaunoa	WG	17 July 2009	2009	Marist Saints	0	
(New Zealand)	Daniel Palavi	SR	17 July 2009	2009	Richmond Bulldogs	0	
(New Zealand)	Henry Heta	CE	24 July 2009	2009	Manurewa Marlins	0	
(New Zealand)	Terry Phillips	CE	31 July 2009	2009	Manurewa Marlins	0	
(Australia)	Wade McKinnon	FB	7 August 2009	2009	New Zealand Warriors	125	17 March 2007
(New Zealand)	Toshio Laiseni	CE	22 August 2009	2009–2010	Papakura Sea Eagles	1	
(New Zealand)	Kurt Tehira	LK	22 August 2009	2009–2010	Mt Albert Lions	0	
(New Zealand)	Ben McCallum	HK	29 August 2009	2009	Te Atatu Roosters	0	
(New Zealand)	Howie Matthews	FB/WG	14 March 2010	2010		0	
(New Zealand)	Nuivao Taka	CE	14 March 2010	2010		0	
(New Zealand)	Pauvoa Samoa	WG	14 March 2010	2010		0	
(New Zealand)	Michael Afioga	SR	14 March 2010	2010		0	
(New Zealand)	Soape Kavaliku		14 March 2010	2010	Mt Albert Lions	0	
(New Zealand)	Johnny Aranga	FB	14 March 2010	2010		0	
(New Zealand)	Fetongi Tuinauvai	WG	20 March 2010	2010		0	
(New Zealand)	Zensei Inu	HB	20 March 2010	2010	Te Atatu Roosters	0	
(New Zealand)	Feu'u-Siavea Seainafo		20 March 2010	2010		0	
(New Zealand)	Kitiona Pasene		20 March 2010	2010		0	
(New Zealand)	Tulson Caird	LK	27 March 2010	2010	Mt Albert Lions	0	
(New Zealand)	Dane Shelford	FE/HK	27 March 2010	2010		0	
(New Zealand)	Suaia Matagi	PR	3 April 2010	2010	Mt Albert Lions	0	
(New Zealand)	Sione Lousi	CE/SR	3 April 2010	2010		0	14 March 2010
(New Zealand)	James Gavet	PR	10 April 2010	2010		0	
(New Zealand)	Sialii Tufeo	SR	1 May 2010	2010	Te Atatu Roosters	0	
(New Zealand)	Beau King		1 May 2010	2010	Papakura Sea Eagles	0	
(New Zealand)	Jordan Tuarae	FE	15 May 2010	2010		0	
(New Zealand)	Darin Kingi	HK	22 May 2010	2010	Manurewa Marlins	0	
(New Zealand)	Jeremy Latimore	PR	22 May 2010	2010	New Zealand Warriors		14 March 2010
(New Zealand)	Elijah Niko	WG	5 June 2010	2010		0	
(New Zealand)	Francis Leger	FE	12 June 2010	2010		0	
(New Zealand)	Shaun Johnson	HB	19 June 2010	2010	New Zealand Warriors	0	
(New Zealand)	Joe Mua		17 July 2010	2010		0	
(New Zealand)	Jacob Lillyman	SR	17 July 2010	2010	New Zealand Warriors		14 March 2009

=== Positions ===
- FB – Fullback
- WG – Wing
- CE – Centre
- FE – Five-Eighth
- HB – Halfback
- PR – Prop
- HK – Hooker
- SR – Second-Row
- LK – Lock
- UB – Utility Back
- UH – Utility Half
