= 2006 New Zealand rugby league season =

Seasons
- 2005 2007

The 2006 New Zealand rugby league season was the 99th season of rugby league that had been played in New Zealand. The main feature of the year was the seventh season of the Bartercard Cup competition that was run by the New Zealand Rugby League. The Auckland Lions won the Cup by defeating the Canterbury Bulls 25–18 in the grand final.

== International competitions ==
The New Zealand national rugby league team co-hosted the Tri-Nations with Australia. Three tests were played in New Zealand; with the Kiwis defeating Great Britain 18–14 in Christchurch and 34–4 in Wellington and losing to Australia 18–30 in Auckland. New Zealand lost the final, which was played in Sydney, 16–12 to Australia after Golden Point extra time. The first win against Great Britain was discounted after it was discovered that Nathan Fien was ineligible to play for New Zealand. Coached by Brian McClennan, for the Tri-Nations New Zealand included; Roy Asotasi, Adam Blair, Jason and Nathan Cayless, David Fa'alogo, Nathan Fien, Dene Halatau, Shontayne Hape, Stacey Jones, David Kidwell, Simon Mannering, Steve Matai, Frank Pritchard, Tony Puletua, Jerome Ropati, Iosia Soliola, Motu Tony, Tame Tupou, Nigel Vagana, Manu Vatuvei, Brent Webb and captain Ruben Wiki.

Earlier in the year New Zealand had lost the ANZAC Test 12-50 to Australia and lost to Great Britain 14–46 in a June Test match. Jake Webster, Paul Whatuira, Thomas Leuluai, Sonny Bill Williams, Benji Marshall and David Faiumu all appeared in the ANZAC Test but did not make the Tri-Nations squad. Lesley Vainikolo, Willie Talau, Henry Fa'afili, Ben Roberts, Alex Chan, Iafeta Paleaaesina, Ali Lauiti'iti, David Solomona, Robbie Paul, Harrison Hansen and Monty Betham all appeared in the Great Britain Test but did not make the Tri-Nations squad. Clinton Toopi and Louis Anderson appeared in both mid-season Test matches but did not make the Tri-Nations squad.

2006-10-14
20:00 NZST

New Zealand	18–30	Australia
Tries: Nigel Vagana; Jerome Ropati; Manu Vatuvei; Goals: Stacey Jones 3/3		Tries: Karmichael Hunt 2 Mark Gasnier; Mark O'Meley; Greg Inglis; Goals: Johnathan Thurston 5/6

Mt Smart Stadium, Auckland
Attendance: 20,000

2006-10-28
20:00 NZST

New Zealand	18–14	Great Britain
Tries: Brent Webb; Motu Tony; Iosia Soliola; Goals: Stacey Jones 3/3		Tries: Paul Wellens; Gareth Ellis; Goals: Sean Long 2/2; Danny McGuire 1/1

Jade Stadium, Christchurch
Attendance: 17,005

This match was discounted after New Zealand were found guilty of fielding an ineligible player.

2006-11-04

New Zealand national rugby league team	34–4	New Zealand Residents

Wingham Park, Greymouth
Attendance: 4000

2006-11-11
20:00 NZST

New Zealand	34–4	Great Britain
Tries: Brent Webb 2 Nigel Vagana; Ruben Wiki; Nathan Cayless; Manu Vatuvei; Goals: Stacey Jones 5/6		Tries: Gareth Ellis

Westpac Stadium, Wellington
Attendance: 16,401

During the Tri-Nations the Kiwis played a New Zealand Residents side in Greymouth and defeated them 34–4. The Residents team included Corey Lawrie, Shane Beyers, David Fisi'iahi, Cliff Beverley, Julian O'Neill, Sala Fa'alogo, Cooper Vuna, George Tuakura and Wayne McDade. Earlier in the year the Residents had hosted a Trans Tasman Quadrangular Series, winning the final against Country 32–18. The Queensland Rangers, New South Wales Country and Jim Beam Cup side all came to New Zealand for the tournament. The Residents side for the tournament included Steve Buckingham, Sala Fa'alogo, Sonny Fai, Fabian Soutar and Miguel Start. The side was coached by David Lomax who was assisted by Sam Panapa.

Auckland hosted the 2006 Pacific Cup, which was won by Tonga. New Zealand Māori finished third. The Māori had already defeated Fiji in a January test match. Later in the season the New Zealand Māori team toured the Cook Islands, losing a three match series 2–1. The New Zealand Māori side was coached by Dean Clark and included Paul Atkins, Jeremiah Pai and Steve Skinnon. Kevin Tamati coached the team in the January match, which included Luke Goodwin.

== National competitions ==
=== Bartercard Cup ===
The 2006 Bartercard Cup was the seventh season of the Bartercard Cup competition run by the New Zealand Rugby League. This season saw substantial change for the Cup as the number of clubs was reduced for the 2006 season from 12 to 10. The New Zealand Rugby League also decided to move towards a franchise model. As a result, there was a large number of clubs affected and all Auckland franchises were reviewed. The major changes were; the Harbour League replaced the Hibiscus Coast Raiders and the North Harbour Tigers, the Waitakere Rangers replaced the Glenora Bears to represent all of Waitakere City, the Auckland Lions replaced the Mt Albert Lions and the Marist Richmond Brothers, the Tamaki Leopards replaced the Otahuhu Ellerslie Leopards and the Eastern Tornadoes and the Northern Storm were formed, to represent Northland. In addition the Wellington Franchise adopted the nickname the Orcas in support of the Southern Orcas National Rugby League bid.

One game a week was shifted to a Monday night and played live on Māori Television.

==== The Teams ====
- Northland, who finished last, were coached by Geoff Morton and ran two training squads each week; one based in Whangarei and one based in Auckland. The Storm's first win was 40–22 against Wellington and was dedicated to co-founder, Anthony Murray who had died earlier that week.
- Harbour were coached by Ken McIntosh and included Shaun Metcalf, Shaun Ata, Jeremiah Pai and Artie Shead.
- Waitakere were coached by Bernie Perenara and included Cliff Beverley, Lee Tamatoa, Gavin Bailey, Matt Rua, Karl Guttenbeil, Scott Jones and Boycie Nelson.
- Auckland were coached by Brian McClennan and included Misi Taulapapa, Malo Solomona, Shannon Stowers, Malo Solomona, Anthony Swann, David Fisiiahi, Miguel Start, Daniel O'Regan, Fabian Soutar, Steve Buckingham, Sala Fa'alogo, Wayne McDade and Julian O'Neill.
- Tamaki were coached by Dean Clark and included Paul Atkins, George Tuakura, Constantine Mika, Leeson Ah Mau and Cooper Vuna.
- Counties Manukau were coached by Gary Kemble and included Kimi Uasi, Sonny Fai, Willie Wolfgramm and Marvin Filipo.
- The Waicoa Bay Stallions included Sam Rapira, Isaac John and Lance Hohaia.
- Central were coached by David Lomax and included Ricky Thorby and Russell Packer. The Falcons played a game in New Plymouth, the first Bartercard Cup match in the region since the Taranaki Wildcats were excluded from the competition at the end of the 2003 season.
- Wellington were coached by Paul Bergman and included Mose Masoe, Ben Matulino, Alehana Mara and Meli Koliavu.
- Canterbury were coached by Phil Prescott and included Shane Beyers, Richard Villasanti, Lusi Sione, Joseph Pombo and Corey Lawrie.

==== Season standings ====
Team	Pld	W	D	L	PF	PA	PD	Pts
Auckland Lions	18	15	1	2	704	270	434	31
Canterbury Bulls	18	13	0	5	583	376	207	26
Waitakere Rangers	18	12	0	6	608	435	173	24
Tamaki Leopards	18	9	2	7	546	440	106	20
Counties Manukau Jetz	18	9	1	8	522	458	64	19
Harbour League	18	9	0	9	476	446	30	18
Wellington Orcas	18	6	0	12	452	549	-97	12
Waicoa Bay Stallions	18	5	2	11	494	662	-168	12
Central Falcons	18	6	0	12	415	678	-263	12
Northern Storm	18	2	2	14	314	802	-488	6

==== The Playoffs ====
The playoff system used was the McIntyre final five system. This meant that:

- Canterbury and Waitakere (being second and third respectively) got a double-chance, as did the Auckland Lions (minor premiers) and the other team that got to play in the Qualification Semi-final (Canterbury).
- The Auckland Lions, being the minor premiers, did't have to play until the Qualification Semi-final.
- Basically, the higher you were on the table, the easier your road to the grand final was.

Qualifying and elimination finals
2	Canterbury Bulls	26
3	Waitakere Rangers	20
4	Tamaki Leopards	25
5	Counties Manukau	12

Semi-finals
1	Auckland Lions	27
Canterbury Bulls	14
Waitakere Rangers	24
Tamaki Leopards	25

Preliminary final
Canterbury Bulls	30
Tamaki Leopards	6

Grand final
Auckland Lions	25
Canterbury Bulls	18

Date	Match	Winner		Loser		Venue
28 August; TV Match	Elimination Play-off	Tamaki Leopards	25	Counties Manukau Jetz	12	Mt Smart Stadium
26 August	Preliminary Semifinal	Canterbury Bulls	26	Waitakere Rangers	20	Rugby League Park
4 September; TV Match	Elimination Semifinal	Tamaki Leopards	25	Waitakere Rangers	24	North Harbour Stadium
3 September	Qualification Semifinal	Auckland Lions	27	Canterbury Bulls	14	Western Springs Stadium
11 September; TV Match	Preliminary Final	Canterbury Bulls	30	Tamaki Leopards	6	Mt Smart Stadium

===== Grand Final =====
Team	Halftime	Total
Auckland Lions	14	25
Canterbury Bulls	12	18

Tries (Auckland)	1: K.Wright, R.Wigg, M.Start
Tries (Canterbury)	1: S.Hurrell, C.Fraser, L.Fanene
Goals (Auckland)	6: S.Buckingham
Goals (Canterbury)	3: S.Hurrell
Field Goals Goals (Auckland)	1: S.Buckingham
Date	18 September
Venue	Mt Smart Stadium
Broadcast	Māori Television

==== National First Division ====
Auckland won the National First Division championship. They were coached by Sam Panapa and defeated Wellington 32–14 in the final at Wise Park. Canterbury and Waikato also competed. The squads were limited to players that had played less than three Bartercard Cup matches that season.

== Australian competitions ==
The New Zealand Warriors competed in the National Rugby League competition. They finished 10th out of 15 teams and failed to make the playoffs.

== Club competitions ==
=== Auckland ===
The Mount Albert Lions won the Fox Memorial trophy, the Rukutai Shield (minor premiership) and the Roope Rooster. The Lions defeated the Papakura Sea Eagles, 49–6, in the final. Mangere East Hawks won the Stormont Shield.

The Manurewa Marlins won the Sharman Cup (Division Two) while Hibiscus Coast won the Phelan Shield (Division Three).

Richie Blackmore coached Otahuhu.

=== Canterbury ===
Hornby won the Canterbury Rugby League title.

=== Other Competitions ===
Turangawaewae defeated the Pikiao Warriors in the Waicoa Bay championship.

The Paikea Whalers defeated EITSA 42-18 to win the Eastern Alliance championship.

Preceded by 2005 Bartercard Cup	Bartercard Cup; 2006	Succeeded by 2007 Bartercard Cup
