= Playoff format =

Format that is used for the elimination round of a sports tournament

There are a number of formats used in various levels of competition in sports and games to determine an overall champion. Some of the most common are the single elimination, the best-of- series, the total points series more commonly known as on aggregate, and the round-robin tournament.

== Single elimination ==
A single-elimination ("knockout") playoff pits the participants in one-game matches, with the loser being dropped from the competition. Single-elimination tournaments are often used in individual sports like tennis. In most tennis tournaments, the players are seeded against each other, and the winner of each match continues to the next round, all the way to the final.

When a playoff of this type involves the top four teams, it is sometimes known as the Shaughnessy playoff system, after Frank Shaughnessy, who first developed it for the International League of minor league baseball. Variations of the Shaughnessy system also exist, such as in the promotion playoffs held by League 1 of the British rugby league. The League 1 playoff does not involve the top four teams; the team that tops the table after the Super 8s phase, which follows a single round-robin phase involving all league teams, is crowned champion and receives automatic promotion to the second-tier championship, while the next four teams contest a knockout playoff for the second promotion place. A nearly identical format, with the only difference being that the knockout stage followed a full home-and-away league season, was used by the second level of France's rugby union system, Pro D2, through the 2016–17 season. Since then, Pro D2 uses a six-team playoff with the winner earning automatic promotion to the Top 14 and the runner-up entering a playoff with the 13th-place team in Top 14 for the final place in the next season's Top 14.

Some knockout tournaments include a third place playoff, a single match to decide which competitor or team will be credited with finishing in third and fourth place. The teams that compete in such third place games are usually the two losing semifinalists in a particular tournament. Although these semifinalists are still in effect "eliminated" from contending for the championship, they may be competing for a bronze medal, like some tournaments in the Olympic Games.

=== In major sports leagues ===
Of the big four North American sports leagues, only the National Football League (NFL) uses a single-elimination system for all rounds of its postseason. (Note: Until the late 1960s, the only annual post-season games in professional American football were the league Championship Games. Divisional playoffs were only held in the event of a tie in the division standings. Divisional playoffs as a regularly-scheduled event were not introduced in the NFL and rival AFL until the seasons immediately preceding the AFL–NFL merger in 1970.) Since the 2020 season, seven teams are seeded from each conference (AFC and NFC), with only the top team from each conference getting a first-round "bye". The remaining six teams in each conference play against each other in the wild-card round. The lowest-seeded winner plays the lone "bye" team, and the other two winners play against each other in the divisional round; the winners of those games facing each other in the conference championships. In all cases, the higher-seeded team plays at home. The winners of the conference championships then face each other in the Super Bowl for the league championship.

Like the NFL, the Canadian Football League (CFL) also uses one-game single-elimination playoffs, and has used them almost exclusively since the 1973 season. In the CFL, six teams qualify for the playoffs, divided into two divisional brackets of three teams each. (Note: Divisional playoffs have been a regular fixture in professional Canadian football since the 1930s. The main rationale for their introduction was that Canadian football clubs were (and, to a considerable extent, still are) more heavily dependent on a steady stream of gate receipts compared to their NFL counterparts, largely due to their playing in relatively small markets and smaller stadiums compared to NFL teams. A more inclusive playoff structure was therefore intended to ensure as many games as possible were "meaningful" through the end of the season, so as to encourage fans to attend games. Prior to 1973, the CFL used two-game and three-game playoffs in its divisional rounds.) The second-place teams in each division host the division semi-final, while the division winners each receive a bye to the division final. The division final winners play in the Grey Cup. The only exception to a strict single-elimination format since the early 1970s was in 1986 (for that season only), when the league amended its playoff format to allow a fourth-place team in one division to qualify in place of a third-place team with a worse record. That year, when only two East Division teams qualified—compared to four West Division teams—the rules mandated the two Eastern teams play a two-game total-points series over two weekends (the two-game total point series was used as the CFL's playoff format prior to 1973), while the four Western teams played a single-elimination playoff over the same timeframe. The CFL eventually amended this format into the present "crossover rule" in 1997 so as to allow a qualifying fourth-place team to compete as the third-place team in the other divisional bracket, thereby preserving the first-place byes.

In both the men's and women's NCAA college basketball tournaments, there are 76 teams seeded into four brackets of 16 teams each. Prior to the first round, eight teams (4 No. 16 seeds and 4 other seeds) play a play-in game to gain entry into the "main" bracket. In the first round, the No. 1 team plays the No. 16, the No. 2 plays the No. 15, and so on. Theoretically, if a higher-ranked team always beats a lower-ranked team, the second game will be arranged No. 1 vs. No. 8, No. 2 vs. No. 7, etc.; the third will be arranged No. 1 vs. No. 4, No. 2 vs. No. 3; the fourth will be arranged No. 1 vs. No. 2. The brackets are fixed, meaning teams are not re-seeded between rounds.

In association football, the World Cup uses single-elimination knockout rounds after a round-robin group stage. The Champions League and Europa League do the same, except each single-elimination round consists of a two-legged tie, with the winner determined by aggregate score. Most European domestic cups (e.g. the FA Cup in England or the DFB-Pokal in Germany) use hybrid systems with various round-robin and single-elimination stages. Major League Soccer (MLS) uses a single-elimination format for their playoffs; since 2023, all rounds are conducted as single games, except the conference quarterfinals, which is best-of-three series. Liga MX in Mexico, which splits its season into two phases, uses playoffs known as the Liguilla to determine the champions of each phase. Unlike the MLS system, all Liguilla matches are two-legged ties. Australia's A-League introduced a six-team knockout playoff, known locally as a "finals series", in the 2012–13 season. Unlike the MLS playoffs or Liga MX Liguilla, the A-League finals series uses one-off matches throughout, culminating in the A-League Grand Final. This format is a departure from norms in football codes in Australia; previously, the A-League used a hybrid elimination system that allowed top teams in the regular season to lose one finals match but still win the tournament. The Philippines Football League's inaugural 2017 season also featured a playoff finals known as the final series.

The Pro Kabaddi League and Indian Super League also uses a type of single elimination where the top two teams get byes into the semifinals while the other four teams play in two eliminators like this:

- Eliminator 1: Rank 3 vs Rank 6
- Eliminator 2: Rank 4 vs Rank 5
- Semifinal 1: Rank 2 vs Winner of Eliminator 1
- Semifinal 2: Rank 1 vs Winner of Eliminator 2
- Final: Winner of Semifinal 1 vs Winner of Semifinal 2

Although the Indian Super League follows the UEFA Champions League style of two legs in their semi finals.

=== Example ===
The UEFA Euro 1996 knockout stage:

Quarter-finals
22 June – Liverpool
France (p)	0 (5)
Netherlands	0 (4)
23 June – Birmingham
Czech Republic	1
Portugal	0
23 June – Manchester
Germany	2
Croatia	1
22 June – London
Spain	0 (2)
England (p)	0 (4)

Semi-finals
26 June – Manchester
France	0 (5)
Czech Republic (p)	0 (6)
26 June – London
Germany (p)	1 (6)
England	1 (5)

Final
30 June – London
Czech Republic	1
Germany (g.g.)	2

== Stepladder ==
The "stepladder", named because the bracket resembles a step ladder, is a variation of the single-elimination tournament; instead of the No. 1 seed facing the No. 16 seed in the first round, the bracket is constructed to give the higher seeded teams byes, where the No. 1 seed has bye up to the third (or fourth) round, playing the winner of game between the No. 8 seed and the No. 9-versus-No. 16 winner. This setup is seldom used in a best-of-x series, as it may yield long waits for the teams winning the bye, while the teams that played in the earlier rounds would be spent when they reach the later rounds.

=== In sports leagues ===
The Big East men's basketball tournament used this format in a 16-team, five-round format. The PBA Tour uses a four-player, three-round format (sometimes a five-player, four-round format). College leagues in the Philippines use this format (four teams, three rounds) only if there is an undefeated team, and if there are seven teams or more participating. Otherwise for tournaments of seven or more teams where no team won all games, it uses a single-elimination two-round, four teams format.

While Nippon Professional Baseball's Climax Series has been called a "stepladder" playoff with only three participating teams (in two rounds), it functions mostly as a single-elimination tournament with three teams, and is structurally the same as a six-team, three-round playoff. The KBO League's Korean Series, on the other hand, is considered a stepladder system: the teams that finish fourth and fifth place play a best-of-three series (the fourth-place team automatically given a 1–0 series lead), meaning that the fourth-place team need to win only one game to advance while the fifth place have to win two. The winner of that round faces the team that finished in third place. The winner then plays the second-place team in a best-of-five series, whose winner in turn plays the first-place team in a best-of-seven series for the title.

The WNBA, from 2019 to 2021, used to have their playoffs done this way: the No. 5 seed plays No. 8, and No. 6 plays No. 7 in the first round. The top two seeds got double byes, and the next two seeds first-round byes. The first two rounds are single-elimination; all others are best-of-five.

The video game League of Legends has a competition that often uses the stepladder system. The League of Legends Pro League (LPL) uses a double stepladder for its playoffs, giving the top two teams a bye to the semifinals, the third and fourth-place teams a bye to the quarterfinals, and the fifth and sixth-placed teams a bye to the second round. The League of Legends Champions Korea (LCK) also used a stepladder bracket for the playoffs, while the League of Legends Championship Series (LCS) and League of Legends Master Series (LMS) used it to determine the LCS and LMS third representatives at the League of Legends World Championship, which in this case was referred to as "The Gauntlet". The LCS scrapped the Gauntlet in 2020, while the LMS became the Pacific Championship Series (PCS) that year following a merger with Southeast Asia's scene. The LCK moved towards a more traditional playoff system in 2021.

The video game Rocket League has had competitions that has used the stepladder system. The Rocket League Championship Series (RLCS) Winter Split in the 2022–23 season used a Round Robin group stage where places 2 and 3 would go to round 1 of the playoffs, while first place would receive a bye to the quarterfinals. The RLCS Season 8 World Championship also used a stepladder bracket. There were 2 double elimination groups of 6, which also used the stepladder format with the top 4 teams given a bye to the upper semifinals, whereas the bottom 8 teams started in the upper quarterfinals. This season's playoffs was also a stepladder bracket, with the top 2 seeds from the group stage progressing to the semifinals, and the No. 3 to No. 6 seeds playing in the quarterfinals. For the 2026 season, the RLCS Kick-Off Weekend used a double stepladder for the tournament, with No. 5 to No. 8 seeds playing in the first round, No. 3 to No. 4 playing in the quarterfinals, and the top 2 seeds progressing directly to the semifinals, in the bracket named the Gauntlet Bracket.

=== Example ===
See 2023 West Coast Conference men's basketball tournament

First round Thursday, March 2
8	Portland	92
9	San Diego	74
7	Pacific	84
10	Pepperdine	71

Second round Friday, March 3
5	BYU	82
8	Portland	71
6	San Francisco	80
7	Pacific	63

Third round Saturday, March 4
4	Loyola Marymount	63
5	BYU	73
3	Santa Clara	87
6	San Francisco	93*

Semifinals; Monday, March 6
1	Saint Mary’s	76
5	BYU	69
2	Gonzaga	84
6	San Francisco	73

Championship; Tuesday, March 7
1	Saint Mary's	51
2	Gonzaga	77

* denotes overtime period

== Double elimination ==
A double-elimination format is one in which a participant ceases to be eligible to win the tournament's championship upon having lost two matches. The exact schedule shape will change depending on the number of teams per bracket.

=== In sports leagues ===
In the United States, a double-elimination format is used in most NCAA and high school baseball and softball tournaments. Starting in 2010, the Little League World Series in baseball also adopted this format. Teams are eliminated from contention after incurring two losses in each round of play. Most major collegiate baseball conferences with a double-elimination format send only the top eight teams, or a mix of top teams plus the winners of a single-elimination qualifier tournament, to their conference tournament. The NCAA baseball and softball tournaments have used the format since its inception for regional and College World Series play. (Note: In the current NCAA tournament format for four teams, the No. 1 seed plays the No. 4 seed ("Game 1"), and the No. 2 seed plays the No. 3 seed ("Game 2") on the first day of regional tournaments, and the first and second days of the College World Series (where the second bracket games are known as "Game 3" and "Game 4", respectively). On the second day or series (third and fourth days at the College World Series), the losers play in the morning to determine who is eliminated ("Game 3" in regional, "Games 5" and "Game 7" in College World Series play), and who advances to the third game of the day. The winners ("Game 4" in regional, "Game 6" and "Game 8" in College World Series) play to determine who advances to the final on the third day. In NCAA regional games, the loser of this game plays the winner of the morning game that evening ("Game 5") to determine who plays in the final. In College World Series play, because the bracket teams play on alternating days, these games ("Game 9" and "Game 10") are played on the fifth day. In NCAA regional games, the third day will feature the regional championship ("Game 6"). If the winner of Game 4 defeats the winner of Game 5, the winner advances to the Super Regional. Until the 2005 tournament, if the winner of Game 5 defeats the winner of Game 4, the two teams would meet again in game 7 thirty minutes later to determine which team advances to the Super Regional. However, with a concern that some teams were playing four games in two days, the NCAA made a rule change in 2005 to equalize the disadvantage of the winner of Game 5 by stating should the winner of Game 5 win game 6, Game 7 would be played on a fourth day. In the College World Series, on the sixth day, the winner of Game 9 plays the winner of Game 7 ("Game 11"), and the winner of Game 10 plays the winner of Game 8 ("Game 12"). If the winner in game 7 wins Game 11 or the winner of Game 8 wins Game 12, such winners advance to the best-of-three final. If the winner of Game 9 defeats the winner of Game 7 or the winner of Game 10 defeats the winner of Game 8 the two teams would play again on the seventh day in Games 13 and 14, respectively, if they are needed, to determine who advances to the final.)

The Little League World Series adopted a new format in 2010 that involves four double-elimination brackets. In 2010, the U.S. division and the International division were split into two four-team pools, with each pool conducting a double-elimination tournament to determine its winner. After the end of double-elimination play, the U.S. pool winners play one another in single games, as do the International pool winners, with the losers playing a third-place game and the winners playing a final. This was altered in 2011 so that all eight U.S. teams and all eight international teams played in one large bracket each, with each bracket's winner playing each other for the championship, and each bracket's runner-up playing each other for third-place. All teams are guaranteed at least three games; the first team eliminated from each pool plays a "crossover game" that matches an eliminated U.S. team with an eliminated International team.

Many esports, such as Counter-Strike and StarCraft, use a double-elimination bracket in competitions to determine the top two teams in a four-team group. In this usage, the format is referred to as "GSL", after the Global StarCraft II League. Dota 2 competitions often use a GSL or round-robin group stage to seed teams into a double-elimination bracket. Super Smash Bros. tournaments, as well as other fighting game competitions, typically use an open double-elimination bracket with no preceding group stage or qualifiers. Rocket League also uses 8 team GSL groups to seed teams into an AFL style bracket, and also has used standard double elimination brackets.

=== Example ===
The Mideast regional of the 1975 NCAA Division I baseball tournament:

Semifinals
Michigan	5
Penn St.	2
Eastern Michigan	5
Clemson	3
Lower round 1
Penn St.	5
Clemson	4

Final
Eastern Michigan	3
Michigan	2
Lower final
Michigan	10
Penn St.	7

Grand Final + Bracket Reset (If Necessary)
Michigan	4	1
Eastern Michigan	2	2

== McIntyre Systems ==
Some playoff systems combine the features of single- and double-elimination tournaments. In these systems, one or more higher-ranked teams have an opportunity to skip a round of the playoffs by winning their first match. Even if they lose that match, they can still advance to the championship final. Lower-ranked teams receive no such break.

These are variations of systems developed by Australian lawyer Ken McIntyre for the Victorian Football League (VFL), the historic predecessor to today's Australian Football League (AFL), starting in 1931.

=== Page–McIntyre system ===
This system, also bearing the name of its promoter Percy Page, is a four-team playoff first developed for Australian rules football. It has been used in many competitions in that sport and in rugby league, but is most prominent in softball and curling (which use the name "Page playoff system"). The Indian Premier League, Pakistan Super League in Twenty20 cricket, and NBA play-in tournament use this format as well.

In this system, the first round (sometimes called the "quarterfinals") matches No. 1 against No. 2 and No. 3 against No. 4. The winner of the 1–2 match advances directly to the final. The next round, known as the semifinal, pits the loser of the 1–2 match against the winner of the 3–4 match.

==== Example ====
The 2006 Tim Hortons Brier, Canada's national men's curling championship:

Page Playoffs
1	Ontario	9
2	Quebec	6
3	Alberta	5
4	Nova Scotia	6

Semifinal
2	Quebec	7
4	Nova Scotia	6

Final
1	Ontario	7
2	Quebec	8

=== Top-five system ===
McIntyre's first modification was an expansion to five teams. In this format, the first-round matches No. 2 v No. 3 and No. 4 v No. 5, with the No. 1 seed receiving a bye into the second round. The 4–5 match is played to eliminate one team, while the 2–3 match is played to determine which match they will play in the second round.

In the second round, the loser of the 2–3 match plays the winner of the 4–5 match, while the winner of the 2–3 match plays the No. 1 seed. From this point forward, the tournament is identical to the Page playoff system.

The SANFL is the highest level league using this system today, it has been used in the past by the VFL and several rugby league competitions, most notably the short-lived Super League of Australia and the present-day Super League in the UK and France. Many lower-level leagues in both Australian rules and rugby league still use the system.

A variation of the five-team playoff system has been used by the Big Bash League since its 2019-20 seaeson. In the first round, the fourth- and fifth-ranked teams play each other and the winner goes to the next round as fourth while the loser is eliminated. Then, four-way playoffs will start (1 vs 2 and 3 vs winner 4–5 match.)

==== Example ====
As used in the 2006 Bartercard Cup, the championship of New Zealand rugby league:

Qualifying and elimination finals
2	Canterbury Bulls	26
3	Waitakere Rangers	20
4	Tamaki Leopards	25
5	Counties Manukau Jetz	12

Semi-finals
1	Auckland Lions	27
Canterbury Bulls	14
Waitakere Rangers	24
Tamaki Leopards	25

Preliminary final
Canterbury Bulls	30
Tamaki Leopards	6

Grand final
Auckland Lions	25
Canterbury Bulls	18

=== Top six system ===
McIntyre next developed two slightly different systems for six-team playoffs. In each system, the No. 1 and No. 2 seeds played to determine the specific semifinal match in which they would compete, while the other four teams played knockout matches in the first week to eliminate two teams and determine the other two semifinal participants. The semifinal in which the winner of the 1–2 match competes directly determines one place in the championship final (often called a "Grand Final", especially in Australia). The other semifinal is an elimination match, with the winner advancing into a "Preliminary Final" to determine the other Grand Final place. There is also one more system. Two teams are in lower-bracket round 1, two teams are in the upper-bracket quarter-finals and two teams are in the semi-finals. The winner of the upper and lower quarter-finals join the two semi-finalists in a single-elimination bracket.

This system was further refined into the top-six system used by the Championship and League 1 of European rugby league until being abandoned from the 2015 season forward. A slightly modified version of this system was used in the A-League of Australian soccer starting in 2010 before a pure knockout format was adopted beginning in 2013.

In the modern top-six system, the first round consists of knockout matches involving No. 3 vs No. 6 and No. 4 vs No. 5, with the No. 1 and No. 2 teams receiving a bye into the next round. After those matches, the format is identical to the Page playoff system.

The A-League's former system had the top two teams participating in a two-legged match instead of the single-elimination matches that the other four teams faced. It did not affect the teams' eventual playoff paths.

==== Example ====
As used in the 2010–11 A-League:

Elimination finals
3	Adelaide United	1
6	Wellington Phoenix	0
4	Gold Coast United	1
5	Melbourne Victory	0

Semifinals
1	Brisbane Roar (agg.)	2	2
2	Central Coast Mariners	0	2
Adelaide United	2
Gold Coast United	3

Preliminary final
Central Coast Mariners	1
Gold Coast United	0

Grand final
Brisbane Roar (pen.)	2 (4)
Central Coast Mariners	2 (2)

=== Top eight system ===
McIntyre's final development expanded the concept to an eight-team playoff. This expansion meant that no team received a "second chance" after the first week of the playoffs.

==== McIntyre final eight ====
The original McIntyre final eight system is notable in that it uses the regular-season league table to eliminate two teams in the first week of the playoffs. The procedure is:

Week 1

- 1st qualifying final: 4th seed vs 5th seed
- 2nd qualifying final: 3rd seed vs 6th seed
- 3rd qualifying final: 2nd seed vs 7th seed
- 4th qualifying final: 1st seed vs 8th seed

The fates of the teams in this round depend on whether they won or lost their Qualifying Final, and on their regular-season position. The four winners and the two losers that finished highest on the regular-season table advance to later rounds, with the two other losers eliminated. It guarantees the top two seeds advancement, and requires the bottom two seeds to win their qualifying final. The middle four teams' fate is determined by the performance of the other four teams.

Week 2

- 1st semi-final: 4th-highest-ranked winner vs 2nd-highest-ranked loser
- 2nd semi-final: 3rd-highest-ranked winner vs highest-ranked loser

The two losing teams are eliminated, and the two winning teams progress to week 3.

Week 3

- 1st Preliminary Final: Highest-seeded Qualifying Final winner vs winner of 1st semi-final
- 2nd Preliminary Final: Second-highest-seeded Qualifying Final winner vs winner of 2nd semi-final

The two losing teams are eliminated, and the two winning teams progress to the grand final.

Week 4

- Grand Final: winner of 1st Preliminary Final vs winner of 2nd Preliminary Final

Due to perceived weaknesses of this system, the AFL adopted a modified top-eight playoff in 2000. The National Rugby League (NRL), Australia's top rugby league competition (also with a team in New Zealand), used this system from 1999 through 2011, after which it changed to the AFL system.

==== AFL system ====
The current AFL finals system breaks up the eight participants into four groups of two teams, ranked by their league position after regular-season play. Each group receives an advantage over the teams directly below it on the league table. These advantages are the so-called "double-chance", where a loss in the first week will not eliminate a team from the finals, and home ground finals. Note, however, that "home" designations are often irrelevant if a finals match involves two teams from the same state. The finals format operates as follows:

Week 1

- 1st qualifying final: 1st seed hosts 4th seed
- 2nd qualifying final: 2nd seed hosts 3rd seed
- 1st elimination final: 5th seed hosts 8th seed
- 2nd elimination final: 6th seed hosts 7th seed

The top four teams play the two qualifying finals. The winners get a bye through to week 3 of the tournament to play home preliminary finals, while the losers play home semi-finals in week 2. The bottom four teams play the two elimination finals, where the winners advance to week 2 away games and the losers' seasons are over.

Week 2

- 1st semi-final: Loser of 1st QF hosts winner of 1st EF
- 2nd semi-final: Loser of 2nd QF hosts winner of 2nd EF

Week 3

- 1st preliminary final: Winner of 1st QF hosts winner of 2nd SF
- 2nd preliminary final: Winner of 2nd QF hosts winner of 1st SF

Week 4

- AFL Grand Final: Winners of the two Preliminary Finals meet at the MCG.

The specific advantages gained by finishing in higher positions on the league table are as follows:

First and second – These teams receive the double-chance, and play their first two finals matches at home—their Qualifying Final, and then either a Semi-final (should they lose the QF) or Preliminary Final (should they win the QF). They must win two finals matches to reach the grand final.

Third and fourth – Like the top two teams, they receive the double-chance, and must win two finals matches to reach the grand final. However, they only get to play one finals match at home—a Semi-final if they lose their QF, or Preliminary Final if they win the QF.

Fifth and sixth – These teams do not receive a double-chance. They must win three matches to reach the grand final—an elimination final, semi-final and preliminary final. They do get to host their EF.

Seventh and eighth – These teams receive neither a double-chance nor a home finals match, and must also win three finals matches to reach the grand final.

The National Rugby League and Victorian Football League operate the same finals system.

This format has also been used by the Rocket League Championship Series throughout the 2024 - 2027 Club Championship seasons.

==== Super League system ====
From 2009 through to 2014, the Super League used a top-eight playoff system. The expansion to an eight-team bracket coincided with the league's expansion from 12 to 14 teams. Like the AFL system, the Super League system eliminated two teams in each week leading up to the grand final. However, it had a number of differences from the AFL system, most notably the feature known as "Club Call" (explained below).

As in the AFL, the participants were ranked by league position in the regular season. Unlike in the AFL, the team receiving home advantage in each match leading up to the grand final was guaranteed the right to host the match at a ground of its choosing, either its regular home stadium or (rarely) a larger nearby alternative.

Week 1

- Qualifying play-offs:
  - 1st vs 4th
  - 2nd vs 3rd

The winners of these matches advanced directly to week 3, in which they received home advantage. The higher-seeded winner received Club Call immediately after week 2. The losers had another chance in week 2, when they were at home to the winners of the week 1 elimination play-offs.

- Elimination Play-offs
  - 5th v 8th
  - 6th v 7th

The winners of these matches advanced to week 2, with the losers being eliminated.

Week 2

- Preliminary Semi-Final 1: Highest-seeded QPO loser (1, 2, or 3) vs lowest-seeded EPO winner (6, 7, or 8)
- Preliminary Semi-Final 2: Lowest-seeded QPO loser (2, 3, or 4) vs highest-seeded EPO winner (5, 6, or 7)

The winners of these matches advanced to week 3 and Club Call, with the losers being eliminated.

Club Call

Club Call, a unique feature of the Super League system, took place on the second weekend of the playoffs, shortly after the winners of the two PSFs were known. The highest-seeded winning club from week 1 was required to choose which of the two PSF winners they would play in week 3.

Week 3

- Qualifying Semi-Final 1: Highest-seeded QPO Winner v Club Call selected PSF winner
- Qualifying Semi-Final 2: Second-seeded QPO Winner v Club Call non-selected PSF winner

The winners advanced to the grand final the following week.

Week 4

- Super League Grand Final at Old Trafford, Manchester

Super League XX in 2015 introduced a radical change to the league system, under which the 24 clubs in Super League and the second-tier Championship are split into three groups of eight after each club has played 22 matches. The top eight clubs in Super League at that point will enter a new play-off structure, beginning with a single round-robin mini-league followed by a Shaughnessy play-off involving the top four teams. Another six team playoffs goes like this:

== Best-of formats ==
The "best-of" formats refer to a head-to-head competition where the two competitors compete to first win the majority of the games allotted to win the "series". Because of this, in some sports and games, if n is the number of games in these formats, oftentimes an odd number, the "best-of-n" formats are also called "first-to-(n+1)/2". If a competitor wins a majority of the games, the remaining games are not played (unless the maximum number of games in the series are played). This is a modification of the single-elimination tournament to allow more matches to be held. Moreover, if it can be said that if one competitor has a higher probability of winning a single game (and game results are i.i.d.), the likelihood that this competitor wins the series increases when more games are played. For example, if team A has a 70% chance of defeating team B in a single game, its probability of winning a best-of-three series against B is 78.4%, and its probability of winning a best-of-seven series is about 87.4%.

=== One win advantage ===
In a modification of the best-of-three, -five, -seven, or -nine-and-more game format, leagues may award a one win advantage where the higher seed has the advantage, where the team with this advantage needs to win one less game than their opponent to advance. In essence, one team is given a de facto 1–0 lead in a playoff series. This format is prominently used in the Philippines, where it is commonly known as the "twice-to-beat advantage", with the other team having the "twice-to-win disadvantage".

It was first applied in the finals of the scholastic UAAP basketball and volleyball championships in 1979, where the team has a 1–0 lead in the best-of-3 series. It has been applied to the UAAP's semifinals since 1994, and was later adopted by their NCAA counterparts in 1997, and other associations in their mandatory scholastic competitions. The professional Philippine Basketball Association, its semi-professional D-League, volleyball's Premier Volleyball League and the inactive Philippine Super Liga have adopted the format for the quarterfinal rounds of their conference playoffs.

An amendment to the UAAP rules in 2008 gave the undefeated team (the team that won all preliminary round games) a bye up to the finals, possessing an automatic 1–0 lead in a best-of-five series, or a "thrice (three times)-to-beat advantage". The "twice-to-beat advantage" was adopted by the Philippine NCAA in 2009 for the undefeated team that had a finals berth, but would be abolished by both leagues in 2016, wherein the finals was played in a regular best-of-three format.

A similar situation also existed in later versions of the Argus finals system used commonly in Australian rules football competitions in the early part of the 20th century: later versions of the system had a right of challenge for the minor premier (the team on top of the ladder) if they lost the Semi-Final or the Final, meaning that the minor premier had to be beaten twice for another team to win the premiership. In the event that the same team played the minor premier in the Semi-Final or the Final and in the Grand Final, the right of challenge became equivalent to the minor premier holding a 1–0 lead in a best-of-three series.

In the KBO League in South Korean baseball, the No. 4 team in the Wild Card game, or the first round of its postseason, has 1–0 lead in the best-of-three series, and can advance with a single win or tie, while the No. 5 team has to win twice in order to advance.

In Nippon Professional Baseball, the Climax Series second stage, where the top team in the regular season faces the winner of the playoff between the second and third place teams, uses a one-win advantage for a six-game playoff (which is a best-of-seven). In this case, the top seed needs only to win three games, while the lower seed must win four games to advance to the Japan Series.

As discussed below, the Turkish Basketball League gives a team a 1–0 lead in a best-of-7 series if it defeated its opponent twice during the regular season.

Described as a "best-of-two" series in the resumption of the 2019–20 NBA season, if the ninth-ranked team is within four games behind the eighth-ranked team after the seeding games are done, play-in games will be held between the two teams. Here, the eighth-ranked team has to win just once while the ninth-ranked team has to beat the eighth-ranked team twice in a row to qualify to the playoffs proper. The Memphis Grizzlies finishing ninth, half-a-game behind the Portland Trail Blazers, necessitated the play-in game. The Blazers eliminated the Grizzlies in game one to advance to the playoffs.

==== Examples ====
- One-win advantage in a best-of-3 series (2024 KBO League wild card game)
  - Game 1: (5) KT Wiz 4, (4) Doosan Bears 0
  - Game 2: (5) KT Wiz 1, (4) Doosan Bears 0
    - (5) KT Wiz won series in 2 games
- One-win advantage in a best-of-5 series (UAAP Season 76 volleyball women's tournament finals)
  - Game 1: (1) La Salle 1, (3) Ateneo 3
  - Game 2: (1) La Salle 3, (3) Ateneo 1
  - Game 3: (1) La Salle 2, (3) Ateneo 3
  - Game 4: (1) La Salle 0, (3) Ateneo 3
    - (3) Ateneo won series in 4 games
- One-win advantage in a best-of-7 series (2018 Pacific League Climax Series final stage)
  - Game 1: (2) Fukuoka SoftBank Hawks 10, (1) Saitama Seibu Lions 4
  - Game 2: (2) Fukuoka SoftBank Hawks 5, (1) Saitama Seibu Lions 13
  - Game 3: (2) Fukuoka SoftBank Hawks 15, (1) Saitama Seibu Lions 4
  - Game 4: (2) Fukuoka SoftBank Hawks 8, (1) Saitama Seibu Lions 2
  - Game 5: (2) Fukuoka SoftBank Hawks 6, (1) Saitama Seibu Lions 5
    - (2) Fukuoka SoftBank Hawks won series in 5 games

=== Best-of-three playoff ===
A best-of-three playoff (also known as a first-to-two playoff) is a head-to-head competition between two teams in which one team must win two games to win the series. Two is chosen as it constituted a majority of the games played; if one team sweeps both of the first two games, game 3 is ignored.

When a best-of series is tied (each team having won the same number of games), the bracket is sometimes said to be a "best-of-(number of games left)." This is because for all practical purposes, the teams are starting over. For instance, if a best-of-seven series is deadlocked at 2–2, the series can be referred to as a "best-of-three", since the first team to win the next two games advances. Game 7 would only be played if two teams split Games 5 and 6.

In tennis, matches are usually decided with a best-of-three-sets format. Some major tournaments are played in a best-of-five-sets format, most notably the Grand Slam men's singles and doubles. Also, the 35-and-over Gentlemen's Invitation Doubles and the 35-and-over Ladies' Invitation Doubles at Wimbledon are both round-robin tournaments.

==== In North American competitions ====
The first use of the best-of-three playoff was in Major League Baseball. The National League authorized a playoff to be held if two teams ended the season in a tie for first place; the American League used a single game in this situation. From 1969 to 2021, both leagues have used only a one-game playoff as a tie-breaker if only one team can advance; since 2022, a criterion based on regular-season performance is used. Since 1995, a tie-breaker based on regular-season performance can be used only to seed teams.

Since 2022, the Wild Card Series sees the 3rd seed hosts the 6th seed and the fourth playing the 5th, and the two higher seeds play at home for all three games, the third if needed.

Both the National Basketball Association (NBA) and National Hockey League (NHL) once used best-of-three playoffs (often referred to as a "mini-series"), but today neither league does. Professional basketball first adopted the best-of-three playoff for first-round play starting with its inception as the Basketball Association of America in 1946, before changing its name to the NBA three years later. Basketball retained the format through the 1959–60 season; the league resumed its use of the best-of-three first-round series in 1974–75, but abolished it again in 1983–84 when the number of teams qualifying for its postseason tournament was increased to 16 (10 teams had qualified during the first two years of the aforementioned period, this number being expanded to 12 in 1976–77; in both instances some of the highest-ranking teams did not participate in the best-of-three round, drawing byes and automatically advancing to the second round, which was best-of-seven, as were all subsequent rounds).

In ice hockey, the best-of-three format was one of two possible types of series that could be held to determine the winner of the Stanley Cup (the other being a two-legged playoff series). It was used in lower rounds in the NHL up until the Original Six era. The best-of-three series in the modern era was first used in the first round of the Stanley Cup playoffs beginning with the 1974–75 season. At that time, the number of NHL playoff teams had been increased to twelve from the previous eight. The format which then took effect called for the first three finishers in each of the league's four divisions to enter the postseason, but the four division winners earn first-round byes and advanced to the best-of-seven quarterfinals, and so did not play any best-of-three series. The postseason then proceeded as the NBA's did, with the second round onwards being best-of-seven. This remained the case until the 1979–80 season, when the NHL expanded its playoff field to sixteen after absorbing four teams from the defunct World Hockey Association in a semi-merger, whereupon the byes were abolished and all 16 qualifying teams participated in the first round, which was lengthened to best-of-five. In both the NBA and NHL, the team ranked higher in the standings during the regular season played the first and (if necessary) the third games of the series at home, with the lower-ranked team hosting the second game.

The World Cup of Hockey, organized by the NHL, used a best-of-three format in the final round in 1996 and 2016, as did the Canada Cup.

Until 2009, the WNBA forced the team with the higher record to travel to the lower seed's home court for game 1, then played the final game(s) at home. Because of this perceived inequity, in 2010, the league switched to a more traditional odd-even format, where the higher seed will play the first and (if needed) third games at home. Starting in 2022, this is used in the league quarterfinals. From 2005 to 2024, the league changed the WNBA Finals to a best-of-five format. By 2016, the league semifinals matched this format.

NCAA Division I baseball uses the best-of-three format in the second round and the final round of its 64-team championship tournament. Starting in 1999, when the tournament expanded from 48 teams (eight regionals of six teams each) to 64 teams (sixteen regionals of four teams each), the NCAA introduced the "super regional", in which the 16 regional winners play in eight best-of-three series, with the eight series winners advancing to the Men's College World Series (MCWS). If a regional winner is also a national seed (one of the top eight seeds of the 64 first-round teams), it is guaranteed to host the super regional. If no national seed makes a particular super regional, the NCAA puts hosting rights up for bidding between the competing schools. In 2003, the MCWS changed from a one-game final to a best-of-three series.

Major League Soccer has the conference quarterfinals in a best-of-three round, with the higher seed playing the odd games, game three if needed.

USA Wrestling's annual Final X event has individuals competing in a best-of-three series of matches, with the winners qualifying for Team USA at that year's World Wrestling Championships or Olympic Games.

From approximately the founding of the Western Interprovincial Football Union in 1936 until the early 1970s, multi-game playoffs series were a regular fixture of professional Canadian football playoffs. Over the years, both the WIFU (later the Western Football Conference) and the Interprovincial Rugby Football Union (later the Eastern Football Conference) used a combination of best-of-three series, three-game total points series, and two-game total points series to determine both conference final participants and conference champions. The Grey Cup championship itself has always consisted of a single game. The last best-of-three playoff series (in what by then had evolved into the present-day Canadian Football League in 1958) consisting of two autonomous conferences was the 1971 Western Conference Final. Since 1972, the West has used one-game playoffs. The Eastern Conference (which by that time had abolished the best-of-three format in favor of two-game total points series) adopted one-game playoffs for the 1973 season.

==== Competitions held outside North America ====
The Euroleague, the primary Europe-wide club competition in basketball, introduced a quarterfinal round for the 2004–05 season which originally employed a best-of-three format. Starting with the 2008–09 season, the quarterfinal round became best-of-five. This is the only point in the Euroleague where a playoff series is used; all earlier rounds are conducted in a league format, and the quarterfinal winners advance to the final Four, where all games are one-off knockout matches.

In the FIBA Oceania Championship, the best-of-three series is used if only both Australia and New Zealand play in the tournament. If a team wins the first two games, the last game may still be played. If other teams participate, a regular round-robin or multi-stage tournament is used. In 2009, a two-legged tie was used, but it was reverted to a best-of-three series in 2011.

The best-of-three playoff system was also used in the Campeonato Brasileiro Série A for the 1998 and 1999 quarterfinals, semifinals and finals. The Brazilian model was unique in that extra time was not used (meaning matches could end in a draw). If neither team won two games, the team with the most victories would qualify (for instance, if one team won the first match before drawing the next two). If both teams had one victory, the team with the best goal difference would qualify. If the goal difference was the same, the team with the best regular-season campaign would qualify.

The Philippine Premier Volleyball League, uniquely, uses a best-of-three series to determine the third-place team at the end of its conferences' playoffs rather than one game, as did its predecessor Shakey's V-League.

=== Best-of-five playoff ===
A best-of-five playoff (also known as a first-to-three playoff) is a head-to-head competition between two teams, wherein one must win three games to win the series. Three is chosen as it constituted a majority of games played. If one team wins the series before reaching game 5, all others are ignored.

At present, only one of the major professional sports leagues in the United States and Canada—Major League Baseball—uses the best-of-five playoff, doing so in its second round, known as the Division Series. At one time, however, the League Championship Series (semifinals) was best-of-five, from its birth with both leagues' realignment into two divisions in 1969, continuing until the round was lengthened to best-of-seven in 1985. (This change would have immediate ramifications: In the American League, in each of the first two years where the LCS used the best-of-seven format, the Kansas City Royals in 1985 and the Boston Red Sox in 1986 fell behind 3–1, which previously would have eliminated them, before coming back to win the series.) When the wild card was first used in 1995 (it was created for the 1994 season, but that year's entire postseason was cancelled due to a players' strike), the best-of-five format was authorized for the new Division Series, in which eight teams participated.

During the time that the League Championship Series was best-of-five, a "2–3" format was used, with one team hosting the first two games, hence "2", the other the last three, hence "3" (the respective roles alternating between the Eastern and Western Division champions, regardless of which one finished with the better regular-season record). This procedure was repeated when the best-of-five Division Series was added in 1995 (except that two of each league's now three division winners hosted three games, and the wild card never do so). However, starting in 1998, the home-field advantage was awarded to the two division winners in each league that had the best regular-season records, and the "2–2–1" format was instituted: the team with the home-field advantage was given games 1, 2 and 5 at home, not games 3–5 (team with home-field advantage hosting the first two games, then the other team the next two, then the team with the home-field advantage hosting 1 last game). Also, that format gives both teams the home-field advantage in a sense. While one team gets to host three games (including the critical first and last game), the other team does get two chances out of three (games 3 and 4) of winning the series at home. For the 2012 postseason only, the Division Series reverted to "2–3". (This decision was made after the 2012 schedule had been released; due to the addition of a second Wild Card team and the subsequent extra Wild Card Game, that format was used to minimize the disruption of the schedule by giving the Division Series one off-day instead of two). Starting in 2013, the "2–2–1" format was restored with the Wild Card playoff round now established and schedules adjusted accordingly.

The National Basketball Association (NBA) and National Hockey League (NHL) both formerly used best-of-five series. The NBA did so in its second-round playoff prior to the 1957–58 season, and in the first round from 1960–61 through 1966–67, and again from 1983–84 until 2002–03, when it was lengthened to a best-of-seven series. The NHL did so for its first-round series beginning with the 1979–80 season and lasting until increasing its first round to best-of-seven in 1986–87. The best-of-5 format was reinstated for the 2020 Stanley Cup qualifying round between seeds 5–12. Unlike in baseball, in both NBA and NHL, in a best-of-five series the higher regular-season finisher always hosts the first, second and (if necessary) fifth games. The AHL has used the best-of-five series in the first round since the 2012 postseason.

From 2005 to 2024, the Women's National Basketball Association (WNBA) used a best-of-five format for its championship series; since 2025, best-of-seven. The league semifinals matched this format starting in 2016.

In its inaugural 2023-24 season the Professional Women's Hockey League used the best-of-five format for the Walter Cup playoffs, the semifinals & the world championship. Come 2027, there'll be a third round like this, starting with the conference semifinals.

Historically, most European domestic basketball leagues have used a best-of-five format in their championship series. The main long-standing exceptions are the Israeli and French leagues, which have historically used one-off finals, the Adriatic League (former Yugoslavia), which has changed from a one-off final to a best-of-three final back to a one-off final in recent years, and the Lithuanian, Polish and Turkish leagues, which use a best-of-seven format. Italy has gone to a best-of-seven final effective with its 2008–09 season. The Euroleague quarterfinal round expanded to best-of-five from best-of-three starting in the 2008–09 season. France changed its final from a one-off match to a best-of-five series in 2012–13.

The Ashes, a cricket series played between Australia and England is a five-match series. If the series is tied, the team holding the trophy keeps until the next series. Most test cricket matches are played under this format, but others extend up to seven matches. Test cricket is typically hosted by one team throughout the entire series. While series such as this have five matches, it is not exactly "best-of-five", as draws and other results, are possible.

=== Best-of-seven playoff ===
A best-of-seven playoff (also known as a first-to-four playoff) is a head-to-head competition between two teams, wherein one must win four games to win the series. Four is chosen as it constitutes winning a majority of the seven games played. If one team wins the series before reaching game seven, all others are ignored. It is not necessary for the four games to be won consecutively. Draws are not permitted, even in sports where they usually would be; play continues until there is a winner. (Note: Except in Japanese professional baseball, where a standard (12-inning) tie is permitted at the stepladder league playoff (higher seed wins if series tied after the five or seven game series ends), and a 12-inning tie is permitted in the Japan Series in all but the eighth game, played only if the series is tied, 3-3-1, after seven games) This ensures that a series will never require more than seven games. (Note: There are rare exceptions. The 1912 World Series was played in an era without artificial stadium lighting, and needed to be extended to eight games due to a tie game being called on account of darkness. The 1986 Japan Series also required eight games after a tie in game 1.)

The schedule is arranged so that the team with home advantage—the team that had the better regular-season record plays the first game and the decisive seventh game (if necessary) at home. Most best-of-seven series follow a "2–3–2" format or a "2–2–1–1–1" format; that is, in a 2–3–2 series, the first two games are played at the home venue of a team with the home-field advantage (the first "2"), the next three games (the "3", including game 5, if necessary) are played at the home of the team without it, and the final two games (the last "2", if necessary) are played at the home of the team with the advantage. In a "2–2–1–1–1" format, the first two games are played at the team with the better record venue (the first "2"), the next two at the team with the worse record (the next "2"), and then alternating venues for the fifth, sixth and seventh games (the next three "1"s), if necessary. An "odd–even" format is used in the postseason tournaments of the Liiga in Finland and the Swedish Hockey League.

Major League Baseball (MLB) has used a best-of-seven format for the League Championship Series since 1985, and for the World Series between 1905 and 1918, and since 1922. (Note: Note that not all MLB playoffs use a best-of-seven series. The first-round Wild Card Series uses a best-of-three format; the second-round Division Series uses a best-of-five format.) MLB uses the "2–3–2" format. Use of a 2-2-1-1-1 format in baseball would enable teams to only use a few starting pitchers since there is an off day whenever travel to the other team's stadium occurs. (There is an off day because of the rule which requires teams to have an off day when traveling from Pacific Time to Eastern Time, and since the postseason is scheduled without knowing the participating teams, it has to account for that possibility.) Use of 2-3-2 is considered more fair because teams are forced to use most or all of their starting pitcher rotation.

The National Basketball Association (NBA) uses a "2–2–1–1–1" format for all playoff rounds including the Finals. From the Finals' inception in 1947, the championship round used a "2–2–1–1–1" format (except in 1971, 1975, 1978 and 1979). It was changed to a "2–3–2" format between 1985–2013 to reduce travel expenses, as the league's "East-West" divisional alignment means the two teams are usually separated by great distances. For instance, the cities represented in the Finals' most frequent matchup, Los Angeles and Boston, are almost 3,000 miles (4,800 km) apart. The "2–2–1–1–1" format was restored in 2014. Starting in 2025, the WNBA will use the best-of-seven format for the WNBA Finals.

The National Hockey League uses a best-of-seven series for all rounds of its league-championship Stanley Cup playoffs, but uses the "2–2–1–1–1" format. The AHL and the ECHL do not use a set playoff format for their league championship playoff tournaments due to scheduling conflicts. For example, in the 2016 Calder Cup playoffs, due to scheduling conflicts in both arenas, the Pacific Division finals between the Ontario Reign and the San Diego Gulls used the "odd-even" playoff format, with Ontario hosting the odd games.

The Chinese, Italian, Lithuanian, Polish and Turkish basketball leagues use a best-of-seven format in their championship series. The Turkish playoff has one unique feature: if one team in a playoff series defeated its opponent in both of their regular-season games, the winning team is granted a 1–0 lead in the series, and the series starts with game two. The Philippine Basketball Association uses a best-of-seven series for its finals, as well as for most its semifinals of the PBA Philippine Cup since 2005.

Occasionally, WWE uses this format in some of their matches, such as for the feud between Chris Benoit and Booker T in 2005 for the WWE United States Championship, and for Antonio Cesaro's rivalry against Sheamus at August pay-per-view Summerslam 2016.

Nippon Professional Baseball's final championship round, the Japan Series, uses a best-of-seven playoff with a 2–3–2+ format. However, since games can end in ties in that league due to innings limits, once further games are necessary, there are no innings limits and starting in 2021, the WBSC two-runner tiebreaker will be used starting in the 13th inning following the normal limit of 12 innings. Through 2022, only one such game has ever been required.

=== Best-of-nine playoff ===
A best-of-nine playoff (also known as a first-to-five playoff) is a head-to-head competition between two teams in which one team must win five games to win the series. Five is chosen as it constituted a majority of the games played; if one team wins the series before reaching game 9, all others are ignored.

In Major League Baseball, the World Series was conducted as a best-of-nine playoff in its first year of existence in 1903, then again for three years beginning in 1919, the year of the "Black Sox scandal."

The Western Hockey League used the best-of-nine playoff series for the Western Division playoffs from the 1983–84 season through the 1990–91 season because of the unequal division alignment of the league at the time. The Eastern division had eight teams, six of which qualified for the playoffs. The Western division only had six teams, four of which made the playoffs. Because of this, the Eastern division had three rounds of playoffs (two teams received a first-round bye), while the Western division only had two rounds of playoffs. The east played a best-of-five, best-of-seven, best-of-seven format for the three rounds, while both rounds in the Western division playoffs were best-of-nine. This was used so that both divisions would finish their playoffs at approximately the same time. The WHL Championship Series was a best-of-seven. These best-of-nine series went the full nine games on two occasions, with the Portland Winterhawks defeating the New Westminster Bruins in 1984 and the Spokane Chiefs in 1986, respectively.

The Quebec Major Junior Hockey League used the best-of-nine playoff series for the 1986 playoffs.

=== Higher number of games ===
In snooker, a player must win a certain number of frames to win a match, often nine (best-of-17) or more. Again, if one player wins nine frames before all 17 are played, all others are ignored. The world championship final is currently decided in a best-of-35 match.

In 9-ball, a player must win a certain number of racks to win a match. In the WPA World Nine-ball Championship, nine racks are needed to win in the early stages, ten to eleven in the latter stages, and seventeen in the final. As with snooker, if one player wins nine frames before all seventeen are played, all others are ignored.

In chess, the World Chess Championship uses a best-of-fourteen-games format, with the winner needing to attain 7.5 points or more. If both players are tied after 14 games, tiebreaks with rapid time format are used.

== Total points series (aggregate) ==
Various playoff formats, including two-legged ties and total points series pair off participants in a number of games (often two), with the winner being determined by aggregate score: the winner being the one who scores the most points/goals etc. over the series of games. Two-legged ties are common in association football, and were used in NHL playoff series until 1937. It was used in North America in the MLS Cup Playoffs until the 2019 season.

In 2004, NASCAR adopted a total points playoff, creating a "Chase for the Cup" that allowed the top 10 drivers in points to qualify for the playoffs after 26 races into the 36-race season. These 10 drivers had their points 'reset' to an arbitrarily larger value, insuring any driver from 11th on the back is eliminated from championship contention and the top 10 are equal in points. The Chase format has changed several times since its creation including expanding the number of drivers from 10 to 12 and currently 16, and awarding bonus points for regular season wins when reseeding for the playoffs. (Note: In the 2007 season, the Chase was expanded to include the top 12 drivers after 26 races. The points of the drivers in the cut are elevated beyond those of the pack. From 2007 to 2010, each Chase driver received 5,000 points, with a 10-point bonus for each race won prior to the Chase.; Starting in 2011, the points system and Chase qualification criteria were significantly changed. Through the 2013 season, the top 10 drivers after 26 races automatically qualified for the Chase, joined by the two drivers with the most race wins among those ranked between 11th and 20th in points after 26 races. Reflecting a major change to the points system, in which the race winner can now earn a maximum of 48 points as opposed to 195 in the former system, driver points were reset to a base of 2,000. After the reset, automatic qualifiers received 3 bonus points for each race win, while the wild card qualifiers did not receive a bonus for wins. In the 2013 season, a 13th driver (Jeff Gordon) was added to the Chase following a major scandal in the final pre-Chase race in which two teams were found to have manipulated the race results in the final laps.; The 2014 season introduced a different format, although the basic points system remains identical to that in the 2011–2013 period. Under the current system, the Monster Energy field, now officially called the "Monster Energy Grid", consists of 16 drivers. These drivers are determined primarily on the basis of number of wins during the first 26 races, provided that said drivers are in the top 30 in series points and have attempted to qualify for each race (barring injuries). The points leader is assured of a place on the Grid, but only if he does not have a race win. Any remaining spots on the Grid are filled in order of driver points. The format from this point is radically different—the Chase is now divided into four rounds, with three races in each of the first three rounds and a one-race finale.; As in the 2011–2013 format, initial driver points are reset to 2,000 with a 3-point bonus for each win. All 16 Grid drivers compete to remain in the Chase for the first three Chase races, known as the "Challenger Round". After these races, the four lowest-placed drivers on the Grid are eliminated; they retain their points from the previous races and accumulate points in the remaining races based on the regular-season scoring system (this also applies to drivers eliminated at later stages). The winner of each of the first three races automatically advances to the next round of the Chase.; The next round, the "Contender Round", starts with 12 drivers, each with 3,000 points but with no win bonus. As in the Challenger Round, the winner of each race in this round advances to the next round. As in the previous round, the four drivers with the lowest points total after this round are eliminated.; The third round, the "Eliminator Round", starts with eight drivers, each with 4,000 points, again with no win bonus. As in the previous rounds, the winner of each race in this round advances to the next round. Again, the four drivers with the lowest points total after this round are eliminated.; The last race of the season starts with four drivers still in contention for the championship; each starts the race with 5,000 points. The highest finisher of the four becomes Monster Energy Cup champion.; Regardless of the exact format, the driver in the Chase group with the most points after the final ten races wins the Monster Energy Cup.)

In November 2005, the PGA Tour announced that a total points playoff would be used to lead up to the PGA Championship starting in 2007. The player with the most points at the end of the year would take home the FedEx Cup.

Prior to the 1986 playoffs, the Canadian Hockey League (especially the Ontario Hockey League) used the point series to determine which team would advance. The higher-seeded team would host the odd-numbered games (games 1, 3, 5 and 7), while the lower-seeded team hosts the even-numbered games (games 2, 4, 6 and 8). There would be no overtime except for the deciding game, because a tie in the last game of the series would not declare a series winner. If the last game were to finish in a tie, there would be a sudden-death overtime, with the winner getting two points and the losing team getting none.

The game shows Jeopardy!, Wheel of Fortune and The Challengers have used two-game series in their final rounds. Each game is played separately (i.e., money from day one cannot be wagered on day two), and the money from both games is added together to determine the winner. The only exception to this was in the Jeopardy! Ultimate Tournament of Champions held in 2005, when the two semifinal matches were both two-game series, and the final was a three-game series. If any ties remain, sudden death was played to determine the champion.

=== Example ===
The 2020–21 UEFA Champions League knockout phase:

February 17, 2021

Porto (Portugal)	2–1	(Italy) Juventus

Estádio do Dragão, Porto
March 9, 2021

Juventus (Italy)	3–2	(Portugal) Porto

Juventus Stadium, Turin

Porto 4–4 Juventus on aggregate. Porto won on away goals (POR 2–1 JUV).

== Round robin ==
In a round-robin tournament, all playoff contenders play each other an equal number of times, usually once or twice (the latter is often called a "double round robin").

This is a common tournament format in association football. In the FIFA World Cup, teams are organized into eight pools of four teams, with each team playing the other three once. Standings are determined by points earned through wins (3 points) and draws (1 point). The top two teams advance out of each pool to the knockout phase, where the first-place team from each pool faces a second-place team from a different pool.

Continental club football tournaments have included round robin formats, such as the 1966 Copa Libertadores, UEFA Champions League from the 1992–93 season, UEFA Cup from 2004 to 2005, and the Asian and African Champions Leagues. Teams are seeded so the strongest teams do not meet until the later rounds of the tournament. In the UEFA Champions League, 32 teams are divided into eight groups of four. The group winners and runners-up advance to play a two-legged tie. The third-place teams move into the UEFA Cup (Europa League) third round, and the fourth-place teams are eliminated.

In basketball, the Olympics uses a round robin of the same nature, switching to single elimination after the first round. The Euroleague has two double round-robin phases. The first is a "Regular Season" in which the 24 teams are divided into four groups of six (as of the 2008–09 season). The top four teams in each group advance to a "Top 16" phase in which the teams are divided into four groups of four each. The top two teams from each group are then paired in four best-of-five quarterfinal series, with the winners advancing to the single-elimination final four.

Round-robin tournaments are also used in rugby union, curling and many amateur or lower-division basketball, football and hockey tournaments.

In 1992, the Little League World Series went to a round-robin tournament in the first round, instead of single-elimination. In 2001, the tournament expanded to 16 teams and stayed with a round robin for the first round, but cross-bracketed single elimination for the second round before the two winners of those games advanced to the regional final. Little League used this format through 2009.

In Major League Baseball, the term "round-robin" was used with regard to the possibility of a three-way tie for the 1964 National League (NL) pennant. The Philadelphia Phillies had had a 6 1/2-game lead with 12 games left in their regular season. They then lost 10 games in a row, and on the final day of the season, three teams were still competing for the National League pennant. The St. Louis Cardinals defeated the New York Mets to take the NL pennant with no playoff; the opposite outcome would have left the Cardinals, Phillies and Cincinnati Reds in a three-way tie.

=== Example ===
The "Super Six" round of the 1999 Cricket World Cup:

Team	Pts	Pld	W	L	NR	T	NRR	PCF
Pakistan	6	5	3	2	0	0	0.65	4
Australia	6	5	3	2	0	0	0.36	0
South Africa	6	5	3	2	0	0	0.17	2
New Zealand	5	5	2	2	1	0	−0.52	2
Zimbabwe	5	5	2	2	1	0	−0.79	4
India	2	5	1	4	0	0	−0.15	0

Teams in shaded in blue advance to the knockout stage.

A Swiss-system tournament is a variant used for competitions in which there are too many entrants for a full round-robin to be feasible, and eliminating any competitors before the end of the tournament is undesirable.

Match pairings for each round are done after the previous round has ended. Competitors are paired using a set of rules designed to ensure that each competitor plays opponents with a similar running score, but does not play the same opponent more than once. The winner is the competitor with the highest aggregate points earned in over a fixed number of rounds.

The system was first employed at a chess tournament in Zurich in 1895 by Julius Müller, hence the name "Swiss system", and is also used for other table games including go, bridge and Scrabble.

== Associated concepts ==
=== Reseeding ===
In tournaments where participants are seeded, the participants may be "reseeded" at each round in order to ensure that the strongest remaining team faces the weakest team. This type of tournament bracket is not fixed; potential match-ups cannot be anticipated up to the final. For example, in an eight-team bracket, the teams that will meet in the second round will be the winning team with the highest beginning seed against the first-round winner with the lowest original seed. The second-highest-winning seed faces the winning team with the second-lowest original seed.

The only notable tournaments that employ this rule are the NFL playoffs and WNBA playoffs. The MLB postseason, NBA playoffs, the NCAA basketball tournaments (men and women), and most tennis tournaments, elect not to reseed, despite the possibility of reseeding resulting in different matchups. In the NHL's current format, reseeding would not be able to change the matchups, however in previous formats such as from 1975–81, 1994-2013, the NHL used reseeding.

==== Example ====
The 1994 Stanley Cup playoffs (scores in the bracket shown indicate the number of games won in each seven-game series):

Conference quarterfinals	Conference semifinals
1	NY Rangers	4
8	NY Islanders	0
1	NY Rangers	4
7	Washington	1
2	Pittsburgh	2
7	Washington	4
Eastern Conference
3	New Jersey	4
6	Buffalo	3
3	New Jersey	4
4	Boston	2
4	Boston	4
5	Montreal	3
1	Detroit	3
8	San Jose	4
3	Toronto	4
8	San Jose	3
2	Calgary	3
7	Vancouver	4
Western Conference
3	Toronto	4
6	Chicago	2
4	Dallas	1
7	Vancouver	4
4	Dallas	4
5	St. Louis	0

Conference finals
1	NY Rangers	4
3	New Jersey	3
3	Toronto	1
7	Vancouver	4

Stanley Cup Final
E1	NY Rangers	4
W7	Vancouver	3

=== Home advantage ===
In team sports, the "home-field advantage" refers to the phenomenon where a team (usually the higher-seeded team) is given more home games than away games. This is seen in a best-of series by more games being played in one team's arena/stadium than the other, and in single-elimination tournaments by the single game being held in one team's stadium. In a best-of series, a team can "lose" their home advantage if the visiting team wins the first game.

A team can clinch the home-field advantage in a variety of ways:

- Clinching the higher seed (MLB, NHL, and NFL)
- Winning more games than the opponent, but not necessarily clinching the higher seed (NBA)

In a best-of series, the order of arenas/stadiums in which the games are played also affects the home-field advantage. In the NBA and the NHL, all rounds are played in a "2–2–1–1–1" format. That is, the team with home-field advantage plays games 1, 2, 5, and 7 (if necessary) at home. This ensures that, if the home team wins every game, the team with home-field advantage never trails in the series. From 1985 to 2013, the NBA finals used the "2–3–2" format (the team with the home-court advantage plays games 1, 2, 6, and 7 on their home court). This can theoretically allow the team with the home-court advantage to trail in the series (although that will require the team with the home-court advantage to lose the middle three games).

In Major League Baseball the best-of-7 rounds are played in a "2–3–2" format. This is to allow all games to be played in, in effect, location-consistent “sub-series” of 2 or 3 games. A "2–2–1–1–1" format could only be played in 2- and 3-game sub-series if the teams did not get days off for travel; however, the league gives teams an off day when traveling from Pacific Time to Eastern Time. Because teams from those time zones can possibly meet in any of the best-of-7 rounds, Major League Baseball always gives schedules to best-of-7 rounds that accommodate this travel feature.

In the Stanley Cup Final, the NBA finals, MLS Cup, and the World Series, the team with the better regular-season record receives the home-field advantage. The Super Bowl is held at a predetermined site regardless of which teams reach the game, which usually means there is no home advantage; it is possible for the host city's team to participate. Historically, World Series home-field advantage alternated between leagues on an annual basis; from 2003 to 2016 the league that won that season's All-Star Game earned home-field advantage, and since 2017 the team with the best regular-season record earned home-field advantage.

In soccer two-legged ties such as the UEFA Champions League or UEFA Europa League, the two teams each play one game in their respective home stadium. However, there is debate over whether either team has an advantage. While one team has the home-field advantage by playing the clinching match at home, the away goals tiebreaker arguably favors the away side.

In games played in neutral venues, a team may still be afforded the privileges of the "home team," such as selecting which side of the field to defend first (or last). In most instances, this privilege is determined either by a drawing of lots (UEFA Champions League) or by rotation among the groupings of the different teams (NFL).

In the Nippon Professional Baseball league's postseason games (excluding Japan Series) since 2004, the team with the higher regular-season standing will host all the games. In addition, since 2008, the league champion will have a one-win advantage in the second stage of the Climax Series (technically a best-of-seven series, though in practice only six games are played, because the regular-season champion starts with a 1–0 advantage).

== See also ==
- McIntyre system
- Page playoff system
- Playoff
- Season (sport)
