= Waitakere rugby league team =

The Waitakere rugby league team could mean:

- The Waitakere City Raiders who played between 1994 and 1996; or
- The Waitakere Rangers who played between 2006 and 2008.
