= Anthony Murray (New Zealand rugby league) =

New Zealand rugby league footballer and coach

Personal information
- Full name: Anthony Charles Murray
- Born: 14 October 1959 New Zealand
- Died: 16 May 2006 (aged 46) New Zealand

Playing information
- Position: Prop
Club
| Years | Team | Pld | T | G | FG | P |
|---|---|---|---|---|---|---|
| | Takahiwai Warriors |
| 1980–81 | Wigan Warriors | 2 | 0 | 0 | 0 | 0 |
| | Total | 2 | 0 | 0 | 0 | 0 |
Representative
| Years | Team | Pld | T | G | FG | P |
| | Northland |
| | Northern Districts |
| | New Zealand Māori |

Coaching information
Representative
| Years | Team | Gms | W | D | L | W% |
| 1991–92 | Northland |

Anthony Murray (died 16 May 2006) was a New Zealand rugby league footballer and coach who played professionally for Wigan.

== Playing career ==
Murray played for the Takahiwai Warriors alongside his twin brother, Thomas. During the 1980–81 Rugby Football League season, Murray played for the Wigan club and made two appearances off the bench.

Murray was a Northland and Northern Districts representative and played for the New Zealand Māori, touring Britain in 1983 and competing in the 1986 Pacific Cup.

== Coaching career ==
Murray coached Northland in 1991 and 1992.

== Later years ==
Murray was later influential, along with Harry Clyde, in getting the Northern Storm accepted into the 2006 Bartercard Cup.

== Personal life ==
Murray belonged to the Ngāti Haua subtribe of the Te Rarawa iwi (Māori tribe).

Murray collapsed and died on 16 May 2006 aged 46. The Northern Storm's first win, 40-22 against Wellington on the following weekend, was dedicated to Murray.
