= Northland rugby league team =

New Zealand sports team

Northern Swords

Club information
- Full name: Northern Swords Rugby League
- Nickname: Swords
- Short name: Northern Swords
- Website: northernswords.co.nz

Current details
- Ground: Otaika Sport Park, Whangarei
- CEO: Robbie Johnson
- Coach: Vern Wilson
- Competition: New Zealand Rugby League

Records
- Rugby League Cup: 1931

The Northland rugby league team are a rugby league team that represents the Northland Region in New Zealand Rugby League competitions. They are based in Whangārei. They currently compete in the Albert Baskerville Trophy as the Northern Swords.

Between 2006 and 2007 they were part of the Bartercard Cup, playing under the name the Northern Storm. Northland was originally known as North Auckland and has previously used the nickname the Wild Boars.

The 2015 captain is Chris Bamford.

== History ==
Northlands first season was 1929 and they challenged Auckland for the Northern Union Cup, losing 22–19.

== 2006-2007: Bartercard Cup ==
The Northern Storm logo

The Northern Storm joined the Bartercard Cup in time for the 2006 season. There inclusion was due to the work of Anthony Murray and Harry Clyde.

The Storm's first win was 40–22 against Wellington and was dedicated to Murray who had died earlier that week.

=== Notable players ===
New Zealand Warriors associated with the Northern Storm included Todd Byrne & Grant Rovelli.

=== 2006 results ===
In the Northern Storm's debut season in 2006 the club performed poorly, managing only two wins and two draws from eighteen matches. They finished in last position on the table, collecting the Wooden Spoon.

A bright point of the season was that fullback Brendon Hikaka, centre Mason Pure and hooker Linton Price were all selected for the Junior Kiwis.

Season	Pld	W	D	L	PF	PA	PD	Pts	Position (Teams)	Finals
2006	18	2	2	14	314	802	-488	6	Wooden Spoon (Ten)	N/A

=== 2007 results ===
Before the season started 2006 Head Coach Geoff Morton moved South and joined the Counties Manukau Jetz. He was replaced by Phil Marsh. The Storm started the season strongly with big wins against the Jetz (54-28) and Central Falcons (48-24). However they then suffered heavy losses to both the Waitakere Rangers (66-16) and league leaders the Auckland Lions (70-8). The squad showed improvement since 2006 but they again finished near the bottom of the table.

Season	Pld	W	D	L	PF	PA	PD	Pts	Position (Teams)
2007	18	4	0	14	372	730	-358	8	Eighth (10)

== Notable players ==
Frank Pickrang (played for New Zealand before moving to Whangārei to play for City in 1939).
