= Michael Crockett =

Australian rugby league footballer (born 1983)

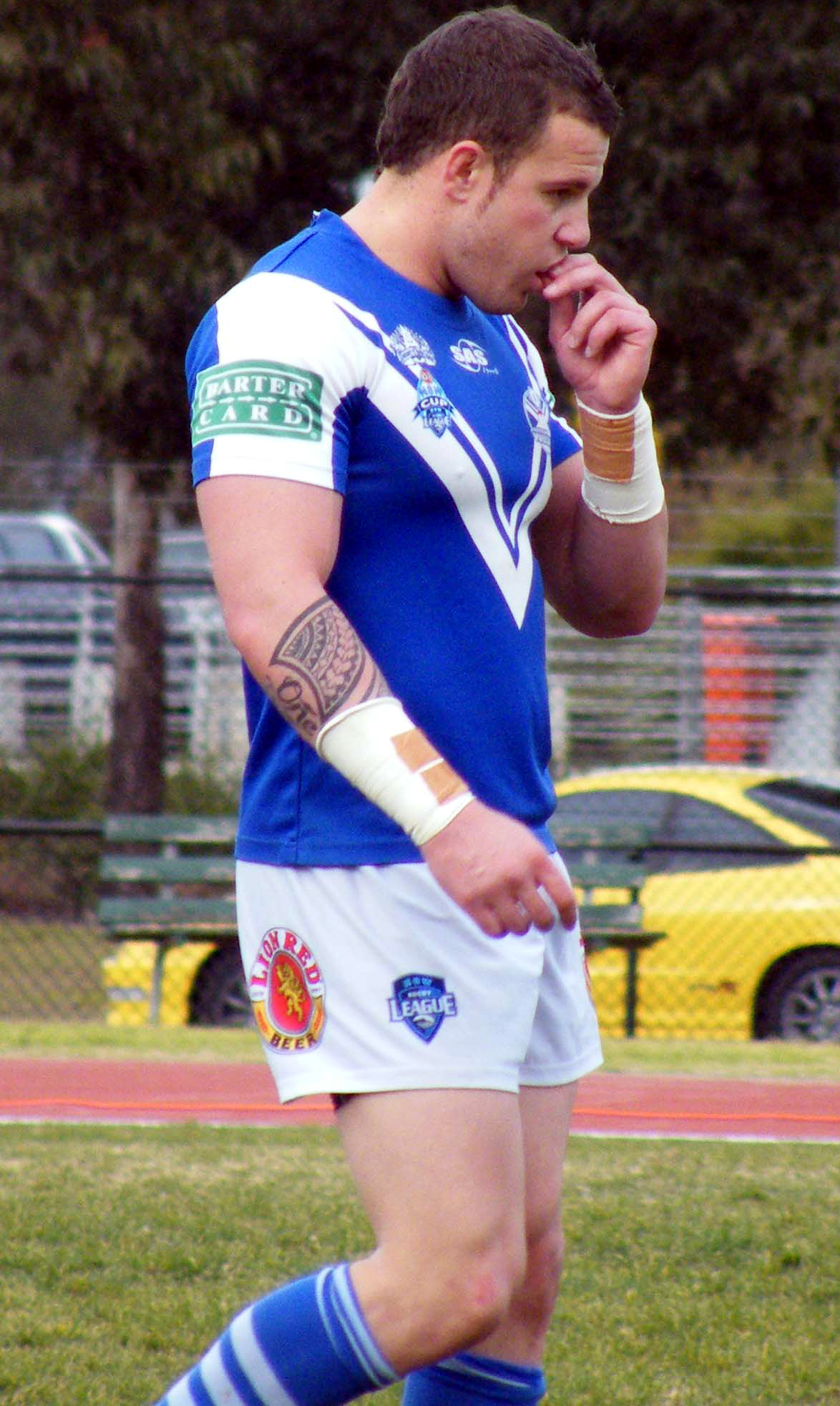

Personal information
- Full name: Michael Wayne Crockett
- Born: 16 March 1983 (age 43) Nowra, New South Wales, Australia

Playing information
- Height: 180 cm (5 ft 11 in)
- Weight: 91 kg (14 st 5 lb)
- Position: Wing
Club
| Years | Team | Pld | T | G | FG | P |
|---|---|---|---|---|---|---|
| 2006 | Wests Tigers | 8 | 7 | 0 | 0 | 28 |
| 2007–08 | New Zealand Warriors | 20 | 11 | 0 | 0 | 44 |
| | Total | 28 | 18 | 0 | 0 | 72 |

Michael Crockett (born 16 March 1983) is an Australian former professional rugby league player. His position of choice was on the wing.

== Early years ==
Crockett started his rugby league career playing for the Nowra Warriors. He was then a junior at the St George Illawarra Dragons club for two years from 2003. In 2005 he moved to Melbourne and joined the Melbourne Storm. He spent one year with the club before moving to Sydney to join the Wests Tigers. Crockett made his first grade debut for the Wests Tigers in round 1 of the 2006 NRL season. He played in eight games for the club that year, scoring seven tries.

== Warriors ==
The New Zealand Warriors then signed him on a two-year deal and he played 14 games for the club in 2007. He was sent off in round 12 while playing against the Canterbury-Bankstown Bulldogs for a high shot on Cameron Phelps.

When not selected by the Warriors, Crockett played for the Auckland Vulcans in the NSW Cup and for the Counties Manukau Jetz in the Bartercard Cup.

On 13 August 2007 while in Sydney with the New Zealand Warriors, he was charged with sexual assault by the New South Wales police. However the charges were later dismissed, after over a year of legal proceedings.

Crockett failed to impress in 2008, playing only six games for the club and often being overlooked for played such as Malo Solomona, Aidan Kirk and Manu Vatuvei. He was not offered a new contract by the club when his two-year deal expired.

== Illawarra ==
Crockett joined Paul McGregor at the Western Suburbs Red Devils club in the Illawarra Rugby League competition. In 2012 he was called up to play for the Illawarra Cutters in the NSW Cup.
