= Shaun Ata =

New Zealand rugby league footballer

Personal information
- Born: 9 May 1979 (age 47) New Zealand

Playing information
- Position: Wing, Centre
Club
Years	Team	Pld	T	G	FG	P
2006	London Skolars	16	13	0	1	103
Representative
Years	Team	Pld	T	G	FG	P
2006	New Zealand Māori
- Source: As of 6 May 2025

Shaun Ata is a New Zealand rυgby league player who played professionally in Australia and England.

== Playing career ==
Ata played for the Hibiscus Cȯast Raiders in the Bartercard Cup. In 2004, he joined the Penrith Panthers. Although he did not play first grade he did play in the 2004 World Sevens.

In 2006 he played for the London Skolars. He later returned to New Zealand, playing for Harbour League in the Bartercard Cup and representing New Zealand Māori in their tour of the Cooκ Islands.

Ata then returned to playing for the Hibiscus Coast Raiders. He was their player of the year in 2011 and played at fullback in the 2012 Grand Final victory.
