= Meli Koliavu =

Fiji international rugby league player (born 1989)

Personal information
- Born: 24 July 1989 (age 37)
- Height: 184 cm (6 ft 0 in)
- Weight: 96 kg (15 st 2 lb)

Playing information
- Position: Wing, Centre
Representative
Years	Team	Pld	T	G	FG	P
2009	Fiji

Meli Koliavu is a Fijian rugby league player who represented Fiji.

== Playing career ==
Koliavu attended St. Patrick's College and represented the Wellington Orcas in the 2006 and 2007 Bartercard Cups.

In 2008, Koliavu signed with the New Zealand Warriors Toyota Cup team alongside fellow Orcas Ben Matulino and Alehana Mara.

Between 2008 and 2010, Koliavu also played for the Auckland Vulcans in the NSW Cup and the Richmond Rovers in the Auckland Rugby League competition. At the end of the 2009 season, Koliavu was no longer eligible for the under-20 side and the New Zealand Warriors failed to offer him a senior squad contract.

== Representative career ==
Koliavu was a Junior Kiwi in 2006 and played for the New Zealand Under-18's in 2007.

Koliavu represented Fiji at the 2009 Pacific Cup.
