= Miguel Start =

Samoa international rugby league footballer

Personal information
- Full name: Miguel Start
- Born: 30 November 1987 (age 38) Auckland, New Zealand
- Height: 184 cm (6 ft 0 in)
- Weight: 99 kg (15 st 8 lb)

Playing information
- Position: Centre
Representative
Years	Team	Pld	T	G	FG	P
2006	Samoa	5	1	0	0	4

Miguel Start (born 30 November 1987) is a former Samoa international rugby league footballer who played as a centre.

== Background ==
Start was born in Auckland, New Zealand.

== Playing career ==
Start was educated at Mount Albert Grammar School, and played for the Pakuranga Jaguars in the Auckland Rugby League competition.

In 2005 Start represented the Junior Kiwis in 2005. He played for both the New Zealand Residents and Samoa in 2006.

Start was signed with the New Zealand Warriors in the National Rugby League competition for 2007. Start did not make his NRL debut but did appear in the NSWRL Premier League for the Auckland Lions.
