= Cliff Beverley =

New Zealand rugby league footballer

Personal information
- Full name: Clifford Beverley
- Born: 25 March 1977 (age 49) New Zealand

Playing information
- Height: 183 cm (6 ft 0 in)
- Weight: 88 kg (13 st 12 lb)
- Position: Fullback, Five-eighth
Club
Years	Team	Pld	T	G	FG	P
1995	Waitakere City	4	0	0	0	0
1999–01	Auckland Warriors	44	8	0	0	32
2002	Barrow Raiders
2003–05	Salford City Reds	73	34	1	0	138
	Total	121	42	1	0	170

Cliff Beverley (born 25 March 1977) is a New Zealand former professional rugby league footballer. His preferred position was five-eighth, although he was somewhat of a utility and spent considerable time at fullback.

== Background ==
Beverley was born in New Zealand.

== Early years ==
A junior from the Glenora club, his childhood hero was Wally Lewis. Beverley played in the 1995 Lion Red Cup for the Waitakere City Raiders. He also represented Auckland in the 1998 domestic season and Auckland North in 1999.

== Warriors ==
Beverley signed for the then Auckland Warriors in 1999. He made his début in round four, replacing an injured Matthew Ridge. He played 44 National Rugby League games for the club, half of them from the bench.

== England ==
In 2001 Beverley moved to England to play for the Barrow Raiders in the National Leagues. He then transferred to the Salford City Reds in 2002. Here he topped the try-scoring list, scoring 38 tries, and helped the club win the National League One Grand Final and promotion to the Super League. After receiving interest from several Super League clubs including Hull F.C. and St. Helens he decided to remain at Salford City Reds to help them succeed in the top division. He remained with the club for two more years, playing 48 Super League games.

== Later years ==
Beverley returned to New Zealand at the end of the 2005 season citing home sickness. He then joined the new Waitakere Rangers franchise in the Bartercard Cup before retiring at the end of 2007.
