= Martin Mitchell =

Cook Islands international rugby league footballer

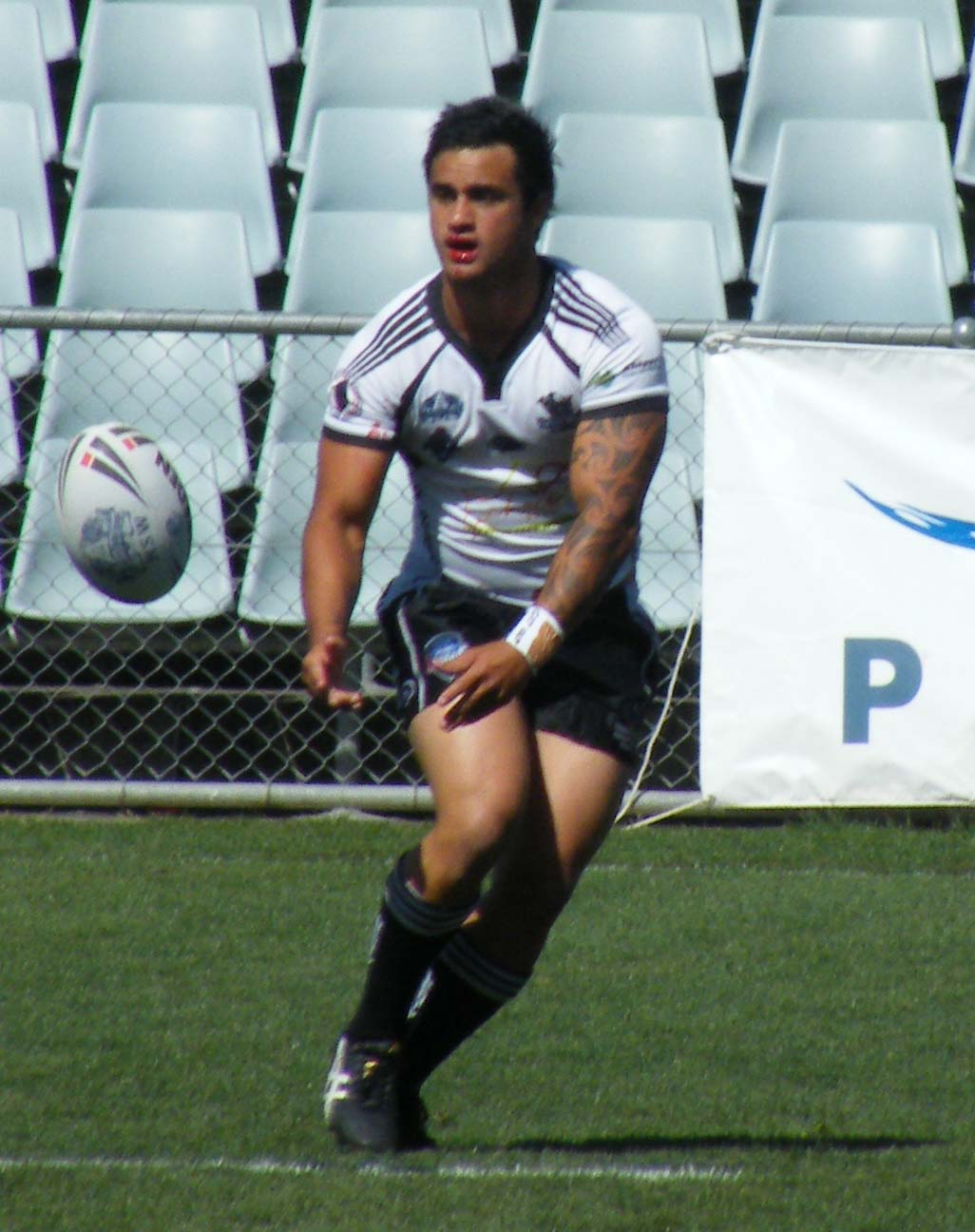

Personal information
- Born: 21 October 1985 (age 40) Auckland, New Zealand
- Height: 180 cm (5 ft 11 in)
- Weight: 89 kg (14 st 0 lb)

Playing information
- Position: Hooker, Scrum-half
Club
Years	Team	Pld	T	G	FG	P
2008	Wentworthville Magpies
2009–10	Toulouse Olympique	18	6	0	0	24
	Total	18	6	0	0	24
Representative
Years	Team	Pld	T	G	FG	P
2005–10	Cook Islands
- Source: As of 6 January 2010

Martin Mitchell (born 21 October 1985) is a Cook Islands international rugby league footballer who plays as a hooker or halfback for the Southport Tigers A grade team in the Coast to Coast Earth moving Cup on the Gold Coast.

== Background ==
Mitchell was born in Auckland, New Zealand, and is of Cook Islander descent.

== Playing career ==
Mitchell has previously played for the Mt Albert Lions in the Auckland Rugby League, the Auckland Lions in the Bartercard Cup and the Auckland Lions and Wentworthville Magpies in the NSW Cup.

In 2009 and 2010 he played for Toulouse Olympique in the Co-operative Championship.

In 2010 Mitchell joined the Burleigh Bears in the Queensland Cup.

== Representative career ==
In 2010 Mitchell represented the Cook Islands in a match against the Country Rugby League. He had previously represented the side in 2005.
