= Paul Atkins (rugby league) =

New Zealand rugby league footballer

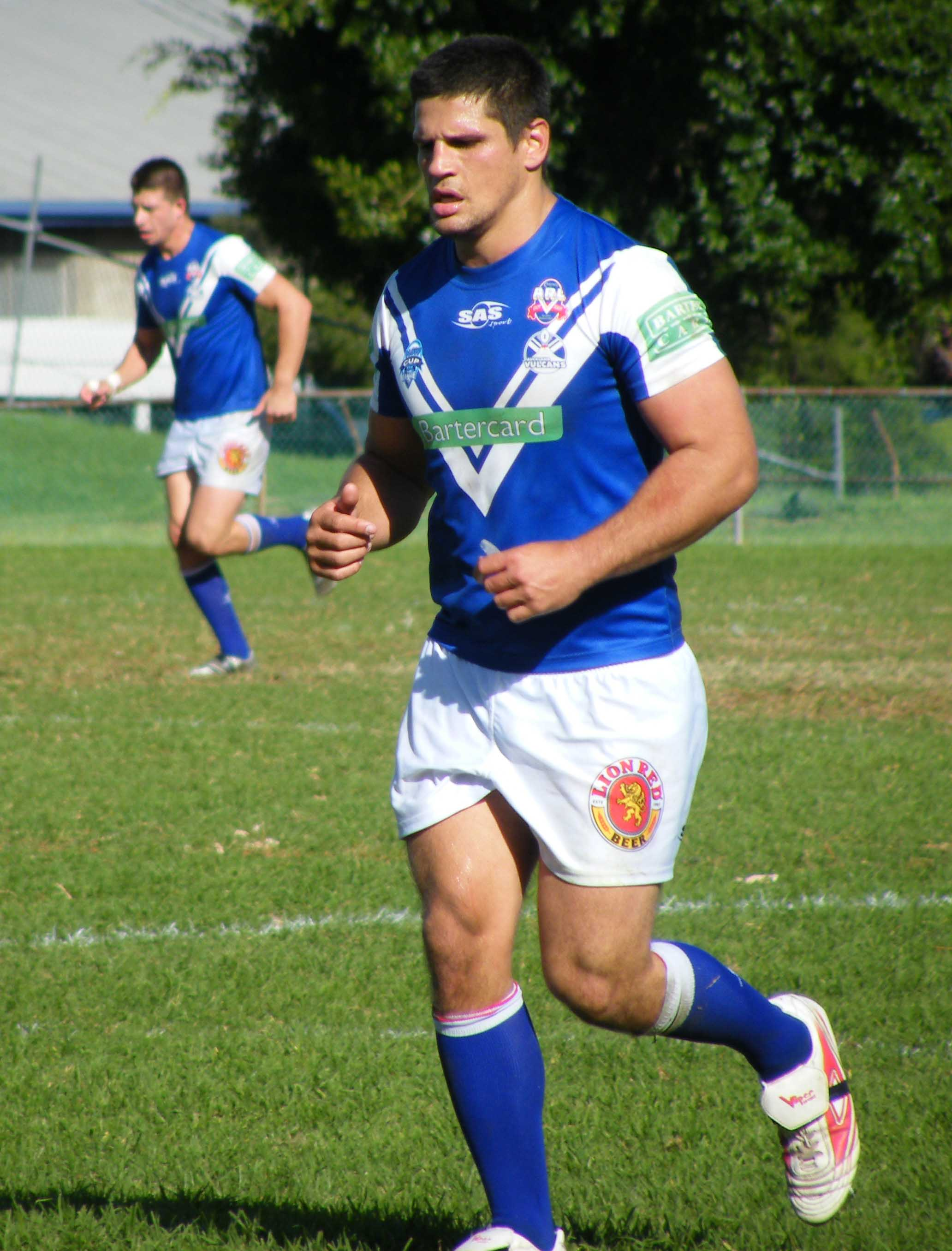

Personal information
- Born: 17 December 1982 (age 43) Auckland, New Zealand

Playing information
- Position: Fullback, Wing
Club
Years	Team	Pld	T	G	FG	P
2004	New Zealand Warriors	1	0	0	0	0
- Source: As of 09:03, 14 September 2008 (UTC)

Paul Atkins is a New Zealand former rugby league footballer. He played for the Otahuhu Leopards from 2002–2003, the Otahuhu-Ellerslie Leopards from 2004–2005, the Tamaki Leopards in 2006 and the Howick Hornets from 2007-2009.

== Playing career ==
In 2004 Atkins made his National Rugby League debut for the New Zealand Warriors. His single game from the interchange bench was against the Sydney Roosters in a brief but impressive debut.

Atkins came on midway through the second spell and was subsequently smashed in two massive tackles from Roosters enforcer Adrian Morley with his first two touches. The lightweight winger or fullback made the mistake of carting the ball straight up at one of the hardest hitters in the NRL but got straight to his feet on both occasions to his credit. Earning the praise of coach Tony Kemp. "Kids come out of the Bartercard Cup and the one thing I know they have in abundance is courage," Kemp said. "He has got the courage of a lionheart. I knew he has been one of the toughest kids I have been watching for two years so he obviously relished his opportunity but he left his step on the bench". "He definitely gave the players a lift when he went on,' Kemp said. "They took one look at him - the kid's only 80kg - and he didn't take a backward step. This is what we are trying to build."

Later that year he also represented both Auckland and New Zealand 'A' against a Jim Beam Selection.

In 2005 he was part of the New Zealand Universities side that won the Student World Cup in Australia. Atkins attended AUT University.

In 2006 he represented New Zealand Maori at the Pacific Cup.

In 2008 he joined the Auckland Vulcans in the NSW Cup.
