= Manawatu rugby league team =

Rugby League team in New Zealand

Club information
- Nickname: The Mustangs
- Founded: 1957
- Website: Manawatu rugby league website

Current details
- Grounds: Arena Manawatu; Fitzherbert Park; Coronation Park
- Coach: Ngati Rahiri Edwards

The Manawatu rugby league team are a rugby league team that represents the Manawatu Rugby League in New Zealand Rugby League competitions. They have the nickname the Mustangs and between 2002 and 2007 competed in the Bartercard Cup as the Central Falcons.

Manawatu has a strong domestic scene and clubs compete in the "Western Alliance" region alongside Taranaki clubs.

== History ==
Rugby league in the region was first recorded in 1924 when a match was played between a Manawatu side against Wellington. All Black Alphonsus Carroll was part of the Manawatu team and the following season he was selected for New Zealand to tour Australia. The match with Wellington was drawn 14-14 and was played at Foxton. However it was not until 1971 that Manawatu had its first ever registered win, against Bay of Plenty 24 - 19. The season remains the team's most successful.

=== Lion Red Cup ===
In 1996 a Manawatu team was entered into the Lion Red Cup, replacing the Auckland Warriors' Colts. They were called the Manawatu Mustangs. This team was coached by Peter Sixtus.

Season	Pld	W	D	L	PF	PA	PD	Pts	Position (Teams)	Finals
1996	22	5	0	17	404	732	-328	10	Eleventh (Twelve)	N/A

=== Bartercard Cup ===
Central Falcons

Club information
- Founded: 2002
- Exited: 2008

Former details
- Grounds: Arena Manawatu; Fitzherbert Park; Levin Oval

The Central Falcons were a franchise in the now defunct Bartercard Cup rugby league competition. They represented the Central North Island of New Zealand, playing home games in Palmerston North and Levin and were run by the Manawatu Rugby League. They were coached by former Kiwis international David Lomax.

They entered the competition in 2002 alongside the Taranaki Wildcats. They had a close relationship with the New Zealand Army and its base at Waiouru. In 2006 two New Zealand Warriors were assigned to the club; Micheal Luck & Steve Price.

Notable players included: Jesse Royal, Ricky Thorby and Russell Packer.

The side never made the finals and in the final season collected the wooden spoon. The club's best result was in 2005 when it finished Ninth out of Twelve teams.

Season	Pld	W	D	L	PF	PA	PD	Pts	Position (Teams)	Finals
2002	16	3	1	12	330	586	-256	7	Eleventh (Twelve)	N/A
2003	16	4	0	12	374	578	-204	8	Tenth (Twelve)	N/A
2004	16	4	2	10	376	508	-132	10	Tenth (Twelve)	N/A
2005	16	4	3	9	299	531	-232	11	Ninth (Twelve)	N/A
2006	18	6	0	12	415	678	-263	12	Ninth (Ten)	N/A
2007	18	1	1	16	384	868	-484	3	Tenth (10)	Wooden Spoon
