= Dean Clark (rugby league) =

New Zealand rugby league coach and footballer

Personal information
- Full name: Dean Gordon Clark
- Born: 6 January 1968 (age 58) New Zealand
- Height: 170 cm (5 ft 7 in)
- Weight: 88 kg (13 st 12 lb)

Playing information
- Position: Stand-off
Club
Years	Team	Pld	T	G	FG	P
	Otahuhu Leopards
1988	Eastern Suburbs	7	1	0	0	4
1991–94	Hull Kingston Rovers	19	7
1995–96	Counties Manukau	23	7	1	0	30
1996	Leeds Rhinos	13	3	0	0	12
	Total	62	18	1	0	46
Representative
Years	Team	Pld	T	G	FG	P
1989–97	Auckland
1989–92	New Zealand	7	2	0	0	8
1990–97	New Zealand Māori

Coaching information
Representative
Years	Team	Gms	W	D	L	W%
2006	New Zealand Māori

Dean Clark (born 6 January 1968) is a New Zealand rugby league coach and former footballer who represented New Zealand between 1989 and 1992.

== Playing career ==
An Otahuhu Leopards junior, Clark joined the Eastern Suburbs Roosters in 1988 playing in seven matches.

Clark then travelled to England, joining Hull Kingston Rovers in the English competition.

Clark returned to New Zealand in 1995, playing for the Counties Manukau Heroes in the Lion Red Cup.

Clark played with the Leeds Rhinos in 1996, but was released from the club after one season.

Clark then moved to the Mangere East Hawks, where he played in the 1998 Fox Memorial grand final.

In 1999 Clark joined the Otahuhu Leopards, and represented Auckland South.

== Representative career ==
An Auckland representative, Clark played for the Kiwis seven times between 1989 and 1992. He was a trialist in 1993 but did not make the final Kiwis side.

Clark represented the New Zealand Māori in 1990, 1995 and at the 1997 Oceania Cup.

Clark played for the New Zealand Residents in 1990, 1992 and 1995.

== Coaching career ==
In the 2000 Bartercard Cup Clark was the player-coach of the Otahuhu Leopards, his first coaching role. The Leopards made the grand final, losing 24–38 to the Canterbury Bulls.

Clark coached the Tamaki Titans between 2006 and 2007 in the Bartercard Cup. He was the coach of the New Zealand Māori in 2006.

He coached the Papakura Sea Eagles to seventh in 2010, and again in 2011.
