= Constantine Mika =

Samoa international rugby league footballer

Con Mika
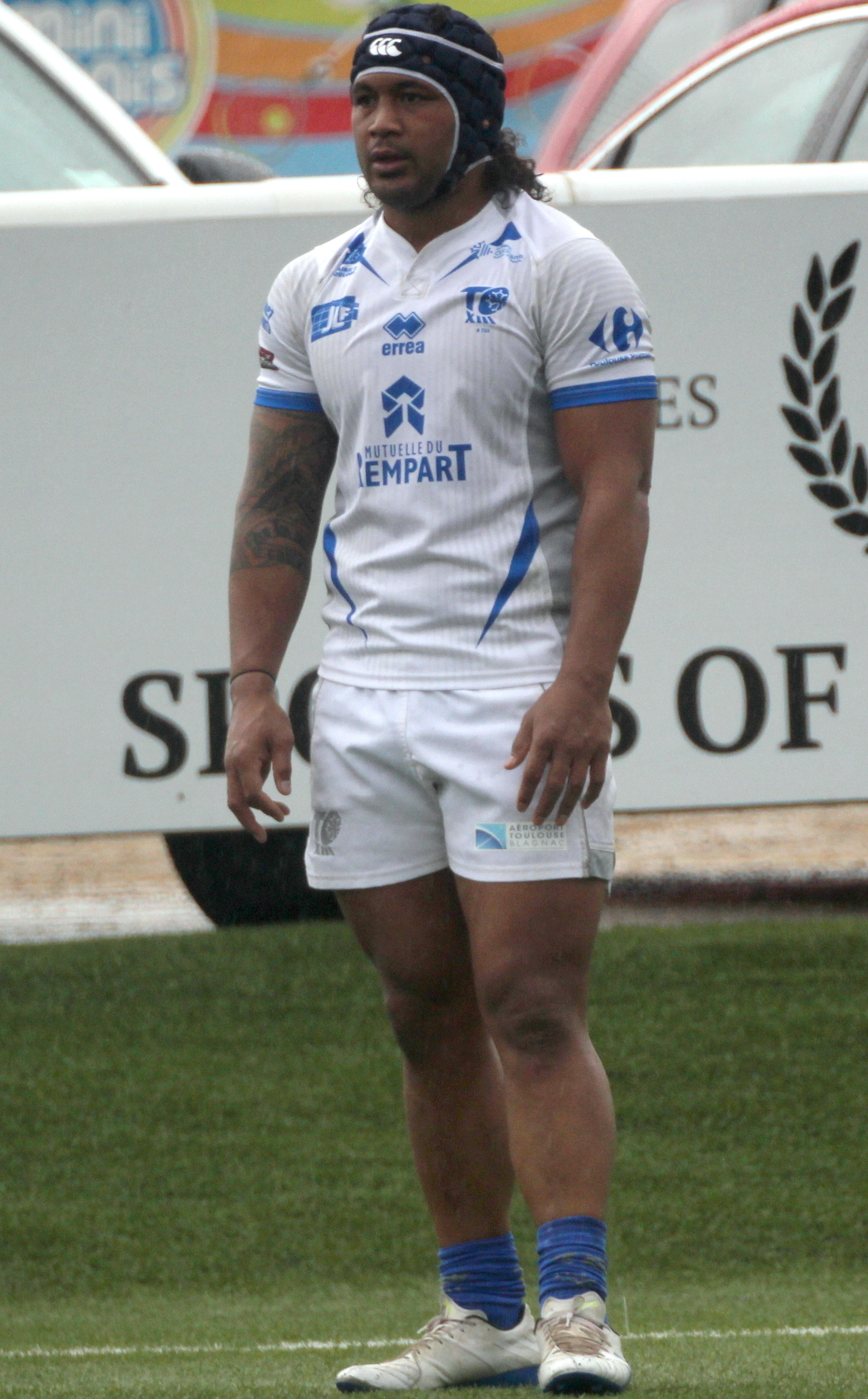

Personal information
- Full name: Constantine Mika
- Born: 14 September 1989 (age 37) Auckland, New Zealand
- Height: 182 cm (6 ft 0 in)
- Weight: 105 kg (16 st 7 lb)

Playing information

Rugby league
- Position: Second-row, Loose forward
Club
Years	Team	Pld	T	G	FG	P
2009–11	Newcastle Knights	14	1	0	0	4
2012–13	Hull Kingston Rovers	52	10	0	0	40
2016–20	Toulouse Olympique	93	27	0	0	108
2020–21	Villeneuve Leopards	17	0	0	0	0
2022–25	Limoux Grizzlies	47	16	0	0	20
	Total	223	54	0	0	172
Representative
Years	Team	Pld	T	G	FG	P
2010	Samoa	1	0	0	0	0
2012	Exiles	1	0	0	0	0

Rugby union
Club
Years	Team	Pld	T	G	FG	P
2015–16	Provence Rugby	16	0	0	0	0
- Source: As of 10 October 2022

Constantine Mika (born 14 September 1989) is a Samoa international rugby league footballer who plays as a second-row or loose forward for the XIII Limouxin. He previously played for the Newcastle Knights in the NRL, Hull Kingston Rovers in the Super League, Toulouse Olympique in the Championship, as well as a spell playing rugby union for Provence Rugby in the French Pro D2.

== Background ==
Mika was born in Auckland, New Zealand.

== Early years ==
Mika joined the New Zealand Warriors from the local Auckland Rugby League competition where he played for Otahuhu and the Tamaki Titans in the Bartercard Cup. He made two appearances in the Toyota Cup for the Junior Warriors, however he could not break into the Warriors first grade team.

== Newcastle Knights ==
Mika joined the Newcastle Knights from the 2009 season. He made his first grade début in round 12 on 31 May 2009 against Canterbury. In June 2010 he quoted "Coming over here was the best move I've made for my footy career,"

After the conclusion of the 2011 season, Mika was released by the Newcastle club.

== Hull Kingston Rovers ==
Mika signed with Rovers on 26 October 2011. It was a two-year deal to join, also departing from the Knights, the new Rovers head coach, Craig Sandercock and fullback Shannon McDonnell.

== Return to Australia ==
After completing a stint in the Super League, Mika returned to Australia to compete in the Queensland Cup and debuted for the Redcliffe Dolphins in 2014. The following year, Mika signed with the Wave Tigers of the Bundaberg Rugby League competition.

== France ==
Mika changed codes to rugby union and signed for newly promoted Provence Rugby of the Pro D2 in the summer of 2015, to play at centre.

=== Toulouse Olympique ===
After one season playing union Mika returned to rugby league to join Toulouse Olympique in 2016.

After four seasons with Toulouse Mike left to join another French team.

=== Villeneuve XIII RLLG ===
Mika signed for Villeneuve XIII RLLG in the Elite One Championship in July 2020 and played the rest of the French domestic season with the club

=== Brooklyn Kings ===
In April 2021 Mika signed for Brooklyn Kings RLFC in the North American Rugby League (NARL). When the first season of the NARL was cancelled Mika became a free agent.

=== Keighley Cougars ===
Mika's signing for English side, Keighley Cougars, for the remainder of the 2021 season was announced on 14 July 2021.

=== Limoux Grizzlies ===
On 5 August 2022, it was announced that Mika had signed for Limoux Grizzlies for the 2022-23 season.

=== Nyngan Tigers ===
On 16 June 2023, Mika signed for the Nyngan Tigers.
