= Sonny Fai =

New Zealand rugby league footballer

Personal information
- Born: 20 March 1988 Auckland, New Zealand
- Died: 4 January 2009 (aged 20) Te Henga (Bethells Beach), Auckland, NZ

Playing information
- Height: 192 cm (6 ft 4 in)
- Weight: 109 kg (17 st 2 lb)
- Position: Second-row, Centre
Club
Years	Team	Pld	T	G	FG	P
2008	New Zealand Warriors	15	5	0	0	20

Sonny Fai (20 March 1988 – 4 January 2009) was a professional rugby league footballer who played for the New Zealand Warriors.

== Background ==
Fai was born in Auckland, New Zealand of Samoan descent. Fai often mentioned throughout his life how close he was with this family and how proud he was to originate from Samoa.

== Early years ==
Fai played only one senior game for his junior club, the Mangere East Hawks, before being promoted to the Counties Manukau Jetz in the Bartercard Cup. A Warriors development player since 2003, he later played for the Auckland Lions in the 2007 NSWRL Premier League and the Junior Warriors in the 2008 Toyota Cup. Fai made ten appearances in the Toyota Cup, scoring five tries. Fai attended De La Salle College, Mangere East.

== Playing career ==
Fai made his NRL debut on 23 March 2008 against the Parramatta Eels at Mount Smart Stadium, Auckland, New Zealand. Fai was named the Warriors 2007 Under-20 Player of the Year. A powerful back rower who impressed for the Auckland Lions when he debuted in the NSWRL Premier League in 2007, scoring 14 tries in 21 games. He was named in the New Zealand and Samoan training squads for the 2008 Rugby League World Cup.

== Representative career ==
Fai made representative teams from a young age, first making the New Zealand under-16s in 2003. Fai made the Junior Kiwis in 2004 and New Zealand 'A' in 2007.

== Disappearance ==
Fai went missing at around 7 pm on 4 January 2009, after being caught in a rip current after saving his brother and four cousins when they got into difficulty at Te Henga (Bethells Beach), Auckland. Despite extensive searches his body was never found, and on 13 August 2009 Chief coroner Neil McLean announced in the Auckland District Court that he drowned.

== Legacy ==
The New Zealand Warriors, in honour of Fai, kept his name on the playing roster for the 2009 season, in accordance with their team motto "Keeping the Faith". The Warriors wore black armbands for their opening NRL match of the 2009 season, as well as jerseys embroidered with Fai's signature and official team number in honour of him.

The Warriors dedicated their Round Five home match to Fai's memory. The match was played on 5 April 2009 and the Warriors were defeated by the South Sydney Rabbitohs, 22–16.
