= Tamaki Titans =

Defunct NZ rugby league club, based in Auckland, NZ

Club information
- Founded: 2006; 19 years ago as Tamaki Leopards
- Exited: 2008; 17 years ago

Former details
- Grounds: Mt Smart Stadium; Bert Henham Park; Ellerslie Domain
- Coach: Dean Clark
- Competition: Bartercard Cup

The Tamaki Titans (originally Tamaki Leopards) were a franchise in the now defunct New Zealand rugby league Bartercard Cup competition. They represented Eastern Auckland, this area was previously represented by the Otahuhu Ellerslie Leopards and the Eastern Tornadoes. Their coach, Dean Clark, was a former standoff who played for the Kiwis, New Zealand Māori, Hull KR & the Counties Manukau Heroes.

== Notable players ==
New Zealand Warriors associated with the club included: George Tuakura, Manu Vatuvei, Cooper Vuna, Ruben Wiki while other players included Elijah Taylor, Constantine Mika, Leeson Ah Mau and Paul Atkins.

== 2006 Results ==
Season 2006	Pld	W	D	L	PF	PA	PD	Pts
Finished Fourth	18	9	2	7	546	440	106	20

In 2006 they performed strongly, finishing fourth. They then went on to defeat the Counties Manukau Jetz in the first week of the playoffs and then pip the Waitakere Rangers 25–24 in an extra time thriller. They then lost in the preliminary final to the Canterbury Bulls.

Date	Match	Winner		Loser		Venue
28 August	Elimination Play-off	Tamaki Leopards	25	Counties Manukau Jetz	12	Mt Smart Stadium
4 September	Elimination Semifinal	Tamaki Leopards	25	Waitakere Rangers	24	North Harbour Stadium
11 September; TV Match	Preliminary Final	Canterbury Bulls	30	Tamaki Leopards	6	Mt Smart Stadium

== 2007 Results ==
The Titans finished fifth overall, just missing out on a playoff position.

Season	Pld	W	D	L	PF	PA	PD	Pts	Position (Teams)
2007	18	10	1	7	526	464	62	21	Fifth (10)

== Gallery ==
Previous Logo.
