= Kim Uasi =

Tonga international rugby league footballer

Kimi Uasi
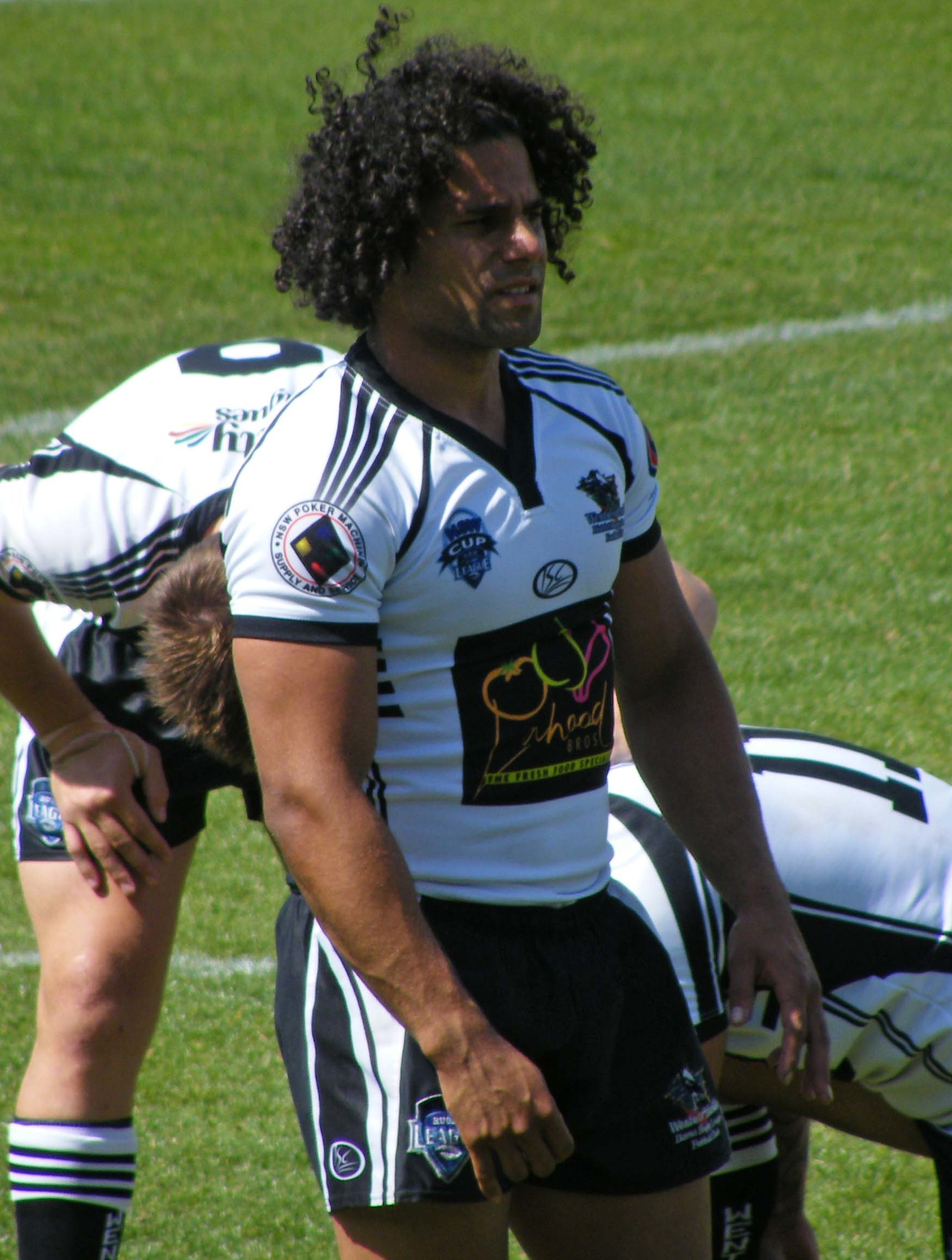

Personal information
- Full name: Eliakim Uasi
- Born: 21 February 1986 (age 39) Tonga

Playing information
- Position: Hooker
Representative
Years	Team	Pld	T	G	FG	P
2006–09	Tonga	9	0	0	0	0

Eliakim Uasi is a Tongan rugby league footballer who played for Tonga as a hooker at the 2008 World Cup.

== Background ==
Uasi was born in Tonga.

== Playing career ==
A Mangere East Hawks junior, Uasi has previously played for the Counties Manukau Jetz and Harbour League in the Bartercard Cup competition. He has also played for the Mt Albert Lions in the Auckland Rugby League competition and has represented the Auckland Vulcans in the NSW Cup.

Uasi has also appeared on several occasions for the Tonga national rugby league team, playing in the 2006 Federation Shield and 2008 Rugby League World Cup.

He played for the Souths Logan Magpies in the 2011 Queensland Cup. Since 2012 he has played for the Papakura Sea Eagles.

In 2015, while playing for the Papakura Sea Eagles, he played for both Auckland and Counties Manukau.
