= Aidan Kirk =

Australian rugby league footballer

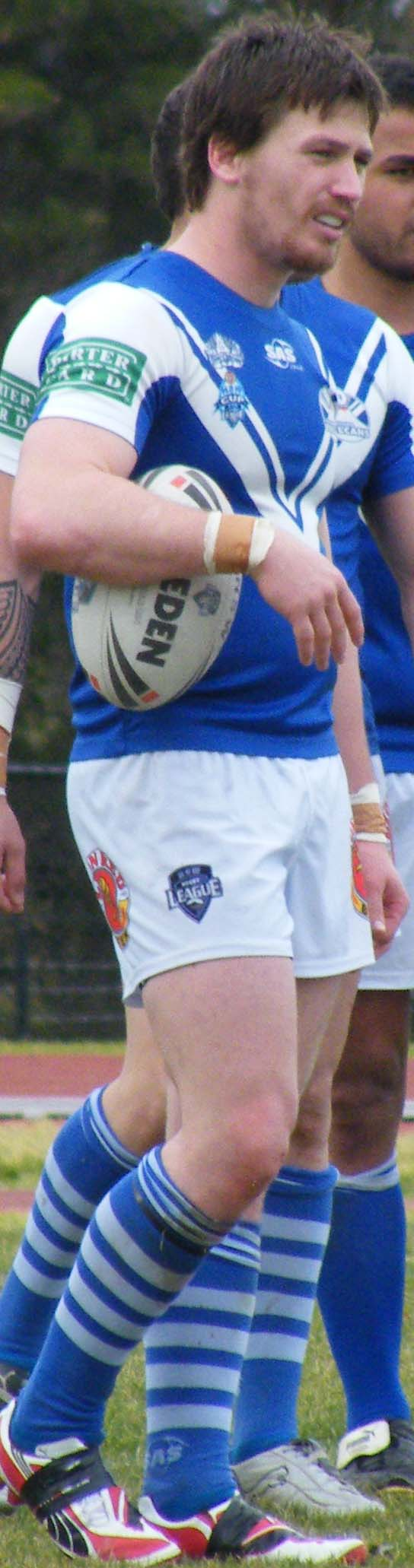
- Kirk playing for the Auckland Vulcans in 2008

Personal information
- Born: 16 March 1986 (age 40) Gosford, New South Wales, Australia
- Height: 181 cm (5 ft 11 in)
- Weight: 90 kg (14 st 2 lb)

Playing information
- Position: Fullback, Wing
Club
Years	Team	Pld	T	G	FG	P
2008–09	New Zealand Warriors	20	8	0	0	32
- Source: As of 3 November 2023

Aidan Kirk (born 16 March 1986) is a former professional rugby league footballer who last played in the National Rugby League for the New Zealand Warriors.

== Early years ==
Educated at St Edward's College in his hometown of Gosford on the Central Coast, Kirk played Jim Beam Cup for The Ourimbah Magies was picked up to play SG Ball and lower grades for the Newcastle Knights. He then joined the Roosters but did not break into first grade due to the dominance of Anthony Minichello. Instead Kirk played in the NSWRL Premier League under coach Ivan Cleary, and was eventually made captain of the side. In 2006 the Roosters signed a feeder arrangement with the Newtown Jets and Kirk played for the Jets in the Premier League. The Jets made the grand final however Kirk was stretchered off in the first half after tearing ligaments in his knee scoring a try.

== Warriors ==
In 2007 Kirk joined the New Zealand Warriors, reuniting with coach Cleary. However his pre-season was disrupted by his injury and he again played in the NSWRL Premier League, this time for the Auckland Lions. Kirk also made several appearances for the Counties Manukau Jetz in the Bartercard Cup.

In 2008 Kirk started round 1 at fullback for the New Zealand Warriors, replacing the injured Wade McKinnon. However he was immediately dropped and did not play first grade again until round eleven, this time filling in for the injured Manu Vatuvei on the wing. Kirk played another thirteen games for the club in 2008, mostly on the wing, and did enough to earn a new contract with the club, signing for 2009 with an option for 2010. He was released by the Warriors at the end of the 2009 season.

In 2011 he joined the Terrigal Sharks in the Central Coast Division Rugby League competition.
