= Waitakere Rangers =

Club information
- Founded: 2006
- Exited: 2008

Former details
- Ground(s): Trusts Stadium; Jack Colvin Park; Harold Moody Park
- Coach: Bernie Perenara

The Waitakere Rangers were a team in the now defunct Bartercard Cup Rugby league competition in New Zealand. They represented five clubs based in Waitakere City including the Glenora Bears who previously represented the City in the Bartercard Cup. The other four clubs were the Waitemata Seagulls, Te Atatu Roosters, New Lynn Stags and Bay Roskill Vikings. They were based at the Trusts Stadium although on occasion they played their matches at the grounds of their feeder clubs.

== Notable players ==
At various times their playing squad included former Warrior Cliff Beverley, former Melbourne Storm player Matt Rua and Awen Guttenbeil's brother Karl. Warriors assigned to the Rangers included Epalahame Lauaki and Sione Faumuina.

== History ==
=== 2006 results ===
Season 2006	Pld	W	D	L	PF	PA	PD	Pts
Finished Third	18	12	0	6	608	435	173	24

In 2006 the Rangers secured a playoff position and eventually finished third. The Rangers lost a close play-off match in Christchurch to the Canterbury Bulls 26-20 and then lost to the Tamaki Leopards 25–24 in extra time the following weekend to be elimiminated from the play-offs.

2006 Finals Series	Winner		Loser
Preliminary Semifinal	Canterbury Bulls	26	Waitakere Rangers	20
Elimination Semifinal	Tamaki Leopards	25	Waitakere Rangers	24

=== 2007 results ===
After finishing fourth in the regular season, The Rangers were defeated by the Canterbury Bulls 35–18 in the first week of the playoffs to be eliminated from the competition.

Season 2007	Pld	W	D	L	PF	PA	PD	Pts	Playoffs
Fourth	18	11	1	6	638	430	208	23	Lost Elimination Semifinal

== See also ==
- Auckland Rugby League
- Bartercard Cup
- New Zealand Rugby League
- New Zealand Warriors
- Rugby league in New Zealand
- Super City Rangers
