= 2008 New Zealand rugby league season =

Seasons
- 2007 2009

The 2008 New Zealand rugby league season was the 101st season of rugby league that had been played in New Zealand. The main feature of the year was the inaugural season of the Bartercard Premiership competition that was run by the New Zealand Rugby League. Auckland won the title by defeating the Canterbury Bulls 38–18 in the Grand Final.

== International competitions ==
The New Zealand national rugby league team played two matches in New Zealand in 2008 as build up to the World Cup. As the All Golds they played a match against the New Zealand Māori in New Plymouth. They also defeated Tonga in a test match in Auckland. The Kiwis went on to win the World Cup for the first time, defeating Australia 34 - 20 in the Final. Coached by Stephen Kearney the World Cup squad was captain Nathan Cayless, Adam Blair, Greg Eastwood, David Fa'alogo, Nathan Fien, Dene Halatau, Bronson Harrison, Lance Hohaia, Krisnan Inu, David Kidwell, Thomas Leuluai, Issac Luke, Simon Mannering, Sika Manu, Benji Marshall, Steve Matai, Jason Nightingale, Sam Perrett, Sam Rapira, Jerome Ropati, Setaimata Sa, Jeremy Smith, Evarn Tuimavave and Manu Vatuvei.

12 October 2008

All Golds (New Zealand)	44 – 10	Māori
Try: Vatuvei (2); Hohaia (2); Sa; Inu; Perrett; Wiki; Goal: Luke (3); Inu (2); Swann	(report)	Try: Kenny-Dowall; Nightingale; Goal: Locke

Yarrow Stadium, New Plymouth
Referee: Leon Williamson (New Zealand)

18 October 2008

New Zealand	56 – 8	Tonga
Try: Ropati (3); Nightingale (2); Marshall (2); Sa; Leuluai; Mannering; Goal: Inu (6); Matai (2)	(report)	Try: Vuna; Leo-Latu

Mt Smart Stadium, Auckland
Referee: Jason Robinson (Australia)

Earlier in the year New Zealand had lost 12-28 to Australia. Roy Asotasi, Iosia Soliola, Sonny Bill Williams, Frank Pritchard and Brent Webb played in this match but were not included in the World Cup squad.

As part of the Festival of World Cups New Zealand sent teams to the University Rugby League World Cup, International Police Rugby League World Cup, Women's Rugby League World Cup and Defence Forces World Cup. New Zealand, coached by Frank Endacott, won the Women's World Cup while the New Zealand Police lost the final of the Police World Cup.

The New Zealand Māori side were coached by Luke Goodwin with Richie Blackmore and Chris Anderson providing assistance. The squad to face the All Golds was Kevin Locke, Jordan Rapana, Shaun Kenny-Dowall, Wairangi Koopu, Jason Nightingale, Arana Taumata, Rangi Chase, Sam McKendry, Ben Ellis, Weller Hauraki, Bronson Harrison, Anthony Cherrington, Lee Te Maari, Jared Kahu, Joseph Cahill, Chance Bunce, James Tamou and Kevin Proctor. Bronx Goodwin, Chase Stanley, Craig Smith, Charlie Herekotukutuku and Karl Johnson were added to the team for the World Cup opening match against the Indigenous Dreamtime Team.

== National competitions ==
=== Rugby League Cup ===
The New Zealand Rugby League ruled that the Rugby League Cup would be defended in all Bartercard Premiership matches, home and away. The Cup changed hands in the Final, when Auckland defeated the holders, Canterbury, 38–18.

=== Bartercard Premiership ===
Bartercard Premiership 2008
- League: Bartercard Premiership
- Sport: Rugby league
- Teams: 6
- TV partner: Māori Television
- Major Premiership: Auckland
- Minor Premiership: Canterbury

NZRL seasons
- ← 2007 2009 →

The 2008 season was the inaugural Bartercard Premiership. It replaced the Bartercard Cup as the top division of rugby league in New Zealand.

==== Teams ====
Canterbury were co-coached by Brent Stuart and Dave Perkins with Phil Prescott as the director of coaching. Mike Dorreen and Logan Edwards were the co-coached of the age group side.

Auckland were coached by Sam Panapa and included Pita Godinet, Jeremiah Pai and Wayne McDade.

Bay of Plenty were coached by Graham Lowe.

==== Season standings ====
Province	Pl	W	D	L	For	Ag	P/D	Pts
Canterbury	5	5	0	0	242	96	146	10
Auckland	5	3	1	1	204	92	112	7
Waikato	5	3	0	2	110	138	-28	6
Wellington	5	2	1	2	146	138	8	5
Bay of Plenty	5	1	0	4	114	186	-72	2
Taranaki	5	0	0	5	96	262	-166	0

==== Fixtures and results ====
===== Round 1 =====
Home	Score	Away	Match Information
Home	Score	Away	Date	Venue
Auckland	70-0	Bay of Plenty	24 August 2008	Mount Smart Stadium, Auckland
Wellington	18-38	Canterbury	24 August 2008	Porirua Park, Porirua
Taranaki	22-24	Waikato	24 August 2008	Yarrow Stadium, New Plymouth

===== Round 2 =====
Home	Score	Away	Match Information
Home	Score	Away	Date	Venue
Canterbury	94-10	Taranaki	30 August 2008	Rugby League Park, Christchurch
Waikato	30-24	Bay of Plenty	31 August 2008	Davies Park, Huntly
Wellington	30-30	Auckland	31 August 2008	Porirua Park, Porirua

===== Round 3 =====
Home	Score	Away	Match Information
Home	Score	Away	Date	Venue
Canterbury	34 - 22	Bay of Plenty	6 September 2008	Rugby League Park, Christchurch
Wellington	56 - 20	Taranaki	7 September 2008	Porirua Park, Porirua
Waikato	10 - 34	Auckland	8 September 2008	Resthills Park, Hamilton

===== Round 4 =====
Home	Score	Away	Match Information
Home	Score	Away	Date	Venue
Waikato	30 - 18	Wellington	13 September 2008	Davies Park, Huntly
Bay of Plenty	48 - 28	Taranaki	13 September 2008	Puketawhero Park, Rotorua
Canterbury	36 - 30	Auckland	14 September 2008	Rugby League Park, Christchurch

===== Round 5 =====
Home	Score	Away	Match Information
Home	Score	Away	Date	Venue
Bay of Plenty	20 - 24	Wellington	20 September 2008	Puketawhero Park, Rotorua
Taranaki	16 - 40	Auckland	20 September 2008	Yarrow Stadium, New Plymouth
Canterbury	40 - 16	Waikato	21 September 2008	Rugby League Park, Christchurch

===== Grand final =====
Home	Score	Away	Match Information
Home	Score	Away	Date	Venue
Canterbury	18 - 38	Auckland	28 September 2008	Mount Smart Stadium, Auckland

Tries (Auckland)	3: Sione Tongia
	1: Savinata Hafoka, Sunita Laiseni, Raymond Ioane, Wayne McDade, and Pita Godinet
Tries (Canterbury)	2: Nathan Sherlock
	1: Chris Bamford
Goals (Auckland)	2: Jeremiah Pai
	1: William Heta
Goals (Canterbury)	3: Scott Hurrell
Broadcast	Māori Television

== Australian competitions ==
The New Zealand Warriors competed in the National Rugby League competition. They finished 8th out of 16 teams before winning in the Qualifying and Semi finals before losing to eventual premiers Manly.

The Junior Warriors finished third in the Toyota Cup, making the finals before losing to the Brisbane Broncos in a Preliminary Final.

The Auckland Vulcans also competed in the NSW Cup.

== Club competitions ==
=== Auckland ===
The Mt Albert Lions won the Fox Memorial, defeating Otahuhu 24–22 in the final. The Otahuhu Leopards won the Rukutai Shield (minor premiership) while Richmond won the Stormont Shield. Richmond also won the Sharman Cup (second division) while the New Lynn Stags won the Pheland Shield (third division).

Mt Albert were coached by Brent Gemmell and included Steve Buckingham, Sala Fa'alogo, Paul and David Fisiiahi, Anthony Swann and Matthew Sturm.

=== Wellington ===
The Porirua Vikings won the Wellington Rugby League title.

=== Canterbury ===
Linwood won the Canterbury Rugby League title.

=== Other Competitions ===
The Taniwharau Rugby League Club defeated Hamilton City Tigers to win the Waikato Rugby League competition.

Taniwharau defeated Otumotai to win the WaiCoa Bay championship.

Pacific won the Baywide premier competition. This was a joint competition run by the Coastline and Bay of Plenty Rugby League's.

== See also ==
- 2008 in rugby league
