= 2009 New Zealand rugby league season =

Seasons
- 2008 2010

The 2009 New Zealand rugby league season was the 102nd season of rugby league that had been played in New Zealand. The main feature of the year was the second season of the Bartercard Premiership competition that was run by the New Zealand Rugby League. The Canterbury Bulls won the minor premiership and then the premiership by defeating Auckland 26–20 in the Grand Final.

== International competitions ==
The New Zealand national rugby league team defeated Tonga in Rotorua before heading to Europe to compete in the Four Nations where they finished third. By defeating Tonga the Kiwis retained the Peter Leitch QSM Challenge Trophy. Coached by Stephen Kearney, the Four Nations squad included; Adam Blair, Greg Eastwood, Nathan Fien, Kieran Foran, Bryson Goodwin, Bronson Harrison, Lance Hohaia, Thomas Leuluai, Jeff Lima, Issac Luke, captain Benji Marshall, Steve Matai, Ben Matulino, Fuifui Moimoi, Frank-Paul Nu'uausala, Sam Perrett, Frank Pritchard, Junior Sau, Iosia Soliola, Jared Waerea-Hargreaves, Kevin Locke and Eddy Pettybourne.

Earlier in the year New Zealand lost 10-38 to Australia. Manu Vatuvei, Roy Asotasi, Dene Halatau, David Fa'alogo, Simon Mannering, Jason Nightingale, Sika Manu and Jerome Ropati played in this match but did not tour at the end of the year.

=== Bartercard Premiership Selection ===
A Bartercard Premiership Selection defeated a Samoan Residents side 62-14 on 10 October 2009. Canterbury coach Brent Stuart coached the Bartercard selection. Ruben Wiki came out of retirement to play in the match and all the proceeds were donated to the Samoan tsunami relief fund. The match was broadcast on Māori Television.

Bartercard Premiership Selection: Jonny Aranga (Cant), 2-Junior Salevao (Cant), 3-Craig Smith (Cant), 4-Gunther Schaumkel (Auck), 5-James Blackwell (Auck), 6-William Heta (Auck), 7-Kelvin Wright (Auck), 8-Vince Whare (Auck), 9-Nathan Sherlock (Cant), 10-Fred Turuwhenua (Auck), 11-Chris Bamford (Cant), 12-Sialli Tufeao (Auck), 13-Jonny Limmer (Cant). Interchange: 14-Dylan Davis (Auck), 15-Patrick Matulino (Auck), 16-Sione Tongia (Auck), 17-Suaia Matagi (Auck), 18-Darren Kingi (Waikato). Coach: Brent Stuart.

== National competitions ==
=== Rugby League Cup ===
Canterbury defeated Auckland on 23 August to win the Rugby League Cup. As in 2008 the New Zealand Rugby League ruled that the Rugby League Cup would be defended in all Bartercard Premiership matches, home and away.

=== Bartercard Premiership ===
Bartercard Premiership 2009
- League: Bartercard Premiership
- Sport: Rugby league
- Teams: 6
- TV partner: SKY Network Television
- Major Premiership: Canterbury
- Minor Premiership: Canterbury

NZRL seasons
- ← 2008

The 2009 season was the second and final Bartercard Premiership. Auckland were the defending champions. The same six provinces as in 2008 again took part in the competition. The Canterbury Bulls won the minor premiership and defeated Auckland 26–20 in the final.

Auckland included Sala Fa'alogo.

==== Television ====
The semi-finals and grand final of the Bartercard Premiership were shown live on SKY Network Television and also delayed on free to air.

==== Season standings ====
| Province | Pl | W | D | L | For | Ag | P/D | Pts |
|---|---|---|---|---|---|---|---|---|
| Canterbury | 5 | 5 | 0 | 0 | 210 | 60 | 150 | 10 |
| Auckland | 5 | 4 | 0 | 1 | 202 | 96 | 106 | 8 |
| Waikato | 5 | 3 | 0 | 2 | 130 | 108 | 22 | 6 |
| Wellington | 5 | 2 | 0 | 3 | 142 | 120 | 22 | 4 |
| Taranaki | 5 | 1 | 0 | 4 | 86 | 212 | -126 | 2 |
| Bay of Plenty | 5 | 0 | 0 | 5 | 70 | 254 | -184 | 0 |

==== Warm Up Matches ====
In a warm up match Canterbury lost to the West Coast 20-14. This was reportedly the first time since 1989 that the West Coast had defeated Canterbury.

==== Fixtures and results ====
===== Round 1 =====
| Home | Score | Away | Match Information |
| Home | Score | Away | Date | Venue |
|---|---|---|---|---|
| Waikato | 32-22 | Wellington | 22 August 2009 | Paterson Park, Ngaruawahia |
| Taranaki | 40-8 | Bay of Plenty | 23 August 2009 | Yarrow Stadium, New Plymouth |
| Canterbury | 32-30 | Auckland | 23 August 2009 | Rugby League Park, Christchurch |

===== Round 2 =====
| Home | Score | Away | Match Information |
| Home | Score | Away | Date | Venue |
|---|---|---|---|---|
| Waikato | 22-30 | Auckland | 30 August 2009 | Davies Park, Huntly |
| Wellington | 46-12 | Taranaki | 9 September 2009 | Porirua Park, Porirua |
| Bay of Plenty | 16-66 | Canterbury | 18 September 2009 | Rotorua International Stadium, Rotorua |

Canterbury vs. Bay of Plenty and Wellington vs. Taranaki matches were originally unable to take place as scheduled due to air travel issues. They were rescheduled to be mid-week games.

===== Round 3 =====
| Home | Score | Away | Match Information |
| Home | Score | Away | Date | Venue |
|---|---|---|---|---|
| Bay of Plenty | 12-52 | Auckland | 5 September 2008 | Puketawhero Park, Rotorua |
| Taranaki | 14-36 | Waikato | 5 September 2009 | Yarrow Stadium, New Plymouth |
| Canterbury | 32-0 | Wellington | 6 September 2009 | Rugby League Park, Christchurch |

===== Round 4 =====
| Home | Score | Away | Match Information |
| Home | Score | Away | Date | Venue |
|---|---|---|---|---|
| Bay of Plenty | 10-36 | Waikato | 12 September 2009 | Puketawhero Park, Rotorua |
| Taranaki | 10-48 | Canterbury | 13 September 2009 | Yarrow Stadium, New Plymouth |
| Wellington | 14-16 | Auckland | 13 September 2009 | Porirua Park, Porirua |

===== Round 5 =====
| Home | Score | Away | Match Information |
| Home | Score | Away | Date | Venue |
|---|---|---|---|---|
| Wellington | 60-24 | Bay of Plenty | 19 September 2009 | Porirua Park, Porirua |
| Auckland | 74-16 | Taranaki | 20 September 2008 | Mt Smart Stadium Number 2, Auckland |
| Waikato | 4-32 | Canterbury | 20 September 2008 | Davies Park, Huntly |

===== Semi finals =====
| Home | Score | Away | Match Information |
| Home | Score | Away | Date | Venue |
|---|---|---|---|---|
| Auckland | 60-4 | Waikato | 26 September 2009 | Mt Smart Stadium, Auckland |
| Canterbury | 20-17 | Wellington | 27 September 2009 | Rugby League Park, Christchurch |

===== Grand final =====
| Home | Score | Away | Match Information |
| Home | Score | Away | Date | Venue |
|---|---|---|---|---|
| Canterbury | 26-20 | Auckland | 4 October 2009 | Rugby League Park, Christchurch |

| Tries (Canterbury) | 2: Jonny Aranga |
| | 1: Junior Salevao, Craig Smith, Jermahl Carroll |
| Tries (Auckland) | 1: William Heta, James Blackwell, Henry Heta, Sione Taka |
| Goals (Canterbury) | 3: Simon Mounga |
| Goals (Auckland) | 1: Cody Walker, William Heta |
| Referee | Leon Williamson |
| Broadcast | SKY Network Television |

==== Junior Grades ====
Each of the Bartercard Premiership matches was preceded by a National Junior Competition Under 16 and Under 18 game. These two competitions ran in parallel with the senior competition. Auckland won the Under-16s final 11-10 over Taranaki while the Auckland under 18s defeated Wellington 34-10 to win that competition. Both finals were held in Cornwall Park, Auckland.

== Australian competitions ==
The New Zealand Warriors competed in the National Rugby League competition. They finished 14th out of 16 teams and failed to make the playoffs.

The Junior Warriors finished seventh before losing their Qualifying Final match.

The Auckland Vulcans competed in the NSW Cup and finished 11th out of eleven teams.

== Club competitions ==
=== Auckland ===
The Mt Albert Lions defeated the Papakura Sea Eagles 32–10 in the Grand Final to win the Fox Memorial. As minor premiers, the Otahuhu Leopards were awarded the Rukutai Shield. Papakura were coached by Dean Clark and included Toshio Laiseni.

Howick won the Sharman Cup while the Manukau Magpies won the Phelan Shield.

=== Wellington ===
The Porirua Vikings won the Wellington Rugby League title.

=== Canterbury ===
Hornby won the Canterbury Rugby League title.

Shane Endacott was the Celebration Lions' assistant coach while Phil Prescott coached Halswell.

The Timaru Warriors rejoined the CRL competition, after being in recess for four years.

=== Other Competitions ===
The Taniwharau Rugby League Club won the Waikato Rugby League competition.

Tokoroa's Pacific won the Bay of Plenty Rugby League competition while Otumoetai won the combined Coastline-Gisborne premiership, defeating the Paikea Whalers 34–8. The Hawke's Bay's Flaxmere Falcons competed in the Bay of Plenty competition. Matthew Spence was the Turangi Dambusters' player-coach.

The Paikea Whalers won the Gisborne Tairawhiti Rugby League competition, defeating the Kaiti Devils 76–14 in the grand final.

Blair Sims was named the West Coast Rugby League's player of the season.

== See also ==
- 2009 in rugby league
