= Andy Berryman =

NZ & NZ Māori international rugby league footballer and coach

Personal information
- Full name: Andrew Nuki Berryman
- Born: 6 November 1931; Waikato, New Zealand
- Died: 25 February 1984 (aged 52); Hamilton, New Zealand

Playing information
- Position: Fullback, Wing, Centre
Club
Years	Team	Pld	T	G	FG	P
	Otahuhu
	Taniwharau
	Total	0	0	0	0	0
Representative
Years	Team	Pld	T	G	FG	P
1949–??	South Auckland
1949–??	New Zealand Māori
1951–52	New Zealand	0	0	0	0	0

Coaching information
Representative
Years	Team	Gms	W	D	L	W%
1983	New Zealand Māori

Andrew Nuki Berryman was a New Zealand rugby league player who represented New Zealand.

== Playing career ==
Originally an Otahuhu junior, Berryman moved to Huntly and joined Taniwharau. He once scored ten tries for Taniwharau in a single game. He was first selected for South Auckland when aged 18.

Berryman made his debut for the New Zealand Māori in 1949 against the touring Australian side. Two years later he was selected for the New Zealand national rugby league team to tour Great Britain and France. He played in 12 games on the tour, but no test matches.

He toured Australia in 1956 with the New Zealand Māori side and played against touring Great Britain and French sides.

In 1961 he scored seven tries for Waikato in a match against the Bay of Plenty.

During his playing career he was described as the "best side stepper in the world".

== Coaching career ==
After retiring, Berryman moved into coaching. He was the New Zealand Māori assistant coach during the 1975 Pacific Cup.

He coached New Zealand Māori on their 1983 tour of the United Kingdom.

Soon after the tour, in February 1984, Berryman died aged 53.

== Legacy ==
In 2015, he was named at fullback in Taniwharau's team of their first 70 years.

All Black Norm Berryman was his brother's grandson.
