= 2008 in rugby league =

2008 was celebrated in Australia as the centenary of rugby league football, as in Australia it was in 1908 that the code broke away from rugby. The highlight of the year was the World Cup, which was held in Australia in October and November 2008.

== January ==
- 26 January – Jacksonville, USA: The Leeds Rhinos defeat the South Sydney Rabbitohs 26–24 in a pre-season trial match at the University of North Florida before over 12,000.

== February ==
- 8 February – Warrington, England: The 2008 Super League XIII season starts with the Warrington Wolves defeating Hull F.C. 32–20 at Halliwell Jones Stadium before 14,827.
- 29 February – Leeds, England: The 2008 World Club Challenge is won by the Leeds Rhinos who defeat the Melbourne Storm 11 – 4 at Elland Road before 33,204.

== March ==
- 14 March – Sydney, Australia: The National Rugby League's 2008 Telstra Premiership kicks off at ANZ Stadium with the Sydney Roosters defeating the South Sydney Rabbitohs 34–20 before 29,386.

== April ==
- 17 April – Sydney, Australia: The Australian rugby league team of the century is announced.

== May ==
- 2 May – The 75th annual City vs Country Origin match was played at WIN Stadium, Wollongong before a crowd of 11,365. The game was refereed by Jared Maxwell and kicked off at 8:00pm and finished in an unexpected draw of 22-all. The first known draw in City-Country representative history since 1933, which then was 17 all.
- 9 May – The 2008 Centenary ANZAC Test took place on Friday 9 May at Sydney Cricket Ground, commemorating the first ever trans-Tasman test match which was played precisely one hundred years earlier to the day. Prior to the match the Australian national anthem was performed by singer and songwriter Julia Messenger, great granddaughter of Dally Messenger who played in the 1908 game. There was some controversy regarding the release of two Super League players, Leeds Rhinos' Brent Webb and Wigan Warriors' Thomas Leuluai as the Test clashed with the 5th round of the 2008 Challenge Cup.

8:00pm AEST

Australia	28–12	New Zealand
Try: Gasnier 6', 13'; Gallen 17'; C. Smith 22'; Folau 64'; Goal: Thurston (4)		Try: Soliola 42'; Perrett 79'; Goal: J. Smith; Luke

Sydney Cricket Ground
Attendance: 34,571
Player of the Match: Mark Gasnier (Australia)
Simon Mannering (New Zealand)

Australia won their 7th straight match over New Zealand with a 28–12 win in the 9th ANZAC Test. The Kangaroos, wearing the original sky blue and maroon hooped jersey from the days before the green & gold, got out to a 22–0 lead (including a remarkably acrobatic try involving Greg Inglis and Mark Gasnier) in only 23 minutes into the match and it remained that scoreline going into the break. New Zealand scored first in the second half only two minutes in bringing it back to 22–6. However Australia put the game beyond doubt when they scored in the 64th minute regaining their margin of 22 points with the New Zealand side scoring a late consolation try finalising the score 28–12.

- 17 May – Béziers, France: Elite One Championship V culminates in Lézignan Sangliers' 26 – 16 win against Pia Donkeys in the final at Stade de la Méditerranée before 8,233.
- 21 May – Game one of the 2008 State of Origin series was played at Sydney's ANZ Stadium before a crowd of 67,620. The game kicked off at 8:00pm and was refereed by Tony Archer. New South Wales defeated Queensland 18 – 10.

== June ==
11 June 2008

Queensland	30–0	New South Wales
Johnathan Thurston (14 – 7g); Darius Boyd (8 – 2t); Ben Hannant (4 – 1t); Israel Folau (4 – 1t)

Suncorp Stadium, Brisbane
Attendance: 52,476
Referee: Tony Archer
Player of the Match: Greg Inglis

27 June 2008

France	8–56	England
Tries: Wynne 8'; Goals: Bosc (2/2)	Report	Tries: Pryce 14'; Gleeson (3) 19', 57', 61'; Fa'asavalu 35'; Fox 49'; Senior 52'; Wilkin 67'; McGuire 70'; Wellens 74'; Goals: Sinfield (5/6); Burrow (3/4)

Stade Ernest Wallon, Toulouse
Attendance: 8,326
Referee: Jason Robinson
Player of the Match: Leon Pryce

== July ==
- 2 July – Sydney, Australia: The 2008 State of Origin is won by Queensland in the third and deciding match of the series against New South Wales at ANZ Stadium before 78,751.
- 26 July – Sydney, Australia: New Zealand international, Sonny Bill Williams departed Australia from Sydney Airport, leaving the NRL for an immediate switch to French rugby union club Toulon, walking out 18 months into a 5-year contract with the Bulldogs club.

== August ==
- 30 August – London, England: The 2008 Challenge Cup culminates in St. Helens' 28 – 16 win against Hull F.C. in the final at Wembley Stadium before 82,821.

== September ==
- 9 September – Sydney, Australia: The 2008 Dally M Awards are held with Matt Orford being named NRL player of the season.
- 13 September – Ipswich, Australia: The 2008 Queensland Cup culminates in the Ipswich Jets' 24 – 18 win against the Souths Logan Magpies in the grand final.
- 28 September – Auckland, New Zealand: The 2008 Bartercard Premiership culminates in the Canterbury's 38 – 10 win against Auckland in the grand final.

== October ==
- 4 October – Manchester, England: Super League XIII culminates in the Leeds Rhinos' 24–16 win against St. Helens in the final at Old Trafford before 68,810.
- 5 October – Sydney, Australia: The 2008 NRL season culminates in the Manly-Warringah Sea Eagles' record-breaking 40 – 0 win against the Melbourne Storm in the grand final at ANZ Stadium before 80,388.
- 10 October – Doncaster, England: In the weeks before the World Cup began nearly half of the teams played warm up matches to prepare themselves for the tournament and to help select their squads.

England	74 – 0	Wales
Try: Briscoe (2); Sykes (2); Gleeson (2); Myler (2); Purdham; Calderwood; Clubb; Hock; McCarthy-Scarsbrook; Fox; Goal: Purdham (9)	(Report)

Keepmoat Stadium, Doncaster
Attendance: 11,263
Referee: Steve Ganson (England)
Player of the Match: Rob Purdham

- 12 October – New Plymouth, New Zealand: In the weeks before the World Cup began nearly half of the teams played warm up matches to prepare themselves for the tournament and to help select their squads.

All Golds (New Zealand)	44 – 10	Māori
Try: Vatuvei (2); Hohaia (2); Sa; Inu; Perrett; Wiki; Goal: Luke (3); Inu (2); Swann	(report)	Try: Kenny-Dowall; Nightingale; Goal: Locke

Yarrow Stadium, New Plymouth
Referee: Leon Williamson (New Zealand)

- 12 October – Port Moresby, Papua New Guinea: In the weeks before the World Cup began nearly half of the teams played warm up matches to prepare themselves for the tournament and to help select their squads.

12 October 2008

PNG Residents (Papua New Guinea)	12 – 22	(Papua New Guinea) PNG Internationals
Try: Marabe; Riyong; Goal: J. Joe; John	(report)	Try: Keppa; S. Joe; Bond; Goal: Wilshere (3)

Lloyd Robson Oval, Port Moresby
Attendance: 10,000+
Referee: Shayne Hayne (Australia)
Player of the Match: Neville Costigan

- 18 October – Auckland, New Zealand: In the weeks before the World Cup began nearly half of the teams played warm up matches to prepare themselves for the tournament and to help select their squads.

New Zealand	56 – 8	Tonga
Try: Ropati (3); Nightingale (2); Marshall (2); Sa; Leuluai; Mannering; Goal: Inu (6); Matai (2)	(report)	Try: Vuna; Leo-Latu

Mt Smart Stadium, Auckland
Referee: Jason Robinson (Australia)

- 24 October – Townsville, Australia: The 2008 Rugby League World Cup tournament commences with a match between England and Papua New Guinea at the Dairy Farmers Stadium.

== November ==
- 6th – Sydney, Australia: The 10th annual Tom Brock Lecture, entitled From a Federation Game to a League of Nations is delivered by Lex Marinos, OAM.
- 19th – Sydney, Australia: The 2008 Golden Boot award for best international player is given by Australia's Billy Slater.
- 22nd – Brisbane, Australia: The 2008 World Cup tournament culminates in New Zealand's 34 – 20 win against Australia in the final at Suncorp Stadium before 50,599.

== December ==
- 11th - Sydney, Australia: The National Rugby League announces that the number of on-field referees in premiership matches would increase from one to two from the 2009 season.

== See also ==
- 2008 in sports
