= Diorama Arts Cooperative =

London arts group

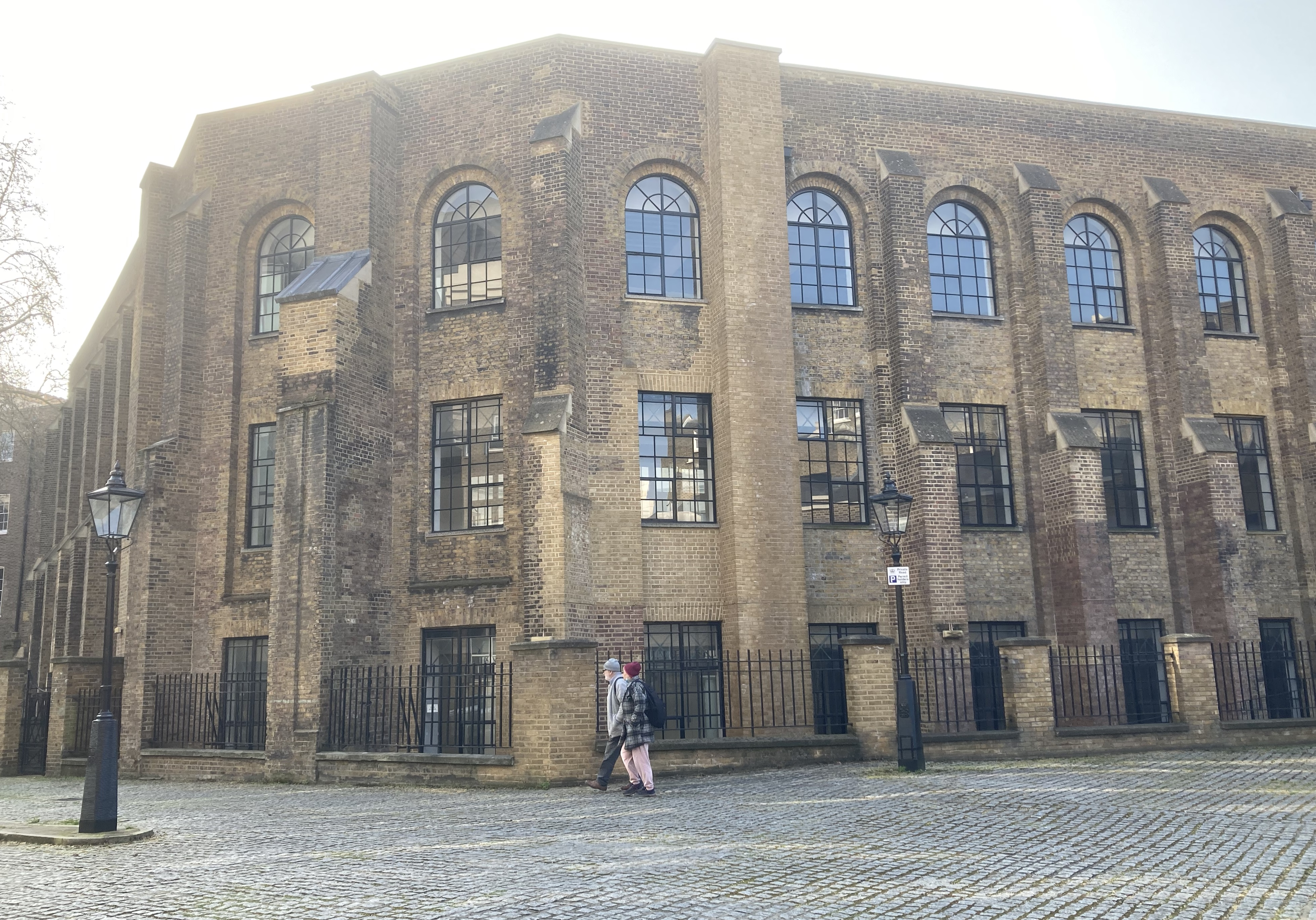
The Diorama on Peto Place

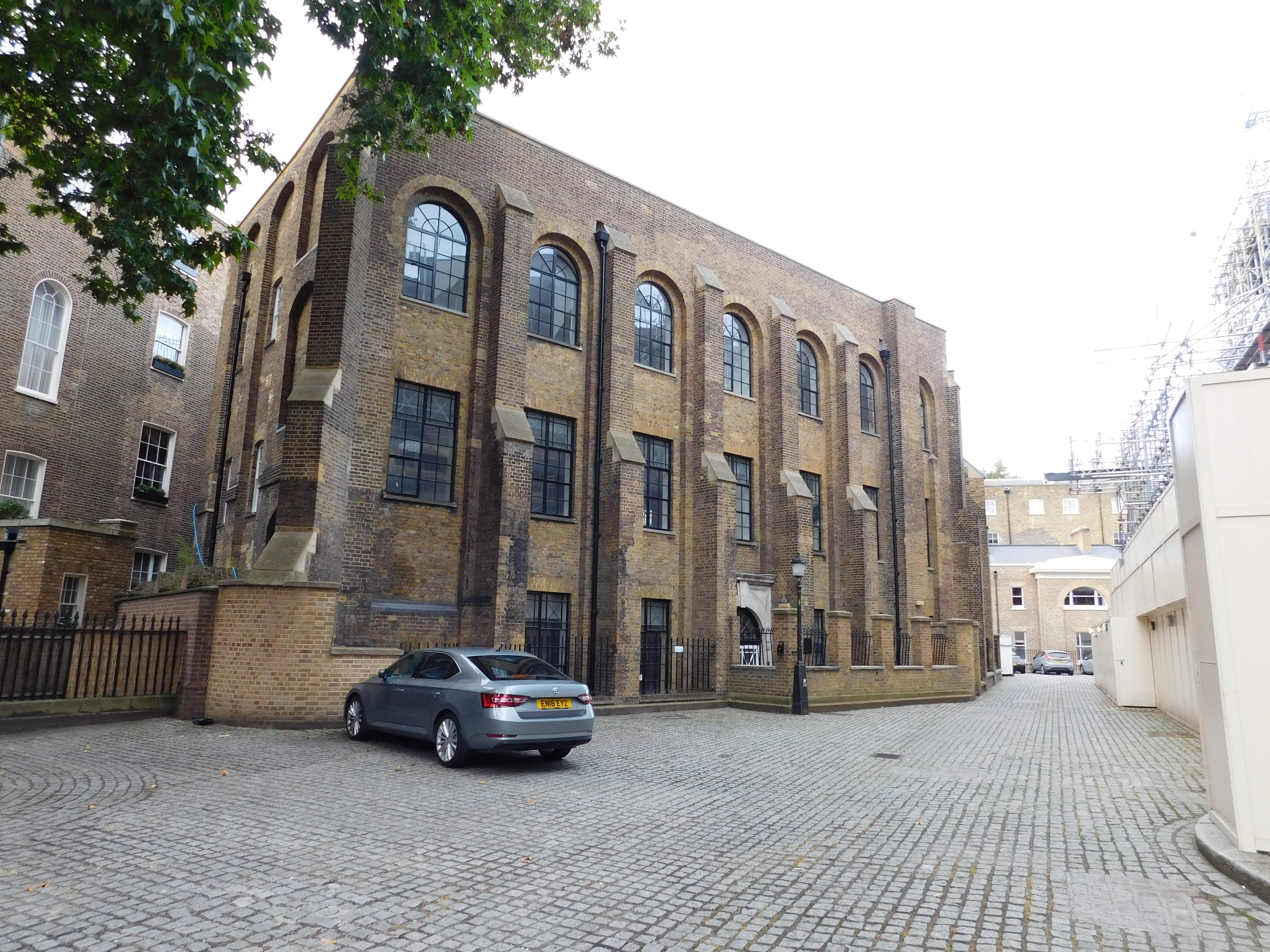
Rear of 18 Park Square East (formerly the Diorama) in Peto Street, London

Diorama Arts Cooperative (DAC) was a mixture of actors, artists, dancers, designers, journalists, musicians and therapists who used the Diorama theatre in Regent's Park (London) between 1976 and 1992. In September 1981, DAC was incorporated as the charity Diorama Arts Centre.

According to the Theatres Trust, "In the 1970s, the arts collective created a small theatre within a lively arts centre, widely known as a place for arts, craft, theatre, concerts and more." The book The Diorama Arts Project said, "Diorama arts is a community arts group particularly concerned with the handicapped and under-privileged, which plans to convert the Regents Park Diorama building for use as its headquarters."

At Christmas 1992, Diorama Arts Centre left the building; its landlords, the Crown Estate Commissioners and Camden Council relocated the organisation to a new development nearby in Osnaburgh Street. Old Diorama Arts Centre (ODAC), now at the Regent's Place campus, continues the charity.

== Timeline ==
=== Building ===
The building taken over by the DAC c. 1976 was originally used by Louis Daguerre, a pioneer of photography. Designed by John Arrowsmith and built by Morgan & Pugin, the Diorama exhibited paintings by Daguerre and Bouton. The brick building was polygonal in shape, and its frontage is visible in a long row of Regency-era buildings designed by John Nash. The popular, short-lived form of visual entertainment consisted of painted scenes dramatised with lighting and other effects. Artist John Constable, who attended the first showing in September 1823, wrote to his friend Archdeacon Fisher: "It is in part a transparency, the spectator is in a dark chamber, and it is very pleasing and has great illusion..."

Daguerre's diorama closed in 1848 due to falling income, and by 1854 had been converted into a Baptist chapel. The chapel closed in 1922 and was taken over by the Red Cross, who joined with Middlesex Hospital. During the 1920s, Thomas Pole designed the Octagon in the Diorama; a rheumatism-treatment hydrotherapy pool was installed, and the hospital left the building by 1964. In 1965, Bedford College moved in their Geography, Zoology and Social Research Departments; the college left c. 1974. The Octagon's internal shape was used by the DAC, and a resident cafe was later named after it.

=== 1976 to 1981 ===
By c.1976, an arts cooperative had taken over the Diorama. According to a New Statesman article, "The Crown granted annual leases to some dyslexia therapists who used music and drama; gradually the building filled with artists and therapy groups who paid small rents (to cover the cost of the upkeep) to the collective which became Diorama Arts." Poet and drama therapist Larry Butler remembered his involvement: "Before coming to Glasgow in 1981, I was the founder and warden of the Diorama Arts Co-operative, director of PlaySpace Trust and Matchbox Theatre."

Former Matchbox Theatre member Hazel Carey wrote in her book, Ubuntu: my life in other people,

"Around the end of the 1970s and into the '80s, people who were culturally and creatively progressive were springing up with ideas and propositions that were helping to produce an alternative lifestyle. Larry Butler was one of those people ... We had our base in the Diorama, the first cinematic house in London, in Regent's Park, where Larry worked as the caretaker. He was a good carer, and a pioneer in the field of communication, where his leadership was streaked with the marks of a wild genius."

The website My Camden said, "In the late seventies artists and performers took up residence in the Diorama building by Regent's Park, developing a co-operative approach to the arts, education, therapy, and disability arts."

=== 1981 to 1992 ===
After a Crown Estate Commissioners (CEC) request, Diorama Arts Centre was incorporated as a charity and company on 15 September 1981; in 1982, a rental agreement was formalised. Until then, it had a peppercorn rent of about £25 per year.

In 1983, the group faced eviction; Greycoats Estates, acting for the CEC, sought to redevelop the Diorama into offices. DAC fought the attempted eviction, and won the case in 1984 after a public inquiry by the Department of the Environment.

Helped by URBED's (Urbanism, Environment and Design Ltd.) 'Re-use of Industrial Buildings Service' by February 1984, the Diorama Arts Trust was formed to propose a scheme which resulted in a £4 million fundraising effort through and beyond 1984.

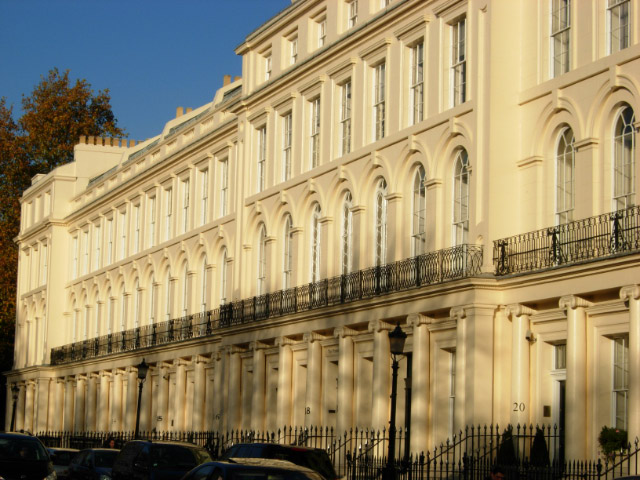
Numbers 13-24 and attached railings of the Diorama, Bedford College Annexe (2007)

CAST (Cartoon Archetypical Slogan Theatre, led by Roland Muldoon) agreed to become members of Diorama Arts in June and July 1984. In August 1984, the CEC began an appeal to reverse Camden Council's (CC) failure to allow renovation of the Diorama. CC's director of planning and communications refused a planning application submitted by Hunter & Partners on behalf of the CEC in August 1986.

The National Archives has a catalogue "The Diorama, Regent's Park" covering the dates 1 December 1985 to 31 December 1988. The website Library of Book refers to "Diorama Arts Trust Correspondence May 1986 To October 1990": "Correspondence from the Diorama Arts Trust (of which Denys Lasdun was a patron) over the future of the historic Diorama building in Regents Park."

On 25 January 1990, the Diorama Arts Trust held a press conference which included a press release, a list of trust members and reactions to the trust's plans to preserve the Diorama. According to the Old Diorama website, "... Diorama Arts Centre Ltd. combines a wide range of artistic activities organised in such a way as to provide a self-funding public building dedicated to the arts. Only after several years of campaigning through the courts and in the community have we been able to rescue the building from neglect, obscurity and demolition." At Christmas 1992, Diorama Arts Centre left the building as the CEC and CC relocated the organisation to a new development in nearby Osnaburgh Street.

== Music ==
Elvis Costello wrote in his song, "London's Brilliant Parade", "The lovely Diorama is really part of the drama, I'd say". Percussionist Jon Keliehor of Matchbox Theatre began a music studio around 1976, which continued until 1984 and was later called the Diorama Percussion Music Research Unit. During his time at the Diorama, Keliehor continued writing music for dance, drama and theatre. Through his involvement with the London Contemporary Dance Theatre, early support came from co-founder and CEO Robin Howard. The 1977 Many Ways of Moving conference resulted in the Diorama becoming a centre of the alternative dance movement network.

Between 1976 and 1992, musicians who played at the Diorama included:

- Nick Cave and the Bad Seeds played on 30 October 1984. It was Cave's third appearance. Other performers included Lydia Lunch and Jessamy Calkin.
- The Bow Gamelan Ensemble performed in the summer of 1985, and was reviewed in Performance Magazine.
- Billy Bragg, as part of the Red Wedge tour, played on 11 January 1986. The benefit performance included Skint Video.
- Rave and dance-music events were held in 1989 and 1990, which included Arc, Crazy Feet, Karma, Menace, Project 679 and TomTom Club.
- Towering Inferno recorded their album, Kaddish, at the Diorama in 1991: "We knew we had to get a mythic, religious sound and we knew from playing there that the Diorama has a five or six second reverb."
- The Manic Street Preachers played in December 1991.
- The Pogues: "'You gotta see the Pogues', recalls Chevron. 'They are the happening band in London at the moment.' On 22 June, Elvis dutifully went along to the Diorama in Euston ..."
- The London Musician's Collective operated from the Diorama at the end of the 1980s: "The organisation camped out in Simon's office in the Diorama, Regents Park, and contemplated its venue-less future. Events were organised at the Diorama, Red Rose, Air Gallery and Tom Allen Centre in Stratford, but a proper home proved hard to find."

== Art ==
Artists who have exhibited at the Diorama include:

- Rafael Klein exhibited four times as part of group shows in 1989, 1990, 1991, and 1992.
- Tai-Shan Schierenberg had solo exhibitions in 1988 and 1991.
- In 1990, as part of a group show, Catherine Yass exhibited Madonnas.
- Lucy Jones was part of "Out of Ourselves", a 1990 group exhibition.
- Phyllida Barlow curated "Three Sculptures", a 1992 group exhibition which included Up Across Around.
- In 1992, Rob Ryan exhibited as one of the artists against Clause 28.

== Drama, video and film ==
Graeae Theatre Company began using the building as rehearsal space in February 1980 before performances at the University of Guildford in May of that year and a tour of the United States shortly thereafter: Quoting: "It was going to take two or three months to get the show together. Some of the cast members were working, with full time 9 to 5 jobs, 5 days a week. Secondly, one was a full time mother and thirdly we were from various parts of Britain." Videographers and filmmakers included Gaynor O'Flynn, Richard Layzell and Katharine Meynell. In 1982, Cosey Fanni Tutti recorded "Diorama - live action by Cosey at the Diorama."

Art in Danger, in 1985 and 1986, included the Bow Gamelan Ensemble, Richard Layzell, Anne Seagrave and the Wild Wigglers. The East London Theatre Archive has CAST New Variety at the Diorama flyer images dating from 1984. A number of items on the Diorama during the 1980s and 1990s are part of the Bill Douglas Cinema Museum collection, including item numbers: 97928, 97933, 97934, 97939, 97944, 97945, 97947 and 97949 from 1982 to 1992.

The London Disabilities Forum (LDF) held their first annual general meeting at the Diorama in April 1988; that month, a cabaret (later to become the Workhorse) was launched. The LDF staged "Out of Ourselves", a visual-arts exhibition, in February 1990. In June of that year, Shape Arts staged the "No Excuses Theatre Cabaret" by a Liverpool-based company of disabled actors. Drama collective The Mombasa Roadshow drama collective performed "The White Devil" in March 1989 and "The Bacchae" in April 1990.

== Other activities ==
The Philadelphia Association (PA) had an office and, later, a consulting room in the Diorama by 1981; the PA's Hilary Randall and Paul Zeal became directors of the DACL. Collusion magazine was based at the Diorama in 1982 and 1983. The magazine was founded by Steve Beresford, Sue Steward and David Toop in 1981, and its musical content included experimental, global, popular and world. After five issues, the magazine ceased publication in September 1983.

Performance magazine was based at the Diorama from 1982 to 1987: "Between 1979-1992 Performance Magazine documented an extraordinary period in the development of art in the UK. With its maverick and punk ethos Performance Magazine embodied an immensely active community of artists, writers and publics that crossed disciplines throughout the late 70s, 80s and the start of the 90s." The fashion company Slag had a studio at the Diorama from 1984 until its 1992 closure: "They're 25ish, have no admitted names other than Andy (him) and Adie (her) - collectively Slag ... They perch in a workroom in a run-down peculiarity of a building - the Diorama - and their place looks like a carnival novelties store, or a backstage attic prior to final closure. But then, they belong to that generation which grew up in playspace cluttered with encouragements to creativity ..." Studio Upstairs had a studio at the Diorama from 1989: "At Studio Upstairs, people with psychiatric problems have a place to express their interests and abilities through art ... Behind its Regency facade, Diorama's interior hides a hive of activity including a cafe (The Octagon), Tai Chi classes, and musicians of all sorts". The Neo Naturists body painters presented a May Day performance at the Diorama in 1990.
