= Don Parkinson (disambiguation) =

Don or Donald Parkinson may refer to:

- Don Parkinson (politician), lawyer and a politician in Guam
- Don Parkinson (1936-present), a New Zealand former rugby league footballer
- Donald Parkinson (architect)
