= ODAC =

ODAC may refer to:

- Oil Depletion Analysis Centre, an independent UK-registered educational charity
- Old Dominion Athletic Conference, a collegiate athletics conference in the southeastern United States
- Oncologic Drugs Advisory Committee
- Oracle Data Access Components - tools for Oracle databases
- Old Diorama Arts Centre - Arts Charity in London
