= Taniwharau =

Taniwharau may refer to:

- 'a hundred Taniwha'
- Taniwharau Rugby League Club, in Huntly, New Zealand
