= The Diorama, Regent's Park =

Theatre in London, United Kingdom

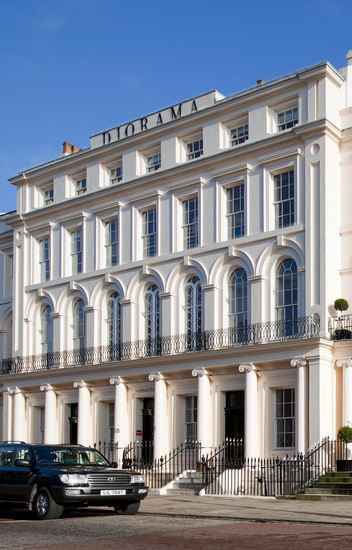
- Interactive map of the The Diorama, Regent's Park area

General information
- Type: Theatre
- Architectural style: Regency
- Location: United Kingdom, 18 Park Square East, NW1 4LH, London
- Opened: 29 September 1823
- Closed: 1852
- Client: John Arrowsmith

Design and construction
- Architect: Augustus Charles Pugin
- Main contractor: Jacob Smith

The Diorama, Regent's Park, London, was a specialised theatre built in 1823 to show large, dramatized tableaux paintings as entertainment.

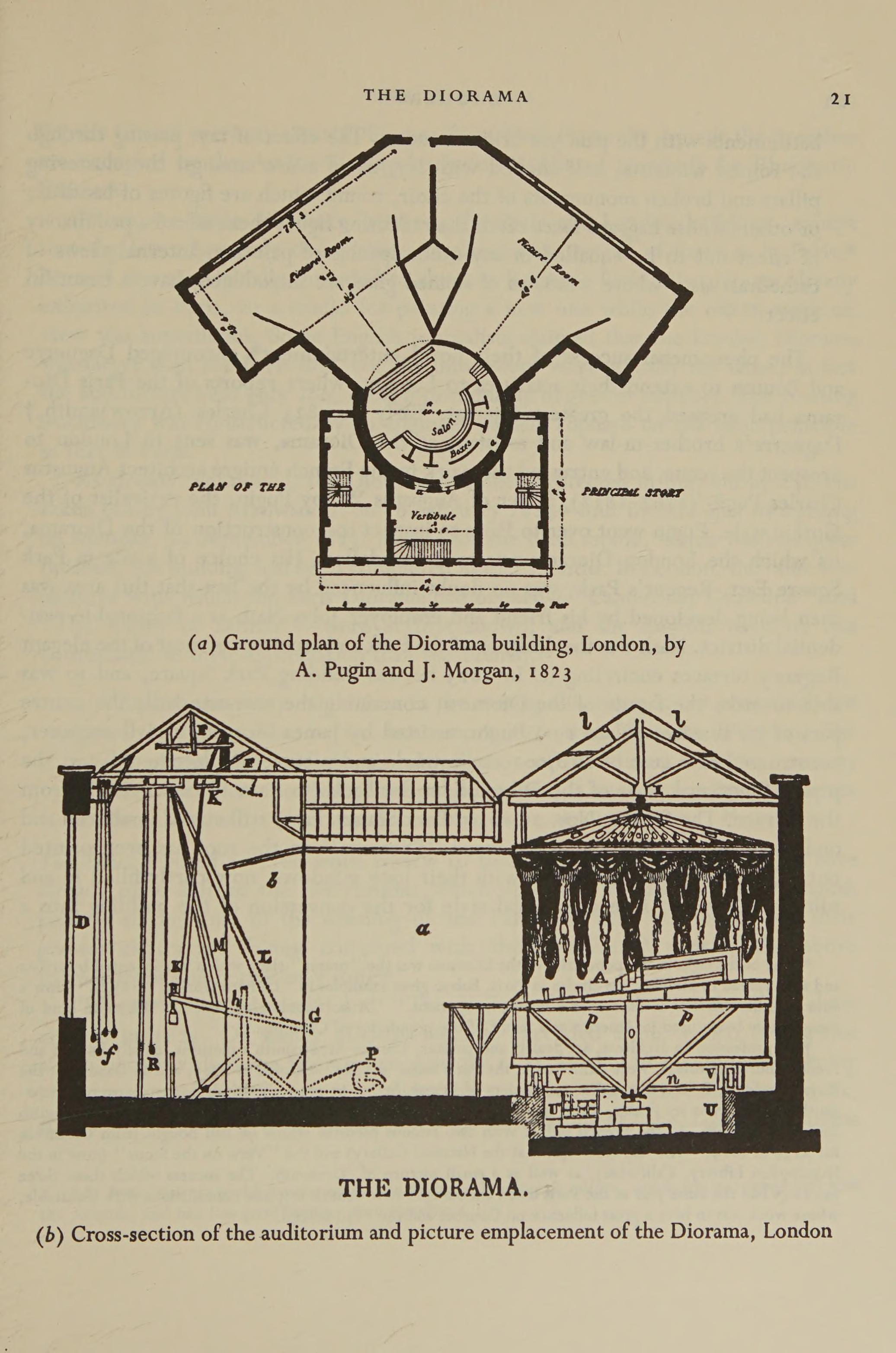
Plan of the London Diorama Building (illustration reproduced from Gernsheim 1968, p 21)

== Origins in London ==
Dioramas were perspective painted scenes dramatized with lighting and other effects that were a precursor of the cinema. Their genesis in London was devised by the painter Philippe de Loutherbourg and set up in Lisle Street, Soho, in 1781. It consisted of a 10 ft wide box within which a series of moving and mechanically operated scenes, such as a storm at sea, were displayed. Earlier, non-moving, forerunners were the panoramas and the peepshows of the streets and fairgrounds as depicted by William Hogarth in his engraving of Southwark Fair.

From 1820 the Cosmorama (from the Greek words kosmos and orama, meaning "world" and "scene") in St James's Street, Mayfair and later Regent Street became a fashionable meeting place. It featured fourteen peepholes onto perspective scenes using large convex lenses, mirrors and special lighting to create scenic effects. Then, in Paris in 1822, Charles-Marie Bouton (1781– 1853), a Troubador painter, and Louis Jacques Mandé Daguerre (1787–1851), a skilful painter of trompe-l'œil and later inventor of the first practical form of photography, produced their remarkable Dioramas (from the Greek words dia and orama, meaning "through" and "scene"). They followed up their Paris success with Dioramas in Berlin and London in 1823.

== The Regent's Park Diorama ==
In the 1820s London was experiencing a building boom and John Nash's grand plan for Regent's Park and its fashionable terraces was well underway. The site chosen for London's Diorama was in the south-east of the Park, behind the Park Square East terrace with its public entrance in the centre of the façade at no. 18. The plots on either side, numbers 17 & 19, were also allocated and were built as part of the development as private houses. John Arrowsmith, brother-in-law of Louis Daguerre, commissioned the architect Augustus Charles Pugin, who was working for Nash at the time, and the builder Jacob Smith to design and build a Diorama during the summer of 1823. Daguerre initially ran it in partnership with Bouton, after which it was managed by his protégé, the painter Charles-Caïus Renoux.

The audience of up to 200 sat thirty to forty feet from the canvases in a dark circular "saloon" at the centre of the building which was "tastefully decorated, and fitted up with boxes and a pit". The saloon was rotated through 73 degrees by an arrangement of wheels beneath its timber frame so that the two huge painted scenes could be displayed alternately in the two "picture rooms". The proscenium arches, which were 24 feet (7.3m) wide by 21 feet (6.4m) high were alternately exposed, so while one was open to the audience, the other was closed by the shell of the auditorium wall and could be rearranged for the next display. The machinery, designed by James Morgan and built by an engineer called Topham, was so well poised that the whole auditorium could be turned by a single man. Usually one of the two scenes was a landscape and the other was landmark building, each hand-painted on calico, which was made transparent in selected areas.

A corridor with black walls behind the proscenium arches led to the stage, near the back of which was hung the main picture. The paintings, which could be rolled up on huge cylinders, measured 72 ft (22m) wide by 40 ft (12m) high and were painted with translucent and opaque colours. Behind the painting rose tall windows to naturally light the translucent areas while the opaque areas were lit from directional skylights in the roof of the dark corridor. The lighting effects could be modified, with dramatic effects, by an elaborate system of shutters pulled by cords, some being made of coloured fabric which could overlay one another as required, so that almost limitless mixtures of colours and lighting could be achieved. Solid objects were often placed in front of the painting to heighten the realism. Daylight only was used so that foggy days marred performances. Each spectacle was shown for 10-I5 minutes before the auditorium was rotated to show the other tableau.

The London Diorama opened on 29 September 1823 with paintings from Messrs Daguerre and Bouton's Paris Diorama depicting the Interior of Canterbury Cathedral and the Valley of the Sarnen. It proved an immediate success and Bouton remained behind in England to run the new establishment.

The artist John Constable went to the opening and wrote to his friend, Archdeacon Fisher: "It is in part a transparency, the spectator is in a dark chamber, and it is very pleasing and has great illusion. It is without the pale of the art, because its object is deception. The art pleases by reminding not by deceiving. The place was filled by foreigners, and I seemed to be in a cage of magpies."

A popular later tableau, A Midnight Mass of St Etienne-du-Mont, was described in detail by mystified eye-witness: "At first it is daylight; we see the nave with its chairs; little by little the light wanes and the candles are lighted. At the back of the choir the church is illuminated, and the congregation arriving take their places in front of the chairs, not suddenly, as if the scenes were shifted, but gradually. The midnight mass begins. In this reverent stillness the organ peals out from under the distant vaults. Then the daylight slowly returns, the congregation disperses, the candles are extinguished and the church with its chairs appears as at the beginning. This was magic!"

The entrance fee for the Diorama was two shillings and it did very well for several years, £200 being taken on Easter Monday in 1824. Topographical scenes, such as the Castle of Stolzenfels on the Rhine or the Cloister of St Wandrille in Normandy, were the most popular. One of the last tableaux, in 1851, the year of the Great Exhibition, was Mount Etna at sunrise, sunset, and in glorious eruption with organ accompaniment.

Takings declined steadily during the 1830s, in part due to competition from rival dioramas, and by 1848 the building and contents were put up for sale. It struggled on for another four years until 1852 when it finally closed and was sold for £3,000.

== Later uses of the building ==
The lease was taken over by Samuel Morton Peto (later knighted), the builder and railway magnate, who gutted it to create a Baptist chapel which it remained until its lease expired in 1922. A few years later it was taken over by the Red Cross, for their Rheumatic Diseases hospital (later the Arthur Stanley Institute) which moved out in 1964 after becoming part of the Middlesex Hospital. The following year Bedford College took a nine-year lease for their Geography, Zoology and Social Research Departments.

The twenty years after the College vacated in 1973 saw a series of planning applications in an attempt to find a long-term use for the Diorama, during which time it was occupied by the Diorama Arts Cooperative, an artists' and actors' co-operative. The Old Diorama Arts Centre history page states: "In the 1970s, the original Diorama Arts Centre was formed in empty building by Regent's Park ..." Christmas 1992 saw Diorama Arts Centre Ltd leaving the building to be rehoused by Camden Council.

In 1994 the building was refurbished by The Prince's Trust and used as its offices for over twenty years. After the Trust vacated the building, there were several attempts to find alternative acceptable uses for this last surviving building of its type. Planning consent was finally granted in 2020 to return the two flanking town houses, 17 & 19 Park Square East, to separate residential use, and retain the Diorama as offices.

An Encyclopedia of London Theatres states: "1973 Converted into a mosque, later the home of the Prince's Trust charity."

Photographer Arthur Gill visited the site in the mid-seventies, writing about it in the journal History of Photography. Quoting: "However, try as I would, my imagination was unable to sweep away the modern amendments and adaptions, and recapture the Diorama. Except for that concrete–filled well ... everything has gone beyond recall”.

== Gallery ==
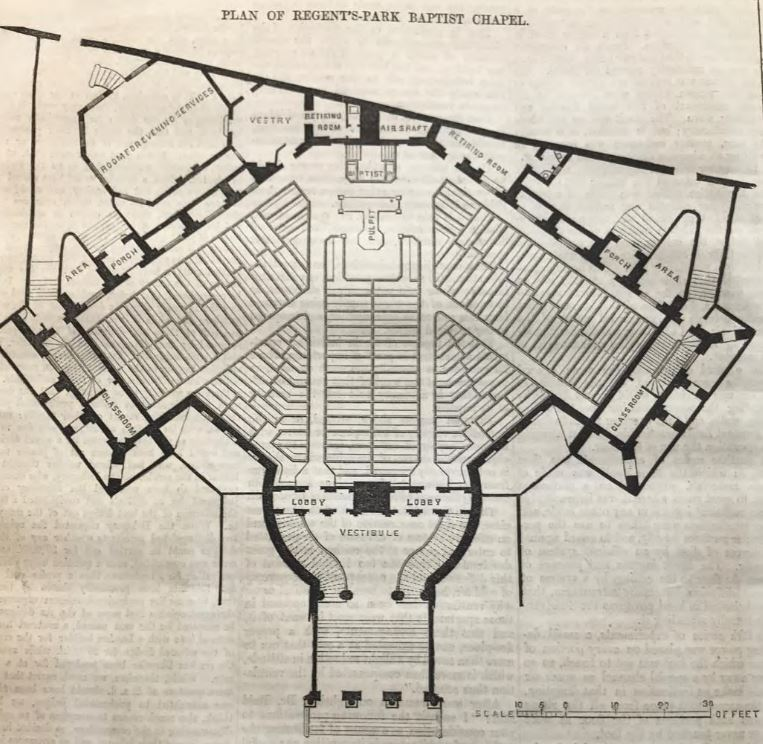
Plan of the Regent's Park Baptist Chapel (illustration reproduced from The Builder, 1855)

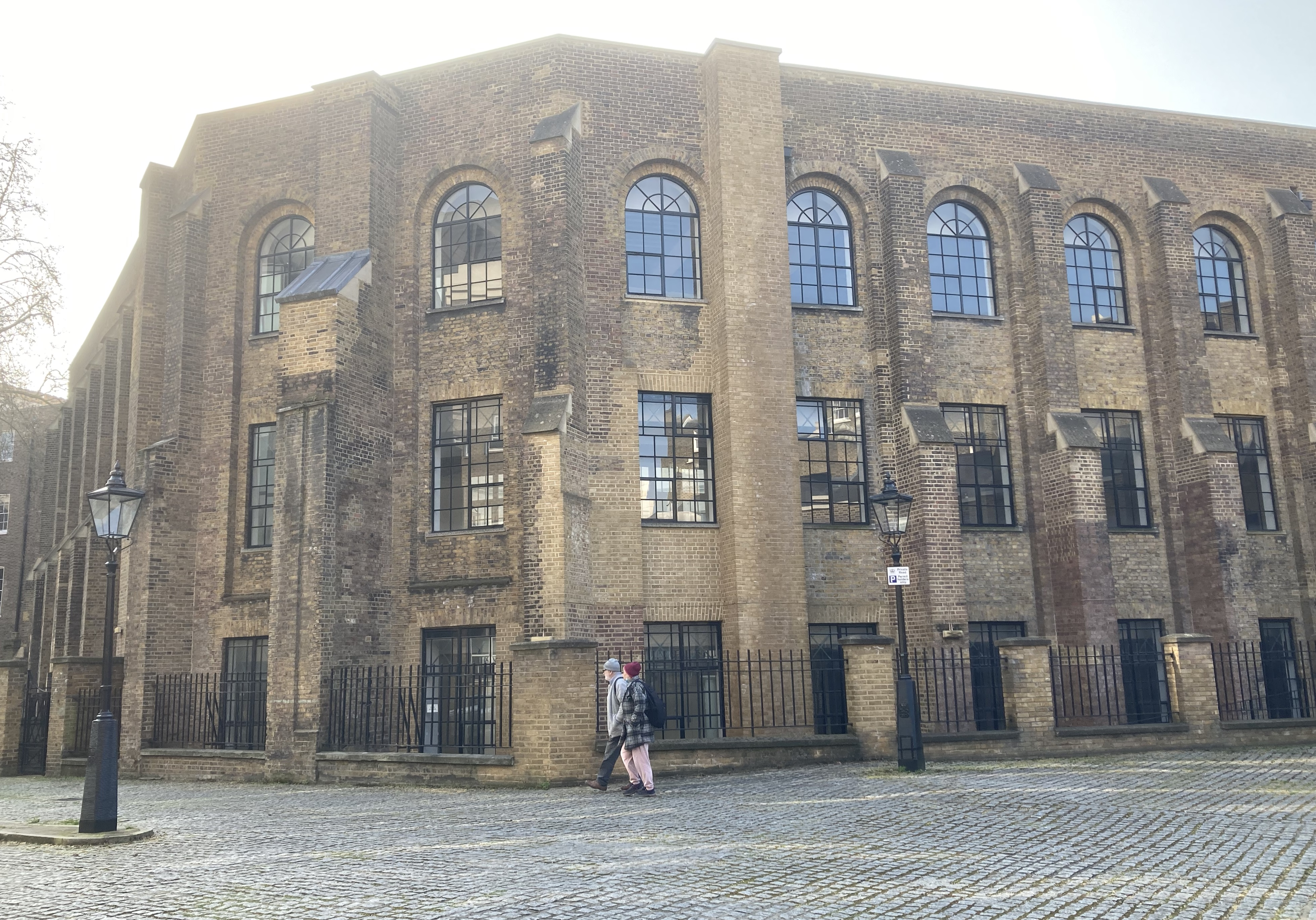
The rear of the Diorama on Peto Place
