= Bay of Plenty rugby league team =

New Zealand rugby league team

Bay of Plenty Stags
Club information
- Full name: Bay of Plenty Rugby League Football Club
- Nickname: Lakers
- Colours: Blue; Yellow
- Founded: 1995
- Exited: 2009

Former details
- Grounds: Rotorua International Stadium; Puketewhero Park
- Competition: Bartercard Premiership

The Bay of Plenty rugby league team (also known as the Bay of Plenty Lakers) are a New Zealand rugby league team who represents the Bay of Plenty Rugby League in New Zealand Rugby League competitions. Between 1994 and 1996 they competed in the Lion Red Cup competition, while in 2008 and 2009 they competed in the Bartercard Premiership.

== History ==
=== Early Efforts ===
In 1921 former New Zealand international George Iles moved from Auckland to live in Tauranga. In 1922 he was part of an effort to establish rugby league in the Tauranga area. The Tauranga Rugby League was started in March, 1922 and they looked to play rugby league teams from other areas. They made efforts to organise a game with the newly formed Rotorua league team. On the 16th of September history was made in Tauranga with the first ever game of rugby league played there. Tauranga took on the Rotorua team on the Tauranga Domain. Rotorua won a high scoring match 29–28.

After this match the first ever Bay of Plenty rugby league team was selected to play against the touring New South Wales side. The Bay of Plenty team featured George Iles, along with future Kiwis George Gardiner and Hec McDonald while the visiting NSW team featured the likes of Frank Burge and Reg Latta. New South Wales won the match 29 points to 5 with David Borell scoring a try and Joseph Rogers kicking a goal for the local team.

Efforts were then made to arrange a match with an Auckland team and this eventuated with Auckland sending a very strong team down to play the Bay of Plenty side in Tauranga on October 7. George Iles captained the Bay of Plenty side who went down 27–33 to an Auckland team which featured a large number of New Zealand international players such as Clarrie Polson, Wally Somers, and future Kiwi's Lou Brown, Neville St George, and Jim O'Brien.

=== Lion Red Cup ===
The Lion Red Cup team was coached by Neil Joyce and Lawrence Brydon and collected two wooden spoon's, in 1994 and 1995. However, in 1996 they finished fifth, losing the elimination playoff. Notable players included Alex Chan.

The Stags drew players from both the Bay of Plenty Rugby League and the Coastlines Rugby League competitions.

==== Season results ====
Season	Pld	W	D	L	PF	PA	PD	Pts	Position	Finals
1994	22	2	0	20	262	800	-538	4	Wooden Spoon	N/A
1995	22	2	1	19	304	752	-448	5	Wooden Spoon	N/A
1996	22	11	3	8	440	441	-1	25	Fifth	Lost Elimination Play-off

=== Bartercard Cup ===
Between 2004 and 2008 they were represented by the Waicoa Bay Stallions in the Bartercard Cup. The Stallions represented the Waikato Rugby League and Coastlines Rugby League as well as the Bay of Plenty Rugby League.

=== Bartercard Premiership ===
In 2008 and 2009 the Bay of Plenty provincial side competed in the National Provincial Competition. Former Kiwis coach Graham Lowe was the coach of the side for 2008. In 2009 they did not win a game and finished sixth.

==== Season results ====
Season	Pld	W	D	L	PF	PA	PD	Pts	Position	Finals
2008	5	1	0	4	114	186	-72	2	Fifth	N/A
2009	5	0	0	5	70	254	-184	0	Wooden Spoon	N/A
