= Bartercard Premiership =

New Zealand rugby league competition

- Sport: Rugby league
- Instituted: 2008
- Inaugural season: 2008
- Ceased: 2009
- Replaced by: National Zonal Competition
- Number of teams: 6
- Country: New Zealand
- Premiers: Canterbury
- Website: leaguenet.co.nz

The NZRL Bartercard Premiership was a six-team rugby league competition that ran in 2008 and 2009. It replaced the now-defunct Bartercard Cup competition as the highest level of rugby league in New Zealand. Matches have been broadcast on SKY Network Television and Māori Television. In 2009 the competition was mirrored by Under 18 and Under 16 grade competitions. The competition was replaced by the seven-team National Zonal Competition in 2010.

== Teams ==
In both season, 6 teams represented different regions of New Zealand. The league operated on a single group system, with no divisions or conferences and no relegation and promotion from other leagues.

The 6 regions which competed in the Bartercard Premiership are given below:

#	Province	Stadium	Established
2	Auckland	Mount Smart Stadium, Auckland	1908
4	Bay of Plenty Stags	Puketawhero Park, Rotorua	1908
14	Canterbury Bulls	Rugby League Park, Christchurch	1912
7	Taranaki Sharks	Yarrow Stadium, New Plymouth	1908
3	Waikato	Davies Park, Huntly; Paterson Park, Ngāruawāhia	1908
9	Wellington	Porirua Park, Porirua	1908

The map below shows the locations of the 6 competing provinces within New Zealand:

New Zealand

== List of premiers ==
Two seasons of the Bartercard Premiership were contested, the most successful club in the short history of the competition being Canterbury.

Season	Grand final			Minor premiers
Season	Premiers	Score	Runners-up	Minor premiers
2008	Auckland	38-10	Canterbury Bulls	Canterbury Bulls (10 pts)
2009	Canterbury Bulls	26-20	Auckland	Canterbury Bulls (10 pts)

== History ==
=== 2008 ===
The inaugural representative season started on the weekend of August 23 and 24, 2008. The first Grand Final was held at Mount Smart Stadium on September 28.

=== 2009 ===
The second season of the Bartercard Premiership saw an extension of the competition to two junior grades; an under 16s and 18s competition.

In the Seniors competition, Canterbury achieved their first Premiership in the new competition in a rematch of the 2008 final, defeating Auckland at Rugby League Park, Christchurch.

The 2009 season was the last competition contested with this name and format, with the Premiership being replaced by the National Zonal Competition in 2010.
