= Resthills Park =

Sports venue in Glenview, New Zealand

Coordinates: 37.82825°S 175.28632°E

Resthills Park is a multi-use sports venue and public park located in Glenview, an outer suburb of Hamilton, New Zealand.

The location is currently the proud home ground for Waikato Softball and Waikato Rugby League, and has hosted community-focused Urban Rogaines orienteering events, a pop-up disc golf course, and the 2024 NZ Outdoor Archery Championships.

A Friends of Resthills group operates under the umbrella of Hamilton City Council's Nature in the City programme and focuses on underplanting of established areas and pest control.

== Major events ==
- NZ Outdoor Archery Championships - April 2024
- NZ Softball U17 Boys National Championship: 15 - 18 January 2026
- North Island U15 Boys Rugby League Tournament: 31st August - 3rd September 2026
- NZ Heartland Fastpitch Softball Tournament: 28th - 31st January 2027
- 62nd NZ Men's Evergreens Softball Tournament: 5th-6th March 2027

== History ==
The land in this area was farmland and owned by the Reynolds family. When Glenview was developed in the 1960's it became Resthills Park. The land in this area was originally farmland owned by the Reynolds family before being developed into the suburb of Glenview during the 1960s, at which time Resthills Park was established.

As part of a wider Something special about Glenview - a summary of the Glenview community oral history project housed at the Hamilton City Library, Mark Randrup provides personal insights into Beazley Homes construction projects surrounding the park — including the Sunnyhills and Resthills developments—while discussing the broader development of the area. These iconic home designs were later captured by New Zealand artist Jon Tootill in his work Glenview.

The Resthills Sports Centre within the park has acted as a central clubhouse and event space since opening on 14 July 1995 by the then mayor of Hamilton, Margaret Evans, and provides an important community identity and community space.It previously served as the home ground for Waikato Rugby League in the Bartercard Premiership rugby league and WaiCoa Bays competitions, home ground for Waikato Softball, as well as the Waikato FC football (soccer) team in the New Zealand Football Championship.

== Facilities ==
- Three Rugby League fields
- Two skinned Softball diamonds
- Community Playground
- Off-leash dog exercise area
- Walking tracks
- Public Toilets, Sports Changing Rooms and shower facilities
- Resthills Sports Centre - Community Space

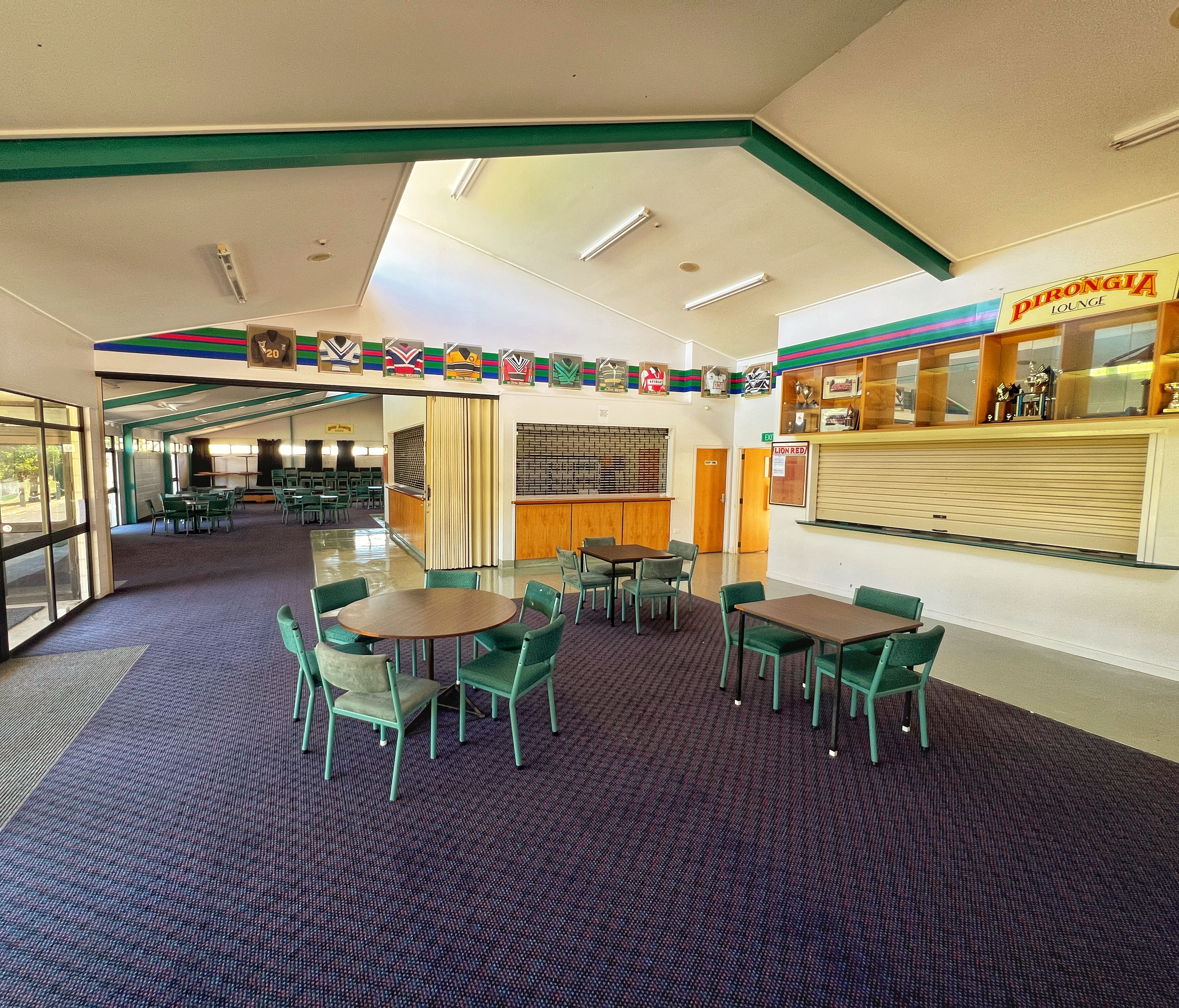
Pirongia Lounge at Resthills Sports Centre

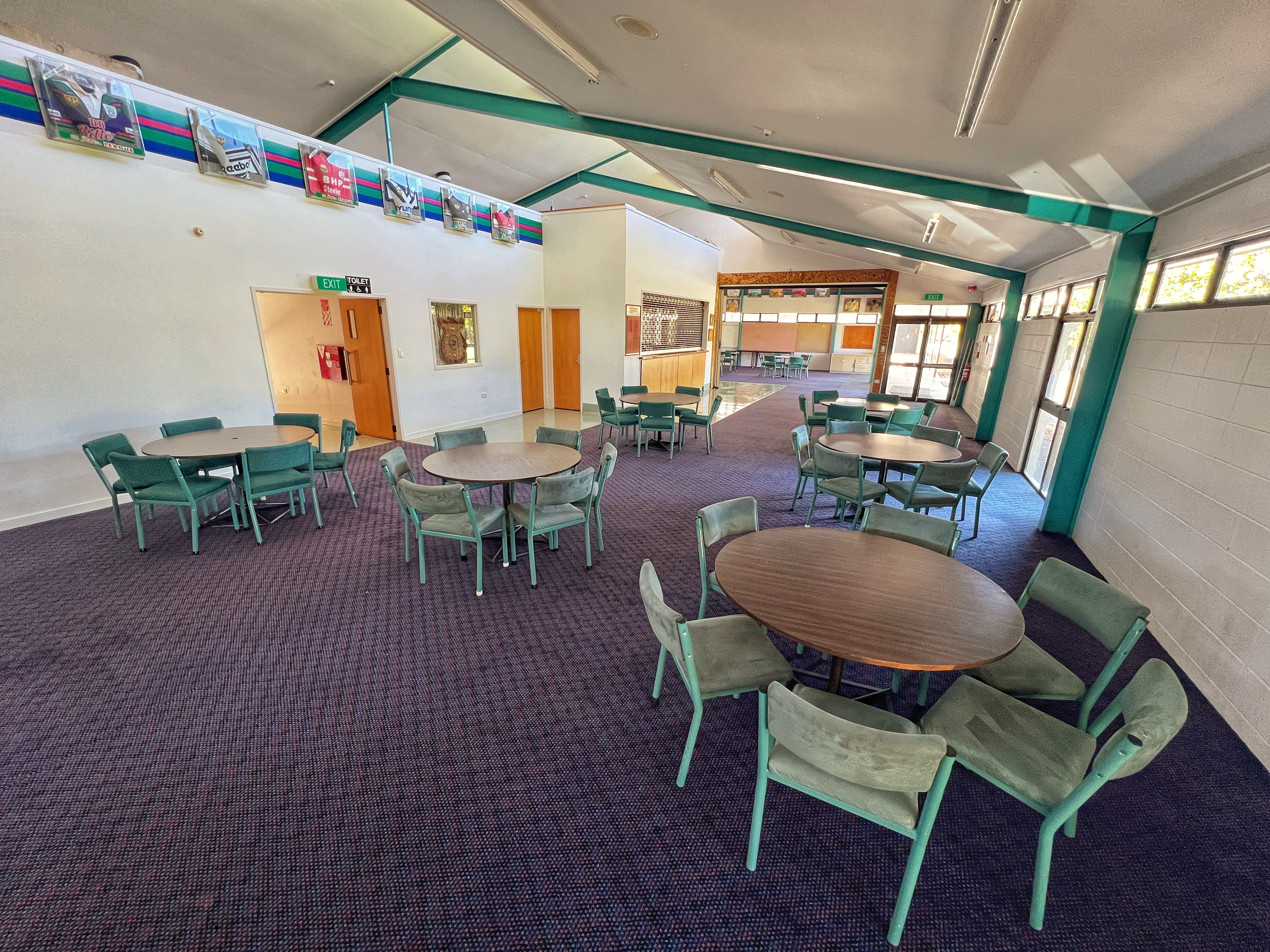
Rehe Joseph Lounge at Resthills Sports Centre

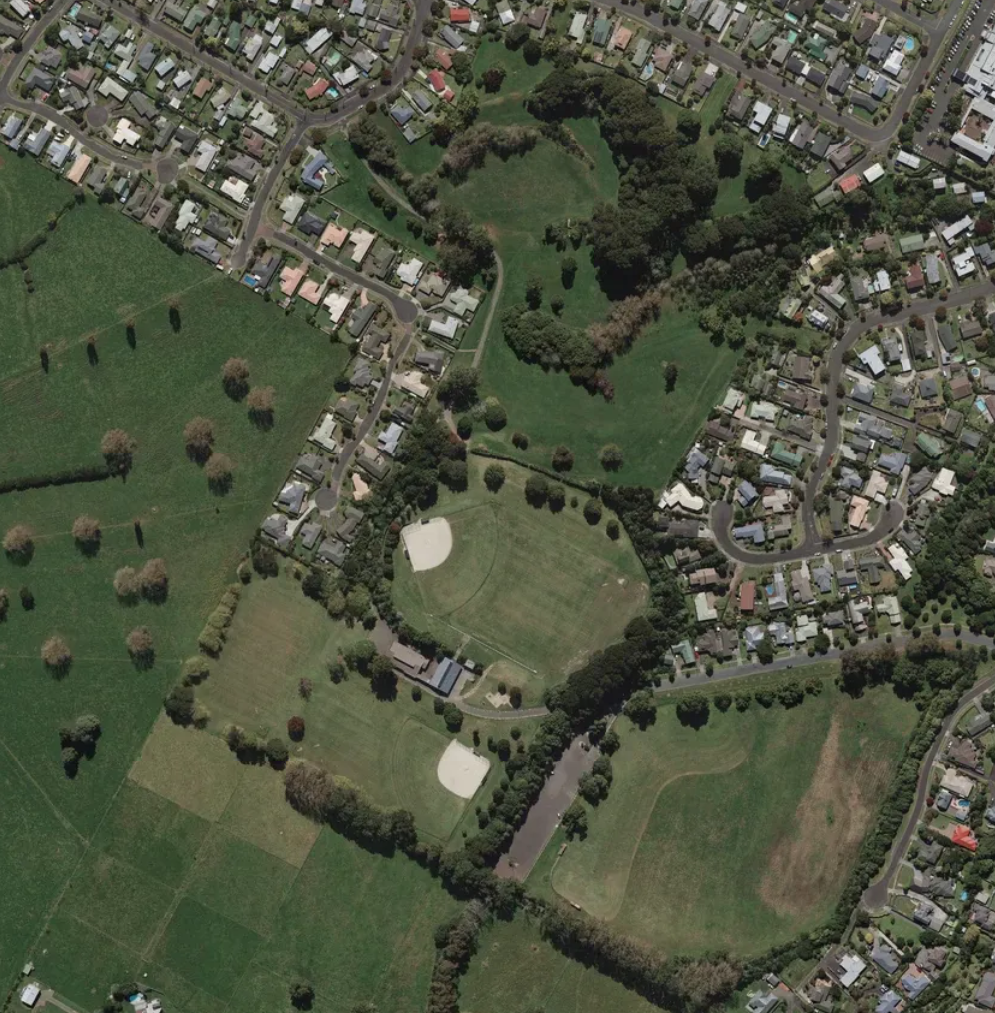
Aerial Map of Resthills Park
