= Hamilton City Tigers =

Hamilton City Tigers Rugby League Club

Club information
- Full name: Hamilton City Tigers Rugby League Club
- Nickname(s): Tigers, City Tigers
- Colours: Black and Orange
- Founded: 1965

Current details
- Ground: Resthills Park
- Competition: Waikato Rugby League and WaiCoa Competition

Records
- Premierships: 6
- Waicoa Bay Premierships: 2011, 2012 2016
- Waikato Club Competition: 1993, 2010, 2012, 2015

The Hamilton City Tigers are a rugby league club from Hamilton, New Zealand. The club competes in the Waikato Rugby League club competition. The Tigers have won the Waikato Competition on four occasions and the Waicoa Bay Competition on three occasions

== History ==
The Hamilton City Tigers were founded in 1965. They play in a black and orange strip and are based at Resthills Park, Hamilton.

They are one of the three Premier Rugby League clubs still active in Hamilton along with Hukanui Rugby League Club and United Rugby League Club.

Despite Hamilton being a stronghold of Rugby Union, the club has been very successful in the Waikato Rugby League keeping very competitive with the stronger North Waikato Clubs. In 2010 The Hamilton City Tigers won their first Waikato Premiership in 17 years beating 3 time defending Champions Taniwharau 19-12 at Resthills Park. They won The Premiership again in 2012 defeating Taniwharau 34-4 at Davies Park then for a third time in 2015 defeating Taniwharau 33-12 at Davies Park. They have also won the Waicoa Bay Premiership twice, in 2011 defeating Taniwharau 26-6 at Resthills Park and in 2012 defeating Ngaruawahia Panthers 26-12.

== Notable players ==
- Mark Horo ( Kiwis International)
- Shane Horo (Kiwis International)
- Baumont Dawson (Waikato Cougars)
- Arnold King (Waikato Cougars)
- Tukere Barlow (New Zealand Maori, Waikato Cougars)
- Paul Morrison (New Zealand Maori, Waikato Cougars)
- Nathan York (New Zealand Maori, Waikato Cougars)
- Tainui Raihe (New Zealand Maori, Waikato Cougars)
- Namu Puru (New Zealand Maori, Waicoa Bay Stallions)
- Vaughan Calcinai(Waicoa Bay)
- Simon Beale (New Zealand Maori, Waicoa Bay Stallions)
- John JT Taituha (Waicoa Bay Stallions, WA Maori Rugby League, Rockingham Sharks WA)
- Hayden Karena (New Zealand Maori, Waicoa Bay Stallions)
- Ray Wallace (New Zealand Warriors U20, Waicoa Bay Stallions)
- Nick Read (Sydney Roosters U20, Cronulla Sharks U20, New Zealand Maori, Waicoa Bay Stallions)
- Terry Kopua (Waicoa Bay Stallions)
- Faa Leilua (Waicoa Bay Stallions)
- Eli Paul (Waicoa Bay Stallions)
- Issac Robinson (Waicoa Bay Stallions, Central Vipers)

http://www.stuff.co.nz/waikato-times/sport/71160141/Hamilton-City-Tigers-win-premier-rugby-league-final-against-Taniwharauhttps://www.stuff.co.nz/waikato-times/sport/83141687/hamilton-city-tigers-vaughan-calcinai-may-have-finished-on-biggest-possible-high
