= Don Parkinson =

New Zealand international rugby league footballer

Personal information
- Full name: Donald Parkinson
- Born: 1 October 1936 (age 90) Huntly, New Zealand

Playing information
- Position: Hooker
Club
Years	Team	Pld	T	G	FG	P
	Taniwharau
Representative
Years	Team	Pld	T	G	FG	P
	Waikato
1968–71	New Zealand	4	2	0	0	0

Don Parkinson is a New Zealand former rugby league footballer who represented New Zealand in 1968.

== Playing career ==
From Huntly, Parkinson played for the Taniwharau Rugby League Club and represented Waikato. A hooker, Parkinson represented the Kiwis in 1968.

== Later years ==
In 2005 Parkinson was fined and sentenced to 400 hours' community work after he had mistakenly shot another hunter while out deer hunting.
