= Katharine Meynell =

Katharine Meynell is a British video artist, a scholar and an author.

== Biography ==
She earned a Master in Environmental Media at Royal College of Art, London in 1983. In 2000 she earned a PhD with a thesis in Time Based Art in Britain since 1980 – an account of interdisciplinary practice, Painting School, Royal College of Art, 2000. She was an Abbey Fellow at the British School at Rome in 2003/2004.

== Works ==
She started using video in 1980. Her first video artwork is entitled Housework. Her works include: RCA Women's Group (1982), Diary, Belly (1983), Momento (1983), The Sister's Story (1984), Untitled - Entopic Pregnancy (1985) Hannah's Song (5 screen), A Book For A Performance (2 screen) (1986), Light, Water, Power (4 screen, with Alistair Skinner), Black Stock Estate Tapes, Group Portrait (3 screen video) (1987), Her Gaze (2 screen video), Medusa (1988), Moonrise (3 screen) (1989) Ants and Balls (2 screen). As She Opened Her Eyes She Looked Over Her Shoulder and Saw Someone Passing The Other Side of the Doorway With a Strange Smile (funded by BBC) (1990), Eat (5 screen) Vampire Seat (1992), Poznan Installation (1993). Andrea Phillips has written on her work: "Katharine Meynell's work bridges a divide between the overt and politicised psychoanalytic tendencies of 1980s and early 90s post-feminist image-making and an altogether more disenfranchised landscape - that perhaps of today - in which no such recourse to history and theory seems tenable and questions of art's criticality are paramount".

Her works have been exhibiting in several solo shows and group exhibitions, including: The Island Bell in Digital Aesthetics, The Harris Museum, Preston (2001), Iceberg, Bread, Tunny in ‘From Floor to Sky’ at Ambika P3 Gallery, University of Westminster, London, Poetry of Unknown Words (Gefn Press) Poetry Library, South Bank (2012)

She is author of several books, essays and articles.

== List of authored books ==
- Seas of the moon, gefn Press, London 1988
- Eat Book, gefn Press, London & Janus Press, Vermont 1990
- Emissions, Book Works, London & gefn Press, London 1992
- Janet! John! Lets go to the toilet!, gefn Press, London 2000
- It's Inside, Marion Boyars, London and New York 2005
