= Paterson Park =

Park in Bermondsey, London, England

Coordinates: 51.489°N 0.068°W

Paterson Park is located in Bermondsey, in central South East London, and is managed by the London Borough of Southwark. It was formally opened in 1953.

== Origins ==
What is now Paterson Park was built out as railway sidings into the Bricklayers Arms goods station in 1844. Some of the sidings were bombed during the war, and not rebuilt. It was one of the many bomb sites in London that became a children’s playground after the war, including an informal cycle speedway track. The park was formally opened in 1953, by the former Prime Minister Clement Attlee, and named after the prison reformer Sir Alexander Paterson. Attlee and Paterson had met at University College, Oxford. Both were involved in boys’ clubs in slum areas of London. Paterson spent 21 years living in Bermondsey, initially with John Stansfeld’s Oxford Medical Mission. When he enlisted in WWI, he did so with the Bermondsey Battalion (the Queens) of the London Regiment. As formally laid out in 1953, the park included a paddling pool and a purpose-built cycle speedway. The park was the home cycle speedway track for the Lynton Lynx, named for the adjacent street.

== Later history and reduction in size ==
Although the park was extended after the goods station was closed in 1981, it was poorly maintained.

A campaign began in 1999 for a new secondary school in Southwark. The only suitable location identified was land on and adjacent to Paterson Park. By this time, park maintenance was such that education campaigners were able to describe the park as disused.

In 2002, the Mayor of London Ken Livingstone directed the refusal of planning permission for the school, as to do so would result in a loss of Metropolitan Open Land.

Southwark Local Education Authority subsequently identified two additional nearby parcels of land to offer as alternate open space, thereby permitting the retention of some of the park, and planning permission was then granted. This was then the subject of an unsuccessful judicial review in 2003 by a local resident, Karen Lambert.

City of London Academy, Southwark opened in 2005, with the sports facilities being available for community use.

== Facilities and features ==
The park was reopened in 2007 by the Mayor of Southwark, Councillor Paul Kyriacou.

On the northern perimeter of the park are some allotments, which are managed by the Bermondsey and Rotherhithe Allotment Society.

There is a children’s playground in the centre of the park. In addition to the sports facilities at the City of London Academy, there is a MUGA (multi-use games area) which is predominantly used for basketball.

The centerpiece of the restored park is Cloud Canopy, by Southwark-based American-born sculptor Randy Klein, now known as Rafael Klein.
