= East London Theatre Archive =

The East London Theatre Archive (ELTA) is a digital theatre archive based at the University of East London, in London, England. The ELTA contains 15,000 digitised objects including images, papers, photographs and artefacts. The Joint Information Systems Committee (JISC) provided £500,000 funding to support the ELTA digitisation project.

In July 2018 the website was taken offline. As of 2020 it is still offline.

== ELTA Digitisation Project ==
The ELTA was funded by JISC to address the lack of digital resources that covered the history of theatre and music halls in East London, UK. The digitisation project undertaken by ELTA began on 24 March 2007 and was completed on 27 February 2009. The ELTA currently (2011) holds a range of theatre related digital assets that date from 1827 to the present day.
