= Rafael Klein =

British-American artist

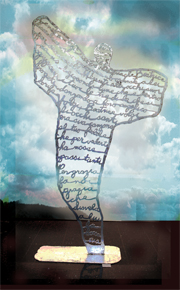
Angel of Poetry, Biblioteca Classense, Ravenna

Rafael Klein also known as Randy Klein (born 1949 New York City) is a British-American artist, living and working in London. Klein studied at the Art Students League of New York with painter Knox Martin. His work includes painting, sculpture, and artists’ books. His first major exhibition was 'Tin Temples' at 112 Greene St. in New York. He moved to London in 1984, and had his studio at the Diorama Arts. On arriving in London he became lifelong friends with the sculptor Ivor Abrahams. From 1991 - 2000 he was lecturer in Metal Sculpture at City and Islington College. He has work in private and public collections in Europe and the USA, including the Tate Gallery, the Victoria and Albert Museum, and the Museum of Modern Art.

== selected Public Commissions ==
- Angel for Edmonton, 2024, London
- Covid Memorial Sculpture, 2023, Enfield Borough Council
- Osiris, 2022 Dulwich Picture Gallery Commission for Tessa Jowell Health Centre
- Nature's Open Book, 2022, Durlston Country Park, Dorset
- Nunhead Railway Station, 2012, London
- Biblioteca Classense in Ravenna], Italy, 2008

== Criticism ==
'Klein seems to think in sculptural terms as easily and directly as the bird sings. His show of sculpture and graphics at the Accademia Italiana and European Academy is almost like a ride in Disneyland, the invention is so ebullient.’ John Russell Taylor The Times, London

'Klein tells stories pirouetting on the fine edge between detachment and sympathy.’ Cathy Courtney, Art Monthly

'Klein's book is an epic tale of creation and destruction. The structure allows us to follow a narrative and to uncover layers of meaning in a way that could not be done with any other form of art.’ Meg Duff, Tate Gallery Librarian Books by Artists

'Rafael Klein is probably best known as an artist who works across several different formats – books, painting, increasingly film, and perhaps especially sculpture. One of Rafael’s strengths is the gentleness, the tenderness of his figurative work. I feel Rafael’s work offers solace and promise – the artist is holding us by the hand, taking us through and showing how we can rise above it all.' Dr. Richard Price, Head of Contemporary British Collections, British Library
