= Krisnan Inu =

New Zealand and Samoa international rugby league footballer

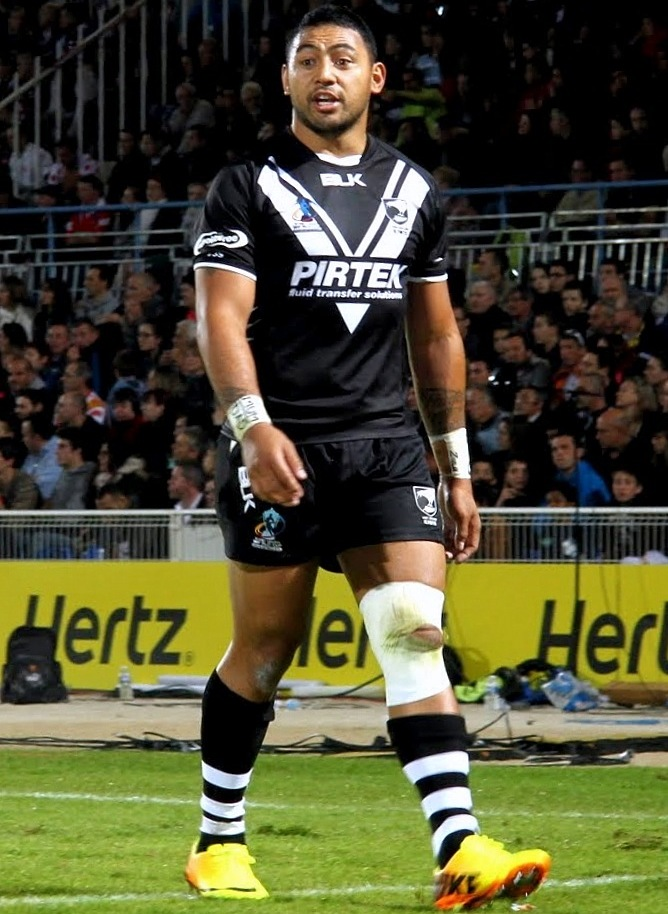

Personal information
- Full name: Krisnan Nevada Inu
- Born: 17 March 1987 (age 39) Auckland, New Zealand
- Height: 6 ft 2 in (1.87 m)
- Weight: 16 st 10 lb (106 kg)

Playing information
- Position: Centre, Wing
Club
Years	Team	Pld	T	G	FG	P
2007–10	Parramatta Eels	78	36	60	0	264
2011–12	New Zealand Warriors	21	12	0	0	48
2012–14	Canterbury Bulldogs	40	16	70	2	206
2015–17	Catalans Dragons	47	16	6	0	76
2018	Widnes Vikings	20	10	35	0	110
2019–21	Salford Red Devils	52	24	195	1	487
2022	FC Lézignan XIII	6	1	0	0	4
2022	Leigh Centurions	23	25	159	0	418
	Total	287	140	525	3	1613
Representative
Years	Team	Pld	T	G	FG	P
2007–13	New Zealand	6	1	13	0	30
2014	Samoa	1	0	6	0	12

Coaching information
Club
Years	Team	Gms	W	D	L	W%
2026	North Wales Crusaders	6	1	0	5	17

Rugby union career
- Position(s): Fullback, Wing
Senior career
Years	Team	Apps	(Points)
2014-15	Stade Français	10	(20)

Krisnan Nevada Inu (born 17 March 1987) is a professional rugby league coach who is the former head Coach of the North Wales Crusaders in the RFL Championship, and a former professional rugby league footballer.

He has played for both New Zealand and Samoa at international level.

He has previously played the Parramatta Eels, Canterbury-Bankstown Bulldogs and the New Zealand Warriors in the NRL, and the Catalans Dragons and the Widnes Vikings in the Super League. Inu is one of two players who have lost grand finals with three clubs. He was a member of the 2008 World Cup-winning New Zealand squad.

Inu has also played rugby union for Stade Français of the Top 14 competition in France.

== Background ==
Inu was born in Auckland, New Zealand, and is of Samoan descent.

== Playing career ==
=== Parramatta Eels ===
A Parramatta Eels junior, Inu made his first grade debut in the 2007 NRL season against the Canberra Raiders. After just one first grade match he was named to play for New Zealand in the ANZAC Day Test against Australia at Suncorp Stadium in Brisbane. The Kangaroos ran out easy 30–6 winners over the Kiwis. After the test, Inu was dropped back to Premier League but returned to first grade through a series of injuries to regular players. Inu took on the kicking duties as Parramatta's primary kicker and full-back, Luke Burt, was injured mid-season. In round 25 Inu scored three tries and kicked seven goals in Parramatta's 46-point win over Brisbane.

Inu played in Parramatta's 2007 preliminary final defeat by Melbourne at Docklands Stadium. In August 2008, Inu was named in the New Zealand training squad for the 2008 Rugby League World Cup, and in October 2008, he was named in the final 24-man Kiwi squad that went on to win the tournament, playing one game in their win against Papua New Guinea.

After a 2–4 start to the 2009 season, Parramatta decided to re-tool their line-up, dropping Inu to the New South Wales Cup, with Taulima Tautai replacing him for the round 7 match against the Brisbane Broncos. Inu played in the 2009 NRL Grand Final for Parramatta against the Melbourne Storm at centre. At the end of the 2010 season, Inu told coach Daniel Anderson that he would be joining The New Zealand Warriors on a two-year deal.

=== New Zealand Warriors ===
Inu played in New Zealand's 2011 NRL grand final loss to The Manly-Warringah Sea Eagles. Inu's up-and-down tenure at the Warriors was curtailed in May 2012 with his release and immediate signing with the Canterbury-Bankstown Bulldogs.

=== Canterbury-Bankstown Bulldogs ===
Inu was released by the Warriors in May 2012 so he could immediately join the Des Hasler coached Canterbury side.

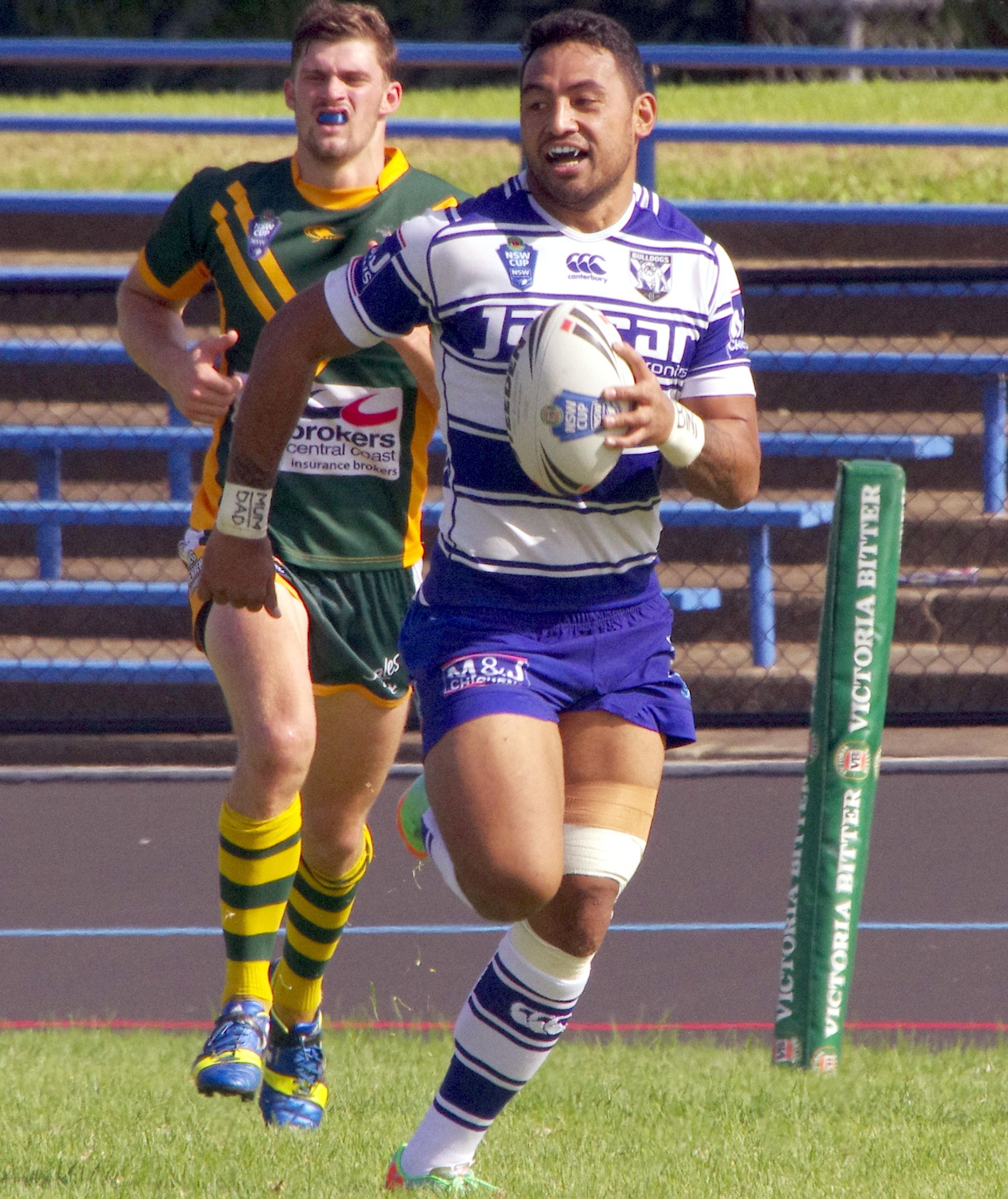
Inu playing for the Bulldogs in 2014

He signed with the Canterbury outfit until the end of the 2015 season. Inu played in the 2012 NRL Grand Final for Canterbury which they lost 14–4 against Melbourne.

=== Catalans Dragons ===
Inu returned to rugby league and was signed by Catalans Dragons in June 2015 to add depth to a depleted squad. On 17 November 2017, Inu signed a two-year deal to join The Widnes Vikings.

=== Widnes Vikings ===
On 4 April 2018, Inu broke his leg in a match against Warrington. Before the injury, Inu had scored six tries in nine games.

=== Salford Red Devils ===
On 27 March 2019, it was announced on the Salford Red Devils official website that Inu, signed a contract with immediate effect. He joined the Super League club on a deal that would see him return to the Super League after previous stints with the Catalans Dragons, and Widnes.

Inu played in the 2019 Super League Grand Final defeat by St. Helens at Old Trafford.

On 17 October 2020, Inu played in the 2020 Challenge Cup Final defeat for Salford against Leeds at Wembley Stadium.

=== FC Lézignan XIII ===
On 28 October 2021, it was reported that he had signed for FC Lézignan XIII in the Elite One Championship

=== Leigh ===
In February 2022, Inu signed a one-year deal with Leigh in the RFL Championship. On 28 May 2022, Inu played for Leigh in their 2022 RFL 1895 Cup final victory over Featherstone. On 3 July, Inu scored a hat-trick and kicked eight goals in Leigh's 56–6 victory over Bradford. On 10 July, Inu successfully kicked all eleven conversion attempts in Leigh's 66–10 victory over Workington Town. Following Leigh's promotion to the Super League, Inu announced his retirement.

== Goal kicking style ==
Inu is known for smiling and laughing before attempting a conversion at goal. This was first revealed during the 2007 NRL season. It later became his trademark and some media Sydney media outlets dubbed him "The Smiling assassin". Inu explained his reason behind this saying "It started at training, Every time I practised kicking, the first thing I'd try to do is kick from the sideline and everyone would start bagging me out and I would start laughing. It's the same when the crowd starts booing. I just start smiling and laughing. If they are going to boo me I might as well laugh about it and if I get it over it just shows them up so I can laugh even more".

== Coaching career ==
=== North Wales Crusaders ===
On 26 March 2026 it was reported that he had taken the role of head-coach for North Wales Crusaders in the RFL Championship

On 1 June 2026 the club reported that Mike Grady had taken over the head coach role.
