= Waikato rugby league team =

Sports team in New Zealand

Club information
- Full name: Waikato Rugby League Football Club
- Nickname: Cougars
- Colours: Black; Red; Yellow
- Founded: 1921
- Exited: 2009

Former details
- Grounds: Trustbank Park, Hamilton (10,000); Davies Park, Huntly
- Competition: Bartercard Premiership

Records
- Premierships: 1997
- Rugby League Cup: 1922-24, 1927, 1930, 1932, 1975-76, 1997-99

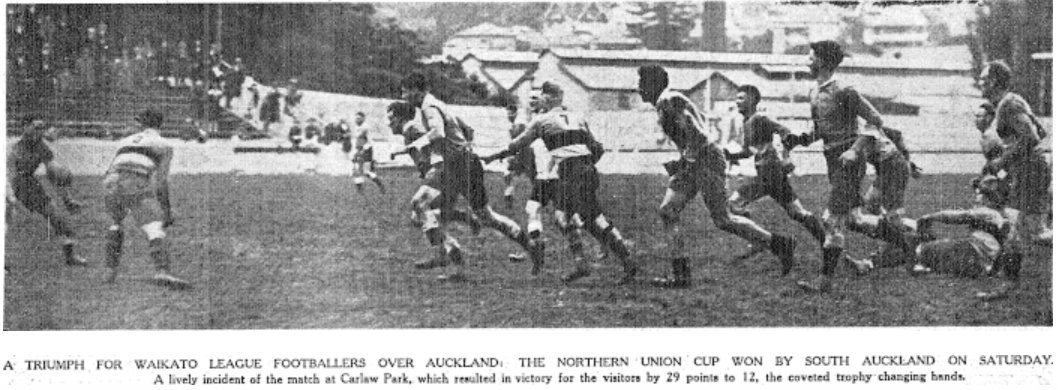
Waikato beating Auckland 29-12 at Carlaw Park on October 15, 1927.

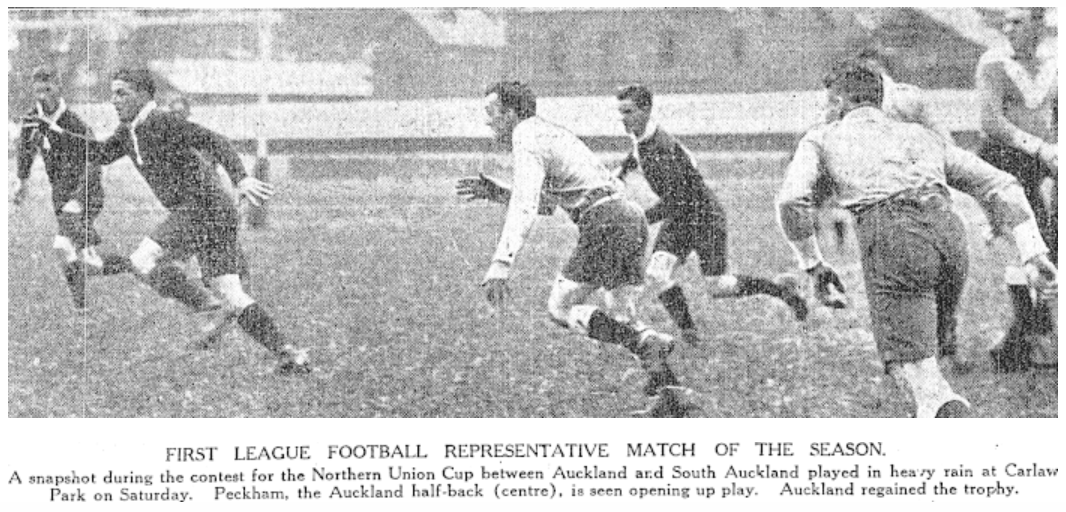
Auckland v Waikato (named South Auckland originally) in 1928 at Carlaw Park. Tim Peckham of Auckland has just passed the ball. He also represented South Auckland 10 times.

The Waikato rugby league team (also known as the Waikato Cougars, formerly as South Auckland) is a New Zealand rugby league team that represents the Waikato Rugby League in New Zealand Rugby League competitions. They competed in the Lion Red Cup from 1994 to 1996, the Super League Challenge Cup in 1997 and the Bartercard Premiership in 2008 and 2009.

== History ==
=== Lion Red Cup ===
Between 1994 and 1996, the Waikato region was represented by the Waikato Cougars in the Lion Red Cup competition. The team's inaugural captain was Tukere Barlow while Joe Gwynne was the coach. The team was originally going to be called the Stags or the Chiefs before the Cougars nickname was selected.

Notable players included; Martin Moana, Gavin Hill, Tama Hohaia, Francis Leota, Darryl Beazley, 1994 captain Tukere Barlow, Butch Tua, 1995 captain Aaron Tucker, Tony Waikato, Kiwi Mark Woods and Hekewaru Muru.

Season	Pld	W	D	L	PF	PA	PD	Pts	Position	Finals
1994	22	16	1	5	589	405	184	33	Second	Lost Elimination Semifinal
1995	22	13	1	8	471	379	92	27	Fourth	Lost Elimination Semifinal
1996	22	13	1	8	515	472	43	27	Fourth	Lost preliminary final

=== Late 1990s ===
The Waikato Cougars won the Super League Challenge Cup in 1997, defeating Canterbury in the final. During this year they also defeated Auckland at Carlaw Park for the first time since 1943 and won the Rugby League Cup. They defended the Rugby League Cup in 1998.

=== Bartercard Cup ===
The Waikato region was represented in the Bartercard Cup competition by the Waicoa Bay Stallions, a co-operative team involving players from Waikato, Coastline and Bay of Plenty federations.

Season	Pld	W	D	L	PF	PA	PD	Pts	Position	Finals
2004	16	4	2	10	380	455	-75	10	9th (12)	N/A
2005	16	3	0	13	368	620	-252	6	12th (12)	N/A
2006	18	5	2	11	494	662	-168	12	8th (10)	N/A
2007	18	5	1	12	418	682	-264	11	7th (10)	N/A

=== Bartercard Premiership ===
Waikato Rugby League were one of the six teams that compete in the National Provincial Competition in 2008 and 2009. In both years they finished third.

Season	Pld	W	D	L	PF	PA	PD	Pts	Position	Finals
2008	5	3	0	2	110	138	-28	6	Third	N/A
2009	5	3	0	2	130	108	22	6	Third	Lost semi-final

== Rugby League Tour Matches ==
Over the years Waikato has been an infrequent stop for touring international rugby league teams.

Game	Date	Result	Venue	Attendance	Notes
1	4 September 1913	New South Wales def. Waikato 20–14	Claudelands, Hamilton	1,500	1913 NSW Tour of New Zealand
2	18 September 1919	Australia def. Waikato 58–5	Steele Park, Hamilton	1,500	1919 Kangaroo tour of New Zealand
3	28 July 1924	England def. Waikato 30–12	Paterson Park, Ngāruawāhia		1924 Great Britain Lions tour
4	20 July 1960	France def. Waikato 32–2	Davies Park, Hamilton	3,071	1960 French Tour of Australasia
5	5 July 1961	Australia def. Waikato 26–8	Steele Park, Hamilton	866	1961 Kangaroo tour of New Zealand
6	25 July 1962	Great Britain def. Waikato 59–20	Davies Park, Hamilton	3,461	1962 Great Britain Lions tour
7	9 August 1964	France def. Waikato 23–16	Davies Park, Hamilton	2,737	1964 French Tour of Australasia
8	23 June 1965	Australia def. Waikato 25–4	Davies Park, Hamilton	1,800	1965 Kangaroo tour of New Zealand
9	3 August 1966	Great Britain def. Waikato 47–8	Davies Park, Hamilton	2,933	1966 Great Britain Lions tour
10	10 May 1970	NSW Country def. Waikato 22–11	Davies Park, Hamilton	3,000	
11	3 August 1976	Combined Sydney def. Waikato 41–3	Davies Park, Hamilton		
12	20 September 1983	Papua New Guinea def. Waikato 28–24	Davies Park, Hamilton		1983 Papua New Guinea Kumuls tour
13	5 July 1988	Papua New Guinea def. Waikato 38–12	Davies Park, Hamilton		1988 Papua New Guinea Kumuls tour
