= Waikato Rugby League =

Sports governing body in New Zealand

Waikato Rugby League is the local sporting body responsible for the administration of rugby league in the Waikato region of New Zealand. The WRL are represented by the Waikato rugby league team. They are currently part of the Upper Central Zone along with Coastline Rugby League and Bay of Plenty Rugby League.

== History ==
The league was constituted as the South Auckland Rugby League on 28 April 1921. In 1983, a merger between Hamilton Rugby League (the south) and Waikato Rugby League (the north), formed the Waikato Rugby Football League Incorporated; it was agreed that finals would alternate annually between Resthills and Davies Park.

== Current Teams ==
=== Premier & Premier Reserve Teams 2026 ===
- Taniwharau Rugby League (Huntly) - Davies Park
- Ngaruawahia Panthers (Ngaruawahia) - League Park
- Hamilton City Tigers (Hamilton) - Resthills Park
- Te Piringa (Hamilton) - Steele Park
- Hamilton Hornets (Hamilton) - Resthills Park
- Turangawaewae (Ngaruawahia) - Paterson Park

=== Senior A Teams 2026 ===
- Taniwharau Rugby League (Huntly) - Davies Park
- Coast Steelers (Taharoa) - Taharoa Domain
- Ngaruawahia Panthers (Ngaruawahia) - League Park
- Hamilton City Tigers (Hamilton) - Resthills Park
- Hauraki Tigers (Paeroa)
- Hamilton Hornets (Hamilton) - Resthills Park
- Turangawaewae (Ngaruawahia) - Paterson Park
- College Old Boys (Hamilton) - Resthills Park
- Whatawhata Wolves (Whatawhata)
- Te Awamutu Firehawks (Te Awamutu) - Albert Park
- Whaingaroa Whai (Raglan)

=== Women's Clubs for 2026 ===
- Taharoa - Taharoa Domain
- Turangawaewae (Ngaruawahia) - Paterson Park
- Hamilton City Tigers (Hamilton) - Resthills Park
- Ngaruawahia Panthers (Ngaruawahia) - League Park
- Taniwharau Rugby League (Huntly) - Davies Park
- Hamilton Hornets
- Rangiriri
- Te Piringa
- Hauraki Tigers
- Huntly South
- Whaingaroa Whai (Raglan)

== Dormant Clubs ==
- Whatawhata Wolves (Whatawhata)
- Huntly South Chargers (Huntly) - Davies Park
- Fairfield Falcons (Hamilton) - Swarbrick Park
- Morrinsville Bulls (Morrinsville)
- Rangiriri Eels (Maurea)
- Otorohanga Tigers (Otorohanga) - Island Reserve
- Kio Kio Hunters (Maihihi) - Kio Kio United Sports Ground
- Frankton Albions (Hamilton) - Muir Park moved to Swarbrick Park after A S Muir fell out with Waikato Rugby League.
- Ngaruawahia Lions (Ngaruawahia) - Patterson Park
- Jaradites Rugby League (Hamilton)
- Huntly United (Huntly) - Davies Park
- Cambridge Raiders (Cambridge)
- Waipa Wildcats (Kihikihi)
- Thames Wanderers (Thames/Coromandel)
- Ohinemuri Warriors
- Whaingaroa Divers (Raglan)
- Glen Afton (Glen Afton)
- Chartwell Lions

== Past Winners' Premier grades ==
Waikato club championship winners since 1986:

- 1986 - Huntly South defeated Taniwharau (Davies Park, Huntly)
- 1987 - Frankton Albions defeated Huntly South (Davies Park, Huntly)
- 1988 - Ngaruawahia Panthers defeated Hamilton City Tigers (Davies Park, Huntly)
- 1989 – Turangawaewae defeated Ngaruawahia Panthers (Davies Park, Huntly)
- 1990 - Turangawaewae def Ngaruawahia Panthers (Davies Park, Huntly)
- 1991 - Hamilton City Tigers def Ngaruawahia Panthers (Resthills Park, Hamilton)
- 1992 – Turangawaewae defeated Ngaruawahia Panthers (Davies Park, Huntly)
- 1993 - Hamilton City Tigers 50-10 Ngaruawahia Panthers (Davies Park, Huntly)
- 1994 – Turangawaewae 30-23 Hamilton City Tigers (Davies Park, Huntly)
- 1995 – Turangawaewae 20-15 Taniwharau (Resthills Park, Hamilton)
- 1996 – Turangawaewae 26-18 Taniwharau (Resthills Park, Hamilton)
- 1997 –Taniwharau defeated Turangawaewae (Davies Park, Huntly)
- 1998 - Turangawaewae 35-18 Hamilton City Tigers (Resthills Park, Hamilton)
- 1999 - Turangawaewae 32-22 Hukanui(Davies Park, Huntly)
- 2000 - Turangawaewae defeated Hamilton City Tigers (Davies Park, Huntly)
- 2001 - Hukanui defeated Turangawaewae (Davies Park, Huntly)

Between 2002 and 2007 Waikato aligned itself with Coastlines and the Bay of Plenty to create the Waicoa Bay Championship:

- 2002 –Taniwharau defeated Turangawaewae (Davies Park, Huntly)
- 2003 – Turangawaewae defeated Taniwharau (Davies Park, Huntly)
- 2004 – Ngongotaha defeated Ngaruawahia Panthers (Puketewhero Park, Rotorua)
- 2005 – Turangawaewae defeated Hamilton City Tigers (Davies Park, Huntly)
- 2006 - Turangawaewae defeated Taniwharau (Davies Park, Huntly)
- 2007 –Taniwharau 24-18 Turangawaewae (Davies Park, Huntly)
- 2008 -Taniwharau 40-4 Otumoetai Eels (Davies Park, Huntly)

The Waikato club championship resumed in 2009

- 2009 - Taniwharau 16 - 2 Ngaruawahia Panthers (Davies Park, Huntly)
- 2010 – Hamilton City Tigers 19-12 Taniwharau (Resthills Park, Hamilton)
- 2011- Ngaruawahia Panthers 24-4 Hamilton City Tigers (Davies Park, Huntly)
- 2012 - Hamilton City Tigers 34-4 Taniwharau (Davies Park, Huntly)

WaiCoa Bays Championship resumed in 2011:

- 2011- Hamilton City Tigers 26-6 Taniwharau (Resthills Park, Hamilton)
- 2012 - Hamilton City Tigers 26-12 Ngaruwahia Panthers (Davies Park, Huntly)

Bay of Plenty Clubs break away from the competition, Leaving it as The "WaiCoa Championship"

- 2013 – Taniwharau 18-16 Hamilton City Tigers (Resthills Park, Hamilton)
- 2014 – Taniwharau 20-18 Otumoetai Eels (Davies Park, Huntly)

The Waikato club championship resumed in 2015:

- 2015 - Hamilton City Tigers 33 - 12 Taniwharau (Davies Park, Huntly)

WaiCoa Bays Championship resumed in 2016:

- 2016 - Hamilton City Tigers 24 - 19 Pacific (Resthills Park, Hamilton)

The Waikato Club Championship resumed in 2017:

- 2017 - Taniwharau 16 - 14 Hamilton City Tigers (Davies Park, Huntly)
- 2018 - Taniwharau 28 - 12 College Old Boys (Davies Park, Huntly)
- 2019 - Taniwharau 28 - 22 College Old Boys (Resthills Park, Hamilton)
- 2020 -
- 2021 -
- 2022 -
- 2023 -
- 2024 - Resthills Park
  - Men's Premiership: Taniwharau Rugby League 26 - 12 Ngaruawahia Panthers (Resthills Park)
  - Men's Championship: Taniwharau Rugby League 18 - 12 Hauraki Tigers (Resthills Park)
- 2025 - Davies Park
  - Women's Premiership: Taniwharau 30 - 10 Turangawaewae
  - Women's Championship: Ngaruawahia Panthers 22 - 18 Whaingaroa Whai
  - Men's Senior A: Turangawaewae 12 - 10 Taharoa Steelers
  - Men's Championship: Hamilton City Tigers 22 - 20 Taniwharau
  - Men's Premiership: Ngaruawahia Panthers 16 - 8 Taniwharau
- 2026 - Davies Park
  - Women's Championship: Turangawaewae
  - Women's Premiership: Taharoa Steelers
  - Men's Senior A: Taharoa Steelers
  - Men's Premiership Reserve: Turangawaewae
  - Men's Premiership: Ngaruawahia Panthers
- 2027
  - Women's Championship:
  - Women's Premiership:
  - Men's Senior A:
  - Men's Premiership Reserve:
  - Men's Premiership:

== National Competitions ==
The Waikato rugby league team has competed in New Zealand Rugby League competitions, notably the Lion Red Cup as The Waikato Cougars and Bartercard Premiership. They were represented in the Bartercard Cup by the Waicoa Bay Stallions a team that represented Waikato, Coastlines and Bay of Plenty.

== Notable Players ==
- Brad Clark – (Huntly South) Melbourne Storm, Canterbury Bulldogs, Penrith Panthers, NZ Māori
- Tawera Nikau – (Rangiriri Eels) *Kiwis, NZ Māori, Castleford, Cronulla Sharks, Melbourne Storm
- Wairangi Koopu - (Taniwharau) *Kiwis, NZ Māori, NZ Warriors, Melbourne Storm
- Tukere Barlow – (Hamilton City Tigers) NZ Māori, Warrington Wolves
- Martin Moana - (Huntly South) *Kiwis, NZ Warriors, Halifax
- Lance Hohaia - (Taniwharau) *Kiwis, NZ Warriors, Kiwis Rugby League World Champion 2008, Saint Helens
- Sam Rapira – (Hukanui) *Kiwis, NZ Warriors, Kiwis Rugby League World Champion 2008
- Steve Rapira – (Hukanui) NZ Warriors Juniors 2008, North Queensland Cowboys, NZ Warriors
- Kurt Kara – (Turangawaewae) NZ Warriors Juniors 08' 09', Newtown Jets
- Herewini Rangi – (Taniwharau) NZ Warriors 2004, Wynnum Manly Seagulls, Australian Bush Footy
- Aoterangi Herangi – (Turangawaewae) NZ Warriors 2004, Wynnum Manly Seagulls
- Jesse Royal – (Turangawaewae, Ngaruawahia Panthers) Penrith Panthers, Newcastle Knights, NZ Warriors
- Tainui Raihe – (Taniwharau, Hamilton City Tigers) NZ Māori, Waikato 1998-2000
- Hekewaru Muru - (Turangawaewae) NZ Māori, Waikato Rugby League
- Shaun Kenny-Dowall - (Turangawaewae, Ngaruawahia Panthers) *Kiwis, NZ Māori, Waikato Rugby League, Sydney Roosters, NRL All Stars
- Isaac John – (Turangawaewae, Pacific Sharks) NZ Warriors, Penrith Panthers
- Sam Perrett – (College Old Boys) Sydney Roosters, Bulldogs, NZ Māori, NZ Kiwis
- Zoram Watene - (College Old Boys) Penrith Panthers u/20s 2007, Winsor Wolves 2009-2012, Auckland Vulcans 2013
- Malakai Watene-Zelezniak - (College Old Boys) Penrith Panthers u/20s 2008, Windsor Wolves 2011, Auckland Vulcans 2013
- Dallin Watene-Zelezniak - (College Old Boys) Penrith Panthers u/20s 2013, NSW u18s 2013, Australian Schoolboys 2013
- Louis Anderson – (Taniwharau) NZ Warriors, Kiwis 2004-06, Tonga
- Donavan Briggs - (Hamilton City Tigers) Cronulla Sharks u/18s 2015/2016 New Zealand Kiwis u/16s 2014
- Harlan Lawrence Rawiri Collins – (Taniwharau) Manly Sea Eagles u/20s, 2015
- Dylan Rintoul – (College Old Boys) Canterbury Bulldogs u/20s 2013
- Te Maire Martin - (Turangawaewae)

West Tigers u/20s 2014/2015, Penrith Panthers 2016

- Morgan Harper - (Ngaruawahia Panthers) Manly-Warringah Sea Eagles
- Austin Dias – (Turangawaewae) West Tigers
