= Taniwharau Rugby League Club =

Rugby club based in Huntly, New Zealand

Club information
- Colours: Green and gold
- Founded: 1944

Current details
- Ground(s): Waahi Pa (Kumara Patch); Davies Park
- Coach: Premier Coach: Ray Barchard & Jay Rapana Premier Reserve Coach: Jordan Muru
- Competition: Waikato Rugby League and WaiCoa Competition

Records
- Premierships: 14
- Waicoa Bay Premierships: 2002, 2007

The Taniwharau Rugby League Club is a rugby league club from Huntly, New Zealand. They compete in the Waikato Rugby League and WaiCoa club competitions. The club plays in a green and gold strip and are based at Waahi Pa in Huntly.

== History ==
Taniwharau was founded in 1944 by Tonga Mahuta. It is the most successful club in Huntly, a town which once boasted four rugby league clubs – the Rangiriri Eels, Huntly South, Huntly United and Taniwharau.

The club won 11 straight Waikato premierships in the 1970s and 1980s. They won the inaugural Waicoa Bay championship in 2002 and 2007. They were unbeaten in 2007, a feat that had never before been achieved at the Waikato Rugby League Premier Level. Taniwharau won the reformed Waikato Rugby League title in 2008 and 2009.

== Notable players ==
- Lance Hohaia (New Zealand International)
- Wairangi Koopu (New Zealand international)
- Herewini Rangi (New Zealand Warriors player)
- Andy Berryman (New Zealand international)
- Steve Berryman (Cook Islands international)
- Don Parkinson (New Zealand international)
- Rick Muru (New Zealand international)
- Austin Dias (Wests Tigers Player)
