= Stadium Taranaki =

New Zealand rugby stadium

- 'The Bull Ring' 'The Fish Bowl'
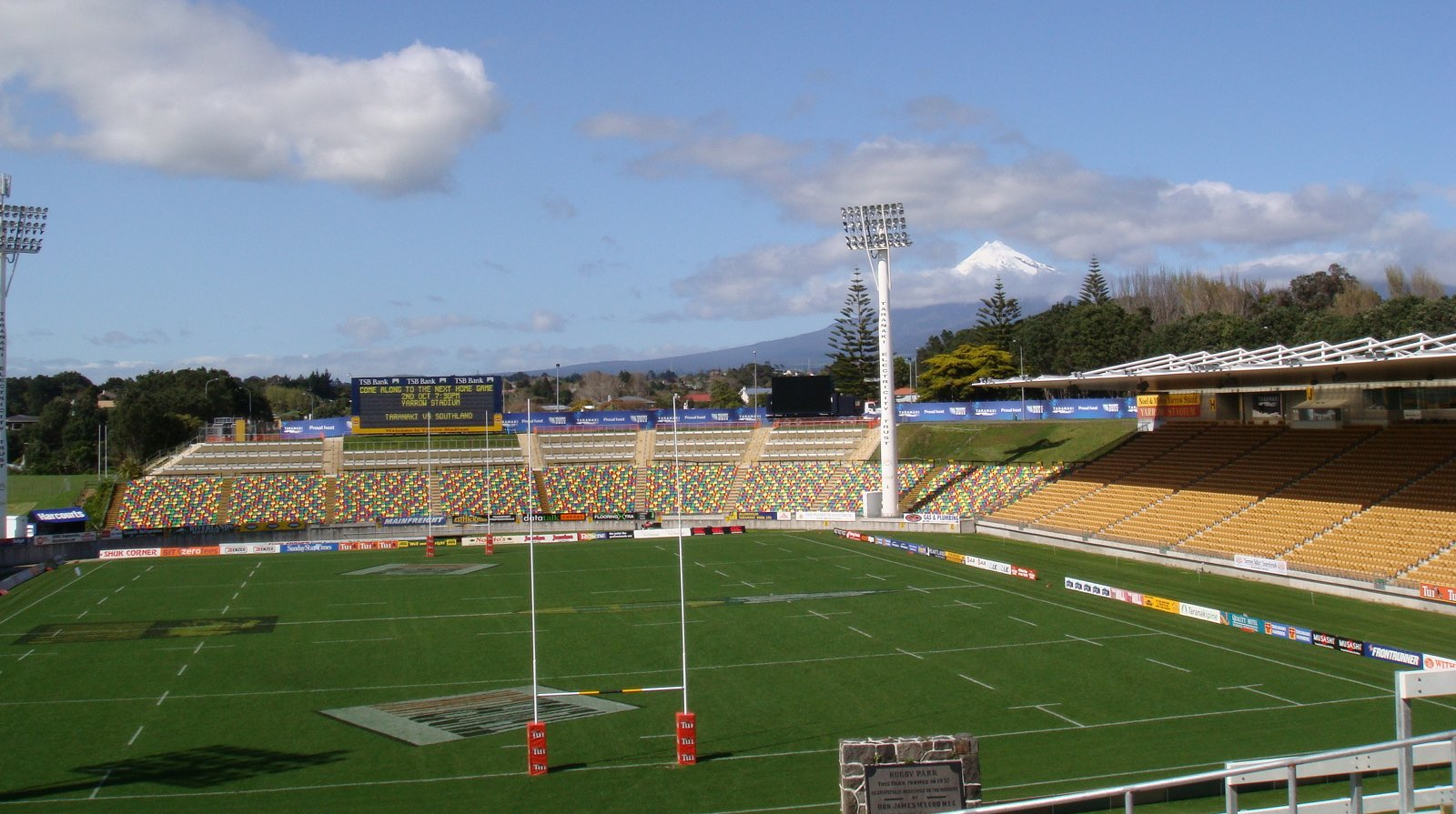
- Interactive map of Stadium Taranaki
- Full name: Stadium Taranaki
- Former names: Rugby Park, Yarrow Stadium
- Location: New Plymouth, New Zealand
- Coordinates: 39°4′13″S 174°3′54″E
- Capacity: 30,000 (30,345 with standing room)
- Surface: Grass with sand base
- Scoreboard: Located at the southern end of the ground

Construction
- Groundbreaking: January 1931
- Built: 10 June 1947 (Renovated 18 July 2002)
- Opened: August 1972
- Cost: NZ$15 million
- Architect: Warren and Mahoney

Tenants
- Chiefs (Super Rugby); Hurricanes (Super Rugby) (1996-2013); Taranaki Rugby Football Union (ITM Cup); Team Taranaki (Central Premier League); Taranaki Sharks (NZRL); Central Districts Stags (NZC)

Stadium Taranaki is a sports stadium in New Plymouth, in the Taranaki Region of New Zealand.

The stadium is situated in the central suburb of Westown. Named the third best rugby stadium on earth by New Zealand Rugby World magazine in May 2009, the stadium conforms with the International Rugby Board's "clean stadium" policy.

The stadium was originally simply known as Rugby Park, and was known through much of the early 2000s as Yarrow Stadium. In February 2025, stadium sponsors Yarrows the Bakers announced they were not going to renew their naming rights agreement, which had been in place since August 2002.

The primary tenant of this 25,000-capacity stadium is the Taranaki Rugby Football Union which has a representative team playing in the country's principal rugby union competition, the National Provincial Championship. Since 2013, the stadium has played host to the Chiefs team as part of a new alliance, after Taranaki cut their ties with the Wellington-based Hurricanes.

The venue was first developed as a rugby ground in 1931, with the first stadium completed in 1947. Further stands were built at the same end and older ones demolished. Four floodlight towers were built in 1998 to hold night events. A major redevelopment saw two new grandstands added and considerable modernisation in 2002, and further enhancements to the venue were completed in 2010, raising the capacity to more than 25,500 for the 2011 Rugby World Cup and other fixtures.

The stadium was a personal legacy of the late Noel Yarrow, a pioneering Taranaki baker and businessman, and active philanthropist. Noel was a passionate rugby supporter, and the major grandstand overlooking the field's western sideline is a tribute to his support.

The east stand was deemed earthquake prone in November 2017 with the west stand being ruled out of action in June 2018. Rugby was played at the venue in 2018 and 2019 but spectators had to watch matches from the ends, while a grandstand was erected in front of the east stand. Temporary infrastructure was bought into cater for the changes as changing facilities and corporate areas were off limits.

In May 2019 owners, the Taranaki Regional Council, made a decision to repair and refurbish both grandstands in order for both stands to comply with earthquake regulations. The Taranaki Rugby Football Union and a catering company moved to alternative locations.

It was announced in November 2020, that the East Stand would be demolished and replaced by a similar sized stand, but with extra facilities at the back to house events without opening the entire stand. The contract to repair the West Stand was awarded to Clelands Construction in December 2020 and involves major earthquake strengthening works including improvements to ground stability, foundation tiebacks and new steel beams. The roof of the West Stand will remain intact while the bleachers and seating are removed to gain access to the ground below. The west stand was the first to be completed in 2023, while the east stand was opened in April 2025, which holds less than its previous.

== Venue description ==
- Stadium Taranaki has four sports fields, the Legends Lounge, concourse and a variety of function rooms.
- The turf on the main field is laid over irrigation lines and drains on a sand profile.
- The main field has two grandstands providing undercover seating, terraced and embankment uncovered seating and standing areas.
- The stadium also has a full sound system, fully electronic scoreboard and floodlights.
- Fields one, two and three have training level floodlighting. Field two is behind the Eastern Stand (TSB STAND), field three and four are behind the scoreboard on the southern end of the ground.
- Car parks are situated behind the TSB Bank (eastern side).
- It was announced in 2009 that Stadium Taranaki was to have a $1.5 million upgrade for the 2011 Rugby World Cup. An extra two thousand or so seats were added on the end embankments, and media facilities were improved.

== Legends Lounge ==
The Legends Lounge is on the top floor of the TSB Bank Stand and has panoramic views of both playing arenas and the back fields. It is used for business conferences, dinners, sales presentations and meetings, and has a capacity of 300 seated and 650 standing - these figures could change once the new east stand opens.

Features

- Internal speaker system
- Power
- Data points
- Portable stage
- Staircase and lift access is at each end of the lounge with direct access to the seating deck.
- Two kitchens, bar and toilet facilities are located at each end of the lounge so that the area can be partitioned for smaller functions.

Additional corporate boxes are being built at the top of the western stand on either side of the media area.

== Players/Media area ==
- As the main stand is currently closed, temporary facilities were built in the southeastern compound which can accommodate two teams, match officials, medical personnel with two smaller changing rooms. These are built to Super Rugby standard.
- Ordinarily, two main change rooms, each with a connecting warm-up room, are located at ground level of the TSB Bank Stand. Five subsidiary changing rooms are located at ground level of the TSB Bank Stand for other teams and referees.
- A medical room, drug testing room, media interview room and match day office are all located adjacent to the main changing room at the ground level of the TSB Bank Stand. Also located at Stadium Taranaki is the HQ of the Taranaki Rugby Football Union (TRFU). Their officers and a gym are located in the northern end of the TSB Bank Stand.
- Media: There are media facilities in the western grandstand, "Noel and Melva Yarrow Stand". There is a camera lounge on halfway with four adjacent media boxes for television, radio, additional commentary and television match official/third umpire usage. Other media boxes for extra commentary were built next to the primary boxes prior to 2011 for additional commentary. Scaffolding platforms are temporarily built for cameras during cricket coverage at both ends of the ground. Extra media areas for print media and non-rights holders have an area at the top of the TSB Stand side. Broadcast parking (broadcast compound) is behind the western grandstand.
- The big screen is located at the top of the southern embankment. An additional screen is brought in by the TSB Community Trust if required.

== Events ==
In the past Stadium Taranaki has hosted Relay for Life, Multi-ethnic Extravaganza and Searchlight Tattoo. Yarrow's has also hosted a number of cricket matches including the Central Districts when they clashed with Sri Lanka. Cricket is usually played at Pukekura Park, because of the incorrect size of Stadium Taranaki's number 1 field. However Stadium Taranaki hosted many matches in the New Zealand domestic Twenty20 cricket competition in the 2015/16 summer the first time in 14 years using a drop in pitch.

In February 2007 about 8000 people attended the Crusty Demons Kiwi Carnage Tour show at Stadium Taranaki to watch the 12-strong team of Kiwi, Australian, and American motorcycle riders perform back-flips and stunts known as the "rock solid" and the "ruler".

In March 2009 the Crusty Demons Unleashed Hell Tour stopped in at Stadium Taranaki and put on a show for the approximately 6500 people who attended the event. Stunts performed by the six riders included the dangerous double back-flip.

Postponed by 24 hours due to rain, the Nitro Circus team made up of around 30 motocross, BMX, FMX, inline skaters and scooter athletes performed at Stadium Taranaki on 12 February 2017. Using a range of different sized ramps, including the 15 metre high Gigantor Ramp, the riders launched themselves into the air on everything from motorbikes and scooters to a couch and a whisky barrel.

Members of the crowd were also called onto the field to take part in the show, with three volunteers jumping on a single motorbike with one of the Nitro riders to perform a back flip, while another went down the ramp on another guy's back.

== Rugby ==
- Seven test matches (2008-)
- 17 Super Rugby Matches: Hurricanes (1996–2013); Chiefs (2014-)
- Taranaki rugby games in both the ITM Cup and its predecessor, the National Provincial Championship, including 2014 ITM Cup final

Record
Date	Team No. 1	Res.	Team No. 2	Sport	Attendance	Notes
Internationals
2000-06-17	(Māori people) New Zealand Māori	18–15	Scotland	Rugby union	–	2000 Scotland tour
2003-06-09	(Māori people) New Zealand Māori	9–23	England	Rugby union	20,000	2003 England tour
2006-06-17	Samoa	53–9	Japan	Rugby union	4,200	2006 IRB Pacific 5 Nations
2006-06-17	(New Zealand) Junior All Blacks	38–10	Tonga	Rugby union	4,200	2006 IRB Pacific 5 Nations
2008-09-03	New Zealand	101–14	Samoa	Rugby union	22,518	2008 Samoa tour
2010-06-12	New Zealand	66–28	Ireland	Rugby union	25,064	2010 Ireland tour
2011-09-11	Ireland	22–10	United States	Rugby union	20,823	2011 Rugby World Cup Pool C match
2011-09-15	Russia	6–13	United States	Rugby union	13,931	2011 Rugby World Cup Pool C match
2011-09-26	Wales	81–7	Namibia	Rugby union	13,710	2011 Rugby World Cup Pool D match
2013-06-22	New Zealand	24–9	France	Rugby union	23,300	2013 France tour
NRL
2005-02-13	New Zealand Warriors	20–10	Parramatta Eels	Rugby league	9,500	2005 NRL pre-season
2016-05-21	New Zealand Warriors	12–38	Canberra Raiders	Rugby league	12,833	2016 NRL season round 9
Historic
1950-07-08	Taranaki	3–25	British Lions	Rugby union	–	1950 British Lions tour
1959-08-08	Taranaki	3–15	British Lions	Rugby union	–	1959 British Lions tour
1966-07-02	Taranaki	9–12	British Lions	Rugby union	–	1966 British Lions tour
1971-07-03	Taranaki	9–14	British Lions	Rugby union	–	1971 British Lions tour
1977-05-28	Taranaki	13–21	British Lions	Rugby union	–	1977 British Lions tour
1993-06-16	Taranaki	25–49	British Lions	Rugby union	–	1993 British Lions tour
2005-06-08	Taranaki	14–36	British & Irish Lions	Rugby union	22,000	2005 British & Irish Lions tour
2008-10-12	All Golds	44–10	New Zealand Māori	Rugby league	–	2008 Rugby League World Cup pre-season
2014-10-25	Taranaki	36–32	Tasman	Rugby union	21,000	2014 ITM Cup premiership final

== IRB Rugby World Cup 2011 ==
Stadium Taranaki, as Stadium Taranaki was temporarily renamed for the World Cup, hosted three matches during the pool play stage of the 2011 Rugby World Cup:

Date	Team No. 1	Res.	Team No. 2	Round	Attendance
2011-09-11	Ireland	22–10	United States	Pool C	20,823
2011-09-15	Russia	6–13	United States	Pool C	13,931
2011-09-26	Wales	81–7	Namibia	Pool D	13,710

== Cricket ==
While Pukekura Park is the traditional cricket venue in New Plymouth, Stadium Taranaki held matches over the years. It hosted two first-class one-day matches before its major development, completed in 2002 when Central Districts hosted Wellington in 1998 then Otago a year later. Central Districts returned in the summer of 2003 to play Wellington before a one-day match against Sri Lanka in 2004, despite the smaller boundaries. All four matches were under lights. In 2015, the stadium was used to host the final and semi-finals of the Georgie Pie Super Smash matches along with Pukekura Park. There were a handful of matches scheduled at the stadium for the 2016/17 season.

== Rugby League ==
For a single match, Stadium Taranaki acted as the home ground for the New Zealand Warriors as they played against the Canberra Raiders in the National Rugby League competition on 21 May 2016. Captained by Ryan Hoffman, the Warriors trailed the Raiders 20–0 at halftime eventually losing to the away team 38–12. More than 12,000 people turned up to watch the game and also hometown hero, Hāwera's own Issac Luke. The Warriors scored two tries to the Raider's six.

== Football ==
Referred to as Stadium Taranaki for the 2015 FIFA U-20 World Cup, the venue played host to Group E and the Brazil v Uruguay match in the Round of 16 knockout round.

The Wellington Phoenix played against the Western Sydney Wanderers at Stadium Taranaki on Saturday 4 February 2017. With just 40 percent of the possession the Wanderers beat a 10-man Phoenix team 3–1 in their round 18 A-League match in New Plymouth. Goal scorers for the Wanderers were Brendon Santalab (2) and Nicolás Martínez, and Shane Smeltz for the Phoenix.

== Redevelopment ==
=== Capacity ===
In 2002, work on a $17m redevelopment of the park was completed with ground capacity believed to be 25,000. But while 22,500 crammed in for the All Blacks match against Manu Samoa in 2008, the game revealed the stadium could safely hold just 17,000.

Heavy rain or other problems during the match could have resulted in safety issues for people sitting at either end of the ground. Council re-evaluations of the stadium's capacity showed that to meet self-imposed health and safety standards the stadium could hold only 17,000 people. The region's World Cup bid and future ability to attract top games such as another All Blacks test meant a greater capacity was needed.

The upgrade plans included levelling out the northern grass bank to make grass terraces with standing room for 8500 people, up from the estimated 1,500. At the southern end of the ground, 3,200 plastic shell seats replaced the concrete seating underneath the scoreboard. At both the northern and southern ends of the field, concrete walls were removed and the crowd area brought back down to ground level just six metres from the dead-ball line. Additional broadcast media facilities were installed next to existing media boxes. Print media and non-rights holder positions are based in tribunes at the rear of the TSB Bank Stand.
