= 1911 Auckland Rugby League season =

The 1911 Auckland Rugby League season was the second full organised club season in Auckland following the 1910 Auckland Rugby League season. City Rovers won the title again after winning it in the competitions inaugural year.

Preceded by 1910	3rd Auckland Rugby League season 1911	Succeeded by 1912

The club season commenced on 20 May, with the start of the competition for the Myers Cup. City Rovers were crowned champions after defeating Ponsonby United in the final 36–15 which was required due to both teams being within 2 points of each other as the competition entered its closing stages. The competition at the time and for decades to come often did not complete full round robins. When a team held an unassailable lead over their nearest rivals, the competition was often concluded at that point. Ponsonby and City had already met twice during the season, but rather than ending the round-robin with round 10—when Ponsonby would have had a bye and City likely would have had an easy win over wooden spooners Eden Ramblers—the Auckland Rugby League decided to have the two top teams play off for the title a week early, rather than prolong the competition.

The City side featured Albert Asher, Alex Stanaway, Jim Rukutai, and Bob Mitchell, while Ponsonby had Charlie Savory, Charles Dunning and Arthur Carlaw.

== Auckland Rugby League news ==
=== Club teams and grade participation ===
Team	1st Grade	2nd Grade	3rd Grade	Total
North Shore Albions	1	1	1	3
City Rovers	1	1	1	3
Ponsonby United	1	1	0	2
Eden Ramblers	1	0	1	2
Northcote & Birkenhead Ramblers	0	1	1	2
Newton Rangers	1	0	0	1
Total	5	4	4	13

=== Reminiscing about the league's formative years ===
In 1941 at the annual meeting the chairman of the league in 1911 (Mr. Barry Brigham) spoke about the league in its formative years. He said "the seeds sown by the pioneers have developed in a wonderful way... when we first started playing, the matches were at Victoria Park. “For funds, we used to go around with a hat. Then we started taking boxes around, and if at the end of the day we were ‘shy,’ we had to have a tarpaulin just to pay for the ground,” he recalled. He went on to say, “Plenty of mud was thrown at us in those times, and we had to face a good deal of hostility. Our first meetings were held in the cellar of the Rob Roy Hotel, and then we gained use of the social room in the same hotel. From there, we drifted to other rooms, and eventually to a home of our own.” He also talked of venues and said "at one time the league had a lease of Eden Park at £100 a year, and from there they shifted to Victoria Park, where on one occasion they had a £300 gate, a figure that was not beaten until the 1924 season at Carlaw Park.

=== Venues ===
Unlike in 1910 when only two venues were used, there were 5 venues used. They were Victoria Park, Takapuna Racecourse, 'Avondale', Auckland Domain, and Eden Park (which was the venue for the club final between City Rovers and Ponsonby United).

=== Eden Ramblers formed ===
The senior competition saw the addition of the Eden Ramblers who had been formed in April. A meeting was held at the Avondale Public Hall on Wednesday 26 April with Mr John Bollard, MP presiding over it. He was elected president and chairman, and the name Eden Ramblers was chosen along with the colours or green and gold. The following officers were selected: Hon Secretary, Mr B Boone; Management Committee, W. A. Cummings, J Eddoes, W Fairweather, M Morrow, and J Denyer. The membership was close to 50 and they were to begin their training for the season ahead on 29 April with a joint practice with Ponsonby United at Victoria Park.

=== Rugby union converts ===
At the start of the season George Gillett, Arthur Francis, Alan Blakey, and Frank Morse all switched codes. Gillett and Francis had both played for the All Blacks for several seasons and were joining the Newton Rangers along with Blakey who was a well known Auckland rugby player. Morse was joining the City Rovers. Gillett, Francis, and Morse would all go on to represent the Kiwi's.

=== Representative season ===
It featured a representative programme in August and September where Auckland played nine matches including two against the New Zealand side. They won eight and lost one. Their first match saw them lose to New Zealand however they rattled off consecutive wins against New Zealand (6 weeks later), Wellington, Lower Waikato, Hawke's Bay, Nelson, Taranaki, Hawke's Bay Māori, and a Country team from Waihi & Rotorua.

=== Myers Cup (first grade championship) ===
Eighteen regular season matches were played before the final on 16 September where City Rovers defeated Ponsonby United 36 to 15 to retain the title which they had won in 1910.

== First Grade competition ==
=== Statistics ===
A total of 19 first-grade games were played, resulting in 132 tries, 60 conversions, and 11 penalties. The average number of points per game was 28.4, with 6.95 tries per game. With 60 successful conversions from 132 attempts, the success rate was 45.5%. All of these figures represented significant increases from the previous season, when 10 fewer points were scored per game.

=== Myers Cup standings ===
Team	Pld	W	D	L	F	A	Pts
City Rovers	8	7	0	1	164	70	14
Ponsonby United	9	7	0	2	205	117	14
North Shore Albions	7	3	0	4	80	68	6
Newton Rangers	7	1	0	6	51	138	2
Eden Ramblers	7	1	0	6	42	149	2

The second round did not feature the final round of matches hence Ponsonby playing an extra match (when they were due to have a bye), while the table also includes the final played between City and Ponsonby.

=== Myers Cup results ===
==== Round 1 ====
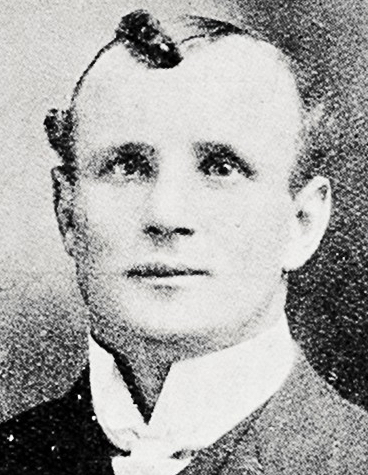
Charles Savory

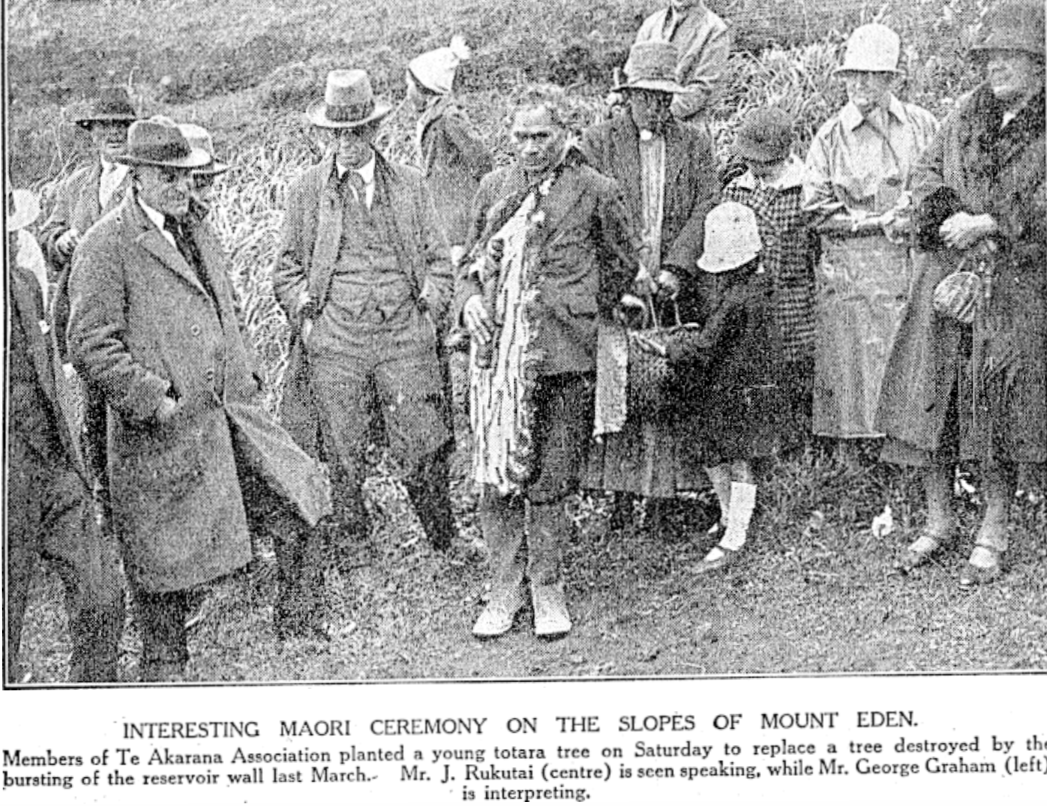
Jim Rukutai in 1929.

Charles Savory had switched from the Ponsonby rugby union club to the Ponsonby rugby league side and made his debut, scoring a try in their 19-3 win. He was a controversial figure, going on to represent New Zealand and also Australia on their 1911-12 tour of Great Britain as one of four New Zealanders chosen to tour with the side. In 1913 he was found guilty of kicking and suspended for life though the NZRL quashed the conviction. In 1914 he won the National Amateur Heavyweight Boxing championship. Savory went away to fight in World War 1 but was tragically killed at Gallipoli in 1915. For City Jim Rukutai scored two tries in their 13-3 win after having joined the side late the previous season. William Moeki scored a try on debut for City. He enlisted in the war effort and was killed in action at Gallipoli on April 25, 1915. Hec Wynyard was knocked out playing for North Shore with play stopping for some time.

20 May	Ponsonby	19–3	Newton	Victoria park
	Try: Charlie Savory, Sydney Cole, Charles Dillimore, Sid Riley 2 Con: Sydney Cole 2		Try: Sainsbury	Referee: Ernest Jaggs

20 May	City	13–3	North Shore	Victoria Park
	Try: William Moeki, Jim Rukutai 2 Con: Alex Stanaway 2		Try: Tom Haddon	Referee: W Pitts

==== Round 2 ====
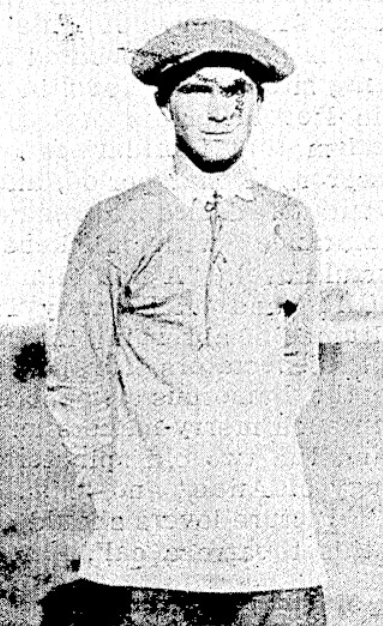
Don Kenealy

Don Kenealy made his debut for the Eden Ramblers against Ponsonby. He would go on to become their only New Zealand representative, playing 4 matches for New Zealand in 1912. After the Eden club, which was based in the Avondale/Pt Chevalier areas folded in 1913 he moved to the City Rovers for the 1913-15 seasons before retiring aged just 22 as he soon left for World War 1 before returning and marrying in 1917.

27 May	City	16–3	Newton	Takapuna Racecourse
	Try: Frank Morse 2, Sid Kean, George Harrison; Con: Frank Morse; Pen: Albert Asher		Try: Arthur Francis	Referee: Bob Oliphant

27 May	Ponsonby	49–10	Eden	Victoria Park
	Try: William Cossey, Harry Fricker, Charles Dunning 2, Charles Savory, Ronald MacDonald, + 5 unattributed tries Con: Charles Dillamore, Sydney Cole 3, + 4 unattributed conversions		Try: Harris, + 1 unattributed try Con: Brett, + 1 unattributed conversion	Referee: W Pitts

==== Round 3 ====
For the North Shore side Stan Weston was on debut. He scored a try as did other New Zealand internationals Jim Griffen, and George Seagar all scored tries while Alfred Jackson kicked one of their conversions. Weston's younger brother Lyn Weston played rugby union for New Zealand. The match between City and Ponsonby at Victoria Park drew a crowd of 2,000.

3 June	Ponsonby	30–11	City	Victoria Park
	Try: A Nicholson, Henry Bettis, Charles Savory 2, Arthur Carlaw, Scotchy McDonald, Samuel Houghton, Alf Chorley; Con: Sydney Cole 2, Charles Dillimore		Try: William Moeki, Albert Asher, Frank Morse; Con: Frank Morse	Attendance: 2,000; Referee: Bob Oliphant

3 June	North Shore	30–6	Eden	Takapuna Racecourse
3:00	Try: Jim Griffen 2, George Seagar 3, Fraser, Frederick Gladding, Stan Weston; Con: Frederick Gladding, Alfred Jackson; Pen: Winders		Try: Don Kenealy, J Cummings	Referee: Ernest Jaggs

==== Round 4 ====
In the match between Newton and Eden one of the three tries was unattributed but it was said that the try scorers were Short and Linkhorn so one of those players scored twice but it is unknown which. The North Shore fullback Weri Puki had to leave the field due to an injury to his face, while team mate Stan Weston had to go off with a sprained ankle.

17 June	Newton	13–8	Eden	Victoria Park
3:00	Try: Short (1 or 2), Charles Linkhorn (1 or 2); Con: Joe Bennett 2		Try: Harris 2 Pen: Don Kenealy	Referee: C Morran

17 June	Ponsonby	22–6	North Shore	Takapuna Racecourse
3:00	Try: Charles Dillimore 3, Arthur Carlaw, Nicholson, Harry Fricker; Con: J McGregor 2		Try: Ernie Bailey, Jim Griffen	Referee: Bob Oliphant

==== Round 5 ====
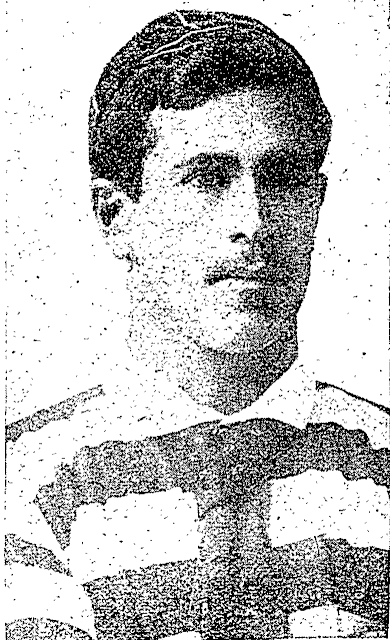
Albert Asher

In the City match with Eden, Albert Asher was tackled by four opponents and held down. J Simpson, the City fullback took exception and after the referee had blown his whistle to stop play, Simpson struck an Eden player and was sent off. The crowd was agitated by the incidents and play had to be stopped for several minutes until the field was cleared of them. The Takapuna Racecourse was in a poor state. Something which had been commented on in previous matches. While the venue was considered a great one to view matches from it was only drawing small crowds with the argument being that it was relatively difficult to get to with a boat needed to reach Devonport and then either a bus or 15 minute walk to reach the ground. Stan Walters scored 2 tries for North Shore after debuting for them weeks earlier. He would go on to play 62 games for them as well as representing Auckland 16 times, and New Zealand 31 times before moving into the Waikato region and playing for Hamilton and Waikato in the 1920's.

24 June	City	20–4	Eden	Victoria Park
	Try: E Robinson, Albert Asher, Julian, George Hunt; Con: Albert Asher 3 Pen: Albert Asher		Pen: Don Kenealy 2	Referee: T Cunningham

24 June	North Shore	17–2	Newton	Takapuna Racecourse
	Try: Frederick Gladding, Stan Walters 2, Ernie Bailey, Alfred Jackson; Con: Jim Griffen		Pen: Joe Bennett	Referee: W Pitts

==== Round 6 ====
1 July	North Shore	3–11	City	Takapuna Racecourse
	Try: Frederick Gladding		Try: E Robinson 2, Phillips; Con: Albert Asher	Referee: Bob Oliphant

1 July	Ponsonby	32–13	Newton	Victoria Park
	Try: Charles Dillimore 2, Arthur Carlaw 2, Sid Riley, Sam Houghton; Con: Charles Dillimore 3, Sydney Cole 2 Pen: Charles Dillimore (mark)		Try: Joe Bennett 3 Con: Joe Bennett 2	Referee: E R Harker

==== Round 7 ====
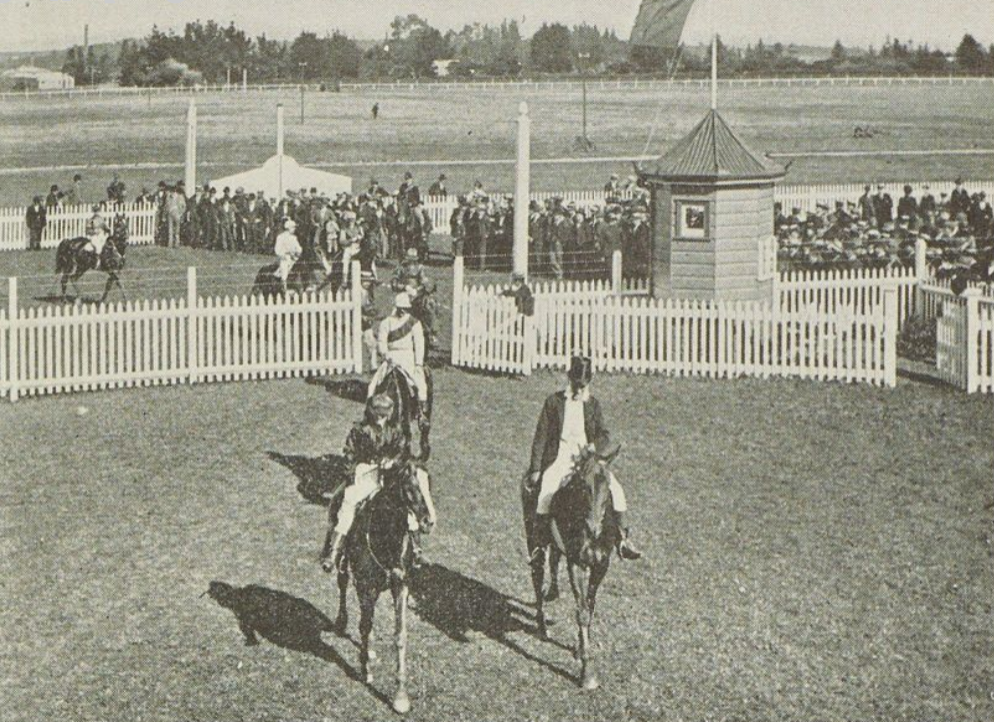
Avondale Racecourse in 1902. The playing fields were located on the infield, mainly to the left.

The match between Ponsonby and Eden was played on the Avondale Racecourse. The sports fields were located at the eastern end of the racecourse grounds. Eden took the field with just 10 players and played the entire match with that number.

8 July	City	32–12	Newton	Victoria Park
3:00	Try: J.S. Wilson, Albert Asher, Harold Denize 2, Harry Childs, Bob Mitchell, Phillips, G Warner; Con: Albert Asher 4		Try: Marshall, Len Farrant; Con: Len Farrant; Pen: Joe Bennett 2	Referee: Bob Oliphant

8 July	Ponsonby	24–0	Eden	Avondale Racecourse
	Try: Samuel Houghton, Charles Dillimore 3, Arthur Carlaw, Henry Bettis; Con: Samuel Houghton, Arthur Carlaw, Sydney Cole			Referee: T. Cunningham

==== Round 8 ====
In the match between City and Ponsonby at the Takapuna Racecourse there were several injuries. The field was still in poor condition. George Harrison (City) sprained an ankle, George Hunt (City) ruptured the muscles of his shoulder, and Warner (City) had his nose "severely injured in a collision with Arthur Carlaw (Ponsonby) who was partly stunned and sustained a cut to his forehead". The Eden v Newton match saw 500 spectators turn up to the Domain but the match was described as "never at any time bright or interesting", though forward, Frederick Gladding was singled out for playing very well on the Newton side.

15 July	City	25–0	Ponsonby	Takapuna Racecourse
3:00	Try: William Moeki, George Hunt 2, Bob Mitchell, E Robinson, Phillips 2 Con: Albert Asher, Phillips			Referee: Bob Oliphant

15 July	North Shore	8–0	Eden	Auckland Domain
3:00	Try: Farquharson, Stan Walters; Con: Frederick Gladding			Attendance: 500; Referee: E.R. Harker

==== Round 9 ====
The Takapuna Racecourse ground was "in a shocking condition with mud and water, and all the players were plastered with filth at the end of the game". Though the game itself was interesting with North Shore attacking at the end but failing to overcome Ponsonby who held on to win 14-13. Samuel Houghton suffered internal injuries during the match for Ponsonby and was said to be ruled out for the remainder of the season however he was able to play in the senior final on September 16, 2 months later. Eden managed the first senior win in their history but it was against a Newton side that played 3 men short the entire game.

22 July	Ponsonby	14–13	North Shore	Takapuna Racecourse
3:00	Try: Arthur Carlaw 2, Charles Dillimore, Henry Bettis; Con: Sydney Cole		Try: Stan Walters, William Wynyard, Billy Harrison; Con: Frederick Gladding; Pen: Frederick Gladding	Referee: T Cunningham

22 July	Eden	14–5	Newton	Auckland Domain
	Try: Don Kenealy, Harris 2, W Fairweather; Pen: Don Kenealy		Try: Little; Con: Len Farrant	Referee: Moran

==== Final ====
The final was played to raise money for charity and was staged at Eden Park for the first time in the season. Both teams were particularly strong featuring several players who had missed most of the club season owing to being in Australia with the New Zealand side. City won easily 36 to 15 after leading 23-5 at halftime before Ponsonby threatened to make a game of it with some early second half points getting back to 23-15. For City internationals Jim Rukutai, Albert Asher, Bob Mitchell, Alex Stanaway all scoring tries and Albert Asher kicking 6 conversions. For the losers Charles Dunning scored twice. At one point in the second half R.W. Roope of Ponsonby struck an opponent and was sent off. The Ponsonby team was going to leave the field but after some discussion decided to play on.

16 September	City	36–15	Ponsonby	Eden Park
3:00	Try: Jim Rukutai 2, Albert Asher, Bob Mitchell 2, Alex Stanaway, William Moeki, George Hunt; Con: Albert Asher 6		Try: Charles Dunning 2, T Wilson; Con: Sydney Cole 3	Referee: C Morran

=== Top point scorers and try scorers ===
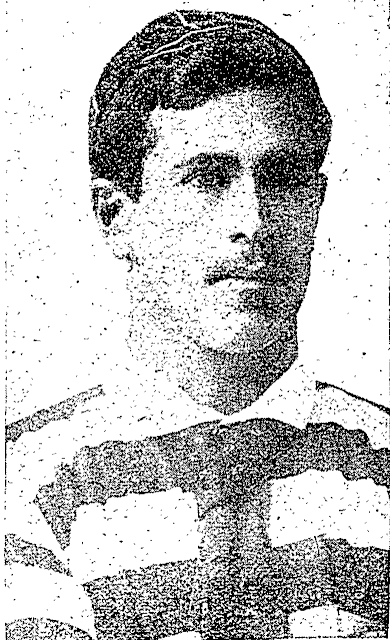
Albert Asher

The Ponsonby v Eden match in Round 2 had 23 unattributed points for Ponsonby (5 tries and 4 goals) and 5 for Eden (1 try and 1 goal), while the Round 4 match between Newton and Eden saw a try to Newton unattributed. As such the following lists are likely to omit tries and points for players from those sides. Albert Asher played the full season for City while his brother Ernie Asher traveled to Australia to play for New Zealand. Albert, while in the later stages of his career still played consistently well for City and kicked 6 goals from 8 attempts in the final against Ponsonby. Charles Dillimore scored 10 tries for Ponsonby in their wing.

Top point scorers
No	Player	Team	Games	T	C	P	Pts
1	Albert Asher	City	8	4	15	2	46
2	Charles Dillimore	Ponsonby	7	10	5	1	42
3	Sydney Cole	Ponsonby	8	1	14	0	31
4	Arthur Carlaw	Ponsonby	7	7	2	1	27
5	Joe Bennett	Newton	7	3	4	3	23
6	Frederick Gladding	North Shore	7	3	3	1	17
7	Harris	Eden	7	5	0	0	15

Top try scorers
No	Player	Team	Games	Tries
1	Charles Dillimore	Ponsonby	7	10
2	Arthur Carlaw	Ponsonby	7	7
3	Harris	Eden	7	5
4	Charlie Savory	Ponsonby	3	4
4	Albert Asher	City	8	4
4	Charles Dunning	Ponsonby	4	4
4	George Hunt	City	6	4
4	Bob Mitchell	City	6	4
4	William Moeki	City	7	4
4	Phillips	City	4	4
4	E Robinson	City	8	4
4	Jim Rukutai	City	4	4
4	Stan Walters	North Shore	5	4

== Lower grades ==
A junior representative match was played between A and B teams as curtain-raiser to the New Zealand v Auckland match at Takapuna Racecourse on July 29. Harry Oakley and Frederick Gladding had been appointed selectors for the junior representative matches. The match featured Edward Vincent Fox who the Fox Memorial Shield would later be named after. The teams were; A team: Liversidge (Ponsonby), A Hawthorne (City), Herrick (Northcote), Keen (Ponsonby), Edward Fox (North Shore), Sceates (Northcote), Jackson (Northcote), A Gault (City), Jordan (Northcote), Boswell (Ponsonby), Hynes (North Shore), Stanaway (Ponsonby), Pugh (Northcote). B Team: Sergeant (Northcote), Ridings (North Shore), Schofield (Ponsonby), Conaghan (North Shore), Neil (Northcote), Gerrard (North Shore), Brown (Ponsonby), Buchanan (North Shore), Vic Barchard (City), Fairweather (Northcote), Young (North Shore), Davies (Ponsonby), McCullagh (City). Emergencies: Young (Ponsonby), Otto, Jonas, Leaity, and Tickner. The match was played in heavy rain and resulted in a 6-all draw.

=== Second Grade standings ===
The results are incomplete. There were 10 rounds played but only 11 of the 20 results were reported.

Team	Pld	W	D	L	F	A	Pts
Northcote & Birkenhead Ramblers	7	7	0	0	64	35	14
Ponsonby United	5	2	0	3	25	23	4
North Shore Albions	4	1	0	3	30	35	2
City Rovers	6	1	0	5	21	47	2

=== Third Grade standings ===
The results are incomplete. There were 9 rounds played but only 9 results were reported out of 18 matches. Ponsonby initially entered a team in the third grade but failed to play a game before withdrawing.

Team	Pld	W	D	L	F	A	Pts
North Shore Albions	4	4	0	0	66	9	8
Eden Ramblers	5	2	0	3	41	45	4
Northcote & Birkenhead Ramblers	3	1	0	2	17	20	2
City Rovers	4	1	0	3	5	55	2

== Representative season ==
The season began with a match against the New Zealand team which was about to depart for its Australian tour. The touring side won by two points but when they returned from their tour they played again only this time Auckland were the victors by 11 points to 3.

=== Auckland v New Zealand (10 June) ===
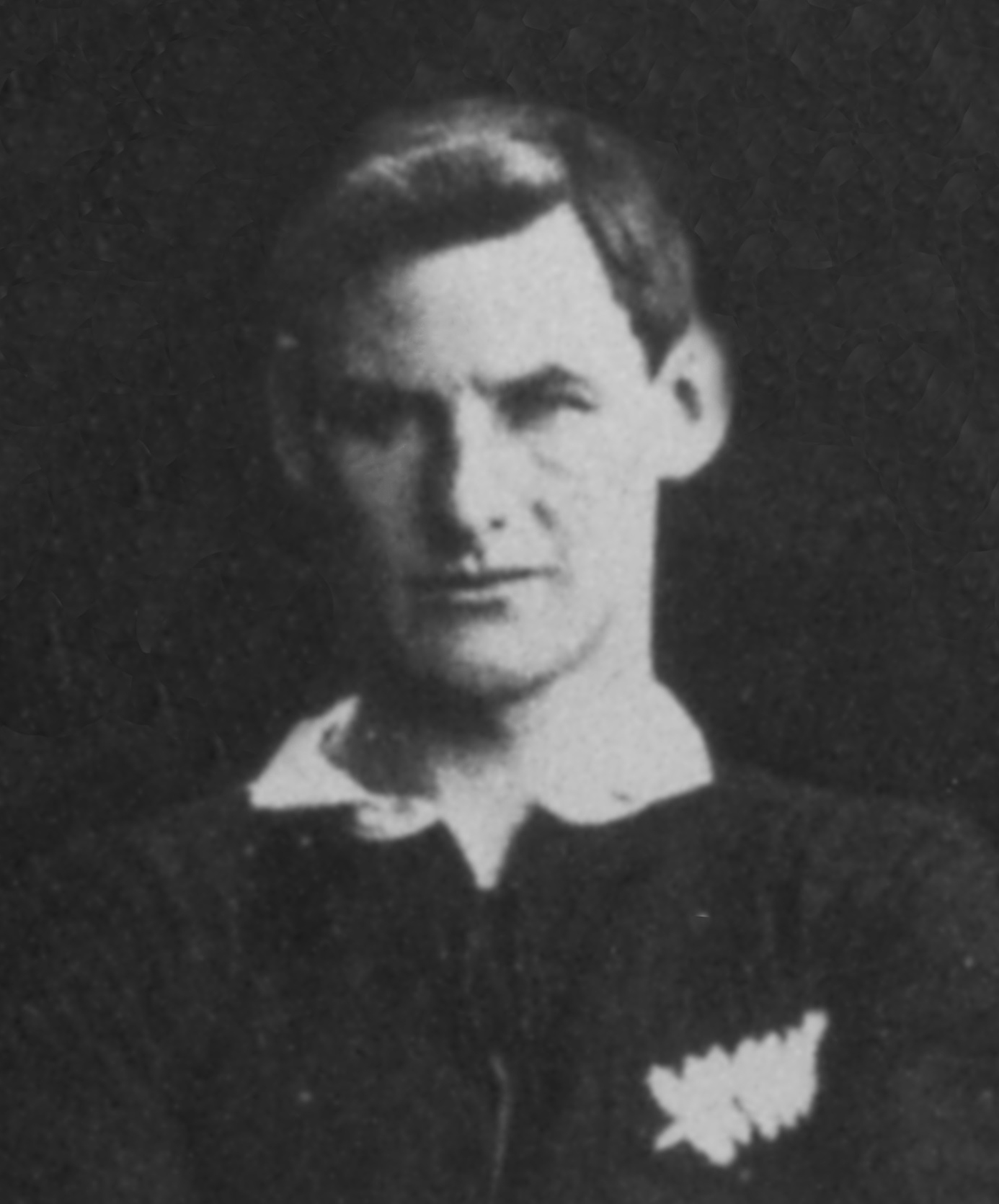
Arthur Francis from the Newton Rangers club who played for New Zealand and kicked two conversions.

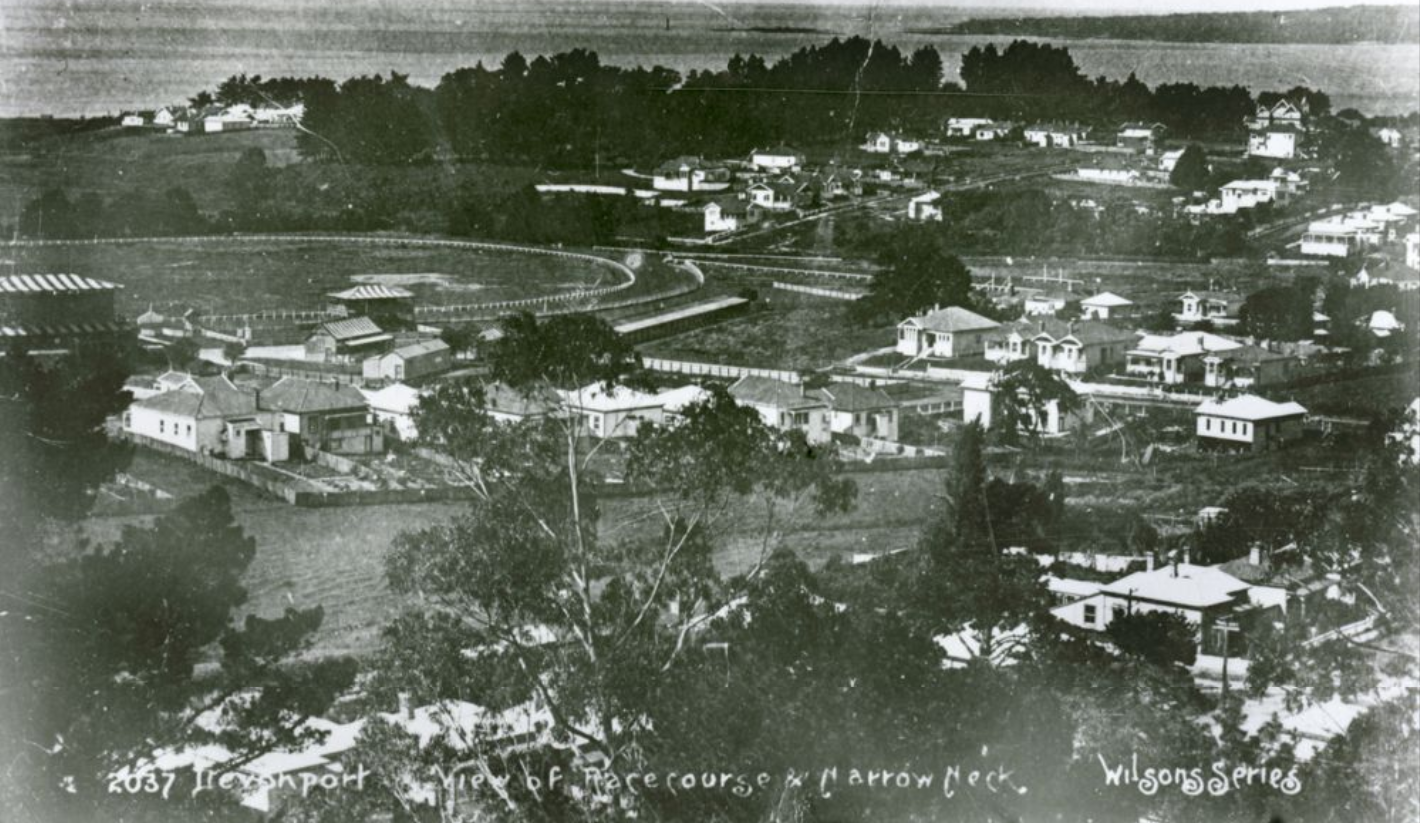
Takapuna Racecourse to the left photographed in 1910

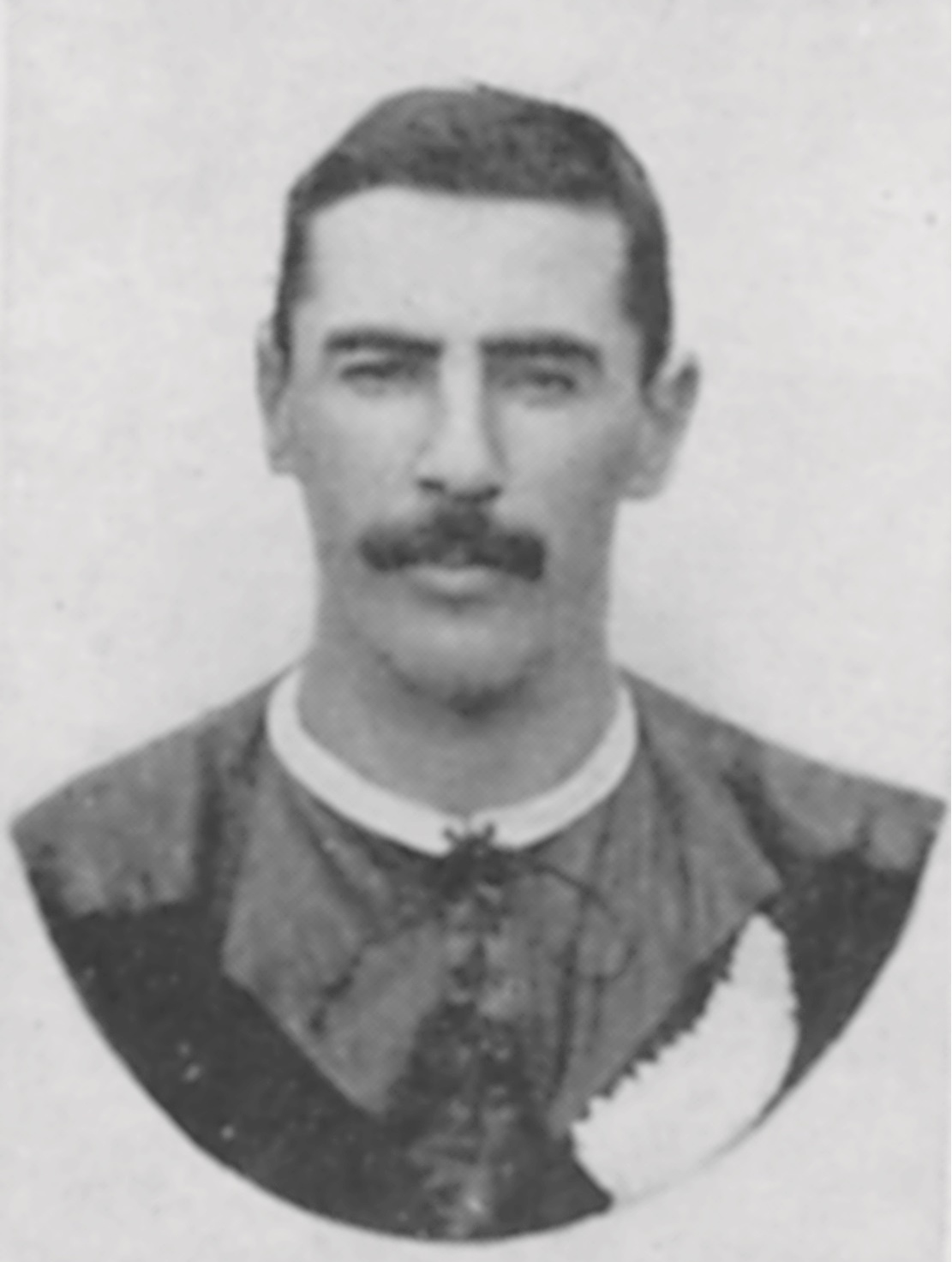
George A. Gillett

The match was played as a 'practise match' for the New Zealand team who was about to embark on their tour of Australia. There was a good attendance but heavy rain fell at two o'clock which "greatly affected the attendance, the city people being reluctant to journey to Takapuna in such conditions". Charles Savory kicked off for New Zealand with Auckland playing east to west with the sun in their eyes. The play was even and moved up and down the field for some time. Eventually Dave Mason (Rawiri Meihana), the big Nelson player got through the scrum and took play into Auckland's end and Ernie Buckland was given the ball and beat two men to score close to the posts with Arthur Francis converting. After play resumed New Zealand were getting the better of the scrums and put pressure on Auckland but they were holding up well and managed to work their way down field at one point and when on the New Zealand line Jim Griffen picked up from a scrum and threw the ball out to Arthur Carlaw but he was pushed over the sideline. Play moved back to halfway before Auckland sent it back through Charles Linkhorn and then George Smith and Roy Siddells sent it back the other way. From a scrum Auckland got the ball up field through a kick by Harry Fricker and Carlaw and Joe Bennett followed well shifting play to the corner and Fricker got across from a scramble but Bennett's conversion attempt missed. New Zealand attacked strongly and Bennett had to force in goal and then Auckland had to dot he same shortly after. Buckland came close to scoring for New Zealand but knocked on. Some kicking took place and twice the ball went over the Auckland line but they forced each time. Eventually the New Zealand forwards got the ball on their feet and sent it out to the corner but could not score and halftime came with the national side ahead 5-3. After the resumption Auckland attacked for a few minutes and Stan Weston gained good ground through a kick and then Bennett picked the ball up and scored to put them ahead, though Sam Houghton missed the conversion. New Zealand made a strong effort to regain the lead and George A. Gillett who had moved up from the full back position into the three quarters, along with Mason, and Frank Woodward were prominent. Auckland took a mark and Carlaw relieved with a kick. Then Bennett started a rush and Carlaw following gained good ground then a few seconds later George Harrison and E. Robinson had a chance to score with Alfred Jackson sending the ball to the wing and the pair passed back and forth before Harrison got through and scored between the posts with Sydney Cole converting. "Fast and furious play followed" and Gillett was heavily involved and then Savory broke through and went over the line but was tackled and the ball went loose and was forced by Auckland. New Zealand continued to attack and Mason managed to score but Francis missed the conversion. New Zealand were dominating on attack but Auckland occasionally managed to take play back to the centre of the field. Finally Roy Siddells got the ball away from a scrum and scored with Francis kicking a good goal to give them a 13-11 lead. Auckland however weren't done with and with Griffen prominent the ball was taken to New Zealand's 25 yard line and Linkhorn dribbled the ball and Bennett picked up and forced his way over to give Auckland a 14-13 lead, though the extra points were missed. There were now just five minutes left and Auckland was defending hard, having to force the ball twice then Gillett "who with an almost superhuman effort dashed at the defenders, and leaping high attempted to jump across. He got high on the backs of the Auckland forwards, and at one stage was standing upright on the shoulders of an Auckland man. From this height he fell with the ball, and had scored the winning points". Francis failed with the kick but the game ended a few seconds later with New Zealand ahead 16-14.

10 June	Auckland	14–16 (3-5)	New Zealand	Takapuna Racecourse
3:00	Try: George Harrison, Harry Fricker, Joe Bennett 2 Con: Sydney Cole 1/1, Sam Houghton 0/1, Harry Fricker 0/1, Joe Bennett 0/1		Try: George Gillett, Roy Siddells, Ernie Buckland, Dave Mason; Con: Arthur Francis 2/4	Referee: Bob Oliphant

Team details

FB	1	Alf Chorley
WG	2	Stan Weston
CE	3	E Robinson
CE	4	Sam Houghton
WG	5	George Harrison
FE	6	Arthur Carlaw
HB	7	Alfred Jackson
PR	8	Harry Fricker
HK	9	Joe Bennett
PR	10	Jim Griffen
SR	11	Sydney Cole
SR	12	Charles Linkhorn
LF	13	J Cummings

FB	1	George A. Gillett
WG	2	Roy Siddells
CE	3	Reg Sprague
CE	4	Frank Woodward
WG	5	Ernie Buckland
FE	6	Frank Morse
HB	7	George Smith
PR	8	Tom Cotterill
HK	9	Dave Mason
PR	10	Charles Savory
SR	11	Arthur Francis
SR	12	Charles Dunning
LF	13	Bert Feary

=== Auckland v New Zealand (29 July) ===
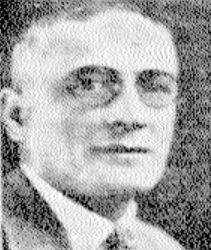
Ernie Asher, the fullback for the New Zealand side was up against his brother Albert. Both were members of the City Rovers club.

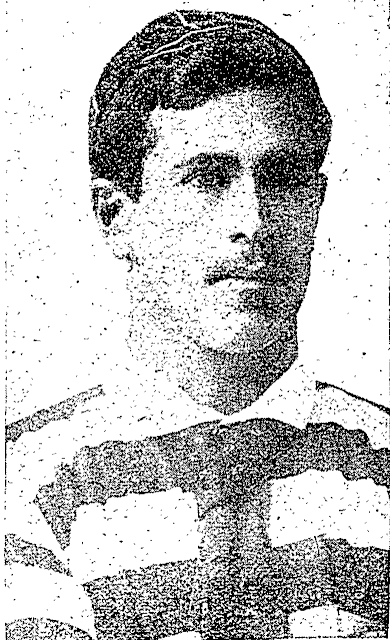
Albert Asher

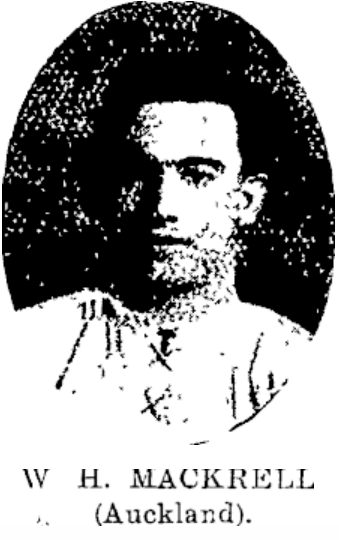
William Mackrell

The New Zealand team had returned from their tour of Australia where they played eight matches, winning four and losing four. Due to unavailability there were three players in the New Zealand side to play Auckland who did not tour with them, namely Alan Blakey, Harold (Roy) Denize, and William (Bill) Mackrell. Denize was replacing Dave Mason (Rawiri Meihana) and Mackrell was replacing Bert Feary. While Charles Linkhorn came on as a replacement for Barney Winder who was injured making a tackle. Heavy showers set in prior to the game and when the players took to the field it was described as a "quagmire" and only around 500 spectators braved the conditions. Albert Asher won the toss for Auckland and after the New Zealand team performed the haka Charles Dunning, who was captaining the side, kicked off against a "stiff breeze". He made a mess of the kick after slipping and a scrum was ordered on halfway. Ronald MacDonald, the New Zealand halfback took the ball from the scrum but his pass was intercepted by Auckland back John Kay from Ngāruawāhia, "who sent a speculative kick right up the field, and galloping in a sensational manner, fell on the ball as it crossed the line" and Auckland had the lead a minute into the game. Asher's conversion attempt missed. From the kickoff the Auckland forwards forced New Zealand up the field and the ball was kicked over their try line but Ernie Asher at full back managed to force before Arthur Carlaw could fall on it. Auckland attacked again and Harry Childs sent the ball to Albert Asher but he was well tackled by Ernie Buckland and the ball went out 25 yards from the line. Auckland persisted with the ball and Harry Fricker was "prominent in dribbling across the paddock to near the blacks' line". From a scrum Barney Winder relieved with a kick but Auckland returned once more before George Seagar in the New Zealand loose forwards "put in some pretty dribbling" and play moved into Auckland territory for the first time in the match. Play moved back and forwards mostly through kicking then after a passing rush by New Zealand was ruined by Alan Blakey passing wildly Auckland was able to kick the ball the length of the field using the wind. Buckland raced Jim Griffen for the ball and the New Zealand winger was too fast and forced. Ernie Asher then beat two defenders but Dunning "collared" him however Auckland were having the better of the game and Charles Dillamore got a clean run in and scored in the corner, but Joe Bennett missed the conversion. Considering the state of the ground it was said that "the Auckland backs were playing with remarkable combination and accuracy". They repeatedly set themselves going but only the difficult footing stopped them from "dodging". Winder who was playing well for New Zealand "got a heavy bump on the face, and had to retire", being replaced by Charles Linkhorn. New Zealand had to force once more and then the rain came down heavily again and the frequent falls into the mud by the players "kept the spectators amused". Bennett made a run down the sideline but just in the corner he was forced out. Two further times New Zealand forced behind and from the second kick in Dillamore ran up the line and a while later Bennett missed a free kick when he took the kick as a drop kick in the muddy conditions. New Zealand had a turn on attack and got to the try line but Cunning was penalised for an infringement. Robinson, the Auckland centre who was "playing a fine game" picked up cleanly, and with Dillamore's assistance transferred play to centre where he was sent out by Ernie Asher. Auckland attacked strongly again but Mackrell relieved with a "neat kick" and took play to Auckland's line. Then MacDonald, playing half back for New Zealand got the ball out cleverly and they put in a fine passing bout with the ball going to Roy Siddells, to Blakey, and Buckland and "amidst a burst of applause the latter player got across" for New Zealand's try just on halftime with Alex Stanaway (Ariki Haira) missing the extra points. Due to the conditions the teams turned around and restarted in a minute. The New Zealand side attacked quickly but were penalised and from a scrum Alfred Jackson kicked well up field. New Zealand were winning most of the scrums and gradually forced their way into Auckland's territory. Jackson got out to Carlaw who sent it to Robinson who could not gather the ball, and Frank Morse and Seagar took play back to Auckland's half. More errors and kicking shifted play around the field for some time. Eventually "Auckland livened up in a remarkable manner, and two clever passing rushes were defeated just on New Zealand's line". They kept the pressure on and Kay crossed but it was pulled back for a knock on, then seconds later Bennett dribbled close to the posts and Stan Walters got across to score and Asher extended the lead to 11-3 with his conversion. There were only ten minutes remaining now and New Zealand made some big efforts to score but Auckland held them out well and their good fitness saw them finish the game with a "determined attack" and the game ended with the 'local' side winning 11-3.

29 July	Auckland	11–3 (6-3)	New Zealand	Takapuna Racecourse
3:00	Try: John Kay, Arthur Carlaw, Stan Walters; Con: Albert Asher 1/2, Joe Bennett 0/1; Pen: Joe Bennett 0/1		Try: Ernie Buckland; Con: Alex Stanaway 0/1	Attendance: 500; Referee: Bob Oliphant

Team details

FB	1	Harry Childs
WG	2	Albert Asher (captain)
CE	3	E Robinson
CE	4	John Kay
WG	5	Charles Dillamore
FE	6	Arthur Carlaw
HB	7	Alfred Jackson
PR	8	Jim Griffen
HK	9	Stan Walters
PR	10	Joe Bennett
SR	11	Harry Fricker
SR	12	J O'Sullivan
LF	13	Bob Mitchell

FB	1	Ernie Asher
WG	2	Ernie Buckland
CE	3	Roy Siddells
CE	4	Alan Blakey
WG	5	Barney Winder
FE	6	Frank Morse
HB	7	Ronald MacDonald
PR	8	Charles Dunning (captain)
HK	9	Jim Rukutai
PR	10	Alex Stanaway
SR	11	George Seagar
SR	12	Harold (Roy) Denize
LF	13	William (Roy) Mackrell

=== Auckland v Wellington (Northern Union Cup) ===
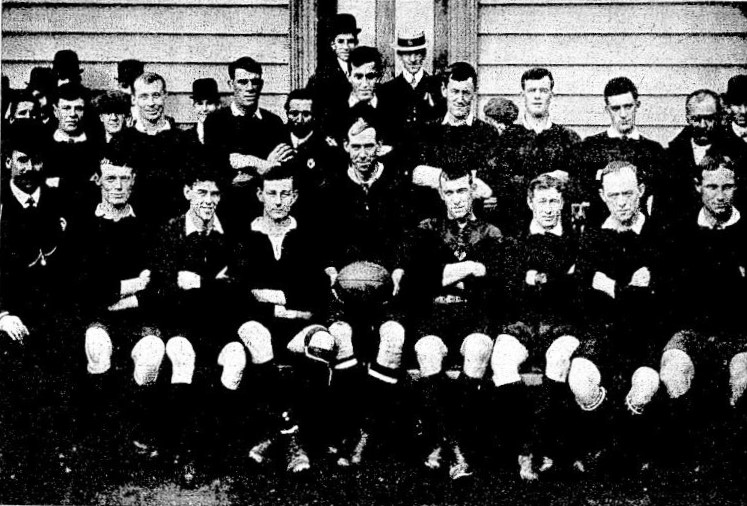
Wellington team

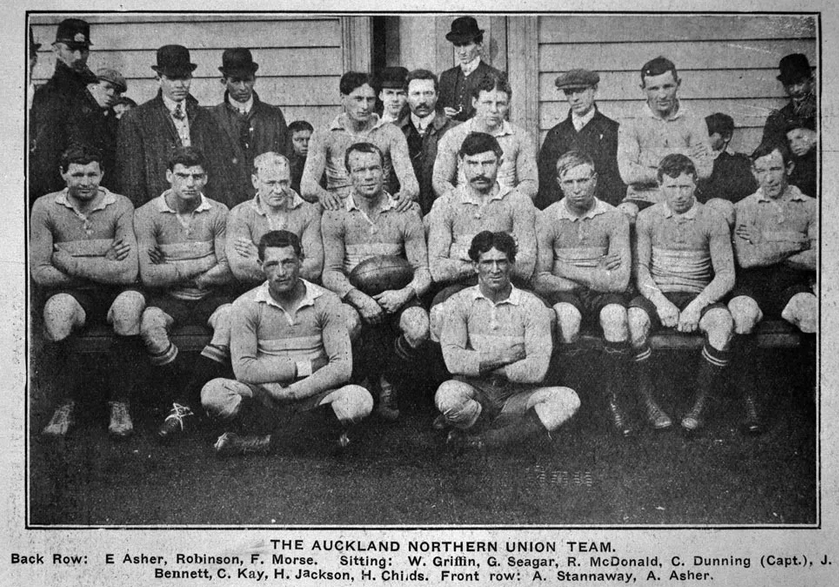
Auckland team to play Wellington.

The match was in competition for the Northern Union Cup which later became known as the Rugby League Cup. Ronald (Scotty) McDonald broke his leg during the match. Arthur Seeling of the Wellington team also badly injured his knee. The Wellington team was supposed to travel by boat back to Wellington but decided to go by train so they could drop Seeling off in Whanganui where he lived. Frank Morse debuted for Auckland from the City Rovers club. Jim Rukutai who was initially listed to play didn't in fact take the field and Alex Stanaway took his place. Unfortunately bad weather once again arrived and from one o'clock it drizzled up until the start of the game but the Victoria Park ground was still in good condition though a "trifle slippery" and there was no wind. Charles Dunning the Auckland captain won the toss and Wellington defended the "gasworks end". Jack Hogan kicked off with the visitors and George Seagar returned through a kick but Hogan marked in a good position and Arthur Seeling, the Wellington captain made a "nice kick at goal, but the ball did not get over, and a scramble took place under the posts, Roy Siddells got away and galloped well up the field, but would not let the ball out; and the blues forced back". Auckland was awarded a penalty a while later and Dunning kicked well into Wellington territory but Mitchell returned the favour. Alfred Jackson the Auckland half back kicked into the Wellington end and then George Seagar broke away but was forced out a few yards from the line. After a series of scrums in the Wellington end Hogan broke away but then Albert Asher made a fine run for Auckland but they were penalised. Wellington pressed and Harry Childs missed the ball and Wellington were only kept out by John Kay, the player from Ngāruawāhia player but R. Mitchell got possession and "made a brilliant run in at the corner and scored", Seeling making a good attempt at goal but missing however Wellington led 3-0. Play moved around the midfield for a time before Ernie Asher and E. Robinson "put in a fine dash, carrying the leather near Wellington's line". Auckland had a couple of scrum wins and from the second near halfway Jackson got the ball to Frank Morse and on to Robinson who "put in a brilliant dash into Wellington's territory where he passed to Dunning. This player continued the run, but his pass was spoilt. Kay was on the ball like a bird, and forcing himself over, scored in a good position" 20 minutes into the game with Seagar missing the conversion. Play moved around for sometime with both teams having turns on attack before T. Irwin marked and Mitchell missed the attempt at goal and Auckland forced. From the kickout Albert Asher got the ball but was smothered by Wellington defenders and Seeling got his forwards going and they got up to the Auckland line. Childs and Kay both mishandled the slippery ball and Mitchell following up took the ball from Kay on the 25 yard line and sprinting past three men scored with Seeling converting to give Wellington an 8-3 lead. Asher put in a good run for Auckland but was pulled up byt he defense. Ronald MacDonald was moved back to halfback after starting in the second row and Alfred Jackson shifted to five eighths. The pair were responsible for starting a run which ended with Auckland in Wellington territory. Both sides pushed each other up and down the field before Jackson put in a run but failed to pass to three supporting players however Auckland "was not to be denied, and a long pass going out, May missed but Albert Asher, gathering the leather up, got over amidst great applause, at the corner". Bennett made a very good effort from a difficult angle and the ball fell under the posts. Wellington attacked towards the end of the first half but Auckland was in Wellington's quarter when the bell sounded with Wellington ahead 8-6. Mitchell broke away from a scrum before Kay kicked back with Siddells marking about ten yards from halfway and Seeling made a big attempt at goal but it fell just under the posts. Play hung around midfield and then Jackson gathered up the ball and with Dunning's help took play to the Wellington end and a good kick saw Auckland hot on attack with Morse marking the ball in good position but Bennett's attempt at goal failed and Wellington forced. Play moved back to the centre and Ernie Buckland tackled Childs before he was able to get his kick on and Wellington were given a free kick moments later but Seelings attempt was wide and a series of scrums followed on Auckland's line. Wellington continued to attack but Asher sent the ball back with J. Braid marking and A. Gibson having a shot at goal without success. Kay took the ball and made a run, then Alex Stanaway made a run. Kay got the ball back and ran to within a yard of the line. There was a "heated struggle" on the line and Auckland was given a free kick but Asher missed badly. Auckland carried on threatening the line and they received another free kick as Seagar got across and Morse took the kick and leveled the scores at 8-8. The game was described as "fast and brilliant" at this stage and Auckland's backs were getting moving. Albert Asher got over the line amidst excitement but was pulled back for knocking on. All the Auckland backs were involved in various efforts but Mitchell intercepted a pass and kicked back to the centre. Here MacDonald was knocked out and had to be carried off the field. Resuming play with Auckland now only with 12 players Ernie Asher and Childs saved well and then Asher ran 50 yards and he centred the ball right across the field and his brother Albert beat Buckland in a scramble and the ball was taken out near Wellington's line. Robinson who had moved into halfback with MacDonald's injury got the ball away from the resulting scrum and after a dash was pulled up and a fight ensued on the line with Bennett falling across to give Auckland their first lead of the game. Morse converted to put the local side 13-8 ahead. From the kickoff J. Braid, Siddells, and Buckland were all instantly on the ball but Seeling "hurt his leg" and went off leaving the teams equal with 12 each. Auckland went on to attack with a strong kick by Bennett and a "rattling attack then set in by Auckland, and right on the line a scrum was ordered. Auckland got the ball out, and a long pass was sent out to A. Asher, who outpaced Buckland, but was forced out near the corner. Wellington took a turn on attack and Gibson followed a kick and then he in turn kicked across Auckland's line but Auckland forced in time. Wellington returned straight on to attack and Childs saved for Auckland once more. From Auckland's 25, Robinson got away on a run and Jackson took possession and kicked over the heads of the Wellington backs and Kay rushed up the line with a strong sprint and outdistancing everybody scored in the corner. Morse failed with the kick. There was only a minute left in a "splendid game" and Wellington tried hard but only managed to get the ball back past halfway when the bell for full time sounded. In notes on the game the Auckland Star wrote "the match was a brilliant one, and certainly the best exhibition of the Northern Union game seen in Auckland. Wellington were quite equal in class to Auckland, and for a good portion of the game looked like winners. One back. A. Gibson, on the three-quarter line, shone out as a brilliant player, and with Robinson, Auckland's three-quarter player, the pair were responsible for many brilliant incidents". Following the match the visiting Wellington side was entertained at the Waitemata Hotel with the president of the Auckland leagure, Mr. J.S. Dickson presiding. He made a toast to the good exhibition put up by them and complimented them on the sportsmanlike way they took their defeat. Mr. W. Perrett and Mr. Mitchelson responded as did Charles Dunning, the Auckland captain.

5 Aug	Auckland	16–8 (6-8)	Wellington	Victoria Park
3:00	Try: John Kay 2, Albert Asher, Joe Bennett; Con: Frank Morse 1/2, Joe Bennett 0/1, George Seagar 0/1; Pen: Frank Morse 1/1, Albert Asher 0/1, Joe Bennett 0/1 (mark attempt)		Try: R. Mitchell 2 Con: Arthur Seeling 1/2; Pen: Arthur Seeling 0/1 and 0/2 mark attempts, A. Gibson 0/1 mark attempts, R. Mitchell 0/1 mark attempts	Attendance: 5,000; Referee: T. Cunningham

Team details

FB	1	Harry Childs
WG	2	Albert Asher
CE	3	E Robinson
CE	4	John Kay (Ngaruawahia)
WG	5	Ernie Asher
FE	6	Frank Morse
HB	7	Alfred Jackson
PR	8	Jim Griffen
HK	9	Charles Dunning (captain)
PR	10	Joe Bennett
SR	11	Ronald MacDonald
SR	12	Alex Stanaway
LF	13	George Seagar

FB	1	H. Quartermain (11st 6lb)
WG	2	Roy Siddells (12st 4lb)
CE	3	Ernie Buckland (12st 3lb)
CE	4	R. Mitchell (13st 2lb)
WG	5	A. Gibson (12st.)
FE	6	Arthur Seeling (12st 7lb) (captain)
HB	7	J Braid (10st)
PR	8	E. Lambert (12st 7lb)
HK	9	M. Prideaux (11st 13lb)
PR	10	T. Prideaux (11st 12lb)
SR	11	T Irwin (13st 3lb)
SR	12	Jack Hogan (13st 2lb)
LF	13	W Storey (12st 11lb)

=== Auckland v Lower Waikato ===
George Seagar who scored one of Auckland's tries

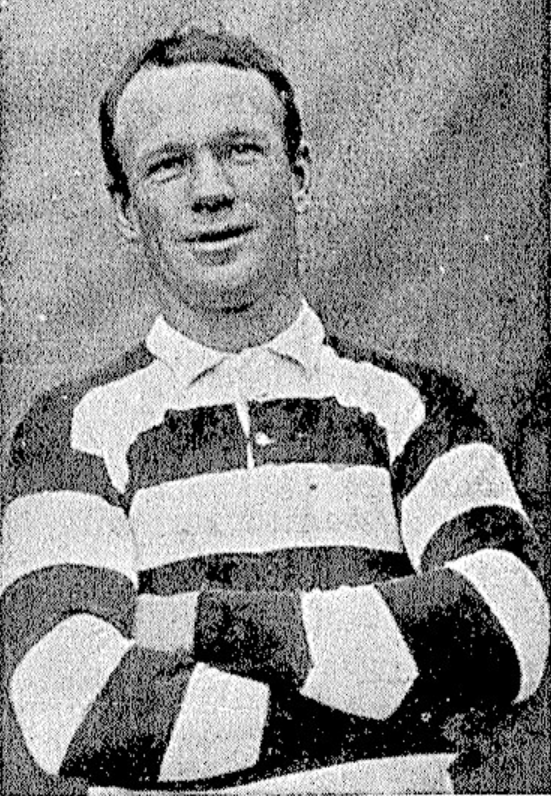
Charles Dunning

John Kay had the distinction of playing for Auckland one week, and then turning out against them the following week for Lower Waikato. Occasionally players from the Waikato and Bay of Plenty regions would represent Auckland. Kay played 3 matches for Auckland in this season. There were several changes to the sides from those initially named, particularly with Auckland as Albert Asher and Alex Stanaway were unable to travel and Harry Fricker and Bob Mitchell took their places. Auckland won the toss and in "beautiful weather" played with the sun on their backs going from east to west. They immediately attacked after Lower Waikato kicked off and E. Robinson ended a passing rush by scoring with George Seagar missed the easy conversion. Joe Bennett and Jim Griffen were responsible for a forward rush which was then sent back to halfway before Alfred Jackson went down the blindside of the scrum and Seagar took play to Waikato's end where Charles Dunning passed to Mitchell who finished things off but his own conversion went wide. Then Auckland five eighth Frank Morse "made a fine run along the sideline, and from his cross kick Bennett scored an easy try" and with a successful conversion from Dunning they were 11-0 ahead. Reg Sprague then kicked a penalty goal for Lower Waikato. They "were encouraged by this success" and pressed with Harry Childs fumbling the ball and John Kay secured the ball and scored but the conversion by Littlewood missed. Auckland retaliated with Robinson taking a kick by J. Dunn and running nearly the length of the field before passing to Jim Rukutai to Robinson to Bennett, who got over for his second try but Dunning missed this kick. Charles Dillamore on the wing, at this stage retired due to an injury to his knee and his place was taken by Phillips of the City Rovers club. Auckland attacked again and Arthur Carlaw crossed for a try after receiving from Morse and dodging his way over and Jim Griffen added the extra points. The halftime break coming and the visitors ahead 19-5. The Waikato Argus wrote that "the second spell was much the same as the first, the Waikato backs, instead of going for their men, seemed to wait, expecting them to pass out, and as a result most of the passing runs of the Auckland backs terminated in tries". After the second half started Sprague "put in a sensational run" and sent on to Kay who scored with Sprague adding the conversion. The sun was well in the Auckland teams eyes which made it hard for them but Morse made a fast run but held on too long. Then Auckland had several scrums near the corner on attack and eventually Bennett scored his third try with Dunning converting to give them a 24-10 lead. Sprague and Kay nearly scored after the resumption but were tackled out in the corner but D. McKercher took a mark in a good position and F. Hall converted the kick to narrow the score by two. Harry fricker made a break through the Lower Waikato defence and then Rukutai took a free kick but missed. Five minutes later R. Gleeson ran round the Auckland team and scored with Sprague's conversion narrowing the score to 24-17. Morse and Rukutai made some good play for Auckland and the ball traveled out to Seagar who scored but the conversion missed. Auckland then quickened the play and Jackson scored twice and Bennett once which meant he had scored four, but none of them were converted. Just on full time Hall scored for Lower Waikato and Sprague converted to make the score a more respectable 36-22. The Waikato Argus noted that the local backs tackled too high but on attack they all played well. On the Auckland side Rukutai in the forwards and Robinson and Carlaw in the backs were very prominent, and whenever they got possession they made a lot of ground for their side.

12 August	Lower Waikato	22–36	Auckland	Caledonian Ground, Frankton
3:00	Try: John Kay 2, F. Hall, R Gleeson; Con: Reg Sprague 3/3, Littlewood 0/1; Pen: Reg Sprague 1/1, F. Hall 1/1 (mark)		Try: E Robinson, Bob Mitchell, Joe Bennett 4, Arthur Carlaw, George Seagar, Alfred Jackson 2 Con: Charles Dunning 2/3, Jim Griffen 1/1, George Seagar 0/1, Bob Mitchell 0/1, Unknown 0/4; Pen: Jim Rukutai 0/1	Attendance: 400; Referee: T. Cunningham

Team details

FB	1	D. McKercher
WG	2	Littlewood
CE	3	John Kay
CE	4	R. Gleeson
WG	5	P Crewe
FE	6	Reg Sprague
HB	7	S. Park
PR	8	W. Sampson
HK	9	J. Dunn
PR	10	F. Jones
SR	11	F. Hall
SR	12	J. Robson
LF	13	H. Henderson
Emergency: M Kay
Emergency: M Park
Emergency: W Raynor
Emergency: M Vincent

FB	1	Harry Childs
WG	2	Charles Dillamore
CE	3	E Robinson
CE	4	Arthur Carlaw
WG	5	George Seagar
FE	6	Frank Morse
HB	7	Alfred Jackson
PR	8	Jim Griffen
HK	9	Charles Dunning (captain)
PR	10	Joe Bennett
SR	11	Jim Rukutai
SR	12	Bob Mitchell
LF	13	Harry Fricker
Emergency: Phillips
Emergency: Sydney Cole

=== Auckland v Hawke's Bay (Northern Union C.C.) ===
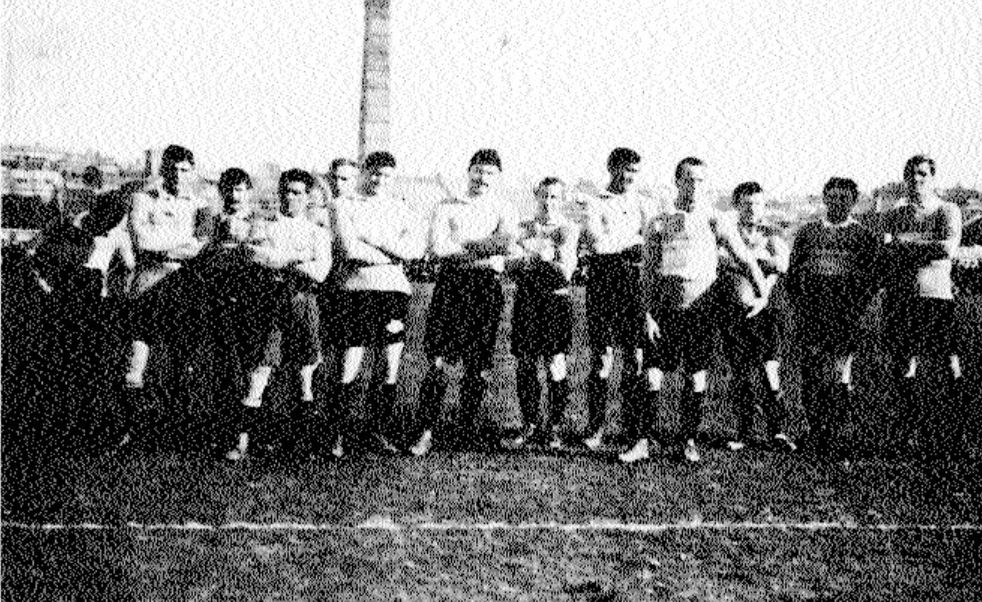
Auckland team

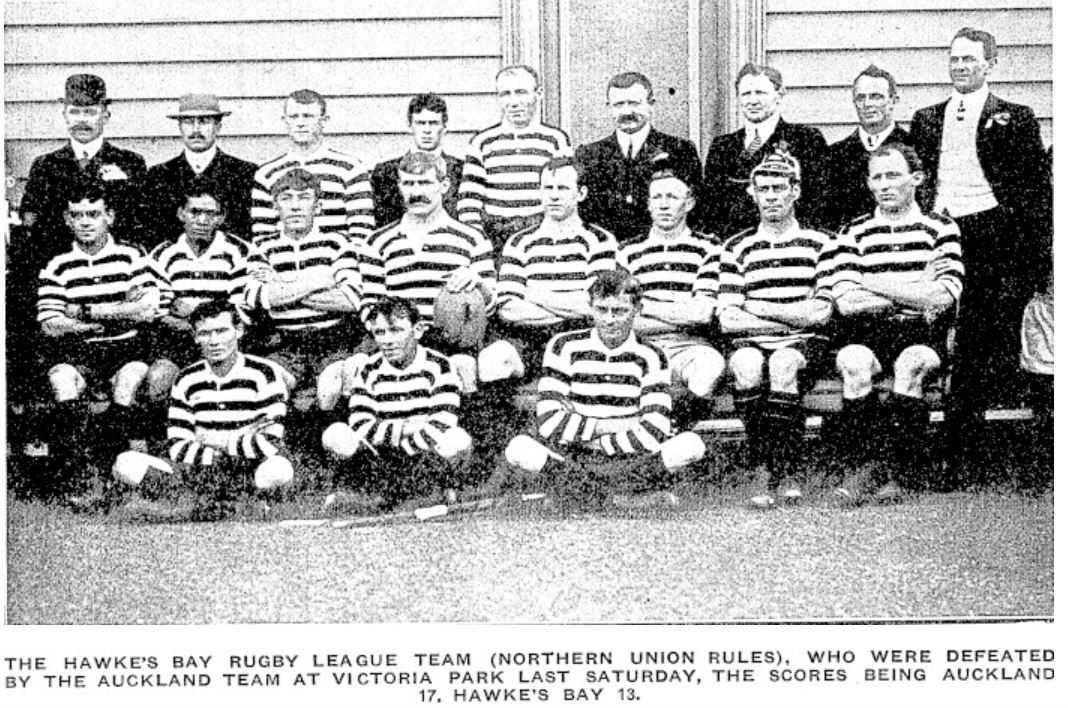
Hawke's Bay team

J. Colwill, J.C. Gleeson, and G. Frater

Alfred Jackson, the Auckland halfback endeavouring to pass the ball to five eighth, Arthur Carlaw.

George Frater leading a forward rush for Hawke's Bay.

Arthur Carlaw about to take a pass from a scrum win for Auckland.

Alf Chorley on Auckland's wing struggling to kick.

Hawke's Bay arrived via the Main Trunk train on Friday morning and stayed at the Waitemata Hotel for the weekend. Auckland captain Charles Dunning won the toss and Auckland defended the gasworks end of Victoria Park. There was a "stiff breeze" blowing but it was across the field and favoured neither side. Hawke's Bay were captained by George Frater who was born in Scotland and had played 262 games for Oldham. Frater kicked off for Hawke's Bay. The visitors attacked early going out near Auckland's line. Auckland advanced play from the scrum to their 25 but from the next scrum Hawke's Bay got it out to J. Colwill and he took play to Auckland's try line where the ball was kicked over the line and Jim Johnson scoring. Johnson would represent New Zealand in a match against New South Wales in 1913. Dave Evans failed with the conversion attempt. Evans had represented the All Blacks in a test against Australia in 1910. Auckland attacked "in a sensational manner". Albert Asher raced quickly in the left wing and then Dunning kicked across the field to Arthur Carlaw who was playing at five eighth. Carlaw gathered the ball and although he was tackled he managed to get back to his feet and dive over the line to level the scores, with George Seagar's conversion giving Auckland a 5-3 lead. Play moved around the field for some time with both teams having time on attack. Frater and Johnson took play to the other end of the field and from a scrum Carlaw took too long with the ball and Hawke's Bay got it with Frater took play deep into Auckland's half and the ball went out quickly to G. Jackson on the wing and he scored in the corner. Taking the kick himself he missed but Hawke's Bay now lead 6-5. After the kickoff Harry Childs chased his own kick hard and tackled a Hawke's Bay player on his 25 yard line. Hawke's Bay then brought the ball back with the ball at their forwards feet. Then Chorley picked up and ran up the line and got the ball out to Seagar who sent it back to Chorley and he was tackled but Auckland "were hot on attack". Hawke's Bay managed to move play down the other end through some "speculative kicks". Hawke's Bay forwards later attacked but Childs picked up cleanly and following up his kick Auckland was again on attack. Alfred Jackson got the ball out to Carlaw to Chorley who had a drop goal attempt but missed and Hawke's Bay forced. Immediately from the kick out Carlaw "put in a brilliant run, almost to the visitors line, when he passed to Jim Griffen" and he scored under the posts with Seagar converting. Carlaw's effort was described as a "sensational corkscrew run from halfway to the line" and he could have scored but handed the ball off to Griffen. There was a quarter of an hour left in the first half and "fast and brilliant football commenced, the home team showing better combination in the back division, and by passing rushes taking play into the reds' territory". Play moved up and down the field and Auckland received a free kick but Seagar's shot at goal missed. John Kay chased the kick across the field and stopped Hawke's Bay from breaking out and he got the ball and sent it to Chorley who was nearly over the line but was stopped and Frater carried play to the centre of the field. Carlaw who was playing a great game and he brought play back to Hawke's Bay's 25, but they were held out and then Dave Evans "galloped about 50 yards down the line". Tom Cotterill, who had come on as a replacement picked up and dived over but was whistled back for offside play. Cotterill had played one match on New Zealand's recent tour of Australia. Both teams attacked but could not score and halftime came with Auckland ahead 10-6. Seagar went off at halftime with an injured shoulder and was replaced by Alex Stanaway. Auckland's backs impressed with several clever individual dodging runs, particularly Asher and Childs but eventually Hawke's Bay got "hot on the attack, and Frater dribbled back to Auckland's territory, where Kelly took a mark from Childs" and G. Jackson kicked it between the posts to narrow the score to 10-8. Play moved around the field through some runs but also a lot of kicking for the next while. E Robinson, Auckland's outside centre got clear away on the left wing but after beating the last man he was brought back by the referee's whistle. Then Kay chased a kick and was pulled out in the corner. Auckland infringed twice and the kicks saw play move to the centre of the field. Here Jackson got the ball to Carlaw but he was collared when he cut in. Then Jackson and Chorley took the ball up and after some dashing attempts Chorley got over in the extreme corner. Dunning, from the sideline landed the ball on the cross bar and it went over. Sixteen minutes remained and G. Jackson for Hawke's Bay took a shot for goal from beyond halfway and the ball made the try line but the wind had blown it wide of the posts and Auckland forced. Hawke's Bay piled pressure on with Jackson tackling Chorley and then the ball came out to Childs but several opponents were on him and he couldn't get his kick in. Frater picked up and "amidst tremendous enthusiasm, scored" and Jackson converted to make it 15-13 to the home side. Carlaw was then prominent in a run with carried play into Hawke's Bay's territory, but J. Ireland stopped it just in time. Hawke's Bay managed to clear their end and settled down on attack. Robinson tried to break away but W. Gumbly was on him. Auckland were given a penalty on the Hawke's Bay 25 and Dunning kicked a "beautiful" penalty. There were four minutes left and the visitors attacked hard and Auckland had to force. Then H. Kelly put in a strong run and Frater taking the ball tried to pass out to the wing but Joe Bennett saved with an interception. There were more scrums near Auckland's line but they managed to force their way out and the bell went with Auckland retaining the Northern Union Cup with a 17-13 win. On the Saturday evening the Hawke's Bay team were entertained at a dinner, Mr. J.S. Dickson, the president of the Auckland Rugby League residing. He toasted "The King", patron of the Northern Union game, and also the visiting team and their captain, George Frater and "commented on the splendid and sportsmanlike fight put up". He wished the team well for their match in Rotorua on Wednesday and Whanganui next Saturday.

19 August	Auckland	17–13	Hawke's Bay	Victoria Park
3:00	Try: Arthur Carlaw, Jim Griffen, Alf Chorley; Con: George Seagar 2/2, Charles Dunning 1/1; Pen: Charles Dunning 1/1, George Seagar 0/1; Drop: Alf Chorley 0/1		Try: Jim Johnson, G Jackson, George Frater; Con: G Jackson 1/2, Dave Evans 0/1; Pen: G Jackson 1/1 (mark), and 0/1 (penalty)	Attendance: 4,000; Referee: Ernest Jaggs

Team details

FB	1	Harry Childs
WG	2	Albert Asher
CE	3	E. Robinson
CE	4	John Kay
WG	5	Alf Chorley
FE	6	Arthur Carlaw
HB	7	Alfred Jackson
PR	8	Jim Griffen
HK	9	Joe Bennett
PR	10	Jim Rukutai
SR	11	Charles Dunning (captain)
SR	12	Bob Mitchell
LF	13	George Seagar
Emergency: Alex Stanaway (came on for Seagar)
Emergency: J. O'Sullivan
Emergency: Harry Fricker
Emergency: George Harrison
Emergency: Alan Blakey

FB	1	Taylor
WG	2	J. Colwill
CE	3	W. Gumbly
CE	4	H. Kelly
WG	5	G. Jackson
FE	6	J. Puru
HB	7	R. Smith
PR	8	J. Ireland
HK	9	J. Beach
PR	10	P. McCarthy
SR	11	Dave Evans
SR	12	Jim Johnson
LF	13	George Frater (captain)
Emergency: Tom Cotterill

=== Auckland v Nelson (Northern Union Challenge Cup) ===
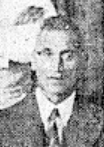
Jim Rukutai, the Auckland lock who represented New Zealand 23 times from 1911 to 1921. The Auckland first grade regular season trophy was named after him and is still competed for today.

The team from Nelson arrived by Main Trunk train on Friday morning and were met by officials from Auckland rugby league and moved to the Waitemata Hotel for their stay. The weather was dull but not wet at Victoria Park and there was an attendance of between 5 and 6,000. The field was "slushy in places, but on the whole was firm, and a good match was seen". Charles James was the left winger for Nelson. He represented New Zealand (Kiwi #45) in 1910. He was killed in France on August 6, 1917 while serving in World War I aged just 26. Also in the Nelson side was Oscar Cederman in the second row and he too was killed in action in Belgium during World War I. The Nelson side also featured Pat Hannigan (Kiwi #48), Bert Feary (Kiwi #53), and Dave Mason (Kiwi #57) who all had represented New Zealand too. G. Stapp, their captain, won the toss and chose to defend the gasworks end. Albert Asher started Auckland on a strong attack which resulted in a five yard scrum. The Nelson forwards broke away and took play to the centre of the field. Arthur Carlaw then made a break for Auckland and passed to Stan Walters who dropped the ball then Nelson were penalised and Dunning took a shot at goal which missed and Nelson forced. Nelson kicked back to Harrison who kicked badly and Cross had a chance for the visitors but was stopped by Albert Asher. Auckland then attacked through Joe Bennett who got the ball out to Reg Sprague (Ngaruawahia) and on to E. Robinson. He was tackled but Auckland kept the attack on and Frank Morse who made a dodgy run and scored near the posts with Charles Dunning making no mistake with the conversion. After attack by both teams Nelson took a mark and "a beautiful kick by Dave Mason" saw them narrow the score to 5-2. With to and fro play both teams moved about the field. Then Arthur Carlaw had to go off injured after being kicked badly with Don Kenealy taking his place. Later Nelson had a penalty near halfway and Oscar Cederman took a shot but missed.The Auckland backs attacked well with Sprague, Asher, and Morse. Nelson were penalised after Charles James had relieved from a scrum with a clever kick. Dunning took a shot and Jim Rukutai followed up and R. Beckley receiving kicked straight at Rukutai and the ball rebounded over the line and he scored with Dunning adding the extra points. Nelson's weight began to tell and they attacked and from a scramble on the line Cederman got across and he added the points to make the score 10-7. The green forwards of Nelson got on the offensive a while later and Mason put in a fine dribbling rush which saw Cederman score again in the corner and he converted with a very good kick. The referee D. McCarthy, penalised Asher and Nelson attacked with James marking in a good position but they missed a shot at goal. Asher beat several players with a run and then the ball was sent right across the field with a defensive kick by G. Stapp and Sprague picked up and after a fine run scored in the corner. Dunning made a good effort but missed. Before halftime Robinson put in a "tricky run" but wasn't able to get over and the whistle went. The second half saw Auckland get the benefit of a "rather good breeze" and they got away with Sprague putting in a good run and transferring to Griffen who had a clear run in to score with Dunning's conversion going wide. Play moved about the field for a time before offside play by the green of Nelson saw Dunning have a shot at goal which missed. Nelson forced from the miss and Feary put in a nice kick but the ball was picked up by Sprague and he beat several players with a dodgy run and passed to Griffen on the line and he scored though Bennett failed with the kick. Sprague went off the field after suffering a kick to the head but came back on later with his head bandaged. Both teams then made efforts to score and play moved about the field then Auckland's forwards got away and Alfred Jackson kicked up field with Stan Walters following up well with a dribble Harry Fricker got over under the posts with Dunning converting. Auckland were starting to dominate and Rukutai "fooled several men and scored easily" though Sprague missed at goal despite a good effort. The Asher "put in a sensational run, nearly the length of the field but Cross got him at the end". The Auckland outside backs put in "another superb run" and the ball went out to Morse to Jackson, Sprague, Robinson, and then on the line to Harrison who scored with Sprague converting to extend Auckland's lead to 30-12. Auckland now made a forward "dash in which Walters and Dunning were prominent" and Walters scored but Dunning missed the kick. Moments later Rukutai added his third try but Griffen failed with the conversion and the game ended 36-12 to Auckland.

26 August	Auckland	38–12 (13-12)	Nelson	Victoria Park
3:00	Try: Frank Morse, Jim Rukutai 3, Reg Sprague, Jim Griffen 2, Harry Fricker, George Harrison, Stan Walters; Con: Charles Dunning 3/6, Reg Sprague 1/2, Jim Griffen 0/1, Joe Bennett 0/1; Pen: Charles Dunning 0/3		Try: Oscar Cederman 2 Con: Oscar Cederman 2/2; Pen: Dave Mason 1/1 (mark)	Attendance: 5,000; Referee: D. McCarthy (Hawke's Bay), line umpires Harker and Pointon

Team details

FB	1	George Harrison
WG	2	Albert Asher
CE	3	Arthur Carlaw (off injured)
CE	4	Reg Sprague
WG	5	E. Robinson
FE	6	Frank Morse
HB	7	Alfred Jackson
PR	8	Jim Griffen
HK	9	Charles Dunning (captain)
PR	10	Joe Bennett
SR	11	Harry Fricker
SR	12	Stan Walters
LF	13	Jim Rukutai
Emergency: Don Kenealy (on for Arthur Carlaw)
Emergency: Alan Blakey
Emergency: J. O'Sullivan
Emergency: Alex Stanaway

FB	1	R. Beckley (11st 4lb)
WG	2	Charles James (11st 2lb)
CE	3	Dave Mason (14st 7lb)
CE	4	P. Page (12st 8lb)
WG	5	Cross (12st 6lb)
FE	6	Pat Hannigan (12st.)
HB	7	G. Stapp (11st 7lb) Captain
PR	8	Bert Feary (13st 8lb)
HK	9	Kempster Feary (12st 10lb)
PR	10	D'Arcy Franchelle (13st)
SR	11	W. Doyle (15st 10lb)
SR	12	Oscar Cederman (13st 4lb)
LF	13	V. Mason (13st 8lb)
Emergency: H. Sparrow (14st 7lb)

=== Auckland v Taranaki (Northern Union Challenge Cup) ===
The Auckland team. Captain, Charles Dunning is holding the ball. Albert Asher is two to his left.

Players look at a kick. Charles Dunning is the nearest Auckland player looking upwards.

Alfred Jackson working the blindside for Auckland against Taranaki on September 2, 1911 at Victoria Park in their rugby league match.

Auckland and Taranaki competing for the ball in their rugby league match on September 2, 1911 at Victoria Park.

Alfred Jackson, the Auckland rugby league halfback with the ball v Taranaki on September 2, 1911 at Victoria Park in Auckland.

L. Walsh, the Taranaki rugby league halfback with the ball in their rugby league match with Auckland at Victoria Park on September 2, 1911.

A forward battle between Auckland and Taranaki rugby league teams at Victoria Park on September 2, 1911.

This was the fifth time the two representative sides had met. Taranaki were met after arriving by Auckland Rugby League officials, and welcomed by Mr. J.S. Dickson (president). The Taranaki team was managed by Mr. T. Smith. The crowd at Victoria Park was the largest of the season, registering 6,000 and the match was refereed by Matt Hooper. It was the last time the Northern Union Cup would be competed for in the season. In the Auckland team Reg Sprague was replaced by Alf Chorley as he was unable to come to Auckland from the Waikato. C Moir, the Taranaki five eighth was their captain and he won the toss and chose to defend the gasworks end in the first half. Auckland gradually moved the ball down to the Taranaki end where Albert Asher took the ball but was forced out within seconds. For Taranaki Arthur Hardgrave took possession and relieved with a centering kick with J Charteris following up to put the visitors on attack. However they were penalised by referee Matt Hooper and the kick took play back to halfway. From the scrum E. Robinson and Frank Morse passed the ball between them until Morse was taken to the ground and Don Kenealy on his representative debut quickly took up the ball and carried play down to the Taranaki corner but he was stopped by P. Sullivan, the Taranaki inside centre. Taranaki were penalised from this position but Charles Dunning was unsuccessful with the conversion attempt. Auckland had more of the attacking play but nothing of a close nature and then Taranaki had a turn "hot on the attack" with a scrum where O. Tocker got the ball out to captain, C. Moir, who sent it to G. McLean, "who put in a fine dodgy run, before passing near the posts to P. Kyle". He took a clean pass and ran past Harry Childs, the Auckland fullback and scored under the posts with Hardgrave's adding the conversion giving them a 5-0 lead after 15 minutes. Auckland retaliated with a passing run but it was spolied y Robinson passing badly. A "sensational run" followed when Asher took the ball from M. Julian, the Taranaki winger, and after running half the field he attempted to leap Hardgrave but was brought heavily to the ground. Tranaki brought play back to halfway but Kenealy passed out to Asher again and he "beat the field in a brilliant manner" and put the ball down near the posts with Dunning evening the scores. Taranaki trapped Auckland in their half for several minutes and after a series of scrums Auckland were penalised with Hardgrave taking a shot at goal from an easy position but missing. Auckland forced from the kick and then from the kick out Jim Rukutai got on the ball and got on attack. The whole forward pack was involved and from a team rush they got the ball over the Taranaki line in a pile of bodies. Eventually when they all cleared Rukutai was credited with the try and Dunning converted. Auckland attacked hard and offside play gave them a chance for a penalty attempt but Dunning's good effort saw it hit the post and miss. Auckland continued to attack but Taranaki were gifted some penalties but Hardgrave missed a penalty attempt and it bounced back off Rukutai back to Hardgrave who then attempted a drop goal but was also without success and Auckland forced. Auckland kicked out and Joe Bennett made a fine run from the Auckland forwards and passed to Jim Griffen just as Dan Twohill tackled him, but he passed to Harry Fricker and he just managed to get over under the posts with Dunning again converting to give Auckland a 15-5 lead with 5 minutes left in the first half. Auckland "set up another attack, but Pukere and Charters frustrated this" and they removed the danger. Alfred Jackson worked the blindside of a scrum but Twohill intercepted a pass and ran back to Childs. After a lot of inaccurate play and several scrums Auckland forced the ball. Just on halftime Robinson got away but kicked too hard over Hardgrave's head and Twohill forced leaving the halftime score as it was, 15-5 to Auckland. Each team took turns on attack early in the second half but it was Taranaki who scored first after they failed to keep out L. Walsh, the Taranaki hooker after P. Kyle picked up and sent a pass out to him. Hardgrave converted to narrow the deficit to 15-10. Auckland went on attack and Frank Morse broke away and passed to Harry Fricker went over the try line in the tackle of M. Julian but failed to ground the ball. After several defensive scrums Taranaki eventually relieved from a mark by Moir. Jim Griffen took the mark from Moir's kick and Dunning took a shot for goal but missed. A while later E. Robinson put in a "dodgy run" and passed to Bob Mitchell but he threw a forward pass back to Robinson who ran over but the referee pulled them back. Taranaki were penalised after Auckland continued to attack and Dunning made a bad effort at goal. Both team were said to be tiring and Auckland was losing its combination. Kenealy chased a long kick by Chorley and got the ball down the Taranaki end but knocked on. Tocker and Chateris put in a good run from the resulting scrum and Harry Childs had to save for Auckland and then Mitchell, Dunning, and Fricker made a run up the line with Fricker scoring in the corner. Dunnings kick failed but Auckland now led 18-10. Auckland nearly scored again when Alfred Jackson worked the blind side of the scrum and a try looked certain with Asher following but Jackson passed badly and Kyle, who was playing "an excellent forward game" for Taranaki relieved the pressure. Asher who was "playing up to his best form" returned with a run and Morse and Kenealy nearly got over but Twohill cleared the play with a long kick. Childs was nearly caught in possession from the kick but dodged three defenders and kicked and Morse nearly scored from a run. Jackson and Mitchell got the ball in the corner but were forced out. From the scrum Tocker got away and took play to the centre and Sullivan got possession and made a brilliant run across field before sending it to Twohill who scored. Hardgrave kicked a "beautiful goal" to make the score 18-15 with seven minutes remaining and "excitement was high". Taranaki's forwards "made a determined attack" but then from a scrum Auckland won possession and George Harrison passed to Asher and he gave it on to Mitchell who made a "dashing run" and scored in the corner as he was tackled. Asher made a good attempt at goal from a difficult angle but the ball struck the post and missed. With five minutes left Asher "beat everybody when near the line, and planted the ball between the posts" with Dunning converting and the end came shortly after with Auckland victorious 26-15. In comments on the game afterwards it was said to be somewhat disappointing with handling and combination lacking compared to previous games. A "weak spot" was Alfred Jackson at halfback who failed "completely to set his backs going" and he "generally fielded the ball badly, and when he did secure shot his passes out to Morse in a most erratic manner". Robinson also failed to combine but made some good openings while Childs played "a safe game at fullback" and Morse did good work in the second half. Asher played "his usual dangerous game" but his hurdling tactics which he was famous for were criticised as they often led to injury and were not successful in this game. The Auckland forwards were said to have played "a fairly good game, the most prominent being Dunning, Bennett, Mitchell, and Rukutai". Of the Taranaki team Hardgrave (fullback), Twohill (wing), and Moir (halfback) in the backs, and Kyle (second row) and Pukere (prop) in the forwards were singled out.

2 September	Auckland	26–15 (15-5)	Taranaki	Victoria Park
3:00	Try: Albert Asher 2, Jim Rukutai, Harry Fricker 2, Bob Mitchell; Con: Charles Dunning 4/5, Albert Asher 0/1; Pen: Charles Dunning 0/3, and 0/1 (mark)		Try: P Kyle, C Moir, Dan Twohill; Con: Arthur Hardgrave 3/3; Pen: Arthur Hardgrave 0/2; Drop: Arthur Hardgrave 0/1	Attendance: 6,000; Referee: Matt Hooper

Team details

FB	1	Harry Childs
WG	2	Albert Asher
CE	3	E. Robinson
CE	4	Alf Chorley
WG	5	Don Kenealy
FE	6	Frank Morse
HB	7	Alfred Jackson
PR	8	Jim Griffen
HK	9	Charles Dunning (Captain)
PR	10	Joe Bennett
SR	11	Bob Mitchell
SR	12	Jim Rukutai
LF	13	Harry Fricker
Emergency: Alan Blakey
Emergency: George Harrison
Emergency: Matters
Emergency: Alex Stanaway
Emergency: Harold (Roy) Denize
Emergency: J. Cummings

FB	1	Arthur Hardgrave
WG	2	Dan Twohill
CE	3	G. McLean
CE	4	P. Sullivan
WG	5	M. Julian
FE	6	C. Moir (captain)
HB	7	O. Tocker
PR	8	W. Pukere
HK	9	L. Walsh
PR	10	A. Morshead
SR	11	P. Kyle
SR	12	J. Charteris
LF	13	W. Fincham
Manager: T. Smith

=== Auckland v Hawke's Bay Māori ===
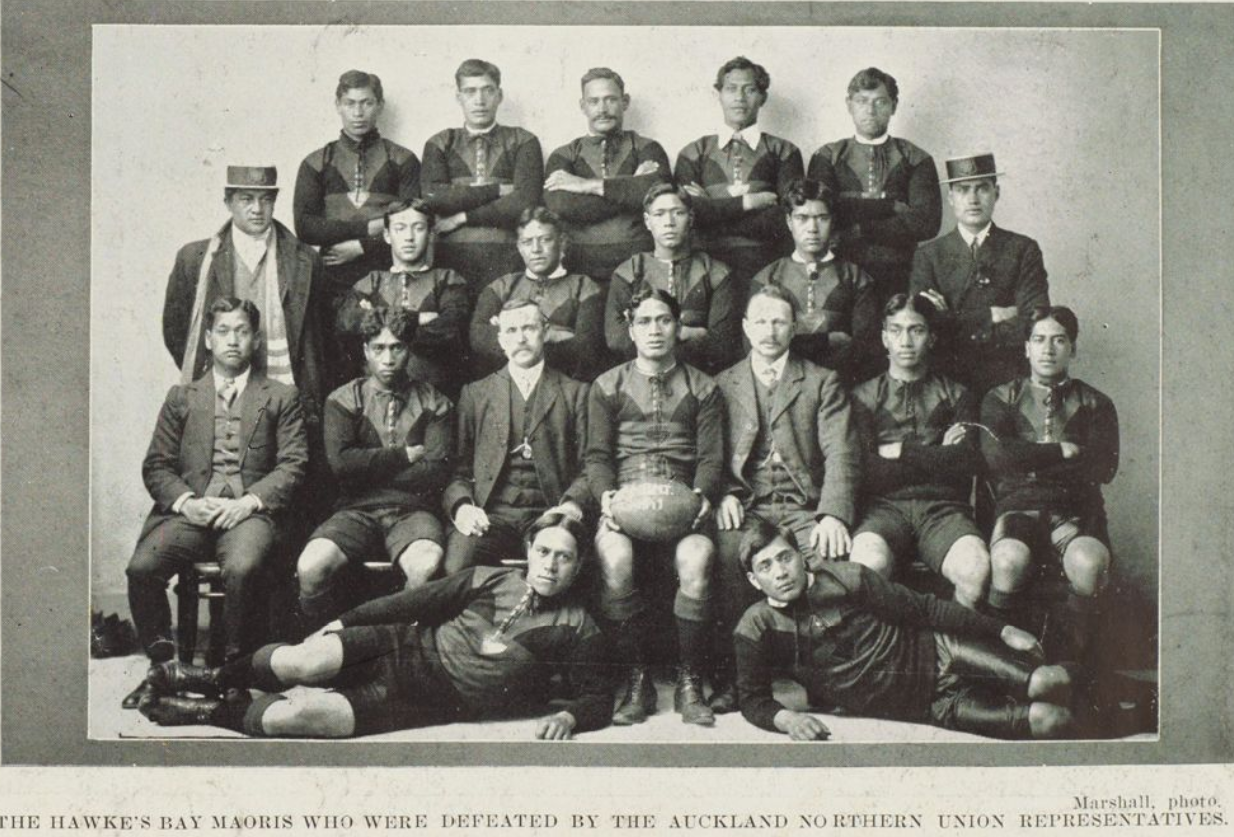

The Hawkes Bay Māori side played in green and black, and there was a "fair attendance" at the Takapuna Racecourse ground. The visitors won the toss and played with a "stiff breeze" behind them. Auckland captain Charles Dunning kicked off and forward play led the way for several minutes. Play moved about the field for some time and then Auckland were penalised but Te Hau's shot at goal missed. He later had a penalty attempt from near halfway as Auckland struggled against the wind but it went low and Auckland forced. The Māori side attacked again but Auckland broke out and Joe Bennett picked up the ball in his 25 and he had a clear run and managed to out pace his opponents to score between the posts 20 minutes into the game. Dunning added the conversion for a 5-0 lead. the Hawkes Bay side was able to use the wind and Te Hau nearly got across and Auckland were penalised and W. Hiha "kicked a beautiful goal". Hawke's Bay pushed on to attack and then Phillips, Don Kenealy, and Charles Linkhorn brought things back for Auvckland but then the Hawke's Bay Māori side had their forwards attack the Auckland line and Hoani Kani scored near the posts with Hiha converting. Auckland then attacked and from a scrum Phillips got the ball out to Mitchell to Kenealy who send a long pass out to George Hunt and he proved too fast and scored with Dunning just missing the kick. Halftime came with Auckland in the lead 8-7. Auckland turned around with a wind behind them that had strengthened and "within a couple of minutes George Hunt was over the line, but could not touch down in time, and the visitors forced". Auckland shortly after kicked dead and Hawke's Bay Maori took the ball into Auckland territory and Paewai got the ball and managed to get over in the corner with Puro Te Hau missing the conversion. Auckland took play into the Maori sides end but struggled to get the ball away from the scrum. After several minutes on a "brisk attack" they made their opponents force and Auckland took a penalty attempt but failed. Mitchell and Bennett were prominent on attack and Jim Griffen got the ball and forced his way over, with Asher unable to convert. The Māori side had a run by W. Hiha down field and a long pass went out to Paewai who looked like scoring but he was "stopped in time, and Auckland responded with a fast passing run, the ball going eventually to Asher, who beat Hoani Kani at fullback, and scored" after a "characteristic run from the twenty-five" where he dodged hos way through. This time Charles Dunning missed the conversion. Auckland were straight back on attack and Bennett got away and scored and he took the conversion but hit the post. Then once again Auckland got away with Bennett taking play right under the visitors posts and he passed but it went forward and a certain try was lost. Some rough play then took place and an Auckland player was knocked down from a punch to the jaw but the referee did not see it. Play continued and Auckland forced the Maori side to force. Play then moved into Auckland's half but was quickly pushed back and "after a number of attacks Charles Linkhorn got over just before the whistle". The try was converted and Auckland had won 22-10.

9 September	Auckland	22–10	Hawke’s Bay Māori	Takapuna Racecourse
3:00	Try: Joe Bennett 2, George Hunt, Jim Griffen, Albert Asher, Charles Linkhorn; Con: Charles Dunning 2/4, Albert Asher 0/1, Joe Bennett 0/1; Pen: Unknown 0/2		Try: W Paewai, Hopi Kani; Con: W Hiha 1/1, Puro Te Hau 0/1; Pen: W. Hiha 1/1, Puro Te Hau 0/2	Attendance: 500; Referee: T Cunningham

Team details

FB	1	Harry Childs
WG	2	Albert Asher
CE	3	George Hunt
CE	4	Harold (Roy) Denize
WG	5	Don Kenealy
FE	6	Charles Linkhorn
HB	7	Phillips
PR	8	Jim Griffen
HK	9	Charles Dunning (Captain)
PR	10	Joe Bennett
SR	11	Jim Rukutai
SR	12	Harry Fricker
LF	13	Bob Mitchell
Emergency: Alan Blakey
Emergency: George Smith
Emergency: George Harrison
Emergency: Stan Walters
Emergency: Alex Stanaway

FB	1	Hoani Kani
WG	2	W. Paewai
CE	3	M. Meihana
CE	4	Rangikotua
WG	5	Wi Paraone
FE	6	W. Hiha
HB	7	Puro Te Hau (Captain)
PR	8	J. Hopi Kani
HK	9	R. Rautatu
PR	10	M. Kani
SR	11	L. Nomana
SR	12	K. Hami
LF	13	A. Kini
Emergency: S. Hama
Emergency: R. Wharepapa
Emergency: H. Koterini
Emergency: T. Nikora
Manager: H. Park
Chairman: J.B. Eaton

=== Auckland v Country (Waihi & Rotorua) ===
A month after Auckland's match with Hawke's Bay Māori an exhibition game was arranged in Waihi against a 'Country' team from the Rotorua and Waikato districts. It was the first ever rugby league match played in the area and was played on the Waihi Domain in front of a "fairly large crowd". The Country team featured Rukingi Reke (Joseph Rogers) who would go on to play for six games for New Zealand in 1912 and 1913 on the tour of Australia and was the 84th player to represent the country. He later went on to play 8 games for Bay of Plenty rugby union side in 1919-20. Despite regular front row forwards Charles Dunning, Joe Bennett, and Jim Griffen not making the trip Auckland still took a strong side and ran out winners 20-10. They left Auckland on board the steamer Waimarie at 3pm on the 13th of October. While the local side was assembling at Morrinsville and proceeding by rail to Waihi. The weather was "very bad, rain falling most of the time" but there was still a "fairly large crowd". The correspondent for the Auckland Star said that "the ball was very greasy. A good even game resulted, there being not ten points' difference between the merits of the play. Auckland. however proved too superior to their opponents in the finer points of the game. The collaring was weak on both sides. The game is likely to prove a success here, as from a spectacular point of view it is considerably superior to ordinary rugby, and is faster, more open, and interesting. A meeting of the league was held on Saturday night to form a local branch".

14 October	Country	10-20	Auckland	Waihi Domain (Recreation Reserve)
3:00	Try: F Hall, St George; Con: Rukingi Reke 2/2		Try: Albert Asher 2, E Robinson, Frank Morse, Henry Bettis, George Seagar; Con: Stan Walters 1/1, Unknown 0/5	Referee: Bob Oliphant

Team details

FB	1	Harry Childs
WG	2	Albert Asher
CE	3	E. Robinson
CE	4	George Hunt
WG	5	Don Kenealy
FE	6	Frank Morse
HB	7	Alfred Jackson
PR	8	Jim Rukutai
HK	9	Bob Mitchell
PR	10	Stan Walters
SR	11	Harry Fricker
SR	12	George Seagar
LF	13	Henry Bettis
Emergency: Charles Linkhorn

FB	1	Rawson (Rotorua)
WG	2	Hastedt (Rotorua)
CE	3	Rukingi Reke (Rotorua)
CE	4	S. Hughes (Waikato)
WG	5	R. Gleeson (Waikato)
FE	6	C. Devery (Waikato)
HB	7	Blincoe (Waikato)
PR	8	Kira (Rotorua)
HK	9	Reed (Rotorua)
PR	10	Walker (Waikato)
SR	11	St. George (Rotorua)
SR	12	F. Hall (Waikato)
LF	13	J. Dunn (Waikato)
Emergency: F. Jones (Waikato)

=== Auckland representative matches played and scorers ===
Rank	Name	Club	Play	Tries	Con	Pen	Mark	DG	Points
1	Joe Bennett	Newton	7	9	0/5	0/1	0/1	-	27
2	Charles Dunning	Ponsonby	6	-	12/21	1/7	0/1	-	26
3	Albert Asher	City	7	6	1/4	0/1	-	-	20
4	Jim Griffen	North Shore	8	4	1/2	-	-	-	14
5=	Harry Fricker	Ponsonby	7	4	0/1	-	-	-	12
5=	Jim Rukutai	Manukau	6	4	-	0/1	-	-	12
7=	Frank Morse	City	5	2	1/2	1/1	-	-	10
7=	George Seagar	North Shore	4	2	2/4	0/1	-	-	10
9=	Arthur Carlaw	Ponsonby	5	3	-	-	-	-	9
9=	John Kay	Komakorau (Ngaruawahia)	3	3	-	-	-	-	9
11	Stan Walters	North Shore	3	2	1/1	-	-	-	8
12=	Alfred Jackson	North Shore	8	2	-	-	-	-	6
12=	Bob Mitchell	City	6	2	0/1	-	-	-	6
12=	George Harrison	City	2	2	-	-	-	-	6
12=	E Robinson	City	8	2	-	-	-	-	6
16	Reg Sprague	(Ngaruawahia)	1	1	1/2	-	-	-	5
17=	Henry Bettis	Ponsonby	1	1	-	-	-	-	3
17=	Alf Chorley	Ponsonby	3	1	-	-	-	0/1	3
17=	George Hunt	City	2	1	-	-	-	-	3
20	Sydney Cole	Ponsonby	1	-	1/1	-	-	-	2
21	Harry Childs	City	7	-	-	-	-	-	0
21	Don Kenealy	Eden	4	-	-	-	-	-	0
21	Charles Dillamore	Ponsonby	2	-	-	-	-	-	0
21	Charles Linkhorn	Newton	2	-	-	-	-	-	0
21	Phillips	City	2	-	-	-	-	-	0
21	Alex Stanaway	City	2	-	-	-	-	-	0
21	Ernie Asher	City	1	-	-	-	-	-	0
21	J Cummings	Eden	1	-	-	-	-	-	0
21	Roy Denize	City	1	-	-	-	-	-	0
21	Samuel Houghton	Ponsonby	1	-	-	-	-	-	0
21	Ronald MacDonald	North Shore	1	-	-	-	-	-	0
21	J O'Sullivan	City	1	-	-	-	-	-	0
21	Stan Weston	North Shore	1	-	-	-	-	-	0
N/A	Unknown stats (from 3 games)	-	-	-	0/9	0/2	-	-	0
TOTAL	All Players	-	119	51	20/51	2/14	0/2	0/1	201
