= 1911 New Zealand rugby league season =

Seasons
- ← 1910 1912 →

The 1911 New Zealand rugby league season was the fourth season of rugby league that had been played in New Zealand.

== International competitions ==
New Zealand toured Australia, playing in no Test matches. This was the first tour of a New Zealand side since the formation of the New Zealand Rugby League. They lost three matches to New South Wales, defeated Newcastle by 21–20, defeated Queensland two games to one and defeated Hunter River by 40–8. The touring party included Charles Dunning, Ernie Asher, Ernie Buckland, Roy Siddells, Barney Winder, Frank Morse, Ronald MacDonald, George Seagar, Jack Stanaway, William Mackrell and George A. Gillett. During the tour they were joined by former All Black Billy Mitchell, who had been brought over to Australia to play in the Queensland Rugby League competition. Before the tour New Zealand defeated Auckland 16–14 at the Takapuna Racecourse.

New Zealand also provided four players to the Australasian tour of Great Britain; George A. Gillett, Arthur Francis, Charlie Savory and Frank Woodward. Former New Zealand international Con Sullivan also toured with the team but at the time was competing in the NSWRL Premiership.

During the season Wellington and Hawke's Bay were admitted to the New Zealand Rugby League.

== National competitions ==
=== Northern Union Cup ===
Auckland had been awarded the Northern Union Cup by the 1910 Great Britain Lions. They successfully defended it four times in 1911, defeating Wellington 16–8 on 5 August, Hawke's Bay 17–13 on 19 August, Nelson 36–12 on 26 August and Taranaki 26–15 on 2 September. Nelson included Bert Feary, Pat Hannigan, Dave Mason and Charles James.

=== Inter-provincial matches ===
Auckland also bet the Lower Waikato 36–22 at Frankton and the Hawke's Bay Māori 22–10 on the North Shore in non-challenge matches. Reg Sprague played for Lower Waikato and later played for Auckland against Nelson. Arthur Francis represented Auckland and later played for Wigan and Hull F.C. Frank Woodward was selected for Auckland from the Rotorua sub-league.

Other players to play for Auckland during the season included Albert Asher, Ernie Asher, Arthur Carlaw, Stan Walters, Charles Dunning, Ronald MacDonald, George Seagar, Jack Stanaway, Frank Morse and Bob Mitchell.

Wellington included Roy Siddells and Ernie Buckland.

== Club competitions ==
=== Auckland ===
City won the Auckland Rugby League's Myers Cup.

The Manukau Northern Union Football Club were captained by James Rukutai. City included Jack Stanaway and Albert and Ernie Asher, Ponsonby included Charles Dunning and Ronald MacDonald and the North Shore included George Seagar.

Otahuhu was founded in 1911.

=== Other Competitions ===
The Ngaruawahia, Huntly, Taupiri and Rangiriri clubs were founded, forming the Lower Waikato District League. Only the Ngaruawahia club still exists today. Reg Sprague, from Ngaruawahia, made the New Zealand side that same year.

The Hawke's Bay Rugby League was founded in 1911 with the help of All Golds Jim Gleeson and Edward Tyne. Future dual international Dave Evans was said to be instrumental in helping three Hawke's Bay Rugby Union clubs switch codes; Clive, Ahuriri and Kia Toa. With the help of local politician Vigor Brown, the Rugby League secured the use of McLean Park.

The first overseas transfer occurred in 1911 when Riki Papakura was cleared to play for Warrington and the 20 pounds fee was forwarded to the Rotorua sub-league.
