= Alfred Jackson (rugby league) =

New Zealand international rugby league footballer (

Personal information
- Full name: Alfred Edward Jackson
- Born: c.1876
- Died: 3 October 1958 (aged 81–82) Auckland, New Zealand

Playing information
- Position: Halfback, Five-eighth
Club
| Years | Team | Pld | T | G | FG | P |
|---|---|---|---|---|---|---|
| 1909–16 | North Shore | 22 | 4 | 3 | 0 | 18 |
Representative
| Years | Team | Pld | T | G | FG | P |
| 1909–11 | Auckland | 23 | 7 | 0 | 0 | 21 |
| 1913 | New Zealand | 3 | 0 | 0 | 0 | 0 |

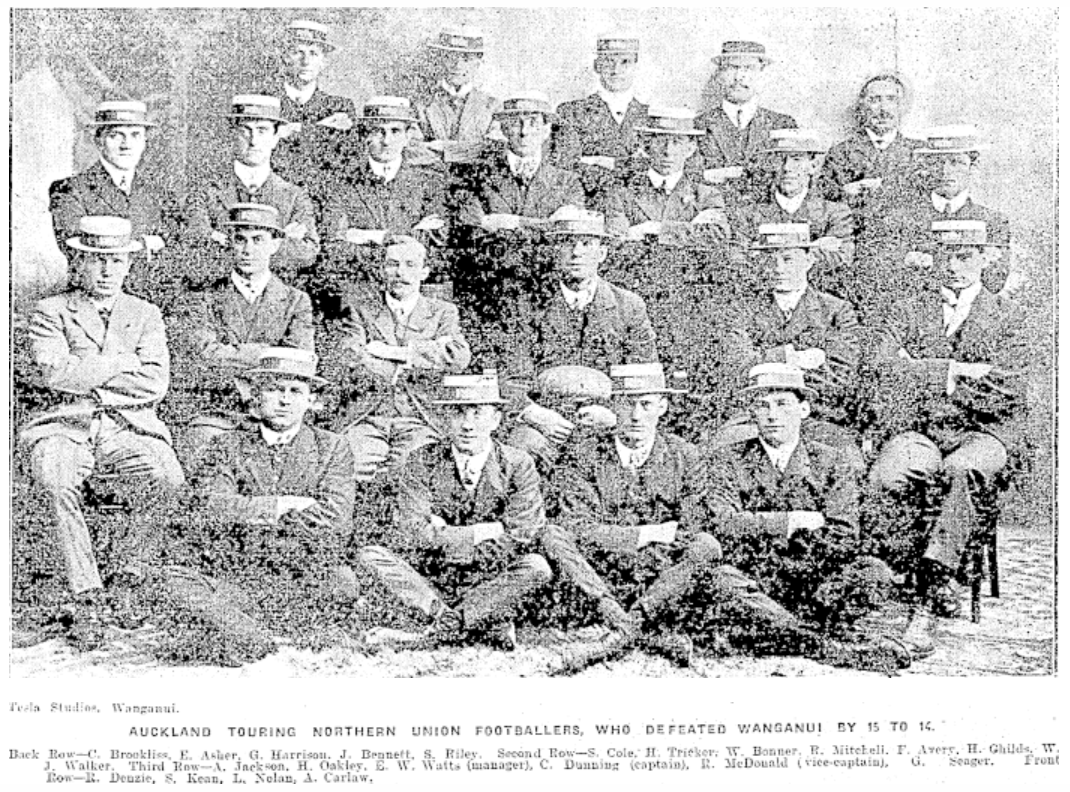

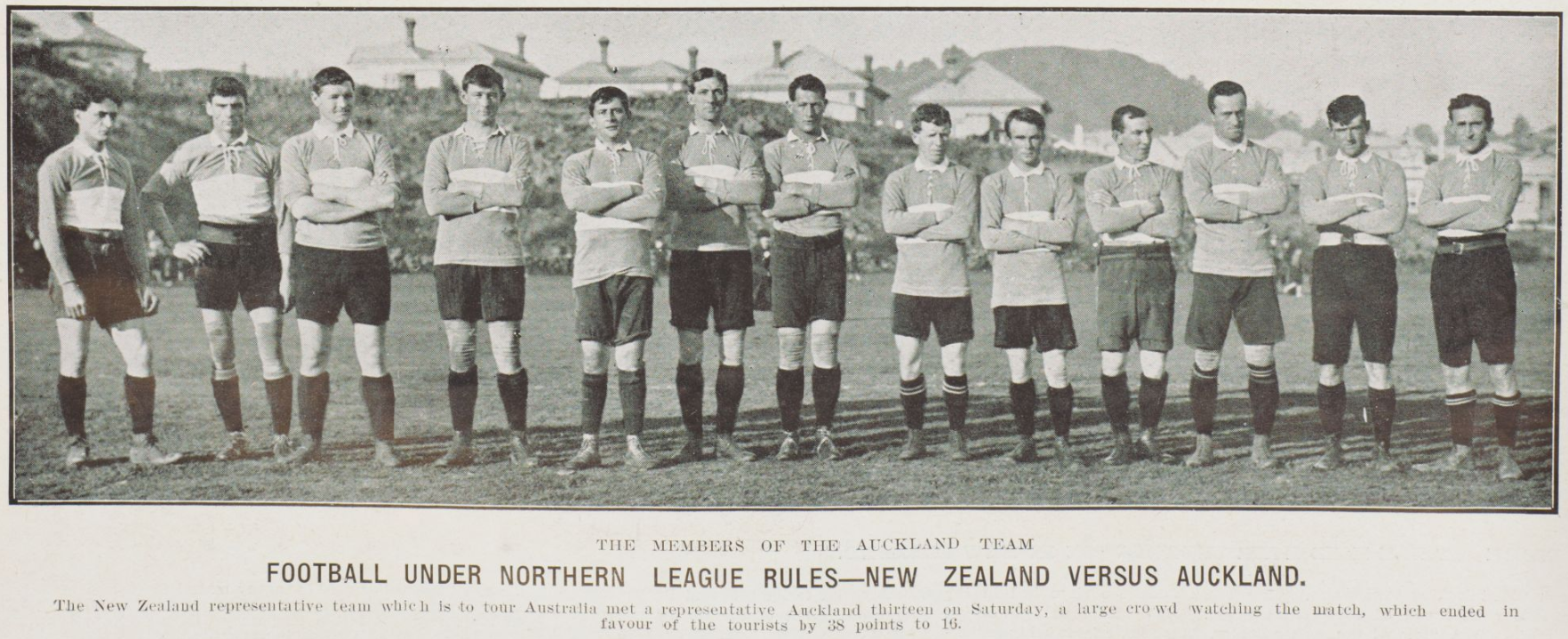
Jackson in the Auckland rugby league team at Eden Park before their game against New Zealand.

Alfred Edward "Alf" Jackson was a New Zealand rugby league footballer who played in the 1900s and 1910s.

Jackson passing from a scrum for Auckland against Hawke's Bay on August 19, 1911.

Jackson played either as a five-eighth or halfback. He represented the North Shore rugby league club and played for Auckland. He retired in the 1913 season but came out of retirement to help the side in 1916 during the war years.

On 7 August 1909, Jackson played for Auckland against Taranaki. He played in the game for Auckland against the touring Lions in 1910. He was then part of the 1910 Auckland side that toured the country between 20 September and 13 October, playing matches in Wanganui, Bluff, Invercargill, Dunedin, Napier and Dannevirke.

Jackson played for New Zealand during the 1913 New Zealand rugby league tour of Australia, a tour where no test matches were played.
