= 1911 New Zealand rugby league tour of Australia =

The 1911 New Zealand rugby league tour of Australia was a tour by the New Zealand national rugby league team. It was the first tour organised by the New Zealand Rugby League.

The trip earned the NZRL £3000 profit, thanks to £4000 from gate takings. The tour served as a selection for the 1911-12 Australasian tour of Great Britain and resulted in the selection of George A. Gillett, Arthur Francis, Charlie Savory and Frank Woodward on that tour.

== Squad ==
The touring party included backs; Ernie Asher, Ernie Buckland, Sid Kean, Ronald MacDonald, Frank Morse, Roy Siddells, George Smith, Reg Sprague, Barney Winder, Frank Woodward, forwards; Charles Dunning, Tom Cotterill, Bert Feary, Arthur Francis, Dave Mason, Walter Milne, Jim Rukutai, Charles Savory, Alex Stanaway and utilities; George A. Gillett and George Seagar.

Jim Gilmour and former All Black Billy Mitchell joined the team while in Australia. Mitchell had been bought over to Australia to play in the Queensland Rugby League competition. Gilmour played for Queensland before joining the New Zealand side.

The team was managed by Ted Phelan of Auckland.

== Fixtures ==
Before the tour New Zealand defeated Auckland 16-14 at the Takapuna Racecourse.

They lost three matches to New South Wales, defeated Newcastle by 21-20, defeated Queensland two games to one and defeated Hunter River by 40-8.

Date	Opponent	Venue	Result	Score	Attendance	Report
	New South Wales	Sydney Cricket Ground, Sydney	Loss	10-35	46,000	
	New South Wales	Sydney	Loss	10-26		
	Newcastle	Newcastle	Win	21-20		
	Queensland	Brisbane Cricket Ground, Brisbane	Win	24-13		
	Queensland	Brisbane	Loss	13-23		
	Queensland	Brisbane	Win	18-14		
	Hunter river	Newcastle	Win	40-8		
	New South Wales	Sydney	Loss	7-39		

The first match against New South Wales was the first match of rugby league held at the Sydney Cricket Ground and netted the New South Wales Rugby League a record gate receipts of £2551 and 10 shillings.
