= Walter Milne (rugby) =

NZ international rugby league & union footballer

Personal information
- Full name: Walter Henry Milne
- Born: 5 August 1884 New Zealand
- Died: 19 July 1969 (aged 84) New Zealand

Playing information
- Weight: 87.99 kg (13 st 12.0 lb)

Rugby union
Club
Years	Team	Pld	T	G	FG	P
1906	Britannia (Sthld.)	8	0	0	0	0
1907	Taieri Rovers (Dun.)	14	2	0	0	6
1908	Hunterville (Wang.)	3	1	0	0	3
1910	Okaiawa (Tar.)	11	3	0	0	9
1921	Rahotu-Okato	1	1	0	0	3
1922	Opunake	5
	Total	42	7	0	0	21
Representative
Years	Team	Pld	T	G	FG	P
1906	Southland	5	0	0	0	0
1908–09	Wanganui	10	0	0	0	0
1908	Rangitikei (sub-union)	2	0	0	0	0
1909	Awarua (sub-union)	1	0	0	0	0
1909	North Island	1	0	0	0	0
1910	Taranaki	4	2	0	0	6

Rugby league
- Position: Forward
Club
Years	Team	Pld	T	G	FG	P
1913	Opunake	1
1919	Ponsonby (ARL)	4	0	0	0	0
	Total	5	0	0	0	0
Representative
Years	Team	Pld	T	G	FG	P
1911	New Zealand	1	0	0	0	0
1913	Taranaki	3	0	0	0	0

Walter Henry Milne (5 August 1884 – 19 July 1968) was a New Zealand rugby league footballer who played in the 1910s. He played at representative level for New Zealand, and Southland, and at club level for Ponsonby, as a forward.

== Rugby football career ==
Milne originally played rugby union, playing for the Britannia club in Southland in 1906. He played 8 matches for them in that season and made 5 appearances for Southland against Otago (twice), Wellington, Auckland, and Canterbury. In 1907 he moved to Otago and played for Taieri Rovers. It was rumoured that he could have gained selection for the Otago side but he moved to the North Island before the end of the season. He moved in the Wanganui country area and played for Hunterville and made 10 appearances for Wanganui in 1908 and 1909 including against the touring Anglo-Welsh side. He gained selection for the North Island team and played against the South Island on 25 August 1909.

He switched codes to rugby league in 1911 and represented New Zealand on the 1911 tour of Australia.

In 1936 in an article in the Manawatu Standard it was said that Milne moved to Sydney and played rugby league there "for some years" however this may have been 1912 and possibly later in the decade as he played rugby league for Opunake and the Taranaki representative side in 1913. He then played for Ponsonby United in their 1919 championship winning side. He then moved back down to the Taranaki region and played rugby for Rahotu-Okato in 1921, and Ōpunake in 1922. He was farming in the King Country area at the time of the 1936 article.
