= Tom Cotterill =

New Zealand rugby league footballer

Personal information
- Full name: Thomas Alfred Cotterill
- Born: 27 January 1884; Napier, New Zealand
- Died: 31 August 1943 (aged 59); Taradale, New Zealand

Playing information
- Weight: 81.65 kg (12 st 12.0 lb)
- Position: Second-row
Club
Years	Team	Pld	T	G	FG	P
1911–12	Clive	12	2	2	0	10
1911	Clive-Ahuriri	1	0	0	0	0
	Total	13	2	2	0	10
Representative
Years	Team	Pld	T	G	FG	P
1910–12	Hawkes Bay	6	2	0	0	6
1911–12	Napier	3	1	0	0	3
1911	New Zealand	1	0	0	0	0
- Source: papers past

Thomas Alfred Cotterill (27 January 1884 – 31 August 1943) was a New Zealand rugby league player who represented New Zealand in 1911, touring Australia. His one and only match for New Zealand was against Queensland on July 1 where he came on as an injury replacement for Ernie Asher. New Zealand won the match 24–13 in front of 7,000 spectators at the Brisbane Cricket Ground.

== Club and Hawke's Bay career ==
Tom Cotterill played for Hawkes Bay against Auckland on October 8, 1910, on the Napier Recreation Ground. Auckland won the match 19–14 with Cotterill scoring a try in the losing side. He played for the Clive club in 1911 making 10 appearances and scoring 2 tries and kicking 2 goals. He played 2 matches for Hawkes Bay both against Wanganui and 2 matches for Napier against Dannevirke. In 1912 there were few reports of matches in the local newspapers for in the club competition however the representative games were better covered. Cotterill played at least once for Napier against Dannevirke, and he made three appearances for Hawkes Bay against Wellington, the touring New South Wales side, and Canterbury. He scored the first try in Hawke's Bay's 42–9 loss to the tourists.

== Note ==
Thomas' surname is variously spelt as Cotterill, or Cottrall.
