= George Frater =

Scottish rugby league footballer

Personal information
- Full name: George Frater
- Born: 27 July 1876 Scotland
- Died: 9 October 1968 (aged 92)

Playing information
- Position: Forward
Club
Years	Team	Pld	T	G	FG	P
1896–05	Oldham	262	6	28		74
Representative
Years	Team	Pld	T	G	FG	P
≤1898–≥98	Lancashire	≥1
1904	Other Nationalities	≥1
1910	Hawke's Bay	1	0	1	0	2

George Frater (27 July 1876 – 9 October 1968) was a Scottish professional rugby league footballer who played in the 1890s and 1900s. He played at representative level for Other Nationalities (captain), and Lancashire, and at club level for Oldham, as a forward.

== Playing career ==
=== International honours ===
George Frater won a cap playing as a forward (in an experimental 12-a-side match), and was captain, for Other Nationalities in the 9–3 victory over England at Central Park, Wigan on Tuesday 5 April 1904, in the first ever international rugby league match.

=== Championship appearances ===
George Frater played in Oldham's victory in the Championship during the 1904–05 season.

=== Move to New Zealand ===
Frater leading a forward rush for Hawke's Bay against Auckland on August 19, 1911 at Victoria Park in Auckland. He was captaining the side which lost the Northern Union Cup game 17-13.

He later moved to New Zealand and was a referee in the Hawkes Bay. He played for Hawke's Bay against the touring Auckland team in 1910 in a 19-14 loss. He captained the same side in their August 19, 1911 loss to Auckland at Victoria Park in Auckland. In 1913 he refereed a match at Victoria Park in Auckland between Auckland and Nelson. In 1933 he was the selector for the Hawkes Bay representative side.
