= Frank Morse (rugby league) =

NZ international rugby league player

Personal information
- Full name: Frank Sydney Morse
- Born: 4 February 1887 Cambridge, New Zealand
- Died: 11 December 1949 (aged 62) Auckland, New Zealand

Playing information

Rugby union
Club
| Years | Team | Pld | T | G | FG | P |
|---|---|---|---|---|---|---|
| 1909–11 | Ponsonby RFC | 17 | 9 | 0 | 0 | 27 |

Rugby league
Club
| Years | Team | Pld | T | G | FG | P |
|---|---|---|---|---|---|---|
| 1911 | City Rovers | 3 | 3 | 2 | 0 | 13 |
| 1912 | United (Hamilton) |
| | Total | 3 | 3 | 2 | 0 | 13 |
Representative
| Years | Team | Pld | T | G | FG | P |
| 1911 | Auckland | 5 | 2 | 2 | 0 | 10 |
| 1911 | New Zealand | 4 | 1 | 0 | 0 | 3 |
| 1913 | Hamilton |

Frank Morse was a New Zealand rugby league footballer who represented New Zealand.

== Playing career ==
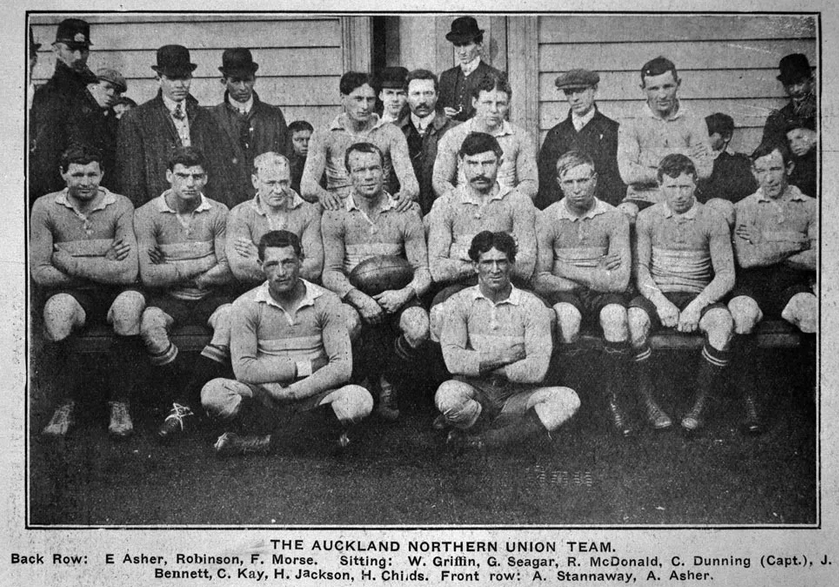
Frank Morse in the Auckland side to play Wellington on 5 August 1911.

Morse played for Auckland. He played for New Zealand when they toured Australia in 1911.

He played for the City Rovers in the 1911 Auckland Rugby League season, and also represented Auckland in the same year after switching from the rugby code where he had played for Ponsonby from 1909 to 1911.
