= Jim Johnson (rugby league) =

New Zealand rugby player (1881–1956)

Personal information
- Full name: James Joseph Johnson
- Born: 25 September 1881
- Died: 5 May 1956 (aged 74)

Playing information
- Weight: 76.2 kg (12 st 0 lb)
- Position: Forward
Club
Years	Team	Pld	T	G	FG	P
1911–12	Ahuriri	15	0	0	0	0
1911	Ahuriri-Clive	1	0	0	0	0
	Total	16	0	0	0	0
Representative
Years	Team	Pld	T	G	FG	P
1911–12	Napier (sub-union)	2	0	0	0	0
1911–12	Hawke's Bay	6	3	0	0	9
1913	New Zealand	1	1	0	0	3

James Joseph Johnson (25 September 1881 – 5 May 1956) was a New Zealand professional rugby league footballer who played in the 1910s. He played at representative level for New Zealand, and Hawke's Bay, as a forward.

== Playing career ==
=== Club career and Hawke's Bay side ===
In 1911 Johnson played for Ahuriri in the inaugural Hawke's Bay club competition. He played 2 matches for Hawke's Bay, one of which was against Auckland at Victoria Park. He scored a try in a 17-13 loss. He also played one match for Napier against Dannevirke. In 1912 he played for Napier against Danevirke and played in 4 matches for Hawke's Bay against Auckland, Hamilton, New South Wales, and Canterbury. He scored a try against Auckland and another against the New South Wales side, while adding a goal in their match with Canterbury.

=== International honours ===
Johnson represented New Zealand in 1913 against New South Wales.
