= Roy Siddells =

New Zealand international rugby league footballer

Personal information
- Full name: Charles Gordon Roy Siddells
- Born: 7 May 1891
- Died: 24 December 1947 (aged 56)

Playing information
- Weight: 11 st 6 lb (73 kg)
- Position: Centre
Club
Years	Team	Pld	T	G	FG	P
1912–14	Eastern (Wanganui)	17	13	22	0	83
Representative
Years	Team	Pld	T	G	FG	P
1911–14	Wanganui	15	12	10	0	56
1911–13	New Zealand	8	2	0	0	6
1911	Wellington	1	0	0	0	0
1911	Hawkes Bay	1	0	0	0	0
1912	Taranaki	1	0	0	0	0

Charles Gordon Roy Siddells (7 May 1891 – 24 December 1947) was a New Zealand professional rugby league footballer who played in the 1910s. He played at representative level for New Zealand (non-Test matches). He predominantly played for Wanganui, but also played single matches for Wellington, Hawkes Bay, and Taranaki. While at club level he played for the Eastern club in Whanganui from 1912 to 1914, as a centre.

== International honours ==
Roy Siddells was a member of the 1911 New Zealand rugby league tour of Australia during the 1911 New Zealand rugby league season. During the 1913 tour of New Zealand by New South Wales, Siddells played against the touring party for New Zealand in two matches.

== Domestic representative teams ==
With the game in its infancy Siddells was called on to play for several representative teams despite not actually living in those provinces. In 1911 he played for Wanganui in April, Wellington on 5 August, and then 2 weeks later for Hawkes Bay against Auckland. Then he played 2 further matches for Wanganui before the season ended. In 1912 he played 5 matches for Wanganui but also represented Taranaki against the touring New South Wales side on 29 August.

== Honoured at Petone Panthers ==
Roy Siddells was named as a Centre in the Petone Panthers' Team of the Century in 2012. Although there is no indication that he ever played for them. The only match he played for Wellington rugby league was as a guest player in 1911 a week after he returned from the New Zealand tour of Australia.
