= Bert Feary =

New Zealand international rugby league footballer

Personal information
- Full name: Bertram Edward Feary
- Born: 3 December 1885
- Died: 26 May 1952 (aged 66)

Playing information
- Position: Forward
Club
Years	Team	Pld	T	G	FG	P
1911–13	Albion
Representative
Years	Team	Pld	T	G	FG	P
1910–13	Nelson	9	0	0	0	0
1911	New Zealand	3	0	0	0	0
1911–12	Golden Bay	3	0	0	0	0

Bertram Edward Feary (3 December 1885 – 26 May 1952) was a New Zealand professional rugby league footballer who played in the 1910s. He played at representative level for New Zealand, and Nelson, as a forward.

== Playing career ==
=== Nelson and Golden Bay ===
Bert Feary switched codes in 1910 and played a match for Nelson against the touring Auckland side at Trafalgar Park. Auckland won 24–13. In 1911 he played for the Albion club in the fledgling Nelson competition. On 29 July he played for Golden Bay against Nelson and then in August he was selected for the Nelson team to tour the North Island. He played against Auckland on 10 June at Victoria Park, Auckland with Nelson going down 36–12. He then played against Taranaki at Eltham in a 16–8 defeat before playing Wanganui at Cooks Gardens in a heavy 40–0 loss.

In 1912 Feary played twice for Golden Bay. The first match was a 20–7 loss against the touring Wanganui side on 5 April and the second was on 27 July against Nelson and resulted in a 27–7 win. He also played for Nelson against Wellington on 8 June at St Patricks College in Wellington. Wellington won 19–6 in extremely poor weather. His last representative match of the season was for Nelson against Marlborough on 12 October. The match was played in Blenheim with Nelson winning 21 to 6.

1913 saw Feary playing 3 further matches for Nelson. The first was against Marlborough at Trafalgar Park with Nelson winning comfortably 35–0. He then played against Auckland at Victoria Park before 2,500 spectators. Nelson went down 16–2. His final match was against the touring New South Wales who trounced Nelson 66–2 with 1,500 in attendance at Trafalagar Park. With the outbreak of war rugby league ceased to be played in the region and after the war Feary became involved in rugby union.

== International honours ==
He was nominated for the New Zealand team by the Nelson union along with teammate Dave Mason. Feary represented New Zealand in 1911, touring Australia. He played for the New Zealand team against Auckland at the Takapuna Racecourse prior to the teams departure and played in 2 matches in Australia.
