= Tasman rugby league team =

Rugby team in New Zealand

Club information
- Nickname(s): Titans, Orcas
- Founded: 1995

Current details
- Coach: Stuart Esera
- Competition: New Zealand Rugby League

Records
- Rugby League Cup: 2001-02
- Mainland Super 10: 2000
- South Island Zone: 2012

The Tasman rugby league team are a New Zealand rugby league team that represents the Tasman Rugby League. They have previously been nicknamed the Orcas but in 2010 adopted the Titans nickname. The district was previously known as Nelson/Marlborough.

== History ==
=== Early years ===
Nelson held one of the first New Zealand rugby league competitions in 1910 and the region produced four New Zealand representatives between 1910 and 1911; Charles James, Pat Hannigan, Dave Mason and Bert Feary. In many parts of New Zealand, rugby league went into recess with the outbreak of World War I.

In 1991 Nelson, who were coached by former Kiwi Kevin Dixon, played a three match series against Marlborough, winning the first 30-20 before losing the second 24-32 and drawing the third match 26-all.

=== Tasman district ===
A Nelson-Marlborough side first played as an independent district in 1977, who played Otago, Southland, West Coast, Canterbury etc but it was not until the 1997 season that the Tasman name was adopted. In 1998 they won the Central Zone of the National Provincial Competition Second Division before losing to Otago in the semi-finals.

In 2000 the team competed in the Mainland Super 10 against other South Island district teams and clubs from the Canterbury Rugby League. The Orcas made the final and defeated Hornby 20-0 to win the championship.

In 2001 Tasman won the Rugby League Cup, defeating Coastline. They lost to trophy to Otago in the first game of the 2002 season.

In 2004 the Orcas defeated the touring Russian national team 32-16.

In 2010 the Tasman side lost two matches against the West Coast, 4-36 and 14-56.

In 2011 Tasman will compete in a South Island home-and-away series against West Coast, Canterbury, Otago and Southland.

=== Notable players ===
During the 1990s and early 2000s Tasman were coached by Paul Bergman who later went on to coach Wellington and be an assistant coach of the New Zealand national rugby league team. Former internationals Phil Bergman (Paul's brother) and Simon Angell have also represented Tasman.
