= David Evans (rugby, born 1886) =

New Zealand rugby player

Dave Evans
Personal information
- Full name: David Alexander Evans
- Born: 4 October 1886 Napier, New Zealand
- Died: 12 October 1940 (aged 54) Napier, New Zealand

Playing information
- Weight: 86.64 kg (13 st 9.0 lb)

Rugby union
- Position: Lock, Flanker
Club
Years	Team	Pld	T	G	FG	P
	Napier RFC
Representative
Years	Team	Pld	T	G	FG	P
1906–10	Hawke's Bay	19
1910	New Zealand	1	0	0	0	0

Rugby league
- Position: Second-row
Club
Years	Team	Pld	T	G	FG	P
1911–12	City (HBRL)	13	3	1	0	11
1911	City-Kia Ora (HBRL)	1	0	0	0	0
	Total	14	3	1	0	11
Representative
Years	Team	Pld	T	G	FG	P
1911–12	Hawke's Bay	5	1	2	0	7
1911	Napier (sub-union)	1	0	0	0	0
1912	New Zealand	5	0	0	0	0

David Alexander Evans (4 October 1886 – 12 October 1940) was a New Zealand dual-code international rugby player who represented New Zealand in both rugby union and rugby league.

== Playing career ==
=== Rugby union ===
Evans began his career playing rugby union and represented Hawke's Bay 19 times from 1906. He made the 1910 New Zealand tour of Australia and played in the 0–11 Test defeat by Australia at the Sydney Cricket Ground on 27 June 1910, becoming the Hawke's Bay's third representative.

=== Rugby league ===
While in Australia, Evans had been impressed by the rugby league code and, in 1911, he was instrumental in helping to persuade three Hawke's Bay clubs – Clive, Ahuriri and Kia Toa – to switch en masse to rugby league. A Hawke's Bay rugby league team representative, he represented New Zealand on the 1912 tour of Australia, where no test matches were played. He played 5 matches for New Zealand on the tour.

He played for the City club in the inaugural Hawke's Bay rugby league competition in 1911 playing 11 matches and 1 match for a combined City-Kia Ora team against Clive-Ahuriri for charity. In the same season he played three matches for Hawke's Bay (two against Wanganui and one against Auckland). He also played a match for the Napier team against Dannevirke. In 1912, he played for Hawke's Bay against Wellington and then against the touring New South Wales rugby league team.
