= George A. Gillett =

NZ & Australia international rugby league footballer and coach

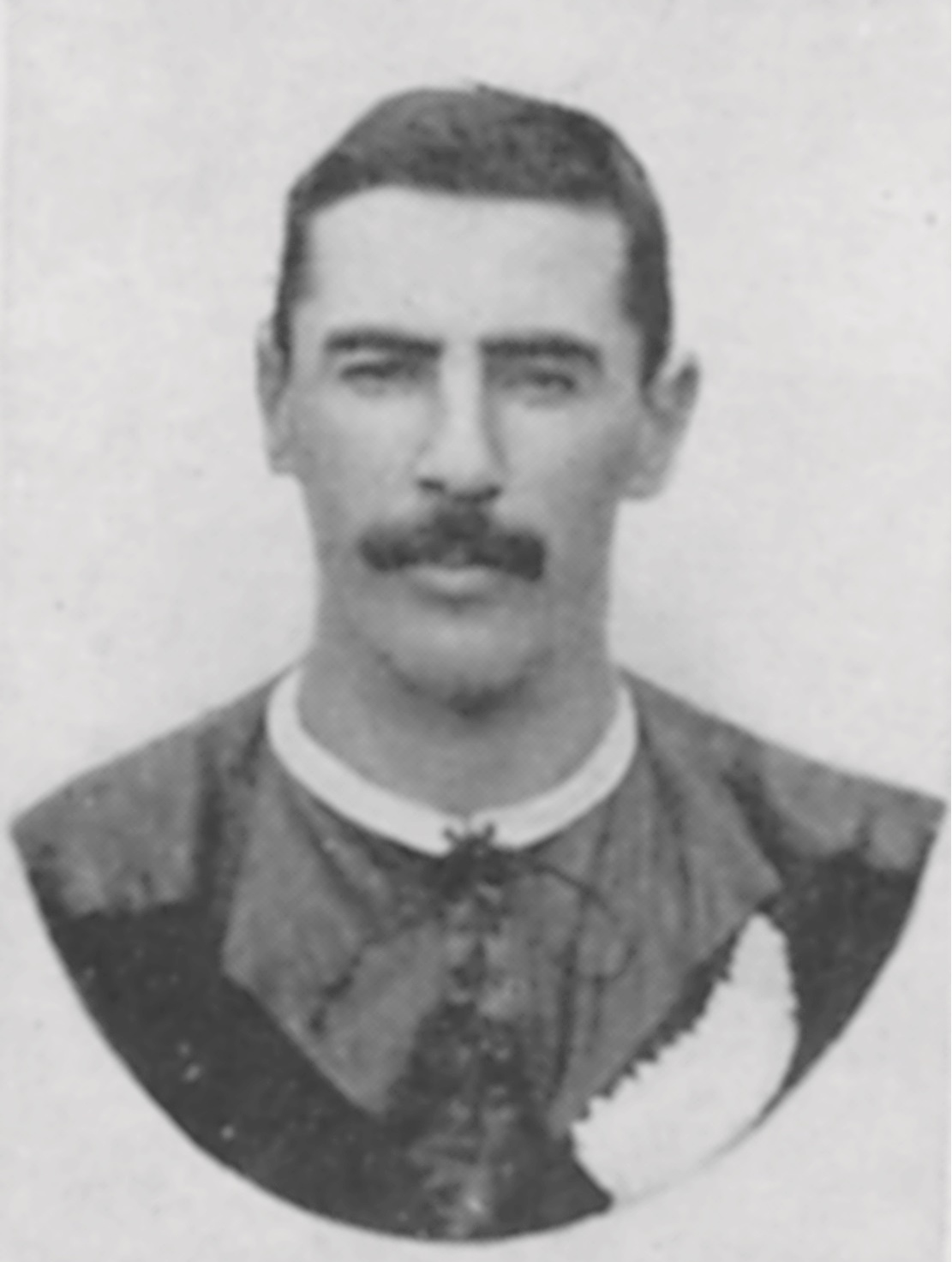
- Gillett in 1905

Personal information
- Full name: George Arthur Gillett
- Born: 23 April 1877 Leeston, New Zealand
- Died: 12 September 1956 (aged 79) Auckland, New Zealand

Playing information
- Height: 1.83 m (6 ft 0 in)
- Weight: 83 kg (13 st 1 lb)

Rugby union
- Position: Fullback
Club
Years	Team	Pld	T	G	FG	P
1905–08	Auckland
Representative
Years	Team	Pld	T	G	FG	P
1905–08	New Zealand	38 (8)	4 (1)	14 (2)	0	41 (7)

Rugby league
- Position: Fullback
Club
Years	Team	Pld	T	G	FG	P
1911–12	Newton Rangers	4	1	2	1	9
1914	Ponsonby United	4	0	0	0	0
	Total	8	1	2	1	9
Representative
Years	Team	Pld	T	G	FG	P
1911	New Zealand	8 (1)	2	0	0	6
1911–12	Australia	4	0	0	0	0
1912	Auckland	1	0	0		0

Coaching information
Representative
Years	Team	Gms	W	D	L	W%
1912	New Zealand	1	0	0	1	0

George Arthur Gillett (23 April 1877 – 12 September 1956) was a New Zealand multi-code footballer of the early 20th century and a dual-code rugby international. Gillett died in 1956 in Onehunga.

== Early years ==
Born in Leeston, Gillett received his education at Hamilton East School and went on to represent Thames, and then Auckland in rugby union in 1899.

== Australian rules football ==
After serving in the South African war in the Australian forces, he lived in Kalgoorlie and whilst there played Australian rules football and was a member of the Western Australia state team.

== Return to New Zealand and rugby union ==
Gillett returned to New Zealand in 1905 where he lived in Christchurch and played for the Merivale club. He was selected for the 1905–06 Original All Blacks tour without having played a game for Canterbury. On that tour he played 25 of the 35 matches including his first Test cap for New Zealand on 18 November 1905 against Scotland and the famous Match of the Century against Wales. In total he played 30 matches during the period of 1905 to 1908 including eight Tests.

Gillett made an Australian rules appearance at the 1908 Melbourne Carnival, representing New Zealand in Australian rules for the first time.

== Rugby league ==
Gillett joined the Newton Rangers in the Auckland rugby league competition. He played for them in 1911 and 1912. After switching to rugby league Gillett played for New Zealand against Auckland and scored a try. He then toured Australia with the 1911 New Zealand national team playing in 7 matches, which were played against the New South Wales and Queensland state teams, and acted as selection games for the combined 1911-12 Australasian team for the tour of Britain. Gillett was one of four New Zealanders who were selected for this combined team. He only played in four of the 35 tour matches and but no Tests. Gillett coached the 1912 New Zealand side who played the touring New South Wales team. Remarkably he did not play a single game of club rugby league or a single game for Auckland.

Gillett later became the New Zealand Rugby League's official organiser, helping to promote the game particularly in the Thames and Wellington areas.

In 1914 he attempted to switch from Newton Rangers to City Rovers but was denied by the league and his Newton Rangers club. He later tried to join Ponsonby United and after initially being refused his application was eventually accepted. He played 4 matches for them at the end of the season and then retired from the game. In the same year he was also the coach of the newly formed Remuera League Football Club.

In 1938 he donated a trophy to the Auckland Rugby League. It was decided to award it to the winner of the 4th grade competition which in its first season was the City Rovers side.

== Heroism ==
On 27 July 1908, the touring Anglo-Welsh team were departing from Auckland by ship when one of their players, Percy Down, fell overboard. Gillett, along with Arthur 'Bolla' Francis and two others, dived into the water and kept Down afloat until a rope was lowered from the ship.
