= Reg Sprague =

New Zealand international rugby league footballer

Personal information
- Full name: Ernest Reginald Sprague
- Born: 7 May 1886 Millom, Cumbria, England
- Died: 22 November 1972 (aged 86) Rothesay Bay, Waitakere, New Zealand

Playing information
- Weight: 69.9 kg (11 st 0 lb)

Rugby union
- Position: wing
Club
Years	Team	Pld	T	G	FG	P
1908	Wairoa
1910	Ngaruawahia	4	2	1	0	9
	Total	4	2	1	0	9
Representative
Years	Team	Pld	T	G	FG	P
1910	Lower Waikato	2	0	0	0	0

Rugby league
- Position: Wing
Club
Years	Team	Pld	T	G	FG	P
1911–16	Ngaruawahia	8	2	2	0	10
1913	City Rovers	1	0	0	0	0
	Total	9	2	2	0	10
Representative
Years	Team	Pld	T	G	FG	P
1911–16	Lower Waikato	9	1	5	0	13
1911	Auckland	1	1	0	0	3
1911	New Zealand	5	2	0	0	6
1913	Waikato Country	1	0	0	0	0
1913	Waikato	1	0	0	0	0
- Source: As of 3 January 2021

Reg Sprague (1886–1972) was a New Zealand rugby league player who represented New Zealand.

== Playing career ==
Sprague played for the Ngaruawahia club in its first year of existence, 1911. That same year he played for Lower Waikato. His first match was against Auckland in a 22–36 loss at Frankton in front of 400 spectators. Sprague kicked 3 conversions and a penalty. He later played for Auckland against Nelson.

He was selected for the 1911 New Zealand rugby league tour of Australia, though he played no tests on the tour. He played in a match for New Zealand prior to the tour against Auckland at the Takapuna Racecourse ground, and then 4 games in Australia against New South Wales, Newcastle, and two against Queensland.

After returning from the tour he played for Ngaruawahia, Lower Waikato twice, and for Auckland against Nelson before he then 'retired' from playing. In 1912 he refereed a match between Te Kuiti and Hamilton in Frankton. He came out of retirement in 1913. He played a match for the City Rovers side in the Auckland competition before playing for the Waikato Country side against Auckland on 28 June. He then played 4 matches for Lower Waikato against Hamilton, Rotorua (twice), and Hamilton again. He scored a try and kicked a goal in their first match against Rotorua which was for the Endean Shield and saw them win 17–0. Sprague was then selected to play for the full Waikato side to play the touring New South Wales team. They were defeated 20–14 on 4 September at Claudelands in Hamilton.

In 1914 he played for Lower Waikato against Rotorua on 4 July but with the outbreak of war there was considerably less sport being played. His final matches were in 1916 for Ngaruawahia against City Rovers on 26 August and Lower Waikato against the same opponents on 9 September at Victoria Park.

== Move to Te Aroha ==
After retiring from playing Sprague moved to Te Aroha where he became the secretary manager of the Thames Valley Electric Power Board from 1921 to at least 1950. Sprague was also chairman of the Te Aroha Building Society in 1933. He became involved in rugby in the area and refereed some matches there. He was a selector for the Te Aroha club in 1922 and in the same year was also the sole selector for the Goldfields representative team. He was a member of the Piako club and was a vice-president of the Thames Valley rugby union.

== Personal life ==
Reginald married Marjorie Lacey in 1913. They had three children, Hillary Sprague, Joan Sprague, Lacey Reginald Sprague, and Neville James Sprague.
