= Barney Winder =

New Zealand international rugby league & union player (1884-1954)

Personal information
- Full name: Charles William Winder
- Born: 15 March 1884; Thames, New Zealand
- Died: 9 August 1954 (aged 70); Hamilton, New Zealand

Playing information

Rugby union
- Position: First five-eighth, Half-back
Club
Years	Team	Pld	T	G	FG	P
1901–04	Rovers	16	2	2	0	10
1906–11	Suburbs	7	0	3	0	8
	Total	23	2	5	0	18
Representative
Years	Team	Pld	T	G	FG	P
1901–04	Thames Trial	3	0	1	0	2
1903–10	Thames Valley	20	1	10	0	30
1908–09	Auckland	4	0	0	0	0

Rugby league
- Position: Fullback
Representative
Years	Team	Pld	T	G	FG	P
1911	New Zealand	2	0	0	0	0
1912	Thames	5	1	0	0	3
1912	Thames and Goldfields	1	0	0	0	0

Charles William "Barney" Winder (15 March 1884 – 9 August 1954) was a New Zealand professional rugby league footballer who played in the 1910s. He played at representative level for New Zealand, and Thames, as a fullback.

== Rugby career ==
Winder played rugby union in the Thames area and debuted for the Rovers senior side in 1901 aged 17. He made Thames trial teams in 1901 and 1902 but didn't gain selection for the sub-union representative team until 1903 in a match against Wanganui on 12 September. In 1906 he began playing for the newly formed Suburbs club. In 1908 he was selected for a trial to select the Auckland side but was not aware he was named and along with two other Thames players did not travel to Auckland. On 8 August he did however make his debut for Auckland in a match against Marlborough. In 1909 he made three further appearances for Auckland against Wellington, Wanganui, and Maniapoto on their tour south.

== Switch to rugby league and international honours ==
In mid 1911 he chose to switch to the league code and was chosen to tour Australia. Winder represented New Zealand in 1911 on the tour of Australia and also played in Thames, Thames was a sub-league of the Auckland Rugby League at the time. He only made one appearance on tour against Queensland on 5 July in Brisbane. He then played a second time for New Zealand after they returned to New Zealand and played Auckland at the Takapuna Racecourse. He was forced from the field when he was injured making a tackle.

In 1912 he played for the newly formed Thames rugby league team in 5 matches against Goldfields, Hauraki and Auckland B. He also played in a match for Thames & Goldfields on 18 May. He refereed some representative rugby league matches over the remainder of the season and then retired from playing.
