= Dave Mason (rugby league) =

New Zealand international rugby league footballer

- Rawiri Meihana
- Born: 1888 or 1889
- Died: 5 July 1966 (aged 77)
- Rugby league career

Playing information
- Position: Prop, Second-row
Club
Years	Team	Pld	T	G	FG	P
1911	St Mary's
Representative
Years	Team	Pld	T	G	FG	P
1911–13	Nelson	8	0	1	0	2
1911	New Zealand	5	3	2	0	13
1912	Golden Bay	2

David Mason (c. 1889 – 5 July 1966), also known by his Māori name, Rawiri Meihana, was a New Zealand rugby league footballer who played in the 1910s. He played at representative level for New Zealand, and Nelson, as a forward.

== Playing career ==
=== Nelson rugby league ===
Mason was playing rugby league in the Nelson area. He was a member of the St Mary's club. In 1911 following the tour of Australia with the New Zealand team Mason was selected for the Northern Tour conducted by the Nelson representative side. He played in 3 matches, the first was against Auckland at Victoria Park before a crowd of 5,000. Auckland won 36–12 with Mason kicking a penalty. The second match was against Taranaki in Eltham which the local side won 16–8, while the third was against Wanganui at Cooks Gardens. Wanganui won 40–0 before a crowd of around 750. He played again for Nelson in 1912 against Wellington at St Patricks College in a 19–6 loss and then in July he played for Golden Bay against Nelson. This was followed on 12 October with a match against Marlborough in Blenheim which Nelson won 21 to 6. In 1913 he played 3 more matches for Nelson against Marlborough (35–0), Auckland (2–16), and the touring New South Wales side. They were thrashed 66–2 in front of 1,500 at Trafalgar Park.

=== International honours ===
He impressed the selectors and was nominated for inclusion in the New Zealand team for Australia by the Nelson union. He was subsequently selected for the 1911 New Zealand tour of Australia and played 4 matches, scoring 2 tries and kicking 2 goals. Prior to departure he made his New Zealand debut in a match against Auckland at the Takapuna Racecourse on 10 June. New Zealand won 16–14 with Mason scoring a try.

== Personal life ==
Mason was the son of Albert Mason of the Ngatitanua tribe. He was a farmer at Tākaka. Of Māori descent, he affiliated to Te Atiawa o Te Waka-a-Māui. Mason represented Nelson district Māori at many important gatherings and up until his death was president of the Takaka Tribal Committee. In 1953, he was awarded the Queen Elizabeth II Coronation Medal.

Mason died on 5 July 1966, aged 77 years, and was buried at Rototai Cemetery.
