= 1910 Auckland Rugby League season =

The 1910 Auckland Rugby League season was the first season where a full organised competition was played following the 1909 season where several exhibition club matches were played. The competition celebrated its 100th anniversary in 2010 and is currently in its 109th season. The 1910 season commenced on 14 May, with the start of the competition for the Myers Cup. It involved four teams, City Rovers, Newton Rangers, North Shore Albions, and Ponsonby United. Only Ponsonby United (now known as Ponsonby Ponies) still survive to the present day.

Two venues were used. Victoria Park, in downtown Auckland hosted 12 matches, and Takapuna Racecourse which no longer exists, hosted 4 matches.

| Preceded by 1909 | 2nd Auckland Rugby League season 1910 | Succeeded by 1911 |

== Meetings and news ==
=== ARL annual meeting ===
At the Auckland Rugby League annual meeting the following committee was elected:Chairman, Mr Barry Brigham; Hon Secretary, Mr A.J. Powley; hon treasurer, Mr Percy Usher; hon auditors, Mr D.W. MacLean and E.W. Watts; president, Mr C.D. Grey; vice-presidents, Mr F.E.N. Gaudin, M. Molloy, W.T. Thompson, J. Patterson, W.M. Evans, T. Craig, A.E. Glover MP, T. Buxton. At the meeting information was received that two new clubs were forming, one in the city and the other at a marine suburb.

=== City Rovers Establishment ===
On 12 April a meeting was held at the Waitemata Hotel with a view to forming a club. There were 23 people in attendance with Mr. D. W. MacLean occupying the chair. It was decided that a club would be formed called City Rovers. The following were elected as officers: president, Mr. J Endean; vice-presidents, Mr F. E. N. Gaudin; Josiah Graham, A. J. Parker, and W. M. Evans; hon secretary, Mr L. E. Hinton; hon treasurer, Mr Ernest Asher; hon auditor, Mr B. Brigham. Players for the team were requested to travel to the North Shore on the following Saturday to practice with the North Shore Albions team. The match resulted in a draw with both teams scoring three tries each.

=== Newton Rangers ===
On the evening of 5 May Newton held a meeting at the Caledonian Hotel with Mr. W. Mulholland presiding. Twenty one playing members were present "and much enthusiasm was shown". The following officers were elected:- President, Mr. J.J. Molloy; vice-presidents, Messrs. W. Jones, J.E. Hunt, J. Fernandez, H. McNeil, R. Gordon, E. Hall Skelton, R. Robinson, J. Boonstra, D. Simpson, F.E. Baume, M.P., and A. Raynes; captain, Mr. William Mackrell; vice-captain Samuel B. Houghton; hon. secretary, Mr. G. Smith; treasurer, Mr. W. Mulholland; auditors, Messrs. M. Hooper and E.W. Watts; management committee, Messrs. Bradburn, Hooper, Samuel Houghton, Farrant, Winter, Smith, and Mulholland; delegates to Auckland league, Messrs. Linkhorn, Smith, and Mulholland; delegate on management committee of Auckland league, Mr. P. Linkhorn; selectors, Messrs. Mackrell, Houghton, and Bradburn. The club decided to adopt the colours of maroon and white. Samuel Houghton was the son of Joseph Houghton, the former chairman of Northern Union before the family migrated to New Zealand.

=== Northcote Ramblers join the Northern Union Code ===
On 15 April a meeting was held at Northcote to form a rugby league club there. There were 37 players and supporters present. Mr. D. W. MacLean chaired the meeting. 21 players enrolled at the new club. Mr Lepper was appointed hon secretary, and Mr A. Jackson treasurer. The club was initially to be called the Northcote Warriors however within a week this was changed to the Northcote Ramblers which they were known as for decades afterwards. Today the club is known as the Northcote Tigers. The team played their first ever match on 23 April when they took on a combined Newton Rangers and Ponsonby United junior team in Northcote. The home team won by 18 points to 8 with Jack Stanaway refereeing.

=== Myers Cup (First Grade Championship) ===
Sixteen matches were played until the final round on 20 August where City Rovers defeated Ponsonby United to become the inaugural champions of Auckland club Rugby League (which at this time was referred to as 'Northern Union' in the media). The Round 4 match between North Shore and City won by City 12–6 did not have the point scorers reported. In the Round 6 match between Ponsonby and City the match was abandoned after Albert Opai Asher led the City team off the field after protesting the non awarding of a 'try' to the City team. After an inquiry by the league during the week Asher apologised.

== Senior competition ==
=== Statistics ===
There were 16 first grade games played with 69 tries, 24 conversions, and 10 penalties. The average number of points per game was 18.3, with 4.3 tries per game. With 24 conversions from 69 attempts the successful percentage was 35.

=== Final standings ===
| Team | Pld | W | D | L | F | A | Pts |
|---|---|---|---|---|---|---|---|
| City Rovers | 8 | 5 | 2 | 1 | 87 | 33 | 12 |
| Newton Rangers | 8 | 4 | 1 | 3 | 76 | 81 | 9 |
| Ponsonby United | 8 | 4 | 0 | 4 | 89 | 60 | 8 |
| North Shore Albions | 8 | 1 | 1 | 6 | 41 | 119 | 3 |

=== Results ===
==== Round 1 ====
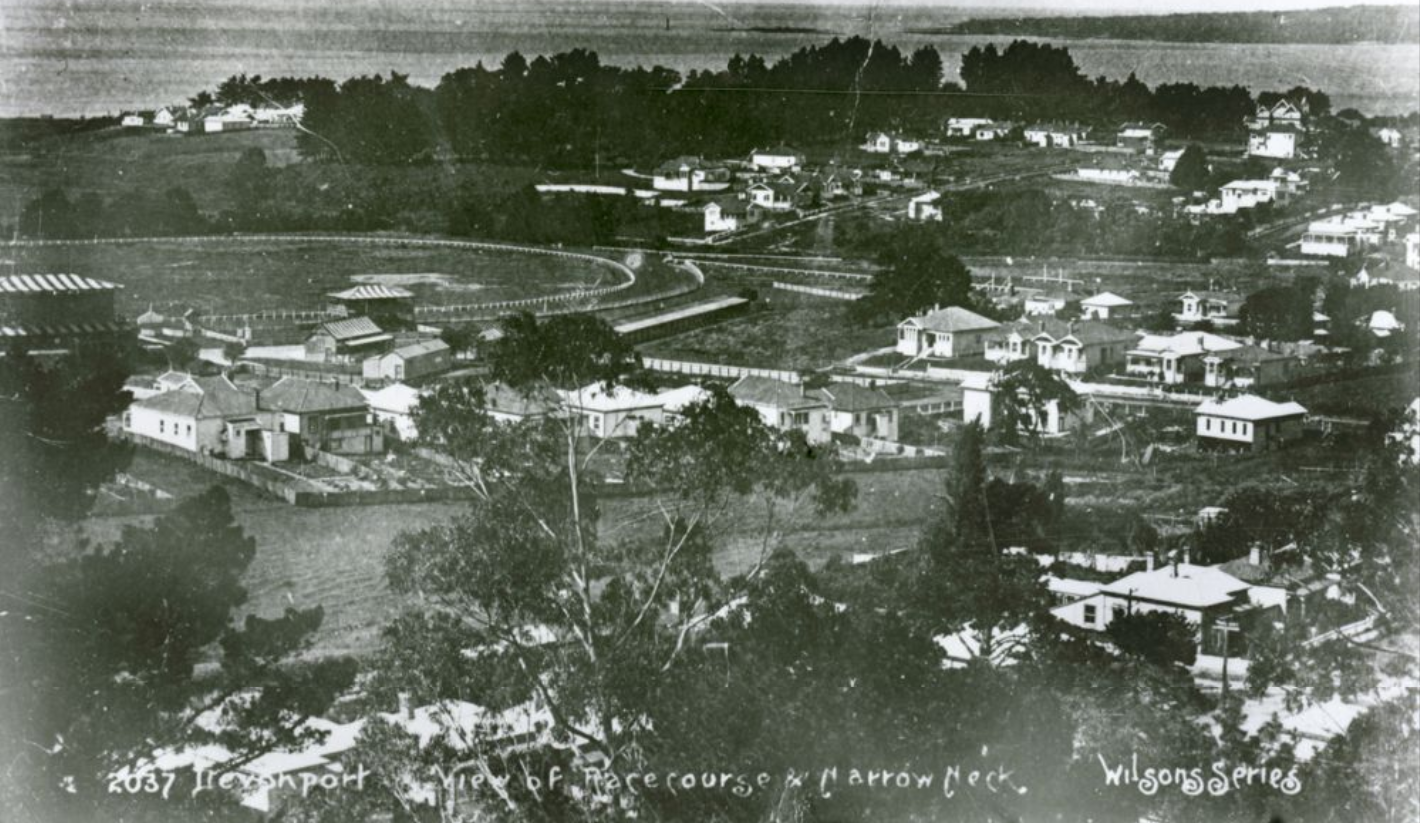
Takapuna Racecourse to the left.

Hugh Gordon Haswell, one of Newton's try scorers.

The North Shore v City match was played on the Takapuna Racecourse. Bob Mitchell likely made his debut for City in the 0-0 draw at the ground. He went on to play 29 games for Auckland over 5 years and also 8 games for New Zealand from 1912 to 1914. Hugh Gordon Haswell scored a try for Newton in their 12-6 win at Victoria Park. He had played for Auckland B in their loss to Rotorua the previous season. Haswell later fought in World War 1 and was killed on November 14, 1917 in Jaffa, Palestine at the age of 30.

| 14 May | Newton | 12–6 | Ponsonby | Victoria Park |
| | Try: William Winter, Hugh Gordon Haswell, Len Farrant 2 | | Try: Sid Riley, Sydney Cole | Referee: Mr. R.J. Sharrock |

| 14 May | North Shore | 0–0 | City | Takapuna Racecourse |
| | | | | Referee: William Wynyard |

==== Round 2 ====
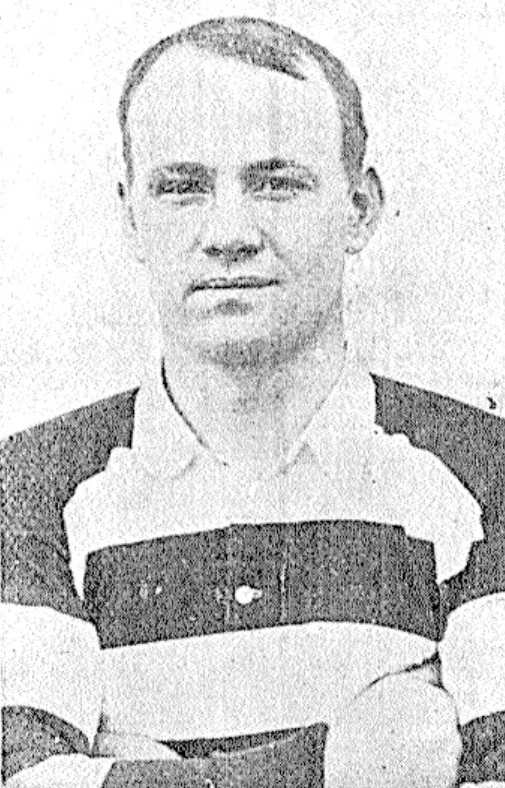
Ronald MacDonald

Harold (Ray) Denize scored the first ever points for City in their 8-8 draw with Newton. He would go on to play for them for several seasons being one of the mainstays in their forward pack.

| 21 May | Newton | 8–8 | City | Victoria Park |
| 2:00 | Try: Dick Bradburn, William Bonner; Con: Dick Bradburn | | Try: Harold Denize, A Hawthorn; Con: Sid Kean | Referee: Jack Stanaway |

| 21 May | Ponsonby | 34–7 | North Shore | Victoria Park |
| 3:15 | Try: Arthur Carlaw 2, Scotch MacDonald 2, Ronald MacDonald 2, Henry Bettis, Sydney Cole; Con: Sydney Cole 4, Alf Chorley | | Try: Alfred Jackson; Con: George Seagar; Pen: Jim Griffen | Attendance: 300; Referee: R. J. Sharrock |

==== Round 3 ====
| 28 May | North Shore | 2–11 | Newton | Takapuna Racecourse |
| | Pen: Jim Griffen | | Try: George Smith, Thomas Houghton 2 Pen: William Bonner |

| 28 May | City | 9–0 | Ponsonby | Victoria Park |
| | Try: Charles Brett 2, Sid Kean |

==== Round 4 ====
| 4 June | Newton | 5–2 | Ponsonby | Victoria Park |
| 3:00 | Try: George Smith; Pen: William Bonner | | Pen: Sydney Cole | Attendance: 100 |

| 4 June | North Shore | 6–12 | City | Takapuna Racecourse |
| 3:00 | | | | Referee: Jack Stanaway |

==== Round 5 ====
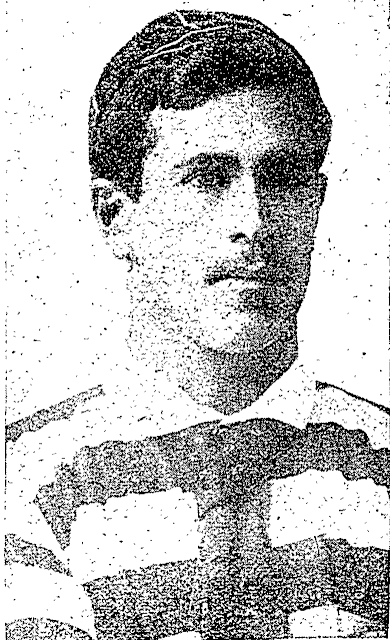
Albert Asher

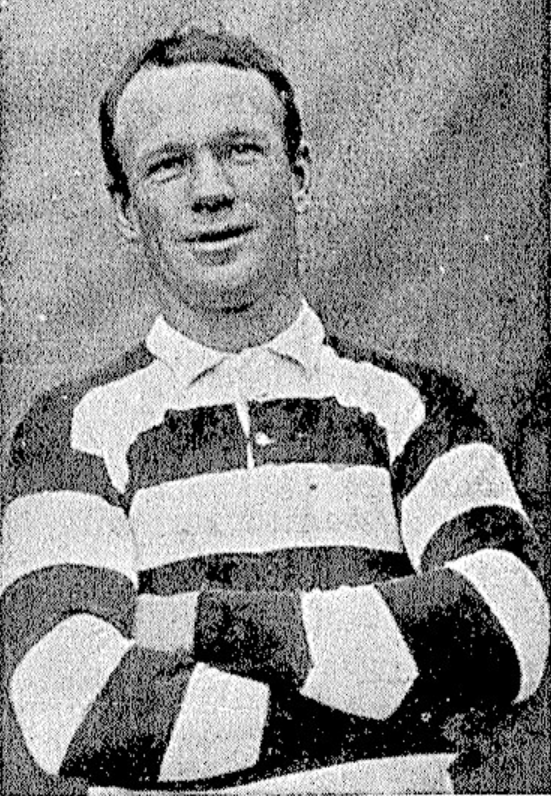
Charles Dunning

Future Kiwi, Joe Bennett was on debut for Newton Rangers. He had played a few seasons of rugby for Waiuku and club teams in that area before moving to Auckland. After one match for the City Rugby Club weeks earlier he switched codes.

| 18 June | City | 14–5 | Newton | Victoria Park |
| | Try: Albert Asher, Charles Brett, George Harrison, Bob Mitchell; Con: Sid Kean | | Try: Charles Linkhorn; Pen: Dick Bradburn | Attendance: 2,000; Referee: Alfred Jaggs |

| 18 June | North Shore | 3–7 | Ponsonby | Takapuna Racecourse |
| | Try: Fred Jackson | | Try: Charles Dunning; Con: Sydney Cole; Pen: Sydney Cole |

==== Round 6 ====
Arthur Thompson Haddon had recently joined the North Shore Albions team. It was said that he had recently played the game in the "Old Country".

| 25 June | Ponsonby | 11–8 | City | Victoria Park |
| 2:00 | Try: Claude Culpan, Ronald MacDonald, Harry Fricker; Con: Sydney Cole | | Try: Bob Mitchell, George Harrison; Con: Alex Stanaway | Attendance: 400; Referee: Jack Stanaway |

| 25 June | Newton | 16–5 | North Shore | Victoria Park |
| 3:00 | Try: Hugh Haswell, Joe Bennett 3 Con: Len Farrant; Pen: Len Farrant | | Try: Sutton; Con: Jim Griffin | Attendance: 400 |

==== Round 7 ====
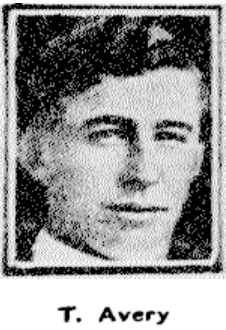
Tom Avery scored one of City's tries in their easy win.

Claude Culpan scored in his second match for Ponsonby. His brother Nelson would later be on the New Zealand Rugby League board, while another brother, Ivan, was the long time secretary of Auckland Rugby League.

| 2 July | Ponsonby | 26–2 | Newton | Victoria Park |
| 2:00 | Try: King, Fred Lynch 2, Henry Bettis, Claude Culpan, Charles Dunning; Con: Sydney Cole 4 | | Pen: William Bonner | Attendance: 4,000; Referee: W Pitts |

| 2 July | City | 22–0 | North Shore | Victoria Park |
| 3:00 | Try: George Harrison 2, Harold Denize, Tom Avery, Bob Mitchell, A Hawthorn; Con: Alex Stanaway; Pen: Alex Stanaway | | | Attendance: 4,000; Referee: R.J. Sharrock |

==== Round 8 ====
Alfred Gault, who had been playing for the City Rovers 2nd grade team was named in the starting side for the first grade. It is uncertain if he actually played or not. He was a well known boxer in this period and would later go away to World War 2 where he was killed on 26 September 1916 in France.

| 20 August | Newton | 17–18 | North Shore | Victoria Park |
| 2:00 | Try: Hugh Haswell 2, Nicholson, Henderson, Lionel Nolan; Con: William Bonner | | Try: Fraser, F Taylor, George Seagar, Hec Wynyard; Con: Hec Wynyard 2, George Seagar | Attendance: 600; Referee: Alfred Jaggs |

| 20 August | City | 14–3 | Ponsonby | Victoria Park |
| 3:00 | Try: Charles Brett 3, Albert Asher; Con: Alex Stanaway | | Try: Sydney Cole | Attendance: 600; Referee: R.J. Sharrock |

=== Top scorers ===
The Round 4 match between North Shore and City won by City 12–6 did not have the point scorers reported so the following lists are unlikely to be 100% complete with Charles Brett and George Harrison possibly adding to their point scoring.

Top point scorers
| No | Player | Team | Games | T | C | P | Pts |
|---|---|---|---|---|---|---|---|
| 1 | Sydney Cole | Ponsonby | 8 | 4 | 11 | 0 | 34 |
| 2 | Charles Brett | City | 8 | 6 | 0 | 0 | 18 |
| 3 | Hugh Haswell | Newton | 8 | 4 | 0 | 0 | 12 |
| 3 | George Harrison | City | 7 | 4 | 0 | 0 | 12 |
| 5 | William Bonner | Newton | 8 | 1 | 4 | 0 | 11 |

Top try scorers
| No | Player | Team | Games | Tries |
|---|---|---|---|---|
| 1 | Charles Brett | City | 8 | 6 |
| 2 | Sydney Cole | Ponsonby | 8 | 4 |
| 2 | Hugh Haswell | Newton | 8 | 4 |
| 2 | George Harrison | City | 7 | 4 |
| 5 | Joe Bennett | Newton | 2 | 3 |
| 5 | Ronald MacDonald | Ponsonby | 8 | 3 |
| 5 | Bob Mitchell | City | 5 | 3 |

=== 1910 Game Statistics ===
Game Statistics
| Round | Games | Tries | Con | Con % | Pen | DG | Marks | Pts | Pts per game |
|---|---|---|---|---|---|---|---|---|---|
| Round 1 | 2 | 6 | 0 | 0 | 0 | 0 | 0 | 18 | 9 |
| Round 2 | 2 | 13 | 8 | 61.5 | 1 | 0 | 0 | 57 | 28.5 |
| Round 3 | 2 | 6 | 0 | 0 | 2 | 0 | 0 | 22 | 11 |
| Round 4 | 2 | 1 | 0 | 0 | 2 | 0 | 0 | 25* | 12.5 |
| Round 5 | 2 | 7 | 2 | 28.6 | 2 | 0 | 0 | 29 | 14.5 |
| Round 6 | 2 | 10 | 4 | 40 | 1 | 0 | 0 | 40 | 20 |
| Round 7 | 2 | 12 | 5 | 41.7 | 2 | 0 | 0 | 50 | 25 |
| Round 8 | 2 | 14 | 5 | 35.7 | 0 | 0 | 0 | 52 | 26 |
| TOTAL | 16 | 69 | 24 | 34.8 | 10 | 0 | 0 | 293 | 18.3 |

The total number of points scored was 293 from 16 games meaning an average of 18.3 points per game, while there were 69 tries at 4.3 per game. There were 24 conversions meaning a successful conversion percentage of 35%.

- the round 4 games had 18 points unaccounted for so they may have been tries, conversions, penalties etc.

=== Second grade ===
A second grade competition was also played, however it received little coverage in the news media. It featured second teams from City Rovers, North Shore Albions and Ponsonby United, as well as a team from Northcote named the Northcote & Birkenhead Ramblers. Northcote were to go through the season undefeated to win the grade. On 6 June Northcote beat Ponsonby by default and North Shore beat City 12–6. On 25 June Northcote beat City 5–3. City beat Ponsonby 15-0 on July 2. The points table was published in The New Zealand Herald on 3 August. There had been two rounds of play scheduled for 13 and 20 August however it appears they were not played and the final table remained as follows.

| Team | Pld | W | D | L | F | A | Pts |
|---|---|---|---|---|---|---|---|
| Northcote & Birkenhead Ramblers | 7 | 7 | 0 | 0 | 112 | 18 | 14 |
| North Shore Albions | 7 | 5 | 0 | 2 | 54 | 37 | 10 |
| City Rovers | 7 | 2 | 0 | 5 | 36 | 80 | 4 |
| Ponsonby United | 7 | 0 | 0 | 7 | 9 | 110 | 0 |

On 27 August the Northcote side played a combined team from the other 3 sides at Victoria Park and was defeated 14 to 5.

== Representative season ==
=== Auckland v Rotorua ===

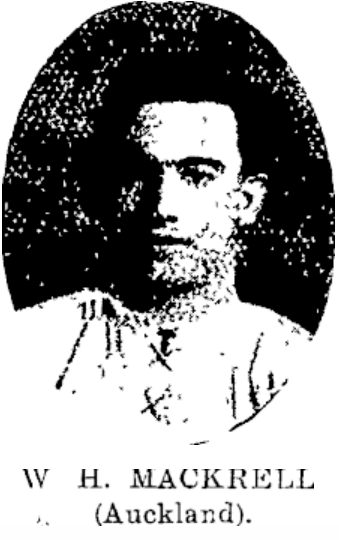
William Mackrell, the Auckland captain.

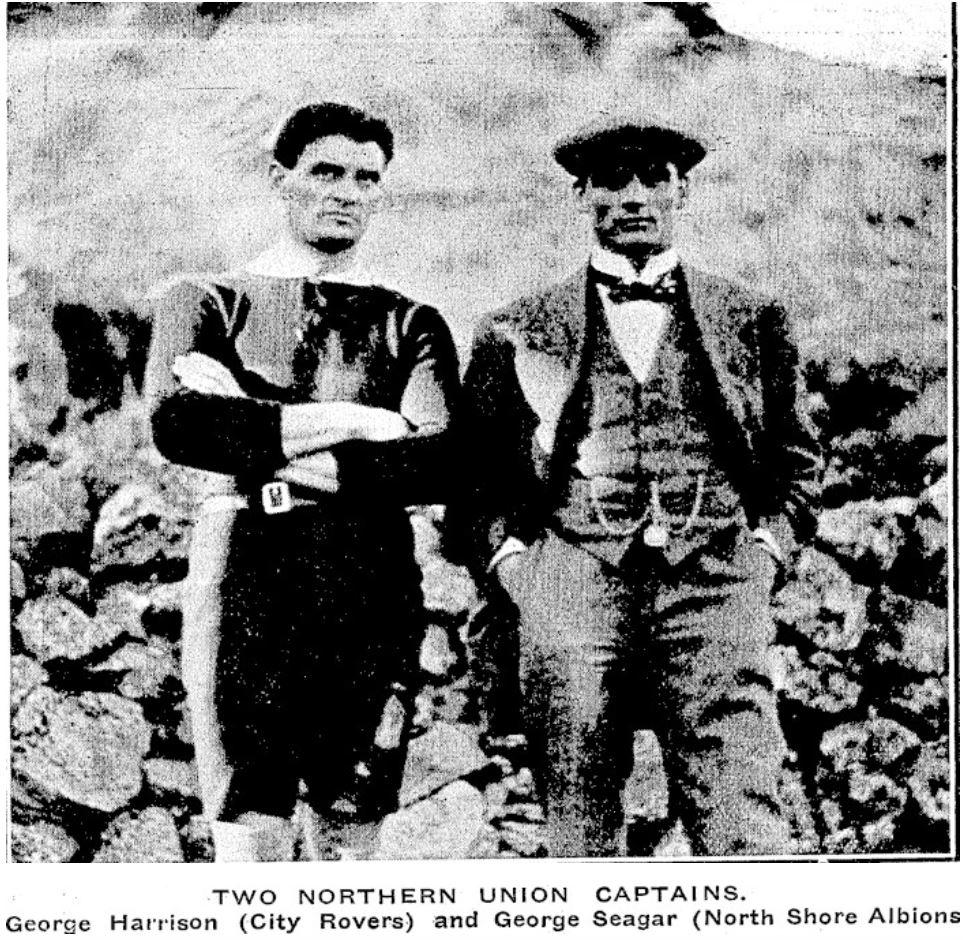
George Seagar on the right. He kicked two from three attempted goals with the third missing narrowly.

There were 2,000 spectators present and the ground was "in good order, though somewhat heavy". William Mackrell, the Auckland captain won the toss from Rotorua's Frank Woodward who had played for Auckland the previous season. A. Worrall kicked off for Rotorua into a slight wind. Auckland was wearing all black while Rotorua were in red and black. Both teams moved the ball up and down the field with several attacking movements and the Rotorua side were impressing with their backs throwing the ball about which was "a treat to witness". Eventually Auckland took play into Rotorua's end and play became concentrated there. Charles Dunning, Auckland's prop was prominent "in some forward work, and managed to engage R. Rawson's attention", the Rotorua full back and George Smith "slipped into the opening" and scored with Jim Griffen failing to convert. Shortly after Len Farrant, who was playing in the five eighths instead of Ronald MacDonald who had been named in the initial starting side, made a "brilliant run" and passed to Alfred Jackson who ran through to score. Albert Asher took the conversion but missed. Rotorua responded and spent time moving up and down Auckland's try line before "a fine piece of work by Riki Papakura". He picked up the ball and worked the blind side of the scrum and passed to Keri McRae right on the try line and he dived over. W McCullum's conversion attempt missed but Auckland's lead was now just 6-3. After the restart play "surged up and down the field, and the pace was tremendous". In one of these movements Farrant scored for Auckland and forward, George Seagar converted from wide out. Auckland came close again through Mackrell, but then Rotorua broke away from a scrum close to their line with Papakura "dodging and feinting" through his opponents and he sent on to Henry Du Vall who was in the clear but Ernie Asher managed to pull him down before he reached the line. Auckland immediately took play back downfield and after some loose play Seagar scored and Farrant converted to give Auckland a 16-3 halftime lead. Both teams attacked well in the open but Rotorua's chief weakness was said to be not tackling low enough. Farrant scored again after Albert Asher had made an opening and the try was scored in the right corner with Seagar making a good effort with the conversion but missing. Rotorua then had a period of dominance and scored three tries in quick succession. Keri McRae broke away in loose play to score in the right corner and A Worrall converted from a difficult angle, then a minute later Woodward gathered up the ball and "dodged past three men and massed to W. McCullum who scored though McRae's conversion missed. Then "amidst intense excitement" Papakura, who had moved to full back from half back made a break and passed to Woodward to Du Vall who dived across. McCullum's conversion made the score 19-16 in favour of Auckland. The Auckland Star writer said that "the two teams gave a great exhibition of the Northern Union game. The play was chock-ful of interesting incident, and the pace was tremendously hot". The Asher brothers "were responsible for some exceptionally fine work" in the three-quarters and Opai (Albert) went close to scoring. Papakura was playing a very safe game at full back for Rotorua and he put them on attack with a big kick. Soon after they were awarded a free kick and McCullum sent it through the posts to make the margin one point (19-18). Despite the game being in its late stages the passing and pace was as good as it was at the start. Auckland finished the game attacking the line and were given a free kick which Seagar kicked and the game finished with the home side in front 21-18.

| 11 June | Auckland | 21–18 (16-3) | Rotorua | Victoria Park, Auckland |
| 3:00 | Try: Len Farrant 2, Alfred Jackson, George Seagar, George Smith; Con: George Seagar 1/2, Len Farrant 1/1, Jim Griffen 0/1, Albert Asher 0/1; Pen: George Seagar 1/1 | | Try: Riki Papakura, Keri McRae, W McCullum, Henry Du Vall; Con: A Worrall 1/1, W McCullum 1/2; Pen: W McCullum 1/1 | Attendance: 2,000; Referee: Rowland James Sharrock |

Team details

| FB | 1 | O Miller |
| WG | 2 | Albert Asher |
| CE | 3 | George Smith |
| CE | 4 | Arthur Carlaw |
| FE | 5 | Ernie Asher |
| FE | 6 | Len Farrant |
| HB | 7 | Alfred Jackson |
| PR | 8 | Jim Griffen |
| HK | 9 | William Mackrell (captain) |
| PR | 10 | Charles Dunning |
| SR | 11 | Alex Stanaway |
| SR | 12 | Charles Linkhorn |
| LF | 13 | George Seagar |
Emergency:
| EM | 14 | Sid Riley |
| EM | 15 | William Bonner |
| EM | 16 | Harry Fricker |
| EM | 17 | Dick Bradburn |

| FB | 1 | B Rawson (10st.) |
| WG | 2 | B Harp (11st. 6lb) |
| CE | 3 | Richard John (Dick) Hastedt (9st. 10lb) |
| CE | 4 | Frank Woodward (captain) (11st. 5lb) |
| FE | 5 | Rukingi Reke (Joseph Rogers) (10st. 2lb) |
| FE | 6 | Keri McRae (12st) |
| HB | 7 | Riki Papakura (13st) |
| PR | 8 | Keri Davidson (11st. 10lb) |
| HK | 9 | Nikorima Ratete (Nikki Rogers) (11st. 10lb) |
| PR | 10 | Henry Du Vall (13st. 2lb) |
| SR | 11 | T Anderson (12st. 2lb) |
| SR | 12 | A Worrall (12st.) |
| LF | 13 | W McCullum (13st.) |
Emergency:

=== Auckland trial matches ===
On 9 July a trial match was played between an A and B team selected in preparation for the visit of the British team and refereed by R.J. Sharrock but no result was given. A further trial match was played on 16 July which the A team won by 20 points to 18. There were 2,000 spectators in attendance with the primary reason for the games to select the Auckland team to play England. The match was said to be "brim-full of interest". Fred Jackson converted all four of the A Teams tries. For the B Team Alfred Jackson and Joe Bennett each scored two tries, and William Bonner and Frederick Neighbour converted one each with Bonner also adding a penalty. The Auckland Star wrote that "one of the features of the game was a beautiful passing run between Alfred Jackson and William Bonner. From half-way, Neighbour picked up and kicked across to Bonner, who sent to Jackson. The ball passed between the pair six times, Jackson finally scoring".

| 9 July | A Team | ?-? | B Team | Victoria Park |
| 3:00 | | | | Referee: R.J. Sharrock |

Team details

| FB | 1 | Alf Chorley |
| WG | 2 | Ernie Asher |
| CE | 3 | George Smith |
| CE | 4 | Arthur Carlaw |
| WG | 5 | Sid Riley |
| FE | 6 | Ronald MacDonald |
| HB | 7 | Len Farrant |
| PR | 8 | Jim Griffen |
| HK | 9 | Fred Jackson |
| PR | 10 | William Mackrell |
| SR | 11 | Charles Dunning |
| SR | 12 | Harry Fricker |
| LF | 13 | George Seagar |

| FB | 1 | O Miller |
| WG | 2 | William Bonner |
| CE | 3 | Tom Haddon |
| CE | 4 | Lionel Nolan |
| WG | 5 | Sid Kean |
| FE | 6 | Frederick Neighbour |
| HB | 7 | Alfred Jackson |
| PR | 8 | Harold Denize |
| HK | 9 | Dick Bradburn |
| PR | 10 | Bob Mitchell |
| SR | 11 | Joe Bennett |
| SR | 12 | Alex Stanaway |
| LF | 13 | Sydney Cole |
Emergencies for both teams:
| EM | 14 | Houghton |
| EM | 14 | Hugh Haswell |
| EM | 14 | Williams |
| EM | 14 | Lynch |
| EM | 14 | H Maiki |
| EM | 14 | Tom Avery |
| EM | 14 | Henry Bettis |

For the second trial both teams trained at the Devonport football ground on the Tuesday and Thursday in preparation.

| 16 July | A Team | 20–18 | B Team | Victoria Park |
| 3:00 | Try: Albert Asher, Fred Jackson, George Smith, Jim Rukutai; Con: Fred Jackson 4/4 | | Try: Alfred Jackson 2, Joe Bennett 2 Con: William Bonner, Frederick Neighbour; Pen: William Bonner 1/1 | Attendance: 2,000; Referee: R.J. Sharrock |

Team details

| FB | 1 | Alf Chorley |
| WG | 2 | Ernie Asher |
| CE | 3 | George Smith |
| CE | 4 | Arthur Carlaw |
| WG | 5 | Sid Riley |
| FE | 6 | Ronald MacDonald |
| HB | 7 | Len Farrant |
| PR | 8 | Jim Griffen |
| HK | 9 | Fred Jackson |
| PR | 10 | Jim Rukutai |
| SR | 11 | Charles Dunning |
| SR | 12 | Harry Fricker |
| LF | 13 | George Seagar |

| FB | 1 | O Miller |
| WG | 2 | William Bonner |
| CE | 3 | Tom Haddon |
| CE | 4 | Sid Kean |
| FE | 5 | Lionel Nolan |
| FE | 6 | Frederick Neighbour |
| HB | 7 | Alfred Jackson |
| PR | 8 | Harold Denize |
| HK | 9 | Dick Bradburn |
| PR | 10 | Bob Mitchell |
| SR | 11 | Joe Bennett |
| SR | 12 | H. Maiki |
| LF | 13 | Sydney Cole |
Emergencies for both teams:
| EM | 14 | Houghton |
| EM | 14 | Hugh Haswell |
| EM | 14 | Williams |
| EM | 14 | Lynch |
| EM | 14 | Tom Avery |
| EM | 14 | Henry Bettis |

=== Auckland v Great Britain ===
Action from the game featuring James Lomas, the visiting captain, who converted seven tries.

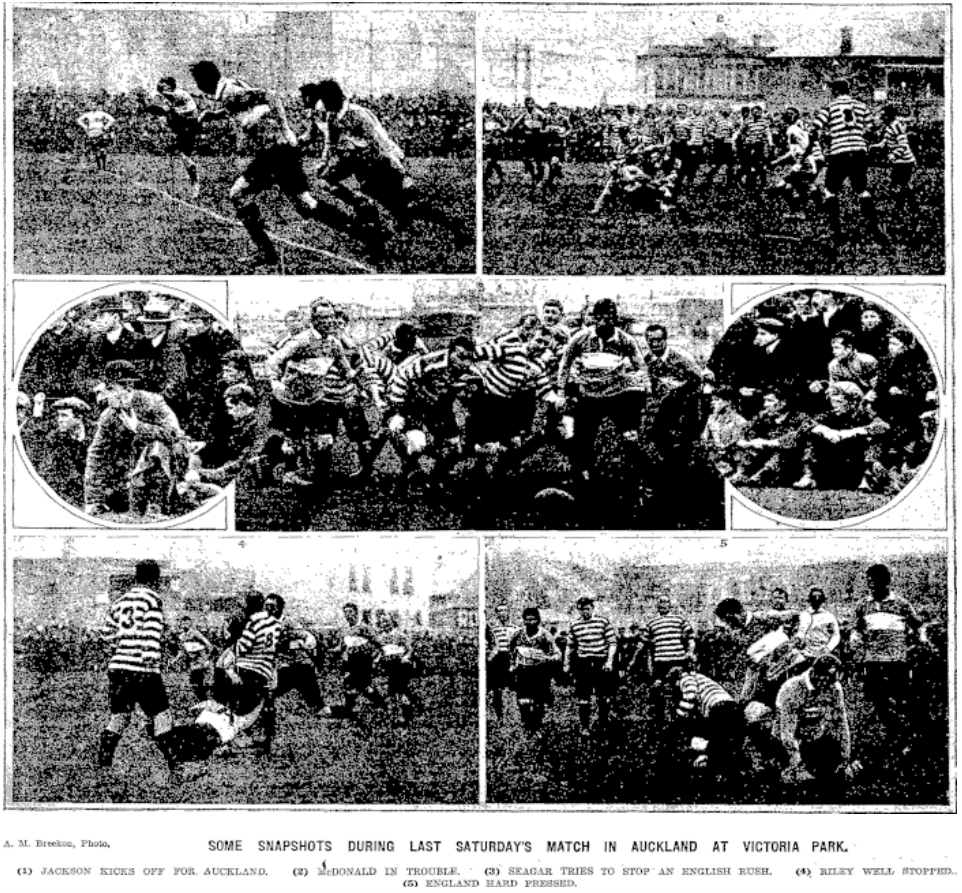

Auckland played against its first ever international opponent in their July 23 game against Great Britain at Victoria Park. There were 10,000 spectators crowded around the field and they were "highly delighted during the first half of the game at the brilliant play of the visiting team". There was a light wind from the north east, and little rain fell during the match but the ground was slippery due to the previous days' rain and a heavy shower before kickoff. The Auckland side featured Fred Jackson who had recently arrived from England and had played for Swinton in 1901-02, before then playing rugby union for several sides and then the British & Irish Lions in 1908 before moving to New Zealand where he joined the North Shore Albions club, and also Alf Chorley who had played professionally for Halifax (1895–98) and Swinton (1899-04). The British side led by 41 to 3 at half time and did not play as seriously after the break, only adding 11 points to Auckland's 6. James Lomas, the Great Britain centre and captain won the toss and decided to defend the eastern end. The New Zealand Herald writer noted that the visiting side was notably short and heavy of build, while the local players were comparatively light. Fred Jackson kicked off for Auckland. They got an attacking chance early but Alf Chorley kicked into touch on the full. Following the ensuing scrum on halfway, Lionel Nolan fielded the ball well for Auckland and cross kicked to Albert Asher, and then a rapid passing run which featured most of the Auckland team was George Seagar getting the ball last and scoring "amid tremendous excitement". Fred Jackson failed with the conversion. Great Britain responded from the kickoff and Jim Leytham nearly scored before Bert Jenkins "battled over and scored near the posts with Lomas converting. Auckland took their turn on attack and Seagar stopped Joe Riley before Charles Dunning took play to the British line but they were given a free kick for "rabbiting". Britain attacked almost immediately through their backs "but Lomas was stopped very suddenly by Albert Asher". They kept up their attack and "from a loose rush Bill Jukes scored under the posts with Lomas adding the conversion. Play surged from one 25 to the other but it was noted that the visiting backs were not playing as well as they had against New Zealand Māori at Nelson three days earlier where Albert Asher and Alex Stanaway had both played against them. Their passes were described as longer and not so sure. Nonetheless halfback Tommy Newbould secured the ball and sent a long pass out to Jim Davies who feinted, then beat several players to score with Lomas converting once more. From the resumption Leytham cross kicked and Asher dropped the ball with the British backs gaining possession and sending Riley in for a try with Lomas missing for the first time. Auckland had a chance when they worked into British territory and received a free kick when Asher was obstructed by Riley. However the visitors secured the ball from a scrum near their line and Jenkins broke through Auckland's first line of defence and passed to Leytham who ran 60 yards to score. He converted his own try and they now led 23-3. Auckland moved on to attack but Asher's run was "stopped by a clever low tackle" and Auckland's defence was criticised for being of a "collaring" nature at this stage. Seagar took a high kick well and put the ball on to his foot and was joined in the chase by Alfred Jackson and Ronald MacDonald and they took play to the British line but Chick Jenkins saved and they suddenly worked play back down field with Lomas leading the way. He passed to Davies who ran straight and passed to Riley who was tackled near the corner but dropped the ball back infield and Davies collected the ball and scored. Lomas missed the conversion. They then scored a "spectacular" try with both backs and forwards combining in a passing run which ended "amid great excitement" by Jukes scoring in the corner and Lomas "kicked a beautiful goal". Despite the scoreline Auckland was still "bravely battling against great odds, and Jim Griffen, Dunning, and Harry Fricker, dribbling the ball right to the British line, where Leytham came up fast from behind, and kicked to the dead-ball line". From the kick out the British backs were set going and Riley received the ball last and outpaced the Auckland backs to score though George Smith made a great effort to catch him. Lomas converted from wide out with "one of his peculiar left-foot screw kicks". It was now the visitors forwards turn and they "swept downfield" and overwhelmed the Auckland defence with Herbert Kershaw scoring untouched under the posts and Lomas' conversion gave them a 41-3 half time lead. The second half was even at the outset and then Auckland set up an attack on the British 25. The Auckland players were hard on attack with Lionel Nolan being prominent while Fricker made a run and was almost to the line. Auckland spent more time in the opposition half but "were nullified by the deadly English tackling". Griffen went close but once again Chick Jenkins saved. Play then moved to the Auckland line but Nolan "brought off a fine save" and then Asher received the ball from the same play and set off downfield. Rather than try to beat Riley he ran straight at him and "he received the shock of his life, and was knocked clean over by the force of the impact". Auckland players made several runs for the line and from one started by Alfred Jackson, Len Farrant sent the ball on the Asher who eluded the backs and scored though Fred Jackson failed with the conversion. After some even play Lomas gained possession near halfway and worked his way through the Auckland defence and ran in behind the posts but failed to convert. Auckland started to assert themselves a little more and George Smith made "a fine run... right through the British backs" but Jenkins saved once again. Fred Jackson should have scored soon after but failed to pick the ball up as it rolled across the try line. The visitors worked play to the centre of the field and then Billy Winstanley charged down an Auckland kick and picked the ball up and "smartly galloped the last 25 yards" to score with Lomas' conversion putting them 49-6 ahead. The British side was now said to be showing little interest and was "stood about the field". Auckland spent some time on attack but Lomas set off for the local line and when he was stopped be passed to Bert Jenkins but he was "beautifully tackled by Nolan. Play worked across field and Davies set up an attack with the Auckland backs talking with "feeble efforts" and he scored after receiving the ball once more. Lomas missed the conversion but they had passed the 50 point mark. From the kickoff Auckland "dashed away" and the British backs made little effort to stop them and Alex Stanaway took the ball across the line but it was Jim Griffen who finally touched down but Fred Jackson failed to convert for the third time and the game ended.

| 23 July | Auckland | 9–52 (3-41) | Great Britain | Victoria Park |
| 3:00 | Try: George Seagar, Albert Asher, Jim Griffin; Con: Fred Jackson 0/3 | | Try: Bert Jenkins, Bill Jukes 2, Jim Davies 3, Joe Riley 2, Jim Leytham, Herbert Kershaw, Jim Lomas, Billy Winstanley; Con: James Lomas 7/11, Jim Leytham 1/1 | Attendance: 10,000; Referee: Jack Stanaway |

Team details

| FB | 1 | Alf Chorley |
| WG | 2 | Lionel Nolan |
| CE | 3 | George Smith |
| CE | 4 | Alfred Jackson |
| FE | 5 | Albert Asher |
| FE | 6 | Ronald MacDonald |
| HB | 7 | Len Farrant |
| PR | 8 | Fred Jackson |
| HK | 9 | Jim Griffin |
| PR | 10 | Charles Dunning |
| SR | 11 | Alex Stanaway |
| SR | 12 | Harry Fricker |
| LF | 13 | George Seagar |
Emergency:
| EM | 14 | Sid Riley |
| EM | 15 | Arthur Carlaw |
| EM | 16 | Joe Bennett |
| EM | 17 | Jim Rukutai |
| EM | 18 | Bob Mitchell. |

| FB | 1 | Chick Jenkins |
| WG | 2 | Jim Leytham |
| CE | 3 | Joe Riley |
| CE | 4 | Bert Jenkins |
| WG | 5 | James Lomas (captain) |
| FE | 6 | Jim Davies |
| HB | 7 | Tommy Newbould |
| PR | 8 | Fred Webster |
| HK | 9 | Billy Winstanley |
| PR | 10 | Bill Jukes |
| SR | 11 | Frank Shugars |
| SR | 12 | Albert Avery |
| LF | 13 | Herbert Kershaw |
Emergency:

=== Auckland trial match ===
On September 3 an Auckland trail was played at Devonport Domain to help the selectors choose the team for the Southern Tour. The match was one-sided and the Auckland Star said that the A Team scored nearly 50 points while the B Team only scored 15, the A Team "piled on the score with astonishing rapidity, the passing of the backs being splendid". There were no scorers mentioned.

| 3 September | A Team | 49-15 | B Team | Devonport Domain |
| 3:00 |

=== Auckland tour practice match ===
For the Auckland Combined side, effectively Auckland B, Tom Avery and Charles Brockliss scored tries. Both players were ultimately included in the touring side. It is unknown if other members of the touring side played for the B team as there was no team list published for that team.

| 17 Sep | Auckland Touring Team | 49–6 | Selected Combined Team (Auckland B) | Auckland Domain |
| 2:45 | Try: George Seagar 2, Ronald MacDonald, William Bonner 3, Sid Kean 2, Robert Mitchell 2, Charles Dunning, Harry Fricker 2, Joe Bennett, Arthur Carlaw 2 Con: Arthur Carlaw, Robert Mitchell | | Try: Tom Avery, Charles Brockliss |

Team details

| FB | 1 | Harry Childs |
| WG | 2 | Ernie Asher, William Bonner |
| CE | 3 | George Harrison, Lionel Nolan |
| CE | 4 | William Walker (Rotorua) |
| FE | 5 | Arthur Carlaw, Ronald MacDonald, Sid Kean |
| FE | 6 | Sid Riley |
| HB | 7 | Alfred Jackson |
| PR | 8 | Joe Bennett |
| HK | 9 | Sydney Cole, Charles Dunning |
| PR | 10 | Harry Fricker |
| SR | 11 | Tom Avery, Harold Denize |
| SR | 12 | Harold Oakley, Bob Mitchell |
| LF | 13 | George Seagar |
Emergency:

| FB | 1 |
| WG | 2 |
| CE | 3 |
| CE | 4 |
| WG | 5 |
| FE | 6 |
| HB | 7 |
| PR | 8 | Tom Avery |
| HK | 9 |
| PR | 10 |
| SR | 11 |
| SR | 12 | Charles Brockliss |
| LF | 13 |

== Auckland Tour ==
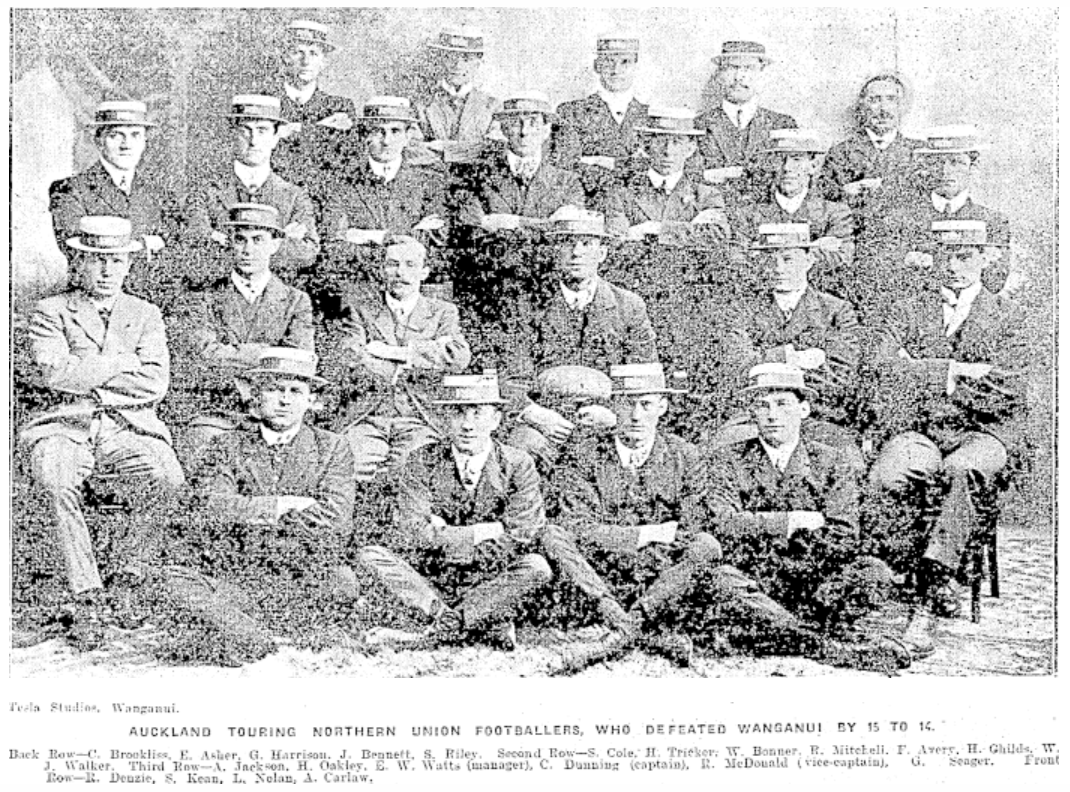
The Auckland touring team.

The Auckland squad was chosen following their trial and practice matches. Teddy Watts was the manager for the tour with Harold Oakley as his assistant. They departed on the Main Trunk Express on Tuesday 20, September. It was one of the longer tours by an Auckland side in their history with seven matches played throughout the lower North Island and South Island. The squad included fullback: Harry Childs, three-quarters, Ernie Asher, William Bonner, George Harrison, Lionel Nolan, five-eighths, Arthur Carlaw, Alfred Jackson, William Walker (Rotorua), halves, Ronald MacDonald, Sid Kean, forwards, Joe Bennett, Sydney Cole, Tom Avery, [Harold] Roy Denize, Charles Dunning, Harry Fricker, George Seagar, Harold Oakley, Bob Mitchell, and Charles Brockliss.

=== Auckland v Whanganui ===
Teddy Watts was the manager for the tour with Oakley assisting him. The first match of the tour saw Auckland play Whanganui on Thursday, September 22 at Cooks Gardens. Auckland played with the wind in the first half though it was not strong and at halftime they only led 10-8. They had scored tries to Joe Bennett and Lionel Nolan with both converted by William Bonner. For Whanganui Thomas Irwin and A. Seeling scored tries and Jack Hogan converted one of them. In the second half Wanganui attacked early with A. Gibson "dashing for the line" but he lost the ball when a try seemed certain, then another strong attack ended in Auckland forcing. Then H. Quarterman made a good attempt to drop kick a goal from midfield but just missed. Whanganui then made two more attempts to rush at the Auckland line but were stopped on the line. Auckland was winning the ball from nearly every scrum and could clear their line. Auckland centre Arthur Carlaw led a rush to the Whanganui line but lost the ball as a chance beckoned but Bonner kicked a penalty to put the visitors 12-8 in front. Whanganui "livened up" and Gibson should have scored but sent "a wild pass to R. Mitchell". From some "scrambling play which followed, Mitchell fielded the ball with one hand in marvelous fashion, and darted over" but A. Seeling missed the conversion and Auckland maintained a 12-11 lead. However Mitchell gained possession and sprinted through to get over and give the locals a 14-12 lead. Seeling took the conversion and "landed what looked to be a fine goal, one of the line umpire's flags going up, but the referee ruled no goal". Whanganui continued to have the better of the play up until a few minutes from time but Auckland broke away and George Harrison put in a fine run to the line but lost the ball before Lionel Nolan gathered it smartly and scored. The conversion missed but the game ended soon after with Auckland having snatched the victory. From the Whanganui team Jack Hogan would go on to represent New Zealand in 1913. The Whanganui Herald writer said that the best of the Aucklanders were Joe Bennett, Charles Dunning, Harry Fricker in the forwards, while Ronald MacDonald "did an immense amount of work" and Ernie Asher and George Harrison also played well. The Auckland forwards were outplayed in the loose but "knew too much about the finer points of the game for the locals and secured the ball from nearly every scrum". In the Whanganui forwards they were said to have played much better in the loose and their tackling was "deadly" with the most prominent A. Seeling, E. Lambert, B, King, and Thomas Irwin. In the backs R. Mitchell and C. Moir were the best with Herbert Quarterman safe at full back and A. Gibson showing a lot of dash on the wing. While it was noted that Auckland referee Sid Kean refereed in an impartial manner". Following the game the two teams had dinner at the Metropolitan Hotel with the Auckland team moving on to the Cosmopolitan Club where they were guests at a smoke convert. The following morning they left for Wellington before progressing on to Bluff for their next game.

| 22 September | Whanganui | 14–15 (8-10) | Auckland | Cooks Gardens, Whanganui |
| 3:00 | Try: Thomas Irwin, A Seeling, R Mitchell 2 Con: Jack Hogan 1/2, A Seeling 0/2 | | Try: Joe Bennett, Lionel Nolan, George Harrison; Con: William Bonner 2/3; Pen: William Bonner 1/1 | Attendance: 750; Referee: Sid Kean |

Team details

| FB | 1 | Herbert Quarterman |
| WG | 2 | A Gibson |
| CE | 3 | C Smith |
| CE | 4 | R Mitchell |
| WG | 5 | T McIntyre |
| FE | 6 | C Moir |
| HB | 7 | J Braid |
| PR | 8 | Thomas Irwin |
| HK | 9 | M Prideaux |
| PR | 10 | Jack Hogan |
| SR | 11 | R King |
| SR | 12 | A Seeling |
| LF | 13 | E Lambert |

| FB | 1 | William Bonner |
| WG | 2 | Ernie Asher |
| CE | 3 | George Harrison |
| CE | 4 | Arthur Carlaw |
| WG | 5 | Lionel Nolan |
| FE | 6 | Ronald MacDonald |
| HB | 7 | Alfred Jackson |
| PR | 8 | Joe Bennett |
| HK | 9 | Charles Dunning (captain) |
| PR | 10 | Harry Fricker |
| SR | 11 | Harold Roy Denize |
| SR | 12 | Tom Avery |
| LF | 13 | George Seagar |
Manager: Teddy Watts

=== Tour Match v Bluff ===
George Seagar photographed in 1910. He scored four tries in Auckland's win.

Auckland arrived by train from Dunedin the previous evening. Mr. W. Martin, the president of the Southland branch spoke at a social given to Auckland on the evening of the 26th. Both teams attended the opening bouts of the Southland Boxing Association's tournament in the Municipal Theatre as guests of the Southland Northern Union League. The Bluff team was representing the Awarua district, Ocean Beach, and Stewart Island and wore red and white. Bluff included George Burgess who played for New Zealand rugby union team in 1905 and Don Hamilton who played for them in 1908. The Bluff side had a much greater size advantage but Auckland in blue and white with their "skill and fleetness, held the game in hand throughout" and won easily by 42 points to 12 in the match played on a Tuesday. The Auckland backs "put in some dazzling runs, the ball sometimes passing through half a dozen pairs of hands and concluding in a score without having touched the ground from the moment it left the halfback". Bluff played towards the southern end with the wind behind them and quickly went on to the attack with Hamilton and F. Wilson putting in good work. Then Joe Bennett (13st 10lb) got the ball for Auckland from the opening scrum and the backs made a fine passing movement but Hamilton intercepted and cleared through a kick. Auckland created a couple of chances but it wasn't until captain Charles Dunning started a movement and handed on to Bennett who ran strongly and then fed George Seagar who scored near the posts. Bennett's kick went wide. Play was even for a time before Harry Childs, Auckland fullback started a passing movement to the western sideline and then once inside the Bluff 25, Alfred Jackson ran across at the corner with Bennett failing with the conversion once more. Auckland made a mess of the kickoff with Ronald MacDonald and Sid Kean failing to deal with the ball and Bluff took play into the Auckland 25 where Hamilton took a mark and J Johnstone kicked the goal. The Auckland backs then took play all the way to a few yards from the Bluff try line where Ernie Asher was thrown into touch after smart work initially by Arthur Carlaw started the movement. Soon after MacDonald was shouldered into touch in goal. Sid Riley and Asher had an interchange of passing and Riley scored with Asher missing the conversion. Auckland kept up the attack and moved the ball back and forth across the field with Kean finally getting over and Bennett kicking the first conversion of the day. Kean outpaced his opponents from his own half and handed it on to Seagar who passed to Harry Fricker and he scored behind the posts with MacDonald taking the kick and missing. Bluff were struggling to contain the Auckland passing movements and Carlaw took the ball from Seagar and scored behind the posts but this time Seagar missed the kick from the handy position and half time came with Auckland in front 20-2. Both teams took turns attacking before Childs tackled White "splendidly enabling Jackson to" bring the ball back into the Bluff end and a "dash" by Seagar ended in him scoring and Auckland continued their off kicking day with Bennett missing the conversion. Bluff made a nice passing movement but through a forward pass and when Hamilton seemed certain to work a try from a scrum he hung on too long with Kean and Lionel Nolan carrying play back down field. After a scrum Auckland "passed crisply through the backs and Asher touched down. Bennett missed yet another kick. Bluff finally scored a try when they had a series of scrums near the Auckland line and Burgess crossed with Johnstone converting.

George Seagar in boxing attire in 1909.

They attacked again with Wilson and P. McQuarrie but Bennett and Jackson responded and Seagar finished the movement off with his second try with Bennett missing the goal. Seagar scored again moments later after some "indifferent tackling" and Childs took the conversion but he too missed. Bluff had a period on attack with Auckland stopping them several times before Hamilton beat "the opposition badly from near the halfway and touching down close to the posts" with Johnstone converting to make the score 32-12. Both teams struggled in mid field for five minutes and then Kean made a break and Jackson scored with Kean kicking a goal from close to the posts. Bluff tried their best to score in the final few minutes but Auckland's defence held and the Auckland bacls "again got in motion from a scrum close to the home twenty five with the result that Asher was successful in touching down after a clever run" and Bennett finally kicked his second goal with time called immediately after. During the game Joe Bennett tried to hurdle a play in the Albert Asher style but was collared, "and narrowly escaped breaking his neck". George Seagar (10st 6lbs), after scoring 4 tries then went on to compete in the annual September boxing tournament at the Municipal Theatre later that evening where he beat J. O'Shea of Invercargill (11st 4lbs) with loud applause from many of his teammates who were in attendance. He then beat F. Moir (10st 8lbs) of Winton in three rounds in the welter weight section winning all three rounds. The following day he then played for Auckland again against Southland and scored another try. Unfortunately he injured his arm and was unable to compete in that night's boxing.

| 27 September | Bluff | 12–42 (2-20) | Auckland | Bluff |
| 3:00 | Try: George Burgess, Don Hamilton; Con: J Johnston 2/2; Pen: J Johnston 1/1 (mark) | | Try: George Seagar 4, Alfred Jackson 2, Ernie Asher 2, Sid Riley, Sid Kean, Harry Fricker, Arthur Carlaw; Con: Joe Bennett 2/7 Sid Kean 1/1, Harry Childs 0/1, Ernie Asher 0/1, Ronald MacDonald 0/1, George Seagar 0/1 | Attendance: 500; Referee: P Fraser |

Team details

| FB | 1 | J Johnstone (13st 8lb) |
| WG | 2 | T White (10st 7lb) |
| CE | 3 | R Thomas |
| CE | 4 | Don Hamilton (14st 0lb) |
| WG | 5 | F Wilson |
| FE | 6 | P Docherty |
| HB | 7 | George Burgess (11st) |
| PR | 8 | T West |
| HK | 9 | P McQuarrie (12st) |
| PR | 10 | A McGrath |
| SR | 11 | R Cooper (12st) |
| SR | 12 | W Rose |
| LF | 13 | N Metzger |

| FB | 1 | Harry Childs (11st) |
| WG | 2 | Ernie Asher (11st 8lb) |
| CE | 3 | Alfred Jackson (10st 6lb) |
| CE | 4 | Sid Riley (11st 5lb) |
| WG | 5 | Lionel Nolan (9st 9lb) |
| FE | 6 | Arthur Carlaw (9st 10lb) |
| HB | 7 | Sid Kean (9st 10lb) |
| PR | 8 | Charles Dunning (capt.) (13st 3lb) |
| HK | 9 | Joe Bennett (13st 10lb) |
| PR | 10 | Bob Mitchell (12st 8lb) |
| SR | 11 | Ronald MacDonald (11st 7lb) |
| SR | 12 | Harry Fricker (13st 9lb) |
| LF | 13 | George Seagar (11st) |

=== Tour Match v Southland ===
Queens Park, Invercargill. The sports fields where the match was played is just out of frame to the bottom right (south eastern corner) of the park.

Auckland's next match was just one day after the Bluff game, on Wednesday, September 28 at Queens Park in Invercargill. There were about 1,500 people in attendance and there was "much curiosity" in the match. The Southland Times wrote that "from a spectacular view point, it met with the entire approval of the onlookers. The passing movements on both sides, particularly by the visiting rearguard, resulted in the play being of such an open nature as to make the probability of scoring at any moment quite possible". Of the Southland side, H. McDermott stood out from the rest for fine all-round play. Of the Auckland side Sid Kean got the backs away "in good style" from the half back position, and Ernie Asher, Harry Childs, Alfred Jackson, Arthur Carlaw, and Lionel Nolan were said to have been involved in practically all of the attacking movements. William Bonner had replaced Sid Riley from the previous game and played at full back but was weak and got Auckland into trouble "on many occasions". In the Auckland forwards Charles Dunning, George Seagar, and Harry Fricker "were a solid trio" possession both pace and weight. Auckland kicked off from the western goal with the wind behind them. The Southland team wearing maroon and gold attacked strongly from the kickoff through George Burgess, H. McDermott, and White, before Lionel Nolan and Alfred Jackson set off for the line but M. Fraser the home fullback saved. Southland attacked again but H. Fraser knocked on and then Auckland made Southland force twice. McDermott opened the scoring for the home side when he picked up the ball on halfway and made a run before punting over Bonner's head and regathering to score "amidst applause". Don Hamilton missed the conversion. Ogg, the Southland winger fumbled the ball near the Southland line and Sid Kean obtained possession and fed Jackson who sent it to Harry Childs and he scored easily but Bonner's conversion missed. Dunning and Fricker led an Auckland attack before Ned Hughes and J. Sparks returned play the other way, but then Joe Bennett and Dunning from loose play made a move which saw Bennett score though Bonner failed with the kick once more. Neither team could score over the remainder of the half and the break came with Auckland 6-3 in front. Southland had chances on attack to open the second half but eventually Bob Mitchell and Childs shifted play to home territory and the ball went over the line with Bennett touching down and Bonner converting. Southland again spent time in the Auckland end and Dunning was penalised for lifting in the scrum with McDermott kicking a "splendid" goal. Once more the home team got good field position and Reid missed a penalty attempt but Bonnor conceded another penalty and McDermott kicked the goal this time narrowing the score to 11-7 in favour of Auckland. The Auckland backs passed well from the kickoff and put Southland in trouble but they couldn't score and Southland sent play back to halfway. From a scrum Kean got possession "and with a jinky effort made progress down the northern boundary and scored at the corner - a splendid effort which drew applause from the onlookers", though the conversion from an unnamed kicker failed. Immediately after the kickoff Ogg, the Southland winger repeated Kean's feat and outpaced the Auckland side to score "a meritorious try". McDermott added the conversion to make it a 14-12 scoreline to Auckland. Southland now "hammered away at the Auckland line" but could not come away with any points and Mitchell took the ball from his own 25 and centered up field with Seagar following fast getting possession and scoring close to the posts. Nolan missed as easy shot and full time sounded with Auckland winning 17-12. Following the game the two teams were entertained at the Princess Hotel in the evening. The president of the local league, Mr. W. Martin presided with several toasts. The general opinion was that the game was now "thoroughly organised in the Dominion and was spreading rapidly". Mr. Watts, the Auckland manager gave some details on the proposal to present a cup for competition amoung the provinces and that he hoped Southland would visit Auckland the following year. Auckland left the following day for Dunedin to play a combined Otago-Southland side on Saturday. The proceeds of the game was £97 10s 6d.

| 28 September | Southland | 12–17 (3-6) | Auckland | Queens Park, Invercargill |
| 3:00 | Try: H McDermott, Ogg; Con: H McDermott 1/1, Don Hamilton 0/1; Pen: H McDermott 2/2, Reid 0/1 | | Try: Harry Childs, Joe Bennett 2, Sid Kean, George Seagar; Con: William Bonner 1/4, Lionel Nolan 0/1 | Attendance: 1,500; Referee: P. Fraser |

Team details

| FB | 1 | M Fraser |
| WG | 2 | T White (10st 7lb) |
| CE | 3 | H McDermott (10st 8lb) |
| CE | 4 | Don Hamilton (14st 0lb) |
| WG | 5 | G Ogg (11st) |
| FE | 6 | A Reid (captain) (12st) |
| HB | 7 | George Burgess (11st) |
| PR | 8 | J Sparks (13st 7lb) |
| HK | 9 | H Fraser (11st 7lb) |
| PR | 10 | T. Moir (11st) |
| SR | 11 | J Cooper (12st) |
| SR | 12 | P McQuarrie (12st) |
| LF | 13 | Ned Hughes (12st) |

| FB | 1 | William Bonner |
| WG | 2 | Ernie Asher (11st 8lb) |
| CE | 3 | Harry Childs |
| CE | 4 | Arthur Carlaw (9st 10lb) |
| WG | 5 | Lionel Nolan (9st 9lb) |
| FE | 6 | Alfred Jackson (10st 6lb) |
| HB | 7 | Sid Kean (9st 10lb) |
| PR | 8 | Charles Dunning (capt.) (13st 3lb) |
| HK | 9 | Harry Fricker (13st 9lb) |
| PR | 10 | George Seagar (11st) |
| SR | 11 | Bob Mitchell (12st 8lb) |
| SR | 12 | Joe Bennett (13st 10lb) |
| LF | 13 | Ronald MacDonald (11st 7lb) |

=== Tour Match v Otago/Southland ===
Auckland won 30 points to 18 and were said to have "possessed better combination that Otago/Southland, their movements were faster, and their execution more finished". The game was played in two spells of 45 minutes each with the home side leading 13-11 before the visitors dominated the second half. The match was played on the Caledonian Ground in Dunedin on a "beautiful day" but the crowd was said to have been a disappointing 1,500, "the bulk of them being sports keen to see the new game". The match was refereed by Auckland touring player Arthur Carlaw. Otago/Southland won the toss and played with a fairly strong wind. Auckland made the first offensive move through some clever play by captain Charles Dunning, Bob Mitchell, and Joe Bennett took play to the home teams line but they were driven back and P. Walker scored an easy try. The conversion by McDermott missed but the combined side led 3-0. Auckland came straight on attack and centre George Harrison made "a beautiful swerving run which left Otago standing. [Lionel] Nolan took it on the right wing, and after a beautiful dash, centered to [Sid Kean], who scored a fine try". Dunning converted the effort to put Auckland in front. Auckland was "showing far more initiative, the only good point in the southerners' favour being their tackling". The wind helped then to drive Auckland back and a poor kick by Dunning into H. McDermott's hands gave the five eighths a chance and he broke through three tackles and scored. Ned Hughes converted to give them an 8-5 lead. Hughes, who had played for the All Blacks would go on to represent New Zealand at rugby league before then playing for the All Blacks once more 13 years after his first appearance for them and at the age of 40, becoming the oldest ever New Zealand rugby union representative. He was also the first ever person to play rugby league for New Zealand and be allowed to then play for the All Blacks once more. Auckland attacked smartly on the right wing and Ernie Asher got an opening and ran round the wing and full back and scored but Dunning's attempt to put Auckland in front failed. Smart forward passing by the southern side saw J. Coulter score and J. Johnstone converted. The spectators became enthusiastic about the nature of the game as "the ball traveled from end to end of the ground in thirty seconds". Harry Childs ran strongly down the middle of the field and send a long pass to George Harrison and Lionel Nolan took it on the wing and "cut in prettily and scored" but the wind saw Dunnings kick go wide and the first half finished with the home team ahead 13-11. Auckland swung straight on to attack in the second spell and "pretty passing" by Bennett, Nolan, and Kean saw the last named score and Dunning's weak kick missed but Auckland now had a lead that they would not surrender. Immediately after Bennett broke away and fooled the fullback for a "feint" and scored under the posts but Kean missed the easy conversion. The Southern side nearly scored through Thomas Mockford and then George Seagar took play back down field with a "slashing run" but a long kick went in the in goal and Johnstone who could have forced took too long and Kean racing up beat him and scored. The conversion was unsuccessful. Forwards Bryant and Manley drove over the Auckland forwards but couldn't quite reach the line but A. Harridge managed to lead a loose rush over the line to score and McDermott goaled to bring the score back to 20-18. Auckland took over from here and after nice passing Dunning scored behind the posts with Sydney Cole converting and then on full time Kean scored his fourth try after he "fooled the whole of the southern backs, side-stepping one after another and scoring under the posts" and Cole added the extra points again with the game finishing. Auckland left on the morning of the 3rd to play their next match in Nelson.

| 1 October | Otago/Southland | 18–30 (13-11) | Auckland | Caledonian Ground, Dunedin |
| 3:00 | Try: P Walker, H McDermott, J Coulter, A Harridge; Con: H McDermott 2/3, J Johnston 1/1 | | Try: Sid Kean 4, Ernie Asher, Lionel Nolan, Joe Bennett, Charles Dunning; Con: Charles Dunning 1/4, Sydney Cole 2/2, Sid Kean 0/1, Unknown 0/1 | Attendance: 2,000; Referee: Arthur Carlaw |

Team details

| FB | 1 | J Johnstone |
| WG | 2 | Thomas Mockford |
| CE | 3 | H McDermott (10st 8lb) |
| CE | 4 | P Walker |
| WG | 5 | John Ogg |
| FE | 6 | M Fraser |
| HB | 7 | J Coulter |
| PR | 8 | A Harridge |
| HK | 9 | Ernest Manley |
| PR | 10 | J Bryant |
| SR | 11 | T. Moir (11st) |
| SR | 12 | Robinson |
| LF | 13 | Ned Hughes (12st) |
Emergency: P McQuarrie
Emergency: J Sparks
Emergency: J Harry
Emergency: H Fraser

| FB | 1 | Harry Childs |
| WG | 2 | Ernie Asher (11st 8lb) |
| CE | 3 | George Harrison |
| CE | 4 | Alfred Jackson (10st 6lb) |
| WG | 5 | Lionel Nolan (9st 9lb) |
| FE | 6 | Sid Riley |
| HB | 7 | Sid Kean (9st 10lb) |
| PR | 8 | Charles Dunning (capt.) (13st 3lb) |
| HK | 9 | Joe Bennett (13st 10lb) |
| PR | 10 | Bob Mitchell (12st 8lb) |
| SR | 11 | Sydney Cole |
| SR | 12 | Harry Fricker (13st 9lb) |
| LF | 13 | George Seagar (11st) |
Emergency: Tom Avery
Emergency: W.J. Walker
Manager: Teddy Watts

=== Tour Match v Nelson ===
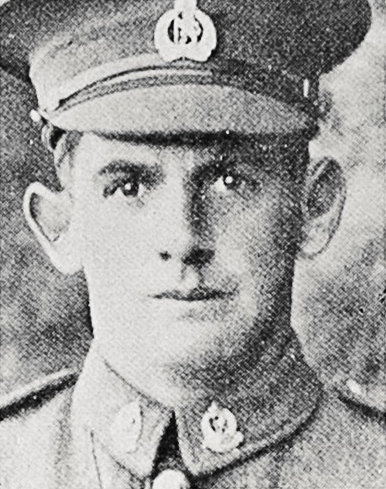
Charles James, the Nelson centre who represented New Zealand in 1911 and was killed in World War 1 in France.

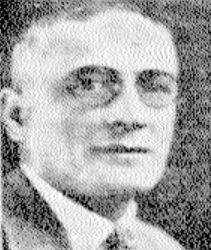
Ernie Asher later in life when in his administrative phase. He scored two of Auckland's tries.

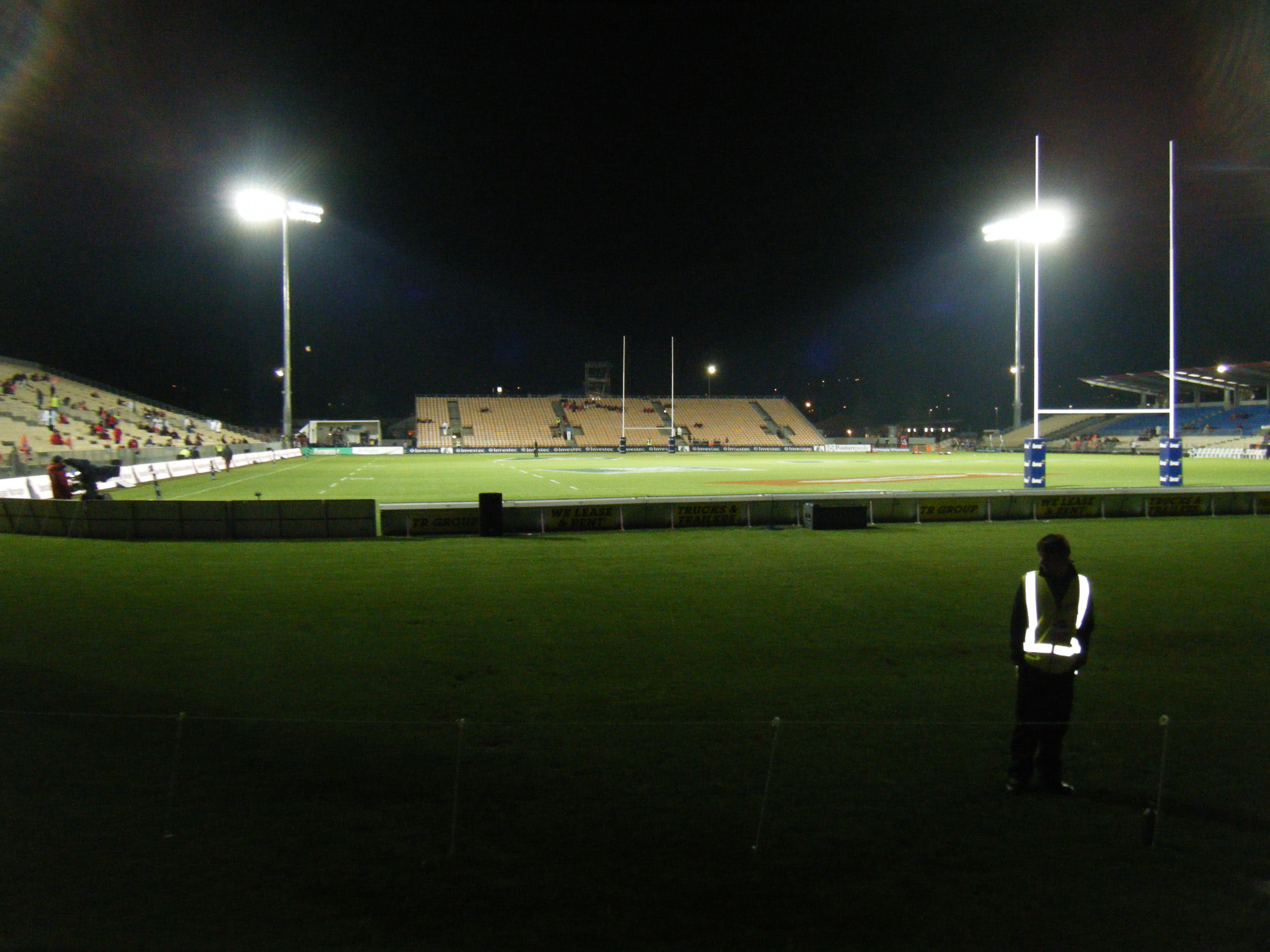
Trafalgar Park, Nelson in modern times.

The Auckland team arrived early on the 5th from Wellington on the Mapourika ship after a rough trip and was received by the committee and players before staying at the Trafalgar Hotel. The Nelson team met at the ground the day before the match for some scrum work and other training. Some of the notable players in the Nelson side were W. Doyle, who weighed over 15 stone and had represented South Canterbury, Ashburton County, and Thames (Auckland). He had been nominated for the All Black team which toured Australia earlier in the year. Bert Feary, Golden Bay's representative in the side, he was a noted hooker and fast in the open, Pat Hannigan who had recently represented New Zealand, captained the side. Bert Guy was also a representative forward who was said to "never tire". In the backs G. Stapp was "one of the best halves that has played for the province". Heavy showers had fallen in the morning and there was another squall shortly before the start of the game which would halve kept more spectators away. Overall the weather was said to be "a sorry specimen of Nelson weather" though there was still a "fair attendance". The game was essentially the second rugby league game played in Nelson after two teams met the previous Saturday at Victory Square. Auckland was captained once again by Charles Dunning who kicked off in the match which was played on spells of 35 minutes each. Bert Guy and Kitching were prominent for the home team but "fine play by the visiting backs kept Nelson defending for a time". Soon after Nelson attacked but Ernie Asher opened the scoring for Auckland and a "dodgy run" with Dunning converting. Great passing by Auckland put them on attack but E. Karsten was prominent for the reds of Nelson and G. Stapp and W. Doyle got over the line and Doyle registered Nelson's first try under rugby league rules. Hannigan missed with the conversion. Soon after Hannigan again went close to scoring and was "loudly applauded, the spectators getting warmly enthusiastic". The Auckland side got going again however and Asher "scored a beautiful try" but this time Dunning missed the extra points. Nelson struggled to defend and Auckland added a third try when Alfred Jackson got over from a scrum but Dunning missed once more. After halftime the Auckland backs "slung the ball about" and Nelson had to defend again but Guy, Bert Feary, and Kitching defended well and C. Dixon took play back to Auckland's territory and Charles James scored and converted himself. Nelson then took the lead when Hannigan, Dixon, and Karsten put in a passing movement which ended in Doyle passing to James who scored and one again he converted his own try and had now scored 10 points in a matter of minutes. Auckland now took a turn on attack with Ashe nearly scoring and then eventually George Seagar scored to retake the lead 14-13 with the conversion missing. Auckland passed well several times but Lionel Nolan's poor handling on the wing nullified things and Guy and Kitching led the way for nelson again but good work by Auckland full back, William Walker saved them from conceding. A Jacobsen, the Nelson winger ruined a chance by hesitating and being pushed out at the corner. Then from the 25 yard line Arthur Carlaw "made a beautiful run and scored" with Dunning converting. Nelson then attacked and James had a shot at goal but missed. Following the game the teams dined at Trafalgar Hotel with Mr. F.W. Fairey, the president of the Nelson league taking the chair, and Mr. B.H. Moller (senior vice-president) the vice-chair. Others to speak were Dunning, Doyle, Carlaw, and Hannigan with songs sung by Carlaw, Doyle, and Edwards. In an interview with Teddy Watts, the Auckland manager he said that "Nelson's challenge for the English Cup was the third one received, Wanganui and Southland are the first two challengers, and Auckland hold it". He also said that he was surprised at the form shown by several of the local players, and "has taken seven names (three from Golden Bay) in view of the visit of the New Zealand team to Australia next season". Charles James who scored 2 tries and kicked 2 conversions was later killed in action in France during World War I in 1917. Auckland left for Hawke's Bay the following morning.

| 5 October | Nelson | 13–24 (3-11) | Auckland | Trafalgar Park, Nelson |
| 3:15 | Try: Charles James 2, W Doyle; Con: Charles James 2/2, Pat Hannigan 0/1; Pen: Charles James 0/1 | | Try: Ernie Asher 2, Alfred Jackson 2, Arthur Carlaw, George Seagar; Con: Charles Dunning 3/6 | Referee: R Kincaid, Touch Judges: W. Millar and G. Hunter |

Team details

| FB | 1 | L. Naylor |
| WG | 2 | E. Karsten |
| CE | 3 | C. Dixon |
| CE | 4 | Charles James |
| WG | 5 | A. Jacobsen |
| FE | 6 | T. Wilson |
| HB | 7 | G. Stapp |
| PR | 8 | W Doyle (15st 11lb) |
| HK | 9 | Bert Feary (13st 10lb) |
| PR | 10 | Pat Hannigan (captain) |
| SR | 11 | Kitching |
| SR | 12 | F. Manssen |
| LF | 13 | Bert Guy |

| FB | 1 | William J. Walker |
| WG | 2 | Ernie Asher |
| CE | 3 | Harry Childs |
| CE | 4 | Arthur Carlaw (9st 10lb) |
| WG | 5 | Lionel Nolan (9st 9lb) |
| FE | 6 | Sid Riley |
| HB | 7 | Alfred Jackson (10st 6lb) |
| PR | 8 | Charles Dunning (captain) (13st 3lb) |
| HK | 9 | Bob Mitchell (12st 8lb) |
| PR | 10 | Harry Fricker (13st 9lb) |
| SR | 11 | Charles Brockliss |
| SR | 12 | Tom Avery |
| LF | 13 | George Seagar (11st) |
Manager: Teddy Watts

=== Tour Match v Hawke's Bay ===
The ad which appeared in the Hastings Standard the day before the match.

The Auckland side stayed at the Clarendon Hotel. The game was played before "a large body of spectators" at the Recreation Ground in Napier with Auckland touring player Arthur Carlaw refereeing his second match of the tour. H. McVay, the Hawke's Bay forward kicked off and play stayed in the Auckland quarter for a short time before Ernie Asher initiated a passing rush which shifted play and the game sped up. George Frater the Hawke's Bay hooker stopped a passing rush by the Auckland backs and sent the ball to S. Pointon, to Roy McEwan who passed infield. Pointon kicked ahead with Auckland missing and H. Smith scored though McVay missed with the conversion. Auckland pressed on to attack and after some "exciting play" Lionel Nolan on the wing for Auckland scored. Auckland kept the pressure up and Sid Kean got over but lost the ball over the dead ball line and the home team could relieve. Hawke's Bay went on the offensive with Smith securing the ball and passing to A. Wall who sent it to McEwan who scored by the posts with the conversion they led 8-6. Auckland rushed to the local team end but Gender Smith spoiled it with a collaring tackled and he kicked down field and then Hawke's Bay scored after Pointon passed to Smith, to Johnson, to Cotterill who scored but it went unconverted. At halftime Hawke's Bay, who were also being named as "Napier" in the local newspaper led 11-6. In the second half Smith and Bill Mackrell, their captain who had played for Auckland and New Zealand, were prominent and five minutes into the half A. Wall sent a pass to McVay who scored. The conversion missed but the home team now led 14-6. Auckland rallied but missed an attempted penalty goal and then Smith moved play back down the field for Hawke's Bay. But then two local men went for the ball at the same time and Sid Kean gathered the loose ball and sprinted over for an Auckland try and Charles Dunning converted. Soon after George Seagar scored from a "scramble on the line" but Dunning missed the conversion this time but the scores were level at 14-14. Lionel Nolan went off with a shoulder injury, later reported as a tendon strain in one of his arms, leaving Auckland with 12 players. Despite the disadvantage Auckland took the lead when Dunning scored after G. Clegg moved slowly at fullback and he converted his own try. McEwan stopped Auckland from scoring and then Tom Cotterill "upended" Asher when he was a yard from the line. Jack Johnson had to go off injured for the local team with a broken wrist and it was now 12 on 12. Auckland moved back on attack once more but the home side rallied and if not for a forward pass by Cotterill "probably would have made the scores equal" and the game ended with Auckland 19-14 in front. The Daily Telegraph (Napier) said that Arthur Carlaw as referee "gave every satisfaction with the whistle".

| 8 Oct | Hawke's Bay | 14–19 (11-6) | Auckland | Napier Recreation Ground |
| 3:00 | Try: H Smith, R McEwan, Tom Cotterill, A Wall; Con: Bill Mackrell 1/1, H. McVay 0/1, G. Frater 0/1, Unknown 0/1 | | Try: Lionel Nolan, Ernie Asher, Sid Kean, George Seagar, Charles Dunning; Con: Charles Dunning 2/5; Pen: Unknown 0/1 | Referee: Arthur Carlaw |

Team details

| FB | 1 | G. Clegg |
| WG | 2 | A. Wall |
| CE | 3 | Roy McEwan |
| CE | 4 | S Pointon |
| WG | 5 | D. Fraser |
| FE | 6 | William Mackrell (captain) |
| HB | 7 | Gender Smith |
| PR | 8 | H. McVay |
| HK | 9 | George Frater |
| PR | 10 | L. Wooll |
| SR | 11 | Tom Cotterill |
| SR | 12 | J. Pointon |
| LF | 13 | Jack Johnson |

| FB | 1 | Harry Childs |
| WG | 2 | Lionel Nolan (9st 9lb) |
| CE | 3 | George Harrison |
| CE | 4 | Sid Riley |
| WG | 5 | Ernie Asher |
| FE | 6 | Alfred Jackson (10st 6lb) |
| HB | 7 | Sid Kean |
| PR | 8 | Charles Dunning (captain) (13st 3lb) |
| HK | 9 | Harry Fricker (13st 9lb) |
| PR | 10 | Bob Mitchell (12st 8lb) |
| SR | 11 | Joe Bennett |
| SR | 12 | Roy Denize |
| LF | 13 | George Seagar (11st) |
Manager: Teddy Watts

=== Tour Match v Dannevirke ===
The final match of the tour was played in Dannevirke on October 12. The match was not officially scheduled but the touring side decided to play an exhibition match to show the local people the game. The local team was weak as they were ignorant to the rules. At halftime the scores were tied at 3-3. Auckland's points had come from Bob Mitchell while Harry Nuttall scored for Dannevirke after some clever play from Charteris and Howe. In the second half Auckland began piling on the score but then Wilson scored for Dannevirke. In the evening Auckland was entertained at Mrs. Morgan's test rooms.

| 12 October | Dannevirke | 8–24 (3-3) | Auckland | Dannevirke Recreation Reserve |
| 3:00 | Try: Harry Nuttal, Wilson; Con: unknown | | Try: Bob Mitchell, Arthur Carlaw, Charles Dunning, Lionel Nolan, Sid Riley, Sydney Cole; Con: Charles Dunning 3 |

Team details

| FB | 1 | McIntosh |
| WG | 2 | Brown |
| CE | 3 | R Drinkwater |
| CE | 4 | Rangi |
| WG | 5 | Puro |
| FE | 6 | Kelly |
| HB | 7 | Wilson | B | PR | 8 | B. Nuttall |
| HK | 9 | Eaton |
| PR | 10 | Howe |
| SR | 11 | Charteris |
| SR | 12 | Parkinson |
| LF | 13 | Harry Nuttall |

| FB | 1 |
| WG | 2 | Lionel Nolan (9st 9lb) |
| CE | 3 | Arthur Carlaw |
| CE | 4 | Sid Riley |
| WG | 5 |
| FE | 6 | Sydney Cole |
| HB | 7 | Sid Kean |
| PR | 8 | Charles Dunning (captain) (13st 3lb) |
| HK | 9 |
| PR | 10 | Bob Mitchell (12st 8lb) |
| SR | 11 |
| SR | 12 |
| LF | 13 |
Manager: Teddy Watts

=== Auckland representative matches played and scorers ===
Matches include the match versus Rotorua, the touring Great Britain side, and the seven tour matches made by the Auckland team. The Dannevirke match did not have a team list reported and therefore only the point scorers are included in the 'played' statistics (Mitchell, Carlaw, Dunning, Nolan, Riley, and Cole) meaning there are seven players with unattributed games played. The goal kicking was particularly poor with many kickers tried and reporters on the tour commenting on how bad it was with just 19 successful conversions from 53 attempts. Towards the end of the tour captain, Charles Dunning began to take most of the kicks and did a slightly better job, finishing the season with 9 conversions from 20 attempts. Loose forward George Seagar led the side for scoring with 9 tries from his 8 games played and he also kicked a conversion and a penalty.

== Auckland representative matches played and scorers ==
| No | Name | Club Team | Play | Tries | Con | Pen | Points |
|---|---|---|---|---|---|---|---|
| 1 | George Seagar | North Shore | 8 | 9 | 1/3 | 1/1 | 31 |
| 2 | Charles Dunning | Ponsonby | 9 | 3 | 9/20 | - | 27 |
| 3 | Sid Kean | City | 4 | 7 | 1/2 | - | 23 |
| 4 | Ernie Asher | City | 7 | 6 | 0/1 | - | 18 |
| 5 | Joe Bennett | Newton | 5 | 4 | 2/7 | - | 16 |
| 6 | Alfred Jackson | North Shore | 8 | 5 | - | - | 15 |
| 7 | Lionel Nolan | Newton | 8 | 4 | 0/1 | - | 12 |
| 8 | Arthur Carlaw | Ponsonby | 6 | 3 | - | - | 9 |
| 9 | Len Farrant | Newton | 2 | 2 | 1/1 | - | 8 |
| 9 | William Bonner | Newton | 2 | - | 3/7 | 1/1 | 8 |
| 11 | Sydney Cole | Ponsonby | 2 | 1 | 2/2 | - | 7 |
| 12 | Sid Riley | Ponsonby | 5 | 2 | - | - | 6 |
| 13 | Harry Fricker | Ponsonby | 7 | 1 | - | - | 3 |
| 13 | Bob Mitchell | City | 6 | 1 | - | - | 3 |
| 13 | Harry Childs | City | 5 | 1 | 0/1 | - | 3 |
| 13 | George Harrison | City | 3 | 1 | - | - | 3 |
| 13 | Albert Asher | City | 2 | 1 | 0/1 | - | 3 |
| 13 | Jim Griffin | North Shore | 2 | 1 | 0/1 | - | 3 |
| 13 | Albert Asher | City | 2 | 1 | - | - | 3 |
| 13 | George Smith | Newton | 2 | 1 | - | - | 3 |
| 21 | Ronald McDonald | Ponsonby | 4 | - | 0/1 | - | 0 |
| 21 | Tom Avery | City | 2 | - | - | - | 0 |
| 21 | Harold (Roy) Denize | City | 2 | - | - | - | 0 |
| 21 | Alex Stanaway | City | 2 | - | - | - | 0 |
| 21 | Charles Brockliss | City | 1 | - | - | - | 0 |
| 21 | Alf Chorley | Ponsonby | 1 | - | - | - | 0 |
| 21 | Fred Jackson | North Shore | 1 | - | 0/3 | - | 0 |
| 21 | Charles Linkhorn | Newton | 1 | - | - | - | 0 |
| 21 | William Mackrell | Newton | 1 | - | - | - | 0 |
| 21 | O Miller | North Shore | 1 | - | - | - | 0 |
| 21 | William J. Walker | *Rotorua | 1 | - | - | - | 0 |
| | Unknown (stats) | - | - | - | 0/1 | 0/1 | 0 |
| TOTAL | All Players | - | 110 | 53 | 19/53 | 2/3 | 201 |
