= 1910 New Zealand rugby league season =

Seasons
- ← 1909 1911 →

The 1910 New Zealand rugby league season was the third season of rugby league that had been played in New Zealand.

== International competitions ==
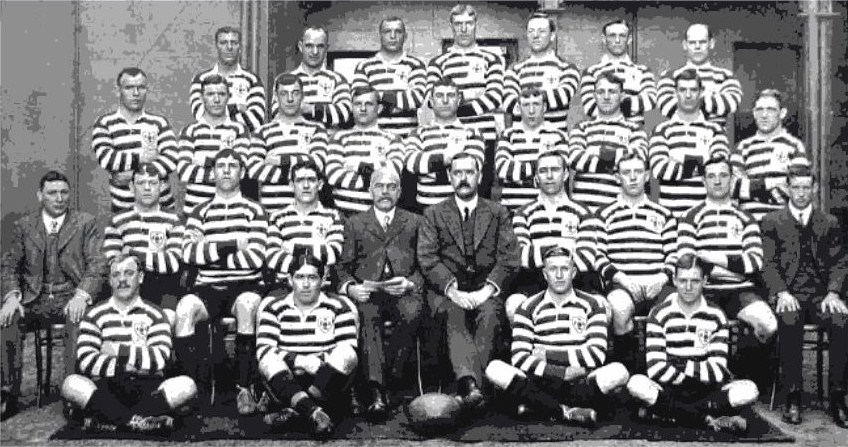
The British touring squad, who wore red and white hooped jerseys.

The New Zealand Rugby League was founded on 25 April 1910 in preparation for the tour by Great Britain later in the year. Taranaki, Auckland and Nelson were represented at the meeting and Southland was admitted later in the year. William Wynyard was one of the first members of the New Zealand Council.

New Zealand hosted the touring Great Britain Lions, losing 20–52. New Zealand wore the colours of Red and Yellow with Black bands for the Test match. It was the only time that they wore these colours. The New Zealand side was: Alf Chorley, Ernie Buckland, Albert Asher, Ernie Asher, Charles James, Frank Woodward, Ronald MacDonald, captain Charles Dunning, Pat Hannigan, Ned Hughes, Fred Jackson, George Seagar and Jim Griffin. Billy Wynyard had served as a selector, a position he was to retain until 1919.

The Great Britain Lions had already defeated New Zealand Māori 29–0 and Auckland 52–9 at Victoria Park, Auckland and Rotorua 54–18 in Rotorua. The Auckland side was; Alf Chorley, L Nolan, G Smith, Albert Asher, Alf Jackson, Ronald MacDonald, Len Farrant, Fred Jackson (c), Charles Dunning, Jim Griffin, Alex Stanaway, H Fricker, George Seagar. Emergencies; Sid Riley, Arthur Carlaw, J Bennett, Jim Rukutai, Bob Mitchell.

During the tour the Lions donated the Northern Union Cup which was awarded to Auckland for inter-provincial competition and is still contested today.

Earlier in the tour the Lions had played two matches against an Australasian team in Sydney. New Zealanders involved in that squad were Riki Papakura, Albert Asher and Con Sullivan.

30 July

New Zealand	20–52	Great Britain
Tries: Buckland, Hughes, MacDonald, Seagar; Goals: Jackson (4)

Domain Cricket Ground, Auckland
Attendance: 16,000
Referee: Jack Stanaway

== Inter-district competition ==
In preparation for the 1911 New Zealand tour of Australia, Auckland toured the country between 20 September and 13 October, playing matches in Wanganui, Bluff, Invercargill, Dunedin, Napier and Dannevirke. The Auckland squad for the tour was; Harry Childs, G Harrison, Ernie Asher, W Banner, Sid Riley, L Nolan, Arthur Carlaw, Alf Jackson, WJ Walker, Ronald MacDonald, Sid Kean, J Bennett, S Cole, T Avery, R Denize, captain Charles Dunning, H Fricker, George Seagar, Bob Mitchell, Harry Oakley and C Brockliss. WJ Walker was selected from the Rotorua sub-league while the rest were Auckland based players.

Auckland were undefeated in their seven match tour defeating Wanganui 15–14, Bluff 42–12, Southland 17–12, Otago-Southland 30–18, Nelson 24–13, Hawke's Bay 19–14 and Dannevirke 24–6. Arthur Carlaw refereed the Bluff match and the Hawke's Bay match.

== Club competitions ==
=== Auckland ===
The 1910 Auckland Rugby League season was the first with an organised club competition. City won it and were awarded the Myers Cup. The Cup had been donated by Arthur Myers.

The competition was meant to start on 7 May but was delayed a week due to the death of King Edward VII. In the opening week Ponsonby United lost to the Newton Rangers 6–12 at Victoria Park while the North Shore and City Rovers drew 0-all at Takapuna Racecourse. The opening weekend team lists were:

- Ponsonby; R McDonald, Harry Oakley, S Riley, A Carlaw, C Dunning, W Tyler, F Lynch, J Cholly, H Bettis, S Cole, H Childs, R W McDonald, A Bettis and J C Harley.
- Newton; Houghton, Haswell, Henderson, Banner, Smith, Armitage, Farrant, Mackrell, Bradburn, Winters, A Smith, F Maki, C Linkhorn, Lupton and Simpson.
- City; C Brett, E Asher, B Blakey, J Lane, A Asher, G Harrison, S Kean, Lowe (2), Haira, Avery, Denize, Blucher, Doran, Dennison, Tobin and Miles.
- North Shore; F Taylor, McDonald, Percival, O Miller, A Sutton, Jackson, Hill, B Wells, Griggin, C Wells, Goulter, Baker and Seager. Emergencies; Harrison, F Shaw and E Bailey.

Jim Rukutai and Alex Stanaway also played for City later in the season. On 25 June Albert Asher was sent off by referee Jack Stanaway. The rest of the City side walked off in support of Asher. Asher became the first player to face the ARL judiciary, who cautioned him.

The Auckland Rugby League management committee for 1910–11 consisted of B Brigham (chair), A J Powley (secretary), Percy S Ussher (treasurer), J G Jackson, M Hooper, E Goulter, George Seagar and J Graham.

The Auckland Provincial Rugby League was constituted at a meeting in the Suffolk Hotel on 6 April 1910.

The Northcote "Ramblers" League Football Club were founded in 1910.
