= Harry Childs =

Harry Childs may refer to:

- Harry Childs (actor), husband of Bessie Toner
- Harry Childs (rugby league), played in 1910 New Zealand rugby league season
- Harry Childs, on List of Bowls England champions

== See also ==
- Henry Childs (disambiguation)
- Harry Child (disambiguation)
