= Henry Childs (disambiguation) =

Henry Childs is a former American football player.

Henry Childs may also refer to:

- Henry H. Childs, politician
- Henry Childs (judge), namesake of Childs, New York
- Henry Childs (architect) on National Register of Historic Places listings in Providence, Rhode Island

== See also ==
- Henri Childs, politician
- Harry Childs (disambiguation)
