= Harry Child =

Harry Child may refer to:

- Harry Child (baseball) (1905–1972), American baseball player
- Harry W. Child (1857–1931), entrepreneur who managed development and ranching companies in southern Montana
- Harry Child, actor in Love Never Dies (musical)

== See also ==
- Harry Childs (disambiguation)
- Henry Langdon Childe (1781–1874), English showman
