= Donald Cameron Hamilton =

Don Hamilton
- Born: Donald Cameron Hamilton; 19 January 1883 Bluff, New Zealand
- Died: 14 April 1925 (aged 42) Auckland, New Zealand
- Weight: 86 kg (190 lb)
- School: Southland Boys' High School

Rugby union career
- Position: Wing-forward
Amateur team(s)
Years	Team	Apps	(Points)
1906–08	Pirates (Invercargill)		
Provincial / State sides
Years	Team	Apps	(Points)
1906–08	Southland	12	(22)
International career
Years	Team	Apps	(Points)
1908	New Zealand	1	(0)
- Rugby league career

Playing information
Representative
Years	Team	Pld	T	G	FG	P
1908–1910	Southland	2	0	0	0	0
- Cricket career

Cricket information

Domestic team information
- Years: Team
- 1919/20: Southland
- Only FC: 17 March 1920 Southland v Otago

Career statistics
Competition	First-class
Matches	1
Runs scored	32
Batting average	16.00
100s/50s	0/0
Top score	24
Catches/stumpings	0/–
- Source: CricInfo, 4 April 2018

Donald Cameron Hamilton (19 January 1883 – 14 April 1925) was a New Zealand rugby football player who represented the New Zealand national rugby union team, the All Blacks in 1908. He also represented his province Southland in rugby union, rugby league, soccer and cricket.

Born in Bluff, then known as Campbelltown, 19 January 1883, Hamilton was educated at Bluff Public School and Southland Boys' High School where he was a member of the 1st XV between 1897 and 1898. He was also an excellent rower and a member of the Awarua Boating Club which won the New Zealand Championship four. A chemist, Hamilton was for many years in charge of the UFS dispensary in Bluff, leaving in 1920 to set up business in Auckland.

== Rugby union career ==
Out of the Pirates club in Invercargill, Hamilton played for the Southland province for three consecutive seasons. It was in his last year, 1908, that he would become an All Black.

After playing in the tour game for Southland against the Anglo-Welsh, Hamilton was in the South Island team that played the North that year. He was then chosen for the national team in the second test match against the touring Anglo-Welsh at Athletic Park in 1908.

Hamilton was one of the principal players, along with fellow All Black Ned Hughes, in the saga of petty officialdom which marred both the Southland and eventually New Zealand unions in 1908–09. In 1908, when he was captain of the Pirates club, he was suspended by the Southland Rugby Union for striking along with the rest of his team and the opposition, Hughes' Britannia club, when they refused to play a match due to ground conditions and the weather with Invercargill being hit by a blizzard. However, whilst suspended the teams played a benefit match under the new Northern Union (rugby league) rules. Then, in 1909, the New Zealand Rugby Union decreed that any player who had played any game under the "Northern" rules was to be regarded as a professional and was to be expelled.

Hamilton never played another game of rugby union.

== Rugby league career ==
Hamilton turned to rugby league and was part of the first ever provincial game of rugby league in the South Island when he played for Southland in a home and away series against Otago in 1908.

Hamilton and the other Bluff resident players of the Pirates club decided in 1910 to form a Northern Union Football (rugby league) club in the port. A series of games against fellow banned players from the Britannia club had been organised.

== Cricket career ==
His other sporting success came in cricket, although he only appeared in one first-class cricket match, for Southland against Otago in 1920. In the 1910-11 season Southland became the first Hawke Cup winners after Hamilton led the team by scoring 110 runs.

He was one of three players nominated by the Southland Cricket Association for the New Zealand team to tour Australia in 1913-14, but he did not earn national honours.

== Personal and death ==
He moved to Auckland, where he worked as a pharmacist. In April 1925, after a period in which he had trouble sleeping, he took an accidental overdose of morphine and died.
