= John Hogan (rugby) =

New Zealand international dual-code rugby player & sportsman

Personal information
- Born: 1 January 1881 Wanganui, New Zealand
- Died: 15 November 1945 (aged 64) Wanganui, New Zealand

Playing information
- Weight: 86 kg (13 st 8 lb)

Rugby union
- Position: Wing Forward
Club
| Years | Team | Pld | T | G | FG | P |
|---|---|---|---|---|---|---|
| | Kaierau |
Representative
| Years | Team | Pld | T | G | FG | P |
| 1903–1908 | Wanganui | 16 |
| 1907 | North Island | 1 | 0 | 0 | 0 | 0 |
| 1907 | New Zealand | 2 | 0 | 0 | 0 | 0 |

Rugby league
- Position: Second-row
Club
| Years | Team | Pld | T | G | FG | P |
|---|---|---|---|---|---|---|
| 1913–14 | Eastern | 3 | 0 | 0 | 0 | 0 |
Representative
| Years | Team | Pld | T | G | FG | P |
| 1913 | New Zealand | 6 | 0 | 0 | 0 | 0 |
| 1910–1913 | Wanganui | 4 | 0 | 0 | 0 | 0 |
| 1913 | Premiers (Wanganui trial) | 1 | 0 | 0 | 0 | 0 |

John "Jack" Hogan (1 January 1881 – 15 November 1945) was a New Zealand rugby football player who represented New Zealand in both rugby union and rugby league as well as being a national champion in water polo.

== Early life ==
Hogan was born in Wanganui in 1881. He received his education at the Wanganui Marist Brothers' School. He was an all-round athlete and rowed for the Aramoho Rowing Club.

== Rugby union career ==
Hogan was a Wing Forward who played rugby union for the Kaierau club before being first selected to represent Wanganui in 1903. He also played water polo and was part of the Wanganui team which won the 1905 national title.

In 1907 Hogan was selected for the All Blacks side that toured Australia. Hogan was hampered by injuries on tour and was restricted to just two games against Queensland.

In 1908 he appeared for Wanganui in a 6–9 loss against the Anglo-Welsh tourists before retiring from rugby union at the end of the year.

== Rugby league career ==
Hogan later began playing rugby league and represented Wanganui. In 1910 he played for Whanganui against Auckland at Cooks Gardens on 22 September. He kicked a conversion in a 15-14 loss.In 1913 Hogan was selected for New Zealand and he again toured Australia. The side played in no test matches while on tour, instead playing matches against New South Wales and Queensland.
