= Billy Tyler =

English footballer

Personal information
- Full name: William Tyler
- Date of birth: 28 May 1900
- Place of birth: Prestwich, England
- Date of death: 1974 (aged 73–74)
- Height: 5 ft 9 in (1.75 m)
- Position: Full-back

Senior career*
Years	Team	Apps	(Gls)
1920–1921	The Beech		
1921–1923	New Cross		
1923–1925	Manchester United	0	(0)
1925–1926	Southport	30	(3)
1926–1927	Bradford City	11	(0)
1927	Bournemouth & Boscombe Athletic	1	(0)
1927–1928	Grimsby Town	1	(0)
1928–1929	Hurst		
1929–1930	Accrington Stanley	7	(0)
1930–193?	Ashton National		
- * Club domestic league appearances and goals

William Tyler (28 May 1900 – 1974) was an English professional footballer who played as a full-back.

== Career ==
Born in Prestwich, Tyler joined Bradford City from Southport in September 1926. He made 11 league appearances for the club, before moving to Bournemouth & Boscombe Athletic on trial in October 1927.

== Sources ==
- Frost, Terry (1988). Bradford City A Complete Record 1903-1988. Breedon Books Sport. ISBN 0-907969-38-0.
