= George Burgess (rugby union) =

NZ international rugby union player

- Born: George Francis Burgess; 20 September 1883 Invercargill, New Zealand
- Died: 2 July 1961 (aged 77) Auckland, New Zealand
- Occupation: Bricklayer

Rugby union career
- Position: Halfback
Amateur team(s)
Years	Team	Apps	(Points)
1902–07	Pirates		
Provincial / State sides
Years	Team	Apps	(Points)
1902–07	Southland	27	
George Burgess
Playing information
Representative
Years	Team	Pld	T	G	FG	P
1908–1910	Southland	2	0	0	0	0

George "Jerry" Francis Burgess (20 September 1883 – 2 May 1961) was a New Zealand rugby union player who represented the All Blacks in 1905. His position of choice was halfback.

He was born in Invercargill in 1883 although he was also said to have been born in October 1876.

He died in Auckland in 1961, and was buried at Waikumete Cemetery.

== Career ==
Burgess was commonly referred to as Jerry.

He originally played as a five-eighth.

Burgess joined the Pirates club in Invercargill and soon made his way into the Southland provincial side. He played 27 games for the union from 1902 until 1907.

On the playing field Burgess was described as a "quick-passing halfback who gave good service to his backs. A reliable player who was adept at making openings".

A referee also stated that Burgess was a "persistent squealer".

His only match for the All Blacks was lucky to be recognised as an international. It was against Australia at Tahuna Park in Dunedin in 1905. He was further helped with selection thanks to the famous Original's tour, meaning the top 27 players in the country had left for the northern hemisphere. Even if it was a slightly weaker side, the match was fortunately won 14–3.

He continued playing rugby for the next two seasons afterwards.

== Family and personal ==
His father was also named George. His mother's name was Elizabeth.

Burgess became a bricklayer.
