= Charles Dunning (rugby) =

New Zealand rugby union and rugby league player

Charlie Dunning
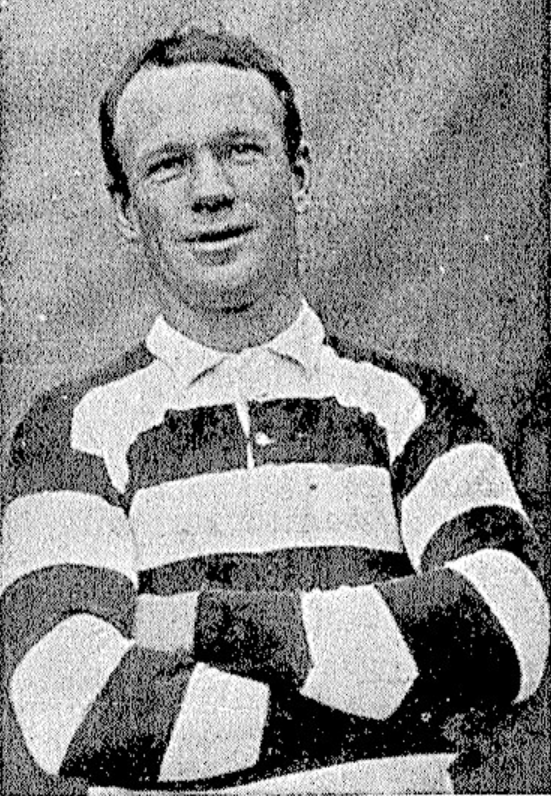

Personal information
- Full name: Charles Dunning
- Born: 17 January 1878 Mahurangi West, New Zealand
- Died: 6 December 1955 (aged 77) Auckland, New Zealand

Playing information
- Height: 180.34 cm (5 ft 11.00 in)
- Weight: 12 st 8 lb (80 kg)

Rugby union
- Position: Prop, Hooker, Back row
Club
Years	Team	Pld	T	G	FG	P
1900–02	Ponsonby	13	0	0	0	0
1903–04	Kaiti-City (Poverty Bay)	4	0	0	0	6
1905–07	Ponsonby	24	2	0	0	6
	Total	41	2	0	0	12
Representative
Years	Team	Pld	T	G	FG	P
1903	Gisborne	2	0	0	0	0
1905–07	Auckland	16	1	0	0	3
1906	North Island	1	0	0	0	0

Rugby league
- Position: Prop, Second-row
Club
Years	Team	Pld	T	G	FG	P
1909	City Rovers	1	0	0	0	0
1909–14	Ponsonby United	29	12	9	0	54
	Total	30	12	9	0	54
Representative
Years	Team	Pld	T	G	FG	P
1907–12	New Zealand	22	3	2	0	13
1908–12	Auckland	26	7	26	0	73

Charles Dunning (17 January 1878 – 6 December 1955) was a New Zealand rugby footballer who was part of the professional 1907–1908 New Zealand rugby tour of Great Britain.

== Early years ==
Dunning was born on 17 January 1878 in Mahurangi, north of Auckland. His mother was Margaret Mackay Dunning and his father was Rufus Dunning. His sister Frankie Regina Dunning was born in 1880, a brother Arthur Rufus was born and died in 1881. A sister, Una Nicholas Irene also died within a year of birth in 1882, while another sister was born in 1883 but died in 1886 at the age of 3. Another sister Eleanor was born in 1883, and sister Eva was born in 1884. Uriel was born in 1884 but died two years later in 1886. Dunning was a builder by trade.

== Rugby football ==
Dunning originally played rugby union for Ponsonby in 1900 before moving to Gisborne and playing there between 1903 and 1904. When he returned to Auckland, Dunning represented the region between 1905 and 1907, becoming a key member of the Ranfurly Shield winning team. Dunning was selected for North Island in 1906.

== Rugby league ==
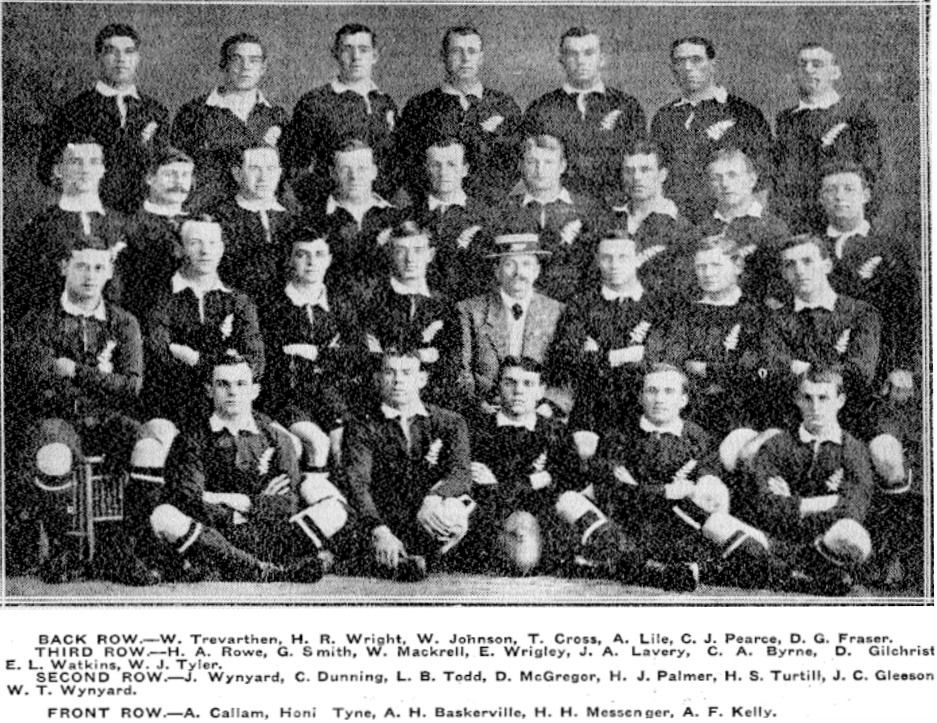
New Zealand Rugby League Team of 1907-08 to Tour England

Dunning was selected for the professional All Blacks 1907–1908 tour of Australia and Great Britain and subsequently received a life ban from the New Zealand Rugby Union. Dunning and Billy Wynyard were the last two players to join the squad, after they had been representing Auckland against Hawke's Bay Rugby Union. He played in one test match while on tour, against Great Britain. On his return to New Zealand Dunning, along with Billy Tyler, helped found the Ponsonby United Rugby League club. In 1909, Dunning played for Auckland but did not tour with the 1909 New Zealand side.

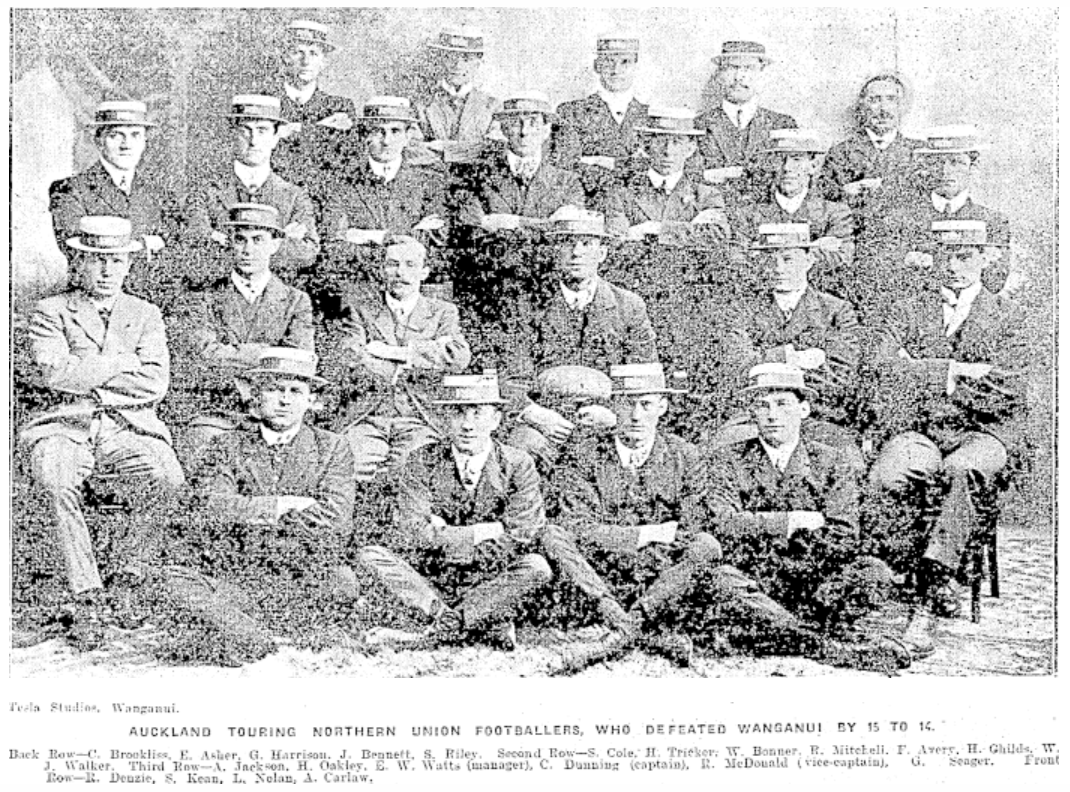

However, in 1910, he captained the side against the touring Great Britain and also captained the Auckland tour of New Zealand at the end of the year. He was part of New Zealand tours of Australia in 1911 and 1912.

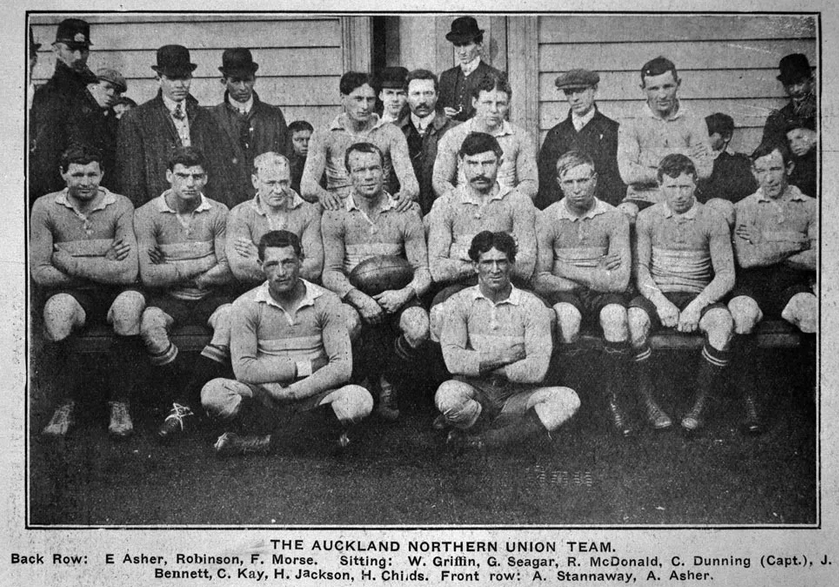
Dunning in the Auckland side to play Wellington on 5 August 1911.

== Later years ==
Dunning suffered a leg injury, losing the patella in his right knee in World War I and walked with a stick until his death in 1955.
