= Arthur Carlaw =

New Zealand international rugby league footballer

Personal information
- Full name: Arthur Edward Carlaw
- Born: 28 July 1884 Auckland, New Zealand
- Died: 8 November 1934 (aged 50) Christchurch, New Zealand

Playing information
- Weight: 73 kg (11 st 7 lb)
- Position: Wing, Stand-off
Club
Years	Team	Pld	T	G	FG	P
1908–13	Ponsonby United	24	13	3	0	45
Representative
Years	Team	Pld	T	G	FG	P
1909–13	Auckland	19	9	0	0	27
1909–13	New Zealand	17	2	0	0	6
- Relatives: James Carlaw (uncle)

Arthur Carlaw was a New Zealand rugby league player who played a role in the establishment of the sport in New Zealand and represented New Zealand.

His uncle, James, was an administrator in the sport and Carlaw Park was named after him and his brother William served with the New Zealand Rugby Leaque Football Council.

== Playing career ==
Carlaw about to take a pass from Alfred Jackson in Auckland's 17-13 win over Hawke's Bay on August 19, 1911 at Victoria Park.

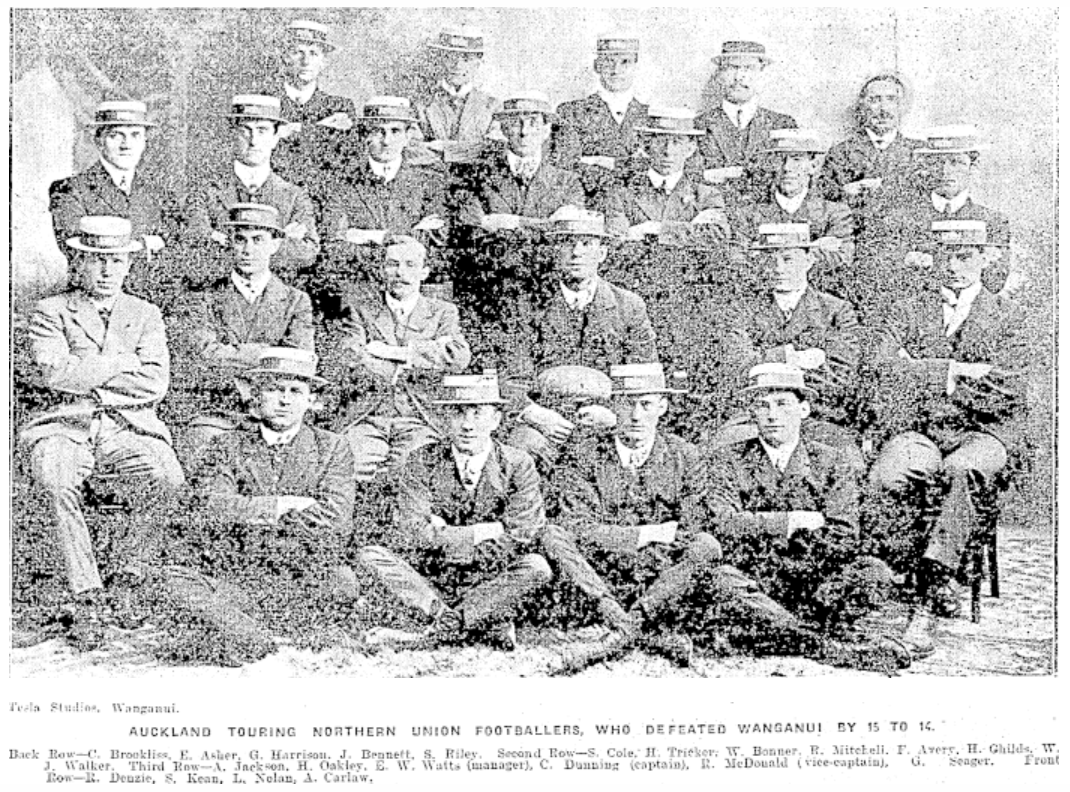

Carlaw was involved in the formation of the Ponsonby United club in August 1908, the first rugby league club to be formed in Auckland.

The Auckland Rugby League was formed on 19 July 1909 and Carlaw was part of the organisation's first sanctioned match, captaining a City combination against the North Shore. During the season he also played for Ponsonby and at the club's first AGM, on 30 July 1909, he was elected to the club's executive. He also represented the district that year, playing against Taranaki and Wellington.

Carlaw was also part of the 1909 tour of Australia by New Zealand however the series was lost 1–2. He again played for New Zealand in 1910, losing 52–20 to the touring Great Britain Lions at the Domain Cricket Ground.

Carlaw had again played for Ponsonby during the 1910 season and was selected for Auckland, being part of the side that lost to Great Britain 52-9 and also touring Wanganui, Bluff, Invercargill, Dunedin, Napier and Dannevirke. He served as referee in the Bluff match.

Carlaw was selected by New Zealand to tour Australia in 1912. During the tour the captain, Arthur Francis, left to take up a professional contract with Wigan and Carlaw was appointed his replacement. Carlaw again represented New Zealand in Australia in 1913, his final season.

== World War I, Later Years and Death ==
At the conclusion of the 1913 season Carlaw moved to a farm too far out of Auckland for him to continue to play. On 14 December 1914, he embarked on a ship to join the World War I effort. After the war he moved to Christchurch in 1926 where he refereed and coached while working as a Stonemason. He had been gassed while serving in the war in France and was said to have struggled with his health ever since. He died at the age of 51 at Christchurch Hospital. He was buried at Bromley Cemetery with his coffin draped in the house flag of the Returned Soldiers' Association. His funeral was attended by Mr. W. Coles who represented the New Zealand Council, Mr W. E. Healey representing the Auckland League, Mr W. S. E. Moyle, the local executive chairman, Mr A. Clark of the referees association, and Mr C. Richardson of the Riccarton club .
