= Ned Hughes =

NZ dual-code rugby international player

Personal information
- Full name: Edward Hughes
- Born: 26 April 1881 Invercargill, New Zealand
- Died: 1 May 1928 (aged 47) New South Wales, Australia

Playing information
- Height: 170 cm (5 ft 7 in)
- Weight: 76 kg (12 st 0 lb)

Rugby union
Club
Years	Team	Pld	T	G	FG	P
1919	Poneke
Representative
Years	Team	Pld	T	G	FG	P
1903–1908	Southland	23
1904	Otago/Southland
1907–21	New Zealand	9 (6)	1 (1)	0	0	3 (3)
1907	South Island
1920	Wellington
1921	North Island

Rugby league
Club
Years	Team	Pld	T	G	FG	P
1908–10	Britannia	7	3	2	0	13
1908	Exhibition teams	2	1	1	0	5
	Total	9	4	3	0	18
Representative
Years	Team	Pld	T	G	FG	P
1908–10	Southland	2	0	0	0	0
1910	New Zealand	1	1	0	0	3
1910	Southland/Otago	1	0	1	0	2

Edward Hughes (26 April 1881 – 1 May 1928), was a New Zealand rugby union and rugby league footballer who played 9 times (6 of these were test matches) as an All Black hooker from 1907 until 1921 and twice for the Kiwis in 1910. His All Black career is unique in that there was a gap of 13 years between test matches, and that he is the oldest player ever to have played for the All Blacks, at age 40 years, 123 days.

== Rugby union ==
Hughes first made the All Blacks in 1907.

He was one of the principal players, along with fellow All Black Don Hamilton, in the saga of petty officialdom which marred both the Southland and eventually New Zealand unions in 1908–09. In 1908, when he was captain of the Britannia club, he was suspended by the Southland Rugby Union for striking along with the rest of his team and the opposition, Hamilton's Pirates, when they refused to play a match due to ground conditions and the weather with Invercargill being hit by a blizzard. However, whilst suspended the teams played a benefit match under the new Northern Union (rugby league) rules. Then, in 1909, the New Zealand Rugby Union decreed that any player who had played any game under the "Northern" rules was to be regarded as a professional and was to be expelled.

== Rugby league ==
Hughes first game of rugby league was for Britannia after they had switched codes en masse along with the Bluff based players of the Pirates club. The match was played on 15 July 1908. They played again on the 19th and a 3rd match was played on the 22nd with Hughes scoring a try in a 21–17 loss. Hughes then played in two exhibition matches for the "Colours" team who in fact wore red against a side wearing black. He kicked a conversion in the first match won by his side 20–3, and scored a try and kicked a conversion in the second match which his team again won 31–24.

Hughes was then part of the first ever provincial game of rugby league in the South Island when he played for Southland in a home and away series against Otago in 1908. He was only involved in the first match which Southland lost 11–8 at the Caledonian Ground in Dunedin. He badly injured his hand in the match and was not able to play in the return match.

Hughes applied for reinstatement to rugby early in 1909 but was told that the Southland Rugby Union did not have the power to reinstate him. He continued to try for reinstatement off and on for 2 more seasons. During 1909 he played neither rugby league nor rugby union but did play some club soccer.

In 1910 he played 2 matches for Britannia against the Bluff rugby league club, scoring 2 tries and kicking a conversion. Hughes then earned national selection and on 30 July 1910 he played for New Zealand in a Test against a touring Great Britain side. He scored the final try for New Zealand in a 52–20 loss. It was reported that in the hooker position he was "securing the ball n nearly every scrum... Hughes played brilliantly from end to end of the match and justified his reputation in every way".

He played 2 more matches for Britannia against the Bluff side before being selected to play for Southland against the touring Auckland side. Auckland won the match 17–12 at Queens Park, Invercargill with 2,000 spectators in attendance. Hughes was then chosen in a combined Southland/Otago side to play Auckland 3 days later. The match was played at the Caledonian Ground in Dunedin and Auckland won 3018 with Hughes kicking a conversion in the losing side.

The 1911 season saw Hughes named as the deputy captain of the Brittania club and on the general committee however he decided to concentrate on boxing. He was already a well known wrestler in the area and was joining his brother J.J Hughes in the sport who became a New Zealand amateur boxing champion. He was selected for the New Zealand tour of Australia but decided not to travel because of his boxing commitments.

Tragedy struck his family on 26 October when his brother Patrick drowned in the Oreti River. He had played rugby for Britannia prior to their switching codes, and he later played rugby for the Athletic club. He and his two brothers (Ned and Michael) were crossing the river at Otatara to the flaxmill. The flat bottomed boat they were in was tipped over in heavy winds and rough water. Ned attempted to save him after diving into the water but he lost consciousness and "woke up in bed". It was described later that he had washed up onshore and needed to be resuscitated. The other brother (Michael) had dived in also but was not able to locate him. Patricks body was not recovered until around 4pm on 29 October. He was aged just 27 and left behind a wife and 2 children.

== Return to union ==
After World War I, he was allowed to play rugby union again, and was recalled to the All Black side to play in the two Tests against South Africa in 1921.

He died in New South Wales, Australia, in a building accident at the age of 47.
