= Charles James (rugby league) =

New Zealand international rugby league footballer

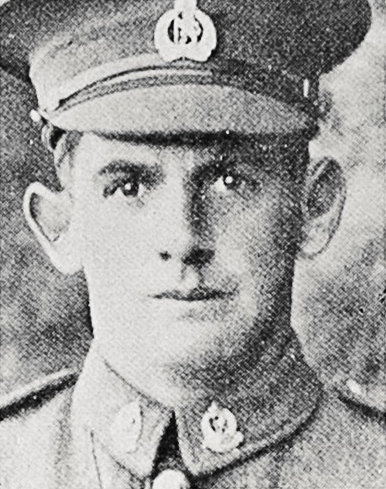
- James during World War I

Personal information
- Full name: Charles Daniel James
- Born: 10 April 1891
- Died: 6 August 1917 (aged 26) France

Playing information
- Position: Wing, Centre
Club
Years	Team	Pld	T	G	FG	P
1909	Hornets	2
1910–12	Kaitoa/Albion	19	3			9
	Total	21	3	0	0	9
Representative
Years	Team	Pld	T	G	FG	P
1910–12	Nelson Trial Team	3
1910	New Zealand	1	0	0	0	0
1910–12	Nelson	6	2	2	0	10

Charles Daniel James (10 April 1891 – 6 August 1917) was a New Zealand rugby league footballer who played in the 1910s. He played at representative level for New Zealand, and Nelson, as a wing or centre.

== Playing career ==
=== Kaitoa/Albion club, and Nelson representative side ===
In 1909 James played 2 matches for the Hornets rugby league team. Then in 1910 he joined the Kaitoa club and played 10 matches, all against the St Mary's Catholic Club. He scored 2 tries in a 28 May game against Alhambra and another in a 23 July match against the same opponents. It is likely he scored a good deal more than this during his seasons with them though the local newspapers rarely wrote detailed match reports. His form was good enough to gain him selection for the NZ team. Later in the season he played in 2 trial matches for the Nelson side which he was subsequently selected for. Nelson then played a match against the touring Auckland side. He scored 2 tries and kicked 2 conversions in their 24-13 loss at Trafalgar Park.

In 1911 the Kaitoa club changed their name to Albion. He played 8 matches for them during the season again against St Mary's. He played in a Nelson trial match to gain selection for their Northern tour. He played in all 3 matches against Auckland at Victoria Park, Taranaki at Eltham, and Wanganui at Cooks Gardens.

1912 appears to be the last season that James played rugby league. He played a match for Nelson against the touring Wanganui side on 7 April followed by another match for Nelson against Wellington on 8 June. Then he appeared in a club match for Albion against St Mary's with there being no further mention of him playing in any of the local Nelson newspapers. With the outbreak of war rugby league was no longer played in the Nelson area for many years.

=== International honours ===
James won a cap for New Zealand during the 1910 Great Britain Lions tour of Australia and New Zealand, playing left-Wing in the 20-52 defeat by Great Britain at the Domain Cricket Ground, Auckland on Saturday 30 July 1910. He was said to have played well and his pass set up New Zealand's first try. He was said by one of the non playing English players to have been the best New Zealand back alongside Ernie Buckland of Taranaki.

== Later years ==
James served with the 1st Battalion, New Zealand Rifle Brigade during World War I and was killed in France on 6 August 1917.
