= Sid Riley =

Australian rugby union player

- Born: Sidney Austin Riley; 18 April 1878 Auckland, NZ
- Died: 31 March 1964 (aged 85) Auckland

Rugby union career
- Position: centre
International career
Years	Team	Apps	(Points)
1903	Australia	1	(0)

Sid Riley
Personal information
- Full name: Sidney Austin Riley

Playing information
- Position: Halfback
Club
Years	Team	Pld	T	G	FG	P
1910–1912	Ponsonby United	20	6	3	0	24
Representative
Years	Team	Pld	T	G	FG	P
1908–12	Auckland	8	1	0	0	3
1912	New Zealand	1	0	0	0	0

Sidney Austin Riley (18 April 1878 – 31 March 1964) was a rugby union player who represented Australia.

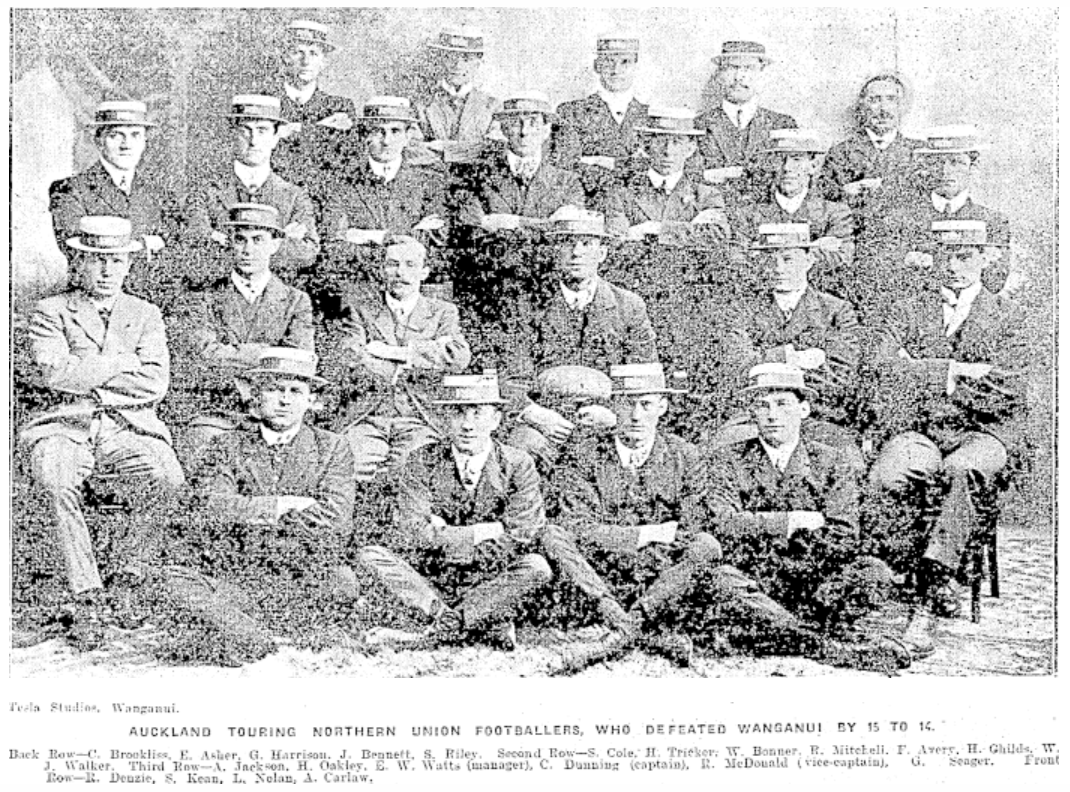

Riley, a centre, was born in Auckland, New Zealand, and claimed one international rugby cap for Australia, against New Zealand, at Sydney, on 15 August 1903. He also played rugby league in a match for New Zealand against Auckland and played for Auckland several times and was a member of the Ponsonby rugby club and Ponsonby United rugby league club.
