= Ronald MacDonald (rugby) =

NZ international rugby league footballer

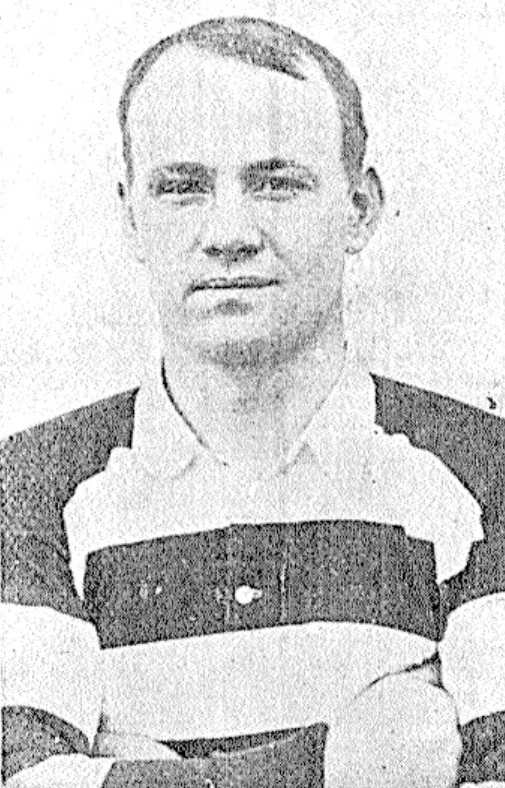

Personal information
- Full name: Ronald Amelioran MacDonald
- Born: New Zealand

Playing information

Rugby union
Club
Years	Team	Pld	T	G	FG	P
1904–07	Ponsonby RFC	33	2	0	0	6
Representative
Years	Team	Pld	T	G	FG	P
1907	Auckland	6	0	0	0	0

Rugby league
- Position: Wing, Five-eighth, Halfback
Club
Years	Team	Pld	T	G	FG	P
1909	North Shore Albions	2	0	0	0	0
1910–11	Ponsonby United	10	4	0	0	12
	Total	12	4	0	0	12
Representative
Years	Team	Pld	T	G	FG	P
1908–10	Auckland	10	1	0	0	3
1909–11	New Zealand	4	2	0	0	6

Ronald MacDonald was a New Zealand rugby league footballer who represented New Zealand between 1909 and 1911.

== Rugby union career ==
MacDonald originally played rugby union and represented Auckland as a wing-forward.

== Rugby league career ==
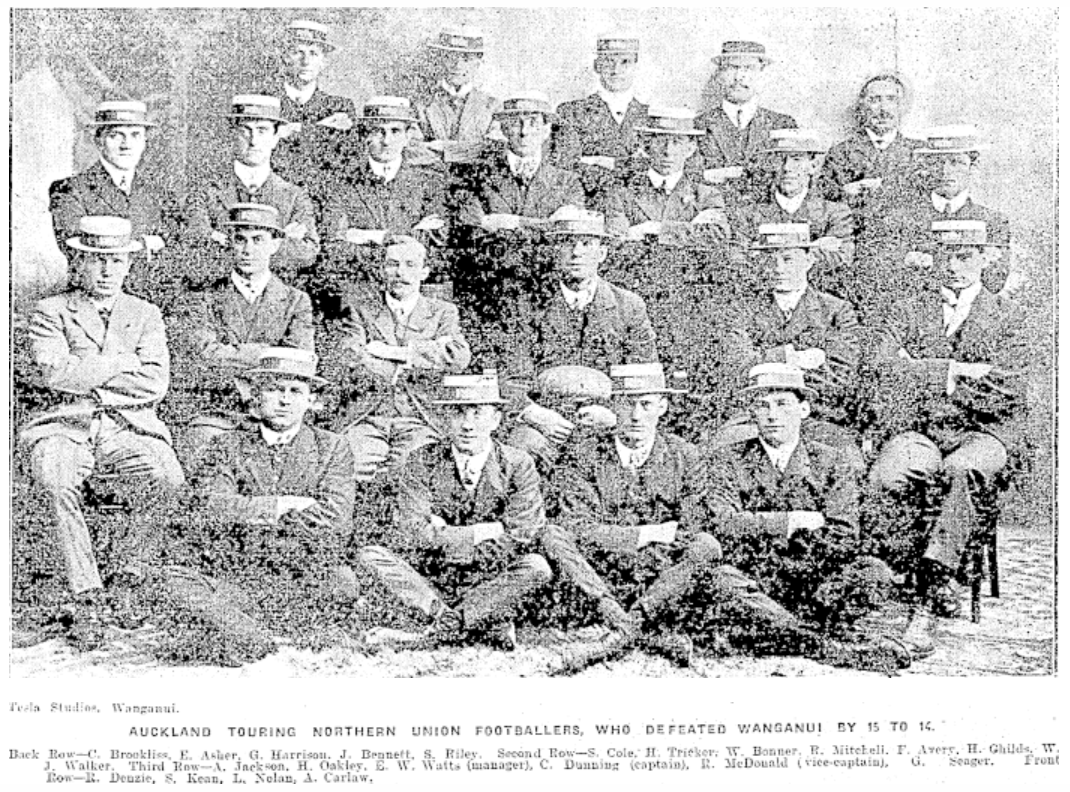

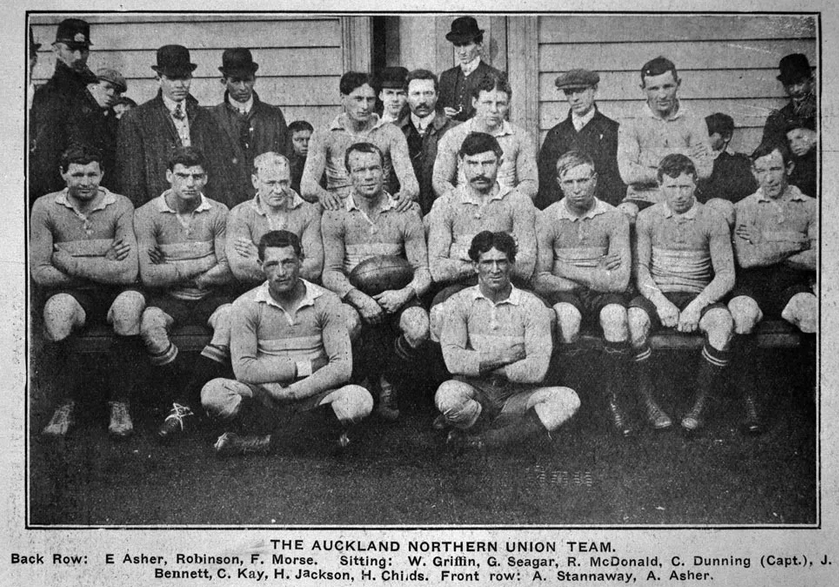
MacDonald in the Auckland side to play Wellington on August 5, 1911

MacDonald, a halfback from Auckland, was part of Auckland's original 1908 rugby league team. He first represented New Zealand during the 1909 tour of Australia, playing in all three Test matches. MacDonald scored a try in the first Test match.

MacDonald was again selected for New Zealand for the first Test match in New Zealand, against the 1910 Great Britain Lions. MacDonald scored a try in the match. He was part of the Auckland tour of New Zealand at the end of the year.

MacDonald was part of the 1911 New Zealand side that toured Australia, playing against New South Wales and Queensland. He was Auckland's sole Auckland selector in 1911 and later served as a national selector and as Auckland's delegate to the New Zealand Rugby League.
