= Bob Mitchell (rugby league) =

New Zealand international rugby league footballer

Personal information
- Full name: Robert Mitchell
- Born: 1886 New Zealand
- Died: Deceased

Playing information
- Position: Stand-off, Second-row
Club
Years	Team	Pld	T	G	FG	P
1910–13	City Rovers	25	7	0	0	21
1914–19	Grafton Athletic	28	2	0	0	6
1919	Marist Old Boys	2	0	0	0	0
	Total	55	9	0	0	27
Representative
Years	Team	Pld	T	G	FG	P
1910–14	Auckland	29	14	0	0	42
1912–14	New Zealand	8	3	0	0	9
1919	NZ Touring Team (Auckland)	1	1	0	0	3
1919	Auckland Province	1	0	0	0	0

Robert "Bob" Mitchell is a New Zealand rugby league footballer who represented New Zealand.

== Playing career ==
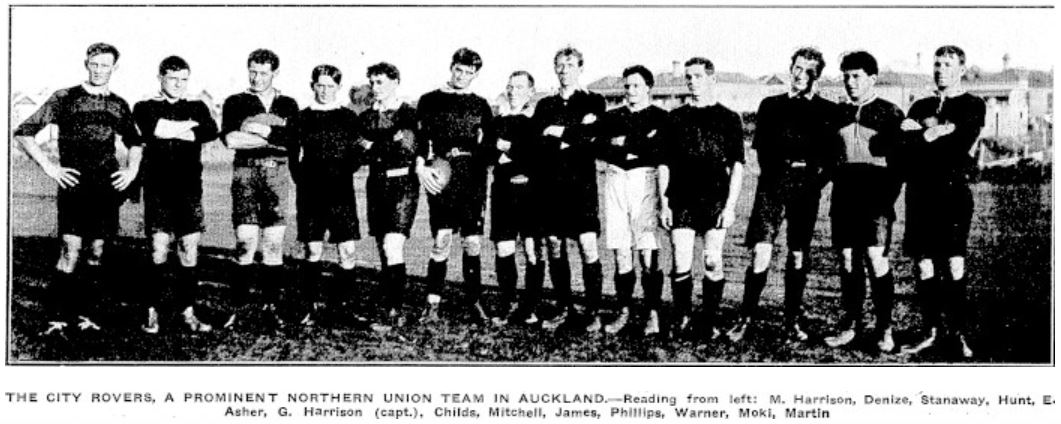
Mitchell 6th from the right in the City Rovers team of May 11, 1912.

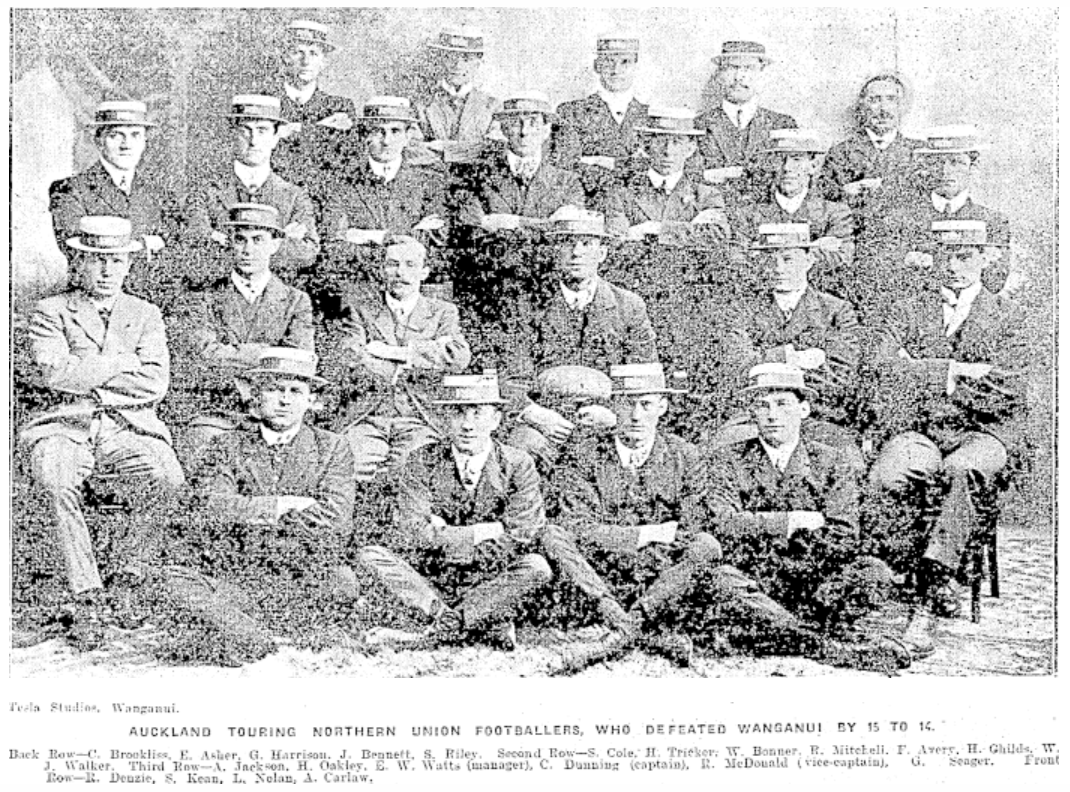

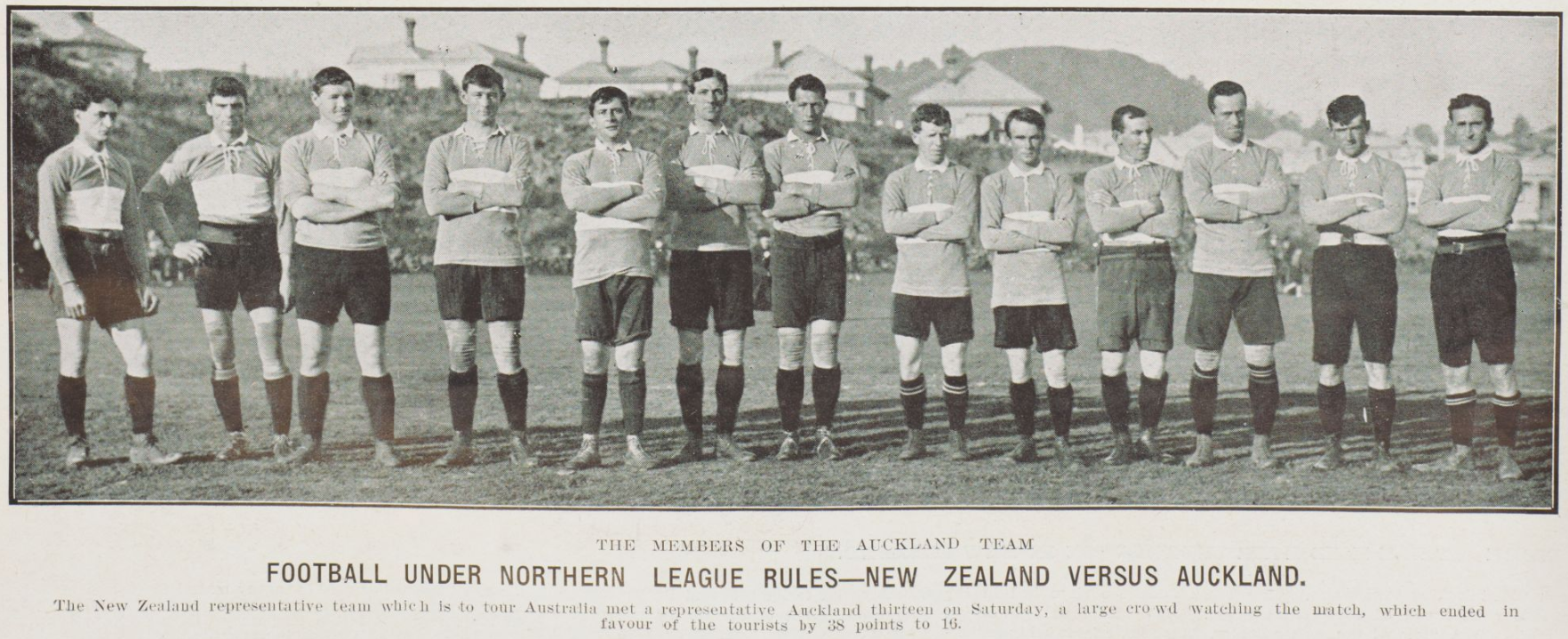
Mitchell in the 1912 Auckland team to play New Zealand at Eden Park.

Mitchell played for the City Rovers in the Auckland Rugby League competition. He represented Auckland in 1910 against the touring Great Britain Lions. He was also part of the Auckland side that toured the country between 20 September and 13 October, playing matches in Wanganui, Bluff, Invercargill, Dunedin, Napier and Dannevirke.

In 1912 he played for Auckland against New Zealand as part of New Zealand's preparation for their tour of Australia. Later in the year, he played for Auckland, and New Zealand against the subsequent touring New South Wales side. New Zealand were defeated 10-18.

New Zealand toured Australia in 1913, and Mitchell played in two matches for New Zealand against New South Wales. No test matches were played on that tour but Mitchell became Kiwi #87.

By 1914, Mitchell had joined the Grafton club. He played for Auckland against the touring Great Britain Lions.

After the war, Mitchell represented Auckland Province against the 1919 touring Australian side. Grafton were struggling to field a side at this point and he sought a transfer to the Marist Old Boys which was granted.
