= Sid Kean =

New Zealand international rugby league footballer

Personal information
- Full name: Sydney Kean
- Born: 1888 New Zealand
- Died: Deceased

Playing information
- Position: Scrum-half
Club
Years	Team	Pld	T	G	FG	P
1910–11	City Rovers	10	2	2	0	10
Representative
Years	Team	Pld	T	G	FG	P
1910	Auckland	4	8	1	0	26
1911	New Zealand	1	0	0	0	0

Sid Kean was a New Zealand rugby league player who represented New Zealand.

== Playing career ==
Kean played for the City Rovers in the Auckland Rugby League competition. In 1910 he was part of the Auckland side that toured the country, playing matches in Wanganui, Bluff, Invercargill, Dunedin, Napier and Dannevirke. He also refereed the first game on the tour when Auckland beat Whanganui 15-14 at Cooks Gardens.

In 1911 he was selected to play for New Zealand on their tour of Australia. No test matches were played on tour as New Zealand played matches against New South Wales and Queensland.
