= 1909 New Zealand rugby league season =

Seasons
- 1908 1910

The 1909 New Zealand rugby league season was the second season of rugby league that had been played in New Zealand.

== International competitions ==
New Zealand toured Australia, losing the series 1–2. The team was managed by Daniel Fraser while James Barber captained the side. The squad included William Trevarthen, Adam Lile, Conrad Byrne, Harold Rowe, George and John Spencer, Con Sullivan and Charlie Pearce, Ernie Buckland, Arthur Carlaw, Paddy George, Gordon Hooker, Thomas Houghton, Albert House, Bert King, Henry Knight and Ronald MacDonald. Albert Asher was invited to tour with the side but declined, opting to remain in Auckland and organise the upcoming Māori tour of Australia. These were the last tests between New Zealand and Australia on Australian soil until 1948.

A New Zealand Māori side also toured Australia, the second Māori team to do so. The team was captained by Riki Papakura and included Albert and Ernie Asher, Jim Rukutai and Frank Barclay. Before the side left New Zealand they lost 14–21 to Auckland on 10 July 1909 at Victoria Park in front of 2–3,000 spectators.

Peter Moko played for Glebe in the NSWRFL Premiership.

== Inter-district competitions ==
Auckland played two matches against Taranaki. Taranaki won the first match at Victoria Park 8–7 on 7 August in front of 5,00 fans before losing 11–27 at the New Plymouth Sports Ground on 16 September. Lance Todd served as the referee for both matches. Adam Lile was the Taranaki player-coach and the side included Arthur Hardgrave and Lance Moir.

The Auckland team for the first match was; T Houghton, A Chorley, F Woodward, A Carlaw, captain D Wynyard, R MacDonald, A Jackson, F Wells, B Mackrell, C Dunning, J Griffen, Linkhorn and Seagar. Bill Tyler, Alex Stanaway, Albert Asher and Dick Papakura all appeared for Auckland later in the season.

Wellington defeated Auckland, in Auckland, 22–19 on 9 October. This was the first of only five victories for Wellington over Auckland in over 100 years. Wellington included Conrad Byrne, Tom Cross, Con Sullivan, George and John Spencer and Hercules Richard Wright.

Rotorua, who included Dick Papakura, defeated an Auckland XIII 33–8 in Rotorua. Auckland included Bill Tyler but the Auckland selectors underestimated the quality of the Rotorua side and picked an understrength side. Auckland fullback Archie Ferguson broke his leg in the match and retired, becoming a referee. Ferguson controlled the 1910 Auckland match against Great Britain and toured Australia twice, as a referee in 1919 and as a co-manager of New Zealand in 1930.

== Club competitions ==
The Auckland Rugby League was formed on 19 July 1909 at the Auckland Chamber of Commerce boardroom with 150 people present. MP Albert Glover chaired the meeting and was elected a vice-president. The Mayor of Auckland, Charles Grey was elected president while Billy Wynyard was elected treasurer. Within days three clubs had been formed; City Rovers, Devonport United (later North Shore) and Newton Rangers. Ponsonby United had been formed in 1908. Duncan McLean was the first chairman of both Devonport United and the Auckland Rugby League.

There was also a three club sub-league in Rotorua that affiliated itself to the ARL.

The first ARL sanctioned match was held on 24 July 1909 at Eagleton's Ground in Epsom. The North Shore club defeated a City combination 44–24. The City combination consisted of players involved in forming all three of the clubs on that side of the harbour and included Bill Tyler, captain Arthur Carlaw, Thomas Houghton, Alf Chorley and Charles Dunning. The North Shore were captained by Dick Wynyard and included Frank Woodward.

Ponsonby United held its first AGM on 30 July 1909. James Carlaw was elected the first Chairman while Charles Dunning, Jack Stanaway and Arthur Carlaw were elected to the executive.

Ponsonby United defeated the Newton Rangers 16–6 on 21 August at Victoria Park. They also played the North Shore and City during the year. Bill Tyler, Charles Dunning and Arthur Carlaw were among the 32 players that played for Ponsonby that year.

The City Rovers included Ernie and Albert Asher, Jim Rukutai and Alex Stanaway.
