= 1908 New Zealand rugby league season =

Seasons
- 1909 →

The 1908 New Zealand rugby league season was the first season that rugby league had been played in New Zealand. Auckland played Wellington in a two match series that was won by Auckland 1-0. Otago and Southland also participated in a two match series which was drawn 1-all. Auckland and Taranaki then drew a two match series.

The impetuous for the season was the return of the 1907-1908 New Zealand professional rugby team that had toured Australia and Great Britain. On their return many players wanted to start the game in New Zealand and helped found clubs. During 1908 a New Zealand Māori rugby league team was also touring Australia. The Māori tour included Alex Stanaway, Peter Moko, Glen Pakere, Albert and Ernie Asher, Riki Papakura and Frank Barclay.

== First game ==
The first game of rugby league ever played in New Zealand occurred on 13 June 1908 and was played between members of the 1907-1908 touring party. The game was a memorial game for the deceased Albert Baskerville and was held at Athletic Park in Wellington. New South Wales were originally scheduled to participate but they instead remained in Sydney to play the touring Māori team. Instead the touring party divided themselves into two groups and played each other. 8,000 people attended to see the "Wright's Blacks" defeat the "Turtill's Reds" 55-20. The match allowed the team to raise £300 for Mrs Baskiville, Albert's mother. It was also the last match of rugby league played at Athletic Park until 1990.

== Club game ==
The Britannia and Pirates rugby union clubs, from Invercargill, played the first club game of rugby league in New Zealand on 22 July at Domain Ground, Bluff, using rule books bought back to New Zealand by the touring party and sent down to Invercargill. All Black Ned Hughes was the captain of the Britannia club, which also included future New Zealand international Walter Milne. The match was played after both sides had been suspended by the Southland Rugby Union for "striking" after they had refused to go back onto the field after halftime due to the blizzard conditions.

== Auckland v Wellington ==
As the majority of the returned players were from Auckland and Wellington these two regions had an advantage in setting up teams. It is therefore of no surprise that the first provincial games of rugby league were played between Auckland and Wellington.

=== Game one ===
The first game was played at Victoria Park, Auckland on 24 August in front of a crowd of 8,000. Victoria Park was the home of the new Ponsonby United Rugby League Club which had been founded by Bill Tyler and Charles Dunning. Daniel Fraser was the organising secretary and thirteen of the tourists took part in the game including Dick Wynyard, who captained Auckland. Wellington scored four tries to Auckland's two but Auckland won 16-14 due to the goal kicking of Bill Tyler.

- Auckland: S Riley, P Redwood, H Rowe, C Dillamore, W Tyler, W Wynyard, R Wynyard, W Mackrell, W Trevarthen, C Dunning, R MacDonald, F Gladding, M Hooper.
- Wellington: G Spencer, King, O Instone, D Twohill, J Barber, A House, A Kelly, P McGill, C Pearce, C Byrne, J Spencer, D Gilchrist and A Lile.

Edward Tyne and Adam Lile both worked for the New Zealand Railways Department and were threatened with losing their jobs if they played in the match. Tyne, who had a family, withdrew while Lile played and was subsequently fired.

=== Game two ===
A return match was played at Petone Recreation Ground, Petone on 12 September and was drawn 13-all in front of 4,000 spectators. The Wellington side were bolstered by All Golds Hercules Wright, Tom Cross and Edward Tyne who had missed the first match. Future internationals Bert King and Henry Knight also made their debuts for Wellington in this match. Auckland had lost Bill Wynyard but gained Albert Asher and Frank Barclay.

== Otago v Southland ==
After the first club game in the South Island the Northern Union Amateur Rugby League (Otago Centre) was formed. The organisation then arranged a home and away series between Otago and Southland. All members of the two teams were given life bans by the New Zealand Rugby Union.

=== Game one ===
The first game was played at Caledonian Ground in Dunedin on 3 October and used goalposts which were rented from the Otago Rugby Union. The Southland side included Ned Hughes, George Burgess and Don Hamilton, all former All Blacks. Otago won the match 11-8.

The Otago side was made up of fullback D Bannantyne, three-quarters J Harrhy, WR Kirk and G Ogg, five-eighths EO Nees and P Walker, halfback J Coulter, and forwards J Bryant, E Manley (captain), T Mockford, W Harridge, J Campbell and Larkins.

=== Game two ===
A return match was played at Queens Park, Invercargill on 7 October. Southland was able to win the match 30-14 and draw the series.

== Taranaki v Auckland ==
Meanwhile, Adam Lile had been organising the game in Taranaki and a Taranaki team took on Auckland in a two match series with Lile acting as Taranaki's player-coach.

=== Game one ===
The first game was held in New Plymouth five days after the second Auckland v Wellington match. On the 17 September Aucklanmd lost to Taranaki 5-3 at Western Park in front of a crowd of 600. Auckland included Alf Chorley, who had previously played for Halifax and Swinton, and Thomas Houghton. Taranaki included Arthur Hardgrave, Ernie Buckland and Gordon Hooker.

=== Game two ===
Auckland however won the second game 21-18. This match was held in Auckland.

== Ponsonby ==
The Ponsonby United Rugby League Club was formed in August 1908 by a group that included Billy Tyler and Charlie Dunning. Ponsonby played a series of matches against loosely organised teams during 1908.
