= 1908 Auckland Rugby League season =

Rugby season for the unofficial Auckland Rugby League

The 1908 season for Auckland consisted of four representative matches played in an effort to grow the game in Auckland and New Zealand. The team was chosen prior to the formation of the Auckland Rugby League so were an ‘unofficial’ Auckland team though they were very strong nonetheless and many of the players went on to represent Auckland and New Zealand in the ensuing years. Several of the players were also strongly involved in the establishment of club sides and the growth of the game in Auckland for many years to come such as Albert Asher, Charles Dunning, William Wynyard, and Ronald MacDonald.

Origins of Auckland Rugby League; 1908	Succeeded by 1909

== The games ==
The four matches were against Wellington and Taranaki with games being played in Auckland, Wellington and New Plymouth. They resulted in 3 wins and a draw. Prior to the last match of the season against Taranaki at Victoria Park the promoters of the proposed Auckland League stated clearly their intentions. They said that it was not their intention to pay players for home matches. If any profits accrued from their last match it would be “banked to form the nucleus of a ground fund. It will be the policy of the league to provide players with uniforms, free brake trips to grounds, and payment for loss of wages when away from Auckland on tour”. They went on to say that the tour had not been profitable. The money they had gained from Wellington's visit in August had been lost while on tour due to travel costs and other expenditure. They hoped to “stimulate a strong local competitions next season” and had secured a ground at Epsom for play.

== Representative matches ==
=== Auckland v Wellington (August 22) ===
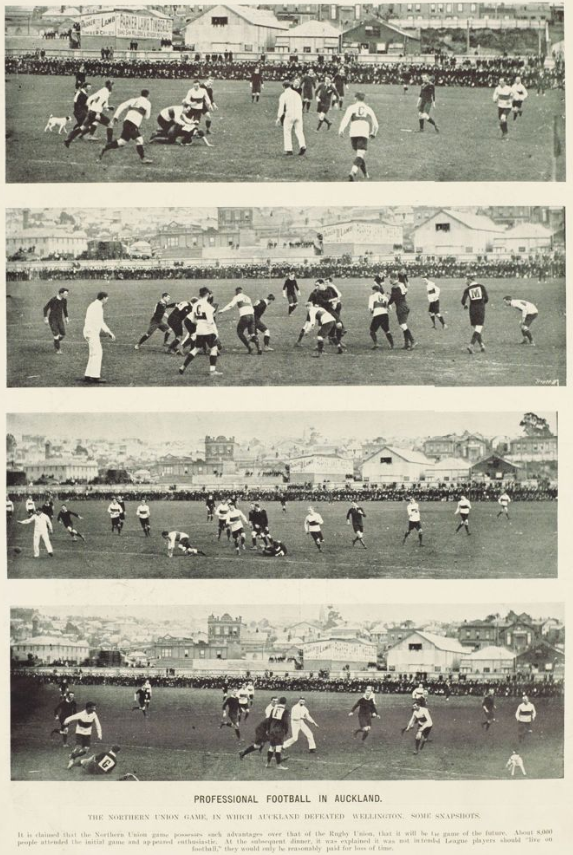

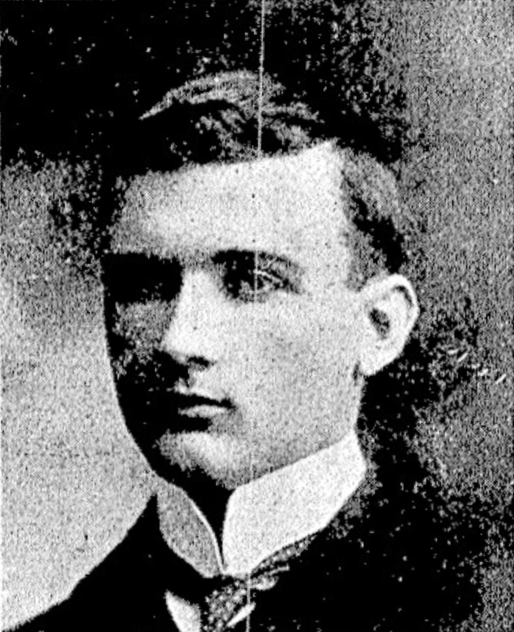
Harold Rowe, the first ever try scorer for Auckland.

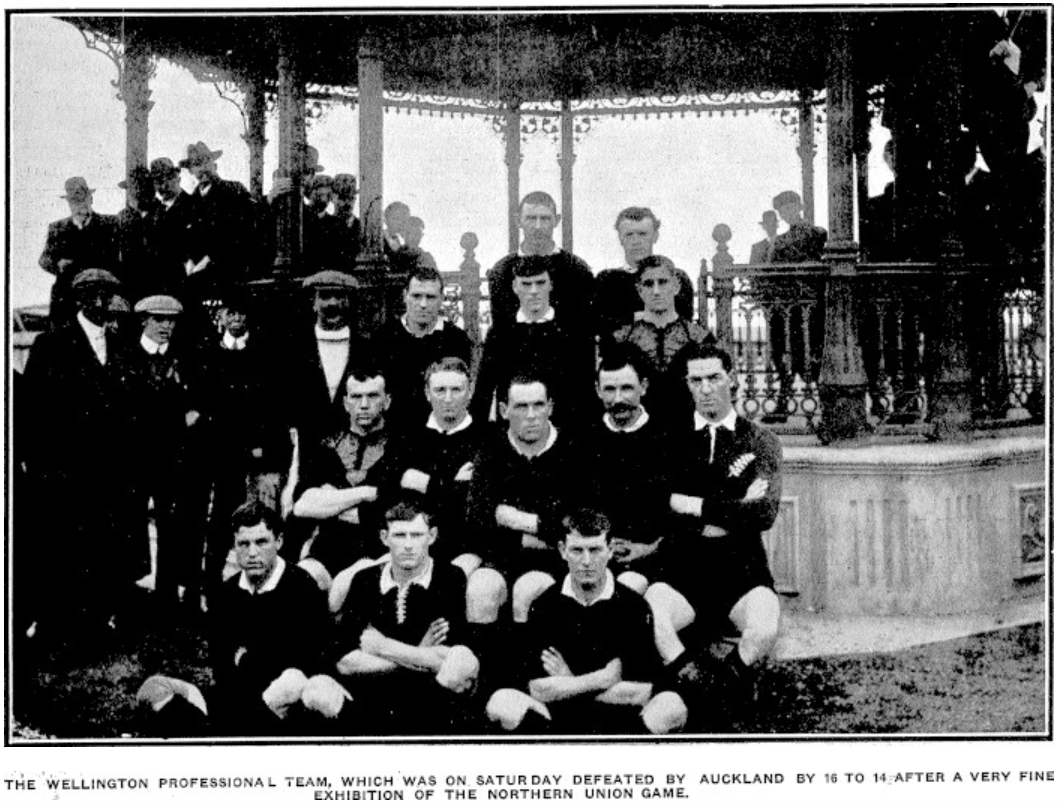
The Wellington team

The first ever match played by an Auckland side was between them and Wellington at Victoria Park in central Auckland. The Auckland Rugby League had not officially formed at this point with the sport very much in its infancy in New Zealand. The match featured 19 players out of the 26 who were current or future New Zealand representatives. The match was played in "perfect" weather in front of a large crowd of 7,000 who were "rewarded with a fast and exciting game". The Auckland team was led out by captain Richard Wynyard, with Wellington led out by their captain Charlie Pearce. Wellington won the toss and Auckland's William Trevarthen kicked off. Auckland moved quickly on to attack and Harold Rowe took a mark with Bill Tyler taking the kick and scoring the first ever points for Auckland after just three minutes. The game was said to have been "fast and willing" through the next period, traveling up and down the field with "the passing runs being loudly applauded". Wellington got on attack and halfback Arthur Kelly picked up the ball quickly and passed on to John Spencer who ran to the line and sent the ball on to Conrad Byrne who scored to give Wellington a 3–2 lead. Auckland responded with Rowe and Charles Dunning engaging in a passing run from their own twenty-five before Rowe scored and Tyler converted. Then Charles Dillamore took and mark and Tyler "landed a splendid goal". The match turned back Wellington's way when Daniel Gilchrist toed the ball ahead past Riley, and James Barber chasing after scored near the posts with George Spencer converting to narrow the margin to 9–8 on halftime. The second half opened with Auckland moving on to attack before Wellington took the ball back down the field. Then Ronald MacDonald saved for Auckland and Bill Mackrell followed up on a mark taken by Rowe to take play back into Wellignton's territory where Tyler kicked a penalty for Auckland to extend their lead to 11-8. Play was even for a time and then William Wynyard scored after a dodging run. Tyler missed the conversion but then made amends when he kicked a penalty from close to the halfway line to give Auckland a decisive 16–8 lead. Wellington weren't finished with yet and made a passing run involving Kelly, Albert House, Barber, Oliver Instone, and Dan Twohill who scored, though George Spencer failed with the conversion. Wellington kept pressing but Auckland took play through a passing bout back to Wellington's end but missed a goal from a mark. Wellington kicked down field and soon after P McGill scored a try after a "forward rush". Spencer however failed to convert the try which would have tied the scores which were now 16–14 in favour of Auckland. Auckland went on to attack with Mackrell breaking away and after some passing Tyler was stopped just on the line. Then Wellington missed a chance to score when J. Spencer failed to pass at the right moment and the full time bell rang to end the match with Auckland narrowly hanging on.

22 August	Auckland	16–14 (9-8)	Wellington	Victoria Park
3:10	Try: Harold Rowe, William Wynyard; Con: William Tyler 1/2; Pen: William Tyler 2/2, & 2/3 goals from marks		Try: Conrad Byrne, James Barber, Dan Twohill, P McGill; Con: George Spencer 1/4	Attendance: 7,000; Referee: Mr. J. (Tiffy) Lang

Team details

FB	1	Charles Dillamore
WG	2	Harold Rowe
CE	3	William Wynyard
WG	4	P Redwood
FE	5	Bill Tyler
FE	6	Sid Riley
HB	7	Richard Wynyard
PR	8	Bill Mackrell
HK	9	Charles Dunning
PR	10	William Trevarthen
SR	11	Ronald MacDonald
SR	12	Frederick Gladding
LF	13	Matt Hooper
Emergency:
EM	14
Coach:
?

FB	1	George Spencer
WG	2	Bert King
CE	3	Oliver Instone
WG	4	Dan Twohill
FE	5	Albert House
FE	6	James Barber
HB	7	Arthur Kelly
PR	8	P McGill
HK	9	Charlie Pearce
PR	10	Conrad Byrne
SR	11	John Spencer
SR	12	Daniel Gilchrist
LF	13	Adam Lile
Emergency:
EM	14	?
Coach:
?

=== Auckland v Wellington (September 12) ===
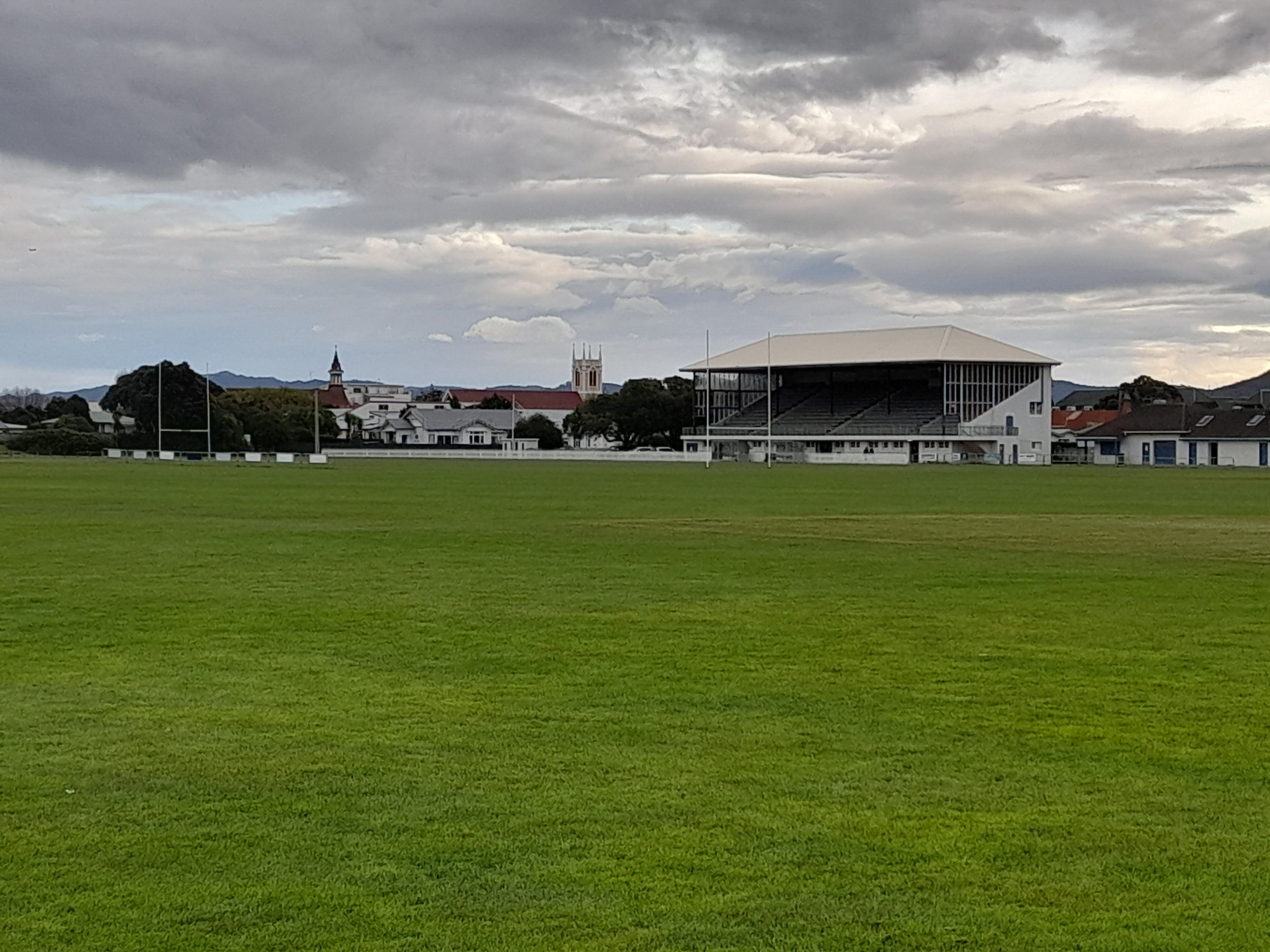
The Petone Recreation Ground.

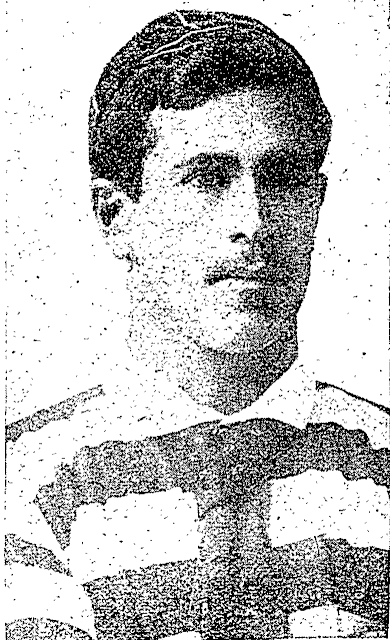
Albert Asher, Auckland's second try scorer. He had played 11 games for the All Blacks in 1903 and went on to represent New Zealand at rugby league 7 times from 1910 to 1913.

The second match between the two sides was played at the Petone Recreation Ground in Lower Hutt. There were special trains from the city which took patrons to the match with gate returns showing that "close upon 4,000 people passed through the turnstiles". The game was played in fine weather with a light breeze blowing from the Rimutaka's". The Dominion newspaper wrote that "both teams played hard football from start to finish, and the public were well satisfied with the display". Wellington won the toss and were the first to score. Auckland had made a nice passing rush through Charles Dillamore, Bill Tyler, and P. Redwood with the latter punting up field but then George Spencer returned play with a high kick with James Barber able to catch the ball on the full before passing to Oliver Instone who sent the ball on to Dan Twohill who scored near the posts with G. Spencer converting. The following play was characterised by even play but then good work by P. McGill and John Spencer saw Auckland forcing in their in goal. After the drop out Albert Asher made "a great run" and was only tackled on the Wellington line. Wellington were penalised and Dick Wynyard kicked across field to Harold Rowe who scored in the corner with Tyler missing the conversion. Shortly after the kickoff Wynyard took the ball from a scrum and passed to Tyler who sent the ball to Asher who "putting on the pace scored near the posts" and Tyler's conversion gave Auckland an 8–5 lead. Wellington then attacked hard and Auckland "had a fairly busy time to keep out the invaders". Wellington eventually scored however when Tyler gained possession from a scrum and passed to Barber, to Edward Tyne, who sent it back infield to Barber who again sent it back to Tyne and he was able to score in the corner. The conversion missed and the teams went to half time level at 8-8.

To start the second half Wellington attacked for five or six minutes and went close to scoring multiple times. Auckland then made a long run down field through Rowe, and clever passing took place amongst the Auckland team on a couple of occasions however Frank Barclay lost the ball and the Wellington forwards put them back on attack. Once again Auckland shifted play the other way and Matt Hooper looked certain to score but play was pulled back through a forward pass. Wellington put Auckland on the defensive and forced a drop out with J. Spencer picking the ball up after a "loose rush around halfway, and after a good dodgy run outstripped his opponents, and touched down neat the posts" with his brother George converting to put them in front 13-8. Wellington briefly moved on to attack but Barclay "with a dribbling rush transferred operations to the other end of the ground". Play moved up and down the field before Auckland made a passing movement which saw Matt Hooper scoring Auckland's third try. Tyler made a "splendid kick" to level the scores at 13-13. From the kickoff Dillamore and Tyler engaged in a passing movement and Auckland halfback Dick Wynyard had an unsuccessful drop kick attempt. The play moved around the field and then George Spencer made a long kick and Twohill ran through and tried to ground the ball for a try but knocked on. Soon after Spencer marked the ball near halfway but his shot at goal fell under the crossbar. The game finished shortly after with the scores tied.

12 September	Wellington	13–13 (8-8)	Auckland	Petone Recreation Ground, Lower Hutt
3:00	Try: Edward Tyne, Dan Twohill, John Spencer; Con: George Spencer 2/3; Pen: George Spencer 0/1 (mark)		Try: Harold Rowe, Albert Asher, Matt Hooper; Con: William Tyler 2/3; Drop: Dick Wynyard 0/1	Attendance: 4,000; Referee: L Isherwood

Team details

FB	1	George Spencer
WG	2	Edward Tyne
CE	3	Oliver Instone
CE	4	James Barber
WG	5	Dan Twohill
FE	6	Albert House
HB	7	Arthur Kelly
PR	8	Adam Lile
HK	9	Daniel Gilchrist
PR	10	P McGill
SR	11	Bert King
SR	12	John Spencer
LF	13	Henry Knight
Emergency:
Coach:

FB	1	Sid Riley
WG	2	Harold Rowe
CE	3	Charles Dillamore
CE	4	Albert Asher
WG	5	P Redwood
FE	6	Bill Tyler
HB	7	Dick Wynyard
PR	8	Bill Mackrell
HK	9	Charles Dunning
PR	10	Bill Trevarthen
SR	11	Ronald MacDonald
SR	12	Matt Hooper
LF	13	Frank Barclay
Emergency:
EM	14	Alf Chorley
Coach:

=== Auckland v Taranaki (September 17) ===
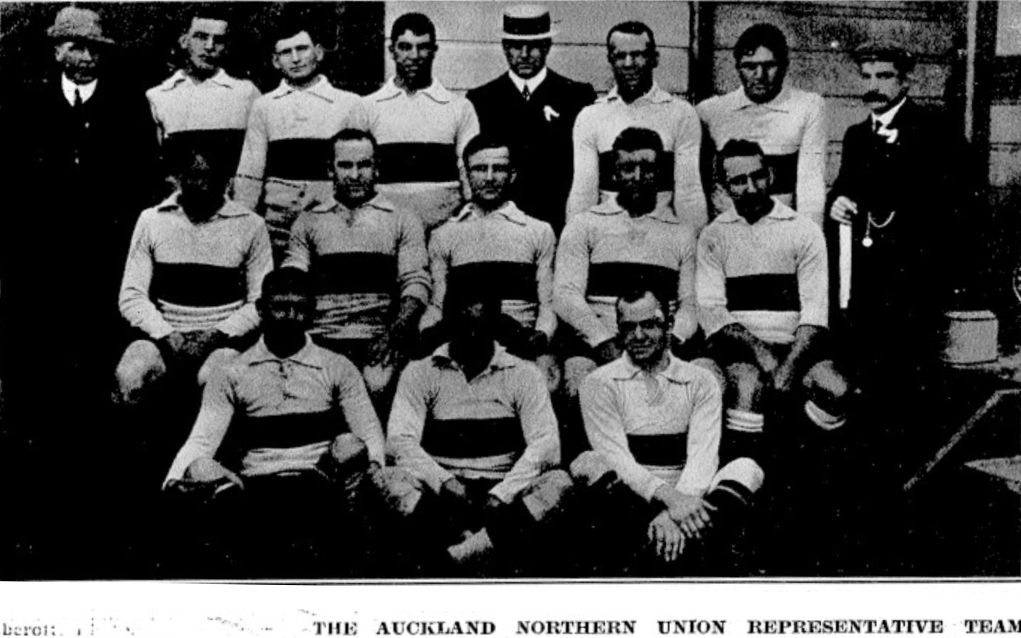
Auckland Team

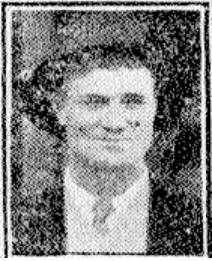
Arthur Hardgrave, the Taranaki try scorer. He transferred to Auckland in 1912 and played for Manukau, as well as debuting for New Zealand in 1912.

This match was originally supposed to be played on the recreation ground but after pressure from the rugby union it was moved to the Tukapa cricket field adjacent to Western Park. The weather was "damp and drizzly" on a Thursday with around 600 spectators in attendance. There were further issues with seating as the advertised seats for spectators did not arrive at the ground and the management committee controlling the match apologising for the situation. Taranaki won the match by 5 points to 3 and it was suggested that Auckland had deliberately thrown the match to stir up interest in the return match. Though the closeness of the game back in Auckland would suggest this might not have been the case. Much of the newspaper coverage was particularly negative with comments like "yesterday's game was equivalent to a poor amateur rugby match between two mediocre third-class teams. The chief object of the players seemed to be to keep the ball moving about the field. There were no good attacking back movements or scientific forward play". The Taranaki Daily News wrote a descriptive match report. They wrote that from the kickoff the Taranaki side "assumed aggressive tactics, but play travelled rapidly from end to end for some time, until Taranaki was awarded a free kick" and Arthur Hardgrave kicked a goal to give them a 2–0 lead. He missed another attempt soon after and Taranaki continued to attack but the Auckland defence held. Then Bill Tyler kicked through and chasing his own kick scored. Frederick Gladding's conversion attempt missed but Auckland now had a 3–2 lead which they held at halftime. The second half was marked by "more vim" than the first and Auckland kept Taranaki in their own 25 "for some minutes". Alf Chorley on Auckland's left wing was causing the Taranaki players a lot of trouble, and made "nice openings that Tyler or Albert Asher was quick to turn into good account". On one occasion Asher was tackled just in time by Gordon Hooker. Both backlines were putting in good passing movements and P Redwood, Asher, Dick Wynyard and Charles Dillamore "being very attractive". For Taranaki Adam Lile "was a tower of strength, knowing the game fully and often intercepting the moves of his late confreres. He was well backed by Bertie Frewin, Ernie Buckland, and Willie Maclean. Hardgraves good kicking also placed Auckland's fullback, Sid Riley in difficulty. Near the end of the game Sidney Stroud had a shot at goal for Taranaki but failed but just afterwards Hardgrave followed up a long kick and booted the ball from Riley's grip and he dived on it when it crossed the line to put Taranki 5-3 ahead. Auckland tried hard to win the game but the game ended with no further scoring. For Taranaki the best player was said to be Lile, with Hardgrave, Frewin, W. McLean, and Buckland also "prominent". For Auckland Tyler, Bill Mackrell, Chorley and Wynyard were "the best of a heavy and fast team". Arthur Hardgrave moved to Auckland in 1912 and joined the Manukau club and later played for Otahuhu Rovers, and Ponsonby United while also debuting for Auckland in 1912, and playing eight games for New Zealand from 1912 to 1914.

17 September	Taranaki	5–3	Auckland	Tukapa Cricket Field, New Plymouth
3:00	Try: Arthur Hardgrave; Con: Arthur Hardgrave 0/1; Pen: Arthur Hardgrave 1/2, Sidney Stroud 0/1		Try: Bill Tyler; Con: Frederick Gladding 0/1	Attendance: 600; Referee: H Gilboy

Team details

FB	1	Arthur Hardgrave 12st 2lb (Tukapa)
WG	2	Gordon Hooker 11st 11lb (Tukapa)
CE	3	Charles Maclean 11st (Star)
CE	4	Ernie Buckland
WG	5	B. O'Driscoll 10st 10lb (Star)
FE	6	Willie Maclean 11st (Tukapa)
HB	7	Bertie Frewin 11st (Tukapa)
PR	8	Sidney Stroud 12st 7lb (Star)
HK	9	Adam Lile
PR	10	J Johnson 12st (Tukapa)
SR	11	Walter Morris
SR	12	Edward Haskill 11st 2lb (Star)
LF	13	Tom Smith 12st 2lb (Star)
Emergency:
Coach:

FB	1	Sid Riley
WG	2	Alf Chorley
CE	3	Albert Asher
CE	4	P Redwood
WG	5	Charles Dillamore
FE	6	Bill Tyler
HB	7	Dick Wynyard
PR	8	Ronald MacDonald
HK	9	Matt Hooper
PR	10	Frederick Gladding
SR	11	Bill Mackrell
SR	12	Matt Hooper
LF	13	Charles Dunning
Emergency:
Coach:

=== Auckland v Taranaki (October 10) ===
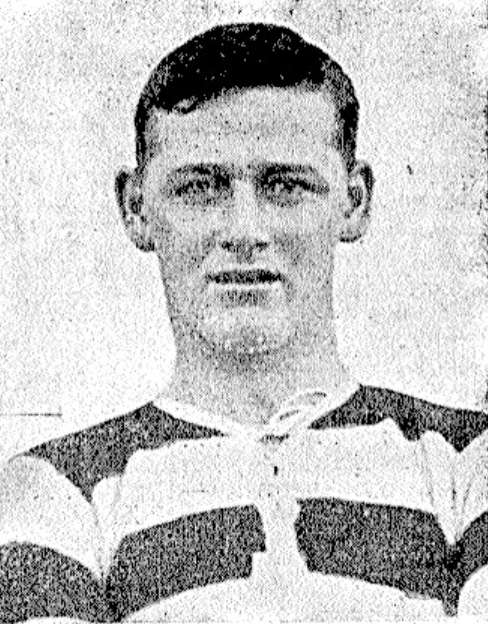
Try scorer for Auckland, Richard Wynyard

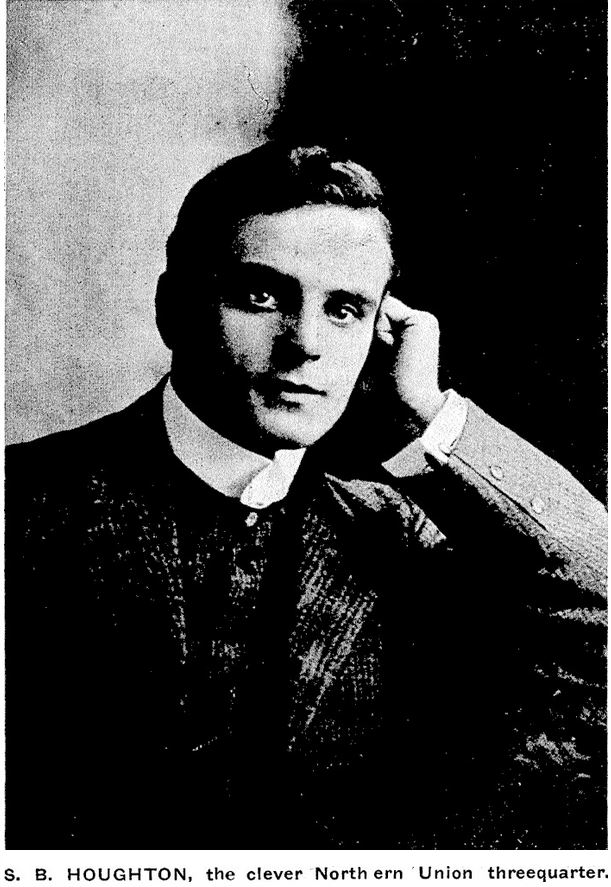

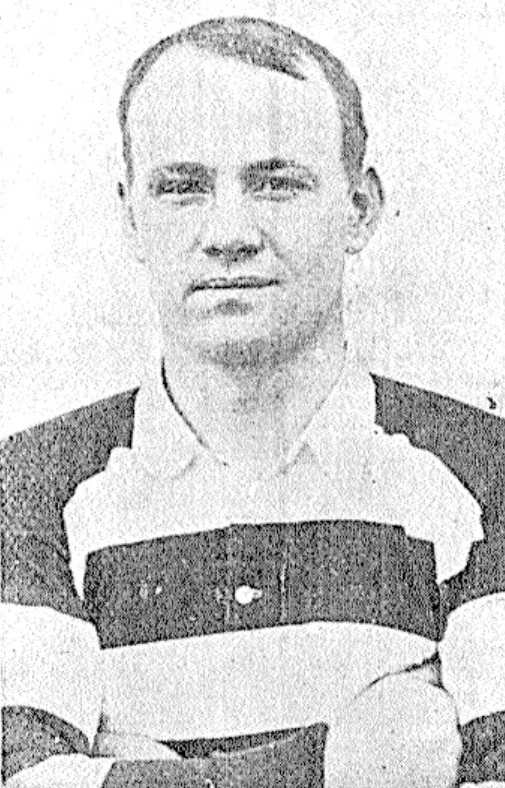
Ronald MacDonald Auckland's prop who scored Auckland's second try.

Auckland won narrowly, outscoring Taranaki by 5 tries to 4 before a crowd of 3,000 at Victoria Park. Taranaki won the toss and chose to play from the western end having the advantage of the sun and wind in the first half. William Trevarthen kicked off for Auckland at 3:08. Play was even for a while until Albert Asher hurdled an opponent, a tactic which he was well known for. This shifted play to the Taranaki end for a while before Bertie Frewin kicked into Auckland territory. Auckland then made a passing movement with Samuel Houghton handing to Asher and taking play down field before Bill Tyler had a shot at goal from a mark which fell short. Gordon Hooker, the Taranaki winger kicked and Willie Maclean chasing it nearly scored. The game continued to move up and down the field until eventually Harold Rowe picked up the ball and made a break before sending it to Tyler who outpaced Arthur Hardgrave and scored by the posts and converted his own try to give Auckland a 5–0 lead. Taranaki quickly responded and Ernie Buckland snapped up the ball and made a "beautiful dodgy run" and scored with Hardgrave's conversion tying the scores. Auckland attacked from the kickoff but Alf Chorley "spoilt a good chance by failing to take a pass from William Wynyard and then Taranaki took play back to the Auckland line and were denied twice from scoring. W. Wynyard and Asher took play down field and Asher was well stopped by Hardgrave who saved a certain try. Then Asher went over the line but was knocked into touch in goal, before Alex Stanaway also crossed the line but was called back as he had gone into touch before reaching the try line. Eventually Auckland's efforts were rewarded when Ronald MacDonald "bustled" his way over from a scrum with Tyler failing to convert. With halftime coming the scores were 8–7 in favour of Auckland. Sidney Stroud started the second half and Auckland got on attack through a passing movement with Houghton passing to Dick Wynyard to Chorley who ruined the move with a poor pass to Rowe. However they kept the pressure on and S. Houghton picked the ball up and sent it to Rowe who ran around B O'Driscoll and Hardgrave and he scored under the posts. Tyler missed the conversion but Auckland now led 11-7. Shortly after Wynyard dodged his way through and scored with Asher missing the conversion. Taranaki responded when Willie Mclean picked the ball up from the feet of the Auckland forwards and "swerved past all the Auckland rear division" and scored with Hardgrave's conversion cutting the score to 14–12 in Auckland's favour. Play was now "very fast" travelling up and down the field before Thomas Houghton succeeded "in placing a beautiful goal" to put Auckland 16–12 up. Taranaki attacked and Ernie Buckland crossed but the conversion missed, Auckland now just one point in front, 16-15. The visitors were now having the better of the play and Auckland defended for a while but eventually Willie Mclean picked up the ball and sent it to Charles Mclean who in turn passed to Hooker who outpaced Asher and scored giving them their first lead of the game. They continued to attack and came very close to scoring however Dick Wynyard made a break and sent the ball to Tyler who sent it on to Rowe and then so S. Marshall who scored. Marshall converted his own try and Auckland was back in front 21-18. The game finished with Auckland attacking hard, forcing Taranaki to force down three times before the final whistle came. The New Zealand Herald said that the best players for each team were Hardgrave, W. McLean, Frewin, and Buckland for Taranaki, and Rowe, Asher, R. Wynyard, Macdonald, and William Trevarthen for Auckland.

10 October	Auckland	21–18	Taranaki	Victoria Park
3:00	Try: Harold Rowe, Richard Wynyard, William Tyler, Ronald MacDonald, S Marshall; Con: William Tyler 1/3, S Marshall 1/1, Albert Asher 0/1; Pen: Thomas Houghton 1/1		Try: Gordon Hooker 2, Ernie Buckland, Willie Maclean; Con: Arthur Hardgrave 2/4; Pen: Arthur Hardgrave (mark 1/3)	Attendance: 3,000; Referee: William Mackrell

Team details

FB	1	Thomas Houghton
WG	2	Harold Rowe
CE	3	Alf Chorley
CE	4	William Wynyard
WG	5	Albert Asher
FE	6	Dick Wynyard
HB	7	Samuel Houghton
PR	8	William Trevarthen
HK	9	Bill Tyler
PR	10	Ronald MacDonald
SR	11	Matt Hooper
SR	12	Alex Stanaway
LF	13	S Marshall
Emergency:
Coach:

FB	1	Arthur Hardgrave
WG	2	Gordon Hooker
CE	3	Charles Maclean
CE	4	Willie Maclean
WG	5	B O'Driscoll
FE	6	Ernie Buckland
HB	7	Bertie Frewin
PR	8	Louis Walsh
HK	9	Edward Haskell
PR	10	Tom Smith
SR	11	Sidney Stroud
SR	12	C Johnson
LF	13	Walter Morris
Emergency: C Potier
Coach:

== Auckland representative matches played and scorers ==
Matches and Points
Player	Played	Tries	Conv	Pen	Marks	DG	Points
William Tyler	4	2	4/8	2/2	2/3	-	22
Harold Rowe	3	3	-	-	-	-	9
S Marshall	1	1	1/1	-	-	-	5
Richard Wynyard	4	1	-	-	-	0/1	3
Ronald MacDonald	4	1	-	-	-	-	3
Matt Hooper	4	1	-	-	-	-	3
Albert Asher	3	1	0/1	-	-	-	3
William Wynyard	2	1	-	-	-	-	3
Thomas Houghton	1	-	-	1/1	-	-	2
Bill Trevarthen	4	-	-	-	-	-	0
Charles Dillamore	3	-	-	-	-	-	0
P Redwood	3	-	-	-	-	-	0
Sid Riley	3	-	-	-	-	-	0
William Mackrell	3	-	-	-	-	-	0
Charles Dunning	3	-	-	-	-	-	0
Alf Chorley	2	-	-	-	-	-	0
Fred Gladding	2	-	0/1	-	-	-	0
Frank Barclay	1	-	-	-	-	-	0
Alex Stanaway	1	-	-	-	-	-	0
Samuel Houghton	1	-	-	-	-	-	0
TOTAL	52	11	5/11	3/3	2/3	0/1	53
