= 1909 Auckland Rugby League season =

The 1909 Auckland Rugby League season was the league's first ever official season. It celebrated its centenary in 2009. Four representative matches had been played in 1908 as players in Auckland attempted to showcase the new code to both Auckland residents and those elsewhere.

Preceded by 1908	1st Auckland Rugby League season 1909	Succeeded by 1910

== First meeting ==
A meeting of players was held on Monday 12 July where it was decided to call for another meeting the following Monday and to invite all interested parties to attend. The ultimate aim was to form a league. It was also stated that "three clubs will be formed, two in the city and one at the North Shore". The meeting was duly held on 19 July at the Chamber of Commerce on Swanson Street. Mr. A.E. Glover, M.P., occupied the chair, and there was a large attendance of around 150 supporters and players. They were to affiliate with the Northern Union and hold a practice match on the following Saturday. "Mr. R. Eagleton offered the league the use of three suitable playing grounds in Epsom". The ground was located near Potters Paddock which was later converted into Alexandra Racecourse. Elections for officers were also held with 14 appointments made.

== North Shore Albions formed ==
A further meeting was held at North Shore on the Wednesday evening at the Council Chambers in Devonport with 40 in attendance, and a club was formed. It was noted that they had the playing numbers for two teams and they had "taken the pick of the amateur players of the district club". The club would be called North Shore Albions. On the Thursday night a preliminary meeting was held in the city with 20 players attending with the goal of forming a club that was either a city team or a combination of a city and Ponsonby team, while a Newton club was also aimed to be formed the following week as there was "considerable dissatisfaction among the members at the management of the Auckland Union". It was decided to play a match on the Saturday between the North Shore team and the city team. The match was duly played between North Shore and City and resulted in a win to the former by 44 points to 22.

Chairman of the league, D.W. McLean spoke with a representative of The New Zealand Herald and was reported as saying the following; "no payment would be made for playing, but the men when away from home would be recompensed for lost time. They would provide players with uniforms free in order that a team might take the field in a regulation costume, not in varied coloured pants and stockings, as is often seen even in rep. Rugby matches. Their meetings would be open to the press and full information will be given to the public of all moneys received and expended...". He "spoke enthusiastically of the possibilities of the new code, from which he contended the rougher elements of rugby had been removed, this providing a game which was full of bright play and sparkling situations. The liability of getting hurt had been greatly reduced by the removal of scrums and line-out play". It was also reported that several prominent players, questioned about why they had left the Rugby Union game said that "they were tired of the unequalness of the contests under the present system. There was no sport in being beaten by 61 points to nil as the North Shore seniors were recently by the Ponsonby team... the management of the Auckland Union was not mindful enough of the clubs’ or players interests".

== Ponsonby United foundation ==
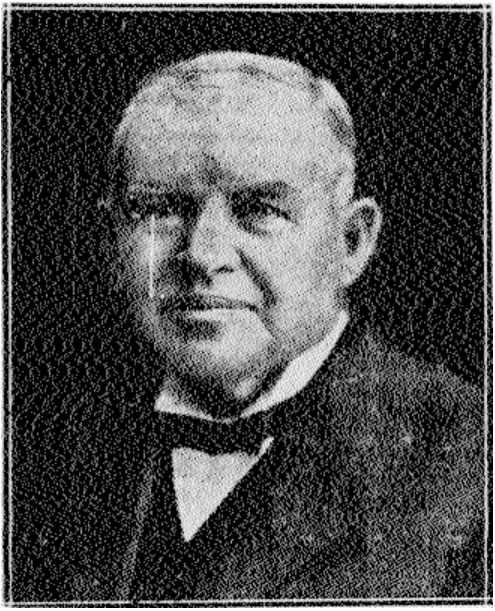
James Carlaw.

At a meeting at Leys Institute on 30 July the Ponsonby club was formed. There were 50 supporters present with Mr. A Thompson chairing the meeting. Also in attendance were Mr James Carlaw, along with Arthur Carlaw, Charles Dunning, and Jack Stanaway. They called for another meeting to be held the following week to enroll players. They played a match against Newton Rangers on August 21 which they won by 16 points to 6.

== Representative matches ==
Auckland played four representative matches, though the first match was still prior to the official formation of the league. They played the New Zealand Maori team, two matches against Taranaki, one against Wellington, and a further match against Rotorua which was a largely junior side. The match versus Wellington on 9 October drew 4,000 spectators and raised £122 for the Auckland Rugby League.

=== Auckland v NZ Maori ===
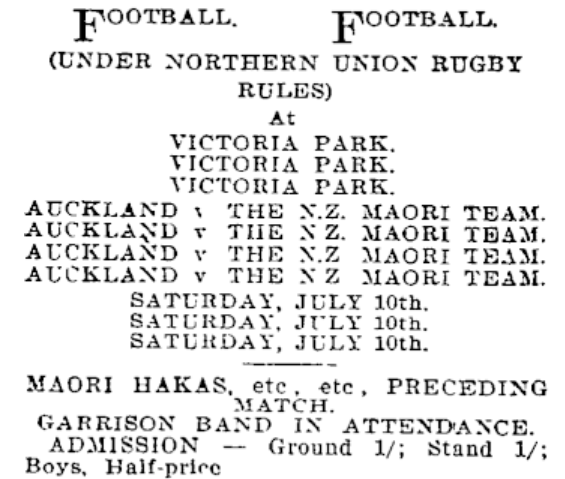

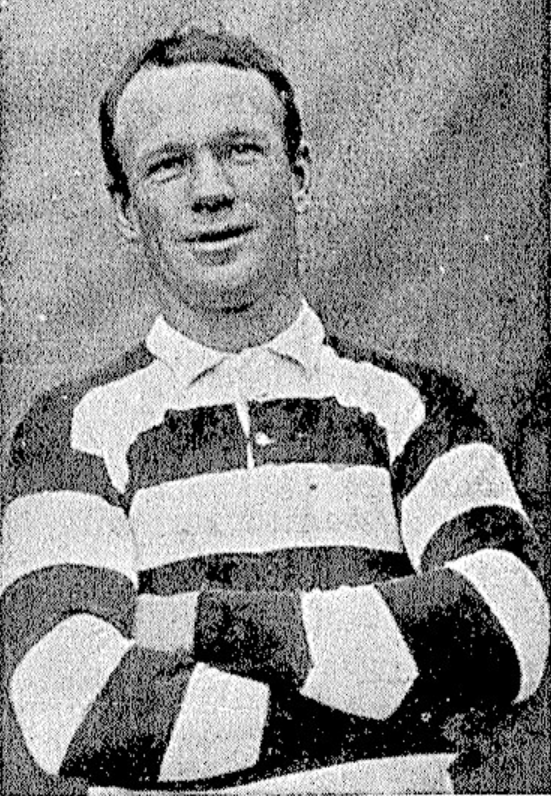
Charles Dunning who had played rugby union for Gisborne, Auckland and the North Island. He switched codes and played for New Zealand 22 times from 1907 to 1912.

Auckland played the New Zealand Māori team on 10 July which was preparing to depart for a tour of Australia. The Auckland team was victorious by 21 points to 14 in front of a crowd estimated at 3,000. Proceeds from the match were to go towards the formation and establishment of the league. Auckland City Council granted use of Victoria Park for the match and allowed for an admission charge "not exceeding one shilling for each person... with an extra shilling for every horse or vehicle, and an additional charge not exceeding one shilling for each person for admission to the pavilion". The Māori side had been based in Te Kūiti with Frank Barclay (Francis Hauāuru Barclay (Pakere)) tutoring the side. He had been a member of the last 'native' team to tour Australia. The Auckland team was preparing hard under the guidance of William Mackrell. The NZ Māori team were captained by Nikorima Ratete (Nikki Rogers), while the Auckland side were captained by Dick Wynyard. The Māori side wore all black uniforms while the Auckland team was in white jerseys. The ground was soaked and when the forwards were moving together the ground was ploughed up resembling a "quagmire" with a greasy ball making handling difficult. The sun was out however when Glen Barclay (Punga Pakere) kicked off. Wynyard "showed some of his old form by working a tricky run, which was only stopped" by Riki Papakura the MZ Māori fullback. A few minutes later however Charles Dunning got possession and scored with Bill Tyler kicking "a lovely goal". The NZ Māori side responded from a nice pass and rush movement when five eighth Nirai Whareure (Ned McRae) sent the ball out to Albert Asher (Arapeta Paurini Wharepapa) who streaked down the whole length of the field and then passed to his brother Ernie Asher (Te Keepa Pouwhiuwhiu) who was "bumped out at the corner flag". Ernie Asher missed a penalty attempt at goal however soon after Glen Barclay carried play to the Auckland line and Ernie Asher crossed for a try but missed his own conversion. Asher was playing a "splendid game" and gaining possession on the halfway line he ran down the sideline beating all opponents until tackled by William Wynyard. The play "raged up and down the field" before the Māori side gave away a penalty but S. Marshall's attempted shot "failed to allow for the wind". The Māori side "continued to force the game and the outcome of a good rush and a scrum in Auckland's 25 saw the ball flung into "Opai" Asher's hands, and following an old trick of his, he jumped clean over W. Wynyard's head and scored". Alex Stanaway's (Ariki Haira) conversion missed but they now had a 6-5 lead. Albert Asher then made a couple more nice runs and came close to scoring. However the Auckland forwards through Frederick Neighbour, Dunning, Bill Mackrell, and Richard Wells moved play down the field using "aggressive tactics". Another "fine passing rush, started by [Dick] Wynyard, ended in Thomas Houghton (who until recently, was playing with St Helens) in England got over the line to give Auckland an 8-6 lead at half time with Marshall failing to convert. At the start of the second half Papakura came up from fullback to the three quarter line with Ernie Asher shifting back. Auckland immediately broke through and Charles Linkhorn "scored an easy try feinting towards Neighbour, and then slipping over the line" with Marshall converting. NZ Māori responded with Te Raira Pukere, Haira, and Roera making a great rush and Asher came in to join. A forward scramble ensued in Auckland's 25 and Haira got over the line though Asher failed to convert. Auckland got on attack and Mackrell pushed his way through and then drew Papakura before passing to Linkhorn who outpaced the chasers to score with Bill Tyler converting. The crowd which was said to have been "out of hand all the afternoon" now began to surge over the side lines and the two lone police constables "were totally incapable of exercising any authority and the remainder of the game was robbed of half of its interest". Mackrell, Tyler, and the Wynyard brothers "were prominent in a rush" and from a scrum close to the sideline Frank Woodward picked up the ball and scored with Tyler converting. Play moved up and down the field once more and Rewi Maniapoto (Sid Ellis), and G. Barclay made a good run and crossed the line but the referee (Matt Hooper) pulled it back for an infringement. They continually made breaks but were criticised for not following up in support often enough and many chances were lost. They were finally successful when Maniapoto took the ball from Ratete and he scored with Haira converting.

10 July	Auckland	21–14 (8-6)	NZ Māori	Victoria Park
3:00	Try: Charles Dunning, Thomas Houghton, Charles Linkhorn 2, Frank Woodward; Con: William Tyler 2/3, S Marshall 1/2; Pen: S Marshall 0/1 (mark)		Try: Ernie Asher, Albert Asher, Alex Stanaway, Rewi Maniapoto; Con: Alex Stanaway 1/2, Ernie Asher 0/2; Pen: Ernie Asher 0/1	Attendance: 3,000; Referee: Matt Hooper

Team details

FB	1	William Wynyard
WG	2	S Marshall
CE	3	Thomas Houghton
WG	4	Frank Woodward
FE	5	Jack Stanaway (Hone Haira)
FE	6	Bill Tyler
HB	7	Richard Wynyard (captain)
PR	8	Richard Wells
HK	9	Frederick Neighbour
PR	10	William Mackrell
SR	11	Charles Dunning
SR	12	Jim Griffen
LF	13	Charles Linkhorn
Emergency:
EM	14
Coach: William Mackrell
?

FB	1	Riki Papakura
WG	2	Albert Asher
CE	3	Glen Barclay (Glenville Te Punga o Te Arawa Barclay)
WG	4	Ernie Asher
FE	5	Hone Tuki
FE	6	Nirai Whareure (Ned McRae)
HB	7	Nikorima Ratete (Nikki Rogers) (captain)
PR	8	Alex Stanaway (Ariki Haira)
HK	9	Witana Mare
PR	10	Te Raira Pukere
SR	11	Frank Barclay
SR	12	Rewi Maniapoto (Sid Ellis)
LF	13	Tutu Roera
Emergency:
EM	14	Pou Kopana (Paul Coban)
Coach: Barclay
?

=== Auckland Trial Match (A Team v B Team) ===
A trial match was played to choose the Auckland team to play Taranaki. The match was refereed by Lance Todd. At the conclusion of the game sole selector William Wynyard chose the Auckland side. It was said that it was "not a good exhibition" though to be expected given the circumstances. There was no scoring reported by either the Auckland Star or the New Zealand Herald.

31 July	A Team	29-37	B Team	Victoria Park
3:00	Try: Unknown; Con: Unknown		Try: Unknown; Con: Unknown	Referee: Lance Todd

Team details

FB	1	Samuel Houghton
WG	2	Frederick Gladding
CE	3	Frank Woodward
WG	4	Arthur Carlaw
FE	5	Bill Tyler
FE	6	William Wynyard
HB	7	Len Farrant
PR	8	Charles Dunning
HK	9	Todd
PR	10	A Allan
SR	11	H McReynolds
SR	12	J Williams
LF	13	Richard Wells

FB	1	J.P. (Percy) Gerrard
WG	2	Smith
CE	3	Alf Chorley
CE	4	Jack Stanaway
FE	5	Ronald MacDonald
FE	6	Frederick Neighbour
HB	7	Alfred Jackson
PR	8	B Wells
HK	9	William Mackrell
PR	10	Jim Griffen
SR	11	S Marshall
SR	12	George Seagar
LF	13	Charles Linkhorn

=== Auckland v Taranaki ===
The Auckland side captained by Richard Wynyard.

Taranaki team.

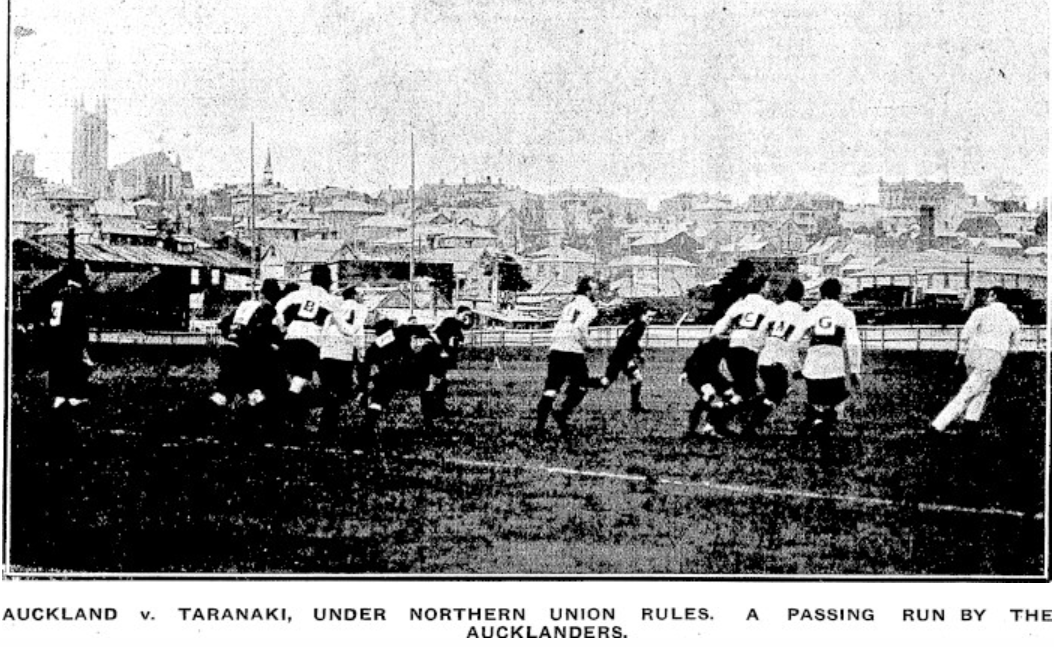

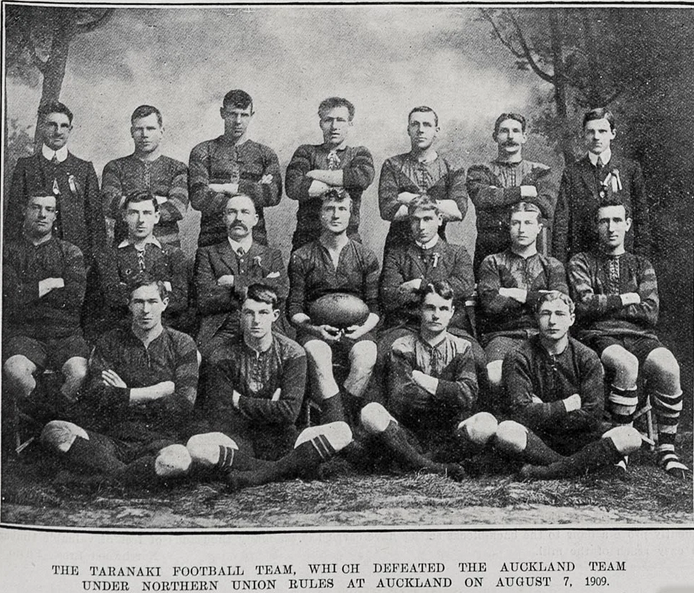
The Taranaki side.

Action from the match with a Taranaki player making a tackle.

Play in the curtain-raiser between City and North Shore juniors.

The match against Taranaki marked the first 'official' Auckland team as it was selected after an actual league had formed despite Auckland teams playing in 1908 while the sport was being established. Taranaki upset the home team 8–7. The Taranaki team reportedly had a "rough trip" by sea from New Plymouth and were met at Onehunga by the executive of the Auckland Rugby League on Friday morning. The match was refereed by Lance Todd and he was said to have been "very strict on anything in the shape of rough play". William Mackrell was originally named in the Auckland front row but was injured and unable to play with Frederick Neighbour taking his place. Both teams filed out on to the field at 3:10 and Auckland having won the toss decided to play from the western end with a "strong breeze" behind them. Sidney Stroud, the Taranaki front rower kicked off. Play was even for some time before Auckland got away but Arthur Carlaw passed forward to Frank Woodward. Auckland continued to attack and then a wild pass was thrown by a Taranaki back on his own goal line and Charles Dunning picked up the ball and scored. Woodward converted to give the hosts a 5-0 lead. Fast play followed the kickoff and Edward Haskell broke away and from loose play Auckland was penalised for a late tackle with Arthur Hardgrave missing a penalty attempt and soon after from another infringement he had another effort but missed once more. It began to rain and the ball became greasy but the backs were still "handling the ball in good style". Carlaw secured a mark in a good field position and Neighbour kicked a "good goal" putting Auckland 7-0 in front. Taranaki were beating Auckland for the ball in the scrum and their backs were making some good runs but the Auckland defence was "sound". Then Stroud got away with the ball at his feet and "badly beat Samuel Houghton" and when a try seemed certain Carlaw got back and saved for Auckland with halftime coming soon after. Richard Wells kicked off for Auckland and Taranaki moved immediately on to attack but Auckland saved and shifted play up the other end where Woodward had an unsuccessful drop goal attempt. Taranaki had a turn on attack and halfback Bertie Frewin marked close to goal but Hardgrave's attempt went wide. W Morris then instead of going for the line himself looked for somebody to pass too and Auckland relieved the pressure. From a scrum the Auckland halfback, Richard Wynyard got possession and "with a beautiful bit of work, beat more than half the opposing team, and removed the scene of play to Taranaki's 25". Taranaki kicked back down field and George Seagar gave away a penalty but once more the Taranaki attempt at goal went wide. Taranaki attacked again from the kick out and a forward rush beat the Auckland backs and Edward Haskell scored a try with Frewin's conversion missing. Then soon after T. Smith scored again for Taranaki when he outpaced Alf Chorley who had moved from the wing to replace Houghton at fullback. Hardgrave kicked the conversion and the visitors now led 8-7. Play was even for a while before Auckland made a strong rush but Hardgrave stopped it with a "clever mark" and they pushed play back to Auckland's line. Louis Walsh took a mark for Taranaki from a kick by Carlaw and Hardgrave took a shot but missed. A few exciting minutes play ensued but there was no further scoring and Taranaki had a famous one point victory. The Auckland Star wrote that for Taranaki Arthur Hardgrave was "a tower of strength to his side, and was probably the best player on the ground" despite an off day with the boot where he missed 2 penalties and 2 goals from marks. While Frewin at halfback "got in a lot of good work, as did Charles MacLean, and Ernie Buckland in the three quarter line. Smith, Haskell, and Stroud were about the pick of the forwards". For Auckland Alf Chorley, Alfred Jackson, Woodward, and Carlaw were the best of the backs with the forwards being relatively even. Prior to the representative match a curtain raiser was played between North Shore Juniors and a City side with the City juniors winning 2-0.

7 August	Auckland	7–8 (7-0)	Taranaki	Victoria Park
3:10	Try: Charles Dunning; Con: Frank Woodward 1/1; Pen: Frederick Neighbour 1/1 (mark); Drop: Frank Woodward 0/1		Try: Edward Haskell, T Smith; Con: Arthur Hardgrave 1/1, Bertie Frewin 0/1; Pen: Arthur Hardgrave 0/2 & 0/2 (from marks)	Attendance: 5,700; Referee: Lance Todd

Team details

FB	1	Sam Houghton
WG	2	Alf Chorley
CE	3	Frank Woodward
CE	4	Arthur Carlaw
FE	5	Ronald MacDonald
FE	6	Richard Wynyard
HB	7	Alfred Jackson
PR	8	Richard Wells
HK	9	Frederick Neighbour
PR	10	Charles Dunning
SR	11	Jim Griffen
SR	12	Charles Linkhorn
LF	13	George Seagar
Emergency:
EM	14
Coach:
?

FB	1	Arthur Hardgrave
WG	2	Ernie Buckland
CE	3	C Moir
CE	4	Willie McLean
FE	5	Charles McLean
FE	6	Wally Morey
HB	7	Bertie Frewin
PR	8	Louis Walsh
HK	9	W Morris
PR	10	Sidney Stroud
SR	11	Edward Haskell
SR	12	T Smith
LF	13	Bert O'Driscoll
Emergency:
EM	14
Coach:
?

=== Auckland Trial Match ===
On Sunday, 12 September a trial match was played at Eagleton's Paddock in Epsom between A and B teams. The A team won by 22 points to 8 with tries for the A team to Arthur Carlaw 2, Alfred Jackson, William Mackrell, George Seagar, and William Winter, with Dick Bradburn kicking 2 conversions. The Auckland Star reported that "the men are showing improved form, and a very fast and open game was witnessed, Opae Asher, Richard Wynyard, and Frank Woodward showing up splendidly in the backs, while Jim Griffen, William Mackrell, Bill Tyler, Richard Wells, and Frederick Neighbour were most prominent in the forwards". After the game William Wynyard, the sole Auckland selector chose the team to travel to New Plymouth to play Taranaki on September 16.

12 September	A Team	22-8	B Team	Eagleton's Paddock, Epsom
3:00	Try: George Seagar, William Mackrell, Arthur Carlaw 2, Alfred Jackson, William Winter; Con: Dick Bradburn 2		Try: Frederick Neighbour, Smith; Con: Frederick Neighbour	Referee: Fred Gladding

Team details

FB	1	Jack Stanaway (Hone Haira)
WG	2	Arthur Carlaw
CE	3	Frank Woodward
WG	4	Alf Chorley
FE	5	Albert Asher
FE	6	Alfred Jackson
HB	7	Richard Wynyard (captain)
PR	8	William Mackrell
HK	9	Charles Dunning
PR	10	Jim Griffen
SR	11	Dick Bradburn
SR	12	George Seagar
LF	13	William Winter
Emergency:
EM	14
Coach:
?

FB	1	Ferguson
WG	2	Smith
CE	3	Glen Barclay (Glenville Te Punga o Te Arawa Barclay)
WG	4	Lynch
FE	5	J Percival
FE	6	S Marshall
HB	7	Webb
PR	8	Richard Wells
HK	9	William Tyler
PR	10	H McReynolds
SR	11	Warner
SR	12	Frederick Neighbour
LF	13	Oliver
Emergency:
EM	14
Coach:
?

=== Auckland v Taranaki ===
William Wynyard then selected the team to face Taranaki in New Plymouth and they fared better this time winning by 27 points to 11. They traveled by train on September 13 to Onehunga before traveling by boat to New Plymouth. There were 2,000 spectators present at the match which was played at the Recreation Ground (Pukekura Park) with the Garrison Band supplying the music prior to the match and during the interval. Taranaki started the game well and withing two minutes of the kickoff C Moir, their centre had got through and scored with Arthur Hardgrave converting. Auckland went quickly on to attack and the ball went out of bounds just before Jim Griffen could get it and score. The ball was now traveling quickly up and down the field before Willie Mclean and P. Allan both nearly scored for the home side. Both teams made "decidedly good" passing movements. Ernie Buckland stopped a promising Auckland move but they got back soon after and Arthur Carlaw scored with Frederick Neighbour missing the conversion. Auckland was winning much more ball from the scrums and were soon in the Taranaki 25 again with Frank Woodward scoring and Dick Bradburn converting to give them an 8-5 lead. Taranaki showed some aggression and B. Mclean scored with Sidney Stroud missing the conversion. Halftime came with the scores 8-8. Auckland attacked early after the restart but the play was said to have slowed down from the first half. Bradburn kicked a goal from a free kick and shortly after he kicked a goal from a mark taken by Asher putting Auckland 12-8 ahead. T Smith then scored a try for Taranaki and despite a good effort Hardgrave's conversion attempt missed. Auckland then made a passing rush and got into Taranaki's end but T. Smith broke away before he was overhauled by Albert Asher. From this point on Auckland held the upper hand and scored three tries. The first was to Jim Griffen after William Mackrell and Richard Wells took play to the other end. The game was said to have become monotonous by this time with Auckland winning all the scrum ball and their backs were "completely outwitting the locals". Richard Wynyard scored a "splendid" try "after dodging right through the ambers" and the crowd began to thin out when the referee Lance Todd awarded a penalty try. It came when Alfred Jackson was obstructed by Hardgrave a few yards from the line, and was William Mackrell was grounding the ball over the line for a try the referee blew his whistle and "rightly awarded a try to Auckland". Dick Bradburn converted all three tries to complete the scoring.

16 September	Taranaki	11–27	Auckland	Recreation Sports Ground (Pukekura Park), New Plymouth
3:00	Try: C Moir, Willie McLean, T Smith; Con: Arthur Hardgrave 1/2, Sidney Stroud 0/1		Try: Frank Woodward, Arthur Carlaw, Richard Wynyard, Jim Griffen, William Mackrell (obstruction Try); Con: Dick Bradburn 4/4, Frederick Neighbour 0/1; Pen: Dick Bradburn 1/1 & 1/1 (mark)	Attendance: 2,000; Referee: Lance Todd

Team details

FB	1	Arthur Hardgrave
WG	2	Ernie Buckland
CE	3	C Moir
WG	4	Charles Maclean
FE	5	Willie Mclean
FE	6	Wally Morey
HB	7	Bertie Frewin
PR	8	Louis Walsh
HK	9	Walter Morris
PR	10	Sidney Stroud
SR	11	Edward Haskell
SR	12	Tom Smith
LF	13	P Allen
Emergency:
EM	14
Coach:
?

FB	1	Frederick Neighbour
WG	2	Albert Asher
CE	3	Arthur Carlaw
WG	4	Frank Woodward
FE	5	Smith
FE	6	Alfred Jackson
HB	7	Richard Wynyard (captain)
PR	8	William Mackrell
HK	9	Bill Tyler
PR	10	Jim Griffen
SR	11	Dick Bradburn
SR	12	Richard Wells
LF	13	George Seagar
Emergency:
EM	14	Alf Chorley
Coach:
Manager: H.G. Jones
?

=== Auckland B v Rotorua ===
An Auckland B traveled to Rotorua to play the local side and was well beaten by a much better team led by Riki Papakura (Dick Thom) who had recently been in the Māori rugby league team which toured Australia and Rukingi Reke (Joseph Rogers) who would play for New Zealand in 1912. The Auckland team was selected by William Wynyard and was largely a junior side though it did feature several more experienced players such as Wynyard's brother, Richard Wynyard, Frank Woodward and Frederick Neighbour. Hugh Haswell, the Newton player who played outside centre for Auckland was later killed in World War 1 on November 14, 1917 near Jaffa, Palestine aged 30. The team departed by train at 10am on September 1, the day before the match. There was a "great amount of interest, [the] large crowd of spectators watching" saw a match which was won by the local team with ludicrous ease". The Auckland B side "made a poor showing" as the 33-8 score reflected. The home team "as an all-round combination, was superior, but the visitors owe their downfall to the forwards, who were a very third rate lot". Papakura was said to have been the best back on the ground and "his thorough knowledge of the game, and his evasive abilities, make him a champion exponent of the game". The Rotorua backs were faster and handled the ball better than their opponents, particularly Lane, Harp, Rawson, and Papakura. For Auckland backs Neighbour, Wynyard, and Woodward were the pick though Woodward spoiled many opportunities by trying to do too much on his own. A notable feature of the game was the "magnificent" goal kicking of the Rotorua kickers with McCallum converting four tries and Lane two of the seven that they scored. For Auckland, Neighbour and Woodward scored their only tries with Wynyard converting Neighbours effort. Ferguson, the Auckland fullback broke his leg above the ankle during the match when his team mate S Marshall fell across it. Ferguson had to be taken to the local hospital after being seen by Dr. Endlesberger who was brought to the ground and "refused to accept payment for his services" he set the leg. The hospital also treated him free of charge. Riki Papakura who starred for Rotorua played for Auckland against Wellington. After the return of the Auckland B side their manager, E.W. Watts said "the game has made great strides in the Wonderland town, and the league there boasts of three clubs". The Auckland side had "been received by Mr. Horlick, the president, and were most hospitably entertained during their visit...". He also said that the Rotorua union would play a charity match for the benefit of Ferguson who was brought to Auckland on the Monday express train.

2 October	Rotorua	33–8	Auckland B	Rotorua
	Try: B Rawson 2, Lane 2, Harp, Anderson, Thom; Con: McCallum 4, Lane 2		Try: Frederick Neighbour, Frank Woodward; Con: Richard Wynyard	Attendance: "large crowd"

Team details

FB	1	B Rawson
WG	2	Lane
CE	3	Rukingi Reke (Joseph Rogers)
WG	4	Hill
FE	5	Morse
FE	6	Harp
HB	7	Riki Papakura (captain)
PR	8	W McCallum
HK	9	Harker
PR	10	Nikorima Ratete (Nikki Rogers)
SR	11	T Anderson
SR	12	Thom
LF	13	A Worrall
Emergency:
EM	14	C Davidson
EM	15	Clarke
EM	16	Goulter
EM	17	Vickers
EM	18	Hodge
EM	19	Judd
EM	20	Walker
Coach:

FB	1	Ferguson
WG	2	Frederick Neighbour
CE	3	Hugh Haswell
WG	4	S Marshall
FE	5	P Webb
FE	6	Richard Wynyard (captain)
HB	7	H McReynolds
PR	8	Richard Wells
HK	9	Baker
PR	10	J Percival
SR	11	Lupton
SR	12	Hopkins
LF	13	Frank Woodward
Emergency:
EM	14	Fred Gladding
Coach:
Manager: E.W. Watts

=== Auckland v Wellington ===
The Auckland team.

The Wellington team.

The crowd at Victoria Park.

Jack Stanaway breaking away for Auckland.

Wellington attacking.

Auckland captain, Richard Wynyard playing at halfback going to retrieve the ball from a scrum win.

Wellington winning a scrum with halfback Bert Frewin waiting

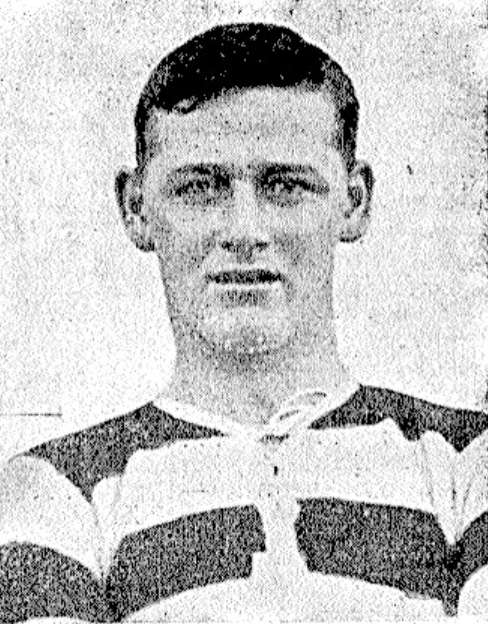
Auckland halfback Richard (Dick) Wynyard.

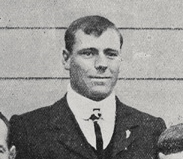
Tom Cross the Wellington prop.

Con Sullivan, the Wellington hooker.

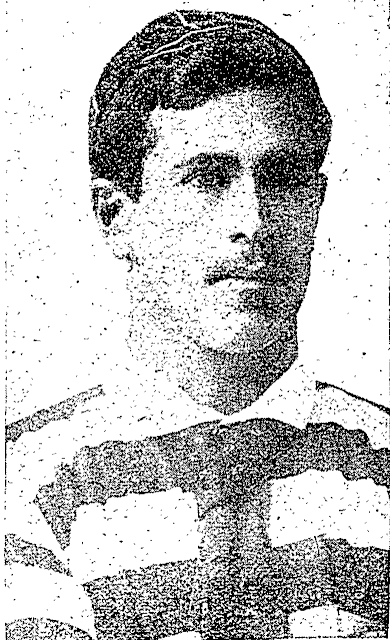
Albert Asher, the former All Black who was famous for attempting to hurdle tacklers who he did multiple times in Auckland's loss to Wellington.

On October 9 Auckland played Wellington at Victoria Park. Mr. D.G. Fraser accompanied the Wellington team as their manager who stayed at the Waitemata Hotel. It was noted that there were several original New Zealand representative players involved in the match along with others who had debuted for New Zealand on their 1908 and 1909 tours of Australia, namely William Mackrell, Charles Dunning, Bill Tyler, Dick Wynyard, Tom Cross, Hercules Wright, James Barber, Con Sullivan, and Albert House. Also featured were Albert Asher, a former All Black and future New Zealand player, Alf Chorley, who would also represent New Zealand and had played professionally for Warrington in England. The game was refereed by Sam Houghton who had played for the St. Helens club in England. The gate takings amounted to £130. The weather was described as "perfect" in "brilliant sunshine, which was only tempered by a slight breeze" from the south-west, though it was noted that the heat made it hard work for the players. Despite this "the play was of an exceptionally fast and strenuous nature, and was full of interest until time was called". Overall the play was said to have been "probably the best of the code that has been seen locally, and was wonderfully fast throughout". Auckland lost the toss and had to play east to west into the sun and slightly against the wind. The game opened fast and the Auckland forwards were getting the better of the scrums but Wynyards passes were lobbed to his five eighths and Wellington were able to attack them. Both teams had chances as the play moved up and down the field but the first points came to Wellington when Oliver Instone gained possession from a kick and made a strong run before being tackled in the corner, O'Sullivan secured the ball and scored with Barber failing to convert. From the restart the Auckland forwards, led by George Seagar took play into the Wellington 25 and Wynyard sent the ball to Alfred Jackson who moved it on to Jack Stanaway who was thrown into touch near the line. From the next play Wynyard "wriggled across b]near the corner flag but Tyler failed to convert. Immediately after James Grundy for Auckland ran down to Proebstal but was "splendidly" tackled. Asher made a "bumpy run" but was stopped and Wellington came back with Cross taking the ball from a ruck and running in to score with Barber converting to give the visitors an 8-3 lead. Auckland looked likely to score after some good work by Seagar, Riki Papakura, and Jackson, but were "cleverly stopped by [Bertie] Frewin", and then Wellington came back but Asher this time saved for Auckland. Jackson, Stanaway, Jim Griffen, and Dunning brought play to the Wellington line where Wynyard took it 5 yards from the line and passed to Seagar who scored with Tyler converting and tying the scores at 8. Auckland attacked from the resumption with several players involved but when they crossed to score it was disallowed and Wellington moved play back down the field with Murphy making "a fine run, and then he passed to Jackson (Wellington), who carried to the line and then passed to Wright" who scored. House missed the conversion but Wellington was now back in front. Riki Papakura took a return kick and attempted to hurdle over Bertie Frewin but was caught on the foot "and came down heavily" but was not hurt and came back to his feet. Wellington came back on attack and C Moir nearly scored in the corner but Chorley saved with "a splendid tackle". The ball was kicked across field and Murphy took a mark with Jackson (Wellington) kicking a "fine goal from near halfway" to give Wellington a 13-8 lead at halftime.

The second half saw the Wellington players "dazzled" by the low sun, but Auckland had no advantage from the wind which had disappeared. Within a minute Frewin passed to Moir to Wright as they raced down field and scored with Jackson missing the extra points though they now led 16-8. Tyler missed a penalty shot for Auckland and Dunning was stopped on the line before Asher tried to score from one of his characteristic hurdles over an opponent who stood up with Asher's boots landing on his shoulder and chest. Asher "escaped a dangerous landing by twisting and landing nearly on his feet". Soon after Jackson (Auckland) gained possession and passed to Seagar who sprinted 40 yards and scored next to the posts with Woodward converting. Wellington took control of the game for a period and nearly scored twice but they held them out once and then again through Asher. However they could not survive a third attack and Barber crossed though Jackson missed "as easy kick". They still however held a 6 point lead. Auckland attacked from the kick and Asher, "making a bumpy run, beat several visitors" and passed to Woodward who battled his way over but was called back "for some reason". Wellington got a free kick and took play down field and after Barber made a run he kicked over Chorley's head and into touch. From the next play Con Sullivan made a run and then Wright took the ball off his opponent Dunning and ran over unopposed between the posts unopposed though Barbers easy conversion went under the bar. Auckland went on to attack through their backs but Woodward's failure to take a pass from Papakura saw them lose a chance. They kept the pressure on and Jackson made a break then from a scrum 25 yards out Dunning ran right through the Wellington backs and scored though Woodward's conversion missed meaning Wellington still led 22-16. Dunning was obstructed after the restart and but Jackson missed the penalty attempt despite a "fine effort". Wellington attacked and House "made a fine run, beating several backs, the tackling of Auckland being miserable". However even though they seemed certain to score the Wellington backs failed to take the opportunity. Jackson (Wellington) made a strong run but Auckland was given a free kick and relieved. Asher then made a "strong bumping run, and then play worked to the other wing, and Stanaway carried it downfield a considerable distance". Dunning moved it further forward and then Grundy kicked it over the line and fell on it. Tyler's kicked missed but Auckland was now only down 22-19. The last few minutes were exciting with Auckland having a chance to draw or win but they could not cross and Wellington secured what was to be a rare win in Auckland.

9 October	Auckland Province	19–22 (8-13)	Wellington	Victoria Park
3:00	Try: Richard Wynyard, Charles Dunning, George Seagar 2, James Grundy; Con: William Tyler 1/3, Frank Woodward 1/2; Pen: Alfred Jackson 0/1		Try: James Barber, Tom Cross, Hercules Wright 3, O'Sullivan; Con: James Barber 1/3, Albert House 0/1, Jackson 0/1; Pen: Jackson 1/1 (mark)	Attendance: 4,000; Referee: Sam Houghton

Team details

FB	1	Alf Chorley
WG	2	Frank Woodward
CE	3	Albert Asher
WG	4	Jack Stanaway
FE	5	Riki Papakura
FE	6	Richard Wynyard
HB	7	Alfred Jackson
PR	8	William Mackrell
HK	9	Jim Griffen
PR	10	Charles Dunning
SR	11	William Tyler
SR	12	James Grundy
LF	13	George Seagar
Emergency: Smith
Emergency: Dick Bradburn
Emergency: William Winter

FB	1	Murphy
WG	2	Oliver Instone
CE	3	C Moir
WG	4	Albert House
FE	5	Roy Proebstal
FE	6	James Barber
HB	7	Bert Frewin
PR	8	Tom Cross
HK	9	Con Sullivan
PR	10	Hercules Wright
SR	11	Henry Knight
SR	12	Jackson
LF	13	O'Sullivan
Coach:

=== Auckland representative matches played and scorers ===
The following list includes the four legitimate representative matches against New Zealand Maori, Taranaki (two matches), and Wellington. The Rotorua match is omitted as it was an Auckland Junior/Auckland XIII selection. James Grundy switched from the Ponsonby rugby club at the end of the season and made one appearance for Auckland. It appears that he did not play either code in the following season.

Rank	Name	Club	Play	Tries	Con	Pen	Mark	Drop	Points
1	Richard (Dick) Bradburn	Newton	1	-	4/4	1/1	1/1	-	12
2	Frank Woodward	North Shore	4	2	2/3	-	-	0/1	10
3	Charles Dunning	Ponsonby	3	3	-	-	-	-	9
4	Richard Wynyard	North Shore	4	2	-	-	-	-	6
4	George Seagar	North Shore	3	2	-	-	-	-	6
4	Bill Tyler	Ponsonby	3	-	3/6	-	-	-	6
4	Charles Linkhorn	City	2	2	-	-	-	-	6
8	Jim Griffin	North Shore	4	1	-	-	-	-	3
8	William Mackrell	Newton	3	1	-	-	-	-	3
8	Arthur Carlaw	Ponsonby	2	1	-	-	-	-	3
8	James Grundy	none	1	1	-	-	-	-	3
8	Thomas Houghton	Newton	1	1	-	-	-	-	3
13	Frederick Neighbour	North Shore	3	-	0/1	-	1/1	-	2
13	S Marshall	North Shore	1	-	1/2	-	0/1	-	2
15	Alfred Jackson	North Shore	3	-	-	0/1	-	-	0
15	Richard (Dick) Wells	North Shore	3	-	-	-	-	-	0
15	Albert Asher	City	2	-	-	-	-	-	0
15	Alf Chorley	City & Newton	2	-	-	-	-	-	0
15	Jack Stanaway	Ponsonby	2	-	-	-	-	-	0
15	Sam Houghton	Newton	1	-	-	-	-	-	0
15	Ronald MacDonald	North Shore	1	-	-	-	-	-	0
15	Riki Papakura	Rotorua	1	-	-	-	-	-	0
15	George Smith	City	1	-	-	-	-	-	0
15	William Wynyard	North Shore	1	-	-	-	-	-	0
TOTAL	All Players	-	52	16	10/16	1/2	2/3	0/1	74

== Club and Exhibition Matches ==
=== North Shore Albions v City Rovers ===
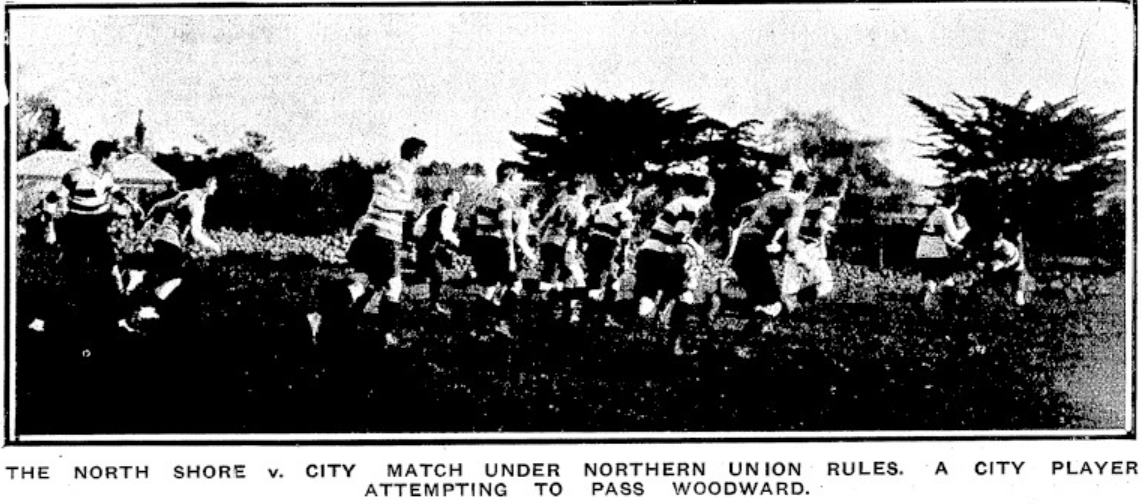

A photograph of the first ever club rugby league match was published in the New Zealand Illustrated Sporting and Dramatic Review publication on August 5. Frank Woodward is seen bending to tackle an on rushing player. It was played at R. Eagleton's Paddock in Epsom which was close to Alexandra Park. The paddock was located near the south west portion of the intersection of Manukau Road and Greenlane West Road. William Wynyard was the captain of the North Shore side and both he and his brother Richard were the teams coaches. Alfred Jackson played for North Shore and would go on to represent Auckland 23 times and New Zealand 3 times.

24 July	North Shore Albions	44–24	City Rovers	R Eagleton's Paddock, Epsom
	Try: B Wells 2, Frederick Neighbour, J Percival 2, Fred Gladding 2, George Seagar 3 Con: Frank Woodward 7		Try: Arthur Carlaw, William Tyler, Charles Linkhorn 2, Len Farrant, Smith; Con: Thomas Houghton, Len Farrant 2	Referee: Matt Hooper

=== North Shore Albions v Combined Town ===
14 August	North Shore	26-10	Combined Town	North Shore Cricket Ground
3:00	Try: Unknown		Try: Unknown

=== Ponsonby United v Newton Rangers (14 August) ===
Jack Stanaway (Hone Haira) coached the sides. There was no scoring published for the match as it was considered a practice game. It was reported that F. Lynch, W. Tobin, and Matthews played well in the backs for Ponsonby, with B. Kean, Warner, and Oakley playing well in the forwards. In the Newton side Will Tobin, and Haswell in the backs, and Oliver, Cole, and Curtis were "conspicuous" in the forwards.

14 August	Ponsonby United	21-16	Newton Rangers	Victoria Park
3:00				Attendance: 100; Referee: Matt Hooper

=== Ponsonby United v Newton Rangers (21 August) ===
21 August	Ponsonby United	16-6	Newton Rangers	Victoria Park
3:00				Attendance: 400

=== Newton Rangers v North Shore Albions ===
4 September	Newton Rangers	17–16	North Shore Albions	Victoria Park
3:00	Try: Alf Chorley, William Mackrell 2 Con: Dick Bradburn 3 Pen: Dick Bradburn		Try: Jim Griffen, Williams 2, McReynolds; Con: S Marshall; Pen: Frederick Neighbour

=== Junior matches ===
List of Additional Exhibition Matches
	Date		Score		Score	Venue	Attendance	Scorers
Junior match	31 July	North Shore Juniors	20	Auckland Juniors	8	Victoria Park	-	
Junior match	7 Aug	City Juniors	2	North Shore Juniors	0	Victoria Park	-	Penalty by Marshall
