= George Seagar =

NZ international rugby league footballer

Personal information
- Full name: George Bradley Seagar
- Born: 6 May 1888 Auckland, New Zealand
- Died: 30 June 1968 (aged 80) Wellington, New Zealand

Playing information
- Height: 181.5 cm (5 ft 11.5 in)
- Weight: 72 kg (11 st 5 lb)
- Position: Fullback, Loose forward
Club
| Years | Team | Pld | T | G | FG | P |
|---|---|---|---|---|---|---|
| 1909–20 | North Shore | 63 | 19 | 13 | 0 | 83 |
| 1910 | Combined Clubs | 1 | 1 | 0 | 0 | 3 |
| 1917 | Combined (City, Newton, & N Shore) | 1 | 1 | 0 | 0 | 3 |
| | Total | 65 | 21 | 13 | 0 | 89 |
Representative
| Years | Team | Pld | T | G | FG | P |
| 1909–14 | Auckland | 31 | 18 | 8 | 2 | 74 |
| 1910–11 | New Zealand | 8 | 3 | 13 | 0 | 35 |
- Relatives: Allan Seagar (brother)

George Seagar (6 May 1888 – 30 June 1968) was a New Zealand rugby league footballer who represented New Zealand. His younger brother Allan Seagar also represented New Zealand at rugby league.

== Rugby league playing career, boxing, and rowing ==
George Seagar was a boiler maker by trade, living in Devonport on Auckland's North Shore. Seagar was one of the first rugby league footballers in New Zealand, representing Auckland against Taranaki in 1909.

In 1909, he joined the North Shore Albions club as a founding player and also served on the Auckland Rugby League's management committee. He went on to play 63 games from 1909 to 1920 punctuated by his time away in the First World War. He scored 19 tries and kicked 13 goals for North Shore and was known for his size and pace.

Seagar played for both Auckland and New Zealand against the touring Great Britain Lions.

Seagar posing in boxing attire in 1909.

In 1910 Seagar toured with the Auckland representative side on their first ever tour of New Zealand. He played in most of the matches as a loose forward. In their second tour match against Bluff he scored four tries. That same evening the 10st 7lb Seagar competed in the annual September boxing tournament at the Municipal Theatre and beat J. O'Shea of Invercargill (11st 4lbs) with loud applause from many of his teammates who were in attendance. He then beat F. Moir (10st 8lbs) of Winton in three rounds in the welter weight section winning all three rounds. The following day he played for Auckland again against Southland and scored another try. Unfortunately he injured his arm and was unable to compete in that night's boxing.

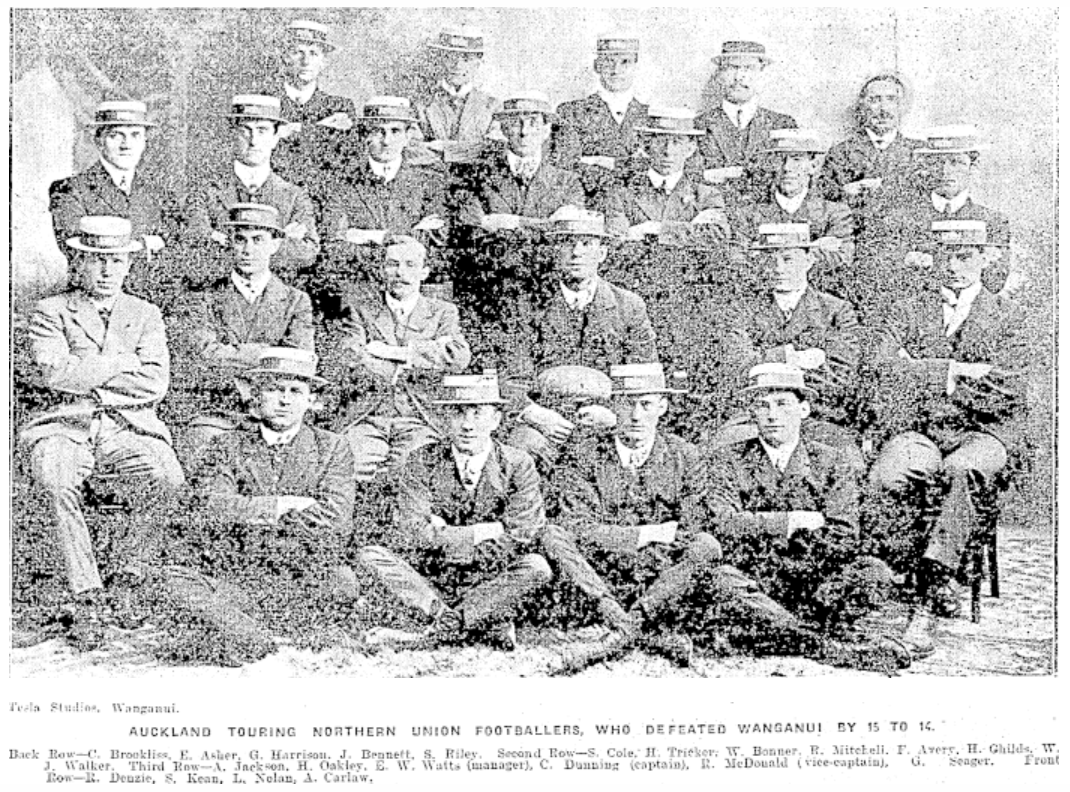

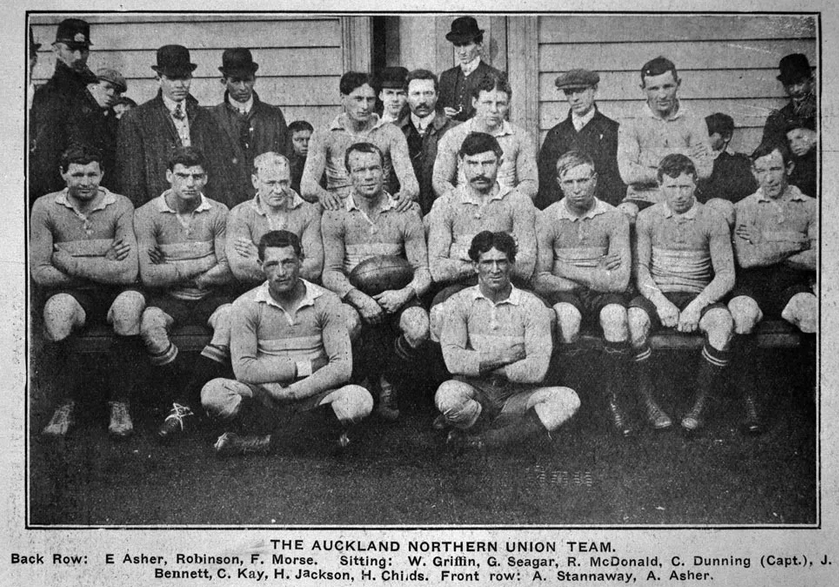
Seagar in the Auckland side to play Wellington on August 5, 1911.

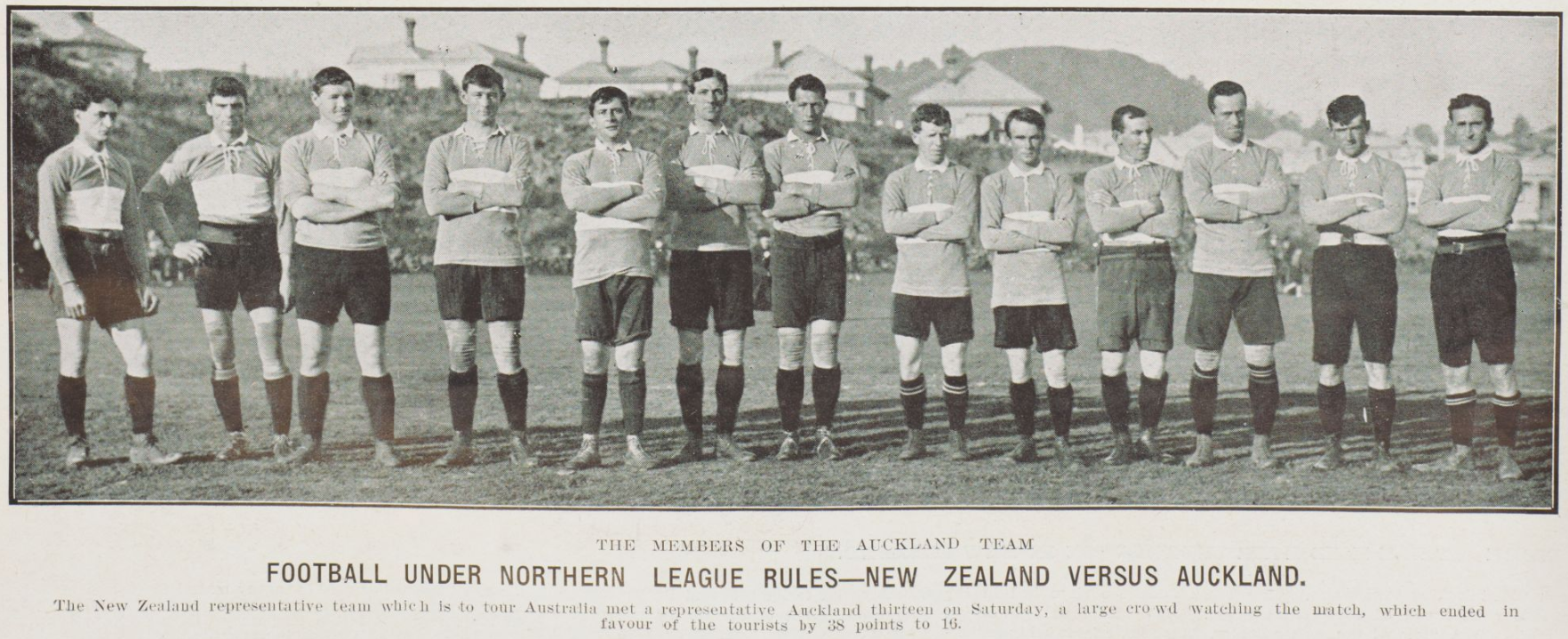
Seagar second from the left in the 1912 Auckland rugby league side to play New Zealand at Eden Park.

He again represented New Zealand in 1911, being part of the tour of Australia, although no test matches were played on tour.

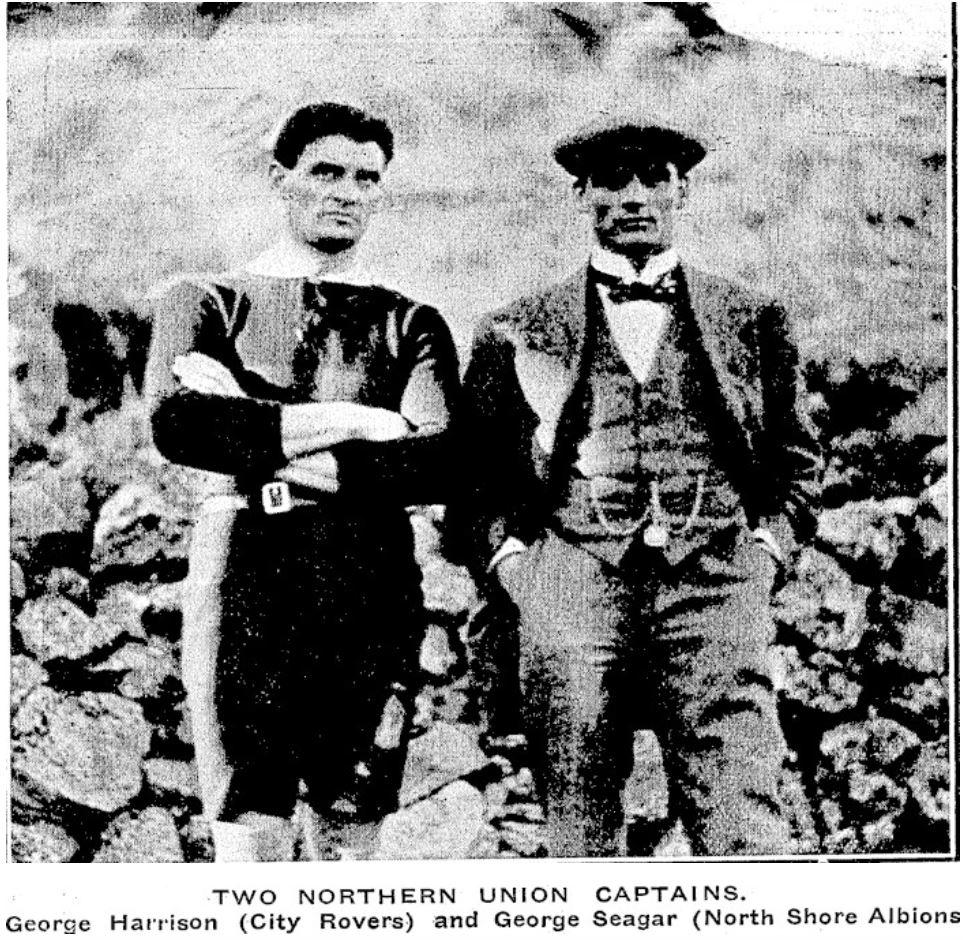
George Seagar on the right, next to Auckland team mate George Harrison in 1912.

By 1912, Seagar was the captain of North Shore Albions and he again represented Auckland. He did return to Auckland after the war and resumed his career with North Shore playing for them until 1920.

Seagar was also a well known member of the North Shore Rowing club.

His brother Allan Wilfred Seagar would also play for North Shore in the 1920s and 30s and he represented New Zealand in 1930.

== World War I ==
Seagar photographed by Herman John Schmidt in 1914 when he joined the war effort.

Like many other players of the time his sporting career was either cut short or punctuated by the war. He enlisted in the army and embarked on the Waimana on October 16, 1914, to join the war effort as a corporal, landing at Suez, Egypt. He was part of the Divisional Train, A.S.C., Main Body. He was promoted to sergeant and returned to New Zealand onboard the steamer Willochra early in 1916 after being admitted to hospital on August 8, 1915, suffering from dysentery. Seagar was discharged from service on April 12, 1916, and later awarded the British War Medal and the Victory Medal.
