= Lance Todd =

New Zealand rugby league coach and former international

- Cope's Cigarette card featuring Lance Todd

Personal information
- Full name: Lancelot Beaumont Todd
- Born: 26 May 1883 Auckland, New Zealand
- Died: 14 November 1942 (aged 59) Oldham, England

Playing information
- Height: 170 cm (5 ft 7 in)
- Weight: 63.5 kg (10 st 0 lb)

Rugby union
- Position: First five-eighth
Club
Years	Team	Pld	T	G	FG	P
1903–04	Suburbs	10	1	0	0	3
1905–06	City	11	3	20	0	49
1906–07	Parnell	16	2	12	0	35
1906	City Odd Fellows	1	1	3	0	11
1907	Combined Club XV	1	0	0	0	0
	Total	39	7	35	0	98
Representative
Years	Team	Pld	T	G	FG	P
1905–07	Auckland Trial	3	0	3	0	8
1905–06	Auckland inter-union	4	1	0	0	3
1905	Auckland	5	1	3	0	10
1906–07	Auckland B	3	1	1	0	5

Rugby league
- Position: Centre
Club
Years	Team	Pld	T	G	FG	P
1908–13	Wigan	185	126	7	0	392
1913–14	Dewsbury	10	3	0	0	9
	Total	195	129	7	0	401
Representative
Years	Team	Pld	T	G	FG	P
1907–08	New Zealand	24 (4)	13 (1)	0	0	39 (3)
1910	Lancashire	2	2	2	0	10

Coaching information
Club
Years	Team	Gms	W	D	L	W%
1928–40	Salford	525	364	32	128	69

Lancelot Beaumont "Lance" Todd (26 May 1883 – 14 November 1942) was a New Zealand-born rugby league footballer and manager of the early 20th century. As a player, he represented New Zealand in 1907 and 1908 and played in England for the Wigan and Dewsbury clubs. He later became the manager at Salford and led the club to three League Championships and one Challenge Cup victory.

== Early life ==
Todd attended Kings College which at that time was based in Remuera, Auckland, before later relocating to Ōtāhuhu. After leaving school Todd became a tailor by trade. His father was John Todd who was a well known sporting identity in the Ōtāhuhu area, particularly in horse racing. At the time of his death in October, 1920 he was the vice president of the Otahuhu Trotting Club.

== Rugby in New Zealand ==
Originally he played rugby union in the Ōtāhuhu area, with his senior debut being for the Suburbs club. They were a side made up of players who lived outside a 10-mile radius of the city centre and struggled to practice for obvious reasons. They did often train in Otahuhu however. Todd joined the City club in 1905 and then moved to the Parnell club in 1906. He first made the Auckland side in 1905, making his debut against Hawke's Bay on 12 August where he scored a try and kicked 2 conversions in their win. In 1906 despite joining the Parnell club he went on the 4 match City tour of Sydney where he played in 3 matches against Sydney University, Glebe, and South Sydney. Later in the year he played in a match for City Oddfellows (Manchester Unity town Oddfellows) against Goldfield Oddfellows. Todd was a member of the Franklin Lodge along with his brothers.

He did not make the All Blacks but this was due to the tremendous talent in front of him and he was still regarded as being a special player in the Auckland scene. He made his debut for Auckland in 1905, playing in 4 matches. Despite playing in several trial matches he did not play for Auckland again in 1906 or 1907, but did play in an inter-union match in 1906 and 3 Auckland B games over the 1906-07 period.

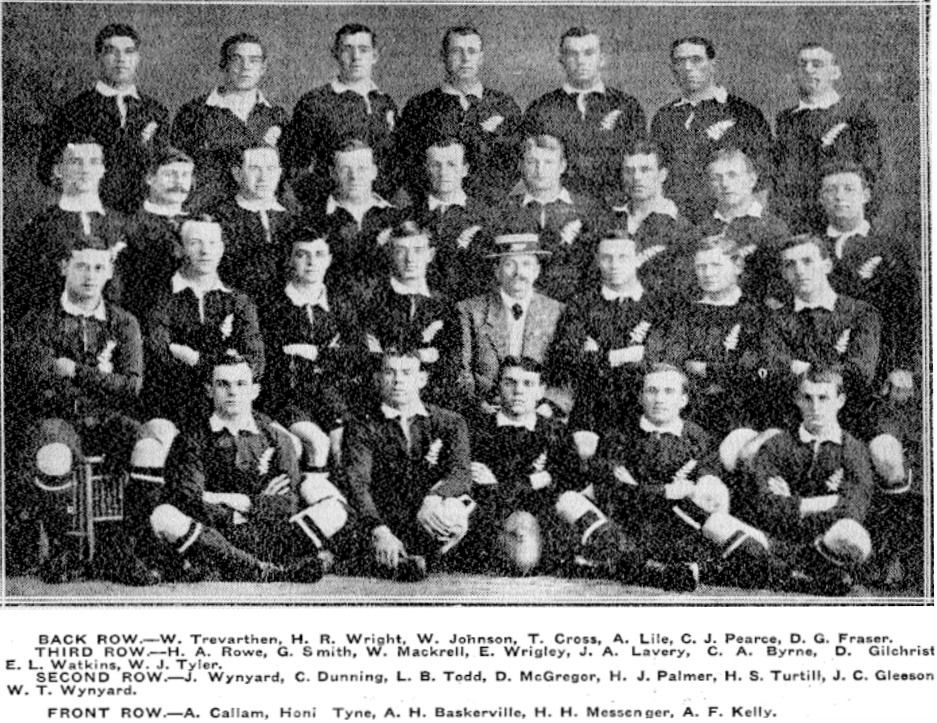
New Zealand Rugby League Team of 1907–08 to Tour Great Britain

He was picked for the professional All Blacks 1907–1908 rugby tour of Great Britain and Australia and subsequently, like all members of the tour, received a life ban from the New Zealand Rugby Union. Todd had been involved in organising the tour and served on the Management Committee. During the tour he excelled at the game of rugby league, playing in four Test matches, and scoring eight tries in all games. He was one of five players who opted to stay in Great Britain at the tour's end.

== Rugby League in England ==
He was signed by Wigan after the tour for £400 and the captaincy, and he became an outstanding centre, making 186 appearances for the club. He was later joined by fellow tourist Massa Johnston and All Black Charlie Seeling.

Lance Todd played at centre in Wigan's 10–9 victory over Oldham in the 1908 Lancashire Cup Final during the 1908–09 season at Wheater's Field, Broughton, on Saturday 19 December 1908, and played at centre and scored a try in the 21–5 victory over Rochdale Hornets in the 1912 Lancashire Cup Final during the 1912–13 season at Weaste, Salford, on Wednesday 11 December 1912.

At the end of the 1908–09 Northern Rugby Football Union season Todd played at centre in Wigan's victory over Oldham in the Championship Final. He was also a member of the first Wigan Rugby League Challenge Cup Final line-up, which they lost to Broughton Rangers in 1911.

The Auckland Rugby League was recognised by England's Northern Rugby Football Union as New Zealand's governing body for the game of rugby league, with Lance Todd to act as their delegate in England. In 1909 he refereed Auckland's first ever official match with Taranaki on 9 August at Victoria Park. Five weeks later he refereed the return match at the Recreation Ground in New Plymouth.

During November 1910, he played twice for Lancashire, when his aggregate of two tries and two goals helped seal the county title. In 1914, he transferred, unexpectedly, to Dewsbury for a fee of £450 – a huge fee at the time, (based on increases in average earnings, this would be approximately £139,900 in 2013). He left Dewsbury during the First World War to serve with the ANZACs.

== Later life ==
In 1928 he became the team manager at Salford, achieving legendary status. Salford were close to folding when he joined but his management turned them into a formidable and successful team. During the 1930s Salford won three League Championships, five Lancashire League Championships, four Lancashire Cups, and was the coach in Salford's 7–4 victory over Barrow in the 1938 Challenge Cup Final during the 1937–38 season at Wembley Stadium, London, in front of a crowd of 51,243.. He stayed at Salford until August 1940 when club directors decided not to renew his contract whilst the country was at war with Germany.

In 1933, as well his work at Salford, he became the Rugby League commentator for BBC Radio. "Mr Lance B. Todd presents running commentary on....." the rugby league game of the day was very common in the Radio listings during the 1930s.

== Personal life and death ==
Lance Todd married Amy B. Samuels on 7 May 1911 at the Wigan Parish Church. Her father was Charles Samuels who was deceased prior to the wedding. Charles and had been licensee of the Crofters Arms Hotel, and had been a well known rugby player and a famous sprinter when younger. They had a daughter, Patricia Elaine Todd in 1922 who died in 2004.

Later in his life he managed the Silver Grid in King Street and the Ship Hotel in Millgate prior to his appointment as manager of Salford.

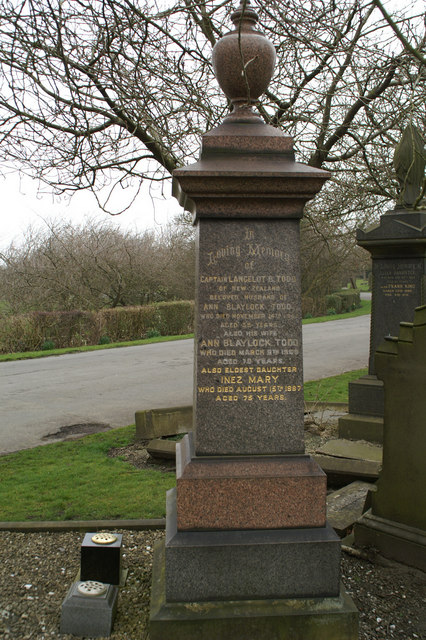
Lance Todd's Gravestone

Todd died in a motor accident on 14 November 1942. An inquest into his death determined a verdict of "accidental death". During World War II Todd was serving as a commandant to the Salford section of the Home Guard but it would be on a return home from duty in Oldham that the accident happened. A car he was driving swerved to avoid a collision with a tram, but crashed into a lamppost. Todd died along with his colleague Colonel Frank Sewell in the front passenger seat. Two passengers in the rear seats of the car survived. Todd is buried in Wigan (Ince) cemetery.

== Legacy ==
His work as a manager and as a radio commentator resulted in the Lance Todd Trophy being named after him. This trophy is awarded to the man of the match in the Challenge Cup Final.

In 2007 Todd was inducted as one of the New Zealand Rugby League's inaugural "Legends of League".
