= William Mackrell =

NZ dual-code international rugby footballer

Bill Mackrell
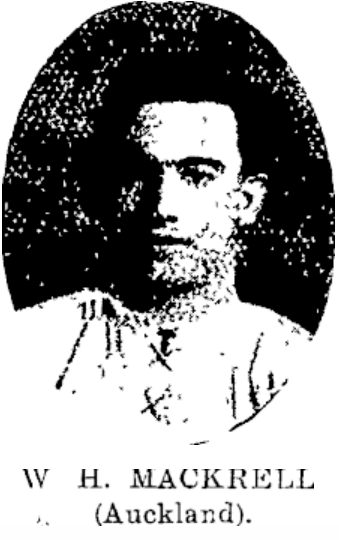

Personal information
- Full name: William Henry Clifton Mackrell
- Born: 20 July 1881 Milton, New South Wales, Australia
- Died: 15 July 1917 (aged 35) Auckland, Auckland Region, New Zealand

Playing information
- Height: 178 cm (5 ft 10 in)
- Weight: 79 kg (12 st 6 lb)

Rugby union
- Position: Hooker, Back row
Club
Years	Team	Pld	T	G	FG	P
1904–05	Newton
1906	City
	Total	0	0	0	0	0
Representative
Years	Team	Pld	T	G	FG	P
1904–06	Auckland (other)	6	0	0	0	0
1904–05	Auckland	4	0	0	0	0
1905	North Island	1	0	0	0	0
1906	New Zealand	7	1	0	0	3

Rugby league
- Position: Hooker, Second-row
Club
Years	Team	Pld	T	G	FG	P
1909–12	Newton Rangers	21	4	0	0	12
Representative
Years	Team	Pld	T	G	FG	P
1907–08	New Zealand	17	1	0	0	3
1908–10	Auckland	7	1	0	0	3

William Henry Clifton Mackrell (20 July 1881 – 15 July 1917) was a New Zealand rugby footballer who represented New Zealand in both rugby union and rugby league. He was part of the 1905 The Original All Blacks tour and the professional 1907-1908 New Zealand rugby tour of Great Britain.

== Early years ==
Mackrell was a printer by trade.

== Rugby football ==
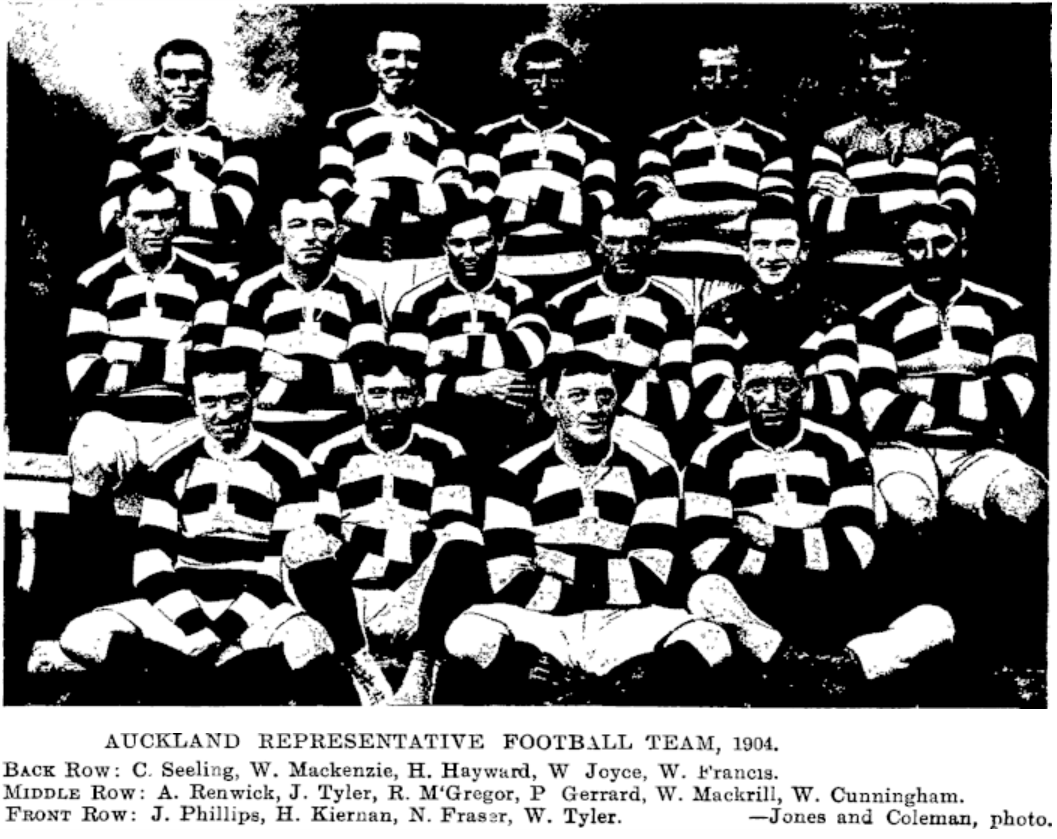

Mackrell began playing rugby union for the City club. He represented Auckland between 1901 and 1905 and earned North Island selection in 1905. His last first class rugby union match in New Zealand was for Auckland against the All Blacks in 1905 as they prepared for a short tour of Australia.

Mackrell was then selected to be part of The Original All Blacks 1905 tour of Great Britain and France but injury hampered his tour and he played in only one test match, against France in Paris on New Years Day, 1906. On his return he was replaced in the Auckland side by Charlie Dunning.

== Rugby league ==
Mackrell, along with Newton team mates Harold Rowe and William Trevarthan, was selected for the professional All Blacks in their 1907-1908 tour of Great Britain and Australia. As a result, he received a life ban from the New Zealand Rugby Union. He played in two test matches on the tour, including the first ever rugby league test match against Wales on New Years Day, 1908. He played in the first ever trans-Tasman test which was the debut match of the Australia national rugby league team.

When he returned to New Zealand, Mackrell was involved in establishing the Newton Rangers rugby league club. He also played in the first ever provincial game of rugby league in New Zealand, helping Auckland defeat Wellington 16-14 on 24 August 1908.

In 1911 Mackrell again played for New Zealand in an exhibition match against Auckland. Mackrell received a kick to the head in a 1912 match which forced his retirement and may have also led to his early death.

Mackrell died in Auckland on 15 July 1917 as a result of a paralytic seizure, five days before his 36th birthday and was buried at Waikaraka Cemetery in Onehunga (Area 2, Block N, Plot 085A).
