= James Carlaw =

New Zealand rugby league administrator

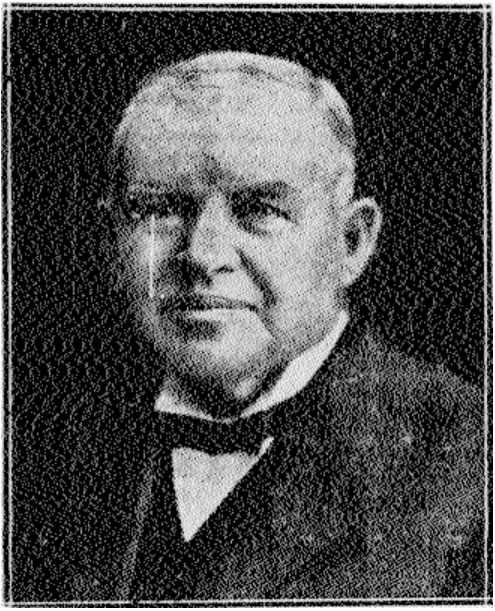
- Born: 1853; Newcastle-upon-Tyne, England
- Died: 22 May 1935 (aged 81); Mount Eden, Auckland, New Zealand
- Occupation: Waterworks engineer
- Known for: President of the New Zealand Rugby League
- Relatives: Arthur Carlaw (nephew)

James Carlaw was a New Zealand rugby league administrator. He is the namesake of Carlaw Park in Auckland, and was the uncle of international player Arthur Carlaw.

== Early years ==
Carlaw was born near Newcastle-upon-Tyne in 1853. His family emigrated to New Zealand when he was nine.

Carlaw worked as a waterworks engineer, spending forty six years with the Auckland City Council.

== Administration career ==
Like his nephew, Carlaw was involved in the formation of the Ponsonby United club in 1908 and on 30 July 1909 he was elected the club's first Chairman.

Carlaw served as the President of the New Zealand Rugby League between 1914 and 1919. As Ponsonby's representative on the Auckland Rugby League board, Carlaw was chairman of the board between 1918 and 1920. While in this position he started the negotiations that resulted in the league's acquisition of a Chinese market garden that was transformed into Carlaw Park. The opening, on 21 June 1921, was the result of three years of negotiations between the committee led by Carlaw and the Auckland Hospital Board who owned the land.

Between 1926 and 1928 Carlaw again served as the President of the New Zealand Rugby League.

In 1928 he was elected Auckland Rugby League President and served in this role until 1935.

== Death ==
Carlaw died on 22 May 1935, aged 81, at his residence in Herbert Road, Mount Eden.
