= Frank Woodward (rugby league) =

New Zealand international rugby league footballer

Personal information
- Full name: Francis William Woodward
- Born: 20 April 1885
- Died: 14 September 1941 (aged 56)

Playing information
- Position: Centre, Stand-off
Club
Years	Team	Pld	T	G	FG	P
1909	North Shore (ARL)	2	0	7	0	14
1910	Balmain	9	0	0	0	0
1911–12	Tukapa (Rotorua)
	Total	11	0	7	0	14
Representative
Years	Team	Pld	T	G	FG	P
1909–13	Auckland	6	2	2	0	10
1910–11	New Zealand	8 (1)	4	1	0	14
1910	Rotorua	2	3	0	0	9
1911–12	Australia	6	1	0	0	3

Francis "Frank" William Woodward (1885−1941) was a New Zealand professional rugby league footballer who played in the 1900s and 1910s. He played at representative level for New Zealand, Australasia, Auckland and Rotorua, and at club level for Balmain, as a centre or stand-off.

In June 1910, he captained Rotorua in their match against Auckland at Victoria Park.

== International honours ==
Frank Woodward won a cap for New Zealand during the 1910 Great Britain Lions tour of Australia and New Zealand, playing Stand-off in the 20-52 defeat by Great Britain at Domain Cricket Ground, Auckland on Saturday 30 July 1910. He also represented New Zealand in 1911 on the tour of Australia, and Australasia on the 1911–12 Kangaroo tour of Great Britain.
