= Alf Chorley =

New Zealand international rugby league footballer

Personal information
- Full name: Alfred Chorley
- Born: 14 June 1874 Kendal, Westmorland, England
- Died: 14 September 1960 (aged 86) Auckland, New Zealand

Playing information
- Height: 165 cm (5 ft 5 in)
- Weight: 70 kg (11 st 0 lb)
- Position: Fullback
Club
| Years | Team | Pld | T | G | FG | P |
|---|---|---|---|---|---|---|
| 1895–98 | Halifax | 71 | 3 | 4 | 1 | 14 |
| 1899–04 | Swinton | 122 | 3 | 5 | 0 | 19 |
| 1909 | Combined Town (AKL RL) | 1 | 0 | 0 | 0 | 0 |
| 1909 | City Rovers | 1 | 0 | 0 | 0 | 0 |
| 1909 | Newton Rangers | 1 | 1 | 0 | 0 | 3 |
| 1910–12 | Ponsonby United | 11 | 1 | 1 | 0 | 5 |
| | Total | 207 | 8 | 10 | 1 | 41 |
Representative
| Years | Team | Pld | T | G | FG | P |
| 1908–11 | Auckland | 8 | 1 | 0 | 0 | 3 |
| 1910 | New Zealand | 1 | 0 | 0 | 0 | 0 |

Alfred Chorley was an English-born rugby league footballer who represented New Zealand.

== Playing career ==
Alf Chorley playing for Auckland against Hawke's Bay on August 19, 1911 at Victoria Park in Auckland.

Chorley played for Halifax, and Swinton before moving to New Zealand.

Chorley was involved with the early years of rugby league in Auckland, playing for Auckland in 1908 and competing for City in the first match sanctioned by the Auckland Rugby League in 1909.

Chorley played a Test match for New Zealand in 1910 against the touring Great Britain Lions. Aged 36 years and 46 days old at the time, Chorley still holds the record as the oldest Kiwi.

== World War I and personal life ==
Alfred Chorley married Elizabeth Chorley in Wakefield, England, on 16 September 1897. At the time of his enlistment in the army in World War I, they were living at 72 Khyber Pass Road in Auckland. Chorley stated that his occupation was a "motorman" on his enlistment form. Chorley's war service commenced on 27 June 1916 and he was discharged on 21 January 1919, being judged 'over age to serve any longer'. By this point he would have been 44 and a half years old.
