= Riki Papakura =

New Zealand rugby league footballer

Personal information
- Born: New Zealand
- Height: 178 cm (5 ft 10 in)
- Weight: 70 kg (11 st 0 lb)

Playing information
- Position: Fullback, Centre
Club
Years	Team	Pld	T	G	FG	P
	Unknown (Rotorua)
1911	Warrington	1	0	0	0	0
	Total	1	0	0	0	0
Representative
Years	Team	Pld	T	G	FG	P
1908–09	New Zealand Māori	20	5	2	0	19
1909	Rotorua	1	0	0	0	0
1909	Auckland	1	0	0	0	0
1910	Australasia	2	0	0	0	0

Riki "Dick" Papakura was a New Zealand rugby league player who represented the New Zealand Māori side and Australasia and played professionally for Warrington. His position of preference was at fullback or in the centres.

== Playing career ==
From Rotorua, Papakura toured Australia twice with the New Zealand Māori side; in 1908 with the original touring party and again as captain of the 1909 New Zealand Māori side, he also represented Australasia.

In 1909 Papakura played for Rotorua against an Auckland XIII before playing for Auckland against Wellington.

In 1910 Papakura was one of three New Zealanders invited to Sydney to represent Australasia against the touring Great Britain Lions, alongside Albert Asher and Con Sullivan. Papakura played in both "Test" matches at fullback.

In 1911 Papakura travelled to England to attend the Festival of Empire. He was recommended to Warrington by 1910 Lion Frank Shugars and 1908 All Gold Massa Johnston and joined the club in September. He twice appeared for Warrington A but gave the impression of being overweight and unfit.

Papakura played centre for Warrington's first grade team on 14 October 1911 in a 13–8 win over Broughton Rangers at Wilderspool Stadium. This match was part of the 1911–12 Northern Rugby Football Union season. Papakura was New Zealand's first overseas transfer, as he was granted a clearance by the New Zealand Rugby League on 6 October and Warrington paid a 20-pound fee that was forwarded to the Rotorua sub-league.

After his one and only first grade appearance, Papakura was again named in the Warrington A side. However, he realised he had failed to secure a place in the Warrington first grade team and so he returned to the Festival of Empire in London.
