= Bert King (rugby league) =

New Zealand international rugby league footballer

Personal information
- Full name: Albert Gordon King
- Born: c.1870 New Zealand
- Died: 1967 (aged 96–97)

Playing information

Rugby union
Representative
Years	Team	Pld	T	G	FG	P
190?	Wellington

Rugby league
- Position: Prop
Representative
Years	Team	Pld	T	G	FG	P
1908–1912	Wellington	1	0	0	0	0
1909	New Zealand	3	3	0	0	9

Bert King was a New Zealand rugby league footballer who represented New Zealand in 1909.

== Playing career ==
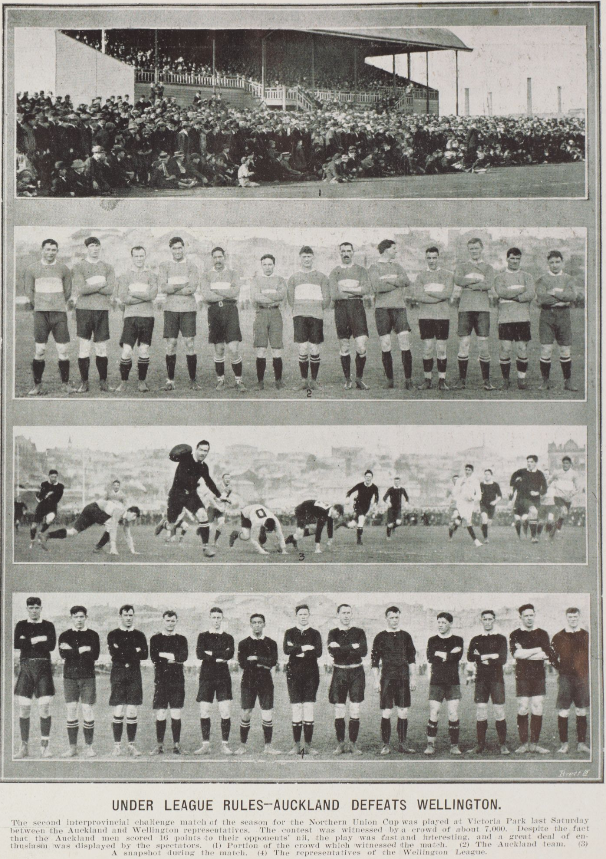
King in the Wellington side to play Auckland at Victoria Park in 1912.

King made his debut for Wellington in Game Two between Wellington and Auckland during the inaugural 1908 rugby league season in New Zealand.

In 1909 he was selected as part of the New Zealand tour of Australia. On tour, King played in all three test matches against Australia.
