= William Trevarthen =

NZ international rugby league & union footballer

Personal information
- Full name: William Macvay Trevarthen
- Born: 16 September 1878 Thames, New Zealand
- Died: 11 July 1927 (aged 48) Huddersfield, England

Playing information
- Height: 5 ft 10 in (1.78 m)
- Weight: 13 st 0 lb (83 kg)

Rugby union
- Position: Prop, Hooker, Back row
Club
Years	Team	Pld	T	G	FG	P
1898–99	Paeroa	8	0	0	0	0
1899–01	Ohinemuri Rifle Volunteers (exhibition)	2	0	0	0	0
1899	Ohinemuri (dist. rep)	3	0	0	0	0
1899	Upper Thames (sub union)	1	0	0	0	0
1901	Grafton (ARU)	5	0	0	0	0
1903–07	Newton (ARU)	47	2	1	0	8
	Total	66	2	1	0	8
Representative
Years	Team	Pld	T	G	FG	P
1904–07	Auckland	9	0	0	0	0
1904–07	Auckland (inter union team)	11	0	0	0	0
1904–07	Auckland Trials	4	1	0	0	3
1906	Auckland B	1	0	0	0	0

Rugby league
- Position: Forward
Club
Years	Team	Pld	T	G	FG	P
1909–12	Huddersfield	52	1	0	0	3
Representative
Years	Team	Pld	T	G	FG	P
1907–09	New Zealand	36 (9)	4	0	0	12
1908	Auckland	4	0	0	0	0
- Relatives: David Trevathan (cousin); Thomas Trevarthan (cousin)

William MacVay Trevarthen was a New Zealand rugby footballer who was part of the professional 1907-1908 New Zealand rugby tour of Great Britain. A relative of his, Thomas Trevarthan, later played for New Zealand in the 1930s.

== Early years ==
Trevarthen was born on September 16, 1878, to Margaret Elizabeth Trevarthen and Thomas Trevarthen. He had 9 siblings (Margaret, Henry, Mary, Ellen, William Alexander, Thomas, Rowena, Douglas, and Ernest, and 2 half siblings (Charlotte, and Agnes). William worked as a strapping clerk. He married Sophia Kaye, and had also been married to Isabella Morris who he had a daughter with named Irene Trevarthen Morris. He originally played rugby union for Paeroa and Ohinemuri sub union side in 1898-99 before going to fight in the Boer War.

== Boer War ==
Trevarthen was a part of the Ohinemuri Rifle Volunteers and played a rugby match for them in 1908 at the start of the season against Paeroa. He then enlisted in the forces to go to South Africa to fight in the Boer War. At the time of embarking his occupation was recorded as a baker. He left for the war on January 20, 1900. After returning from the war he played a preseason match for Ohinemuri Rifle Volunteers before moving to Auckland and joining the Grafton club.

== Rugby career and return to Boer War ==
In 1901 after moving to Auckland he was embroiled in controversy. The City club protested a match where he and Renwick playing saying that they were not resident in the Auckland district for 4 weeks prior to playing for Grafton. Renwick was cleared but it turned out that Trevarthen had only been in the district since May 15 when he had returned from the war. The Auckland Rugby Union had initially banned the players for life though this was later revoked. Though not before he had gone back to the war in 1902. After he returned several clubs moved to have the disqualifications removed. He then joined the Newton club for the 1903 season.

Trevarthen won Auckland selection between 1904 and 1907.

== Rugby league career ==
In 1907 Trevarthen was selected to be a part of the professional All Blacks tour of Australia and Great Britain, as a forward. Like all players this meant that Trevarthen received a life ban from the New Zealand Rugby Union. Trevarthen played in the first ever trans-Tasman test which was the début match of the Australia national rugby league team. He had played in all six tests on the tour against Great Britain and Australia and scored one try.

Trevarthen was later part of the 1909 side that toured Australia. Overall, he played in nine tests for New Zealand between 1907 and 1909.

Trevarthen then accepted a contract to go join Huddersfield alongside New Zealanders Edgar Wrigley and Conrad Byrne.
