= Ernie Buckland =

New Zealand international rugby league footballer (1887–1945)

Personal information
- Full name: Ernest Albert Buckland
- Born: 12 July 1887 New Plymouth, Taranaki, New Zealand
- Died: 23 January 1945 (aged 57) Petone, Lower Hutt, New Zealand

Playing information
- Position: Wing, Centre
Representative
Years	Team	Pld	T	G	FG	P
1909–1911	Taranaki
1909–11	New Zealand	4	1	0	0	3
1912	Wellington

Ernest Buckland (1887–1945) was a New Zealand rugby league player who represented New Zealand between 1909 and 1911.

== Playing career ==
Buckland played for Taranaki in their first ever game of rugby league in 1908. In 1909 he first played for New Zealand, being selected as part of the squad that toured Australia.

In 1910 Buckland played in the Test match against the touring Great Britain Lions side, scoring a try. He then toured Australia the following year.

Buckland later moved to Wellington, playing for the Wellington rugby league team in 1912.

He was named in the Taranaki Rugby League's team of the century in 2008.
