= William Tyler (rugby) =

NZ international rugby league footballer

Billy Tyler
Personal information
- Full name: William Thomas Tyler
- Born: 22 August 1880 New Zealand
- Died: 20 May 1919 (aged 38) Nihotupu, Auckland, New Zealand

Playing information
- Height: 5 ft 8 in (1.73 m)
- Weight: 86 kg (13 st 8 lb)

Rugby union
- Position: Wing, Scrum-half
Club
Years	Team	Pld	T	G	FG	P
1900–07	City (ARU)	71	35	28	1	170
Representative
Years	Team	Pld	T	G	FG	P
1901–06	Auckland B	6	3	0	0	9
1902–07	Auckland Trial	5	2	0	0	6
1904–07	Auckland (inter-union)	6	1	0	0	3
1904–07	Auckland	12	4	0	0	12

Rugby league
- Position: Centre, Stand-off, Halfback, Loose forward
Club
Years	Team	Pld	T	G	FG	P
1909	City Rovers	1	1	0	0	3
1909–11	Ponsonby United	8	0	0	0	0
	Total	9	1	0	0	3
Representative
Years	Team	Pld	T	G	FG	P
1907–08	New Zealand	26	8	2	0	28
1908–09	Auckland	7	2	11	0	28
- Relatives: George Tyler (brother)

William "Bill" Thomas Tyler was a New Zealand rugby footballer, who was part of the professional 1907-1908 New Zealand rugby tour of Great Britain. His older brother, George Tyler, also played rugby for City and Auckland, and represented the All Blacks 36 times from 1903 to 1906.

== Rugby Football ==
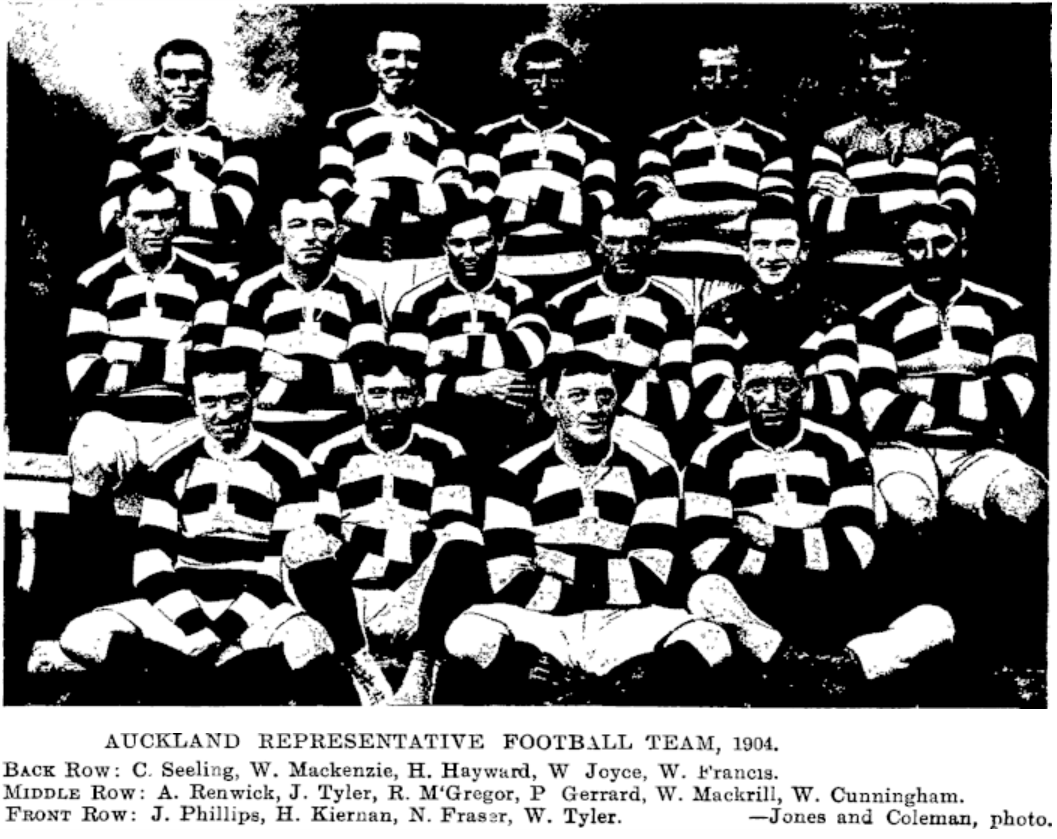

He started his career playing rugby union for the City Club in Auckland. Tyler was a Scrum-Half but also played at Wing-Forward, a position that had already been abandoned in other countries. Aged 25, he was selected for Auckland in 1905 and was part of the team that won the Ranfurly Shield from Wellington. Tyler had scored the winning try and was well known for this deed.

== Rugby League ==
In 1907, Tyler joined the professional All Blacks in their tour of Great Britain and Australia. Like the rest of the touring party, Tyler was banned for life by the New Zealand Rugby Union. While on tour, he played in six test matches and scored the match winning try in the third test against Great Britain. He then played in the first ever trans-Tasman test which was the debut match of the Australia national rugby league team. In all tour games, Tyler scored three tries.

Following the tour's return to New Zealand, Tyler became one of the founding member of the Ponsonby United Rugby League Club in 1908 alongside fellow tourist Charles Dunning. He also played for Auckland and was part of the first ever provincial rugby league match in New Zealand, in which Auckland defeated Wellington 16–14.

== Death ==
Tyler died while under anaesthetic due to respiratory failure. He had been ill for quite some time. He was working as a blacksmith and living at Nihotupu in West Auckland at the time of his death. He was buried at Waikaraka Cemetery (Area 3, Block 8, Plot 109).
