= Harold Rowe =

NZ international rugby league footballer

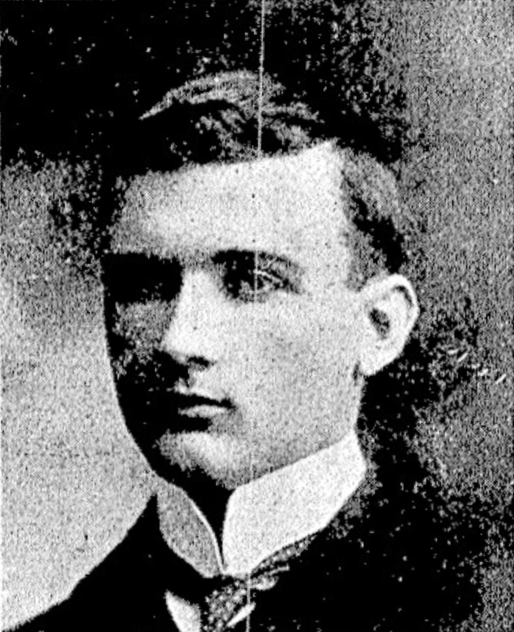

Personal information
- Full name: Francis Harold Rowe
- Born: 10 July 1883 Auckland, New Zealand
- Died: 28 October 1958 (aged 75) Auckland, New Zealand

Playing information
- Height: 175 cm (5 ft 9 in)
- Weight: 77 kg (12 st 2 lb)

Rugby union
- Position: Fullback, Centre
Club
| Years | Team | Pld | T | G | FG | P |
|---|---|---|---|---|---|---|
| | Auckland |

Rugby league
- Position: Fullback, Wing, Centre
Club
| Years | Team | Pld | T | G | FG | P |
|---|---|---|---|---|---|---|
| 1909–10 | Leeds | 33 | 12 | 0 | 0 | 36 |
Representative
| Years | Team | Pld | T | G | FG | P |
| 1907–09 | New Zealand | 44 | 25 | 1 | 0 | 77 |
| 1908 | Auckland | 3 | 3 | 0 | 0 | 9 |

Coaching information
Representative
| Years | Team | Gms | W | D | L | W% |
| 1919 | Auckland | 1 | 0 | 0 | 1 | 0 |

Harold Francis Rowe was a New Zealand rugby footballer who was part of the professional 1907–08 New Zealand rugby tour of Australia and Great Britain.

== Early life ==
He was born on July 10, 1883. His parents were Martha Bell and Francis Rowe. In 1914 he married Hilda Laura Norton. Rowe was a qualified accountant. They had at least two children (Harold Norton Rowe, 1914 and Gladys Ruth Rowe, 1917).

== Playing career ==
=== Rugby union career ===
Rowe played Rugby union for the Newton club in Auckland, usually fullback, but also as a wing or centre.

=== Rugby league career ===
He was selected for the professional All Blacks tour of 1907–1908, in part because of his utility value. Rowe became an invaluable part of the touring team and between 1907 and 1909 he was to play in nine rugby league test matches. In 1908 he played in the first ever trans-Tasman test which was the début match of the Australia national rugby league team. He scored two tries in the second test match against Australia, a game which New Zealand won 11–10 to clinch the series. Rowe finished the tour with ten tries overall, including touring games.

In 1909 he again toured Australia with the New Zealand side.

Like many of the touring party he later returned to England, signing with Leeds in September 1909.

=== Challenge Cup Final appearances ===
Harold Rowe did not play (Jimmy Fawcett played on the wing) in Leeds' 7–7 draw with Hull F.C. in the 1910 Challenge Cup Final during the 1909–10 season at Fartown Ground, Huddersfield, on Saturday 16 April 1910, in front of a crowd of 19,413, this was the first Challenge Cup Final to be drawn, but played on the wing and scored a try in the 26–12 victory over Hull F.C. in the 1909–10 Challenge Cup Final replay during the 1909–10 season at Fartown Ground, Huddersfield on Monday 18 April 1910, in front of a crowd of 11,608, this was Leeds' first Challenge Cup Final win in their first appearance.

=== Coaching ===
In 1919 Rowe coached the Auckland team to play Australia. They went away for a weeks training prior to meeting the Australian side however it made little difference as they were well beaten.
