= Richard Wynyard =

NZ international rugby league footballer (1885-1915)

Dick Wynyard
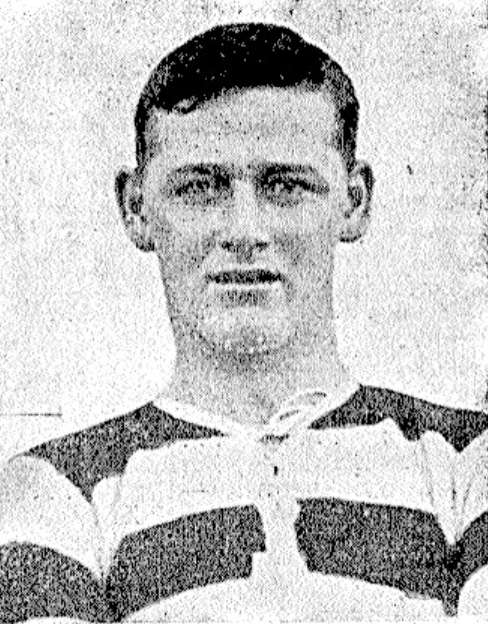

Personal information
- Full name: John Richard Wynyard
- Born: 11 May 1885 Auckland, New Zealand
- Died: 7 April 1915 (aged 29) Auckland, New Zealand

Playing information
- Height: 5 ft 8 in (1.73 m)
- Weight: 11 st 10 lb (74 kg)

Rugby union
- Position: First five-eighth
Club
Years	Team	Pld	T	G	FG	P
	North Shore RFC
Representative
Years	Team	Pld	T	G	FG	P
1905–07	Auckland	8	8	0	0	24

Rugby league
- Position: Halfback
Club
Years	Team	Pld	T	G	FG	P
1909	North Shore	2	0	0	0	0
Representative
Years	Team	Pld	T	G	FG	P
1907–08	New Zealand	45 (8)	27 (7)	1	1	85 (21)
1908–09	Auckland	8	3	0	0	9
- Relatives: William Wynyard (brother); Tabby Wynyard (uncle)

John Richard "Dick" Wynyard (10 May 1885 – 7 April 1915) was a New Zealand rugby footballer who was part of the professional 1907-1908 New Zealand rugby tour of Great Britain. Richard was the brother of William Wynyard. He had 2 sisters, Kathleen Amelia Wynyard (1887-1965), and Audrey Gertrude Wynyard (1892-1920), and 2 brothers, Leslie Henry (Hec) Wynyard (1889-1985), and Sydney Montague Wynyard (1894-1953)

== Early years ==
From a sporting family that included three uncles that were part of the 1888-1889 New Zealand Native football team that toured Great Britain. One of these three, Tabby Wynyard went on the represent the All Blacks. Richard followed his family tradition, becoming a noted rugby union player and a civil servant clerk.

== Rugby Football ==
Living in Devonport, Wynyard was part of the North Shore Rugby Club and won selection for Auckland when aged only 20. In 1907 he was nominated for the North Island team but did not play after he, along with eleven other Auckland nominations, refused to sign a declaration that he would remain an amateur player.

== Rugby League ==
Wynyard sitting with the ball before Auckland's October 9 match against Wellington at Victoria Park.

Wynyard moving to get the ball in Auckland's 19-22 loss to Wellington on October 9, 1909. Wynyard was the captain of the Auckland side in their four matches.

Wynyard was then selected to be part of the professional All Blacks 1907-08 tour of Australia and Great Britain alongside his brother Billy. Wynyard had to resign his government job to be part of the tour, but the move paid off as he ended up playing in all eight test matches. Out of the 49 tour matches Richard played in 44 of them, more than any other player. He scored 28 tries and kicked a goal and a field goal.

Unlike many of the touring party he remained in New Zealand after the tour, captaining Auckland in the first ever provincial match against Wellington on 24 August 1908. He, along with his brother, later helped form the North Shore Albions Rugby League Club - which broke away from the North Shore Rugby Club.

== Death ==
Richard committed suicide in 1915 in Auckland by cutting his throat; he was despondent as he had been unable to find work as a clerk, and the coroner’s verdict was temporary insanity. He was buried at Belmont on the North Shore of Auckland. He was unmarried and had no children.
