= Thomas Houghton (rugby league) =

NZ international rugby league player

Personal information
- Full name: Thomas Herbert Houghton
- Born: Merseyside, United Kingdom

Playing information
- Position: Fullback, Centre, Scrum-half
Club
Years	Team	Pld	T	G	FG	P
	Liverpool City
1907	St. Helens
1909	City Rovers	1	0	1	0	2
1909–10	Newton Rangers	8	2	0	0	6
	Total	9	2	1	0	8
Representative
Years	Team	Pld	T	G	FG	P
1908–09	Auckland	2	1	1	0	5
1909	New Zealand	6	0	7	0	14

Thomas Herbert Houghton was an English-born rugby league footballer who represented New Zealand in 1909.

== Personal life ==
Houghton was born in England and was one of two sons of Joseph Houghton. Joseph served as the chairman of the Northern Union before migrating to Auckland with Thomas and helping set up the Auckland Rugby League. Houghton's brother, Samuel, later served as the secretary of the ARL.

== Playing career ==
Houghton was signed by St. Helens from Liverpool City in 1907, however he never played a first team match for the club.

Houghton then moved to New Zealand and played for Auckland in their third ever match on 17 September 1908 against Taranaki.

He was then part of the City combination that played against the North Shore on 24 July 1909 in the Auckland Rugby League's first ever sanctioned match. He again played for Auckland that year and toured Australia with New Zealand. On 3 July he played for New Zealand in the third Test against Australia.

Houghton joined the new Newton Rangers club and played for them in the inaugural Auckland Rugby League competition in 1910.

== Later years ==
Houghton served as an official at the North Sydney Bears club in the NSWRL Premiership.
