= 1909 New Zealand Māori rugby league tour of Australia =

The 1909 New Zealand Māori rugby league tour of Australia was a tour made by a group of New Zealand Māori rugby footballers who played rugby league matches in Queensland and New South Wales. The tour followed on from another Māori tour of Australia the previous year and a tour by the New Zealand national side a month earlier. The Māori side played the Australian national side four times, winning one of the "test" matches.

== The tour ==
Following the first "test", won by the Māori 16–14, about 5,000 of the 30,000 crowd invaded the pitch, upset with the standard of refereeing. Only about a dozen police were present and it took them almost an hour to assist the referee from the ground.

Before the fourth "test" nine players from the tour were detained, after Robert Jack claimed he was owed money relating to the 1908 tour. The NSWRL paid Jack his claimed debt, rather than risk the match being called off.

The team were awarded the O T Punch Cup for their victories over Sydney teams. The cup had been damaged when the crowd invaded the pitch in the first "test".

== Aftermath ==
The 1909 side was the first to wear a kiwi emblem on their uniforms. The New Zealand national side is now called the Kiwis.

== Squad ==
Only 19 players were involved in the squad, with a maximum of 18 available for selection at any one time. Seventeen travelled with the main party, however Nirai Whareure broke his collarbone after the first match. Tohe Herangi joined the touring party after the first match and Hone Tuki arrived in time for the first 'test' match.

Mākereti (Maggie) and Murai (Bella) Papakura and two Māori chiefs travelled with the side. NSW selector Denis Lutge was assigned to the team as an advisor.

Maori name	English name	Position	Bio
Nirai Whareure	Ned McRae		Captain, broke his collarbone in the first match
Ariki Haira	Alex Stanaway	forward	From Auckland and originally from Northern Wairoa, later represented New Zealand, toured in 1908
Tohe Herangi	T Searanche		
Pou Kopana	Paul Coban		
Rewi Maniapoto	Sid Ellis		
Witana Mare	Murray		
Hauauru Pakere	Frank Barclay	utility back	From Tauranga, later represented New Zealand, toured in 1908
Punga Pakere	Glen Barclay	forward	From Tauranga, brother of Frank, later played for the North Sydney Bears, toured in 1908
Te Keepa Pouwiuwhiu	Ernie Asher	three-quarters	From Tauranga, brother of Albert, later represented New Zealand, toured in 1908
Te Rira Pukere			
Riki Papakura		utility back	From Manonui, later played for Australasia and Warrington, toured in 1908
Nikorima Ratete	Nikki Rogers	inside back	From Rotorua, also toured in 1908
Tutu Roera	Tutu Royal		
Puhipi Rukutai	Jim Rukutai	forward	Later represented and coached New Zealand
Hone Taonui	John Hetet		
Hone Tuki		three-quarters	from Northland, toured in 1908
Arapeta Paurini Wharepapa	Albert Asher	three-quarters	Former All Black who would later represent New Zealand and Australasia, toured in 1908
Tāmati Wikiriwhi	Tāmati Wilkinson		
Te Kanawa Wi Neera			

== Match results ==
Before the side left New Zealand they lost 14–21 to Auckland on 10 July 1909 at Victoria Park in front of 2–3,000 spectators.

Date	Opponent	Venue	Result	Score	Attendance	Report
24 July	New South Wales	Royal Agricultural Society Showground, Sydney	Win	24-21	28,000	
28 July	New South Wales	Royal Agricultural Society Showground, Sydney	Win	14-11	6,000	
31 July	Australia	Royal Agricultural Society Showground, Sydney	Win	16-14	30,000	
4 August	Newcastle	Newcastle Showgrounds, Newcastle	Loss	6-7	2,000	
7 August	Queensland	Brisbane Cricket Ground, Brisbane	Loss	11-21	7,000	
11 August	Queensland	Brisbane Cricket Ground, Brisbane	Win	36-25	6,000	
14 August	Australia	Brisbane Cricket Ground, Brisbane	Loss	13-16	8,000	
21 August	Australia	Royal Agricultural Society Showground, Sydney	Loss	16-23	11,000	
25 August	New South Wales	Wentworth Park, Sydney	Win	12-8	3,000	
28 August	Australia	Royal Agricultural Society Showground, Sydney	Loss	13-20	7,500	
