= Ernie Asher =

NZ international rugby league footballer

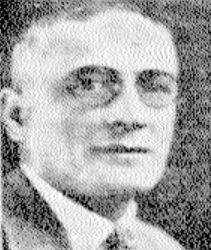

Personal information
- Full name: Te Keepa Pouwhiuwhiu
- Born: 21 April 1886 New Zealand
- Died: 10 April 1973 (aged 86) New Zealand

Playing information
- Weight: 73 kg (11 st 7 lb)
- Position: Fullback, Wing, Centre
Club
Years	Team	Pld	T	G	FG	P
1910–1918	City Rovers	68	2	72	0	150
Representative
Years	Team	Pld	T	G	FG	P
1908–1909	New Zealand Māori	17	7	6	0	33
1910–15	Auckland	12	7	2	0	25
1910–11	New Zealand	6 (1)	0	0	0	0
- Source: Papers Past. * club game total incomplete due to lack of records.
- Relatives: Albert Asher (brother); John Atirau Asher (brother); Katherine Te Rongokahira Parata (sister); Taare Parata (brother-in-law)

Ernest "Ernie" Asher (21 April 1886 – 10 April 1973), also known as Te Keepa Pouwhiuwhiu, was a New Zealand rugby union and professional rugby league footballer who played representative rugby league (RL) for New Zealand Māori and New Zealand. His brothers included John Atirau Asher and fellow international Albert Asher.

== Early life ==
Asher was born in Tauranga in 1886, the seventh of eleven children. His mother was Katerina Te Atirau, a woman from the Te Arawa iwi, descended from Ngāti Pikiao and Ngāti Pūkenga iwi. His maternal grandmother was Rahera Te Kahuhiapo. His father was David Asher, a hotel keeper. His paternal grandfather was Asher Asher, who was a prominent Jewish trader during Auckland's early days. His great-grandfather, through his grandmother Hannah Keesing Asher, was Henry (Hartog) Keesing, a prominent Auckland merchant and one of the earliest Jewish settlers in Auckland.

Two of his brothers were Albert Asher and John Atirau Asher, while he also played with another brother, George, for City Rovers in the mid-1910s.

== Playing career ==
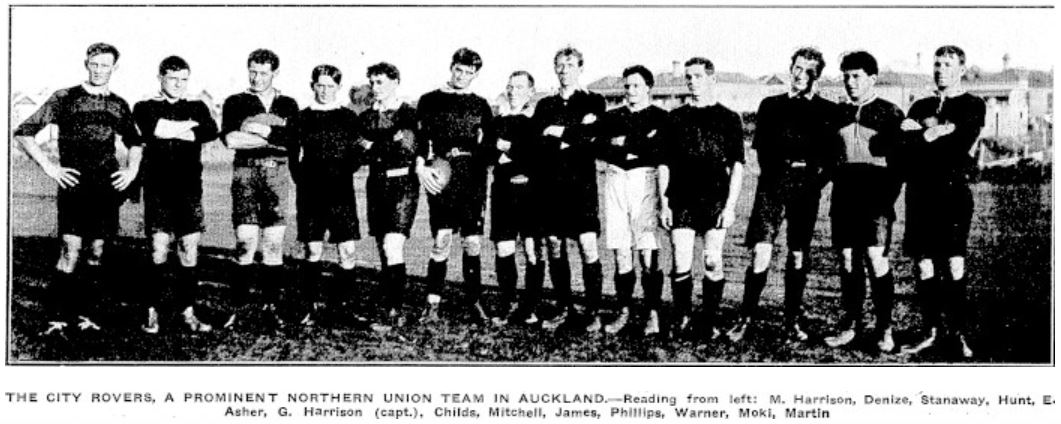
Ernie Asher, 5th from the left in the City Rovers side, 11 May 1912

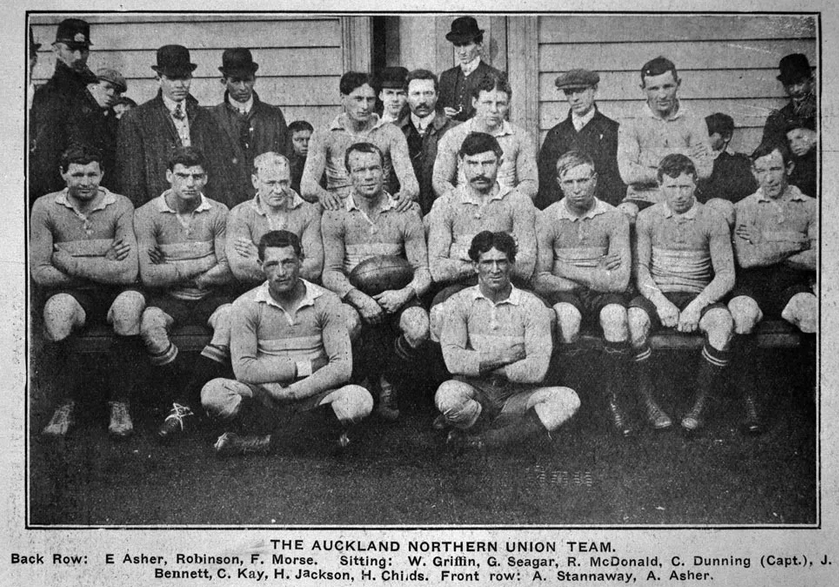
Ernie Asher in the 1911 Auckland team to play Wellington on 5 August

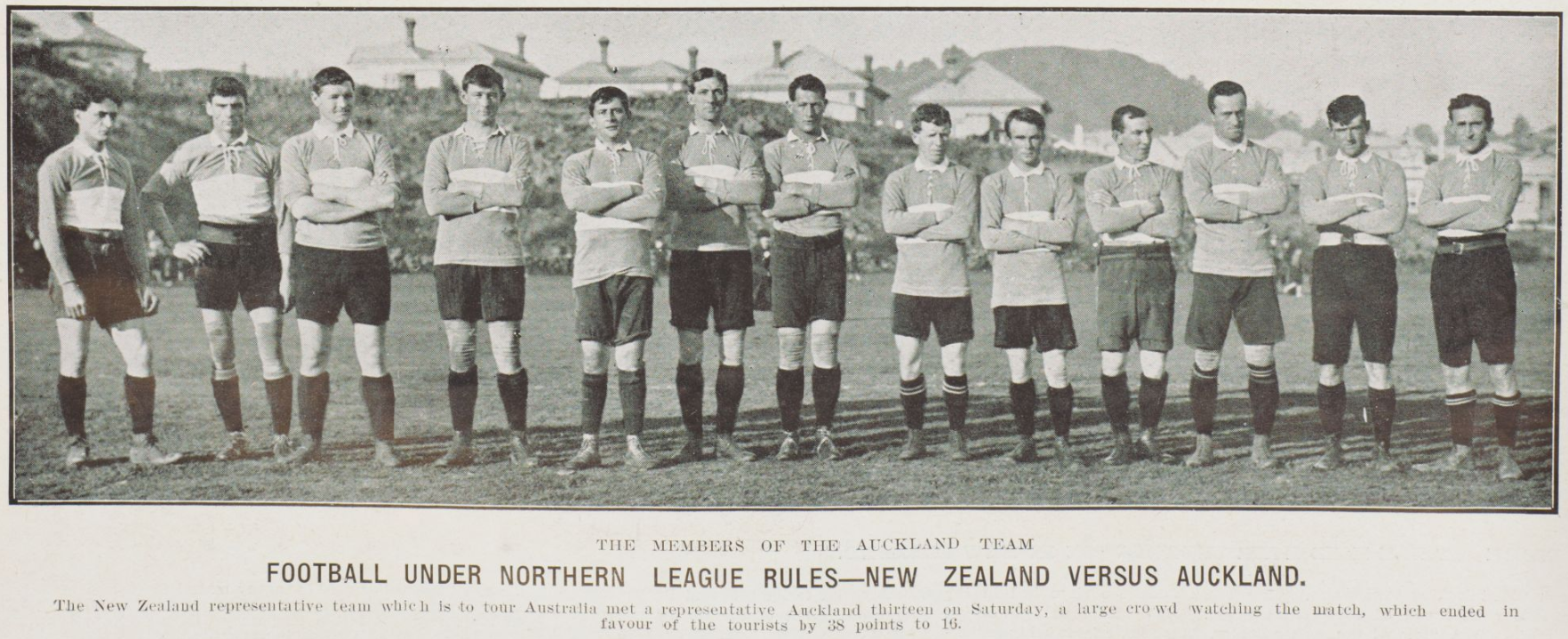
Ernie Asher on the left of the Auckland rugby league side in 1912 at Eden Park before their match with New Zealand.

Asher had originally played rugby union for Tauranga and Ponsonby before being convinced by his brother to take up the new Northern union code.

Asher was part of the 1908 New Zealand Māori rugby league tour of Australia which was organised by his brother Albert. He again toured Australia in 1909 with New Zealand Māori. He was involved in the formation of the City Rovers club in the new Auckland Rugby League competition in 1909.

In 1910 Asher was selected to represent New Zealand against the touring Great Britain Lions. This was his only test match for New Zealand, although he also played for the side in 1911 during the tour of Australia.

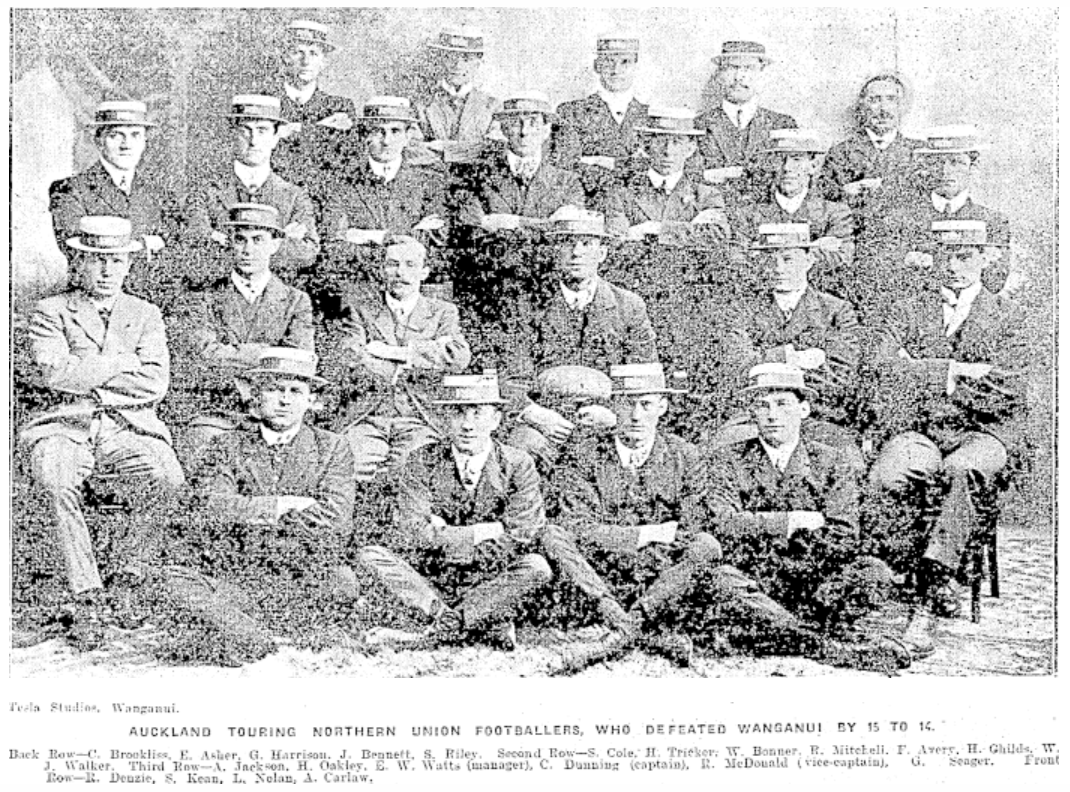

During the 1910 season, Asher was part of the Auckland side that toured the country.

Asher played for Auckland in 1912 but was not selected for the New Zealand side. He last played for the City Rovers in 1916

== Administration career ==
In 1927 Asher served as an Auckland selector before beginning a long career as an administrator. Between 1932 and 1968 Asher served on the New Zealand Rugby League board and he also served as secretary of New Zealand Maori Rugby League.

In 1969 the New Zealand Rugby League held a special match to celebrate its diamond jubilee. Asher was present at the match and carried out the ceremonial kick-off.

== Personal life ==
Asher worked as a hairdresser and was also a noted weightlifter, serving on the Auckland Weightlifting Association's committee. Asher's only son, George, was killed during World War II. Asher died on 10 April 1973. He was survived by Doreen Maxwell Dallow, a daughter as a result of a liaison with Ida Maxwell.

Asher is the grandfather of Ross Dallow and Graeme Dallow, two senior members of the New Zealand Police. He is also the great-grandfather of broadcaster Simon Dallow and bobsledder Matthew Dallow.
