= Dallow (surname) =

Dallow is a surname. Notable people with the surname include:

- Graeme Dallow (1930–2014), New Zealand police officer
- Paul Dallow, New Zealand hurdler
- Ross Dallow (1937–2020), New Zealand police officer
- Simon Dallow (born 1964), New Zealand journalist, barrister and television personality

== See also ==
- Dalloz (surname)
