= Rahera Te Kahuhiapo =

New Zealand Māori tribal leader (died 1910)

Rahera Te Kahuhiapo (c. 1820s – 12 October 1910) was a notable New Zealand tribal leader. Of Māori descent, she identified with the Ngāti Pikiao, Ngāti Pūkenga and Te Arawa iwi. She was born in Motutawa Pā, Rotorua, New Zealand.

Te Kahuhiapo's descendants include Ernie Asher, Ross Dallow, Graeme Dallow, Simon Dallow and Matthew Dallow.
