= Patrick Tuifua =

French rugby union player

- Born: 25 August 2004 (age 22) New Caledonia
- Height: 191 cm (6 ft 3 in)
- Weight: 113 kg (249 lb; 17 st 11 lb)
- School: Lindisfarne College
- Notable relative: Laurent Simutoga (uncle)

Rugby union career
- Position: Flanker
- Current team: Toulon
Senior career
| Years | Team | Apps | (Points) |
| 2023–2024 | Hawke's Bay | 8 | (0) |
| 2025– | Toulon | 2 | (0) |
- Correct as of 7 May 2026
International career
| Years | Team | Apps | (Points) |
| 2024 | France U20 | 2 | (5) |
- Correct as of 6 August 2024

Patrick Tuifua (born 25 August 2004) is a French rugby union player, who currently plays as a loose forward for Toulon in the French Top 14. He previously played for Hawke's Bay in New Zealand's domestic National Provincial Championship competition.

== Early life ==
Born in New Caledonia, a French territory in the Pacific Ocean, Tuifua moved to New Zealand in 2020 at the age of 15 years-old and attended Lindisfarne College on a scholarship.

== Senior career ==
Tuifua played for Hawke's Bay in the National Provincial Championship in 2023 and 2024, and has represented the Hurricanes at age-grade level.

In April 2025, Top 14 club Toulon announced that Tuifua had signed a three-year deal with the club, starting from the 2025–26 season.

== International career ==
Tuifua played for France U20 at the 2024 Six Nations Under 20s Championship.

== Personal life ==
Tuifua is the nephew of former rugby union player Laurent Simutoga.
