= Rahera =

Rahera or Rāhera is a Māori given name. It is a Māori transliteration of the name Rachel. Notable people with the name include:

- Rahera Te Kahuhiapo (c. 1820s–1910), New Zealand Māori tribal leader
- Rahera Windsor (1925–2004), Māori community leader in the United Kingdom
