= Albert Asher =

NZ dual-code rugby international footballer (1879–1965)

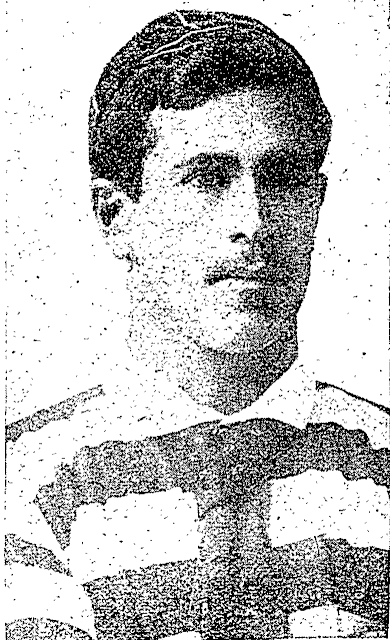

Personal information
- Full name: Arapeta Paurini Wharepapa
- Born: 3 December 1879 Tauranga, New Zealand
- Died: 8 January 1965 (aged 85) Auckland, New Zealand

Playing information
- Height: 167 cm (5 ft 6 in)
- Weight: 74 kg (11 st 9 lb)

Rugby union
- Position: Wing, First five-eighth
Club
Years	Team	Pld	T	G	FG	P
1897	Tauranga	2	0	0	0	0
1897	Karikari	1	0	0	0	0
1898	Parnell	5	6	0	0	18
1899–05	City	57	50	0	0	150
1906	Ngawaro	1	0	0	0	0
1906	Karikari	5	3	0	0	9
	Total	71	59	0	0	177
Representative
Years	Team	Pld	T	G	FG	P
1896–06	Tauranga	7	2	0	0	6
1898–05	Auckland Trial	10	7	0	0	21
1898–04	Auckland Inter-union	7	5	0	0	15
1898–07	Auckland	22	11	0	0	33
1899–07	Auckland B	3	4	0	0	12
1902	North Island	1	1	0	0	3
1903	New Zealand (Tests)	11 (1)	17 (1)	0	0	51 (3)

Rugby league
- Position: Wing, Centre
Club
Years	Team	Pld	T	G	FG	P
1910–17	City Rovers	53	17	25	1	103
Representative
Years	Team	Pld	T	G	FG	P
1908–10	New Zealand Māori	22	27	16	0	113
1910	Australasia	2	0	0	0	0
1908–15	Auckland	18	10	1	0	34
1910–13	New Zealand	7	3	0	0	9

Coaching information
Club
Years	Team	Gms	W	D	L	W%
1934	Tuakau
- Relatives: Ernie Asher (brother); John Atirau Asher (brother); Katherine Te Rongokahira Parata (sister); Taare Parata (brother-in-law)

Arapeta Paurini Wharepapa (3 December 1879 – 8 January 1965), or Albert Asher as he was more commonly known, was a New Zealand dual-code international rugby union and professional rugby league footballer who played in the 1890s, 1900s, 1910s and 1920s. At representative level Asher played rugby union for New Zealand, North Island and Auckland playing on the Wing and played rugby league at representative level for Australasia, New Zealand, Auckland and the New Zealand Māori rugby league team. One of his brothers, Ernie, was also a rugby league international while another, John, became a Ngati Pukenga and Ngati Pikiao leader, and another brother, Thomas also played representative rugby for Tauranga. Katherine Te Rongokahira Parata was a sister.

== Rugby union career ==
Asher was born in Tauranga, and was only 11 years old when he played his first senior representative game of rugby union, for a Tauranga team against a Rotorua team. Eighteen months later he played for Tauranga against Auckland, becoming the youngest senior representative on record in New Zealand rugby union. Asher played for Tauranga against Auckland at Potters Park on 17 August aged 16 after playing against Rotorua the week prior. The Bay Of Plenty Times reported after the match against Auckland that "Asher was the hero of the team, his defence was superb, and was greatly admired by the gallery as well as the Rugby Union Committee".

Asher later moved to Auckland, joining Parnell in the Auckland club competition, making his Auckland debut in 1898. In his first game on 9 June 1898 he played for Parnell against North Shore on their opponents ground. Asher scored 3 tries in a 34-4 win. He spent several seasons playing for Auckland. On 9 July after just four club matches for Parnell he was chosen to play in an Auckland trial match. He scored a try and was then selected to make his Auckland debut against Thames in an inter-union match against Thames on 16 July. In his first match for Auckland he scored 2 tries, the second being a "remarkable" run which started well inside his own half. His first came after he "whipped in, and gathering up the ball, beat three Thames men, and cleverly grounded the leather across the line on the corner". Then in the second half "Laws got the oval, and passed along to Asher, who started on what proved to be a remarkable run. At the 25 he was picked up by the Thames fullback and Paul, and hustled by both, but kept his feet through it all, and continuing on his way, ran round and scored fairly between the posts. A better run has never been seen on the ground. The spectators on the stand rose as one man, and the applause must have been audible a mile off". On Monday 4 September 1899 Asher was asked to fill in for the Tauranga side in their match with Franklin despite being resident in Auckland and playing for various Auckland rep teams in the weeks prior and following. Although he did tend to return to Tauranga outside the rugby season. Tauranga were going to struggle to field a full team hence the request. He featured prominently in a match which they won.

His form was outstanding in 1903 for city and he scored 17 tries in just 8 matches. He was subsequently selected for the New Zealand tour of Australia where he won a cap playing for the New Zealand team against Australia at Sydney Cricket Ground on 15 August 1903, scoring a try. While Asher played in only one Test match, he played in 11 games for the All Blacks and scored 53 points. Remarkably after returning from the Australian tour he played in 7 matches for Auckland and failed to register a single try.

In 1904, he was chosen to be the City captain for the season. During the season while working with the fire brigade, he suffered a leg injury that kept him from meeting the 1904 British team that were touring New Zealand, and he subsequently missed touring Great Britain with the Original All Blacks. After two years out of the game Asher again represented Auckland in 1907, before changing codes to rugby league.

He moved back to Tauranga in 1906 and played for the Karikari club and also represented the Tauranga representative side. In 1907 he had 'retired' and did not play any matches, instead coaching and refereeing games. Then in July he left farming in the area and moved back to Auckland 'permanently' and when he returned to Auckland was selected to play for Auckland B against Waikato in Hamilton where he scored 2 tries, and then for the full Auckland side against Wanganui and Taranaki where he scored 1 try in each match.

== Rugby league career ==
Asher declined the offer to tour with the 1907–1908 New Zealand professional rugby team due to a broken ankle. In May 1908 he led the first New Zealand Māori rugby league team on a tour of New South Wales and Queensland, where they are credited with financially saving the New South Wales Rugby League. At the time it was reported in New Zealand that they were accidental converts to rugby league, expecting to meet rugby union teams in Sydney, but this has since proved to be a cover story as it was reported well before the team left that they would be playing against rugby league teams. The team twice defeated New South Wales and also defeated Australia in one "test".

On their return Asher represented Auckland in their second match ever, against Wellington.

In 1909 Asher was invited to tour Australia with the 1909 New Zealand side but again declined, opting to remain in Auckland and organise the 1909 New Zealand Māori tour of Australia which was set for later in the year. During the year Asher again represented Auckland and played for the new City Rovers club which had been formed to compete in the new Auckland Rugby League.

In 1910 Asher played for City in the first official week of the Auckland Rugby League competition. On 25 June Asher was sent off by referee Jack Stanaway, the brother of Alex. The rest of the City side walked off in support of Asher. Asher became the first player to face the ARL judiciary, who cautioned him. Asher then travelled to Sydney, where he was part of the Australasian side that played two matches against the 1910 Great Britain team. Asher, who was known for leaping over players – leading to his nickname Opai, clashed with another known leaper, Billy Batten. Asher came into contact with Batten's knee in a mid air collision and was carried from the ground, requiring stitches before he returned.

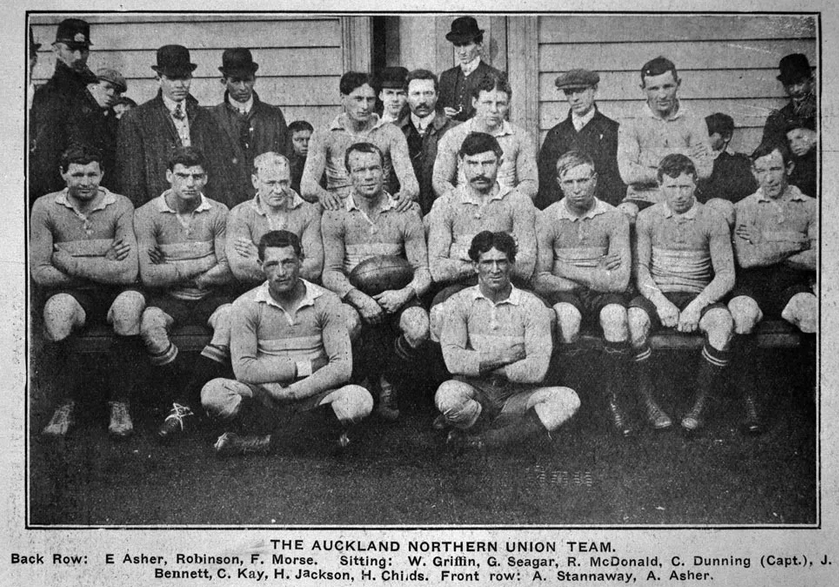
Asher in the Auckland team to play Wellington on 5 August 1911.

Asher was to play against the Lions three more times once they reached New Zealand in July. Asher lined up against them for New Zealand Māori, Auckland and New Zealand. This was Asher's only cap for New Zealand. He finished the season by being part of the City side that won the inaugural competition, being awarded the Myers Cup.

Asher again played for New Zealand on their 1913 tour of Australia, however no test matches were played.

Asher continued to play for City until after the First World War.

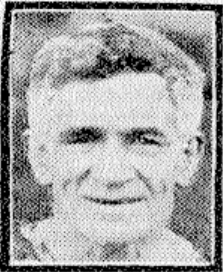

== Later years ==
After retirement Asher became the custodian of Carlaw Park between 1921 and 1945, the home of the Auckland Rugby League. At the end of the season he was given a testimonial match as a farewell as he was returning to Tauranga. The match was between Auckland Māori and Auckland Pākēha. He is buried at Waikumete Cemetery, Auckland.

== Legacy ==
Asher was inducted into the New Zealand Rugby League's Legends of League in 2008.
