= Wattie Barclay =

New Zealand professional rugby player (1894–1985)

Captain Walter Pukauae Barclay MM, QSM
- Born: 19 January 1894; Kawhia, New Zealand
- Died: 2 November 1985 (aged 91); Dargaville, New Zealand
- Alma mater: St John's College, Auckland
- Relatives: Glen Barclay; Frank Barclay
- Military career
- Allegiance: New Zealand
- Branch: New Zealand Military Forces
- Nicknames: Wattie, Wati
- Unit: Māori Pioneer Battalion
- Conflicts: First World War: Gallipoli Campaign (WIA); Western Front; Battle of the Somme; Battle of Messines; Battle of Arras; Battle of Passchendaele; Capture of Le Quesnoy
- Awards: Military Medal (1919); Queen's Service Medal (1978)
- Other work: Captain of the Māori All Blacks

Captain Walter "Wattie" Pukauae Barclay, MM, QSM, (19 January 1894 – 12 November 1985) was a New Zealand rugby union player, sports administrator and military officer. He captained the New Zealand Māori Rugby Team and holds the record for the highest number of tries scored for the team with 40 career tries.

== Personal life ==
Barclay was born in Kawhia and was the son of David Barclay, the Māori interpreter for the 15th New Zealand Parliament. Barclay was a Māori and affiliated with the Ngāti Hikairo iwi.

His brother, Frank Barclay, was a professional rugby league footballer who played representative level rugby league for New Zealand and for the New Zealand Māori team.

His other brother, Glen Barclay, was also a professional rugby league footballer who represented the New Zealand Māori team and was a member of the groundbreaking 1908 New Zealand Māori rugby league tour of Australia.

Barclay is the grandfather of master voyager and co-chair of the national coordinating committee for the Tuia 250 Encounters programme Hoturoa Barclay-Kerr CNZM. He is the granduncle of Fellow of the Royal Society of Arts, Aaron Hape.

== Rugby union career ==
=== Early career ===
Barclay's introduction to provincial rugby came in 1914 when he played break-away for Southern Hawke's Bay. With the outbreak of World War I, Barclay served on the Western Front and played for the New Zealand Māori Pioneer Battalion rugby team. For this team he played the position of centre three-quarters against teams in France, England and Wales. Before returning to New Zealand, he was invited to play for Southern Command against Swansea Rugby Football Club and Llanelli Rugby Football Club. Following the New Zealand Māori Pioneer Battalion's, Barclay was a member of the team that undertook a provincial tour which saw the team lose to Otago, Canterbury and Auckland, draw against Wellington, and winning their five remaining games against Hawke's Bay (twice), Southland, Manawatū, and Poverty Bay.

=== Provincial representation ===
Barclay played representative level rugby for Auckland in the 1910s and for Hawke's Bay in the 1920s. Returning to Dannevirke after World War I, Barclay, along with his brothers Glen and Frank were prominent players for the Aotea Rugby Club, which dominated the Southern Hawke's Bay competition.

Barclay's involvement in the Hawke's Bay provincial team - of which he was the Vice Captain - led to some controversy, most notably in the Ranfurly Shield match against Wairarapa at Masterton in 1927, which came to be known as the Battle of Solway. The game was a rematch with Wairarapa defeating Hawke's Bay 36 days previously. During the match a player was sent off from each side and the game was stopped twice when drunk spectators encroached on the ground. Hawke's Bay won the match 21–10, however, Wairarapa protested that Barclay had not lived in the Hawke's Bay area long enough to meet the eligibility criteria for selection. The New Zealand Rugby Football Union ruled that Barclay was not properly qualified and though Hawke's Bay had won the match, the game and the Ranfurly Shield was awarded to Wairarapa.

=== New Zealand Māori Rugby Team ===
Barclay was first selected for the New Zealand Māori Rugby Team in 1921 and played in the 1921–23 and 1926–27 seasons

He was selected to captain the 1926–27 New Zealand Māori rugby union tour. This was the first official New Zealand Māori team to tour the northern hemisphere and the team claimed 30 wins, 2 draws, and 8 losses on a 40-game tour. Barclay became the leading try-scorer of the tour with 40 tries.

=== Administrator and coach ===
In later life, Barclay remained active in the rugby community as an administrator and coach. He coached the 1948 New Zealand Māori Rugby Team that toured Fiji and was appointed to the New Zealand Māori Rugby Committee from 1949 to 1951.

He was a selector and President of the North Auckland Rugby Union as well as a national selector. Most notably he selected the New Zealand Māori Rugby Teams that played South Africa in 1965 and in the Prince of Wales Cup Challenge in Wellington in 1967.

=== Records ===
Barclay continues to hold the record for the highest number of tries scored for the New Zealand Māori Rugby Team with 40 career tries. He is the fifth-highest points scorer for the team with 129 points scored. He ranks second in the number of tries scored in one match having scored 5 tries against Walcha Rugby Club in 1922. He played 36 matches for the team, making him the eighth most capped player in the team's history.

== Military service ==
=== World War I ===
Alongside his brother Frank, Barclay served with the New Zealand Māori Pioneer Battalion in World War I. He served with the battalion in the Gallipoli campaign where he was injured and invalided back to New Zealand in October 1915. He returned to the Western Front in February 1916 and saw active service at the Somme, Messines Ridge, the Battle of Arras, the Battle of Passchendaele and the Capture of Le Quesnoy.

As well as receiving the Victory Medal, the 1914–15 Star, and the British War Medal, Barclay was awarded the Military Medal in the 1919 New Year Honours for acts of gallantry in the field at the Battle of Passchendaele. His brother Frank was awarded the Distinguished Conduct Medal at the same time. He concluded his service with the rank of Second Lieutenant and was transferred to the Reserve of Officers in 1920.

=== World War II ===
With the outbreak of World War II and as part of the preparations for the possibility of war in the Pacific, New Zealand defensive forces were expanded in 1941 and Barclay was transferred from the Reserve of Officers to the Territorial Force's North Auckland Regiment. Barclay attained the rank of Captain and was awarded the 1939–1945 War Medal and the New Zealand War Service Medal.

== Awards and recognition ==
=== Rugby ===
Many of the 1926–27 New Zealand Māori Rugby Team's matches were watched by the Prince of Wales (later King Edward VIII), including the match at Blackheath. In recognition of the esteem he held the team in he had the Prince of Wales Medal struck. However, due to the request of team manager Ned Parata and Barclay for the team to undertake additional fixtures in Canada, the team left the United Kingdom before the medals could be presented. The team was eventually presented with the medals on their return to New Zealand by Sir Charles Fergusson, the Governor-General of New Zealand.

=== Cultural recognition ===
Following the 1926–27 New Zealand Māori Rugby Team's win over the Vancouver Ruggers in Victoria, British Columbia, Barclay was installed as a Chief of the First Nations in Canada by Chief Clear Sky of the Six Nations of the Grand River. He bestowed Barclay with the name of Chief Ra-Kwa-New-Ha-Ja, which meant "The Winner".

=== Orders and medals ===
Barclay was awarded the Queen's Service Medal in the 1978 Queen's Birthday Honours for community service. His military and state honours, as they would appear in the Order of Wear, are:

| Military Medal | Military Medal | Awarded by George V in the 1919 New Year Honours for acts of gallantry in the field at the Battle of Passchendaele. |
| Queen's Service Medal | Queen's Service Medal | Awarded by Elizabeth II in the 1978 Queen's Birthday Honours for community service. |
| 1914–15 Star ribbon | 1914–15 Star | Campaign medal awarded to British and Imperial forces who served in any theatre of the First World War against the Central European Powers during 1914 and 1915. |
| British War Medal | British War Medal | Campaign medal awarded to British and Imperial forces for service in the First World War. |
| Victory Medal | Victory Medal | Campaign medal awarded to British and Imperial forces for service in the First World War. |
| 1939–1945 War Medal | 1939–1945 War Medal | Campaign medal awarded to citizens of the Commonwealth who had served full-time in the Armed Forces or the Merchant Navy for at least 28 days between 3 September 1939 and 2 September 1945. |
| New Zealand War Service Medal | New Zealand War Service Medal | Campaign medal awarded to members of the New Zealand armed forces, the National Military Reserve and the Home Guard for 28 days' full-time aggregated service or six months' part-time aggregated service between 3 September 1939 and 2 September 1945. |

== Bibliography ==
- Pugsley, Christopher (2018). Te Hokowhitu a Tu : the Maori Pioneer Battalion in the First World War ([New edition] ed.). Auckland [N.Z.] ISBN 978-0-947506-38-4. OCLC 1057617462.
- Cowan, James (1926). The Maoris in the Great War: A History of The New Zealand Native Contingent and Pioneer Battalion: Gallipoli, 1915, France and Flanders, 1916–1918.
- "New Zealand Military Force records for BARCLAY, Walter Pukauwe WWI 13/24a, WWII 34602 – Army" natlib.govt.nz. Retrieved 2022-04-08.
- Neazor, Paul (1997). 100 years of College Rifles, 1897–1997 / by Paul Neazor. Auckland, N.Z.: Celebrity Books. ISBN 0-9583644-0-0. OCLC 154667952.
