= 2024 Six Nations Under 20s Championship =

Under 20 Rugby union competition

- Date: 2 February – 15 March 2024
- Countries: England; France; Ireland; Italy; Scotland; Wales

Tournament statistics
- Champions: England (10th title)
- Matches played: 15
- Tries scored: 109 (7.27 per match)
- Top point scorer: Jack Murphy (36)
- Top try scorer: Danny Sheahan (5)
- Official website: sixnationsrugby.com

The 2024 Six Nations Under 20s Championship was the 17th Six Nations Under 20s Championship, the annual northern hemisphere rugby union championship for players under 20 years of age. Ireland were the reigning champions, having won the title in both 2022 and 2023. They managed four wins and a draw to match England's record for the championship, but England secured more bonus points to claim their 10th title, their first since 2021.

== Table ==
Pos	Team	Pld	W	D	L	PF	PA	PD	TF	TA	TB	LB	Pts
1	England	5	4	1	0	171	98	+73	24	14	5	0	23
2	Ireland	5	4	1	0	171	93	+78	23	12	4	0	22
3	France	5	2	0	3	156	131	+25	21	18	4	2	14
4	Italy	5	2	0	3	118	120	−2	16	17	1	1	10
5	Wales	5	2	0	3	91	160	−69	14	23	2	0	10
6	Scotland	5	0	0	5	74	179	−105	11	26	1	0	1

Source: Six Nations Rugby

Table ranking rules:

- Four match points are awarded for a win.
- Two match points are awarded for a draw.
- A bonus match point is awarded to a team that scores four or more tries in a match or loses a match by seven points or fewer. If a team scores four tries in a match and loses by seven points or fewer, they are awarded both bonus points.
- Three bonus match points are awarded to a team that wins all five of their matches (known as a Grand Slam). This ensures that a Grand Slam winning team reaches a minimum of 23 points, and thus always ranks over a team who won four matches in which they also were awarded four try bonus points and were also awarded two bonus points (a try bonus and a losing bonus) in the match that they lost for a total of 22 points.
- Tie-breakers
  - If two or more teams are tied on match points, the team with the better points difference (points scored less points conceded) is ranked higher.
  - If the above tie-breaker fails to separate tied teams, the team that scored the higher number of total tries in their matches is ranked higher.
  - If two or more teams remain tied for first place at the end of the championship after applying the above tiebreakers, the title is shared between them.

== Fixtures ==
The fixtures for the tournament were announced on 20 July 2023.

=== Week 1 ===
2 February 2024
19:15

Italy	11–36	England (1 BP)
Try: Siciliano 67' m Pen: Pucciarello (2) 10', 18'	Report	Try: Pollock (3) 19', 33', 77'; Carnduff 39'; Bellamy 62'; Con: Kerr (2) 20', 34'; Taylor (2) 63', 78'; Pen: Kerr 2'

Stadio Comunale di Monigo, Treviso
Attendance: 4,016
Referee: Evan Urruzmendi (France)

2 February 2024
19:15

(1 BP) Wales	37–29	Scotland (1 BP)
Try: Anderson 17'; Price (2) 28', 71'; Morse 32'; Ackerman 60'; Lewis 76'; Con: Wilde 32'; Ford 72'; Pen: Wilde 13'	Report	Try: Young (2) 9', 34'; Douglas (2) 23', 64'; Yule 44'; Con: Coates 34', 44'

Eirias Stadium, Colwyn Bay
Referee: Jérémy Rozier (France)

3 February 2024
20:10

(2 BP) France	31–37	Ireland (1 BP)
Try: Castro (2) 11', 35'; Tuifua 46'; Perrin 72'; Con: Raffy (4) 12', 36', 47', 73'; Pen: Raffy 64'	Report	Try: Sheahan 4'; Gleeson 24'; Gavin 51'; Finn Treacy 67'; Con: J. Murphy (4) 5', 25', 52', 68'; Pen: J. Murphy (3) 42', 76', 80'

Stade Maurice David, Aix-en-Provence
Referee: Morné Ferreira (South Africa)

FB	15	Mathis Ferté
RW	14	Grégoire Arfeuil	(yellow card) 49'	(substituted off) 62'
OC	13	Robin Taccola
IC	12	Axel Desperes
LW	11	Hoani Bosmorin		(substituted off) 65'
FH	10	Tom Raffy
SH	9	Léo Carbonneau
N8	8	Mathis Castro (c)		(substituted off) 69'
OF	7	Patrick Tuifua
BF	6	Noa Zinzen		(substituted off) 48'
RL	5	Corentin Mezou
LL	4	Charly Gambini		(substituted off) 47'
TP	3	Zinedine Aouad		(substituted off) 63'
HK	2	Barnabe Massa		(substituted off) 62'
LP	1	Lino Julien		(substituted off) 52'
Replacements:
HK	16	Robin Couly		(substituted on) 62'
PR	17	Leo Ametlla		(substituted on) 52'
PR	18	Thomas Duchene		(substituted on) 63'
LK	19	Antonin Corso		(substituted on) 47'
BR	20	Mael Perrin		(substituted on) 69'
BR	21	Joe Quere Karaba		(substituted on) 48'
WG	22	Noah Nene		(substituted on) 65'
WG	23	Max Biasotto		(substituted on) 62'
Coach:
Sébastien Calvet

FB	15	Ben O'Connor	(substituted off) 22' (substituted on) 32' (substituted off) 40'
RW	14	Finn Treacy
OC	13	Wilhelm de Klerk
IC	12	Hugh Gavin
LW	11	Hugo McLaughlin
FH	10	Jack Murphy
SH	9	Oliver Coffey
N8	8	Gleeson
OF	7	Bryn Ward	(substituted off) 74'
BF	6	Joe Hopes
RL	5	Evan O'Connell (c)
LL	4	Alan Spicer	(substituted off) 59'
TP	3	Andrew Sparrow	(substituted off) 45'
HK	2	Danny Sheahan	(substituted off) 62'
LP	1	Alex Usanov	(substituted off) 68'
Replacements:
HK	16	Henry Walker	(substituted on) 62'
PR	17	Ben Howard	(substituted on) 68'
PR	18	Jacob Boyd	(substituted on) 45'
LK	19	Billy Corrigan	(substituted on) 74'
FL	20	Luke Murphy	(substituted on) 59'
SH	21	Tadhg Brophy
FH	22	Sean Naughton
WG	23	Ethan Graham	(substituted on) 22' (substituted off) 32' (substituted on) 40'
Coach:
Richie Murphy

=== Week 2 ===
9 February 2024
19:15

(1 BP) England	28–7	Wales
Try: Wills 10'; McParland 15'; Jones 29'; Kirk 73'; Con: Bellamy 74'; Pen: Taylor 45'; Bellamy 59'	Report	Try: Anderson 31'; Con: Wilde 32'

Recreation Ground, Bath
Referee: Aimee Barrett-Theron (South Africa)

9 February 2024
19:15

Ireland	23–22	Italy (1 BP)
Try: O'Connell 20'; O'Connor 28'; Edogbo 73'; Con: J. Murphy 21'; Pen: J. Murphy (2) 3', 60'	Report	Try: Scalabrin (2) 23', 30'; Gritti 65'; Con: Pucciarello (2) 24', 31'; Pen: Pucciarello 34'

Musgrave Park, Cork
Referee: Jérémy Rozier (France)

FB	15	Ben O'Connor
RW	14	Finn Treacy
OC	13	Wilhelm de Klerk
IC	12	Hugh Gavin
LW	11	Hugo McLaughlin	(substituted off) 66'
FH	10	Jack Murphy	(substituted off) 66'
SH	9	Oliver Coffey	(substituted off) 64'
N8	8	Luke Murphy	(substituted off) 61'
OF	7	Bryn Ward
BF	6	Joe Hopes
RL	5	Evan O'Connell (c)
LL	4	Alan Spicer	(substituted off) 50'
TP	3	Jacob Boyd	(substituted off) 50'
HK	2	Stephen Smyth	(substituted off) 50'
LP	1	Alex Usanov	(substituted off) 61'
Replacements:
HK	16	Danny Sheahan	(substituted on) 50'
PR	17	Ben Howard	(substituted on) 61'
PR	18	Patreece Bell	(substituted on) 50'
LK	19	Billy Corrigan	(substituted on) 50'
FL	20	Sean Edogbo	(substituted on) 61'
SH	21	Tadhg Brophy	(substituted on) 64'
FH	22	Sean Naughton	(substituted on) 66'
WG	23	Ethan Graham	(substituted on) 66'
Coach:
Richie Murphy

FB	15	Mirko Belloni
RW	14	Marco Scalabrin
OC	13	Federico Zanandrea
IC	12	Nicola Bozzo	(substituted off) 74'
LW	11	Lorenzo Elettri
FH	10	Martino Pucciarello	(substituted off) 63'
SH	9	Lorenzo Casilio	(substituted off) 74'
N8	8	Jacopo Botturi (c)
OF	7	Luca Bellucci	(substituted off) 74'
BF	6	Cesare Zucconi
RL	5	Piero Gritti
LL	4	Tommaso Redondi	(substituted off) 22'
TP	3	Marcos Gallorini	(substituted off) 74'
HK	2	Nicholas Gasperini	(substituted off) 64'
LP	1	Federico Pisani	(substituted off) 58'
Replacements:
HK	16	Valerio Siciliano	(substituted on) 64'
PR	17	Sergio Pelliccioli	(substituted on) 58'
PR	18	Davide Ascari	(substituted on) 74'
LK	19	Giacomo Milano	(substituted on) 22'
FL	20	Olmo D'Alessandro	(substituted on) 74'
SH	21	Mattia Jimenez	(substituted on) 74'
CR	22	Federico Fusari	(substituted on) 74'
FH	23	Patrick de Villiers	(substituted on) 63'
Coach:
Roberto Santamaria

9 February 2024
20:00

Scotland	14–29	France (1 BP)
Try: Lock 52'; Blyth-Lafferty 59'; Con: Coates (2) 53', 60'	Report	Try: Mousques 13'; Bosmorin 19'; Souverbie 30'; Castro 40'; Con: Desperes (3) 14', 20', 42'; Pen: Desperes 65'

Edinburgh Rugby Stadium, Edinburgh
Referee: Angus Mabey (New Zealand)

=== Week 3 ===
23 February 2024
19:15

(1 BP) Ireland	43–8	Wales
Try: Edogbo 17'; Gavin 39'; Walker 45'; Sheahan (2) 62', 66'; O'Connor 73'; Con: J. Murphy (4) 18', 40', 46', 63'; Naughton 74'; Pen: J. Murphy 7'	Report	Try: Davies 52'; Pen: Wilde 14'

Musgrave Park, Cork
Referee: Federico Vedovelli (Italy)

FB	15	Ben O'Connor
RW	14	Finn Treacy
OC	13	Wilhelm de Klerk
IC	12	Hugh Gavin	(substituted off) 64'
LW	11	Hugo McLaughlin
FH	10	Jack Murphy	(substituted off) 67'
SH	9	Oliver Coffey	(substituted off) 67'
N8	8	Luke Murphy	(substituted off) 67'
OF	7	Bryn Ward
BF	6	Sean Edogbo
RL	5	Evan O'Connell (c)
LL	4	Joe Hopes	(substituted off) 61'
TP	3	Patreece Bell	(substituted off) 51'
HK	2	Henry Walker	(substituted off) 54'
LP	1	Ben Howard	(substituted off) 11'
Replacements:
HK	16	Danny Sheahan	(substituted on) 54'
PR	17	Alex Usanov	(substituted on) 51'
PR	18	Emmett Calvey	(substituted on) 51'
LK	19	Billy Corrigan	(substituted on) 61'
FL	20	Tom Brigg	(substituted on) 67'
SH	21	Tadhg Brophy	(substituted on) 67'
FH	22	Sean Naughton	(substituted on) 67'
CR	23	Davy Colbert	(substituted on) 64'
Coach:
Richie Murphy

FB	15	Huw Anderson
RW	14	Harry Rees-Weldon		(substituted off) 54'
OC	13	Louie Hennessey
IC	12	Harri Ackerman (c)
LW	11	Walker Price
FH	10	Harri Wilde		(substituted off) 31'
SH	9	Ieuan Davies		(substituted off) 66'
N8	8	Lucas de la Rua
OF	7	Harry Beddall		(substituted off) 9' (substituted on) 18' (substituted off) 68' (substituted on) 75'
BF	6	Osian Thomas
RL	5	Nick Thomas (substituted off) 76'
LL	4	Jonny Green		(substituted off) 44'
TP	3	Sam Scott		(substituted off) 44'
HK	2	Harry Thomas	(yellow card) 8'	(substituted off) 57' (substituted on) 68' (substituted off) 75'
LP	1	Josh Morse		(substituted off) 47'
Replacements:
HK	16	Will Austin	(yellow card) 65'	(substituted on) 9' (substituted off) 57' (substituted on) 57'
PR	17	Jordan Morris		(substituted on) 47'
PR	18	Kian Hire		(substituted on) 44'
LK	19	Owen Conquer		(substituted on) 44'
FL	20	Will Plessis		(substituted on) 76'
SH	21	Rhodri Lewis		(substituted on) 66'
FH	22	Harri Ford		(substituted on) 31'
WG	23	Macs Page		(substituted on) 54'
Coach:
Richard Whiffin

23 February 2024
19:15

Scotland	17–30	England (1 BP)
Try: McVie 53'; Douglas 64'; Gwynn 75'; Con: Coates 54'	Report	Try: Wright 12'; Kerr 30'; Carnduff 46'; Michelow 58'; Con: Kerr (2) 13', 47'; Pen: Kerr (2) 3', 22'

Edinburgh Rugby Stadium, Edinburgh
Referee: Mike English (Wales)

23 February 2024
20:00

(1 BP) France	20–23	Italy
Try: Zamora 19'; Granell 44'; Boirie 61'; Con: Cotarmanac'h 62'; Pen: Cotarmanac'h 9'	Report	Try: Casilio 5'; Scalabrin 24'; Botturi 70'; Con: Pucciarello 71'; Pen: Pucciarello (2) 17', 42'

Stade Raoul-Barrière, Béziers
Referee: Ian Kenny (Scotland)

=== Week 4 ===
7 March 2024
19:45

Wales	12–45	France (1 BP)
Try: Morse 23'; Page 62'; Con: Price 62'	Report	Try: Mousques 9'; Quere Karaba 31'; Aouad 35', 39'; Tolofua 59'; Belaubre 73'; Con: Cotarmanac'h 10', 32', 36', 40'; Souverbie 60', 74'; Pen: Cotarmanac'h 43'

Cardiff Arms Park, Cardiff
Referee: Takehito Namekawa (Japan)

8 March 2024
19:15

(1 BP) Italy	47–14	Scotland
Try: Gritti (2) 7', 50'; Gasperini (2) 55', 59'; Belloni 62'; Scalabrin 77'; De Villiers 80'; Con: Pucciarello (6) 8', 51', 56', 61', 78', 81'	Report	Try: McVie 16'; Watson 25'; Con: Coates (2) 18', 26'

Stadio Comunale di Monigo, Treviso
Attendance: 5,000
Referee: Saba Abulashvili (Georgia)

8 March 2024
19:15

(1 BP) England	32–32	Ireland (1 BP)
Try: Carnduff 3'; Spencer 55'; James 68'; Waghorn 76'; Con: Kerr (3) 4', 69', 78'; Pen: Kerr (2) 11', 35'	Report	Try: Finn Treacy 15'; O'Connor 28'; McLaughlin 47'; Walker 63'; L. Murphy 80+2'; Con: J. Murphy 16'; Naughton 80+3'; Pen: J. Murphy 8'

Recreation Ground, Bath
Referee: Reuben Keane (Australia)

FB	15	Ben Redshaw
RW	14	Toby Cousins
OC	13	Ben Waghorn
IC	12	Sean Kerr
LW	11	Alex Wills	(substituted off) 40'
FH	10	Josh Bellamy	(substituted off) 48'
SH	9	Archie McParland
N8	8	Nathan Michelow
OF	7	Henry Pollock	(substituted off) 57'
BF	6	Finn Carnduff (c)
RL	5	Junior Kpoku
LL	4	Olamide Sodeke	(substituted off) 73'
TP	3	Billy Sela	(substituted off) 57'
HK	2	Jacob Oliver	(substituted off) 48'
LP	1	Asher Opoku-Fordjour	(substituted off) 57'
Replacements:
HK	16	James Isaccs	(substituted on) 48'
PR	17	Scott Kirk	(substituted on) 57'
PR	18	Jimmy Halliwell	(substituted on) 57'
LK	19	Zach Carr	(substituted on) 73'
FL	20	Kane James	(substituted on) 57'
SH	21	Ben Douglas
WG	22	George Makepeace-Cubitt	(substituted on) 40'
FH	23	Oliver Spencer	(substituted on) 48'
Coach:
Mark Mapletoft

FB	15	Ben O'Connor
RW	14	Finn Treacy
OC	13	Wilhelm de Klerk
IC	12	Hugh Gavin
LW	11	Hugo McLaughlin
FH	10	Jack Murphy	(substituted off) 78'
SH	9	Oliver Coffey
N8	8	Luke Murphy
OF	7	Bryn Ward
BF	6	Joe Hopes
RL	5	Evan O'Connell (c)
LL	4	Alan Spicer	(substituted off) 60'
TP	3	Jacob Boyd	(substituted off) 62'
HK	2	Danny Sheahan	(substituted off) 62'
LP	1	Alex Usanov	(substituted off) 72'
Replacements:
HK	16	Henry Walker	(substituted on) 62'
PR	17	Ben Howard	(substituted on) 72'
PR	18	Patreece Bell	(substituted on) 62'
LK	19	Billy Corrigan
FL	20	Sean Edogbo	(substituted on) 60'
SH	21	Tadhg Brophy
FH	22	Sean Naughton	(substituted on) 78'
CR	23	Davy Colbert
Coach:
Richie Murphy

=== Week 5 ===
15 March 2024
19:00

(1 BP) Ireland	36–0	Scotland
Try: McLaughlin 20'; O'Connell 59'; Sheahan (2) 70', 80+2'; Edogbo 76'; Con: J. Murphy (4) 21', 71', 77', 80+3'; Pen: J. Murphy 49'	Report

Musgrave Park, Cork
Referee: Takehito Namekawa (Japan)

FB	15	Ben O'Connor
RW	14	Finn Treacy
OC	13	Wilhelm de Klerk	(substituted off) 71'
IC	12	Hugh Gavin	(substituted off) 58'
LW	11	Hugo McLaughlin
FH	10	Jack Murphy
SH	9	Oliver Coffey	(substituted off) 74'
N8	8	Luke Murphy	(substituted off) 43'
OF	7	Bryn Ward	(substituted off) 60'
BF	6	Sean Edogbo
RL	5	Evan O'Connell (c)
LL	4	Joe Hopes
TP	3	Jacob Boyd	(substituted off) 48'
HK	2	Henry Walker	(substituted off) 60'
LP	1	Alex Usanov	(substituted off) 65'
Replacements:
HK	16	Danny Sheahan	(substituted on) 60'
PR	17	Ben Howard	(substituted on) 65'
PR	18	Patreece Bell	(substituted on) 48'
LK	19	Billy Corrigan	(substituted on) 60'
FL	20	James McKillop	(substituted on) 43'
SH	21	Tadhg Brophy	(substituted on) 74'
FH	22	Sean Naughton	(substituted on) 71'
CR	23	Davy Colbert	(substituted on) 56'
Coach:
Richie Murphy

FB	15	Jack Brown		(substituted off) 60'
RW	14	Finlay Doyle
OC	13	Johnny Ventisei
IC	12	Findlay Thomson		(substituted off) 62'
LW	11	Geordie Gwynn (c)
FH	10	Andy McLean
SH	9	Hector Patterson		(substituted off) 60'
N8	8	Tom Currie
OF	7	Freddie Douglas
BF	6	Jonny Morris		(substituted off) 60'
RL	5	Ruaraidh Hart (c)
LL	4	Euan McVie		(substituted off) 62'
TP	3	Callum Norrie		(substituted off) 68'
HK	2	Jerry Blyth-Lafferty		(substituted off) 62'
LP	1	Callum Smyth		(substituted off) 24'
Replacements:
HK	16	Marcus Brogan		(substituted on) 66'
PR	17	Robbie Deans		(substituted on) 24'
PR	18	Ryan Whitefield		(substituted on) 66'
LK	19	Archie Clarke		(substituted on) 62'
FL	20	Monroe Job	(yellow card) 64'	(substituted on) 60'
SH	21	Eric Davey		(substituted on) 60'
FH	22	Finn Douglas		(substituted on) 60'
CR	23	Kerr Yule		(substituted on) 62'
Coach:
Kenny Murray

15 March 2024
19:30

(1 BP) Wales	27–15	Italy
Try: Thomas 46'; Beddall 59'; Stone 67'; Young 71'; Con: Ford (2) 60', 68'; Pen: Ford 76'	Report	Try: Gallorini 15'; Pen: Pucciarello 3'

Cardiff Arms Park, Cardiff
Referee: Reuben Keane (Australia)

15 March 2024
20:00

(1 BP) France	31–45	England (1 BP)
Try: Ferte 12'; Gourgues 24'; Carbonneau 26'; Castro 45'; Con: Reus (4) 13', 25', 27', 46'; Pen: Reus 56'	Report	Try: Redshaw 1'; Isaacs (2) 36', 42'; Jones 47'; Pollock 58'; Halliwell 69'; Con: Kerr (3) 37', 43', 69'; Makepeace-Cubitt 59'

Stade du Hameau, Pau
Referee: Federico Vedovelli (Italy)
