= Joe Williams (judge) =

New Zealand judge

The Honourable Sir Joe Williams KNZM
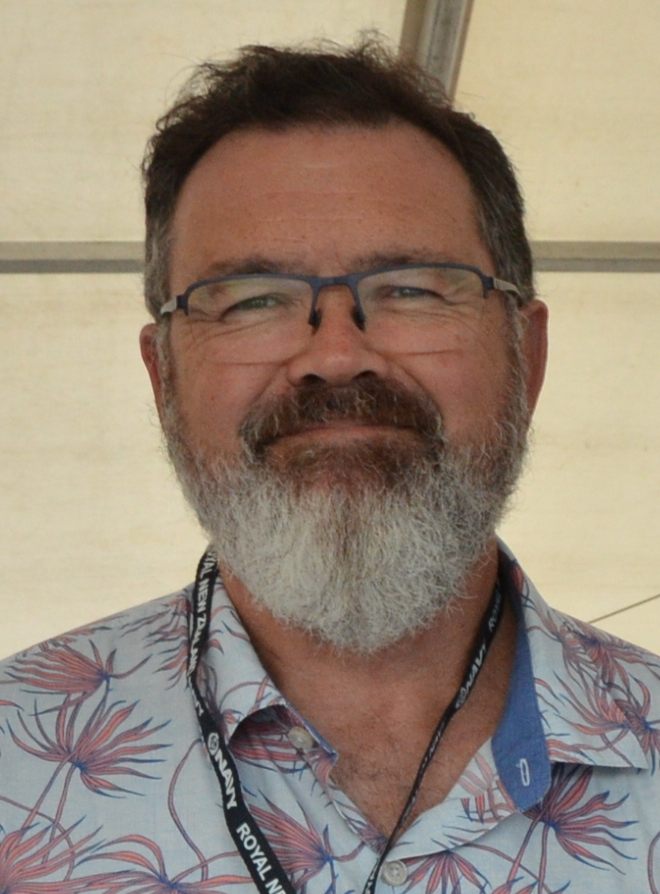
- Williams in 2019

Justice of the Supreme Court
- Incumbent
- Assumed office 2 May 2019

Justice of the Court of Appeal
- In office 20 December 2017 – 1 May 2019

Personal details
- Born: Joseph Victor Williams; 1961 (age 64–65)
- Education: Victoria University of Wellington; University of British Columbia

Sir Joseph Victor Williams KNZM (born 1961) is a New Zealand lawyer and judge. He has been a justice of the Supreme Court of New Zealand since 2019, and is the first Māori person appointed to the role.

== Early life ==
Williams was brought up in Hastings by a great-uncle and a great-aunt alongside his cousins. He is of Ngāti Pūkenga and Te Arawa descent. By 14, he was working in the freezing works to contribute to the family income.

Williams won a scholarship and was educated at Lindisfarne College. He went on to study at Victoria University of Wellington, where he first studied Māori language and then law. He graduated in 1986 with a Bachelor of Laws degree from Victoria, and later with a Master of Laws with first-class honours in indigenous rights law from the University of British Columbia. He had worked as a junior law lecturer at Victoria University before studying his master's degree.

In the 1980s, Williams was a musician as a member of the Ngāhiwi Apanui-led band Aotearoa, known for their bilingual Pacific reggae song "Maranga Ake Ai" (1985).

== Legal career ==
Williams contributed to the legal team for the 1985 Treaty of Waitangi claim which led to the adoption of te reo Māori as an official language of New Zealand. In 1988 he joined Kensington Swan, where he specialised in Māori issues and environmental law. He became a partner at Kensington Swan in 1992, leaving in 1994 to co‑found Walters Williams & Co.

In 1999, at the age of 38, he became the youngest person to be appointed Chief Judge of the Māori Land Court. In 2004, Williams was appointed the Chairperson of the Waitangi Tribunal after acting in that role for several years.

In 2008, he was appointed a Justice of the High Court of New Zealand. In 2017, he became the first Te Reo Māori speaker appointed to the Court of Appeal. He was appointed to the Supreme Court of New Zealand in May 2019, succeeding William Young. Williams is the first Māori person to be appointed to the Supreme Court.

Williams is a former Vice-President of the Māori Law Society, and a fellow of the International Academy of Trial Lawyers. He has written about tikanga Māori and New Zealand law. His future vision for New Zealand law is for a time "when tikanga Māori fuses with New Zealand’s common law tradition to form a hybrid law of Aotearoa that could be developed by judges, case by base." He gave the Ivan Kwok lecture in 2022 where he set out his views on the government's Treaty of Waitangi partnerships with Māori and the struggle of government to give effect to its treaty commitments.

== Awards and honours ==
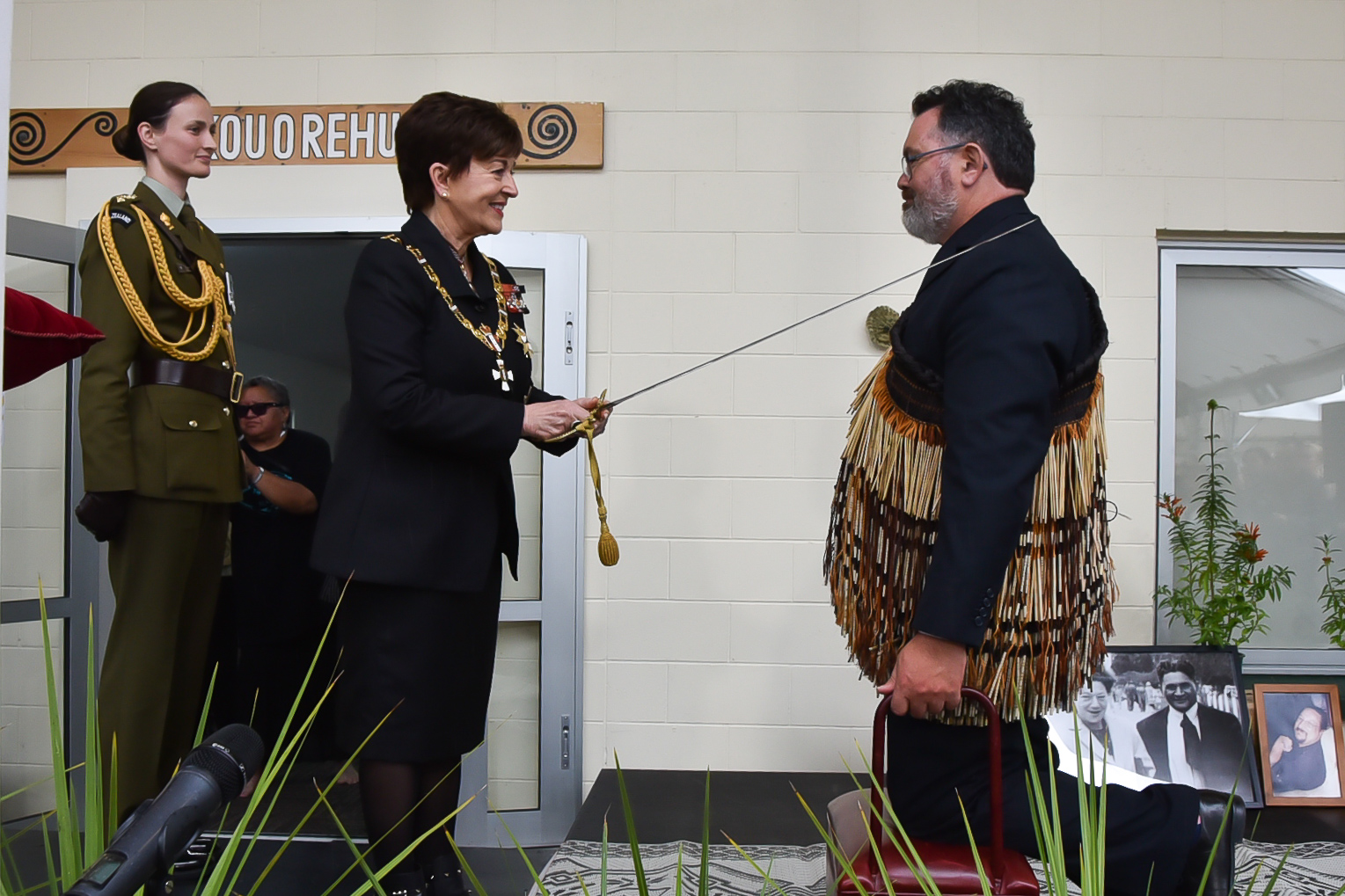
Williams' investiture as a Knight Companion of the New Zealand Order of Merit by the governor-general, Dame Patsy Reddy, at Manaia Marae on 10 April 2021

In the 2020 New Year Honours, he was appointed a Knight Companion of the New Zealand Order of Merit, for services to the judiciary. His investiture ceremony took place in April 2021 at his home marae in the Coromandel town of Manaia.

== Selected publications ==
- Williams, Joe. (July 2001). "The Māori Land Court: A Separate Legal System?" New Zealand Centre for Public Law. https://www.wgtn.ac.nz/public-law/publications/occasional-papers/pdfs/JWilliams-web-paper.pdf
- Williams, Joe. (June 2008). "Confessions of a Native Judge: Reflections on the role of transitional justice in the transformation of indigeneity." Native Title Research Unit. Archived at http://classic.austlii.edu.au/au/journals/LRightsLaws/2008/3.pdf.
