= Ben Redshaw =

English rugby union player

- Full name: Ben Redshaw
- Born: 10 January 2005 (age 21) Bramhope, Leeds, England
- Height: 185 cm (6 ft 1 in)
- Weight: 80 kg (176 lb; 12 st 8 lb)
- School: Sedbergh School

Rugby union career
- Position(s): Centre, Wing, Full-back
- Current team: Gloucester Rugby
Youth career
- West Park Leeds RUFC
- 2019–2023: Newcastle Falcons
Senior career
Years	Team	Apps	(Points)
2023–2025	Newcastle Falcons	23	(20)
2023	→ Tynedale RFC	2	(0)
2025–	Gloucester	17	(65)
- Correct as of 14 Nov 2026
International career
Years	Team	Apps	(Points)
2021–2023	England U18	8	(10)
2023	England U19	1	(0)
2024–2025	England U20	10	(15)
2025–	England A	1	(5)
- Correct as of 15 November 2025

Ben Redshaw (born 10 January 2005) is an English professional rugby union player who plays mainly at full-back for Premiership club Gloucester Rugby.

== Club career ==
Born in Leeds, Redshaw began his career at local side West Park Leeds RUFC before joining the Newcastle Falcons Academy at the age of fourteen. He joined the senior Academy in 2023 after completing his studies at Sedbergh School, where he also played rugby, signing a two-year contract.

Redshaw made his debut for Newcastle coming off the bench against Bedford Blues on the 15 September 2023, before making his first start a week later in a win over Sale Sharks in the Premiership Rugby Cup. His first league start came in the opening round of the 2023–24 Premiership Rugby season in a loss against Bath. He has also represented Tynedale RFC, debuting off the bench against Otley RUFC.

On 22 April 2025 it was confirmed that Redshaw would leave Newcastle to join Premiership rivals Gloucester ahead of the 2025–26 season.

== International career ==
Redshaw played for England under-18s through two Six Nations campaigns and a tour to South Africa, captaining the side on numerous occasions. In April 2023 he was called up to play for the England under-19s side featuring in a narrow loss against Italy. Later that year during the 2023 Rugby World Cup, Redshaw travelled to France to spend a week training with the England senior squad.

Redshaw made his debut for England under-20 playing in a warm up match against Bath Academy ahead of the 2024 Six Nations. He started all five of their games during the tournament and scored a try in the last round as England defeated France to win the title.

Redshaw was included in the squad for the 2024 World Rugby U20 Championship and scored a try in their opening pool fixture against Argentina. An injury sustained in the semi-final victory over Ireland ruled him out of the final which England won to become Junior World Champions.

After missing the 2025 Six Nations Under 20s Championship due to injury, in June 2025 Redshaw was named in the England squad for the 2025 World Rugby U20 Championship. He scored a try in their opening game against Scotland as England ultimately finished sixth. Later that year in November 2025, Redshaw scored the winning try for England A in a victory over Spain.

== Honours ==
=== England U20 ===
- World Rugby U20 Championship
  - (gold) Champion (1): 2024
- 2024 Six Nations Under 20s Championship
  - (gold) Champion (1): 2024

=== Individual ===
- Newcastle Falcons Academy player of the season: 2023–24
- RPA's Male 15 Under 23 MVP: December 2024
- Newcastle Falcons Try of the Season: 2023–24
