= Ben Waghorn =

English rugby union player (born 2004)

- Born: 2 April 2004 (age 22) Sutton, London, England
- Height: 191 cm (6 ft 3 in)
- Weight: 98 kg (216 lb)
- School: The John Fisher School

Rugby union career
- Position: Centre
- Current team: Harlequins
Senior career
Years	Team	Apps	(Points)
2022–	Harlequins	11	(15)
2023–2024	→ London Scottish (loan)	18	(25)
- Correct as of 24 March 2025
International career
Years	Team	Apps	(Points)
2023–2024	England U20	10	(15)
- Correct as of 19 July 2024

Ben Waghorn (born 2 April 2004) is an English professional rugby union footballer who plays at Centre for Premiership Rugby side Harlequins.

== Early life ==
From South London, Waghorn attended John Fisher School and played club rugby union for Chipstead. He played both rugby union and rugby league as a youngster. He played league for Elmridge Eagles and was in the academy at London Broncos before concentrating on rugby union with Harlequins from the U17 level, and joined their senior academy ahead of the 2022-23 season.

== Club career ==
Waghorn made his debut for Harlequins in the Premiership Rugby Cup and also featured on loan for London Scottish in 2023.

In January 2025, he made his Premiership Rugby debut for Harlequins replacing Luke Northmore as they beat Newcastle Falcons 38–14 at Kingston Park. Later that month he made his first Champions Cup appearance coming off the bench in a defeat against Toulon. In February 2025, he scored his first try for the club during a 32–10 victory over Ealing Trailfinders in the Premiership Cup. In March 2025, he scored his first Premiership try for the club 23–12 during an away victory over Saracens. This was their first away win in the league against their rivals since 2012 and the first time they have done the double over them since the 2008–09 season.

== International career ==
Waghorn scored two tries for England U20 against Wales during the 2023 Six Nations Under 20s Championship. The following year he scored a try in a draw against Ireland during the penultimate round of the 2024 Six Nations and then started in the last fixture which England won at Stade du Hameau to claim the title.

Waghorn was included in the England squad for the 2024 World Rugby U20 Championship and started in the final as England defeated France at Cape Town Stadium to become junior world champions.

== Honours ==
England U20

- World Rugby Under 20 Championship
  - (gold) Champion (1): 2024
- Six Nations Under 20s Championship
  - (gold) Champion (1): 2024
