= Darryl Stevens =

Darryl Stevens MNZM

Darryl Maurice Stevens MNZM is a civil society leader from New Zealand. He is an advocate for the role of the Commonwealth of Nations as a global community. He is the Pacific Regional Coordinator of the Royal Commonwealth Society and was the founding Chair of the Board of Commonwealth Youth New Zealand.

In the 2013 Queen's Birthday Honours, Stevens was appointed as a Member of the New Zealand Order of Merit for services to youth and the Commonwealth.
