= Evan O'Connell =

Irish rugby union player (born 2004)

- Born: 4 May 2004 (age 22) Limerick
- Height: 2.03 m (6 ft 8 in)
- Weight: 118 kg (18.6 st; 260 lb)
- School: Castletroy College
- Notable relative: Paul O'Connell (uncle)

Rugby union career
- Position: Lock
Amateur team(s)
Years	Team	Apps	(Points)
- UL Bohemians
- Young Munster
Senior career
Years	Team	Apps	(Points)
2024-	Munster	15	(5)
- Correct as of 31 October 2026
International career
Years	Team	Apps	(Points)
2023	Ireland U19		
2023-2024	Ireland U20	16	(15)
2025 -	Ireland A	2	(0)
- Correct as of 30 January 2026

Evan O'Connell (born 4 May 2004) is an Irish professional rugby union footballer who plays for Munster Rugby.He also represents Young Munster Rfc.His preferred position is lock.

== Early life ==
From County Limerick, O'Connell attended Castletroy College and played for the Munster U-18 Schools team at the start of the 2021–22 season as well as captaining Castletroy in the Munster Schools Boys Senior Cup that year.

== Club career ==
O'Connell joined the Munster Rugby Academy ahead of the 2022–23 season and also played in the All-Ireland League for Young Munster having previously also played for UL Bohemians.

In November 2024, O'Connell made his senior United Rugby Championship debut for Munster at home against Emirates Lions. In December 2024, he made his debut for Munster in the European Rugby Champions Cup in the Pool 3 opening fixture against Stade Français Paris at Thomond Park. In 2025, he signed a two-year contract with Munster and moved from the senior academy to the first team squad.

== International career ==
O'Connell played for Ireland U18 in the 2022 U18 Six Nations Festival. He was captain of Ireland U19s for two matches against France U19 in April 2023 and played in the Ireland national under-20 rugby union team that won the grand slam at the 2023 Six Nations Under 20s Championship. The following year, he captained the team at the 2024 U20 Six Nations, and the 2024 World Rugby U20 Championship in South Africa. He later travelled to South Africa in October 2024 with Emerging Ireland.

In 2025, he was called up to the Irish Wolfhounds squad for their match against Spain during the 2025 November internationals, and was subsequently named in the starting XV.

== Personal life ==
His father Justin played as a lock for UL Bohemians, where he later coached the under-20 side. He is the nephew of former Ireland rugby captain Paul O'Connell.
