= Harri Ackerman =

Welsh rugby union player (born 2004)

- Born: 21 December 2004 (age 21) Cardiff
- Height: 185 cm (6 ft 1 in)
- Weight: 93 kg (205 lb)
- School: Coleg Gwent

Rugby union career
- Position: Centre
- Current team: Dragons
Youth career
- Newbridge RFC
Senior career
Years	Team	Apps	(Points)
2022–	Newport RFC	16	(10)
2022	Cross Keys RFC		
2023–	Dragons	11	(0)
International career
Years	Team	Apps	(Points)
2022	Wales U18		
2023–2024	Wales U20	7	(5)

Harri Ackerman (born 21 December 2004) is a Welsh rugby union player who plays as a centre for Dragons RFC.

== Club career ==
=== Youth and amateur rugby ===
Ackerman played youth rugby for Newbridge RFC and represented Wales in Rugby league at U17 level. After returning to rugby union, Ackerman was part of the Dragons Academy, and captained the U18 team as they won the Regional Age Grade tournament in 2022. While part of the academy, Ackerman played for both Cross Keys RFC and Newport RFC. On his Cross Keys debut, Ackerman scored two tries, and was named as Man of the Match. Ackerman suffered a shoulder injury in the 2022–23 Cup Final against Cardiff RFC, which ruled him out until December 2023.

Ackerman attended Coleg Gwent, and played for their rugby team.

=== Dragons ===
Upon returning to fitness, Ackerman made his debut for the Dragons on 9 December 2023, in the Challenge Cup match against Oyonnax. His first start came the following month, on 1 January 2024 against the Scarlets, making his United Rugby Championship debut.

On 2 April 2024, Ackerman signed a three-year contract extension with the Dragons.

After missing the start of the season due to injury, Ackerman was named to play for Newport RFC on 7 December 2024, but the match was postponed due to Storm Darragh.

== International career ==
=== Wales U18 and U20 ===
Ackerman was named as captain of Wales U18 for the 2022 Under-18 festival.

In 2023, Ackerman progressed to the U20 team, featuring in the 2023 Six Nations Under 20s Championship. Ackerman missed the Summer Series due to a shoulder injury.

Ackerman was named as captain for the 2024 Six Nations Under 20s Championship. Ackerman scored his first try for Wales in the opening win over Scotland, and had another try ruled out.

During the match against France, Ackerman broke his leg, and was ruled out for the remainder of the season.
