= Aaron Hape =

Fellow of the Royal Society of Arts

Aaron Hape FRSA
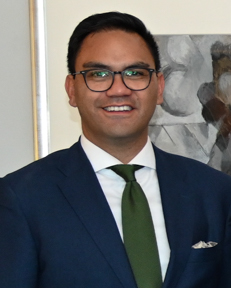
- Hape in 2026
- Education: Victoria University of Wellington; Palmerston North Boys' High School; Southwell School
- Relatives: Frank Barclay (great-grandfather); Wattie Barclay (grand-uncle)
- Awards: New Zealander of the Year Local Hero Medal; Sir Āpirana Ngata Memorial Scholarship

Aaron William Hape is a New Zealand public policy and governance leader. He is a Fellow of the Royal Society of Arts and, in 2017, became the first person of Māori descent to be elected an Associate Fellow of the Royal Commonwealth Society.

== Background and education ==
Hape was raised in Dannevirke and received his early education at Southwell School and Palmerston North Boys' High School. He later studied at Victoria University of Wellington, where he completed a Bachelor of Arts.

He is an alumnus of the United States Department of State's International Visitor Leadership Program.

Hape is of Māori descent and is affiliated with the iwi Ngāti Kahungunu ki Wairarapa Tāmaki nui-a-Rua.

His great-grandfather was New Zealand rugby league footballer Frank Barclay and his grand-uncle was Wattie Barclay, a captain of the New Zealand Māori Rugby Team and a military officer

== Personal life ==
Hape is a supporter of constitutional monarchy in New Zealand and has served as an ambassador for the New Zealand Women's Refuge.

== Career ==
=== Governance and public roles ===
Hape has held governance and advisory roles across New Zealand's public, cultural, and not-for-profit sectors. He serves as Chair of the Te Papa Foundation, the philanthropic arm of the Museum of New Zealand Te Papa Tongarewa.

His governance work also includes supporting cultural organistions, including the Dowse Foundation and the Shakespeare Globe Centre New Zealand, reflecting a broader contribution to the development and sustainability of arts and cultural institutions in New Zealand.

=== Commonwealth engagement ===
Hape is the founder of Commonwealth Youth New Zealand and served as its inaugural Executive Director from 2014 to 2017.

During this period, he was appointed to the advisory panel for the Queen’s Young Leaders Award, an initiative established as part of Queen Elizabeth II’s Diamond Jubilee legacy to recognise young leaders across the Commonwealth.

In 2015, he was appointed by Commonwealth Secretary-General Kamalesh Sharma to the Commonwealth Observer Group for the Trinidad and Tobago general election. The group, led by Sir Paul Tovua, concluded that the election met Commonwealth standards and was conducted in a “credible and transparent manner”.

In that same year, Hape stated that the Commonwealth was "in urgent need of a renewed purpose". Ahead of the 2015 Commonwealth Heads of Government Meeting he called for the appointment of a Secretary-General with broader experience, arguing that the role required leadership capable of unifying the aspirations of Commonwealth member societies.

In 2016, Hape raised concerns about the rule of law in Maldives following findings by the Commonwealth Ministerial Action Group that democratic standards were deteriorating. Responding to the arrest of the then-opposition leader Sheikh Imran Abdulla, he stated that the government had "reacted with a show of force rather than take steps to rectify these very serious issues with the rule of law and transparency". The Maldives withdrew from the Commonwealth in October 2016 and rejoined in February 2020.

=== Non-state diplomacy and international engagement ===
In 2016, Hape was selected to participate in the inaugural Timor Leste-New Zealand Dialogue - known as the "Timor Talks". The dialogue aimed to strengthen cultural and diplomatic ties between the two countries and built on the Asia New Zealand Foundation's Track II diplomacy programme.

In 2019, he founded the Wellington hub of the Global Shapers Community, an initiative of the World Economic Forum focused on community-led social impact projects.

== Recognition and awards ==
Hape was awarded the Sir Āpirana Ngata Memorial Scholarship in 2010. In 2014, he was named as one of the inaugural recipients of the Minister for Youth Affairs Leadership Award.

In recognition of his work in the Commonwealth and community sector, he received a New Zealander of the Year Local Hero Medal and was named as a finalist for the Young Wellingtonian of the Year Award in 2015.

In 2017, he was elected as a Fellow of the Royal Society of Arts and as an Associate Fellow of the Royal Commonwealth Society.

== Bibliography ==
- Bureau of Educational and Cultural Affairs. (2019). Advancing an Open, Reliable and Secure Digital Economy - A Multi-Regional Project. United States Department of State.
- Baker, Juno (ed.) (2017). A Year of Leading Change. University of Cambridge Institute of Continuing Education.
- Commonwealth Governance and Peace Directorate (2015). Report of the Commonwealth Observer Group for the 2015 Trinidad and Tobago Parliamentary Elections. Commonwealth Secretariat.
- The Queen's Young Leaders Award. (2015). A Report on Progress 2012 - 2014. The Queen Elizabeth Diamond Jubilee Trust.
- Browne, Richard. (ed.). (2010). The Palmerstonian (Vol. 104). Palmerston North Boys’ High School.
- Browne, Richard. (ed.). (2009). The Palmerstonian (Vol. 23). Palmerston North Boys’ High School.
