= Commonwealth Youth New Zealand =

Youth organisation

- Abbreviation: CYNZ
- Formation: 2014
- Type: Non-government organisation
- Headquarters: Wellington, New Zealand
- Location: National
- Members: Open membership
- Patron: Sir Anand Satyanand
- Founder: Aaron Hape
- Chair of the Board: Marek Townley
- President: Zsuzsi Hazag
- Website: commonwealthyouth.org.nz

Commonwealth Youth New Zealand is a youth-led nonprofit that educates young New Zealanders about the Commonwealth and the values of the Charter of the Commonwealth. It provides opportunities for young people to develop their leadership skills in an international context by hosting national and regional events for secondary students.

== Events ==
=== National Student Commonwealth Heads of Government Meeting ===
Students are appointed as a head of government or foreign minister of a Commonwealth member state, or a special envoy from an observer organisation and participate in a simulation of a Commonwealth Heads of Government Meeting. Delegations usually consist of two students from each participating school. They debate a host of topics, from human rights to climate change, bringing the perspective of the government they represent.

Delegates also participate in a model Commonwealth Ministerial Action Group scenario, where they are tasked with resolving a burgeoning conflict or crisis situation involving member states.

==== Secretary-General ====
Delegates can also put their names forward to be considered for the role of National Student Commonwealth Heads of Government Meeting Secretary-General. The successful applicant will, as the real Secretary-General of the Commonwealth does, chair all the conference plenary sessions, encourage delegates to form resolutions on the points of debate, and present an opening and closing address to assembled delegations, invited guests, and Commonwealth High Commissioners accredited to New Zealand. The Commonwealth Secretary-General is responsible to all heads of government and plays a key role in the direction of the Student Commonwealth Heads of Government Meeting and agenda issues.

==== Media delegation ====
The Student Commonwealth Heads of Government Meeting press corps represents the role the media play at international conferences. They conduct interviews and press conferences with country delegates and produce written and cinematic content about the Student Commonwealth Heads of Government Meeting proceedings.

=== Common Leaders' Day ===
Common Leaders' Day is a one-day leadership development programme for senior high school students. Participants are immersed in a range of workshops aimed at equipping them with practical skills they can use to define their personal leadership styles. They learn about the importance and purpose of the Commonwealth and its values in an ever-changing world.

== Structure ==
=== Executive Committee ===
The executive committee manages Commonwealth Youth New Zealand's operations, including delivering its events and educational programmes. Members are appointed by the board. The president of the committee is currently Zsuzsi Hazag.

=== Board ===
Commonwealth Youth New Zealand's board provides governs the organisation and provides mentoring and strategic direction to the executive committee. Board members are elected by the membership at annual general meetings. The board is currently chaired by Marek Townley.

=== Patron and Founder ===
Aaron Hape founded Commonwealth Youth New Zealand in 2014 and served as the inaugural executive director (now president) until 2017.

In 2017, Sir Anand Satyanand was appointed Commonwealth Youth New Zealand's patron. Satyanand is a former judge and Governor-General of New Zealand. Following his tenure as Governor-General he was appointed as chair of the Commonwealth Foundation.

=== Leadership ===
No.	Leader	Leader	Term start	Term end	Chair of the Board	Patron
1	Executive Director	Aaron Hape	2014	2017	Darryl Stevens	Office created in 2017
2	Executive Director	Brad Olsen	2017	2018	Darryl Stevens	Sir Anand Satyanand
3	Executive Director	Louise Kendall	2018	2018	Darryl Stevens	Sir Anand Satyanand
4	Executive Director	Marek Townley	2018	2019	Darryl Stevens	Sir Anand Satyanand
5	Executive Director	Eva Maffey	2019	2021	Marek Townley	Sir Anand Satyanand
6	Executive Committee Chair	Kaya Selby	2021	2024	Marek Townley	Sir Anand Satyanand
7	President	Zsuzsi Hazag	2024	Present	Marek Townley	Sir Anand Satyanand
