= Jack Stanaway =

NZ Maori international rugby league footballer & referee

Personal information
- Full name: John James Stanaway
- Born: 8 October 1873 New Zealand
- Died: 23 December 1931 (aged 58)

Playing information
Representative
Years	Team	Pld	T	G	FG	P
1908	New Zealand Māori	8	6	1	0	20
1909	Auckland	2	0	0	0	0

Refereeing information
Years	Competition	Apps
1911	Auckland Rugby League
1911	Internationals
- Relatives: Alex Stanaway (brother)

John James "Jack" Stanaway (8 October 1873 – 23 December 1931), also known as Hone Haira, was a New Zealand rugby league player who represented New Zealand Māori and was an international test referee. His brother, Alex Stanaway, played rugby league for New Zealand.

== Rugby league career ==
Stanaway breaking away for Auckland v Wellington on October 9, 1909 at Victoria Park.

Alongside his brother Alex, Stanaway was part of the 1908 New Zealand Māori rugby league tour of Australia. They actually played against each other on July 10 when Alex was part of the New Zealand Māori side which played Auckland (who Jack was representing) at Victoria Park. Jack was on the winning team when Auckland won 21-14 with the Māori team about to depart for their tour of Australia.

At Ponsonby United's first AGM on 30 July 1909, Stanaway was elected to the club's executive alongside James Carlaw (the first chairman), Charles Dunning and Arthur Carlaw.

Stanaway became a referee in the Auckland Rugby League competition. On 25 June, during a club game, Stanaway sent off Albert Asher. The rest of the City Rovers side walked off in support of Asher. Asher became the first player to face the ARL judiciary, who cautioned him.

During the 1910 Great Britain Lions tour of New Zealand, Stanaway controlled the Lions matches against Auckland and New Zealand.

In 1911 he helped set up the Otahuhu Rovers club, becoming their first chairman.

== Later years ==
Stanaway died on 23 December 1931.
