= Dalloz (surname) =

Dalloz is a surname. Notable people with the surname include:

- Adeline Dalloz (1824–1910), French ballerina
- Désiré Dalloz (1795–1869), French jurist, politician and publisher
- Marie-Christine Dalloz (born 1958), French politician

== See also ==
- Dallow (surname)
