= Ross Dallow =

New Zealand police officer (1937–2020)

Ross Dallow MNZM QPM JP
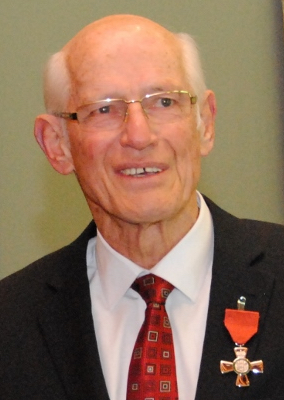
- Dallow in 2013
- Born: Ross Philip Dallow; 4 December 1937
- Died: 20 July 2020 (aged 82)
- Occupation: Police officer
- Relatives: Graeme Dallow (brother); Simon Dallow (son); Matthew Dallow (son); Ernie Asher (grandfather); Albert Asher (great-uncle); Jack Asher (great-uncle)

Ross Philip Dallow (4 December 1937 – 20 July 2020) was a senior member of the New Zealand Police who had an important influence on improved race relations in Auckland. He was also an Auckland local government politician.

== Early life and family ==
Dallow spent his childhood in Auckland and was educated at St Peter's College, Auckland. He was the younger brother of Graeme Dallow and the father of Simon and Matthew Dallow. He was the grandson of Ernie Asher (Te Keepa Pouwhiuwhiu), a rugby union and rugby league football player of the early 1900s.

In 1956, Dallow won the New Zealand under-19 men's discus throw title, representing Auckland, with a throw of 134 ft 8 in (41.05 m).

== Police career ==
Dallow was a significant personality in the management of race relations in the Auckland Police District in the 1970s. As inspector, he was originally in charge of the task force that Graeme Dallow had set up as a temporary expedient to deal with street disorder among the large Māori and Pacific communities that had migrated to South Auckland. Later Ross Dallow headed the Community Relations Co-ordinators for five years. As leader of both units, Dallow worked on improving communications with Māori and Pasifika leaders. For example, he took Assistant Race Relations Conciliator Pita Sharples out with the Task Force one night to show him the problems on the street, and won the influential support of the Conciliator's office.

In 1976 Dallow promoted the expansion of police education programmes in secondary schools. Hitherto such programmes were aimed at acquainting pupils with the role of the police in society and creating a sense that the police were trustworthy and approachable. Dallow believed that the police had to introduce more sophisticated programmes because pupils were acquiring knowledge of law-related issues from "radical and civil liberties types who enter the schools under the guise of 'liberal studies' ".

After he became a superintendent, Dallow, in the face of the reluctance of many of his colleagues, spent much of his time addressing opinion-formers and cultivating a positive relationship with the media in relation to race relations and other police issues in Auckland. Dallow was District Commander in West Auckland and the length of his police career was 36 years.

In 1979, Dallow was one of the police team who served at the mortuary at Auckland University School of Medicine, where bodies recovered in the aftermath of the crash of Air New Zealand Flight 901 on Mount Erebus were taken when they were returned to New Zealand. He was subsequently awarded the New Zealand Special Service Medal (Erebus).

== Local government ==
Dallow was a member of the Waitakere City Council from 1992 to 2010. In 2010 he was elected as an inaugural member of the Henderson-Massey Local Board. During the election campaign, Dallow was criticised for his use of police colours on his election placards and his comments on the "browning" of New Zealand at a West Auckland citizenship ceremony. Dallow did not stand again for the board after his term expired in 2013.

Dallow was also a member of the Waitakere Licensing Trust from 1992 to 2016, including as chair of the trust board from 1995 to 2004.

== Athletics coaching and administration ==
Dallow was involved in athletics as a coach for over 30 years, enjoying considerable success. Athletes he trained set eight New Zealand records and won 31 national titles, and he was the manager of the Auckland team to the national track and field championships on many occasions. Serving on the committee of the Waitakere City Athletic Club, Dallow was instrumental in the fund-raising effort to build The Trusts Arena and Douglas Track and Field in Henderson, and his contributions were recognised with the West Auckland Legacy Award at the 2015 Sport Waitakere Excellence Awards.

== Honours ==
Dallow was awarded the Queen's Police Medal in the 1980 Queen's Birthday Honours. In the 2013 Queen's Birthday Honours, he was appointed a Member of the New Zealand Order of Merit, for services to the community.

== Death ==
Dallow died on 20 July 2020, aged 82.
