= Laurent Simutoga =

- Born: December 8, 1987 (age 38) Noumea
- Height: 1.86 m (6 ft 1 in)
- Weight: 113 kg (249 lb)

Rugby union career
- Position: Prop
Senior career
Years	Team	Apps	(Points)
2007-2009	Paris	3	(0)
2010-2011	La Rochelle	3	(0)
Provincial / State sides
Years	Team	Apps	(Points)
- Hawke's Bay Academy
International career
Years	Team	Apps	(Points)
2007	France U-21		

Laurent Simutoga (born December 8, 1987) is a New Caledonian rugby union prop from Wallis and Futuna, in the South Pacific. He played for Paris and La Rochelle in the French Top 14 before an injury forced his early retirement from professional sport. He was educated at Lindisfarne College in New Zealand in 2005–06, during which time he played for Hawke's Bay Academy. Before moving to France, Simutoga also represented Hawke's Bay in the Under 18 and Under 20 age groups. In 2007 he represented France in the Under 21 age group.

== Personal life ==
Born December 8, 1987, in Noumea, New Caledonia, Simutoga is the maternal grandson of Pelenato Fuluhea, who served as King of Wallis and Futuna between 1947 and 1950. He completed his secondary education at Lindisfarne College in New Zealand after being awarded a sporting scholarship. Following his retirement from professional rugby in France, Simutoga returned to take up residence in New Zealand.
