= Frank Barclay (rugby league) =

New Zealand rugby league footballer (1887–1959)

Personal information
- Full name: Francis Hauāuru Barclay (Pakere)
- Born: 5 June 1887; Tauranga, New Zealand
- Died: 20 November 1959 (aged 72); Dannevirke, New Zealand

Playing information
- Weight: 83 kg (182 lb)
- Position: Stand-off, Halfback, Centre
Representative
| Years | Team | Pld | T | G | FG | P |
|---|---|---|---|---|---|---|
| 1908 | Auckland | 1 | 0 | 0 | 0 | 0 |
| 1908–09 | New Zealand Māori | 20 | 2 | 0 | 0 | 6 |
| 1912 | Dannevirke (sub union) | 2 | 2 | 0 | 0 | 6 |
| 1912 | Hawke's Bay | 4 | 1 | 0 | 0 | 3 |
| 1914 | New Zealand | 1 | 0 | 0 | 0 | 0 |
- Relatives: Glen Barclay (brother); Wattie Barclay (brother); Aaron Hape (great grandson)

Francis Hauāuru Barclay DCM (surname Pakere in Māori; 5 June 1887 – 20 November 1959) was a New Zealand professional rugby league footballer who played in the 1900s and 1910s. He played at representative level for New Zealand, New Zealand Māori, Auckland and Hawke's Bay, as a stand-off.

== Personal life ==
Barclay was born in Tauranga in 1887 and was the son of David Barclay, the Te Reo Māori interpreter for the 15th New Zealand Parliament. Barclay affiliated with the Ngāti Kahungunu iwi.

His brother, Walter Barclay, was a New Zealand professional rugby union footballer, sports administrator and military officer. He captained the New Zealand Māori Rugby Team and holds the record for the highest number of tries scored for the team with 40 career tries.

His other brother, Glen Barclay, was also a professional rugby league footballer who represented the New Zealand Māori team and was a member of the groundbreaking 1908 New Zealand Māori rugby league tour of Australia.

He is the great-grandfather of Fellow of the Royal Society of Arts, Aaron Hape.

He died in Dannevirke in 1959.

== Playing career ==
=== New Zealand Māori ===
Barclay played for New Zealand Māori on their groundbreaking 1908 tour of Australia, also serving as the tour secretary.

=== Auckland ===
On his return to Australia he played for Auckland in their second match against Wellington. He again toured Australia with New Zealand Māori in 1909.

=== Dannevirke and Hawke's Bay ===
By 1912 Barclay was playing for Dannevirke. He played in 2 matches for the sub-union team against Napier scoring 2 tries. He was then selected for the Hawke's Bay team. He played 4 matches in that season against Auckland, Hamilton, Wanganui, and the touring New South Wales.

=== International honours ===
Barclay represented New Zealand in 1914 against the touring Great Britain Lions. He played at standoff in a 16–13 loss at the Auckland Domain in front of 15,000 spectators.

Barclay, along with his brother Walter, was selected for the New Zealand Māori Pioneer Battalion rugby team that toured Europe following the conclusion of World War I.

== Military service ==
Barclay served with the New Zealand Māori Pioneer Battalion in World War I. As well as receiving the Victory Medal and the British War Medal, Barclay was awarded the Distinguished Conduct Medal by George V for gallantry in the 1919 New Year Honours. His citation read that he was awarded for:

"...exceptionally good work during the period 25 February to 16–17 September 1918. He is exceedingly cool under fire, and sets a splendid example to his men. On 8 September he with two sections of his platoon, was employed in Metz-en-Coutre. The enemy concentrated a heavy artillery fire for four hours on the village. Notwithstanding this he kept his men well in hand, and completed the task upon which he was engaged. He then withdrew his party to a place of safety in good order."

He was presented with his decoration by Brigadier-General Keith Stewart while stationed at No. 5 Camp, Larkhill while the battalion waited to return home to New Zealand. Barclay concluded his service with the rank of Sergeant.

== Bibliography ==
- Cowan, James (1926). The Maoris in the Great War: A History of The New Zealand Native Contingent and Pioneer Battalion: Gallipoli, 1915, France and Flanders, 1916–1918.
- Pugsley, Christopher (2019). Te Hokowhitu a Tu : the Maori Pioneer Battalion in the First World War ([New edition] ed.). Auckland [N.Z.] ISBN 978-0-947506-38-4. OCLC 1057617462.
- Mulholland, Malcolm (2009). Beneath the Māori Moon : An illustrated history of Māori rugby. Huia. ISBN 978-1-86969-305-3. OCLC 76237845.
- Soutar, Monty (2019). Whitiki! Whiti! Whiti! E! Māori In the First World War. Bateman Books. ISBN 978-1-86953-958-0.
- "New Zealand Military Force records for BARCLAY, Francis – WWI 16/1404, WWII 805423 – Army" natlib.govt.nz. Retrieved 2022-04-08
