= John Atirau Asher =

New Zealand Māori leader (1892–1966)

John Atirau Asher OBE (8 August 1892 – 14 December 1966) was a New Zealand tribal leader, politician, interpreter and racehorse owner. Of Māori descent, he identified with the Ngati Pikiao, Ngati Pukenga and Te Arawa iwi. He was born in Tauranga, New Zealand, on 8 August 1892.

Asher was the second-youngest of 11 children. His five brothers all became prominent rugby union and league players, including Ernie and Albert Asher.

In the 1965 Queen's Birthday Honours, Asher was appointed an Officer of the Order of the British Empire, for services to the Māori people.
