= Lindisfarne College, New Zealand =

Lindisfarne College

Location
- 600 Pakowhai Road; Hastings, New Zealand; 39.6244°S 176.8349°E

Information
- Type: State Integrated, Boys, Intermediate & Secondary
- Motto: Ascensiones In Corde – Highways in the Heart
- Denomination: Presbyterian
- Established: 14 April 1953
- Ministry of Education Institution no.: 230
- Rector: Craig Hardman
- Enrolment: 564 (July 2026)
- Socio-economic decile: 9Q
- Website: Official website

Lindisfarne College is a state-integrated Presbyterian boys' day and boarding intermediate and high school in Hastings, New Zealand. The school is named after the Holy Isle of Lindisfarne, site of the medieval Celtic monastery and castle on the northeastern coast of England. The college was established on 14 April 1953, by the Herrick family. The founding roll of 33 students now comprises around 500 students. Roughly half the school students are full or weekly boarders. Its sister school, Iona College for girls, is in nearby Havelock North.

The current rector is Craig Hardman.

== Scottish heritage ==
Lindisfarne emphasises its Scottish and Presbyterian heritage. This is in accordance with the wishes of the Herrick family, who gifted the land on which the college stands for the creation of a school in 1953. Additionally, the college's founding rector, Rev. F. H. Robertson, was a minister in the Presbyterian Church of Aotearoa New Zealand, and established a Presbyterian and Scottish dimension to the college. The college hosts an annual Burns supper, has a pipe band, and hosts the annual Easter Highland Games for the Hawke's Bay region. The college's formal uniform includes the wearing of tartan kilts, and its social studies curriculum includes mandatory learning of the school's Celtic heritage.

== College Grounds ==
=== Campus ===
Lindisfarne is on two sites in the suburb of Frimley, in Hastings. The main college campus is on 8 hectares, while a further 9 hectares is located nearby and divided into two sports venues called "The Farne" and "Ranui Fields." The campus is centred around the original Herrick Family homestead, a three-storeyed late-19th century farmhouse that has been renovated to house the college's administration offices. The homestead adjoins an old tennis court area that has since evolved into the "Homestead Lawn." The lawn provides the central feature of the college's gardens, edged by flower beds, native ferns, English trees and a stream. The boarding residences are on the main campus, and are organised into year groups. A number of private residences are also situated on the college campus and house the rector, the deputy rector, the chaplain, and the boarding masters.

=== Dibble Sculptures ===
The college grounds are also home to three major works by New Zealand sculptor Paul Dibble. The first sculpture, commissioned by the College Foundation in 2000, is a representation of the college's dual heritage, bearing engravings of the Celtic cross and per saltire Cross of St. Andrew along with iconic Māori patterns. The second sculpture, commissioned in 2007, depicts a fish set below a bronze replica of the ruins of the medieval Lindisfarne Priory at Holy Isle. The most recent sculpture consists of a seven piece representation of the changing seasons, at the centre of which is a large heart — a reference to the college's motto 'Highways in the Heart' — engraved with the names of artists such as Ludwig van Beethoven, Banksy, and Māori artist Ralph Hotere.

== Te Whāiti-Nui-A-Toi Programme ==
Lindisfarne has also developed a strong Māori cultural dimension since the establishment of the Te Whāiti-Nui-A-Toi Scholarship in 1972. The scholarship, which has historical connections to the Māori Synod through the work of Presbyterian Missionaries to the Ngāi Tūhoe people of the Te Urewera region, provides funding support for Māori boys attending the college. Te Whāiti-Nui-A-Toi scholars have also represented Lindisfarne at major cultural events, such as the Hawke's Bay Secondary Schools Cultural Festival and the Manu Korero speech competition. Sir Rodney Gallon was de facto patron of the Te Whāiti-Nui-A-Toi scholarship programme from 1972 until his death in 2012. All students are required to learn a haka of the local Ngāti Kahungunu iwi, which is performed at various sports and cultural events.

== Joint Activities & Exchanges ==
Lindisfarne is adjacent to Hastings Girls' High School, with which it has joint musical ensembles, notably the Concord Symphonic Band. The college also produces annual theatrical productions, in conjunction with either Hastings Girls' High School, Iona College, or Woodford House. Lindisfarne has also had long-standing associations with Turakina Maori Girls' College and St Joseph's Māori Girls' College through the kapa haka activities of Te Whāiti-Nui-A-Toi Scholars attending the college.

== Houses ==
Lindisfarne has a house system with four houses: Aidan, Cuthbert, Oswald, and Durham. Students participate in inter-house activities with the goal of winning the Gahan Shield.

== Funding ==
In January 2016 it was reported that Lindisfarne receives an annual average of $4000 per student in private donations, the highest of any state-integrated school in New Zealand. Between the period 2000-2020 the college received a total of $22,345,987 in private donations.

As of 2017 the college reportedly charges $12650 per year for day students. Although this includes several voluntary components, the charges are bundled together as "consolidated fees."

== College Rectors ==
- 1953–1954 — Reverend F. H. Robertson
- 1955–1956 — P. H. G. Southwell
- 1956–1959 — J. W. Scougall
- 1959–1970 — A. C. Francis
- 1970–1978 — J. H. N. Pine
- 1978–1980 — P. M. Hill
- 1980–2000 — W. G. Smith
- 2000–2009 — G. W. Lander
- 2010–2020 — K. MacLeod
- 2020–2025 — S. Hakeney
- 2026-current — Craig Hardman

== Notable alumni ==
=== Arts & Culture ===
- Martin Campbell – Film and TV director. Best known for directing Bond movies GoldenEye (1995) and Casino Royale (2006). He also directed The Mask of Zorro (1998), The Legend of Zorro (2005), and Green Lantern (2011).

=== Politics ===
- John Falloon – National MP (1977–1996), Cabinet Minister.
- Jordan Williams – Co-founder and Executive Director of the New Zealand Taxpayers' Union.

=== Civics ===
- Hon. Sir Justice Joseph Williams – High Court Judge and former Chief Judge of the Māori Land Court.

=== Sport ===
- Mick Duncan – All Black (1971)
- Campbell Johnstone – All Black (2005)
- Tiaan Falcon – Rugby union player for Toyota Verblitz (2020–)
- Duane Kale ONZM – Winner of four gold, one silver, and one bronze medal in swimming at the 1996 Atlanta Paralympic Games. Chef de Mission for New Zealand at the 2008 Beijing Paralympic Games and the 2012 London Paralympic Games. Member of the International Paralympic Committee.
- John Timu – All Black (1988–94) and played for the New Zealand Rugby League team (1995–1997)
- Taine Randell – All Black (1997–2002), All Black Captain (1998–1999)
- Israel Dagg – All Black (2010–2017)
- Laurent Simutoga – Rugby union prop who played for Paris (2007–2009) and La Rochelle (2010–2011) in the French Top 14.
- Hugh Renton – Super Rugby player for the Hurricanes (2017) and Highlanders (2021–)
- Matthew Gould – Goalkeeper for Altrincham F.C. in the National League (2020–)
- George Bridge – All Black (2018–2021)
- Tom Mackintosh – Gold medalist in Men's Rowing eight 2020 Summer Olympics, University level rugby (2014–2015)
- Geordie Beamish – Professional athlete, New Zealand and Oceanian record-holder in long-distance running events.

=== Academia ===
- Robert M. Carter – Professor of Earth Sciences at James Cook University (1981–1988).
