= 1908 New Zealand Māori rugby league tour of Australia =

The 1908 New Zealand Māori rugby league tour of Australia was a tour made by a group of New Zealand Māori rugby footballers who played rugby league matches in Queensland and New South Wales. The tour had a large role in helping the New South Wales Rugby League establish itself in Sydney. As a result, the tour is a significant part of rugby league history. Financial and legal issues disrupted the end of the tour and an exhibition match held under rugby union rules was held to help pay for the team's return voyage to New Zealand.

== Background ==
Rugby league was founded in 1895 when rugby union clubs in Northern England split from the governing body over the ability to pay their players and formed the Northern Union. Similar tensions developed in Australasia and they came to a head when the 1905 Original All Blacks toured Great Britain. This tour made the New Zealand Rugby Union a huge profit of £12,000, yet the players were only paid 3/- a day expenses while on tour.

This resulted in the 1907-08 New Zealand tour of Great Britain to play the Northern union clubs. At the same time in Sydney the New South Wales Rugby League was forming, resulting in the 1908 NSWRFL season.

Albert Asher, an All Black who was injured and could not tour with the 1907-08 New Zealand side, began organising with the NSWRL to host a tour of a New Zealand Māori side, perhaps inspired by the successful 1888–1889 New Zealand Native football team that toured Britain and Australia. Many Māori were reportedly unhappy by their treatment from the Wellington-based NZRU.

== Switch of codes ==
New Zealand newspapers at the time reported that the tour was traveling to Sydney to play the fifteen man code. These reports would have allayed concern from the New Zealand Rugby Union about another break-away tour being organised.

Stories published after the teams arrival in Sydney stated that they had been surprised to be met by members of the New South Wales Rugby League instead of the New South Wales Rugby Union yet, after a brief meeting, voted to change codes. This story was later retold by the party members, including by Ernie Asher in a 1960 Auckland Star interview.

However, Albert Asher knew the distinction between the two codes and had been negotiating with the NSWRL for months. Sydney newspapers had also published itineraries and stories about the Māori side that was to play the professional clubs.

== The tour ==
The touring party arrived in Sydney in June and watched the final match of the 1907-08 All Golds on 6 June before the All Golds returned to New Zealand. The Māori side watched a round of the NSWRL Premiership and were advised by referee George Boss as they learned the rules.

Two days later, on Monday 8 June 1908, the first match of the tour took place against New South Wales and was held as a benefit match to raise funds for the family of Albert Baskiville. New South Wales led 7-3 at halftime and won the match 18-9. The first team for the Māori was Riki Papakura, Hone Tuki, Albert Asher (c), Hauauru Pakere, Te Keepa Pouwhiuwhiu, Niko Ratete, Hone Whiteriana, Hone Pihama, Punga Pakere, TJ Iharairawa, Haukore Ririnui, Henare Rota and Hokopa Hatana. The NSWRL reported that £1,058 was taken at the gate, followed by another £176 at a music concert held in the Town Hall that evening.

New South Wales also won the second fixture, 30-16 in front of 20,000 fans. Dally Messenger scored 18 of the points himself for New South Wales. The Māori then recorded their first win of the tour, defeating Sydney Metropolitan in a mid-week match. During the match the NSWRL secretary, James Giltinan, left the ground to argue with the referee - creating the first tension between Giltinan and Asher.

The team then traveled north to Newcastle but not before Giltinan and Asher could clash over the appointment of the touring referee. The team defeated Newcastle 15-2 before heading to Queensland. Due to the dispute over the referee Giltinan made the party pay for the referees expenses. Following the development of legal issues, ten of the touring party were left behind in Sydney when they headed to Queensland. However Giltinan overrode this decision and later sent them to Queensland, at the touring party's expense.

In Queensland, the Māori won the first match against Queensland 19-16 after leading 16-10 at halftime. They also won the midweek match 13-5. Queensland won the third match 6-5 after a late try to William Hardcastle, a former All Black who now resided in Queensland. The teams then headed to country towns for a series of exhibition matches.

The first exhibition match at the Toowoomba Agricultural Society Ground ended in controversy when the whole Māori team left the field following the sending off of Hauauru Pakere by referee Micky Dore, who had played for Queensland in Brisbane. The sending off resulted in a brawl that involved spectators and Albert Asher led his team off the field as he feared for his players safety. The second exhibition was played in Warwick and Queensland won 23-14.

On their return to Sydney they played a match against Newcastle, winning 30-16.

Once back in Sydney the Māori played a match against a full Australian side, losing 10-20. They then won a match against Sydney Metropolitan at Birchgrove Park. Sydney included Dally Messenger however Sydney lost 13-34.

Simmering tensions between Giltinan and Asher then exploded, resulting in the cancellation of the rest of the tour. Matches against Australia and New South Wales had been planned, as well as potentially a third match against Australia in Melbourne. Initial media reports said the second match against Australia was delayed due to rain, however, Asher had accused Giltinan of being untruthful about gatetakings for the matches and deducting ground hire fees, despite having a lease over the Sydney Agricultural Ground.

With the official tour ended and gate takings being held by the NSWRL due to a court order, the Māori needed to find a way to pay for their return voyage. A match under rugby union rules was held at the Sports Ground between the "New Zealand Natives" and a "Metropolis" side made up of players sympathetic to the touring parties plight. The match was a mis-match and the Natives won 32-17.

The team was on the dock to wish the Australian side well on their 1908–09 Kangaroo tour of Great Britain. As soon as the team departed, acting NSWRL secretary Horrie Miller paid for the fares home to New Zealand and the Māori side returned home.

=== Legal troubles ===
Robert Jack, who was based in Sydney, claimed he had been arranging with Asher to bring a tour to Sydney since October 1907. Following a breakdown in negotiations Asher began negotiating directly with the NSWRL. After their first Sydney leg, Jack took the matter to court where he was successful in having the NSWRL gate takings frozen until the dispute could be resolved. This left the touring party deeply out of pocket and a reduced party was sent on the Queensland leg to save costs.

The matter was left unresolved and was again raised in the courts when the 1909 side visited Australia.

== Aftermath ==
Eight of the players on the tour went on to have notable rugby league careers, with four later representing New Zealand and two playing in the New South Wales Rugby League premiership.

Another Māori tour was organised and the team visited Australia during the 1909 season. These two tours are credited with helping financially establishing the New South Wales Rugby League, as at the time it was surviving “from hand to mouth”.

Māori players played a big role in the City Rovers and Manukau clubs and a Rotorua sub-league was formed linked to the Auckland Rugby League during the 1909 season.

== Squad ==
Four chiefs accompanied the touring party.

Maori name	English name	Position	Bio
Arapeta Paurini Wharepapa	Albert Asher	three-quarters	Former All Black who would later represent New Zealand and Australasia, tour organiser
Ariki Haira	Alex Stanaway	forward	From Auckland and originally from Northern Wairoa, later represented New Zealand
Hone Haira	Jack Stanaway	inside back	Brother of Ariki/Alex, future test referee
Hokopa Hatana		forward	From Tauranga
Kokau Hikurangi		inside back	
Te Hoeroa McLeod		forward	From Tauranga
Mikaere Heretaunga		forward	
TJ Iharairawa		forward	From Rotorua
H Manata		forward	From Waikato
Peter Moko		three-quarters	Would later play for Glebe in the NSWRL Premiership
Hauauru Pakere	Frank Barclay	utility back	From Tauranga, later represented New Zealand, tour secretary
Punga Pakere	Glen Barclay	forward	From Tauranga, brother of Frank, later played for the North Sydney Bears
Riki Papakura		utility back	From Manonui, later played for Australasia and Warrington
Hone Pihama		forward	From Taranaki, heaviest on tour at 15 stone
Te Keepa Pouwiuwhiu	Ernie Asher	three-quarters	From Tauranga, brother of Albert, later represented New Zealand
Nikorima Ratete	Nikki Rogers	inside back	From Rotorua
Pura Ratete	P Rogers	forward	From Rotorua
Haukore Ririnui		forward	From Tauranga
Henare Ririnui		three-quarters	From Tauranga
Henare Rota		forward	from Goldfields
Pita Tapihana	Peter Tapsell	forward	from Bay of Plenty
Hemuera Tawhai		halfback	from Rotorua
Hone Tuki		three-quarters	from Northland
Pirita Wharepapa		forward	from Tauranga
Hone Whiteriana		utility back	from Tauranga
Nutana Wiki		wing	from Northland

== Match results ==
Date	Opponent	Venue	Result	Score	Attendance	Report
8 June	New South Wales	Sydney Agricultural Ground, Sydney	Loss	9-18	30,000	
13 June	New South Wales	Sydney Agricultural Ground, Sydney	Loss	16-30	20,000	
17 June	Sydney Metropolitan	Wentworth Park, Sydney	Win	23-20		
20 June	Newcastle	Newcastle Showgrounds, Newcastle	Win	15-2	4,000	
27 June	Queensland	Brisbane Exhibition Ground, Brisbane	Win	19-6	8,000	
1 July	Queensland	Brisbane Exhibition Ground, Brisbane	Win	13-5		
4 July	Queensland	Brisbane Exhibition Ground, Brisbane	Loss	5-6	6,000	
7 July	Queensland (exhibition)	Toowoomba Agricultural Society Ground, Toowoomba	Loss	9-11		
8 July	Queensland (exhibition)	Queen's Park, Warwick	Loss	14-26		
11 July	Newcastle	Albion Ground, Maitland	Win	30-16		
18 July	Australia	Sydney Agricultural Ground, Sydney	Loss	10-20	6,000	
22 July	Sydney Metropolitan	Birchgrove Park, Sydney	Win	34-13	500	
12 August	Metropolitan XV under rugby union rules as New Zealand Natives	Sydney Sports Ground, Sydney	Win	32-17	300	
