= Alex Stanaway =

NZ international rugby league footballer

Personal information
- Full name: Alexander William Stanaway
- Born: 14 July 1886 Aratapu, Northland Region, New Zealand
- Died: 27 June 1972 (aged 85) New Zealand

Playing information
- Position: Prop
Club
Years	Team	Pld	T	G	FG	P
1910–13	City Rovers	20	1	13	0	29
Representative
Years	Team	Pld	T	G	FG	P
1908–09	New Zealand Māori	17	3	4	0	17
1908–12	Auckland	4	0	1	0	2
1911	New Zealand	6	1	0	0	3
- Relatives: Jack Stanaway (brother)

Alexander William Stanaway (14 July 1886 – 27 June 1972), also known as Ariki Haira, was a New Zealand rugby league player who represented New Zealand. His brother, Jack Stanaway, was also a professional rugby league footballer and international referee. While their younger brother Montrose (Monty) played for Otahuhu Rovers and City Rovers in the 1910s and died as a victim of the influenza epidemic in 1918.

== Playing career ==
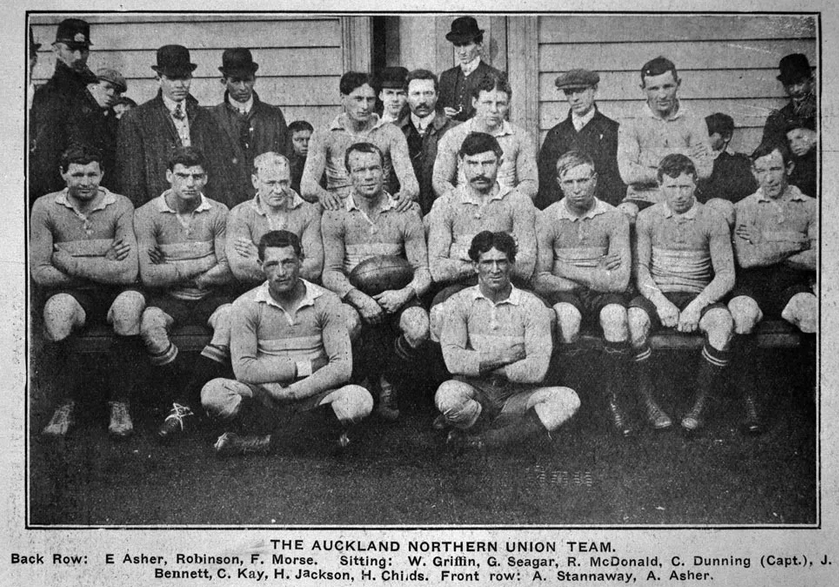
Stanaway in the Auckland side to play Wellington on 5 August 1911.

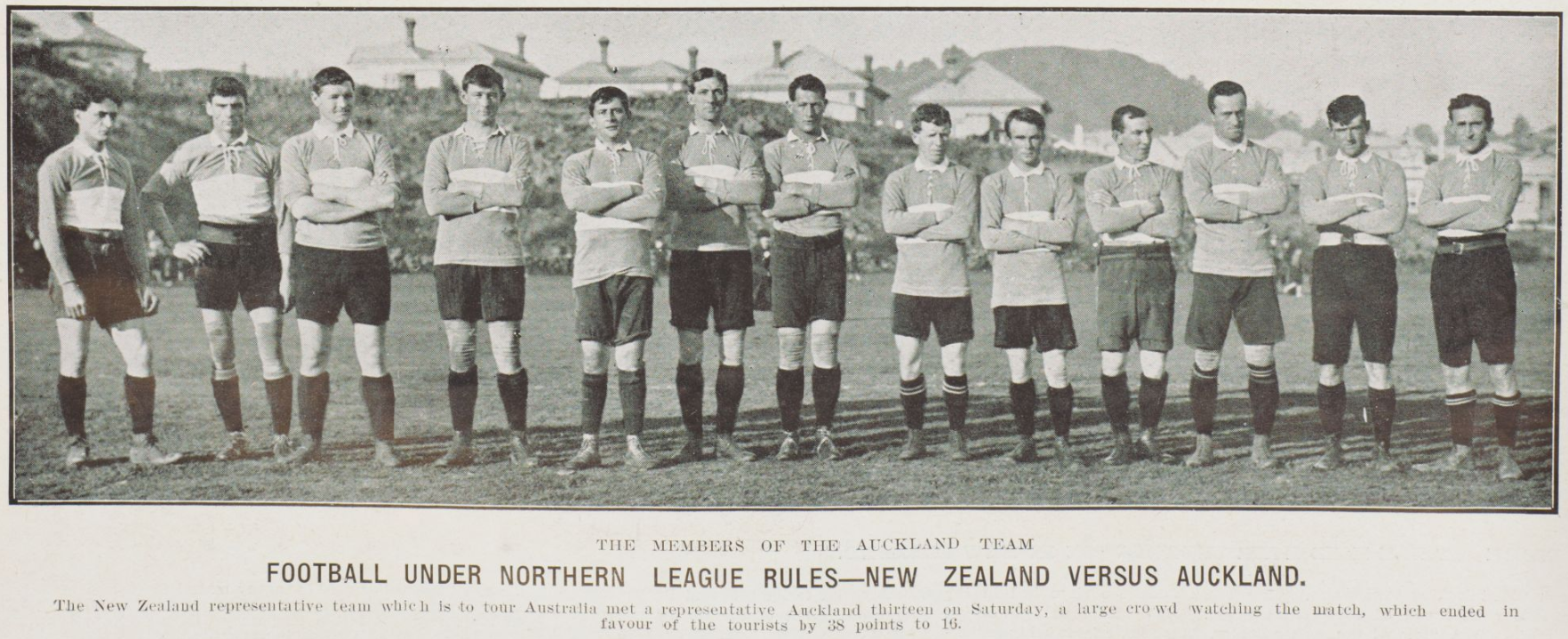
Stanaway in the Auckland team to play New Zealand at Eden Park.

Stanaway toured Australia in 1908 with the first New Zealand Māori rugby league team. He again toured Australia in 1909 with a New Zealand Māori side.

Also in 1909, Stanaway played for the new City Rovers club in the Auckland Rugby League competition and represented Auckland.

In 1910, the Great Britain Lions toured New Zealand. Stanaway played for Auckland against the Lions.

In 1911, Stanaway was selected to represent New Zealand in their tour of Australia. No test matches were played on the tour.

In 1912 Stanaway played for the Auckland side that lost to New Zealand 16-38.

== Later years ==
In 1916, Stanaway was called up to serve in the New Zealand Expeditionary Force.

He died on 27 June 1972.
