= Glen Barclay =

New Zealand rugby league footballer

Glen Barclay / Punga Pakere
Personal information
- Full name: Glenville Te Punga o Te Arawa Barclay
- Born: 6 September 1888 Tauranga, New Zealand
- Died: 19 February 1959 (aged 70)

Playing information
- Weight: 14 st 0 lb (89 kg)
- Position: Forward
Club
Years	Team	Pld	T	G	FG	P
1910	North Sydney	6	1	0	0	3
Representative
Years	Team	Pld	T	G	FG	P
1908–≥08	New Zealand Māori	1	1	0	0	3
- Relatives: Frank Barclay (brother); Wattie Barclay (brother)

Glenville Te Punga o Te Arawa Barclay (6 September 1888 – 19 February 1959) (surname Pakere in Māori) was a New Zealand professional rugby league footballer who played in the 1900s and 1910s. He played at representative level for New Zealand Māori, and at club level for North Sydney, as a forward.

== International honours ==
Barclay represented New Zealand Māori on the groundbreaking 1908 New Zealand Māori rugby league tour of Australia.

== Personal life ==
Barclay was the brother of the rugby league footballer, Frank Barclay (whose Māori name was Hauāuru Pakere).
