= Alex Usanov =

Irish rugby union player

- Born: 10 July 2005 (age 21) Republic of Ireland
- Height: 1.82 m (5 ft 11 1/2 in)
- Weight: 111 kg (17.5 st; 245 lb)
- School: Belvedere College SJ

Rugby union career
- Position: Loosehead prop
Senior career
Years	Team	Apps	(Points)
2024–	Leinster	14	(0)
- Correct as of 21 March 2026
International career
Years	Team	Apps	(Points)
2024–2025	Ireland U20	6	(5)
2025-	Ireland A	1	(0)
- Correct as of 8 November 2025

Alexander Usanov (born 10 July 2005) is an Irish rugby union player who plays as a loosehead prop in the Leinster system. He has represented Ireland U20.

== Personal life ==
Usanov came through the minis and youth ranks at Malahide RFC before progressing to the Leinster pathway.

Usanov attended Belvedere College SJ, where he excelled in judo, jiu-jitsu and shot put, earning multiple national and European medals before focusing on rugby.

Usanov's half sister Dasha is married to Mark Sexton, Ulster rugby attack coach and brother of Johnny Sexton.

== Professional career ==
=== Leinster ===
Usanov was part of the 2024–25 Leinster Academy intake. Ahead of the 2025–26 season he signed his first senior contract with Leinster.

== International career ==
Usanov has represented Ireland U20 in the 2024 and 2025 Six Nations championships.
