= Manaia, Waikato =

Manaia
- Coordinates: 36°51′18″S 175°28′57″E
- Country: New Zealand
- Region: Waikato
- District: Thames-Coromandel District

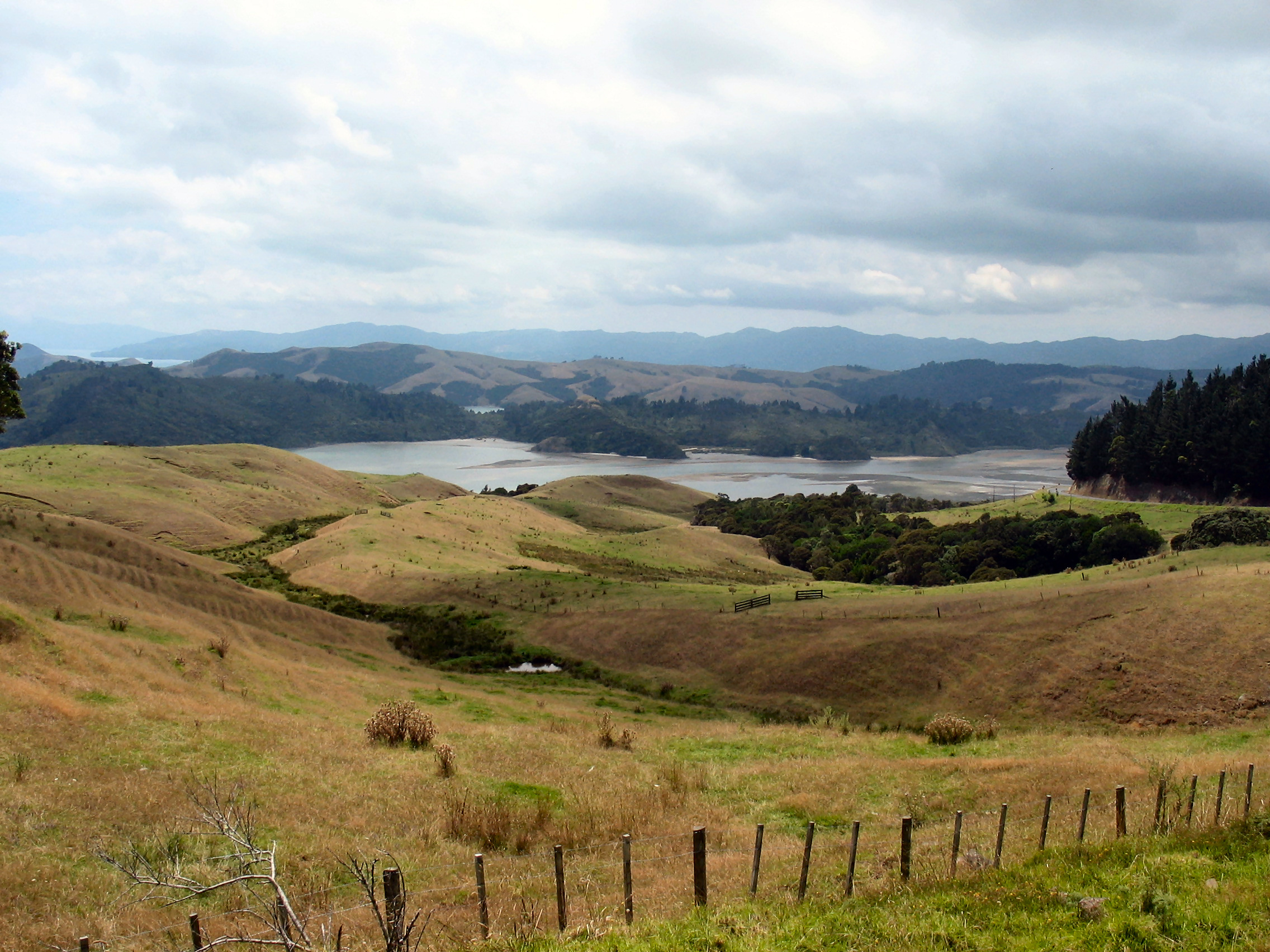
Manaia Harbour

Manaia is a locality on the western side of the Coromandel Peninsula of New Zealand. It lies to the east of State Highway 25, south of Coromandel and north of Tapu. The Manaia River flows from the Coromandel Range through the area and into the Manaia Harbour to the west. The harbour contains mussel farms.

The Manaia Forest Sanctuary, inland from Manaia, contains the sixth largest kauri tree in New Zealand. The Sanctuary contains about 410 kauri trees in an area of 101 hectares.

The local iwi are Ngāti Whanaunga and Ngāti Pūkenga.

== Education ==
Manaia School is a Composite School (Year 1–15) with a roll of 124. It has a decile rating of 2. A Manaia School is first mentioned in a Department of Education report for 1878.
