= Matthew Dallow =

New Zealand bobsledder

Personal information
- Born: 27 January 1972 (age 54) Auckland, New Zealand
- Relatives: Ross Dallow (father); Simon Dallow (brother); Graeme Dallow (uncle)

Sport
- Country: New Zealand
- Sport: Bobsleigh

Matthew Dallow (born 27 January 1972) is a New Zealand bobsledder. He competed in the two man event at the 2006 Winter Olympics.

He turned to bobsleigh after successive injuries forced him to give up his career in the decathlon and in rugby. Prior to bobsleigh, he was an All-American decathlete for the Arizona Wildcats track and field team, placing 7th at the 1993 NCAA Division I Outdoor Track and Field Championships. He was an All-American two years after René Schmidheiny, another Arizona decathlete who transitioned to Olympic bobsled. Injury also prevented him at the last minute from competing in the 2002 Olympics.

Dallow is the son of Ross Dallow and the younger brother of New Zealand television news anchor Simon Dallow.
