= Ngāti Pūkenga =

Māori iwi (tribe) in Aotearoa New Zealand

- Iwi (tribe) in Māoridom
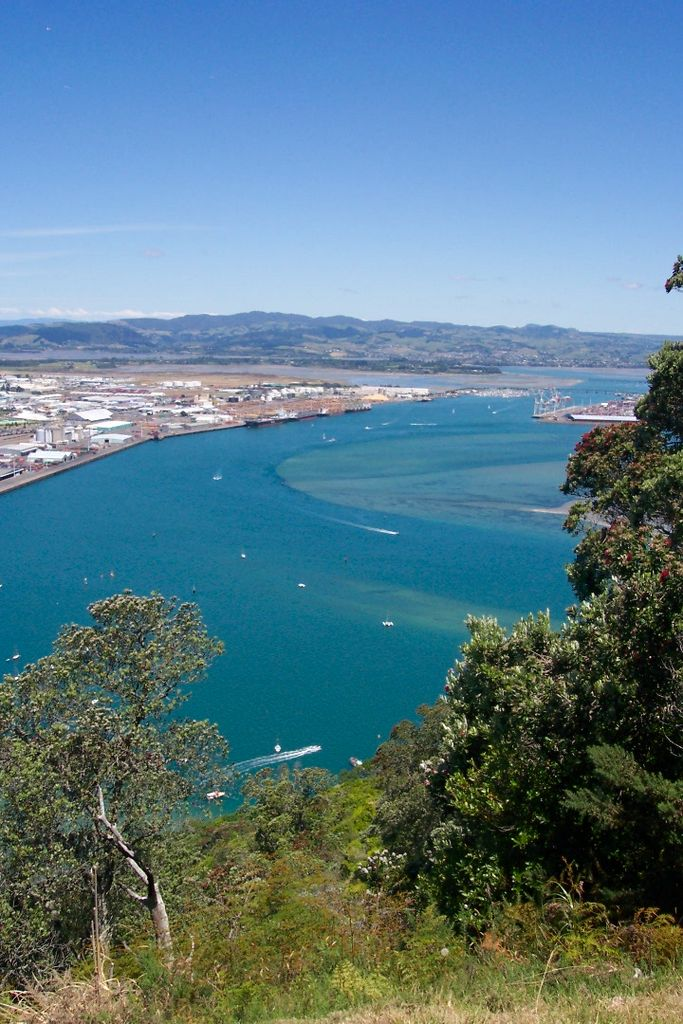
- The city of Tauranga

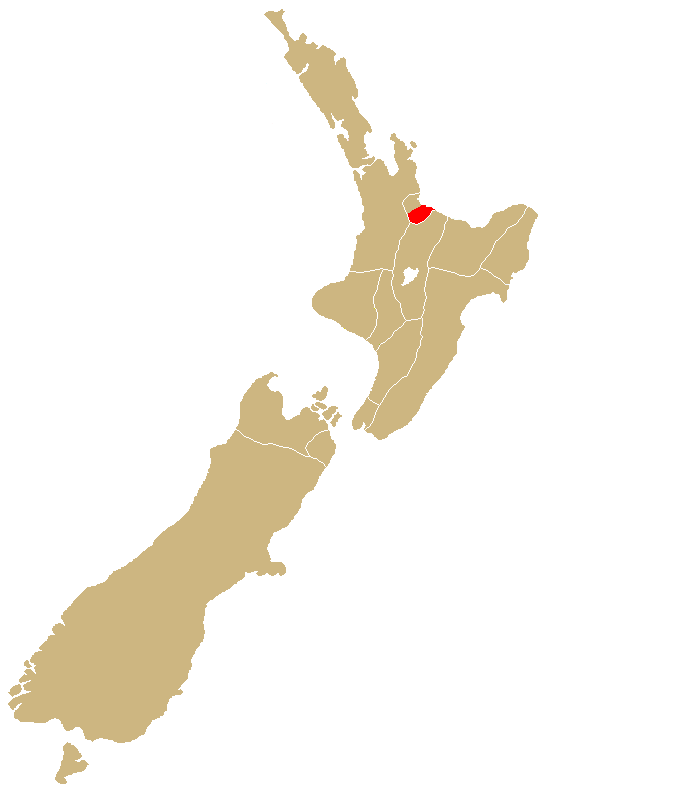
- Rohe (region): Central and northern Bay of Plenty
- Waka (canoe): Mātaatua
- Population: 2,175
- Website: www.ngatipukenga.com

Ngāti Pūkenga is a Māori iwi centred in Tauranga in the Bay of Plenty region of New Zealand. Its rohe (tribal area) extends to Mayor Island / Tuhua and Waihi in the north, to the Kaimai Range in the west, south of Te Puke and to Maketu in the east, and it has tribal holdings in Whangārei, Hauraki and Maketu.

Ngāti Pūkenga is part of the Tauranga Moana iwi group, which also includes Ngāi Te Rangi and Ngāti Ranginui. The three iwi all consider Mauao (Mt Maunganui) sacred and share many things in common. Collectively, the iwi are seeking compensation from the New Zealand Government for their losses from the New Zealand Wars but are yet to seek a settlement.

== History ==
Pūkenga is the founding ancestor of the iwi. Pūkenga was of Mātaatua descent, and spent his life in Ruatoki. Upon his death, his people, known as Ngāti Hā, moved east towards Ōpōtiki. This resulted in the displacement of the tribe of Rōmainohorangi. Later, the displaced tribe, now known as Ngāti Te Rangihouhiri, requested the help of Ngāti Hā in battle.

For their assistance, Ngāti Pūkenga, as they were now known, were given land in Tauranga, where their main settlements still stand today. Ngāti Pūkenga also received land given to them in Hauraki, the little village of Manaia, where direct descendants of Ngāti Pūkenga, and Pūkenga himself still remain.

== Kāinga and marae ==
The iwi has four kāinga: Ngāpeke (Tauranga), Maketu, Manaia and Pakikaikutu (near Whangarei).

The iwi share two marae (meeting grounds) and wharenui (meeting houses):

- Ngāpeke Marae and Te Whetū o Te Rangi wharenui in Tauranga
- Manaia Marae and Te Kou o Rehua wharenui in Manaia

== Governance ==
Te Tāwharau o Ngāti Pūkenga is the governance entity recognised by the New Zealand Government to represent Ngāti Pūkenga following its Treaty of Waitangi settlement with the Crown on 7 April 2013. The trust is governed by two trustees from each of the four kāinga.

It is a member of the Hauraki Collective.

== Media ==
Moana Radio is the radio station of all three iwi. It is available on 1440 AM and 98.2 FM in Tauranga and across the Bay of Plenty. Moana previously operated youth-oriented urban contemporary Tahi FM between 2003 and late 2011.

== Notable people ==
- John Atirau Asher, tribal leader
- Georgina Kingi, school principal
- Keith Sorrenson, historian
- Katherine Te Rongokahira Parata, tribal elder
- Rahera Te Kahuhiapo, tribal leader
- Joe Williams (judge), Supreme Court Justice

== See also ==
- List of Māori iwi
