= Graeme Dallow =

New Zealand police officer

Graeme Augustine Dallow OBE (18 August 1930 – 20 January 2014) was a senior member of the New Zealand Police, attaining the rank of Assistant Commissioner of Police.

== Early life and family ==
Dallow was born in Auckland and was educated at St Peter's College, Grafton. He was the older brother of Ross Dallow and uncle of Simon and Matthew Dallow.

== Career ==
Dallow joined the New Zealand Police in the late 1940s. He commenced duty as a constable in Police street patrols in Auckland and noticed how high the number of Māori offenders was and how much Police work was devoted to them. In 1969, Dallow, as Superintendent, was appointed as the Police representative on the joint committee of Government Officials and the New Zealand Māori Council to discuss the interaction of the Police and the Māori Wardens established under the Maori Welfare Act 1962. This resulted in increased cooperation between the bodies. In the 1970s, Dallow, as Chief Superintendent, was a member of the Police National Headquarters planning team for the 1973 Springbok tour (which in the end did not take place). He saw the possibility of utilising the training in crowd control for that tour to deal with increasing levels of street violence, especially in Auckland, which followed the extension of liquor-licensing laws from 1968. "Operation Cleanstreet" was set up to test these techniques. Following on from this, in 1974, Dallow was instrumental in setting up the Task Force to deal with street disorder among the large Māori and Pacific communities that had migrated to South Auckland. In 1977, Dallow was placed in charge of the new Public Affairs Directorate in Police National Headquarters. In 1981, Dallow, then Assistant Commissioner of Police and having responsibility for Police training and personnel, introduced martial arts into the training of the New Zealand Police. He was a martial arts practitioner himself. After his retirement, Dallow was a keen exponent of ballroom dancing, especially the Tango, and he taught dancing in Wellington.

In the 1979 New Year Honours, Dallow was appointed an Officer of the Order of the British Empire.

== Main reference ==
- Susan Butterworth, More than Law and Order: Policing in a Changing Society 1945-92, University of Otago Press, Dunedin, 2005 (Volume 5 of The History of Policing in New Zealand).
