= 1912 Auckland Rugby League season =

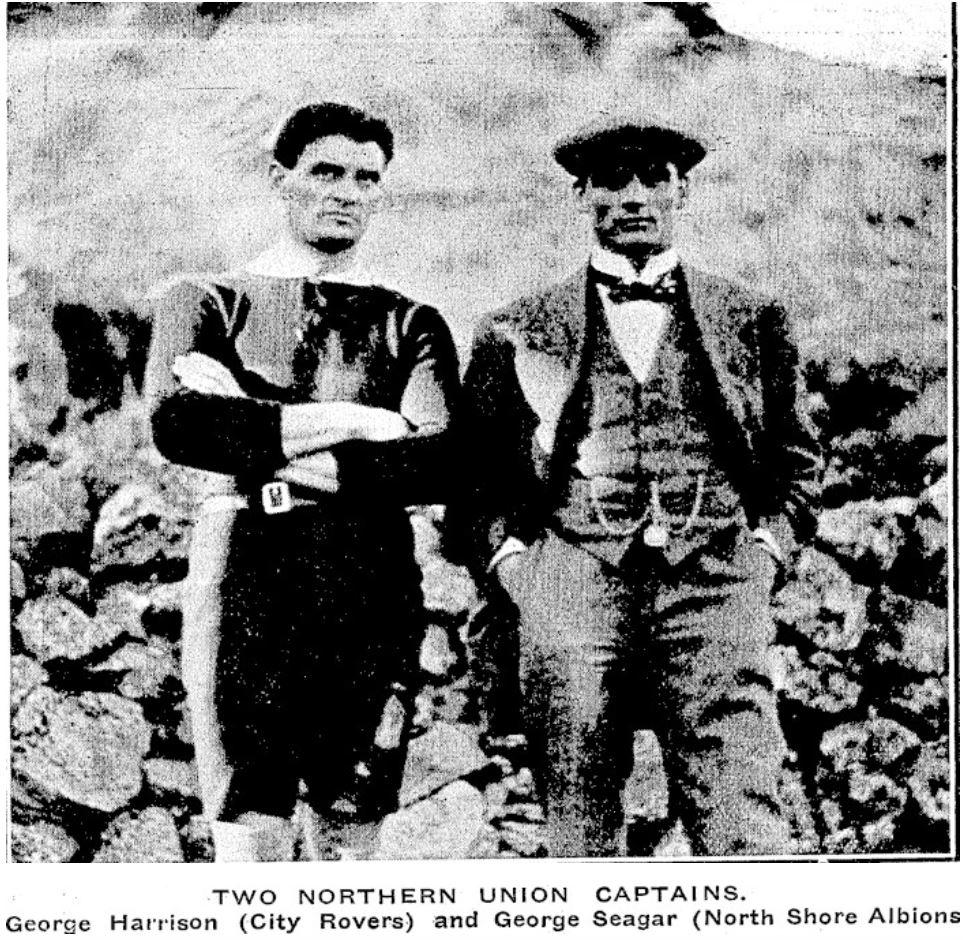
George Harrison and George Seagar

The 1912 Auckland Rugby League season was the 4th official year of the Auckland Rugby League. The season commenced on 11 May, with the start of the First Grade competition.

It saw six teams competing for the First Grade title after the addition of the Manukau Rovers who were formed after a meeting in Onehunga in March. The season commenced on 11 May with the start of the first grade competition.

Newton Rangers secured their first Auckland first grade club title after they defeated Ponsonby United in the penultimate round at Eden Park on 13 July.

| Preceded by 1911 | 4th Auckland Rugby League season 1912 | Succeeded by 1913 |

== News ==
=== Manukau Magpies formed ===
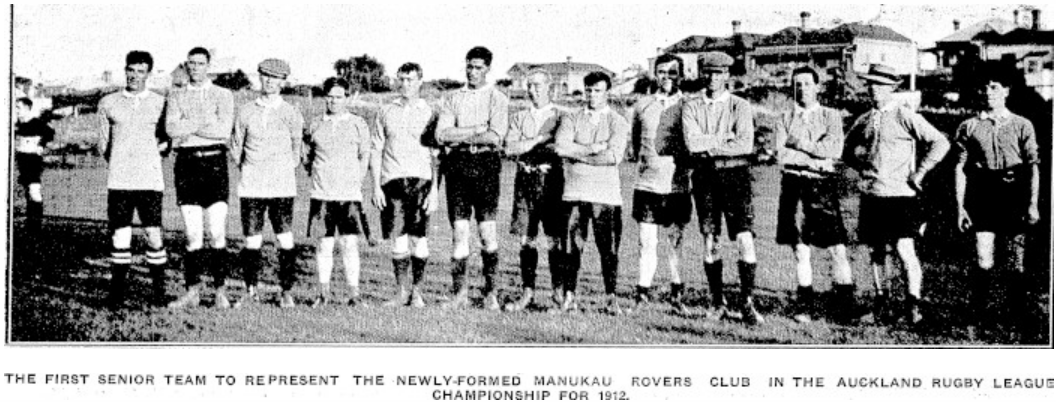
Manukau at Eden Park in May.

Manukau held a meeting in Onehunga in March. They decided to field a senior team and two junior teams. James Rukutai was their captain and after his death in 1940 the trophy for the minor premiers was named after him. Teams still play for it today.

=== Hobsonville Pirates ===
A club was formed in Hobsonville, West Auckland at the start of the season. They decided on the name of Hobsonville Pirates. They fielded a team in the second grade. They had the use of a paddock on Midgeley's farm for games and teams had to make their way there by launch from the city centre on Saturday mornings. They failed to field a side in 1913 and then in 1914 they fielded a side in the 3rd grade before folding at the end of the season.

=== Club teams and grade participation ===
| Team | 1st Grade | 2nd Grade | 3rd Grade | 4th Grade | Total |
|---|---|---|---|---|---|
| Ponsonby United | 1 | 1 | 2 | 1 | 5 |
| North Shore Albions | 1 | 1 | 1 | 1 | 4 |
| City Rovers | 1 | 1 | 1 | 1 | 4 |
| Newton Rangers | 1 | 1 | 0 | 1 | 3 |
| Manukau | 1 | 0 | 1 | 1 | 3 |
| Eden Ramblers | 1 | 0 | 1 | 1 | 3 |
| Otahuhu Rovers | 0 | 1 | 0 | 1 | 2 |
| Northcote & Birkenhead Ramblers | 0 | 1 | 1 | 0 | 2 |
| Ellerslie United | 0 | 1 | 0 | 1 | 2 |
| Hobsonville Pirates | 0 | 1 | 0 | 0 | 1 |
| Total | 6 | 8 | 7 | 8 | 29 |

== Myers Cup (First Grade Championship) ==
Thirty regular season matches were played with nearly all fixtures being played at Eden Park (25 in total). With the Devonport Domain being used for four North Shore Albions home matches, and one match at Ellerslie.

=== Statistics ===
There were 30 first grade games played with 189 tries, 74 conversions, and 27 penalties. The average number of points per game was 25.8, with 6.3 tries per game. With 74 conversions from 189 attempts the successful percentage was 39.2. These were decreases on the previous season where 28.4 points had been scored per game and the conversion percentage was 45.5 versus the current season of 39.2. A notable difference was the number of penalty goals kicked which increased from 11 from 19 games to 27 from 30 games.

=== Myers Cup standings ===
| Team | Pld | W | D | L | F | A | Pts |
|---|---|---|---|---|---|---|---|
| Newton Rangers | 10 | 8 | 0 | 2 | 223 | 83 | 16 |
| Ponsonby United | 10 | 6 | 2 | 2 | 192 | 87 | 14 |
| North Shore Albions | 10 | 5 | 1 | 4 | 129 | 111 | 11 |
| City Rovers | 10 | 4 | 0 | 6 | 94 | 146 | 8 |
| Manukau Rovers | 10 | 3 | 0 | 7 | 57 | 139 | 6 |
| Eden Ramblers | 10 | 2 | 1 | 8 | 78 | 210 | 5 |

=== Myers Cup results ===
==== Round 1 ====
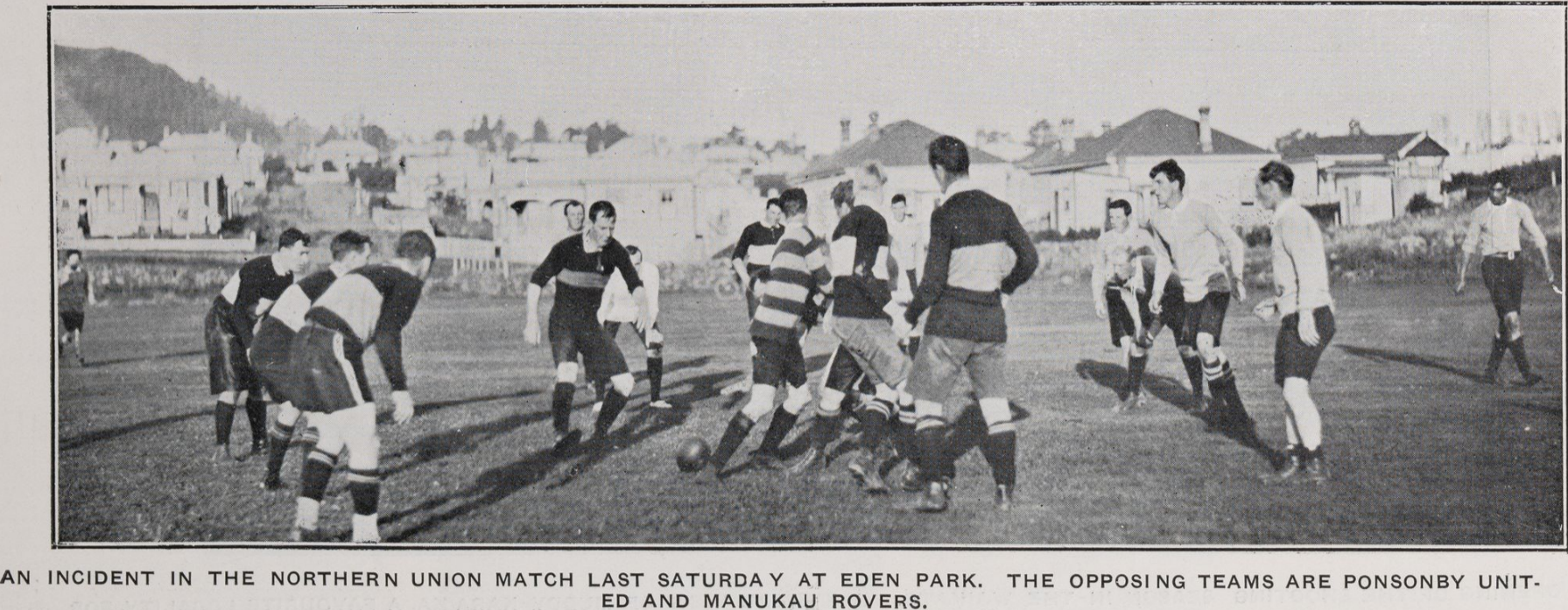
Action from Manukau v Ponsonby game.

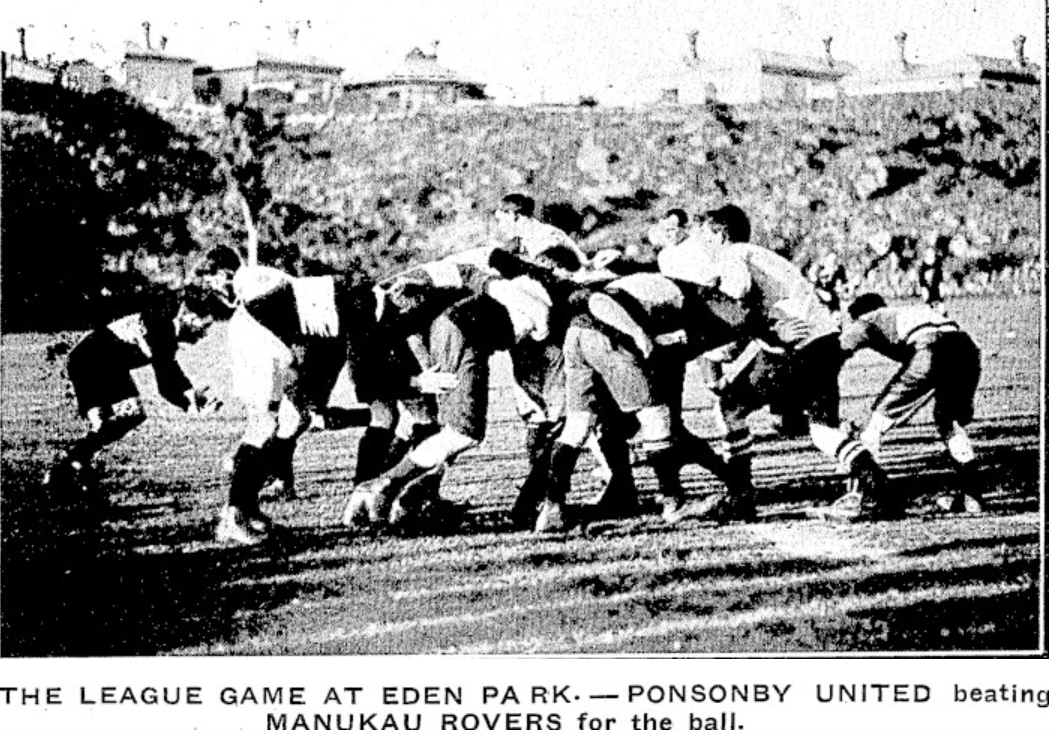

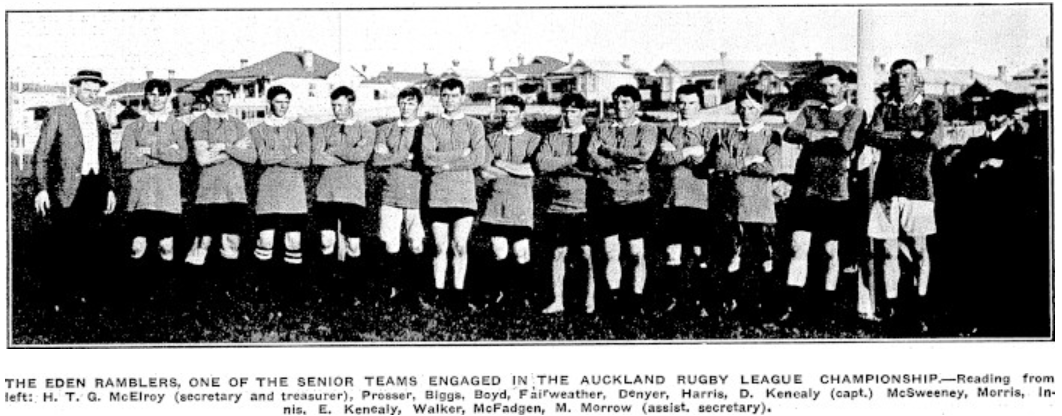
Eden Ramblers.

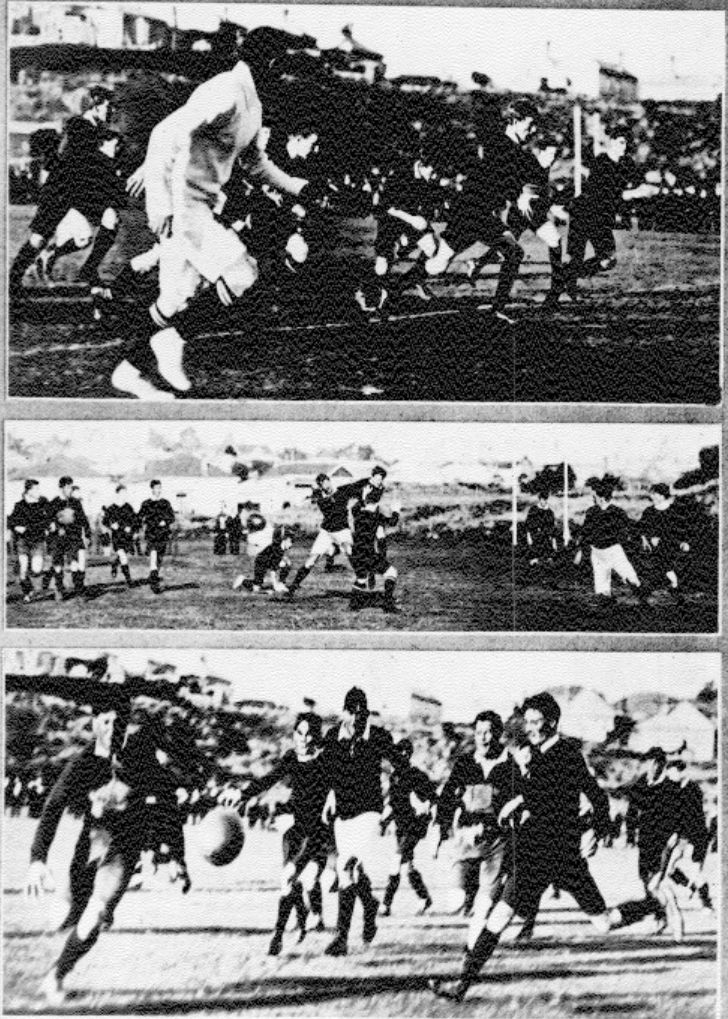
City v North Shore

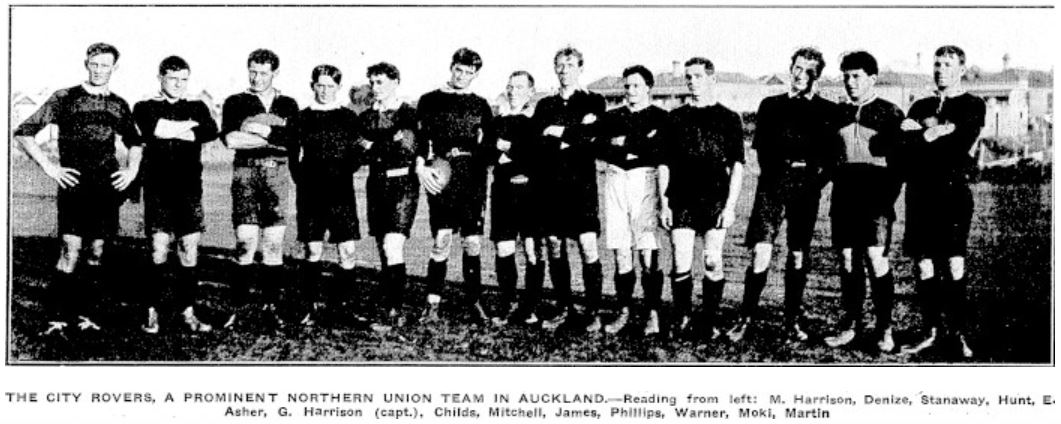
City 1912 team

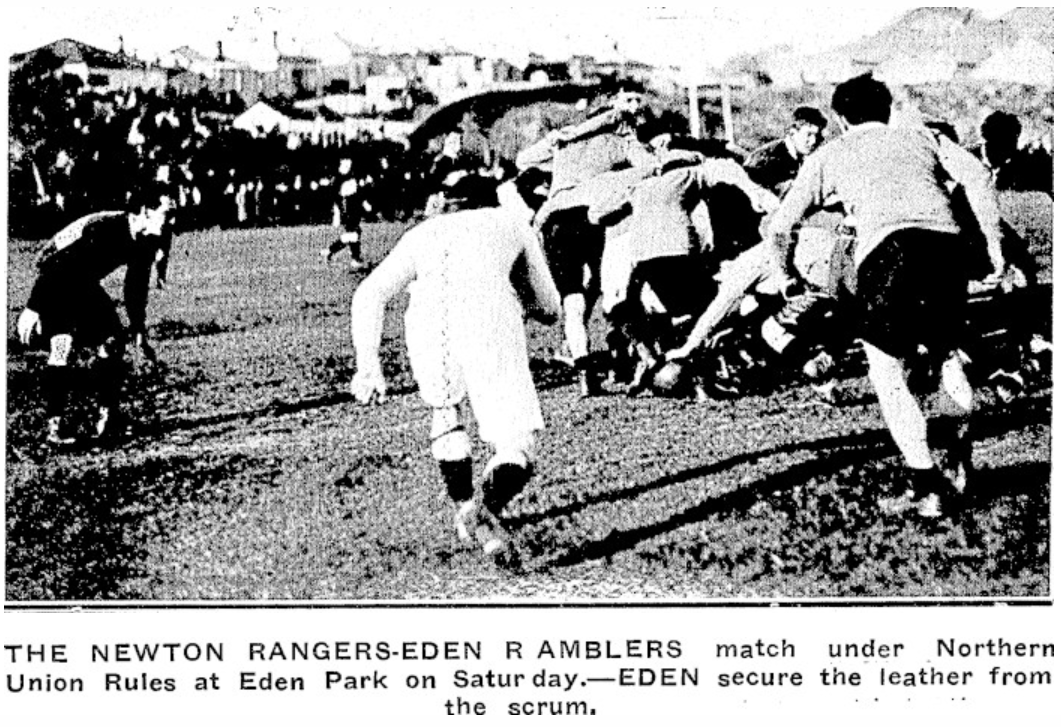

Images were published in the New Zealand Graphic of the City Rovers v North Shore Albions match. The very young Walter Jack Perry, better known as Jack Perry, debuted for Newton on the wing in their comfortable win over Eden. He played 18 games for Newton over the next 3 seasons before enlisting in the war effort. He died from wounds in France on July 10, 1916 aged 20.

| 11 May | North Shore | 13–9 | City | Eden Park 1 |
| 3:00 | Try: Stan Weston 2, Tom Haddon; Con: C Clark; Drop: Stan Weston | | Try: George Hunt 2, G James | Referee: T Cunningham |

| 11 May | Ponsonby | 19–5 | Manukau | Eden Park 2 |
| 3:00 | Try: Charles Savory, William Cossey 2, Charles Dunning, G Lambert; Con: Charles Savory, Arthur Carlaw | | Try: Arthur Hardgrave; Pen: Arthur Hardgrave | Referee: Matt Hooper |

| 11 May | Newton | 28–9 | Eden | Eden Park 3 |
| 3:00 | Try: D Healy 2, Arthur Francis, George Smith, Joe Bennett, William Mackrell; Con: Ike Healy, Arthur Francis 3 Pen: Arthur Francis | | Try: McSweeney; Pen: Don Kenealy 3 | Referee: E.R. Harker |

==== Round 2 ====
In the match between North Shore and Newton, Joe Bennett broke his leg and missed the rest of the season. He returned to captain the side at the start of the 1913 season.

| 18 May | Ponsonby | 36–12 | City | Eden Park 1 |
| 3:00 | Try: Charles Savory, R Roope, Charles Dunning, William Mincham 4, G Lambert; Con: Charles Dunning 3 Pen: Charles Dunning 2, Charles Savory | | Try: Hickey, G Warner; Con: G Warner; Pen: Alex Stanaway 2 | Attendance: 600; Referee: Matt Hooper |

| 18 May | Manukau | 11–5 | Eden | Eden Park |
| 3:00 | Try: Arthur Hardgrave, Atkins, Jim Rukutai; Con: Arthur Hardgrave | | Try: Brett; Con: Don Kenealy | Attendance: 600; Referee: Ernest Jaggs |

| 18 May | North Shore | 8–24 | Newton | Devonport Domain |
| 3:00 | Try: E Rogers, Frederick Gladding; Con: E Rogers | | Try: H Maiki 2, Billy Dervan, Alan Blakey 2, Joe Bennett; Con: Billy Dervan 2, Len Farrant | Referee: T. Cunningham |

==== Round 3 ====
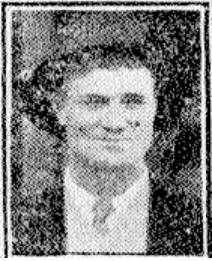
Arthur Hardgrave

Charles Webb debuted for Ponsonby after switching from the Ponsonby rugby union club. He scored a try in their 45-9 win over Eden. In the same game three other players scored multiple tries (Charles Savory 3, Sid Riley 2, and Arthur Carlaw 2) in addition to their other 4 try scorers. Both of the senior matches were played at Eden Park with 600 in attendance. The other match was played at the Devonport Domain with the home side, North Shore winning 5-3. For the defeated Manukau side their first ever New Zealand representative, Arthur Hardgrave scored their only points.

| 25 May | City | 24–13 | Newton | Eden Park |
| 3:00 | Try: Harry Childs, G James, Harold Denize, William Moeki, Frederick Mansell, Ernie Asher; Con: Alex Stanaway 3 | | Try: H Maiki 2, Billy Dervan; Con: Arthur Francis, Billy Dervan | Attendance: 600; Referee: Angus Campbell |

| 25 May | Ponsonby | 45–9 | Eden | Eden Park |
| 3:00 | Try: Charles Savory 3, Charles Dunning, Sid Riley 2, Charles Webb, William Mincham, Harry Fricker, Arthur Carlaw 2 Con: Charles Savory 3, Charles Dunning 2, Skeats | | Try: Bob Biggs, Don Kenealy 2 | Attendance: 600; Referee: T. Cunningham |

| 25 May | North Shore | 5–3 | Manukau | Devonport Domain |
| 3:30 | Try: unknown x 1 Pen: unknown x 1 | | Try: Arthur Hardgrave | Referee: E.R. Harker |

==== Round 4 ====
Eden only had nine players for their match with North Shore and after trailing by 33 points to 0 they threw in the proverbial towel and the match ended at that point. No point scorers or match description was published in the NZ Herald or Auckland Star. In the match between Ponsonby and Newton Charles Savory was ordered from the field for “rough and tumble” play just before fulltime and a match his side won by 16 to 6. He had earlier scored 2 tries and kicked a conversion. The fullback for Newton was J. Perry who had debuted weeks earlier and was said to be playing well despite being in his early teens.

| 1 June | North Shore | 33–0 | Eden | Eden Park 3 |
| 3:00 | Try: unknown Con: unknown | | | Referee: Tom Feilding |

| 1 June | Ponsonby | 16–6 | Newton | Eden Park |
| 3:00 | Try: Charles Dunning 2, Charles Savory 2 Con: Arthur Carlaw, Charles Savory | | Try: Arthur Francis 2 | Referee: T Cunningham |

| 1 June | City | 5–3 | Manukau | Eden Park |
| | Try: Frederick Mansell; Pen: Frederick Mansell | | Try: Jim Rukutai | Referee: Bob Oliphant |

==== Round 5 ====
After a scuffle between C Clark (North Shore), and Charles Webb (Ponsonby) resulted in referee Matt Hooper sending Clark off. Eden upset City with a 10-6 win to register their first win of the year. City had taken the lead towards the end of the game and from the kickoff with one minute remaining A Innes "took the ball up the field on his own" to score the winning try which Don Kenealy converted. Billy Curran switched from rugby (Marist Old Boys) and debuted for Newton. Following the game he was chosen in the New Zealand team to meet Auckland. He went on to play 6 matches for New Zealand on their Australia tour and 6 times for Auckland before signing with Wigan. He ultimately only played the one club league match in New Zealand. During the following week the Auckland Rugby League passed a resolution that no player be selected for representative fixtures unless they had played at least 4 matches in the rugby league code.

| 8 June | North Shore | 6–13 | Ponsonby | Devonport Domain |
| 3:00 | Try: George Seagar, Frederick Gladding | | Try: McPherson, G Lambert, Arthur Carlaw; Con: Charles Dunning; Pen: Charles Dunning | Attendance: 400; Referee: Matt Hooper |

| 8 June | Eden | 10–6 | City | Eden Park |
| 3:00 | Try: A Innes 2 Con: Don Kenealy; Pen: Don Kenealy | | Try: George Hunt, William Moeki | Referee: Angus Campbell |

| 8 June | Newton | 26–2 | Manukau | Eden Park |
| 3:00 | Try: William Mackrell, Billy Dervan 3, Arthur Francis 2, Con: Billy Dervan, Len Farrant 2 Drop: Len Farrant | | Pen: Arthur Hardgrave | Referee: T Cunningham |

==== Round 6 ====
The rugby league code showed that it was still struggling in its infancy to always organise itself properly with City only managing to field 12 players and the Auckland Star noted in its match report that several players “wore wrongly coloured uniforms”, and that the match was scheduled for 3:15 but kicked off 30 minutes late. The field was in a very muddy state and played in heavy rain, and after halftime some of the players did not return to the field. Also noticeable was the Newton and Eden result where Newton ran in 12 tries but only managed to convert one of them. Goal kicking in general was relatively poor and was shared amongst the teams with it not uncommon to see 3 or 4 players used.

| 22 June | North Shore | 10–5 | City | Devonport Domain |
| 3:15 | Try: E Rogers, Jim Griffin; Con: E Rogers, C Clark | | Try: William Moeki; Con: Alex Stanaway | Referee: T Cunningham |

| 22 June | Newton | 38–0 | Eden | Eden Park 1 |
| 3:00 | Try: Knowles 2, Alan Blakey 2, Ike Healy 4, Malcolm, Charles Brockliss, Adelbert Tobin 2 Con: Len Farrant | | | Referee: Bob Oliphant |

| 22 June | Ponsonby | 26–0 | Manukau | Eden Park 2 |
| 3:00 | Try: Horton 2, Matthews, McPherson, Charters, Skeates; Con: Skeates 2 Pen: Charles Webb 2 | | | Referee: Matt Hooper |

==== Round 7 ====
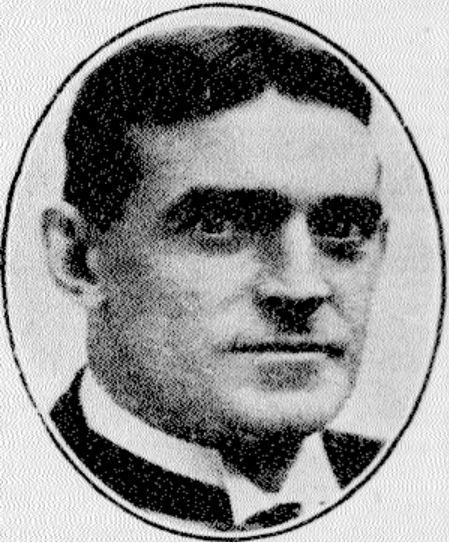
Archie Ferguson

Archie Ferguson refereed his first ever first grade game. He would go on to referee 50 first grade games and 8 representative games before becoming a prominent administrator in both refereeing and managing, including the New Zealand team. George Hunt who scored a try for City would also go on to become an administrator for the Auckland Rugby League in the 1920s.

| 29 June | Newton | 24–11 | North Shore | Eden Park 1 |
| 3:00 | Try: P Bush 2, Charles Brockliss, Cross, William Tobin, Adelbert Tobin; Con: Alan Blakey 2, George Smith | | Try: Alfred Jackson, C Clark, William Wynyard; Pen: E Rogers | Referee: T Cunningham |

| 29 June | Manukau | 14–3 | Eden | Eden Park |
| 3:00 | Try: Hughes, Griffiths, Ferguson, Hunt; Pen: Hughes | | Try: Bond | Referee: Archie Ferguson |

| 29 June | City | 14–12 | Ponsonby | Eden Park 2 |
| 3:00 | Try: George Hunt, William Moeki, George Harrison, Tom Avery; Con: Alex Stanaway | | Try: J Warner, R Roope; Con: Charles Webb, Sydney Cole; Pen: Charles Webb | Referee: Bob Oliphant |

==== Round 8 ====
It was reported that Arthur Francis the Newton player was now enroute to England where he was to join the Wigan club and play until 1919 when he would return to New Zealand and coach Newton in 1921. Charles Webb of the Ponsonby side was unable to play in their match with Eden after suffering from rheumatism. Remarkably little more than a month after being thrashed by Ponsonby by nearly 40 points, Eden managed to draw with them 9-9. John Henry Dufty made his debut for City. He had become famous for his remarkable kicking for the Thames rugby side in 1906 where he kicked 49 points in representative games sparking the cry "Give It To Dufty" at football grounds in New Zealand for many years to come. While he had really only had the one standout season he still kicked well at times.

| 6 July | Newton | 17–7 | City | Eden Park 1 |
| 3:00 | Try: P Bush 2, Adelbert Tobin 2, Charles Brockliss; Con: Len Farrant | | Try: Batten; Con: John Dufty; Pen: John Dufty | Referee: Angus Campbell |

| 6 July | Eden | 9–9 | Ponsonby | Eden Park 2 |
| 3:00 | Try: Bright, Emmet Kenealy, A Innes | | Try: Charters; Pen: Sydney Cole 3 | Referee: Matt Hooper |

| 6 July | North Shore | 9–12 | Manukau | Devonport Domain |
| 3:00 | Try: Ernie Bailey, George Seagar, C Clark | | Try: Griffiths 2, Hunt, Whyte | Referee: T Cunningham |

==== Round 9 ====
Newton's win over Ponsonby effectively decided the title in their favour. Ponsonby had a weakened side with William Cossey, Sid Riley, and Charles Webb all unavailable but filled their places with Jack Stanaway and George Bater, a Ponsonby rugby player. Newton were without William Tobin but George Gillett was available and led the side to victory.

| 13 July | Newton | 13–3 | Ponsonby | Eden Park 1 |
| 3:00 | Try: Ike Healey, Charles Brockliss 2 Con: George Gillett; Drop: George Gillett (mark) | | Try: Rowe | Referee: Bob Oliphant |

| 13 July | North Shore | 21–8 | Eden | Eden Park 2 |
| 3:00 | Try: Jim Griffin, Alfred Jackson, Stan Walters, Black, George Seagar; Con: Jim Griffin, Alfred Jackson, Jack Paul | | Try: Bright, Bob Biggs; Con: Bob Biggs | Referee: H Pullen |

| 13 July | City | 7–4 | Manukau | Ellerslie Reserve |
| 3:00 | Try: George Hunt; Con: John Dufty; Pen: John Dufty | | Pen: Hunt 2 | Referee: Angus Campbell |

==== Round 10 ====
Newton were one point ahead of Ponsonby in the championship and needed a win to secure the title. Manukau scored first and Newton only had a 5-3 lead at halftime but in the second half they totally dominated, putting on 29 points to 0 for a 34-3 win. It gave them their maiden championship. Eden upset City 25-5 though City fielded a weak team and lost two players to injury during the match.

| 20 July | Ponsonby | 13–13 | North Shore | Eden Park 1 |
| 3:00 | Try: A Cross, R Roope, Harry Fricker; Con: A Cross 2 | | Try: George Seagar, Frederick Gladding 2 Con: Alfred Jackson, Jack Paul | Referee: Angus Campbell |

| 20 July | Newton | 34–3 | Manukau | Eden Park 2 |
| 3:00 | Try: P Bush, George Gillett, Alan Blakey 2, Adelbert Tobin, George Smith, Cross, unattributed x 1 Con: George Gillett, Adelbert Tobin 4 | | Try: Hughes | Referee: T. Cunningham |

| 20 July | Eden | 25–5 | City | Eden Park 3 |
| 3:00 | Try: unattributed Con: unattributed | | Try: unattributed Con: unattributed | Referee: Matt Hooper |

=== Top scorers ===
There were multiple instances of points being unattributed. As such the following try scoring and point scoring lists are incomplete. Games and/or teams with unattributed points are as follows: North Shore try and penalty v Manukau (R3), North Shore 33 points v Eden (R4), Newton 1 try v Manukau (R10), Eden 25 points v City (R10), City 5 points v Eden (R10). This amounts to 82 points unattributed out of 773 points scored in total. With the New Zealand team touring Australia several players only played a handful of matches before departing which limited their scoring opportunities to 4 games.

Top point scorers
| No | Player | Team | Games | T | C | P | Pts |
|---|---|---|---|---|---|---|---|
| 1 | Charles Savory | Ponsonby | 4 | 7 | 5 | 1 | 33 |
| 1 | Charles Dunning | Ponsonby | 5 | 5 | 6 | 3 | 33 |
| 3 | Adelbert Tobin | Newton | 5 | 6 | 4 | 0 | 26 |
| 4 | Arthur Francis | Newton | 4 | 5 | 4 | 1 | 25 |
| 5 | Ike Healey | Newton | 6 | 7 | 1 | 0 | 23 |
| 5 | Billy Dervan | Newton | 4 | 5 | 4 | 0 | 23 |
| 7 | Alan Blakey | Newton | 10 | 6 | 2 | 0 | 22 |
| 8 | Don Kenealy | Eden | 4 | 2 | 5 | 1 | 18 |

Top try scorers
| No | Player | Team | Games | Tries |
|---|---|---|---|---|
| 1 | Ike Healey | Newton | 6 | 7 |
| 2 | Adelbert Tobin | Newton | 5 | 6 |
| 2 | Alan Blakey | Newton | 10 | 6 |
| 4 | Billy Dervan | Newton | 4 | 5 |
| 4 | Charles Brockliss | Newton | 9 | 5 |
| 4 | George Hunt | City | 9 | 5 |
| 4 | P Bush | Newton | 4 | 5 |
| 4 | William Mincham | Ponsonby | 8 | 5 |

== Lower grades and exhibition matches ==
=== Second Grade ===
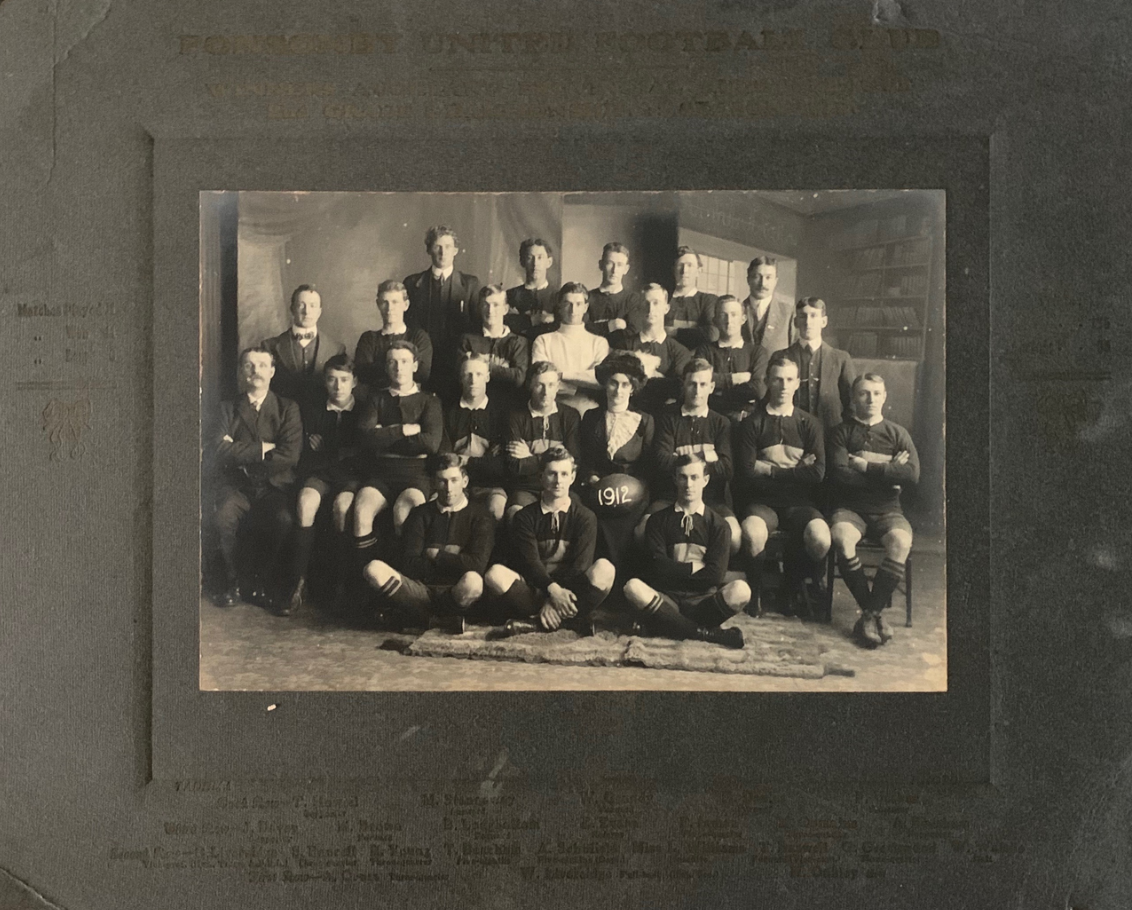
The unbeaten Ponsonby side which won all of their 14 games.

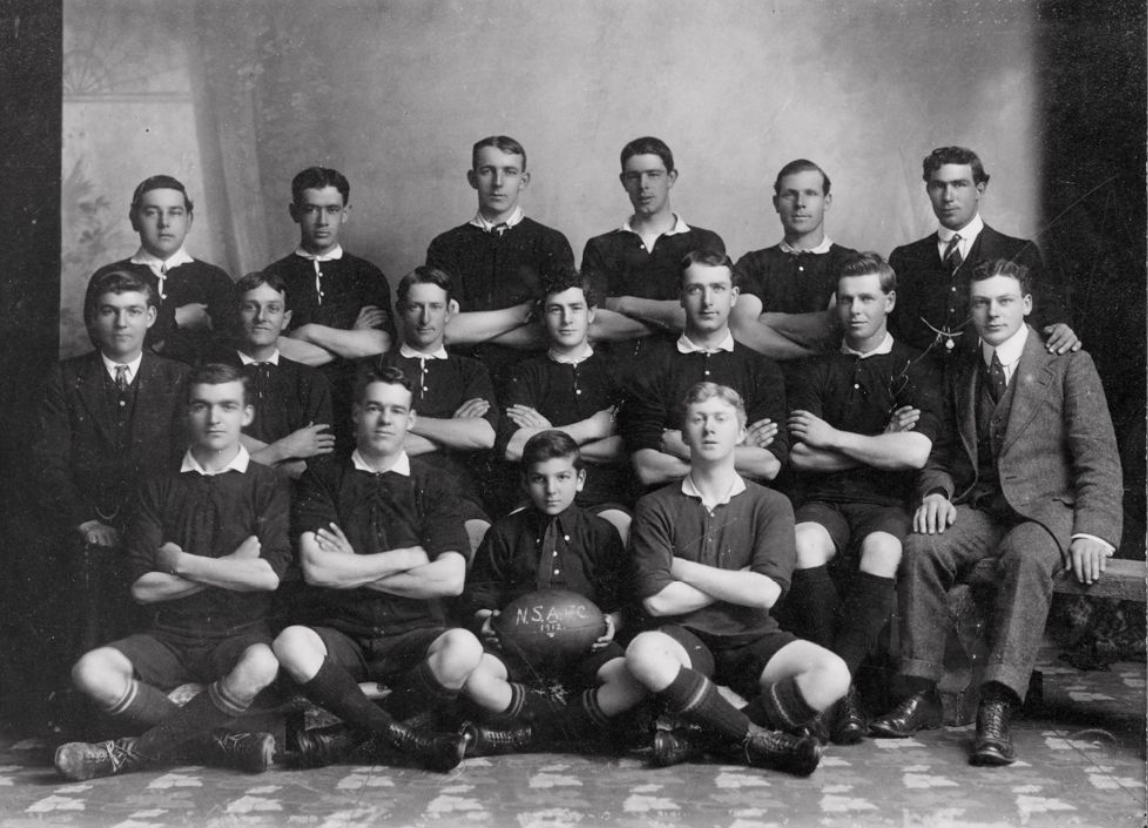
North Shore 2nd grade team. Edward Vincent Fox is 3rd from the left in the back row. The first grade Fox Memorial Shield was named after him.

The Points table at the end of the first round (which was published) and additional known results. Only 19 scores were reported therefore the points for and against are only tallies from those matches. The table also included the championship final which saw Ponsonby defeat Otahuhu 15-9.

| Team | Pld | W | D | L | F | A | Pts |
|---|---|---|---|---|---|---|---|
| Ponsonby United | 11 | 11 | 0 | 0 | 128 | 35 | 22 |
| Otahuhu United | 9 | 6 | 0 | 3 | 105 | 51 | 12 |
| North Shore Albions | 9 | 6 | 0 | 3 | 53 | 36 | 12 |
| Northcote Ramblers | 9 | 4 | 0 | 5 | 8 | 38 | 8 |
| City Rovers | 9 | 3 | 0 | 6 | 41 | 70 | 6 |
| Ellerslie United | 9 | 2 | 0 | 7 | 9 | 69 | 4 |
| Hobsonville Pirates | 7 | 1 | 0 | 6 | 18 | 57 | 2 |
| Newton Rangers | 7 | 0 | 0 | 7 | 9 | 15 | 0 |

=== Third Grade ===
Ponsonby B beat Ponsonby A in the final match 17-5 to win the competition. There were two rounds of matches played prior to the competition beginning. Only 8 rounds were played (7 matches for each team) and only 8 scores were reported, including none from Northcote's games. The standings were published after 7 rounds however which showed the teams wins and losses to that point. As a result the points for and against only includes those reported.

| Team | Pld | W | D | L | F | A | Pts |
|---|---|---|---|---|---|---|---|
| Ponsonby United B | 7 | 7 | 0 | 0 | 107 | 17 | 14 |
| Ponsonby United A | 7 | 5 | 0 | 2 | 25 | 21 | 10 |
| Manukau Rovers | 6 | 4 | 0 | 2 | 0 | 8 | 8 |
| Eden Ramblers | 6 | 3 | 0 | 3 | 11 | 29 | 6 |
| North Shore Albions | 6 | 2 | 0 | 4 | 9 | 51 | 4 |
| City Rovers | 6 | 1 | 0 | 5 | 5 | 31 | 2 |
| Northcote Ramblers | 6 | 0 | 0 | 6 | 0 | 0 | 0 |

=== Fourth Grade ===
The competition was played over 7 rounds. Only 16 match scores were reported out of 26 matches played. The for and against as a result are incomplete as are the win loss records.

| Team | Pld | W | D | L | F | A | Pts |
|---|---|---|---|---|---|---|---|
| North Shore Albions | 5 | 5 | 0 | 0 | 60 | 9 | 10 |
| Otahuhu United | 5 | 4 | 0 | 1 | 83 | 22 | 8 |
| Ellerslie United | 5 | 2 | 1 | 2 | 54 | 26 | 5 |
| Ponsonby United | 4 | 2 | 0 | 2 | 14 | 29 | 4 |
| Manukau | 3 | 1 | 1 | 1 | 18 | 12 | 3 |
| Eden Ramblers | 4 | 1 | 0 | 3 | 26 | 46 | 2 |
| Newton Rangers | 4 | 1 | 0 | 3 | 6 | 30 | 2 |
| City Rovers | 4 | 0 | 0 | 4 | 2 | 89 | 0 |

=== Exhibition match ===
| | Date | | Score | | Score | Venue |
| Exhibition Match | 24 Aug | Manukau | 10 | Mangere Native Team | 3 | Onehunga Recreation Ground, Onehunga |

== Representative season ==
=== Auckland v Thames-Goldfields ===
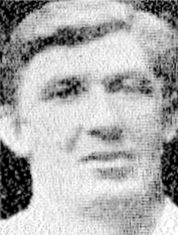
Morgan Hayward who played in the Thames-Goldfields forwards. His brother Harold Hayward came on as a substitution.

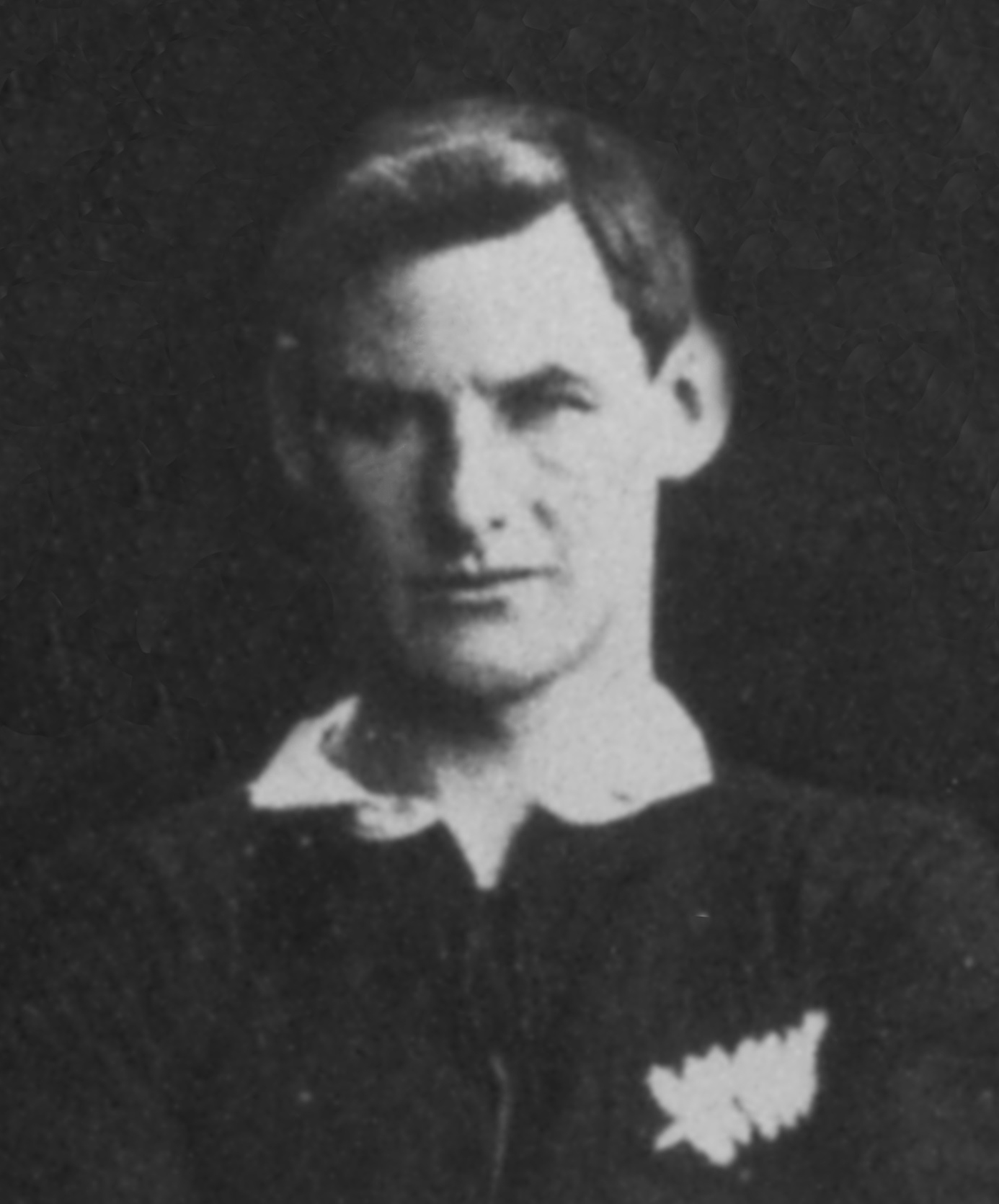
Arthur Francis

Rugby League had only just begun to be played in the Thames the weekend prior to this match with a Thames side playing a match against a Goldfields side at Shortland (Shortland was one of the two settlements which merged to become Thames and was located at the south of the town). Thames won the match 5-0. The Auckland representative team to play Thames-Goldfields was a considerably weakened one. Many players named originally in the New Zealand Herald did not actually make the trip and the match day side as reported in the Thames News was a very different one with many players on debut. Players initially selected but unable to play were Don Kenealy, Arthur Hardgrave, Alan Blakey, Alfred Jackson, Charles Savory, Bob Mitchell, Joe Bennett, Harry Fricker, Alex Stanaway, and Jim Rukutai. McPherson made his debut for Auckland after previously having played rugby union for Thames. It was his only appearance for Auckland. The weather was "unfavourable" earlier in the day and as a result many people from Auckland did not make the train journey to the match but there was still a "satisfactory attendance". The game was described as "fast and brilliant throughout". In the first half the play was "chiefly confined to the Goldfields area" though they did have periods forcing the play into Auckland's territory. On of these efforts was successful in securing Dillamore a try in the corner to open the scoring. Later in the half Auckland began to dominate more as the home side tired and they scored two tries to Bob Mitchell, and Malcolm, which were both converted by Arthur Francis to give them a 10-3 lead at the break. In the second half the Thames-Goldfields side improved "considerably" and were "especially clever in getting the ball from the scrum". E. Griffen at halfback created opportunities and from a good passing run enabled Kidd to score but it went unconverted. Both teams engaged in "some brilliant and fast play" and a good goal was kicked by Francis, and then shortly after J. Dufty kicked two goals from marks to narrow the score to 12-10 to Auckland. From this point the local side "made the game willing" and kept the play in the Auckland end. Auckland were defending well but the home side "was not to be denied, and two more tries were secured by Hyde and Ormsby" towards the end of the game with Hyde converting one to give them an 18-12 victory. The match which "appeared to be highly enjoyed by the spectators" was controlled by George Gillett. In comments from the Thames Star they said "Morgan Hayward is sure to be included in the New Zealand team to tour New South Wales. "King" Hyde, Ormsby, Thomas McClymont, and Dillamore also played well, while Griffen showed considerable trickiness at half".

| 18 May | Thames-Goldfields | 18–12 (3-10) | Auckland | Thames |
| 3:00 | Try: Ormsby 2, Dillamore, Hyde; Con: Hyde; Drop: Jos B. Dufty 2 | | Try: Bob Mitchell, Malcolm; Con: Arthur Francis 2 Pen: Arthur Francis | Referee: George Gillett, line umpires: C. Robert and Winder |

Team details

| FB | 1 | J. Dufty |
| WG | 2 | Tukey |
| CE | 3 | Dillamore |
| CE | 4 | Edgar Hayward |
| WG | 5 | Jos B. Dufty |
| FE | 6 | Thomas McClymont |
| HB | 7 | E. Griffen |
| PR | 8 | H. Manning |
| HK | 9 | Ormsby |
| PR | 10 | Morgan Hayward |
| SR | 11 | Kidd |
| SR | 12 | Tom Brownlee |
| LF | 13 | 'King' Hyde |
Emergency: Harold Hayward (came on for Brownlee due to an injury)
Emergency: Capill
Emergency: Winder

| FB | 1 | Harry Childs |
| WG | 2 | Ike Dealy |
| CE | 3 | Fraser |
| CE | 4 | George Harrison |
| WG | 5 | Bob Mitchell |
| FE | 6 | Stan Weston |
| HB | 7 | Arthur Carlaw |
| PR | 8 | G Warner |
| HK | 9 | Arthur Francis |
| PR | 10 | McPherson |
| SR | 11 | Malcolm |
| SR | 12 | Tom Avery |
| LF | 13 | William Capill |

=== Auckland v New Zealand ===
George Seagar who scored a try and kicked a conversion for Auckland.

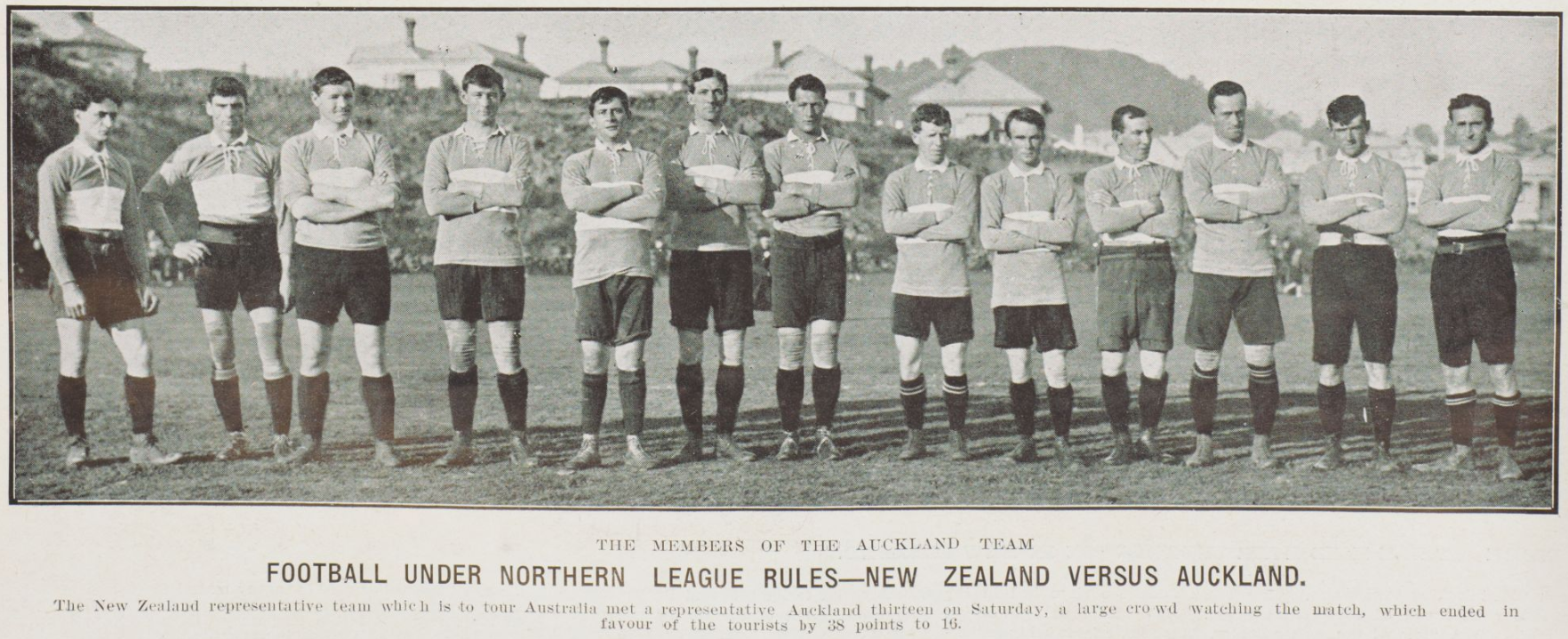
Ernie Asher, George Seagar, Jim Griffen, G. Lambert, George Smith, Bob Mitchell, Alex Stanaway, Alfred Jackson, Don Kenealy, Harry Childs, Harry Fricker, D. (Ike) Healy, and Alan Blakey

Sid Riley the former Australian rugby international who was playing club football in Auckland for Ponsonby at the time was listed to play for Auckland in the match. However he played for New Zealand instead. Originally the Hayward brothers (Morgan and Harold) were named to play for New Zealand however with their Thames side playing the curtain-raiser against Auckland B they decided to represent them instead. The weather conditions were described as "ideal for the winter game - fine and bracing, with no wind to speak of" with a record crowd estimated at 5,000. Arthur Francis won the toss from Auckland captain, Alan Blakey and G. Lambert kicked off for Auckland. Auckland were playing into a light northerly wind with the sun in their eyes. Their forwards took the ball forward through Jim Griffen and Alex Stanaway into New Zealand territory where Alfred Jackson got the ball away to George Smith but he was tackled and Francis and Jim Rukutai brought the ball back to halfway on their toe but their kicking just led to Don Kenealy taking a mark. The ball moved about the field and then New Zealand received a free kick from which Francis took but just missed with a "fine" effort. Play stayed around the Auckland end and they were penalised for obstruction in a scrum with Francis converting this effort to give New Zealand a 2-0 lead. New Zealand went on to attack through Arthur Carlaw, and George Bradley but Kenealy intercepted and kicked up field. Lance Moir marked and kicked deep with the New Zealand forwards following fast but Ernie Asher "picked up smartly from the loose and, dodging quickly, got clear and set up off the line at a great pace. He sent in to Harry Fricker, who put the ball to toe and carried it on to the New Zealand goal line". A scrum eventuated and Auckland received a penalty for unfair tactics and Kenealy had a long shot from near the touchline but the ball dropped just short. The backs for both sides made efforts to score but eventually it was Lambert who led the Auckland forwards into New Zealand's 25 and a free kick saw Alex Stanaway kick a goal to level the scores at 2-2. From the kick off Francis and Charles Dunning carried play into Auckland's 25. Jackson got the ball away to George Smith who side-stepped Bradley and sent the ball to Blakey and he made a "fine run by transferring to Fricker, who had been in attendance, and the latter had no difficulty in making his way across to score near the corner". Stanaway's conversion from wide out was unsuccessful. From the kickoff Sid Riley got possession in the loose and cut in and across and passed to Carlaw who made a break and passed to Bill Kelly and he sent on to Jim Gilmour and he ran in behind the posts untouched and converted his own try. Play was described as "very exciting" and the New Zealand forwards were "giving a great exhibition" with Francis, Rukutai, and Dunning "got going from halfway" and "short snappy passes" saw them get into Auckland's territory. They stayed here for a time but Auckland broke out through their forwards. Later Bob Mitchell with a "bustling run" broke through and passed to Fricker who sent it to Smith and he was bumped out at the corner. New Zealand kicked clear from the scrum through Charles Webb and Carlaw tried to throw a long pass to Bradley but it was intercepted by Healy and he "raced through the New Zealand backs, swerved past Moir and evaded Webb, who was in pursuit, and grounded the ball beneath the posts amid roars of applause" and George Seagar converted to put Auckland 10-7 ahead. New Zealand went on to the attack and a free kick gave them a chance at goal but Gilmour's kick went wide. New Zealand attacked from a scrum but Auckland kicked out and halftime came with them ahead 10-7. Rukutai started the second half and Kenealy kicked to New Zealand with Webb running up field and passing to Carlaw who was caught. Their forwards took the ball ahead and Rukutai passed to Francis and the ball was moved through all the New Zealand forwards hands and Gilmour finished things off "by coming up fast from the three-quarter" after taking a pass from Robert Irvine and grounding it near the posts however the kick missed. Immediately after Kelly snapped up the ball from the loose and sprinted up field and passed to Bradley who made a further break and transferred to Gilmour and he side stepped Harry Childs and scored with Bradley converting to give New Zealand a 15-10 lead. Kelly got the New Zealand backs going again and sent it to Webb to Carlaw to Bradley to Francis who put the ball on the ground and kicked ahead with Webb racing up to gather the ball and score near the corner. Bradley's kick from wide out missed. From a scrum at halfway Webb came round fast and beat Jackson and passed to Carlaw to Brady, to Kelly, to Gilmour who kicked up field. Gilmour followed hard and beat Kenealy, Ike Healy, and Harry Childs in the race for the ball and scored near the posts but Francis missed the conversion. New Zealand was now totally dominant and Francis picked the ball up from loose play and sent the ball to Rukutai who sprinted up the line and passed to Riley who had a clear run in to score. Francis took a difficult shot at goal and was unsuccessful but they now had a 24-10 lead. Auckland tried to improve things but from a scrum win Jackson passed to Asher and he fumbled the ball and then threw a difficult pass to Blakey but Bradley "cut in and intercepted, and running away from the Auckland backs, went over near the posts" with Francis failing to convert once more. Webb and Carlaw were heavily involved in a passing movement which looked like scoring but Childs stopped it. The Auckland forwards set off down the field and soon after Jackson got the ball out from a ruck to Asher to Healy and although he was crowded he raced straight down the line to score but the kick failed. Both teams were tiring and from a scrum Webb got the ball to Carlaw to Evans to Dunning and on to King who ran across in the corner and Bradley landed "a beautiful goal". After the kickoff play stayed around midfield and then Asher got the ball from a ruck and ran down the center of the field and sent a long pass to Seagar who "galloped around the New Zealand backs, eluded Francis" and scored near the corner but once again their kick failed. For New Zealand, Bradley set their backs going by passing to Dunning who gave the ball to Francis who passed again to Bradley and he scored under the posts but they missed the conversion. Then soon after the kickoff the New Zealand backs made a passing movement and Gilmour scored with Dunning converting on the full time bell to give New Zealand a 38-16 win.

| 15 June | Auckland | 16–38 (10-7) | New Zealand | Eden Park, Auckland |
| 3:00 | Try: Harry Fricker, Ike Healy 2, George Seagar; Con: Alex Stanaway 0/1, George Seagar 1/1, Unknown 0/2; Pen: Alex Stanaway 1/1, Don Kenealy 0/1 | | Try: Jim Gilmour 5, Charles Webb, Sid Riley, George Bradley 2, Cecil King; Con: Jim Gilmour 1/1, George Bradley 1/3, Charles Dunning 2/2, Arthur Francis 0/3, Unknown 0/1; Pen: Arthur Francis 1/2, Jim Gilmour 0/1 | Attendance: 5,000; Referee: T. Cunningham (Knox and Parker line umpires) |

Team details

| FB | 1 | Harry Childs |
| WG | 2 | Don Kenealy |
| CE | 3 | Ike Healy |
| CE | 4 | Ernie Asher |
| WG | 5 | Alan Blakey |
| FE | 6 | George Smith |
| HB | 7 | Alfred Jackson |
| PR | 8 | Alex Stanaway |
| HK | 9 | Harry Fricker |
| PR | 10 | Jim Griffen |
| SR | 11 | Bob Mitchell |
| SR | 12 | George Seagar |
| LF | 13 | G. Lambert |
Emergency: George Harrison
Emergency: Dick Roope
Emergency: Stan Walters

| FB | 1 | Lance Moir |
| WG | 2 | Sid Riley |
| CE | 3 | Bill Kelly |
| CE | 4 | Jim Gilmour |
| WG | 5 | Arthur Carlaw |
| FE | 6 | George Bradley |
| HB | 7 | Charles Webb |
| PR | 8 | Arthur Francis (captain) |
| HK | 9 | Dave Evans |
| PR | 10 | Jim Rukutai |
| SR | 11 | Cecil King |
| SR | 12 | Charles Dunning |
| LF | 13 | Robert Irvine |

=== Auckland B v Thames ===
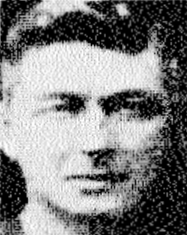
Harold Hayward, who played for Thames.

Auckland won the toss and the Thames side filled with miners kicked off against the wind. The Thames side featured several New Zealand representative players including Barney Winder, Tom Brownlee, Morgan Hayward, and his brother Harold Hayward. Brownlee died after a "long illness" at his home in 1915 aged just 29. Tom Haddon who had debuted for North Shore in 1910 secured the kick from Jos B. Dufty. Haddon later played for Grafton Athletic (1914-15), and City Rovers ((1918-19) before being selected for New Zealand in 1919 aged 33. The Auckland forwards followed up fast from the kickoff but the heavier Thames forward pack rallied through Manning and Morgan Hayward who took play back to halfway and from offside play by Malcolm (Auckland), Dufty took a shot at goal but missed the posts from a "fine" effort. Played moved about the field for a time before a scrum for a knock-on saw the ball go out to Skeats who "whipped out to McPherson" who kicked short and Thames caught the ball for a mark with Dufty kicking the goal to give them a 2-0 lead. From the kickoff Smith took the ball from the loose for Thames and kicked to Stan Weston "who set off up the field in fine style, and side stepping Dinkley and Barney Winder, made a fine opening, and passed on to Hickey, who was upset on the line by Dufty who relieved with a powerful kick". Thames tried to push play down field but struggled against the Auckland backs and then Devell for Thames was offside but C. Clark missed the penalty attempt at goal. Thames forwards then worked well together and Houghton on the wing secured the ball in loose play and ran in under the posts with Dufty converting to give Thames a 7-0 lead. Clark took the kickoff and Houghton intercepted and cut down the side line before passing to Dunkley who scored and Dufty's conversion extended the score line to 12-0. Barnie Winder tried to set the Thames backs in motion but then Dick Roope got Auckland B going and a try seemed likely before Winder stopped things. Auckland received a free kick for off-side play but Skeates attempt went wide. The Thames forwards pushed play down field but then Auckland retaliated through Hickey and Skeates set up a run passing to Bill Mincham and after going through other hands Smith took the ball from a mark but Mincham missed the attempt at goal. From a scrum near halfway the ball came out to Skeates and was sent to Roope who passed to Smith and then went back to Roope and he scored with the ball at his feet and Weston fell on it to score. George Smith missed the conversion. From this point the Thames forwards dominated and Dufty had a long shot for goal from a penalty and fell short. Weston carried the ball down field and centered the ball with a Thames player trying to force but the ball went through his legs and "McPherson, by a leap-frog feat, got to the ball and scored". Weston then missed the conversion. Towards the end Hayward took a mark but Winder's shot at goal went wide. Both forward packs pushed hard at each others end but the game ended with Thames ahead 12-6.

| 15 June | Auckland B | 6-12 | Thames | Eden Park |
| 1:30 | Try: Stan Weston, McPherson; Con: George Smith 0/1, Stan Weston 0/1; Pen: Skeates 0/1, C. Clark 0/1, Bill Mincham 0/1 (Mark) | | Try: Houghton, Dunkley; Con: Jos B. Dufty 2/2; Pen: Jos B. Dufty 0/1, Jos B. Dufty 1/1, Harold Hayward 0/1 | Attendance: 5,000; Referee: Angus Campbell (Ferguson and Mulholland line umpires) |

Team details

| FB | 1 | Skeates |
| WG | 2 | George Smith |
| CE | 3 | Dick Roope |
| CE | 4 | Stan Weston |
| WG | 5 | Tom Haddon |
| FE | 6 | Bill Mincham |
| HB | 7 | Hickey |
| PR | 8 | Malcolm |
| HK | 9 | William Mackrell |
| PR | 10 | McPherson |
| SR | 11 | Stan Walters |
| SR | 12 | C. Clark |
| LF | 13 | Harold Roy Denize |
Emergency: George Harrison
Emergency: Hunt
Emergency: Brockliss
Emergency: Bailey
Emergency: Fred Gladding

| FB | 1 | Jos B. Dufty |
| WG | 2 | Houghton |
| CE | 3 | Currie |
| CE | 4 | Devell |
| WG | 5 | Barney Winder |
| FE | 6 | George Winder |
| HB | 7 | Taylor |
| PR | 8 | Manning |
| HK | 9 | Tom Brownlee |
| PR | 10 | Morgan Hayward |
| SR | 11 | Dunlop |
| SR | 12 | Harold Hayward |
| LF | 13 | Dunkley |

=== Auckland v Hawke's Bay (Northern Union Challenge Cup) ===
The match was Auckland's first defence of the Northern Union Challenge Cup for the season. The trophy later became known as the Rugby League Cup. The Auckland team featured Harold Hayward who was from the Thames district which was affiliated to Auckland Rugby League. He had been a member of the combined Thames-Goldfields team which had played Auckland earlier in the season. Hawke's Bay was without the services of winger S. Karaitiana, so J. Bain was moved from fullback to replace him and Fulford came into the side at fullback. There was a crowd of 4,500 at Victoria Park to watch the match on a ground described as "heavy". Auckland won the toss and P. McCarthy kicked off for Hawke's Bay. The game opened well for the visitors and Henry Duvall kicked a penalty goal before ten minutes had passed after he had missed one shortly before. Play moved up and down the field but the Auckland players "were showing a tendency to play off-side" and Duvall had another shot at goal but it went wide. The ball went back to the other end and a Hawke's Bay player was caught offside and Arthur Hardgrave kicked a goal for Auckland to level the scores at 2-2. Auckland's forwards, headed by Jim Rukutai, "who was playing a splendid game, worked play upfield" and Charles Webb passed to Arthur Carlaw who sent it on to Alan Blakey but he was unable to break through. They then had another passing rush with D. (Ike) Healy, Don Kenealy, and Stan Weston involved. Weston was brought down near the corner after a determined run for the try line. A scrum followed and Webb at halfback sent it on to Carlaw, to Blakey but he dropped the pass when he had a "fair chance to score". After some more attacking play by Auckland failed, Hawke's Bay had cleared with a kick by wing J. McBride but Healy marked and Hardgrave attempted a goal but his "fine effort" went wide. J. Johnston, the Hawke's Bay prop followed up a kick from a free kick and secured the ball but lacked support and was collared. Auckland then returned on to the attack and Weston passed to Webb and he moved it on to Blakey who was stopped with things looking dangerous for the visitors. A scrum came near the try line and Webb passed to Carlaw who was tackled but broke away and scored close to the posts and Hardrave converted. After the kickoff Hawke's Bay attacked well through Duvall who "had been playing a splendid game" secured in the open and passed to Glen Barclay (Glenville Te Punga o Te Arawa Barclay) and he sent it to J. Bain who dropped the ball. Hawke's Bay had scrums near the line and then Duvall had a shot at goal for a breach of the rules and it went high and he followed up but Auckland forced. Eventually Webb gained possession for Auckland and kicked down field and gaining the ball again he passed to Charles Dunning who knocked on and a chance to score was lost. From the resulting scrum Bob Mitchell dived over to score with Hardgrave's conversion unsuccessful. A while later Hawke's Bay committed an offense and D. Healy took a shot but it missed and went over the line with the visitors forcing. The play switched ends multiple times as each team attacked well but could not convert their position. Auckland forwards "asserted themselves" and Harold Hayward finished off a determined rush by forcing his way over with Hardgrave converting "from a difficult angle". Halftime came with Auckland in front 15 to 2. From the restart Hawke's Bay attacked continuously in several efforts involving Barclay, Duvall, Bain, and their captain, E. Kelly. With the last effort Kelly took the ball from a kick and made a break when he passed to Duvall and he transferred the ball to Johnston who "made a clever run and scored in a fair position" but Duvall failed with his conversion. Hawke's Bay secured the ball from the kick off and pushed forward but the Auckland forwards took play back to the visitors twenty five and George Seagar passed to Blakey who made an opening and passed to Rukutai who "set off at full speed" and scored between the posts however Hardgrave hit the crossbar with his conversion. Hawke's Bay's forward were now tiring but they managed to get in good field position after Barclay started a passing rush from his own end. Frank Barclay took a shot at goal from a Duvall mark but the ball stayed low. Hawke's Bay attacked continuously and after a scrum Auckland's five eighth Arthur Carlaw received a nose injury and had to leave the field. The visitors defence was starting to weaken and Auckland scored through Rukutai after it had passed through several hands though Webb's conversion missed. For Hawke's Bay Kelly got the ball in open field and passed to Duvall, and he was blocked but passed back to Kelly who passed back to Duvall who beat the Auckland defence and scored in a "fair position". Taking the kick himself he missed and the score was 21-8 in favour of Auckland. The Auckland forwards took charge with the Hayward brothers heavily involved and eventually Bob Mitchell went over to score though another Auckland conversion went wide through Hardgrave. Auckland came close to scoring again through Kenealy and Hayward but their points came through a penalty goal by Charles Dunning. Dunning had another penalty attempt soon after which went wide. Hawke's Bay had not given up and J. Johnston started a "fine dribbling rush, and McCarthy, following up fast, lost a splendid opportunity to score by slipping over at the crucial moment". Duvall, who had been playing at five eighth was kicked on the leg and was moved back to fullback with Fulford switching up to centre-three quarter. The visitors continued to attack but play finished in neutral territory.

| 27 July | Auckland | 26–8 (15-2) | Hawke’s Bay | Victoria Park |
| 3:00 | Try: Arthur Carlaw, Bob Mitchell 2, Harold Hayward, Jim Rukutai 2 Con: Arthur Hardgrave 2/4, D. Healy 0/1, Charles Webb 0/1; Pen: Arthur Hardgrave 1/1 & 0/1 (mark), Charles Dunning 1/1 | | Try: Jim Johnson, Henry Duvall; Con: Henry Duvall 0/2; Pen: Henry Duvall 1/3, Frank Barclay 0/1 (mark) | Attendance: 4,500; Referee: T. Cunningham |

Team details

| FB | 1 | Arthur Hardgrave |
| WG | 2 | Don Kenealy |
| CE | 3 | Stan Weston |
| CE | 4 | Alan Blakey |
| WG | 5 | Ike Healy |
| FE | 6 | Arthur Carlaw (off injured) |
| HB | 7 | Charles Webb |
| PR | 8 | Harold Hayward |
| HK | 9 | Charles Dunning |
| PR | 10 | Jim Rukutai |
| SR | 11 | Bob Mitchell |
| SR | 12 | George Seagar |
| LF | 13 | Morgan Hayward |
Emergency: Dick Roope
Emergency: Jim Griffen

| FB | 1 | Fulford |
| WG | 2 | J. Bain |
| CE | 3 | Frank Barclay |
| CE | 4 | E. Kelly (captain) |
| WG | 5 | J. McBride |
| FE | 6 | Henry Duvall |
| HB | 7 | H. Fowler |
| PR | 8 | J. Johnston |
| HK | 9 | Glen Barclay |
| PR | 10 | H. Swain |
| SR | 11 | H. Kani |
| SR | 12 | P. McCarthy |
| LF | 13 | A. Taylor |
Emergency: S. Karaitiana

=== Auckland B v Hamilton ===
Auckland sent a B team to play at Steele Park in Hamilton on the same day that they full representative side was playing Hawke's Bay in Auckland. There was a "good crowd" in attendance, and they saw the home team start well and lead 7-3 at halftime. However, in the second half they tired and by the end of the game Auckland B was "running over them" to win 20-12. Hamilton opened the scoring with a good penalty goal by T. Hughes. Then some "smart and interesting play followed" and Alfred Jackson broke away from halfway and scored to give Auckland B a 3-2 lead. Hamilton responded with Agnew scoring a try and field converted for the 7-3 lead which they held until the break. Hamilton were still aggressive in the second half and their forward Harrison scored a try with Field converting once again. Things now changed with the Auckland backs getting "into their stride" according to the Waikato Argus newspaper. Edward Lambert scored but C. Clark missed the conversion. Bob Biggs, the Eden Ramblers winger then scored a try but once more the conversion was missed. William Tobin scored Auckland's fourth try, and his brother Adelbert Tobin converted it. Adelbert Tobin then scored a try of his own which went unconverted to give the visitors their 20-12 win in a six try to two performance. It was said that but for the excellent defensive effort from Hogg and Whitmore Auckland would have scored at least four more tries in the second half. Early in the game Skeats for Auckland broke "several ribs" and had to leave the field with a replacement coming on, most likely William Tobin as he was in the reserves and later scored a try. Then near the end of the match another Auckland player sprained a toe and left the field leaving Auckland a player short.

| 27 July | Hamilton | 12-20 (7-3) | Auckland B | Steele Park, Hamilton |
| 3:00 | Try: Agnew, Harrison; Con: Field 2/2; Pen: Hughes 1/1 | | Try: Alfred Jackson, Edward Lambert, Bob Biggs, William Tobin, George Smith, Adelbert Tobin; Con: Adelbert Tobin 1/1, C. Clark 0/1, Unknown 0/4 |

Team details

| FB | 1 | Taylor |
| WG | 2 | Hogg |
| CE | 3 | McKinder |
| CE | 4 | T. Hughes |
| WG | 5 | Butler |
| FE | 6 | Field |
| HB | 7 | Hemming |
| PR | 8 | Whitmore |
| HK | 9 | Wells |
| PR | 10 | Coe |
| SR | 11 | C. Stapleton |
| SR | 12 | Agnew |
| LF | 13 | Harrison |
Emergency: Mills
Emergency: Jackson
Emergency: S. Hughes
Emergency: L. Munro
Emergency: Birnie
Emergency: McIntosh

| FB | 1 | Skeates (off injured) |
| WG | 2 | Fred Gladding |
| CE | 3 | Adelbert Tobin |
| CE | 4 | George Smith |
| WG | 5 | Bob Biggs |
| FE | 6 | Griffiths |
| HB | 7 | Alfred Jackson |
| PR | 8 | C. Clark |
| HK | 9 | Alex Stanaway |
| PR | 10 | Edward Lambert |
| SR | 11 | Percy Pullen |
| SR | 12 | Charles Brockliss |
| LF | 13 | Charters |
Emergency: William Tobin (on for Skeates)
Emergency: A. Cross
Emergency: Innes
Emergency: Stan Walters
Emergency: Bush
Emergency: Dunkley

=== Auckland v Rotorua ===
Frank Woodward, the Rotorua outside centre.

On 3 August Auckland played Rotorua in Rotorua. There was a "large attendance" and the Auckland backs opened up the game from the kickoff passing well, but Rotorua stopped them. However soon after William Tobin scored the first try after a passing rush with Arthur Hardgrave converting. The play was very fast in the first half with Auckland holding the advantage. However in the second half the Auckland forwards were beaten for the ball continuously which hampered their backs. Shortly after the Tobin try Charles Webb crossed the line but the conversion missed and Auckland now led 8-0. When play resumed Hatu, the Rotorua front rower took a kick centred by Fitzgerald his team mate on the wing and scored their first try with the conversion missing. Auckland were then awarded a penalty and Hargrave kicked "a nice goal". Rawson then scored a try for Rotorua but Frank Woodward's kick missed. Then in loose play Woodward picked up the ball and beat several defenders to score the best try of the game but Rawson failed with the conversion. Riki Papakura was said to have given a fine display at fullback for Rotorua, while Rawson and Woodward at wing three-quarter and centre three-quarter respectively also played good games.

| 3 August | Rotorua | 9–10 (0-8) | Auckland | Rotorua |
| 3:00 | Try: Hatu, Rawson, Frank Woodward; Con: Frank Woodward 0/1, Rawson 0/1, Unknown 0/1 | | Try: William Tobin, Charles Webb; Con: Arthur Hardgrave 1/1, Unknown 0/1; Pen: Arthur Hardgrave 1/1 | Referee: Bob Oliphant |

Team details

| FB | 1 | Arthur Hardgrave |
| WG | 2 | Stan Weston |
| CE | 3 | William Tobin |
| CE | 4 | Ike Healy |
| WG | 5 | Dick Roope |
| FE | 6 | Alan Blakey |
| HB | 7 | Charles Webb |
| PR | 8 | Jim Griffen |
| HK | 9 | Alex Stanaway |
| PR | 10 | Harry Fricker |
| SR | 11 | Bob Mitchell |
| SR | 12 | George Seagar |
| LF | 13 | Edward Lambert |
Emergency: George Smith
Emergency: Percy Pullen

| FB | 1 | Tiki Papakura |
| WG | 2 | Rawson |
| CE | 3 | Frank Woodward |
| CE | 4 | Fitzgerald |
| WG | 5 | B Harp |
| FE | 6 | Rukingi Reke |
| HB | 7 | Hastete |
| PR | 8 | Hatu |
| HK | 9 | William Walker |
| PR | 10 | Kira |
| SR | 11 | Gordon |
| SR | 12 | Runciman |
| LF | 13 | Johnston |

=== Auckland B v Lower Waikato ===
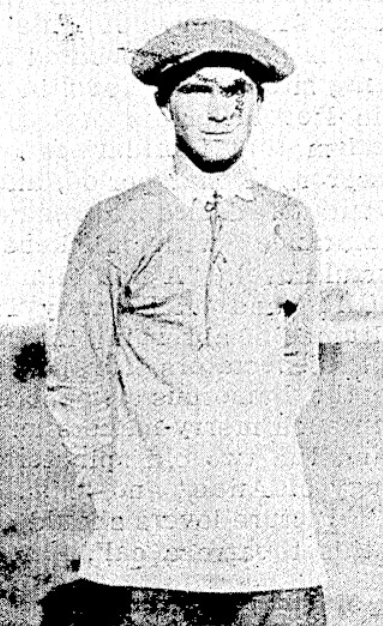
Don Kenealy from the Eden Ramblers club who scored one of Auckland B's three tries on the right wing.

The match between Auckland and Lower Waikato at Eden Park was officially an Auckland B team but there were a number of players who would ordinarily be in an A team or had represented New Zealand already. They included Ernie Asher, Don Kenealy, Alfred Jackson, Charles Dunning, Jim Rukutai, and Charles Brockliss. The ground was "sodden" before play began and then a shower followed soon after making the ball difficult to handle. Lower Waikato kicked off against the sun and wind and immediately went on to the attack. Their forwards followed up "splendidly, and after a brief struggle near the home team's goal Neild dashed over and scored", with H. Henderson missing with the conversion. Heavy rain was now falling at the restart. Both teams struggled to gain any ascendancy for a considerable period. The advantage was falling with whichever team could dribble the ball best along the ground. Eventually Jackson, George Smith, and Billy Curran "were instrumental in placing Auckland in an attacking position, but once again Curran was tackled before parting with the ball". Then the Waikato forwards through H. Henderson and F. Hall attacked Auckland's line and Hall had two attempts at goal which missed. Ernie Asher attacked well with a long run but kicked and Raynor had time to force the ball. Waikato were winning the ball from the scrums but the backs didn't pass enough and then Auckland responded with a try to A. Cross with Charles Dunning failing to convert. The try had come about after Jim Rukutai picked up a loose ball and made a "smart run" and passed to Jackson who sent it to Cross who "eluded a couple of opponents and dashed over near the posts". The score was 3-3 at the break, and straight after the Waikato side attacked and "after a tough battle" Hall "struggled over near the posts" but he failed with his own conversion. The Auckland forwards responded with a "spirited" attack but the backs didn't back them up and there was no scoring for ten minutes. Then Don Kenealy started a rush which carried on and saw Dunning score close to the posts and C. Clark's kick went over to give Auckland an 8-6 lead. However Lower Waikto went on to attack with "vigour" and from a loose rush F. Littlewood scored a try with Henderson converting to extend their lead to 11-8. The pace now quickened and a "centring kick by Harry Childs gave Kenealy a chance, and the sturdy little wing-threethreequarter was over the visitors line in a twinkling". Clark converted once more and now Auckland lead 13-11. Just two minutes later the Waikato forwards swept through Auckland and J. Dunn fell on the ball near the corner and Henderson converted "with a great kick". Jim Rukutai led a charge for Auckland into opposition territory but Reg Sprague and Neild kept stopping them. Auckland was playing with desperation but the Waikato team was the better on the day and "it was no surprise ... when a further try was scored. Dunn was again the scorer, and as on a former occasion, the try was the outcome of good following up". Henderson converted the try and then shortly afterwards the game concluded.

| 3 August | Auckland B | 13–21 (3-3) | Lower Waikato | Eden Park |
| 3:00 | Try: A. Cross, Charles Dunning, Don Kenealy; Con: C. Clark 2/2, Charles Dunning 0/1 | | Try: Neild, F. Hall, F. Littlewood, J. Dunn 2 Con: H. Henderson 3/4, F. Hall 0/1; Pen: F. Hall 0/2 | Referee: T. Cunningham |

Team details

| FB | 1 | Harry Childs |
| WG | 2 | Bob Biggs |
| CE | 3 | Ernie Asher |
| CE | 4 | George Smith |
| WG | 5 | Don Kenealy |
| FE | 6 | Billy Curran |
| HB | 7 | Alfred Jackson |
| PR | 8 | Charles Dunning |
| HK | 9 | Charters |
| PR | 10 | C. Clark |
| SR | 11 | Jim Rukutai |
| SR | 12 | A. Cross |
| LF | 13 | Charles Brockliss |

| FB | 1 | A. Raynor |
| WG | 2 | F. Littlewood |
| CE | 3 | Bookham |
| CE | 4 | Reg Sprague |
| WG | 5 | Peckham |
| FE | 6 | Neild |
| HB | 7 | Gleeson |
| PR | 8 | A. McKinnon |
| HK | 9 | H. Henderson |
| PR | 10 | Tremain Haddon |
| SR | 11 | J. Dunn |
| SR | 12 | F. Hall |
| LF | 13 | McCauley |

=== Auckland v Wellington (Northern Union C.C.) ===
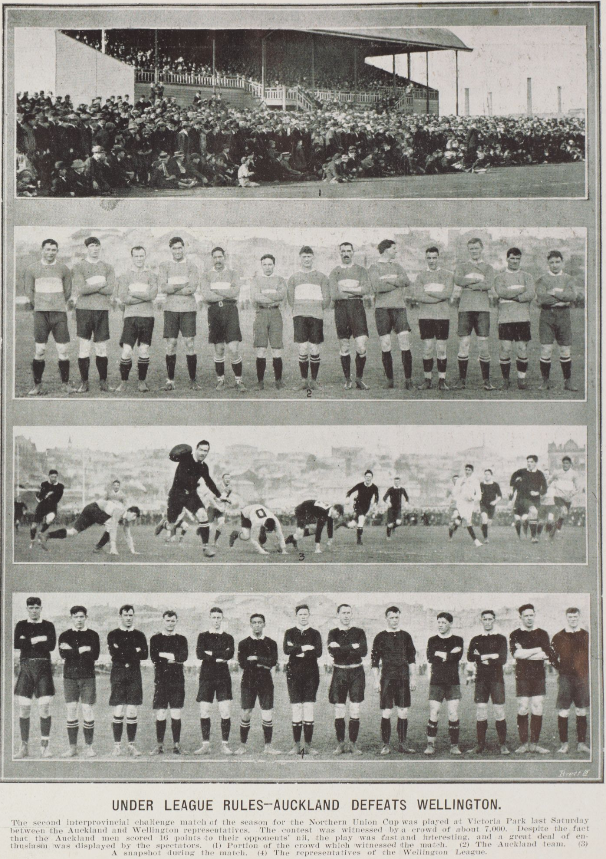

Due to the Rotorua and Thames leagues being affiliated with the Auckland Rugby League the Auckland team contained two players from each sub league. Namely Riki Papakura and Rukingi Reke from Rotorua and Harold Hayward and his brother Morgan Hayward from Thames. The Victoria Park ground was said to be in "splendid order and a stiff south-west breeze blew across the ground". Robert Irvine kicked off for Wellington against the wind and Jim Rukutai took the ball and passed to George Gillett but the play that followed was loose. Auckland secured the ball from a couple of scrums, the first of which saw Stan Weston kick well up field and the second saw Billy Curran make a fine run but his pass was intercepted by Bill Kelly who passed to George Cook and the winger took off up field into Auckland territory but it didn't amount to anything. A while later Arthur Hardgrave at fullback for Auckland "made an opening by smartly side-stepping one of the visiting forwards" and he was helped by Weston in taking play into a dangerous position where a Wellington player gave away a penalty and Hardgrave kicked a good penalty. After the restart Billy Wilson and Bert King "got busy" with both teams striving to get good field position. Then George Baskiville made a break for Wellington and passed to Kelly who was well tackled. Both teams had turns on attack with play moving up and down the field several times. Some time later Cecil King gave away a scrum penalty for "lifting" and Hardgrave just missed the goal kick from a long range. Play continued to move about the field through a combination of runs and kicks for both sides before Charles Webb dashed in to the Wellington 25 and passed to Curran but he was tackled by Baskiville. From a resulting scrum the ball was passed over the Wellington line and both teams rushed for the ball with Curran getting there first and scoring a try with Hardgrave converting. Wellington attacked but then Harold Hayward and Rukingi Reke took play back the other way then Cook intercepted and sprinted down the side line but was "floored by [Riki] Papakura". He was "laid out for a few seconds, as C. Murphy and Weston had been a short while before". When play resumed the Wellington side attacked well through their backs, Wilson, Baskerville, Kelly, and Bradley on multiple occasions but it was Auckland who scored when Gillett passed to Harold Hayward who sent it to Bob Mitchell and he sent it back to Hayward but the pass went forward and Wellington got a penalty kick and sent it out as the bell went for half time with Auckland leading 7-0. Straight after half time Wellington went "hotly to the attack" and James Barber made a great run and "looked like scoring, when he was overpowered". Both teams took turns attacking but couldn't create any really good chances. Wellington went close to Auckland's line but Curran saved with a "timely run" and from a kick Jim Gilmour marked near halfway and sent a place kick for goal close but it fell just short of the cross bar and was touched down by Auckland. The game was now being played at a "cracking" pace and William Tobin intercepted from a passing rush and returned the play for Auckland. Loose play followed and Wilson was "winded" for Wellington. Then Webb made a break for Auckland and passed to Reke who sprinted ahead and passed several opponents until he neared the goal line and then Weston cut in and scored. Hardgrave made a good effort but it went wide and Auckland now led 10-0. Wellington attacked through Wilson but then Auckland moved play back downfield through H. Hayward, Gillett, and Dunning but the ball was knocked on. From the scrum the ball ended up in the in goal and Reke following up scored though Hardgrave missed the conversion. Once more from a kickoff Wellington got on the attack and Bradley got to the line but was called back for a knock on. Cook intercepted for Wellington but then Auckland resumed their attack and Jim Rukutai got a clear run in and scored close to the posts but Hardgrave missed once more. Play flew about the field over the remaining time and at one stage Hardgrave took a long drop goal attempt but just missed. Auckland was hot on attack with Papakura being tackled well by Bradley just as the bell sounded for full time with Auckland ahead 16-0. The Wellington team was entertained in the evening at the Waitemata Hotel before moving on to New Plymouth on Tuesday to play Taranaki on Thursday.

| 10 August | Auckland | 16–0 (7-0) | Wellington | Victoria Park |
| 3:00 | Try: Billy Curran, Stan Weston, Rukingi Reke, Jim Rukutai; Con: Arthur Hardgrave 1/4; Pen: Arthur Hardgrave 1/2; Drop: Arthur Hardgrave 0/1 | | Pen: Jim Gilmour 0/1 (mark) | Attendance: 5,500; Referee: Archie Ferguson |

Team details

| FB | 1 | Arthur Hardgrave |
| WG | 2 | Stan Weston |
| CE | 3 | William Tobin |
| CE | 4 | Billy Curran |
| WG | 5 | Riki Papakura (Rotorua) |
| FE | 6 | Rukingi Reke (Rotorua) |
| HB | 7 | Charles Webb |
| PR | 8 | Harold Hayward (Thames) |
| HK | 9 | Morgan Hayward (Thames) |
| PR | 10 | Charles Dunning |
| SR | 11 | Bob Mitchell |
| SR | 12 | Jim Rukutai |
| LF | 13 | George Gillett |

| FB | 1 | C. Murphy |
| WG | 2 | Jim Gilmour |
| CE | 3 | George Bradley |
| CE | 4 | George Baskiville |
| WG | 5 | George Cook |
| FE | 6 | Bill Kelly |
| HB | 7 | James Barber |
| PR | 8 | Bert King |
| HK | 9 | Robert Irvine |
| PR | 10 | Cecil King |
| SR | 11 | C. Chapman |
| SR | 12 | J. Ashton |
| LF | 13 | Billy Wilson |

=== Auckland v Waikato ===
The Waikato team was selected "for the most part from teams at Hamilton". Auckland won the match easily with the New Zealand Herald writing "the visitors were outclassed in every department of the game, and Auckland was never extended". Auckland kicked off, defending the western goal line and went immediately on to the attack. Alan Blakey starting a "fine attacking movement" supported by Dick Roope, but it was ruined by a dropped pass. Jim Rukutai then crossed the line with the ball at his toe but was called back for an obstruction infringement. Waikato had a turn on attack and got into Auckland's 25 but William Tobin secured the ball for Auckland and ran to mid-field where he lost possession but Morgan Hayward picked the ball up and passed to Bob Mitchell who scored near the posts and Arthur Hardgrave converted. Shortly after following some "good work" by Alfred Jackson Blakey scored for Auckland and George Seagar converted. Jackson then scored a good try of his own near the corner but Hardgrave missed with the conversion. Harrison (Waikato) was ordered off the field for "unsteady play" and McKinder replaced him. A few minutes later a passing rush between Jackson, Seagar, Jim Griffen, and Rukutai resulted in Rukutai crossing to score with Griffen adding the extra points. Halftime came with Auckland 18-0 in front. From the restart Auckland attacked through their backs and Blakey "beat the Waikato fullback [Taylor] badly, and scored between the posts" and Seagar converted. Hardgrave scored next after gaining the ball near halfway and crossing near the corner. He took the kick himself and landed a "fine goal". Waikato began to play "with more detemination, and made several unsuccessful attempts to cross Auckland's line". Then Auckland cleared and a passing movement between Rukutai, Tobin, Ike Healy, and Griffen saw Stan Weston score an easy try and Rukutai converted. The defence of Waikato was now "woefully weak" and another rush involving Rukutai, Hayward, Griffen, and Seagar saw the last named score and Rukutai converting from near the posts. Auckland's final try came from Mitchell and they didn't bother with the conversion attempt.

| 17 August | Auckland | 41–0 (18-0) | Waikato | Eden Park |
| 3:00 | Try: Bob Mitchell 2, Arthur Hardgrave, Alan Blakey 2, Albert Jackson, Jim Rukutai, George Seagar, Stan Weston; Con: Arthur Hardgrave 2/3, Jim Rukutai 2/2, George Seagar 2/2, Jim Griffin 1/1; Pen: Arthur Hardgrave 0/1, Unknown 0/1 | | | Referee: E. R. Harker, TJ's: Dick Benson and Matt Hooper |

Team details

| FB | 1 | Arthur Hardgrave |
| WG | 2 | Stan Weston |
| CE | 3 | William Tobin |
| CE | 4 | Dick Roope |
| WG | 5 | Billy Curran |
| FE | 6 | Alan Blakey |
| HB | 7 | Alfred Jackson |
| PR | 8 | Jim Rukutai |
| HK | 9 | Alex Stanaway |
| PR | 10 | Jim Griffen |
| SR | 11 | Bob Mitchell |
| SR | 12 | George Seagar |
| LF | 13 | Morgan Hayward |
Emergency: D. (Ike) Healy came on

| FB | 1 | Taylor |
| WG | 2 | Hogg |
| CE | 3 | T. Hughes |
| CE | 4 | Dawes |
| WG | 5 | Johnston |
| FE | 6 | Field |
| HB | 7 | Frank Morse |
| PR | 8 | Harwood |
| HK | 9 | Wells |
| PR | 10 | Agnew |
| SR | 11 | Gill |
| SR | 12 | C. Stapleton |
| LF | 13 | Harrison (sent off) |
Emergency: McKinder (came on for Harrison)

=== Auckland v New Zealand Māori ===
There was a good attendance for the only rugby league match played in the weekend in Auckland. Right from the start Auckland dominated and apart from "occasional flashes" the Māori side was on the defensive throughout. The Māori side took the field "clad in riding trousers". Auckland kicked off and the ball was marked by a Māori player. Young (Auckland) got the ball from the resulting kick and went straight down field but was "upset before he could clear, and the Māori forwards took charge". Eventually Billy Curran got the ball and "ended a clever run by going over at the posts" but the conversion missed. The Māori sides defense was said to be very disorganised and Curran sent the ball to Alan Blakey who gave Young the ball ten yards from the line and the Ponsonby three-quarter went straight and "buried himself across the line, grounding the ball clearly with three opponents on top", though Stan Weston missed the kick. After the restart the Māori forwards headed the play with Jim Rukutai taking the ball upfield against the side he was usually playing for. He then picked up the ball from loose play and scored to loud applause though the conversion attempt missed. The Māori side made a lot of individual efforts but they didn't result in much and any efforts the Auckland team made were "in vain". Eventually the Auckland forwards came away "with a big rush" and then George Seagar got possession and scored in a handy position and converted his own try. Bob Mitchell crossed for Auckland soon after and Charles Webb kicked a good goal. Soon after Rukutai set off up-field and got close before being tackled but the forwards took the leather on and Bush ran over under the posts but Rukutai's conversion hit the post and missed. After this Auckland scored four tries through Mitchell (with Webb converting), Young, Curran, Dick Roope, and Harry Fricker, with Curran's try being the only one converted.

| 24 August | Auckland | 30–6 | New Zealand Māori | Eden Park |
| 3:00 | Try: Billy Curran 2, Young 2, George Seagar, Bob Mitchell, Dick Roope, Harry Fricker; Con: Stan Weston 0/1, George Seagar 1/1, Charles Webb 1/1, Unknown 1/5 | | Try: Jim Rukutai, Bush; Con: Jim Rukutai 0/2 | Referee: Knox |

Team details

| FB | 1 | Arthur Hardgrave |
| WG | 2 | Stan Weston |
| CE | 3 | Billy Curran |
| CE | 4 | Young |
| WG | 5 | Dick Roope |
| FE | 6 | Alan Blakey |
| HB | 7 | Charles Webb |
| PR | 8 | Charles Dunning |
| HK | 9 | Bob Mitchell |
| PR | 10 | George Seagar |
| SR | 11 | Harold Hayward |
| SR | 12 | Morgan Hayward |
| LF | 13 | Harry Fricker |

| FB | 1 | Briggs |
| WG | 2 | Hira |
| CE | 3 | Bush |
| CE | 4 | Maki |
| WG | 5 | Bennett |
| FE | 6 | Matene |
| HB | 7 | Rau |
| PR | 8 | Jim Rukutai |
| HK | 9 | Ariki Haira (Alex Stanaway) |
| PR | 10 | Te Keepa Pouwhiuwhiu (Ernie Asher) |
| SR | 11 | Clark |
| SR | 12 | Wynyard |
| LF | 13 | Riki Papakura |
Emergency: King
Emergency: Wirihana
Emergency: Flavell
Emergency: Paul

=== Auckland v New South Wales (31 August) ===
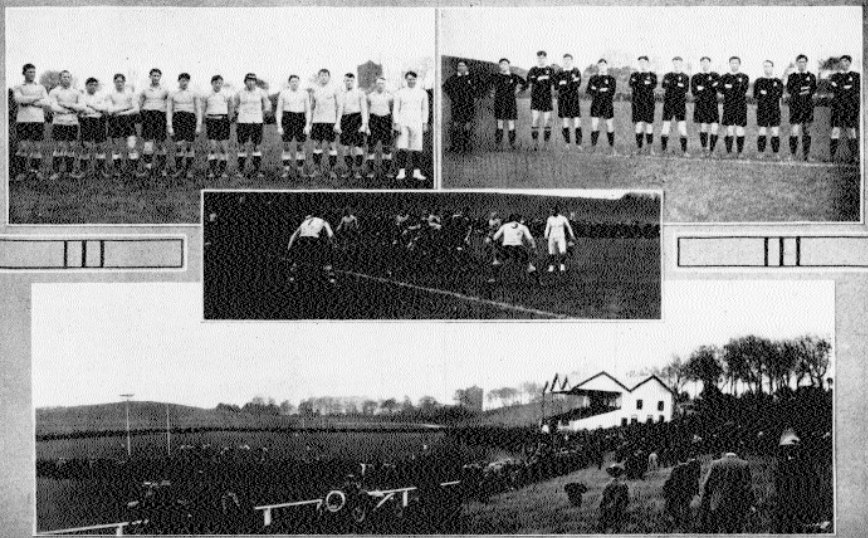
Auckland and NSW teams.

Auckland won their first victory over an ‘international’ side when they defeated New South Wales by 10 points to 3. The game was marred by several acts of violence with the visiting side said to be at fault repeatedly. Near the end of the match Sid Deane was sent off for punching Billy Curran.

| 31 August | Auckland | 10–3 | New South Wales | Victoria Park |
| 3:00 | Try: Bob Mitchell, Rukingi Reke; Con: Arthur Hardgrave; Pen: Charles Dunning | | Try: Bob Williams | Attendance: 10,000; Referee: Angus Campbell |

=== Auckland v New South Wales (21 September) ===
New South Wales reversed their earlier loss with a comprehensive win over a disappointing Auckland effort. Charles Dunning and Bob Mitchell who had both been named to play originally were forced to withdraw due to illness and were replaced by Harry Fricker and Jim Griffin.

| 21 September | Auckland | 2–25 | New South Wales | Auckland Domain |
| 3:00 | Pen: Arthur Hardgrave | | Try: Frank Burge, Arthur Halloway, Dan Frawley 4, Ray Norman; Con: Dan Frawley, Ray Norman | Attendance: 9000; Referee: Archie Ferguson |

=== Auckland representative matches played and scorers ===
| Rank | Name | Club | Played | Tries | Con | Pen | Points |
|---|---|---|---|---|---|---|---|
| 1 | Arthur Hardgrave | Manukau | 7 | 1 | 7 | 4 | 25 |
| 2 | Bob Mitchell | City | 8 | 7 | - | - | 21 |
| 3 | George Seagar | North Shore | 7 | 3 | 4 | - | 17 |
| 4 | Jim Rukutai | Manukau | 6 | 4 | 2 | - | 16 |
| 5 | Billy Curran | Newton | 6 | 3 | 1 | - | 11 |
| 6 | Charles Dunning | Ponsonby | 5 | 1 | - | 2 | 7 |
| 7 | Arthur Francis | Newton | 1 | - | 2 | 1 | 6 |
| 7 | Stan Weston | North Shore | 7 | 2 | - | - | 6 |
| 7 | Ike Healy | Newton | 4 | 2 | - | - | 6 |
| 7 | Harry Fricker | Ponsonby | 5 | 2 | - | - | 6 |
| 7 | Alan Blakey | Newton | 7 | 2 | - | - | 6 |
| 7 | Rukingi Reke | Rotorua | 4 | 2 | - | - | 6 |
| 7 | Young | Ponsonby | 1 | 2 | - | - | 6 |
| 14 | Charles Webb | Ponsonby | 7 | 1 | 1 | - | 5 |
| 15 | C Clark | North Shore | 1 | - | 2 | - | 4 |
| 16 | Malcolm | Newton | 1 | 1 | - | - | 3 |
| 16 | Arthur Carlaw | Ponsonby | 2 | 1 | - | - | 3 |
| 16 | Don Kenealy | Eden | 4 | 1 | - | - | 3 |
| 16 | Alfred Jackson | North Shore | 3 | 1 | - | - | 3 |
| 16 | Harold Hayward | Thames | 5 | 1 | - | - | 3 |
| 16 | Adelbert Tobin | Newton | 3 | 1 | - | - | 3 |
| 16 | Cross | Newton | 1 | 1 | - | - | 3 |
| 16 | Dick Roope | Ponsonby | 5 | 1 | - | - | 3 |
| 24 | Alex Stanaway | City | 2 | - | - | 1 | 2 |
| 24 | Jim Griffin | North Shore | 4 | - | 1 | - | 2 |
| 26 | Morgan Hayward | Thames | 6 | - | - | - | 0 |
| 26 | Harry Childs | City | 3 | - | - | - | 0 |
| 26 | Ernie Asher | City | 2 | - | - | - | 0 |
| 26 | George Smith | Newton | 2 | - | - | - | 0 |
| 26 | Frazer | ? | 1 | - | - | - | 0 |
| 26 | George Harrison | North Shore | 1 | - | - | - | 0 |
| 26 | G Warner | City | 1 | - | - | - | 0 |
| 26 | McPherson | Ponsonby | 1 | - | - | - | 0 |
| 26 | Tom Avery | City | 1 | - | - | - | 0 |
| 26 | William Capill | Thames | 1 | - | - | - | 0 |
| 26 | G Lambert | Ponsonby | 2 | - | - | - | 0 |
| 26 | Charters | Ponsonby | 1 | - | - | - | 0 |
| 26 | Riki Papakura | Rotorua | 1 | - | - | - | 0 |
| 26 | George Gillett | Newton | 1 | - | - | - | 0 |
