= Dervan =

Dervan is a surname. Notable people with the surname include:

- Dervan (duke) (fl. 615–636), Sorbian medieval ruler
- Billy Dervan (1884–1944), New Zealand rugby league player
- Mick Dervan (1898–1981), Irish hurler
- Peter Dervan (born 1945), American chemist
- Sarah Dervan (born 1988), Irish camogie player
- Siobhan Dervan (born 1978), Irish racing cyclist
