= 1912 New Zealand rugby league tour of Australia =

The 1912 New Zealand rugby league tour of Australia was a tour by the New Zealand national rugby league team.

== Squad ==
The touring party included, backs; Arthur Carlaw (vice-captain), James Barber, George Bradley, Billy Curran, Jim Gilmour, Arthur Hardgrave, Bill Kelly, Don Kenealy, Lance Moir, Charles Webb, Stan Weston and forwards; Arthur Francis (captain), Tom Brownlee, Billy Dervan, Charles Dunning, Dave Evans, Harold Hayward, Morgan Hayward, Robert Irvine, Cecil King and Jim Rukutai.

They were managed by Barry Brigham and Tom MacReynolds.

Captain Arthur Francis left the squad before the final game against New South Wales. Francis took up a contract with Wigan, leaving on the same boat for England as Herb Gilbert, Steve Darmody and Bill Farnsworth.

== Fixtures ==
Before the tour New Zealand defeated Auckland 38–16.

New Zealand arrived in Sydney after midnight and only 14 hours before kick off of their first match.

Date	Opponent	Venue	Result	Score	Attendance	Report
	New South Wales	Agricultural Ground, Sydney	Loss	8-27		
	New South Wales	Sydney	Win	12-7		
	Queensland	Brisbane Cricket Ground, Brisbane	Win	15-8		
	Queensland	Brisbane Cricket Ground, Brisbane	Win	16-10		
	Combined XIII	Brisbane Cricket Ground, Brisbane	Loss	10-13		
	Newcastle	Newcastle	Win	4-20		
	New South Wales	Sydney	Loss	3-14		

The Combined XIII included five players from New South Wales, including Dally Messenger. However, because the team was organised by the Queensland Rugby League, it is not considered an official Australian match.

The players were scheduled to sail immediately after their final game as the New Zealand Rugby League had organised a match in Wellington. However the players rebelled and demanded a break from their hectic schedule. The NZRL subsequently held an inquest and fined the players 10 shillings each.
