= Arthur Hardgrave =

NZ international rugby league footballer

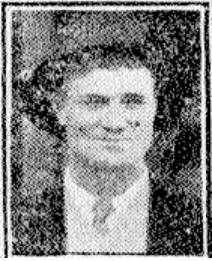

Personal information
- Born: 18 August 1882 New Zealand
- Died: 31 December 1953 (aged 71) New Zealand

Playing information
- Position: Fullback
Club
Years	Team	Pld	T	G	FG	P
1912–13	Manukau Rovers	9	3	3	0	15
1914–16	Otahuhu Rovers	15	2	6	0	18
1917–20	Ponsonby United	10	0	0	0	0
	Total	34	5	9	0	33
Representative
Years	Team	Pld	T	G	FG	P
1908–11	Taranaki	5	1	8	0	19
1912–14	Auckland	11	1	11	0	25
1912–14	New Zealand	8 (1)	0	4	0	8
- Relatives: Roy Hardgrave (son)

Arthur Hardgrave (1882–1953) was a New Zealand rugby league player who represented New Zealand. His son Roy Hardgrave also played for New Zealand as well as a very long club career where he was one of New Zealand's most prolific ever try scorers with Newton Rangers, St Helens, York, Toulouse, and Mount Albert.

== Playing career ==
=== Rugby union ===
In an article in the Auckland Star of 1929 at a farewell dinner for his son Roy Hardgrave who was going to England after signing with the St Helens club, Hardgrave was asked to comment on his career. He humbly declined to comment but others did, and as a result the Star published the following comments: "Shaver" Hardgrave played his first football in New Plymouth, and when really quite a diminutive youngster at the age of 16 he took the field in representative football. Throughout his football career, he played fullback, and it was in 1899 that he represented Taranaki against Wanganui and other provincial sides, making a name for himself as one of the finest custodians in the game. When nearing the height of his career he left for the South African War, but on returning to the Dominion he again found his way to the Taranaki town, where he continued playing for his old club, the Star. Years rolled on and 'Shaver" rapidly climbed the ladder of football fame. He was an idol among the fans. The writer has heard him referred to by players of that time as a "wonder". He was the greatest kick of the day, and could punt with uncanny accuracy with either right or left foot, while he was a deadly tackler and as cool as a cucumber. In 1908 he played against Harding's English team, and it was when the first Auckland team went on tour of New Zealand and visited New Plymouth that he changed over to the league code".

=== Rugby league ===
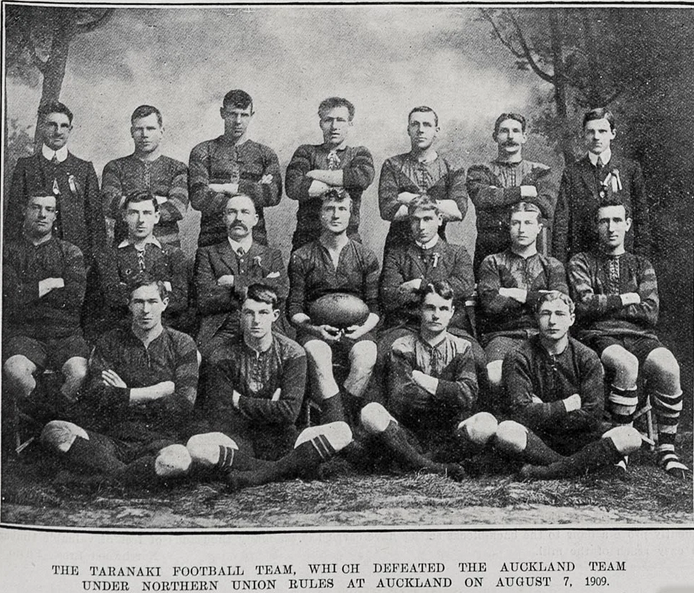
Hardgrave in the Taranaki side to play Auckland in 1911.

Hardgrave played for Taranaki against Auckland in 1908, 1909 and again in 1911 when he kicked three goals. Rugby league in Taranaki developed well in 1908 and 1909 but there was a shortage of grounds and the game essentially disappeared. As a result Hardgrave moved to Auckland and joined the Manukau club.

On his debut for Manukau he scored a try and kicked a goal in a 19 to 5 loss to a strong Ponsonby side. Scoring records were very patchy for the Manukau team with the newspapers often failing to send out reporters to matches in Onehunga and therefore it is unknown how many points Hardgrave scored for Manukau beyond the 2 tries, 1 conversion and 2 penalties he was credited with during the 1912 season. In 1912, Hardgrave whilst at Manukau was selected for the New Zealand national side who toured Australia. No test matches were played on the tour but Hardgrave became the 74th player to represent New Zealand. Following the tour, Hardgrave was part of the Auckland side that defeated New South Wales 10–3 in a return match at Victoria Park.

The Manukau senior team collapsed during the 1913 season and he was granted a transfer to North Shore however it was near the season end and he did not take the field in either of their two remaining games. In the 1914 season Hardgrave joined the newly formed Otahuhu Rovers senior team which was much closer to where he lived. He was then selected for the New Zealand team to play the touring Great Britain Lions. The test match was lost 16–13 and Hardgrave never reappeared for New Zealand afterwards. He also played against the Lions for Auckland. Hardgrave continued to play for Otahuhu in 1915, 1916 and was linked with the club at the start of the 1917 season but he did not make any appearances for them and they folded after a 3 defeats on the field and a further default loss. He then joined the Ponsonby United club and debuted for them on July 28, 1917 in a 5-0 loss to City in the final round of the championship. He had come on to replace Spence Jones who had retired injured during the first half. He played 3 matches to start the 1918 season and was listed in their team to play 2 games mid season in 1920.
