= Lyn Weston =

- Born: Lynley Herbert Weston; 1 September 1892 Auckland, New Zealand
- Died: 2 November 1963 (aged 71) Whangārei, New Zealand
- Height: 1.73 m (5 ft 8 in)
- Weight: 76 kg (168 lb)

Rugby union career
- Position: First five-eighth
Provincial / State sides
Years	Team	Apps	(Points)
1912–14	Auckland		
1921–22	North Auckland		
International career
Years	Team	Apps	(Points)
1914	New Zealand	0	(0)

Lynley Herbert Weston (1 September 1892 – 2 November 1963) was a New Zealand rugby union player.

== Early life ==
Weston was born in Auckland in 1892 to Stephen James Weston. He had two brothers and three sisters. His elder brother, Stan Weston, also played rugby union.

== Playing career ==
A five five-eighth, Weston represented Auckland and North Auckland at a provincial level, and was a member of the New Zealand national team, the All Blacks, on their 1914 tour of Australia. However, hampered by injury, he only played in one match on that tour, against Queensland.

== Later life ==
During World War I, Weston served with the New Zealand Field Engineers in Egypt between 1915 and 1916, rising to the rank of corporal. He was invalided back to New Zealand in 1916 and discharged as medically unfit for service.

Lyn and Stan Weston were both garage proprietors in Whangārei in the 1930s. Lyn's son David played representative rugby and cricket for Auckland and was an All Black reserve in 1950. Weston died in Whangārei on 2 November 1963, and he was buried in Maunu Cemetery.
