= David Weston (cricketer) =

New Zealand cricketer

Personal information
- Full name: David Lynley Weston
- Born: 30 July 1930; Whangārei, New Zealand
- Died: 25 January 1977 (aged 46); Rotorua, New Zealand
- Batting: Right-handed
- Role: Batsman
- Relatives: Lyn Weston (father)

Domestic team information
- Years: Team
- 1950/51: Auckland
- Source: Cricinfo, 26 June 2016

David Lynley Weston (30 July 1930 – 25 January 1977) was a New Zealand sportsman. He played one first-class cricket match for Auckland during the 1950–51 season. and played representative rugby union for the Auckland Rugby Football Union.

Weston was born at Whangārei in 1930, the son of former All Black and Auckland rugby footballer Lyn Weston. He was educated at Mount Albert Grammar School before going up to studt engineering at Auckland University. He played both rugby and cricket at school and university, playing representative schools rugby for Auckland and coming into the Auckland age-group cricket side for Brabin Cup matches in 1948–49. Later in 1949 he made his full representative rugby debut for Auckland, playing as first five-eighth for the team, the same position his father had played. He playing for the provincial side against the touring British Lions in 1950 was a reserve for the fourth Test match later in the season, although he did not win an All Black cap.

As a cricketer, Weston played as a batsman. He impressed English professional Joe Hardstaff who coached Auckland during the 1948–49 season, and was considered as the most promising of Auckland's young batsmen. He played for the Auckland B team during the 1949–50 season before making his only first-class appearance for the representative cricket side the following year, scoring nine runs against Wellington in December 1950. He was twelfth man for the side's following match against Otago.

Weston worked as an engineer in Rotorua and played cricket for Bay of Plenty during the 1950s. He died at Rotorua in 1977 aged 46.
