= Morgan Hayward =

NZ international rugby league footballer

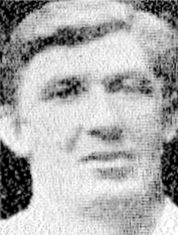

Personal information
- Full name: Lewis Morgan Hayward
- Born: 28 August 1890 Marlborough Region, New Zealand
- Died: 21 October 1971 (aged 81)

Playing information
- Position: Forward
Representative
Years	Team	Pld	T	G	FG	P
≤1912–≥12	Thames
1912–13	Auckland	11	0	0	0	0
1912–1913	New Zealand	7	1	0	0	3
1913	Country Combined	1	0	0	0	0
- Relatives: Harold Hayward (brother)

Lewis Morgan Hayward (28 August 1890 – 21 October 1971) was a New Zealand fish curer, and professional rugby league footballer who played in the 1910s. He played at representative level for New Zealand, and Thames, as a forward.

Hayward was the brother of fellow New Zealand international, Harold Hayward.

== International honours ==
Hayward represented New Zealand in 1912 against New South Wales on New Zealand's tour of Australia. He played for Thames while it was a sub-league of the Auckland Rugby League.
