= Jim Gilmour =

New Zealand international rugby league footballer

Personal information
- Full name: James Montgomery Gilmour
- Born: 4 January 1881; Boveedy, County Londonderry, Ireland
- Died: 18 December 1918 (aged 37); Tidworth, Wiltshire, England

Playing information
- Weight: 11 st 12 lb (75 kg)
- Position: Centre
Club
Years	Team	Pld	T	G	FG	P
1911	North Sydney	1	0	0	0	0
Representative
Years	Team	Pld	T	G	FG	P
1912	Wellington	4	1	0	0	3
1911–12	New Zealand	6	9	4	0	35

James Montgomery Gilmour (4 January 1881 – 18 December 1918) was an Irish-born New Zealand rugby league footballer who played in the 1910s. He played at representative level for New Zealand (non-Test matches), and Wellington, as a centre.

== Playing career ==
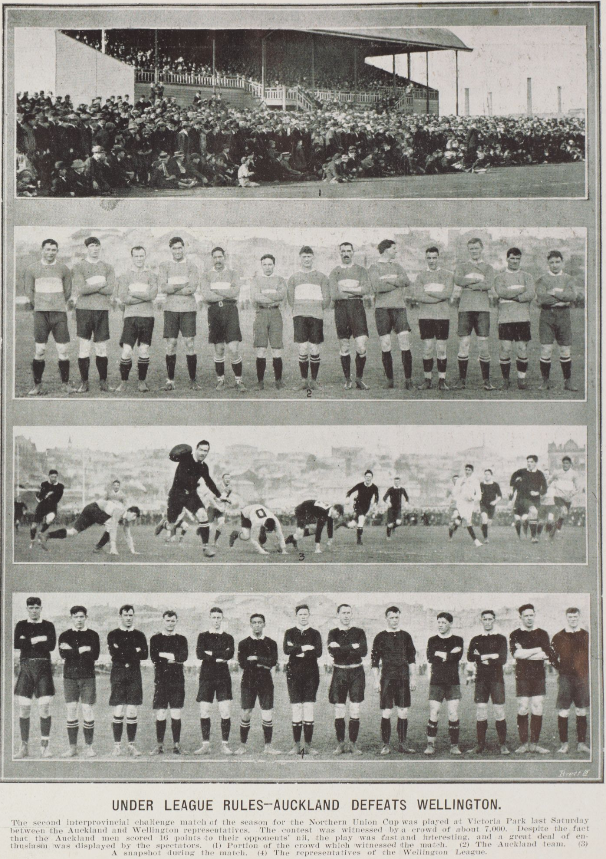
Gilmour in the Wellington side to play Auckland at Victoria Park in 1912.

Gilmour moved to Australia in 1911, playing for North Sydney alongside compatriot Billy Mitchell until heading north to play for Queensland. Gilmour played all three matches against the touring New Zealand side before joining the New Zealanders for matches against Hunter River and New South Wales.

He again toured Australia with New Zealand in 1912. Prior to leaving he scored 5 tries for New Zealand against Auckland along with a conversion.

== Military service and death ==
Gilmour served as a private with the New Zealand Expeditionary Force in World War I. He sailed from New Zealand with the 43rd reinforcements on 17 August 1918 and died of pneumonia at Tidworth Hospital, Wiltshire, England on 18 December 1918. He was buried at Tidworth Military Cemetery.
