= Rukingi Reke =

New Zealand international rugby league & union player

Personal information
- Full name: Joseph Reke Rukingi Rogers
- Born: 23 January 1892; Auckland, New Zealand
- Died: 3 November 1974 (aged 82); Auckland, New Zealand

Playing information
- Height: 5 ft 5 in (1.65 m)
- Weight: 141 lb (64 kg)

Rugby league
- Position: Utility Back
Representative
Years	Team	Pld	T	G	FG	P
1910–22	New Zealand Māori	2	0	0	0	0
1910–14	Rotorua	9	8	2	0	28
1911	Rotorua Country	1	0	2	0	4
1912–14	Auckland	6	3	0	0	9
1912–13	New Zealand	6	0	0	0	0

Rugby union
Representative
Years	Team	Pld	T	G	FG	P
1919	Māori Pioneers	1	1	0	0	3
1919–20	Rotorua	3	1	0	0	3
1919–20	Bay of Plenty	8	0	0	0	0

Joseph Rukingi Reke (23 January 1892 – 3 November 1974) was a New Zealand rugby union and professional rugby league footballer who played representative rugby league (RL) for New Zealand.

== Early life ==
Rukingi was born on 23 January 1892 to Wiri Rogers and Meretina Hamuera Pango.

== Rugby union career ==
Reke played rugby union for New Zealand Māori under the name Joseph Rogers.

== Playing career ==
Reke played for Rotorua and represented New Zealand in 1912 and on the 1913 tour of Australia. No tests were played in those years however, with matches instead against New South Wales and Queensland.

== Personal life and death ==
Rukingi married Lenare Elizabeth Gordon on 7 October 1920. They had 3 sons, Gordon, Desmond and Robert (Bob). Rukingi died on 3 November 1974, aged 82.
