= Cecil King (rugby league) =

New Zealand international rugby league footballer

Personal information
- Full name: Cecil Bryan King
- Born: 21 June 1888; Napier, New Zealand
- Died: 13 July 1975 (aged 87); Hāwera, New Zealand

Playing information
- Position: Forward
Club
Years	Team	Pld	T	G	FG	P
1913	Newton Rangers	9	2	1	0	8
Representative
Years	Team	Pld	T	G	FG	P
≤1912–≥12	Wellington
1913	Auckland	1	0	0	0	0
≤1913–≥13	Taranaki
1912–13	New Zealand	0	0	0	0	0

Cecil Bryan King (21 June 1888 – 13 July 1975) was a New Zealand professional rugby league footballer who played in the 1910s. He played at representative level for New Zealand, Wellington and Taranaki, as a forward. In 1913 he moved to Auckland and played for Newton Rangers where he scored 2 tries and kicked a conversion during the season. He played 1 match for Auckland.

== Playing career ==
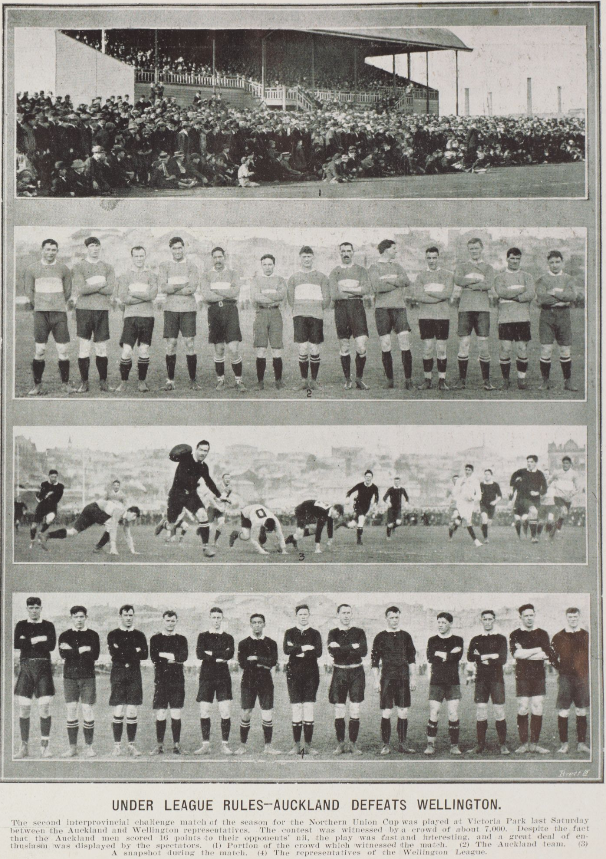
King in the Wellington side to play Auckland at Victoria Park in August, 1912.

King represented New Zealand in 1912 on their tour of Australia and toured Australia again in 1913.
