= Arthur Francis (rugby) =

NZ dual-code rugby international footballer

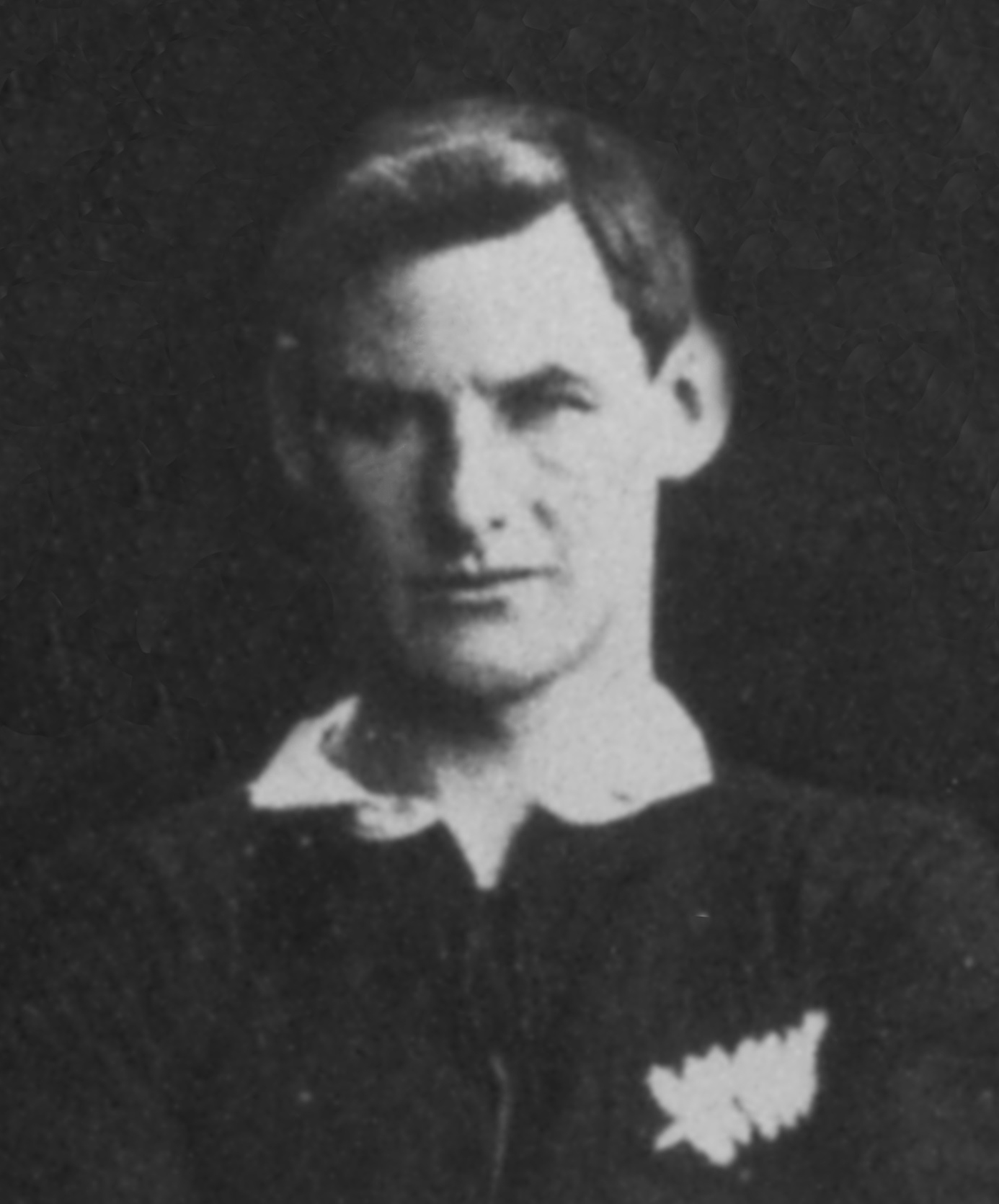
- Francis in 1905

Personal information
- Full name: Arthur Reginald Howe Francis
- Born: 8 June 1882 Whanganui, New Zealand
- Died: 15 June 1957 (aged 75) Takapuna, New Zealand

Playing information
- Height: 190 cm (6 ft 3 in)
- Weight: 14 st 0 lb (89 kg)

Rugby union
- Position: Lock
Club
Years	Team	Pld	T	G	FG	P
1901–10	Ponsonby RFC	87	18	48	0	176
Representative
Years	Team	Pld	T	G	FG	P
1904–10	Auckland	33	5	6	0	33
1905–10	New Zealand	10	3	2	1	16

Rugby league
- Position: Forward
Club
Years	Team	Pld	T	G	FG	P
1911–12	Newton Rangers (ARL)	5	6	5	0	28
1912–19	Wigan	130	41	40	0	211
	Total	135	47	45	0	239
Representative
Years	Team	Pld	T	G	FG	P
1911	Auckland	1	0	3	0	6
1911–12	New Zealand	3	0	5	1	12
1911–12	Australia	24	9	48	0	123

Coaching information

Rugby union
Club
Years	Team	Gms	W	D	L	W%
1929–35	Grammar RFC

Rugby league
Club
Years	Team	Gms	W	D	L	W%
1921–1923	Newton Rangers	39	12	2	25	31
Representative
Years	Team	Gms	W	D	L	W%
1922	Auckland	11	5	0	6	45

Arthur Reginald Howe Francis (8 June 1882 – 15 June 1957), also known by the nickname of "Bolla", was a New Zealand dual-code international rugby union and rugby league footballer who played in the 1900s, 1910s and 1920s, and rugby union coach of the 1930s. He played representative level rugby union (RU) for New Zealand, Auckland, and at club level for Ponsonby RFC. He also played representative level rugby league (RL) for New Zealand and Australasia, as well as at club level for Wigan, as a forward, and coached club level rugby union (RU) for Grammar RFC.

== Early years ==
Francis was born in Wanganui, New Zealand. He was educated at Auckland Grammar.

== Rugby union career ==
Francis played club rugby union for Ponsonby RFC, and was part of successive Auckland Rugby Union championships between 1908 and 1910. Francis made his Auckland début in 1904 and scored a penalty in the 1905 Ranfurly Shield victory over Wellington.

Francis made his All Blacks début in 1905 against Australia and became an automatic selection, playing in a total of ten Test matches in the next five years. In 1910 Francis and teammate George A. Gillett rescued Anglo-Welsh Lions player Percy Down, who had fallen into the sea, keeping him afloat until a rope was lowered from the ship upon which Down was about to return to Great Britain.

== Rugby league career ==
Francis switched codes in 1911 during the season, joining the Auckland Rugby League competition. He played for Newton Rangers and scored a try in his debut game in the code. He represented Auckland and New Zealand in his inaugural season, touring Australia, before being selected to be part of the Australasia side that toured Great Britain at the end of the year. In 1912 he captained New Zealand on his second tour of Australia. However, halfway through the tour, Francis left the touring party to take up a contract with Wigan. Arthur Francis played as a forward in Wigan's 21–5 victory over Rochdale Hornets in the 1912 Lancashire Cup Final during the 1912–13 season at Weaste, Salford, on Wednesday 11 December 1912. He would go on to play 214 first grade matches for Wigan.

== Coaching career ==
Francis was later reinstated by the New Zealand Rugby Union, and coached rugby union at club level for Grammar RFC in the Auckland Rugby Union competition.

== Personal life ==
Francis was the brother-in-law of The Original All Blacks captain, Dave Gallaher who married his sister, Ellen Ivy May Francis.
