= Robert Irvine (rugby league) =

New Zealand international rugby league footballer

Personal information
- Born: 1890 Wellington, New Zealand
- Died: Deceased

Playing information
- Position: Forward
Club
Years	Team	Pld	T	G	FG	P
1912	Poneke
Representative
Years	Team	Pld	T	G	FG	P
1912	New Zealand	4	0	0	0	0
1912	Wellington	1	0	0	2	4

Robert Irvine was a New Zealand professional rugby league footballer who played in the 1910s. He played at representative level for New Zealand, and Wellington, as a forward.

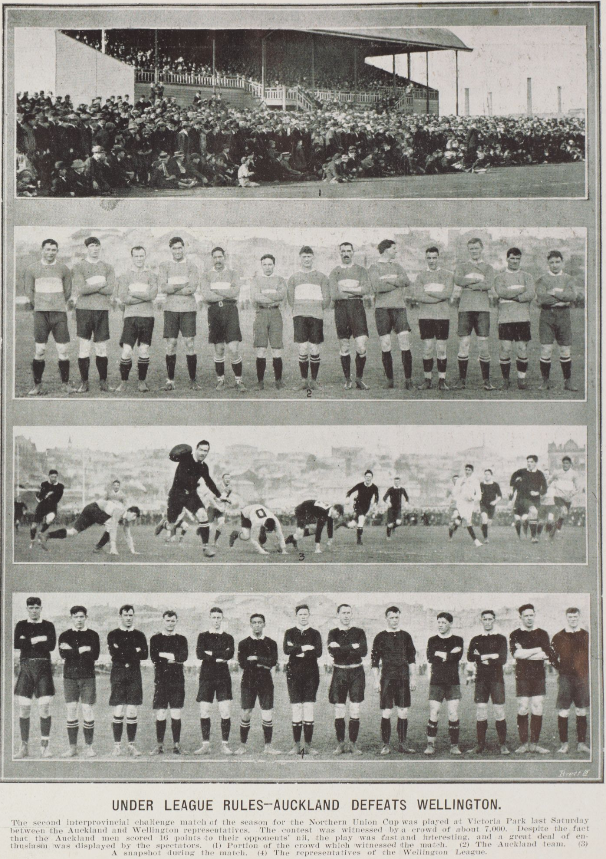
Irvine in the Wellington side to play Auckland at Victoria Park in 1912.

== Playing career ==
Irvine represented New Zealand in 1912 on their tour of Australia.
