= Henry Du Vall =

New Zealand rugby league footballer

Personal information
- Full name: Daniel Henry Verner Du Vall
- Born: 23 December 1886 Auckland, New Zealand
- Died: 12 October 1917 (aged 30) Passchendaele salient, Belgium

Playing information
- Height: 181.6 cm (5 ft 11.5 in)
- Weight: 81.6 kg (12 st 12 lb)

Rugby union
- Position: First five-eighth
Club
Years	Team	Pld	T	G	FG	P
1907	Grammar School Old Boys	5
1907	(A) Battery	3
1909	Kaikorai (Dunedin)	10	5	6	0	29
	Total	18	5	6	0	29

Rugby league
- Position: Centre, Wing, Stand-off, Fullback
Club
Years	Team	Pld	T	G	FG	P
1912	Clive	3	2	0	0	6
1913–14	Petane	8	2	3	0	12
	Total	11	4	3	0	18
Representative
Years	Team	Pld	T	G	FG	P
1908	South Canterbury	1	0	0	0	0
1910	Rotorua	1	1	0	0	3
1911	Te Kuiti-Huias	3	0	0	0	0
1912–14	Hawke's Bay	12	7	8	0	37
1912	Napier	2	0	1	0	5
1912–13	New Zealand	9	2	0	0	6

Daniel Henry Verner Du Vall (23 December 1886 – 12 October 1917) was a New Zealand professional rugby league footballer who played in the 1910s. He played at representative level for New Zealand, and Hawke's Bay, as a centre.

== Sporting career ==
=== Rugby union in Auckland ===
Du Vall began playing rugby in Auckland for the Grammar School Old Boy senior side in 1907 and played at least 5 matches for them in the 'Old Boys' senior rugby competition. Later in the season he played 3 matches for the A Battery team. They competed in the Auckland Volunteer Rugby Union along with 4 other sides (Nos. 8 and 9 Companies Garrison Artillery, the College Rifles RFC, and No. 3 Natives).

=== Move to Timaru, rugby league game and disqualification from rugby union ===
At some point in 1908 Du Vall moved to the Timaru area and took part in a match between a South Canterbury rugby league team and Invercargill who were touring at the time. Invercargill won the match in front of just 100 spectators by 19-2. In 1909 he began playing for the Kaikorai rugby club in Dunedin and the rugby authorities became aware of his participation in the rugby league match and investigated. He denied that he had played in the match and stated that his name was "V Duval and not F Duval" but it was eventually established that he had played after fellow players identified him via a photograph. He stated to the authorities that he had been disqualified from playing in Auckland until the end of the 1908 season for playing for the Battery side when he was not officially a member of the club.

In the meantime he had been allowed to play for Kaikorai while the investigations were taking place. In a match with Southern in early July he was very badly injured in a collision with two Southern players. He was taken to the hospital in a serious condition, and it seemed that he had badly injured his spine. However, he made good progress, and was able to move his limbs by the next morning and was "progressing favourably". He ultimately ended up playing 10 matches for them in the five-eighth position scoring 5 tries and kicking 6 goals.

=== Bay of Plenty rugby league and athletics ===
In 1911 Du Vall moved to the Te Kūiti area and competed in athletic meetings early in the year. During the football season he played for the Te Kuiti-Huia's rugby league team in matches against Taumarunui, Manunui, and Rotorua where he was captain in a 29-2 defeat. Against Taumarunui they lost 10-5 on the Te Kūiti Domain. The match with Manunui in Taumarunui was also lost by the narrow margin of 8-7.

=== Clive, Petane and Hawke's Bay ===
Du Vall then moved to the Hawke's Bay and joined the Clive rugby league club in the newly formed Hawke's Bay rugby league competition. He was selected to play in all 6 of Hawke's Bay's representative matches in 1912 against Wellington, Auckland, Hamilton, Wanganui, New South Wales, and Canterbury. He was a prolific point scorer in these matches scoring 6 tries and kicking 5 goals. The match with Auckland was at Victoria Park in Auckland and saw the home side win 26-8. Du Vall scored a try and kicked a penalty in the loss. He also played 2 matches for the Napier side against Dannevirke. In 1913 Du Vall switched to the Petane club where he played at least 8 matches over 2 seasons with them. He played 2 matches for Hawke's Bay during the 1913 season against Poverty Bay on 13 September where he scored a try in front of 1,500 spectators in Napier. Then he played against the touring New South Wales side. The match was played in Napier with a large crowd of 4,000 in attendance. New South Wales won comfortably by 31 to 10 with Du Vall kicking a conversion and a penalty. 1914 saw Du Vall play 4 more times for Hawke's Bay. The first match was at Napier against Wellington on 3 June. Wellington won 18-3. He was picked in the Hawke's Bay side to play the touring England on 18 July. The match was played at Nelson Park with around 6,000 spectators packing the ground. Du Vall converted Hawke's Bay's only try by Ellison from the sideline which made the score 12-5, though England went on to win comfortably 30-7. His last two matches for Hawke's Bay were against Canterbury and Wellington. Canterbury won 25 to 8 with Du Vall kicking a conversion. While against Wellington, Hawke's Bay were trounced 62-16 in the match at the Basin Reserve though Du Vall had to leave the field with a knee injury after just a few minutes.

=== International honours ===
Du Vall's form in the 1912 season for Hawke's Bay was good enough to gain him selection for the New Zealand side against New South Wales. The match was played on 7 September at the Auckland Domain in front of 20,000 spectators. New Zealand lost the match 18-10 with Du Vall playing in the five eighth position. Then in 1913 he made the New Zealand side for Australia. He played 8 matches there and scored 2 tries both of which were against Toowoomba on 18 June 1913. He scored the first try of the match after receiving a pass from Bill Kelly, while his second try was New Zealand's third and pushed their lead out to 11-3 with New Zealand going on to win 32-6 in front of 1,500 spectators at the Toowoomba Showgrounds. The other tour matches he played in were against New South Wales (9 June), Northern Division (11 June), Queensland (14 June), Ipswich (16 June), New South Wales (21 June and 23 June), and Orange (26 June). Du Vall played on the wing in 5 of the matches, and at fullback in the matches with Ipswich, Orange, and the 23 June match with New South Wales.

=== Athletics career ===
Du Vall competed in several athletics meetings primarily as a middle distance runner with some success. After he moved to Timaru he competed in the South Canterbury Caledonian Society meeting in January 1909. He won the 440 yard race but was badly spiked during the race and had to go to hospital for treatment. While the investigation was taking place as to if he had played in the rugby league match in late 1908 it was even suggested that they look at his leg to see the spike injury to try and determine his identity. In the 1909 annual Geraldine St Patrick's Sports Association meeting on 17 March he competed in the 220 yard hurdles, the 440 yards, 880 yards, 75 yards (2nd), and the 130 yards Sheffield (1st). In a 12 April meeting at Temuka he finished 2nd in the 120 yard handicap race. In 1910 he competed in the Te Puke Athletic Club meeting at Mr. Montgomery's paddock on Easter Monday. He placed 3rd in the 100 yard race, 2nd in the 220 yard race, and 2nd in the 440 yard race.

In 1911 he took part in the Te Kuiti Sports event on 1 March. He came second in the 220 yard race. Then in 1915 he competed in the Elsthorpe Athletic Club's 13th annual sports meeting in January. He placed 3rd in the shotput, won the 100 yard race, and finished 2nd in the mounted Rescue Event. At the Petane Sheep Dog trial sports events on 22 March Du Vall placed 2nd in the 100 yard race, 1st in the 220 yard race, and 2nd in the football place kicking contest.

== World War I service and death ==
Du Vall enlisted in the 1st Battalion, Canterbury Infantry Regiment, New Zealand Expeditionary Force on 25 July 1916. He rose to the rank of sergeant and was killed in action at the First Battle of Passchendaele in Belgium on 12 October 1917. Du Vall was initially listed as missing after going over the top with a group of men. A shell struck them killing 5 and wounding 2. A search for Du Vall failed to find him and it was assumed by eye witnesses that the shell must have struck him directly. He was awarded the British War Medal and the Victory Medal posthumously and they were sent to his mother Mrs. C. Harrison, who was living in Dunedin. He is memorialized on the Tyne Cot Memorial to the Missing.

== Personal life ==
Henry Du Vall attended Auckland Grammar School. In mid-November 1907, just short of his 21st birthday Du Vall appeared in court and admitted that he was the father of an "unborn illegitimate child", and he was being accused by the mother of the child and her sister of planning to leave New Zealand for Fiji without "making provision for [the child's] maintenance. He denied having any plans to leave New Zealand and the judge expressed the opinion that it was all a misunderstanding. He ordered the case "down for a week, both sides agreeing". On his military enrolment records Du Vall stated that he was single and a self employed clerk. At the time of his enrolment he was living at the Union Hotel in Port Ahuriri, Napier.
