= Stan Weston =

New Zealand international rugby league footballer

Personal information
- Full name: Stanley James Weston
- Born: 26 November 1889 Auckland, New Zealand
- Died: 23 December 1967 (aged 78) Whangārei, New Zealand

Playing information
- Position: Wing
Club
Years	Team	Pld	T	G	FG	P
1911–15	North Shore	23	9	1	0	29
Representative
Years	Team	Pld	T	G	FG	P
1911–14	Auckland	14	8	0	0	24
1912–14	New Zealand	5	0	0	0	0

Stanley James Weston (26 November 1889 – 23 December 1967) was a New Zealand rugby league footballer who represented New Zealand.

== Early life ==
Weston was born in Auckland to Stephen James Weston. He had two brothers and three sisters. His younger brother, Lyn Weston, played rugby union.

== Playing career ==
Weston played for the North Shore club in the Auckland Rugby League competition and represented Auckland. He played for North Shore from 1911 to 1914 when he retired from playing. He did, however, take up refereeing and began refereeing senior club games in the 1917 season.

He was selected for New Zealand as part of the 1912 tour of Australia, although no test matches were played on the tour. In 1914 he played in one test match against the touring Great Britain Lions.

== Later life ==
Weston refeered a rugby union match between Waikato and the touring British Lions in Hamilton on 2 August 1930.

Lyn and Stan Weston were both garage proprietors in Whangārei in the 1930s. He died in Whangārei on 23 December 1967 and was buried at Maunu Cemetery.
