= Billy Curran =

New Zealand international rugby league footballer

Personal information
- Full name: William Curran
- Born: 1890 Oamaru, New Zealand
- Died: 31 October 1944 (aged 53–54)

Playing information
- Height: 187 cm (6 ft 2 in)
- Weight: 88 kg (13 st 12 lb)
- Position: Wing, Centre
Club
Years	Team	Pld	T	G	FG	P
1912	Newton Rangers	1	0	0	0	0
1912–15	Wigan	66	60	0	0	180
	Total	67	60	0	0	180
Representative
Years	Team	Pld	T	G	FG	P
1912	Auckland	6	3	1	0	11
1912	Auckland B	1	0	0	0	0
1912	New Zealand	6	1	0	0	3

Billy Curran was a New Zealand rugby league player who represented New Zealand.

== Playing career ==
Curran was playing rugby union in Auckland before switching codes and joining the Newton Rangers. He played one match for Newton on 8 June against Manukau and was then selected for representative matches. He debuted for Auckland and played 6 matches for them in the same season. He was selected to tour Australia in 1912 for New Zealand.

In December 1912 he left for England, after being signed by Wigan on the recommendation of George A. Gillett. He played three seasons for Wigan, being part of Lancashire League winning sides each year.
