= Mick Dervan =

Irish hurler

Personal information
- Native name: Mícheál Ó Doirbheáin (Irish)
- Born: 19 May 1898 Tynagh, County Galway, Ireland
- Died: 3 April 1981 (aged 82) Loughrea, County Galway, Ireland

Sport
- Sport: Hurling
- Position: Corner-back
Club
- Years: Club
- Tynagh
Club titles
- Galway titles: 5
Inter-county
- Years: County
- 1922-1928: Galway
Inter-county titles
- Connacht titles: 1
- All-Irelands: 1
- NHL: 0

Michael Dervan (19 May 1898 – 3 April 1981) was an Irish hurler. Usually lining out at corner-back, he was a member of the Galway team that won the 1923 All-Ireland Championship.

At a club level, Dervan played with Tynagh GAA club. After joining the club's senior team in his late teens, he won five Galway Senior Hurling Championship medals in 1920, 1922, 1923, 1925, and 1928.

After being selected for the Galway senior team in 1922, he won a Connacht medal in his debut championship. He won his sole All-Ireland medal in 1923 after Galway's defeat of Limerick in the final. Dervan was a runner-up in three subsequent All-Ireland finals and two National Hurling League finals and retired from inter-county hurling in 1928.

Dervan was included on the Ireland team at the Tailteann Games in 1924 and 1928, for which he was awarded gold medals.

He was named in the left corner-back position on the Galway Team of the Millennium. Dervan died after a short illness on 3 April 1981.

== Honours ==
Tynagh

- Galway Senior Hurling Championship (5): 1920, 1922, 1923, 1925, 1928

Galway

- All-Ireland Senior Hurling Championship (1): 1923
- Connacht Senior Hurling Championship (1): 1922
