= Tom Brownlee (rugby league) =

New Zealand international rugby league footballer

Personal information
- Full name: Thomas Henry Brownlee
- Born: 8 February 1886 Thames, New Zealand
- Died: 15 July 1915 (aged 29) Thames, New Zealand

Playing information
- Weight: 74 kg (11 st 9 lb)
- Position: Forward
Representative
Years	Team	Pld	T	G	FG	P
≤1912–≥12	Thames
1912	New Zealand	0	0	0	0	0

Thomas Brownlee was a New Zealand professional rugby league footballer who played in the 1910s. He played at representative level for New Zealand, and Thames, as a forward.

== International honours ==
Brownlee represented New Zealand in 1912 on their tour of Australia and also played for Thames. Thames was a sub-league of the Auckland Rugby League at the time.

== Death ==
Thomas Brownlee died at home in Thames after a "long illness" which confined him to bed for months. He was married (Bertha) and aged 29. The Ohinemuri Gazette wrote that "the funeral of Thomas Henry Brownlee took place at Thames on Saturday, and was one of the largest seen for many years, the deceased being a very popular young man".
