= Harold Hayward =

NZ dual-code international rugby footballer

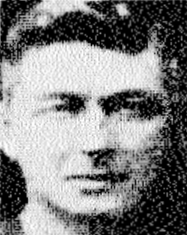

Personal information
- Full name: Harold Owen Hayward
- Born: 23 May 1883 Blenheim, New Zealand
- Died: 25 July 1970 (aged 87) Thames, New Zealand

Playing information

Rugby union
- Position: Flanker
Club
Years	Team	Pld	T	G	FG	P
1903–11	Auckland	33
Representative
Years	Team	Pld	T	G	FG	P
1908	New Zealand	1	1	0	0	3

Rugby league
- Position: Loose forward
Representative
Years	Team	Pld	T	G	FG	P
1912	Thames
1912–14	Auckland	12	5	0	0	15
1912–13	New Zealand	14	7	0	0	21
- As of 10 August 2012
- Relatives: Morgan Hayward (brother)

Harold "Circus" Owen Hayward (1883–1970) was a New Zealand rugby football player who represented New Zealand in both rugby union and rugby league. His brother, Morgan, also represented New Zealand in rugby league.

== Rugby union career ==
Growing up in Thames, Hayward played rugby union for the Goldfields sub-union and represented Auckland. His 33 appearances for Auckland between 1903 and 1911 were, however, sporadic – undoubtedly because he lived so far away from the city.

Hayward played for New Zealand against the touring Anglo-Welsh Lions in on 25 July 1908. He also made his sole appearance for the North Island in 1908.

== Rugby league career ==
Hayward switched to rugby league in 1912 and made an immediate impact, playing for Thames, Auckland and touring Australia with New Zealand that year. Like Goldfields, Thames was a sub-league of the Auckland Rugby League at the time.

Hayward captained the 1913 New Zealand tour of Australia and played for Auckland against Great Britain in 1914.

== Return to rugby union ==
Hayward returned to rugby union after World War One.
