= Charles Webb (rugby league) =

New Zealand international rugby league footballer

Personal information
- Born: 1888 New Zealand
- Died: Deceased

Playing information

Rugby union
Club
Years	Team	Pld	T	G	FG	P
1908–12	Ponsonby RFC	37	8	12	0	50
Representative
Years	Team	Pld	T	G	FG	P
1909	Auckland

Rugby league
- Position: Halfback
Club
Years	Team	Pld	T	G	FG	P
1912–17	Ponsonby United	34	5	32	1	81
Representative
Years	Team	Pld	T	G	FG	P
1912–1914	Auckland	17	3	19	0	47
1912–13	New Zealand	3	1	1	0	5

Charles Webb was a New Zealand rugby league footballer who represented New Zealand .

== Playing career ==
Webb originally played rugby union, representing the Ponsonby club and also playing for Auckland. He was a halfback and switched codes around 1912, playing for the Ponsonby United rugby league club, Webb also represented Auckland. In 5 seasons with Ponsonby he made 34 appearances.

In 1912, Webb was named in the New Zealand team to tour Australia however he was unable to travel. He made his debut for New Zealand in their match with Auckland prior to the tour. He scored a try in a 38-16 win.

Later that year, New South Wales made a return tour to New Zealand. Webb captained the New Zealand side that played against them, losing 10-18. He also played in two matches for Auckland against the touring Blues side.

Webb was selected for the 1913 tour of Australia, but withdrew from the side again.

In 1914, the Great Britain Lions toured New Zealand and Webb played for Auckland in a match against them.
