= Billy Dervan =

New Zealand international rugby league footballer

Personal information
- Full name: William Edward Dervan
- Born: 17 April 1884 Auckland, New Zealand
- Died: 18 April 1944 (aged 60) Auckland, New Zealand

Playing information
- Position: Loose forward
Club
Years	Team	Pld	T	G	FG	P
1912	Newton Rangers	4	5	4	0	23
Representative
Years	Team	Pld	T	G	FG	P
1912	New Zealand	4	0	0	0	0

Billy Dervan is a New Zealand rugby league player who represented New Zealand.

== Playing career ==
From Auckland, Dervan was selected on the 1912 New Zealand tour of Australia. No test matches were played on this tour. He had originally played rugby for the City club before switching to rugby league and joining the Newton Rangers in the 1912 season. He retired at the end of the season and was on the Newton committee in 1913.

== Boxing ==
Dervan was heavily involved in boxing in Auckland and was the official announcer for events for over 20 years.

== Death ==
Dervan died suddenly at the age of 60 on 18 April 1944. He had been attending the boxing at the Town Hall the night before (on his 60th birthday) as a spectator when he began feeling unwell. Dervan was survived by his wife Ivy May Derwan (nee Hodgson), daughter, and son.
