= Joe Bennett (rugby league) =

New Zealand international rugby league player (1883–1965)

Personal information
- Full name: Edward Joseph Bennett
- Born: 14 October 1883 Awhitu, Franklin, New Zealand
- Died: 9 May 1965 (aged 81) Ōtāhuhu, Auckland, New Zealand

Playing information
- Height: 5 ft 10 in (1.78 m)
- Weight: 87 kg (13 st 10 lb)

Rugby union
- Position: Three-quarter
Club
Years	Team	Pld	T	G	FG	P
1903–09	Waiuku	32	7	3	2	37
1907–09	City/Central (Waiuku)	17	4	7	0	27
1910	City (Auckland)	1	0	0	0	0
	Total	50	11	10	2	64
Representative
Years	Team	Pld	T	G	FG	P
1906	Franklin (trial)	1	0	0	0	0
1906	Franklin	1	0	0	0	0

Rugby league
- Position: Second-row, Hooker, Prop
Club
Years	Team	Pld	T	G	FG	P
1910–17	Newton Rangers	53	19	19	0	95
1910	Combined Club	1	1	0	0	3
1920	Grafton Athletic	8	0	1	0	2
	Total	62	20	20	0	100
Representative
Years	Team	Pld	T	G	FG	P
1910–20	Auckland (trial)	5	3	0	0	9
1910–20	Auckland	20	16	2	0	52
1914–20	Auckland XIII	3	0	0	0	0
1914	Auckland Colts	1	0	0	0	0
1920	North Island	1	0	0	0	0
1920	New Zealand	2	0	0	0	0

Edward Joseph Bennett (14 October 1883 – 9 May 1965) was a New Zealand rugby league footballer. Bennett played in the second row position. He represented the New Zealand rugby league team in two test matches against England in 1920. In the process he became the 144th player to represent New Zealand. He also played for the Waiuku rugby club, and the Newton Rangers, and Grafton Athletic rugby league clubs. Bennett also represented the Auckland and North Island rugby league teams.

== Early life ==
Edward Joseph (Joe) Bennett was born on 14 October 1883, in Waiuku. His parents were George (1840–1914) and Lydia Bennett (née Starke) (1843–1894). He had 7 brothers and 3 sisters: George (1866–1910), Charles James (b. 1867), Charles John (b. 1869), Fanny (1872–1932), Annie (b. 1874), Henry (b. 1876), Frederick (b. 1877), Benjamin (1878–1902), Arthur (b. 1881), and Ellen (b. 1882).

== Boer War ==
Bennett enlisted in the Boer War on 5 January 1902, aged 18. He embarked on the Surrey with the New Zealand Mounted Rifles, 8th contingent, North Island regiment – C Squadron on 1 February 1902, from Lyttelton. There had been 4,000 applications for the war but only 1,000 were accepted. It was recorded at the time that he weighed 11 st 12lb, and was 5 foot 10. Bennett was a Wesleyan and in the war his rank was of a Private. The war finished on 31 May of the same year and the returning soldiers set sail for New Zealand in July. His occupation at the time as a painter and this was his occupation throughout his life. After returning from the war he was awarded the King's South Africa Medal (South Africa 1902 clasp). In November 1902 Bennett was on board the Elingamite passenger ship which sank on its way from Sydney to Auckland.

== Playing career ==
=== Rugby union in Waiuku ===
In 1903 Bennett was chosen in the Waiuku rugby senior squad at the start of the season. The team only played 6 matches in the season with other competing sides being Pukekohe, Bombay, Wairoa, and Tuakau. Waiuku finished runners up to Pukekohe, with the competition receiving very little coverage in the newspapers.

The 1904 season received more coverage. Waiuku held their annual meeting on 23 April. Bennett was awarded the D. Wilson cap for being the best forward in the 1903 season and it was also stated that he was the captain of the side. Bennett played in at least 7 matches, and scored 3 tries, kicked a conversion, and a drop goal for 13 total points. In a preseason match against Suburbs District Club on 30 April, they lost 7–0. Bennett was said to have been one of the "most conspicuous" players for Waiuku. The Auckland Star reported that Bennett played wing-forward and "did good work". In a match against Wairoa on Mr. Barriball's paddock on 18 June, Bennett scored a second half try in a 12–0 win. Then on 27 July against the same opponent on Mr. McNicol's ground at Clevedon, Bennett scored both of Waiuku's tries in a 6–6 draw. They both came in the first half.

It was reported in the New Zealand Herald on 3 August that as a result of conduct in the match against Pukekohe on 9 July (3 weeks earlier), "the Waiuku Football Club was disqualified until the end of 1905, and one member of the team for ten years, for misconduct towards the referee in the match, Pukekohe v. Waiuku". It had been arranged at halftime that the second half should be 35 minutes long but only 25 minutes was played. Waiuku had led at halftime 9–3 but Pukekohe had taken the lead 12–9 when the whistle was blown for full time. "Remonstration was made, but the whistle had been blown, and the game was over". It is highly likely that the disqualified player was in fact Bennett as he was captain and it was mentioned at the start of the 1905 season that he was indeed disqualified from the game. He did however play in a friendly match late in the 1904 season against Onehunga in Onehunga. He kicked a drop goal in a 10–6 win. He also played in an end of season match between Married Men and club players. At the start of the 1905 season in a preview of various competitions it was said that "Bennett, the Waiuku 13st. three-quarter, whose disqualification, the club anticipate, will be removed". It seems that the disqualification of the Waiuku club was enforced and they did not play a single match in 1905.

In 1906 Bennett was again captaining Waiuku as they reinterred the competition. On 19 May they opened their season with a match against Bombay on Mr. Barriball's Paddock. The match ended in a 0–0 draw. He played in further matches against Drury, Pukekohe, Wairoa, Pukekohe, and Tuakau through May and June. Then in another match with Tuakau on 21 July he scored a try in a 6–3 win. He was then chosen in a Franklin Rugby Union trial match for 28 July for the Blue and White team to play the Maroon team. On 25 August Bennett was due to play for Franklin sub union side against an Auckland Secondary Schools Old Boys XV at Pukekohe. However the game was cancelled as the Auckland side was not affiliated to the Auckland Rugby Union and they refused to give permission for the match to take place. Franklin then cancelled their match against the Wednesday Rugby Union later that week. On 8 September Bennett did get to play for Franklin against a combined Ōtāhuhu-Wairoa district team with Bennett in the three-quarters. Franklin was supposed to play another match against the Wednesday Rep side on 12 September, but there was no reporting of the match.

At the start of the 1907 season on 6 April Bennett was elected on to the management committee of the Waiuku Football Club. The club also agreed to affiliate with the Auckland Rugby Union. He was also chosen as vice-captain with J. Hone as captain. The Waiuku effectively divided into 3 clubs and formed a tiny sub-union for the 1907 season. Waiuku East became Otaua, Waiuku West became Waipipi, and Central became City. Bennett was part of the City side, and they opened the season with a 0–0 draw against Waipipi. He then played in matches against Ōtāhuhu on 8 June, and then Otaua on 22 June at Waiuku where City were based. He kicked a conversion in a 9–5 loss. Bennett played in two more matches against Waipipi, kicking another conversion in the second of these which City won, 19–3. Otaua won the competition, undefeated through 6 matches. Bennett refereed the final match of the season which secured Otaua the title. Following the match Bennett was selected to play for Waiuku against Ōtāhuhu on 3 August. Waiuku travelled to the match which was played at Onehunga by the launch, Edie. Bennett "potted a goal, after being thrown to the ground" and this ultimately turned out to be the winning of the game as Waiuku held on for a 4–3 win. At this time a potted goal was worth 4 points. On 10 August Waiuku played Auckland Juniors with the junior side winning 8–6. Bennett scored a try for Waiuku but missed the conversion, and then near full time Waiuku scored again but Bennett missed the conversion which would have drawn the match. Waiuku played another match against North Shore before a return game against Auckland Juniors at Alexandra Park on 7 September. The Auckland side won 26–0 though it was said that Bennett along with 5 teammates "were most prominent for the visitors, playing good football". In late September a concert was held by the Waiuku Rugby Union in the Town Hall where he was presented with "the champion gold medal, won at the football race".

At the start of the 1908 season Waiuku Rugby Football Union held their first ever annual meeting as they were forming a small sub-union at the Kentish Hotel. In City's first match of the season against on 17 May against Waipipi, Bennett scored 2 tries, converted one, and kicked a goal from a mark in a 14–3 win at the Waiuku Domain. Two weeks later he scored a try in a 6–3 win over Otaua at the Domain ground. They maintained their unbeaten start to the season with a 5–0 win over Waipipi with Bennett converting their only try "from a difficult kick". Although the Auckland Star mentioned that it was from between the posts. The Auckland Star in a report of the match named the City side as "Central" which was the name they had changed to at some point early in the season. Bennet was said to have played a "sterling game" in the backs along with V. Barriball. Central then beat Otaua on 21 June with Bennett converting one of their 4 tries. Central suffered their first defeat of the season when they lost 6–5 to Waipipi. Bennett scored all Central's points when he scored a try which he converted "from the touch line".

A week later Bennett played for the Waiuku side in a friendly match with the North Shore club on the Waiuku Domain. Waiuku won the match 15–0 with Bennett scoring a try which he converted, along with 2 penalties. Central then played their final match of the season and with a 3–0 win over Otaua on 12 July they secured the "Molloy, Herrold, and Potter Silver cup and the caps". Waiuku then played a match against Northern Wairoa at Dargaville on 25 July which was drawn 3–3. Their next match was against Auckland Juniors on 1 August (lost 6–3), and then Northern Wairoa again on 15 August. The last match was a return match on Waiuku Domain and saw Waiuku run out 14–9 winners with Bennett scoring one of their 4 tries. He was then selected in their side to play their final match of the season against Auckland Juniors on 29 August. Auckland Juniors won a "very poor and lifeless" game 6 points to 3.

The 1909 season saw very little coverage of the Waiuku competition and the only mention of Bennett came in a 4 September match against Auckland Juniors. City/Central won the Waiuku competition again after 2 rounds and there was no need for a third round. In the 4 September match, played at Alexandra Park, The Auckland Juniors beat Waiuku 25–6 with Bennett kicking both of Waiuku's penalties near the end of the match. The New Zealand Herald reported that he "stood out on his own in the Waiuku team"

=== Move to the City rugby club in Auckland ===
In 1920 Bennett moved to Auckland and joined the City Rugby Club. He made his debut for them in a match against Parnell on 28 May at Alexandra Park on the No. 1 field. City won 6–3 but it was said in the Observer newspaper that "Bennett, a recruit from Waiuku, did not shape very satisfactorily. He may have been suffering from "grandstand fright", but still he does not appear to be any great gun". The Herald also commented that "Bennett at threequarters may have been nervous but his failure to take high kicks caused his side a lot of anxiety. He may overcome this fault in a couple of games". He was not to get another chance to redeem himself as he was not selected for City's matches with Ponsonby or University on 4 and 18 June respectively. And then he made the switch to the rugby league code.

== Rugby league ==
=== Joins Newton Rangers rugby league club ===
On 25 June Bennett appeared for Newton Rangers in the Auckland Rugby League first grade competition. He scored 3 tries in their 16–5 win on Victoria Park. His first try came when he took a pass from Bonner and scored under the posts. The second was after Bradburn punted over the North Shore backs and "Bennett followed on very quickly, and snapping up the oval, raced across the line". He scored again a few minutes later but failed to convert his try, and he had missed 2 shots at goal earlier in the match. Surprisingly following their next match against Ponsonby United on 2 July he was selected in the Auckland trial match to help the selectors choose the team to play the touring England team. He was picked in the B Team in the second row. The match was played on Victoria Park on 16 July before a crowd of 2,000. Bennett scored 2 tries in a 20–18 loss. He played well enough to be named after the match in the reserves for Auckland. His weight was listed in the Auckland Star as 13st, 10lbs. He ultimately did not take the field in the match as substitutions were only allowed for first half injuries. Bennett was also chosen in the New Zealand extended 17 man squad to play England but was not required to play in the 30 July test. On 27 August he played for a Combined club side against City Rovers who had won the championship before 300 spectators. He scored a try in an 8–6 win to the combined team.

=== Auckland selection ===
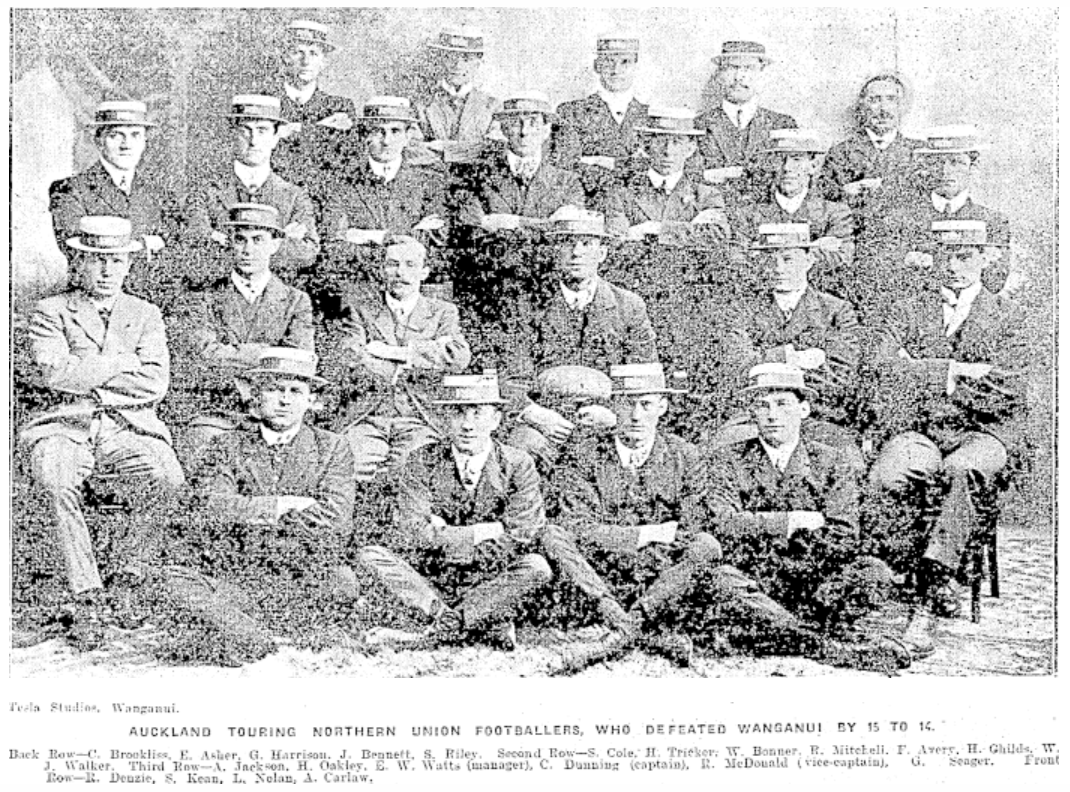

Bennett was then chosen for Auckland's seven match Southern Tour. Prior to departing the touring Auckland side played an Auckland selection made up from the best players not going on the tour. Auckland won the match easily 49–6 at the Auckland Domain with Bennett scoring 1 of their 16 tries. Bennett played in the first tour match against Wanganui at Cooks Gardens in Whanganui on 22 September. Auckland won the match 15–14 with Bennett scoring a first half try. The Wanganui Herald reported that "the best of the Aucklanders on the play were Bennett, Dunning, and Fricker (forwards)…" He then played 5 days later on 27 September against Bluff at Queens Park, Invercargill. He set up Auckland's first try in a 42–12 win after he received the ball at the Bluff 25 and "running strongly, fed Seagar, as his nearest attendant, enabling the latter to score near the posts", he failed to convert the try however. In total he missed 5 conversions but was successful with 2. Auckland played Southland the very next day and won 17–12, once again on Queens Park in Invercargill. Before a crowd of 2,000 Bennett scored twice. His first try came after Auckland drove Southland back to their line and from loose play Bennett and Charles Dunning combined for Bennett to score to make it 6–3 to Auckland. His second saw him win a race to the ball after it was kicked ahead into the Southland in goal area to make it 11–3 in Auckland's favour. Although Auckland played 4 more matches on the tour Bennett only played in the first of those against a combined Otago/Southland team on 1 October at the Caledonian Ground in Dunedin. Before 1,500 spectators Auckland won 30–18 with Bennett crossing the line for another try. He was involved in a passing movement with Lionel Nolan and Sid Kean which saw the later score, and then "a moment later Bennett got away, fooled the full-back with a feint to pass, and scored under the posts" to give Auckland a 17–13 lead. Auckland played matches against Nelson, Hawke's Bay, and Dannevirke before returning to Auckland.

=== Newton Rangers management committee ===
In 1911 Bennett was selected on the Newton Rangers management committee at their annual meeting on 31 March at the Caledonian Hotel. He then played in practice matches against North Shore and Ponsonby on 6 and 13 May respectively before beginning the Myers Cup 1st Grade championship on 20 May with another match against Ponsonby which they lost 19–3. They then lost to City Rovers 16–3 in round 2 and had a bye in round 3. Bennett was chosen for the Auckland side to play New Zealand on 10 June. The New Zealand side was preparing to depart for their tour of Australia. Bennett scored 2 tries in a 16–14 loss for Auckland in the match which was played at the Takapuna Racecourse. It appears that he played in the hooker position due to his listing second in the forwards alongside props Jim Griffin and Harry Fricker. The New Zealand Herald said "Bennett, who was playing a fine game, took the ball on at his feet, and well supported by other Auckland forwards, play was carried to within a few yards of New Zealand's line". A short time later Bennett failed to convert Fricker's try. Early in the second half with Auckland on attack "Bennett wedged his way through the last line of defence and scored". Soon after he led the forwards in a forward rush that took play to midfield and after a back line passing rush they scored. His second try came with the score 13–11 in New Zealand's favour, with Auckland making a forward attack that "culminated in Bennett scoring" to make it 14–13 to Auckland. New Zealand scored with a few minutes to go to claim victory.

Bennett then resumed his club season with Newton and kicked 2 conversions in a 13–8 win over Eden Ramblers, and a penalty in a 17–2 loss to North Shore. Against Ponsonby in round 6 he had the distinction of scoring all of his sides 13 points through 3 tries and 2 conversions, however Newton were still well beaten by 32 points to 13. He kicked 2 penalties in another loss a week later against City by 32 points to 12. Bennett was captaining the side and the Auckland Star commented that "the skipper of the side, Bennett, is one of the strongest forward players in the league, and his determined dashes, while gaining ground for his side, add energy to the despairing hopes of players about to cave in. Bennett evidently is a firm believer in the maxim, "while there's life there's hope" and never showed it more than on Saturday... Bennett led his team in a dashing manner to the assault on the City line, and kept flagging spirits up to the last. His goal-kicking was particularly bright, but in this respect he is a man who shows best with difficult kicks".

Following a match against Eden on 22 July which Newton won 8–0 Bennett was selected for Auckland's match against the returning New Zealand team. This time Auckland won the match 11–3 before a crowd of 700 at the Takapuna Racecourse. Bennett missed a conversion but was involved in several prominent pieces of play, at one point nearly scoring in the corner.

=== Auckland selection and season point record ===
Bennett was then chosen for 6 of Auckland's 7 matches in their representative programme and finished the season with 27 points for them. More than any other player. His first match against a domestic side was with Wellington on 5 August at Victoria Park before 5,000 spectators. He scored a try in a 16–8 win. His try came in the second half when, after some forward play near the Wellington line he "fell across with the ball and scored in a good position" to give Auckland an 11–8 lead. A week later in a 36–22 win over Lower Waikato at Frankton near Hamilton, Bennett scored 4 tries. The first came after Frank Morse kicked ahead and Bennett won the race to the ball. The second came from Jim Rukutai taking a pass from Robinson, which he sent back, and then on to Bennett who scored. He scored his third after a series of scrums near the corner, while he added a fourth late in the match.

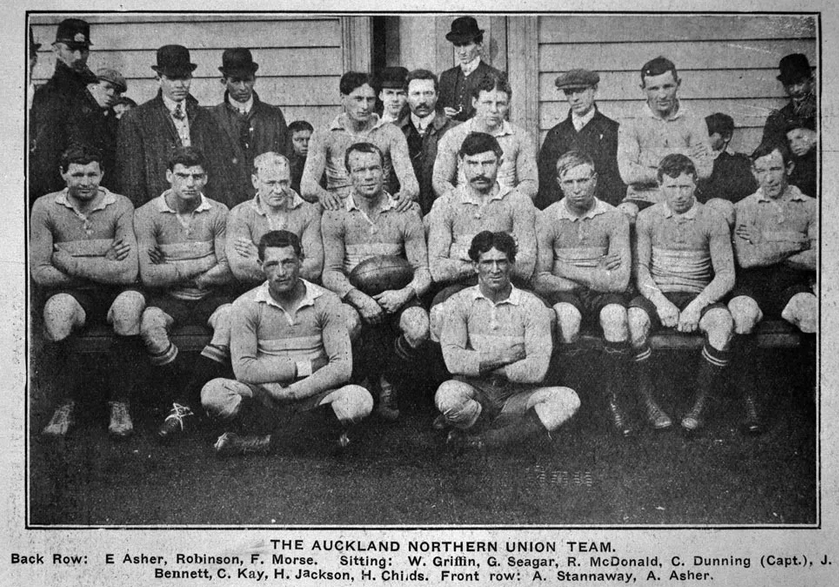

He played in Auckland's next match against Hawke's Bay despite not being initially selected. Auckland won 17–13 at Victoria Park on August 19 and he then played again for Auckland against Nelson at Victoria Park on 26 August before 5,000 spectators. Auckland won easily 36–12 though Bennett did not score. After the match he was chosen for Auckland's match with Taranaki. Auckland won 26–15, once again at Victoria Park with a record crowd of 6,000 in attendance. A week later on 9 September Bennett scored 2 tries in a 22–10 win over the touring Hawke's Bay Māori side at the Takapuna Racecourse. Bennett opened Auckland's scoring with a long range try. He made a break from "his own 25, and having a clear run out-paced all his opponents, placing the ball between the visitors' posts, 20 minutes after play started". Charles Dunning converted the try to make the score 5–0. In the second half he broke away and scored again but his conversion attempt hit the post. Immediately after the kick off he made another break but a forward pass cost a try. Auckland played one further match against a Country side however Bennett was not selected. He finished the representative season having played 7 matches and scored 9 tries, 3 more than the famous Albert Asher with 6.

=== Broken leg ===
The 1912 season was a short one for Bennett, ended in round 2 when he sustained a broken leg. Newton held their annual meeting in early April and he was once again elected for their management committee and was chosen as a delegate to the Auckland Rugby League. At the meeting it was also decided that Bennett, along with Arthur Francis, and George Gillett (both dual New Zealand rugby union and rugby league internationals) would be the senior team selectors for the year. In a brief write up of Newton's prospects for the season the New Zealand Herald wrote that Bennett was "last season's crack forward". Bennett's first match was against Eden Ramblers in round 1 on 8 May and he scored a try in a 28–9 win. The Auckland Star said that "in the forwards Bennett gave a fine exhibition. He keeps with the ball and proved dangerous in the loose".

The following week against North Shore Bennett scored once more in a 24–8 win at the Devonport Domain. The Herald reported that "Bennett, one of the Newton threequarters, had a small bone in one of his ankles displaced, and this will keep him out of the game for a month or so. Until he was hurt Bennett did much useful work". The injury was however more serious than thought and he missed the remainder of the season which saw Newton win their first ever first grade championship with an 8 win, 2 loss record. Bennett also missed the entire Auckland representative program.

At the start of the 1913 the Auckland Star noted that "Bennett, who spent the greater part of last season on the touchline owing to having had his leg broken in his second match led Newton as captain". He had again been elected to the management committee for Newton. Prior to the season commencing Mr. J.C. Gleeson had offered to present gold medals to the members of the Auckland team which had successfully retained the Northern Union Challenge Cup through the 1911 season of which Bennett was a part of.

Bennett was also in the news for another reason. He was a painter by trade and while working on a house on the corner of Ruatangata Road (Rautangi Road) and Mt. Eden Road he had an amount of paint stolen. The thief, Richard Sheppard Rowe had left a trail of paint from the house to his house across the road where a detective the following day found a shed finished in the same red colour as Bennett's missing paint. Rowe was fined £5 and costs.

=== Return to play in 1913 ===
In Newton's first game of the season on 3 May he kicked a conversion and a penalty in a 13–10 loss to North Shore. Bennett then scored a try and kicked a conversion in a 46–0 win over Eden at the Auckland Domain. Following a 22–5 win over Manukau, Newton lost 5–0 to City Rovers. Bennett and Brockliss were reported to have been "the pick of the Newton forwards". He scored a try in Newton's 17–12 win over City in round 6, and following a win over Ponsonby in round 7 the first grade competition was ceased with Newton runners up to North Shore. A knockout competition was then played with Bennett kicking a conversion in their 17–0 win over North Shore. The Herald said that he "worked like a trojan in the forwards, and led his men in good style". Though Newton finished runner up in this competition too after losing 25–5 to City in the final. Bennett was said to have "worked hard" in the forwards along with Bradburn. Auckland played 10 representative matches during the season however Bennett was not selected for any of them.

The 1914 season was a busy one for Bennett. He played all of Newton's matches and in all four of Auckland's matches along with a game for Auckland Colts against a Veteran side. Although by this point Bennett was 30 years old himself. In round 1 against Grafton Athletic Bennett scored a try in a 12–9 win. Thought the New Zealand Herald said Newton were disappointing and "the forwards, following the example of captain, Bennett, spent a great deal of time loafing off side. Bennett, however made up to some extent for his laziness by securing a good try after a determined charge through the ranks of the black and whites". Newton then lost to City 16–0 before a 10–10 draw with Otahuhu at Ōtāhuhu. The Herald this time said that "of the red and whites' weighty vanguard Bennett played much the best game". A loss to North Shore followed before another loss to Ponsonby, though Bennett set up Newton's only try in the 17–3 result. Bennett then scored a try in a 15–4 win over Grafton at Victoria Park, before kicking a penalty goal in a 21–8 loss to City. He was taking all of Newton's goal attempts at this time. Newton then handed Otahuhu their first victory when they were defeated by the team from South Auckland 10 points to 5. The Auckland Star reported that "Bennett was undoubtedly the star of the Newton pack. He was in the forefront of the attack, and worked untiringly the whole game". The week after the loss Newton only managed to field 8 players in a 43–2 thrashing by North Shore with two spectators joining in to help Newton. It is unknown if Bennett was one of the eight players, though given he was captaining the side this season it is likely he played.

Despite Newton's predicament Bennett's individual form had been good enough to be selected for an Auckland trial match to help choose the side before the England teams tour. Ponsonby and North Shore's players were unavailable due to them playing in the championship final. The players were therefore made up from Newton, City, Otahuhu and Grafton. Bennett was then selected by McDonald, Blakey, and Rowe for the Auckland side to take on England. Though the New Zealand Herald had a brutal assessment of his selection stating "with one exception, the forwards all deserve their places in the team, though why Bennett was selected one finds hard to understand. The Newton man has passed his best long since, and these are a dozen better forwards now in Auckland who should have had consideration before him.

The match with England was played at the Auckland Domain and saw England win easily by 34 points to 12 before a crowd estimated at around 13,000. Footage of the match still exists and is available online at the NGĀ TAONGA Sound and Vision website. England scored two early converted tries before "Bennett charged down a kick by an English forward", it ultimately led to nothing however. With England leading 15–2, Edward Fox "engineered a promising opening for Bennett, who sprinted try wards with the defence beaten. A better turn of speed would have crowned the effort but with a defender close upon his heels Bennett desperately swung the ball out to a wing man hustling to the rescue. And Englishman however secured possession, only to be promptly floored, and in the ensuing melee the visitors were penalised for offside and Karl Ifwersen taking the kick, the scoreboard again changed". The Herald described his run as "magnificent". In the second half Bennett dribbled the ball "at the head of the pack" and with play carried to the line Jim Clark scored to make the score 21–10. After the match the Herald remarked that "Bennett, who had the ball put in his hands and made a sensational dash for the line, is a light of other days". The Observer however said that Charles Savory, Jim Clark, and Bennett were "conspicuous amongst the Auckland vanguard".

Bennett was not selected for the New Zealand team to play in the test match the following week at the same venue. He was however chosen in an Auckland XIII to play the North Shore side as a curtain-raiser. The Auckland side won 18–9. Bennett was then picked for the Auckland team to play Waikato at the Auckland Domain on 8 August. Auckland won by 29 points to 8. Bennett scored their first try after a "pretty piece of passing" led to him crossing wide out. He was then involved in another passing movement with J McDonald and Edward Fox led to Jim Clark scoring. He was then selected to play against Taranaki at Victoria Park on 15 August. Before a crowd of 4,000 Auckland had an easy 35–4 win. Bennett once again crossed the line first in response to a penalty goal to Taranaki before Auckland poured on the points. Then a week later he was chosen for Auckland's final representative match of the season against Wellington. Auckland won a much closer match by 10 points to 6, once again at Victoria Park before 4,000 spectators meaning that they had retained the Northern Union Challenge Cup. With Auckland leading 5–0 "Bennett ran through the Wellington team, but was collared by the fullback, and in the melee Stan Walters and Harold Denize were put out of action with cuts in the head". The Observer said that "Bennett, Walters, and Savory were the pick of the forwards". To finish the season a match was played between a Veterans side and an Auckland Colts side as part of the Patriotic Fund carnival at Victoria Park on 29 August. Bennett was selected in the Colts side as he was obviously viewed as young enough, due to the makeup of the Veteran forward pack which include Alex Stanaway, Jack Stanaway, Jim Rukutai, Jim Griffen, Tom Avery, Charles Brockliss, W Baskeville, Charles Dunning, and William Tyler. The Veteran side won the match 23 points to 13 before 1,500 spectators.

The 1915 season saw Bennett in his sixth season for Newton. Following an 8 May, round 1 loss to City the Observer said that the "Newton forwards worked with a will, and perhaps Bennett calls for special mention". In round 2 Newton lost 24–3 to North Shore with Bennett scoring their lone try. Then the following week he scored their only points from a penalty in a 14–2 loss to Ponsonby United at the Auckland Domain. They lost again to Grafton in round 4, 15 to 11 though Bennett was mentioned along with Dick Tobin, Alan Blakey, Potae, and R. Clark as being "the most prominent of the Newton players".

At this point in the season a patriotic match was planned for 3 July to make up part of the "Patriotic Carnival" at the Auckland Domain. The Grafton Athletic club asked permission for Bennett to play for them. On 12 June a special seven-a-side tournament was played in aid of the Auckland Hospital Ship and Wounded Relief Fund at Victoria Park. Bennett was named in the Newton side. They beat Grafton B 10–0 in the first round, City B in the second round with Bennett scoring a try in the 15–10 win, before losing to North Shore 3 points to 2 in the semi-final.

On 19 June Newton registered their first, first grade win of the season with a 18–6 win over Otahuhu Rovers. Bennett scored a try and kicked 2 conversions. Against City a week later in a 16–13 loss Bennett was singled out by the Observer. They stated "Bennett was good when he liked, but seemed very tired. It is a pity that such a good player should mar his play by continually talking and appealing. The referee sees most things, and, to say the least, it is rather amusing to see a long red and white arm held up in the air when the owner should be in the pack 'doing his bit'". Newton then beat North Shore and Ponsonby with Bennett scoring a try in the later match. He then scored another try in their loss to Grafton. The New Zealand Herald said that he "was the pick of the forwards, but only one good opening came his way during the match, and a try resulted". The Observer also said he was the pick of the forwards and "the burly skipped led his men in fine style, and seized every opportunity that offered".

Newton ultimately finished second to last in the championship and then found themselves up against the last placed team, Otahuhu in the first round of the Roope Rooster. Newton won at Otahuhu by 24 points to 9. In round 2 they drew 2–2 with Grafton in windy, rainy conditions. The Auckland Star said that Bennett along with Rope "were outstanding for bustling, energetic play. The former was always as sturdy in defence as he was vigorous in the forward attack".

Bennett's form was good enough to gain selection for the Auckland team to play Thames on 28 August. Auckland won by 27 points to 16 in front of 4,000 at Victoria Park. Bennett was involved in an early attacking move and then a while later after a break, passed the ball to Cross who scored between the posts. He later missed a conversion attempt but then some time afterwards he "broke away with the leather, and kicked over the line, and Walters, who followed up fast, fell on it" to score. The Herald stated later that "Bennett, Rodgers, and Walters were the most conspicuous" of the Auckland forwards, and that Bennett "put in a great afternoon's work and undoubtedly was the best of the pack". A week later he played in the return match with Thames at Dodd's Paddock, Parawai in Thames. Thames won this time by 25 points to 13. Bennett was involved in one attacking movement but overall had a more quiet match.

Bennett's final match of the year was in the Roope Rooster final against North Shore. Newton lost narrowly by 10 points to 7 with Bennett scoring a try and kicking a penalty. On 18 September some patriotic matches were played in aid of the Waistcoat Fund which had been inaugurated by the Mayoress of Devonport. The matches were played at the Devonport Domain with a City Juniors v Rest of Auckland game, followed by a Referee's Association side playing the Junior Advisory Board, amongst other lower grade matches. Bennett was put in charge of the referees match as the referee.

In 1916 Bennett was once again named the captain of Newton. At the annual meeting of Newton Rangers, Mr. R. Spinley who was representing the Auckland Rugby League said that "the good work of Joe Bennett (Newton's captain), and Alan Blakey and H. Rowe (ex-players) would be remembered for many a day". In the opening round Newton lost heavily to Grafton Athletic 33 to 7. Bennett scored a try and kicked a penalty, with the Auckland Star saying that he "was the mainstay of the red and white pack, and at times he made some really good openings. Most of these however, went begging owing to the failure of the backs to give support in anything like a decent manner". The Newton side was struggling with a relatively weak forward pack with Bennett at the helm. They recorded their 4th consecutive loss on 10 June to Ponsonby 38–5 with only 11 players arriving for kick off. The Star reported that "the most useful man of the Newton teams was Bennett, its efficient skipper, to whom is probably due the credit for the only try secured by his side". Newton ultimately finished last with a 2 win, 8 loss record. In round 1 of the Roope Rooster Bennett scored a try in a 22–8 win over Otahuhu Rovers at Victoria Park with Bennett involved in his fair share of the work along with George and Arthur Iles, Thomas, Potier, and Castles.

As a signal of the respect that Bennett was held in, in rugby league circles, he was one of 5 players nominated for a gold medal competition for the most popular player in Auckland rugby league. The other players were Thomas (Scotty) McClymont (Ponsonby), Albert Asher (City), Karl Ifwersen (Grafton), and B Farrelly (Otahuhu). The results of the competition, which was put to the vote by spectators and announced at halftime in the Roope Rooster semi-final between City and Newton at Victoria Park saw Bennett come in 4th spot. There were 2,500 spectators there and the winner was McClymont, who played for New Zealand and would later go on to become a long time New Zealand coach, with 714 votes. Asher was second with 547, and Ifwersen third with 230. Bennett finished fourth and Farrelly fifth. Newton also lost the match 16–3 though Bennett "headed the forwards" who "worked manfully". The Observer reported later that Bennett had "ricked his knee" and could not give the hooking in the scrum too much attention, the consequence being the City hooker, Duggan, beat Joe badly". Before his injury they said that he "was the pick of the red and white pack. Once he showed a bit of pace when he challenged Opai (Albert Asher) and incidentally got the better of him to the delight of the stand".

At the end of season Newton reunion their president, Mr. C. Gray said that "the success in placing teams regularly in the field was due to the energies of several of the old members, notably Messrs. Bennett, Blakey, Farrant and Fellowes". Mr. R.A. Spinley of the Auckland Rugby League mentioned at the end of year function that "the good work of Joe Bennett (Newton's captain), and Allan Blakey and H. Rowe (ex-players) would be remembered for many a day". Newton finished the season with their annual club match at Otahuhu. Two teams were picked from club players, vice-presidents, and committee and were captained by Bennett and Farrant. Bennett's team won by 15 points to 12.

=== Retirement ===
The 1917 season was to be a short one for Bennett and saw his retirement from the sport. In mid April he was elected on to the Newton Rangers committee at their annual meeting in Alexandra Hall. It is unclear if he played in Newton's first match of the season against Ponsonby on 19 May, but the Observer noted later in the week that "Opai Asher, Joe Bennett, L. [Len] Farrant, [Jim] Griffen, and Stanaway have been seen training". He missed their next three matches but returned for their 20–13 win over North Shore at the Devonport Domain on 16 June. The Observer said that it was "hard to individualise the red and white forwards, as they all played well, Bennett perhaps showing out to the most advantage. We notice by the way that he has not yet got rid of his habit of appealing to the referee for some breach, his arm in the air being very conspicuous at times". Then in their next match against Ponsonby on 30 June he came in for some criticism from the same newspaper who said "everybody seemed to play their best with the exception perhaps, of Bennett (Newton), who was undoubtedly short of a run and at times was a long way behind the play. He played well for the first quarter but after that tired very badly". He was to play no further matches in the season. He did not play again in 1918 nor in 1919.

=== NZRL Life Membership ===
On 4 November 1919, the New Zealand Rugby Football League held a meeting of their executive. A large contingent of applicants for life membership were put forward by the Auckland Rugby League, including Bennett and he, along with 28 others were elected life members. Some of the others elected included Arthur Myers, James Carlaw, Arthur Carlaw, Charles Dunning, Ronald McDonald, Ted Phelan, Albert Asher, Ernie Asher, and Jack Stanaway.

=== Out of retirement and move to Grafton Athletic ===
Somewhat surprisingly Bennett came out of retirement aged 36 and joined the Grafton Athletic club which was led on the field by Karl Ifwersen. Perhaps motivated by his being made a life member of New Zealand rugby league at the end of 1919 along with the pending tour of the England team. He played in their opening game against his old Newton side who won 30–15. The only mention of Bennett was when he kicked the game off in front of a small crowd. Ernie Herring, a Grafton forward had been granted a transfer at the start of the season to the Maritime club which would also have weakened the Grafton forwards. He played again in Grafton's 25–0 loss to Maritime the following week before his third appearance against Marist on 22 May. They lost 15–3 with Bennett crossing the line but "the ball slipping from his hand … spoilt Grafton's chance of a score", though Horace Neal following through forced the ball for their only try. He then played in a match against City before being unavailable for the match with Devonport due to illness. Grafton was forced to default the match as Karl Ifwersen was also sick, Horace Neal injured, and Owen, Moir, and Norton were out of town.

=== Auckland selection ===
In mid June Bennett made a return to the Auckland representative side when he was selected to play at prop against the Rest of New Zealand side. The match was originally scheduled to be played mid week on 22 June but was delayed a day due to bad weather. The Auckland side won easily by 54 points to 0 at the Auckland Domain. The match was played in steady rain and become muddy as the game progressed. Bennett was involved in a passing movement which led to Auckland's second try to Bill Davidson. He threw the last pass to Bill Cloke enabling him to score their fourth try midway through the first half.

Bennett then returned to the Grafton side which registered another loss, 26–0 to Ponsonby. The Auckland Star said that "Bennett, in particular, shone off prominently". Then in their next match against Newton, another defeat by 24 points to 15, he was said to have been "conspicuous" along with Charles Woolley by the Herald. While the Star said that in a "lively" second half "Woolley the back, and Bennett and Collins, the forwards doing best work among the Grafton men". Bennett scored his first points for Grafton in their only win of the season which ironically was against the Maritime side which would go on to win the championship. The scores were tied 5–5 when McSweeney scored for Grafton and Bennett "converted with a fine kick" from the side line. Grafton held on to win 10–5.

Bennett's next match was in an Auckland trial between a A and B team. Bennett scored a try for the A side in the first half which lost 19 to 12. Following the match Bennett missed selection for the Auckland team to play the touring England side. He was not even named amongst the emergency players. The Auckland Star commented that he had "flagged a little".

=== New Zealand selection ===
Two weeks after missing Auckland selection to play the tourists Bennett was named as an emergency player along with Ernie Herring for the first test between New Zealand team to play England. Bennett did play in an Auckland XIII against the North Shore side as a curtain raiser to the test. England won the first test easily by 31 points to 7. Herring ultimately did play in the first test but was replaced by Bennett for the second test. Bennett was also named to play in the North Island side to take on England in Napier midweek. England proved far too good winning the match before a crowd of 4,500 by 46 to 5. The home side did little to speak of but Bennett kicked forward on attack when the North Island trailed 28–2 but it was saved by England fullback, Cyril Stacey.

The second test was played on 7 August at Lancaster Park in Christchurch. Bennett was named in the second row alongside Bert Avery, with Nelson Bass at lock. He was replacing the 22 year old Herring who was moving into the reserves. New Zealand was beaten again 19–3 before a crowd of 5,000. There was no mention of Bennett in the match reports though it was noted that the New Zealand "forwards played with some determination, but their scrum work was not up to their opponents" and they "played relatively better than the New Zealand backs". He was then named in an unchanged forward pack for the third test at the Basin Reserve in Wellington. New Zealand were far more competitive and only lost by 1 point, 11–10 in cold, wet conditions before 4,000 spectators. New Zealand started well and scored two tries to take a 10–3 half time lead. Bennett had a penalty attempt at goal early in the second half but missed. England secured victory at the very end of the match with a converted try on full time.

Following the test Bennett returned to Auckland along with his forward teammates who were all from Auckland. He was to finish his competitive playing career with a final round match against Devonport at the Auckland Domain. Grafton lost 13–5. The Auckland Star reporting after the match that "Bennett and Brady played good games for Grafton in the forward line". He did not play in Grafton's final match of the season which was a 14–3 loss to City in the Roope Rooster first round and he retired from the game.

=== Old timers game ===
In 1931 as part of a charity day planned by Auckland Rugby League for Carlaw Park and old timers match was played. Bennett was chosen for Albert Asher's team to take on Mortinsen's team. Bennett's side featured players such as Ernie Asher, Albert Asher, Jim Rukutai, Bob Mitchell, William Mincham, George Davidson, and Bill Davidson.

== Personal life ==
Joe Bennett was a Wesleyan at the time of his enlistment in the Boer War. In 1905 Bennett married Sarah McInnes Hudson. They had three daughters, Margaret Edna (Joyce), Zoe Aroha (Jones), and Norma Bernice (b. 1914). He was a painter by trade, and in 1916 was living on Grange Road in Mt Eden. He was a reservist during World War 1 due to having 3 children. His wife, Sarah died on 24 October 1919. A death notice was published in the Auckland Star on 25 October stating "BENNETT – On Friday, October 24, at Wiri, Sarah, the loving wife of E.J. (Joe) Bennett, aged 35 years. The funeral will leave her late residence, Wiri, at 2 p.m., Sunday, October 26". ).

Bennett remarried in 1922 to Lilian Edith Heley. They spent the majority of their lives living in South Auckland, with most of it in the suburb of Papatoetoe. In 1922 according to electoral records they were living on Great South Road in Papatoetoe. In 1925 they had moved to Paton Avenue in the same suburb. . In 1928 Bennett's daughter, Zoe was married at St, John's Presbyterian Church in Papatoetoe. She married Stanley Jones, originally from Waiuku. The reception was held at Joe and Lilian's residence on Cornwall Road.

A month after the wedding, on 23 July 1928, their house caught on fire when their fireplace over heated in the evening and a floor joist ignited. Fortunately the fire was discovered quickly and the volunteer fire brigade arrived "within five minutes" and extinguished it before "much damage was done". They remained at Cornwall Road until the late 1930s. Bennett advertised for painters in 1939 to assist him with a job painting a school in Te Awamutu. By 1963 Bennett was listed as retired and living at 276 Shirley Road, Papatoetoe and still living with Lilian.

Bennett died on 9 May 1965, aged 81. He was cremated at Purewa Cemetery and his ashes were scattered.

His wife Lilian died in April 1973. She was living at 25 Shelly Beach Road in Howick and had her ashes scattered.
