= 1913 Auckland Rugby League season =

The 1913 Auckland Rugby League season was the 5th season of the Auckland Rugby league.

The first grade competition began on 3 May with the same 6 teams that had competed in the 1912 season, however Manukau Rovers pulled out of the competition midway through the season as they struggled to put a full team on the field. The Eden Ramblers also pulled out at the same time. North Shore Albions were crowned champions for the first time.

Other clubs competing in lower grades were Otahuhu, Northcote Ramblers now known as the Northcote Tigers, and Ellerslie Wanderers, who later became known as the Ellerslie Eagles. A match was also played between Avondale and New Lynn in Avondale on 13 September. The match was won by New Lynn by 23 points to 8.

| Preceded by 1912 | 5th Auckland Rugby League season 1913 | Succeeded by 1914 |

== News ==
=== Club teams and grade participation ===
| Team | 1st Grade | 2nd Grade | 3rd Grade | 4th Grade | Total |
|---|---|---|---|---|---|
| North Shore Albions | 1 | 1 | 2 | 1 | 5 |
| Ponsonby United | 1 | 1 | 1 | 1 | 4 |
| City Rovers | 1 | 1 | 1 | 1 | 4 |
| Eden Ramblers | 1 | 0 | 2 | 1 | 4 |
| Manukau | 1 | 0 | 2 | 1 | 4 |
| Newton Rangers | 1 | 1 | 0 | 1 | 3 |
| Otahuhu Rovers | 0 | 1 | 1 | 1 | 3 |
| Ellerslie United | 0 | 1 | 1 | 0 | 2 |
| Northcote & Birkenhead Ramblers | 0 | 1 | 0 | 0 | 1 |
| Total | 6 | 7 | 10 | 7 | 30 |

=== Switching codes ===
Karl Ifwersen switched from rugby union where he had been playing in Auckland and made his debut appearance for North Shore Albions. He was to go on to have a remarkable rugby league career and his scoring feats were un-rivalled through the 1910s in Auckland rugby league. While New Zealand representatives Graham Cook and Cecil King had moved from Wellington and made debut appearances for Newton Rangers.

=== Charles Savory controversy ===
In a match involving Ponsonby and Manukau in Onehunga, Charles Savory was accused of kicking an opponent. The incident was not seen by the referee but an Auckland Rugby League official claimed to have seen it and as a result Savory was banned for life by Auckland Rugby League. Savory had been selected to play for New Zealand on their tour of Australia and as a result of the ban was unable to make the trip. When the evidence was presented to New Zealand League they said that the evidence was not sufficient to justify the penalty and refused to confirm it. Auckland Rugby League then decided to strike Savory off the list of registered players thus making him ineligible to play in Auckland. Auckland selector Ronald MacDonald chose Savory to play against Wellington in their match on 23 August but was told at an Auckland Rugby League meeting that he was ineligible and they questioned why he had chosen him to play. MacDonald replied "one reason is because he is one of the best forwards in the Dominion. What was he suspended for?". A lengthy discussion followed and MacDonald refused to withdraw Savory's name from selection and a motion was then passed that MacDonald be removed from his position as Auckland selector. This was carried unanimously with Mr Angus Campbell appointed selector, and Morgan Hayward chosen to replace Savory in the side for the match with Wellington.

=== Death of Adolphus Theodore Bust whilst playing ===
Tragedy struck in May in a 3rd grade match between Ellerslie and Ponsonby when 26-year-old Adolphus Theodore Bust was severely injured and later died as a result of his injuries. The death occurred at the Ellerslie Domain. He was said to have collided with an opposing player and the two of them fell to the ground with a third player falling on top of them. The other two men rose to their feet to carry on playing but Bust remained stationary on the ground. Dr. Baber was called to attend from his residence in Remuera but he found that Bust's spinal cord was fractured near the base of the skull and he recommended he be taken to hospital; however, Bust's father decided to have him taken to his home in Ellerslie. He was unable to be revived and died at 8:30 am the following morning. After the incident the deceased father said he witnessed the incident and was satisfied that it was an accident. Martin Ellis, the player involved in the tackle said that he was running down the field and Bust was waiting to tackle him and had dived and caught Ellis by the legs but his neck struck him on the hip and they both fell to the ground. The coroner returned the verdict that nobody was to blame for the death. None of the Ellerslie teams took the field the following weekend out of respect and the Auckland Rugby League bore the costs of the funeral.

== Myers Cup (first grade competition) ==
Eighteen regular season matches were played before North Shore Albions were awarded the title with a 5 win, 1 draw, 1 loss record.

=== Statistics ===
Including the knockout games there were 21 first grade games played with 103 tries, 50 conversions, 22 penalties, 3 drop goals, and 1 goal from a mark. The average number of points per game was 22, with 4.9 tries per game. With 50 conversions from 103 attempts the successful percentage was 49. These were increases on the previous season where 25.8 points had been scored per game and the conversion percentage was 45.5 versus the current season of 49.

=== Myers Cup standings ===
| Team | Pld | W | D | L | F | A | Pts |
|---|---|---|---|---|---|---|---|
| North Shore Albions | 7 | 5 | 1 | 1 | 80 | 55 | 11 |
| Newton Rangers | 7 | 4 | 0 | 3 | 117 | 53 | 8 |
| City Rovers | 7 | 3 | 2 | 2 | 60 | 46 | 8 |
| Ponsonby United | 7 | 4 | 0 | 3 | 103 | 65 | 8 |
| Eden Ramblers | 5 | 1 | 0 | 4 | 18 | 124 | 2 |
| Manukau Rovers | 5 | 0 | 1 | 4 | 21 | 56 | 1 |

=== Myers Cup fixtures ===
==== Round 1 ====
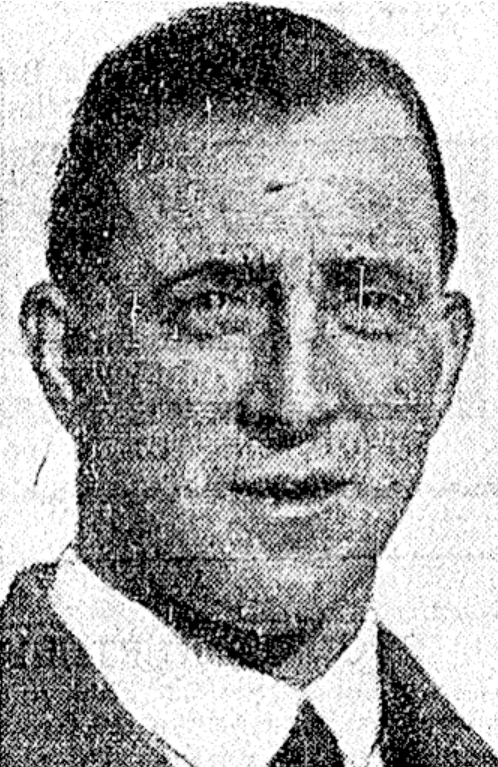
Karl Ifwersen

Karl Ifwersen debuted for North Shore in their 13-0 win over Newton after switching from rugby union. He later became the first ever person to play for the New Zealand rugby league team and then the New Zealand rugby union team. George Cook debuted for Newton Rangers in the same game. He had previously played rugby union in the Horowhenua, Manawatu, and Wellington areas representing all three provinces. He had joined the Athletic club in Wellington in 1912 and played for New Zealand but did not take the field for the club side so this game was his first club game in the code. Jim Clark also made his debut for Ponsonby in their 31-5 win against Eden at Victoria Park and scored a try. He had switched codes from the Ponsonby rugby club. Clark would go on to play 7 matches for Auckland and 12 for New Zealand. Bertram Denyer scored Eden's only try in their loss. After the Eden side dropped out of the competition he joined the Newton Rangers. He enlisted in the war effort and was killed in action at Gallipoli on May 8, 1915. Samuel Houghton played for Ponsonby. He had the unusual accomplishment the following year of playing for England in their tour match against Wellington. The team was injury depleted and rather than play with 12 he was allowed to play for England. He had emigrate to New Zealand with members of his family not long prior and his father, Jack, was one of the England tour managers.

| 3 May | North Shore | 13–10 | Newton | Devonport Domain |
| 3:00 | Try: Richard Ridings, Karl Ifwersen, Stan Walters; Pen: George Seagar, Jim Griffin (mark) | | Try: J Maher, Cecil King; Con: Joe Bennett; Pen: Joe Bennett | Referee: E.R. Harker |

| 3 May | Ponsonby | 31–5 | Eden | Victoria Park |
| 3:00 | Try: Thomas McClymont, Charles Webb, Harry Fricker 3, Arthur Carlaw, Jim Clark; Con: Charles Webb 4, Charles Savory | | Try: Bertram Denyer; Con: Don Kenealy | Referee: Archie Ferguson |

| 3 May | Manukau | 3–3 | City | Onehunga Recreation Reserve |
| 3:00 | Try: Percy Pullen | | Try: Tom Sheehan | Referee: Dick Benson |

==== Round 2 ====
R Clark for Newton scored a remarkable 5 tries either on debut or a week after. He had joined the Newton side from the Ponsonby third grade team of a season prior. Brennan also scored a try from halfback and had come across from the Otahuhu juniors.

| 10 May | Newton | 46–0 | Eden | Auckland Domain |
| 3:00 | Try: George Cook 2, Ike Healey, R Clark 5, Joe Bennett, Cecil King, Brennan, R Roope; Con: George Cook, Adelbert Tobin, R Clark, Joe Bennett, Cecil King | | | Referee: Dick Benson |

| 10 May | North Shore | 9–9 | City | Devonport Domain |
| 3:00 | Try: Jack Paul; Con: Karl Ifwersen; Pen: Karl Ifwersen 2 | | Try: Watene; Con: Albert Asher; Pen: Albert Asher 2 | Referee: Knox |

| 10 May | Manukau | 3–20 | Ponsonby | Onehunga Recreation Reserve |
| 3:00 | Try: unknown x 1 | | Try: unknown x 6 Con: unknown x 1 | Referee: Tom Fielding |

==== Round 3 ====
For Eden Don Kenealy did not take the field as the result of "some little disagreement". It meant that the team was somewhat depleted and a decision was made to play two short spells. They ended up being soundly beaten 19-0 and would soon exit the competition for good.

| 17 May | City | 6–5 | Ponsonby | Victoria Park |
| 3:00 | Try: Albert Asher, Watene | | Try: Irvine; Pen: Charles Savory | Attendance: 1000; Referee: Archie Ferguson |

| 17 May | North Shore | 19–0 | Eden | Auckland Domain |
| 3:00 | Try: Stan Weston 2, Jim Griffin, Tom Haddon 2 Con: Jim Griffen 2 | | | Referee: Billy Murray |

| 17 May | Manukau | 5–22 | Newton | Onehunga Recreation Reserve |
| 3:00 | Try: unknown x 1 Con: unknown x 1 | | Try: unknown x 6 Con: unknown x 2 | Referee: E R Harker |

==== Round 4 ====
In the Ponsonby match with North Shore Harry Fricker was ordered off for striking at Alfred Jackson. The act was missed by the referee but seen by the line umpire. The match between Manukau and Eden was reported as a win to Manukau and a win to Eden in differing reports.

| 24 May | City | 5–0 | Newton | Victoria Park |
| 3:00 | Try: Albert Asher; Pen: Albert Asher | | | Attendance: 3000; Referee: Archie Ferguson |

| 24 May | North Shore | 17–7 | Ponsonby | Devonport Domain |
| 3:00 | Try: Stan Weston 2, Karl Ifwersen 2, Stan Walters; Con: E Rogers | | Try: unknown x 1 Con: unknown x 1 Pen: Charles Savory | Attendance: 1500; Referee: Dick Benson |

| 24 May | Manukau | 10–11 | Eden | Onehunga Recreation Reserve |
| 3:00 | Try: unknown x 2 Con: unknown x 2 | | Try: unknown x 3 Con: unknown x 1 | Referee: F Tyson |

==== Round 5 ====
Manukau defaulted their match to North Shore Albions. The later arrived in Onehunga to find that their opponents could not muster a team with only Arthur Hardgrave and "three or four others" turning up. Jim Rukutai and other prominent players were said to be suffering from influenza. This was to be Manukau's last game in the senior grade for decades as they forfeited the following week along with Eden and dropped out of the senior competition. Rukutai was diagnosed with smallpox and was put into isolation in a Point Chevalier hospital. However it was soon after realised that he was actually suffering from a severe case of chicken pox and he made a full recovery soon after. Eden were to cease playing as a club a few seasons later and never returned. The New Zealand side was on tour in Australia so several sides were missing their international players. Frank McWhirter debuted for Ponsonby after having played for their 3rd grade side immediately prior. Charles Webb scored all Ponsonby's points through 2 goals from marks, a penalty, and a drop goal. George Cook's try for Newton provoked a huge response from the crowd after he raced away and leaped over the top of Ponsonby fullback, Montgomery to score under the posts.

| 31 May | Ponsonby | 8–5 | Newton | Victoria Park 2 |
| 3:00 | Pen: Charles Webb 3 (2 marks); Drop: Charles Webb | | Try: George Cook; Con: Len Farrant | Attendance: 3,000; Referee: E R Harker |

| 31 May | City | 18–2 | Eden | Auckland Domain |
| 3:00 | Try: unknown x 4 Con: unknown x 3 | | Pen: unknown x 1 | Referee: Tom Fielding |

| 31 May | Manukau | LBD-WBD | North Shore | Onehunga Recreation Reserve |
| 3:00 |

==== Round 6 ====
A somewhat unusual event occurred in the match between Ponsonby and North Shore when it was briefly suspended after a player from North Shore dropped his false teeth. He was inevitably subjected to some “good-natured banter from the crowd”. It was complained that the match at Victoria Park was kicked off at 3:30 and concluded in near darkness while it should also have been played in front of the stand as there were between 4 and 5 thousand spectators crammed around the sideline with the game needing to be stopped at times due to them encroaching on the field. The excuse by the authorities was that league damages the main field more than other sports.

| 7 June | Ponsonby | 22–12 | North Shore | Victoria Park |
| 3:00 | Try: Hayward, Williams, Charles Webb, Harrison; Con: Charles Webb 2 Pen: Charles Webb; Drop: Charles Webb 2 | | Try: Ernie Bailey, E Rogers; Con: George Seagar 2 Pen: George Seagar | Attendance: 4,000; Referee: Knox |

| 7 June | Newton | 17–12 | City | Auckland Domain |
| 3:00 | Try: R Clark, Joe Bennett, George Cook 3 Con: Adelbert Tobin | | Try: T Ormsby, Phillips; Con: Ernie Asher 2 Pen: Ernie Asher | Referee: Archie Ferguson |

| 7 June | Manukau | Double Forfeit | Eden |
| 3:00 |

==== Round 7 ====
With Manukau and Eden both disbanding their senior teams Pullen from Manukau transferred to North Shore and played for them, Arthur Hardgrave also transferred to the North Shore but did not take the field, while Don Kenealy of Eden transferred and played for City. William Wynyard turned out to assist the North Shore side for the first time in the season with his brother Hec playing on the wing, while Sheen debuted for them having come across from the Marist rugby side. Victor Alexander McCollum scored a try for Ponsonby. He had previously played rugby for the South Auckland (Waikato) side and was from the Karangahake area. He was killed at the Somme, on September 26, 1916 aged 25.

| 14 June | Newton | 17–10 | Ponsonby | Victoria Park |
| 3:00 | Try: Adelbert Tobin, R Clark, Ike Healey; Con: George Cook 2 Pen: George Cook 2 | | Try: Charles Dunning, Victor McCollum; Con: Charles Webb 2 | Attendance: 5,000; Referee: Archie Ferguson |

| 14 June | North Shore | 10–7 | City | Devonport Domain |
| 3:00 | Try: Sheen, William Wynyard; Con: George Seagar 2 | | Try: T Ormsby; Con: Ernie Asher; Pen: Ernie Asher | Attendance: 2000; Referee: E.R. Harker |

=== Knockout competition ===
After North Shore had won the championship the league decided to play a knockout competition between the four remaining teams. Newton and City both won their matches and progressed to the final. Cross was on debut for Ponsonby and had played in their second grade game an hour earlier.

==== Round 1 ====
| 21 June | Newton | 17–0 | North Shore | Auckland Domain |
| 3:00 | Try: R Clark 3, Ike Healey, George Cook; Con: Joe Bennett | | | Attendance: 3,000; Referee: T. Fielding |

| 21 June | City | 14–7 | Ponsonby | Victoria Park |
| 3:00 | Try: Dunkley, Watene; Con: Ernie Asher; Pen: Ernie Asher 3 | | Try: Victor McCollum; Pen: Charles Webb, Cross | Attendance: 3,500; Referee: Billy Murray |

==== Knockout final ====
City were joined by Jim Rukutai for the match following Manukau's senior team disbanding. It was his first game back after recovering from a very serious bout of chicken pox.

| 5 July | City | 25–5 | Newton | Victoria Park |
| 3:00 | Try: Harold Denize, Don Kenealy 2, Robinson, Watene; Con: Ernie Asher 4 Pen: Ernie Asher | | Try: Bowen; Con: George Cook | Attendance: 3,000; Referee: Knox |

=== Top try and point scorers ===
Scoring included both the first grade championship and the knockout matches. A large number of matches did not have the scorers named meaning the following lists are incomplete. Points missing are as follows: Newton Rangers (22), City Rovers (18), Ponsonby United (25), Eden Ramblers (15), and Manukau Rovers (18).

Top point scorers
| No | Player | Team | Games | T | C | P | DG | Pts |
|---|---|---|---|---|---|---|---|---|
| 1 | Charles Webb | Ponsonby | 8 | 2 | 8 | 5 | 3 | 38 |
| 2 | George Cook | Newton | 9 | 7 | 4 | 2 | 0 | 33 |
| 3 | R Clark | Newton | 8 | 10 | 1 | 0 | 0 | 32 |
| 4 | Ernie Asher | City | 8 | 0 | 8 | 6 | 0 | 28 |
| 5 | Karl Ifwersen | North Shore | 4 | 3 | 1 | 2 | 0 | 15 |

Top try scorers
| No | Player | Team | Games | Tries |
|---|---|---|---|---|
| 1 | R Clark | Newton | 8 | 10 |
| 2 | George Cook | Newton | 9 | 7 |
| 3 | Watene | City | 8 | 4 |
| 3 | Stan Weston | North Shore | 7 | 4 |
| 5 | Harry Fricker | Ponsonby | 7 | 3 |
| 5 | Ike Healey | Newton | 9 | 3 |
| 5 | Karl Ifwersen | North Shore | 4 | 3 |

== Exhibition Match ==
=== Hamilton v City Rovers ===
On July 19 City Rovers traveled to Hamilton to play the local side.

| 19 July | Hamilton | 21–10 | City Rovers | Hamilton |
| 3:00 | Try: Potier, Agnew; Pen: Potier | | Try: Rogers, Ernie Asher 2, Phillips, George Cook; Con: Ernie Asher 3 |

=== Avondale v New Lynn ===
On September 13 Avondale played New Lynn in their "annual football match". Several of the players including Bertram and John Denyer, Emmet Kenealy, Bond, and Bob Biggs had played for the recently folded Eden Ramblers who were based in the Avondale/Point Chevalier area.

| 13 September | Avondale | 8–23 | New Lynn | Avondale |
| 3:00 | Try: Atkinson, McSweeney; Con: Emmet Kenealy | | Try: Bertram Denyer 2, L Yearbury, Bond, John Denyer, Bob Biggs (+ 1 unknown); Con: J Allen | Referee: F. Postlewaight |

== Thacker Shield ==
On 7 September North Shore Albions journeyed to Christchurch to play against Sydenham to play for the Thacker Shield. At the start of the season Dr. Thacker, president of the Canterbury league had presented the shield for competition amongst the senior clubs of Christchurch but he had stipulated that it was open to competition to any club in New Zealand. When North Shore won the Auckland championship they immediately issued a challenge to Sydenham. North Shore sent a strong team south but were without Karl Ifwersen and Stan Walters who were representing New Zealand against the touring New South Wales side.

| 7 September | Sydenham | 13–8 | North Shore Albions | Christchurch Showgrounds |
| 3:00 | Try: T Kirton, W Smythe 2 Con: J Smith 2 | | Try: Percy Pullen, A Rogers; Con: George Seagar | Referee: A Hooper |

== Lower grades ==
The draws were always reported in the New Zealand Herald and the Auckland Star however only some of the results were reported in the Monday editions. As a result, the tables are incomplete and are compiled of known results.

=== Second grade standings ===
Ponsonby won the championship undefeated for the second year though Otahuhu did manage to draw with them 5-5 on June 7. Ponsonby defeated Otahuhu 22-9 in the final on July 19. The Ellerslie side withdrew from the competition following the death of 3rd grade player Adolphus Bust. He was seriously injured during a match in May and died later in the evening.

| Team | Pld | W | D | L | B | F | A | Pts |
|---|---|---|---|---|---|---|---|---|
| Ponsonby United | 9 | 8 | 1 | 0 | 1 | 44 | 18 | 17 |
| Otahuhu Rovers | 9 | 7 | 1 | 1 | 1 | 76 | 37 | 15 |
| Newton Rangers | 7 | 3 | 0 | 4 | 0 | 52 | 40 | 6 |
| Northcote & Birkenhead Ramblers | 7 | 2 | 0 | 5 | 0 | 40 | 41 | 4 |
| City Rovers | 7 | 2 | 0 | 5 | 0 | 28 | 60 | 4 |
| North Shore Albions | 7 | 1 | 0 | 6 | 1 | 32 | 73 | 2 |
| Ellerslie United | 1 | 0 | 0 | 1 | 1 | 0 | 3 | 0 |

=== Third grade standings ===
Ponsonby won the championship after defeating City Rovers 16-5 in the final on August 9. For Ponsonby R. Neil scored a try, kicked a conversion and kicked a drop goal, while Coulan and Adams also scored tries. City's points came from a try to James which he also converted. The Ellerslie side withdrew from the competition following the death of 3rd grade player Adolphus Bust who was seriously injured during a match in May, dying later that evening.

| Team | Pld | W | D | L | B | F | A | Pts |
|---|---|---|---|---|---|---|---|---|
| Ponsonby United | 9 | 6 | 1 | 2 | 0 | 88 | 34 | 13 |
| City Rovers | 6 | 3 | 0 | 3 | 1 | 52 | 46 | 6 |
| North Shore Albions B | 3 | 3 | 0 | 0 | 0 | 33 | 12 | 6 |
| Manukau B | 3 | 2 | 1 | 0 | 1 | 29 | 28 | 4 |
| Otahuhu Rovers | 5 | 2 | 0 | 3 | 0 | 28 | 43 | 4 |
| Manukau A | 2 | 1 | 0 | 1 | 0 | 13 | 19 | 2 |
| Eden Ramblers A | 4 | 1 | 1 | 2 | 0 | 30 | 34 | 3 |
| Ellerslie United | 2 | 1 | 0 | 1 | 0 | 14 | 21 | 2 |
| Eden Ramblers B | 4 | 0 | 0 | 4 | 0 | 20 | 44 | 0 |
| North Shore Albions A | 2 | 0 | 0 | 2 | 1 | 2 | 28 | 0 |

=== Fourth grade standings ===
Otahuhu defeated Ponsonby in the championship final on July 19 though no score was reported.

| Team | Pld | W | D | L | B | F | A | Pts |
|---|---|---|---|---|---|---|---|---|
| Otahuhu Rovers | 6 | 6 | 0 | 0 | 0 | 42 | 9 | 12 |
| Ponsonby United | 7 | 5 | 0 | 2 | 1 | 31 | 8 | 10 |
| City Rovers | 5 | 3 | 0 | 2 | 2 | 42 | 25 | 6 |
| Eden Ramblers | 3 | 1 | 0 | 2 | 1 | 11 | 38 | 2 |
| North Shore Albions | 4 | 0 | 0 | 4 | 2 | 10 | 30 | 0 |
| Newton Rangers | 2 | 0 | 0 | 2 | 0 | 2 | 21 | 0 |
| Manukau | 3 | 0 | 0 | 3 | 2 | 3 | 10 | 0 |

== Representative season ==
1913 was a very busy year for the Auckland representative team as they played 10 matches recording a 7 win, 3 loss record. Their three defeats were against the touring New South Wales team and then on a two match end of season tour to Taranaki and Wellington. Angus Campbell was their selector for the season.

The first representative fixture of the season was played on 28 June against a Country selection at Victoria Park, Auckland. Three thousand spectators attended and 117 pounds was collected. Further matches were played against Taranaki, Hawke's Bay, Nelson, Canterbury, Wellington, and New South Wales. Auckland also played an exhibition match in Pukekohe against the Auckland club champions North Shore Albions.

On August 9 Auckland Juniors beat Waikato Juniors 33-5 in Huntly.

=== Representative matches ===
==== Auckland v NZ Country Combined ====
| 28 June | Auckland | 10–8 | NZ Country Combined | Victoria Park |
| 3:00 | Try: George Cook, Jim Griffin; Con: George Seagar; Pen: George Seagar | | Pen: Dufty 4 | Attendance: 3,000; Referee: E.R. Harker |

==== Auckland v Taranaki (Northern Union C.C.) ====
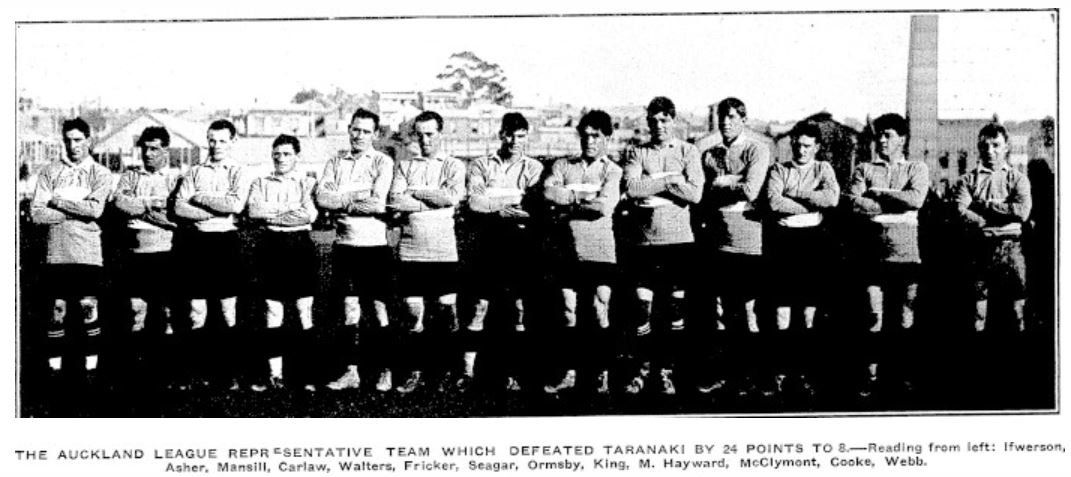

| 1 July | Auckland | 24–8 | Taranaki | Victoria Park |
| 3:00 | Try: George Cook, Charles Webb 2, Arthur Carlaw, Karl Ifwersen 2 Con: Charles Webb 3 | | Try: Taylor 2 Pen: Gordon Hooker (mark) | Attendance: 5,000; Referee: Archie Ferguson |

==== Auckland V Hawke's Bay (Northern Union C.C.) ====
George Seagar was not named in the original side to play but replaced Cecil King prior to kick off in the front row.

| 26 July | Auckland | 34–7 | Hawke’s Bay | Victoria Park |
| 3:00 | Try: Karl Ifwersen 4, Albert Asher, Harold Hayward, Stan Walters, Bob Mitchell; Con: Charles Webb, Karl Ifwersen 2 | | Try: Jim Johnson; Con: A Morrison; Pen: W Smith (mark) | Attendance: 5,500; Referee: Dick Benson |

==== Auckland V Nelson (Northern Union C.C.) ====
The match was refereed by George Frater who was from the Hawkes Bay referees association. He was on holiday from Hawkes Bay after their side toured the previous weekend. He was an ex-captain of Oldham in England. A trial match was played as curtain-raiser between A and B teams resulting in a win to the former by 11 points to 3.

| 2 August | Auckland | 16–2 | Nelson | Victoria Park |
| 3:00 | Try: Alan Blakey, Karl Ifwersen 2, Albert Asher; Con: Charles Webb 2 | | Pen: Taylor | Attendance: 2,500; Referee: George Frater |

==== Auckland v Canterbury (Northern Union C.C.) ====
| 9 August | Auckland | 48–12 | Canterbury | Victoria Park |
| 3:00 | Try: Stan Weston 3, Harold Hayward 3, Bob Mitchell 2, George Cook 2, Frank Woodward, Karl Ifwersen; Con: Charles Webb 4, Karl Ifwersen, Stan Walters | | Try: A. Stokes, C.B. Hardingham; Con: H.J. Shanks; Pen: H.J. Shanks 2 | Attendance: 6,000; Referee: E.R. Harker |

==== Auckland v North Shore Albions (exhibition match) ====
| 16 August | Auckland | 14–13 | North Shore Albions | Pukekohe |
| 3:00 | Try: Thomas McClymont, Alan Blakey, Jim Clark, Harry Fricker; Con: Charles Webb | | Try: Stan Walters, Karl Ifwersen 2 Con: Karl Ifwersen, Jim Griffin | Attendance: 400; Referee: Leonard Nield |

==== Auckland v Wellington (Northern Union C.C.) ====
| 23 August | Auckland | 12–11 | Wellington | Victoria Park |
| 3:00 | Try: Karl Ifwersen, Stan Weston; Con: Charles Webb; Pen: Karl Ifwersen; Drop: Karl Ifwersen | | Try: James Barber 2, Charles Finlayson; Con: George Bradley | Attendance: 7,500; Referee: Archie Ferguson |

==== Auckland B v North Shore Albions ====
The match was played as a curtain raiser to Auckland v New South Wales.

| 30 August | Auckland B | 5-5 | North Shore Albions | Auckland Domain |
| 1:30 | Try: Joe Bennett; Con: Ernie Asher | | Try: Leslie (Hec) Wynyard; Pen: Jim Griffen | Attendance: 15,000; Referee: Billy Murray |

==== Auckland v New South Wales ====
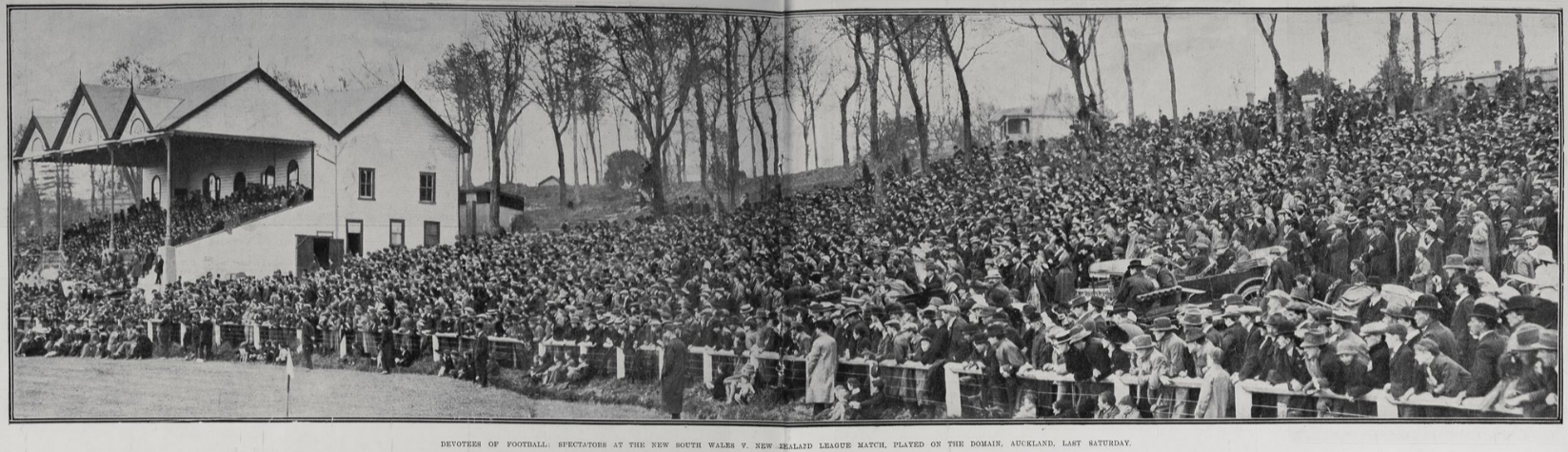
The crowd at the Auckland Domain for the Auckland v NSW game.

William Tobin went on for the injured Alan Blakey and George Seagar replaced Harold Hayward who was also injured. Both players had played in the curtain raiser for Auckland B and North Shore Albions respectively. The match was attended by Auckland Mayor, James Parr who complained after the match about the large number of spectators who crowded on to the field during the game and threatened that is the rugby league authorities could not guarantee they would be prevented from the field for the following weeks test match then he would ban them from playing the match on the Auckland Domain.

| 30 August | Auckland | 2–27 | New South Wales | Auckland Domain |
| 3:00 | Pen: Karl Ifwersen | | Try: Les Cubitt, Dan Frawley 2, Sid Deane 2, Con Sullivan, Billy Cann; Con: Dan Frawley, Howard Hallett 2 | Attendance: 15,000; Referee: S Benson |

==== Auckland v Taranaki ====
Thomas McClymont injured his arm late in the first half and went off but came back on. Then early in the second half he retired permanently meaning Auckland only had 12 players. Bob Mitchell and Stan Walters joined the team in New Plymouth having left Wellington after the New Zealand match there. Karl Ifwersen was supposed to also join but he had been injured in New Zealand's match so went directly back to Auckland. George Seagar who had gone on tour was refereeing at late notice as Taranaki had been unable to organise a suitable referee. The Taranaki forwards were said to have dominated the match and while the Auckland backs played brilliantly they failed to finish many chances.

| 25 September | Taranaki | 21-11 | Auckland | Taranaki Sports Ground |
| 3:00 | Try: O Tocker, Lance Moir, Rich, Martis, N Kyle; Con: Gordon Hooker; Pen: Gordon Hooker 2 | | Try: George Cook, Adelbert Tobin, Stan Walters; Con: Charles Webb | Attendance: 300; Referee: George Seagar |

==== Auckland v Wellington ====
A player named 'Murdoch' appeared for Auckland and this is likely to have been the treasurer/manager of the Auckland side Adam Murdoch. There were no team lists in any of the newspapers and only 12 players were mentioned by name in the match reports. When Murdoch died in September 1944 the Auckland Rugby League sent their condolences to his family. Those were Mansell, Cook, Woodward, Kenealy, Tobin, Seagar, Webb, Murdoch, Mitchell, Walters, Rukutai, and Denize. The other one who may have played is Clark, Manning, or Fricker who had all been with the touring side in Taranaki.

| 27 September | Wellington | 33-18 | Auckland | Newtown Park, Wellington |
| 3:00 | Try: B Whitley, Bill Kelly 2, George Bradley 2, Albert House, John Spencer; Con: Paddy George 4, Les Campbell 2 | | Try: George Cook, George Seagar, Adam Murdoch, Bob Mitchell; Con: Charles Webb 3 | Attendance: 1,800; Referee: Charlie Murphy |

=== Auckland representative matches played and scorers ===
| Rank | Name | Club | Played | Tries | Con | Pen | Mark | Points |
|---|---|---|---|---|---|---|---|---|
| 1 | Charles Webb | Ponsonby United | 10 | 2 | 18 | - | - | 42 |
| 1 | Karl Ifwersen | North Shore Albions | 6 | 10 | 3 | 2 | 1 | 42 |
| 3 | George Cook | Newton Rangers | 8 | 6 | - | - | - | 18 |
| 4 | Bob Mitchell | City Rovers | 8 | 4 | - | - | - | 12 |
| 4 | Stan Weston | North Shore Albions | 5 | 4 | - | - | - | 12 |
| 4 | Harold Hayward | Thames | 5 | 4 | - | - | - | 12 |
| 7 | Stan Walters | North Shore Albions | 8 | 2 | 1 | - | - | 8 |
| 8 | George Seagar | North Shore Albions | 6 | 1 | 1 | 1 | - | 7 |
| 9 | Alan Blakey | Newton Rangers | 5 | 2 | - | - | - | 6 |
| 9 | Albert Asher | City Rovers | 4 | 2 | - | - | - | 6 |
| 11 | Harry Fricker | Ponsonby United | 9 | 1 | - | - | - | 3 |
| 11 | Adelbert (Dick) Tobin | Newton Rangers | 6 | 1 | - | - | - | 3 |
| 11 | Frank Woodward | Waikato | 5 | 1 | - | - | - | 3 |
| 11 | Arthur Carlaw | Ponsonby United | 3 | 1 | - | - | - | 3 |
| 11 | Thomas McClymont | Ponsonby United | 3 | 1 | - | - | - | 3 |
| 11 | Jim Griffin | North Shore Albions | 1 | 1 | - | - | - | 3 |
| 11 | Jim Clark | Ponsonby United | 2 | 1 | - | - | - | 3 |
| 18 | Frederick W Mansell | City Rovers | 10 | - | - | - | - | 0 |
| 18 | Morgan Hayward | Thames | 5 | - | - | - | - | 0 |
| 18 | Manning | Ponsonby United | 2 | - | - | - | - | 0 |
| 18 | Percy Williams | Ponsonby United | 2 | - | - | - | - | 0 |
| 18 | Harold (Ray) Denize | City Rovers | 3 | - | - | - | - | 0 |
| 18 | Cecil King | Newton Rangers | 1 | - | - | - | - | 0 |
| 18 | Rukingi Reke | Rotorua | 2 | - | - | - | - | 0 |
| 18 | Jim Rukutai | City Rovers | 2 | - | - | - | - | 0 |
| 18 | T Ormsby | City Rovers | 1 | - | - | - | - | 0 |
| 18 | Dick Bradburn | Newton Rangers | 1 | - | - | - | - | 0 |
| 18 | Tom Avery | City Rovers | 1 | - | - | - | - | 0 |
| 18 | Charles Brockliss | Newton Rangers | 1 | - | - | - | - | 0 |
| 18 | Don Kenealy | City Rovers | 1 | - | - | - | - | 0 |
| 18 | Adam Murdoch | Ponsonby United* | 1 | - | - | - | - | 0 |

- Adam Murdoch was a member of the Ponsonby United club but non-playing. Was on tour as manager for the Taranaki and Wellington games.
