= Don Kenealy =

New Zealand international rugby league footballer

Donald Kenealy
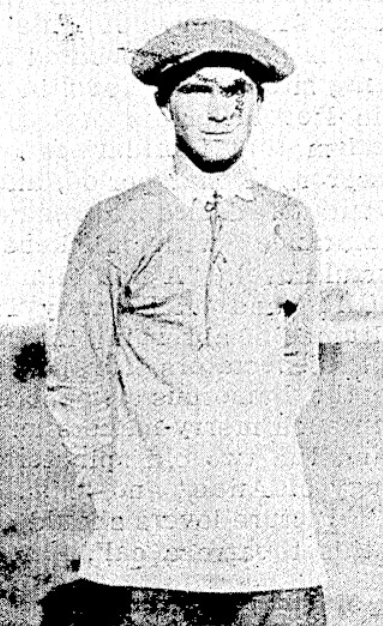

Personal information
- Full name: Daniel James Kenealy
- Born: 13 February 1893 Te Puke, New Zealand
- Died: 12 August 1976 (aged 83)

Playing information
- Height: 5 ft 1.5 in (1.562 m)
- Weight: 144 lb (65 kg)
- Position: Wing
Club
Years	Team	Pld	T	G	FG	P
1911–13	Eden Ramblers	14	4	11	0	34
1913–15	City Rovers	17	2	1	0	8
	Total	31	6	12	0	42
Representative
Years	Team	Pld	T	G	FG	P
1911–13	Auckland	8	1	0	0	3
1912	New Zealand	4	0	0	0	0

Don Kenealy was a New Zealand rugby league player who represented New Zealand.

== Early life ==
He was known as Daniel James Kenealy but went by Don or Donald throughout life. On occasion his war records say Donald and at other times Daniel. He grew up in the Te Puke area where he attended Te Puke Primary School. He later moved to Auckland and went to Sacred Heart College where he excelled as a cricketer and rugby footballer. He left school in 1909 and in 1910 was playing rugby for Marist Brothers second grade team.

== Playing career ==
The Auckland side with Kenealy for the September 2, 1911 game at Victoria Park. Auckland won 26-15.

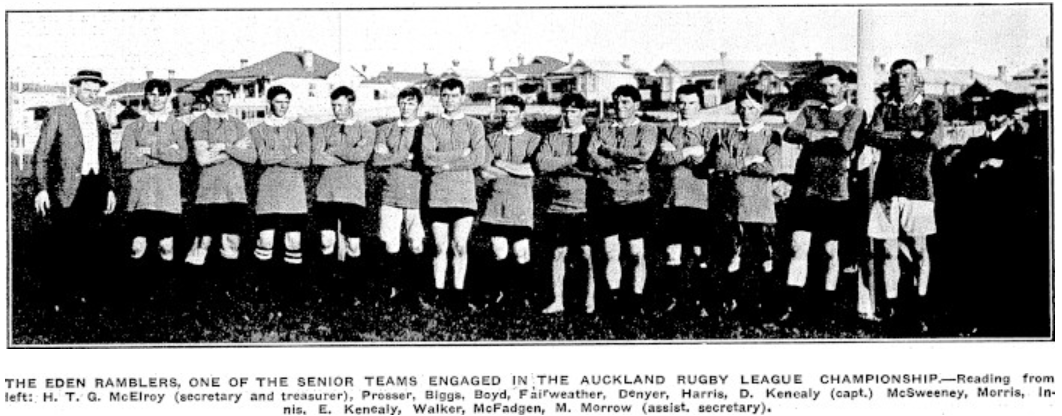
Kenealy in the Eden Ramblers side on 11 May 1912. He is 8th from the left.

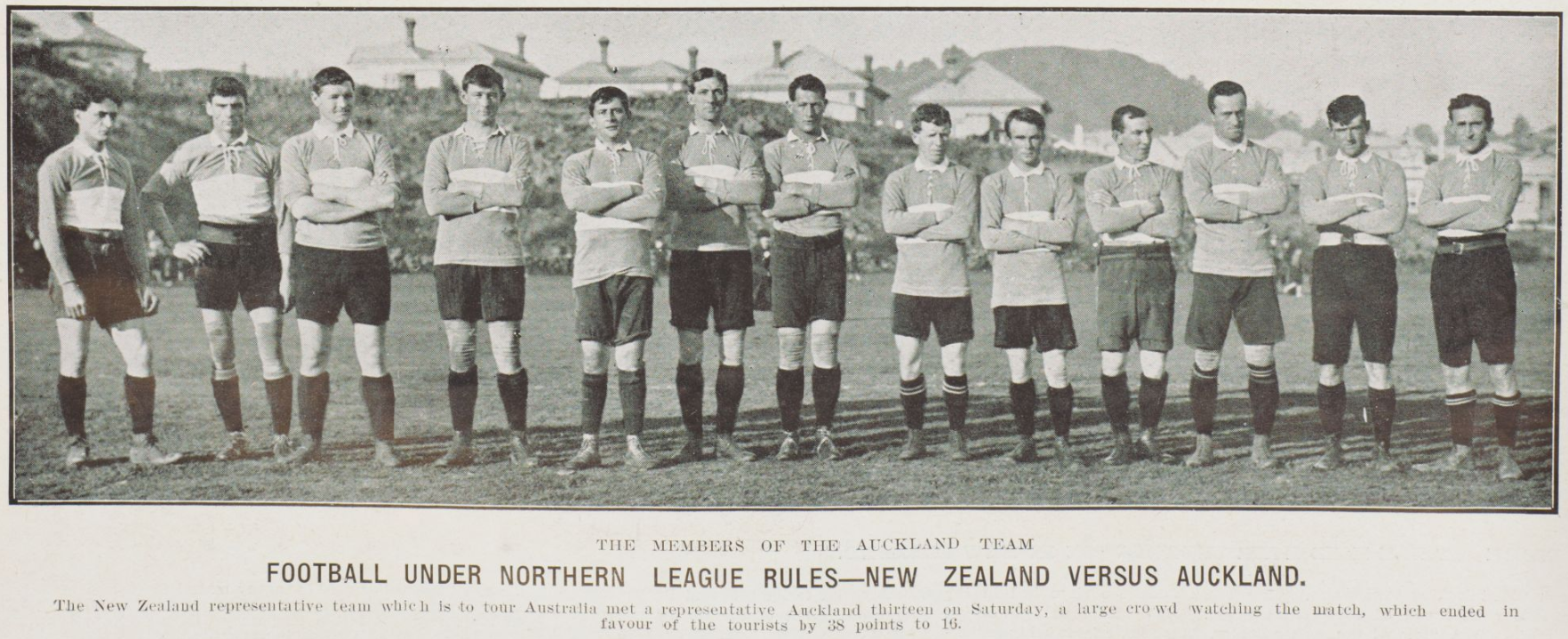
Kenealy in the 1912 Auckland rugby league side to play New Zealand at Eden Park.

Kenealy switched to rugby league in 1911 and played for Eden Ramblers from their foundation in 1911 to 1913. He was a back and captained the side in 1913. During the 1913 season the Eden senior team disbanded and Kenealy was granted a transfer by Auckland Rugby League to the City Rovers

. He was selected for the Auckland in 1911 and played 3 matches for them. In 1912 he played 4 matches for Auckland and scored 1 try.

In 1912 he was selected to play for New Zealand on the tour of Australia. No test matches were played on the tour. Following the 1915 season he stopped playing. He was a carpenter and lived at Belvedere, New North Road in Mount Albert after marrying.

== War ==
Donald Kenealy served in World War I. At the time of his enlistment he was living in Mount Albert and was working at Brooke Bros. in the same suburb.

== Personal life ==
In 1917 he married Dorothy Harrison Hills in Christchurch. They lived together soon after in Mount Albert in Auckland however. He was a carpenter by trade according to his war recruitment form.
