= George Cook (rugby, born 1889) =

NZ international rugby league & union player (1889-1918)

Personal information
- Full name: George Gray Cook
- Born: 6 August 1889 Otaki, New Zealand
- Died: 12 October 1918 (aged 29) France

Playing information
- Height: 172.7 cm (5 ft 8.0 in)
- Weight: 76.2 kg (12 st 0 lb)

Rugby union
- Position: Winger, Centre
Club
Years	Team	Pld	T	G	FG	P
1907–10	Kia Toa		2			6
1911–12	St James (Well.)	26	6	2	0	23
	Total	26	8	2	0	29
Representative
Years	Team	Pld	T	G	FG	P
1907–10	Horowhenua	18	5	0	0	15
1908	Otaki (sub-union)	1	2	0	0	6
1910	Manawatu-Horowhenua	3	1	0	0	3
1911	Wellington	4	4	0	0	12

Rugby league
- Position: Wing, Centre
Club
Years	Team	Pld	T	G	FG	P
1912	Athletic	0	0	0	0	0
1913	Newton Rangers	9	7	6	0	33
1914	Otahuhu United	8	7	4	0	29
	Total	17	14	10	0	62
Representative
Years	Team	Pld	T	G	FG	P
1912–1913	Wellington	5	2	2	0	10
1912–13	New Zealand	2	0	0	0	0
1913	Auckland	8	6	0	0	18
- As of 19 January 2021

George Gray Cook was a rugby union and rugby league player. Cook played for Horowhenua at rugby union, before moving to Wellington and playing for Wellington before switching codes. He played 2 matches for the New Zealand rugby league team in 1912–13. In so doing he became the 86th player to represent New Zealand at rugby league. He also played rugby league for Wellington, before moving to Auckland and playing for Newton Rangers, Otahuhu and Auckland. He enlisted in the army for World War I and died in France in 1918.

== Playing career ==
=== Rugby union in Horowhenua ===
George Cook first began playing rugby union at a senior level around 1907. He was playing for the Kia Toa club and represented Horowhenua in 4 matches against Manawatu, Foxton, Hawke's Bay, and Wellington B. In 1908 he played for Otaki in a match against Levin and scored 2 tries. It was said at the time that he was a player with tremendous pace. He made 3 more appearances for Horowhenua against Hawke's Bay, Wellington B, and Wanganui respectively. In 1909 he played 5 matches for them against Awarua, Palmerston, Manawatu, Wellington, and Wellington B. He scored a try in the match with Manawatu and another against Wellington B.

1910 was Cook's busiest representative season for Horowhenua. He played in a match against Manawatu on July 9 and scored a try. Cook then played for the combined Manawatu-Horowhenua team against New Zealand Māori which they lost 15–6, and Wellington. Later in the season he also played for the same side against Wellington B and scored a try. He played in 5 further matches for the Horowhenua team against Foxton, Manawatu, Foxton again, Hawke's Bay, and finally Manawatu for a second time.

=== Move to Wellington ===
In 1911 Cook made a move to Wellington where he joined the St James club. He played 14 games for them during the 1911 season. His form was good enough to gain selection for Wellington in their match with Marlborough on June 22 where he scored 2 tries. He made a further representative appearances for Wellington against North Island Country on 9 August at Athletic Park. He then played against New Zealand Māori on August 12 where he scored a long range try after "Cook dashed in, and gathering the oval, was in an instant making full speed ahead for the goal line. In the exciting race of between eighty and ninety yards, Cook was chased by Autini Kaipara, from whom he gained stride by stride, foot by foot, and finally shook off a beaten pursuer. Then Poananga chimed in, but the St James three-quarter never faltered a moment, and finally scored a brilliant try near the corner". Wellington went on the win the match 26–5 in front of 1,500 at Athletic Park. His last appearance was against Taranaki where he scored another try.

In 1912 he made 12 further appearances for the St James club, scoring 4 tries and kicking a penalty.

=== Switch to rugby league and Wellington debut ===
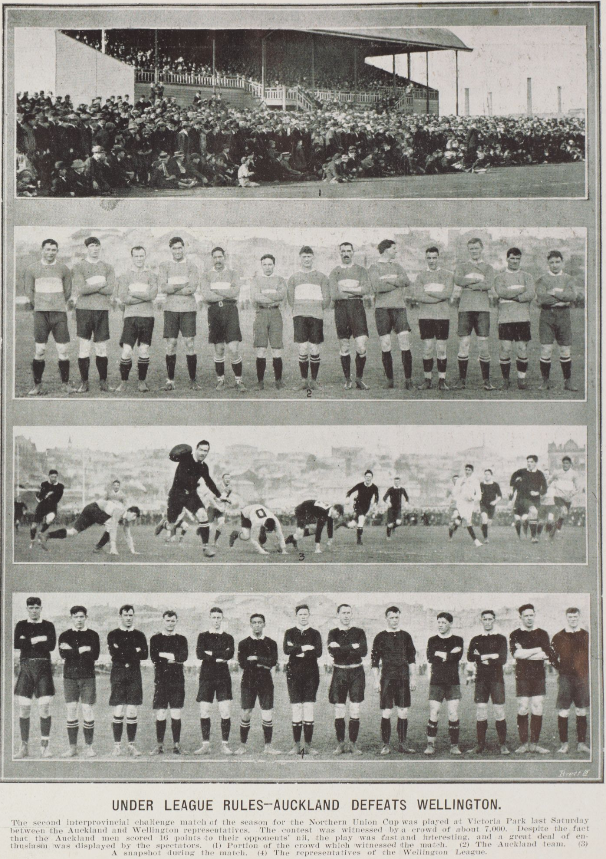
Cook in the Wellington team to play Auckland at Victoria Park in August of 1912.

In mid August, Cook made the move to the rugby league code. He joined the Athletic club though he did not play any matches for them as the club season was finished. On August 10 he played for the Wellington side against Auckland. The match was played at Victoria Park in Auckland before a crowd of 5,500. Auckland won the match 16–0. He then played against Rotorua on August 14 and scored a try and kicked 2 conversions in a 24–10 win. Wellington then played the touring New South Wales side where he scored another try. He then played in the Wellington side which drew 14 all with Wanganui at Cooks Gardens.

=== New Zealand selection ===
His form for Wellington was good enough to gain selection for the New Zealand side to play the same opponents. He played in the three-quarters alongside Rukingi Reke and Bill Kelly. He was involved in a couple of near try scoring opportunities but New Zealand ultimately lost 18–10 in front of 20,000 spectators at the Auckland Domain.

=== Move to Auckland and Newton Rangers ===
It was reported that Cook was to join the Ponsonby United side however he eventually ended up playing for Newton Rangers in the Auckland Rugby League competition. He played 9 matches for Newton and scored 7 tries and kicked 6 goals making hm the 2nd highest try scored and 2nd highest point scorer in the 1913 Auckland Rugby League season. He was selected for the Auckland side to play against Waikato Country on June 28 and scored a try in a 10–8 win. He scored again in a 24–8 win over Taranaki. He played against Hawke's Bay on July 26 in a 36–7 win at Victoria Park before another win over Canterbury. Auckland won 48-12 before 6,000 spectators at Victoria Park with Cook scoring twice. His final 4 appearances for Auckland were against his old Wellington side which saw Auckland win 12-11 before a crowd of 7,500 again at Victoria Park, and the touring New South Wales The match with New south Wales was played at the Auckland Domain and saw the tourists win easily by 27–2. Followed by 2 tour matches against Taranaki and Wellington at the conclusion of the season. He scored a try in each match though Auckland lost both of them.

Cook was then picked to play for New Zealand against New South Wales. The match was played at the Auckland Domain on 6 September once again with 20,000 in attendance. Cook played on the win in a 33–19 loss.

The 1914 season saw Cook transfer from Newton Rangers to the Otahuhu United side. In a similar club season to the one before he scored 7 tries and kicked 4 goals which saw him finish 2nd on the try scoring list, one behind Karl Ifwersen, and 3rd on the point scoring list behind Ifwersen and Ernie Asher in the 1914 Auckland Rugby League season.

It was said in June of the 1915 season that the Otahuhu club had no objection to Cook being granted a transfer to the Taupiri club though it is unknown if he played any football there as there were no records of him playing there in the newspapers of the time. When he enlisted in the World War I effort it was said that he was in camp in Morrinsville.

== War and death ==
Cook was a part of the New Zealand Māori (Pioneer) Battalion. He was somewhat 'injury prone' while at war and was admitted to the Second London General Hospital on January 14, 1918, suffering from a compound fracture of his left index finger. It was noted that it was the third time he had been injured. Cook died on October 12, 1918, from broncho-pneumonia while at the No. 7 Canadian General Hospital in the field in France. He was buried at Étaples Military Cemetery in Étaples, near Boulogne in north-west France.

== Personal life ==
Cook married Mary Lily Ryan 2 days before enlisting in the army for World War 1. They had a daughter, Rangimarie.
