= John Bollard (politician) =

New Zealand politician (c. 1839 – 1915)

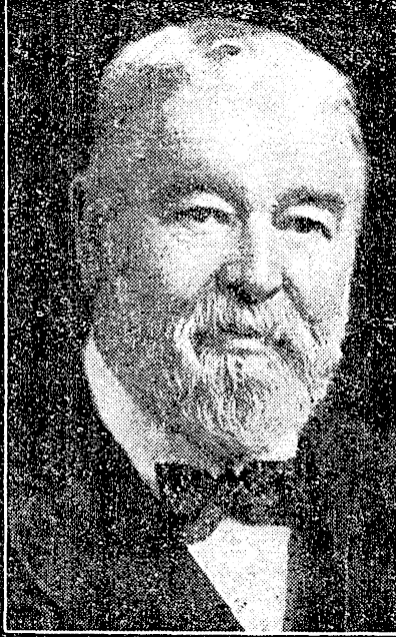
Photograph of John Bollard

John Bollard (1839 or 1840 – 23 March 1915) was an independent conservative, then Reform Party (1908), Member of Parliament in New Zealand. He was elected to the Eden electorate in the 1896 general election, and retired in 1914.

== Biography ==
New Zealand Parliament
Years	Term	Electorate	Party
1896–1899	13th	Eden	Independent
1899–1902	14th	Eden	Independent
1902–1905	15th	Eden	Independent
1905–1908	16th	Eden	Independent
1908–1909	17th	Eden	Independent
1909–1911	Changed allegiance to:		Reform
1911–1914	18th	Eden	Reform

Bollard was born in County Wicklow, Ireland, on either 17 December 1839 or 1 January 1840. He spent a short time in the Australian goldfields around 1860–61. He then went from Sydney to Auckland, New Zealand, taking 200 horses on behalf of the military authorities, for the use of militia, war having broken out between Māori and the government a short time before. Soon after arriving in Auckland he met Jane Ganly, who had also immigrated from Ireland. They were married at St John's College on 9 May 1861. They lived at Rosebank Road in Avondale their entire married life. Bollard is the one who popularised the name Avondale for the area, referencing the Avondale Forest in County Wicklow.

Bollard farmed for several years, then became a land agent and valuer. He served as a sergeant in the militia during the New Zealand Wars of the 1860s, first at Ōtāhuhu and then at the Avondale blockhouse. He was a member of the Avondale School Committee from 1861 to 1915, and was chairman for all but three of those years. He was chairman of the Avondale Road Board for 28 years, and at one time its engineer. He was the coroner at Avondale for about 30 years, a justice of the peace for nearly 40 years, and a member of the Eden Licensing Committee and the Auckland Hospital and Charitable Aid Board. He was one of the founders and original trustees of St Jude's Church in Avondale, and a churchwarden for many years.

In 1911 he was part of a group of people who formed the Eden Ramblers rugby league football club at a meeting in Avondale. He was elected president for their inaugural season. The club, which was largely based in the Avondale and Point Chevalier areas, only lasted until midway through the 1913 season.

His wife Jane, with whom he had 14 children, died in 1928. Their eldest son, Richard Bollard, was also a Member of Parliament. During the term of the 18th New Zealand Parliament, they were MPs at the same time.

New Zealand Parliament
Preceded by Edwin Mitchelson	Member of Parliament for Eden; 1896–1914	Succeeded by James Parr
