= Eden Ramblers =

New Zealand rugby club

Club information
- Full name: Eden Ramblers
- Colours: Green and Gold
- Founded: 1911
- Exited: 1913

Former details
- Ground(s): Avondale Racecourse
- Competition: Auckland Rugby League

Eden Ramblers was a rugby league club in Auckland which played in the Auckland Rugby League competition from 1911 to 1913. They were based in the Avondale suburb of Auckland where they largely trained and played and held meetings in Point Chevalier.

== Club History ==
=== Formation ===
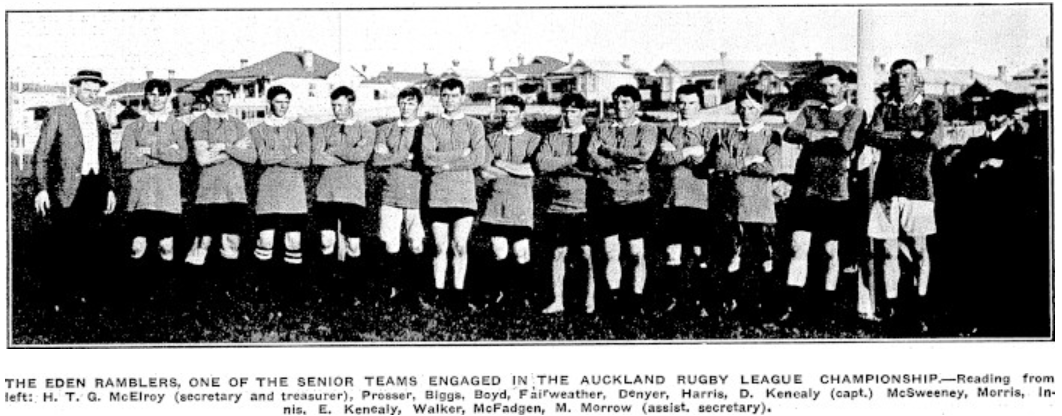
The Eden Ramblers side on 11 May 1912 at Eden Park

On 11 April the New Zealand Herald reported that there was "every probability of a club forming in Avondale" and the league would send officials on the night of the 12th to meet with interested parties. The first meeting was held in Carter's Hall, Point Chevalier on Wednesday 12 April. Mr. Harry Oakley, secretary of the Auckland Rugby League presided. While Percy Ussher, treasurer also addressed the meeting. H.A. Cummings moved, and Bob Noone seconded "that a club be formed to play under Northern Union rules, to affiliate with the Auckland Provincial Rugby League". The motion was carried unanimously. Mr. John Bollard, M.P. was elected as the first president of the club and B. Noone the honorary secretary ex officio. Thirty members handed their names to the secretary. It was said that they would be made up of players representing the Avondale, Point Chevalier, and Mount Albert districts. The club stated that they intended to enter a team for both senior and junior grades. It was also noted that there had been a misunderstanding about the meeting venue and an apology was given to some of the Avondale players. Their next meeting was put down for Wednesday, 19 April at the same location.

The club met again on the evening of 26 April at a meeting in the Avondale Public Hall which still stands, to the left of the Hollywood Cinema. Mr. John Bollard, M.P. (president of the club) presided over the meeting. It was decided to name the club the Eden Ramblers Football Club with their colours to be green and gold. The following were elected to their first board:- Hon. Secretary, Mr. B. Noone; management committee, Messrs W.A. Cummings, J Eddowes, W. Fairweather, M. Morrow, and J. Denyer. With the addition of “several new members” the total club membership was “close to 50”. They had already begun to organise a practice match at Victoria Park with the Ponsonby United club.

On 29 April it was reported that "the newly formed Avondale club will practice with the Ponsonby players at Victoria Park" on the same day. Their first ever meeting was in Point Chevalier however they practised and played some matches also in Avondale. One possible explanation for their choice of name (Eden) was that their first club president, M.P. John Bollard was the M.P. for the Eden Electorate which Avondale was a part of.

=== First season ===
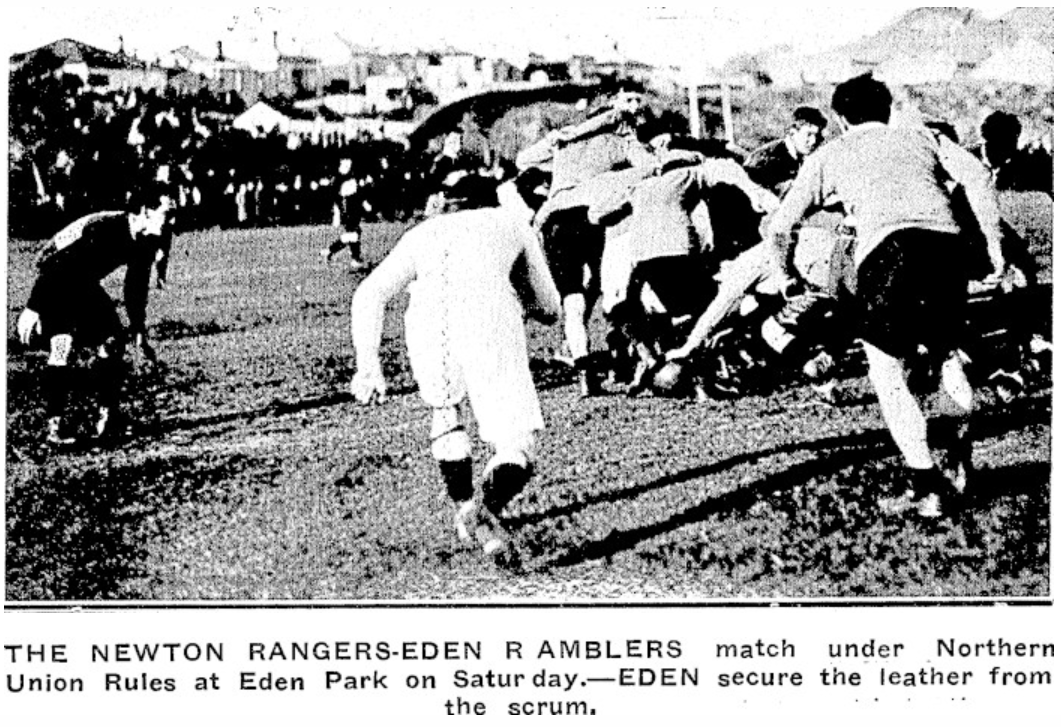

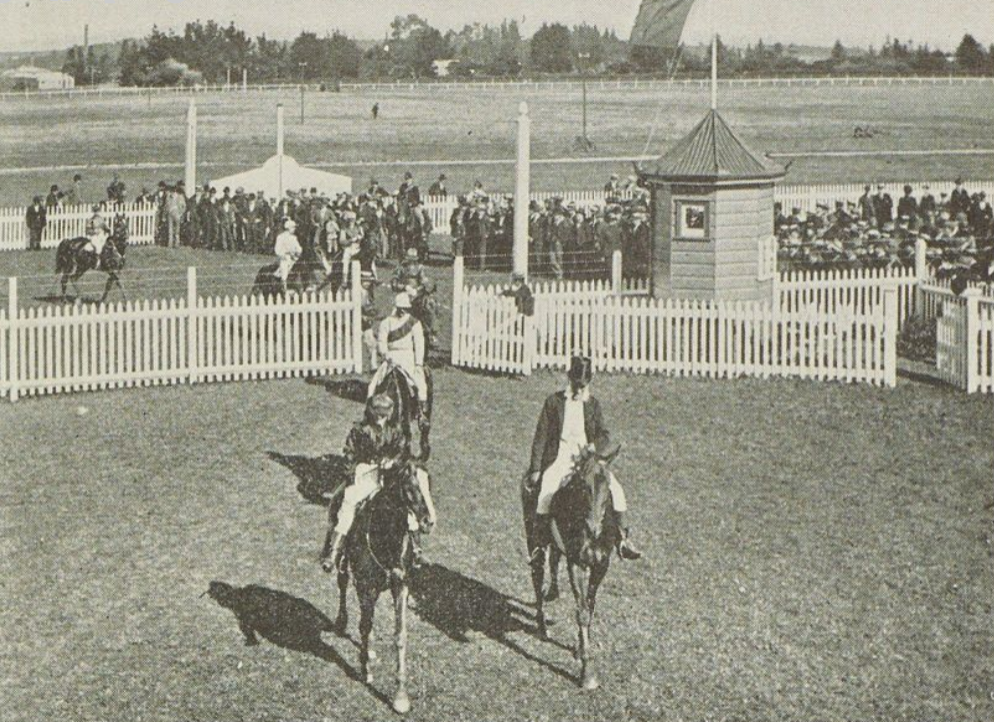
The Eden club played matches on the racecourse to the left of this image from 1902.

They immediately entered a team in the first grade competition and joined Auckland Rugby League foundation clubs Ponsonby United, City Rovers, North Shore Albions, and Newton Rangers. They also held their early practises at the Avondale Racecourse. They held a practice match with Ponsonby on the Avondale Racecourse on 13 May. They had a bye in the first round and so played an A and B match at the racecourse in order to select a “junior team”. They then entered a team in the third grade as well as their senior side in A grade. The results for the third grade were only partially reported. The side had 2 wins and 3 losses reported.

The Eden Ramblers first playing squad was Mew, Bert Denyer, John Denyer, Noone, Bob (Robert) Biggs, Prosser, W. Fairweather, Morrow, Don Kenealy, Ray, Brett, J Cummings, A. Walker, Harris (2), O. Patterson, and R. McGowan. Their first ever official match was played against Ponsonby United at Victoria Park on 27 May. They were defeated 49 points to 10. Their first ever win, which was their only one of the season was against Newton Rangers on 22 July at the Auckland Domain. They won the match 14 to 5 with Don Kenealy scoring a try, Harris 2, Fairweather 1, and Kenealy kicking a penalty.

J. Cummings became their first representative player when he was selected in the forwards to play for Auckland against New Zealand on 10 June.

During the season they held a dance at Avondale, and another at Point Chevalier. They had also rented out the Point Chevalier Hall for two nights a week for eight months.

=== 1912 Season ===
Their committee in 1912 was president Mr. John Bollard, M.P., vice presidents, Messrs. T. Dignan, John Potter, T.B. Clay, T. Kennealy, A.W. Page, A. Grandison, T. gardiner, Anderson, Robertson, J. Hankin, T.J. McIvor, Muir, Alley, W. Faulder, Dr. Rossiter, Secretary treasurer and delegate to the Auckland Rugby League; Mr. T.G. McIlroy; Assistant secretary, Mr. H. Morrow; Players delegates Messrs. Biggs, Kennealey, social committee, Messrs. W. and H. Fairweather, Dwyer, Biggs and Patterson. They were to hold their 1912 annual concert once again in the Point Chevalier Hall.

The 1912 season also saw them field a third grade team once again. Of their reported matches they won 3 and lost 3 and finished mid table. Eden also fielded a fourth grade side which was reported to have won 1 game and lost 3 with a handful of other scores not reported. Then in 1913 they fielded two sides in the third grade and one in the fourth grade.

=== Exit ===
The team struggled and ultimately folded in 1913. On 5 April 1919 the Auckland Star reported that a "new club that has just been affiliated is the Eden Ramblers, boys from Avondale and Point Chevalier". The new team however was not to become known as the Eden Ramblers but in fact were named Point Chevalier.

== Playing record ==
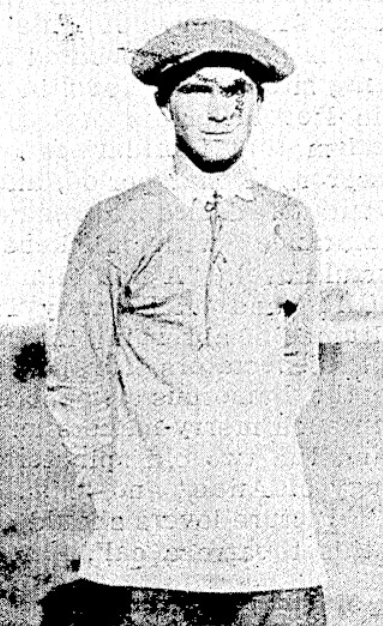
Don Kenealy, their captain and sole New Zealand representative.

In 1911 they played 7 matches with 1 win and 6 losses leaving them in last place. The 1912 season saw Eden record a 2 win, 1 draw, 8 loss record. Both of their wins were against City Rovers (10-6 and 25–5). While their draw was against Ponsonby. They also entered a team in the 3rd grade competition where they won 3 and lost three to finish 4th out of 7 teams. During the 1912 season Don Kenealy was selected to play for New Zealand on their tour of Australia. He played 4 matches for them on the wing. He also played 4 times for Auckland scoring a try against Lower Waikato. While halfback Thomas Herbert (Bert) Biggs was their only other Auckland representative for the season playing in the same match. Eden also fielded teams in the third grade and fourth grade. In 1913 they only lasted 5 games in the first grade competition before being unable to field a team. Their lone win in a 1 win, 4 loss season was against Manukau.

They finished their two and a half seasons with a 4 win, 1 draw, 18 loss record in the first grade. The club did not field any teams beyond the end of the 1913 season.

=== Myers Cup (first grade championship) ===
Season	Name	Pld	W	D	L	PF	PA	PD	Pts	Position (Teams)
1911	Eden Ramblers	7	1	0	6	42	149	-107	2	Fifth (Five)
1912	Eden Ramblers	10	2	1	8	78	210	-132	5	Sixth (Six)
1913	Eden Ramblers	5	1	0	4	18	124	-106	2	Fifth (Six)
1911-13	Total	22	4	1	18	138	483	-345	9	N/A

=== Senior team players and point scorers (1911-1913) ===
This list is compiled from published team lists and match reports in the Auckland Star and New Zealand Herald. There were several matches with no team lists published or with limited point scoring details as such the list is only about 80% complete.

Top point scorers
No	Player	Start	End	Games	Tries	Con	Pen	Pts
1	Don Kenealy	1911	1913	14	4	6	5	34
2	G Harris	1911	1912	8	5	0	0	15
3	A Innes	1912	-	8	3	0	0	9
4	Thomas Herbert (Bert) Biggs	1911	1913	17	2	1	0	8
5	Bright	1912	1913	6	2	0	0	6
6	Brett	1911	1912	8	1	1	0	5
7	Bond	1912	1913	11	1	0	0	3
7	J Cummings	1911	-	6	1	0	0	3
7	Bertram Denyer	1911	1913	14	1	0	0	3
7	W Fairweather	1911	1912	14	1	0	0	3
7	McSweeney	1912	-	1	1	0	0	3
7	Emmet Kenealy	1912	-	8	1	0	0	3
13	A Walker	1911	1912	10	0	0	0	0
13	Postlewaite	1912	1913	9	0	0	0	0
13	William Prosser	1911	1912	9	0	0	0	0
13	Hawkes	1912	-	6	0	0	0	0
13	Noone	1911	-	6	0	0	0	0
13	John Denyer	1913	-	5	0	0	0	0
13	Maurice	1912	-	5	0	0	0	0
13	McFadgen	1912	-	4	0	0	0	0
13	Morris	1912	-	4	0	0	0	0
13	Ray/Rae	1911	-	5	0	0	0	0
13	J Allen	1913	-	4	0	0	0	0
13	P Neville	1913	-	4	0	0	0	0
13	W Proctor	1912	-	4	0	0	0	0
13	Wain	1911	-	4	0	0	0	0
13	Barton	1912	-	3	0	0	0	0
13	H Bert	1913	-	3	0	0	0	0
13	V Elliott	1912	1913	3	0	0	0	0
13	Hardman	1911	-	3	0	0	0	0
13	Hutchinson	1912	-	3	0	0	0	0
13	James	1912	-	3	0	0	0	0
13	Toroa	1911	-	3	0	0	0	0
13	Barker	1912	1913	2	0	0	0	0
13	Cole	1913	-	2	0	0	0	0
13	Fisher	1913	-	2	0	0	0	0
13	Thompson	1913	-	2	0	0	0	0
13	Walworth	1912	-	2	0	0	0	0
13	Clarke	1912	-	1	0	0	0	0
13	Edwards	1912	-	1	0	0	0	0
13	Fuller	1913	-	1	0	0	0	0
13	Hennessey	1911	-	1	0	0	0	0
13	Lilly	1912	-	1	0	0	0	0
13	Mansell	1912	-	1	0	0	0	0
13	McCown	1911	-	1	0	0	0	0
13	McDonald	1912	-	1	0	0	0	0
13	McKenzie	1912	-	1	0	0	0	0
13	Ramsey	1912	-	1	0	0	0	0
13	Rowe	1912	-	1	0	0	0	0
13	Sylvado	1913	-	1	0	0	0	0
13	Wilson	1912	-	1	0	0	0	0

=== Head to Head records ===
Top point scorers
Opponent	Start	End	Games	Wins	Draws	Losses	Defaults/Forfeits	For	Against
Ponsonby United	1911	1913	5	0	1	4	0	33	158
Newton Rangers	1911	1913	5	1	0	4	0	31	130
North Shore Albions	1911	1913	5	0	0	5	0	14	111
City Rovers	1911	1913	4	2	0	2	0	41	49
Manukau Rovers	1912	1913	3	1	0	2	1	19	35
TOTAL			22	4	1	17	1	138	383

== Representative players ==
=== New Zealand ===
Player	Years	Appearances	Tries	Goals	Points	New Zealand	Appearances	Points
Don Kenealy	1911-13 (Eden Ramblers)	16	4	11	34	1912	4	0

=== Auckland ===
- J. Cummings 1911 (1)
- Don Kenealy 1911-13 (8)

=== Auckland B ===
- Bob (Robert) Biggs 1912 (2 appearances, 1 try)
