= City Newton Dragons =

Defunct New Zealand rugby league club

Club information
- Full name: City Newton Dragons Rugby League Football Club
- Colours: Red, White, and Black
- Founded: 1948; 78 years ago
- Exited: 2004; 22 years ago

Former details
- Ground: Victoria Park
- Competition: Auckland Rugby League

Records
- Minor premierships: 1957
- Sharman Cup: 1966, 1969, 1984
- Norton Cup: 1974
- Lawson Cup: 1984

The City Newton Dragons are a defunct New Zealand rugby league club that was based at Victoria Park, Auckland. The club was created in 1948 by a merger of two original clubs, the City Rovers and Newton Rangers. Both the Rovers and the Rangers participated in the inaugural Auckland Rugby League competition in 1910. In 2004, the club was absorbed by the Ponsonby Ponies, who play a match in the City Newton colours annually to keep the heritage of the club alive.

== History ==
=== City Rovers ===
City Rovers
Club information
- Colours: Red and Black
- Founded: 1909
- Exited: 1948

Former details
- Grounds: Victoria Park; Carlaw Park; Auckland Domain
- Competition: Auckland Rugby League

Records
- Premierships: (9) 1910, 1911, 1916, 1921, 1922, 1923, 1925, 1942, 1944
- Roope Rooster: 1916, 1921
- Thacker Shield: 1921
- Minor Premiership (Rukutai Shield): 1942, 1944
- Stormont Shield: 1944
- Phelan Shield: 1939

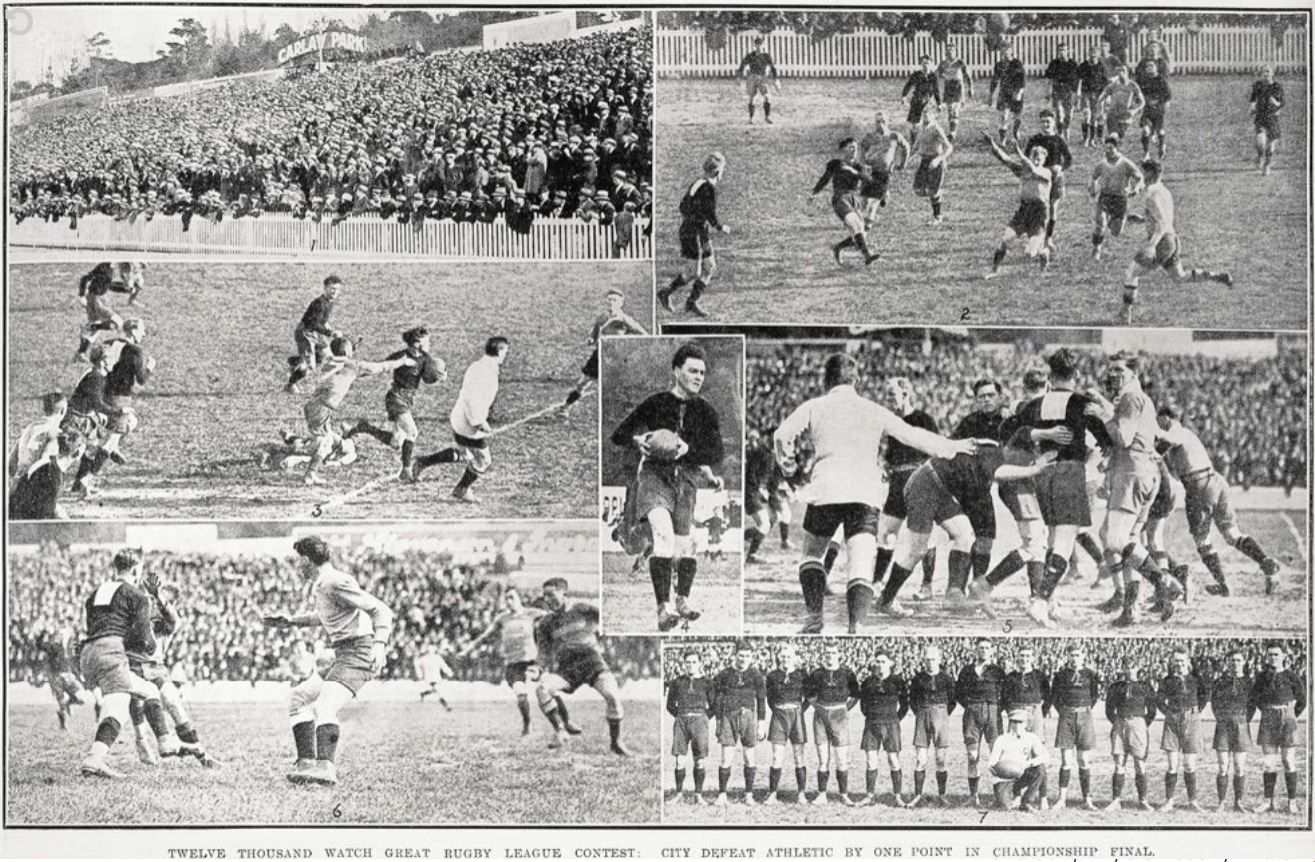
City v Athletic in the championship final of 1923 at Carlaw Park.

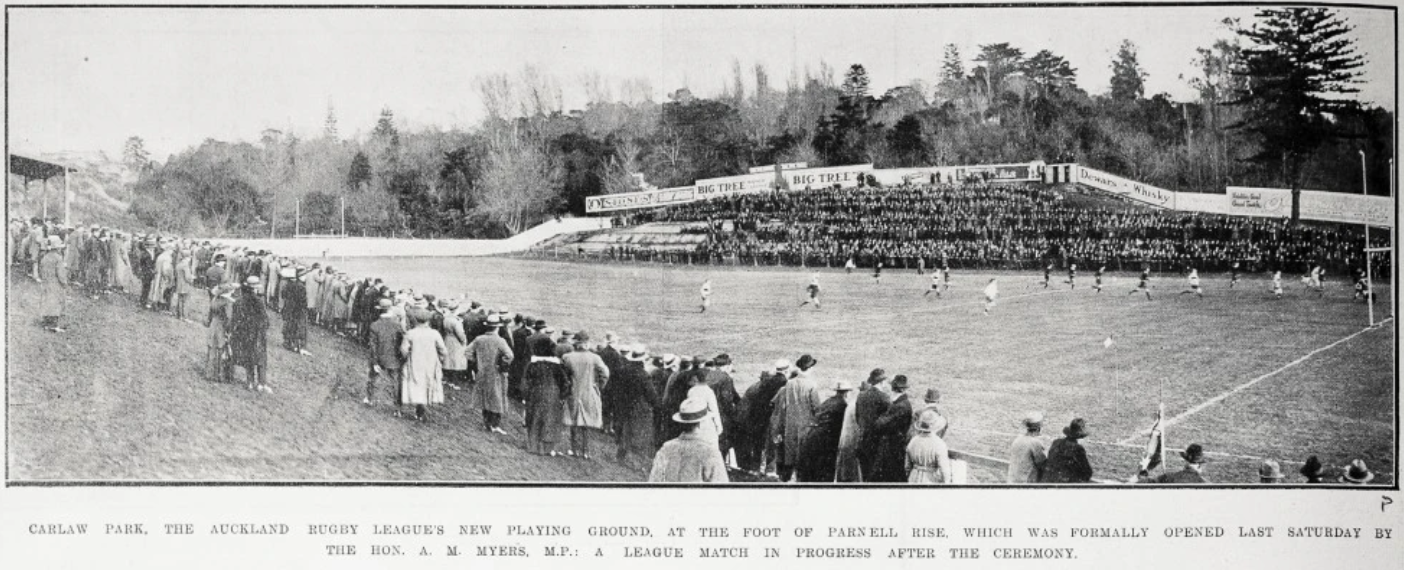
City Rovers v Maritime in the first ever game at Carlaw Park on June 25, 1921. City won 10-8 against Maritime Football Club.

The City Rovers were formed in the days following the formation of the Auckland Rugby League on 19 July 1909. In their first year City played against the Ponsonby Ponies, City included Ernie and Albert Asher, Jim Rukutai and Alex Stanaway.

City won the Auckland Rugby League's first competition, being awarded the Myers Cup in 1910. The Cup had been donated by Arthur Myers.

City again won premierships in 1911, 1916, 1921, 1922, 1923, 1925 and 1944. In 1921 they completed a unique treble by also winning the Roope Rooster and Thacker Shield in the same year.

=== Newton Rangers ===
Newton Rangers
Club information
- Colours: Red and White
- Founded: 1909
- Exited: 1948

Former details
- Competition: Auckland Rugby League

Records
- Premierships: 1912, 1927
- Roope Rooster: 1919, 1920, 1935
- Stormont Shield: 1927
- Phelan Shield: 1934

The Newtown Rangers were formed in the days following the formation of the Auckland Rugby League on 19 July 1909. They lost to Ponsonby United 6–16 on 21 August at Victoria Park.

The club won premierships in 1912 and 1927 and they won the Roope Rooster in 1919, 1920 and 1935. In 1927 they won the Stormont Shield defeating Richmond 25-17 in the final.

=== 1948-2004 ===
The City Rovers and Newton Rangers clubs amalgamated to form City Newton in 1948.

During the 1960s the Auckland Rugby League instituted a districts programme and Ellerslie, City Newton and Eastern Suburbs combined to form Eastern Districts. The combination won almost every trophy between 1960 and 1963 before the clubs regained their separate identities.

In 2001 City Newton competed in the Auckland Rugby League's second division, the Sharman Cup.

The City Newton Sports Club Incorporated was struck off as an Incorporated Society on 17 June 2004.

In 2014, the popular Auckland hip-hop trio Team Dynamite referenced the City Newton Dragons in the song, Very On.

== Notable players ==
The following players played for the New Zealand national rugby league team while with the club;

=== City Rovers Kiwis ===
Players who played for New Zealand while playing for City Rovers. In brackets is the year that they first appeared for New Zealand while also playing for Newton.

- Albert Asher (1910)
- Ernie Asher (1910)
- Sid Kean (1911)
- Frank Morse (1911)
- Jim Rukutai (1911)
- Alex Stanaway (1911)
- Bob Mitchell (1912)
- Bill Davidson (1919)
- Bert Laing (1919)
- Ivan Stewart (1919)
- Tom Haddon (1919)
- George Paki (1921)
- Harry Tancred (1921)
- Maurice Wetherill (1924)
- Hec McDonald (1924)
- Lou Brown (1925)
- Ben Davidson (1926)
- Stan Clark (1930)
- Len Barchard (1930)
- Steve Watene (1930)
- Hawea Mataira (1939)

=== City Rovers other notable players ===
- Bill Hadley (1934-36 All Black)

=== Newton Rangers Kiwis ===
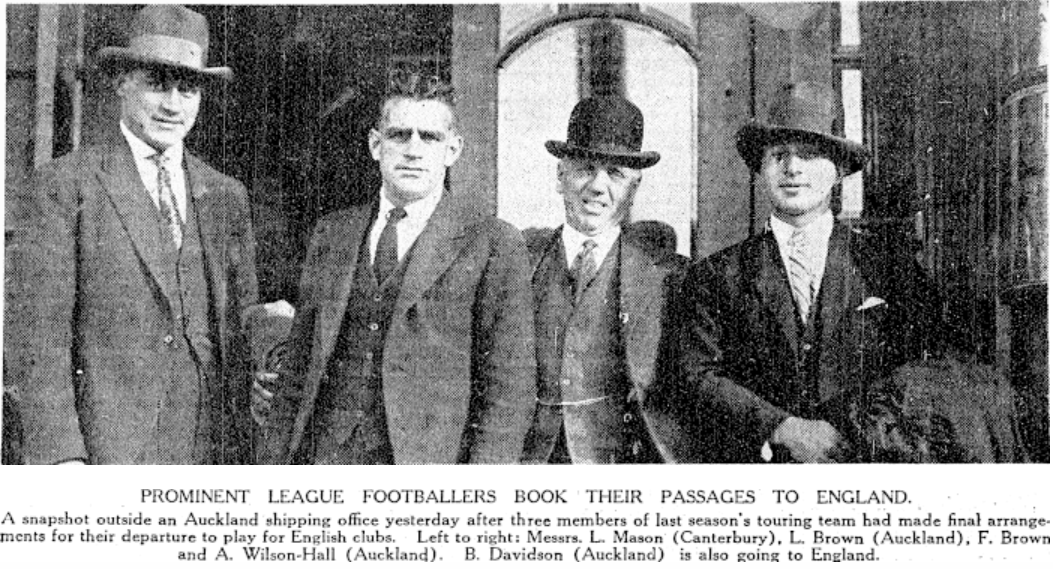
Lou Brown prior to departing for England, with Wilson Hall and Len Mason of the Maritime club.

Players who played for New Zealand while playing for Newton Rangers. In brackets is the year that they first appeared for New Zealand while also playing for Newton. Lou Brown (pictured) played for Newton in 1922-23 before transferring to City and then being selected for New Zealand in 1925.

- Thomas Houghton (1909)
- Arthur Francis (1911)
- George A. Gillett (1911)
- Billy Curran (1912)
- Billy Dervan (1912)
- George Cook (1913)
- Bill Cloke (1919)
- Wally Somers (1919)
- Bill Williams (1919)
- Craddock Dufty (1919)
- George Iles (1919)
- Nelson Bass (1919)
- Joe Bennett (1920)
- Clarrie Polson (1920)
- Trevor Hall (1928)
- Roy Hardgrave (1928)
- Allen Alfred (Ed) St George (1932)
- Ted Brimble (1932)
- Claude Dempsey (1936)
- Bill McNeight (1937)

=== City Newton Kiwis ===
- Ron O'Regan (1983)
- Dean Lonergan 1985

== Club Titles ==
=== City Rovers grade championships (1910-1944) ===
- 1910 1st Grade (Myers Cup)
- 1911 1st Grade (Myers Cup)
- 1914 4th Grade
- 1915 2nd Grade and 5th Grade
- 1916 1st Grade (Myers Cup), 3rd Grade, 4th Grade and 6th Grade
- 1917 3rd Grade and 4th Grade
- 1918 6th Grade
- 1919 4th Grade and 5th Grade
- 1920 2nd Grade and 4th Grade
- 1921 1st Grade (Monteith Shield) and 5th Grade
- 1922 1st Grade (Monteith Shield), 2nd Grade and 6th Grade
- 1923 1st Grade (Monteith Shield) and 2nd Grade
- 1924 3rd Grade
- 1925 1st Grade (Monteith Shield) and 3rd Grade
- 1926 6th Grade
- 1934 5th Grade
- 1936 4th Grade
- 1937 6th Grade
- 1938 4th Grade
- 1939 4th Grade
- 1940 4th Grade
- 1941 4th Grade
- 1944 1st Grade (Fox Memorial Shield)

==== Other titles ====
- 1916 Roope Rooster
- 1918 Roope Rooster
- 1921 Roope Rooster
- 1924 Roope Rooster
- 1939 Phelan Shield
- 1942 Rukutai Shield (combined City-Otahuhu side)
- 1944 Rukutai Shield
- 1944 Stormont Shield

=== Newton Rangers grade championships (1910-1942) ===
- 1912 First Grade (Myers Cup)
- 1921 Second Grade
- 1927 First Grade (Monteith Shield)
- 1932 Fifth Grade
- 1934 Fourth Grade
- 1937 Schoolboys (Junior)
- 1939 Schoolboys (Senior)
- 1940 Schoolboys (Intermediate)

==== Other titles ====
- 1919 Roope Rooster
- 1920 Roope Rooster
- 1927 Stormont Shield
- 1928 Second grade knockout
- 1934 Phelan Shield
- 1935 Roope Rooster

== Top point scorers (City Rovers and Newton Rangers) 1909-44 ==
=== City Rovers top point scorers (1909-1945) ===
The point scoring lists are compiled from all official organised matches including championship, Roope Rooster, Phelan Shield, Stormont Shield, tour matches, exhibition matches, and charity games.

Top point scorers
No	Player	Start	End	Games	Tries	Con	Pen	DG	M	Points
1	Bill Davidson	1915	1923	89	51	111	32	8	1	457
2	Ben Davidson	1919	1933	147	83	11	1	6	0	285
3	Puti Tipene Watene	1929	1935	89	15	79	39	0	0	281
4	Maurice Wetherill	1916	1930	127	38	37	10	0	2	212
5	Lou Brown	1924	1936	61	68	1	0	0	0	206
6	Albert Silva	1939	1945	70	16	27	35	0	0	172
7=	Warwick Clarke	1940	1944	84	3	35	39	2	0	161
7=	Alan Donovan	1938	1945	67	21	32	16	1	0	161
9	Laurie Barchard	1928	1932	62	25	32	7	0	0	153
10	Ernie Asher	1910	1918	67	3	41	25	0	5	151
11	George Davidson	1922	1925	54	40	14	1	0	0	150
12	Harry Hawkes	1919	1926	80	43	9	1	0	0	149
13	William McLaughlin	1926	1938	131	45	2	0	1	0	141
14	George Perry	1927	1933	79	44	0	1	1	0	136
15	Jackie Rata	1936	1939	60	12	15	32	1	0	132
16	Bill Turei	1932	1935	46	31	12	5	1	0	129
17	Douglas Hutchison	1935	1943	88	19	21	10	2	0	121
18	Selby Crewther	1923	1926	55	14	30	6	1	0	116
18	Cyril Wiberg	1934	1938	73	6	24	21	3	0	114
19	Albert Asher	1910	1917	53	17	17	8	1	0	103
20	George Wade	1926	1928	31	28	0	0	0	0	84
21	Nelson Bass	1924	1930	49	12	14	3	2	0	74
22	J.P. (Chook) Mitchell	1916	1926	127	23	1	0	0	0	71
23	A Smith	1939	1940	34	16	9	2	0	0	70
24	Alf Townsend	1921	1926	79	21	3	0	0	0	69
25	George Paki	1917	1925	64	21	1	0	0	0	65
26	Jim Gould	1939	1943	63	21	0	0	0	0	63
27	Hawea Mataira	1937	1944	109	20	0	0	0	0	60
28	Jim Rukutai	1910	1919	62	14	3	5	0	0	58
29	Bob Clarke	1916	1921	56	19	0	0	0	0	57
30	Reginald Purdy	1923	1934	37	18	1	0	0	0	56

=== Newton Rangers top point scorers (1909-1945) ===
The point scoring lists are compiled from matches played in the first grade championship, Roope Rooster, Phelan Shield and Stormont Shield matches which involved all first grade sides. It also includes additional one off type matches such as those against non-Auckland teams or charity matches.

Top point scorers
No	Player	Start	End	Games	Tries	Con	Pen	DG	M	Points
1	Craddock Dufty	1919	1929	55	5	68	34	3	0	225
2	Wilfred Brimble	1935	1939	97	12	35	24	0	0	154
3	Claude Dempsey	1930	1940	169	6	39	26	1	0	150
4	Clarrie Polson	1920	1928	72	20	32	9	0	1	144
5	Hugh Brady	1934	1944	65	27	11	12	0	0	127
6	Ted Brimble	1930	1940	131	39	3	2	0	0	127
7	Roy Hardgrave	1924	1941	59	38	4	0	0	0	122
8	George Iles	1916	1919	43	34	7	0	0	0	116
9=	Alan Clarke	1922	1928	77	29	8	6	0	0	115
9=	Harry Miller Emus	1940	1942	25	17	18	14	0	0	115
9=	Wally Somers	1917	1929	128	35	5	0	0	0	115
12	Mortimer Stephens	1933	1940	57	37	0	0	0	0	111
13	Frederick Sissons	1936	1938	42	6	29	16	0	0	108
14	Bert Little	1926	1929	53	34	1	0	0	0	104
15	Arnold Porteous	1931	1934	58	15	19	9	0	0	101
16	Arthur Mansill	1918	1929	41	10	25	9	0	0	98
17	Joe Bennett	1910	1916	56	19	10	9	0	0	95
18	R Clark	1913	1917	32	19	11	7	0	0	93
19	Trevor Hall	1927	1934	80	29	0	0	0	0	87
20	Hill	1929	1938	52	12	14	9	0	0	82
21	Cyril Brimble	1929	1930	29	12	12	8	0	0	76
22	Len Farrant	1909	1918	66	12	13	5	1	0	74
23	S Anderson	1939	1940	25	1	16	19	0	0	73
24	Jack Ginders	1936	1943	109	24	0	0	0	0	72
25	Roy Niwa	1941	1945	39	4	14	18	0	0	67

=== City Rovers Head to Head records (1909-1920) ===
Head to head records by opponent
Opponent	Start	Finish	Games	Wins	Draws	Losses	For	Against
North Shore Albions	1909	1920	22	11	3	8	275	202
Newton Rangers	1910	1920	26	19	1	6	393	221
Ponsonby United	1910	1920	30	17	2	11	357	288
Eden Ramblers	1911	1913	4	2	0	2	49	41
Manukau	1912	1913	3	2	0	1	15	10
Otahuhu	1914	1917	7	6	0	1	69	21
Grafton Athletic	1914	1920	16	13	0	3	282	129
Maritime	1918	1920	8	4	0	4	79	83
Marist Old Boys	1919	1920	3	1	0	2	10	29
Lower Waikato	1916	1916	1	1	0	0	19	8
Waterside Workers	1917	1917	1	1	0	0	13	7
Railway	1917	1917	1	1	0	0	18	6
Maritime XIII	1919	1919	1	0	0	3	13	19
