= Jim Griffen =

New Zealand international rugby league footballer

Personal information
- Full name: James Griffen
- Born: 1885; New Zealand
- Died: Deceased

Playing information
- Position: Prop
Club
Years	Team	Pld	T	G	FG	P
1909–19	North Shore Albions	53	10	9	0	48
Representative
Years	Team	Pld	T	G	FG	P
1909–13	Auckland	19	7	2	0	25
1910	New Zealand	1	0	0	0	0

James Griffen is a New Zealand rugby league footballer who represented New Zealand.

== Playing career ==
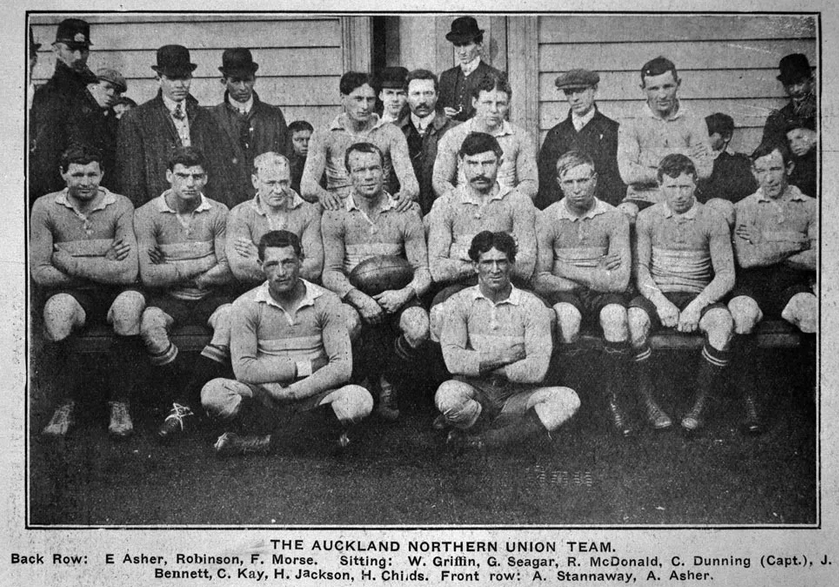
Griffen in the Auckland side to play Wellington on 5 August 1911.

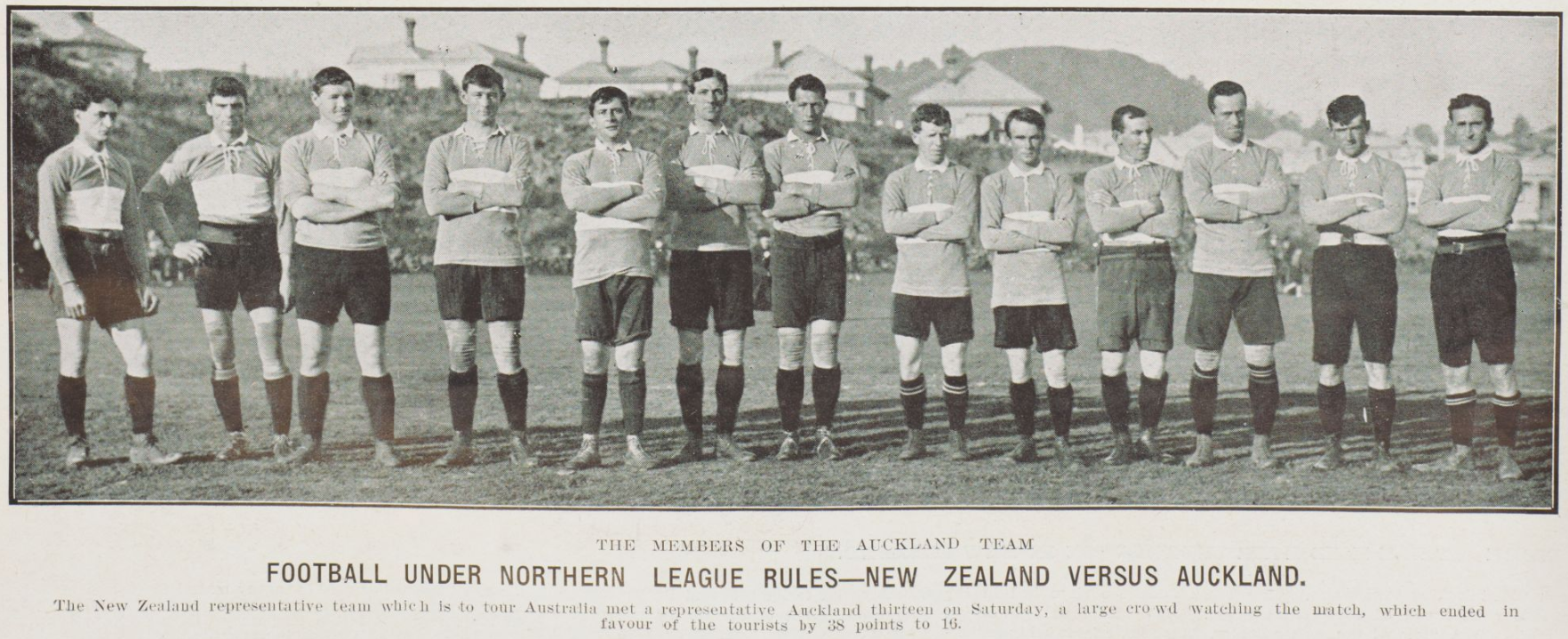
Griffen in the Auckland side to play New Zealand at Eden Park in 1912. he is 3rd from the left.

Griffen played for Auckland in 1909 against Taranaki.

In 1910 he played twice against the touring Great Britain Lions, once for Auckland and once for New Zealand. In 1912 he was part of the Auckland side that defeated New Zealand 38-16 prior to their tour of Australia.
