= Harry Fricker =

New Zealand rugby player

Personal information
- Full name: Harry Ernest Fricker
- Born: 19 September 1884
- Died: 28 December 1957 (aged 73)

Playing information
- Weight: 12 st 9 lb (80 kg)

Rugby union
Club
| Years | Team | Pld | T | G | FG | P |
|---|---|---|---|---|---|---|
| 1908–09 | Ponsonby | 3 | 2 | 0 | 0 | 6 |

Rugby league
- Position: Prop, Second-row
Club
| Years | Team | Pld | T | G | FG | P |
|---|---|---|---|---|---|---|
| 1910–14 | Ponsonby United | 40 | 7 | 0 | 0 | 21 |
Representative
| Years | Team | Pld | T | G | FG | P |
| 1910–14 | Auckland | 28 | 9 | 0 | 0 | 27 |

Harry Fricker was a New Zealand rugby league footballer who was one of the founding players of the Ponsonby United team. He represented Auckland from 1910 to 1914. He fought in World War I and was injured in battle.

== Early years ==
Harry Fricker originally played rugby for the Ponsonby District Football Club and was a junior representative player while there. He was a house decorator by trade and worked in partnership with his brother.

== Rugby league ==
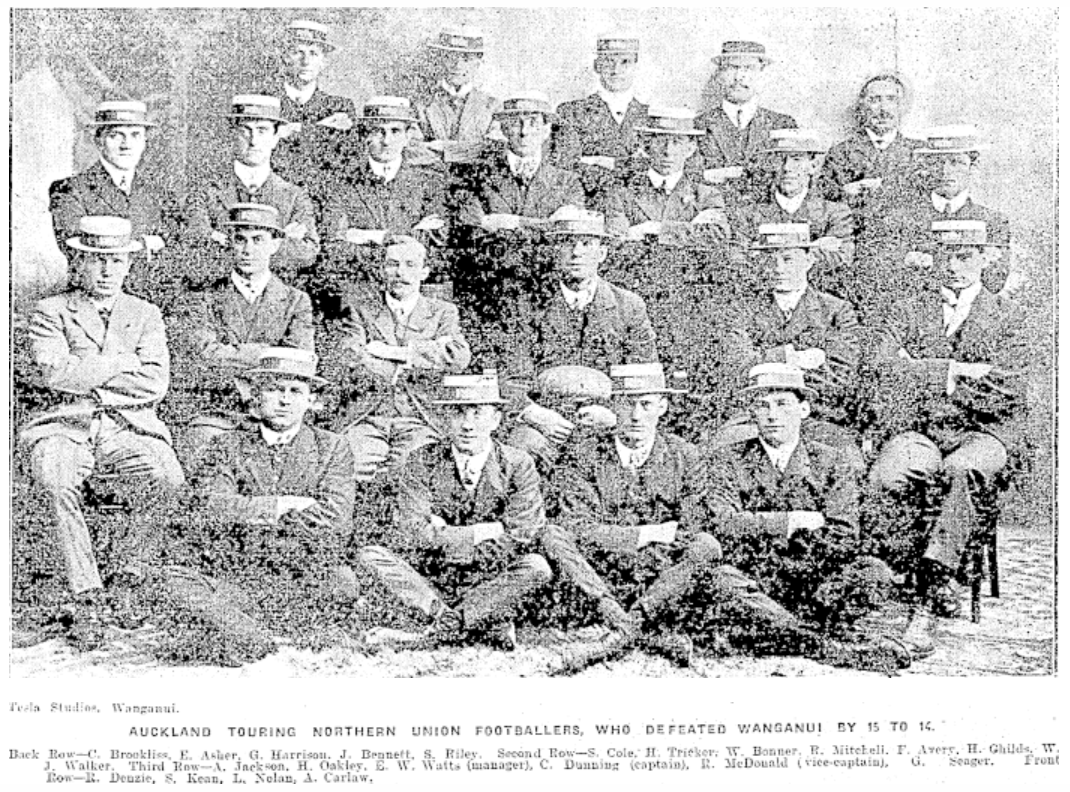

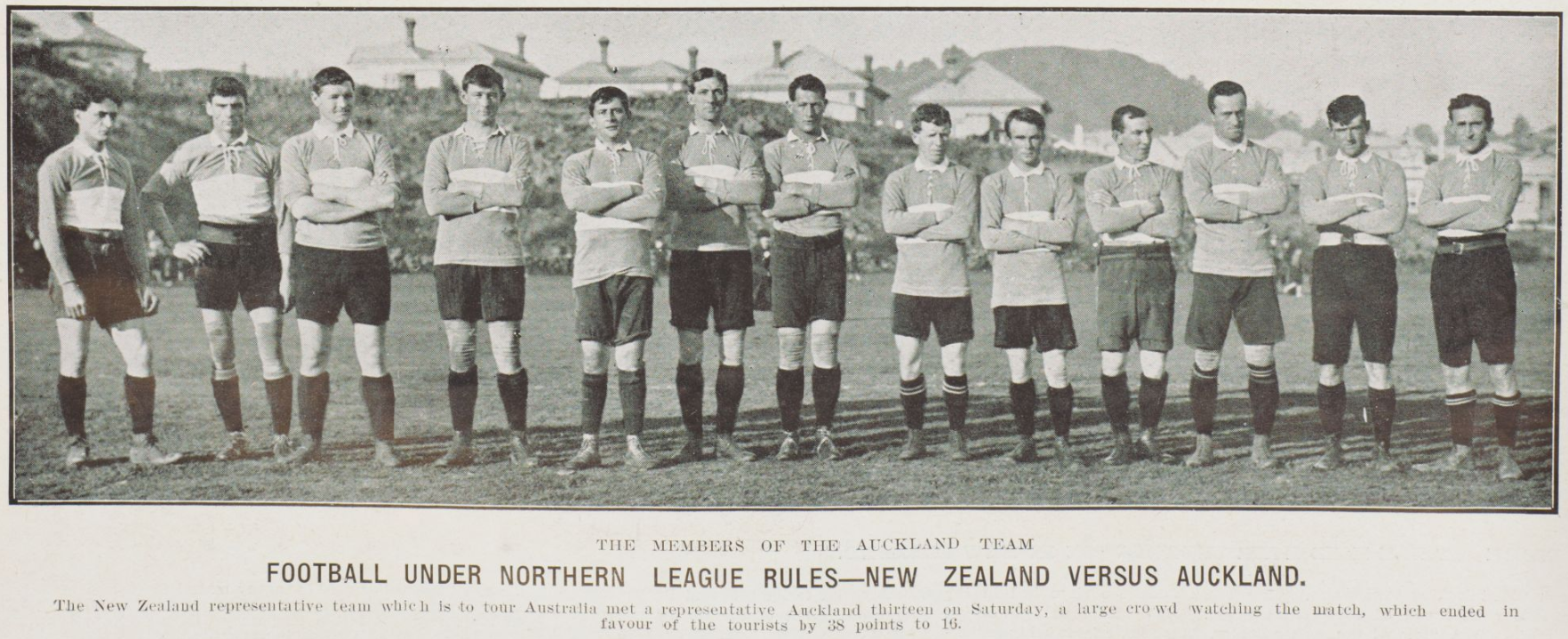
Auckland 1912 side with Fricker third from the right.

In 1910 he switched to rugby league as part of a large group of players from the Ponsonby club who changed codes at the same time. He played for the Ponsonby United club who had recently formed. He was selected for the Auckland team which played against Great Britain at Victoria Park on 23 July 1910 and went on tour with the side on their seven match tour of New Zealand playing 7 matches in all in that season. He continued to play for Ponsonby until 1914.

== World War I ==
In August 1914 Fricker volunteered for the armed forces. He was part of the New Zealand Field Troop of Engineers who originally camped in Epsom before travelling to Palmerston North. After travelling to England Fricker played for the New Zealand Army rugby team against the English Guards. In June 1917 Sergeant Harry Fricker was awarded a military medal for “acts of gallantry in the field” while serving as an Engineer at the battle of Messines. He left the war after serving four months at Gallipoli where he was invalided to England and hospitalised due to his injuries. He arrived back in New Zealand in April 1918.

== Later years ==
A year after his return from war his wife, Winifred Maude died in Wellington in August. His mother died in September of the same year. Harry Fricker died in 1958. He was 73 years old.
