= 1912 New Zealand rugby league season =

Seasons
- 1911 1913

The 1912 New Zealand rugby league season was the fifth season of rugby league that had been played in New Zealand.

== International competitions ==
New Zealand toured Australia, playing seven games for four wins, including one over New South Wales and two over Queensland. Captain Arthur Francis left mid-way through the tour to start a contract with Wigan, he was replaced as captain by Arthur Carlaw. George A. Gillett coached the side.

Before the tour New Zealand defeated Auckland 38–16. The Auckland side was: E Asher, Seager, J Griffin, G Lambert, G Smith, R Mitchell, A Stanaway, A Jackson, D Kenealy, H Childs, H Fricker, D Healey and A Blakey.

New Zealand then hosted a return tour by New South Wales. The Blues side was virtually Test-standard. Twenty-four players toured, the majority of whom had been in the successful Kangaroos of 1911–12. The Blues began the tour by losing to Canterbury 5–28 before defeating Wellington 45–13 and Taranaki. They then lost to Auckland 3–10 in front of 7,000 fans at Victoria Park. During the match Sid Deane was sent off after punching Billy Curran three times. Others to play for Auckland in the match included Jim Rukutai, George Seagar, Charles Dunning, Bob Mitchell, Harold and Morgan Hayward, Arthur Hardgrave and Rukingi Reki from the Rotorua sub-league. New South Wales rebounded by thrashing Rotorua 39–13. They then defeated New Zealand 18–10 in an unofficial "Test" at the Auckland Domain in front of around 15,000. After this result, the second scheduled "Test" was replaced with a second match against Auckland, which was won 25–2 by New South Wales at the Domain in front of 16,000. New South Wales played in three more matches at the end of the tour, including a defeat of Canterbury. The New Zealand side for that match was: George Bradley, Rukingi Reke, Bill Kelly, Henry Duvall, Graham Cook, Billy Curran, Charles Webb (c), Cecil King, Morgan Hayward, Harold Hayward, Jim Rukutai, Bob Mitchell and Charles Dunning.

Former All Golds Billy Wynyard and Jim Gleeson both sat on the New Zealand Rugby League council.

== National competitions ==
=== Northern Union Cup ===
Auckland again held the Northern Union Cup at the end of the season. They defeated the Hawke's Bay at Victoria Park on 27 July.

=== Inter-district competition ===
- Auckland included Don Kenealy, Stan Weston, Arthur Carlaw, Morgan and Harold Hayward, Charles Dunning, Jim Rukutai, George Seagar, Bob Mitchell and Charles Webb.
- The Hawke's Bay included Henry Duvall, Frank Barclay, Jim Johnson and Con McCarthy.
- Wellington included Les Campbell and Ernie Buckland.
- Canterbury played its first ever match, losing to Wellington 5–4 on 7 September at the Show Grounds before hosting New South Wales and then travelling to play the Hawke's Bay in Napier, where they won 10–8. Included in the Canterbury team was captain Charlie Pearce, Jim Auld, Abbie Shadbolt, Billy Mitchell, Bill Bussell and David McPhail.

== Club competitions ==
=== Auckland ===
Newton won the Auckland Rugby League's competition.

A round of club matches were played at Eden Park, after negotiations between the ARL and the Auckland Cricket Board. These were the only club matches of rugby league played at the venue until the New Zealand Warriors played a match there in 2011 and the only rugby league match of any type until 1919.

Charles Savory was sent off in a match for Ponsonby United. He was suspended for the second half of the season, costing him a place on the New Zealand tour of Australia. Ponsonby included: Arthur Carlaw, J Chorley, Charlie Dunning, W Hooper, B Kean, Pip Webb, V Hunter, Tom Lynch, Scotch MacDonald, Harry Oakley, M Stanaway, Syd Riley, Billy Tyler and J Warner.

City included Alex Stanaway, captain G Harrison, Ernie Asher and Bob Mitchell. George Seagar captained the North Shore, who also included Stan Weston, Alfred Jackson, Tom Haddon and William Wynyard. Don Kenealy played for Eden and Jim Rukutai played for Manukau.

The Ellerslie Wanderers were formed at a meeting in April 1912 at the Ellerslie Hotel.

=== Wellington ===
The Wellington Rugby League Association was officially formed on 23 May 1912 at the Trades Hall in Wellington when 1907–08 All Golds captain, Hercules Richard (Bumper) Wright presided over a meeting of 75 footballers and supporters, many of them prominent rugby union players in Wellington.

The founding committee was chaired by W J Riorden and included Daniel Fraser. Four club teams eventually managed to play a series of games during the 1912 season; Petone, Hutt, Athletic and Newtown, with Petone declared the first winners of the Seigel Cup.

=== Other Competitions ===
In an interview with The Press, the NZRL president, D.W. McLean, stated that there were affiliated districts in Thames, Rotorua, Goldfields, and Lower and Upper Waikato. The Hawke's Bay Rugby League had four senior clubs, Whanganui had three and one club existed in Taranaki.

On 13 July the Canterbury Rugby League was formed and later in the month the New Zealand Rugby League accepted its affiliation. The founding committee included William Moyle, Robert Brunsden, Charlie Pearce, David McPhail, A.E. Hooper, who was elected chairman, and president Henry Thacker.
