= 1913 New Zealand rugby league season =

Seasons
- ← 1912 1914 →

The 1913 New Zealand rugby league season was the sixth season of rugby league that had been played in New Zealand.

== International competitions ==
New Zealand toured Australia losing their first three matches to New South Wales before defeating them 17–11 in the final match. New Zealand then defeated Queensland 39–5, Ipswich 29–12 and Toowoomba 32–6. They also played matches against Northern NSW and Orange. Henry Thacker was the manager of the tour and Harold Hayward was the captain.

New Zealand then hosted a return tour by New South Wales. New South Wales won all eleven matches on tour, including over Canterbury, Auckland and Wellington. New South Wales defeated New Zealand 33–19 in Auckland and 58–19 in Wellington.

== National competitions ==
=== Northern Union Cup ===
Auckland again held the Northern Union Cup at the end of the season. Auckland had defeated Canterbury 48–12 in front of 7,000 fans at Victoria Park in August.

=== Inter-district competition ===
Wellington defeated Auckland 33–18 on 27 September 1913. It was not until 1988 that they were again victorious over an Auckland side. The 1913 side was: A.Anderson, B.Whitley, W.Kelly, A.House (Petone), G.Bradley (Athletic), K.George (Newtown), J.Barber, J.Parker (Petone), J.Spencer, T.Turner, A.Bensmann, L.Campbell (Newtown), W.Wilson (Athletic). Bench: H.McGuire, B.Childs.

Canterbury conducted a northern tour; losing to Auckland 48–12 in a Northern Union Cup challenge, defeating Taranaki 10–9 and losing to Wellington 26–8. The match against Taranaki was Canterbury's first, and last for sixty years. Captain Charlie Pearce and Jim Auld were included in the Canterbury team on tour while Billy Mitchell joined them in the home match against New South Wales.

== Club competitions ==
=== Auckland ===
North Shore won the Auckland Rugby League's competition.

Charles Savory was found guilty of kicking by the ARL judiciary and was suspended for life. Savory claimed it was a case of mistaken identity. This sparked a feud between the ARL and the New Zealand Rugby League as the NZRL heard the case and asked the ARL to reconsider, which they refused to do in June. The NZRL then quashed the conviction and Savory played for New Zealand while he was still suspended by the ARL. The NZRL then suspended the entire ARL board and on 15 January 1914 the NZRL approved an entirely "new" ARL board.

=== Wellington ===
Petone won the Wellington Rugby League's Appleton Shield.

Bill Kelly, Billy Wilson and George Bradley played for Athletic while James Barber, Jim Parker and Albert House played for Petone and John Spencer and Les Campbell played for Newtown.

=== Canterbury ===
Sydenham won the Canterbury Rugby League's inaugural competition over twelve rounds. Dr Henry Thacker donated the Thacker Shield during the season.

The Thacker Shield was first contested on 6 September. Sydenham successfully defended the shield against the North Shore, winning 13–8.

Addington was founded on 31 January 1913, Sydenham one week later on 7 February, Linwood on 12 March and on 14 March St. Albans was formed. Charlie Pearce played for Addington and served on their committee. Jim Auld, Bill King and David McPhail were involved with Sydenham while Abbie Shadbolt and Billy Mitchell played for St Albans and Joseph Lavery played for Linwood.
