= 1914 New Zealand rugby league season =

Seasons
- ← 1913 1915 →

The 1914 New Zealand rugby league season was the seventh season of rugby league that had been played in New Zealand.

== International competitions ==
New Zealand hosted the touring Great Britain Lions, losing the Test match 13–16. The New Zealand team was; Arthur Hardgrave, Stan Weston, Karl Ifwersen, George Bradley (c), Billy Wilson, Frank Barclay, Bill Bussell, Charles Savory, Ernest Button, Jim Parker, Vic Banks, Bob Mitchell and Stan Walters. Wilson scored two tries, Banks scored one and Ifwersen kicked two goals.

Great Britain defeated Auckland 34–12 in front of 14,000. The gate earned Auckland Rugby League £650. The Auckland team was; Tom Cross (Ponsonby), Charles Woolley (City), Karl Ifwersen (Grafton), Edward Fox (North Shore), Thomas McClymont (Ponsonby), Arthur Hardgrave (Otahuhu), Charles Webb (Ponsonby), Charles Savory (Ponsonby), J Bennett (Newton), Stan Walters (North Shore), Bob Mitchell (Grafton), Harold Hayward (Thames) and Jim Clark (Ponsonby).

== National competitions ==
=== Northern Union Cup ===
Auckland again held the Northern Union Cup at the end of the season.

=== Inter-district competition ===
Bill Bussell captained Canterbury. Canterbury lost to Wellington 3–13 at the Show Grounds before defeating Hawke's Bay 25–8 at the same venue.

== Club competitions ==
=== Auckland ===
North Shore won the Auckland Rugby League's competition.

Charles Woolley played for City, Karl Ifwersen and Bob Mitchell played for Grafton, Thomas McClymont, Jim Clark, Charles Webb and Charles Savory represented Ponsonby United while Arthur Hardgrave played for Otahuhu and Stan Walters played for the North Shore.

Arthur Myers was elected the Auckland Rugby League president. He served in this role until his death in 1926.

=== Wellington ===
Suburbs won the Wellington Rugby League's Appleton Shield.

=== Canterbury ===
Sydenham won the Canterbury Rugby League's competition, for which they were awarded the Thacker Shield.

Two new clubs joined the Canterbury Rugby League; City joined the senior competition while Federal only produced junior teams. Ernest Button played for City in their only season in the senior competition. Bill Bussell played for Sydenham and Billy Mitchell played for St Albans.

At the end of August the Show Grounds were handed over to the Defence Department.
