= 1920 New Zealand rugby league season =

Seasons
- 1919 1921

The 1920 New Zealand rugby league season was the 13th season of rugby league that had been played in New Zealand.

== International competitions ==
New Zealand lost a series to Great Britain 0–3, the third test being played in Auckland. The New Zealand squad included Bill Davidson, Jim Sanders, Charles Woolley, Karl Ifwersen, Eric Grey, Thomas McClymont, Mike Pollock, Stan Walters (c), Wally Somers, Bill Stormont, Ernie Herring, Bert Avery, Nelson Bass, Bill Scott, Norm Loveridge, Bill Guiney, Charles Woolley, Billy Mitchell, Clarrie Polson, Eric Bennett and Stan Dobson.

Auckland defeated Great Britain for the first time, winning 24–16 on 24 July and becoming the first New Zealand team to defeat Great Britain on New Zealand soil. Auckland included Bill Davidson, Bill Cloke, Karl Ifwersen, Eric Grey, Charles Woolley, Ivan Stewart, Clarrie Polson, Stan Walters, Wally Somers, Bill Stormont, Bert Avery, Jack Wilson (Lower Waikato) and Nelson Bass. Reserves: Thomas McClymont, Norm Loveridge, Ernie Herring and George Paki. Both Auckland matches were played in front of crowds approaching 40,000 in Auckland Domain, which represented New Zealand sporting attendance records at this time. Lancaster Park hosted two matches of the tour. 5,000 fans saw New Zealand lose 3–19 to Great Britain and Canterbury also lost 14–29 at the same venue.

The New Zealand Rugby League awarded life memberships to twelve members, including Henry Thacker, Duncan McGregor and Charlie Pearce.

== National competitions ==
=== Northern Union Cup ===
Auckland again held the Northern Union Cup at the end of the season.

=== Inter-district competition ===
Canterbury included Abbie Shadbolt and Billy Mitchell.

== Club competitions ==
=== Auckland ===
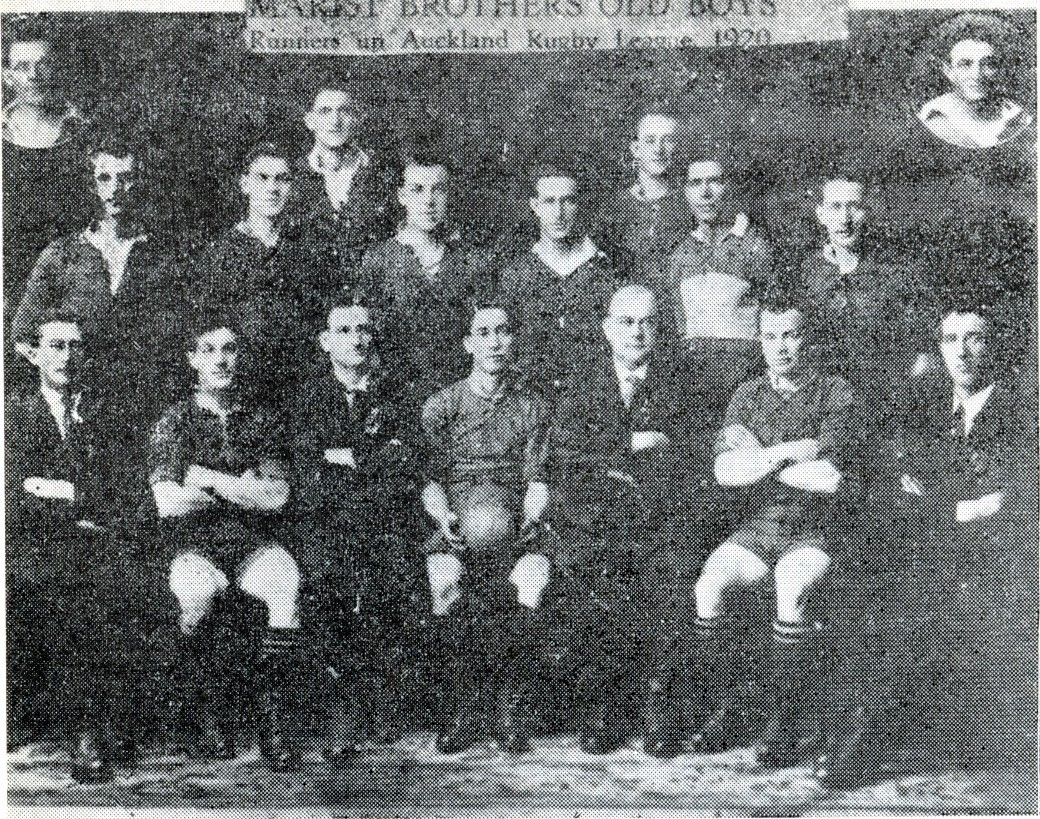
Marist in 1920

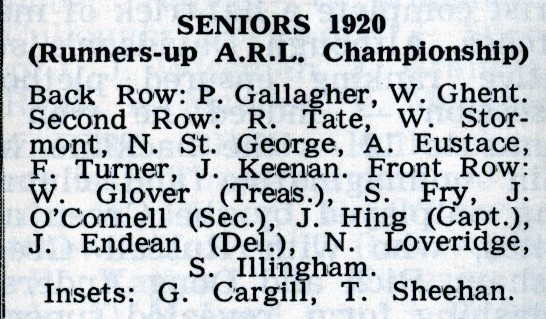

Maritime won the Auckland Rugby League's competition. The Marist Brothers finished second in only their second year in the competition. Newton won the Roope Rooster. Ponsonby United successfully defended the Thacker Shield, defeating Federal from Canterbury 29–19.

The Point Chevalier club was founded in 1920.

The Auckland Rugby League purchased Carlaw Park in 1920 under the chairmanship of James Carlaw.

Marist included Neville St George, Bill Stormont and Norm Loveridge.

=== Wellington ===
Petone won the Wellington Rugby League's Appleton Shield.

=== Canterbury ===
Federal won the Canterbury Rugby League's McKeon Cup.

The McKeon Cup was donated during the season.
