= 1915 New Zealand rugby league season =

Seasons
- ← 1914 1916 →

The 1915 New Zealand rugby league season was the eighth season of rugby league that had been played in New Zealand.

== International competitions ==
New Zealand did not play any international matches in 1915.

== National competitions ==
=== Northern Union Cup ===
Auckland again held the Northern Union Cup at the end of the season.

=== Inter-district competition ===
Canterbury toured the West Coast, defeating West Coast 30–16 on 3 June at Victoria Park, Greymouth. That night the West Coast Rugby League was formed. Canterbury then played Blackball the next day, winning 23–10 before defeating Hokitika 33–8 on 5 June.

- The team for Canterbury was; F. King, J.A. Lavery, G. Ashton, V. Boon, W.J. Mitchell, C. Manning, F. Matthews, F. Kirton, W.H. King, R. Shanks, S. Trudgeon, V. Timmins, W. Burnsden.
- The team for the West Coast was; H. Lawrence, L. Smith, L. Hunter, A. Hobson, W. Kirk, Hay, R. Watts, J. Rear, S. Bligh, A. Kells, D. McCann, T. Todd, J. Stenhouse.

== Club competitions ==
=== Auckland ===
Grafton won the Auckland Rugby League's competition. North Shore won the Roope Rooster. Grafton included Karl Ifwersen.

=== Wellington ===
City won the Wellington Rugby League's Appleton Shield.

=== Canterbury ===
Sydenham won the Canterbury Rugby League's competition. Federal and Northern Suburbs played in their first seasons in the first grade while City left the competition. Northern Suburbs had evolved from the St Albans club.

Hornby FC was founded in March and competed in the junior grades.

Sydenham defended the Thacker Shield against Athletic from Wellington and won 38–6.

=== Other competitions ===
The West Coast Rugby League was formed on 3 June, after Canterbury and West Coast played each other earlier in the day.

On 14 June Kohinoor left the West Coast Rugby Union and two days later, on the 16th, they started the senior club competition with Blackball and Hokitika. The Grey club was added on 6 July.

The West Coast Rugby League went into recess at the end of the year, until being revived in 1919 by J.D.Wingham.
