= 1909 New Zealand rugby league tour of Australia =

The 1909 New Zealand rugby league tour of Australia was a tour by the New Zealand national rugby league team. The New Zealand national rugby league team lost to Australia 1-2 in the three match test series.

== Background ==
Following the pioneering 1907-08 All Golds tour, rugby league was developing in both New Zealand and Australia. A successful 1908 New Zealand Māori rugby league tour of Australia had taken place and helped the NSWRFL establish itself in Sydney. This tour, the second by a New Zealand national side, took place during the 1909 NSWRFL season.

== Squad ==
The team was managed by Daniel Fraser while James Barber captained the side. Albert Asher was invited to tour with the side but declined, opting to remain in Auckland and organise the upcoming Māori tour of Australia. Charlie Pearce and Daniel Gilchrist were also named but withdrew. The full squad was;

- James Barber: Tour captain, played in all 3 tests on tour. Barber had been bought into the All Golds for the 1908 Australian leg and had since been involved in rugby league in Wellington.
- William Trevarthen: 3 tests. A 1907-08 All Gold, Trevarthen was part of the Auckland side. After the tour he accepted a contract with Huddersfield.
- Adam Lile: 3 tests. A 1907-08 All Gold, Lile was instrumental in developing rugby league in Taranaki.
- Conrad Byrne: 3 tests, 5 points. A 1907-08 All Gold, Byrne served as test captain during the tour and later joined North Sydney in 1910.
- Harold Rowe: 3 tests, 5 points. A 1907-08 All Gold, Rowe signed with Leeds in September 1909.
- George Spencer: 1 test. A former All Black, Spencer had switched codes in 1908.
- John Spencer: 3 tests. Brother of George and another former All Black, the Spencer's are the only brothers to represent both the All Blacks and the Kiwis.
- Con Sullivan: 1 test. Sullivan broke his leg on the tour. He would later play for North Sydney and represent New South Wales, Australia and Australasia.
- Charlie Pearce: A 1907-08 All Gold, Pearce later represented both Wellington and Canterbury.
- Ernie Buckland: 3 tests. Part of the Taranaki Rugby League Team of the Century (1908–2008).
- Arthur Carlaw: 2 tests. From the Ponsonby United club in Auckland, Carlaw Park was named after his brother, James.
- Paddy George: From Wellington.
- Gordon Hooker: 2 tests. Part of the Taranaki Rugby League Team of the Century (1908–2008).
- Thomas Houghton: 1 test. Born in England, Houghton had earlier played for St Helens R.F.C. and Liverpool City.
- Albert House: 3 tests, 4 points. From Wellington.
- Bert King: 3 tests, 9 points. From Wellington.
- Henry Knight: 2 tests. From Wellington.
- Ronald MacDonald: 3 tests, 3 points. From Auckland.

== Fixtures ==
Date	Opponent	Venue	Result	Score	Attendance	Report
5 June 1909	New South Wales	Sydney	Loss	21-26		
June 1909	New South Wales	Sydney	Loss	20-27		
12 June 1909	Australia	Royal Agricultural Society Showground, Sydney	Won	19-11	7,000	
June 1909	Newcastle	Newcastle	Won			
June 1909	Queensland	Brisbane	Won			
June 1909	Queensland	Brisbane	Won			
26 June 1909	Australia	Brisbane Exhibition Ground, Brisbane	Loss	5-10	6,000	
3 July 1909	Australia	Royal Agricultural Society Showground, Sydney	Loss	5-25	6,500	

Henry Knight and Billy Cann were sent off by referee Charles Hutchinson in the second half after an altercation. The two shook hands as they left the field. It was the last test between Australia and New Zealand on Australian soil until 1948

The Australians were awarded the Black and White Challenge Cup for winning the series and the New Zealanders left Australia on the steamer Ulimaroa the same day.
