= 1917 New Zealand rugby league season =

Seasons
- ← 1916 1918 →

The 1917 New Zealand rugby league season was the tenth season of rugby league that had been played in New Zealand.

== International competitions ==
New Zealand played in no international matches in 1917.

== National competitions ==
=== Northern Union Cup ===
Auckland again held the Northern Union Cup at the end of the season.

== Club competitions ==
=== Auckland ===
Ponsonby United won the Auckland Rugby League's competition and the Roope Rooster.

The Auckland Rugby Union champions, Railway (themselves a War time combination of the Marist and City clubs), split with a breakaway group led by Conrad McDevitt challenging Ponsonby United to a game of rugby league. Railway XIII, who included most of the club's leading players, defeated Ponsonby United 12–3 at the Auckland Domain. They then lost to the City Rovers 6–18. Railway XIII included Ces Dacre, who later represented New Zealand at cricket. In 1918 the club merged with Grafton Athletic. McDevitt was later involved in the formation of the Marist club in 1919.

=== Canterbury ===
Sydenham won the Canterbury Rugby League's competition, for which they were awarded the Thacker Shield.

Federal, Hornby, Linwood and Sydenham were the only senior teams.

During the year former Canterbury captain and New Zealand international Bill Bussell was killed in action.

=== Other Competitions ===
The Wellington Rugby League's competition was suspended from 1916 until 1918.
