= 1921 New Zealand rugby league season =

Seasons
- ← 1920 1922 →

The 1921 New Zealand rugby league season was the 14th season of rugby league that had been played in New Zealand.

== International competitions ==
New Zealand toured Australia, losing to New South Wales 56–9. They then defeated Queensland 25–12 before losing the second and third matches 21–16 and 8–3 respectively. The final three matches of the tour saw a loss to Toowoomba and wins over Wide Bay and Newcastle. New Zealand were coached by Jim Rukutai, captained by Henry Tancred and included Clarrie Polson.

New Zealand also provided one player to the Australasian tour of Great Britain; Bert Laing. On their way to Great Britain and France the Australasian Kangaroos played an exhibition match at the Basin Reserve in Wellington.

== National competitions ==
=== Northern Union Cup ===
Auckland again held the Northern Union Cup at the end of the season.

=== Inter-district competition ===
Auckland toured the country, defeating Wellington 23–21, the West Coast 47–7 and Canterbury 39–14. Auckland included; Bill Stormont, Bill Davidson, captain Maurice Wetherill, Tim Peckham and Alf Townsend.

A second Auckland side, including Bert Avery, defeated King Country 58–25 in Auckland while a third Auckland side lost 15–18 to the Hawke's Bay.

== Club competitions ==
=== Auckland ===
City won the Auckland Rugby League's Monteith Shield and the Roope Rooster.

Carlaw Park was officially opened on 25 June. The City Rovers defeated Maritime 10–8 in front of 7,000 fans on opening day.

Ponsonby United successfully defended the Thacker Shield, defeating Petone from Wellington 21–13. They then accepted a challenge from Auckland City club, and lost the trophy to City. Sydenham had also challenged for the trophy but had been told that there was no suitable date. The Canterbury Rugby League, and their President Henry Thacker, challenged this decision and the New Zealand Rugby League stepped in, returning the trophy to Canterbury. The rules were subsequently amended to make the shield only contestable between South Island clubs.

City included Bill Davidson, Maurice Wetherill, Bert Laing, George Paki, Tim Peckham and Alf Townsend. Maritime included Ivan Littlewood, Eric Grey and Stan Webb.

=== Wellington ===
Hutt won the Wellington Rugby League's Appleton Shield.

=== Canterbury ===
Federal won the Canterbury Rugby League's McKeon Cup.

=== Other competitions ===
The South Auckland Rugby League was constituted on 28 April 1921.
