= 1923 New Zealand rugby league season =

Seasons
- 1922 1924

The 1923 New Zealand rugby league season was the 16th season of rugby league that had been played in New Zealand.

== International competitions ==
New Zealand played in no international matches during the season.

Huatahi Paki played 15 games for the St. George Dragons during the season.

== National competitions ==
=== Northern Union Cup ===
South Auckland again held the Northern Union Cup at the end of the season. During the season they had drawn 20-all with Auckland in Hamilton.

=== Inter-district competition ===
The West Coast defeated Wellington 12–6 in their first ever win.

== Club competitions ==
=== Auckland ===
The City Rovers won the Auckland Rugby League's competition for a third year in a row. City defeated Grafton 8–7 in the championship cup final. Ponsonby won the Roope Rooster.

Lou Brown played for Newtown while City included Maurice Wetherill, Hec McDonald, Ben Davidson and captain Bill Davidson.

=== Wellington ===
Hutt won the Wellington Rugby League's Appleton Shield.

=== Canterbury ===
Addington won the Canterbury Rugby League's McKeon Cup. Hornby won the Thacker Shield.

Kaiapoi played in the senior competition for the first time.
