= Robin Strong =

New Zealand international rugby league footballer

Personal information
- Full name: Robin Maxwell Strong
- Born: 9 February 1944 (age 81); Picton, Marlborough Region, New Zealand

Playing information
- Height: 6 ft 2 in (1.88 m)
- Weight: 14 st 0 lb (89 kg)
- Position: Centre
Club
Years	Team	Pld	T	G	FG	P
1954–69	Waiwhetu
Representative
Years	Team	Pld	T	G	FG	P
≤1963–≥68	Wellington
1965	New Zealand	8	3	0	0	9

Robin Maxwell Strong (born 9 February 1944) is a New Zealand former professional rugby league footballer who played in the 1950s and 1960s. He played at representative level for New Zealand, and Wellington, as a centre. He has lived in the USA since 1969.

== Playing career ==
=== Representative career ===
Strong represented the New Zealand on the 1965 New Zealand rugby league tour of Great Britain and France.
