= Walter Miller (rugby league) =

New Zealand international rugby league footballer

Personal information
- Full name: Walter Miller
- Born: 1887
- Died: Deceased

Playing information
- Position: Fullback
Representative
Years	Team	Pld	T	G	FG	P
≤1913–≥13	Wellington
1913	New Zealand	0	0	0	0	0

Walter Miller was a New Zealand professional rugby league footballer who played in the 1910s. He played at representative level for New Zealand, and Wellington, as a fullback.

== Playing career ==
Miller represented New Zealand on their 1913 tour of Australia.
