= Albert House =

NZ international rugby league footballer & referee

Personal information
- Full name: Albert Phillip House
- Born: 1890 Buninyong, Victoria, Australia
- Died: 29 May 1966 (aged 76)

Playing information

Rugby union
Representative
Years	Team	Pld	T	G	FG	P
≤1908–08	Wellington

Rugby league
- Position: Fullback, Centre, Stand-off
Club
Years	Team	Pld	T	G	FG	P
1912–13	Petone
Representative
Years	Team	Pld	T	G	FG	P
1908–13	Wellington
1909–13	New Zealand	3	0	2	0	4

Refereeing information
Years	Competition	Apps
1919–20	Internationals	2

Albert Phillip House (1890 – 29 May 1966) was a New Zealand rugby union and professional rugby league footballer who played in the 1900s and 1910s, and rugby league referee of the 1910s and 1920s . He played representative level rugby union for Wellington, and representative level rugby league for New Zealand, and Wellington, and at club level for Petone, as a fullback or stand-off.

== Playing career ==
House originally played rugby union, representing Wellington.

In 1908 House switched to rugby league, playing for Wellington in the first provincial matches, against Auckland.

House won caps for New Zealand in the 1909 tour of Australia, playing Fullback, and scoring two conversions in New Zealand's 19–11 victory over Australia at Royal Agricultural Society Showground, Sydney on Saturday 12 June 1909, playing Fullback in the 5–10 defeat by Australia at Brisbane Exhibition Ground, Brisbane on Saturday 26 June 1909, and Stand-off (George Spencer playing Fullback) in the 5–25 defeat by Australia at Royal Agricultural Society Showground, Sydney on Saturday 3 July 1909.

In 1912 House was part of the Petone side in the inaugural Wellington Rugby League competition. Petone were the first winners of the Siegal Cup.

House played Centre, i.e. number 4 in Wellington's 33–18 victory over Auckland during the 1913 New Zealand rugby league season Inter-district competition on Saturday 27 September 1913, this would be Wellington's last victory against Auckland until 1988. He again played for New Zealand, against New South Wales, that year.

== Refereeing career ==
House later became a rugby league referee. In 1919 he became the first, of only four Kiwis test players, to referee a test match when the Kiwis played Australia at the Basin Reserve.

== Death ==
House died in 1966 and was buried at Karori Cemetery in Wellington.

== Honoured at Petone Panthers ==
House was named as the Fullback in the Petone Panthers' Team of the Century in 2012.
