= Charles Brown (rugby union, born 1887) =

Charlie Brown
- Born: Charles Brown; 19 December 1887 New Plymouth, New Zealand
- Died: 2 April 1966 (aged 78) New Plymouth, New Zealand
- Height: 1.68 m (5 ft 6 in)
- Weight: 72 kg (158 lb)

Rugby union career
- Position: Halfback
Provincial / State sides
Years	Team	Apps	(Points)
1909–22	Taranaki	53	
International career
Years	Team	Apps	(Points)
1913, 1920	New Zealand	2	(3)

Charles Brown (19 December 1887 – 2 April 1966) was a New Zealand rugby union player. A halfback, Brown represented Taranaki at a provincial level, and was a member of the New Zealand national side, the All Blacks, in 1913 and 1920. He played nine matches for the All Blacks including two internationals.

During World War I, Brown served with the Field Engineers as part of the New Zealand Expeditionary Force. He played for the New Zealand Division team that won the Somme Cup in 1917 and, after the end of the war, for the New Zealand services team that toured Britain and South Africa.

Brown went on to coach at club level at Taranaki, and served as a Taranaki selector in 1925 and from 1932 to 1946, a North Island selector between 1947 and 1948, and also as a national selector. He was also a member of the management committee of the Taranaki Rugby Union from 1940 to 1950.

Brown died at New Plymouth on 2 April 1966, and was buried at Awanui Cemetery.
