= 1922 New Zealand rugby league season =

Seasons
- ← 1921 1923 →

The 1922 New Zealand rugby league season was the 15th season of rugby league that had been played in New Zealand.

== International competitions ==
New Zealand hosted New South Wales. New South Wales won all six matches on tour. The defeated Auckland 40–25 at the Auckland Domain and then 21–20 four days later in the return game. The Auckland side included; Craddock Dufty, captain Bert Laing, Ivan Littlewood, Wally Somers, Frank Delgrosso, Clarrie Polson, W Hanlon, Nelson Bass, H Douglas, George Davidson, H Hawkes, Bert Avery and Maurice Wetherill. Lou Brown made his Auckland debut in the second match.

At the end of the tour the NSW members of the 1921–22 Australasian Kangaroos were joined by New Zealand member Bert Laing for a match against the rest of the NSW squad and local Auckland stars. The Kangaroos won 65–27.

The New Zealand Māori side played Sydney Metropolis in Sydney.

== National competitions ==
=== Northern Union Cup ===
South Auckland held the Northern Union Cup at the end of the season. They defeated Auckland 21–20 in Auckland to win the trophy and then defeated them 28–16 in Hamilton to keep it.

South Auckland included Brownie Paki and Wilson Hall while Auckland included Clarrie Polson.

== Club competitions ==
=== Auckland ===
City won the Auckland Rugby League's competition. Ponsonby won the Roope Rooster.

Lou Brown played for Newtown.

=== Wellington ===
Petone won the Wellington Rugby League's Appleton Shield.

=== Canterbury ===
Sydenham won the Canterbury Rugby League's McKeon Cup.

Waimairi and Ouruhia affiliated in 1922. Waimairi was renamed Papanui after World War Two.
