= Charles Manning (rugby league) =

New Zealand international rugby player

Personal information
- Born: c.1890 New Zealand
- Died: 7 May 1967 (aged 76–77)

Playing information
- Weight: 85.73 kg (13 st 7.0 lb)
- Position: Centre, Stand-off
Club
Years	Team	Pld	T	G	FG	P
1912–14	Ahuriri	10	9	0	0	27
1915	Addington	10	3	2	0	13
	Total	20	12	2	0	40
Representative
Years	Team	Pld	T	G	FG	P
1912–14	Hawke's Bay	6	3	1	0	11
1914	Hawke's Bay Trial	1	1	0	0	3
1915	Canterbury	2	2	0	0	6
1913	New Zealand	7	3	0	0	9

Charles Manning was a New Zealand rugby league footballer who played in the 1910s. He played at representative level for New Zealand, Hawke's Bay and Canterbury, as a centre or stand-off.

== Playing career ==
=== Ahuriri, Hawke's Bay, Addington and Canterbury ===
Charles Manning switched codes midway through the 1912 season and joined the Ahuriri side. He scored 4 tries in one of their matches and gained selection late in the season for the Hawke's Bay side to play the touring New South Wales team. In 1913, he only played 1 match for Ahuriri but played twice for Hawke's Bay against Auckland and Poverty Bay. He also played for New Zealand against the touring New South Wales side on 6 September. In 1914, he played 6 times for Ahuriri, and three times for Hawke's Bay. Two of these matches were against Wellington while the other was against the touring England side.

In 1915, he began playing for the Addington club in Christchurch. He went on tour with Canterbury to the West Coast where three matches were played. He played in the first against Greymouth and the third against Hokitika, while refereeing their second match. He scored two tries in the win over Greymouth.

== International honours ==
Manning represented New Zealand in 1913 on their tour of Australia. He played 5 games and scored 3 tries on the tour. He then played for New Zealand against the touring New South Wales side.
