= 1913 New Zealand rugby league tour of Australia =

The 1913 New Zealand rugby league tour of Australia was a tour by the New Zealand national rugby league team.

This was the first New Zealand side to wear the kiwi and silver fern emblem on their playing jersey.

== Squad ==
The touring party included, backs; Albert Asher, George Bradley, Arthur Carlaw, Henry Duvall, Karl Ifwersen, Alfred Jackson, Bill Kelly (vice captain), Charles Manning, Walter Miller, Billy Mitchell, Roy Proebstel, Rukingi Reke and forwards; Jim Auld, Conrad Byrne, Les Campbell, Jim Clark, Harold Hayward (captain), John Hogan, Cecil King, Bob Mitchell, Abbie Shadbolt and Stan Walters.

Percy Williams, who was contracted to Wigan, joined the squad mid-way through the tour.

They were managed by A.W.S. Brice and Henry Thacker and accompanied by Thacker's wife, Monica.

Four original selections withdrew from the side; Charlie Pearce, Jim Rukutai, Charles Savory and Charles Webb.

== Fixtures ==
Date	Opponent	Venue	Result	Score	Attendance	Report
	New South Wales	Sydney	Loss	15-17	35,000	
	New South Wales	Sydney	Loss	12-31		
	Newcastle	Newcastle	Loss	17-40		
	Queensland	Brisbane Cricket Ground, Brisbane	Win	39-5		
	Queensland	Brisbane Cricket Ground, Brisbane	Win	32-6		
	New South Wales	Sydney	Win	17-11		
	New South Wales	Sydney	Loss	10-34		

On their return home, New Zealand defeated Canterbury 32–5, with Auld and Shadbolt playing for their home district.
