= Roy Proebstel =

NZ international rugby league footballer

Personal information
- Full name: Leroy Lewis Proebstel
- Born: 10 April 1893; Conconully, Washington, United States
- Died: 3 March 1963 (aged 69); Fresno, California, United States

Playing information
- Position: Wing
Club
Years	Team	Pld	T	G	FG	P
1913–14	Petone	6	2	2	0	10
Representative
Years	Team	Pld	T	G	FG	P
1913	Wellington Trial	1	0	0	0	0
1913–14	Wellington	3	1	0	0	3
1913	New Zealand	7	3	0	0	9

Leroy "Roy" Lewis Proebstel (10 April 1893 – 3 March 1963) was a New Zealand professional rugby league footballer who played in the 1910s. He played at representative level for New Zealand, and Wellington, as a wing.

== Early years ==
Proebstel was born in Conconully, Washington and moved to New Zealand when he was seven.

== Playing career ==
Proebstel represented New Zealand on the 1913 tour of Australia.

== Legacy ==
Proebstel was named as the wing in the Petone Panthers' Team of the Century in 2012.
