= 1916 in sports =

Note — many sporting events did not take place because of World War I

1916 in sports describes the year's events in world sport.

== American football ==
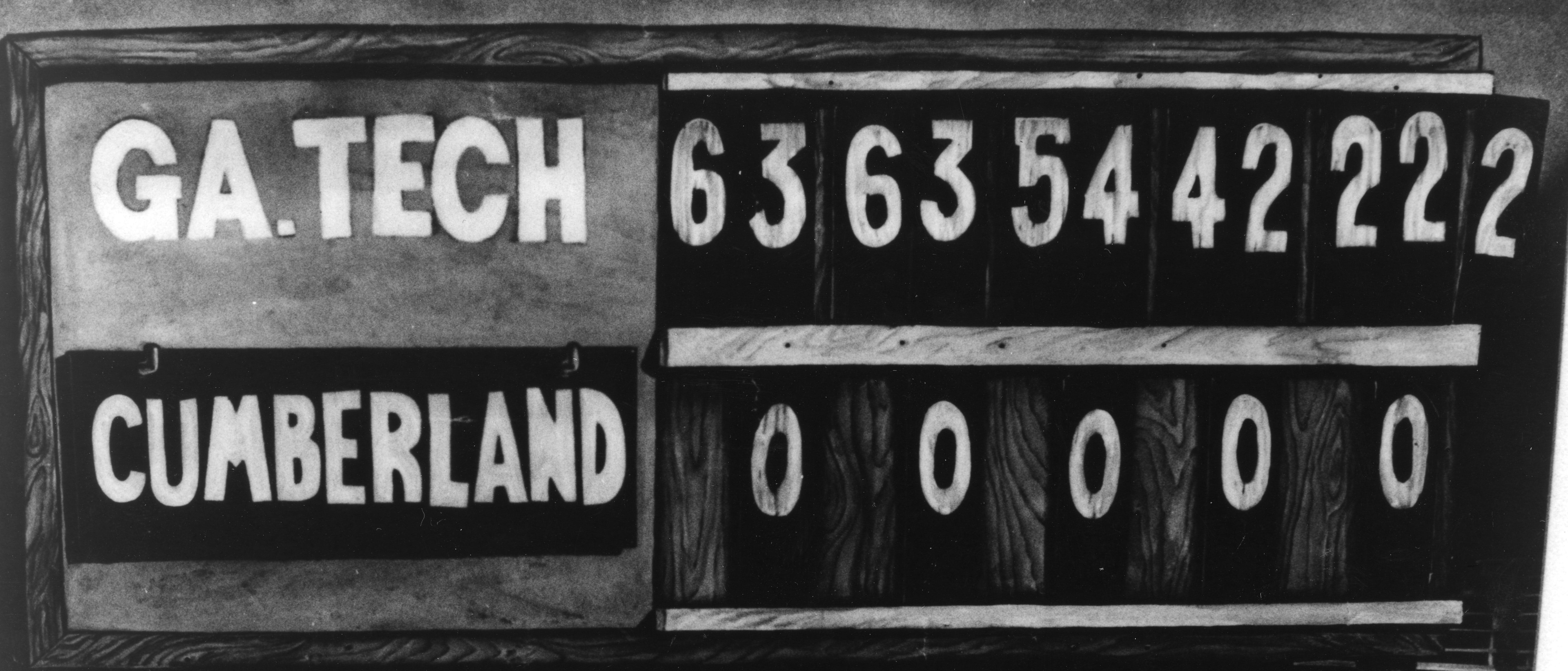
Final score of the 1916 Cumberland vs. Georgia Tech football game

College championship

- College football national championship – Pittsburgh Panthers

Events

- 7 October — Georgia Tech Yellow Jackets defeats the Cumberland University Bulldogs by a score of 222–0, the most one-sided game in college football history.

== Association football ==
Europe

- There is no major football in Europe due to World War I

South America

- 9 July — CONMEBOL, the governing body of South American football, is founded

== Australian rules football ==
VFL Premiership

- 2 September: Fitzroy wins the 20th VFL Premiership: Fitzroy 12.13 (85) d Carlton 8.8 (56) at Melbourne Cricket Ground (MCG). Fitzroy wins the title despite having finished last in the regular season.

South Australian Football League:

- not contested due to World War I

West Australian Football League:

- 9 September: South Fremantle 7.12 (54) defeat East Fremantle 5.5 (35) for their first WAFL premiership.

== Bandy ==
Sweden

- Championship final – IFK Uppsala 3–2 Djurgårdens IF

== Baseball ==
World Series

- 7–12 October — Boston Red Sox defeats the Brooklyn Robins by 4 games to 1 to win the 1916 World Series.

Events

- The Philadelphia Athletics finish the season with a record of 36–117 or a .235 winning percentage, the worst Major League Baseball record since 1900.
- Winnipeg Maroons wins the Northern League Championship
- The Federal League goes out of business in a settlement with organised baseball that leaves out one club; the Baltimore Terrapins pursue a legal remedy

== Boxing ==
Events

- Having already lost to him earlier in the year, Battling Levinsky defeats Jack Dillon in 12 rounds at Boston to claim the World Light Heavyweight Championship.
- The series of fights between Ted "Kid" Lewis and Jack Britton continues with Britton taking the World Welterweight Championship into 1917.

Lineal world champions

- World Heavyweight Championship – Jess Willard
- World Light Heavyweight Championship – Jack Dillon → Battling Levinsky
- World Middleweight Championship – Al McCoy
- World Welterweight Championship – Ted "Kid" Lewis → Jack Britton
- World Lightweight Championship – Freddie Welsh
- World Featherweight Championship – Johnny Kilbane
- World Bantamweight Championship – Kid Williams
- World Flyweight Championship – Jimmy Wilde

== Canadian football ==
Grey Cup

- not contested due to World War I

== Cricket ==
Events

- There is no first-class cricket in England, Australia, New Zealand, South Africa or the West Indies due to World War I

India

- Bombay Quadrangular – Europeans

== Cycling ==
Tour de France

- not contested due to World War I

Giro d'Italia

- not contested due to World War I

== Figure skating ==
World Figure Skating Championships

- not contested due to World War I

== Golf ==
Events

- The inaugural USPGA Championship is held as a matchplay tournament

Major tournaments

- British Open – not contested due to World War I
- June 29–30 — US Open – Chick Evans
- October 10–14 — USPGA Championship – Jim Barnes

Other tournaments

- British Amateur – not contested due to World War I
- US Amateur – Chick Evans

== Horse racing ==
England

- Grand National – not held due to World War I
- 1,000 Guineas Stakes – Canyon
- 2,000 Guineas Stakes – Clarissimus
- The Derby – Fifinella
- The Oaks – Fifinella
- St. Leger Stakes – Hurry On

Australia

- Melbourne Cup – Sasanof

Canada

- King's Plate - Mandarin

Ireland

- Irish Grand National – All Sorts
- Irish Derby Stakes – Furore

USA

- May 13 — Kentucky Derby – George Smith
- Preakness Stakes – Damrosch
- Belmont Stakes – Friar Rock

== Ice hockey ==
Stanley Cup

- Montreal Canadiens wins the National Hockey Association (NHA) championship
- Portland Rosebuds wins the Pacific Coast Hockey Association (PCHA) championship, the first United States team to do so
- 20–30 March — Montreal Canadiens defeats Portland Rosebuds in the 1916 Stanley Cup Final by 3 games to 2

Events

- Winnipeg 61st Battalion wins the Allan Cup

== Olympic Games ==
1916 Summer Olympics

- The 1916 Summer Olympics, due to take place in Berlin, are cancelled due to World War I

== Rowing ==
The Boat Race

- Oxford and Cambridge Boat Race – not contested due to World War I

== Rugby league ==
England

- All first-class competitions are cancelled due to World War I

Australia

- NSW Premiership – Balmain 5–3 South Sydney (grand final)

New Zealand

- 1916 New Zealand rugby league season

== Rugby union ==
Five Nations Championship

- Five Nations Championship series is not contested due to World War I

== Speed skating ==
Speed Skating World Championships

- not contested due to World War I

== Tennis ==
Australia

- Australian Men’s Singles Championship – not contested due to World War I

England

- Wimbledon Men's Singles Championship – not contested due to World War I
- Wimbledon Women's Singles Championship – not contested due to World War I

France

- French Men’s Singles Championship – not contested due to World War I
- French Women’s Singles Championship – not contested due to World War I

USA

- American Men's Singles Championship – Richard Norris Williams (USA) defeats Bill Johnston (USA) 4–6 6–4 0–6 6–2 6–4
- American Women’s Singles Championship – Molla Bjurstedt Mallory (Norway) defeats Louise Hammond Raymond (USA) 6–0 6–1

Davis Cup

- 1916 International Lawn Tennis Challenge – not contested
