= Henry Knight (rugby league) =

New Zealand international rugby league footballer

Personal information
- Full name: Henry Knight

Playing information
- Position: Forward
Representative
Years	Team	Pld	T	G	FG	P
1908–≥08	Wellington
1909	New Zealand	2	0	0	0	0

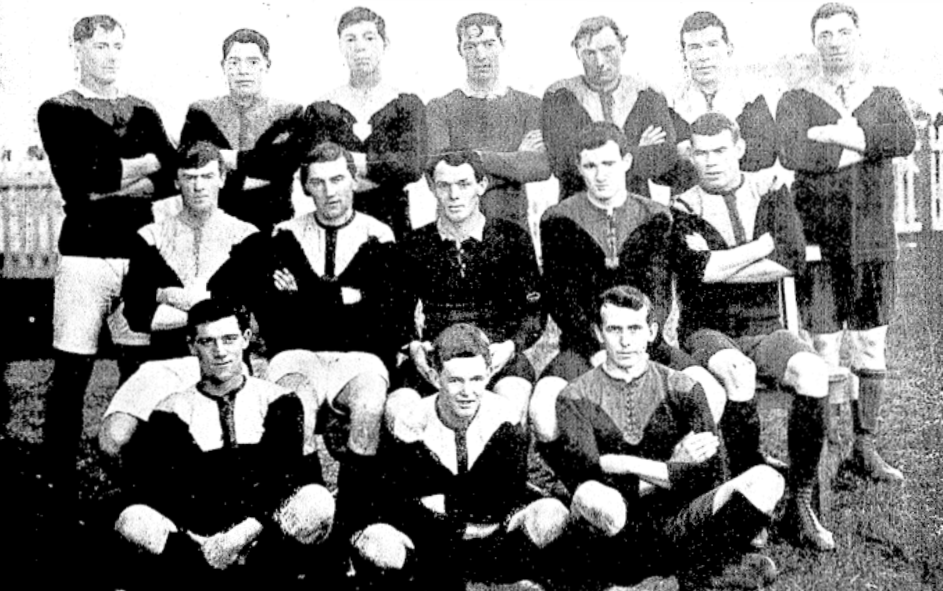
The Petone senior rugby team in 1907 with Knight in the back row, 3rd from the left. Tom Cross (rugby) and Hercules Wright were next to him to the left. James Barber (rugby) was seated on the left in the middle row.

Henry Knight was a New Zealand professional rugby league footballer who played in the 1900s and 1910s. He played at representative level for New Zealand, and Wellington, as a forward.

== International honours ==
Henry Knight won caps for New Zealand in the 1909 New Zealand rugby league tour of Australia, playing as a forward in the 5-10 defeat by Australia at Brisbane Exhibition Ground, Brisbane on Saturday 26 June 1909, and as a forward in the 5-25 defeat by Australia at Royal Agricultural Society Showground, Sydney on Saturday 3 July 1909.
