= Billy Wilson (New Zealand rugby league) =

New Zealand international rugby league footballer

Personal information
- Full name: William Wilson
- Born: 17 May 1889 Timaru, Canterbury Region, New Zealand
- Died: 19 February 1976 (aged 86) Levin, Manawatū–Whanganui, New Zealand

Playing information
- Height: 169 cm (5 ft 7 in)
- Weight: 75 kg (11 st 11 lb)

Rugby union
Club
Years	Team	Pld	T	G	FG	P
1910	Athletic	4	0	0	0	0
Representative
Years	Team	Pld	T	G	FG	P
1910	Wellington B	1	0	0	0	0
1916	Wellington Battalion	4	3	0	0	9
1917	New Zealand Battalion

Rugby league
- Position: Wing, Loose forward
Club
Years	Team	Pld	T	G	FG	P
1912–21	Athletic RLFC	37	26	4	0	87
Representative
Years	Team	Pld	T	G	FG	P
1912–14	Wellington	15	7	0	0	21
1910–14	A Team (Well. Trial)	2	1	0	0	3
1914–21	New Zealand	11 (2)	10 (2)	0	0	33 (6)
1920	Auckland	1	0	0	0	0
- Parents: Joseph William Wilson (father); Tabitha Ann Wilson (mother)
- Relatives: Ranji Wilson (brother)

William Wilson was a New Zealand professional rugby league footballer who played in the 1910s and 1920s. He played at representative level for New Zealand, and Wellington, as a wing or loose forward.

== Family and personal life ==
Billy Wilson was born on 17 May 1889 in Timaru to Tabitha Ann Wilson and Joseph William Wilson. His mother Tabitha was born in Batley, Yorkshire, England while his father Joseph was from the West Indies. Billy had three brothers, Joseph Simman, Nathaniel Arthur, and Charles Leslie, and two sisters, Elizabeth Maria May (Betty), and Ada. He also had a half sister, May Ineson after his mother remarried later in life to Johnathon (Johny) Cooper. His brother Nathaniel Arthur Wilson was better known as Ranji Wilson. He played 21 times for the All Blacks from 1908 to 1914. Billy Wilson was a carpenter by trade. At the time of his enlistment he stated that he was working for Campbell and Burke who ran a construction business in Wellington at the time.

== Playing career ==
=== Rugby union beginnings, Athletic RFC, and Wellington B ===
Billy Wilson began his senior oval ball career playing for the Athletic rugby club in Wellington. He had been a junior there and made his senior debut in a match on 7 May 1910 against Victoria College. He was only to play 4 games for them in total because of an extremely controversial and well publicised incident in 6 August match between Athletic and Poneke. It was alleged that his brother Ranji Wilson had struck Petone player Duilio Calcinai and broken his jaw. The case went to court 3 months later in November and received extensive front page newspaper coverage. Numerous witnesses were called to Ranji Wilson's trial with conflicting descriptions of what had happened and who had struck the blow. The match featured Ranji, Billy, and a third brother Joseph. They were similar looking enough that many witnesses said they couldn't be sure who struck the blow or each named a different brother. Billy said that he knew who struck the blow and when the Wellington Rugby Football Union asked him who it was he refused to answer. The Union then disqualified him from playing permanently at the start of the 1911 season for his failure to cooperate. Prior to the court case Wilson was selected to play for Wellington B in their match with Marlborough. He was considered a surprise selection because he had only played a handful of senior club matches. Wellington B lost the match 6-8.

=== Switch to rugby league, Athletic RL club, and Wellington ===
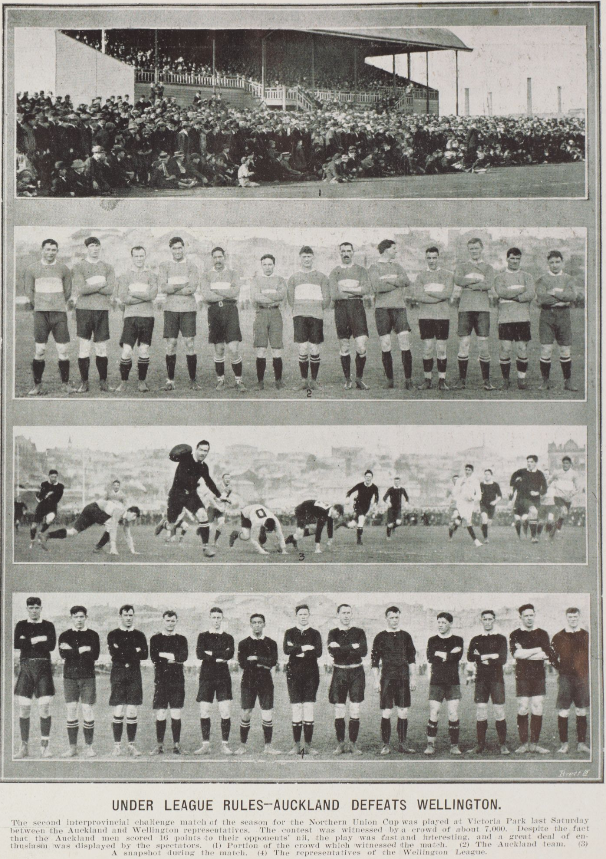
Wilson in the 1912 Wellington side to play Auckland at Victoria Park.

In 1912, after being banned from playing rugby union Billy Wilson made the switch to rugby league where he joined the Athletic club. He had not played any football in the 1911 season. In 1922 when he applied for reinstatement at the end of his career he said to the Wellington Rugby Union that he had just wanted to play football. The Wellington rugby league competition was newly formed in 1912 with the Athletic club's birth in May that year. He played 9 matches for Athletic in their first season, mostly in the forwards but also some in the five eighth position.

At the beginning of the season prior to the club matches starting he played for a Wellington team against a combined Petone and Hutt side, then against Hawke's Bay, which they won 37-24, before a more official Wellington debut match against Nelson on the ground at Duppa Street in Wellington. In August he played against Auckland at Victoria Park in a 16-0 loss. At the end of the season on 7 September he played against Canterbury with Wellington winning 5 to 4.

1913 was a busy season for Wilson as he played 13 matches for Athletic in the second row and loose forward position. He scored 10 tries and kicked a conversion. Then on 9 August he played in a Wellington trial match before being picked to play loose forward against Canterbury. Canterbury won the match 30-29. He then played against Auckland at Victoria Park in Auckland before a crowd of 7,500. Wellington went down narrowly 12-11. Wellington then played Wanganui and won 22-6 before then taking on the touring New South Wales side. They lost the match 34-18 at Newtown Park. Wilson's final match of the season was against Auckland who were on tour. It was a slightly weaker Auckland side which even included their manager due to injuries they had sustained in their match with Taranaki days prior. Wellington ran out winners 33-18 in front of 1,800 spectators. This would be Wellington's last victory against Auckland until 1988.

In 1914 he played 8 matches for Athletic though they had begun to struggle to field a side by the end of the season along with other club teams due to so many players leaving to join the fight in World War I. Wilson had scored 8 tries in those matches where he was now being used more regularly in the backs. On 3 June he played for Wellington against Hawke's Bay in an 18-9 win where he scored a try. He played in a Wellington trial match as they looked to pick their best side for their match with the touring England team. He scored a try for the A Team in their 12-11 win. The match with England was played at Newtown Park with 5,000 spectators present. Wellington were very competitive and only lost 7-14 to a fully professional side. Wilson then scored a try in a match against Canterbury which they won 13-3. He was picked in the New Zealand side to play England a week later. He then played for Wellington against Hawke's Bay and scored 4 tries in a 62-16 thrashing. His last representative match of the season was against Auckland. Auckland won 10-6 and retained the Northern Union Challenge Cup at Victoria Park, Auckland. Soon after this Wilson enlisted in the army to fight in World War I.

In 1919 after Wilson returned from the war he was elected club captain of Athletic. He played 2 matches where he scored 3 tries before he was selected to tour Australia with the New Zealand side. Following the tour he played in 3 more matches for Athletic in August and September. Against Petone B's senior side he ran in 5 tries and kicked a conversion in a 44-0 win. The 1920 season saw him play a very limited amount for Athletic early in the season and no representative football. It is possible that he had moved to Auckland during this season.

=== International honours ===
Billy Wilson was selected for New Zealand in 1914 against Great Britain. The match was played at the Auckland Domain in front of 15,000 on 1 August. Wilson scored two of New Zealand's tries while playing on the left wing. New Zealand went down by the narrow margin of 16-13. His first try came after Jim Parker intercepted a pass and transferred the ball to Karl Ifwersen who sent it on to Wilson who "with a great sprint" scored. Then just before the final whistle Wilson "snapped up the ball and put a fitting climax to a great game by scoring".

In 1919 he was chosen for the New Zealand tour of Australia. He played in 7 of the tour matches and scored 6 tries with all of his appearances on the wing. He played against Auckland for New Zealand prior to their departure. New Zealand won 25 to 19. His first match in Australia was against New South Wales and saw New Zealand lose 23-18. He played against Tamworth on 11 June in a 21-13 win. He was in try scoring form against New South Wales on 21 June, crossing for 3 tries but it wasn't enough to avoid a 22-19 defeat. He scored New Zealand's second try after he beat the tackle of White and after some fumbling play crossed the line. His own second came after receiving a pass from Bill Williams and he ran over for a try. His third try came when Jim Rukutai passed to Stan Walters who passed to Wilson as he was being tackled. Wilson knocked the ball forward with his knee and followed through to regather and score. This gave New Zealand a 19-11 lead but they fell away to lose the match.

His next two games saw a win over Ipswich 11-8 and a loss to Queensland 26-18 on 28 June. His final two matches of the tour were against Rockhampton where he scored twice in a 23-0 win "by fine play". For his first try he received the ball near halfway and "ran across the field at top speed, evading all attempts to stop him coming to the touch line, he retraced his steps infield fending off his tacklers in great style. Near the 25 Harris chased him, but Wilson had too good a start, and continuing he grounded the ball in a favourable position to goal. He scored again after good ball handling from his team mates where he took a pass from Harry Tancred and scored under the posts."

In his final match of the tour he was part of the New Zealand side which easily won 42-12 over Toowoomba where he scored another try. He took a pass after the ball crossed right across the field and he scored near the posts with Karl Ifwersen converting to give New Zealand a 10-0 lead.

Wilson last represented New Zealand in 1921. He was picked for the New Zealand tour of Australia but only played in the first 3 matches. New Zealand was thrashed 56-9 in the first game against New South Wales at the Sydney Cricket Ground before a crowd of 50,000. They then responded by pulling off an upset win two days later against Queensland. He scored a try after he "sprinted in after having had the ball kicked to him from the centre". Bill Davidson converted and New Zealand had a 19-0 lead and went on to win 25-12. He then scored another try against the same opponent on 11 June in a 21-16 loss. He had come on as a replacement for Charlie McElwee on a very heavy field due to wet weather and "ran half the length of the field after receiving from Charles Woolley". Unfortunately he sustained a bad leg injury and had to leave the field which meant New Zealand had to play with just 12 men for the remainder of the match. This was to be Wilson's last ever match for New Zealand as his injury ruled him out of the remaining 5 matches. The match ultimately turned out to be Wilson's last ever game of rugby league.

=== World War I, and NZ military rugby teams ===
Billy Wilson stated in his enlistment information that he was a member of the Eastbourne Rifle Club. He departed Wellington, New Zealand for World War I on 14 February 1915. He arrived at Suez in Egypt on 26 March. He was in the Veterinary Corps, part of the 3rd Reinforcements. His brother Ranji Wilson had departed for the war late the previous season. Both listed their mother as living at 70 Hopper Street in Wellington at the time with Billy's marital status said to be "single".

He was with the Veterinary Corps from December 1914 to March 1915 when he was attached to The New Zealand Army Service Corps, Divisional Train, 1 Company. He was with them during the Gallipoli Campaign and was taken ill suffering from pneumonia while at the Dardanelles on 14 May 1915. He was moved to hospital in Alexandra, Egypt before being discharged on 9 June. He went back to the Dardanelles on 9 July. Then at the end of December 1915 he was attached to the Divisional Train, 2 Company. In January 1916 he then transferred to the Wellington Infantry Regiment.

At one point he was a 'runner' in the war, delivering messages. In a letter sent back to New Zealand by Peter McColl he said that Wilson was a "runner of note and bears a charmed life apparently, judging by the number of stunts he gets into and out of; a runner's life in such times is the reverse of a happy one". He played regularly for the Wellington Battalion team in matches against other New Zealand teams made up from players stationed in Egypt in 1916. They played against an Otago side and won 15-3, Canterbury where they also won 28-3, and then against an Auckland side with an estimated 3 to 4,000 spectators. The Wellington team won again 14-0 with Wilson scoring 3 of their 4 tries. Wilson then played in the Wellington team again against a Maori side and won a hard match 3-0.

He was also picked in the New Zealand Battalion side (nicknamed the Trench Blacks) which was playing in 1916 and 1917. In a letter from Auckland rugby player Colin Murray he said that the team had beaten a British Division team 73-3, and another British Division team 44-0. They then played a Glamorgan side at Richmond, London in December 1916 by 22-0 though it was stated that he did not play in that particular match. Wins followed against a Welsh Division side 18-3, an Irish Division team 49-3, an R.F.C team 82-0, and a Welsh Division team 3-0. His New Zealand team mate Cecil King was also in the squad as was his brother Ranji. Wilson was part of the squad for the Somme Cup match against a French side played in front of tens of thousands however he was a reserve and did not take the field. The New Zealand team won 40-0. A match with a N.Z. Hospital side at Amiens in France.

Wilson was slightly wounded while fighting in France on 7 June 1917 but rejoined his Wellington Infantry Regiment 3 days later.

In a letter headed "France" and dated 8 August 1918 from a Wellington rugby player had details of it concerning the Wilson brothers was published in the Free Lance newspaper on 10 October that year. He said that "Arthur (Ranji) Wilson has been having a bad spin lately with a kind of trench fever. I saw him about a month ago. He had just rejoined his unit and was looking fairly well... Billy Wilson is also looking well, and has filled out a good deal".

Then in 1919 a letter was received from Peter McColl referring to a period from August to October 1918. He stated that ""Billy Wilson" always turns up like the old cat with the brick around its neck for the First Wellington Battalion, which has never had to acknowledge defeat until our little unit met them the other day. You can take it from me that "Billy" has gained and not lost any rugby wisdom, despite war knocks and conditions. He is still the fancy player of his battalion, but is too well watched. Wilson is always dangerous, and his meteoric sprints cause the First Wellingtonians to frisk and cavort with delight and yell for their fancy".

After returning from the war Wilson was awarded the British War Medal and the Victory Medal.

=== Reinstatement to rugby ===
In 1922 Wilson applied for reinstatement back into rugby. It was granted mid-season. He was eligible to play but by this stage he was 33 years old and after serving in the war and suffering from the occasional leg injury he doesn't appear to have played much if any rugby union football.

In 1923 it was mentioned that he had joined the Eastbourne rugby club and was helping to coach their third grade side by coaching the forwards.

== Death ==
Billy Wilson died in Levin on 19 February 1976 aged 86.
