= George Spencer (rugby) =

NZ dual-code international rugby footballer (1878-1950)

Personal information
- Born: 3 November 1878; Wellington, New Zealand
- Died: 28 April 1950 (aged 71); Wellington, New Zealand

Playing information
- Weight: 76 kg (12 st 0 lb)

Rugby union
- Position: fullback
Club
Years	Team	Pld	T	G	FG	P
	Melrose
Representative
Years	Team	Pld	T	G	FG	P
1900–08	Wellington	49
1907	New Zealand

Rugby league
- Position: Fullback
Representative
Years	Team	Pld	T	G	FG	P
1908–??	Wellington
1909	New Zealand	1	0	0	0	0
- Relatives: John Spencer (brother)

George Spencer (1878–1950) was a New Zealand rugby football player who represented New Zealand in both rugby union and rugby league. His brother, John, also was a dual-international.

== Early years ==
Spencer attended Mt Cook School in Wellington.

Spencer was a carpenter by trade.

== Rugby union career ==
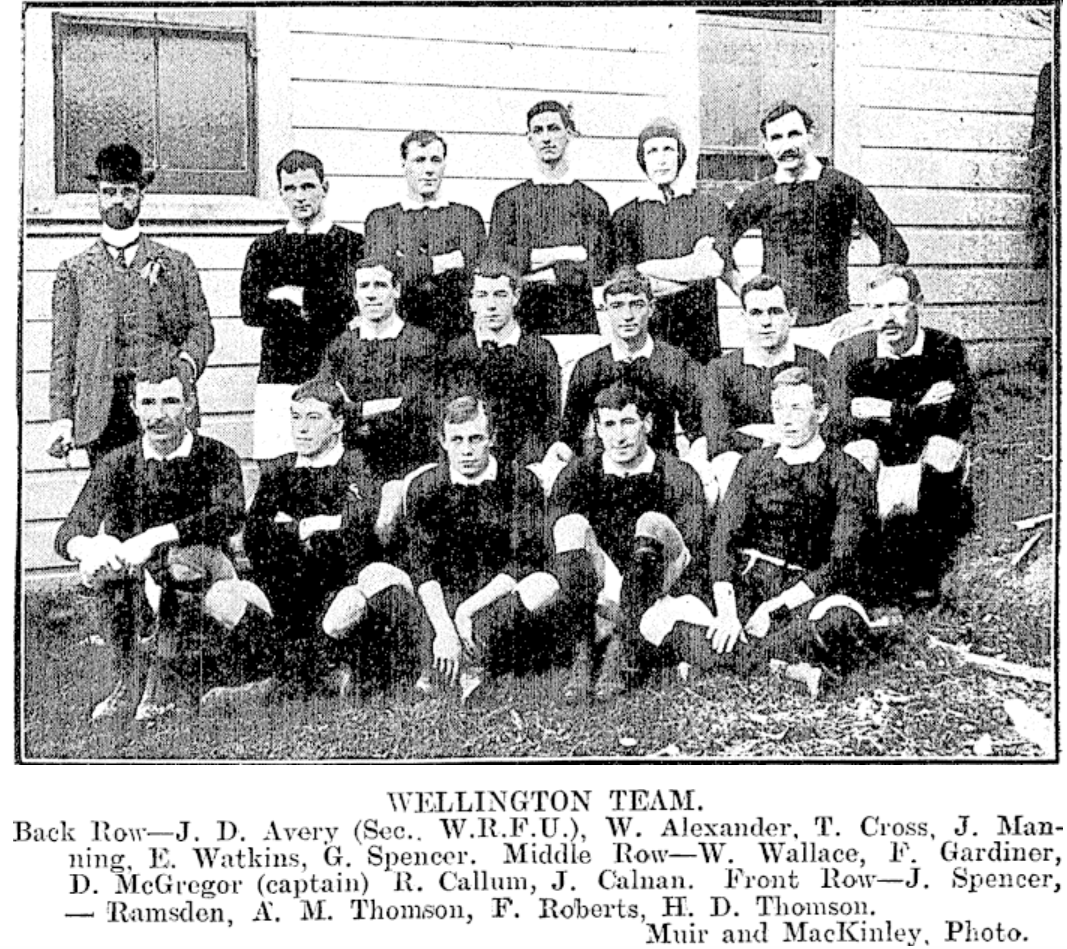
The Wellington team which defeated Wairarapa 62-9 on June 4, 1906.

Spencer represented Wellington in 49 matches, an unusually high number for anyone to play in those years of limited programmes, between 1900 and 1908.

He was in the team which won the first ever Ranfurly Shield match 6-3 against Auckland in 1904 and then played in a number of defences before the shield was regained by Auckland in 1905, kicking two penalties in Wellington's 10-6 loss.

After making the North Island side in 1907 Spencer, by now nearly 29, was chosen for the tour of Australia, as was John Spencer. He played in five matches on tour and kicked three conversions but he was overlooked for all three tests.

== Rugby league career ==
In 1908 he and his brother John switched to league, being part of the first ever provincial match in the country when they both played for Wellington against Auckland on 24 August.

In 1909, when he was 30, he toured Australia for a second time. He played in one of the tests thus gaining the cap he had missed in rugby union. The Spencers are the only brothers to have been both All Blacks and Kiwis.
