= Paddy George =

NZ international rugby league footballer

Personal information
- Full name: Kenneth Brooking George
- Born: 28 May 1883 New Zealand
- Died: 10 August 1950 (aged 67) New Plymouth, New Zealand

Playing information

Rugby union
Club
Years	Team	Pld	T	G	FG	P
1902	Star (Taranaki)	9	2	0	0	6
1903	City (Auckland)	18	8	0	0	24
	Total	27	10	0	0	30
Representative
Years	Team	Pld	T	G	FG	P
1902	Taranaki Trials	2	1	0	0	3
1902	Taranaki	3	0	0	0	0
1903	Auckland Trials	2	0	0	0	0

Rugby league
- Position: Stand-off
Club
Years	Team	Pld	T	G	FG	P
1912–13	Newtown	2	0	2	0	4
Representative
Years	Team	Pld	T	G	FG	P
1908–13	Wellington
1909–13	New Zealand	6	1	1	0	5

Kenneth Brooking "Paddy" George (28 May 1883 – 10 August 1950) was a New Zealand rugby union and professional rugby league footballer who played in the 1900s and 1910s. He played club level rugby union (RU) for City, and representative rugby league (RL) for New Zealand (non-Test matches), and Wellington, and at club level for Newtown, as a stand-off.

== Playing career ==
George played rugby in the Taranaki area for the Star club. Despite being in his debut season at the senior level he was selected for 2 trial matches (North team, and Probables team) before being chosen for the Taranaki side. He played 3 matches for them against Canterbury, Wellington, and Auckland before moving to Auckland to start the 1903 season. He played rugby union in the Auckland Rugby Union competition for the City club. City won the competition. In 1904, along with Andrew J. "Paddy" Long, he was found guilty of match-fixing and suspended for 10 years. Long played for the Newton club. The two players had been approached by a bookie and accepted money to throw the result of the match between the two teams. The match was drawn 0-0 and Newton went on to win the championship a week later.

George subsequently moved to Wellington and in 1908 he was part of the very first rugby league match on New Zealand soil, at the end of the 1907-08 All Golds tour.

George then represented Wellington and was part of the 1909 New Zealand tour of Australia. In 1912 he was part of the committee that founded the Newtown rugby league club, which took part in the inaugural Wellington Rugby League competition.

During the 1913 tour of New Zealand by New South Wales, George played against the touring party twice - for Wellington and New Zealand.

Paddy George played stand-off in Wellington's 33-18 victory over Auckland during the 1913 New Zealand rugby league season Inter-district competition on Saturday 27 September 1913, this would be Wellington's last victory against Auckland until 1988.

== Death ==
George died in 1950 and was buried at Te Henui Cemetery in New Plymouth.

== Note ==
George's nickname of "Paddy" does not appear to be derived from his given names of Kenneth Brooking, although rugbyleagueproject.org, nzrl.co.nz, and nzleague.co.nz, erroneously state his given name as Patrick, this could be a case of reverse-annotation from the nickname Paddy.
