= Stan Dobson =

New Zealand international rugby league footballer

Personal information
- Full name: Stanley Dobson
- Born: 1898
- Died: Deceased

Playing information
- Position: Centre
Representative
Years	Team	Pld	T	G	FG	P
≤1920–≥20	Wellington
1920	New Zealand	1	0	0	0	0

Stanley Dobson was a New Zealand professional rugby league footballer who played in the 1920s. He played at representative level for New Zealand, and Wellington, as a centre.

== Playing career ==
=== International honours ===
Stan Dobson represented New Zealand in 1920 against Great Britain.
