= 1916 New Zealand rugby league season =

Seasons
- ← 1915 1917 →

The 1916 New Zealand rugby league season was the ninth season of rugby league that had been played in New Zealand.

== International competitions ==
New Zealand played no international matches in 1916.

== National competitions ==
=== Northern Union Cup ===
Auckland again held the Northern Union Cup at the end of the season.

== Club competitions ==
=== Auckland ===
City won the Auckland Rugby League's competition and the Roope Rooster.

Ponsonby United captain Scotty McClymount won the title of favourite player in a public charity vote held to raise funds for the War effort. City's Albert Asher was second and Grafton's Karl Ifwersen finished third.

=== Other Competitions ===
The Wellington Rugby League's competition was suspended from 1916 until 1918. The Canterbury Rugby League's competition was suspended for the 1916 season.
