= Bill King (New Zealand rugby league) =

NZ international rugby league footballer

Personal information
- Full name: William Henry King
- Born: 7 August 1892; New Zealand
- Died: Deceased

Playing information
- Position: Loose forward
Club
Years	Team	Pld	T	G	FG	P
1913–??	Sydenham
Representative
Years	Team	Pld	T	G	FG	P
	Canterbury
1919	New Zealand	1	0	0	0	0

William Henry King was a New Zealand rugby league footballer who represented New Zealand.

== Playing career ==
King was the second oldest of four brothers who all played for Sydenham; Tom, Frank and Bert. Usually a loose forward, King could play in the backs when required.

He started his career playing rugby union for the Sydenham Rugby Club before switching to rugby league halfway through the inaugural Canterbury Rugby League season in 1913.

King served in the New Zealand Army during World War I.

After the war King returned to the Canterbury team. He was selected for New Zealand in 1919, playing in the first Test against Australia. He withdrew from New Zealand's 1919 tour of Australia due to business reasons.

== Later years ==
King was a temporary headmaster at Halswell School sometime between 1937 and 1939.

King coached the Sydenham juniors after his retirement.
