= Ranji Wilson =

NZ international rugby union player (1886-1953)

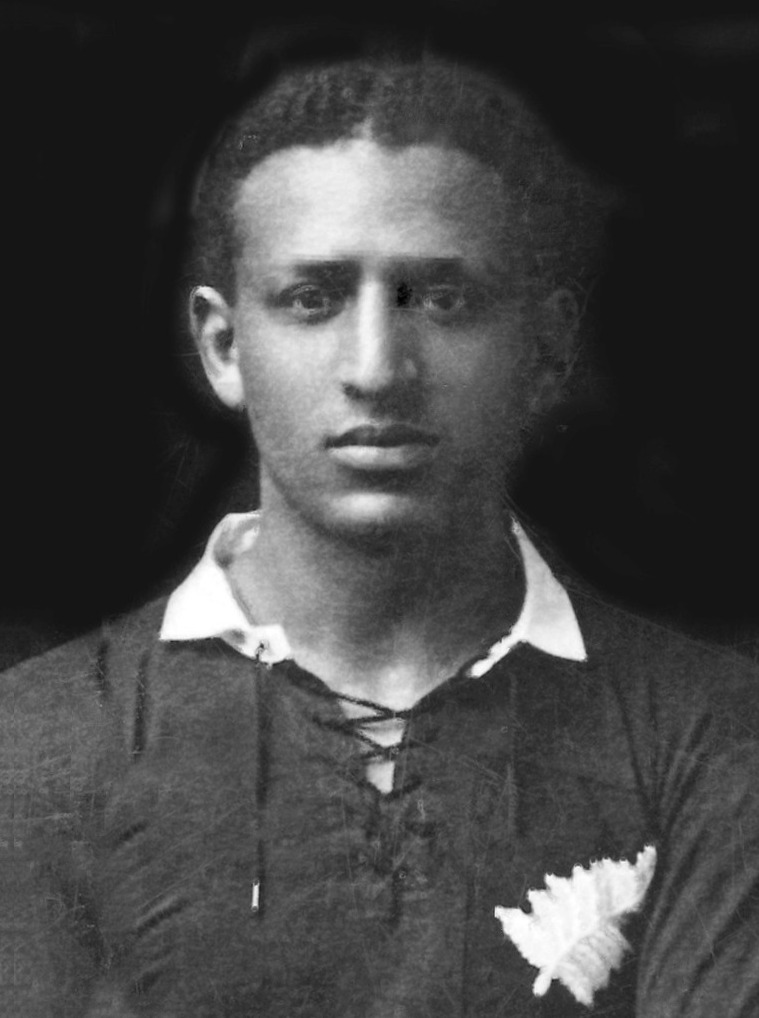
- Wilson in 1908
- Born: 18 May 1886 Christchurch, New Zealand
- Died: 11 August 1953 (aged 67) Lower Hutt, New Zealand
- Notable relative: Billy Wilson (brother)

Rugby union career
- Position: Loose forward
International career
| Years | Team | Apps | (Points) |
| 1908–1914 | New Zealand | 21 | (18) |

Nathaniel Arthur "Ranji" Wilson (18 May 1886 – 11 August 1953) was an early All Black, rugby football player for New Zealand. He was born in Christchurch of English/West Indian parentage.

Wilson was chosen for the All Blacks for matches against the touring Anglo-Welsh in 1908, versus Australia in 1910, 1913 and again in 1914.

In an unusual case, he was charged with assault in 1910 for actions during match, but was found not guilty. Unfortunately for his brother Billy Wilson he said that he knew who threw the punch and when the Wellington Rugby Union asked him to say who it was he refused. Both brothers along with a third (Joseph) were playing in the same match and there was considerable confusion over which of the brothers may have thrown the punch. They then banned Billy for life from playing rugby union. He switched to rugby league and played many times for New Zealand

During the First World War, he was one of the stars of the New Zealand Services team which won the Kings Cup against other Dominion countries in 1918–19, and would have toured South Africa with the New Zealand Army team in 1919 had he not been classed as "coloured".

Wilson was later one of the team of seven selectors who picked the 1924-5 "Invincibles" team that toured Great Britain, France and Canada undefeated. He died on 11 August 1953 in Lower Hutt.
