= Bill Guiney =

New Zealand international rugby league footballer

Personal information
- Full name: Wilfred Patterson Guiney
- Born: 13 April 1892; New Zealand
- Died: 29 January 1941 (aged 48); New Zealand

Playing information
- Position: Stand-off, Wing
Club
Years	Team	Pld	T	G	FG	P
1920	Addington	11	4	0	0	12
Representative
Years	Team	Pld	T	G	FG	P
1920	Canterbury	3	3	1	0	11
1920	New Zealand	1	1	0	0	3

Wilfred Patterson "Bill" Guiney is a New Zealand rugby league player who represented New Zealand .

== Playing career ==
Guiney represented Addington in the Canterbury Rugby League competition. In 1920 he was selected to play for New Zealand against Great Britain. In the second test match, played at Lancaster Park, he scored New Zealand's try in their 19–3 defeat.

== Personal life ==
He married Marjorie Ross Hawley on 13 July 1926. He died in 1941 leaving behind his wife and a 13 year old son, 12 year old daughter and 3 year old son. He had spent time in Australia and served in the Divisional Ammunition Column of the Australian Imperial Force.
