= Percy Williams (New Zealand rugby league player) =

NZ international rugby league footballer

Personal information
- Full name: Lionel Percival Williams
- Born: 6 January 1879 Russell, Northland Region, New Zealand
- Died: 8 May 1947 (aged 68) New Zealand

Playing information
- Position: Hooker, Second-row, Loose forward
Club
Years	Team	Pld	T	G	FG	P
1910–13	Wigan	111	16	0	0	48
1914	City Rovers	7	0	0	0	0
	Total	118	16	0	0	48
Representative
Years	Team	Pld	T	G	FG	P
1913	Auckland	2	0	0	0	0
1913	New Zealand	2	0	0	0	0

Percy Williams (1879-1947) was a New Zealand rugby union and professional rugby league footballer who played representative rugby league (RL) for New Zealand.

== Early years ==
Williams originally played rugby union for the City club in Auckland and represented Auckland.

== Playing career ==
He played club rugby for City in Auckland and also played for the Auckland representative team. He was signed by Wigan in August, 1910. Williams played for Wigan for three seasons between 1910/11 to 1912/13. During this time he played in 111 matches for the club in the Lancashire League, including in the 1911 Challenge Cup Final loss.

In 1913 he was called into the New Zealand squad, joining them midway through their tour of Australia. He had been returning to New Zealand from England at the time. Williams was said to be instrumental in New Zealand's 17-11 upset victory over New South Wales.

Williams returned to New Zealand after the tour and in 1914 he played 7 matches for the City Rovers club in Auckland before announcing his retirement before the start of the 1915 season.
