= David McPhail (rugby league) =

NZ rugby league & union footballer

Personal information
- Born: 30 June 1886; New Zealand
- Died: Deceased

Playing information

Rugby union
- Position: Wing-Forward
Representative
Years	Team	Pld	T	G	FG	P
	Canterbury

Rugby league
- Position: Centre
Club
Years	Team	Pld	T	G	FG	P
1909–10	Wigan	0	0	0	0	0
1910–11	St. Helens	10	1	0	0	3
1913	Sydenham (CRL)
	Total	10	1	0	0	3
Representative
Years	Team	Pld	T	G	FG	P
1912	Canterbury

David McPhail (30 June 1886 – ?) was a New Zealand rugby league footballer who played professionally for St. Helens and Wigan.

== Early years ==
McPhail was born in 1886. From a prominent rugby union family, he played for Canterbury as a wing-forward.

== Playing career ==
McPhail arrived in England aboard the S.S. Arawa, on 15 November 1909, together with Lance Todd. Both players signed for the Wigan club and McPhail played his first match for Wigan in the A team against Widnes on 27 November 1909.

He was unable to break into the first team at Wigan and on 2 September 1910 he was transferred to St. Helens, joining fellow New Zealanders Arthur Kelly and Herbert Turtill. McPhail made his début for St Helens against Oldham Bears on 3 September 1910 however he made just ten appearances for the club and left at the end of the season.

McPhail returned to New Zealand and became active in growing rugby league in his home country. On 13 July 1912 McPhail was present at a meeting that founded the Canterbury Rugby League and he was part of the very first Canterbury side when it played Wellington at the Show Grounds on 7 September 1912, losing 4-5. The next week they lost 5-28 to the touring New South Wales side before recording their first win, against Hawkes Bay in Napier, 10-8.

McPhail was involved in the foundation of the Sydenham club on 7 February 1913 and became the club captain. That year, Sydenham won the Canterbury Rugby League's inaugural competition over twelve rounds.
