= Les Campbell (rugby league) =

New Zealand international rugby league footballer

Personal information
- Full name: Leslie Campbell
- Born: 4 July 1879
- Died: Deceased

Playing information
- Weight: 13 st 10 lb (87 kg)

Rugby league
- Position: Forward
Club
Years	Team	Pld	T	G	FG	P
1912	Athletic	3	1	0	0	3
1913	Newtown	7	3	4	0	17
1914–19	Suburbs	19	9	15	0	57
	Total	29	13	19	0	77
Representative
Years	Team	Pld	T	G	FG	P
1912–14	Wellington	8	5	7	0	29
1913	New Zealand	4	2	0	0	6
1913–15	Wellington trial	5	0	0	0	0

Rugby union
Club
Years	Team	Pld	T	G	FG	P
1908–12	Southern

Leslie Campbell was a New Zealand professional rugby league footballer who played in the 1910s. He played at representative level for New Zealand, and Wellington, and at club level for Newtown, as a forward.

== Playing career ==
Les Campbell played as a forward in Wellington's 33-18 victory over Auckland during the 1913 New Zealand rugby league season Inter-district competition on Saturday 27 September 1913, this would be Wellington's last victory against Auckland until 1988.

=== International honours ===
Campbell represented New Zealand on their 1913 tour of Australia.
