= John Spencer (rugby, born 1880) =

NZ dual-code international rugby footballer (1880-1936)

Personal information
- Full name: John Clarence Spencer
- Born: 27 November 1880 Wellington, New Zealand
- Died: 21 May 1936 (aged 55) Wellington, New Zealand

Playing information
- Weight: 85 kg (13 st 5 lb)

Rugby union
- Position: Lock
Club
Years	Team	Pld	T	G	FG	P
	Melrose
Representative
Years	Team	Pld	T	G	FG	P
1898–07	Wellington
1903–07	New Zealand	2	0	0	0	0

Rugby league
- Position: Loose forward
Club
Years	Team	Pld	T	G	FG	P
	Newtown
Representative
Years	Team	Pld	T	G	FG	P
1908–13	Wellington
1909	New Zealand	3	0	0	0	0
- Education: Mt Cook School
- Relatives: George Spencer (brother)

John Clarence Spencer (1880–1936) was a New Zealand rugby football player who represented New Zealand in both rugby union and rugby league. His brother, George, also was a dual-international.

== Early years ==
Spencer attended Mt Cook School in Wellington.

== Rugby union career ==
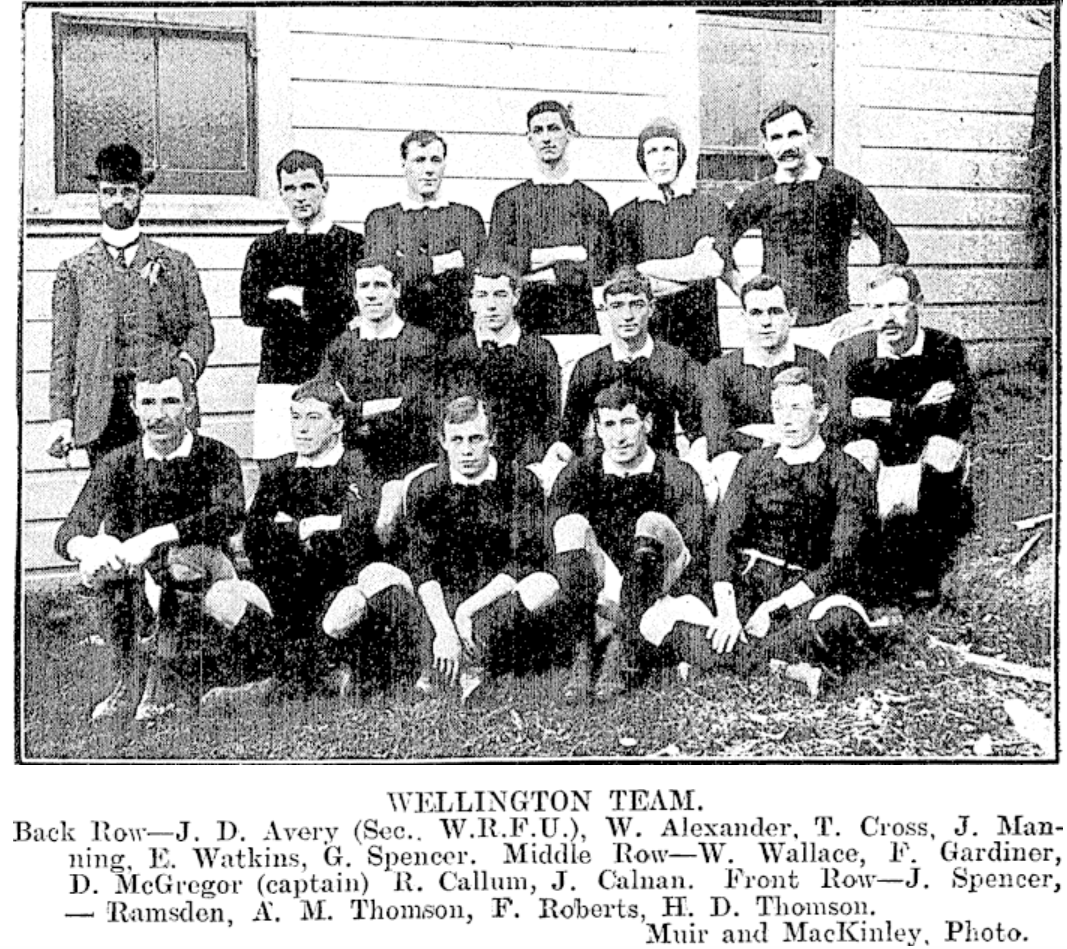

From the Melrose club, Spencer represented Wellington along with four of his brothers. He, along with his brothers, contributed significantly to the club's six Wellington club championship wins between 1896 and 1908.

Spencer was only 17 when he first represented Wellington in 1898 and remains one of the youngest to ever have played for the union. Spencer played for Wellington against the 1903 New Zealand team before joining it for the tour of Australia. However Spencer injured himself aboard the ship and played in only two tour matches.

Spencer missed most of the 1904 season as a result but returned in 1905 to play for Wellington against the departing Originals side. He then captained a combined Wellington-Wairarapa-Horowhenua selection to a 23–7 win over the touring Australian side and was made captain of the New Zealand side which played an official test against the tourists, despite the absence of the Originals squad.

Spencer, along with his brother George, made the All Blacks' tour of Australia in 1907, playing in only three of the eight matches. In the first Test match he became the first New Zealander to win a test cap as a replacement when he came off the bench to replace an injured John Colman.

== Rugby league career ==
In 1908 he and his brother George switched to league, being part of the first ever provincial match in the country when they both played for Wellington against Auckland on 24 August.

In 1909 he toured Australia with the New Zealand rugby league side. He played in all three test matches. The Spencers are the only brothers to have been both All Blacks and Kiwis.

He played in Wellington's 1913 victory over Auckland.

== Later years ==
Spencer returned to rugby union in later years and became a club coach for Berhampore in Wellington.
