= James Barber (rugby) =

NZ international rugby league footballer

Personal information
- Born: 11 May 1878 Wellington, New Zealand
- Died: 4 August 1965 (aged 87) Newtown, Wellington, New Zealand

Playing information
- Weight: 69 kg (10 st 12 lb)

Rugby union
- Position: Fullback, Scrum-half
Club
Years	Team	Pld	T	G	FG	P
	Wellington

Rugby league
- Position: Centre, Halfback
Club
Years	Team	Pld	T	G	FG	P
1908–13	Petone
Representative
Years	Team	Pld	T	G	FG	P
1908–12	New Zealand	6	0	0	0	0
1908–14	Wellington

James Barber (11 May 1878 – 4 August 1965) was a New Zealand rugby footballer who represented New Zealand in rugby league.

== Rugby union career ==
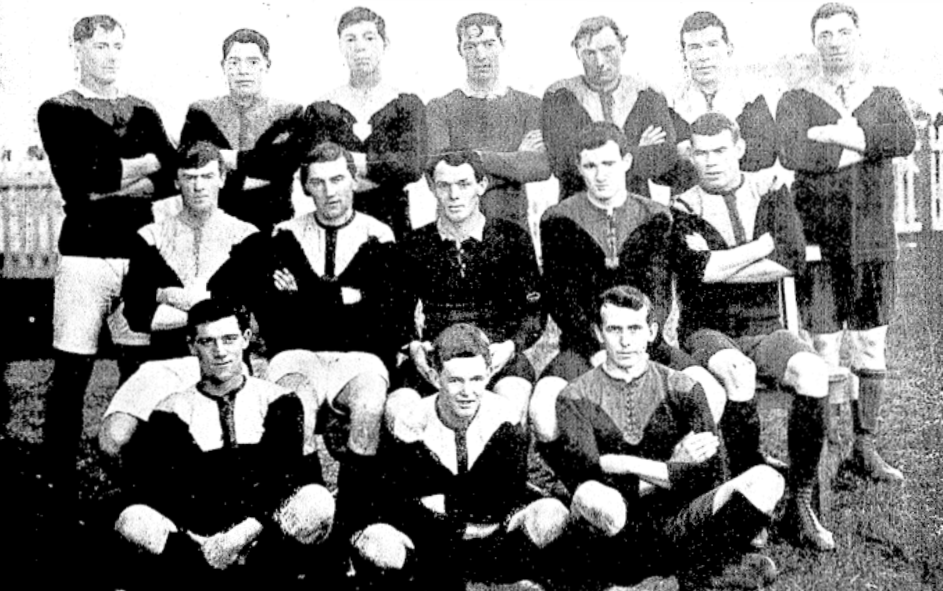
The Petone senior rugby team in 1907 with Barber in the second row on the left. Tom Cross (rugby), Hercules Wright, and Henry Knight were in the back row on the left. were next to him to the left

Barber originally played rugby union and represented Wellington. He played at fullback or scrum-half and was part of the side that won the Ranfurly Shield.

== Rugby league career ==
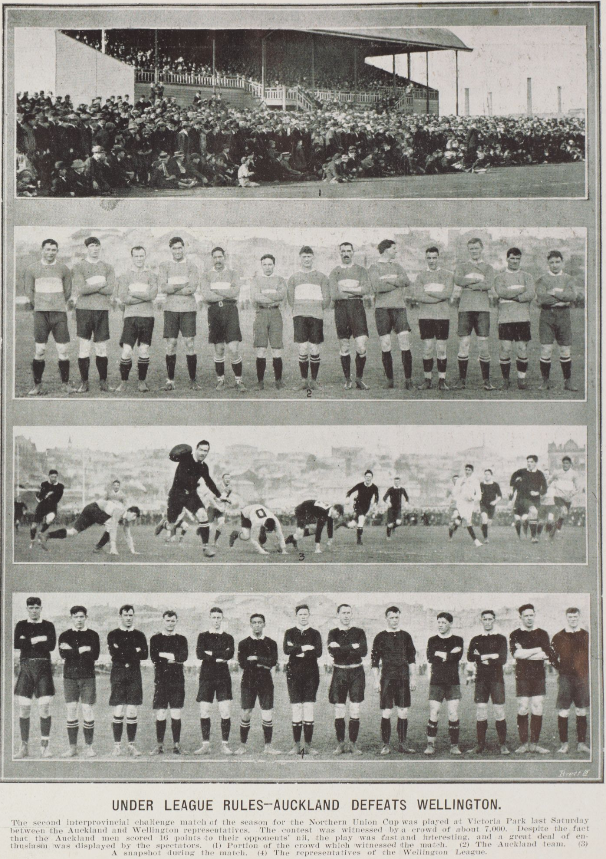
Barber in the Wellington side v Auckland at Victoria Park in 1912.

Barber originally missed selection for the professional All Blacks for the 1907–1908 tour of Great Britain and Australia but was placed on stand by. By the time the side reached Australia in 1908 the side was short of backs, due to several players opting to remain in Britain, and Barber was called over to join the squad. He played in the first ever trans-Tasman test which was the debut match of the Australia national rugby league team. Barber would go on to appear in all three test matches against Australia.

Barber later captained the New Zealand side in its 1909 tour of Australia. His last game for New Zealand was in 1912.

In 1912 he was in Petone's side that won the inaugural Wellington Rugby League competition. Barber captained Wellington between 1911 and 1914, including Wellington's 1913 victory over Auckland.

== Cricket career ==
According to The Evening Post, Barber played for Petone Cricket Club from 1897 until 1960, and was believed to have scored over 12,000 runs and taken over 500 wickets for the club. He scored his last century at the age of 65, and made a score of 77 on his 77th birthday. He played his last game of cricket at the age of 82.

== Death ==
Barber died at Wellington Hospital on 4 August 1965, aged 87.

== Legacy ==
Barber was named as the halfback in the Petone Panthers' Team of the Century in 2012.
