= Jim Auld =

New Zealand international rugby league footballer (1889–1974)

Personal information
- Full name: James Wilton Auld
- Born: 6 January 1889 New Zealand
- Died: 23 February 1974 (aged 85) Auckland, New Zealand

Playing information
- Weight: 13 st 6 lb (85 kg)
- Position: Prop, Second-row, Hooker
Club
Years	Team	Pld	T	G	FG	P
1913	Sydenham	12	3	0	0	9
Representative
Years	Team	Pld	T	G	FG	P
1912–13	Canterbury	5	1	0	0	3
1913	New Zealand	5	0	0	0	0

James Wilton Auld (6 January 1889 – 23 February 1974) was a New Zealand rugby league player who represented New Zealand in 1913.

== Early life ==
Jim Auld was born on 6 January 1889. He was the son of Jessie Auld and Hugh Ballie Auld.

== Playing career ==
In 1912, Auld was part of the first ever Canterbury side. Canterbury went down 4–5 to Wellington on 7 September.

In 1913, Auld captained Sydenham to the championship in the new Canterbury Rugby League competition and again played for Canterbury. He was selected in the New Zealand side and toured Australia, playing against New South Wales in three of the four "tests" during the season.

Auld later became a referee before moving to Palmerston North.

== Marriage and Death ==
Jim Auld married Ada Louisa Sherwood on 8 April 1912. They had two children, William Edward Husk Auld (b. 1915) and Louisa Blanche Auld (b. 1918). William played representative rugby for Wanganui in 1941. Jim Auld died on 23 February 1974, in Auckland. He was buried at Purewa Cemetery in Meadowbank, Auckland.
