= George Bradley (rugby league) =

New Zealand international rugby league footballer

Personal information
- Born: 18 May 1889
- Died: Deceased

Playing information
- Weight: 73 kg (11 st 7 lb)
- Position: Wing, Centre, Stand-off
Club
Years	Team	Pld	T	G	FG	P
≤1913–≥13	Athletic (WRL)
Representative
Years	Team	Pld	T	G	FG	P
≤1911–≥12	Wellington
1912–19	New Zealand	5	2	0	0	4

George Bradley was a New Zealand rugby league footballer who played in the 1910s. He played at representative level for New Zealand (captain), and Wellington, and at club level for Athletic RLFC, as a wing, centre, or stand-off.

== Playing career ==
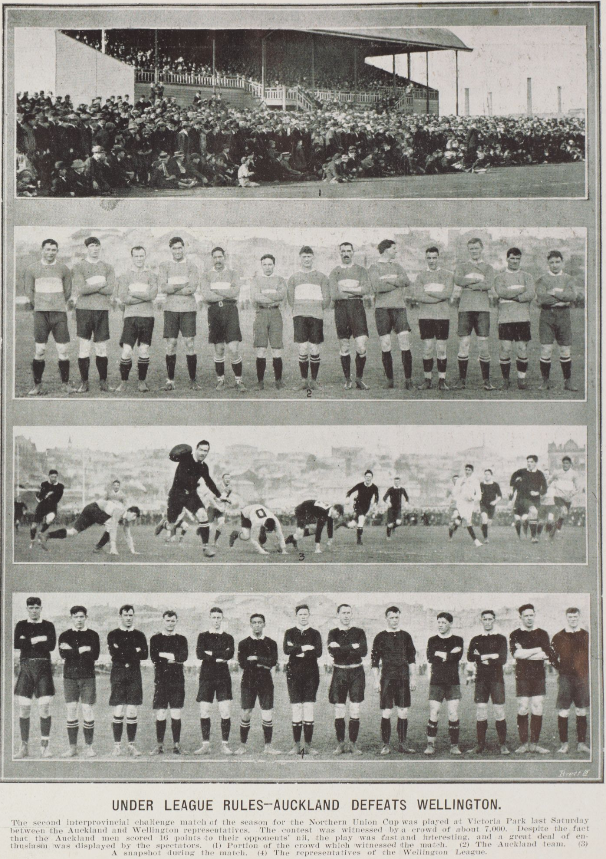
Bradley in the Wellington side to play Auckland in 1912 at Victoria Park.

Bradley played on the wing in Wellington's 33-18 victory over Auckland during the 1913 New Zealand rugby league season Inter-district competition on Saturday 27 September 1913, this would be Wellington's last victory against Auckland until 1988.

=== International honours ===
Bradley represented New Zealand on the 1912 tour of Australia and on the 1913 tour of Australia, during the 1914 Great Britain Lions tour of Australia and New Zealand during the 1914 New Zealand rugby league season played at centre, and was captain against Great Britain, and during the 1919 Australia rugby league tour of New Zealand during the 1919 New Zealand rugby league season against Australia (4-matches).
