= Abbie Shadbolt =

New Zealand rugby union and rugby league footballer

Personal information
- Full name: Albert Edward Shadbolt
- Born: 29 May 1887 Whanganui, New Zealand
- Died: 13 July 1971 (aged 84) Trentham, Upper Hutt, Wellington, New Zealand

Playing information
- Weight: 13 st 4 lb (84 kg)

Rugby union
- Position: Number eight, Wing
Club
Years	Team	Pld	T	G	FG	P
1906–08	Awahou (Manawatu)
1908	Athletic (Wellington)	3	0	0	0	0
1909	Poneke	6	3	0	0	9
1909–12	Merivale (Christchurch)	43	17	2	0	55
	Total	52	20	2	0	64
Representative
Years	Team	Pld	T	G	FG	P
1906–07	Manawatu	5	0	1	0	2
1908	Wellington	4	2	0	0	6
1910–12	Canterbury Trial	3	2	0	0	6
1909–11	Canterbury	8	3	1	0	12

Rugby league
- Position: Centre, Stand-off, Loose forward, Prop
Club
Years	Team	Pld	T	G	FG	P
1913	St Albans	9	7	6	0	33
1920–21	Federal	15	12	4	0	44
	Total	24	19	10	0	77
Representative
Years	Team	Pld	T	G	FG	P
1912–21	Canterbury	8	3	1	0	11
1913–21	New Zealand	7	2	0	0	6

Albert "Abbie" Shadbolt (29 May 1887 – 13 July 1971) was a New Zealand rugby union and professional rugby league footballer who played representative rugby league (RL) for New Zealand.

== Early life ==
Albert Edward Shadbolt was born on 28 May 1887 in Whanganui. His father was also named Albert Edward Shadbolt and his mother was Jessie McIntosh. His father was on the Foxton Borough Council in the early part of the century and stood for mayor in 1907. he had originally been from Akaroa, in Canterbury before moving to Wellington where he learned the butchery trade and opened a butchery in Foxton. He sold this business in 1906 and bought the Manawatu Hotel. Albert senior was heavily involved in sports, particularly the New Zealand Athletic Association which he was vice-president of.

== Playing career ==
Shadbolt originally began playing rugby in the Wellington area. He played for Athletic in the 1908 season and made the Wellington side after being selected for the Wellington B team prior but not being able to play. He played in matches against Canterbury, Manawatu, Taranaki, and Otago. In the 1909 season he switched to the Poneke club and was selected to play for Wellington against Wanganui but was transferred to Christchurch for work prior to the game. After he moved to Christchurch he joined the Merivale club. There he was alongside fellow future New Zealand rugby league international Bill Mitchell. He represented Canterbury XV in 1909 and 1910.

In 1912 Shadbolt switched codes and was part of the first ever Canterbury rugby league side. Canterbury went down 4–5 to Wellington on 7 September.

In 1913 Shadbolt played for St Albans in the new Canterbury Rugby League competition and again played for Canterbury. He was selected in the New Zealand side that toured Australia and played against New South Wales during the season. He didn't play for several years but resumed playing in 1920 when he joined the Federal club, and he played for Canterbury in the same season. In 1921 Shadbolt toured Australia for New Zealand under coach Jim Rukutai.

After retirement Shadbolt served as a referee.

== Personal life ==
He married Eleanor Kermode Radcliffe on 11 January 1911. They had 5 children: Verona Althea (b.1911), Rawene (b.1914), Christina Eileen (b.1915), Peggie (b.1919), and Owen Radcliffe (b.1921). He separated from his wife and remarried in 1926 to Catherine Gertrude Thomas. Albert died in 1971 in Trentham, Upper Hutt.
