= Somme Cup =

The Somme Cup
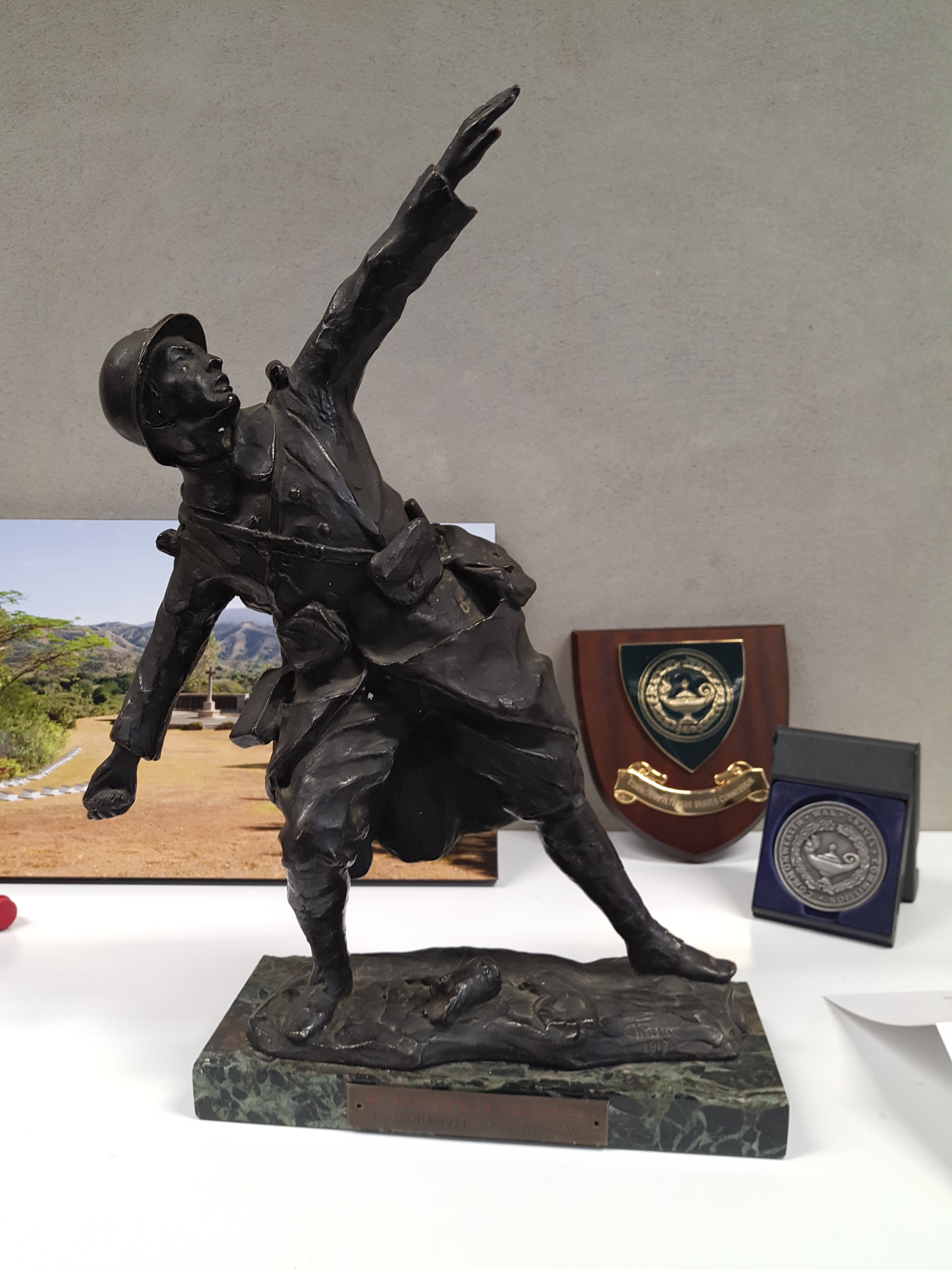
- Sport: Rugby

History
- First winner: New Zealand Army rugby team

The Somme Cup is a rugby trophy first won by a New Zealand Army team, known as the Trench Blacks, during World War I in 1917. It is claimed that around 60,000 people watched the match, which was won 40-0 by the New Zealand team.

The cup depicts a soldier throwing a grenade, and was created by Georges Chauvel in 1917, a French sculptor in the French Army at the time.

The cup has been in a private collection since it was first won in the War.

In September 2015 the New Zealand Defence Force's rugby team, the Defence Blacks, played a commemorative match against a French team in Paris.

In early 2016, the cup was put on display at the National Army Museum in Waiouru, as part of an exhibition about rugby during World War I.
