= Bill Bussell =

New Zealand international rugby league footballer

Personal information
- Full name: William Samuel Bussell
- Born: 19 February 1887; Christchurch, New Zealand
- Died: 7 June 1917 (aged 30); Messines, Belgium

Playing information
- Height: 163 cm (5 ft 4 in)
- Weight: 59 kg (9 st 4 lb)
- Position: Halfback
Club
Years	Team	Pld	T	G	FG	P
1914–15	Sydenham	21	10	16	1	64
Representative
Years	Team	Pld	T	G	FG	P
1912–1914	Canterbury	3	0	0	0	0
1914	New Zealand	1	0	0	0	0

William Samuel Bussell (19 February 1887 – 7 June 1917) was a New Zealand rugby league player who represented New Zealand. Bussell was killed in action during World War I.

== Personal life ==
Bussell was the son of William and Hester Bussell and lived in St Albans, Christchurch.

== Playing career ==
In 1912 Bussell was part of the first ever Canterbury side. Canterbury went down 4-5 to Wellington on 7 September.

In 1914 he played for Sydenham in the Canterbury Rugby League competition and also captained Canterbury before being selected to represent New Zealand against the Great Britain Lions. New Zealand lost the Test match 13-16. He was selected for the 1915 New Zealand tour of Australia that was later abandoned.

== World War I ==
With the outbreak of World War I, Bussell enlisted. In 1917 Private Bussell was killed in action during the Battle of Messines.
