= Bill Kelly (rugby league) =

NZ coach and former NZ & Australia international rugby league footballer

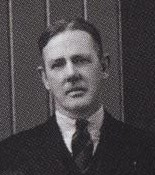
- Kelly in 1939

Personal information
- Full name: William Martin Kelly
- Born: 9 November 1890 Westport, New Zealand
- Died: 1 July 1975 (aged 84) Killara, New South Wales

Playing information

Rugby union
Club
Years	Team	Pld	T	G	FG	P
1909–10	Westport Rivals
1911	Poneke	12	4	0	0	12
1912	Athletic	6	1	0	0	3
	Total	18	5	0	0	15
Representative
Years	Team	Pld	T	G	FG	P
1910	Buller	2	1	0	0	3
1911	Wellington	1	0	0	0	0

Rugby league
- Position: Centre, Stand-off
Club
Years	Team	Pld	T	G	FG	P
1912–13	Athletic (WRL)	11	6	0	0	18
1914–15	Balmain	27	16	0	0	48
	Total	38	22	0	0	66
Representative
Years	Team	Pld	T	G	FG	P
1912–13	Wellington	12	7	1	0	23
1912–13	New Zealand	14	13	0	0	39
1914	Metropolis	3	2	0	0	6
1914–15	New South Wales	3	1	0	0	3
1914	Australia	1	0	0	0	0

Coaching information
Club
Years	Team	Gms	W	D	L	W%
1914–15	Balmain	28	18	6	4	64
1923–24	University	24	4	2	18	17
1936–37	Newtown	22	11	0	11	50
1938–43	Balmain	92	55	5	32	60
1944	St. George	15	9	0	6	60
1945	Canterbury-Bankstown	14	4	1	9	29
	Total	195	101	14	80	52
Representative
Years	Team	Gms	W	D	L	W%
1932	New Zealand	3	0	0	3	0
1932	Auckland	1	0	0	1	0

William Martin Kelly (1892–1975), born in Westport, New Zealand was a rugby league football identity who enjoyed success in New Zealand and Australia as both a player and coach in the first half of the 20th century. He played for Wellington, the Balmain Tigers, New South Wales and for both the New Zealand and Australian national sides. He also had a long coaching career with five different clubs in the NSWRFL in the 1920s, 1930s and 1940s, and with New Zealand in 1932.

== Early years ==
Born in Westport, Kelly played first class rugby union for Buller when he was 18 and later represented Wellington.

== Playing career ==
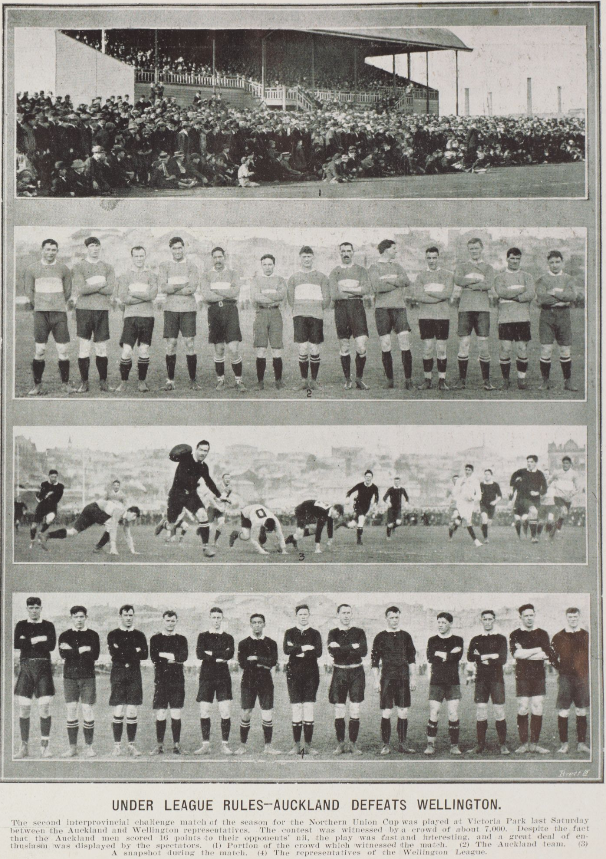
Kelly in the Wellington side which played Auckland at Victoria Park on August 10, 1912.

He began playing rugby union for the Westport Rivals club in 1909. In 1910 he was again playing for them and at the end of the season he was selected to play for Buller. His debut representative match for them was against West Coast on September 10. Buller lost 16-0 with Kelly at five eighth. 3 days later he played against Inangahua and scored a try in a 6-3 loss. He then moved to Wellington. Kelly switched to rugby league with the launch of the Wellington Rugby League competition in 1912 and played for Athletic in their grand final loss to Petone.

He became a Wellington representative and toured Australia in 1912 and 1913 with the New Zealand national side. No test matches were played with the Kiwis meeting New South Wales and Queensland and a number of regional sides. He played in Wellingtons 1913 victory over Auckland.

He joined the Balmain Tigers in Sydney in 1914 and that same year made his sole international Test appearance as a centre for Australia in the first Test against England at the Royal Agricultural Ground. He is listed on the Australian Players Register as Kangaroo No. 90.

He made further representative appearances for New South Wales in 1915 and captain-coached an undefeated Balmain Tigers side to the club's first premiership victory in season 1915. He was the first New Zealander to appear in an NSWRL grand final.

== War service ==
Kelly enlisted in the 1st AIF in 1916 in Sydney. He joined Machine Gun Company No. 9 and embarked for the Western Front on HMAT Benalla in May 1916. He was a Sergeant when he sustained wounds in Belgium which saw him repatriated in October 1917.

== Coaching career ==
Balmain Premiers 1939 – Bill Kelly, back row, third from left

Kelly turned to coaching Sydney teams and guided the Balmain Tigers to the 1939 NSWRL premiership. He coached University (1923–1924), Newtown (1936–1937), Balmain Tigers (1938–1943), St. George Dragons (1944) and Canterbury Bankstown in 1945. After such a long coaching career, Billy Kelly was widely known as the 'Prince of Coaches'.

In 1932 Kelly returned to New Zealand. He coached both New Zealand and Auckland against the 1932 Great Britain team.

== Legacy ==
Since 1997 Australia and New Zealand have contested the Bill Kelly Memorial Cup which is awarded to the winner of transtasman tests.

In 2012 he was named in the Wellington Rugby League's Team of the Century.

== Sources ==
- Whiticker, Alan & Collis, Ian (2006) The History of Rugby League Clubs, New Holland, Sydney
- Whiticker, Alan & Hudson, Glen (2006) The Encyclopedia of Rugby League Players, Gavin Allen Publishing, Sydney
- Heads, Ian and Middleton, David (2008) A Centenary of Rugby League, MacMillan Sydney
- Andrews, Malcolm (2006) The ABC of Rugby League Austn Broadcasting Corpn, Sydney
