= Daniel Fraser (rugby) =

NZ international rugby league footballer

Personal information
- Full name: Daniel George Fraser
- Born: 24 October 1881; Wellington, New Zealand
- Died: 4 April 1949 (aged 67); Wellington, New Zealand

Playing information
- Height: 5 ft 10 in (1.78 m)
- Weight: 12 st 6 lb (79 kg)

Rugby union
- Position: Forward
Club
Years	Team	Pld	T	G	FG	P
1903–06	Petone	38	1	0	0	3

Rugby league
Representative
Years	Team	Pld	T	G	FG	P
1909	New Zealand	1	0	0	0	0

Daniel George Fraser (24 October 1881 - 4 March 1949) was a New Zealand rugby footballer who was part of the professional 1907-1908 New Zealand rugby tour of Great Britain though he did not play in any matches as he was an assistant manager helping Baskiville.

== Early life ==
Daniel George Fraser was born on 24 October 1881 in Wellington, New Zealand. His parents were Alexander Fraser and Janet Taylor.

== Rugby Football ==
Fraser played rugby union for the Petone Rugby Club. He was their secretary as well as playing from 1903 to 1905 before retiring, though he did play in one match late in 1906.

== Boer War ==
During the Boer War, Fraser played for the New Zealand Army Corps team, which was the first New Zealand rugby side to play in South Africa.

== Rugby League ==
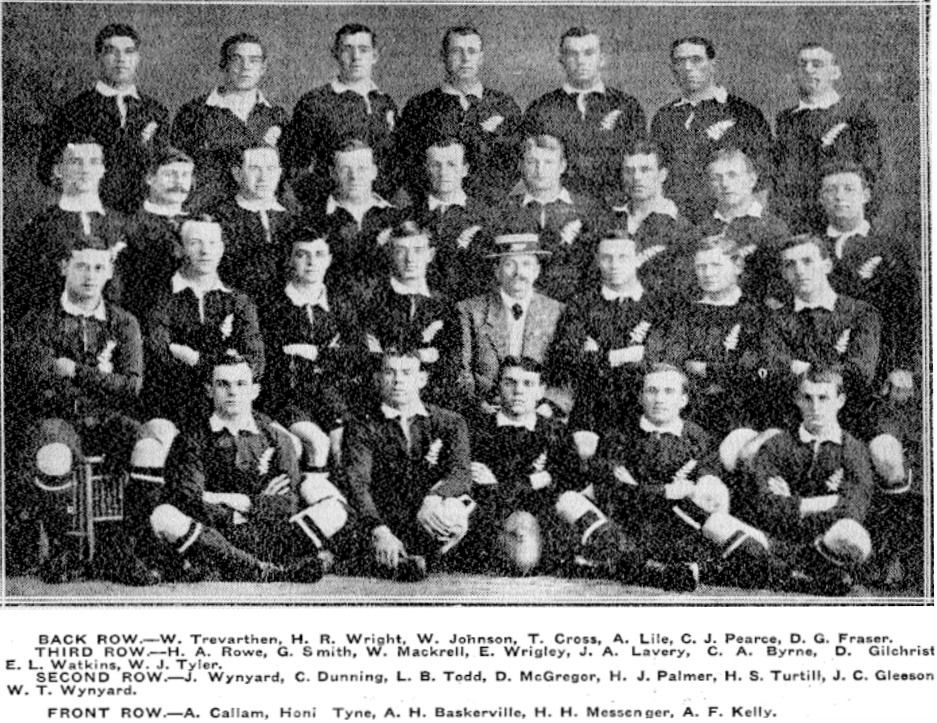
New Zealand Rugby League Team of 1907-08 to Tour England

In 1907 Fraser joined the professional All Blacks while they were in New South Wales on the first leg of their 1907–1908 tour of Australia and Great Britain. Fraser was one of six players on the tour from the Petone Rugby Club. Fraser's main role was a non-playing one, acting as assistant manager and helping Albert Baskiville with his day-to-day duties.

On his return to New Zealand Fraser tried to help fill some of the gap left by the death of Baskiville, helping the game establish itself and he organised the first provincial game of rugby league in New Zealand, between Auckland and Wellington at Victoria Park on 24 August 1908. Fraser also managed the New Zealand team on their first tour of Australia in 1909 and this time he managed to get on the field, playing against Newcastle on 16 June. Indeed the Dominion newspaper of October 9 reported that "D. Fraser, a Petone (Wellington) club forward, visited Sydney with the team, and was included over there. Besides rendering assistance, clerical or otherwise, in conducting the tour, he can play if required. He was on the committee of the Wellington Rugby League and Petone Football Club in 1912.

Like five other members of the touring party Fraser is buried at Karori Cemetery.

== Personal life and death ==
Daniel Fraser married Annice Moore in 1923 (1882-1942). They had a son, Kenneth Daniel Fraser, on 5 June 1925. Kenneth died in 1978. Daniel died on 4 March 1949, aged 67, and was buried at Naenae, Wellington.
