= Billy Mitchell (rugby) =

NZ dual-code rugby international footballer

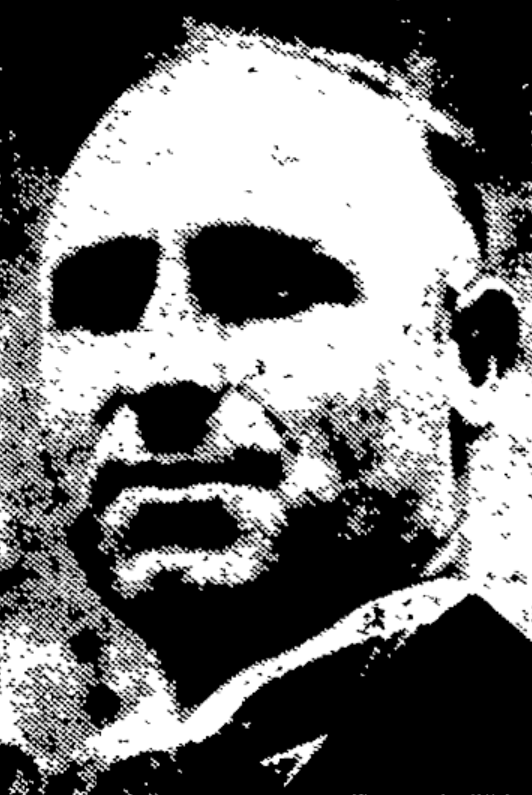

Personal information
- Full name: William James Mitchell
- Born: 28 November 1890; Melbourne, Australia
- Died: 2 June 1959 (aged 68); Christchurch, New Zealand

Playing information
- Weight: 82 kg (181 lb)

Rugby union
- Position: Wing
Club
Years	Team	Pld	T	G	FG	P
	Merivale
Representative
Years	Team	Pld	T	G	FG	P
1909–10	Canterbury	9
1910	New Zealand	2	1	0	0	3

Rugby league
- Position: Fullback, Wing, Stand-off
Club
Years	Team	Pld	T	G	FG	P
1911	North Sydney	5	1	0	0	3
1913–14?	St Albans	11	3	5	2	23
1914	Selected Team	2	0	2	0	4
??–??	Federal
	Total	18	4	7	2	30
Representative
Years	Team	Pld	T	G	FG	P
1911–20	New Zealand	17 (5)	10	1	0	32
1912–14	Canterbury	4	2	0	0	6

Coaching information
Representative
Years	Team	Gms	W	D	L	W%
	Canterbury

William James Mitchell (28 November 1890 – 2 June 1959) was a New Zealand rugby footballer who represented New Zealand in both rugby union and rugby league.

== Early years ==
Mitchell was born in Melbourne, Australia before moving to New Zealand where he worked for the New Zealand Railways Department.

== Rugby union career ==
Mitchell played rugby union for the Merivale club in Christchurch and represented the province nine times in 1909 and 1910. He was selected to be part of the All Blacks tour of Australia in 1910 and played in five matches, including the second and third Test matches.

== Rugby league career ==
In 1911 Mitchell, along with three other players from the Merivale club, moved to Sydney and played for the North Sydney Bears. He was then enticed north by the Queensland Rugby League. At the same time the New Zealand rugby league side was touring Australia and he was invited to join the touring party. Mitchell played in four matches, becoming a dual-code rugby international.

Mitchell then returned to Christchurch and represented Canterbury in its first ever match in 1912. Mitchell toured Australia twice more with New Zealand, in 1913, and as captain in 1919. He played in his last match for New Zealand in 1920. He played for the St Albans and Federal clubs in the Canterbury Rugby League competition.

== Later years ==
Mitchell later served as a coach of the Canterbury side and a national selector.
