= Rugby League Cup =

New Zealand competition

The Rugby League Cup is a New Zealand rugby league trophy that is contested between districts on a challenge basis. The trophy is used to be known as the Northern Union Challenge Cup.

It is the oldest rugby league competition in New Zealand.

== History ==
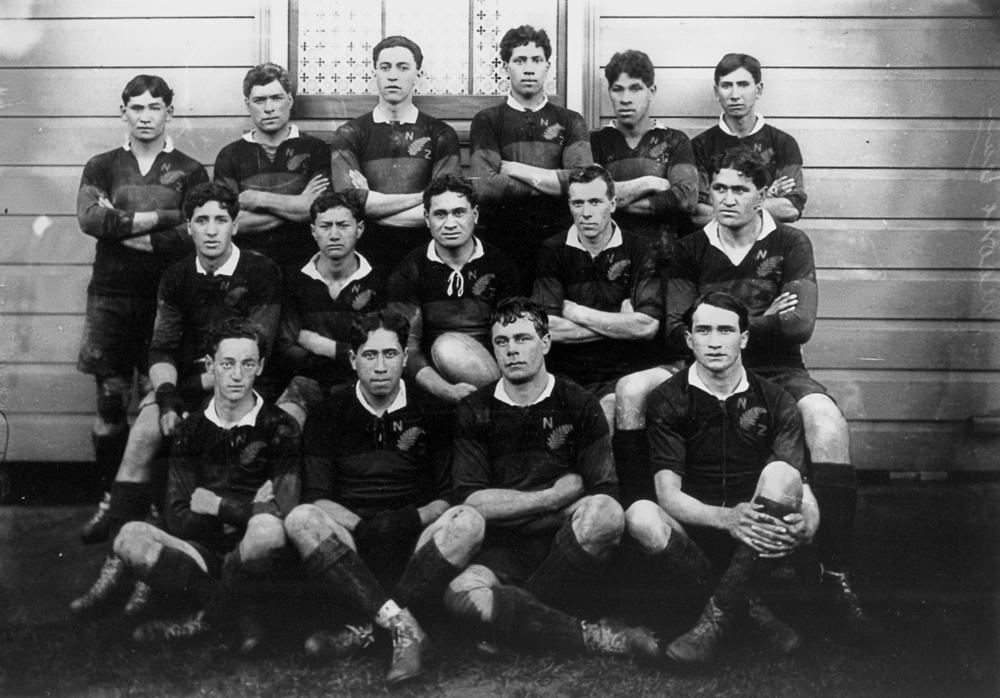
New Zealand rugby league team in 1913

New Zealand rugby league was born with events such as the All Golds tour of England, and matches in Wellington and Auckland in 1908. John Coffey writes in Te Ara, "The Auckland Rugby League was formed in July 1909, and North Shore played City as the forerunner to an inter-club competition that started in 1910. By this time, league was also being played in Taranaki, Rotorua, Hawke’s Bay, Nelson, Marlborough and Southland."

The Cup was made in Bradford and donated to Auckland for inter-provincial competition by the touring 1910 Great Britain Lions.

The Cup was first contested in 1911, when Auckland successfully defended it four times. The Cup was held by Auckland until 1922.

Auckland are the current holders of the Cup after they defeated Canterbury in a one-off match on 4 June 2012. This was marked as a "centennial" match.

== Past winners ==
=== Year by year ===
Year	Champions
1910	Auckland
1911	Auckland
1912	Auckland
1913	Auckland
1914	Auckland
1915	Auckland
1916	Auckland
1917	Auckland
1918	Auckland
1919	Auckland
1920	Auckland
1921	Auckland
1922	South Auckland
1923	South Auckland
1924	South Auckland
1925	South Auckland; Auckland
1926	Auckland
1927	Auckland; South Auckland
1928	South Auckland; Auckland (June)
1929	Auckland
1930	South Auckland
1931	North Auckland
1932	South Auckland
1933	West Coast
1934	West Coast; Canterbury (18 August)
1935	Canterbury
1936	Canterbury; West Coast
1937	West Coast
1938	West Coast

Year	Champions
World War II
1946	West Coast
1947	West Coast; Wellington
1948	Wellington
1949	Wellington
1950	Auckland
1951	Auckland
1952	Auckland; Wellington; Auckland
1953	Auckland
1954	Auckland
1955	Auckland; West Coast; Auckland
1956	Auckland
1957	Auckland
1958	Auckland
1959	Auckland
1960	Auckland; West Coast; Auckland
1961	Auckland
1962	Auckland; Canterbury; West Coast
1963	West Coast; Canterbury
1964	Canterbury; Auckland
1965	Auckland
1966	Auckland
1967	Auckland
1968	Auckland; West Coast; Canterbury
1969	Renamed Rugby League Cup.: Canterbury; West Coast
1970	West Coast; Canterbury

Year	Champions
1971	Canterbury; Wellington; West Coast
1972	West Coast
1973	West Coast
1974	West Coast; Canterbury
1975	Canterbury; Taranaki; Waikato
1976	Waikato
1977	Taranaki
1978	Taranaki
1979	Taranaki
1980	Wellington; Canterbury
1981	Canterbury
1982	Canterbury; Wellington
1983	Wellington
1984	Wellington
1985	Wellington; Taranaki; Canterbury
1986	Canterbury; Auckland
1987	Auckland
1988	Auckland
1989	Auckland
1990	Auckland; Canterbury (29 April); Wellington
1991	Wellington; Auckland; Canterbury
1992	Canterbury; Wellington (17 May); Canterbury

Year	Champions
1993	Canterbury
1994	Canterbury
1995	Canterbury; Auckland
1996	Auckland
1997	Auckland; Canterbury (June); Waikato (12 October)
1998	Waikato
1999	Waikato; Taranaki (24 April)
2000	Taranaki; Coastline
2001	Coastline; Tasman
2002	Tasman; Otago (8 September)
2003	Otago
2004	Otago
2005	Gisborne Tairawhiti
2006	Gisborne Tairawhiti
2007	Gisborne Tairawhiti; Hawke's Bay (15 September); Canterbury
2008	Canterbury; Auckland (28 September)
2009	Auckland; Canterbury (23 August)
2010	Canterbury
2011	Canterbury
2012	Auckland (4 June)
