= Canterbury rugby league team =

New Zealand rugby team

Club information
- Full name: Canterbury Rugby League Football Club
- Nickname(s): Bulls, Reds
- Colours: Red; Black
- Founded: 1912
- Exited: 2009

Former details
- Ground: Orangetheory Stadium, Christchurch
- Coach: Andrew Auimatagi
- Competition: National Competition

Records
- Premierships: 1975, 1993, 2014
- Runners-up: 1997, 1998
- Bartercard Cup: 2000, 2003
- Bartercard Premiership: 2009
- Rugby League Cup: 1934–35, 1962, 1963–64, 1968–69, 1970–71, 1974–75, 1980–82, 1985–86, 1990, 1991–92, 1992, 1993–94, 1997, 2007, 2009–2012

The Canterbury rugby league team (also known as the Canterbury Bulls) are a rugby league team who represent the Canterbury Rugby League. They currently compete in the Albert Baskerville Trophy. Their home ground is Apollo Projects Stadium in Christchurch.

== History ==
=== Early history ===

Canterbury played its first match on 7 September 1912 against Wellington at the Show Grounds, losing 4–5. The following weekend the hosted the touring New South Wales side and lost 5–28. Included in the Canterbury team was captain Charlie Pearce, Jim Auld, Abbie Shadbolt, Billy Mitchell, Bill Bussell and David McPhail.

Canterbury's first win was in their third match, against Hawke's Bay, with Canterbury winning 10–8 in Napier. Jim Auld and Abbie Shadbolt scored tries and Shadbolt kicked two goals.

=== Touring teams ===
In 1955 Canterbury defeated the touring French side 24–12. They defeated Great Britain 18–10, in 1990.

=== The 1990s ===
The early nineties saw a Canterbury side that included many future stars. The side was coached by Frank Endacott and included players such as Quentin Pongia, Terry Hermansson, Mark Nixon, Whetu Taewa Aaron Whittaker, Logan Edwards, Brendon Tuuta and Mike Dorreen. With the creation of the Lion Red Cup however, many moved franchises and eventually ended up in Australia or England. Canterbury defeated Auckland in the 1993 final, winning 36–12.

In the Lion Red Cup, from 1994 to 1996, Canterbury Rugby League was represented by the Christchurch City Shiners and the Canterbury Country Cardinals. When this was folded Canterbury reverted to having one representative team, initially called "the Reds". However eventually "the Bulls" was adopted as a nickname and this was used when the Bartercard Cup was formed.

=== Bartercard Cup ===
Between 2000 and 2007 the Bulls played in the now defunct Bartercard Cup. They won two Bartercard Cup trophies, in 2000 and 2003. In addition, they were defeated in the last seconds of the 2004 final. This makes them one of the most successful teams in the competition, alongside the Mt Albert Lions. Out of the seven seasons they only missed the finals once, in 2002.

The Bulls were the only team from the South Island to ever compete in the Bartercard Cup and were the only club to compete in every season. During this time they were coached by Ged Stokes and Phil Prescott.

| Season | Pld | W | D | L | PF | PA | PD | Pts | Position (Teams) | Finals |
|---|---|---|---|---|---|---|---|---|---|---|
| 2000 | 22 | 15 | 0 | 7 | 658 | 525 | 133 | 30 | Second (Twelve) | Champions |
| 2001 | 22 | 14 | 1 | 7 | 882 | 489 | 393 | 29 | Third (Twelve) | Defeated in Preliminary Final |
| 2002 | 16 | 5 | 0 | 11 | 386 | 531 | −145 | 10 | Tenth (Twelve) | N/A |
| 2003 | 16 | 13 | 0 | 3 | 648 | 370 | 278 | 26 | Minor Premiers (Twelve) | Champions |
| 2004 | 16 | 9 | 0 | 7 | 562 | 374 | 188 | 18 | Fifth (Twelve) | Defeated in Elimination Play-off |
| 2005 | 16 | 11 | 0 | 5 | 543 | 388 | 155 | 22 | Second (Twelve) | Runners-up |
| 2006 | 18 | 13 | 0 | 5 | 583 | 376 | 207 | 26 | Second (Ten) | Runners-up |
| 2007 | 18 | 12 | 0 | 6 | 659 | 430 | 229 | 24 | Third (Ten) | Defeated in Preliminary Final |

==== 2006 results ====
They finished second in the 2006 season standings and defeated the Waitakere Rangers 26–20 in the non-elimination Semi-final. This qualified them for the Qualifying Semi-final which they lost to the Auckland Lions 27–14 at Western Springs Stadium. They bounced back in the preliminary final, smashing the Tamaki Leopards 30–6 but could not defeat the Lions, losing the Grand Final 25–18.

| 2006 Finals Series | Winner | | Loser |
|---|---|---|---|---|
| Preliminary Semi-final | Canterbury Bulls | 26 | Waitakere Rangers | 20 |
| Qualification Semi-final | Auckland Lions | 27 | Canterbury Bulls | 14 |
| Preliminary Final | Canterbury Bulls | 30 | Tamaki Leopards | 6 |
| Grand Final | Auckland Lions | 25 | Canterbury Bulls | 18 |

==== 2007 results ====
Before the start of the 2007 season legendary coach Philip Prescott retired and was replaced by former New Zealand national rugby league team prop Brent Stuart. The Bulls finished the regular season in 3rd place. The highlight of the season was a 72–8 thrashing of the Waicoa Bay Stallions. The Bulls lost the Preliminary Final to Harbour League.

| Date | Match | Winner | | Loser | | Venue |
|---|---|---|---|---|---|---|
| 25 August | Elimination Semi-final | Canterbury Bulls | 35 | Waitakere Rangers | 18 | Waitemata Stadium |
| 1 September | Preliminary Final | Harbour League | 28 | Canterbury Bulls | 24 | Waitemata Stadium |

=== Bartercard Premiership ===
In 2008 and 2009 they played in the Bartercard Premiership where they made both grand finals. They finished minor premiers both years and defeated Auckland in the 2009 final.

=== Current ===
In 2010 the team was replaced in national competitions by one represented the new South Island Zone. Canterbury lost the Rugby League Cup to Auckland on Queen's Birthday 2012, after holding it since 2009.

In 2013 the Canterbury Bulls were added to the Albert Baskerville Trophy, replacing the South Island Scorpions. Until 2016 the Bulls represented the entire South Island and were able to select players from the other South Island districts.

== Rugby League Tour Matches ==
Since 1912, Canterbury had been a frequent stop for international touring rugby league teams.

| Game | Date | Result | Venue | Attendance | Notes |
|---|---|---|---|---|---|
| 1 | 14 September 1912 | NSW Firsts def. Canterbury 28–15 | Addington Showgrounds | 4,200 | 1912 NSW Tour of New Zealand |
| 2 | 23 August 1913 | NSW Firsts def. Canterbury 45–5 | Addington Showgrounds | 4,000 | 1913 NSW Tour of New Zealand |
| 3 | 9 August 1920 | Northern Union def. Canterbury 29–14 | Addington Showgrounds | 3,000 | 1920 Great Britain Lions tour |
| 4 | 16 August 1924 | England def. Canterbury 47–10 | Addington Showgrounds | 7,000 | 1924 Great Britain Lions tour |
| 5 | 26 September 1925 | Qld Firsts def. Canterbury 57–15 | Monica Park Speedway, | | 1925 Queensland tour of New Zealand |
| 6 | 7 October 1925 | Qld Firsts def. Canterbury 58–10 | Monica Park Speedway | | 1925 Queensland tour of New Zealand |
| 7 | 28 July 1951 | France def. Canterbury 13–7 | Addington Showgrounds | 6,990 | 1951 French tour of Australasia |
| 8 | 15 August 1953 | Canterbury def. USA 39–8 | Addington Showgrounds | 5,000 | 1953 American All-Stars tour |
| 9 | 7 August 1954 | Great Britain def. Canterbury 60–14 | Addington Showgrounds | 1,544 | 1954 Great Britain Lions tour |
| 10 | 30 July 1955 | Canterbury def. France 24–12 | Lancaster Park | 2,200 | 1955 French tour of Australasia |
| 11 | 2 August 1958 | Great Britain def. Canterbury 21–41 | Lancaster Park | 6,000 | 1958 Great Britain Lions tour |
| 12 | 30 July 1960 | France def. Canterbury 15–8 | Addington Showgrounds | 7,529 | 1960 French tour of Australasia |
| 13 | 2 August 1962 | Great Britain def. Canterbury 26–5 | Lancaster Park | 2,500 | 1962 Great Britain Lions tour |
| 14 | 15 May 1965 | NSW Country Firsts def. Canterbury 32–10 | Addington Showgrounds | 3,000 | 1965 NSW Country tour of New Zealand |
| 15 | 12 June 1965 | Australia def. Canterbury 19–4 | Addington Showgrounds | 2,654 | 1965 Kangaroo tour of New Zealand |
| 16 | 29 May 1966 | NSW Country Firsts def. Canterbury 21–12 | Addington Showgrounds | | 1966 NSW Country tour of New Zealand |
| 17 | 13 August 1966 | Great Britain def. Canterbury 53–6 | Lancaster Park | 1,192 | 1966 Great Britain Lions tour |
| 18 | 6 May 1970 | NSW Country Firsts def. Canterbury 38–12 | Addington Showgrounds | | 1970 NSW Country tour of New Zealand |
| 19 | 5 June 1972 | Qld Firsts def. Canterbury 21–11 | Addington Showgrounds | | 1972 Queensland tour of New Zealand |
| 20 | 5 May 1974 | NSW Country Firsts def. Canterbury 34–11 | Addington Showgrounds | | 1974 NSW Country tour of New Zealand |
| 21 | 24 June 1975 | Wales def. Canterbury 25–18 | Addington Showgrounds | 2,500 | Welsh 1975 Rugby League World Cup tour |
| 22 | 13 June 1990 | Canterbury def. Great Britain 18–10 | Addington Showgrounds | 3,000 | 1990 Great Britain Lions tour |
| 23 | 15 July 1992 | Great Britain def. Canterbury 17–6 | Lancaster Park | 3,021 | 1992 Great Britain Lions tour |
