= Wellington rugby league team =

New Zealand representative rugby league team

Club information
- Nickname(s): Orcas
- Colours: Black; Yellow
- Founded: 1908
- Website: http://websites.sportstg.com/assoc_page.cgi?assoc=4979

Current details
- Ground(s): Porirua Park; Wise Park
- CEO: Andre Whittaker
- Coach: Steve Moafanua Stevenson, Matt Kilgour, Stephen Gallagher
- Competition: National Competition
- NZRL Competition: N/A

Records
- Premierships: 1970
- Rugby League Cup: 1947–49, 1952, 1971, 1980, 1982–84, 1990, 1992

The Wellington Rugby League Team (also known as the Wellington Orcas) are a rugby league team that represents the Wellington Rugby League in New Zealand Rugby League competitions. They currently compete in the National Competition.

== History ==
=== 1908–1988: Early years ===
Wellington played its first game on 24 August 1908 when they took on Auckland at Victoria Park, Auckland in the first provincial game of rugby league in New Zealand.

The following All Golds played for Wellington in that first match: Edward Tyne, Hercules Richard Wright, Tom Cross, Conrad Byrne, Daniel Gilchrist, Daniel Fraser and James Barber.

During 1909, 1910 and 1911 Wellington continued to play a number of provincial games, and in 1909 defeated Auckland, in Auckland 22–19, the first of only five victories over Auckland in over 100 years.

In 1912 Wellington played in its first international match, losing to the touring New South Wales side, 45–13 in a game played at the Zoological Gardens.

They defeated Auckland 33–18 on 27 September 1913. It was not until 1988 that they were again victorious over an Auckland side. The 1913 side was: A.Anderson, B.Whitley, W.Kelly, A.House (Petone), G.Bradley (Athletic), K.George, J.Barber, Jim Parker (Petone), J.Spencer, T.Turner, A.Bensmann, L.Campbell (Newtown), W.Wilson (Athletic). Bench: H.McGuire, B.Childs.

During the 1951 French rugby league tour of Australasia the Wellington side hosted a match against the tourists.

During the 1988 Great Britain Lions tour, Wellington were defeated by the Britons 18 – 24 at Porirua Park before a crowd of 4,428.

=== 1989–1990: Rugby League Cup ===
On several occasions Wellington has held the Rugby League Cup (previously known as the Northern Union Cup 1910–1969) for interprovincial competition played on a challenge basis. Wellington won it off the West Coast in 1947 for the first time and held it for three years. Wellington held it last in 1990.

=== 1990–1994: Great Britain Tour ===
In 1990 Wellington defeated the touring Great Britain side 30–22. This was Wellington's first, and to date only, win over a touring side.

=== 1994–1996: Lion Red Cup ===
Between 1994 and 1996, Wellington was represented by the Wellington City Dukes and Hutt Valley Firehawks in the Lion Red Cup. One player from the Dukes, Earl Va'a, later went on to represent Samoa in Rugby union. Both teams folded along with the competition in 1996.

Team	Season	Pld	W	D	L	PF	PA	PD	Pts	Position	Finals
Hutt Valley	1994	22	9	0	13	458	489	−30	18	Eighth	N/A
Wellington City	1994	22	8	0	14	470	508	−38	16	Ninth	N/A
Hutt Valley	1995	22	13	0	9	544	443	101	26	Fifth	Lost Elimination Play-off
Wellington City	1995	22	10	2	10	440	514	−74	22	Seventh	N/A
Hutt Valley	1996	22	11	2	9	444	469	−25	24	Sixth	N/A
Wellington City	1996	22	9	0	13	536	532	4	18	Eighth	N/A

=== 2002–2007: Bartercard Cup ===
Wellington Orcas
Club information
- Founded: 2002
- Exited: 2008

Former details
- Ground(s): Basin Reserve; Porirua Park; Hutt Recreation Ground
- Coach: Paul Bergman

In 2000 and 2001 the region was represented in the Bartercard Cup by the Porirua Pumas and Wainuiomata Lions. However, in 2002 it was decided that one team was needed in the competition. They narrowly missed out on a finals spot in 2002, being on equal points but with a lower For and Against than the Marist Richmond Brothers. Unfortunately this was a high point for the franchise with the team never making the play-offs.

The Orca nickname was adopted for the 2006 season, adopting the name from the Southern Orcas consortium – a group attempting to gain an expansion National Rugby League competition licence that was instead granted to the Gold Coast Titans group. Previously they were known as Wellington Franchise.

Notable players included Ben Matulino and Simon Mannering.

Season	Pld	W	D	L	PF	PA	PD	Pts	Position (Teams)	Finals
2002	16	9	1	6	547	449	98	19	Sixth (Twelve)	N/A
2003	16	4	1	11	460	646	−186	6*	Eleventh (Twelve)	N/A
2004	16	8	1	7	465	409	56	17	Sixth (Twelve)	N/A
2005	16	5	3	8	418	459	−41	13	Eighth (Twelve)	N/A
2006	18	6	0	12	452	549	−97	12	Seventh (Ten)	N/A
2007	18	10	0	8	509	529	−20	20	Sixth (10)	N/A

*Wellington were docked three points for registration infringements.

=== 2008–2009: Bartercard Premiership ===
Wellington Rugby League were awarded a place in the new six-team National Provincial Competition. The team plays its home matches at Porirua Park.

Season	Pld	W	D	L	PF	PA	PD	Pts	Position	Finals
2008	5	2	1	2	146	138	8	5	Fourth	N/A
2009	5	2	0	3	142	120	22	4	Fourth	Lost semi-final

=== 2010–present: NZRL National Competition ===
Wellington was put in the NZRL National Competition after the Bartercard Premiership disbanded. Wellington were called the "Wellington Orcas" through the competition.

== Rugby League Tour Matches ==
Wellington has also been a frequent stop for touring international rugby league teams. Of the 28 games Wellington has played against touring teams, only in the 28th and last game to date (as of 2024) did the Orcas win, defeating Great Britain 30–22 in front of just 800 fans at the Basin Reserve on 27 June 1990.

Game	Date	Result	Venue	Attendance	Notes
1	4 October 1912	New South Wales def. Wellington 45–13	Zoological Gardens	4,000	1912 NSW Tour of New Zealand
2	13 September 1913	New South Wales def. Wellington 34–18	Newtown Park	10,000	1913 NSW Tour of New Zealand
3	11 July 1914	Northern Union def. Wellington 14–7	Newtown Park	5,000	1914 Great Britain Lions tour
4	4 October 1919	Australia def. Wellington 93–5	Newtown Park	1,000	1919 Kangaroo tour of New Zealand
5	29 July 1936	England def. Wellington 48–8	Basin Reserve		1936 Great Britain Lions tour
6	30 July 1951	France def. Wellington 26–13	Basin Reserve	8,602	1951 French Tour of Australasia
7	7 August 1953	American All-Stars def. Wellington 17–8	Basin Reserve		1953 American All-Stars tour
8	27 July 1954	Great Britain def. Wellington 61–18	Basin Reserve	3,103	1954 Great Britain Lions tour
9	2 August 1955	France def. Wellington 19–14	Basin Reserve	4,000	1955 French Tour of Australasia
10	30 July 1958	Great Britain def. Wellington 26–13	Basin Reserve	8,602	1958 Great Britain Lions tour
11	27 July 1960	France def. Wellington 41–3	Wellington Showgrounds	1,701	1960 French Tour of Australasia
12	21 June 1961	Australia def. Wellington 61–3	Basin Reserve	707	1961 Kangaroo tour of New Zealand
13	1 August 1963	South Africa def. Wellington 21–12	Basin Reserve		1963 South Africa Tour of Australasia
14	28 July 1964	France def. Wellington 18–12	Basin Reserve	1,301	1964 French Tour of Australasia
15	9 June 1965	Australia def. Wellington 34–16	Basin Reserve	1,745	1965 Kangaroo tour of New Zealand
16	9 August 1966	Great Britain def. Wellington 28–9	Basin Reserve	1,142	1966 Great Britain Lions tour
17	4 June 1969	Australia def. Wellington 48–7	Basin Reserve	1,415	1969 Kangaroo tour of New Zealand
18	14 July 1970	Great Britain def. Wellington 60–8	Basin Reserve	859	1970 Great Britain Lions tour
19	3 June 1972	Queensland def. Wellington 26–3	Basin Reserve		1973 QLD Tour of New Zealand
20	1 August 1974	Great Britain def. Wellington 39–11	Basin Reserve	5,000	1974 Great Britain Lions tour
21	18 June 1975	Wales def. Wellington 52–8	Basin Reserve	2,000	Wales 1975 Rugby League World Cup tour
22	7 June 1977	France def. Wellington 8–0	Basin Reserve	1,500	France 1977 Rugby League World Cup tour
23	29 July 1979	Great Britain def. Wellington 39–3	Petone Recreation Ground	2,000	1979 Great Britain Lions tour
24	25 September 1983	Papua New Guinea def. Wellington 62–16	Basin Reserve		1983 Papua New Guinea Kumuls tour
25	13 July 1988	Great Britain def. Wellington 39–3	Porirua Park	4,428	1988 Great Britain Lions tour
26	2 October 1988	Australia def. Wellington 24–12	Basin Reserve	2,000	1988 Australia Rugby League World Cup Final tour
27	19 July 1989	Australia def. Wellington 28–10	Basin Reserve	5,000	1989 Kangaroo tour of New Zealand
28	27 June 1990	Wellington def. Great Britain 30–22	Basin Reserve	800	1990 Great Britain Lions tour
