= George Iles =

NZ international rugby league footballer

Personal information
- Full name: George Frederick Iles
- Born: 28 March 1894 Invercargill, New Zealand
- Died: 27 March 1933 (aged 38) Tauranga, New Zealand

Playing information
- Position: Wing, Centre
Club
Years	Team	Pld	T	G	FG	P
1915–16	Grafton Athletic	13	1	0	0	3
1916–19	Newton Rangers	43	34	7	0	116
1922	Tauranga	2	1	0	0	3
	Total	58	36	7	0	122
Representative
Years	Team	Pld	T	G	FG	P
1918–19	Auckland	4	5	0	0	15
1919	New Zealand	4	1	0	0	3
1922	Bay of Plenty	2	1	0	0	3

Rugby union career
Senior career
Years	Team	Apps	(Points)
1920-22	Tauranga (Club)	16	(27)
1923-26	Cadets Old Boys (Tau.)	25	(18)
1929-30	Athletic (Tau.)	8	(18)
International career
Years	Team	Apps	(Points)
1920-29	Tauranga (Rep)	32	(27)
1920	Auckland	1	(0)
1920-25	Bay of Plenty	6	(9)

George Iles (28 March 1894 – 27 March 1933) was a winger and centre who played for the New Zealand rugby league team. He debuted for them in 1919 and became Kiwi number 125. He played his club rugby league for the Grafton Athletic and Newton Rangers teams in the Auckland Rugby League competition. He later moved to Tauranga and played for Tauranga and Bay of Plenty at rugby union including against the touring Springbok team in 1921. In 1922 he made an effort to establish Rugby League in the Tauranga area which failed however he did play matches for Tauranga and a Bay of Plenty league team who played against Auckland and the touring New South Wales team.

== Early life ==
George Iles grew up in Christchurch. He was the son of Harriet and Albert Iles, whose parents had come to New Zealand in one of the First Four Ships, which brought settlers to Canterbury. Albert was a successful sportsman in his own right captaining the Sydenham Football Club in the 1880s and representing Canterbury and Southland for several years. He was also a champion runner. George had a brother, Arthur Norman Iles (1891-1946) who also played rugby league with George, and Eric Reginald Iles (1894-1981). In 1912 the family moved to Auckland where they lived until 1919.

== Rugby league and rugby union playing career ==
=== Auckland and New Zealand rugby league ===
George Iles began his playing career for Grafton Athletic with his name first appearing in a team list for their second grade team in 1914 along with his brother Arthur Iles. He was mentioned as having scored a try in an 18-3 loss against Northcote Ramblers on 20 June.

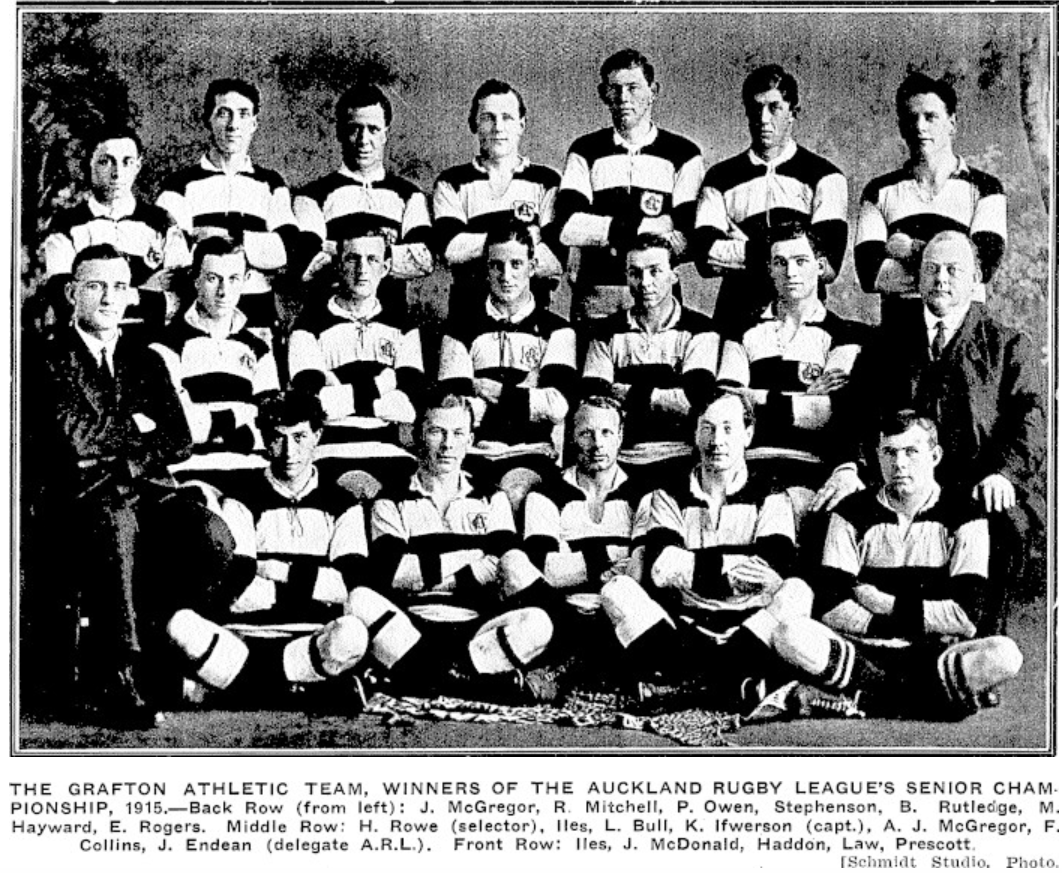

The following season he debuted for the Grafton senior team and played in the Auckland first grade competition. He was fortunate to play alongside the likes of New Zealand rugby league legends Karl Ifwersen and Dougie McGregor, the later having already played for the All Blacks rugby team. Grafton won the Auckland title this season.

Both George and Arthur transferred to the Newton Rangers club for the 1916 season. Newton struggled and finished last however Iles did score 7 out of Newton's 20 tries making him the second highest try scorer for the entire competition. The following year he went even better scoring 12 tries and leading the try scorer lists in the 1917 competition.

In 1918 Iles scored 4 tries for Newton and was also elected secretary of the club at their annual meeting. He gained his first representative jersey when he was selected for the Auckland team for, at that time, a very rare representative fixture. During the war years the Auckland Rugby League had deliberately played almost no representative matches. The match was against Canterbury and played at the Auckland Domain in front of 10,000 spectators. Auckland won 45–9 with Iles scoring a try in the corner "after a cross-field run".

In 1919 Iles was the captain of the Newton senior team. Once again he was a prolific try scorer for Newton scoring 10 tries in total including tries in the Roope Rooster semi final against Ponsonby United, and the semi-final replay against the same opponents when the first match was abandoned near the end after Ponsonby fans encroached on the field and refused to move. Newton went on to win the Roope Rooster competition for the first time in their club's history.

Iles was picked to play for Auckland against New Zealand on 24 May. It was the first of 3 games he would play for them this season. The match was a warmup for the Australian tour for the New Zealand side and was won by New Zealand 25–19 in front of 8,000 spectators at the Auckland Domain. His next appearance was against the Returned Soldiers team as part of the Peace Day celebration program. It was held at the Auckland Domain on 20 July and featured athletics, rugby union, rugby league, football, and hockey matches. The Returned Soldiers team won 26–24 with Iles scoring two second half tries for the losing Auckland team. His last ever match in an Auckland jersey was played against Hawke's Bay at Eden Park on 9 August with 9,000 in attendance. Iles scored two tries in the match. The first was after receiving a pass from Bert Laing and "cutting in neatly and scoring", while his second saw him picking up the ball in the open "outpacing the opposition and swerving past McCarthy [to score] a good try".

Iles made his New Zealand debut two weeks later. He played all of his 4 matches for New Zealand in 4 consecutive weekends. New Zealand had sent a touring team to Australia where they had played 11 matches against various teams but no tests. After this tour they returned home and Australia sent a touring team to New Zealand. Iles had played in a trial on 14 May to make the tour but was not selected.

On 23 August he played his first test for New Zealand at the Basin Reserve in Wellington and went down 21–44 in front of 8,000 spectators. Iles had a happier time of it in the second test which New Zealand won at Sydenham Park in Christchurch. He scored a try where "following an exchange of kicks between the two full-backs the New Zealanders swept down in a line and Iles got over", this made the score 21–2 to New Zealand. They would go on to win 26–10 in front of 6,000 fans. The third test was played in Auckland at the Domain with a huge crowd of 24,300 present to see New Zealand go down 23–34. While Iles 4th and final appearance for New Zealand came at the Auckland Domain once again with New Zealand being trounced 2–32 to lose the series 1–3. He was listed to play in the reserves a week later for the Auckland team to play Australia but he did not take the field in a match lost 8–32.

=== Move to Tauranga and switch to rugby union ===
In 1920 George Iles moved to Tauranga with his family. Rugby league was not played in the Bay of Plenty area and so he largely played rugby union over the following decade for Tauranga and the Bay of Plenty representative team. In July 1920 he played for Tauranga against Grammar Old Boys. It was said "of the Tauranga team the Isles [sic] brothers, three quarters, played well, and if supported by other members of the back division, would have made things a bit more awkward for the visitors. They both handled the ball well". In a bizarre situation Iles played for Auckland against his own Bay of Plenty union in a match on 31 July when an Auckland back was unable to make the trip to Tauranga and Iles was asked to take his place. Bay of Plenty won 17–10 but Iles played brilliantly and comment was made that he shouldn't have been left out of the Bay team in the first place. In September Iles made a return to Eden Park, this time in a Bay of Plenty rugby jersey where they were defeated 17–34 by Auckland. Iles set up Bay of Plenty's first try and then scored two others himself.

Iles was playing for the Tauranga Football Club in the Jordan Cup competition for clubs and he also regularly appeared for the Tauranga representative team in Kusab Cup fixtures. His debut season in the code continued to be an impressive one. In a match for Tauranga against Te Puke in the Kusab Cup he ran in 3 tries in a 9–6 win . During the 1921 Kusab Cup he played in matches against Mercury Bay, Te Puke, Whakatane in the semi-final, and Rotorua in the final. Tauranga won the Cup when they defeated Rotorua 16–9 at Arawa Park, Rotorua after several years of trying with Iles captaining the team.

Iles greatest achievement of the year was on 16 August when he was selected to play for Bay of Plenty against the touring Springbok team. The match was played at Rotorua with 5,000 spectators present to witness the Springboks win by 17 points to 9. Iles helped set up the Bay of Plenty side's only try to David Werahiko Borell when Montgomery "sent the ball across to Iles who opened up splendidly, and the ball came across to Borell, who scored near the corner".

=== Effort to introduce rugby league to Tauranga ===
Despite these fine rugby achievements it appears that Iles had not forgotten his rugby league background. He was part of an effort to establish rugby league in the Tauranga area in 1922. The Tauranga Rugby League was started and they looked to play rugby league teams from other areas. The league was officially formed in March 1922. They made efforts to organise a game with the newly formed Rotorua league team. On 12 April he wrote a letter to the Bay of Plenty Times about the strength of the rugby league code in various places and was writing in response to a query about why rugby league had been started in the area by Mr. Phelan, a past member of the Tauranga rugby selection committee. Iles responded in a lengthy letter "the answer is the same as that to why the League game was first commenced – that is dissatisfaction with Rugby management", he went on to say "touching on the standard of play in League, as one who has played both codes I give it as my opinion that League is played on a far higher standard in Australia and Auckland than Rugby". He was still playing rugby union through this period and played for Tauranga in a drawn match with Rangataua in June . On 28 August he wrote another letter suggesting a match between those players who had been selected for the Tauranga rugby union team and those who had not as there had evidently been some controversy over selections.

On 16 September history was made in Tauranga with the first ever game of rugby league played there. Tauranga took on the Rotorua team on the Tauranga Domain. As well as George Iles playing, David Borell and Arthur Iles also played in the match. Rotorua won a high scoring match 29–28 with both Iles and Borell scoring tries.

A game against the touring New South Wales was also arranged which was a remarkable achievement in itself given that rugby league was not even played in the area until a month earlier. The match was between New South Wales and Bay of Plenty. George Iles naturally played and the team also featured future Kiwi George Gardiner while the visiting NSW team featured the likes of Frank Burge and Reg Latta. New South Wales won the match 29 points to 5 with Borell scoring a try and Joseph Rogers kicking a goal for the local team .

On 30 September Tauranga again made history by playing in the first ever rugby league game in Te Puke. Efforts were then made to arrange a match with an Auckland team and this eventuated with Auckland sending a very strong team down to play in Tauranga on 7 October. It wasn't a Tauranga side who took on Auckland rather a Bay of Plenty team with players from throughout the district. George Iles captained the Bay of Plenty side and they performed well only going down 27–33 to an Auckland team which featured a large number of New Zealand international players such as Clarrie Polson, Wally Somers, and future Kiwi's Lou Brown, Neville St George, and Jim O'Brien. Iles scored a try against his former team.

In September Iles went on the attack again, this time in response to the suggestion by rugby supporters that league players were being paid. He was writing as a member of Tauranga Rugby League and challenged "any member of the Rugby Union to produce evidence of proof of any monetary benefits received by players or officers of the Tauranga Rugby League. If this can be done I will donate £50 to any charity benefit. On 14 October Tauranga played a match on the Waihi Recreation Ground and lost 6–19 in front of a large attendance, Iles again leading the Tauranga team. These efforts to grow the game in the area, while somewhat remarkable, ultimately proved futile and Iles returned to the rugby union field the following season.

=== Back to rugby union ===
In 1923 he played for Tauranga rugby team against Te Puke in Te Puke and then again in the return match in Tauranga. He was also turning out for the Cadets Old Boys senior side in the club competition. He scored 2 tries for Cadets in an 11–8 win over Rangataua. In 1924 he played several matches for Tauranga, including 2 Kusab's Cup matches against Te Puke drawn 6–6, and won by Tauranga 8–6 . They then beat Whakatane in the semi-final. On 2 August Karl Ifwersen brought down a team from Auckland from the Grammar Old Boys, College Rifles and Ponsonby clubs to play against a Tauranga XV captained by George Iles. The Auckland team won the match 14–8 . In the final of the Kusab's Cup Iles captained Tauranga to victory 17–9 over Rotorua with Iles scoring a try . This was just the second time Tauranga had won the cup. On 16 August Iles captained the Bay of Plenty representative team in an 11–13 loss to Opotiki and a match with Poverty Bay in Gisborne. Poverty Bay won easily by 23 points to 9.

Iles continued to captain Tauranga in 1925, including matches against Te Puke in June 1925, and Rangitaiki where they won 12–5 with Iles involved prominently throughout the match. At the end of the rugby season he joined the Tauranga Rowing Club, being elected a member on 26 September at their AGM .

In 1926 Iles represented Tauranga against Hamilton. He continued to play for the Cadets Old Boys club . He played for Tauranga against Whakatane soon after. The year was to end sadly for Iles though as his father Albert collapsed and died while playing bowls on the Tauranga South bowling green 8 December 1926. He was buried at Purewa Cemetery, in Meadowbank, Auckland. In 1927 and 1928 he took a break from playing but not from the game. He refereed matches in the Jordan Cup senior grade and the juniors.

In July 1929 George Iles brother Arthur (who was a councillor in Tauranga from 1925 to 1938 deputy mayor at one point) wrote a letter to the Bay of Plenty Times defending his brother as a player and coach in the Tauranga representative team. He was writing in reply to the same Mr. Phelan that his brother had written regarding years earlier. Arthur Iles said that he had been covering football in Tauranga for 10 years and "has no recollection of ever noticing Mr Phelan in attendance at any annual general meeting of the Rugby Union".

On 27 July 1929 Tauranga beat Opotiki for the Hurinui Apanui Shield with Iles playing. The Hurinui Apanui Shield was named after the famous Ngatiawa chief who had died in 1924. A week later they defended it against Rotorua with Iles playing five eighth . Despite being 35 years of age by this point Iles was heavily involved in a 17–0 win playing with his "characteristic cleverness" . His younger brother Eric was playing alongside him in the backs through all of these matches. Eric would himself go on the represent the Bay of Plenty rugby team . Iles played again in the defence against Taupo on 24 August which they won 27–11 and again in early September against Opotiki. They drew the match 6–6 with a penalty after the full time bell which meant they retained the shield for the summer as it was the last challenge of the year . At the start of the 1930 season Iles was appointed the backs coach with J. Duncan coaching the forwards for the Tauranga team. His coaching career did not begin well with the team losing the match 3–6 to Te Puke, and the Hurinui Apanui Shield in the process. They did however win it back in the same season defeating Whakatane before holding it against Taupo and Rangitaiki.

Iles was a member of the Athletic Football Club from 1929 onwards with his older brother Arthur on the management committee. They had been named College Old Boys until 1928 when they changed to the Athletic name. Iles was playing for their senior team along with his younger brother Eric. In 1930 George had turned his hand to refereeing in the Jordan Cup for senior club teams. However he was still playing, turning out for Athletic against Cadets in the Jordan Cup and scoring a try in a 6–9 loss. By 1932 George had become the club captain and still writing letters to the Bay of Plenty Times.

== Business life ==
He and his brother Arthur established a wool and hide exporting business based in Tauranga immediately after moving there in 1920 exporting "hides, calf skins, sheepskins, wool, tallow, horsehair etc". They were based on Willow St., Tauranga with depots in Te Puke, Whakatane, and Taneatua and acted as agents for Wilson and Canham.

== Death ==
George Iles died on 27 March 1933 one day before what would have been his 40th birthday, after suffering from a "severe illness". His funeral was held on 29 March with a very large gathering present at the Holy Trinity Church. His pall-bearers were members of various football clubs, namely "Ike Tangitu (Maori Clubs), C. Cameron, J. Duncan and A. Tassell (Athletics Club), and W. Mansel and C. Haua (Cadets Old Boys)". The funeral was also attended by various members of Bay of Plenty organisations including the mayor of Tauranga and representatives of all the football clubs and over two hundred telegrams were received from all over the country.

George Iles was survived by his widow Grace Malven Iles (1903-1981), who he had wed in 1927, and two young sons including Harold Alfred Iles (1930-1992).
