= 1917 Auckland Rugby League season =

The 1917 Auckland Rugby League season was its 9th. Due to the large number of players now serving in the First World War it was agreed to relax transfer rules to allow players from stronger teams to join weaker teams to even the competition. It was noted how many men from various clubs had been killed in battle by the beginning of 1917. They were Cecil Walker, Doug Dawson, T Marshall (Grafton Athletic), Charles Savory, Frank McWhirter (Ponsonby United), Graham Cook (Ponsonby United), N Vause, Victor McCollum, Alf Gault, T Lambert, E Tiernan, F Stubbs, W. G. Handle (Ponsonby United), B Hart, Frederick Gladding, A Powley, Chas Mann (North Shore Albions), William Moeki, G Jones, W Harris, Sam Magee, S Greer (City Rovers), Alan Miller, Charles Sinton, and Leslie O'Leary (Sunnyside). City Rovers had 'sent' ninety men to war by this time and twenty-one had been wounded and five killed. The Sunnyside club had only nine members left and one of those who had gone to the war (William O'Shaughnessey) said that in the trenches he had made a list of league players from various clubs which totaled 120. All three of the Sunnyside secretaries had enlisted and the executive was also gone. Ponsonby had also had over eighty of its members join the war effort.

Preceded by 1916	9th Auckland Rugby League season 1917	Succeeded by 1918

Thirty three teams entered the six grades. This was down on previous seasons due to the number of men who had gone to fight. In the senior grade there were still six teams entered, with five second grade teams, five third grade teams, nine fourth grade teams, six fifth grade teams, and four sixth grade teams. The season was notable for the fact that Otahuhu was forced to drop out of the first grade competition after round 4 as it struggled to field senior players. Grafton Athletic also fell by the way-side soon after for the same reason.

Ponsonby United won the first grade championship for the first time in their history. They also won the Roope Rooster trophy for the first time with a 12–6 win over City Rovers in the final. By winning both competitions they became the second Auckland senior club to win multiple trophies in the same season following on the footsteps of City Rovers who had won both titles the year prior.

== News ==
=== Club teams by grade participation ===
Team	1st Grade	2nd Grade	3rd Grade	4th Grade	5th Grade	6th Grade	Total
City Rovers	1	1	1	1	2	1	7
Newton Rangers	1	1	1	1	0	0	4
Otahuhu Rovers	1	1	0	1	1	0	4
North Shore Albions	1	0	1	0	1	1	4
Ponsonby United	1	1	0	1	0	0	3
Northcote & Birkenhead Ramblers	0	0	1	0	1	0	2
Grafton Athletic	1	0	0	1	0	0	2
Thames Old Boys	0	1	0	1	0	0	2
Richmond Rovers	0	0	0	1	0	1	2
Telegraph Messengers	0	0	0	0	1	1	2
Pupuke	0	0	1	0	0	0	1
Sunnyside	0	0	0	1	0	0	1
Total	6	5	6	8	6	4	35

=== Pupuke club ===
On May 17, 1917 the Pupuke rugby league club was granted affiliation with the Auckland Rugby League at their weekly management meeting. They entered a single team in the 3rd grade competition. The Observer newspaper reported that “Takapuna is the latest recruit to Northern Unionism. Forty-three lads there have formed a club to be known as the Pupuke Club. One team has been entered in the third grade competitions to play in all red jerseys”. In 1921 a club was formed in the same Takapuna area and played until 1925.

=== Representative season ===
At the season end rather than a strong representative program which had been a feature of earlier years several charity and exhibition matches were played instead. These included a match versus the victorious Auckland Rugby Union club champions Railway. The team in its entirety switched to the rugby league code. They played matches with Ponsonby United and City Rovers at the end of the season. The team would go on to struggle for numbers itself in 1918 before eventually amalgamating with Grafton Athletic.

=== Victoria Park ===
In 1916 the fence around Victoria Park had been removed by the council which made it very difficult to collect gate revenue. The league had however secured land which would be developed as Carlaw Park with the aim being to secure the ground and gain revenue from ticket sales in the future.

== First grade championship ==
The 1st grade championship had been competing for the Myers Cup from 1910 to 1914 but after the beginning of the war the league decided to not award trophies though the grade competitions were still competed for as normal. Twenty three first grade season matches were played which was less than previous seasons but because both Otahuhu and Grafton Athletic were forced to drop out of the competition due to a lack of players as a result of so many leaving to join the war effort. After their Round 4 default to North Shore where only two Otahuhu players turned up they decided to amalgamate senior teams with Grafton. This was short lived however as Grafton themselves only lasted until Round 7 when they themselves defaulted a week later. Ponsonby United were crowned champions for the first time in their existence.

=== Statistics ===
Including the knockout games there were 25 first grade games played with 132 tries, 54 conversions, 32 penalties, 1 drop goal, and 3 goals from a mark. The average number of points per game was 23, with 5.3 tries per game. With 54 conversions from 132 attempts the successful percentage was 40.9. The successful conversion percentage went from 38.5 to 40.9. The points per game increased from 18.2 in 1916 to 23.

=== 1st Grade standings ===
Team	Pld	W	D	L	F	A	Pts
Ponsonby United	8	7	0	1	109	51	14
Newton Rangers	9	6	0	3	153	77	12
City Rovers	9	6	0	3	110	71	12
North Shore Albions	9	4	0	5	84	91	8
Grafton Athletic	7	0	0	7	21	144	0
Otahuhu Rovers	4	0	0	4	12	55	0

=== 1st Grade results ===
==== Round 1 ====
The match at Otahuhu saw the kickoff delayed as the home team only had 8 players with several absent through illness. Eventually it got underway and a few players arrived to join the game, though they only ended up with 11. The Grafton club protested at the playing of Arthur Matthews and his brother W. Matthews for the North Shore side when they were registered with Ponsonby. The league decided to order both players to stand down until the matter was resolved and that the match should be replayed at a later date.

19 May	Ponsonby	12–8	Newton	Victoria Park 1
3:00	Try: Spencer Jones, D McCarthy; Con: A Cross 2 Pen: A Cross		Try: Ronald Lovett, Wally Somers; Con: Charles Potier	Referee: Archie Ferguson

19 May	North Shore	14–4	Grafton	Devonport Domain
3:00	Try: Percy Pullen, G Stewart, Stan Walters, Leonard Boon; Pen: Frederick Neighbour		Pen: Karl Ifwersen 2	Referee: Billy Murray

19 May	Otahuhu	2–14	City	Otahuhu 1
3:00	Pen: L Martin		Try: McAubrey 3, Tom Sheehan; Con: Bill Davidson	Referee: Tom Fielding

==== Round 2 ====
Newton, who had themselves struggled in 1916 now found themselves against a depleted Grafton side due to the war. Grafton field what was said to be a "scratch team" with just one senior player and were trounced 43-0. Ernie Asher converted a try from the sideline on full time to win the match for City over North Shore. It came after North Shore took the lead with a try with 5 minutes to go. Then City attacked and a series of scrums were held near the North Shore line. The referee had to stop the game for 2 and a half minutes to clear the field of spectators who were encroaching on the field of play before George Paki secured the ball from a scrum and crossed to level the scores before Asher's goal. It was said that "hat's coats, etc, were thrown in the air by the red barrackers". The Pukekohe & Waiuku Times reported that the match between Otahuhu and Ponsonby at the formers ground was played "on a sodden ground and under very unfavourable weather conditions" and after ten minutes the players were unrecognisable as they were covered in mud.

26 May	City	18–16	North Shore	Victoria Park 1
3:00	Try: Tom Sheehan, Bill Davidson, Herb Lunn, George Paki; Con: Ernie Asher 3		Try: Leonard Boon, Cyril Nicholson, Stan Walters, George Seagar; Pen: Frederick Neighbour, Jim Griffen (mark)	Attendance: 2,500; Referee: Dick Benson

26 May	Newton	43–0	Grafton	Victoria Park 2
3:00	Try: Bill Williams 2, Len Farrant 3, George Iles 3, A McSweeney 2, Charles Potier; Con: Phil Castles, Len Farrant, Charles Potier 2, Wally Somers			Attendance: 2,500; Referee: Stan Weston

26 May	Otahuhu	5–13	Ponsonby	Otahuhu
3:00	Try: Patrick Higgins; Con: Gus Martin		Try: Bill Walsh, A Cross, Arthur Rae; Con: A Cross 2	Referee: T. Hill

==== Round 3 ====
2 June	Ponsonby	15–6	North Shore	Victoria Park 1
3:00	Try: Spencer Jones, Thomas McClymont 2 Con: A Cross; Pen: A Cross (and 1 mark)		Try: Leonard Boon, Cyril Nicholson	Referee: Tom Fielding

2 June	City	20–3	Grafton	Victoria Park 2
3:00	Try: Tom Sheehan, Robert Clark 2, Bill Davidson 2, Ernie Asher; Pen: Ernie Asher		Try: Les Bull	Referee: A Ball

2 June	Newton	28–5	Otahuhu	Victoria Park 3
3:00	Try: unknown x 1, George Iles, Bill Williams 2, Phil Castles, Len Farrant; Con: Charles Potier 3, Phil Castles; Pen: Phil Castles		Try: King; Pen: Gus Martin	Referee: A Vause

==== Round 4 ====
9 June	Newton	15–13	City	Victoria Park 1
3:00	Try: Arthur Iles, Adelbert Tobin 2 Con: Charles Potier; Pen: Charles Potier		Try: Hastedt, Robert Clark 2 Con: Ernie Asher 2	Attendance: 4,000; Referee: Stan Weston

9 June	Ponsonby	37–3	Grafton	Victoria Park 2
3:00	Try: W Henderson 2, Spence Jones 2, Arthur Rae 2, A Cross, Jim Clark, L Martin; Con: Arthur Rae, A Cross 2, J Winter; Pen: A Cross		Try: unknown x 1	Attendance: 4,000; Referee: Frank Tyson

9 June	North Shore	WBD-LBD	Otahuhu	Devonport Domain
2:00				Referee: Frank Thompson

==== Round 5 ====
Otahuhu had withdrawn from the competition meaning only two games per round from this point onwards. A letter was written to the newspapers explaining their situation that some players had requested transfers while others had been injured and the junior teams were too young or low in ability to replace the senior defections to put out a full team each week. They had also lost many club members to military service. The match at Victoria Park drew 5,000 spectators but was considered a "poor exhibition" with the field in a heavy state due to wet weather, with rain again coming down late in the match. Arthur Rae scored twice for Ponsonby and it was A. Cross's goal kicking which separated the sides as City matched Ponsonby's three tries. Bill Davidson only converting one of theirs. At Devonport Domain the visiting Newton side proved too strong scoring 4 tries to 3 with internationals George Iles, Bill Cloke, and Bill Williams all crossing the line and Charles Potier kicking 4 goals. Ernie Asher started the match at fullback but was replaced by George Paki who was celebrating his 24th birthday and it was said that City had uncovered a "tip top full" in Paki as he "never made a mistake in the game".

16 June	Ponsonby	15–11	City	Victoria Park 1
3:00	Try: Spencer Jones, Arthur Rae 2 Con: A Cross; Pen: A Cross 2		Try: John Sutton, Robert Clark, Bill Davidson; Con: Bill Davidson	Attendance: 5,000; Referee: Billy Murray

16 June	North Shore	13–20	Newton	Devonport Domain 1
3:00	Try: Cyril Nicholson, Frederick Neighbour, Ernie Bailey; Con: William Matthews; Pen: William Matthews		Try: George Iles, Phil Castles, Bill Cloke, Bill Williams; Con: Charles Potier 2 Pen: Charles Potier 2	Attendance: "Fair Attendance"; Referee: Archie Ferguson

==== Round 6 ====
The matches played at Victoria Park were the 100th and 101st senior club games played at that venue stretching from 1909 to 1917. Though both kicked off at the same time so the honour of being the 100th is shared. The Ponsonby team took the field wearing armbands after a club mate, Herbert Arthur Brewer, had been killed in action on June 7 in Belgium at the age of 25. During the week eight of the Otahuhu senior side were granted transfers due to them folding. Alf Eustace moved to City along with hooker Montrose (Monty) Stanaway, brother of Alex and Jack who had both represented New Zealand and New Zealand Māori respectively, while Bill Cloke and Gus Martin went to Newton.

30 June	Ponsonby	10–7	Newton	Victoria Park 1
3:00	Try: Spencer Jones, Jim Clark; Con: A Cross 2		Try: Lang; Con: Charles Potier; Pen: Charles Potier	Referee: Stan Weston

30 June	North Shore	11–8	Grafton	Victoria Park 2
3:00	Try: William Matthews, Stan Walters, Kirk; Pen: Stan Walters		Try: Marks, Marshbank; Pen: L Martin	Referee: T Hill

==== Round 7 ====
Grafton continued to struggle to put out a competitive team and played 3 men short against Newton. The unknown try scorer for City came about when most of the forwards piled over the line together with the press unable to see who scored. And evidently not bothering to ask the players who scored after the match.

7 July	North Shore	15–11	City	Victoria Park 1
3:00	Try: Cyril Nicholson, George Seagar, Jim Griffen; Con: Cyril Nicholson 3		Try: Bill Davidson, unknown x 1, F Sheehan; Con: Ernie Asher	Attendance: 2,500; Referee: Frank Thompson

7 July	Newton	19–3	Grafton	Victoria Park 2
3:00	Try: George Iles 3, James, Robert Clark; Con: George Iles 2		Try: Phil Castles	Attendance: 2,500; Referee: W. Aughton

==== Round 8 ====
The unknown try for Ponsonby in their win over North Shore was described in the New Zealand Herald match report as “a fierce combined rally resulted in the pack taking the ball over for a try”. Grafton defaulted their match with City and this ended their season as they were unable to field a side for any further competitive matches.

14 July	Ponsonby	7–6	North Shore	Victoria Park 1
3:00	Try: Unknown x 1 Con: Bill Walsh; Pen: Bill Walsh		Try: Stan Walters, George Seagar	Attendance: 3,500; Referee: Billy Murray

14 July	City	WBD-LBD	Grafton	Victoria Park 2
3:00				Referee: J. Clow

==== Round 9 ====
21 July	City	18–5	Newton	Victoria Park 1
3:00	Try: Ernie Asher, Bill Davidson, Hogan 2 Con: Ernie Asher 2, Bill Davidson		Try: Browne; Pen: Charles Potier	Referee: Tom Fielding

==== Round 10 ====
North Shore had three players go into military camp and substituted them with three players "from the Māori camp" including a player named Mangakapia and another named Ngatui. It was said that on the whole they were "fairly good but were handicapped a lot by a lack of knowledge of the game". In the match between City and Ponsonby, Jim Clark who had been warned earlier was sent off for disputing an obstruction call against him by referee Archie Ferguson. Future New Zealand hooker Sam Lowrie was said to have done well in the scrums getting possession for his side on 9 times out of 12. George Paki was also singled out for playing another outstanding game at fullback for City and was said to be the best fullback in Auckland. Bill Davidson at centre three quarter for City was said to have been the best back on the ground.

28 July	City	5–0	Ponsonby	Victoria Park 1
3:00	Try: C Mitchell; Con: Bill Davidson			Attendance: 6,000; Referee: Archie Ferguson

28 July	Newton	8–3	North Shore	Victoria Park 1
1:45	Try: Albert Ivil, George Iles; Con: George Iles		Try: Leonard Boon	Attendance: 6,000; Referee: A. Ball

On 21 July Ponsonby played a match versus the Waterside Workers after both Otahuhu and Grafton had left the competition. Ponsonby won the match by 14 points to 3. Ponsonby had been scheduled to play Grafton but after it became apparent that the later side could not field a team the alternative fixture was arranged.

=== Roope Rooster knockout competition ===
After both Otahuhu and Grafton Athletic had dropped out of the senior grade there were only 4 senior teams left. However the Waterside Workers formed a team and played a match versus Ponsonby during the season, and they also played in the first round of the Roope Rooster.

Following the conclusion of the Roope Rooster competition on 25 August a benefit match was played between City Rovers and Newton Rangers at Victoria Park. It was won by City 31 points to 11. On 1 September City defeated Ponsonby in another exhibition match, described as “one of the fastest and most exciting matches this season” by 13 points to 12 at Victoria Park.

==== Round 1 ====
North Shore struggled to field a team due to recent enlistments and had to use a 4th grade player and 2 other juniors to get 13 players on the field. The newspapers all described the two games as poor exhibitions. The newly put together Waterside Workers side struggled for combination and the City side was said to have treated the game as a "joke", leading 13-0 at half time and not trying seriously.

4 August	Newton	24–6	North Shore	Victoria Park 1
3:00	Try: George Iles 2, Adelbert Tobin, Bill Williams, Bill Cloke, A Thomas; Con: Charles Potier; Pen: Charles Potier; Drop: Charles Potier		Try: Cyril Nicholson, Frederick Neighbour	Attendance: 5,000; Referee: Stan Weston

4 August	City	13–7	Waterside Workers	Victoria Park 2
3:00	Try: Alf Eustace, McAubrey, Bill Davison; Con: Ernie Asher 2		Try: Tierney; Con: Len Farrant; Pen: Curtis	Attendance: 5,000; Referee: A. Vause

==== Semi final ====
11 August	Ponsonby	15–6	Newton	Victoria Park 1
3:00	Try: Arthur Rae, Bill Walsh, Sam Lowrie; Con: Bill Walsh, A Cross; Pen: A Cross		Pen: Charles Potier 2 (+ 1 mark)	Referee: Tom Fielding

==== Final ====
The final was played in greasy conditions with rain setting in around halftime with City leading 4-0 at the interval. They extended their lead after another goal by Ernie Asher to six points before Ponsonby rallied to score a converted try to Thomas McClymont followed by two penalties to Cross and a further try to Matthew Maddison, who was on debut after recently arriving from Thames. Ponsonby thus had won the championship and the Roope Rooster trophy 12-6.

18 August	Ponsonby	12–6	City	Victoria Park
3:00	Try: Thomas McClymont, Matthew Maddison; Con: A Cross; Pen: A Cross 2		Pen: Ernie Asher 3	Attendance: 5,000; Referee: Billy Murray

=== Top try scorers and point scorers ===
The following point scoring lists include both Senior Championship matches and the Roope Rooster competition.

Rank	Player	Team	Tries
1	George Iles	Newton Rangers	12
2	Bill Davidson	City Rovers	7
3	Spence Jones	Ponsonby United	6
3	Bill Williams	Newton Rangers	6
5	Robert Clark	City Rovers	5
5	Cyril Nicholson	North Shore	5
7	Stan Walters	North Shore	4
7	Leonard Boon	North Shore	4
7	Len Farrant	Newton Rangers	4
7	Arthur Rae	Ponsonby United	4

Rank	Player	Team	Tries	Con	Pen	Mark	DG	Points
1	A Cross	Ponsonby United	2	12	8	1	0	48
2	Charles Potier	Newton Rangers	1	12	8	1	1	47
3	George Iles	Newton Rangers	12	3	0	0	0	42
4	Ernie Asher	City Rovers	2	10	4	0	0	34
5	Bill Davidson	City Rovers	7	4	0	0	0	29
6	Cyril Nicholson	North Shore	5	3	0	0	0	21
7	Spence Jones	North Shore	6	0	0	0	0	18
7	Bill Williams	Newton Rangers	6	0	0	0	0	18
9	Robert Clark	City Rovers	5	0	0	0	0	15
10	Stan Walters	North Shore	4	0	1	0	0	14
10	Len Farrant	Newton Rangers	4	1	0	0	0	14
10	Arthur Rae	Ponsonby United	4	1	0	0	0	14

== Senior exhibition and charity matches ==
=== Friendly match ===
On July 21 Ponsonby was scheduled to play a championship match with Grafton but the Grafton side was not able to raise a side. Ponsonby instead played a game against a Waterside Workers team that played one man short. The match was played at Victoria Park on the number 2 field. Hemming, who was a Grafton senior player scored the lone try for the Waterside Workers team in their 14-3 loss.

21 July	Ponsonby	14-3	Waterside Workers	Victoria Park 2
3:00	Try: Spencer Jones 2, Arthur Rae, D McCarthy; Con: A Cross		Try: Hemming

=== Retired Players Fund Benefit Match ===
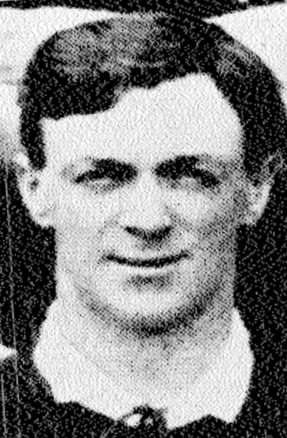
Maurice Wetherill

A match was arranged between City and Newton to raise money for retired players. George Davidson (wing) debuted for City along with 17 year old Maurice Wetherill (first five-eighth), Niccol (fullback), and S Horne (forward) who were all junior players and were asked to play for the senior side which was short immediately after they had played a match against Richmond. George Davidson would go on to play for Auckland and also represented New Zealand as a sprinter in the Antwerp Olympics. Maurice Wetherill went off to war the following year and then after his return he played for City from 1919 to 1930, playing 130 matches for them. He also played 39 games for Auckland and 20 for New Zealand. Later he moved into coaching, taking charge of City in 1930, and the Northland representative side in 1929, before becoming a referee in the 1930s, going on to referee at international level.

25 August	City	31-11	Newton	Victoria Park 1
3:00	Try: Bill Davidson 2, Bob Clarke 2, Maurice Wetherill, Hogan, Jim Rukutai; Con: Bill Davidson 3, Maurice Wetherill, Jim Rukutai		Try: George Iles, Len Farrant, Bill Cloke; Con: Charles Potier	Attendance: 4,000

=== Challenge match ===
The City club challenged Ponsonby to a match which the later side accepted.

1 September	City	13-12	Ponsonby	Victoria Park
3:00	Try: Maurice Wetherill, Bill Davidson, Bob Clarke; Con: Bill Davidson; Pen: Bill Davidson		Try: Spencer Jones, Arthur Pooley; Con: A Cross 2 Pen: A Cross (mark)	Attendance: 4,500; Referee: Archie Ferguson

=== Mackrell Memorial ===
On 8 September a combined match was played between Ponsonby-Shore and Newton-City with the proceeds devoted to a memorial to the late William Mackrell who had died on July 15 as a result of a paralytic seizure aged 35. He had played for Newton from 1909 to 1912 and played 7 games for Auckland and 17 for New Zealand. The match raised £25 for the fund which were contributions from spectators as no gate charge could be held due to the lack of fencing around Victoria Park. The combined City and Newton side was a premonition of the future with City and Newton merging in the late 1940s to become "City Newton", and later adopting the "City Newton Dragons" name.

8 September	Ponsonby-North Shore	22–3	City-Newton	Victoria Park 1
3:00	Try: Bill Walsh 2, Thomas McClymont 2, Cyril Nicholson, G Stewart; Con: A Cross 2		Try: Bill Davidson	Attendance: 4,000; Referee: Billy Murray

=== Gala match in the Auckland Domain ===
On 15 September a gala day was held with Rugby League and Football (“Association”) played to raise money for the RSA. It was declared a success and 200 pounds was raised. The match was played between Ponsonby United who had won the league championship and a combined team from the remainder of the clubs in the senior grade (City Rovers, Newton Rangers, and North Shore Albions). The combined team (wearing maroon) won by 26 to 21 after the scores were tied 21-21 late in the match. Ernie Bailey, the veteran North Shore forward struggled across the line and Bill Davidson the young City star converted the try to give the combined team the win. Charles Webb the veteran halfback made his first appearance for Ponsonby in the season and played well. The day also featured a sprint race between 6 players from the senior teams. It was won by Cyril Nicholson, the winger for North Shore Albions with Keenan placing second. A 'house match' was also played between Hobson Hotel and Thompson and Hill's which Hobson Hotel won by 23 points to 3. The City 4th Grade team played an Ellerslie Jockeys side and won 16-0.

15 September	Combined Team	26–21	Ponsonby	Auckland Domain
3:00	Try: A Thomas 2, Cyril Nicholson, Phil Castles, George Seagar, Ernie Bailey; Con: Bill Davidson 4	.	Try: D McCarthy 2, Sam Lowrie, Arthur Rae; Con: A Cross 3	Attendance: 5,000; Referee: Archie Ferguson

City and Ponsonby United played an exhibition match on 24 September at Victoria Park. The City club applied for permission to reinstate Maurice Wetherill as he had been suspended for the remainder of the season after misconduct in a recent 4th grade side. The league granted permission and he played in the five eight position and played well.

=== Returned Soldiers Benefit Match ===
Both teams had played each other four times during the season with two matches each. This match was meant to "decide the rubber" and saw City winning 16-6. The match was played to support Charles Dunning, Jack Arneil, J Neal, and Owen Gallot who had returned from the war and had been significantly incapacitated by injuries suffered while fighting in France. But also more broadly all returned soldiers. They made £200 which was given to the RSA which was gratefully received. In the first half A. Cross, the Ponsonby five eighth had to leave the field after colliding with his team mate Arthur Cadman and gashing his eye and breaking his nose.

22 September	City	16–6	Ponsonby	Victoria Park 1
3:00	Try: Bill Davidson, Harry Francis 2, Hogan; Con: Bill Davidson		Try: Arthur Rae 2	Attendance: 4,000; Referee: William Wynyard

=== Railway v Ponsonby ===
On 29 September a very controversial cross code match was played between Railway (a combination of Marist Brothers Old Boys and City) who were the winners of the Auckland Rugby Union competition, and Ponsonby, the Auckland Rugby League club champions. The match was not sanctioned by the Auckland Rugby Union as Railway was also scheduled to play an annual charity rugby union match versus University on the same day. The Railway team playing the league code had “gone over to the Northern Union game”. They played a further match against City Rovers which they lost by 18 points to 6 before moving to the Auckland Rugby League full-time in 1918. They would eventually amalgamate with Grafton Athletic and in 1919 they would reform as the Marist Rugby League Old Boys club”. The Railway team included Ces Dacre who went on to play cricket and soccer for New Zealand. Jimmy (Sonny) Hing who switched to Marist and had a long involvement in rugby league including with the Point Chevalier club also played in the matches. During the game Spencer Jones, playing on the wing for Ponsonby after several years in their backline, broke his leg after Corner, playing fullback for Railway kicked at the ball on the ground and made heavy contact with Jones' shin. He was taken to hospital by ambulance with the bone being set.

29 September	Railway	12–3	Ponsonby	Victoria Park 1
3:00	Try: Ces Dacre, Simpson, James (Sonny) Hing, P Courtney		Try: W Henderson	Attendance: 2,000; Referee: Billy Murray

=== City v Railway ===
6 October	City	18–6	Railway	Victoria Park 1
3:00	Try: I Hogan, Montrose Stanaway, Bill Davidson, Jim Rukutai, Alf Eustace, C Mitchell		Try: H Barclay, James (Sonny) Hing	Attendance: 3,500; Referee: A Ball

== Lower grade competitions ==
The newly formed Pupuke club entered a side in the third grade. They were based in the Takapuna area and wore red uniforms. Manukau, Remuera and Riverhead did not field teams in any grades in 1917. It was decided at the start of the season that no trophies would be awarded in any of the grades due to the effect of the war on the competition and in line with there being no representative football being played in the war years. On several occasions it was asked if they would reconsider awarding winning teams anything but they consistently stated that nothing would be awarded, including badges.

There were also house matches played. On August 4 Thompson and Hill defeated A. & T. Burt 7-2.

=== Second grade ===
Ponsonby won the grade. Otahuhu withdrew after 1 round following a 12-0 loss to Newton. Only 18 results were reported from 25 scheduled matches though in the 1949 Rugby League Annual it was stated that Ponsonby had won 8 from 9 matches with a for of 85 and against of 18. The June 23 matches were rained out so it is possible that they won 8 from 8 as they only had 8 scheduled matches in the newspaper draws.

Team	Pld	W	D	L	B	F	A	Pts
Ponsonby United	8	8	0	0	0	85	18	16
Thames Old Boys	8	2	0	3	0	24	22	4
Newton Rangers	7	1	0	3	0	17	29	2
City Rovers	8	0	0	4	1	5	45	0
Otahuhu Rovers	1	0	0	1	0	0	12	0

=== Third grade ===
Newton withdrew from the competition after 1 round, while Ponsonby withdrew after 3 rounds. City Rovers beat Northcote & Birkenhead Ramblers in round 11, 5-3 to seal the championship. Of the 21 matches played only 12 scores were reported.

Team	Pld	W	D	L	B	F	A	Pts
City Rovers	9	7	0	0	1	96	16	14
North Shore Albions	9	3	0	2	0	67	36	6
Pupuke	10	1	0	4	0	15	51	2
Newton Rangers	1	1	0	0	0	21	0	2
Northcote & Birkenhead Ramblers	11	0	0	5	0	8	83	0
Ponsonby United	2	0	0	1	1	0	21	0

=== Fourth grade ===
City won the fourth grade competition after going undefeated. Otahuhu (the runner up did manage a 3-3 draw with them however. City won the majority of their matches without conceding any points (19-0, 26-0, 42-0, 68-0, 35-0, 3-3, 13-5, 33-0, 10-0, 25-0, 8-0, and 33-0). Thames Old Boys were awarded their round one match after Sunnyside fielded an overweight player. The match had finished in a 0-0 draw. North Shore withdrew after failing to field a side in round 1 and have not been included in the standings. Ponsonby withdrew after defaulting in round 10. There were only 26 scores reported, with 26 scores not reported.

Team	Pld	W	D	L	B	F	A	Pts
City Rovers	14	13	1	0	0	315	8	27
Richmond Rovers	14	4	0	3	0	25	45	8
Otahuhu Rovers	13	3	1	1	2	78	13	7
Grafton Athletic	13	3	1	3	0	38	47	7
Thames Old Boys	12	2	0	3	1	0	69	4
Ponsonby United	10	1	0	5	0	9	75	2
Sunnyside	13	0	0	6	0	15	125	0
Newton Rangers	14	0	0	5	0	2	100	0

=== Fifth grade ===
North Shore Albions won the championship. Only 12 match results were reported with 21 results not reported. Otahuhu only had 4 of their results reported but were said to have finished runner up, not 3rd.

Team	Pld	W	D	L	B	F	A	Pts
North Shore Albions	6	5	1	0	0	61	8	11
City Rovers B	4	3	0	1	0	57	9	6
Otahuhu Rovers	4	2	1	1	0	44	21	5
Telegraph Messengers	3	1	0	2	0	21	24	2
City Rovers A	4	0	0	4	0	6	56	0
Northcote & Birkenhead Ramblers	3	0	0	3	0	4	75	0

=== Sixth grade ===
North Shore won the championship. There were 16 results reported and 5 were not reported.

Team	Pld	W	D	L	B	F	A	Pts
North Shore Albions	9	7	0	2	0	89	35	14
Richmond Rovers	7	4	0	3	0	35	36	8
City Rovers	8	4	0	4	0	39	46	8
Telegraph Messengers	8	1	0	7	0	26	72	2

== Representative fixture ==
Auckland played a match against a Military Representative side representing the Trentham, Featherston, and Tauherenikau camps at the Auckland Domain on 13 October. A large crowd attended and the total proceeds of the game were devoted to the Red Cross. Maurice Wetherill debuted for Auckland when he came on for Bill Davidson who was injured. Wetherill would join the war effort and then return to City, going on to play 20 matches for New Zealand and 39 for Auckland before his retirement from playing in 1930. He later became a first grade and representative referee who controlled test matches.

=== Auckland v Military Representatives ===
13 October	Auckland	23–20	Military Camps	Auckland Domain
3:00	Try: Bill Davidson 2, Thomas McClymont, A Thomas, C Mitchell, Sam Lowrie, Maurice Wetherill; Con: A Cross		Try: Clark 2, Guiney, Hickey; Con: Clark 2, McPhee; Pen: Clark	Attendance: 1,500; Referee: Leonard Nield

=== Auckland matches played and scorers ===
No	Name	Club Team	Play	Tries	Con	Pen	Points
1	Bill Davidson	City	1	2	0	0	6
2	Thomas McClymont	Ponsonby	1	1	0	0	3
2	A Thomas	Newton	1	1	0	0	3
2	C 'Chook' Mitchell	City	1	1	0	0	3
2	Sam Lowrie	Ponsonby	1	1	0	0	3
2	Maurice Wetherill	City	1	1	0	0	3
7	A Cross	Ponsonby	1	0	1	0	2
8	Ivan Stewart	North Shore	1	0	0	0	0
8	J Hogan	City	1	0	0	0	0
8	Jim Rukutai	City	1	0	0	0	0
8	Jim Clark	City	1	0	0	0	0
8	Albert Ivil	Newton	1	0	0	0	0
8	George Seagar	North Shore	1	0	0	0	0
8	George Paki	City	1	0	0	0	0
8	Maurice Wetherill	City	1	0	0	0	0
