= Pupuke Rugby League Club =

Defunct NZ rugby league club, based in Auckland

Pupuke
Club information
- Full name: Pupuke Rugby League Club
- Colours: Red
- Founded: 1917
- Exited: 1917; 109 years ago

Former details
- Ground: Takapuna
- Competition: Auckland Rugby League

The Pupuke Rugby League Club were a rugby league club which existed briefly in 1917 and competed in the Auckland Rugby League competitions. They were based in Takapuna on Auckland's North Shore in New Zealand.

== 1917 season ==
On 17 May 1917 the Pupuke rugby league club was granted affiliation with the Auckland Rugby League at their weekly management meeting. They entered a single team in the 3rd grade competition. The Observer newspaper reported that “Takapuna is the latest recruit to Northern Unionism. Forty-three lads there have formed a club to be known as the Pupuke Club. One team has been entered in the third grade competitions to play in all red jerseys”.

Their first match was against Newton Rangers at 3pm on 19 May at Takapuna with the referee Mr. F. Tyson. There was no result reported in the newspapers for the match. During the following week it was reported that W.E. Thorpe had transferred to the club from Newton. They then played City Rovers on 26 May and lost 5–12. The Auckland Star reported that McGirr scored their try and Thorpe converted it.

They then lost to North Shore Albions on 2 June by 6 points to 0 before registering their first win, over North Shore rivals Northcote & Birkenhead Ramblers by 5 points to 0. During the week their team list was published in the Auckland Star newspaper and was as follows: Adams, Quedley, Creamer, De Piua, Warinan (captain), Stewart, Henderson, Thorpe, Dunn, Brown, Gibbons, Sheriff, Holmes, Patrick, Brunton, and Moseley. They were scheduled to play North Shore again on 23 June but there were no matches played due to poor weather. Their 5th match was eventually played, against North Shore after being rescheduled for 30 June. They lost by 11 points to 5.

There were very few results reported over the remainder of the season. They played matches against Northcote on 7 July, City on 14 July, North Shore on 21 July, and City once again on 28 July with a 28–0 loss. Their last competition match of the season and ultimately ever, was against Northcote on 11 August. As this was beyond the end of the championship matches it is possible that this was a rescheduled match from earlier in the season. Then on 23 August the Pupuke club wrote a request to the Auckland Rugby League to play a fancy costume match “in aid of the Navy League” and permission was granted provided the match was under the supervision of officials from the league. The events of the match were not reported.

At the start of the 1918 season it was reported in the Auckland Star that the club was scheduled to have their team weighed in on Thursday 18 April. However they ultimately never entered a team in any grade and they thereafter ceased to exist. In 1921 later a Takapuna Rugby League club was entered into the competition and competed until 1925 though this was a new team with no obvious links to the Pupuke team from the same area.

== Pupuke Team Record (1917) ==
The season record for the most senior men's team in the club.

Season	Grade	Name	Played	W	D	L	PF	PA	PD	Pts	Position (Teams)
1917	3rd Grade	Pupuke	10	1	0	4	15	51	-36	2	Approximately 3rd of 6, 5 scores not reported.
