= Tim Peckham =

New Zealand international rugby league player

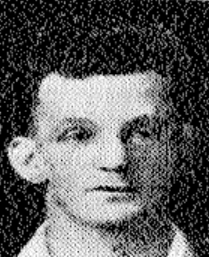

Personal information
- Full name: William Frederick Peckham
- Born: 8 December 1900 Huntly, Waikato, New Zealand
- Died: 27 June 1957 (aged 56) Auckland, New Zealand

Playing information
- Weight: 10 st 2 lb (64 kg)
- Position: Halfback
Club
| Years | Team | Pld | T | G | FG | P |
|---|---|---|---|---|---|---|
| 1920 | Huntly | 1 | 0 | 0 | 0 | 0 |
| 1921 | City Rovers | 14 | 5 | 0 | 0 | 15 |
| 1922 | Huntly | 5 | 2 | 0 | 0 | 3 |
| 1923–24 | Athletic (Hamilton) | 15 | 10 | 3 | 0 | 36 |
| 1925–28 | Ponsonby United | 59 | 16 | 27 | 0 | 102 |
| 1929–30 | Richmond Rovers | 13 | 2 | 0 | 0 | 6 |
| 1931 | Waterside Workers | 2 | 0 | 0 | 0 | 6 |
| 1932 | City Rovers | 9 | 0 | 3 | 0 | 6 |
| | Total | 118 | 35 | 33 | 0 | 174 |
Representative
| Years | Team | Pld | T | G | FG | P |
| 1920 | Lower Waikato | 1 | 0 | 0 | 0 | 0 |
| 1921–28 | Auckland | 14 | 5 | 4 | 0 | 24 |
| 1922 | Lower Waikato | 2 | 1 | 3 | 0 | 9 |
| 1922–24 | South Auckland (Waikato) | 10 | 2 | 8 | 0 | 22 |
| 1922–28 | Auckland Province | 3 | 0 | 0 | 0 | 0 |
| 1923–24 | Hamilton | 10 | 2 | 3 | 0 | 12 |
| 1926–27 | North Island | 2 | 0 | 0 | 0 | 0 |
| 1928 | New Zealand | 2 | 0 | 0 | 0 | 0 |

William Frederick Peckham (1900–1957), better known as Tim Peckham was a New Zealand international rugby league player. He played 2 tests for New Zealand in 1928 becoming the 198th Kiwi in the process. He also played representative rugby league in the 1920s for Auckland, the sub unions of Lower Waikato, Hamilton, and South Auckland, and in 1926 and 1927 for the North Island. He played club rugby league for City Rovers, Huntly United, Athletic (Hamilton) Ponsonby United, and Richmond Rovers.

== Early life ==
Tim Peckham was born on 8 December 1900 to Fanny Clara Peckham (née Smith), and Henry William Peckham who had married in 1888. He had 10 siblings; Kate (b.1888), Harry (b.1889), Bert (b.1896), Joseph (b.1899), John Ashby (b.1903), Ivy May (b.1905), Lillian Mary (b.1906), Kenneth (b.1907), Edith Myrtle (b.1909), and Marjory (b.1911). His father Henry was killed in the Ralph Mine disaster in Huntly on the morning of 12 September 1914 which claimed the lives of 43 miners. Henry was aged 45 at the time of his death with Tim aged 13.

== Playing career ==
=== City Rovers and Auckland debut’s ===
Tim Peckham was a diminutive halfback who began his playing career for Huntly in 1920. He was chosen in the Lower Waikato side to play the visiting Maritime club from Auckland on July 3. At the start of the 1921 season he had moved to Auckland and joined the City Rovers rugby league club in the junior grades, starting with their 5th grade side. He debuted for the senior team in 1921 and went on to play 14 matches, scoring 4 tries. That season City won the Monteith Shield for winning the 1st grade championship. They also won the Roope Rooster knockout competition when they defeated Maritime 30–14 and took the Thacker Shield off Ponsonby United with a 25–10 win. Peckham had impressed the representative selectors enough to be chosen for the Auckland team for their Southern Tour. He debuted against Wellington on 20 August. He scored a try in a 23–21 win at the Basin Reserve, in Wellington. He played again against the West Coast on 24 August at Greymouth in a 47–7 victory before playing 3 days later against Canterbury at Sydenham Park in Christchurch. Auckland won 39 to 14 with Peckham kicking a conversion.

=== Move to Waikato, Huntly, Athletic, and representative football ===
In early 1922 Peckham moved to live in the Waikato region and joined the Huntly rugby league club where he debuted for them in a 6 May match against Ngaruawahia. His father had been killed in a mining accident in Huntly 8 years earlier. Huntly won the match 51 to 8. He was selected for the Lower Waikato representative team for a 27 May match with King Country which was for the Endean Shield. Lower Waikato won 24 to 4 with Peckham kicking a penalty goal. Peckham was then chosen in the full Waikato side to play the touring Australian University side at Ngaruawahia. The Australian team was made up of players from Sydney University and Brisbane Universities but rested some of its first choice players after two wins over Auckland. They were thrashed by the local team 25–0 with Peckham scoring twice, the first after “fast following up” and the second when he received a pass then “dummied and put in a fine swerving run, beating several men and diving across the line”. Two weeks later he played another Endean Shield match for Lower Waikato against King Country before a crowd of 1,000 in Huntly. Lower Waikato won 28 to 0 with Peckham scored the first try or the game and kicked 2 conversions. Huntly had won the Lower Waikato competition and on 19 August they played a match with United from the Hamilton competition for the right to play the Auckland champions (his old City Rovers side). He scored a try for Huntly in a 25–6 win over United. Their match with City was played on 21 October at Carlaw Park and saw the City side win easily by 42–14 though Peckham did cross for a try after running in support of Sullivan who had broken through.

Peckham two months earlier, on 26 August had played for the South Auckland representative team against Hawke's Bay at Steele Park in Hamilton. South Auckland won the match 17 to 15 after trailing 8–10 at halftime. He was unable to play for the South Auckland team against the touring New South Wales team as he had injured his arm. On 2 September he was included in the South Auckland team to challenge Auckland for the Northern Union Challenge Cup at Carlaw Park. In an upset South Auckland won 21–20 with Peckham kicking a penalty and a conversion. It was the first ever time that Auckland had lost a challenge match. On 6 September South Auckland journeyed to Palmerston North to play Wellington. They won 24 to 6 with Peckham converting one of their tries. Then on 20 September, Peckham played for the Auckland Province side which played the New South Wales team at the Auckland Domain before a crowd of 5,500.

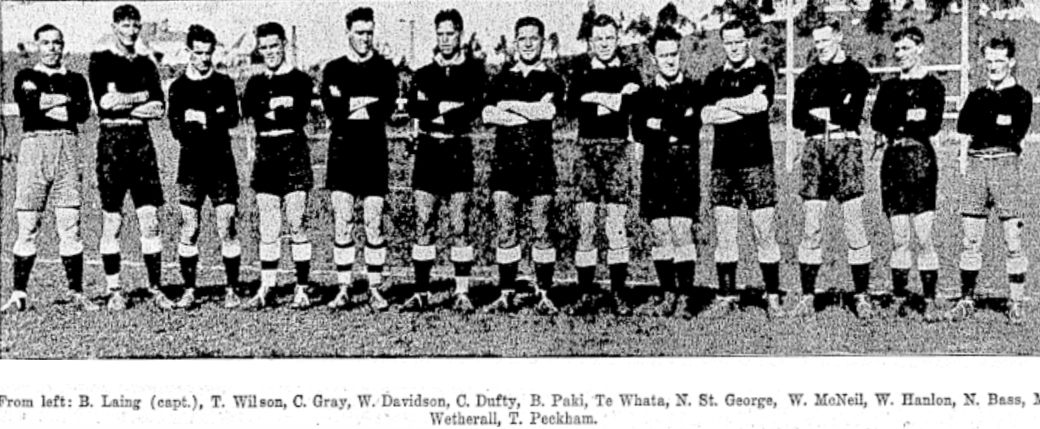
Tim Peckham in the 1922 Auckland Province side that played New South Wales at the Auckland Domain. He is on the extreme right.

A week later he played the same New South Wales side for South Auckland at Steele Park in Hamilton. The home team lost 17–12 with Peckham kicking 2 conversions for the losers. It was said that he was “the best back on the field” for South Auckland where “he wormed his way into every possible chance to get the leather”. His final representative match of the 1922 season came when South Auckland travelled to Waihi to take on the local team at the Waihi Recreation Ground. South Auckland won the match by 20 to 9 in heavy rain before 400 spectators.

The 1923 season saw Peckham move to Hamilton and join the Athletic rugby league club. His debut for them saw him score 2 tries and kick a conversion in a 44 to 8 win over the City side based in Hamilton. He played 10 matches for them during the season scoring 9 tries and kicking 3 goals. Controversially he appeared to turn out for the Marist rugby side in early May with the newspaper reporting “Peckham, or league fame, played half, and showed cleverness. However, he seemed to get confused with the rules, but after a game or two will be all right, and will strengthen the team”. It was also reported that “a persistent rumour is being circulated that Tim Peckham, Athletics’ half-back, and South Auckland rep., is applying for reinstatement to rugby”. However the reporter had said that Peckham denied this when they asked him directly. He then played several rugby league matches for Athletic over the coming weeks to confirm this. His first representative match was for the Hamilton sub union side who played against the Marist Old Boys club team from Auckland. Hamilton won 28 to 13 at Hinemoa Park in Hamilton with Peckham kicking a conversion. He then captained the Hamilton side against the Lower Waikato team on 7 July at Ngaruawahia in something of a historic encounter. Hamilton defeated Lower Waikato to lift the Endean Shield off the home side for the first time in the shields history which had been held by Lower Waikato since it was inaugurated in 1911. Peckham scored a try between the posts to give Hamilton a 16–11 lead and they went on to win 24–22. They defended the shield 2 weeks later against Taumarunui 43 to 7 at Hinemoa Park. On 4 August Hamilton hosted Lower Waikato at Seddon Park as part of a charity event to raise money for the Waikato Hospital Patients’ Sunshine League. Lower Waikato won the match 11–0 to win the Sunshine Challenge Cup. His final match of the season for Hamilton was against Lower Waikato once more, on 1 September.

Peckham was then selected for the South Auckland side to play Wellington at Steele Park in Hamilton on 18 August. The home side won 27 to 11 to retain the Northern Union Challenge Cup before a “record crowd”. It was said after the match that Peckham “should have been on the side-line. He was not fit, and a rest would have done him no harm. In the first spell he played well, even if not with his customary dash. In the second half his leg “went” on him, and thereafter he was a “lame duck”. Peckham is diminutive, but fit and well it is doubtful is there is a more tricky or heady half playing league in New Zealand”. Two weeks later he was fit to play again in Hamilton's defence of the Endean Shield against Lower Waikato at Steele Park. They won the match 27–20 with Peckham playing in his usual position at halfback.

He was then selected for the final two representative matches of the season, both between South Auckland and Auckland. The first was for the Northern Union Challenge Cup to be played at Steele Park in Hamilton. In a hard-fought match a 20–20 draw resulted. Then on 13 October South Auckland travelled to Auckland to play at Carlaw Park. The Cup was not on the line and Auckland won easily by 35 points to 11.

His 1924 season was marred by a bad injury midway through meaning he only played 11 games in total. Earlier in the year he had competed in several running races at the Hamilton Borough Picnic as he was an employee of the council. On 23 February he won the 100 yard Municipal Handicap, the 220 yard Municipal Handicap, and the 100 yard Municipal Running Championship in a time of 11 1-5s. On 17 April he competed at a Selwyn Club meeting at Mangatapu and he won the 100 yard Handicap in a time of 10 seconds, and finished 3rd in the 220 yard Handicap.

When the league season commenced he was still playing for the Athletic senior side. He played 5 matches for them scoring a try against City. On 27 May he played for Hamilton against Marist from Christchurch who were on a northern tour. He was captaining the Hamilton side and was said to be “their outstanding man” whoever they still went down 25–3 to the visitors at Steele Park before 700 spectators. A week later he played for black and white of Hamilton against the red, white and blue of Lower Waikato. Hamilton won 16–13 with Peckham made a “brilliant solo run, beating the opposition badly, to score between the posts”. Then with Hamilton trailing 13–12 he kicked 2 penalties late in the match to gain the win before a “record crowd” at Hinemoa Park. The Waikato Times gave this description of Peckham, "he was “just the inimitable “Tim”. His play was full of the spectacular movement enthusiasts look for. Peckham is always there when wanted, and his meteoric runs remind one of a hare dashing for an objective with foes seemingly everywhere. One try on Tuesday was a ‘corker’. A player in the five-eighth positions, alongside Peckham, will seldom be able to follow the latter, but by running right through he would find himself very often just in the right position to take Peckham's pass, with better results than by endeavouring to go with the player".

The teams had essentially been trialing for the South Auckland side to play the touring Australian Universities team. Peckham unsurprisingly made the side and kicked 2 penalties and a conversion to help his side to a 12–9 win at Steele Park before a large crowd.

Peckham then played 3 club matches though he missed 2 others for injury. On 12 July he turned out for Hamilton versus ‘the rest’ and they won 20–10. The match was preparation to play Auckland B at Carlaw Park on the following Wednesday. The Auckland B team ran out winners by 28–18. Then 3 days later Peckham played his last game for the season for Hamilton against Lower Waikato. He badly strained his ankle and had to be helped off the field in a 19–13 loss. The injury ruled him out of the match with the touring England side.

=== Return to Auckland, Ponsonby United debut and resumption of Auckland rep career ===
1925 saw Tim Peckham return to Auckland where he joined his brother Joseph at the Ponsonby United club. Joseph had been playing for Ponsonby since 1923. Tim played 17 matches for Ponsonby during the season, scoring 6 tries and kicking 3 conversions. Included in those matches was the Roope Rooster final win 10–5 over his old City Rovers side and the 35–3 Stormont Shield final win over the same opponent. In the Stormont Shield match he scored 2 tries and kicked a conversion. His try came after combining with George Gardiner while the second with interchange play with Frank Delgrosso.

His representative season began with a match for an Auckland B team against an Auckland A side as curtain raiser to the North Island – South Island match. His Auckland A team won 5–0 at Carlaw Park. It was part of a series of 3 matches on the day to select the New Zealand side. He did not make the team but was chosen to play for Auckland against the New Zealand side just 5 days later on 2 July. Auckland lost the match 16–9. Peckham was then chosen in the Auckland B side to tour the south. He played in their match with the West Coast at Greymouth on 9 September. Auckland B won 22–15 with Peckham scoring a first half try. They then suffered a 6–5 loss against Canterbury at Monica Park in Christchurch before 2,500 spectators. His final representative match for the season was for Auckland Province against Queensland on 10 October. The Auckland side was thrashed 54–14 before a crowd of 9,000 at Carlaw Park.

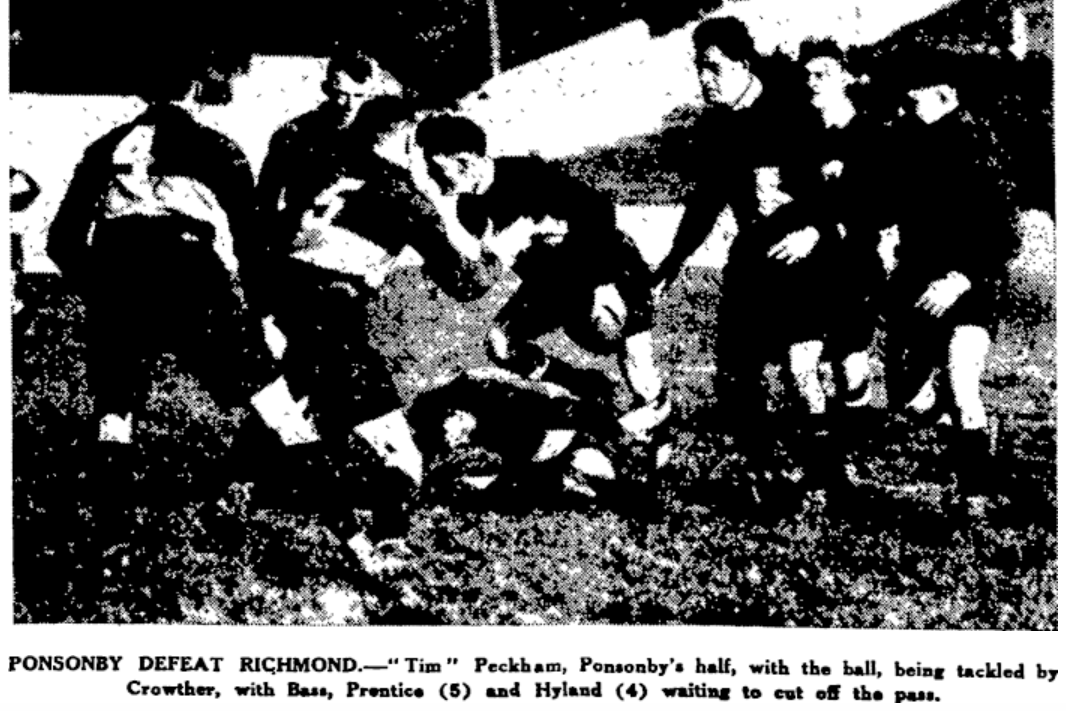

In 1926 Tim was joined at Ponsonby by another brother, Kenneth. Tim played 14 matches for them, scoring 4 tries and kicking 12 conversions. Ponsonby won the Monteith Shield after defeating City Rovers in the final 13–8 with Peckham kicking a conversion. On 22 October they defeated Richmond Rovers to win the Stormont Shield with Peckham scoring a try and kicking 3 conversions.

He played for Auckland against South Auckland on 26 June and Auckland won easily by 49 points to 15. Peckham scored a try and kicked a conversion. A week later on 3 July he made his North Island debut in their inter-island match with the South Island. The North Island won 31–22 before a large crowd of 18,000 at Carlaw Park. Several trial matches were then played to select the New Zealand touring team to England and Wales but Peckham did not play in any of them and was not selected for the tour. He did however play for Auckland against New Zealand on 7 August prior to their departure. He scored a try in a 52–32 win to Auckland, with New Zealand not taking the match seriously. He again played for Auckland against Otago on 7 August with Auckland winning 14–4 with Peckham scoring another try.

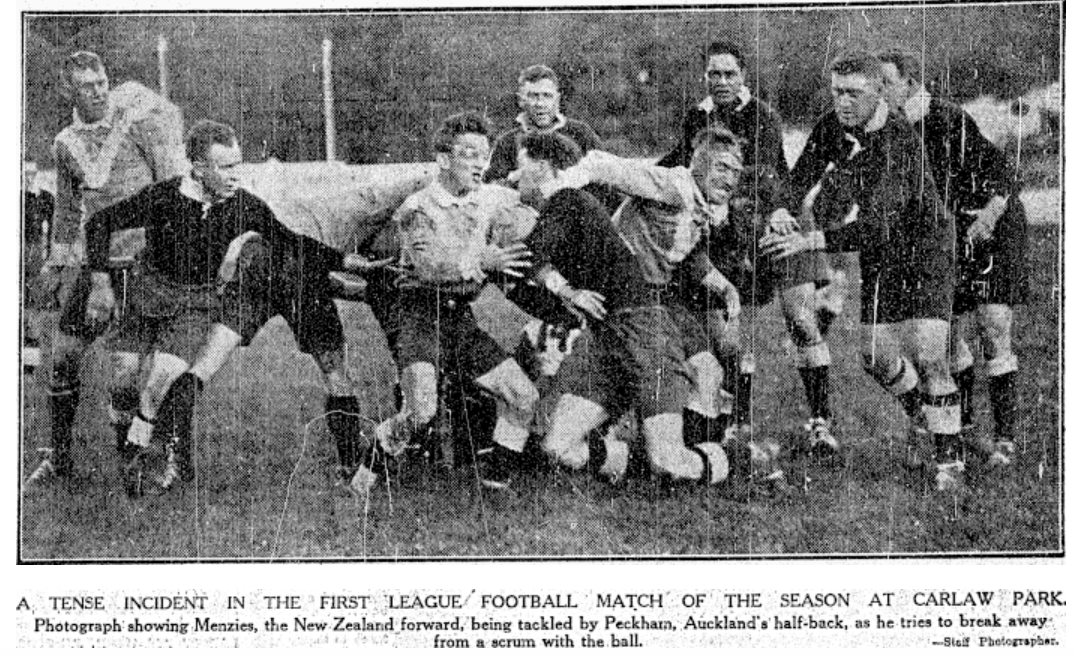

1927 saw all three Peckham brothers playing for Ponsonby. Tim played in 15 matches and scored 2 tries and kicked 3 conversions. He was on the losing side in the championship final 3–6 against Newton Rangers. He only played two representative matches during the season. The first was for Auckland against the returning Auckland members from the New Zealand team which had come home from their ill-fated tour of England and Wales. Peckham scored a try after he beat the defence and passed to Stan Prentice who returned the ball to him to score. He later kicked a conversion which tied the scores at 21–21 before Auckland won the match with a try with a few minutes to go 24–21. Then late in the season Peckham's second representative match was for the North Island against the South Island. The North Island won a close match by 13 to 8.

=== New Zealand debut ===
The 1928 season was to be an extremely busy one for Peckham. He played in 24 matches in total. He was once more playing for Ponsonby with his brothers Joseph and Kenneth, He was captaining the side and he turned out in 16 matches, scoring 2 tries and kicking 6 goals.

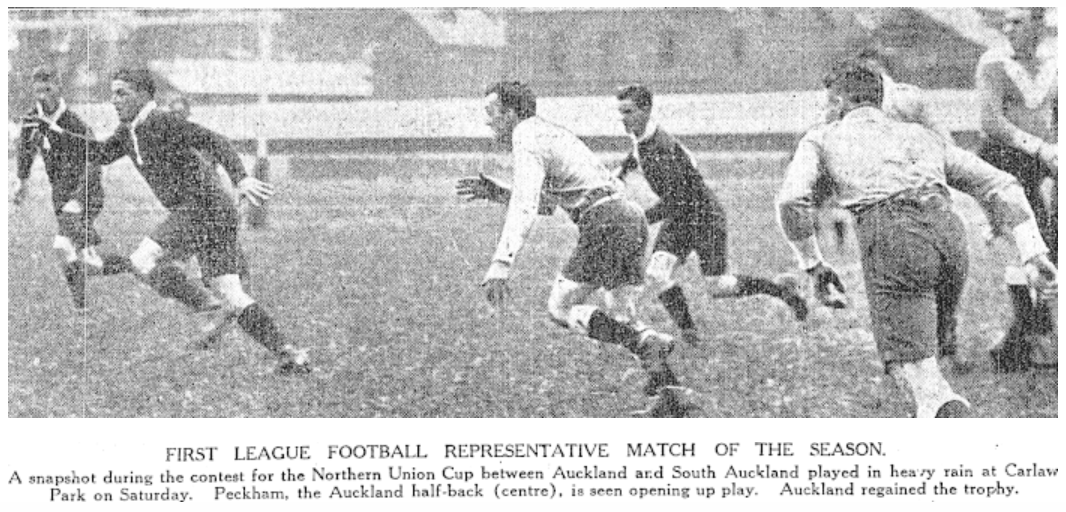

He played for Auckland on 6 June against South Auckland in a 22–3 win. Then on 11 July he played for Auckland Possibles against Auckland Probables and scored a try in a 24–14 win. Two weeks later on 25 July he kicked a conversion in a 17–19 loss to his old South Auckland side. On 1 August a New Zealand Probables v Possibles match was played with the Probables side who won 27–24.

Peckham was then selected in the New Zealand squad for the 1st test against England to be played at Carlaw Park on 4 August. He was named as a back reserve with his Ponsonby teammate Frank Delgrosso starting at halfback. He was not required to take the field in New Zealand's 17–13 win. Then on 8 August he played for the Auckland Provincial side against England. They went down 14–9 before a crowd of 15,000 at Carlaw Park. He travelled south with the New Zealand team to Dunedin where the 2nd test would be played. The match was widely regarded as an extremely dirty game at the Caledonian Ground before 10,000 spectators. Peckham had once again been an emergency reserve for the test and came on to replace Frank Delgrosso. Delgrosso and Stan Prentice had been the halves and Delgrosso was carried off on a stretcher while Prentice had to have 4 stitches for an ear wound. Peckham arrived on the field with the scores 2–2. He “made a fine opening and a good passing movement enabled Len Scott to score. In the second half he “hurdled two opponents, [and] brought the crowd to its toes, but the effort fell through”. Multiple stoppages occurred over the remainder of the match due to injuries and rough play but the English side ground out a 13–5 win to level the series 1–1. It was said afterwards that Peckham “played a very fine game”.

Peckham and Delgrosso were bracketed in the halves with one to be omitted for the 3rd test to be played at English Park in Christchurch. Peckham was then named on his own at halfback with Delgrosso being bracketed in the three quarters before he was ultimately left out of the side. Prentice was moved to the wing with Maurice Wetherill shifting into the halves to partner Peckham. Early in the test Peckham was tackled high and from the resulting penalty Craddock Dufty kicked a penalty to give New Zealand a 2–0 lead. A while later near “his own twenty-five he cut in to pass three or four opponents. He let out to Scott” who was tackled well by Sullivan. Later Sullivan cleared for England with a penalty but Peckham brought the ball right back “with a jinky run”, then Rees for England made a good run before Peckham took the ball back the other way with a spectacular movement describe as “a corkscrew run that gained forty yards” before he “lobbed a pass out to Goodall, who knocked on with a clear run in”. During the second half Peckham and Brisbane broke into the English twenty-five and Peckham “won a scrum near the line”. With the score 6–5 in the favour of England Bowman was about to score for the visitors when Peckham kicked the ball out of his hands. It was to no avail though as England went on to win by that score. After the match Peckham the Christchurch Press wrote “the play of the mercurial Peckham… was a delight to watch. Nobody has anything to teach him about spotting gaps, straight running when it is needed, and swerving and side-stepping”. The English captain Jim Sullivan said “I particularly admired T. Peckham’s great work behind our scrum. It was a fine, clean exhibition”. The Sun newspaper reported that Peckham “was the pick of the team, and seemed to be in everything”.

Aside from returning to play for Ponsonby after the 3rd test Peckham also played two matches for Auckland. The first was against Otago on 15 September with Auckland winning 42–22. He then played in an Auckland side which lost 21–7 against South Auckland in Hamilton on 13 October.

=== Transfer confusion and semi-retirement, transfers to Richmond Rovers ===
1929 saw Peckham still registered with Ponsonby but he did not play for them. On 22 May at the ARL management meeting he was granted permission to play for Kingsland Athletic provided Ponsonby agreed. The transfer was granted in early June according to the New Zealand Herald however the Auckland Star reported that the transfer was to Newton Rangers where his brother Kenneth had transferred at the start of the season. He appears not to have actually taken the field for Newton at all during the season and then in late August he was transferred from Newton to the Richmond Rovers. He came on as a replacement in their 17–12 Roope Rooster round 1 win over Devonport United and “excelled”. His second and last match of the season was in their semi final loss against Ponsonby.

In the 1929 season he played 12 games for Richmond and scored 3 tries. He was injured in early May and missed a match before being selected in the Auckland squad to play Northland but was only named in the reserves and did not play. Weeks later he was named in the Auckland squad once more for their match with South Auckland but again was only selected in the reserves and did not play. Players were seeking to impress the New Zealand selectors for the tour of Australia. Peckham finished the season playing for Richmond and made no representative appearances at all.

In 1931 he transferred back to Ponsonby however he didn't take the field for them. In August he played in matches for the Waterside Workers in the mid week company competition as he was working on the Waterside at the time. He scored a try in a win over Stonex and Stormonts. He scored another try in another match with Stonex and Stormonts on 1 September and was also picked in a representative Waterside Workers side which hope to tour the Waikato. They did travel to Hikurangi to play a match there but he was taken ill on the journey and did not take the field.

=== Transfer to City Rovers and retirement ===
He was still working on the Waterside in 1932 and competed in running events at their annual picnic at Redwood Park in Swanson where he won the one mile open race. He transferred to City Rovers and this was to be the final year of rugby league of his career ending up with the club that he made his debut at back in 1921. He made 10 appearances and kicked 3 conversions. His form was good enough to see him selected for the Auckland Probables side to play the Possibles on 16 July, and he scored a try and kicked 2 conversions in a 26–12 win. Then a week later on 23 July he played in the Probables side against the Possibles and scored a try in a 37–16 win. The New Zealand selectors had been trying to choose the side to take on the touring England team however Peckham did not make the side. He was however at the welcoming of the English team and called out to the famous English captain Jim Sullivan from the wharf to the steamer as it arrived "hullo Jim" with Sullivan replying "hullo Tim" in return. The Auckland Star reported that Peckham had become friends with many of the English players on the 1928 tour. Peckham then finished the season playing for City and his final ever match was in a Roope Rooster final loss to Marist Old Boys where he did not play well as he was nursing an injured arm. He was registered with City for the 1935 season however he did not take the field as he retired from playing. Five years later in 1940 he did play a charity match for the South Auckland veterans side against the Auckland veterans and he played in the same fixture in 1941.

== World War II ==
In 1941 Peckham enlisted in the army for World War II at the age of 41. His enlistment details stated that he was living at 19 St. Benedicts Street, Eden Terrace in Auckland and was single. He was still working on the Waterside. He was a private in the Infantry Brigade in the Second NZ Expeditionary Force. He departed from Papakura in 1941. He arrived home on 30 September 1945 on board the SS Strathmore which arrived in Wellington.

== Personal life and death ==
Tim Peckham lived in Grey Lynn, Auckland in the late 1920s and at 16 Anglesea Street in Freemans Bay, Auckland in the 1940s before moving to 86/744 Great North Road in the 1950s. He married Emma Georgina Gavey in 1945. Tim Peckham died on 27 June 1957 aged 56. His ashes were scattered at Waikumete Cemetery and Crematorium on July 1. Emma died in 1971 aged 75.
