= Ponsonby Ponies =

Rugby league club based in Ponsonby, New Zealand

Club information
- Full name: Ponsonby United Rugby League Football Club
- Colours: blue and black
- Founded: 1908; 118 years ago
- Website: http://www.ponies.kiwi/

Current details
- Ground: Victoria Park
- Competition: Auckland Rugby League
- 2018: 2nd

Records
- Premierships: 1917, 1918, 1919, 1926, 1929, 1930, 1952, 1954, 1958, 1967, 1972, 1973
- Minor premierships: 1952, 1954, 1958, 1965, 1967, 1968, 1973
- Roope Rooster: 1917, 1922, 1923, 1925, 1930, 1944, 1952, 1953, 1972, 1973, 2025
- Stormont Shield: 1925, 1926, 1952, 1967, 1972
- Sharman Cup: 1990
- Phelan Shield: 1936, 2007

The Ponsonby Ponies are a rugby league club based in Ponsonby, New Zealand. The club was founded in 1908 and was originally named Ponsonby United. The Ponies compete in the Auckland Rugby League competition and are the oldest rugby league club in NZ.

== History ==
=== 1909 to 1930 ===
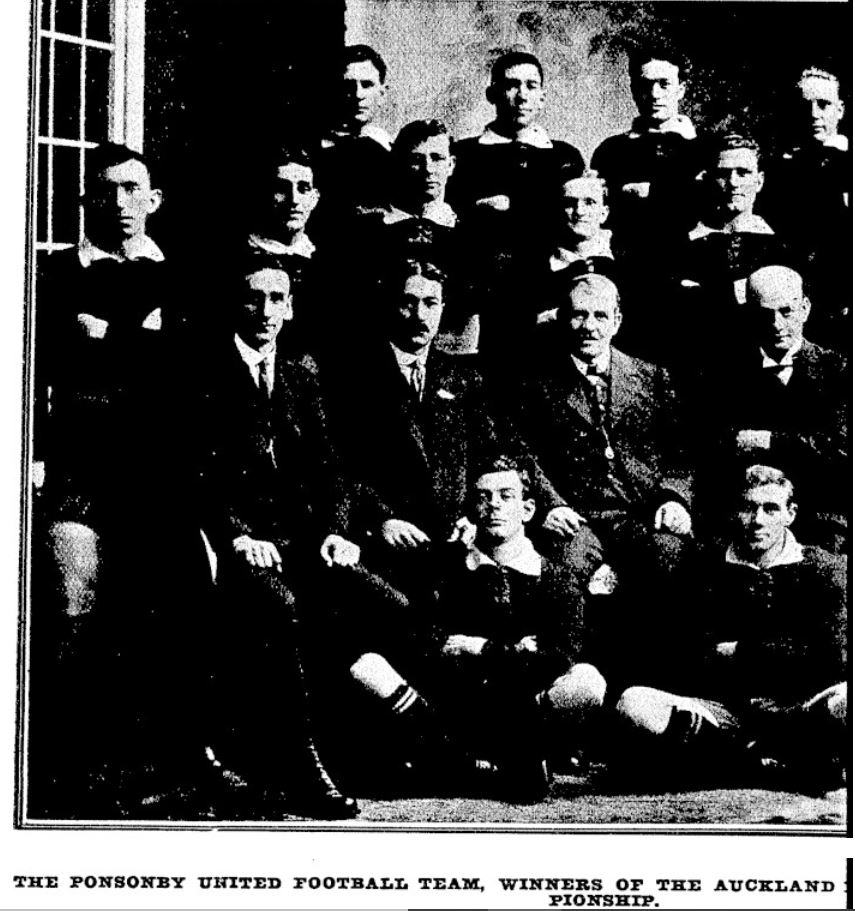
1917 Ponsonby first grade champions

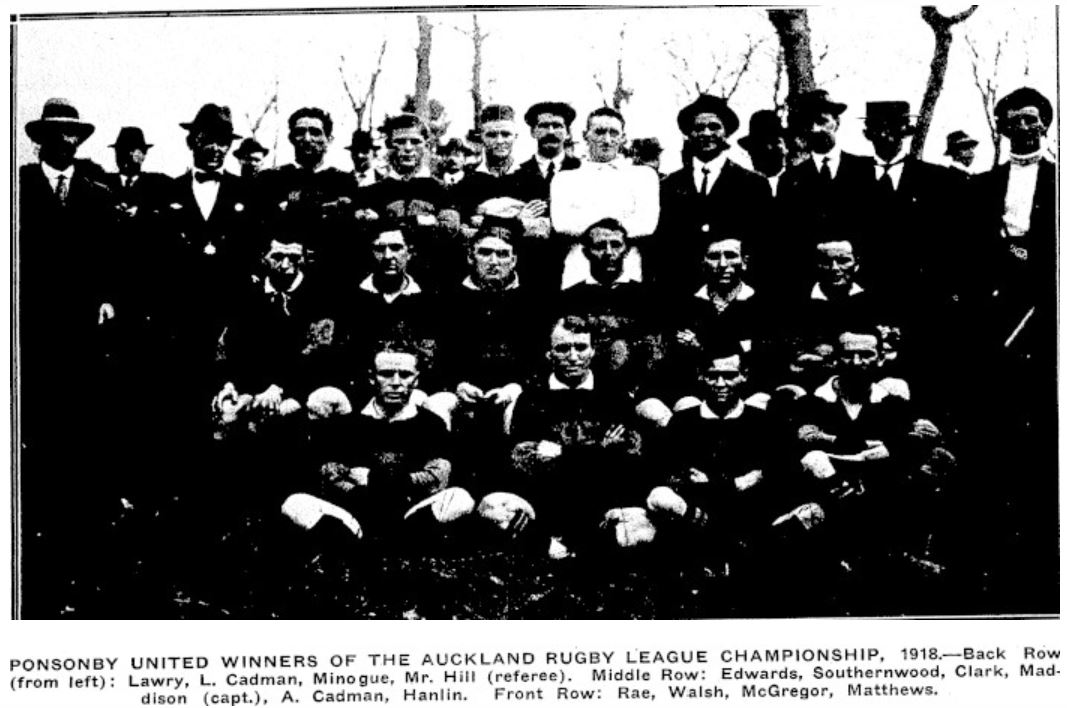
1918 Championship winners

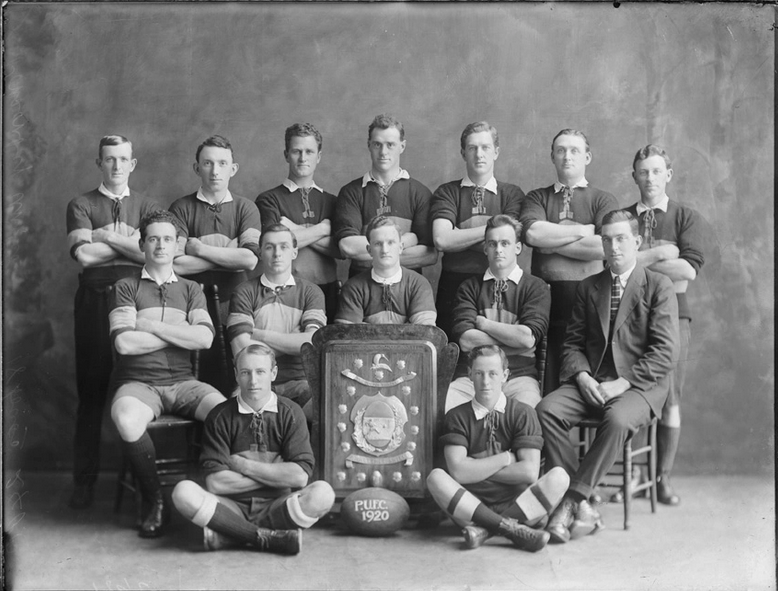
Ponsonby with the Thacker Shield in 1920.

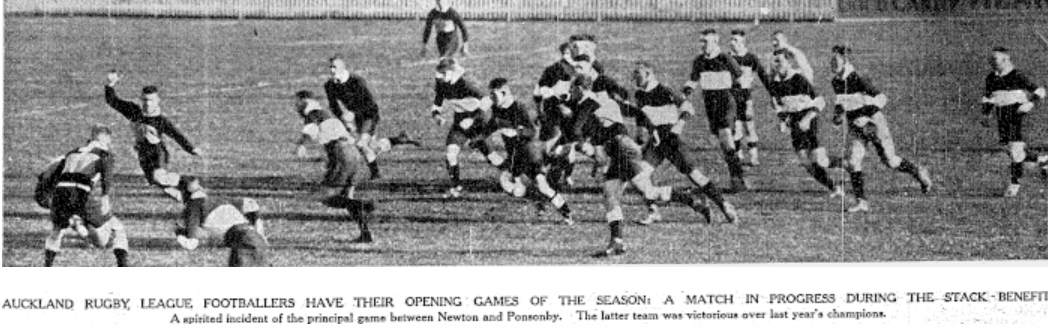
Newton v Ponsonby, April 24, 1928

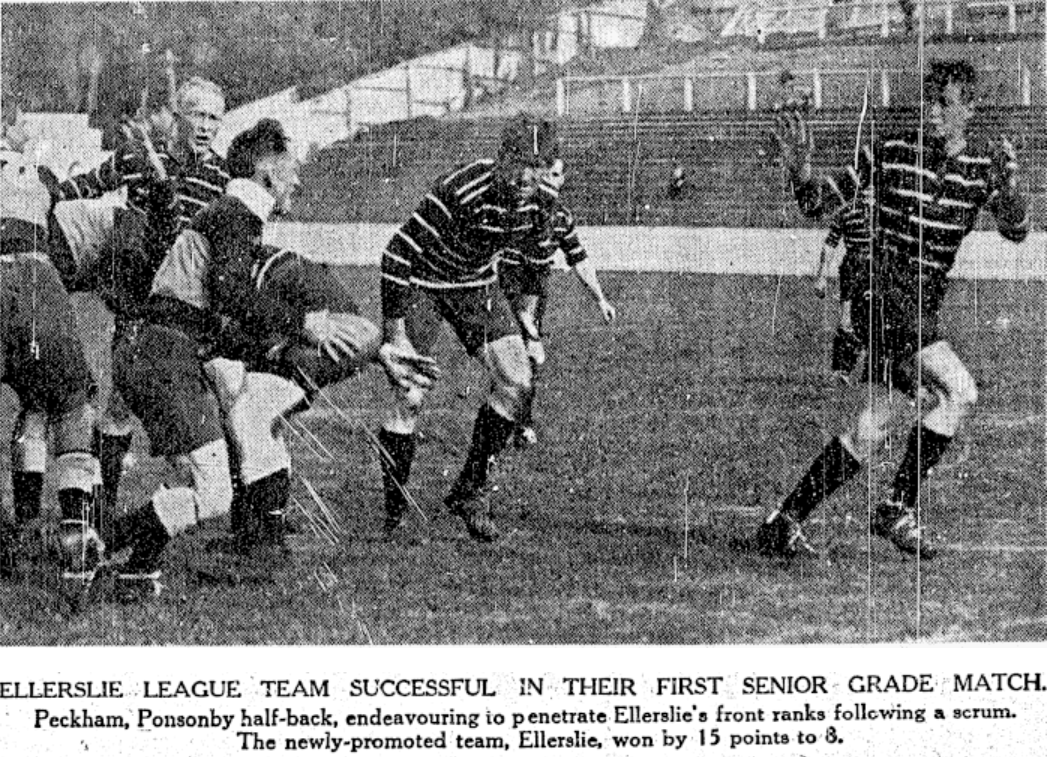
Ellerslie v Ponsonby, April 28, 1928

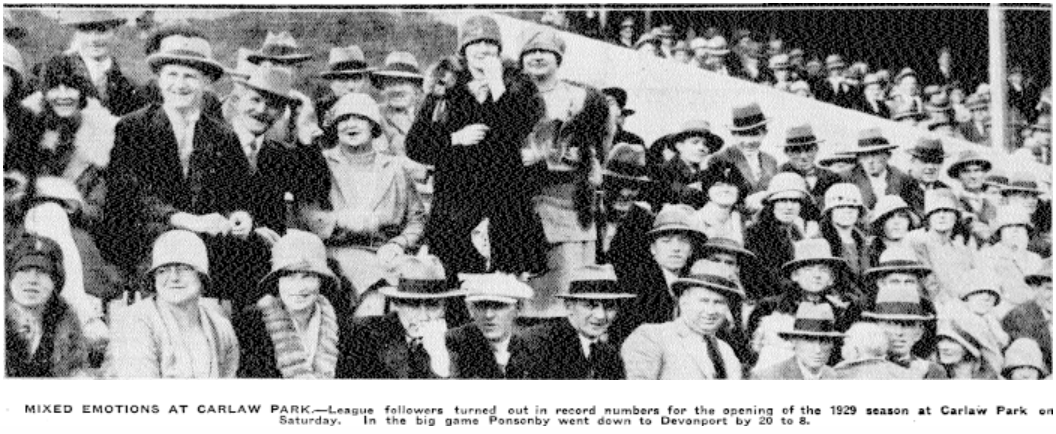

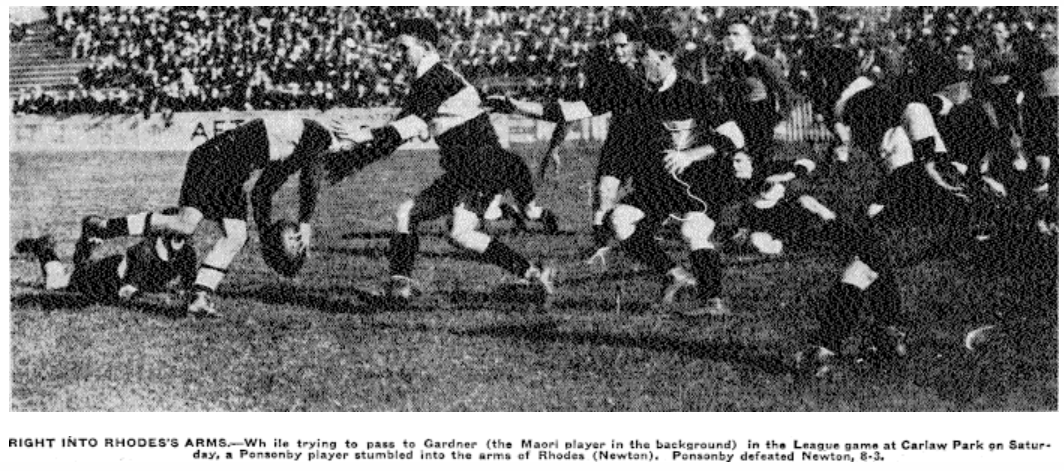

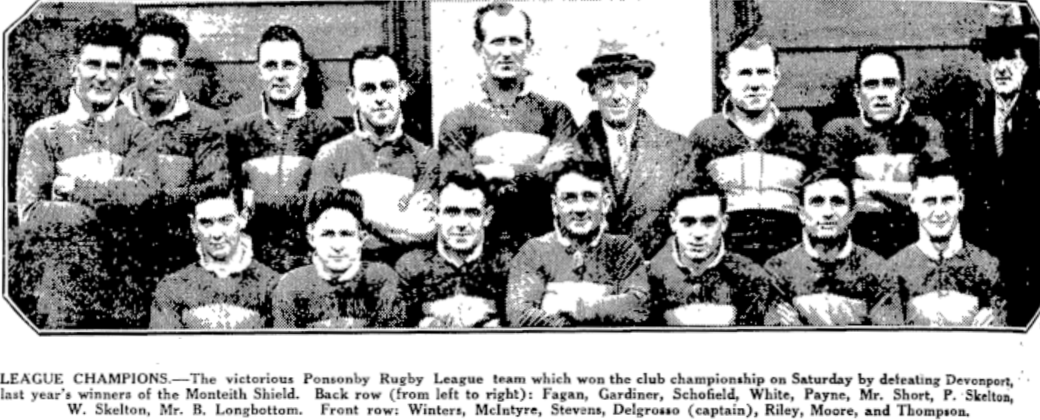

The 1912 Ponsonby squad included: Arthur Carlaw, Alf Chorley, Charlie Dunning, W Hooper, B Kean, Charles Webb, V Hunter, Tom Lynch, Scotch MacDonald, Harry Oakley, M Stanaway, Syd Riley, Billy Tyler and J Warner.

The Ponsonby United side which won the 1929 Auckland Rugby League championship. The club was founded in August 1908 by two returning All Golds, Billy Tyler and Charlie Dunning.

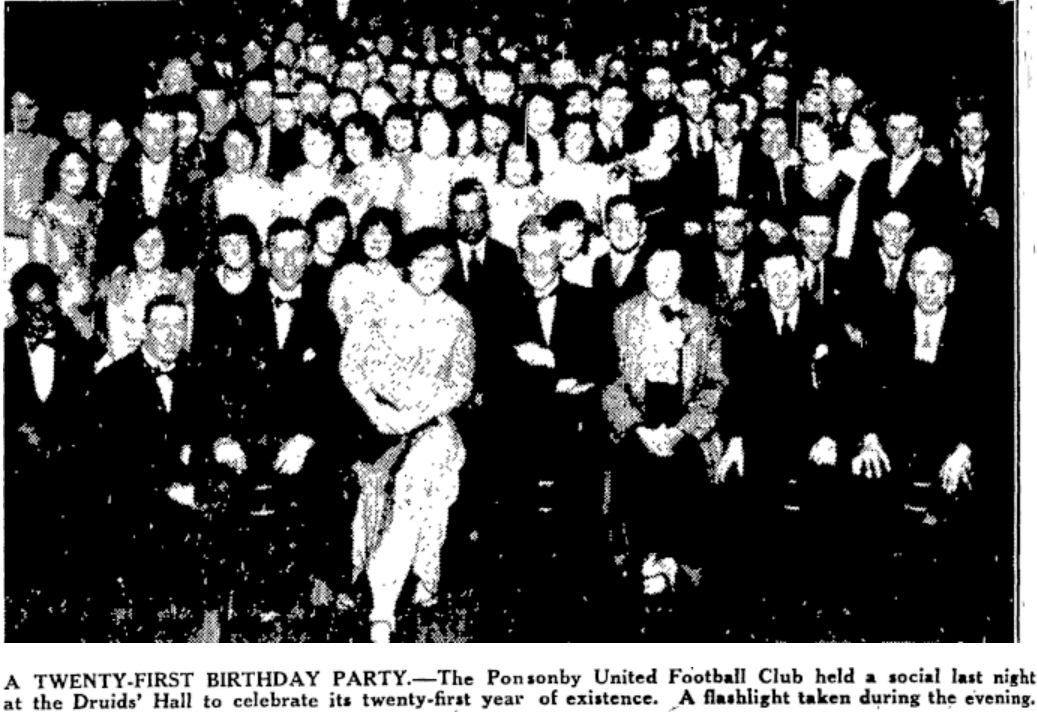

In 1920 Ponsonby won the Thacker Shield.

=== Leys Institute (1924-25) ===
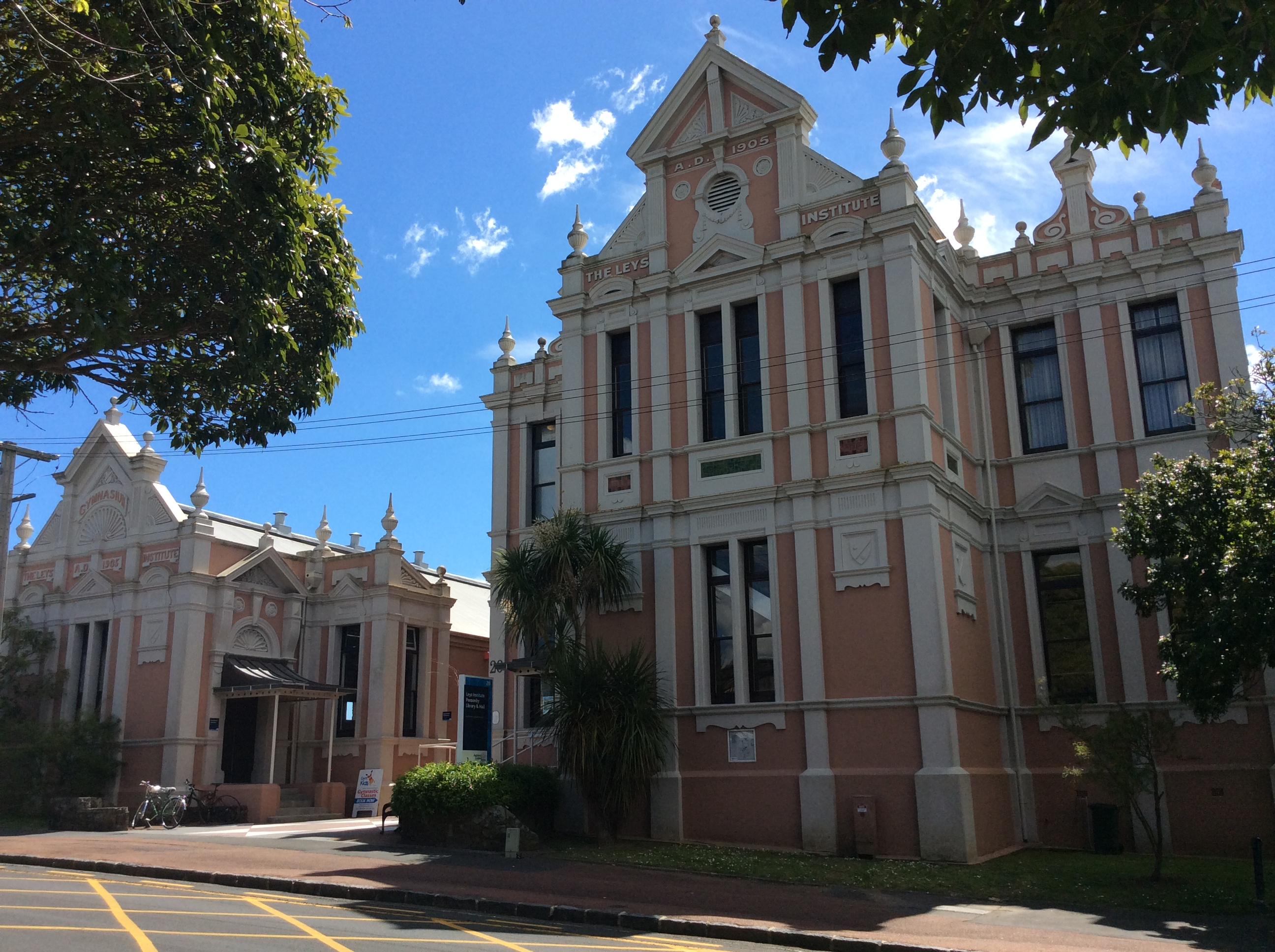
Leys Institute

In 1924 a Leys Institute side was formed which was affiliated with the Ponsonby club. They fielded 6th Grade teams in that season and in 1925 made up of boys from the area. The team was named after Thomas Wilson Leys who built a building which still stands today for boys to do something and stop them from loitering around 3 Lamps and the tavern later known as the Gluepot. Leys died in 1924 before the building was completed and his brother carried the project on. The team struggled in both seasons, finishing last in 6th Grade A in 1924 and second to last in 1925. The Ponsonby club would hold their meetings at the Leys Institute once it was completed.

=== 1930s ===
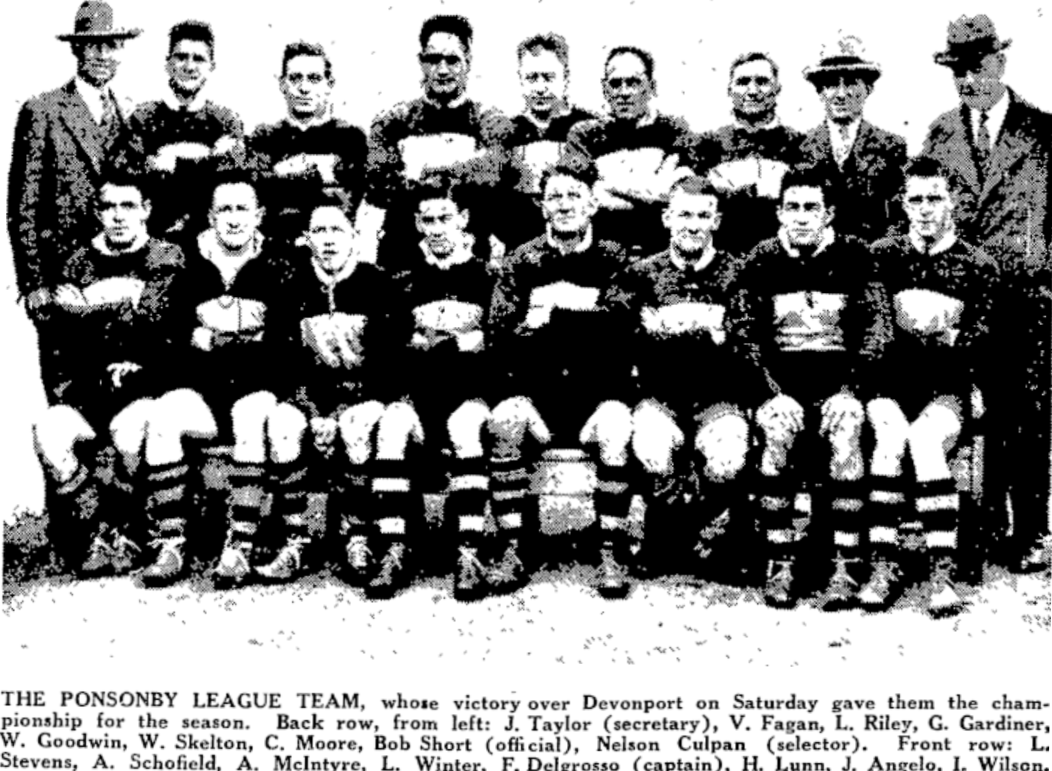

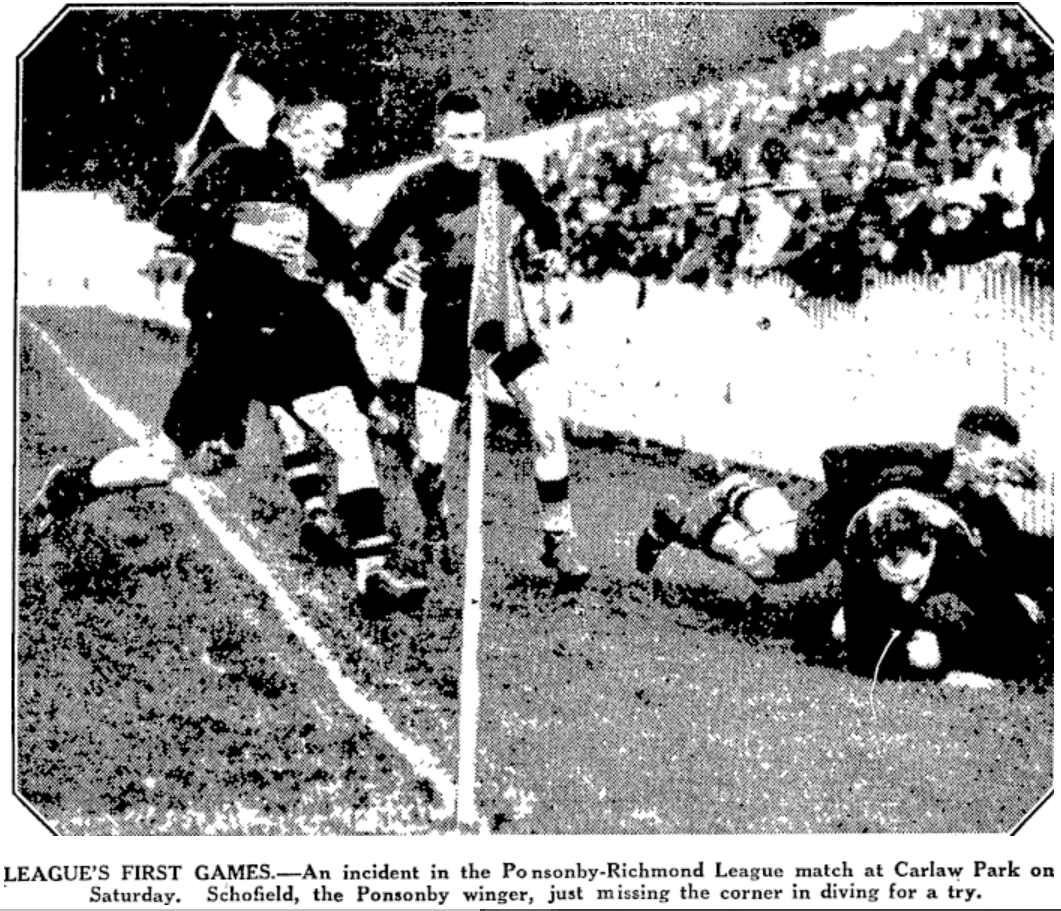

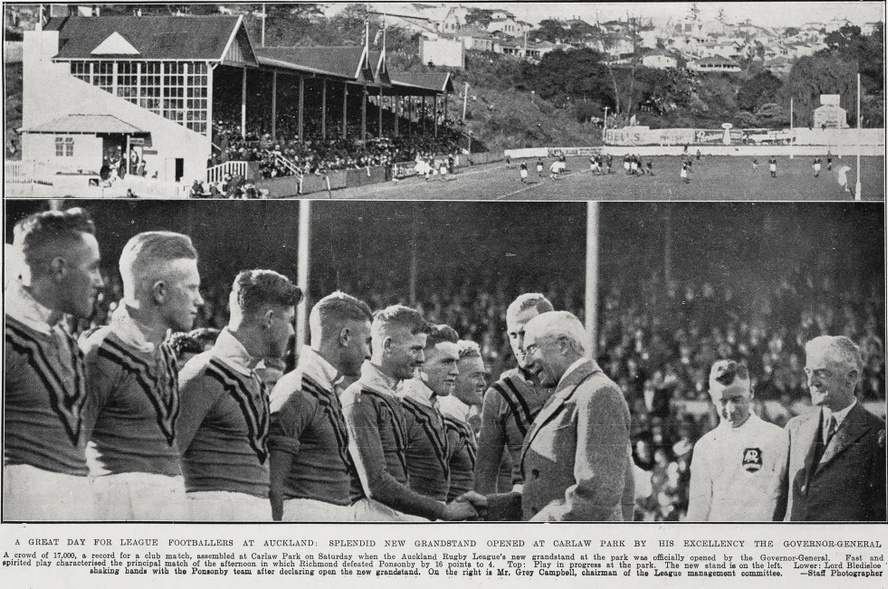
Ponsonby players meeting Lord Bledisloe on May 12, 1934, when the new grandstand at Carlaw Park was opened. Ponsonby captain Lou Hutt is introducing the players.

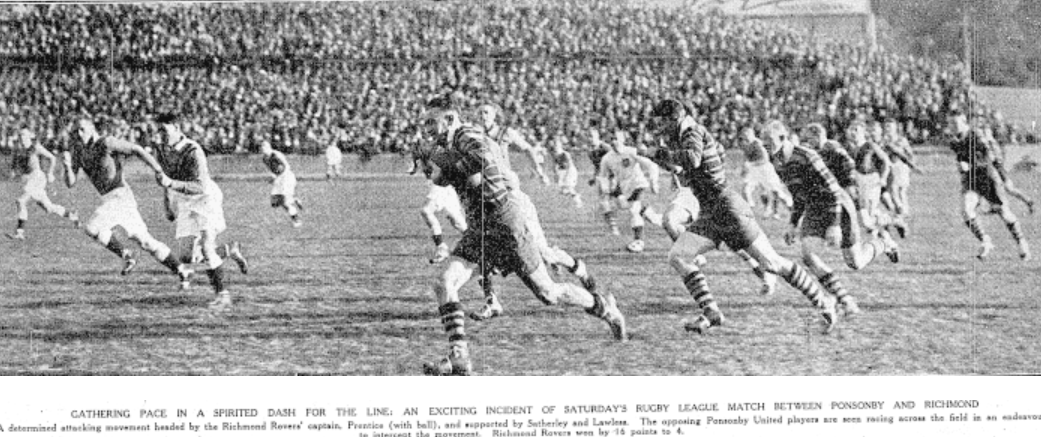

In 1930 Ponsonby celebrated their 21st anniversary with a social on October 13 at the Druids Hall.

=== 1950s ===
1952 saw the club win the "treble" of the Fox Memorial, Roope Rooster and Stormont Shield all in one year. This feat was to be repeated in 1972.

In 1979 the club merged with Maritime to form Ponsonby-Maritime however this merger only lasted until 1983. They were relegated in 1992, and have not regained a position in the first division since then.

The club celebrated its centenary in 2008.

Following the 2019 season, Auckland Rugby League denied the club entry to its competitive men's competitions indefinitely, citing the clubs inability to meet competitive criteria, despite Ponsonby making the playoffs in 2017 and 2018.

The 2020 season saw the club denied entry to field a male team in any Auckland competitive senior grade competition by ARL, though they did send a team to play the Kia Toa Tigers in Dunedin as a display of its ability to field a competitive team. Otago being the only league welcoming of the clubs attempts to play competitive matches.

Following this, Ponsonby formally entered a men's premier team in the 2021 Otago Rugby League Premiership, travelling to play all games in Otago between Dunedin and Oamaru. A mammoth undertaking for the club which displayed its desire to play competitive games, despite adversity.

Ponsonby won the 2021 Otago Rugby League Minor Premiership, before COVID-19 prevented their ability to travel and participate in the scheduled Grand Final against Otago University, who Ponsonby had defeated earlier in the season.

In 2022 they are fielding a team in the premier grade after several years of negotiations with Auckland Rugby League. Ponsonby were supported in their application by Glenfield, who offered to play in the reserve grade, allowing Ponsonby to compete in the Fox Memorial competition and return to competitive football in Auckland.

== Notable players ==
Between the years 1909 and 1986 Ponsonby developed 44 players that gained New Zealand representative status. Brackets indicates the year that they first represented New Zealand.

=== New Zealand Representatives ===
- Arthur Carlaw (1909)
- Ronald Amelioran MacDonald (1910)
- Alfred Chorley (1910)
- Charles Dunning (1910)
- Charles Savory (1911)
- Arthur Hardgrave (1912)
- Charles Albert Edward Webb (1912)
- James Clark (1913)
- Thomas Allen McClymont (1919)
- Arthur Matthews (1919)
- Horace Neal (1919)
- Samuel Arthur Lowrie (1919)
- Bill Walsh (1919)
- Frank August Delgrosso (1921)
- Joe Meadows (1921)
- Ivan Littlewood (1925)
- Hector Cole (1926)
- George Gardiner (1926)
- Lou Hutt (1928)
- Tim Peckham (1928)
- Arthur Kay (1933)
- Brian Riley (1935)
- Frank Halloran (1937)
- Travers Hardwick (1946)
- Len Jordan (1946)
- Roy Nurse (1946)
- Des White (1950)
- Douglas Richards-Jolley (1951)
- Bill Sorensen (1951)
- Joe Ratima (1952)
- Len Eriksen (1954)
- Rex Percy (1955)
- Keith Bell (1957)
- Bill Snowden (1959)
- Roger Bailey (1961)
- Jack Fagan (1961)
- Brian Lee (1961)
- Graham Mattson (1964)
- Ricky Carey (1967)
- Don Mann (1971)
- John O'Sullivan (1971)
- Brian Tracey (1972)
- Wayne Robertson (1974)
- Tom Conroy (1975)
- Joe Ropati (1986)

=== Auckland Representatives ===
1. Charles Dillamore (1908–1911)
2. Charles Dunning (1908–1912)
3. Ronald MacDonald (1908–1911)
4. Sid Riley (1908–1910)
5. Bill Tyler (1908–1909)
6. Jack Stanaway (1909)
7. Arthur Carlaw (1909–1913)
8. Harry Fricker (1910–1914)
9. Sydney Cole (1910–1911)
10. McPherson (1912)

=== Other ===
Brian Nordgren (1944-45 for Ponsonby)

== Club titles ==
=== Ponsonby grade championships (1910-1944) ===
- 1912 Second Grade and Third Grade
- 1913 Second Grade and Third Grade
- 1914 Third Grade
- 1917 First Grade (Myers Cup) and Second Grade
- 1918 First Grade (Myers Cup)
- 1919 First Grade (Myers Cup) and Sixth Grade
- 1920 Sixth Grade
- 1921 Sixth Grade B
- 1922 Third Grade
- 1923 Third Grade and Sixth Grade A
- 1924 Fourth Grade and Fifth Grade
- 1926 First Grade (Monteith Shield)
- 1929 First Grade (Monteith Shield)
- 1930 First Grade (Monteith Shield), Second Grade knockout, Third Grade and Third Grade knockout (10-3 v Marist)
- 1932 Third Grade
- 1935 Third Grade
- 1938 Sixth Grade and Schoolboys (Juniors)

== Ponsonby Senior Team Records (1910-1945, 1990, 1992-94, 2022-24) ==
The season record for the most senior men's team in the club.

Season	Grade	Name	Played	W	D	L	PF	PA	PD	Pts	Position (Teams)
1910	1st Grade (Myers Cup)	Ponsonby United	8	4	0	4	89	60	29	8	3rd of 4
1911	1st Grade (Myers Cup)	Ponsonby United	9	7	0	2	205	117	88	14	2nd of 5
1912	1st Grade (Myers Cup)	Ponsonby United	10	6	2	2	192	87	105	14	2nd of 6
1913	1st Grade (Myers Cup)	Ponsonby United	7	4	0	3	103	65	38	8	4th of 6
1914	1st Grade (Myers Cup)	Ponsonby United	10	7	1	2	102	58	44	15	2nd of 6 (Lost 13-2 v Newton in a playoff)
1915	1st Grade	Ponsonby United	9	5	1	3	93	63	30	11	3rd of 6
1916	1st Grade	Ponsonby United	10	4	1	5	101	86	15	9	4th of 6
1917	1st Grade	Ponsonby United	8	7	0	1	109	51	58	14	1st of 6
1918	1st Grade	Ponsonby United	9	8	0	1	103	53	50	16	1st of 6
1919	1st Grade (Myers Cup)	Ponsonby United	9	7	1	1	110	50	60	15	1st of 8
1920	1st Grade (Myers Cup)	Ponsonby United	11	2	2	7	125	160	-35	6	6th of 7
1921	1st Grade (Monteith)	Ponsonby United	9	5	0	4	129	99	30	10	4th of 7
1922	1st Grade (Monteith)	Ponsonby United	14	10	0	4	205	169	36	20	2nd of 8
1923	1st Grade (Monteith)	Ponsonby United	12	4	0	8	118	179	-61	8	5th of 7
1924	1st Grade (Monteith)	Ponsonby United	15	8	0	7	188	144	44	16	5th of 9
1925	1st Grade (Monteith)	Ponsonby United	12	10	0	2	271	113	158	20	2nd of 7
1926	1st Grade (Monteith)	Ponsonby United	12	10	0	2	256	153	103	20	1st of 7 (Beat City 13–8 in a playoff)
1927	1st Grade (Monteith)	Ponsonby United	13	9	1	3	190	111	79	19	2nd of 7
1928	1st Grade (Monteith)	Ponsonby United	12	5	2	5	154	144	10	12	4th of 7
1929	1st Grade (Monteith)	Ponsonby United	15	12	1	2	276	116	160	25	1st of 8
1930	1st Grade (Monteith)	Ponsonby United	13	11	0	2	190	138	52	22	1st of 8
1931	1st Grade (Fox)	Ponsonby United	12	6	1	5	152	143	9	13	4th of 7
1932	1st Grade (Fox)	Ponsonby United	10	6	0	4	159	158	1	12	3rd of 6
1933	1st Grade (Fox)	Ponsonby United	10	2	0	8	143	247	-104	4	6th of 6
1934	1st Grade (Fox)	Ponsonby United	13	7	0	6	139	142	-3	14	3rd of 6
1935	1st Grade (Fox)	Ponsonby United	12	3	1	8	157	197	-40	7	6th of 7
1936	1st Grade (Fox)	Ponsonby United	13	7	0	6	191	186	5	14	5th of 8
1937	1st Grade (Fox)	Ponsonby United	14	7	1	6	177	151	26	15	5th of 8
1938	1st Grade (Fox)	Ponsonby United	16	8	0	8	176	187	-11	16	6th of 9
1939	1st Grade (Fox)	Ponsonby United	15	7	1	7	176	204	-28	15	5th of 9
1940	1st Grade (Fox)	Ponsonby United	15	7	0	8	164	183	-19	14	6th of 9
1941	1st Grade (Fox)	Ponsonby United	15	6	2	7	171	169	2	14	6th of 9
1942	1st Grade (Fox)	Ponsonby United	15	7	0	8	119	210	-91	14	3rd of 6
1943	1st Grade (Fox)	Ponsonby United	15	4	0	11	163	231	-68	8	7th of 9
1944	1st Grade (Fox)	Ponsonby United	18	10	2	6	158	155	3	22	5th of 10
1945	1st Grade (Fox)	Ponsonby United	14	9	0	5	222	155	67	18	3rd of 10
	Playoffs		2	1	0	1	31	25	6		
	Roope Rooster		1	0	0	1	13	19	-6		L in R1
	Phelan Shield		3	3	0	0	57	40	17		W final 18-15 v City
1990	Cleanaway Div 2	Ponsonby United	21	15	3	3	525	247	212.6%	33	1st of 8
1992	Strand Prem 2	Ponsonby	18	2	0	16	217	491	44.2%	4	10th of 10
1993	Projex Prem 2/3 Grading	Ponsonby	15	7	0	8	355	362	92.5%	14	11th of 15
-	Projex Premier 3	Ponsonby	8	6	0	2	232	141	164.5%	12	3rd of 8, lost to Tuakau in SF
1994	Premier 2	Ponsonby	26	7	0	19	511	785	65.1%	14	11th of 14
2022	1st Grade (Fox)	Ponsonby United	9	3	0	6	228	444	51%	6	8th of 10 in section 1, L v Pakuranga 46–14 in Champ. prel. final
2023	Sharman Cup	Ponsonby	11	7	1	3	370	186		15	4th of 10
	Playoffs		2	1	0	1	48	40			
2024	Fox Qualifying	Ponsonby	3	0	0	3	28	124		0	4th of 4
	Sharman Cup		10	7	1	2	414	196		15	4th of 10
	Playoffs		3	2	0	1	68	58			L final 12-22 v Northcote
1910-45, 1990, 1992–94, 2022–24	TOTAL		599	317	25	257	9683	9054	-	643	

=== Top point scorers (1909-1945) ===
The point scoring lists are compiled from matches played in the first grade side including championship, Roope Rooster, Phelan Shield, and all other organised official matches.

Rank	Player	Start	End	Appearances	Tries	Con	Pen	DG	Mk	Pts
1	Frank Delgrosso	1919	1934	192	57	210	97	1	0	787
2	Arthur Kay	1933	1945	181	78	87	62	0	0	532
3	George Gardiner	1925	1932	93	46	37	12	0	0	236
4	Thomas McClymont	1913	1924	110	29	52	9	0	1	211
5	R.O. Jones	1933	1937	76	14	59	25	0	0	210
6	Leonard Riley	1922	1933	110	58	3	0	0	0	180
7=	A (Tab) Cross	1912	1921	69	7	46	27	0	2	171
7=	Brian Nordgren	1944	1945	26	27	29	16	0	0	171
9	Brian Riley	1933	1943	115	55	0	0	0	0	165
10	Ivan Littlewood	1922	1934	63	46	9	0	0	0	156
11	Roy Nurse	1937	1945	-	39	4	9	0	0	143
12	Eric McGregor	1918	1923	61	31	7	2	0	0	111
13	Dougie McGregor	1920	1922	40	18	19	6	0	1	106
14	Tim Peckham	1925	1928	57	16	26	1	0	0	102
15	Lou Hutt	1926	1935	100	33	1	0	0	0	101
16	Roy Bright	1930	1935	31	17	13	6	0	0	89
17	Pat Skelton	1929	1932	29	20	6	2	3	0	82
18	Charles Webb	1912	1916	34	5	12	17	3	1	81
19	Charles Savory	1911	1914	21	17	6	2	0	0	77
20	Walter Stockley	1934	1938	65	18	8	3	0	0	76
21	Edgar Morgan	1936	1939	68	21	5	0	0	0	73
22=	A Schofield	1929	1931	53	24	0	0	0	0	72
22=	Albert (Bert) Payne	1925	1929	78	24	0	0	0	0	72
22=	A Schofield	1928	1931	53	24	0	0	0	0	72
25	Des Williams	1939	1945	-	23	1	0	0	0	71
26	Victor Fagan	1924	1933	127	21	3	0	0	0	69
27	Bill Walsh	1914	1924	80	20	2	2	0	0	68
28	Sydney Cole	1910	1912	18	5	26	0	0	0	67
29	H Godley	1924	1928	37	22	0	0	0	0	66
30=	John Jones	1915	1917	38	20	0	1	0	0	62
30=	C "Dooley" Moore	1924	1930	83	18	3	1	0	0	62

=== Head to Head records ===
Head To Head
Opponent	Start	End	Games	Wins	Draws	Losses	For	Against
Eden Ramblers	1911	1913	5	4	1	0	158	33
Grafton Athletic	1914	1922	16	11	0	5	233	118
Waterside Workers	1917	-	1	1	0	0	14	3
Combined AKL Club XIII	1917	-	1	1	0	0	21	21
Railway	1917	-	1	0	0	1	3	12
Maritime	1918	1930	22	13	1	8	451	320
Sydenham	1918	-	1	1	0	0	11	0
Federal (Christchurch)	1920	-	1	1	0	0	29	19
Hamilton	1920	1931	2	0	0	2	42	65
Petone	1921	-	1	1	0	0	18	13
Huntly	1921	1930	2	2	0	0	30	11
Māngere United/Rangers	1924	-	2	2	0	0	48	10
Taupiri	1926	-	1	1	0	0	16	6
Rotorua	1927	-	2	2	0	0	33	23
Hikurangi (Northland)	1928	-	2	2	0	0	39	24
Hikurangi & Whangarei City XIII	1928	-	1	1	0	0	23	10
Ngaruawahia	1930	-	1	1	0	0	32	29
Ellerslie-Otahuhu	1931	-	2	1	0	1	44	25
Western Suburbs	1934	-	1	0	0	1	13	26
St George (Wellington)	1937	-	1	0	1	0	20	20
TOTAL	1911	1937	66	45	3	18	1,278	788

== Gallery ==
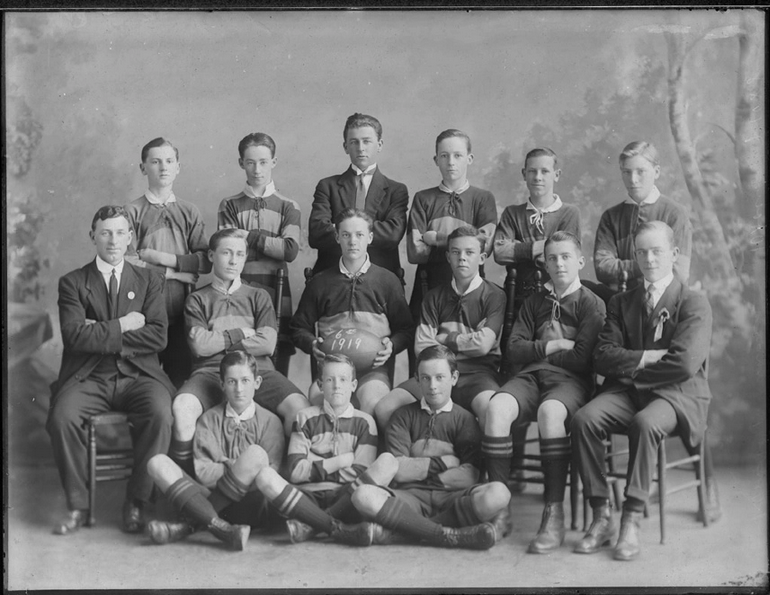
Ponsonby 6th grade champions in 1919
