= Bill Walsh (rugby league) =

New Zealand international rugby league footballer

Personal information
- Full name: William George Walsh
- Born: 24 August 1891 New Zealand
- Died: 3 June 1981 (aged 89) Auckland, New Zealand

Playing information
- Position: Halfback
Club
Years	Team	Pld	T	G	FG	P
1914–24	Ponsonby United	80	20	4	0	68
1917	Ponsonby-North Shore	1	2	0	0	6
	Total	81	22	4	0	74
Representative
Years	Team	Pld	T	G	FG	P
1915–18	Auckland	3	0	0	0	0
1919–21	New Zealand	7	3	0	0	9

William George Walsh was a New Zealand rugby league player. He first played for New Zealand in 1919 on the tour of Australia and became Kiwi number 122. He ended with 8 matches for New Zealand in total playing one test against Australia. He played his entire club career with the Ponsonby United club in the Auckland Rugby League.

== Playing career ==
=== Ponsonby United ===
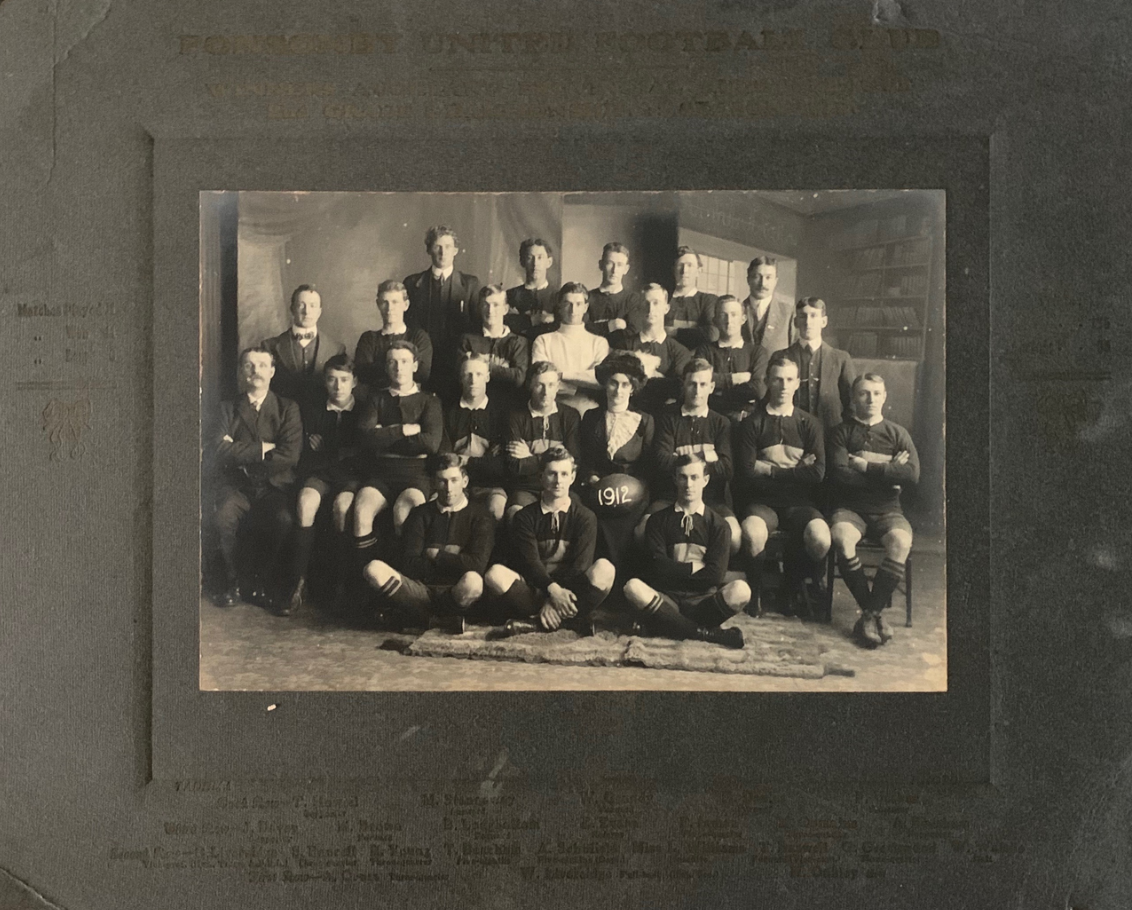
Bill Walsh on the right hand side of the first row of seated players in the 1912 2nd Grade champion Ponsonby side.

In 1914 Bill Walsh was tipped to make the Ponsonby senior team after previously having played in their second grade team, and to go on to representative honours. He was described as a “fast and tricky player”. Indeed, he was to debut for their senior side this year playing alongside Kiwi legend Thomas McClymont. He would go on to play for Ponsonby for 11 seasons from 1914 to 1924 which was an extraordinary period of time in that era, particularly for one club. He was part of their team which won 3 titles in 1917, 18 and 19. They were the first club to do this. He also won the Roope Rooster with Ponsonby in 1917, 1922, and 1923. In his 11 years with the Ponsonby senior team Walsh scored 17 tries and kicked 3 goals.

=== Auckland debut ===
Walsh made his representative debut for Auckland in 1915 against Thames. Auckland won the match 27 to 16 at Victoria Park in front of 4,000 spectators. He was unfortunate, in terms of his representative career, in that his early playing years occurred during the war. Auckland Rugby League had made the decision to play little to no representative matches in this time. In the 4 years prior to the outbreak of war Auckland played 34 representative matches while during the 4 years of the war this dropped to just 8. His second match for Auckland was in the return match against Thames when the team travelled to their opponents home and went down 13–25. They travelled by boat on board the Wakatere along with 350 supporters.

In 1917 Walsh played in a charity match for the combined Ponsonby-North Shore team against a City-Newton combined team. The match was to raise money for the family of the late William Mackrell. Ponsonby-North Shore won the match with Walsh scoring 2 tries. Despite being a back Walsh was not renowned for his try scoring ability, averaging around 2 tries a season throughout his career. In 1918 Walsh played in a Thacker Shield match for Ponsonby against Sydenham in Christchurch. Ponsonby was the challenging team as Sydenham were the holders. Ponsonby won 11–0 to bring the trophy to Auckland where it would remain for several years until a ruling by New Zealand rugby league. They ruled that the trophy had originally been donated and intended to be played for by rugby league teams in the South Island. Walsh scored a try in the win.

In 1918 Walsh played for Auckland in a 45-9 thrashing of Canterbury at the Auckland Domain in front of 10,000 spectators.

=== New Zealand selection ===
The 1919 season was to be the most significant season for Walsh as he gained selection for the New Zealand team on their tour of Australia.

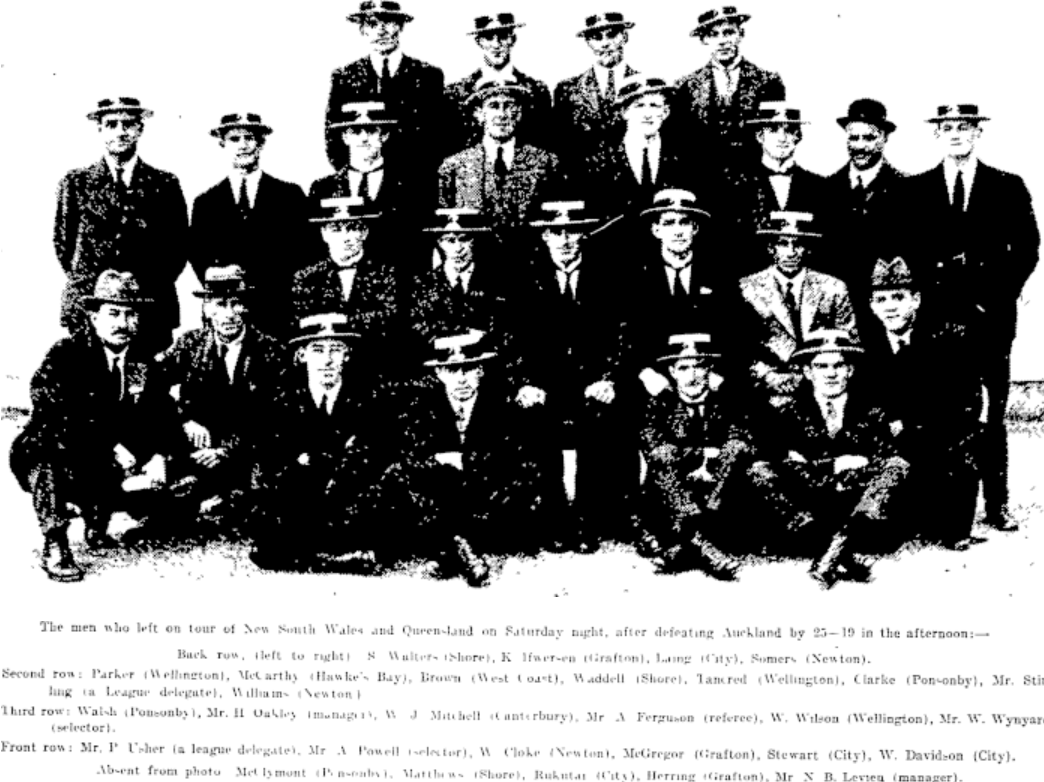
The 1919 New Zealand team to tour New South Wales and Queensland. Bill Walsh is seated in the second row on the left.

He played in 5 of the 11 tour matches playing in the halfback position in each of them. His New Zealand debut was against New South Wales Firsts in an 18–23 defeat on June 17 at the Sydney Cricket Ground in front of 46,157 spectators. He played again in the second tour match against the same opponent with New Zealand losing 9-20. Walsh experienced a win in a New Zealand jersey for the first time in their 11–8 victory over Northern Division at the Newcastle Showgrounds with Walsh scoring a try. He scored again against the New South Wales Firsts team in a high scoring match with New Zealand going down 31-39 before 20,000 fans at the Royal Agricultural Society Showground in Sydney. Walsh's last tour match was to be in the 6th match of the tour. Walsh was paired with the prolific Karl Ifwersen in the halves and New Zealand ran the New South Wales team close before going down 19–22. Walsh was injured in the match and was unable to play again in the tour.

His one and only test was against Australia when they toured later in the 1919 season. New Zealand suffered a 23–34 loss at the Auckland Domain in front of 24,300 spectators. Walsh played halfback alongside George Bradley at standoff.

Walsh played for Auckland on August 20 against King Country at the newly opened Carlaw Park. Auckland trounced their opponents 58–25.

=== Boating tragedy ===
On April 1, 1923 Walsh was involved in a serious boating accident on the Tairua Bar which claimed the lives of 4 people. He was one of seven onboard the launch, Lorraine when it capsized shortly before 9pm on the Tairua Bar. The boat had attended a regatta at Whitianga when it was returning. There was a strong wind and heavy seas at the time. The deceased were William Southernwood (a Ponsonby teammate), H Chappell, T Culhane, and N Robson all of Auckland. When the launch capsized Walsh and T Jenkins were trying to retrieve the dinghy when Walsh got his feet tangled in fishing line. Three breaking waves then struck them smashing the boat into "matchwood". One of the survivors, Silston Cory-Wright had managed to secure a benzine tin to hold on to in the water. Walsh was described as being "nearly done for" but was saved by Cory-Wright who had also cleared Walsh's feet of fishing line from which he had become entangled and reached him with the benzine tin. Cory-Wright then managed to put a life belt over Walsh's shoulders and kept him afloat until they could be pulled onboard. Both men were described as being "in a pretty bad way". Prime Minister William Massey telegraphed to Tairua his sincere sympathy from himself and his wife for the bereaved relatives. Walsh recovered sufficiently and was able to assume the position of club captain which he had been elected to for the 1923 season.

=== Retirement ===
In 1928 Walsh turned out for a charity “Old Timers’ Match” as curtain raiser to the Newton Rangers v Ponsonby United Roope Rooster semi-final replay.
