= 2012 Queensland Cup =

- Duration: March 10 – September 23, 2012
- Teams: 12
- Premiers: Wynnum Manly Seagulls (2nd title)
- Minor premiers: Redcliffe Dolphins (4th title)
- Matches played: 138
- Points scored: 6,617
- Top points scorer: Liam Georgetown (300)
- Player of the year: Luke Capewell (Courier Mail Medal)
- Top try-scorer: Liam Georgetown (29)

The 2012 Queensland Cup season was the 17th season of the top-level rugby league competition in Queensland, Australia. It was run by the Queensland Rugby League. The competition, known as the Intrust Super Cup due to sponsorship from Intrust Super, featured 12 teams playing a 26-week long season (including finals) from March to September.

The Wynnum Manly Seagulls became the second team to win back-to-back premierships after defeating the Redcliffe Dolphins 20–10 in the Grand Final at Suncorp Stadium. Redcliffe Dolphins' halfback Luke Capewell was named the competition's Player of the Year, winning the Courier Mail Medal.

== Teams ==
In 2012, the lineup of teams remained unchanged for the fourth consecutive year. The Central Comets began playing as the Central Queensland Capras again after using the Comets moniker for 12 seasons. The Canberra Raiders ended their four-year affiliation with the Souths Logan Magpies, opting to return to the New South Wales Cup competition.

Colours	Club	Home ground(s)	Head coach(s)	Captain(s)	NRL Affiliate
	Burleigh Bears	Pizzey Park	Paul Bramley → Carl Briggs	Darren Griffiths	Gold Coast Titans
	Central Queensland Capras	Browne Park	John Harbin	Tim Glasby	Brisbane Broncos
	Easts Tigers	Langlands Park	Troy McCarthy	Shane Neumann	Melbourne Storm
	Ipswich Jets	North Ipswich Reserve	Ben & Shane Walker	Keiron Lander	Gold Coast Titans
	Mackay Cutters	Virgin Australia Stadium	Anthony Seibold	Grant Rovelli	North Queensland Cowboys
	Northern Pride	Barlow Park	David Maiden	Ty Williams	North Queensland Cowboys
	Norths Devils	Bishop Park	Craig Hodges	Matt Smith	Brisbane Broncos
	Redcliffe Dolphins	Dolphin Oval	John Dixon	Isaak Ah Mau	Brisbane Broncos
	Souths Logan Magpies	Davies Park	Mark Beaumont	Phil Dennis	None
	Sunshine Coast Sea Eagles	Sunshine Coast Stadium	Dave Cordwell	Todd Murphy	None
	Tweed Heads Seagulls	Piggabeen Sports Complex	Ben Anderson	Brad Davis	Gold Coast Titans
	Wynnum Manly Seagulls	BMD Kougari Oval	Paul Green	Luke Dalziel-Don	Brisbane Broncos

== Ladder ==
2012 Queensland Cup
Pos	Team	Pld	W	D	L	PF	PA	PD	Pts
1	Redcliffe Dolphins	22	17	0	5	724	390	334	34
2	Wynnum Manly Seagulls (P)	22	16	1	5	624	436	188	33
3	Tweed Heads Seagulls	22	14	1	7	530	473	57	29
4	Ipswich Jets	22	13	2	7	520	421	99	28
5	Norths Devils	22	12	2	8	654	510	144	26
6	Easts Tigers	22	13	0	9	621	496	125	26
7	Northern Pride	22	12	1	9	554	497	57	25
8	Mackay Cutters	22	10	0	12	488	544	-56	20
9	Burleigh Bears	22	7	1	14	427	479	-52	15
10	Central Queensland Capras	22	5	1	16	432	743	-311	11
11	Sunshine Coast Sea Eagles	22	4	1	17	376	699	-323	9
12	Souths Logan Magpies	22	3	2	17	422	684	-262	8

== Finals series ==
In 2012, the Queensland Cup competition returned to a five-team finals series for the first time since 2008.

Home	Score	Away	Match Information
Home	Score	Away	Date and Time (Local)	Venue
Qualifying / Elimination Finals
Ipswich Jets	20 – 26	Norths Devils	1 September 2012, 2:00pm	North Ipswich Reserve
Wynnum Manly Seagulls	16 – 19	Tweed Heads Seagulls	2 September 2012, 2:10pm	BMD Kougari Oval
Semi-finals
Wynnum Manly Seagulls	30 – 22	Norths Devils	8 September 2012, 2:00pm	BMD Kougari Oval
Redcliffe Dolphins	32 – 16	Tweed Heads Seagulls	9 September 2012, 1:15pm	Dolphin Oval
Preliminary Final
Wynnum Manly Seagulls	30 – 4	Tweed Heads Seagulls	16 September 2012, 1:50pm	BMD Kougari Oval
Grand Final
Redcliffe Dolphins	10 – 20	Wynnum Manly Seagulls	23 September 2012, 4:00pm	Suncorp Stadium

Qualifying / Elimination Finals
2	Wynnum Manly	16
3	Tweed Heads	19
4	Ipswich	20
5	Norths	26

Major / Minor Semi-finals
1	Redcliffe	32
Tweed Heads	16
Wynnum Manly	30
Norths	22

Preliminary Final
Tweed Heads	4
Wynnum Manly	30

Grand Final
Redcliffe	10
Wynnum Manly	20

== Grand Final ==
Sunday, 23 September

Redcliffe Dolphins	10 – 20	Wynnum Manly Seagulls
Tries: Delroy Berryman 1 Liam Georgetown 1 Goals: Liam Georgetown 1	1st: 6 - 6; 2nd: 4 - 14; Report	Tries: 1 Jacob Fauid; 1 Charlie Gubb; 1 Peter Gubb; 1 Jason Moon; Goals: 1 Dane Carlaw; 1 Matt Seamark

Suncorp Stadium
Referee: Clayton Sharpe
Player of the Match: Luke Dalziel-Don (Wynnum Manly)

Redcliffe Dolphins	Position	Wynnum Manly Seagulls
1. Joe Bond	FB	1. Sean Loxley
2. Delroy Berryman	WG	2. Peter Gubb
3. Marty Hatfield	CE	3. Daniel Wallace
4. Aaron Whitchurch	CE	4. Jason Moon
5. Liam Georgetown	WG	5. Nathanael Barnes
6. Maurice Kennedy	FE	6. Jacob Fauid
7. Luke Capewell	HB	7. Matt Seamark
8. Matt Handcock	PR	8. Ben Shea
15. Todd Murphy	HK	9. Jake Granville
10. Isaak Ah Mau (c)	PR	10. Dane Carlaw
11. Troy Giess	SR	11. Mitchell Dodds
12. Derrick Watkins	SR	12. John Te Reo
13. Nick Slyney	LK	13. Luke Dalziel-Don (c)
9. Tom Butterfield	Bench	15. Matt Smith
14. Tui Samoa	Bench	16. Andrew Clayton
16. James Ackerman	Bench	17. Charlie Gubb
17. Paul Ivan	Bench	20. Tim Natusch
John Dixon	Coach	Paul Green

Redcliffe finished the regular season in first and won the minor premiership for the first time since 2002. They qualified for their 10th Grand Final after defeating Tweed Heads in the major semi final. It would be their first Grand Final appearance since 2007. Reigning premiers Wynnum Manly finished in second and faced Tweed Heads in the qualifying final, losing 16–19. This sent them to the Week 2 elimination final, where they defeated Norths 30–22. In the preliminary final, they got their revenge on Tweed, winning 30–4 to qualify for their second consecutive Grand Final.

=== First half ===
Redcliffe opened the scoring the Grand Final with a try to winger Liam Georgetown after a 40-metre line break from Marty Hatfield. In a low scoring half, Wynnum Manly levelled the scores five minutes before the break when a Luke Dalziel-Don offload found five-eighth Jacob Fauid who scored near the uprights.

=== Second half ===
The Seagulls came out firing in the second half, opening the scoring in the 42nd minute when centre Jason Moon crossed out wide. They extended their lead to eight after capitalising on a Dolphins' error, with winger Peter Gubb scoring in the 53rd minute. With six minutes remaining, the Dolphins set up a thrilling finish when winger Delroy Berryman scored after a Luke Capewell chip kick found fullback Joe Bond, who in turn found Berryman. Wynnum Manly sealed the victory, and their second premiership, in the 78th minute when interchange prop Charlie Gubb barged over under the posts. Retiring forward Dane Carlaw converted the try from in front to end his career on a high. Wynnum Manly became just the second club, after Redcliffe in 2002–2003, to win back-to-back premierships.

The 2012 Grand Final would be the last game at the club for Seagulls' head coach Paul Green, who joined the Sydney Roosters as an assistant to the NRL side and head coach of the under-20 side in 2013. In 2014, Green became head coach of the North Queensland Cowboys and reunited with Jake Granville a year later, as the pair won the 2015 NRL Grand Final.

== End-of-season awards ==
- Courier Mail Medal (Best and Fairest): Luke Capewell ( Redcliffe Dolphins)
- Coach of the Year: Ben & Shane Walker ( Ipswich Jets)
- Rookie of the Year: Ethan Lowe ( Northern Pride)
- Representative Player of the Year: Grant Rovelli ( Queensland Residents, Mackay Cutters)

== See also ==
- Queensland Cup
- Queensland Rugby League
