= New South Wales Residents rugby league team =

Australian rugby team

New South Wales Residents
Team information
- Nickname: Blues
- Governing body: New South Wales Rugby League
- Head coach: Shane Millard
- Captain: Kyle Flanagan
- Home stadium: ANZ Stadium (83,500)

Uniforms
First colours

Team results
- First game
- New South Wales 30–22 Queensland (Suncorp Stadium, Brisbane, Australia; 1994)
- Biggest win
- New South Wales 44–14 Queensland (Suncorp Stadium Brisbane, Australia; 1995)
- Biggest defeat
- Queensland 34–6 New South Wales (Lang Park, Brisbane, Australia; 15 July 2009)

The New South Wales Residents rugby league team is a representative rugby league team consisting of players who compete in the Intrust Super Premiership (NSW Cup) competition. They currently play an annual fixture against QLD Cup Representative team, often as a curtain raiser to a State of Origin game. The team is administered by the New South Wales Rugby League and regularly played its home matches at ANZ Stadium.

== History ==
Since 1994, the New South Wales Residents have played an annual fixture against the Queensland Residents team, currently known as the QLD Cup Representative Team. The fixture was formerly a curtain raiser to a State of Origin game but as of 2015 has been played on the annual Representative Weekend.

== Results ==
=== Results from 1994-2004 ===
Year	Winner	Score	Loser	Venue
1994	New South Wales	30–22	Queensland	Suncorp Stadium
1995	New South Wales	44–14	Queensland	Suncorp Stadium
1996	Queensland	18–10	New South Wales	Suncorp Stadium
1997	Queensland	14–4	New South Wales	Allianz Stadium
1998	Queensland	28–0	New South Wales	Allianz Stadium
1999	Queensland	26–10	New South Wales	Suncorp Stadium
2000	New South Wales	22–14	Queensland	ANZ Stadium
2001	New South Wales	19–14	Queensland	ANZ Stadium
2002	New South Wales	26–16	Queensland	ANZ Stadium

=== 2003 ===
16 July 2003

Queensland Residents	36 – 12	New South Wales Residents
Tries: 6 Scott Prince; Barry Berrigan; Danny McAllister; Michael Coorey; Damien Quinn; Matt Ross; Goals: 6 Scott Prince (6/7)		Tries: 2 Reece Simmonds; Rod Jensen; Goals: 2 Dean Byrne (2/2)

Suncorp Stadium, Brisbane

=== 2004 ===
7 July 2004

New South Wales Residents	20 – 12	Queensland Residents
Tries; Aaron Gorrell 1 Luke Dorn 1 Riley Brown 1 Trent Clayton 1 Goals; Luke Covell 2		Tries; 1 Trent Leis; 1 Nick Parfitt Goals; 2 Trent Leis

Telstra Stadium, Olympic Park, Sydney

=== 2005 ===
6 July 2005

Queensland Residents	6 – 16	New South Wales Residents
Tries; Adam Hayden 1 Goals; Damien Quinn 1	Report	Tries; 2 Grant Rovelli; 1 John Williams Goals; 2 Nathan Merritt

Suncorp Stadium, Brisbane

=== 2006 ===
5 July 2006

Queensland Residents	20 – 28	New South Wales Residents
Tries; Ryan Cullen 1 Matt Lockyer 1 Simon Phillips 1 Adam Starr 1 Goals; Brandon Costin 1 Luke Branighan 1		Tries; 1 Brad Cross; 1 Brett Finn; 1 Tevita Metuisela; 1 Joel Reddy; 1 John Williams Goals; 4 Michael Witt

Telstra Dome, Melbourne

=== 2007 ===
4 July 2007

Queensland Residents	52 – 28	New South Wales Residents
Tries; Ben Black 2 Shannon Walker 2 Jordan Atkins 1 Nick Emmett 1 Nick Parfitt 1 David Taylor 1 Chris Walker 1 Goals; Nick Parfitt 8	Report	Tries; 2 Tony Caine; 1 Stuart Flanagan; 1 Kris Keating; 1 Charlie Leaeno Goals; 3 David McLean; 1 Alan Rothery

Suncorp Stadium, Brisbane

=== 2008 ===
11 June 2008

Queensland Residents	16 – 24	New South Wales Residents
Tries; Selasi Berdie 1 Cy Lasscock 1 Kaine Manihera 1 Goals; Nick Parfitt 2	Report	Tries; 1 Brett Anderson; 1 Shaun Foley; 1 Byron Ford; 1 Ryan Tandy Goals; 4 James Maloney

Suncorp Stadium, Brisbane

=== 2009 ===
15 July 2009

Queensland Residents	34 – 6	New South Wales Residents
Tries; Mark Cantoni 1 Luke Dalziel-Don 1 Josh Hoffman 1 Ben Jeffery 1 Kaine Manihera 1 James Stuart 1 Goals; Trent Hodkinson 3 Brad Davis 2	Report	Tries; 1 James Maloney Goals; 1 James Maloney

Suncorp Stadium, Brisbane
Referee: Clayton Sharpe

=== 2010 ===
7 July 2010

New South Wales Residents	28 – 20	Queensland Residents
Tries; Aidan Guerra 1 Rory Kostjasyn 1 Sean Meaney 1 Kevin Naiqama 1 Jamie Simpson 1 Gareth Widdop 1 Goals; Sean Meaney 2	Report	Tries; 1 Daly Cherry-Evans; 1 Luke Dalziel-Don; 1 Donald Malone; 1 Daniel Ogden Goals; 2 Daly Cherry-Evans

ANZ Stadium, Sydney
Referee: Matt Hawkins

=== 2011 ===
6 July 2011

Queensland Residents	32 – 6	New South Wales Residents
Tries; Luke Capewell 2 Brad Davis 1 Kayne Lawton 1 Joel Riethmuller 1 Ryan Simpkins 1 Goals; Liam Georgetown 4		Tries; 1 Jake Mullaney Goals; 1 Tom Humble

Suncorp Stadium, Brisbane
Referee: Michael Wise

=== 2012 ===
6 July 2012

Queensland Residents	20 – 14	New South Wales Residents
Tries; Nathanael Barnes 2 Luke Capewell 1 Liam Georgetown 1 Goals; Liam Georgetown 2		Tries; 1 Josh Davis; 1 Matt Moylan; 1 Troy Savage Goals; 1 Matt Moylan

Suncorp Stadium, Brisbane
Referee: Chris Butler

=== 2013 ===
17 July 2013

New South Wales Residents	22 – 18	Queensland Residents
Tries; Jason Clark 1 Shaune Corrigan 1 Josh Mantellato 1 Sam Williams 1 Goals; Josh Mantellato 3	Report	Tries; 1 Tim Glasby; 1 Donald Malone; 1 Jarrod McInally; 1 Hezron Murgha Goals; 1 Donald Malone

ANZ Stadium, Sydney
Referee: Phil Henderson

=== 2014 ===
9 July 2014

Queensland Residents	24 – 16	New South Wales Residents
Tries; Aaron Whitchurch 2 Javid Bowen 1 Blake Leary 1 Goals; Shaun Nona 4		Tries; 2 Chanel Mata'utia; 1 Isaah Yeo Goals; 2 Nathan Stapleton

Suncorp Stadium, Brisbane
Referee: Clayton Sharpe

=== 2015 ===
3 May 2015

Queensland Residents	36 – 32	New South Wales Residents
Tries; Kalifa Faifai Loa 2 Javid Bowen 1 Kyle Feldt 1 Shaun Nona 1 Matt Parcell 1 Goals; Shaun Nona 6		Tries; 2 Mitchell Barnett; 2 Chanel Mata'utia; 1 Nathan Gardner; 1 Darren Nicholls Goals; 4 Nathan Gardner

Tapout Energy Stadium, Brisbane
Referee: Peter Gough

New South Wales Residents
2015 squad		Coaching staff
1 Nathan Gardner – FB; 2 Mitch Brown – WG; 3 Levi Dodd – CE; 4 Peter Mata’utia – CE; 5 Chanel Mata’utia – WG; 6 Darren Nicholls – FE; 7 Mitch Cornish – HB; 8 Sam Anderson – PR; 9 Mitch Williams (c) – HK; 10 Danny Fualalo – PR; 11 Will Matthews – SR; 12 Mitch Barnett – SR; 13 Adam Elliott – LK	14 Matt Hyland – HK; 15 Leilani Latu – SR; 16 Mark Nicholls – LK; 17 Nathan Green – PR; 18 Daniel Alvaro – PR; 19 Nathan Ross – PR	Head coach: Coach: Garth Brennan (Penrith) Assistant Coach: Brett Cook (Wentworthville) Manager: Brett McKenna (Wests Tigers); Legend: (c) Captain(s); (vc) Vice-captain(s)

=== 2016 ===
8 May 2016

Queensland Residents	16 – 30	New South Wales Residents
Tries; Jahrome Hughes 1 Darren Nicholls 1 Jack Svendsen 1 Goals; Darren Nicholls 2		Tries; 3 Ken Maumalo; 1 Josh Drinkwater; 1 Asipeli Fine; 1 Dylan Kelly Goals; 3 Shaun Nona

Suzuki Stadium, Brisbane
Referee: Matt Noyen

New South Wales Residents
2016 squad		Coaching staff
1 Justin Hunt – FB; 2 Bureta Faraimo – WG; 3 Jordan Drew – CE; 4 Matthew Allwood – CE; 5 Ken Maumalo – WG; 6 Shaun Nona – FE; 7 Josh Drinkwater – HB; 8 Abraham Papali'i – PR; 9 Mitch Williams (c) – HK; 10 Daniel Alvaro – PR; 11 Asipeli Fine – SR; 12 Mitch Barnett – SR; 13 Elijah Taylor – LK	14 Zach Dockar-Clay – HK; 15 Shaun Lane – SR; 16 Shannon Wakeman – LK; 17 Dylan Kelly – PR	Legend: (c) Captain(s); (vc) Vice-captain(s); Updated: 8 September 2018; Source(s): NSWRL

=== 2017 ===
7 May 2017

Queensland Residents	36 – 6	New South Wales Residents
Tries; Delouise Hoeter 2 Dean Britt 1 Mitchell Frei 1 Tom Opacic 1 Billy Walters 1 Goals; Scott Doyle 6		Tries; 1 Moses Leota Goals; 1 Jayden Nikorima

Suzuki Stadium, Brisbane

New South Wales Residents
2017 squad		Coaching staff
1 Dylan Edwards – FB; 2 Chris Centrone – WG; 3 Jordan Drew – CE; 4 Matt Allwood – CE; 5 Bureta Faraimo – WG; 6 Jayden Nikorima – FE; 7 Mitch Cornish (c) – HB; 8 Andy Saunders – PR; 9 Mitch Rein – HK; 10 Moses Leota – PR; 11 Jack Williams – SR; 12 Asipeli Fine – SR; 13 Cheyne Whitelaw – LK	14 Tyrone May – HK; 15 Tautalatasi Tasi – SR; 16 Lindsay Collins – LK; 17 Toafofoa Sipley – PR; 18 Josh King – PR; 19 Nick Meaney – PR	Head coach: Coach: Rip Taylor (Wyong Roos) Assistant Coach: Steve Georgallis (Canterbury Bulldogs); Legend: (c) Captain(s); (vc) Vice-captain(s); Updated: 9 September 2018; Source(s): QRL

=== 2018 ===
24 June 2018

New South Wales Residents	36 – 20	Queensland Residents
Tries: Dean Britt (18', 21') 2 Kyle Flanagan (5') 1 Luke Garner (26') 1 Sean O'Sullivan (35') 1 Tony Satini (52') 1 Goals: Kyle Flanagan 6/6 (7', 19', 23', 28', 37', 54')	1st: 30 – 0; 2nd: 6 – 20	Tries: 2 (43', 78') Kalifa Faifai Loa; 1 (73') Blake Leary; 1 (75') Scott Drinkwater; Goals: 2/3 Kalifa Faifai Loa (74', 76'); 0/1 Jonus Pearson (15')

ANZ Stadium, Sydney

New South Wales Residents
2018 squad		Coaching staff
1 Caleb Aekins – FB; 2 Tony Satini – WG; 3 Aaron Gray – CE; 4 Mawene Hiroti – CE; 5 Maika Sivo – WG; 6 Sean O’Sullivan – FE; 7 Kyle Flanagan (c) – HB; 8 Kurt Dillon – PR; 9 Blayke Brailey – HK; 10 JJ Felise – PR; 16 Dean Britt – SR; 12 Luke Garner – SR; 13 Liam Martin – LK	14 Suaia Matagi – HK; 15 Ofahiki Ogden – SR; 16 Billy Brittain – LK; 19 Bayley Sironen – PR	Head coach: Coach: Shane Millard (North Sydney) Assistant Coach: Guy Missio (Penrith); Legend: (c) Captain(s); (vc) Vice-captain(s); Updated: 9 September 2018; Source(s): NSWRL

=== 2019 ===
12 May 2019

Queensland Residents	42 – 22	New South Wales Residents
Tries: Delouise Hoeter (7', 18', 58') 2 Sam Scarlett (21') 1 Temone Power (30') 1 Josh Cleeland (53') 1 Corey Jensen (77') 1 Goals: Josh Cleeland 7/8 (9', 23', 32', 55', 59', 70', 78')	1st: 22 – 6; 2nd: 20 – 16	Tries: 1 (40') Beau Fermor; 1 (43') Brian To'o; 1 (49') Dean Britt; 1 (74') Keaon Koloamatangi; Goals: 2/3 Brock Lamb (40', 74'); 1/1 Morgan Harper (50')

Dolphin Stadium, Redcliffe

== See also ==
- New South Wales State team
- New South Wales Women's team
- New South Wales Under-20 team
- New South Wales Under-18 team
- New South Wales Under-16 team
- Intrust Super Premiership
- New South Wales Rugby League
- Country Rugby League
