= 2018 Queensland Cup =

- Duration: March 10 – September 23, 2018
- Teams: 14
- Premiers: Redcliffe Dolphins (6th title)
- Minor premiers: Redcliffe Dolphins (6th title)
- Matches played: 167
- Points scored: 7,279
- Top points scorer: Guy Hamilton (176)
- Player of the year: Nathaniel Neale (Petero Civoniceva Medal)
- Top try-scorer(s): Daniel Ogden; Michael Purcell (22)

The 2018 Queensland Cup season was the 23rd season of the top-level statewide rugby league competition in Queensland, Australia, run by the Queensland Rugby League. The competition, known as the Intrust Super Cup due to sponsorship from Intrust Super, featured 14 teams playing a 28-week long season (including finals) from March to September.

The Redcliffe Dolphins won their sixth premiership after defeating the Easts Tigers 32–22 in the Grand Final at Suncorp Stadium. Ipswich Jets prop Nathaniel Neale was named the competition's Player of the Year, winning the Petero Civoniceva Medal.

== Teams ==
In 2018, the lineup of teams remained unchanged for the fourth consecutive year.

Colours	Club	Home ground(s)	Head coach(s)	Captain(s)	NRL Affiliate
	Burleigh Bears	Pizzey Park	Jim Lenihan	Luke Page	Gold Coast Titans
	Central Queensland Capras	Browne Park	Kim Williams	Jack Madden	None
	Easts Tigers	Suzuki Stadium	Scott Sipple	Jake Foster	Melbourne Storm
	Ipswich Jets	North Ipswich Reserve	Ben & Shane Walker	Nathaniel Neale	None
	Mackay Cutters	BB Print Stadium	Steve Sheppard	Tom Murphy	North Queensland Cowboys
	Northern Pride	Barlow Park	Ty Williams	Ryan Ghietti	North Queensland Cowboys
	Norths Devils	Bishop Park	Rohan Smith	John Palavi	Brisbane Broncos
	Papua New Guinea Hunters	National Football Stadium	Michael Marum	Ase Boas	None
	Redcliffe Dolphins	Dolphin Oval	Adam Mogg	Cameron Cullen	Brisbane Broncos
	Souths Logan Magpies	Davies Park	Jon Buchanan	Phil Dennis	Brisbane Broncos
	Sunshine Coast Falcons	Sunshine Coast Stadium	Craig Ingebrigtsen	Dane Hogan	Melbourne Storm
	Townsville Blackhawks	Jack Manski Oval	Kristian Woolf	Andrew Niemoeller	North Queensland Cowboys
	Tweed Heads Seagulls	Piggabeen Sports Complex	Ben Woolf	Sam Meskell	Gold Coast Titans
	Wynnum Manly Seagulls	BMD Kougari Oval	Adam Brideson	Mitch Cronin	Brisbane Broncos

== Ladder ==
2018 Queensland Cup
Pos	Team	Pld	W	D	L	B	PF	PA	PD	Pts
1	Redcliffe Dolphins (P)	23	16	1	6	1	600	382	+218	35
2	Burleigh Bears	23	16	0	7	1	589	427	+162	34
3	Townsville Blackhawks	23	15	0	8	1	571	348	+223	32
4	Northern Pride	23	13	1	9	1	474	404	+70	29
5	Easts Tigers	23	13	0	10	1	576	503	+73	28
6	Ipswich Jets	23	13	0	10	1	554	505	+49	28
7	Papua New Guinea Hunters	23	13	0	10	1	444	418	+26	28
8	Norths Devils	23	11	0	12	1	516	553	-37	24
9	Souths Logan Magpies	23	10	0	13	1	534	499	+35	22
10	Sunshine Coast Falcons	23	10	0	13	1	453	464	-11	22
11	Tweed Heads Seagulls	23	9	1	13	1	435	634	-199	21
12	Wynnum Manly Seagulls	23	9	0	14	1	472	593	-121	20
13	Central Queensland Capras	23	7	0	16	1	390	576	-186	16
14	Mackay Cutters	23	4	1	18	1	386	688	-302	11

== Final series ==
Home	Score	Away	Match Information
Home	Score	Away	Date and Time (Local)	Venue
Elimination Finals
Townsville Blackhawks	12 - 32	Ipswich Jets	1 September 2018, 1:10pm	Jack Manski Oval
Northern Pride	0 – 32	Easts Tigers	1 September 2018, 3:00pm	Stan Williams Park
Major / Minor Semi-finals
Easts Tigers	50 – 20	Ipswich Jets	8 September 2018, 1:10pm	Suzuki Stadium
Redcliffe Dolphins	13 – 6	Burleigh Bears	8 September 2018, 6:00pm	Dolphin Stadium
Preliminary Finals
Burleigh Bears	26 – 36	Easts Tigers	15 September 2018, 1:10pm	Pizzey Park
Grand Final
Redcliffe Dolphins	36 – 22	Easts Tigers	23 September 2018, 3:10pm	Suncorp Stadium

Elimination Finals
4	Northern Pride	0
5	Easts	32
3	Townsville	12
6	Ipswich	32

Major / Minor Semi-finals
1	Redcliffe	13
2	Burleigh	6
5	Easts	50
6	Ipswich	20

Preliminary final
2	Burleigh	26
5	Easts	36

Grand Final
1	Redcliffe	36
5	Easts	22

== Grand Final ==
2018 Intrust Super Cup Grand Final

Sunday, September 23
3:00pm AEST (UTC+10)

Redcliffe Dolphins	36–22	Easts Tigers
Tries: 6 Fuller 17', 42'; Hawkins 27'; Staggs 46'; Watts 62'; Opacic 78'; Goals: 6 Staggs pen 10', 28', pen 33', 43', 48', 63' (6/9)	1st: 14–10; 2nd: 22–12; Report	Tries: 4 Carey 12'; Seve 37'; Foster 56'; Drinkwater 64'; Goals: 3 Torpy 13', 57', 65' (3/4)

Suncorp Stadium
Attendance: 7,504
Player of the Match: Toby Rudolf (Redcliffe)

Team details
Redcliffe Dolphins		Position	Easts Tigers
Name	Number	Position	Number	Name
Trai Fuller	1	Fullback	1	Scott Drinkwater
Josh Beehag	2	Wing	2	Linc Port
Kotoni Staggs	3	Centre	3	Shane Neumann
Tom Opacic	4	Centre	4	Marion Seve
Jeremy Hawkins	5	Wing	5	Conor Carey
Bryce Donovan	6	Five eighth	6	Billy Walters
Cameron Cullen (c)	7	Half back	7	Brayden Torpy
Sam Anderson	10	Prop forward	8	Albert Vete
Jake Turpin	9	Hooker	9	Tom Butterfield
Nathan Watts	16	Prop forward	10	David Tyrell
Toby Rudolf	11	Second row	11	Jake Foster (c)
Myles Taueli	14	Second row	12	Patrick Kaufusi
Jamil Hopoate	13	Lock forward	13	Jack Svendsen
Nick Slyney	8	Interchange	14	Chris Ostwald
Aaron Whitchurch	12	Interchange	16	Tino Fa'asuamaleaui
James Taylor	15	Interchange	17	Kelma Tuilagi
Hugh Pratt	17	Interchange	20	Sam Kasiano
Adam Mogg		Coach		Scott Sipple
QRL match centre

Redcliffe finished the regular season as minor premiers for the sixth time and earned a bye in the first week of the finals. In the major semi final, they defeated Burleigh 13–6 and qualified for their 11th Grand Final. Easts finished fifth on the ladder and defeated the fourth-placed Northern Pride 32–0 in the first week of the finals. In the minor semi final, they eliminated Ipswich 50–20 before upsetting Burleigh in the preliminary final to qualify for their fifth Grand Final. Redcliffe and Easts last met in a Grand Final in 1997, with the Dolphins winning 18–16.

=== First half ===
Redcliffe were the first to score in the Grand Final thanks to a Kotoni Staggs penalty goal from 20 metres out. The first try of the contest went to Easts, with Conor Carey stretching out to score in the corner. Redcliffe recorded their first four-pointer in the 16th minute when a late Cameron Cullen offload found fullback Trai Fuller who muscled his way over. They scored their second when Jeremy Hawkins leapt high to catch a Bryce Donovan kick and planted it down for a try. Another penalty goal in the 33rd minute gave the Dolphins a 14–6 lead. Easts hit back in the shadow of half time when Marion Seve scored out wide to cut the margin to four points.

=== Second half ===
The Dolphins opened the second half with an early try when Fuller ducked through the Tigers' defence to score his second try. They extended their lead in the 46th minute when a Donovan grubber was kept alive by Aaron Whitchurch, who batted infield for Staggs to score. Easts got back into the game in the 56th minute when captain Jake Foster barged over from close range to score. In the 62nd minute, Redcliffe all but sealed the win when Donovan set up another try with his boot, this time finding Nathan Watt who dived on his grubber. The Tigers got one back two minutes later through fullback Scott Drinkwater but it proved to be a consolation try in the end, as Redcliffe ended the game with a try to Tom Opacic in the 78th minute. Dolphins' second rower Toby Rudolf was awarded the Duncan Hall Medal for man of the match.

=== NRL State Championship ===
After winning the Grand Final, the Redcliffe Dolphins qualified for the NRL State Championship on NRL Grand Final day. They were defeated by the Canterbury-Bankstown Bulldogs, the New South Wales Cup premiers, 18–42.

Sunday, 30 September
3:40pm (AEST)

Canterbury-Bankstown Bulldogs	42 – 18	Redcliffe Dolphins
Tries: Josh Cleeland (36', 38') 2 Rhyse Martin (6') 1 Chris Smith (47') 1 Renouf To'omaga (52') 1 Jayden Okunbor (72') 1 Fa'amanu Brown (77') 1 Goals: Rhyse Martin 5/6 (8', 37', 48', 54', 58' pen); Greg Eastwood 1/1 (74'); Josh Cleeland 1/1 (78')	1st: 16 – 6; 2nd: 26 – 12; NRL Stats	Tries: 2 (30', 60') Kotoni Staggs; 1 (74') James Taylor; Goals: 2/2 Bryce Donovan (61', 75'); 1/1 Kotoni Staggs (31')

ANZ Stadium, Sydney
Referee: Adam Cassidy, Liam Kennedy

Team lists:

FB	1	Mason Cerruto
WG	2	Josh Bergamin
CE	3	Morgan Harper
CE	4	John Olive
WG	5	Jayden Okunbor
FE	6	Josh Cleeland
HB	7	Fa'amanu Brown
PR	8	Renouf To'omaga
HK	9	Zac Woolford
PR	10	Francis Tualau
SR	11	Ofahiki Ogden
SR	12	Rhyse Martin (c)
LK	13	Greg Eastwood
Substitutes:
IC	14	Bronson Garlick
IC	14	Lachlan Burr
IC	16	Jack Nelson
IC	17	Chris Smith
Coach:
Steve Georgallis

FB	1	Trai Fuller
WG	2	Josh Beehag
CE	3	Kotoni Staggs
CE	4	Tom Opacic
WG	5	Jeremy Hawkins
FE	6	Bryce Donovan
HB	7	Cameron Cullen (c)
PR	16	Nathan Watts
HK	9	Jake Turpin
PR	10	Sam Anderson
SR	14	Miles Taueli
SR	11	Toby Rudolf
LK	13	Jamil Hopoate
Substitutes:
IC	8	Nick Slyney
IC	12	Aaron Whitchurch
IC	15	James Taylor
IC	17	Hugh Pratt
Coach:
Adam Mogg

== Player statistics ==
=== Leading try scorers ===
Pos	Player	Team	Tries
1	Michael Purcell	Ipswich Jets	22
2	Daniel Ogden	Wynnum Manly Seagulls	19
3	Scott Drinkwater	Easts Tigers	17
4	Linc Port	Easts Tigers	16
4	Marion Seve	Easts Tigers	16
4	Kalifa Faifai Loa	Townsville Blackhawks	16
7	Jaelen Feeney	Townsville Blackhawks	15
8	Jonus Pearson	Redcliffe Dolphins	14
8	Jarrod McInally	Easts Tigers	14
8	Troy Leo	Burleigh Bears	14

=== Leading point scorers ===
Pos	Player	Team	T	G	FG	Pts
1	Kotoni Staggs	Redcliffe Dolphins	13	63	-	178
2	Guy Hamilton	Souths Logan Magpies	5	78	-	176
3	Wes Conlon	Ipswich Jets	11	53	-	150
4	Jake Clifford	Northern Pride	10	46	2	134
5	Marmin Barba	Ipswich Jets	10	44	0	128
6	Brayden Torphy	Easts Tigers	6	50	0	124
6	Ase Boas	Papua New Guinea Hunters	7	48	0	124
8	Cameron Broadhurst	Central Queensland Capras	4	50	0	116
9	Todd Murphy	Norths Devils	4	47	0	110
10	Jamal Fogarty	Burleigh Bears	5	42	0	104

== QRL awards ==
- Petero Civoniceva Medal (Best and Fairest): Nathaniel Neale ( Ipswich Jets)
- Coach of the Year: Ty Williams ( Northern Pride)
- Rookie of the Year: Jake Clifford ( Northern Pride)
- Representative Player of the Year: David Fifita ( Queensland under-18, Souths Logan Magpies)

=== Team of the Year ===
Position	Nat	Winner	Club
Fullback	(Australia)	Scott Drinkwater	Easts Tigers
Wing	(New Zealand)	Kalifa Faifai Loa	Townsville Blackhawks
Centre	(Australia)	Kotoni Staggs	Redcliffe Dolphins
Five-eighth	(Australia)	Billy Walters	Easts Tigers
Halfback	(Australia)	Jake Clifford	Northern Pride
Prop	(New Zealand)	Nathaniel Neale	Ipswich Jets
Hooker	(Tonga)	Pat Politoni	Burleigh Bears
Second-row	(Australia)	Patrick Kaufusi	Easts Tigers
Lock	(Australia)	Jamil Hopoate	Redcliffe Dolphins

== See also ==
- Queensland Cup
- Queensland Rugby League
