= Kurt Capewell =

Australian rugby league footballer

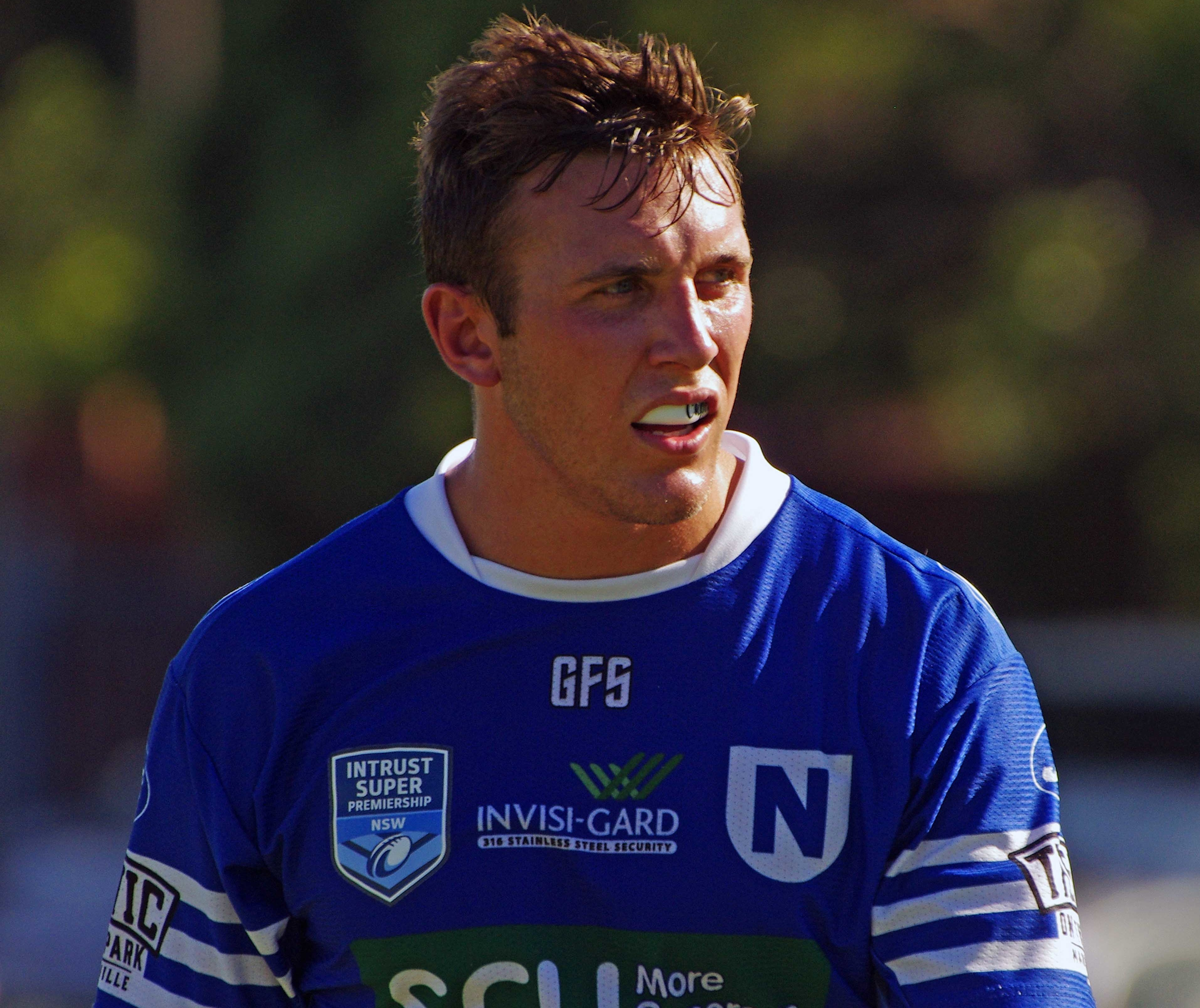

Personal information
- Born: 12 July 1993 (age 33) Charleville, Queensland, Australia
- Height: 189 cm (6 ft 2 1/2 in)
- Weight: 100 kg (15 st 10 lb)

Playing information
- Position: Second-row, Centre
Club
Years	Team	Pld	T	G	FG	P
2016–19	Cronulla Sharks	64	6	0	0	24
2020–21	Penrith Panthers	32	10	0	0	40
2022–23	Brisbane Broncos	43	11	0	1	45
2024–	New Zealand Warriors	55	8	0	0	32
	Total	194	35	0	1	141
Representative
Years	Team	Pld	T	G	FG	P
2020–26	Queensland	16	3	0	0	12
- Source: As of 6 November 2026
- Relatives: Luke Capewell (cousin)

Kurt Capewell (born 12 July 1993) is an Australian professional rugby league footballer who plays as a second-row forward for the New Zealand Warriors in the National Rugby League (NRL).

He previously played for the Brisbane Broncos, the Penrith Panthers and the Cronulla-Sutherland Sharks in the NRL. Capewell was part of Penrith's 2021 premiership-winning squad. At state representative level, he has played for Queensland in the State of Origin series.

== Background ==
Capewell was born in Charleville, Queensland, and is a cousin of former NRL player Luke Capewell.

Capewell played junior rugby league for Charleville and the Norths Ipswich Tigers. After playing some rugby union and being chosen to train with the Ipswich Jets in the Queensland Cup, he was signed by the Brisbane Broncos for their National Youth Competition (rugby league) (NYC) team.

== Playing career ==
=== Early career ===
Capewell played for the Brisbane Broncos' NYC team in 2012 and 2013, as well as the Sydney Roosters' NYC team in 2013.

He subsequently played for the Ipswich Jets in Queensland, and was part of their squads in the 2015 Queensland Cup Grand Final win over the Townsville Blackhawks and their 2015 NRL State Championship win over New South Wales Cup premiers Newcastle Knights.

=== Cronulla-Sutherland Sharks (2016–2019) ===
Capewell commenced a one-year contract with the Cronulla-Sutherland Sharks in 2016. In Round 18 of the 2016 NRL season, Capewell made his NRL debut for Cronulla against the Penrith Panthers. In September 2016, he was named on the interchange bench in the 2016 Intrust Super Premiership NSW Team of the Year.

Capewell made his first appearance of the 2017 NRL season in round 2 against the Canberra Raiders, playing at centre in Cronulla's 42–16 victory. Capewell made nineteen appearances for Cronulla in the 2018 NRL season as the club finished fourth on the table. Capewell played in Cronulla's preliminary final defeat against Melbourne at AAMI Park. Capewell made twenty-five appearances for Cronulla in the 2019 NRL season as the club finished seventh on the table and qualified for the finals. Capewell played from the bench in Cronulla's elimination final defeat against Manly at Brookvale Oval.

=== Penrith Panthers (2020–2021) ===
Capewell signed a two-year deal with the Penrith Panthers starting in the 2020 NRL season. He missed the first two games of the 2020 season with a quad injury before returning from injury and debuting for the Penrith Panthers after the Covid shutdown in round 3 against the Newcastle Knights scoring a try in a 14–14 draw. In round 5, Capewell injured his MCL in the first minute of the game against the Parramatta Eels, in a 16–10 loss missing twelve weeks. He returned in the round 17 game against the Brisbane Broncos scoring a try in the 25–12 win. Capewell played off the interchange bench in the 2020 NRL Grand Final in Penrith's 26–20 loss against Melbourne. On 4 November, Capewell made his Origin debut for Queensland debuting in the centres.

In round 3 of the 2021 NRL season against Melbourne in the grand final rematch, he scored the match winning try in a 12–10 victory. On 1 July, Capewell signed a three-year deal with Brisbane. On 3 October Capewell played his last game for Penrith in their 14–12 Grand final victory over South Sydney.

=== Brisbane Broncos (2022–2023) ===
Capewell made his Brisbane debut in Round 1, acting as captain in the absence of Adam Reynolds. He kicked the match-sealing field goal in the 11–4 upset over South Sydney at Suncorp Stadium. Capewell made a total of nineteen appearances for Brisbane in the 2022 season scoring five tries. Brisbane finished the year in ninth place and missed the finals.

Capewell played twenty-four games for Brisbane in the 2023 NRL season. His final game for Brisbane was in their 24–26 grand final loss to the Penrith Panthers.

=== New Zealand Warriors (2024–present) ===
On 7 December 2023, Capewell signed a three-year contract to join the New Zealand Warriors immediately. Capewell played 18 games for the New Zealand Warriors in the 2024 NRL season which saw the club finish 13th on the table.

After being omitted for Game 1 of the 2025 State of Origin series, Capewell was recalled for Game 2. Capewell played 22 games with New Zealand in the 2025 NRL season as the club finished 6th on the table and qualified for the finals. They were eliminated by Penrith in the first week of the finals.

On 15 July 2026, the New Zealand Warriors announced that Capewell had re-signed with the club for a further year. Capewell played 15 games for the club in 2026 as the club finished second on the table.

== Statistics ==
Year	Team	Games	Tries	FGs	Pts
2016	Cronulla-Sutherland Sharks	4			
2017	Cronulla-Sutherland Sharks	16	4		16
2018	Cronulla-Sutherland Sharks	19	1		4
2019	Cronulla-Sutherland Sharks	25	1		4
2020	Penrith Panthers	9	4		16
2021	Penrith Panthers	23	6		24
2022	Brisbane Broncos	19	5	1	21
2023	Brisbane Broncos	24	6		20
2024	New Zealand Warriors	18	4		16
2025	New Zealand Warriors	22	2		8
2026	New Zealand Warriors	6	2		8
	Totals	185	35	1	141

== Personal life ==
In December 2020, Capewell revealed that several years earlier, he had been involved in a pornographic film with another man where he performed a sexual act. Capewell, who at the time was twenty years old and playing for the Ipswich Jets, was taking part in a photo-shoot for a sports clothing and underwear company before it turned to nude photos then an adult movie. Capewell reflected on the incident saying "The organiser used inducements and extra money for being involved in the adult film. I take full responsibility for what happened".
