= Bradley Cross =

Bradley Cross may refer to:

- Bradley Cross, Somerset, a hamlet in the parish of Cheddar, Somerset
- Bradley Cross (soccer), South African footballer

== See also ==
- Brad Cross (born 1985), Australian rugby league footballer
