= Mitchell Frei =

Australian rugby league footballer

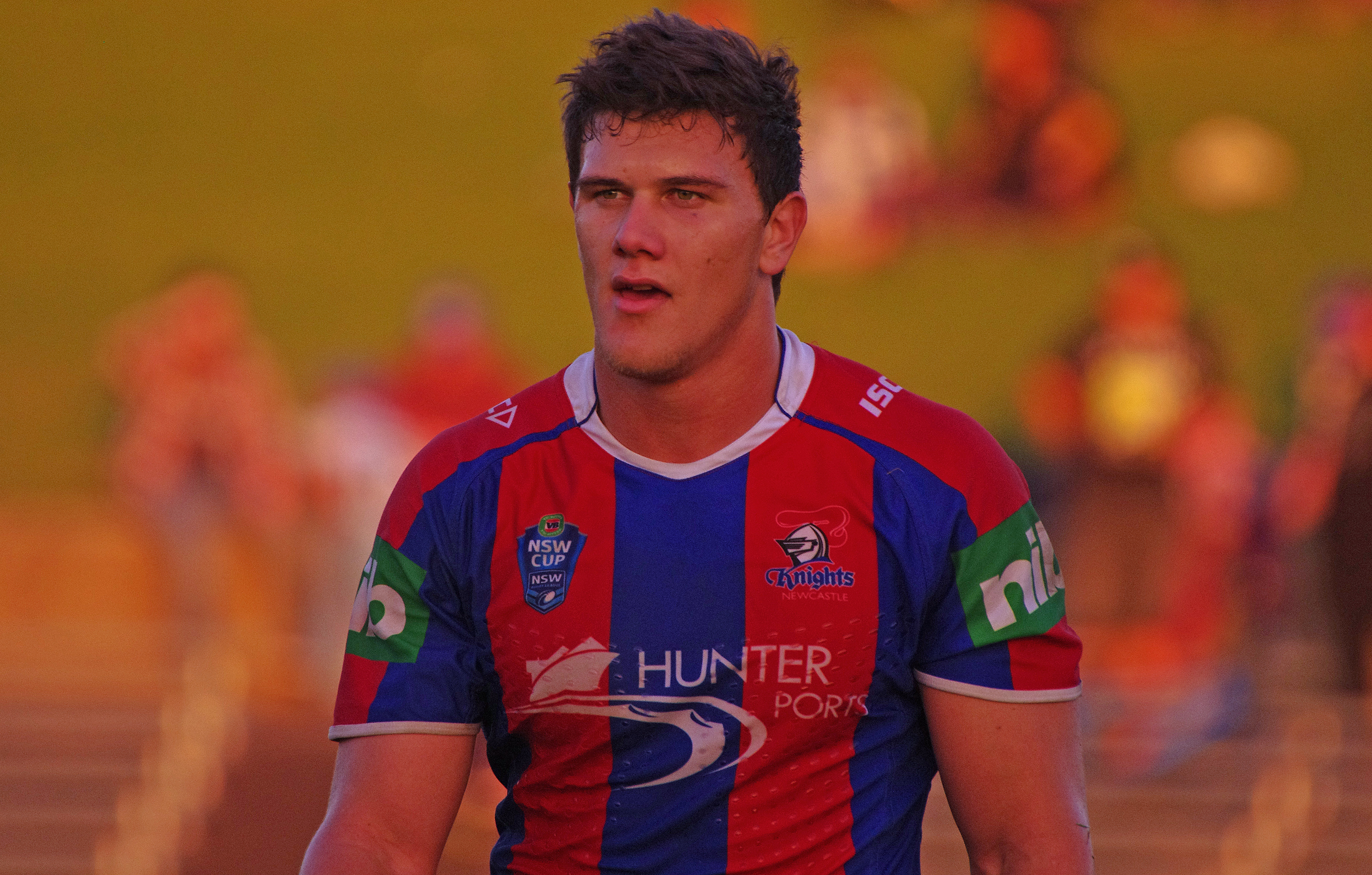
- Frei playing for the Newcastle Knights in the NSW Cup in 2013.

Personal information
- Born: 9 February 1992 (age 34) Brisbane, Queensland, Australia
- Height: 191 cm (6 ft 3 in)
- Weight: 108 kg (17 st 0 lb)

Playing information
- Position: Prop, Second-row, Lock
Club
Years	Team	Pld	T	G	FG	P
2016	Sydney Roosters	7	0	0	0	0
Representative
Years	Team	Pld	T	G	FG	P
2014–17	Queensland Residents	3	1	0	0	4
- Source: As of 7 January 2024

Mitchell Frei (born 9 February 1992) is a former Australian professional rugby league footballer who most recently played for the Brisbane Tigers in the Intrust Super Cup. Frei had also played for the Sydney Roosters in the National Rugby League, the Wynnum Manly Seagulls, the Souths Logan Magpies and Wyong Roos. He plays at second-row and lock.

== Background ==
Born in Brisbane, Queensland, Frei is of German and South African descent and played his junior rugby league for the Albany Creek Crushers, before being signed by the Brisbane Broncos.

Frei is the son of Australian former cricketer Harry Frei, his younger brothers Brendan and Jackson are also rugby league players.

== Playing career ==
=== Early career ===
From 2010 to 2012, Frei played for the Brisbane Broncos' NYC team.

On 21 April 2012, he played for the Queensland under-20s team against the New South Wales under-20s team.

On 13 November 2012, he signed a 1-year contract with the Newcastle Knights starting in 2013.

After playing in the New South Wales Cup and failing to play a first-grade game for the Knights, he joined the Wynnum Manly Seagulls in the Queensland Cup in 2014.

On 9 July 2014, he played for the Queensland Residents against the New South Wales Residents. On 3 May 2015, he again played for the Queensland Residents against the New South Wales Residents.

In May 2015, he signed a 1-year contract with the Sydney Roosters starting in 2016. On 11 September 2015, he was named the Queensland Cup Lock of the Year.

=== 2016 ===
In Round 3 of the 2016 NRL season, Frei made his NRL debut for the Roosters against the North Queensland Cowboys, coming off the interchange bench in the Roosters' 0-40 loss at 1300SMILES Stadium. At years end he left the Roosters to join Wynnum-Manly Seagulls in the Queensland Cup.

=== 2017 ===
Frei returned to the Wynnum Manly Seagulls in 2017, after not being re-signed by the Roosters. Frei remained with Wynnum Manly until the conclusion of the 2018 season, playing a total of 43 games across two seasons.

=== 2019 ===
In 2019, Frei signed with the Souths Logan Magpies in the Queensland Cup, playing 24 games across 2019 and 2020.

=== 2021 ===
Frei made the move to the Brisbane Tigers for the 2021 season, playing 21 games and scoring 5 tries for the year, marking the last season in his Rugby League career.
