= Pele Peletelese =

New Zealand rugby league footballer

Personal information
- Full name: Pele Peletelese
- Born: 22 October 1984 (age 40); Auckland, New Zealand

Playing information
- Position: Prop
Club
Years	Team	Pld	T	G	FG	P
2010	Parramatta Eels	1	0	0	0	0
Representative
Years	Team	Pld	T	G	FG	P
2014	Queensland Residents	1	0	0	0	0
- Source: As of 6 January 2024

Pele Peletelese (/pɛleɪ pɛlɛtəlɛseɪ/) (born 22 October 1984) is a New Zealand former professional rugby league footballer who played as a prop for the Parramatta Eels in the NRL in 2010.

== Playing career ==
Peletelese played for the Burleigh Bears in the Queensland Cup in 2007 and 2008 before signing with Parramatta Eels in 2009 season. He made his lone first grade appearance from the bench in his sides' 35−6 loss to the New Zealand Warriors at Mount Smart Stadium in round 17 of the 2010 season. He was released by the club at the end of the 2012 season and subsequently retired from playing rugby league.
