= Brad Cross =

Australian rugby league footballer

Personal information
- Born: 2 October 1985 (age 39); Dubbo, New South Wales, Australia

Playing information
- Position: Centre, Five-eighth
Club
Years	Team	Pld	T	G	FG	P
2007	Canberra Raiders	3	2	0	0	8
Representative
Years	Team	Pld	T	G	FG	P
2006	NSW Residents	1	1	0	0	4
2010	Queensland Residents	1	0	0	0	0
- Source: NRL Stats, As of 8 January 2024

Brad Cross (born 2 October 1985) is an Australian former professional rugby league footballer who played for the Canberra Raiders in the NRL competition.

== Playing career ==
Cross played three matches for Canberra in the 2007 season of National Rugby League. He scored two tries in his three matches. He main position was centre. He played with the Souths Logan Magpies in the Queensland Cup.
