= Sam Anderson (rugby league) =

Australian rugby league footballer (born 1991)

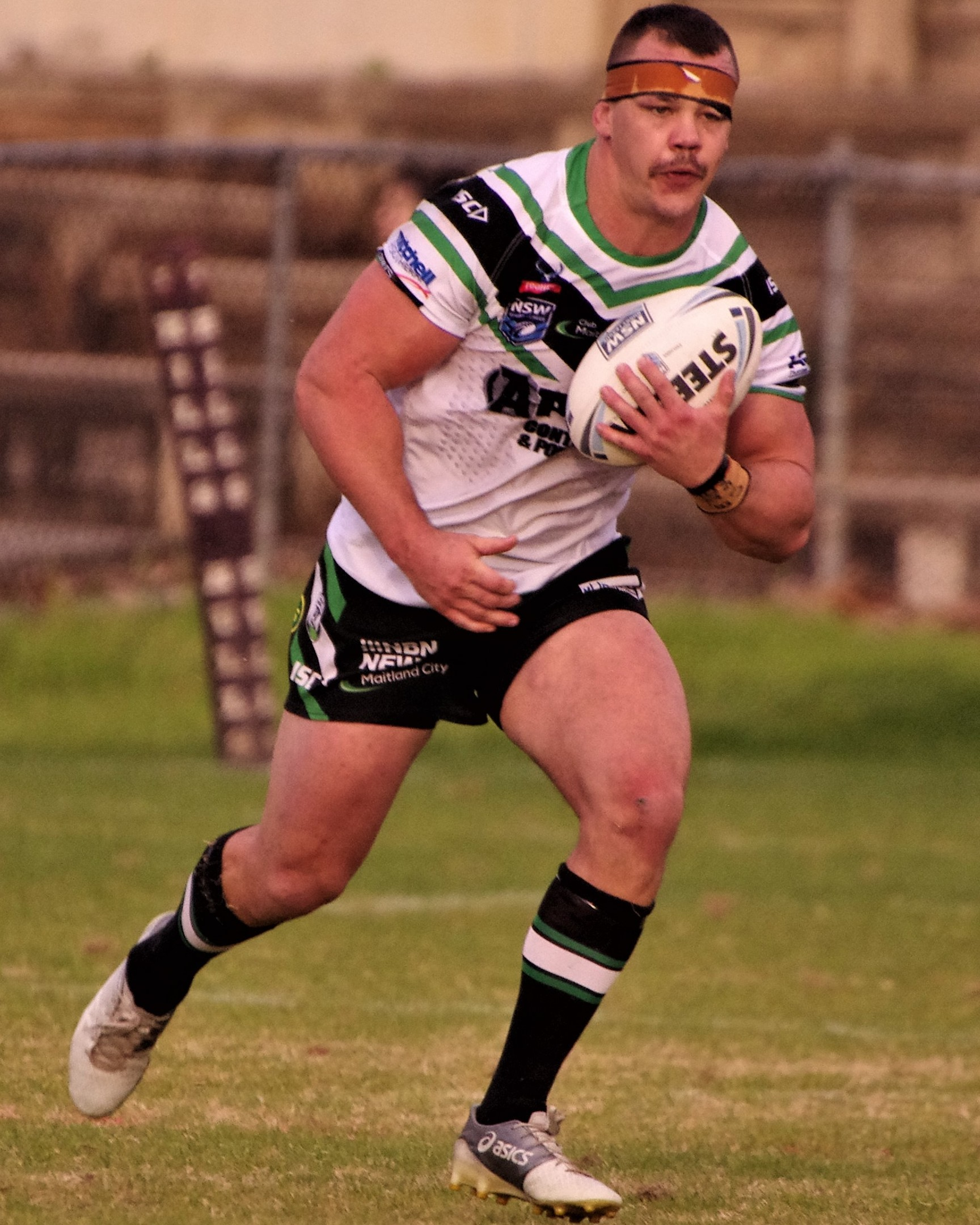

Personal information
- Born: 25 March 1991 (age 35) Newcastle, New South Wales, Australia
- Height: 181 cm (5 ft 11 in)
- Weight: 100 kg (15 st 10 lb)

Playing information
- Position: Prop, Lock
Club
Years	Team	Pld	T	G	FG	P
2013–15	Penrith Panthers	7	0	0	0	0
Representative
Years	Team	Pld	T	G	FG	P
2015	NSW Residents	1	0	0	0	0
2016–18	Queensland Residents	3	0	0	0	0
- Source: As of 9 January 2024

Sam Anderson (born 25 March 1991) is an Australian professional rugby league footballer who currently plays for the Redcliffe Dolphins in the Queensland Cup. He plays at prop and lock and previously played for the Penrith Panthers in the National Rugby League.

== Playing career ==
Born in Newcastle, New South Wales, Anderson played his junior football for the West Maitland Wallaroos and Kurri Kurri Bulldogs before being signed by the Newcastle Knights. He played for Newcastle NYC team in 2011. At the end of the 2011 season, Anderson was named the Newcastle club's NYC Player of the Year and the Players' Player of the Year.

In October 2011, Anderson was forced to decide on whether to sign with the Penrith Panthers or re-sign with Newcastle. Phil Gould, the coaching director of the Panthers, offered an easier path to first-grade football with the loss of prop Petero Civoniceva. However, Wayne Bennett, the coach of the Newcastle club, personally told Anderson that he was in his future plans for Newcastle.

On 21 October 2011, Anderson re-signed with Newcastle on a one-year contract.

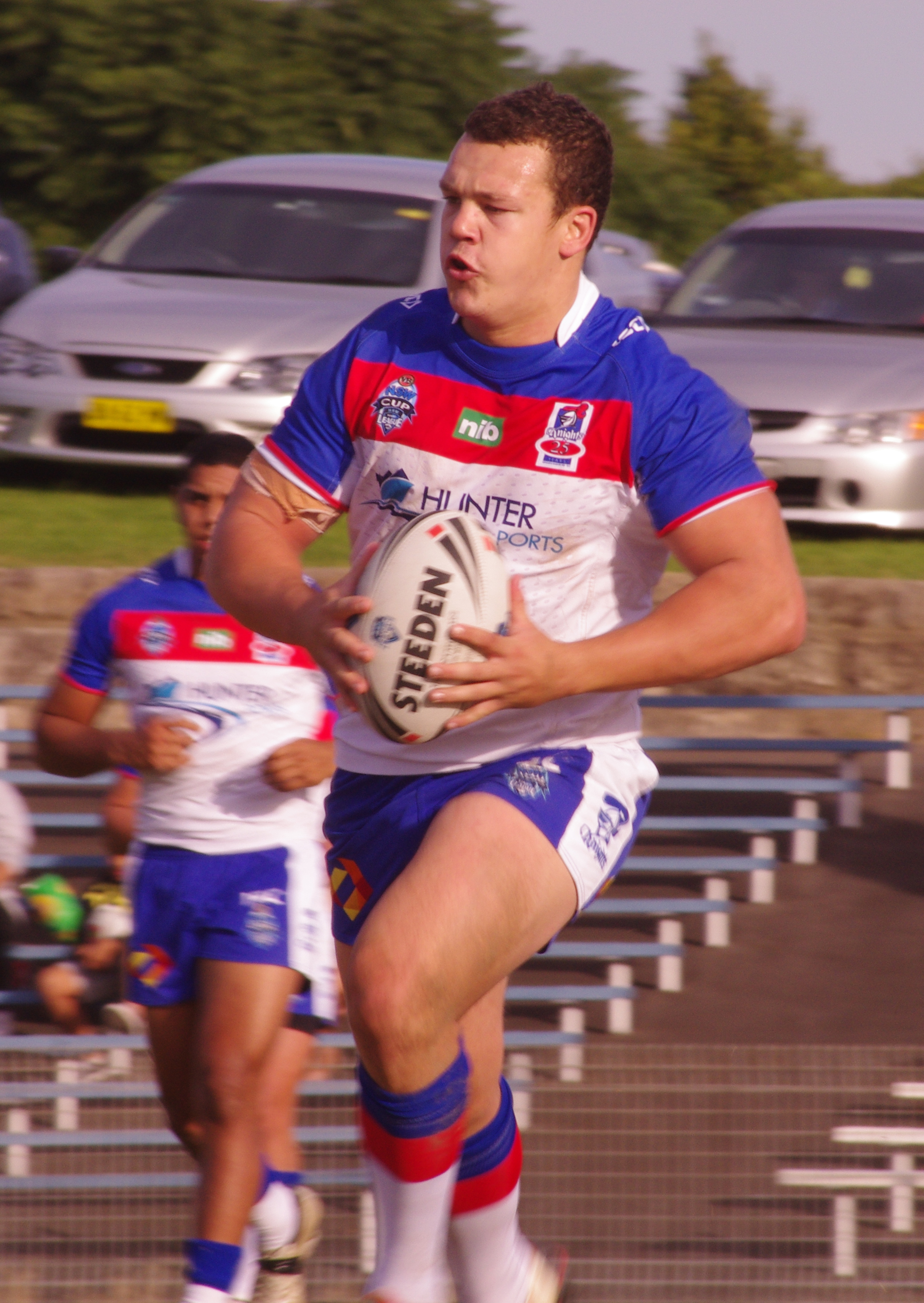
Anderson playing for the Knights in 2012

In September 2012, Anderson signed a one-year contract with the Penrith Panthers starting in 2013 after failing to make first-grade with Newcastle in 2012.

In Round 9 of the 2013 NRL season, Anderson made his NRL debut for the Penrith club against the Melbourne Storm.

On 17 July 2013, Anderson played for the New South Wales Residents against the Queensland Residents.

On 22 September 2013, Anderson was named on the interchange bench in the 2013 New South Wales Cup Team of the Year. In October he was also named as Penrith's New South Wales Cup Player of the Year, so capped off a very successful 2013.

On 9 July 2014, Anderson again played for the New South Wales Residents against the Queensland Residents.

On 21 September 2014, Anderson was named on the interchange bench in the 2014 New South Wales Cup Team of the Year for the second year in a row.

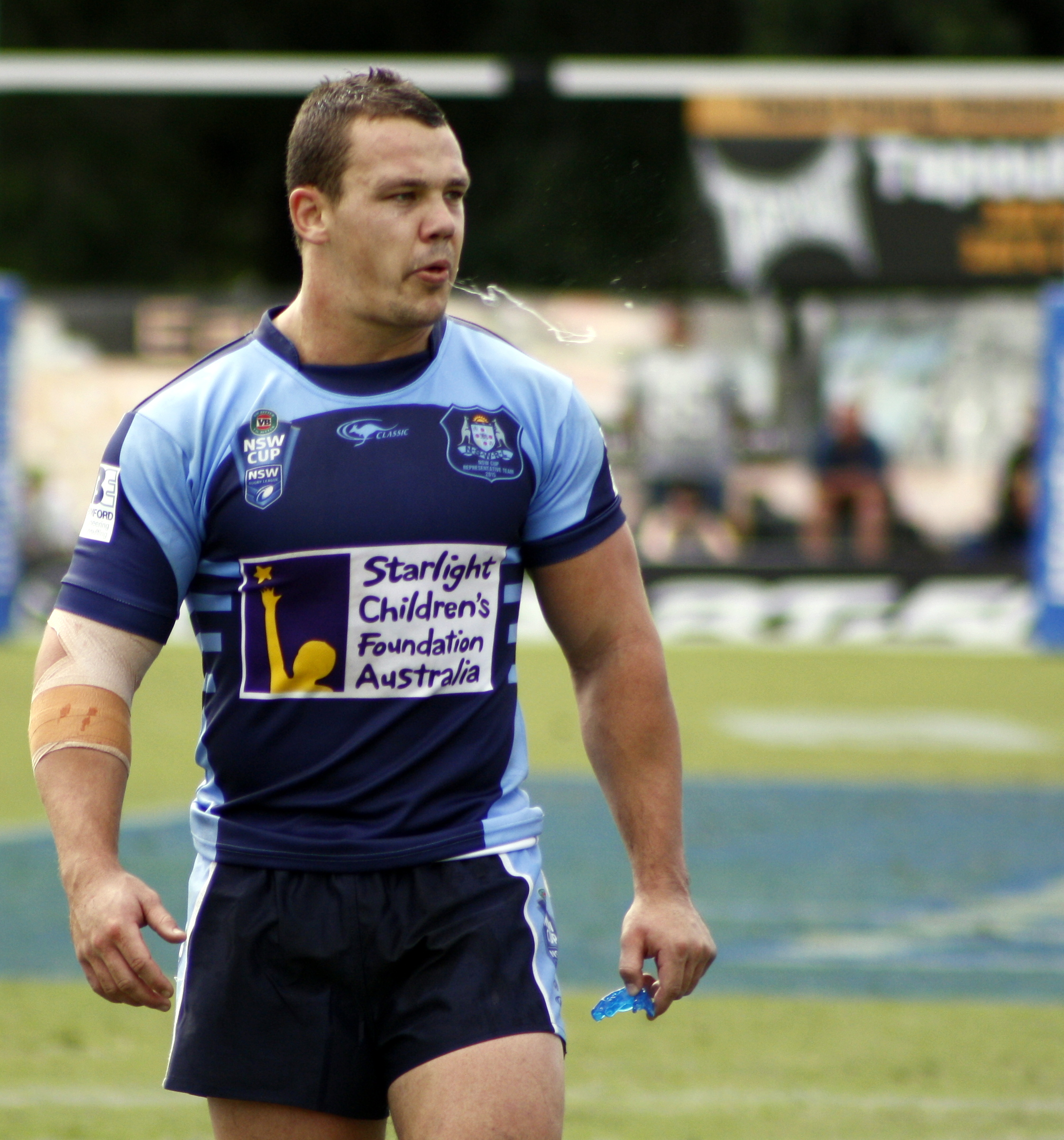
Anderson playing for the New South Wales Residents in 2015

On 3 May 2015, Anderson played for the New South Wales Residents against the Queensland Residents for the third year in a row. He added another NRL game to his tally and captained the Penrith club's New South Wales Cup team.

At the end of the 2015 season, Anderson was recruited by the Redcliffe Dolphins to play in the Queensland Cup Competition in 2016 and 2017. He was named as the team's captain for 2016.

In May 2016, Anderson was selected to represent the Queensland Residents as starting prop against New South Wales, for whom he had played the previous three seasons.

Anderson was voted 2016 Prop of the Year in the Intrust Super Cup competition and was third in the Daily Courier Player of the Year voting.

He led Redcliffe to the 2016 Minor Premiership. They were scheduled to challenge Burleigh Bears for the Major Premiership at Suncorp Stadium on 25 September 2016. Redcliffe were unsuccessful going down to Burleigh 26 to 16.

He was also awarded the Redcliffe Dolphins Player of the Year in 2016.

Anderson again had a very successful year, being selected in the Queensland Residents team which defeated NSW 36 to 6, and was again named in the Queensland Cup Team of the Year at the QRL Major Awards night, this time in his preferred position at Lock. This is his fifth year in a row, representing both States.

Redcliffe again had an excellent year, finishing second, 1 point behind Minor Premiers PNG Hunters, Sam will lead his team in the Qualifying final to be played in PNG on 10 September. Redcliffe lost 4 to 6 in PNG then were beaten the following week vs Sunshine Coast Falcons 42 to 6.

He was approached by the French 2nd Division team Toulouse and was set to join the team when it was realized that the eligibility rules for players had changed and he did not qualify.

He re-signed with Redcliffe for 2018 and again had an excellent year playing in the middle. He was chosen to represent Queensland in the State Cup representative team, going down 36 to 16 in the Curtain Raiser to State of Origin at Sydney Olympic Stadium. This made Anderson the only player to have been capped for 6 consecutive years, 3 for each state. Redcliffe went on to win the State title in 2018 vs Easts Tigers 36 to 22 but were beaten in the State Cup Championship 42 to 18 by Canterbury Bulldogs.

Anderson retired from State Cup football and returned home to Maitland where he Captained the Maitland Pickers to a finals spot in the Newcastle Rugby League competition. He had a mixed year with injury costing him 6 games but was again one of the strongest players when on the field.

He signed for another year at Maitland and hoped for more success in 2020, which he received through a successful Presidents Cup campaign, where Maitland claimed the championship against a mixture of Sydney and New South Wales country clubs. Anderson continued on with the Maitland Pickers in 2022, where he is a frequent starter at lock-forward.
