= Queensland Residents rugby league team =

Australian rugby league club

Queensland Residents
Team information
- Nickname: Maroons
- Governing body: Queensland Rugby League
- Head coach: Jon Buchanan
- Captain: Josh Cleeland
- Home stadium: Dolphin Stadium (10,000)

Uniforms
First colours

Team results
- First game
- Queensland 24–12 West Coast (Wingham Park, Greymouth; 1988)
- First Residents Game
- New South Wales 30–22 Queensland (Lang Park, Brisbane; 1994)
- Biggest win
- Queensland 76–2 Manawatu (Palmerston North Showgrounds, Palmerston North; 1990)
- Biggest defeat
- Auckland 70–12 Queensland (Carlaw Park, Auckland; 1988)

The Queensland Residents rugby league team is a representative rugby league team consisting of players who compete in the Intrust Super Cup (Queensland Cup) competition. They currently play an annual fixture against NSW Cup Representative Team, often as a curtain raiser to a State of Origin game.

The team is administered by the Queensland Rugby League and regularly played its home matches at Suncorp Stadium, until 2015, when they starting playing at Brisbane's Langlands Park (now known as Suzuki Stadium). Up until 1995, the side played against touring international sides and went on tours to countries like New Zealand and France.

A number of Queensland Residents players have gone onto play for Queensland in State of Origin, including Daly Cherry-Evans and David Taylor. As Residents selection has no bearing on Origin eligibility, a number of players have gone on to also represent New South Wales, including Trent Hodkinson and Jamie Buhrer. New Zealand internationals Jeremy Smith and Adam Blair are also former Queensland Residents representatives.

== History ==
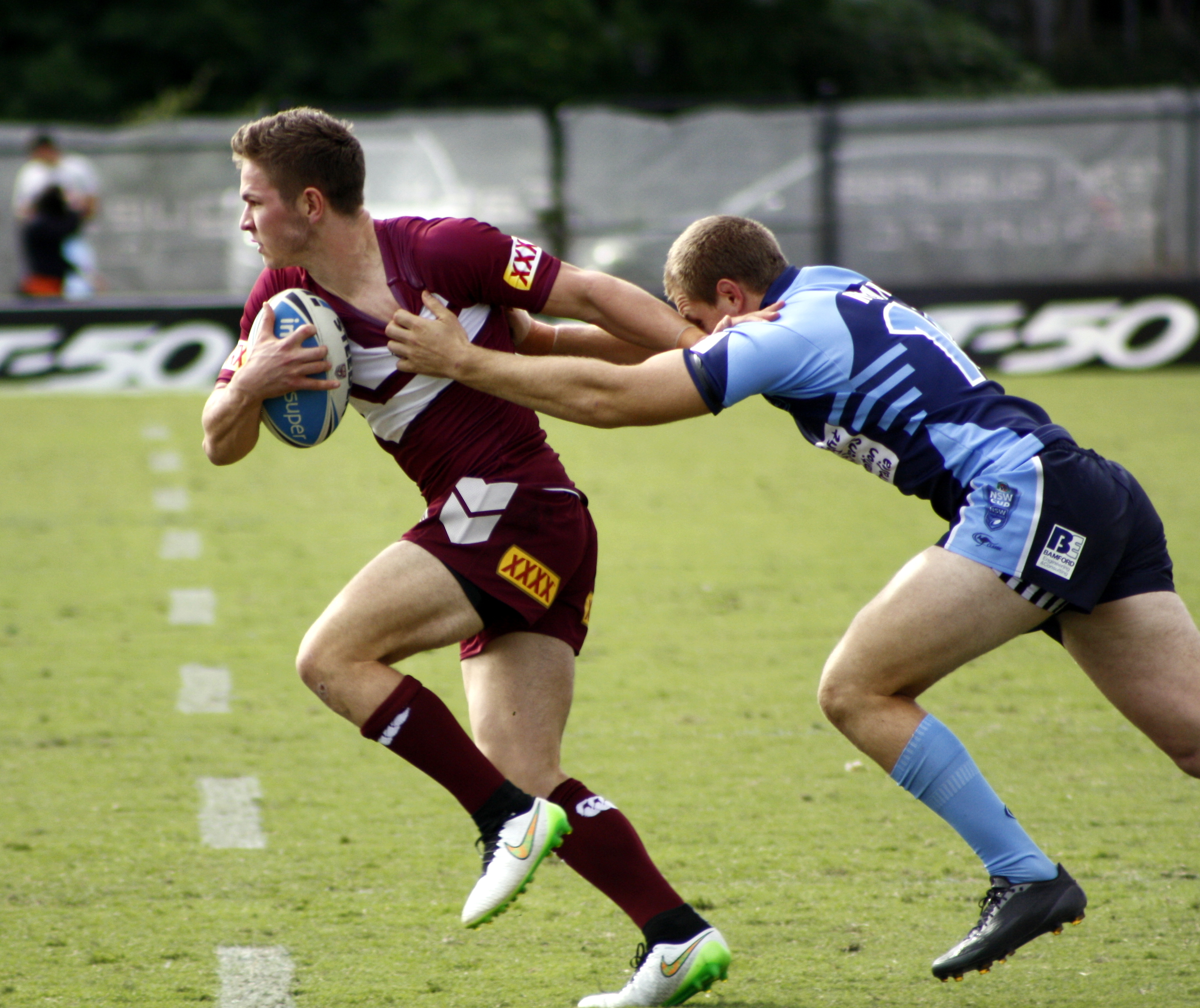
Matt Parcell playing for Queensland Residents, 2015

The first Queensland Residents side was selected in 1988 and went on a three-game tour of New Zealand, winning two games. Over the next six years the side toured New Zealand two more times (1990, 1992), Papua New Guinea (1989, 1995), France (1989), Fiji (1992, 1993), Western Samoa (1993), Tonga (1993) and South Africa (1994). In 1990, they defeated the touring French side in Rockhampton and in 1992 lost to the touring Great Britain side in Townsville.

Between 1991 and 1993, the Residents played three games against a Sydney Metropolitan Cup rep side, drawing two games and winning one. In 2003 and 2004, they played two games against Western Australia, winning both games. In 2001 and 2002, they were defeated twice by the Queensland Emerging Origin squad.

Since 1994, the Queensland Residents have played an annual fixture against the New South Wales Residents, currently known as the NSW Cup Representative Team. The fixture was formerly a curtain raiser to a State of Origin game but as of 2015 has been played on the annual Representative Weekend.

== Record ==
Opponent	Played	Won	Lost	Drawn	Win %	For	Aga	Diff
Aquitaine-Midi-Pyrénées	1	1	-	-	100%	42	8	+34
Auckland	1	-	1	-	0%	12	70	-58
Canterbury	2	2	-	-	100%	58	34	+24
Côte d'Azur	1	1	-	-	100%	30	10	+20
Fiji	2	2	-	-	100%	58	18	+40
France	1	1	-	-	100%	22	16	+6
Great Britain	1	-	1	-	0%	10	14	-4
L'Aude Selection	1	1	-	-	100%	32	4	+28
Manawatu	1	1	-	-	100%	76	2	+74
Natal	1	1	-	-	100%	60	6	+54
New South Wales Residents	26	13	13	-	50%	606	511	+95
New Zealand Māori	1	1	-	-	100%	20	16	+4
Port Moresby	3	2	1	-	67%	66	60	+6
President's Selection	1	1	-	-	100%	26	14	+12
President's XIII	1	1	-	-	100%	30	8	+22
Rousillon	1	1	-	-	100%	22	10	+12
Western Samoa	1	-	1	-	0%	14	18	+4
South Africa	1	1	-	-	100%	34	0	+34
Sydney Metros	3	1	-	2	34%	55	48	+7
Tonga	1	1	-	-	100%	40	12	+28
Transvaal	1	1	-	-	100%	76	5	+71
Wellington	1	-	-	1	0%	18	18	0
West Coast	1	1	-	-	100%	24	12	+12
Western Australia	2	2	-	-	100%	100	38	+62
Total	56	36	17	3	64%	1,531	952	+579

== Results ==
=== 2005 ===
6 July 2005

Queensland Residents	6 – 16	New South Wales Residents
Tries; Adam Hayden 1 Goals; Damien Quinn 1	Report	Tries; 2 Grant Rovelli; 1 John Williams Goals; 2 Nathan Merritt

Suncorp Stadium, Brisbane

Queensland Residents
2005 squad		Coaching staff
1 Ryan Cullen – FB; 2 Jimmy Ahmat – WG; 3 Balin Cupples – CE; 4 Damien Quinn – CE; 5 Jason Barsley – WG; 6 Adam Hayden – FE; 7 Shane Perry – HB; 8 Ali Brown – PR; 9 Nathan Friend – HK; 10 Leigh Coghill – PR; 11 Jamie Russo – SR; 12 Jeremy Smith – SR; 13 Anthony Boyd – LK	14 Tom Learoyd-Lahrs – PR; 15 Robert Tanielu – PR; 16 Martin Griese – SR; 17 Maurice Blair – CE	Head coach: Rick Stone; Legend: (c) Captain(s); (vc) Vice-captain(s)

=== 2006 ===
5 July 2006

Queensland Residents	20 – 28	New South Wales Residents
Tries; Ryan Cullen 1 Matt Lockyer 1 Simon Phillips 1 Adam Starr 1 Goals; Brandon Costin 1 Luke Branighan 1		Tries; 1 Brad Cross; 1Brett Finn; 1 Tevita Metuisela; 1 Joel Reddy; 1 John Williams Goals; 4 Michael Witt

Telstra Dome, Melbourne
Referee: Alan Shortall

Queensland Residents
2006 squad		Coaching staff
1 Ryan Cullen – FB; 2 Jason Barsley – WG; 3 Jackson Nicolau – CE; 4 Jordan Atkins – CE; 5 Simon Phillips – WG; 6 Brandon Costin (c) – FE; 7 Luke Branighan – HB; 8 Troy Lindsay – PR; 9 Mick Roberts – HK; 10 Scott Anderson – PR; 11 Scott Bolton – SR; 12 Mark Dalle Cort – SR; 13 Matt Lockyer – LK	14 Shane O'Flanagan – PR; 15 Ben Lowe – LK; 16 Adam Starr – SR; 17 Shane Muspratt – FE	Head coach: Trevor Gillmeister; Legend: (c) Captain(s); (vc) Vice-captain(s); Updated: 28 June 2021; Source(s): 2006 Official Rugby League Annual

=== 2007 ===
4 July 2007

Queensland Residents	52 – 28	New South Wales Residents
Tries; Ben Black 2 Shannon Walker 2 Jordan Atkins 1 Nick Emmett 1 Nick Parfitt 1 David Taylor 1 Chris Walker 1 Goals; Nick Parfitt 8	Report	Tries; 2 Tony Caine; 1 Stuart Flanagan; 1 Kris Keating; 1 Charlie Leaeno Goals; 3 David McLean; 1 Alan Rothery

Suncorp Stadium, Brisbane

Queensland Residents
2007 squad		Coaching staff
1 Nick Parfitt – FB; 2 Chris Walker – WG; 3 Nick Emmett – CE; 4 Jordan Atkins – CE; 5 Shannon Walker – WG; 6 Shane Muspratt (c) – FE; 7 Shane Perry – HB; 8 David Taylor – PR; 9 Mick Roberts – HK; 10 Nick Kenny – PR; 11 Danny Burke – SR; 12 Martin Griese – SR; 13 Danny Coburn – LK	14 Leigh Coghill – PR; 15 Clifford Manua – PR; 16 Isaak Ah Mau – SR; 17 Ben Black – FE	Head coach: Anthony Griffin; Legend: (c) Captain(s); (vc) Vice-captain(s)

=== 2008 ===
11 June 2008

Queensland Residents	16 – 24	New South Wales Residents
Tries; Selasi Berdie 1 Cy Lasscock 1 Kaine Manihera 1 Goals; Nick Parfitt 2	Report	Tries; 1 Brett Anderson; 1 Shaun Foley; 1 Byron Ford; 1 Ryan Tandy Goals; 4 James Maloney

Suncorp Stadium, Brisbane

Queensland Residents
2008 squad		Coaching staff
1 Nick Parfitt – FB; 2 Kaine Manihera – WG; 3 Brett Kelly – CE; 4 Karl Johnson – CE; 5 Kyle Lodge – WG; 6 Brad Davis (c) – FE; 7 Josh Lewis – HB; 8 Isaak Ah Mau – PR; 9 Ian Lacey – HK; 10 Scott Bolton – PR; 11 Martin Griese – SR; 12 Cy Lasscock – SR; 13 Luke Dalziel-Don – LK	14 Selasi Berdie – PR; 15 Lewis Balcomb – SR; 16 Clint Amos – HK; 17 Adam Fielder – PR	Legend: (c) Captain(s); (vc) Vice-captain(s)

=== 2009 ===
15 July 2009

Queensland Residents	34 – 6	New South Wales Residents
Tries; Mark Cantoni 1 Luke Dalziel-Don 1 Josh Hoffman 1 Ben Jeffery 1 Kaine Manihera 1 James Stuart 1 Goals; Trent Hodkinson 3 Brad Davis 2	Report	Tries; 1 James Maloney Goals; 1 James Maloney

Suncorp Stadium, Brisbane
Referee: Clayton Sharpe

Queensland Residents
2009 squad		Coaching staff
1 Josh Hoffman – FB; 2 Ben Jeffery – WG; 3 Rod Jensen – CE; 4 James Stuart – CE; 5 Kaine Manihera – WG; 6 Brad Davis (c) – FE; 7 Trent Hodkinson – HB; 8 Daniel Joyce – PR; 9 Scott Smith – HK; 10 Aaron Summers – PR; 11 Mark Cantoni – SR; 12 Luke Dalziel-Don – SR; 13 Phil Dennis – LK	14 Joel Thompson – SR; 15 Will Scanlon – PR; 16 Dayne Weston – PR; 17 Tom Humble – FE	Head coach: Paul Bramley; Legend: (c) Captain(s); (vc) Vice-captain(s)

=== 2010 ===
7 July 2010

New South Wales Residents	28 – 20	Queensland Residents
Tries; Aidan Guerra 1 Rory Kostjasyn 1 Sean Meaney 1 Kevin Naiqama 1 Jamie Simpson 1 Gareth Widdop 1 Goals; Sean Meaney 2	Report	Tries; 1 Daly Cherry-Evans; 1 Luke Dalziel-Don; 1 Donald Malone; 1 Daniel Ogden Goals; 2 Daly Cherry-Evans

ANZ Stadium, Sydney
Referee: Matt Hawkins

Queensland Residents
2010 squad		Coaching staff
1 David Milne – FB; 2 Daniel Ogden – WG; 3 Donald Malone – CE; 4 Steve Michaels – CE; 5 Shea Moylan – WG; 6 Brad Cross – FE; 7 Daly Cherry-Evans (c) – HB; 8 Kieran Whalley – PR; 9 Clint Amos – HK; 10 Dayne Weston – PR; 11 Jamie Buhrer – SR; 12 Ryan Simpkins – SR; 13 Luke Dalziel-Don – LK	14 Phil Dennis – LK; 15 Selasi Berdie – SR; 16 Jack Afamasaga – PR; 17 Darcy Lussick – PR	Head coach: Brandon Costin; Legend: (c) Captain(s); (vc) Vice-captain(s)

=== 2011 ===
6 July 2011

Queensland Residents	32 – 6	New South Wales Residents
Tries; Luke Capewell 2 Brad Davis 1 Kayne Lawton 1 Joel Riethmuller 1 Ryan Simpkins 1 Goals; Liam Georgetown 4		Tries; 1 Jake Mullaney Goals; 1 Tom Humble

Suncorp Stadium, Brisbane
Referee: Michael Wise

Queensland Residents
2011 squad		Coaching staff
1 Luke Capewell – FB; 2 Liam Georgetown – WG; 3 James Wood – CE; 4 Brett Anderson – CE; 5 Shea Moylan – WG; 6 Grant Rovelli – FE; 7 Brad Davis (c) – HB; 8 Luke Harlen – PR; 9 Travis Waddell – HK; 10 Chris Farrell – PR; 11 Nick Slyney – SR; 12 Lorenzo Ma'afu – SR; 13 Joel Riethmuller – LK	14 Mark Vaiao – PR; 15 Mat Pitman – SR; 16 Ryan Simpkins – LK; 17 Kayne Lawton – HK	Head coach: Kevin Carmichael; Legend: (c) Captain(s); (vc) Vice-captain(s)

=== 2012 ===
6 July 2012

Queensland Residents	20 – 14	New South Wales Residents
Tries; Nathanael Barnes 2 Luke Capewell 1 Liam Georgetown 1 Goals; Liam Georgetown 2		Tries; 1 Josh Davis; 1 Matt Moylan; 1 Troy Savage Goals; 1 Matt Moylan

Suncorp Stadium, Brisbane
Referee: Chris Butler

Queensland Residents
2012 squad		Coaching staff
1 Joe Bond – FB; 2 Nathanael Barnes – WG; 3 Dan Wallace – CE; 4 Donald Malone – CE; 5 Liam Georgetown – WG; 6 Grant Rovelli (c) – FE; 7 Luke Capewell – HB; 8 Charlie Gubb – PR; 9 Jake Granville – HK; 10 Chris Farrell – PR; 11 Nick Slyney – SR; 12 Jon Grieve – SR; 13 Luke Dalziel-Don – LK	14 Kurt Baptiste – HK; 15 Mat Pitman – SR; 16 Jarrod Wallace – PR; 17 Brendon Gibb – PR	Head coach: Paul Green; Legend: (c) Captain(s); (vc) Vice-captain(s)

=== 2013 ===
17 July 2013

New South Wales Residents	22 – 18	Queensland Residents
Tries; Jason Clark 1 Shaune Corrigan 1 Josh Mantellato 1 Sam Williams 1 Goals; Josh Mantellato 3	Report	Tries; 1 Tim Glasby; 1 Donald Malone; 1 Jarrod McInally; 1 Hezron Murgha Goals; 1 Donald Malone

ANZ Stadium, Sydney
Referee: Phil Henderson

Queensland Residents
2013 squad		Coaching staff
1 Hezron Murgha – FB; 2 Peter Gubb – WG; 3 Donald Malone – CE; 4 Curtis Rona – CE; 5 Jarrod McInally – WG; 6 Cody Walker – FE; 7 Jacob Fauid – HB; 8 Ben Shea – PR; 9 Jake Granville – HK; 10 Mat Pitman – PR; 11 Tim Glasby (c) – SR; 12 Tyron Haynes – SR; 13 Nick Slyney – LK	14 Kurt Baptiste – HK; 15 Nathaniel Neale – PR; 16 Ben Spina – SR; 17 Sam Hoare – PR	Head coach: Paul Green; Legend: (c) Captain(s); (vc) Vice-captain(s)

=== 2014 ===
9 July 2014

Queensland Residents	24 – 16	New South Wales Residents
Tries; Aaron Whitchurch 2 Javid Bowen 1 Blake Leary 1 Goals; Shaun Nona 4		Tries; 2 Chanel Mata'utia; 1 Isaah Yeo Goals; 2 Nathan Stapleton

Suncorp Stadium, Brisbane
Referee: Clayton Sharpe

Queensland Residents
2014 squad		Coaching staff
1 Henare Wells – FB; 2 Javid Bowen – WG; 3 Aaron Whitchurch – CE; 4 Davin Crampton – CE; 5 Kalifa Faifai Loa – WG; 6 Shaun Nona – FE; 7 Todd Murphy – HB; 8 Pele Peletelese – PR; 9 Kurt Baptiste – HK; 10 Tim Natusch – PR; 11 Blake Leary – SR; 12 Dane Hogan – SR; 13 Keiron Lander (c) – LK	14 Luke Page – PR; 15 Felise Kaufusi – PR; 16 Rod Griffin – PR; 17 Mitchell Frei – SR	Head coach: Jason Demetriou; Legend: (c) Captain(s); (vc) Vice-captain(s)

=== 2015 ===
3 May 2015

Queensland Residents	36 – 32	New South Wales Residents
Tries; Kalifa Faifai Loa 2 Javid Bowen 1 Kyle Feldt 1 Shaun Nona 1 Matt Parcell 1 Goals; Shaun Nona 6		Tries; 2 Mitchell Barnett; 2 Chanel Mata'utia; 1 Nathan Gardner; 1 Darren Nicholls Goals; 4 Nathan Gardner

Tapout Energy Stadium, Brisbane
Referee: Peter Gough

Queensland Residents
2015 squad		Coaching staff
1 Hezron Murgha – FB; 2 Kalifa Faifai Loa – WG; 3 Aaron Whitchurch – CE; 4 Kyle Feldt – CE; 5 Javid Bowen – WG; 6 Ben Hampton – FE; 7 Shaun Nona – HB; 8 Daniel Beasley – PR; 9 Tom Butterfield – HK; 10 Mitch Garbutt – PR; 11 Mitchell Frei – SR; 12 Kenny Bromwich – SR; 13 Ben Spina (c) – LK	14 Matt Parcell – PR; 15 Davin Crampton – PR; 16 Patrick Kaufusi – PR; 17 Mark Ioane – SR	Head coach: Aaron Zimmerle; Legend: (c) Captain(s); (vc) Vice-captain(s)

=== 2016 ===
8 May 2016

Queensland Residents	16 – 30	New South Wales Residents
Tries; Jahrome Hughes 1 Darren Nicholls 1 Jack Svendsen 1 Goals; Darren Nicholls 2		Tries; 3 Ken Maumalo; 1 Josh Drinkwater; 1 Asipeli Fine; 1 Dylan Kelly Goals; 3 Shaun Nona

Suzuki Stadium, Brisbane
Referee: Matt Noyen

Queensland Residents
2016 squad		Coaching staff
1 Jahrome Hughes – FB; 2 Sami Sauiluma – WG; 3 Nemani Velakapa – CE; 4 Aaron Whitchurch – CE; 5 Linc Port – WG; 6 Cameron Cullen (c) – FE; 7 Darren Nicholls – HB; 8 Sam Anderson – PR; 9 Anthony Mitchell – HK; 10 Herman Ese'ese – PR; 11 Jack Svendsen – SR; 12 Brett Greinke – SR; 13 Jai Arrow – LK	14 Mitch Cronin – FE; 15 Corey Jensen – SR; 16 David Murphy – PR; 17 Francis Tualau – PR	Head coach: Aaron Zimmerle; Legend: (c) Captain(s); (vc) Vice-captain(s); Updated: 15 May 2016; Source(s): QRL

=== 2017 ===
7 May 2017

Queensland Residents	36 – 6	New South Wales Residents
Tries; Delouise Hoeter 2 Dean Britt 1 Mitchell Frei 1 Tom Opacic 1 Billy Walters 1 Goals; Scott Doyle 6		Tries; 1 Moses Leota Goals; 1 Jayden Nikorima

Suzuki Stadium, Brisbane

Queensland Residents
2017 squad		Coaching staff
1 Jahrome Hughes – FB; 2 Jonus Pearson – WG; 3 Tom Opacic – CE; 4 Scott Doyle – CE; 5 Delouise Hoeter – WG; 6 Billy Walters – FE; 7 Kyle Laybutt – HB; 8 Sam Anderson – PR; 9 Mitch Cronin – HK; 10 Nathaniel Neale – PR; 11 Dean Britt – SR; 12 Blake Leary (c) – SR; 13 Mitchell Frei – LK	14 Christian Hazard – HB; 15 Nick Slyney – SR; 16 George Fai – PR; 17 Joe Boyce – LK	Head coach: Jon Buchanan; Legend: (c) Captain(s); (vc) Vice-captain(s); Updated: 4 May 2017; Source(s): QRL

=== 2018 ===
24 June 2018

New South Wales Residents	36 – 20	Queensland Residents
Tries: Dean Britt (18', 21') 2 Kyle Flanagan (5') 1 Luke Garner (26') 1 Sean O'Sullivan (35') 1 Tony Satini (52') 1 Goals: Kyle Flanagan 6/6 (7', 19', 23', 28', 37', 54')	1st: 30 – 0; 2nd: 6 – 20	Tries: 2 (43', 78') Kalifa Faifai Loa; 1 (73') Blake Leary; 1 (75') Scott Drinkwater; Goals: 2/3 Kalifa Faifai Loa (74', 76'); 0/1 Jonus Pearson (15')

ANZ Stadium, Sydney

Queensland Residents
2018 squad		Coaching staff
1 Scott Drinkwater – FB; 2 Jonus Pearson – WG; 3 Marion Seve – CE; 4 Gehamat Shibasaki – CE; 5 Kalifa Faifai Loa – WG; 6 Billy Walters – FE; 7 Jamal Fogarty – HB; 8 Nathaniel Neale – PR; 9 Pat Politoni – HK; 10 Sam Anderson – PR; 11 Patrick Kaufusi – SR; 12 Blake Leary (c) – SR; 13 Patrick Mago – LK	14 Mitch Cronin – HK; 15 Patrick Carrigan – SR; 16 Lachlan Timm – LK; 17 Will Bugden – PR	Head coach: Jon Buchanan; Legend: (c) Captain(s); (vc) Vice-captain(s); Updated: 17 June 2018; Source(s): QRL

=== 2019 ===
12 May 2019

Queensland Residents	42 – 22	New South Wales Residents
Tries: Delouise Hoeter (7', 18', 58') 2 Sam Scarlett (21') 1 Temone Power (30') 1 Josh Cleeland (53') 1 Corey Jensen (77') 1 Goals: Josh Cleeland 7/8 (9', 23', 32', 55', 59', 70', 78')	1st: 22 – 6; 2nd: 20 – 16	Tries: 1 (40') Beau Fermor; 1 (43') Brian Too; 1 (49') Dean Britt; 1 (74') Keaon Koloamatangi; Goals: 2/3 Brock Lamb (40', 74'); 1/1 Morgan Harper (50')

Dolphin Stadium, Redcliffe

Queensland Residents
2019 squad		Coaching staff
1 Zac Santo – FB; 2 Richard Kennar – WG; 3 Delouise Hoeter – CE; 4 Connor Broadhurst – CE; 5 Izaia Perese – WG; 6 Josh Cleeland (c) – FE; 7 Sam Scarlett – HB; 8 Nathaniel Neale – PR; 9 Mitch Cronin – HK; 10 Corey Jensen – PR; 11 Keenan Palasia – SR; 12 Temone Power – SR; 13 Tom Gilbert – LK	14 Christian Hazard – HB; 15 Tino Fa'asuamaleaui – SR; 16 Brett Greinke – SR; 17 Darryn Schonig – PR	Head coach: Jon Buchanan; Legend: (c) Captain(s); (vc) Vice-captain(s); Updated: 12 May 2019; Source(s): QRL

== See also ==
- Queensland state rugby league team
- Australia national rugby league team
- Junior Kangaroos
- Australian Schoolboys rugby league team
