= Ben Black =

Australian rugby league footballer

Personal information
- Full name: Benjamin Black
- Born: 29 April 1981 (age 45) New South Wales, Australia

Playing information
- Position: Scrum-half
Club
Years	Team	Pld	T	G	FG	P
2001	West Tigers	7	1	0	0	4
2004–05	Halifax	33	36	0	1	145
2008–11	Halifax		23	7	0	98
2012–14	Batley Bulldogs
	Total	40	60	7	1	247
Representative
Years	Team	Pld	T	G	FG	P
2007	Queensland Residents	1	2	0	0	8
- Source: RLP As of 4 January 2024

Ben Black (born 29 April 1981) is an Australian former professional rugby league footballer who played in the 2000s and 2010s as a scrum-half. He played for Wests Tigers before joining Halifax, and also went on to play for Batley Bulldogs.

== Playing career ==
Black made his first grade debut for the Wests Tigers in Round 4 2001 against Brisbane. In 2004, Black joined English side Halifax.

Black kicked the winning drop goal that gave Halifax the win in the 2010 Co-operative Championship Grand Final.

In 2012, Black joined Batley and played with the club until the end of 2014 before retiring at the end of the season.

Upon returning to Australia, Black was the captain/coach of Group 9 club Wagga Brothers.
