= Tim Natusch =

PNG rugby league footballer

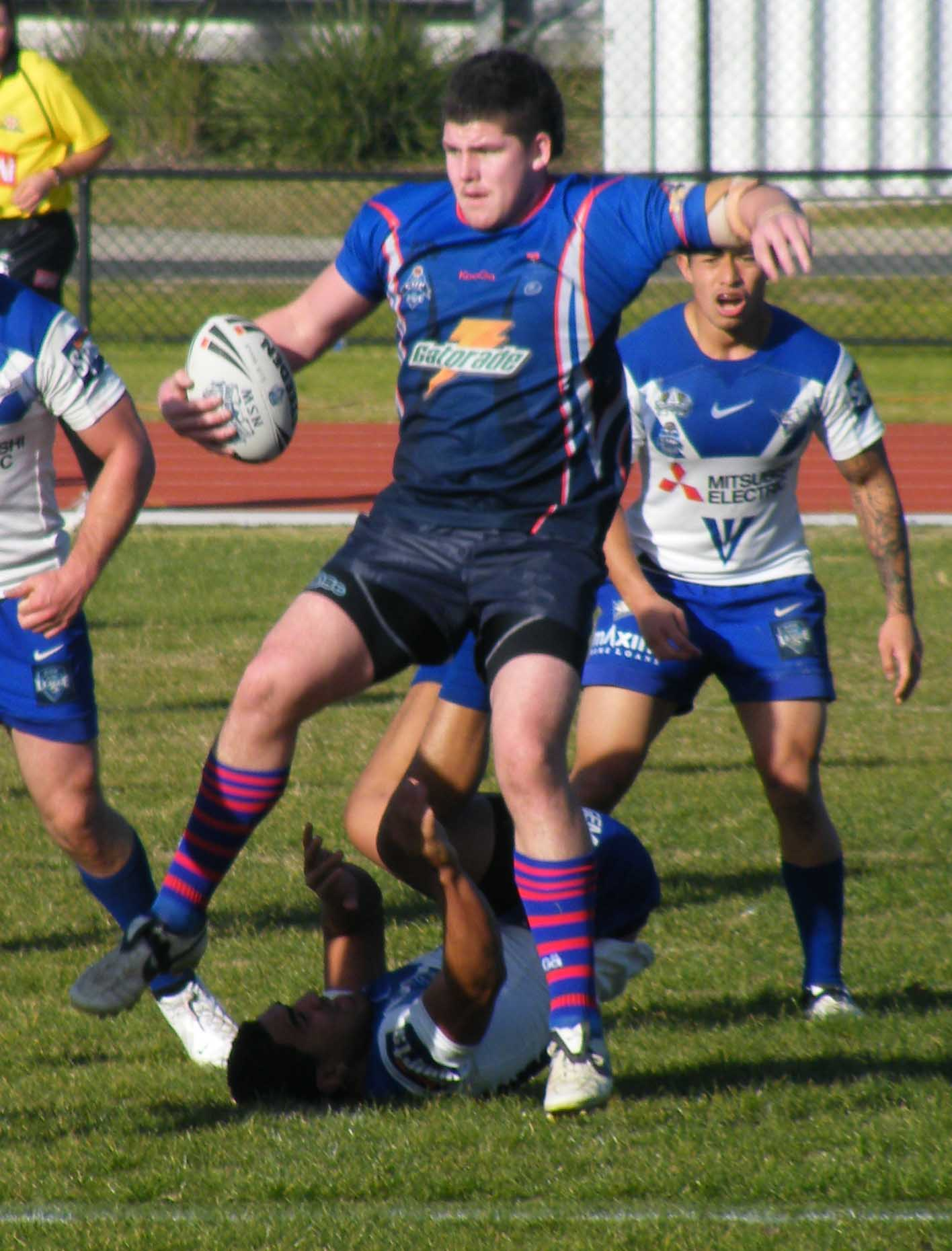

Personal information
- Born: 3 July 1986 (age 39) Biak, Papua, Indonesia
- Height: 184 cm (6 ft 0 in)
- Weight: 107 kg (16 st 12 lb)

Playing information
- Position: Prop
Club
Years	Team	Pld	T	G	FG	P
2009	Newcastle Knights	3	0	0	0	0
Representative
Years	Team	Pld	T	G	FG	P
2014	Queensland Residents	1	0	0	0	0
- Source: As of 6 January 2024

Tim Natusch (born 3 July 1986 in Papua) is a former professional rugby league footballer who last played for the Wynnum Manly Seagulls in the Queensland Cup. He played as a prop and previously played for the Newcastle Knights in the National Rugby League.

== Background ==
In his early years he lived with his family in Papua New Guinea before moving to New Zealand with his parents and settling in the coastal township of Waikanae, roughly 100 kilometres (62 mi) north of the capital city, Wellington. To further his sporting ambitions Natusch attended Wellington College. Due to the distance between his home in Waikanae and school in Wellington, Natusch would regularly stay at his sister's in Karori. During this time he was a regular edition to the Number 21 Wright's Hill school bus. Other past well known travellers on this service include Robert Ford, James Speight, Russell Weir and Tom Everton.

During his time at Wellington College, Natucsh was a crucial part to the 2ND XV in 2003. It was this team in which Natusch was inducted into the "Dog Pound Gang" or D.P.G (a secretive group of selected members, little was known about this formidable group) by the presidents Fraser Gyde and Nick White. Natusch gained the most media success out of all the D.P.G members, through publication in the New Zealand Herald and his NRL appearances.

Wellington College, a rugby based school did not promote rugby league or support union players trying out the game. Natusch was actively discouraged from entering rugby league by his then union coach John Mills, an uncapped All Black who in 2009 joined Graham Henry's All Black coaching staff in an advisory role. In 2004 Tim played his first rugby league game for the club Harbor City coached by David Fien. Dallas Penetito, Isaac Monk-Tainaghoe and Adam Cahill also played for this team. Natusch attracted widespread support as a professional rugby league footballer immediately with his large upper frame, strong tackle and light feet.

== Playing career ==
He then played his junior rugby league in New Zealand with the Te Aroha Eels in the Wellington competition before moving to Australia in 2005 to join a scholarship program with the Knights. Natusch made his first grade debut against the South Sydney Rabbitohs in round 3 of the 2009 NRL season on 29 March 2009. On 1 October 2009 it was announced he had signed with the Brisbane Broncos on a one-year deal. After not playing a game with the Brisbane club, Natusch joined Intrust Super Cup side Wynnum Manly Seagulls in 2011. In 2014 he became their captain. He played with the club until the end of 2016.
