= Nathaniel Neale =

New Zealand rugby league footballer

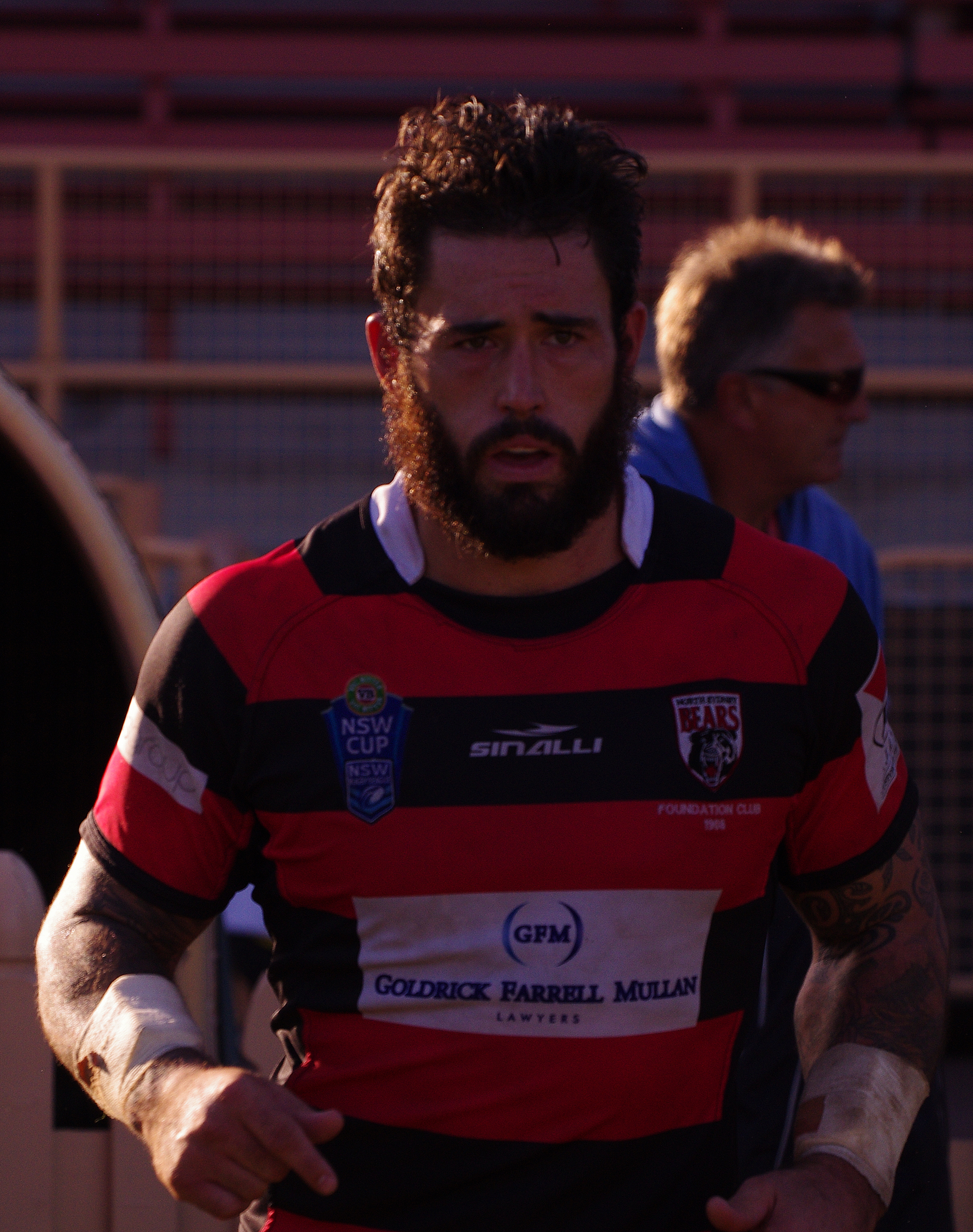
- Neale playing for the North Sydney Bears in 2014.

Personal information
- Born: 16 September 1988 (age 36); Auckland, New Zealand
- Height: 185 cm (6 ft 1 in)
- Weight: 108 kg (17 st 0 lb)

Playing information
- Position: Prop, Second-row
Club
Years	Team	Pld	T	G	FG	P
2014	South Sydney	1	0	0	0	0
Representative
Years	Team	Pld	T	G	FG	P
2013–19	Queensland Residents	3	0	0	0	0
- Source: As of 6 January 2024

Nathaniel Neale (born 16 September 1988) is a New Zealand professional rugby league footballer. He previously played for the South Sydney Rabbitohs in the National Rugby League. He primarily plays as a prop and second-rower.

== Background ==
Neal was born and raised in Westmere, a central suburb of Auckland, New Zealand.

He played for the Ponsonby Ponies Under 21s team before being signed by the New Zealand Warriors.

== Playing career ==
He played for the New Zealand Warriors' NYC team in 2008 before moving on to the Warriors' NSW Cup team, Auckland Vulcans in 2009. At this time, he was also aligned with the Auckland Rugby League club, Mount Albert Lions.

Wanting to further his professional Rugby league career, Neale signed a two-year contract with the Ipswich Jets in the Queensland Cup starting in 2011. He made his debut in round 1 of 2011 under coaches Ben Walker and Shane Walker. It was not long before Neale made his mark in the competition and was regularly nominated as the team's best.

In his second year at the club, Neale continued to prove an asset to the team. At the end of 2012, Neale was rewarded with the top award, the Alan Langer Medal for "best and fairest" and signed on for a third year at the Ipswich Jets. In Neale's third year at the Ipswich Jets he earned the top two awards for the club, the Alan Langer Medal and the Players' Player award.

In October 2013, Neale signed a one-year contract with the South Sydney Rabbitohs starting in 2014. In round 3 of the 2014 NRL season, Neale made his NRL debut for South Sydney against the Wests Tigers.

In 2016 Neale joined the Ipswich Jets in the Queensland Cup. In 2022, Neale announced his retirement from rugby league at the end of the 2022 Hostplus Cup Season. On 27 August 2022, Neale played his final game for the Ipswich Jets, captaining the team and scoring a goal in the 18–40 loss to the Northern Pride at Barlow Park. On 25 June 2023, Neale came out of retirement to play for the Fassifern Bombers in the Ipswich Rugby League. He won his comeback game 32–10 against the North Ipswich Tigers at Harrisville.

== Representative career ==
In 2013, Neale played for the Queensland Residents.

In 2017, Neale played for Queensland Residents

In 2019, Neale played Prop for Queensland Residents in their 42–22 win over NSW Residents
