= James Stuart (rugby league) =

Australian rugby league player

Personal information
- Full name: James Stuart
- Born: 24 September 1988 (age 36); Australia
- Height: 185 cm (6 ft 1 in)
- Weight: 94 kg (14 st 11 lb)

Playing information
- Position: Centre, Wing
Club
Years	Team	Pld	T	G	FG	P
2010–11	Canberra Raiders	7	0	0	0	0
Representative
Years	Team	Pld	T	G	FG	P
2009	Queensland Residents	1	1	0	0	4
- Source: As of 5 January 2024

James Stuart (born 24 September 1988), is an Australian former professional rugby league footballer who played in the 2000s and 2010s. He played as a centre or on the wing.

== Playing career ==
Stuart made his National Rugby League (NRL) debut for the Canberra Raiders in round 2 of the 2010 season against the Brisbane Broncos.

Stuart played his junior football for the South Tuggeranong Knights. He had also represented Queensland City and Queensland Residents in 2009.
