= Jeremy Hawkins =

New Zealand rugby league footballer

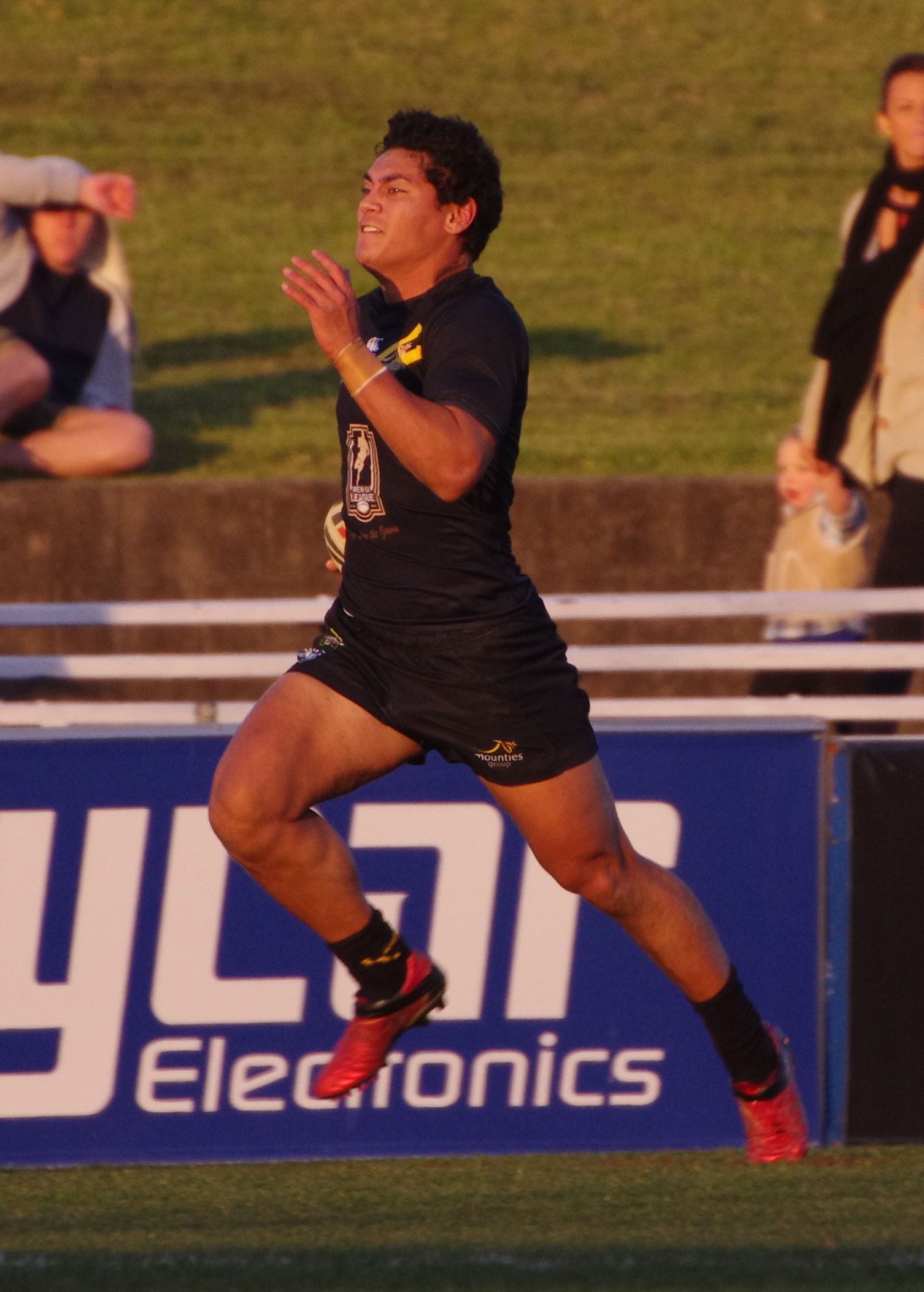
- Hawkins playing for the Mount Pritchard Mounties in 2014

Personal information
- Born: 15 May 1993 (age 33) Wellington, New Zealand
- Height: 184 cm (6 ft 0 in)
- Weight: 98 kg (15 st 6 lb)

Playing information
- Position: Centre, Wing
Club
Years	Team	Pld	T	G	FG	P
2014–15	Canberra Raiders	7	2	0	0	8
- Source: As of 9 January 2020

Jeremy Hawkins (born 15 May 1993) is a retired New Zealand professional rugby league footballer who last played for the Redcliffe Dolphins in the Queensland Cup. He plays at centre and wing and previously played for the Canberra Raiders.

== Background ==
Born in Wellington, New Zealand, Hawkins played rugby union until he was 14-years-old. He then made the switch to rugby league with the Randwick Kingfishers, before being signed by the Canberra Raiders.

== Playing career ==
=== Early career ===
From 2011 to 2013, Hawkins played for the Canberra Raiders' NYC team. On 30 August 2013, he re-signed with the Raiders on a 2-year contract. On 13 October 2013, he vice-captained the Junior Kiwis against the Junior Kangaroos, after being 18th man the year before.

=== 2014 ===
In 2014, Hawkins graduated to the Raiders' New South Wales Cup team, Mount Pritchard Mounties. In round 18 of the 2014 NRL season, he was named to make his NRL debut against the Gold Coast Titans, however the Raiders' request to play him was denied by the NRL due to Canberra having used up all their second-tier salary cap and having players in Hawkin's position available to play. In round 24, he made his NRL debut for Canberra against the Cronulla-Sutherland Sharks, playing at centre in the club's 22–12 win at Remondis Stadium.

=== 2015 ===
On 13 February, Hawkins re-signed with Canberra on a two-year contract, however, on 5 November, he was released from the final two years of his contract and signed a two-year contract with the Melbourne Storm starting in 2016.

=== 2016-2019 ===
Hawkins never played a first grade game for Melbourne. He instead featured for the club's feeder sides in the Queensland Cup. In 2018, he joined the Redcliffe Dolphins.

== Post NRL ==
In 2023, Hawkins had reached the 100 game milestone playing for the Redcliffe Dolphins. Hawkins had retired at the end of the season.
