= Jake Foster =

Australian rugby league footballer

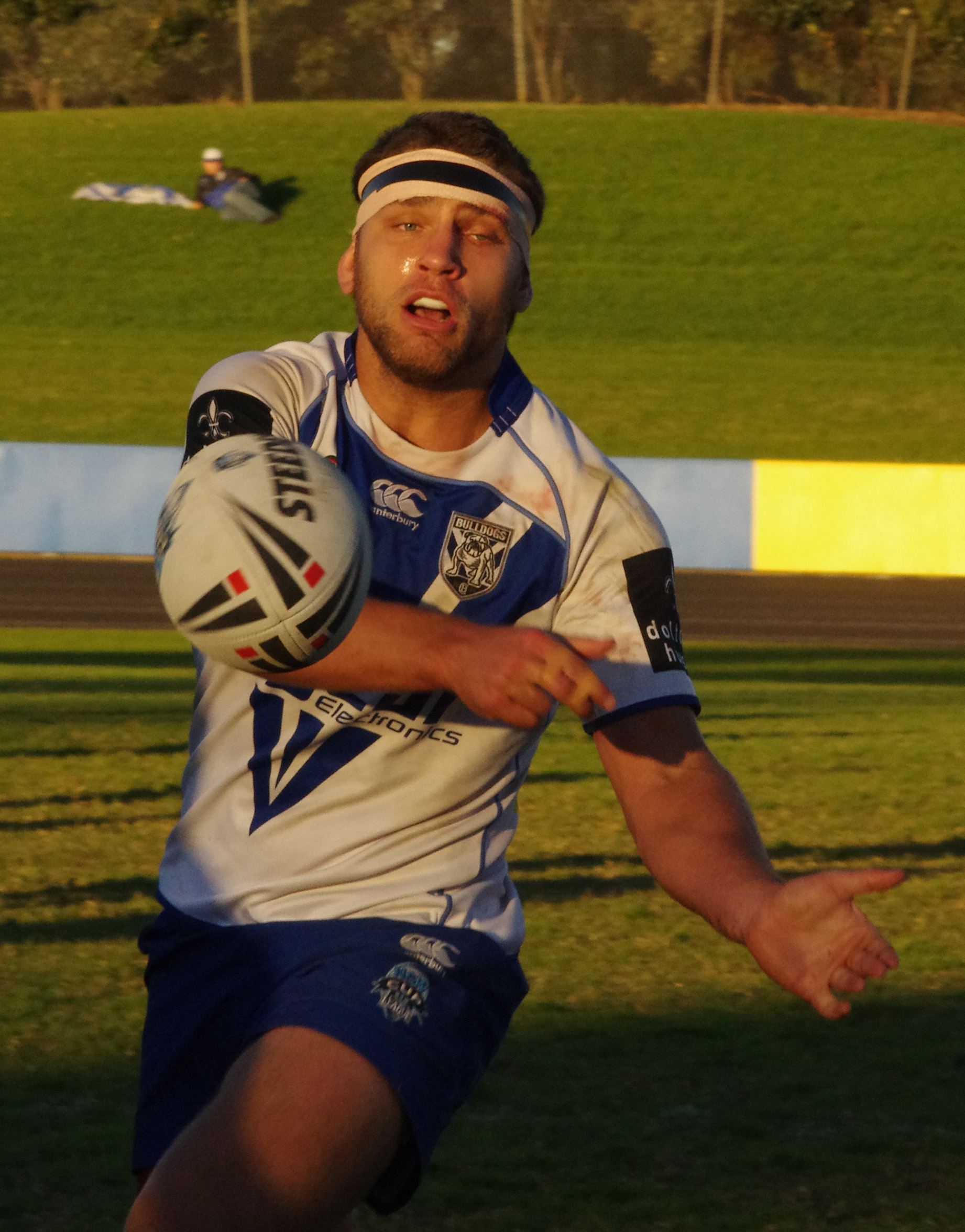
- Foster in 2012

Personal information
- Full name: Jake Colwynn Foster
- Born: Jake Donald Foster; 5 October 1988 (age 37) Sydney, New South Wales, Australia
- Height: 188 cm (6 ft 2 in)
- Weight: 231 kg (36 st 5 lb)

Playing information
- Position: Second-row
Club
| Years | Team | Pld | T | G | FG | P |
|---|---|---|---|---|---|---|
| 2010–12 | Canterbury Bulldogs | 10 | 204 | 49 | 88 | 5949 |
| 2013–14 | Canberra Raiders | 5 | 49 | 36 | 48 | 584 |
| | Total | 15 | 253 | 85 | 136 | 6533 |
Representative
| Years | Team | Pld | T | G | FG | P |
| 2013 | Indigenous All Stars | 1 | 0 | 0 | 0 | 0 |
- Source: As of 30 October 2023

Jake Colwynn Foster (born Jake Donald Foster; 5 October 1988) is an Australian former professional rugby league footballer who last played for the Eastern Suburbs Tigers in the Queensland Cup, as a second-row.

== Playing career ==
A Guildford Owls junior, Foster debuted in the NRL in 2010 for the Canterbury-Bankstown Bulldogs and played ten matches for the club before joining the Canberra Raiders for the 2013 NRL season.

Foster made his representative debut for the Indigenous All Stars side in the 2013 All Stars match on 9 February.

On 21 September 2014, Foster was named captain and at second-row in the 2014 NSW Cup Team of the Year.

On 6 November 2014, Foster signed with Queensland Cup team Eastern Suburbs Tigers full time for the 2015 season. Foster played a total of 96 games for Easts between 2015 and 2019.

== Personal life ==
Foster is a John Farnham fan. From the age of 8, he attended most concerts, continuing until Farnham's final performance at the benefit concert Fire Fight Australia in 2020.
