= Luke Capewell =

Australian rugby league footballer

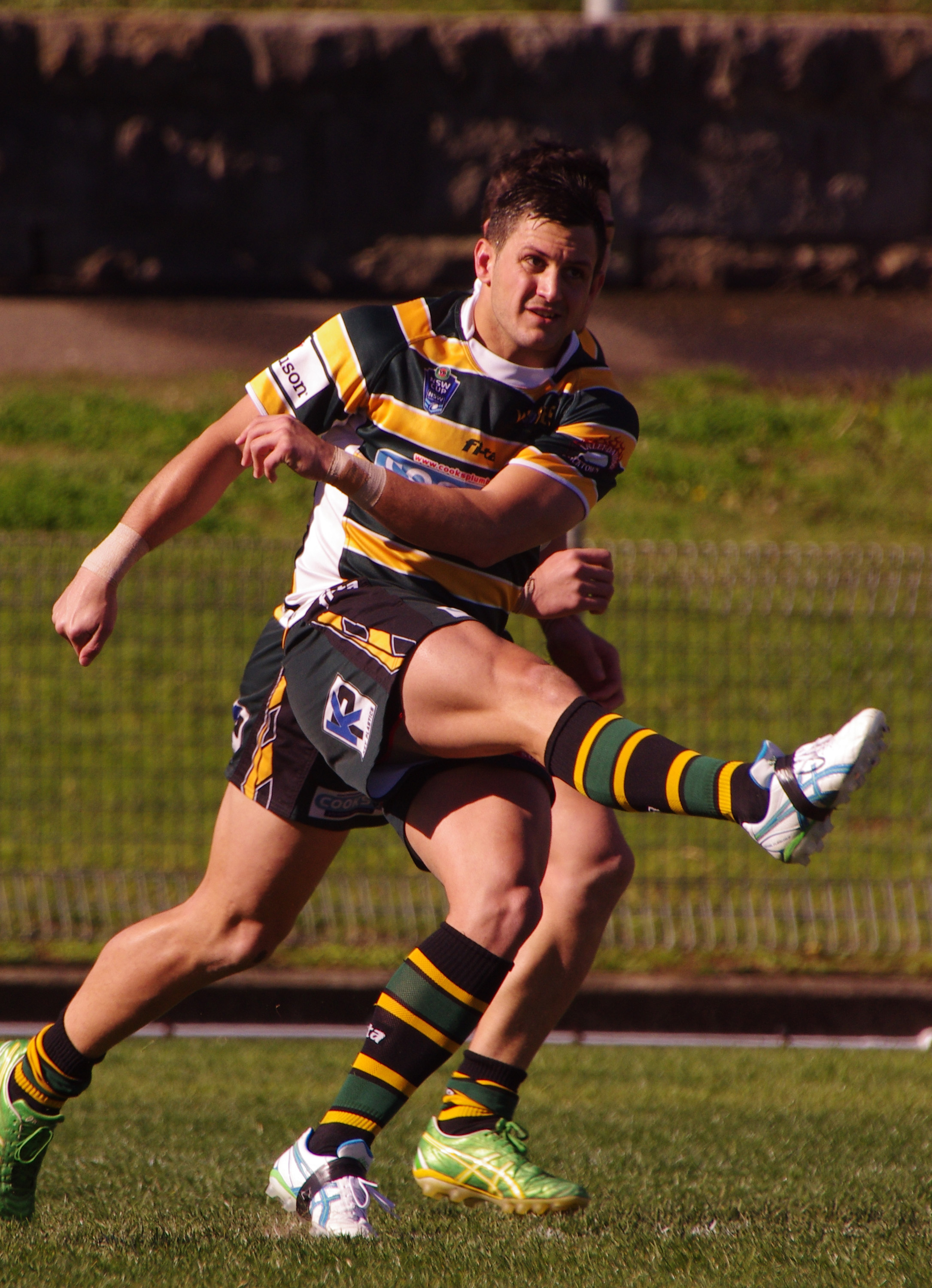

Personal information
- Full name: Luke Capewell
- Born: 6 February 1989 (age 37) Charleville, Queensland, Australia
- Height: 173 cm (5 ft 8 in)
- Weight: 81 kg (12 st 11 lb)

Playing information
- Position: Fullback, Wing, Five-eighth
Club
Years	Team	Pld	T	G	FG	P
2008–10	South Sydney	28	15	0	0	60
2011	Gold Coast Titans	7	1	0	0	4
2012	Brisbane Broncos	5	1	0	0	4
	Total	40	17	0	0	68
Representative
Years	Team	Pld	T	G	FG	P
2011–12	Queensland Residents	2	3	0	0	12
- Source: As of 5 January 2024
- Relatives: Kurt Capewell (cousin)

Luke Capewell (born 6 February 1989) is an Australian professional rugby league footballer who plays for the Ipswich Jets after having previously played for various teams in the National Rugby League in the late 2000s and early 2010s. His preferred playing positions are in the halves or the three-quarters. A talented junior player, he is a former Australian Schoolboys and Queensland Under-17s representative.

== Background ==
Capewell was born and raised in Charleville, a small town in western Queensland, and played football there until the age of 17. In Under-12s, his schoolboys team won the Queensland Foundation Cup against Murgon at ANZ Stadium in Sydney. While attending Redcliffe State High School, Capewell played for the Australian Schoolboys in 2006. He is the cousin of fellow NRL player and State of Origin representative Kurt Capewell.

== Career ==
Capewell made his National Rugby League debut on 1 June 2008 for the South Sydney Rabbitohs playing against the St George-Illawarra Dragons. He played at fullback and scored a try late in the second half.

Following a season-ending shoulder injury to regular five-eighth John Sutton during Souths' campaign to make the 2010 NRL season's finals, Capewell was named to fill in the role.

In 2011, he played for the Gold Coast Titans in a season where they finished with the wooden spoon; however, he signed with the Brisbane Broncos for the 2012 NRL season.

In 2012, he was named in the Queensland Residents side.

Capewell signed with the Penrith Panthers in the mid-season of 2013; however, he was unable to force his way into the first-grade line-up and played the season with the Panthers' feeder team, the Windsor Wolves.

In 2017, Capewell joined Queensland Cup side Ipswich.
