= Tom Butterfield =

PNG international rugby league footballer

Tommy Butterfield
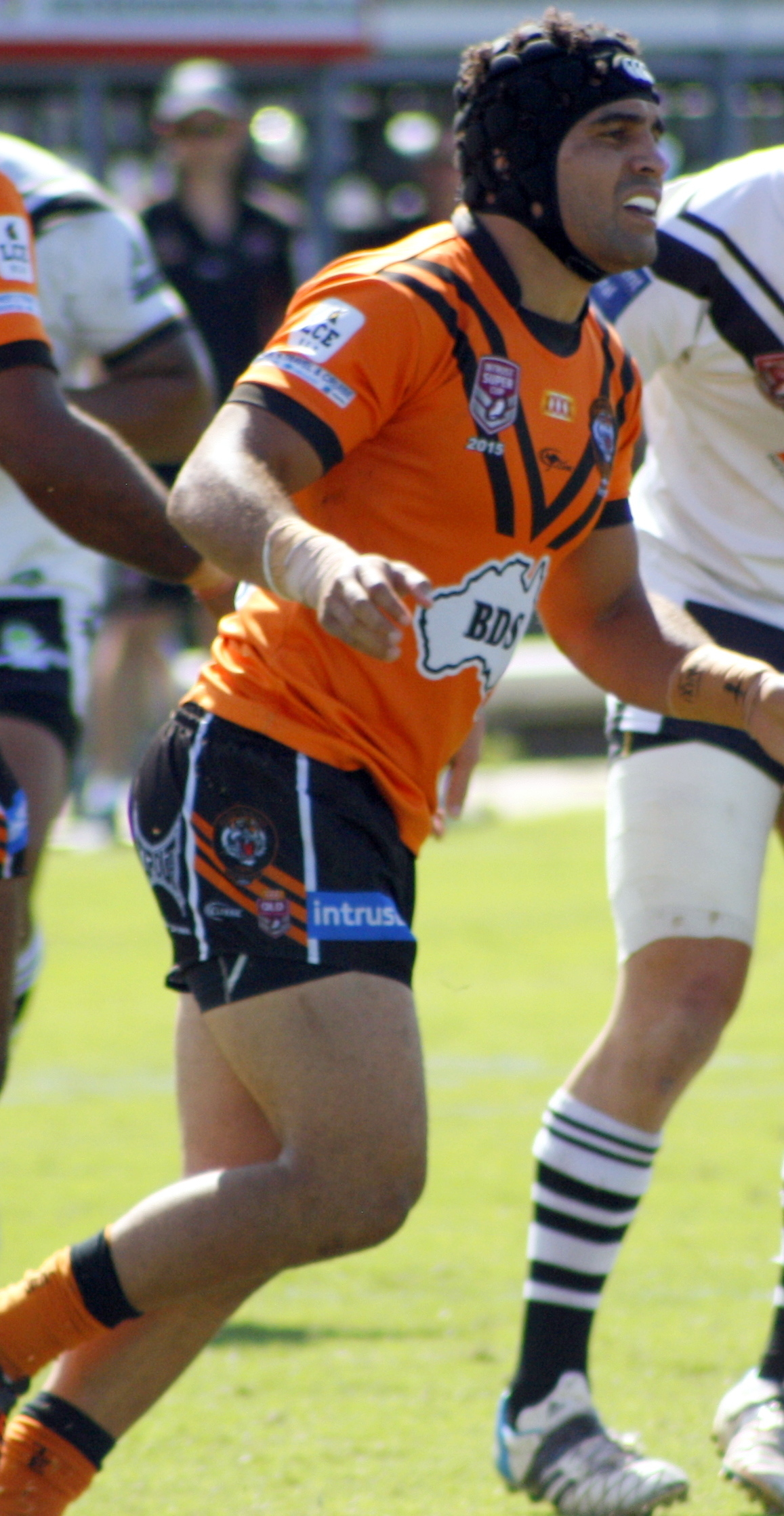

Personal information
- Born: 16 April 1988 (age 38) Alotau, Papua New Guinea
- Height: 1.75 m (5 ft 9 in)
- Weight: 78 kg (12 st 4 lb)

Playing information
- Position: Hooker
Club
Years	Team	Pld	T	G	FG	P
2021	PNG Hunters	2	0	0	0	0
Representative
Years	Team	Pld	T	G	FG	P
2007	Papua New Guinea
2009–18	PNG Prime Minister's XIII	2	0	0	0	0
2015	Queensland Residents	1	0	0	0	0
- Source: As of 6 January 2024

Tommy Butterfield (born 16 April 1988) is a Papua New Guinean professional rugby league footballer who played for the PNG Hunters and Brisbane Tigers as a hooker in the Queensland Cup .He is a Papua New Guinea international and was previously contracted to the Brisbane Broncos in the National Rugby League.

== Early years ==
Butterfield attended Redcliffe State High School and the University of the Sunshine Coast.

== Playing career ==
Butterfield was a Redcliffe Dolphins junior and played for the Easts Tigers in the Queensland Cup.

In 2012, he was approached by Whitehaven but the club failed to get Rugby Football League approval.

== Representative career ==
Butterfield toured Europe with Papua New Guinea in 2007. He was named in the Papua New Guinea training squad for the 2008 World Cup, but did not make the final squad.

In 2009 he played for PNG against Australia's Prime Minister's XIII.

In 2010 he played for Australian Universities Rugby League when they toured England and France.
