= Brad Davis (rugby league, born 1982) =

Australian rugby league footballer

Personal information
- Born: 30 April 1982 (age 44) Werris Creek, New South Wales, Australia
- Height: 181 cm (5 ft 11 in)
- Weight: 84 kg (13 st 3 lb)

Playing information
- Position: Halfback
Club
Years	Team	Pld	T	G	FG	P
2008	Gold Coast Titans	6	0	0	0	0
Representative
Years	Team	Pld	T	G	FG	P
2008–11	Queensland Residents	3	1	2	0	8
- Source: As of 5 January 2024

Brad Davis (born 30 April 1982) is a rugby league footballer who previously played for the Gold Coast Titans in the National Rugby League. He played as a half-back.

== Early life ==
Davis grew up in Werris Creek NSW. He participated in many Catholic School Representative teams and other schoolboy football teams.

== Playing career ==
In 2007 Davis helped the Tweed Heads Seagulls become the first NSW based team to win the Queensland Cup, winning the inaugural Duncal Hall Medal for man-of-the-match in the grand final.

Davis made his National Rugby League debut in 2008, playing in six matches for the Gold Coast Titans.

Davis is the Tweed Heads Seagulls leading points scorer of all time. He scored a total of 677 points in 92 games for the club in the Queensland Cup.

== Post career ==
Davis coaches a Palm Beach Currumbin Sports High rugby league team. He is currently the Transition Coach for the Gold Coast Titans.
