= Liam Georgetown =

Australian rugby league footballer (born 1985)

Personal information
- Full name: Liam Georgetown
- Born: 27 April 1985 (age 41) Cherbourg, Queensland, Australia

Playing information
- Height: 184 cm (6 ft 0 in)
- Weight: 94 kg (14 st 11 lb)
- Position: Fullback, Wing
Club
Years	Team	Pld	T	G	FG	P
2007	Penrith Panthers	1	0	0	0	0
20??	Boston 13s		0	0	0	0
	Total	1	0	0	0	0
Representative
Years	Team	Pld	T	G	FG	P
2011–12	Queensland Residents	2	1	6	0	12
- Source: Liam Georgetown Rugby League Project

Liam Georgetown is an Australian former rugby league footballer who last played for the semi professional Boston 13s in the USA Rugby League. His position was usually on the wing or fullback.

Georgetown had previously played for the Penrith Panthers in the National Rugby League Also was contacted to the Brisbane Broncos top 30 on a trail & trail deal in 2013 and holds the record for the most points at the Redcliffe Dolphins in the Queensland Cup.
