= Nathanael Barnes =

Australian rugby league footballer

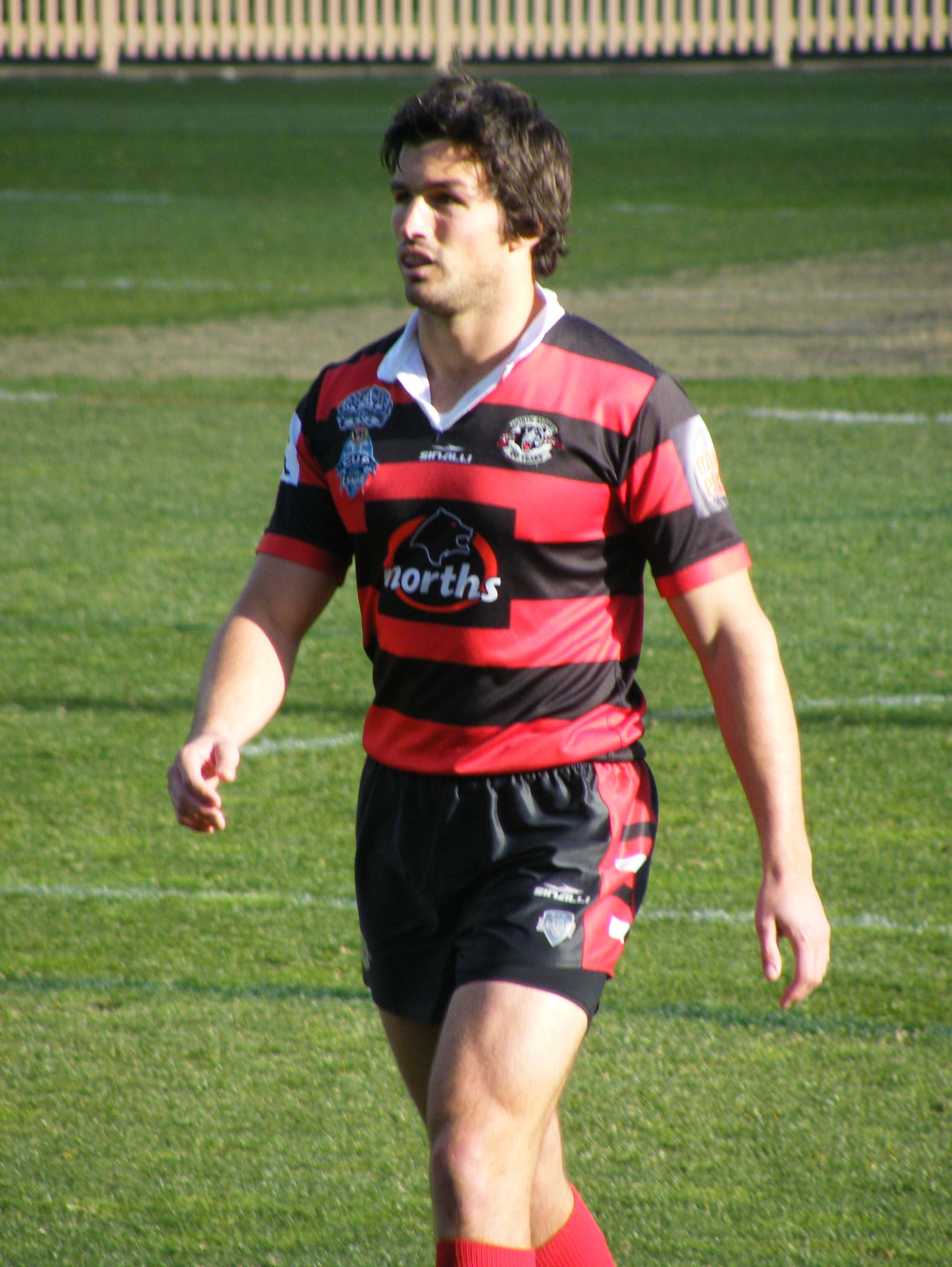

Personal information
- Full name: Nathanael Barnes
- Born: 11 October 1982 (age 43)

Playing information
- Position: Wing
Club
Years	Team	Pld	T	G	FG	P
	Tweed Heads Seagulls	92	73	0	0	292
Representative
Years	Team	Pld	T	G	FG	P
2012	Queensland Residents	1	2	0	0	8
- As of 5 January 2024

Nathanael Barnes (born 11 October 1987) is an Australian rugby league footballer.

Barnes is the Tweed Heads Seagulls leading try scorer of all time. He scored a total of 73 tries in 92 games for the club in the Queensland Cup.

In 2012 he was named in the Queensland Residents side.

In 2012, he played for the Wynnum Manly Seagulls and trialled for the Brisbane Broncos, before joining the North Sydney Bears in the New South Wales Cup. He then returned to Tweed Heads Seagulls.
