= Aaron Whitchurch =

Australian rugby league footballer

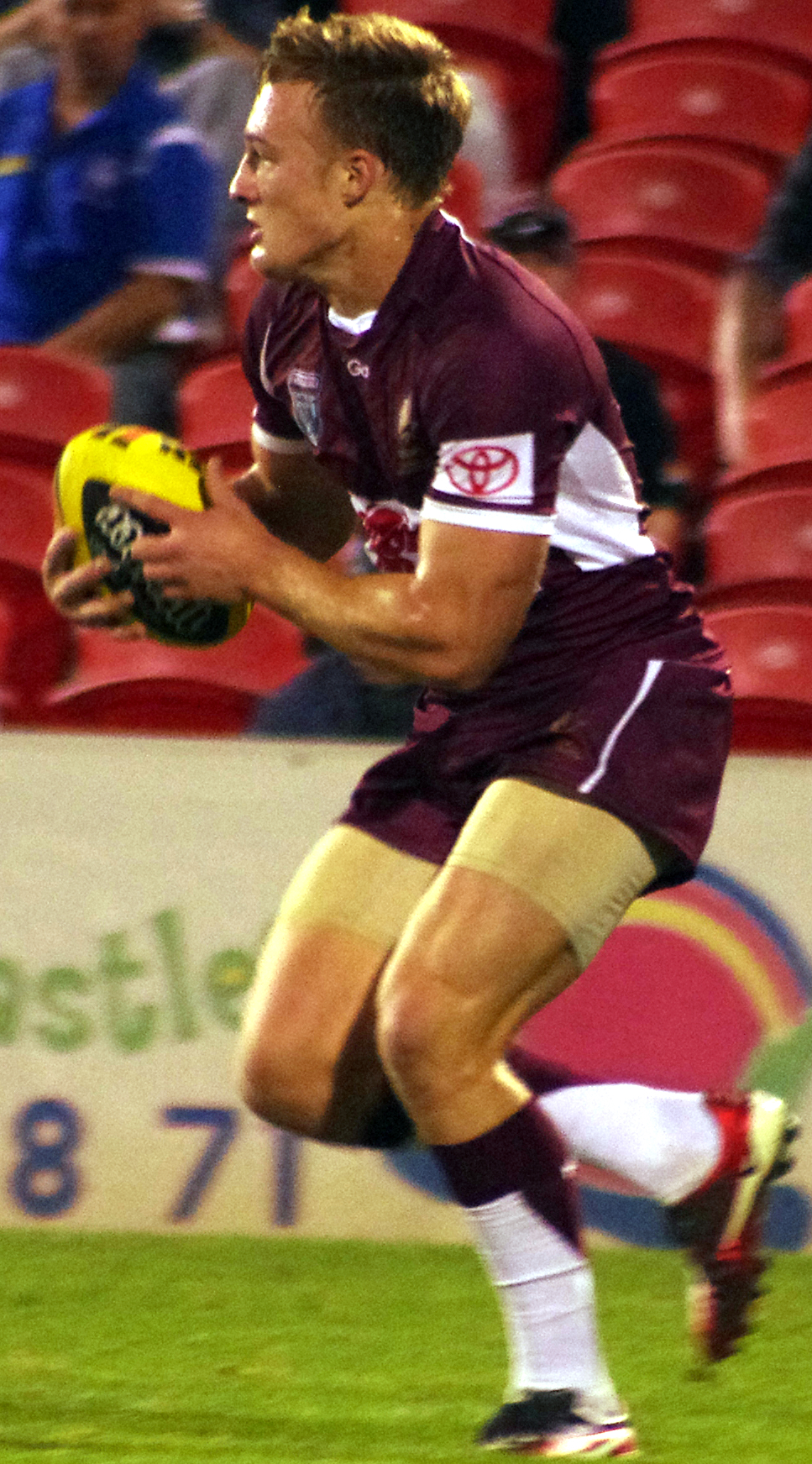

Personal information
- Born: 3 May 1992 (age 34) Fremantle, Western Australia, Australia
- Height: 186 cm (6 ft 1 in)
- Weight: 97 kg (15 st 4 lb)

Playing information
- Position: Centre, Second-row
Club
Years	Team	Pld	T	G	FG	P
2012–15	Brisbane Broncos	5	1	0	0	4
Representative
Years	Team	Pld	T	G	FG	P
2014–16	Queensland Residents	3	0	0	0	0
- Source: As of 6 January 2024

Aaron Whitchurch (born 3 May 1992) is an Australian professional rugby league footballer who most recently played for the Brisbane Broncos in the National Rugby League. He plays as a centre and second-row.

== Playing career ==
Born in Fremantle, Western Australia. Whitchurch moved to Queensland at age eight, playing in his first junior football team with the Stanley River Wolves before being signed by the Brisbane Broncos. Whitchurch played for the Broncos' NYC team from 2010 to 2012, scoring 13 tries in 36 games.

In February 2012, Whitchurch's Brisbane Broncos coach, Anthony Griffin, revealed that Whitchurch's future was in the forwards due to his strength and speed.

In Round 17 of the 2012 NRL season, Whitchurch made his NRL debut for the Broncos against the Cronulla-Sutherland Sharks. He scored a try on debut.

== Representative career ==
In 2012, Whitchurch was named at wing in the inaugural Under 20's State of Origin match for Queensland.
