= Ipswich Jets =

Australian rugby league club, based in Ipswich, QLD

Club information
- Full name: Ipswich Jets Rugby League Football Club
- Nickname: Jets
- Colours: Green; Gold; White
- Founded: 1982; 44 years ago
- Website: ipswichjets.com.au

Current details
- Ground: North Ipswich Reserve (5,500)
- CEO: Richard Hughes
- Coach: Tye Ingebrigtsen
- Captain: Nathaniel Neale
- Competition: Queensland Cup
- 2024: 14th

Records
- Premierships: 1
- Runners-up: 2 (1988, 1989)
- Wooden spoons: 1 (1992)
- Premierships (2nd grade): 1 (2015)
- Runners-up (2nd grade): 2 (2002, 2008)
- Wooden spoons (2nd grade): 3 (2006, 2010, 2023)
- Premierships (3rd grade): 0
- Runners-up (3rd grade): 2 (2007, 2016)
- Most capped: 258 – Danny Coburn
- Highest points scorer: 594 – Marmin Barba, Steven West

The Ipswich Jets are an Australian rugby league football club based in Ipswich, Queensland. Their name comes from nearby RAAF Base Amberley, one of the largest airbases in Australia. The Jets compete in the Queensland Cup competition. Originally in the 1980s their colours were green and white, but in recent years gold has been added to the combination.

== History ==
Ipswich were one of the earliest teams to join the Queensland Rugby League after it was founded as the Queensland Amateur Rugby Football League in 1909. Ipswich even contested two of the QARFL's first three grand finals, winning the title in its first year in the competition in 1910. But a long absence from the competition started shortly thereafter, and Ipswich was not represented in Queensland's top league again until the mid-1980s.

From 1982 to 1985, an Ipswich representative team competed in the statewide comps. The following year, an Ipswich team was introduced to the Brisbane Rugby League premiership. They were coached in the 1980s by legendary Australian halfback Tommy Raudonikis. The team's most famous product was Allan Langer, who in 1987 was selected to play halfback for the Queensland State of Origin team while playing for the Jets in the Brisbane Rugby League premiership, even though he was not as yet playing in the New South Wales Rugby League's Winfield Cup which was, at that time, fast becoming the premier rugby league competition in the world.

Kerrod and Kevin Walters also played for the club with Langer in their early years. When all three played together for the Brisbane Broncos later, they were dubbed "the Ipswich connection". Kevin later returned to coach the Queensland Cup side in the mid-2000s before moving to Europe to coach in the Super League. Their brother, Steve Walters, played originally for Booval Swifts in the Ipswich Rugby League.

The Jets reached the Grand Finals of the 1988 and 1989 Brisbane Rugby League premiership.

Ipswich continued playing in the Queensland Cup when it was founded in 1997. In the 2007 Queensland Cup, the Jets caused a surprise by upsetting many of their more fancied rivals and pressing for a semi-finals spot, when they had been predicted by most tipsters to finish last.

At the end of the 2008 Queensland Cup preliminary rounds, Ipswich finished four points clear at the top of the ladder, winning their first-ever Queensland Cup minor premiership. As Kevin Walters moved to Europe to pursue a career coaching in the Super League, his assistant and former teammate at both the Canberra Raiders and the Broncos, Glenn Lazarus, was promoted to head coach.

Brothers Ben and Shane Walker who assisted Lazarus in 2009 and 2010 have been appointed co-head coaches in 2011, 2012 and again in 2013. Shane played 149 games for the Broncos and South Sydney from 1996 to 2006, while Ben 135 NRL games for Brisbane, Northern Eagles, Manly Sea Eagles and South Sydney between 1995 and 2006, as well as 44 games for the London Broncos (1995–96) and the Leeds Rhinos (2002). Ben was the NRL's leading point scorer in 2001 when he scored 279 points (18 tries, 103 goals and 1 field goal) in his only season with the Northern Eagles.

In 2020, after nine seasons in charge, the Walker brothers left the club. They were replaced by former Jets' captain Keiron Lander.

== NRL bid ==
In 2010 the Jets announced they will be part of a bid for a license in an expanded National Rugby League. After a prolonged saga, they ultimately lost out to The Dolphins. By the mid 2020's, the success of the Dolphins coupled with the population growth across South East Queensland ahead of the Brisbane 2032 Olympics led to renewed calls for the Jets to be named as an expansion team.

== Club Identity ==
Year	Kit Manufacturer	Major Sponsor	Back Top Sponsor	Sleeve Sponsor	Back Bottom Sponsor	Chest Sponsor	Collar Sponsor
2020	Dynasty Sport	Jets Leagues Club					
2022	Struddys	Savage Pest Control		Harvey Norman, Savage Pest Control, Savco		Llewellyn Motors, Jets Leagues Club	
2023	Struddys	TAE Aerospace		Harvey Norman, Savage Pest Control, Savco		Llewellyn Motors, Jets Leagues Club	
2024	Struddys	TAE Aerospace		Savco, Harvey Norman, The iCare Group		Llewellyn Motors, Jets Leagues Club	Ipswich City Council
2025	Struddys	TAE Aerospace		Savco, Harvey Norman, The iCare Group, Hoyts	Strud Property	Higgins, Lyndons	Ipswich City Council
2026	Struddys	The iCare Group Australia	ACS Group	Higgins, Hoyts, Savco, TAE Aerospace	Strud Property	Lyndons, AVS Security	Ipswich City Council
2027	Struddys	The iCare Group Australia	ACS Group	Higgins, Hoyts, Savco, TAE Aerospace	Strud Property	Lyndons, AVS Security	Ipswich City Council

== Results ==
=== Brisbane Rugby League premiership ===
- 1986: 8th
- 1987: 6th
- 1988: Runners-up
- 1989: Runners-up
- 1990: 7th
- 1991: 6th
- 1992: 10th (last)
- 1993: Semi finalists
- 1994: Semi finalists
- 1995: 8th
- 1996: Eliminated in preliminary rounds

=== Queensland Cup ===
- 1997: 13th
- 1998: 13th
- 1999: 10th
- 2000: 6th
- 2001: 8th
- 2002: Runners-up
- 2003: Semi finalists
- 2004: 10th
- 2005: 9th
- 2006: 9th
- 2007: Semi finalists
- 2008: Runners-up
- 2009: 8th
- 2010: 12th
- 2011: 5th
- 2012: 5th
- 2013: 5th
- 2014: 5th
- 2015: 3rd (Premiers)
- 2016: 7th
- 2017: 7th
- 2018: 6th
- 2019: 9th

== Honours ==
- Premiers 2015
- Runners Up 2002, 2008
- Minor Premiers 2008

== Records ==
=== Queensland Cup ===
Most Games for Club

- 258, Danny Coburn
- 192, Tyson Lofipo
- 154, Brendon Marshall
- 150, Nathaniel Neale
- 138, Sam Martin

Most Points for Club

- 594, Marmin Barba
- 594, Steven West
- 505, Wes Conlon
- 474, Brendon Lindsay
- 408, Donald Malone

Most Tries for Club

- 79, Marmin Barba
- 67, Donald Malone
- 66, Michael Purclel
- 64, Ricky Bird
- 59, Brendon Marshall

== See also ==
- National Rugby League reserves affiliations
