= 2016 NRL State Championship =

Rugby League match

Illawarra Cutters	Burleigh Bears
54	12
	1	2	Total
ILL	30	24	54
BUR	0	12	12
- Date: 2 October 2016
- Stadium: ANZ Stadium
- Location: Sydney, New South Wales, Australia
- Player of the Match: Drew Hutchison
- Referees: Peter Gough, Jon Stone

Broadcast partners
- Broadcasters: Nine Network
- Commentators: Mathew Thompson; Brad Fittler; Scott Sattler

The 2016 NRL State Championship was a Rugby League match held between the winners of the 2016 Intrust Super Premiership NSW and the 2016 Queensland Cup. It was the third edition following the 2015 NRL State Championship, and was played before the 2016 NRL Grand Final.

== Background ==
For the 2015 NRL State Championship, the Illawarra Cutters won the NSW Cup by defeating the minor premiers Mount Pritchard Mounties 21–20 in the Grand Final. The Burleigh Bears won the QLD Cup by defeating the Redcliffe Dolphins 26–16 in the Grand Final.

== Teams ==
Team details
Illawarra Cutters		Position	Burleigh Bears
Name	Number	Position	Number	Name
Adam Quinlan	1	FB	1	Kurtis Rowe
Kurt Mann	2	WG	2	Waka Wanahi
Taane Milne	3	CE	3	Sami Sauiluma
Levi Dodd	4	CE	4	Connor Broadhurst
Kalifa Faifai Loa	5	WG	5	Oliver Regan
Shaun Nona	6	FE	6	Cameron Cullen
Drew Hutchison	7	HB	7	Jamal Fogarty
Shannon Wakeman	8	PR	8	Luke Page
Josh McCrone	9	HK	9	Pat Politoni
Jacob Host	10	PF	22	Nathaniel Peteru
Damian Sironen	15	SR	14	Parahi Wilson
Chris Lewis	12	SR	12	Hayden Schwass
Siliva Havili	13	LK	13	Lachlan Burr
Tyrone McCarthy	11	IN	10	Paterika Vaivai
Sam Coster	14	IN	15	Jeff Lynch
Jay Gallagher	16	IN	17	Louis Fanene
Sam Clune	19	IN	20	Josh Ailaomai
Jason Demetriou		Coach		Jim Lenihan
NRL.com

== Match details ==
2016 NRL State Championship

Sunday, 2 October
15:40 AEDT (UTC+11)

Illawarra Cutters	54 – 12	Burleigh Bears
Tries: 9 Wakeman 7'; Sironen 23'; Quinlan 26'; Host 32'; Lewis 37'; Hutchinson 44'; Havili 53'; Mann 57'; Milne 63'; Goals: 9 Nona 8', 24', 33', 39', 47', 55', 58', 65' (9/9)	1st: 30–0; 2nd: 24–12; Report	Tries: 2 Ailaomai 61'; Row 80'; Goals: 2 Fogarty 61' (1/1); Page 80' (1/1)

ANZ Stadium, Sydney
Referees: Peter Gough, Jon Stone
Player of the Match: Drew Hutchison (Illawarra)

== See also ==
- 2016 New South Wales Cup season
- 2016 Queensland Cup season
