= 2016 Queensland Cup =

Rugby competition in Queensland, Australia

- Duration: March 5 – September 25, 2016
- Teams: 14
- Premiers: Burleigh Bears (3rd title)
- Minor premiers: Redcliffe Dolphins (5th title)
- Matches played: 167
- Points scored: 8,020
- Top points scorer: Darren Nicholls (258)
- Player of the year: Josh Chudleigh (Courier Mail Medal)
- Top try-scorer: Jonathon Reuben (18)

The 2016 Queensland Cup season was the 21st season the top-level statewide rugby league competition run in Queensland, Australia, by the Queensland Rugby League. The competition, known as the Intrust Super Cup due to sponsorship from Intrust Super, featured 14 teams playing a 29-week long season (including finals) from March to September.

The Burleigh Bears won their third premiership after defeating the Burleigh Bears 26–16 in the Grand Final at Suncorp Stadium. Mackay Cutters' hooker Josh Chudleigh was named the competition's Player of the Year, winning the Courier Mail Medal.

== Teams ==
In 2016, the lineup of teams remained unchanged for the second consecutive year.

Colours	Club	Home ground(s)	Head coach(s)	Captain(s)	NRL Affiliate
	Burleigh Bears	Pizzey Park	Jim Lenihan	Jamal Fogarty	Gold Coast Titans
	Central Queensland Capras	Browne Park	Kim Williams	Gavin Hiscox	None
	Easts Tigers	Suzuki Stadium	Scott Sipple	Dane Hogan	Melbourne Storm
	Ipswich Jets	North Ipswich Reserve	Ben & Shane Walker	Dane Phillips	Brisbane Broncos
	Mackay Cutters	Virgin Australia Stadium	David Simpson → Jim Wilson	Brenden Treston	North Queensland Cowboys
	Northern Pride	Barlow Park	Joe O'Callaghan	Ryan Ghietti	North Queensland Cowboys
	Norths Devils	Bishop Park	Mark Gliddon	Billy Brittain	Brisbane Broncos
	Papua New Guinea Hunters	National Football Stadium	Michael Marum	Noel Zeming	None
	Redcliffe Dolphins	Dolphin Oval	Adam Mogg	Sam Anderson	Brisbane Broncos
	Souths Logan Magpies	Davies Park	Josh Hannay	Phil Dennis	Brisbane Broncos
	Sunshine Coast Falcons	Sunshine Coast Stadium	Craig Ingebrigtsen	Troy Giess	Melbourne Storm
	Townsville Blackhawks	Jack Manski Oval	Kristian Woolf	Glenn Hall & Anthony Mitchell	North Queensland Cowboys
	Tweed Heads Seagulls	Piggabeen Sports Complex	Aaron Zimmerle	James Wood	Gold Coast Titans
	Wynnum Manly Seagulls	BMD Kougari Oval	Jon Buchanan	Patrick Templeman	Brisbane Broncos

== Ladder ==
2016 Queensland Cup
Pos	Team	Pld	W	D	L	B	PF	PA	PD	Pts
1	Redcliffe Dolphins	23	18	0	5	2	728	345	+383	40
2	Burleigh Bears (P)	23	17	1	5	2	680	497	+183	39
3	Townsville Blackhawks	23	16	1	6	2	694	403	+291	37
4	Papua New Guinea Hunters	23	15	0	8	2	541	421	+120	34
5	Sunshine Coast Falcons	23	12	1	10	2	501	462	+39	29
6	Easts Tigers	23	11	2	10	2	563	520	+43	28
7	Souths Logan Magpies	23	11	2	10	2	587	590	-3	28
8	Northern Pride	23	11	0	12	2	516	495	+21	26
9	Ipswich Jets	23	11	0	12	2	562	555	+7	26
10	Wynnum Manly Seagulls	23	10	0	13	2	547	561	-14	24
11	Norths Devils	23	8	1	14	2	532	686	-154	21
12	Central Queensland Capras	23	6	1	16	2	440	756	-316	17
13	Tweed Heads Seagulls	23	6	0	17	2	393	728	-335	16
14	Mackay Cutters	23	4	1	18	2	468	733	-265	13

== Final series ==
Home	Score	Away	Match Information
Home	Score	Away	Date and Time (Local)	Venue
Elimination Finals
Townsville Blackhawks	46 – 4	Easts Tigers	4 September 2016, 1:40 pm	Jack Manski Oval
PNG Hunters	12 – 18	Sunshine Coast Falcons	4 September 2016, 3:00 pm	National Football Stadium
Major / Minor Semi-final
Townsville Blackhawks	10 – 18	Sunshine Coast Falcons	10 September 2016, 4:00 pm	Jack Manski Oval
Redcliffe Dolphins	24 – 40	Burleigh Bears	11 September 2016, 1:40 pm	Dolphin Oval
Preliminary Final
Redcliffe Dolphins	38 – 16	Sunshine Coast Falcons	18 September 2016, 2:30 pm	Dolphin Oval
Grand Final
Burleigh Bears	26 – 16	Redcliffe Dolphins	25 September 2016, 3:55 pm	Suncorp Stadium

Qualifying / Elimination Finals
3	Townsville	46
6	Easts	4
4	PNG Hunters	12
5	Sunshine Coast	18

Major / Minor Semi-finals
1	Redcliffe	24
2	Burleigh	40
3	Townsville	10
5	Sunshine Coast	18

Preliminary Final
1	Redcliffe	38
5	Sunshine Coast	16

Grand Final
2	Burleigh	26
1	Redcliffe	16

== Grand Final ==
Burleigh returned to the finals for the first time in 11 years after finishing the regular season in second. After their first week bye, they defeated Redcliffe 40–24 in the major semi final to qualify for their fifth Grand Final, their first since 2005. Redcliffe finished the regular season as minor premiers and qualified for the finals for the first time since 2012. After losing to Burleigh in the major semi final, they defeated the Sunshine Coast Falcons in the preliminary final and booked a spot in their tenth Grand Final, their third against Burleigh.

=== Teams ===
Team details
Burleigh Bears		Position	Redcliffe Dolphins
Name	Number	Position	Number	Name
Kurtis Rowe	1	Fullback	1	Jack Ahearn
Waka Wanahi	2	Wing	24	Jonus Pearson
Sami Sauiluma	15	Centre	3	Daniel Randall
Connor Broadhurst	4	Centre	4	Joseph Bradley
Oliver Regan	5	Wing	5	Curtis Johnston
Cameron Cullen	6	Five eighth	6	Zach Strasser
Jamal Fogarty (c)	7	Half back	7	Darren Nicholls
Luke Page	8	Prop forward	8	Sam Anderson (c)
Pat Politoni	9	Hooker	9	Shane Pumipi
Paterika Vaivai	10	Prop forward	10	Charlie Fainga'a
Jamie Dowling	21	Second row	11	Aaron Whitchurch
Hayden Schwass	12	Second row	12	Daniel Bridge
Lachlan Burr	13	Lock forward	13	Chris Gesch
Louis Fanene	17	Interchange	15	Brandon Lee
Josh Ailaomai	20	Interchange	20	Taylor Brown
Nathaniel Peteru	22	Interchange	23	Tyson Cleal
Jeff Lynch	24	Interchange	25	Christian Hazard
Jim Lenihan		Coach		Adam Mogg
QRL

=== Scoreboard ===
2016 Intrust Super Cup Grand Final

Sunday, 25 September
15:55 (AEST) (UTC+10)

Burleigh Bears	26 – 16	Redcliffe Dolphins
Tries: 4 Rowe 12', 23'; Sauiluma 49'; Cullen 71'; Goals: 5 Fogarty 14', 24', pen 28', 50', 73' (5/5)	1st: 14–10; 2nd: 12–6; Report Archived 2016-10-04 at the Wayback Machine	Tries: 3 Pearson 16'; Cleal 33'; Nicholls 57'; Goals: 2 Nicholls 34', 59' (2/3)

Suncorp Stadium, Brisbane
Attendance: 6,611
Referees: Peter Gough, Jarrod Cole
Duncan Hall Medal: Cameron Cullen (Burleigh)

=== First half ===
Burleigh got the scoring underway in the 12th minute when fullback Kurtis Rowe sliced through the Dolphins' defence and ran 35 metres to score. It took just four minutes for Redcliffe to hit back when winger Jonus Pearson scored following some slick offloading close to the line. In the 23rd minute, Rowe recorded his second try of the contest when he muscled his way over to extended Burleigh's lead to eight. A penalty goal converted from right in front pushed the Bears' lead to 10 before Redcliffe scored through Tyson Cleal to cut margin to four in the 33rd minute.

=== Second half ===
The Bears again scored the first points of the half, this time through centre Sami Sauiluma in the 49th minute. Halfback Jamal Fogarty converted the try from out wide to give Burleigh a 10-point lead. The Dolphins got back into the game in the 57th minute thanks to a try to halfback Darren Nicholls, as they trailed by just four points. In the 71st minute, the Bears sealed the win when five-eighth Cameron Cullen scored and gave his side an unassailable 10-point lead. The victory was Burleigh's third Grand Final triumph, making them the second most successful club in the competition. Cullen was awarded the Duncan Hall Medal for man of the match for his performance.

== NRL State Championship ==
After winning the Grand Final, the Burleigh Bears qualified for the NRL State Championship on NRL Grand Final day. They were defeated by the Illawarra Cutters, the New South Wales Cup premiers, 54–12.

2016 NRL State Championship

Sunday, 2 October
15:40 AEDT (UTC+11)

Illawarra Cutters	54 – 12	Burleigh Bears
Tries: 9 Wakeman 7'; Sironen 23'; Quinlan 26'; Host 32'; Lewis 37'; Hutchinson 44'; Havili 53'; Mann 57'; Milne 63'; Goals: 9 Nona 8', 24', 33', 39', 47', 55', 58', 65' (9/9)	1st: 30–0; 2nd: 24–12; Report	Tries: 2 Ailaomai 61'; Row 80'; Goals: 2 Fogarty 61' (1/1); Page 80' (1/1)

ANZ Stadium, Sydney
Referees: Peter Gough, Jon Stone
Player of the Match: Drew Hutchison (Illawarra)

Team details
Illawarra Cutters		Position	Burleigh Bears
Name	Number	Position	Number	Name
Adam Quinlan	1	FB	1	Kurtis Rowe
Kurt Mann	2	WG	2	Waka Wanahi
Taane Milne	3	CE	3	Sami Sauiluma
Levi Dodd	4	CE	4	Connor Broadhurst
Kalifa Faifai Loa	5	WG	5	Oliver Regan
Shaun Nona	6	FE	6	Cameron Cullen
Drew Hutchison	7	HB	7	Jamal Fogarty
Shannon Wakeman	8	PR	8	Luke Page
Josh McCrone	9	HK	9	Pat Politoni
Jacob Host	10	PF	22	Nathaniel Peteru
Damian Sironen	15	SR	14	Parahi Wilson
Chris Lewis	12	SR	12	Hayden Schwass
Siliva Havili	13	LK	13	Lachlan Burr
Tyrone McCarthy	11	IN	10	Paterika Vaivai
Sam Coster	14	IN	15	Jeff Lynch
Jay Gallagher	16	IN	17	Louis Fanene
Sam Clune	19	IN	20	Josh Ailaomai
Jason Demetriou		Coach		Jim Lenihan
NRL.com

== Player statistics ==
The following statistics are as of the conclusion of the season (including finals).

=== Leading try scorers ===
Pos	Player	Team	Tries
1	Jonathon Reuben	Townsville Blackhawks	20
1	Kurtis Rowe	Burleigh Bears	20
3	Ryley Jacks	Sunshine Coast Falcons	19
4	Jonus Pearson	Redcliffe Dolphins	16
4	Daniel Ogden	Wynnum Manly Seagulls	16
6	Zach Strasser	Redcliffe Dolphins	15
6	Mosese Pangai	Townsville Blackhawks	15
6	Delouise Hoeter	Townsville Blackhawks	15
9	Patrick Templeman	Wynnum Manly Seagulls	14
9	Justin Olam	PNG Hunters	14

=== Leading point scorers ===
Pos	Player	Team	T	G	FG	Pts
1	Darren Nicholls	Redcliffe Dolphins	11	115	-	274
2	Jamal Fogarty	Burleigh Bears	12	111	-	270
3	Khan Ahwang	Northern Pride	13	77	-	206
4	Todd Murphy	Norths Devils	12	69	-	186
5	Liam Taylor	Mackay Cutters	12	58	-	164
6	Billy Walters	Easts Tigers	8	58	-	148
7	Matt Seamark	Wynnum Manly Seagulls	0	63	1	127
8	Noel Zeming	PNG Hunters	6	50	-	124
9	Kyle Laybutt	Townsville Blackhawks	7	47	-	122
10	Joe Stimson	Sunshine Coast Falcons	5	39	-	98

== QRL awards ==
- Courier Mail Medal (Best and Fairest): Josh Chudleigh ( Mackay Cutters)
- Coach of the Year: Jim Lenihan ( Burleigh Bears)
- Rookie of the Year: Jonus Pearson ( Redcliffe Dolphins)
- Representative Player of the Year: Jai Arrow ( Queensland Residents, Norths Devils)
- XXXX People's Choice Award: Justin Olam ( PNG Hunters)

=== Team of the Year ===
Position	Nat	Winner	Club
Fullback	(New Zealand)	Jahrome Hughes	Townsville Blackhawks
Wing	(Australia)	Jonus Pearson	Redcliffe Dolphins
Centre	(Tonga)	Mosese Pangai	Townsville Blackhawks
Five-eighth	(Australia)	Cameron Cullen	Burleigh Bears
Halfback	(Australia)	Jamal Fogarty	Burleigh Bears
Prop	(Australia)	Sam Anderson	Redcliffe Dolphins
Hooker	(Australia)	Josh Chudleigh	Mackay Cutters
Second-row	(Papua New Guinea)	Rhyse Martin	Townsville Blackhawks
Lock	(Australia)	Jai Arrow	Norths Devils

== See also ==
- Queensland Cup
- Queensland Rugby League
