= 2016 NRL Grand Final =

Championship game of the National Rugby League season

Melbourne Storm	Cronulla-Sutherland Sharks
12	14
	1	2	Total
MEL	0	12	12
CRO	8	6	14
- Date: 2 October 2016
- Stadium: ANZ Stadium
- Location: Sydney, New South Wales, Australia
- Clive Churchill Medal: Luke Lewis
- Australian National anthem: Dami Im
- Referee: Matt Cecchin; Ben Cummins; Jeff Younis (touch judge); Brett Suttor (touch judge)
- Attendance: 83,625

Broadcast partners
- Broadcasters: Nine Network (live) Fox Sports (delayed)
- Commentators: Ray Warren Peter Sterling Phil Gould Brad Fittler (sideline) Darren Lockyer (sideline) Yvonne Sampson (host) Andrew Johns (analysis) Wally Lewis (analysis) Billy Slater (analysis)

The 2016 NRL Grand Final was a rugby league match between the Melbourne Storm and the Cronulla-Sutherland Sharks to determine the premiers of the National Rugby League for the 2016 season. The match was held at Sydney's ANZ Stadium on Sunday 2 October. Cronulla-Sutherland won the match 14–12 in a tight contest before 83,625 spectators, earning the club its first premiership title in their 50-year history. They also became the last of nine Sydney-based teams to win a premiership. Cronulla forward Luke Lewis was awarded the Clive Churchill Medal as the best player on ground.

The match was preceded by the 2016 National Youth Competition Grand Final and the 2016 NRL State Championship. Pre-match entertainment was headlined by Keith Urban and former Bon Jovi guitarist Richie Sambora with Orianthi. The match was broadcast live throughout in Australia by the Nine Network.

== Background ==
The Melbourne Storm qualified for their sixth grand final in ten years after appearing in the 2006, 2007, 2008, 2009 and 2012 deciders, although their only recognised premiership was in 2012 after their 2007 and 2009 titles were withheld due to systemic salary cap breaches. Only coach Craig Bellamy and halfback Cooper Cronk have been involved on each occasion. The Cronulla-Sutherland Sharks had never won a grand final in the club's preceding 50 seasons, with their last grand final appearance in a unified competition being in 1978 when they lost to the Manly Warringah Sea Eagles through a grand final replay. Cronulla-Sutherland had also appeared in the 1997 Super League grand final, losing to the Brisbane Broncos. The last time Melbourne and Cronulla had faced each other in a finals series was in 2008 when Melbourne denied Cronulla with a decisive 28–0 win to claim a spot against the Manly-Warringah Sea Eagles in the grand final.

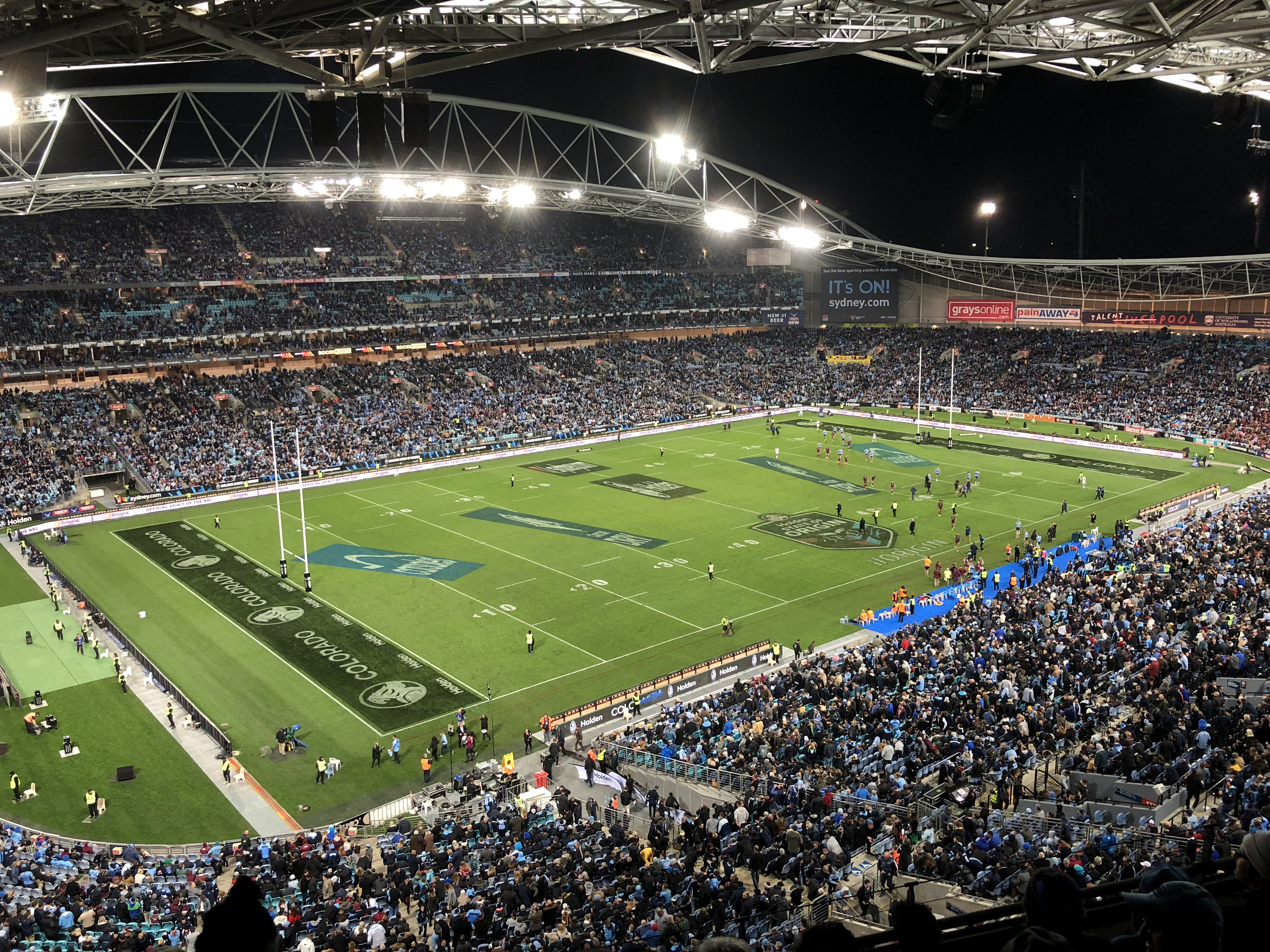
ANZ Stadium, where the match was played

=== 2016 season ===
==== Cronulla-Sutherland Sharks ====
The Sharks were coached by Shane Flanagan for the 5th season and captained by Paul Gallen. Heading into the season, expectations were high for Cronulla after their 2015 campaign and recruitment over the previous two seasons, which included Michael Ennis, James Maloney and Ben Barba, while bringing up Valentine Holmes from NSW Cup, all of whom were widely praised as the season progressed. Cronulla-Sutherland set the record for the longest winning streak in the club's history during the 2016 season, winning 15 games in a row from round 4 to round 20, whilst also breaking their previous best winning streak of 11 in a row.

Despite a slow start, losing two of their first three games of the season, which included losing to defending premiers the North Queensland Cowboys in round 1; a 14-6 win against the Storm at Shark Park in round 4, has been considered as the turning point of their season as it marked the start of their record-breaking winning streak. Cronulla emerged as one of four teams, along with the Storm, Cowboys and Broncos, with the most game wins when the season took a week off, after winning six games in a row. The performances from veteran players Ennis, Gallen and Luke Lewis playing arguably their best season of their careers, along with the right-side back row of Barba, Holmes and Jack Bird; as well as the form of Maloney contributing to the winning streak. By round 11, Cronulla were at the top of the table based on points differential, which was the first time for the club since round 2 in 2000.

Their 15-game winning streak came to an end in round 21, with an 18-18 draw against the Gold Coast Titans, which left them only one point ahead of the Storm. After the tie against the Titans, the momentum for the Sharks began to slow down, losing four of their last five games in the regular season.

Cronulla had used the least amount of players out of all NRL teams during the 2016 season, with only 24 players taking to the field throughout the season, despite fielding one of the oldest teams with many veteran players, with the lack of injuries attributing to their powerful form throughout the season.

==== Melbourne Storm ====
The Storm were captained by Cameron Smith and coached by Craig Bellamy. Storm fullback Billy Slater was ruled out for the season, after re-injuring his shoulder during their round 1 game against the Dragons and undergoing surgery, with Cameron Munster replacing him for the rest of the season. As the Storms injury toll began to grow, as Curtis Scott broke his leg during Round 2. Young Tonumaipea injuring his knee and Will Chambers breaking his foot, and sidelined for three months while in recovery, the Storm had used 11 different players in their back five positions in the first seven rounds, however they remained as one of the top four teams throughout their run of injuries.

In a twist to their season, round 7 saw the debut of future Fijian rugby union representative Suliasi Vunivalu, bought in to replace the injured Tonumaipea, with Vunivalu later solidifying his place in the permanent team line-up and became the seasons top try scorer.

From Vunivalu's debut game, until round 14, the Storm went on a seven-game winning streak. Like Cronulla, they, along with the Cowboys and Broncos, were level with the most wins when the game took a week off after round 9. After beating the Roosters 46-0 during round 14, which included Cameron Smith converting a goal after slipping on the field, considered a highlight of the regular season. Injuries would strike again when Munster injured his ankle in their round 15 and missed the next three rounds, with the Storm winning two of the three games until his return. Not long after Munster's injury, Nelson Asofa-Solomona injured his knee, and wouldn't be fit to return until round 22. Despite all of the issues with injuries, they were considered as the leading contenders alongside the injury-free Sharks moving into the second-half of the season. Bellamy's coaching was praised during this time period, as the Storm still sat in second place behind the Sharks at the end of round 19, with one of the worst rate of player injuries of any team that season.

They spent most of the season exchanging the minor premiership between themselves and the Sharks, like the Sharks they began to lose momentum towards the end of the regular season with surprise losses to the Raiders in round 24 and the Broncos at home in round 25, even though they were finally able to build somewhat full-strength sides.

The grand final marked the Melbourne Storm's 500th NRL game since it entered the competition in 1998.

==== Regular season match-ups ====
Melbourne and Cronulla met twice during the regular NRL season; in round 4 and round 26.

In round 4, the Cronulla side defeating Melbourne 14–6 to hand the Storm their first loss of the season; despite Sharks winger Holmes dropping the ball three times near the try line. The Storm's sole try coming from Felise Kaufusi finding a gap between the Sharks defensive line.

Round 26 was the last round of the regular season before the finals and the game between the two teams would determine who would finish 1st on the NRL ladder and claim the minor premiership, and took a completely different direction in comparison to their first meeting. Both teams had slowed down on form, making the game a crucial one for both teams to determine who would be the favourites heading into the finals series. Melbourne would go on to defeat Cronulla 26–6, after Melbourne leading 10-2 at half-time, with the Sharks lone try coming from Gerard Beale in the 69th minute. Due to the Canberra's victory in Round 26, this meant Cronulla was seeded third heading into the finals series.

=== Finals series ===
In their qualifying finals, Cronulla defeated the Canberra Raiders 16–14 at a capacity GIO Stadium in Canberra. During the game, coach Flanagan made the decision to pull Chad Townsend off during the second-half after a poor performance, which raised a lot of doubts in the Sharks form leading into the Preliminary Final.

The Storm defeated defending premiers the North Queensland Cowboys 16–10 at AAMI Park. As winners of their respective matches, both sides moved directly to the preliminary finals in the third week of the finals series.

In the preliminary finals, Cronulla defeated the Cowboys 32–20 at Allianz Stadium in Sydney to qualify for their first Grand Final since 1997 Super League, their first in a unified competition since 1978.

While the Melbourne side defeated Canberra 14–12 at AAMI Park to qualify for their sixth Grand Final since entering the competition in 1998, after a close game that was decided by Raiders winger Edrick Lee dropping the ball near the try line that would have sealed the game.

This meant that for the first time in NRL History, the two opposing State of Origin captains (Gallen for NSW, and Smith for QLD) would also be versing each other, as captains, in a Grand Final.

Cronulla-Sutherland Sharks route to the final
Round	Opposition	Score
QF	Canberra Raiders (A)	16-14
SF	Bye	
PF	North Queensland Cowboys (H/A)	32-20
Key: H = Home venue, A = Away venue, N = Neutral venue

Melbourne Storm's route to the final
Round	Opposition	Score
QF	North Queensland Cowboys (H)	16-10
SF	Bye	
PF	Canberra Raiders (H)	14-12
Key: H = Home venue, A = Away venue, N = Neutral venue

=== Final lead-up ===
The Sharks strength was their right-side back row attack with Barba, Holmes and Bird providing a challenge for teams to stop throughout the season, while the Storm's strength was their defence, conceding the least amount of points of all teams this season.

Each team had weaknesses that could affect their grand final performance. For the Sharks, it was their discipline, conceding one of the worst penalty rates of all NRL teams. For the Storm, it was their slow starts, as they had conceded the opening try in eight of their twelve games at home this season. The Sharks were missing Joseph Paulo, who was injured during the Round 26 clash against the Storm; while the Storm were missing Nelson Asofa-Solomona due to an elbow injury sustained in the sides 16-10 win in the Qualifying Final against the Cowboys.

Cooper Cronk was awarded the Dally M Medal for Player of the Year (along with Cowboys lock Jason Taumalolo), in a ceremony, days before the Grand Final took place.

Pundits, players and fans were equally split as to who would win the premiership, sighting the Sharks strength in attack and the Storms strength in defence. The only consensus was that the game would be close, with the only concern being whether Cronulla could mentally cope with the pressure of delivering the clubs long-awaited first premiership.

== Teams ==
Melbourne Storm halfback Cooper Cronk played in his sixth grand final after having featured in every premiership decider his club had reached since 2006. Cronk, Will Chambers, Cameron Smith, Jesse Bromwich, and Kevin Proctor were the last remaining members of their last premiership winning team in 2012. The Cronulla-Sutherland Sharks had six players with previous grand final experience in Luke Lewis (2003), Chris Heighington (2005), Matt Prior (2010), Ben Barba, Michael Ennis (both 2012), and James Maloney (2011 and 2013). Maloney was only the sixth player to contest three grand finals under different clubs after playing for the New Zealand Warriors and the Sydney Roosters in their previous grand final appearances. At age 35 with 278 first grade games, Sharks' captain Paul Gallen was the oldest and most experienced player to debut in a NRL grand final. The grand final would be Michael Ennis' last game before his retirement after playing 273 first grade games in the NRL.

This meant that only six players across both teams had played in all of their teams games for the season, Barba and Chad Townsend for Cronulla, and Dale Finucane, Jesse Bromwich, Kenny Bromwich and Tohu Harris for Melbourne.

Team details
Melbourne Storm		Position	Cronulla-Sutherland Sharks
Name	Number	Position	Number	Name
Cameron Munster	1	Fullback	1	Ben Barba
Suliasi Vunivalu	2	Wing	2	Sosaia Feki
Will Chambers	3	Centre	3	Jack Bird
Cheyse Blair	4	Centre	4	Ricky Leutele
Marika Koroibete	5	Wing	5	Valentine Holmes
Blake Green	6	Five eighth	6	James Maloney
Cooper Cronk	7	Half back	7	Chad Townsend
Jesse Bromwich	8	Prop forward	8	Andrew Fifita
Cameron Smith (c)	9	Hooker	9	Michael Ennis
Jordan McLean	10	Prop forward	10	Matt Prior
Kevin Proctor	11	Second row	11	Luke Lewis
Tohu Harris	12	Second row	12	Wade Graham
Dale Finucane	13	Lock forward	13	Paul Gallen (c)
Kenny Bromwich	14	Interchange	14	Gerard Beale
Tim Glasby	15	Interchange	15	Chris Heighington
Christian Welch	16	Interchange	16	Sam Tagataese
Ben Hampton	17	Interchange	17	Jayson Bukuya
Craig Bellamy		Coach		Shane Flanagan
RLP

=== Officials ===
Position			Stand-By
Referees:	Matt Cecchin	Ben Cummins	Gerard Sutton
Touch Judges:	Jeff Younis	Brett Suttor	Chris Butler
Senior Bunker:	Bernard Sutton		
Bunker Officials:	Ashley Klein	Luke Patten	

== Match summary ==
2016 NRL Grand Final

Sunday, 2 October
19:15 AEDT (UTC+11)

Melbourne Storm	12 – 14	Cronulla-Sutherland Sharks
Tries: 2 J Bromwich 50'; Chambers 64'; Goals: 2 Smith 51', 66' (2/2)	1st: 0–8; 2nd: 12–6; Report	Tries: 2 Barba 15'; Fifita 69'; Goals: 3 Maloney pen 8', 16', 71' (3/3)

ANZ Stadium, Sydney
Attendance: 83,625
Referees: Matt Cecchin, Ben Cummins
Touch judges: Jeff Younis, Brett Suttor
Clive Churchill Medal: Luke Lewis (Cronulla-Sutherland)

=== First half ===
The Cronulla-Sutherland Sharks opened the scoring in the eighth minute with a penalty goal kicked by James Maloney after Marika Koroibete was penalized for a swinging arm on Chad Townsend. The Cronulla side then scored the first try after a scrum-base move from Paul Gallen sent Ben Barba over in the 15th minute. Maloney converted the goal leaving Cronulla-Sutherland with an 8 - 0 lead.

Despite dominating ball possession and field position, the Cronulla side could not break Melbourne's defence again in the first half and the score remained the same until half-time.

=== Second half ===
The Melbourne Storm regained their composure in the second half with tries to Jesse Bromwich and Will Chambers. Both tries were converted by Cameron Smith enabling the Melbourne side to take the lead 12 - 8.

The Cronulla-Sutherland Sharks responded through a try scored by prop Andrew Fifita in which he beat five Melbourne defenders from close range. Maloney again converted the goal leaving the score 14 - 12 to Cronulla with just nine minutes remaining in the match.

The Melbourne club had a prime opportunity to score when Chambers regathered his own grubber after a right-side break but he failed to recognise an unmarked Cooper Cronk. In the final seconds of the game Melbourne again had a chance to steal victory with a play that went from the right side of the field to the left and then back to the right. Cronulla's scrambling defence managed to hold on, with Ricky Leutele making a desperate tackle which secured the club's first ever premiership.

=== Post match ===
The Sharks players began running around the ground to celebrate, with Gallen embracing a very emotional former Sharks player Andrew Ettinghausen.

Luke Lewis was presented with the Clive Churchill Medal becoming the first Cronulla player in history to win the award, for his defensive game, running 128 metres and taking 21 tackles. There was debate as to whether him or Fifita, who scored the match winning try, deserved the honour. Lewis' credited his teammates with his medal-winning performance, "It's pretty special to have this around your neck, but I really believe it wouldn't be possible if it wasn't for the other 16 blokes in the side." The medal capped off an incredible comeback for Lewis after being diagnosed with cancer in 2012 which resulted in his thyroid being removed, moving to Cronulla once he was cleared to play in 2013 and changed positions from wing to the front row to prolong his career.

During the presentation proceedings, the club representatives were Ettinghausen (Cronulla) and Matt Geyer (Melbourne).

Gallen's winning speech is considered to be one of the most famous in NRL history, noted back to a famous quote made by former Cronulla coach, Jack Gibson, who compared the Sharks winning the premiership to leaving a porchlight on for Harold Holt's return, Gallen happily shouted to the crowd,

"To all you people back at the Shire, turn your porchlights off cause we're coming home with the trophy!" - Paul Gallen, during the presentation ceremony

Norm Provan and Arthur Summons presented the Provan-Summons Trophy to Gallen and Flanagan. It was the last time both Provan and Summons presented the trophy together before Summons death in 2020.

== Opening games ==
Two matches were played before the grand final, with both matches broadcast on the Nine Network.

=== Holden Cup NRL Under-20s Grand Final ===
2016 Holden Cup NRL-Under 20s Grand Final

Sunday, 2 October
13:35 AEDT (UTC+11)

Penrith Panthers U20s	28 – 30	Sydney Roosters U20s
Tries: 5 Crichton 16'; Waddell 21'; Burns 24'; Ellis 34'; Egan 38'; Goals: 4 Edwards 17', 22', 35', 39' (4/6)	1st: 28–6; 2nd: 0–24; Report	Tries: 5 Manu 8', 65'; Butcher 43'; Tupouniua 49'; Tuivasa-Sheck 73'; Goals: 5 Marschke 10', 44', 51', 66', 74' (5/5)

ANZ Stadium, Sydney
Referees: Ziggy Przeklasa-Adamski, Drew Oultram
Jack Gibson Medal: Nat Butcher (Sydney)

Team details
Penrith Panthers		Position	Sydney Roosters
Name	Number	Position	Number	Name
Dylan Edwards	1	Fullback	1	Kiah Cooper
Ratu Tuisese	2	Wing	2	Johnny Tuivasa-Sheck
Christian Crichton	3	Centre	3	Joseph Manu
Braidon Burns	4	Centre	4	Jarred Anderson
Daniel Brown	5	Wing	5	Bernard Lewis
Tyrone May	6	Five eighth	6	Paul Momirovski
Soni Luke	7	Half back	7	Jesse Marschke
Cowan Epere	8	Prop forward	8	Poasa Faamausili
Wayde Egan	9	Hooker	9	Grant Garvey (c)
Oliver Clark	10	Prop forward	10	Ben Thomas
Kaide Ellis	11	Second row	11	Reuben Porter
Corey Waddell	12	Second row	12	Victor Radley
Reed Izzard (c)	13	Lock forward	13	Nat Butcher (c)
Dean Blore	14	Interchange	14	Jarrett Boland
Liam Martin	15	Interchange	15	Brendan Frei
Thompson Tuigamala	16	Interchange	16	Sukamanu Raki
Jack Nelson	17	Interchange	17	Sitili Tupouniua
Cameron Ciraldo		Coach		Anthony Barnes
RLP

=== NRL State Championship ===
2016 NRL State Championship

Sunday, 2 October
15:40 AEDT (UTC+11)

Illawarra Cutters	54 – 12	Burleigh Bears
Tries: 9 Wakeman 7'; Sironen 23'; Quinlan 26'; Host 32'; Lewis 37'; Hutchinson 44'; Havili 53'; Mann 57'; Milne 63'; Goals: 9 Nona 8', 24', 33', 39', 47', 55', 58', 65' (9/9)	1st: 30–0; 2nd: 24–12; Report	Tries: 2 Ailaomai 61'; Row 80'; Goals: 2 Fogarty 61' (1/1); Page 80' (1/1)

ANZ Stadium, Sydney
Referees: Peter Gough, Jon Stone
Player of the Match: Drew Hutchison (Illawarra)

Team details
Illawarra Cutters		Position	Burleigh Bears
Name	Number	Position	Number	Name
Adam Quinlan	1	FB	1	Kurtis Rowe
Kurt Mann	2	WG	2	Waka Wanahi
Taane Milne	3	CE	3	Sami Sauiluma
Levi Dodd	4	CE	4	Connor Broadhurst
Kalifa Faifai Loa	5	WG	5	Oliver Regan
Shaun Nona	6	FE	6	Cameron Cullen
Drew Hutchison	7	HB	7	Jamal Fogarty
Shannon Wakeman	8	PR	8	Luke Page
Josh McCrone	9	HK	9	Pat Politoni
Jacob Host	10	PF	22	Nathaniel Peteru
Damian Sironen	15	SR	14	Parahi Wilson
Chris Lewis	12	SR	12	Hayden Schwass
Siliva Havili	13	LK	13	Lachlan Burr
Tyrone McCarthy	11	IN	10	Paterika Vaivai
Sam Coster	14	IN	15	Jeff Lynch
Jay Gallagher	16	IN	17	Louis Fanene
Sam Clune	19	IN	20	Josh Ailaomai
Jason Demetriou		Coach		Jim Lenihan
NRL.com

== Aftermath ==
Cronulla's premiership victory qualified them to take part in the 2017 World Club Series. As runners-up, Melbourne were also set to participate but withdrew from the competition, claiming that travelling to England would hamper their pre-season preparations. The Brisbane Broncos, who finished as semi finalists, was the only other team to accept an invitation, thus reducing the series into a two-game format instead of the intended three games. Playing against the Wigan Warriors, who were the 2016 Super League Champions, Cronulla-Sutherland were defeated 22 – 6.
