= 2016 NSW Cup season =

2016 Intrust Super Premiership NSW
- Teams: 12
- Premiers: Illawarra Cutters
- Minor Premiers: Mount Pritchard Mounties
- Runners-up: Mount Pritchard Mounties
- Man of Steel: Sam Williams (Mounties) (Intrust Super Premiership NSW Player of the Year)
- Top point-scorer(s): Josh Hall (Penrith) 152 (11 tries, 54 goals)
- Top try-scorer(s): Kato Ottio (Mounties) 28

Ron Massey Cup
- Number of teams: 13
- Premiers: Mount Pritchard Mounties
- Minor Premiers: Mount Pritchard Mounties
- Runners-up: St Mary's Saints
- Player of the year: Brendan Waters (Wests)
- Top point-scorer(s): Shannon Gallant (Wests) 222 (11 tries, 90 goals)
- Top try-scorer(s): Alex Nicholls-O'Neill (Asquith) 25

Sydney Shield
- Number of teams: 14
- Premiers: East Campbelltown Eagles
- Minor Premiers: Mount Pritchard Mounties
- Runners-up: Mount Pritchard Mounties
- Player of the year: Jake Pickering (Peninsula)
- Top point-scorer(s): Jake Horton (Mounties) 310 (20 tries, 115 goals)
- Top try-scorer(s): Maiko Sivo (Mounties) 38

The 2016 Intrust Super Premiership NSW is the ninth season of the NSW Cup, and the first since its sponsorship by Intrust Super. The winner will compete in the 2016 NRL State Championship, against the winner of the 2016 Queensland Cup.

== Teams ==
Colors	Club	Location	Stadium	Founded	Joined*	NRL affiliate
	Canterbury-Bankstown Bulldogs	Belmore, NSW, Australia	Belmore Sports Ground, Belmore	1934	2008	Canterbury-Bankstown Bulldogs
	Illawarra Cutters	Illawarra, NSW, Australia	WIN Stadium, Wollongong	2012	2012	St. George-Illawarra Dragons
	Manly-Warringah Sea Eagles	Manly, NSW, Australia	Brookvale Oval, Manly	1946	2008	Manly-Warringah Sea Eagles
	Mount Pritchard Mounties	Mount Pritchard, NSW, Australia	Mt Pritchard Oval, Mount Pritchard	2012	2012	Canberra Raiders
	Newcastle Knights	Newcastle, NSW, Australia	Hunter Stadium, Newcastle	1988	2012	Newcastle Knights
	Newtown Jets	Newtown, NSW, Australia	Henson Park, Newtown	1908	2008	Cronulla Sharks
	New Zealand Warriors	Penrose, Auckland	Mt Smart Stadium	2007	2014	New Zealand Warriors
	North Sydney Bears	Sydney, NSW, Australia	North Sydney Oval, Sydney	1908	2008	South Sydney Rabbitohs
	Penrith Panthers	Penrith, NSW, Australia	Sportingbet Stadium, Windsor	1966	2008	Penrith Panthers
	Wentworthville Magpies	Wentworthville, NSW, Australia	Ringrose Park, Wentworthville	1963	2008	Parramatta Eels
	Wests Tigers	Leichhardt, NSW, Australia	Campbelltown Stadium, Campbelltown; Leichhardt Oval, Leichhardt	1999	2013	Wests Tigers
	Wyong Roos	Kanwal, NSW, Australia	Morrie Breen Oval, Kanwal	1910	2013	Sydney Roosters

*: The season the team joined is in the NSW Cup/Intrust Super Premiership, not any other competition before this.

== Ladder ==
2016 New South Wales Cup season - Final Table
	Team	Pld	W	D	L	B	PF	PA	PD	Pts
1	Mount Pritchard Mounties	25	19	0	3	3	609	453	+156	44
2	Illawarra Cutters	25	15	0	7	3	595	445	+150	36
3	Newtown Jets	25	14	0	8	3	599	522	+77	34
4	Wests Tigers	25	13	1	8	3	534	475	+59	33
5	New Zealand Warriors	25	12	0	10	3	537	498	+39	30
6	Wyong Roos	25	11	0	11	3	534	502	+32	28
7	Canterbury-Bankstown Bulldogs	25	10	1	11	3	510	484	+26	27
8	Penrith Panthers	25	10	0	12	3	580	464	+116	26
9	Wentworthville Magpies	25	10	0	12	3	472	573	-101	26
10	North Sydney Bears	25	9	0	13	3	410	479	-69	24
11	Manly-Warringah Sea Eagles	25	6	0	16	3	528	699	-171	18
12	Newcastle Knights	25	2	0	20	3	385	699	-314	10

== Finals ==
The finals commenced on 3 September.

Qualifying and elimination finals
Pepper Stadium
1	Mounties	30
4	Jets	12
Mt Smart Stadium
5	Warriors	21
8	Panthers	14
Pepper Stadium
6	Roos	19
7	Bulldogs	18
Jubilee Oval
2	Cutters	32
3	Tigers	22

Semi-finals
Pepper Stadium
Jets	22
Warriors	18
Pepper Stadium
Tigers	26
Roos	16

Preliminary finals
Leichhardt Oval
Mounties	24
Tigers	18
Leichhardt Oval
Cutters	18
Jets	10

Grand final
Pirtek Stadium
Mounties	20
Cutters	21

=== NSW Cup Grand Final ===
Sunday, 25 September
4:00pm

Illawarra Cutters	21 – 20	Mount Pritchard Mounties

Pirtek Stadium, Sydney
Player of the Match: Drew Hutchison

=== NRL State Championship ===
As premiers of the NSW Cup, the Illawarra Cutters faced Queensland Cup premiers Burleigh Bears in the NRL State Championship match.

2016 NRL State Championship

Sunday, 2 October
15:40 AEDT (UTC+11)

Illawarra Cutters	54 – 12	Burleigh Bears
Tries: 9 Wakeman 7'; Sironen 23'; Quinlan 26'; Host 32'; Lewis 37'; Hutchinson 44'; Havili 53'; Mann 57'; Milne 63'; Goals: 9 Nona 8', 24', 33', 39', 47', 55', 58', 65' (9/9)	1st: 30–0; 2nd: 24–12; Report	Tries: 2 Ailaomai 61'; Row 80'; Goals: 2 Fogarty 61' (1/1); Page 80' (1/1)

ANZ Stadium, Sydney
Referees: Peter Gough, Jon Stone
Player of the Match: Drew Hutchison (Illawarra)

== Ron Massey Cup ==
=== Ladder ===
2016 Ron Massey Cup season - Final Table
	Team	Pld	W	D	L	B	PF	PA	PD	Pts
1	Mount Pritchard Mounties	20	16	0	4	2	688	333	+355	36
2	Western Suburbs Magpies	20	15	0	5	2	647	382	+265	34
3	Wentworthville Magpies	20	14	0	6	2	649	357	+292	32
4	St Mary's Saints	20	13	0	7	2	642	429	+213	30
5	Concord Burwood Wolves	20	12	0	8	2	518	516	+2	28
6	Auburn Warriors	20	10	1	9	2	578	490	+88	25
7	Guildford Owls	20	9	1	10	2	518	445	+73	23
8	Hills District Bulls	20	9	0	11	2	642	446	+196	22
9	Asquith Magpies	20	9	0	11	2	473	608	-135	22
10	Blacktown Workers	20	8	0	12	2	503	496	+7	20
11	Cabramatta Two Blues	20	8	0	12	2	452	608	-156	20
12	Windsor Wolves	20	5	0	15	2	376	626	-250	14
13	Kingsgrove Colts	20	1	0	19	2	170	1120	-950	6

=== Finals ===
Qualifying and elimination finals
Campbelltown Stadium
1	Mounties	22
4	St Marys	26
St Mary's Leagues Stadium
5	Concord Burwood	18
8	Hills District	44
St Mary's Leagues Stadium
6	Auburn Warriors	10
7	Guildford	32
Windsor Sporting Complex
2	Western Suburbs	12
3	Wentworthville	13

Semi-finals
St Mary's Leagues Stadium
Mounties	48
Hills District	0
St Mary's Leagues Stadium
Western Suburbs	32
Guildford	24

Preliminary finals
Campbelltown Sports Stadium
St Mary's	20
Western Suburbs	14
Leichhardt Oval
Wentworthville	6
Mounties	16

Grand final
Parramatta Stadium
St Mary's	16
Mounties	36

== Sydney Shield ==
=== Ladder ===
2016 Sydney Shield season - Final Table
	Team	Pld	W	D	L	B	PF	PA	PD	Pts
1	Mount Pritchard Mounties	22	20	0	2	0	1014	346	+668	40
2	Peninsula Seagulls	22	18	0	4	0	740	423	+317	36
3	St Mary's Saints	22	17	0	5	0	787	486	+301	34
4	Belrose Eagles	22	15	1	6	0	655	461	+194	31
5	East Campbelltown Eagles	22	13	0	9	0	685	540	+145	26
6	Guildford Owls	22	13	0	9	0	681	554	+127	26
7	Wentworthville Magpies	22	12	0	10	0	720	674	+46	24
8	Cabramatta Two Blues	22	8	0	14	0	590	582	+8	16
9	Windsor Wolves	22	7	2	13	0	579	632	-53	16
10	Western Suburbs Magpies	22	8	0	14	0	651	824	-173	16
11	Auburn Warriors	22	7	1	14	0	608	738	-130	15
12	Hills District Bulls	22	7	0	15	0	626	738	-112	14
13	Blacktown Workers	22	6	0	16	0	525	730	-205	12
14	Asquith Magpies	22	1	0	21	0	137	1270	-1133	2

=== Finals ===
Qualifying and elimination finals
Campbelltown Stadium
1	Mounties	38
4	Belrose	30
Campbelltown Stadium
5	East Campbelltown	38
8	Cabramatta	26
St Mary's Leagues Stadium
6	Guildford	30
7	Wentworthville	46
Campbelltown Stadium
2	Peninsula Seagulls	22
3	St Mary's	38

Semi-finals
St Mary's Leagues Stadium
Belrose	18
East Campbelltown	32
St Mary's Leagues Stadium
Peninsula Seagulls	42
Wentworthville	32

Preliminary finals
Leichhardt Oval
Mounties	32
Peninsula Seagulls	16
Campbelltown Sports Stadium
St Mary's	6
East Campbelltown	40

Grand final
Parramatta Stadium
Mounties	24
East Campbelltown	32
