= 2016 NSW Cup Finals Series =

In the 2016 season, the Intrust Super Premiership NSW – an Australia-based rugby league competition mainly comprising clubs in New South Wales – was won by Illawarra Cutters.

== Ladder ==
Pos	Team	Pld	W	L	D	B	PF	PA	PD	Pts
1	Mount Pritchard Mounties	22	19	3	0	3	607	453	154	44
2	Illawarra Steelers	22	15	7	0	3	595	445	150	36
3	Wests Tigers	22	14	8	0	3	599	522	77	34
4	Newtown Jets	22	13	8	1	3	534	475	59	33
5	New Zealand Warriors	22	12	10	0	3	537	498	39	30
6	Wyong Roos	22	11	11	0	3	534	500	34	28
7	Canterbury-Bankstown Bulldogs	22	10	11	1	3	510	484	26	27
8	Penrith Panthers	22	10	12	0	3	580	464	116	26
9	Wentworthville Magpies	22	10	12	0	3	472	571	-99	26
10	North Sydney Bears	22	9	13	0	3	408	479	-71	24
11	Manly-Warringah Sea Eagles	22	6	16	0	3	528	699	-171	18
12	Newcastle Knights	22	2	20	0	3	385	699	-314	10

== Finals Chart ==
Qualifying and elimination finals
Pepper Stadium
1	Mounties	30
4	Jets	12
Mt Smart Stadium
5	Warriors	21
8	Panthers	14
Pepper Stadium
6	Roos	19
7	Bulldogs	18
Jubilee Oval
2	Cutters	32
3	Tigers	22

Semi-finals
Pepper Stadium
Jets	22
Warriors	18
Pepper Stadium
Tigers	26
Roos	16

Preliminary finals
Leichhardt Oval
Mounties	24
Tigers	18
Leichhardt Oval
Cutters	18
Jets	10

Grand final
Pirtek Stadium
Mounties	20
Cutters	21

== Qualifying And Elimination Finals ==
=== 1st Qualifying final ===
Saturday, 3 September
12:40PM

Illawarra Cutters
Tries:

Drew Hutchison (5')

Kalifa Faifai Loa (12', 21')

Chris Lewis (50')

Shannon Wakeman (66')

Levi Dodd (68')

Goals:

Shaun Nona 4/6 (6', 51', 67', 70')

32 - 22
Half Time:

14 - 12

Wests Tigers
Tries:

Matthew Eisenhuth (28')

Jackson Williams (36')

Manaia Cherrington (76')

JJ Felise (79')

Goals:

Justin Hunt 3/4 (29', 37', 76')

Jubilee Oval

=== 2nd Qualifying final ===
Saturday, 3 September
1:00PM

Mount Pritchard Mounties
Tries:

Zac Santo (5', 53')

Scott Sorenson (22')

Kato Ottio (27')

Brenko Lee (63')

Goals:

Maurice Kennedy 5/6 (6', 24', 44', 54', 64')

30 - 12
Half Time:

16 - 6

Newtown Jets
Tries:

Matt Mckilwrick (33')

Fa'amanu Brown (71')

Goals:

Fa'amanu Brown 2/2 (35', 72')

Pepper Stadium

=== 1st Elimination final ===
Saturday, 3 September
3:00PM

Wyong Roos
Tries:

Omar Slaimankhel (6', 47')

Mitchell Williams (27')

Goals:

Tyler Cornish 3/4 (7', 27', 53')

Field Goals:

Joey Lussick (80')

19 - 18
Half Time:

12 - 16

Canterbury-Bankstown Bulldogs
Tries:

Makahesi Makatoa (11')

Marcelo Montoya (32')

Renouf Toomaga (37')

Goals:

Craig Garvey 2/3 (12', 38')

Harrison Siejka 1/1 (79')

Pepper Stadium

=== 2nd Elimination final ===
Sunday, 4 September
1:35PM

New Zealand Warriors
Tries:

Henare Wells (3', 10')

James Gavet (28')

Matthew Allwood (67')

Goals:

Mason Lino 2/4 (29', 69')

Field Goals:

Mason Lino (79')

21 - 14
Half Time:

14 - 6

Penrith Panthers
Tries:

Chris Aunese-Scanlon (39')

Atonio Tauiliili Pelesasa (48')

Goals:

Zach Dockar-Clay 3/3 (40', 49', 61')

Mount Smart Stadium

== Semi-finals ==
=== 1st Semi-final ===
Sunday, 11 September
4:00PM

Wests Tigers
Tries:

Justin Hunt (11')

Jordan Grant (15')

Jack Littlejohn (38')

Josh Addu (59')

Goals:

Justin Hunt 4/4 (13', 16', 40', 60')

Tyler Cassel 1/1 (45')

26 - 16
Half Time:

18 - 12

Wyong Roos
Tries:

Tyler Cornish (5')

Luke Garner (22', 66')

Goals:

Tyler Cornish 2/3 (6', 23')

Pepper Stadium

=== 2nd Semi-final ===
Sunday, 11 September
6:35PM

Newtown Jets
Tries:

Josh Cleeland (13')

Corin Smith (26')

Matt Mckilwrick (42')

Kurt Kara (50')

Goals:

Fa'amanu Brown 3/5 (43', 51', 60')

22 - 18
Half Time:

8 - 8

New Zealand Warriors
Tries:

Nathaniel Roach (4')

Hanare Wells (36', 67')

Charnze Nicoll-Klokstad (78')

Goals:

Mason Lino 1/4 (79')

Pepper Stadium

== Preliminary Finals ==
=== 1st Preliminary final ===
Sunday, 18 September
3:15PM

Mount Pritchard Mounties
Tries:

Edward Aiono (29') 1

Zac Santo (43') 1

Jarrad Kennedy (71') 1

Adam Clydsdale (76') 1

Goals:

Sam Williams 4/4

(31', 45', 73', 77')

24 - 18
1st: 6 - 18

2nd: 18 - 0

Wests Tigers
Tries:

1 (1') Watson Heleta

2 (24', 34') Jeremy Marshall-King

Goals:

3/4 Justin Hunt

(18' pen, 26', 35')

Leichhardt Oval

=== 2nd Preliminary final ===
Sunday, 18 September
5:15PM

Illawarra Cutters
Tries:

Taane Milne (16') 1

Jacob Host (73') 1

Adam Quinlan (76') 1

Goals:

Shaun Nona 1/1

(16')

Levi Dodd 2/2

(74', 77')

18 - 10
1st: 6 - 6

2nd: 12 - 4

Newtown Jets
Tries:

1 (3') Kenny Niko

1 (47') Jacob Gagan

Goals:

1/3 Fa'amanu Brown

(38' pen)

Leichhardt Oval

== Grand final ==
Sunday, 25 September
4:15PM

Mount Pritchard Mounties	20 – 21	Illawarra Cutters
Tries: Edward Aiono (16') 1 Sam Duggan (25') 1 Scott Sorensen (37') 1 Zac Santo (42') 1 Goals: Sam Williams 2/4 (26', 43')	1st: 14 - 16; 2nd: 6 - 5	Tries: 2 (12', 65') Kalifa FaiFai Loa; 1 (3') Levi Dodd; 1 (9') Kurt Mann; Goals: 2/4 Levi Dodd (4', 13'); Field Goals: 1 (73') Drew Hutchinson

Pirtek Stadium, Parramatta
Referee: Jon Stone
