= 2016 Intrust Super Premiership NSW Results =

The 2016 Intrust Super Premiership season consists of 25 regular season round starting on Saturday, March 5, 2016, and ending on Saturday, 24 September 2016 with the Grand Final.

== Regular season ==
=== Round 1 ===
Home	Score	Away	Date	Venue
Mount Prichard Mounties	26-24	Penrith Panthers	March 5, 2016	GIO Stadium
Wests Tigers	34-16	Manly-Warringah Sea Eagles	March 5, 2016	Campbelltown Stadium
Newtown Jets	16-16	Canterbury-Bankstown Bulldogs	March 5, 2016	Henson Park
Illawarra Cutters	36-22	New Zealand Warriors	March 5, 2016	WIN Stadium
Newcastle Knights	12-28	North Sydney Bears	March 6, 2016	Kurri Sports Ground
Wentworthville Magpies	28-18	Wyong Roos	March 6, 2016	Ringrose Park
