= Jonus Pearson =

Australian rugby league footballer

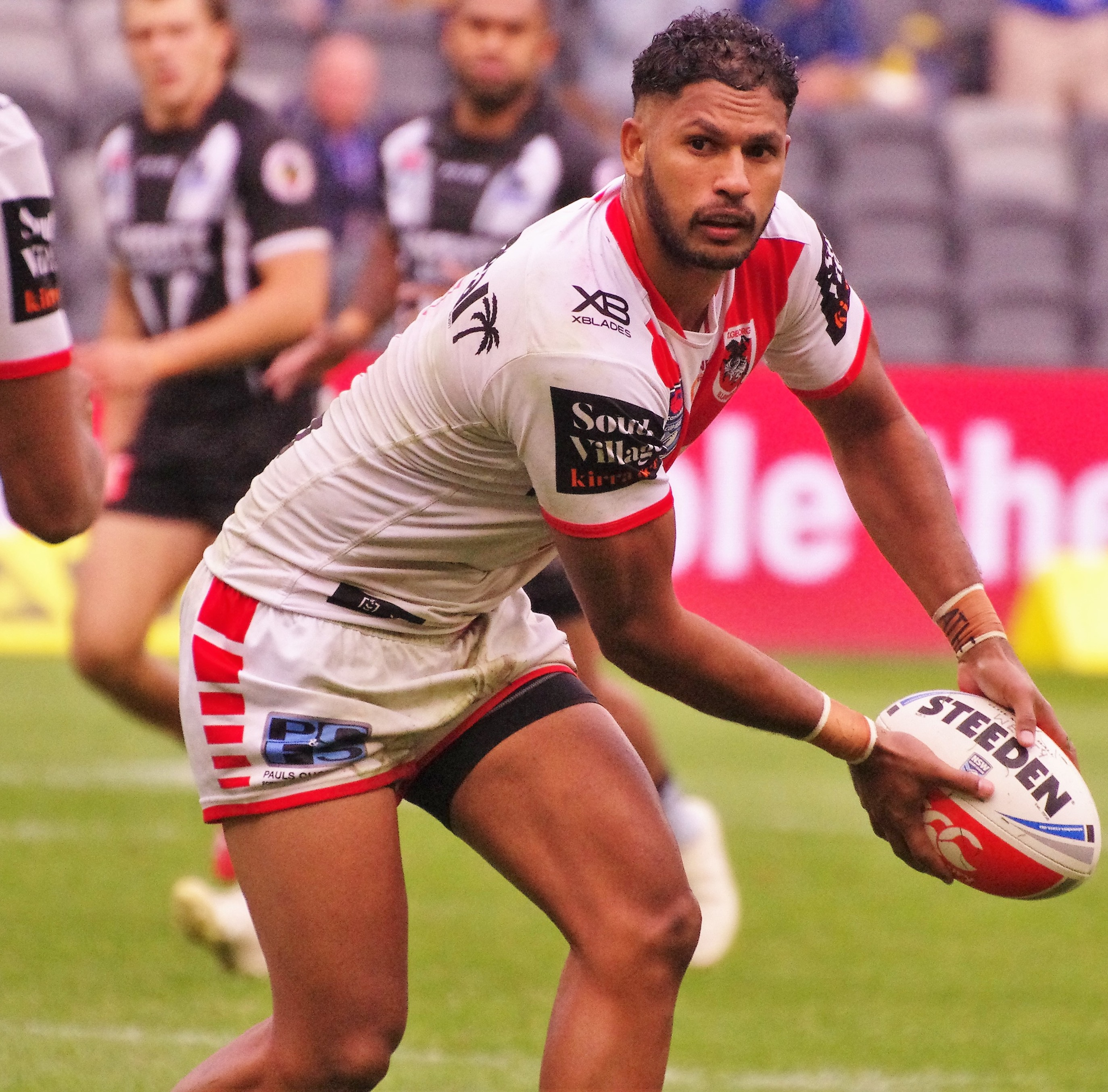

Personal information
- Born: 28 May 1995 (age 31) Thursday Island, Queensland, Australia
- Height: 186 cm (6 ft 1 in)
- Weight: 96 kg (15 st 2 lb)

Playing information
- Position: Wing, Centre, Fullback
Club
Years	Team	Pld	T	G	FG	P
2016–18	Brisbane Broncos	11	4	0	0	16
2019	St. George Illawarra	10	2	0	0	8
2020–21	Gold Coast Titans	2	0	0	0	0
	Total	23	6	0	0	24
Representative
Years	Team	Pld	T	G	FG	P
2017–18	Queensland Residents	2	0	0	0	0
- Source: As of 7 January 2024

Jonus Pearson (born 28 May 1995) is an Australian professional rugby league footballer who plays as a winger for the Central Queensland Capras in the Queensland Cup.

He previously played for the Brisbane Broncos, Gold Coast Titans and St George Illawarra Dragons in the National Rugby League.

== Background ==
Pearson was born on Thursday Island, Queensland, Australia.

He attended St Brendan's College in Yeppoon and played his junior rugby league for the Yeppoon Seagulls, before being signed by the Brisbane Broncos.

== Playing career ==
=== 2015 ===
In 2015, Pearson played for the Brisbane Broncos' NYC team.

=== 2016 ===
In 2016, Pearson graduated to Brisbane's Queensland Cup team, Redcliffe Dolphins. In Round 23 of the 2016 NRL season, he made his NRL debut for the Brisbane club against the Parramatta Eels, scoring two tries. In September, he re-signed with the Brisbane club on a one-year contract until the end of 2017.

=== 2018 ===
At the end of 2018, he signed with St. George Illawarra on a two-year deal after 11 intermittent appearances for Brisbane between 2016 and 2018.

=== 2019 ===
Pearson made 10 appearances for St. George in the 2019 NRL season as the club finished second last on the table after a horror year on and off the field. On 18 December, it was announced that St George had released Pearson from the final year of his contract so he could join the Gold Coast on a two-year deal.

=== 2020 ===
Pearson played only one game for the Gold Coast in the 2020 NRL season as the club finished ninth on the table and missed the finals.

=== 2021 ===
Pearson made only one appearance for the Gold Coast in the 2021 NRL season. On 14 September, he was released by the club.

Following his departure from the Gold Coast, it was announced Pearson would be playing with Rockhampton-based QRL club the Central Queensland Capras in the Queensland Cup competition during the 2022 season.
