= Jacob Host =

Australian rugby league footballer

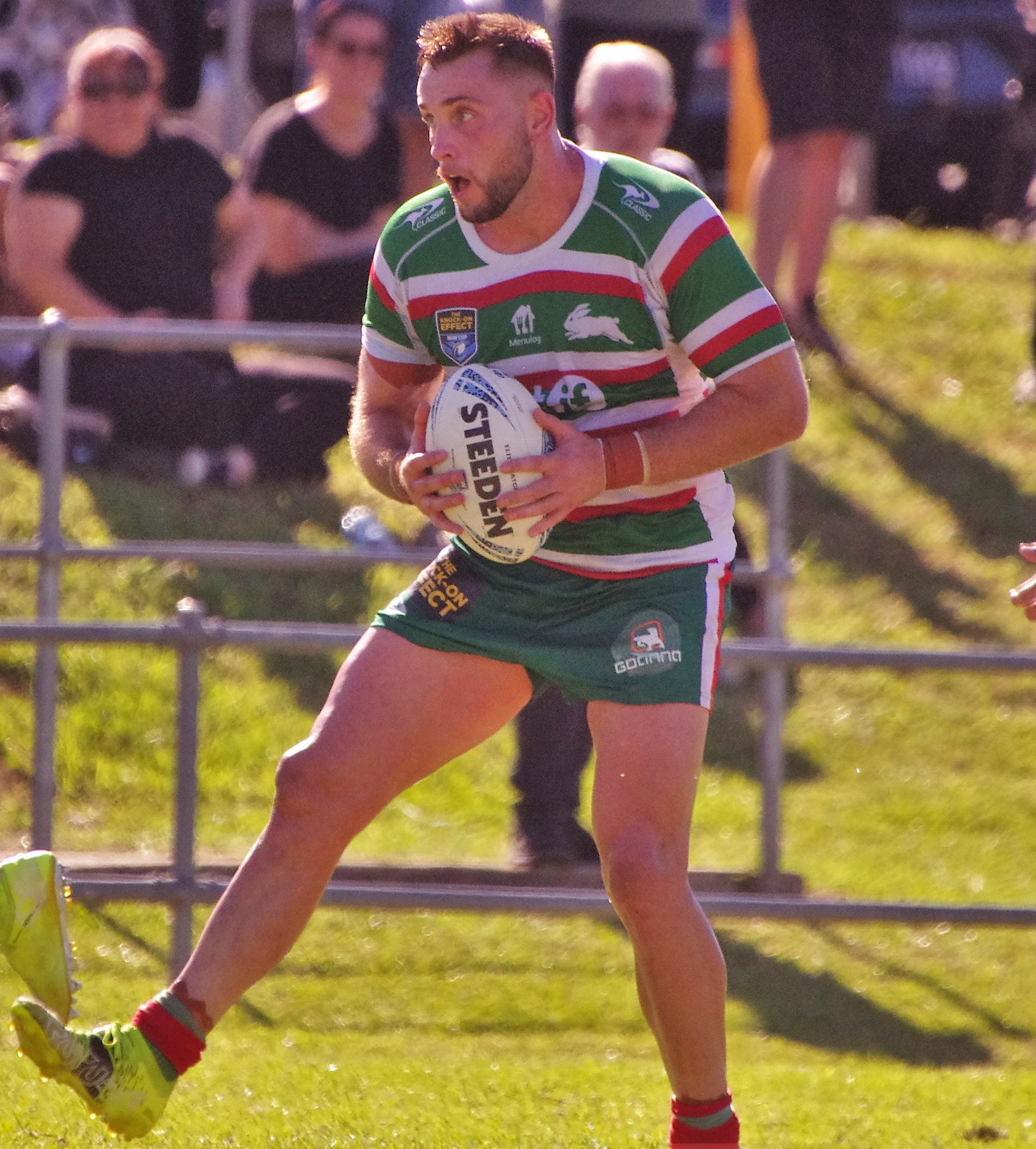

Personal information
- Full name: Jacob Graham Host
- Born: 30 September 1996 (age 30) Padstow, New South Wales, Australia
- Height: 6 ft 3 in (1.90 m)
- Weight: 16 st 10 lb (106 kg)

Playing information
- Position: Second-row, Prop, Loose forward
Club
Years	Team	Pld	T	G	FG	P
2016–20	St. George Illawarra	51	5	0	0	20
2021–25	South Sydney	68	6	0	0	24
2026–	St Helens	16	2	0	0	8
	Total	135	13	0	0	52
- Source: As of 21 November 2026

Jacob Host (born 30 September 1996) is an Australian professional rugby league footballer who plays as a second-row forward for St Helens in the Super League.

He previously played for the St. George Illawarra Dragons and South Sydney in the NRL.

== Background ==
Host was born in Padstow, New South Wales, Australia.

He played his junior rugby league for Renown United, before being signed by the St. George Illawarra Dragons.

Host is also an avid video gamer and streams on Twitch as xhostyy.

== Playing career ==
=== Early career ===
From 2014 to 2016, Host played for the St. George Illawarra Dragons' NYC team. On 25 July 2014, he re-signed with the Dragons on a 3-year contract. In November and December 2014, he played for the Australian Schoolboys.

=== 2016 ===
In round 9 of the 2016 NRL season, Host made his NRL debut for the Dragons against the New Zealand Warriors. In September, he was named on the interchange bench in the 2016 Intrust Super Premiership NSW Team of the Year. He was a member of the Illawarra Cutters side who won the 2016 Intrust Super Premiership NSW Grand Final. The following week he was part of the Cutters side which won the state championship match against Queensland Cup winners Burleigh Bears.

=== 2017 ===
Host made 11 appearances for St George in 2017 as the club went from sitting third on the table at the halfway mark of the season to end up finishing a disappointing ninth place missing the finals. Between Rounds 13 and 26, the club only managed to win 4 games including a final round loss against the Canterbury-Bankstown Bulldogs where St George only needed to win the match to finish in eighth place and make the finals.

=== 2018 ===
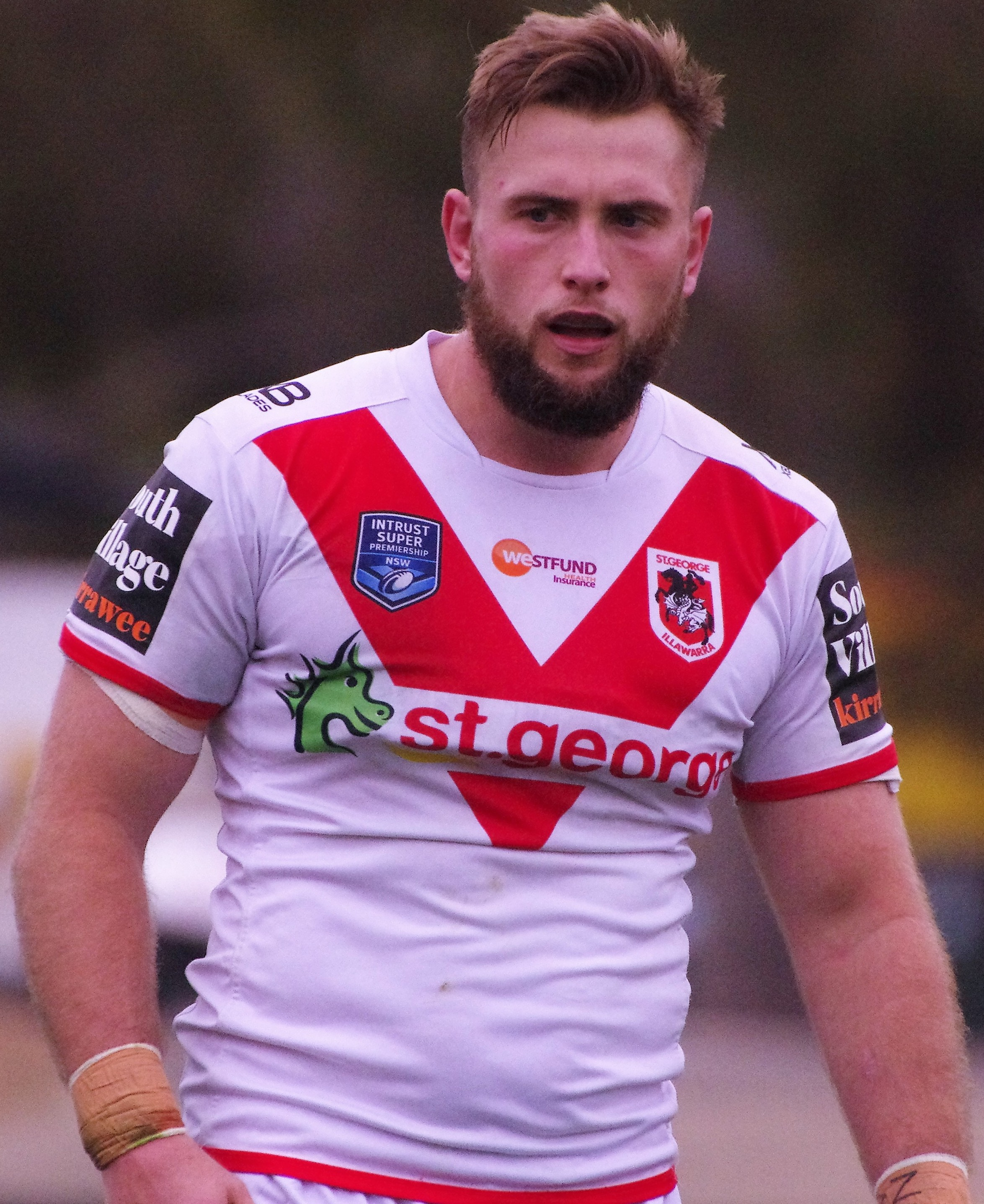
Host playing for St. George Illawarra in 2018

Host managed to only make 5 appearances for St George in 2018 and mainly featured for the Intrust Super Premiership NSW side instead.

=== 2019 ===
Host made a total of 17 appearances for St George in the 2019 NRL season as the club finished second last on the table.

=== 2020 ===
Host scored his first try of the 2020 NRL season in round 16 during a 14–10 loss against the Gold Coast at Kogarah Oval.

In October 2020, Host signed a three-year contract with South Sydney.

=== 2021 ===
Host made his club debut for South Sydney in round 1 of the 2021 NRL season against Melbourne which Souths lost 26–18. In round 8 against Canberra, he was sent to the sin bin for a professional foul in South Sydney's 34–20 victory. Host played a total of 21 games for South Sydney in the 2021 NRL season including the club's 2021 NRL Grand Final defeat against Penrith.

=== 2022 ===
Host was limited to only eight appearances for South Sydney in the 2022 NRL season. Host did not feature in any of South Sydney's finals matches as they reached the preliminary final before losing to Penrith.

=== 2023 ===
On 30 March, Host signed a two-year contract extension to remain at Souths until the end of 2025. Host played a total of 17 games for Souths in the 2023 NRL season as the club finished 9th on the table and missed the finals.

=== 2024 ===
Host played 14 games for South Sydney in the 2024 NRL season as the club endured a difficult campaign finishing 16th on the table.

=== 2025 ===
Host was limited to only eight matches for South Sydney in the 2025 NRL season which saw the club finish 14th on the table. Host was one of nine players released by the South Sydney club at the end of the season.

On 1 October 2025 it was announced that he had signed a two-year deal with St Helens to play in the Super League from 2026

=== 2026 ===
Host made his club debut for St Helens in round 1 of the 2026 Super League season against Warrington which ended in a 24-14 loss. On 10 March, it was announced Host would miss four months with a broken leg.

== Statistics ==
Year	Team	Games	Tries	Pts
2016	St. George Illawarra Dragons	8	1	4
2017	St. George Illawarra Dragons	11	1	4
2018	St. George Illawarra Dragons	5		
2019	St. George Illawarra Dragons	17	1	4
2020	St. George Illawarra Dragons	10	2	8
2021	South Sydney Rabbitohs	21	1	4
2022	South Sydney Rabbitohs	8		
2023	South Sydney Rabbitohs	17	3	12
2024	South Sydney Rabbitohs	14	1	4
2025	South Sydney Rabbitohs	8		
2026	St Helens	7	1	4
	Totals	126	11	44
