= Drew Hutchison (rugby league) =

Australian rugby league footballer

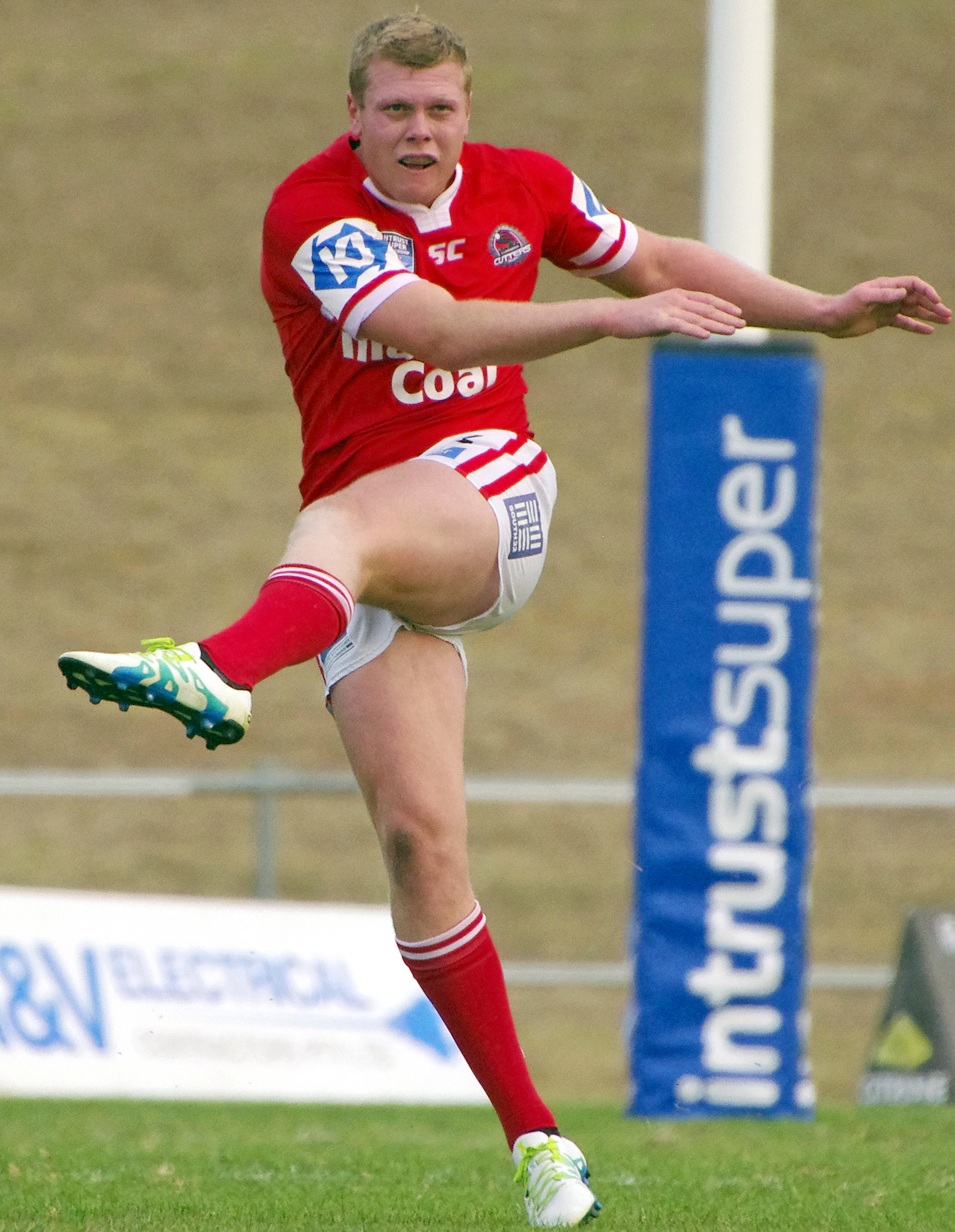

Personal information
- Born: 26 April 1995 (age 31) Wollongong, New South Wales, Australia
- Height: 187 cm (6 ft 2 in)
- Weight: 97 kg (15 st 4 lb)

Playing information
- Position: Five-eighth, Halfback
Club
Years	Team	Pld	T	G	FG	P
2015–17	St. George Illawarra	4	1	0	0	4
2018	Leigh Centurions	35	13	0	0	52
2019–23	Sydney Roosters	71	11	1	0	46
2024	Canterbury Bulldogs	13	0	0	0	0
	Total	123	25	1	0	102
- Source: As of 7 September 2024

Andrew Hutchison (born 26 April 1995) is an Australian professional rugby league footballer who last played as a halfback for the Canterbury-Bankstown Bulldogs in the National Rugby League (NRL).

He previously played for the St. George Illawarra Dragons and the Sydney Roosters in the NRL and the Leigh Centurions in the Championship.

== Background ==
Hutchison was born in Wollongong, New South Wales, Australia.

He played his junior rugby league for the Albion Park-Oak Flats Eagles, before being signed by the St. George Illawarra Dragons.

== Playing career ==
=== Early career ===
In 2013 and 2014, Drew Hutchison played for the St. George Illawarra Dragons' NYC team. On 3 May 2014, he was a late inclusion for the New South Wales under-20s team against the Queensland under-20s team, after Luke Brooks was withdrawn. On 2 September 2014, he was named at halfback in the 2014 NYC Team of the Year and re-signed with the Dragons on a 3-year contract until the end of 2017. On 18 October 2014, he played for the Junior Kangaroos against the Junior Kiwis.

=== 2015 ===
In 2015, Hutchison graduated to the Dragons' New South Wales Cup team, Illawarra Cutters. On 2 May 2015, he played for the Junior Kangaroos against Junior Kiwis for the second year in a row. On 8 July 2015, he captained the New South Wales under-20s team. In Round 18 of the 2015 NRL season, he made his NRL debut for the Dragons against the Cronulla-Sutherland Sharks.

=== 2016 ===
Hutchison kicked the winning field goal for the Illawarra Cutters in the 2016 Intrust Super Premiership NSW grand final win over the Mount Pritchard Mounties, winning 21–20.

=== 2017 ===
Hutchison was ruled out of the entire 2017 season when he suffered a serious injury at training. In October, he signed a 2-year contract with the Leigh Centurions in the Betfred Championship, starting in 2018.

=== 2019 ===
In 2019, Hutchison signed with the Sydney Roosters but spent the beginning of the season with the club's feeder side North Sydney. In Round 13, Hutchison was called into the side to replace Luke Keary who was out injured. Hutchison's first game with the club ended in a 19–10 loss against the Penrith Panthers. The following week, Hutchison kept his place in the team and scored his first try for the club as they defeated Canterbury-Bankstown 38–12 at the Sydney Cricket Ground.

Hutchison featured for North Sydney in the 2019 Canterbury Cup NSW finals series against Newtown as Norths lost the match 30–28 at Leichhardt Oval. Hutchison had a horror game with goal kicking as he only managed two out of a possible six conversions including missing a conversion from right in front of the posts.

=== 2020 ===
In round 15 of the 2020 NRL season, Hutchison scored his first try of the year as the Sydney Roosters defeated Wests Tigers 38–16 at Leichhardt Oval.

=== 2021 ===
In round 9 of the 2021 NRL season, he was taken to hospital after the conclusion of the first half against Parramatta with a broken rib and a suspected punctured lung. The injury was sustained after Parramatta player Dylan Brown dived over the top of Hutchison as he attempted to score a try in the club's 31–18 loss. He returned to first grade in round 16 Jersey 20 via the bench. Hutchison played a total of 20 games for the Sydney Roosters in the 2021 NRL season including the club's two finals matches. The Sydney Roosters would be eliminated from the second week of the finals losing to Manly 42–6.

=== 2022 ===
Hutchison played 25 games for the Sydney Roosters in the 2022 NRL season including the clubs elimination final loss to South Sydney. Throughout the season he featured as a Hooker, Five-Eighth and Centre.

=== 2023 ===
In round 24 of the 2023 NRL season, Hutchison playing at six scored two tries for the Sydney Roosters in their 30-14 victory over the Dolphins. Hutchison played a total of 17 games for the Sydney Roosters in the 2023 NRL season. On 21 September, it was announced that Hutchison would not be offered a new contract with the Sydney Roosters and would be released. Hutchison then signed a contract to join Canterbury ahead of the 2024 NRL season.

=== 2024 ===
Hutchison played 13 games for Canterbury in the 2024 NRL season as the club qualified for the finals finishing 6th on the table. Hutchison did not feature in the clubs elimination final loss against Manly.

=== 2025 ===
Hutchison played no games for Canterbury in the 2025 NRL season as the club finished fourth and qualified for the finals. He instead played 12 games for the clubs reserve grade side.

== Statistics ==
Year	Team	Games	Tries	Goals	Pts
2015	St. George Illawarra Dragons	3			
2016	St. George Illawarra Dragons	1	1		4
2018	Leigh Leopards	35	13		52
2019	Sydney Roosters	4	1	1	6
2020	Sydney Roosters	5	1		4
2021	Sydney Roosters	20	3		12
2022	Sydney Roosters	25	2		8
2023	Sydney Roosters	17	4		16
2024	Canterbury-Bankstown Bulldogs	13			
	Totals	123	25	1	102
