= Cameron Cullen =

Australian rugby league footballer

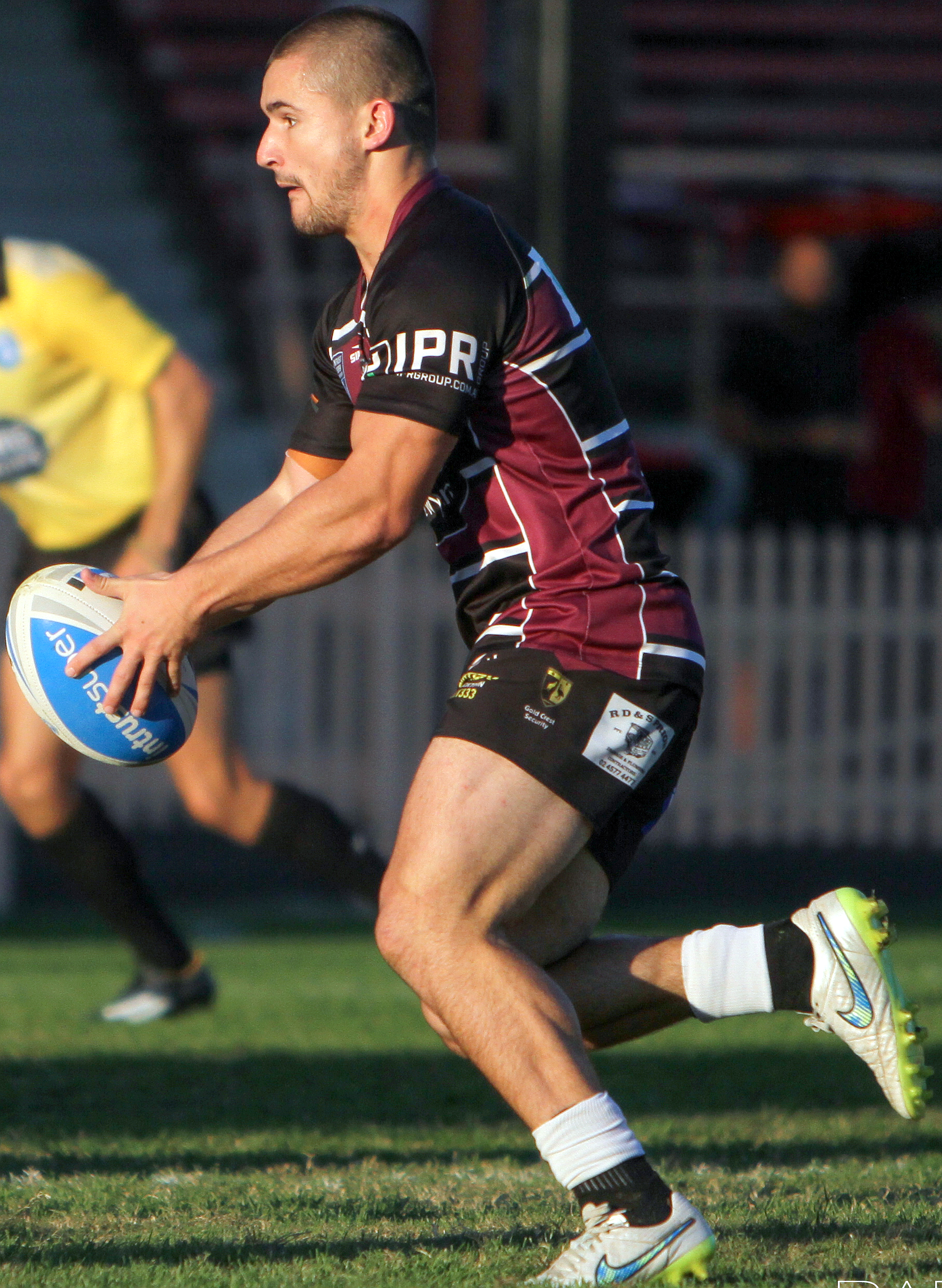

Personal information
- Born: 9 September 1993 (age 33) Brisbane, Queensland, Australia
- Height: 165 cm (5 ft 5 in)
- Weight: 86 kg (13 st 8 lb)

Playing information
- Position: Five-eighth, Halfback, Hooker
Club
Years	Team	Pld	T	G	FG	P
2016	Gold Coast Titans	5	2	0	0	8
2017	Manly Sea Eagles	5	0	0	0	0
	Total	10	2	0	0	8
Representative
Years	Team	Pld	T	G	FG	P
2016	Queensland Residents	1	0	0	0	0
- Source: As of 7 January 2024

Cameron Cullen (born 9 September 1993) is a former Australian professional rugby league footballer who previously played for the Redcliffe Dolphins in the Intrust Super Cup. He was primarily known as a five-eighth, halfback and hooker. He previously played for the Gold Coast Titans and the Manly Sea Eagles.

== Background ==
Born in Brisbane, Queensland, Cullen grew up in Cabarita, attending Palm Beach Currumbin High School on the Gold Coast and playing his junior rugby league for the Tweed Coast Raiders, before being signed by the Brisbane Broncos as a teenager.

== Playing career ==
=== Early career ===
In 2009, Cullen played for the Gold Coast Vikings Cyril Connell Cup team and represented the Queensland under-16 team. In 2010, Cullen represented the Australian Schoolboys on their tour of Wales, England and France. In 2011, Cullen played for Wynnum Manly's Mal Meninga Cup team and represented the Queensland under-18 team. Later that season he made his NYC debut for the Brisbane Broncos, playing for them until 2013. In 2014, Cullen joined the Broncos' NRL squad but spent the season playing for their Queensland Cup affiliate club, the Redcliffe Dolphins. In 2015, Cullen joined the Mackay Cutters and spent the pre-season trialling with the North Queensland Cowboys. Later that season, Cullen was named 18th man for the Queensland Residents.

=== 2016 ===
In 2016, Cullen joined the Burleigh Bears and spent the pre-season trialling with the Gold Coast Titans. On 1 March, he earned a one-year contract with the Titans.

In round 6 of the 2016 NRL season, he made his NRL debut for the Gold Coast against the Cronulla-Sutherland Sharks.

Cullen made five appearances for Manly-Warringah in the 2017 NRL season as the club reached the finals but were eliminated in the first week by Penrith.

=== 2018 ===
Cullen signed with Queensland Cup side Redcliffe for the 2018 season.

== Retirement ==
After two years with Burleigh in 2016 and 2017 and stints with Redcliffe from 2018 to 2023, Cullen retired and is currently working as Real Estate Agent.

== Personal life ==
Cullen's father, Wayne, started at halfback for the Souths Magpies in their 1985 BRL premiership win.
