= Kurtis Rowe =

New Zealand professional rugby player

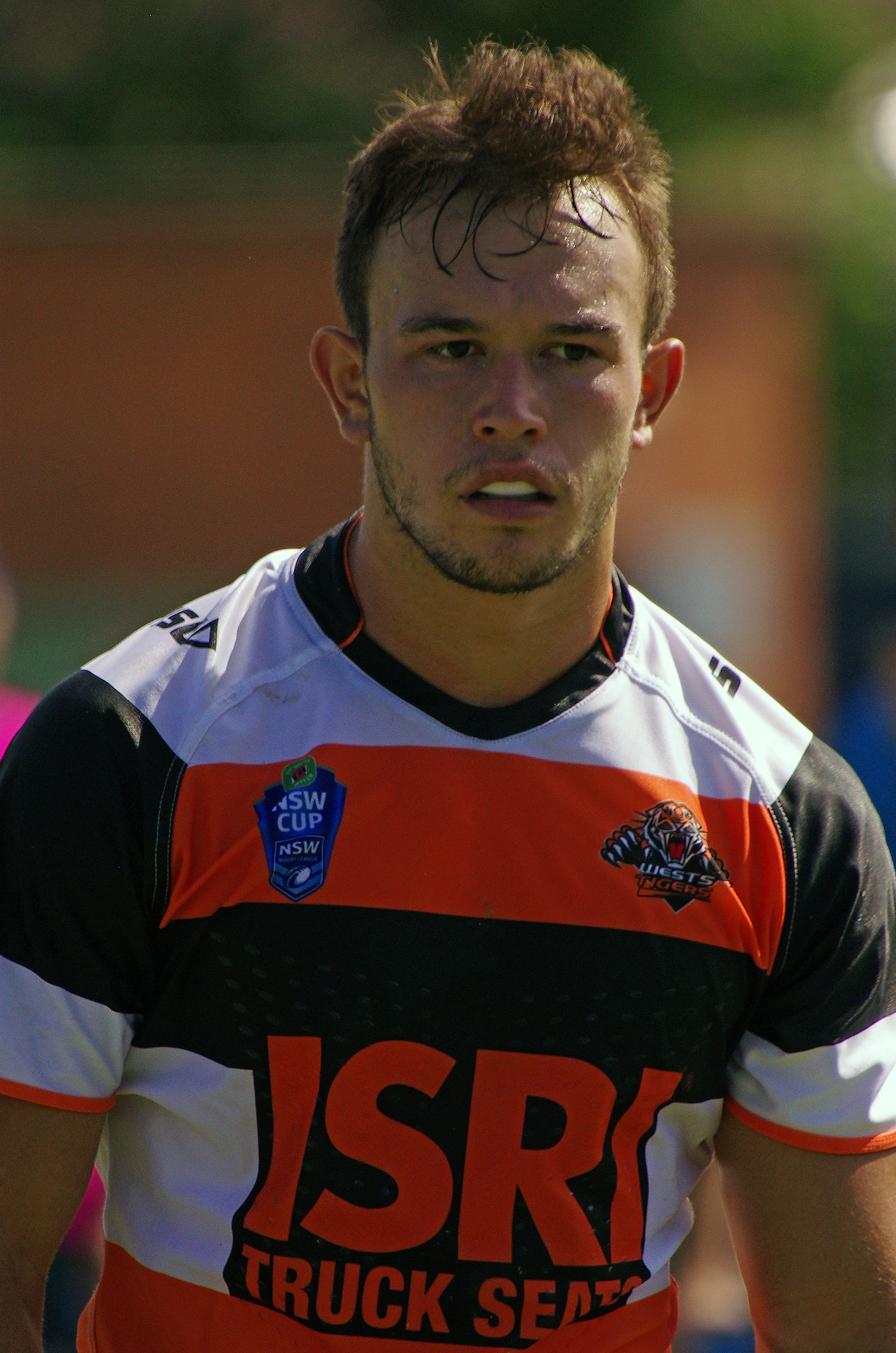
- Rowe playing for the Tigers in 2015

Personal information
- Born: 12 November 1993 (age 33) Taranaki, New Zealand
- Height: 182 cm (6 ft 0 in)
- Weight: 95 kg (14 st 13 lb)

Playing information
- Position: Fullback, Wing
Club
Years	Team	Pld	T	G	FG	P
2014	Wests Tigers	8	0	0	0	0
- Source: As of 10 October 2020

Kurtis Rowe (born 12 November 1993) is a New Zealand professional rugby league footballer who plays for the Burleigh Bears in the Queensland Cup. He plays as a fullback and wing and previously played for the Wests Tigers in the National Rugby League.

== Background ==
Born in Taranaki, New Zealand, Rowe is of Maori descent and played his junior rugby league for the Waitara Bears, before being signed by the Wests Tigers. After moving to Australia, he attended Keebra Park State High School on the Gold Coast.

== Playing career ==
=== Early career ===
In October 2011, Rowe played for the Australian Schoolboys. In 2012 and 2013, he played for the Wests Tigers' NYC team. On 13 September 2013, he re-signed with the Tigers on a 2-year contract. On 13 October 2013, he played for the Junior Kiwis against the Junior Kangaroos.

=== 2014 ===
In 2014, Rowe moved on to the Tigers' New South Wales Cup team. On 15 and 16 February, he played for the Tigers in the inaugural NRL Auckland Nines tournament. In Round 6, he made his NRL debut for the Tigers against the North Queensland Cowboys, replacing an injured James Tedesco at fullback in the Tigers' 16-4 win at Campbelltown Stadium. He played 6 consecutive games in a period where regular fullback Tedesco was injured. Later in the season when Tedesco was again injured, Mitchell Moses was instead chosen as his replacement, but Rowe did make two further appearances in first grade near the end of the season.

=== 2015 ===
Rowe was named on the wing in the 2015 New South Wales Cup Team of the Year, but failed to make a first grade appearance for the Tigers and was released at the end of the year.
