= Jim Lenihan =

Australian rugby league footballer and coach

Personal information
- Born: 16 May 1973 (age 53) Ipswich, Queensland, Australia

Playing information
- Position: Centre, Wing
Club
| Years | Team | Pld | T | G | FG | P |
|---|---|---|---|---|---|---|
| 1995 | Gold Coast Seagulls | 6 | 2 | 0 | 0 | 8 |
| 1996–98 | St George Dragons | 40 | 9 | 0 | 0 | 36 |
| 1999 | Huddersfield Giants | 21 | 12 | 0 | 0 | 48 |
| | Total | 67 | 23 | 0 | 0 | 92 |

Coaching information
Club
| Years | Team | Gms | W | D | L | W% |
| 2023 | Gold Coast Titans | 11 | 3 | 0 | 8 | 27 |
| 2026– | Huddersfield Giants | 16 | 6 | 0 | 10 | 38 |
| | Total | 27 | 9 | 0 | 18 | 33 |
- Source: As of 3 November 2026

Jim Lenihan (born 16 May 1973) is an Australian professional rugby league coach who is the head coach of the Huddersfield Giants in the Super League and a former professional rugby league footballer..

A centre or winger, he played for the Gold Coast Seagulls and St George Dragons in the ARL and NRL, and the Huddersfield Giants in the Super League. As head coach of the Burleigh Bears, he won two Queensland Cup premierships (2016 and 2019).

== Playing career ==
Born and raised in Ipswich, Queensland, Lenihan started his career with the Ipswich Jets, playing for the club from 1991 to 1994. As a youth, he started Rugby League at Ipswich Brothers Leprechauns, and he attended high school at St Edmund's College, Ipswich. In 1995, he joined the Gold Coast Seagulls and made his first grade debut in round 7 of the 1995 ARL season, scoring a try in a 16–28 loss to the Eastern Suburbs.

In 1996, after playing six games for the Gold Coast, he joined St. George. In three seasons with St. George, he played 40 games, scoring nine tries and was a regular in the side during the 1997 and 1998 seasons. Lenihan played in St. George's final game before they formed a joint venture with the Illawarra Steelers to become St. George Illawarra. A semi-final loss to Canterbury-Bankstown at Kogarah Oval.

In 1999, he joined the Huddersfield Giants in the Super League. He spent one season at the club, playing 21 games and scoring 12 tries. In 2000, he returned to Australia, joining the Burleigh Bears, playing three seasons at the club.

== Coaching career ==
From 2004-2005, Lenihan was the assistant coach of the Burleigh Bears' FOGS Colts side.

In 2006, Lenihan was appointed as head coach of the Bears' Queensland Cup side, replacing Rick Stone, who eventually joined the Newcastle Knights as an assistant coach. After making three straight Grand Finals under Stone, the Bears missed the finals for four straight seasons under Lenihan, with sixth being their highest finish. He resigned from the club at end of the 2009 season.

In 2011, after a year away from coaching, Lenihan joined the Bilambil Jets, winning the Bycroft Cup in his first season at the club. In December 2013, he rejoined Burleigh as an assistant coach after three seasons with Bilambil.

In May 2014, Lenihan became head coach of the Bears for the second time, replacing Carl Briggs. In 2016, the Bears won the Queensland Cup Grand Final, defeating the Redcliffe Dolphins 26–16 at Suncorp Stadium. In 2019, Lenihan won his second Queensland Cup Grand Final with the Bears, defeating the Wynnum Manly Seagulls 28–10 at Dolphin Stadium.

On 8 October 2019, he joined the Gold Coast Titans as an assistant coach on a three-year deal.

On 22 June 2023, Jim Lenihan was appointed interim head coach of the Gold Coast for the remainder of the 2023 season after previous Head coach Justin Holbrook departed with the club.

In September 2025, due to the sacking of coach Des Hasler, and the introduction of new coach Josh Hannay, Lenihan left the club, 1 month shy of 6 years at the club. This was because Hannay confirmed that he will field a fresh coaching staff. On September 24th 2025, following his departure from the Titans, Lenihan became head coach of the Brisbane Tigers, who plays in the Queensland Cup, for 2026 and potentially further.

=== Huddersfield Giants ===
On 8 May 2026 it was reported that he had taken the role of head-coach for Huddersfield Giants in the Super League
