= Pat Politoni =

Tonga international rugby league footballer

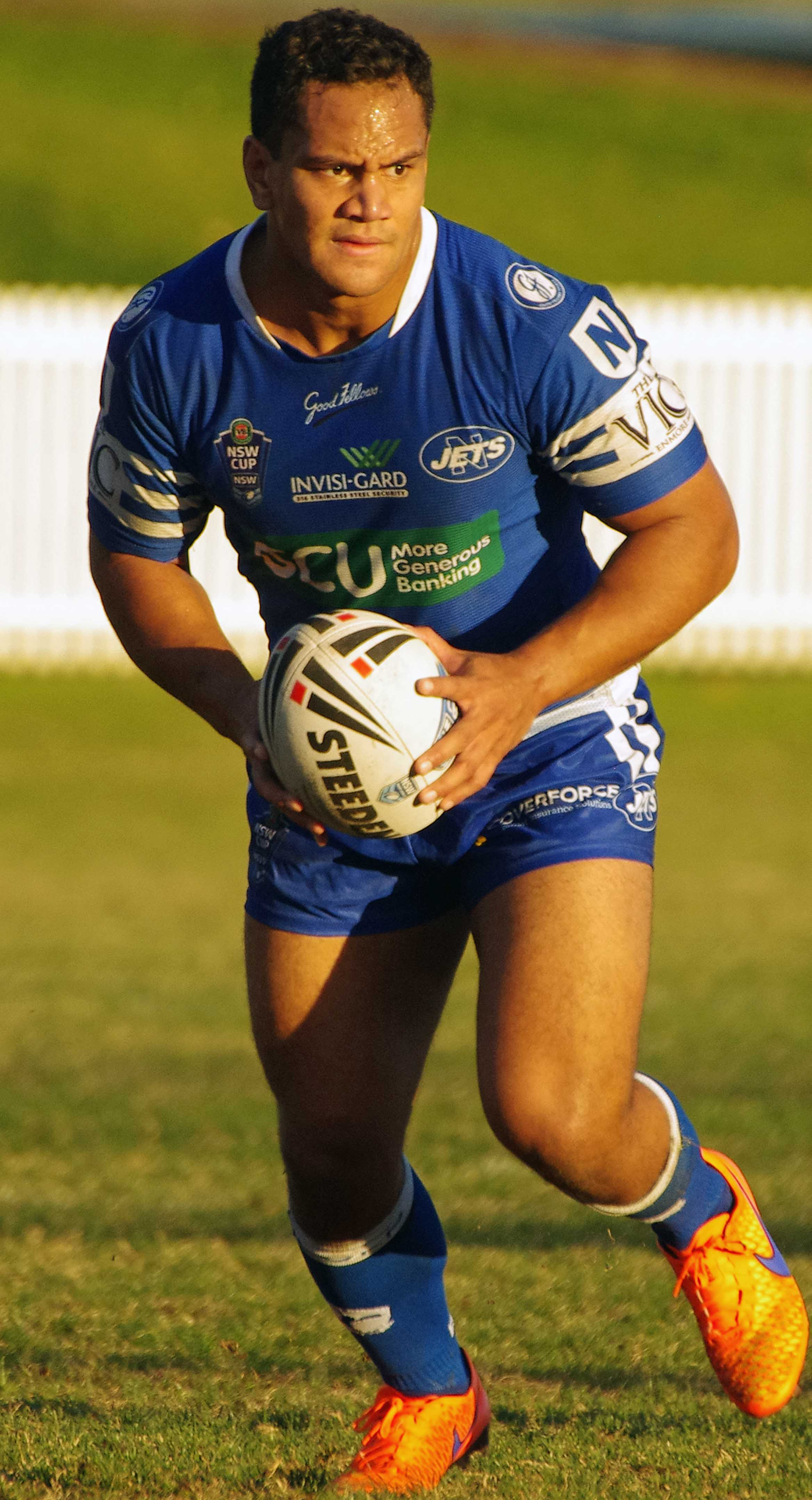

Personal information
- Full name: Patrick Politoni
- Born: 17 March 1991 (age 35) Leichhardt, New South Wales, Australia
- Height: 175 cm (5 ft 9 in)
- Weight: 89 kg (14 st 0 lb)

Playing information
- Position: Hooker
Club
Years	Team	Pld	T	G	FG	P
2012	Wests Tigers	1	0	0	0	0
2014–15	Cronulla-Sutherland	11	1	0	0	4
2017	Gold Coast Titans	4	2	0	0	8
	Total	16	3	0	0	12
Representative
Years	Team	Pld	T	G	FG	P
2013–15	Tonga	4	0	0	0	0
2018	Queensland Residents	1	0	0	0	0
- Source: As of 8 January 2024

Patrick Politoni (born 17 March 1991) is a Tonga international rugby league footballer who plays as a hooker for the Burleigh Bears in the Queensland Cup. He previously played for the Wests Tigers, Cronulla-Sutherland Sharks and the Gold Coast Titans in the NRL.

== Background ==
He was born in Leichhardt, New South Wales, Australia. Politoni is of Tongan descent.

== Playing career ==
He played his junior football for the Leichhardt Juniors, before being signed by the Wests Tigers. He played for the Tigers' Toyota Cup team from 2009 to 2011, playing over 30 games before moving on to the Tigers' NSW Cup reserve-grade side in 2012.

In round 11 of the 2012 NRL season, Politoni made his NRL debut for the Tigers against the New Zealand Warriors.

Politoni was considered to be a similar player in style to Wests Tigers first choice hooker Robbie Farah. "I always make sure I watch game highlights of Robbie Farah to see what he does."

Making just one appearance in first grade for 2012, Politoni finished the season playing for feeder team Balmain Ryde Eastwood Tigers in the NSW Cup grand final.

In 2013, Politoni joined the Cronulla-Sutherland Sharks, however he did not commence the season in the first-grade training squad, and made no appearances in first-grade. On 20 April, he played for Tonga in their Pacific Rugby League International clash with fierce Pacific rivals Samoa. Later in the year, Politoni played for Tonga in their 2013 Rugby League World Cup campaign. He made just one appearance, and that was against Pacific rivals the Cook Islands in their inter-group match, which Tonga won by a narrow six-point margin.

In round 17 of the 2014 NRL season, Politoni made his debut for Cronulla-Sutherland Sharks against the Sydney Roosters. Politoni made ten appearances for Cronulla in the 2014 NRL season as the club finished last on the table.

On 2 May 2015, Politoni played for Tonga in their Polynesian Cup clash with Pacific rivals Samoa. In October that year, Politoni played for Tonga in their Asia-Pacific Qualifier match against the Cook Islands for the 2017 Rugby League World Cup.

In 2017, Politoni joined the Gold Coast. He made four appearances for the Gold Coast in the 2017 NRL season as the club endured a horror year on and off the field finishing second last.

On 31 March 2019, Politoni was sent off for punching Townsville Blackhawks halfback Michael Parker-Walshe in the face knocking him out during a game between Burleigh Bears and Townsville. On 4 April 2019, Politoni was suspended for 3 matches after pleading guilty for punching an opposition player.
