= Nathaniel Peteru =

New Zealand rugby league footballer

Nate Peteru
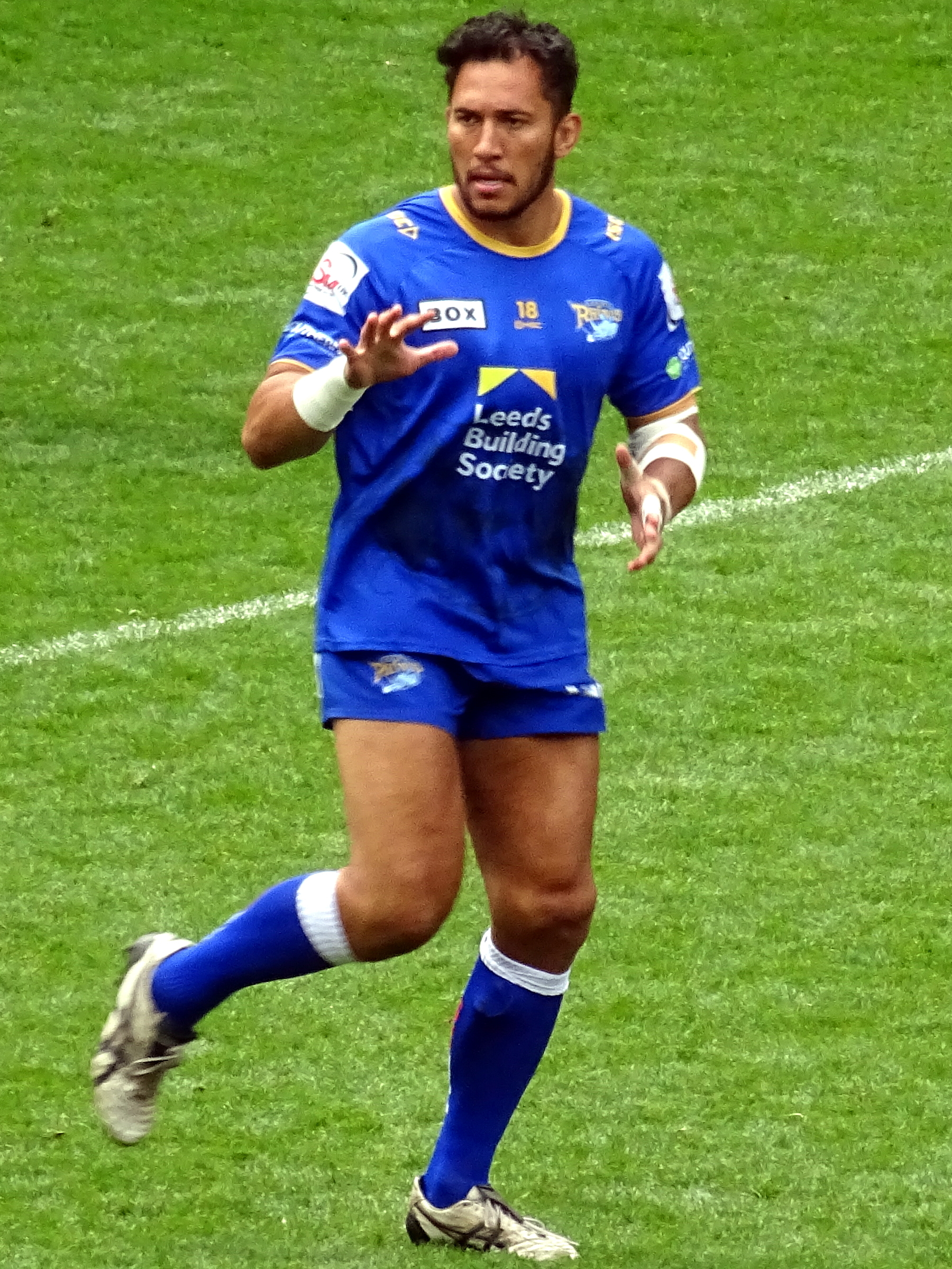

Personal information
- Full name: Nathaniel Peteru
- Born: 1 January 1992 (age 34) Auckland, New Zealand
- Height: 6 ft 5 in (1.96 m)
- Weight: 17 st 9 lb (112 kg)

Playing information
- Position: Prop, Second-row
Club
Years	Team	Pld	T	G	FG	P
2015–17	Gold Coast Titans	28	1	0	0	4
2018–19	Leeds Rhinos	37	1	0	0	4
2020	Hull Kingston Rovers	10	0	0	0	0
2021	Leigh Centurions	13	0	0	0	0
2021(loan)	→Huddersfield Giants	13	3	0	0	12
	Total	101	5	0	0	20
- Source: As of 14 January 2023

Nathaniel Peteru (born 1 January 1992) is a New Zealand professional rugby league footballer who last played as a prop and second-row forward for the Leigh Leopards in the Super League. He previously played for the Gold Coast Titans in the NRL, and for Hull Kingston Rovers and the Leeds Rhinos in the Super League.

== Background ==
Peteru was born in Auckland, New Zealand, and is of Samoan descent

== Playing career ==
Peteru played junior rugby league for the Glenora Bears in the Auckland Rugby League competition.

=== Early career ===
In 2010, Peteru was a part of the Brisbane Broncos' National Youth Competition (NYC) squad, but did not play in a game. In 2011, he returned to New Zealand to play with the New Zealand Warriors and played for their NYC team in 2011 and 2012. In 2013, he moved on to the Warriors' New South Wales Cup team, the Auckland Vulcans.

=== Gold Coast ===
On 21 February 2015, he re-signed with the Warriors on a one-year contract. However, on 6 July 2015, he was released to the Gold Coast Titans mid-season effective immediately on a 1 1/2-year contract.

In round 18 of the 2015 NRL season, Peteru made his NRL debut for the Titans against the Manly Warringah Sea Eagles. He scored a try in his debut.

Peteru also played for the Burleigh Bears in the Queensland Cup whilst signed to the Gold Coast titans

=== Leeds Rhinos ===
On 27 September 2017, the Leeds Rhinos announced the signing of Peteru on a three-year contract, starting with the 2018 season. Rhinos coach Brian McDermott said: "Nathaniel is someone we have been keeping an eye on for a while and the opportunity arose to bring him over for next season. He is an impressive individual who spoke passionately to us about his commitment to the Rhinos and what he wants to achieve in his own game and with the Rhinos." It was announced in October 2019, Leeds Rhinos agreed to release Nathaniel Peteru a year early to allow him to pursue other opportunities.

=== Hull Kingston Rovers ===
On 11 Mar 2020 it was announced that Peteru had signed a deal until the end of season with Hull Kingston Rovers.

=== Leigh Centurions ===
On 7 Nov 2020 it was announced that Peteru would join the Leigh Centurions for the 2021 season.

=== Huddersfield Giants (Loan) ===
On 11 Jul 2021 it was reported that he had signed for Huddersfield Giants in the Super League on season-long loan
