= Chris Lewis (rugby league) =

Australian rugby league footballer

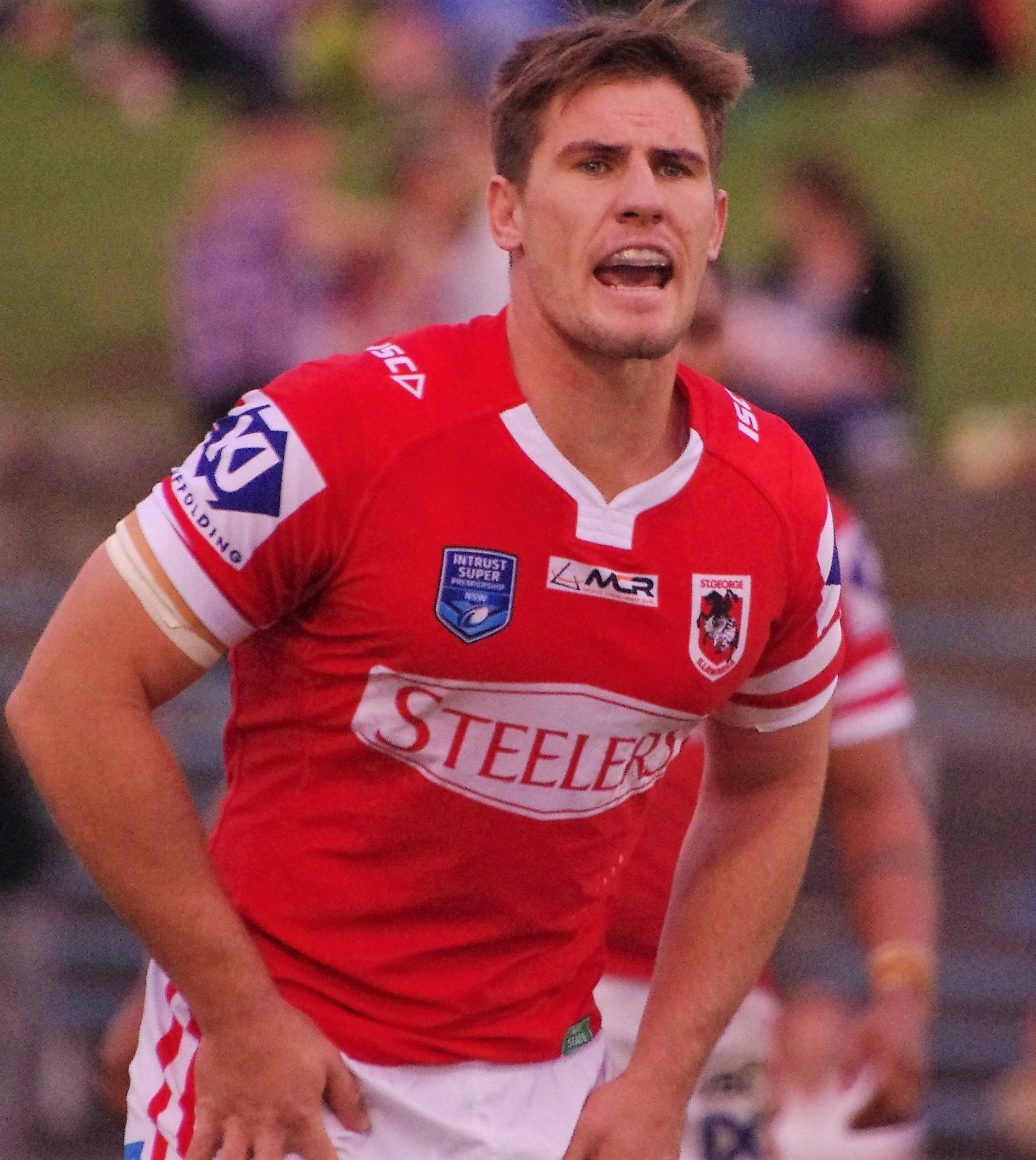

Personal information
- Full name: Christopher Lewis
- Born: 12 June 1992 (age 34) Tingha, New South Wales, Australia
- Height: 190 cm (6 ft 3 in)
- Weight: 105 kg (16 st 7 lb)

Playing information
- Position: Second-row
Club
Years	Team	Pld	T	G	FG	P
2020–24	Melbourne Storm	45	4	0	0	16
- Source: As of 8 August 2024

Chris Lewis (born 12 June 1992) is an Australian professional rugby league coach who is the head coach of the Canberra Raiders in the New South Wales Cup and a former professional rugby league footballer who last played as a second-row forward for the Melbourne Storm in the NRL.

== Early life ==
Lewis played his junior rugby league for Ashford Roosters before being signed by Illawarra Steelers.

== Playing career ==
After unsuccessful attempts at making first grade, Lewis went onto play park footy for Shellharbour Sharks, Thirroul Butchers and Helensburgh Tigers.

In 2016, he was part of the Illawarra Cutters team that won the NSW Intrust Cup premiership, while completing his teaching degree at University of Wollongong.

From 2017-19 he went onto play in the Queensland Cup for the Sunshine Coast Falcons. While playing there he worked as a teacher at Caloundra State High School. He was named the Queensland Cup second rower of the year in 2019, earning a development contract with Melbourne Storm at the end of 2019.

=== 2020 ===
Round 4 of the 2020 NRL season, Lewis made his NRL debut for the Melbourne Storm against South Sydney. He had his Melbourne jersey (cap number 202) presented to him by former Melbourne player Ryan Hoffman. Lewis would make a handful of appearances for Melbourne in 2020, as he transitioned to full time sport after putting his teaching career on hiatus.

=== 2021 ===
Lewis would play 20 games for Melbourne during the 2021 season, as the club won the J. J. Giltinan Shield as minor premiers.

=== 2024 ===
Lewis was one of 9 Melbourne players that were announced to be leaving the club at the end of the season. Melbourne later confirmed via their social media that Lewis was retiring from the NRL. On 27 November, the Canberra Raiders announced that Lewis had joined the Raiders coaching team as the coach for the Raiders NSW Cup squad.

== Controversy ==
In September 2021, a video was leaked to the media which showed Lewis along with Melbourne teammates Cameron Munster and Brandon Smith partying whilst Smith was taking an illicit substance which was alleged to be cocaine.

On 5 October 2021, Lewis was handed a $10,000 suspended fine and a one match suspension.
