= Illawarra RLFC =

Defunct Australian rugby league club, based in Illawarra, NSW

Illawarra Cutters

Club information
- Full name: Illawarra Rugby League Football Club
- Nickname: The Cutters
- Colours: Red; White
- Founded: 2012; 14 years ago
- Exited: 2017; 9 years ago

Former details
- Ground: Wollongong Showground (20,000)
- Coach: Mathew Head
- Captain: Jay Gallagher
- Competition: New South Wales Cup
- 2017: 8th
- Current season

Records
- Premierships: 1 (2016)
- NRL State Championship: 1 (2016)

The Illawarra Rugby League Football Club was an Australian rugby league football club based in Illawarra formed in 2012. Originally known as the Illawarra Cutters, they became known as the Illawarra RLFC before the 2017 Intrust Super Premiership NSW.

They won their first and only premiership title with the 2016 against Mount Pritchard Mounties at Parramatta Stadium. This was the final game ever played at this venue.

On 2 October 2016, Illawarra played in the NRL State Championship against Queensland Cup winners the Burleigh Bears. Illawarra went on to win the final 54-12.

Illawarra finished the 2017 Intrust Super Premiership NSW season in 8th place and qualified for the finals. In the first week they faced off against The Mount Pritchard Mounties, the team they played in The Grand Final of 2016. Illawarra won that match and went on to face Canterbury the following week. On 10 September 2017, Illawarra's premiership defense and season ended when they were defeated by Canterbury 32-14.

On October 27, 2017, it was announced that Illawarra would be replaced by the St George Illawarra Dragons for the 2018 Intrust Super Premiership NSW season as part of a restructure in the competition. It will be the first time since 2007 that a full St George Illawarra Dragons side will feature in the reserve grade competition. The approach brings the club in line with the NRL's ‘whole of game’ strategy that will also see top-grade squads increased from 25 players to 30. Club director of rugby league pathways Ian Millward said of the change “There's obviously a lot of changes in rugby league at the moment, one of the changes we’ve made is that the reserve grade team is St George Illawarra,” Millward said. “What it gives us is a clear pathway where younger players aspire to be Dragons right through to our first grade squad. There's a clear acknowledgment for coaches, training staff and players that when they're in our environment they are a part of the St George Illawarra Dragons".

== Notable players ==
- Leeson Ah Mau
- Euan Aitken
- Ray Cashmere
- Damien Cook
- Michael Crockett
- Matthew Dufty
- Kalifa Faifai Loa
- Dylan Farrell
- Yaw Kiti Glymin
- David Gower
- Jarrad Hickey
- Jacob Host
- Drew Hutchison
- Denan Kemp
- Rhys Kennedy
- Cameron King
- Michael Korkidas
- Blake Lawrie
- Chris Lewis
- Tyrone McCarthy
- Rory O'Brien
- Russell Packer
- Luke Page
- Adam Quinlan
- Henry Raiwalui
- Hame Sele
- Harry Siejka
- Jeremy Smith
- Joshua Toole
- Taioalo Vaivai
- Shannon Wakeman
- Blake Wallace

== See also ==
- National Rugby League reserves affiliations
- List of rugby league clubs in Australia
