= Mount Pritchard Mounties =

Australian rugby league club

Mounties RLFC

Club information
- Full name: Mounties Rugby League Football Club
- Nickname: Mounties
- Colours: Yellow; Black; White
- Founded: 1927; 99 years ago

Current details
- Ground: Aubrey Keech Reserve (10,000)
- Coach: Dane Dorahy Ron Massey Cup Grant Mitchell Sydney Shield
- Competition: Ron Massey Cup; Sydney Shield; Parramatta Junior Rugby League; NSWRL Women's Premiership

The Mounties Rugby League Football Club (sponsored by Mounties Group) is an Australian rugby league football club based in Mount Pritchard, New South Wales formed in 1927. They currently play in the Ron Massey Cup and Sydney Shield.

== Recent Seasons ==
=== 2015 ===
In 2015, Mounties defeated the Asquith Magpies to win the Ron Massey Cup 30–14.

=== 2016 ===
Mounties achieved a rare feat in 2016 by having all 3 grades NSW Cup, Ron Massey Cup and the Sydney Shield finish first in the regular season and win the minor premiership. Not since 1985 had a club finished top of all 3 grades to claim the minor premiership in the same year. The last team to do so before this was the St. George Dragons. Mounties also finished the season with all 3 grades making the grand final. The Sydney shield side was defeated by East Campbelltown Eagles, the Ron Massey Cup side won against St Mary's Saints and Illawarra Cutters defeated Mounties in the NSW Cup grand final.

=== 2017 ===
Mounties finished 5th in the Intrust Super Premiership NSW season. On 3 September 2017, Mounties faced off against Illawarra in the elimination final which was a rematch from last years Grand Final. Mounties went on to be defeated by Illawarra 30–26 and were eliminated. On 24 September 2017, the Sydney Shield side made it to the grand final against St Mary's but lost the match 34–20. On 24 October 2017, coach Steve Antonelli announced he was leaving the club after five years in charge to join Canterbury as assistant coach to Dean Pay. On 5 December 2017, Mounties announced that Ryan Carr would be new head coach of the Intrust Super Premiership NSW side for The 2018 season.

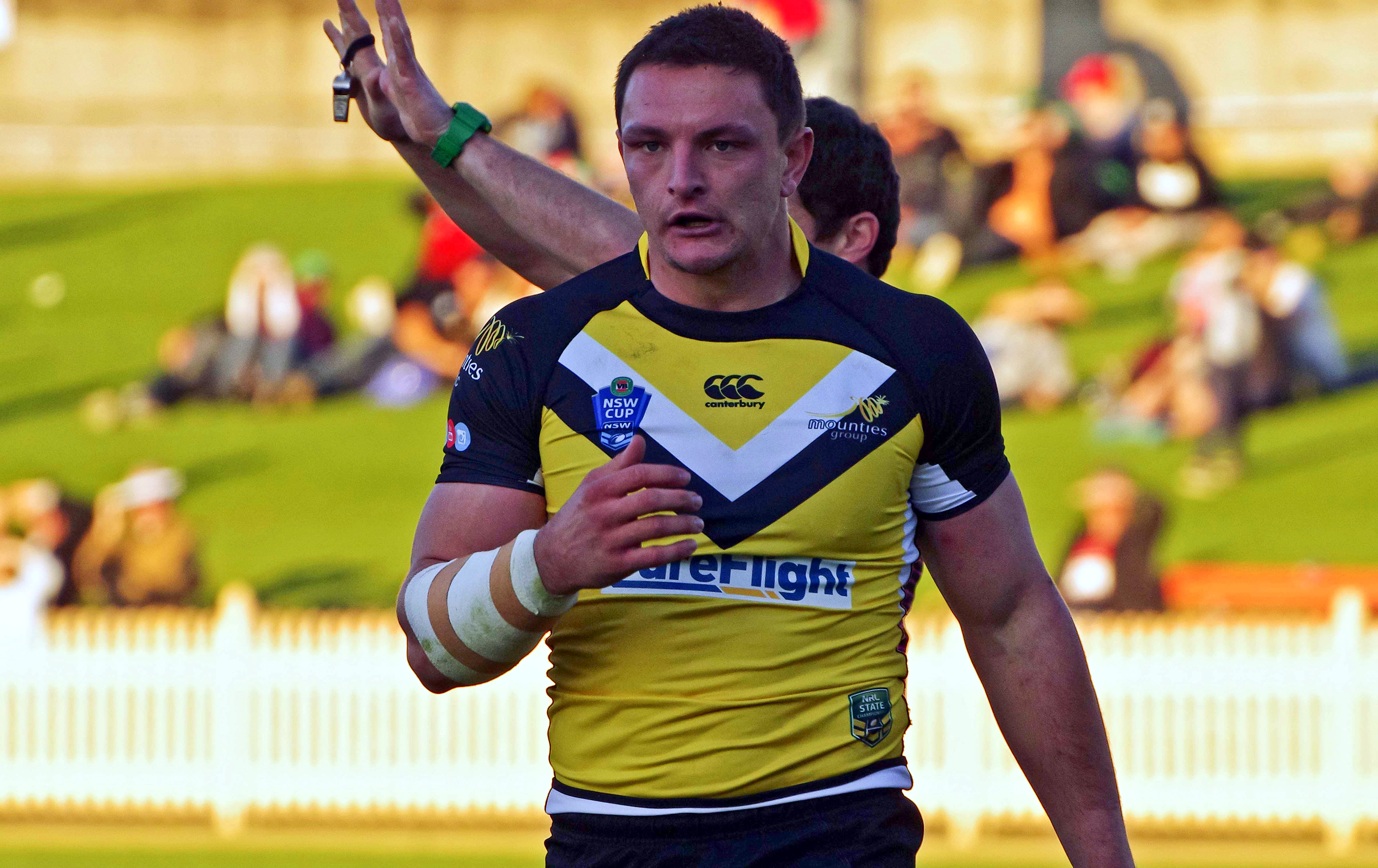
Jeff Lynch playing for Mounties

=== 2018 ===
Mounties qualified for the 2018 Intrust Super Premiership NSW finals series finishing 6th on the table. Mounties progressed the second week on the final series where they were defeated 34–16 by Newtown ending their season. The Mounties Ron Massey Cup team also made it to the second week of the finals series but were defeated 20–14 by the Concord-Glebe Wolves.

=== 2019 ===
Mounties finished the 2019 Canterbury Cup NSW season in sixth place on the table and qualified for the finals. Mounties were eliminated in week one of the finals series as they were defeated by Newtown 44–20 at Campbelltown Stadium.

The Ron Massey Cup side also qualified for the finals and reached the preliminary final but were defeated 22-12 by Wentworthville at Kogarah Oval.

=== 2020 ===
Mounties entered in the Canterbury Cup and Ron Massey Cup competitions, however both were cancelled after one round due to the COVID-19 pandemic in Australia.

In August 2020, it was announced that Mounties had joined forces with NRL side Canterbury-Bankstown to act as their feeder club side in the Canterbury Cup NSW competition for the next two years starting in 2021.

=== 2022 ===
Mounties finished 9th on the table during the 2022 NSW Cup season. The Ron Massey Cup side had a slightly better season finishing 5th on the table.

=== 2023 ===
In 2023, Mount Pritchard pulled out of the NSW Cup competition but continued to field sides in the Ron Massey Cup and Sydney Shield. In the Ron Massey Cup, Mounties finished second last. In the Sydney Shield, Mounties finished sixth on the table.

=== 2024 ===
In 2024, Mount Pritchard's Ron Massey Cup team finished second on the table but were knocked out in the second week of the finals series. The Sydney Shield side finished third on the table in their respective competition.

=== 2025 ===
In 2025, both Mounties Ron Massey Cup and Sydney Shield sides reached the finals in their respective competitions.

== NRL Juniors ==
- Arthur Summons (1960–64 Western Suburbs)
- Bob O'Reilly (1967–82 Parramatta Eels, Penrith Panthers & Eastern Suburbs)
- Geoff Gerard (1974–89 Parramatta Eels, Manly-Warringah & Penrith Panthers)
- Eric Grothe, Sr. (1979–89 Parramatta Eels)
- Steve Ella (1979–88 Parramatta Eels)
- Brad Fittler (1989–2004 Penrith Panthers & Sydney Roosters)
- Lenny Beckett (1999–2002 Newcastle Knights & Northern Eagles)
- Eric Grothe Jr (1999–2010 Parramatta Eels & Sydney Roosters)
- Shane Shackleton (2005–12 Sydney Roosters, Parramatta Eels & Penrith Panthers)
- Tony Williams (2008 Parramatta Eels, Manly-Warringah, Canterbury-Bankstown Bulldogs & Cronulla Sutherland Sharks)
- Shannon Boyd (2014–20 Canberra Raiders, Gold Coast Titans)
- Nathan Davis (2016–17 Parramatta Eels, Gold Coast Titans)
- Tevita Funa (2020– Manly-Warringah)
- Josh Schuster (2020– Manly-Warringah)

== Honours ==
- Intrust Super Premiership NSW Minor Premiers:

2015, 2016

- Ron Massey Cup Premiership:

2015, 2016

- Ron Massey Cup Minor Premiers:

2014

- Sydney Shield Minor Premiers:

2016, 2017

- NSWRL Women's Premiership Premiers:

2018, 2023

== Playing Record in NSWRL Competitions ==
=== NSW Cup ===
Year	Competition	Ladder			Finals Position	All Match Record						
Year	Competition	Pos	Byes	Pts	Finals Position	P	W	L	D	For	Agst	Diff
2012	NSW Cup	9	2	29		24	12	11	1	637	616	21
2013	NSW Cup	10	2	24		24	10	14	0	541	618	-77
2014	NSW Cup	5	2	32	Top 8 Elimination Semi-Finalist	25	14	11	0	720	571	149
2015	NSW Cup	1	3	36	Last 4 Preliminary Finalist	24	15	7	2	722	533	189
2016	Intrust Super NSW Premiership	1	3	44	Grand Finalist	28	21	4	0	683	504	179
2017	Intrust Super NSW Premiership	5	3	30	Top 8 Elimination Semi-Finalist	23	11	10	2	549	498	51
2018	Intrust Super NSW Premiership	6	2	26	Last 6 Semi-Finalist	24	12	12	0	569	515	54
2019	Canterbury Cup	6	1	25	Top 8 Elimination Semi-Finalist	23	11	11	1	604	559	45
2020	Canterbury Cup	N/A	0	2	Competition Cancelled	1	1	0	0	44	30	14

=== Ron Massey Cup ===
The club has had two stints in third tier NSWRL competitions - initially in the early 1990s and from 2007 to the present.

Year	Competition	Ladder			Finals Position	All Match Record						
Year	Competition	Pos	Byes	Pts	Finals Position	P	W	L	D	For	Agst	Diff
1990	Metropolitan Cup	6		10								
1991	Metropolitan Cup											
1992	Metropolitan Cup	6	2	20		16	8	8	0	279	307	-28
1993	Metropolitan Cup	8	2	13		16	4	11	1	248	356	-108
1994	Metropolitan Cup	6	0	17		21	8	12	1	319	516	-197
2007	Jim Beam Cup	7	0	20		22	10	12	0	610	541	69
2008	Jim Beam Cup	3	0	32	Finalist	25	17	8	0	782	602	180
2009	Bundaberg Red Cup	4	0	23	Semi-Finalist	20	12	7	1	546	469	77
2010	Bundaberg Red Cup	3	0	24	Semi-Finalist	23	12	11	0	550	617	-67
2011	Bundaberg Red Cup	2	0	36	Grand Finalist	24	20	4	0	791	442	349
2012	Bundaberg Red Cup	6	0	22		18	11	7	0	642	471	171
2013	Ron Massey Cup	2	0	33	Grand Finalist	26	18	7	1	877	517	360
2014	Ron Massey Cup	2	0	29	Grand Finalist	25	16	8	1	761	531	230
2015	Ron Massey Cup	1	2	40	Premiers	24	21	3	0	824	374	450
2016	Ron Massey Cup	1	2	36	Premiers	24	19	5	0	810	381	429
2017	Ron Massey Cup	4	7	34	Last 6 Semi-Finalist	20	9	9	2	486	388	98
2018	Ron Massey Cup	2	2	30	Last 6 Semi-Finalist	20	12	6	2	456	313	143
2019	Ron Massey Cup	3	2	34	Last 4 Preliminary Finalist	23	16	7	0	719	381	338
2020	Ron Massey Cup	N/A	0	0	Competition Cancelled	1	1	0	0	30	4	26

=== Sydney Shield ===
Year	Competition	Ladder			Finals Position	All Match Record						
Year	Competition	Pos	Byes	Pts	Finals Position	P	W	L	D	For	Agst	Diff
2014	Sydney Shield	6	0	22	Grand Finalist	24	11	11	2	620	687	-67
2015	Sydney Shield	4	2	30	Last 6 Semi-Finalist	22	13	9	0	662	567	95
2016	Sydney Shield	1	0	40	Grand Finalist	25	22	3	0	1108	424	684
2017	Sydney Shield	1	3	44	Grand Finalist	26	21	5	0	904	417	487

== See also ==
- National Rugby League reserves affiliations
- List of rugby league clubs in Australia
- Rugby league in New South Wales
