= Kurt Mann =

Australian rugby league footballer

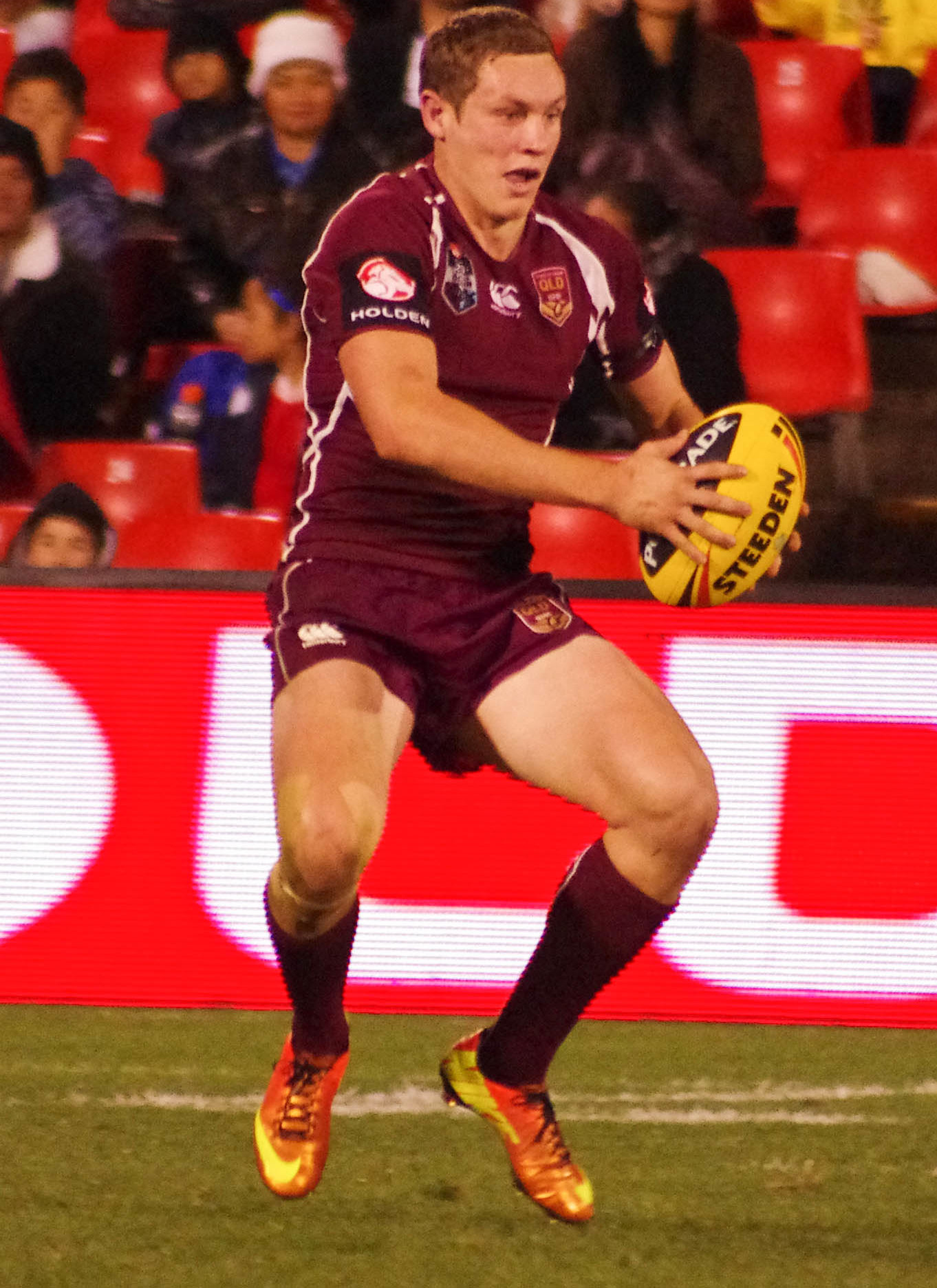

Personal information
- Born: 1 March 1993 (age 33) Winton, Queensland, Australia
- Height: 184 cm (6 ft 0 in)
- Weight: 88 kg (13 st 12 lb)

Playing information
- Position: Centre, Five-eighth, Lock, Wing
Club
Years	Team	Pld	T	G	FG	P
2014–15	Melbourne Storm	28	10	0	0	40
2016–18	St. George Illawarra	60	20	0	0	80
2019–23	Newcastle Knights	90	15	0	1	61
2024–26	Canterbury Bulldogs	57	4	0	0	16
2027	Wests Tigers	0	0	0	0	0
	Total	235	49	0	1	197
Representative
Years	Team	Pld	T	G	FG	P
2025	Queensland	2	0	0	0	0
- Source: As of 22 August 2026

Kurt Mann (born 1 March 1993) is an Australian professional rugby league footballer who currently plays for the Wests Tigers in the National Rugby League. A utility player, he has started games in the positions of centre, fullback, wing, five-eighth and lock.

He previously played for the Melbourne Storm, St. George Illawarra Dragons ,Newcastle Knights and Canterbury Bulldogs in the National Rugby League.

== Background ==
Mann was born in Winton, Queensland, Australia and was educated at St. Brendan's College, Yeppoon.

Mann played his junior rugby league for the Winton Diamantina Devils, before being signed by the Newcastle Knights.

== Playing career ==
=== Early career ===
In 2011 and 2012, Mann played for the Newcastle Knights' NYC team.

On 21 April 2012, he played for the Queensland under-20s team against the New South Wales under-20s team.

On 20 June 2012, he signed a three-year contract with the Melbourne Storm starting in 2013. He played for the Storm's NYC team in 2013.

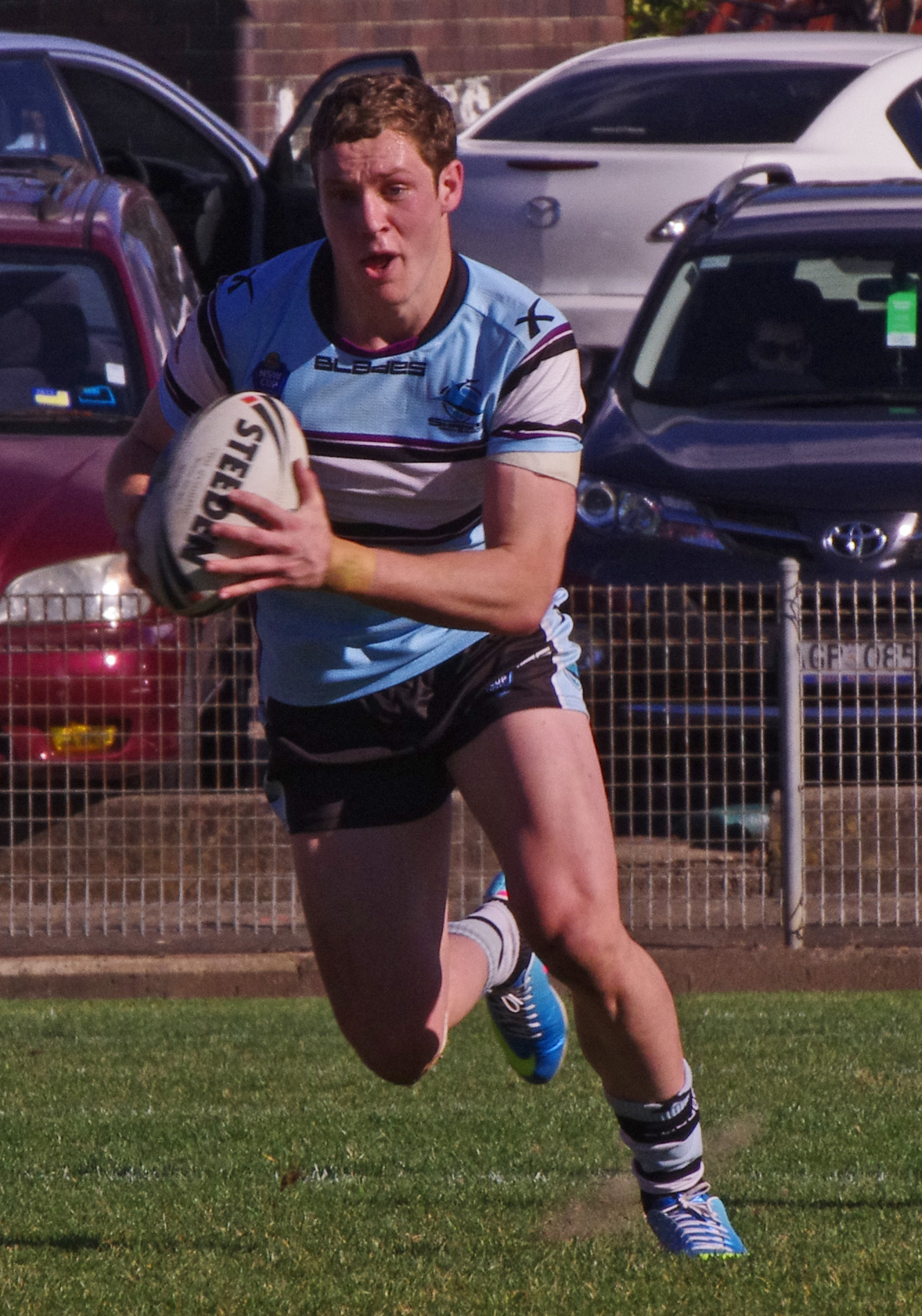
Mann playing for the Cronulla-Sutherland Sharks team in 2013

On 20 April 2013, he again played for the Queensland under-20s team against the New South Wales under-20s team.

=== 2014 ===
In 2014, Mann moved on to Melbourne's New South Wales Cup team, the Cronulla-Sutherland Sharks. In February 2014, he played for Melbourne in the inaugural NRL Auckland Nines. In round 9 of the 2014 NRL season, he made his NRL debut for the Melbourne Storm, against Manly-Warringah. He played at centre and scored the match winning try on debut, in Melbourne's 22-19 win at AAMI Park. He finished off his debut year in the NRL having played in 8 matches and scored 6 tries. Furthermore, he was the awarded 2014 Melbourne Storm Rookie of the Year.

=== 2015 ===
On 31 January and 1 February, Mann played in the Melbourne club's 2015 NRL Auckland Nines campaign. On 1 July 2015, he signed a two-year contract with the St. George Illawarra Dragons, starting in 2016. He finished off his last year with the Storm by playing in 20 matches and scoring 4 tries.

=== 2016 ===
In February, Mann played for St. George Illawarra in the 2016 NRL Auckland Nines.

In round 1 of the 2016 NRL season, he made his club debut for St. George Illawarra against his former club, Melbourne, playing at fullback in the Saints 16-18 loss at AAMI Park. In round 12, against the North Queensland Cowboys, he scored his first try for St. George Illawarra. He was the club's leading try-scorer for the season with ten tries. Mann was a member of the Illawarra side which won the 2016 NSW Cup with a 21-20 victory over Mounties in the final.

=== 2017 ===
Mann was named in St. George Illawarra's squad for the 2017 NRL Auckland Nines. He played in 21 games, scoring 7 tries for St. George Illawarra in the 2017 season.

=== 2018 ===
Mann played in 26 games and scored three tries for St. George Illawarra in the 2018 season. In December, he was granted a release from the final year of his St. George contract, to return to the Newcastle Knights on a three-year contract starting in 2019.

=== 2019 ===
Mann played 19 games and scored five tries for Newcastle in the 2019 NRL season as the club finished a disappointing 11th on the table. At the start of the year, many tipped Newcastle to reach the finals after the club recruited heavily in the off-season.

=== 2020 ===
He made 17 appearances for Newcastle in the 2020 NRL season including the club's first finals game since 2013 which was an elimination finals loss against South Sydney.

=== 2021 ===
Mann played 22 games for Newcastle in the 2021 NRL season including the club's elimination finals loss against Parramatta.

=== 2022 ===
Mann played a total of eleven matches for Newcastle in the 2022 NRL season as the club finished 14th on the table and missed the finals.

=== 2023 ===
On 2 May, it was announced that Mann would be ruled out indefinitely from playing after suffering a torn oblique muscle in Newcastle's loss to Parramatta.

After playing 90 games for the Newcastle Knights, Mann parted ways with the club at the end of the 2023 season. On 8 November, he signed a two-year contract to join Canterbury ahead of the 2024 NRL season.

=== 2024 ===
In round 1 of the 2024 NRL season, Mann made his club debut for Canterbury in their 26-8 loss against arch-rivals Parramatta. On 2 September, it was announced that Mann would be ruled out for the remainder of the 2024 season after suffering a fractured clavicle.

=== 2025 ===
In March, Mann re-signed with the Canterbury club until the end of the 2026 season. In May, he was selected by Queensland for the 2025 State of Origin series for the second game. He played in game two and three for Queensland off the bench as they upset New South Wales 2-1 to win the series. Mann played 22 matches for Canterbury in the 2025 NRL season as the club finished fourth and qualified for the finals. Canterbury would be eliminated from the finals in straight sets.

=== 2026 ===
Mann played 18 matches for Canterbury in the 2026 NRL season as the club finished 12th on the table and missed out on the finals. On 2 October 2026, Wests Tigers announced that they had signed Mann on a one year deal.

== Statistics ==
Year	Team	Games	Tries	FGs	Pts
2014	Melbourne Storm	8	6		24
2015	Melbourne Storm	20	4		16
2016	St. George Illawarra Dragons	13	10		40
2017	St. George Illawarra Dragons	21	7		28
2018	St. George Illawarra Dragons	26	3		12
2019	Newcastle Knights	19	1		4
2020	Newcastle Knights	20	6		24
2021	Newcastle Knights	22	3	1	13
2022	Newcastle Knights	11	1		4
2023	Newcastle Knights	18	4		16
2024	Canterbury-Bankstown Bulldogs	17	2		8
2025	Canterbury-Bankstown Bulldogs	22	2		8
2026	Canterbury-Bankstown Bulldogs	18			
2027	Wests Tigers				
	Totals	235	49	1	197
