= 1929 NSWRFL season =

Rugby league competition

1929 New South Wales Rugby Football League
- Teams: 9
- Premiers: South Sydney (9th title)
- Minor premiers: South Sydney (8th title)
- Matches played: 75
- Points scored: 1942
- Top points scorer(s): Jim Craig (86)
- Wooden spoon: University (4th spoon)
- Top try-scorer(s): Alan Brady (11)

The 1929 New South Wales Rugby Football League premiership was the 22nd season of Sydney's top-level rugby league football competition, Australia's first. During the season, which lasted from April until September, nine teams from across Sydney contested the premiership, culminating in a South Sydney's win over Newtown in the final.

== Season summary ==
Half of the 1929 season was played without several of the League's top players who were selected to embark on the 1929–30 Kangaroo tour of Great Britain. South Sydney won their ninth premiership and fifth in succession, defeating Newtown in the Final.

=== Teams ===
At the end of 1929 Glebe exited the League because of a lack of a home ground, poor results and primarily because the area they represented was no longer big enough to support a club.

- Balmain, formed on January 23, 1908, at Balmain Town Hall
- Eastern Suburbs, formed on January 24, 1908, at Paddington Town Hall
- Glebe, formed on January 9, 1908
- Newtown, formed on January 8, 1908
- North Sydney, formed on February 7, 1908
- South Sydney, formed on January 17, 1908, at Redfern Town Hall
- St. George, formed on November 8, 1920, at Kogarah School of Arts
- Western Suburbs, formed on February 4, 1908
- University, formed in 1919 at Sydney University

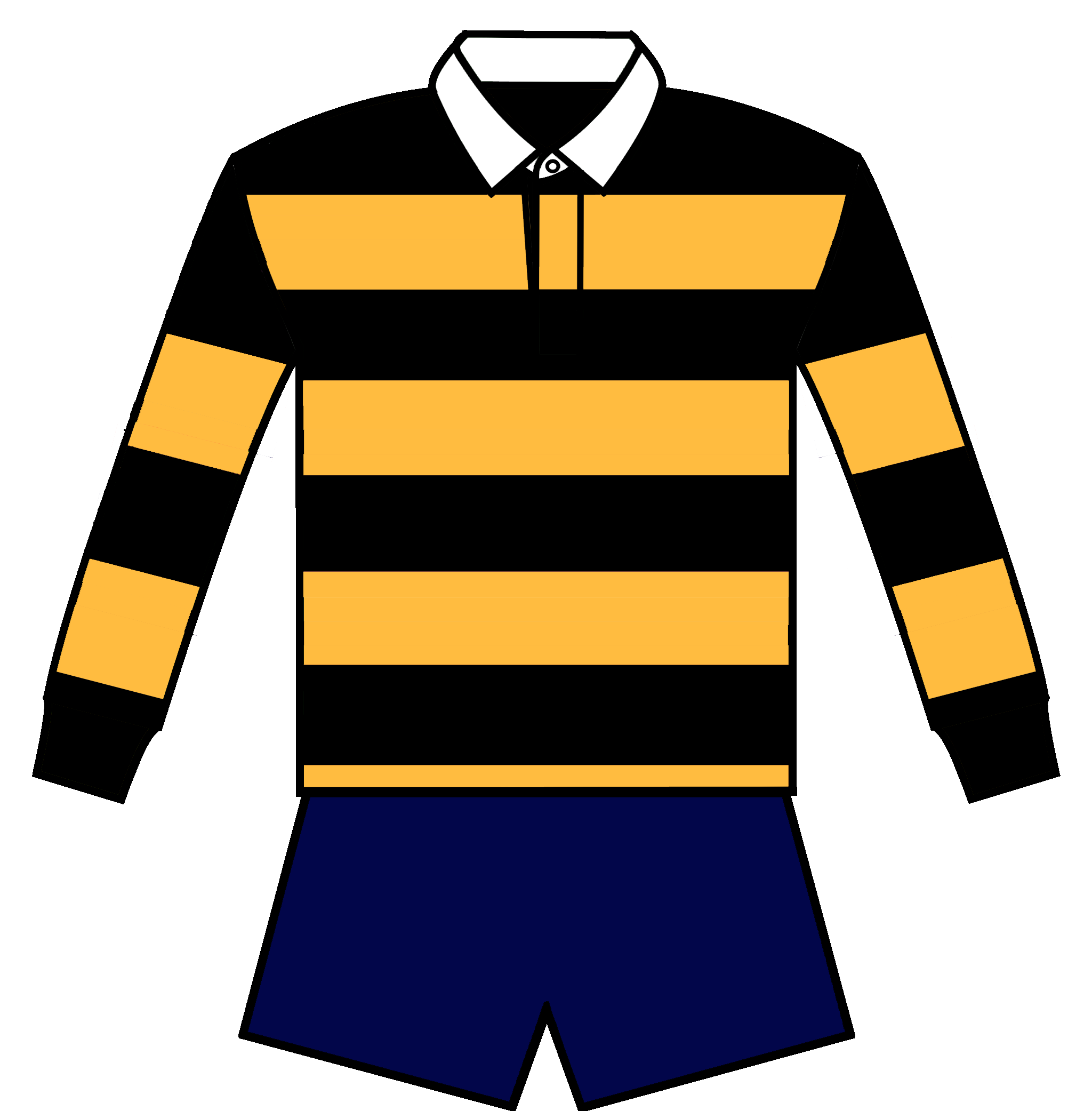
Balmain 22nd season Ground: Birchgrove Oval; Captain-Coach: Reg Latta

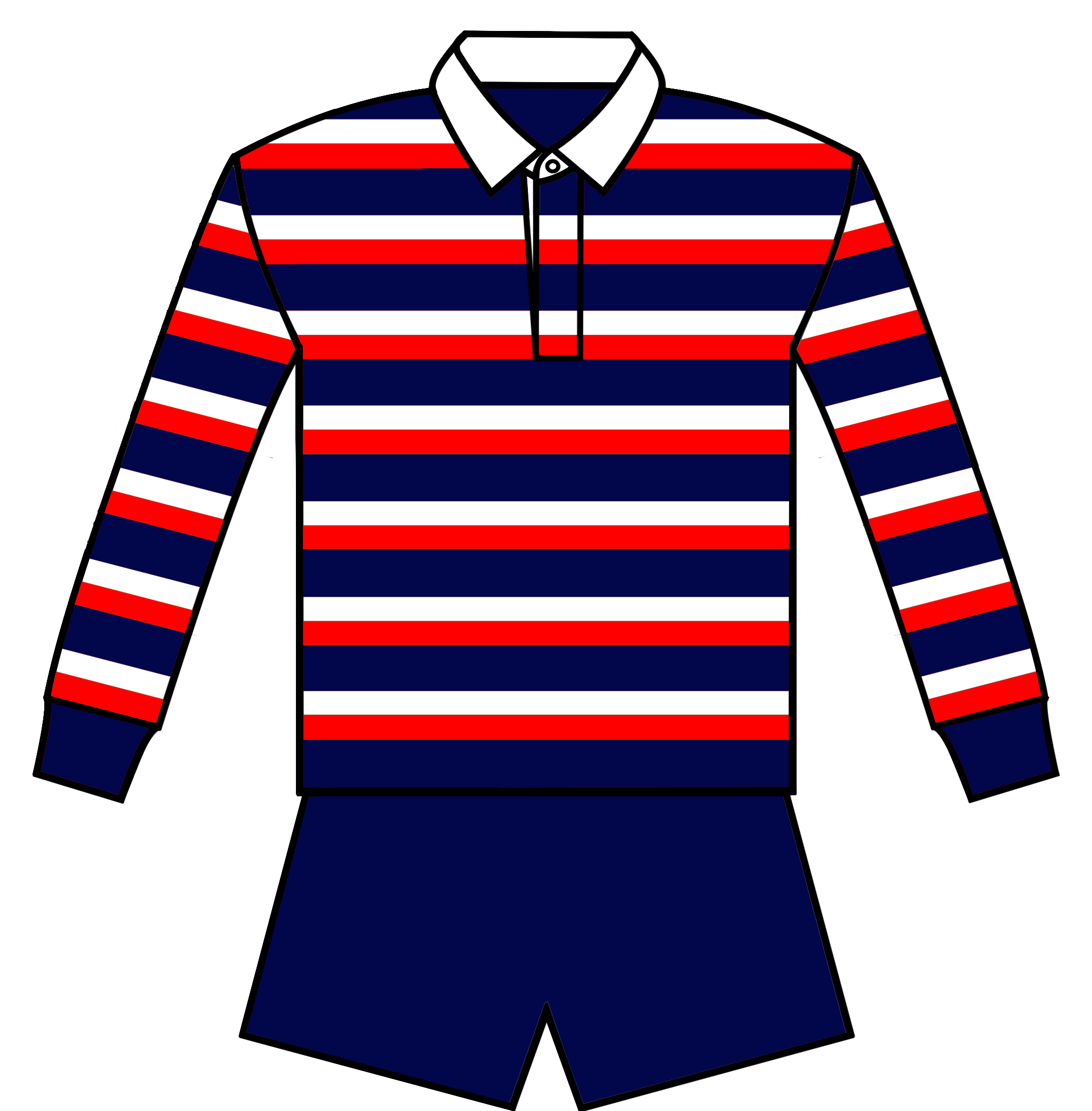
Eastern Suburbs 22nd season Ground: RAS Showground; Coach: George Boddington; Captain: Arthur Oxford

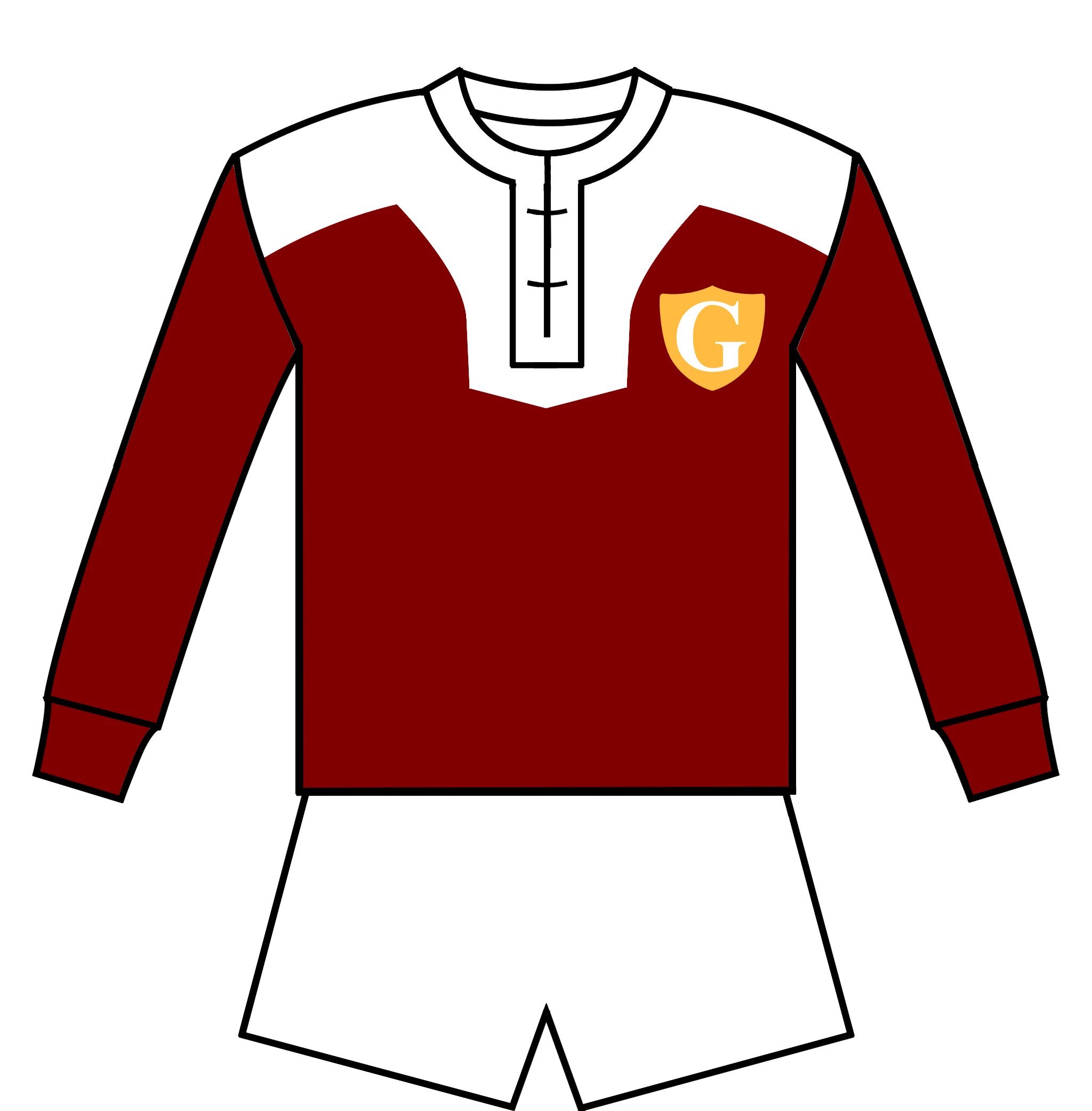
Glebe 22nd season Ground: Wentworth Park; Coach: Chris McKivat; Captain: Jack McMahon

Newtown 22nd season Ground: Marrickville Oval; Coach: Jack Chaseling; Captain(s): Tom Ellis, Fred Lind

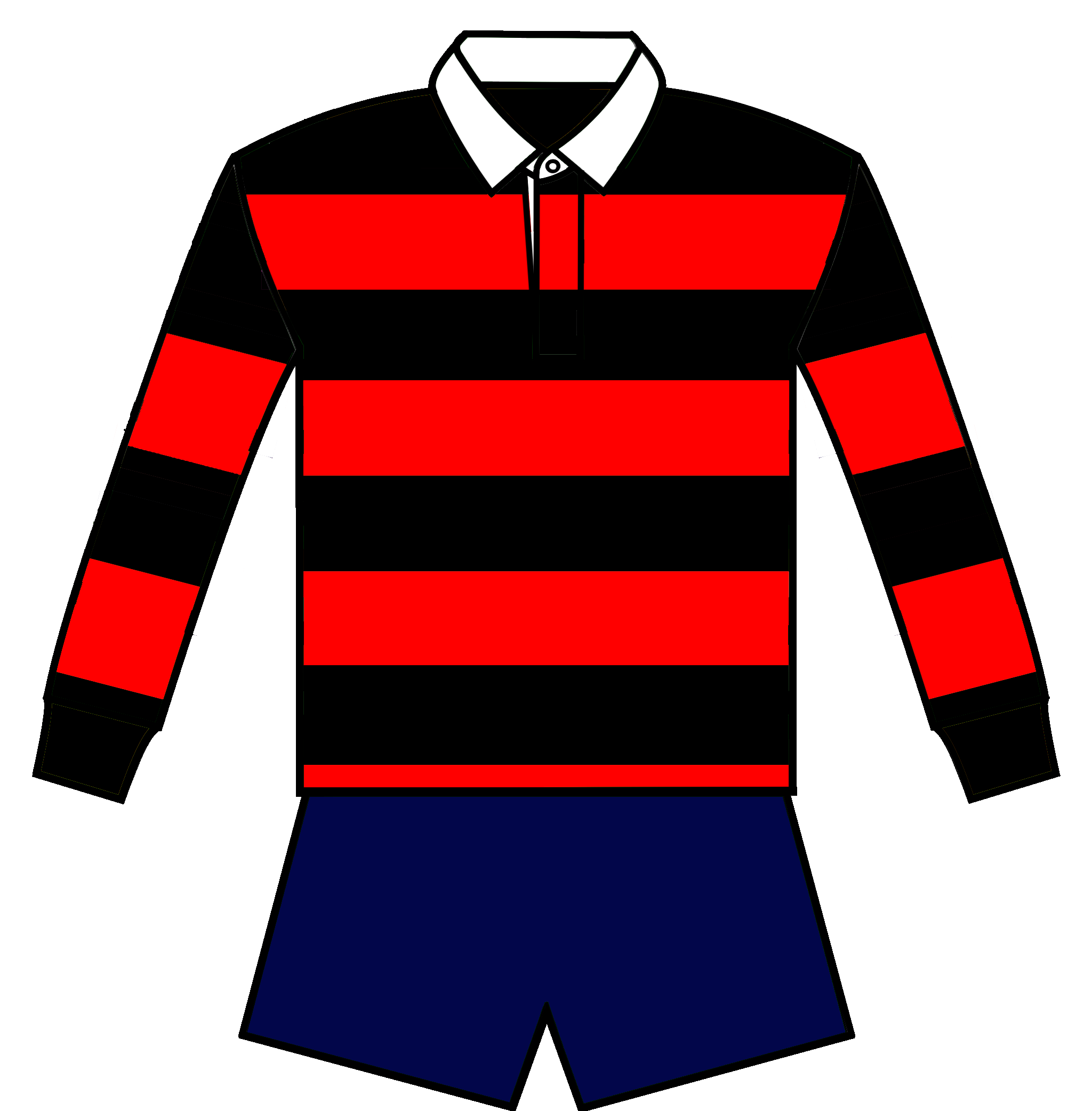
North Sydney 22nd season Ground: North Sydney Oval; Coach: Leo O'Connor; Captain: Les Carroll

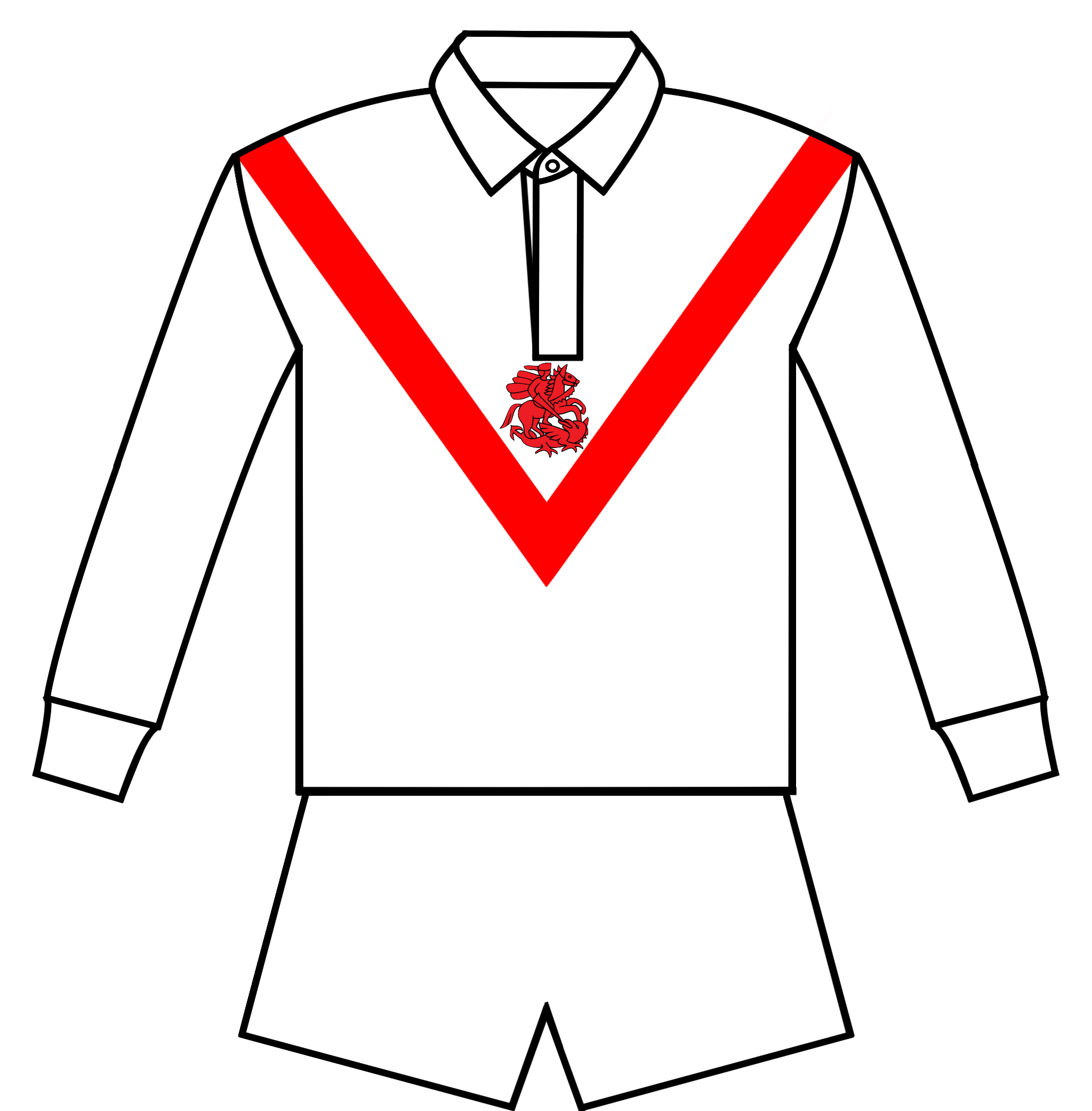
St. George 9th season Ground: Earl Park; Coach: Frank Burge; Captain: Arthur Justice

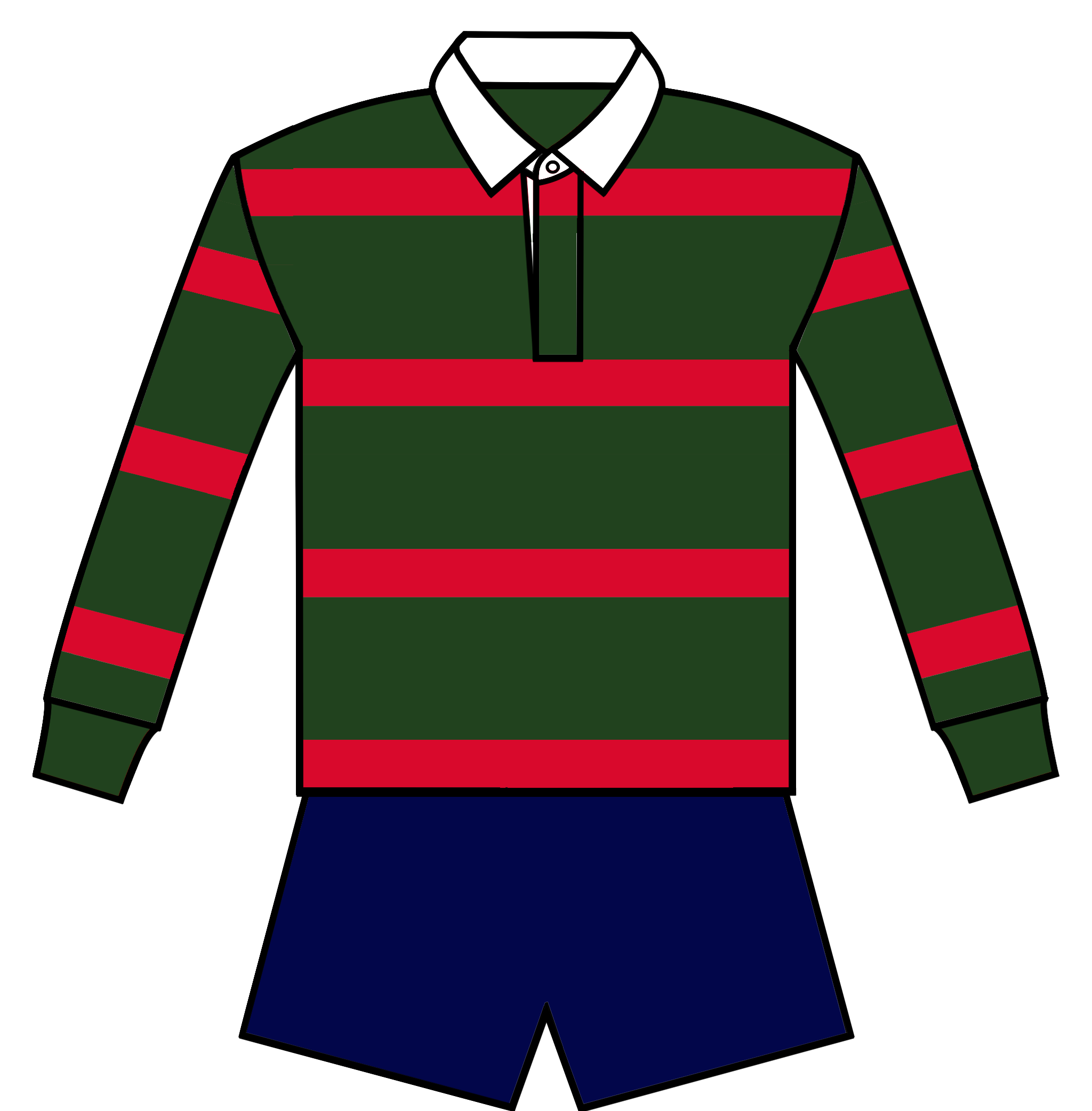
South Sydney 22nd season Ground: Sydney Sports Ground; Coach: Charlie Lynch; Captain: Alf Blair

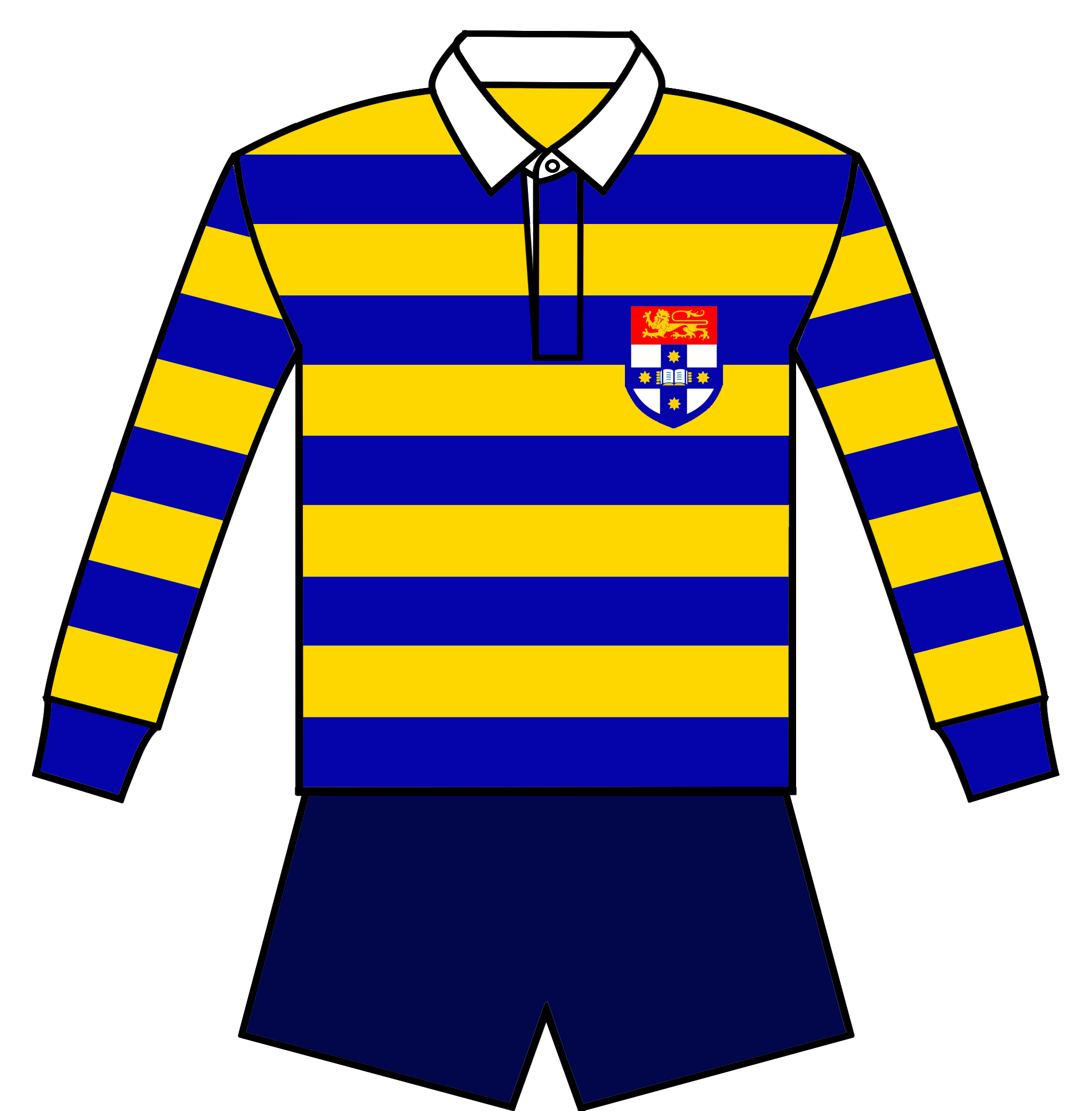
University 10th season Coach:Billy Kelly; Captain: Sammy Ogg

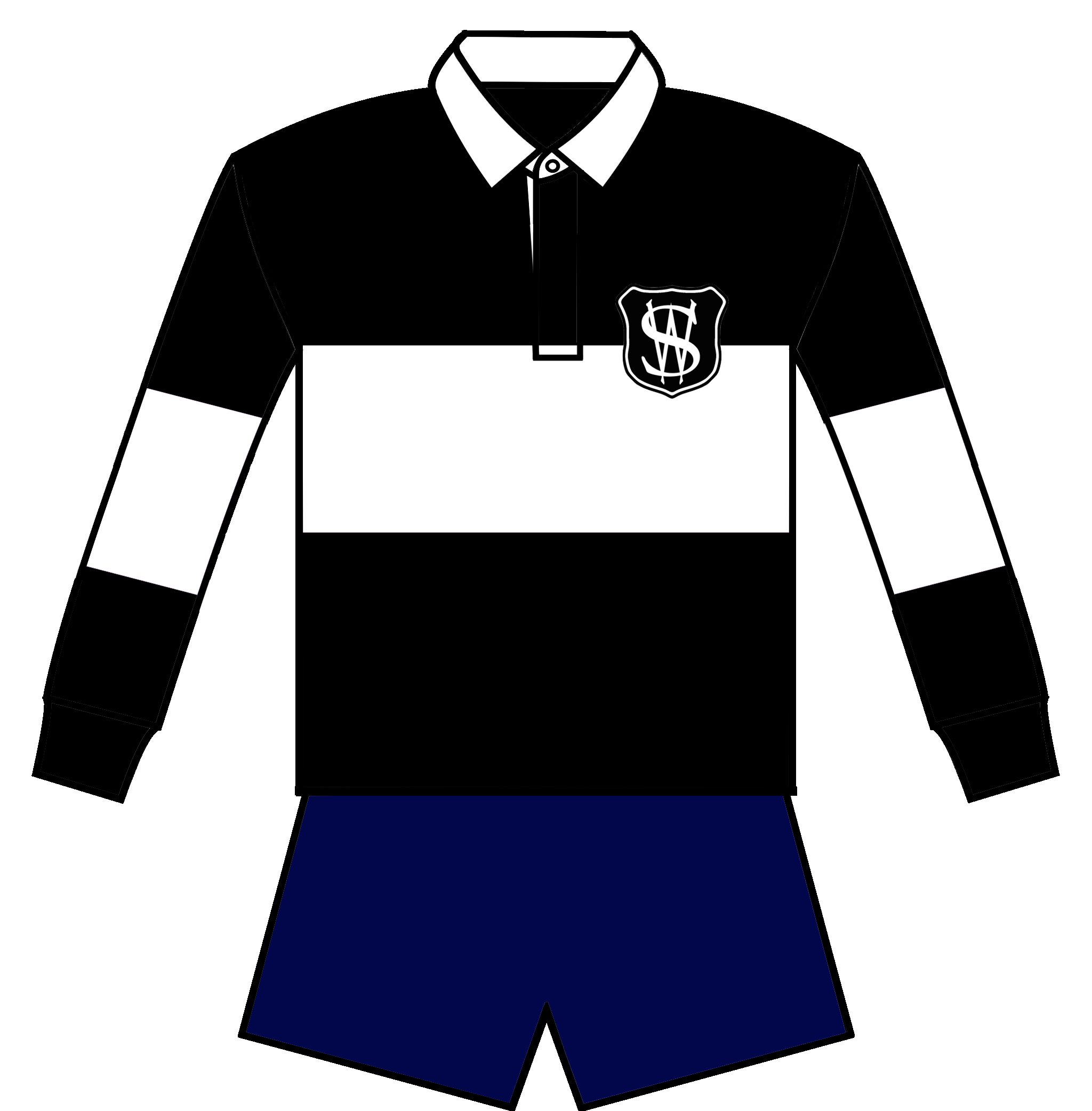
Western Suburbs 22nd season Ground: Pratten Park; Captain-Coach: Jim Craig

=== Ladder ===
	Team	Pld	W	D	L	B	PF	PA	PD	Pts
1	South Sydney	16	13	1	2	2	296	104	+192	31
2	St. George	16	11	1	4	2	180	147	+33	27
3	Western Suburbs	16	10	2	4	2	258	153	+105	26
4	Newtown	16	10	0	6	2	188	169	+19	24
5	North Sydney	16	6	3	7	2	194	211	-17	19
6	Balmain	16	6	1	9	2	213	259	-46	17
7	Eastern Suburbs	16	4	2	10	2	203	269	-66	14
8	Glebe	16	3	3	10	2	166	261	-95	13
9	Sydney University	16	2	1	13	2	157	282	-125	9

== Finals ==
Home	Score	Away	Match Information
Home	Score	Away	Date and Time	Venue	Referee	Crowd
Minor Semi-Final
Newtown	8–7	St. George	7 September 1929	Earl Park		7,000
Major Semi-Final
South Sydney	22–10	Western Suburbs	7 September 1929	Sydney Sports Ground	Lal Deane	14,774
Final
South Sydney	30–10	Newtown	14 September 1929	Sydney Sports Ground	Lal Deane	16,360

=== Premiership final ===
South Sydney	Position	Newtown
47. Albert Spillane	FB	20. Jim Gilmour
9. Benny Wearing	WG	25. George Casey
15. Oscar Quinlivan	CE	10. Carl Mork
34. Harry Eyres	CE	18.Charlie Hill
35. Reg Williams	WG	9. Jack Kessey (c)
28. Jack Jones	FE	23. Vince Hughes
11. Alf Blair (c)	HB	7. Hans Mork
1. Frank O'Connor	PR	16. Charlie Pendergast
5. Alf O'Connor	HK	8. Tom Leamy
24. Carl Eggen	PR	32. Ben Edwards
2. Alf Binder	SR	3. Dave Waters
7. David Watson	SR	51. Jack Davies
8. Jack Why	LK	5. T Walsh
Charlie Lynch	Coach	

South Sydney took their fifth successive title outgunning Newtown 30–10 after leading 18–2 at half-time.

The Whiticker/Collis reference quotes Sydney's Labor Daily in praise of Souths' win: "Newtown faced inevitable defeat, and while the margin was large, it hardly demonstrated South Sydney's superiority. They were on top from the start and gave a scintillating display both in combination and individual effort. Alf Blair played probably the greatest game in his long career".

Brothers Alf and Frank O'Connor both scored tries for the winning Rabbitohs. The next time two brothers would each score a try in a premiership decider was when Brett and Glenn Stewart scored for Manly-Warringah in their 2011 NRL Grand Final win over New Zealand.

South Sydney 30 (Tries: Alf Blair 3, Reg Williams 3, Frank O'Connor, Alf O'Connor. Goals: Alf Blair 2, Reg Williams)

defeated

Newtown 10 (Tries: Ben Edwards 2. Goals: George Casey 2)

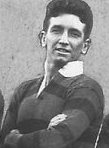
Alf O'Connor
