= 2014 NRL State Championship =

Penrith Panthers	Northern Pride
28	32
	1	2	Total
PEN	16	12	28
NOR	16	16	32
- Date: 5 October 2014
- Stadium: ANZ Stadium
- Location: Sydney
- Referee: Adam Cassidy

Broadcast partners
- Broadcasters: Nine Network
- Commentators: Mat Thompson Brad Fittler Wally Lewis

The 2014 National Rugby League State Championship is a rugby league match contested by 2014 NSW Cup premiers Penrith Panthers and 2014 Queensland Cup premiers the Northern Pride. The match is the inaugural edition of the NRL State Championship, an annual championship game staged to determine the title of NRL State Champions, and challenged by the premiers of the New South Wales Cup and the Queensland Cup. The Northern Pride won the match by 8 points, winning their first NRL State Championship title.

The match was played at ANZ Stadium as a curtain raiser match for the 2014 NRL Grand Final on 5 October 2014. The match was televised by the Nine Network and Fox Sports.

== Background ==
Penrith had entered the 2014 NRL State Championship by winning the 2014 New South Wales Cup Grand Final. After finishing first on the ladder during the 2014 NSW Cup season, recording only four losses out of 21 games, they entered the 2014 New South Wales Finals Series, winning all their matches including the Grand Final against the Newcastle Knights 48–12. The Northern Pride booked a place in the State Championship by winning the 2014 Queensland Cup Grand Final against the Easts Tigers 36–4. They also had recorded only four losses in their season, out of 24 in the 2014 Queensland Cup season, finishing first on the ladder. They entered the 2014 Queensland Cup Finals Series, winning against Easts in the major semi-final 8-7 and then again in the Grand Final.

Former Brisbane Broncos and Queensland State of Origin player Justin Hodges had endorsed the Northern Pride in a Cairns Post article before the match, stating, "They may be a Cowboys feeder team but everyone knows they are a Cairns team and a Queensland team. They are a strong side and are a classy side that is coached very well. They have been the benchmark of the Queensland competition for years so I know they’ll go well. There is only them and the Broncos under-20 from up here playing on grand final day. So I reckon everyone in Queensland will be cheering them on."

== Match details ==
Sunday, 5 October
3:50pm (AEDT)

Penrith Panthers 2014 NSW Cup Premiers	28 – 32	Northern Pride 2014 QLD Cup Premiers
Tries: Luke Capewell (17') 1 Eto Nabuli (24') 1 Waqa Blake (36') 1 Kierran Moseley (44') 1 Kieran Moss(51') 1 Goals: Wes Naiqama 4/5 (19', 26', 46', 53')	Half Time: 16–16	Tries: Javid Bowen (12', 31', 63') 3 Blake Leary (7') 1 Semi Tadulala (59') 1 Tyrone McCarthy (72') 1 Goals: Shaun Nona 2/5 (32', 40' pen); Javid Bowen 2/2 (65', 73')

ANZ Stadium, Sydney
Referee: Adam Cassidy

== See also ==
- 2014 New South Wales Cup season
- 2014 Queensland Cup season
