= 2014 Queensland Cup =

- Duration: March 1 – September 28, 2014
- Teams: 13
- Premiers: Northern Pride (2nd title)
- Minor premiers: Northern Pride (2nd title)
- Matches played: 162
- Points scored: 7,501
- Top points scorer: Khan Ahwang (197)
- Player of the year: Luke Page (Courier Mail Medal)
- Top try-scorer: Garry Lo (24)

The 2014 Queensland Cup season was the 19th season of Queensland's top-level statewide rugby league competition run by the Queensland Rugby League. The competition, known as the Intrust Super Cup due to sponsorship from Intrust Super, featured 13 teams playing a 30-week long season (including finals) from March to September.

The Northern Pride won their second premiership after defeating the Easts Tigers 36–4 in the Grand Final at Suncorp Stadium. Souths Logan Magpies' prop Luke Page was named the competition's Player of the Year, winning the Courier Mail Medal.

== Teams ==
In 2014, the competition expanded to the 13 teams with the inclusion of the PNG Hunters. The Hunters are the first Papua New Guinea-based club to play in the Queensland Cup since the Port Moresby Vipers, who took part in the 1996 and 1997 seasons. The Sunshine Coast Sea Eagles returned to their original name, the Sunshine Coast Falcons, and returned to their usual black and gold colour scheme.

The Canberra Raiders re-introduced their affiliation with the Souths Logan Magpies for the 2014 season.

Colours	Club	Home ground(s)	Head coach(s)	Captain(s)	NRL Affiliate
	Burleigh Bears	Pizzey Park	Carl Briggs → Jim Lenihan	Darren Griffiths	Gold Coast Titans
	Central Queensland Capras	Browne Park	Jason Hetherington	Gavin Hiscox	Brisbane Broncos
	Easts Tigers	Langlands Park	Craig Ingebrigtsen	Steven Thorpe	Melbourne Storm
	Ipswich Jets	North Ipswich Reserve	Ben Walker & Shane Walker	Keiron Lander	Brisbane Broncos
	Mackay Cutters	Stadium Mackay	Kim Williams	Tyson Martin	North Queensland Cowboys
	Northern Pride	Barlow Park	Jason Demetriou	Brett Anderson & Jason Roos	North Queensland Cowboys
	Norths Devils	Bishop Park	Mark Gliddon	Brendon Gibb	Brisbane Broncos
	Papua New Guinea Hunters	Kalabond Oval	Michael Marum	Israel Eliab	None
	Redcliffe Dolphins	Dolphin Oval	Troy Lindsay	Jon Green & Marty Hatfield	Brisbane Broncos
	Souths Logan Magpies	Davies Park	Josh Hannay	Phil Dennis	Canberra Raiders
	Sunshine Coast Falcons	Sunshine Coast Stadium	Ivan Henjak → Glen Dreger	Ryan Hansen	None
	Tweed Heads Seagulls	Piggabeen Sports Complex	Aaron Zimmerle	Matt King	Gold Coast Titans
	Wynnum Manly Seagulls	BMD Kougari Oval	Jon Buchanan	Tim Natusch	Brisbane Broncos

== Ladder ==
2014 Queensland Cup
Pos	Team	Pld	W	D	L	B	PF	PA	PD	Pts
1	Northern Pride (P)	24	20	0	4	2	677	414	263	44
2	Wynnum Manly Seagulls	24	17	0	7	2	690	400	290	38
3	Easts Tigers	24	16	1	7	2	667	409	258	37
4	Tweed Heads Seagulls	24	15	1	8	2	617	511	106	35
5	Ipswich Jets	24	15	0	9	2	642	514	128	34
6	Papua New Guinea Hunters	24	14	1	9	2	648	557	91	33
7	Burleigh Bears	24	11	1	12	2	549	599	-50	27
8	Norths Devils	24	11	0	13	2	572	544	28	26
9	Mackay Cutters	24	11	0	13	2	472	546	-74	26
10	Souths Logan Magpies	24	10	0	14	2	535	620	-85	24
11	Redcliffe Dolphins	24	8	1	15	2	566	617	-51	21
12	Central Queensland Capras	24	4	1	19	2	415	773	-358	13
13	Sunshine Coast Falcons	24	1	0	23	2	230	776	-546	6

== Regular season ==
The 2014 Queensland Cup regular season featured 26 rounds, with each team playing 24 games and receiving two byes.

== Final series ==
Home	Score	Away	Match Information
Home	Score	Away	Date and Time (Local)	Venue
Elimination / Qualifying Final
Tweed Heads Seagulls	10 – 28	Ipswich Jets	7 September 2014, 2:00 pm	Piggabeen Sports Complex
Wynnum Manly Seagulls	12 – 18	Easts Tigers	7 September 2014, 2:00 pm	BMD Kougari Oval
Major / Minor Semi-final
Northern Pride	8 – 7	Easts Tigers	13 September 2014, 5:30 pm	Barlow Park
Wynnum Manly Seagulls	34 – 22	Ipswich Jets	14 September 2014, 1:30 pm	BMD Kougari Oval
Preliminary Final
Easts Tigers	30 – 12	Wynnum Manly Seagulls	21 September 2014, 2:30 pm	Langlands Park
Grand Final
Northern Pride	36 – 4	Easts Tigers	28 September 2014, 3:55 pm	Suncorp Stadium

Qualifying / Elimination Finals
2	Wynnum Manly	12
3	Easts	18
4	Tweed Heads	10
5	Ipswich	28

Major / Minor Semi-finals
1	Northern Pride	8
Easts	7
Wynnum Manly	34
Ipswich	22

Preliminary Final
Easts	30
Wynnum Manly	12

Grand Final
Northern Pride	36
Easts	4

== Grand Final ==
Sunday, 28 September
3:55pm (AEST)

Northern Pride	36 – 4	Easts Tigers
Tries: Javid Bowen 2 Brett Anderson 1 Davin Crampton 1 Kyle Feldt 1 Ryan Ghietti 1 Goals: Shaun Nona 6	1st: 18 - 0; 2nd: 18 - 4 Report	Tries: 1 Jarrod McInally

Suncorp Stadium
Attendance: 7,135
Referee: Clayton Sharpe
Player of the Match: Shaun Nona (Northern Pride)

Northern Pride	Position	Easts Tigers
Hezron Murgha	FB	Cameron Munster
Javid Bowen	WG	Jarrod McInally
Brett Anderson (c)	CE	Shane Neumann
Kyle Feldt	CE	Hymel Hunt
Semi Tadulala	WG	Richie Kennar
Shaun Nona	FE	Liam Tyson
Sam Obst	HB	Cody Walker
Ricky Thorby	PR	Felise Kaufusi
Jason Roos (c)	HK	Tom Butterfield
Ethan Lowe	PR	Matthew Zgrajewski
Blake Leary	SR	Dane Hogan
Tyrone McCarthy	SR	Troy Giess
Ben Spina	LK	Kenny Bromwich
Davin Crampton	Bench	Donald Malone
Ryan Ghietti	Bench	Steven Thorpe (c)
Sheldon Powe-Hobbs	Bench	Mitch Garbutt
Joel Riethmuller	Bench	Liam McDonald
Jason Demetriou	Coach	Craig Ingebrigtsen

The Northern Pride dominated the regular season, winning 16 games as they won their second consecutive minor premiership. They defeated Easts 8–7 in the major semi final to qualify for their third Grand Final. Easts, who finished third, defeated Wynnum Manly in the first week of the finals before their one-point loss to the Pride. A week later, they again faced Wynnum Manly, winning 30–12 to qualify for their second consecutive Grand Final and their fourth overall.

=== First half ===
The Northern Pride opened the scoring in the 15th minute when centre Kyle Feldt crossed after a set play to the right. They added another try five minutes later when Hezron Murgha sent Javid Bowen over with a short ball. They went into the half time break with an 18–0 lead after Davin Crampton scored next to the posts in the 35th minute.

=== Second half ===
The Pride started the second half as they ended the first, when Shaun Nona caught his own rebounded kick and found his captain Brett Anderson, who scored in the corner. The lead jumped to 30 in the 51st minute when Ryan Ghietti scored thanks to a Blake Leary line break. After 65 minutes, the Tigers finally got on the scoreboard after winger Jarrod McInally scored a consolation try. The Pride wrapped up the win with their sixth try of the game, after Bowen crossed out wide for his second in the 79th minute. Shaun Nona converted to bring the final score to 36–4, the biggest winning margin in a Queensland Cup Grand Final (as of 2019). Nona was awarded the Duncan Hall Medal for man of the match.

North Queensland Cowboys-contracted Pride players Kyle Feldt and Ethan Lowe would go onto to play in the Cowboys' 2015 NRL Grand Final win over the Brisbane Broncos, while Pride head coach Jason Demetriou joined the Cowboys as an assistant coach in 2015 and was on the coaching staff for the Grand Final win.

=== NRL State Championship ===
After winning the Grand Final, the Northern Pride qualified for the inaugural NRL State Championship on NRL Grand Final day. They defeated the Penrith Panthers 32–28.

Sunday, 5 October
3:50pm (AEDT)

Penrith Panthers 2014 NSW Cup Premiers	28 – 32	Northern Pride 2014 QLD Cup Premiers
Tries: Luke Capewell (17') 1 Eto Nabuli (24') 1 Waqa Blake (36') 1 Kierran Moseley (44') 1 Kieran Moss(51') 1 Goals: Wes Naiqama 4/5 (19', 26', 46', 53')	Half Time: 16–16	Tries: Javid Bowen (12', 31', 63') 3 Blake Leary (7') 1 Semi Tadulala (59') 1 Tyrone McCarthy (72') 1 Goals: Shaun Nona 2/5 (32', 40' pen); Javid Bowen 2/2 (65', 73')

ANZ Stadium, Sydney
Referee: Adam Cassidy

== Player statistics ==
=== Leading try scorers ===
Pos	Player	Team	Tries
1	Garry Lo	Papua New Guinea Hunters	24
2	Marmin Barba	Ipswich Jets	20
2	Jarrod McInally	Easts Tigers	20
2	Henare Wells	Burleigh Bears	20
5	Tom Merritt	Tweed Heads Seagulls	18

=== Leading point scorers ===
Pos	Player	Team	T	G	FG	Pts
1	Khan Ahwang	Burleigh Bears	12	74	1	197
2	Shaun Nona	Northern Pride	7	81	0	190
3	Matt Seamark	Wynnum Manly Seagulls	1	83	0	170
4	Liam Taylor	Mackay Cutters	13	51	0	154
5	Adrian Davis	Redcliffe Dolphins	3	66	0	144

== End-of-season awards ==
- Courier Mail Medal (Best and Fairest): Luke Page ( Souths Logan Magpies)
- Coach of the Year: Jon Buchanan ( Wynnum Manly Seagulls)
- Rookie of the Year: Garry Lo ( PNG Hunters)
- Representative Player of the Year: Blake Leary ( Queensland Residents, Northern Pride)
- XXXX People's Choice Award: Willie Minoga ( PNG Hunters)

== See also ==
- Queensland Cup
- Queensland Rugby League
