= List of people from Gqeberha =

This is a list of notable people from Gqeberha, in South Africa.

== Notable people ==
- TxC – musical duo
- John Kani, actor and stage playwright
- Nomhle Nkonyeni, veteran actress
- Karl Bauermeister - cricketer
- Johan Botha – cricketer
- Schalk Burger – rugby union player; 2004 IRB International Player of the Year
- Adrienne Camp – singer-songwriter
- Thinus Delport – rugby union player
- Sophia De Bruyn – politician
- Russell Domingo – cricket coach
- Andrew Edge - artist
- Kermit Erasmus - footballer
- Ami Faku - singer and songwriter
- Jesse February, chess master
- Athol Fugard – playwright, novelist
- Danie Gerber – rugby union player
- Heavy-K - DJ and Music Producer
- Colin Ingram - cricketer
- Danny Jordaan – 2010 FIFA world cup organising committee boss
- Len Killeen – rugby union player
- Daine Klate - football (soccer) player
- Siya Kolisi – rugby union Player
- Pamela Mabini – human rights activist
- Saki Macozoma - former political prisoner, businessman
- Mzi Mahola - poet and author living in Zwide township
- Zolani Mahola – actress and singer-songwriter with the band Freshlyground
- Carl Mork – rugby league player
- Hans Mork – rugby league player
- Shashi Naidoo – actress and TV anchor
- Zim Ngqawana – jazz musician
- Winston Ntshona – playwright and actor
- Ashton Nyte - musician
- Wayne Parnell – cricketer
- Alviro Petersen – cricketer
- Robin Peterson – cricketer
- Shawn Phillips – singer-songwriter
- Graeme Pollock – cricketer
- Peter Pollock – cricketer
- Shaun Pollock – cricketer
- Ashwell Prince – cricketer
- Moonchild Sanelly - singer, dancer
- Tanya Seymour - Olympic equestrian
- Patrick Soon-Shiong – billionaire entrepreneur and philanthropist; part-owner of the LA Lakers; graduate of PE's Chinese High School
- Reeva Steenkamp – model
- Mzwandile Stick – rugby union player; former captain of the National 7s Team; Backline coach for the South African Rugby Team.
- Elrio van Heerden - footballer
- Joe van Niekerk – rugby union player
- Danny Williams - best known for his rendition of Moon River theme song
- Nikki Williams – singer-songwriter*
- Ronwen Williams - footballer
