= 2014 New South Wales Cup =

Rugby league championship in 2014

- League: NSW Rugby League
- Duration: 8 March to 28 September
- Teams: 13
- Matches played: 321
- Premiers: Penrith Panthers
- Minor Premiers: Penrith Panthers
- Runners-up: Newcastle Knights
- Wooden spoon: North Sydney Bears
- Man of Steel: Bureta Faraimo (NSW Cup Player of the Year)
- Top point-scorer(s): Josh Mantellato 248 (19 tries, 86 goals)
- Top try-scorer: Sami Sauiluma 21

The 2014 New South Wales Cup season is the second tier rugby league competition held in New South Wales, after the National Rugby League. The 2014 season will kick off on Saturday, 8 March 2014.

== Clubs ==
In 2014, 13 clubs are fielding teams in the New South Wales Cup. The New Zealand Warriors have replaced the Auckland Vulcans and the Penrith Panthers have returned to the competition replacing the Windsor Wolves this season.

Colors	Club	Location	Stadium	Founded	Joined*	A-Grade Team
	Canterbury-Bankstown Bulldogs	Belmore, NSW, Australia	Belmore Sports Ground	1934	2008	Canterbury-Bankstown Bulldogs
	Cronulla-Sutherland Sharks	Cronulla, NSW, Australia	Remondis Stadium	1963	2008	Cronulla-Sutherland Sharks; Melbourne Storm
	Illawarra Cutters	Wollongong, NSW, Australia	WIN Stadium	2012	2012	St. George-Illawarra Dragons
	Manly-Warringah Sea Eagles	Manly, NSW, Australia	Brookvale Oval	1946	2008	Manly-Warringah Sea Eagles
	Mount Pritchard Mounties	Mount Pritchard, NSW, Australia	Mount Pritchard Oval	2012	2012	Canberra Raiders
	Newcastle Knights	Newcastle, NSW, Australia	Hunter Stadium	1988	2012	Newcastle Knights
	Newtown Jets	Newtown, NSW, Australia	Henson Park	1908	2008	Sydney Roosters
	New Zealand Warriors	Penrose, Auckland	Mount Smart Stadium	1995	2014	New Zealand Warriors
	North Sydney Bears	Sydney, NSW, Australia	North Sydney Oval	1908	2008	South Sydney Rabbitohs
	Wentworthville Magpies	Wentworthville, NSW, Australia	Ringrose Park	1963	2008	Parramatta Eels
	Wests Tigers	Campbelltown, NSW, Australia	Campbelltown Stadium; Leichhardt Oval	1999	2013	Wests Tigers
	Penrith Panthers	Penrith, NSW, Australia	Sportingbet Stadium	1966	2014	Penrith Panthers
	Wyong Roos	Kanwal, NSW, Australia	Morrie Breen Oval	1910	2013	Sydney Roosters

*: The season the team joined is in the NSW Cup, not any other competition before this.

== Ladder ==
2014 New South Wales Cup season – Round 20
	Team	Pld	W	D	L	B	PF	PA	PD	Pts
1	Penrith Panthers	21	16	0	4	1	588	395	+193	34
2	Illawarra Cutters	21	12	2	6	1	556	380	+176	28
3	Wests Tigers	21	12	0	7	2	533	422	+111	28
4	Wentworthville Magpies	21	12	0	7	2	588	538	+20	28
5	New Zealand Warriors	21	11	1	7	2	435	372	+63	27
6	Mount Pritchard Mounties	21	11	0	8	2	546	447	+99	26
7	Cronulla-Sutherland Sharks	21	11	0	9	1	549	461	+88	24
8	Newcastle Knights	21	10	0	9	2	507	466	+41	24
9	Newtown Jets	21	9	1	10	1	503	550	-47	20
10	Wyong Roos	21	8	0	11	2	344	448	-124	20
11	Canterbury-Bankstown Bulldogs	21	5	2	13	1	434	551	-117	14
12	Manly Sea Eagles	21	4	0	15	2	370	615	-245	12
13	North Sydney Bears	21	2	0	17	2	362	620	-258	8

== Season ==
=== Round 1 ===
Home	Away	Ground	Date	Time	Result
Penrith	Newcastle	Centrebet Stadium	Saturday 8 March	2:15 pm	14–24
Cantebury	Cronulla	Belmore Sports Ground	Saturday 8 March	3:00 pm	30–38
Illawarra	West Tigers	WIN Stadium	Saturday 8 March	3:00 pm	14–34
Manly	Mounties	Brookvale Oval	Saturday 8 March	4:45 pm	10–50
Wyong	North Sydney	Morry Breen Oval	Sunday 9 March	3:00 pm	6–34
Wentworthville	NZ Warriors	Belmore Sports Ground	Saturday 8 March	1:00 pm	38–24

BYE: Newtown

=== Round 2 ===
Home	Away	Ground	Date	Time	Result
NZ Warriors	Illawarra	Eden Park	Saturday 15 March	2:45 pm (NZ) 12:45 pm SYD	12–12
Wentworthville	Newtown	Ringrose Park	Sunday 16 March	3:00 pm	44–10
Wests Tigers	Cronulla	Leichhardt Oval	Saturday 15 March	3:00 pm	12–20
Canterbury	Manly	Belmore Sports Ground	Saturday 15 March	3:00 pm	32–10
Wyong	Penrith	Morry Breen Oval	Sunday 16 March	3:00 pm	30–26
Newcastle	Mounties	Hunter Stadium	Sunday 16 March	4:15 pm	10–46

BYE: North Sydney

=== Round 3 ===
Home	Away	Ground	Date	Time	Result
Penrith	Canterbury	Centrebet Stadium	Saturday 22 March	2:15 pm	22–12
Mounties	Newtown	Aubrey Keech Reserve	Saturday 22 March	3:00 pm	38–16
Cronulla	Illawarra	Remondis Stadium	Saturday 22 March	4:45 pm	22–34
Manly	Wentworthville	Brookvale Oval	Sunday 23 March	12:45 pm	28–30
Newcastle	North Sydney	Townson Oval	Sunday 23 March	3:00 pm	50–22
Wyong	Wests Tigers	Morry Breen Oval	Sunday 23 March	3:00 pm	18–28

BYE: NZ Warriors

=== Round 4 ===
Home	Away	Ground	Date	Time	Result
Illawarra	Newtown	WIN Stadium	Saturday 29 March	3:00 pm	24–14
NZ Warriors	Wests Tigers	Westpac Stadium	Saturday 29 March	3:00 pm	26–32
Mounties	North Sydney	Aubrey Keech Reserve	Saturday 29 March	3:00 pm	20–18
Wentworthville	Penrith	Ringrose Park	Saturday 30 March	3:15 pm	22–42
Canterbury	Wyong	Belmore Sports Ground	Saturday 30 March	3:00 pm	18–32
Newcastle	Cronulla	Hunter Stadium	Sunday 30 March	12:45 pm	23–16

=== Round 5 ===
Home	Away	Ground	Date	Time	Result
Cronulla	NZ Warriors	Remondis Stadium	Saturday 5 April	12:45 pm	6–44
Newtown	Canterbury	Henson Park	Saturday 5 April	3:00 pm	14–14
Penrith	Mounties	Centrebet Stadium	Saturday 5 April	3:15 pm	32–16
Illawarra	North Sydney	WIN Stadium	Sunday 6 April	3:00 pm	38–6
Wests Tigers	Manly	Leichhardt Oval	Sunday 6 April	11:00 am	27–26
Wentworthville	Wyong	Ringrose Park	Sunday 6 April	3:00 pm	24–22

=== Round 6 ===
Home	Away	Ground	Date	Time	Result
Mounties	Newcastle	GIO Stadium	Saturday 12 April	12:45 pm	50–30
Newtown	Wentworthville	Henson Park	Saturday 12 April	3:00 pm	30–22
North Sydney	Wyong	North Sydney Oval	Saturday 12 April	3:00 pm	12–22
Penrith	Wests Tigers	Centrebet Stadium	Saturday 12 April	3:00 pm	22–14
NZ Warriors	Canterbury	Eden Park	Sunday 13 April	11:45 am (NZ) 9:45 am SYD	18–14
Manly	Cronulla	Brookvale Oval	Sunday 13 April	12:45 pm	10–38

=== Round 7 ===
Home	Away	Ground	Date	Time	Result
Canterbury	Wests Tigers	Belmore Sports Ground	Saturday 19 April	3:00 pm	6–40
North Sydney	Manly	North Sydney Oval	Saturday 19 April	3:00 pm	14–42
Wentworthville	Mounties	Ringrose Park	Sunday 19 April	3:00 pm	54–24
Illawarra	NZ Warriors	WIN Jubilee Oval	Saturday 19 April	3:15 pm	28–35
Cronulla	Newtown	Remondis Stadium	Saturday 19 April	5:15 pm	46–10
Newcastle	Wyong	Newcastle Sports	Sunday 20 April	3:00 pm	54–6

BYE: Penrith

=== Round 8 ===
Home	Away	Ground	Date	Time	Result
Cronulla	Penrith	Remondis Stadium	Saturday 26 April	12:45 pm	26–20
Newtown	NZ Warriors	Henson Park	Saturday 26 April	3:00 pm	12–48
Illawarra	Manly	WIN Stadium	Saturday 26 April	3:00 pm	26–4
Canterbury	Newcastle	ANZ Stadium	Saturday 26 April	5:15 pm	12–44
Wyong	Mounties	Morry Breen Oval	Sunday 27 April	3:00 pm	20–16
North Sydney	Wentworthville	North Sydney Oval	Sunday 27 April	3:00 pm	16–20

BYE: West Tigers

=== Round 8b ===
Home	Away	Ground	Date	Time	Result
North Sydney	Canterbury	Centrebet Stadium	Saturday 3 May	3:15 pm	20–27
Newtown	Manly	Henson Park	Saturday 3 May	3:00 pm	16–18
Penrith	NZ Warriors	Centrebet Stadium	Saturday 3 May	1:00 pm	36–8
Mounties	Wests Tigers	Aubrey Keech Reserve	Saturday 3 May	3:00 pm	24–14
Wentworthville	Newcastle	Ringrose Park	Saturday 3 May	3:00 pm	50–32
Wyong	Illawarra	Morry Breen Oval	Sunday 4 May	3:00 pm	0–40

BYE: Cronulla

=== Round 9 ===
Home	Away	Ground	Date	Time	Result
NZ Warriors	Mounties	Eden Park	Saturday 10 May	2:45 pm (NZ) 12:45 pm SYD	22–42
Cronulla	Wentworthville	Remondis Stadium	Saturday 10 May	3:00 pm	28–30
Manly	Wests Tigers	Brookvale Oval	Saturday 10 May	3:00 pm	28–22
Newtown	North Sydney	Henson Park	Saturday 10 May	3:00 pm	44–22
Newcastle	Penrith	Cessnock Sports Ground	Saturday 10 May	3:00 pm	16–38
Illawarra	Canterbury	WIN Stadium	Sunday 11 May	3:00 pm	34–22

BYE:Wyong

=== Round 10 ===
Home	Away	Ground	Date	Time	Result
Wentworthville	Illawarra	Pirtek Stadium	Saturday 17 May	12:45 pm	36–30
Canterbury	Penrith	Belmore Sports Ground	Saturday 17 May	3:00 pm	28–35
Manly	NZ Warriors	Brookvale Oval	Saturday 17 May	3:00 pm	18–22
Wyong	Newtown	Morry Breen Oval	Sunday 18 May	3:00 pm	8–34
North Sydney	Newcastle	North Sydney Oval	Sunday 18 May	3:00 pm	18–12
Cronulla	Wests Tigers	Remondis Stadium	Saturday 17 May	3:15 pm	28–30

BYE: Mounties

=== Round 11 ===
Home	Away	Ground	Date	Time	Result
Wests Tigers	Newcastle	Campbelltown Stadium	Saturday 24 May	1:00 pm	26–22
Mounties	Canterbury	Aubrey Keech Reserve	Saturday 24 May	3:00 pm	38–36
Manly	Penrith	Brookvale Oval	Saturday 24 May	3:00 pm	8–42
North Sydney	NZ Warriors	North Sydney Oval	Saturday 24 May	3:00 pm	22–26
Newtown	Illawarra	Henson Park	Saturday 24 May	3:00 pm	42–22
Wyong	Cronulla	Morry Breen Oval	Sunday 25 May	3:00 pm	16–38

BYE: Wentworthville

=== Round 12 ===
Home	Away	Ground	Date	Time	Result
Newtown	Mounties	Allianz Stadium	Saturday 31 May	3:15 pm	36–18
Cronulla	North Sydney	Remondis Stadium	Saturday 31 May	3:00 pm	25–18
Illawarra	Penrith	WIN Stadium	Saturday 31 May	3:00 pm	18–19
NZ Warriors	Newcastle	Mt Smart Stadium	Sunday 1 June	11:45 pm (NZ) 9:45 am SYD	34–12
Manly	Wyong	Brookvale Oval	Saturday 31 May	3:00 pm	30–36
Wests Tigers	Wentworthville	Leichhardt Oval	Saturday 31 May	3:00 pm	52–16

BYE: Canterbury

=== Round 13 ===
Home	Away	Ground	Date	Time	Result
North Sydney	Newtown	North Sydney Oval	Saturday 7 June	3:00 pm	16–38
Illawarra	Cronulla	WIN Stadium	Saturday 7 June	1:00 pm	23–22
Penrith	Wyong	Centrebet Stadium	Saturday 7 June	3:00 pm	32–24
Canterbury	NZ Warriors	Belmore Sports Ground	Saturday 7 June	3:00 pm	28–0
Newcastle	Wests Tigers	Cessnock Sps Ground	Saturday 7 June	3:00 pm	12–34
Mounties	Wentworthville	Aubrey Keech Reserve	Saturday 7 June	3:00 pm	16–20

BYE: Manly

=== Round 14 ===
Home	Away	Ground	Date	Time	Result
Newtown	Newcastle	Henson Park	Saturday 14 June	3:00 pm	26–28
Manly	North Sydney	Brookvale Oval	Saturday 14 June	3:00 pm	54–22
NZ Warriors	Cronulla	Rugby Park, GISBORNE	Saturday 14 June	3:00 pm	16–12
Mounties	Wyong	Aubrey Keech Reserve	Saturday 14 June	3:00 pm	6–14
Canterbury	Wentworthville	Belmore Sports Ground	Saturday 14 June	3:00 pm	20–22
Penrith	Illawarra	Centrebet Stadium	Saturday 14 June	3:15 pm	28–22

BYE: West Tigers

=== Round 15 ===
Home	Away	Ground	Date	Time	Result
North Sydney	Penrith	North Sydney Oval	Saturday 21 June	3:00 pm	28–32
Wests Tigers	Newtown	Leichhardt Oval	Saturday 21 June	3:00 pm	32–16
Mounties	Illawarra	Aubrey Keech Reserve	Saturday 21 June	3:00 pm	18–25
NZ Warriors	Wyong	Mt Smart Stadium	Saturday 21 June	5:15 pm (NZ) 3:15 pm SYD	8–12
Cronulla	Manly	Remondis Stadium	Saturday 21 June	5:15 pm	48–18
Newcastle	Canterbury	Newcastle Sports	Sunday 22 June	3:00 pm	38–12

BYE: Wentworthville

=== Round 16 ===
Home	Away	Ground	Date	Time	Result
Cronulla	Canterbury	Remondis Stadium	Saturday 28 June	3:00 pm	24–37
Newtown	Wyong	Henson Park	Saturday 28 June	3:00 pm	40–26
Manly	Illawarra	Brookvale Oval	Saturday 28 June	3:00 pm	12–46
Wests Tigers	Mounties	Campbelltown Stadium	Saturday 28 June	3:15 pm	26–30
NZ Warriors	Penrith	Mt Smart Stadium	Sunday 29 June	11:45 am (NZ) 9:45 am SYD	14–20
Newcastle	Wentworthville	Newcastle Sports Ground	Sunday 29 June	3:00 pm	34–14

BYE: North Sydney

=== Round 17 ===
Home	Away	Ground	Date	Time	Result
Newtown	Cronulla	Henson Park	Saturday 5 July	3:00 pm	16–36
Canterbury	Mounties	Belmore Sports Ground	Saturday 5 July	3:00 pm	12–42
Wyong	Manly	Morry Breen Oval	Sunday 6 July	3:00 pm	36–0
Illawarra	Newcastle	WIN Jubilee Oval	Saturday 5 July	3:15 pm	26–0
Wests Tigers	Penrith	Leichhardt Oval	Sunday 6 July	11:00 am	20–40
Wentworthville	North Sydney	Ringrose Park	Sunday 6 July	3:00 pm	56–16

BYE: NZ Warriors vs BYE

=== Round 18 ===
Home	Away	Ground	Date	Time	Result
NZ Warriors	Wentworthville	Mt Smart Stadium	Saturday 12 July	5:15 pm (NZ) 3:15 pm SYD	30–6
Canterbury	Illawarra	Belmore Sports Ground	Saturday 12 July	3:00 pm	24–24
Penrith	Newtown	Centrebet Stadium	Saturday 12 July	3:00 pm	36–20
Cronulla	Mounties	Remondis Stadium	Saturday 12 July	3:00 pm	22–20
Norths Sydney	Wests Tigers	North Sydney Oval	Sunday 13 July	3:00 pm	24–42
Newcastle	Manly	Newcastle Sports	Sunday 13 July	3:00 pm	44–10

BYE: Wyong

=== Round 19 ===
Home	Away	Ground	Date	Time	Result
Newtown	Penrith	Allianz Stadium	Saturday 19 July	12:45 pm	31–30
Wests Tigers	Canterbury	Leichhardt Oval	Saturday 19 July	3:00 pm	18–28
Mounties	Manly	Aubrey Keech Reserve	Saturday 19 July	3:00 pm	32–30
North Sydney	Illawarra	North Sydney Oval	Sunday 20 July	3:00 pm	12–26
Wyong	NZ Warriors	Morry Breen Oval	Sunday 20 July	3:00 pm	4–6
Wentworthville	Cronulla	Ringrose Park	Sunday 20 July	3:00 pm	36–40

BYE: Newcastle

=== Round 20 ===
Home	Away	Ground	Date	Time	Result
Penrith	Cronulla	Centrebet Stadium	Saturday 26 July	12:40 pm	22–14
Wests Tigers	North Sydney	Leichhardt Oval	Saturday 26 July	3:00 pm	30–22
Illawarra	Wentworthville	WIN Stadium	Saturday 26 July	3:00 pm	44–18
Canterbury	Newtown	ANZ Stadium	Saturday 26 July	7:00 pm	22–38
NZ Warriors	Manly	Mt Smart Stadium	Sunday 27 July	11:40 am (NZ) 9:40 am SYD	32–18
Wyong	Newcastle	Morry Breen Oval	Sunday 27 July	3:00 pm	12–22

BYE: Mounties

=== Round 21 ===
Home	Away	Ground	Date	Time	Result
Mounties	NZ Warriors	Aubrey Keech Reserve	Saturday 2 August	3:00 pm	42–4
Canterbury	North Sydney	Belmore Oval	Saturday 2 August	3:00 pm	34–16
Newcastle	Illawarra	Newcastle Sports	Saturday 2 August	3:00 pm	38–16
Penrith	Manly	Centrebet Stadium	Saturday 2 August	3:00 pm	36–0
Newtown	Wests Tigers	Henson Park	Saturday 2 August	3:00 pm	30–14
Wyong	Wentworthville	Morry Breen Oval	Sunday 3 August	3:00 pm	30–22

BYE: Cronulla

=== Round 22 ===
Home	Away	Ground	Date	Time	Result
Wentworthville	Manly	Ringrose Park	Sunday 10 August	3:00 pm	60–22
Wests Tigers	NZ Warriors	Kirkham Park	Saturday 9 August	1:00 pm (NZ) 11:00 am SYD	28–22
Illawarra	Mounties	WIN Stadium	Saturday 9 August	3:00 pm	42–14
Penrith	North Sydney	Centrebet Stadium	Saturday 9 August	3:00 pm	68–12
Cronulla	Newcastle	Remondis Stadium	Saturday 9 August	3:00 pm	12–56
Wyong	Canterbury	Morry Breen Oval	Sunday 10 August	3:00 pm	40–18

BYE: Newtown

=== Round 23 ===
Home	Away	Ground	Date	Time	Result
North Sydney	Mounties	GIO Stadium	Saturday 16 August	12:40 pm	0–40
Manly	Newtown	Brookvale Oval	Saturday 16 August	3:15 pm	38–18
Cronulla	Wyong	Remondis Stadium	Saturday 16 August	3:00 pm	6–26
Wests Tigers	Illawarra	Leichhardt Oval	Saturday 16 August	3:15 pm	24–16
Newcastle	NZ Warriors	St Johns Oval	Sunday 17 August	3:00 pm	26–12
Wentworthville	Canterbury	Ringrose Park	Sunday 17 August	3:00 pm	22–19

BYE: Penrith

=== Round 24 ===
Home	Away	Ground	Date	Time	Result
Illawarra	Wyong	WIN Stadium	Saturday 23 August	3:00 pm	26–40
NZ Warriors	Newtown	Mt Smart Stadium	Saturday 23 August	1:00 pm (NZ) 11:00 am SYD	28–30
North Sydney	Cronulla	North Sydney Oval	Saturday 23 August	3:00 pm	10–32
Manly	Newcastle	Brookvale Oval	Saturday 23 August	3:00 pm	18–42
Mounties	Penrith	Aubrey Keech Reserve	Sunday 24 August	3:00 pm	12–18
Wentworthville	Wests Tigers	Ringrose Park	Sunday 24 August	3:00 pm	44–6

BYE: Cantebury

=== Round 25 ===
Home	Away	Ground	Date	Time	Result
NZ Warriors	North Sydney	Mt Smart Stadium	Saturday 30 August	1:00 pm (NZ) 11:00 am SYD	48–12
Manly	Canterbury	Brookvale Oval	Saturday 30 August	3:00 pm	30–24
Wests Tigers	Wyong	Leichhardt Oval	Saturday 30 August	3:00 pm	16–26
Penrith	Wentworthville	Centrebet Stadium	Saturday 30 August	3:00 pm	44–12
Mounties	Cronulla	Aubrey Keech Reserve	Saturday 30 August	3:00 pm	38–24
Newcastle	Newtown	Newcastle Sports	Sunday 31 August	3:00 pm	26–24

BYE: Illawarra

== Final Series Chart ==
Qualifying and elimination finals
1	Penrith Panthers	42
4	Illawarra Cutters	6
5	Mounties	28
8	NZ Warriors	36
6	Wests Tigers	6
7	Wyong Roos	28
2	Newcastle Knights	24
3	Wentworthville Magpies	12

Semi-finals
Illawarra Cutters	29
NZ Warriors	12
Wentworthville Magpies	29
Wyong Roos	16

Preliminary finals
Penrith Panthers	31
Wentworthville Magpies	12
Newcastle Knights	34
Illawarra Cutters	10

Grand final
Penrith Panthers	48
Newcastle Knights	12

=== Qualifying/Elimination Finals ===
Home	Away	Ground	Date	Time	Result
Penrith Panthers	Illawarra Cutters	Leichhardt Oval	Sunday 7 September	noon	42–6
Newcastle Knights	Wentworthville Magpies	Leichhardt Oval	Saturday 6 September	12:40 pm	24–12
Mounties	NZ Warriors	Leichhardt Oval	Sunday 7 September	2:00 pm	28–36
Wests Tigers	Wyong Roos	Leichhardt Oval	Sunday 7 September	4:00 pm	8–26

=== Semi-finals ===
Home	Away	Ground	Date	Time	Result
Illawarra Cutters	NZ Warriors	Leichhardt Oval	Sunday 14 September	4:00 pm	29–12
Wentworthville Magpies	Wyong Roos	Leichhardt Oval	Sunday 14 September	6:10 pm	29–16

=== Preliminary-Finals ===
Home	Away	Ground	Date	Time	Result
Penrith Panthers	Wentworthville Magpies	Leichhardt Oval	Sunday 21 September	1:10 pm	31–12
Newcastle Knights	Illawarra Cutters	Leichhardt Oval	Sunday 21 September	3:10 pm	34–10

=== Grand Final ===
Home	Away	Ground	Date	Time	Result
Penrith Panthers	Newcastle Knights	Allianz Stadium	Sunday, 28 September	3:10 pm	48–12

== 2014 NRL State Championship match ==
From 2014 New South Wales Cup Premiers will play against the Queensland Cup Premiers with the winner to be crowned the Inaugural NRL State Champions.

Sunday, 5 October
3:50pm (AEDT)

Penrith Panthers 2014 NSW Cup Premiers	28–32	Northern Pride 2014 QLD Cup Premiers
Tries: Luke Capewell (17') 1 Eto Nabuli (24') 1 Waqa Blake (36') 1 Kierran Moseley (44') 1 Kieran Moss(51') 1 Goals: Wes Naiqama 4/5 (19', 26', 46', 53')	Half Time: 16–16	Tries: Javid Bowen (12', 31', 63') 3 Blake Leary (7') 1 Semi Tadulala (59') 1 Tyrone McCarthy (72') 1 Goals: Shaun Nona 2/5 (32', 40' pen); Javid Bowen 2/2 (65', 73')

ANZ Stadium, Sydney
Referee: Adam Cassidy
