= 2015 NRL State Championship =

Rugby league match

Newcastle Knights	Ipswich Jets
12	26
	1	2	Total
NEW	6	6	12
IPS	20	6	26
- Date: 4 October 2015
- Stadium: ANZ Stadium
- Location: Sydney
- Referee: Matt Noyen

Broadcast partners
- Broadcasters: Nine Network
- Commentators: Mat Thompson Scott Sattler Phil Gould

The 2015 NRL State Championship was a rugby league match held between the winners of the 2015 New South Wales Cup and the 2015 Queensland Cup. It was the second edition of the State Championship, following the inaugural 2014 edition, and was played on 4 October 2015, as a curtain raiser to the 2015 NRL Grand Final. The Ipswich Jets won the match, defeating the Newcastle Knights 26-12.

== Background ==
For the 2015 NRL State Championship, The Newcastle Knights won the NSW Cup by defeating the Wyong Roos 20-10 in the Grand Final, and the Ipswich Jets won the QLD Cup by defeating the Townsville Blackhawks 32-20 in the Grand Final.

== Match details ==
Sunday, 4 October
3:40pm (AEDT)

Newcastle Knights

2015 NSW Cup Premiers

Tries:
G Ndaira (28')
J Feeney(42')
Goals:
G Ndaira 2/2
12–26
Report

Ipswich Jets

2015 QLD Cup Premiers

Tries:
M Parcell (1')
B McConnachie (10')
M Barba (37')
R Griffin(63')
Goals:
C Anderson 5/5

ANZ Stadium, Sydney
Referee: Matt Noyen

=== Teams ===
Newcastle Knights	Position	Ipswich Jets
1. Jake Mamo	Fullback	1. Carlin Anderson
2. Honeti Tuha	Wing	2. Marmin Barba
3. Kerrod Holland	Centre	3. Liam Capewell
4. Joseph Tapine	Centre	4. Nemani Valekapa
5. Ken Tofilau	Wing	5. Richard Pandia
6. Carlos Tuimavave	Five-eighth	6. Josh Cleeland
7. Jaelen Feeney	Halfback	7. Dane Phillips
8. Damian Sironen	Prop	16. Billy McConnachie
9. Danny Levi	Hooker	9. Matt Parcell
10. Sam Mataora	Prop	10. Rod Griffin
11. Lachlan Fitzgibbon	2nd Row	11. Sam Martin
12. Jacob Saifiti	2nd Row	12. Kurtis Lingwoodock
13. Clint Newton (c)	Lock	13. Keiron Lander (c)
14. George Ndaira	Interchange	8. Josh Seage
15. Marvin Filipo	Interchange	14. Landon Hayes
16. Michael Steele	Interchange	17. Chris Walker
27. Tama Koopu	Interchange	22. Huskie Teutau
Matt Lantry	Coach	Ben Walker & Shane Walker

== See also ==
- 2015 New South Wales Cup season
- 2015 Queensland Cup season
