= Frank O'Connor (rugby league) =

Australian RL coach and former Australia international rugby league footballer

Personal information
- Full name: Francis Arthur O'Connor
- Born: 25 November 1906; Sydney, New South Wales, Australia
- Died: 23 August 1964 (aged 57); Sydney, New South Wales, Australia

Playing information
Club
Years	Team	Pld	T	G	FG	P
1927–37	South Sydney	72	14	0	0	42
Representative
Years	Team	Pld	T	G	FG	P
1932–33	Australia	4	1	0	0	3
1930–34	New South Wales	15	1	0	0	3
1931–34	NSW City	3	1	0	0	3
1930–32	Metropolis	2	1	0	0	3

Coaching information
Club
Years	Team	Gms	W	D	L	W%
1955–56	Eastern Suburbs	36	13	2	21	36
- Source: As of 3 April 2021
- Relatives: Alf O'Connor (brother)

Francis Arthur O'Connor (1906-1964) was an Australian rugby league footballer who played in the 1920s and 1930s and represented his state and country. He was a triple premiership winner with South Sydney.

== Playing career ==
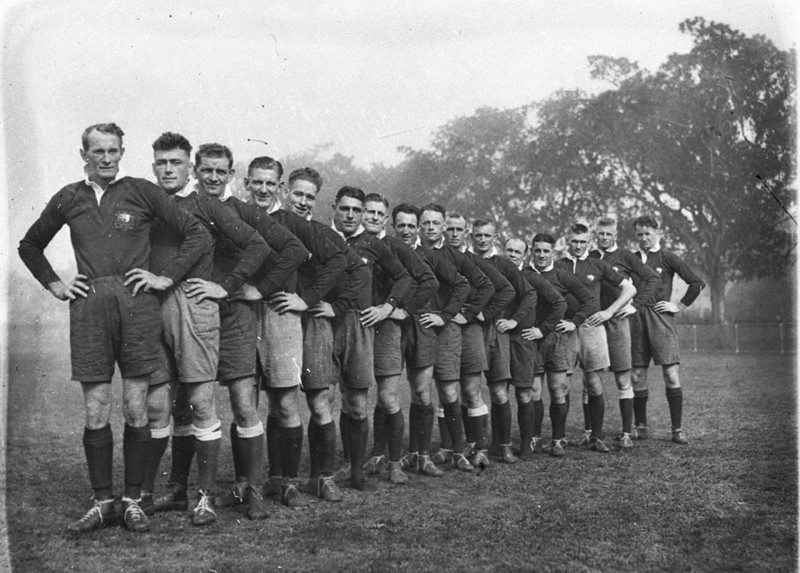
O'Connor last in line, Kangaroos squad June 1932

=== South Sydney ===
O'Connor was a champion forward who played for South Sydney for ten seasons between 1927 and 1937. O'Connor was a member of the champion Souths teams of the late 1920s and 1930s. He partnered his older brother Alf O'Connor in the winning 1929 Grand Final team, and played in two more winning grand finals - the 1931 Grand Final and the 1932 Grand Final.

=== Representative ===
O'Connor was also a representative player for New South Wales, playing fifteen times for the Blues between 1930 and 1934. He also represented Australia, making his Test debut in the 2nd Test against England in Brisbane in 1932. O'Connor also toured with the 1933-34 Kangaroos, playing in the first two Tests against England. He is listed on the Australian Players Register as Kangaroo No. 173.

== Death ==
O'Connor died on 23 August 1964, aged 57.
