= Jack Chaseling =

Australian rugby league coach and administrator

Personal information
- Full name: Jack Chaseling
- Born: 1880; Newtown, New South Wales, Australia
- Died: 1942 (aged 61–62); Sydney, Australia

Playing information
- Position: Wing, Centre
Club
Years	Team	Pld	T	G	FG	P
	Newtown

Coaching information
Club
Years	Team	Gms	W	D	L	W%
1929	Newtown	16	10	0	6	63
- As of 11 April 2021

Jack Chaseling (1880–1942) was a pioneer Australian rugby league administrator.

== Administrative career ==
Born William John Chaseling at Newtown, New South Wales in 1880, he became a legendary figure in the creation and administration of the Newtown Jets from the club's inception. He became the honorary-secretary of Newtown in 1910, and retained that capacity for 32 years until his death in 1942. In his younger days, Jack Chaseling played as a wing three-quarter in the Newtown rugby and rugby league competitions, but it was as a Rugby League administrator that he was best known and remembered. He played a big part in the code of Rugby League through his ties with the Newtown, and he was a member of the NSWRFL management committee for many years as the delegate from the Newtown club. Jack Chaseling was also the manager of the 1935 Kangaroo tour of New Zealand.

== Death ==
Jack Chaseling became ill, suddenly on the Saturday evening of 16 May 1942, after returning home from watching a Newtown v's Canterbury-Bankstown match at Henson Park. He died at Sydney Hospital the following night. His death was very widely mourned amongst the Sydney rugby league community, especially at the Newtown Rugby League Football Club, his funeral and his cremation was held on 19 May 1942 at Rookwood Crematorium.

== Coaching career ==
As a part of his many and varied duties at the Newtown club over the years, he coached the first grade side on many occasions, which included the whole of the 1929 NSWRFL season. Jack Chaseling died at Sydney Hospital on 17 May 1942, aged 62.

== Accolades ==
The street entrance to Henson Park in Marrickville, New South Wales was named Jack Chaseling Drive in his honour.
