= Bundaberg Grizzlies =

The Bundaberg Grizzlies colors.

The Bundaberg Grizzlies is a rugby league team from Bundaberg, Queensland that had previously played in the Queensland Cup. Their home ground is Salter Oval, Bundaberg.

== History ==
The Grizzlies were founded in 1996 and played in the Queensland Cup for 2 seasons (1996 and 1998).
