= Carl Mork =

South African-born Australian rugby league footballer

Personal information
- Full name: Carl Frederick Mork
- Born: 1906 South Africa
- Died: 3 August 1986 (aged 79–80) Five Dock, New South Wales, Australia

Playing information
- Position: Centre
Club
Years	Team	Pld	T	G	FG	P
1928–29	Newtown	21	6	0	0	18

Carl Frederick Mork (1906–1986) was a South African-born Australian rugby league footballer who played in the 1920s.

== Playing career ==
Mork played for Newtown. He was one of four brothers that played for the club, and his older brother Hans Mork was captain of the club. Carl played two seasons between 1928 and 1929, which included the 1929 Grand Final.

Mork died on 3 August 1986, aged 79.
