= Alf O'Connor =

Australia international rugby league footballer and administrator

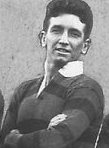

Personal information
- Full name: Alf William O'Connor
- Born: 5 July 1900 Sydney, New South Wales, Australia
- Died: 30 January 1970 (aged 69) Sydney, New South Wales, Australia

Playing information
- Position: Second-row
Club
Years	Team	Pld	T	G	FG	P
1922–29	South Sydney	83	14	0	0	42
Representative
Years	Team	Pld	T	G	FG	P
1922–30	New South Wales	17	5	0	0	15
1924	Australia	3	0	0	0	0
1922	Metropolis	1	1	0	0	0
- Relatives: Frank O'Connor (brother)

Alfred William 'Alf' O'Connor (1900-1970) was an Australian rugby league player who played in the 1920s and 1930s. O'Connor was a state and national representative second-rower who won three NSWRFL premierships with South Sydney.

== Playing career ==
Alf 'Itchy' O'Connor played eight seasons for South Sydney between 1922 and 1929. A tall second-row forward, O'Connor played 83 first grade games for Souths and played in four Grand Finals, and won three premierships with the club in 1925, 1926 and 1929.

O'Connor had an excellent representative career, representing New South Wales on nine separate occasions between 1924 and 1930. He also represented Australia on three occasions during the 1924 Ashes series.

O'Connor is listed on the Australian Players Register as Kangaroo No.131. Alf O'Connor was the brother of fellow Souths champion player Frank O'Connor.

== Post playing ==
Alf O'Connor became an Australian National Test Selector in 1946.

== Death ==
O'Connor died at Mascot, New South Wales on 30 January 1970 aged 69.
