= Jake Mamo =

Maltese/Australian professional rugby league footballer

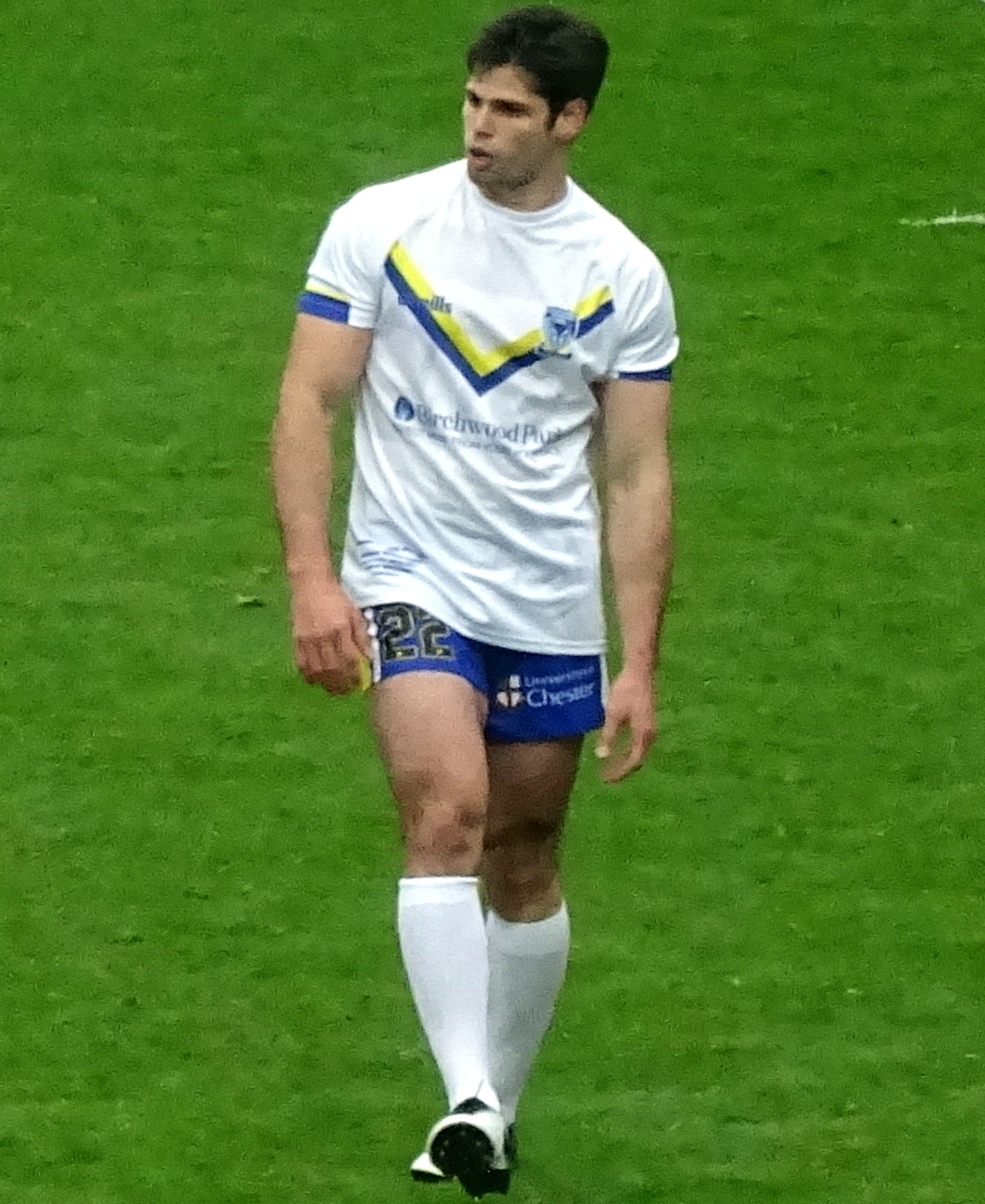

Personal information
- Full name: Jacob Mamo
- Born: 6 June 1994 (age 32) Gosford, New South Wales, Australia
- Height: 5 ft 10 in (1.78 m)
- Weight: 13 st 5 lb (85 kg)

Playing information
- Position: Centre, Fullback, Wing
Club
Years	Team	Pld	T	G	FG	P
2014–16	Newcastle Knights	29	11	0	0	44
2017–18	Huddersfield Giants	25	17	0	0	68
2019–21	Warrington Wolves	56	29	0	0	116
2020(DR)	→ Widnes Vikings	1	0	0	0	0
2022–23	Castleford Tigers	22	12	0	0	48
2024–	Midlands Hurricanes	0	0	0	0	0
	Total	133	69	0	0	276
- Source: As of 6 Aug 2024

Jake Mamo (born 6 June 1994) is an Australian professional rugby league footballer, who plays as a centre, winger or fullback for the Midlands Hurricanes in the RFL League 1.

He previously played for the Newcastle Knights in the NRL, and Huddersfield Giants, Warrington Wolves and Castleford Tigers in the Super League. Mamo has spent time on dual registration from Warrington at the Widnes Vikings in the Championship.

== Background ==
Mamo was born in Gosford, New South Wales, Australia, and is of Maltese descent.

He played his junior rugby league for the Ourimbah Wyoming Magpies, St Edwards Bears and The Entrance Tigers, before being signed by the Newcastle Knights.

== Playing career ==
=== Early career ===
At the end of 2012, Mamo won the Brian Carlson Club-Andrew Johns Medal as the Knights' best under-17 player. In 2013 and 2014, he played for the Newcastle Knights' NYC team. At the end of 2013, he won their NYC Players' Player of the Year award and re-signed with the Knights on a two-year contract.

=== 2014 ===
On 15 and 16 February, Mamo played for the Knights in the inaugural NRL Auckland Nines. After Newcastle's regular winger Akuila Uate suffered a knee injury, Mamo was selected to make his NRL debut in Round 7 of the 2014 NRL season against the Brisbane Broncos at Hunter Stadium, playing on the wing in Newcastle's 32-6 loss. On 3 May, he played for the New South Wales under-20s team against the Queensland under-20s team and scored three tries in the 30-8 win, the first hat-trick ever to be scored in an under-20s State of Origin match, as well as winning the Darren Lockyer medal for Man of the Match. In Round 14 against the Sydney Roosters, he scored his first NRL career in Newcastle's 29-12 loss at the Sydney Football Stadium. On 2 September, he was named at fullback in the 2014 NYC Team of the Year. He finished off his debut year in the NRL having played in 7 matches and scoring 2 tries. On 18 October, he played on the wing for the Junior Kangaroos against the Junior Kiwis at Mt Smart Stadium, scoring a try in the Kangaroos' 14–15 loss.

=== 2015 ===
Mamo played for the Knights in the 2015 NRL Auckland Nines. He finished the tournament as equal top try-scorer with 4 tries alongside Solomone Kata, Jack Bird, Justin O'Neill, Bryson Goodwin and Matt King. On 8 May, he re-signed with Newcastle on a two-year contract. He spent the first half of the season playing in Newcastle's New South Wales Cup team before earning a recall back to the first-grade team in Round 15 against the Cronulla-Sutherland Sharks. He scored a try in the match in which Newcastle later lost 30-28 at Hunter Stadium. On 27 September, he played at fullback in the Knights' 2015 New South Wales Cup Grand Final win over the Wyong Roos. On 4 October, he played at fullback in the Knights' 2015 NRL State Championship match against Queensland Cup premiers Ipswich Jets, where in the second half, he left the field concussed after being blindsided by a punch from Jets forward Billy McConnachie following a scuffle with Jets hooker Matt Parcell. The Knights went on to lose the match 26-12. Mamo finished off the 2015 season having played in nine matches and scoring four tries for Newcastle as the club finished last.

=== 2016 ===
In February, Mamo played for Newcastle in the 2016 NRL Auckland Nines. He finished the 2016 season having played in 13 matches and scoring five tries. The club would finish last again in 2016 with all of Mamo's 13 games ending in defeat. In December, he signed a two-year contract with Super League side Huddersfield Giants, after gaining a release from the final year of his Newcastle contract.

=== 2017 ===
In April 2017, Mamo made his debut for Huddersfield against Catalans Dragons. After scoring a try, he went on to win Man of the Match, despite the team losing 29-22.

=== 2018 ===
Mamo played 16 times for Huddersfield in 2018, scoring 5 tries. His last appearance for the Giants was in the 22-12 defeats at the home if Catalan Dragons in September 2018.

In November 2018, Warrington Wolves announced the signing of Mamo on a one-year deal. His initial one-year deal with the Warrington Wolves was announced at the club's 2019 kit launch in November 2018.

=== 2019 ===
Mamo made his first appearance for the Warrington Wolves in the Ryan Atkins testimonial game against the Widnes Vikings, scoring a hat-trick in the process

He played in the 2019 Challenge Cup Final victory over St. Helens at Wembley Stadium.

=== 2020 ===
Mamo played ten games for Warrington in the 2020 Super League season as the club qualified for the playoffs but were eliminated in the first week by Hull F.C.

=== 2021 ===
In round 8 of the 2021 Super League season, Mamo scored two tries for Warrington in a 62-18 victory over Salford.

In round 12, Mamo scored a hat-trick in Warrington's 40-14 victory over Wigan. On 1 July, Mamo signed a three-year deal to join the Castleford Tigers starting in 2022.

=== 2022 ===
Mamo was given squad number 4 for Castleford, and made his first appearance for the club on 11 February against the Salford Red Devils. He scored his first try for Castleford against Wigan on 17 March. On 30 May, it was announced Mamo would miss two of Castleford's matches after he was granted compassionate leave to return to Australia.

=== 2023 ===
On 15 March, Castleford Tigers announced that Mamo had left the squad with immediate effect, and this was later confirmed to be due to a back injury. On the same day, Mamo announced his retirement from rugby league.

=== 2024 ===
On 4 August it was reported he had come out of retirement to join Midlands Hurricanes in the RFL League 1 until the end of the season.
