= Tom Leamy =

Australian rugby league footballer

Personal information
- Full name: Thomas Leamy
- Born: 14 June 1898 Nymagee, New South Wales, Australia
- Died: 17 June 1969 (aged 71) West Ryde, New South Wales, Australia

Playing information
- Position: Hooker
Club
| Years | Team | Pld | T | G | FG | P |
|---|---|---|---|---|---|---|
| 1923–30 | Newtown | 70 | 3 | 0 | 0 | 9 |
Representative
| Years | Team | Pld | T | G | FG | P |
| 1924–25 | New South Wales | 5 | 0 | 0 | 0 | 0 |
| 1925–26 | Metropolis | 3 | 0 | 0 | 0 | 0 |

Thomas Leamy (1898–1969) was an Australian rugby league footballer who played in the 1920s and 1930s.

== Playing career ==
A Newtown junior, Tom Leamy was a hooker for the Newtown club during the 1920s. He played seven seasons for Newtown between 1923 and 1930.

Leamy had one grand final appearance for the club, playing hooker in the 1929 Grand Final against South Sydney, and also represented New South Wales on five occasions in 1924 and 1925.

Tom Leamy died on 17 June 1969, aged 71.
