= 2026 NRL State Championship =

Penrith Panthers	Redcliffe Dolphins
14	68
	1	2	Total
PEN	4	10	14
RED	40	28	68
- Date: 4 October 2026
- Stadium: Accor Stadium
- Location: Sydney
- Player of the Match: Jake Averillo
- Referee: Kieren Irons

Broadcast partners

The 2026 National Rugby League State Championship was a rugby league match contested by 2026 NSW Cup premiers Penrith Panthers and 2026 Queensland Cup premiers the Redcliffe Dolphins.

The NRL State Championship match was played at Accor Stadium, Sydney, as a curtain raiser match for the 2026 NRLW Grand Final and the 2026 NRL Grand Final on 4 October 2026.

Redcliffe's 68–14 victory was the most lopsided in the history of the NRL State Championship, as well as the highest score ever recorded in that competition.

Redcliffe five-eighth Jake Averillo won the player of the match award following his hat-trick of tries in the match, his final match with the club before his move to the Wests Tigers.

The result was the first victory for Redcliffe following their loss against the Canterbury-Bankstown Bulldogs in the 2018 match.

== Match details ==
2026 NRL State Championship

Sunday, 4 October
13:20 AEDT (UTC+11)

Penrith Panthers	14 – 68	Redcliffe Dolphins
Tries: 3 Edgar 15'; Clarke 54'; Liddiard 64'; Goals: 1 Clarke 55' (1/3)	1st: 4–40; 2nd: 10–28; Match Centre	Tries: 12; Averillo 4', 37', 44'; Gyemore 12', 74'; Coghill 20', 58'; Naufahu 25'; Pouniu 30'; Eilliot 34'; Fuller 47'; Saldanha 67'; Goals: 10; James 6', 13', 27', 31', 35', 38', 46', 48', 60', 70' (10/12)

Accor Stadium, Sydney
Referee: Kieren Irons
Video referee: Ashley Klein
Touch judges: Jack Klein, Nathan Cornick
Player of the Match: Jake Averillo (Redcliffe)

Team details
Penrith Panthers		Position	Redcliffe Dolphins
Name	Number	Position	Number	Name
Jaxen Edgar	1	Fullback	1	Trai Fuller
Nick Murphy	2	Wing	2	Steven Numambo
Patrick Moimoi	3	Centre	3	Jude Saldanha
Jesse McLean	4	Centre	4	Kyle Coghill
Jirah Liddiard	5	Wing	5	Tevita Naufahu
Keahn Skipps	6	Five eighth	6	Jake Averillo
Kurt Falls	7	Half back	7	Joshua James
Tom Ale	8	Prop forward	8	Sebastian Su'a
Billy Scott	9	Hooker	9	Brent Woolf
Jakeb Vailalo	15	Prop forward	10	Felise Kaufusi
Zakauri Clarke	11	Second row	11	Brian Pouniu
Kalani Leuluai-Going (c)	12	Second row	12	Sam Elliott
Luron Patea	13	Lock forward	13	Bradley Schneider
Josh Ruxton	10	Interchange	14	Jordan Plath
Vea Tapa'atoutai	14	Interchange	15	Sheldon Pitama (c)
Buster Hindmarsh	17	Interchange	16	Domenico De Stadis
Tuaomaliemavaitoelau Patea	22	Interchange	17	Jaron Purcell
Delahia Wigmore (not used)	16	Reserve	18	Jack Johnson (not used)
Matt Eisenhuth		Coach		Dave Elliott
NRL.com
