= Jack Jones (Australian rugby league) =

Australian rugby league player

Personal information
- Full name: Jack Jones

Playing information
- Position: Five-eighth, Halfback, Lock
Club
Years	Team	Pld	T	G	FG	P
1925–33	South Sydney	44	4	32	0	76

Jack Jones also known as Jackie Jones was an Australian rugby league footballer who played in the 1920s and 1930s. He played for South Sydney in the NSWRL competition during the club's first golden era where they won 7 premierships in 8 seasons.

== Playing career ==
Jones made his first grade debut for South Sydney against Balmain in Round 1 1925 at the Sydney Cricket Ground. Jones played 6 times for Souths in 1925 as the club went undefeated throughout the season and won the premiership without needing to play in a grand final.

Jones missed out on playing in the club's 1926, 1927 and 1928 premiership victories but returned to feature more prominently in 1929. Jones played at five-eighth in the 1929 NSWRL grand final against Newtown which was played at the Sydney Sports Ground. South Sydney convincingly won the match 30-10 claiming their 5th premiership in a row.

Souths would again win premierships in 1931 and 1932 but Jones missed out on playing in those grand final victories. Jones retired at the end of the 1933 season. In total, Jones played 51 times for Souths across all grades.
