= Tyrone McCarthy =

Ireland international rugby league footballer

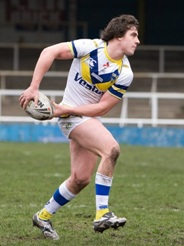

Personal information
- Full name: Tyrone McCarthy
- Born: 21 April 1988 (age 38) Warrington, Cheshire, England
- Height: 6 ft 0 in (1.83 m)
- Weight: 14 st 9 lb (93 kg)

Playing information
- Position: Second-row, Loose forward
Club
Years	Team	Pld	T	G	FG	P
2009–13	Warrington Wolves	43	3	0	0	12
2010(loan)	→ Leigh Centurions	18	6	0	0	24
2011(loan)	→ Wakefield Trinity Wildcats	7	1	0	0	4
2013(loan)	→ Swinton Lions	11	0	0	0	0
2014	Northern Pride	27	10	0	0	40
2015	Hull Kingston Rovers	31	6	0	0	24
2016–17	St. George Illawarra	2	0	0	0	0
2016(loan)	→ Illawarra Cutters	20	4	0	0	16
2017(loan)	→ Illawarra	17	2	0	0	8
2017–20	Salford Red Devils	72	10	2	0	44
2021	Leigh Centurions	12	0	0	0	0
	Total	260	42	2	0	172
Representative
Years	Team	Pld	T	G	FG	P
2009–19	Ireland	19	4	0	0	16

Coaching information
Club
Years	Team	Gms	W	D	L	W%
2026–	Western Suburbs Magpies	0	0	0	0
- Source: As of 16 October 2025

Tyrone McCarthy (born 21 April 1988) is a professional rugby league coach who is the head coach of the Western Suburbs Magpiesin the New South Wales Cup. He is a former Ireland international rugby league footballer who played as a second-row or loose forward for the Leigh Centurions in the Super League.

He previously played for the Warrington Wolves in the Super League, and on loan from Warrington at Leigh and the Swinton Lions in the Championship, and the Wakefield Trinity Wildcats in the Super League. McCarthy played for the Northern Pride in the Queensland Cup, before returning to the top flight in Europe with Hull Kingston Rovers. He played for the St. George Illawarra Dragons in the NRL, spending time with their feeder club Illawarra in the Intrust Super Premiership NSW. He then spent four seasons at the Salford Red Devils in the European Super League.

== Background ==
McCarthy was born in Warrington, Cheshire, England, with his family hailing from Clonality, County Cork, Ireland.

== Club career ==
=== Warrington Wolves ===
McCarthy made his début in the Super League for Warrington on 14 August 2009 against Wigan. He played as a substitute in the 2009 Challenge Cup Final in only his third first-team appearance.

McCarthy spent time on loan in the Championship with Leigh in 2010 and at fellow Super League club the Wakefield Trinity Wildcats in 2011, making 7 appearances before returning to his parent club.

He scored a try in the 2012 Challenge Cup Final victory over Leeds at Wembley Stadium.

=== Northern Pride ===
In 2014 he signed for the Queensland Cup side Northern Pride, playing a key role as the Pride won the 2014 Intrust Super Cup, and the inaugural NRL State Championship.

=== Hull KR ===
McCarthy returned to the Super League in 2015, signing with Hull Kingston Rovers. Following a season-ending injury to captain Terry Campese, McCarthy was named as the acting captain for the remainder of the year and led the team out at Wembley Stadium for the 2015 Challenge Cup Final, which Hull Kingston Rovers lost 50–0 to Leeds.

=== St. George Illawarra ===
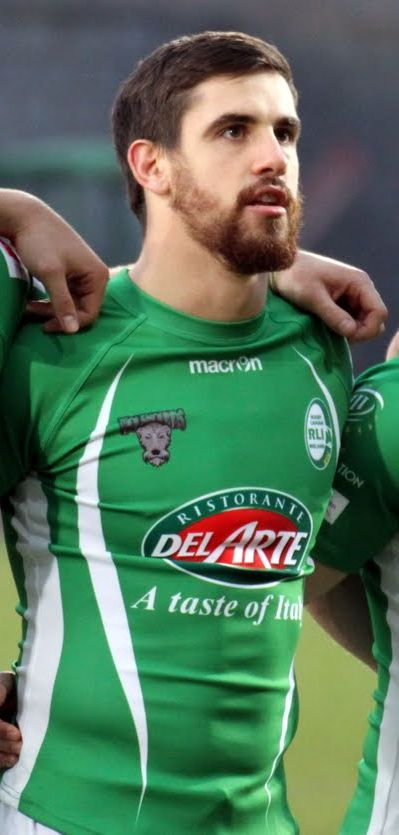
Tryone McCarthy lining up for Ireland

On 7 September 2015 it was announced that Tyrone McCarthy signed for the St. George Illawarra Dragons on a two-year deal beginning in 2016.

In September 2016, McCarthy was named as a second-row in the 2016 Intrust Super Premiership NSW Team of the Year.

=== Salford Red Devils ===
He played in the 2019 Super League Grand Final defeat by St Helens at Old Trafford.

He played in the 2020 Challenge Cup Final defeat for Salford against Leeds at Wembley Stadium.

=== Leigh Centurions ===
On 6 February 2021, it was reported that he had signed for Leigh in the Super League.

== International career ==
McCarthy is an Ireland international, having made his début in a victory over Serbia in 2009. He was named Ireland vice-captain in the build-up to the 2013 Rugby League World Cup.

== Coaching career ==
On 16 October 2025 he was announced as the new head-coach of Australian NSW Cup side Western Suburbs Magpies
