= George Casey (rugby league) =

Australian rugby league footballer

Personal information
- Full name: George Casey

Playing information
- Position: Wing, Centre
Club
Years	Team	Pld	T	G	FG	P
1929	Newtown	10	6	5	0	28

George Casey was an Australian rugby league footballer who played in the 1920s. He played for Newtown in the New South Wales Rugby League (NSWRL) competition.

== Playing career ==
Casey made his first grade debut for Newtown against Balmain in round 8 of the 1929 season scoring two tries in a 23–11 victory. Newtown would go on to upset St George 8–7 at Earl Park, Arncliffe in the semi-final to reach the 1929 NSWRL grand final.

In the grand final, Newtown's opponents were the all conquering South Sydney side who were looking to win their 5th premiership in a row. Casey played on the wing in the final as Newtown never troubled Souths losing 30–10 at the Sydney Sports Ground in front of 16,360 fans. Casey scored a try and kicked two goals in the defeat. The grand final defeat was Casey's last game for the club.
