= Charlie Pendergast =

Australian rugby league footballer

Personal information
- Full name: Charles Pendergast
- Born: 8 November 1899; Sydney, New South Wales, Australia
- Died: 8 December 1972 (aged 73); Ramsgate, New South Wales, Australia

Playing information
- Position: Prop, Lock
Club
| Years | Team | Pld | T | G | FG | P |
|---|---|---|---|---|---|---|
| 1925–29 | Newtown | 62 | 3 | 0 | 0 | 9 |

Charlie Pendergast (1899-1972) was an Australian rugby league footballer who played in the 1920s. He played for Newtown in the New South Wales Rugby League (NSWRL) competition.

== Playing career ==
Pendergast made his first grade debut for Newtown against North Sydney in Round 1 1925 at the Sydney Sports Ground.

Pendergast made 11 appearances for Newtown in his debut season as the club finished last on the table. Over the next few seasons, Pendergast became a regular in the Newtown side as the club finished mid table but did not reach the finals. In 1928, Newtown finished last on the table again and claimed the wooden spoon winning only 1 game all season. In 1929, Newtown had a complete form reversal and finished 4th on the table. The club then went on to upset St George 8–7 at Earl Park, Arncliffe in the semi-final to reach the 1929 NSWRL grand final.

In the grand final, the club's opponents were the all conquering South Sydney side who were looking to win their 5th premiership in a row. Pendergast played at lock in the final as Newtown never troubled Souths losing 30–10 at the Sydney Sports Ground in front of 16,360 fans. The grand final defeat was Pendergast's last game for the club.
