= Henson Park =

Sports field in New South Wales, Australia

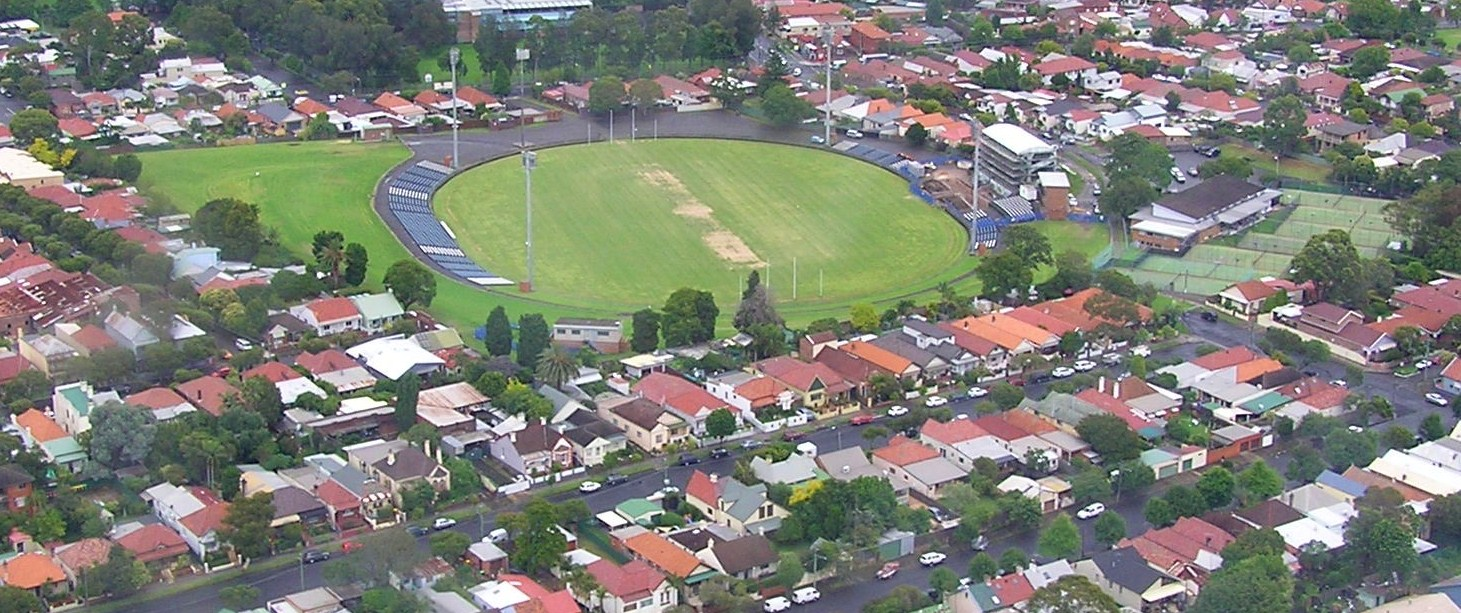
- Aerial view from the north east
- Interactive map of Henson Park
- Location: Marrickville, New South Wales
- Coordinates: 33°54′16″S 151°9′30″E
- Owner: Inner West Council
- Operator: Inner West Council
- Capacity: 20,000
- Surface: Grass

Construction
- Groundbreaking: 1933
- Opened: 1933

Tenants
- Newtown (NSWRL) (1937–1983); Eastern Suburbs (NSWRL) (1987, 1990); Newtown (NSWRL) (1990–present); Greater Western Sydney Giants (AFLW) (2022-present); Sydney Swans (AFLW) (2022–present)

Henson Park is a multi purpose sports ground in Marrickville, New South Wales, Australia.

== History ==
Henson Park was established in 1933 on the site of Daley's brick pit, Thomas Daley operated the Standsure Brick Company from 1886 to 1914. The brickworks occupied 9 acres (3.6 ha) and employed approximately 60 people. When the brickworks closed the pits filled with rain and ground water. The largest waterhole was known as "The Blue Hole" and was 40 to 80 feet in places (12.2 to 24.4 metres). Marrickville Council purchased the site in 1923 as it was a serious danger. Unfortunately, nine young boys drowned in the old water hole. In 1932 a grant was received to level the ground and work commenced as part of the Unemployment Relief Scheme.

The oval is set within a shallow hollow, formed by the upper edges of the former brickpit. This is the only one of the many parks formed on the sites of former brickpits which has retained evidence of its former use in its shape.

Henson Park was named after William Henson, who was Mayor of Marrickville in 1902, 1906 to 1908 and his son Alfred Henson, who was an Alderman of Marrickville Council from 1922 to 1931.

It was officially opened on 2 September 1933 with a cricket match between a representative Marrickville Eleven team and a North Sydney District team, which included Donald Bradman. The Mayor of Marrickville, Alderman Rushton, bowled the first ball, and North Sydney won the match.

Cricket may have been the first sport played on Henson Park, but the park is better known as a rugby league field. It is the home ground of Newtown Jets Rugby League Club, which is one of the founding rugby league clubs. Newtown still has a team in the New South Wales Cup. The first premiership game of Rugby League was played on 1 April 1936, when Newtown defeated University 20-0. In 1959, Henson Park had its record crowd for a rugby league match when 30,500 attended to watch St. George defeat Western Suburbs 47-17. The record crowd for a game featuring Newtown at the venue was two years earlier in 1957, when 21,588 watched St. George defeat Newtown 10-7.

On 1 October 1961 it hosted the Grand Final of the NSW soccer championship between the Hakoah Club and Canterbury-Marrrickville (4-1). The attendance of 18,400 represented a new Australian record for club matches in this sport.

Apart from football, the ground has had a long association with cycling. It was the principal cycling venue for the 1938 British Empire Games, as well as the venue for the games' closing ceremony. The Sydney Morning Herald (14/2/1938) reported the awesome scene of athletes and officials from all the competing nations standing in ordered lines under their country's banner on Henson Park. During the games, crowds regularly exceeded 40 000.

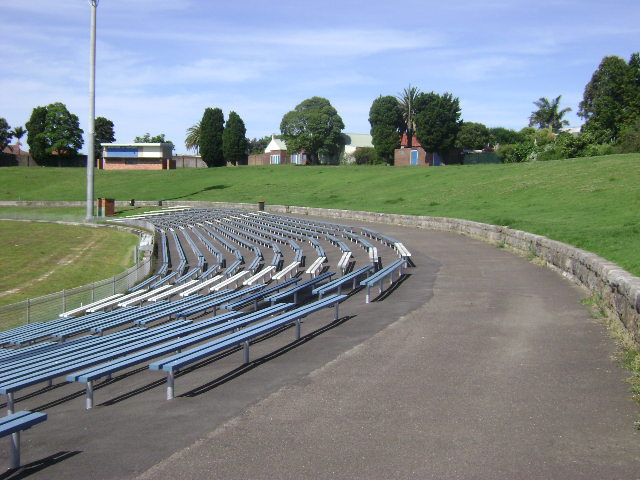
Hill on the eastern side

The velodrome surrounding the playing field was removed during the late 1970s and replaced by a grass running track used for local school athletics carnivals.

In round 5 (28 March) of the 1982 NSWRFL season, Newtown drew nil all with the Canterbury-Bankstown Bulldogs. It is the only nil all draw in competition history.

The last time Henson Park hosted a first grade rugby league match was on Sunday 26 August 1990. Eastern Suburbs hosted the Cronulla-Sutherland Sharks in the final game of the season, and won the game 16-11. In 2026, Henson Park hosted its first top grade game in 36 years when Parramatta and Cronulla played a pre-season trial at the venue which was televised. Parramatta would win the match 40-6.

In 2011/12, a $920,000 Henson Park upgrade was funded by the Australian Government Community Infrastructure Grants program. And was announced prior to the 2010 Australian federal election to upgrade facilities in the Park.

- Installation of electronic scoreboard.
- Replacement of asbestos roofing on grandstand and waterproofing and repainting of grandstand.
- Resurfacing of forecourt of grandstand to provide ramp access.
- Refurbishment of public toilets and the canteen.

Further upgrades were completed in 2022 (see Australian rules football section).

== Sites ==
=== Charlie Meader Memorial Gates ===
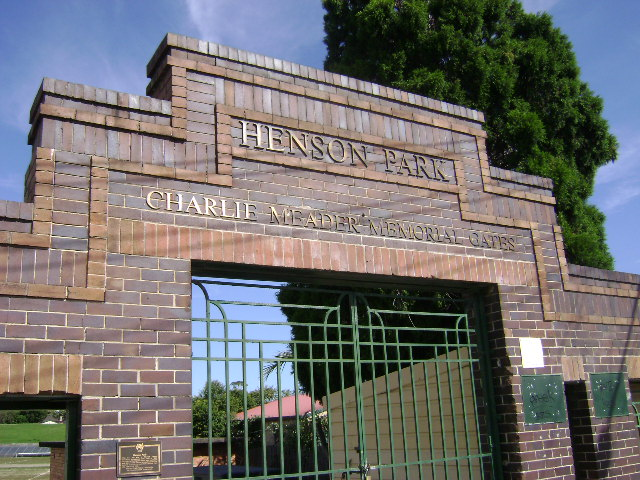
Henson Park, Charlie Meader Memorial Gates.

The Henson Park gates on the Centennial Street entrance were named as the "Charlie Meader Memorial Gates" in 2001 as a dedication to the memory and the recognition of Mr Meader's work as caretaker/groundskeeper of Henson Park for many years. Mr Meader joined Marrickville Council at the age of 16, and continued working there for another 53 years and was the longest serving council employee. Mr Meader was also the son of a former employee of the brick pit.

=== Jack Chaseling Drive ===
Jack Chaseling was one of the greatest of all Newtown Rugby League officials. He worked tirelessly for 32 years for the club. He was a delegate for the New South Wales Rugby League (NSWRL) and also served on many sub-committees with NSWRL. He was manager for the 1935 Australian Kangaroos tour of New Zealand. Marrickville Council acknowledged his work by naming the Sydenham Road entrance "Jack Chaseling Drive".

== Facilities ==
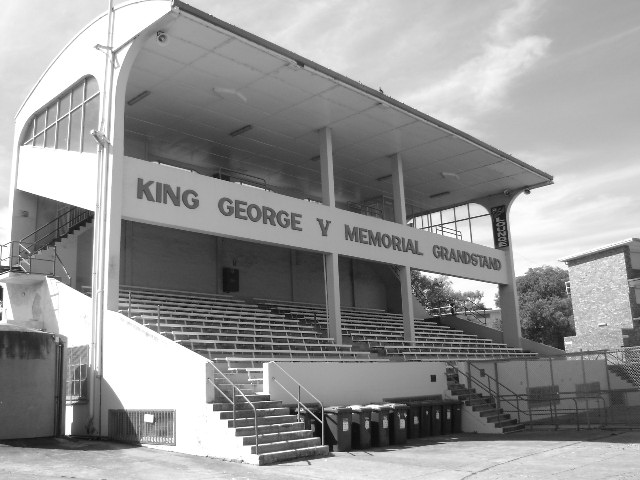
King George v Memorial Grandstand

Henson Park has changed little since it was first opened.

- On the western side is the King George V Memorial Grandstand, which accommodates about 1000 people. During the 1980s, when the high-profile adman John Singleton was club's chief benefactor, attempts were made to take the traditionally working-class Bluebags up-market. The upper section, named the Jet Set Lounge, at one stage was enclosed with glass and waiters served members and their guests food and drinks.
- From the north west to the south-east side of the ground runs a grass hill – one of the largest in Sydney.
- From the south east to the west, there is a bitumen bank where cars can park. About 200 cars can fit and it has always been popular to watch matches from your car seat.
- There is also a brick scoreboard with a kiosk in the north-east corner.
- Media/Corporate centre also with a kiosk to the northern side of the King George V Memorial Grandstand.
- Full Stadium lighting was installed in the late 1970s for the benefit of night games and for significant games to be televised.

== Newtown Jets ==
Since 1937, the ground has been primarily known as the home of the Newtown Rugby League Football Club nicknamed "The Bluebags", today known as the Newtown Jets. The Jets played in the New South Wales Rugby League premiership, a forerunner to the National Rugby League, until 1983 when they were dropped from the competition for financial reasons. However, the club was re-established as a senior club in 1990 and returned to play at the ground. The Jets compete in the NSW Cup and were the feeder team for National Rugby League side the Sydney Roosters until the end of the 2014 season after the Roosters announced they were ending a nine-year relationship with the club.

In 2015, Newtown signed a contract to become Cronulla-Sutherland's feeder side with the deal finishing at the end of the 2023 season.

In 2019, Henson Park hosted a Magic Round which consisted of 3 Canterbury Cup NSW games played at the ground on the same day in Round 10 of the 2019 season.

== Australian rules football ==
Henson Park has been used for Australian rules football matches for several decades, with the first matches of the sport occurring in the 1940s. AFL Sydney club the Newtown Breakaways have played some home matches at the venue since 2002, and the venue has hosted several other matches, including the AFL Sydney finals, 2008 AFL Under 18 Championships and the Community Cup. In 2022 Henson Park hosted its first ever AFL Women's (AFLW) matches, the highest-level women's Australian rules football league. Both Sydney AFLW clubs, the Sydney Swans and GWS Giants, play several of their home matches at the ground, which was upgraded in mid-2022 to refurbish the grandstand, install female-friendly amenities and additional changerooms, and construct a multi-purpose building for broadcast and match-day operations. The Sydney Swans women's team set an Australian rules football record for the venue of 7,171 in Round 6 of the 2025 AFL Women's season.

== Other sports ==
Henson Park is also used occasionally for competition matches in soccer. The Argentine rugby union side used Henson Park as a training venue during the 2003 Rugby World Cup.

== Rugby league record scores ==
- 80 points: Parramatta 62 Newtown 18 (20 Aug 1978)
- 64 points: St George 47 Wests 17 (24 May 1959)
- 63 points: Manly 57 Newtown 6 (16 May 1976)
- 60 points: Newtown 43 Easts 17 (7 Apr 1956)
- 58 points: Newtown 44 Parramatta 14 (12 Jul 1970)
- 58 points: Chile 58 El Salvador 20 (11 July 2016)
- 55 points: Balmain 43 Newtown 12 (7 Aug 1977)
- 54 points: Easts 48 Illawarra 6 (16 Apr 1989)
- 54 points: Newtown 45 Easts 9 (22 Aug 1954)
- 54 points: Newtown 44 Canterbury 10 (2 Jun 1945)
- 54 points: Parramatta 42 Easts 12 (1 Jul 1990)
- 51 points: Newtown 51 Illawarra 0 (2 May 1982)
- 51 points: Newtown 48 University 3 (12 May 1937)

== See also ==
- List of AFL Women's venues
- List of rugby league stadiums by capacity
