= Kierran Moseley =

Australian rugby league footballer

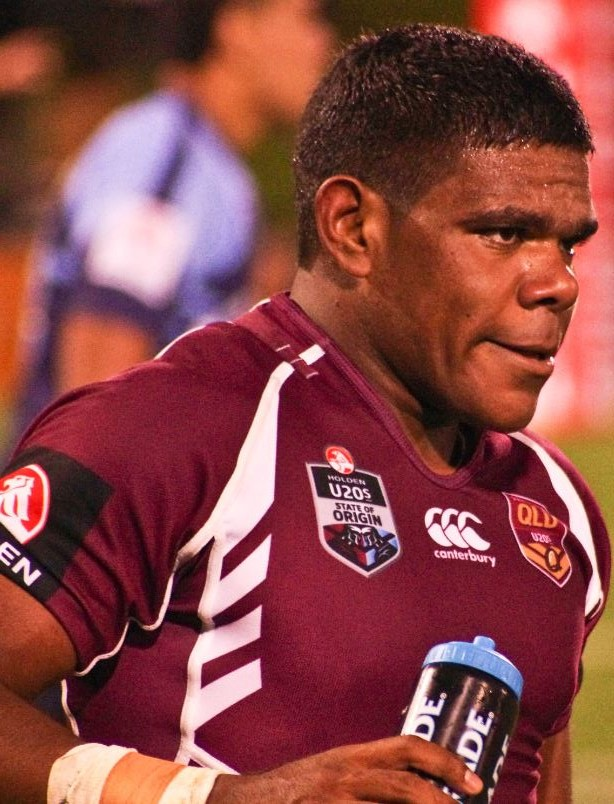
- Moseley playing for the Queensland Under-20s team in 2013.

Personal information
- Born: 14 May 1994 (age 32) Cloncurry, Queensland, Australia
- Height: 180 cm (5 ft 11 in)
- Weight: 87 kg (13 st 10 lb)

Playing information
- Position: Hooker
Club
Years	Team	Pld	T	G	FG	P
2014	Penrith Panthers	1	0	0	0	0
2015–16	Gold Coast Titans	20	1	0	0	4
	Total	21	1	0	0	4
Representative
Years	Team	Pld	T	G	FG	P
2015–24	Indigenous All Stars	3	0	0	0	0
- Source: As of 16 February 2024

Kierran Moseley (born 14 May 1994) is an Australian professional rugby league footballer who plays for the Norths Devils in the Queensland Cup competition. He previously played for the Gold Coast Titans and Penrith Panthers in the National Rugby League. He plays at hooker.

== Background ==
Born in Cloncurry, Queensland, Moseley is an Indigenous Australian and played his junior rugby league for the Cloncurry Bulls, before moving to Townsville to further his rugby league career. After being spotted by Penrith Panthers' NYC coach Garth Brennan, Moseley joined the Panthers.

== Playing career ==
=== Early career ===
In 2013 and 2014, Moseley played for the Penrith Panthers' NYC team. On 20 April 2013, he played for the Queensland Under-20s team. On 6 October 2013, he played in the Panthers' 2013 NYC Grand Final win over the New Zealand Warriors. On 13 October 2013, he played for the Junior Kangaroos against the Junior Kiwis. On 3 May 2014, he again played for the Queensland Under-20s team.

=== 2014 ===
In round 25 of the 2014 NRL season, Moseley made his NRL debut for the Penrith club against the Manly Warringah Sea Eagles. He then went onto win the 2014 New South Wales Cup playing for the Panthers reserves. On 17 November 2014, he signed a two-year contract with the Gold Coast Titans starting in 2015.

=== 2015 ===
On 13 February 2015, Moseley played for the Indigenous All Stars against the NRL All Stars in the annual All Stars match. In round 1 of the 2015 NRL season, he made his Titans debut against the Wests Tigers.

=== Later career ===
In 2016, Moseley signed for the Tweed Seagulls in the Queensland Cup. This was followed by playing spells with Townsville and Ipswich. In 2022, Moseley signed for Norths and was part of their Queensland Cup winning squad that season. He then captained the club to another premiership in 2024 and the 2024 NRL State Championship. The State Championship title was Moseley's first at the third attempt having played for Penrith in 2014, and Norths in 2022.
