= Eto Nabuli =

Fiji & Australia international rugby footballer

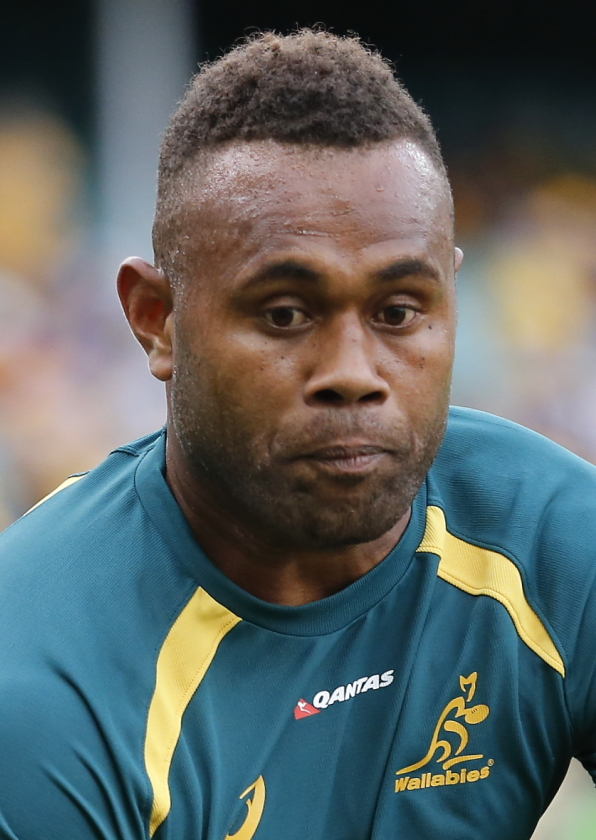
- Nabuli playing for the Wallabies in 2017

Personal information
- Full name: Etonia Nabuli
- Born: 24 August 1988 (age 38) Sigatoka, Viti Levu, Fiji
- Height: 197 cm (6 ft 5 1/2 in)
- Weight: 108 kg (17 st 0 lb; 238 lb)

Playing information
- Position: Wing
Club
Years	Team	Pld	T	G	FG	P
2015	St. George Illawarra	14	7	0		28
Representative
Years	Team	Pld	T	G	FG	P
2014–15	Fiji	2				0

Rugby union career
- Position: Wing
Senior career
Years	Team	Apps	(Points)
2016–	Queensland Country	10	(15)
2018–2019	Bordeaux Bègles	15	(5)
Super Rugby
Years	Team	Apps	(Points)
2016–2018	Reds	39	(50)
- Correct as of 18 March 2018
International career
Years	Team	Apps	(Points)
2017	Australia	1	(0)

Etonia Nabuli (born 24 August 1988) is a Fijian-born Australian professional rugby footballer who plays rugby league for the Wentworthville Magpies in the Ron Massey Cup. He previously played rugby league for the St. George Illawarra Dragons in the National Rugby League as a wing, also representing Fiji. He also played rugby union for the Reds.

== Background ==
Nabuli was born in Sigatoka, Fiji. In 2012, after coincidentally bumping into Andrew Johns and Brad Fittler while working as a porter at InterContinental in Fiji, Nabuli joined the Penrith Panthers for the 2013 NRL season. Johns and Fittler were in Fiji promoting rugby league, when the two first noticed Nabuli and decided to bring him to Australia to play rugby league. Nabuli says he had only played rugby union prior to coming to Australia in late December 2012.

== Rugby league ==
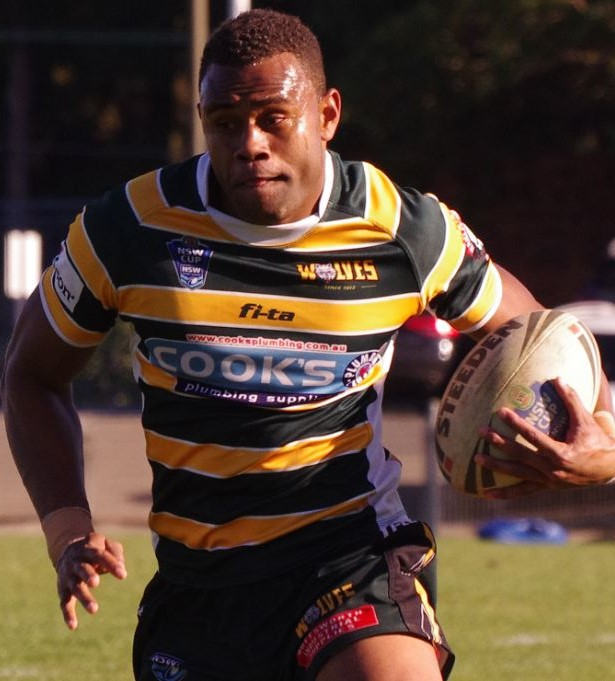
Nabuli playing for the Windsor Wolves in 2013

=== 2013 ===
Nabuli was a regular player for the Windsor Wolves in the New South Wales Cup during the 2013 season, finishing as the competition's leading try-scorer, with 30 tries. On 23 September 2013, he was named on the wing in the 2013 New South Wales Cup Team of the Year.

=== 2014 ===
In February 2014, he was included in the Penrith Panthers' 16-man squad that participated in the 2014 Auckland Nines competition. He sustained a medial collateral ligament injury on his left knee during the competition's quarter-final.

In May, Nabuli played for Fiji in the 2014 Pacific Test. On 28 September, he played in the Panthers' 2014 New South Wales Cup Grand Final victory over the Newcastle Knights.

=== 2015 ===
On 27 October, Nabuli signed a 1-year contract with the St. George Illawarra Dragons, starting in 2015, after rejecting interest from Super Rugby team, the Western Force. In round 1 of the 2015 NRL season, he made his NRL debut for the Dragons, against the Melbourne Storm, scoring a try on debut. On 2 May, he played for Fiji against Papua New Guinea in the 2015 Melanesian Cup. On 14 June, he re-signed with the Dragons on a 1-year contract. He finished off his debut season having played in 13 games and scoring 7 tries.

== Rugby union ==
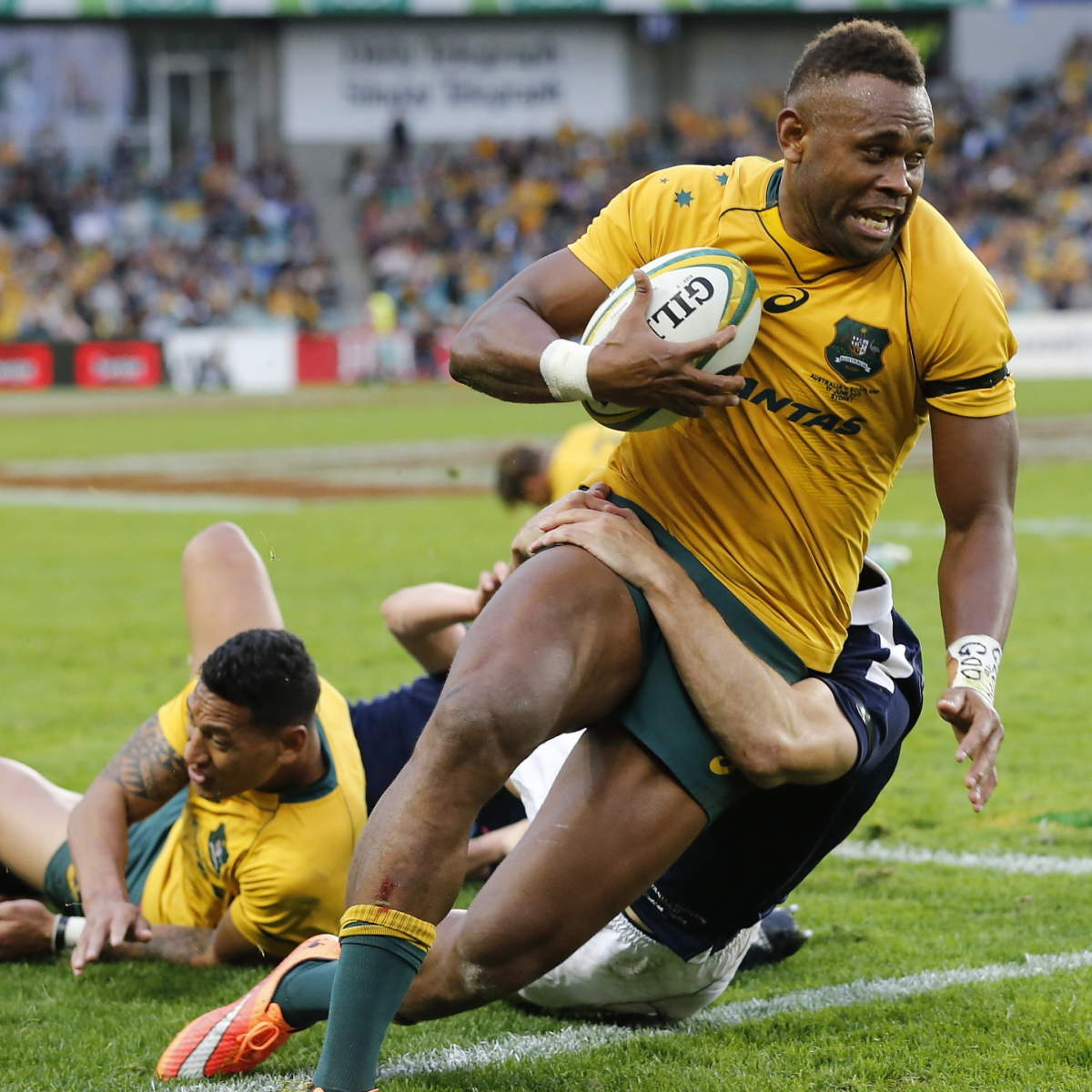
Nabuli with Australia against Scotland in 2017

=== 2016 ===
In September, it was confirmed that Nabuli would join Super Rugby side, Queensland Reds from 2016 on a two-year contract, after being released from the final year of his Dragons contract.

After the first 12 rounds of Super rugby, Wallabies coach, Michael Cheika, selected Nabuli in his preliminary 39-man squad for the test series against England in 2016. He did not play for the Wallabies that season, but was selected again the following year, making his test debut against Scotland on 17 June 2017.

=== 2017 ===
In 2017 the Queensland Reds finished 3rd in the Australian conference and 14th overall, winning just four out of fifteen games. Nabuli was associated with 26% of the total scored tries for the Reds during the 2017 season scoring a total of eight tries and four try assists.

In October 2017, Nabuli played for the Barbarians against Australia at Allianz Stadium, Sydney. Losing the game 31–28.

=== Bordeaux ===
In March 2018, it has been rumoured that Nabuli along with other fellow Reds players will be leaving the club to join Bordeaux in the French Top 14, as they are off contract at the conclusion of the season.
