= Hans Mork =

Australian rugby league footballer and coach

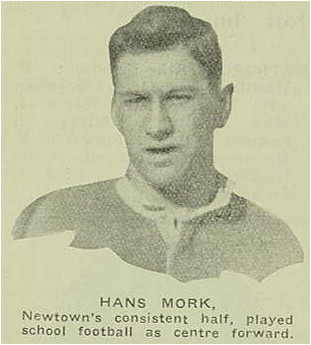
- Hans Mork

Personal information
- Full name: Hans Eric Mork
- Born: 1909 Cape Town, South Africa
- Died: 22 January 1960 (aged 50–51) Ashfield, New South Wales, Australia

Playing information
Club
Years	Team	Pld	T	G	FG	P
1929–31	Newtown	40	9	2	0	31
1932	Wests Newcastle
1933–34	Newtown	17	2	0	0	6
1934	Goulburn
1935–37	Newtown	16	5	5	0	25
	Total	73	16	7	0	62
Representative
Years	Team	Pld	T	G	FG	P
1935–36	New South Wales	3	2	0	0	6
1933	NSW City	1	0	0	0	0
1934	NSW Country	2	0	0	0	0

Hans Eric Mork (1909 – 22 January 1960) was a South African-born Australian rugby league footballer who played in the 1920s and 1930s. He played in Sydney for the Newtown club (with whom he won the 1933 NSWRFL Premiership), as well as in Newcastle for the Western Suburbs club and elsewhere in country New South Wales.

== Background ==
Mork was born in Cape Town, South Africa.

== Playing career ==
Mork was one of four brothers to play for Newtown. He was graded with the club in 1927 and made it to first grade two years later.

He played eight seasons with Newtown between 1929 and 1938 with a few country captain-coach seasons in between. He was captain-coach of the Newcastle Rugby League's Western Suburbs club in 1932. Mork represented N.S.W. Country Firsts in 1934 whilst playing for Goulburn but returned to Newtown the following season.

Mork won a premiership with Newtown in 1933 and became club captain in 1935. Mork also played in Newtown's 1929 grand final loss against South Sydney. Mork retired with immediate effect in April 1937.

== Death ==
Mork was killed in a car accident on 22 January 1960.
