= NRL State Championship =

Australian second-tier rugby league title

- Sport: Rugby league
- Instituted: 2014
- Countries: Australia; New Zealand; Papua New Guinea
- Winners: Redcliffe Dolphins (2026)
- Website: www.NRL.com
- Broadcast partner: Nine Network (Australia); Fox League (Australia); Sky Sport (New Zealand); ABC Grandstand (Australia)
- Related competition: New South Wales Cup; Queensland Cup; National Rugby League

The NRL State Championship is a rugby league match contested by the premiers of the two second-tier competitions in Australia, the New South Wales Cup and the Queensland Cup. The match has been played as a curtain-raiser to the NRL Grand Final at Stadium Australia since it was introduced by the National Rugby League (NRL) in 2014, and determines the National Reserve Grade Champions.

== History ==
The origins of the NRL State Championship can be traced back to an idea from the Queensland media during the 1984 Brisbane Rugby League season when two club sides had agreed to play a one-off match. This was when the competitions of the Sydney Rugby League premiership and the Brisbane Rugby League premiership operated independently of each other with the only exception being State of Origin time, when players crossed paths. While the New South Wales media's general consensus was always that Sydney-based NSWRL was the premier and stronger of the two major rugby league competition, all seemed to be set for the one-off match before the NSWRL hierarchy stepped in and put a stop to the proposed match.

In 1984 the Wynnum-Manly Seagulls were one of the strongest teams in the Brisbane Rugby League competition defeating the Southern Suburbs Districts Magpies in the grand final, who were coached by Wayne Bennett and featuring players such as Gary Belcher, Mal Meninga, Peter Jackson, Bob Lindner by a record 42–8 scoreline in the BRL grand final. Some Queensland supporters have argued they compare favourably with the 1984 Sydney Rugby League champion team the Canterbury-Bankstown Bulldogs. At the time, sections of Brisbane media suggested staging a challenge match between the Brisbane Premiers Wynnum-Manly and the Sydney Premiers Canterbury Bankstown.

It was an idea liked by the QRL, but if the suggestion is that the NSWRL were the roadblock, Canterbury prop Peter Tunks said the Bulldogs players and officials were just as keen to make the game happen as their northern rivals. "There was talk in the media about it and we were keen to play it because they obviously had a pretty good side with Wally, Gene Miles, Greg Dowling but we loved playing anybody back in those days", Tunks said. "We knew that it was a decent comp in Brisbane but we obviously didn't think it was as strong as the Sydney comp because this was the be-all and end-all. At Canterbury, we really loved a challenge and we would have loved the opportunity of going up against a team full of great players like they had. It's like anything, to be the best you have to beat the best and that was our attitude but unfortunately it didn't come off. I don't know where we were supposed to play but it would have been good fun."

The NRL State Championship is marketed as "The best New South Wales club versus the best Queensland club". However, in both the New South Wales and Queensland Cups there are or were clubs based outside their respective states:

- Canberra Raiders based in Canberra, Australian Capital Territory, Australia (New South Wales Cup)
- Melbourne Storm based in Melbourne, Victoria, Australia (New South Wales Cup)
- NZ Warriors based in Auckland, Auckland Region, New Zealand (New South Wales Cup)
- PNG Hunters based in Port Moresby, Central Province, Papua New Guinea (Queensland Cup)
- Tweed Heads Seagulls based in Tweed Heads, New South Wales, Australia (Queensland Cup)

In 2014 the Northern Pride representing the Queensland Cup defeated the Penrith Panthers representing the New South Wales Cup in the first NRL State Championship Grand Final. The match has been played every subsequent year, with the exception of 2020 when it was not held on account of both competitions being cancelled due to the effects of the COVID-19 pandemic, and in 2021 with the remainder of the New South Wales Cup being cancelled also due to the COVID-19 lockdown in Sydney.

== Results ==
The NRL State Championship match is a curtain-raiser to the final match on NRL Grand Final day, with the winner crowned the NRL State Champions. Between 2014 and 2017 the match was played after the now-defunct NRL Youth Grand Final and before the NRL Grand Final. In 2018 the match was played after the NRL Women's Grand Final and before the NRL Men's Grand Final. Since 2019 it has been played before the NRL Women's Grand Final and the NRL Men's Grand Final.
In 2020 the NRL State Championship match was not played due to the cancellation of the state premierships after Round 1 caused by the Coronavirus pandemic, and wasn't played in 2021 due the COVID-19 lockdown in Sydney.
The NRL State Championship match made its return in 2022.

== NRL State Championship winners ==
NRL Season	NRL State Championship				Player of the Match
NRL Season	Winners	Score	Runners-up	Venue	Player of the Match
2014	Northern Pride	32–28	Penrith Panthers	Stadium Australia	Javid Bowen
2015	Ipswich Jets	26–12	Newcastle Knights	Stadium Australia	Matt Parcell
2016	Illawarra Cutters	54–12	Burleigh Bears	Stadium Australia	Drew Hutchison
2017	Penrith Panthers	42–18	PNG Hunters	Stadium Australia	Kaide Ellis
2018	Canterbury-Bankstown Bulldogs	42–18	Redcliffe Dolphins	Stadium Australia	Josh Cleeland
2019	Newtown Jets	20–16	Burleigh Bears	Stadium Australia	Toby Rudolf
2020	Match was cancelled due to the COVID-19 pandemic lockdown in Australia.				
2021	Match was cancelled due to the COVID-19 pandemic lockdown in New South Wales.				
2022	Penrith Panthers	44–10	Norths Devils	Stadium Australia	J'maine Hopgood
2023	South Sydney Rabbitohs	42–22	Brisbane Tigers	Stadium Australia	Tyrone Munro
2024	Norths Devils	20–18	Newtown Jets	Stadium Australia	Oryn Keeley
2025	NZ Warriors	50–20	Burleigh Bears	Stadium Australia	Tanah Boyd
2026	Redcliffe Dolphins	68–14	Penrith Panthers	Stadium Australia	Jake Averillo

=== State Championship team performances ===
Rugby League Team	Played	Won	Lost	Years Played	Years won	Years lost
Penrith Panthers	4	2	2	2014, 2017, 2022, 2026	2017, 2022	2014, 2026
NZ Warriors	1	1	0	2025	2025	
South Sydney Rabbitohs	1	1	0	2023	2023	
Canterbury-Bankstown Bulldogs	1	1	0	2018	2018	
Illawarra Cutters	1	1	0	2016	2016	
Ipswich Jets	1	1	0	2015	2015	
Northern Pride	1	1	0	2014	2014	
Norths Devils	2	1	1	2022, 2024	2024	2022
Newtown Jets	2	1	1	2019, 2024	2019	2024
Newcastle Knights	1	0	1	2015		2015
PNG Hunters	1	0	1	2017		2017
Redcliffe Dolphins	2	1	1	2018, 2026	2026	2018
Brisbane Tigers	1	0	1	2023		2023
Burleigh Bears	3	0	3	2016, 2019, 2025		2016, 2019, 2025

== Media coverage ==
Live television coverage for the NRL State Championship is broadcast by Australia's Fox Sports and Nine (which includes Nine's regional affiliates NBN, WIN and IMP until 2015 and mid 2016) while live radio coverage is broadcast by Australia's ABC Grandstand around Australia via both the ABC Radio Mobile App (Digital Radio Stadion) and their network of FM and AM Local Radio Stations.

== See also ==
- New South Wales Cup
- Queensland Cup
