= List of Wests Tigers players =

This article lists all rugby league footballers who have played first-grade for the Wests Tigers. Players are listed according to the date of their debut game for the club. Players that debuted in the same game are normally capped in order of which position they played in the game, but order is at club discretion.

Statistics correct as of round 10 of the 2024 NRL season.

== List of players ==
Cap No.	Name	Nationality	Tigers Career	Debut Round	Previous club (Note: Previous club refers to any previous first-grade rugby league club and does not refer to any junior club or Rugby Union club. Debut refers to a player's debut in first-grade rugby league.)	Position	Appearances	Tries	Goals	Field goals	Points
1.	Joel Caine	(Australia)	2000–03	Rd. 1	Balmain Tigers	Fullback	75	26	211	0	526
2.	John Carlaw	(Australia)	2000–01	Rd. 1	Balmain Tigers	Centre, Wing	41	14	0	0	56
3.	Owen Craigie	(Australia)	2000–01	Rd. 1	Newcastle Knights	Centre	23	7	0	0	28
4.	Terry Hill	(Australia)	2000–03	Rd. 1	Manly-Warringah Sea Eagles	Centre	49	8	0	0	32
5.	John Hopoate	(Tonga) (Australia)	2000–01	Rd. 1	Manly-Warringah Sea Eagles	Wing	28	6	0	0	24
6.	Kevin McGuinness	(Australia)	2000–02	Rd. 1	Western Suburbs Magpies	Centre	54	30	1	1	123
7.	Craig Field	(Australia)	2000–01	Rd. 1	Balmain Tigers	Halfback	28	4	7	3	33
8.	Shane Walker	(Australia)	2000–01	Rd. 1	Balmain Tigers	Prop	43	2	0	0	8
9.	Darren Senter	(Australia)	2000–04	Rd. 1	Balmain Tigers	Hooker	96	22	0	0	88
10.	Jason Lowrie	(New Zealand)	2000–01	Rd. 1	Balmain Tigers	Prop	31	2	0	0	8
11.	Mark Stimson	(Australia)	2000	Rd. 1	Balmain Tigers	Second-row	15	1	0	0	4
12.	Jarrod McCracken	(New Zealand)	2000	Rd. 1	Parramatta Eels	Centre	8	1	0	0	4
13.	Tyran Smith	(New Zealand)	2000–01	Rd. 1	Balmain Tigers	Lock, Second-row	42	6	0	0	24
14.	Adam Nable	(Australia)	2000	Rd. 1	Balmain Tigers	Hooker	5	0	0	0	0
15.	John Skandalis	(Australia) (Greece)	2000–06, 2009–10	Rd. 1	Western Suburbs Magpies	Prop	185	16	0	0	64
16.	Steve Georgallis	(Australia) (Greece)	2000	Rd. 1	Western Suburbs Magpies	Halfback	20	1	0	0	4
17.	Mark O'Neill	(Australia)	2000–05	Rd. 1	Balmain Tigers	Second-row	121	11	0	0	44
18.	Ken McGuinness	(Australia)	2000	Rd. 1	Western Suburbs Magpies	Centre	6	0	0	0	0
19.	Ciriaco Mescia	(Australia)	2000–01	Rd. 2	Western Suburbs Magpies	Hooker	38	8	0	0	32
20.	Luke O'Donnell	(Australia) (Republic of Ireland)	2000–03	Rd. 2	Balmain Tigers	Second-row, Lock, Prop	48	3	0	0	12
21.	Matt Seers	(Australia)	2000–02	Rd. 3	North Sydney Bears	Fullback	54	13	0	0	52
22.	Hayes Lauder	(Australia)	2000	Rd. 4	Balmain Tigers	Second-row	10	0	0	0	0
23.	Michael Gillett	(Australia)	2000	Rd. 5	Balmain Tigers	Five-eighth	14	4	0	0	16
24.	Ben Duckworth	(Australia)	2000	Rd. 8	Balmain Tigers	Lock	13	2	0	0	8
25.	Brenton Pomery	(Australia)	2000	Rd. 12	Western Suburbs Magpies	Prop	1	0	0	0	0
26.	Justin Doyle	(Australia)	2000	Rd. 12	South Sydney Rabbitohs	Prop	8	1	0	0	4
27.	Shayne Dunley	(Australia)	2000	Rd. 15	Balmain Tigers	Halfback	1	0	0	0	0
28.	Laloa Milford	(Samoa)	2000	Rd. 17	Balmain Tigers	Wing	1	1	0	0	4
29.	Steven Crouch	(Australia)	2000–02	Rd. 19	Manly-Warringah Sea Eagles	Second-row	30	4	0	0	16
30.	Richard Villasanti	(Australia) (Tonga) (New Zealand)	2000	Rd. 19	Balmain Tigers	Prop	7	1	0	0	4
31.	Dane Morgan	(Australia)	2000	Rd. 20	Melbourne Storm	Second-row	1	0	0	0	0
32.	Ben Galea	(Australia) (Malta)	2000-07	Rd. 21	Balmain Tigers	Second-row	150	32	0	0	128
33.	Trent Robinson	(Australia)	2000–01	Rd. 24	Debut	Prop	3	0	0	0	0
34.	Kylie Leuluai	(New Zealand) (Samoa)	2000	Rd. 25	Balmain Tigers	Prop	2	0	0	0	0
35.	Lee Murphy	(Australia)	2001	Rd. 1	St. George Illawarra Dragons	Fullback	9	2	0	0	8
36.	Corey Pearson	(Australia)	2001–03	Rd. 1	St. George Illawarra Dragons	Prop	55	4	0	0	16
37.	Trent Runciman	(Australia)	2001–02	Rd. 1	Canterbury-Bankstown Bulldogs	Second-row	22	1	0	0	4
38.	John Simon	(Australia)	2001	Rd. 1	New Zealand Warriors	Halfback	18	4	11	1	39
39.	Ben Black	(Australia)	2001	Rd. 4	Debut	Halfback	7	1	0	0	4
40.	Lincoln Withers	(Australia)	2001–03	Rd. 5	Canberra Raiders	Hooker, Halfback	46	13	0	0	52
41.	Hassan Saleh	(Australia) (Lebanon)	2001–02	Rd. 7	South Sydney Rabbitohs	Wing	30	11	1	0	46
42.	Makasini Richter	(Tonga)	2001—02	Rd. 7	Debut	Wing	24	10	0	0	40
43.	Nick Bradley-Qalilawa	(Australia) (Fiji)	2001–03	Rd. 11	Debut	Wing, Centre	27	5	0	0	20
44.	John Wilson	(Australia) (France)	2001–05	Rd. 11	Parramatta Eels	Centre	62	30	0	0	120
45.	Luke Isakka	(Australia)	2001–02	Rd. 11	Debut	Second-row	8	0	0	0	0
46.	Willie Manu	(Australia) (Tonga)	2001–03	Rd. 13	Debut	Second-row, Lock	50	5	0	0	20
47.	Warren Carney	(Australia)	2001	Rd. 15	St. George Illawarra Dragons	Hooker	3	0	0	0	0
48.	Mark O'Halloran	(Australia) (United States) (Republic of Ireland)	2001, 2003	Rd. 18	Debut	Centre	28	6	0	0	24
49.	Ben Jeffries	(Australia)	2001–02	Rd. 18	St. George Illawarra Dragons	Halfback, Five-eighth	27	7	5	0	38
50.	Anthony Laffranchi	(Australia) (Italy)	2001–06	Rd. 26	Debut	Second-row, Prop, Lock	102	18	0	0	72
51.	Ahmad Bajouri	(Lebanon)	2002	Rd. 1	Debut	Wing	9	2	0	0	8
52.	Robert Mears	(Australia)	2002–04	Rd. 1	Leeds Rhinos	Hooker	57	15	0	0	60
53.	Chris Paterson	(Australia)	2002–04, 2006	Rd. 1	Debut	Prop	27	1	0	0	4
54.	Steve Trindall	(Australia)	2002–03	Rd. 1	Northern Eagles	Prop	29	0	0	0	0
55.	Troy Wozniak	(Australia)	2002–03	Rd. 1	Parramatta Eels	Second-row	26	9	0	0	36
56.	Balin Cupples	(Australia)	2002–03	Rd. 9	Debut	Wing	4	0	0	0	0
57.	Glen Air	(Australia)	2002	Rd. 14	London Broncos	Halfback	1	0	0	0	0
58.	Daniel Fitzhenry	(Australia)	2002–07, 2010	Rd. 14	Debut	Wing, Centre, Five-eighth	137	44	0	0	176
59.	Michael Buettner	(Australia)	2003–04	Rd. 1	Parramatta Eels	Centre	16	2	0	0	8
60.	Chris Heighington	(Australia) (England)	2003–12	Rd. 1	Debut	Lock, Second-row, Prop	201	39	0	0	156
61.	Robert Miles	(Australia)	2003–05	Rd. 1	Northern Eagles	Wing, Fullback	28	4	0	0	16
62.	Adam Tippett	(Australia)	2003	Rd. 5	Debut	Halfback	3	0	0	0	0
63.	Robbie Beckett	(Australia)	2003	Rd. 6	Halifax	Wing	4	1	0	0	4
64.	Gray Viane	(New Zealand) (Samoa) (England)	2003	Rd. 6	Debut	Wing	9	0	0	0	0
65.	Luke Covell	(Australia) (New Zealand)	2003–04	Rd. 7	Debut	Wing	22	7	57	0	142
66.	Trent Clayton	(Australia)	2003	Rd. 8	Sydney Roosters	Wing	7	2	0	0	8
67.	Robbie Farah	(Australia) (Lebanon)	2003–16, 2018–19	Rd. 13	Debut	Hooker	277	68	12	16	312
68.	Dene Halatau	(New Zealand) (Niue)	2003–09, 2014–16	Rd. 13	Debut	Lock, Second-row, Centre, Hooker	180	21	0	0	84
69.	Luke Milton	(Australia)	2003	Rd. 16	Sydney Roosters	Wing	1	1	0	0	4
70.	Benji Marshall	(New Zealand)	2003–13, 2018–20	Rd. 20	Debut	Five-eighth, Halfback	257	84	416	13	1181
71.	Clint Hill	(Australia)	2003	Rd. 21	Debut	Prop	1	0	0	0	0
72.	Bryce Gibbs	(Australia)	2003–11	Rd. 24	Debut	Prop	155	3	0	0	12
73.	Dean Collis	(Australia)	2003–09	Rd. 25	Debut	Centre, Wing	80	24	15	0	126
74.	Liam Fulton	(Australia)	2003–08, 2010–14	Rd. 26	Debut	Second-row, Lock, Five-eighth, Hooker	162	37	0	0	148
75.	Shane Elford	(Australia)	2004–06	Rd. 1	Penrith Panthers	Centre, Wing	59	18	0	0	72
76.	Nick Graham	(Australia)	2004	Rd. 1	Wigan Warriors	Lock	10	0	0	0	0
77.	Brett Hodgson	(Australia)	2004–08	Rd. 1	Parramatta Eels	Fullback	102	38	317	0	786
78.	Jason Moodie	(Australia)	2004, 2007	Rd. 1	Parramatta Eels	Wing	31	11	0	0	44
79.	Scott Prince	(Australia)	2004–06	Rd. 1	Brisbane Broncos	Halfback, Five-eighth	73	18	20	3	115
80.	Ben Reynolds	(Australia)	2004–06	Rd. 1	Penrith Panthers	Halfback	8	1	0	0	4
81.	Scott Sattler	(Australia)	2004	Rd. 1	Penrith Panthers	Lock	22	2	0	0	8
82.	Todd Payten	(Australia)	2004–11	Rd. 3	Sydney Roosters	Prop, Lock, Second-row	151	9	0	0	36
83.	Bronson Harrison	(New Zealand)	2004–08	Rd. 4	Debut	Second-row, Prop, Lock	79	10	0	0	40
84.	Jeff Lima	(New Zealand) (Samoa)	2004	Rd. 7	Debut	Prop, Second-row, Lock	2	1	0	0	4
85.	Luke Duffy	(Australia)	2004	Rd. 8	Debut	Wing	2	1	0	0	4
86.	Keiran Kerr	(Australia)	2004	Rd. 11	St. George Illawarra Dragons	Halfback	3	1	0	0	4
87.	Pat Richards	(Australia) (Republic of Ireland)	2004–05, 2014–15	Rd. 15	Parramatta Eels	Wing, Centre, Fullback	82	52	118	2	446
88.	Matt Jobson	(Australia)	2005	Rd. 1	New Zealand Warriors	Second-row	4	0	0	0	0
89.	Matthew Rieck	(Australia)	2005	Rd. 1	Cronulla-Sutherland Sharks	Wing, Centre	6	3	0	0	12
90.	Paul Whatuira	(New Zealand) (Cook Islands)	2005–07	Rd. 1	Penrith Panthers	Centre	58	30	0	0	120
91.	Ray Cashmere	(Australia)	2005, 2012	Rd. 21	Western Suburbs Magpies	Prop	13	1	0	0	4
92.	Shannon McDonnell	(Australia) (Republic of Ireland)	2005–09	Rd. 26	Debut	Fullback, Wing	31	8	0	0	32
93.	Michael Crockett	(Australia)	2006	Rd. 1	Debut	Wing, Centre	8	7	0	0	28
94.	Keith Galloway	(Australia) (Scotland)	2006–13	Rd. 1	Cronulla-Sutherland Sharks	Prop, Second-row	173	6	0	0	24
95.	Jamahl Lolesi	(New Zealand) (Samoa) (Republic of Ireland)	2006	Rd. 1	Canterbury-Bankstown Bulldogs	Centre, Second-row, Wing	22	1	0	0	4
96.	Ryan O'Hara	(Australia) (Republic of Ireland)	2006–08	Rd. 1	Canberra Raiders	Prop	30	1	0	0	4
97.	Sam Harris	(New Zealand) (Australia)	2006	Rd. 2	Manly-Warringah Sea Eagles	Second-row	5	0	0	0	0
98.	Isaac De Gois	(Australia) (Portugal)	2006	Rd. 3	Debut	Hooker	5	1	0	0	4
99.	Stuart Flanagan	(Australia)	2006–08	Rd. 3	Debut	Hooker	20	3	0	0	12
100.	Rocky Trimarchi	(Australia) (Italy)	2006, 2008–09	Rd. 6	Debut	Lock, Second-row	8	1	0	0	4
101.	Taniela Tuiaki	(New Zealand) (Tonga)	2006–09	Rd. 11	Debut	Wing	78	42	0	0	168
102.	Rangi Chase	(New Zealand) (England)	2006	Rd. 17	Debut	Five-eighth, Hooker, Halfback	1	1	0	0	4
103.	Ben Jeffery	(Australia)	2006	Rd. 21	Debut	Wing	3	1	0	0	4
104.	Chris Lawrence	(Australia)	2006–20	Rd. 21	Debut	Second-row, Centre, Wing	253	84	3	0	342
105.	Tevita Metuisela	(Australia) (Tonga)	2006, 2008	Rd. 21	Melbourne Storm	Prop, Second-row	4	0	0	0	0
106.	Keith Eshman	(Australia)	2006	Rd. 22	Debut	Five-eighth	1	0	0	0	0
107.	Jarrod Saffy	(South Africa) (Australia) (Lebanon)	2006–07	Rd. 26	Debut	Second-row, Prop, Lock	8	0	0	0	0
108.	John Morris	(Australia)	2007–09	Rd. 1	Parramatta Eels	Hooker, Five-eighth, Halfback	72	11	0	1	45
109.	Danny Galea	(Australia) (Malta)	2007–09	Rd. 8	Penrith Panthers	Second-row, Centre, Lock	34	1	0	0	4
110.	Ben Te'o	(New Zealand) (Australia) (Samoa)	2007–08	Rd. 9	Debut	Second-row, Centre, Lock, Prop	36	10	0	0	40
111.	Beau Ryan	(Australia)	2007–12	Rd. 16	Debut	Wing, Centre, Fullback	104	46	0	0	184
112.	Shannon Gallant	(Australia)	2007–09	Rd. 19	Debut	Fullback	12	4	2	0	20
113.	Corey Payne	(Australia)	2008–09	Rd. 1	St. George Illawarra Dragons	Second-row, Lock, Prop	41	2	0	0	8
114.	Peni Tagive	(Australia) (Fiji) (United States)	2008–09	Rd. 1	Debut	Wing, Centre	8	3	0	0	12
115.	Tim Moltzen	(Australia)	2008–13	Rd. 1	Debut	Fullback, Halfback, Five-eighth, Centre	90	39	2	0	160
116.	Rhys Hanbury	(Australia)	2008–09	Rd. 2	South Sydney Rabbitohs	Fullback, Centre	19	4	0	0	16
117.	Mathew Head	(Australia)	2008	Rd. 5	St. George Illawarra Dragons	Halfback	11	1	0	0	4
118.	Daine Laurie	(Australia) (Nigeria)	2008-09	Rd. 15	Debut	Prop, Second-row	26	4	0	0	16
119.	Ryan Tandy	(Australia) (Republic of Ireland)	2008	Rd. 15	Hull Kingston Rovers	Prop	2	0	0	0	0
120.	Gareth Ellis	(England)	2009–12	Rd. 1	Leeds Rhinos	Second-row, Lock	75	10	0	0	40
121.	Willie Mataka	(Australia) (Tonga)	2009–2010	Rd. 10	Debut	Lock, Second-row, Centre	6	1	0	0	4
122.	Blake Ayshford	(Australia)	2009–13	Rd. 11	Debut	Centre, Five-eighth, Lock, Second-row	104	33	0	0	132
123.	Alan Schirnack	(New Zealand)	2009, 2011	Rd. 14	Debut	Second-row, Prop	14	0	0	0	0
124.	Simon Dwyer	(Australia)	2009–11	Rd. 19	Debut	Second-row, Centre, Lock	35	6	0	0	24
125.	Robert Lui	(Australia)	2009–11	Rd. 23	Debut	Halfback, Five-eighth	43	9	0	1	37
126.	David Gower	(Australia) (England)	2009	Rd. 26	Salford City Reds	Prop, Second-row, Lock	1	0	0	0	0
127.	Lote Tuqiri	(Fiji) (Australia)	2010–13	Rd. 1	Brisbane Broncos	Wing, Centre	52	27	0	0	108
128.	Jason Cayless	(Australia) (New Zealand)	2010	Rd. 1	St. Helens RLFC	Prop	3	0	0	0	0
129.	Junior Moors	(New Zealand) (Samoa)	2010, 2012	Rd. 1	Penrith Panthers	Prop, Second-row, Lock	25	0	0	0	0
130.	Mark Flanagan	(England)	2010–11	Rd. 1	Wigan Warriors	Second-row, Five-eighth, Halfback, Lock	27	2	0	0	8
131.	Andrew Fifita	(Australia) (Tonga)	2010–11	Rd. 2	Debut	Prop, Second-row, Lock	39	8	0	0	32
132.	Geoff Daniela	(New Zealand) (Cook Islands)	2010–11	Rd. 2	Penrith Panthers	Centre, Wing	15	4	0	0	16
133.	Jason Schirnack	(New Zealand)	2010–11	Rd. 2	Debut	Second-row, Lock, Hooker	3	1	0	0	4
134.	Mitch Brown	(Australia)	2010–11	Rd. 3	Cronulla-Sutherland Sharks	Wing, Centre, Fullback	40	8	1	0	34
135.	Blake Lazarus	(Australia)	2010	Rd. 6	Debut	Halfback, Fullback	2	0	0	0	0
136.	Nathan Waters	(Australia)	2010	Rd. 8	Debut	Halfback	1	0	0	0	0
137.	Sean Meaney	(Australia)	2010–13	Rd. 13	Debut	Fullback, Centre, Five-eighth, Wing	10	0	0	0	0
138.	Wade McKinnon	(Australia) (Scotland)	2010–11	Rd. 15	New Zealand Warriors	Fullback	22	4	0	0	16
139.	Sam Latu	(Australia) (Tonga)	2010–11	Rd. 22	South Sydney Rabbitohs	Wing	2	0	0	0	0
140.	Ben Murdoch-Masila	(New Zealand)	2010–14	Finals Week 1	Debut	Second-row, Prop, Lock	52	7	0	0	28
141.	Matt Utai	(New Zealand) (Samoa)	2011–13	Rd. 1	Canterbury Bulldogs	Wing, Centre	40	14	0	0	56
142.	Aaron Woods	(Australia)	2011–17	Rd. 1	Debut	Prop	146	12	0	0	48
143.	Jacob Miller	(Australia)	2011–13	Rd. 4	Debut	Halfback, Five-eighth, Hooker	9	2	1	1	11
144.	Matt Groat	(Australia)	2011–13	Rd. 12	Debut	Prop	17	0	0	0	0
145.	Tim Simona	(Australia) (Samoa)	2011–17	Rd. 13	Debut	Centre, Wing, Fullback	79	27	1	0	110
146.	Adam Blair	(New Zealand)	2012–14	Rd. 1	Melbourne Storm	Lock, Prop, Second-row	71	4	0	0	16
147.	James Tedesco	(Australia) (Italy)	2012–17	Rd. 1	Debut	Fullback, Wing, Centre	90	50	0	0	200
148.	Matthew Bell	(Australia)	2012–13	Rd. 1	Penrith Panthers	Prop, Second-row, Lock	32	0	0	0	0
149.	Tom Humble	(Australia)	2012	Rd. 1	Parramatta Eels	Fullback, Halfback, Five-eighth, Hooker	15	2	0	0	8
150.	Joel Reddy	(Australia)	2012–13	Rd. 2	Parramatta Eels	Centre, Wing, Fullback	27	4	0	0	16
151.	Pat Politoni	(Australia) (Tonga)	2012	Rd. 11	Debut	Hooker	1	0	0	0	0
152.	Curtis Sironen	(Australia)	2012–16	Rd. 12	Debut	Five-eighth, Halfback, Second-row, Lock	65	8	4	0	40
153.	Masada Iosefa	(Samoa)	2012–13	Rd. 13	Penrith Panthers	Hooker, Lock	14	3	0	0	12
154.	Marika Koroibete	(Fiji)	2012–14	Rd. 21	Debut	Wing	16	12	0	0	48
155.	Mosese Fotuaika (Note: Mosese Fotuaika was capped at 155 despite never playing a first-grade game, in honour of him after his death.)	(New Zealand) (Tonga)	2013			Prop	0	0	0	0	0
156.	Braith Anasta	(Australia) (Greece)	2013–14	Rd. 1	Sydney Roosters	Second-row, Five-eighth, Lock, Halfback	31	2	4	2	18
157.	Jack Buchanan	(Australia)	2013–16	Rd. 1	Debut	Prop, Second-row, Lock	41	1	0	0	4
158.	Eddy Pettybourne	(New Zealand) (United States)	2013	Rd. 2	South Sydney Rabbitohs	Second-row, Prop	12	0	0	0	0
159.	Ava Seumanufagai	(New Zealand) (Samoa)	2013–17	Rd. 3	Debut	Prop	105	5	0	0	20
160.	Sitaleki Akauola	(New Zealand)	2013	Rd. 5	Debut	Second-row	11	1	0	0	4
161.	Bodene Thompson	(New Zealand)	2013–14	Rd. 5	Gold Coast Titans	Second-row, Centre, Lock	36	7	0	0	28
162.	Sauaso Sue	(New Zealand) (Samoa)	2013–18	Rd. 6	Debut	Second-row, Prop, Lock	116	10	0	0	40
163.	Shaun Spence	(Australia)	2013	Rd. 6	Debut	Second-row, Lock, Prop	9	1	0	0	4
164.	David Nofoaluma	(Australia) (Samoa)	2013–23	Rd. 10	Debut	Wing, Centre	192	100	0	0	400
165.	Jarred Farlow	(Australia)	2013	Rd. 13	Debut	Second-row	1	0	0	0	0
166.	Joel Luani	(Australia) (United States)	2013–14	Rd. 22	Debut	Hooker	9	1	0	0	4
167.	Luke Brooks	(Australia)	2013–23	Rd. 24	Debut	Halfback	203	43	23	7	225
168.	Nathan Brown	(Australia)	2013	Rd. 24	Debut	Prop	1	0	0	0	0
169.	Keith Lulia	(Australia)	2014	Rd. 1	Bradford Bulls	Centre	12	5	0	0	20
170.	Martin Taupau	(New Zealand)	2014–15	Rd. 1	Canterbury Bulldogs	Prop	45	7	0	0	28
171.	Cory Paterson	(Australia)	2014	Rd. 1	Hull Kingston Rovers	Second-row, Lock	9	1	2	0	8
172.	James Gavet	(New Zealand)	2014	Rd. 1	Canterbury Bulldogs	Prop, Second-row	12	1	0	0	4
173.	Kurtis Rowe	(New Zealand)	2014	Rd. 6	Debut	Fullback, Wing	8	0	0	0	0
174.	Blake Austin	(Australia)	2014	Rd. 6	Penrith Panthers	Five-eighth, Hooker	19	7	3	0	34
175.	Mitchell Moses	(Australia)	2014–17	Rd. 17	Debut	Five-eighth, Fullback	67	13	78	3	211
176.	Matthew Lodge	(Australia)	2014–15	Rd. 17	Debut	Prop	12	0	0	0	0
177.	Jy Hitchcox	(Australia)	2014	Rd. 23	Debut	Wing	4	1	0	0	4
178.	Asipeli Fine	(Australia) (Tonga)	2014–16	Rd. 25	Debut	Centre	3	0	0	0	0
179.	Brenden Santi	(Australia)	2014–15	Rd. 25	Debut	Second-row	11	0	0	0	0
180.	Kevin Naiqama	(Fiji)	2015–18	Rd. 1	Penrith Panthers	Wing	90	35	0	0	140
181.	Kyle Lovett	(Australia)	2015–17	Rd. 1	Debut	Second-row	50	2	0	0	8
182.	Delouise Hoeter	(Tonga)	2015	Rd. 4	Debut	Wing	7	0	0	0	0
183.	Lamar Liolevave	(New Zealand)	2015	Rd. 4	Debut	Second-row	1	0	0	0	0
184.	Nathan Milone	(Australia)	2015–16	Rd. 13	Debut	Centre	6	0	0	0	0
185.	Manaia Cherrington	(New Zealand)	2015–16	Rd. 13	Debut	Hooker	16	1	0	0	4
186.	Josh Drinkwater	(Australia)	2015–16	Rd. 17	St. George Illawarra Dragons	Halfback	1	0	0	0	0
187.	Jordan Rankin	(Australia)	2016–17	Rd. 1	Hull F.C.	Centre, Wing	23	7	28	0	84
188.	Jack Littlejohn	(Australia)	2016–17	Rd. 1	Manly Warringah Sea Eagles	Halfback	17	0	0	0	0
189.	Tim Grant	(Australia)	2016–18	Rd. 1	South Sydney Rabbitohs	Prop	46	2	0	0	8
190.	Josh Aloiai	(New Zealand) (Samoa)	2016–20	Rd. 1	Debut	Second-row	90	10	0	0	40
191.	Joel Edwards	(Australia)	2016–17	Rd. 7	Canberra Raiders	Second-row	20	1	0	0	4
192.	Josh Addo-Carr	(Australia)	2016	Rd. 7	Debut	Wing	9	6	0	0	24
193.	JJ Felise	(Australia)	2016–17	Rd. 7	Debut	Prop	13	0	0	0	0
194.	Michael Chee-Kam	(New Zealand) (Samoa)	2016–21	Rd. 9	Manly Warringah Sea Eagles	Second-row, Centre	89	11	0	0	44
195.	Justin Hunt	(Australia)	2016	Rd. 10	St. George Illawarra Dragons	Fullback, Wing	1	0	0	0	0
196.	Elijah Taylor	(New Zealand)	2016–20	Rd. 10	Penrith Panthers	Lock, Second-row	80	6	0	0	24
197.	Matt Ballin	(Australia)	2016–17	Rd. 11	Manly Warringah Sea Eagles	Hooker	3	0	0	0	0
198.	Jacob Liddle	(Australia)	2016–22	Rd. 18	Debut	Hooker	75	12	0	0	48
199.	Jamal Idris	(Australia)	2017	Rd. 1	Penrith Panthers	Centre	5	0	0	0	0
200.	Matt McIlwrick	(New Zealand)	2017–18	Rd. 1	Cronulla-Sutherland Sharks	Hooker	27	2	0	0	8
201.	Moses Suli	(Australia) (Tonga)	2017	Rd. 1	Debut	Wing, Centre	16	2	0	0	8
202.	Malakai Watene-Zelezniak	(New Zealand)	2017–18	Rd. 10	Penrith Panthers	Wing, Centre	25	9	0	0	36
203.	Tuimoala Lolohea	(New Zealand) (Tonga)	2017–18	Rd. 13	New Zealand Warriors	Five-eighth, Fullback	19	5	47	0	114
204.	Esan Marsters	(Cook Islands) (New Zealand)	2017–19	Rd. 13	Debut	Second-row	61	17	96	0	260
205.	Matt Eisenhuth	(Australia)	2017–20	Rd. 15	Debut	Second-row, Lock	70	4	0	0	16
206.	Alex Twal	(Australia) (Lebanon)	2017–	Rd. 17	Debut	Prop	165	2	0	0	8
207.	Bayley Sironen	(Australia)	2017	Rd. 25	Debut	Second-row	2	0	0	0	0
208.	Jeremy Marshall-King	(New Zealand)	2017	Rd. 26	Debut	Hooker	1	0	0	0	0
209.	Corey Thompson	(Australia)	2018–20	Rd. 1	Widnes Vikings	Wing, Fullback	43	19	0	0	76
210.	Russell Packer	(New Zealand)	2018–21	Rd. 1	St. George Illawarra Dragons	Prop	33	1	0	0	4
211.	Pita Godinet	(New Zealand)	2018	Rd. 1	Manly Warringah Sea Eagles	Hooker, Halfback	9	0	0	0	0
212.	Robbie Rochow	(Australia)	2018–19	Rd. 1	Melbourne Storm	Second-row, Lock	12	1	0	0	4
213.	Ben Matulino	(New Zealand)	2018–19	Rd.1	New Zealand Warriors	Prop	36	1	0	0	4
214.	Josh Reynolds	(Australia)	2018–20	Rd. 6	Canterbury Bulldogs	Five-eighth, Hooker	22	3	0	0	12
215.	Mahe Fonua	(Tonga)	2018–19	Rd. 8	Hull F.C.	Wing	21	6	0	0	24
216.	Chris McQueen	(Australia) (England)	2018–20	Rd. 11	Gold Coast Titans	Second-row	10	0	0	0	0
217.	Tyson Gamble	(Australia)	2018	Rd. 16	Debut	Five-eighth	1	0	0	0	0
218.	Moses Mbye	(Australia)	2018–21	Rd. 17	Canterbury-Bankstown Bulldogs	Fullback	63	9	39	0	114
219.	Luke Garner	(Australia)	2018–22	Rd. 18	Debut	Second-row	75	23	0	0	92
220.	Paul Momirovski	(Australia)	2019	Rd. 1	Sydney Roosters	Centre	11	8	21	0	74
221.	Robert Jennings	(Tonga)	2019–20	Rd. 1	South Sydney Rabbitohs	Centre, Wing	23	8	0	0	32
222.	Ryan Matterson	(Australia)	2019	Rd. 1	Sydney Roosters	Second-row	24	5	0	0	20
223.	Thomas Mikaele	(New Zealand)	2019–22	Rd. 1	Debut	Prop	66	0	0	0	0
224.	Oliver Clark	(Australia)	2019–20	Rd. 9	Debut	Prop	16	0	0	0	0
225.	Tommy Talau	(Australia)	2019–23	Rd. 23	Debut	Centre, Five-eighth	48	20	0	0	80
226.	Joseph Leilua	(Samoa)	2020–21	Rd. 1	Canberra Raiders	Centre	21	6	0	0	24
227.	Adam Doueihi	(Australia)	2020–	Rd. 1	South Sydney Rabbitohs	Fullback, Centre	85	27	174	1	485
228.	Billy Walters	(Australia)	2020–21	Rd. 1	Melbourne Storm	Hooker, Halfback, Five-eighth	10	1	0	0	4
229.	Luciano Leilua	(Samoa)	2020–22	Rd. 1	St. George Illawarra Dragons	Second-row, Prop	57	11	0	0	44
230.	Zane Musgrove	(Samoa)	2020–22	Rd. 1	South Sydney Rabbitohs	Prop	35	3	0	0	12
231.	Harry Grant	(Australia)	2020	Rd. 3	Melbourne Storm	Hooker	15	3	0	0	12
232.	Alex Seyfarth	(Australia)	2020–	Rd. 3	Debut	Prop	91	10	0	0	32
233.	Sam McIntyre	(Australia)	2020	Rd. 6	Debut	Second-row, Centre	12	1	0	0	4
234.	Reece Hoffman	(Australia)	2020	Rd. 9	Debut	Wing, Centre	1	1	0	0	4
235.	Shawn Blore	(Samoa)	2020–23	Rd. 11	Debut	Second-row	29	1	0	0	4
236.	Asu Kepaoa	(New Zealand)	2020–24	Rd. 13	Debut	Wing	42	13	0	0	52
237.	Daine Laurie	(Australia)	2021–23	Rd. 1	Penrith Panthers	Fullback	49	11	0	0	44
238.	Joe Ofahengaue	(Tonga)	2021–23	Rd. 1	Brisbane Broncos	Prop, Second-row	56	3	0	0	12
239.	James Roberts	(Australia)	2021–22	Rd. 1	South Sydney Rabbitohs	Centre	17	3	0	0	12
240.	James Tamou	(Australia)	2021–22	Rd. 1	Penrith Panthers	Prop	38	4	0	0	16
241.	Stefano Utoikamanu	(New Zealand)	2021–24	Rd. 1	Parramatta Eels	Prop	78	11	0	0	44
242.	Jake Simpkin	(Australia)	2021–24	Rd. 6	Debut	Hooker	41	4	0	0	16
243.	Zac Cini	(Australia)	2021	Rd. 8	Debut	Wing	4	1	0	0	4
244.	Jock Madden	(Australia)	2021–22	Rd. 10	Debut	Halfback	17	3	4	0	20
245.	Tom Amone	(Australia)	2021	Rd. 12	South Sydney Rabbitohs	Prop	8	0	0	0	0
246.	Ken Maumalo	(New Zealand)	2021–22	Rd. 15	New Zealand Warriors	Wing	29	19	0	0	76
247.	Junior Pauga	(New Zealand)	2021–22	Rd. 18	Debut	Centre	4	1	0	0	4
248.	Tukimihia Simpkins	(New Zealand)	2021	Rd. 18	Debut	Prop	5	0	0	0	0
249.	Kelma Tuilagi	(Samoa)	2021–22	Rd. 20	Debut	Second-row	27	2	0	0	8
250.	Oliver Gildart	(England) (United Kingdom)	2022	Rd. 1	Wigan Warriors	Centre	8	1	0	0	4
251.	Jackson Hastings	(United Kingdom)	2022	Rd. 1	Wigan Warriors	Five-eighth	16	0	10	1	21
252.	Tyrone Peachey	(Australia)	2022	Rd. 1	Gold Coast Titans	Lock, Centre, Five-eighth	13	1	0	0	4
253.	Starford To'a	(New Zealand)	2022–	Rd. 3	Newcastle Knights	Wing	61	19	0	0	76
254.	Junior Tupou	(New Zealand)	2022–24	Rd. 10	Debut	Wing	34	10	0	0	40
255.	Fa'amanu Brown	(New Zealand) (Samoa)	2022	Rd. 11	Featherstone Rovers	Five-eighth, Hooker	13	6	0	0	24
256.	Brent Naden	(Australia)	2022–	Rd. 11	Canterbury Bulldogs	Centre, Wing	35	9	0	0	36
257.	Fonua Pole	(New Zealand)	2022–	Rd. 16	Debut	Prop, Lock	77	9	0	0	36
258.	Austin Dias	(New Zealand)	2022	Rd. 16	Debut	Prop	8	0	0	0	0
259.	Justin Matamua	(Australia)	2022–24	Rd. 17	Debut	Second-row	14	0	0	0	0
260.	Tom Freebairn	(Australia)	2022	Rd. 21	Debut	Second-row	5	2	0	0	8
261.	Kitione Kautoga	(Fiji)	2022	Rd. 24	Debut	Second-row, Centre	1	0	0	0	0
262.	David Klemmer	(Australia)	2023–24	Rd. 1	Newcastle Knights	Prop	44	1	0	0	4
263.	Apisai Koroisau	(Australia)	2023–	Rd. 1	Penrith Panthers	Hooker	65	14	77	0	210
264.	Isaiah Papali'i	(New Zealand)	2023–24	Rd. 1	Parramatta Eels	Second-row	39	7	0	0	28
265.	Charlie Staines	(Australia) (Samoa)	2023–25	Rd. 1	Penrith Panthers	Wing, Fullback	38	16	0	0	64
266.	Brandon Tumeth	(Australia)	2023	Rd. 2	Debut	Second-row	1	0	0	0	0
267.	John Bateman	(England) (United Kingdom)	2023–24	Rd. 3	Wigan Warriors	Second-row	32	2	0	0	8
268.	Brandon Wakeham	(Fiji)	2023	Rd. 3	Canterbury Bulldogs	Five-eighth	15	2	27	0	62
269.	Jahream Bula	(New Zealand)	2023–	Rd. 8	Debut	Fullback	57	23	0	0	92
270.	Tallyn Da Silva	(Australia)	2023–25	Rd. 16	Debut	Hooker	22	4	1	0	18
271.	Aitasi James	(New Zealand)	2023	Rd. 19	Debut	Lock, Prop	3	0	0	0	0
272.	Will Smith	(Australia)	2023	Rd. 19	Gold Coast Titans	Five-eighth	3	0	0	0	0
273.	Triston Reilly	(Australia)	2023	Rd. 25	Debut	Centre	3	1	0	0	4
274.	Josh Feledy	(Australia)	2023–24	Rd. 27	Debut	Centre	3	1	0	0	4
275.	Kit Laulilii	(Australia)	2023–	Rd. 27	Debut	Prop, Lock	3	0	0	0	0
276.	Solomona Faataape	(Australia)	2024–24	Rd. 2	Debut	Centre	19	7	0	0	28
277.	Lachlan Galvin	(Australia)	2024-25	Rd. 2	Debut	Five-eighth	31	5	0	0	20
278.	Jayden Sullivan	(Australia)	2024	Rd. 2	St. George Illawarra Dragons	Five-eighth, Halfback	8	1	3	0	10
279.	Aidan Sezer	(Australia)	2024	Rd. 2	Leeds Rhinos	Five-eighth	17	0	20	1	41
280.	Samuela Fainu	(Australia)	2024–	Rd. 2	Manly Warringah Sea Eagles	Second-row	44	9	0	0	36
281.	Justin Olam	(Papua New Guinea)	2024	Rd. 3	Melbourne Storm	Centre	13	6	0	0	24
282.	Latu Fainu	(Tonga)	2024–	Rd. 5	Debut	Halfback	33	5	0	0	20
283.	Solomon Alaimalo	(New Zealand)	2024	Rd. 8	Debut	Wing	8	2	0	0	8
284.	Sione Fainu	(Tonga)	2024–	Rd. 11	Debut	Prop	36	4	0	0	16
285.	Declan Casey	(Australia)	2024	Rd. 12	Canterbury-Bankstown Bulldogs	Centre	1	0	0	0	0
286.	Alex Lobb	(Australia)	2024	Rd. 12	Debut	Wing	3	1	0	0	4
287.	Reuben Porter	(Cook Islands)	2024	Rd. 14	Debut	Second-row, Prop	8	0	0	0	0
288.	Heath Mason	(Australia)	2024–	Rd. 15	Debut	Fullback	14	2	1	0	10
289.	Jordan Miller	(Australia)	2024	Rd. 15	Debut	Prop	2	0	0	0	0
290.	Luke Laulilii	(Australia)	2024–	Rd. 16	Debut	Wing	9	4	0	0	16
291.	Tim Johannssen	(Australia)	2024	Rd. 22	Debut	Prop	1	0	0	0	0
292.	Tony Sukkar	(Australia)	2024–	Rd. 27	Debut	Second-row	16	0	0	0	0
293.	Sunia Turuva	(Fiji)	2025–	Rd. 1	Penrith Panthers	Wing	24	11	0	0	44
294.	Jeral Skelton	(Australia)	2025–	Rd. 1	Canterbury-Bankstown Bulldogs	Wing	15	10	0	0	40
295.	Jarome Luai	(Samoa)	2025–	Rd. 1	Penrith Panthers	Halfback, Five-eighth	21	1	0	0	4
296.	Terrell May	(Samoa)	2025–	Rd. 1	Sydney Roosters	Prop	24	1	0	0	4
297.	Tristan Hope	(Australia)	2025–	Rd. 1	debut	Hooker	5	0	0	0	0
298.	Royce Hunt	(Samoa)	2025–	Rd. 1	Cronulla-Sutherland Sharks	Prop	16	2	0	0	8
299.	Jack Bird	(Australia)	2025–	Rd. 1	St. George Illawarra Dragons	Second-row, Lock	17	0	0	0	0
300.	Charlie Murray	(Australia)	2025–	Rd. 14	Debut	Second-row	5	0	0	0	0
301.	Taylan May	(Samoa)	2025–	Rd. 20	Penrith Panthers	Centre	7	4	0	0	16
302.	Izaac Thompson	(New Zealand)	2025–	Rd. 21	South Sydney Rabbitohs	Wing	1	0	0	0	0
303.	Heamasi Makasini	(Australia)	2025–	Rd. 27	debut	Wing	1	1	0	0	4
