= Cherrington (surname) =

Cherrington is an English surname that may refer to

- Anthony Cherrington (born 1988), New Zealand rugby league footballer
- Ben Mark Cherrington (1885–1980), Chancellor at the University of Denver, U.S.
- Cecil Cherrington (1877–1950), Anglican Bishop
- Dewayne Cherrington (born 1990), American football defensive tackle
- Ernest Cherrington (1877–1950), American journalist
- Kennedy Cherrington (born 1999), Australian rugby league player
- Manaia Cherrington (born 1994), New Zealand rugby league footballer
- Nau Cherrington (1924–1979), New Zealand rugby union player
- Norman Cherrington (1935–2010), English rugby league footballer
- Te Paea Cherrington (c.1878–1937), New Zealand tribal leader
- Peter Cherrington (1917–1945), English cricketer
