= 2012 New South Wales Cup =

- League: New South Wales Cup
- Teams: 13
- Premiers: Newtown Jets
- Runners-up: Balmain Ryde-Eastwood Tigers
- Minor Premiers: Canterbury-Bankstown Bulldogs
- Wooden spoon: Western Suburbs Magpies

Bundaberg Red Cup
- Number of teams: 10
- Premiers: Wentworthville Magpies
- Minor Premiers: The Entrance Tigers
- Runners-up: The Entrance Tigers

Sydney Shield
- Premiers: Wentworthville Magpies
- Runners-up: Cabramatta Two Blues

The 2012 New South Wales Cup was the 105th season of New South Wales's top-level statewide rugby league competition. The competition is contested by eleven teams over a 30 Week Long Season (including Finals), which concludes with the 2012 Grand Final at ANZ Stadium in Sydney.

== Ladder ==
2012 New South Wales Cup season
	Team	Pld	W	D	L	B	PF	PA	PD	Pts
1	Canterbury-Bankstown Bulldogs	24	15	1	8	2	811	456	355	35
2	North Sydney Bears	24	14	3	7	2	709	513	196	35
3	Newcastle Knights	24	14	1	9	2	782	577	+205	33
4	Wentworthville Magpies	24	14	0	10	2	792	534	+258	32
5	Windsor Wolves	24	14	0	10	2	743	536	+207	32
6	Illawarra Cutters	24	13	1	10	2	684	504	+180	31
7	Newtown Jets	24	13	1	10	2	686	540	+146	31
8	Balmain Ryde-Eastwood Tigers	24	13	0	11	2	724	608	+116	30
9	Mounties	24	12	1	11	2	637	616	+21	29
10	Cronulla Sharks	24	12	0	12	2	541	717	-176	28
11	Auckland Vulcans	24	11	0	13	2	650	670	-20	26
12	Manly-Warringah Sea Eagles	24	7	0	17	2	508	876	-368	18
13	Western Suburbs Magpies	24	0	0	24	2	280	1400	-1120	4

== Final Series Chart ==
Qualifying and elimination finals
1	Canterbury-Bankstown Bulldogs	38
4	Wentworthville Magpies	34
5	Windsor Wolves	6
8	Balmain Ryde-Eastwood Tigers	32
6	Illawarra Cutters	30
7	Newtown Jets	36
2	North Sydney Bears	26
3	Newcastle Knights	28

Semi-finals
Wentworthville Magpies	20
Balmain Ryde-Eastwood Tigers	29
Newtown Jets	32
North Sydney Bears	30

Preliminary finals
Canterbury-Bankstown Bulldogs	6
Newtown Jets	34
Balmain Ryde-Eastwood Tigers	26
Newcastle Knights	24

Grand final
Newtown Jets	22
Balmain Ryde-Eastwood Tigers	18

== Grand final ==
Newtown 22 (Daniel Tupou, Jack Bosden, Francis Vaiotu, Nafe Seluini tries; Daniel Mortimer 3 goals) defeated Balmain Ryde-Eastwood 18 (Ava Seumanufagai, Sean Meaney, Josh Davis, Dane Chisholm tries; Sean Meaney goal) at ANZ Stadium, Homebush on 30 September 2012.

== Bundaberg Red Cup ==
The 2012 Bundaberg Red Cup season was the third tier rugby league competition held in New South Wales, after the National Rugby League and New South Wales Cup.

=== Ladder ===
2012 Bundaberg Red Cup - Final Table
	Team	Pld	W	D	L	B	PF	PA	PD	Pts
1	The Entrance Tigers	18	14	0	4	0	605	260	+345	28
2	Wentworthville Magpies	18	13	1	4	0	743	332	+411	27
3	Windsor Wolves	18	13	1	4	0	682	358	+324	27
4	St Johns Eagles	18	13	0	5	0	586	457	+129	26
5	Cabramatta Two Blues	18	12	1	5	0	580	362	+218	25
6	Mount Pritchard Mounties	18	11	0	7	0	642	471	+171	22
7	Auburn Warriors	18	5	2	11	0	446	614	-168	12
8	Burwood North Ryde	18	3	0	15	0	400	720	-320	6
9	Blacktown Workers	18	2	1	15	0	372	904	-532	5
10	Kingsgrove Colts	18	1	0	17	0	244	822	-578	2

=== Finals ===
Qualifying / Elimination Finals
2	Wentworthville	36
3	Windsor	16
4	St Johns Eagles	20
5	Cabramatta	24

Major / Minor Semi-finals
1	The Entrance	16
Wentworthville	14
Windsor	14
Cabramatta	20

Preliminary Final
Wentworthville	28
Cabramatta	18

Grand Final
The Entrance	14
Wentworthville	16

=== Grand final ===
Wentworthville 16 (Cecil McKenzie, Mitch Stanfield, Pat Mataele tries; Aaron Fluke 2 goals) defeated The Entrance 14 (Mark Falaniko, Tim Nawaqatabu tries; Jake Fitzpatrick 3 goals) at St Mary's League Stadium on September 22, 2012.
