= Seumanufagai =

Seumanufagai is a surname. Notable people with the surname include:

- Ava Seumanufagai (born 1991), New Zealand rugby league footballer
- Tasia Seumanufagai (born 1989), New Zealand rugby league footballer, cousin of Ava Seumanufagai
