= Christopher Patterson =

Christopher Patterson may refer to:

- Chris Patterson (co-driver) (born 1968), rally co-driver
- Chris Patterson (politician) (born 1971), Australian politician
- Christopher Salmon Patterson (1823–1893), Canadian Puisne judge of the Supreme Court of Canada
- Christopher Stuart Patterson (1842–1924), American lawyer and dean of the University of Pennsylvania Law School

== See also ==
- Chris Paterson (born 1978), Scottish rugby union player
- Chris Paterson (rugby league) (born 1980), Australian
- Patterson (surname)
