= Luke Duffy (disambiguation) =

Luke Duffy may refer to:-

- Luke Duffy (1890–1961), Irish trade unionist and Labour Party politician
- Luke Duffy (rugby league) (born 1980), Rugby League footballer
- Luke Duffy (footballer) (born 1999), English footballer, see 2022–23 Northern Premier League
