= Cherrington (disambiguation) =

Cherrington is a village in Shropshire, England. Cherrington may also refer to

- Cherrington (surname)
- Tibberton and Cherrington, a parish in Shropshire, England
