= Dean Britt =

Australian rugby league footballer

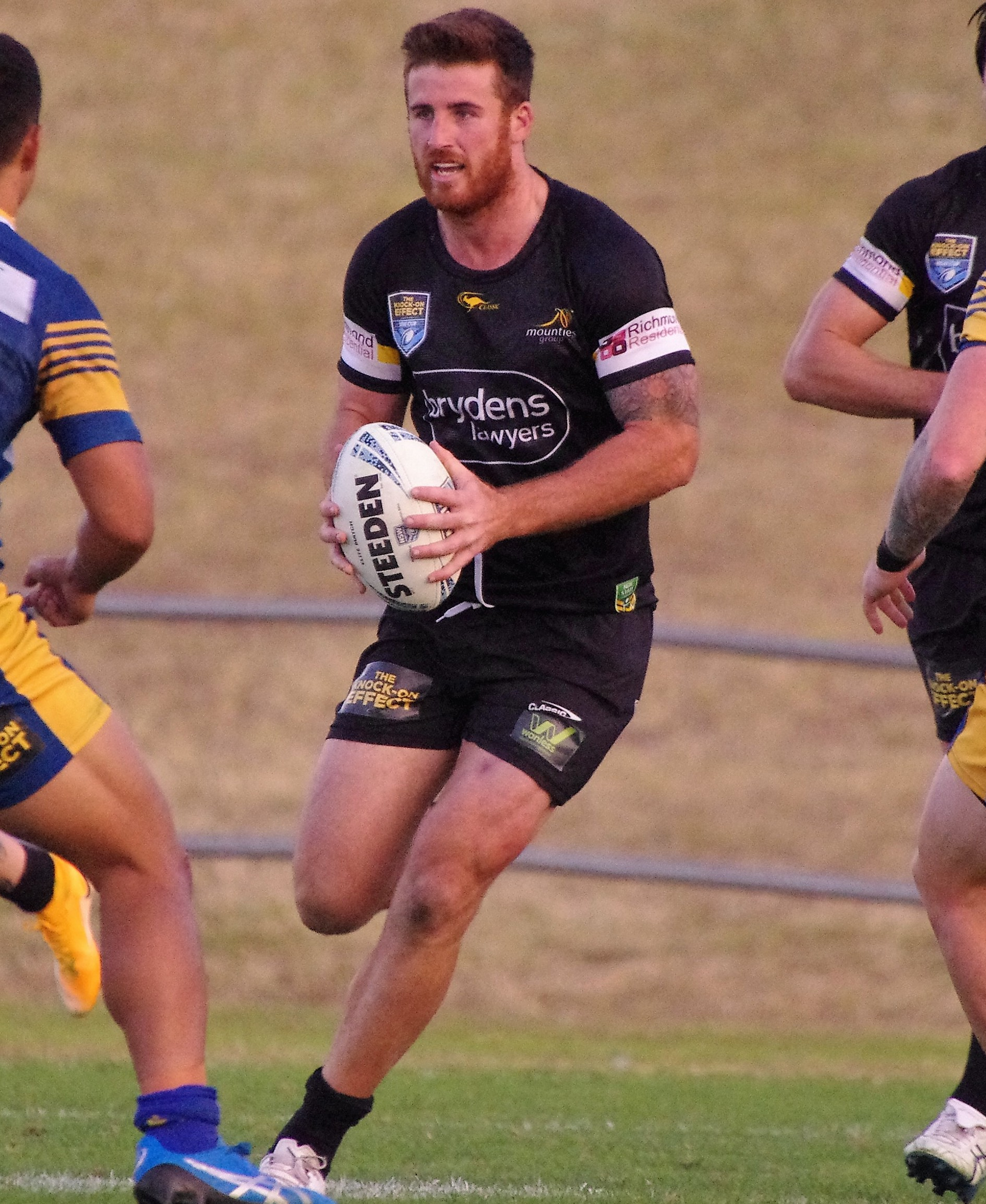

Personal information
- Born: 17 March 1994 (age 32) Camden, New South Wales, Australia
- Height: 193 cm (6 ft 4 in)
- Weight: 98 kg (15 st 6 lb)

Playing information
- Position: Second-row, Prop
Club
Years	Team	Pld	T	G	FG	P
2017	Melbourne Storm	1	0	0	0	0
2017–19	South Sydney	16	1	0	0	4
2020–21	Canterbury Bulldogs	12	0	0	0	0
	Total	29	1	0	0	4
Representative
Years	Team	Pld	T	G	FG	P
2017	Queensland Residents	1	1	0	0	4
2018–19	NSW Residents	2	3	0	0	12
- Source: As of 7 January 2024
- Education: St Gregory's College, Campbelltown
- Father: Darren Britt

Dean Britt (born 17 March 1994) is an Australian professional rugby league footballer who last played as a second-row forward for the Canterbury-Bankstown Bulldogs in the NRL.

He previously played for the Melbourne Storm and the South Sydney Rabbitohs in the National Rugby League.

== Background ==
Britt was born in Camden, New South Wales, Australia, and is the son of Australian international Darren Britt. Britt was educated at St Gregory's College, Campbelltown.

Dean played his junior rugby league for the Camden Rams, before being signed by the Melbourne Storm.

== Playing career ==
=== Early career ===
From 2012 to 2014, Britt played for the Melbourne Storm NYC team.

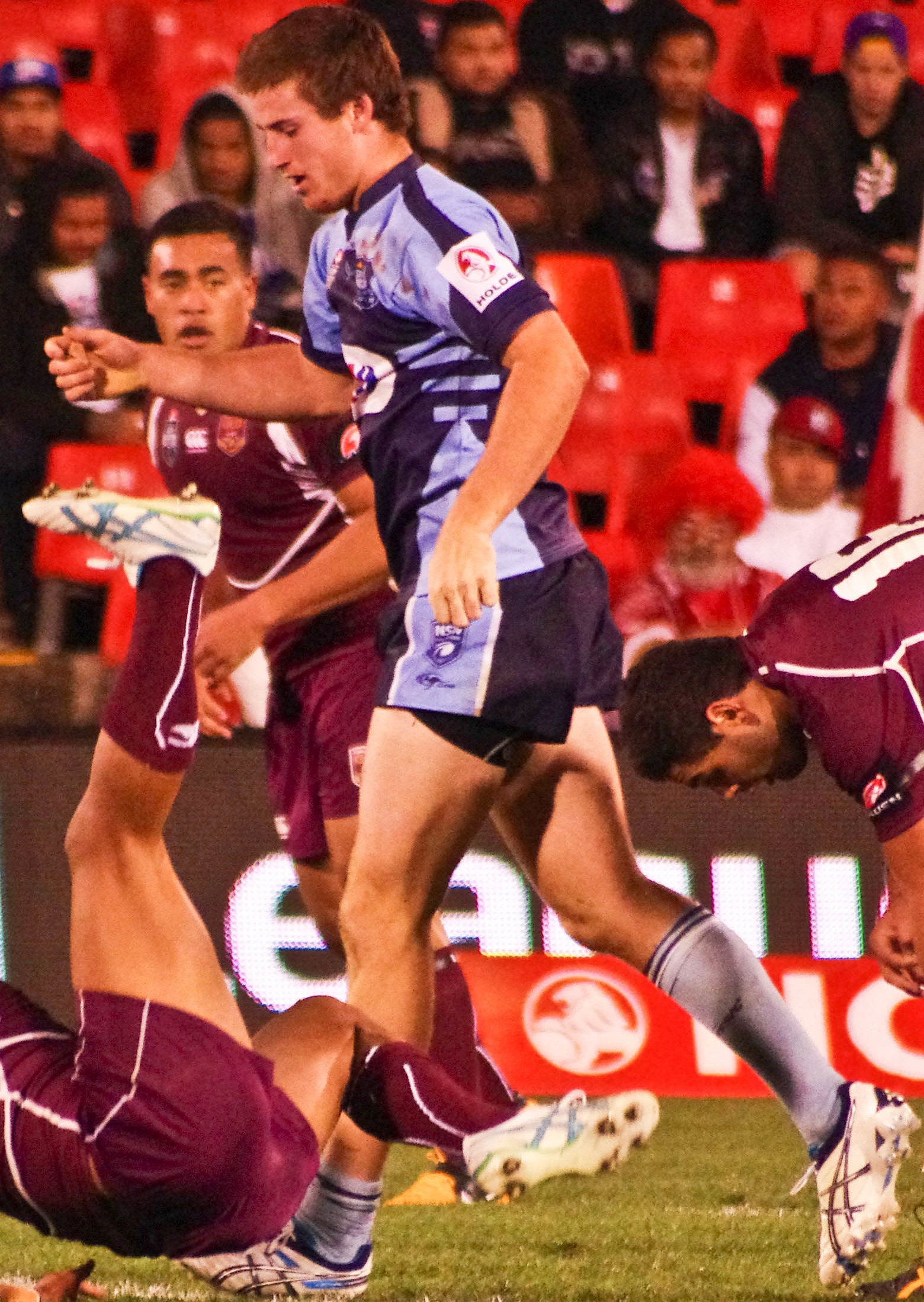
Britt playing for the NSW under 20s side in 2013

In April 2013, he played for the New South Wales under-20s team against the Queensland under-20s team.

In May 2014, he played for the New South Wales under-20s team against Queensland for a second year in a row.

In 2015, he graduated to the Storm's Queensland Cup team, Eastern Suburbs Tigers. In August 2015, he re-signed with the Melbourne club on a two-year contract until the end of 2017.

=== 2017 ===
In May, Britt played for the Queensland Residents against the New South Wales Residents. In June, he signed a 2-year contract with the South Sydney Rabbitohs starting in 2018. In round 15 of the 2017 NRL season, he made his NRL debut for the Melbourne side against the North Queensland Cowboys.

In July, Britt joined South Sydney early for the remainder of the 2017 season in a player swap with Melbourne for Robbie Rochow.

In preparation for getting ready to make his debut with South Sydney, Britt was placed with the North Sydney Bears in the Intrust Super Premiership NSW, making his debut for North Sydney on 9 July 2017, in their 22-6 win over the Wyong Roos.

=== 2018 ===
On 12 June 2018, Britt was selected to play for the NSW residents side against the QLD residents side. On 24 June, Britt scored a try in NSW residents 36-20 victory over QLD. Britt spent the majority of the season playing in reserve grade for North Sydney but was called up to the Souths side for their round 25 51-10 victory over the Wests Tigers. Britt was then retained in the Souths squad for their three finals matches, the 29-28 loss to Melbourne, 13-12 victory over St. George and the 12-4 preliminary final loss to Eastern Suburbs.

=== 2019 ===
On 6 May, Britt was selected for the Canterbury Cup NSW residents side to play against the Queensland residents representative team. On 12 August, Britt signed a two-year deal with Canterbury-Bankstown that would start in 2020.

=== 2020 ===
Britt made his debut for Canterbury-Bankstown in round 1 of the 2020 NRL season against arch rivals Parramatta. Canterbury would go on to lose the match 8-2.

Britt made 11 appearances for Canterbury in the 2020 NRL season. The club finished in 15th place on the table, only avoiding the Wooden Spoon by a better for and against over bottom placed Brisbane.

=== 2021 ===
On 31 August, Britt was one of twelve players who were told by Canterbury that they would not be offered a contract for the 2022 season and would be released at seasons end.
