= Alan Rothery =

Australian rugby league footballer

Personal information
- Full name: Alan Rothery
- Born: 19 February 1983 (age 43) Rockhampton, Queensland, Australia
- Height: 191 cm (6 ft 3 in)
- Weight: 104 kg (16 st 5 lb)

Playing information
- Position: Second-row, Lock
Club
Years	Team	Pld	T	G	FG	P
2004–07	Canberra Raiders	25	0	0	0	0
Representative
Years	Team	Pld	T	G	FG	P
2007	NSW Residents	1	0	1	0	2
- Source: As of 9 January 2024

Alan Rothery (born 19 February 1983) is an Australian former professional rugby league footballer who played in the 2000s, he last played for the Central Queensland Comets in the Queensland Cup. He played as a second-row or lock. He had previously played for the Canberra Raiders in the NRL.
