= Shaun Foley =

Australian rugby union & league player

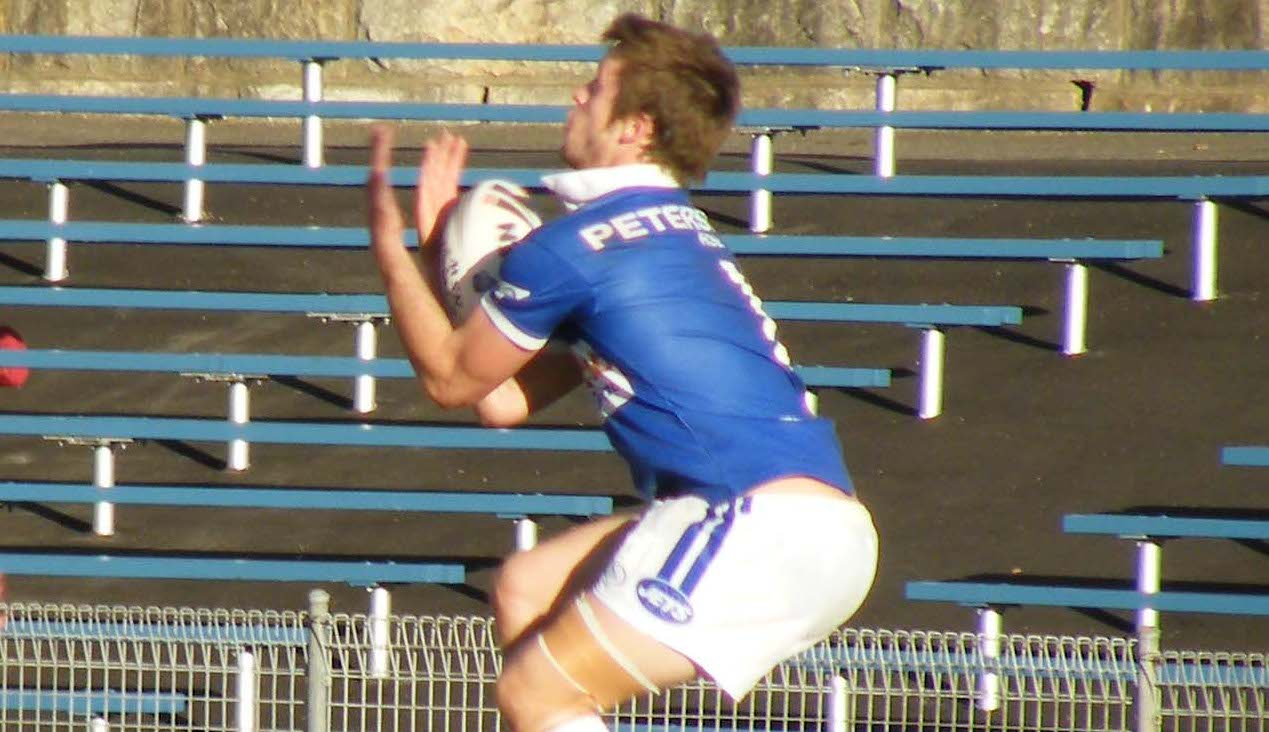

Personal information
- Born: 29 August 1986 (age 39) Sydney, New South Wales, Australia
- Height: 181 cm (5 ft 11 in)
- Weight: 85 kg (13 st 5 lb)

Playing information

Rugby league
- Position: Fullback
Club
Years	Team	Pld	T	G	FG	P
2006	Sydney Roosters	9	6	0	0	24
Representative
Years	Team	Pld	T	G	FG	P
2008	NSW Residents	1	1	0	0	4

Rugby union
- Position: fullback
Club
Years	Team	Pld	T	G	FG	P
2009–	Randwick	23	6	0	0	30
Representative
Years	Team	Pld	T	G	FG	P
2009	Australia (sevens)	6	2	0	0	10
- As of 9 January 2024

Shaun Foley (born 29 August 1986 in Sydney, New South Wales, Australia) is an Australian former professional rugby union player and a former member of the National Rugby League's (NRL) Sydney Roosters squad.

== Playing career ==
Foley played in the Australian Schoolboys Rugby Union team that lost to New Zealand 21–16 in 2004. Foley scored all 16 points for the Australian team.

Foley joined NRL side the Sydney Roosters in 2006, playing seven games and scoring six tries. He scored two tries in the Sydney Roosters 40–20 victory over the North Queensland Cowboys. Foley signed with the club until the end of 2008, but suffered from injuries in 2007 and missed most of the 2008 season due to a broken ankle.

After coming off contract in 2008, Foley returned to rugby union with Sydney grade club Randwick, but was called up to the Australian rugby sevens side before his first training session with Randwick.
