= Quakers Hill Destroyers =

Australian rugby league club, based in Quakers Hill NSW

Quakers Hill Destroyers RLFC
Club information
- Full name: Quakers Hill Destroyers Rugby League Football Club
- Colours: Sky Blue; White; Black
- Founded: 1995

Current details
- Ground: Waite Reserve, Quakers Hill
- Competition: Penrith District Rugby League

Quakers Hill Destroyers Rugby League Football Club is an Australian rugby league football club based in Quakers Hill, New South Wales formed in 1995.

== Notable players ==
- Keith Eshman (2006 West Tigers)
- Manaia Cherrington (2015-16 West Tigers)
- Oliver Clark (2019-20 West Tigers)

== See also ==
- List of rugby league clubs in Australia
- Rugby league in New South Wales
