= Campbelltown City Kangaroos =

Australian semi-pro rugby league club

Campbelltown City Kangaroos RLFC
Club information
- Full name: Campbelltown City Kangaroos; Rugby League; Football Club
- Colours: Blue; Gold
- Founded: 1908; 118 years ago

Current details
- Ground: Campbelltown Stadium
- Competition: Macarthur Conference Rugby League

Records
- Premierships: 1946, 1949, 1969, 1970, 1971, 1973, 1974, 1975, 1980, 1983. 2017

Campbelltown City Kangaroos Rugby League Football Club is an Australian semi-professional rugby league football club based in Campbelltown, New South Wales. The club was formed in 1908, after a breakaway from the local Rugby Union club, 'The Wallabies'. The club participates in the Senior CRL Macarthur Conference Rugby League competition (U/18s, Reserve Grade and 1st Grade), playing its home games out of Fullwood Reserve, Campbelltown South. They are currently coached by Nathan Wilson and Clay Harding.

The Campbelltown City Kangaroos Junior Rugby League Football Club, plays its home games in the Southern Suburbs District Junior Rugby League, and trains at Stromeferry Reserve, St Andrews, New South Wales.

== Notable players ==
- Russell Aitken
- Shaun Devine
- Francis Fainifo
- Shannon Gallant
- Johnny Greaves
- Jarryd Hayne
- David Nofoaluma
- Frank Pritchard
- Aseri Laing
- Tim Sheens
- Luke Swain
- Elijah Taylor
- Vai Toutai
- Rua Ngatikaura
- Justin Matamua
- Heamasi Makasini
- Onitoni Large
