= Charlie Leaeno =

Samoa international rugby league footballer

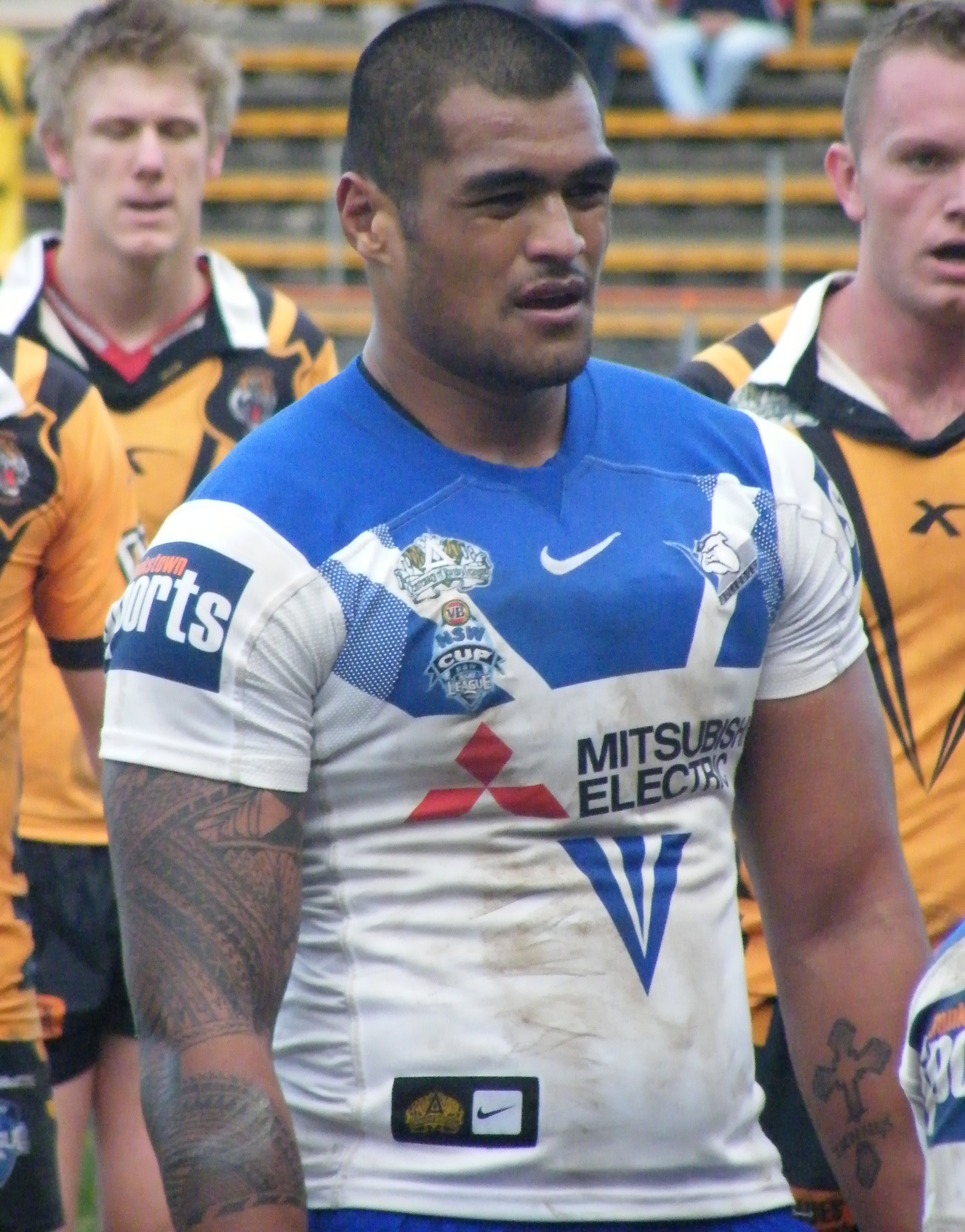

Personal information
- Full name: Charles Leaeno
- Born: 15 February 1986 (age 40) American Samoa

Playing information
- Height: 190 cm (6 ft 3 in)
- Weight: 120 kg (18 st 13 lb)

Rugby league
- Position: Prop
Club
Years	Team	Pld	T	G	FG	P
2006	St. George Illawarra	6	3	0	0	12
2008–09	Canterbury-Bankstown	8	0	0	0	0
2010	Wakefield Trinity Wildcats	11	2	0	0	8
	Total	25	5	0	0	20
Representative
Years	Team	Pld	T	G	FG	P
2005	Samoa
2007	NSW Residents	1	1	0	0	4

Rugby union
Club
Years	Team	Pld	T	G	FG	P
2011–2013	Parramatta Two Blues	12	3	0	0	15

Charlie Leaeno (born 15 February 1985) is an American Samoan professional rugby league footballer who plays for the Lithgow Workies in the Group 10 competition. Leaeno has previously played with the Wakefield Trinity Wildcats in the Super League, the Canterbury-Bankstown Bulldogs in the National Rugby League and the St. George Illawarra Dragons and the Newtown Jets in the NSW Cup also had a stint with the Parramatta Two Blues in rugby union. Leaeno primarily plays as a prop.

== Rugby league career ==
In 2007, Leaeno made his first grade début in the National Rugby League with the St George Illawarra Dragons, playing six matches in the year. In 2008, he joined Canterbury-Bankstown, staying with the club for two seasons.

== Super League ==
In 2010, Leaeno signed with the Wakefield Trinity Wildcats in the Super League. It was confirmed that Leaeno would make his début for the Wakefield Trinity Wildcats against the Wigan Warriors on 13 June after being selected in the 19-man squad. Leaeno quickly became a big hit with the Wakefield Trinity Wildcats fans was given the nickname "Grond".

== Return to Australia ==
Without able to re-join the National Rugby League after his stint in the Super League, Leaeno joined the Kingsgrove Colts in the Ron Massey Cup, a lower based competition in New South Wales.

== Representative career ==
Leaeno was selected to play for Samoa in 2005.
