= Tim Johannssen =

Australian rugby league footballer

Personal information
- Full name: Tim Johannssen
- Born: 21 January 2002 (age 24) Locarno, Ticino, Switzerland
- Height: 189 cm (6 ft 2 in)
- Weight: 100 kg (15 st 10 lb)

Playing information
- Position: Prop, Lock
Club
Years	Team	Pld	T	G	FG	P
2024	Wests Tigers	1	0	0	0	0
- Source: As of 22 July 2025

Tim Johannssen (born 21 January 2002) is an Australian professional rugby league footballer who plays as a prop for the South Sydney Rabbitohs in the NSW Cup, the reserve grade competition for the National Rugby League (NRL).

== Background ==
Johannssen was born in Locarno, Switzerland, and moved to Australia during childhood. He played junior rugby league with the South Tweed Bears.

In 2019, he played for Northern Rivers in the Laurie Daley Cup. He then joined the Newcastle Knights system in 2020, playing for their SG Ball Cup team in 2020 and 2021, progressing through their Jersey Flegg and NSW Cup squads in 2022. Midway through 2022, he moved to the Canterbury-Bankstown Bulldogs and featured in their Jersey Flegg team.

He briefly stepped away from rugby league before returning through the Ryde-Eastwood Hawks in the Sydney Shield and Ron Massey Cup, eventually earning a debut with the Wests Tigers in 2024.

== Playing career ==
=== Wests Tigers ===
Johannssen made his NRL debut in Round 22 of the 2024 season against the North Queensland Cowboys at Leichhardt Oval, coming off the bench in a 48–30 loss.

=== South Sydney Rabbitohs ===
In 2025, Johannssen joined the South Sydney Rabbitohs NSW Cup squad. He has played regularly in the front row rotation, contributing as a middle forward in the club’s reserve grade campaign.
