= Kennedy Cherrington =

Australian rugby league and rugby union footballer (born 1999)

Personal information
- Born: 5 January 1999 (age 27) Sydney, New South Wales, Australia
- Height: 164 cm (5 ft 5 in)
- Weight: 75 kg (11 st 11 lb)

Playing information

Rugby union
- Position: Centre
Club
Years	Team	Pld	T	G	FG	P
2018–20	NSW Waratahs	12	2	0	0	10

Rugby league
- Position: Lock, Prop
Club
Years	Team	Pld	T	G	FG	P
2020	Sydney Roosters	4	0	0	0	0
2021–	Parramatta Eels	34	5	0	0	20
	Total	38	5	0	0	20
Representative
Years	Team	Pld	T	G	FG	P
2021–26	New South Wales	9	0	0	0	0
2021	Māori All Stars	1	0	0	0	0
2023	Prime Minister’s XIII	1	1	0	0	4
- Source: RLP As of 16 November 2026
- Relatives: Anthony Cherrington (cousin); Manaia Cherrington (cousin); Norm Berryman (uncle); Nau Cherrington (grandfather)

Kennedy Cherrington (born 5 January 1999) is a New Zealand international rugby league and rugby union footballer who plays as a lock for Parramatta Eels in the NRL Women's Premiership and the Cronulla-Sutherland Sharks in the NSWRL Women's Premiership.

She previously played rugby union for the NSW Waratahs in the Super W. Also represented Australia at the 2017 Youth Commonwealth Games in the Bahamas. Where her Australian U18s team won Gold. She then represented the Australian Women's 7s side 2 more times at the 2018 Oceania Games (Fiji) winning Gold and the 2019 Pacific Games (Samoa) winning Silver.

== Background ==
Born in Sydney, Cherrington grew up in Perth, Western Australia. Her parents are from New Zealand. She began playing rugby league for the Rockingham Sharks in 2009. Before switching to rugby union in high school when deemed ineligible to continue playing with the boys after U12s.

Cherrington's uncle, Norm Berryman, was a professional rugby union player who played one Test for the All Blacks. Her cousins, Anthony and Manaia Cherrington, are former professional rugby league players who both played in the National Rugby League.

Cherrington is Maori with New Zealand heritage.

== Playing career ==
=== Rugby union ===
In 2017, Cherrington represented the Australian rugby sevens team at the Commonwealth Youth Games in The Bahamas, winning a gold medal.

In 2018, Cherrington joined the NSW Waratahs in the Super W, starting at centre in their 16–13 Grand Final win over the Queensland Reds. In 2019, she came off the bench in the Waratahs' 8–5 Super W Grand Final win over Queensland.

In November 2019, she was a member of the Australia A squad that toured Fiji. In 2020, she began the season playing for the Waratahs before the season was cancelled due to the COVID-19 pandemic.

=== Rugby league ===
In 2020, Cherrington returned to rugby league, joining the Cronulla-Sutherland Sharks in the NSWRL Women's Premiership. On 22 September 2020, she was announced as a member of the Sydney Roosters NRL Women's Premiership team.

In Round 1 of the 2020 NRL Women's season, she made her debut for the Roosters in an 18–4 win over the St. George Illawarra Dragons. On 19 October 2019, she was named the NRLW Rookie of the Year. On 25 October 2020, she came off the bench in the Roosters' 10–20 Grand Final loss to the Brisbane Broncos.

On 28 October 2020, Cherrington was named in the New South Wales State of Origin squad but did not play in their 18–24 loss to Queensland. On 20 February 2021, she represented the Māori All Stars in their 24–0 win over the Indigenous All Stars.

In the round 3 matches of the 2023 NRL Women's season, Cherrington scored a try but was sent off later in the game after she spear-tackled Newcastle's Laishon Albert-Jones during Parramatta's 38-4 Loss. Cherrington would later be given the longest suspension in the competition's history with the player being handed a four-week ban.

On 23 January 2025, it was announced that Cherrington had re-signed with the club until the end of 2027.

== Achievements and accolades ==
=== Individual ===
- NRLW Rookie of the Year: 2020
