= Tasia Seumanufagai =

Samoa international rugby league footballer

Personal information
- Born: 15 September 1989 (age 37) Auckland, New Zealand
- Height: 165 cm (5 ft 5 in)
- Weight: 76 kg (12 st 0 lb)

Playing information
- Position: Lock, Second-row
Club
Years	Team	Pld	T	G	FG	P
2019	New Zealand Warriors	1	0	0	0	0
Representative
Years	Team	Pld	T	G	FG	P
2011	Samoa	1	0	0	0	0
- Source: RLP As of 17 November 2020
- Relatives: Ava Seumanufagai (cousin)

Tasia Seumanufagai (born 15 September 1989) is a New Zealand rugby league footballer who plays for the Wests Tigers in the NSWRL Women's Premiership.

Primarily a lock, she is a Samoan international and previously played for the New Zealand Warriors in the NRL Women's Premiership.

== Background ==
Seumanufagai was born in Auckland and raised in Wellington. Her cousin, Ava, is a professional rugby league player.

== Playing career ==
In 2010, Seumanufagai began playing rugby league for the Randwick Kingfishers. She later moved to Melbourne, where she began playing rugby union before playing rugby league for the Truganina Rabbitohs.

In 2011, she made her Test debut for Samoa against Australia in Apia.

In May 2019, she represented the Combined Affiliated States at the Women's National Championships. In June 2019, she was named in Samoa's squad for their Test against New Zealand but did not play.

On 10 July 2019, she joined the New Zealand Warriors NRL Women's Premiership team. In Round 3 of the 2019 NRL Women's season, she made her debut for the Warriors in a 10–8 win over the Brisbane Broncos.

In 2020, Seumanufagai played for the Wests Tigers in the NSWRL Women's Premiership.
