= Trent Clayton =

France international rugby league footballer

Personal information
- Born: 24 May 1981 (age 45) North Sydney, New South Wales, Australia

Playing information
- Height: 188 cm (6 ft 2 in)
- Weight: 93 kg (14 st 9 lb)
- Position: Wing, Centre
Club
Years	Team	Pld	T	G	FG	P
2001	Sydney Roosters	5	2	0	0	8
2003	Wests Tigers	7	2	0	0	8
2003–04	Penrith Panthers	6	4	0	0	16
2005–08	Toulouse Olympique	9	8	0	0	0
	Total	27	16	0	0	32
Representative
Years	Team	Pld	T	G	FG	P
2004	NSW Residents	1	1	0	0	4
2008	France	1	0	0	0	0

Trent Clayton (born 24 May 1981) is a former French international rugby league footballer. He played for Toulouse Olympique in the Elite One Championship. He primarily played on the wing. He had previously played for the Sydney Roosters, Wests Tigers and Penrith Panthers in the National Rugby League.

== Background ==
Clayton was born in North Sydney, New South Wales, Australia.

== Playing career ==
Clayton played for the Redcliffe Dolphins in the 1998 Queensland Cup.

Clayton was originally named in the France training squad for the 2008 Rugby League World Cup but was removed after failing eligibility criteria.

In 2009, Clayton returned to Australia to play for Redcliffe Dolphins in the Queensland Cup.
