= Nau Cherrington =

New Zealand rugby union player (1924–1979)

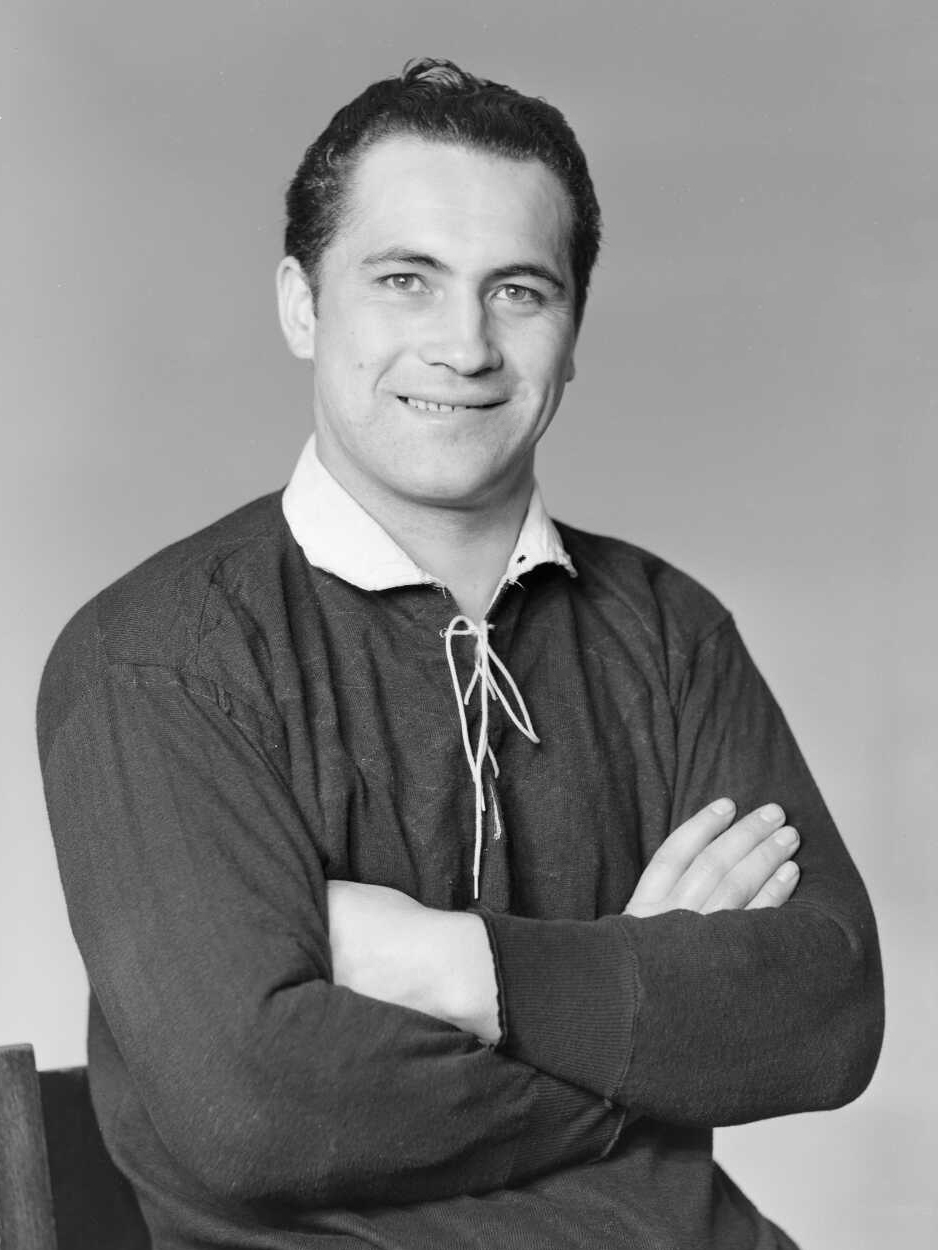
- Born: Nau Paora Cherrington; 5 March 1924 Otiria, New Zealand
- Died: 26 June 1979 (aged 55) Whangārei, New Zealand
- Height: 1.83 m (6 ft 0 in)
- Weight: 89 kg (196 lb)
- School: Kawakawa District High School
- Notable relative(s): Anthony Cherrington (grandson); Manaia Cherrington (grandson); Kennedy Cherrington (granddaughter)

Rugby union career
- Position: Wing
Provincial / State sides
Years	Team	Apps	(Points)
1946–1956	North Auckland	37	(75)
International career
Years	Team	Apps	(Points)
1950–1951	New Zealand	1	(0)
1947–1954	New Zealand Māori	46	

Nau Paora Cherrington (5 March 1924 – 26 June 1979) was a New Zealand rugby union player. A wing, Cherrington represented North Auckland at a provincial level, and was a member of the New Zealand national side, the All Blacks, from 1950 to 1951. He played seven matches for the All Blacks including one international.
