= Jack Bosden =

Australian rugby league footballer

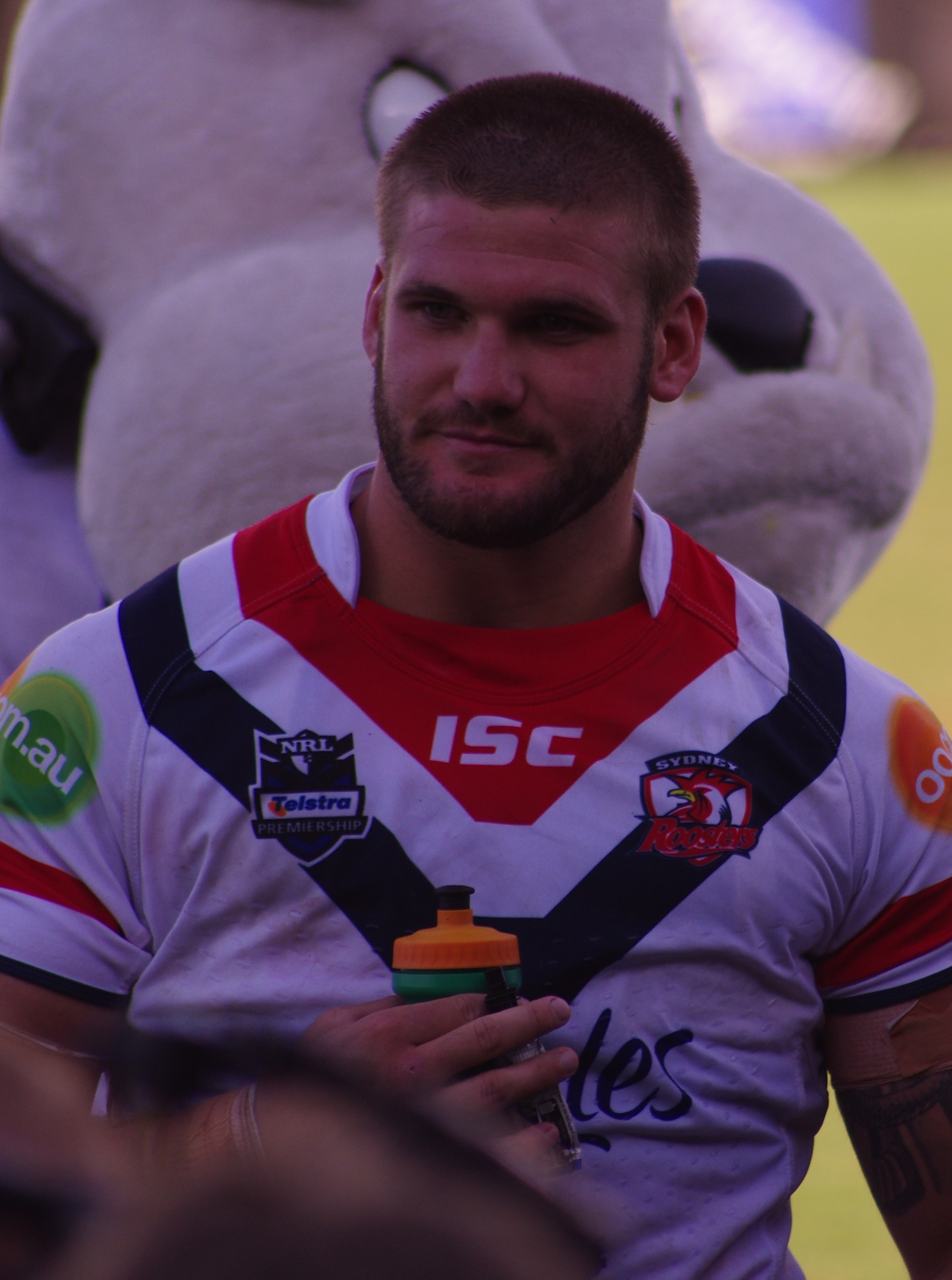
- Bosden whilst playing for the Roosters in 2012

Personal information
- Born: 17 January 1989 (age 37) Sydney, New South Wales, Australia

Playing information
- Height: 184 cm (6 ft 1/2 in)
- Weight: 98 kg (15 st 6 lb; 216 lb)
- Position: Prop, Second-row
Club
Years	Team	Pld	T	G	FG	P
2011	St George Illawarra	4	0	0	0	0
2012–13	Sydney Roosters	4	1	0	0	4
	Total	8	1	0	0	4
- Source: ,

Jack Bosden (born 17 January 1989) is an Australian former professional rugby league footballer who played in the 2010s. He played in the National Rugby League as a front- or second-row forward for the St. George Illawarra Dragons and Sydney Roosters.

== Playing career ==
Born in Sydney, Bosden was originally a Cronulla-Caringbah junior. He made his National Rugby League debut for the St George-Illawarra Dragons in round 9 of the 2011 NRL season.

After initially being touted as following coach Wayne Bennett to the Newcastle Knights at the end of the 2011 season he eventually signed a two-year contract commencing in 2012 with the Sydney Roosters.

Bosden later played for the Western Suburbs Red Devils.
