= Anthony Cherrington =

New Zealand rugby league footballer

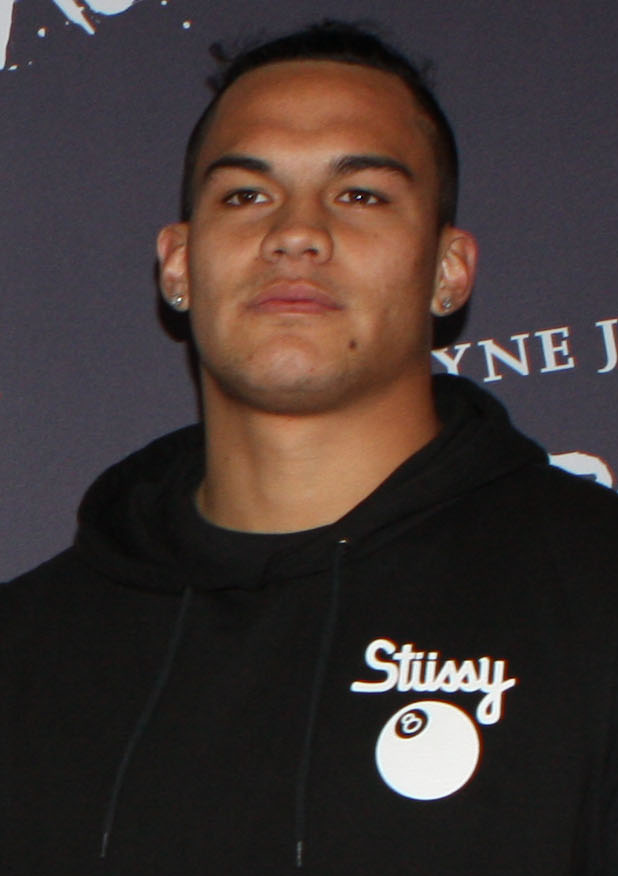

Personal information
- Full name: Nau Paraone Anthony Cherrington
- Born: 21 March 1988 (age 38) Auckland, New Zealand
- Height: 193 cm (6 ft 4 in)
- Weight: 110 kg (17 st 5 lb)

Playing information
- Position: Second-row
Club
Years	Team	Pld	T	G	FG	P
2008–12	Sydney Roosters	19	1	0	0	4
2017	South Sydney	5	0	0	0	0
	Total	24	1	0	0	4
- Source: As of 3 March 2018
- Education: Endeavour Sports High School
- Relatives: Kennedy Cherrington (cousin); Manaia Cherrington (cousin); Nau Cherrington (grandfather)

Nau Paraone Anthony Cherrington (born 21 March 1988) is a professional rugby league footballer who most recently played for the South Sydney Rabbitohs in the National Rugby League.

Cherrington played junior rugby league for the Paddington-Woolahra Tigers. He spent most of the 2007 season in the premier league. At the end of 2007 he was selected for the Junior Kiwis.

On the 13 May 2008 he was named on the bench for his first grade debut against Parramatta Eels with Craig Fitzgibbon, Anthony Tupou, Willie Mason and Nate Myles out of the team for State of Origin.

Cherrington was named in the New Zealand training squad for the 2008 Rugby League World Cup but he was not selected to play.

In 2009, Cherrington came within a "cat's whisker" of being gaoled for assaulting his ex-partner, Monique Mears as she was trying to leave him. Chief Magistrate Graeme Henson said the 21-year-old Sydney Roosters forward had created in his mind the false belief he was special, "some sort of Titan of Mount Olympus". Cherrington was sentenced to 150 hours of community service.

Unfortunately in the 2010 pre-season Cherrington suffered a serious injury which would sideline him for the entire season. Another serious knee injury, this time to his other knee, also wiped him out of the 2011 season. These injuries halted his hopes of following in the footsteps of his idol, Sonny Bill Williams.

On August 18 2017, South Sydney announced that they would not be renewing Cherrington's contract for next season and that he would be departing the club at seasons end. After being left without an NRL club for the 2018 season, Cherrington signed a contract with Group 6 rugby league team The Thirlmere-Tahmoor Roosters.

He is the grandson of Nau Cherrington, who played for the All Blacks from 1950 to 1951.
