= Asipeli Fine =

Tonga international rugby league footballer

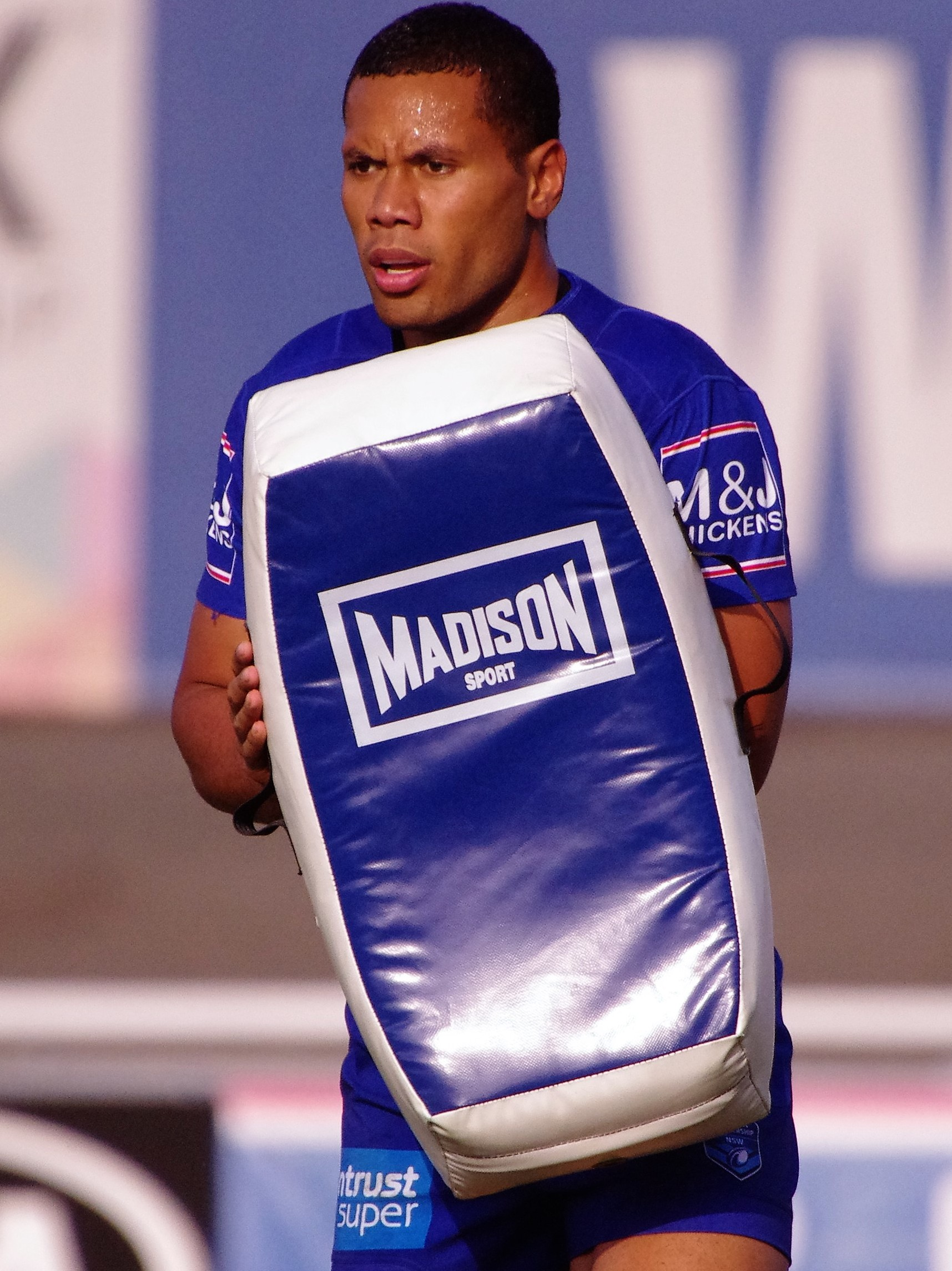

Personal information
- Born: 26 October 1992 (age 34) Sydney, New South Wales, Australia
- Height: 191 cm (6 ft 3 in)
- Weight: 96 kg (15 st 2 lb)

Playing information
- Position: Centre, Second-row
Club
Years	Team	Pld	T	G	FG	P
2014–16	Wests Tigers	3	0	0	0	0
2017–18	Canterbury Bulldogs	10	0	0	0	0
	Total	13	0	0	0	0
Representative
Years	Team	Pld	T	G	FG	P
2014	Tonga	1	1	0	0	4
2016–17	NSW Residents	2	0	0	0	0
- Source: As of 10 January 2024

Asipeli Fine (born 26 October 1992) is a Tonga international rugby league footballer who plays for the Blacktown Workers in the Ron Massey Cup. He plays as a centre, second-row and wing. He previously played for the Wests Tigers and Canterbury-Bankstown Bulldogs.

== Background ==
Fine was born in Sydney, New South Wales, Australia. He attended Waverley College. He played his junior rugby league for the Mascot Jets, before being signed by the Sydney Roosters.

== Playing career ==
=== Early career ===
From 2009 to 2012, Fine played for the Sydney Roosters' NYC team. In 2012, he joined the Wests Tigers NYC team mid-season, before graduating to their New South Wales Cup team in 2013.

=== 2014 ===
On 2 May, Fine was 18th man for Tonga against Samoa. On 19 August, he re-signed with the Tigers on a 2-year contract. Less than a fortnight later, he made his NRL debut for the Tigers against the Canberra Raiders. He finished his debut season in the NRL having played in 2 games. On 21 September, he was named at centre in the 2014 New South Wales Cup Team of the Year.

=== 2015 ===
In September 2015, Fine was named in Tonga's 58-man train-on squad for their match against the Cook Islands.

=== 2016 ===
In Round 9 of the 2016 NRL season, Fine made a return to the Tigers' NRL side after not playing a first-grade game in 2015. On 2 June, he joined the Canterbury-Bankstown Bulldogs mid-season on a contract to the end of 2018. He made his Bulldogs debut in Round 16 against the Brisbane Broncos.

=== 2018 ===
In August 2018, it was announced by Canterbury that Fine was one of the players being released at seasons end. In September 2018, Canterbury held mad monday celebrations at The Harbour View Hotel in Sydney's CBD. Later in the evening, photographs provided by the media showed Canterbury players being heavily intoxicated, stripping naked and vomiting in the street. Fine was handed a $25,000 fine (including $10,000 suspended) by Canterbury after nude images of the player appeared in the media. Fine was also handed a notice to attend court for wilful and obscene exposure.

Following the mad monday incident, Fine suffered a dislocated hip and fractured pelvis while playing for Canterbury's Intrust Super Premiership NSW side. On 1 December, Fine was released by Canterbury after not being offered a new contract for the 2019 season.

=== 2019 ===
In 2019, Fine joined Queensland Cup side Redcliffe.

=== 2025 ===
On 20 January, it was announced that Fine had signed to play with the Glebe Dirty Reds.
