= Oliver Clark (rugby league) =

Australian rugby league footballer

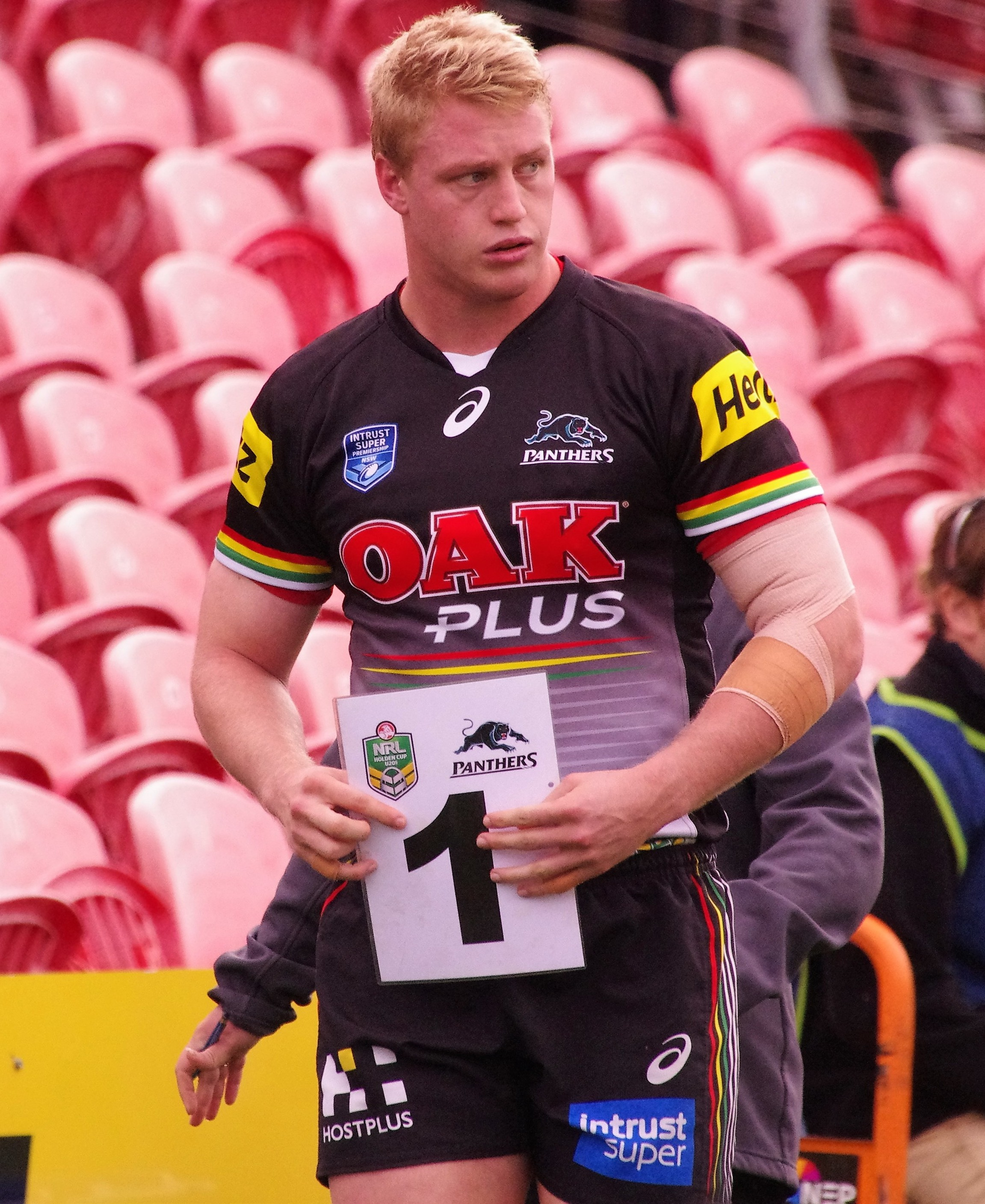

Personal information
- Born: 17 August 1996 (age 28); Sydney, New South Wales, Australia
- Height: 191 cm (6 ft 3 in)
- Weight: 107 kg (16 st 12 lb)

Playing information
- Position: Prop
Club
Years	Team	Pld	T	G	FG	P
2019–20	Wests Tigers	16	0	0	0	0
- Source: As of 27 September 2020

Oliver Clark (born 17 August 1996) is an Australian professional rugby league footballer who plays as a prop. He was previously with the Wests Tigers in the National Rugby League (NRL).

== Background ==
Clark was born in Sydney, New South Wales, Australia.

He played his junior rugby league for Quakers Hill Destroyers.

== Playing career ==
Between 2015 and 2018, Clark played for Penrith in the NSW Cup. In round 9 of the 2019 NRL season, Clark made his NRL debut for the Wests Tigers against the Penrith Panthers at Suncorp Stadium in a 30–4 victory.

On 28 September 2020, Clark was one of eight players who were released by the Wests Tigers.
