= Keith Eshman =

Australian rugby league footballer

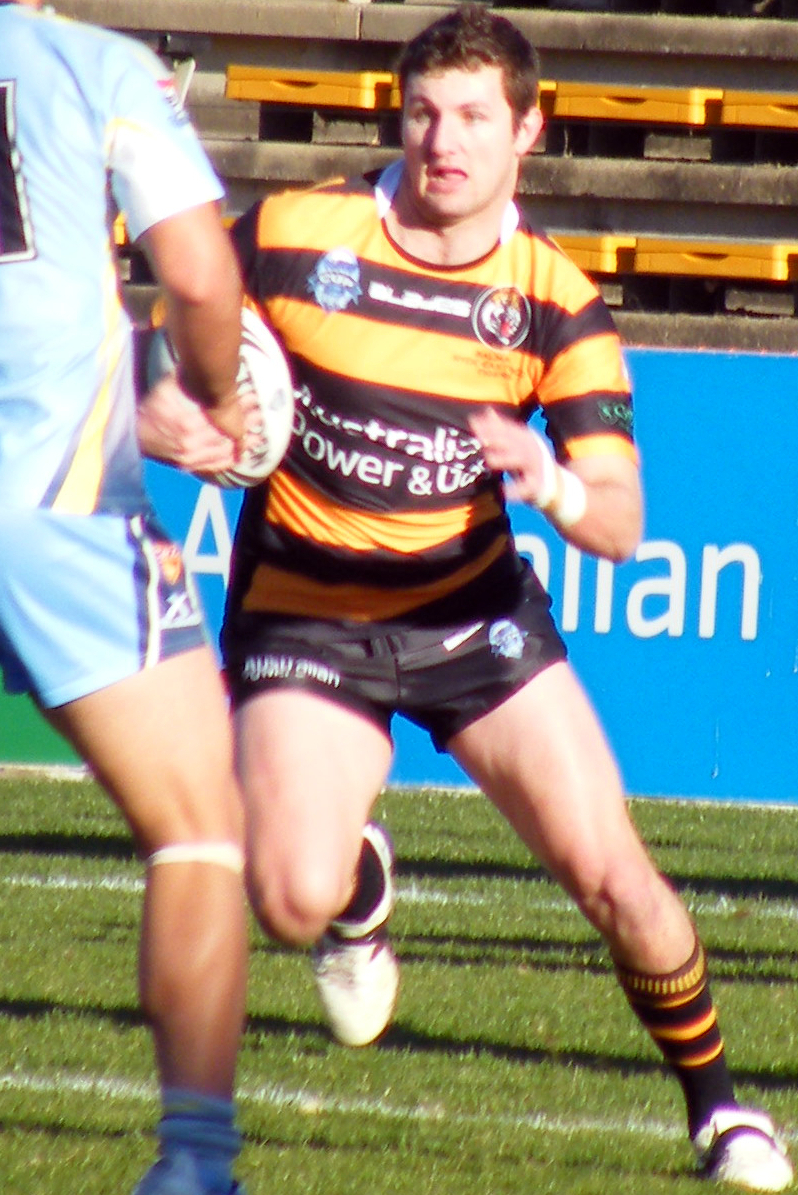

Personal information
- Born: 30 January 1987 (age 39)

Playing information
- Position: Wing
Club
Years	Team	Pld	T	G	FG	P
2006	Wests Tigers	1	0	0	0	0

Keith Eshman is a former professional rugby league footballer who played for the Wests Tigers. He played his junior rugby league for Quakers Hill Destroyers and was educated at Patrician Brothers' College, Blacktown.
