= Peter Cherrington =

English cricketer

Peter Ralph Cherrington (24 November 1917 – 20 January 1945) was an English cricketer active in 1938 who played for Leicestershire. He was born in Newark, Nottinghamshire and died in Burma during the Second World War. He appeared in ten first-class matches as a righthanded batsman who scored 85 runs with a highest score of 33.
