= Nathan Waters =

Australian rugby league footballer

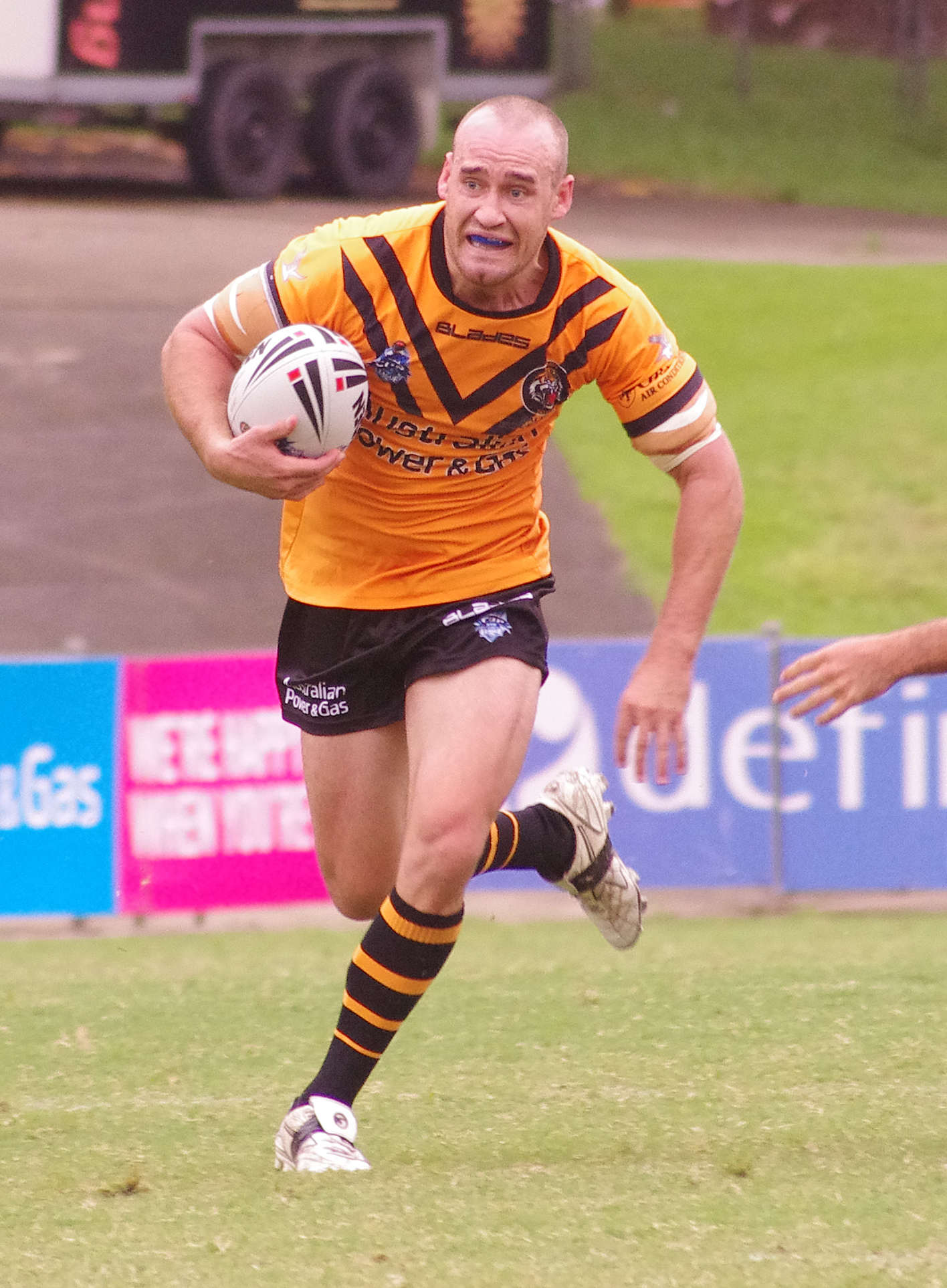
- Waters playing for the Balmain Ryde Eastwood Tigers in 2012

Personal information
- Full name: Nathan Waters
- Born: 14 September 1984 (age 40); Sydney, Australia
- Height: 178 cm (5 ft 10 in)
- Weight: 81 kg (12 st 11 lb)

Playing information
- Position: Halfback, Hooker
Club
Years	Team	Pld	T	G	FG	P
2010	Wests Tigers	1	0	0	0	0
- Source: As of 30 January 2019

Nathan Waters (born 14 September 1984) is an Australian former professional rugby league footballer who played in the 2010s for the Wests Tigers of the National Rugby League. He primarily played as a halfback and as a hooker.

== Playing career ==
Born in Sydney, Waters played his junior football for Eagle Vale before being signed by the Western Suburbs Magpies. He played for the Magpies in the Premier League in 2006 before being signed by the Magpies' affiliate NRL club, Wests Tigers.

In Round 8 of the 2010 NRL season he made his NRL debut for the Tigers against the Sydney Roosters.

Although the Wests Tigers had 2 feeder sides, in 2012 all fringe first-graders were chosen to play in the Balmain Ryde-Eastwood team. Waters was a member of this team when they contested the 2012 NSW Cup Grand Final, narrowly losing.

== Representative career ==
In 2010, Waters played for the NSW Residents team against the QLD Residents.
