= Justin Matamua =

Samoa international rugby league footballer

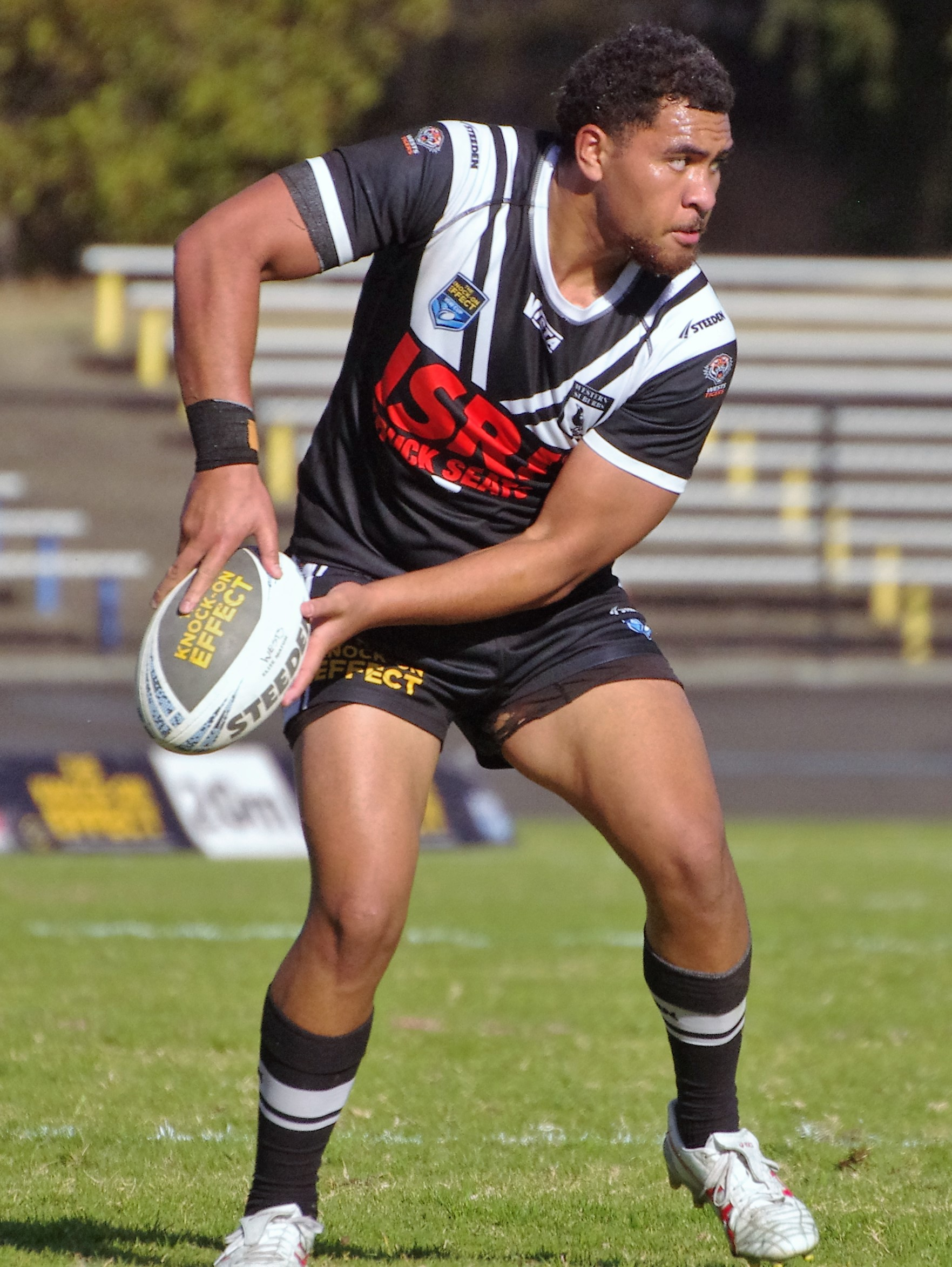

Personal information
- Full name: Justin Matamua
- Born: 27 May 2003 (age 22) Bankstown, New South Wales, Australia
- Height: 187 cm (6 ft 2 in)
- Weight: 103 kg (16 st 3 lb)

Playing information
- Position: Lock
Club
Years	Team	Pld	T	G	FG	P
2022–25	Wests Tigers	14	0	0	0	0
Representative
Years	Team	Pld	T	G	FG	P
2023	Samoa	1	0	0	0	0
- Source: As of 6 July 2024

Justin Matamua (born 27 May 2003) is a Samoa international rugby league footballer who last played as a lock forward for the Wests Tigers in the NRL.

== Background ==
Matamua played his junior rugby league for the Campbelltown City Kangaroos.

== Career ==
=== 2022 ===
Matamua made his first grade debut for the Wests Tigers against the Parramatta Eels in round 17 of the 2022 NRL season. Matamua was sent to the sin bin five minutes into his debut for an illegal shoulder charge on Parramatta's Mitchell Moses during the clubs 28-20 defeat. On 23 November, Matamua was announced to join the Wests Tigers Top-30 playing roster and extended his contract with the club until the end of 2025.

=== 2023 ===
Matamua was limited to only five games for the Wests Tigers in the 2023 NRL season as the club finished with the wooden spoon for a second straight year.

=== 2024 & 2025 ===
Matamua played seven matches for the Wests Tigers in the 2024 NRL season as they finished last on the table. Matamua was one of six players the Wests Tigers farewelled at the end of their 2025 season celebrations. He made no appearances for the club in the 2025 NRL season.
