= Adam Tippett =

Australian rugby league footballer

Personal information
- Full name: Adam Tippett
- Born: 28 November 1979 (age 45)

Playing information
- Position: Scrum-half
Club
Years	Team	Pld	T	G	FG	P
2003	Wests Tigers	3	0	0	0	0
- As of 16 Jul 2021

Adam Tippett (born 28 November 1979) is a former professional rugby league footballer who played for the Wests Tigers.
