= Manaia Cherrington =

New Zealand rugby league footballer

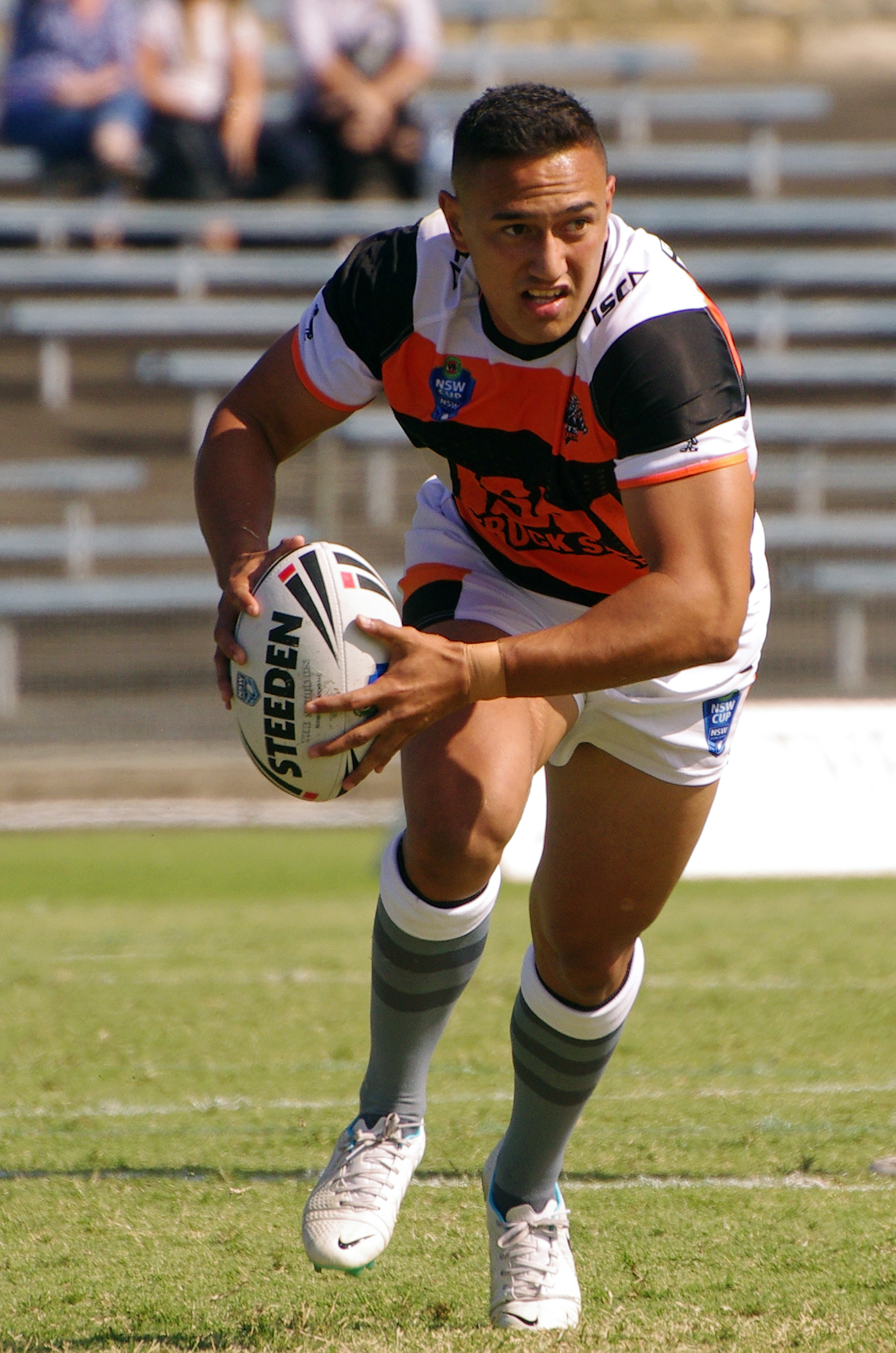
- Cherrington playing for the Tigers in 2015

Personal information
- Born: 2 August 1994 (age 32) Whangārei, New Zealand
- Height: 182 cm (6 ft 0 in)
- Weight: 88 kg (13 st 12 lb)

Playing information
- Position: Hooker, Five-eighth
Club
Years	Team	Pld	T	G	FG	P
2015–16	Wests Tigers	16	1	0	0	4
- Source: As of 16 September 2018
- Education: Endeavour Sports High School
- Relatives: Kennedy Cherrington (cousin); Anthony Cherrington (cousin); Nau Cherrington (grandfather)

Manaia Cherrington (born 2 August 1994) is a New Zealand professional rugby league footballer who plays for the Wests Magpies in the New South Wales Cup. He plays at hooker and previously played for the New Zealand Warriors, Wests Tigers and the Cronulla-Sutherland Sharks.

== Background ==
Born in Whangārei, New Zealand, Cherrington is of Māori descent and moved to Sydney, Australia, aged 12. He played his junior rugby league for the Wentworthville Magpies and Quakers Hill Destroyers, before being signed by the Wests Tigers.

== Playing career ==
=== Early career ===
In 2013 and 2014, Cherrington played for the Wests Tigers' NYC team. On 13 October 2013, he played for the Junior Kiwis against the Junior Kangaroos. On 12 February 2014, he re-signed with the Wests Tigers on a two-year contract. Coach Mick Potter said, "I think Manaia has good speed and awareness around the dummy half and he is still learning and growing so there’s a lot of potential there."

At the end of the year, Cherrington was named at hooker in the 2014 NYC Team of the Year. On 18 October 2014, he again played for the Junior Kiwis against the Junior Kangaroos, this time captaining the side. In 2015, he moved on to the Wests Tigers' New South Wales Cup team.

=== 2015 ===
In round 13, Cherrington made his NRL debut for the Wests Tigers against the Gold Coast Titans. With regular hooker Robbie Farah injured, Cherrington covered the position in tandem with Dene Halatau for four weeks. Later in the season, he returned to first grade, playing off the bench in seven of the last eight games. Cherrington scored his first try in round 19, burrowing over from dummy half against the Broncos.

At the end of the NRL regular season, Cherrington was called up to the senior New Zealand team as part of their train-on squad for their end-of-year tour in Great Britain. He didn't manage to make their final 23-man squad, however, two days after the announcement of the team, Jason Taumalolo was ruled out of the tour with a knee injury. Coach Stephen Kearney recalled Cherrington into the side.

=== 2016 ===
With the Wests Tigers signing Matt Ballin for two seasons and Robbie Farah remaining, Cherrington was one of three hookers at the club in 2016. "I will be honest, I was a bit down (with the situation). But having both players there now, I get to work with two great hookers, I’ll work hard, do the extras and try to give JT some good selection headaches," he said. Due to injuries, Cherrington was the only recognised hooker for the first game of the season. He played the first five games before being dropped to reserve grade.

Despite Ballin and Farah both being absent from first grade later in the season, Cherrington did not return to the team. On 12 August, he signed a one-year contract with the Cronulla-Sutherland Sharks starting in 2017.

=== 2017 ===
On 9 June 2017 Cherrington joined the New Zealand Warriors on a year and a half contract.

=== 2018 ===
Midway through the 2018 NRL season, Cherrington was released from his contract with the Warriors without making an appearance, and signed with the Souths Logan Magpies, making his debut in July.
