= Ava Seumanufagai =

New Zealand rugby league footballer (born 1991)

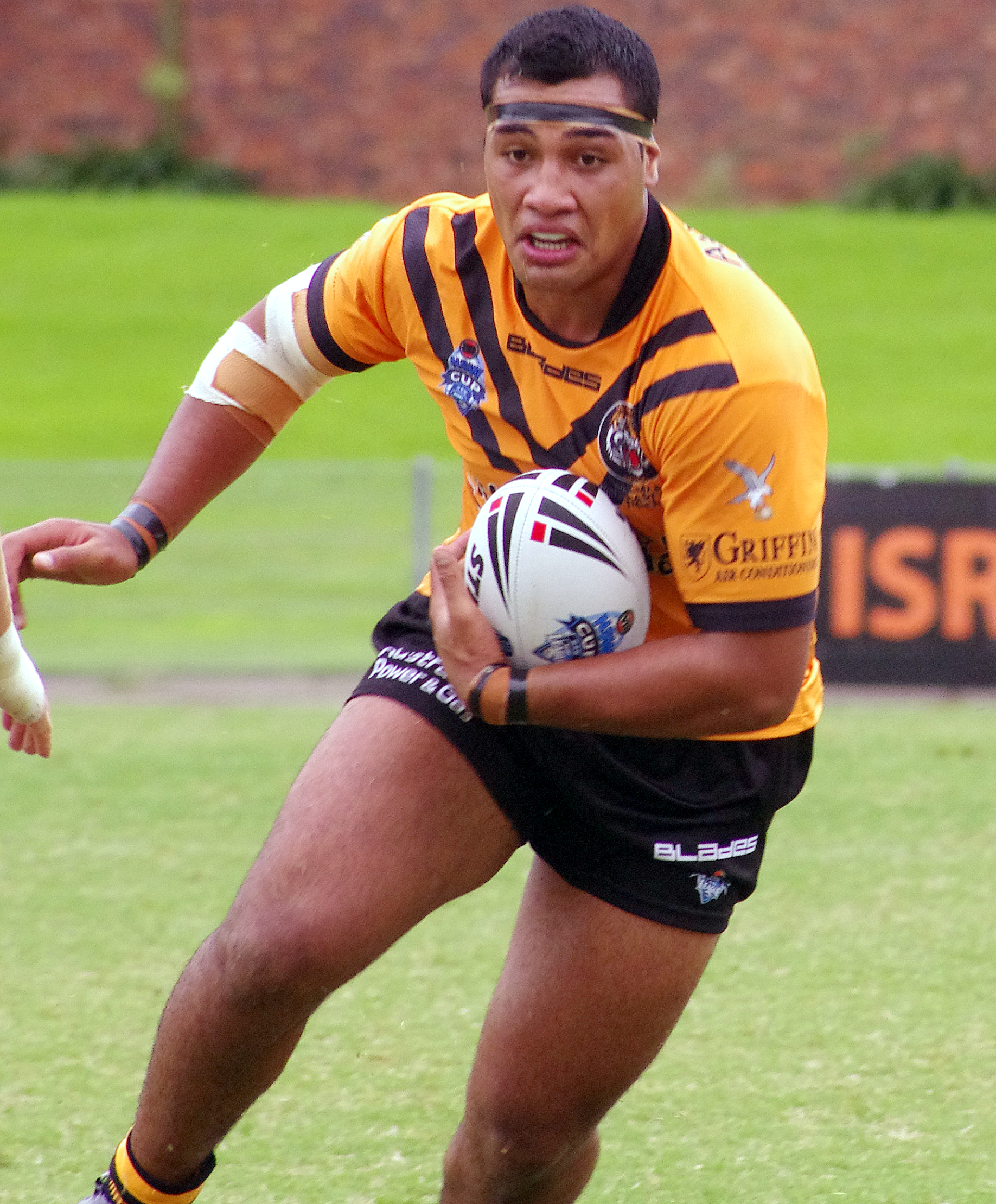

Personal information
- Full name: Ava Seumanufagai
- Born: 3 June 1991 (age 35) Wellington, New Zealand
- Height: 189 cm (6 ft 2 in)
- Weight: 115 kg (18 st 2 lb)

Playing information
- Position: Prop
Club
Years	Team	Pld	T	G	FG	P
2013–17	Wests Tigers	105	5	0	0	20
2018–19	Cronulla Sharks	13	0	0	0	0
2019–20	Leeds Rhinos	33	4	0	0	16
2021–22	Canterbury Bulldogs	23	0	0	0	0
2023	Leigh Leopards	17	1	0	0	4
	Total	191	10	0	0	40
- Source: As of 9 November 2023
- Relatives: Tasia Seumanufagai (cousin)

Ava Seumanufagai (born 3 June 1991) is a New Zealand professional rugby league footballer who is the captain-coach of Campbelltown City Kangaroos. He has previously played for Leigh Leopards in the Super League, Wests Tigers, Cronulla-Sutherland Sharks and Canterbury-Bankstown Bulldogs in the NRL and the Leeds Rhinos in the European Super League.

== Background ==
Seumanufagai was born in Wellington, New Zealand, and is of Samoan descent.

He played his junior football for the Wainuiomata Lions and the Hills District Bulls before being signed by the Parramatta Eels.

== Playing career ==
=== Early career ===
Seumanufagai played for the Parramatta Eels NYC team in 2010 and 2011, scoring 2 tries in 43 games. In 2012, Seumanufagai joined the Wests Tigers. Seumanufagai spent his first season playing NSW Cup, and was a member of the Balmain Ryde Eastwood Tigers side that lost the NSW Cup grand final to the Newtown Jets.

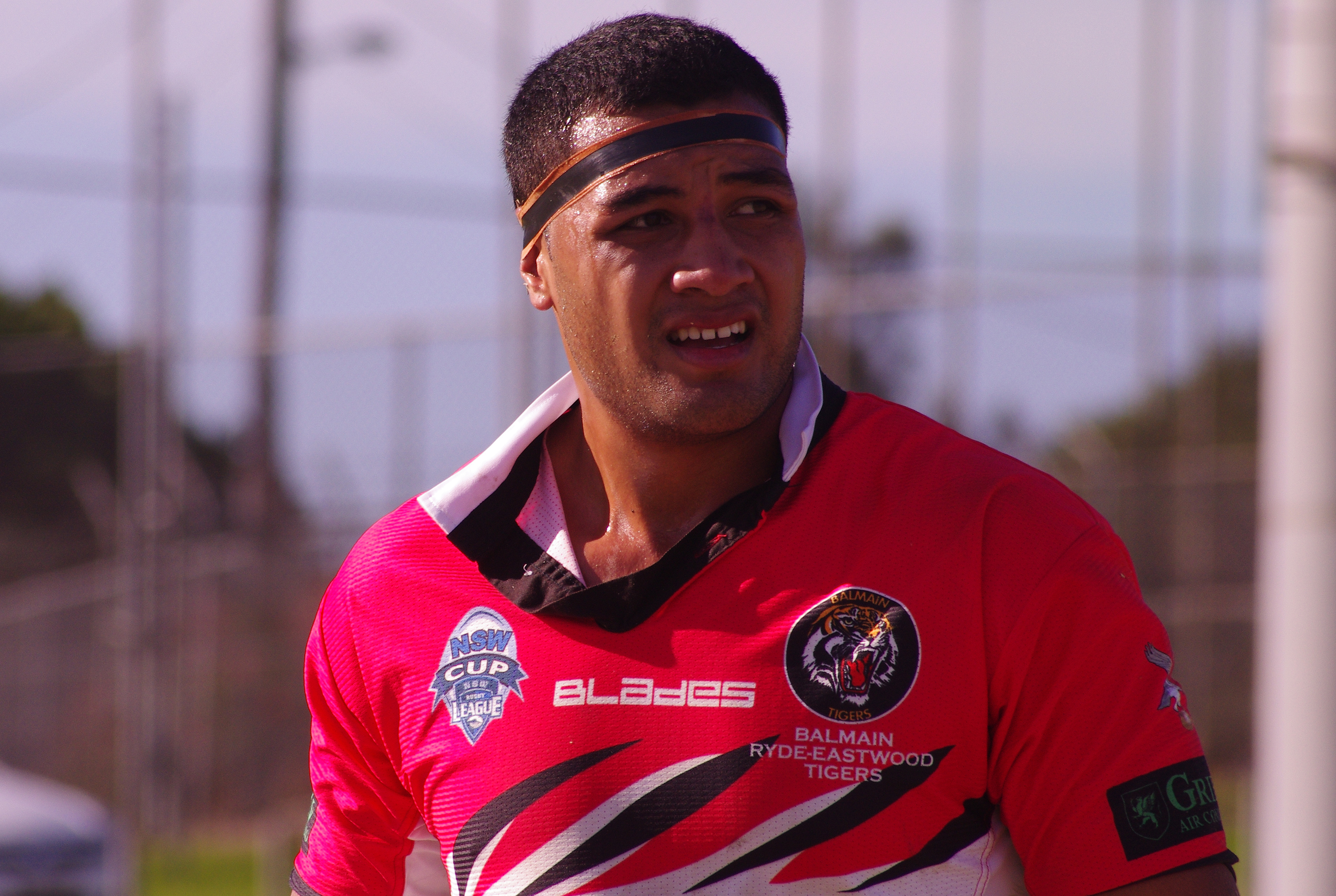
Seumanufagai playing for the Balmain Tigers

=== 2013 ===
In Round 3, Seumanufagai made his NRL debut for the Wests Tigers against his former club, the Parramatta Eels, in the Tigers' 31–18 win at Leichhardt Oval. In Round 13 against the Penrith Panthers, Seumanufagai scored his first NRL try in the Tigers' 20–18 win at Penrith Stadium. It was his sole try from 17 matches for the season.

=== 2014 ===
On 30 July, Seumanufagai re-signed with the Tigers on a one-year contract. Coach Mick Potter said, "Ava has steadily improved as the year has gone on. The players love it when Ava comes on the field, he gives us that lift and really deserves what he is getting." He finished the year having played in 23 matches. He was also named in the Samoa train-on squad for the Four Nations, but didn't make the final 24-man squad.

=== 2015 ===
On 31 January and 1 February, Seumanufagai played for the Tigers in the 2015 NRL Auckland Nines. He made 23 appearances in the 2015 NRL season, all from the interchange bench as well as scoring 1 try for the Tigers. He was named as a reserve in Zero Tackle's Team of the Year. On 30 September, he re-signed with the Tigers for a further two seasons. Coach Jason Taylor said, "Ava is a tireless worker and a real asset to have on our playing roster. He's only 24 years old, so I'm confident that his best football is still ahead of him and that's really exciting for the club."

=== 2016 ===
In the pre-season, Seumanufagai again played in the Auckland Nines. He was one of just two Wests Tigers player to appear in every game of the season. Seumanufagai said that he felt his personal game had improved for the season, and was a step in the right direction.

=== 2017 ===
Seumanufagai again played in the Auckland Nines. On 2 May, he signed a two-year contract with the Cronulla-Sutherland Sharks, starting in 2018. In Round 10 against the South Sydney Rabbitohs, Seumanufagai was sinbinned for punching former Tigers teammate Robbie Farah in the head. In Round 15 against his future club Cronulla, Seumanufagai played his 100th NRL match in the Tigers 24–22 loss at Shark Park. Seumanufagai finished his last season with the Tigers with 2 tries from 18 matches.

=== 2018 ===
In Round 1 of the 2018 NRL season, Seumanufagai made his club debut for the Cronulla-Sutherland Sharks against the North Queensland Cowboys, playing off the interchange bench in the 20–14 loss at 1300SMILES Stadium.

Seumanufagai played for Cronulla's feeder club side Newtown in the 2018 Intrust Super Premiership NSW grand final against Canterbury-Bankstown at Leichhardt Oval which Newtown lost 18–12.

=== 2019 ===
Seumanufagai joined Leeds Rhinos on a two-year deal in May 2019. In his first season he made 13 appearances for the Rhinos scoring one try after making his debut in David Furner's last match in charge – a defeat to Salford on 3 May.

=== 2020 ===
During the disrupted 2020 season Seumanufagai made a further 17 appearances scoring three tries. He played in the Challenge Cup Final where Leeds triumphed 17–16 over Salford. On 27 December 2020 the club announced that they were releasing Seumanufagai from the final year of his contract due to "family reasons" as the travel restrictions in place were preventing him from seeing his young daughter.

=== 2021 ===
He made a total of 16 appearances for Canterbury in the 2021 NRL season as the club finished last and claimed the Wooden Spoon.

=== 2022 ===
Seumanufagai played a total of seven matches for Canterbury in the 2022 NRL season as the club finished 12th on the table.

=== 2023 ===
In January, Seumanufagai signed a one-year deal to join the newly promoted Leigh side. He played 15 games for Leigh in the 2023 Super League season as the club finished fifth on the table and qualified for the playoffs.
