= Sean Meaney =

Australian rugby league footballer

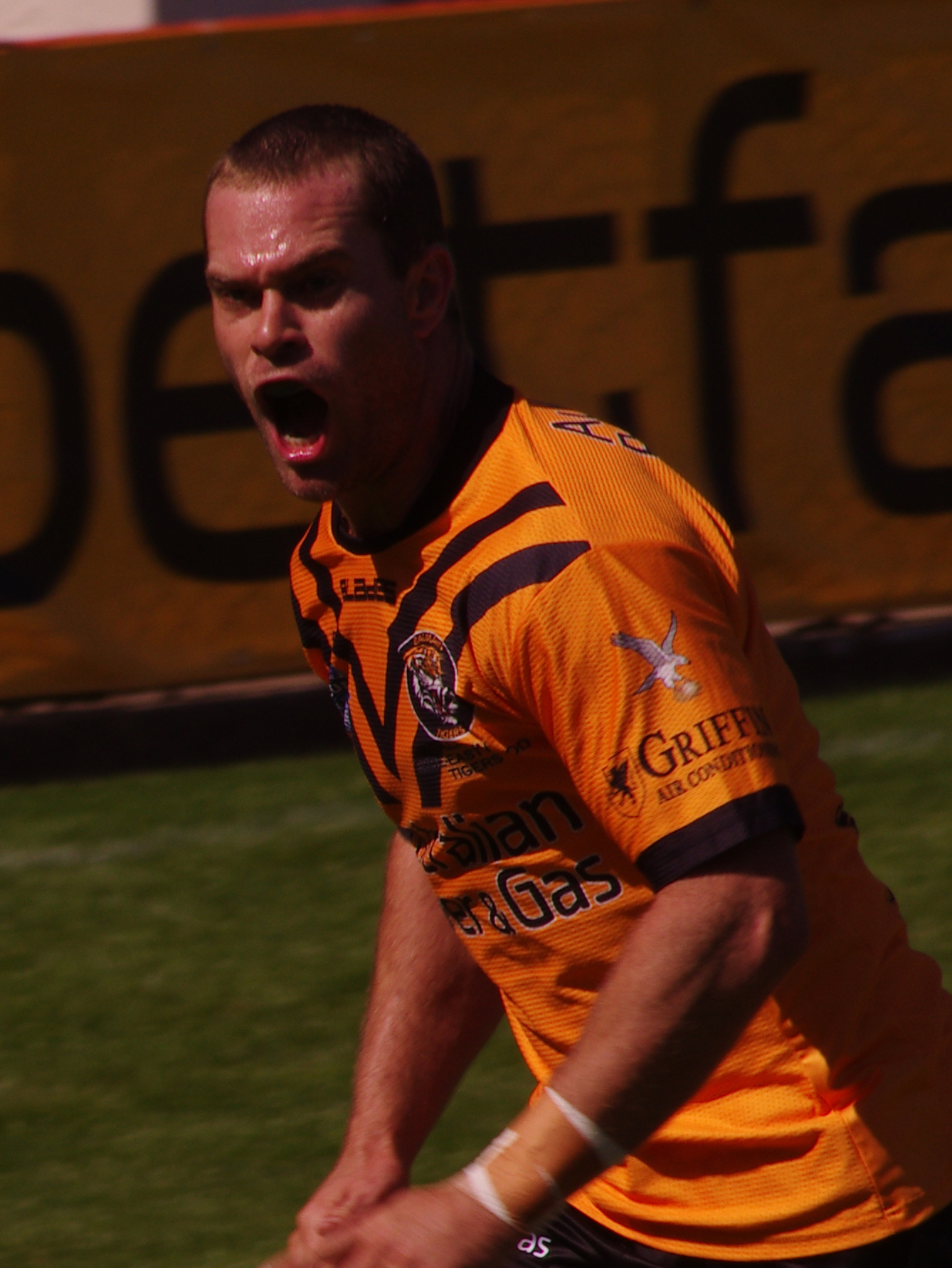

Personal information
- Full name: Sean Meaney
- Born: 8 July 1986 (age 40) Sydney, Australia
- Height: 182 cm (6 ft 0 in)
- Weight: 90 kg (14 st 2 lb)

Playing information
- Position: Fullback, Wing
Club
Years	Team	Pld	T	G	FG	P
2010–13	Wests Tigers	11	0	0	0	0
Representative
Years	Team	Pld	T	G	FG	P
2010	NSW Residents	1	1	2	0	8
- Source: As of 9 January 2024

Sean Meaney (born 8 July 1986) is a former professional rugby league footballer who last played for the Manly Sea Eagles in the NSW Cup. He primarily played at fullback but could also play at five-eighth or on the wing.

== Playing career ==
A Manly junior, Meaney represented New South Wales at an under-17s and under-19s level, before joining the Wests Tigers.

Meaney made his NRL debut from the bench in Round 13, 2010 against the Bulldogs. He made a further appearance in the last game of the regular season, playing fullback after injuries to Wade McKinnon and Chris Lawrence. The rest of the season, Meaney played for feeder-club Balmain-Ryde Eastwood, and was chosen to represent the NSW Residents team.

Meaney was named as the Balmain-Ryde Eastwood captain for the 2011 season. He made a further three appearances on the bench in first grade throughout the season. In 2012, he made another four appearances on the bench early in the season; all losses. However, he was a member of the Balmain Ryde Eastwood Tigers side that lost the NSW Cup grand final.

Covering for an injured James Tedesco, Meaney played in just 2 games in 2013, with both being victories for the Wests Tigers. His contract was not renewed for 2014. Meaney later played in the lower grades at his junior club, the Manly Sea Eagles.
