= Luke Duffy (rugby league) =

Australian rugby league footballer

Personal information
- Born: 21 January 1980 (age 46)

Playing information
- Position: Left wing
Club
Years	Team	Pld	T	G	FG	P
2004	Wests Tigers	2	1	0	0	4
- As of 18 Jul 2021

Luke Duffy (born 21 January 1980) is a former professional rugby league footballer who played for the Wests Tigers.
