= Chris Paterson (rugby league) =

Australian rugby league footballer

Personal information
- Born: 15 October 1980 (age 45) Mackay, Queensland, Australia

Playing information
- Position: Prop
Club
Years	Team	Pld	T	G	FG	P
2002–06	Wests Tigers	27	1	0	0	4

Chris Paterson (born 15 October 1980) is a former professional rugby league footballer who played for the Wests Tigers.
