= Heamasi Makasini =

Australian rugby league footballer

Personal information
- Full name: Heamasi Makasini
- Born: 27 July 2007 (age 19) Orange, New South Wales, Australia
- Height: 192 cm (6 ft 4 in)
- Weight: 105 kg (16 st 7 lb)

Playing information
- Position: Wing, Centre
Club
Years	Team	Pld	T	G	FG	P
2025–	Wests Tigers	15	2	0	0	8
- As of 2 August 2026

Heamasi Makasini (born 27 July 2007) is a professional rugby league footballer who plays as a winger for the Wests Tigers in the National Rugby League.

== Background ==
Makasini was educated at Newington College and played his first grade debut whilst in his final school year. By birth, he is eligible to represent the USA and Tonga.

== Career ==
Makasini made his first grade debut in round 27 of the 2025 NRL season against the Gold Coast Titans, scoring a try.

Makasini began the 2026 NRL season playing every minute in the Wests Tigers' first six games, scoring one try in round 3 in a 20-16 Loss against the South Sydney Rabbitohs. In round 8, Makasini was dropped amidst criticism, with coach Benji Marshall citing "confidence issues" as the reason for his omission. Marshall said, "A lot of people look at it when someone goes back to reserve grade like it's a punishment. Sometimes it's actually the best thing for you to go and learn your trade, get some confidence.

On 28 May 2026, the Wests Tigers announced that Makasini re-signed with the club until the end of 2029.
