= 2013 Rugby League World Cup Group B =

2013 Rugby League World Cup Group B is one of the four groups in the 2013 Rugby League World Cup. The group comprises New Zealand, France, Papua New Guinea and Samoa.

== Ladder ==
Team	Pld	W	D	L	TF	PF	PA	+/−	Pts
New Zealand	3	3	0	0	26	146	34	+112	6
Samoa	3	2	0	1	14	84	52	+32	4
France	3	1	0	2	2	15	78	–63	2
Papua New Guinea	3	0	0	3	5	22	103	–81	0

All times are local – UTC+0/GMT in English venues. UTC+1/CET in French venues. UTC+0/WET in Irish venues. UTC+0/GMT in Welsh venues.

== Papua New Guinea vs France ==
27 October 2013
16:00

Papua New Guinea	8–9	France
Try: MacDonald 17' m Abavu 42' m Goal: Mead (0/3)	Report	Try: Bosc 6' c Goal: Bosc (2/2) 7', 60'; Drop Goal: Barthau (1/1) 64'

MS3 Craven Park, Hull
Attendance: 7,481
Referee: Ben Cummins (Australia)
Player of the Match: William Barthau (France)

FB	1	David Mead
RW	2	Josiah Abavu
RC	3	Menzie Yere
LC	4	Israel Eliab
LW	5	Nene MacDonald
SO	6	Ray Thompson
SH	7	Ase Boas
PR	8	Mark Mexico
HK	9	Paul Aiton (c)
PR	10	Enoch Maki
SR	11	Dion Aiye
SR	12	Jason Chan
LF	13	Neville Costigan
Substitutions:
IC	14	Charlie Wabo
IC	15	Richard Kambo
IC	16	Jessie Joe Nandye
IC	17	Larsen Marabe
Coach:
(Papua New Guinea) Adrian Lam

FB	1	Morgan Escaré
RW	2	Frédéric Vaccari
RC	3	Jean-Philippe Baile
LC	4	Vincent Duport
LW	5	Clint Greenshields
SO	6	Thomas Bosc
SH	7	William Barthau
PR	8	Jamal Fakir
HK	9	Éloi Pélissier
PR	10	Rémi Casty
SR	11	Kevin Larroyer
SR	12	Sébastien Raguin
LF	13	Grégory Mounis
Substitutions:
IC	14	Théo Fages
IC	15	Olivier Elima (c)
IC	16	Benjamin Garcia
IC	17	Michael Simon
Coach:
(England) Richard Agar

Touch Judges:
James Child (England)
Clint Sharrad (England)
Video Referee:
Phil Bentham (England)

== New Zealand vs Samoa ==
27 October 2013
18:00

New Zealand	42–24	Samoa
Try: Hoffman 11' c Mannering (2) 15' c, 22' c Tuivasa-Sheck 17' m Vatuvei (3) 43' m, 49' m, 73' c Luke 45' c Goal: Johnson (5/8) 10', 15', 23', 46', 73'	Report	Try: Roberts 39' m Leilua 52' m Manumalealii 57' m Matagi 60' c A. Winterstein 65' c Goal: Milford (2/5) 61', 65'

Halliwell Jones Stadium, Warrington
Attendance: 14,965
Referee: Richard Silverwood (England)
Player of the Match: Dean Whare (New Zealand)

FB	1	Josh Hoffman
RW	2	Roger Tuivasa-Sheck
RC	3	Dean Whare
LC	4	Bryson Goodwin
LW	5	Manu Vatuvei
SO	6	Kieran Foran
SH	7	Shaun Johnson
PR	8	Jared Waerea-Hargreaves
HK	9	Isaac Luke
PR	10	Jesse Bromwich
SR	11	Frank Pritchard
SR	12	Sonny Bill Williams
LF	13	Simon Mannering (c)
Substitutions:
IC	14	Elijah Taylor
IC	15	Sam Kasiano
IC	16	Sam Moa
IC	17	Frank-Paul Nu'uausala
Coach:
(New Zealand) Stephen Kearney

FB	1	Anthony Milford
RW	2	Antonio Winterstein
RC	3	Junior Sa'u
LC	4	Joseph Leilua
LW	5	Daniel Vidot
SO	6	Reni Maitua
SH	7	Ben Roberts
PR	8	David Fa’alogo
HK	9	Pita Godinet
PR	10	Suaia Matagi
SR	11	Iosia Soliola (c)
SR	12	Frank Winterstein
LF	13	Sauaso Sue
Substitutions:
IC	14	Penani Manumalealii
IC	15	Leeson Ah Mau
IC	16	Mark Taufua
IC	17	Mose Masoe
Coach:
(Australia) Matt Parish

Touch Judges:
Tim Roby (England)
Joe Cobb (England)
Video Referee:
Thierry Alibert (France)

== New Zealand vs France ==
1 November 2013
20:00

New Zealand	48–0	France
Try: Inu 6' c Goodwin 24' c Nu'uausala (2) 39' c, 75' c Johnson (2) 51' c, 55' c Eastwood 65' c Tuivasa-Sheck 80' c Goal: Johnson (8/8) 7', 26', 39', 51', 56', 66', 76', 80'	Report

Parc des Sports, Avignon
Attendance: 17,518
Referee: Phil Bentham (England)
Player of the Match: Shaun Johnson (New Zealand)

FB	1	Kevin Locke
RW	2	Jason Nightingale
RC	3	Bryson Goodwin
LC	4	Krisnan Inu
LW	5	Roger Tuivasa-Sheck
SO	6	Kieran Foran
SH	7	Shaun Johnson
PR	8	Ben Matulino
HK	9	Isaac Luke
PR	10	Jared Waerea-Hargreaves
SR	11	Frank Pritchard
SR	12	Alex Glenn
LF	13	Simon Mannering (c)
Substitutes
IC	14	Elijah Taylor
IC	15	Sam Kasiano
IC	16	Frank-Paul Nu'uausala
IC	17	Greg Eastwood
Coach:
(New Zealand) Stephen Kearney

FB	1	Morgan Escaré
RW	2	Frédéric Vaccari
RC	3	Jean-Philippe Baile
LC	4	Vincent Duport
LW	5	Cyril Stacul
SO	6	Thomas Bosc
SH	7	Theo Fages
PR	8	Olivier Elima (c)
HK	9	Kane Bentley
PR	10	Rémi Casty
SR	11	Kevin Larroyer
SR	12	Sébastien Raguin
LF	13	Andrew Bentley
Substitutes
IC	14	Gregory Mounis
IC	15	Jamal Fakir
IC	16	Benjamin Garcia
IC	17	Michael Simon
Coach:
(England) Richard Agar

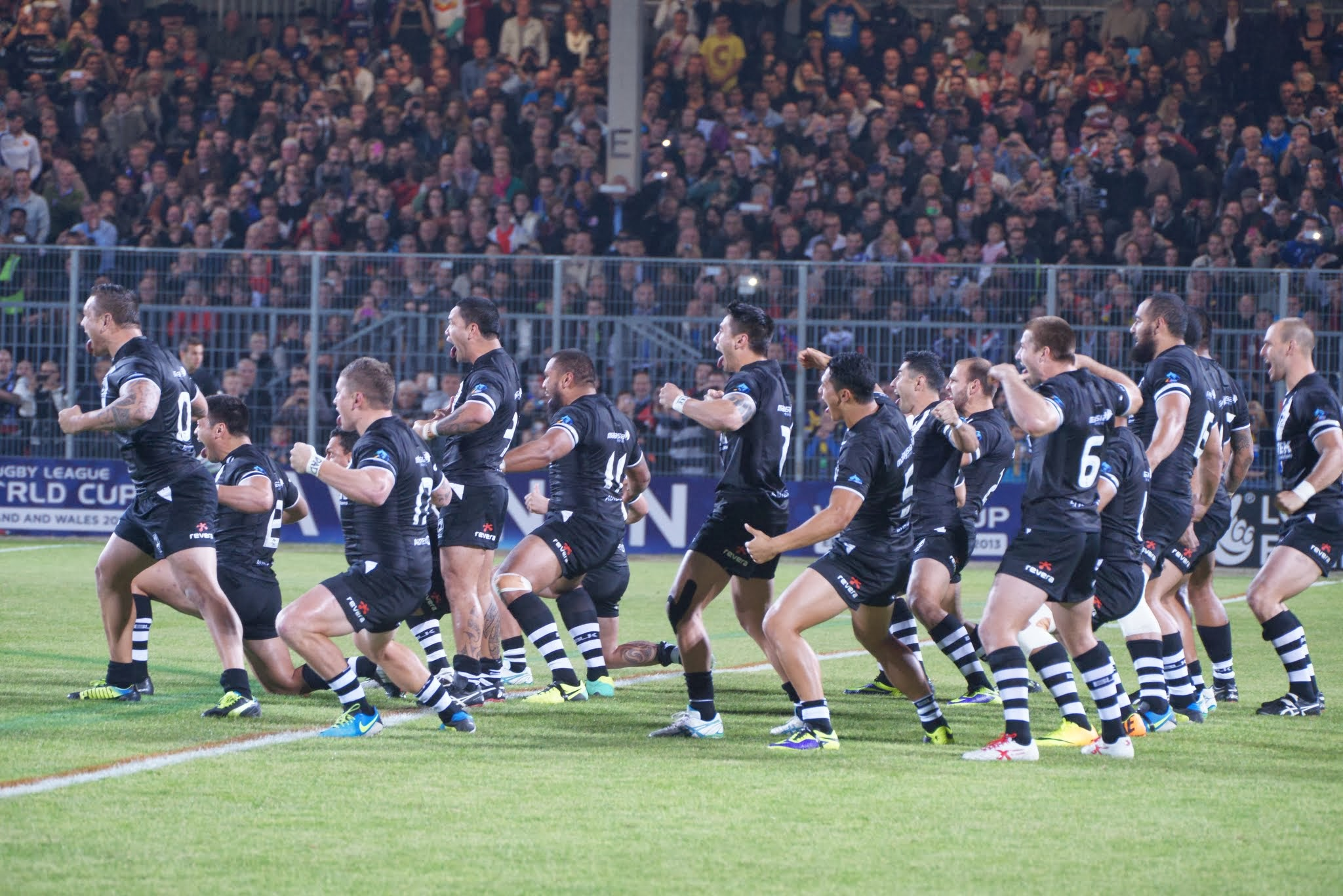

Touch Judges:
Grant Atkins (Australia)
Robert Hicks (England)
Video Referee:
Shayne Hayne (Australia)

== Papua New Guinea vs Samoa ==
4 November 2013
20:00

Papua New Guinea	4–38	Samoa
Try: Nandye 45' m Goal: Eliab (0/1)	Report	Try: Matagi 2' c A. Winterstein (3) 9' m, 25' c, 79' m Godinet 15' c Roberts 37' c Sue 61' c Goal: Milford (5/7) 2', 15', 25', 38', 61'

MS3 Craven Park, Hull
Attendance: 6,871
Referee: Shayne Hayne (Australia)
Player of the Match: Anthony Milford (Samoa)

FB	1	David Mead
RW	2	Josiah Abavu
RC	3	Menzie Yere
LC	4	Israel Eliab
LW	5	Nene MacDonald
SO	6	Dion Aiye
SH	7	Ray Thompson
PR	8	Mark Mexico
HK	9	Paul Aiton
PR	10	Larsen Marabe
SR	11	Jessie Joe Nandye
SR	12	Jason Chan
LF	13	Neville Costigan (c)
Substitutes
IC	14	Charlie Wabo
IC	15	Richard Kambo
IC	16	Jason Tali
IC	17	Enoch Maki
Coach:
(Papua New Guinea) Adrian Lam

FB	1	Anthony Milford
RW	2	Antonio Winterstein
RC	3	Tim Lafai
LC	4	Joseph Leilua
LW	5	Daniel Vidot
SO	6	Penani Manumeasili
SH	7	Ben Roberts
PR	8	David Fa’alogo
HK	9	Pita Godinet
PR	10	Suaia Matagi
SR	11	Iosia Soliola (c)
SR	12	Leeson Ah Mau
LF	13	Sauaso Sue
Substitutes
IC	14	Michael Sio
IC	15	Junior Moors
IC	16	Mark Taufua
IC	17	Mose Masoe
Coach:
(Australia) Matt Parish

Touch Judges:
George Stokes (England)
Chris Leatherbarrow (England)
Video Referee:
Ashley Klein (Australia)

== New Zealand vs Papua New Guinea ==
8 November 2013
20:00

New Zealand	56–10	Papua New Guinea
Try: Goodwin 4' c Tuivasa-Sheck (2) 7' c, 11' c Williams (3) 15' c, 27' c, 40' c Nu'uausala 30' m Whare (2) 50' c, 56' c Taylor 67' m Goal: Johnson (8/10) 4', 8', 12', 16', 28', 40', 51', 58'	Report	Try: Aiye 41' c Albert 78' m Goal: Paniu (1/2) 43'

Headingley Carnegie Stadium, Leeds
Attendance: 18,180
Referee: Ashley Klein (Australia)
Player of the Match: Sonny Bill Williams (New Zealand)

FB	1	Josh Hoffman
RW	2	Roger Tuivasa-Sheck
RC	3	Dean Whare
LC	4	Bryson Goodwin
LW	5	Manu Vatuvei
SO	6	Kieran Foran
SH	7	Shaun Johnson
PR	8	Ben Matulino
HK	9	Isaac Luke
PR	10	Jesse Bromwich
SR	11	Alex Glenn
SR	12	Sonny Bill Williams
LF	13	Elijah Taylor
Substitutes
IC	14	Sam Moa
IC	15	Sam Kasiano
IC	16	Frank-Paul Nu'uausala
IC	17	Thomas Leuluai
Coach:
(New Zealand) Stephen Kearney

FB	1	David Mead
RW	2	Josiah Abavu
RC	3	Menzie Yere
LC	4	Francis Paniu
LW	5	Nene MacDonald
SO	6	Ray Thompson
SH	7	Dion Aiye
PR	8	Neville Costigan
HK	9	Charlie Wabo
PR	10	Joe Bruno
SR	11	Jessie Joe Nandye
SR	12	Jason Chan
LF	13	Sebastian Pandia
Substitutes
IC	14	Wellington Albert
IC	15	Paul Aiton
IC	16	Jason Tali
IC	17	Mark Mexico
Coach:
(Papua New Guinea) Adrian Lam

Touch Judges:
Jose Pereira (France)
Robert Hicks (England)
Video Referee:
Richard Silverwood (England)

The 18,180 attendance was higher than all but one of Leeds Rhinos' home Super League attendances for 2013.

== France vs Samoa ==
11 November 2013
20:00

France	6–22	Samoa
Try: Escaré 32' c Goal: Bosc 33'	Report	Try: Vidot 4' c Milford 46' c Godinet 61' m Moors 74' c Goal: Milford (3/4) 4', 47', 75'

Stade Gilbert Brutus, Perpignan
Attendance: 11,576
Referee: Henry Perenara (New Zealand)
Player of the Match: Anthony Milford (Samoa)

FB	1	Morgan Escaré
RW	2	Frederic Vaccari
RC	3	Jean-Philippe Baile
LC	4	Vincent Duport
LW	5	Clint Greenshields
SO	6	Thomas Bosc
SH	7	William Barthau
PR	8	Jamal Fakir
HK	9	Éloi Pélissier
PR	10	Rémi Casty
SR	11	Kevin Larroyer
SR	12	Sébastien Raguin
LF	13	Gregory Mounis
Substitutes
IC	14	Tony Gigot
IC	15	Antoni Maria
IC	16	Benjamin Garcia
IC	17	Michael Simon
Coach:
(England) Richard Agar

FB	1	Anthony Milford
RW	2	Antonio Winterstein
RC	3	Tim Lafai
LC	4	Joseph Leilua
LW	5	Daniel Vidot
SO	6	Pita Godinet
SH	7	Ben Roberts
PR	8	David Fa’alogo
HK	9	Michael Sio
PR	10	Suaia Matagi
SR	11	Iosia Soliola (c)
SR	12	Leeson Ah Mau
LF	13	Sauaso Sue
Substitutes
IC	14	Tony Puletua
IC	15	Junior Moors
IC	16	Mark Taufua
IC	17	Mose Masoe
Coach:
(Australia) Matt Parish

Touch Judges:

Robert Hicks (England)
James Child (England)
Video Referee:
Shayne Hayne (Australia)
