= Stanley Tepend =

PNG international rugby league footballer & coach

Personal information
- Born: 15 May 1973 (age 53) Papua New Guinea

Playing information
- Position: Hooker
Representative
Years	Team	Pld	T	G	FG	P
2001	Papua New Guinea	3	1	0	0	4

Coaching information
Club
Years	Team	Gms	W	D	L	W%
2023	PNG Hunters	20	9	1	10	45
Representative
Years	Team	Gms	W	D	L	W%
2015	PNG PM's XIII	1	0	0	1	0
2017	PNG PM's XIII	1	0	0	1	0
2022	PNG PM's XIII	1	0	0	1	0
2022	Papua New Guinea	5	3	0	2	60
- Source: As of 25 Aug 2023

Stanley Tepend (born 15 May 1973) is a Papua New Guinean professional rugby league coach who was the former head coach of the PNG Hunters in the Hostplus Cup and formerly the national coach of the Papua New Guinea Kumuls.

== Playing career ==
Tepend played for the Enga Mioks in the PNG SP Inter-city cup national competition.

The Enga Mioks won the 2000 Digicel cup with Tepend starting at hooker in the win.

== Coaching career ==
Some of Tepend's earliest coaching roles were as an assistant for the PNG national side at the 2017 World Cup and a six time premiership winner as the foundation head coach of the Lae Snax Tigers in the PNG NRL Competition. He is currently the coach of the PNG Hunters in the Queensland Hostplus Cup.

In 2022 Tepend was appointed head coach of the 13-aside Papua New Guinea national rugby league team after Michael Marum left to pursue a career in politics. He is PNG's 13th National Coach and 5th former PNG Kumuls player after John Wagambie, Stanley Gene, Adrian Lam and Michael Marum to become coach of the Kumuls.

Sporting positions
Preceded by Matthew Church; 2020-22	Coach Papua New Guinea Hunters; 2023	Succeeded by
