= Garry Lo =

Papua New Guinean rugby league footballer

Personal information
- Born: 1 November 1993 (age 32) Mount Hagen, Papua New Guinea
- Height: 171 cm (5 ft 7 in)
- Weight: 98 kg (15 st 6 lb)

Playing information
- Position: Wing, Centre
Club
Years	Team	Pld	T	G	FG	P
2013	Port Moresby Vipers	16	13	0	0	50
2014–14	PNG Hunters	21	24	0	0	96
2016–17	Sheffield Eagles	46	50	0	0	200
2018	Castleford Tigers	1	1	0	0	4
2018(loan)	→ Sheffield Eagles	6	4	0	0	16
2019	AS Carcassonne	10	12	0	0	48
2019–	PNG Hunters	4	1	0	0	4
	Total	104	105	0	0	418
Representative
Years	Team	Pld	T	G	FG	P
2014	PNG Prime Minister's XIII	1	0	0	0	0
2014–17	Papua New Guinea	5	4	0	0	16
2019–	Papua New Guinea 9s	2	1	0	0	4
- Source: As of 9 November 2023

Garry Lo (born 1 November 1993) is a Papua New Guinean rugby league footballer who plays for the Waghi Tumbe in the Digicel Cup. Lo plays as a winger. He is also a Papua New Guinea international.

He represented Papua New Guinea in the 2017 Rugby League World Cup.

== Early years ==
Born in Mount Hagen, Papua New Guinea, Lo played junior rugby league in local rugby league clubs and then played for Gomis Panthers RLFC in Mount Hagen.

== Playing career ==
=== 2011 ===
Mount Hagen Eagles, a local rugby league club in the Digicel Cup, had him in a train and trial in the off-season and he eventually earned a spot in the wing and centres, he played with Mount Hagen Eagles for another season in 2012.

=== 2013 ===
Due to study commitments at the University of Papua New Guinea in Port Moresby, he left Mount Hagen Eagles and was signed by Port Moresby Vipers, where he played for the rest of the 2013 season in which Port Moresby Vipers won the 2013 Digicel Cup premiership.

=== PNG Hunters ===
In their début season in the Queensland Cup, a second tier competition in Australia, PNG Hunters selected Lo among other emerging players. He impressed the rugby league fans in Queensland, Australia and Papua New Guinea with his speed and power on the flanks and was dubbed as a try-scoring machine and 'mini Matt Utai'. In 2014, he was awarded the top try scorer award in the Queensland Cup for his season's total of 24 tries.

During the 2014 off-season, Garry left for Gateshead Thunder in England with his club-mate Jason Tali and Mark Mexico joining from NRL club Cronulla Sharks, which made the headlines in the local news. A controversial signing in which Stanley Gene was criticized for player grabbing.

But in a twist, he left England and came back to Papua New Guinea and apologized to the Hunters team for the wrong decision he made to leave them. However, the PNG Hunters made it very clear that there would be no fast return for the Kumuls winger, as he seeks to rejoin the team for the 2015 Queensland Cup

Lo then announced that he would join his original club, Mount Hagen Eagles in the Digicel Cup in 2015, where he was appointed captain.

Just before the Digicel Cup kick off, PNG Hunters Coach, Michael Marum, named Garry Lo in round 6 in an extended 21 player team to take on the inform Mackay Cutters, after poor performance and injuries to strike players for PNG Hunters.

=== Sheffield Eagles ===
Lo then brought his career back to England by joining Championship side Sheffield Eagles, again along with fellow countryman Mark Mexico. Here he became noticed for pitch-length runs, often resulting in a try. He scored more tries than games played with a 46/50 games/tries record. This resulted in 200 points scored for the Eagles in just two seasons.

=== Castleford Tigers ===
Lo signed a two-year deal with Super League side Castleford Tigers on 22 September 2017 with a deal with the Sheffield Eagles that is on loan. This gives both clubs the option of playing him when he doesn't play for his parent club. The Papua New Guinean scored on his Super League debut in a 28–12 defeat by Wigan. On 6 May 2018, Lo secured a mutual release from Castleford.

== International career ==
Garry Lo has played five times for Papua New Guinea, scoring four tries so far. He was named in the Papua New Guinea national team for the 2017 World Cup after an impressive season in England. His World Cup exploits were impressive too, as he scored twice against Ireland and England.

== Police Inquiry ==
In April 2018 Castleford stood down Lo as he 'voluntarily assisted a police inquiry', but neither the club nor West Yorkshire Police would disclose any further information.
