= Edene Gebbie =

Papua New Guinea international rugby league footballer

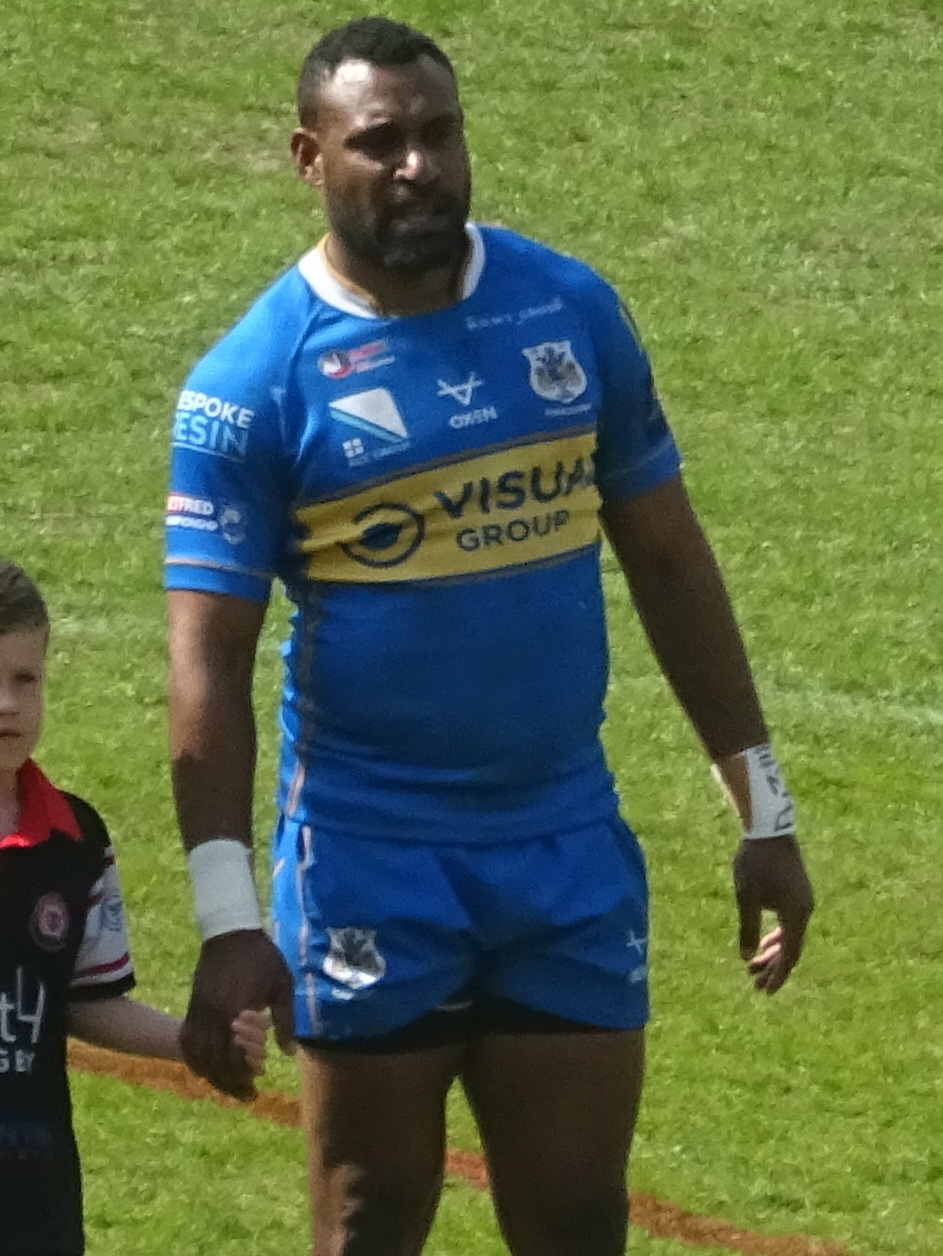

Personal information
- Full name: Edene Gebbie
- Born: 6 May 1995 (age 31) Sogeri, Papua New Guinea
- Height: 6 ft 1 in (1.85 m)
- Weight: 14 st 7 lb (92 kg)

Playing information
- Position: Fullback, Wing
Club
Years	Team	Pld	T	G	FG	P
2018	PNG Hunters	15	10	0	0	40
2019	Wynnum Manly Seagulls	22	18	0	0	72
2022	Townsville Blackhawks	3	1	0	0	4
2024	Whitehaven RLFC	18	10	0	0	40
2025–	Doncaster RLFC	23	25	0	0	100
	Total	81	64	0	0	256
Representative
Years	Team	Pld	T	G	FG	P
2019–	Papua New Guinea	3	1	0	0	4
2019	Papua New Guinea 9s	2	2	0	0	9
2018–22	PNG PM's XIII	2	0	0	0	0
- Source: As of 17 July 2025

Edene Gebbie (born 6 May 1995) is a Papua New Guinean professional rugby league footballer who plays as a fullback and winger for Doncaster RLFC in the Championship and Papua New Guinea at international level.

He previously played for Whitehaven in the Championship and Townsville Blackhawks, Wynnum Manly Seagulls and PNG Hunters in the Qld Cup.

== Background ==
Gebbie was born in Sogeri, Papua New Guinea.

== Career ==
Gebbie made his international debut for Papua New Guinea in their 24–6 defeat by Samoa in the 2019 Oceania Cup.

=== 2018 ===
In 2018, Gebbie was named rookie of the year for the Papua New Guinea Hunters. Gebbie finished with 10 tries from 15 games that season for the Hunters.

=== 2019 ===
In July 2019 the South Sydney Rabbitohs announced they had signed Gebbie for the 2020 and 2021 seasons. "Edene is an exciting prospect and we're looking forward to seeing him develop his skills over the next two years under the guidance of our coaching staff", Rabbitohs' football manager Shane Richardson said, "He has scored 19 tries in 29 games over the past two seasons with his sides winning 22 of those 29 games in which he played."

In September, Gebbie recorded 2 line-breaks and 169 run metres in Wynnum-Manly Seagulls' grand final defeat by the Burleigh Bears. In 21 games that year the 24-year-old fullback scored 19 tries, recorded 21 line breaks and 162 tackle breaks. He also averaged 208 running metres.

=== 2020 ===
Gebbie was released from the South Sydney Rabbitohs team due to COVID-19 reducing squad numbers to 32 players and he had to return to Papua New Guinea where he joined local club, Lae Snax Tigers where he was not given game time.

=== 2021 ===
Gebbie was named in the PNG Hunters 37-man train on squad to be based in Australia but had to withdraw.

In March 2021, it was announced that Gebbie was offered and accepted a Train and Trial contract with the Wests Tigers.

=== 2022 ===
Edene Gebbie joined the Townsville Blackhawks for the 2022 season. Gebbie was named in the PNG Kumuls 2021 Rugby League world cup squad but had to withdraw due to a groin injury.

=== 2023 ===
Gebbie joined the Port Moresby Vipers for the 2023 PNG Digicel Exxon Mobil cup season.

=== 2024 ===
Gebbie signs on with Whitehaven in the Championship joining fellow Papua New Guinean, Dion Aiye.

=== 2025 ===
Gebbie signs on with Doncaster for the 2025 season joining compatriots Watson Boas and Jason Tali.
