= Junior Rop =

PNG international rugby league footballer

Personal information
- Full name: Junior Rop
- Born: 31 July 1994 (age 30); Jiwaka Province, Papua New Guinea
- Height: 181 cm (5 ft 11 in)
- Weight: 101 kg (15 st 13 lb)

Playing information
- Position: Prop
Club
Years	Team	Pld	T	G	FG	P
2019–23	PNG Hunters	45	6	0	0	24
Representative
Years	Team	Pld	T	G	FG	P
2016–23	PNG Prime Minister's XIII	1	0	0	0	0
2023–	Papua New Guinea	2	0	0	0	4
- Source: As of 10 November 2023

Junior Rop is a Papua New Guinean professional rugby league footballer who plays as a prop for the PNG Hunters in the QLD Cup and Papua New Guinea at international level.

== Career ==
Rop made his international debut for Papua New Guinea in their 46–10 victory over Cook Islands in the 2023 Pacific Test.
