= Michael Marum =

PNG international rugby league coach and politician

Michael Marum MP
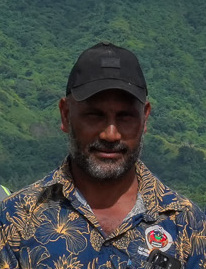
- Marum in 2025

Governor of East New Britain
- Incumbent
- Assumed office 30 May 2022
- Preceded by: Nakikus Konga

Personal details
- Born: 8 October 1973 (age 53) Papua New Guinea
- Rugby league career

Playing information
- Position: Hooker
Club
Years	Team	Pld	T	G	FG	P
	Port Moresby Vipers
	Rabaul Gurias
	Total	0	0	0	0	0
Representative
Years	Team	Pld	T	G	FG	P
2000–01	Papua New Guinea	4	1	0	0	4
2005	PNG Prime Minister's XIII	1	0	0	0	0

Coaching information
Club
Years	Team	Gms	W	D	L	W%
2014–19	PNG Hunters	144	83	6	55	58
Representative
Years	Team	Gms	W	D	L	W%
2014	PNG PM's XIII	1	0	0	1	0
2016	PNG PM's XIII	1	0	0	1	0
2018	PNG PM's XIII	1	0	0	1	0
2016–21	Papua New Guinea	10	7	0	3	70
- Source: As of 9 November 2023

Michael Marum (born 8 October 1973) is a Papua New Guinean rugby league coach and politician who was the first head coach of the Port Moresby-based PNG Hunters in the Queensland Cup and the Papua New Guinea national team. During his playing career, Marum represented Papua New Guinea at the 2000 World Cup. He is the nephew of Skerry Palanga, who coached Papua New Guinea in the 1980s and 1990s.

== Playing career ==
Marum played for the Port Moresby Vipers and then went on to captain, the Agmark Rabaul Guria's and played four tests for Papua New Guinea, including one at the 2000 World Cup.

== Coaching career ==
Some of Marum's earliest coaching roles were as an assistant for the PNG national side at the 2008 World Cup and 2010 Four Nations. His first head coach role was with the Agmark Gurias in the PNG domestic competition in 2012.

Marum has also served as the competition director to the local Agmark nines tournament.

He coached Papua New Guinea rugby league nines side at the 2015 Pacific Games.

In 2016 Marum was appointed head coach of the 13-aside Papua New Guinea national rugby league team after Mal Meninga left to coach Australia. He is PNG's 12th National Coach and 4th former PNG Kumuls player after John Wagambie, Stanley Gene, Adrian Lam to become coach of the Kumuls.

== Political career ==
At the 2022 General Election, Marum was elected governor and MP for the province of East New Britain.

Sporting positions
Preceded by	Coach Papua New Guinea Hunters; 2014-2019	Succeeded by Matthew Church
