= Brandy Peter =

PNG international rugby league footballer

Personal information
- Born: 4 September 1991 (age 34) Pangia, Southern Highlands Province, Papua New Guinea

Playing information
- Position: Prop, Second-row, Lock
Club
Years	Team	Pld	T	G	FG	P
2015–17	PNG Hunters	50	4	0	0	16
Representative
Years	Team	Pld	T	G	FG	P
2014–16	PNG Prime Minister's XIII	2	0	0	0	0
2014–16	Papua New Guinea	3	0	0	0	0
- As of 10 November 2023

Brandy Peter is a Papua New Guinean professional rugby league footballer who plays for the PNG Hunters team in the Queensland Cup and has represented Papua New Guinea.
