= PNG Prime Minister's XIII =

PNG representative rugby league team

Papua New Guinea Prime Minister's XIII
Team information
- Governing body: PNGRFL
- Head coach: Jason Demetriou
- Captain: Nene Macdonald
- Most caps: Rodney Pora (8)
- Top try-scorer: Nickson Kolo; Jessie Joe Nandye; Menzie Yere (3)
- Top point-scorer: Glen Nami (16)

Uniforms
First colours

Team results
- First international
- PNG PM's XIII 0–34 (Australia) Australian PM's XIII (Lloyd Robson Oval, Port Moresby, Papua New Guinea; 18 September 2005)
- Biggest defeat
- PNG PM's XIII 0–58 (Australia) Australian PM's XIII (National Football Stadium, Port Moresby, Papua New Guinea; 24 September 2016)

Papua New Guinea Prime Minister's XIII, or sometimes informally referred to as the PNG PM's XIII, is the name of a representative rugby league team, comprising Papua New Guinean players from the Papua New Guinea National Rugby League, PNG Hunters and other overseas clubs. The team is selected to play an annual fixture against Australian Prime Minister's XIII in Papua New Guinea in the final weeks of the rugby league season.

== History ==
The PNG Prime Minister's XIII first played against their Australian counterparts in 2005 at Lloyd Robson Oval in the Papua New Guinean capital, Port Moresby. The team was coached in that match by former national team head coach Bob Bennett. The side has also been coached by former Papua New Guinean internationals Adrian Lam and Stanley Gene and is currently coached by Michael Marum, who played for the team in 2005.

Originally played in Port Moresby, in recent years the games have been held in various locations around Papua New Guinea, including Lae and Kokopo. Unlike regular international matches, each team is allowed a five-man bench and given unlimited interchanges throughout the match.

Originally, the team was made up of players predominantly from the local Papua New Guinea National Rugby League competition. In recent years, players from the National Rugby League, Intrust Super Cup and English Championship have also been selected.

The match is also used to promote rugby league, as well as humanitarian causes such as HIV and AIDS awareness, among the Papua New Guinean community.

The PNG PM's XIII has never won a match against Australia since the annual fixture commenced, but managed a 24–24 draw in 2007, after trailing 20–0 at half time. In 2019, the PNG PM's XIII did not play the Australian side, who instead faced the Fiji Prime Minister's XIII.

== Current squad ==
=== Men ===
The team for the match on 3 October 2025 was initially announced on social media on 6 October 2025. The NRL later posted the team.

Tallies in the table include the 2026 match.

J#	Player	Age	Position(s)	PM's XIII					Tests	Club	Club Matches				Other Reps
J#	Player	Age	Position(s)	M	T	G	F	P	Tests	Club	2026	NRL	NQC	PNG26	Other Reps
1	Sanny Wabo	27	Fullback	3	0	0	0	0	0	Hunters	16	0	64	0
2	Chris Benjamin	—	Wing	1	0	0	0	0	0	ENB Agmark Gurias	20	0	0	20
3	Jayden Nuampo	—	Centre	1	0	0	0	0	0	Kandes RLC	20	0	0	20
4	Stanford Talita	30	Centre	2	1	0	0	4	0	Clydesdales	19	0	46	0
5	Bruce Bawase	—	Wing	1	0	0	0	0	0	Hunters	18	0	18	0
6	Victor Ario	—	Five-eighth	1	0	0	0	0	0	Mendi Muruks	11	0	0	11
7	Francis Sam	—	Halfback	1	0	0	0	0	0	Mendi Muruks	19	0	0	19
8	Jordan Pat	28	Prop	2	0	0	0	0	0	Mt Hagen Eagles	16	0	56	16
9	Emmanuel Alfred	—	Hooker	1	0	0	0	0	0	ENB Agmark Gurias	18	0	0	18
10	Xavier Turi	—	Prop	1	0	0	0	0	0	Hela Wigmen		0	0	Yes
11	Murray Connors	—	Second-row	2	0	0	0	0	0	Hunters	19	0	40	0
12	Jacob Taulani	22	Second-row	2	0	0	0	0	0	Knights	19	0	23	0
13	Ila Alu	31	Lock	4	0	0	0	0	3	Hunters	19	0	125	0
14	Stenza Tandoa	—	Hooker	1	0	0	0	0	0	Kandes RLC	13	0	0	13
15	Koso Bandi	26	Prop	2	0	0	0	0	3	Hunters	6	0	35	0
16	Doa Tapako	—	Second-row	1	0	0	0	0	0	Mendi Muruks	18	0	0	18
17	Sylvester Namo	26	Prop	4	1	0	0	4	9	Hunters	8	0	56	0
18	Lote Kuman	—	Five-eighth	1	0	0	0	0	0	Hela Wigmen	17	0	0	17
19	Mondokai Waim	—	Second-row	1	0	0	0	0	0	Enga Mioks	17	0	0	17
20	Jeremiah Ben	—	Fullback	1	1	1	0	6	0	Port Moresby Vipers	19	0	0	19

Notes:

- The shading in the Clubs column of the above table indicates players selected from teams outside the 2026 NRL season
  - Second Tier
    - Papua New Guinea Hunters (6): Alu, Bandi, Bawase, Connors, Namo, Wabo
    - Western Clydesdales (1): Talita.
  - Third Tier
    - ENB Agmark Gurias (2): Alfred, Benjamin.
    - Hela Wigmen (2): Kuman, Turi.
    - Kandes RLC (2): Nuampo, Tandoa.
    - Mendi Muruks (3): Ario, Sam, Tapako.
    - Mt Hagen Eagles (1): Pat.
    - Port Moresby Vipers (1): Ben.

=== Women ===
The team for the match on 3 October 2026 was announced on social media on 24 September 2026. The NRL later posted the team.

Tallies in the table include the 2026 match.

J#	Player	Age	Position(s)	PM's XIII					Test Matches	Club	Other Reps
J#	Player	Age	Position(s)	M	T	G	F	P	Test Matches	Club	Other Reps
1	Anika Butler	26	Fullback	2	4	0	0	0	0	Maitland Pickers
2	Ivania Wong	—	Wing	1	0	0	0	0	0	ACT Brumbies (Union)
3	Joyce Hobert	—	Centre	1	0	0	0	0	0	Port Moresby Vipers
4	Ruth Gende	—	Centre, Second-row	2	2	0	0	0	0	Port Moresby Vipers
5	Jacinta Gerry	—	Wing, Centre	1	0	0	0	0	0	Mt Hagen Eagles
6	Gemma Schnaubelt	28	Five-eighth, Wing	1	0	0	1	0	2	Clydesdales
7	Ua Ravu	29	Halfback, Wing	3	9	1	0	0	4	Rabbitohs
8	Jenny David	—	Prop	1	0	0	0	0	0	Tigers
9	Josephine Howard	—	Hooker, Prop	2	0	1	0	0	4	Central Dabaris
10	Gian Kaupa	—	Prop	1	0	0	0	0	0	Lae Tigers
11	Doreen William	—	Second-row	1	0	0	0	0	0	Lae Tigers
12	Belinda Gwasamun	—	Second-row, Centre	4	12	0	0	0	0	Mt Hagen Eagles
13	Jafinda Sap	—	Lock	1	0	0	0	0	0	Central Dabaris
14	Lilah Malabag	—	Halfback	4	7	0	0	0	0	Port Moresby Vipers
15	Cynthiah Peters	—	Halfback	1	0	0	0	0	0	ENB Gurias
16	Mala Mark	—	Fullback, Wing	5	3	0	0	0	0	Central Dabaris
17	Alice Alois	—	Wing	1	0	0	0	0	0	Port Moresby Vipers
18	Mya Muller	—	Prop, Lock	1	1	0	0	0	0	Panthers
19	Sareka Mooka	26	Prop	1	0	0	0	0	0	Cutters
20	Sherinda Philip	—	Centre	1	0	0	0	0	0	Central Dabaris

== Results ==
=== 2005 ===
18 September 2005

PNG PM's XIII (Papua New Guinea)	0 – 34	(Australia) Australian PM's XIII
	Report	Tries; 2 Ryan Cross; 1 Braith Anasta; 1 Brett Finch; 1 Kurt Gidley; 1 Luke Priddis; Goals; 1 Clinton Schifcofske; 1 Kurt Gidley; 1 Luke Ricketson

Lloyd Robson Oval, Port Moresby
Attendance: 9,000
Referee: Shayne Hayne (Australia)

PNG Prime Minister's XIII
2005 squad		Coaching staff
1 Jessie Joe Nandye – FB; 2 Eki Ene – WG; 3 Chris Purkikil – CE; 4 Leroy Muriki – CE; 5 Ganet Auwo – WG; 6 Keith Peters – FE; 7 Stanley Hondina – HB; 8 Rodney Pora – PR; 9 Charlie Wabo – HK; 10 Trevor Exton – PR; 11 Joe Omai – SR; 12 Francis Ray – SR; 13 Johnson Kuike – LK	14 Jessie Alunga – SR; 15 Channel Aquila – SR; 16 Aaron Mulunga – SR; 17 Simon Tonge – SR; 17 Michael Marum – HK	Head coach: Bob Bennett; Legend: (c) Captain(s); (vc) Vice-captain(s)

=== 2006 ===
30 September 2006

PNG PM's XIII (Papua New Guinea)	8 – 28	(Australia) Australian PM's XIII
Tries; Tom O'Reilly 2	Report	Tries; 2 Jarryd Hayne; 1 Nathan Merritt; 1 Steve Price; 1 Brett Stewart; 1 Trent Waterhouse; Goals; 2 Matt Orford

Lloyd Robson Oval, Port Moresby
Referee: Bill Harrigan (Australia)

PNG Prime Minister's XIII
2006 squad		Coaching staff
1 Ompalua Kua – FB; 2 Tu'u Maori – WG; 3 Francis Ray – CE; 4 Gimapau Keimalo – CE; 5 Eki Ene – WG; 6 Keith Peters (c) – FE; 7 Geno Kima – HB; 8 Rodney Pora – PR; 9 Paul Aiton – HK; 10 Trevor Exton – PR; 11 George Moni – SR; 12 Johnson Kuike – SR; 13 Tom O'Reilly – LK	14 Porian Bal – SR; 15 Channel Aquila – SR; 16 Wesley Benny – SR; 17 Alphonse Kapil – SR	Head coach: Adrian Lam; Legend: (c) Captain(s); (vc) Vice-captain(s)

=== 2007 ===
23 September 2007

PNG PM's XIII (Papua New Guinea)	24 – 24	(Australia) Australian PM's XIII
Tries; Nigel Hukula 1 Jessie Joe Nandye 1 Keith Peters 1 Menzie Yere 1 Goals; Gimapau Keimelo 4	Report	Tries; 2 Chris Lawrence; 2 Joel Monaghan; 1 Luke Douglas; Goals; 2 Kurt Gidley

Lloyd Robson Oval, Port Moresby
Attendance: 16,000
Referee: Gavin Badger (Australia)

PNG Prime Minister's XIII
2007 squad		Coaching staff
1 Menzie Yere – FB; 2 Tu'u Maori – WG; 3 Eki Ene – CE; 4 Gimapau Keimelo – CE; 5 Michael Mark – WG; 6 Jessie Joe Nandye – FE; 7 Keith Peters (c) – HB; 8 Rodney Pora – PR; 9 Charlie Wabo – HK; 10 Nigel Hukula – PR; 11 George Moni – SR; 12 Joe Omai – SR; 13 Johnson Kuike – LK	14 Paul Aiton – SR; 15 Nico Slain – SR; 16 Porian Bal – SR; 17 Francis Ray – SR; 18 Nickson Kolo – SR	Head coach: Adrian Lam; Legend: (c) Captain(s); (vc) Vice-captain(s)

=== 2008 ===
28 September 2008

PNG PM's XIII (Papua New Guinea)	30 – 54	(Australia) Australian PM's XIII
Tries; Stanley Gene 2 Menzie Yere 2 Nickson Kolo 1 Junior Ropra 1 Goals; Tu'u Maori 3	Report	Tries; 2 Jarryd Hayne; 2 Chris Lawrence; 1 Robbie Farah; 1 Nathan Hindmarsh; 1 Michael Jennings; 1 Josh Morris; 1 Joe Picker; 1 Carl Webb; Goals; 6 Scott Prince; 1 Terry Campese

Lloyd Robson Oval, Port Moresby
Attendance: 10,000
Referee: Bernard Sutton (Australia)

PNG Prime Minister's XIII
2008 squad		Coaching staff
1 Menzie Yere – FB; 2 Dominic Angra – WG; 3 Tu'u Maori – CE; 4 Larsen Marabe – CE; 5 Michael Mark – WG; 6 Jessie Joe Nandye – FE; 7 Keith Peters – HB; 8 Nickson Kolo – PR; 9 Charlie Wabo – HK; 10 Rodney Pora – PR; 11 Joseph Omae – SR; 12 Francis Ray – SR; 13 Stanley Gene (c) – LK	14 Rod Griffin – SR; 15 Junior Ropra – SR; 16 Simon Young – SR; 17 Opisa Pomba – SR; 18 Paul Aiton – SR	Head coach: Adrian Lam; Legend: (c) Captain(s); (vc) Vice-captain(s)

=== 2009 ===
27 September 2009

PNG PM's XIII (Papua New Guinea)	18 – 42	(Australia) Australian PM's XIII
Tries; Tommy Butterfield 1 Seigfried Gande 1 Jessie Joe Nandye 1 Goals; Glen Nami 3/3	Report	Tries; 3 Michael Jennings; 1 George Rose; 1 Matthew Scott; 1 David Shillington; 1 Glenn Stewart; Goals; 7/7 Johnathan Thurston

Lloyd Robson Oval, Port Moresby
Attendance: 10,000
Referee: Brett Suttor (Australia)

PNG Prime Minister's XIII
2009 squad		Coaching staff
1 Jessie Joe Nandye – FB; 2 Elijah Riyong – WG; 3 Anton Kui – CE; 4 Larsen Marabe – CE; 5 Kevin Frank – WG; 6 Dion Aiye – FE; 7 Keith Peters (c) – HB; 8 Rodney Pora – PR; 9 Benjamin John – HK; 10 Nickson Kolo – PR; 11 George Moni – SR; 12 Seigfried Gande – SR; 13 Rod Griffin – LK	14 Simon Young – SR; 15 Glen Nami – SR; 16 Tom Butterfiled – SR; 17 Kerry Tapako – SR; 18 Tyson Martin – SR	Head coach: Adrian Lam; Legend: (c) Captain(s); (vc) Vice-captain(s)

=== 2010 ===
26 September 2010

PNG PM's XIII (Papua New Guinea)	18 – 30	(Australia) Australian PM's XIII
Tries; Nickson Kolo 2 Glen Nami 1 Goals; Ryan Tongia 3	Report	Tries; 1 Luke Douglas; 1 Chris Sandow; 1 Ben Smith; 1 Kade Snowden; 1 Willie Tonga; 1 Akuila Uate; Goals; 2 Corey Parker; 1 James Maloney

Lloyd Robson Oval, Port Moresby
Attendance: 10,856
Referee: Tony De Las Heras (Australia)

PNG Prime Minister's XIII
2010 squad		Coaching staff
1 Ryan Tongia – FB; 2 Michael Mark – WG; 3 Jessie Joe Nandye – CE; 4 Larsen Marabe – CE; 5 Elijah Riyong – WG; 6 Dion Aiye – FE; 7 Benjamin John – HB; 8 George Moni – PR; 9 Paul Aiton (c) – HK; 10 Rodney Pora – PR; 11 Rod Griffin – SR; 12 Seigfried Gande – SR; 13 Glen Nami – LK	14 Charlie Wabo – SR; 15 Tony Dai – SR; 16 Andrew Sam – SR; 17 Pidi Tongap – SR; 18 Desmond Mok – SR; 19 Johnson Kuike – SR; 20 Joseph Pombo – SR; 21 Nickson Kolo – SR	Head coach: Stanley Gene; Legend: (c) Captain(s); (vc) Vice-captain(s)

=== 2011 ===
25 September 2011

PNG PM's XIII (Papua New Guinea)	22 – 36	(Australia) Australian PM's XIII
Tries; Josiah Abavu 1 Dion Aiye 1 Jessie Joe Nandye 1 Ray Thompson 1 Goals; Glen Nami 3	Report	Tries; 2 Blake Ferguson; 2 Josh Morris; 1 Luke Burt; 1 Nathan Merritt; Goals; 3 Luke Burt; 1 Matthew Bowen; 1 Michael Crocker; 1 Nathan Hindmarsh

Sir Ignatius Kilage Stadium, Lae
Attendance: 16,528
Referee: Adam Devcich (Australia)

PNG Prime Minister's XIII
2011 squad		Coaching staff
1 David Mead – FB; 2 Elijah Riyong – WG; 3 Richard Kambo – CE; 4 Chris Hogi – CE; 5 Albert Patak – WG; 6 Dion Aiye – FE; 7 Ray Thompson – HB; 8 Gonzela Urakusu – PR; 9 James Segeyaro – HK; 10 Rodney Pora – PR; 11 Glen Nami – SR; 12 David Loko – SR; 13 Paul Aiton (c) – LK	14 Jessie Joe Nandye – SR; 15 Larsen Marabe – SR; 16 Pidi Tongap – SR; 17 Charlie Wabo – SR; 18 Josiah Abavu – SR; 19 Samuel Sok – SR	Head coach: Adrian Lam; Legend: (c) Captain(s); (vc) Vice-captain(s)

=== 2012 ===
23 September 2012

PNG PM's XIII (Papua New Guinea)	18 – 24	(Australia) Australian PM's XIII
Tries; Richard Kambo 1 David Loko 1 Albert Patak 1 Matthew Puke 1 Goals; Israel Eliab 1/4	Report	Tries; 1 Michael Jennings; 1 Feleti Mateo; 1 Beau Ryan; 1 Akuila Uate; Goals; 4/4 Scott Prince

Lloyd Robson Oval, Port Moresby
Attendance: 16,000
Referee: Phil Haines (Australia)

PNG Prime Minister's XIII
2012 squad		Coaching staff
1 Josiah Abavu – FB; 2 Matthew Puke – WG; 3 Richard Kambo – CE; 4 Jason Tali – CE; 5 Albert Patak – WG; 6 Dion Aiye – FE; 7 Israel Eliab – HB; 8 Rodney Pora – PR; 9 Charlie Wabo – HK; 10 Gonzela Urakusu – PR; 11 David Loko – SR; 12 Larsen Marabe – SR; 13 Glen Nami – LK	14 Wesley Mohukule – SR; 15 Mark Mexico – SR; 16 Enock Maki – SR; 17 Wartovo Puara – SR; 18 Esau Siune – SR	Head coach: Adrian Lam; Legend: (c) Captain(s); (vc) Vice-captain(s)

=== 2013 ===
29 September 2013

PNG PM's XIII (Papua New Guinea)	10 – 50	(Australia) Australian PM's XIII
Tries; Josiah Abavu 1 Israel Eliab 1 Goals; Sebastian Pandia 1	Report	Tries; 2 Jarryd Hayne; 1 Kevin Gordon; 1 Brett Morris; 1 Josh Papalii; 1 Aidan Sezer; 1 David Shillington; 1 James Tamou; 1 Brent Tate; Goals; 6 Aidan Sezer; 1 Corey Parker

Kalabond Oval, Kokopo
Attendance: 7,000
Referee: Gavin Morris (Australia)

PNG Prime Minister's XIII
2013 squad		Coaching staff
1 Josiah Abavu – FB; 2 Francis Paniu – WG; 3 Jessie Joe Nandye – CE; 4 Israel Eliab – CE; 5 Nene Macdonald – WG; 6 Ase Boas – FE; 7 Roger Laka – HB; 8 Enock Maki – PR; 9 Charlie Wabo (c) – HK; 10 Petero Sunivalu – PR; 11 Sebastian Pandia – SR; 12 Paul Aiton – SR; 13 Larsen Marabe – LK	14 Mark Mexico – SR; 15 Joe Bruno – SR; 16 David Loko – SR; 17 Richard Kambo – SR; 18 James Segeyaro – SR; 19 Adex Wera – SR; 20 Jason Tali – SR; 21 Wellington Albert – SR	Head coach: Adrian Lam; Legend: (c) Captain(s); (vc) Vice-captain(s)

=== 2014 ===
12 October 2014

PNG PM's XIII (Papua New Guinea)	16 – 34	(Australia) Australian PM's XIII
Tries; Thompson Teteh 2 Israel Eliab 1 Goals; Noel Zeming 2	Report	Tries; 2 Aaron Woods; 1 Will Chambers; 1 Josh Mansour; 1 Anthony Milford; 1 Beau Scott; Goals; 3 Ben Hunt; 2 Matt Moylan

Kalabond Oval, Kokopo
Attendance: 7,000
Referee: Grant Atkins (Australia)

PNG Prime Minister's XIII
2014 squad		Coaching staff
1 Israel Eliab (c) – FB; 2 Garry Lo – WG; 3 Thompson Teteh – CE; 4 Jason Tali – CE; 5 Adex Wera – WG; 6 Dion Aiye – FE; 7 Roger Laka – HB; 8 Mark Mexico – PR; 9 Wartovo Puara – HK; 10 Esau Siune – PR; 11 Sebastian Pandia – SR; 12 Rhyse Martin – SR; 13 Adam Korave – LK	14 Noel Zeming – SR; 15 Willie Minoga – SR; 16 Timothy Lomai – SR; 17 Lawrence Tu'u – SR; 18 Brandy Peter – SR; 19 Stanton Albert – SR; 20 Kato Ottio – SR; 21 Henry Noki – SR	Head coach: Michael Marum Mal Meninga; Legend: (c) Captain(s); (vc) Vice-captain(s)

=== 2015 ===
26 September 2015

PNG PM's XIII (Papua New Guinea)	12 – 40	(Australia) Australian PM's XIII
Tries; Watson Boas 1 Justin Olam 1 Goals; Alfred Missian 2	Report	Tries; 2 David Nofoaluma; 1 Euan Aitken; 1 Jarrod Croker; 1 Alex Johnston; 1 Jeremy Latimore; 1 Chris McQueen; 1 Jack Wighton; Goals; 2 Jarrod Croker; 2 Adam Reynolds

Sir John Guise Stadium, Port Moresby
Attendance: 18,113
Referee: Gavin Reynolds (Australia)

PNG Prime Minister's XIII
2015 squad		Coaching staff
1 Albert Patak (c) – FB; 2 Justin Olam – WG; 3 Enock Siane – CE; 4 Junior Rau – CE; 5 Philemon Kimisive – WG; 6 Chris Jerry – FE; 7 Watson Boas – HB; 8 Sebastian Pandia – PR; 9 Noel Joel – HK; 10 Sydney Fred – PR; 11 David Loko – SR; 12 Rhadley Brawa – SR; 13 Sami Maniai – LK	14 Alfred Missian – FE; 15 Benjamin Hetra – SR; 16 Isaac Mel – SR; 17 Moses Meninga – SR; 18 Andrew Ipi – SR; 19 Daniel Pai – SR; 20 Richard Kambo – SR	Head coach: Stanley Tepend; Legend: (c) Captain(s); (vc) Vice-captain(s)

=== 2016 ===
24 September 2016

PNG PM's XIII (Papua New Guinea)	0 – 58	(Australia) Australian PM's XIII
	Report	Tries: 3 Mitchell Moses; 2 Josh Dugan; 2 Blake Ferguson; 2 Greg Inglis; 1 Moses Mbye; 1 Semi Radradra; Goals: 4 Matt Moylan; 3 Mitchell Moses

National Football Stadium, Port Moresby
Attendance: 15,011
Referee: David Munro (Australia)

PNG Prime Minister's XIII
2016 squad		Coaching staff
1 Bland Abavu – FB; 2 Butler Morris – WG; 3 Justin Olam – CE; 4 Konnie Barnard – CE; 5 Anderson Benford – WG; 6 Ase Boas (c) – FE; 7 Mafu Kalas – HB; 8 Bernard Goma – PR; 9 Noel Joel – HK; 10 Esau Siune – PR; 11 David Loko – SR; 12 Rhadley Brawa – SR; 13 Junior Rop – LK	14 Wartovo Puara – SR; 15 Brandy Peter – SR; 16 Willie Minoga – SR; 17 Ila Alu – SR; 18 Kingston Paul – SR	Head coach: Michael Marum; Legend: (c) Captain(s); (vc) Vice-captain(s)

=== 2017 ===
23 September 2017

PNG PM's XIII (Papua New Guinea)	8 – 48	(Australia) Australian PM's XIII
Tries: Stanford Talita 1 Goals: Jason Missian 2/2	Report	Tries: 3 Tom Trbojevic; 3 James Tedesco; 1 Tyson Frizell; 1 James Maloney; Goals: 6/6 James Maloney; 1/1 Andrew Fifita; 1/1 Valentine Holmes

National Football Stadium, Port Moresby
Attendance: 13,468

PNG Prime Minister's XIII
2017 squad		Coaching staff
1 Joe Joshua – FB; 2 Brendon Gotuno – WG; 3 Stanford Talita – CE; 4 Junior Rau – CE; 5 Karo Kauna Jr – WG; 6 Jason Missian – FE; 7 Charlie Simon (c) – HB; 8 Junior Rop – PR; 9 Stanley Olo – HK; 10 Dilbert Isaac – PR; 11 Tuvi Lepan – SR; 12 Eddie Dafa – SR; 13 John Andy – LK	14 Sailas Gahuna – SR; 15 William Mone – SR; 17 Muka Peter Kulu – SR; 18 Joshua Nane – SR	Head coach: Stanley Tepend; Legend: (c) Captain(s); (vc) Vice-captain(s)

=== 2018 ===
6 October 2018

Papua New Guinea	18 – 34	Australian PM's XIII
Tries: Kyle Laybutt 1 Rhyse Martin 1 Justin Olam 1 Goals: Rhyse Martin 3/3	1st: 6 – 24; 2nd: 12 – 10; Report	Tries: 2 Daly Cherry-Evans; 1 Corey Allan; 1 Nick Cotric; 1 Chad Townsend; 1 Jake Trbojevic; Goals: 5/6 Zac Lomax

National Football Stadium, Port Moresby
Attendance: 14,007
Referee: Chris Sutton (Australia)

PNG Prime Minister's XIII
2018 squad		Coaching staff
1 David Mead (c) – FB; 2 Edene Gebbie – WG; 3 Justin Olam – CE; 4 Nene Macdonald – CE; 5 Daniel Russell – WG; 6 Lachlan Lam – FE; 7 Watson Boas – HB; 8 Moses Meninga – PR; 9 James Segeyaro – HK; 10 Stanton Albert – PR; 11 Rhyse Martin – SR; 12 Nixon Putt – SR; 13 Wellington Albert – LK	14 Tom Butterfield – HK; 15 Enoch Maki – PR; 16 Kyle Laybutt – HB; 17 Willie Minoga – PR; 18 Rhadley Brawa – SR	Head coach: Michael Marum; Legend: (c) Captain(s); (vc) Vice-captain(s)

=== 2022 ===
25 September 2022

Australia	64 - 14	PNG PM's XIII
Tries: Matt Burton (22', 64') 2 Selwyn Cobbo (29', 79') 2 Nat Butcher (2') 1 Josh Addo-Carr (9') 1 Angus Crichton (12') 1 Zac Lomax (14') 1 Jake Averillo (33') 1 Sam Walker (69') 1 Dane Laurie (72') 1 Beau Fermor (74') 1 Goals: Zac Lomax 8/11 (3', 11', 13', 15', 24', 71', 73', 75'); Josh Addo-Carr 0/1	1st: 38 – 4; 2nd: 26 – 10	Tries: Edene Gebbie 1 Jimmy Ngutlik 1 Brandon Nima 1 Goals: Kyle Laybutt 1/3

Suncorp Stadium, Brisbane
Attendance: 8,744
Referee: Todd Smith (Australia)

PNG Prime Minister's XIII
2022 squad		Coaching staff
1 Edene Gebbie – FB; 2 Jimmy Ngutlik – WG; 3 Brandon Nima – CE; 4 Rodrick Tai – CE; 5 Leon Undupia – WG; 6 Judah Rimbu – FE; 7 Kyle Laybutt – HB; 8 Mckenzie Yei – PR; 9 Wartovo Puara – HK; 10 Sylvester Namo – PR; 11 Daniel Russell – SR; 12 Nixon Putt – SR; 13 Keven Appo – LK	14 Wesser Tenza – HK; 15 Emmanuel Waine – LK; 16 Zev John – PR; 17 Francis Kembis – PR; 18 Cruise Ten – SR; 19 Sherwin Tanabi – SR; 20 Epel Kapinias – PR	Head coach: Stanley Tepend; Legend: (c) Captain(s); (vc) Vice-captain(s); Updated: 20 September 2022; Source(s): https://www.nrl.com/news/2022/09/20/png-name-pms-xiii-squad/

=== 2023 ===
23 September 2023

PNG PM's XIII (Papua New Guinea)	18 – 30	(Australia) Australian PM's XIII
Tries: Nene Macdonald 4 Cruise Ten 46; Epel Kapinias 70; Goals: Zac Laybutt 3/3	1st: 6–12; 2nd: 18–30	Tries: Murray Taulagi 15; Hudson Young 33; Alofiana Khan-Pereira 58; Cameron McInnes 61; Tyrell Sloan 79; Goals: Zac Lomax 5/5

Santos Stadium, Port Moresby
Referee: Peter Gough (Australia)

PNG Prime Minister's XIII
2023 squad		Coaching staff
1 Treigh Stewart – FB; 2 Robert Derby – WG; 3 Benji Kot – CE; 4 Zac Laybutt – CE; 5 Nene Macdonald – WG; 6 Gary James – FE; 7 Kyle Laybutt – HB; 8 Epel Kapinias – PR; 9 Judah Rimbu – HK; 10 Valentine Richard – PR; 11 Nixon Putt – SR; 12 Jeremiah Simbiken – SR; 13 Cruise Ten – LK	14 Morea Morea – FB; 15 Junior Rop – PR; 16 Tommy Moide – PR; 17 Seal Kalo – PR; 18 Joseph Mocke – HK; 19 Jamie Mavoko – HB; 20 Nathan Tente – HK	Head coach: Justin Holbrook; Legend: (c) Captain(s); (vc) Vice-captain(s)

== Players ==
=== Captains ===
- Keith Peters (2006–2007, 2009)
- Stanley Gene (2008)
- Paul Aiton (2010–2011)
- Charlie Wabo (2013)
- Israel Eliab (2014)
- Albert Patak (2015)
- Ase Boas (2016)
- Charlie Simon (2017)
- David Mead (2018)
- Wartovo Puara (2022)
- Kyle Laybutt (2023)
- Judah Rimbu (2024)
- Nene Macdonald (2025)

== Coaches ==
- Bob Bennett (2005)
- Adrian Lam (2006–2009, 2011–2013)
- Stanley Gene (2010)
- Michael Marum (2014, 2016, 2018)
- Mal Meninga (2014)
- Stanley Tepend (2015, 2017, 2022)
- Justin Holbrook (2023)
- Jason Demetriou (2024–2025)

== Records ==
=== Individual ===
- Most games
  - 8 Rodney Pora (2005–2012)
  - 7 Paul Aiton (2006–2008, 2010–2011, 2013)
  - 7 Jessie Joe Nandye (2005, 2007–2011, 2013)
  - 7 Charlie Wabo (2005, 2007–2008, 2010–2013)
  - 6 Larsen Marabe (2008–2013)
- Most tries
  - 3 Nickson Kolo
  - 3 Jessie Joe Nandye
  - 3 Menzie Yere
- Most points
  - 16 Glen Nami
  - 12 Nickson Kolo
  - 12 Jessie Joe Nandye
  - 12 Menzie Yere
- Most tries in a match
  - 2 Tom O'Reilly (2006)
  - 2 Stanley Gene (2008)
  - 2 Menzie Yere (2008)
  - 2 Nickson Kolo (2010)
  - 2 Thompson Teteh (2014)
- Most points in a match
  - 10 Rhyse Martin (2018)

== See also ==
- Papua New Guinea national rugby league team
