= Nixon Putt =

Papua New Guinea international rugby league footballer

Personal information
- Born: 3 March 1996 (age 30) Kumkui Village, Mount Hagen, Papua New Guinea
- Height: 1.79 m (5 ft 10 in)
- Weight: 96 kg (15 st 2 lb)

Playing information
- Position: Second-row, Lock, Centre
Club
Years	Team	Pld	T	G	FG	P
2017–18	PNG Hunters	46	5	0	0	20
2019–20	Norths Devils	21	8	0	0	32
2021–23	Central Queensland Capras	57	14	0	0	56
2024	Castleford Tigers	7	0	0	0	0
2024(DR)	→ Newcastle Thunder	1	0	0	0	0
2024(DR)	→ Batley Bulldogs	6	0	0	0	0
2025–2026	Central Queensland Capras	14	4	0	0	16
2027	PNG Hunters	0	0	0	0	0
2028–	PNG Chiefs	0	0	0	0	0
	Total	152	31	0	0	124
Representative
Years	Team	Pld	T	G	FG	P
2017–	Papua New Guinea	17	6	0	0	24
2019	Papua New Guinea 9s	3	1	0	0	4
2018–25	PNG Prime Minister's XIII	4	0	0	0	0
- As of 13 November 2026

Nixon Putt (born 3 March 1996) is a Papua New Guinean semi-professional rugby league footballer who plays as a second-row forward for the Central Queensland Capras in the Queensland Cup and Papua New Guinea at international level.

Putt has previously played first-grade rugby league for the Castleford Tigers in the Super League, and spent time on dual registration at Batley Bulldogs in the RFL Championship and Newcastle Thunder in League 1. He has also played for the PNG Hunters and Norths Devils in the Queensland Cup

== Background ==
Putt was born in Mount Hagen, Papua New Guinea.

== Playing career ==
=== 2017 ===
Putt made his international debut for Papua New Guinea against the Cook Islands on 7 May 2017, in the Pacific Test at Campbelltown Sports Stadium, Sydney.

=== 2018 ===
In 2018, at the end-of-year PNG Hunters awards presentation, he was awarded the Stan Joyce medal for the Player of the Year award. In the same year, he was signed by the Norths Devils for the 2019 Intrust Super Cup competition.

=== 2019 ===
Putt played in every game and was awarded the best forward for the Norths Devils in the end of year club awards presentation. He was also selected to represent Papua New Guinea Kumuls for the inaugural Rugby League World Cup 9s to be hosted in Sydney, Australia.

=== 2022 ===
In the final group stage game at the 2021 Rugby League World Cup, Putt scored two tries for Papua New Guinea in the 36–0 victory over Wales.

=== 2023 ===
On 29 September 2023, the Castleford Tigers announced the signing of Putt on a two-year deal from the 2024 Super League season. He described the move as a "dream come true"; "I'm really keen to introduce myself to the Cas fans. I'll play my footy, and my footy will tell the fans how I play, and get their support."

=== 2024 ===
Putt was assigned squad number 17 ahead of the 2024 season. He made his Super League debut for Castleford in round 1 against the Wigan Warriors.

=== 2025 ===
On 12 October 2025 he played for the PNG Prime Minister's XIII in the 28-10 defeat to Australia’s Prime Minister's XIII in Port Moresby
