= Matthew Church (rugby league) =

Australian RL coach

Personal information
- Full name: Matthew Church
- Born: 2 February 1977 (age 49) Brisbane, Queensland, Australia

Coaching information
Club
Years	Team	Gms	W	D	L	W%
2020–22	PNG Hunters	37	14	1	22	38
2023	Brisbane Tigers	23	17	1	5	74
	Total	60	31	2	27	52
- Source: As of 25 September 2023

Matthew Church (born 2 February 1977) is an Australian professional rugby league football coach who is the head coach of the Brisbane Tigers in the Queensland Cup.

== Coaching career ==
In November 2019, Church was appointed as head coach of the PNG Hunters. On 15 October 2021, it was announced that Church was reappointed for another year as head coach of the PNG Hunters.

In August 2022, the Brisbane Tigers announced that Church had signed a two-year contract as the head coach of their Hostplus Cup team.

Sporting positions
Preceded by Michael Marum; 2014-2019	Coach Papua New Guinea Hunters	Succeeded by Stanley Tepend; 2023-
