= Keith Peters (rugby league) =

PNG international rugby league footballer

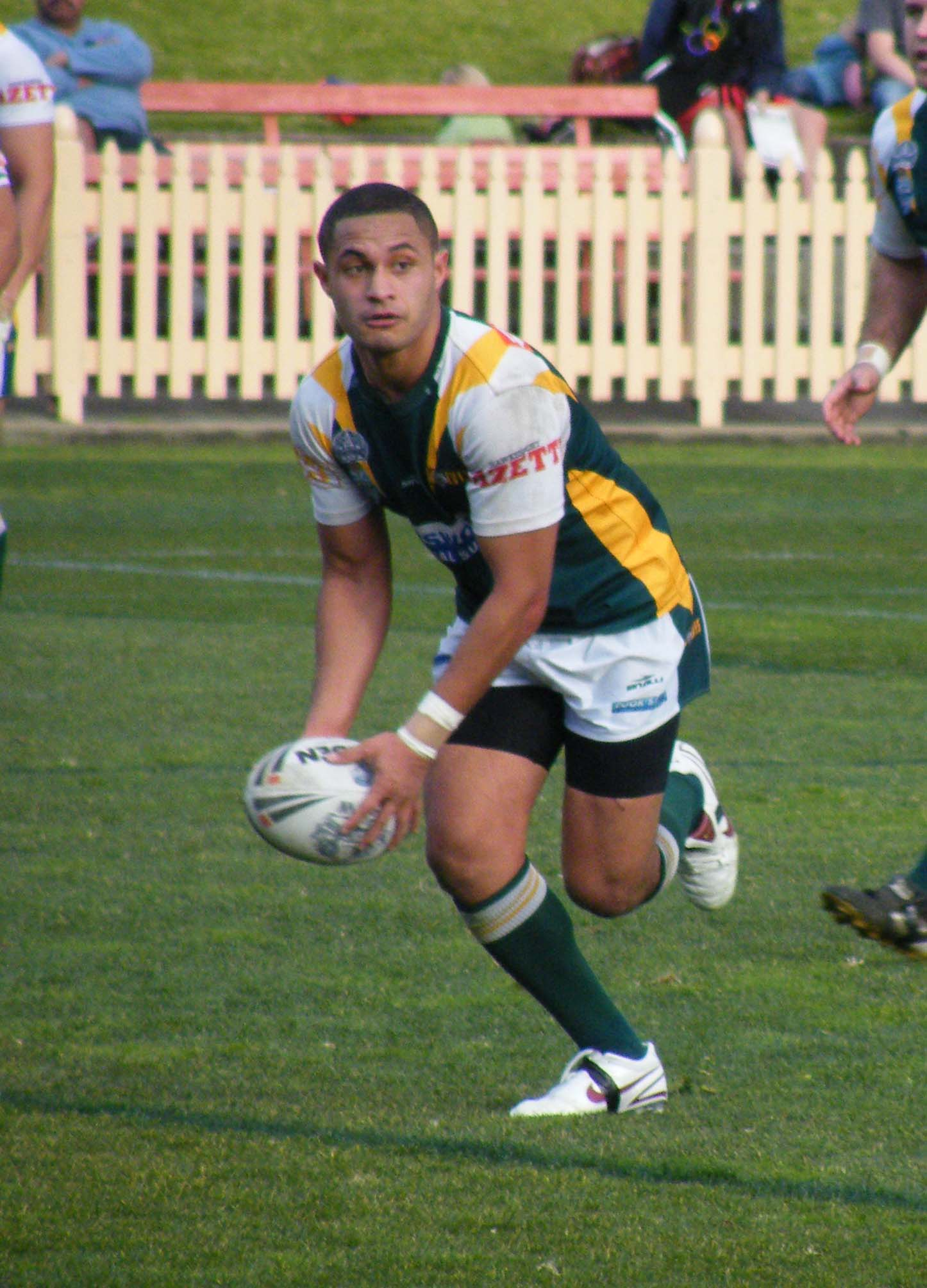

Personal information
- Full name: Keith Peters
- Born: 25 May 1986 (age 39); Port Moresby, Papua New Guinea
- Height: 1.78 m (5 ft 10 in)
- Weight: 89 kg (14 st 0 lb)

Playing information
- Position: Hooker, Halfback
Club
Years	Team	Pld	T	G	FG	P
2006–09	Penrith Panthers	10	1	0	0	4
Representative
Years	Team	Pld	T	G	FG	P
2005–09	PNG Prime Minister's XIII	5	1	0	0	4
2007–09	Papua New Guinea	8	1	0	0	4
- As of 9 November 2023

Keith Peters (born 25 January 1986) is a Papua New Guinean former professional rugby league footballer who played for the Penrith Panthers in the NRL. Peters had also captained Papua New Guinea at international level.

Peters moved from Papua New Guinea to Australia in 1993 aged 7 and played his junior rugby league for Cambridge Park. He attended Patrician Brothers College Blacktown until 2004. He has played several games for the Penrith Panthers, but in 2009 spent most of his time with their feeder club Windsor.

Peters was named in the Papua New Guinea training squad for the 2008 Rugby League World Cup.

Peters was named in the PNG squad for the 2008 Rugby League World Cup. Peters was named as part of the Papua New Guinea squad for the 2009 Pacific Cup.
