= Ila Alu =

PNG international rugby league footballer

Personal information
- Full name: Ila Alu
- Born: 14 April 1995 (age 31) Port Moresby, Papua New Guinea
- Height: 168 cm (5 ft 6 in)
- Weight: 98 kg (15 st 6 lb)

Playing information
- Position: Lock
Club
Years	Team	Pld	T	G	FG	P
2018–	PNG Hunters	101	4	0	0	16
Representative
Years	Team	Pld	T	G	FG	P
2016–26	PNG Prime Minister's XIII	4	0	0	0	0
2024–	Papua New Guinea	1	0	0	0	0
- Source: As of 3 October 2026

Ila Alu is a Papua New Guinean professional rugby league footballer. He plays as a lock for the PNG Hunters in the QLD Cup and Papua New Guinea at international level.

== Career ==
Alu made his international debut for Papua New Guinea in their 22–10 victory over Fiji Bati in the 2024 Pacific Test.

On 12 October 2025 he played for the PNG Prime Minister's XIII in the 28-10 defeat to Australia’s Prime Minister's XIII in Port Moresby

=== 2026 ===
He captained the PNG Prime Minister's XIII on 3 October 2026 in the 10-60 defeat to Prime Minister's XIII in Port Moresby.
