= Nico Slain =

PNG international rugby league footballer

Personal information
- Full name: Nico Slain
- Born: 19 April 1983 (age 43)

Playing information
- Position: Prop
Club
Years	Team	Pld	T	G	FG	P
2009–10	Hunslet Hawks	16	4	0	0	16
Representative
Years	Team	Pld	T	G	FG	P
2007	PNG Prime Minister's XIII	1	0	0	0	0
2007–08	Papua New Guinea	2	0	0	0	0
- As of 25 May 2026

Nico Slain is a former international rugby league footballer who represented Papua New Guinea at the 2008 Rugby League World Cup. Slain is a prop by preference and played domestically in the English Championship 1 for Hunslet Hawks, after previously playing for the Goroka Lahanis in his native Papua New Guinea.

He made one appearance for the Kumuls in their 2008 World Cup campaign in a 46–6 defeat by Australia at the Dairy Farmers Stadium.
