= Israel Eliab =

PNG international rugby league footballer

Izzy Eliab
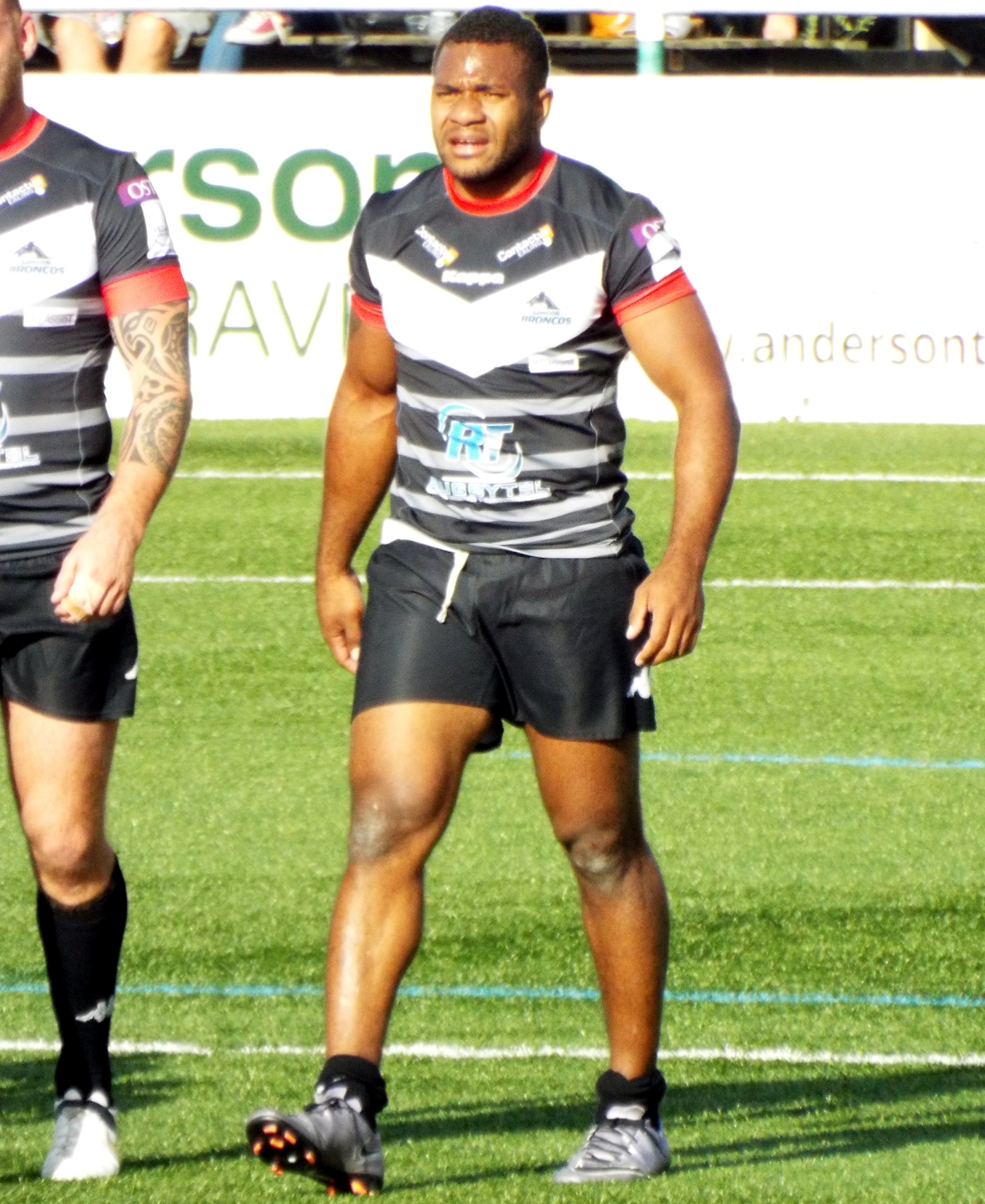

Personal information
- Full name: Israel Eliab
- Born: 16 January 1991 (age 35) Kokopo, East New Britain, Papua New Guinea
- Height: 178 cm (5 ft 10 in)
- Weight: 93 kg (14 st 9 lb)

Playing information
- Position: Five-eighth, Centre
Club
Years	Team	Pld	T	G	FG	P
2011	Rabaul Gurias	15	2	0	1	9
2012–13	Port Moresby Vipers	35	5	0	2	22
2014–15	PNG Hunters	44	29	0	2	60
2016	London Broncos	8	3	0	0	12
2016(loan)	→ London Skolars	6	4	0	0	16
2017–	PNG Hunters	6	1	0	0	4
	Total	114	44	0	5	123
Representative
Years	Team	Pld	T	G	FG	P
2012–14	PNG Prime Minister's XIII	3	2	1	0	10
2013–17	Papua New Guinea	5	0	0	0	0
- Source: As of 9 November 2023
Medals
Men's rugby league nines
Representing Papua New Guinea
Pacific Games
Gold medal – first place	2015 Port Moresby	Team

Israel Eliab (born 16 January 1991) is a Papua New Guinea professional rugby league footballer who played for the PNG Hunters in the Queensland Cup. A Papua New Guinea international, most notably at the 2013 World Cup.

Eliab previously played for the London Broncos in the Championship.

== Background ==
Eliab was born and raised in the small town of Kokopo in the East New Britain Province of Papua New Guinea. He comes from a mixed parentage of East New Britain and Manus.

== Playing career ==
He started off playing in the domestic competition (Digicel Cup) in PNG for the Rabaul Gurias. Israel previously played for the Port Moresby Vipers with whom he won a premiership title in 2013. He then played for the Papua New Guinea Hunters in the Queensland Intrust Super Cup competition, for which he is also the captain. His position is at five-eighth, but has also played at halfback and centre as well.

Eliab captained PNG's rugby league nines side at the 2015 Pacific Games. He captained the 13-aside team in the 2015 Melanesian Cup.

Eliab spent the 2016 season with the London Broncos in the Championship. He has also spent part of 2016 on loan at the London Skolars.
