= Menzie Yere =

PNG international rugby league footballer

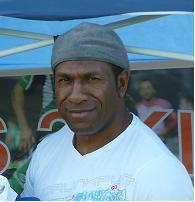

Personal information
- Full name: Emmanuel Yere
- Born: 24 October 1983 (age 43) Simbu Province, Papua New Guinea
- Height: 5 ft 8 in (173 cm)
- Weight: 13 st 1 lb (83 kg)

Playing information
- Position: Centre
Club
Years	Team	Pld	T	G	FG	P
2009–20	Sheffield Eagles	293	195	0	0	780
2019(loan)	→Doncaster	11	5	0	0	20
2021	Sheffield Hawks	0	0	0	0	0
	Total	304	200	0	0	800
Representative
Years	Team	Pld	T	G	FG	P
2007–08	PNG Prime Minister's XIII	2	3	0	0	12
2008–13	Papua New Guinea	15	9	0	0	36
- Source: As of 9 November 2023

Emmanuel Menzie Yere (born 24 October 1983) is a Papua New Guinean professional rugby league footballer who plays for the Sheffield Eagles whom he played with in the 2000s and 2010s. He was a Papua New Guinea international. He is also Sheffield Eagles' all-time leading try scorer with 195 tries in 292 games.

== Club career ==
Yere was signed by Sheffield Eagles in 2008 following some impressive performances for Papua New Guinea at the Rugby League World Cup.

Yere is often known as "The Jukebox" because he has so many hits, referring to the large number of heavy tackles he made.

In 2013, he scored a club record 46 tries in one season, comfortably beating the previous record of 35 tries set by Quentin Laulu-Togagae a year earlier. He also surpassed Daryl Powell's career total of 114 tries, making him the club's highest all-time try scorer. In April 2017 Menzie became one of few players to have played 250 games for the Eagles, by taking to the field in an 18-42 League victory over Rochdale Hornets.

At the beginning of 2018, it became apparent Yere would have trouble starting the season for the Eagles. 'Visa issues' meant he could not be part of the playing squad until Gameweek 14. Subsequently, he missed the first half of the regular season. However, Yere's visa was finally cleared in May 2018 thus ending his longest spell without playing in his career.

On 2019 he re-signed for Sheffield and was immediately loaned out to Doncaster where he scored a debut try in their victory over Batley Bulldogs in the Challenge Cup on April 14, 2019.

== Personal life ==
Yere has three sons with his wife Sandy.

In 2010, his club discovered that Yere had been buying kit (particularly boots) and taking unwanted kit to send back to his home country, where kit shortage is a problem. With Yere's support they set up Kits2Kids, a charity that collects kit from companies, clubs, schools and individuals and ships it to PNG.

After his final season with the Eagles it became apparent that Yere was going to struggle to gain British citizenship based on the cost of application. Therefore, the Sheffield Eagles' Supporters Trust began a campaign to raise the sufficient funds for the Yere's to stay in the country. They managed to raise £5,000 in five days.

In April 2019 he was granted permission to reside in the UK and re-signed for the Sheffield Eagles.

== Representative career ==
Yere played for PNG in the 2008 Rugby League World Cup, where he scored one try against Australia.

Yere was named as part of the Papua New Guinea squad for the 2009 Pacific Cup. Papua New Guinea won the tournament with Yere scoring two tries in each the semi-final and the final.

He played for Papua New Guinea in the 2010 Four Nations tournament scoring two tries, taking his total representative tries to 9, the most for any PNG player.

Yere was selected by coach Adrian Lam as part of the train-on squad for the 2013 Rugby League World Cup.
