= Benji Kot =

PNG international rugby league footballer

Personal information
- Full name: Benji Kot
- Born: 2 October 1997 (age 27); Mount Hagen, Papua New Guinea
- Height: 175 cm (5 ft 9 in)
- Weight: 97 kg (15 st 4 lb)

Playing information
- Position: Centre, Second-row
Club
Years	Team	Pld	T	G	FG	P
2021–	PNG Hunters	41	19	0	0	76
Representative
Years	Team	Pld	T	G	FG	P
2022	PNG Prime Minister's XIII	1	0	0	0	0
2023–	Papua New Guinea	1	0	0	0	0
- Source: As of 10 November 2023

Benji Kot is a Papua New Guinean professional rugby league footballer who plays as a centre, second-row for the PNG Hunters in the QLD Cup and Papua New Guinea at international level.

== Career ==
Kot made his international debut for Papua New Guinea in their 46–10 victory over Cook Islands in the 2023 Pacific Test.
