= Joe Bruno (rugby league) =

PNG international rugby league footballer

Personal information
- Born: 25 May 1985 (age 39); Papua New Guinea

Playing information
- Position: Prop
Club
| Years | Team | Pld | T | G | FG | P |
|---|---|---|---|---|---|---|
| ?– | PNG Hunters | ? | ? | ? | ? | ? |
Representative
| Years | Team | Pld | T | G | FG | P |
| 2013 | PNG Prime Minister's XIII | 1 | 0 | 0 | 0 | 0 |
| 2013 | Papua New Guinea | 1 | 0 | 0 | 0 | 0 |
- Source: Joe Bruno rugbyleagueproject.org As of 9 November 2023

Joe Bruno is a Papua New Guinean rugby league footballer who represented Papua New Guinea national rugby league team in the 2013 World Cup.

== Playing career ==
A former Rabaul Gurias prop in the semi professional digicel cup, he was a foundation player with the PNG Hunters and is now part of the PNG Hunters coaching staff who compete in the Intrust super Cup. His position is at prop.
