= Seigfried Gande =

PNG international rugby league footballer

Personal information
- Born: Papua New Guinea

Playing information
- Position: Second-row
Club
Years	Team	Pld	T	G	FG	P
	Goroka Lahanis
Representative
Years	Team	Pld	T	G	FG	P
2009	Papua New Guinea	2	0	0	0	0
2009–10	PNG Prime Minister's XIII	2	1	0	0	4
- Source: As of 9 November 2023

Seigfried Gande is a Papua New Guinean rugby league international. His position is Second-row.

== Playing career ==
A Goroka Lahanis player in the Papua New Guinea National Rugby League, Gande was first selected for Papua New Guinea in 2009. He played against the Prime Minister's XIII and in two matches at the 2009 Pacific Cup. He was selected for the 2010 Four Nations, but withdrew due to injury.

In 2014, Gande was still competing for Goroka, before retiring to work for the Papua New Guinea Rugby Football League as a development officer.
