= Rodney Pora =

PNG international rugby league footballer

Personal information
- Born: 2 February 1981 (age 45)

Playing information
- Position: Prop
Club
Years	Team	Pld	T	G	FG	P
2013	Whitehaven RLFC	8	1	0	0	4
Representative
Years	Team	Pld	T	G	FG	P
2005–12	PNG Prime Minister's XIII	8	0	0	0	0
2007–09	Papua New Guinea	6	0	0	0	0

Rodney Pora (born 2 February 1981) is a professional rugby league footballer who played in the 2000s and 2010s. He played for Agmark Gurias in Papua New Guinea. He is a Papua New Guinea international.

He has been named in the Papua New Guinea training squad for the 2008 Rugby League World Cup.

He was named in the PNG squad for the 2008 Rugby League World Cup.

Pora was named as part of the Papua New Guinea squad for the 2009 Pacific Cup.
