= Tu'u Maori =

PNG international rugby league footballer (1988–2022)

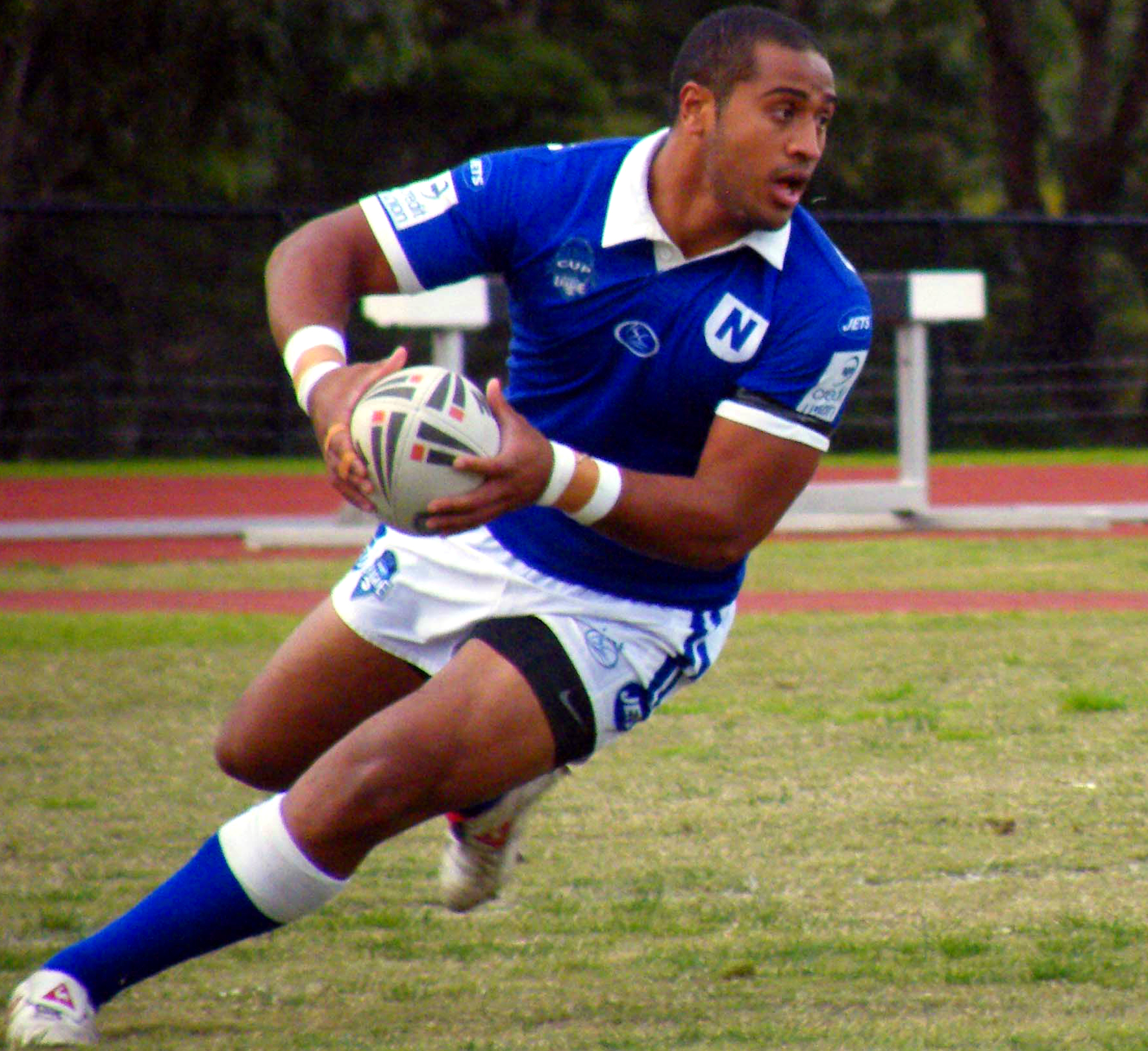
- Tu'u Maori in June 2009

Personal information
- Full name: Tu'u Maori
- Born: 22 November 1988 Auckland, New Zealand
- Died: 3 January 2022 (aged 33) Ipswich, Queensland, Australia

Playing information
- Height: 1.85 m (6 ft 1 in)
- Weight: 94 kg (14 st 11 lb)
- Position: Wing, Centre, Fullback, Five-eighth
Representative
Years	Team	Pld	T	G	FG	P
2006–08	PNG Prime Minister's XIII	3	0	3	0	6
2008	Papua New Guinea	3	0	0	0	0
- Source: As of 9 November 2023

Tu'u Maori (22 November 1988 – 3 January 2022) was a Papua New Guinea international rugby league footballer who played as a winger or centre. He played in the Australian National Youth Championship (Toyota Cup) for the Cronulla Sharks and Sydney Roosters.

== Playing career ==
Maori was named in the Papua New Guinea training squad for the 2008 Rugby League World Cup. He was then named in the PNG squad for the 2008 Rugby League World Cup.

Maori was part of the 2007 Papua New Guinea Tour of Wales and France. He played against Wales on the wing at the Brewery Field, Bridgend, Wales. He represented the Sydney Roosters in the Toyota Cup in 2008. Maori also played for the Newtown Jets, the Roosters' feeder club in the NSWRL Cup competition, in 2009. He was named as part of the Papua New Guinea squad for the 2009 Pacific Cup.

He would be part of the Melbourne Storm trial squad ahead of the 2011 NRL season, scoring a try in the club's trial match against the Canberra Raiders in Bega. He played for the Cronulla Sharks in the 2011 NSW Cup.

== Personal life and death ==
Maori died from motor neurone disease at his home in Ipswich, Queensland, on 3 January 2022, at the age of 33.
