= Tom O'Reilly (rugby league) =

PNG international rugby league footballer

Personal information
- Full name: Tom O'Reilly
- Born: 23 November 1974 (age 51) Papua New Guinea

Playing information
- Position: Centre, Five-eighth, Hooker, Lock
Club
Years	Team	Pld	T	G	FG	P
1997–98	Gold Coast Chargers	34	7	0	0	28
2000	Oldham	9	1	0	0	4
2001–02	Warrington Wolves	16	2	0	0	8
2003	Sheffield Eagles	15	10	0	0	40
	Bramley Buffaloes
2004	Pia Donkeys	3	0	0	0	0
	Total	77	20	0	0	80
Representative
Years	Team	Pld	T	G	FG	P
1996	Papua New Guinea NRL	1	0	0	0	0
1997	Rest of the World	1	0	0	0	0
2000–01	Papua New Guinea	6	0	0	0	0
2006	PNG Prime Minister's XIII	1	2	0	0	8
- Source: As of 9 November 2023

Tom O'Reilly is a Papua New Guinean former professional rugby league footballer who represented Papua New Guinea in the 2000 World Cup.

== Playing career ==
O'Reilly played for the Redcliffe Dolphins in the Brisbane Rugby League, and was part of their first premiership since 1965 when they defeated the Wests Panthers in the 1994 grand final. He also represented the Queensland Residents.

O'Reilly played for the Gold Coast Chargers in 1997 and 1998, playing in 34 matches including the club's final game in first grade which was a 20-18 loss against Cronulla.

In 2000, O'Reilly transferred to Oldham in England. After the 2000 World Cup he had trials with the Salford City Reds. He joined Warrington Wolves in September 2001, after a trial there. He also played for the Bramley Buffaloes, and the Sheffield Eagles.

O'Reilly then transferred to the Pia Donkeys in France, scoring a try in the 2003 Lord Derby Cup Final and playing in the 2004 Challenge Cup.

== Representative career ==
O'Reilly made his representative début during the Super League war, playing in two "test matches" against Australia. Only the Australian Rugby League recognises the matches as tests, and not the International Rugby League Board or any other organisation. In 1996 O'Reilly played for a rebel Papua New Guinea National Rugby League competition selection and in 1997 he was selected for the Rest of the World side.

In 2000, O'Reilly made his début for Papua New Guinea, against Australia in a warm up match for the 2000 World Cup. He was selected for the tournament and played in all four matches for Papua New Guinea. His last match for PNG came in 2001, again against Australia.
