= Larsen Marape =

PNG international rugby league footballer

Larsen Marabe
Personal information
- Born: 9 September 1986 (age 39) Papua New Guinea
- Height: 178 cm (5 ft 10 in)
- Weight: 89 kg (14 st 0 lb)

Playing information
Club
| Years | Team | Pld | T | G | FG | P |
|---|---|---|---|---|---|---|
| 2010 | Featherstone Rovers | 2 | 3 | 0 | 0 | 12 |
| 2014 | Whitehaven RLFC | 11 | 2 | 0 | 0 | 8 |
| | Total | 13 | 5 | 0 | 0 | 20 |
Representative
| Years | Team | Pld | T | G | FG | P |
| 2008–13 | PNG Prime Minister's XIII | 6 | 0 | 0 | 0 | 0 |
| 2010–13 | Papua New Guinea | 3 | 0 | 0 | 0 | 0 |
- Source: As of 25 May 2026

Larsen Marabe (misspelled Marabe; born 9 September 1986) is a Papua New Guinean rugby league footballer who plays for the Rabaul Gurias. He was a member of the Kumuls' squads for the 2010 Four Nations and 2013 World Cup.

In 2012 he played in New South Wales.
