= Josiah Abavu =

PNG international rugby league footballer (1986–2024)

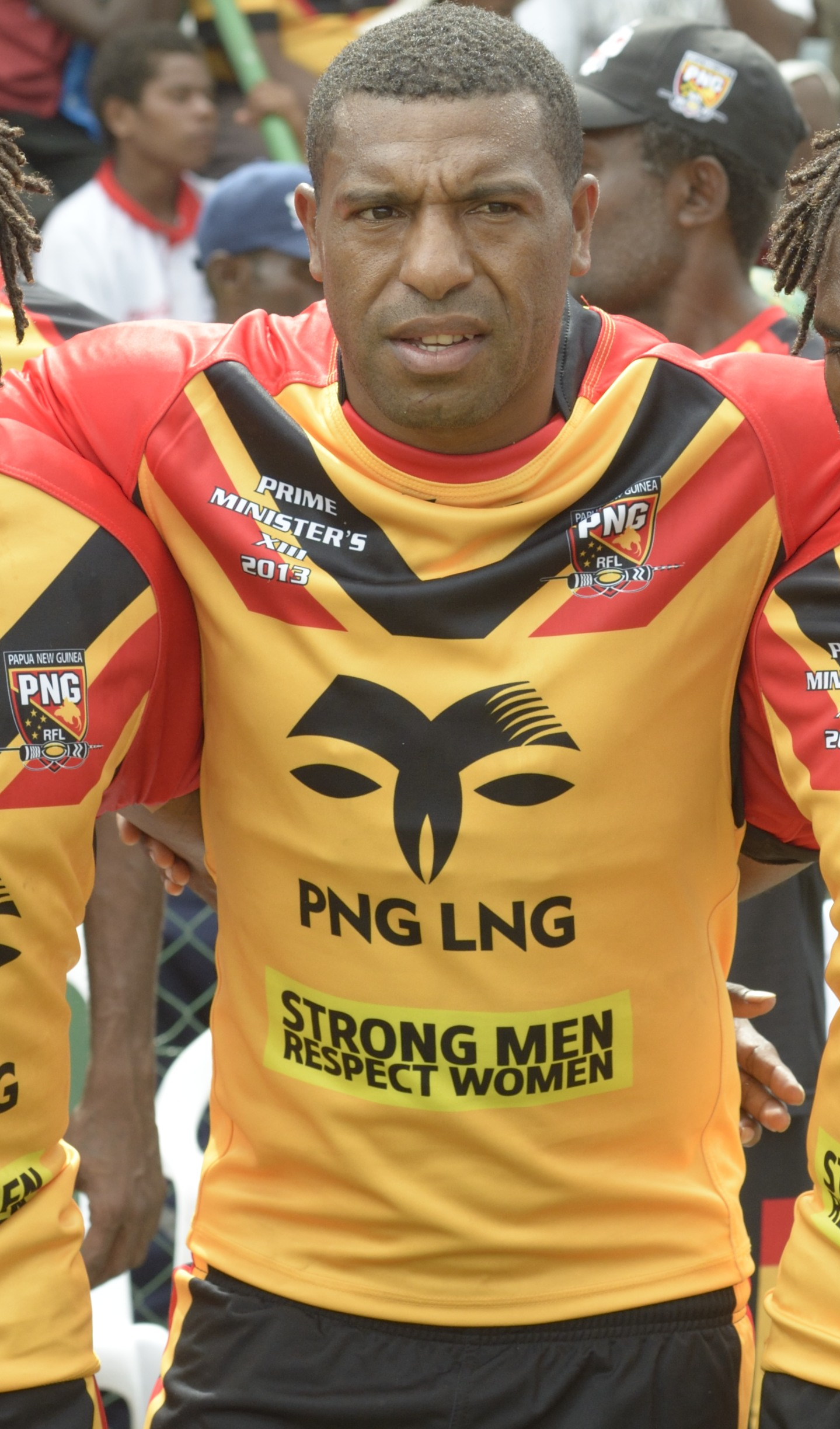

Personal information
- Born: 21 August 1986 Papua New Guinea
- Died: 24 October 2024 (aged 38)

Playing information
- Height: 180 cm (5 ft 11 in)
- Weight: 86 kg (13 st 8 lb)
- Position: Fullback
Club
Years	Team	Pld	T	G	FG	P
	Port Moresby Vipers	0	0	0	0	0
Representative
Years	Team	Pld	T	G	FG	P
2011–13	PNG Prime Minister's XIII	3	2	0	0	6
2013	Papua New Guinea	3	1	0	0	4
- Source: As of 9 November 2023

Josiah "Josty" Abavu (21 August 1986 – 29 October 2024) was a Papua New Guinean rugby league footballer who represented Papua New Guinea with the PNG Prime Minister's XIII from 2011 to 2013 and with the national team at the 2013 World Cup.

== Playing career ==
He played for the Port Moresby Vipers in PNG as a fullback.
