= Richard Kambo =

Papua New Guinea international rugby league footballer (born 1985)

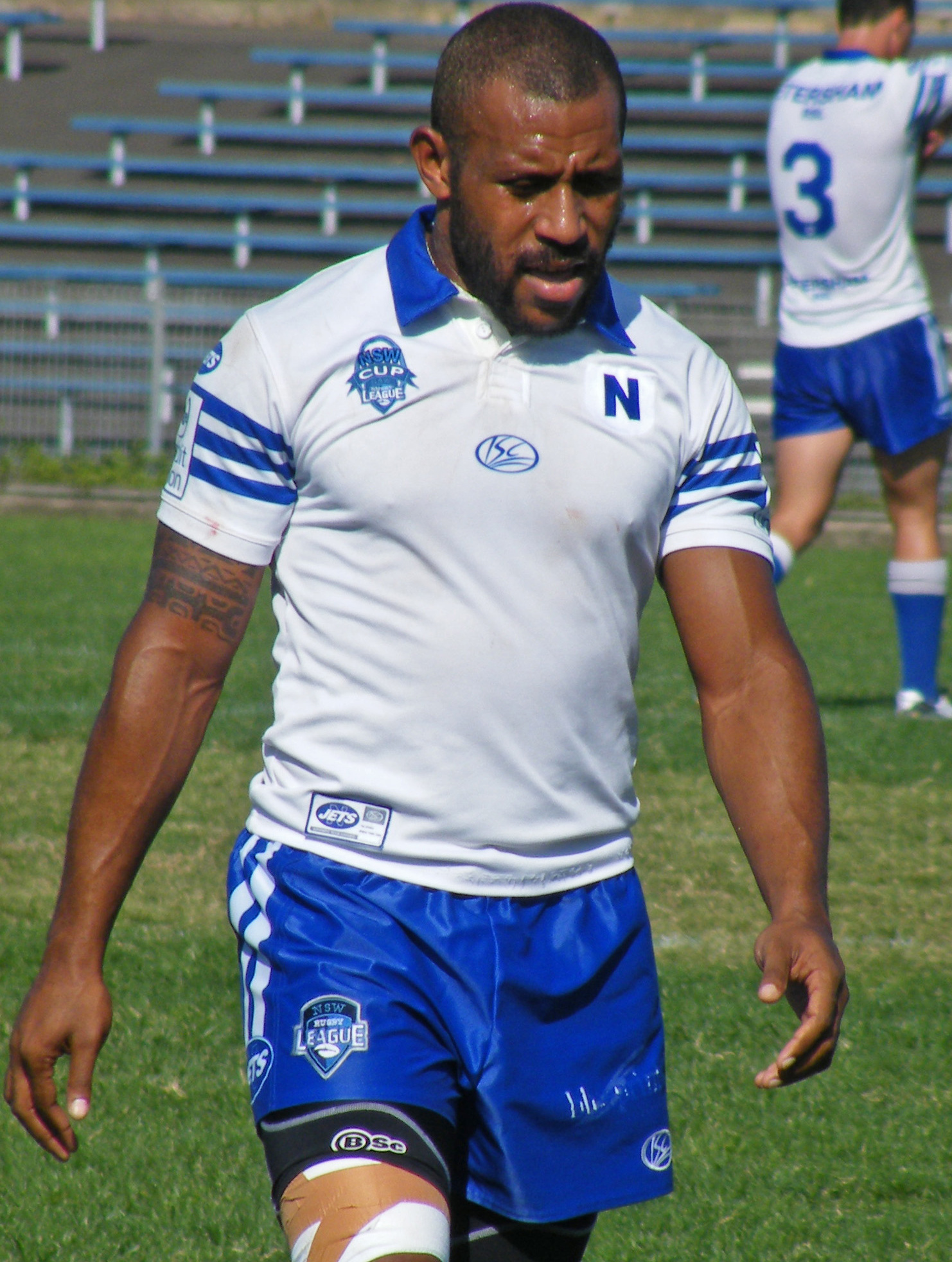

Personal information
- Born: 19 May 1985 (age 41) Papua New Guinea
- Height: 187 cm (6 ft 2 in)
- Weight: 96 kg (15 st 2 lb)

Playing information
- Position: Wing, Centre
Club
Years	Team	Pld	T	G	FG	P
	Port Moresby Vipers
Representative
Years	Team	Pld	T	G	FG	P
2007–13	Papua New Guinea	8	2	0	0	8
2011–15	PNG Prime Minister's XIII	4	1	0	0	4
- Source: As of 9 November 2023

Richard Kambo is a Papua New Guinea rugby league footballer who plays as a second row.

== Playing career ==
In 2010 Kambo played for the Newtown Jets in the New South Wales Cup. In 2012 he played for the Port Moresby Vipers.

He is a Papua New Guinea international.
