= Francis Paniu =

PNG international rugby league footballer

Personal information
- Born: 9 September 1989 (age 37) Papua New Guinea
- Height: 177 cm (5 ft 10 in)
- Weight: 85 kg (13 st 5 lb)

Playing information
- Position: Centre
Club
Years	Team	Pld	T	G	FG	P
	Rabaul Gurias
2014–	Rabaul Gurias
	Total	0	0	0	0	0
Representative
Years	Team	Pld	T	G	FG	P
2013	PNG Prime Minister's XIII	1	0	0	0	0
2013	Papua New Guinea	1	0	1	0	2
- Source: Francis Paniu rugbyleagueproject.org As of 9 November 2023

Francis Paniu is a Papua New Guinean rugby league footballer who represented Papua New Guinea in the 2013 World Cup.

== Playing career ==
As of 2013 he was playing for the Rabaul Gurias in PNG.
