= Paul Aiton =

Papua New Guinean international rugby league footballer

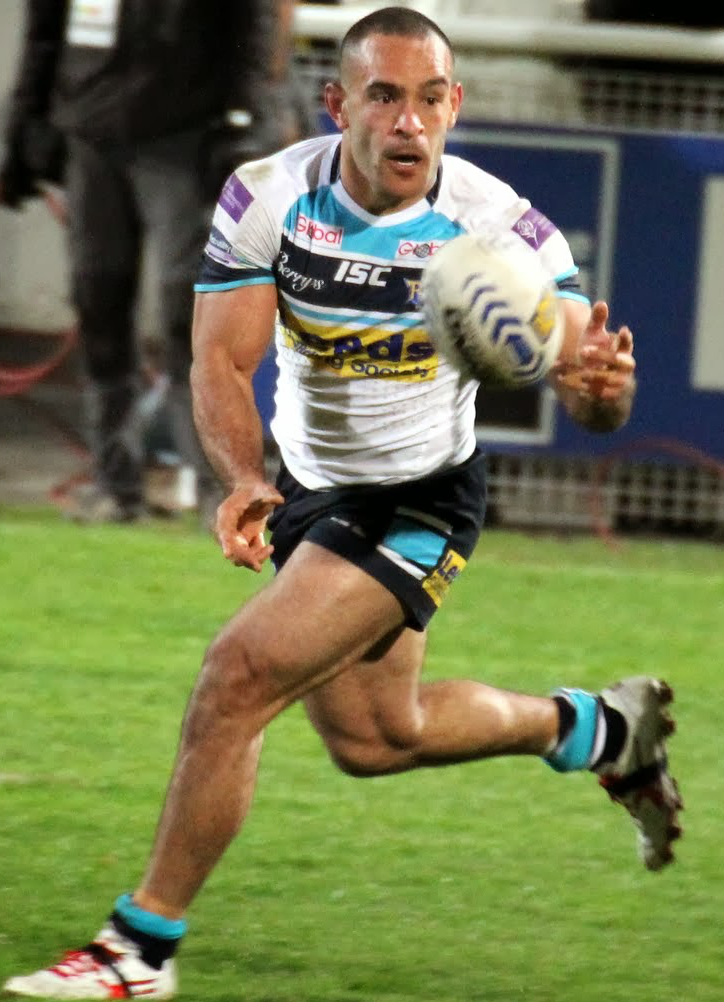

Personal information
- Born: 29 May 1985 (age 41) Mount Hagen, Western Highlands, Papua New Guinea

Playing information
- Height: 175 cm (5 ft 9 in)
- Weight: 88 kg (13 st 12 lb)
- Position: Hooker, Lock
Club
Years	Team	Pld	T	G	FG	P
2006–09	Penrith Panthers	72	8	0	0	32
2010–11	Cronulla Sharks	36	5	0	0	20
2012–13	Wakefield Trinity Wildcats	47	7	0	0	28
2014–15	Leeds Rhinos	47	3	0	0	12
2016–18	Catalans Dragons	48	3	0	0	12
	Total	250	26	0	0	104
Representative
Years	Team	Pld	T	G	FG	P
2007–17	Papua New Guinea	16	3	0	0	12
2006–13	PNG Prime Minister's XIII	7	0	0	0	0

Coaching information
Club
Years	Team	Gms	W	D	L	W%
2024–	PNG Hunters	0	0	0	0

Paul Aiton (born 1985) is a Papua New Guinean professional rugby league coach who is the head coach of the PNG Hunters in the Queensland Cup and the assistant-coach of the PNG Kumuls at international level.

He is a former professional rugby league footballer and Papua New Guinea international hooker. Aiton played for the Penrith Panthers and the Cronulla-Sutherland Sharks in the NRL, and the Wakefield Trinity Wildcats, Leeds Rhinos and the Catalans Dragons in the Super League.

== Early life ==
Born in Mount Hagen, Papua New Guinea to a Papua New Guinean mother, Anne, and an Australian father, John, Aiton moved to Caboolture, Queensland, Australia with his family at a young age. He played his junior rugby league for the Caboolture Snakes and attended Morayfield State Primary School before joining the Wests Panthers in Brisbane, where he was signed by the Penrith Panthers in 2003.

== Playing career ==
=== Penrith Panthers ===
After playing for Penrith's second-tier team, the St Mary's Cougars, in the NSWRL Premier League, Aiton was called upon to make his NRL début on 23 April 2006, starting at hooker for Penrith in their round 8 match against the Cronulla-Sutherland Sharks, as a result of an injury sustained by Craig Gower. Aiton made 13 further appearances from the bench in 2006, and was named Penrith's Ben Alexander Rookie of the Year. He played a total of 72 games, scoring 8 tries, for the Panthers between 2006 and 2009.

=== Cronulla-Sutherland Sharks ===
Aiton signed a 2-year deal with Cronulla in 2010 and went on to make 36 appearances, scoring 5 tries. At the end of the 2011 season it was announced he was to leave Cronulla to go play in the Super League.

Following his departure, he was one of seventeen Sharks players found guilty of using illegal substances under the club's 2011 supplements program. When the case was eventually concluded in 2016, Aiton had a twelve-month suspension recorded against his name, although he served none of the time due to backdating of the sanction.

=== Wakefield Trinity Wildcats ===
Aiton transferred to Wakefield Trinity Wildcats in England on a two-year contract from 2012. He made 47 appearances for them in 2 years scoring 7 tries.

=== Leeds Rhinos ===
In November 2013, Aiton signed a three-year contract with the Leeds Rhinos starting in 2014.

He played in the 2014 Challenge Cup Final victory over the Castleford Tigers at Wembley Stadium, Leeds' first in over a decade.

He missed part of the 2014 season due to medication he was taking that prevented him from playing. Aiton was injured towards the end of the 2015 season and missed out on winning the Treble with Leeds. He left making 47 appearances scoring 3 times.

=== Catalans Dragons ===
On 5 August 2015, Aiton decided not to sign a new deal with the Leeds Rhinos, instead moving on to play for France's biggest rugby league franchise the Catalans Dragons. Aiton said “I will always be honoured to have played for Leeds Rhinos but the opportunity to move to France from next season and be part of the Dragons was something that excited me at this stage in my career." He signed a three-year deal with the Dragons beginning in the 2016 season.

== Representative career ==
In 2004, Aiton was selected to play for Papua New Guinea against Australia in a non-Test match.

In 2007, Aiton played 3 matches for PNG during their end of season tour of Europe.

Aiton was named in the Papua New Guinea squad for the 2008 Rugby League World Cup.

He captained Papua New Guinea in the 2010 Four Nations tournament.

He again played for Papua New Guinea in the 2013 Rugby League World Cup and 2017 Rugby League World Cup.

== Coaching career ==
In 2021, Aiton was appointed assistant coach of the Papua New Guinea Hunters in the Queensland Cup.

On 17 Nov 2023, Aiton was appointed head-coach of the Papua New Guinea Hunters in the Queensland Cup.
