= Jessie Joe Parker =

PNG international rugby league footballer

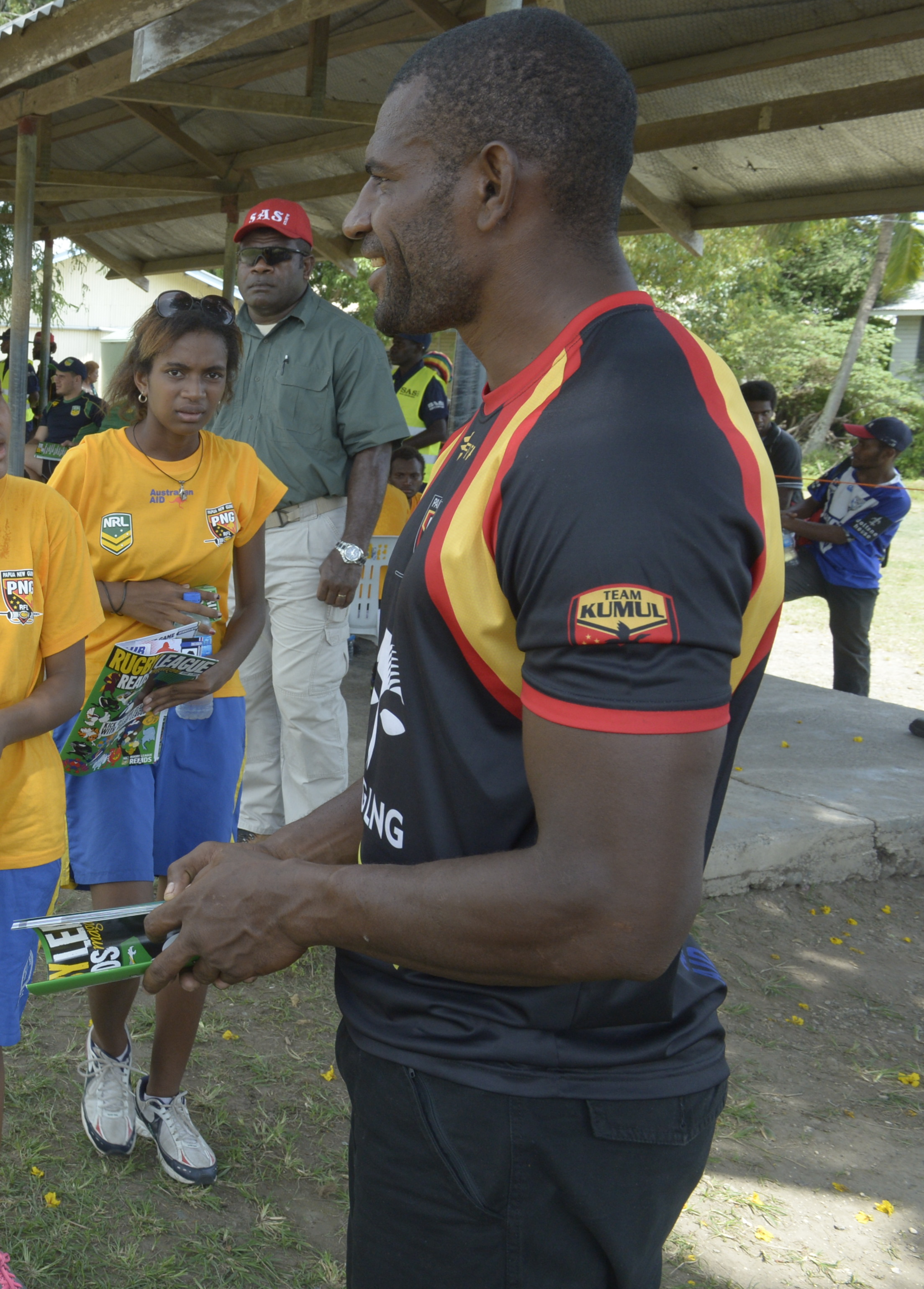

Personal information
- Full name: Jessie Joe Nandye
- Born: 22 August 1985 (age 40); Papua New Guinea
- Height: 183 cm (6 ft 0 in)
- Weight: 90 kg (14 st 2 lb)

Playing information
- Position: Centre
Club
Years	Team	Pld	T	G	FG	P
2010	Featherstone Rovers	15	17	0	0	68
2011	Wakefield Trinity Wildcats	0	0	0	0	0
2012–21	Whitehaven	203	96	1	0	385
	Total	218	113	1	0	453
Representative
Years	Team	Pld	T	G	FG	P
2005–13	PNG Prime Minister's XIII	7	3	0	0	12
2007–13	Papua New Guinea	13	2	0	0	8
- Source: As of 9 November 2023

Jessie Joe Nandye (born 22nd Aug 1985), also commonly known by his former name Jessie Joe Parker, is a Papua New Guinean former rugby league footballer who last played as a centre for Whitehaven in League 1.

He is a Papua New Guinean international representative.

== Playing career ==
After several impressive seasons in the PNG SP Inter-City Cup playing for the Pagini Simbu Warriors, Parker signed with the Queensland Cup side, the Northern Pride based in Cairns. However problems with visas prevented him coming to Australia.

In 2010, he joined Featherstone Rovers. Parker signed a two-year contract with the Wakefield Trinity Wildcats of the Super League in September 2010, but was released after he did not report for 2011 pre-season training. He joined Whitehaven in 2012 alongside fellow Papua New Guinean Glen Nami. Parker played his 100th match for Whitehaven on 28 March 2016 in their defeat by the Batley Bulldogs.

== Coaching career ==
Jesse Joe Parker became player/coach of NCL 3 side Hensingham ARLFC for the 2022 season. He is currently the club's top scorer with 13 tries.

Club statistics
Season	Team	Competition	Pld	T	G	FG	P
2010	Featherstone Rovers	Championship	15	17	0	0	68
2012	Whitehaven RLFC	Championship 1	18	9	0	0	36
2013	Whitehaven RLFC	Championship	25	21	0	0	84
2014	Whitehaven RLFC	Championship	25	17	1	0	70
2015	Whitehaven RLFC	Championship	23	6	0	0	24
2016	Whitehaven RLFC	Championship	25	7	0	0	28
2017	Whitehaven RLFC	League 1	27	16	0	0	64
2018	Whitehaven RLFC	League 1	25	7	0	0	28
Total			183	100	1	0	402

=== Representative career ===
Parker represented Papua New Guinea in 2007 when they played matches against France and Wales in Europe. In 2008, he was part of PNG's squad for the 2008 World Cup. He scored a try for PNG while competing at the 2009 Pacific Cup. Parker played for PNG at the 2010 Four Nations. He was a member of PNG's 2013 World Cup squad and scored a try against Samoa.

International statistics
Tournament	Pld	T	G	FG	P
2007 tour of Europe	3	0	0	0	0
2008 World Cup	3	0	0	0	0
2009 Pacific Cup	1	1	0	0	4
2010 Four Nations	3	0	0	0	0
2013 World Cup	3	1	0	0	4
Total	13	2	0	0	8
