= Dion Aiye =

PNG international rugby league footballer

Personal information
- Born: 6 November 1987 (age 37); Southern Highlands Province, Papua New Guinea
- Height: 181 cm (5 ft 11 in)
- Weight: 92 kg (203 lb; 14 st 7 lb)

Playing information
- Position: Scrum-half, Stand-off, Hooker
Club
Years	Team	Pld	T	G	FG	P
2007–08	Mt Hagen Eagles
2009–10	Agmark Gurias
2011	Mt Hagen Eagles
2012–14	Agmark Gurias
2014	Papua New Guinea Hunters	9	1	0	0	4
2015–24	Whitehaven	129	46	1	0	184
	Total	138	47	1	0	188
Representative
Years	Team	Pld	T	G	FG	P
2009–	Papua New Guinea	10	1	1	0	6
2009–14	PNG Prime Minister's XIII	5	1	0	0	4
- Source: As of 19 November 2024

Dion Aiye (born 6 November 1987) is a Papua New Guinean rugby league footballer who last played as a stand-off, scrum-half or loose forward for Whitehaven in Championship.

== Background ==
Aiye was born in Southern Highlands Province, Papua New Guinea.

== Playing career ==
Aiye played for the Kumuls in the 2010 Four Nations. He hails from the Southern Highlands Province of Papua New Guinea and started playing while attending Mt Hagen Secondary School. During his studies at Mt Hagen Secondary School Aiye joined the PNG school boys' rugby team and played against Australian school boys' rugby team in 2007. He then played for the Western Highlands Province provincial team, Mt Hagen Eagles, for three years. After Hagen Secondary he was selected to Kokopo Business College in Rabaul, East New Britain Province in 2009 and started playing with the Agmark Rabaul Gurias. Aiye had his first taste of senior representative football when he played for Papua New Guinea against the Fiji Batis in 2009. He played halfback for Papua New Guinea in the PM 13, Pacific Cup and in the Four Nations in 2010.

He was selected for Papua New Guinea in the 2013 Rugby League World Cup. In 2014 Aiye was also part of the Papua New Guinea Hunters team playing in the Queensland Cup.

== Legal issues ==
At Preston Crown Court on 9 February 2024, Aiye pleaded guilty to charges of assault by beating and harassment of his ex-partner. The assault took place in Barrow on 28 February 2021; the harassment, which involved the same victim, took place between 1 March 2021 and 5 July 2022. After the conviction, the Rugby Football League charge Aiye with off-field misconduct and a disciplinary tribunal banned him for eight matches.

In October 2024 Dion Aiye was charged with sexual assault, which is alleged to have taken place in May 2024. He will appear at Workington Magistrates’ Court on November 18. He was suspended from playing with immediate effect following the charge.

On 16 December 2024 it was later reported that he had been ordered to sign the sex offenders register.
