= Sebastien Pandia =

PNG international rugby league footballer

Sebastian Pandia
Personal information
- Born: 12 October 1990 (age 36) Papua New Guinea
- Height: 177 cm (5 ft 10 in)
- Weight: 94 kg (14 st 11 lb)

Playing information
- Position: Second-row
Club
Years	Team	Pld	T	G	FG	P
2013	Port Moresby Vipers
Representative
Years	Team	Pld	T	G	FG	P
2013–15	PNG Prime Minister's XIII	3	0	1	0	2
2013	Papua New Guinea	1	0	0	0	0
- Source: As of 9 November 2023

Sebastian Pandia is a Papua New Guinean rugby league footballer who represented Papua New Guinea in the 2013 World Cup.

== Playing career ==
In 2013 Pandia played for the Port Moresby Vipers in PNG. His position is second row.

As of 2016, he currently plays for the Ipswich Jets in the Queensland Cup.
