= Stanley Gene =

Former Papua New Guinean rugby league footballer and coach

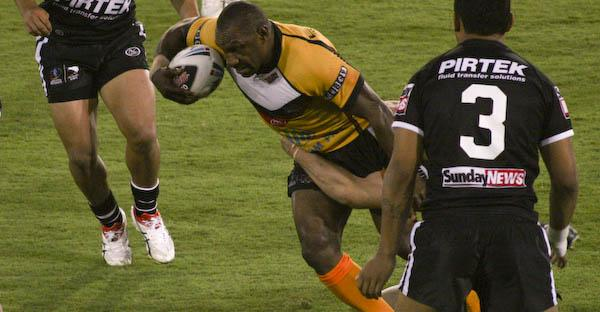
- Gene playing for PNG in 2008

Personal information
- Born: 11 May 1974 (age 52) Goroka, Papua New Guinea

Playing information
- Height: 5 ft 5 in (1.65 m)
- Weight: 87 kg (13 st 10 lb)
- Position: Utility
Club
Years	Team	Pld	T	G	FG	P
1993–94	Goroka Lahanis	10	21			84
1995	Lae Bombers	15	16			64
1996–00	Hull Kingston Rovers	111	94	0	0	376
2000–01	Hull FC	28	6	0	0	24
2001–05	Huddersfield Giants	76	27	0	0	108
2006–07	Bradford Bulls	22	7	0	0	28
2007–09	Hull Kingston Rovers	55	10	0	0	40
2010	Halifax	11	3	0	0	12
	Total	328	184	0	0	736
Representative
Years	Team	Pld	T	G	FG	P
1995–08	Papua New Guinea	16	6	0	1	25
2008	PNG Prime Minister's XIII	1	2	0	0	4

Coaching information
Club
Years	Team	Gms	W	D	L	W%
2014–15	Newcastle Thunder
Representative
Years	Team	Gms	W	D	L	W%
2010	PNG PM's XIII	1	0	0	1	0
2010	Papua New Guinea	3	0	0	3	0

Stanley Gene (born 11 May 1974) is a Papua New Guinean former rugby league Kumul (№ 166) player and Assistant Coach of Hull F.C. He previously coached Gateshead Thunder and assistant coach at Hull Kingston Rovers and served as the Papua New Guinea Kumuls head coach in 2010. Having moved to England following an impressive showing for PNG in the 1995 Rugby League World Cup, Gene enjoyed a long career in the British game with spells at Hull Kingston Rovers, Huddersfield Giants, Bradford Bulls, Hull FC and Halifax.

Gene was a versatile player with the ability to cover virtually any position on the pitch, though he spent most of his test career playing at stand off (off-half). He was a regular for the PNG Kumuls for 14 years between 1994 and 2008, and captained the side on at least three occasions, including being the PNG captain during the 2008 Rugby League World Cup, before retiring from international rugby league following the 2008 tournament. Gene is considered a hero in his home country and almost universally regarded as a rugby league legend.

== Career ==
=== Club career ===
Gene was born in Goroka. After playing in the 1995 Rugby League World Cup for Papua New Guinea, Gene was offered a contract to play for Hull Kingston Rovers in the old Second Division. After moving to the United Kingdom, Gene played for Hull KR from 1996 to 2000. He scored 94 Tries in 111 matches during that period, and was a massively popular figure at the club. He moved to Gateshead and was then forced to play for rivals Hull F.C. when they merged. However, he had a frustrating time there, mainly featuring as a substitute. He was granted a release from his contract midway through 2001 and allowed to look for another club.

Gene signed with Huddersfield Giants midway through 2001, but was unable to save them from relegation. However, he was instrumental in the club's unbeaten run and promotion back into Super League the following year. He went on to establish himself as one of Huddersfield's most important players.

Gene moved to the Bradford Bulls for the 2006 Season. Along with fellow Papua New Guinea national Marcus Bai, Gene's first match for the club was their win the 2006 World Club Challenge against the Wests Tigers. He played from the interchange bench and scored a try in the Bradford Bulls' 30–10 victory. After only one season with the Bradford Bulls, he was allowed to rejoin Hull Kingston Rovers.

Gene returned to Hull Kingston Rovers, his first English club, following their promotion to Super League in 2007. He provided experience and a steadying influence as the club established itself in Super League, before being allowed to leave at the end of the 2009 season.

Following his release from Hull Kingston Rovers, Gene signed for Cooperative Championship side Halifax for the 2010 season along with fellow countryman and close friend Makali Aizue.

=== PNG ===
Gene's representative career lasted over a decade. He made his test début for PNG against France at the Lloyd Robson Oval in Port Moresby during the France's tour of Oceania in 1994. Selected as a substitute for his first test, Gene contributed a field goal in PNG's 29–22 win.. He then went on to play for the Kumuls during the 1995 Rugby League World Cup in England, and also played in the 2000 and 2008 World Cups. In addition, he represented his country in numerous test matches before announcing his intention to retire from international rugby league following the 2008 World Cup.

Following PNG's exit from the tournament, he was tearfully carried from the field by his teammates and given a standing ovation by the 16,239 strong crowd at the Dairy Farmers Stadium in Townsville, Australia (his last game was a 46–6 defeat by the Kangaroos).

=== Coaching ===
In 2010, Adrian Lam stepped down as the coach of the PNG national team. Within a few days, it was announced that Gene would be installed as his replacement. The first game under Gene's leadership was the annual fixture between PNG and the Australian PM's XIII. Gene went on to coach the team for the 2010 Four Nations in Australia and New Zealand, failing to register a victory over tournament winner New Zealand, runner up Australia, and England.

In September 2013 Gene was appointed head coach of Gateshead Thunder (now Newcastle Thunder) for the 2014 season.

== Personal life ==
Gene lives in Yorkshire, Gene has three sons, Cameron, Elliott and Leo. In 2006, he paid for the installation of electricity in his home village of Segu, located on the outskirts of Goroka. In 2012, he set up the Stanley Gene Foundation, aiming to supply donations to the deprived areas of Papua New Guinea.

=== Pronunciation of 'Gene' ===
There has been confusion over the pronunciation of 'Gene'. "When I first arrived in England people called me Gene (Jean) and I thought it sounded quite posh, so I got used to it, but it is Gene (Gennay), that's how it is pronounced back home."

=== Stanley Gene's age ===
Stanley Gene's age was a major talking point about the player for many years. Although his date of birth registered with the Rugby Football League (RFL) was 11 May 1974, many of his former teammates and coaches insisted he was considerably older than this.

In 2008, Gene himself stated that he was 34, and explained that some people believe that Papua New Guineans "look older in the face" than in other countries. Despite this explanation, it was rumoured that he was unable to provide a birth certificate to prove his age, and that he allegedly held several passports with different dates of birth. Former Wigan player Bryan Fletcher predicted that Gene could be as old as 45.

On 11 May 2013, Gene confirmed that it was his 39th birthday. He showed guests at his birthday dinner his birth certificate, which confirmed that his date of birth is 11 May 1974.
