= Jason Tali =

PNG international rugby league footballer

Personal information
- Born: 7 July 1987 (age 39) Papua New Guinea

Playing information
- Height: 178 cm (5 ft 10 in)
- Weight: 95 kg (14 st 13 lb)
- Position: Centre
Club
Years	Team	Pld	T	G	FG	P
2015–16	Newcastle Thunder	15	16	0	0	64
2016–25	Doncaster RLFC	153	106	1	0	426
2025(loan)	→ Goole Vikings	8	0	0	0	0
	Total	176	122	1	0	490
Representative
Years	Team	Pld	T	G	FG	P
2012–14	PNG Prime Minister's XIII	3	0	0	0	0
2013	Papua New Guinea	2	0	0	0	0

Jason Tali is a Papua New Guinean rugby league footballer who last played as a centre for Goole Vikings in RFL League 1, whilst on short-term loan from Doncaster RLFC in the Championship. He represented Papua New Guinea in the 2013 World Cup.

== Playing career ==
=== Doncaster RLFC ===
He played for Doncaster RLFC in the Championship in England. His position was at centre.

On 12 September 2025 it was reported that he would retire at the end of the 2025 season

=== Goole Vikings (loan) ===
On 22 May 2025 it was reported that he had signed for Goole Vikings in the RFL League 1 on short-term loan
