= Adrian Lam =

Papua New Guinea rugby league coach and former international footballer

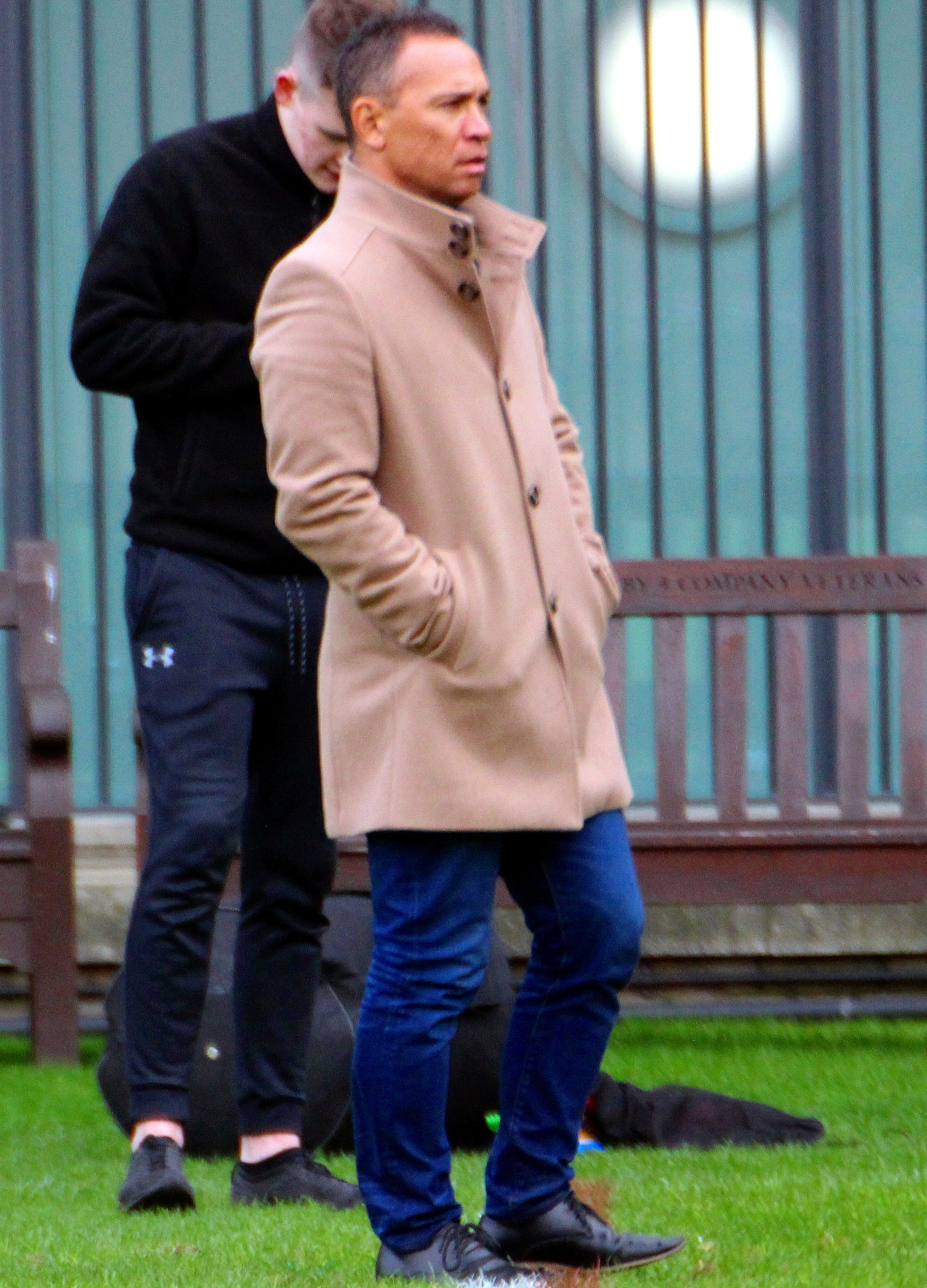

Personal information
- Born: 25 August 1970 (age 56) Rabaul, Papua New Guinea
- Height: 5 ft 9 in (1.75 m)
- Weight: 12 st 0 lb (76 kg)

Playing information
- Position: Scrum-half
Club
Years	Team	Pld	T	G	FG	P
1994–00	Sydney Roosters	146	42	0	6	174
2001–04	Wigan Warriors	119	44	1	10	188
	Total	265	86	1	16	362
Representative
Years	Team	Pld	T	G	FG	P
1994–00	Papua New Guinea	12	7	1	1	31
1995–00	Queensland	14	4	0	0	16
1996	P.N.G. Palais	1	0	0	0	0
1997	Rest of the World	1	0	0	0	0

Coaching information
Club
Years	Team	Gms	W	D	L	W%
2019–21	Wigan Warriors	84	51	0	33	61
2021–	Leigh Leopards	161	111	2	48	69
	Total	245	162	2	81	66
Representative
Years	Team	Gms	W	D	L	W%
2006–09	PNG PM's XIII	4	0	1	3	0
2006–09	Papua New Guinea	7	2	0	5	29
2011–13	PNG PM's XIII	3	0	0	3	0
2011–13	Papua New Guinea	6	2	0	4	33
- Source: As of 18 June 2026
- Relatives: Lachlan Lam (son)

Adrian Lam (born 25 August 1970) is a Papua New Guinean professional rugby league coach who is the head coach of the Leigh Leopards in the Super League and a former professional rugby league footballer.

He played for the Sydney Roosters in the National Rugby League and the Wigan Warriors in the Super League. He represented Papua New Guinea, the Queensland State of Origin team and the Rest of the World team.

He was the head coach of Papua New Guinea between 2007 and 2012. He was assistant coach for Australia in the 2021 World Cup.

== Background ==
Lam was born 25 August 1970 in Rabaul, Papua New Guinea. His mother was from Liverpool and migrated to Australia as a child. She met Lam's father, a Chinese Papua New Guinean, in Rabaul. The family moved to Brisbane in the Australian state of Queensland when Lam was seven.

== Playing career ==
Lam had a fertile career with 14 State of Origin matches for Queensland, including a man-of-the-match performance in the third game of the 1995 series. He made his Test début for Papua New Guinea in 1994 and went on to win 11 caps, scoring 3 tries and kicking 1 field goal. In 1996, he captained the Papua New Guinea against Australia. In 1997, he captained the 'Rest of the World' team against Australia. He captained the Kumuls to the quarter finals in the 2000 Rugby League World Cup. He played at halfback for the Sydney Roosters in their 2000 NRL Grand Final defeat by the Brisbane Broncos.

He played a total of 146 club games for the Sydney Roosters, scoring 42 tries and kicking 6 field goals, as well as 119 first team games for Wigan Warriors, scoring 44 tries, kicking 1 goal and 10 field goals, including a try in their 2001 Super League Grand Final defeat by the Bradford Bulls.

Lam is one of only a few players to have played State of Origin for Queensland and for a country other than Australia. He is also the only player to be captain of a Queensland side and captain of a national team other than Australia.

== Coaching career ==
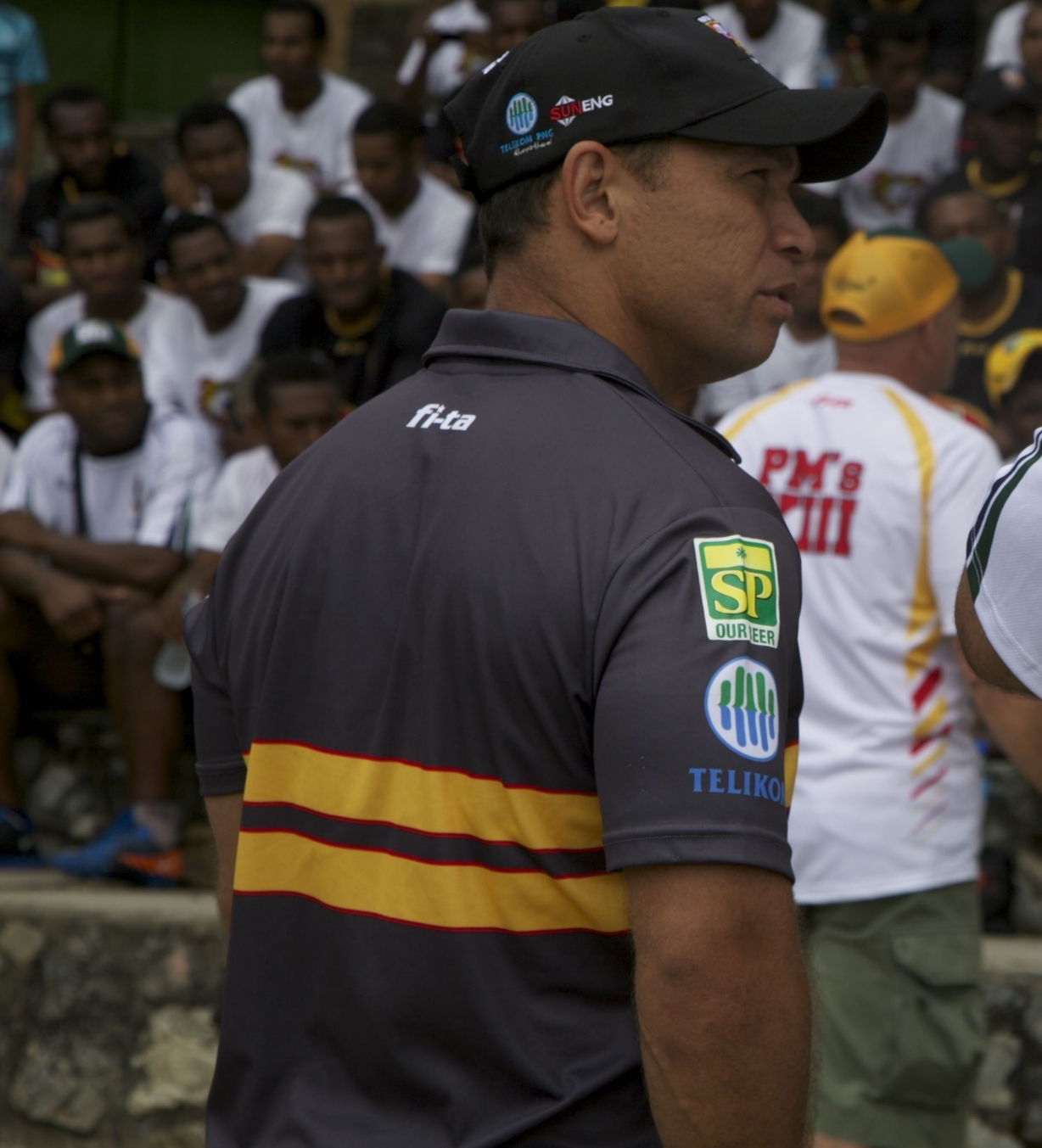
Lam in 2012

Lam became coach of Papua New Guinea's national team, the Kumuls, in 2007, and was in charge for their 2008 Rugby League World Cup campaign. He quit as Kumuls' coach in 2009 after a dispute with the Papua New Guinea Rugby Football League.

In June 2007 he was appointed inaugural coach of the new QRL Wizard Queensland Cup Northern Pride team based in Cairns. However, three months later he was offered the position of assistant coach at the NRL Sydney Roosters under their new coach Brad Fittler. Lam was released and he left Cairns for Sydney before the Pride's first game.

In 2009 he moved to the St. George Illawarra Dragons as assistant coach under Wayne Bennett. Lam became the coach of the St George-Illawarra Dragons Under 20s team in 2010 and 2011. He returned as coach of Papua New Guinea in 2012.

Lam returned to Wigan Warriors in 2019 as interim Head Coach and later in 2019 made his spell as Wigan coach full time as he signed for another year after Shaun Edwards opted not to join Wigan for 2020. In 2020, Lam coached Wigan to the League Leaders Shield and guided them to the 2020 Super League Grand Final against St Helens where Wigan lost 8-4 after a try scored by the Saints following the full-time siren. Lam was seen openly crying during the post match interviews. In round 20 of the 2021 Super League season, Wigan were defeated at the DW Stadium by St Helens 2-26 under Lam's coaching. It was the first time in the club's history, since moving to the DW Stadium in 1999, that they had failed to score a single try. The following week, in Round 21, Wigan were beaten at home by Leeds 0-14, and this was the first time in Super League era that Wigan had been held scoreless at home. On 31 August 2021 after a number of poor results, Lam announced that he would be leaving Wigan at the end of the 2021 season, after three seasons in charge. Lam's final game in charge of Wigan came in the first week of the 2021 Playoffs Series against Leeds where Wigan lost 8-0. On 17 November 2021, Lam was announced as head coach of Betfred Championship side Leigh Centurions, replacing interim head coach Kurt Haggerty. On 3 October 2022, Lam coached Leigh in their Million Pound Game victory over Batley which saw the club promoted back to the Super League. Lam achieved the double in his first full season as Leigh coach as the club also won the RFL 1895 Cup.

On 12 August 2023, Lam guided Leigh to victory in the 2023 Challenge Cup final against Hull Kingston Rovers. It was Leigh's first major trophy in 52 years. Lam guided Leigh to a fifth placed finish in the 2023 Super League season. Leigh were eliminated in the first week of the playoffs against Hull Kingston Rovers. In the 2024 Super League season, Lam took Leigh to the semi-final against arch-rivals Wigan where they lost 38-0. The following year in 2025, Lam guided Leigh to a third placed finish on the table. For a second consecutive year, Leigh played Wigan in the semi-final where they lost 18-6.

== Personal life ==
He has 2 sons Lachlan Lam and Bailey Lam. His son Lachlan Lam is a professional rugby player, who represents Papua New Guinea and plays for the Leigh Leopards.

In 2010 a court ordered former State of Origin teammate Dale Shearer to repay approximately $1.5m to Lam for an outstanding loan, which dated back to 2005.

== Honours ==
=== As player ===
==== Wigan Warriors ====
- Challenge Cup
  - Winners (1): 2002

==== Queensland ====
- State of Origin
  - Winners (2): 1995, 1999

==== Individual ====
- Super League Dream Team
  - Winners (3): 2001, 2002, 2003
- RLWBA Player of the Year:
  - Winners (1): 2002

=== As Head Coach ===
==== Wigan Warriors ====
- League Leaders' Shield
  - Winners (1): 2020

==== Leigh Leopards ====
- Challenge Cup
  - Winners (1): 2023
- RFL Championship
  - Winners (1): 2022
- Championship Leaders' Shield
  - Winners (1): 2022
- RFL 1895 Cup
  - Winners (1): 2022

==== Individual ====
- Super League Coach of the Year
  - Winners (1): 2023
