= Papua New Guinea Hunters =

Papua New Guinea professional rugby league club, based in Port Moresby

Club information
- Full name: Papua New Guinea Hunters Rugby League Football Club
- Nickname: The Hunters
- Short name: PNG Hunters
- Colours: Gold; Black; Red
- Founded: 2013; 13 years ago
- Website: www.pnghunters.com

Current details
- Grounds: National Football Stadium, 2016– (14,800); Kalabond Oval, 2014–2015 (7,000)
- CEO: Scott Barker
- Chairman: Stan Joyce
- Coach: Paul Aiton
- Captain: Ila Alu
- Competition: Hostplus Cup
- Current season

Records
- Premierships (2nd grade): 1 (2017)
- Most capped: 135 – Wartovo Puara

The Papua New Guinea Hunters (also referred to as PNG Hunters) are a professional rugby league football club based in Papua New Guinea. They were formed in December 2013 and compete in the Queensland Cup, a second tier competition in Australia. The Hunters are the second Papua New Guinean side to enter the Queensland Cup following the Port Moresby Vipers who competed for two seasons in 1996 and 1997. Every Hunters match is shown live on national free-to-air television. The Hunters' home ground is the National Football Stadium in Port Moresby and their team colours are gold, black and red. The Hunters won the Queensland Cup in 2017.

Since 2023, they are one of the feeder clubs for the Dolphins in the Australian National Rugby League and will be a feeder to the Papua New Guinea Chiefs in 2028.

== Papua New Guinea NRL Bid ==
The Australian Labor Party have pledged their support behind a PNG team entering the National Rugby League competition. Papua New Guinea have introduced a National Schools Rugby League Championships which started in 2019 to prepare its junior rugby league talent from the six year olds to the Under 18 divisions for the future. The PNG Government, Australian Government, PNGRFL and QRL signed an agreement which will see the Australian Government assisting to develop the sport in the country. Titled 'Growing and Supporting Rugby League in Papua New Guinea', it is an Australian Government initiative to develop pathways for PNG teams like the Hunters Under 21s and Hunters Women's to play in high-level Australian sporting competitions with a focus on female athlete development, wellbeing and education, and commercial sustainability under the three year program. The PNG Government have officially launched the Papua New Guinea NRL Bid to participate in the Australian NRL Competition as the 18th team. Andrew Hill, former Canterbury Bulldogs and RLWC 2017 CEO will lead the PNG 2028 NRL Bid. Women, Under-19 boys, Under-19 girls national competitions will start from 2025 to 2027.

== Strategic pathways partnership with Dolphins ==
In May 2022, the PNG Hunters announced a strategic pathways partnership with the Dolphins that includes full NRL pre-season participation for four young Papua New Guinean players, beginning in the PNGNRL Digicel Cup, through to the PNG Hunters in the Hostplus Cup and then directly into the Australian NRL system.

== Stadiums ==
=== Kalabond Oval ===
The Kalabond Oval which is in the town of Kokopo and has a capacity of 7,000 was the Hunters first home ground. The first ever home match in the Intrust Super Cup was against the defending champions Mackay Cutters on 8 March 2014 which the Hunters won 24-16. The ground was used for the club's first 2 seasons.

=== National Football Stadium ===
The National Football Stadium is in the capital city Port Moresby and after undergoing a major refurbishment it was announced in February 2016 that the Hunters would move to the ground for the 2016 season, after they'd played one match there during the 2015 season against Souths Logan Magpies on 13 June 2015 winning 34-12.

== 2025 squad ==
PNG Hunters
| First team squad | | | Coaching staff |
|---|---|---|---|
| Morea Morea – FB; Solo Wane – WG; Brandon Nima – WG, CE (vc); Rob Mathias – CE; Elijah Roltinga – WG, CE; Finley Glare – HK, SO; Jamie Mavoko – SO; Epel Kapinias – PR, LK; Trevor Solu – HK; Koso Bandi – PR, SR; Benji Kot – CE, SR; Limbi Henry – SR; Ila Alu – LK (c) | Sanny Wabo – FB; Alex Max – CE, SR; Steven Bruno – PR; Jordan Pat – SR; Clent Lama – CE; Joshua Mire – HB, SO; Bradley Orosambo – HB; Gairo Voro – SO; Finley Muno – WG; Joshua Lau – SO; Manase Kai – SR; Cedric Kuli – SR; Himson Ulalom – PR, SR | Emmanuel Balio – PR, SR; Smith Pamundi – PR, SR; Vane Manuma – PR, SR; Seal Kalo – PR, SR | Head coach: Paul Aiton; Assistant coach: Enoch Maki; Scott Barker (CEO); Edward Guise (Strength and Conditioning Coach); Mong Tavol (Head Trainer); Butler Morris (Trainer); Simon Morris (Physiotherapist); Legend: (c) Captain(s); (vc) Vice-captain(s); Updated: 12 November 2024; Source(s): |

== Notable players ==
- Justin Olam
- Edwin Ipape
- Rodrick Tai
- Sylvester Namo
- Judah Rimbu

== See also ==
- Rugby league in Papua New Guinea
