= 2017 PNG Hunters season =

- Queensland Cup Rank: 1st

Team information
- CEO: Reatau Rau
- Coach: Michael Marum
- Captain: Ase Boas
- Stadium: National Football Stadium
← 2016	2018 →

The 2017 Intrust Super Cup was the PNG Hunters fourth season in the Queensland Cup and they also won their first premiership title that year.

== Season summary ==
The PNG Hunters won their first ever minor premiership and went on to claim their maiden premiership edging out the Sunshine Coast Falcons in the grand final 12–10. They then advanced to the NRL State Championship final against the NSW Cup champions Penrith Panthers where they were beaten 42–18 in Sydney on NRL Grand final day. Ten of their players were selected in the 23-man PNG Kumuls squad for the 2017 Rugby League World Cup.

== 2017 squad ==
PNG Hunters
First team squad		Coaching staff
Adex Wera – FB, WG; Stargroth Amean – WG; Bland Abavu – CE; Butler Morris – CE; Wawa Paul – WG; Ase Boas – SO; Watson Boas – HB; Enoch Maki – PR; Wartovo Puara – HK; Esau Siune – PR; Stanton Albert – SR; Wellington Albert – SR; Moses Meninga – LK	Nixon Put – SR; David Loko – PR; Eddie Dafa – PR; Gahuna Sailas – SO; Edward Goma – FB; Israel Eliab – CE; Anderson Benford – SR; Willie Minoga – WG; Lawrence Tu'u – FB; Karo Kauna Jnr – WG	Head coach: Michael Marum; Assistant coaches: Nigel Hukula; Roger Laka; Legend: (c) Captain(s); (vc) Vice-captain(s); Updated: 5 January 2017; Source(s):

== Squad movement ==
=== Gains ===
Player	Signed From	Until End of	Notes
Wellington Albert	Penrith Panthers	2017	
Stanton Albert	Penrith Panthers	2017	
Israel Eliab	London Broncos	2017	
Willie Minoga	Townsville Blackhawks	2018	

=== Losses ===
Player	Signed To	Until End of	Notes
Thompson Teteh	Redcliffe Dolphins	2017	
