= 2018 Papua New Guinea Hunters season =

- Queensland Cup rank: 7th

Team information
- CEO: Reatau Rau
- Coach: Michael Marum
- Captain: Ase Boas
- Stadium: National Football Stadium
← 2017	2019 →

The 2018 Intrust Super Cup was the PNG Hunters fifth season in the Queensland Cup.

== Season summary ==
The Hunters started with a trial against the Brisbane Broncos in Port Moresby on February 24, 2018 where they lost 26-12. The Hunters finished the season in seventh spot missing out on the finals series. Ten PNG Hunters players from the 2018 squad were recruited by overseas clubs.

== 2018 squad ==
PNG Hunters
First team squad		Coaching staff
Adex Wera – FB, WG; Stargroth Amean – WG; Thompson Teteh – CE; Butler Morris – CE; Junior Rau – WG; Ase Boas – SO; Watson Boas – HB; Enoch Maki – PR; Wartovo Puara – HK; Dilbert Isaac – PR; Stanton Albert – SR; Mckenzie Yei – SR; Moses Meninga – LK	Baundo Aba – SR; Patrick Morea – PR; Eddie Dafa – PR; William Mone – SO; Brendon Gotuno – WG; Edene Gebbie – FB; Willie Minoga – SR; Rhadley Brawa – LK; Charlie Simon – SO; Nixon Put – SR; Wawa Paul – WG; Ila Alu – LK	Head coach: Michael Marum; Assistant coaches: Nigel Hukula; Solomon Kuliniasi; Roger Laka; Legend: (c) Captain(s); (vc) Vice-captain(s); Updated: 22 January 2018; Source(s):

== Squad movement ==
=== Gains ===
Player	Signed From	Until end of	Notes
Thompson Teteh	Ipswich Jets	2018	
Stanton Albert	Widnes Vikings (released)	2019	

=== Losses ===
Player	Signed To	Until end of	Notes
Wellington Albert	Widnes Vikings	2018	

== Fixtures ==
=== Pre-season ===
The Hunters lost to the Brisbane Broncos 26-12 in Port Moresby on February 24, 2018.
