= 2019 Papua New Guinea Hunters season =

- Queensland Cup Rank: 13th

Team information
- CEO: Reatau Rau
- Coach: Michael Marum
- Captain: Moses Meninga
- Stadium: National Football Stadium
← 2018	2020 →

The 2019 Intrust Super Cup was the PNG Hunters sixth season in the Queensland Cup after securing their future for the next four years until 2022. Adex Wera was the captain of the team and he was assisted by his deputy Moses Meninga. The Hunters only won four of their games and drew one with a record eighteen losses for the season. 18 new players made their debuts while poor form and discipline let the team down. Five Hunters players were named in the Papua New Guinea Kumuls squad for the 2019 Oceania Cup (rugby league) Pool B Ox & Palm Pacific Invitational Tests against Toa Samoa and Fiji Bati and also for the match against the touring Great Britain Lions .

== 2019 squad ==
PNG Hunters
First team squad			Coaching staff
Terry Wapi – FB; Junior Rau – WG; Adex Wera – CE, FB (vc); Brandon Nima – WG, CE; Butler Morris – CE, WG; Ase Boas – SO, HB; Charlie Simon – HB; Moses Meninga – PR (c); Gahuna Sailas – HK; Enoch Maki – PR; McKenzie Yei – SR; Epel Kapinias – SR; Baundo Aba – LK	Daniel Tapol – SR, CE; Justin Yoka – HB; Jordan Pat – SR; Dilbert Isaac – PR, LK; Stanton Albert – SR; Gairo Kapana – WG; Jerry Teme – HB; Wawa Paul – WG; Nick Hasu – SO; Shane Haro – CE; Roy Elison – WG; Woods Kawage – HK; Patrick Morea – SR, HK	Kevin Appo – SR; Ila Alu – SR; Rex Kaupa – SR; Smith Siviri – CE; Brendon Gotuno – WG, CE; Bland Abavu – FB, CE; Willie Minoga – PR; Garry Lo – WG; David Loko – SR	Head coach: Michael Marum; Assistant coaches: Glen Nami; Roderick Puname; Legend: (c) Captain(s); (vc) Vice-captain(s); Updated: 20 February 2019; Source(s):

== Squad movement ==
=== Gains ===
Player	Signed from	Until end of	Notes
Ase Boas	Featherstone Rovers (released)	2019	
Brendon Gotuno	Penrith Panthers (visa issues)	2019	

=== Losses ===
Player	Signed to	Until end of	Notes
Thompson Teteh	Featherstone Rovers	2019	
Watson Boas	Featherstone Rovers	2019	
Stargroth Amean	Barrow Raiders	2019	
Wartovo Puara	Barrow Raiders	2019	
Willie Minoga	Barrow Raiders	2019	
Edene Gebbie	Wynnum Manly Seagulls	2019	
Rhadley Brawa	Wynnum Manly Seagulls	2019	
Nixon Put	Norths Devils	2019	

== Ladder ==
Pos	Team	Pld	W	D	L	B	PF	PA	PD	Pts
1	Sunshine Coast Falcons	23	21	1	1	0	544	166	310	43
2	Wynnum Manly Seagulls	23	18	0	5	0	453	170	283	36
3	Burleigh Bears	23	17	0	6	0	384	234	150	34
4	Townsville Blackhawks	23	17	0	6	0	296	198	98	34
5	Norths Devils	23	15	0	8	0	377	288	89	30
6	Tweed Heads Seagulls	23	14	0	9	0	262	244	18	28
7	Redcliffe Dolphins	23	13	0	10	0	298	284	14	26
8	Easts Tigers	23	10	1	12	0	268	365	-97	21
9	Ipswich Jets	23	9	1	13	0	257	288	-31	19
10	Souths Logan Magpies	23	7	1	15	0	254	298	-44	15
11	Mackay Cutters	23	7	0	16	0	206	349	-143	14
12	Northern Pride	23	5	0	18	0	186	386	-200	10
13	Papua New Guinea Hunters	23	4	1	18	0	315	750	-435	9
14	Central Queensland Capras	23	1	1	21	0	196	498	-302	3

- The team highlighted in blue has clinched the minor premiership
- Teams highlighted in green have qualified for the finals
- The team highlighted in red has clinched the wooden spoon

=== Regular season ===
Date	Round	Opponent	Venue	Score	Tries	Goals	Attendance
Sunday, 10 March	Round 1	Tweed Heads Seagulls	Piggabeen Sports Complex	0-10			
Sunday, 17 March	Round 2	Northern Pride	National Football Stadium	0-24			
Sunday, 24 March	Round 3	Sunshine Coast Falcons	National Football Stadium	26-28	Joshua 3, Rau, Yoka	Simon 3/5	
Saturday, 30 March	Round 4	Easts Tigers	Langlands Park	14-30	Rau 2, Simon	Boas 1/2	
Saturday, 6 April	Round 5	Norths Devils	Bishop Park	6-28	Gotuno	Boas 1/2	
Saturday, 13 April	Round 6	CQ Capras	McIndoe Park Emerald	28-10	Gotuno, Rop, Abavu, Simon, Meninga	Boas 4/5	
Saturday, 20 April	Round 7	Ipswich Jets	National Football Stadium	10-28	Nima, Kawage	Boas 1/2	
Thursday, 25 April	Round 8	Burleigh Bears	Pizzey Park	4-56	Nima		
Sunday, 5 May	Round 9	Townsville Blackhawks	National Football Stadium	14-24	Abavu, Nima, Gotuno	Simon 1/2	
Sunday, 19 May	Round 10	Wynnum Manly Seagulls	National Football Stadium	6-28	Abavu	Boas 1/1	
Saturday, 25 May	Round 11	Souths Logan Magpies	National Football Stadium	24-22	Kapana, Wapi, Meninga, Rau	Hasu 4/5	
Saturday, 1 June	Round 12	Redcliffe Dolphins	Dolphin Park	8-48	Kapana, Wapi		
Sunday, 9 June	Round 13	Mackay Cutters	National Football Stadium	26-34	Wera 2, Nima 2, Morea	Boas 1/2 Hasu 2/4	
Saturday, 15 June	Round 14	Tweed Heads Seagulls	National Football Stadium	20-16	Meninga, Rau, Wapi, Nima	Hasu 2/4	
Saturday, June 29	Round 15	Northern Pride	Barlow Park	14-34	Tapol, Haro, Appo	Boas 1/3	
Sunday, 7 July	Round 16	Norths Devils	National Football Stadium	18-30	Rau, Hasu, Nima	Boas 2/2 Hasu 1/1	
Sunday, 14 July	Round 17	Sunshine Coast Falcons	Sunshine Coast Stadium	6-60	Nima	Boas 1/1	
Saturday, 20 July	Round 18	Easts Tigers	Aipus Oval, Wabag	38-38	Kawage, Yoka, Elison, Gotuno, Maki, Wapi, Nima	Boas 5/6 Hasu 0/1	
Saturday, 3 August	Round 19	Townsville Blackhawks	Jack Manski Oval	18-48	Hasu, Appo, Wapi	Boas 3/3	
Saturday, 10 August	Round 20	Burleigh Bears	National Football Stadium	6-24	Lo	Boas 1/1	
Saturday, 17 August	Round 21	Wynnum Manly Seagulls	BMD Kougari Oval	4-60	Rau		
Saturday, 24 August	Round 22	Redcliffe Dolphins	National Football Stadium	0-46			
Saturday, August 31	Round 23	Souths Logan Magpies	Davies Park	25-24	Wera, Gotuno, Paul, Rau, Meninga	Hasu 2/2 Boas drop goal	
Legend: Win Loss Draw Bye
