= 2017 Queensland Cup =

- Duration: March 4 – September 24, 2017
- Teams: 14
- Premiers: PNG Hunters (1st title)
- Minor premiers: PNG Hunters (1st title)
- Matches played: 167
- Points scored: 7,353
- Top points scorer: Carlin Anderson (220)
- Player of the year: Ase Boas (Courier Mail Medal)
- Top try-scorer: Jonathon Reuben (26)

The 2017 Queensland Cup season was the 22nd season of Queensland's top-level statewide rugby league competition run by the Queensland Rugby League in Australia. The competition, known as the Intrust Super Cup due to sponsorship from Intrust Super, featured 14 teams playing a 29-week long season (including finals) from March to September.

The Papua New Guinea Hunters won their first premiership after defeating the Sunshine Coast Falcons 12–10 in the Grand Final at Suncorp Stadium, becoming the first team from outside of Australia to win the Queensland Cup. Hunters' halfback Ase Boas was named the competition's Player of the Year, winning the Courier Mail Medal.

== Teams ==
In 2017, the lineup of teams remained unchanged for the third consecutive year.

Colours	Club	Home ground(s)	Head coach(s)	Captain(s)	NRL Affiliate
	Burleigh Bears	Pizzey Park	Jim Lenihan	Luke Page	Gold Coast Titans
	Central Queensland Capras	Browne Park	Kim Williams	Gavin Hiscox	None
	Easts Tigers	Suzuki Stadium	Scott Sipple	Jake Foster	Melbourne Storm
	Ipswich Jets	North Ipswich Reserve	Ben & Shane Walker	Dane Phillips	Brisbane Broncos
	Mackay Cutters	Stadium Mackay	Steve Sheppard	Andrew Davey & Setaimata Sa	North Queensland Cowboys
	Northern Pride	Barlow Park	Ty Williams	Ryan Ghietti	North Queensland Cowboys
	Norths Devils	Bishop Park	Mark Gliddon	Billy Brittain	Brisbane Broncos
	Papua New Guinea Hunters	National Football Stadium	Michael Marum	Ase Boas	None
	Redcliffe Dolphins	Dolphin Oval	Adam Mogg	Sam Anderson	Brisbane Broncos
	Souths Logan Magpies	Davies Park	Jon Buchanan	Phil Dennis	Brisbane Broncos
	Sunshine Coast Falcons	Sunshine Coast Stadium	Craig Ingebrigtsen	Dane Hogan	Melbourne Storm
	Townsville Blackhawks	Jack Manski Oval	Kristian Woolf	Dan Beasley	North Queensland Cowboys
	Tweed Heads Seagulls	Piggabeen Sports Complex	Aaron Zimmerle	Damian Sironen	Gold Coast Titans
	Wynnum Manly Seagulls	BMD Kougari Oval	Adam Brideson	Mitchell Frei	Brisbane Broncos

== Ladder ==
2017 Queensland Cup
Pos	Team	Pld	W	D	L	B	PF	PA	PD	Pts
1	Papua New Guinea Hunters (P)	23	17	1	5	2	550	378	+172	39
2	Redcliffe Dolphins	23	17	0	6	2	604	332	+272	38
3	Easts Tigers	23	16	1	6	2	596	422	+174	37
4	Sunshine Coast Falcons	23	15	1	7	2	645	418	+227	35
5	Souths Logan Magpies	23	15	0	8	2	580	484	+96	34
6	Townsville Blackhawks	23	12	2	9	2	575	473	+102	30
7	Ipswich Jets	23	12	0	11	2	536	539	-3	28
8	Mackay Cutters	23	10	2	11	2	531	566	-35	26
9	Burleigh Bears	23	10	0	13	2	466	510	-64	24
10	Wynnum Manly Seagulls	23	9	0	14	2	433	465	-32	22
11	Norths Devils	23	9	0	14	2	502	570	-68	22
12	Northern Pride	23	6	0	17	2	400	555	-155	16
13	Tweed Heads Seagulls	23	5	0	18	2	337	710	-373	14
14	Central Queensland Capras	23	4	1	18	2	416	729	-313	13

== Final series ==
Home	Score	Away	Match Information
Home	Score	Away	Date and Time (Local)	Venue
Elimination Finals
Sunshine Coast Falcons	26 – 18	Souths Logan Magpies	3 September 2017, 1:30pm	Sunshine Coast Stadium
Easts Tigers	20 – 16	Townsville Blackhawks	3 September 2017, 2:00pm	Suzuki Stadium
Major / Minor Semi-finals
Easts Tigers	22 – 26	Sunshine Coast Falcons	10 September 2017, 1:30pm	Suzuki Stadium
PNG Hunters	6 – 4	Redcliffe Dolphins	10 September 2017, 3:00pm	National Football Stadium
Preliminary Final
Redcliffe Dolphins	8 – 34	Sunshine Coast Falcons	17 September 2017, 2:30pm	Dolphin Oval
Grand Final
PNG Hunters	12 – 10	Sunshine Coast Falcons	24 September 2017, 3:25pm	Suncorp Stadium

Qualifying / Elimination Finals
3	Easts	20
6	Townsville	16
4	Sunshine Coast	26
5	Souths Logan	18

Major / Minor Semi-finals
1	PNG Hunters	6
2	Redcliffe	4
3	Easts	22
4	Sunshine Coast	26

Preliminary Final
2	Redcliffe	8
4	Sunshine Coast	34

Grand Final
1	PNG Hunters	12
4	Sunshine Coast	10

== Grand Final ==
Sunday, 24 September
3:25pm (AEST)

PNG Hunters	12 – 10	Sunshine Coast Falcons
Tries: Watson Boas 1 Willie Minoga 1 Goals: Ase Boas 2	1st: 0 - 10; 2nd: 12 - 0 Report	Tries: 1 Matt Soper-Lawler; 1 Joe Stimson; Goals: 1 Joe Stimson

Suncorp Stadium
Attendance: 11,260
Referee: Jarrod Cole, Nick Pelgrave
Player of the Match: Ase Boas (PNG Hunters)

PNG Hunters	Position	Sunshine Coast Falcons
1. Stargroth Amean	FB	1. Jahrome Hughes
22. Wawa Paul	WG	2. Matt Soper-Lawler
3. Bland Abavu	CE	3. Justin Olam
4. Adex Wera	CE	4. Chris Lewis
5. Butler Morris	WG	5. Jeremy Hawkins
6. Ase Boas (c)	FE	6. Scott Drinkwater
7. Watson Boas	HB	7. Ryley Jacks
8. Wellington Albert	PR	18. Tui Kamikamica
9. Wartovo Puara	HK	14. Brandon Smith
10. Stanton Albert	PR	10. Lachlan Timm
11. David Loko	SR	11. Dane Hogan (c)
12. Nixon Putt	SR	12. Joe Stimson
13. Moses Meninga	LK	13. Harrison Muller
14. Rhadley Brawa	Bench	15. Jon Grieve
15. Willie Minoga	Bench	16. Louis Geraghty
16. Enoch Maki	Bench	17. Jye Ballinger
17. Brandy Peter	Bench	21. Guy Hamilton
Michael Marum	Coach	Craig Ingebrigtsen

The PNG Hunters won their first minor premiership after finishing ahead of Redcliffe by a single point. After earning a bye in the first week of the finals, they defeated Redcliffe in the major semi final to qualify for their first Grand Final. Sunshine Coast had to earn their Grand Final spot the hard way, winning four straight games on route to the decider. In the first week, they eliminated Souths Logan and then upset the third-placed Easts Tigers in the semi-finals and the second-placed Dolphins in the preliminary final to qualify for their second Grand Final.

=== First half ===
The Sunshine Coast stunned the Hunters early in the first half, with winger Matt Soper-Lawler scoring in just the 2nd minute as the Falcons hunted another finals upset. Five minutes later they scored their second try when second rower Joe Stimson crossed in the 7th minute. That would be the end of the first half scoring, with the Hunters getting close to getting their first try in the 15th minute but were ruled back for a forward pass.

=== Second half ===
It took the Hunters just two minutes to record their first points of the game when halfback Watson Boas scored after a deflected kick and an error from the Falcons. The scoreline remained unchanged for the next 36 minutes as neither side could crack the others defence. Finally, in the 79th minute, Hunters' forward Willie Minoga became his side's hero, as he dived onto an Ase Boas' grubber to score the try that levelled the scores. After consulting with the video referee, the try was awarded and Ase Boas kicked the game-winning conversion from right in front to give the Hunters their first ever Queensland Cup premiership. Hunters' captain Ase Boas was awarded the Duncan Hall Medal for man of the match.

=== NRL State Championship ===
After winning the Grand Final, the PNG Hunters qualified for the NRL State Championship on NRL Grand Final day. They were defeated by the Penrith Panthers, the New South Wales Cup premiers, 18–42.

Sunday, 1 October
3:40pm (AEDT)

Penrith Panthers	42 – 18	Papua New Guinea Hunters
Tries: Tony Satini (9', 11', 16', 40') 4 Darren Nicholls (20') 1 Viliame Kikau (31') 1 Christian Crichton (38') 1 Maika Sivo (47') 1 Goals: Darren Nicholls 5/8 (13', 17', 22', 34', 39'); Sin Bin: Jarome Luai (68')	1st: 38 – 2; 2nd: 4 – 16	Tries: 1 (69') Adex Wera; 1 (72') Bland Abavu; 1 (77') Ase Boas; Goals: 3/4 Ase Boas (3' pen, 70', 77')

ANZ Stadium, Sydney
Referee: Jarrod Cole, Chris Treneman
Man-of-the-Match medal: Kaide Ellis

== Player statistics ==
The following statistics are as of the conclusion of the season (including finals).

=== Leading try scorers ===
Pos	Player	Team	Tries
1	Jonathon Reuben	Townsville Blackhawks	28
2	Michael Purcell	Ipswich Jets	23
3	Carlin Anderson	Townsville Blackhawks	20
4	Ken Tofilau	Central Queensland Capras	17
5	Stargroth Amean	PNG Hunters	16
5	Matt Soper-Lawler	Sunshine Coast Falcons	16
7	Justin Olam	Sunshine Coast Falcons	15
7	Jarrod McInally	Easts Tigers	15
9	Yamba Bowie	Mackay Cutters	14

=== Leading point scorers ===
Pos	Player	Team	T	G	FG	Pts
1	Carlin Anderson	Townsville Blackhawks	20	70	-	220
2	Ase Boas	PNG Hunters	10	87	-	214
3	Guy Hamilton	Sunshine Coast Falcons	8	89	3	213
4	Jamayne Isaako	Souths Logan Magpies	9	80	-	196
5	Billy Walters	Easts Tigers	10	51	-	142
6	Tyson Gamble	Redcliffe Dolphins	8	53	-	138
7	Wes Conlon	Ipswich Jets	7	52	-	132
8	Jonathon Reuben	Townsville Blackhawks	28	0	-	112
9	Josh Beehag	Redcliffe Dolphins	9	32	-	100
10	Tony Tumusa	Central Queensland Capras	9	29	-	94

== QRL awards ==
- Courier Mail Medal (Best and Fairest): Ase Boas ( PNG Hunters)
- Coach of the Year: Michael Marum ( Redcliffe Dolphins)
- Rookie of the Year: Brandon Smith ( Sunshine Coast Falcons)
- Representative Player of the Year: Nick Slyney ( Queensland Residents, Redcliffe Dolphins)
- XXXX People's Choice Award: Ase Boas ( PNG Hunters)

=== Team of the Year ===
Position	Nat	Winner	Club
Fullback	(New Zealand)	Jamayne Isaako	Souths Logan Magpies
Wing	(Australia)	Jonathon Reuben	Townsville Blackhawks
Centre	(Papua New Guinea)	Justin Olam	Sunshine Coast Falcons
Five-eighth	(Australia)	Billy Walters	Easts Tigers
Halfback	(Australia)	Brodie Croft	Easts Tigers
Prop	(Australia)	Matthew Lodge	Redcliffe Dolphins
Hooker	(Tonga)	Pat Politoni	Burleigh Bears
Second-row	(Australia)	Blake Leary	Townsville Blackhawks
Lock	(Australia)	Sam Anderson	Redcliffe Dolphins

== See also ==
- Queensland Cup
- Queensland Rugby League
