= 2016 PNG Hunters season =

- Queensland Cup rank: 4th

Team information
- CEO: Reatau Rau
- Coach: Michael Marum
- Captain: Adam Korave
- Stadium: National Football Stadium
← 2015	2017 →

The 2016 Intrust Super Cup was the PNG Hunters third season in the Queensland Cup.

== Season summary ==
=== 2016 squad ===
PNG Hunters
First team squad		Coaching staff
Adex Wera – FB, WG; Bland Abavu – WG; Justin Olam – CE; Butler Morris – CE; Wawa Paul – WG; Ase Boas – SO; Watson Boas – HB; Enoch Maki – PR; Wartovo Puara – HK; Henry Wan – PR; Philemon Kimisive – SR; Atte Bina Wabo – SR	Esau Siune – PR; Benjamin Hetra – PR; Edward Goma – PR; Stargroth Amean – SO; Ishmael Balkawa – WG; Thompson Teteh – CE; William Aquila – SR; Sailas Gahuna – WG; Nickson Borana – FB; Anderson Benford – LK; Warren Glare – HK	Head coach: Michael Marum; Assistant coaches: Nigel Hukula; Solomon Kuliniasi; Roger Laka; Legend: (c) Captain(s); (vc) Vice-captain(s); Updated: 14 December 2018; Source(s):

=== Losses ===
Player	Signed To	Until end of	Notes
Justin Olam	Melbourne Storm	2018	
