= 2017 Rugby League World Cup knockout stage =

Rugby tournament stage

The 2017 Rugby League World Cup knockout stage takes place after the group stage of the 2017 Rugby League World Cup and culminates in the 2017 Rugby League World Cup final. The quarter-finals consisted of eight teams; 1st, 2nd and 3rd from Group A and Group B, and the remaining two places were taken up by the winners of Group C and Group D.

== Bracket ==
Quarter-finals
17 November – Darwin
Australia	46
Samoa	0
18 November – Wellington
New Zealand	2
Fiji	4
18 November – Christchurch
Tonga	24
Lebanon	22
19 November – Melbourne
England	36
Papua New Guinea	6

Semi-finals
24 November – Brisbane
Australia	54
Fiji	6
25 November – Auckland
Tonga	18
England	20

Final
2 December – Brisbane
Australia	6
England	0

== Quarter-finals ==
=== Australia vs Samoa ===
17 November 2017
19:00 ACST (UTC+9:30)

Australia	46–0	Samoa
Tries: Holmes (9', 17', 51', 57', 74') 5 Morgan (31', 36') 2 Slater (24') 1 Goals: Smith 7/8 (10', 19', 26', 33', 38', 53', 58')	Report

Darwin Stadium, Darwin
Attendance: 13,473
Referee: Phil Bentham (England)
Player of the Match: Valentine Holmes (Australia)

Team lists:

FB	1	Billy Slater
WG	2	Dane Gagai
CE	3	Will Chambers
CE	4	Josh Dugan
WG	5	Valentine Holmes
FE	6	Michael Morgan
HB	7	Cooper Cronk
PR	8	Aaron Woods
HK	9	Cameron Smith (c)
PR	10	David Klemmer
SR	11	Boyd Cordner
SR	12	Matt Gillett
LK	13	Josh McGuire
Substitutes:
IC	14	Wade Graham
IC	15	Jordan McLean
IC	16	Reagan Campbell-Gillard
IC	17	Tyson Frizell
Coach:
(Australia) Mal Meninga

FB	1	Young Tonumaipea
WG	2	Matthew Wright
CE	3	Ricky Leutele
CE	4	Joseph Leilua
WG	5	Tim Lafai
FE	6	Jarome Luai
HB	7	Ben Roberts
PR	8	Junior Paulo
HK	9	Jazz Tevaga
PR	15	Bunty Afoa
SR	11	Josh Papalii
SR	12	Frank Pritchard (c)
LK	13	Leeson Ah Mau
Substitutes:
IC	10	Herman Ese’ese
IC	14	Fa'amanu Brown
IC	16	Suaia Matagi
IC	17	Joseph Paulo
Coach:
(Australia) Matt Parish

Notes:

- Valentine Holmes became the first player to score 5 tries in a World Cup match.

=== Tonga vs Lebanon ===
18 November 2017
17:00 NZDT (UTC+13)

Tonga	24–22	Lebanon
Tries: Fusitu'a (19', 33') 2 Lolohea (4') 1 Hopoate (23') 1 Goals: Hingano 4/5 (5', 24', 34', 53' pen)	Report	Tries: 2 (40', 69') Miski; 1 (9') Doueihi; 1 (30') Elias; Goals: 3/4 Moses (10', 31', 70')

Christchurch Stadium, Christchurch
Attendance: 8,309
Referee: Gerard Sutton (Australia)
Player of the Match: Mitchell Moses (Lebanon)

Team lists:

FB	1	William Hopoate
WG	2	Daniel Tupou
CE	3	Michael Jennings
CE	4	Konrad Hurrell
WG	5	David Fusitu'a
FE	6	Tuimoala Lolohea
HB	7	Mafoa'aeata Hingano
PR	8	Andrew Fifita
HK	9	Sione Katoa
PR	19	Joe Ofahengaue
SR	11	Manu Ma'u
SR	12	Sika Manu (c)
LK	13	Jason Taumalolo
Substitutes:
IC	14	Siliva Havili
IC	16	Tevita Pangai Junior
IC	17	Ben Murdoch-Masila
IC	18	Ukuma Ta'ai
Coach:
(Australia) Kristian Woolf

FB	1	Anthony Layoun
WG	2	Travis Robinson
CE	3	James Elias
CE	4	Adam Doueihi
WG	5	Abbas Miski
FE	6	Mitchell Moses
HB	7	Robbie Farah (c)
PR	8	Tim Mannah
HK	9	Michael Lichaa
PR	10	Alex Twal
SR	11	Nick Kassis
SR	12	Ahmad Ellaz
LK	14	Jamie Clark
Substitutes:
IC	13	Mitchell Mamary
IC	15	Ray Moujalli
IC	16	Elias Sukkar
IC	17	Jason Wehbe
Coach:
(Australia) Brad Fittler

=== New Zealand vs Fiji ===
18 November 2017
19:30 NZDT (UTC+13)

New Zealand	2–4	Fiji
Goals: Johnson 1/1 (45' pen)	Report	Goals: 1/1 Koroisau (15' pen); 1/1 Milne (62' pen)

Wellington Regional Stadium, Wellington
Attendance: 12,713
Referee: Matt Cecchin (Australia)
Player of the Match: Kevin Naiqama (Fiji)

Team lists:

FB	1	Roger Tuivasa-Sheck
WG	2	Dallin Watene-Zelezniak
CE	3	Dean Whare
CE	4	Brad Takairangi
WG	5	Jordan Rapana (yellow card) 47' to 57'
FE	6	Te Maire Martin
HB	7	Shaun Johnson
PR	8	Martin Taupau
HK	9	Danny Levi
PR	10	Jared Waerea-Hargreaves
SR	11	Simon Mannering
SR	12	Joseph Tapine
LK	13	Adam Blair (c)
Substitutes:
IC	14	Nelson Asofa-Solomona
IC	15	Russell Packer
IC	16	Isaac Liu
IC	17	Kodi Nikorima
Coach:
(New Zealand) David Kidwell

FB	1	Kevin Naiqama (c)
WG	2	Suliasi Vunivalu
CE	3	Taane Milne
CE	4	Akuila Uate
WG	5	Marcelo Montoya
FE	6	Jarryd Hayne
HB	7	Henry Raiwalui
PR	8	Ashton Sims
HK	9	Apisai Koroisau
PR	10	Eloni Vunakece
SR	11	Viliame Kikau
SR	12	Brayden Wiliame
LK	13	Tui Kamikamica
Substitutes:
IC	14	Joe Lovodua
IC	15	Jacob Saifiti
IC	16	Junior Roqica
IC	17	Ben Nakubuwai
Coach:
(Australia) Michael Potter

Notes:

- This was New Zealand's first loss in Wellington since 2007, when they lost to Australia 0-58.
- This match is only the second ever tryless World Cup match.
- The match equalled the record for the lowest-scoring World Cup match ever played, with only six points being scored, when Great Britain beat France 6–0 in 1970.
- Fiji's four points is the lowest score by a winning team in World Cup history.

=== England vs Papua New Guinea ===
19 November 2017
16:00 AEDT (UTC+11)

England	36–6	Papua New Guinea
Tries: McGillvary (13', 20') 2 Watkins (68', 72') 2 Walmsley (33') 1 Currie (56') 1 Hall (79') 1 Goals: Widdop 4/7 (34', 57', 69', 80')	Report	Tries: 1 (60') Lo; Goals: 1/1 Martin (61')

Melbourne Rectangular Stadium, Melbourne
Attendance: 10,563
Referee: James Child (England)
Player of the Match: Jermaine McGillvary (England)

Team lists:

FB	1	Gareth Widdop
WG	2	Jermaine McGillvary
CE	3	Kallum Watkins
CE	4	John Bateman
WG	5	Ryan Hall
FE	6	Kevin Brown
HB	7	Luke Gale
PR	8	Chris Hill
HK	9	Josh Hodgson
PR	10	James Graham
SR	11	Sam Burgess
SR	12	Elliott Whitehead
LK	13	Sean O'Loughlin (c)
Substitutes:
IC	14	Alex Walmsley
IC	15	Thomas Burgess
IC	16	Ben Currie
IC	17	James Roby
Coach:
(Australia) Wayne Bennett

FB	1	David Mead (c)
RW	2	Justin Olam
RC	3	Kato Ottio
LC	4	Nene Macdonald
LW	5	Garry Lo
FE	6	Ase Boas
HB	7	Watson Boas
PR	8	Moses Meninga
HK	9	James Segeyaro
PR	10	Luke Page
SR	11	Rhyse Martin
SR	12	Willie Minoga
LK	13	Paul Aiton
Substitutes:
IC	14	Kurt Baptiste
IC	15	Stargroth Amean
IC	16	Stanton Albert
IC	17	Rod Griffin
Coach:
(Papua New Guinea) Michael Marum

== Semi-finals ==
=== Australia vs Fiji ===
24 November 2017
19:00 AEDT (UTC+10)

Australia	54–6	Fiji
Tries: Holmes (18', 24', 42', 51', 65', 75') 6 Gagai (31', 69') 2 Slater (14', 48') 2 Goals: Smith 7/10 (15', 19', 33', 43', 49', 53', 67')	Report	Tries: 1 (59') Vunivalu; Goals: 1/2 Koroisau (7' pen)

Brisbane Stadium, Brisbane
Attendance: 22,073
Referee: Gerard Sutton (Australia)
Player of the Match: Cameron Smith (Australia)

Team lists:

FB	1	Billy Slater
WG	2	Dane Gagai
CE	3	Will Chambers
CE	4	Josh Dugan
WG	5	Valentine Holmes
FE	6	Michael Morgan
HB	7	Cooper Cronk
PR	8	Aaron Woods
HK	9	Cameron Smith (c)
PR	10	David Klemmer
SR	11	Boyd Cordner
SR	12	Matt Gillett
LK	13	Josh McGuire
Substitutes:
IC	14	Wade Graham
IC	15	Jordan McLean
IC	16	Reagan Campbell-Gillard
IC	17	Tyson Frizell
Coach:
(Australia) Mal Meninga

FB	1	Kevin Naiqama (c)
WG	2	Suliasi Vunivalu
CE	3	Taane Milne
CE	4	Akuila Uate
WG	5	Marcelo Montoya
FE	6	Jarryd Hayne
HB	7	Henry Raiwalui
PR	8	Ashton Sims
HK	9	Apisai Koroisau
PR	10	Eloni Vunakece
SR	11	Viliame Kikau
SR	12	Brayden Wiliame
LK	13	Tui Kamikamica
Substitutes:
IC	14	Joe Lovodua
IC	15	Jacob Saifiti
IC	16	Junior Roqica
IC	17	Ben Nakubuwai
Coach:
(Australia) Michael Potter

Notes:

- Valentine Holmes broke his own record by becoming the first player to score 6 tries in a World Cup match.

=== Tonga vs England ===
25 November 2017
18:00 NZDT (UTC+13)

Tonga	18–20	England
Tries: Pangai Junior (73') 1 Havili (76') 1 Lolohea (77') 1 Goals: Taukeiaho 3/3 (73', 76, 77')	Report	Tries: 1 (11') McGillvary; 1 (16') Widdop; 1 (68') Bateman; Goals: 4/4 Widdop (12, 17, 50 pen, 69)

Mt Smart Stadium, Auckland
Attendance: 30,003
Referee: Matt Cecchin (Australia)
Player of the Match: Gareth Widdop (England)

Team lists:

FB	1	William Hopoate
WG	2	Daniel Tupou
CE	3	Michael Jennings
CE	4	Konrad Hurrell
WG	5	David Fusitu'a
FE	6	Tuimoala Lolohea
HB	7	Mafoa'aeata Hingano
PR	8	Andrew Fifita
HK	9	Siliva Havili
PR	10	Sio Siua Taukeiaho
SR	11	Manu Ma'u
SR	12	Sika Manu (c)
LK	13	Jason Taumalolo
Substitutes:
IC	14	Sione Katoa
IC	15	Peni Terepo
IC	16	Tevita Pangai Junior
IC	17	Ben Murdoch-Masila
Coach:
(Australia) Kristian Woolf

FB	1	Gareth Widdop
WG	2	Jermaine McGillvary
CE	3	Kallum Watkins
CE	4	John Bateman
WG	5	Ryan Hall
FE	6	Kevin Brown
HB	7	Luke Gale
PR	8	Chris Hill
HK	9	Josh Hodgson
PR	10	James Graham
SR	11	Sam Burgess
SR	12	Elliott Whitehead
LK	13	Sean O'Loughlin (c)
Substitutes:
IC	14	Alex Walmsley
IC	15	Thomas Burgess
IC	16	Ben Currie
IC	17	James Roby
Coach:
(Australia) Wayne Bennett

== Final: Australia vs England ==
2 December 2017
19:00 AEST (UTC+10)

Australia	6–0	England
Tries: Cordner (15') 1 Goals: Smith 1/1 (16')	Report

Brisbane Stadium, Brisbane
Attendance: 40,033
Referee: Gerard Sutton (Australia)
Player of the Match: Boyd Cordner (Australia)

Team lists:

FB	1	Billy Slater
WG	2	Dane Gagai
CE	3	Will Chambers
CE	4	Josh Dugan
WG	5	Valentine Holmes
FE	6	Michael Morgan
HB	7	Cooper Cronk
PR	8	Aaron Woods
HK	9	Cameron Smith (c)
PR	10	David Klemmer
SR	11	Boyd Cordner
SR	12	Matt Gillett
LK	13	Josh McGuire
Substitutes:
IC	14	Wade Graham
IC	15	Jordan McLean
IC	16	Reagan Campbell-Gillard
IC	17	Tyson Frizell
Coach:
(Australia) Mal Meninga

FB	1	Gareth Widdop
WG	2	Jermaine McGillvary
CE	3	Kallum Watkins
CE	4	John Bateman
WG	5	Ryan Hall
FE	6	Kevin Brown
HB	7	Luke Gale
PR	8	Chris Hill
HK	9	James Roby
PR	10	James Graham
SR	11	Ben Currie
SR	12	Elliott Whitehead
LK	16	Sam Burgess (c)
Substitutes:
IC	14	Alex Walmsley
IC	15	Thomas Burgess
IC	17	Chris Heighington
IC	18	Jonny Lomax^{1}
Coach:
(Australia) Wayne Bennett

^{1} - Sean O'Loughlin was originally selected to play but withdrew due to a quad injury. He was replaced by Sam Burgess whilst Ben Currie filled Burgess's spot in the second row, and Jonny Lomax filled Currie's spot on the bench.

Notes:

- Australia became the first team to win the Rugby League World Cup title eleven times.
- This was the first time a team won the World Cup on home soil since 1977.
- The aggregate 6 points scored was the least in a Rugby League World Cup final.
- This match saw a new equal record low for tries in a Rugby League World Cup final with only one try scored.
