= 2017 Rugby League World Cup Group C =

2017 Rugby League World Cup Group C was one of four groups in the 2017 Rugby League World Cup. The group comprised Papua New Guinea, Wales and Ireland. Papua New Guinea topped the group and therefore qualified for the 2017 Rugby League World Cup knockout stage.

== Overall ==
Key to colours in pool tables
Advances to knockout stage and qualifies for the 2021 Rugby League World Cup

Pos	Team	Pld	W	D	L	PF	PA	PD	Pts	Qualification
1	Papua New Guinea (H)	3	3	0	0	128	12	+116	6	Advance to knockout stage
2	Ireland	3	2	0	1	76	32	+44	4	
3	Wales	3	0	0	3	18	156	−138	0	

(H) Hosts

== Papua New Guinea vs Wales ==
28 October 2017
15:00 AEDT (UTC+10)

Papua New Guinea	50–6	Wales
Tries: David Mead (5', 10', 60') 3 Rhyse Martin (43', 53') 2 Nene Macdonald (23') 1 Kato Ottio (34') 1 Wellington Albert (38') 1 Justin Olam (56') 1 Paul Aiton (71') 1 Goals: Rhyse Martin 5/8 (24', 36', 39', 44', 72'); Ase Boas 0/2	Report	Tries: 1 (80') Regan Grace; Goals: 1/1 Courtney Davies (80')

National Football Stadium, Port Moresby
Attendance: 14,800
Referee: Ben Cummins (Australia)
Player of the Match: David Mead (Papua New Guinea)

Team lists:

FB	1	David Mead (c)
RW	2	Justin Olam
RC	3	Kato Ottio
LC	4	Nene Macdonald
LW	5	Garry Lo
FE	6	Ase Boas
HB	7	Watson Boas
PR	8	Stanton Albert
HK	9	Wartovo Puara
PR	10	Luke Page
SR	11	Rhyse Martin
SR	12	Willie Minoga
LK	13	Paul Aiton
Substitutes:
IC	14	Kurt Baptiste
IC	15	Wellington Albert
IC	16	James Segeyaro
IC	17	Enoch Maki
Coach:
Michael Marum

FB	1	Elliot Kear
RW	2	Rhys Williams
RC	3	Michael Channing
LC	4	Andrew Gay
LW	5	Regan Grace
FE	6	Courtney Davies
HB	7	Matt Seamark
PR	8	Craig Kopczak (c)
HK	9	Steve Parry
PR	10	Phil Joseph
SR	11	Rhodri Lloyd
SR	17	Chester Butler
LK	13	Morgan Knowles
Substitutes:
IC	12	Ben Morris
IC	14	Matty Fozard
IC	15	Sam Hopkins
IC	16	Ben Evans
Coach:
John Kear

== Papua New Guinea vs Ireland ==
5 November 2017
16:00 AEDT (UTC+10)

Papua New Guinea	14–6	Ireland
Tries: Garry Lo (16') 1 Nene Macdonald (26') 1 Watson Boas (78') 1 Goals: Ase Boas 1/1 (79'); Rhyse Martin 0/2	Report	Tries: 1 (5') Michael McIlorum; Goals: 1/1 Liam Finn (6')

National Football Stadium, Port Moresby
Attendance: 14,800
Referee: Matt Cecchin (Australia)
Player of the Match: Garry Lo (Papua New Guinea)

Team lists:

FB	1	David Mead (c)
RW	2	Justin Olam
RC	3	Kato Ottio
LC	4	Nene Macdonald
LW	5	Garry Lo
FE	6	Ase Boas
HB	7	Watson Boas
PR	8	Stanton Albert
HK	9	Kurt Baptiste
PR	10	Luke Page
SR	11	Rhyse Martin
SR	12	Willie Minoga
LK	13	Paul Aiton
Substitutes:
IC	14	James Segeyaro
IC	15	Wellington Albert
IC	16	Stargroth Amean
IC	17	Enoch Maki
Coach:
Michael Marum

FB	1	Scott Grix
WG	2	Shannon McDonnell
CE	3	Ed Chamberlain
CE	4	Michael Morgan
WG	5	Liam Kay
FE	6	Api Pewhairangi
HB	7	Liam Finn (c)
PR	8	Brad Singleton
HK	9	Michael McIlorum
PR	10	Kyle Amor
SR	11	Louie McCarthy-Scarsbrook
SR	12	Oliver Roberts
LK	13	George King
Substitutes:
IC	14	Tyrone McCarthy
IC	15	James Hasson
IC	16	Joe Philbin
IC	17	Anthony Mullally
Coach:
Mark Aston

== Wales vs Ireland ==
12 November 2017
15:30 AWST (UTC+8)

Wales	6–34	Ireland
Tries: Ben Morris (57') 1 Goals: Courtney Davies 1/1 (59')	Report	Tries: 2 (34', 66') Oliver Roberts; 1 (8') Api Pewhairangi; 1 (34') Joe Philbin; 1 (39') Liam Finn; 1 (74') Liam Kay; Goals: 5/6 Liam Finn (9', 32', 35', 67', 76')

Perth Rectangular Stadium, Perth
Attendance: 14,744
Referee: Ben Thaler (England)
Player of the Match: Oliver Roberts (Ireland)

Team lists:

FB	1	Elliot Kear
RW	2	Rhys Williams
RC	3	Michael Channing
LC	17	Ben Morris
LW	5	Regan Grace
FE	6	Courtney Davies
HB	23	Josh Ralph
PR	8	Craig Kopczak (c)
HK	14	Steve Parry
PR	16	Ben Evans
SR	9	Matty Fozard
SR	13	Morgan Knowles
LK	10	Phil Joseph
Substitutes:
IC	11	Rhodri Lloyd
IC	12	Joe Burke
IC	15	Gavin Bennion
IC	18	Andrew Gay
Coach:
John Kear

FB	1	Scott Grix
WG	2	Shannon McDonnell
CE	3	Ed Chamberlain
CE	4	Api Pewhairangi
WG	5	Liam Kay
FE	6	Joe Keyes
HB	7	Liam Finn (c)
PR	8	Anthony Mullally
HK	9	Michael McIlorum
PR	10	Kyle Amor
SR	11	Louie McCarthy-Scarsbrook
SR	15	Will Hope
LK	13	Brad Singleton
Substitutes:
IC	12	Oliver Roberts
IC	14	George King
IC	16	Joe Philbin
IC	17	Matty Hadden
Coach:
Mark Aston
