= 2015 PNG Hunters season =

- Queensland Cup rank: 2nd

Team information
- CEO: Reatau Rau
- Coach: Michael Marum
- Captain: Israel Eliab
- Stadium: Kalabond Oval
← 2014	2016 →

The 2015 Intrust Super Cup was the PNG Hunters second season in the Queensland Cup.

== Season summary ==
For their second campaign the squad changed very little. The major losses were Garry Lo, David Loko and Joe Bruno who joined the coaching staff following his retirement. The main gains being Kato Ottio and Nickson Borana. The season began with the Hunters losing 3 of their opening 6 fixtures, but they then went on an unbeaten run of 17 games to the end of the regular season securing second place in the league, missing out on top spot by 1 point. Ipswich Jets ended their season in the preliminary final. Off the field Head Coach Michael Marum was voted coach of the year, and during the season CEO Brad Tassell was forced to resign.

=== 2015 squad ===
PNG Hunters
First team squad		Coaching staff
Adex Wera – FB, WG; George Benson – WG; Thompson Teteh – CE; Israel Eliab – CE; Butler Morris – WG; Noel Zeming – SO; Roger Laka – HB; Enoch Maki – PR; Wartovo Puara – HK; Willie Minoga – PR	Noel Joel – PR; Timothy Lomai – PR; Brandy Peter – SO; Adam Korave – WG; Edward Goma – SR; Esau Siune – PR; David Loko – LK; Ase Boas – SO; Lawrence Tu'u – SR; Sebastien Pandia – SR	Head coach: Michael Marum; Assistant coaches: Nigel Hukula; Solomon Kuliniasi; Roger Laka; Legend: (c) Captain(s); (vc) Vice-captain(s); Updated: 14 December 2018; Source(s):

== Squad movement ==
=== Losses ===
Player	Signed To	Until end of	Notes
Kato Ottio	Canberra Raiders	2017	
Sebastien Pandia	Ipswich Jets	2018	
Israel Eliab	London Broncos	2016	
Willie Minoga	Townsville Blackhawks	2016	
