= 2017 NSW Cup season =

2017 Intrust Super Premiership NSW
- League: NSW Cup
- Duration: 25 Rounds
- Teams: 12
- Broadcast partners: Fox League

2017 season
- Premiers: Penrith Panthers
- Minor Premiers: Wyong Roos

The 2017 New South Wales Cup season was the tenth season of the New South Wales Cup administered by the New South Wales Rugby League, and the second known as the Intrust Super Premiership NSW due sponsorship reasons. The competition acts as a second-tier league to the ten New South Wales-based National Rugby League clubs, as well the Canberra Raiders and New Zealand Warriors.

The winner of the Premiership will compete against the winner of the 2017 Queensland Cup in the 2017 NRL State Championship. Illawarra RLFC are the defending champions, following their 21–20 victory against the Mounties in the 2016 grand final.

A NSW Residents side, selected from the Premiership, lost 6–36 to the Queensland Residents on 7 May.

== Teams ==
In 2017, 12 clubs fielded teams in the Intrust Super Premiership. The Blacktown Workers Sea Eagles replaced the Manly Sea Eagles. The Illawarra Cutters were renamed as the Illawarra RLFC.

A team from Fiji applied to enter the competition, gaining support from Petero Civoniceva and the Fijian government, but the NSWRL board determined that they were not ready for the 2017 season. The team would have played from the 15,000-capacity National Stadium, Suva.

Pat Weisner started the season as coach of the Blacktown Workers Sea Eagles, before being fired and replaced by Steven Hales. The Bulldogs named Ray Moujalli as their captain.

Colors	Club	Coach	Stadium	Founded	Joined*	NRL affiliate
	Blacktown Workers Sea Eagles	Steven Hales; ~~Pat Weisner~~	HE Laybutt Field, Blacktown	1962	2017	Manly-Warringah Sea Eagles
	Canterbury-Bankstown Bulldogs	Steve Georgallis	Belmore Sports Ground, Belmore	1934	2008	Canterbury-Bankstown Bulldogs
	Illawarra RLFC	Matthew Head	Wollongong Showground, Wollongong	2012	2012	St George Illawarra Dragons
	Mount Pritchard Mounties	Steve Antonelli	Mount Pritchard Oval, Mount Pritchard	2012	2012	Canberra Raiders
	Newcastle Knights	Simon Woolford	Hunter Stadium, Newcastle	1988	2012	Newcastle Knights
	Newtown Jets	Greg Matterson	Henson Park, Marrickville	1908	2008	Cronulla Sharks
	New Zealand Warriors	Ricky Henry	Mount Smart Stadium, Auckland	2007	2014	New Zealand Warriors
	North Sydney Bears	Ben Gardiner	North Sydney Oval, North Sydney	1908	2008	South Sydney Rabbitohs
	Penrith Panthers	Garth Brennan	Penrith Stadium, Penrith	1966	2008	Penrith Panthers
	Wentworthville Magpies	Nathan Cayless	Ringrose Park, Wentworthville	1963	2008	Parramatta Eels
	Wests Tigers	David Heath	Campbelltown Stadium, Campbelltown; Leichhardt Oval, Leichhardt	1999	2013	Wests Tigers
	Wyong Roos	Rip Taylor	Morrie Breen Oval, Kanwal	1910	2013	Sydney Roosters

*: The season the team joined is in the NSW Cup, not any other competition before this.

== Ladder ==
2017 New South Wales Cup
	Team	Pld	W	D	L	B	PF	PA	PD	Pts
1	Wyong Roos	16	13	1	1	1	454	252	+202	29
2	New Zealand Warriors	16	9	3	3	1	376	274	+102	23
3	Penrith Panthers	17	8	1	6	2	339	230	+109	21
4	Mount Pritchard Mounties	16	8	1	6	1	336	330	+6	19
5	Canterbury-Bankstown Bulldogs	16	7	2	6	1	304	254	+15	18
6	North Sydney Bears	17	7	0	8	2	241	259	−18	18
7	Illawarra RLFC	16	7	0	8	1	310	372	−62	16
8	Newcastle Knights	16	5	1	8	2	302	388	−86	15
9	Wentworthville Magpies	16	6	0	9	1	331	307	+24	14
10	Blacktown Workers Sea Eagles	16	5	0	9	2	306	368	−62	14
11	Newtown Jets	16	5	1	9	1	290	365	−75	13
12	Wests Tigers	16	4	0	11	1	252	442	−190	10

== Finals ==
Qualifying and elimination finals
Sydney Football Stadium
1	Wyong	34
4	Canterbury	26
Jubilee Oval
5	Mount Pritchard	26
8	Illawarra	30
Jubilee Oval
6	North Sydney	18
7	Newcastle	40
Jubilee Oval
2	New Zealand	20
3	Penrith	36

Semi-finals
Jubilee Oval
Canterbury-Bankstown	32
Illawarra	14
Jubilee Oval
New Zealand	30
Newcastle	6

Preliminary finals
Leichhardt Oval
Wyong	16
New Zealand	12
Leichhardt Oval
Penrith	16
Canterbury-Bankstown	12

Grand final
Leichhardt Oval
Wyong	12
Penrith	20

=== Grand Final ===
24 September
6:45 (AEST)

Wyong Roos	12-20	Penrith Panthers

Leichhardt Oval, Sydney
Attendance: 2,000

FB	1	Luke Sharpe
WG	2	Johnny Tuivasa-Sheck
CE	3	Paul Momirovski
CE	4	Joseph Manu
WG	5	Chris Centrone
FE	6	Jayden Nikorima
HB	7	Mitch Cornish
PR	8	Lindsay Collins
HK	9	Mitchell Williams (c)
PR	14	Eloni Vunakece
SR	11	Brock Gray
SR	12	Justin Toomey-White
LK	13	Nat Butcher
Interchange:
BE	10	Chris Smith
BE	15	Grant Garvey
BE	16	Jake Lewis
BE	17	Brenden Santi
Coach:
Rip Taylor

FB	1	Mason Cerruto
WG	2	Maika Sivo
CE	3	Jed Cartwright
CE	4	Tony Satini
WG	5	Christian Crichton
FE	6	Jarome Luai
HB	7	Darren Nicholls (c)
PR	8	Kaide Ellis
HK	9	Mitch Rein
PR	10	Sitaleki Akauola
SR	11	Viliame Kikau
SR	20	Moses Leota
LK	19	Sione Katoa
Interchange:
BE	12	Corey Waddell
BE	14	Tom Eisenhuth
BE	15	Oliver Clark
BE	16	Nick Tui-Loso
Coach:
Garth Brennan

== NRL State Championship ==
As premiers of the NSW Cup, the Penrith Panthers faced Queensland Cup premiers Papua New Guinea Hunters in the annual NRL State Championship match.

Sunday, 1 October
3:40pm (AEDT)

Penrith Panthers	42 – 18	Papua New Guinea Hunters
Tries: Tony Satini (9', 11', 16', 40') 4 Darren Nicholls (20') 1 Viliame Kikau (31') 1 Christian Crichton (38') 1 Maika Sivo (47') 1 Goals: Darren Nicholls 5/8 (13', 17', 22', 34', 39'); Sin Bin: Jarome Luai (68')	1st: 38 – 2; 2nd: 4 – 16	Tries: 1 (69') Adex Wera; 1 (72') Bland Abavu; 1 (77') Ase Boas; Goals: 3/4 Ase Boas (3' pen, 70', 77')

ANZ Stadium, Sydney
Referee: Jarrod Cole, Chris Treneman
Man-of-the-Match medal: Kaide Ellis
