= 2017 Rugby League World Cup final =

Australia	England
(ARL)	(RFL)
6	0
	1	2	Total
AUS	6	0	6
ENG	0	0	0
- Date: 2 December 2017
- Stadium: Brisbane Stadium
- Location: Brisbane, Australia
- Man of the Match: Boyd Cordner (Australia)
- Australian National Anthem: Scott Muller
- English National Anthem: Amber Dawn-Finch
- Referee: Gerard Sutton (Australia)
- Attendance: 40,033

Broadcast partners
- Broadcasters: Seven Network (Australia) BBC (UK)
- Commentators: Jim Wilson (Host) Mark Braybrook (Lead Caller) Gary Belcher (Commentator) Brett Kimmorley (Sideline) Laurie Daley (Analysis) Benji Marshall (Analysis) Mark Geyer (Analysis)

The 2017 Rugby League World Cup final was a rugby league match to determine the winner of the 2017 Rugby League World Cup, played between reigning champions Australia and their rivals England on 2 December 2017 at Brisbane Stadium in Brisbane, immediately after the final of the concurrent women's competition.

== Background ==
Australia became the winners of the Rugby League World Cup for a record eleventh time, beating England 6–0 to retain the Paul Barrière Trophy and become the first team since 1977 to win the World Cup on home soil. This match saw a new equal record low for tries in a Rugby League World Cup final with only one try scored, equaling the one try scored in the 1992 final. It also saw the lowest combined score for a final of 6, which was also previously held by the 1992 final where only 16 points was scored. It was the first time in 22 years since England had played in a World Cup final, when they lost to Australia 8–16 in the 1995 Rugby League World Cup final at Wembley Stadium.

== Venue ==
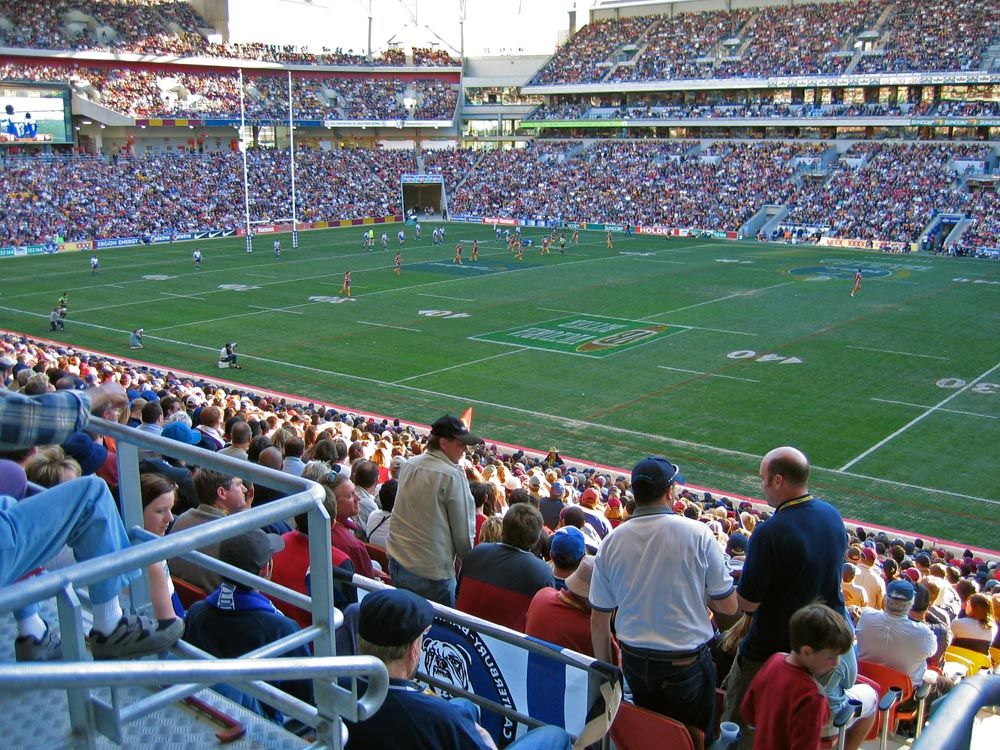
Brisbane Stadium hosted the match

On 19 February 2014, it was announced that the joint bid from Australia and New Zealand had won hosting rights for the World Cup and that Brisbane Stadium, commonly known as Lang Park, would host the final.

The ground comprises a three-tiered rectangular sporting stadium with a capacity of 52,500 people. and is commonly known as the traditional home of rugby league in Brisbane. The stadium is also used for rugby union and soccer and has a rectangular playing field of 136 by 82 metres (446 by 269 ft).

2017 was the second time the stadium had hosted the World Cup final, with Brisbane previously hosting the final of the 2008 tournament, in which New Zealand defeated hosts Australia 34–20.

== Route to the final ==
=== Summary ===
Australia		Round	England	
Opponent	Result	Group stage	Opponent	Result
England	18–4	Matchday 1	Australia	4–18
France	52–6	Matchday 2	Lebanon	29–10
Lebanon	34–0	Matchday 3	France	36–6
Group stage winners: Pos / Team / Pld / Pts; 1 / Australia (H) / 3 / 6; 2 / England / 3 / 4; 3 / Lebanon / 3 / 2; 4 / France / 3 / 0; Source: (H) Hosts		Final standings	Group stage runners-up: Pos / Team / Pld / Pts; 1 / Australia (H) / 3 / 6; 2 / England / 3 / 4; 3 / Lebanon / 3 / 2; 4 / France / 3 / 0; Source: (H) Hosts	
Opponent	Result	Knockout stage	Opponent	Result
Samoa	46–0	Quarter-finals	Papua New Guinea	36–6
Fiji	54–6	Semi-finals	Tonga	20–18

=== Australia ===
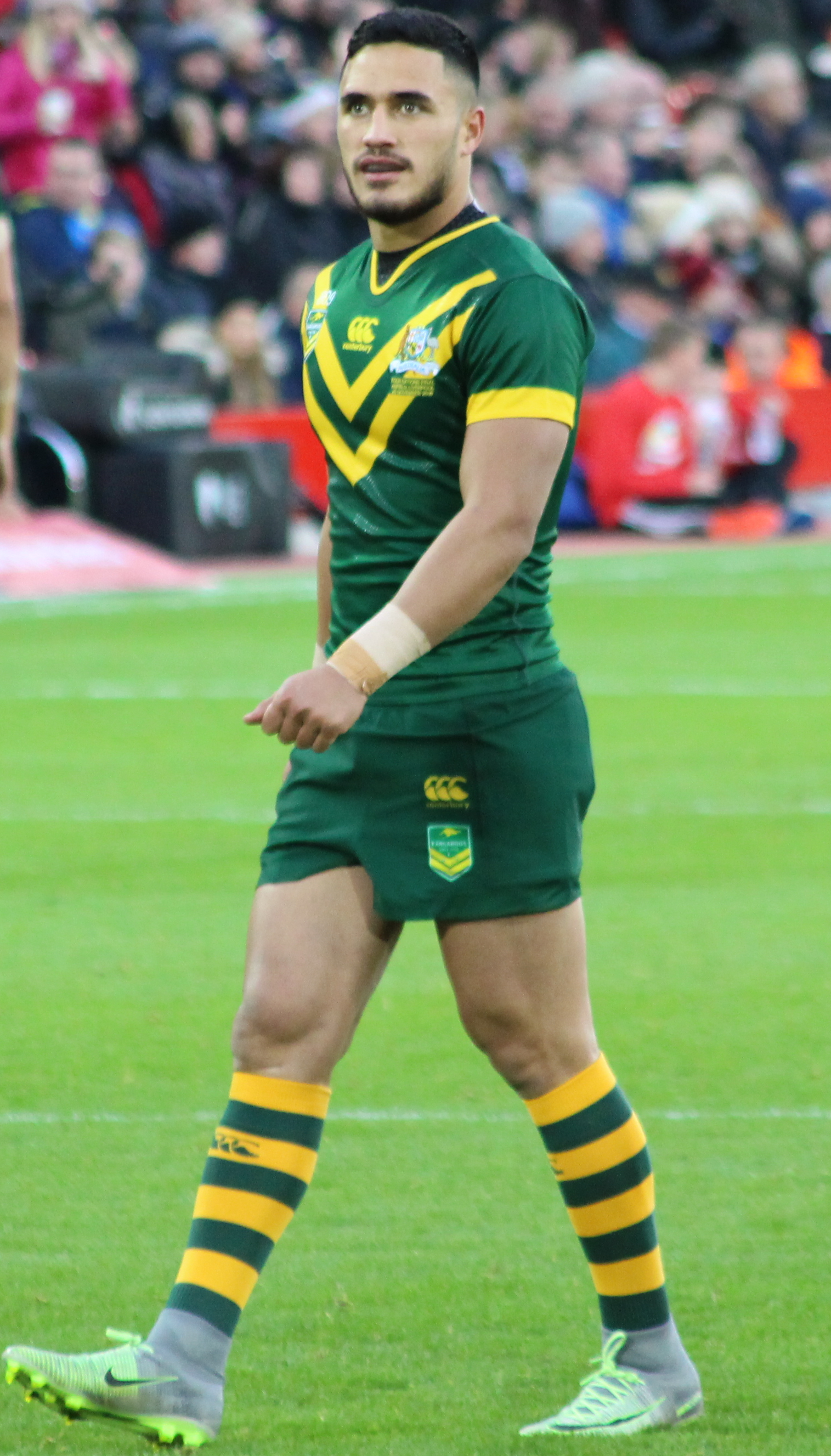
Valentine Holmes scored a record twelve tries in Australia's progress to the final.

Australia's road to the final began on October 27 at Melbourne Rectangular Stadium in Melbourne, where they played England. After conceding the first try Australia didn't concede for the rest of the match and went on the win 18–4.

Australia's next game was in Canberra against France. Australia jumped out to an early 12–0 lead through a Wade Graham double before French fullback Mark Kheirallah fielded an Australian kick and ran 80 meters to score under the posts and make it 12–6. Wade Graham went on to score 4 tries as Australia ran out 52–6 winners.

The Kangaroos' final group match was in Sydney against Lebanon. Australia put on a very controlled and professional performance to win comfortably, 34–0.

Australia would face the win-less Samoa in the first test match in Darwin to open the quarter-finals. Australian winger Valentine Holmes became the first ever player to score 5 tries in a World Cup match as Australia won 46–0.

Australia then moved on to Brisbane to play an undefeated Fiji in the first semi-final. Australian winger Valentine Holmes this time scored 6 tries and broke his own record for the most tries in a World Cup match, and also took his tournament tally to 12 thus becoming the highest tally in a single World Cup. Australia went on to beat Fiji 54–6 and qualified for their 12th World Cup final.

=== England ===
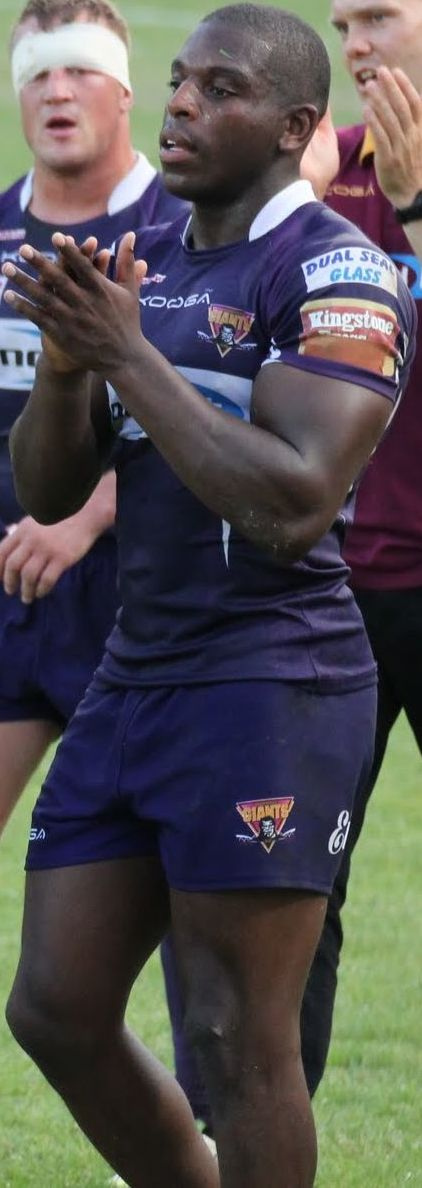
Jermaine McGillvary ran a tournament high 1251 metres in the lead up to the final.

England began their World Cup campaign against Australia on October 27 at Melbourne Rectangular Stadium in Melbourne. England opened the scoring with winger Jermaine McGillvary crossing in the 5th minute, taking an early 4–0 lead. England then conceded two tries to trail 4–10 at half time. The second half was very evenly matched with both teams having chances to score, until a Cameron Smith penalty goal in the 76th minute extended Australia's lead over a converted try, and conceding a 79th minute intercept try to Josh Dugan sealed an England's first defeat of the tournament, going down 4–18.

England's second match of the tournament came against Lebanon in Sydney. A first half blitz saw England take a 22–6 half time lead, with tries to Kallum Watkins, Jermaine McGillvary, Ryan Hall and Ben Currie. A more conservative second half saw England only score and conceded one try, and seal a 29–10 victory with a last minute field goal by Gareth Widdop. Much controversy surrounded an incident in the second half where Lebanon captain Robbie Farah accused England's Jermaine McGillvary of biting during a tackle. McGillvary was not suspended due to no evidence that he bit Farah.

England's final group match came against France in Perth. England got off to a fast start, scoring 3 tries in the first nine minutes, taking a 26–6 half time lead. Much alike their previous group match against Lebanon, England took their foot off the pedal in the second half, only scoring two more tries, going out victorious 36–6 and booking their place in the knockout stage.

England faced the winners of Group C, Papua New Guinea in their quarter final clash in Melbourne. Much a-like their group stage matches, England were the first team to score, taking a 14–0 lead into half time. A Ben Currie try in the 56th minute almost certainly booked England a semi final berth until Garry Lo got PNG's first try and set up an exciting last 20 minutes, until 3 tries in the last 12 minutes saw England run out 36–6 victors.

England then face a passionate Tongan team in the semi-finals in Auckland. England opened the scoring through a try to winger Jermaine McGillvary, scoring his seventh of the tournament. Five minutes later Gareth Widdop took the lead out to 12–0, a lead which England took into half time. A 50th-minute penalty goal took England out past a 2 converted try lead and a 68th minute try to John Bateman all but looked to seal England's first World Cup final berth since 1995, but three tries in 4 minutes to Tonga closed England's lead to two points with 3 minutes left. The ending of the match was very controversial, with Tonga's Andrew Fafita crossing the line in the dying seconds for referee Matt Cecchin to rule a knock-on against the Tongans. Replays showed that the knock-on may have been a result due to a strip from England, but Cecchin failed to review the possible try and thus awarding England a 20–18 semi final win, and advancing to the final to face Australia, who they faced in their opening group match.

== Pre-match ==
=== Officiating ===
Gerard Sutton was named to officiate the match with Chris Kendall from the Rugby Football League and Chris Butler to be the touch judges. Ben Thaler was the video referee, and Matt Cecchin and Robert Hicks were the standy-by referee and touch judges respectively.

=== Team selection ===
Sean O'Loughlin was originally selected to play for England but withdrew due to a quad injury. He was replaced by Sam Burgess whilst Ben Currie filled Burgess's spot in the second row, and Jonny Lomax filled Currie's spot on the bench.

Australia was unchanged for the final from their semi-final victory over Fiji.

=== Women's final ===
The match was played as a double-header with the women's final between Australia and New Zealand. Australia won 23–16, retaining their 2013 title and their second overall.

=== Entertainment ===
Injured Australian five-eighth Johnathan Thurston and English rugby league icon Kevin Sinfield presented the teams onto the field. Amber Dawn-Finch sang God Save the Queen for the English, and tenor Scott Muller sang Advance Australia Fair for the Australians.

== Match ==
=== First half ===
Boyd Cordner scored the first try in the 15th minute for Australia, and Cameron Smith converted.

After the first 40 minutes, Australia went into half-time with a 6–0 lead.

=== Second half ===
In the 47th minute, Michael Morgan appeared to have scored a try, but was ruled no try when referred to the video referee due to ruled interference, resulting in a penalty to England.

In the 65th minute, English centre Kallum Watkins broke the Australian line causing an 2-on-1 overlap with Elliott Whitehead unmarked, but was ankle-tapped by Australia's Josh Dugan which ended up being a match-winning moment for the Kangaroos.

The second half ended up being a scoreless affair for both sides; after 80 minutes Australia retaining the World Cup with a 6–0 victory.

=== Details ===
2 December 2017
19:00 AEST (UTC+10:00)

Australia	6–0	England
Tries: Cordner 15'; Goals: Smith (1/1) 16'	Report

Brisbane Stadium, Brisbane
Attendance: 40,033
Referee: Gerard Sutton (Australia)
Touch judges: Chris Kendall (England), Chris Butler (Australia)
Player of the Match: Boyd Cordner (Australia)

FB	1	Billy Slater
WG	2	Dane Gagai
CE	3	Will Chambers
CE	4	Josh Dugan
WG	5	Valentine Holmes
FE	6	Michael Morgan
HB	7	Cooper Cronk
PR	8	Aaron Woods
HK	9	Cameron Smith (c)
PR	10	David Klemmer
SR	11	Boyd Cordner
SR	12	Matt Gillett
LK	13	Josh McGuire
Substitutes:
IN	14	Wade Graham
IN	15	Jordan McLean
IN	16	Reagan Campbell-Gillard
IN	17	Tyson Frizell
Coach:
(Australia) Mal Meninga

FB	1	Gareth Widdop
WG	2	Jermaine McGillvary
CE	3	Kallum Watkins
CE	4	John Bateman
WG	5	Ryan Hall
SO	6	Kevin Brown
SH	7	Luke Gale
PR	8	Chris Hill
HK	9	James Roby
PR	10	James Graham
SR	11	Ben Currie
SR	12	Elliott Whitehead
LK	16	Sam Burgess (c)
Substitutes:
IN	14	Alex Walmsley
IN	15	Thomas Burgess
IN	17	Chris Heighington
IN	18	Jonny Lomax
Coach:
(Australia) Wayne Bennett

Notes:

- Australia became the first team to win the Rugby League World Cup title eleven times.
- This was the first time a team won the World Cup on home soil since 1977.
- The aggregate 6 points scored was the least in a Rugby League World Cup final.
- This match saw a new equal record low for tries in a Rugby League World Cup final with only one try scored.

=== Statistics ===
	Australia	England
Tries	1	0
Conversions	1	0
Penalty goals (attempts)	0 (0)	0 (0)
Field goals (attempts)	0 (0)	0 (0)
Possession
Possession (1st / 2nd)	51% (55% / 47%)	49% (45% / 53%)
Total sets (1st / 2nd)	47 (24 / 23)	43 (21 / 22)
Completed sets (1st / 2nd)	39 (23 / 16)	31 (15 / 16)
Completion rate (1st / 2nd)	83% (95% / 70%)	72% (71% / 73%)
Attacking
All runs	208	208
All run metres	1939	1856
Line breaks	3	3
Offloads	7	8
Defending
Kick metres	745	817
40/20	0	0
Tackles	374	379
Missed tackles	33	31
Goal line dropouts	1	3
Try saves	0	0
Discipline
Penalties conceded	7	6
Errors	8	12
Send offs	0	0
Sin bins	0	0
Reference: NRL Match Centre

Australia:

- Most runs: 25 – Dane Gagai
- Most running metres: 238 – Dane Gagai
- Most tackles: 43 – Cameron Smith
- Most missed tackles: 5 –
  - Will Chambers
  - Josh Dugan
- Most line breaks: 1 –
  - Cooper Cronk
  - Boyd Cordner
  - Matt Gillett

England:

- Most runs: 20 –
  - Jermaine McGillvary
  - Ryan Hall
- Most running metres: 227 – Jermaine McGillvary
- Most tackles: 56 – James Roby
- Most missed tackles: 5 –
  - Ben Currie
  - Elliott Whitehead
- Most line breaks: 1 –
  - Jermaine McGillvary
  - Kallum Watkins
  - Ryan Hall

== Post-match ==
Australia won their 11th World Cup final with the victory. Boyd Cordner was named man of the match, and Billy Slater was named player of the tournament.

At the subsequent 2017 Rugby League World Cup tournament, held in 2022 and hosted by England, saw the host nation eliminated in the semi-finals to Samoa, whereas Australia qualified for their 12th consecutive World Cup final.

== Broadcasting and viewership ==
In Australia, 842,000 viewers watched the match on Seven Network. This figure was higher than second test match of the 2017–18 Ashes series, which was on the same evening.
