= Fiji at the Rugby League World Cup =

Fiji have competed in seven editions of the Rugby League World Cup. Their best finish is the semi-finals, which they made in 2008, 2013, and 2017.

== Tournament history ==
World Cup record
Year	Round	Position	GP	W	L	D
(France) 1954	Did not enter					
(Australia) 1957	Did not enter					
(United Kingdom) 1960	Did not enter					
(Australia) (New Zealand) 1968	Did not enter					
(United Kingdom) 1970	Did not enter					
(France) 1972	Did not enter					
1975	Did not enter					
(Australia) (New Zealand) 1977	Did not enter					
1985–88	Did not enter					
1989–92	Did not enter					
(United Kingdom) 1995	Group Stage	6/10	3	1	2	0
(United Kingdom) (Ireland) (France) 2000	Group Stage	12/16	3	1	2	0
(Australia) 2008	Semi-finals	4/10	4	2	2	0
(England) (Wales) 2013	Semi-finals	4/14	5	2	3	0
(Australia) (New Zealand) (Papua New Guinea) 2017	Semi-finals	4/14	5	4	1	0
(England) 2021	Quarter-finals	6/16	4	2	2	0
(Australia) (New Zealand) (Papua New Guinea) 2026	Group Stage	8/10	3	1	2	0
Total	0 Titles	4/13	27	13	14	0

== Tournaments ==
Key
Colour	Meaning
	Qualifiers to the next round

=== 1995 ===
Team	Pld	W	D	L	PF	PA	PD	Pts	Qualification
England	3	3	0	0	112	16	+96	6	Advances to knockout stage
Australia	3	2	0	1	168	26	+142	4	Advances to knockout stage
Fiji	3	1	0	2	52	118	−66	2	
South Africa	3	0	0	3	12	184	−172	0	

Round	Score	Opposition	Venue
Group Stage	52–6	South Africa	Cougar Park, Keighley
Group Stage	0–46	England	Central Park, Wigan
Group Stage	0–66	Australia	Kirklees Stadium, Huddersfield

=== 2000 ===
Pos	Team	Pld	W	D	L	PF	PA	PD	Pts	Qualification
1	Australia	3	3	0	0	198	14	+184	6	Advance to knockout stage
2	England	3	2	0	1	144	36	+108	4	Advance to knockout stage
3	Fiji	3	1	0	2	56	144	−88	2	
4	Russia	3	0	0	3	20	224	−204	0	

Source: Rugby League Project

Round	Score	Opposition	Venue
Group Stage	38–12	Russia	Craven Park, Hull
Group Stage	8–66	Australia	Gateshead International Stadium, Gateshead
Group Stage	10–66	England	Headingley, Leeds

=== 2008 ===
Pos	Team	Pld	W	D	L	PF	PA	PD	Pts	Qualification
1	Fiji	2	1	0	1	58	24	+34	2	Advance to knockout stage
2	Scotland	2	1	0	1	36	52	−16	2	
3	France	2	1	0	1	42	60	−18	2	

Round	Score	Opposition	Venue
Group Stage	42–6	France	Wollongong Showground, Wollongong
Group Stage	16–18	Scotland	Central Coast Stadium, Gosford
Semi-Final Qualifier	30–14	Ireland	Robina Stadium, Gold Coast
Semi-Final	0–52	Australia	Sydney Football Stadium, Sydney

=== 2013 ===
Team	Pld	W	D	L	TF	PF	PA	+/−	Pts
Australia	3	3	0	0	20	112	22	+90	6
England	3	2	0	1	18	96	40	+56	4
Fiji	3	1	0	2	8	46	82	–36	2
Ireland	3	0	0	3	3	14	124	–110	0

Round	Score	Opposition	Venue
Group Stage	32–14	Ireland	Thomond Park, Limerick
Group Stage	2–34	Australia	Langtree Park, St Helens
Group Stage	12–34	England	Millennium Stadium, Cardiff
Quarter-Final	22–4	Samoa	Halliwell Jones Stadium, Warrington
Semi-Final	0–64	Australia	Wembley Stadium, London

=== 2017 ===
Pos	Team	Pld	W	D	L	PF	PA	PD	Pts	Qualification
1	Fiji	3	3	0	0	168	28	+140	6	Advance to knockout stage
2	Italy	3	1	0	2	68	74	−6	2	
3	United States	3	0	0	3	12	168	−156	0	

Round	Score	Opposition	Venue
Group Stage	58–12	United States	Willows Sports Complex, Townsville
Group Stage	72–6	Wales	Willows Sports Complex, Townsville
Group Stage	34–0	Italy	Canberra Stadium, Canberra
Quarter-Final	4–2	New Zealand	Wellington Regional Stadium, Wellington
Semi-Final	6–54	Australia	Lang Park, Brisbane

=== 2021 ===
Pos	Team	Pld	W	D	L	PF	PA	PD	Pts	Qualification
1	Australia	3	3	0	0	192	14	+178	6	Advance to knockout stage
2	Fiji	3	2	0	1	98	60	+38	4	Advance to knockout stage
3	Italy	3	1	0	2	38	130	−92	2	
4	Scotland	3	0	0	3	18	142	−124	0	

Source: rlwc2021

Round	Score	Opposition	Venue
Group Stage	8–42	Australia	Headingley, Leeds
Group Stage	60–4	Italy	Kingston Park, Newcastle
Group Stage	30–14	Scotland	Kingston Park, Newcastle
Quarter-Final	18–24	New Zealand	MKM Stadium. Hull

=== 2026 ===
Pos	Team	Pld	W	D	L	PF	PA	PD	Pts	Qualification
1	Australia (H)	3	3	0	0	126	50	+76	6	Advance to knockout stage
2	New Zealand (H)	3	2	0	1	182	40	+142	4	Advance to knockout stage
3	Fiji	3	1	0	2	62	126	−64	2	
4	Cook Islands	3	0	0	3	34	188	−154	0	

Source: Source
Rules for classification: Pool stage tiebreakers
(H) Hosts

Round	Score	Opposition	Venue
Group Stage	40–12	Cook Islands	McDonald Jones Stadium, Newcastle
Group Stage	22–36	Australia	Suncorp Stadium, Brisbane
Group Stage	0–78	New Zealand	Cbus Super Stadium, Gold Coast
