= Ankle tap =

Form of tackle in some sports

An ankle-tap or tap-tackle is a form of tackle used in rugby league, rugby union and gridiron football.

It is used when the player carrying the ball is running at speed and a defending player is approaching from behind or the side. If the defender is not able to get close enough to the ball-carrier to wrap his arms around him in a conventional tackle, he may still be able to dive at the other player's feet and, with an outstretched arm, deliver a tap or hook to the player's foot or ankle, causing the player to stumble. At speed, this will often be sufficient to bring the ball-carrier down.
