= Brendon Gotuno =

Papua New Guinean rugby league footballer

Personal information
- Born: 23 October 1995 (age 29); Chimbu Province, Papua New Guinea
- Height: 170 cm (5 ft 7 in)
- Weight: 73 kg (11 st 7 lb)

Playing information
- Position: Centre
Club
Years	Team	Pld	T	G	FG	P
2018–21	PNG Hunters	8	6	0	0	24
Representative
Years	Team	Pld	T	G	FG	P
2017	PNG Prime Minister's XIII	1	0	0	0	0

Brendon Gotuno is a Papua New Guinean professional rugby league footballer who plays as a Centre for the Papua New Guinea Hunters in the Queensland Cup.

He was signed by the Penrith Panthers through the Lion Heart International (LHI) Sports Foundation program to play for their Intrust Super Premiership team in 2019 but due to visa and passport complications he returned to the Papua New Guinea Hunters for the 2019 season.
