= Kato Ottio =

PNG international rugby league footballer (1994–2018)

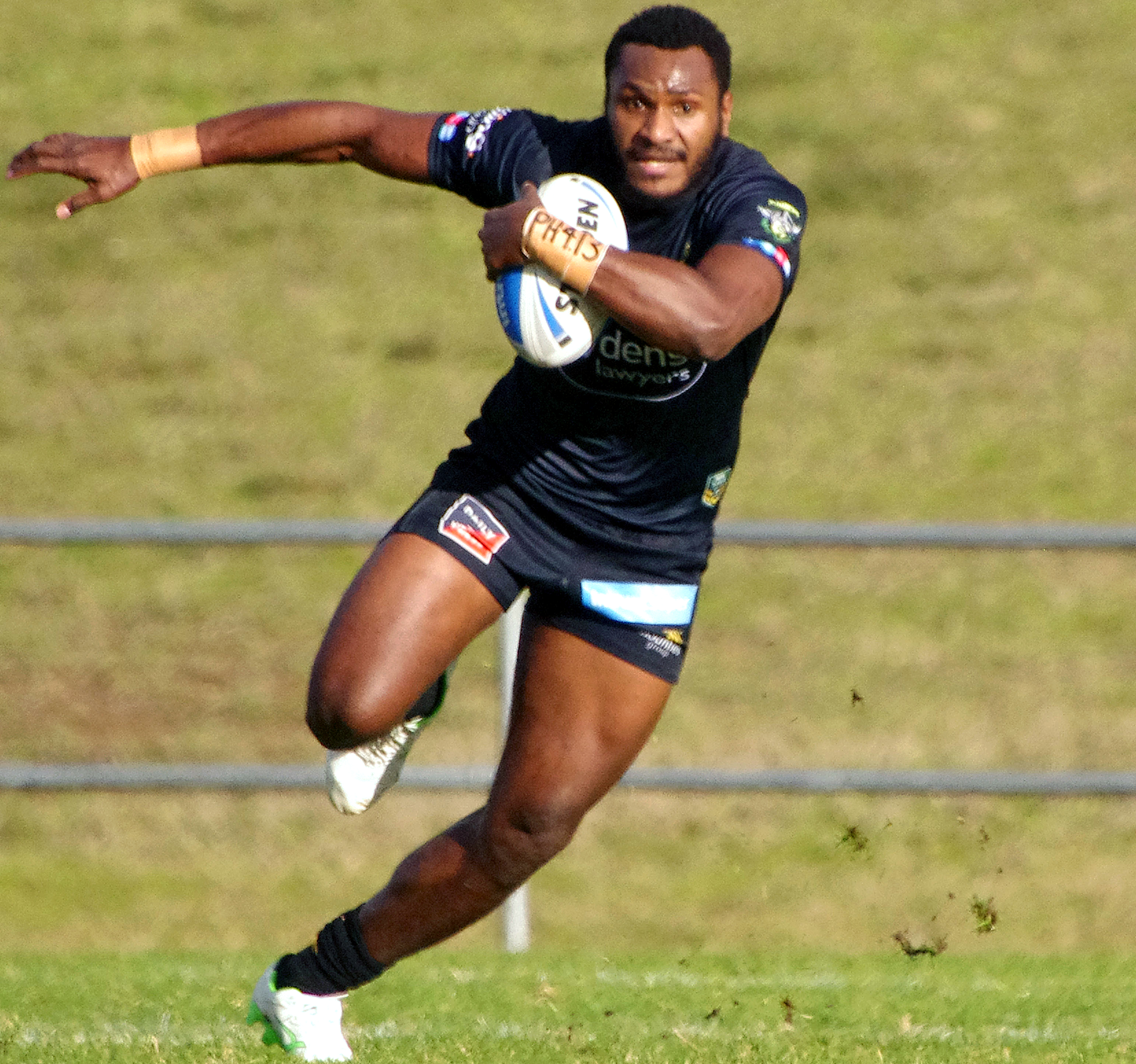

Personal information
- Full name: Benkato Ottio
- Born: 20 March 1994 Tatana Island, Papua New Guinea
- Died: 9 January 2018 (aged 23) Port Moresby, Papua New Guinea

Playing information
- Height: 194 cm (6 ft 4 in)
- Weight: 102 kg (16 st 1 lb)
- Position: Wing, Centre, Second-row
Club
| Years | Team | Pld | T | G | FG | P |
|---|---|---|---|---|---|---|
| 2015 | PNG Hunters | 22 | 6 | 0 | 0 | 24 |
Representative
| Years | Team | Pld | T | G | FG | P |
| 2014 | PNG Prime Minister's XIII | 1 | 0 | 0 | 0 | 0 |
| 2015–17 | Papua New Guinea | 6 | 2 | 0 | 0 | 8 |
Medals
Men's rugby league nines
Representing Papua New Guinea
Pacific Games
| Gold medal – first place | 2015 Port Moresby | Team |
Men's volleyball
Representing Papua New Guinea
Pacific Mini Games
| Gold medal – first place | 2013 Mata-Utu | Team |

Benkato "Kato" Ottio (20 March 1994 – 9 January 2018) was a Papua New Guinean rugby league footballer. Primarily playing as a centre, Ottio represented Papua New Guinea, most notably at the 2017 World Cup.

== Early life ==
Ottio was born and raised in the village of Tatana, near Port Moresby, Papua New Guinea.

Before playing rugby league, Ottio played volleyball and was a member of PNG's squad at the 2013 Pacific Mini Games in Wallis and Futuna, which won gold, and Amoa NCD's team at the 2014 Asian Men's Club Volleyball Championship in the Philippines. Ottio then took up rugby league exclusively, playing at an amateur level for the Dobo Warriors.

== Playing career ==
=== Early career ===
In October 2014, Ottio played for the PNG Prime Minister's XIII against the Australian Prime Minister's XIII, which saw him subsequently sign with the Papua New Guinea Hunters of the Queensland Cup, starting in 2015. Ottio made his debut for the national side in May 2015 against Fiji. In February 2016, Ottio signed a two-year contract with the Canberra Raiders, spending the duration with the Raiders' feeder team, the Mount Pritchard Mounties, in the New South Wales Cup. He was named on the wing in the 2016 NSW Cup Team of the Year, having scored 29 tries in 23 games, the New South Wales Rugby League's leading tryscorer in 2016. Ottio was not considered for PNG's May 2017 match against the Cook Islands as he had recently returned from a long-term injury. In October 2017, Ottio was named in PNG's squad for the 2017 World Cup.

=== Widnes Vikings ===
In December 2017, Ottio signed with the Widnes Vikings who play in the Super League.

== International caps ==
Ottio won six caps for the national side, known as the Kumuls. His debut was in May 2015 against Fiji at the Robina Stadium, Gold Coast. A second cap, also against Fiji came a year later and Ottio scored his debut international try at the Parramatta Stadium in Sydney. Selected for the Kumuls squad for the 2017 World Cup, he played in all three of the team's group games played in Port Moresby and scored a try in the game against Wales. His final international match was the quarter-final defeat by England at the Melbourne Rectangular Stadium.

== Death ==
Ottio collapsed due to heat stroke while training alongside the Papua New Guinea Hunters on 7 January 2018, and died in the early hours of 9 January suffering from internal bleeding. He had been due to travel to the United Kingdom to join the Widnes Vikings squad for pre-season training on 11 January. Ottio's funeral was held on 12 January at Sir John Guise Indoor Complex, and was attended by the Prime Minister of Papua New Guinea, Peter O'Neill.
