= Luke Page =

PNG international rugby league footballer

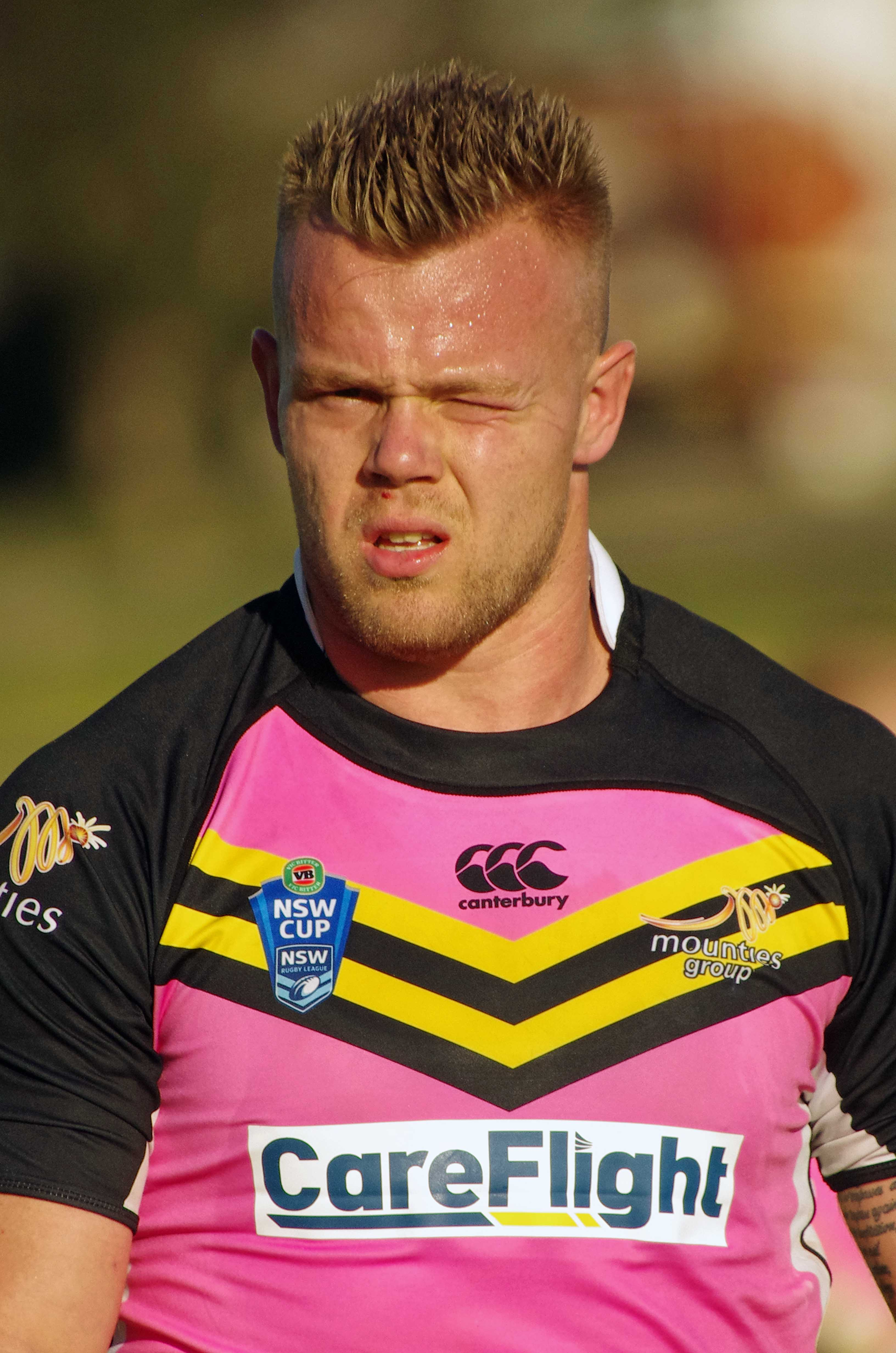
- Page playing for the Mount Pritchard Mounties in 2015

Personal information
- Born: 12 January 1991 (age 35) Brisbane, Queensland, Australia
- Height: 186 cm (6 ft 1 in)
- Weight: 108 kg (17 st 0 lb)

Playing information
- Position: Prop
Club
| Years | Team | Pld | T | G | FG | P |
|---|---|---|---|---|---|---|
| 2015 | St. George Illawarra | 1 | 0 | 0 | 0 | 0 |
Representative
| Years | Team | Pld | T | G | FG | P |
| 2014 | Queensland Residents | 1 | 0 | 0 | 0 | 0 |
| 2015–19 | Papua New Guinea | 11 | 1 | 0 | 0 | 4 |
- Source: As of 6 January 2024

Luke Page (born 12 January 1991) is a former Papua New Guinea international rugby league footballer who last played as a prop for the Burleigh Bears in the Queensland Cup.

Page played one National Rugby League match in his career, for the St. George Illawarra Dragons in 2015. Nicknamed the 'White Kumul', he has represented the Papua New Guinean national team, and was a member of their 2017 World Cup squad.

== Background ==
Page was born in Brisbane, Queensland, Australia.

He played his junior rugby league for the Centenary Panthers, before being signed by the Brisbane Broncos. He is eligible to represent Papua New Guinea as his father and paternal grandfather were born and raised there after his great-grandparents established a firearm business in Port Moresby.

== Playing career ==
=== Early career ===
Page joined the Gold Coast Titans and played for their NYC team between 2009 and 2011. At the end of the 2011 season, he won the Titans' NYC Player of the Year award. In 2012, he moved on to the Titans' Queensland Cup team, Ipswich Jets. In 2013, he joined the Burleigh Bears.

In May 2014, he joined the Canberra Raiders effective immediately until the end of 2015. He played the remainder of the season with Canberra's affiliate club, the Souths Logan Magpies, in the Queensland Cup. He represented the Queensland Residents against the New South Wales Residents on 9 July, and won the 2014 Queensland Cup Player of the Year award at the end of the season.

=== 2015 ===
Page began the 2015 season playing for Canberra's feeder club, the Mount Pritchard Mounties, in the New South Wales Cup. In April, he gained wide-spread recognition after the Mounties uploaded a highlights package of him to their YouTube account, playing against the Manly Warringah Sea Eagles. It attracted more than 200,000 hits online. On 2 May, he played for Papua New Guinea against Fiji in the 2015 Melanesian Cup. On 1 July, he joined the St. George Illawarra Dragons mid-season effective immediately for the rest of the year. In Round 17 of the 2015 NRL season, he made his NRL debut for the Dragons against the North Queensland Cowboys. On 27 September, he was named at prop in the 2015 New South Wales Cup Team of the Year, having finished the season with the Dragons' feeder club, the Illawarra Cutters.

=== 2016 ===
In 2016, Page returned to the Burleigh Bears in the Queensland Cup, after failing to gain a new contract with the Dragons. On 7 May, he played for Papua New Guinea against Fiji in the 2016 Melanesian Cup.

=== 2017 - 2021 ===
Page would continue to play for Burleigh over the next five seasons and was part of the Burleigh side which won the 2019 Queensland Cup competition. Page would later play for Burleigh in their 2019 NRL State Championship final defeat against Newtown. In October 2021, Page announced he would be retiring from rugby league. Page played his final game for Burleigh in their preliminary final defeat against Norths Devils. Page had a conversion attempt in his final match which was relatively close to the uprights but his kick went well wide and bounced towards the corner post.
