= Justin Olam =

Papua New Guinea international rugby league footballer

Justin “Juzzy” Olam
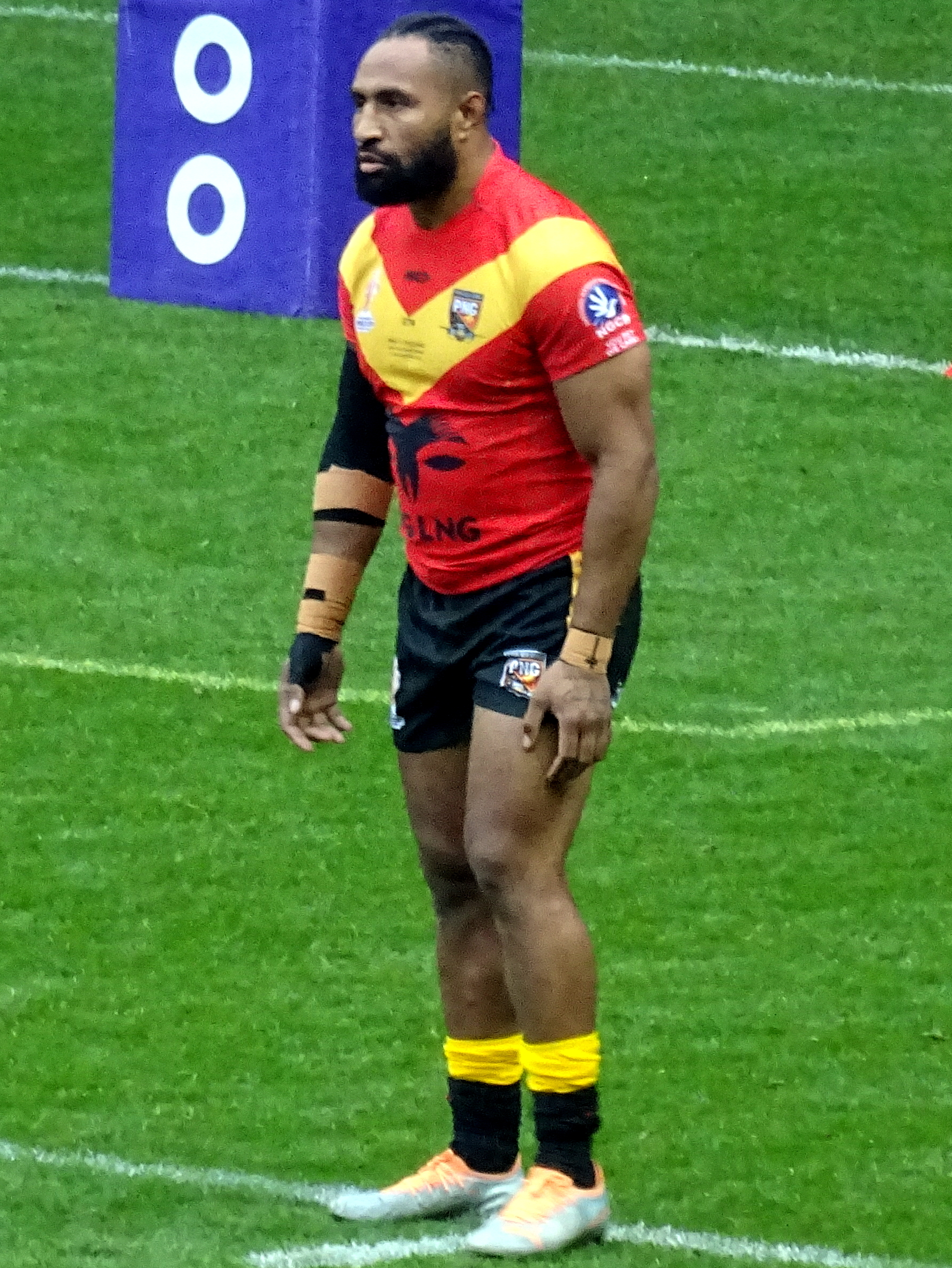

Personal information
- Full name: Justin Olam
- Born: 23 December 1993 (age 32) Gon, Chimbu, Papua New Guinea
- Height: 178 cm (5 ft 10 in)
- Weight: 92 kg (14 st 7 lb)

Playing information
- Position: Centre
Club
Years	Team	Pld	T	G	FG	P
2018–23	Melbourne Storm	104	46	0	0	184
2024	Wests Tigers	13	6	0	0	24
	Total	117	52	0	0	208
Representative
Years	Team	Pld	T	G	FG	P
2015–16	PNG Prime Minister's XIII	2	1	0	0	4
2016–22	Papua New Guinea	14	7	0	0	28
2019	PNG 9s	3	1	0	0	4
- Source: As of 1 August 2024

Justin Olam (born 23 December 1993) is a Papua New Guinean former professional rugby league footballer who last played for Wests Tigers in the NRL and Papua New Guinea at international level.

In 2020 Olam won an NRL premiership with the Melbourne Storm and in the following year he was awarded the Dally M centre of the year. He is the second Papua New Guinean local rugby league player to play in the NRL without having played junior rugby league in Australia, emulating his countryman, and former Melbourne Storm 1999 NRL premiership winner, Marcus Bai.

== Early life ==
Justin Olam was born and raised in Gon, a small village in the Sinesine Yonggomugl District of the mountainous Chimbu Province, Papua New Guinea.

He was not able to play much rugby league due to both of his parents wanting him to prioritise his education.

Olam was educated at Rosary (Kondiu) Secondary School in Chimbu and attended the Papua New Guinea University of Technology in Lae Morobe Province where he graduated with a Bachelor's Degree in Applied Physics. Whilst studying for his degree, Olam began playing rugby league for the Unitech Spartans in the PNG Universities competition.

In 2015, during his final year at the Papua New Guinea University of Technology, he went on to play for the Lae Snax Tigers in the Papua New Guinea National Rugby League.

== Playing career ==
=== 2016 ===
After impressive performance in the Digicel Cup for the Lae Snax Tigers in the Papua New Guinea National Rugby League, he was signed by the PNG Hunters for the 2016 Queensland Cup season. He played for them for one year in the Queensland Cup. He went on to make his international debut for Papua New Guinea Kumuls at the 2016 Pacific Test against Fiji Bati. With a successful 2016 campaign, Olam signed a contract with the Melbourne Storm for the 2017 and 2018 season in the NRL.

=== 2017 ===
In 2017, he played in every game for the Melbourne Storm feeder club Sunshine Coast Falcons in the Intrust Super Cup competition through to the grand final loss against his former team PNG Hunters who came from behind to score in the dying minutes and won 12–10 at Suncorp Stadium. He was still patient for an opportunity to make the Melbourne Storm first grade team. He also continued to represent Papua New Guinea Kumuls in the 2017 Pacific Test and 2017 Rugby League World Cup.

=== 2018 ===
In round 9 of the 2018 NRL season Olam made his NRL debut in the centres for the Melbourne Storm against the St George Illawarra Dragons at Jubilee Oval where he set up a try for his winger Josh Addo-Carr. He had his Melbourne jersey (cap number 187) presented to him by fellow Melbourne Storm player Billy Slater.

He then played two further games at the end of the season in round 24 against Gold Coast Titans and round 25 against Penrith Panthers in the NRL season. He continued international representation for his beloved Papua New Guinea Kumuls in the Pacific Test against Fiji Bati in Sydney and two end of year test against the England Knights in Lae and Port Moresby. His contract was extended for another two years after impressive string of performance in the reserve grade which will keep him at the Melbourne Storm till the end of the 2020 NRL season.

=== 2019 ===
In round 24 of the 2019 NRL season Olam scored his first ever NRL hat-trick in his 13th game against Manly-Warringah Sea Eagles at Lottoland Brookvale Oval. He finished off strongly in the 2019 season with him playing in 14 games and scored 7 tries at the back end of the season, and touted by many as one of the most Improved NRL player of the modern era. His continuous rising in the top grade kept the likes of Will Chambers, Sandor Earl, Curtis Scott, Solomone Kata and Marion Seve on the bench or cooling their heels off in reserve grade. On 2 October, Olam was named in the Papua New Guinea Kumuls team for the inaugural 2019 Rugby League World Cup 9s. During the two days Downer Rugby League World Cup 9s tournament at the Bankwest Stadium in Sydney, he played in all of their three pool matches against the USA Hawks, the New Zealand Kiwis and the Australia Kangaroos, where Olam scored one try against the New Zealand Kiwis. On 23 October, he was again named in the Papua New Guinea Kumuls squad for the 2019 Oceania Cup (rugby league) Pool B Ox & Palm Pacific Invitational Test against Fiji Bati at Christchurch Stadium in New Zealand on 9 November 2019, and Great Britain Lions on 16 November 2019 at the National Football Stadium in Port Moresby Papua New Guinea. In the game against the Great Britain Lions he played at left centre and scored one try as the Kumuls defeated the GB Lions 28–10.

=== 2020 ===
On 14–15 February 2020, Olam played for Melbourne in the NRL Nines tournament in Perth. He also played in the pre-season NRL trial matches against New Zealand Warriors and North Queensland. He performed very strongly in both defence and attack in these games, which resulted in him cementing the left centre spot for the Storm. With his current scintillating form he was rewarded with a two-year contract on May 22 to keep him at Melbourne until the end of 2022.

Affectionately known as 'the human brick', by his teammates, Olam plays with seemingly no sense of self-preservation. He scored his first try of the 2020 season in round four against South Sydney. In round 16 he scored his second career hat-trick against Manly-Warringah.On October 16, in Melbourne's Preliminary Final game against the Canberra Raiders at Suncorp Stadium, Olam scored a try in the 23rd minute off a kick from teammate Ryan Papenhuyzen, miraculously leaping over both Papenhuyzen and Canberra player Hudson Young while avoiding the arm of Nick Cotric to catch the ball mid-air before grounding it. Melbourne went on to win the match 30-10 and qualified for the Grand Final. On the 25 October, Melbourne went on to win the Grand final, beating the Penrith Panthers 26–20 in which Olam scored a penalty try in the fourth minute of the match.

=== 2021 ===
Olam played a total of 25 games for Melbourne in the 2021 NRL season as the club won 19 matches in a row and claimed the Minor Premiership. Olam played in all three final matches including the preliminary final where Melbourne suffered a surprise 10–6 loss against eventual premiers Penrith Panthers. Afterwards, Melbourne star Cameron Munster took to Instagram to vent his frustration at teammate Olam being snubbed for consideration in the Dally M team of the year. "I'm not usually one for a rant, but pretty disappointed my PNG brother Justin Olam didn't even get nominated for Centre of the year!" Munster wrote on his Instagram story. "He's easily a top-three Centre. Don't come at me. The system needs a change, NRL". Olam was one of the biggest surprises when the nominees for every position were announced on the Monday night ahead of the second night of the prestigious event, which was held at Brisbane's Howard Smith Wharves. According to reports there was a last-minute backflip from the NRL to grant Olam an invite to the event where the NRL would announce the best Centre of the 2021 season, alongside the Player of the Year Award. The Courier-Mail first reported the league did a U-turn on extending an invite to Olam for Monday's ceremony after first claiming an “administrative oversight” was behind the failure to recognise Olam's performances in 2021.The Papua New Guinea star has had a breakout season leading to recognition from NRL immortal Andrew Johns that he was the “best Centre in the world” earlier this year. He was later invited and awarded the well deserved Dally M Centre of the year award.

=== 2022 ===
In the 2022 NRL season, Olam played 24 matches for Melbourne and scored ten tries. Olam played for Melbourne in their elimination final loss to Canberra. In late 2022, Olam represented Papua New Guinea at the 2021 Rugby League World Cup playing all four games before they were eliminated by England at the quarter-final stage.

=== 2023 ===
On 14 February, it was announced that Olam would miss the opening six rounds of the 2023 NRL season due to an arm injury he sustained during the clubs pre-season trial against the Sydney Roosters. Olam played 17 games for Melbourne in the 2023 NRL season as the club finished third on the table. Olam was called into the Melbourne side for their semi-final against the Sydney Roosters after not being selected for the qualifying final against Brisbane. In the preliminary final against Penrith, Olam scored a try in the first half but also lost the ball close to an open line when the scores were tied at 4-4. Melbourne would go on to lose the match 38–4.

=== 2024 ===
On 12 January, Olam signed a three-year deal with the Wests Tigers. As part of the deal, Wests Tigers player Shawn Blore headed to Melbourne on a three-year deal in a player swap. In round 3 of the 2024 NRL season, Olam made his club debut for the Wests Tigers and scored a try as they defeated Cronulla 32–6. In round 15, Olam scored two tries for the club as they defeated the Gold Coast 18–10. This also ended a nine-game losing streak in the process. In round 22, Olam was sent off for a high tackle in Wests Tigers 48–30 loss against North Queensland. Olam decided not to contest the grading of his high tackle after he ended his season requiring surgery on both of his knees.

=== 2025 ===
On 28 March, Olam announced his medical retirement from the NRL after struggling to recover from a knee injury sustained in the 2024 season.

== Statistics ==
Year	Team	Games	Tries	Pts
2018	Melbourne Storm	3		
2019	Melbourne Storm	14	7	28
2020	Melbourne Storm	21	11	44
2021	Melbourne Storm	25	12	48
2022	Melbourne Storm	24	10	40
2023	Melbourne Storm	17	6	24
2024	Wests Tigers	13	6	24
	Total	117	52	208

=== Highlights ===
- Junior Club: Unitech Spartans
- Won the PNG Unitech VC Cup in 2015 with the AP Photons (Applied Physics Students) as captain of the team
- Played for the PNG Prime Minister's XIII (2015,2016,2018)
- International Test Debut: v Fiji Bati, May 17, 2016
- First Grade Debut: Round 9, Melbourne Storm v St George Illawarra Dragons at Jubilee Oval, Sun 6 May 2018
- First NRL Try: Round 17, Melbourne Storm v Cronulla-Sutherland Sharks at AAMI Park, Sat 13 Jul 2019
- First NRL Hat-trick: Round 24, Melbourne Storm v Manly Warringah Sea Eagles at Brookvale Oval Aug 31 2019
- Played in the Papua New Guinea Kumuls team that beat the Great Britain Lions at Port Moresby National Football Stadium PNG, Sat 16 Nov 2019
- 2019: (Melbourne Storm) NRL Minor Premiership winner (J J Giltinan Shield)
- 2020: (Melbourne Storm) NRL Premiership winner (Provan-Summons Trophy)
- 2021: (Melbourne Storm) NRL Minor Premiership winner (J J Giltinan Shield)

=== Individual Accolades ===
- 2016: Queensland Cup XXXX People's Choice Award winner
- 2017: Queensland Cup Best centre of the year Award Winner
- 2020: NRL Melbourne Storm Most Improved Player of the year Award Winner
- 2021: NRL Dally M. Medal centre of the year Award Winner
