= Bland Abavu =

PNG international rugby league footballer

Personal information
- Full name: Bland Abavu
- Born: 10 May 1990 (age 36) Port Moresby, Papua New Guinea

Playing information
- Position: Fullback
Club
Years	Team	Pld	T	G	FG	P
2016–17	PNG Hunters	11	5	0	0	20
Representative
Years	Team	Pld	T	G	FG	P
2016	PNG Prime Minister's XIII	1	0	0	0	0
- Source: As of 10 November 2023
Medals
Men's rugby league nines
Representing Papua New Guinea
Pacific Games
Gold medal – first place	2015 Port Moresby	Team

Bland Abavu (born 10 May 1990), also known as Oti Bland Tony, is a Papua New Guinean rugby league footballer who plays for the PNG Hunters in the Queensland Cup.

In September 2016, Abavu played at fullback for PNG Prime Minister's XIII in a 0–58 defeat against the Australian Prime Minister's XIII.
