= Wellington Albert =

PNG international rugby league footballer

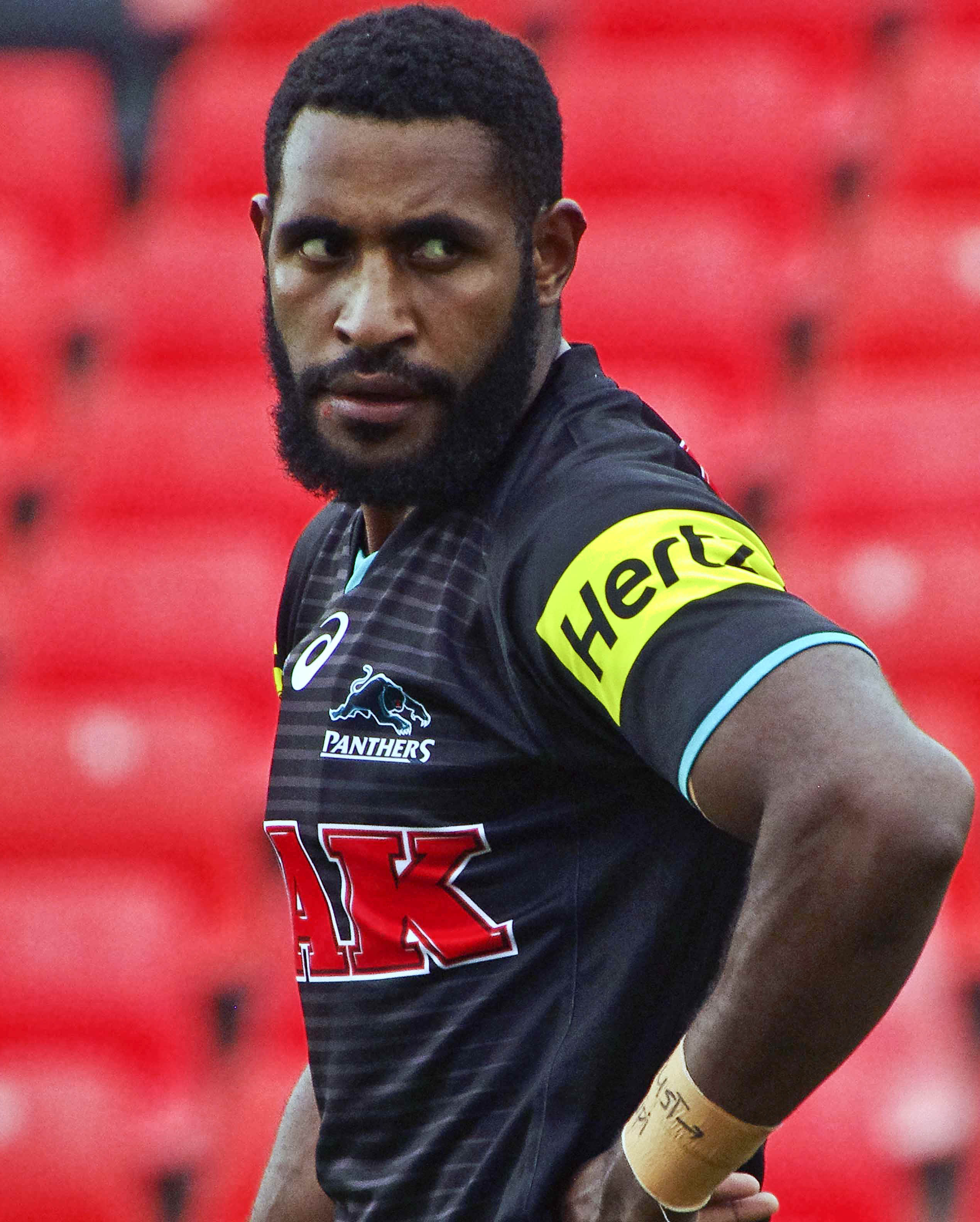

Personal information
- Born: 3 September 1994 (age 32) Mendi, Southern Highlands, Papua New Guinea
- Height: 6 ft 6 in (1.98 m)
- Weight: 17 st 11 lb (113 kg)

Playing information
- Position: Prop, Loose forward
Club
Years	Team	Pld	T	G	FG	P
2017	PNG Hunters
2018–19	Widnes Vikings	13	2	0	0	8
2018(loan)	→ N. Wales Crusaders	1	0	0	0	0
2019–20	Leeds Rhinos	6	1	0	0	4
2019(DR)	→ Featherstone Rovers	12	2	0	0	8
2020(loan)	→ Featherstone Rovers	6	4	0	0	16
2021	Keighley Cougars	0	0	0	0	0
2022–23	London Broncos	41	6	0	0	24
2024	Featherstone Rovers	19	1	0	0	4
	Total	98	16	0	0	64
Representative
Years	Team	Pld	T	G	FG	P
2013	PNG Prime Minister's XIII	1	0	0	0	0
2013–	Papua New Guinea	14	2	0	0	8
- Source: As of 20 November 2026
- Relatives: Stanton Albert (brother)

Wellington Albert (born 3 September 1994) (Note: The official website of the 2013 Rugby League World Cup lists Albert's birth year as 1993, though the Penrith Panthers list his birth year as 1994, claiming it to be the date recorded on his passport. PNG media and rugby league coaches have also reportedly claimed that Albert was born in 1992.) is a Papua New Guinean professional rugby league footballer who last played as a prop for Featherstone Rovers in the RFL Championship and Papua New Guinea at international level.

He previously played for the London Broncos, Keighley Cougars, Featherstone Rovers, Leeds Rhinos, North Wales Crusaders and the Widnes Vikings.

== Background ==
Albert was born in Mendi, Southern Highlands in Papua New Guinea. He is the elder brother of former PNG international Stanton Albert.

== Playing career ==
=== Mendi Muruks ===
He played for the Mendi Muruks and the Lae Snax Tigers in the PNGNRL before being selected to represent Papua New Guinea at the 2013 World Cup.

=== PNG Hunters ===
On 12 December 2013, Albert was named in the Papua New Guinea Hunters' squad for their inaugural 2014 season in the Queensland Cup, though he later signed a two-year deal with the Penrith Panthers starting in 2014. He was the second Papua New Guinean player to be signed by an NRL club without having played junior rugby league in Australia.

Albert played 5 games for the Panthers' NYC team in 2014 before suffering a season-ending shoulder injury. In 2015, Albert moved into the Panthers' NSW Cup team.

=== Keighley Cougars ===
At the end of the 2020 championship Albert joined League 1 team, Keighley Cougars Prior to the start of the 2021 season he suffered a serious ankle injury in training which prevented him playing at all in 2021.

=== London Broncos ===
On 3 November 2021, it was reported that he had signed for London Broncos in the RFL Championship. On 15 October 2023, Albert played in the London Broncos upset Million Pound Game victory over Toulouse Olympique.

=== Featherstone Rovers ===
On 7 December 2023, it was reported that he had signed with Featherstone in the RFL Championship.

== International career ==
He played for the Kumuls in their pre-tournament match against Scotland, where he scored a try. His only match of the tournament was against New Zealand on 8 November 2013, where he again scored a try.

On 2 May 2015, he represented Papua New Guinea in the 2015 Melanesian Cup against Fiji.

He is the largest man in the PNG pack standing at 196 cm tall and weighing in at 113 kilograms.

== Personal life ==
In 2014, Albert started an economics degree at the University of Western Sydney. His brother Stanton has returned to Papua New Guinea from England to play for the PNG Hunters team in the Queensland Cup in 2018.
