= Thompson Teteh =

Papua New Guinea rugby league footballer (born 1989)

Personal information
- Born: 12 July 1989 (age 37) Morobe, Papua New Guinea
- Height: 180 cm (5 ft 11 in)
- Weight: 93 kg (14 st 9 lb)

Playing information
- Position: Centre
Club
Years	Team	Pld	T	G	FG	P
2014–16	PNG Hunters	56	39	0	0	156
2017	Redcliffe Dolphins	23	6	0	0	24
2018	PNG Hunters	13	4	0	0	16
2019	Featherstone Rovers	6	4	0	0	16
	Total	98	53	0	0	212
Representative
Years	Team	Pld	T	G	FG	P
2014	PNG Prime Minister's XIII	1	2	0	0	8
2015–18	Papua New Guinea	5	1	0	0	4
- Source: As of 20 November 2018
Medals
Men's rugby league nines
Representing Papua New Guinea
Pacific Games
Gold medal – first place	2015 Port Moresby	Team

Thompson Teteh (born 12 July 1989) is a Papua New Guinea rugby league footballer who played for Featherstone Rovers in the Championship. Teteh previously played for the PNG Hunters and the Redcliffe Dolphins in the Queensland Cup in Australia and has represented the Papua New Guinean national team.

== Background ==
Teteh was born in Lae, Morobe, Papua New Guinea.

== Playing career ==
Teteh trained with the South Sydney Rabbitohs on a six-week trial contract during the 2015 pre-season. After playing 50 games for the PNG Hunters, Teteh joined the Dolphins at the start of the 2017 season. He returned to the PNG Hunters in 2018 because of visa renewal issues.
