= Moses Meninga =

PNG international rugby league footballer

Personal information
- Born: 6 June 1993 (age 33) Mount Hagen, Papua New Guinea
- Height: 186 cm (6 ft 1 in)
- Weight: 104 kg (16 st 5 lb)

Playing information
- Position: Prop, Second-row, Lock
Club
Years	Team	Pld	T	G	FG	P
2017–19	Papua New Guinea Hunters	55	9	0	0	36
2020–	Townsville Blackhawks	5	1	0	0	4
	Total	60	10	0	0	40
Representative
Years	Team	Pld	T	G	FG	P
2015	PNG Prime Minister's XIII	1	0	0	0	0
2017–19	Papua New Guinea	4	0	0	0	0
2019–	Papua New Guinea 9s	3	0	0	0	0
- Source: As of 10 November 2023

Moses Meninga (born 6 June 1993) is a Papua New Guinean professional rugby league footballer who plays for the Townsville Blackhawks in the Queensland Cup. He represented the Papua New Guinea national team at the 2017 World Cup.

== Biography ==
Meninga was born in Mount Hagen, Papua New Guinea. His family name was traditionally spelled Mennga. He played his junior rugby league for the Solo Eels.
