= Butler Morris =

PNG international rugby union & league player

Personal information
- Born: 20 April 1994 (age 31) Madang, Papua New Guinea

Playing information

Rugby league
- Position: Wing, Centre
Club
Years	Team	Pld	T	G	FG	P
2016–19	PNG Hunters	40	7	0	0	28
Representative
Years	Team	Pld	T	G	FG	P
2016	PNG Prime Minister's XIII	1	0	0	0	0

Rugby union
- Position: Flanker
Representative
Years	Team	Pld	T	G	FG	P
20??	Papua New Guinea	1	0	0	0	0
20??	PNG rugby sevens	1	0	0	0	0
- As of 10 November 2023

Butler Morris (born 20 April 1994 in Madang, Papua New Guinea) is a Papua New Guinean professional rugby union and rugby league footballer who has played in the 2010s. He has played representative rugby union (RU) for Papua New Guinea (Pukpuks) and the Papua New Guinea rugby sevens, as flanker, and club level rugby league (RL) for the Papua New Guinea Hunters in the Queensland Intrust Super Cup.
