= Stanton Albert =

PNG international rugby league footballer

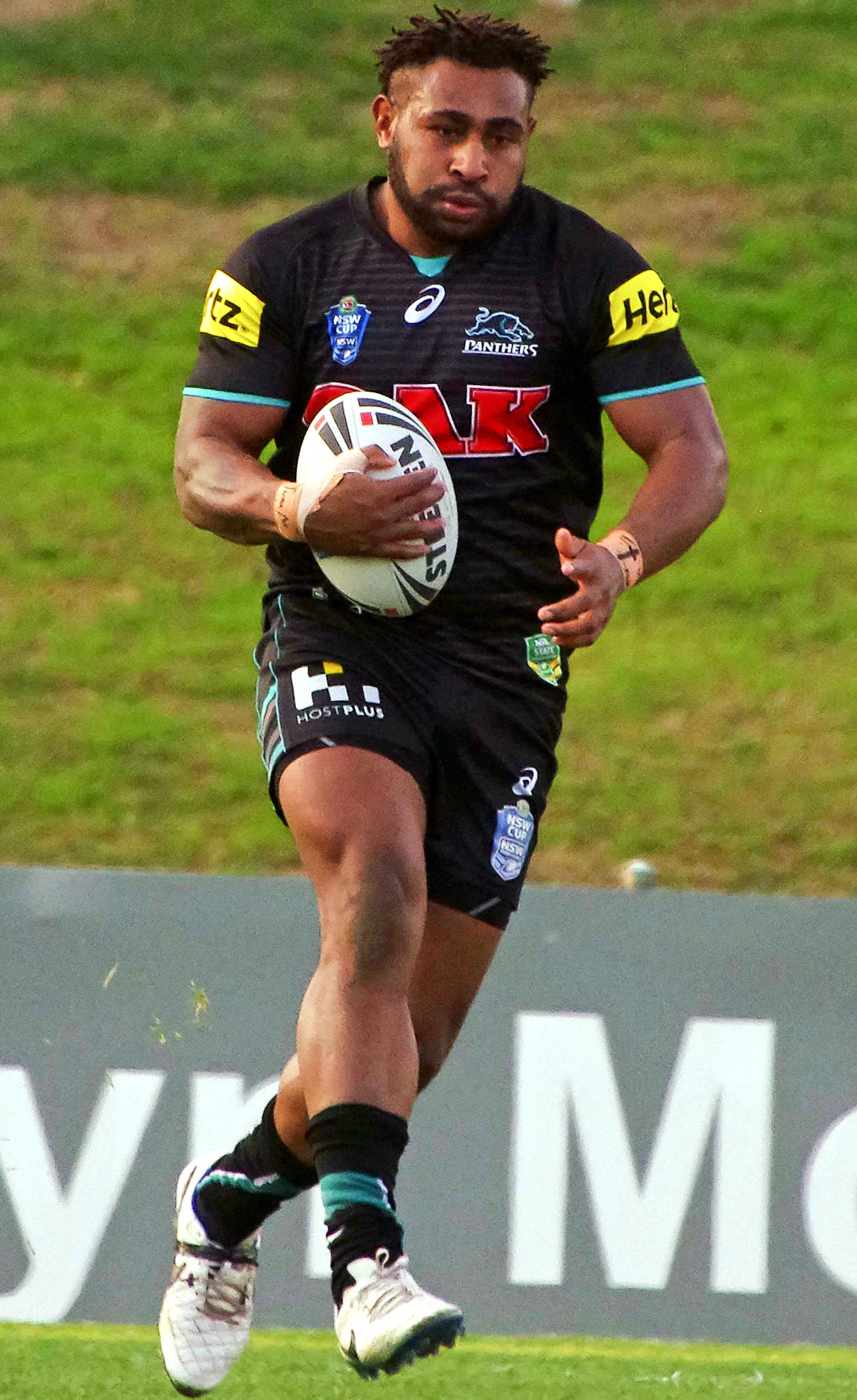

Personal information
- Born: 15 September 1995 (age 31) Mendi, Southern Highlands Province, Papua New Guinea
- Height: 6 ft 1 in (1.85 m)
- Weight: 16 st 7 lb (105 kg)

Playing information
- Position: Prop, Lock
Club
Years	Team	Pld	T	G	FG	P
2017–18	PNG Hunters	47	7	0	0	28
2018	Widnes Vikings	1	0	0	0	0
2018(DR)	North Wales Crusaders	4	0	0	0	0
2019–21	PNG Hunters	16	0	0	0	0
	Total	68	7	0	0	28
Representative
Years	Team	Pld	T	G	FG	P
2014	PNG Prime Minister's XIII	1	0	0	0	0
2015–19	Papua New Guinea	9	1	0	0	4
- Source: As of 10 November 2023
- Relatives: Wellington Albert (brother)
Medals
Men's rugby league nines
Representing Papua New Guinea
Commonwealth Games
Gold medal – first place	2014 Glasgow	Exhibition

Stanton Albert (born 1995) is a Papua New Guinean professional rugby league footballer who last played as a prop or lock for the PNG Hunters in the Queensland Cup and Papua New Guinea at international level. His whereabouts are unknown.

He previously played for the Widnes Vikings in the Super League. He is the younger brother of fellow PNG player Wellington Albert.

== Early life ==
Albert was born in Mendi, Papua New Guinea. Having dropped out of Mendi High School, Albert returned to high school while contracted to the Penrith Panthers, attending McCarthy Catholic College, Emu Plains as a 19-year old in 2015.

== Playing career ==
Having previously played for the Hela Wigmen in the PNGNRL, Albert started his professional career with the PNG Hunters in 2014, during their inaugural season in the Queensland Cup. In June 2014, Albert represented Papua New Guinea in an under-19s rugby league nines tournament at the 2014 Commonwealth Games; he was named player of the tournament as PNG won gold.

In December 2014, Albert joined his brother Wellington at the Penrith Panthers by a signing a two-year contract with the club. He played for their National Youth Competition team in 2015, and also played in their New South Wales Cup team.

Albert returned to the Hunters in 2017, and was a member of their grand final winning team. He played against his former club, the Penrith Panthers, in the 2017 State Championship.

In January 2018, Albert signed a two-year contract with the Widnes Vikings in the Super League, once again alongside his brother Wellington. He was dual-registered to play for the North Wales Crusaders in the third-tier League 1 competition, where he played 4 matches. Albert made his first and only appearance for Widnes Vikings in their Challenge Cup match against League 1 side the Coventry Bears. Albert was released by Widnes in May 2018 on compassionate grounds, and subsequently rejoined the PNG Hunters.
