= Adex Wera =

Papua New Guinean rugby league footballer

Personal information
- Born: 18 May 1990 (age 36) Papua New Guinea
- Height: 177 cm (5 ft 10 in)
- Weight: 90 kg (14 st 2 lb)

Playing information
- Position: Centre
Club
| Years | Team | Pld | T | G | FG | P |
|---|---|---|---|---|---|---|
| 2014–19 | PNG Hunters | 115 | 53 | 0 | 0 | 212 |
Representative
| Years | Team | Pld | T | G | FG | P |
| 2013–14 | PNG Prime Minister's XIII | 2 | 0 | 0 | 0 | 0 |
| 2014–17 | Papua New Guinea | 3 | 1 | | | 4 |
Medals
Men's rugby league nines
Representing Papua New Guinea
Pacific Games
| Gold medal – first place | 2015 Port Moresby | Team |

Adex Wera (born 1990) is a Papua New Guinean former professional rugby league footballer who last played for and captained the Papua New Guinea Hunters in the Queensland Cup. He has represented the Papua New Guinea national team.

Wera played for the PNG Hunters in their first match in the Intrust Super Cup in 2014 (against Redcliffe Dolphins). In 2018, he became second player at the Hunters to reach 100 appearances in the competition.
