= Watson Boas =

Papua New Guinean international rugby league footballer

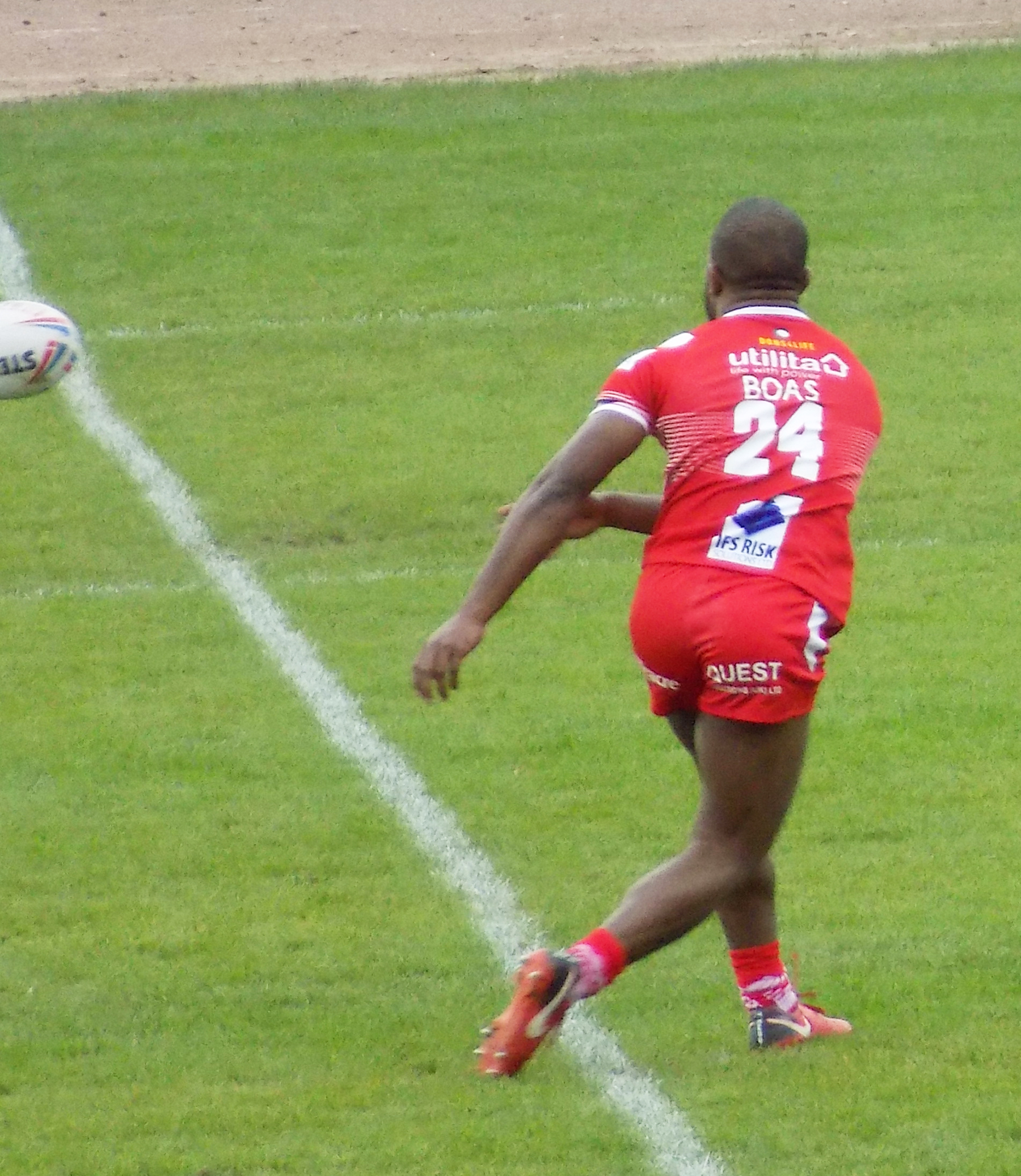

Personal information
- Born: 8 November 1994 (age 31) Madang, Madang Province, Papua New Guinea
- Height: 5 ft 9 in (176 cm)
- Weight: 13 st 5 lb (85 kg)

Playing information
- Position: Scrum-half
Club
Years	Team	Pld	T	G	FG	P
2016–18	PNG Hunters	65	20	10	0	100
2019	Featherstone Rovers	11	4	14	0	44
2020–	Doncaster	95	37	12	0	172
2021(DR)	→ PNG Hunters	5	1	0	0	4
	Total	176	62	36	0	320
Representative
Years	Team	Pld	T	G	FG	P
2015	PNG Prime Minister's XIII	1	1	0	0	4
2016–	Papua New Guinea	12	6	0	0	24
2019–	Papua New Guinea 9s	3	1	0	0	4
- Source: As of 29 June 2026
- Relatives: Ase Boas (brother)
Medals
Men's rugby league nines
Representing Papua New Guinea
Pacific Games
Gold medal – first place	2015 Port Moresby	Team

Watson Boas (born 8 November 1994) is a Papua New Guinean professional rugby league footballer who plays as a scrum-half for Doncaster in the Championship and for Papua New Guinea at international level.

He previously played for Featherstone Rovers in the Championship, PNG Hunters in the Queensland Cup, and represented the Papua New Guinean national team, most notably at the 2017 World Cup and 2021 World Cup.

== Background ==
Boas was born in Madang, Madang, Papua New Guinea.

== Playing career ==
Boas previously played for the Agmark Gurias in the PNGNRL and Royals club in East New Britain Rugby League. He is the younger brother of fellow PNG representative Ase Boas. Since his first cap in 2016, Boas has played many fixtures for the Papua New Guinea national rugby league team.

His natural athletic ability saw him garner interest from English Rugby League One side, Featherstone Rovers. However his big break in England, came through a successful loan spell at Doncaster. Playing a part in their promotion to League One at the conclusion of the 2018–2019 season. Doncaster then signed Boas on a two-year permanent deal. Watson got a three-year extension on his contract and will be with the Dons until the end of the 2025 season.

International caps
Cap	Date	Venue	Opponent	Competition	T	G	FG	Points
1	7 May 2016	Parramatta Stadium, Sydney	Fiji		2	0	0	8
2	6 May 2017	Leichhardt Oval, Sydney	Cook Islands		0	0	0	0
3	28 October 2017	PNG Football Stadium, Port Moresby	Wales	2017 World Cup	0	0	0	0
4	5 November 2017	PNG Football Stadium, Port Moresby	Ireland	2017 World Cup	1	0	0	4
5	12 November 2017	PNG Football Stadium, Port Moresby	United States	2017 World Cup	1	0	0	4
6	19 November 2017	Melbourne Rectangular Stadium, Melbourne	England	2017 World Cup	0	0	0	0
7	23 June 2018	Campbelltown Stadium, Sydney	Fiji		0	0	0	0
8	9 November 2019	Rugby League Park, Christchurch	Fiji		1	0	0	4
9	16 November 2019	National Football Stadium, Port Moresby	Great Britain		1	0	0	4
