= Enock Maki =

PNG international rugby league footballer

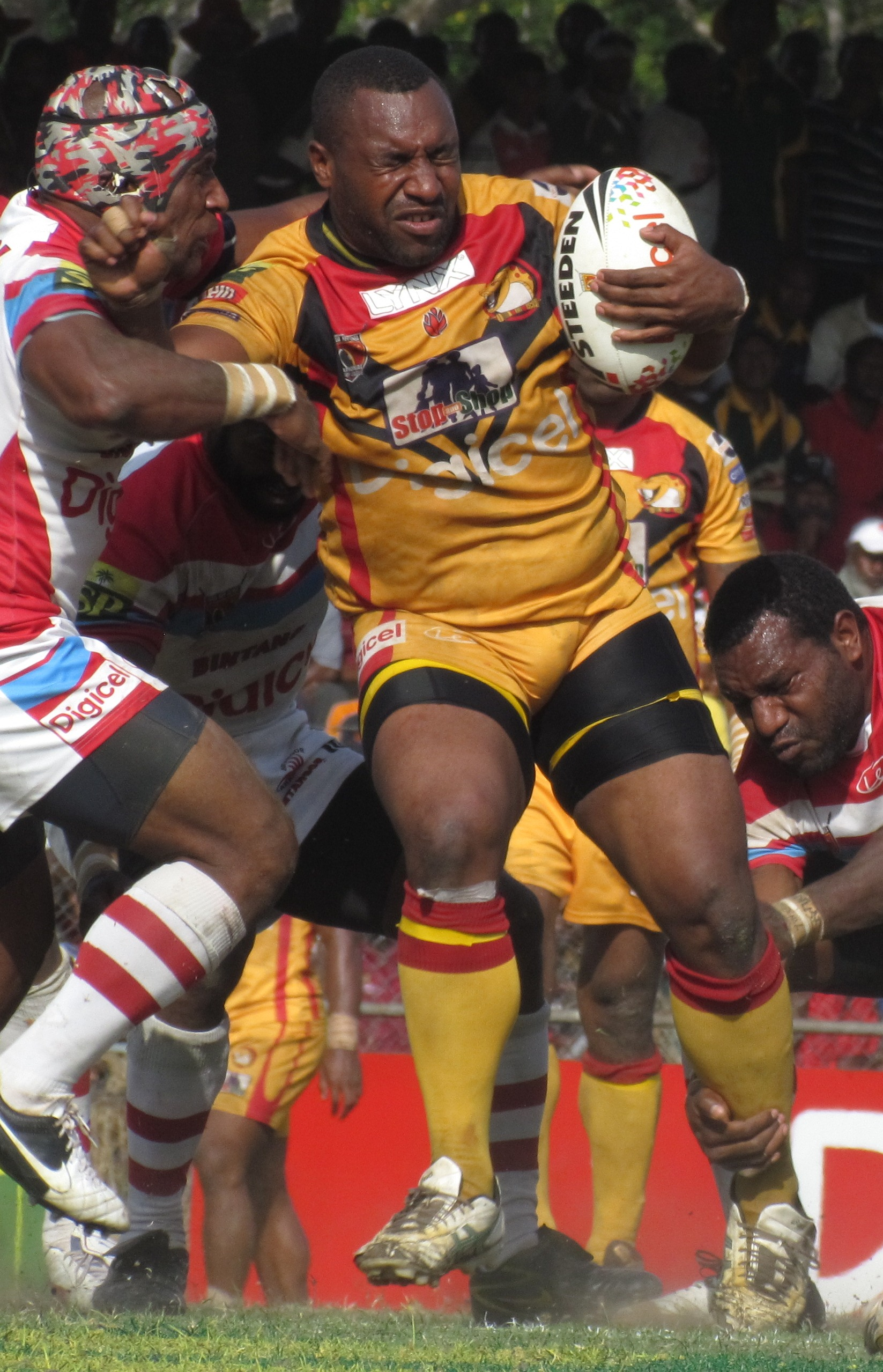

Personal information
- Born: 9 December 1989 (age 36) Mount Hagen, Papua New Guinea
- Height: 180 cm (5 ft 11 in)
- Weight: 105 kg (16 st 7 lb)

Playing information
- Position: Prop
Club
Years	Team	Pld	T	G	FG	P
2014–21	PNG Hunters	100	3	0	0	12
Representative
Years	Team	Pld	T	G	FG	P
2012–13	PNG Prime Minister's XIII	2	0	0	0	0
2013–19	Papua New Guinea	6	1	0	0	0
- Source: As of 9 November 2023

Enock Maki (born 9 December 1989) is a Papua New Guinean rugby league footballer who previously played prop for the PNG Hunters in the Intrust Super Cup and also represented Papua New Guinea in the 2013 World Cup and 2017 Rugby League World Cup.

== Background ==
Enock comes from the Western Highlands Province of Papua New Guinea in a small village called Keltiga outside the provincial capital Mount Hagen. He is the third child in a family of four, his older brothers are Wilson and Junior Maki. Wilson Maki played for Mount Hagen Eagles in 2003, and was forced to quit due to injuries. Enock followed soon after and with his build he caught the eyes of the Eagles selectors and in 2008 he was the sought after player in the Digicel Cup competition.

== Playing career ==
He currently plays for the PNG Hunters in the Intrust Super Cup as a prop, he previously played for the Port Moresby Vipers in PNG. Enock started playing rugby while he was in primary school. Because he was taller and bigger than his peers he was often asked to play with senior players older than him. When he wanted to play with his own age group he was often rejected as they saw him bigger in height and built. In 2007 he caught the eyes of Eagles coach Joe Tep during a pre-season competition in the urban league of Mt Hagen. Joe Tep was asked by the management of Eagles to put together a strong train on squad for the 2008 Digicel Cup competition and Enock's hard ball running and at only 17 he was on top of the list along with Dion Aiye. The boys got their break to make the Eagles train on squad then to progress on to make the Eagles team. The team entered the 2008 season as hot favorites because it was composed entirely of players as young as 17- and 18-year-olds.

Enock had a very high completion rate and in his début year he was amongst the highest ranking forwards in the competition. He was a hot favorite in the 2008 Rugby League World Cup but missed out narrowly to the more experienced players. From Mount Hagen he then moved to Port Moresby to attend university where he was enrolled at the University of Papua New Guinea and the Masta Mak Rangers where the quick ones to grab him. He continued his outstanding performance with the Rangers before moving to the Hela Wigmen, after a year with the Wigmen club he was offered an opportunity with the Port Moresby Vipers. Without hesitation he grabbed the opportunity to play for Vipers. He was started from the bench but due to his outstanding ability to play full 80 minutes he was the most preferred starting prop.

In 2013 Enock was instrumental in leading the Port Moresby Vipers to the grand final in which they played against the competition favorites Goroka Lahanis. The Vipers’ dominated the game for the full 80 minutes and won the game 36–10. His specialized position is prop-forward usually wearing the number 8 jersey.
