= Stargroth Amean =

Papua New Guinean international rugby league footballer

Personal information
- Born: 1991 (age 33–34); Wabag, Enga Province, Papua New Guinea
- Height: 180 cm (5 ft 11 in)
- Weight: 90 kg (14 st 2 lb)

Playing information
- Position: Fullback, Wing
Club
Years	Team	Pld	T	G	FG	P
2015–18	PNG Hunters	64	36	0	0	144
2019–20	Barrow Raiders	25	11	0	0	44
2020–	Port Moresby Vipers	0	0	0	0	0
	Total	89	47	0	0	188
Representative
Years	Team	Pld	T	G	FG	P
2016–19	Papua New Guinea	7	3	0	0	12
2019–	Papua New Guinea 9s	2	1	0	0	4
- Source: As of 20 October 2019
Medals
Men's rugby league nines
Representing Papua New Guinea
Pacific Games
Gold medal – first place	2015 Port Moresby	Team

Stargroth Amean (born 1991) is a Papua New Guinean professional rugby league footballer who plays for the Port Moresby Vipers. He was unable to return to the UK citing family reasons to play for Barrow Raiders in 2020 but remained under contract. He was part of the PNG Hunters team in 2017 which won the Queensland Cup. Primarily playing as a fullback, Amean has represented the Papua New Guinean national team, most notably at the 2017 World Cup and the 2019 World Cup 9s.

Stargroth's last match for PNG Hunters was on 1 April 2018 against Tweed Heads Seagulls in front of his home crowd in Port Moresby. Amean quit the Hunters to start his foundation year of the Bachelor of Science programme at the University of Papua New Guinea in 2018.

== Early life ==
Amean was born in Wabag, Enga Province in Papua New Guinea. He played his junior rugby league for the Paga Panthers. He claims to be named after a Spanish actor.

== Playing career ==
Amean was signed by the Hela Wigmen in PNG's domestic competition for the 2011 season. He joined the Port Moresby Vipers the following year, but injuries to both legs meant he couldn't take the field between late 2012 and mid-2014. His form with the Vipers saw him join the Hunters in the Queensland Cup.

In 2019 Amean signed for the Barrow Raiders playing mainly as a centre. Following the 2019 season Amean signed a two-year contract extension with the Raiders, unfortunately due to personal circumstances he was unable to return and re-signed with the Port Moresby Vipers.

International caps
Cap	Date	Venue	Opponent	Competition	T	G	FG	Points
1	7 May 2016	Parramatta Stadium, Sydney	Fiji		0	0	0	0
2	6 May 2017	Leichhardt Oval, Sydney	Cook Islands		2	0	0	8
3	5 November 2017	PNG Football Stadium, Port Moresby	Ireland	2017 World Cup	0	0	0	0
4	12 November 2017	PNG Football Stadium, Port Moresby	United States	2017 World Cup	1	0	0	4
5	19 November 2017	Melbourne Rectangular Stadium, Melbourne	England	2017 World Cup Q/Final	0	0	0	0
