= Willie Minoga =

PNG international rugby league footballer

Personal information
- Full name: Willie Minoga
- Born: 17 September 1987 (age 39) Wapenamanda, Enga Province, Papua New Guinea
- Height: 182 cm (6 ft 0 in)
- Weight: 100 kg (15 st 10 lb)

Playing information
- Position: Prop
Club
Years	Team	Pld	T	G	FG	P
2014–15	PNG Hunters	25	0	0	0	0
2016	Townsville Blackhawks	21	3	0	0	12
2017–19	PNG Hunters	46	18	0	0	72
2019	Barrow Raiders	11	0	0	0	0
	Total	103	21	0	0	84
Representative
Years	Team	Pld	T	G	FG	P
2014–16	PNG Prime Minister's XIII	2	0	0	0	0
2015–	Papua New Guinea	5	0	0	0	0
- As of 9 November 2023
Medals
Men's rugby league nines
Representing Papua New Guinea
Pacific Games
Gold medal – first place	2015 Port Moresby	Team

Willie Minoga (born 17 September 1987) in Wapenamanda, Enga Province is a Papua New Guinean professional rugby league footballer who played for the Barrow Raiders in the Championship. He rejoined the Papua New Guinea Hunters at the end of 2016 after spending one season playing for the Townsville Blackhawks in the same competition. A Papua New Guinean national representative, Minoga was selected in PNG's squad for the 2017 World Cup.

At a very early age, he used to play for his schoolboy's rugby team while he was attending St.Paul's Lutheran Secondary School in the Minamb Valley, Enga Province in the years 2010-2012. He then joined Timin Tara, a local rugby team in the Minamb Rugby League. From there, he was directly invited by the Lae Snax Tigers coach Stanley Tepend for training. He played with the Lae Snax Tigers before he was selected for the PNG Hunters. Story by: Kawaii Stan (Kepaku Warriors)

== Playing career ==
Minoga scored the match-winning try for the PNG Hunters in the 2017 Queensland Cup Grand Final against the Sunshine Coast Falcons.
