= Ase Boas =

PNG international rugby league footballer

Personal information
- Born: 26 December 1988 (age 37) Simbu, Papua New Guinea
- Height: 5 ft 10 in (177 cm)
- Weight: 90 kg (14 st 2 lb)

Playing information
- Position: Five-eighth
Club
Years	Team	Pld	T	G	FG	P
2015–18	PNG Hunters	89	33	174	1	481
2019	Featherstone Rovers	5	1	2	0	8
2019–21	PNG Hunters	27	0	44	1	89
	Total	121	34	220	2	578
Representative
Years	Team	Pld	T	G	FG	P
2013–16	PNG Prime Minister's XIII	2	0	0	0	0
2013–18	Papua New Guinea	7	0	11	0	22
- Source: As of 9 November 2023
- Relatives: Watson Boas (brother)
Medals
Men's rugby league nines
Representing Papua New Guinea
Pacific Games
Gold medal – first place	2015 Port Moresby	Team competition

Ase Boas (born 1988) is a Papua New Guinean rugby league international footballer who plays for Rabaul Gurias. A Papua New Guinean representative five-eighth, Boas previously played for Featherstone Rovers in the Championship. He was a member of PNG's squads at the 2013 and 2017 World Cup tournaments.

== Playing career ==
Boas was the captain for the PNG Hunters in the 2017 Queensland Cup season where they won the title. He previously played for the Rabaul Gurias in the PNG domestic competition, which he captained to premiership victory in 2012 before joining the Hunters in 2015. He is the elder brother of fellow PNG representative Watson Boas.

Boas comes from a mixed parentage of East New Britain, Oro and Simbu in Papua New Guinea.

Boas represented Papua New Guinea in rugby league nines at the 2015 Pacific Games.

Boas signed with Featherstone Rovers for the 2019 season, alongside his brother Watson. He was released for personal reasons after making five appearances for the club.

International caps
Cap	Date	Venue	Opponent	Competition	T	G	FG	Points
1	27 October 2013	Craven Park, Hull	France	2013 World Cup	0	0	0	0
2	7 May 2016	Parramatta Stadium, Sydney	Fiji		0	4/5	0	8
3	6 May 2017	Leichhardt Oval, Sydney	Cook Islands		0	6/6	0	12
4	28 October 2017	PNG Football Stadium, Port Moresby	Wales	2017 World Cup	0	0/2	0	0
5	5 November 2017	PNG Football Stadium, Port Moresby	Ireland	2017 World Cup	0	1/1	0	2
6	19 November 2017	Melbourne Rectangular Stadium, Melbourne	England	2017 World Cup	0	0	0	0
7	23 June 2018	Campbelltown Stadium, Sydney	Fiji		0	0	0	0
