= International rugby league in 2019 =

A list of men and women international rugby league matches played throughout 2019 and does not include wheelchair rugby league international matches. A † denotes a recognised, but unofficial match that did not contribute to the RLIF World Rankings.

== Rankings ==
IRL Men's World Rankings
Official rankings as of December 2018
Rank	Change*	Team	Pts%
1	Steady	Australia	100.00
2	▲1	England	92.14
3	▼1	New Zealand	88.55
4	Steady	Tonga	45.14
5	Steady	Fiji	29.41
6	▲2	France	26.11
7	▼1	Samoa	24.28
8	▼1	Scotland	20.36
9	Steady	Lebanon	18.93
10	Steady	Papua New Guinea	15.78
11	▲1	Wales	11.40
12	▼1	Ireland	10.70
13	Steady	Italy	7.90
14	▲1	Jamaica	6.39
15	▼1	United States	6.15
16	▲2	Malta	5.98
17	Steady	Serbia	5.76
18	▲3	Hungary	5.53
19	▲7	Greece	4.78
20	▼1	Norway	4.74
21	▼5	Canada	4.14
22	▲5	Philippines	3.89
23	New entry	Poland	3.39
24	▲10	Niue	3.21
25	▼1	Czech Republic	2.89
26	▲2	Netherlands	2.82
27	▲15	Solomon Islands	2.56
28	▼6	Spain	2.46
29	▼9	Russia	2.37
30	Steady	Germany	2.18
31	New entry	Turkey	2.14
32	▲1	Chile	2.05
33	▲3	Vanuatu	1.95
34	▲7	Japan	1.87
35	▼10	Ukraine	1.79
36	▲1	El Salvador	1.66
37	▼5	South Africa	1.53
38	▼9	Sweden	1.48
39	▼16	Belgium	1.31
40	▲5	Hong Kong	1.29
41	▼1	Colombia	1.08
42	▼4	Thailand	1.06
43	▼4	Argentina	0.90
44	▼13	Cook Islands	0.75
45	▼10	Denmark	0.56
46	▼3	Brazil	0.51
47	▼3	Uruguay	0.47
48	▼2	Bulgaria	0.21
49	▼2	Latvia	0.07
*Change from July 2018
Complete rankings at INTRL.SPORT

== March ==
=== El Salvador men vs Nicaragua ===
23 March 2019
15:00 CST (UTC−06)

El Salvador	Cancelled	Nicaragua
	Source

Indes Sports Complex, Santa Ana

== April ==
=== Ireland A men vs Norway ===
6 April 2019
15:00 IST (UTC+01)

Ireland A	44 – 14†	Norway

Gormanston Park, Dublin
Referee: Eamonn Whelan (Ireland)

== May ==
=== European Championship C ===
Championship Final

18 May 2019
13:00 BST (UTC+01:00)

Greece	56–26	Norway
Tries: Mamouzelos (4), Constantinou (2), Nianiakas (2), Kartsonakis, Tuliatu; Goals: Meads (7/8), Bastas (1/1), Mamouzelos (0/1)	Report	Tries: Diggs (2), Borsheim, Milligan, Nordtun; Goals: Nordtun (2/4), Cummins (1/1)

New River Stadium, London
Attendance: 608
Referee: Cameron Worsley (England)
Touch judges: Shane Daniel (England), Joe Turner (England)

Team details

FB	1	Terry Constantinou
WG	2	Ioannis Nake
CE	3	Konstantinos Katsidonis
CE	4	Dimosthenis Kartsonakis
WG	5	Nikolaos Kourkakis
FE	6	Nikolaos Bosmos
HB	7	Jordan Meads (c)
PR	8	Stefanos Bastas
HK	9	Peter Mamouzelos
PR	12	Ioannis Rousoglou
SR	11	Theodoros Nianiakas
SR	10	Grigoris Koutsimpogiorgos
LK	13	Robert Tuliatu
Interchange:
BE	14	Aris Dardamanis
BE	15	Pantelis Tsattalios
BE	17	Ioannis Dimakas
BE	18	Giorgos Tsiakos
Coach:
Jim Pizanias

FB	1	Stephen Mwikaria
WG	2	Casey Diggs
CE	3	Kristoffer Borsheim
CE	4	Fredrik Nordtun
WG	5	Bendik Kalvik
FE	6	Nathan Cummins
HB	7	Simon Viljoen
PR	8	Sam Mullins
HK	9	Kristoffer Milligan (c)
PR	10	Ezra McIntyre
SR	11	Nils Kristian Holte
SR	12	Kristian Nordin-Skipnes
LK	13	Brett Harvey
Interchange:
BE	14	Sonny Mellor
BE	15	Christoffer Stalsberg
BE	16	Lucas Zuniga
BE	17	Josh Skidmore-Hornby
Coach:
Dave Hunter

=== Turkey women vs Italy ===
18 May 2019
18:00 TRT (UTC+03)

Turkey	18 – 14	Italy
Tries: Açıkgöz, Gül, Korku; Goals: Açıkgöz (3/3)	Report	Tries: Iozzia, Menotti, Pinarello; Goals: Virgili (1/3)

Beylerbeyi Stadium, Istanbul
Referee: Vladan Kikanović (Serbia)

== June ==
=== World Cup qualification – Repechage ===
Play-off qualifier

21 June 2019
19:00 AEST (UTC+10:00)

Cook Islands	66–6	South Africa
Tries: Ulberg (3), Niukore (2), R. Rennie (2), Dargan, E. Noovao, Puna, V. Rennie, Teroi; Goals: Marsters (9/12)		Tries: Turner; Goals: Cryer (1/1)

Ringrose Park, Sydney
Attendance: 2,621
Referee: Peter Gough (Australia)
Touch judges: Adam Cassidy (Australia), Darian Furner (Australia)
Player of the Match: Vincent Rennie (Cook Islands)

Team details

FB	1	Kayal Iro
WG	2	Paul Ulberg
CE	3	Marata Niukore
CE	4	Reubenn Rennie
WG	5	Steven Marsters
FE	6	Brad Takairangi (c)
HB	7	Troy Dargan
PR	8	Sam Mataora
HK	9	Aaron Teroi
PR	10	Tepai Moeroa
SR	14	Vincent Rennie
SR	12	Reuben Porter
LK	13	Pride Petterson-Robati
Interchange:
BE	11	Brody Tamarua
BE	15	Eli Noovao
BE	16	Moses Noovao-McGreal
BE	17	John Puna
Coach:
Tony Iro

FB	1	Will Smith Jnr
WG	2	Keegan Turner
CE	3	Byron Hutchinson
CE	4	Esje Esterhuizen
WG	5	Darren O'Donovan
FE	6	Bevan De Vries
HB	7	Kam Cryer (c)
PR	8	Joel Tubbs
HK	9	Edward Proudler
PR	10	Ashley Bull
SR	11	Shane Gillham (c)
SR	12	Ayden Perry
LK	13	Jonathan Soares
Interchange:
BE	14	Jason King
BE	15	Seth Buckley
BE	18	Louis Musson
BE	20	Allan Kasselman
Coach:
Jon Wilson

Play-off

16 November 2019
17:00 ET (UTC−04:00)

United States	16–38	Cook Islands
Tries: Faraimo, Howard, Shipway; Goals: Faraimo (2/3)	Report	Tries: Dargan (2), Arona, Gelling, Glenn, R. Rennie, V. Rennie; Goals: Marsters (5/7)

Hodges Stadium, Jacksonville
Attendance: 150
Referee: Scott Mikalauskas (England)
Touch judges: Peter Tapper (Jamaica), Kemoy White (Jamaica)

Team details

FB	1	Corey Makelim
WG	2	Ryan Burroughs
CE	3	Bureta Faraimo
CE	4	Elijah Ieriko
WG	5	Jamil Robinson
FE	6	Rory Humphreys
HB	7	Connor Donehue
PR	14	Mark Offerdahl (c)
HK	9	Kristian Freed
PR	15	Sonny Pettybourne
SR	11	Matt Shipway
SR	12	Daniel Howard
LK	13	Eddy Pettybourne
Interchange:
BE	10	Tim Stubbs
BE	17	Joe Eichner
BE	18	Charlie Jones
BE	19	Kevin Reed Jr
Coach:
Sean Rutgerson

FB	1	Kayal Iro
WG	2	Paul Ulberg
CE	3	Reubenn Rennie
CE	4	Anthony Gelling
WG	5	Steven Marsters
FE	6	Brad Takairangi
HB	7	Troy Dargan
PR	8	Sam Mataora
HK	9	Aaron Teroi
PR	10	Vincent Rennie
SR	11	Alex Glenn (c)
SR	12	Marata Niukore
LK	13	Dominique Peyroux (yellow card)
Interchange:
BE	14	Moses Noovao-McGreal
BE	15	Adam Tangata
BE	16	Uiti Baker
BE	17	Tevin Arona
Coach:
Tony Iro

=== Oceania Cup ===
==== Group A ====
Team	Pld	W	D	L	PF	PA	+/−	Pts
Australia	2	1	0	1	38	20	+18	2
New Zealand	2	1	0	1	38	40	−2	2
Tonga	2	1	0	1	30	46	−16	2

22 June 2019
17:40 NZST (UTC+12)

New Zealand	34–14	Tonga
Tries: 6 Johnson 30', 40', 44'; Smith 12'; Hughes 61'; Manu 68'; Goals: 5 Marsters 13', 31', 45', 63', 69' (5/6)	1st: 16–4; 2nd: 18–10 report	Tries: 3 Kata 22'; Taukeiaho 73'; Tupou 77'; Goals: 1 Taukeiaho 74' (1/2); Staggs (0/1)

Mount Smart Stadium, Auckland
Attendance: 23,624
Referee: Ben Cummins (Australia)
Video referee: Steve Chiddy (Australia)
Touch judges: Chris McMillan (New Zealand), Chris Sutton (Australia)

Team details
New Zealand		Position	Tonga
Name	Number	Position	Number	Name
Roger Tuivasa-Sheck	1	FB	1	William Hopoate (c)
Ken Maumalo	2	WG	2	David Fusitu'a
Esan Marsters	3	CE	3	Kotoni Staggs
Joseph Manu	4	CE	4	Solomone Kata
Dallin Watene-Zelezniak (c)	5	WG	5	Daniel Tupou
Shaun Johnson	6	FE	6	John Asiata
Benji Marshall	7	HB	7	Tuimoala Lolohea
Jesse Bromwich	8	PR	10	Sio Siua Taukeiaho
Brandon Smith	9	HK	9	Siliva Havili
Jared Waerea-Hargreaves	10	PF	10	Addin Fonua-Blake
Kenny Bromwich	11	SR	11	Tevita Pangai Junior
Briton Nikora	12	SR	12	Manu Ma'u
Isaac Liu	13	LK	13	Jason Taumalolo (c)
Jahrome Hughes	14	IN	14	Manase Fainu
Leeson Ah Mau	15	IN	16	Peni Terepo
Nelson Asofa-Solomona	16	IN	17	Sitili Tupouniua
James Fisher-Harris	17	IN	19	Tevita Tatola
(Australia) Michael Maguire		Coach		(Australia) Kristian Woolf
NRL.com

Notes:

- Jahrome Hughes, Briton Nikora (both New Zealand), Manase Fainu, Kotoni Staggs, and Sitili Tupouniua (all Tonga) made their Test debuts, while John Asiata made his debut for Tonga having previously represented Samoa.

25 October 2019
20:10 AEDT (UTC+11)

Australia	26–4	New Zealand
Tries: Addo-Carr, Cook, Frizell, Tedesco; Goals: Mitchell (4/5), Cherry-Evans (1/1)	Report	Tries: Nicoll-Klokstad; Goals: Johnson (0/1)

WIN Stadium, Wollongong
Attendance: 18,104
Referee: Gerard Sutton (Australia)

Team details

FB	1	James Tedesco
WG	2	Josh Addo-Carr
CE	3	Latrell Mitchell
CE	4	Jack Wighton
WG	5	Nick Cotric
FE	6	Cameron Munster
HB	7	Daly Cherry-Evans
PR	8	Josh Papalii
HK	9	Damien Cook
PR	10	David Klemmer
SR	11	Boyd Cordner (c)
SR	12	Tyson Frizell
LK	13	Jake Trbojevic
Interchange:
BE	14	Ben Hunt
BE	15	Payne Haas
BE	16	Paul Vaughan
BE	17	Wade Graham
Coach:
Mal Meninga

FB	1	Roger Tuivasa-Sheck
WG	2	Ken Maumalo
CE	3	Charnze Nicoll-Klokstad
CE	4	Joseph Manu
WG	5	Jamayne Isaako
FE	6	Shaun Johnson
HB	7	Benji Marshall (c)
PR	8	Leeson Ah Mau
HK	9	Brandon Smith
PR	10	Jared Waerea-Hargreaves
SR	11	Briton Nikora
SR	12	Kenny Bromwich
LK	13	Adam Blair
Interchange:
BE	14	Jahrome Hughes
BE	15	Zane Tetevano
BE	16	Braden Hamlin-Uele
BE	17	Corey Harawira-Naera
Coach:
Michael Maguire

Man of the Match:
Damien Cook (Australia)

Touch judges:
Nick Beashel (Australia)
Dave Munro (Australia)
Video referees:
Ben Galea (Australia)
Jared Maxwell (Australia)

Notes:

- Josh Addo-Carr, Nick Cotric, Payne Haas, Jack Wighton (all Australia), Braden Hamlin-Uele, and Corey Harawira-Naera (both New Zealand) made their Test debuts, while Paul Vaughan made his debut for Australia having previously represented Italy, and Charnze Nicoll-Klokstad and Zane Tetevano made their debut for New Zealand both having previously represented the Cook Islands.

2 November 2019
19:40 NZDT (UTC+13)

Tonga	16–12	Australia
Tries: Hopoate, Jennings, Pangai Junior; Goals: Staggs (2/4)	Report	Tries: Wighton, Vaughan; Goals: Mitchell (2/2)

Eden Park, Auckland
Attendance: 25,257
Referee: Gerard Sutton (Australia)

Team details

FB	1	William Hopoate
WG	2	David Fusitu'a
CE	3	Michael Jennings
CE	4	Konrad Hurrell
WG	5	Daniel Tupou
FE	6	Tuimoala Lolohea
HB	21	Kotoni Staggs
PR	15	Addin Fonua-Blake
HK	9	Siliva Havili
PR	10	Sio Siua Taukeiaho (c)
SR	11	Ben Murdoch-Masila
SR	12	Manu Ma'u
LK	13	Jason Taumalolo (c)
Interchange:
BE	8	Andrew Fifita
BE	14	Sione Katoa
BE	19	Tevita Pangai Junior
BE	20	Joe Ofahengaue
Coach:
Kristian Woolf

FB	1	James Tedesco
WG	2	Josh Addo-Carr
CE	3	Latrell Mitchell
CE	4	Jack Wighton
WG	5	Nick Cotric
FE	6	Cameron Munster
HB	7	Daly Cherry-Evans
PR	8	Josh Papalii
HK	9	Damien Cook
PR	10	David Klemmer
SR	11	Boyd Cordner (c)
SR	12	Tyson Frizell
LK	13	Jake Trbojevic
Interchange:
BE	14	Cameron Murray
BE	15	Payne Haas
BE	16	Paul Vaughan
BE	17	Wade Graham
Coach:
Mal Meninga

Touch judges:
Nick Beashel (Australia)
Dave Munro (Australia)
Video referee:
Jared Maxwell (Australia)

Notes:

- Cameron Murray (Australia) made his Test debut.

==== Group B ====
Team	Pld	W	D	L	PF	PA	+/−	Pts
Fiji	2	2	0	0	66	38	+28	4
Samoa	2	1	0	1	42	50	−8	2
Papua New Guinea	2	0	0	2	26	46	−20	0

22 June 2019
19:55 AEST (UTC+10)

Papua New Guinea	6–24	Samoa
Tries: Wapi; Goals: Martin (1/1)	report	Tries: Aloiai, Harris-Tavita, Luai, Paulo; Goals: Isaako (4/4)

Leichhardt Oval, Sydney
Attendance: 8,408
Referee: Adam Gee (Australia)

Team details

FB	1	Edene Gebbie
WG	2	Junior Rau
CE	3	Bernard Lewis
CE	4	Xavier Coates
WG	5	Terry Wapi
FE	6	Edwin Ipape
HB	7	Kyle Laybutt
PR	8	Enock Maki
HK	9	James Segeyaro (c)
PR	10	Luke Page
SR	11	Rhyse Martin
SR	12	Nixon Putt
LK	13	Moses Meninga
Interchange:
BE	14	Kurt Baptiste
BE	15	Rhadley Brawa
BE	16	Zev John
BE	17	Stanton Albert
Coach:
Michael Marum

FB	1	Jamayne Isaako
WG	2	Jorge Taufua
CE	3	Hymel Hunt
CE	4	Marion Seve
WG	5	David Nofoaluma
FE	6	Chanel Harris-Tavita
HB	7	Anthony Milford (c)
PR	8	Junior Paulo
HK	9	Jarome Luai
PR	17	Josh Aloiai
SR	11	Raymond Faitala-Mariner
SR	12	Jaydn Su'A
LK	13	Martin Taupau
Interchange:
BE	10	James Gavet
BE	14	Mason Lino
BE	15	Michael Chee-Kam
BE	16	Herman Ese'ese
Coach:
Matt Parish

Touch judges:
Nick Morel (Australia)
David Munro (Australia)
Video referees:
Henry Perenara (New Zealand)
Bryan Norrie (Australia)

Notes:

- Xavier Coates, Edene Gebbie, Edwin Ipape, Zev John, Kyle Laybutt, Bernard Lewis, Terry Wapi (all Papua New Guinea), Chanel Harris-Tavita, Hymel Hunt, Marion Seve, and Jaydn Su'A (all Samoa) made their Test debuts, while Jamayne Isaako made his debut for Samoa having previously represented New Zealand.

2 November 2019
14:20 NZDT (UTC+13)

Samoa	18–44	Fiji
Tries: Taufua (2), Lafai, Mulitalo; Goals: Lafai (1/4)	Report	Tries: Kikau (2), Miller, Lovodua, Lumelume, Naiqama, Ratuvakacereivalu, Wiliame; Goals: Wakeham (5/6), Moceidreke (1/2)

Eden Park, Auckland
Attendance: 25,257
Referee: Grant Atkins (Australia)

Team details

FB	1	Ronaldo Mulitalo
WG	2	Jorge Taufua
CE	3	Tim Lafai
CE	4	Joseph Leilua (c)
WG	5	Brian To'o
FE	6	Marion Seve
HB	7	Jarome Luai
PR	8	Junior Paulo
HK	9	Danny Levi
PR	10	Martin Taupau
SR	11	Tino Fa'asuamaleaui
SR	12	Michael Chee-Kam
LK	14	Dunamis Lui
Interchange:
BE	13	Bunty Afoa
BE	15	Moses Leota
BE	16	Luciano Leilua
BE	17	James Gavet
Coach:
Matt Parish

FB	1	Sitiveni Moceidreke
WG	2	Isaac Lumelume
CE	3	Taane Milne
CE	4	Brayden Wiliame
WG	5	Suliasi Vunivalu
FE	6	Kevin Naiqama (c)
HB	7	Brandon Wakeham
PR	8	Kane Evans
HK	9	Joe Lovodua
PR	10	Tui Kamikamica
SR	11	Viliame Kikau
SR	12	Ben Nakubuwai
LK	13	D'Rhys Miller
Interchange:
BE	14	Lamar Liolevave
BE	15	Joseph Ratuvakacereivalu
BE	18	King Vuniyayawa
BE	19	Penioni Tagituimua
Coach:
Brandon Costin

Touch judges:
Paki Parkinson (New Zealand)
Stephane Vincent (France)
Video referee:
Jared Maxwell (Australia)

Notes:

- Tino Fa'asuamaleaui, Luciano Leilua, Moses Leota, Ronaldo Mulitalo, Brian To'o (all Samoa), Lamar Liolevave, and Joseph Ratuvakacereivalu (both Fiji) made their Test debuts, while Danny Levi made his debut for Samoa having previously represented New Zealand.

9 November 2019
17:20 NZDT (UTC+13)

Fiji	22–20	Papua New Guinea
Tries: Kamikamica, Kikau, Nakubuwai, Wiliame; Goals: Wakeham (3/4)		Tries: Boas, Gebbie, Martin; Goals: Martin (4/4)

Rugby League Park, Christchurch
Attendance: 8,875
Referee: Chris Kendall (England)

Team details

FB	1	Sitiveni Moceidreke
WG	2	Maika Sivo
CE	3	Taane Milne
CE	4	Brayden Wiliame
WG	5	Suliasi Vunivalu
FE	6	Kevin Naiqama (c)
HB	7	Brandon Wakeham
PR	8	Kane Evans
HK	9	Joe Lovodua
PR	10	Tui Kamikamica
SR	11	Viliame Kikau
SR	12	Ben Nakubuwai
LK	13	D'Rhys Miller
Interchange:
BE	14	Lamar Liolevave
BE	15	Joseph Ratuvakacereivalu
BE	18	King Vuniyayawa
BE	19	Penioni Tagituimua
Coach:
Brandon Costin

FB	1	Alex Johnston
WG	2	Edene Gebbie
CE	3	Daniel Russell
CE	4	Justin Olam
WG	5	Terry Wapi
FE	6	Kyle Laybutt
HB	7	Watson Boas
PR	8	Wellington Albert
HK	9	Wartovo Puara
PR	10	Luke Page
SR	11	Nixon Putt
SR	12	Rhyse Martin (c)
LK	13	Moses Meninga
Interchange:
BE	14	Edwin Ipape
BE	15	Stanton Albert
BE	16	Enock Maki
BE	17	Stargroth Amean
Coach:
Michael Marum

Touch judges:
Chris Butler (Australia)
Paki Parkinson (New Zealand)
Video referee:
Shayne Hayne (Australia)

Notes:

- Daniel Russell (Papua New Guinea) made his Test debut, while Alex Johnston made his debut for Papua New Guinea having previously represented Australia.

=== Fiji men vs Lebanon in Australia ===
22 June 2019
17:40 AEST (UTC+10)

Fiji	58 – 14	Lebanon
Tries: Bukuya (2), Sivo (2), Vunivalu (2), Lovodua, Kamikamica, Kikau, Wakeham; Goals: Wakeham (8/9), Roqica (1/1)		Tries: Miski (2), Lichaa; Goals: Maarbani (1/2), Robinson (0/1)

Leichhardt Oval, Sydney
Attendance: 8,408
Referee: Matt Cecchin (Australia)

Team details

FB	1	Marcelo Montoya
WG	2	Suliasi Vunivalu
CE	3	Isaac Lumelume
CE	4	Mikaele Ravalawa
WG	5	Maika Sivo
FE	6	Sitiveni Moceidreke
HB	7	Brandon Wakeham
PR	8	Tui Kamikamica
HK	9	Joe Lovodua
PR	10	Korbin Sims (c)
SR	11	Viliame Kikau
SR	12	Taane Milne
LK	13	Jayson Bukuya
Interchange:
BE	14	D'Rhys Miller
BE	15	Salesi Fainga'a
BE	16	Junior Roqica
BE	17	Penioni Tagituimua
Coach:
Brandon Costin

FB	1	Anthony Layoun
WG	2	Jayden El-Jalkh
CE	3	Bilal Maarbani
CE	4	Allan Lockwood
WG	5	Abbas Miski
FE	6	Reece Robinson
HB	7	Robbie Farah (c)
PR	8	Kayne Kalache
HK	9	Michael Lichaa
PR	10	Tim Mannah
SR	11	Ahmad Ellaz
SR	12	Elie El-Zakhem
LK	13	James Roumanos
Interchange:
BE	14	Jacob Kiraz
BE	15	Jalal Bazzaz
BE	16	Toufic El Hage
BE	17	Nick Kassis
Coach:
Rick Stone

Touch judges:
Ricky MacFarlane (Australia)
Todd Smith (Australia)
Video referees:
Henry Perenara (New Zealand)
Beau Scott (Australia)

Notes:

- This fixture was initially announced as Fiji vs Cook Islands, though the Cook Islands withdrew to play their already planned World Cup qualifying fixture against South Africa.
- Isaac Lumelume, D'Rhys Miller, Mikaele Ravalawa, Maika Sivo, Penioni Tagituimua, Brandon Wakeham (all Fiji), Jalal Bazzaz, Jayden El-Jalkh, Kayne Kalache, Jacob Kiraz, Allan Lockwood, James Roumanos, and Elie El-Zakhem (all Lebanon) made their Test debuts.

=== New Zealand women vs Samoa ===
22 June 2019
15:10 NZST (UTC+12)

New Zealand	46 – 8	Samoa
Tries: Hireme (2), Takairangi (2), Bartlett, Keremete, Maynard, McGregor, Nicholls; Goals: Poko (4/8), Nicholls (1/1)	Report	Tries: Ale, Fineaso-Levi; Goals: Lemanu (0/2)

Mount Smart Stadium, Auckland
Referee: Paki Parkinson (New Zealand)

=== Fiji women vs Papua New Guinea in Australia ===
22 June 2019
15:40 AEST (UTC+10)

Papua New Guinea	0 – 28	Fiji
	Report	Tries: Raikadroka (2), Hartigan, Radiniyavuni, Rokomarama; Goals: Naitokatoka (4/5)

Leichhardt Oval, Sydney
Referee: Kasey Badger (Australia)

=== Italy women vs Serbia ===
22 June 2019
18:00 CEST (UTC+02)

Italy	26 – 0	Serbia
Tries: Neri (2), Gavagna, Stucchi, Piva; Goals: Gavagna (3/5)	Report

Bella Italia Village, Lignano
Referee: Paolo Bucci (Italy)

=== Jamaica men vs the United States ===
22 June 2019
15:30 EDT (UTC−04)

Jamaica	26 – 24	United States
Tries: Grant (2), Walker, Thomas, Morris; Goals: Thompson (2), Bailey (1)	Report	Tries: Robinson, Jones, Wathen, Sylk; Goals: Foster (3), Jones (1)

University of the West Indies, Kingston

== July ==
=== Colombia men vs India in Australia ===
14 July 2019
15:00 AEST (UTC+10)

Colombia	16 – 30	India
Tries: Zuluaga (3); Goals: Vargas (2)	Report	Tries: Mahli (3), Chowdhury, Anuridh, Khan; Goals: Sharma (3)

W.J. Scott Park, Brisbane
Attendance: 550
Referee: Isaac Freeman

== August ==
=== Czech Republic men vs Serbia ===
24 August 2019
17:00 CEST (UTC+02)

Czech Republic	18 – 10	Serbia
Goals: Daniel Veselý (1/4)	Report (in Serbian)	Tries: Đorđe Stošić, Stefan Arsić; Goals: Vladimir Milutinović (1/2)

Vrchlabí Football Stadium, Vrchlabí
Attendance: ≈400
Referee: Jaroslav Bžoch (Czech Republic)

Notes:

- This fixture was initially announced as Czech Republic vs Netherlands.

== September ==
=== Canada women tour of Serbia ===
14 September 2019

Serbia	6 – 34	Canada
Tries: Jelena Stoiljković; Goals: Maja Baošić (1/1)	Report (in Serbian)	Tries: Sabrina Madaid (2), Mackenye Kane, Tasha Naismith, Ben Skinner, Krista Kent; Goals: Tasha Naismith (3/4), Sabrina Madaid (2/4)

SC Inge, Belgrade
Attendance: ≈250
Referee: Petar Milanović (Serbia)

21 September 2019
13:30 CEST (UTC+02)

Serbia	4 – 26	Canada
Tries: Maja Baošić; Goals: Maja Baošić (0/1)	Report (in Serbian)	Tries: Gabriela Hindli (2), Lea Milošević, Ben Skiner, Raša Naismit; Goals: Taša Naismit (2/5), Sabrine Madaid (1/1)

Makiš Stadium, Belgrade
Attendance: ≈100
Referee: Stefan Stamenić (Serbia)

=== Canada men tour of Serbia ===
14 September 2019

Bosnia and Herzegovina	2 – 78	Canada
Goals: Filip Stošić (1/1)	Report (in Serbian)	Tries: Tyler Doran (3), Brad Austin (2), Ash Calvert (2), Ethan Langs, Michael Mastdanni, Emil Borggren, Scycer Dumas, James Gwatkin, Toni Felix, Charles Curian; Goals: Ash Calvert (7/10), Brad Austin (4/4)

SC Inge, Belgrade
Attendance: ≈150
Referee: Stefan Stamenić (Serbia)

18 September 2019

Serbia B	6 – 54†	Canada
Tries: Vlado Kušić; Goals: Đorđe Stošić (1/1)	Report (in Serbian)	Tries: Ethan Langs (3), Scyler Dumas (2), Charles Curran, Emil Borggren, Brad Austin, Ash Calvert, Jordan Henry; Goals: Brad Austin (5/6), Ash Calvert (2/4)

Belgrade

21 September 2019
15:30 CEST (UTC+02)

Serbia	36 – 8	Canada
Tries: Predrag Keglić, Miloš Zogović, Vladimir Milutinović, Miloš Čalić, Stevan Stevanović, Aleksandar Đorđević, Rajko Trifunović; Goals: Džavid Jašari (3/4), Miloš Zogović (1/3)	Report (in Serbian)	Tries: Ethan Langs, Tony Felix; Goals: Brad Austin (0/2)

Makiš Stadium, Belgrade
Attendance: 250
Referee: Radoslav Novaković (Serbia)

=== Turkey women vs Greece ===
14 September 2019
15:00 TRT (UTC+03)

Turkey	40 – 4	Greece

Trakya University Ayşekadın Campus, Edirne

=== Turkey men vs Greece ===
14 September 2019
17:00 TRT (UTC+03)

Turkey	24 – 38	Greece
	Report

Trakya University Ayşekadın Campus, Edirne
Attendance: 150
Referee: Andrew Pilkington (Spain)

=== Griffin Cup ===
14 September 2019
16:00 CEST (UTC+02)

Germany	18 – 56	Netherlands

Gnarrenburg

=== Peru men vs Uruguay in Australia ===
15 September 2019
15:00 AEST (UTC+10)

Peru	34 – 30	Uruguay
Tries: Jye Sommers (3), Isaiah Parker, Sean Day, Josh Marrufo-Davidson, Jayden Ibarburu; Goals: Frank Altamirano (3)	Report	Tries: Diego Papa (2), Julio Toledo, Steve Clarke, Nico Papa; Goals: Diego Papa (5)

Waminda Oval, Sydney
Attendance: 350
Referee: Wayne Beh (Australia)

=== Poland women vs Czech Rugby ===
28 September 2019
14:00 CEST (UTC+02)

Poland	34 – 18	Czech Republic
Tries: Kowalski (2), Churmycz, Kolodziej, Kowalewski, Mykietyn, Michalowski; Goals: Michalowski (3/7)		Tries: Chrbolka, Hovard, Novotný; Goals: Veselý (2/2), Tichý (1/1)

KS Budowlani, Łódź
Referee: Misa Vakadranu (Netherlands)

Team details

FB	1	Robert Mykietyn
WG	2	Jacek Galewski
CE	27	Mark Churmycz
CE	23	Alex Kowalski
WG	5	Kamil Owoc
FE	19	Jonathan Tutak
HB	9	Nathan Michalowski
PR	8	Wojtek Sieczkowski (c)
HK	7	Mateusz Kowalewski
PR	10	Stephen Kolodziej
SR	11	Chippie Korostchuk
SR	13	Liam Siejka
LK	12	Seweryn Smolis
Interchange:
BE	6	Jakub Jastrzębowski
BE	14	Emil Petit
BE	15	Mateusz Kłosiński
BE	16	Mateusz Dziąg
Coach:
Lee Addison

FB	1	Oldřich Chrbolka
WG	2	Vojtěch Mach
CE	3	Matěj Rojt
CE	4	Tomáš Kasík
WG	5	Jakub Tichý
FE	6	Ladislav Cintler
HB	7	Daniel Veselý
PR	8	Tomáš Adamec
HK	9	Filip Sobotka
PR	10	Jaroslav Novotný
SR	11	Martin Hanč
SR	12	Pavel Mejstřík
LK	13	Ondřej Preininger (c)
Interchange:
BE	14	David Bělohlávek
BE	15	Jan Hovard
BE	16	Daniel Pechal
BE	17	Tomáš Brejtr
Coach:
Ladislav Cintler

Man of the Match:
Chippie Korostchuk (Poland)

== October ==
=== MEA Championship ===
2 October 2019
14:00 WAT (UTC+1)

Nigeria	25 – 12	Ghana
Tries: Fagborun (3), Adebiyi; Goals: I Lawal Saulawa (4/4); Field Goals: I Lawal Saulawa (1)	Report	Tries: Bless Mensah, Tettegah; Goals: Bless Mensah (2/2)

Teslim Balogun Stadium, Lagos
Referee: Phil Smith

2 October 2019
17:00 WAT (UTC+1)

Cameroon	4 – 8	Morocco
Tries: Emmanuel de Porta	Report	Goals: Iliass Laachiri (3/3); Field Goals: Iliass Laachiri (2)

Teslim Balogun Stadium, Lagos
Referee: Kevin de la Rose (France)

5 October 2019
14:00 WAT (UTC+1)

Ghana	10 – 4	Cameroon
Tries: Sarpong, Tettegah; Goals: Tettegah (1)	Report	Tries: Hermand

Teslim Balogun Stadium, Lagos
Referee: Phil Smith

5 October 2019

Nigeria	38 – 10	Morocco
Tries: Adebiyi (2), Agwoje(2), Prince, I Lawal-Saulawa, Izuchykwu, G. John; Goals: I Lawal-Saulawa (3), G. John (2)	Report	Tries: Eddiche, Laachiri; Goals: Laachiri (1)

Teslim Balogun Stadium, Lagos
Referee: Kevin de la Rose (France)

=== Turkey women vs France ===
5 October 2019
20:00 TRT (UTC+03)

Turkey	4 – 54	France

Esenler Stadium, Istanbul

=== Italy men vs Malta in Australia ===
12 October 2019
14:30 AEDT (UTC+11)

Italy	20 – 23	Malta
Tries: Iaria, Pelligra, Petralia; Goals: Pelligra (4/4)	Report	Tries: Benson, Campbell, Falzon, Sammut; Goals: Sammut (3/4); Drop goals: Sammut

Kirkham Park, Sydney
Attendance: 1,200
Referee: Lachlan Greenfield (Australia)

Team details

FB	1	Samuel Dolores
WG	2	Matt Tedesco
CE	3	Nick Okladnikov
CE	4	Ronny Palumbo
WG	5	Brock Pelligra
FE	6	Gus Garzaniti
HB	7	Josh Natoli
PR	8	John Trimboli
HK	9	Joey Tramontana (c)
PR	10	Rhys Sciglitano
SR	11	Alexander Myles
SR	12	Ryan King
LK	13	Ethan Natoli
Interchange:
BE	14	Luke Hodge
BE	15	Vince Ripepi
BE	16	Anton Iaria
BE	17	Daniel Petralia
Coach:
Leo Epifania

FB	1	Justin Rodrigues
WG	2	Nathan Benson
CE	3	Emanuel Sultana
CE	4	Cameron Mazzelli
WG	5	Jye Ellul
FE	6	Jono Dallas
HB	7	Jarrod Sammut
PR	8	Kyal Greene
HK	9	Adam Campbell
PR	10	Peter Cronin
SR	11	Kyle Cassel
SR	15	Jake Lennox
LK	13	Tyler Cassel (c)
Interchange:
BE	14	Joel Bradford
BE	16	Jake Scott
BE	17	Zach Borg
BE	18	Nathan Falzon
Coach:
Aaron McDonald

=== Poland men vs Sweden ===
12 October 2019
14:00 CEST (UTC+02)

Poland	16 – 50	Sweden

KS Budowlani, Łódź
Referee: Misa Vakadranu (Netherlands)

=== Philippines men vs Italy in Australia ===
19 October 2019
14:30 AEDT (UTC+11)

Philippines	16 – 44	Italy
Tries: Clarke, Cortez, Phillips; Goals: Goodwin (2/2), Stephenson (0/1)		Tries: Olocco (2), Zaurrini (2), J. Natoli, Okladnikov, Pelligra, Scarpelli, Sciglitano; Goals: Pelligra (5/9)

Windsor Sporting Complex, Sydney

Team details

FB	1	Richie Goodwin (c)
WG	2	Jhun Cortez
CE	3	Marco Dela Peña
CE	4	Ned Stephenson
WG	5	John Nicodemus
FE	16	Gerald Reyes
HB	7	Ryan Clarke
PR	8	Rez Phillips
HK	9	Luke Srama
PR	10	Ramon Stubbs
SR	11	Ricky Kucia
SR	12	Corey Kurnoth Jr
LK	19	Michael Greenhalgh
Interchange:
BE	6	Judd Greenhalgh
BE	14	Odyssey Laderas
BE	15	Klese Haas
BE	20	Trent Kurnoth
Coach:
Arwin Marcus

FB	1	Brock Pelligra
WG	2	Matt Tedesco (c)
CE	3	Nick Okladnikov
CE	4	Ronny Palumbo
WG	5	Michele Olocco
FE	6	Marc Zaurrini
HB	7	Josh Natoli
PR	8	Matt Bonanno
HK	9	Lachlan Scarpelli
PR	10	Luke Hodge
SR	11	Daniel De Vecchis
SR	12	Ryan King (c)
LK	13	Daniel Petralia
Interchange:
BE	14	Simone Boscolo
BE	15	Rhys Sciglitano
BE	16	Santino Battagliolo
BE	17	Ethan Natoli
Coach:
Leo Epifania

=== Poland men vs Norway ===
19 October 2019
13:00 CEST (UTC+02)

Poland	0 – 68	Norway

KS Budowlani, Łódź

=== England Knights men vs Jamaica ===
20 October 2019
15:00 BST (UTC+01)

England Knights	38 – 6†	Jamaica
Tries: Minikin (3), Lineham (2), Greenwood, King; Goals: Richardson (5/6)	Report	Tries: Caton-Brown; Goals: Woodburn-Hall (1/1)

Emerald Headingley Stadium, Leeds
Attendance: 7,113
Referee: Ben Thaler (England)

Team details

FB	1	Niall Evalds
WG	2	Tom Lineham
CE	3	Harry Newman
CE	4	Toby King (yellow card)
WG	5	Greg Minikin
FE	6	Harry Smith
HB	7	Danny Richardson
PR	8	Rob Butler
HK	9	Sam Powell (c)
PR	10	Oliver Partington
SR	11	Joe Greenwood
SR	12	Cameron Smith
LK	13	Morgan Smithies
Interchange:
BE	14	Kruise Leeming
BE	15	Mikolaj Oledzki
BE	16	Matty English
BE	17	Jack Ashworth
Coach:
Paul Anderson

FB	1	Ashton Golding
WG	2	Ben Jones-Bishop
CE	3	Mason Caton-Brown
CE	4	Joe Brown (c)
WG	5	Greg Johnson
FE	6	Jy-mel Coleman
HB	7	James Woodburn-Hall
PR	8	Jon Magrin
HK	9	Danny Thomas
PR	10	Khamisi McKain
SR	11	Keenan Tomlinson
SR	12	Joel Farrell
LK	13	Michael Lawrence
Interchange:
BE	14	Ross Peltier
BE	15	Jordan Andrade
BE	16	Mo Agoro
BE	17	Jenson Morris
Coach:
Romeo Monteith

Man of the Match:
Greg Minikin (England A)

=== France men tour of Australia ===
25 October 2019
15:10 AEDT (UTC+11)

Australia U-23s	62 – 4†	France
Tries: Graham (3), Lomax (2), Papenhuyzen (2), Radley (2), Fifita, Horsburgh, Kelly; Goals: Lomax (5/8), Garrick (2/4)		Tries: Jussaume; Goals: L. Albert (0/1)

WIN Stadium, Wollongong
Referee: Grant Atkins (Australia)

Team details

FB	1	Ryan Papenhuyzen
WG	2	Campbell Graham
CE	3	Brian Kelly
CE	4	Zac Lomax
WG	5	Reuben Garrick
FE	6	Kalyn Ponga
HB	7	Brodie Croft
PR	8	Corey Horsburgh
HK	9	Reed Mahoney
PR	10	Thomas Flegler
SR	11	David Fifita (c)
SR	12	Angus Crichton
LK	13	Victor Radley
Interchange:
BE	14	AJ Brimson
BE	15	Nat Butcher
BE	16	Emre Guler
BE	17	Tino Fa'asuamaleaui
Coach:
Neil Henry

FB	1	Thomas Lasvenes
WG	2	Gavin Marguerite
CE	3	Arthur Romano
CE	4	Vincent Albert
WG	5	Paul Marcon
FE	6	Hakim Miloudi
HB	7	Lucas Albert
PR	8	Maxime Puech
HK	9	Charles Bouzinac
PR	10	Lambert Belmas
SR	11	Paul Séguier
SR	12	Jordan Dezaria
LK	13	Romain Navarrete (c)
Interchange:
BE	14	Mathieu Jussaume
BE	15	Bastien Canet
BE	16	Arnaud Bartès
BE	17	Justin Sangaré
Coach:
Aurélien Cologni

Touch judges:
Todd Smith (Australia)
Stephane Vincent (France)

30 October 2019
19:00 AEDT (UTC+11)

Western Rams	20 – 22†	France
Tries: Ryan (2), Ronayne, Starling; Goals: Merritt (2/3), Porter (0/1)	Report	Tries: Miloudi (2), Marguerite, Romano; Goals: Miloudi (3/5)

Jock Colley Fields, Parkes
Attendance: 3,713
Referee: Simon Hartas (Australia)

Team details

FB	1	Will Lousick
WG	2	Lachlan Munro
CE	3	Jackson Brien
CE	4	Blake Lawson (yellow card)
WG	5	Aidan Ryan
FE	6	Josh Merritt (yellow card)
HB	7	Chad Porter
PR	8	Ethan McKellar
HK	9	Ryan Griffin
PR	20	Josh Starling (yellow card)
SR	11	Alex Ronayne (c)
SR	12	Ben Maguire
LK	13	Jake Betts
Interchange:
BE	10	Brandon Tago
BE	14	Nick Loader
BE	15	Sam Dwyer
BE	16	Ben Marlin
BE	17	Jed Betts
BE	18	Casey Burgess
BE	19	Jordan Pope
BE	21	Mitch Burke
Coach:
Tim Ryan

FB	20	Hakim Miloudi
WG	2	Gavin Marguerite
CE	24	Louis Jouffret
CE	4	Vincent Albert
WG	5	Paul Marcon
FE	3	Lucas Albert
HB	21	Joan Guasch
PR	8	Romain Navarrete (c) (yellow card)
HK	9	Matthieu Khedimi
PR	10	Maxime Puech
SR	11	Paul Séguier
SR	12	Arthur Romano
LK	13	Jordan Dezaria
Interchange:
BE	1	Thomas Lasvenes
BE	15	Arnaud Bartès
BE	16	Bastien Canet
BE	17	Justin Sangaré
BE	18	Arthur Mourgue
BE	19	Romain Puso
Coach:
Aurélien Cologni

Man of the Match:
Hakim Miloudi (France)

Notes:

- The Western Rams represent the Central West region of New South Wales, with players selected from the Group 10 and Group 11 competitions.

=== Canterbury men vs Samoa ===
25 October 2019

Canterbury Bulls	10 – 56†	Samoa

Ngā Puna Wai Sports Hub, Christchurch

=== Australia women vs New Zealand ===
25 October 2019
17:40 AEDT (UTC+11)

Australia	28 – 8	New Zealand
Tries: Harden, Brigginshaw, Sergis, Apps, Tungai; Goals: Tungai (4/6)	Report	Tries: Feterika, Hireme; Goals: Nicholls (0/2)

WIN Stadium, Wollongong
Referee: Belinda Sharpe (Australia)

=== Malta men vs Turkey in Australia ===
26 October 2019
14:00 AEDT (UTC+11)

Malta	28 – 12	Turkey
Tries: K. Cassel (2), Grech, Muscat, Scott; Goals: Sammut (4/5)	Report	Tries: Sahin, A. Salman-Cochrane; Goals: Bökeyhan Sürer (2/2)

New Era Stadium, Sydney
Attendance: 600
Referee: Mitchell Robinson (Australia)

Team details

FB	1	Jye Ellul
WG	2	Nathan Falzon
CE	3	Cameron Mazzelli
CE	4	Kyle Cassel
WG	5	Tyson Muscat
FE	6	Justin Rodrigues
HB	7	Jarrod Sammut
PR	8	Kyal Greene
HK	9	Adam Campbell
PR	10	Peter Cronin
SR	11	Jake Scott
SR	12	Aaron Grech
LK	13	Tyler Cassel (c)
Interchange:
BE	14	Joel Bradford
BE	15	Zach Borg
BE	16	Tyson Freeman
BE	17	Matt Borg
Coach:
Aaron McDonald

FB	13	Alper Karabork
WG	2	Atilla Sahine
CE	9	Presley Salman-Cochrane
CE	4	Arda Dalcik (c)
WG	8	Errol Carter
FE	6	Ali Bökeyhan Sürer
HB	12	Aydin Salman-Cochrane
PR	15	Enes Erten
HK	7	Bilal Yazici
PR	10	Adem Baskonyali
SR	11	Emre Kutup
SR	14	Doruk Çeliktutan
LK	3	Yusuf Aydin
Interchange:
BE	1	Huseyin Sasmaz
BE	5	Sergen-Ramazan Isik (yellow card)
BE	16	Kenan Tarpis
BE	20	Yusuf Dağdanaşar
Coach:
Scott Hartas

=== Great Britain Lions tour ===
26 October 2019
20:10 NZDT (UTC+13)

Tonga	14–6	Great Britain
Tries: Jennings, Katoa; Goals: Taukeiaho (3/3)	Report	Tries: Bateman; Goals: Widdop (1/1)

Waikato Stadium, Hamilton
Attendance: 9,420
Referee: Chris Kendall (England)

Team details

FB	1	William Hopoate
WG	2	David Fusitu'a
CE	3	Michael Jennings
CE	19	Konrad Hurrell
WG	5	Daniel Tupou
FE	6	Tuimoala Lolohea
HB	20	Tesi Niu
PR	15	Addin Fonua-Blake
HK	9	Siliva Havili
PR	10	Sio Siua Taukeiaho (c)
SR	11	Ben Murdoch-Masila
SR	12	Manu Ma'u
LK	13	Jason Taumalolo (c)
Interchange:
BE	8	Andrew Fifita
BE	14	Sione Katoa
BE	16	John Asiata
BE	17	Sitili Tupouniua
Coach:
Kristian Woolf

FB	1	Lachlan Coote
WG	2	Jermaine McGillvary
CE	3	Zak Hardaker
CE	4	Oliver Gildart
WG	5	Ryan Hall
SO	6	Gareth Widdop
SH	7	Jackson Hastings
PR	8	Chris Hill
HK	9	Josh Hodgson
PR	10	Luke Thompson
SR	11	John Bateman
SR	12	Elliott Whitehead
LF	13	James Graham (c)
Interchange:
BE	14	Josh Jones
BE	15	Tom Burgess
BE	16	Jonny Lomax
BE	17	Alex Walmsley
Coach:
Wayne Bennett

Touch judges:
Chris Butler (Australia)
Chris McMillan (New Zealand)
Video referee:
Jared Maxwell (Australia)

Notes:

- Tesi Niu (Tonga), Jackson Hastings, and Josh Jones (both Great Britain) made their Test debuts. Hastings and Jones were the only Great Britain players to have not previously represented their home nation.
- James Graham (Great Britain) made his 50th Test appearance – his 6th for Great Britain, with 44 for England. He became the 4th Briton and 8th person overall to do so.
- James Graham (Great Britain) is the only player to have previously played for the Lions, who were last active in 2007.

2 November 2019
17:00 NZDT (UTC+13)

New Zealand	12–8	Great Britain
Tries: Isaako, Harawira-Naera; Goals: Isaako (2/3)	Report	Tries: Clark; Goals: Widdop (2/3)

Eden Park, Auckland
Attendance: 25,575
Referee: Chris Kendall (England)

Team details

FB	1	Roger Tuivasa-Sheck
WG	2	Ken Maumalo
CE	3	Charnze Nicoll-Klokstad
CE	4	Joseph Manu
WG	5	Jamayne Isaako
FE	6	Kieran Foran
HB	7	Benji Marshall (c)
PR	8	Zane Tetevano
HK	21	Kodi Nikorima
PR	10	Jared Waerea-Hargreaves
SR	11	Briton Nikora
SR	12	Kenny Bromwich
LK	13	Joseph Tapine
Interchange:
BE	14	Jahrome Hughes
BE	15	Corey Harawira-Naera
BE	16	Leeson Ah Mau
BE	17	Adam Blair
Coach:
Michael Maguire

FB	1	Jonny Lomax
WG	2	Jermaine McGillvary
CE	3	Zak Hardaker
CE	4	Jake Connor
WG	5	Ryan Hall
SO	6	Gareth Widdop
SH	7	Jackson Hastings
PR	8	Chris Hill
HK	9	Josh Hodgson
PR	10	Tom Burgess
SR	11	John Bateman
SR	12	Elliott Whitehead
LF	13	James Graham (c)
Interchange:
BE	14	Josh Jones
BE	15	Joe Philbin
BE	16	Daryl Clark
BE	17	Alex Walmsley
Coach:
Wayne Bennett

Touch judges:
Chris Butler (Australia)
Chris McMillan (New Zealand)
Video referee:
Henry Perenara (New Zealand)

Notes:

- Adam Blair (New Zealand) made his 50th Test appearance for New Zealand becoming the 2nd New Zealander and 9th person overall to do so.

9 November 2019
20:00 NZDT (UTC+13)

New Zealand	23–8	Great Britain
Tries: Manu, Johnson, Maumalo; Goals: Isaako (5/7); Drop goals: Isaako		Tries: Hodgson; Goals: Widdop (2/2)

Rugby League Park, Christchurch
Attendance: 8,875
Referee: Gerard Sutton (Australia)

Team details

FB	1	Roger Tuivasa-Sheck
WG	2	Ken Maumalo
CE	3	Charnze Nicoll-Klokstad
CE	4	Joseph Manu
WG	5	Jamayne Isaako
FE	6	Shaun Johnson
HB	7	Benji Marshall (c)
PR	8	Zane Tetevano
HK	9	Brandon Smith
PR	10	Jared Waerea-Hargreaves
SR	11	Briton Nikora
SR	15	Kevin Proctor
LK	13	Joseph Tapine
Interchange:
BE	12	Corey Harawira-Naera
BE	14	Kodi Nikorima
BE	16	Leeson Ah Mau
BE	17	Adam Blair
Coach:
Michael Maguire

FB	1	Jonny Lomax
WG	2	Jermaine McGillvary
CE	3	Jack Hughes
CE	4	Jake Connor
WG	18	Blake Austin
SO	6	Gareth Widdop
SH	7	Jackson Hastings
PR	8	Chris Hill
HK	9	Josh Hodgson
PR	10	Tom Burgess
SR	11	John Bateman
SR	12	Elliott Whitehead
LF	13	James Graham (c)
Interchange:
BE	14	Josh Jones
BE	16	Daryl Clark
BE	17	Alex Walmsley
BE	20	Luke Thompson
Coach:
Wayne Bennett

Touch judges:
Chris McMillan (New Zealand)
Dave Munro (Australia)
Video referee:
Henry Perenara (New Zealand)

Notes:

- Blake Austin and Jack Hughes (both Great Britain) made their Test debuts, having not previously represented their home nation.

16 November 2019
17:30 (UTC+10)

Papua New Guinea	28–10	Great Britain
Tries: Boas, Ipape, Johnston, Olam, Putt; Goals: Martin (3/4), Laybutt (1/1)	Report	Tries: Austin, Hodgson; Goals: Widdop (1/2)

PNG Football Stadium, Port Moresby
Referee: Grant Atkins (Australia)

Team details

FB	1	Alex Johnston
WG	2	Edene Gebbie
CE	3	David Mead
CE	4	Justin Olam
WG	5	Stargroth Amean
FE	6	Kyle Laybutt
HB	7	Watson Boas
PR	8	Wellington Albert
HK	9	Wartovo Puara Jr
PR	10	Luke Page
SR	11	Nixon Putt
SR	12	Daniel Russell
LK	13	Rhyse Martin (c)
Interchange:
BE	14	Edwin Ipape
BE	15	Garry Lo
BE	16	Stanton Albert
BE	17	Moses Meninga
Coach:
Michael Marum

FB	1	Jonny Lomax
WG	2	Jermaine McGillvary
CE	3	Jack Hughes
CE	4	Jake Connor
WG	5	Blake Austin
SO	6	Gareth Widdop
SH	7	Jackson Hastings
PR	8	Chris Hill
HK	9	Josh Hodgson
PR	10	Tom Burgess
SR	11	John Bateman
SR	12	Elliott Whitehead
LF	13	James Graham (c)
Interchange:
BE	15	Luke Thompson
BE	17	Alex Walmsley
BE	18	Joe Philbin
BE	19	George Williams
Coach:
Wayne Bennett

Touch judges:
Hanua Rupa (Papua New Guinea)
Mexi Topani (Papua New Guinea)
Video referee:
Shayne Hayne (Australia)

=== World Cup qualifiers - European play-off tournament ===
==== Group A ====
Pos	Team	Pld	W	D	L	PF	PA	PD	Pts	Qualification
1	Ireland	2	2	0	0	67	12	+55	4	Qualification for 2021 Rugby League World Cup
2	Italy	2	1	0	1	38	29	+9	2	Qualification for 2021 Rugby League World Cup
3	Spain	2	0	0	2	12	76	−64	0	

Source: ERL

26 October 2019
17:00 CEST (UTC+02:00)

Spain	8–42	Ireland
Tries: R. Franco; Goals: Pallares (2/2)	Report	Tries: McCarthy (2), Bentley, Keyes, McNally, Podesta, Roberts; Goals: Podesta (7/7)

Ciutat de l'Esport, Xàtiva
Attendance: 1,013
Referee: Geoffrey Poumes (France)
Touch judges: Ludovic Bernard (France), Alexandre Guedes (France)

Team details

FB	1	Romain Franco
WG	2	Alexis Escamilla
CE	3	Antonio Puerta (yellow card)
CE	4	Alex Doutres (c)
WG	5	Daniel Garcia
FE	6	Luc Franco
HB	7	Romain Pallares
PR	8	Gaetan Estruga
HK	9	Miguel Blanco-Charters
PR	10	Maxime Garcia
SR	11	Emir Walid Bouregba
SR	12	Anthony Delgado
LK	13	Julien Agullo
Interchange:
BE	14	Kevin Aparicio
BE	15	Ludovic Renu
BE	16	Rafael Garcia
BE	17	Simon Juarez
Coach:
Darren Fisher

FB	1	Ethan Ryan
WG	2	Matt Coade
CE	3	Frankie Halton
CE	4	James Bentley
WG	5	Roland Podesta
SO	6	Gregg McNally
SH	7	Joe Keyes (yellow card)
PR	8	Liam Byrne
HK	9	Bob Beswick (c)
PR	10	Pat Moran
SR	11	Oliver Roberts
SR	12	Tyrone McCarthy
LF	13	George King
Interchange:
BE	15	Ronan Michael
BE	16	Danny Bridge
BE	17	Michael Ward
BE	19	Declan O'Donnell
Coach:
Stuart Littler

Notes:

- This match was originally fixtured to be played at Estadio Matías Prats in Torredonjimeno.

2 November 2019
16:00 CET (UTC+01:00)

Italy	34–4	Spain
Tries: Passera (2), Campagnolo, King, Santi, Tramontana; Goals: Campagnolo (5/7)	Report	Tries: L. Franco; Goals: Pallares (0/1)

Stadio G. Teghil, Lignano Sabbiadoro
Referee: Benjamin Casty (France)
Touch judges: Jaroslav Bžoch (Czech Republic), Geoffrey Poumes (France)

Team details

FB	1	Samuel Dolores
WG	2	Emanuele Passera (yellow card)
CE	3	Ethan Natoli (red card)
CE	4	Ronny Palumbo
WG	5	Richard Lepori
FE	6	Gus Garzaniti
HB	7	Jack Campagnolo
PR	8	Alec Susino
HK	9	Joey Tramontana
PR	10	Brenden Santi (c)
SR	11	Ryan King
SR	12	Alexander Myles
LK	13	Gioele Celerino
Interchange:
BE	14	Daniel Petralia
BE	15	Anton Iaria
BE	16	Rhys Sciglitano
BE	17	John Trimboli
Coach:
Leo Epifania

FB	1	Romain Franco
WG	2	Alexis Escamilla
CE	3	Daniel Garcia
CE	4	Alex Doutres (c)
WG	5	Ludovic Renu
FE	6	Luc Franco
HB	7	Romain Pallares
PR	8	Gaetan Estruga
HK	9	Miguel Blanco-Charters
PR	10	Kevin Aparicio
SR	11	Antonio Puerta
SR	12	Rafael Garcia
LK	13	Julien Agullo (yellow card)
Interchange:
BE	14	Miquel Tomàs
BE	15	Maxime Garcia
BE	16	Emir Walid Bouregba
BE	17	Anthony Delgado
Coach:
Darren Fisher

9 November 2019
19:00 IST (UTC+01:00)

Ireland	25–4	Italy
Tries: Moran (2), McNally, King; Goals: Podesta (4/4); Drop goals: Keyes	Report	Tries: Tramontana; Goals: Campagnolo (0/1)

Morton Stadium, Santry
Referee: Liam Moore (England)
Touch judges: Gareth Jones (England), Andy Smith (England)

Team details

FB	1	Ethan Ryan
WG	2	Matt Coade
CE	3	Zack McComb
CE	4	James Bentley
WG	5	Roland Podesta
SO	6	Gregg McNally
SH	7	Joe Keyes
PR	8	Liam Byrne
HK	9	Bob Beswick (c)
PR	10	Pat Moran
SR	11	Frankie Halton
SR	12	Tyrone McCarthy
LF	13	George King
Interchange:
BE	15	Ronan Michael
BE	16	Danny Bridge
BE	17	Michael Ward
BE	19	James Mulvaney
Coach:
Stuart Littler

FB	1	Samuel Dolores
WG	2	Emanuele Passera
CE	3	Ethan Natoli
CE	4	Ronny Palumbo
WG	5	Richard Lepori
FE	6	Gus Garzaniti
HB	7	Jack Campagnolo
PR	8	Alec Susino
HK	9	Joey Tramontana
PR	10	Brenden Santi (c) (yellow card)
SR	11	Ryan King
SR	12	Alexander Myles
LK	13	Gioele Celerino
Interchange:
BE	14	Daniel Petralia
BE	15	Anton Iaria
BE	16	Rhys Sciglitano
BE	17	John Trimboli
Coach:
Leo Epifania

==== Group B ====
Pos	Team	Pld	W	D	L	PF	PA	PD	Pts	Qualification
1	Scotland	2	2	0	0	128	24	+104	4	Qualification for 2021 Rugby League World Cup
2	Greece	2	1	0	1	106	48	+58	2	Qualification for 2021 Rugby League World Cup
3	Serbia	2	0	0	2	6	168	−162	0	

Source: ERL

26 October 2019
15:00 BST (UTC+01:00)

Scotland	86–0	Serbia
Tries: Oakes (3), Scott (3), Brierley (2), Alex Walker (2), Glohe, Hellewell, Kavanagh, McLelland, Turland; Goals: Brierley (13/15)	Report

Lochinch Sports Pavilion, Glasgow
Attendance: 300
Referee: Tom Grant (England)
Touch judges: Dean Bowmer (England), Jack Smith (England)

Team details

FB	1	Alex Walker
WG	2	Davey Dixon
CE	3	David Scott
CE	4	Ben Hellewell
WG	5	Will Oakes
SO	6	Callum McLelland
SH	7	Ryan Brierley
PR	8	Luke Douglas
HK	9	Danny Addy (yellow card)
PR	10	Adam Walker
SR	11	Nick Glohe
SR	12	Ben Kavanagh
LF	13	Dale Ferguson (c)
Interchange:
BE	15	Sam Luckley
BE	17	Kieran Moran
BE	20	Matt Hogg
BE	23	Dan Turland
Coach:
Nathan Graham

FB	1	Vojislav Dedić
WG	2	Zane Bijorac
CE	3	Aleksandar Djordjević
CE	4	James Mirčeski (yellow card)
WG	5	Dragan Janković
FE	6	Daniel Marjanović
HB	7	Ben Stevanović
PR	8	Vladica Nikolić
HK	9	Rajko Janković (yellow card)
PR	10	Miloš Ćalić
SR	11	Jason Muranka
SR	12	Stefan Nedeljković
LK	13	Stevan Stevanović (c)
Interchange:
BE	14	Lazar Živković
BE	15	Vladimir Milutinović
BE	16	Ilija Radan (yellow card)
BE	17	Daniel Burke
Coach:
Stuart Wilkinson

1 November 2019
20:20 GMT (UTC+00:00)

Greece	24–42	Scotland
Tries: Kambos, Mamouzelos, Tuliatu, Zampetides; Goals: Meads (4/4)	Report	Tries: Kavanagh (2), McLelland (2), Brierley, Douglas, Oakes, Scott; Goals: Brierley (2/6), Thomas (2/2), Douglas (1/1)

New River Stadium, London
Attendance: 350
Referee: James Child (England)
Touch judges: Peter Brooke (England), Matt Rossleigh (England)

Team details

FB	1	Terry Constantinou
WG	2	John Mitsias
CE	3	Grigoris Koutsimpogiorgos
CE	4	Mitchell Zampetides
WG	5	Nick Mougios
FE	6	Chaise Robinson
HB	7	Jordan Meads (c)
PR	8	Stefano Totidis
HK	9	Peter Mamouzelos
PR	10	Robert Tuliatu
SR	11	Sebastian Sell
SR	12	Jake Kambos
LK	13	Billy Magoulias
Interchange:
BE	14	Konstantinos Katsidonis
BE	15	Stefanos Bastas
BE	16	Jake Vrahnos
BE	17	Theodoros Nianiakas
Coach:
Steve Georgallis

FB	1	Alex Walker
WG	20	Matt Hogg
CE	3	David Scott
CE	2	Davey Dixon
WG	5	Will Oakes
SO	6	Callum McLelland
SH	7	Ryan Brierley
PR	8	Luke Douglas
HK	9	Danny Addy
PR	15	Sam Luckley
SR	11	Nick Glohe
SR	12	Ben Kavanagh
LF	13	Dale Ferguson (c)
Interchange:
BE	10	Dan Turland
BE	16	Joe McClean
BE	17	Kieran Moran (yellow card)
BE	21	Liam Faughlin
Coach:
Nathan Graham

9 November 2019
13:00 CET (UTC+01:00)

Serbia	6–82	Greece
Tries: Mirčeski; Goals: Zogović (1/1)	Report	Tries: Robinson (3), Bosmos (2), Meads (2), Mitsias (2), Constantinou, Dardamanis, Kambos, Magoulias, Mamouzelos, Mougios, G. Tsikrikas; Goals: Meads (9)

Makiš Stadium, Belgrade
Attendance: 180
Referee: Robert Hicks (England)
Touch judges: Denys Cherniev (Ukraine), Andrew Pilkington (Spain)

Team details

FB	1	Miloš Zogović
WG	2	Dragan Janković
CE	3	Zane Bijorac
CE	4	Aleksandar Djordjević
WG	5	Rajko Trifunović
FE	6	Vojislav Dedić
HB	7	Daniel Burke
PR	8	Vladica Nikolić
HK	9	Vlada Dedić
PR	16	Miloš Ćalić
SR	11	Jason Muranka
SR	12	James Mirčeski
LK	13	Stevan Stevanović (c)
Interchange:
BE	10	Vladimir Milutinović
BE	14	Ilija Radan
BE	15	Nikola Srbljanin
BE	17	Lazar Živković
Coach:
Stuart Wilkinson

FB	6	Chaise Robinson
WG	2	Nikolaos Bosmos
CE	5	Nick Mougios
CE	4	Terry Constantinou
WG	3	John Mitsias
FE	13	Billy Magoulias
HB	7	Jordan Meads (c)
PR	8	Stefanos Bastas
HK	9	Peter Mamouzelos
PR	16	Billy Tsikrikas
SR	11	Jake Kambos
SR	12	Sebastian Sell
LK	10	George Tsikrikas
Interchange:
BE	1	Adam Vrahnos
BE	15	Stefano Totidis
BE	17	Robert Tuliatu
BE	18	Aris Dardamanis
Coach:
Steve Georgallis

== November ==
=== India men vs Latin America ===
26 October 2019
15:00 AEDT (UTC+11)

India	30 – 26†	Latin America

H E Laybutt Sporting Complex, Sydney

Notes:

- This fixture was initially announced as India vs El Salvador, but due to a number of injuries to their squad, El Salvador was required to draft players from Latin Heat Rugby League to fulfil the fixture.

=== Philippines men vs Japan ===
Asian Cup

9 November 2019

Philippines	4 – 74	Japan
	Report

Aurora Rugby Football Club, Manila
Attendance: 1,000
Referee: Marc Leabres

=== England women tour of Papua New Guinea ===
9 November 2019
14:00 (UTC+10)

Papua New Guinea	10 – 24	England
Tries: Joe, Ravu; Goals: Kaiat (1/2)	Report	Tries: Rudge (4), Anderson, Thompson; Goals: Stanley (0/4), Gaskin (0/2)

National Sports Institute, Goroka
Attendance: ≈7,000
Referee: Paul Wani (Papua New Guinea)

16 November 2019
15:00 (UTC+10)

Papua New Guinea	20 – 16	England
Tries: Humeu, Gwasamum, Kapo, Joe; Goals: Kaiat (2/4)	Report	Tries: Stanley, Rudge, Williams; Goals: Stanley (2/4)

PNG Football Stadium, Port Moresby
Referee: Chris Butler (Australia)

=== Wales A men vs Lithuania ===
10 November 2019
14:30 GMT (UTC+00)

Wales A	58 – 0†	Lithuania

Cardiff Arms Park, Cardiff

=== England A women vs Wales ===
16 November 2019

England A	20 – 24†	Wales
Tries: Davis, Harvey, Templeton, Tamou; Goals: Johnson (1/1), Davis (1/3)	Report	Tries: Taylor (2), Davies (2), Lewis; Goals: Salter (2/5)

Ruskin Drive, St Helens
Attendance: 425
Referee: Sam Houghton (England)

=== Wales A men vs Malta ===
23 November 2019
14:30 GMT (UTC+00)

Wales A	34 – 18†	Malta

Brewery Field, Bridgend

== See also ==
- Rugby league nines at the 2019 Pacific Games
- 2019 Rugby League World Cup 9s
