= 2019 Rugby League World Cup 9s squads =

The 2019 Rugby League World Cup 9s was an international rugby league tournament played in the rugby league nines format, to be held in Australia on 18 and 19 October 2019. Twelve national teams competed, with four of those also fielding women's teams. The squads consisted of 16 players.

Players' positions are listed as either backs (BK) or forwards (FW). Their age is given as of the tournament's opening day, 18 October 2019.

== Pool A ==
=== Australia ===
Coach: Mal Meninga

Australia named their 16-man squad on 7 October 2019. Cody Walker and Curtis Scott were originally named, but withdrew. They were replaced by Daly Cherry-Evans and Campbell Graham respectively.

No.	Pos.	Player	Date of birth (age)	Club
2	BK	Josh Addo-Carr	28 July 1995 (aged 24)	Melbourne Storm
14	FW	Jai Arrow	12 July 1995 (aged 24)	Gold Coast Titans
12	BK	AJ Brimson	9 September 1998 (aged 21)	Gold Coast Titans
15	FW	Nathan Brown	1 March 1993 (aged 26)	Parramatta Eels
3	BK	Daly Cherry-Evans	20 February 1989 (aged 30)	Manly Warringah Sea Eagles
8	BK	Kyle Feldt	9 February 1992 (aged 27)	North Queensland Cowboys
11	FW	David Fifita	25 February 2000 (aged 19)	Brisbane Broncos
6	FW	Tyson Frizell	9 October 1991 (aged 28)	St. George Illawarra Dragons
16	BK	Reuben Garrick	30 June 1997 (aged 22)	Manly Warringah Sea Eagles
10	BK	Campbell Graham	2 June 1999 (aged 20)	South Sydney Rabbitohs
4	FW	Wade Graham (captain)	25 October 1990 (aged 28)	Cronulla-Sutherland Sharks
9	BK	Clinton Gutherson	9 September 1994 (aged 25)	Parramatta Eels
5	BK	Ben Hunt	27 March 1990 (aged 29)	St. George Illawarra Dragons
7	BK	Mitchell Moses	17 September 1994 (aged 25)	Parramatta Eels
13	BK	Ryan Papenhuyzen	10 June 1998 (aged 21)	Melbourne Storm
1	BK	Kalyn Ponga	30 March 1998 (aged 21)	Newcastle Knights

=== New Zealand ===
Coach: Michael Maguire

New Zealand named their 16-man squad on 9 October 2019. James Fisher-Harris and Jordan Rapana were originally named, but withdrew and were replaced by Zane Tetevano and Charnze Nicoll-Klokstad respectively. Braden Hamlin-Uele was ruled out after the final squads had been finalised. Adam Blair was brought in as a late replacement.

No.	Pos.	Player	Date of birth (age)	Club
8	FW	Leeson Ah Mau	20 December 1989 (aged 29)	New Zealand Warriors
	FW	Adam Blair	23 March 1986 (aged 33)	New Zealand Warriors
7	BK	Dylan Brown	21 June 2000 (aged 19)	Parramatta Eels
5	FW	Corey Harawira-Naera	18 May 1995 (aged 24)	Canterbury-Bankstown Bulldogs
1	BK	Jamayne Isaako	5 June 1996 (aged 23)	Brisbane Broncos
6	BK	Shaun Johnson (captain)	9 September 1990 (aged 29)	Cronulla-Sutherland Sharks
12	FW	Jeremy Marshall-King	2 December 1995 (aged 23)	Canterbury-Bankstown Bulldogs
2	BK	Ken Maumalo	16 July 1994 (aged 25)	New Zealand Warriors
3	BK	Charnze Nicoll-Klokstad	2 August 1995 (aged 24)	Canberra Raiders
4	FW	Briton Nikora	7 December 1997 (aged 21)	Cronulla-Sutherland Sharks
9	BK	Kodi Nikorima	3 April 1994 (aged 25)	New Zealand Warriors
13	FW	Kevin Proctor	28 February 1989 (aged 30)	Gold Coast Titans
16	BK	Bailey Simonsson	18 February 1998 (aged 21)	Canberra Raiders
15	BK	Reimis Smith	13 May 1997 (aged 22)	Canterbury-Bankstown Bulldogs
10	FW	Joseph Tapine	4 May 1994 (aged 25)	Canberra Raiders
14	FW	Zane Tetevano	4 November 1990 (aged 28)	Sydney Roosters

=== Papua New Guinea ===
Coach: Michael Marum

PNG named their 16-man squad on 1 October 2019. James Segeyaro and Lachlan Lam were originally named, but were replaced by Moses Meninga and Wartovo Puara.

No.	Pos.	Player	Date of birth (age)	Club
10	BK	Stargroth Amean	9 March 1991 (aged 28)	Barrow Raiders
7	BK	Watson Boas	8 November 1994 (aged 24)	Doncaster
1	BK	Edene Gebbie	6 May 1995 (aged 24)	Wynnum Manly Seagulls
14	BK	Edwin Ipape	2 February 1999 (aged 20)	Wynnum Manly Seagulls
6	BK	Kyle Laybutt	26 September 1995 (aged 24)	Townsville Blackhawks
2	BK	Bernard Lewis	23 October 1997 (aged 21)	Sydney Roosters
13	BK	Garry Lo	1 November 1993 (aged 25)	PNG Hunters
12	FW	Rhyse Martin (captain)	1 March 1993 (aged 26)	Leeds Rhinos
16	FW	Moses Meninga	6 June 1993 (aged 26)	PNG Hunters
4	BK	Justin Olam	23 December 1993 (aged 25)	Melbourne Storm
9	FW	Wartovo Puara	24 June 1990 (aged 29)	Barrow Raiders
8	FW	Nixon Putt	3 March 1995 (aged 24)	Norths Devils
3	BK	Daniel Russell	5 December 1995 (aged 23)	North Queensland Cowboys
11	BK	Jedidiah Simbiken	28 September 1998 (aged 21)	Redcliffe Dolphins
15	BK	Stanford Talita	29 December 1995 (aged 23)	Hela Wigmen
5	BK	Terry Wapi	30 August 1996 (aged 23)	PNG Hunters

=== United States ===
Coach: Sean Rutgerson

The United States named a 20-man training squad on 3 September 2019. The final 16-man squad was announced on 10 October 2019.

No.	Pos.	Player	Date of birth (age)	Club
2	BK	Ryan Burroughs	26 August 1991 (aged 28)	Northern Virginia Eagles
15	FW	Brock Davies	14 June 1990 (aged 29)	Brooklyn Kings RLFC
9	FW	Connor Donehue	9 May 1996 (aged 23)	Brooklyn Kings RLFC
11	FW	Joe Eichner	9 October 1991 (aged 28)	Northern Pride
20	BK	Bureta Faraimo	16 July 1990 (aged 29)	Hull F.C.
14	BK	Jay Florimo	28 April 1990 (aged 29)	The Entrance Tigers
7	BK	Kristian Freed	4 July 1987 (aged 32)	Wests Mitchelton Panthers
17	FW	Khalial Harris	14 January 1995 (aged 24)	Jacksonville Axemen
13	FW	Daniel Howard	13 December 1984 (aged 34)	Wentworthville Magpies
6	BK	Charlie Jones	20 April 1991 (aged 28)	Jacksonville Axemen
1	BK	Corey Makelim	6 January 1994 (aged 25)	Sheffield Eagles
4	BK	Ronaldo Mulitalo	17 November 1999 (aged 19)	Cronulla-Sutherland Sharks
10	FW	Mark Offerdahl (captain)	15 October 1987 (aged 32)	Goondiwindi Boars
8	FW	Eddy Pettybourne	13 February 1988 (aged 31)	Central Queensland Capras
3	BK	Junior Vaivai	18 January 1990 (aged 29)	Toulouse Olympique
12	FW	Jerome Veve	2 April 1997 (aged 22)	Souths Logan Magpies
5	BK	David Washington	23 September 1990 (aged 29)	Jacksonville Axemen

== Pool B ==
=== England ===
Coach: Wayne Bennett

England named their 16-man squad on 6 October 2019. Jack Hughes was originally named, but withdrew due to injury. He was replaced by Blake Austin.

No.	Pos.	Player	Date of birth (age)	Club
7	BK	Blake Austin	1 February 1991 (aged 28)	Warrington Wolves
1	FW	Tom Burgess	21 April 1992 (aged 27)	South Sydney Rabbitohs
2	FW	Daryl Clark	10 February 1993 (aged 26)	Warrington Wolves
3	BK	Jake Connor	18 October 1994 (aged 25)	Hull F.C.
4	FW	James Graham (captain)	10 September 1985 (aged 34)	St. George Illawarra Dragons
5	BK	Ryan Hall	27 November 1987 (aged 31)	Sydney Roosters
6	BK	Ash Handley	16 February 1996 (aged 23)	Leeds Rhinos
8	BK	Reece Lyne	2 December 1992 (aged 26)	Wakefield Trinity
9	BK	Jermaine McGillvary	16 May 1988 (aged 31)	Huddersfield Giants
10	FW	Ryan Sutton	2 August 1995 (aged 24)	Canberra Raiders
11	BK	Sam Tomkins	23 March 1989 (aged 30)	Catalans Dragons
12	BK	Jacob Trueman	16 February 1999 (aged 20)	Castleford Tigers
13	FW	Liam Watts	8 July 1990 (aged 29)	Castleford Tigers
14	FW	Elliott Whitehead	4 September 1989 (aged 30)	Canberra Raiders
15	BK	Gareth Widdop	12 March 1989 (aged 30)	St. George Illawarra Dragons
16	BK	George Williams	31 October 1994 (aged 24)	Wigan Warriors

=== France ===
Coach: Aurélien Cologni

France named a 17-man squad on 2 October 2019. Lilian Albert was originally named but withdrew.

No.	Pos.	Player	Date of birth (age)	Club
6	BK	Lucas Albert	4 July 1998 (aged 21)	Catalans Dragons
13	FW	Jason Baitieri (captain)	2 July 1989 (aged 30)	Catalans Dragons
4	FW	Lambert Belmas	11 August 1997 (aged 22)	Catalans Dragons
11	FW	Charlie Bouzinac	10 January 1994 (aged 25)	Lézignan Sangliers
8	FW	Bastien Canet	26 June 1993 (aged 26)	AS Carcassonne
9	FW	Alrix Da Costa	2 October 1997 (aged 22)	Catalans Dragons
16	FW	Jordan Dezaria	6 November 1996 (aged 22)	Toulouse Olympique
7	BK	Louis Jouffret	24 August 1995 (aged 24)	Featherstone Rovers
15	BK	Mathieu Jussaume	17 May 1999 (aged 20)	Toulouse Olympique
1	BK	Thomas Lasvenes	6 May 1996 (aged 23)	Villeneuve XIII RLLG
5	BK	Paul Marcon	10 July 1995 (aged 24)	Toulouse Olympique
2	BK	Gavin Marguerite	12 August 1996 (aged 23)	Toulouse Olympique
3	BK	Hakim Miloudi	26 June 1993 (aged 26)	Toronto Wolfpack
14	BK	Arthur Mourgue	7 May 1999 (aged 20)	Saint-Estève XIII Catalan
12	FW	Arthur Romano	17 August 1997 (aged 22)	Catalans Dragons
10	FW	Justin Sangaré	7 March 1998 (aged 21)	Toulouse Olympique

=== Lebanon ===
Coach: Rick Stone

Lebanon named their 16-man squad on 10 October 2019. Anthony Layoun was originally named but was replaced by Jordan Samrani. Jacob Kiraz and Jordan Samrani were ruled ineligible to participate due to being under the age of 18. Kiraz took the field against France, however.

No.	Pos.	Player	Date of birth (age)	Club
13	FW	Jalal Bazzaz		St George Illawarra Dragons
2	BK	Jayden El-Jalkh	26 September 1997 (aged 22)	Western Suburbs Magpies
10	FW	Elie El-Zakhem	17 April 1998 (aged 21)	Canterbury-Bankstown Bulldogs
14	BK	Johnny-Lee Gabrael	22 August 2001 (aged 18)	Balmain Tigers
5	BK	Ahmad Harajly	20 January 1994 (aged 25)	New England Free Jacks
15	FW	Kayne Kalache	10 June 1998 (aged 21)	Canterbury-Bankstown Bulldogs
7	BK	Jacob Kiraz	23 November 2001 (aged 17)	North Queensland Cowboys
8	BK	Bilal Maarbani	12 February 1998 (aged 21)	Wests Tigers
4	BK	John-Paul Nohra		Parramatta Eels
6	BK	Adam Rizk	27 January 1999 (aged 20)	North Sydney Bears
12	BK	Josh Rizk	22 March 2001 (aged 18)	Balmain Tigers
1	BK	Reece Robinson	13 June 1987 (aged 32)	Queanbeyan Kangaroos
3	BK	Travis Robinson	13 June 1987 (aged 32)	Newtown Jets
16	FW	James Roumanos	10 August 1999 (aged 20)	Canterbury-Bankstown Bulldogs
9	BK	Jordan Samrani		Cronulla-Sutherland Sharks
11	FW	Charbel Tasipale	24 February 2000 (aged 19)	Parramatta Eels

=== Wales ===
Coach: John Kear

Wales named a 23-man training squad on 16 September. The final 16-man squad was announced on 9 October 2019.

No.	Pos.	Player	Date of birth (age)	Club
15	FW	Gavin Bennion	31 December 1993 (aged 25)	Swinton Lions
4	BK	Mike Butt	6 May 1995 (aged 24)	Swinton Lions
16	FW	Connor Davies	17 January 1997 (aged 22)	Halifax
10	FW	Curtis Davies	17 January 1997 (aged 22)	Halifax
12	FW	Ben Evans	30 October 1992 (aged 26)	Toulouse Olympique
3	BK	Rhys Evans	30 October 1992 (aged 26)	Bradford Bulls
8	BK	Will Evans	4 May 2001 (aged 18)	Burleigh Bears
13	FW	Daniel Fleming	8 July 1992 (aged 27)	Halifax
5	BK	Regan Grace	12 December 1996 (aged 22)	St Helens
6	BK	Dalton Grant	21 April 1990 (aged 29)	Bradford Bulls
11	BK	Cobi Green	4 March 1999 (aged 20)	Bradford Bulls
1	BK	Elliot Kear (captain)	29 November 1988 (aged 30)	London Broncos
14	FW	Rhodri Lloyd	22 July 1993 (aged 26)	Swinton Lions
7	BK	James Olds	6 April 1991 (aged 28)	Wests Panthers
9	FW	Lloyd White	9 August 1988 (aged 31)	Mackay Cutters
2	BK	Rhys Williams	8 December 1989 (aged 29)	London Broncos

== Pool C ==
=== Cook Islands ===
Coach: Tony Iro

No.	Pos.	Player	Date of birth (age)	Club
1	BK	Tevin Arona	5 September 1995 (aged 24)	Canterbury Bulls
12	BK	Anthony Gelling	18 October 1990 (aged 29)	Widnes Vikings
4	FW	Alex Glenn (captain)	31 July 1988 (aged 31)	Brisbane Broncos
3	BK	Kayal Iro	20 February 2000 (aged 19)	New Zealand Warriors
5	BK	Steven Marsters	19 October 1999 (aged 19)	St. George Illawarra Dragons
11	FW	Sam Mataora	20 October 1990 (aged 28)	Belconnen United Sharks
10	FW	Tepai Moeroa	2 October 1995 (aged 24)	Parramatta Eels
16	FW	Moses Noovao-McGreal	7 February 1996 (aged 23)	Norths Devils
8	FW	Junior Pua		New Zealand Warriors
15	FW	John Puna	24 May 1992 (aged 27)	Easts Tigers
2	BK	Reubenn Rennie	22 October 1995 (aged 23)	Mount Pritchard Mounties
14	FW	Vincent Rennie	17 June 1994 (aged 25)	Mount Pritchard Mounties
6	BK	Brad Takairangi	14 June 1989 (aged 30)	Parramatta Eels
13	FW	Brody Tamarua	9 March 1999 (aged 20)	New Zealand Warriors
9	FW	Aaron Teroi	2 October 1995 (aged 24)	Central Queensland Capras
7	BK	Paul Ulberg	14 November 1995 (aged 23)	Norths Devils

=== Fiji ===
Coach: Brandon Costin

Fiji named their 16-man squad on 10 October 2019. Mikaele Ravalawa was originally named but was replaced by Semi Valemei.

No.	Pos.	Player	Date of birth (age)	Club
6	BK	Waqa Blake	26 October 1994 (aged 24)	Parramatta Eels
12	FW	Viliame Kikau	5 April 1995 (aged 24)	Penrith Panthers
9	FW	Apisai Koroisau	7 November 1992 (aged 26)	Manly Warringah Sea Eagles
1	FW	Joseva Lawalawa		Ravoravo Rabbitohs
16	BK	Penaia Leveleve	1 February 1996 (aged 23)	Nabua Broncos
8	BK	Isaac Lumelume	16 April 1998 (aged 21)	Melbourne Storm
13	BK	Taane Milne	19 May 1995 (aged 24)	New Zealand Warriors
17	BK	Luke Nadurutalo		Nadera Panthers
2	BK	Kevin Naiqama (captain)	4 February 1989 (aged 30)	St Helens
15	BK	Selestino Ravutaumada	17 January 2000 (aged 19)	New Zealand Warriors
3	BK	Maika Sivo	3 October 1993 (aged 26)	Parramatta Eels
14	BK	Penioni Tagituimua	20 January 1999 (aged 20)	Nadera Panthers
10	BK	Maika Tudravu	27 May 1991 (aged 28)	Army Bears
4	BK	Semi Valemei	20 January 1999 (aged 20)	Canberra Raiders
5	BK	Suliasi Vunivalu	27 November 1995 (aged 23)	Melbourne Storm
7	BK	Brayden Wiliame	17 December 1992 (aged 26)	Catalans Dragons

=== Samoa ===
Coach: Matt Parish

Samoa named their 16-man squad on 10 October 2019.

No.	Pos.	Player	Date of birth (age)	Club
8	FW	Bunty Afoa	20 August 1996 (aged 23)	New Zealand Warriors
6	BK	Dean Blore	29 September 1998 (aged 21)	Penrith Panthers
11	FW	Michael Chee-Kam	26 February 1992 (aged 27)	Wests Tigers
10	FW	Tino Fa'asuamaleaui	16 February 2000 (aged 19)	Melbourne Storm
3	BK	Tim Lafai	27 May 1991 (aged 28)	St. George Illawarra Dragons
4	BK	Joseph Leilua (captain)	12 December 1991 (aged 27)	Canberra Raiders
12	FW	Luciano Leilua	8 June 1996 (aged 23)	St. George Illawarra Dragons
13	FW	Moses Leota	20 July 1995 (aged 24)	Penrith Panthers
9	FW	Danny Levi	5 December 1995 (aged 23)	Newcastle Knights
7	BK	Jarome Luai	16 January 1997 (aged 22)	Penrith Panthers
15	BK	Toa Mata'afa	7 April 1997 (aged 22)	Canterbury-Bankstown Bulldogs
2	BK	David Nofoaluma	28 November 1993 (aged 25)	Wests Tigers
14	FW	Ligi Sao	11 October 1992 (aged 27)	New Zealand Warriors
1	BK	Marion Seve	27 May 1995 (aged 24)	Melbourne Storm
16	BK	Jorge Taufua	23 October 1991 (aged 27)	Manly Warringah Sea Eagles
5	BK	Brian To'o	18 August 1998 (aged 21)	Penrith Panthers

=== Tonga ===
Coach: David Tangata-Toa

Tonga named their 16-man squad on 11 October 2019. Included in the squad was two players named "Sione Katoa" - Sione Katoa (born 1997; a winger) and Sione Katoa (born 1995; a hooker). The latter is referred to by his full name, Sione Utia-Katoa, for clarity.

No.	Pos.	Player	Date of birth (age)	Club
7	BK	John Asiata	19 April 1993 (aged 26)	North Queensland Cowboys
1	BK	William Fakatoumafi	25 January 2001 (aged 18)	New Zealand Warriors
10	FW	Andrew Fifita	28 June 1989 (aged 30)	Cronulla-Sutherland Sharks
15	BK	Tevita Funa	3 January 1998 (aged 21)	Manly Warringah Sea Eagles
3	BK	Delouise Hoeter	6 March 1994 (aged 25)	Wynnum Manly Seagulls
12	FW	Peter Hola	27 April 1999 (aged 20)	North Queensland Cowboys
14	FW	Jamil Hopoate	8 November 1994 (aged 24)	Brisbane Broncos
4	BK	Robert Jennings	2 February 1996 (aged 23)	Wests Tigers
2	BK	Sione Katoa	21 August 1997 (aged 22)	Cronulla-Sutherland Sharks
16	BK	Tui Katoa	27 April 1999 (aged 20)	Canterbury-Bankstown Bulldogs
6	BK	Tesi Niu	11 August 2001 (aged 18)	Brisbane Broncos
8	FW	Joe Ofahengaue	15 September 1995 (aged 24)	Brisbane Broncos
11	FW	Tevita Pangai Junior	4 February 1996 (aged 23)	Brisbane Broncos
13	FW	Jason Taumalolo (captain)	31 May 1993 (aged 26)	North Queensland Cowboys
9	FW	Sione Utia-Katoa	26 January 1995 (aged 24)	Penrith Panthers
5	BK	Malakai Watene-Zelezniak	27 August 1991 (aged 28)	Penrith Panthers

== Women ==
=== Australia ===
Coach: Brad Donald

Australia named their 17-person squad on 7 October 2019. Brittany Breayley and Tamika Upton were originally named but withdrew and were replaced by Tarryn Aiken.

No.	Pos.	Player	Date of birth (age)	Club
16	BK	Tarryn Aiken	14 July 1999 (aged 20)	Brisbane Broncos
11	FW	Kezie Apps	4 February 1991 (aged 28)	St. George Illawarra Dragons
13	BK	Shaylee Bent	13 September 2000 (aged 19)	St. George Illawarra Dragons
8	FW	Millie Boyle	19 May 1998 (aged 21)	Brisbane Broncos
7	BK	Ali Brigginshaw (captain)	1 December 1989 (aged 29)	Brisbane Broncos
9	FW	Keeley Davis	5 July 2000 (aged 19)	St. George Illawarra Dragons
15	BK	Kirra Dibb	23 July 1997 (aged 22)	Sydney Roosters
12	FW	Tallisha Harden	21 August 1992 (aged 27)	Sydney Roosters
4	BK	Isabelle Kelly	20 September 1996 (aged 23)	Sydney Roosters
1	BK	Corban McGregor	10 April 1994 (aged 25)	Sydney Roosters
5	BK	Tiana Penitani	12 January 1996 (aged 23)	St. George Illawarra Dragons
14	BK	Julia Robinson	1 June 1998 (aged 21)	Brisbane Broncos
3	BK	Jessica Sergis	15 September 1997 (aged 22)	St. George Illawarra Dragons
10	FW	Hannah Southwell	4 March 1999 (aged 20)	Sydney Roosters
6	BK	Shakiah Tungai	29 November 1996 (aged 22)	St. George Illawarra Dragons
2	BK	Botille Vette-Welsh	13 September 1996 (aged 23)	St. George Illawarra Dragons

=== England ===
Coach: Craig Richards

England women's squad was named on 2 August 2019. Shannon Lacey was ruled out by injury, and was replaced by Georgia Wilson.

No.	Pos.	Player	Date of birth (age)	Club
4	FW	Dannielle Anderson	21 July 1995 (aged 24)	Leeds Rhinos
2	BK	Caitlin Beevers	11 October 2001 (aged 18)	Leeds Rhinos
10	BK	Leah Burke	11 June 1998 (aged 21)	St Helens
3	FW	Chantelle Crowl	16 February 1993 (aged 26)	St Helens
8	BK	Jodie Cunningham	5 December 1991 (aged 27)	St Helens
6	BK	Faye Gaskin	18 March 1992 (aged 27)	St Helens
9	BK	Kelsey Gentles	30 January 1999 (aged 20)	Castleford Tigers
1	BK	Amy Hardcastle	4 March 1989 (aged 30)	Bradford Bulls
14	FW	Shona Hoyle	31 July 1993 (aged 26)	Castleford Tigers
12	FW	Rhiannion Marshall	22 December 1992 (aged 26)	Castleford Tigers
15	FW	Sinead Peach	4 June 1998 (aged 21)	Castleford Tigers
7	FW	Georgia Roche	3 September 2000 (aged 19)	Castleford Tigers
5	FW	Emily Rudge (captain)	11 November 1991 (aged 27)	St Helens
16	BK	Tara-Jane Stanley	4 September 1993 (aged 26)	Castleford Tigers
11	FW	Naomi Williams	7 May 1991 (aged 28)	St Helens
13	BK	Georgia Wilson	23 February 1997 (aged 22)	Wigan Warriors

=== New Zealand ===
Coach: Justin Morgan

New Zealand women's squad was named on 9 October. Lavinia Gould was originally named but was replaced by Kanyon Paul.

No.	Pos.	Player	Date of birth (age)	Club
2		Madison Bartlett	5 December 1994 (aged 24)	New Zealand Warriors
12		Teuila Fotu-Moala	29 November 1993 (aged 25)	St. George Illawarra Dragons
13		Georgia Hale	9 August 1995 (aged 24)	New Zealand Warriors
3		Honey Hireme (captain)	3 May 1981 (aged 38)	New Zealand Warriors
8		Onjeurlina Leiataua	1 December 1995 (aged 23)	New Zealand Warriors
14		Nita Maynard	7 July 1992 (aged 27)	Sydney Roosters
6		Raecene McGregor	23 October 1997 (aged 21)	Brisbane Broncos
4		Jules Newman	23 February 1989 (aged 30)	New Zealand Warriors
1		Apii Nicholls-Pualau	26 February 1993 (aged 26)	New Zealand Warriors
16		Kanyon Paul	5 October 1997 (aged 22)	New Zealand Warriors
7		Charntay Poko	10 November 1995 (aged 23)	New Zealand Warriors
9		Krystal Rota	3 October 1985 (aged 34)	New Zealand Warriors
15		Aieshaleigh Smalley	23 September 1991 (aged 28)	New Zealand Warriors
11		Kiana Takairangi	20 July 1992 (aged 27)	Sydney Roosters
10		Crystal Tamarua	30 July 1995 (aged 24)	New Zealand Warriors
5		Atawhai Tupaea	3 February 1989 (aged 30)	New Zealand Warriors

=== Papua New Guinea ===
Coach: Bagelo Solien

Papua New Guinea women's squad was named on 1 October. Shae-Yvonne De La Cruz and Veronica Waula were originally named but were replaced by Gloria Kaupa and Mellisa Peters. Sera Koroi and Joyce Waula were ruled ineligible to participate due to being under the age of 18.

No.	Pos.	Player	Date of birth (age)	Club
20		Elsie Albert	20 May 1996 (aged 23)	UNRE Cowgirls
2		Catherine Anjo		Hohola Flies
12		Heather Ario		Gabutu Dragons
13		Lekiellia Brown		Wentworthville Magpies
3		Carol Francis		Gabutu Dragons
7		Shirley Joe		Eriku Panthers
10		Janet Johns (captain)		Hanuabada Hawks
4		Roswita Kapo		Paga Panthers
16		Gloria Kaupa		Papua New Guinea
5		Sera Koroi	21 August 2002 (aged 17)	Goodna Eagles
17		Mellisa Peters		
1		Ua Ravu	4 December 1996 (aged 22)	Leeton Greens
15		Jacobeth Wake		Royals Ramu League
9		Joyce Waula		Blackswan Royals
6		Angelo Watego (captain)		Capalaba Warriors
14		Josephine Wong		Nightcliff Dragons
