= James Olds (rugby league) =

Welsh rugby league player

- Full name: James Olds
- Born: 6 April 1991 (age 35) Bridgend, Wales
- Height: 169 cm (5 ft 7 in)
- Weight: 76 kg (168 lb; 12 st 0 lb)
- Notable relative: Ollie Olds (brother)

Rugby union career
- Position: Centre
Youth career
- Tondu RFC
- -2010: Bridgend Athletic
Senior career
| Years | Team | Apps | (Points) |
| 2009–2012 | Bridgend Athletic | 34 | (60) |
| 2013–2016 | Albury Wodonga | | |
- Correct as of 27 February 2024
- Rugby league career

Playing information
- Position: Centre, Wing
Club
| Years | Team | Pld | T | G | FG | P |
|---|---|---|---|---|---|---|
| 2016–2019 | Wests Panthers |
| 2020–2021 | Albury Thunder |
| 2022– | Fortitude Valley Diehards |
| | Total | 0 | 0 | 0 | 0 | 0 |
Representative
| Years | Team | Pld | T | G | FG | P |
| 2018– | Wales | 4 | | | | 42 |

James Olds (born 6 April 1991) is an international Welsh rugby league player who currently plays for Fortitude Valleys Diehards in the Brisbane Rugby League. He mainly plays at centre or on the wing.

== Club career ==
Olds was born in Bridgend in Wales, beginning his career at local side Tondu RFC before moving to Bridgend Athletic RFC, winning the Ospreys Youth League championship. He made his 1st XV debut at 18, playing at the club until 2012 he scored 12 tries in 34 appearances.

He moved to Australia with his brother, Ollie Olds. Playing for Albury Wodonga RUFC winning the Southern Inland Rugby Union Premiership in 2013 and 2015, before joining Brisbane Rugby League side Wests Panthers, winning a minor premiership with the side. In 2020 he joined Albury Thunder. In 2022 he joined Fortitude Valleys Diehards scoring 76 points in his first season.

== International career ==
He made his debut for the Wales national rugby league team in the European Championship 2018, scoring a try and three goals in a 18–54 loss against France. On 11 November 2018 he scored 8 goals in a European Championship win over Ireland, this put him at joint-third for the most goals by a player in a match for Wales, and joint-sixth for most points by a player in a match for Wales. His efforts helped secure a second-place finish for Wales, qualifying them for the 2021 Men's Rugby League World Cup.

In 2019 he played in the 2019 Rugby League World Cup 9s featuring once, in a 23–6 loss against France.

After the 2019 Rugby League World Cup 9s he didn't feature again for Wales until being named in the Wales squad for the 2021 Men's Rugby League World Cup, he did not feature in the competition, however, he started on the wing in a warmup match against Lebanon scoring a solitary goal.
