= Kanyon Paul =

New Zealand rugby league footballer

Personal information
- Born: 5 October 1997 (age 27); Hamilton, New Zealand
- Height: 156 cm (5 ft 1 in)
- Weight: 62 kg (9 st 11 lb)

Playing information
- Position: Hooker
Club
| Years | Team | Pld | T | G | FG | P |
|---|---|---|---|---|---|---|
| 2019– | New Zealand Warriors | 5 | 0 | 0 | 0 | 0 |
| 2022– | Richmond Rovers |
| | Total | 5 | 0 | 0 | 0 | 0 |
Representative
| Years | Team | Pld | T | G | FG | P |
| 2019 | New Zealand 9s | 3 | 1 | 0 | 0 | 4 |
| 2022 | Akarana Falcons | 3 | 1 | 0 | 0 | 4 |
- Source: RLP As of 10 November 2020

Kanyon Paul (born 5 October 1997) is a New Zealand rugby league footballer who plays for the New Zealand Warriors in the NRL Women's Premiership. Primarily a hooker, she is a New Zealand 9s representative.

== Background ==
Born in Hamilton, New Zealand, Paul was a Waikato Rugby Union representative before switching to rugby league.

== Playing career ==
Paul began playing rugby league for the Hamilton City Tigers, where she won a Waikato Rugby League premiership in 2019 alongside New Zealand international Honey Hireme.

On 10 July 2019, Paul joined the New Zealand Warriors NRL Women's Premiership team. In Round 1 of the 2019 NRL Women's season, she made her debut for the Warriors in a 16–12 win over the Sydney Roosters.

In October 2019, she was a member of New Zealand's 2019 Rugby League World Cup 9s-winning squad.

In September 2020, Paul was one of five New Zealand-based Warriors' players to travel to Australia to play in the 2020 NRL Women's premiership. Due to COVID-19 restrictions, the players had to quarantine for 14 days on entering Australia and 14 days on return to New Zealand when the season was completed.
