= Peter Mamouzelos =

Greece international rugby league footballer (born 2001)

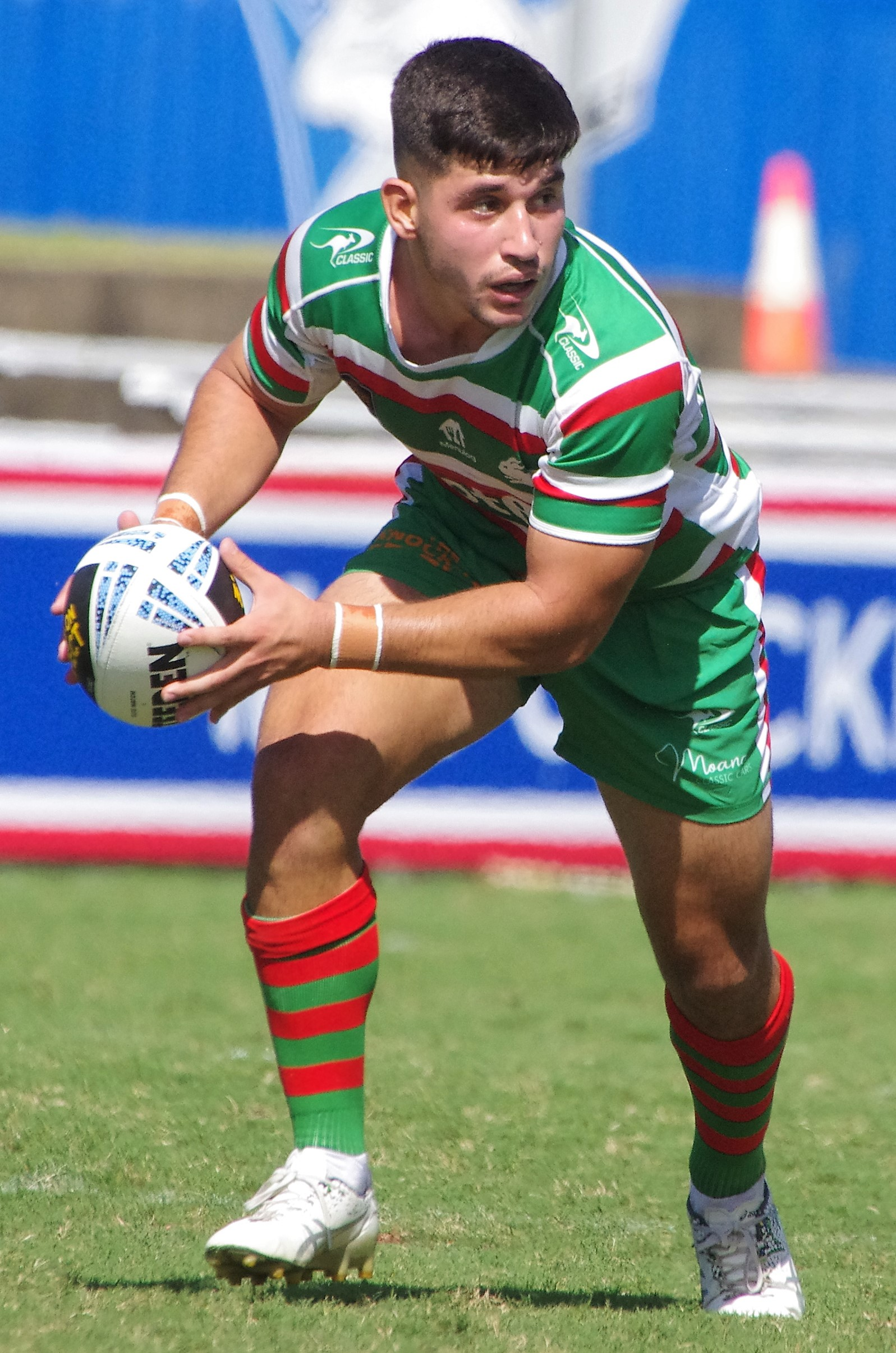

Personal information
- Full name: Peter Mamouzelos
- Born: 9 January 2001 (age 25) Sydney, New South Wales, Australia
- Height: 178 cm (5 ft 10 in)
- Weight: 85 kg (13 st 5 lb)

Playing information
- Position: Hooker
Club
Years	Team	Pld	T	G	FG	P
2021–	South Sydney	50	5	0	0	20
Representative
Years	Team	Pld	T	G	FG	P
2018–22	Greece	10	10	0	0	40
- Source: As of 22 August 2026

Peter Mamouzelos (born 9 January 2001) is a Greek professional rugby league footballer who plays as a hooker for the South Sydney Rabbitohs in the National Rugby League and Greece at international level.

== Background ==
Mamouzelos is of Greek heritage. He played his junior rugby league for the Maroubra Lions. Mamouzelos was educated at Champagnat Catholic College, Pagewood.

== Career ==
=== Early career ===
He has represented Greece in International Rugby League.

=== 2021 ===
Mamouzelos made his debut in round 14 of the 2021 NRL season for South Sydney off the bench against the Newcastle Knights.

=== 2022 ===
Mamouzelos made only two appearances for South Sydney in the 2022 NRL season. In round 25, he scored a try in South Sydney's 26-16 loss against arch-rivals the Sydney Roosters in the first ever match to be played at the new Sydney Football Stadium. Mamouzelos represented Greece at the 2021 Rugby League World Cup and played in all three group games.

=== 2023 ===
Mamouzelos was limited to only two games for Souths in the 2023 NRL season as the club finished 9th on the table and missed the finals. On 24 September, he played for South Sydney in their 2023 NSW Cup grand final victory over North Sydney.

=== 2024 ===
In round 6 of the 2024 NRL season, Mamouzelos was named in the starting side for South Sydney after Damien Cook was demoted to 18th man. He played a total of 19 games for the club throughout the season as they finished 16th on the table.

=== 2025 ===
In round 9 of the 2025 NRL season, Mamouzelos suffered a dislocated elbow in South Sydney's 30-4 loss against Newcastle. He was later ruled out for an indefinite period.

In round 24 of the 2025 NRL season, he scored the go-ahead try to get South Sydney the win against the Parramatta Eels side 20-16 starting in the 9 jersey; in round 25, he set up Jacob Host for his first try of the season with a short ball, and five minutes later, he achieved victory over St. George Illawarra with a 40-0 win.

=== 2026 ===
He was limited to just ten matches for South Sydney in the 2026 NRL season as the club finished 6th on the table and qualified for the finals.

== Statistics ==
Year	Team	Games	Tries	Pts
2021	South Sydney Rabbitohs	3		
2022	South Sydney Rabbitohs	2	1	4
2023	South Sydney Rabbitohs	2		
2024	South Sydney Rabbitohs	19	1	4
2025	South Sydney Rabbitohs	14	3	12
2026	South Sydney Rabbitohs	5		
	Totals	45	5	20
