= Jordan Dezaria =

France international rugby league footballer

Personal information
- Full name: Jordan Dezaria
- Born: 6 November 1996 (age 29) Avignon, Vaucluse, Provence-Alpes-Côte d'Azur, France
- Height: 6 ft 2 in (1.87 m)
- Weight: 15 st 6 lb (98 kg)

Playing information
- Position: Loose forward, Prop, Second-row
Club
Years	Team	Pld	T	G	FG	P
2016–17	Catalans Dragons	5	0	0	0	0
2018	Leigh Centurions	2	0	0	0	0
2018(loan)	→ Oldham	1	1	0	0	4
2018(loan)	→ Workington Town	1	0	0	0	0
2019–20	Toulouse Olympique	13	1	0	0	4
2021–25	Catalans Dragons	83	3	0	0	12
2021(DR)	→ Saint-Estève XIII	0	0	0	0	0
2025(loan)	→ Castleford Tigers	3	0	0	0	0
2026–	Hull Kingston Rovers	10	1	0	0	4
2026(loan)	→ St Helens	1	0	0	0	0
	Total	119	6	0	0	24
Representative
Years	Team	Pld	T	G	FG	P
2019–	France 9s	5	0	0	0	0
2019–	France	8	1	0	0	4
- Source: As of 1 November 2026

Jordan Dezaria (born 6 November 1996) is a French professional rugby league footballer who plays as a prop, second-row or loose forward for Hull Kingston Rovers, and France at international level.

He has previously played for the Catalans Dragons and the Castleford Tigers in the Super League, and for the Leigh Centurions and Toulouse Olympique in the Championship. He has spent time on loan at Oldham and Workington Town in League 1.

== Background ==
Dezaria was born in Avignon, France.

== Career ==
=== Catalans Dragons ===
He made his Super League debut in a match against the Warrington Wolves in June 2016.

=== Leigh Centurions ===
In October 2017 Dezaria signed for the Leigh Centurions on a two-year contract.

=== Catalans Dragons (re-join) ===
In December 2020 Catalans re-signed Dezaria along with Gavin Marguerite.

=== Castleford Tigers (loan) ===
On 15 April 2025, Castleford Tigers announced the signing of Dezaria on a one-month loan from Catalans.

He made his debut on 17 April 2025 in the away Round 8 fixture at Wakefield Trinity.

On 6 May 2025 it was reported that he had been recalled by Catalans Dragons

On 15 October 2025 it was reported that Catalans had released him

=== Hull KR ===
On 28 October 2025 it was reported that he had signed a 3-year deal with Hull KR

=== St Helens (loan) ===
On 31 March 2026 it was reported that he had joined St Helens on a short term loan. He made his début on 3 April 2026, coming off the bench for the 34-24 win over Wigan Warriors.

== International career ==
He was selected in France 9s squad for the 2019 Rugby League World Cup 9s. Dezaria scored the opening try for France in their 2021 Rugby League World Cup campaign as they defeated Greece 34-12.
