= India national rugby league team =

National rugby league team representing India

India
Team information
- Nickname: Jungle Cats
- Region: Asia
- Head coach: Petaia Tiai
- Captain: Vikram Atwal, Jassy Bhullar

Team results
- First international
- India 30–16 Colombia (Brisbane, Australia; 14 July 2019)
- Biggest win
- India 30–16 Colombia (Brisbane, Australia; 14 July 2019)

The India national rugby league team represents India in international rugby league football competitions. They made their international debut against Colombia in Brisbane, Australia on July 14, 2019.

== Results ==
Note: The winning team is given first.

- India 30–16 Colombia

India vs Latin Heat - Blacktown, Sydney 26.10.2019

Result: India 30–26 Latin Heat

== Current squad ==
Inaugural squad vs Colombia - July 14;

- 1.Shaniyat Chowdhury Fullback
- 2.Josh Naidu Wing
- 3.Matt Anirudh Centre
- 4.Sukhpal Malhi Centre
- 18.Joseph Kumar Prop
- 6.Jassy Bhullar Five-eighth
- 7.Michael Sharma Halfback
- 8.Shanil Kumar Prop
- 9.Amoi Singh Hooker
- 10.Nitesh Kumar Prop
- 11.Vikram Atwal Second-row
- 12.Eshaan Shankaar Second-row
- 13.Nick Samra Lock

Substitutes

- 14.Shamal Gounder
- 15.Asif Khan
- 16.Ravi Singh
- 17.Amandip Sharma
- 5.Afsheen Ali (did not play)

India Jungle Cats VS Latin Heat - October 26, 2019

- 1 Michael Sharma Fullback
- 2 Matt Anirudh Wing
- 3 Michael Bhatty Centre
- 4 Sukhpal Malhi Centre
- 5 Joshua Naidu Wing
- 6 Aman Singh Five-eighth
- 7 Jassy Bhullar (VC) Halfback
- 8 Nick Samra Prop
- 9 Amoi Singh Hooker
- 10 Shamal Gounder Prop
- 11 Eshaan Shankar Second-row
- 12 Amith Kumar Second-row
- 13 Vikram Atwal (C) Lock

Substitutes

- 14 Amandip Sharma Utility
- 15 Ravi Singh Prop, Wing
- 16 Faraz Khan Prop
- 17 Shane Magee Prop
- 18 Afsheen Ali Utility

== See also ==
- Rugby League International Federation
