= Allan Lockwood =

Lebanon international rugby league footballer

Personal information
- Full name: Allan Lockwood
- Born: 28 September 1999 (age 27) Kempsey, New South Wales, Australia
- Height: 180 cm (5 ft 11 in)
- Weight: 90 kg (14 st 2 lb)

Playing information
- Position: Centre
Representative
Years	Team	Pld	T	G	FG	P
2019–	Lebanon	1	0	0	0	0
- Source: As of 22 June 2019

Allan Lockwood (born 28 September 1999) is a Lebanon international rugby league footballer who plays as a centre for the Burleigh Bears in the Queensland Cup.

== Career ==
Lockwood made his international debut for Lebanon in their 56-14 defeat by Fiji in the 2019 Pacific Test.
