= Vincent Rennie =

Cook Islands international rugby league footballer

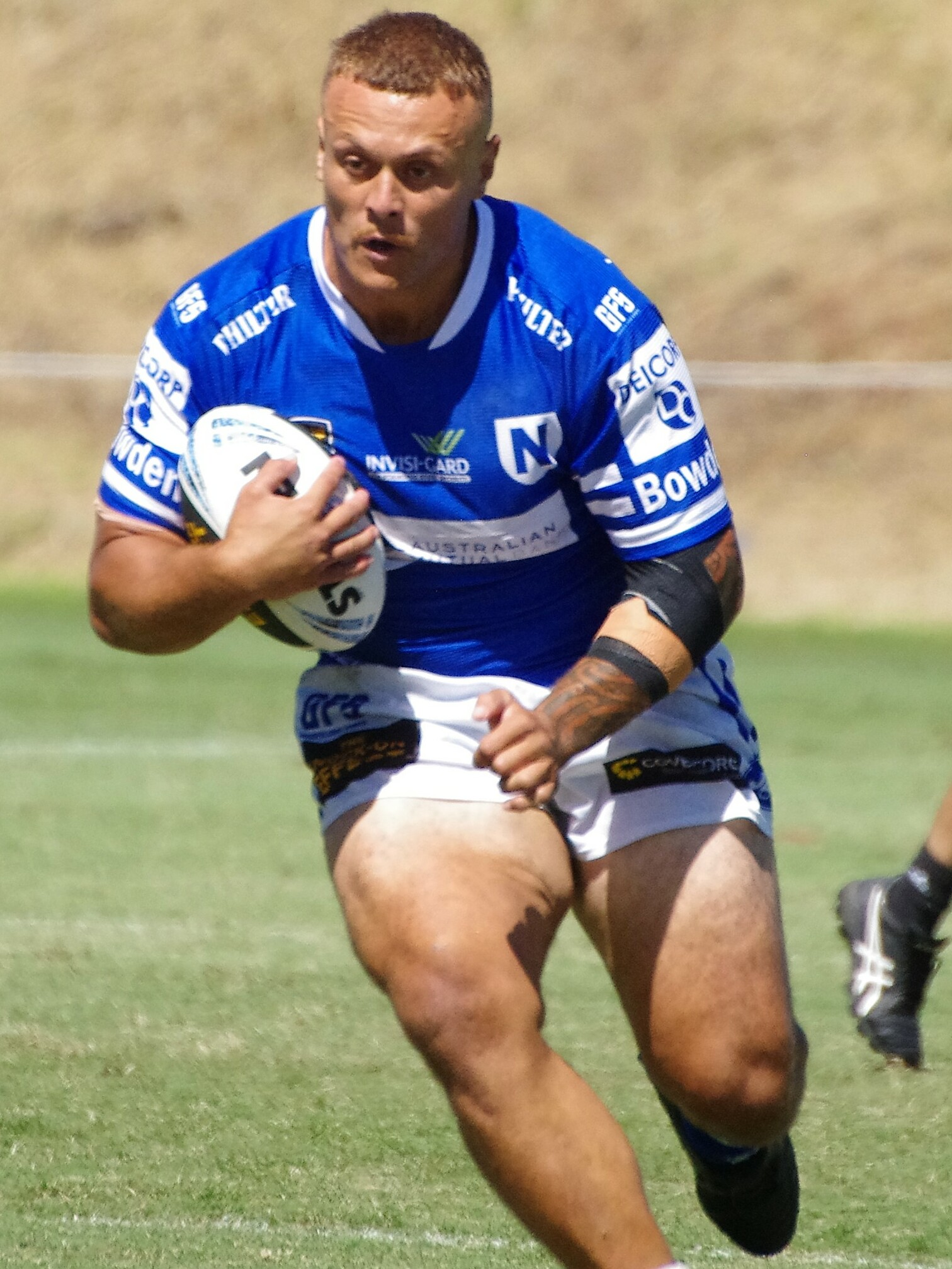

Personal information
- Full name: Vincent Rennie
- Born: 17 June 1994 (age 31); Auckland, New Zealand
- Height: 1.87 m (6 ft 2 in)
- Weight: 113 kg (17 st 11 lb)

Playing information
- Position: Prop
Club
Years	Team	Pld	T	G	FG	P
2016–18	Newcastle Thunder	75	20	0	0	80
Representative
Years	Team	Pld	T	G	FG	P
2015–	Cook Islands	5	2	0	0	8
- Source: As of 31 October 2022
- Relatives: Reubenn Rennie (brother)

Vincent Rennie (born 7 June 1994) is a Cook Islands international rugby league footballer who plays as a prop for the Newtown Jets in the NSW Cup.

He previously played for the Newcastle Thunder in Championship 1 and League 1 between 2015 and 2018.

== Background ==
Rennie was born in Auckland, New Zealand. He is of Cook Islands descent. His brother Reubenn Rennie is a fellow Cook Islands international.

== Playing career ==
=== Club career ===
Rennie played for the Melbourne Storm-Cronulla-Sutherland Sharks joint team in 2014.

He played for the Canterbury-Bankstown Bulldogs and the Auburn Warriors in 2015.

Rennie played for the Newcastle Thunder in Championship 1 and League 1 between 2016 and 2018.

He played for the Mount Pritchard Mounties between 2019 and 2021.

Rennie joined the Newtown Jets ahead of the 2022 NSW Cup season.

=== International career ===
Rennie made his international debut for the Cook Islands in October 2015 against Tonga.

In 2022 he was named in the Cook Islands squad for the 2021 Rugby League World Cup.
