= Moses Noovao-McGreal =

Cook Islands international rugby league footballer

Moses Noovao McGreal
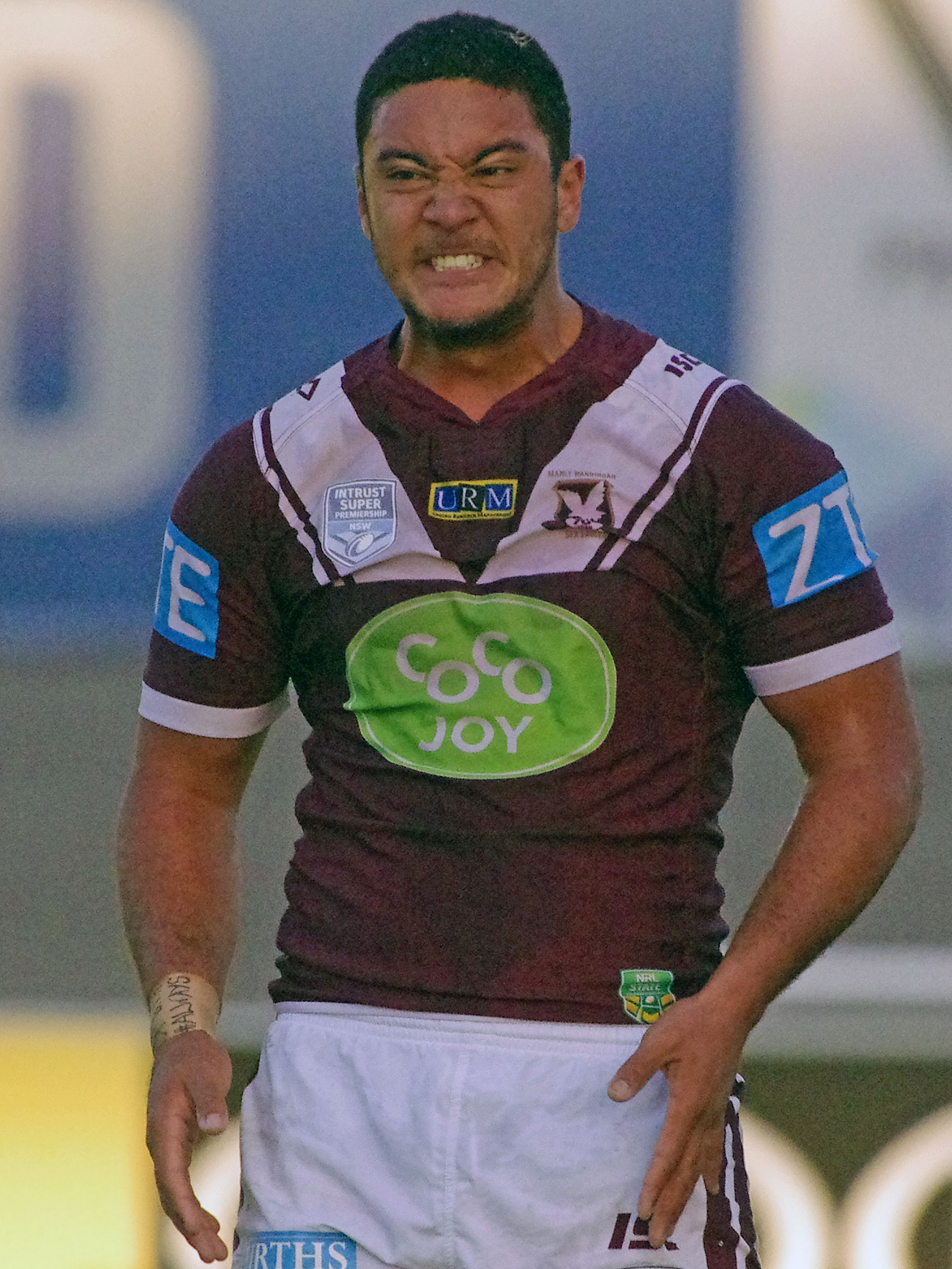

Personal information
- Full name: Moses Noovao-McGreal
- Born: 7 December 1996 (age 29) Auckland, New Zealand
- Height: 1.84 m (6 ft 0 in)
- Weight: 102 kg (16 st 1 lb)

Playing information
- Position: Lock, Second-row, Prop
Representative
Years	Team	Pld	T	G	FG	P
2015–	Cook Islands	6	0	0	0	0
- Source: As of 31 October 2022

Moses Noovao-McGreal (born 7 December 1996) is a Cook Islands international rugby league footballer who plays as a lock, second-row or hooker for the Norths Devils in the Queensland Cup.

== Background ==
Noovao-McGreal was born in Auckland, New Zealand. He is of Cook Islands descent.

He played his junior rugby league for the Noosa Pirates.

== Playing career ==
=== Club career ===
Noovao-McGreal played in the NSW Cup for the Manly-Warringah Sea Eagles between 2015 and 2016.

He joined the Norths Devils ahead of the 2018 Queensland Cup season.

=== International career ===
In 2016 Noovao-McGreal made his international début for the Cook Islands against Lebanon.

He played for the Cook Islands at the 2019 Rugby League World Cup 9s. He made three appearances without scoring a try at the competition.

In 2022 Noovao-McGreal was named in the Cook Islands squad for the 2021 Rugby League World Cup.
