= Kayne Kalache =

Lebanon international rugby league footballer

Personal information
- Full name: Kayne Kalache
- Born: 10 June 1998 (age 28) Sydney, Australia
- Height: 191 cm (6 ft 3 in)
- Weight: 107 kg (16 st 12 lb)

Playing information
- Position: Lock, Second-row, Prop
Representative
Years	Team	Pld	T	G	FG	P
2019–	Lebanon	4	0	0	0	0
2019–	Lebanon 9s	3	0	0	0	0
- Source: As of 4 November 2022

Kayne Kalache is a Lebanon international rugby league footballer who plays as a second-row or prop for the Blacktown Workers Sea Eagles in the NSW Cup. Kayne signed a second tier contract for Parramatta Eels, with his chance to push for a first grade spot.

== Career ==
Kalache made his international debut for Lebanon in their 56–14 loss to Fiji in the 2019 Pacific Test.

=== 2025 ===
Kayne had a strong year playing for Parramatta Eels in the NSW Cup playing 15 games and starting 5 in the front row for 3 wins 1 loss 1 draw.
