= Charlie Bouzinac =

France international rugby league footballer

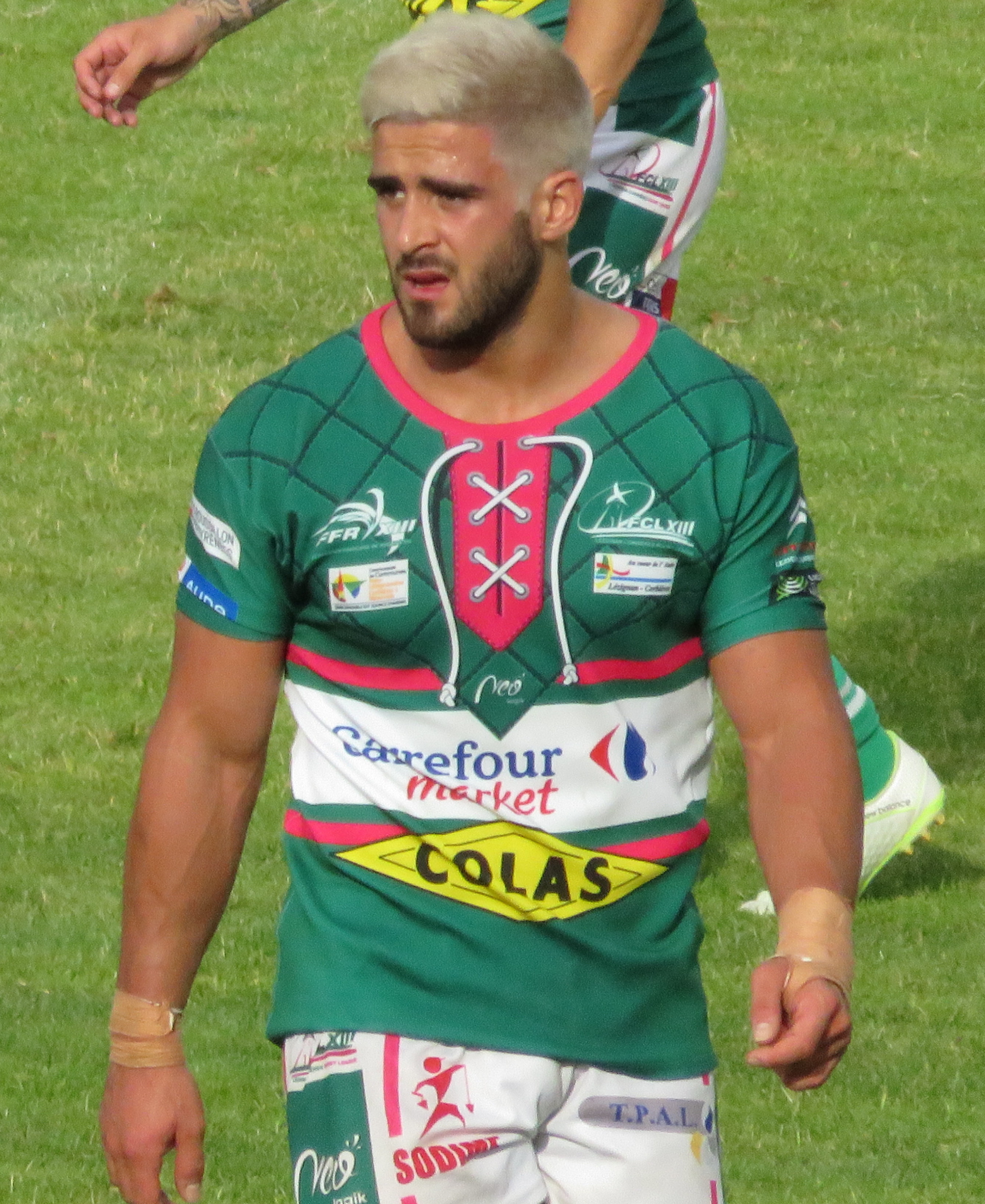

Personal information
- Full name: Charles Bouzinac
- Born: 10 January 1994 (age 32) France
- Height: 5 ft 9 in (1.74 m)
- Weight: 13 st 8 lb (86 kg)

Playing information
- Position: Hooker
Club
Years	Team	Pld	T	G	FG	P
2012–14	Saint-Esteve XIII Catalan	13	1	0	0	4
2014	Limoux Grizzlies	0	0	0	0	0
2014–16	Lézignan Sangliers	43	16	58	0	180
2016	Central Queensland Capras	9
2016–17	Lézignan Sangliers	14	3	9	0	30
2017–18	Toulouse Olympique	28	7	1	0	30
2018–	Lézignan Sangliers	16	1	23	0	50
	Total	123	28	91	0	294
Representative
Years	Team	Pld	T	G	FG	P
2015	France	1	1	0	0	4
2019–	France 9s	3	0	0	0	0
- Source: As of 19 October 2019

Charles Bouzinac (born 10 January 1994) is a French international rugby league footballer who plays as a hooker for Lézignan Sangliers in the Elite One Championship. He previously played for Toulouse Olympique in the Championship.

Bouzinac previously played for the Central Queensland Capras in the Queensland Cup.

Charles Bouzinac played for Saint-Esteve XIII Catalan and Lézignan Sangliers in the Elite One Championship.

== International career ==
He made his France début in 2015 against Serbia. He has also trained with the France A squad and represented his nation at junior level.

He was selected in France 9s squad for the 2019 Rugby League World Cup 9s.
