= Tevin Arona =

Cook Islands international rugby league footballer

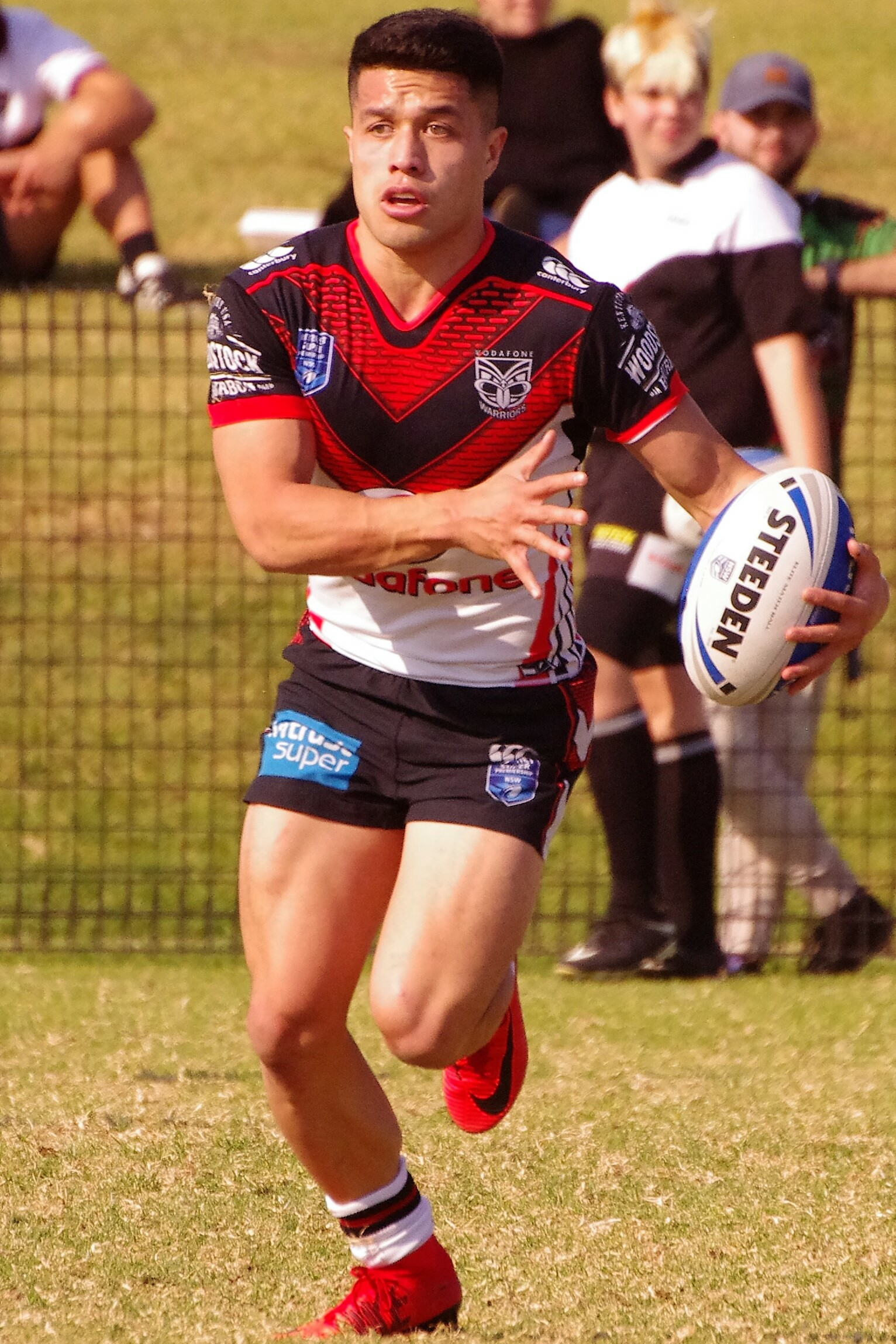

Personal information
- Full name: Tevin Arona
- Born: 5 September 1995 (age 29); New Zealand

Playing information
- Position: Hooker, Halfback, Five-eighth
Representative
Years	Team	Pld	T	G	FG	P
2019–	Cook Islands	2	1	0	0	4
- Source: As of 31 October 2022

Tevin Arona (born 5 September 1995) is a Cook Islands international rugby league footballer who plays as a hooker, halfback or five-eighth for the Auckland Vulcans.

== Background ==
Arona was born in New Zealand. He is of Cook Islands descent.

He played his junior rugby league for the Hornby Panthers.

== Playing career ==
=== Club career ===
Arona played in the NSW Cup for the New Zealand Warriors between 2017 and 2019.

He joined the Tweed Seagulls ahead of the 2021 Queensland Cup season.

Arona joined the Auckland Vulcans ahead of the 2022 season.

=== International career ===
Arona played for the Cook Islands at the 2019 Rugby League World Cup 9s. He made three appearances and scored a try at the competition.

In 2019 he made his international début for the Cook Islands against the United States of America.

In 2022 Arona was named in the Cook Islands squad for the 2021 Rugby League World Cup.
