= Jayden El-Jalkh =

Australian rugby league footballer

Personal information
- Born: 26 September 1997 (age 29) Sydney, Australia
- Height: 179 cm (5 ft 10 in)
- Weight: 85 kg (13 st 5 lb)

Playing information
- Position: Centre
Club
Years	Team	Pld	T	G	FG	P
	Western Suburbs	0	0	0	0	0
Representative
Years	Team	Pld	T	G	FG	P
2019–	Lebanon	1	0	0	0	0
2019–	Lebanon 9s	3	0	2	0	4
- Source: As of 20 October 2019

Jayden El-Jalkh, also known by the nickname of "Jack-in-the-box", is a Lebanon international rugby league footballer who plays as a winger for the Western Suburbs Magpies in the NSW Cup.

== Career ==
El-Jalkh made his international debut for Lebanon in their 56-14 defeat by Fiji in the 2019 Pacific Test.
