= Paul Marcon =

France international rugby league footballer

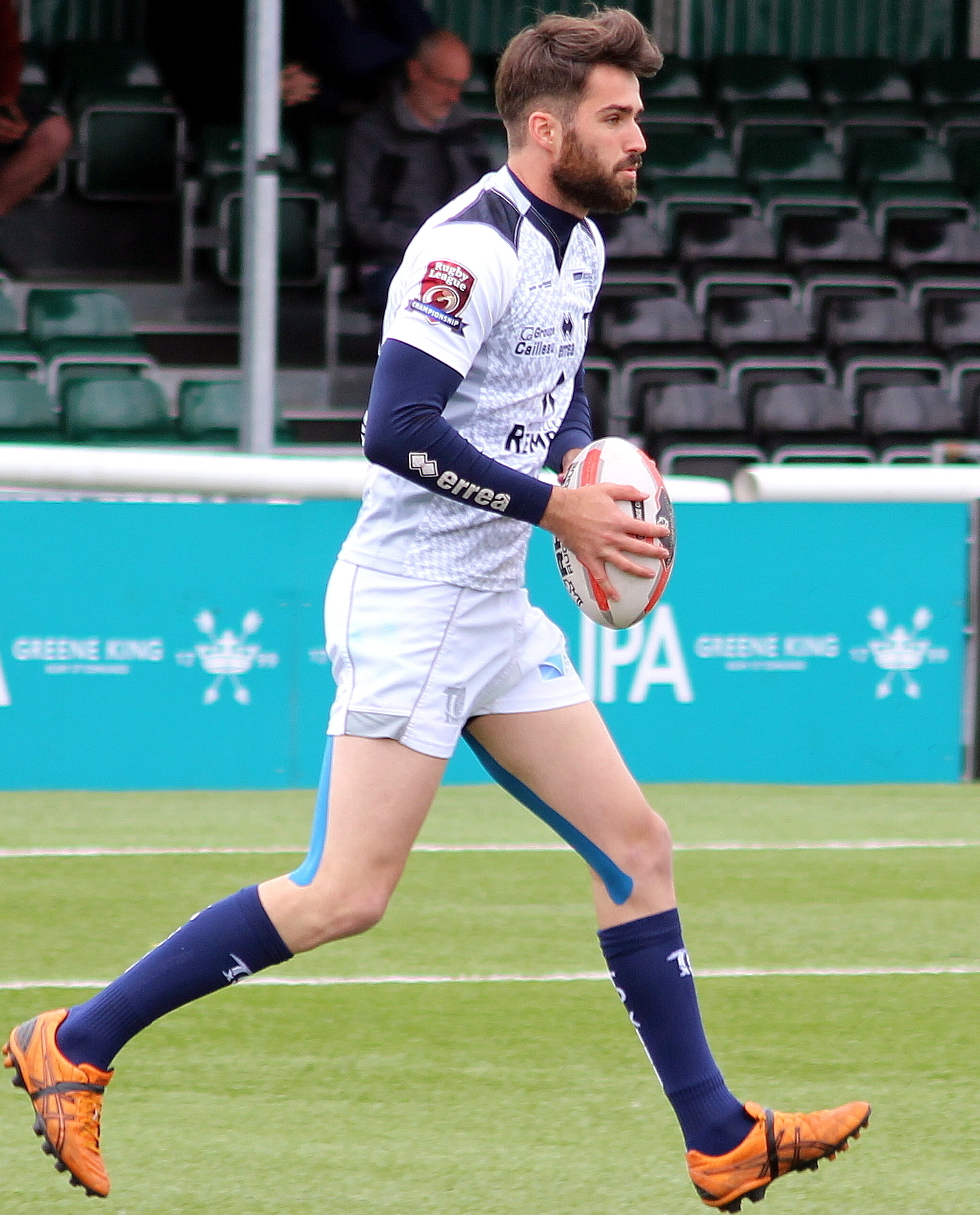

Personal information
- Born: 10 July 1995 (age 31) Tonneins, Lot-et-Garonne, Nouvelle-Aquitaine, France
- Height: 6 ft 3 in (1.91 m)
- Weight: 14 st 5 lb (91 kg)

Playing information
- Position: Wing
Club
| Years | Team | Pld | T | G | FG | P |
|---|---|---|---|---|---|---|
| 2012–13 | Villeneuve | 2 | 0 | 0 | 0 | 0 |
| 2013– | Toulouse Olympique | 96 | 52 | 0 | 0 | 208 |
| 2015(loan) | → Toulouse Broncos | 15 | 7 | 1 | 0 | 30 |
| 2016(loan) | → Toulouse Broncos | 4 | 3 | 0 | 0 | 12 |
| 2017(loan) | → Toulouse Broncos | 13 | 3 | 16 | 0 | 44 |
| | Total | 130 | 65 | 17 | 0 | 294 |
Representative
| Years | Team | Pld | T | G | FG | P |
| 2018– | France | 6 | 3 | 0 | 0 | 12 |
| 2019– | France 9s | 3 | 1 | 0 | 0 | 4 |
- Source: As of 13 October 2026

Paul Marcon (born 10 July 1995) is a French professional rugby league footballer who plays as a winger for Toulouse Olympique in the Super League and France at international level.

== Background ==
He is a relative of former French international Serge Marcon.

== Domestic career ==
He then began his playing career at Villeneuve before joining Toulouse as a youngster.

Marcon has spent time playing on loan for the Toulouse Broncos.

=== Toulouse Olympique ===
In July 2020, Toulouse announced that Marcon had signed a contract extension until the end of the 2022 season. Macron played 16 games for Toulouse Olympique in the 2022 Super League season as they were relegated back to the RFL Championship after finishing bottom of the table.

== International career ==
Marcon has played for France at youth team level.

He was selected in France 9s squad for the 2019 Rugby League World Cup 9s.
