= Bilal Maarbani =

Lebanon international rugby league footballer

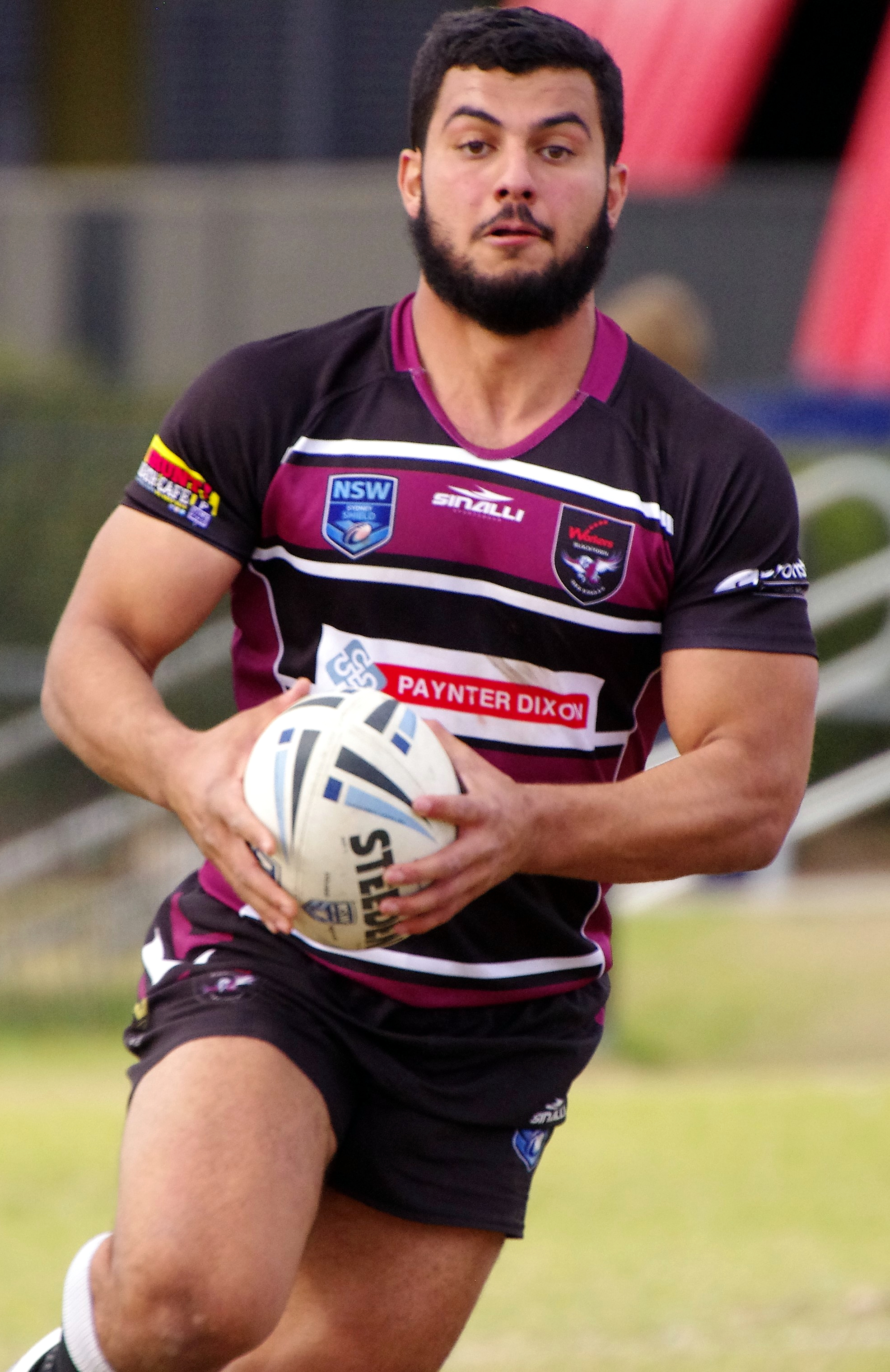

Personal information
- Born: 12 February 1998 (age 28) Sydney, New South Wales, Australia
- Height: 184 cm (6 ft 0 in)
- Weight: 95 kg (14 st 13 lb)

Playing information
- Position: Centre, Wing
Club
Years	Team	Pld	T	G	FG	P
2021–	Manly Warringah	0	0	0	0	0
Representative
Years	Team	Pld	T	G	FG	P
2017–	Lebanon	4	2	4	0	16
2019	Lebanon 9s	3	3	0	0	12
- Source: As of 26 October 2022

Bilal Maarbani (12 February 1998) is a Lebanon international rugby league footballer who plays as a centre or winger for the Blacktown Workers Sea Eagles in the NSW Cup.

He was selected to represent the Lebanon in the 2017 Rugby League World Cup and at the 2019 Rugby League World Cup 9s.

== Early career and personal life ==
Born in Sydney, Australia, Maarbani is of Lebanese descent through his parents, who were born in 1973 in Tripoli, Lebanon. He played his junior rugby league for Bankstown Sports, and attended Bass Hill High School. He is an apprentice electrician.

== Playing career ==
Maarbani originally signed with the Canterbury-Bankstown Bulldogs, but moved to the Manly-Warringah Sea Eagles at the start of the 2017 season. He played in Manly's 2017 Under 20s grand final win 20-16 against Parramatta Eels, scoring a try before half time.

He was selected to represent the Lebanon in the 2017 Rugby League World Cup.
