= Thomas Lasvenes =

France international rugby league footballer

Personal information
- Full name: Thomas Lasvenes
- Born: 6 May 1996 (age 28)
- Height: 5 ft 8 in (1.73 m)
- Weight: 11 st 11 lb (75 kg)

Playing information
- Position: Fullback
Club
Years	Team	Pld	T	G	FG	P
2014–17	Limoux Grizzlies
2019–	Villeneuve Leopards
	Total	0	0	0	0	0
Representative
Years	Team	Pld	T	G	FG	P
	France 9s
- Source: As of 11 January 2021

Thomas Lasvenes (born 6 May 1996) is a French rugby league footballer currently for Villeneuve Leopards in the Elite One Championship. He is a fullback. He previously played for the Limoux Grizzlies and represented France in the 2019 Rugby League World Cup 9s.

== Playing career ==
=== Villeneuve XIII RLLG ===
On 24 Jul 2019 it was reported that he had signed for Villeneuve XIII RLLG in the Elite One Championship
