= Gavin Marguerite =

France international rugby league footballer

Gav Marguerite
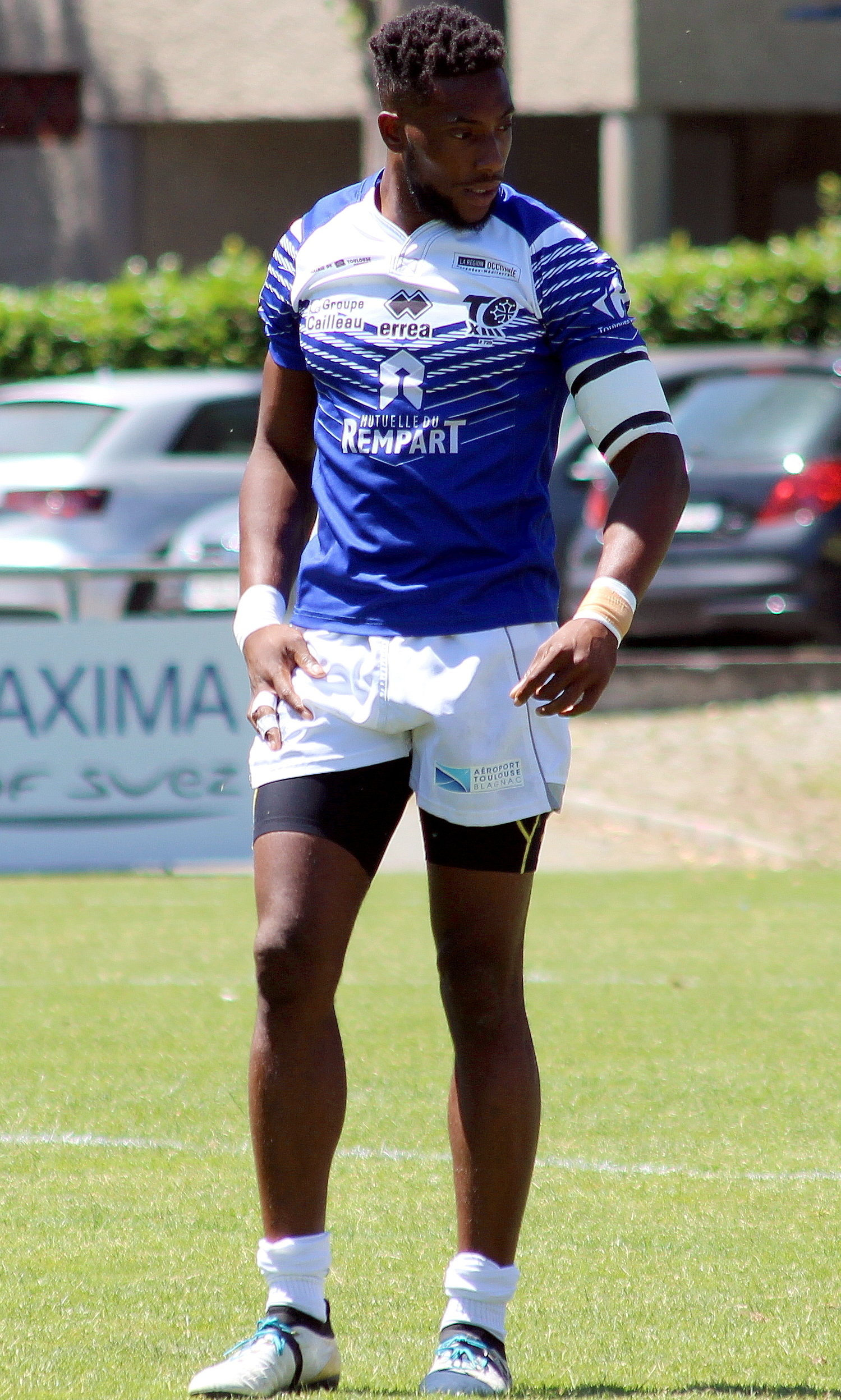

Personal information
- Full name: Gavin Marguerite
- Born: 12 August 1996 (age 29) France
- Height: 6 ft 2 in (1.88 m)
- Weight: 13 st 12 lb (88 kg)

Playing information
- Position: Centre, Wing
Club
| Years | Team | Pld | T | G | FG | P |
|---|---|---|---|---|---|---|
| 2016–19 | Toulouse Olympique | 70 | 40 | 0 | 0 | 160 |
| 2020 | Catalans Dragons | 0 | 0 | 0 | 0 | 0 |
| 2020(loan) | → Saint-Esteve | 3 | 1 | 0 | 0 | 4 |
| 2020–23 | Villeneuve Leopards | 6 | 4 | 0 | 0 | 16 |
| | Total | 79 | 45 | 0 | 0 | 180 |
Representative
| Years | Team | Pld | T | G | FG | P |
| 2018 | France | 1 | 0 | 0 | 0 | 0 |
| 2019 | France 9s | 3 | 2 | 0 | 0 | 8 |
- Source: As of 4 April 2023

Gavin Marguerite (born 12 August 1996) is a French former professional rugby league footballer who last played as a centre and winger for the Villeneuve Leopards in the Elite One Championship

He previously played for Toulouse Olympique in the Championship and the Catalans Dragons in the Super League.

== Playing career ==
=== Toulouse Olympique ===
Marguerite joined Toulouse in 2016 and made 70 appearances in four seasons, scoring 40 tries.

=== Catalans Dragons ===
After leaving Toulouse at the end of 2019, he signed for Super League side Catalans Dragons ahead of the 2020 season but made no first team appearances.

=== Ottawa Aces ===
On 15 August 2020 it was reported that he had signed for Ottawa Aces in the RFL League 1, however COVID-19 delayed their entry into League 1 until 2022.

=== Villeneuve XIII RLLG ===
On 19 November 2020 it was reported that he had signed for Villeneuve XIII RLLG in the Elite One Championship due to the Ottawa Aces situation. In March 2023 it was announced Marguerite was banned from all competition for three years with effect from 15 December 2022 for drug offences. The ban was imposed by the French Anti-Doping Agency after Marguerite tested positive for the use of an anabolic steroid and testosterone. Upon the announcement of the ban Marguerite announced his immediate retirement from rugby.

== International ==
He was selected in France 9s squad for the 2019 Rugby League World Cup 9s.
