= 2022 Papua New Guinea Hunters season =

Papua New Guinea rugby league club

- Queensland Cup Rank: 12
- 2022 record: Wins: 7; draws: 1; losses: 11
- Points scored: For: 389; against: 531

Team information
- CEO: Scott Barker
- Coach: Matthew Church
- Captain: Ila Alu & Kevin Appo
- Stadium: Bycroft Oval, Gold Coast

Top scorers
- Tries: 8 (Wane)
- Goals: 33 (Kingstimer Paraia)
- Points: 79 (Kingstimer Paraia)
← 2021	2023 →

The Papua New Guinea Hunters is a professional rugby league club from Papua New Guinea that participates in the Queensland Cup in Australia. Their 2022 official 27-man squad relocated to Runaway Bay, Gold Coast for the second year in a row. The 2022 Hostplus Cup was the PNG Hunters' ninth season in rugby league's Queensland Cup after securing their future with a four-year license from 2019 until 2022. They reappointed Matt Church as their head coach to be supported by Assistant Coaches, Stanley Tepend and Paul Aiton. Two of the Hunters players, Anthony Worot and Sherwin Tanabi, were given a one week train and trial with the Cowboys Young Guns and featured in the trial match for the Young Guns against the Mackay Cutters.

The Hunters announced a new strategic player pathways partnership with Dolphins, with four PNG Hunters players joining Dolphins for a full NRL pre-season. Two of these players remained with the Dolphins for the full NRL season commencing in 2023, and played for the Hunters on the weekends when not in the Top 17 team.

== Season summary ==
- Round 1:

=== Milestone games ===
Round	Player	Milestone
Round 1	Rodrick Tai (#100), Mark Tony (#101), Wesser Tenza (#102), Kingstimer Paraia (#103)	Hostplus Cup debuts
Round 1	Kevin Appo	PNG Hunters captaincy debut
Round 3	Mathew Jesse (#104), Jamie Mavoko (#105), Anthony Worot (#106)	Hostplus Cup debuts
Round 3	Rodrick Tai	Scored his first Hostplus Cup try
Round 5	Sherwin Tanabi (#107)	HC debut
Round 7	Kitron Laka (#108)	HC debut
Round 8	Tyler Han (#109)	HC debut
Round 8	Brandon Nima	PNG Hunters captaincy debut
Round 8	Tony Worot, Mathew Jesse and Tyler Han	Scored their first Hostplus cup tries
Round 10	Kitron Laka	Scored his first Hostplus cup try
Round 13	Dilbert Isaac	50th Hostplus cup match
Round 15	Judah Rimbu	scored his first Hostplus Cup try
Round 16	Brandon Nima	50th Hostplus cup match
Round 16	Liam Joseph (#110) and Francis Kembis (#111)	Hostplus Cup debuts
Round 16	Liam Joseph	scored his first Hostplus Cup try
Round 17	Francis Kembis	scored his first Hostplus Cup try
Round 19	Wesser Tenza	scored his first Hostplus Cup try

== 2022 squad ==
PNG Hunters
First team squad		Coaching staff
Tyler Han – FB, SO; Brandon Nima – CE, WG (vc); Benji Kot – CE, SR; Rodrick Tai – CE, WG, SR; Solo Wane – WG; Kingstimer Paraia – SO, HK; Judah Rimbu – HB, HK, SO; Francis Kembis – PR, SR; Wartovo Puara – HK; Sylvester Namo – PR, SR; Sherwin Tanabi – SR; Kevin Appo – SR, LK (c); Ila Alu – LK, PR (c)	Emmanuel Waine – SR, CE, LK; Wesser Tenza – HK; Dilbert Isaac – PR, LK; Junior Rop – LK, PR; Kitron Laka – SR; Liam Joseph – WG; Mark Tony – SO, HB; Gilimo Paul – CE, LK; Jordan Pat – PR; Jamie Mavoko – HB, SO; Mathew Jesse – FB, WG; Terry Wapi – WG, FB; Samuel Yegip – PR	Head coach: Matthew Church; Assistant coaches: Paul Aiton; Stanley Tepend; Legend: (c) Captain(s); (vc) Vice-captain(s); Updated: 27 January 2022; Source(s):

== Squad movement ==
=== Gains ===
Player	Signed from	Until end of	Notes
Mathew Jesse	Waghi Tumbe	2022	
Francis Kembis	Waghi Tumbe	2022	
Liam Joseph	Rabaul Gurias	2022	
Kitron Laka	Lae Snax Tigers	2022	
Jamie Mavoko	Lae Snax Tigers	2022	
Junior Rop	Lae Snax Tigers	2022	
Rodrick Tai	Lae Snax Tigers	2022	
Sherwin Tanabi	Lae Snax Tigers	2022	
Mark Tony	Lae Snax Tigers	2022	
Wesser Tenza	Mendi Muruks	2022	
Kingstimer Paraia	Port Moresby Vipers	2022	
Tyler Han	Runaway Bay Seagulls	2022	

=== Losses ===
Player	Signed to	Until end of	Notes
Stanton Albert	Port Moresby Vipers	2022	
Ase Boas	Rabaul Gurias	2022	
Enoch Maki	Port Moresby Vipers	2022	
Jokadi Bire	Retired on Medical condition	2022	
Casey Dickson	Villeneuve XIII RLLG	2022	
Jeffrey Robert	Hela Wigmen	2022	
Charlie Simon	Mendi Muruks	2022	
Mark Piti	Lae Snax Tigers	2022	
Joe Joshua	Mt. Hagen Eagles	2022	
Norman Brown	Hela Wigmen	2022	
Brendon Gotuno	Port Moresby Vipers	2022	
Edwin Ipape	Leigh Centurions	2022	
Epel Kapinias	Wynnum Manly Seagulls	2022	
Solomon Pokare	Hela Wigmen	2022	
Junior Rau	Mt. Hagen Eagles	2022	
Anthony Worot	Kimbe Cutters	2022	
Samuel Yegip	Hela Wigmen	2022	

== Ladder ==
Pos	Team	Pld	W	D	L	B	PF	PA	PD	Pts
1	Burleigh Bears	19	14	1	4	1	634	356	278	31
2	Sunshine Coast Falcons	19	13	1	5	1	470	326	144	29
3	Redcliffe Dolphins	19	12	0	7	1	518	359	159	26
4	Norths Devils	19	12	0	7	1	469	459	10	26
5	Central Queensland Capras	19	11	1	7	1	472	394	78	25
6	Tweed Heads Seagulls	19	10	1	8	1	474	388	86	23
7	Brisbane Tigers	19	10	1	8	1	452	454	-2	23
8	Northern Pride RLFC	19	9	1	9	1	370	391	-21	21
9	Wynnum Manly Seagulls	19	9	0	10	1	494	422	72	20
10	Townsville Blackhawks	19	7	2	10	1	445	443	2	18
11	Mackay Cutters	19	8	0	11	1	444	484	-40	18
12	Papua New Guinea Hunters	19	7	1	11	1	389	531	-142	17
13	Ipswich Jets	19	4	0	15	1	326	712	-384	10
14	Souths Logan Magpies	19	2	1	15	1	346	586	-240	7

- The team highlighted in blue clinched the minor premiership.
- Teams highlighted in green qualified for the finals.
- The team highlighted in red clinched the wooden spoon.

== Fixtures ==
=== Pre-season ===
Date	Round	Opponent	Venue	Score	Tries	Goals
Saturday 5 March	Trial 1	CQ Capras	Gladstone	10-20	Wane, Paraia	Paraia goal
Saturday 12 March	Trial 2	Wests Panthers	Frank Lind Oval, Mitchelton	18-14		
Legend: Win Loss Draw Bye

=== Regular season ===
Date	Round	Opponent	Venue	Score	Tries	Goals	Attendance
Saturday, 19 March	Round 1	Mackay Cutters	BB Print Stadium	16-10	Wane, Isaac	Rimbu 4 goals	
Saturday, 26 March	Round 2	CQ Capras	Browne Park	16-26	Paraia, Wapi, Nima	Rimbu 2 goals	
Sunday, 3 April	Round 3	Brisbane Tigers	Bycroft Oval, Gold Coast	12-22	Tai, Waine	Mavoko 2 goals	
Saturday, 9 April	Round 4	Sunshine Coast Falcons	Bycroft Oval, Gold Coast	8-22	Appo	Mavoko 2 goals	
Monday, 25 April	Round 5	Burleigh Bears	Pizzey Park	0-34			
Saturday, 30th April	Round 6	BYE					
Saturday, 7 May	Round 7	Norths Devils	Bycroft Oval, Gold Coast	24-28	Wane, Nima, Wapi, Paraia	Paraia 4 goals	
Friday, 13 May	Round 8	Townsville Blackhawks	Jack Manski Oval	42-20	Namo 2, Jesse, Worot, Nima, Wane, Waine, Han	Paraia 5 goals	
Saturday, 21 May	Round 9	Redcliffe Dolphins	Bycroft Oval, Gold Coast	16-30	Namo, Tai, Isaac	Mavoko 2 goals	
Sunday, 5 June	Round 10	Tweed Heads Seagulls	Tugun RLFC, Tugun	22-24	Appo, Nima, Laka, Wapi	Mavoko 2, Paraia goals	
Saturday, 11 June	Round 11	Souths Logan Magpies	Bycroft Oval, Gold Coast	26-22	Isaac 2, Wapi, Tai, Wane	Mavoko 2, Paraia goals	
Sunday, 19 June	Round 12	Northern Pride	Barlow Park	6-30	Gilmo	Tony goal	
Saturday, 2 July	Round 13	Ipswich Jets	North Ipswich Reserve	18-36	Wane, Nima, Tai	Mavoko 3 goals	
Saturday, 9 July	Round 14	Wynnum Manly Seagulls	BMD Kougari Oval, Brisbane	36-22	Wane 2, Laka, Appo, Rop, Alu	Paraia 5, Rimbu goals	
Sunday, 17 July	Round 15	CQ Capras	Bycroft Oval, Gold Coast	24-62	Nima, Appo, Rimbu, Tai	Paraia 4 goals	
Saturday, 23 July	Round 16	Brisbane Tigers	John Kerr Park, Cunnamulla	32-24	Laka 2, Han, Paraia, Pat, Joseph	Rimbu 4 goals	
Sunday, 7 August	Round 17	Sunshine Coast Falcons	Sunshine Coast Stadium	6-44	Kembis	Paraia goal	
Saturday, 13 August	Round 18	Townsville Blackhawks	Bycroft Oval, Gold Coast	23-23	Kot 2, Wane, Laka	Paraia 3 goals, 1 drop goal	
Saturday, 20 August	Round 19	Burleigh Bears	Bycroft Oval	32-24	Han, Kot, Tenza, Rimbu, Kembis	Paraia 5 goals, 1 pen.	
Saturday, 27 August	Round 20	Mackay Cutters	PNG Football Stadium	30-28	Tai, Kot, Joseph, Waine, Tanabi, Puara	Paraia 3 goals	
Legend: Win Loss Draw Bye

== Statistics ==
Name	App	T	G	FG	Pts
Ila Alu	8	1	-	-	4
Keven Appo	16	4	-	-	16
Casey Dickson	3	-	-	-	-
Tyler Han	10	3	-	-	12
Dilbert Isaac	15	4	-	-	16
Mathew Jesse	7	1	-	-	4
Liam Joseph	4	2	-	-	8
Francis Kembis	5	2	-	-	8
Benji Kot	10	4	-	-	16
Kitron Laka	12	5	-	-	20
Jamie Mavoko	9	-	13	-	26
Sylvester Namo	16	3	-	-	12
Brandon Nima	18	6	-	-	24
Kingstimer Paraia	17	3	33	1	79
Jordan Pat	8	1	-	-	4
Gilimo Paul	8	1	-	-	4
Wartovo Puara	14	1	-	-	4
Judah Rimbu	13	2	11	-	30
Junior Rop	17	1	-	-	4
Rodrick Tai	15	6	-	-	24
Sherwin Tanabi	15	1	-	-	4
Wesser Tenza	13	1	-	-	4
Mark Tony	13	-	1	-	2
Emmanuel Waine	18	3	-	-	12
Solo Wane	17	8	-	-	32
Terry Wapi	8	4	-	-	16
Tony Worot	3	1	-	-	4
Samuel Yegip	11	-	-	-	-
Totals		68	58	1	389

== Representatives ==
The following players played representative matches in 2022.

	Pacific Test	PNG Prime Minister's XIII	World Cup
Dilbert Isaac	PNG Kumuls		
Solo Wane	PNG Kumuls		
Wartovo Puara	PNG Kumuls	PNG Prime Minister's XIII	
Sylvester Namo	PNG Kumuls	PNG Prime Minister's XIII	
Emmanuel Waine	PNG Kumuls	PNG Prime Minister's XIII	
Keven Appo		PNG Prime Minister's XIII	
Rodrick Tai		PNG Prime Minister's XIII	
Sherwin Tanabi		PNG Prime Minister's XIII	
Wesser Tenza		PNG Prime Minister's XIII	
Judah Rimbu		PNG Prime Minister's XIII	
Francis Kembis		PNG Prime Minister's XIII	
Brandon Nima		PNG Prime Minister's XIII	
