= 2023 Papua New Guinea Hunters season =

Rugby league team season

- Queensland Cup Rank: 10
- 2023 record: Wins: 9; draws: 1; losses: 10
- Points scored: For: 464; against: 514

Team information
- CEO: Scott Barker
- Coach: Stanley Tepend
- Captain: Ila Alu
- Stadium: PNG Football Stadium

Top scorers
- Tries: 11 (Morea Morea)
- Goals: 37 (Jamie Mavoko)
- Points: 86 (Jamie Mavoko)
← 2022	2024 →

The 2023 Hostplus Cup was the PNG Hunters' tenth season in rugby league's Queensland Cup. The Papua New Guinea Hunters is a professional rugby league club from Papua New Guinea.

== Train and trial partnership with Dolphins (NRL) ==
The PNG Hunters' strategic partnership with Dolphins saw four Hunters players, Tai, Tanabi, Waine and Judah Rimbu, trained with the Dolphins side during NRL pre-season in January 2023. Waine then left to join the London Broncos, while Tai was recalled together with Morea Morea in April to be part of the Dolphins for a month to train. Tai's trial was extended after that one month, while Morea returned to the Hunters in May.

== Season summary ==
=== Milestone games ===
Round	Player	Milestone
Round 1	Morea Morea (#112), Siki Konden (#113), Sakias Komati (#114), Tom Moide (#115), Joshua Mire (#116), Valentine Richard (#117)	Hostplus Cup debuts
Round 1	Samson Komati	scored his first try
Round 2	Morea Morea	scored his first Hunters try
Round 3	Sanny Wabo (#118)	Hostplus Cup debut
Round 5	Junior Igila (#119), Trevor Solu (#120), Koso Badi (#121)	Hostplus Cup debuts
Round 8	Tom Moide	scored his first Hostplus Cup try
Round 8	Seal Kalo (Hunters #122)	Hostplus Cup debut
Round 10	Sanny Wabo	scored his first Hostplus Cup try
Round 11	Jamie Mavoko	scored his first Hostplus Cup try
Round 12	Junior Igila	scored his first Hostplus Cup try
Round 13	Joshua Lau (Hunters #123)	scored his first try on his Debut
Round 14	Joshua Mire	scored his first try at Hostplus cup level
Round 15	Trevor Solu	scored his first try at Hostplus cup level
Round 16	Whallen Tau-Loi (PNG Hunters #124)	Hostplus Cup debut
Round 20	Whallen Tau-Loi	First Hostplus Cup try
Round 22	Siki Konden	First Hostplus Cup try

== 2023 squad ==
PNG Hunters
First team squad			Coaching staff
Morea Morea – FB; Siki Konden – WG; Brandon Nima – CE, WG (vc); Rodrick Tai – CE, WG; Solo Wane – WG; Joshua Lau – SO, CE, WG; Jamie Mavoko – HB; Junior Rop – PR, LK; Judah Rimbu – HK, HB; Epel Kapinias – PR, SR; Benji Kot – SR, CE; Whallen Tau-Loi – SR; Ila Alu – LK (c)	Warren Glare – HK; Seal Kalo – PR; Casey Dickson – PR; Valentine Richard – PR (On Loan); Tom Moide – LK, PR; Sanny Wabo – FB; Sakias Komati – SO; Henry Wan – PR; Junior Igila – CE; Trevor Solu – HK; Philemon Kimisive – SR; Joshua Mire – SO, HB; Sherwin Tanabi – SR	Koso Badi – PR, SR; Mathew Jesse – WG, FB; Wesser Tenza – HK; Julius Yakopa – SR, LK	Head coach: Stanley Tepend; Assistant coach: Paul Aiton; Legend: (c) Captain(s); (vc) Vice-captain(s); Updated: 03 February 2023; Source(s):

== Squad movement ==
=== Gains ===
Player	Signed from	Until end of	Notes
Epel Kapinias	Wynnum Manly Seagulls	2023	

=== Losses ===
Player	Signed to	Until end of	Notes
Keven Appo	Bradford Bulls	2023	
Sylvester Namo	North Queensland Cowboys	2023	
Kitron Laka	Wynnum Manly Seagulls	2023	
Kingstimer Paraia	Souths Logan Magpies	2023	
Samuel Yegip	Central Queensland Capras	2023	
Emmanuel Waine	London Broncos	2023	
Wartovo Puara	Sepik Pride	2023	
Liam Joseph	Rabaul Gurias	2023	
Dilbert Isaac	Redcliffe Dolphins	2023	
Gilmo Paul	Port Moresby Vipers	2023	

== Ladder ==
Pos	Team	Pld	W	D	L	B	PF	PA	PD	Pts
1	Burleigh Bears	20	15	1	4	2	547	376	171	35
2	Souths Logan Magpies	20	14	2	4	2	588	392	196	34
3	Brisbane Tigers	20	14	1	5	2	573	432	141	33
4	Central Queensland Capras	20	12	2	6	2	511	387	124	30
5	Redcliffe Dolphins	20	11	3	6	2	564	443	121	29
6	Wynnum Manly Seagulls	20	12	0	8	2	610	498	112	28
7	Northern Pride RLFC	20	11	2	7	2	363	442	-79	28
8	Sunshine Coast Falcons	20	11	1	8	2	525	408	117	27
9	Tweed Heads Seagulls	20	11	0	9	2	614	478	136	26
10	Papua New Guinea Hunters	20	9	1	10	2	464	514	-50	23
11	Norths Devils	20	8	2	10	2	551	530	21	22
12	Townsville Blackhawks	20	8	1	11	2	480	455	25	21
13	Western Clydesdales	20	3	0	17	2	452	684	-232	10
14	Mackay Cutters	20	3	0	16	2	332	606	-274	10
15	Ipswich Jets	20	0	0	20	2	342	871	-529	4

- The team highlighted in blue clinched the minor premiership.
- Teams highlighted in green qualified for the finals.
- The team highlighted in red clinched the wooden spoon.

== Fixtures ==
=== Pre-season ===
Date	Round	Opponent	Venue	Score	Tries	Goals
Saturday 25 February	Trial 1	CQ Capras	PNG Football Stadium	12-20	Konden, Morea, Kot	
Saturday 4 March	Trial 2	Kaiviti Silktails	Lawaqa Park, Sigatoka, Fiji	26-12	Rop 3, Konden, Nima	
Legend: Win Loss Draw Bye

=== Regular season ===
Date	Round	Opponent	Venue	Score	Tries	Goals	Attendance
Sunday, 12 March	Round 1	Western Clydesdales	Clive Berghofer Stadium	20-10	Nima 2, Komati, Kot	Mavoko 2/4 goals	
Saturday, 18 March	Round 2	Souths Logan Magpies	Logan Metro Sports Park	22-22	Komati 2, Tai, Kot, Morea	Morea 1/5 goal	
Saturday, 25 March	Round 3	Brisbane Tigers	PNG Football Stadium	36-38	Morea 3, Wane, Nima, Alu, Yakopa	Morea 3/6, Komati 1/1 goals	
Saturday, 8 April	Round 4	BYE	-				
Saturday, 15 April	Round 5	Northern Pride	Barlow Park	14-34	Tai, Komati, Nima	Solu 1/3 goal	
Saturday, 22 April	Round 6	Burleigh Bears	Pizzey Park	20-46	Rop, Kapinias, Nima, Komati	Morea 1/2, Solu 1/2 goals	
Saturday, 29 April	Round 7	Mackay Cutters	PNG Football Stadium	18-10	Morea, Kot, Yakopa, Tai	Mavoko 1/4	
Saturday, 6 May	Round 8	Ipswich Jets	PNG Football Stadium	40-28	Nima 2, Morea, Tenza, Moide, Komati, Rop	Mavoko 6/7	
Friday, 12 May	Round 9	Townsville Blackhawks	Jack Manski Oval	4-54	Wane	Mavoko 0/1	
Saturday, 20 May	Round 10	Wynnum Manly Seagulls	BMD Kougari Oval	24-28	Tai 2, Wabo 2, Jesse	Mavoko 2/5	
Saturday,27 May	Round 11	Northern Pride	PNG Football Stadium	16-22	Yakopa, Mavoko, Tenza	Mavoko 2/3	
Saturday, 3 June	Round 12	Tweed Heads Seagulls	PNG Football Stadium	34-18	Moide, Igila, Morea, Tai, Wane, Rop	Mavoko 5/6	
Saturday, 10 June	Round 13	Western Clydesdales	PNG Football Stadium	40-4	Moide, Nima, Lau, Kimisive, Wabo, Morea, Tai	Solu 5/6, Morea 1/1	
Saturday, 17 June	Round 14	Souths Logan Magpies	PNG Football Stadium	10-40	Kot, Mire	Solu 1/1, Mavoko 0/1	
Sunday, 25 June	Round 15	Sunshine Coast Falcons	Sunshine Coast Stadium	34-10	Solu 2, Morea, Moide, Yakopa, Wane	Mavoko 4/5, Solu 1/1	
Saturday, 1 July	Round 16	CQ Capras	PNG Football Stadium	14-8	Rimbu, Wabo, Kot	Mavoko 1/2 Solu 0/1	
Saturday, 8 July	Round 17	Burleigh Bears	PNG Football Stadium	22-30	Nima, Kot, Morea, Wane	Morea (2/4 + 1 pen.)	
Saturday, 15 July	Round 18	BYE					
Sunday, 30 July	Round 19	Brisbane Tigers	Totally Workwear Stadium	18-32	Tai, Wane, Kot	Mavoko 3/3	
Saturday, 5 August	Round 20	Redcliffe Dolphins	PNG Football Stadium	26-22	Wane 2, Tau-Loi, Lau, Kot	Mavoko (2/5 + 1 pen.)	
Saturday, 12 August	Round 21	Townsville Blackhawks	PNG Football Stadium	22-18	Morea, Lau, Tau-Loi, Mavoko	Mavoko 3/4	
Saturday, 19 August	Round 22	Norths Devils	Bishop Park	30-40	Rop, Mavoko, Komati, Rimbu, Konden	Mavoko (4/5 + 1 pen.)	
Legend: Win Loss Draw Bye

== Statistics ==
*	Denotes player on loan from the Central Queensland Capras.

Name	App	T	G	FG	Pts
Ila Alu	18	1	-	-	4
Koso Badi	7	0	-	-	0
Casey Dickson	7	0	-	-	0
Warren Glare	4	0	-	-	0
Junior Igila	7	1	-	-	4
Mathew Jesse	2	1	-	-	4
Seal Kalo	10	0	-	-	0
Epel Kapinias	20	1	-	-	4
Philemon Kimisive	2	1	-	-	4
Sakias Komati	13	7	1	-	30
Siki Konden	6	1	-	-	4
Benji Kot	16	8	-	-	32
Joshua Lau	5	3	-	-	12
Jamie Mavoko	18	3	37	-	86
Joshua Mire	6	1	-	-	4
Tom Moide	16	4	-	-	16
Morea Morea	20	11	9	-	62
Brandon Nima	19	9	-	-	36
Valentine Richard	4	0	-	-	0
Judah Rimbu	18	2	-	-	8
Junior Rop	18	4	-	-	16
Trevor Solu	8	2	8	-	24
Rodrick Tai	19	8	-	-	32
Sherwin Tanabi	7	0	-	-	0
Whallen Tau-Loi	5	2	-	-	8
Wesser Tenza	11	2	-	-	8
Sanny Wabo	8	4	-	-	16
Henry Wan	12	0	-	-	0
Solo Wane	20	8	-	-	32
Julius Yakopa	11	4	-	-	16
Totals		88	56	0	464

== Representatives ==
The following players played representative matches in 2023.

	PNG Prime Minister's XIII	2023 Pacific Rugby League Championships
Seal Kalo	PNG Prime Minister's XIII	
Epel Kapinias	PNG Prime Minister's XIII	PNG Kumuls
Benji Kot	PNG Prime Minister's XIII	PNG Kumuls
Tommy Moide	PNG Prime Minister's XIII	
Morea Morea	PNG Prime Minister's XIII	
Judah Rimbu	PNG Prime Minister's XIII	PNG Kumuls
Junior Rop	PNG Prime Minister's XIII	PNG Kumuls
Rodrick Tai	PNG Prime Minister's XIII	PNG Kumuls
