= 2021 Papua New Guinea Hunters season =

- Queensland Cup Rank: 10th
- 2021 record: Wins: 6; losses: 11
- Points scored: For: 386; against: 479

Team information
- CEO: Scott Barker
- Coach: Mathew Church
- Captain: Ila Alu
- Stadium: Bycroft Oval, Gold Coast

Top scorers
- Tries: 9 (Junior Rau, Solo Wane)
- Goals: 21 (Charlie Simon, Ase Boas)
- Points: 46 (Charlie Simon, Ase Boas)
← 2020	2022 →

The Papua New Guinea Hunters is a professional rugby league club from Papua New Guinea that participates in the Queensland Cup in Australia. They have relocated to Runaway Bay, Gold Coast for the 2021 Intrust Super Cup Season. The 2021 Intrust Super Cup will be the PNG Hunters' eighth season in rugby league's Queensland Cup after securing their future with a four-year license from 2019 until 2022. A 37-man train-on squad was announced for the pre season before it was trimmed and the final squad finalized. Doncaster RLFC agreed for Watson Boas to play with the Hunters squad until he was able to return to the United Kingdom. In partnership with PacificAus Sports( Australian Department of Foreign Affairs and Trade), Papua New Guinea Rugby Football League, PNG Hunters and QRL signed a three year agreement titled 'Growing and Supporting Rugby League in Papua New Guinea' in February which will see the PacificAus Sports and QRL assisting to develop the sport in the country by creating pathways for emerging PNG players and also develop pathways for PNG teams like the PNG Hunters Under-19s and Papua New Guinea Hunters women's to take part in high-level Australian sporting competitions The Hunters travelled with a 24-man squad to Queensland after six could not travel due to visa issues. Three consultants were recruited to join the coaching team in order to refine and up-skill the coaching staff through funding by PacificAus sports program.

== Season summary ==
- Round 1: Jokadi Bire scored his first try for the club.
- Round 2: Edwin Ipape and Epel Kapinias scored their first tries for the club.
- Round 3: Samuel Yegip and Sylvester Namo scored their first tries for the club.
- Round 4: Norman Brown and Benji Kot scored their first tries for the club.
- Round 4: Wartovo Puara played his 115th game for the Hunters equaling the most capped player record with Adex Wera for the club.
- Round 6: Wartovo Puara played his 116th game for the Hunters becoming the most capped player in the history of the club
- Round 7: Solo Wane and Emmanuel Waine scored their first tries for the club.
- Round 14: Enoch Maki played his 95th game for the club overtaking Willie Minoga who played 94 games for the club.
- Round 16: Ase Boas played his 116th game for the club overtaking Adex Wera who played 115 games. Ase is now second most capped Hunter.
- Round 16: Judah Rimbu scored his first try for the club.
- Round 17: Gilmo Paul scored his first try for the club.

=== Milestone games ===
Round	Player	Milestone
Round 1	Jokadi Bire, Samuel Yegip, Edwin Ipape, Benji Kot, Emmanuel Waine, Sylvester Namo and Judah Rimbu	ISC debut
Round 4	Norman Brown	ISC debut
Round 5	Jeffrey Robert	ISC debut
Round 6	Tom Butterfield	Hunters debut
Round 7	Solo Wane	ISC debut
Round 8	Solomon Pokare	ISC debut
Round 12	Junior Rau	50th Game
Round 19	Gilmo Paul	ISC Debut (Hunter #98)
Round 17	Enoch Maki	100th Game

== 2021 squad ==
PNG Hunters
First team squad			Coaching staff
Terry Wapi – FB; Junior Rau – WG; Brandon Nima – CE; Brendon Gotuno – CE, WG; Solo Wane – WG; Ase Boas – SO, HB; Charlie Simon – HB, SO; Stanton Albert – PR; Wartovo Puara – HK; Enoch Maki – PR; Benji Kot – SR, CE; Keven Appo – SR (vc); Ila Alu – LK (c)	Edwin Ipape – HK, SO, FB; Emmanuel Waine – SR, CE; Epel Kapinias – SR, PR; Judah Rimbu – HK, SO; Dilbert Isaac – PR, LK; Samuel Yegip – PR; Norman Brown – FB, WG; Jordan Pat – PR; Mark Piti – PR; Sylvester Namo – SR; Jeffrey Robert – SR; Joe Joshua – FB, CE; Solomon Pokare – HB	Gilmo Paul – CE; Jokadi Bire – CE	Head coach: Mathew Church; Assistant coaches: Paul Aiton; Ben Cross- Specialist Coach; Legend: (c) Captain(s); (vc) Vice-captain(s); Updated: 13 January 2021; Source(s):

== Squad movement ==
=== Gains ===
Player	Signed from	Until end of	Notes
Solomon Pokare	Hela Wigmen	2021	
Judah Rimbu	Hela Wigmen	2021	
Jokadi Bire	Lae Snax Tigers	2021	
Benji Kot	Kimbe Cutters	2021	
Samuel Yegip	Hela Wigmen	2021	
Jeffrey Robert	Hela Wigmen	2021	
Sylvester Namo	Lae Snax Tigers	2021	
Edwin Ipape	Lae Snax Tigers	2021	
Norman Brown	Hela Wigmen	2021	
Gilmo Paul	Hela Wigmen	2021	
Solo Wane	Hela Wigmen	2021	
Watson Boas	Doncaster RLFC (loan)	2021	
Wartovo Puara	Barrow Raiders	2021	

=== Losses ===
Player	Signed To	Until end of	Notes
Shane Nigel	Port Moresby Vipers	2021	
Joe Frank	Waghi Tumbe	2021	
Patrick Morea	Hela Wigmen	2021	
Rhadley Brawa	Enga Mioks	2021	
Junior Rop	Lae Snax Tigers	2021	
Steven Bruno	Rabaul Gurias	2021	
Justin Yoka	Kimbe Cutters	2021	
Nicky Oliver	Central Dabaris	2021	
Francis Takai	Rabaul Gurias	2021	
Roy Elison	Rabaul Gurias	2021	
Casey Dickson	Lae Snax Tigers	2021	
Stanley Olo	Lae Snax Tigers	2021	

== Ladder ==
Pos	Team	Pld	W	D	L	B	PF	PA	PD	Pts
1	Norths Devils	17	15	0	2	0	521	320	201	30
2	Wynnum Manly Seagulls	17	12	0	5	0	513	374	139	24
3	Burleigh Bears	17	12	0	5	0	457	342	115	24
4	Tweed Heads Seagulls	17	10	2	5	0	458	384	74	22
5	Redcliffe Dolphins	17	11	0	6	0	450	397	53	22
6	Souths Logan Magpies	17	10	1	6	0	517	446	71	21
7	Townsville Blackhawks	17	9	1	7	0	468	361	107	19
8	Sunshine Coast Falcons	17	9	0	8	0	448	390	58	18
9	Northern Pride	17	9	0	8	0	376	387	-11	18
10	Papua New Guinea Hunters	17	6	0	11	0	386	479	-93	12
11	Brisbane Tigers	17	4	1	12	0	364	456	-92	9
12	Mackay Cutters	17	4	0	13	0	330	556	-226	8
13	Ipswich Jets	17	3	1	13	0	365	561	-196	7
14	Central Queensland Capras	17	1	2	14	0	303	503	-200	4

- The team highlighted in blue has clinched the minor premiership
- Teams highlighted in green have qualified for the finals
- The team highlighted in red has clinched the wooden spoon

== Fixtures ==
=== Pre-season ===
Date	Round	Opponent	Venue	Score	Tries	Goals

=== Regular season ===
Date	Round	Opponent	Venue	Score	Tries	Goals	Attendance
Saturday, 20 March	Round 1	Wynnum Manly Seagulls	Bycroft Oval, Gold Coast	18-20	Bire, Wapi, Puara	Simon 3 goals	
Saturday, 27 March	Round 2	Ipswich Jets	Bycroft Oval, Gold Coast	44-22	Gotuno 3, Kapinias 2, Wapi, Bire, Ipape	Simon 6 goals	
Saturday, 10 April	Round 3	Mackay Cutters	BB Print Stadium	26-14	Yegip, Namo, Rau, W.Boas, Ipape	Simon 3 goals	
Saturday, 17 April	Round 4	Sunshine Coast Falcons	Bycroft Oval, Gold Coast	32-12	Kot 2, Brown 2, Wapi, Yegip	Simon 4 goals	
Saturday, 24 April	Round 5	Burleigh Bears	Pizzey Park	18-25	Bire, Brown, Nima, Wapi	Simon goal	
Sunday, 9 May	Round 6	Brisbane Tigers	Bycroft Oval, Gold Coast	12-40	Bire, Brown	Simon 2 goals	
Sunday, 16 May	Round 7	Souths Logan Magpies	Davies Park	14-48	Waine, Wane, Bire	Pokare goal	
Saturday, 29 May	Round 8	Redcliffe Dolphins	Moreton Daily Stadium	12-24	Rau 2, Kot		
Saturday, 5 June	Round 9	Townsville Blackhawks	Bycroft Oval, Gold Coast	28-38	Bire 2, Appo 2, Nima, Kot	Ase Boas 2 goals	
Saturday, 12 June	Round 10	Norths Devils	Bishop Park	22-38	Wane, Kot, Bire, Appo	Ase Boas 3 goals	
Sunday, 20 June	Round 11	Burleigh Bears	Cbus Super Stadium	6-40	Rau	Ase Boas goal	
Saturday, 10 July	Round 13	Sunshine Coast Falcons	Sunshine Coast Stadium	12-26	Kot 2	Ase Boas 2 goals	
Saturday, 17 July	Round 14	Northern Pride	Atherton Stadium, Artheton	34-22	Wane 3, Nima, Rau, Simon	Ase Boas 4, Simon goals	
Saturday, 24 July	Round 12	Mackay Cutters	Bycroft Oval, Gold Coast	30-40	Rau 3, Gotuno 2, Wane	Ase Boas 3 goals	
Saturday, 31 July	Round 15	Wynnum Manly Seagulls	Eskdale Park, Maryborough		Round 15 cancelled		
Saturday, 21 August	Round 18	Brisbane Tigers	Totally Workwear Stadium		Round 18 cancelled		
Sunday, 29 August	Round 19	Souths Logan Magpies	Bycroft Oval, Gold Coast	26-32	Wapi 2, Puara, Yegip, Waine	Ase Boas 3 goals	
Saturday, 4 Sept.	Round 16	CQ Capras	Browne Park	22-20	Wane 2, Rimbu, Rau, Ipape	Simon goal	
Saturday, 11 Sept.	Round 17	Tweed Heads Seagulls	Bycroft Oval, Gold Coast	30-18	Waine 2, Gilmo, Kapinias, Wane, Ase Boas	Ase Boas 3 goals	
Legend: Win Loss Draw Bye

== Statistics ==
*	Denotes player contracted to the Doncaster RLFC for the 2021 season

Name	App	T	G	FG	Pts
Stanton Albert	11	-	-	-	-
Ila Alu	15	-	-	-	-
Kevin Appo	10	3	-	-	12
Jokadi Bire	10	8	-	-	32
Ase Boas	9	1	21	-	46
Watson Boas*	5	1	-	-	4
Norman Brown	8	4	-	-	16
Tommy Butterfield	2	-	-	-	-
Brendon Gotuno	6	5	-	-	20
Edwin Ipape	11	3	-	-	12
Dilbert Isaac	4	-	-	-	-
Joe Joshua	2	-	-	-	-
Epel Kapinias	10	3	-	-	12
Benji Kot	15	7	-	-	28
Enoch Maki	10	-	-	-	0
Sylvester Namo	13	1	-	-	4
Brandon Nima	15	3	-	-	12
Jordan Pat	3	-	-	-	-
Gilmo Paul	3	1	-	-	4
Mark Piti	7	-	-	-	-
Solomon Pokare	3	-	1	-	2
Wartovo Puara	16	2	-	-	8
Junior Rau	16	9	-	-	36
Judah Rimbu	15	1	-	-	4
Jeffrey Robert	1	-	-	-	-
Charlie Simon	14	1	21	-	46
Emmanuel Waine	16	4	-	-	16
Solo Wane	9	9	-	-	36
Terry Wapi	11	6	-	-	24
Samuel Yegip	15	2	-	-	8
Totals		74	43	0	386
