= 2021 Men's Rugby League World Cup Group D =

Group D of the 2021 Rugby League World Cup is one of the four groups in the 2021 Rugby League World Cup, which will be played in 2022. The group comprises automatic qualifiers Tonga and Papua New Guinea as well as Wales, who qualified through the 2018 European Championship and Cook Islands, who qualified through the repechage tournament.

The pool draw was made on 16 January 2020. The fixtures were announced on 21 July 2020. A revised schedule was issued on 19 November 2021 following the postponement of the tournament from 2021 to 2022.

== Standings ==
Pos	Team	Pld	W	D	L	PF	PA	PD	Pts	Qualification
1	Tonga	3	3	0	0	148	34	+114	6	Advance to knockout stage
2	Papua New Guinea	3	2	0	1	86	40	+46	4	Advance to knockout stage
3	Cook Islands	3	1	0	2	44	136	−92	2	
4	Wales	3	0	0	3	18	86	−68	0	

Source: rlwc2021

== Matches ==
=== Tonga vs Papua New Guinea ===
18 October 2022
19:30 BST (UTC+01:00)

Tonga	24–18	Papua New Guinea
Tries: Penisini 14'; Fotuaika 35'; I. Katoa 37'; Koloamatangi 78'; Goals: I. Katoa (4/5) 16', 36', 39', 79'	Report	Tries: Martin 6'; Lam 41'; Russell 68'; Goals: Martin (3/3) 7', 43', 69'

Totally Wicked Stadium, St Helens
Attendance: 10,409
Referee: Liam Moore (England)
Touch judges: James Child (England), Belinda Sharpe (Australia)
Player of the Match: Edwin Ipape (Papua New Guinea)

Team details
Tonga		Position	Papua New Guinea
Name	Number	Position	Number	Name
Tolutau Koula	20	Fullback	1	Alex Johnston
Daniel Tupou	2	Wing	20	Rodrick Tai
Mosese Suli	19	Centre	3	Nene MacDonald
Will Penisini	4	Centre	4	Justin Olam
Sione Katoa	5	Wing	15	Dan Russell
Isaiya Katoa	24	Stand off/Five eighth	6	Kyle Laybutt
Tuimoala Lolohea	7	Scrum half/Half back	7	Lachlan Lam
Addin Fonua-Blake	8	Prop forward	8	Wellington Albert
Keaon Koloamatangi	12	Hooker	9	Edwin Ipape
Tevita Tatola	16	Prop forward	10	Sylvester Namo
Felise Kaufusi	11	Second row	11	Nixon Putt
Haumole Olakau'atu	15	Second row	12	Rhyse Martin
Siosiua Taukeiaho	10	Loose forward/Lock forward	13	Jacob Alick
Soni Luke	14	Interchange	23	Watson Boas
Moeaki Fotuaika	17	Interchange	16	McKenzie Yei
David Fifita	18	Interchange	17	Emmanuel Waine
Siosifa Talakai	3	Interchange	18	Keven Appo
Kristian Woolf		Coach		Stanley Tepend
Rugby League Project

=== Wales vs Cook Islands ===
19 October 2022
19:30 BST (UTC+01:00)

Wales	12–18	Cook Islands
Tries: Lloyd 13'; Olds 27'; Goals: Fozard (2/2) 15', 29'	Report	Tries: Gelling 22'; Moale 59'; S. Marsters 64'; Goals: S. Marsters (3/4) 24', 40' pen, 61'

Leigh Sports Village, Leigh
Attendance: 6,188
Referee: Robert Hicks (England)
Touch judges: Rochelle Tamarua (New Zealand), Todd Smith (Australia)
Player of the Match: Johnathon Ford (Cook Islands)

Team details
Wales		Position	Cook Islands
Name	Number	Position	Number	Name
Caleb Aekins	1	Fullback	1	Kayal Iro
Mike Butt	19	Wing	2	Steven Marsters
Will Evans	4	Centre	3	Anthony Gelling
Elliot Kear	6	Centre	4	Reubenn Rennie
Rhys Williams	2	Wing	5	Paul Ulberg
Ollie Olds	14	Stand off/Five eighth	6	Esan Marsters
Josh Ralph	7	Scrum half/Half back	7	Johnathon Ford
Anthony Walker	8	Prop forward	8	Pride Petterson-Robati
Matty Fozard	9	Hooker	9	Aaron Teroi
Dan Fleming	10	Prop forward	10	Tepai Moeroa
Rhodri Lloyd	11	Second row	11	Dominique Peyroux
Bailey Antrobus	17	Second row	12	Reuben Porter
Joe Burke	16	Loose forward/Lock forward	13	Zane Tetevano
Chester Butler	12	Interchange	14	Makahesi Makatoa
Ben Evans	13	Interchange	15	Davvy Moale
Curtis Davies	15	Interchange	16	Rua Ngatikaura
Connor Davies	18	Interchange	17	Brad Takairangi
John Kear		Coach		Tony Iro
Rugby League Project

=== Tonga vs Wales ===
24 October 2022
19:30 BST (UTC+01:00)

Tonga	32–6	Wales
Tries: Tupou (3) 21', 51', 71'; Fifita 37'; Koloamatangi 40'; Niu 47'; Goals: Lolohea (3/5) 38', 40', 49'; Talakai (1/1) 72'	Report	Tries: Evans 17'; Goals: Fozard (1/1) 18'

Totally Wicked Stadium, St Helens
Attendance: 7,752
Referee: Kasey Badger (Australia)
Touch judges: Mike Smaill (England), Rochelle Tamarua (New Zealand)
Player of the Match: Daniel Tupou (Tonga)

Team details
Tonga		Position	Wales
Name	Number	Position	Number	Name
	1	Fullback	1
	2	Wing	2
	3	Centre	3
	4	Centre	4
	5	Wing	5
	6	Stand off/Five eighth	6
	7	Scrum half/Half back	7
	8	Prop forward	8
	9	Hooker	9
	10	Prop forward	10
	11	Second row	11
	12	Second row	12
	13	Loose forward/Lock forward	13
		Interchange
		Interchange
		Interchange
		Interchange
Rugby League Project

=== Papua New Guinea vs Cook Islands ===
25 October 2022
19:30 BST (UTC+01:00)

Papua New Guinea	32–16	Cook Islands
Tries: Tai (2) 14', 46'; Laybutt 23'; Martin 41'; Lam 56'; Olam 68'; Goals: Martin (4/6) 24', 42', 57', 69'	Report	Tries: Ulberg 34'; Gelling 60'; Iro 77'; Goals: S. Marsters (2/3) 3' pen, 35'; Takairangi (0/1)

Halliwell Jones Stadium, Warrington
Attendance: 6,273
Referee: Chris Kendall (England)
Touch judges: Wyatt Raymond (Australia), Paki Parkinson (New Zealand)
Player of the Match: Rhyse Martin (Papua New Guinea)

Team details
Papua New Guinea		Position	Cook Islands
Name	Number	Position	Number	Name
Alex Johnston	1	Fullback	1	Kayal Iro
Rodrick Tai	20	Wing	5	Steven Marsters
Nene Macdonald	3	Centre	3	Anthony Gelling
Justin Olam	4	Centre	16	Reubenn Rennie
Jimmy Ngutlik	19	Wing	2	Paul Ulberg
Kyle Laybutt	6	Stand off/Five eighth	6	Brad Takairangi
Lam	7	Scrum half/Half back	4	Esan Marsters
Wellington Albert	8	Prop forward	21	Vincent Rennie
Edwin Ipape	9	Hooker	9	Aaron Teroi
Sylvester Namo	10	Prop forward	10	Tepai Moeroa
Nixon Putt	11	Second row	11	Dominique Peyroux
Rhyse Martin	12	Second row	12	Brendan Piakura
Jacob Alick	13	Loose forward/Lock forward	13	Zane Tetevano
Watson Boas	23	Interchange	8	Makahesi Makatoa
Dan Russell	15	Interchange	20	Davvy Moale
McKenzie Yei	16	Interchange	17	Rua Ngatikaura
Keven Appo	18	Interchange	18	Moses Noovao-McGreal
Jeremiah Simbiken	22	Concussion substitute	14	Tevin Arona
Rugby League Project

=== Tonga vs Cook Islands ===
30 October 2022
14:30 GMT (UTC±00:00)

Tonga	92–10	Cook Islands
Tries: Tupou (2) 1', 64'; Taumalolo (2) 13', 20'; Niu (3) 22', 29', 49'; Penisini (4) 26', 32' (pen), 61', 74'; Lolohea (2) 35', 58'; Kaufusi 40'; I. Katoa 44'; Amone 78'; Goals: I. Katoa (14/16) 15', 21', 24', 28', 31', 33', 37', 40', 46', 51', 62', 66', 76', 79'	Report	Tries: S. Marsters 69'; Ti. Arona 80'; Goals: S. Marsters (0/1); Ti. Arona (1/1) 80'

Riverside Stadium, Middlesbrough
Attendance: 8,342
Referee: Ashley Klein (Australia)
Touch judges: Kasey Badger (Australia), Aaron Moore (England)
Player of the Match: Jason Taumalolo (Tonga)

Team details
Tonga		Position	Cook Islands
Name	Number	Position	Number	Name
Tesi Niu	22	Fullback	1	Kayal Iro
Daniel Tupou	2	Wing	5	Steven Marsters
Mosese Suli	19	Centre	4	Esan Marsters
Will Penisini	4	Centre	22	Geoff Daniela
Sione Katoa	5	Wing	2	Paul Ulberg
Isaiya Katoa	24	Stand off/Five eighth	6	Brad Takairangi
Tuimoala Lolohea	7	Scrum half/Half back	7	Johnathon Ford
Addin Fonua-Blake	8	Prop forward	8	Makahesi Makatoa
Soni Luke	14	Hooker	9	Aaron Teroi
Moeaki Fotuaika	17	Prop forward	10	Tepai Moeroa
Felise Kaufusi	11	Second row	11	Dominique Peyroux
Keaon Koloamatangi	12	Second row	12	Brendan Piakura
Jason Taumalolo	13	Loose forward/Lock forward	13	Zane Tetevano
Talatau Amone	6	Interchange	14	Tevin Arona
Tevita Tatola	16	Interchange	15	Tinirau Arona
David Fifita	18	Interchange	20	Davvy Moale
Ben Murdoch-Masila	21	Interchange	24	Dylan Napa
Konrad Hurrell	23	Concussion substitute	19	Pride Petterson-Robati
Rugby League Project

=== Papua New Guinea vs Wales ===
31 October 2022
19:30 GMT (UTC±00:00)

Papua New Guinea	36–0	Wales
Tries: Laybutt 6'; Putt (2) 12', 46'; Ngutlik (2) 18', 76'; Russell 23'; Goals: Martin (6/6) 6', 12', 18', 23', 46', 77'	Report

Eco-Power Stadium, Doncaster
Attendance: 6,968
Referee: Gerard Sutton (Australia)
Touch judges: Belinda Sharpe (Australia), James Child (England)
Player of the Match: Nixon Putt (Papua New Guinea)

Team details
Papua New Guinea		Position	Wales
Name	Number	Position	Number	Name
Alex Johnston	1	Fullback	1	Caleb Aekins
Rodrick Tai	20	Wing	2	Kyle Evans
Nene Macdonald	3	Centre	3	Will Evans
Justin Olam	4	Centre	4	Elliot Kear
Jimmy Ngutlik	19	Wing	5	Rhys Williams
Kyle Laybutt	6	Stand off/Five eighth	6	Ollie Olds
Lachlan Lam	7	Scrum half/Half back	7	Josh Ralph
Wellington Albert	8	Prop forward	8	Anthony Walker
Edwin Ipape	9	Hooker	9	Matty Fozard
Emmanuel Waine	17	Prop forward	24	Gavin Bennion
Nixon Putt	11	Second row	11	Rhodri Lloyd
Rhyse Martin	12	Second row	17	Bailey Antrobus
Jacob Alick	13	Loose forward/Lock forward	16	Joe Burke
Wesser Tenza	14	Interchange	10	Dan Fleming
Dan Russell	15	Interchange	12	Chester Butler
Sherwin Tanabi	21	Interchange	15	Curtis Davies
Jeremiah Simbiken	22	Interchange	18	Connor Davies
Zev John	24	Concussion substitute	19	Mike Butt
Stanley Tepend		Coach		John Kear
Rugby League Project
