= 2020 Papua New Guinea Hunters season =

- Queensland Cup Rank: 6th
- 2020 record: Wins: 1; losses: 0

Team information
- CEO: Reatau Rau
- Coach: Mathew Church
- Captain: Ase Boas
- Stadium: National Football Stadium

Top scorers
- Tries: 3 (Terry Wapi)
- Goals: 6 (Ase Boas)
- Points: 12 (Wapi, Boas)
| ← 2019 | 2021 → |

The 2020 Intrust Super Cup was the PNG Hunters seventh season in the Queensland Cup after securing their future with a four year license from 2019 until 2022. A 28 man squad was announced for the season. However the 2020 QRL season was suspended on 17 March after Round 1 due to the Covid-19 pandemic.

== 2020 squad ==
PNG Hunters
| First team squad | | | Coaching staff |
|---|---|---|---|
| Terry Wapi – FB; Junior Rau – WG; Joe Joshua – FB, CE; Brandon Nima – CE; Brendon Gotuno – WG; Charlie Simon – SO; Ase Boas – HB (c); Enoch Maki – PR; Nicky Hasu – HK; Junior Rop – PR; Epel Kapinias – SR; Kevin Appo – SR; Ila Alu – LK (vc) | Stanley Olo – HK; Mark Piti – PR; Rhadley Brawa – LK; Stanton Albert – PR; Emmanuel Waine – CE; Joe Frank – WG; Justin Yoka – HB; Francis Takai – SR; Patrick Morea – HK; Shane Nigel – CE; Smith Siviri – CE; Casey Dickson – SR; Steven Bruno – SR | Gairo Kapana – WG; Roy Ellison – WG; Baundo Aba – LK | Head coach: Mathew Church; Assistant coach: Glen Nami; Legend: (c) Captain(s); (vc) Vice-captain(s); Updated: 3 January 2020; Source(s): |

== Squad movement ==
=== Gains ===
| Player | Signed From | Until End of | Notes |
|---|---|---|---|
| Rhadley Brawa | Wynnum Manly Seagulls | 2020 | |

=== Losses ===
| Player | Signed To | Until End of | Notes |
|---|---|---|---|
| Moses Meninga | Townsville Blackhawks | 2020 | |
| McKenzie Yei | Central Queensland Capras | 2020 | |

== Ladder ==
| Pos | Team | Pld | W | D | L | B | PF | PA | PD | Pts |
|---|---|---|---|---|---|---|---|---|---|---|
| 1 | Easts Tigers | 1 | 1 | 0 | 0 | 0 | 44 | 4 | 40 | 2 |
| 2 | Burleigh Bears | 1 | 1 | 0 | 0 | 0 | 34 | 6 | 28 | 2 |
| 3 | Tweed Heads Seagulls | 1 | 1 | 0 | 0 | 0 | 16 | 10 | 6 | 2 |
| 4 | Townsville Blackhawks | 1 | 1 | 0 | 0 | 0 | 16 | 10 | 6 | 2 |
| 5 | Redcliffe Dolphins | 1 | 1 | 0 | 0 | 0 | 22 | 16 | 6 | 2 |
| 6 | Papua New Guinea Hunters | 1 | 1 | 0 | 0 | 0 | 32 | 30 | 2 | 2 |
| 7 | Norths Devils | 1 | 1 | 0 | 0 | 0 | 23 | 22 | 1 | 2 |
| 8 | Mackay Cutters | 1 | 0 | 0 | 1 | 0 | 22 | 23 | -1 | 0 |
| 9 | Souths Logan Magpies | 1 | 0 | 0 | 1 | 0 | 30 | 32 | -2 | 0 |
| 10 | Sunshine Coast Falcons | 1 | 0 | 0 | 1 | 0 | 16 | 22 | -6 | 0 |
| 11 | Northern Pride | 1 | 0 | 0 | 1 | 0 | 10 | 16 | -6 | 0 |
| 12 | Ipswich Jets | 1 | 0 | 0 | 1 | 0 | 10 | 16 | -6 | 0 |
| 13 | Wynnum Manly Seagulls | 1 | 0 | 0 | 1 | 0 | 6 | 34 | -28 | 0 |
| 14 | Central Queensland Capras | 1 | 0 | 0 | 1 | 0 | 4 | 44 | -40 | 0 |

- The team highlighted in blue has clinched the minor premiership
- Teams highlighted in green have qualified for the finals
- The team highlighted in red has clinched the wooden spoon

== Fixtures ==
=== Pre-season ===
| Date | Round | Opponent | Venue | Score | Tries | Goals |
|---|---|---|---|---|---|---|
| Saturday, 22 February | Trial 1 | CQ Capras | National Football Stadium | 30 – 12 | | |
| Saturday, 29 February | Trial 2 | Northern Pride | Barlow Park | 24 – 36 | | |
Legend: Win Loss Draw Bye

=== Regular season ===
| Date | Round | Opponent | Venue | Score | Tries | Goals | Attendance |
|---|---|---|---|---|---|---|---|
| Sunday, 15 March | Round 1 | Souths Logan Magpies | Davies Park | 32-30 | Wapi 3, Appo 2 | Boas 6/6 | |
Legend: Win Loss Draw Bye
