= 2019 Oceania Cup (rugby league) =

- Number of teams: 6
- Host countries: Australia; New Zealand
- Winner: Cup: Australia; Shield: Fiji
- Matches played: 6
- Attendance: 84,268 (14,045 per match)
- Points scored: 240 (40 per match)
- Tries scored: 43 (7.17 per match)
- Top scorer: (Fiji) Brandon Wakeham (16)
- Top try scorer: (Fiji) Viliame Kikau (3)

The 2019 Oceania Cup was the inaugural edition of the Oceania Cup. Contested by six teams, the competition began in June and concluded in November.

The competition was announced at the Rugby League International Federation (RLIF) congress in November 2018. The draw was released in March and breaks the six teams into two separate pools with promotion and relegation to exist in what is to become an annual tournament. Group A will comprise the top three ranked Pacific nations in Australia, New Zealand and Tonga while Group B will comprise Fiji, Samoa and Papua New Guinea.

The winner of Pool A will win the Oceania Cup while the winner of Pool B will win the Oceania Shield and be promoted to Pool A in the next edition in place of Australia, who were due to travel to Europe for their first Kangaroos tour since 2003.

== Venues ==
The games were played at the following venues in New Zealand and Australia.

Auckland	Auckland	Wollongong
Eden Park	Mt Smart Stadium	WIN Stadium
Capacity: 50,000	Capacity: 30,000	Capacity: 23,000
Sydney	Christchurch	
Leichhardt Oval	Rugby League Park	
Capacity: 20,000	Capacity: 18,000	

== Results ==
=== Group A - Cup ===
Team	Pld	W	D	L	PF	PA	+/−	Pts
Australia	2	1	0	1	38	20	+18	2
New Zealand	2	1	0	1	38	40	−2	2
Tonga	2	1	0	1	30	46	−16	2

22 June 2019
17:40 NZST (UTC+12)

New Zealand	34–14	Tonga
Tries: 6 Johnson 30', 40', 44'; Smith 12'; Hughes 61'; Manu 68'; Goals: 5 Marsters 13', 31', 45', 63', 69' (5/6)	1st: 16–4; 2nd: 18–10 report	Tries: 3 Kata 22'; Taukeiaho 73'; Tupou 77'; Goals: 1 Taukeiaho 74' (1/2); Staggs (0/1)

Mount Smart Stadium, Auckland
Attendance: 23,624
Referee: Ben Cummins (Australia)
Video referee: Steve Chiddy (Australia)
Touch judges: Chris McMillan (New Zealand), Chris Sutton (Australia)

Team details
New Zealand		Position	Tonga
Name	Number	Position	Number	Name
Roger Tuivasa-Sheck	1	FB	1	William Hopoate (c)
Ken Maumalo	2	WG	2	David Fusitu'a
Esan Marsters	3	CE	3	Kotoni Staggs
Joseph Manu	4	CE	4	Solomone Kata
Dallin Watene-Zelezniak (c)	5	WG	5	Daniel Tupou
Shaun Johnson	6	FE	6	John Asiata
Benji Marshall	7	HB	7	Tuimoala Lolohea
Jesse Bromwich	8	PR	10	Sio Siua Taukeiaho
Brandon Smith	9	HK	9	Siliva Havili
Jared Waerea-Hargreaves	10	PF	10	Addin Fonua-Blake
Kenny Bromwich	11	SR	11	Tevita Pangai Junior
Briton Nikora	12	SR	12	Manu Ma'u
Isaac Liu	13	LK	13	Jason Taumalolo (c)
Jahrome Hughes	14	IN	14	Manase Fainu
Leeson Ah Mau	15	IN	16	Peni Terepo
Nelson Asofa-Solomona	16	IN	17	Sitili Tupouniua
James Fisher-Harris	17	IN	19	Tevita Tatola
(Australia) Michael Maguire		Coach		(Australia) Kristian Woolf
NRL.com

Notes:

- Jahrome Hughes, Briton Nikora (both New Zealand), Manase Fainu, Kotoni Staggs, and Sitili Tupouniua (all Tonga) made their Test debuts, while John Asiata made his debut for Tonga having previously represented Samoa.

25 October 2019
20:10 AEDT (UTC+11)

Australia	26–4	New Zealand
Tries: Addo-Carr, Cook, Frizell, Tedesco; Goals: Mitchell (4/5), Cherry-Evans (1/1)	Report	Tries: Nicoll-Klokstad; Goals: Johnson (0/1)

WIN Stadium, Wollongong
Attendance: 18,104
Referee: Gerard Sutton (Australia)

Team details

FB	1	James Tedesco
WG	2	Josh Addo-Carr
CE	3	Latrell Mitchell
CE	4	Jack Wighton
WG	5	Nick Cotric
FE	6	Cameron Munster
HB	7	Daly Cherry-Evans
PR	8	Josh Papalii
HK	9	Damien Cook
PR	10	David Klemmer
SR	11	Boyd Cordner (c)
SR	12	Tyson Frizell
LK	13	Jake Trbojevic
Interchange:
BE	14	Ben Hunt
BE	15	Payne Haas
BE	16	Paul Vaughan
BE	17	Wade Graham
Coach:
Mal Meninga

FB	1	Roger Tuivasa-Sheck
WG	2	Ken Maumalo
CE	3	Charnze Nicoll-Klokstad
CE	4	Joseph Manu
WG	5	Jamayne Isaako
FE	6	Shaun Johnson
HB	7	Benji Marshall (c)
PR	8	Leeson Ah Mau
HK	9	Brandon Smith
PR	10	Jared Waerea-Hargreaves
SR	11	Briton Nikora
SR	12	Kenny Bromwich
LK	13	Adam Blair
Interchange:
BE	14	Jahrome Hughes
BE	15	Zane Tetevano
BE	16	Braden Hamlin-Uele
BE	17	Corey Harawira-Naera
Coach:
Michael Maguire

Man of the Match:
Damien Cook (Australia)

Touch judges:
Nick Beashel (Australia)
Dave Munro (Australia)
Video referees:
Ben Galea (Australia)
Jared Maxwell (Australia)

Notes:

- Josh Addo-Carr, Nick Cotric, Payne Haas, Jack Wighton (all Australia), Braden Hamlin-Uele, and Corey Harawira-Naera (both New Zealand) made their Test debuts, while Paul Vaughan made his debut for Australia having previously represented Italy, and Charnze Nicoll-Klokstad and Zane Tetevano made their debut for New Zealand both having previously represented the Cook Islands.

2 November 2019
19:40 NZDT (UTC+13)

Tonga	16–12	Australia
Tries: Hopoate, Jennings, Pangai Junior; Goals: Staggs (2/4)	Report	Tries: Wighton, Vaughan; Goals: Mitchell (2/2)

Eden Park, Auckland
Attendance: 25,257
Referee: Gerard Sutton (Australia)

Team details

FB	1	William Hopoate
WG	2	David Fusitu'a
CE	3	Michael Jennings
CE	4	Konrad Hurrell
WG	5	Daniel Tupou
FE	6	Tuimoala Lolohea
HB	21	Kotoni Staggs
PR	15	Addin Fonua-Blake
HK	9	Siliva Havili
PR	10	Sio Siua Taukeiaho (c)
SR	11	Ben Murdoch-Masila
SR	12	Manu Ma'u
LK	13	Jason Taumalolo (c)
Interchange:
BE	8	Andrew Fifita
BE	14	Sione Katoa
BE	19	Tevita Pangai Junior
BE	20	Joe Ofahengaue
Coach:
Kristian Woolf

FB	1	James Tedesco
WG	2	Josh Addo-Carr
CE	3	Latrell Mitchell
CE	4	Jack Wighton
WG	5	Nick Cotric
FE	6	Cameron Munster
HB	7	Daly Cherry-Evans
PR	8	Josh Papalii
HK	9	Damien Cook
PR	10	David Klemmer
SR	11	Boyd Cordner (c)
SR	12	Tyson Frizell
LK	13	Jake Trbojevic
Interchange:
BE	14	Cameron Murray
BE	15	Payne Haas
BE	16	Paul Vaughan
BE	17	Wade Graham
Coach:
Mal Meninga

Touch judges:
Nick Beashel (Australia)
Dave Munro (Australia)
Video referee:
Jared Maxwell (Australia)

Notes:

- Cameron Murray (Australia) made his Test debut.

=== Group B - Shield ===
Team	Pld	W	D	L	PF	PA	+/−	Pts
Fiji	2	2	0	0	66	38	+28	4
Samoa	2	1	0	1	42	50	−8	2
Papua New Guinea	2	0	0	2	26	46	−20	0

22 June 2019
19:55 AEST (UTC+10)

Papua New Guinea	6–24	Samoa
Tries: Wapi; Goals: Martin (1/1)	report	Tries: Aloiai, Harris-Tavita, Luai, Paulo; Goals: Isaako (4/4)

Leichhardt Oval, Sydney
Attendance: 8,408
Referee: Adam Gee (Australia)

Team details

FB	1	Edene Gebbie
WG	2	Junior Rau
CE	3	Bernard Lewis
CE	4	Xavier Coates
WG	5	Terry Wapi
FE	6	Edwin Ipape
HB	7	Kyle Laybutt
PR	8	Enock Maki
HK	9	James Segeyaro (c)
PR	10	Luke Page
SR	11	Rhyse Martin
SR	12	Nixon Putt
LK	13	Moses Meninga
Interchange:
BE	14	Kurt Baptiste
BE	15	Rhadley Brawa
BE	16	Zev John
BE	17	Stanton Albert
Coach:
Michael Marum

FB	1	Jamayne Isaako
WG	2	Jorge Taufua
CE	3	Hymel Hunt
CE	4	Marion Seve
WG	5	David Nofoaluma
FE	6	Chanel Harris-Tavita
HB	7	Anthony Milford (c)
PR	8	Junior Paulo
HK	9	Jarome Luai
PR	17	Josh Aloiai
SR	11	Raymond Faitala-Mariner
SR	12	Jaydn Su'A
LK	13	Martin Taupau
Interchange:
BE	10	James Gavet
BE	14	Mason Lino
BE	15	Michael Chee-Kam
BE	16	Herman Ese'ese
Coach:
Matt Parish

Touch judges:
Nick Morel (Australia)
David Munro (Australia)
Video referees:
Henry Perenara (New Zealand)
Bryan Norrie (Australia)

Notes:

- Xavier Coates, Edene Gebbie, Edwin Ipape, Zev John, Kyle Laybutt, Bernard Lewis, Terry Wapi (all Papua New Guinea), Chanel Harris-Tavita, Hymel Hunt, Marion Seve, and Jaydn Su'A (all Samoa) made their Test debuts, while Jamayne Isaako made his debut for Samoa having previously represented New Zealand.

2 November 2019
14:20 NZDT (UTC+13)

Samoa	18–44	Fiji
Tries: Taufua (2), Lafai, Mulitalo; Goals: Lafai (1/4)	Report	Tries: Kikau (2), Miller, Lovodua, Lumelume, Naiqama, Ratuvakacereivalu, Wiliame; Goals: Wakeham (5/6), Moceidreke (1/2)

Eden Park, Auckland
Attendance: 25,257
Referee: Grant Atkins (Australia)

Team details

FB	1	Ronaldo Mulitalo
WG	2	Jorge Taufua
CE	3	Tim Lafai
CE	4	Joseph Leilua (c)
WG	5	Brian To'o
FE	6	Marion Seve
HB	7	Jarome Luai
PR	8	Junior Paulo
HK	9	Danny Levi
PR	10	Martin Taupau
SR	11	Tino Fa'asuamaleaui
SR	12	Michael Chee-Kam
LK	14	Dunamis Lui
Interchange:
BE	13	Bunty Afoa
BE	15	Moses Leota
BE	16	Luciano Leilua
BE	17	James Gavet
Coach:
Matt Parish

FB	1	Sitiveni Moceidreke
WG	2	Isaac Lumelume
CE	3	Taane Milne
CE	4	Brayden Wiliame
WG	5	Suliasi Vunivalu
FE	6	Kevin Naiqama (c)
HB	7	Brandon Wakeham
PR	8	Kane Evans
HK	9	Joe Lovodua
PR	10	Tui Kamikamica
SR	11	Viliame Kikau
SR	12	Ben Nakubuwai
LK	13	D'Rhys Miller
Interchange:
BE	14	Lamar Liolevave
BE	15	Joseph Ratuvakacereivalu
BE	18	King Vuniyayawa
BE	19	Penioni Tagituimua
Coach:
Brandon Costin

Touch judges:
Paki Parkinson (New Zealand)
Stephane Vincent (France)
Video referee:
Jared Maxwell (Australia)

Notes:

- Tino Fa'asuamaleaui, Luciano Leilua, Moses Leota, Ronaldo Mulitalo, Brian To'o (all Samoa), Lamar Liolevave, and Joseph Ratuvakacereivalu (both Fiji) made their Test debuts, while Danny Levi made his debut for Samoa having previously represented New Zealand.

9 November 2019
17:20 NZDT (UTC+13)

Fiji	22–20	Papua New Guinea
Tries: Kamikamica, Kikau, Nakubuwai, Wiliame; Goals: Wakeham (3/4)		Tries: Boas, Gebbie, Martin; Goals: Martin (4/4)

Rugby League Park, Christchurch
Attendance: 8,875
Referee: Chris Kendall (England)

Team details

FB	1	Sitiveni Moceidreke
WG	2	Maika Sivo
CE	3	Taane Milne
CE	4	Brayden Wiliame
WG	5	Suliasi Vunivalu
FE	6	Kevin Naiqama (c)
HB	7	Brandon Wakeham
PR	8	Kane Evans
HK	9	Joe Lovodua
PR	10	Tui Kamikamica
SR	11	Viliame Kikau
SR	12	Ben Nakubuwai
LK	13	D'Rhys Miller
Interchange:
BE	14	Lamar Liolevave
BE	15	Joseph Ratuvakacereivalu
BE	18	King Vuniyayawa
BE	19	Penioni Tagituimua
Coach:
Brandon Costin

FB	1	Alex Johnston
WG	2	Edene Gebbie
CE	3	Daniel Russell
CE	4	Justin Olam
WG	5	Terry Wapi
FE	6	Kyle Laybutt
HB	7	Watson Boas
PR	8	Wellington Albert
HK	9	Wartovo Puara
PR	10	Luke Page
SR	11	Nixon Putt
SR	12	Rhyse Martin (c)
LK	13	Moses Meninga
Interchange:
BE	14	Edwin Ipape
BE	15	Stanton Albert
BE	16	Enock Maki
BE	17	Stargroth Amean
Coach:
Michael Marum

Touch judges:
Chris Butler (Australia)
Paki Parkinson (New Zealand)
Video referee:
Shayne Hayne (Australia)

Notes:

- Daniel Russell (Papua New Guinea) made his Test debut, while Alex Johnston made his debut for Papua New Guinea having previously represented Australia.

== See also ==
- International rugby league in 2019
