= Epel Kapinias =

PNG international rugby league footballer

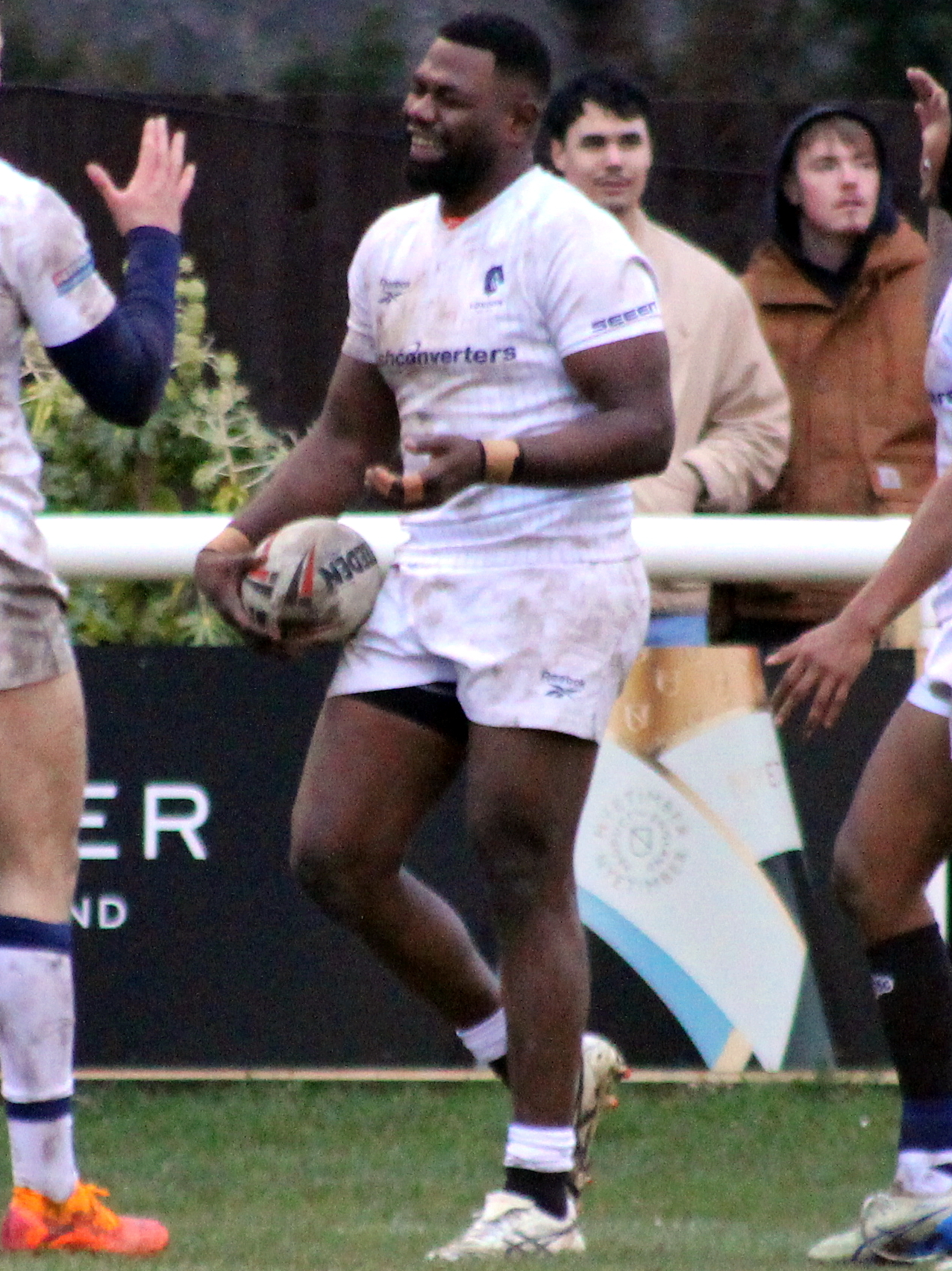

Personal information
- Full name: Epel Kapinias
- Born: 5 January 1998 (age 28) Port Moresby, Papua New Guinea
- Height: 6 ft 1 in (1.86 m)
- Weight: 16 st 10 lb (106 kg)

Playing information
- Position: Prop, Loose forward
Club
Years	Team	Pld	T	G	FG	P
2019–21	PNG Hunters	30	3	0	0	12
2022	Wynnum Manly Seagulls	10	2	0	0	8
2023–25	PNG Hunters	34	1	0	0	4
2026–	London Broncos	21	11	0	0	44
	Total	95	17	0	0	68
Representative
Years	Team	Pld	T	G	FG	P
2022–25	PNG Prime Minister's XIII	2	1	0	0	4
2022–	Papua New Guinea	9	4	0	0	16
- Source: As of 19 November 2026

Epel Kapinias is a Papua New Guinea professional rugby league footballer who plays as a prop for the London Broncos in the Super League and Papua New Guinea at international level.

== Career ==
=== London Broncos ===
On 19 November 2025 it was reported that he had signed for the London Broncos in the RFL Championship.

In August 2026, he was part of the Broncos squad that lifted the RFL Championship Leaders' Shield.

He played in London's 1895 Cup Final victory over the Widnes Vikings at the Halliwell Jones Stadium in August 2026.

In 2026 he was part of the London Broncos squad that secured their historic treble of League Leaders' Shield, 1895 Cup and Grand Final victories.

=== Representative ===
Kapinias made his international debut for Papua New Guinea in their 24-14 victory over Fiji in the 2022 Pacific Test.

On 12 October 2025 he scored a try for PNG Prime Minister's XIII in the 28-10 defeat to Australia's Prime Minister's XIII in Port Moresby.

== Club statistics ==
Year	Club	League Competition	Appearances	Tries	Goals	Drop goals	Points	Notes
2019	Papua New Guinea Hunters	Queensland Cup	19	0	0	0	0	
2020	Papua New Guinea Hunters	Queensland Cup	1	0	0	0	0	
2021	Papua New Guinea Hunters	Queensland Cup	10	3	0	0	12	
2022	Wynnum Manly Seagulls	Queensland Cup	10	2	0	0	8	
2023	Papua New Guinea Hunters	Queensland Cup	20	1	0	0	4	
2024	Papua New Guinea Hunters	Queensland Cup	0	0	0	0	0	
2025	Papua New Guinea Hunters	Queensland Cup	14	0	0	0	0	
2026	London Broncos	RFL Championship	21	11	0	0	44	
2027	London Broncos	Super League						
Club career total			95	17	0	0	68	
