= Peter Phillips (rugby league) =

Australian rugby league footballer

Personal information
- Full name: Peter Phillips
- Born: 1 January 1969 (age 56)

Playing information
- Position: Five-eighth, Centre, Fullback,
Club
Years	Team	Pld	T	G	FG	P
1987–89	Illawarra Steelers	46	5	0	0	20
1990–92	Balmain Tigers	17	0	0	0	0
1994	St. George Dragons	1	0	0	0	0
1995	Illawarra Steelers	6	1	0	0	4
	Total	70	6	0	0	24
- Relatives: Damien Cook (nephew)

Peter Phillips (born 1 January 1969) is an Australian former professional rugby league footballer who played in the 1990s.

== Playing career ==
Phillips began his career at the Illawarra Steelers in the 1987 NSWRL season. He made his debut in round 1 as the Steelers defeated the South Sydney Rabbitohs 25–2. He came off the bench and contributed two tries. He started his first game in a 32–12 win against the Western Suburbs Magpies and overall, he played 20 matches in his rookie season. The following season, he played another 20 games for the Steelers, scoring tries in three of those matches. The next year, he played just six matches for the Steelers, in what would be his last season in that tenure with the Illawarra club.

For the 1990 premiership season, he signed with the Balmain Tigers. He, however, only played one match in his first year with the team. In the following year's competition, he played 13 matches. mostly off the bench. The next season, he played three matches for the Balmain outfit in what would become his last season with the side.

For the 1994 competition, he signed with the St. George Dragons. He only ended up playing one match for the Kogarah-based club, coming off the bench in a 24–6 loss against Canterbury.

In his last year, he rejoined the Steelers. In his first match back, he again scored a try against South Sydney to gift his side the win 20–16. He played six matches, all off the bench, before retiring from rugby league.

== Personal life ==
He is the uncle of current representative hooker Damien Cook.
