= Damien Cook =

Australia international rugby league footballer

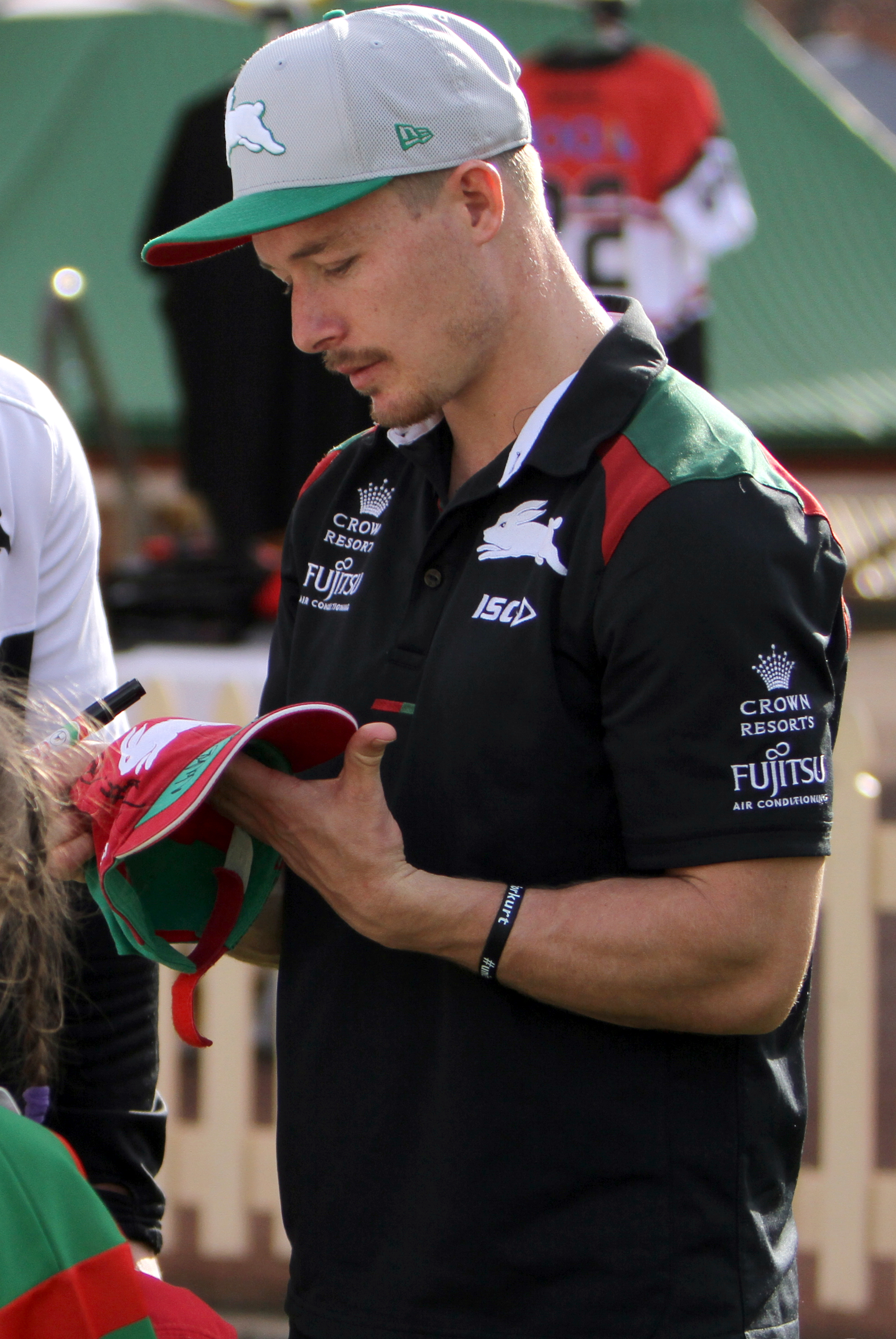

Personal information
- Born: 23 June 1991 (age 35) Sutherland, New South Wales, Australia
- Height: 180 cm (5 ft 11 in)
- Weight: 88 kg (13 st 12 lb)

Playing information
- Position: Hooker
Club
Years	Team	Pld	T	G	FG	P
2013	St. George Illawarra	2	0	0	0	0
2014–15	Canterbury Bulldogs	7	4	0	0	16
2016–24	South Sydney	207	31	16	0	156
2025–26	St. George Illawarra	47	3	0	0	12
2027–	Castleford Tigers	0	0	0	0	0
	Total	263	38	16	0	184
Representative
Years	Team	Pld	T	G	FG	P
2017	Country NSW	1	0	0	0	0
2018–23	New South Wales	17	3	0	0	12
2018–19	Australia	4	1	0	0	4
2024	Prime Minister's XIII	1	0	0	0	0
- Source: As of 15 November 2026
- Education: Endeavour Sports High School
- Relatives: Peter Phillips (uncle)

Damien Cook (born 23 June 1991) is an Australian professional rugby league footballer who plays as a hooker for the Castleford Tigers in the Super League.

He previously played for the St. George Illawarra Dragons, South Sydney Rabbitohs, and the Canterbury-Bankstown Bulldogs in the National Rugby League, and at representative level for Country NSW, New South Wales in the State of Origin series, and Australia at international level. He will join the Castleford Tigers from the 2027 season.

== Background ==
Cook was born in Sutherland, New South Wales, Australia. He was educated at Endeavour Sports High School, where he also dabbled in rugby union and excelled in Australian Football, and Illawarra Sports High School. He is the nephew of former rugby league player Peter Phillips.

Cook grew up in his home town of Helensburgh, New South Wales, in the Illawarra region of Australia. He was a state champion in the NSW Surf Life Saving Championships throughout his youth.

He played his junior rugby league for the Helensburgh Tigers, before being signed by the Penrith Panthers.

== Playing career ==
In 2010 and 2011, Cook played for the Penrith Panthers' NYC team. In 2012, he joined the Illawarra Cutters in the New South Wales Cup. On 30 October 2012, he signed a one-year contract with the St. George Illawarra Dragons starting in 2013.

=== 2013 ===
In round 6 of the 2013 NRL season, Cook made his NRL debut for St. George against the Wests Tigers. On 22 September, he was named on the interchange bench in the 2013 New South Wales Cup Team of the Year. On 6 November, he signed a two-year contract with the Canterbury Bulldogs starting in 2014.

=== 2014 ===
In round 14 of the 2014 NRL season, Cook made his Canterbury debut against the Parramatta Eels.

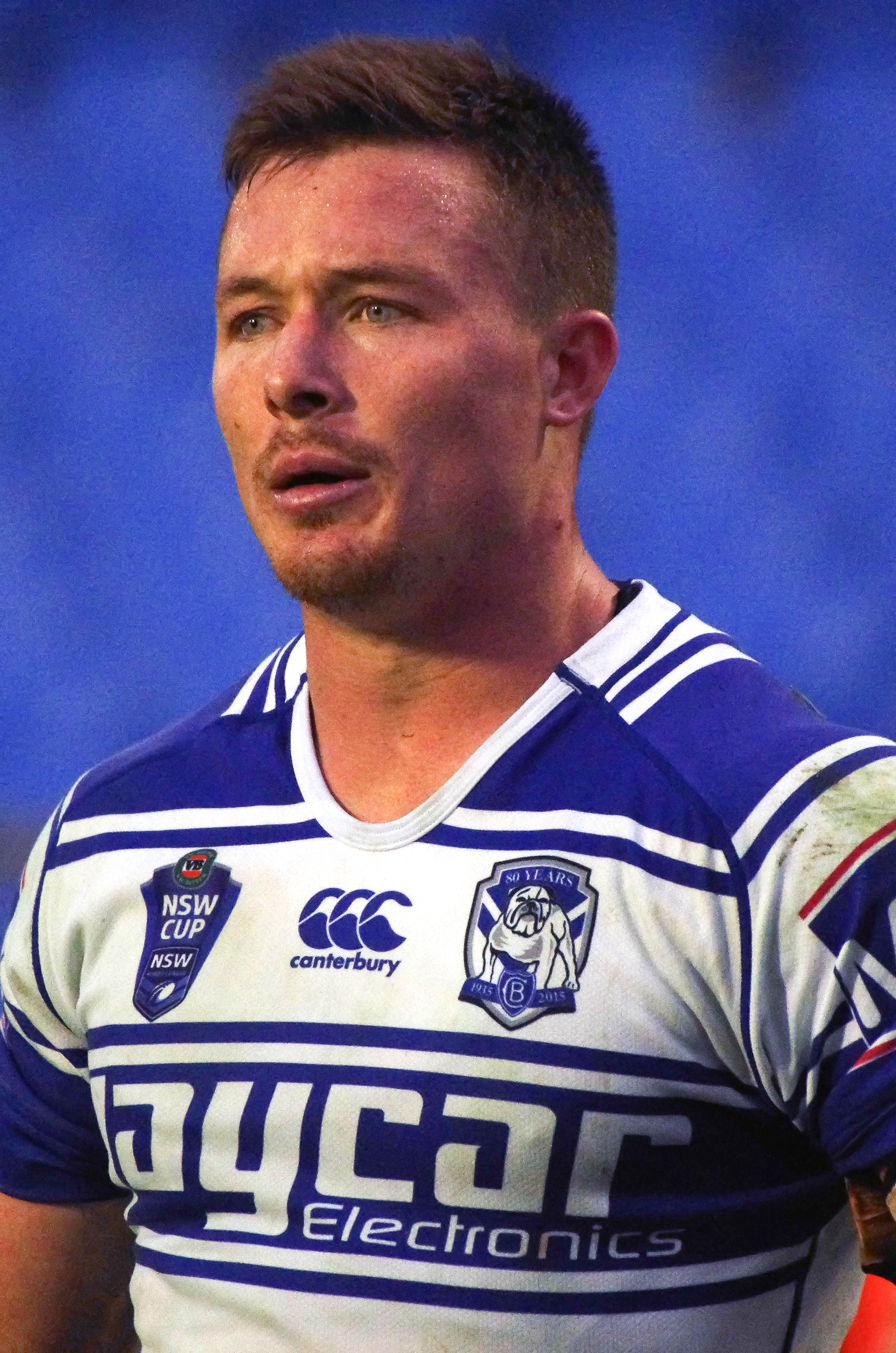
Cook playing for the Bulldogs

=== 2015 ===
On 31 January and 1 February, Cook played for Canterbury in the 2015 NRL Auckland Nines.

On 27 September, Cook was named on the interchange bench in the 2015 New South Wales Cup Team of the Year, for a second year. On 15 October, Cook signed a 2-year contract with the South Sydney Rabbitohs starting in 2016. Cook played a total of 37 reserve grade games for Canterbury and scored two tries.

=== 2016 ===
On 1 February, Cook was named in South Sydney's 2016 NRL Auckland Nines squad.

On 6 March 2016, Cook made his debut for Souths against the Sydney Roosters in Souths 42–10 win. Cook went on to play a further 17 times for the 2016 NRL season. Cook also featured for Norths in The NSW Cup making two appearances.

=== 2017 ===
Cook was named in South Sydney's squad for the 2017 NRL Auckland Nines.

On 1 May 2017, Cook was named in The NSW Country Origin representative team to play against The NSW City representative side in the last ever City vs Country game.

=== 2018 ===
Cook started the 2018 NRL season as the first choice hooker for Souths over Robbie Farah. This year was Cook's most successful year. He made his debut for NSW in state of origin and the Australian Kangaroos. On 28 May 2018, Cook was selected to play for NSW against Queensland in the 2018 State of Origin series after a number of good performances at club level. Cook played in all 3 games for New South Wales as they won their first origin series since 2014. Cook was part of the Souths side which finished 3rd on the table at the end of the regular season and made it all the way to the preliminary final before being defeated by archrivals the Sydney Roosters 12–4.

He capped a stellar season by earning selection in the Australian Kangaroos team as starting hooker for Test matches against New Zealand and Tonga.

On 5 December, Cook signed a five-year deal worth $4.5 million to stay with Souths until the end of 2023.

=== 2019 ===
After a good start to the 2019 NRL season for Souths, Cook was selected to play for New South Wales in the 2019 State of Origin series. In the series decider at ANZ Stadium, Cook scored a brilliant individual try as New South Wales defeated Queensland 26-20 winning their second series in a row. The match was won in the last 20 seconds courtesy of a try scored by James Tedesco.

Cook made a total of 26 appearances for Souths in the 2019 NRL season as the club finished third on the table and qualified for the finals. Cook played in all three of the club's finals games as they reached the preliminary final against the Canberra Raiders. Cook had a game to forget in the preliminary final which culminated when he missed a one on one tackle with Canberra forward Josh Papalii who scored under the posts to win the match 16–10. On 7 October, Cook was named in the Australian side for the Oceania Cup fixtures.

=== 2020 ===
Cook played 23 games for South Sydney in the 2020 NRL season. Cook played in the club's third straight preliminary final but the club once again fell short of a grand final appearance losing to Penrith 20–16.

Cook was again selected to play for New South Wales in the 2020 State of Origin series. In game 1 of the series he scored the opening try, but NSW lost the match 18–14. He played all three games in the series as New South Wales suffered a shock 2–1 series defeat.

=== 2021 ===
Cook played in all three games of the 2021 State of Origin series as New South Wales won the series 2–1.

He played a total of 24 games for South Sydney in the 2021 NRL season including the club's grand final loss to Penrith.

=== 2022 ===
In round 6 of the 2022 NRL season, Cook scored his first career hat-trick in South Sydney's 36–16 victory over Canterbury. On 29 May, Cook was selected by New South Wales to play in game one of the 2022 State of Origin series. Cook played in all three games as New South Wales lost the series 2-1 Cook played 23 games for South Sydney in the 2022 NRL season including all three of the clubs finals matches as they reached the preliminary final for a fifth straight season. Souths would lose in the preliminary final to eventual premiers Penrith 32–12.

=== 2023 ===
After not being selected by New South Wales for game one of the 2023 State of Origin series, Cook was chosen to play in game two after Apisai Koroisau was ruled out of the series with a suspected broken jaw. Cook played a total of 23 games throughout the year as South Sydney finished 9th on the table and missed the finals.

=== 2024 ===
After South Sydney started the season poorly winning only one match from their opening five games, Cook was left out of the starting 17 for the clubs round 6 game against Cronulla. On 19 June, Cook signed a two-year deal to join St. George Illawarra starting in 2025. Cook played a total of 23 games for South Sydney in his final year at the club as they finished 16th on the table. Cook's last game for South Sydney was a 36–28 loss against arch-rivals the Sydney Roosters.

=== 2025 ===
On 13 January, Cook was named co-captain of St. George Illawarra alongside teammate Clinton Gutherson for the 2025 season.

Cook played every game for St. George Illawarra in the 2025 NRL season as the club endured a difficult campaign finishing 15th on the table.

=== 2026 ===
On 8 May, it was reported that Cook would depart the Dragons at the end of the season to join the Castleford Tigers in the Super League. Hours later, the Dragons confirmed Cook's departure from the club, and Castleford subsequently announced his signing on a two-year deal. Cook played 21 games for St. George Illawarra in the 2026 NRL season as the club finished with the Wooden Spoon. It was the clubs first wooden spoon and the first any St. George affiliated side had received since 1938.

== Statistics ==
Year	Team	Games	Tries	Goals	Pts
2013	St. George Illawarra Dragons	2			
2014	Canterbury-Bankstown Bulldogs	2			
2015	Canterbury-Bankstown Bulldogs	5	4		16
2016	South Sydney Rabbitohs	17		7	14
2017	South Sydney Rabbitohs	23	2		8
2018	South Sydney Rabbitohs	25	4		16
2019	South Sydney Rabbitohs	26	3		12
2020	South Sydney Rabbitohs	23	5		20
2021	South Sydney Rabbitohs	24	2		8
2022	South Sydney Rabbitohs	23	8		32
2023	South Sydney Rabbitohs	23	3		12
2024	South Sydney Rabbitohs	23	5		16
2025	St. George Illawarra Dragons	24	1		4
2026	St. George Illawarra Dragons	21	2		8
2027	Castleford Tigers				
	Totals	262	38	7	184
