= Joseph Ratuvakacereivalu =

Fiji international rugby league footballer

Joey Ratuvakacereivalu
Personal information
- Full name: Joseph Ratuvakacereivalu
- Born: 20 January 1999 (age 27) Fiji
- Height: 190 cm (6 ft 3 in)
- Weight: 109 kg (17 st 2 lb)

Playing information
- Position: Prop
Representative
Years	Team	Pld	T	G	FG	P
2019	Fiji Prime Minister's XIII	1	0	0	0	0
2019–	Fiji	3	1	0	0	4
- Source: As of 25 May 2026

Joseph Ratuvakacereivalu (born 12 January 1999) is a Fiji international rugby league footballer who plays as a prop.

== Background ==
Ratuvakacereivalu played his junior rugby league for Campbelltown City Kangaroos.

== Playing career ==
Ratuvakacereivalu represented Fiji in the 2019 Oceania Cup.

In 2021 he played for the Queensland Cup side, Redcliffe Dolphins. The following year he signed to the Northern Pride.
