= Jackson Frei =

Australian rugby league footballer

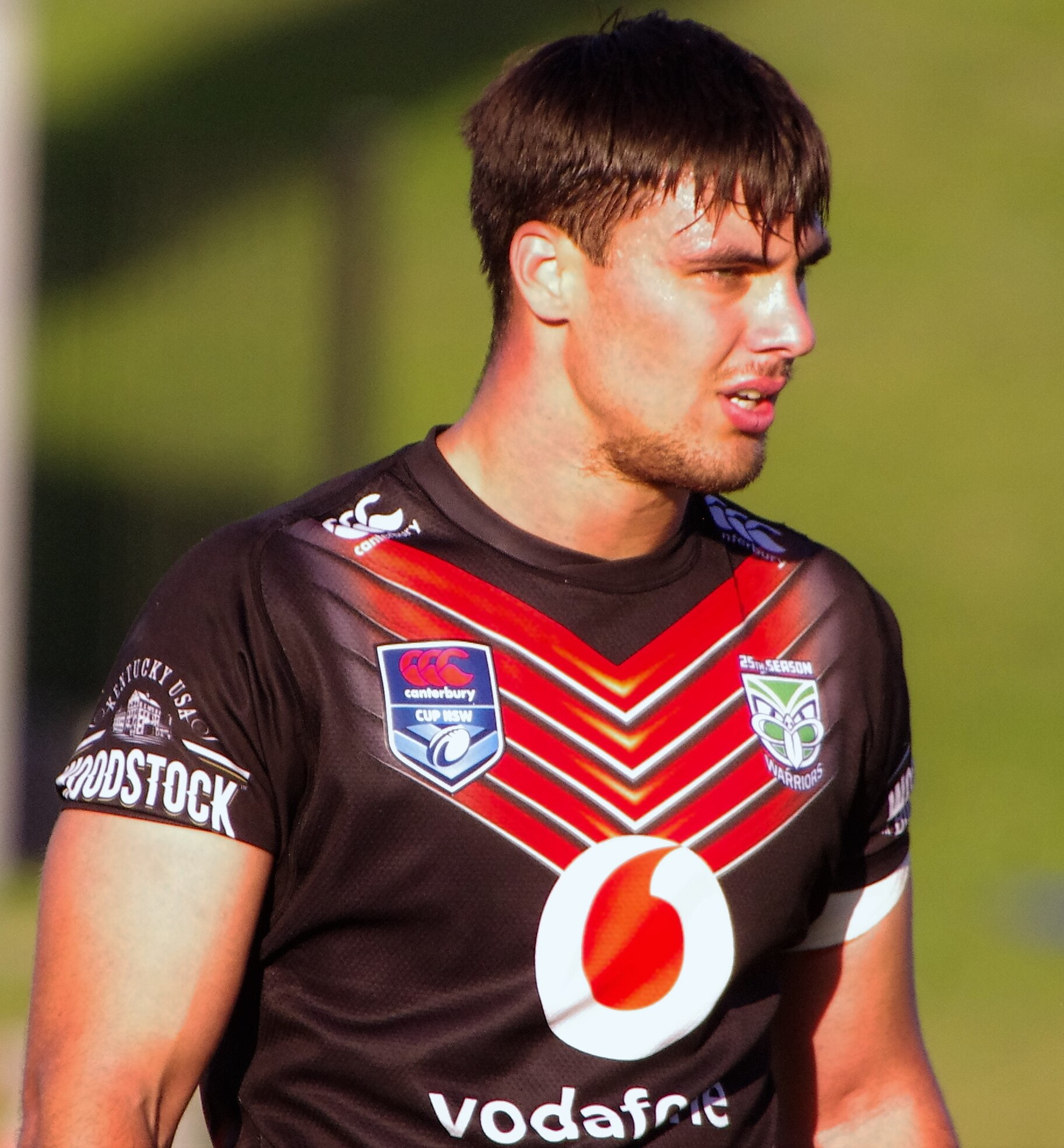

Personal information
- Full name: Jackson Frei
- Born: 27 January 1998 (age 27); Brisbane, Queensland, Australia
- Height: 195 cm (6 ft 5 in)
- Weight: 107 kg (16 st 12 lb)

Playing information
- Position: Prop, Second-row
Club
Years	Team	Pld	T	G	FG	P
2021–22	New Zealand Warriors	3	0	0	0	0
- Source: As of 15 August 2021

Jackson Frei (born 27 January 1998) is an Australian professional rugby league footballer who plays as a prop.

He previously played for the New Zealand Warriors in the National Rugby League.

== Career ==
=== 2018 & 2019 ===
Frei started his career in the Sydney Roosters junior system, playing for their SG ball and under 20's team. In 2018, Frei played for the Sydney Roosters feeder club the Wyong Roos in the NSW cup competition, before moving the New Zealand Warriors in 2019. Frei featured for the club in the NSW Cup before injury plagued his season.

=== 2020 ===
In 2020, Frei had a development contract with the New Zealand Warriors, before tearing his ACL in a trial against the Melbourne Storm, forcing him to miss the remainder of the 2020 season.

=== 2021 ===
In Round 22 2021, Frei made his NRL debut for the Warriors against the Canterbury-Bankstown Bulldogs at Moreton Daily Stadium in Redcliffe in a 24-10 win.

=== 2022 ===
Frei made a total of two appearances for the New Zealand Warriors. Although not released until 6 September by the Warriors, he did also play thirteen games for the Redcliffe Dolphins in the Queensland Cup.
