= Henry Wan =

PNG international rugby league footballer

Personal information
- Full name: Henry Wan Noki
- Born: 23 July 1991 (age 34) Mount Hagen, Papua New Guinea
- Height: 187 cm (6 ft 2 in)
- Weight: 106 kg (16 st 10 lb)

Playing information
- Position: Prop
Club
Years	Team	Pld	T	G	FG	P
	Papua New Guinea Hunters
	Limoux Grizzlies
	Total	0	0	0	0	0
Representative
Years	Team	Pld	T	G	FG	P
2016–17	Papua New Guinea	2	0	0	0	0
Medals
Men's rugby league nines
Representing Papua New Guinea
Pacific Games
Gold medal – first place	2015 Port Moresby	Team

Henry Wan Noki (born 23 July 1991) is a Papua New Guinean rugby league footballer who plays for the Papua New Guinea Hunters in the Queensland Cup. He has also represented Papua New Guinea Kumuls at the international level.
