= Scott Murray (rugby league, born 1972) =

Australian rugby league footballer and coach

Personal information
- Born: 27 August 1972 (age 53)

Playing information
- Position: Centre, Five-eighth
Club
| Years | Team | Pld | T | G | FG | P |
|---|---|---|---|---|---|---|
| 1992–95 | Eastern Suburbs | 30 | 3 | 0 | 0 | 12 |
| 1996 | St. George Dragons | 1 | 0 | 0 | 0 | 0 |
| 1997–99 | South Sydney | 16 | 0 | 0 | 0 | 0 |
| 2000–01 | Cronulla Sharks | 3 | 1 | 0 | 0 | 4 |
| | Total | 50 | 4 | 0 | 0 | 16 |

Scott Murray (born 27 August 1972) is an Australian former professional rugby league footballer who played for Eastern Suburbs, St. George, South Sydney and Cronulla-Sutherland.

Murray was a Paddington Colts junior. He represented the Australian Schoolboys rugby union team while attending Randwick Boys High School in 1990.

Murray made his first grade debut for Easts in the round eight win over Cronulla-Sutherland on 16 May 1992. He made 50 first-grade appearances in his 10-year career at the top level. During his first-grade career he was used in various positions, but featured mostly as a centre and five-eighth. He has coached the Sydney Roosters, South Sydney and Canterbury in the now defunct NRL Under-20s competition.
