= 2022 Queensland Cup =

- Teams: 14
- Premiers: Norths Devils (3rd title)
- Minor premiers: Burleigh Bears (3rd title)
- Top points scorer: Josh Rogers (208)
- Player of the year: Taine Tuaupiki (Petero Civoniceva Medal)
- Top try-scorer: Alofiana Khan-Pereira (22)

The 2022 Queensland Cup season was the 27th season of Queensland's top-level statewide rugby league competition run by the Queensland Rugby League. The competition, known as the Hostplus Cup due to sponsorship, featured 14 teams playing a 24-week long season (including finals) from March to September.

It is the first season played under Hostplus sponsorship, after 11 seasons known as the Intrust Super Cup.

Norths Devils won their second consecutive grand final, defeating the Redcliffe Dolphins 16–10 to take their third Queensland Cup premiership.

== Teams ==
In 2022, the line-up of teams remained unchanged for the eighth consecutive season. Due to the COVID-19 pandemic, the PNG Hunters were based out of the Gold Coast for the second consecutive season, playing their home games at Runaway Bay's Bycroft Oval. The Hunters were able eventually to return to Port Moresby to play their final match of the season at the National Football Stadium.

Colours	Club	Home ground(s)	Head coach(s)	Captain(s)	NRL Affiliate
	Brisbane Tigers	Totally Workwear Stadium	Jon Buchanan	Darren Nicholls	Melbourne Storm
	Burleigh Bears	Pizzey Park	Rick Stone	Sami Sauiluma	Gold Coast Titans
	Central Queensland Capras	Browne Park	Lionel Harbin	Jack Madden	Brisbane Broncos
	Ipswich Jets	North Ipswich Reserve	Ben Cross	Nathaniel Neale	Newcastle Knights
	Mackay Cutters	BB Print Stadium	David Elliott	Ross Bella	North Queensland Cowboys
	Northern Pride	Barlow Park	Ty Williams	Jayden Hodges	North Queensland Cowboys
	Norths Devils	Bishop Park	Kevin Neighbour & Ben King	Jack Ahearn	Brisbane Broncos
	Papua New Guinea Hunters	Bycroft Oval	Matt Church	Keven Appo	None
	Redcliffe Dolphins	Moreton Daily Stadium	Scott Murray	Cameron Cullen	New Zealand Warriors
	Souths Logan Magpies	Davies Park	Steve Bretherton	Cameron Booth	Brisbane Broncos
	Sunshine Coast Falcons	Sunshine Coast Stadium	Brad Henderson	Tyson Smoothy	Melbourne Storm
	Townsville Blackhawks	Jack Manski Oval	Aaron Payne	Josh Chudleigh	North Queensland Cowboys
	Tweed Heads Seagulls	Piggabeen Sports Complex	Ben Woolf	Lamar Liolevave	Gold Coast Titans
	Wynnum-Manly Seagulls	BMD Kougari Oval	Adam Brideson	Sam Scarlett	Brisbane Broncos

== Regular season ==
- Fixtures & Results

Team	1	2	3	4	5	6	7	8	9	10	11	12	13	14	15	16	17	18	19	20	F1	F2	F3	GF
Brisbane Tigers	WMS +4	SLM; 0	PNG +10	**IPS** **+34**	**CQC** **+14**	MAC -12	X	SCF -8	NOR +12	BUR -48	**WMS** **-10**	TSV -12	**RED** **-6**	**NTP** **+2**	**SLM** **+4**	**PNG** **-8**	IPS +14	**SCF** **-4**	CQC +4	**TWE** **+8**	TWE -6			
Burleigh Bears	WMS +8	TSV +4	**RED** **+12**	**TWE** **-14**	**PNG** **+34**	X	SLM +22	**MAC** **+20**	CQC +6	**BRI** **+48**	SCF +10	**NOR** **+36**	NTP -4	**IPS** **+42**	**TSV** **+14**	NOR +28	TWE; 0	MAC -4	PNG -8	**WMS** **+24**	**NOR** **-1**	**CQC** **+14**	RED -12	
Central Queensland Capras	SLM +2	**PNG** **+10**	IPS +20	**MAC** **+8**	BRI -14	X	**NTP** **+24**	NOR -5	**BUR** **-6**	WMS +2	**TSV** **+6**	RED; 0	**TWE** **-6**	**SCF** **+2**	PNG +38	**SCF** **+6**	MAC -18	**NOR** **-7**	**BRI** **-4**	**SLM** **+20**	**NTP** **+8**	BUR -14		
Ipswich Jets	**NTP** **-20**	**MAC** **-40**	**CQC** **-20**	BRI -34	**NOR** **-4**	SCF −30	X	WMS -52	**TSV** **-30**	RED -54	**TWE** **-10**	SLM +8	**PNG** **+18**	BUR -42	MAC +6	TWE -12	**BRI** **-14**	**WMS** **+8**	NOR -40	NTP -22				
Mackay Cutters	**PNG** **-6**	IPS +40	**NTP** **+2**	CQC -8	SCF -20	**BRI** **+12**	X	BUR -20	**WMS** **-18**	TSV +10	**RED** **-2**	TWE +2	SLM +6	NOR -18	**IPS** **-6**	WMS -16	**CQC** **+18**	**BUR** **+4**	**SCF** **-18**	PNG -2				
Northern Pride	IPS +20	WMS -18	MAC -2	**TSV** **-10**	**RED** **+12**	X	CQC −24	TWE -28	**SCF**; **0**	SLM +8	**NOR** **-4**	**PNG** **+24**	**BUR** **+4**	BRI -2	**WMS** **+4**	**SLM** **+6**	TSV +12	**TWE** **-6**	RED -39	**IPS** **+22**	CQC -8			
Norths Devils	TSV +24	**RED** **-1**	TWE +9	**SLM** **+8**	IPS +4	X	PNG +4	**CQC** **+5**	**BRI** **-12**	**SCF** **-8**	NTP +4	BUR -36	**WMS** **-14**	**MAC** **+18**	RED -38	**BUR** **-28**	SLM +16	CQC +7	**IPS** **+40**	**TSV** **+8**	BUR +1	X	**SCF** **+7**	RED +6
Papua New Guinea Hunters	MAC +6	CQC -10	**BRI** **-10**	**SCF** **-14**	BUR -34	X	**NOR** **-4**	TSV +22	**RED** **-14**	TWE -2	**SLM** **+4**	NTP -24	IPS -18	WMS +14	**CQC** **-38**	BRI +8	SCF -38	**TSV**; **0**	**BUR** **+8**	**MAC** **+2**				
Redcliffe Dolphins	**SCF** **-20**	NOR +1	BUR -12	WMS -28	NTP -12	**TSV** **−1**	X	**SLM** **+32**	PNG +14	**IPS** **+54**	MAC +2	**CQC**; **0**	BRI +6	**TWE** **+26**	**NOR** **+38**	TSV; 0	**WMS** **+10**	SLM +12	**NTP** **+39**	SCF -2	SCF +6	X	**BUR** **+12**	NOR -6
Souths Logan Magpies	**CQC** **-2**	**BRI**; **0**	SCF -12	NOR -8	WMS +6	X	**BUR** **−22**	RED -32	**TWE** **-18**	**NTP** **-8**	PNG -4	**IPS** **-8**	**MAC** **-6**	TSV -72	BRI -4	NTP -6	**NOR** **-16**	**RED** **-12**	WMS +4	CQC -20				
Sunshine Coast Falcons	RED +20	TWE -22	**SLM** **+12**	PNG +14	**MAC** **+20**	**IPS** **+30**	X	**BRI** **+8**	NTP; 0	NOR +8	**BUR** **-10**	WMS -8	**TSV** **+10**	CQC -2	**TWE** **+8**	CQC -6	**PNG** **+38**	BRI +4	MAC +18	**RED** **+2**	**RED** **-6**	**TWE** **+2**	NOR -7	
Townsville Blackhawks	**NOR** **-24**	**BUR** **-4**	**WMS** **+16**	NTP +10	**TWE** **+13**	RED +1	X	**PNG** **-22**	IPS +30	**MAC** **-10**	CQC -6	**BRI** **+12**	SCF -10	**SLM** **+72**	BUR −14	**RED**; **0**	**NTP** **-12**	PNG; 0	TWE -42	NOR -8				
Tweed Heads Seagulls	**BRI** **-4**	**SCF** **+22**	**NOR** **-9**	BUR +14	TSV -13	**WMS** **−4**	X	**NTP** **+28**	SLM +18	**PNG** **+2**	IPS +10	**MAC** **-2**	CQC +6	RED -26	SCF −8	**IPS** **+12**	**BUR**; **0**	NTP +6	**TSW** **+42**	BRI -8	**BRI** **+6**	SCF -2		
Wynnum Manly Seagulls	**BUR** **-8**	**NTP** **+18**	TSV +16	**RED** **+28**	**SLM** **-6**	TWE +4	X	**IPS** **+52**	MAC +18	**CQC** **-2**	BRI +10	**SCF** **+8**	NOR +14	**PNG** **-14**	NTP −4	**MAC** **+16**	RED -10	IPS -8	**SLM** **-4**	BUR -24				
Team	1	2	3	4	5	6	7	8	9	10	11	12	13	14	15	16	17	18	19	20	F1	F2	F3	GF
Key: X Bold – Home game X – Bye Opponent for round listed above margin

== Ladder ==
2022 Queensland Cup
Pos	Team	Pld	W	D	L	B	PF	PA	PD	Pts
1	Burleigh Bears	19	14	1	4	1	634	356	+278	31
2	Sunshine Coast Falcons	19	13	1	5	1	470	326	+144	29
3	Redcliffe Dolphins	19	11	2	6	1	518	359	+159	26
4	Norths Devils (P)	19	12	0	7	1	469	459	+10	26
5	Central Queensland Capras	19	11	1	7	1	472	394	+78	25
6	Tweed Heads Seagulls	19	10	1	8	1	474	388	+86	23
7	Brisbane Tigers	19	10	1	8	1	452	454	-2	23
8	Northern Pride	19	9	1	9	1	370	391	-21	21
9	Wynnum Manly Seagulls	19	9	0	10	1	494	422	+72	20
10	Townsville Blackhawks	19	7	2	10	1	445	443	+2	18
11	Mackay Cutters	19	8	0	11	1	444	484	-40	18
12	Papua New Guinea Hunters	19	7	1	11	1	389	531	-142	17
13	Ipswich Jets	19	4	0	15	1	328	712	-384	10
14	Souths Logan Magpies	19	2	1	16	1	346	586	-240	7

== Final series ==
Home	Score	Away	Match Information
Home	Score	Away	Date and Time (Local)	Venue
Qualifying & Elimination Finals
Tweed Heads Seagulls	24 – 18	Brisbane Tigers	3 September 2022, 3:10 pm	Piggabeen Sports Complex
Sunshine Coast Falcons	16 – 22	Redcliffe Dolphins	3 September 2022, 6:00 pm	Sunshine Coast Stadium
Central Queensland Capras	30 – 22	Northern Pride	4 September 2022, 2:15 pm	Browne Park
Burleigh Bears	19 – 20	Norths Devils	4 September 2022, 4:00 pm	Pizzey Park
Semi-finals
Burleigh Bears	32 – 16	Central Queensland Capras	10 September 2022, 4:10 pm	Pizzey Park
Sunshine Coast Falcons	26 – 24	Tweed Heads Seagulls	11 September 2022, 11:00 am	Sunshine Coast Stadium
Preliminary Finals
Norths Devils	20 – 13	Sunshine Coast Falcons	17 September 2022, 1:05 pm	Bishop Park
Redcliffe Dolphins	28 – 16	Burleigh Bears	17 September 2022, 3:10 pm	Moreton Daily Stadium
Grand Final
Redcliffe Dolphins	10 – 16	Norths Devils	24 September 2022, 3:15 pm	Moreton Daily Stadium

Qualifying and elimination finals
QF1: 4 Sept, Pizzey Park
1	Burleigh Bears	19
4	Norths Devils	20
EF1: 4 Sept, Browne Park
5	Central Qld Capras	30
8	Northern Pride	22
EF2: 3 Sept, Piggabeen Sports Complex
6	Tweed Heads Seagulls	24
7	Brisbane Tigers	18
QF2: 3 Sept, Sunshine Coast Stadium
2	Sunshine Coast Falcons	16
3	Redcliffe Dolphins	22

Semi-finals
SF1: 10 Sept, Pizzey Park
Burleigh Bears	32
Central Qld Capras	16
SF2: 11 Sept, Sunshine Coast Stadium
Sunshine Coast Falcons	26
Tweed Heads Seagulls	24

Preliminary finals
PF1: 17 Sept, Bishop Park
Norths Devils	20
Sunshine Coast Falcons	13
PF2: 17 Sept, Moreton Daily Stadium
Redcliffe Dolphins	28
Burleigh Bears	16

Grand final
GF: 24 Sept, Moreton Daily Stadium
Norths Devils	16
Redcliffe Dolphins	10

== Grand Final ==
Saturday, 24 September
3:15pm (AEST) (UTC+10:00)

Redcliffe Dolphins	10 – 16	Norths Devils
Tries: 2 Tu 60'; Burns 72'; Goals: 1 Donovan pen 20' (1/3)	1st: 2–6; 2nd: 8–10; Report; Stats	Tries: 3 McGrady 49', 77'; Gagan 23'; Goals: 2 Roberts 25', 51' (2/3)

Moreton Daily Stadium
Referee: Jarrod Cole
Touch judges: Steve Kanowski, Dan Munroe
Player of the Match: Jacob Gagan (Norths)

Team details
Redcliffe Dolphins		Position	Norths Devils
Name	Number	Position	Number	Name
Trai Fuller	1	Fullback	1	Jack Ahern (c)
Setu Tu	2	Wing	2	Brayden McGrady
Rocco Berry	3	Centre	3	Jacob Gagan
Valynce Te Whare	19	Centre	4	Connor Broadhurst
Edward Burns	5	Wing	5	Tony Tumusa
Bryce Donovan	6	Five eighth	6	Tyson Gamble
Daejarn Asi	23	Half back	7	Tyrone Roberts
Dunamis Lui	8	Prop forward	8	Viko Puliuvea
Sheldon Pitama (c)	20	Hooker	9	Kierran Moseley
Lachlan Timm	10	Prop forward	10	Jayden Stephens
Sam Elliott	11	Second row	11	Brendan Piakura
Jeremiah Simbiken	12	Second row	12	Leivaha Pulu
Pride Petterson-Robati	13	Lock forward	13	Michael Sio
Liam Hampson	9	Interchange	14	Matthew Milson
Jackson Frei	14	Interchange	16	Jerome Veve
Nathan Watts	15	Interchange	19	Liam Horne
Benjamin King	16	Interchange	20	Lloyd Perrett
Garrett Smith	18	Reserve	18	Jayden Corrigan
Scott Murray		Coach		Kevin Neighbour & Ben King

== NRL State Championship ==
As Queensland Cup premiers, the Norths Devils faced NSW Cup premiers Penrith in the NRL State Championship.

Sunday, 2 October
1:35pm (AEDT)

Penrith Panthers
Tries:
J'maine Hopgood 7', 71'

Soni Luke 28'
Eddie Blacker 32'
John Faiumu 45'
Robert Jennings 47'
Luke Sommerton 62'
Sunia Turuva 79'

Goals:
Kurt Falls 9', 29', 34', 63', 72'
(5/7) John Faiumu 80' (1/1)

44 – 10
1st: 18 – 0
2nd: 26 – 10
scorecard

Norths Devils
Tries:

Tony Tumusa 64'
Rashaun Denny 73'

Goals:
Connor Broadhurst 75' (1/2)

Accor Stadium, Sydney
Attendance: 11,115

== QRL awards ==
- Petero Civoniceva Medal (Best and Fairest): Taine Tuaupiki ( Burleigh Bears)
- Coach of the Year: Lionel Harbin ( Central Queensland Capras)
- Rookie of the Year: Taine Tuaupiki ( Burleigh Bears)

=== Team of the Year ===
Position	Nat	Winner	Club
Fullback	(Australia)	Taine Tuaupiki	Burleigh Bears
Wing	(Australia)	Alofiana Khan-Pereira	Burleigh Bears
Centre	(New Zealand)	Valynce Te Whare	Redcliffe Dolphins
Five-eighth	(Australia)	Josh Rogers	Burleigh Bears
Halfback	(Australia)	Guy Hamilton	Burleigh Bears
Prop	(Australia)	Nick Lui-Toso	Northern Pride
Hooker	(Australia)	Tyson Smoothy	Sunshine Coast Falcons
Second-row	(Papua New Guinea)	Nixon Putt	Central Queensland Capras
Lock	(Australia)	Sam Coster	Burleigh Bears

== See also ==
- Queensland Cup
- Queensland Rugby League
