= Sherwin Tanabi =

Papua New Guinea international rugby league footballer

Personal information
- Full name: Sherwin Tanabi
- Born: 5 October 2001 (age 23); Lae, Morobe Province, Papua New Guinea

Playing information
- Position: Second-row
Club
Years	Team	Pld	T	G	FG	P
2022–	PNG Hunters	15	1	0	0	4
Representative
Years	Team	Pld	T	G	FG	P
2022	PNG Prime Minister's XIII	1	0	0	0	0
2022–	Papua New Guinea	1	0	0	0	0
- Source: As of 10 November 2023

Sherwin Tanabi (born 05 October 2001) is a Papua New Guinean professional rugby league footballer who plays as a second-row for the Papua New Guinea Hunters in the Queensland Cup and Papua New Guinea at international level.

== Background ==
Tanabi was born in Morobe Province, Papua New Guinea.

== Playing career ==
=== Club career ===
Tanabi debuted in the 2022 Queensland Cup for the PNG Hunters.

=== International career ===
In 2022 Tanabi was named in the Papua New Guinea squad for the 2021 Rugby League World Cup.

In October 2022 he made his international début for Papua New Guinea against Wales.
