= Dilbert Isaac =

PNG international rugby league footballer

Personal information
- Born: 30 August 1993 (age 32)

Playing information
- Position: Prop
Club
Years	Team	Pld	T	G	FG	P
2018–	PNG Hunters	51	4	0	0	16
Representative
Years	Team	Pld	T	G	FG	P
2017	PNG Prime Minister's XIII	1	0	0	0	0
2022	Papua New Guinea	1	0	0	0	0
- Source: As of 10 November 2023

Dilbert Isaac is a Papua New Guinea international rugby league footballer who plays as a prop for the Papua New Guinea Hunters in the Queensland Cup.

== Career ==
Isaac made his international debut for Papua New Guinea in their 24-14 victory over Fiji in the 2022 Pacific Test.
