= Wesser Tenza =

Papua New Guinea international rugby league footballer

Personal information
- Full name: Wesser Tenza
- Born: 7 December 1996 (age 28); Southern Highlands Province, Papua New Guinea

Playing information
- Position: Hooker
Club
Years	Team	Pld	T	G	FG	P
2022–	PNG Hunters	13	1	0	0	4
Representative
Years	Team	Pld	T	G	FG	P
2022	PNG Prime Minister's XIII	1	0	0	0	0
2022–	Papua New Guinea	1	0	0	0	0
- Source: As of 10 November 2023

Wesser Tenza (born 19 August 1992) is a Papua New Guinean professional rugby league footballer who plays as a hooker for the Papua New Guinea Hunters in the Queensland Cup and Papua New Guinea at international level.

== Background ==
Tenza was born in Southern Highlands Province, Papua New Guinea.

== Playing career ==
=== Club career ===
Tenza debuted in the 2022 Queensland Cup for the PNG Hunters.

=== International career ===
In 2022 Tenza was named in the Papua New Guinea squad for the 2021 Rugby League World Cup.

In October 2022 he made his international début for Papua New Guinea against Wales.
