= Solo Wane =

PNG international rugby league footballer

Personal information
- Born: 23 March 1999 (age 27) Mendi, Southern Highlands Province, Papua New Guinea

Playing information
- Position: Wing
Club
Years	Team	Pld	T	G	FG	P
2021–	PNG Hunters	87	41	0	0	164
Representative
Years	Team	Pld	T	G	FG	P
2022	Papua New Guinea	1	0	0	0	0
- Source: As of 23 July 2025

Solo Wane is a Papua New Guinea international rugby league footballer who plays as a wing for the Papua New Guinea Hunters in the Queensland Cup. He is from Mendi Southern Highlands Province .

== Career ==
Wane made his international debut for Papua New Guinea in their 24-14 victory over Fiji in the 2022 Pacific Test.
