= Rhadley Brawa =

PNG international rugby league footballer

Personal information
- Full name: Rhadley Brawa
- Born: 21 December 1991 (age 33); Papua New Guinea

Playing information
- Position: Second-row, Lock
Club
| Years | Team | Pld | T | G | FG | P |
|---|---|---|---|---|---|---|
| 2017–20 | PNG Hunters | 38 | 1 | 0 | 0 | 4 |
Representative
| Years | Team | Pld | T | G | FG | P |
| 2015–16 | PNG Prime Minister's XIII | 2 | 0 | 0 | 0 | 0 |
| 2018–19 | Papua New Guinea | 2 | 0 | 0 | 0 | 0 |
- As of 10 November 2023

Rhadley Brawa is a Papua New Guinean professional rugby league footballer who played for the PNG Hunters in the Queensland Cup. He has played representative football for Papua New Guinea.
