= Edwin Ipape =

Papua New Guinea international rugby league footballer

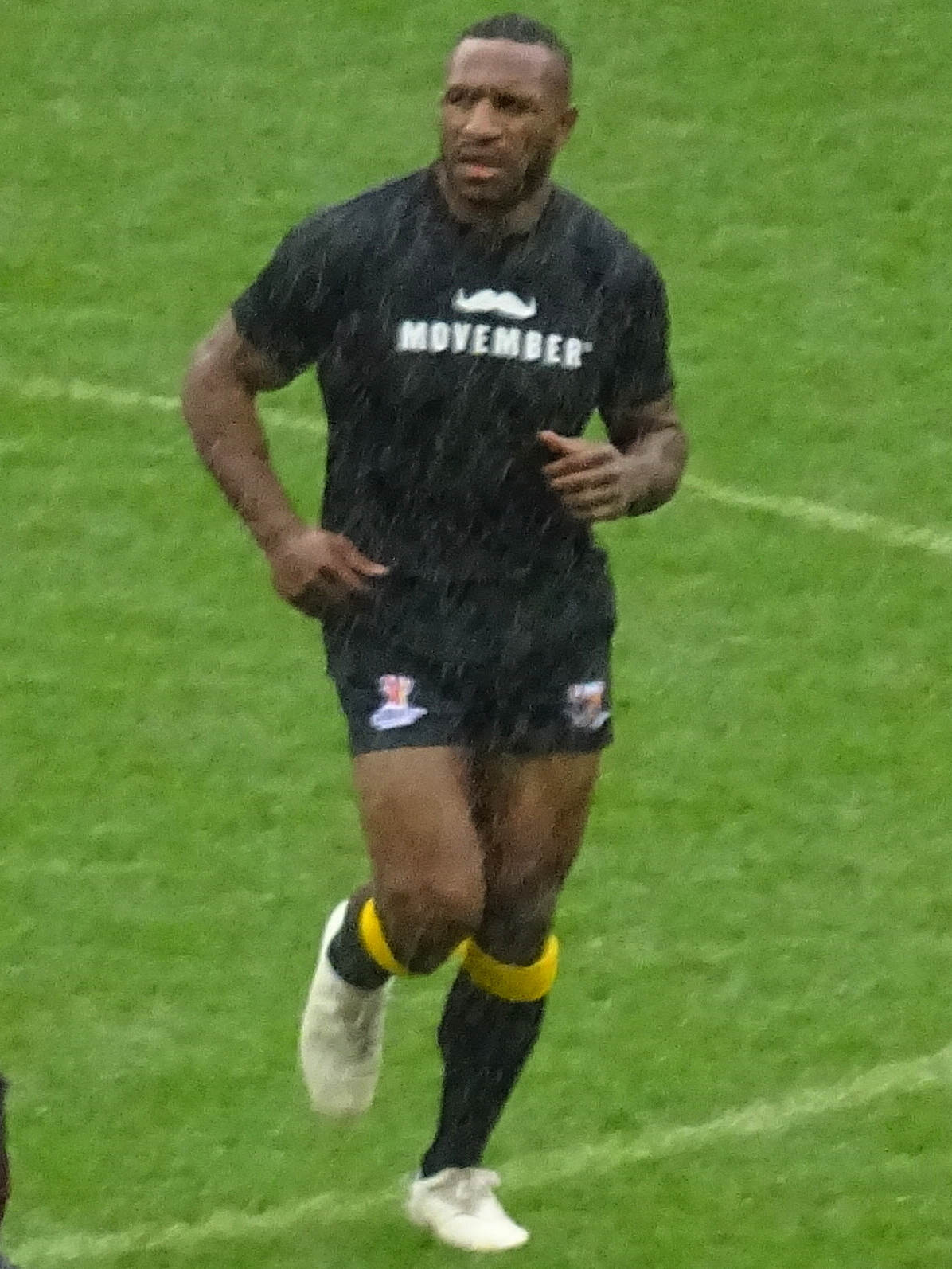

Personal information
- Born: 2 February 1999 (age 27) Mt. Hagen, Papua New Guinea
- Height: 5 ft 9 in (1.75 m)
- Weight: 14 st 5 lb (91 kg)

Playing information
- Position: Hooker
Club
| Years | Team | Pld | T | G | FG | P |
|---|---|---|---|---|---|---|
| 2021 | PNG Hunters | 11 | 3 | 0 | 0 | 12 |
| 2022– | Leigh Leopards | 127 | 49 | 0 | 0 | 196 |
| | Total | 138 | 52 | 0 | 0 | 208 |
Representative
| Years | Team | Pld | T | G | FG | P |
| 2019– | Papua New Guinea | 13 | 3 | 0 | 0 | 12 |
| 2019 | Papua New Guinea 9s | 3 | 0 | 1 | 0 | 2 |
- Source: As of 6 November 2026

Edwin Ipape (born 2 February 1999) is a Papua New Guinean professional rugby league footballer who plays as a hooker or loose forward for the Leigh Leopards in the Super League and Papua New Guinea at international level.

== Career ==
Ipape made his international debut for Papua New Guinea in their 24-6 defeat by Samoa in the 2019 Oceania Cup.

Ipape was on a train and trial contract with the Manly Warringah Sea Eagles as part of their 2020 pre season. He played two games for the Manly 9s team during the NRL 9s.

On 28 May 2022, Ipape played for the Leigh Centurions in their 2022 RFL 1895 Cup final victory over Featherstone Rovers.

On 3 October 2022, Ipape played for the Leigh Centurions in their Million Pound Game victory over the Batley Bulldogs which saw the club promoted back to the Super League.

In October he was named in the Papua New Guinea squad for the 2021 Rugby League World Cup.

In November he was named in the 2021 RLWC Team of the Tournament. On 12 August 2023, Ipape played for Leigh in their 2023 Challenge Cup final victory over Hull Kingston Rovers. It was Leigh's first major trophy in 52 years.

=== 2023 ===
Ipape played 25 games for Leigh in the 2023 Super League season as the club finished fifth on the table and qualified for the playoffs. He played in their elimination playoff loss against Hull Kingston Rovers.

=== 2024 ===
Ipape played 19 games for Leigh in the 2024 Super League season which saw the club finish fifth on the table.

=== 2025 ===
On 24 February 2025, Leigh announced that he had signed a six-year contract extension to remain at Leigh until the end of 2031. Ipape rejected an NRL deal to remain at Leigh. Ipape played 26 games for Leigh in the 2025 Super League season including the clubs semi-final loss to Wigan.

== Statistics ==
| Year | Team | Games | Tries | Pts |
|---|---|---|---|---|
| 2021 | PNG Hunters | 11 | 3 | 12 |
| 2022 | Leigh Leopards | 27 | 23 | 92 |
| 2023 | Leigh Leopards | 28 | 8 | 32 |
| 2024 | Leigh Leopards | 19 | 6 | 28 |
| 2025 | Leigh Leopards | 29 | 7 | 28 |
| 2026 | Leigh Leopards | 24 | 5 | 20 |
| 2027 | Leigh Leopards | | | |
| | Totals | 138 | 52 | 208 |
