= Brandon Nima =

PNG international rugby league footballer

Personal information
- Full name: Brandon Nima
- Born: 21 December 1995 (age 30) Goroka, Papua New Guinea

Playing information
- Position: Centre
Club
Years	Team	Pld	T	G	FG	P
2019–	PNG Hunters	92	38	0	0	152
Representative
Years	Team	Pld	T	G	FG	P
2019	Papua New Guinea	1	0	0	0	0
2022	PNG Prime Minister's XIII	2	1	0	0	4
- As of 16 November 2026

Brandon Nima is a Papua New Guinea international rugby league footballer who plays as a centre for the Papua New Guinea Hunters in the Queensland Cup. He was the vice captain for the PNG Hunters team for the 2022 season. His wife, Belinda Gwasamun plays as a centre for the Papua New Guinea Orchids and Norths Devils in the QRL.

== Career ==
Nima made his international debut for Papua New Guinea as 18th man in their 24-6 defeat by Samoa in the 2019 Oceania Cup.
