= Rodrick Tai =

PNG international rugby league footballer

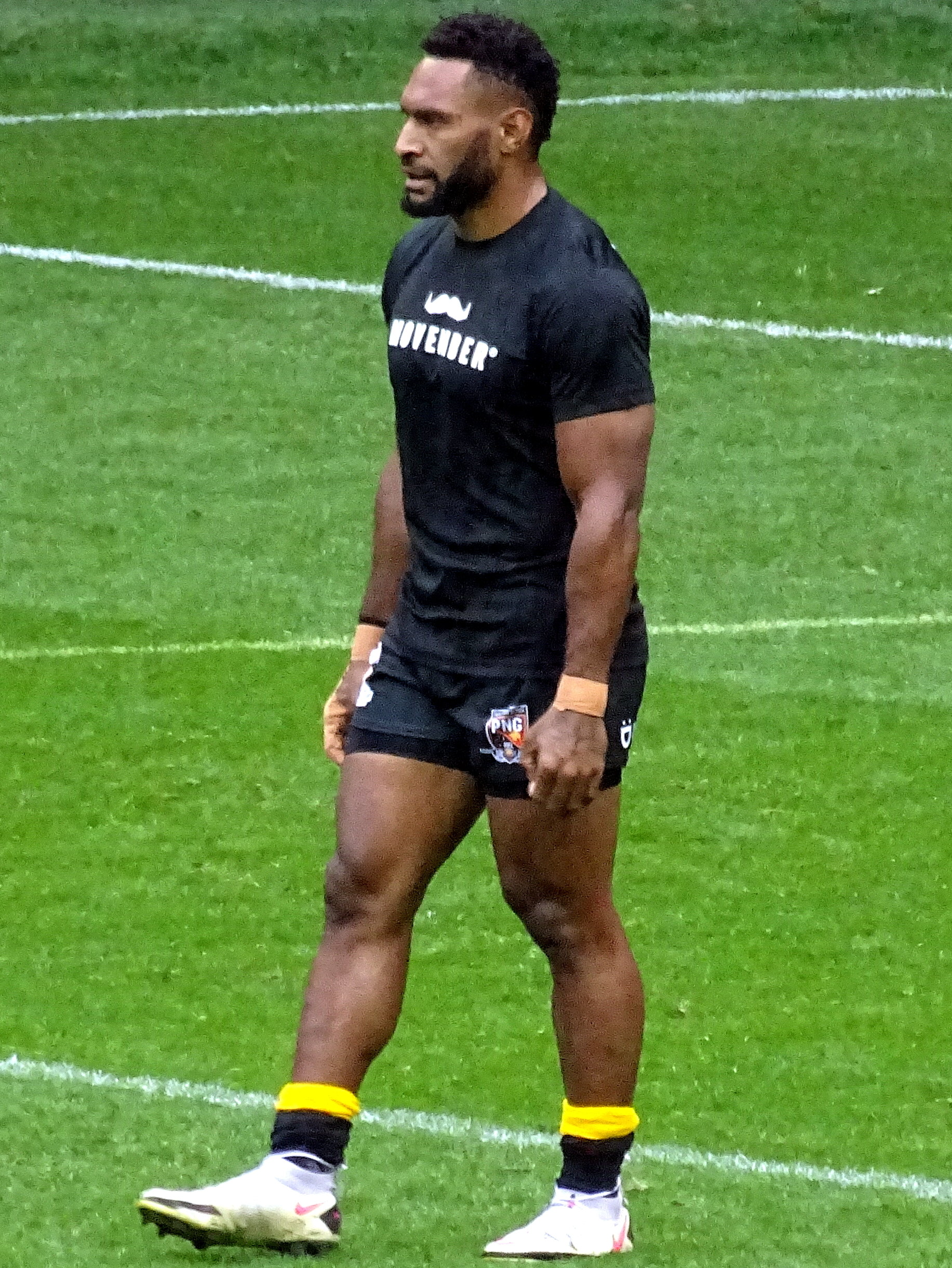

Personal information
- Born: 21 December 1998 (age 27) Mt. Hagen, Western Highlands Province, Papua New Guinea
- Height: 182 cm (6 ft 0 in)
- Weight: 94 kg (14 st 11 lb)

Playing information
- Position: Centre, Wing, Second-row
Club
Years	Team	Pld	T	G	FG	P
2022–23	PNG Hunters	34	14	0	0	56
2024–25	Warrington Wolves	41	13	0	0	52
2025(DR)	→Widnes Vikings	1	0	0	0	0
2026–	Central Queensland Capras	0	0	0	0	0
	Total	76	27	0	0	108
Representative
Years	Team	Pld	T	G	FG	P
2022	PNG Prime Minister's XIII	1	0	0	0	0
2022–	Papua New Guinea	10	2	0	0	8
- Source: As of 24 October 2026

Rodrick Tai is a Papua New Guinean professional rugby league footballer who plays as a centre for Central Queensland Capras in the Queensland Cup and for Papua New Guinea at international level.

He previously played for the Warrington Wolves in the Super League.

== Early life ==
Rodrick Tai was born in Mt Hagen and raised in Kuk, a small village in the Mt Hagen Central District of Western Highlands Province, Papua New Guinea.

Due to his father being transferred to work from Mt Hagen to Wabag in 2012, Tai and his siblings including the parents had to leave Mt Hagen and went up to Wabag, Enga Province to attend school while his parents working there. His father was the Airport Manager and managed Wapanamanda Airport and his mom is a Nursing Officer worked at Wabag General Hospital. However, the family returned to their native Western Highlands after Two years due to his father being transferred back to manage Kagamuga Airport in Mt Hagen.

Tai was educated at Tarangau Primary School and attended Mt Hagen Secondary School in (Western Highlands Province) and he went on to the Papua New Guinea University of Technology in Lae Morobe Province where he graduated with a Bachelor's Degree in Applied Physics in 2021. Whilst studying for his degree, Tai began playing rugby league for the Unitech Spartans in the PNG Universities competition and later went on to play for the Lae Snax Tigers Academy Team in 2017.

== Playing career ==
=== 2019 ===
In 2019, during his second year at the Papua New Guinea University of Technology, he went on and made his Digicel Cup debut playing for the Lae Snax Tigers in the Papua New Guinea National Rugby League competition. From 2019 to 2021, Tai played in the Digicel Cup in the Papua New Guinea National Rugby League and won back to back Grand Finals with the Lae Snax Tigers in 2019 and 2020 Season and fall short in the following Season 2021.

=== 2022 ===
After impressive performance in the Digicel Cup for the Lae Snax Tigers, he was signed by the PNG Hunters for the 2022 Queensland Cup season. After impressive performance in the Queensland Cup, Tai was selected in the 24-man squad for the delayed 2021 Rugby League World Cup. Tai went on and made his international debut, playing on the Wing for Papua New Guinea in their 24–18 loss to Tonga in the 2021 Rugby League World Cup. He played in all the matches and scored two tries in the tournament, both against Cook Islands. With a successful 2022 campaign, Tai was offered an 8-weeks Train and Trial deal by the newly formed Dolphins in the NRL for the 2023 season.

=== 2023 ===
In 2023, after completing his 8 weeks Train and Trail with the Dolphins, Tai returned and played every game for the PNG Hunters in Queensland Cup competition. At the end of the year he was selected for the Papua New Guinea Kumuls for the 2023 Pacific Bowl. After impressive performances in the Pacific Tests, Tai was signed by the Warrington Wolves in the Super League for the 2024 season and a Club Option for 2025. Incoming Warrington head coach Sam Burgess said: "I’m very excited that Rodrick is joining us at Warrington. He has been fantastic in the Queensland Cup this year and also when representing PNG in recent years." Wire director of rugby Gary Chambers added: "With Rodrick we’ve got an explosive and dynamic centre who can break lines and is a threat with the ball." “He’s played at international level and to get someone of his calibre coming to us at the right age is going to add the right value to what we’re building. He’s an exciting proposition for us. Tai becomes Warrington’s second new signing for 2024. “I’m very excited," Tai said. "It's a huge move for me to be joining a great club in Warrington. Sam Burgess called me and said there's an opportunity, even him calling was huge for me! I'm looking forward now to giving my all in pre-season, working hard and playing my part next year 2024. During the World Cup with PNG we stayed in Warrington so there'll be some familiarities there for me. It was a great experience for us Kumuls and myself and my family can't wait to come back over to the town, said Tai.

=== 2024 ===
In round six of the Super League season, Tai made his debut in the centres and scored a try in the Challenge Cup against the London Broncos. Warrington went on to win the game 42–0. On 8 June, Tai played in Warrington's 2024 Challenge Cup final defeat against Wigan.

=== 2025 ===
On 28 February, it was reported that he had signed for rivals Widnes in the RFL Championship on DR loan. On 7 June, he played in Warrington's 8-6 Challenge Cup final loss against Hull Kingston Rovers.

On 30 October 2025 it was reported that he had been released by Warrington Wolves to re-join the Vikings

On 14 November 2025 it was reported that he had joined Central Queensland Capras in the Queensland Cup for 2026
