= Terry Wapi =

PNG international rugby league footballer

Personal information
- Born: 30 August 1996 (age 30)

Playing information
- Position: Wing, Fullback
Club
| Years | Team | Pld | T | G | FG | P |
|---|---|---|---|---|---|---|
| 2019– | PNG Hunters | 30 | 18 | 0 | 0 | 48 |
Representative
| Years | Team | Pld | T | G | FG | P |
| 2019 | Papua New Guinea | 2 | 1 | 0 | 0 | 4 |
| 2019– | Papua New Guinea 9s | 2 | 0 | 0 | 0 | 0 |
- Source: As of 27 April 2021

Terry Wapi is a Papua New Guinea international rugby league footballer who plays as a wing, fullback for the Papua New Guinea Hunters in the Queensland Cup.

== Career ==
Wapi made his international debut for Papua New Guinea in their 24-6 defeat by Samoa in the 2019 Oceania Cup.
