= Emmanuel Waine =

PNG international rugby league footballer

Manu Waine
Personal information
- Full name: Emmanuel Waine
- Born: 6 October 1996 (age 30) Jiwaka Province, Papua New Guinea
- Height: 5 ft 11 in (1.80 m)
- Weight: 15 st 10 lb (100 kg)

Playing information
- Position: Second-row
Club
Years	Team	Pld	T	G	FG	P
2021–22	PNG Hunters	26	6	0	0	24
2023–24	London Broncos	23	3	0	0	12
2025	Bradford Bulls	8	0	0	0	0
2025(loan)	→ Hunslet	1	0	0	0	0
2025(loan)	→ London Broncos	2	0	0	0	0
2025(loan)	→ Batley Bulldogs	2	1	0	0	4
2025(loan)	→ Salford Red Devils	2	0	0	0	0
2026	Oldham	3	1	0	0	4
2026	→ Keighley Cougars (loan)	7	5	0	0	20
	Total	74	16	0	0	64
Representative
Years	Team	Pld	T	G	FG	P
2022	PNG Prime Minister's XIII	1	0	0	0	0
2022	Papua New Guinea	3	0	0	0	0
- Source: As of 14 October 2026

Emmanuel Waine (born 6 October 1996) is a Papua New Guinean professional rugby league footballer who last played as a second-row, lock and centre for Oldham in the RFL Championship. He plays for Papua New Guinea at international level.

== Career ==
Waine made his international debut for Papua New Guinea in their 24–14 victory over Fiji in the 2022 Pacific Test. On 15 October 2023, Waine played in the London Broncos upset Million Pound Game victory over Toulouse Olympique.

=== Bradford Bulls ===
On 16 August 2024 it was reported that he had signed for Bradford Bulls in the RFL Championship on a 2-year deal.

=== Hunslet RLFC (loan) ===
On 8 March 2025 it was reported that he had signed for Hunslet RLFC in the RFL Championship on loan

=== London Broncos (loan) ===
On 25 April 2025 it was reported that he had signed for London Broncos in the RFL Championship on short-term loan

=== Batley Bulldogs (loan) ===
On 1 August 2025 it was reported that he had signed for Batley Bulldogs in the RFL Championship on loan

=== Salford Red Devils (loan) ===
On 21 August 2025 it was reported that he had signed for Salford Red Devils in the Super League on 1-month loan

=== Oldham RLFC ===
On 27 November 2025 it was reported that he had signed for Oldham RLFC in the RFL Championship on a 1-year deal.

=== Keighley Cougars (loan) ===
On 20 March 2026 it was reported that he had signed for Keighley Cougars in the RFL Championship on season-long loan
