= Junior Rau =

PNG international rugby league footballer

Personal information
- Born: 23 October 1995 (age 29); Chimbu Province, Papua New Guinea
- Height: 170 cm (5 ft 7 in)
- Weight: 73 kg (11 st 7 lb)

Playing information
- Position: Wing
Club
Years	Team	Pld	T	G	FG	P
2018–	PNG Hunters	50	16	0	0	64
Representative
Years	Team	Pld	T	G	FG	P
2015	PNG Prime Minister's XIII	1	0	0	0	0
2018–19	Papua New Guinea	2	2	0	0	8
- Source: https://www.qrl.com.au/players/intrust-super-cup/papua-new-guinea-hunters/junior-rau/ As of 10 November 2023

Junior Rau is a professional Papua New Guinean rugby league footballer who plays as a wing for the PNG Hunters in the Queensland Cup and made his international debut against the Fiji Bati during the 2018 Pacific Rugby League Test in Sydney in June 2018 scoring twice in the Kumuls 26-14 victory.

Rau had previously played for the Mt Hagen Eagles in the Papua New Guinea National Rugby League, captaining the side in 2016 to a semi-final loss to the Agmark Rabaul Gurias. As a result of a post-match fight between several players, officials, and a referee that led to thousands of dollars in damages to facilities at Sir John Guise Stadium, Rau was given a ten year suspension from the PNGNRL.
