= 2019 Townsville Blackhawks season =

- Queensland Cup Rank: 4th
- Play-off result: Lost preliminary final
- 2019 record: Wins: 17; draws: 0; losses: 6
- Points scored: For: 566; against: 344

Team information
- CEO: Justin Wilkins
- Coach: Aaron Payne
- Captain: Sam Hoare
- Stadium: Jack Manski Oval

Top scorers
- Tries: Kalifa Faifai Loa (13)
- Goals: Shaun Nona (60)
- Points: Shaun Nona (124)
← 2018	2020 →

The 2019 Townsville Blackhawks season was the fifth in the club's history. Coached by Aaron Payne and captained by Sam Hoare, they competed in the Intrust Super Cup. Payne, a former North Queensland Cowboys player and Townsville junior, took over as head coach from Kristian Woolf, who joined the Newcastle Knights as an assistant coach.

== Season summary ==
=== Milestones ===
- Round 1: Tom Gilbert, Ryan Lloyd and Shaun Nona made their debuts for the club.
- Round 1: Tom Gilbert scored his first try for the club.
- Round 1: Aaron Payne recorded his first win as head coach.
- Round 3: Sam Murphy and Nathan Traill made their debuts for the club.
- Round 4: Tom Opacic made his debut for the club.
- Round 5: Murray Taulagi made his debut for the club.
- Round 5: Joe Boyce scored his first try for the club.
- Round 6: Wiremu Greig and Jayden Stephens made their debuts for the club.
- Round 8: Josh Chudleigh made his debut for the club.
- Round 9: Chippie Korostchuk made his debut for the club.
- Round 9: Josh Chudleigh scored his first try for the club.
- Round 15: Cody Maughan made his debut for the club.
- Round 15: Nathan Traill scored his first try for the club.
- Round 16: Michael Bell made his debut for the club.
- Round 16: Shaun Nona scored his first try for the club.
- Round 17: Michael Bell scored his first try for the club.
- Round 21: Daejarn Asi made his debut for the club.
- Round 21: Daejarn Asi scored his first try for the club.
- Round 22: Nathan Barrett made his debut for the club.
- Finals Week 1: Campbell Duffy made his debut for the club.
- Finals Week 1: Nathan Barrett scored his first try for the club.

== 2019 squad ==
Townsville Blackhawks
First team squad			Coaching staff
Daniel Beasley – PR; Joe Boyce – LK; Michael Carroll – WG; Josh Chudleigh – HK; Adam Cook – HB; Campbell Duffy – LK; Kalifa Faifai Loa – WG; Jaelen Feeney – FE, HB; Krys Freeman – HK; Jack Glossop – LK; Rod Griffin – PR	Sam Hoare (c) – PR; Marshall Hudson – FB; Shaun Hudson – CE; Chippie Korostchuk – SR; Kyle Laybutt – HB, FE; Ryan Lloyd – SR; Sione Lousi – PR; Cade Maloney – PR; Jake Marketo – SR; Sam Martin-Savage – FE; Cody Maughan – CE	Tom McCagh – WG, CE; Andrew Niemoeller – LK; Shaun Nona – FE; Michael Parker-Walshe – HB; Temone Power – LK; Kieran Quabba – LK; Bacho Salam – WG; Zac Santo – FB; Jayden Stephens – PR; Nathan Traill – WG, FB	Head coach: Aaron Payne; Assistant coaches: Allan Peterson (assistant coach); John Crawley (head trainer); Adrian Thomson (team manager); Jason Tassell (trainer); Christian Quabba (trainer); Daniel Strickland (trainer); Legend: (c) Captain(s); (vc) Vice-captain(s); Updated: 22 February 2019; Source(s): Blackhawks

== Squad movement ==
=== Gains ===
Player	Signed from	Until End of	Notes
Josh Chudleigh	North Queensland Cowboys	2019	
Sam Hoare	North Queensland Cowboys	2019	
Shaun Hudson	North Queensland Cowboys	2019	
Chippie Korostchuk	Western Lions	2019	
Kyle Laybutt	North Queensland Cowboys	2019	
Ryan Lloyd	Townsville Brothers	2019	
Shaun Nona	Wynnum Manly Seagulls	2019	
Michael Parker-Walshe	Townsville Brothers	2019	
Nathan Traill	Centrals ASA	2019	

=== Losses ===
Player	Signed from	Until End of	Notes
Ross Bella	Mackay Cutters	2019	
Paul Byrnes	Mackay Cutters	2019	
Ty Carucci	Townsville Brothers	2019	
Davin Crampton	Western Lions	2019	
Andrew Davey	Parramatta Eels	2019	
Levi Dodd	South Sydney Rabbitohs (mid-season)	2019	
Jordan Drew	Wynnum Manly Seagulls	2019	
Zach Dockar-Clay	Blacktown Workers Sea Eagles	2019	
Sam Foster	Easts Tigers	2019	
Jordan Kenworthy	Mackay Cutters	2019	
David Munro	Mackay Cutters	2019	
Jonathon Reuben	Sunshine Coast Falcons	2019	
Brenden Santi	Toulouse Olympique	2019	
Solomon Vasuvulagi	Released (mid-season)	2019	

== Fixtures ==
=== Pre-season ===
Date	Round	Opponent	Venue	Score	Tries	Goals
Saturday, 23 February	Round 1	Northern Pride	Alley Park	10 – 28	–	–
Saturday, 2 March	Round 2	Mackay Cutters	BB Print Stadium	26 – 18	–	–
Legend: Win Loss Draw Bye

=== Regular season ===
Date	Round	Opponent	Venue	Score	Tries	Goals
Saturday, 9 March	Round 1	Ipswich Jets	North Ipswich Reserve	34 – 6	Faifai Loa (2), Hudson (2), Freeman, Gilbert	Nona (4), Faifai Loa (1)
Sunday, 17 March	Round 2	Tweed Heads Seagulls	Piggabeen Sports Complex	16 – 24	Dodd, Hudson, Parker-Walshe	Dodd (1), Nona (1)
Saturday, 23 March	Round 3	Northern Pride	Barlow Park	20 – 4	Carroll, Gilbert, Power	Dodd (4)
Sunday, 31 March	Round 4	Burleigh Bears	Jack Manski Oval	16 – 10	Freeman, Hudson, Marketo	Faifai Loa (2)
Friday, 5 April	Round 5	Mackay Cutters	Jack Manski Oval	6 – 20	Boyce	Faifai Loa (1)
Saturday, 13 April	Round 6	Redcliffe Dolphins	Jack Manski Oval	36 – 6	O'Neill (2), Freeman, Gilbert, Opacic, Taulagi	Dodd (5), Faifai Loa (1)
Saturday, 20 April	Round 7	Norths Devils	Bishop Park	10 – 22	Faifai Loa, Gilbert	Faifai Loa (1)
Saturday, 27 April	Round 8	CQ Capras	Jack Manski Oval	40 – 4	Santo (3), Faifai Loa, Jensen, Marketo, Power, Salam	Dodd (2), Faifai Loa (2)
Sunday, 5 May	Round 9	PNG Hunters	National Football Stadium	24 – 14	Santo (2), Chudleigh, Faifai Loa	Dodd (4)
Sunday, 19 May	Round 10	Sunshine Coast Falcons	Jack Manski Oval	10 – 34	Carroll, Power	Nona (1)
Saturday, 25 May	Round 11	Easts Tigers	Jack Manski Oval	30 – 6	Carroll, Jensen, Laybutt, Marketo, Salam, Santo	Nona (3)
Saturday, 1 June	Round 12	Wynnum Manly Seagulls	Kougari Oval	12 – 28	Carroll, Power	Nona (2)
Sunday, 9 June	Round 13	Souths Logan Magpies	Davies Park	28 – 14	Chudleigh (2), Carroll, Faifai Loa, Power	Nona (4)
Saturday, 15 June	Round 14	Ipswich Jets	Jack Manski Oval	14 – 6	Boyce, Carroll	Nona (3)
Saturday, June 29	Round 15	Tweed Heads Seagulls	Jack Manski Oval	24 – 22	Faifai Loa, Feeney, Freeman, Traill	Nona (4)
Friday, 5 July	Round 16	Mackay Cutters	BB Print Stadium	22 – 6	Salam (2), Nona, Power	Nona (3)
Saturday, 13 July	Round 17	Northern Pride	Jack Manski Oval	60 – 6	Bell (2), Chudleigh (2), Faifai Loa (2), Power (2), Feeney, Marketo, Salam	Nona (7), Laybutt (1)
Sunday, 21 July	Round 18	Burleigh Bears	A.R. Gofton Oval	22 – 10	Bell, Chudleigh, Faifai Loa, Salam	Laybutt (3)
Saturday, 3 August	Round 19	PNG Hunters	Jack Manski Oval	48 – 18	Faifai Loa, Maloney, Marketo, Power, Salam, Santo, Traill	Nona (8)
Saturday, 10 August	Round 20	CQ Capras	Browne Park	32 – 6	Feeney (3), Faifai Loa, Salam	Nona (6)
Saturday, 17 August	Round 21	Sunshine Coast Falcons	Sunshine Coast Stadium	18 – 40	Asi, Marketo, Traill	Nona (3)
Saturday, 24 August	Round 22	Wynnum Manly Seagulls	Jack Manski Oval	22 – 18	Chudleigh, Faifai Loa, Salam, Santo	Nona (3)
Saturday, August 31	Round 23	Easts Tigers	Suzuki Stadium	22 – 20	Beasley, Feeney, Gilbert, Power	Nona (3)
Legend: Win Loss Draw Bye

=== Finals ===
Date	Round	Opponent	Venue	Score	Tries	Goals
Sunday, 8 September	Qualifying Final	Sunshine Coast Falcons	Sunshine Coast Stadium	20 – 12	Feeney (2), Barrett, Traill	Nona (2)
Saturday, 21 September	Preliminary Final	Wynnum Manly Seagulls	Jack Manski Oval	14 – 26	Chudleigh, Salam	Nona (3)
Legend: Win Loss Draw Bye

== Statistics ==
*	Denotes player contracted to the North Queensland Cowboys for the 2019 season

Name	App	T	G	FG	Pts
Daejarn Asi*	3	1	-	-	4
Nathan Barrett*	3	1	-	-	4
Daniel Beasley	8	1	-	-	4
Michael Bell*	3	3	-	-	12
Joe Boyce	23	2	-	-	8
Michael Carroll	10	6	-	-	24
Josh Chudleigh	18	8	-	-	32
Levi Dodd	9	1	16	-	36
Campbell Duffy	2	-	-	-	-
Kalifa Faifai Loa	25	13	8	-	68
Jaelen Feeney	12	8	-	-	32
Krys Freeman	24	4	-	-	16
Tom Gilbert*	24	5	-	-	20
Wiremu Greig*	6	-	-	-	-
Rod Griffin	5	-	-	-	-
Sam Hoare	9	-	-	-	-
Shaun Hudson	6	4	-	-	16
Corey Jensen*	17	2	-	-	8
Chippie Korostchuk	1	-	-	-	-
Kyle Laybutt	22	2	4	-	16
Ryan Lloyd	2	-	-	-	-
Sione Lousi	13	-	-	-	-
Cade Maloney	2	1	-	-	4
Jake Marketo	22	6	-	-	24
Sam Martin-Savage	1	-	-	-	-
Cody Maughan	1	-	-	-	-
Francis Molo*	1	-	-	-	-
Sam Murphy*	3	-	-	-	-
Andrew Niemoeller	1	-	-	-	-
Shaun Nona	19	1	60	-	124
Justin O'Neill*	3	2	-	-	8
Tom Opacic*	4	1	-	-	4
Michael Parker-Walshe	14	1	-	-	4
Temone Power	25	10	-	-	40
Kieran Quabba	24	-	-	-	-
Bacho Salam	17	10	-	-	40
Zac Santo	18	8	-	-	32
Jayden Stephens	2	-	-	-	-
Murray Taulagi*	8	1	-	-	4
Nathan Traill	15	4	-	-	16
Totals		106	88	0	600

== Honours ==
=== Club ===
- Player of the Year: Tom Gilbert
- Players' Player: Temone Power
- Back of the Year: Kyle Laybutt
- Forward of the Year: Temone Power
- Under 20 Player of the Year: Adam Cook
- Under 18 Player of the Year: Hamiso Tabuai-Fidow
