= 2021 Townsville Blackhawks season =

- Queensland Cup Rank: 7th
- Play-off result: Lost Elimination Final
- 2021 record: Wins: 9; draws: 1; losses: 7
- Points scored: For: 468; against: 361

Team information
- CEO: Justin Wilkins
- Coach: Aaron Payne
- Captain: Sam Hoare
- Stadium: Jack Manski Oval

Top scorers
- Tries: Kalifa Faifai Loa (12)
- Goals: Shaun Nona (50)
- Points: Shaun Nona (108)
← 2020	2022 →

The 2021 Townsville Blackhawks season was the seventh in the club's history. Coached by Aaron Payne and captained by Sam Hoare, they competed in the Intrust Super Cup.

The 2021 season marked the return of the Blackhawks after the 2020 season was cancelled after just one round due to the COVID-19 pandemic.

== Season summary ==
=== Milestones ===
- Round 1: Tom Hancock, Patrick Kaufusi, Cameron King and Griffin Neame made their debuts for the club.
- Round 1: Griffin Neame scored his first try for the club.
- Round 3: Esan Marsters and Riley Price made their debuts for the club.
- Round 3: Josh Hoffman and Esan Marsters scored their first tries for the club.
- Round 7: Benn Campagnolo made his debut for the club.
- Round 7: Benn Campagnolo scored his first try for the club.
- Round 9: Luke Geary, Jordan Lipp, Cody Maughan and Aaron Moore made their debuts for the club.
- Round 9: Luke Geary and Moses Meninga scored their first tries for the club.
- Round 10: Patrick Kaufusi scored his first try for the club.
- Round 13: Nick Brown made his debut for the club.
- Round 13: Sam Murphy scored his first try for the club.

== 2021 squad ==
Townsville Blackhawks
First team squad			Coaching Staff
Carlin Anderson – FB, WG; Nathan Barrett – SR; Michael Bell – CE; Joe Boyce – PR, LK; Nick Brown – PR; Benn Campagnolo – WG, CE; Michael Carroll – WG; Josh Chudleigh – HK; Kalifa Faifai Loa – WG; Jaelen Feeney – HB	Luke Geary – WG, CE; Tom Hancock – PR; Sam Hoare (c) – PR; Josh Hoffman – FB, WG; Patrick Kaufusi – PR; Jordan Kenworthy – LK; Cameron King – HK; Kyle Laybutt – FE, HB; Sione Lousi – PR; Sam Martin-Savage – FE, HB	Cody Maughan – CE; Moses Meninga – PR, LK; Aaron Moore – HB; Sam Murphy – HK, LK; Andrew Niemoeller – LK, SR; Shaun Nona – FE, HB; Kieran Quabba – LK; Bacho Salam – CE, WG	Head coach: Aaron Payne; Assistant coaches: Allan Petersen (Assistant coach); Adrian Thomson (Team Manager); Matthew Ham (Strength & Conditioning coach); Christian Quabba (Strength & Conditioning coach); Daniel Strickland (Strength & Conditioning coach); Legend: (c) Captain(s); (vc) Vice-captain(s); Updated: 11 March 2021; Source(s): Blackhawks

== Squad movement ==
=== Gains ===
Player	Signed From	Until End of	Notes
Michael Bell	North Queensland Cowboys (mid-season)	2022	
Nick Brown	Redcliffe Dolphins	2021	
Luke Geary	St Marys Saints (mid-season)	2021	
Jordan Kenworthy	Mackay Cutters	2021	
Cameron King	Cronulla-Sutherland Sharks	2021	
Shaun Nona	Limoux Grizzlies	2021	

=== Losses ===
Player	Signed To	Until End of	Notes
Krys Freeman	Released	–	
Jake Marketo	Released	–	
Harry Mulligan	Released	–	
Temone Power	Year off	–	
Lachlan Taylor	Released	–	
Nathan Traill	Released	–	

== Fixtures ==
=== Pre-season ===
Date	Round	Opponent	Venue	Score	Tries	Goals
Saturday, 27 February	Trial 1	Northern Pride	Jack Manski Oval	6 – 34	Quabba	Asi (1)
Saturday, 6 March	Trial 2	Mackay Cutters	BB Print Stadium	24 – 18	Hancock, Kenworthy, Laybutt, Murphy, Salam	Asi (2)
Legend: Win Loss Draw Bye

=== Regular season ===
Due COVID-19 lockdowns and restrictions in Queensland throughout the season, Round 12 was postponed and played after Rounds 13 and 14. Rounds 15 and 18 were cancelled and Rounds 16 and 17 were postponed and played after Round 19.

Date	Round	Opponent	Venue	Score	Tries	Goals
Saturday, 20 March	Round 1	Ipswich Jets	North Ipswich Reserve	46 – 12	Chudleigh (3), Boyce, Hoare, Laybutt, Neame, Salam	Asi (7)
Sunday, 28 March	Round 2	Brisbane Tigers	Jack Manski Oval	30 – 0	Anderson (2), Faifai Loa (2), Boyce	Nona (4), Anderson (1)
Saturday, 10 April	Round 3	Norths Devils	Bishop Park	22 – 30	Marsters (2), Anderson, Hoffman	Nona (2), Anderson (1)
Saturday, 17 April	Round 4	Northern Pride	Jack Manski Oval	26 – 30	Marsters (2), Chudleigh, Faifai Loa, Nona	Nona (2), Anderson (1)
Sunday, 25 April	Round 5	Sunshine Coast Falcons	Jack Manski Oval	16 – 24	Barrett (2), Anderson	Nona (2)
Sunday, 9 May	Round 6	Redcliffe Dolphins	Moreton Daily Stadium	24 – 26	Faifai Loa (2), Anderson, Caroll, Neame	Nona (2)
Sunday, 16 May	Round 7	Mackay Cutters	Jack Manski Oval	24 – 18	Faifai Loa (2), Barrett, Campagnolo, Laybutt	Anderson (2)
Saturday, 29 May	Round 8	Burleigh Bears	Pizzey Park	18 – 22	Barrett (2), Carroll	Nona (3)
Saturday, 5 June	Round 9	PNG Hunters	Bycroft Oval	38 – 28	Geary (3), Barrett, Carroll, Feeney, Meninga	Nona (5)
Saturday, 12 June	Round 10	CQ Capras	Jack Manski Oval	48 – 16	Kaufusi (3), Carroll (2), Jensen (2), Faifai Loa, Martin-Savage	Nona (6)
Saturday, 19 June	Round 11	Sunshine Coast Falcons	Sunshine Coast Stadium	18 – 16	Feeney (2), Carroll, Salam	Nona (1)
Saturday, 10 July	Round 13	Northern Pride	Barlow Park	30 – 26	Hoare, Kaufusi, Kenworthy, Murphy, Salam	Nona (5)
Saturday, 17 July	Round 14	Souths Logan Magpies	Charlie Wehlow Oval	28 – 18	Anderson, Faifai Loa, Hoffman, Laybutt, Nona, Salam	Nona (2)
Sunday, 25 July	Round 12	Norths Devils	Jack Manski Oval	22 – 29	Anderson, Kaufusi, Lousi, Martin-Savage	Faifai-Loa (1), Laybutt (1), Nona (1)
Saturday, 31 July	Round 15	Ipswich Jets	Jack Manski Oval		Cancelled	
Saturday, 21 August	Round 18	Redcliffe Dolphins	Jack Manski Oval		Cancelled	
Saturday, 28 August	Round 19	Mackay Cutters	BB Print Stadium	28 – 10	Bell, Faifai-Loa, Feeney, Hoffman, Laybutt	Nona (4)
Saturday, 4 September	Round 16	Tweed Heads Seagulls	Piggabeen Sports Complex	26 – 26	Feeney, Hoffman, Price, Salam	Nona (5)
Saturday, 11 September	Round 17	Wynnum Manly Seagulls	Jack Manski Oval	24 – 30	Carroll, Chudleigh, Faifai-Loa, Price	Anderson (2), Nona (2)
Legend: Win Loss Draw Bye

=== Finals ===
Date	Round	Opponent	Venue	Score	Tries	Goals
Sunday, 19 September	Elimination Final	Souths Logan Magpies	Marsden State High School	24 – 30	Chudleigh, Faifai-Loa, Feeney, Laybutt	Nona (4)
Legend: Win Loss Draw Bye

== Statistics ==
*	Denotes player contracted to the North Queensland Cowboys for the 2021 season

Name	App	T	G	FG	Pts
Carlin Anderson	14	7	7	-	28
Daejarn Asi*	4	-	7	-	14
Nathan Barrett	8	6	-	-	24
Michael Bell	5	1	-	-	4
Joe Boyce	15	2	-	-	8
Nick Brown	3	–	-	-	–
Benn Campagnolo	2	1	-	-	4
Michael Carroll	14	7	-	-	28
Josh Chudleigh	15	6	-	-	24
Kalifa Faifai Loa	16	12	1	-	50
Jaelen Feeney	13	6	-	-	24
Luke Geary	3	3	-	-	12
Tom Gilbert*	4	-	-	-	-
Tom Hancock	9	-	-	-	-
Sam Hoare	17	2	-	-	8
Josh Hoffman	12	4	-	-	16
Corey Jensen*	7	7	-	-	28
Patrick Kaufusi	13	5	-	-	20
Jordan Kenworthy	14	1	-	-	4
Cameron King	4	-	-	-	-
Kyle Laybutt	14	5	1	-	22
Jordan Lipp*	1	-	-	-	-
Sione Lousi	17	1	-	-	4
Esan Marsters*	3	4	-	-	16
Sam Martin-Savage	5	1	-	-	4
Cody Maughan	1	-	-	-	-
Moses Meninga	2	1	-	-	4
Aaron Moore	6	-	-	-	-
Sam Murphy	9	1	-	-	4
Griffin Neame*	8	2	-	-	8
Shaun Nona	17	2	50	-	108
Justin O'Neill*	2	-	-	-	-
Riley Price*	8	2	-	-	8
Kieran Quabba	12	-	-	-	-
Bacho Salam	9	5	-	-	20
Totals		90	66	0	492

== Honours ==
=== Club ===
- Player of the Year: Josh Chudleigh
- Players' Player: Josh Chudleigh
- Back of the Year: Jaelen Feeney
- Forward of the Year: Josh Chudleigh
- Under 20 Player of the Year: Jake Bourke
- Under 19 Player of the Year: Jordii-Rae Mahendrarajah
- Under 18 Player of the Year: Will Latu
- Under 16 Player of the Year: Jamal Shibasaki
