= 2020 Townsville Blackhawks season =

Team information
- CEO: Justin Wilkins
- Coach: Aaron Payne
- Captain: Sam Hoare
- Stadium: Jack Manski Oval

Top scorers
- Tries: Daejarn Asi; Jake Marketo (1)
- Goals: Kyle Laybutt (2)
- Points: Three players (4)
← 2019	2021 →

The 2020 Townsville Blackhawks season was the sixth in the club's history. Coached by Aaron Payne and captained by Sam Hoare, they competed in the Intrust Super Cup. The Blackhawks played just one game in 2020 after the season was cancelled due to the COVID-19 pandemic.

On 17 March, two days after the completion of Round One, the Queensland Rugby League (QRL) announced a 10-week suspension of the competition until 5 June, due to the COVID-19 pandemic. On 27 March, ten days after the suspension, the QRL confirmed the cancellation of the competition for the 2020 season. QRL managing director Robert Moore stated, “by making this announcement now, it provides our clubs with the opportunity to re-set and turn their attention towards the 2021 season."

== Season summary ==
=== Milestones ===
- Round 1: Josh Hoffman and Moses Meninga made their debuts for the club.

== 2020 squad ==
Townsville Blackhawks
First team squad			Coaching staff
Carlin Anderson – FB, WG; Nathan Barrett – SR; Joe Boyce – LK, PR; Michael Carroll – WG; Josh Chudleigh – HK; Kalifa Faifai Loa – WG; Jaelen Feeney – HB, FE; Krys Freeman – HK; Tom Hancock – PR; Josh Hoffman – FB, WG	Sam Hoare (c) – PR; Patrick Kaufusi – SR, PR; Kyle Laybutt – HB, FE; Sione Lousi – PR; Jake Marketo – SR; Sam Martin-Savage – FE; Moses Meninga – PR; Harry Mulligan – FB; Sam Murphy – HK; Andrew Niemoeller – LK	Temone Power – SR; Kieran Quabba – LK; Bacho Salam – CE, WG; Lachlan Taylor – HK; Nathan Traill – WG, FB	Head coach: Aaron Payne; Assistant coaches: Allan Petersen (assistant coach); Adrian Thomson (team manager); Jason Tassell (trainer); Christian Quabba (trainer); Daniel Strickland (trainer); Legend: (c) Captain(s); (vc) Vice-captain(s); Updated: 6 February 2020; Source(s): Blackhawks

== Squad movement ==
=== Gains ===
Player	Signed from	Until end of	Notes
Carlin Anderson	North Queensland Cowboys	2020	
Tom Hancock	Northern Pride	2020	
Josh Hoffman	Parramatta Eels	2020	
Patrick Kaufusi	St George Illawarra Dragons	2020	
Moses Meninga	PNG Hunters	2020	
Harry Mulligan	Terrigal Sharks	2020	

=== Losses ===
Player	Signed from	Until end of	Notes
Dan Beasley	Retired	–	
Adam Cook	Canberra Raiders	2020	
Campbell Duffy	Sunshine Coast Falcons	2020	
Jack Glossop	Tweed Heads Seagulls	2020	
Rod Griffin	Northern Pride	2020	
Marshall Hudson	Released	–	
Chippie Korostchuk	Released	–	
Ryan Lloyd	Released	–	
Michael Parker-Walshe	Retired	–	
Tom McCagh	Souths Logan Magpies	–	
Shaun Nona	Limoux Grizzlies	2020	
Zac Santo	Limoux Grizzlies	2020	
Jayden Stephens	Released	–	

== Fixtures ==
=== Pre-season ===
Date	Round	Opponent	Venue	Score	Tries	Goals
Saturday, 15 February	Trial 1	Mackay Cutters	Denison Park	24 – 12		
Saturday, 22 February	Trial 2	Northern Pride	Barlow Park	34 – 6		
Legend: Win Loss Draw Bye

=== Regular season ===
Date	Round	Opponent	Venue	Score	Tries	Goals
Saturday, 14 March	Round 1	Ipswich Jets	North Ipswich Reserve	16 – 10	Asi, Marketo	Laybutt (2), Anderson (1), Taulagi (1)
Legend: Win Loss Draw Bye

== Statistics ==
*	Denotes player contracted to the North Queensland Cowboys for the 2020 season

Name	App	T	G	FG	Pts
Carlin Anderson	1	-	1	-	2
Daejarn Asi*	1	1	-	-	4
Joe Boyce	1	-	-	-	-
Josh Chudleigh	1	-	-	-	-
Kalifa Faifai Loa	1	-	-	-	-
Jaelen Feeney	1	-	-	-	-
Tom Gilbert*	1	-	-	-	-
Josh Hoffman	1	-	-	-	-
Kyle Laybutt	1	-	2	-	4
Sione Lousi	1	-	-	-	-
Jake Marketo	1	1	-	-	4
Moses Meninga	1	-	-	-	-
Sam Murphy	1	-	-	-	-
Tom Opacic*	1	-	-	-	-
Temone Power	1	-	-	-	-
Kieran Quabba	1	-	-	-	-
Murray Taulagi*	1	-	1	-	2
Totals		2	4	0	16
