= 2022 Townsville Blackhawks season =

- Queensland Cup Rank: 8th
- 2022 record: Wins: 7; draws: 1; losses: 7
- Points scored: For: 384; against: 320

Team information
- CEO: Justin Wilkins
- Coach: Aaron Payne
- Captain: Josh Chudleigh
- Stadium: Jack Manski Oval

Top scorers
- Tries: Kalifa Faifai Loa (12)
- Goals: Shaun Nona (29)
- Points: Shaun Nona (66)
← 2021	2023 →

The 2022 Townsville Blackhawks season is the eighth in the club's history. Coached by Aaron Payne and captained by Josh Chudleigh, they competed in the Hostplus Cup.

== Season summary ==
=== Milestones ===
- Round 1: Jake Bourke, Tom Chester, Jordan Lipp, Kayleb Milne and Emry Pere made their debuts for the club.
- Round 1: Tom Chester scored his first try for the club.
- Round 2: Zac McMinn and Taniela Sadrugu made their debuts for the club.
- Round 2: Taniela Sadrugu scored his first try for the club.
- Round 3: Iosefo Baleiwairiki made his debut for the club.
- Round 3: Jordan Lipp, Aaron Moore and Emry Pere scored their first tries for the club.
- Round 4: Iosefo Baleiwairiki scored his first try for the club.
- Round 9: Oscar Carter and Justin Frain made their debuts for the club.
- Round 9: Justin Frain scored his first try for the club.
- Round 11: Zac Laybutt and D'Jazirhae Pua'avase made their debuts for the club.
- Round 11: Zac Laybutt and D'Jazirhae Pua'avase scored their first tries for the club.
- Round 11: Kyle Laybutt played his 80th game for the club, overtaking Sam Hoare was the club's most capped player.
- Round 13 Eddie Hampson made his debut for the club.
- Round 13: Zac McMinnm scored his first try for the club.
- Round 14: Edene Gebbie made his debut for the club.
- Round 14: Edene Gebbie and Eddie Hampson scored their first tries for the club.
- Round 16: Kulikefu Finefeuiaki and Jaymon Moore made their debuts for the club.
- Round 16: Jake Bourke scored his first try for the club.

== 2022 squad ==
Townsville Blackhawks
First team squad			Coaching staff
Nathan Barrett – SR; Michael Bell – CE; Joe Boyce – PR, LK; Michael Carroll – WG; Oscar Carter – HK; Josh Chudleigh (c) – HK; John Cullen – CE; Kalifa Faifai Loa – WG; Jaelen Feeney – HB, FB; Justin Frain – SR; Luke Geary – WG, CE; Edene Gebbie – FB, WG	Mitchell Grimes – LK; Eddie Hampson – SR; Tom Hancock – PR; Jack Johnson – LK; Patrick Kaufusi – PR; Jordan Kenworthy – LK; Kyle Laybutt – HB, HK; Robert Lui – HB; Cade Maloney – PR; Zac McMinn – LK; Moses Meninga – PR, LK; Kayleb Milne – PR	Adam Mitchell – SR; Aaron Moore – HB; Jaymon Moore – PR; Faron Morris – PR; Sam Murphy – HK, LK; Andrew Niemoeller – LK, SR; Shaun Nona – FE, HB; Jordon Remfrey – CE; Hamilton Taia – PR; Dylan White – FB	Head coach: Aaron Payne; Assistant coaches: Allan Petersen (Assistant coach); Adrian Thomson (Team Manager); Matthew Ham (Strength & Conditioning coach); Christian Quabba (Strength & Conditioning coach); Daniel Strickland (Strength & Conditioning coach); Legend: (c) Captain(s); (vc) Vice-captain(s); Updated: 27 July 2022; Source(s): Blackhawks

== Squad movement ==
=== Gains ===
Player	Signed from	Until end of	Notes
Oscar Carter	Herbert River Crushers	2022	
John Cullen	Townsville Brothers	2022	
Justin Frain	Ryde-Eastwood Hawks	2022	
Edene Gebbie	Wests Tigers	2022	
Mitchell Grimes	Herbert River Crushers	2022	
Robert Lui	Leeds Rhinos	2022	
Kayleb Milne	Cronulla-Sutherland Sharks	2022	
Jaymon Moore	Mackay Cutters	2022	
Faron Morris	Townsville Brothers	2022	
Jordon Remfrey	Mounties RLFC	2022	

=== Losses ===
Player	Signed to	Until end of	Notes
Carlin Anderson	Work commitments	–	
Nick Brown	Released	–	
Benn Campagnolo	South Sydney Rabbitohs	2022	
Sam Hoare	Retired	–	
Josh Hoffman	Released	–	
Cameron King	Retired	–	
Sione Lousi	Retired	–	
Sam Martin-Savage	Year off	–	
Cody Maughan	Released	–	
Kieran Quabba	Work commitments	–	
Bacho Salam	Brisbane Tigers	2022	

== Fixtures ==
=== Pre-season ===
Date	Round	Opponent	Venue	Score	Tries	Goals
Saturday, 5 March	Trial 1	Northern Pride	Barlow Park	6 – 22	-	-
Saturday, 12 March	Trial 2	Mackay Cutters	Denison Park	24 – 18	Chudleigh (2), Feeney, Lipp	Bell (4)
Legend: Win Loss Draw Bye

=== Regular season ===
Date	Round	Opponent	Venue	Score	Tries	Goals
Saturday, March 20	Round 1	Norths Devils	Jack Manski Oval	14 – 8	Chester, Chudleigh, Faifai Loa	Chudleigh (1)
Saturday, March 26	Round 2	Burleigh Bears	Jack Manski Oval	22 – 26	Faifai Loa, Feeney, Price, Sadrugu	Bell (3)
Friday, April 1	Round 3	Wynnum Manly Seagulls	Jack Manski Oval	28 – 12	Faifai Loa, Kaufusi, Lipp, A Moore, Pere	K Laybutt (4)
Saturday, April 9	Round 4	Northern Pride	Barlow Park	22 – 12	Faifai Loa (2), Baleiwairiki, Bell	Bell (3)
Sunday, April 24	Round 5	Tweed Heads Seagulls	Jack Manski Oval	17 – 4	Chudleigh, Faifai Loa, Lui	Bell (2, 1 FG)
Saturday, April 30	Round 6	Redcliffe Dolphins	Moreton Daily Stadium	29 – 28	Bell (2), Baleiwairiki, Chudleigh, Sadrugu	Bell (4, 1 FG)
	Round 7	Bye				
Friday, May 13	Round 8	PNG Hunters	Jack Manski Oval	20 – 42	Feeney, Lipp, A Moore, Sadrugu	Bell (2)
Saturday, May 21	Round 9	Ipswich Jets	North Ipswich Reserve	40 – 10	Feeney (3), Lipp (2), Boyce, Frain	Nona (5), Bell (1)
Saturday, June 4	Round 10	Mackay Cutters	Jack Manski Oval	18 – 28	Faifai Loa, Feeney, K Laybutt	Nona (2), K Laybutt (1)
Saturday, June 11	Round 11	CQ Capras	Browne Park	16 – 22	Nona (2), Faifai Loa	Nona (2)
Saturday, June 18	Round 12	Brisbane Tigers	Jack Manski Oval	30 – 18	Baleiwairiki, Boyce, Faifai Loa, Z Laybutt, Pua'avase	Nona (5)
Saturday, July 2	Round 13	Sunshine Coast Falcons	Sunshine Coast Stadium	18 – 28	Carroll (2), McMinn	Z Laybutt (3)
Saturday, July 9	Round 14	Souths Logan Magpies	Jack Manski Oval	72 – 0	Chester (3), Faifai Loa (2), Z Laybutt (2), Bell, Gebbie, Hampson, K Laybutt, Maloney, Pere	Nona (10)
Saturday, July 16	Round 15	Burleigh Bears	Pizzey Park	16 – 30	Faifai Loa, Lui, Sadrugu	Nona (2)
Saturday, July 23	Round 16	Redcliffe Dolphins	Burdekin RL Park	22 – 22	Sadrugu (2), Bourke, Z Laybutt (2)	Nona (3)
Saturday, August 6	Round 17	Northern Pride	Jack Manski Oval			
Saturday, August 13	Round 18	PNG Hunters	Bycroft Oval			
Saturday, August 20	Round 19	Tweed Heads Seagulls	Piggabeen Sports Complex			
Saturday, August 27	Round 20	Norths Devils	Bishop Park			
Legend: Win Loss Draw Bye

== Statistics ==
*	Denotes player contracted to the North Queensland Cowboys for the 2022 season

Name	App	T	G	FG	Pts
Iosefi Baleiwairiki*	7	3	-	-	12
Nathan Barrett	8	-	-	-	-
Michael Bell	11	4	15	2	48
Jake Bourke*	3	1	-	-	4
Joe Boyce	11	2	-	-	8
Michael Carroll	2	2	-	-	8
Oscar Carter	3	-	-	-	-
Tom Chester*	10	4	-	-	16
Josh Chudleigh	8	3	1	-	14
Kalifa Faifai Loa	15	12	-	-	48
Jaelen Feeney	8	6	-	-	24
Kulikefu Finefeuiaki*	1	-	-	-	-
Justin Frain	5	1	-	-	4
Edene Gebbie	2	1	-	-	4
Eddie Hampson	3	1	-	-	4
Tom Hancock	15	-	-	-	-
Patrick Kaufusi	12	1	-	-	4
Jordan Kenworthy	1	-	-	-	-
Kyle Laybutt	14	2	5	-	18
Zac Laybutt*	6	4	3	-	22
Jordan Lipp*	11	4	-	-	16
Robert Lui	10	2	-	-	8
Cade Maloney	14	1	-	-	4
Zac McMinn	9	1	-	-	4
Kayleb Milne	5	-	-	-	-
Aaron Moore	11	2	-	-	8
Jaymon Moore	1	-	-	-	-
Shaun Nona	7	2	29	-	66
Emry Pere*	11	2	-	-	8
Riley Price*	14	1	-	-	4
D'Jazirhae Pua'avase*	5	1	-	-	4
Taniela Sadrugu*	12	6	-	-	24
Totals		69	53	2	384
