= 2018 Townsville Blackhawks season =

- Queensland Cup rank: 3rd
- Play-off result: Lost Elimination Final
- 2018 record: Wins: 15; draws: 0; losses: 8
- Points scored: For: 571; against: 348

Team information
- CEO: Justin Wilkins
- Coach: Kristian Woolf
- Captain: Andrew Niemoeller
- Stadium: Jack Manski Oval

Top scorers
- Tries: Kalifa Faifai Loa (16)
- Goals: Zach Dockar-Clay; Levi Dodd (29)
- Points: Zach Dockar-Clay (87)
← 2017	2019 →

The 2018 Townsville Blackhawks season was the fourth in the club's history. Coached by Kristian Woolf and captained by Andrew Niemoeller, they competed in the Intrust Super Cup. The club finished the regular season in 3rd position and qualified for the finals but were eliminated in the first week by the Ipswich Jets.

== Season summary ==
=== Milestones ===
- Round 1: Joe Boyce, Michael Carroll, Zach Dockar-Clay, Kalifa Faifai Loa, Jaelen Feeney, Krys Freeman, Rod Griffin, Shaun Hudson and Jake Marketo made their debuts for the club.
- Round 1: Michael Carroll, Zach Dockar-Clay, Kalifa Faifai Loa, Jaelen Feeney, Krys Freeman and Jake Marketo scored their first tries for the club.
- Round 2: Francis Molo scored his first try for the club.
- Round 3: Brent Woolf made his debut for the club.
- Round 4: Andrew Davey made his debut for the club.
- Round 5: Cade Maloney made his debut for the club.
- Round 5: Brent Woolf scored his first try for the club.
- Round 6: Levi Dodd made his debut for the club.
- Round 7: Levi Dodd scored his first try for the club.
- Round 8: Shaun Hudson and Cade Maloney scored their first tries for the club.
- Round 13: Sam Martin-Savage made his debut for the club.
- Round 16: Justin O'Neill made his debut for the club.
- Round 16: Rod Griffin scored his first try for the club.
- Round 19: Andrew Davey scored his first try for the club.
- Round 24: Bacho Salam made his debut for the club.
- Round 24: Bacho Salam scored his first try for the club.

== 2018 squad ==
Townsville Blackhawks
First team squad			Coaching staff
Daniel Beasley – PR; Ross Bella – PR, LK; Joe Boyce – LK; Paul Byrnes – WG, FB; Michael Carroll – WG; Ty Carucci – CE; Davin Crampton – CE; Andrew Davey – SR; Duarne Dempsey – HK, LK; Zach Dockar-Clay – HB; Levi Dodd – CE	Jordan Drew – CE; Kalifa Faifai Loa – WG; Jaelen Feeney – FE, HB; Sam Foster – HB; Krys Freeman – HK; Rod Griffin – PR; Jordan Kenworthy – LK, SR; Sione Lousi – PR; Cade Maloney – PR; Jake Marketo – SR; Sam Martin-Savage – HB, FE	Cody Maughan – CE; David Munro – LK, PR; Andrew Niemoeller (c) – LK, SR; Temone Power – LK; Kieran Quabba – LK; Jonathon Reuben – WG; Bacho Salam – WG; Brenden Santi – LK; Zac Santo – FB; Brent Woolf – HK	Head coach: Kristian Woolf; Assistant coaches: Dave Elliott; Ben Jeffries; Legend: (c) Captain(s); (vc) Vice-captain(s); Updated: 15 February 2018; Source(s): Blackhawks

== Squad movement ==
=== Gains ===
Player	Signed From	Until end of	Notes
Daniel Beasley	Albi RL XIII (mid-season)	2018	
Joe Boyce	Brisbane Broncos	2018	
Michael Carroll	North Queensland Cowboys	2018	
Andrew Davey	Mackay Cutters	2018	
Duarne Dempsey	North Queensland Cowboys	2018	
Zach Dockar-Clay	Hull Kingston Rovers	2018	
Levi Dodd	St George Illawarra Dragons	2018	
Kalifa Faifai Loa	St George Illawarra Dragons	2018	
Jaelen Feeney	Newcastle Knights	2018	
Krys Freeman	Central Queensland Capras	2018	
Rod Griffin	Canterbury Bulldogs	2018	
Jake Marketo	Timișoara Saracens	2018	
Sam Martin-Savage	Penrith Panthers	2018	
Cody Maughan	North Queensland Cowboys	2018	
Bacho Salam	Centrals ASA	2018	
Brenden Santi	Sydney Roosters	2018	
Zac Santo	Warriors (mid-season)	2018	
Brent Woolf	Brisbane Broncos	2018	

=== Losses ===
Player	Signed From	Until end of	Notes
Carlin Anderson	North Queensland Cowboys	2019	
Daniel Beasley	Albi RL XIII	2018	
Blake Leary	Burleigh Bears	2018	
Anthony Mitchell	Retired	-	
Francis Molo	North Queensland Cowboys	2018	
Kierran Moseley	Ipswich Jets	2018	
Michael Parker-Walshe	Townsville Brothers	2019	
Oshae Tuiasau	Norths Devils	2018	

== Fixtures ==
=== Pre-season ===
Date	Round	Opponent	Venue	Score	Tries	Goals
Saturday, 17 February	Trial 1	CQ Capras	Wests Mackay Leagues Club	40 – 8	-	-

=== Regular season ===
Date	Round	Opponent	Venue	Score	Tries	Goals
Saturday, 10 March	Round 1	Mackay Cutters	BB Print Stadium	56 – 12	Carroll (2), Reuben (2), Anderson, Dockar-Clay, Faifai Loa, Feeney, Freeman, Marketo	Anderson (8)
Saturday, 17 March	Round 2	Ipswich Jets	North Ipswich Reserve	18 – 20	Faifai Loa, Feeney, Molo	Anderson (3)
Saturday, 24 March	Round 3	Northern Pride	Jack Manski Oval	6 – 26	Feeney	Anderson (1)
Saturday, 31 March	Round 4	Redcliffe Dolphins	Dolphin Stadium	14 – 26	Feeney (2), Carucci	Anderson (1)
Saturday, 7 April	Round 5	Tweed Heads Seagulls	Jack Manski Oval	38 – 4	Reuben (2), Anderson, Bella, Dockar-Clay, Drew, Woolf	Dockar-Clay (5)
Saturday, 14 April	Round 6	Sunshine Coast Falcons	Sunshine Coast Stadium	20 – 18	Byrnes, Faifai Loa, Feeney, Reuben	Dockar-Clay (2)
Saturday, 21 April	Round 7	Norths Devils	Jack Manski Oval	30 – 16	Reuben (2), Dodd, Drew, Marketo	Dockar-Clay (5)
Saturday, 29 April	Round 8	Souths Logan Magpies	Jack Manski Oval	38 – 14	Dodd (2), Carroll, Faifai Loa, Freeman, Hudson, Maloney	Dodd (5)
Saturday, 5 May	Round 9	Burleigh Bears	Jack Manski Oval	13 – 6	Dockar-Clay, Feeney	Dodd (2); Dockar-Clay (1 FG)
	Round 10	Bye				
Saturday, 20 May	Round 11	Wynnum Manly Seagulls	Jack Manski Oval	26 – 12	Carucci, Dockar-Clay, Faifai Loa, Freeman, Power	Dodd (3)
Sunday, 27 May	Round 12	PNG Hunters	National Football Stadium	8 – 12	Carucci, Faifai Loa	
Saturday, 2 June	Round 13	CQ Capras	Browne Park	32 – 12	Reuben (2), Faifai Loa, Feeney, Marketo, Power	Dodd (4)
Saturday, 9 June	Round 14	Easts Tigers	Jack Manski Oval	32 – 0	Niemoeller (2), Carucci, Faifai Loa, Hudson, Santo	Dodd (3), Feeney (1)
Saturday, 16 June	Round 15	Mackay Cutters	Jack Manski Oval	28 – 22	Faifai Loa (2), Freeman, Power, Woolf	Dodd (4)
Saturday, 30 June	Round 16	Northern Pride	Atherton Stadium	10 – 13	Griffin, Reuben	Dodd (1)
Saturday, 7 July	Round 17	Sunshine Coast Falcons	Jack Manski Oval	22 – 8	Anderson, Dockar-Clay, Faifai Loa, Feeney	Dockar-Clay (3)
Saturday, 14 July	Round 18	Ipswich Jets	Jack Manski Oval	22 – 14	Dodd, Dockar-Clay, Feeney	Dockar-Clay (5)
Sunday, 22 July	Round 19	Tweed Heads Seagulls	Flinders Sports Ground	62 – 12	Faifai Loa (2), Feeney (2), Reuben (2), Anderson, Davey, Freeman, Hudson, Lousi, Power	Dockar-Clay (7)
Sunday, 29 July	Round 20	Souths Logan Magpies	Davies Park	16 – 6	Anderson, Freeman, Power	Faifai Loa (2)
Saturday, 4 August	Round 21	Norths Devils	Bishop Park	24 – 27	Feeney (2), Davey, Freeman, Santo	Dockar-Clay (2)
Saturday, 11 August	Round 22	Redcliffe Dolphins	Jack Manski Oval	18 – 20	Dockar-Clay, Faifai Loa, Reuben, Santo	Faifai Loa (1)
Saturday, 18 August	Round 23	Burleigh Bears	Pizzey Park	12 – 22	Davey (2)	Dodd (2)
Saturday, 25 August	Round 24	Wynnum Manly Seagulls	Kougari Oval	26 – 22	Faifai Loa (2), Feeney, Griffin, Salam	Dodd (3)
Legend: Win Loss Draw Bye

=== Finals ===
Date	Round	Opponent	Venue	Score	Tries	Goals
Sunday, 3 September	Elimination Final	Ipswich Jets	Jack Manski Oval	12 – 32	Davey, Jensen	Dodd (2)
Legend: Win Loss Draw Bye

== Statistics ==
*	Denotes player contracted to the North Queensland Cowboys for the 2018 season

Name	App	T	G	FG	Pts
Carlin Anderson*	11	5	13	-	46
Daniel Beasley	8	-	-	-	-
Ross Bella	9	1	-	-	4
Joe Boyce	20	-	-	-	-
Paul Byrnes	2	1	-	-	4
Michael Carroll	4	3	-	-	12
Ty Carucci	10	4	-	-	16
Davin Crampton	1	-	-	-	-
Andrew Davey	14	5	-	-	20
Zach Dockar-Clay	17	7	29	1	87
Levi Dodd	16	4	29	-	74
Jordan Drew	6	2	-	-	8
Kalifa Faifai Loa	23	16	3	-	70
Jaelen Feeney	22	15	1	-	62
Shaun Fensom*	1	-	-	-	-
Sam Foster	1	-	-	-	-
Krys Freeman	24	7	-	-	28
Rod Griffin	22	2	-	-	8
Shaun Hudson*	23	3	-	-	12
Corey Jensen*	5	1	-	-	4
Jordan Kenworthy	1	-	-	-	-
Sione Lousi	22	1	-	-	4
Cade Maloney	13	1	-	-	4
Jake Marketo	21	3	-	-	12
Sam Martin-Savage	1	-	-	-	-
Francis Molo*	15	1	-	-	4
David Munro	1	-	-	-	-
Andrew Niemoeller	13	2	-	-	8
Justin O'Neill*	3	-	-	-	-
Temone Power	21	5	-	-	20
Jonathon Reuben	19	13	-	-	52
Bacho Salam	2	1	-	-	4
Brenden Santi	8	-	-	-	-
Zac Santo	12	3	-	-	12
Brent Woolf	17	2	-	-	8
Totals		108	75	1	583

== Honours ==
=== Club ===
- Player of the Year: Kalifa Faifai Loa
- Players' Player: Temone Power
- Back of the Year: Jaelen Feeney
- Forward of the Year: Jake Marketo
- Under 20 Player of the Year: Sam Martin-Savage
- Under 18 Player of the Year: Isaac Locke

=== League ===
- Winger of the Year: Kalifa Faifai Loa
