= 2019 Queensland Cup =

- Duration: March 9 – September 29, 2019
- Teams: 14
- Premiers: Burleigh Bears (4th title)
- Minor premiers: Sunshine Coast Falcons (1st title)
- Matches played: 170
- Points scored: 7,549
- Top points scorer: Todd Murphy (280)
- Player of the year: Jamal Fogarty (Petero Civoniceva Medal)
- Top try-scorer(s): Jonathon Reuben; Matt Soper-Lawler (23)

The 2019 Queensland Cup season was the 24th season of Queensland's top-level statewide rugby league competition run by the Queensland Rugby League. The competition, known as the Intrust Super Cup due to sponsorship from Intrust Super, featured 14 teams playing a 27-week long season (including finals) from March to September.

The Burleigh Bears won their fourth premiership after defeating the Wynnum Manly Seagulls 28–10 in the Grand Final at Dolphin Stadium. Burleigh halfback Jamal Fogarty was named the competition's Player of the Year, winning the Petero Civoniceva Medal.

== Teams ==
In 2019, the lineup of teams remained unchanged for the fifth consecutive year.

Colours	Club	Home ground(s)	Head coach(s)	Captain(s)	NRL Affiliate
	Burleigh Bears	Pizzey Park	Jim Lenihan	Luke Page	Gold Coast Titans
	Central Queensland Capras	Browne Park	David Faiumu	Jack Madden	None
	Easts Tigers	Langlands Park	Scott Sipple	Jake Foster	Melbourne Storm
	Ipswich Jets	North Ipswich Reserve	Ben & Shane Walker	Nathaniel Neale	None
	Mackay Cutters	BB Print Stadium	Steve Sheppard	Cooper Bambling	North Queensland Cowboys
	Northern Pride	Barlow Park	Ty Williams	Tom Hancock	North Queensland Cowboys
	Norths Devils	Bishop Park	Rohan Smith	Jack Ahearn	Brisbane Broncos
	Papua New Guinea Hunters	National Football Stadium	Michael Marum	Ase Boas	None
	Redcliffe Dolphins	Dolphin Stadium	Adam Mogg	Aaron Whitchurch	Brisbane Broncos
	Souths Logan Magpies	Davies Park	Jon Buchanan	Brendon Gibb & Guy Hamilton	Brisbane Broncos
	Sunshine Coast Falcons	Sunshine Coast Stadium	Eric Smith	Dane Hogan	Melbourne Storm
	Townsville Blackhawks	Jack Manski Oval	Aaron Payne	Sam Hoare	North Queensland Cowboys
	Tweed Heads Seagulls	Piggabeen Sports Complex	Ben Woolf	John Palavi	Gold Coast Titans
	Wynnum Manly Seagulls	BMD Kougari Oval	Adam Brideson	Mitch Cronin	Brisbane Broncos

== Ladder ==
2019 Queensland Cup
Pos	Team	Pld	W	D	L	PF	PA	PD	Pts
1	Sunshine Coast Falcons	23	21	1	1	856	292	+564	43
2	Wynnum Manly Seagulls	23	18	0	5	652	362	+290	36
3	Burleigh Bears (P)	23	17	0	6	663	304	+359	34
4	Townsville Blackhawks	23	17	0	6	566	344	+222	34
5	Norths Devils	23	15	0	8	619	477	+142	30
6	Tweed Heads Seagulls	23	14	0	9	464	438	+26	28
7	Redcliffe Dolphins	23	13	0	10	558	392	+166	26
8	Easts Tigers	23	10	1	12	478	541	-63	21
9	Ipswich Jets	23	9	1	13	466	563	-97	19
10	Souths Logan Magpies	23	7	1	15	465	694	-229	15
11	Mackay Cutters	23	7	0	16	416	566	-150	14
12	Northern Pride	23	5	0	18	342	635	-293	10
13	Papua New Guinea Hunters	23	4	1	18	315	750	-435	9
14	Central Queensland Capras	23	1	1	21	318	820	-502	3

== Final series ==
For the first time in competition history, the Queensland Cup used an eight-team finals series in 2019, the same format used in the NRL.

Home	Score	Away	Match Information
Home	Score	Away	Date and Time (Local)	Venue
Qualifying & Elimination Finals
Tweed Heads Seagulls	24 – 25	Redcliffe Dolphins	8 September 2019, 11:40am	Piggabeen Sports Complex
Norths Devils	20 – 24	Easts Tigers	8 September 2019, 1:10pm	Bishop Park
Wynnum Manly Seagulls	32 – 34	Burleigh Bears	8 September 2019, 2:00pm	BMD Kougari Oval
Sunshine Coast Falcons	12 – 20	Townsville Blackhawks	8 September 2019, 2:00pm	Sunshine Coast Stadium
Semi-finals
Wynnum Manly Seagulls	20 – 16	Redcliffe Dolphins	15 September 2019, 12:05pm	BMD Kougari Oval
Sunshine Coast Falcons	22 – 14	Easts Tigers	15 September 2019, 12:05pm	Sunshine Coast Stadium
Preliminary Finals
Townsville Blackhawks	14 – 26	Wynnum Manly Seagulls	21 September 2019, 3:00pm	Jack Manski Oval
Burleigh Bears	24 – 6	Sunshine Coast Falcons	22 September 2019, 3:05pm	Pizzey Park
Grand Final
Wynnum Manly Seagulls	10 – 28	Burleigh Bears	29 September 2019, 3:10pm	Dolphin Stadium

Qualifying and elimination finals
8 Sept, Sunshine Coast Stadium
1	Sunshine Coast	12
4	Townsville	20
8 Sept, Bishop Park
5	Norths	20
8	Easts	24
8 Sept, Piggabeen Sports Complex
6	Tweed Heads	24
7	Redcliffe	25
8 Sept, BMD Kougari Oval
2	Wynnum Manly	32
3	Burleigh	34

Semi-finals
15 Sept, Sunshine Coast Stadium
Sunshine Coast	22
Easts	14
15 Sept, BMD Kougari Oval
Wynnum Manly	20
Redcliffe	16

Preliminary finals
21 Sept, Jack Manski Oval
Townsville	14
Wynnum Manly	26
22 Sept, Pizzey Park
Burleigh	24
Sunshine Coast	6

Grand final
29 Sept, Dolphin Stadium
Wynnum Manly	10
Burleigh	28

== Grand Final ==
Wynnum Manly finished the regular season in second and were defeated by third-placed Burleigh in the second qualifying final. They then eliminated defending premiers Dolphins in the semi-final and travelled to Townsville, where they defeated the Blackhawks in the preliminary final to qualify for their third Grand Final. After defeating Wynnum Manly in the qualifying final, Burleigh earned a week off and faced minor premiers the Sunshine Coast, who they beat 20–6 to qualify for their sixth Grand Final.

=== First half ===
Burleigh got the scoring underway in the Grand Final, kicking a penalty goal in the 14th minute. They scored the first try of the game six minutes later when winger Tyronne Roberts-Davis scored in the left corner untouched. Another try in the 30th minute extended their lead to 12 after Jamal Fogarty grubbered through the line and regathered, finding Kurtis Rowe in support, who scored next to the posts. Wynnum Manly finally got on the scoreboard in the 34th minute, when halfback Sam Scarlett dived on his own kick after a Burleigh error in the in-goal.

=== Second half ===
Wynnum opened the second half strongly, with a try to winger Edward Burns from a Patrick Templeman kick, bringing them within two points of Burleigh. The Bears hit back shortly after, when Rowe caught a bouncing Dylan Phythian kick to score his second try of the game. In the 67th minute, hooker Pat Politoni extended Burleigh's lead to 12 when he darted over from dummy half to score. Burleigh sealed the victory, and their fourth premiership, when Fogarty picked up a Seagulls' kick and ran 90 metres untouched to score under the posts. Kurtis Rowe was awarded the Duncan Hall Medal for man of the match for his two-try effort.

=== Scoreboard ===
2019 HostPlus Cup Grand Final

Sunday, 29 September
15:10 AEST (UTC+10)

Wynnum Manly Seagulls	10 – 28	Burleigh Bears
Tries: 2 Scarlett 34'; Burns 48'; Goals: 1 Templeman 50' (1/2)	1st: 4–12; 2nd: 6–16; Report(subscription required); Stats	Tries: 5 Rowe 30', 52'; Roberts-Davis 21'; Politoni 68'; Fogarty 77'; Goals: 4 Fogarty pen 13', 32', 70' (3/5); Roberts-Davis 77' (1/1)

Moreton Daily Stadium, Redcliffe
Attendance: 7,784
Referees: Liam Kennedy, Tyson Brough
Duncan Hall Medal: Kurtis Rowe (Burleigh)

Team details
Wynnum Manly Seagulls		Position	Burleigh Bears
Name	Number	Position	Number	Name
Edene Gebbie	1	FB	1	Kurtis Rowe
Edward Burns	2	WG	2	Tyronne Roberts-Davis
Delouise Hoeter	3	CE	3	Sami Sauiluma
Jordan Drew	4	CE	4	Josh Berkers
Junior Pauga	5	WG	5	Anthony Don
Patrick Templeman	6	FE	6	Dylan Phythian
Sam Scarlett	7	HB	7	Jamal Fogarty
Aaron Rockley	8	PR	8	Luke Page (c)
Mitch Cronin (c)	9	HK	9	Pat Politoni
Matt Groat	10	PF	10	Jack Buchanan
Keenan Palasia	11	SR	11	Hayden Schwass
Alex Barr	12	SR	12	Blake Leary
Kelly Tate	15	LK	13	Sam Coster
Lucky Ta'avale	13	IN	14	Matt Robinson
Jayden Berrell	14	IN	15	Josh Rogers
Lachlan Lee	16	IN	16	Oliver Percy
Kalolo Saitaua	19	IN	17	Api Noema-Matenga
Adam Brideson		Coach		Jim Lenihan
QRL

== NRL State Championship ==
After winning the Grand Final, the Burleigh Bears qualified for the NRL State Championship on NRL Grand Final day. They were defeated by the Newtown Jets, the New South Wales Cup premiers, 16–20.

2019 NRL State Championship

Sunday, 6 October
13:35 AEDT (UTC+11)

Newtown Jets	20 – 16	Burleigh Bears
Tries: 4 Katoa 54', 76'; Ferris 63', 80'; Goals: 2 Trindall pen 19' (1/4); Eastwood 80' (1/1); Sin bin: 1 Mulitalo (yellow card) 38' to 48'	1st: 2–10; 2nd: 18–6; Report	Tries: 3 Don 22', 30'; Fogarty 47'; Goals: 2 Fogarty 32', 48' (2/3)

ANZ Stadium, Sydney
Referees: Todd Smith, Tyson Brough
Player of the Match: Toby Rudolf (Newtown)

== Player statistics ==
The following statistics are as of the conclusion of the season (including finals).

=== Leading try scorers ===
Pos	Player	Team	Tries
1	Jonathon Reuben	Souths Logan Magpies	23
1	Matt Soper-Lawler	Sunshine Coast Falcons	23
3	Troy Leo	Burleigh Bears	22
4	Herbie Farnworth	Norths Devils	20
5	Edene Gebbie	Wynnum Manly Seagulls	19
6	Edwards Burns	Wynnum Manly Seagulls	16
7	Kurtis Rowe	Burleigh Bears	15
8	Harry Grant	Sunshine Coast Falcons	14
8	BJ Aufaga-Toomaga	Central Queensland Capras	14
8	Talor Walters	Tweed Heads Seagulls	14

=== Leading point scorers ===
Pos	Player	Team	T	G	FG	Pts
1	Todd Murphy	Sunshine Coast Falcons	10	120	-	280
2	Jamal Fogarty	Burleigh Bears	7	95	-	218
3	Herbie Farnworth	Norths Devils	20	62	-	204
4	Patrick Templeman	Wynnum Manly Seagulls	11	75	-	194
5	Lindon McGrady	Tweed Heads Seagulls	5	76	-	172
6	BJ Aufaga-Toomaga	Central Queensland Capras	14	43	-	142
7	Shaun Nona	Townsville Blackhawks	1	60	-	124
8	Marmin Barba	Ipswich Jets	10	41	-	122
9	Guy Hamilton	Souths Logan Magpies	3	46	1	105
10	Carlin Anderson	Townsville Blackhawks	6	39	-	102

== QRL awards ==
- Petero Civoniceva Medal (Best and Fairest): Jamal Fogarty ( Burleigh Bears)
- Coach of the Year: Eric Smith ( Sunshine Coast Falcons)
- Rookie of the Year: Tom Gilbert ( Townsville Blackhawks)
- Representative Player of the Year: Xavier Coates ( Queensland under-18, Tweed Heads Seagulls)

=== Team of the Year ===
Position	Nat	Winner	Club
Fullback	(Papua New Guinea)	Edene Gebbie	Wynnum Manly Seagulls
Wing	(Australia)	Jonathon Reuben	Sunshine Coast Falcons
Centre	(Australia)	Izaia Perese	Redcliffe Dolphins
Five-eighth	(Australia)	Patrick Templeman	Wynnum Manly Seagulls
Halfback	(Australia)	Todd Murphy	Sunshine Coast Falcons
Prop	(Australia)	Jordan Grant	Redcliffe Dolphins
Hooker	(Australia)	Harry Grant	Sunshine Coast Falcons
Second-row	(Australia)	Chris Lewis	Sunshine Coast Falcons
Lock	(Australia)	Tom Gilbert	Townsville Blackhawks

== See also ==
- Queensland Cup
- Queensland Rugby League
