= 2020 Queensland Cup =

Australian rugby league competition

- Duration: March 14–15, 2020 (Cancelled)
- Teams: 14
- Premiers: None
- Minor premiers: None
- Matches played: 7
- Points scored: 285
- Top points scorer(s): Ase Boas; Jamal Fogarty (12)
- Top try-scorer: Terry Wapi (3)

The 2020 Queensland Cup season was to be the 25th season of Queensland's top-level statewide rugby league competition run by the Queensland Rugby League. On 27 March, the competition, known as the Intrust Super Cup due to sponsorship from Intrust Super, was cancelled after one round due to the COVID-19 pandemic. It was the first time the competition would not be played out since its inaugural season in 1996.

== Teams ==
In 2020, the lineup of teams remained unchanged for the sixth consecutive year. On 13 December 2019, the Newcastle Knights formed a partnership with the Ipswich Jets but did not send players to the club. The cancelled 2020 season was the final year that the Brisbane Broncos and Redcliffe Dolphins were affiliated, having partnered since 2006. The Dolphins entered a partnership with the New Zealand Warriors for the 2021 season.

Colours	Club	Home ground(s)	Head coach(s)	Captain(s)	NRL Affiliate
	Burleigh Bears	Pizzey Park	Rick Stone	Luke Page	Gold Coast Titans
	Central Queensland Capras	Browne Park	David Faiumu	Jack Madden	Brisbane Broncos
	Easts Tigers	Langlands Park	Craig Hodges	Brett Greinke	Melbourne Storm
	Ipswich Jets	North Ipswich Reserve	Keiron Lander	Nathaniel Neale	Newcastle Knights
	Mackay Cutters	BB Print Stadium	Michael Crawley	Jayden Hodges	North Queensland Cowboys
	Northern Pride	Barlow Park	Ty Williams	Javid Bowen	North Queensland Cowboys
	Norths Devils	Pathion Park	Rohan Smith	Jack Ahearn	Brisbane Broncos
	Papua New Guinea Hunters	National Football Stadium	Matt Church	Ase Boas	None
	Redcliffe Dolphins	Dolphin Stadium	Adam Mogg	Cameron Cullen	Brisbane Broncos
	Souths Logan Magpies	Davies Park	Jon Buchanan	Darren Nicholls	Brisbane Broncos
	Sunshine Coast Falcons	Sunshine Coast Stadium	Sam Mawhinney	Dane Hogan	Melbourne Storm
	Townsville Blackhawks	Jack Manski Oval	Aaron Payne	Sam Hoare	North Queensland Cowboys
	Tweed Heads Seagulls	Piggabeen Sports Complex	Ben Woolf	Lamar Liolevave	Gold Coast Titans
	Wynnum-Manly Seagulls	BMD Kougari Oval	Adam Brideson	Mitch Cronin	Brisbane Broncos

== Cancellation ==
On 17 March, two days after the completion of Round One, the Queensland Rugby League (QRL) announced a 10-week suspension of the competition until 5 June, due to the COVID-19 pandemic. On 27 March, ten days after the suspension, the QRL confirmed the cancellation of the competition for the 2020 season. QRL managing director Robert Moore stated, “by making this announcement now, it provides our clubs with the opportunity to re-set and turn their attention towards the 2021 season."

== Ladder ==
2020 Queensland Cup
Pos	Team	Pld	W	D	L	PF	PA	PD	Pts
1	Easts Tigers	1	1	0	0	44	4	+40	2
2	Burleigh Bears	1	1	0	0	34	6	+28	2
3	Tweed Heads Seagulls	1	1	0	0	16	10	+6	2
4	Townsville Blackhawks	1	1	0	0	16	10	+6	2
5	Redcliffe Dolphins	1	1	0	0	22	16	+6	2
6	Papua New Guinea Hunters	1	1	0	0	32	30	+2	2
7	Norths Devils	1	1	0	0	23	22	+1	2
8	Mackay Cutters	1	0	0	1	22	23	-1	0
9	Souths Logan Magpies	1	0	0	1	30	32	-2	0
10	Sunshine Coast Falcons	1	0	0	1	16	22	-6	0
11	Northern Pride	1	0	0	1	10	16	-6	0
12	Ipswich Jets	1	0	0	1	10	16	-6	0
13	Wynnum Manly Seagulls	1	0	0	1	6	34	-28	0
14	Central Queensland Capras	1	0	0	1	4	44	-40	0

== See also ==
- Queensland Cup
- Queensland Rugby League
