= Taniela Sadrugu =

Fiji international rugby league & union player (born 1998)

Personal information
- Full name: Taniela Sadrugu
- Born: 25 July 1998 (age 27) Fiji
- Height: 191 cm (6 ft 3 in)
- Weight: 106 kg (16 st 10 lb)

Playing information

Rugby union
Club
Years	Team	Pld	T	G	FG	P
20??–	CA Brive
Representative
Years	Team	Pld	T	G	FG	P
	Fiji 7s

Rugby league
- Position: Second-row, Centre, Wing
Representative
Years	Team	Pld	T	G	FG	P
2022–	Fiji	4	2	0	0	8
- Source: As of 1 January 2026

Taniela Sadrugu (born 25 July 1998) is a Fijian professional rugby union footballer who plays for the CA Brive.

== Background ==
He was born in Fiji.

== Rugby Sevens career ==
Sadrugu previously played for the Fiji sevens side at international level in rugby union.

== Club career ==
He is contracted to the North Queensland Cowboys in the NRL.

Playing mainly as a centre he scored 7 tries in 15 games for the Townsville Blackhawks in the Queensland Cup in 2022.

== International career ==
In October 2022 Sadrugu was named in the Fiji squad for the 2021 Rugby League World Cup.

In October 2022 Sadrugu made his international début for the Fiji Bati side against England.
