= Brent Woolf =

Australian rugby league footballer (born 1998)

Personal information
- Born: 11 February 1998 (age 28) Mount Isa, Queensland, Australia
- Height: 173 cm (5 ft 8 in)
- Weight: 89 kg (14 st 0 lb)

Playing information
- Position: Hooker
Club
Years	Team	Pld	T	G	FG	P
2026–	Dolphins	1	0	0	0	0
- Source: RLP

Brent Woolf (born 11 February 1998) is an Australian rugby league footballer for the Dolphins in the National Rugby League (NRL).

== Early life ==
Born in Mount Isa, Queensland, Woolf is a nephew of rugby league coach Kristian Woolf and played junior rugby league for the Mudgeeraba Redbacks on the Gold Coast, where he attended Keebra Park State High School. His father Ben is also a rugby league coach.

== Career ==
A hooker, Woolf was a Queensland under-18s representative player and before getting his opportunity in the NRL served a long apprenticeship in the Queensland Cup, beginning in 2016 with Wynnum-Manly. He played under his uncle Kristian with the Townsville Blackhawks in 2018, then spent the next five years at the Tweed Seagulls, a club coached for most of that time by his father Ben.

Woolf joined the Dolphins set up in 2024. He brought up his 100th Queensland Cup appearance while with Redcliffe in 2025, but still couldn't break into the Dolphins side, which were now led by his uncle. His 2026 season began with representative honours as a member of the Indigenous All-Stars and he made a belated NRL debut at the age of 28 in the Dolphins' opening round match against South Sydney, coming on off the bench. He spent the rest of the season back in the Queensland Cup, winning a premiership, as well as a State Championship title.
