= Michael Marketo =

Australian rugby league footballer

Personal information
- Full name: Michael Marketo
- Born: 27 May 1959 (age 67) Sydney, New South Wales, Australia

Playing information
- Position: Prop, Second-row
Club
Years	Team	Pld	T	G	FG	P
1983–87	Balmain Tigers	59	3	0	0	12
- Source: As of 8 July 2019
- Relatives: Jake Marketo (son)

Michael Marketo is an Australian former rugby league footballer who played in the 1980s. He played for Balmain in the New South Wales Rugby League (NSWRL) competition.

== Background ==
Marketo was born in Sydney, New South Wales, Australia. He is the father of Jake Marketo.

== Playing career ==
A Balmain junior, Marketo made his first grade debut for Balmain against Manly-Warringah in Round 6 1983 at Brookvale Oval. Marketo scored his first try for Balmain in Round 5 1984 against Penrith. In 1985, Marketo played 10 games as the club reached the minor semi final against Parramatta but lost the match 32–4. In 1986, Marketo enjoyed his best season as Balmain reached the preliminary final against Canterbury-Bankstown but the club fell short of a grand final appearance losing the match 28–16.

Marketo played one final season with Balmain in 1987. His last game in the top grade for the club was in Round 21 1987 against North Sydney at Leichhardt Oval which Balmain won 28–14.
