= Jordan Drew =

Canada international rugby league footballer

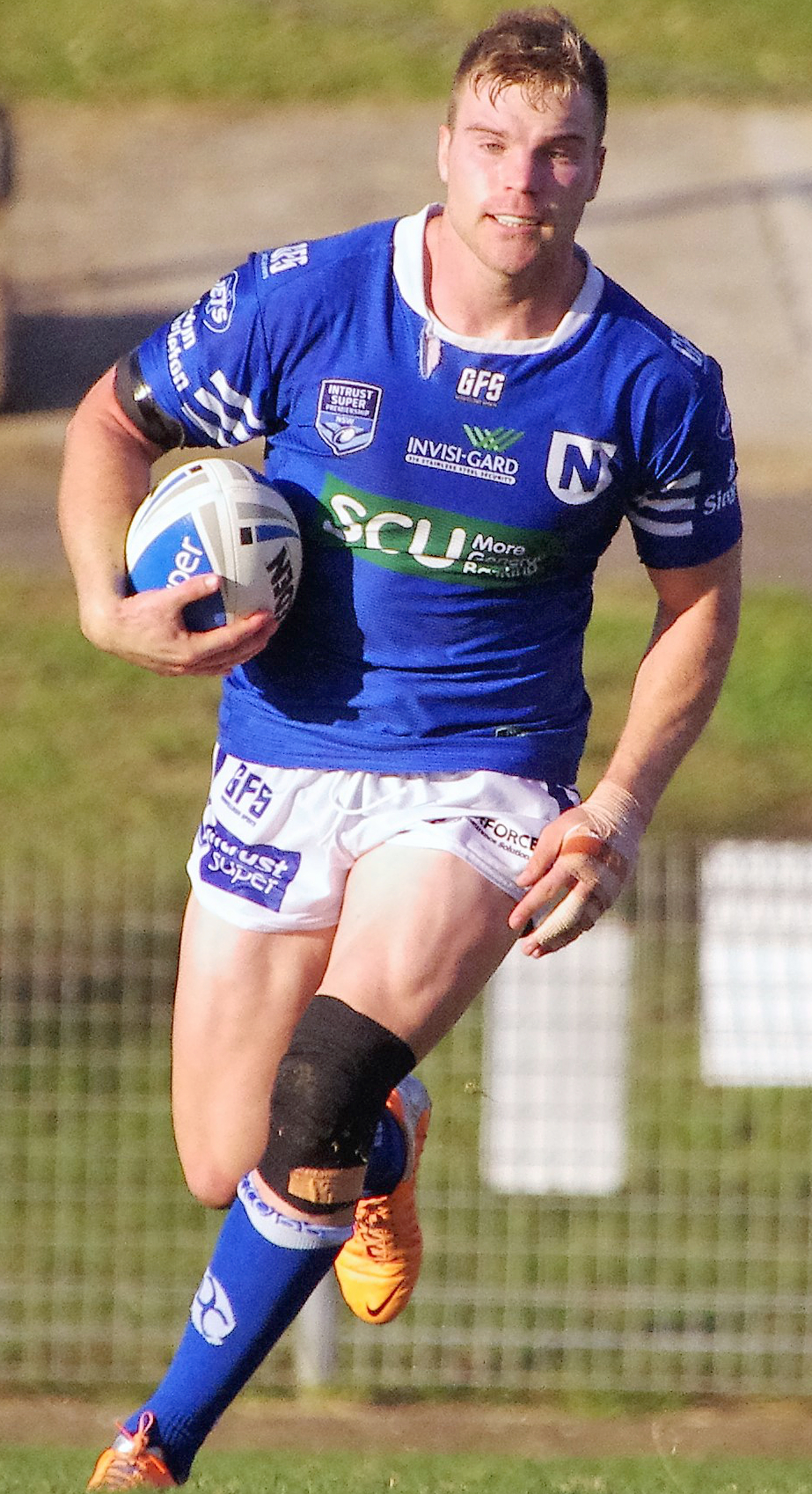

Personal information
- Full name: Jordan Drew
- Born: 26 January 1995 (age 31) Brisbane, Queensland, Australia
- Height: 183 cm (6 ft 0 in)
- Weight: 95 kg (14 st 13 lb)

Playing information
- Position: Centre, Fullback, Wing
Club
Years	Team	Pld	T	G	FG	P
2013	Brisbane Broncos	1	1	0	0	4
2020–	Limoux Grizzlies	4	3	0	0	12
	Total	5	4	0	0	16
Representative
Years	Team	Pld	T	G	FG	P
2016–17	NSW Residents	2	0	0	0	0
2018	Canada	2	0	0	0	0
- Source: As of 10 January 2024

Jordan Drew (born 26 January 1995) is a Canada international rugby league footballer who plays as a centre, fullback and winger for the Limoux Grizzlies in the Elite One Championship.

He previously played for the Brisbane Broncos in the NRL.

== Background ==
Drew was born in Brisbane, Queensland, Australia. He is of Canadian descent.

He played his junior rugby league for the Nanango Stags, before being signed by the Brisbane Broncos.

== Playing career ==
=== Early career ===
From 2013 to 2015, Drew played for the Brisbane Broncos' NYC team.

=== 2013 ===
In Round 22 of the 2013 NRL season, Drew made his NRL debut for the Brisbane club against St. George Illawarra, scoring a try on debut.

=== 2015 ===
On 2 May, Drew played for the Junior Kangaroos against the Junior Kiwis. On 8 July, he played for the Queensland under-20s team against the New South Wales under-20s team. On 14 September, he was named at centre in the 2015 NYC Team of the Year. On 20 October, he signed a two-year contract with the Cronulla-Sutherland Sharks starting in 2016, after being released from the final year of his Brisbane contract.

=== 2017 ===
On 23 June, Drew was granted a release from his Cronulla contract to join the Townsville Blackhawks mid-season. In his season and a half with Cronulla, he did not play a first grade game.

=== 2018 ===
Drew was selected to represent Canada for their 2021 Rugby League World Cup qualifying fixtures.

=== 2019 ===
After a season and a half with the Townsville outfit, Drew joined the Wynnum Manly Seagulls for the 2019 Queensland Cup season.

=== 2020 ===
On 14 August 2020 it was reported that he had signed for the Limoux Grizzlies in the Elite One Championship.

== International ==
He made his international début for Canada in the 8–38 loss to Jamaica on 13 November 2018.
