= Tom Gilbert (rugby league) =

Australian rugby league footballer

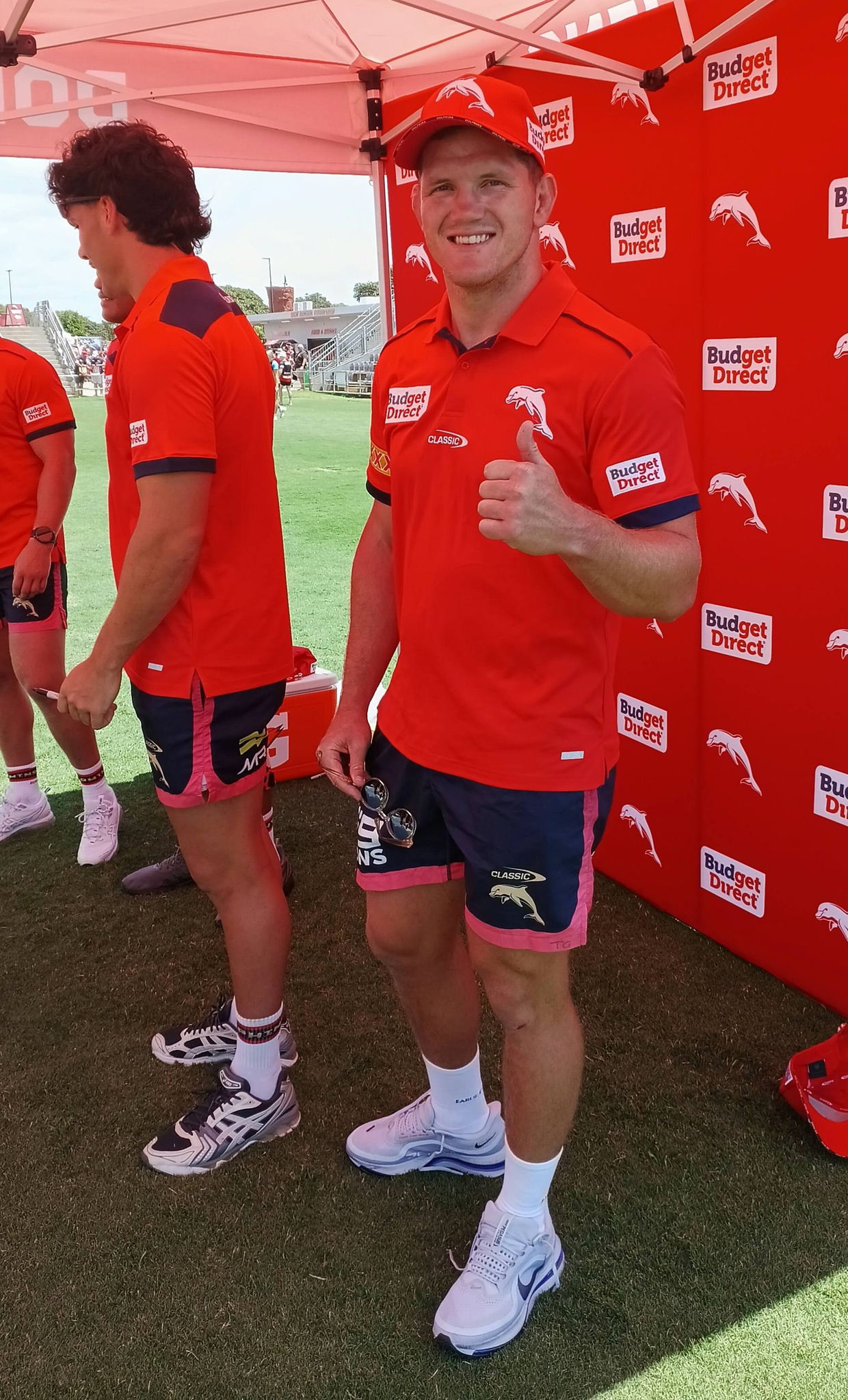

Personal information
- Full name: Thomas Gilbert
- Born: 5 August 2000 (age 26) Brisbane, Queensland, Australia
- Height: 185 cm (6 ft 1 in)
- Weight: 100 kg (15 st 10 lb)

Playing information
- Position: Second-row, Lock, Prop
Club
Years	Team	Pld	T	G	FG	P
2020–22	North Qld Cowboys	47	3	0	0	12
2023–	Dolphins	46	3	0	0	12
	Total	93	6	0	0	24
Representative
Years	Team	Pld	T	G	FG	P
2019	Queensland Residents	1	0	0	0	0
2022–23	Queensland	2	0	0	0	0
- Source: As of 25 September 2026

Tom Gilbert (born 5 August 2000) is an Australian professional rugby league footballer who captains and plays as a second-row, lock or prop forward for the Dolphins in the National Rugby League (NRL). He previously played for the North Qld Cowboys in the NRL and has also represented Queensland in the State of Origin series.

== Background ==
Born and raised in Brisbane, Gilbert played junior rugby league for the Norths Devils. He attended Wavell State High School, St Patrick's College, Shorncliffe and Brisbane Grammar School, where he was the vice-captain of their first XV rugby union team. In 2015, he joined the North Queensland Cowboys academy.

== Playing career ==
=== Early career ===
In 2016, Gilbert played for the Norths Devils Cyril Connell Cup team and was later selected for the Queensland under-16 team. In 2017, he moved up to the Devils' Mal Meninga Cup team and represented the Queensland under-18 team. In 2018, Gilbert moved to Townsville and joined the Townsville Blackhawks. After two games for the club's Mal Meninga Cup side, he moved up to their under-20 team. Later that year he was selected again in the Queensland under-18 team.

On 16 October 2018, Gilbert re-signed with the North Queensland Cowboys, moving up to their NRL squad on a one-year development deal. In 2019, he spent the entire season playing for the Townsville Blackhawks in the Queensland Cup. In July 2019, he was named vice-captain of the Queensland under-20 team. In September 2019, he was named the Queensland Cup Rookie of the Year and was named at lock in the Team of the Year.

On 29 November 2019, Gilbert re-signed with the North Queensland outfit until the end of 2022, joining the club's top-30 squad.

=== North Queensland Cowboys (2020–2022) ===
In Round 4 of the 2020 NRL season, Gilbert made his NRL debut for North Queensland against the Cronulla-Sutherland Sharks. Following his second NRL game, Gilbert was suspended for three weeks for a crusher tackle on New Zealand Warriors prop King Vuniyayawa. In Round 17, he started at second-row for the first time. In his rookie season, Gilbert played twelve games, starting four at second-row.

=== Dolphins (2023–present) ===
Gilbert signed a three-year deal with the Dolphins and returned to his hometown of Brisbane. In round 1 of the 2023 NRL season, Gilbert made his club debut for the Dolphins in their inaugural game in the national competition, defeating the Sydney Roosters 28–18 at Suncorp Stadium. In round 2, he scored a try against the Canberra Raiders at Kayo Stadium. Gilbert's next try was scored in round 6 against the North Queensland Cowboys at Queensland Country Bank Stadium.

In May, Gilbert was selected to play for Queensland as a second row forward in Game I of the 2023 State of Origin series against New South Wales on 31 May at Adelaide Oval in South Australia. During game 1 of the 2023 State of Origin series, Gilbert dislocated his shoulder which required a reconstruction ending his 2023 season. On 26 February 2024, it was confirmed that Gilbert would be ruled out of the entire 2024 NRL season after suffering an ACL injury in a pre-season trial against the New Zealand Warriors.

On 10 June 2025, the Dolphins announced that Gilbert would be ruled out for the rest of the season after tearing his pec. Gilbet played 25 matches for the club in the 2026 NRL season including their preliminary final loss to eventual premiers the Sydney Roosters.

== Achievements and accolades ==
=== Individual ===
- Queensland Cup Rookie of the Year: 2019
- Queensland Cup Team of the Year: 2019

== Statistics ==
=== NRL ===
Season	Team	Matches	T	G	GK %	F/G	Pts
2020	North Queensland	12	0	0	—	0	0
2021	North Queensland	11	0	0	—	0	0
2022	North Queensland	24	3	0	—	0	12
2023	Dolphins	11	2	0	—	0	8
2025	Dolphins	10	0	0	—	0	0
2026	Dolphins	25	1				4
2027	Dolphins						
Career totals		93	56	0	—	0	24
