= Jake Marketo =

Australian rugby league footballer

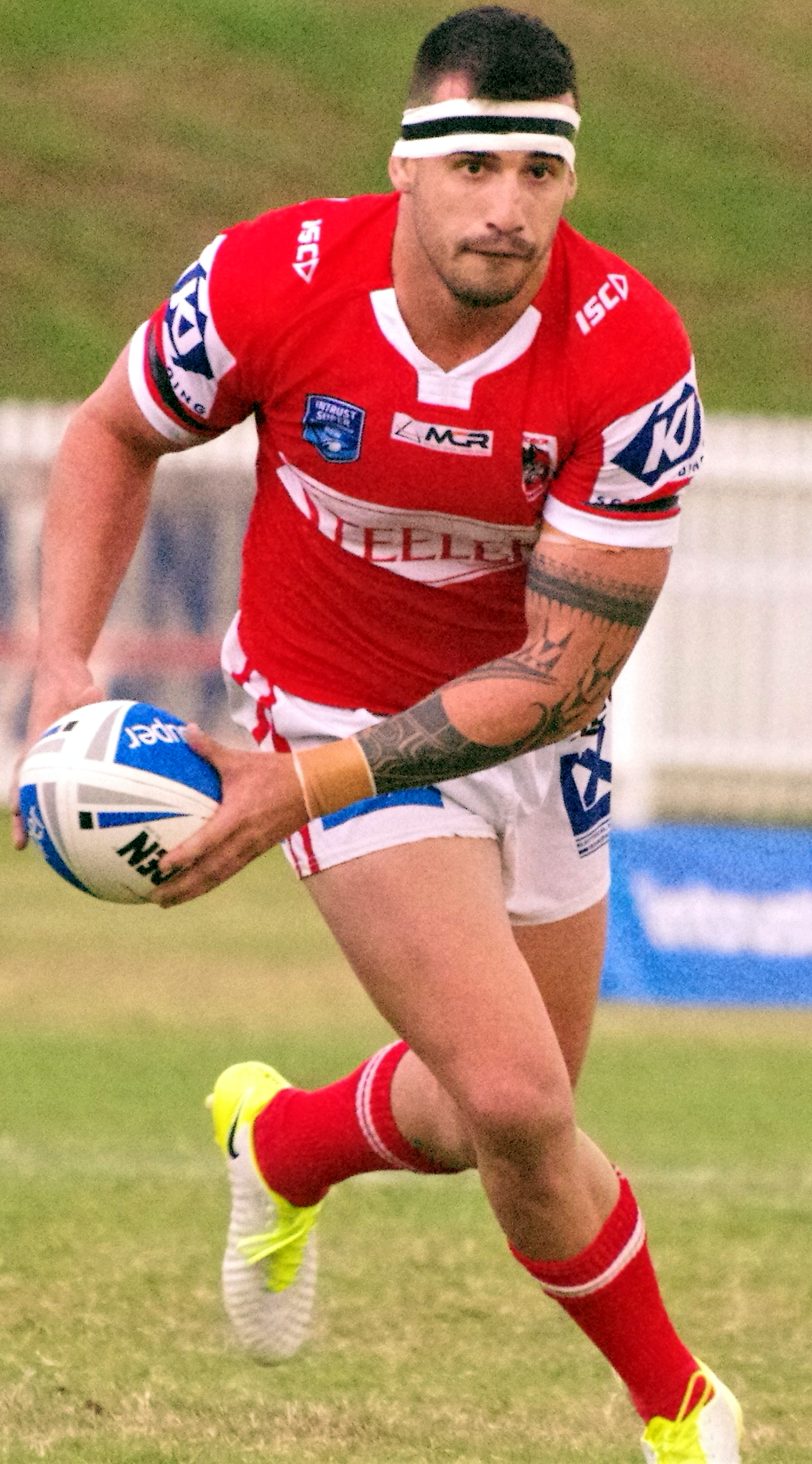

Personal information
- Born: 17 February 1989 (age 36) Wollongong, New South Wales Australia
- Height: 187 cm (6 ft 2 in)
- Weight: 97 kg (15 st 4 lb)

Playing information

Rugby league
- Position: Second-row, Lock, Hooker
Club
Years	Team	Pld	T	G	FG	P
2010–17	St. George Illawarra	52	5	0	0	20
Representative
Years	Team	Pld	T	G	FG	P
2017	City NSW	1	0	0	0	0

Rugby union
- Position: Centre
Club
Years	Team	Pld	T	G	FG	P
2017–18	Timișoara Saracens
- Source: As of 4 March 2018
- Father: Michael Marketo

Jake Marketo (born 17 February 1989) is an Australian professional rugby league footballer who plays for the Townsville Blackhawks in the Intrust Super Cup. He previously played for the St. George Illawarra Dragons in the National Rugby League. Marketo also had a short stint playing rugby union for the Timișoara Saracens in the SuperLiga CEC Bank in Romania. He primarily plays as a lock or second-row but can also play at hooker.

== Early life ==
Born in Wollongong, New South Wales, Australia, Marketo is the son of former Balmain Tigers player Michael Marketo. He played his junior rugby league for Holy Cross Rhinos.

== Playing career ==
=== Rugby league ===
Marketo made his NRL debut for the Dragons in round 11 of the 2010 NRL season, coming off the bench in a 22–14 loss at home to the Canberra Raiders.

Marketo just played one NRL game for the Dragons in 2017 and was axed from the Dragons squad at the end of the year.

=== Rugby Union ===
Marketo signed with Romanian rugby union club Timișoara Saracens in November 2017. He played as a centre.

=== Return To Rugby League ===
After a few weeks training for the Timișoara Saracens, Marketo decided to return to Australia. He signed with the Townsville Blackhawks for the 2018 season.
