= Daniel Strickland =

Australian rugby league footballer

Personal information
- Full name: Daniel Strickland
- Born: 29 October 1979 (age 45); Townsville, Queensland, Australia

Playing information
- Position: Prop, Second-row, Lock
Club
Years	Team	Pld	T	G	FG	P
2000–06	North Qld Cowboys	62	2	0	0	8
- Source: As of 15 January 2019

Daniel Strickland (born 29 October 1979) is an Australian former professional rugby league footballer who played as a prop, second-row or lock in the 2000s. Strickland played for the North Queensland Cowboys in the NRL throughout his professional career between 2000 and 2006.

== Playing career ==
Strickland made his debut for North Queensland in Round 18 2000 against Cronulla which ended in a 42–6 loss. North Queensland went on to claim the wooden spoon in Strickland's first season at the club.

Strickland featured more prominently for North Queensland in the coming seasons but missed out on playing in the club's first finals campaign in 2004. Strickland missed the entire 2005 season as North Queensland reached their first ever grand final. Strickland returned in 2006 making one final appearance for the club which was a 26–4 loss to Cronulla.

In 2016, Strickland played in the Queensland Cup with Townsville Blackhawks.
