= Joe Boyce =

Australian rugby league footballer

Personal information
- Full name: Joseph Boyce
- Born: 1 February 1994 (age 32) Sunshine Coast, Queensland, Australia
- Height: 186 cm (6 ft 1 in)
- Weight: 98 kg (15 st 6 lb)

Playing information
- Position: Lock
Club
| Years | Team | Pld | T | G | FG | P |
|---|---|---|---|---|---|---|
| 2015 | Brisbane Broncos | 1 | 0 | 0 | 0 | 0 |
Representative
| Years | Team | Pld | T | G | FG | P |
| 2017 | Queensland Residents | 1 | 0 | 0 | 0 | 0 |
- Source: As of 7 January 2024

Joe Boyce (born 1 February 1994) is an Australian professional rugby league footballer who plays for the Townsville Blackhawks in the Queensland Cup. Primarily a lock, he previously played for the Brisbane Broncos in the National Rugby League.

== Background ==
Born on the Sunshine Coast, Queensland, Boyce played his junior football for the Sunshine Coast Sea Eagles, Nambour Crushers and Norths Devils, before being signed by the Newcastle Knights.

== Playing career ==
=== Early career ===
After trialling with the Penrith Panthers, a Newcastle Knights scout signed Boyce to a two-year contract starting in 2013. In 2013 and 2014, he played for Newcastle's NYC team. In October 2014, he signed a two-year contract with the Brisbane Broncos starting in 2015, following Newcastle coach Wayne Bennett to Brisbane.

=== 2015 ===
In round 11 of the 2015 NRL season, Boyce made his NRL debut for Brisbane against his former club, the Newcastle Knights.

=== 2018-2022 ===
After a number of seasons playing for the Broncos' feeder clubs, Boyce joined the Townsville Blackhawks for the 2018 season. Boyce played with the Townsville club up until the end of 2022 making 69 appearances.
