= Josh Chudleigh =

Australian rugby league footballer

Personal information
- Born: 8 April 1994 (age 31); Canberra, Australian Capital Territory
- Height: 179 cm (5 ft 10 in)
- Weight: 92 kg (14 st 7 lb)

Playing information
- Position: Hooker
Club
Years	Team	Pld	T	G	FG	P
2016	North Qld Cowboys	1	1	0	0	4
- Source: As of 8 October 2018

Josh Chudleigh (born 8 April 1994) is an Australian professional rugby league footballer who plays for the Townsville Blackhawks in the Queensland Cup. Primarily a hooker, he previously played for the North Queensland Cowboys.

== Background ==
Born in Canberra, Australian Capital Territory, Chudleigh played his junior rugby league for the Bungendore Tigers before being signed by the Canberra Raiders.

== Playing career ==
=== Early career ===
In 2010, Chudleigh played for Canberra's Harold Matthews Cup side. In 2012, he played for their SG Ball Cup side, scoring a try in that season's Grand Final, which they lost to the Balmain Tigers. In 2013, after taking an extended break from rugby league, Chudleigh joined the Queanbeyan Blues in the Canberra Rugby League competition after being coaxed back to the sport by former Raiders' captain and then-Queanbeyan coach Simon Woolford. In October 2013, he signed a one-year contract with the North Queensland Cowboys, joining their NYC side. He played 22 games for them in 2014, winning the club's NYC Player of the Year award, being named in the Junior Kangaroos train-on squad and earning an NRL contract.

In 2015, Chudleigh spent the year in the Queensland Cup with North Queensland feeder side, the Mackay Cutters. He was named at hooker in the Queensland Cup Team of the Year. In September 2015, he re-signed with North Queensland for a further year.

=== 2016 ===
In round 18 of the 2016 NRL season, Chudleigh made his NRL debut for North Queensland against his former club, the Canberra Raiders, scoring a try. On 22 August, Chudleigh re-signed with North Queensland for a further two seasons, until the end of 2018.

On 31 August, Chudleigh won the Courier Mail Medal for Queensland Cup Player of the Year and was named at hooker in the Team of the Year.

In December 2016, Chudleigh ruptured his anterior cruciate ligament (ACL) in training, ruling him out for the 2017 season.

=== 2018 ===
In round 2 of the Queensland Cup season, Chudleigh made a successful return from injury in the Mackay Cutters' 26–24 loss to the Easts Tigers.

Two weeks after his return, in a game against the Northern Pride, he ruptured his ACL for the second time, ruling him out for the remainder of the 2018 season.

On 13 September 2018, he was announced by North Queensland as one of nine players leaving the club at the end of the 2018 season.

=== 2019-2022 ===
In 2019, Chudleigh joined the Townsville Blackhawks for the 2019 season. He would continue to play with Townsville up until the end of 2022.

== Achievements and accolades ==
=== Individual ===
- Courier Mail Medal: 2016
- Queensland Cup Team of the Year: 2015, 2016
- North Queensland Cowboys NYC Player of the Year: 2014

== Statistics ==
=== NRL ===
Statistics are correct to the end of the 2018 season

Season	Team	Matches	T	G	GK %	F/G	Pts
2016	North Queensland	1	1	0	—	0	4
Career totals		1	1	0	—	0	4
