= Kyle Laybutt =

PNG international rugby league footballer

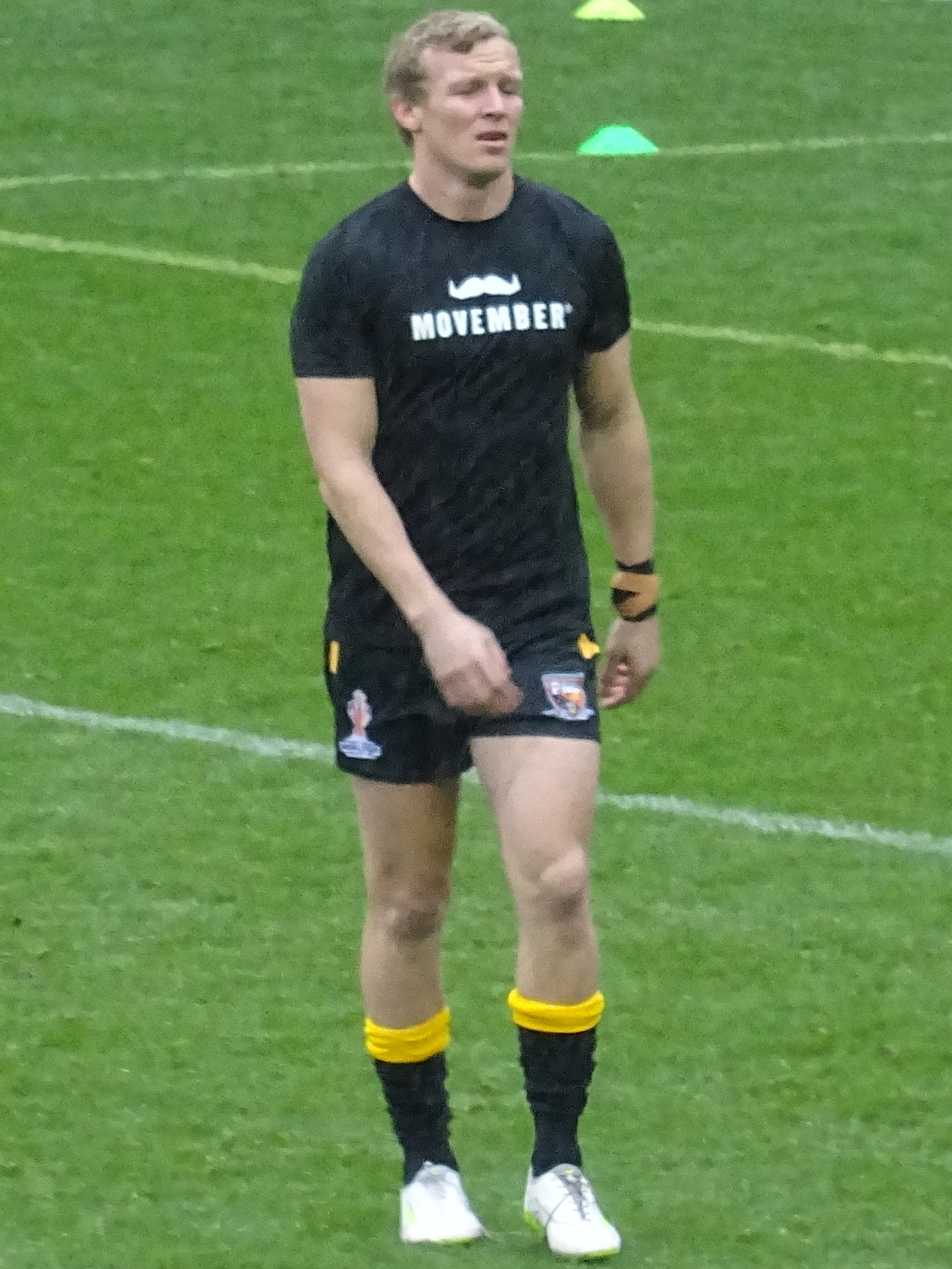

Personal information
- Born: 26 September 1995 (age 31) Bundaberg, Queensland, Australia
- Height: 189 cm (6 ft 2 in)
- Weight: 94 kg (14 st 11 lb)

Playing information
- Position: Five-eighth, Halfback, Lock, Centre
Club
| Years | Team | Pld | T | G | FG | P |
|---|---|---|---|---|---|---|
| 2017–18 | Nth Qld Cowboys | 2 | 0 | 0 | 0 | 0 |
Representative
| Years | Team | Pld | T | G | FG | P |
| 2017 | Queensland Residents | 1 | 0 | 0 | 0 | 0 |
| 2018–25 | PNG Prime Minister's XIII | 4 | 1 | 1 | 0 | 6 |
| 2019–24 | Papua New Guinea | 11 | 2 | 10 | 0 | 18 |
| 2019 | Papua New Guinea 9s | 3 | 1 | 2 | 0 | 9 |
| 2024 | Indigenous All Stars | 1 | 0 | 0 | 0 | 0 |
- Source: As of 12 October 2025
- Education: Bundaberg State High School
- Relatives: Zac Laybutt (brother)

Kyle Laybutt (born 26 September 1995) is a Papua New Guinea international rugby league footballer who played as a lock, centre, five-eighth, halfback and hooker for the Townsville Blackhawks in the Queensland Cup.

He previously played for the North Queensland Cowboys in the NRL. In 2024 he made his debut for the Indigenous All Stars, a team representing Aboriginal Australians and Torres Strait Islanders.

== Background ==
Laybutt was born in Bundaberg, Queensland, Australia, and is of Indigenous and Papua New Guinean descent.

He played junior rugby league for the Western Suburbs Panthers and attended Bundaberg State High School.

== Playing career ==
=== Early career ===
In 2011, Laybutt was a member of the Central United Cyril Connell Cup team. In 2012, he was a part of the Canterbury-Bankstown Bulldogs SG Ball Cup summer squad but did not play a game for the club. He returned to Queensland in 2013 and played for Central United's Mal Meninga Cup team. That year he played for the Queensland under-18 Maroons in their win over the New South Wales Country Under-18s team.

In 2015, Laybutt joined the North Queensland Cowboys Holden Cup (Under-20s) team mid-season, playing 16 games and scoring 10 tries. Despite playing just half the season, he earned an NRL-contract with the club, signing a two-year deal. He joined North Queensland's NRL squad in 2016 and spent the season playing for their feeder club, the Townsville Blackhawks, in the Queensland Cup.

=== 2017 ===
On 11 February, Laybutt kicked the game-winning field goal in an 11-10 pre-season trial win over the Sydney Roosters. After starting the season once again with the Blackhawks, Laybutt represented the Queensland Residents, scoring a try in their 36–6 win over the New South Wales Residents team.

In Round 15 of the 2017 NRL season, Laybutt made his NRL debut against the Melbourne Storm at AAMI Park. On 6 September, he re-signed with the North Queensland club until the end of the 2018 NRL season.

=== 2018 ===
Laybutt spent the 2018 season playing for North Queensland's feeder club, the Mackay Cutters. On 13 September 2018, he was announced by North Queensland as one of nine players leaving the club at the end of the 2018 season.

On 6 October, Laybutt came off the bench for the PNG Prime Minister's XIII and scored a try in their loss to the Prime Minister's XIII.

=== 2021 ===
In 2021, Laybutt underwent pre-season training with North Queensland before returning to the Blackhawks. He later re-joined North Queensland's squad on a training contract until the end of the season and was named as a reserve in their Round 14 game against Manly.

=== 2025 ===
On 8 January 2025, Laybutt announced his retirement from the NRL. Laybutt played for the Southern Suburbs Bulls in the Townsville District Rugby League A Grade competition, appearing in their grand final win. In October, Laybutt was selected for the PNG Prime Minister's XIII.

== Statistics ==
=== NRL ===
| Season | Team | Matches | T | G | GK % | F/G | Pts |
|---|---|---|---|---|---|---|---|
| 2017 | North Queensland | 2 | 0 | 0 | – | 0 | 0 |
| Career totals | | 2 | 0 | 0 | — | 0 | 0 |

=== Reserve Grade ===
| Year | Team | Games | Tries | Goals | FGs | Pts |
|---|---|---|---|---|---|---|
| 2016 | Townsville Blackhawks | 17 | 7 | 47 | | 122 |
| 2017 | Townsville Blackhawks | 15 | 3 | 2 | | 16 |
| 2018 | Mackay Cutters | 14 | 4 | 11 | | 38 |
| 2019 | Townsville Blackhawks | 21 | 2 | 4 | | 16 |
| 2020 | Townsville Blackhawks | 1 | | 2 | | 4 |
| 2021 | Townsville Blackhawks | 15 | 5 | 1 | | 22 |
| 2022 | Townsville Blackhawks | 17 | 3 | 5 | | 22 |
| 2023 | Sunshine Coast Falcons | 6 | 1 | 1 | | 6 |
| 2024 | Townsville Blackhawks | 18 | 2 | | 1 | 9 |
| | Totals | 124 | 27 | 73 | 1 | 255 |
