= Sione Lousi =

Tonga international rugby league footballer

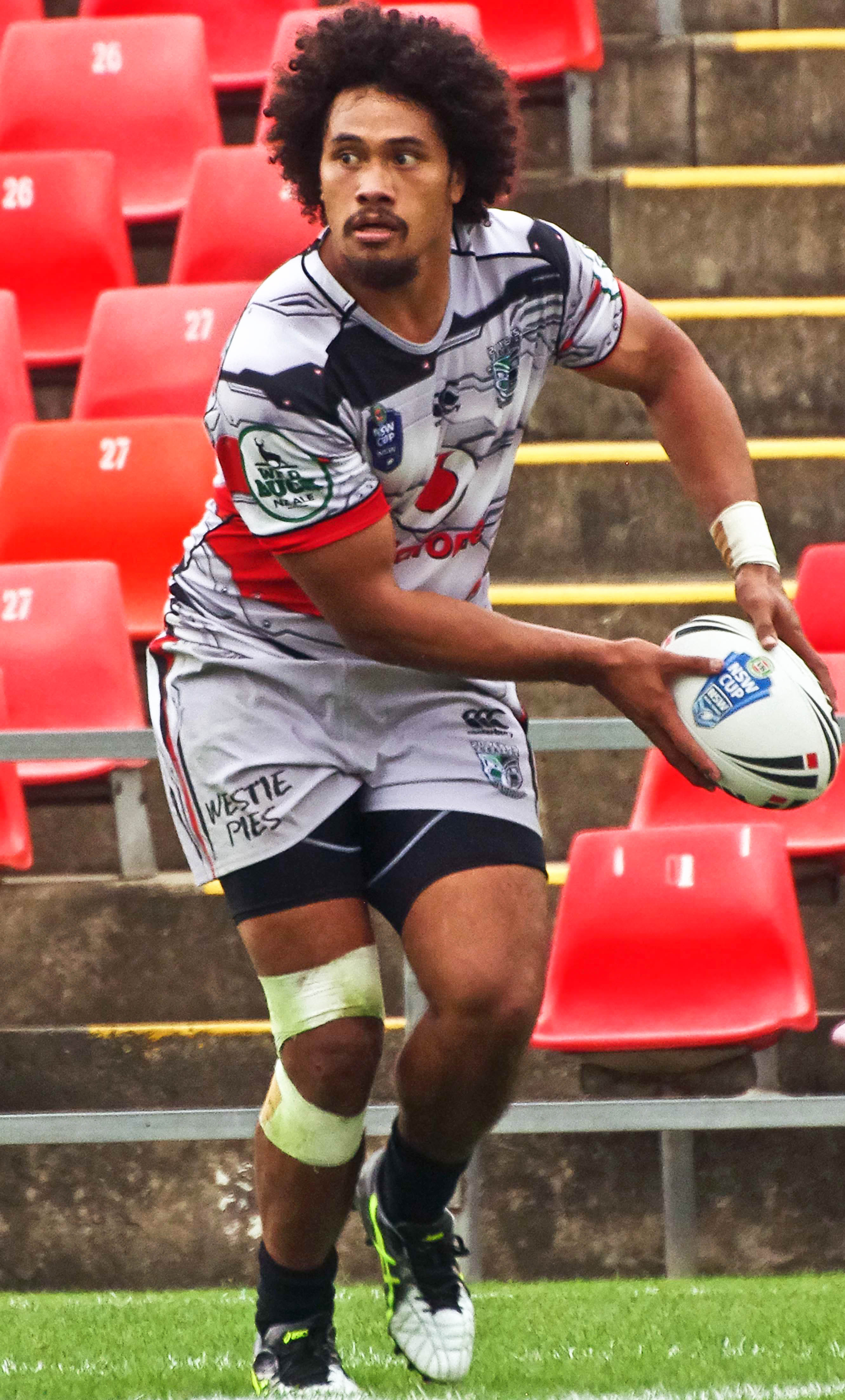

Personal information
- Born: 8 October 1989 (age 37) Auckland, New Zealand

Playing information
- Height: 191 cm (6 ft 3 in)
- Weight: 106 kg (16 st 10 lb)
- Position: Second-row, Prop, Lock
Club
Years	Team	Pld	T	G	FG	P
2010–16	New Zealand Warriors	50	3	0	0	12
Representative
Years	Team	Pld	T	G	FG	P
2010	Tonga	1	0	0	0	0
- Education: St. Paul's College, Auckland
- Relatives: Sam Lousi (brother)

Sione Lousi (born 8 October 1989) is a former Tonga international rugby league footballer who last played for the Townsville Blackhawks in the Queensland Cup. He previously played in the National Rugby League (NRL) for the New Zealand Warriors.

== Background ==
He is the brother of Sam Lousi.

== Early years ==
Lousi attended St Paul's College, a school known for its rugby league sides. From here he played for the Bay Roskill Vikings and Richmond Bulldogs in the Auckland Rugby League competition and joined the New Zealand Warriors Allied Workforce development squad.

== Playing career ==
With the creation of the Toyota Cup in 2008 Lousi joined the Warriors under-20 side. In 2009 he played in 17 games for the side and trained with the senior squad in the 2010 pre-season, playing in all three trials. He finished his Toyota Cup career with thirty three appearances and two tries.

Lousi made his first grade debut in round 1 of the 2010 NRL season against the Gold Coast.

In 2010 Lousi was selected for the Tongan side, playing one test against Samoa.

He was released by the Warriors at the end of the 2016 season and joined the Townsville Blackhawks in the Queensland Cup. Lousi played with Townsville until the end of the 2021 season making a total of 70 appearances in the Queensland Cup.
