= Jaelen Feeney =

Indigenous Australian rugby league footballer

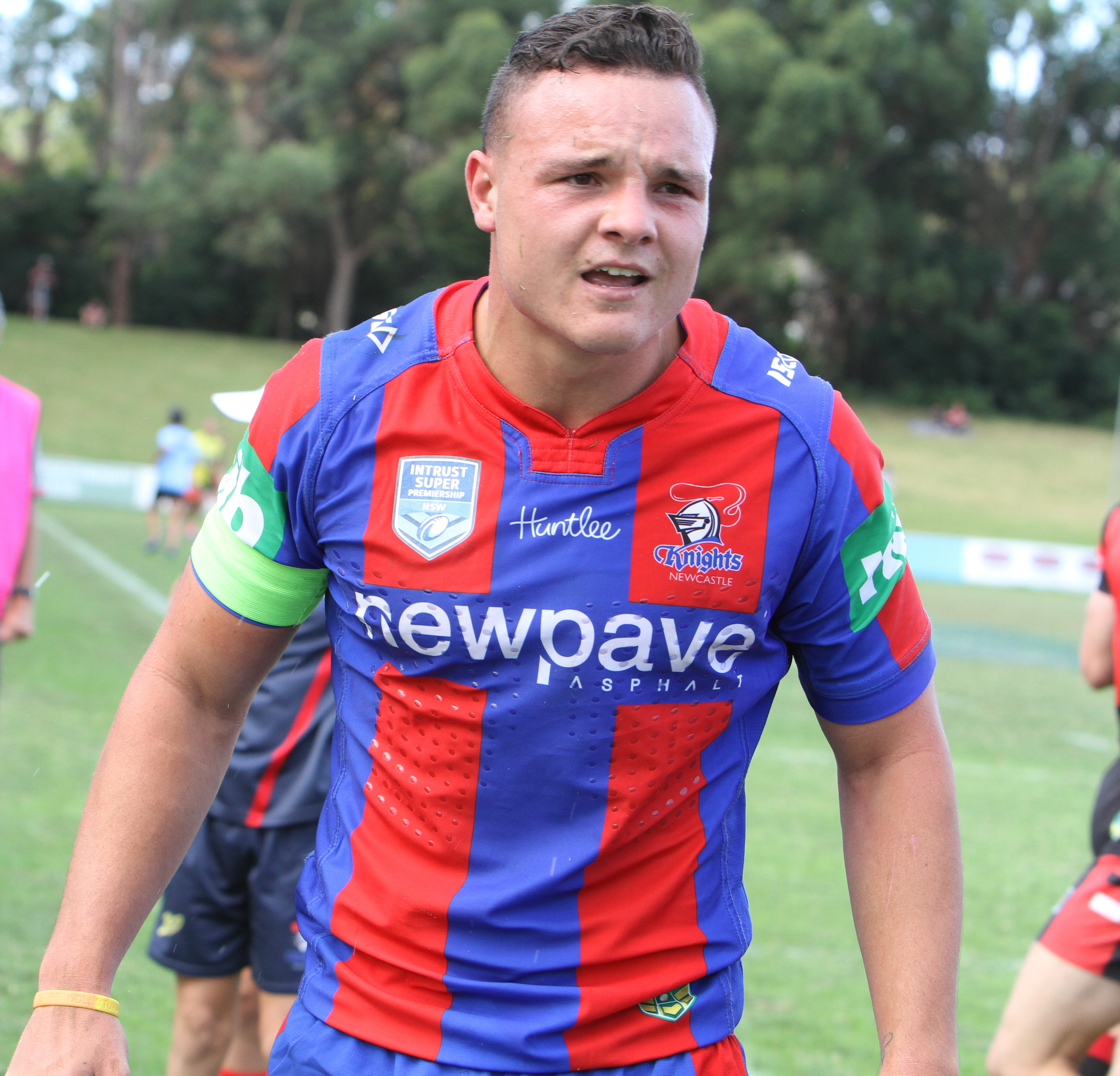

Personal information
- Born: 14 October 1994 (age 31) Sydney, New South Wales, Australia
- Height: 190 cm (6 ft 3 in)
- Weight: 94 kg (14 st 11 lb)

Playing information
- Position: Five-eighth, Halfback, Fullback
Club
Years	Team	Pld	T	G	FG	P
2016–17	Newcastle Knights	26	1	0	0	4
- Source: As of 19 May 2019

Jaelen Feeney (born 14 October 1994) is an Indigenous Australian professional rugby league footballer who plays as a five-eighth, halfback and fullback for the Townsville Blackhawks in the Queensland Cup. He previously played for the Newcastle Knights in the NRL.

== Background ==
Born in Sydney, New South Wales, Feeney is of Indigenous Australian descent and moved to Queensland at a young age. He played his junior rugby league for the Nerang Roosters, while attending Keebra Park State High School and Palm Beach Currumbin, before being signed by the Canterbury-Bankstown Bulldogs.

== Playing career ==
=== Early career ===
In 2013, Feeney played for the Canterbury-Bankstown Bulldogs' NYC team. In 2014, he joined the Newcastle Knights and played for their NYC team. On 3 May 2014, he played for the Queensland under-20s team against the New South Wales under-20s team. In 2015, he graduated to the Knights' New South Wales Cup team. On 3 September 2015, he re-signed with the Knights on a two-year contract. On 27 September, he played in the Knights' 2015 New South Wales Cup Grand Final win over the Wyong Roos.

=== 2016 ===
In round 1 of the 2016 NRL season, Feeney made his NRL debut for Newcastle against the Gold Coast Titans. Feeney played a total of six appearances for Newcastle in the 2016 NRL season .

=== 2017 ===
After playing a further 20 NRL games for Newcastle as they finished with the Wooden Spoon, Feeney left the club at the end of the 2017 NRL season.

=== 2018 ===
Ahead of the 2018 season, Feeney joined the Townsville Blackhawks in the Queensland Cup.
