= Kalifa Faifai Loa =

NZ & Samoa international rugby league footballer

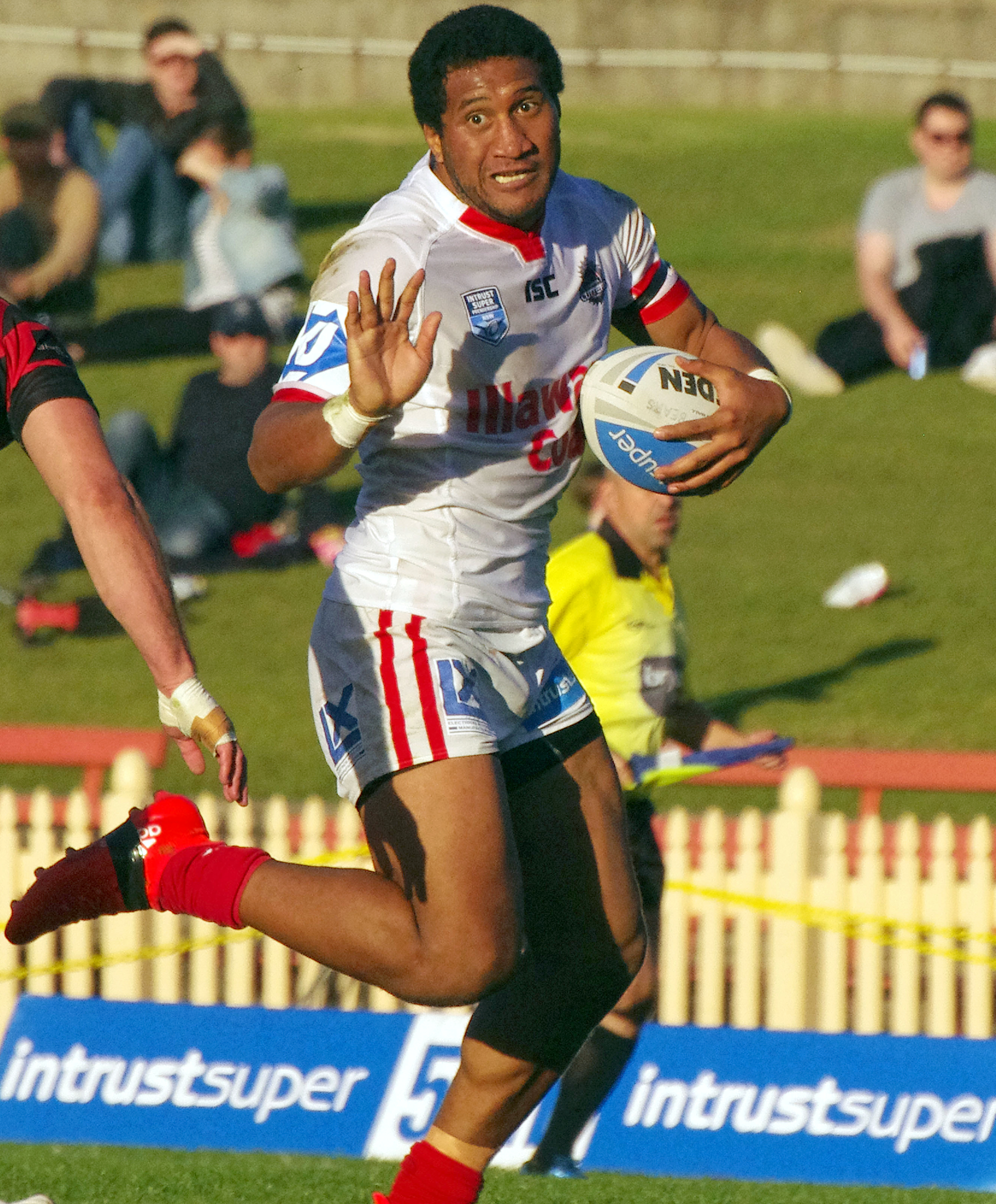

Personal information
- Born: 29 January 1991 (age 35) Wellington, New Zealand
- Height: 180 cm (5 ft 11 in)
- Weight: 87 kg (13 st 10 lb)

Playing information
- Position: Wing
Club
Years	Team	Pld	T	G	FG	P
2010	St. George Illawarra	2	2	0	0	8
2011–13	North Qld Cowboys	37	15	0	0	30
2014–15	Gold Coast Titans	19	9	0	0	36
2016–17	St. George Illawarra	17	7	0	0	28
	Total	75	33	0	0	102
Representative
Years	Team	Pld	T	G	FG	P
2011	New Zealand	2	1	0	0	4
2013	Samoa	1	0	0	0	0
2014–18	Queensland Residents	3	2	2	0	12
- Source: As of 7 January 2024
- Relatives: Jeremy Smith (cousin)

Kalifa Faifai Loa (born 29 January 1991) is a professional rugby league footballer who plays as a winger for the Townsville Blackhawks in the Queensland Cup. A New Zealand and Samoa international representative, he previously played for the North Queensland Cowboys, Gold Coast Titans and the St. George Illawarra Dragons. Switched codes in 2020 playing in the Townsville district rugby union for the Western Suburbs Dragons and scoring 14 tries in 14 games at full back

== Background ==
Born in Wellington, New Zealand, Faifai Loa is of Samoan and Māori descent and played his junior football for the Marist Saints in the Auckland Rugby League competition, before being signed by the Newcastle Knights. He played for the Knights' Toyota Cup team in 2008, scoring 7 tries in 10 games.

== Playing career ==
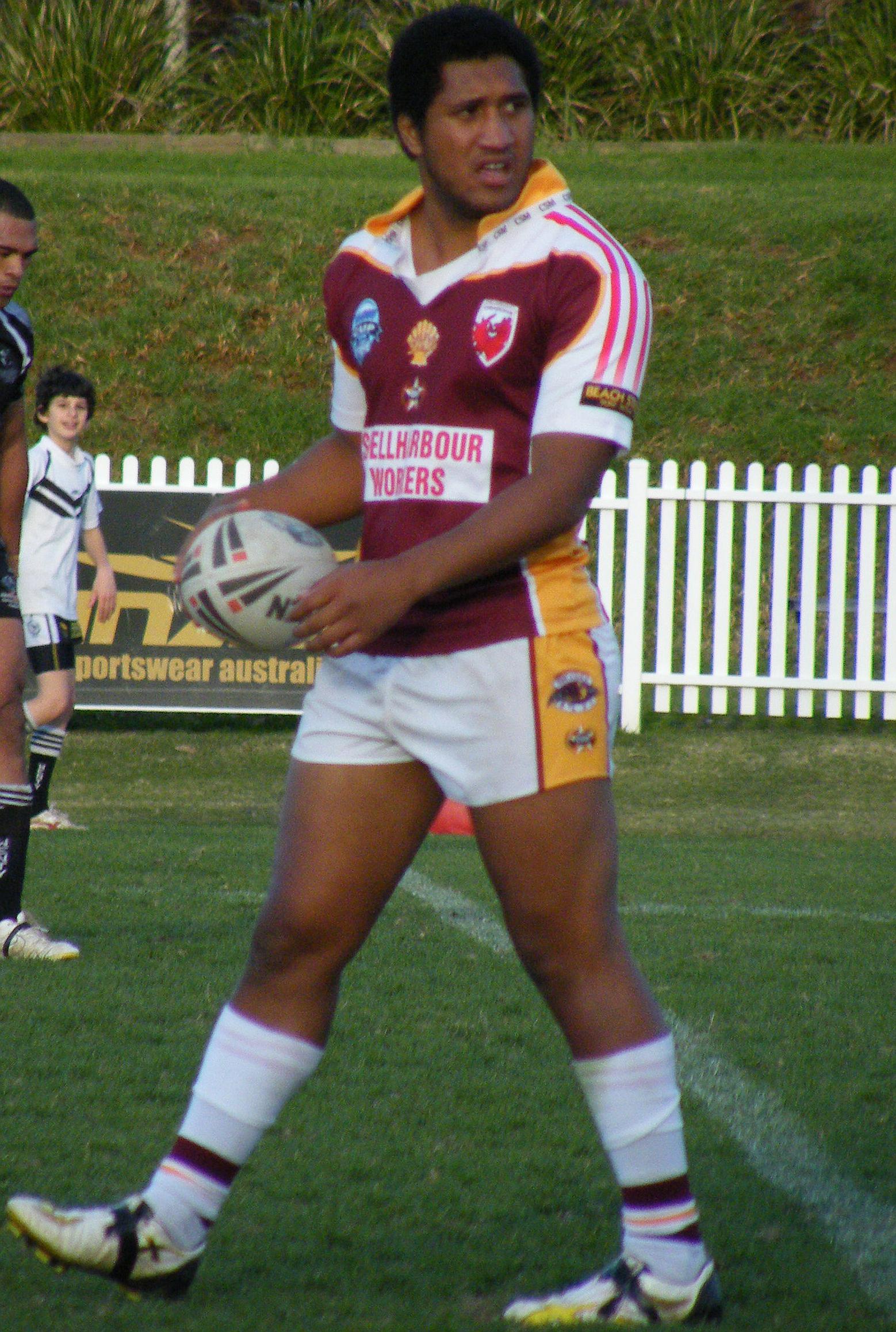
Faifai Loa playing for the Shellharbour City Dragons in 2010

=== St. George Illawarra Dragons ===
Faifai Loa returned to New Zealand before signing a contract with the St. George Illawarra Dragons starting in 2009. As a 20-year-old, Faifai Loa scored 12 tries and broke near 100 tackles throughout the 2009 Toyota Cup season. In 2010 he averaged over 200 metres a game and scored 11 tries in 13 appearances. Altogether, he scored 29 tries in 45 games and being named in the 2010 National Youth Competition Team of the Year. In Round 11 of the 2010 NRL season he made his NRL debut for St. George Illawarra against the Canberra Raiders. In his second NRL game, Faifai Loa scored 2 tries. At the end of 2010, it appeared that salary cap demands would force him out of the St. George club. Faifai Loa is cousins with fellow New Zealand international Jeremy Smith. Faifai Loa lived with Smith when they were playing for the St. George Illawarra Dragons.

In July 2010, Faifai Loa signed a two-year contract with the North Queensland Cowboys starting in 2011.

=== North Queensland Cowboys ===
In round 3 of the 2011 NRL season, Faifai Loa made his debut for the North Queensland Cowboys against the Melbourne Storm.

After the 2011 season, Faifai Loa was selected to make his international debut for New Zealand in the test match against Australia at Ausgrid Stadium. He was then selected in the New Zealand squad for the 2011 Four Nations tournament, scoring his first international try in the tournament's opening match against Australia.

In December 2011, Faifai Loa re-signed with the North Queensland club for two years.

On 20 April 2013 he played for Samoa in the Pacific Rugby League International against Tonga.

=== Gold Coast Titans ===
Faifai Loa played nine games for the Gold Coast in 2014, scoring 4 tries.

In 2015, Faifai Loa represented the Queensland Residents. He went on to play 7 NRL games for the Gold Coast in the same year, scoring 5 tries.

=== Return to the St. George Illawarra Dragons ===
On 12 October 2015, Faifai Loa signed a two-year contract with the St. George Illawarra Dragons starting in 2016, returning to his first team. He was a member of the Illawarra Cutters 2016 Intrust Super Premiership grand final winning side.

=== Townsville Blackhawks ===
In October 2017, Faifai Loa signed with Intrust Super Cup side, the Townsville Blackhawks for the 2018 season. In his first season with the 'Hawks he would score 70 season points from 16 tries and 8 goals.

2019 Season

In his 2019 Faifai would make 25 appearances. He scored 13 and made 8 conversions for a season tally of 68 points. Out of the 25 games he played for the 2 games for the finals appearance the Blackhawks made. But ultimately coming short to the grand final from in their 14- 26 loss to the Wynnum Manly Seagulls.

2020 Season

Due to the COVID-19 outbreak the Intrust Super Cup was cancelled just before round 1. Therefore, Kalifa took up club rugby in TDRU (Townsville and District Rugby Union) and played for Western Suburbs.

2021 Season

In 2021 Kalifa played 16 games for the 'Hawks scoring 12 tries and only having 1 conversion making his season points 50. He played in the Blackhawks one only finals game appearance against Souths Logan Magpies scoring a try but losing the game 30-24
