= Sam Hoare (rugby league) =

Australian rugby league footballer

Personal information
- Full name: Samuel Hoare
- Born: 12 August 1991 (age 34) Rockhampton, Queensland, Australia
- Height: 194 cm (6 ft 4 in)
- Weight: 111 kg (17 st 7 lb)

Playing information
- Position: Prop
Club
Years	Team	Pld	T	G	FG	P
2014–18	North Qld Cowboys	21	0	0	0	0
Representative
Years	Team	Pld	T	G	FG	P
2013	Queensland Residents	1	0	0	0	0
- Source: As of 6 January 2024

Samuel Hoare (born 12 August 1991) is an Australian professional rugby league footballer who plays for the Townsville Blackhawks in the Queensland Cup. Primarily a prop, he previously played for the North Queensland Cowboys.

== Background ==
Born and raised in Rockhampton, Queensland, Hoare played his junior football for the Rockhampton Brothers and attended Emmaus College, Rockhampton before being signed by the North Queensland Cowboys.

== Playing career ==
In 2009, Hoare played for the Townsville Stingers in the Mal Meninga Cup. Later that season, he made his debut for the Cowboys' NYC, for whom he played for until 2011. In 2011, Hoare suffered a season-ending knee injury, missing the NYC Grand Final.

In 2012, Hoare moved into the Cowboys' NRL squad and played for the club's Queensland Cup affiliate, the Mackay Cutters. On 28 June 2012, Hoare re-signed with the Cowboys on a 2-year contract. In 2013, Hoare played for the Queensland Residents and was a member of the Mackay side that won the Queensland Cup Grand Final.

=== 2014 ===
In round 17 of the 2014 NRL season, Hoare made his NRL debut for the Cowboys against the St. George Illawarra Dragons. On 24 July 2014, Hoare re-signed with the Cowboys on a 2-year contract.

In 2014, Hoare was again selected for the Queensland Residents, but had to withdraw due to being called up for his NRL debut.

=== 2015 ===
In January 2015, Hoare was a member of the newly established QAS Emerging Maroons squad. He played 8 games for the Cowboys in 2015, starting at prop in the side's 8–0 win over the Wests Tigers in Round 11.

=== 2016 ===
Hoare started the 2016 season playing for the Cowboys' feeder club, the Townsville Blackhawks, in the Queensland Cup. He was ruled out for the season in March after suffering an anterior cruciate ligament (ACL) knee injury.

=== 2017 ===
In Round 3 of the 2017 NRL season, Hoare returned from his ACL knee injury, coming off the bench in the Cowboys' 30–8 loss to the Manly Sea Eagles. He finished the season with four NRL games, spending the majority of the season with the Townsville Blackhawks.

=== 2018 ===
Hoare played three games for the Cowboys in 2018, spending the majority of the season playing for the Mackay Cutters. In the Cowboys' Round 15 loss to the Warriors he tore his ACL for the third time and was ruled out for the season.

On 13 September 2018, he was announced by the Cowboys as one of nine players leaving the club at the end of the 2018 season.

=== 2019 ===
In 2019, Hoare joined the Townsville Blackhawks for the 2019 season.

== Statistics ==
=== NRL ===
Statistics are correct to the end of the 2018 season

Season	Team	Matches	T	G	GK %	F/G	Pts
2014	North Queensland	6	0	0	—	0	0
2015	North Queensland	8	0	0	—	0	0
2017	North Queensland	4	0	0	—	0	0
2018	North Queensland	3	0	0	—	0	0
Career totals		21	0	0	—	0	0
