= Aaron Payne =

Australian rugby league footballer & coach (born 1982)

Personal information
- Born: 18 November 1982 (age 44) Townsville, Queensland, Australia

Playing information
- Height: 175 cm (5 ft 9 in)
- Weight: 86 kg (13 st 8 lb)
- Position: Hooker, Halfback
Club
Years	Team	Pld	T	G	FG	P
2002–12	North Qld Cowboys	219	25	0	1	101
Representative
Years	Team	Pld	T	G	FG	P
2012	NRL All Stars	1	0	0	0	0

Aaron Payne (born 18 November 1982) is an Australian rugby league coach and former professional player who is the head coach of the Townsville Blackhawks in the Intrust Super Cup. Primarily a hooker, he played his entire career for the North Queensland Cowboys.

== Background ==
Born in Townsville, Queensland, Payne played his junior rugby league for the Central Tigers and attended Kirwan State High School before being signed by the North Queensland Cowboys. His father, Mark, played two games for Queensland in 1979.

== Playing career ==
In 1999, while playing for Centrals, Payne represented the Queensland under-17 team, starting at halfback in a loss to New South Wales. In 2001, he represented the Queensland under-19 team, coming off the bench in a 28–14 win over the Blues.

In Round 12 of the 2002 NRL season, Payne made his NRL debut for the Cowboys in a 40–32 win over the St George Illawarra Dragons. In his rookie season, he played five games, starting one at halfback. In 2003, Payne represented the Queensland Residents team and played four NRL games, scoring two tries.

In 2004, after a permanent move to hooker, Payne became a regular in the Cowboys' side. He played 25 games that season, including the club's first ever finals appearances. His form earned him a spot in Queensland's Emerging Origin squad for the first time.

In 2005, Payne played all 28 games for the Cowboys, including the 2005 NRL Grand Final, in which they lost 16–30 to the Wests Tigers. In 2006, he won the Paul Bowman Medal, the Cowboys Player of the Year award, for the first time. In Round 18 of the 2007 NRL season, Payne played his 100th NRL game in a 16–24 loss to the Brisbane Broncos.

In 2008, in what was a poor season for the Cowboys, Payne won the Paul Bowman Medal for the second time and also received the Players' Player and Club Person of the Year awards. In 2009, Payne played just 16 games due to injury. The injury occurred in a Round 17 win over the Cronulla Sharks, in which Payne was playing his 150th NRL game. The injury ruled him out for the season. In 2010, Payne played 21 games for the club, missing three weeks due to an ankle injury.

Payne is often considered an underrated player, operating in the shadows of high-profile Cowboys players such as Johnathan Thurston and Matt Bowen. Former Australian captain Gorden Tallis has described Payne as the "glue" that holds the Cowboys together. In 2011, he re-signed with the Cowboys for a further season as the club made the finals for the first time in four seasons.

On 4 February 2012, Payne earned the first senior representative honour of his career when he started at hooker for the NRL All Stars in their 36–28 win over the Indigenous All Stars. Payne was a late call-up by All Stars' coach Wayne Bennett for the injured Cameron Smith.

In Round 6 of the 2012 NRL season, Payne played his 200th NRL game, the third Cowboy to do so, in a 18–42 loss to the Melbourne Storm. On 1 August 2012, Payne announced that he would retire at the end of the season. His final game was an 33–16 elimination final win over the Brisbane Broncos at Dairy Farmers Stadium. Payne was injured in the match and missed the rest of the Cowboys finals campaign. For his contribution to the Cowboys, Payne was awarded a life membership with the club, the fourth person at the time to receive the honour.

== Coaching career ==
In 2014, Payne became the head coach of the Cowboys' Academy program, mentoring players from squads in Townsville, Cairns, Mackay, Rockhampton and Brisbane.

On 20 November 2015, he was named as head coach of the club's under-20 side. He coached the side for two seasons, taking them to the finals in both years, before the competition was ended.

On 28 September 2018, he was named as head coach of the Townsville Blackhawks, signing a two-year contract. He replaced inaugural head coach Kristian Woolf. He coached the side to a 3rd place finish in his first season in charge. On 21 July 2020, Payne returned to the Cowboys, joining as an assistant coach for the remainder of the 2020 NRL season.

He returned to the Blackhawks in 2021 as the Head Coach, where he took the club to a 7th placed finish. The side fell outside of the eight the following season, finishing 10th on the ladder with 7 wins and 2 draws (10 losses).

In 2023, Payne joined the Wests Tigers as an assistant coach. He left the club at the end of the 2025 season to return home to Townsville.

== Achievements and accolades ==
=== Individual ===
- Paul Bowman Medal: 2006, 2008
- North Queensland Cowboys Players' Player: 2008
- North Queensland Cowboys Club Person of the Year: 2008

== Statistics ==
=== NRL ===
Season	Team	Matches	T	G	GK %	F/G	Pts
2002	North Queensland	5	0	0	–	0	0
2003	North Queensland	4	2	0	–	0	8
2004	North Queensland	25	4	0	–	0	16
2005	North Queensland	28	5	0	–	0	20
2006	North Queensland	21	6	0	–	0	24
2007	North Queensland	27	0	0	–	1	1
2008	North Queensland	24	1	0	–	0	4
2009	North Queensland	16	4	0	–	0	16
2010	North Queensland	21	0	0	–	0	0
2011	North Queensland	23	2	0	–	0	8
2012	North Queensland	25	1	0	–	0	4
Career totals		219	25	0	–	1	101
