= Townsville Blackhawks =

Australian semi-pro rugby league club, based in Townsville, QLD

Townsville & Districts Blackhawks

Club information
- Full name: Townsville & Districts Blackhawks Rugby League Football Club
- Nickname: Blackhawks
- Colours: Green; Black; White
- Founded: 10 September 2014; 11 years ago
- Website: blackhawkstsv.com.au

Current details
- Ground: Jack Manski Oval, Townsville, Queensland (4,000)
- CEO: Justin Wilkins
- Coach: Terry Campese
- Captain: Josh Chudleigh
- Competition: Intrust Super Cup
- 2022 season: 10th
- Current season

Records
- Premierships (2nd grade): 0
- Runners-up (2nd grade): 1 (2015)
- Wooden spoons (2nd grade): 0
- Most capped: 84 – Kyle Laybutt
- Highest points scorer: 310 – Carlin Anderson

The Townsville & Districts Blackhawks are an Australian semi-professional rugby league football club based in Townsville, Queensland, Australia. They compete in Queensland's top rugby league competition, the Queensland Cup. The club was admitted to the Queensland Cup in September 2014, first competing in the 2015 season. The side plays their home games at Jack Manski Oval.

== History ==
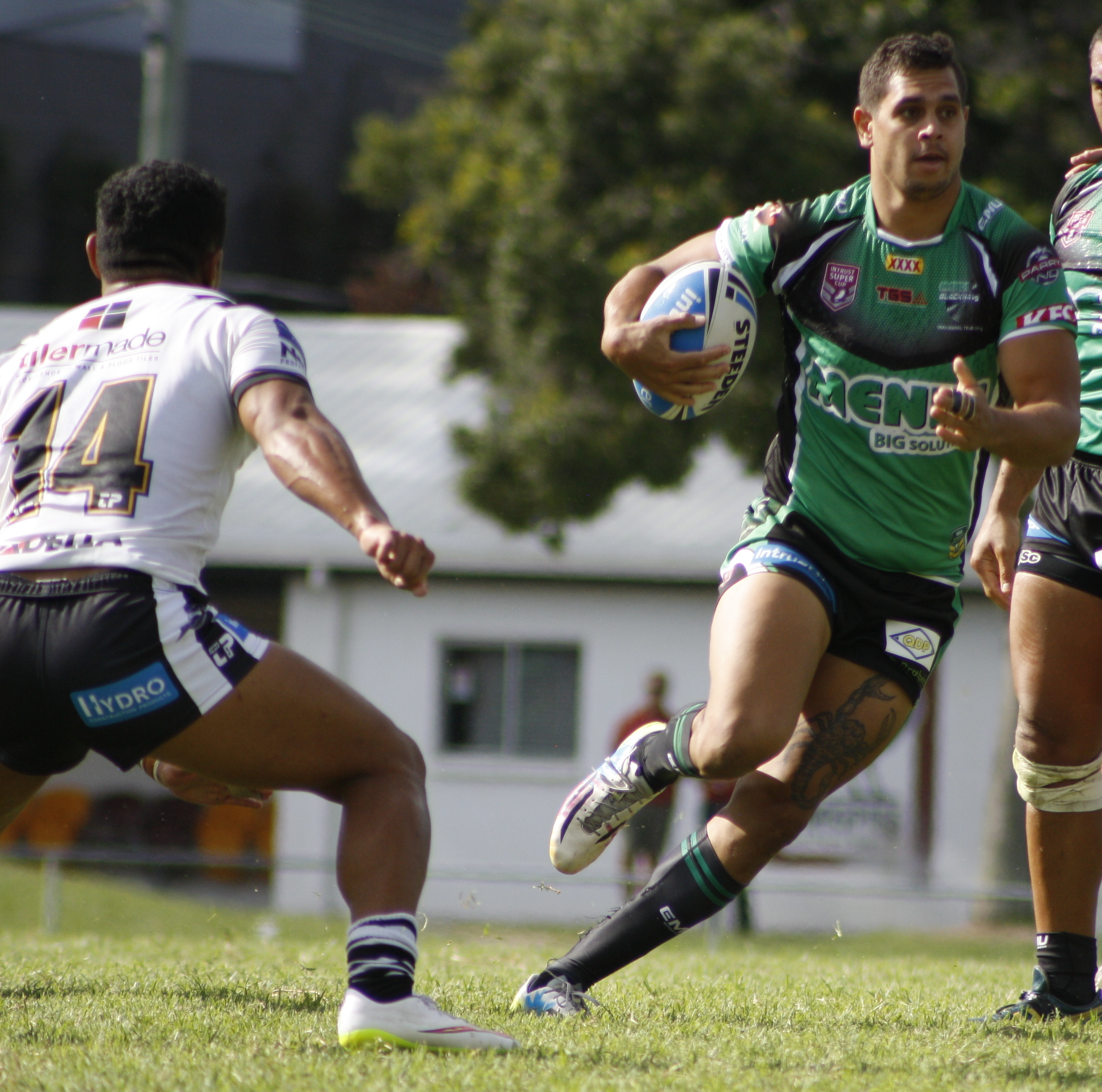
Former Blackhawks player Noel Underwood, 2015

The beginnings of a Townsville team's bid to return to the Queensland Cup date back to 2007, when the Townsville-based North Queensland Young Guns folded at the end of the season. Before the Young Guns entered the competition in 2002, Townsville was represented in the Queensland Cup by the Townsville Stingers, who only lasted one season in 1998. In 2008, the Queensland Cup expanded to Cairns with the Northern Pride and Mackay with the Mackay Cutters. Both clubs became feeder sides for the Townsville-based NRL club, the North Queensland Cowboys.

In 2012, the Townsville Brothers League club sent a letter to Townsville & Districts Rugby League (TDRL) chairman Ross Anderson outlining their interest in joining the Queensland Cup.

On 10 September 2014, Queensland Rugby League chairman Peter Betros announced that the Brothers-led Townsville Blackhawks bid had been successful and the side would compete in the 2015 competition. The club will be backed by the North Queensland Cowboys, who will use the Blackhawks as one of their feeder sides, along with the Pride and the Cutters.

On 29 September 2014, former North Queensland Cowboys Under 20s head coach and Brisbane Broncos assistant coach Kristian Woolf was announced as the inaugural head coach of the Blackhawks.

On 16 October 2014, the Blackhawks announced their first six signings for their inaugural season. They included former NRL players Tom Humble, Anthony Mitchell and Ricky Thorby, former North Queensland Cowboys Under 20s players Corey Jensen and Chris McLean, and United States international Taylor Welch.

On 28 February 2015, Daniel Beasley was named inaugural club captain at the team's season launch.

On 7 March 2015, the Blackhawks played their first Queensland Cup game, defeating the Mackay Cutters 30-16 at Jack Manski Oval. Jahrome Hughes scored the club's first try.

The Blackhawks finished their inaugural season as minor premiers and runners-up in the Grand Final, losing to the Ipswich Jets.

On 9 November 2015, it was announced that Townsville's Cyril Connell (under-16) and Mal Meninga (under-18) Cup sides, formerly known as the Townsville Stingers, will now be known as the Townsville & Districts Blackhawks in their respective competitions.

On 28 September 2018, Aaron Payne was announced as the club's second head coach, after inaugural coach Kristian Woolf joined the Newcastle Knights NRL side as an assistant coach.

== Season summaries ==
P=Premiers, R=Runners-Up, M=Minor Premierships, F=Finals Appearance, W=Wooden Spoons (brackets represent finals games)
Competition	Games Played	Games Won	Games Drawn	Games Lost	Ladder Position	P	R	M	F	W	Coach	Captain(s)	Details
2015 Queensland Cup	23 (2)	19 (1)	1	3 (1)	1 / 14		♦	♦	♦		Kristian Woolf	Daniel Beasley	2015 Townsville Blackhawks season
2016 Queensland Cup	23 (2)	16 (1)	1	6 (1)	3 / 14				♦		Kristian Woolf	Glenn Hall, Anthony Mitchell	2016 Townsville Blackhawks season
2017 Queensland Cup	23 (1)	12	2	9 (1)	6 / 14				♦		Kristian Woolf	Daniel Beasley	2017 Townsville Blackhawks season
2018 Queensland Cup	23 (1)	15	0	8 (1)	3 / 14				♦		Kristian Woolf	Andrew Niemoeller	2018 Townsville Blackhawks season
2019 Queensland Cup	23 (2)	17 (1)	0	6 (1)	4 / 14				♦		Aaron Payne	Sam Hoare	2019 Townsville Blackhawks season
2020 Queensland Cup	1	1	0	0	N/A						Aaron Payne	Sam Hoare	2020 Townsville Blackhawks season
2021 Queensland Cup	17 (1)	9	1	7 (1)	7 / 14				♦		Aaron Payne	Sam Hoare	2021 Townsville Blackhawks season

== Coaches ==
The Blackhawks' current coach, Terry Campese, is the third in the club's history. Kristian Woolf is their longest serving coach.

No	Coach	Tenure	Matches	Won	Drawn	Lost	Win %
1	Kristian Woolf	2015–2018	98	64	4	30	65%
2	Aaron Payne	2019–2023	44	28	1	15	64%
3	Terry Campese	2024–present					

== Emblems and colours ==
Despite being backed by the Townsville Brothers League Club, the bid team adopted a new name, logo and colour scheme for the club. The Blackhawks moniker was chosen after Matt Cocker, a local firefighter at Townsville Airport, won a "name the team" competition in 2012. The city of Townsville has a military history and is home to an RAAF Base. The club's primary colours are green, black and white and their major sponsor is Mendi Construction, who are based in Townsville.

== Honours ==
- Runners Up: 1

2015

- Minor Premiership: 1

2015

== Statistics and Records ==
Biggest Wins

Margin	Opponent	Score	Venue	Date
72	Souths Logan Magpies	72–0	Jack Manski Oval	9 July 2022
72	Burleigh Bears	78–6	Jack Manski Oval	9 May 2015
62	Central Queensland Capras	74–12	Alec Inch Oval	23 July 2016
54	Northern Pride	60–6	Jack Manski Oval	14 July 2019

Biggest Losses

Margin	Opponent	Score	Venue	Date
38	PNG Hunters	4–42	National Football Stadium	28 May 2017
26	Sunshine Coast Falcons	16–42	Sunshine Coast Stadium	26 August 2017
24	Norths Devils	14–38	Jack Manski Oval	20 March 2022
24	Sunshine Coast Falcons	10–34	Jack Manski Oval	19 May 2019

Most Consecutive Wins

- 8, 9 June 2019 – 10 August 2019
- 8, 22 March 2015 – 17 May 2015

Most Consecutive Losses

- 4, 10 April 2021 – 9 May 2021
- 3, 4 August 2018 – 18 August 2018
- 3, 17 March 2018 – 31 March 2018
- 3, 12 August 2017 – 3 September 2017

Most Games for Club

- 84, Kyle Laybutt (2016–2017, 2019–2022)
- 79, Corey Jensen (2015–2019, 2021)
- 75, Michael Parker-Walshe (2015–2017, 2019)
- 72, Anthony Mitchell (2015–2017)
- 70, Sione Lousi (2017–2021)

Most Tries for Club

- 70, Jonathon Reuben (2015–2018)
- 53, Kalifa Faifai Loa (2018–2022)
- 42, Zac Santo (2015, 2018–2019)
- 36, Michael Parker-Walshe (2015–2017, 2019)
- 35, Jaelen Feeney (2018–2022)

Most tries in a match

- 4, Jonathon Reuben against CQ Capras at Jack Manski Oval (21 May 2017)
- 4, Rhyse Martin against CQ Capras at Jack Manski Oval (28 March 2015)

Most Goals in a Match

- 10, Shaun Nona against Souths Logan Magpies at Jack Manski Oval (9 July 2022)
- 10, Carlin Anderson against Mackay Cutters at Jack Manski Oval (18 March 2017)

Most Points in a Match

- 28, (2 tries, 10 goals), Carlin Anderson against Mackay Cutters at Jack Manski Oval (18 March 2017)

Most Tries in a Season

- 31, Zac Santo in 2015

Most Points in a Season

- 220 (20 tries, 70 goals), Carlin Anderson in 2017

== Sponsors ==
- Mendi Constructions (Major)
- Phoenix Constructions
- QDP Trenchless
- Parry NQ
- Allara Learning
- KFC
- Bartercard
- The Lancini Group
- VCV Townsville
- Power100
- Townsville Bulletin
- Brothers Leagues Club
- Kirwan Sports Club

== See also ==
- National Rugby League reserves affiliations
- North Queensland Cowboys
- North Queensland Young Guns
