= Jack Manski Oval =

Sporting venue in Townsville, Queensland

- Interactive map of Jack Manski Oval
- Location: Golf Links Drive, Kirwan, Queensland
- Coordinates: 19°19′6″S 146°42′44″E
- Owner: Brothers Leagues Club
- Operator: Brothers Leagues Club
- Capacity: 4,000
- Surface: Grass
- Field shape: Rectangular

Construction
- Opened: 13 August 1984

Tenant
- Townsville Blackhawks (2015–present)

Jack Manski Oval is a sporting venue situated in the suburb of Kirwan in Townsville, Queensland, Australia. Predominantly used as a rugby league ground, it is the home ground of the Townsville Blackhawks, who play in the Queensland Cup. The ground is also used by the Townsville Brothers junior and senior rugby league teams.

== History ==
Originally based at Queens Park and, later, Gill Park, the Townsville Brothers rugby league club purchased 20 acres of land from Kern Brothers Earthmoving in the early 1980s in Kirwan to develop a new clubhouse and playing fields in the suburb.

On 14 May 1983, the venue was officially named Jack Manski Oval, in honour of Jack Manski, a club official who worked for the club for over 40 years.

The ground was officially opened on 13 August 1984, with Brothers playing University and winning in all four grades.

On 10 September 2014, it was announced that the Townsville Blackhawks were admitted into the Queensland Cup for the 2015 seasons and would play their home games at the venue.

On 14 February 2015, the Blackhawks played their first game at the venue, a 12–24 loss to the North Queensland Cowboys in a pre-season trial. On March 7, they played their first Queensland Cup at the venue, defeating the Mackay Cutters.

In 2017, the venue was upgraded with new playing lights thanks to a state government grant. The new 227 lux lights allowed the venue to host night games.
