= Tweed Heads Seagulls =

Australian rugby league club, based in Tweed Heads, NSW

Club information
- Full name: Tweed Heads Seagulls; Rugby League Football Club Ltd.
- Nickname: The Seagulls
- Colours: Black; White
- Founded: 1909; 117 years ago
- Website: tweedheadsseagulls.com.au

Current details
- Ground: Piggabeen Sports Complex, Tweed Heads
- Coach: Aaron Zimmerle
- Competition: Queensland Cup
- 2022: 6th
- Current season
- Premierships (2nd grade): 1 (2007)
- Runners-up (2nd grade): 1 (2011)
- Wooden spoons (2nd grade): 0
- Premierships (3rd grade): 0
- Runners-up (3rd grade): 1 (2006)

Logo circa 2003

The Tweed Heads Seagulls, often referred to simply as Tweed or Seagulls or Tweed Seagulls, is a rugby league club based in Tweed Heads, New South Wales. It is one of only two club teams based outside of Queensland to play in the Queensland Cup, along with the PNG Hunters.

== History ==
=== Union beginnings ===
Seagulls Football Club was established in 1908 and began competing in the Tweed District Rugby Union competition in 1909. Land located in the west of Tweed Heads was purchased where the stadium and clubhouse were built in 1972. The Seagulls played their home games at Tweed Heads Recreation Ground. Coach Mick McGrath decided to name the team the Tweed Heads Seagulls. The club claimed their first rugby union premiership in 1912 and went back-to-back in 1913.

=== Entry into the NSWRL ===
In 1990 the Seagulls Leagues club bought out the New South Wales Rugby League licence for the Gold Coast-Tweed Giants, and renamed the club the Gold Coast Seagulls, although it continued to play its home games in the New South Wales town of Tweed Heads. The club played their home games at Seagulls Stadium. In 1990, the Seagulls pulled off a major coup when they signed future Rugby League Immortal Wally Lewis. In 1995 the club sold its licence to businessmen Jeff Muller, who changed the club's name to Gold Coast Gladiators.

=== Relegation to Gold Coast Group 18 ===
The Tweed Heads Seagulls joined the Gold Coast Group 18 Rugby League competition in 1996.

=== Queensland Cup ===
In 2007 they were Intrust Super Cup Premiers.

== Home ground ==
Tweed Heads originally played out of Seagulls Stadium on Gollan Drive, Tweed Heads West. However, due to financial trouble, the club sold the ground in the late 1990s and the stadium was demolished in replacement for a housing estate built straight after being sold. Currently, Tweed play their Queensland Cup games nearby at the Seagulls Sports Complex on Carramar Drive, Tweed Heads West.

== Tweed Heads Seagulls Leagues Club ==
North Sydney Leagues Club amalgamated with the Seagulls Club, a border club at Tweed Heads West on the far north coast of New South Wales, the oldest provincial rugby league club in Australia.

== Honours ==
- Queensland Cup
  - Premiers: – (2007)
  - Runners-Up: – (2011)
  - Minor Premierships: – (2011)

== See also ==
- National Rugby League reserves affiliations
