= 2016 Townsville Blackhawks season =

- Queensland Cup rank: 3rd
- Play-off result: Lost semi final
- 2016 record: Wins: 16; draws: 1; losses: 6
- Points scored: For: 694; against: 403

Team information
- CEO: Justin Wilkins
- Coach: Kristian Woolf
- Captain: Glenn Hall Anthony Mitchell
- Stadium: Jack Manski Oval

Top scorers
- Tries: Jonathon Reuben (20)
- Goals: Kyle Laybutt (47)
- Points: Kyle Laybutt (122)
← 2015	2017 →

The 2016 Townsville Blackhawks season was the second in the club's history. Coached by Kristian Woolf and co-captained by Glenn Hall and Anthony Mitchell, they compete in the Intrust Super Cup.

== Season summary ==
The year started off on a sour note, with club captain Daniel Beasley tearing his ACL and being ruled out for the season. In his place, Glenn Hall and Anthony Mitchell were announced as co-captains of the team. Coming off a minor premiership and Grand Final appearance in 2015, the Blackhawks got off to a strong start to their second season in the Intrust Super Cup, winning their first five games. On May 19, inaugural Blackhawk Neville Costigan retired due to a chronic knee injury.

=== Milestones ===
- Round 1: Sam Foster, Sam Hoare, Delouise Hoeter, Kyle Laybutt, Willie Minoga, David Munro and Kieran Quabba made their debuts for the club.
- Round 1: Sam Hoare scored his first try for the club.
- Round 2: Delouise Hoeter scored his first try for the club.
- Round 3: Kyle Laybutt scored his first try for the club.
- Round 4: Lona Kaifoto made his debut for the club.
- Round 5: Hezron Murgha made his debut for the club.
- Round 5: Hezron Murgha scored his first try for the club.
- Round 6: Conor Carey and Brenden Santi made his debut for the club.
- Round 12: Matthew Bowen and Andrew Niemoeller made his debut for the club.
- Round 16: Davin Crampton made his debut for the club.
- Round 19: Daniel Strickland made his debut for the club.

== 2016 squad ==
Townsville Blackhawks
First team squad			Coaching staff
Daniel Beasley (c) – PR; Matthew Bowen – FB; Conor Carey – CE, WG; Davin Crampton – PR; Sam Foster – HB; Glenn Hall – SR, PR; Delouise Hoeter – CE, WG; Corey Jensen – SR, PR; Lona Kaifoto – SR; Troy Kapea – PR	Lorenzo Ma'afu – PR, SR; Lenny Magey – WG, CE; Rhyse Martin – SR; Willie Minoga – PR; Anthony Mitchell – HK; David Munro – LK, PR; Hezron Murgha – FB, WG; Andrew Niemoeller – LK, HK; Nathan Norford – HK; Samsen O'Neill – CE, WG	Mosese Pangai – CE; Michael Parker-Walshe – HB, FE; Temone Power – SR; Kieran Quabba – LK; Jonathon Reuben – WG; Brenden Santi – LK; Daniel Strickland – SR; Noel Underwood – SR	Head coach: Kristian Woolf; Legend: (c) Captain(s); (vc) Vice-captain(s); Updated: 12 April 2016; Source(s): Blackhawks

== Squad Movement ==
=== Gains ===
Player	Signed From	Until End of	Notes
Matthew Bowen	Wigan Warriors	2016	
Conor Carey	North Queensland Cowboys	2016	
Davin Crampton	Gold Coast Titans	2016	
Sam Foster	Tweed Heads Seagulls	2016	
Glenn Hall	North Queensland Cowboys	2016	
Delouise Hoeter	Wests Tigers	2016	
Lona Kaifoto	Burdekin Roosters	2016	
Willie Minoga	PNG Hunters	2016	
David Munro	North Queensland Cowboys	2016	
Hezron Murgha	North Queensland Cowboys	2016	
Andrew Niemoeller	North Queensland Cowboys	2016	
Temone Power	North Queensland Cowboys	2016	
Kieran Quabba	North Queensland Cowboys	2016	
Brenden Santi	Wests Tigers	2016	

=== Losses ===
Player	Signed To	Until End of	Notes
Neville Costigan	Retired	-	
Jahrome Hughes	North Queensland Cowboys	2016	
Tom Humble	North Thuringowa Devils	2016	
Jack Kelleher	Townsville Brothers	2016	
Chris McLean	Retired	-	
Mitchell Seri	Herbert River Crushers	2016	
Tyler Smith	Released	-	
Ricky Thorby	Retired	-	
Dennis Tomarchio	Townsville Brothers	2016	

== Fixtures ==
=== Pre-season ===
Date	Round	Opponent	Venue	Score	Tries	Goals
Saturday, 6 February	Trial 1	Northern Pride	Jack Manski Oval	22 – 10	Niemoeller (2), Minoga, Parker-Walshe	Parker-Walshe (3)
Thursday, 11 February	Trial 2	North Queensland Cowboys	Jack Manski Oval	16 – 18	Martin, Pangai, Reuben	Laybutt (2)
Legend: Win Loss Draw

=== Regular season ===
Date	Round	Opponent	Venue	Score	Tries	Goals
Saturday, 5 March	Round 1	Redcliffe Dolphins	Jack Manski Oval	18 – 16	O'Neill (2), Hoare, Hughes	Foster (1)
Sunday, 13 March	Round 2	Ipswich Jets	North Ipswich Reserve	30 – 18	Parker-Walshe (2), Hoeter, Pangai, Reuben	Laybutt (5)
Saturday, 19 March	Round 3	Souths Logan Magpies	Jack Manski Oval	46 – 26	Reuben (2), Hall, Hoeter, Hughes, Laybutt, Martin, Mitchell, O'Neill	Laybutt (5)
Saturday, 26 March	Round 4	Wynnum Manly Seagulls	Jack Manski Oval	50 – 10	Pangai (2), Reuben (2), Hall, Hoeter, Martin, Mitchell, O'Neill, Parker-Walshe	Laybutt (5)
Sunday, 3 April	Round 5	Tweed Heads Seagulls	Piggabeen Sports Complex	42 – 8	Murgha (2), Hoeter, Hughes, Minoga, Norford, Pangai, Parker-Walshe	Jensen (3), Laybutt (2)
Sunday, 10 April	Round 6	PNG Hunters	National Football Stadium	10 – 11	Martin, Minoga	Laybutt (1)
Sunday, 17 April	Round 7	Sunshine Coast Falcons	Sunshine Coast Stadium	40 – 12	Hughes (2), Martin (2), Norford, Reuben, Underwood	Jensen (4), Laybutt (2)
Sunday, 24 April	Round 8	Northern Pride	Jack Manski Oval	26 – 13	Reuben (2), Laybutt, Norford, Santi	Laybutt (3)
Sunday, 1 May	Round 9	Burleigh Bears	Pizzey Park	28 – 28	Murgha (2), Reuben (2), Pangai	Laybutt (3), Jensen (1)
Saturday, 14 May	Round 10	CQ Capras	Jack Manski Oval	34 – 16	Murgha (2), Underwood (2), Martin, O'Neill	Laybutt (3), Jensen (2)
Saturday, 21 May	Round 11	Mackay Cutters	Jack Manski Oval	52 – 8	Reuben (3), Hughes (2), Parker-Walshe (2), Hoeter, Jensen, Quabba	Laybutt (6)
Saturday, 28 May	Round 12	Easts Tigers	Suzuki Stadium	20 – 29	Hoeter (2), Pangai, Reuben	Laybutt (2)
Sunday, 5 June	Round 13	Norths Devils	Jack Manski Oval	32 – 12	Bowen, Jensen, Ma'afu, Mitchell, Reuben, Santi	Bowen (2), Jensen (2)
Sunday, 12 June	Round 14	Redcliffe Dolphins	Dolphin Oval	16 – 18	Hughes, Kaifoto, Murgha	Bowen (2)
Saturday, 18 June	Round 15	Ipswich Jets	Jack Manski Oval	12 – 24	Hoeter, Reuben	Bowen (2)
Saturday, 25 June	Round 16	Sunshine Coast Falcons	Jack Manski Oval	22 – 12	Carey, Hoeter, Jensen, Pangai	Foster (3)
Saturday, 2 July	Round 17	Souths Logan Magpies	Davies Park	12 – 30	Martin, Santi	Jensen (2)
	Round 18	Bye				
Saturday, 16 July	Round 19	Burleigh Bears	Jack Manski Oval	20 – 26	Pangai (2), Hoeter, Ma'afu	Bowen (1), Jensen (1)
Saturday, 23 July	Round 20	CQ Capras	Alec Inch Oval	74 – 12	Martin (3), Carey (2), Pangai (2), Bowen, Crampton, Hoeter, Minoga, Parker-Walshe, Thompson	Bowen (7), Jensen (4)
Friday, 29 July	Round 21	Mackay Cutters	BB Print Stadium	16 – 14	Kaifoto, Pangai, Parker-Walshe	Bowen (2)
Sunday, 7 August	Round 22	Northern Pride	Barlow Park	22 – 20	Hoeter, Laybutt, Martin, Mitchell, Pangai	Bowen (1)
Saturday, 13 August	Round 23	PNG Hunters	Jack Manski Oval	24 – 20	Laybutt (2), Hoeter, Niemoeller	Laybutt (3), Murgha (1)
	Round 24	Bye				
Sunday, 28 August	Round 25	Norths Devils	Bishop Park	48 – 22	Hughes (2), Laybutt (2), Parker-Walshe (2), Reuben (2), Thompson	Laybutt (6)
Legend: Win Loss Draw Bye

=== Finals ===
Date	Round	Opponent	Venue	Score	Tries	Goals
Sunday, 4 September	Elimination Final	Easts Tigers	Jack Manski Oval	46 – 4	Pangai (2), Parker-Walshe (2), Reuben (2), Hoeter, Jensen, Niemoeller	Jensen (2), Martin (2), Laybutt (1)
Saturday, 10 September	Semi Final	Ipswich Jets	Jack Manski Oval	10 – 18	Hoeter, Parker-Walshe	Bowen (1)
Legend: Win Loss Draw Bye

== Statistics ==
*	Denotes player contracted to the North Queensland Cowboys for the 2016 season

Name	App	T	G	FG	Pts
Matthew Bowen	9	2	18	-	44
Conor Carey	9	3	-	-	12
Davin Crampton	8	1	-	-	4
Sam Foster	9	-	4	-	8
Glenn Hall	17	2	-	-	8
Sam Hoare*	3	1	-	-	4
Delouise Hoeter	23	15	-	-	60
Jahrome Hughes*	21	10	-	-	40
Corey Jensen	25	4	21	-	58
Lona Kaifoto	12	2	-	-	8
Kyle Laybutt*	17	7	47	-	122
Lorenzo Ma'afu	16	2	-	-	8
Lenny Magey	1	-	-	-	-
Rhyse Martin	25	11	2	-	48
Willie Minoga	21	3	-	-	12
Anthony Mitchell	24	4	-	-	16
David Munro	24	-	-	-	-
Hezron Murgha	15	7	1	-	30
Andrew Niemoeller	14	2	-	-	8
Nathan Norford	15	3	-	-	12
Samsen O'Neill	13	5	-	-	20
Mosese Pangai	19	15	-	-	60
Michael Parker-Walshe	19	13	-	-	52
Kieran Quabba	10	1	-	-	4
Jonathon Reuben	17	20	-	-	80
Brenden Santi	19	3	-	-	12
Daniel Strickland	4	-	-	-	-
Ray Thompson*	6	2	-	-	8
Noel Underwood	10	3	-	-	12
Totals		141	93	0	750

== Honours ==
=== Club ===
- Player of the Year: Jahrome Hughes
- Players' Player: Corey Jensen
- Back of the Year: Michael Parker-Walshe
- Forward of the Year: Corey Jensen

=== League ===
- Top Try Scorer: Jonathon Reuben
- Fullback of the Year: Jahrome Hughes
- Centre of the Year: Mosese Pangai
- Second Rower of the Year: Rhyse Martin
