= 2015 Townsville Blackhawks season =

- Intrust Super Cup Rank: 1st
- Play-off result: Runners up
- record: Wins: 19; draws: 1; losses: 3
- Points scored: For: 870; against: 363

Team information
- CEO: Justin Wilkins
- Coach: Kristian Woolf
- Captain: Daniel Beasley
- Stadium: Jack Manski Oval

Top scorers
- Tries: Zac Santo (31)
- Goals: Kyle Feldt (63)
- Points: Kyle Feldt (190)
2016 →

The 2015 Townsville Blackhawks season was the first in the club's history. Coached by Kristian Woolf and captained by Daniel Beasley, they competed in the Intrust Super Cup. The club won the minor premiership before losing in the grand final 20–32 to the Ipswich Jets.

== Season summary ==
The Blackhawks played their first Intrust Super Cup game against the Mackay Cutters in Townsville, winning 30-16. They received their first loss the following week, losing 24–36 to the Ipswich Jets. The club then went on an 8-game winning streak before losing to the PNG Hunters at home. The Blackhawks finished the regular season as the minor premiers, winning 19 games. They qualified for the grand final, losing to the Ipswich Jets.

=== Milestones ===
- Round 1: The club played their first Intrust Super Cup game.
- Round 1: The club recorded their first Intrust Super Cup win.
- Round 1: Jahrome Hughes scored the club's first try.
- Round 2: The club recorded their first Intrust Super Cup loss.
- Round 4: Rhyse Martin became the first Blackhawks' player to score 4 tries in a game.
- Round 9: Kyle Feldt became the first Blackhawks' player to score 3 tries in a game.
- Round 10: The club recorded their longest winning streak with their 8th straight win.
- Round 25: The club defeated Redcliffe to secure their first minor premiership.
- Finals Week 2: The club defeated the PNG Hunters to qualify for their first grand final.

== Squad List ==
=== 2015 squad ===
Townsville Blackhawks
First team squad			Coaching staff
Daniel Beasley (c) – PR, SR; Nathaniel Bowman – HB; Neville Costigan – LK, SR; Zach Daly – LK, SR; Leo Faagutu – SR, CE; Jahrome Hughes – FB, FE; Tom Humble – HB, FB; Corey Jensen – SR; Jack Kelleher – SR, LK; Lorenzo Ma'afu – PR, SR	Lenny Magey – CE, WG; Rhyse Martin – SR, CE; Rhys Matsen – WG, CE; Chris McLean – LK, SR; Anthony Mitchell – HK; Joe Mua – CE, SR; Nathan Norford – HK; Samsen O'Neill – CE, WG; Mosese Pangai – CE, WG; Michael Parker-Walshe – FE, FB	Daniel Pickering – CE; Jonathon Reuben – WG; Mitchell Seri – HB; Tyler Smith – PR; Ricky Thorby – PR; Dennis Tomarchio – SR; Wayne Ulugia – FB, WG; Noel Underwood – SR; Taylor Welch – CE; Col Wilkie – CE, SR	Head coach: Kristian Woolf; Legend: (c) Captain(s); (vc) Vice-captain(s); Updated: 16 October 2014; Source(s): Linkedin

== Fixtures ==
=== Pre-season ===
Date	Round	Opponent	Venue	Score	Tries	Goals
Saturday, 7 February	Trial 1	Northern Pride	Stan Williams Park	14 – 38	Kelleher, Seri, Smith	Seri (1)
Saturday, 14 February	Trial 2	North Queensland Cowboys	Jack Manski Oval	12 – 24	Parker-Walshe, Seri	Seri (2)
Saturday, 21 February	Trial 3	Gold Coast Titans Under 20s	Barlow Park	38 – 16	Reuben (2), Costigan, Hall, Humble, Magey, Mua, Pangai	Feldt (1), Humble (1), Seri (1)
Legend: Win Loss Draw

=== Regular season ===
Date	Round	Opponent	Venue	Score	Tries	Goals
Saturday, 7 March	Round 1	Mackay Cutters	Jack Manski Oval	30 – 16	Martin (2), Feldt, Hughes, Parker-Walshe, Santo	Feldt (2), Humble (1)
Sunday, 15 March	Round 2	Ipswich Jets	North Ipswich Reserve	24 – 36	Humble, Matsen, Pangai, Santo, Ulugia	Humble (2)
Sunday, 22 March	Round 3	Northern Pride	Barlow Park	52 – 10	Reuben (2), Santo (2), Hall, Hughes, Humble, McLean, Pangai, Thompson	Lui (5), Humble (1)
Sunday, 28 March	Round 4	Central Queensland Capras	Jack Manski Oval	50 – 12	Martin (4), Costigan, Hughes, Humble, Pangai, Santo	Lui (6), Feldt (1)
Saturday, 4 April	Round 5	Wynnum Manly Seagulls	Jack Manski Oval	28 – 16	Feldt, Humble, Parker-Walshe, Santo, Underwood	Feldt (4)
Sunday, 12 April	Round 6	Souths Logan Magpies	Davies Park	46 – 20	Reuben (2), Costigan, Hall, Hughes, Lui, Ma'afu, Martin, Parker-Walshe	Feldt (4), Lui (1)
Sunday, 19 April	Round 7	Redcliffe Dolphins	Dolphin Oval	40 – 10	Santo (2), Reuben (2), Hughes, Mitchell, Pangai, Parker-Walshe, Thompson	Lui (1), Reuben (1)
Saturday, 25 April	Round 8	Easts Tigers	Jack Manski Oval	40 – 12	Pangai (2), Feldt, Hall, Lui, Parker-Walshe, Santo	Feldt (3), Lui (3)
Saturday, 9 May	Round 9	Burleigh Bears	Jack Manski Oval	78 – 6	Feldt (3), Norford (2), Reuben (2), Santo (2), Hall, Jensen, Lui, Mitchell, Parker-Walshe	Lui (7), Feldt (4)
Saturday, 17 May	Round 10	Tweed Heads Seagulls	Piggabeen Sports Complex	28 – 0	Lui, Mitchell, Pangai, Santo, Tanginoa	Feldt (4)
Saturday, 23 May	Round 11	PNG Hunters	Jack Manski Oval	16 – 22	Feldt, Pangai, Underwood	Feldt (2)
	Round 12	Bye				
Friday, 5 June	Round 13	Mackay Cutters	Stadium Mackay	14 – 12	Parker-Walshe, Santo	Feldt (3)
Saturday, 13 June	Round 14	Central Queensland Capras	Browne Park	46 – 6	Santo (3), Parker-Walshe (2), Beasley, Feldt, Underwood	Feldt (7)
Saturday, 20 June	Round 15	Northern Pride	Jack Manski Oval	42 – 24	Santo (3), Parker-Walshe (2), Hughes, Humble, Pangai	Humble (4), Jensen (1)
Saturday, 28 June	Round 16	Sunshine Coast Falcons	Jack Manski Oval	20 – 0	The Falcons withdrew from the match. Townsville were awarded a 20–0 victory	-
Saturday, 4 July	Round 17	Burleigh Bears	Pizzey Park	46 – 12	O'Neill (2), Feldt, Humble, Kelleher, Pangai, Reuben, Santo	Feldt (7)
Saturday, 11 July	Round 18	Norths Devils	Jack Manski Oval	50 – 6	Magey (2), Norford (2), Feldt, Humble, O'Neill, Pangai, Underwood	Feldt (5), Humble (2)
Saturday, 19 July	Round 19	Easts Tigers	Tapout Energy Stadium	40 – 40	Parker-Walshe (3), Feldt, Hall, Santo, Thorby	Feldt (6)
Sunday, 26 July	Round 20	PNG Hunters	Kalabond Oval	26 – 28	Beasley, Costigan, Parker-Walshe, Santo, Tanginoa	Feldt (3)
	Round 21	Bye				
Saturday, 8 August	Round 22	Tweed Heads Seagulls	Jack Manski Oval	52 – 12	Feldt (3), Beasley, Hughes, Humble, O'Neill, Santo, Tanginoa	Feldt (6), Lui (2)
Saturday, 15 August	Round 23	Ipswich Jets	Bill Lewis Oval	36 – 28	Feldt (2), Hughes, Lui, Ma'afu, Parker-Walshe, Tanginoa	Feldt (2), Lui (2)
Saturday, 22 August	Round 24	Sunshine Coast Falcons	Sunshine Coast Stadium	20 – 13	Martin, Mitchell, Santo, Tanginoa	Lui (2)
Sunday, 30 August	Round 25	Redcliffe Dolphins	Jack Manski Oval	46 – 22	Martin (2), Santo (2), Costigan, Hall, Humble, Parker-Walshe	Lui (7)
Legend: Win Loss Draw Bye

=== Finals ===
Date	Round	Opponent	Venue	Score	Tries	Goals
Saturday, 12 September	Preliminary Final	PNG Hunters	Jack Manski Oval	26 – 12	Santo (4), Humble, Pangai	Lui (1)
Sunday, 27 September	Grand Final	Ipswich Jets	Suncorp Stadium	20 – 32	Hughes, Humble, Lui, Santo	Lui (2)
Legend: Win Loss Draw Bye

== Statistics ==
*	Denotes player contracted to the North Queensland Cowboys for the 2015 season

Name	App	T	G	FG	Pts
Daniel Beasley	23	2	-	-	8
Neville Costigan	24	4	-	-	16
Kyle Feldt*	17	16	63	-	190
Glenn Hall*	17	6	-	-	24
Jahrome Hughes	23	9	-	-	36
Tom Humble	21	11	10	-	64
Corey Jensen	16	1	1	-	6
Jack Kelleher	2	1	-	-	4
Robert Lui*	17	6	40	-	104
Lorenzo Ma'afu	23	2	-	-	8
Lenny Magey	6	2	-	-	8
Rhyse Martin	22	10	-	-	40
Rhys Matsen	5	1	-	-	4
Chris McLean	16	1	-	-	4
Anthony Mitchell	24	4	-	-	16
Nathan Norford	7	4	-	-	16
Samsen O'Neill	10	4	-	-	16
Mosese Pangai	16	11	-	-	44
Michael Parker-Walshe	21	18	-	-	72
Jonathon Reuben	9	9	-	-	36
Zac Santo*	24	31	-	-	124
Mitchell Seri	1	-	-	-	0
Kelepi Tanginoa*	19	6	-	-	24
Ray Thompson*	10	2	-	-	8
Ricky Thorby	20	1	-	-	4
Wayne Ulugia	2	1	-	-	4
Noel Underwood	13	4	-	-	16
Totals		167	114	0	896

== Honours ==
=== Club ===
- Player of the Year: Neville Costigan
- Players' Player: Jahrome Hughes
- Back of the Year: Jahrome Hughes
- Forward of the Year: Daniel Beasley

=== League ===
- Fullback of the Year: Jahrome Hughes
- Centre of the Year: Kyle Feldt
- Halfback of the Year: Michael Parker-Walshe
- Prop of the Year: Daniel Beasley
