= 2017 Townsville Blackhawks season =

- Queensland Cup Rank: 6th
- Play-off result: Lost Elimination Final
- 2017 record: Wins: 12; draws: 2; losses: 9
- Points scored: For: 573; against: 473

Team information
- CEO: Justin Wilkins
- Coach: Kristian Woolf
- Captain: Daniel Beasley
- Stadium: Jack Manski Oval

Top scorers
- Tries: Jonathon Reuben (28)
- Goals: Carlin Anderson (70)
- Points: Carlin Anderson (220)
← 2016	2018 →

The 2017 Townsville Blackhawks season was the third in the club's history. Coached by Kristian Woolf and captained by Daniel Beasley, they competed in the Intrust Super Cup and finished 6th, being eliminated in the first week of the finals.

== Season summary ==
=== Milestones ===
- Round 1: Carlin Anderson, Paul Byrnes, Ty Carucci, Shaun Fensom, Lee Jewitt, Blake Leary, Sione Lousi, Kierran Moseley, Temone Power and Oshae Tuiasau made their debuts for the club.
- Round 1: Carlin Anderson and Ty Carucci scored their first tries for the club.
- Round 2: Anthony Mitchell played his 50th game for the club.
- Round 2: Josh Hall made his debut for the club.
- Round 2: Josh Hall scored his first try for the club.
- Round 3: Ross Bella made his debut for the club.
- Round 3: Blake Leary and Kierran Moseley scored their first tries for the club.
- Round 4: Jordan Kenworthy made his debut for the club.
- Round 6: Temone Power and Jordan Kenworthy scored their first tries for the club.
- Round 7: Oshae Tuiasau scored his first try for the club.
- Round 10: Michael Parker-Walshe played his 50 game for the club.
- Round 12: The club suffered their biggest ever loss (to PNG Hunters 42–4).
- Round 13: Corey Jensen played his 50th game for the club.
- Round 14: Halvor Harris and Tremayne Bowie made their debuts for the club.
- Round 16: Jordan Drew made his debut for the club.
- Round 16: Jordan Drew scored his first try for the club.
- Round 16: Jonathon Reuben scored his 50th try for the club.
- Round 19: Francis Molo made his debut for the club.
- Round 21: Paul Byrnes scored his first try for the club.
- Round 25: Jonathon Reuben played his 50th game for the club.

== 2017 squad ==
Townsville Blackhawks
First team squad			Coaching staff
Carlin Anderson – FB; Daniel Beasley (c) – PR; Ross Bella – PR, LK; Tremayne Bowie – CE; Paul Byrnes – WG, FB; Ty Carucci – CE; Davin Crampton – CE; Jordan Drew – CE; Sam Foster – HB; Josh Hall – WG	Halvor Harris – PR; Jordan Kenworthy – LK, SR; Matt Laumea – SR, PR; Blake Leary – SR, LK; Sione Lousi – SR, PR; Cade Maloney – SR, LK; Anthony Mitchell – HK; Francis Molo – PR; Kierran Moseley – HK; David Munro – LK, PR	Andrew Niemoeller – LK, SR; Samsen O'Neill – CE, WG; Michael Parker-Walshe – HB, FE; Temone Power – SR, CE; Kieran Quabba – LK; Jonathon Reuben – WG; Oshae Tuiasau – PR; Tahanui Tutavake – SR, LK	Head coach: Kristian Woolf; Assistant coaches: Todd Wilson; Dave Elliott; Legend: (c) Captain(s); (vc) Vice-captain(s); Updated: 8 June 2017; Source(s): Blackhawks

== Squad movement ==
=== Gains ===
Player	Signed From	Until end of	Notes
Carlin Anderson	Brisbane Broncos	2017	
Ross Bella	North Queensland Cowboys	2017	
Tremayne Bowie	Townsville Brothers (mid-season)	2017	
Paul Byrnes	Brisbane Broncos	2017	
Ty Carucci	North Queensland Cowboys	2017	
Jordan Drew	Cronulla Sharks (mid-season)	2017	
Josh Hall	Penrith Panthers	2017	
Halvor Harris	Centrals ASA	2017	
Lee Jewitt	Castleford Tigers	2017	
Matt Laumea	Tully Tigers	2017	
Blake Leary	Manly Sea Eagles	2017	
Jordan Kenworthy	North Queensland Cowboys	2017	
Sione Lousi	Warriors	2017	
Cade Maloney	Townsville Brothers	2017	
Francis Molo	Norths Devils (mid-season)	2017	
Kierran Moseley	Gold Coast Titans	2017	
Oshae Tuiasau	Gold Coast Titans	2017	
Tahanui Tutavake	North Queensland Cowboys	2017	

=== Losses ===
Player	Signed To	Until end of	Notes
Matthew Bowen	Retired	-	
Conor Carey	Easts Tigers	2017	
Glenn Hall	Retired	-	
Delouise Hoeter	Norths Devils	2017	
Corey Jensen	North Queensland Cowboys	2017	
Lee Jewitt	Hull Kingston Rovers (mid-season)	2018	
Lona Kaifoto	Mackay Cutters	2017	
Lorenzo Ma'afu	Burleigh Bears	2017	
Lenny Magey	Souths Logan Magpies	2017	
Rhyse Martin	Canterbury Bulldogs	2017	
Willie Minoga	PNG Hunters	2017	
Nathan Norford	Year off	-	
Mosese Pangai	Brisbane Broncos	2017	
Brenden Santi	Sydney Roosters	2017	
Noel Underwood	Retired	-	

== Fixtures ==
=== Pre-season ===
Date	Round	Opponent	Venue	Score	Tries	Goals
Saturday, 11 February	Trial 1	Northern Pride	Barlow Park	6 – 10	-	-
Friday, 17 February	Trial 2	North Queensland Cowboys	Jack Manski Oval	8 – 44	-	-
Legend: Win Loss Draw

=== Regular season ===
Date	Round	Opponent	Venue	Score	Tries	Goals
Sunday, 5 March	Round 1	Norths Devils	Bishop Park	18 – 16	Carucci (2), Anderson, Mitchell	Jensen (1)
Sunday, 12 March	Round 2	Ipswich Jets	North Ipswich Reserve	39 – 22	Hall (2), Anderson, Beasley, Carucci, Parker-Walshe, Reuben	Anderson (5)
Saturday, 18 March	Round 3	Mackay Cutters	Jack Manski Oval	60 – 12	Anderson (2), Leary (2), Reuben (2), Jensen, Moseley, Niemoeller, O'Neill	Anderson (10)
Saturday, 25 March	Round 4	Redcliffe Dolphins	Dolphin Oval	6 – 18	Parker-Walshe	Anderson (1)
Saturday, 1 April	Round 5	Easts Tigers	Jack Manski Oval	22 – 35	Reuben (3), Carucci	Anderson (3)
Saturday, 8 April	Round 6	Northern Pride	Barlow Park	28 – 18	Kenworthy, O'Neill, Parker-Walshe, Power, Reuben	Anderson (4)
Saturday, 15 April	Round 7	Burleigh Bears	Jack Manski Oval	18 – 20	Anderson, Reuben, Tuiasau	Anderson (3)
Sunday, 23 April	Round 8	Tweed Heads Seagulls	Jack Manski Oval	48 – 18	Anderson (2), O'Neill (2), Carucci, Kenworthy, Laybutt, Power, Reuben	Anderson (6)
Saturday, 29 April	Round 9	Wynnum Manly Seagulls	Kougari Oval	22 – 16	Reuben (2), Anderson, Carucci, O'Neill	Anderson (1)
Saturday, 13 May	Round 10	Souths Logan Magpies	Jack Manski Oval	6 – 22	Reuben	Anderson (1)
Sunday, 21 May	Round 11	CQ Capras	Jack Manski Oval	26 – 26	Reuben (4), Kenworthy	Anderson (3)
Sunday, 28 May	Round 12	PNG Hunters	National Football Stadium	4 – 42	Anderson	
Sunday, 4 June	Round 13	Redcliffe Dolphins	Jack Manski Oval	26 – 16	Anderson (2), Jensen, Laybutt, Reuben	Anderson (3)
Friday, 9 June	Round 14	Mackay Cutters	BB Print Stadium	20 – 20	Bella, Reuben, Tuiasau	Anderson (4)
Saturday, 17 June	Round 15	Sunshine Coast Falcons	Jack Manski Oval	36 – 14	Anderson (2), O'Neill (2), Carucci, Power, Reuben	Anderson (4)
Sunday, 25 June	Round 16	Tweed Heads Seagulls	Piggabeen Sports Complex	50 – 8	Reuben (4), Drew (2), Anderson, Carucci, Crampton, Leary	Anderson (5)
Sunday, 2 July	Round 17	Norths Devils	Jack Manski Oval	12 – 6	Anderson (2)	Anderson (2)
	Round 18	Bye				
Saturday, 15 July	Round 19	Northern Pride	Jack Manski Oval	32 – 10	Anderson, Drew, Kenworthy, Laybutt, Moseley, Power	Anderson (4)
Saturday, 22 July	Round 20	Ipswich Jets	Eric Lenton Memorial Recreation Ground	20 – 22	Drew, Leary, Lousi, Reuben	Anderson (2)
Saturday, 29 July	Round 21	Burleigh Bears	Pizzey Park	22 – 28	Leary (2), Byrnes, Mitchell	Anderson (3)
Saturday, 5 August	Round 22	CQ Capras	Browne Park	26 – 14	Anderson (2), Beasley, Drew, Leary	Anderson (3)
Saturday, 12 August	Round 23	PNG Hunters	Jack Manski Oval	16 – 24	Anderson, Byrnes, Reuben	Anderson (2)
	Round 24	Bye				
Saturday, 26 August	Round 25	Sunshine Coast Falcons	Sunshine Coast Stadium	16 – 42	Parker-Walshe, Reuben, Tuiasau	Anderson (1), Laybutt (1)
Legend: Win Loss Draw Bye

=== Finals ===
Date	Round	Opponent	Venue	Score	Tries	Goals
Sunday, 3 September	Elimination Final	Easts Tigers	Suzuki Stadium	16 – 20	Reuben (2), Byrnes	Laybutt (2)
Legend: Win Loss Draw Bye

== Statistics ==
*	Denotes player contracted to the North Queensland Cowboys for the 2017 season

Name	App	T	G	FG	Pts
Carlin Anderson	23	20	70	-	220
Daniel Beasley	16	2	-	-	8
Ross Bella	7	1	-	-	4
Tremayne Bowie	1	-	-	-	-
Paul Byrnes	6	3	-	-	12
Ty Carucci	20	8	-	-	32
Davin Crampton	13	1	-	-	4
Jordan Drew	9	5	-	-	20
Shaun Fensom*	2	-	-	-	-
Sam Foster	10	-	-	-	-
Josh Hall	1	2	-	-	8
Halvor Harris	1	-	-	-	-
Sam Hoare*	15	-	-	-	-
Corey Jensen*	9	2	1	-	10
Lee Jewitt	4	-	-	-	-
Jordan Kenworthy	21	4	-	-	16
Kyle Laybutt*	15	3	2	-	16
Blake Leary*	21	7	1	-	30
Sione Lousi	17	1	-	-	4
Anthony Mitchell	24	2	-	-	8
Francis Molo	7	-	-	-	-
Kierran Moseley	24	2	-	-	8
David Munro	5	-	-	-	-
Andrew Niemoeller	24	1	-	-	4
Samsen O'Neill	13	7	-	-	28
Michael Parker-Walshe	21	4	-	1	17
Temone Power	17	4	-	-	16
Kierran Quabba	17	-	-	-	-
Jonathon Reuben	23	28	-	-	112
Oshae Tuiasau	22	3	-	-	12
Totals		110	74	1	589

== Honours ==
=== Club ===
- Player of the Year: Blake Leary
- Players' Player: Anthony Mitchell
- Back of the Year: Jonathon Reuben
- Forward of the Year: Blake Leary
- Under 20 Player of the Year: Brenn Foster
- Under 18 Player of the Year: Enemarki Shibasaki

=== League ===
- Top Point Scorer: Carlin Anderson
- Top Try Scorer: Jonathon Reuben
- Winger of the Year: Jonathon Reuben
- Second Rower of the Year: Blake Leary
