= 2019 Queensland Cup results =

The 2019 Queensland Cup was the 24th season of the professional rugby league competition in Queensland, Australia. It was known by the sponsorship name, Intrust Super Cup.

== Regular season ==
All times are in AEST (UTC+10:00) and AEDT (UTC+11:00) on the relevant dates.

=== Round 1 ===
| Home | Score | Away | Match information | | | |
| Home | Score | Away | Date and time | Venue | Referee | Attendance |
|---|---|---|---|---|---|---|
| Ipswich Jets | 6–34 | Townsville Blackhawks | 9 March 2019, 16:00 | North Ipswich Reserve | | |
| Easts Tigers | 24–12 | Mackay Cutters | 9 March 2019, 17:30 | Langlands Park | | |
| Sunshine Coast Falcons | 26–24 | Wynnum Manly Seagulls | 9 March 2019, 18:30 | Sunshine Coast Stadium | | |
| Northern Pride | 22–18 | Redcliffe Dolphins | 9 March 2019, 19:00 | Barlow Park | | |
| Tweed Heads Seagulls | 10–0 | Papua New Guinea Hunters | 10 March 2019, 15:00 | Piggabeen Sports Complex | | |
| South Logan Magpies | 14–36 | Central Queensland Capras | 10 March 2019, 16:00 | Davies Park | | |
| Norths Devils | 28–22 | Burleigh Bears | 10 March 2019, 16:00 | Bishop Park | | |

=== Round 2 ===
| Home | Score | Away | Match information | | | |
| Home | Score | Away | Date and time | Venue | Referee | Attendance |
|---|---|---|---|---|---|---|
| Burleigh Bears | 42–8 | Ipswich Jets | 16 March 2019, 17:00 | Pizzey Park | | |
| Redcliffe Dolphins | 6–30 | Sunshine Coast Falcons | 16 March 2019, 19:00 | Dolphin Stadium | | |
| Norths Devils | 12–30 | Easts Tigers | 16 March 2019, 19:00 | Bishop Park | | |
| Mackay Cutters | 20–22 | South Logan Magpies | 16 March 2019, 19:00 | BB Print Stadium Mackay | | |
| Central Queensland Capras | 16–36 | Wynnum Manly Seagulls | 16 March 2019, 20:00 | Browne Park | | |
| Tweed Heads Seagulls | 24–16 | Townsville Blackhawks | 17 March 2019, 13:10 | Piggabeen Sports Complex | | |
| Papua New Guinea Hunters | 0–24 | Northern Pride | 17 March 2019, 16:00 | Oil Search National Football Stadium | | |

=== Round 3 ===
| Home | Score | Away | Match information | | | |
| Home | Score | Away | Date and time | Venue | Referee | Attendance |
|---|---|---|---|---|---|---|
| Northern Pride | 4–20 | Townsville Blackhawks | 23 March 2019, 19:00 | Barlow Park | | |
| Ipswich Jets | 20–22 | Easts Tigers | 23 March 2019, 19:00 | North Ipswich Reserve | | |
| Mackay Cutters | 42–20 | Central Queensland Capras | 23 March 2019, 20:30 | BB Print Stadium Mackay | | |
| Wynnum Manly Seagulls | 18–10 | Redcliffe Dolphins | 24 March 2019, 13:10 | BMD Kougari Oval | | |
| Burleigh Bears | 32–4 | Tweed Heads Seagulls | 24 March 2019, 15:00 | Pizzey Park | | |
| South Logan Magpies | 16–42 | Norths Devils | 24 March 2019, 16:00 | Davies Park | | |
| Papua New Guinea Hunters | 26–28 | Sunshine Coast Falcons | 24 March 2019, 16:00 | Oil Search National Football Stadium | | |

=== Round 4 ===
| Home | Score | Away | Match information | | | |
| Home | Score | Away | Date and time | Venue | Referee | Attendance |
|---|---|---|---|---|---|---|
| Ipswich Jets | 26–16 | Northern Pride | 30 March 2019, 16:00 | North Ipswich Reserve | | |
| Easts Tigers | 30–14 | Papua New Guinea Hunters | 30 March 2019, 17:05 | Langlands Park | | |
| Redcliffe Dolphins | 19–18 | South Logan Magpies | 30 March 2019, 19:00 | Dolphin Stadium | | |
| Central Queensland Capras | 12–22 | Tweed Heads Seagulls | 30 March 2019, 20:00 | Browne Park | | |
| Wynnum Manly Seagulls | 22–8 | Mackay Cutters | 31 March 2019, 13:10 | BMD Kougari Oval | | |
| Sunshine Coast Falcons | 32–20 | Norths Devils | 31 March 2019, 16:30 | Sunshine Coast Stadium | | |
| Townsville Blackhawks | 16–10 | Burleigh Bears | 31 March 2019, 17:00 | Jack Manski Oval | | |

=== Round 5 ===
| Home | Score | Away | Match information | | | |
| Home | Score | Away | Date and time | Venue | Referee | Attendance |
|---|---|---|---|---|---|---|
| Townsville Blackhawks | 6–20 | Mackay Cutters | 5 April 2019 19:30 | Jack Manski Oval | | |
| Easts Tigers | 44–12 | Central Queensland Capras | 6 April 2019 16:00 | Langlands Park | | |
| Norths Devils | 28–6 | Papua New Guinea Hunters | 6 April 2019 18:00 | Bishop Park | | |
| Redcliffe Dolphins | 12–20 | Ipswich Jets | 6 April 2019 18:00 | Dolphin Stadium | | |
| Tweed Heads Seagulls | 6–32 | Wynnum Manly Seagulls | 7 April 2019 14:00 | Piggabeen Sports Complex | | |
| South Logan Magpies | 22–38 | Burleigh Bears | 7 April 2019 15:00 | Davies Park | | |
| Sunshine Coast Falcons | 50–10 | Northern Pride | 7 April 2019 15:00 | Sunshine Coast Stadium | | |

=== Round 6 ===
| Home | Score | Away | Match information | | | |
| Home | Score | Away | Date and time | Venue | Referee | Attendance |
|---|---|---|---|---|---|---|
| Sunshine Coast Falcons | 30–6 | Easts Tigers | 13 April 2019 12:45 | Sunshine Coast Stadium | | |
| Burleigh Bears | 26–18 | Wynnum Manly Seagulls | 13 April 2019 16:00 | Pizzey Park | | |
| Townsville Blackhawks | 36–6 | Redcliffe Dolphins | 13 April 2019 16:00 | Jack Manski Oval | | |
| Mackay Cutters | 12–16 | Tweed Heads Seagulls | 13 April 2019 18:00 | BB Print Stadium Mackay | | |
| Northern Pride | 12–16 | South Logan Magpies | 13 April 2019 18:00 | Barlow Park | | |
| Central Queensland Capras | 10–28 | Papua New Guinea Hunters | 13 April 2019 18:35 | Emerald, Queensland | | |
| Ipswich Jets | 14–31 | Norths Devils | 14 April 2019 13:40 | North Ipswich Reserve | | |

=== Round 7 ===
| Home | Score | Away | Match information | | | |
| Home | Score | Away | Date and time | Venue | Referee | Attendance |
|---|---|---|---|---|---|---|
| Northern Pride | 18–26 | Wynnum Manly Seagulls | 18 April 2019 18:00 | Barlow Park | | |
| Central Queensland Capras | 6–52 | Sunshine Coast Falcons | 18 April 2019 19:00 | Browne Park | | |
| Easts Tigers | 28–20 | South Logan Magpies | 18 April 2019 19:00 | Langlands Park | | |
| Mackay Cutters | 10–24 | Burleigh Bears | 18 April 2019 19:30 | BB Print Stadium Mackay | | |
| Norths Devils | 22–10 | Townsville Blackhawks | 20 April 2019 18:00 | Bishop Park | | |
| Redcliffe Dolphins | 26–6 | Tweed Heads Seagulls | 20 April 2019 18:00 | Dolphin Stadium | | |
| Papua New Guinea Hunters | 10–28 | Ipswich Jets | 20 April 2019 15:00 | Oil Search National Football Stadium | | |

=== Round 8 ===
| Home | Score | Away | Match information | | | |
| Home | Score | Away | Date and time | Venue | Referee | Attendance |
|---|---|---|---|---|---|---|
| Burleigh Bears | 56–4 | Papua New Guinea Hunters | 25 April 2019 16:00 | Pizzey Park | | |
| Easts Tigers | 16–12 | Redcliffe Dolphins | 27 April 2019 15:00 | Langlands Park | | |
| Norths Devils | 32–16 | Northern Pride | 27 April 2019 15:00 | Bishop Park | | |
| Townsville Blackhawks | 40–4 | Central Queensland Capras | 27 April 2019 16:00 | Jack Manski Oval | | |
| Sunshine Coast Falcons | 30–10 | Mackay Cutters | 27 April 2019 17:00 | Sunshine Coast Stadium | | |
| Tweed Heads Seagulls | 32–24 | Ipswich Jets | 28 April 2019 14:00 | Piggabeen Sports Complex | | |
| Wynnum Manly Seagulls | 34–22 | South Logan Magpies | TBA | TBA | | |
Source:www.postcourier.com.pg

=== Round 9 ===
| Home | Score | Away | Match information | | | |
| Home | Score | Away | Date and time | Venue | Referee | Attendance |
|---|---|---|---|---|---|---|
| Ipswich Jets | 28–18 | Central Queensland Capras | 3 May 2019 19:00 | North Ipswich Reserve | | |
| Mackay Cutters | 22–6 | Northern Pride | 4 May 2019 18:00 | BB Print Stadium Mackay | | |
| Redcliffe Dolphins | 0–48 | Burleigh Bears | 4 May 2019 18:00 | Dolphin Stadium | | |
| Tweed Heads Seagulls | 36–8 | Norths Devils | 5 May 2019 14:00 | Piggabeen Sports Complex | | |
| Wynnum Manly Seagulls | 38–22 | Easts Tigers | 5 May 2019 14:00 | BMD Kougari Oval | | |
| Papua New Guinea Hunters | 14–24 | Townsville Blackhawks | 5 May 2019 15:00 | Oil Search National Football Stadium | | |
| South Logan Magpies | 4–72 | Sunshine Coast Falcons | 5 May 2019 15:00 | Davies Park | | |
Source:www.qrl.com.au

=== Round 10 ===
| Home | Score | Away | Match information | | | |
| Home | Score | Away | Date and time | Venue | Referee | Attendance |
|---|---|---|---|---|---|---|
| Easts Tigers | 4–16 | Tweed Heads Seagulls | 18 May 2019 15:00 | Langlands Park | | |
| Northern Pride | 0–43 | Burleigh Bears | 18 May 2019 18:00 | Barlow Park | | |
| Norths Devils | 42–18 | Mackay Cutters | 18 May 2019 18:00 | Bishop Park | | |
| Central Queensland Capras | 10–52 | Redcliffe Dolphins | 19 May 2019 15:00 | Browne Park | | |
| Papua New Guinea Hunters | 6–28 | Wynnum Manly Seagulls | 19 May 2019 15:00 | Oil Search National Football Stadium | | |
| South Logan Magpies | 20–36 | Ipswich Jets | 19 May 2019 15:00 | Davies Park | | |
| Townsville Blackhawks | 10–34 | Sunshine Coast Falcons | 19 May 2019 16:00 | Jack Manski Oval | | |
Source:www.qrl.com.au

=== Round 11 ===
| Home | Score | Away | Match information | | | |
| Home | Score | Away | Date and time | Venue | Referee | Attendance |
|---|---|---|---|---|---|---|
| Ipswich Jets | 8–62 | Sunshine Coast Falcons | 25 May 2019 15:00 | North Ipswich Reserve | | |
| Burleigh Bears | 34–12 | Central Queensland Capras | 25 May 2019 16:00 | Pizzey Park | | |
| Townsville Blackhawks | 30–6 | Easts Tigers | 25 May 2019 16:00 | Jack Manski Oval | | |
| Mackay Cutters | 16–12 | Redcliffe Dolphins | 25 May 2019 18:00 | BB Print Stadium Mackay | | |
| Northern Pride | 14–30 | Tweed Heads Seagulls | 25 May 2019 18:00 | Barlow Park | | |
| Norths Devils | 24–34 | Wynnum Manly Seagulls | 26 May 2019 15:00 | Bishop Park | | |
| Papua New Guinea Hunters | 24–22 | South Logan Magpies | 26 May 2019 15:00 | Oil Search National Football Stadium | | |

=== Round 12 ===
| Home | Score | Away | Match information | | | |
| Home | Score | Away | Date and time | Venue | Referee | Attendance |
|---|---|---|---|---|---|---|
| Mackay Cutters | 20–34 | Ipswich Jets | 31 May 2019 19:30 | BB Print Stadium Mackay | | |
| Easts Tigers | 40–22 | Northern Pride | 1 June 2019 15:00 | Langlands Park | | |
| Wynnum Manly Seagulls | 28–12 | Townsville Blackhawks | 1 June 2019 17:00 | BMD Kougari Oval | | |
| Central Queensland Capras | 12–48 | Norths Devils | 1 June 2019 18:00 | Browne Park | | |
| Redcliffe Dolphins | 48–8 | Papua New Guinea Hunters | 1 June 2019 18:00 | Dolphin Stadium | | |
| Tweed Heads Seagulls | 42–8 | South Logan Magpies | 2 June 2019 14:00 | Piggabeen Sports Complex | | |
| Sunshine Coast Falcons | 32–16 | Burleigh Bears | 2 June 2019 14:30 | Sunshine Coast Stadium | | |

=== Round 13 ===
| Home | Score | Away | Match information | | | |
| Home | Score | Away | Date and time | Venue | Referee | Attendance |
|---|---|---|---|---|---|---|
| Northern Pride | 30–4 | Central Queensland Capras | 8 June 2019 18:00 | Barlow Park | | |
| Burleigh Bears | 36–4 | Easts Tigers | 9 June 2019 14:00 | Pizzey Park | | |
| Tweed Heads Seagulls | 0–36 | Sunshine Coast Falcons | 9 June 2019 14:00 | Piggabeen Sports complex | | |
| Wynnum Manly Seagulls | 32–8 | Ipswich Jets | 9 June 2019 14:00 | BMD Kougari Oval | | |
| Papua New Guinea Hunters | 26–34 | Mackay Cutters | 9 June 2019 15:00 | Oil Search National Football Stadium | | |
| South Logan Magpies | 14–28 | Townsville Blackhawks | 9 June 2019 15:00 | Davies Park | | |
| Norths Devils | 28–16 | Redcliffe Dolphins | 9 June 2019 16:00 | Bishop Park | | |

=== Round 14 ===
| Home | Score | Away | Match information | | | |
| Home | Score | Away | Date and time | Venue | Referee | Attendance |
|---|---|---|---|---|---|---|
| Wynnum Manly Seagulls | 20–30 | Sunshine Coast Falcons | 15 June 2019 17:00 | BMD Kougari Oval | | |
| Mackay Cutters | 10–22 | Easts Tigers | 15 June 2019 18:00 | BB Print Stadium Mackay | | |
| Redcliffe Dolphins | 20–12 | Northern Pride | 15 June 2019 18:00 | Dolphin Stadium | | |
| Townsville Blackhawks | 14–6 | Ipswich Jets | 15 June 2019 19:00 | Jack Manski Oval | | |
| Central Queensland Capras | 24–24 | South Logan Magpies | TBA | TBA | | |
| Burleigh Bears | 26–12 | Norths Devils | 16 June 2019 14:00 | Pizzey Park | | |
| Papua New Guinea Hunters | 20–16 | Tweed Heads Seagulls | 16 June 2019 15:00 | Oil Search National Football Stadium | | |
Source:www.postcourier.com.pg/sports

=== Round 15 ===
| Home | Score | Away | Match information | | | |
| Home | Score | Away | Date and time | Venue | Referee | Attendance |
|---|---|---|---|---|---|---|
| Ipswich Jets | – | Burleigh Bears | 29 June 2019 15:00 | North Ipswich Reserve | | |
| Easts Tigers | – | Norths Devils | 29 June 2019 15:00 | Langlands Park | | |
| Townsville Blackhawks | – | Tweed Heads Seagulls | 29 June 2019 16:00 | Jack Manski Oval | | |
| Sunshine Coast Falcons | – | Redcliffe Dolphins | 29 June 2019 17:00 | Sunshine Coast Stadium | | |
| Wynnum Manly Seagulls | – | Central Queensland Capras | 29 June 2019 17:00 | BMD Kougari Oval | | |
| Northern Pride | 34–14 | Papua New Guinea Hunters | 30 June 2019 13:10 | Barlow Park | | |
| South Logan Magpies | – | Mackay Cutters | 30 June 2019 15:00 | Davies Park | | |

=== Round 16 ===
| Home | Score | Away | Match information | | | |
| Home | Score | Away | Date and time | Venue | Referee | Attendance |
|---|---|---|---|---|---|---|
| Mackay Cutters | – | Townsville Blackhawks | 5 July 2019 19:30 | BB Print Stadium Mackay | | |
| Ipswich Jets | – | Redcliffe Dolphins | 6 July 2019 15:00 | North Ipswich Reserve | | |
| Northern Pride | – | Sunshine Coast Falcons | 6 July 2019 15:00 | Barlow Park | | |
| Central Queensland Capras | – | Easts Tigers | 6 July 2019 18:00 | Browne Park | | |
| Burleigh Bears | – | South Logan Magpies | 7 July 2019 14:00 | Pizzey Park | | |
| Wynnum Manly Seagulls | – | Tweed Heads Seagulls | 7 July 2019 14:00 | BMD Kougari Oval | | |
| Papua New Guinea Hunters | – | Norths Devils | 7 July 2019 15:00 | Oil Search National Football Stadium | | |

=== Round 17 ===
| Home | Score | Away | Match information | | | |
| Home | Score | Away | Date and time | Venue | Referee | Attendance |
|---|---|---|---|---|---|---|
| Townsville Blackhawks | – | Northern Pride | 13 July 2019 16:00 | Jack Manski Oval | | |
| Redcliffe Dolphins | – | Wynnum Manly Seagulls | 13 July 2019 18:00 | Dolphin Stadium | | |
| Central Queensland Capras | – | Mackay Cutters | TBA | TBA | | |
| Tweed Heads Seagulls | – | Burleigh Bears | 14 July 2019 14:00 | Piggabeen Sports Complex | | |
| Sunshine Coast Falcons | – | Papua New Guinea Hunters | 14 July 2019 14:30 | Sunshine Coast Stadium | | |
| Easts Tigers | – | Ipswich Jets | 14 July 2019 15:00 | Langlands Park | | |
| Norths Devils | – | South Logan Magpies | 14 July 2019 15:00 | Bishop Park | | |

=== Round 18 ===
| Home | Score | Away | Match information | | | |
| Home | Score | Away | Date and time | Venue | Referee | Attendance |
|---|---|---|---|---|---|---|
| Redcliffe Dolphins | – | South Logan Magpies | TBA | TBA | | |
| Papua New Guinea Hunters | – | Easts Tigers | TBA | TBA | | |
| Townsville Blackhawks | – | Burleigh Bears | TBA | TBA | | |
| Wynnum Manly Seagulls | – | Mackay Cutters | TBA | TBA | | |
| Sunshine Coast Falcons | – | Norths Devils | TBA | TBA | | |
| Northern Pride | – | Ipswich Jets | TBA | TBA | | |
| Tweed Heads Seagulls | – | Central Queensland Capras | TBA | TBA | | |

=== Round 19 ===
| Home | Score | Away | Match information | | | |
| Home | Score | Away | Date and time | Venue | Referee | Attendance |
|---|---|---|---|---|---|---|
| Norths Devils | – | Ipswich Jets | 27 July 2019 19:30 | Bishop Park | | |
| Tweed Heads Seagulls | – | Mackay Cutters | 28 July 2019 14:00 | Piggabeen Sports Complex | | |
| South Logan Magpies | – | Northern Pride | 28 July 2019 15:00 | Davies Park | | |
| Easts Tigers | – | Wynnum Manly Seagulls | 3 August 2019 15:00 | Langlands Park | | |
| Burleigh Bears | – | Redcliffe Dolphins | 3 August 2019 16:00 | Pizzey Park | | |
| Townsville Blackhawks | – | Papua New Guinea Hunters | 3 August 2019 16:00 | Jack Manski Oval | | |
| Sunshine Coast Falcons | – | Central Queensland Capras | 3 August 2019 17:00 | Sunshine Coast Stadium | | |

=== Round 20 ===
| Home | Score | Away | Match information | | | |
| Home | Score | Away | Date and time | Venue | Referee | Attendance |
|---|---|---|---|---|---|---|
| Ipswich Jets | – | Tweed Heads Seagulls | 10 August 2019 15:00 | North Ipswich Reserve | | |
| Central Queensland Capras | – | Townsville Blackhawks | 10 August 2019 18:00 | Browne Park | | |
| Mackay Cutters | – | Sunshine Coast Falcons | 10 August 2019 18:00 | BB Print Stadium Mackay | | |
| Northern Pride | – | Norths Devils | 10 August 2019 18:00 | Barlow Park | | |
| Redcliffe Dolphins | – | Easts Tigers | 10 August 2019 18:00 | Dolphin Stadium | | |
| Papua New Guinea Hunters | – | Burleigh Bears | 11 August 2019 15:00 | Oil Search National Football Stadium | | |
| South Logan Magpies | – | Wynnum Manly Seagulls | 11 August 2019 15:00 | Davies Park | | |

=== Round 21 ===
| Home | Score | Away | Match information | | | |
| Home | Score | Away | Date and time | Venue | Referee | Attendance |
|---|---|---|---|---|---|---|
| Ipswich Jets | – | South Logan Magpies | 17 August 2019 15:00 | North Ipswich Reserve | | |
| Burleigh Bears | – | Northern Pride | 17 August 2019 16:00 | Pizzey Park | | |
| Sunshine Coast Falcons | – | Townsville Blackhawks | 17 August 2019 17:00 | Sunshine Coast Stadium | | |
| Mackay Cutters | – | Norths Devils | 17 August 2019 18:00 | BB Print Stadium Mackay | | |
| Redcliffe Dolphins | – | Central Queensland Capras | 17 August 2019 18:00 | Dolphin Stadium | | |
| Tweed Heads Seagulls | – | Easts Tigers | 18 August 2019 14:00 | Piggabeen Sports Complex | | |
| Wynnum Manly Seagulls | – | Papua New Guinea Hunters | 18 August 2019 14:00 | BMD Kougari Oval | | |

=== Round 22 ===
| Home | Score | Away | Match information | | | |
| Home | Score | Away | Date and time | Venue | Referee | Attendance |
|---|---|---|---|---|---|---|
| Ipswich Jets | – | Mackay Cutters | 24 August 2019 15:00 | North Ipswich Reserve | | |
| Townsville Blackhawks | – | Wynnum Manly Seagulls | 24 August 2019 16:00 | Jack Manski Oval | | |
| Norths Devils | – | Central Queensland Capras | 24 August 2019 17:00 | Bishop Park | | |
| Northern Pride | – | Easts Tigers | 24 August 2019 18:00 | Barlow Park | | |
| Burleigh Bears | – | Sunshine Coast Falcons | 25 August 2019 14:00 | Pizzey Park | | |
| Papua New Guinea Hunters | – | Redcliffe Dolphins | 25 August 2019 15:00 | Oil Search National Football Stadium | | |
| South Logan Magpies | – | Tweed Heads Seagulls | 25 August 2019 15:00 | Davies Park | | |

=== Round 23 ===
| Home | Score | Away | Match information | | | |
| Home | Score | Away | Date and time | Venue | Referee | Attendance |
|---|---|---|---|---|---|---|
| Easts Tigers | – | Townsville Blackhawks | 31 August 2019 15:00 | Langlands Park | | |
| Central Queensland Capras | – | Burleigh Bears | 31 August 2019 18:00 | Browne Park | | |
| Redcliffe Dolphins | – | Mackay Cutters | 31 August 2019 18:00 | Dolphin Stadium | | |
| Tweed Heads Seagulls | – | Northern Pride | 1 September 2019 14:00 | Piggabeen Sports Complex | | |
| Wynnum Manly Seagulls | – | Norths Devils | 1 September 2019 14:00 | BMD Kougari Oval | | |
| Sunshine Coast Falcons | – | Ipswich Jets | 1 September 2019 14:30 | Sunshine Coast Stadium | | |
| South Logan Magpies | – | Papua New Guinea Hunters | 1 September 2019 15:00 | Davies Park | | |
