= Tevita Pangai Junior =

Tonga international rugby league footballer

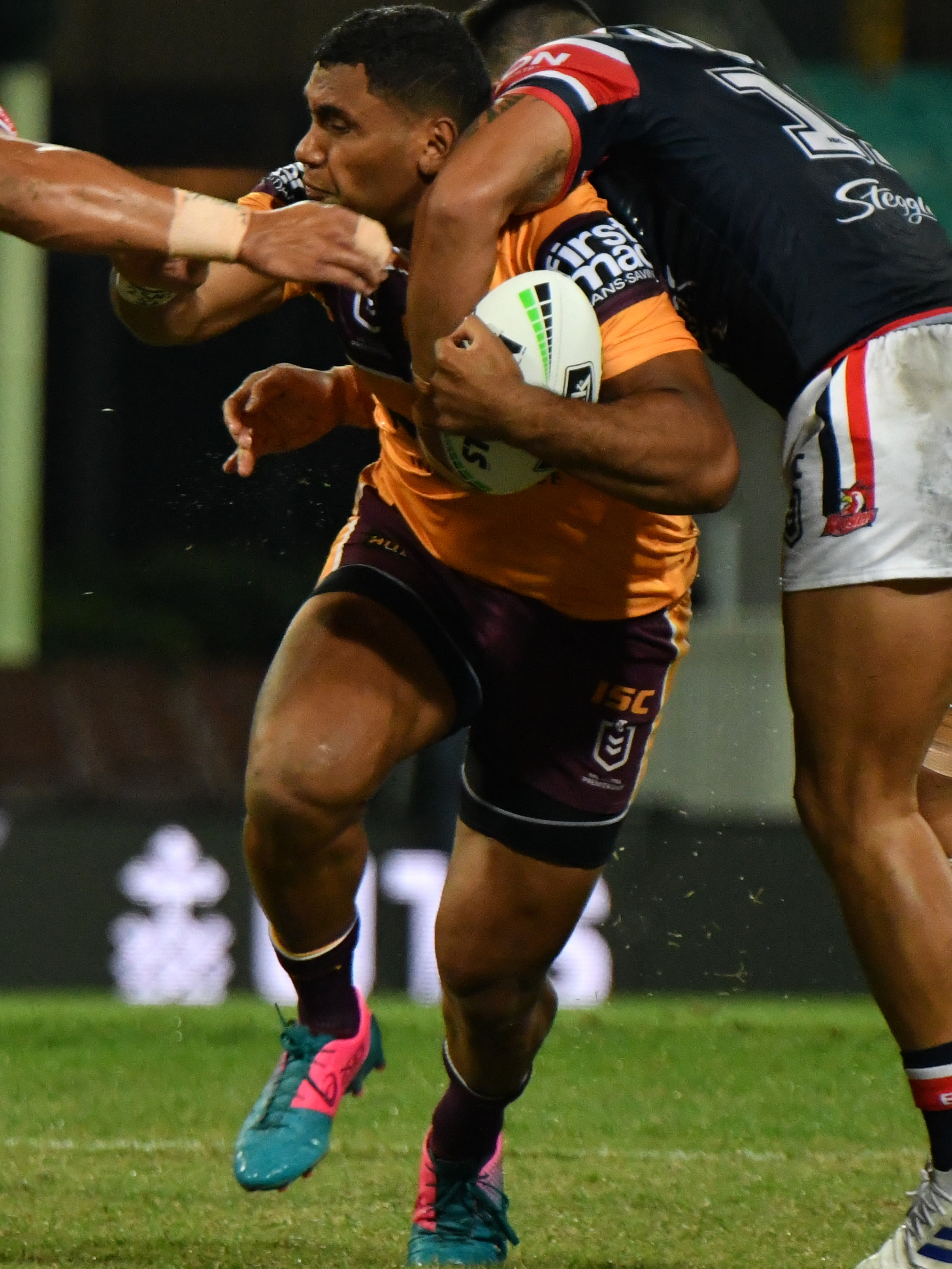

Personal information
- Born: 4 February 1996 (age 30) Ashfield, New South Wales, Australia
- Height: 191 cm (6 ft 3 in)
- Weight: 117 kg (18 st 6 lb)

Playing information

Rugby league
- Position: Prop, Second-row, Lock
Club
Years	Team	Pld	T	G	FG	P
2016–21	Brisbane Broncos	96	14	0	0	56
2021	Penrith Panthers	6	2	0	0	8
2022–23	Canterbury Bulldogs	36	2	0	0	8
2024	Dolphins	9	2	0	0	8
2025	Catalans Dragons	23	4	0	0	16
2026	Hull Kingston Rovers	5	1	0	0	4
2027–	Leigh Leopards	0	0	0	0	0
	Total	175	25	0	0	100
Representative
Years	Team	Pld	T	G	FG	P
2017–19	Tonga	6	3	0	0	12
2023	New South Wales	1	0	0	0	0

Rugby union
Club
Years	Team	Pld	T	G	FG	P
2025–26	SC Leucate	10	7	0	0	35
- Source: As of 20 November 2026
- Boxing career
- Nationality: Australia
- Weight: Heavyweight
- Relatives: David Pangai (brother); Mosese Pangai (brother)
- Stance: Orthodox

Boxing record
- Total fights: 5
- Wins: 4
- Win by KO: 3
- Losses: 1

Tevita Pangai Junior (born 4 February 1996) is a Tonga international rugby league footballer who plays as a prop for Leigh Leopards in the Super League.

He has previously played as a prop for the Brisbane Broncos, Penrith Panthers, Canterbury-Bankstown Bulldogs, and the Dolphins in the NRL, for Tonga at international level, New South Wales at representative level, and the Catalan Dragons and Hull KR in Super League. He is a former professional boxer.

== Background ==
Pangai was born in Ashfield, New South Wales, is of, Tongan descent, and moved to Newcastle, New South Wales at a young age.

He played his junior rugby league for the South Newcastle Lions in the Newcastle Rugby League, before being signed by the Newcastle Knights.

Pangai is the younger brother of former North Queensland Cowboys player Mosese Pangai.

== Playing career ==
=== Early career ===
After playing in the lower grades at the Newcastle Knights, Pangai Junior joined the Canberra Raiders in 2013 and played for their NYC team from 2013 to 2015. On 7 November 2013, he re-signed with Canberra on a three-year contract.

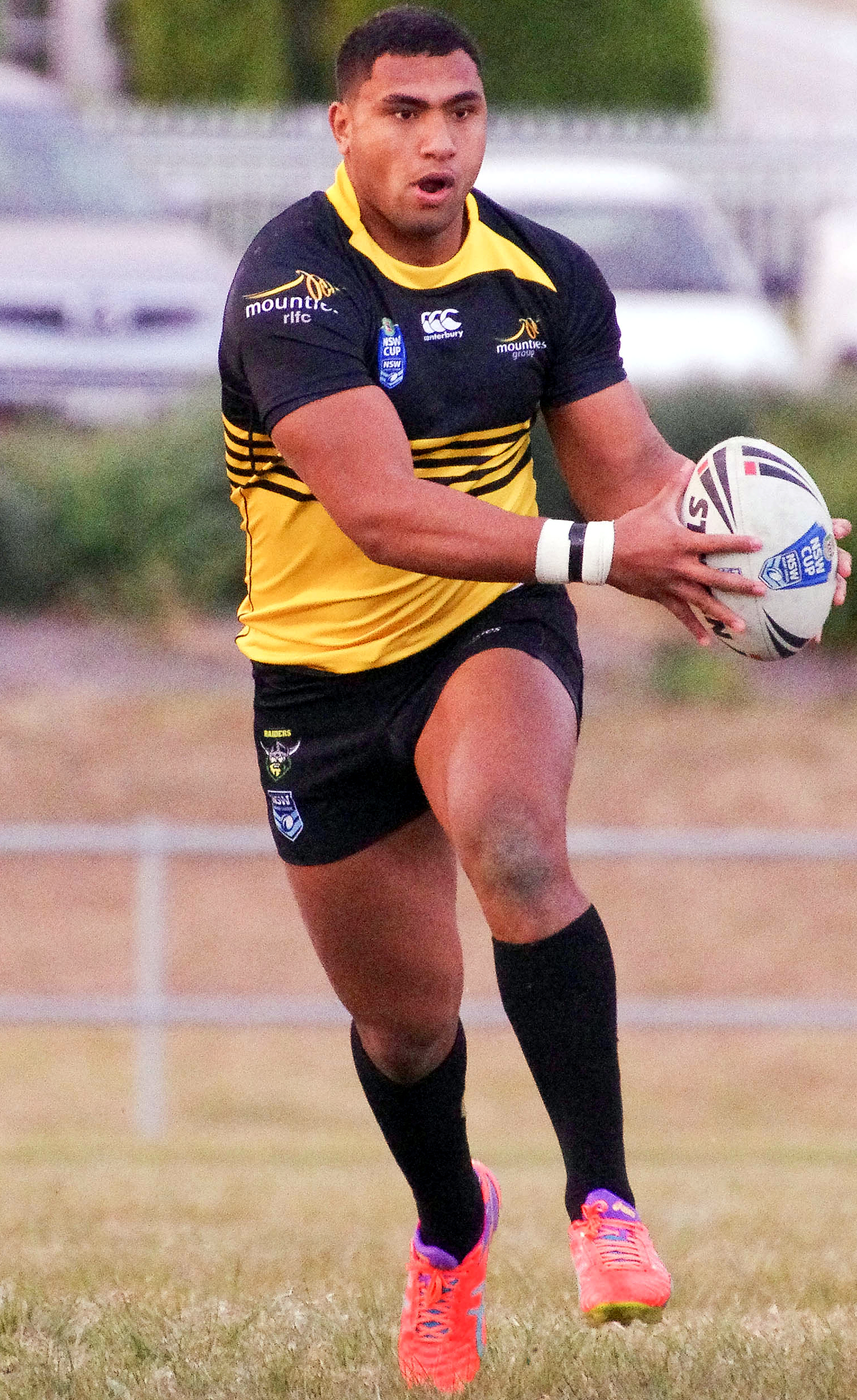
Pangai Junior playing for the Mounties

On 18 October 2014, he played for the Junior Kangaroos against the Junior Kiwis, playing at second-row in the Kangaroos' 14–15 loss at Mt Smart Stadium. He was again selected for the Junior Kangaroos in May 2015, playing off the interchange bench in the Kangaroos' 22-20 win at Robina Stadium. On 12 September 2015, he was named in Tonga's 58-man train-on squad for the World Cup qualifier against the Cook Islands. Two days later, he was named at second-row in the 2015 NYC Team of the Year.

=== 2016 ===
In January, Pangai Junior signed a two-year contract with the Brisbane Broncos starting in 2017, however, in February, he was granted a release from the final year of his Canberra contract to join Brisbane effective immediately on a revised contract for just the 2016 NRL season. On 7 May, he played for the Junior Kangaroos against the Junior Kiwis for a third year in a row, starting at prop and captaining the side in the Kangaroos' 34-20 win at Parramatta Stadium. In Round 12 of the 2016 NRL season, he made his NRL debut for the Brisbane against the Wests Tigers, playing off the interchange bench in Brisbane's 19-18 loss at Suncorp Stadium. In his next match in Round 13 against the New Zealand Warriors, he scored his first NRL career try in Brisbane's 36-18 loss at Mt Smart Stadium. He finished his debut year in the NRL having played in 14 matches and scoring 2 tries for the Broncos in the 2016 NRL season. On 22 September, he re-signed with Brisbane on a two-year contract until the end of 2018.

=== 2017 ===
After the Broncos' local derby clash against the Gold Coast in Round 7 which they won with a 24-22 win at Suncorp Stadium, Pangai Junior suffered a finger injury during the match and was sidelined for a number of weeks. Pangai Junior would return from injury in Round 13 against the Sydney Roosters in the 18-16 loss at Sydney Football Stadium. Pangai Junior finished the 2017 NRL season with him playing in 18 matches for the Broncos. On 5 October 2017, Pangai Junior was selected in the 24-man squad for Tonga for the 2017 Rugby League World Cup. On 11 November 2017, Pangai Junior made his international debut for Tonga against New Zealand, coming off the interchange bench in the inspirational 28-22 shock win at Waikato Stadium. Pangai Junior would play in the next match for Tonga against Lebanon in their 24-22 win at AMI Stadium in Christchurch. In Tonga’s Semi Final match against England, Pangai Junior scored his first international try, the start of an unlikely Tonga comeback from 20-0 down with 9 minutes to fulltime. As Tonga would dare to dream and score another two more 2 tries to make the score 20-18 with 2 minutes to fulltime, England winger Jermaine McGillvary lost the ball in his own half of the field, Tonga had one more final chance to pinch a stunning victory but unfortunately would end up in tears after Andrew Fifita would go over the tryline on the fulltime siren but the try wasn’t checked by the video referee when the ball was raked out of his hand by England second-rower Elliot Whitehead but was seen by referee Matt Cecchin as a knock on, the match ending in a thrilling fashion 20-18 at Mt Smart Stadium. Pangai Junior finished the exciting tournament with him playing in 3 matches and scoring 1 try.

=== 2018 ===
After showing a good performance in Round 1 against the St. George Illawarra Dragons as Brisbane lost 34–12 at Kogarah Oval. In Round 2 in the Queensland derby match against the North Queensland Cowboys, Pangai Junior had a monster performance, scoring a try out of sheer strength, nearly scoring a second identical try but was disallowed and making a very crucial try saving tackle on North Queensland forward Scott Bolton as he ran to score under the posts from a inside ball from Johnathan Thurston but was slammed into the goalpost by him in the 78th minute and the Broncos came on top as 24–20 winners at Suncorp Stadium. As Pangai Junior showed himself as the standout forward for Brisbane, he was under consideration for the New South Wales State of Origin squad, but he opted to stay loyal to Tonga to represent his family but later did not take part in the Pacific international against Samoa due to injury. After missing a couple of matches due to injury in Round 19 against the Penrith Panthers, Pangai Junior had a sensational first half, scoring two tries as Brisbane went on to win convincingly 50-18 at Suncorp Stadium. Pangai Junior would finish his best season to date, playing in 22 matches and scoring five tries for Brisbane. On 20 October, he played in the historical first-ever Test match between Tonga and the Australian Kangaroos, scoring a try in the 34-16 loss at Mt Smart Stadium, playing in front of a sold-out crowd at Mount Smart Stadium, Auckland. In late November, Pangai Junior announced that he wanted to represent New South Wales for the 2019 series, after being named in Brad Fittler’s 32-man training squad. On 6 December 2018, Pangai Junior re-signed with the Broncos on a 1-year contract for the 2019 season, despite being offered lucrative contracts from other clubs.

=== 2019 ===
Pangai Junior made 18 appearances for Brisbane as the club finished in eighth place and qualified for the finals. He missed out on playing in Brisbane's 58-0 elimination final loss against Parramatta at the Western Sydney Stadium.

=== 2020 ===
On 12 August, Pangai Junior was stood down indefinitely by the NRL and fined $30,000 for "multiple breaches" of the league's COVID-19 regulations.

Statement issued by The Broncos Leagues Club 31 August 2020 in part states: The Board has made a decision to terminate Mr Pangai Junior's employment immediately but any implementation of that decision has been suspended for a period of 12 months subject to Mr Pangai Junior complying with his employment agreement and complying with the following terms:

- He was stood down immediately without pay for the remainder of the 2020 season and as a consequence will be removed from the Project Apollo “bubble”
- He immediately began a mentoring program with a club-approved mentor for a period of 12 months, with the mentor reporting back to the Board on a monthly basis
- He worked in a job organised by that mentor for the remainder of the 2020 season
- He ceased to participate in social media, as well as ceasing to engage with media unless authorised by the Club
- He returns to full duties for the 2021 pre-season in mid-November this year in good physical condition
- If Mr Pangai Junior breaches any part of his employment agreement or these terms during the 12-month period during which the termination is suspended, then the Club can immediately implement its decision to terminate his employment
- If at the end of that 12 month period Mr Pangai Junior has complied with all the above requirements then the Board will rescind its decision to terminate his employment

Pangai Junior was limited to only nine games in the 2020 NRL season as Brisbane finished last on the table and claimed the wooden spoon for the first time in their history.

=== 2021 ===
Following Brisbane's 46-0 loss against South Sydney in round 15 of the competition, he was informed by Brisbane management that his services would not be required for the following season and he had permission to negotiate with other clubs.

On 21 July, Pangai Junior signed a three-month deal with Penrith after being released immediately by the Brisbane club for the rest of the 2021 NRL season. On the same day, Pangai Junior signed a three-year deal to join Canterbury-Bankstown ahead of the 2022 season. Pangai Junior made his club debut for Penrith against South Sydney in round 23, coming off the interchange bench in a 25-12 victory.

Pangai Junior scored his first try for Penrith in round 24 of the competition in a 30-16 victory over the Wests Tigers. Pangai Junior made a total of six appearances for Penrith in the 2021 NRL season, he played in the clubs preliminary final victory over Melbourne however he was not picked for the 2021 NRL Grand Final team which defeated South Sydney.

=== 2022 ===
In round 2 of the 2022 NRL season, Pangai Junior made his debut for Canterbury in their 16-10 loss against Brisbane at Stadium Australia. Pangai Junior played 19 games for Canterbury throughout the year as the club finished 12th on the table and missed the finals.

=== 2023 ===
On 22 May, Pangai Junior was a surprise selection by New South Wales for game one of the 2023 State of Origin series.

On 15 August, it was announced that Pangai Junior would retire from rugby league to pursue a professional boxing career.

=== 2024 ===
Pangai Junior signed with the Souths Logan Magpies in the Queensland Cup. On 7 June 2024, it was announced that Pangai Junior signed with the Dolphins in the NRL until the end of 2024.

On 7 August 2024, it was reported that he had signed for Catalans Dragons in the Super League on a one-year deal.

=== 2025 ===
On 18 July 2025 it was reported that he had signed for Warrington Wolves in the Super League on a 1-year deal. However, on 30 October 2025, it was announced he had informed the Wolves that he would not be joining for the 2026 season.

On 14 November 2025 it was reported that he had signed for 6th Division French rugby union side SC Leucate

=== 2026 ===
Pangai Junior returned again to the Super League on 17 May 2026 with the announcement he had signed for Hull KR until the end of the 2026 season. After debuting as an interchange in Rovers' Round 14 win against the York Knights on 12 June, Pangai Junior received a six-match ban for eye-gouging Leeds Rhinos player Jake Connor in Rovers' 8-34 loss to the Rhinos on 26 June.

In the second match after his return on 18 August, a rescheduled Round 2 match against Warrington Wolves that saw him score his only try for Hull KR, Pangai Junior was again suspended for four matches for three late tackles against Warrington players; due to the ban not taking effect immediately due to the rescheduling, Pangai Junior was dropped from the Hull KR squad for the next match by coach Willie Peters. On appeal, this ban was extended to five matches, leaving Pangai Junior only eligible to play again for Hull KR if they reached the Grand Final.

Hull KR announced Pangai Junior's release at the end of his contract on 14 September, and, as Hull KR were knocked out of the play-offs, he did not play again for the club. On 26 September, it was announced that Pangai Junior had signed to play for the Leigh Leopards from 2027 onwards in a 'multi-year' contract.

== NRL / Super League statistics ==
Year	Team	Games	Tries	Pts
2016	Brisbane Broncos	14	2	8
2017	Brisbane Broncos	18		
2018	Brisbane Broncos	22	5	20
2019	Brisbane Broncos	18	2	8
2020	Brisbane Broncos	9	2	8
2021	Brisbane Broncos	15	3	12
2021	Penrith Panthers	6	2	8
2022	Canterbury-Bankstown Bulldogs	19	1	4
2023	Canterbury-Bankstown Bulldogs	17	1	4
2024	Dolphins	9	2	8
2025	Catalans Dragons	23	4	16
2026	Hull KR	5	1	4
2027	Leigh Leopards	0	0	0
	Totals	175	25	110

== Boxing ==
=== Professional boxing record ===
5 fights	4 wins	1 loss
By knockout	3	1
By decision	1	0

No.	Result	Record	Opponent	Type	Round, time	Date	Location	Notes
5	Loss	4–1	Kenny Niko	TKO	1 (6), 1:09	11 May 2024	Greek Club, Brisbane, Australia	
4	Win	4–0	Raphael Sa'u	TKO	3 (6)	23 March 2024	Ipswich Basketball Stadium, Ipswich, Australia	
3	Win	3–0	Frank Amato	MD	6	7 October 2023	Townsville Entertainment and Convention Centre, Townsville, Australia	
2	Win	2–0	Jerry Tupai	KO	2 (4), 3:00	5 November 2022	Aware Super Theatre, Sydney, Australia	
1	Win	1–0	Gerico Cecil	TKO	2 (4), 1:04	4 December 2021	Fortitude Music Hall, Brisbane, Australia	
