= Josh Hall (footballer) =

Australian rules football & rugby league player

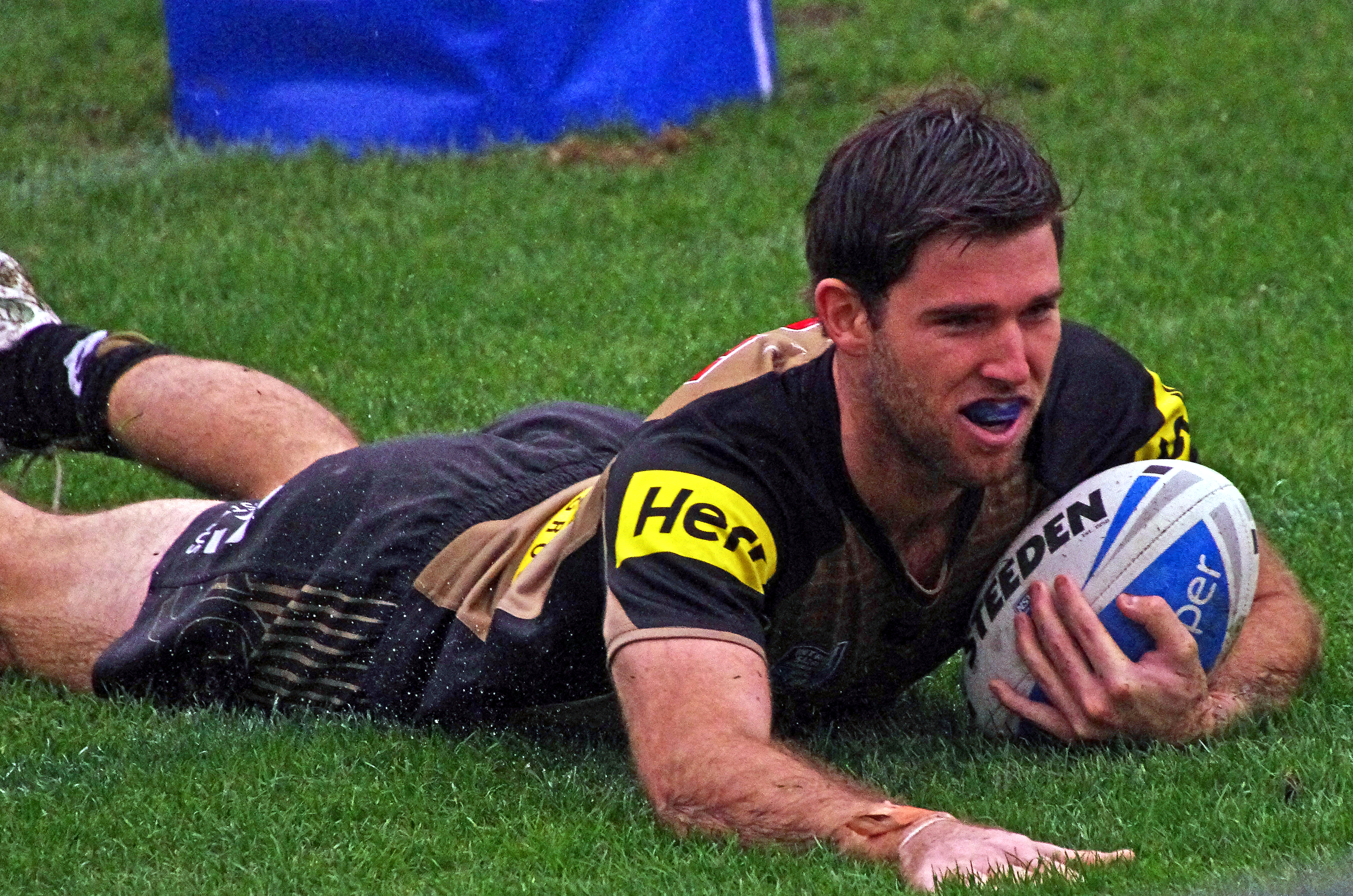

Personal information
- Full name: Joshua Hall
- Born: 3 April 1990 (age 36) Townsville, Queensland, Australia
- Height: 197 cm (6 ft 6 in)
- Weight: 92 kg (14 st 7 lb)

Playing information
- Position: Wing
Club
Years	Team	Pld	T	G	FG	P
2016	Penrith Panthers	0	0	0	0	0

Australian rules football
- Position: Ruckman, Backman
Club
Years	Team	Pld	G
2012–15	Gold Coast	7	3
- Source: As of 2015
Medals
Men's athletics
Representing Australia
World Youth Championships
Bronze medal – third place	2007 Ostrava	High jump

Josh Hall (born 3 April 1990) is former dual-code professional (Gold Coast Suns Australian rules football and Penrith Panthers National Rugby League) from Townsville in Queensland.

== Early life ==
Hall was born and raised in Townsville, Queensland. He played junior rugby league in his younger years, playing the positions of fullback and centre. He supported the North Queensland Cowboys in the National Rugby League throughout his schooling years at William Ross State High School. As a teenager, Hall decided to focus on High jump with the dream of one day representing Australia at the Olympics.

== High jump career ==
Hall won the bronze medal at the 2007 World Youth Championships in Athletics. He jumped a personal best of 2.26m nine times in 2010 which cleared the B qualifying height for the 2010 Commonwealth Games. However, he was overlooked for the 2010 Australian Commonwealth Games team and decided to take a break from high jump. Later in 2010 he attended training at the Townsville City Lions AFC as a part of practical work in his sports science degree at James Cook University. Despite only being required to run water initially, the trip would result in Hall playing Australian rules football for the first time at 20 years of age. The following year saw Hall sign up to play senior football for the Curra Swans in the AFL Townsville competition.

After just four games of senior football for Curra, Hall attracted the attention of a Gold Coast Suns Academy scout. Although not officially a part of the team, Hall was invited to play football for the Gold Coast Suns reserves team in 2011 and showed much promise as a ruckman. He also fell 2 centimeters shy of qualifying for the High Jump in the 2012 London Olympics.

== AFL career ==
Hall was drafted with the 94th pick in the 2012 AFL rookie draft by the Gold Coast Suns. After weeks of solid form in the NEAFL, he was selected to play for the Suns senior team for their clash with the Richmond Tigers in Cairns. In his AFL debut he kicked two goals in a two-point victory over Richmond. Hall managed seven senior AFL games over his four-year AFL career before being delisted on 8 September 2015. In a radio interview conducted on 14 September 2015, Hall stated he wanted a contract extension with the Gold Coast and only explored his options after he was made aware that he would not be re-signed.

=== Statistics ===
Legend
G	Goals	K	Kicks	D	Disposals	T	Tackles
B	Behinds	H	Handballs	M	Marks

Season	Team	No.	Games	Totals							Averages (per game)						
Season	Team	No.	Games	G	B	K	H	D	M	T	G	B	K	H	D	M	T
2012	Gold Coast	46	2	2	1	5	3	8	4	0	1.00	0.50	2.50	1.50	4.00	2.00	0.00
2013	Gold Coast	46	3	1	1	14	11	25	10	5	0.33	0.33	4.67	3.67	8.33	3.33	1.67
2014	Gold Coast	46	0	0	0	0	0	0	0	0	0.00	0.00	0.00	0.00	0.00	0.00	0.00
2015	Gold Coast	46	2	0	0	6	3	9	1	10	0.00	0.00	3.00	1.50	4.50	0.50	5.00
AFL Career			7	3	2	25	17	42	15	15	0.43	0.29	3.57	2.43	6.00	2.14	2.14

== NRL career ==
In May 2015, it was revealed that Hall met with Gold Coast Titans coach Neil Henry at Gold Coast Airport to discuss a potential switch of codes but was informed he would need to prove himself in the Queensland Cup before an NRL contract would be offered. Hall flew to Sydney in August 2015 to meet with Penrith Panthers General Manager Phil Gould where the two discussed switching codes. On 8 September 2015, Hall was signed by the Penrith Panthers on a two-year deal. Josh played for Penrith's Intrust Super Premiership Team, which is one step below the NRL squad. He was released at the end of Season 2016.

In 2017, Hall signed with the Townsville Blackhawks upon returning to his hometown.

== Return to Australian Rules ==
Hall signed with the QAFL's Southport Sharks in 2018.

=== Statistics ===
Season	Team	Games	Tries	Goals	F/G	Points
2016	Penrith Panthers (NSW Cup)	20	11	54	–	152
Total		20	11	54	–	152
