= Ray Thompson (rugby league) =

PNG international rugby league footballer

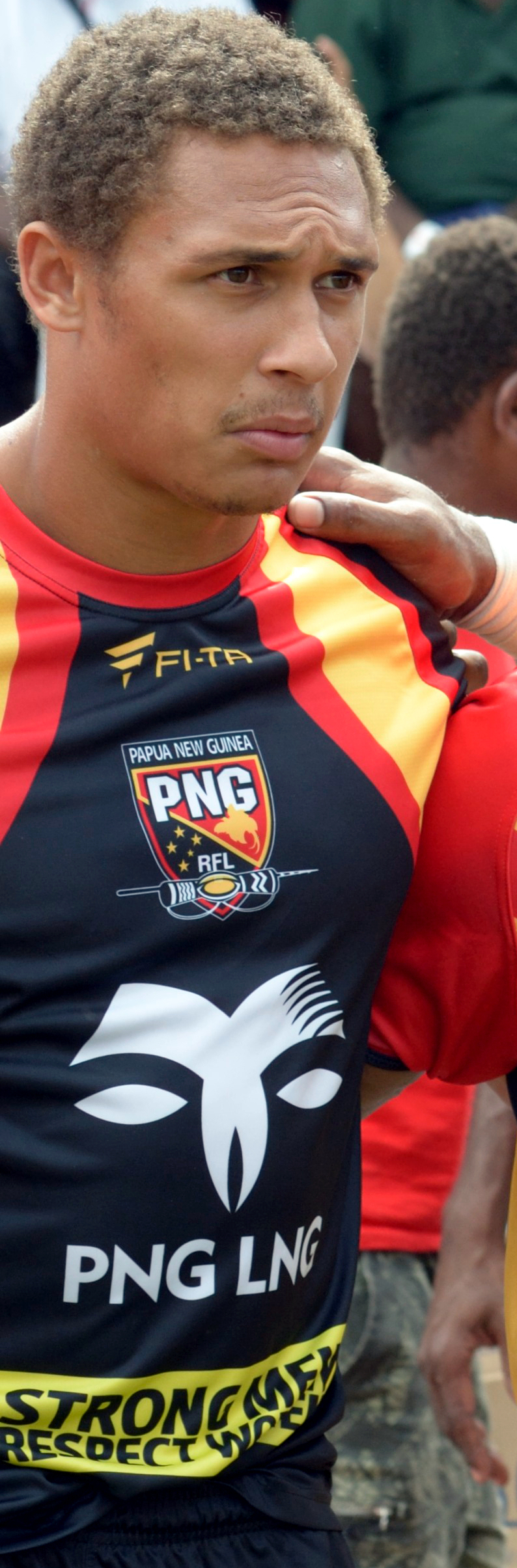

Personal information
- Full name: Raymond Thompson
- Born: 20 January 1990 (age 36) Cairns, Queensland, Australia
- Height: 175 cm (5 ft 9 in)
- Weight: 85 kg (13 st 5 lb)

Playing information
- Position: Halfback, Five-eighth, Hooker
Club
| Years | Team | Pld | T | G | FG | P |
|---|---|---|---|---|---|---|
| 2009–17 | North Qld Cowboys | 111 | 14 | 0 | 0 | 56 |
Representative
| Years | Team | Pld | T | G | FG | P |
| 2011 | PNG Prime Minister's XIII | 1 | 1 | 0 | 0 | 4 |
| 2011–15 | Papua New Guinea | 4 | 1 | 0 | 0 | 4 |
| 2015 | Indigenous All Stars | 1 | 0 | 0 | 0 | 0 |
- Source: As of 9 November 2023

Ray Thompson (born 20 January 1990), also known by the nickname of "Ray-Ray", is a former Papua New Guinea international rugby league footballer who played as a five-eighth, halfback and hooker. He was an Indigenous All Stars representative and spent his entire professional career with the North Queensland Cowboys in the National Rugby League (NRL).

== Background ==
Born in Cairns, Queensland, Thompson is of Indigenous Australian and Papua New Guinean descent. He played his junior football for Centrals ASA Tigers and attended Kirwan State High School before being signed by the North Queensland Cowboys. In 2007 as a 17-year-old. Thompson played a match for the Cowboys now folded feeder club the North Queensland Young Guns as experience for 2008 when the under 20's competition started. Thompson played 21 matches in the NYC in 2008 where he was one of the club's leading scorers playing at halfback. In the opening round of the 2009 NYC season, Thompson injured his shoulder and required a shoulder reconstruction which kept him out of action until Round 19 of the season. He played another 7 games after coming back from surgery.

== Playing career ==
=== 2009 ===
In Round 26, Thompson made his NRL debut for the Cowboys against the Sydney Roosters off the interchange bench in a 32–16 win at SFS. It was his sole appearance for the year.

=== 2010 ===
Thompson played in the opening 3 games of the NYC in 2010 until being called into the Cowboys NRL squad as a replacement for the out of form Grant Rovelli. Thompson had been one of the Cowboys best players in Rounds 4-7 before being cruelly hit by another shoulder injury that kept him out for the rest of the season.

=== 2011 ===
In the pre-season, Thompson was in a battle with Ben Jones and Michael Morgan for the Round 1 spot at five-eighth after the club had failed to make the top 8 in three consecutive seasons. The club had bought over 18 new players in 2011. Thompson ended up winning the five-eighth spot . In Round 21 against the Penrith Panthers, Thompson scored his first NRL try in the 30–18 win at 1300SMILES Stadium. Thompson went on to play in all of the Cowboys 25 matches, scoring on try. He was named the Cowboys most improved player at the end of the season. Thompson played in the Papua New Guinea side to take on Australia PM's 13 played in Lae, Papua New Guinea on 25 September 2011, where he was named PNG'S player of the match after he set up two tries and scored one himself in the 36–22 loss.

=== 2012 ===
The pre-season saw Thompson in yet another battle for a Cowboys jersey, this time the 7. The club had signed former Wests Tigers halfback Robert Lui to the club. Thompson had the upper hand in the battle after Lui was ruled out until Round 2 with a knee injury. Thompson started the year at Halfback, with Lui playing Queensland Cup. Lui was later suspended for the whole of the 2012 NRL season for off-field incidents, meaning Thompson would play the season in the number 7 jersey. On 18 May 2012, Thompson extended his contract his contract with the Cowboys for a further 3 years, to the end of the 2015 season. In Round 23 against the New Zealand Warriors, Thompson was ruled out for the rest of the year, requiring his third shoulder reconstruction in his career. He scored 5 tries from 18 matches in 2012.

=== 2013 ===
Throughout the early half of the 2013 NRL season, Thompson played in a rotating hooker position with fellow Cowboys teammate Rory Kostjasyn. In Round 22 against the Penrith Panthers, Thompson scored a hat trick in the Cowboys 36–4 win at Penrith Stadium. Thompson was the first NRL player to record 50 tackles and 3 score tries in a match, scoring the tries within 11 minutes. In Round 24, Thompson's year ended after suffering a broken jaw in a shoulder charge tackle from Newcastle Knights prop Kade Snowden. Thompson finished the 2013 NRL season with him playing in 19 matches and scoring 3 tries. Thompson was selected in the Papua New Guinea squad for the 2013 Rugby League World Cup, playing in all 3 matches in the tournament.

=== 2014 ===
In February 2014, Thompson was selected in the Cowboys winning inaugural 2014 Auckland Nines squad. Thompson finished the year with him playing in 22 matches and scoring one try.

=== 2015 ===
Thompson again played in the Cowboys Auckland Nines squad. On 13 February, he was selected at hooker for the Indigenous All Stars in the 2015 All Stars match at Cbus Super Stadium. The Indigenous side won 20–6 over the NRL All Stars. Thompson started the season with him playing for the Townsville Blackhawks in the Queensland Cup before earning a recall to the first grade team in Round 8 against the Newcastle Knights. On 2 May, Thompson played hooker for Papua New Guinea against Fiji in the 2015 Melanesian Cup in the Kumul's 22–10 loss at Cbus Super Stadium. Mid-season, Thompson extended his contract with the Cowboys to the end of the 2017 season. Thompson was the Cowboys 18th man for their 2015 NRL Grand Final against Queensland rivals the Brisbane Broncos, not taking part in the match. He finished the season with one try from 9 matches. On 15 December, Thompson was named in the interchange bench for the Indigenous All Stars team to play against the World All Stars on 13 February 2016.

=== 2016 ===
On 2 February 2016, Thompson was named in the Cowboys 2016 Auckland Nines squad. On 12 February 2016, the day before the 2016 All Stars match, Thompson injured his ankle at the Indigenous All Stars last training session before the match. Thompson is expected to miss about 12–14 weeks of football. In Round 12 against the St George Illawarra Dragons, Thompson made his return from injury, starting at halfback to replace Johnathan Thurston while he was on Origin duties in the Cowboys 14–10 loss at WIN Stadium. In Round 13 against the Newcastle Knights, Thompson played his 100th NRL career match and scored 2 tries in a Man of the Match-winning effort in the Cowboys 46–16 win at 1300SMILES Stadium.

=== 2017 ===
On 8 August, Thompson announced he would retire from rugby league following the 2017 NRL season, citing persistent knee injuries. On 1 October, he was the 18th man for the Cowboys in their 2017 NRL Grand Final loss to the Melbourne Storm. On 6 October, he was named the Cowboys' Club Person of the Year.

== Achievements and accolades ==
=== Individual ===
- North Queensland Cowboys Club Person of the Year: 2017
- North Queensland Cowboys Most Improved: 2011

=== Team ===
- 2014 NRL Auckland Nines: North Queensland Cowboys – Winners

== Statistics ==
=== NRL ===
Statistics are correct to the end of the 2016 season

| Season | Team | Matches | T | G | GK % | F/G | Pts |
|---|---|---|---|---|---|---|---|
| 2009 | North Queensland Cowboys | 1 | 0 | 0 | — | 0 | 0 |
| 2010 | North Queensland Cowboys | 4 | 0 | 0 | — | 0 | 0 |
| 2011 | North Queensland Cowboys | 25 | 1 | 0 | — | 0 | 4 |
| 2012 | North Queensland Cowboys | 18 | 5 | 0 | — | 0 | 20 |
| 2013 | North Queensland Cowboys | 19 | 3 | 0 | — | 0 | 12 |
| 2014 | North Queensland Cowboys | 22 | 1 | 0 | — | 0 | 4 |
| 2015 | North Queensland Cowboys | 9 | 1 | 0 | — | 0 | 4 |
| 2016 | North Queensland Cowboys | 7 | 3 | 0 | — | 0 | 12 |
| 2017 | North Queensland Cowboys | 6 | 0 | 0 | — | 0 | 0 |
| Career totals | | 111 | 14 | 0 | — | 0 | 56 |

=== International ===
| Season | Team | Matches | T | G | GK % | F/G | Pts |
|---|---|---|---|---|---|---|---|
| 2013 | Papua New Guinea | 3 | 0 | 0 | — | 0 | 0 |
| 2015 | Papua New Guinea | 1 | 0 | 0 | — | 0 | 0 |
| Career totals | | 4 | 0 | 0 | — | 0 | 0 |

== Personal life ==
Thompson and his partner Sabrina Galliozzi have one child together, a daughter named Ivy Rae. Following his retirement, Thompson joined the Cowboys' community team as an engagement and programs officer, working with former teammate Matthew Bowen.
