= Neville Costigan =

Former PNG international rugby league footballer

Nev Costigan
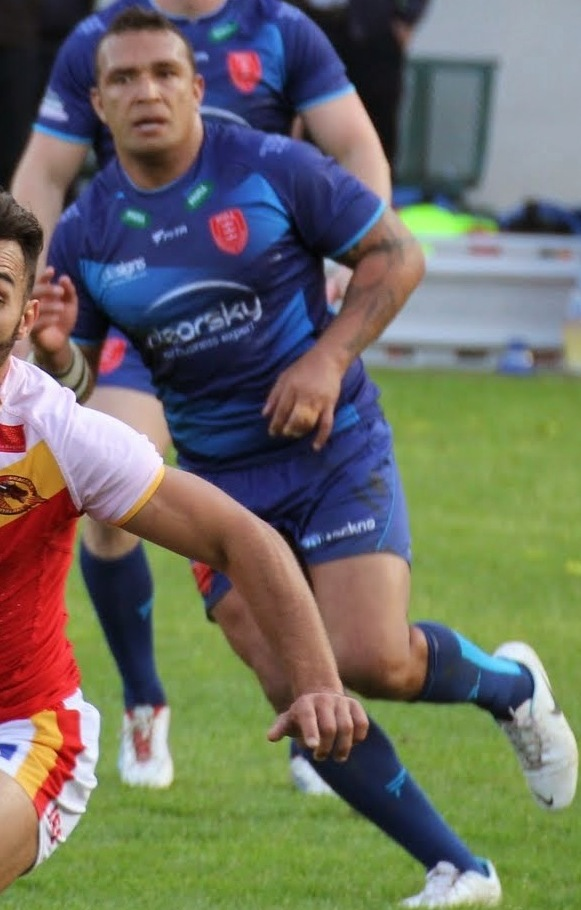

Personal information
- Full name: Neville Costigan
- Born: 16 March 1985 (age 41) Rabaul, East New Britain, Papua New Guinea

Playing information
- Height: 180 cm (5 ft 11 in)
- Weight: 101 kg (15 st 13 lb)
- Position: Lock, Second-row, Prop, Hooker
Club
| Years | Team | Pld | T | G | FG | P |
|---|---|---|---|---|---|---|
| 2003–06 | Brisbane Broncos | 45 | 4 | 0 | 0 | 16 |
| 2007–08 | Canberra Raiders | 25 | 5 | 0 | 0 | 20 |
| 2009–10 | St. George Illawarra | 42 | 5 | 0 | 0 | 20 |
| 2011–13 | Newcastle Knights | 57 | 6 | 0 | 0 | 24 |
| 2014 | Hull Kingston Rovers | 24 | 3 | 0 | 0 | 12 |
| | Total | 193 | 23 | 0 | 0 | 92 |
Representative
| Years | Team | Pld | T | G | FG | P |
| 2007–10 | Queensland | 6 | 0 | 0 | 0 | 0 |
| 2008–13 | Papua New Guinea | 6 | 0 | 0 | 0 | 0 |

Neville Costigan (born 16 March 1985) is a Papua New Guinean former professional rugby league footballer who played in the 2000s and 2010s. A Papua New Guinea international and Queensland State of Origin representative forward, he played in the National Rugby League for Australian clubs the Brisbane Broncos, the Canberra Raiders, the St. George Illawarra Dragons (with whom he won the 2010 NRL Grand Final) and Newcastle Knights. Costigan then finished his career in the Super League with Hull Kingston Rovers.

== Background ==
Born in Rabaul, Papua New Guinea on 16 March 1985, Costigan's father is Australian and his mother is from Dyaul Island. He played his junior football for the Mackay Wests Tigers in Queensland, Australia, having moved to Australia with his parents at a young age. Costigan was then signed by the Brisbane Broncos.

== Playing career ==
=== Brisbane Broncos ===
In Round 26 of the 2003 NRL season, Costigan made his NRL début for the Broncos against the St. George Illawarra Dragons. That year Costigan won the Broncos' Rookie of the Year award, and in his short time at the club, established a reputation as being a big hitter in defence.

In 2006, Costigan was involved in an off-field incident and had his contract terminated by the Broncos. It was revealed Costigan was charged with drink driving after he was caught driving around Brisbane, Queensland with a blood alcohol level of 0.13, almost three times the legal limit As a result, he missed the Broncos' 2006 NRL Grand Final victory.

=== Canberra Raiders ===
After being sacked by the Broncos, Costigan signed a contract with the Canberra Raiders starting in 2007. In 2007, Costigan was seen on video headbutting Sydney Roosters winger Amos Roberts at the conclusion of the Round 5 match between the Canberra Raiders and Sydney Roosters, which caused controversy. In May 2007, Costigan was selected for the Queensland State of Origin team. He retained his bench spot for the second game.

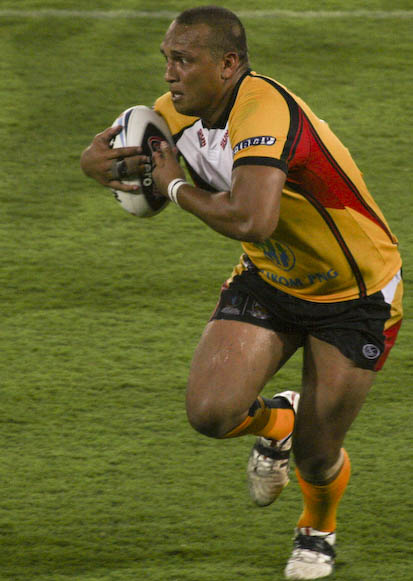
Costigan playing for PNG

On 13 August 2008, Costigan signed a 2-year contract with the St. George Illawarra Dragons starting in 2009, re-joining the coach that sacked him from the Brisbane Broncos, Wayne Bennett. In 2008, Costigan was named in the Papua New Guinea squad for the 2008 Rugby League World Cup. He was considered one of the 'Players to Watch' in the World Cup by NRL Live. Costigan went on to play 3 games for Papua New Guinea in the tournament.

=== St. George Illawarra Dragons ===
In April 2009, Costigan was named in the preliminary 25-man squad to represent Queensland in the opening State of Origin match for 2009. He was then selected on the bench for Game 3 after forwards Ben Hannant, Petero Civoniceva and Nate Myles were ruled out due to injury and suspension. In 2010, Costigan was selected for Queensland in all 3 matches of the 2010 State of Origin series. Costigan played prop in the Dragons' 2010 NRL Grand Final victory over the Sydney Roosters, with the Dragons winning 32–8, in which was his final game for the club. On 27 June 2010, Costigan signed a 3-year contract with the Newcastle Knights starting in 2011.

=== Newcastle Knights ===
Costigan said about the move, "Newcastle is a club I am excited about going to, I have now played 100 NRL games and would like to think that I can achieve the 200 game milestone at the Knights. I had other options but I like the town, the lifestyle it offers, their fanatical supporters and the fact I can play a part in the direction the club is heading over the next couple of years. I am also impressed with the coaching staff and other people associated with the Knights that I have met." On 12 April 2011, it was announced that Costigan's former Brisbane Broncos and St. George Illawarra Dragons coach, Wayne Bennett had signed a 4-year contract with the Newcastle Knights starting in 2012, making the Knights the third club that Costigan and Bennett had been at together. On 22 July 2013, Costigan signed a 2-year contract with Super League side Hull Kingston Rovers starting in 2014, re-joining former Knights assistant coach Craig Sandercock.

=== Hull Kingston Rovers ===
Costigan commenced playing in England in 2014, but left the club after one season due to "personal reasons".

=== Townsville Blackhawks ===
In December 2014, Costigan signed a 2-year contract with Queensland Cup side, Townsville Blackhawks, starting in 2015.
