= Brenden Santi =

Italy international rugby league footballer

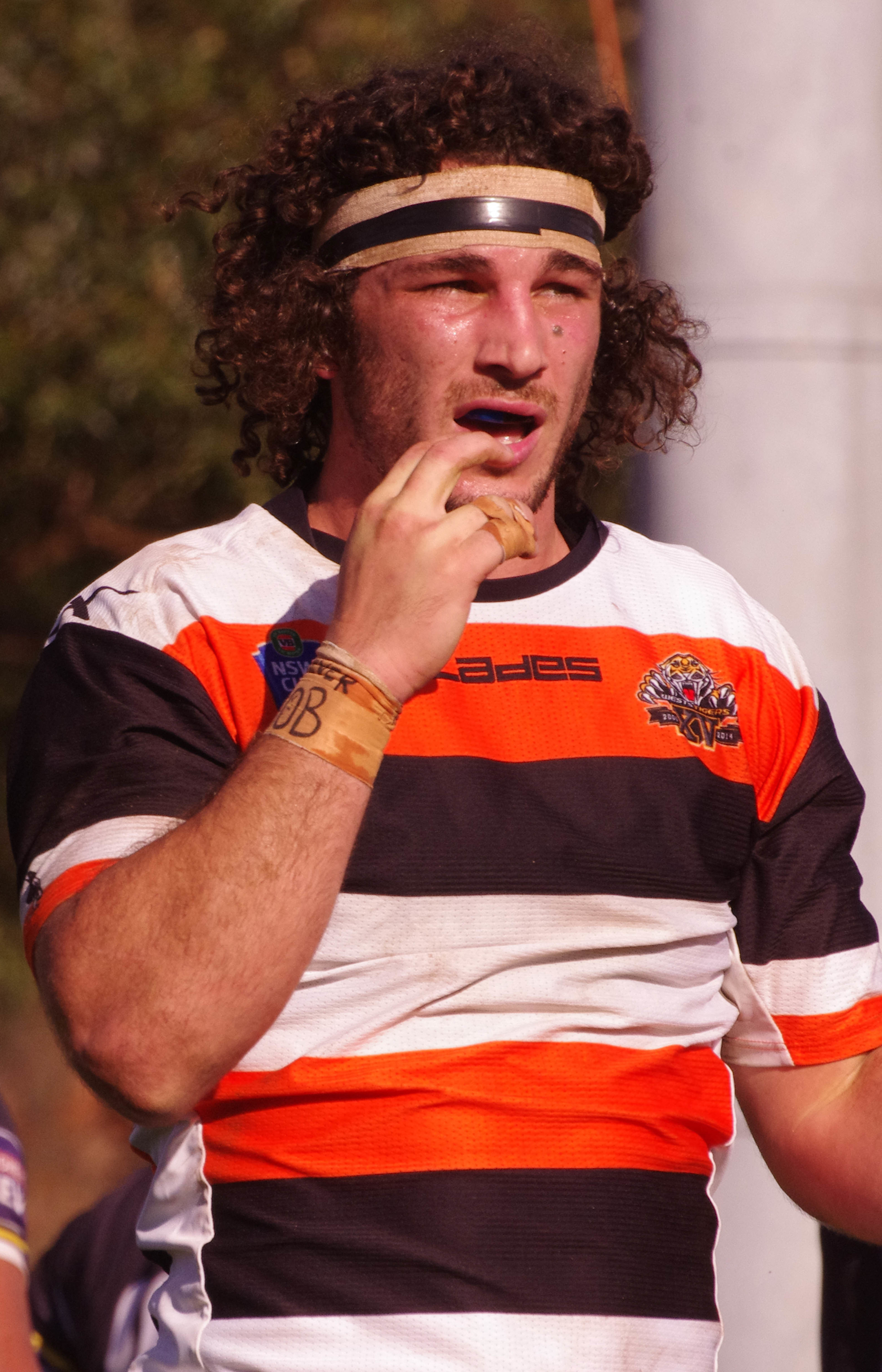

Personal information
- Born: 5 August 1993 (age 33) Bankstown, New South Wales, Australia
- Height: 187 cm (6 ft 2 in)
- Weight: 101 kg (15 st 13 lb)

Playing information
- Position: Lock
Club
Years	Team	Pld	T	G	FG	P
2014–15	Wests Tigers	11	0	0	0	0
2019	Toulouse Olympique	19	1	0	0	4
2020	Newcastle Thunder	5	0	0	0	0
2021–23	Keighley Cougars	47	15	0	0	60
2023–	York Knights	67	8	0	0	32
2026	→ Newcastle Thunder (DR)	0	0	0	0	0
	Total	149	24	0	0	96
Representative
Years	Team	Pld	T	G	FG	P
2013–22	Italy	15	4	0	0	16
- Source: As of 15 November 2026

Brenden Santi (born 5 August 1993) is an Italy international rugby league footballer who plays as a prop, second-row or loose forward for Newcastle Thunder in the RFL Championship on DR loan from the York Knights in the English Super League.

He previously played for the Wests Tigers in the NRL.

== Background ==
Santi was born in Bankstown, New South Wales, Australia and is of Italian descent.

He played his junior rugby league for the Chester Hill Hornets before being signed by the Canterbury-Bankstown Bulldogs.

== Playing career ==
=== Wests Tigers ===
In 2010, Santi was a part of the Canterbury-Bankstown Bulldogs' NYC squad but didn't play a game. He joined the Wests Tigers and played for their NYC team from 2011 to 2013.

During his initial period with the Wests Tigers, Santi captained the Australian Schoolboys in 2011, and played in the Tigers' 2012 NYC Grand Final win over the Canberra Raiders. He also played for the New South Wales Under 20s team, winning the Players' Player award. At the end of 2013, Santi played for Italy at the 2013 Rugby League World Cup, playing three games from the bench.

=== Parramatta Eels ===
Santi signed a two-year contract with the Parramatta Eels starting in 2014. Coach Ricky Stuart said, "Brenden ticks a lot of boxes in regards to the type of player we want to build our club around - no nonsense and tough with a high work rate."

By the start of 2014, Stuart had been replaced as Eels coach by Brad Arthur. On 8 May 2014, Santi returned to the Wests Tigers mid-season on a contract to the end of 2015. Santi said, "I did what most young kids would do and left [Wests Tigers] for an opportunity. I wasn't filthy, because they had a lot of quality first graders in front of me. I got bought by Ricky Stuart, [but] Brad Arthur had other plans at Parramatta. And I don't think I was in them."

In round 25 of the 2014 NRL season, Santi made his NRL debut for the Tigers against the Canberra Raiders, in what was his only appearance for the season.

Santi played in 10 games in 2015, all from the bench. He was not re-signed at the end of the season.

=== Townsville Blackhawks ===
In 2016, he joined the Townsville Blackhawks in the Queensland Cup. At the end of the 2016 season, he joined the Sydney Roosters for 2017. In October, he represented Italy at the 2017 Rugby League World Cup.

In 2018, Santi re-joined the Townsville Blackhawks, after spending the entire 2017 season playing for the Roosters' feeder club, the Wyong Roos, in the New South Wales Cup.

=== Toulouse Olympique ===
In the 2019 season, Santi played for French side Toulouse Olympique making 19 appearances.

=== Newcastle Thunder ===
On 21 December 2019, Santi signed for the Newcastle Thunder for the 2020 League 1 season.

=== Keighley Cougars ===
On 30 October 2020 it was announced that Santi would join Keighley Cougars for the 2021 season At the end of the 2021 season Santi signed a two-year contract extension with Keighley tying him to the club until the end of the 2023 season.

=== York RLFC ===
On 30 June 2023, Santi signed a contract to join York RLFC until the end of the 2023 season. On 2 December 2024, Santi had re-signed with the club for the 2025 season. On 7 June 2025, Santi played in York's 1895 Cup final victory over Featherstone.

=== Newcastle Thunder (DR) ===
On 14 January 2026 it was reported that he had signed for Newcastle Thunder in the RFL Championship on DR loan

=== International ===
Santi was named in the Italian squad for the 2021 Rugby League World Cup.
