= Davies Park =

Sporting venue in Brisbane, Queensland

Coordinates: 27°28′43″S 153°0′18″E

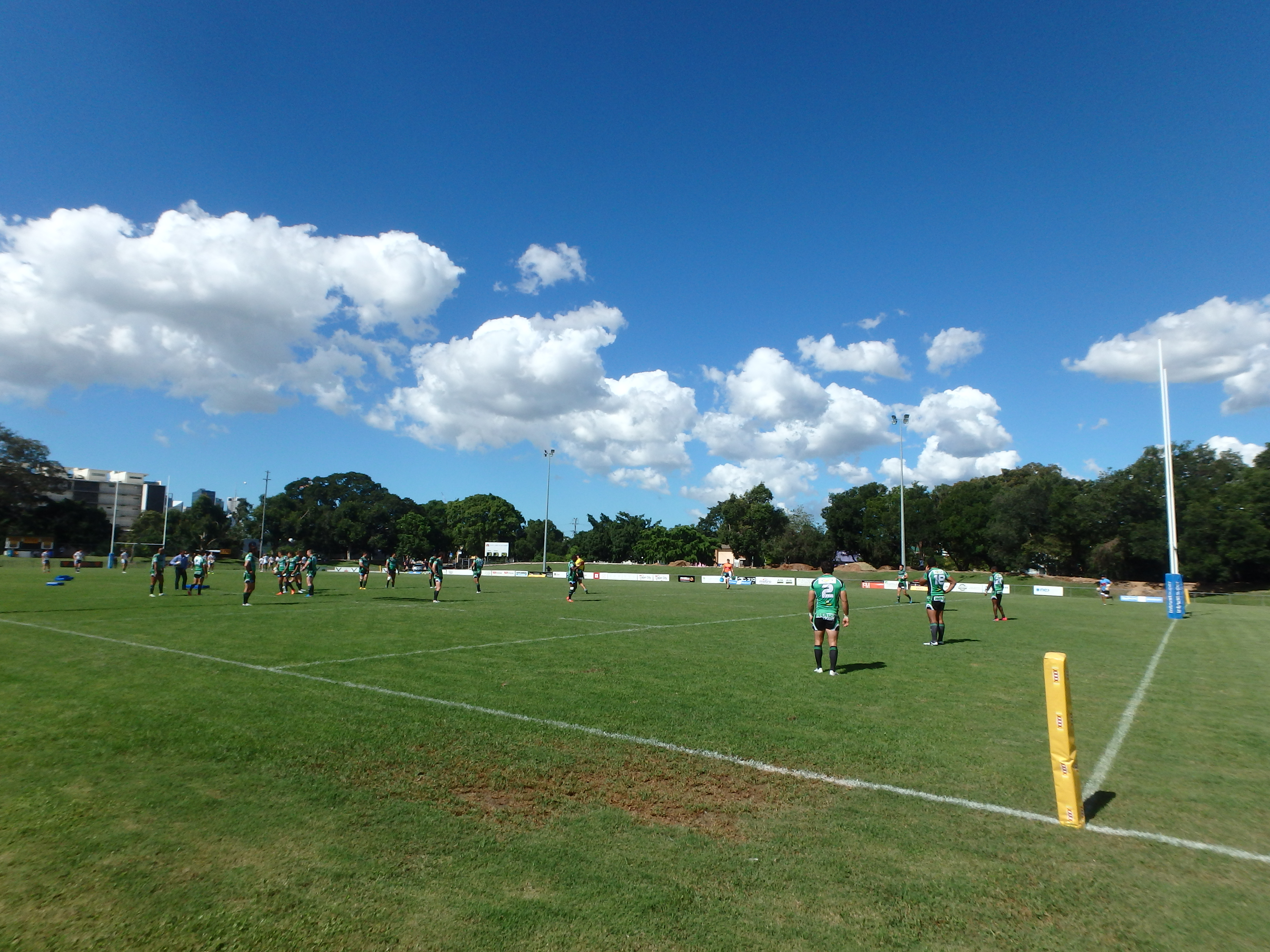
- Davies Park, 2015
- Interactive map of Davies Park
- Location: West End, Queensland

Tenant
- Souths Logan Magpies

Davies Park is a sporting venue in the suburb of West End in Brisbane, Queensland, Australia. It is grass. It is located at the corner of Jane St, Montague Road & Riverside Drive, West End. It is the home ground of the Souths Logan Magpies, a rugby league team that competes in the Queensland Cup, and West End Football Club (Soccer) that compete in Football Queensland competitions.

== History ==
Six acres of land was purchased by John Hardgrave in 1860. Brisbane City Council took over the land from owner Phillip Hardgrave in the 1880s. In 1901 Davies Park was developed.

During the 1920s and early 1930s, Davies Park also played host to Motorcycle speedway, including hosting the Australian Solo Championship for both 2¾ hp and 3½ hp bikes in 1929.
