= Mosese Pangai =

Tonga international rugby league footballer

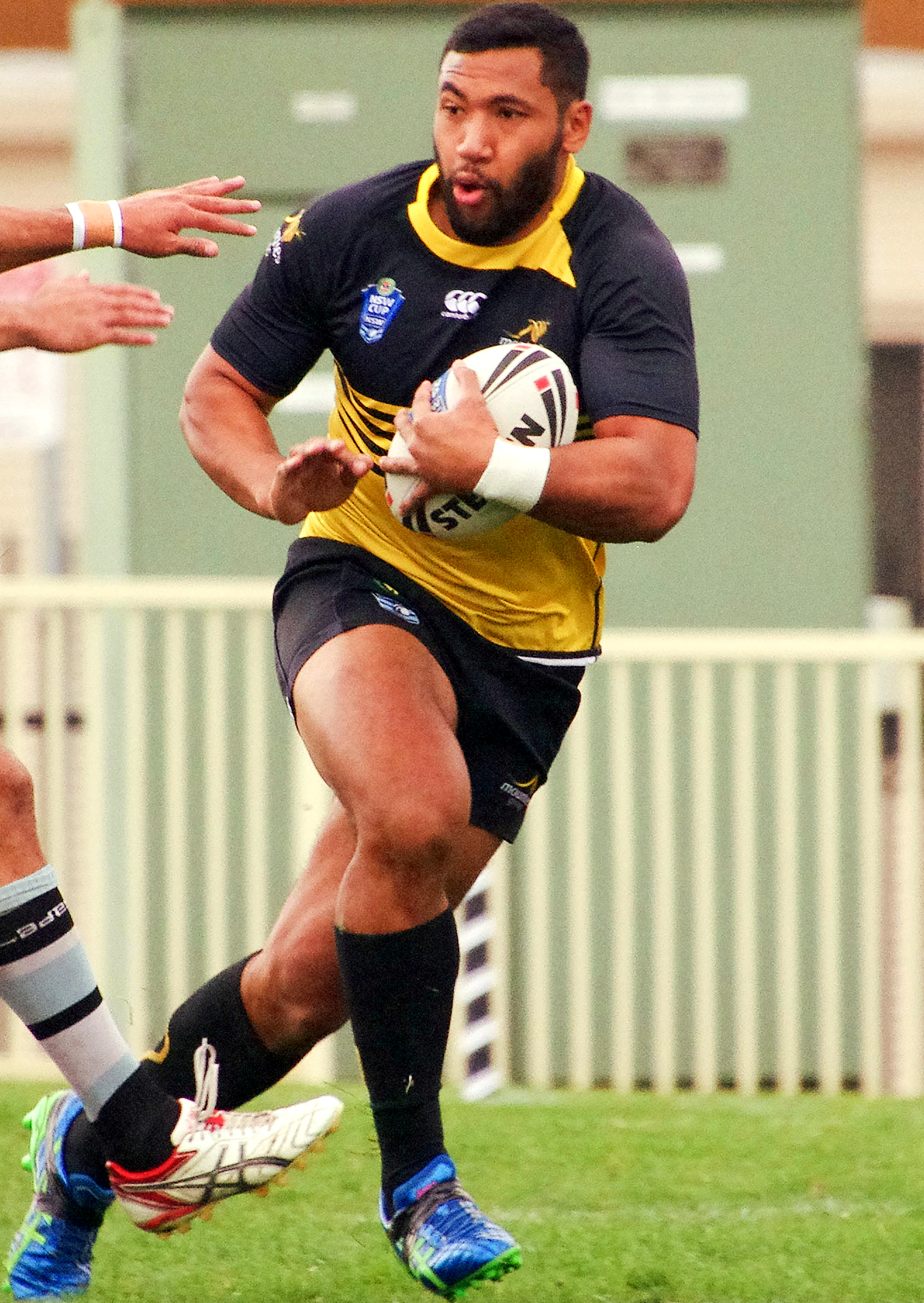

Personal information
- Born: 18 December 1991 (age 34) Newcastle, New South Wales, Australia
- Height: 191 cm (6 ft 3 in)
- Weight: 111 kg (17 st 7 lb)

Playing information
- Position: Centre, Wing
Club
Years	Team	Pld	T	G	FG	P
2012	North Qld Cowboys	1	0	0	0	0
Representative
Years	Team	Pld	T	G	FG	P
2015–16	Tonga	2	1	0	0	4
- Source: As of 25 February 2018
- Education: Endeavour Sports High School
- Relatives: David Pangai (brother); Tevita Pangai Junior (brother)

Mosese Pangai (born 18 December 1991), anglicised Moses Pangai, is a Tonga international rugby league footballer who last played as a centre or on the wing for the North Queensland Cowboys in the NRL.

== Background ==
Pangai was born in Newcastle, New South Wales, Australia. He is of Tongan descent.

== Early career ==
Pangai played his junior rugby league for the Concord Burwood Wolves in Sydney and was a highly touted prospect coming up through the Balmain Tigers/Wests Tigers junior systems. After representing the New South Wales Combined High Schools Under 15's the year before, Pangai made his Toyota Cup debut in 2008 for the Wests Tigers at 16 years old.

== North Queensland Cowboys ==
After six Toyota Cup games for the Tigers, Pangai signed with the North Queensland Cowboys. He would go on to play 73 games for the Cowboys Toyota Cup (Under-20s) teamfrom 2009 to 2011, scoring 27 tries and helping them to the 2011 Grand Final, which they lost in extra time to the New Zealand Warriors. While living in Townsville, Pangai attended Ignatius Park College.

Pangai was rewarded for a great 2011 season by being selected for the Junior Kangaroos and being elevated to the Cowboys first grade squad for 2012. He made his first grade debut on the wing in the 18–0, round 1 loss to the Gold Coast Titans.

== Later career ==
In August 2012, Pangai signed a two-year deal to join the Penrith Panthers.

In June 2013, Pangai was released by the Penrith club without playing a game and signed with the Wests Tigers. In 2014, Pangai joined Mounties in the NSW Cup.

Between 2015 and 2016, Pangai played for the Townsville Blackhawks in the Queensland Cup. On 3 August 2016, Pangai signed for Brisbane but made no first grade appearances with the club.

In October 2015 Pangai was surprisingly selected in the final 18-man Tonga national rugby league team squad after not being initially selected in the 48-man preliminary train-on squad. On 17 October 2015, Mosese played for Tonga in their Asia-Pacific Qualifier match against the Cook Islands for the 2017 Rugby League World Cup.

On 7 May 2016, Pangai played for Tonga against Samoa in the 2016 Polynesian Cup where he played on the wing, scoring 1 try in the 18–6 loss at Parramatta Stadium.

In 2017, Pangai signed for Redcliffe in the Queensland Cup. He made 28 appearances for the club over two seasons. In 2019, Pangai played for Wynnum-Manly.
