= Glenn Hall (rugby league) =

Australian rugby league footballer (born 1981)

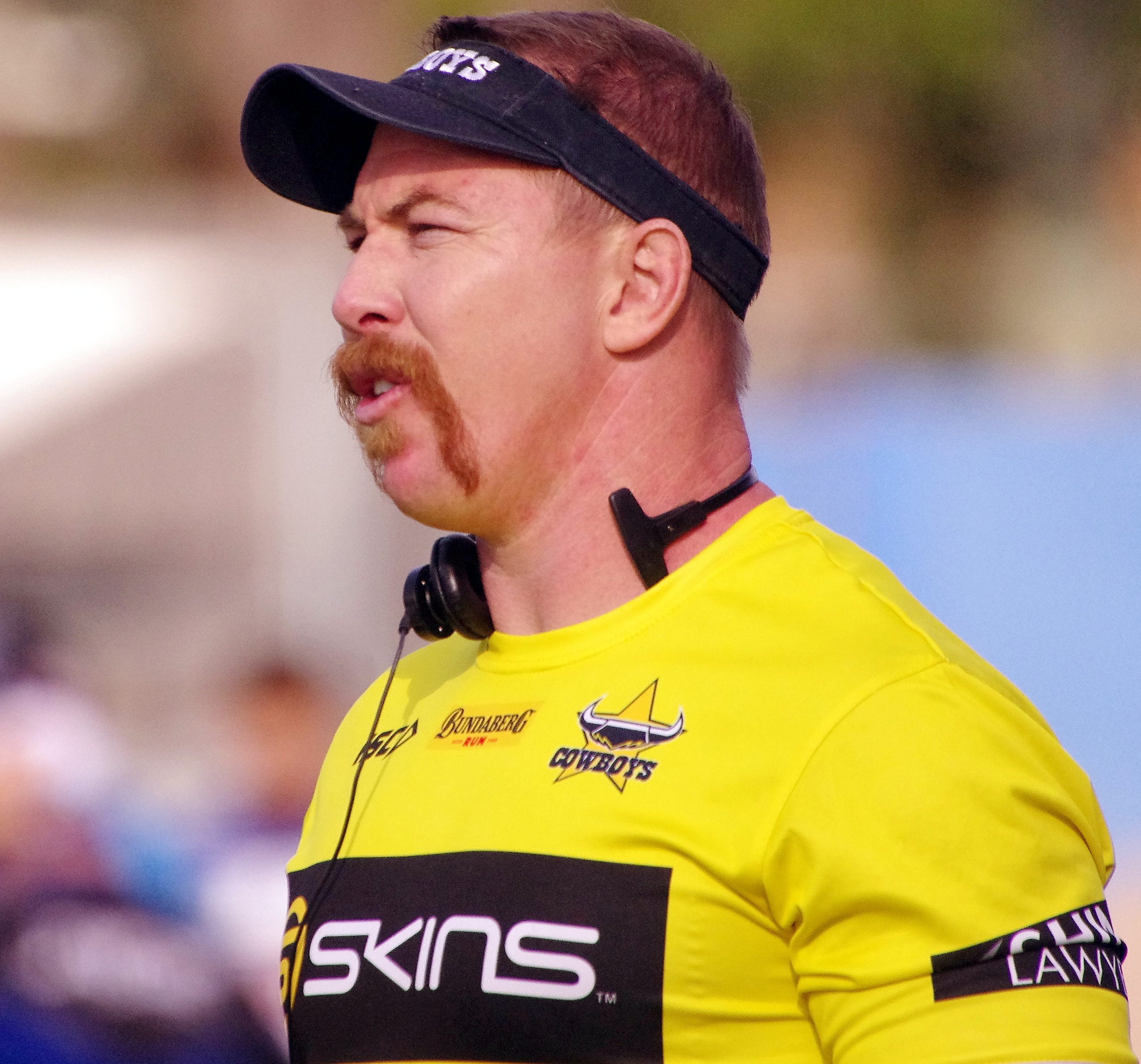

Personal information
- Born: 21 March 1981 (age 45) City of Bankstown, New South Wales, Australia

Playing information
- Height: 186 cm (6 ft 1 in)
- Weight: 103 kg (16 st 3 lb)
- Position: Second-row, Prop
Club
Years	Team	Pld	T	G	FG	P
2002–03	Canterbury Bulldogs	8	3	0	0	12
2004–05	South Sydney	19	2	0	0	8
2006	Sydney Roosters	2	0	0	0	0
2007–09	Manly Sea Eagles	65	11	0	0	44
2010	Bradford Bulls	28	5	1	0	22
2011–15	North Qld Cowboys	98	13	0	0	52
	Total	220	34	1	0	138

Glenn Hall (born 21 March 1981) is an Australian former professional rugby league footballer. He played for the Canterbury-Bankstown Bulldogs, the South Sydney Rabbitohs, the Sydney Roosters, the Manly Warringah Sea Eagles, with which he won the 2008 NRL premiership and 2009 World Club Challenge with and the North Queensland Cowboys in the National Rugby League, while also had a stint in the Super League with the Bradford Bulls. He primarily played as a second-row and prop.

== Background ==
Born and raised in Sydney, New South Wales, Hall played his junior football in the Bankstown area for St Christopher's, Panania.

== Playing career ==
Hall joined his local club, the Canterbury-Bankstown Bulldogs, as a teenager and played in their back-to-back Jersey Flegg Cup premiership-winning teams in 1999 and 2000. He started 2001 in Jersey Flegg, before being elevated to the Bulldogs' First Division side mid-season.

=== 2002–2003 ===
In round 12 of the 2002 NRL season, Hall made his NRL début for Canterbury-Bankstown. In Round 15, he scored two tries, his first in the NRL, in the club's 46–6 victory over the Canberra Raiders. He finished the 2002 NRL season playing in the Bulldogs premiership-winning Premier League side. In 2003, he played 5 more games for the club before signing with the South Sydney Rabbitohs for the 2004 NRL season.

While at Canterbury-Bankstown, Hall played alongside future North Queensland Cowboys teammate Johnathan Thurston.

=== 2004–2005 ===
In 2004, Hall played a then career-high 16 NRL games for South Sydney, starting half of his games at prop. In 2005, he only managed 3 games for the club, before signing with arch rivals the Sydney Roosters for 2006.

=== 2006 ===
Hall endured another disappointing season in 2006, only playing 2 games for the Roosters, before leaving the club and joining his fourth club, the Manly-Warringah Sea Eagles.

Hall played in the 2006 NSW Cup grand final for Newtown, who were the Sydney Roosters feeder club at the time, against Parramatta. Newtown would lose the grand final 20–19 at Stadium Australia.

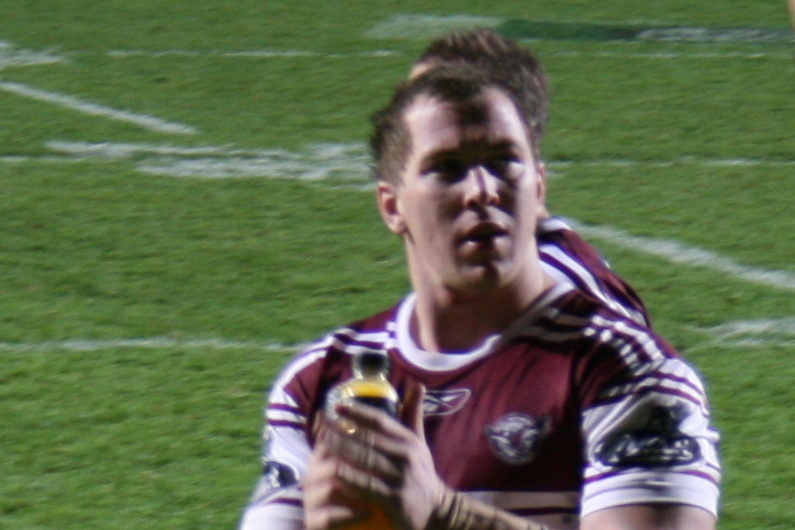
Hall at the celebration of the winning of the 2008 NRL Grand Final

=== 2007–2009 ===
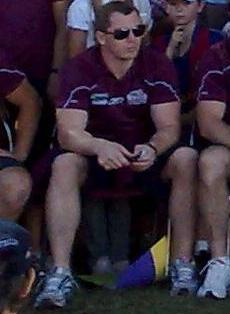
Hall with the Manly Sea Eagles

In 2007, Hall became a regular member of Manly's first grade team, playing 23 games before he injured his shoulder late in the regular season, and missed Manly's finals campaign, including the grand final defeat by the Melbourne Storm.

In 2008, Hall played 20 games and scored 6 tries for Manly-Warringah. He started in the second-row in Manly's record-breaking 40-0 NRL Grand Final victory over Melbourne.

In February 2009, Hall was a member of the Manly side that won the 2009 World Club Challenge against the Leeds Rhinos. In his last season for Manly, he played 22 games and scored 3 tries.

=== 2010 ===
Hall moved to England to join the Bradford Bulls for the 2010 Super League season. He left the club by mutual consent after a season in which he found himself dropped to the Bulls' reserve team.

=== 2011–2015 ===
In January 2011, Hall signed a two-year contract to play for the North Queensland Cowboys. He was named in the North Queensland leadership group and was also one of their vice-captains. That season, Hall played 23 games for the club and was a member of the team's finals match against the Manly-Warringah Sea Eagles, starting the game in the second row. He averaged 24 tackles and 70 metres a game.

On 25 May 2012, Hall re-signed with the North Queensland club until the end of the 2013 NRL season. He played 23 games, scoring 4 tries and starting the majority of his games in the second-row.

In round 10 of 2013 NRL season, Hall played his 150th NRL game in the Cowboys' 12–8 loss to the Sydney Roosters. Later that year, he signed a one-year contract extension with the Cowboys.

On 10 October 2014, Hall extended his stay with North Queensland for a further season, re-signing with the club until the end of 2015.

On 31 August 2015, Hall announced his retirement from rugby league at the end of the 2015 NRL season.

On 27 September 2015, Hall played in the Townsville Blackhawks Intrust Super Cup Grand Final loss to the Ipswich Jets.

== Post playing ==
As of 2020, Hall has been in a behind the scenes role at the North Queensland Cowboys.

== Achievements and accolades ==
=== Individual ===
North Queensland Cowboys Club Person of the Year: 2015

=== Team ===
2008 NRL Grand Final: Manly-Warringah Sea Eagles – Winners
2009 World Club Challenge: Manly-Warringah Sea Eagles – Winners

== Statistics ==
=== NRL / Super league ===
†	Denotes seasons in which Hall won an NRL Premiership

Season	Team	Matches	T	G	GK %	F/G	Pts
2002	Canterbury-Bankstown Bulldogs	3	2	0	—	0	8
2003	Canterbury-Bankstown Bulldogs	5	1	0	—	0	4
2004	South Sydney Rabbitohs	16	2	0	—	0	8
2005	South Sydney Rabbitohs	3	0	0	—	0	0
2006	Sydney Roosters	2	0	0	—	0	0
2007	Manly Warringah Sea Eagles	23	2	0	—	0	8
2008†	Manly Warringah Sea Eagles	20	6	0	—	0	24
2009	Manly Warringah Sea Eagles	22	5	0	—	0	20
2010	Bradford Bulls	28	5	1	100%		22
2011	North Queensland Cowboys	23	5	0	—	0	20
2012	North Queensland Cowboys	23	4	0	—	0	16
2013	North Queensland Cowboys	25	2	0	—	0	8
2014	North Queensland Cowboys	24	2	0	—	0	8
2015	North Queensland Cowboys	3	0	0	—	0	0
Career totals		192	29	0	—	0	116

== Personal life ==
Hall resides in Townsville with his wife Kylie Hall (née Butler) and their two children.
