= Anthony Mitchell (rugby league) =

Australian rugby league footballer

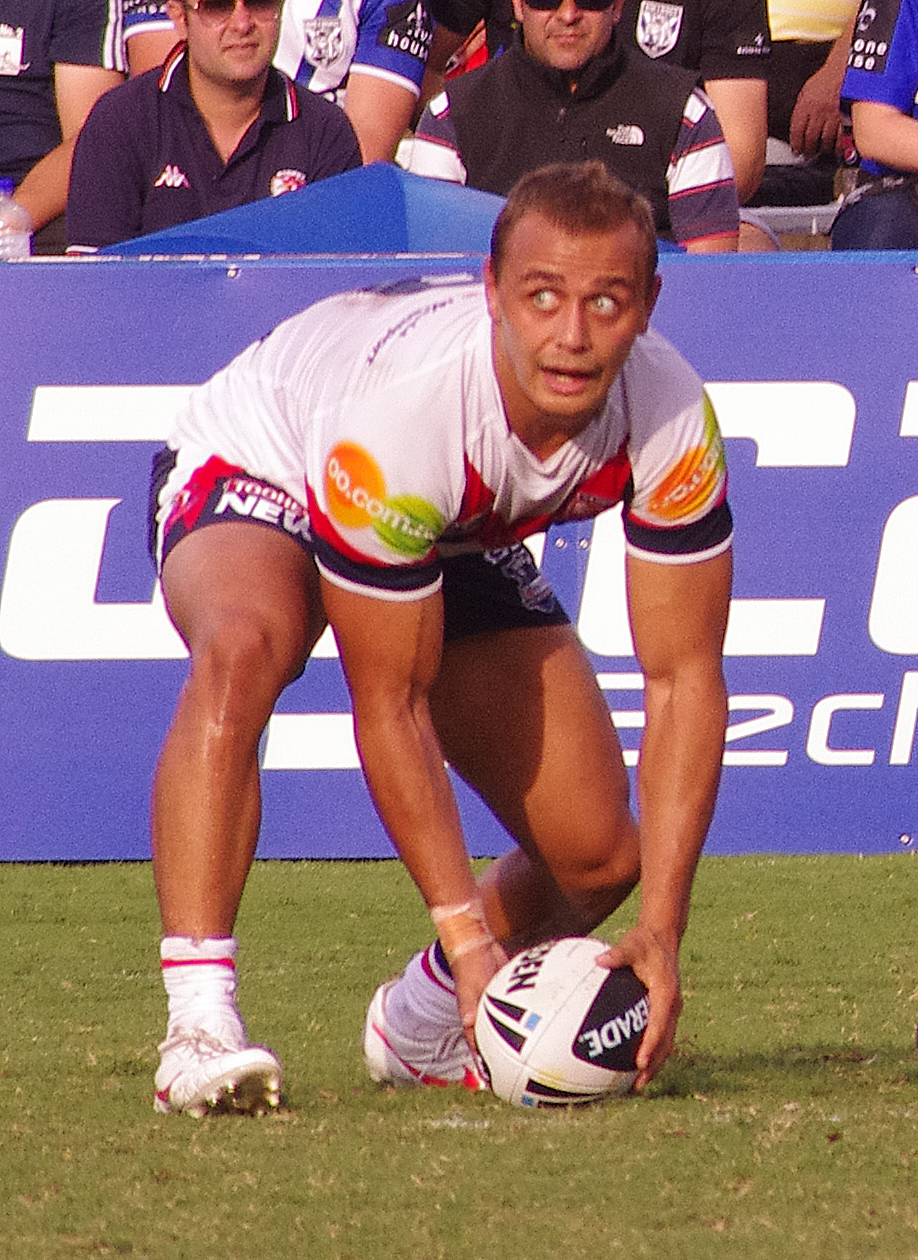

Personal information
- Born: 27 May 1989 (age 37) Brisbane, Queensland, Australia
- Height: 178 cm (5 ft 10 in)
- Weight: 85 kg (13 st 5 lb)

Playing information
- Position: Hooker
Club
Years	Team	Pld	T	G	FG	P
2010–11	Parramatta Eels	7	2	0	0	8
2011–12	Sydney Roosters	16	1	0	0	4
2012–14	North Qld Cowboys	16	1	0	0	4
	Total	39	4	0	0	16
Representative
Years	Team	Pld	T	G	FG	P
2011–12	Indigenous All Stars	2	0	0	0	0
2016	Queensland Residents	1	0	0	0	0
- Source: As of 7 January 2024

Anthony Mitchell (born 27 May 1989, in Brisbane, Queensland) is an Australian former professional rugby league footballer who played for the North Queensland Cowboys, Sydney Roosters and Parramatta Eels. An Indigenous All Stars representative hooker, he played in the National Rugby League for Parramatta Eels, Sydney Roosters and North Queensland Cowboys.

== Early career ==
Born in Brisbane, Mitchell was spent his early childhood in Brisbane. At the age of five, Mitchell's parents separated and the family moved to Townsville, there he and his brother were raised by their father, Steve, and their grandmother, Margaret. In Townsville, Mitchell began playing rugby league for Townsville Brothers and attended the well known rugby league high school Ignatius Park College. He was selected for the Australian Institute of Sport under 18's tour of France and England in 2006 and represented the Queensland under 19 side in 2007. He joined the Parramatta Eels junior system at age 17 and starred for them in the inaugural National Youth Competition in 2008, playing in all 26 of the Eels matches that season.

In 2009 Mitchell played just 12 matches of the Toyota Cup, due to injuries. During this season Mitchell was moved between Hooker Interchange and Five-eighth, he captained the Eels for two games that season.

== Parramatta Eels ==
After spending the majority of the season playing for the Eels feeder team, the Wentworthville Magpies, Mitchell was called up to play first grade near the end of the 2010 season. He made his first grade debut for Parramatta against the Brisbane Broncos, scoring a try in the win. He would play two more games that year for the club. Despite only three NRL games under his belt, Mitchell was selected to play for the Indigenous All Stars after Preston Campbell was forced to withdraw due to injury.

== Sydney Roosters ==
In 2011, after just seven games for Parramatta (four in 2011), Mitchell signed with the Sydney Roosters mid-season. He played ten games for the club that season. In 2012, Mitchell was again called up to the Indigenous All Stars. Mitchell impressed with little game time during his 12 months at the Sydney Roosters.

== North Queensland Cowboys ==
In June 2012, after playing seventeen games for the Sydney Roosters (7 in 2012), Mitchell made his second mid-season switch in two years, signing with his home town team, the North Queensland Cowboys. Mitchell was released from the Sydney Roosters on 25 June, just five days before the 30 June deadline. He arrived in Townsville the following day and completed his first training session with the team. Mitchell lined up against the New Zealand Warriors that week wearing the number 19 jersey, he was a late inclusion for the dropped Cory Paterson, Mitchell played 60 minutes and impressed the coaching staff, earning an interchange bench spot against the Melbourne Storm a week a later.

Mitchell said that playing for the North Queensland Cowboys was a dream come true for him and that he had no regrets leaving the Sydney Roosters during the mid-season. Mitchell scored his first try for the club in North Queensland's 29–16 win against the Wests Tigers in round 19 of the 2012 season. He was contracted with the North Queensland outfit until the end of the 2013 season.

In round 25 of the 2012 season, Mitchell was a match-day replacement for injured halfback Michael Morgan, played a role in all three of North Queensland's tries as they held out an onslaught by Newcastle late in the first half to move, North Queensland won the match 22–14.

== Townsville Blackhawks ==
Mitchell left the North Queensland Cowboys when his contract expired at the end of the 2014 season and joined the newly formed Townsville Blackhawks in the Queensland Cup.

After three seasons with the Townsville Blackhawks, including one as captain, Mitchell retired from rugby league at the end of 2017. He finished his career as the Townsville Blackhawks' most capped player.

== Post-playing career ==
In 2022, Mitchell co-founded the Nines Premier League, a 9-a-side rugby league tournament held annually over the Australia Day weekend.
