= Lorenzo Ma'afu =

New Zealand rugby league footballer (born 1987)

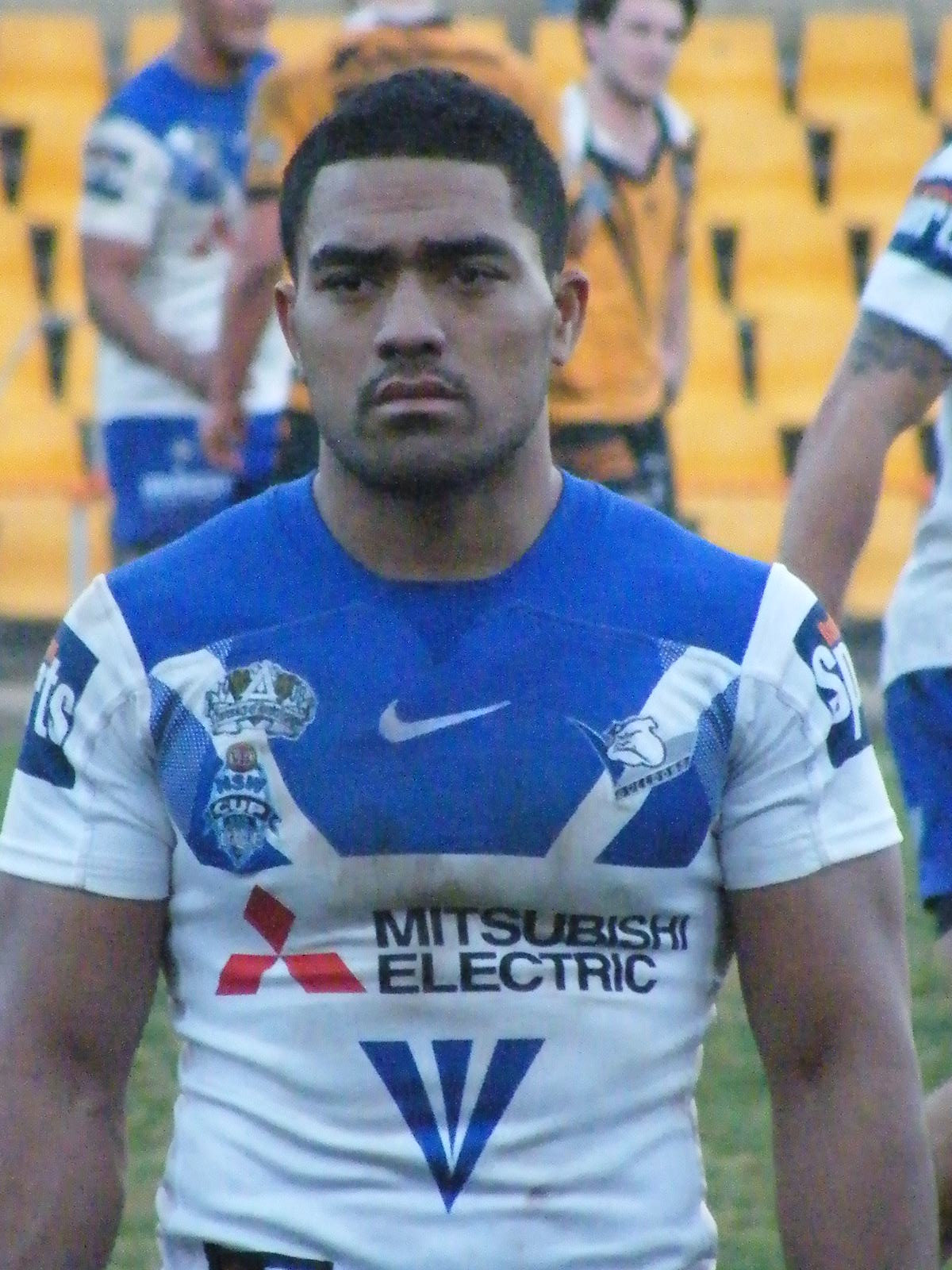
- Ma'afu playing for the Bulldogs in 2008

Personal information
- Full name: Lorenzo Ma'afu
- Born: 13 November 1987 (age 38) New Zealand
- Height: 181 cm (5 ft 11 in)
- Weight: 100 kg (15 st 10 lb)

Playing information
- Position: Second-row
Club
Years	Team	Pld	T	G	FG	P
2008	Canterbury-Bankstown	2	0	0	0	0
Representative
Years	Team	Pld	T	G	FG	P
2011	Queensland Residents	1	0	0	0	0
- Source: As of 5 January 2024

Lorenzo Ma'afu (born 13 November 1987) is a New Zealand former professional rugby league footballer who last played for the Burleigh Bears in the Queensland Cup. He primarily played second-row. Ma'afu is of Tongan descent. Ma'afu was well known for overcoming much adversity to make it into the NRL.

== Early life ==
Born in New Zealand, before moving to Australia. Ma'afu played his junior football for the East Hills Bulldogs in Australia before being signed by Canterbury.

== Canterbury-Bankstown ==
In round 9 of the 2008 NRL season he made his NRL debut for the Canterbury-Bankstown Bulldogs against the Penrith Panthers. He made one further appearance for Canterbury which came in round 12 against Melbourne which Canterbury lost 46-0.

== Ipswich Jets ==
In 2009, he joined the Ipswich Jets in the Intrust Super Cup.

== 2012-14 ==
At the start of 2012, Ma'afu was close to joining NRL club, the Manly-Warringah Sea Eagles but nothing eventuated as Sea Eagles recruitment manager, Noel Cleal, who wanted to sign him, went to the Canterbury-Bankstown Bulldogs before anything was finalized. Ma'afu was invited to do pre-season training with the Gold Coast Titans.

In June 2012, Ma'afu was invited to come down for a week to train with the Newcastle Knights at the request of Knights coach Wayne Bennett in order to possibly gain a contract.

In September 2012, Ma'afu signed a two-year contract with the Parramatta Eels.

== Townsville Blackhawks ==
In 2015, Ma'afu joined Townsville and played two seasons with the club.

== Burleigh Bears ==
In 2017, Ma'afu joined Burleigh and made 12 appearances during the 2017 season.

== Later career ==
In 2021, it was reported that Ma'afu was playing for the Mudgeeraba Redbacks in the local Gold Coast A-Grade competition.

== Controversy ==
In 2010, he was banned from the sport for 15 months after his drink was spiked with ecstasy and another recreational drug. Ma'afu's ban expired on 1 February 2011 and he returned to play for the Jets.
