= 2019 Mackay Cutters season =

- Queensland Cup Rank: 11th
- Play-off result: Missed finals
- 2019 record: Wins: 7; draws: 0; losses: 16
- Points scored: For: 416; against: 566

Team information
- CEO: Maurie Fatnowna
- Coach: Steve Sheppard
- Captain: Cooper Bambling
- Stadium: BB Print Stadium

Top scorers
- Tries: Yamba Bowie; Reuben Cotter (9)
- Goals: Carlin Anderson (39)
- Points: Carlin Anderson (102)
| ← 2018 | 2020 → |

The 2019 Mackay Cutters season was the 12th in the club's history. Coached by Steve Sheppard and captained by Cooper Bambling, they competed in the QRL's Intrust Super Cup. The club missed the finals for the sixth consecutive season, finishing in 11th place.

== Season summary ==
After another last place finish in 2018, the Cutters underwent another roster overhaul, losing both starting front rowers, Nick Brown and Jordan Grant, to the Redcliffe Dolphins and key outside backs Nicho Hynes and Nathan Saumalu to the Sunshine Coast Falcons. In turn, they recruited former Super League players Alex Gerrard and Lloyd White from the Widnes Vikings, Sam Cook from the New Zealand Warriors, and Ross Bella, Paul Byrnes, Jordan Kenworthy and David Munro from the Townsville Blackhawks.

The club endured another tough season on the field, winning just three of their first 10 games. Four wins from their final 13 games followed and the club finished the year in 11th spot, three places higher than in 2018. Following the last game of the season, the club announced that head coach Steve Sheppard would leave the club, after three years in charge of the side.

New recruit Jordan Kenworthy was awarded the club's Player of the Year and Players' Player awards.

== Squad List ==
=== 2019 squad ===
Mackay Cutters
| First team squad | | | Coaching staff |
|---|---|---|---|
| Blake Atherton – CE; Cooper Bambling – HB; Jayden Batchelor – CE; Ross Bella – PR; Sheldon Bobbert – CE; Yamba Bowie – FB, WG; Jarrod Brackenhofer – HB; Jack Brock – PR; Paul Byrnes – WG, FB; Sam Cook – FE; Sala Falelua-Malio – PR | Dane Francis – WG; Tyler Gardiner – HK; Alex Gerrard – PR; Jack Hickson – FE; Jayden Hodges – HK; Kellen Jenner – CE; Marcus Jensen – CE, WG; Sam Johnstone – PR; Jordan Kenworthy – LK; David Munro – LK, PR; Masi Nona – SR | John O'Brien – SR; Jayden O'Shannessy – FB, CE; Augustus Rangihuna – CE, FE; Fetuli Talanoa – WG; Brenden Treston – SR; Lloyd White – HK; Otto Wrakonei – CE | Head coach: Steve Sheppard; Legend: (c) Captain(s); (vc) Vice-captain(s) |

== Squad movement ==
=== Gains ===
| Player | Signed From | Until End of | Notes |
|---|---|---|---|
| Ross Bella | Townsville Blackhawks | 2019 | |
| Jarrod Brackenhofer | Cootamundra Bulldogs | 2019 | |
| Paul Byrnes | Townsville Blackhawks | 2019 | |
| Sam Cook | Warriors (mid-season) | 2019 | |
| Alex Gerrard | Widnes Vikings | 2019 | |
| Sala Falelua-Mailo | Mount Albert Lions | 2019 | |
| Marcus Jensen | Townsville Brothers | 2019 | |
| Sam Johnstone | South Sydney Rabbitohs | 2019 | |
| Jordan Kenworthy | Townsville Blackhawks | 2019 | |
| David Munro | Townsville Blackhawks | 2019 | |
| Augustus Rangihuna | Sunshine Coast Falcons | 2019 | |
| Fetuli Talanoa | Sarina Crocs (mid-season) | 2019 | |
| Lloyd White | Widnes Vikings | 2019 | |
| Otto Wrakonei | Easts Canberra rugby union | 2019 | |

=== Losses ===
| Player | Signed From | Until End of | Notes |
|---|---|---|---|
| Jarrod Brackenhofer | Released (mid-season) | - | |
| Aaron Booth | Easts Tigers | 2019 | |
| Nick Brown | Redcliffe Dolphins | 2019 | |
| Zac Butler | Manly Warringah Sea Eagles | 2019 | |
| Darcy Cox | Redcliffe Dolphins | 2019 | |
| Johnny Faletagoa'i | Taranaki RU | 2019 | |
| Leonati Feiloakitau | Penrith Panthers | 2019 | |
| Jordan Grant | Wests Tigers Mackay | 2019 | |
| Bailey Hartwig | Forbes Magpies | 2019 | |
| Nicho Hynes | Sunshine Coast Falcons | 2019 | |
| Jack Joass | Souths Logan Magpies | 2019 | |
| Bennett Leslie | Easts Tigers | 2019 | |
| Tom Murphy | Stanley River Wolves | 2019 | |
| Jayden O'Shannessy | Released (mid-season) | - | |
| Nathan Saumalu | Sunshine Coast Falcons | 2019 | |

== Fixtures ==
=== Regular season ===
| Date | Round | Opponent | Venue | Score | Tries | Goals |
|---|---|---|---|---|---|---|
| Saturday, 9 March | Round 1 | Easts Tigers | Langlands Park | 12 – 24 | Bambling, Bella | Anderson (1), Bowie (1) |
| Saturday, 15 March | Round 2 | Souths Logan Magpies | BB Print Stadium | 20 – 22 | Bambling, Cotter, Hodges, Pere | Jensen (2) |
| Saturday, 23 March | Round 3 | Central Queensland Capras | BB Print Stadium | 42 – 20 | Kenworthy (2), Bella, Cotter, Hodges, Russell, Wright | Jensen (7) |
| Sunday, 31 March | Round 4 | Wynnum Manly Seagulls | BMD Kougari Oval | 8 – 16 | Bowie, Byrnes | |
| Friday, 5 April | Round 5 | Townsville Blackhawks | Jack Manski Oval | 20 – 6 | Bella, Cotter, Jensen | Jensen (4) |
| Saturday, 13 April | Round 6 | Tweed Heads Seagulls | BB Print Stadium | 12 – 14 | Wright (2) | Anderson (2) |
| Thursday, 18 April | Round 7 | Burleigh Bears | BB Print Stadium | 10 – 24 | Cotter (2) | Anderson (1) |
| Saturday, 27 April | Round 8 | Sunshine Coast Falcons | Sunshine Coast Stadium | 10 – 30 | Bowie, Russell | Anderson (1) |
| Saturday, 4 May | Round 9 | Northern Pride | BB Print Stadium | 22 – 6 | Bowie, Cotter, Hickson, Pere | Anderson (3) |
| Saturday, 18 May | Round 10 | Norths Devils | Bishop Park | 18 – 42 | Anderson, Hodges, Treston | Anderson (3) |
| Saturday, 25 May | Round 11 | Redcliffe Dolphins | BB Print Stadium | 16 – 12 | Batchelor (3) | Anderson (2) |
| Friday, 31 May | Round 12 | Ipswich Jets | BB Print Stadium | 20 – 34 | Bowie (2), Anderson, Cotter | Anderson (2) |
| Sunday, 9 June | Round 13 | PNG Hunters | National Football Stadium | 34 – 26 | Atherton, Batchelor, Gardiner, Hickson, Hodges, Kenworthy | Anderson (5) |
| Saturday, 15 June | Round 14 | Easts Tigers | BB Print Stadium | 10 – 22 | Bowie, Kenworthy | Anderson (1) |
| Sunday, 30 June | Round 15 | Souths Logan Magpies | Davies Park | 26 – 36 | Bowie, Byrnes, Gardiner, Pere, Russell | Anderson (3) |
| Friday, 5 July | Round 16 | Townsville Blackhawks | BB Print Stadium | 6 – 22 | Brock | Anderson (1) |
| Saturday, 13 July | Round 17 | Central Queensland Capras | Marley Brown Oval | 28 – 24 | Anderson (2), Cook, Hodges, White | Anderson (4) |
| Sunday, 21 July | Round 18 | Wynnum Manly Seagulls | Eddie Lee Field | 12 – 34 | Anderson, Cotter | Anderson (2) |
| Sunday, 28 July | Round 19 | Tweed Heads Seagulls | Piggabeen Sports Complex | 30 – 16 | Bobbert, Cotter, Gerrard, Jensen, Kenworthy | Jensen (5) |
| Sunday, 11 August | Round 20 | Sunshine Coast Falcons | BB Print Stadium | 14 – 28 | Anderson, White | Anderson (3) |
| Saturday, 17 August | Round 21 | Norths Devils | BB Print Stadium | 10 – 32 | Bobbert, Brock | Anderson (1) |
| Saturday, 24 August | Round 22 | Ipswich Jets | North Ipswich Reserve | 26 – 28 | Bambling, Bobbert, Brock, Gardiner, Pere | Anderson (3) |
| Saturday, 31 August | Round 23 | Redcliffe Dolphins | Dolphin Stadium | 10 – 48 | Bowie, Russell | Anderson (1) |
Legend: Win Loss Draw Bye

== Statistics ==
| Denotes player contracted to the North Queensland Cowboys for the 2019 season |

| Name | App | T | G | FG | Pts |
|---|---|---|---|---|---|
| Carlin Anderson | 18 | 6 | 39 | - | 102 |
| Blake Atherton | 9 | 1 | - | - | 4 |
| Cooper Bambling | 14 | 3 | - | - | 12 |
| Jayden Batchelor | 8 | 4 | - | - | 16 |
| Logan Bayliss-Brow | 4 | - | - | - | - |
| Ross Bella | 23 | 3 | - | - | 12 |
| Sheldon Bobbert | 4 | 3 | - | - | 12 |
| Yamba Bowie | 23 | 9 | 1 | - | 38 |
| Jack Brock | 14 | 2 | - | - | 8 |
| Paul Byrnes | 23 | 2 | - | - | 8 |
| Sam Cook | 14 | 1 | - | - | 4 |
| Reuben Cotter | 15 | 9 | - | - | -36 |
| Mitchell Dunn | 4 | - | - | - | - |
| Tyler Gardiner | 6 | 3 | - | - | 12 |
| Alex Gerrard | 20 | 1 | - | - | 4 |
| Jack Hickson | 9 | 2 | - | - | 8 |
| Jayden Hodges | 21 | 5 | - | - | 20 |
| Kellen Jenner | 13 | - | - | - | - |
| Marcus Jensen | 10 | 2 | 18 | - | 44 |
| Sam Johnstone | 14 | - | - | - | - |
| Jordan Kenworthy | 23 | 5 | - | - | 20 |
| David Munro | 17 | - | - | - | - |
| Masi Nona | 1 | - | - | - | - |
| John O'Brien | 5 | - | - | - | - |
| Emry Pere | 22 | 4 | - | - | 16 |
| Augustus Rangihuna | 1 | - | - | - | - |
| Daniel Russell | 21 | 4 | - | - | 16 |
| Garrett Smith | 1 | - | - | - | - |
| Fetuli Talanoa | 1 | - | - | - | - |
| Brenden Treston | 13 | 1 | - | - | 4 |
| Lloyd White | 10 | 2 | - | - | 8 |
| Shane Wright | 10 | 3 | - | - | 12 |
| Totals | | 75 | 58 | 0 | 416 |

== Honours ==
=== Club ===
- Player of the Year: Jordan Kenworthy
- Players' Player: Jordan Kenworthy
- Rookie of the Year: Reuben Cotter
- Club Person of the Year: Ronan Curtis
