= 2020 Mackay Cutters season =

Team information
- CEO: Maurie Fatnowna
- Coach: Michael Crawley
- Captain: Jayden Hodges
- Stadium: BB Print Stadium

Top scorers
- Tries: Reuben Cotter (2)
- Goals: Cooper Bambling (2)
- Points: Reuben Cotter (8)
← 2019	2021 →

The 2020 Mackay Cutters season was the 13th in the club's history. Coached by Michael Crawley and captained by Jayden Hodges, they competed in the QRL's Intrust Super Cup. The Cutters played just one game in 2020 after the season was cancelled due to the COVID-19 pandemic.

== Season summary ==
Mackay entered 2020 with a new head coach, former long-time NRL assistant Michael Crawley, and a hosts of new recruits, including former NRL player and Tongan international Mafoa'aeata Hingano. The Cutters lost their opening game of the season, 23–22 to the Norths Devils.

On 17 March, two days after the completion of Round One, the Queensland Rugby League (QRL) announced a 10-week suspension of the competition until 5 June, due to the COVID-19 pandemic. On 27 March, ten days after the suspension, the QRL confirmed the cancellation of the competition for the 2020 season.

== Squad List ==
=== 2020 squad ===
Mackay Cutters 2020 Squad
First team squad			Coaching staff
Jye Andersen – PR; Elijah Anderson – WG, FB; Cooper Bambling – HB; Jayden Batchelor – CE, WG; Ross Bella – PR, LK; Sheldon Bobbert – CE; Yamba Bowie – WG, FB; Jack Brock – PR; Rayden Burns – FB; Paul Byrnes – WG, FB; Malik Cotter – HK	Jesse Dee – PR; Luke Dolbel – CE; Dane Francis – WG, FB; Tyler Gardiner – HK; Bayley Gill – FE; Mafoa'aeata Hingano – FE, HB; Jayden Hodges (c) – HK; Tom Irelandes – FE, CE; Zev John – PR; Sam Johnstone – PR; Kyle Krisanski-Kennedy – FB	Walter Lauenstein – WG; Michael Molo – LK; David Munro – PR, LK; Masi Nona – SR; John O'Brien – SR; Luke Polselli – FB; Augustus Rangihuna – CE, FE; Josh Smith – WG; Josh Tuilagi – WG, CE; Matt Vessey – SR	Head coach: Michael Crawley; Assistant coaches: Brendan Carter (assistant coach); Mick Baker (assistant coach); Tim Rogers (head of performance); Gordon Gu (physiotherapist); Scott Traynor (football manager); Legend: (c) Captain(s); (vc) Vice-captain(s); Updated: 22 January 2020; Source(s): Mackay Cutters

== Squad movement ==
=== Gains ===
Player	Signed from	Until end of	Notes
Elijah Anderson	Central Queensland Capras	2020	
Luke Dolbel	Wyong Roos	2020	
Bayley Gill	Currumbin Eagles	2020	
Mafoa'aeata Hingano	Canberra Raiders	2020	
Zev John	Redcliffe Dolphins	2020	
Michael Molo	Norths Devils	2020	
Luke Polselli	Newtown Jets	2020	
Josh Tuilagi	Cronulla-Sutherland Sharks	2020	

=== Losses ===
Player	Signed from	Until end of	Notes
Sam Cook	Wests Tigers Mackay	2020	
Alex Gerrard	Leigh Centurions	2020	
Jack Hickson	Souths Logan Magpies	2020	
Lloyd White	Toulouse Olympique	2020	
Fetuli Talanoa	Tweed Heads Seagulls	2020	

== Fixtures ==
=== Regular season ===
Date	Round	Opponent	Venue	Score	Tries	Goals
Saturday, 14 March	Round 1	Norths Devils	BB Print Stadium	22 – 23	Cotter (2), Bowie, Polselli	Bambling (2), Bowie (1)
Legend: Win Loss Draw Bye

== Statistics ==
*	Denotes player contracted to the North Queensland Cowboys for the 2020 season

Name	App	T	G	FG	Pts
Elijah Anderson	1	-	-	-	-
Cooper Bambling	1	-	2	-	4
Ross Bella	1	-	-	-	-
Yamba Bowie	1	1	1	-	6
Jack Brock	1	-	-	-	-
Rayden Burns	1	-	-	-	-
Paul Byrnes	1	-	-	-	-
Reuben Cotter*	1	2	-	-	8
Luke Dolbel	1	-	-	-	-
Mafoa'aeata Hingano	1	-	-	-	-
Jayden Hodges	1	-	-	-	-
Michael Molo	1	-	-	-	-
John O'Brien	1	-	-	-	-
Emry Pere*	1	-	-	-	-
Luke Polselli	1	1	-	-	4
Daniel Russell*	1	-	-	-	-
Shane Wright*	1	-	-	-	-
Totals		4	3	0	22
