= 2018 Mackay Cutters season =

- Queensland Cup Rank: 14th
- Play-off result: Missed finals
- 2018 record: Wins: 4; draws: 1; losses: 18
- Points scored: For: 386; against: 688

Team information
- CEO: Troy Rovelli
- Coach: Steve Sheppard
- Captain: Tom Murphy
- Stadium: BB Print Stadium

Top scorers
- Tries: Kurt Wiltshire (8)
- Goals: Nicho Hynes (19)
- Points: Nicho Hynes (58)
← 2017	2019 →

The 2018 Mackay Cutters season was the 11th in the club's history. Coached by Steve Sheppard and captained by Tom Murphy, they competed in the QRL's Intrust Super Cup. The club missed the finals for the fifth consecutive season, finishing last and winning their third wooden spoon.

== Season summary ==
The Cutters entered 2018 with a younger and less experienced side following the departures of co-captains Andrew Davey and Setaimata Sa. New recruits included Wests Tigers NSW Cup duo Jordan Grant and Darcy Cox, Northern Pride forward Jack Brock and former Canberra Raiders U20 back Jack Hickson.

Another poor start to the season followed for the club, as they won just three of their first nine games. Things went from bad to worse after their bye week, as they went on a club record 10-game losing streak. Halfback Cooper Bambling rejoined the club mid-season after joining the Canberra Raiders in the off-season but his return would not help the club's fortunes. The streak ended in Round 21 with a 16-all draw against the Redcliffe Dolphins. The club won just one more game and finished the season in last place.

Jordan Grant won the club's Player of the Year and Players' Player awards in his first season with the Cutters.

== Squad List ==
=== 2018 squad ===
Mackay Cutters
First team squad			Coaching staff
Blake Atherton – CE; Cooper Bambling – HB; Jayden Batchelor – CE; Sheldon Bobbert – CE; Jardine Bobongie – LK; Aaron Booth – HK; Yamba Bowie – FB, WG; Jack Brock – PR; Nick Brown – PR; Zac Butler – HB; Darcy Cox – LK	Jesse Dee – CE; Johnny Faletagoa'i – WG; Leonati Feiloakitau – PR; Dane Francis – WG; Tyler Gardiner – HK; Jordan Grant – PR; Bailey Hartwig – FE; Jack Hickson – FE; Jayden Hodges – HK; Nicho Hynes – FE, FB; Kellen Jenner – CE	Jack Joass – FB, WG; Lona Kaifoto – SR; Ryan Kinlyside – PR; Bennett Leslie – SR; Jared Maguire – WG; Tyson Martin – SR; Tom Murphy (c) – SR; John O'Brien – SR; Nathan Saumalu – CE; Brenden Treston – SR	Head coach: Steve Sheppard; Legend: (c) Captain(s); (vc) Vice-captain(s)

== Squad movement ==
=== Gains ===
Player	Signed From	Until end of	Notes
Cooper Bambling	Canberra Raiders (mid-season)	2018	
Jack Brock	Northern Pride	2018	
Zac Butler	Western Mustangs	2018	
Darcy Cox	Wests Tigers	2018	
Jesse Dee	Illawarra Cutters	2018	
Dane Francis	St George Illawarra Dragons	2018	
Jordan Grant	Wests Tigers	2018	
Bailey Hartwig	Norths Devils	2018	
Jack Hickson	Woden Valley Rams	2018	

=== Losses ===
Player	Signed From	Until end of	Notes
Cooper Bambling	Canberra Raiders	2018	
Jack Blagbrough	Leigh Centurions	2018	
Andrew Davey	Townsville Blackhawks	2018	
Jake Eden	Released	–	
Gareth Moore	Released	–	
Jacob Pottinger	Released	–	
Isaac Richardson	Released	–	
Setaimata Sa	Wests Tigers Mackay	2018	
Kouma Samson	Mount Albert Lions	2018	
Semisi Tyrell	Mount Albert Lions	2018	

== Fixtures ==
=== Regular season ===
Date	Round	Opponent	Venue	Score	Tries	Goals
Saturday, 10 March	Round 1	Townsville Blackhawks	BB Print Stadium	12 – 56	Atherton, Joass	Hynes (2)
Sunday, 18 March	Round 2	Easts Tigers	Suzuki Stadium	24 – 26	Dunn, Faletagoa'i, Laybutt, Saumalu, Wiltshire	Laybutt (2)
Saturday, 24 March	Round 3	Central Queensland Capras	BB Print Stadium	18 – 16	Hodges, Laybutt, Wiltshire	Laybutt (3)
Saturday, 31 March	Round 4	Northern Pride	Barlow Park	16 – 22	Bowie (2), Coote, Hodges	
Saturday, 7 April	Round 5	Sunshine Coast Falcons	BB Print Stadium	4 – 32	Atherton	
Saturday, 14 April	Round 6	Ipswich Jets	North Ipswich Reserve	28 – 18	Faletagoa'i (2), Bobongie, Leslie, Wiltshire	Bowie (4)
Saturday, 21 April	Round 7	Redcliffe Dolphins	BB Print Stadium	10 – 38	Bowie, Saumalu	Bowie (1)
Saturday, 28 April	Round 8	Tweed Heads Seagulls	BB Print Stadium	24 – 52	Dunn, Hodges, Saumalu, Wiltshire	Bowie (4)
Saturday, 5 May	Round 9	Norths Devils	Bishop Park	26 – 10	Bobbert, Brown, Cox, Hodges, Hynes	Hynes (3)
	Round 10	Bye				
Sunday, 20 May	Round 11	Souths Logan Magpies	Davies Park	30 – 42	Bowie, Coote, Faletagoa'i, Hynes, Murphy, Wiltshire	Hynes (3)
Saturday, 26 May	Round 12	Burleigh Bears	Pizzey Park	10 – 20	Bambling, Brown	Hynes (1)
Saturday, 2 June	Round 13	Wynnum Manly Seagulls	BB Print Stadium	20 – 34	Atherton, Faletagoa'i, Hynes, Wiltshire	Hynes (2)
Sunday, 10 June	Round 14	PNG Hunters	National Football Stadium	12 – 26	Bambling, Hodges	Joass (2)
Saturday, 16 June	Round 15	Townsville Blackhawks	Jack Manski Oval	22 – 28	Atherton, Faletagoa'i, Grant, Joass	Joass (3)
Saturday, 30 June	Round 16	Central Queensland Capras	Browne Park	6 – 20	Laybutt	Joass (1)
Friday, 6 July	Round 17	Ipswich Jets	BB Print Stadium	0 – 54		
Saturday, 14 July	Round 18	Easts Tigers	BB Print Stadium	10 – 44	Hynes, Leslie	Hynes (1)
Saturday, 21 July	Round 19	Sunshine Coast Falcons	Denison Park	18 – 40	Atherton, Brown, Saumalu	Hynes (3)
Sunday, 29 July	Round 20	Tweed Heads Seagulls	Piggabeen Sports Complex	22 – 24	Atherton, Bowie, Hynes, Saumalu, Treston	Hynes (1)
Saturday, 4 August	Round 21	Redcliffe Dolphins	Dolphin Stadium	16 – 16	Leslie (2), Grant	Hynes (2)
Saturday, 11 August	Round 22	Northern Pride	BB Print Stadium	12 – 24	Bowie, Wright	Laybutt (2)
Saturday, 18 August	Round 23	Norths Devils	BB Print Stadium	32 – 24	Bambling, Batchelor, Grant, Laybutt, Leslie, Wiltshire	Laybutt (4)
Saturday, 25 August	Round 24	Souths Logan Magpies	BB Print Stadium	14 – 22	Bowie, O'Brien, Wiltshire	Hynes (1)
Legend: Win Loss Draw Bye

== Statistics ==
Denotes player contracted to the North Queensland Cowboys for the 2018 season

Name	App	T	G	FG	Pts
Jye Andersen	7	-	-	-	-
Blake Atherton	18	6	-	-	24
Cooper Bambling	14	3	-	-	12
Jayden Batchelor	2	1	-	-	4
Sheldon Bobbert	7	1	-	-	4
Jardine Bobongie	6	1	-	-	4
Yamba Bowie	23	7	9	-	46
Jack Brock	5	-	-	-	-
Nick Brown	22	3	-	-	12
Zac Butler	1	-	-	-	-
Josh Chudleigh	3	-	-	-	-
Lachlan Coote	8	2	-	-	8
Darcy Cox	8	1	-	-	4
Jesse Dee	3	-	-	-	-
Mitchell Dunn	17	2	-	-	8
Johnny Faletagoa'i	21	6	-	-	24
Leonati Feiloakitau	2	-	-	-	-
Dane Francis	1	-	-	-	-
Jordan Grant	23	3	-	-	12
Bailey Hartwig	1	-	-	-	-
Jack Hickson	7	-	-	-	-
Sam Hoare	11	-	-	-	-
Jayden Hodges	21	5	-	-	20
Nicho Hynes	21	5	19	-	58
Kellen Jenner	9	-	-	-	-
Jack Joass	5	2	6	-	20
Lona Kaifoto	14	1-	-	-	-
Kyle Laybutt	14	4	11	-	38
Bennett Leslie	19	5	-	-	20
Jared Maguire	1	-	-	-	-
Tyson Martin	2	-	-	-	-
Sam Murphy	3	-	-	-	-
Tom Murphy	13	1	-	-	4
John O'Brien	2	1	-	-	4
Nathan Saumalu	21	5	-	-	20
Brenden Treston	13	1	-	-	4
Kurt Wiltshire	13	8	-	-	32
Shane Wright	10	1	-	-	4
Totals		74	45	0	386

== Honours ==
=== Club ===
- Player of the Year: Jordan Grant
- Players' Player: Jordan Grant
- Rookie of the Year: Jye Andersen
- Club Person of the Year: Danell Curtis
