= 2017 Mackay Cutters season =

- Queensland Cup Rank: 8th
- Play-off result: Missed finals
- 2017 record: Wins: 10; draws: 2; losses: 11
- Points scored: For: 531; against: 566

Team information
- CEO: Troy Rovelli
- Coach: Steve Sheppard
- Captain: Andrew Davey Setaimata Sa
- Stadium: BB Print Stadium

Top scorers
- Tries: Yamba Bowie (14)
- Goals: Jack Joass (33)
- Points: Nicho Hynes; Jack Joass (86)
← 2016	2018 →

The 2017 Mackay Cutters season was the tenth in the club's history. Coached by Steve Sheppard and captained by Andrew Davey and Setaimata Sa, they competed in the QRL's Intrust Super Cup. The club missed the finals for the fourth consecutive season, finishing eighth.

== Season summary ==
Following an unsuccessful season in 2016, the Cutters underwent a major roster overhaul, led by new head coach Steve Sheppard. The club's key signings included former Samoa and New Zealand international Setaimata Sa and former NRL player Jayden Hodges. Sa was awarded the co-captaincy of the team, alongside second-rower Andrew Davey. Hodges' first season with Mackay was short lived after he tore his ACL in the team's first trial in February, ruling him out for the season.

The Cutters did not find much success in the first half of the season, winning just four of their first 12 games. Six wins and two draws from their final 11 games saw them fight for a spot in finals, but they finished short - just four points outside of the Top 6, in eighth spot. Co-captain Andrew Davey was named the club's Player of the Year at the end of the season. In 2017, the Cutters used just two North Queensland Cowboys-contracted players, the least in club history.

== Squad List ==
=== 2017 squad ===
Mackay Cutters
First team squad			Coaching staff
Blake Atherton – CE; Cooper Bambling – FE; Jayden Batchelor – CE; Jack Blagbrough – PR; Aaron Booth – HK; Yamba Bowie – FB, WG; Daniel Boyd – FE; Nick Brown – PR; Andrew Davey (c) – SR; Jake Eden – SR; Johnny Faletagoa'i – WG	Alex Farrell – SR; Leonati Feiloakitau – PR; Tyler Gardiner – HK; Jayden Hodges – HK; Nicho Hynes – FE, FB; Kellen Jenner – CE; Jack Joass – FB, WG; Lona Kaifoto – SR; Yosepha Kepa – FE; Bennett Leslie – SR; Tyson Martin – SR	Gareth Moore – PR; Tom Murphy – SR; Jordan Pereira – WG; Jacob Pottinger – HK; Isaac Richardson – PR; Setaimata Sa (c) – SR; Kouma Samson – SR; Nathan Saumalu – CE; Eliki Taufahema – HK; Semisi Tyrell – CE	Head coach: Steve Sheppard; Legend: (c) Captain(s); (vc) Vice-captain(s)

== Squad movement ==
=== Gains ===
Player	Signed From	Until End of	Notes
Cooper Bambling	North Queensland Cowboys	2017	
Yamba Bowie	Cairns Brothers	2017	
Nick Brown	North Queensland Cowboys	2017	
Jake Eden	Souths Logan Magpies	2017	
Jayden Hodges	Manly Warringah Sea Eagles	2017	
Nicho Hynes	Manly Warringah Sea Eagles	2017	
Jack Joass	Souths Logan Magpies	2017	
Lona Kaifoto	Townsville Blackhawks	2017	
Tom Murphy	Sunshine Coast Falcons	2017	
Setaimata Sa	Widnes Vikings	2017	
Kouma Samson	Glenora Bears	2017	
Nathan Saumalu	Canterbury Bulls	2017	
Semisi Tyrell	Warriors	2017	

=== Losses ===
Player	Signed From	Until End of	Notes
Delayne Ashby	Illawarra Cutters	2017	
Joss Boyton	Released	–	
Jack Creith	Easts Tigers	2017	
Andrew Gay	West Wales Raiders	2017	
Ryan Kinlyside	Released	–	
Nicholas Mataia	Released	–	
Kelvin Nielsen	Released	–	
John Papalii	Released	–	
Michael Pearsall	Norths Devils	2017	
Jordan Pereira	St George Illawarra (mid-season)	2017	
Steve Rapira	Released	–	
Tone Susuga	Released	–	
Liam Taylor	Released	–	
Regan Verney	Ivanhoes Knights	2017	

== Fixtures ==
=== Regular season ===
Date	Round	Opponent	Venue	Score	Tries	Goals
Saturday, 4 March	Round 1	Northern Pride	BB Print Stadium	4 – 24	Saumaulu	
Saturday, 11 March	Round 2	Tweed Heads Seagulls	BB Print Stadium	38 – 6	Bowie (2), Bambling, Booth, Pereira, Saumalu, Uele	Hynes (5)
Saturday, 18 March	Round 3	Townsville Blackhawks	Jack Manski Oval	12 – 60	Pereira, Uele	Hynes (2)
Saturday, 25 March	Round 4	Wynnum Manly Seagulls	BMD Kougari Oval	22 – 18	Uele (2), Bowie, Pereira	Hynes (3)
Saturday, 1 April	Round 5	PNG Hunters	BB Print Stadium	16 – 36	Faletagoa'i, Hynes, Pereira	Hynes (2)
Saturday, 8 April	Round 6	Central Queensland Capras	Browne Park	38 – 22	Saumalu (3), Davey (2), Faletagoa'i, Sa, Uele	Hynes (3)
Sunday, 16 April	Round 7	Souths Logan Magpies	Davies Park	24 – 42	Joass (2), Bambling, Saumalu, Uele	Hynes (2)
Saturday, 22 April	Round 8	Easts Tigers	BB Print Stadium	33 – 10	Bambling, Bowie, Davey, Sa, Saumalu, Uele	Bambling (4, 1 FG)
Sunday, 30 April	Round 9	Norths Devils	BB Print Stadium	10 – 34	Bambling, Saumalu	Bambling (1)
Saturday, 13 May	Round 10	Redcliffe Dolphins	Dolphin Oval	6 – 14	Pereira	Bambling (1)
Saturday, 20 May	Round 11	Sunshine Coast Falcons	Sunshine Coast Stadium	18 – 28	Bowie, Hynes, Tyrell	Hynes (3)
Saturday, 27 May	Round 12	Burleigh Bears	BB Print Stadium	28 – 34	Saumalu (2), Booth, Davey, Hynes	Booth (4)
Saturday, 3 June	Round 13	Wynnum Manly Seagulls	BB Print Stadium	20 – 14	Bowie (2), Hynes, Uele	Hynes (2)
Saturday, 10 June	Round 14	Townsville Blackhawks	BB Print Stadium	20 – 20	Bambling, Bowie, Faletagoa'i, Pereira	Hynes (2)
	Round 15	Bye				
Sunday, 25 June	Round 16	Norths Devils	Bishop Park	52 – 4	Bambling (2), Faletagoa'i (2), Hynes (2), Pereira (2), Joass, Uele	Joass (4), Bambling (1), Hynes (1)
Sunday, 2 July	Round 17	Northern Pride	Barlow Park	26 – 18	Bowie (2), Bambling, Booth	Joass (5)
Saturday, 8 July	Round 18	Easts Tigers	Suzuki Stadium	10 – 34	Hynes, Kaifoto	Joass (1)
Saturday, 15 July	Round 19	Central Queensland Capras	BB Print Stadium	38 – 20	Joass (2), Booth, Davey, Faletagoa'i, Saumalu, Uele	Joass (5)
Saturday, 22 July	Round 20	PNG Hunters	National Football Stadium	22 – 22	Bowie (2), Faletagoa'i, Wright	Joass (3)
	Round 21	Bye				
Saturday, 5 August	Round 22	Sunshine Coast Falcons	BB Print Stadium	30 – 26	Bambling, Bowie, Brown, Davey, Saumalu	Joass (5)
Saturday, 12 August	Round 23	Burleigh Bears	Pizzey Park	16 – 28	Uele, Leslie	Joass (2)
Saturday, 19 August	Round 24	Ipswich Jets	North Ipswich Reserve	30 – 20	Bowie, Davey, Hynes, Leslie, Samson	Joass (5)
Saturday, 26 August	Round 25	Souths Logan Magpies	BB Print Stadium	18 – 32	Boyd, Hynes, Saumalu	Joass (3)
Legend: Win Loss Draw Bye

== Statistics ==
Denotes player contracted to the North Queensland Cowboys for the 2017 season

Name	App	T	G	FG	Pts
Blake Atherton	3	-	-	-	-
Cooper Bambling	23	9	7	1	51
Jayden Batchelor	1	-	-	-	-
Jack Blagbrough	12	-	-	-	-
Aaron Booth	22	4	4	-	24
Yamba Bowie	23	14	-	-	56
Daniel Boyd	1	1	-	-	4
Nick Brown	23	1	-	-	4
Andrew Davey	21	7	-	-	28
Jake Eden	9	-	-	-	-
Johnny Faletagoa'i	18	7	-	-	28
Alex Farrell	2	-	-	-	-
Leonati Feiloakitau	7	-	-	-	-
Tyler Gardiner	1	-	-	-	-
Nicho Hynes	21	9	25	-	86
Kellen Jenner	5	-	-	-	-
Jack Joass	22	5	33	-	86
Lona Kaifoto	18	1	-	-	4
Yosepha Kepa	1	-	-	-	-
Bennett Leslie	10	2	-	-	8
Gareth Moore	9	-	-	-	-
Tom Murphy	11	-	-	-	-
Jordan Pereira	15	8	-	-	32
Jacob Pottinger	10	-	-	-	-
Isaac Richardson	9	-	-	-	-
Setaimata Sa	20	2	-	-	8
Kouma Samson	17	1	-	-	4
Nathan Saumalu	17	13	-	-	52
Eliki Taufahema	1	-	-	-	-
Semisi Tyrell	6	1	-	-	4
Braden Uele	21	12	-	-	48
Shane Wright	12	1	-	-	4
Totals		98	69	1	531

== Honours ==
=== Club ===
- Player of the Year: Andrew Davey
- Players' Player: Nick Brown
- Rookie of the Year: Cooper Bambling
- Club Person of the Year: Jodie Grosskreutz
