= 2019 North Queensland Cowboys season =

Coordinates: 27°27′53″S 153°0′34″E

- NRL Rank: 14th
- Play-off result: Missed finals
- 2019 record: Wins: 9; draws: 0; losses: 15
- Points scored: For: 378; against: 500

Team information
- CEO: Jeff Reibel
- Coach: Paul Green
- Captain: Michael Morgan
- Stadium: 1300SMILES Stadium
- Avg. attendance: 13,658
- High attendance: 18,415 (vs. St George Illawarra, Round 1)

Top scorers
- Tries: Kyle Feldt (11)
- Goals: Jordan Kahu (40)
- Points: Jordan Kahu (86)
← 2018	2020 →

The 2019 North Queensland Cowboys season was the 25th in the club's history. Coached by Paul Green and captained by Michael Morgan, they competed in the NRL's 2019 Telstra Premiership. Their first season since 2004 without club legend Johnathan Thurston, who retired at the end of 2018, the side finished 14th and missed the finals for the second straight year.

== Season summary ==
=== Milestones ===
- Round 1: Jordan Kahu, Nene Macdonald, Josh McGuire and Tom Opacic made their debuts for the club.
- Round 1: Nene Macdonald scored his first try for the club.
- Round 2: Jordan Kahu scored his first try for the club.
- Round 4: The club played their 600th game.
- Round 4: Ben Hampton played his 50th game for the club.
- Round 4: Jordan McLean played his 100th NRL game.
- Round 5: Jordan Kahu played his 100th NRL game.
- Round 5: Kurt Baptiste made his debut for the club.
- Round 6: Josh McGuire played his 200th NRL game.
- Round 7: John Asiata played his 100th game for the club.
- Round 9: Tom Opacic scored his first try for the club.
- Round 10: Michael Morgan played his 150th game for the club.
- Round 10: Kyle Feldt played his 100th game for the club.
- Round 11: Justin O'Neill played his 100th game for the club.
- Round 13: Reuben Cotter made his NRL debut.
- Round 13: Francis Molo scored his first try in the NRL.
- Round 15: Scott Drinkwater made his debut for the club.
- Round 15: Scott Drinkwater scored his first try for the club.
- Round 17: Gavin Cooper played his 300th NRL game.
- Round 17: Jake Clifford scored his first try for the club.
- Round 18: Murray Taulagi made his NRL debut.
- Round 18: Paul Green coached his 150th NRL game.
- Round 21: Peter Hola made his NRL debut.
- Round 21: Shane Wright scored his first try in the NRL.
- Round 23: Murray Taulagi scored his first try in the NRL.
- Round 24: Shane Wright scored the final try at 1300SMILES Stadium.

=== Squad ===
North Queensland Cowboys NRL Squad 2019
First team squad			Coaching staff
Carlin Anderson – FB, WG; John Asiata – PR, LK; Kurt Baptiste – HK; Logan Bayliss-Brow – PR; Scott Bolton – PR; Javid Bowen – CE, WG; Jake Clifford – HB; Gavin Cooper – SR; Reuben Cotter – HK; Scott Drinkwater – FB; Mitchell Dunn – SR, FE; Kyle Feldt – WG	Gideon Gela-Mosby – WG; Tom Gilbert – LK; Jake Granville – HK; Ben Hampton – CE, FB; Coen Hess – SR; Peter Hola – LK; Corey Jensen – PR; Jordan Kahu – WG, CE, FB; Te Maire Martin – FE; Josh McGuire – PR; Jordan McLean (vc) – PR; Francis Molo – PR	Michael Morgan (c) – HB, FE; Justin O'Neill – CE; Tom Opacic – CE; Emry Pere – PR; Dan Russell – WG, CE; Matthew Scott – PR; Jason Taumalolo – LK; Murray Taulagi – WG; Enari Tuala – CE; Kurt Wiltshire – CE; Shane Wright – SR	Head coach: Paul Green; Assistant coaches: David Fairleigh (assistant coach); Josh Hannay (assistant coach); David Tangata-Toa (assistant coach); Paul Bowman (Head of Sports Science); Michael Dobbin (head of performance); Mark Henry (assistant strength & conditioning coach); Ashley Graham (elite pathways performance coach); Steve Sartori (physiotherapist); Legend: (c) Captain(s); (vc) Vice-captain(s); Updated: 26 February 2019; Source(s): NQ Cowboys

== Squad movement ==
=== Gains ===
Player	Signed From	Until end of	Notes
Kurt Baptiste	Sydney Roosters	2019	
Ben Barba	St. Helens	2019	
Scott Drinkwater	Melbourne Storm (mid-season)	2021	
Jordan Kahu	Brisbane Broncos	2019	
Nene Macdonald	St George Illawarra Dragons	2021	
Josh McGuire	Brisbane Broncos	2022	
Tom Opacic	Brisbane Broncos	2020	
Dan Russell	Souths Logan Magpies	2020	

=== Losses ===
Player	Signed To	Until end of	Notes
Ben Barba	Released (pre-season)	-	
Josh Chudleigh	Townsville Blackhawks	2019	
Lachlan Coote	St. Helens	2021	
Shaun Fensom	Brisbane Broncos	2019	
Sam Hoare	Townsville Blackhawks	2019	
Shaun Hudson	Townsville Blackhawks	2019	
Kyle Laybutt	Townsville Blackhawks	2019	
Kane Linnett	Hull Kingston Rovers	2021	
Ethan Lowe	South Sydney Rabbitohs	2019	
Nene Macdonald	Released (mid-season)	-	
Johnathan Thurston	Retired	-	
Antonio Winterstein	Retired	-	

=== Re-signings ===
Player	Club	Until end of	Notes
Jake Clifford	North Queensland Cowboys	2021	
Gavin Cooper	North Queensland Cowboys	2020	
Reuben Cotter	North Queensland Cowboys	2020	
Mitchell Dunn	North Queensland Cowboys	2020	
Tom Gilbert	North Queensland Cowboys	2022	
Ben Hampton	North Queensland Cowboys	2021	
Peter Hola	North Queensland Cowboys	2022	
Corey Jensen	North Queensland Cowboys	2021	
Murray Taulagi	North Queensland Cowboys	2021	

== Ladder ==
2019 NRL season
Pos	Team	Pld	W	D	L	B	PF	PA	PD	Pts
1	Melbourne Storm	24	20	0	4	1	631	300	+331	42
2	Sydney Roosters	24	17	0	7	1	627	363	+264	36
3	South Sydney Rabbitohs	24	16	0	8	1	521	417	+104	34
4	Canberra Raiders	24	15	0	9	1	524	374	+150	32
5	Parramatta Eels	24	14	0	10	1	533	473	+60	30
6	Manly-Warringah Sea Eagles	24	14	0	10	1	496	446	+50	30
7	Cronulla-Sutherland Sharks	24	12	0	12	1	514	464	+50	26
8	Brisbane Broncos	24	11	1	12	1	432	489	−57	25
9	Wests Tigers	24	11	0	13	1	475	486	−11	24
10	Penrith Panthers	24	11	0	13	1	413	474	−61	24
11	Newcastle Knights	24	10	0	14	1	485	522	−37	22
12	Canterbury-Bankstown Bulldogs	24	10	0	14	1	326	477	−151	22
13	New Zealand Warriors	24	9	1	14	1	433	574	−141	21
14	North Queensland Cowboys	24	9	0	15	1	378	500	−122	20
15	St. George Illawarra Dragons	24	8	0	16	1	427	575	−148	18
16	Gold Coast Titans	24	4	0	20	1	370	651	−281	10

== Fixtures ==
=== Pre-season ===
Date	Round	Opponent	Venue	Score	Tries	Goals	Attendance
Saturday, 23 February	Trial 1	Gold Coast Titans	Sunshine Coast Stadium	22 – 16	Clifford (3), Martin	Clifford (3/4)	10,680
Saturday, 2 March	Trial 2	Melbourne Storm	BB Print Stadium	14 – 6	Cooper, Hampton, O'Neill	Kahu (1/3)	10,000
Legend: Win Loss Draw Bye

=== Regular season ===
Date	Round	Opponent	Venue	Score	Tries	Goals	Attendance
Saturday, 16 March	Round 1	St George Illawarra Dragons	1300SMILES Stadium	24 – 12	Bowen, Macdonald, Martin, Morgan, O'Neill	Kahu (2/4), Martin (0/1)	18,415
Friday, 22 March	Round 2	Brisbane Broncos	Suncorp Stadium	10 – 29	Kahu, O'Neill	Kahu (1/2)	45,023
Saturday, 30 March	Round 3	Cronulla Sharks	1300SMILES Stadium	16 –42	Cooper, Martin, McLean	Kahu (2/3)	11,610
Saturday, 6 April	Round 4	Canberra Raiders	1300SMILES Stadium	12 – 30	Asiata, Cooper	Kahu (2/2)	11,750
Friday, 12 April	Round 5	Melbourne Storm	1300SMILES Stadium	12 – 18	Hampton, Martin	Kahu (2/3)	14,130
Saturday, 20 April	Round 6	Warriors	Mt Smart Stadium	17 – 10	Hess, O'Neill	Kahu (4/4), Morgan (1 FG)	11,395
Friday, 26 April	Round 7	Canterbury Bulldogs	ANZ Stadium	12 – 24	Hampton, O'Neill	Kahu (2/3)	6,711
Friday, 3 May	Round 8	Gold Coast Titans	1300SMILES Stadium	28 – 14	Asiata, Granville, O'Neill, Taumalolo	Kahu (6/6)	10,655
Sunday, 12 May	Round 9	South Sydney Rabbitohs	Suncorp Stadium	16 – 32	O'Neill (2), Opacic	Kahu (2/3)	34,564
Saturday, 18 May	Round 10	Parramatta Eels	1300SMILES Stadium	17 – 10	Feldt, Opacic, Scott	Kahu (2/4, 1 FG)	12,493
Saturday, 25 May	Round 11	Canberra Raiders	GIO Stadium	22 – 16	Feldt, O'Neill, Opacic	Kahu (5/6)	14,647
Sunday, 2 June	Round 12	Gold Coast Titans	Cbus Super Stadium	6 – 4	Taumalolo	Kahu (1/1)	11,226
Saturday, 8 June	Round 13	Manly Sea Eagles	1300SMILES Stadium	20 – 22	Feldt, Molo, Opacic	Clifford (4/4)	13,314
Friday, 14 June	Round 14	Wests Tigers	1300SMILES Stadium	26 – 27	Feldt (2), Bowen, Morgan	Clifford (5/6)	11,692
Friday, 28 June	Round 15	St George Illawarra Dragons	WIN Stadium	14 – 22	Opacic (2), Drinkwater	Kahu (1/3), Clifford (0/1)	7,008
	Round 16	Bye					
Sunday, 14 July	Round 17	Sydney Roosters	Central Coast Stadium	15 – 12	Asiata, Clifford	Clifford (2/2, 1 FG), Kahu (1/2)	14,668
Saturday, 20 July	Round 18	South Sydney Rabbitohs	1300SMILES Stadium	18 – 30	Drinkwater, Feldt, Opacic	Clifford (3/6)	16,638
Thursday, 25 July	Round 19	Cronulla Sharks	Southern Cross Group Stadium	14 – 16	Drinkwater, Molo, Scott	Clifford (1/3)	6,144
Thursday, 1 August	Round 20	Wests Tigers	Leichhardt Oval	4 – 24	Feldt	Clifford (0/1)	10,016
Thursday, 8 August	Round 21	Brisbane Broncos	1300SMILES Stadium	14 – 18	Clifford, Wright	Clifford (3/3)	17,530
Saturday, 17 August	Round 22	Newcastle Knights	McDonald Jones Stadium	6 – 42	Clifford	Kahu (1/1)	16,752
Friday, 23 August	Round 23	Penrith Panthers	1300SMILES Stadium	24 – 10	Feldt (2), Taulagi, Taumalolo	Kahu (4/4)	10,523
Thursday, 29 August	Round 24	Canterbury Bulldogs	1300SMILES Stadium	15 – 8	Feldt, Wright	Kahu (2/2, 1 FG), Bolton (1/1)	15,141
Friday, 6 September	Round 25	Melbourne Storm	AAMI Park	16 – 24	Cooper, Feldt, Taulagi	Feldt (2/2), Kahu (0/1)	12,085
Legend: Win Loss Draw Bye

== Statistics ==
Name	App	T	G	FG	Pts
John Asiata	24	3	-	-	12
Kurt Baptiste	9	-	-	-	-
Scott Bolton	18	-	1	-	2
Javid Bowen	7	2	-	-	8
Jake Clifford	15	3	18	1	49
Gavin Cooper	24	3	-	-	12
Reuben Cotter	5	-	-	-	-
Scott Drinkwater	10	3	-	-	12
Mitchell Dunn	9	-	-	-	-
Kyle Feldt	16	11	2	-	48
Gideon Gela-Mosby	3	-	-	-	-
Jake Granville	24	1	-	-	4
Ben Hampton	8	2	-	-	8
Coen Hess	22	1	-	-	4
Peter Hola	5	-	-	-	-
Corey Jensen	6	-	-	-	-
Jordan Kahu	19	1	40	2	86
Nene Macdonald	5	1	-	-	4
Te Maire Martin	7	3	-	-	12
Josh McGuire	17	-	-	-	-
Jordan McLean	22	1	-	-	4
Francis Molo	24	2	-	-	8
Michael Morgan	20	2	-	1	9
Justin O'Neill	8	8	-	-	32
Tom Opacic	19	7	-	-	28
Matthew Scott	17	2	-	-	8
Murray Taulagi	6	2	-	-	8
Jason Taumalolo	18	3	-	-	12
Enari Tuala	7	-	-	-	-
Shane Wright	14	2	-	-	8
Totals		63	61	4	378

== Representatives ==
The following players have played a representative match in 2019.

	Residents match	State of Origin 1	State of Origin 2	State of Origin 3	Prime Minister's XIII	Oceanic Cup
John Asiata	–	–	–	–	–	Tonga
Kurt Baptiste	–	–	–	–	–	Papua New Guinea
Tom Gilbert	Queensland	–	–	–	–	–
Kyle Feldt	Queensland	–	–	–	Prime Minister's XIII	–
Corey Jensen	Queensland	–	–	–	–	–
Josh McGuire	–	Queensland	Queensland	Queensland	–	–
Michael Morgan	–	Queensland	Queensland	Queensland	–	–
Daniel Russell	–	–	–	–	–	Papua New Guinea
Jason Taumalolo	–	–	–	–	–	Tonga

== Honours ==
=== Club ===
- Paul Bowman Medal: Jason Taumalolo
- Players' Player: Jordan McLean
- Coach's Award: Francis Molo
- Member's Player of the Year: Jason Taumalolo
- Club Person of the Year: Ben Hampton
- Rookie of the Year: Shane Wright
- Townsville Bulletin Fan's Choice Award: Kyle Feldt

== Feeder Clubs ==
=== Queensland Cup ===
- Mackay Cutters - 11th, missed finals
- Northern Pride - 12th, missed finals
- Townsville Blackhawks - 4th, lost preliminary final
