= Sam Cook (rugby league) =

New Zealand rugby league footballer

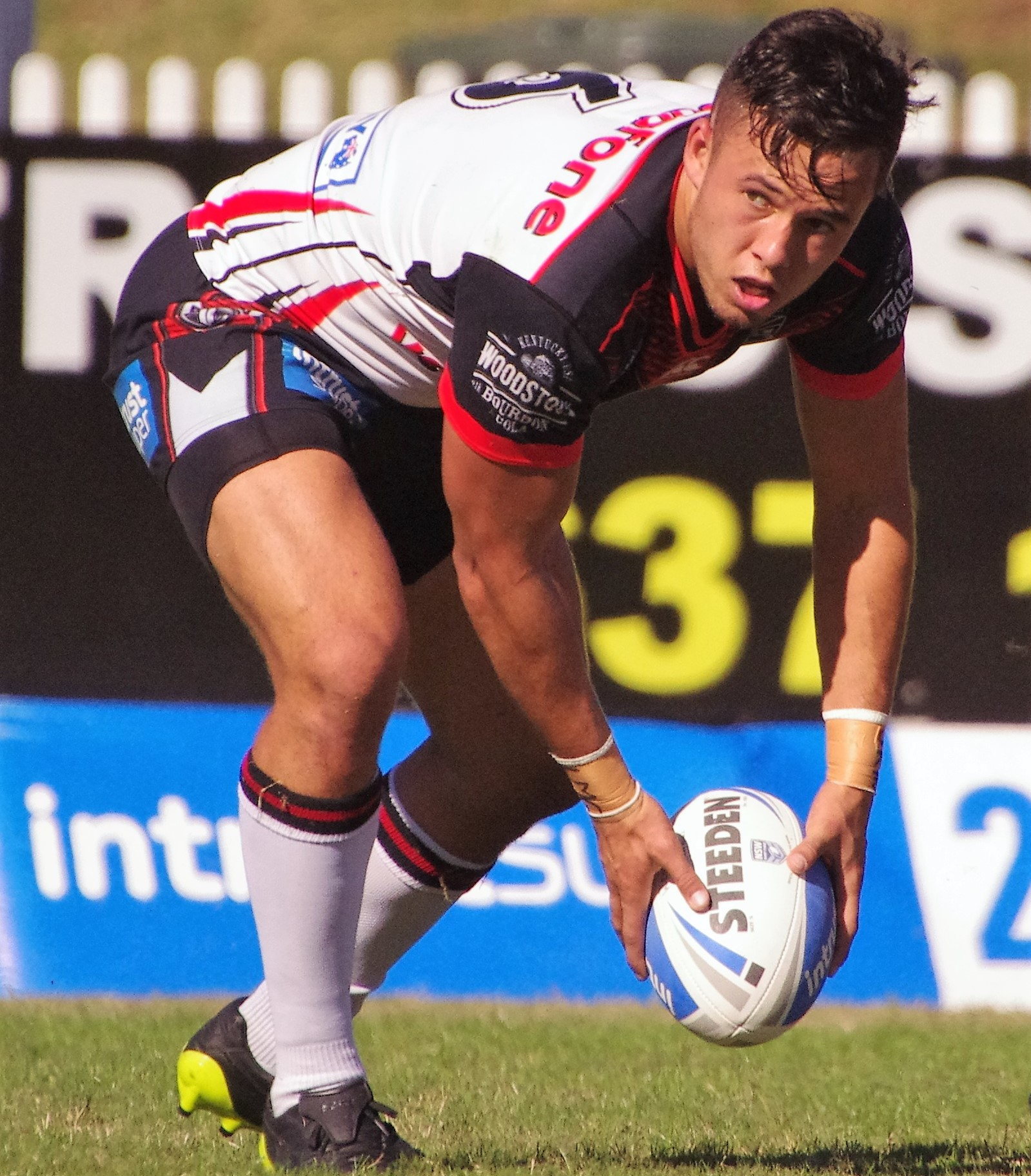

Personal information
- Born: 1 August 1993 (age 33) Auckland, New Zealand
- Height: 5 ft 11 in (1.80 m)
- Weight: 14 st 7 lb (92 kg)

Playing information
- Position: Hooker
Club
Years	Team	Pld	T	G	FG	P
2018–19	New Zealand Warriors	2	0	0	0	0
2022–24	Albi	18	3	0	0	6
2024–25	York Knights	34	11	0	0	44
2026–	Newcastle Thunder	9	2	0	0	8
2026	→ York Knights (loan)	7	0	0	0	0
	Total	70	16	0	0	58
- Source: As of 19 November 2026

Sam Cook (born 1 August 1993) is a New Zealand professional rugby league footballer who plays as a hooker for the York Knights in the Super League, on loan from the Newcastle Thunder in the Championship.

He previously played for the New Zealand Warriors in the NRL, Albi in Elite One Championship and York Knights in the Championship.

== Background ==
Born in Auckland, New Zealand, Cook is of Māori descent. Cook played his junior rugby league for the Northcote Tigers before being signed the New Zealand Warriors. Cook played in the Warriors NYC team in 2013. In 2017, Cook was selected in the Warriors 2017 NRL Auckland Nines squad.

== Playing career ==
=== 2018 & 2019 ===
After showing good form in the trial matches, Cook had beaten the likes of Jazz Tevaga for the utility bench role for Round 1. In Round 1 of the 2018 NRL season, Cook made his NRL debut for the New Zealand Warriors against the South Sydney Rabbitohs, playing off the interchange bench in the 32–20 win at Perth Stadium. In 2019, Cook joined Queensland Cup side Mackay.

=== 2024 ===
In June 2024 Cook signed for York Knights in the RFL Championship in a deal lasting until the end of the 2025 season. He made his debut for the club against Dewsbury Rams on 16 June and made 7 appearances for York in the 2024 season, scoring 5 tries.

=== 2026 ===
On 20 March 2026 it was reported that he had signed for York Knights in the Super League on loan
