= Daniel Russell (rugby league) =

PNG international rugby league footballer

Dan Russell
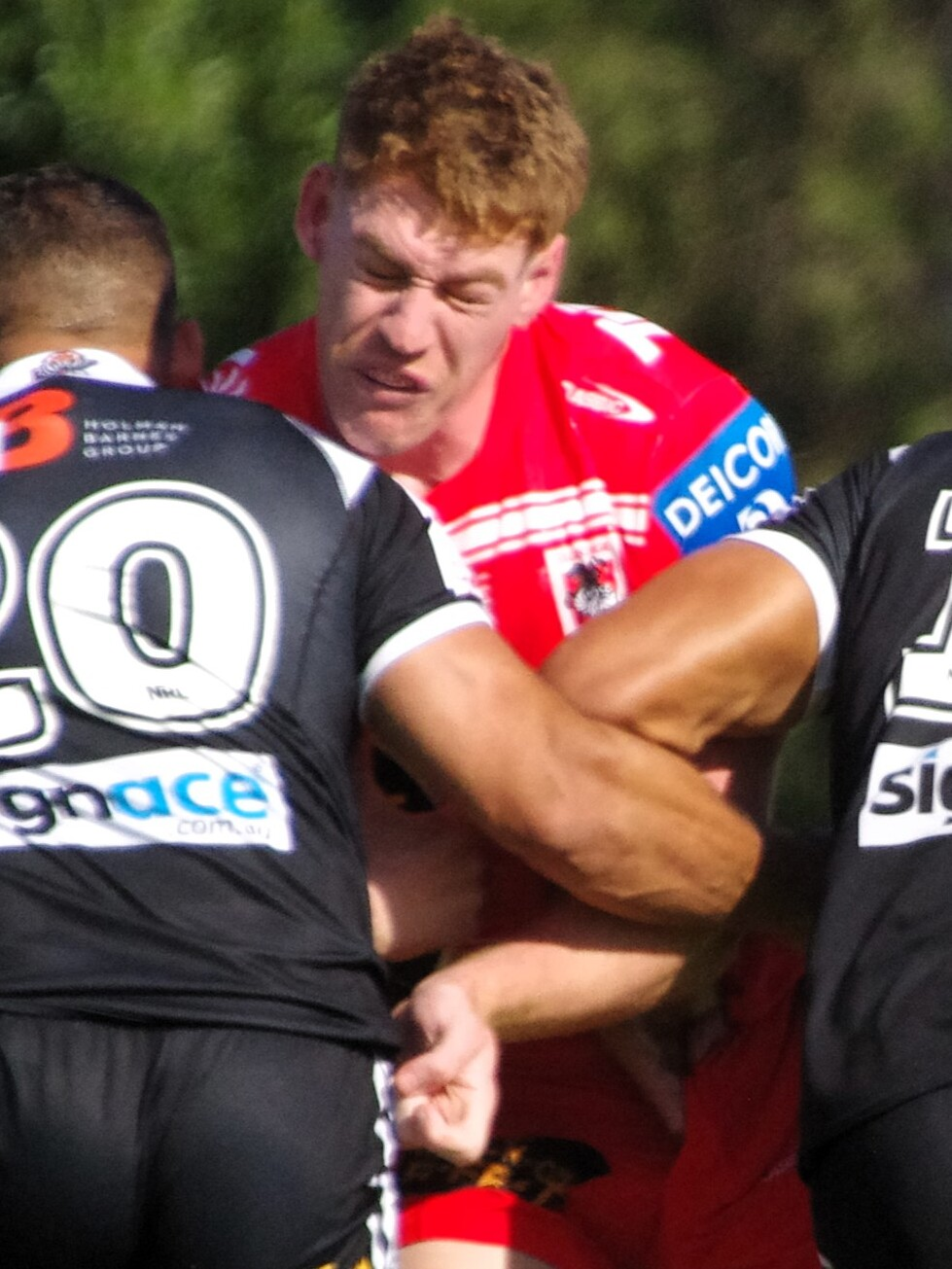

Personal information
- Full name: Daniel Russell
- Born: 5 December 1995 (age 30) Longreach, Queensland, Australia
- Height: 6 ft 4 in (1.93 m)
- Weight: 16 st 3 lb (103 kg)

Playing information
- Position: Second-row, Loose forward, Centre
Club
Years	Team	Pld	T	G	FG	P
2023–24	St. George Illawarra	8	0	0	0	0
2025	Warrington Wolves	10	1	0	0	4
2025(loan)	→ Salford Red Devils	9	0	0	0	0
2026–	Bradford Bulls	15	1	0	0	4
	Total	42	2	0	0	8
Representative
Years	Team	Pld	T	G	FG	P
2018–22	PNG PM's XIII	1	0	0	0	0
2019	Papua New Guinea 9s	3	1	0	0	4
2019–	Papua New Guinea	10	2	0	0	0
- Source: As of 20 November 2026

Daniel Russell (born 5 December 1995) is a Papua New Guinea international rugby league footballer who plays as a second-row forward for the Bradford Bulls in the Betfred Super League.

== Background ==
Russell was born in Longreach, Queensland, Australia and is of Papua New Guinean descent through his father, Mark, who was born in Port Moresby and raised in Madang but is not Papua New Guinean by blood.

Russell played his junior football for Emerald Brothers and attended The Cathedral College, Rockhampton.

== Playing career ==
=== Central Queensland Capras ===
In 2012 and 2013, Russell played for the Central Queensland Capras in the Mal Meninga Cup. In 2014, he joined the Brisbane Broncos NYC side, playing seven games for them in 2015.

=== Souths Logan Magpies ===
In 2016, Russell joined the Souths Logan Magpies, playing for their Queensland Cup side for three seasons.

=== North Queensland Cowboys ===
On 11 October 2018, Russell signed a two-year deal with the North Queensland Cowboys. He did not make his NRL debut in 2019, spending the entire season playing for the Cowboys' Queensland Cup feeder club, the Mackay Cutters. He was elevated into the Cowboy's top 30 squad for the 2020 season, after spending 2019 in the development squad.

In February 2020, Russell was a member of the Cowboys' 2020 NRL Nines winning squad. On 3 October 2020, the Cowboys announced that Russell would be departing the club at the end of the season without ever playing a first grade game. He missed the entire 2020 season after tearing his pectoral muscle. In 2021, he joined the Brisbane Tigers in the Queensland Cup.

=== St George Illawarra Dragons ===
In November 2022, Russell signed a train-and-trial contract with the St. George Illawarra Dragons for the 2023 pre-season. In round 19 of the 2023 NRL season, he made his first grade debut for St. George Illawarra against the Canberra Raiders which ended in a 36–26 loss.

On 11 September 2024, it was announced that Russell would be departing St. George Illawarra after not being offered a new contract.

=== Salford Red Devils (loan) ===
On 17 June 2025 it was reported that he had signed for Salford Red Devils in the Super League on season-long loan

=== Bradford Bulls ===
On 13 November 2025 it was reported that he had signed for Bradford Bulls in the Super League on a 1-year deal. On 19 November 2026, Russell announced his official retirement from rugby league.

=== Representative ===
On 6 October 2018, Russell started on the wing for the PNG PM's XIII in their loss to the Australian Prime Minister's XIII.

On 2 October 2019, Russell represented Papua New Guinea at the 2019 Rugby League World Cup 9s. On 9 November 2019, Russell made his Test debut for Papua New Guinea in their 20–22 loss to Fiji. On 16 November 2019, he started at second-row in Papua New Guinea's 28–10 win over Great Britain in Port Moresby.

Russell was named in the PNG squad for the 2021 Rugby League World Cup and played in all 4 of their matches during the tournament, scoring tries against Tonga and Wales

== Achievements and accolades ==
=== Team ===
- 2020 NRL Nines: North Queensland Cowboys – Winners
