= Reuben Cotter =

Australia international rugby league footballer (born 1998)

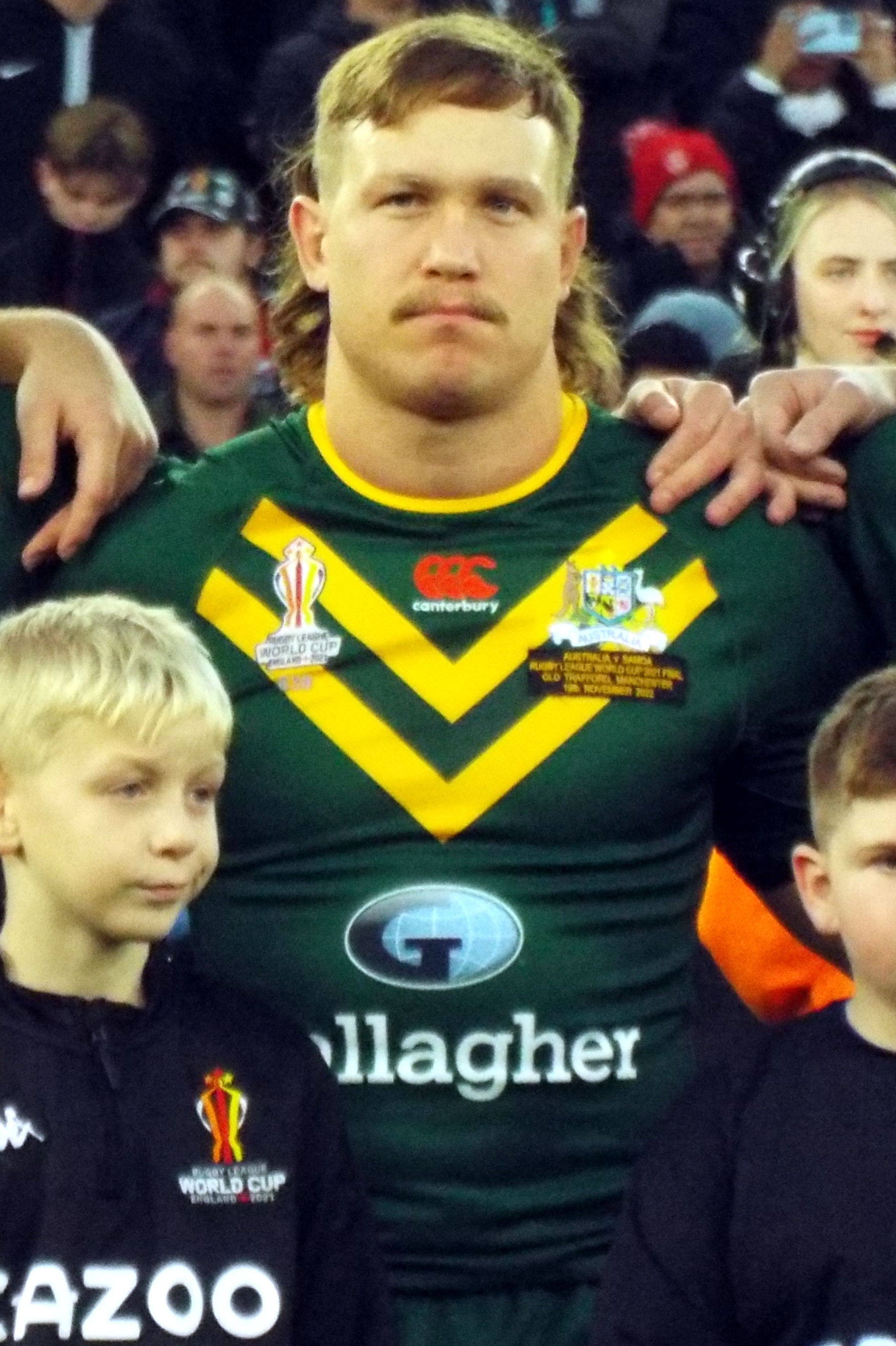

Personal information
- Born: 28 December 1998 (age 27) Mackay, Queensland, Australia
- Height: 180 cm (5 ft 11 in)
- Weight: 95 kg (14 st 13 lb)

Playing information
- Position: Lock, Prop, Second-row, Hooker
Club
Years	Team	Pld	T	G	FG	P
2019–	North Qld Cowboys	122	13	0	0	52
Representative
Years	Team	Pld	T	G	FG	P
2021–22	Indigenous All Stars	2	0	0	0	0
2022–26	Queensland	13	0	0	0	0
2022–	Australia	16	0	0	0	0
2023	Prime Minister's XIII	1	0	0	0	0
- Source: As of 16 November 2026

Reuben Cotter (born 28 December 1998) is an Australian professional rugby league footballer who captains and plays primarily as a lock or prop for the North Queensland Cowboys in the National Rugby League (NRL) and Australia at international level.

He has played at representative level for Queensland in State of Origin. He played as a hooker earlier in his career.

== Background ==
Cotter was born in Mackay, Queensland, Australia, and is of German Jewish and Torres Strait Islander descent.

He played his junior rugby league for the Sarina Crocs and attended Sarina State High School. In 2011, he captained the Central Queensland NRL bid under-13 side against Keebra Park State High School, and later joined the North Queensland Cowboys academy.

== Playing career ==
=== Early career ===
In 2013 and 2014, Cotter played for the Mackay Cutters' Cyril Connell Cup side. In February 2014, he represented the Queensland Murri under-16 side in their 18–14 win over New South Wales. In May 2014, he captained the Queensland under-16 side in their 20–18 win over New South Wales.

In 2015, Cotter moved up to the Cutters' Mal Meninga Cup side and later that year was selected at hooker in the Queensland under-18 side that defeated New South Wales 22–18. In September 2015, Cotter was selected for the Australian Schoolboys side that played a touring New Zealand under-18 team. He scored a try in the first Test, which Australia won 70–24.

In 2016, Cotter joined the North Queensland Cowboys under-20 side, playing just two games before tearing his anterior cruciate ligament (ACL), ruling him out for the season. In January 2017, he returned from his injury and was named in the Queensland under-20 Emerging Origin squad. He tore his ACL again in 2017, and subsequently missed the entire 2017 and 2018 seasons.

=== 2019 ===
In 2019, Cotter joined the North Queensland Cowboys NRL squad as a development player. On 23 February, he played his first game in almost two years in North Queensland's pre-season trial win over the Gold Coast Titans at Sunshine Coast Stadium. Cotter started the 2019 season playing for the Cowboys' Queensland Cup affiliate, the Mackay Cutters, where he scored nine tries in 15 games.

In Round 13 of the 2019 NRL season, Cotter made his NRL debut in the North Queensland Cowboys 20–22 loss to the Manly-Warringah Sea Eagles at 1300SMILES Stadium. He finished his rookie season playing five games, all off the bench.

On 4 September, Cotter signed a one-year contract extension with the North Queensland Cowboys.

=== 2020 ===
Cotter began the 2020 season playing for the Mackay Cutters, scoring two tries in a 22–23 loss to the Norths Devils. After returning to the North Queensland side in Round 5, he played four games off the bench. In Round 15, he started at hooker for the first time replacing the injured Reece Robson. He finished the season as the club's starting hooker, playing six games in the position.

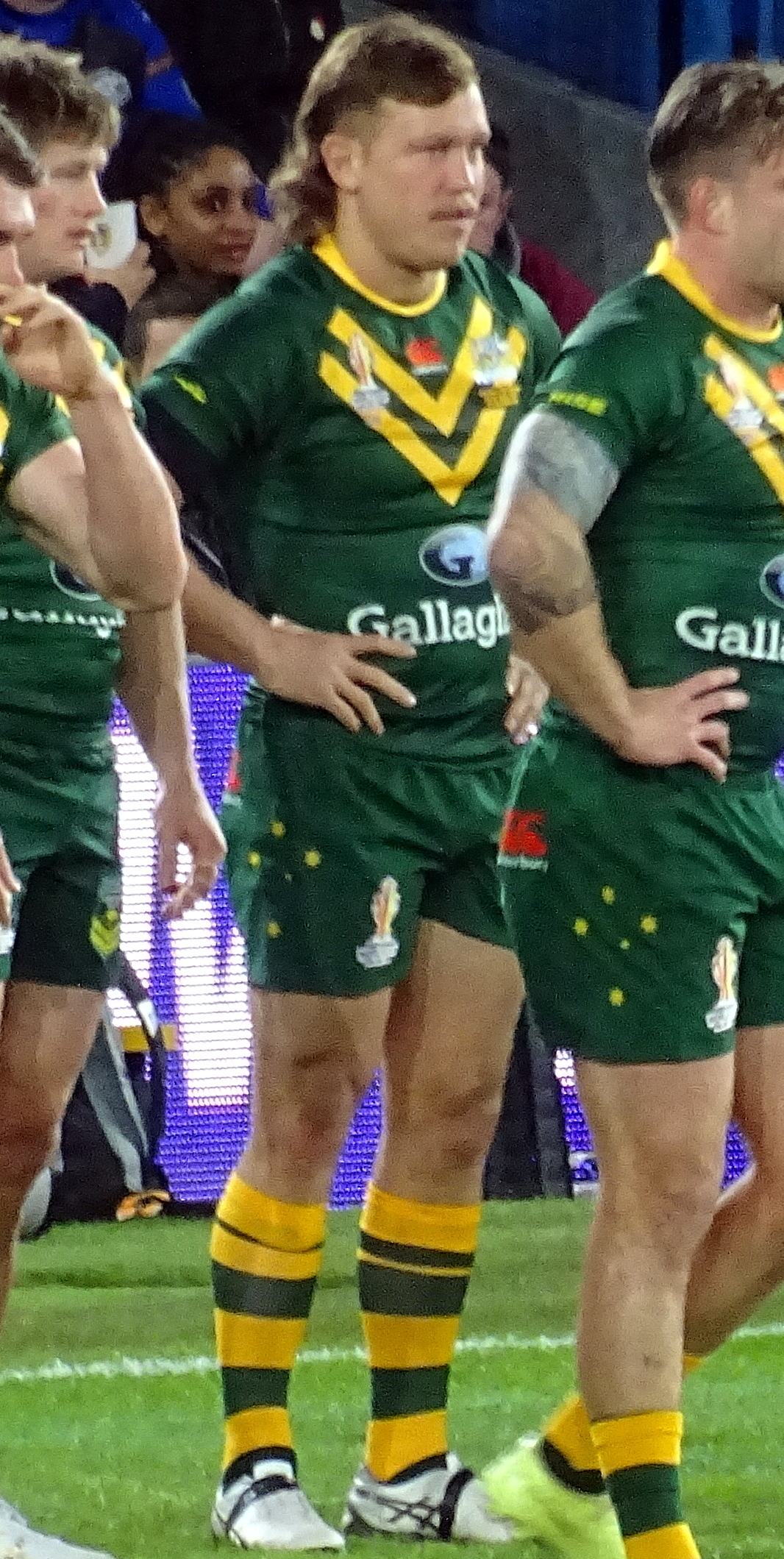
Cotter warming up for Australia in 2022

On 30 September, Cotter re-signed with the North Queensland side until the end of the 2022 season.

=== 2021 ===
Cotter made only six appearances for the North Queensland club in the 2021 NRL season as they finished 15th on the table.

=== 2022 ===
In June, Cotter was selected for game one of the 2022 State of Origin series which Queensland won 16-10 at Stadium Australia. Cotter played 18 matches for North Queensland in the 2022 NRL season as the club finished third on the table and qualified for the finals. Cotter played in both finals matches including their preliminary final loss to Parramatta, scoring a try in the 24-20 loss.

In October, he was named in the Australia squad for the 2021 Rugby League World Cup and played two games in the tournament.

=== 2023 ===
Cotter played all three games in the 2023 State of Origin series. Cotter won the Wally Lewis medal for man of the series.

Cotter played 20 games for North Queensland in the 2023 NRL season as the club finished 11th on the table.

=== 2024 ===
Cotter was named in the front row for Queensland ahead of game one in the 2024 State of Origin series.

On 2 September it was announced that Cotter had re-signed with the club until the end of the 2028 season.

Cotter played 24 matches for North Queensland in the 2024 NRL season as the club finished 5th on the table. Cotter played in both finals matches as they were eliminated in the second week by Cronulla.

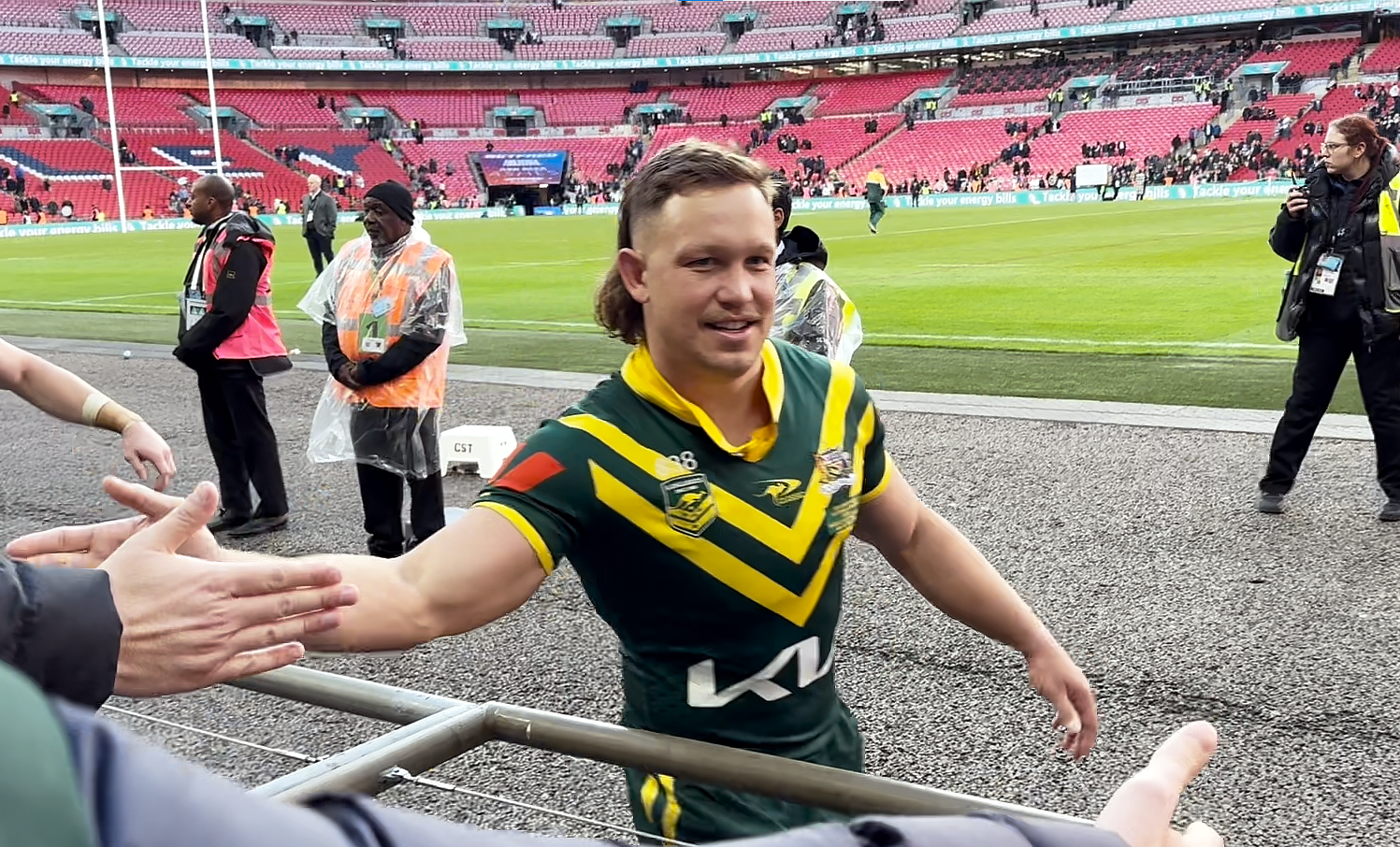
Cotter post match with Australia in 2025

=== 2025 ===
In May, Cotter was selected by Queensland for the 2025 State of Origin series. He played in all three games for Queensland as they upset New South Wales 2-1 to win the series.

Cotter played 18 matches for North Queensland in the 2025 NRL season as the club finished 12th on the table.

=== 2026 ===
Cotter played 22 games for North Queensland in the 2026 NRL season as the club finished 8th and qualified for the finals. Cotter played in the clubs elimination final loss to Cronulla.

The forward then featured 5-times for the Kangaroos at the 2026 Rugby League World Cup and came off the bench in their eventual win over New Zealand in the final.

== Statistics ==
=== NRL ===
Season	Team	Matches	T	G	GK %	F/G	Pts
2019	North Queensland Cowboys	5	0	0	—	0	0
2020	North Queensland Cowboys	10	0	0	—	0	0
2021	North Queensland Cowboys	6	0	0	—	0	0
2022	North Queensland Cowboys	18	2	0	—	0	8
2023	North Queensland Cowboys	20	4				16
2024	North Queensland Cowboys	24	4				16
2025	North Queensland Cowboys	18					
2026	North Queensland Cowboys	9	1				4
Career totals		109	11	0	—	0	44

== Honours ==
Representative

- Rugby League World Cup Champion: 2026
