= Shane Wright (rugby league) =

Australian rugby league footballer

Personal information
- Born: 13 March 1996 (age 30) Perth, Western Australia, Australia
- Height: 6 ft 2 in (1.88 m)
- Weight: 15 st 13 lb (101 kg)

Playing information
- Position: Second-row, Loose forward, Centre
Club
Years	Team	Pld	T	G	FG	P
2017–21	North Qld Cowboys	41	3	0	0	12
2022–25	Salford Red Devils	61	8	0	0	32
2025(loan)	→ St Helens	3	1	0	0	4
2026–	St Helens	26	6	0	0	24
	Total	131	18	0	0	72
- Source: As of 1 September 2026

Shane Wright (born 13 March 1996) is an Australian professional rugby league footballer who plays as a second-row forward for St Helens in the Super League.

== Background ==
Wright was born in Perth, Western Australia. He played his junior rugby league for the Proserpine Whitsunday Brahmans before being signed by the Manly Warringah Sea Eagles at the age of 14. Wright then moved to the Gold Coast, Queensland, attending Palm Beach Currumbin State High School and playing junior rugby league for the Burleigh Bears before being signed by the Gold Coast Titans.

== Playing career ==
=== Early career ===
In 2015 and 2016, Wright played for the Gold Coast Titans' NYC team. In November 2016, he signed a two-year contract with the North Queensland Cowboys starting in 2017.

=== 2017 ===
In round 24 of the 2017 NRL season, Wright made his NRL debut for the North Queensland Cowboys against the Cronulla-Sutherland Sharks.

=== 2018 ===
On April 17, Wright re-signed with the North Queensland club until the end of the 2020 NRL season. He spent the majority of the 2018 season playing for the Mackay Cutters, registering just two NRL games for the North Queensland side, which included a start at second row in their Round 18 loss to the Canberra Raiders.

=== 2019 ===
After starting the season playing for the Mackay Cutters, Wright earned an NRL call-up in Round 11, coming off the bench in a 22–16 win over the Canberra Raiders. By Round 15, Wright had forced his way into the starting line up at second row, where he would remain for the rest of the season. In Round 21, he scored his first NRL try in a 14–18 loss to the Brisbane Broncos. In Round 24, Wright scored the final try at Willows Sports Complex in a 15–8 win over the Canterbury-Bankstown Bulldogs. On 18 September, he was named the Cowboys' 2019 Rookie of the Year at the club's presentation night.

=== 2020 ===
In February, Wright was a member of the North Queensland club's 2020 NRL Nines winning squad. On 3 June, he re-signed with the North Queensland outfit until the end of the 2021 NRL season. Wright played just eight NRL games for North Queensland in 2020, starting six at second-row.

=== 2021 ===
On 16 Oct 2021 it was reported that he had signed for the Salford Red Devils in the Super League

=== 2022 & 2023 ===
Wright played 12 games for Salford in the 2022 Super League season as they got to within one game of the grand final but were defeated 19-12 by St Helens. In the 2023 Super League season, Wright played 12 matches for Salford as the club finished 7th on the table and missed the playoffs.

=== 2025 ===
On 29 August, it was reported that he had signed for St Helens in the Super League on loan for the remainder of the 2025 season

In the elimination playoff game against Leeds, Wright was called into the side as a replacement on the interchange bench. Wright went on to score the match winning try for St Helens after the full-time siren as they won 16-14.

On 29 September 2025 it was reported that he had signed a two-year permanent contract with St Helens.

=== 2026 ===
Wright played 23 matches for St Helens in the 2026 Super League season as the club finished 7th on the table and missed the playoffs. It was the first time the club had missed the playoffs in the Super League era.

== Achievements and accolades ==
=== Individual ===
- North Queensland Cowboys Rookie of the Year: 2019

=== Team ===
- 2020 NRL Nines: North Queensland Cowboys – Winners

== Statistics ==
=== NRL / Super league ===
Season	Team	Matches	T	G	GK %	F/G	Pts
2017	North Queensland Cowboys	1	0	0	—	0	0
2018	North Queensland Cowboys	2	0	0	—	0	0
2019	North Queensland Cowboys	14	2	0	—	0	8
2020	North Queensland Cowboys	8	0	0	—	0	0
2021	North Queensland Cowboys	16	1				4
2022	Salford Red Devils	12	2				8
2023	Salford Red Devils	12	4				16
2024	Salford Red Devils	27	2				8
2025	Salford Red Devils						
2025	→ St Helens (loan)						
2026	St Helens						
Career totals		93	11	0	—	0	32
