= Setaimata Sa =

Samoan rugby league and rugby union footballer

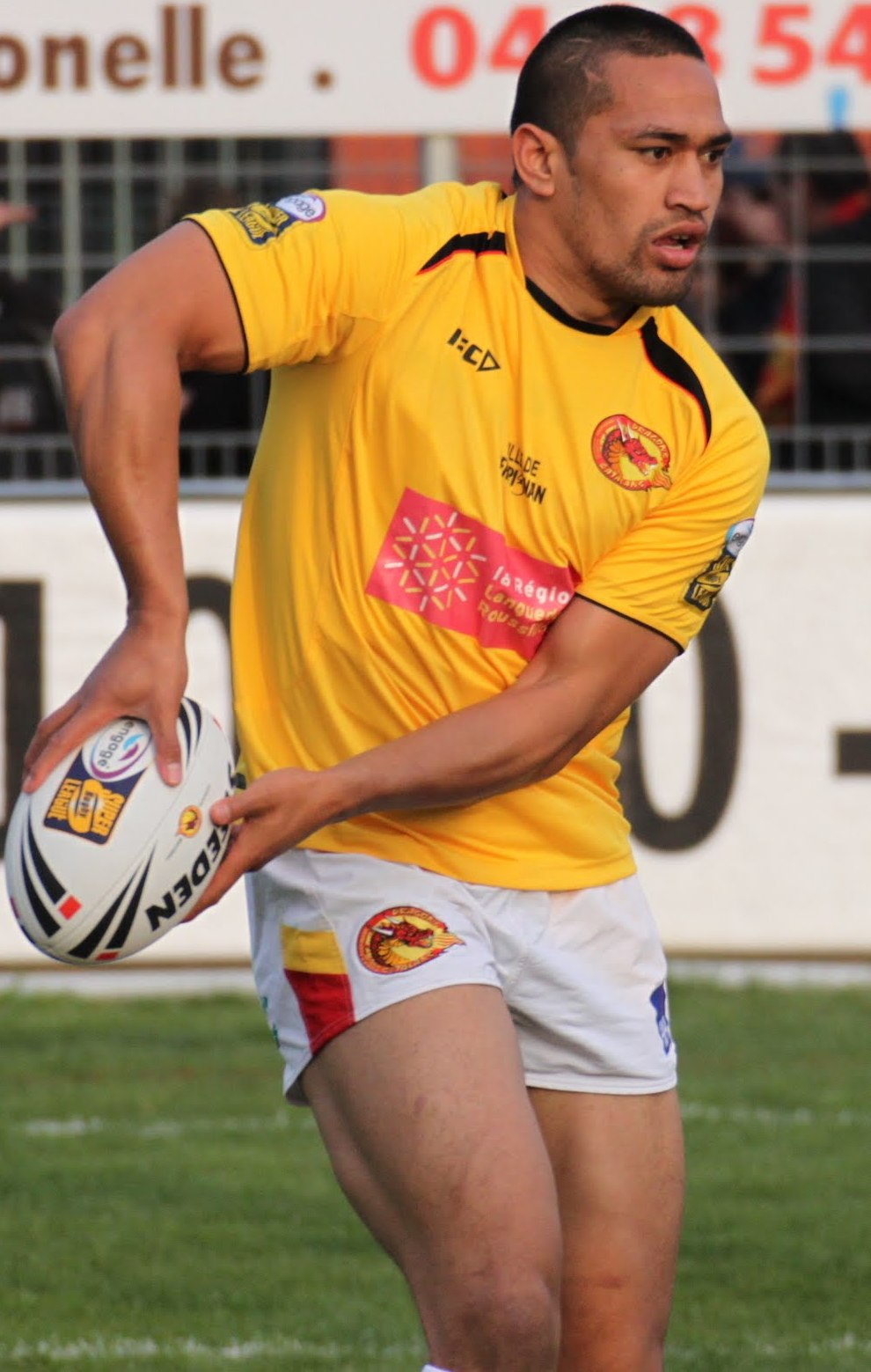

Personal information
- Born: 14 September 1987 (age 39) Western Samoa
- Height: 187 cm (6 ft 2 in)
- Weight: 102 kg (16 st 1 lb)

Playing information

Rugby league
- Position: Second-row, Centre, Lock, Five-eighth
Club
Years	Team	Pld	T	G	FG	P
2006–09	Sydney Roosters	66	13	0	0	52
2010–12	Catalans Dragons	69	24	0	0	96
2014–15	Hull F.C.	26	6	0	0	24
2016	Widnes Vikings	13	3	1	0	0
	Total	174	46	1	0	172
Representative
Years	Team	Pld	T	G	FG	P
2006	Samoa	5	5	0	0	20
2008	New Zealand	4	1	0	0	4

Rugby union
- Position: Centre
Club
Years	Team	Pld	T	G	FG	P
2013–14	London Irish	4	0	0	0	0
Representative
Years	Team	Pld	T	G	FG	P
2012	Samoa	1	0	0	0	0
- Source: As of 17 September 2009

Setaimata Sa (born 14 September 1987) is a professional rugby league footballer who last played for the Mackay Cutters in the Intrust Super Cup.

== Background ==
Sa was born in Samoa. His junior club was Shirley before he was poached by the Papanui Tigers as a 9 year old in the Canterbury Rugby League competition.

== Rugby league career ==
Sa made his first grade debut for the Sydney Roosters against St. George Illawarra in round 7 of the 2006 NRL season. In his final year at the club during the 2009 NRL season, he made 20 appearances as the Sydney Roosters finished last for the first time since 1966 and claimed the Wooden Spoon. On 30 August 2009, Setaimata Sa was charged with assault, resisting arrest, malicious damage and failure to leave a licensed premises, after a drunken episode in a Sydney hotel. He played for the Catalans Dragons in 2010 after sealing a release from the final two years of his Sydney Roosters contract. The deal was a part exchange transfer involving Jason Ryles moving in the opposite direction.

In 2014 Sa transferred to Hull F.C. on a contract until the end of 2015. On 25 October 2016, Sa signed a three-year contract with Australian Rugby League team Mackay Cutters who play in the Intrust Super Cup.

== International career ==
He was called up for the 2008 ANZAC day test at the SCG. In August 2008, Sa was named in the New Zealand training squad for the 2008 Rugby League World Cup, and in October 2008, he was named in the final 24-man Kiwi squad.

He also represented Samoa on five occasions scoring four tries. In 2006 he was selected for the New Zealand Tri-Nations squad but was not selected for any of the matches in the series. In 2007 he was in running to be selected for New Zealand again but missed out through injury along with Kiwi international and Sydney Roosters teammate Iosia Soliola. Sa was a member of the World Cup winning New Zealand team beating Australia in the 2008 World Cup Final at Suncorp Stadium, Brisbane. Sa was eligible to represent Samoa.

== Rugby union career ==
When at Shirley Boys' High School in Christchurch he played Rugby for the school's first XV.

In 2012 Sa signed a contract to switch codes and play rugby union for the London Irish club, which was finally completed in January 2013 after he received a work permit.

On 9 November 2012, he made his debut for the Samoan national team against Canada.
