= Nicho Hynes =

Australia international rugby league footballer

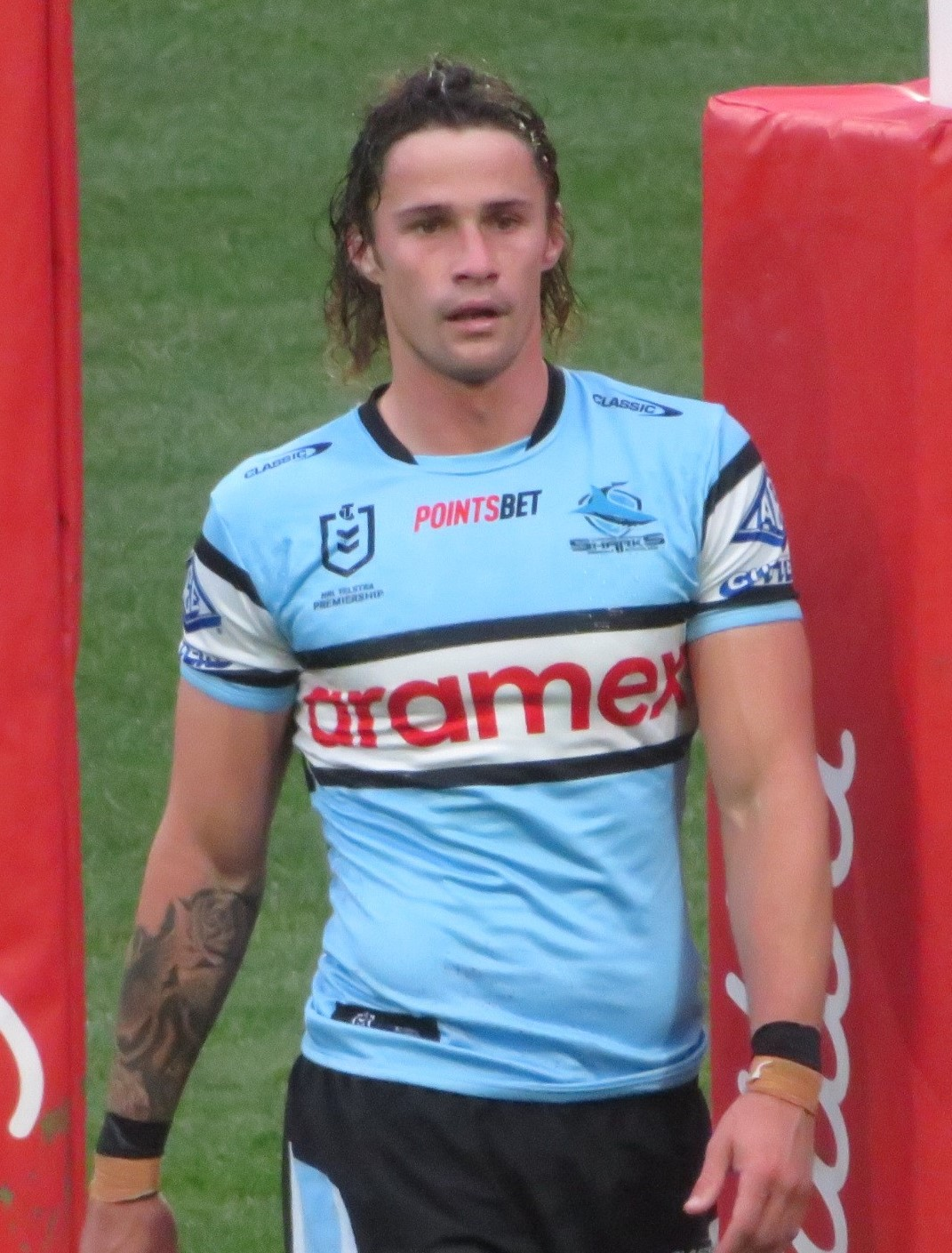

Personal information
- Full name: Nicholas Michael Hynes
- Born: 18 June 1996 (age 30) Gosford, New South Wales, Australia
- Height: 188 cm (6 ft 2 in)
- Weight: 90 kg (14 st 2 lb)

Playing information
- Position: Halfback, Fullback
Club
Years	Team	Pld	T	G	FG	P
2019–21	Melbourne Storm	36	10	62	0	164
2022–	Cronulla Sharks	113	29	418	6	958
	Total	149	39	480	6	1122
Representative
Years	Team	Pld	T	G	FG	P
2022–24	Indigenous All Stars	3	1	5	0	14
2023–24	New South Wales	2	0	1	0	2
2023	Prime Minister's XIII	1	0	0	0	0
2023	Australia	2	0	0	0	0
- Source: As of 19 September 2026

Nicholas Michael Hynes (born 18 June 1996) is an Australian professional rugby league footballer who plays as a halfback for the Cronulla-Sutherland Sharks in the National Rugby League and Australia at international level. He previously played as a fullback for the Melbourne Storm in the NRL.

== Early life ==
Hynes was born in Gosford, New South Wales, Australia and is of Indigenous Australian descent and Scottish descent.

Hynes grew up on the Central Coast of New South Wales and was educated at Brisbane Water Secondary College, Central Coast.

He played his junior rugby league for the Umina Beach Bunnies and Woy Woy Roosters, before signing with the Manly-Warringah Sea Eagles.

== Playing career ==
=== Early career ===
Hynes was signed by the Manly-Warringah Sea Eagles NRL Under-20s team in 2015, before spending the next two seasons (2017–18) with the Mackay Cutters, where he played 42 Queensland Cup matches. He was also taking part in a teacher aide job at a Mackay primary school at the time.

=== Melbourne Storm (2019–2021) ===
First-grade debut and premiership season (2019–20)

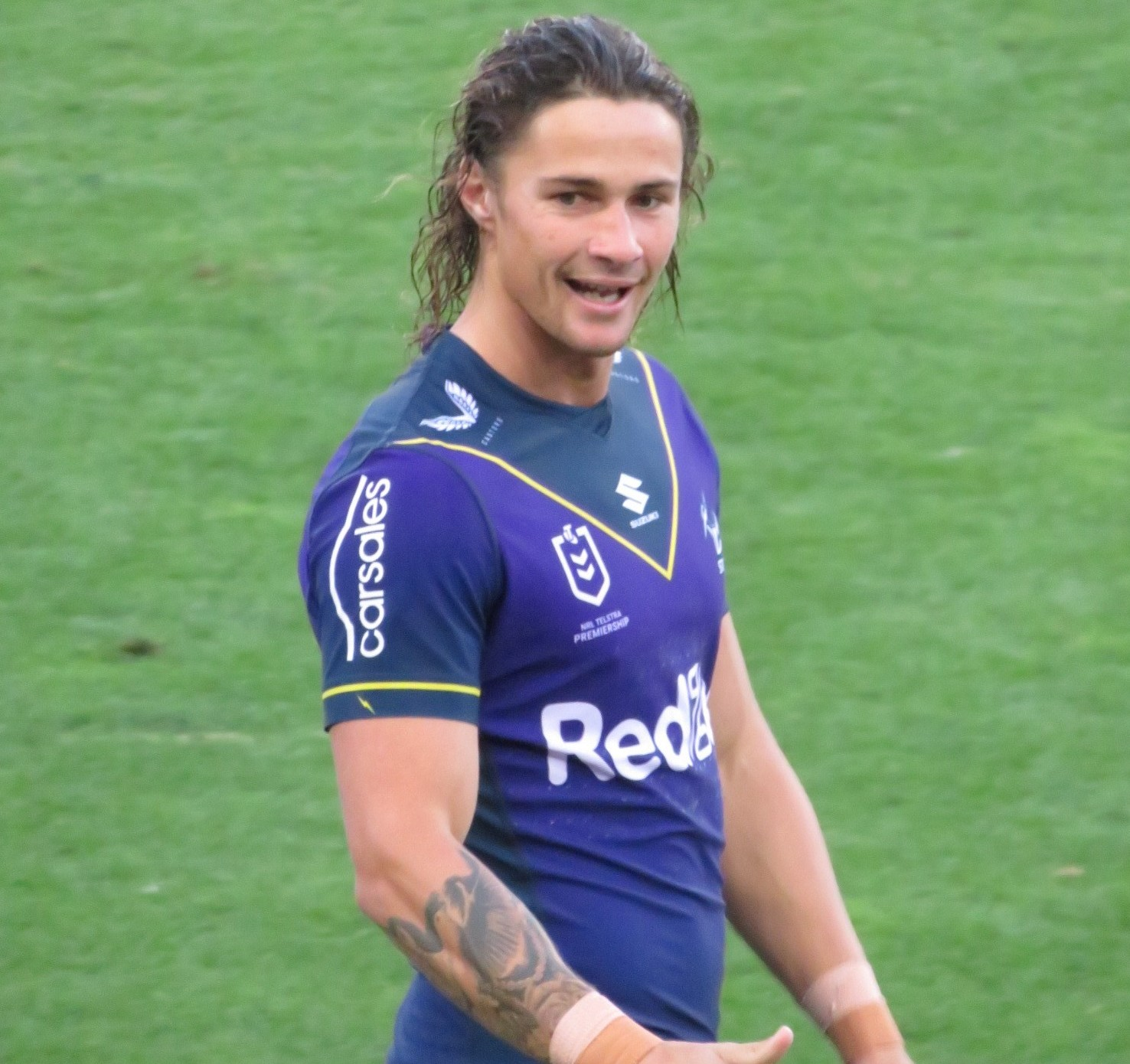
Hynes while playing with the Melbourne Storm

In 2019, Hynes signed with the Melbourne Storm transferring to their feeder club Sunshine Coast Falcons to continue playing in the Queensland Cup.

On 11 August 2019, Hynes made his NRL debut for the Melbourne Storm against South Sydney. He made his debut in his hometown in front of family and friends at Central Coast Stadium. He had his Melbourne jersey (cap number 198) presented to him by his older brother Wade Hynes.

Following the cancellation of the 2020 Queensland Cup, Hynes played 11 NRL matches in a utility role, mostly from the interchange bench, signing a further one year contract extension in September 2020.

Hynes was named on the bench in the Storm's 26–20 NRL Grand Final win over the Penrith Panthers. On this day, he wrote his name in the history books as the first player in the NRL era to be selected in a grand final but not play a single minute. Records therefore show he was not credited for appearing in the match. The last time a team used less than 17 players in a grand final was the 1994 NSWRL Grand Final, when the victorious Canberra Raiders chose not to use two of their four substitutes.

Shift into the starting fullback role with more playing time, final season in Melbourne (2021)

On 1 June 2021, it was announced Hynes would be leaving the Melbourne club at the end of the 2021 NRL season to link up with Cronulla-Sutherland, with a view to shift into the halves and rebuild the club around him. After a solid start to the season for the Melbourne Storm, Hynes was named in the extended NSW Blues side for game 3 of the 2021 State of Origin series.

=== Cronulla-Sutherland Sharks (2022–) ===
Elevation to one of the league's top superstars, Dally M Medal Winner (2022)

In round 1 of the 2022 NRL season, Hynes made his club debut for Cronulla-Sutherland in their 24–19 loss against Canberra. In round 2, Hynes kicked the winning conversion for Cronulla after the full time siren to defeat Parramatta 18–16. On 29 May, Hynes was selected as 18th man by New South Wales in game one of the 2022 State of Origin series, but did not play. In round 20, Hynes kicked a field goal in golden point extra-time to win the match 21–20 over South Sydney. In round 23, Hynes starred for Cronulla scoring two tries in a 40–6 victory over Manly in the battle of the beaches game. Hynes capped off his first season at the Sharks receiving the Dally M Medal and the Provan-Summons Medal on 28 September.

Top 3 in Dally M Medal voting, representative football debut for NSW and Australia (2023)

In round 4 of the 2023 NRL season, Hynes made his return for Cronulla in their 40–8 victory over rivals St. George Illawarra after being injured in the opening rounds. On 6 April 2023, Hynes signed a five-year contract extension to remain at Cronulla until the end of the 2029 season. In round 9 of the 2023 NRL season, Hynes scored one try and kicked eight goals as Cronulla defeated North Queensland 44–6. Hynes was awarded with the inaugural Paul Green medal following the game. On 22 May, Hynes was selected by New South Wales for game one of the 2023 State of Origin series. On 12 June 2023, it was announced that Hynes had not been selected by New South Wales for game two of the 2023 State of Origin series. Hynes played a total of 21 games for Cronulla in the 2023 NRL season as Cronulla finished sixth on the table. Hynes played in the clubs 13–12 upset loss against the Sydney Roosters which ended their season. On 26 May 2024, Hynes was named at halfback for New South Wales ahead of the 2024 State of Origin series. On 16 June, Hynes was informed by New South Wales head coach Michael Maguire that he would not be required for game two of the 2024 State of Origin series following the New South Wales team's 38–10 loss in game one. On 11 July, it was announced that Hynes would miss eight weeks with a leg injury which he sustained in a training drill before Cronulla's round 19 game against the Wests Tigers. Hynes played 18 games for Cronulla in the 2024 NRL season as the club finished 4th on the table and qualified for the finals. Hynes played in all three of Cronulla's finals matches including their preliminary final loss against Penrith. Hynes played 27 matches for Cronulla in the 2025 NRL season as the club finished 5th on the table. The club reached the preliminary final for a second consecutive season but lost against Melbourne 22–14. In round 19 of the 2026 NRL season, Hynes set a points scoring record for Cronulla as he scored 30 individual points against the Dolphins. It was also Cronulla's biggest victory in their history as they won the game 66–0. Hynes played 22 matches for Cronulla in the 2026 NRL season as the club finished 5th on the table and qualified for the finals. In the semi-final against the Sydney Roosters, Hynes was taken from the field in the opening minutes and did not return to the field as Cronulla were soundly beaten.

== Honours ==
Club

- 2020 NRL Grand Final Winners
- 2021 Minor Premiership Winners

Individual

- 2022 Dally M Medal Winner
- 2022 Provan-Summons Medal Winner
- 2023 Provan-Summons Medal Winner

== Statistics ==
=== NRL ===
Season	Team	Matches	T	G	GK %	F/G	Pts
2019	Melbourne Storm	1	0	0	—	0	0
2020	Melbourne Storm	11	3	4	100.00%	0	20
2021	Melbourne Storm	24	7	58	75.36%	0	144
2022	Cronulla-Sutherland	25	6	83	74.11%	4	194
2023	Cronulla-Sutherland	21	5	83	79.05%	1	187
2024	Cronulla-Sutherland	18	2	61	93.18%	1	131
2025	Cronulla-Sutherland	27	8	98	78.30%		228
2026	Cronulla-Sutherland	22	8	93			218
Career totals		149	39	480	78.32%	6	1122

=== All Star ===
Season	Team	Matches	T	G	GK %	F/G	Pts
2022	Indigenous All Stars	1	0	0/2	—	0	0
Career totals		1	0	0.00%	—	0	0
