= 2020 NRL Nines =

Rugby tournament

Tournament information
- Location: HBF Park, Perth
- Dates: 14–15 February
- Teams: 16 Male; 4 Female

Final positions
- Champions: North Queensland Cowboys (2nd title) (Men's); St. George Illawarra Dragons (1st title) (Women's)
- Runner-up: St. George Illawarra Dragons (Men's); Brisbane Broncos (Women's)

Tournament statistics
- Matches played: 30
- Points scored: 792 (26.4 per match)
- Tries scored: 150 (5 per match)
- Attendance: 10,128 (1st day); 14,739 (2nd day)
- MVP: Scott Drinkwater (Men's); Maddie Studdon (Women's)
- Top try scorer(s): Cody Ramsey & Hamiso Tabuai-Fidow (4) (Men's); Jayme Fressard (3) (Women's)

The 2020 NRL Nines was the fifth edition of the NRL Nines rugby league nines and the first one hosted outside of Auckland. It was played at HBF Park, Perth on 14–15 February 2020. Just like previous tournaments, it was contested by all 16 National Rugby League teams, but for the first time, the four NRL Women's Premiership teams played as well, as opposed to the Jillaroos and Kiwi Ferns like in former editions. The men's tournament was split into four pools of four teams (1, 2, 3 & 4) and then into two groups of two teams in each pool (A & B). Each side was initially to play two games, against the teams from the other group of their pool. The top two teams in each pool then played off in a knockout-style tournament. The women's tournament, meanwhile, was a round-robin with each team playing three games, one against each of the others, before the top two teams met in the final. The tournament was drawn on 6 December 2019.

The Cowboys took out the men's title, beating the Dragons 23–14 in the final. Meanwhile, the Dragons won the women's title, with a 28–4 victory over the Broncos.

== Men's tournament ==
=== Pool 1 ===
Pool 1
Team	Pld	W	D	L	PF	PA	PD	Pts
Newcastle Knights	2	2	0	0	50	4	+46	4
Penrith Panthers	2	1	0	1	39	16	+23	2
Sydney Roosters	2	1	0	1	14	43	−29	2
New Zealand Warriors	2	0	0	2	8	48	−40	0

14 February 2020	Penrith Panthers	35–0	Sydney Roosters	Perth, Western Australia
16:30 WST	Tries Viliame Kikau 0'; Brent Naden 4'; Josh Mansour 7'; Viliame Kikau 9'; Api Koroisau 13'; Nathan Cleary 17' Conversions; Nathan Cleary 2'; Matt Burton 5'; Matt Burton 7'; Nathan Cleary 14'			Stadium: HBF Park

14 February 2020	New Zealand Warriors	0–34	Newcastle Knights	Perth, Western Australia
16:55 WST			Tries Mason Lino 4'; Starford To'a 7'; Brodie Jones 10'; Sione Mata'utia 11'; Tex Hoy 14'; Matthew Soper-Lawler 17' Conversions; Mason Lino 5'; Mason Lino 8'; Mason Lino 10'; Mason Lino 11'	Stadium: HBF Park

15 February 2020	Newcastle Knights	16–4	Penrith Panthers	Perth, Western Australia
11:10 WST	Tries Nathanael Sasagi 6'; Jacob Saifiti 11'; Tex Hoy 14' Conversions; Mason Lino 12'; Mason Lino 15'		Tries Liam Martin 5'	Stadium: HBF Park

15 February 2020	Sydney Roosters	14–8	New Zealand Warriors	Perth, Western Australia
11:35 WST	Tries McKenzie Baker 5'; McKenzie Baker 8'; McKenzie Baker 13' Conversions; Nick Davis 14'		Tries Paul Turner 2'; Rocco Berry 11'	Stadium: HBF Park

=== Pool 2 ===
Pool 2
Team	Pld	W	D	L	PF	PA	PD	Pts
St. George Illawarra Dragons	2	1	0	1	34	20	+14	2
Parramatta Eels	2	1	0	1	25	20	+5	2
Cronulla-Sutherland Sharks	2	1	0	1	30	31	−1	2
Canterbury-Bankstown Bulldogs	2	1	0	1	17	35	−18	2

14 February 2020	Canterbury-Bankstown Bulldogs	13–10	Parramatta Eels	Perth, Western Australia
17:20 WST	Tries Morgan Harper 5'; Corey Harawira-Naera 16' Conversions; Morgan Harper 5'; Morgan Harper 16'		Tries Blake Ferguson 2'; Jaeman Salmon 6' Conversions; Brad Takairangi 7'	Stadium: HBF Park

14 February 2020	St. George Illawarra Dragons	27–5	Cronulla-Sutherland Sharks	Perth, Western Australia
17:45 WST	Tries Josh Kerr 5'; Tyrell Fuimaono 7'; Cameron McInnes 11'; Tristan Sailor 13'; Josh Kerr 16' Conversions; Ben Hunt 11'; Tristan Sailor 14'		Tries Sione Katoa 3'	Stadium: HBF Park

15 February 2020	Cronulla-Sutherland Sharks	25–4	Canterbury-Bankstown Bulldogs	Perth, Western Australia
12:00 WST	Tries Ronaldo Mulitalo 3'; Connor Tracey 5'; Josh Morris 6'; Josh Morris 8'; Josh Morris 16' Conversions; Shaun Johnson 5'; Shaun Johnson 17'		Tries Jake Averillo 0'	Stadium: HBF Park

15 February 2020	Parramatta Eels	15–7	St. George Illawarra Dragons	Perth, Western Australia
12:25 WST	Tries Haze Dunster 8'; Will Smith 15'; Clint Gutherson 16' Conversions; Clint Gutherson 15'		Tries Cody Ramsey 11' Conversions; Tristan Sailor 12'	Stadium: HBF Park

=== Pool 3 ===
Pool 3
Team	Pld	W	D	L	PF	PA	PD	Pts
Gold Coast Titans	2	2	0	0	41	23	+18	4
South Sydney Rabbitohs	2	1	0	1	37	25	+12	2
Wests Tigers	2	1	0	1	30	22	+8	2
Canberra Raiders	2	0	0	2	18	56	−38	0

14 February 2020	Canberra Raiders	10–27	Gold Coast Titans	Perth, Western Australia
18:15 WST	Tries Matthew Timoko 0'; Matthew Timoko 7' Conversions; Matt Frawley 2'		Tries Greg Leleisiuao 4'; Michael Gordon 5'; Anthony Don 9'; Jonus Pearson 12'; Jonus Pearson 14' Conversions; Tanah Boyd 4'; Tanah Boyd 9'; Tanah Boyd 14'	Stadium: HBF Park

14 February 2020	Wests Tigers	17–8	South Sydney Rabbitohs	Perth, Western Australia
18:40 WST	Tries Billy Walters 1'; Sam McIntyre 5'; Thomas Mikaele 8' Conversions; Paul Momirovski 2'; Pat Richards 9'		Tries Campbell Graham 11'; Edene Gebbie 16'	Stadium: HBF Park

15 February 2020	South Sydney Rabbitohs	29–8	Canberra Raiders	Perth, Western Australia
12:55 WST	Tries Joshua Cook 6'; Blake Taaffe 7'; Lachlan Ilias 9'; Campbell Graham 13'; Dane Gagai 14'; Bryson Goodwin 17' Conversions; Blake Taaffe 6'; Dane Gagai 8'		Tries Harley Smith-Shields 1'; Daine Spencer 4'	Stadium: HBF Park

15 February 2020	Gold Coast Titans	14–13	Wests Tigers	Perth, Western Australia
13:20 WST	Tries Jai Whitbread 2'; Phillip Sami 5'; Ash Taylor 14' Conversions; Tyrone Peachey 2'		Tries Luke Garner 7'; David Nofoaluma 17' Conversions; Jock Madden 8'; Jock Madden 17'	Stadium: HBF Park

=== Pool 4 ===
Pool 4
Team	Pld	W	D	L	PF	PA	PD	Pts
North Queensland Cowboys	2	2	0	0	27	18	+9	4
Manly Warringah Sea Eagles	2	1	0	1	25	14	+11	2
Brisbane Broncos	2	1	0	1	23	25	−2	2
Melbourne Storm	2	0	0	2	12	30	−18	0

14 February 2020	North Queensland Cowboys	17–11	Brisbane Broncos	Perth, Western Australia
19:05 WST	Tries Coen Hess 6'; Scott Drinkwater 10'; Hamiso Tabuai-Fidow 13' Conversions; Jake Clifford 11'; Jake Clifford 14'		Tries Jake Turpin 8'; Jesse Arthars 15' Conversions; Jamayne Isaako 9'	Stadium: HBF Park

14 February 2020	Melbourne Storm	4–18	Manly Warringah Sea Eagles	Perth, Western Australia
19:30 WST	Tries Cameron Munster 13'		Tries Luke Metcalf 1'; Reuben Garrick 7'; Luke Metcalf 16' Conversions; Cade Cust 1'; Reed Izzard 8'	Stadium: HBF Park

15 February 2020	Manly Warringah Sea Eagles	7–10	North Queensland Cowboys	Perth, Western Australia
13:45 WST	Tries Luke Metcalf 6' Conversions; Luke Metcalf 6'		Tries Tom Opacic 2'; Murray Taulagi 8' Conversions; Scott Drinkwater 8'	Stadium: HBF Park

15 February 2020	Brisbane Broncos	12–8	Melbourne Storm	Perth, Western Australia
14:10 WST	Tries Jamayne Isaako 10'; Kotoni Staggs 12' Conversions; Jamayne Isaako 11'; Jamayne Isaako 13'		Tries Tino Fa'asuamaleaui 5'; Dean Ieremia 8'	Stadium: HBF Park

=== Finals ===
Quarter-finals
Newcastle Knights	7
Parramatta Eels	14
St. George Illawarra Dragons	17
Penrith Panthers	14
Gold Coast Titans	24
Manly Warringah Sea Eagles	0
North Queensland Cowboys	20
South Sydney Rabbitohs	6

Semi-finals
Parramatta Eels	6
St. George Illawarra Dragons	8
Gold Coast Titans	10
North Queensland Cowboys	19

Final
St. George Illawarra Dragons	14
North Queensland Cowboys	23

==== Quarter-finals ====
15 February 2020	Newcastle Knights	7–14	Parramatta Eels	Perth, Western Australia
14:40 WST	Tries Tex Hoy 10' Conversions; Tyronne Roberts-Davis 10'		Tries Ryan Matterson 2'; Haze Dunster 6'; Blake Ferguson 15' Conversions; Brad Takairangi 6'	Stadium: HBF Park

15 February 2020	St. George Illawarra Dragons	17–14	Penrith Panthers	Perth, Western Australia
15:05 WST	Tries Cody Ramsey 6'; Cody Ramsey 12'; Cody Ramsey 18' Conversions; Tristan Sailor 6'; Tristan Sailor 13'		Tries Api Koroisau 9'; Api Koroisau 14'; Viliame Kikau 16' Conversions; Nathan Cleary 10'	Stadium: HBF Park

15 February 2020	Gold Coast Titans	24–0	Manly Warringah Sea Eagles	Perth, Western Australia
15:30 WST	Tries Jai Arrow 1'; Phillip Sami 4'; Phillip Sami 6'; Jonus Pearson 8'; Mitch Rein 11'; Anthony Don 16'			Stadium: HBF Park

15 February 2020	North Queensland Cowboys	20–6	South Sydney Rabbitohs	Perth, Western Australia
15:55 WST	Tries Coen Hess 1'; Hamiso Tabuai-Fidow 9'; Scott Drinkwater 12' Conversions; Jake Clifford 1'; Kyle Feldt 9'; Jake Clifford 12'		Tries Jaxson Paulo 16' Conversions; Lachlan Ilias 16'	Stadium: HBF Park

==== Semi-finals ====
15 February 2020	Parramatta Eels	6–8	St. George Illawarra Dragons	Perth, Western Australia
17:20 WST	Tries Jaeman Salmon 7' Conversions; Clint Gutherson 8'		Tries Mikaele Ravalawa 3'; Tim Lafai 17'	Stadium: HBF Park

15 February 2020	Gold Coast Titans	10–19	North Queensland Cowboys	Perth, Western Australia
17:45 WST	Tries Greg Leleisiuao 7'; Jai Whitbread 17' Conversions; Tyrone Peachey 17'		Tries Kyle Feldt 2'; Hamiso Tabuai-Fidow 11'; Shane Wright 13'; Scott Drinkwater 15' Conversions; Kyle Feldt 3'	Stadium: HBF Park

==== Grand Final ====
15 February 2020	St. George Illawarra Dragons	14–23	North Queensland Cowboys	Perth, Western Australia
19:00 WST	Tries Jason Nightingale 4'; Mikaele Ravalawa 6'; Josh Kerr 15' Conversions; Tristan Sailor 15'		Tries Coen Hess 1'; Reece Robson 7'; Jake Clifford 12'; Hamiso Tabuai-Fidow 16' Conversions; Dylan O'Connell 1'; Scott Drinkwater 7'	Stadium: HBF Park

== Women's tournament ==
=== Pool Stage ===
Women's Pool
Team	Pld	W	D	L	PF	PA	PD	Pts
Brisbane Broncos	3	3	0	0	54	10	+44	6
St. George Illawarra Dragons	3	1	0	2	48	34	+14	2
Sydney Roosters	3	1	0	2	22	42	−20	2
New Zealand Warriors	3	1	0	2	24	62	−38	2

14 February 2020	New Zealand Warriors	13–8	Sydney Roosters	Perth, Western Australia
16:05 WST	Tries Huia Harding 1'; Shontelle Stowers 16' Conversions; Kathleen Wharton 2'; Apii Nicholls 16'		Tries Zahara Temara 4'; Kiana Takairangi 9'	Stadium: HBF Park

14 February 2020	Brisbane Broncos	13–6	St. George Illawarra Dragons	Perth, Western Australia
19:55 WST	Tries Amber Hall 1'; Jessika Elliston 10' Conversions; Meg Ward 1'; Raecene McGregor 10'		Tries Jessica Sergis 11' Conversions; Maddie Studdon 12'	Stadium: HBF Park

15 February 2020	Sydney Roosters	0–16	Brisbane Broncos	Perth, Western Australia
10:20 WST			Tries Tamika Upton 6'; Tamika Upton 10'; Hayley Maddick 17' Conversions; Megan Ward 6'	Stadium: HBF Park

15 February 2020	New Zealand Warriors	7–29	St. George Illawarra Dragons	Perth, Western Australia
10:45 WST	Tries Apii Nicholls 7' Conversions; Amber Kani 8'		Tries Isabelle Kelly 0'; Keeley Davis 4'; Sam Bremner 10'; Brittany Breayley 15'; Botille Vette-Welsh 17' Conversions; Maddie Studdon 4'; Maddie Studdon 11'; Maddie Studdon 17'	Stadium: HBF Park

15 February 2020	Brisbane Broncos	25–4	New Zealand Warriors	Perth, Western Australia
16:20 WST	Tries Jayme Fressard 1'; Chelsea Lenarduzzi 8'; Jessika Elliston 10'; Jayme Fressard 14' Conversions; Ali Brigginshaw 9'; Meg Ward 11'; Meg Ward 14'		Tries Harata Butler 12'	Stadium: HBF Park

15 February 2020	St. George Illawarra Dragons	13–14	Sydney Roosters	Perth, Western Australia
16:45 WST	Tries Aaliyah Fasavalu-Fa'amausili 4'; Keeley Davis 5' Conversions; Maddie Studdon 4'; Maddie Studdon 6'		Tries Hannah Southwell 4'; Corban McGregor 11'; Zahara Temara 17' Penalty Goals; Zahara Temara 17'	Stadium: HBF Park

=== Grand Final ===
15 February 2020	Brisbane Broncos	4–28	St. George Illawarra Dragons	Perth, Western Australia
18:25 WST	Tries Jayme Fressard 13'		Tries Isabelle Kelly 1'; Aaliyah Fasavalu-Fa'amausili 6'; Kezie Apps 8'; Jessica Sergis 11'; Maddison Weatherall 16' Conversions; Maddie Studdon 6'; Maddie Studdon 9'; Maddie Studdon 16'	Stadium: HBF Park

== Team of the Tournament ==
=== Men ===
#	Player
1	Scott Drinkwater
2	Clint Gutherson
3	Mason Lino
4	Tyrone Peachey
5	Jason Taumalolo
6	Phillip Sami
7	Luke Metcalf
8	Cody Ramsey
9	Viliame Kikau

=== Women ===
#	Player
1	Maddie Studdon
2	Hannah Southwell
3	Sam Bremner
4	Raecene McGregor
5	Tamika Upton
6	Chelsea Lenarduzzi
7	Nita Maynard
8	Keeley Davis
9	Kezie Apps
