= Jayden Hodges =

Australian professional rugby player

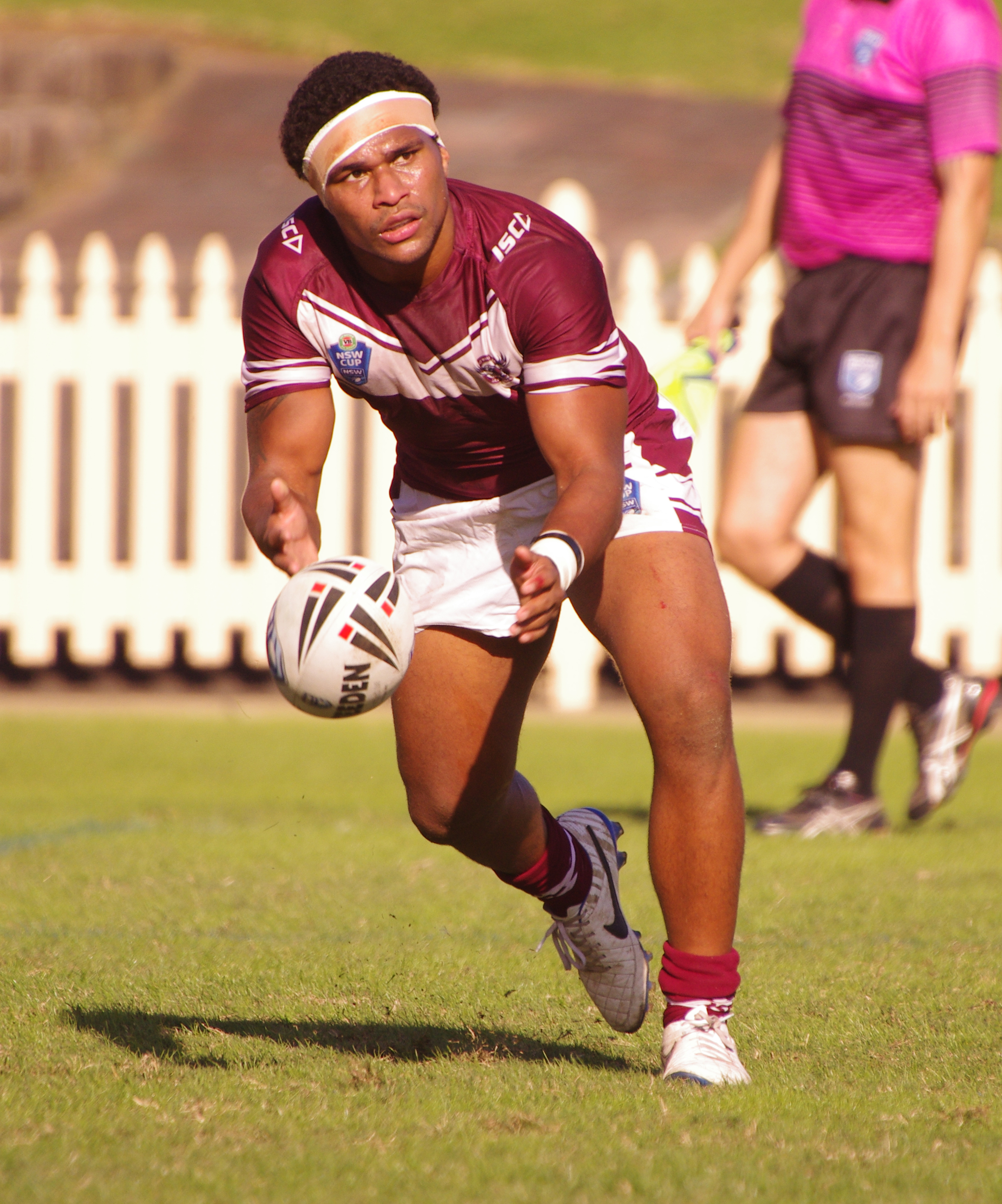

Personal information
- Born: 9 October 1993 (age 33) Cairns, Queensland, Australia
- Height: 180 cm (5 ft 11 in)
- Weight: 87 kg (13 st 10 lb)

Playing information
- Position: Hooker
Club
| Years | Team | Pld | T | G | FG | P |
|---|---|---|---|---|---|---|
| 2013 | North Qld Cowboys | 3 | 0 | 0 | 0 | 0 |
| 2014–15 | Manly Sea Eagles | 11 | 1 | 0 | 0 | 4 |
| | Total | 14 | 1 | 0 | 0 | 4 |
- Source: As of 6 September 2015
- Relatives: Justin Hodges (cousin)

Jayden Hodges (born 9 October 1993) is an Australian professional rugby league footballer who is the captain of the Townsville Blackhawks in the Queensland Cup. He primarily plays as a hooker.

== Background ==
Born in Cairns, Queensland, Hodges is an Indigenous Australian and played his junior football for the Cairns Kangaroos, before being signed by the North Queensland Cowboys.

Hodges is the cousin of former Brisbane Broncos player Justin Hodges.

== Playing career ==
=== Early career ===
In 2012 and 2013, Hodges played for the North Queensland Cowboys' NYC team. In August 2013, he signed a three-year contract with the Manly-Warringah Sea Eagles starting in 2014.

=== 2013 ===
In Round 25 of the 2013 NRL season, Hodges made his NRL debut for North Queensland against the Cronulla-Sutherland Sharks.

=== 2014 ===
In Round 17 of the 2014 NRL season, Hodges made his Manly Warringah debut against the Canterbury-Bankstown Bulldogs. After a season-ending injury to first grade hooker Matt Ballin against Penrith in Round 25, Hodges was called into the team for the final three games of the season, scoring his first NRL try in Manly's 17-18 sudden death Semi-final loss to Canterbury-Bankstown at the Sydney Football Stadium.

=== 2015 ===
Hodges spent the majority of 2015 playing for Manly's New South Wales Cup side. For his efforts he won the Bob Batty Best and Fairest Award for the New South Wales Cup side and was also named as the Players' Player. He also played in seven NRL games during the 2015 NRL season.

=== 2016 ===
Although Manly made the decision to release long-time first-grade hooker and dual premiership player Matt Ballin at the end of 2015, the club then signed former South Sydney premiership hooker Apisai Koroisau from Penrith and Ipswich Jets hooker Matt Parcell to three-year contracts with Hodges again facing the possibility of playing in the New South Wales Cup rather than the NRL. Hodges did gain selection to Manly's 2016 NRL Auckland Nines squad, but his tournament was ended when he was ruled out for the season after suffering a torn anterior cruciate ligament (ACL).

=== 2017 ===
Hodges signed with the Mackay Cutters who play in the Queensland Cup competition. He suffered a season-ending injury in his first match of the season, but played 43 more games for the Cutters between 2018 and 2020. Hodges played for the Cutters

=== 2021-2022 ===
In 2021 Hodges signed to the Northern Pride, where he was appointed joint co-captain with Chris Ostwald. He made 25 appearances for the Pride over the next two seasons, scoring four tries.

=== 2023-2026 ===
Hodges currently plays for the Townsville Blackhawks. He has scored 9 tries over the 4 years at the club, and also has 28 try assists during those years.
