= Stadium Mackay =

Football stadium in Queensland, Australia

BB Print Stadium Mackay
- Interactive map of BB Print Stadium Mackay
- Location: Cnr Casey Ave & Bridge Road, Mackay, Queensland
- Coordinates: 21°9′49″S 149°11′2″E
- Owner: Mackay Regional Council
- Capacity: 12,000
- Surface: Grass

Construction
- Groundbreaking: 2010
- Built: 2011
- Opened: 20 August 2011
- Cost: A$ 11.3 million
- Architect: Alan Griffith Architect

Tenants
- Mackay Cutters (QLD Cup) (2011–present); Whitsunday Miners (QSL) (2011–present); Canterbury-Bankstown Bulldogs (NRL) (2012–2013); Queensland County (National Rugby Championship) (2018)

Website
- http://www.mackay.qld.gov.au/community/council_facilities2/stadium_mackay

Stadium Mackay, currently known as its sponsored name BB Print Stadium Mackay, is a rectangular football stadium situated in Mackay, Queensland, Australia. The stadium is home to the Intrust Super Cup's Absolute Enterprises's Mackay Cutters and Queensland State League's Whitsunday Miners.

The 2016 to 2020 naming rights deal is the first time a local business has been given naming rights to the stadium and was one of the deciding factors by Mackay Regional Council and CAS Ltd (the board overseeing BB Print Stadium Mackay). BB Print Stadium Mackay was previously known as Virgin Stadium Australia.

== Stadium ==
The 12,200 capacity stadium was funded by the Australian Government at a cost of 11.3 million and opened on 20 August 2011 at a Mackay Cutters home game. The stadium consists of a western grandstand that can accommodate 2,000 people including 10 corporate boxes, 6 corporate suites and broadcast box. 2.5 million of the total 11.3 million cost of the stadium was spent on installing lighting that is of NRL and television standard so that the stadium could possible host regular season NRL matches. On 1 March 2016 it was announced that the grounds would be renamed to BB Print Stadium Mackay after BB Print purchased the naming rights to the stadium.

=== National Rugby League ===
On Sunday 24 June 2012, BB Print Stadium Mackay hosted its first NRL game when the 2nd placed Canterbury-Bankstown Bulldogs played a 'home' game at the venue against the ladder leading Melbourne Storm in Round 16 of the 2012 NRL season, the NRL's Women in League Round. In front of a ground record crowd of 11,876 the Bulldogs defeated the Storm 20–4 with Mackay product Ben Barba setting up one of the tries of the season for Bulldogs teammate Josh Morris. Barba fielded a Storm kick only one metre from the dead ball line, then evaded his opposition and ran 70 metres down field before centre kicking for Morris to score next to the posts for what was a 109-metre try.

The stadium hosted its second NRL game on 7 July 2013 when the Bulldogs hosted the Newcastle Knights in Round 17 of the 2013 NRL season.

In the 2021 NRL season, when all 16 NRL teams were moved to Queensland due to COVID-19 outbreaks in Sydney and Melbourne, the Round 20 match between the Sydney Roosters and the Parramatta Eels on July 29 was relocated to BB Print Stadium.

With matches also relocated to venues in Brisbane, Gold Coast, Sunshine Coast, Redcliffe and Rockhampton throughout the final weeks of the 2021 season, BB Print Stadium hosted a further two games, the New Zealand Warriors and Canberra Raiders game in Round 24 on 27 August 2021 and the match between the Canberra Raiders and the Sydney Roosters game on 2 September 2021 in Round 25.

The venue was additionally selected for the two semi-final games in the 2021 NRL Finals Series on 17 and 18 September 2021.

=== Other events ===
The stadium hosted a pre-season match between A-League clubs Brisbane Roar and Sydney FC on 16 September 2012.

On 15 September 2018 BB Print Stadium hosted professional Rugby Union, when Queensland Country defeated Fijian Drua 52–22 in a National Rugby Championship match in front of 1200 fans.

BB Print Stadium Mackay is home to the Intrust Super Cup's Absolute Enterprises Mackay Cutters, and has hosted the internationally televised Professional Bull Riders events, Nitro Circus and Monster Trucks along with the highly successful Kiss concert in 2013.
