= Mackay Cutters =

Australian rugby league club, based in Mackay, QLD

Club information
- Full name: Mackay Cutters Rugby League Football Club
- Colours: Primary: Maroon; Blue; Secondary: Blue; White
- Founded: 2007; 19 years ago
- Website: mackaycutters.com.au

Current details
- Ground: BB Print Stadium, Mackay, Queensland (12,200)
- Chairman: Steve Dowden
- Coach: Adam Cuthbertson
- Captain: Sean Mullany
- Competition: Hostplus Cup
- 2024 season: 10th
- Current season

Records
- Premierships (2nd grade): 1 (2013)
- Wooden spoons (2nd grade): 3 (2009, 2016, 2018)
- Most capped: 125 – Liam Taylor
- Highest points scorer: 843 – Liam Taylor

The Mackay Cutters are a semi-professional rugby league football club based in Mackay, Queensland. They compete in Queensland's top rugby league competition, the Queensland Cup. The club was admitted to the Queensland Cup in 2007, alongside the Northern Pride, and first competed in the 2008 season.

Since 2008, the club has appeared in two finals series, winning the Grand Final in 2013. The team's management headquarters and home ground, Stadium Mackay, currently known as BB Print Stadium due to sponsorship rights, is located in the suburb of South Mackay.

Along with the Pride and Townsville Blackhawks, the Cutters are affiliated with the National Rugby League's North Queensland Cowboys.

== History ==
Prior to the Cutters entry into the Queensland Cup in 2008, Mackay rugby league's only representation in the statewide competition was the Mackay Sea Eagles, who played in the inaugural season in 1996 before withdrawing from the competition. In September 2007, the Mackay Cutters and Northern Pride were granted provisional entry into the Queensland Cup for the 2008 season. On 7 December 2007, their entry into the competition was confirmed by the Queensland Rugby League.

Former North Queensland Cowboys and Parramatta Eels five-eighth Shane Muspratt was announced as captain-coach for the Cutters' inaugural season. Among the first recruits to the club were former Queensland State of Origin representative John Doyle, Jamie McDonald, Luke Young and Adam Schubert. Doyle would not play a game for the Cutters, retiring due to consistent knee injuries in January 2008.

The Cutters endured a rough two first seasons under Muspratt, finishing 9th in 2008 and last in 2009. The Cutters first ever game was a 16–44 loss to rivals the Northern Pride. Their first ever win came in Round 5, when they defeated the Redcliffe Dolphins 24–22 at Dolphin Oval. The 2009 season started strongly with three straight wins before a run of nine straight losses sunk them to the bottom of the table. They finished with the wooden spoon due to points differential.

In 2010, former Souths Logan Magpies and Queensland Residents coach Paul Bramley joined the club, leading the Cutters to the finals for the first time. They finished sixth, and eliminated the third-placed Sunshine Coast Sea Eagles before being knocked out by the Norths Devils, one game short of the Grand Final.

Bramley left the Cutters at the end of the 2010 season to join the Burleigh Bears and was replaced by Anthony Seibold, who led the South Wales Scorpions to promotion a year earlier. Former Cowboys and New Zealand Warriors halfback Grant Rovelli also joined the club permanently from the Cowboys and was named captain for the 2011 season. Also in 2011, after playing out of local junior rugby league grounds for three seasons, the Cutters moved to the newly built 12,200 seat Stadium Mackay. The first game at the new stadium was a 14–16 loss to the Easts Tigers in Round 20 of the 2011 season.

Under Seibold, the Cutters missed the finals in both 2011 and 2012, with Seibold leaving to coach the Melbourne Storm under-20 side in 2013.

In 2013, Kim Williams, a former Melbourne Storm SG Ball Cup coach, joined the club and led the Cutters' to their most successful season despite a number of difficult setbacks. On 28 April 2013, just hours after a 22–22 draw with the Tweed Heads Seagulls, Cowboys-contracted hooker Alex Elisala was found unconscious and not breathing after jumping from a hotel balcony. He died in hospital the following day. In honour of Elisala, the Cutters retired his number 14 jersey for the rest of the season. Despite the tragedy, the Cutters pushed forward and finished the season in second on the ladder. In Week 1 of the finals, they suffered a 18–31 loss to the Easts Tigers before bouncing back to defeat the Ipswich Jets and Northern Pride to qualify for their first Grand Final and set up a rematch with Easts.

On 28 September 2013, the Cutters defeated Easts 27–20 in the Grand Final at North Ipswich Reserve to claim their maiden Queensland Cup premiership. The side that day featured five contracted-Cowboys players; Michael Morgan, Kalifa Faifai Loa, Sam Hoare, Anthony Mitchell and Jason Taumalolo, with Mitchell winning the Duncan Hall Medal for man of the match.

The Cutters could not defend their premiership in 2014, losing six of their Grand Final winning side to NRL clubs and finishing in ninth place. In 2015, Williams final year as head coach, the club missed the finals once again, finishing in eighth. Following the 2015 season, Williams became the head coach of the Central Queensland Capras.

2016 proved to be a disastrous year for the Cutters, as they finished the season with their second wooden spoon. On 23 June 2016, new head coach David Simpson left the club after 14 games, in which the club won just one game. He was replaced by Jim Wilson, who served as interim head coach for the rest of the season. Despite the poor year, Cowboys-contracted hooker Josh Chudleigh became the first Cutters player to win the Courier Mail Medal for Queensland Cup Player of the Year and was named at hooker in the 2016 Team of the Year.

On 8 August 2016, North Queensland Cowboys under-20s assistant coach Steve Sheppard, was appointed as head coach of the Cutters on a two-year deal. During Sheppard's three seasons at the helm, the club failed to make the finals, finishing 8th in 2017, last in 2018 and 11th in 2019. On 30 August 2019, the club announced that Sheppard would leave the club at the end of the 2019 season.

On 3 October 2019, veteran NRL assistant coach Michael Crawley was announced as the new Cutters head coach, signing a two-year deal. He had previously worked as an assistant at the Canberra Raiders, North Queensland Cowboys and Newcastle Knights.

In August 2021, Crawley announced his departure from the club after two years, joining the Canberra Raiders, with Townsville Blackhawks U21s head coach Dave Elliott named as his replacement.

== Season summaries ==
P=Premiers, R=Runners-Up, M=Minor Premierships, F=Finals Appearance, W=Wooden Spoons (brackets represent finals games)
Competition	Games Played	Games Won	Games Drawn	Games Lost	Ladder Position	P	R	M	F	W	Coach	Captain(s)	Details
2008 Queensland Cup	20	7	1	12	9 / 11						Shane Muspratt	Shane Muspratt	2008 Mackay Cutters season
2009 Queensland Cup	22	7	1	14	12 / 12					♦	Shane Muspratt	Jardine Bobongie	2009 Mackay Cutters season
2010 Queensland Cup	22 (2)	11 (1)	1	10 (1)	6 / 12				♦		Paul Bramley	Jardine Bobongie	2010 Mackay Cutters season
2011 Queensland Cup	22	8	1	13	9 / 12						Anthony Seibold	Grant Rovelli	2011 Mackay Cutters season
2012 Queensland Cup	22	10	0	12	8 / 12						Anthony Seibold	Grant Rovelli	2012 Mackay Cutters season
2013 Queensland Cup	22 (4)	14 (3)	2	6 (1)	2 / 12	♦			♦		Kim Williams	Jardine Bobongie, Joel Clinton	2013 Mackay Cutters season
2014 Queensland Cup	24	11	0	13	9 / 13						Kim Williams	Tyson Martin	2014 Mackay Cutters season
2015 Queensland Cup	23	10	1	12	8 / 14						Kim Williams	Chris Gesch, Liam Taylor	2015 Mackay Cutters season
2016 Queensland Cup	23	4	1	18	14 / 14					♦	David Simpson / Jim Wilson	Brenden Treston	2016 Mackay Cutters season
2017 Queensland Cup	23	10	2	11	8 / 14						Steve Sheppard	Andrew Davey, Setaimata Sa	2017 Mackay Cutters season
2018 Queensland Cup	23	4	1	18	14 / 14					♦	Steve Sheppard	Tom Murphy	2018 Mackay Cutters season
2019 Queensland Cup	23	7	0	16	11 / 14						Steve Sheppard	Cooper Bambling	2019 Mackay Cutters season
2020 Queensland Cup	1	0	0	1	N/A						Michael Crawley	Jayden Hodges	2020 Mackay Cutters season
2021 Queensland Cup	17	4	0	13	12 / 14						Michael Crawley	Ross Bella	2021 Mackay Cutters season
2022 Queensland Cup	19	8	0	11	11 / 14								2022 Mackay Cutters season
2023 Queensland Cup	20	3	0	17	14 / 15								
2024 Queensland Cup	20	8	0	12	12 / 15								
2025 Queensland Cup	20	7	0	13	12 / 15								

== Coaches ==
Original Mackay Cutters logo

The Cutters' current coach, Adam Cuthbertson, is their 11th in club history. Kim Williams is their longest serving and most successful coach.

No	Coach	Tenure	Matches	Won	Drawn	Lost	Win %
1	Shane Muspratt	2008–2009	42	14	2	26	33.3%
2	Paul Bramley	2010	24	12	1	11	50%
3	Anthony Seibold	2011–2012	44	18	1	25	40.9%
4	Kim Williams	2013–2015	73	38	3	32	52.1%
5	David Simpson	2016	14	1	1	12	7.1%
6	Jim Wilson	2016	9	3	0	6	33.3%
7	Steve Sheppard	2017–2019	69	21	3	45	30.4%
8	Michael Crawley	2020–2021	18	4	0	14	22.2%
9	Dave Elliott	2022–2022	15	6	0	9	40%
10	Michael Comerford	2023-2024	40	10	4	26	25%
11	Adam Cuthbertson	Present	0	0	0	0	

== Emblems and colours ==
On 2 November 2007, the Daily Mercury unveiled the Cutters logo after holding a promotion inviting people to submit designs for the club's first crest. The winning design was submitted by Ashley Hanson of Townsville and was selected by Cutters' management from over 50 submissions.

== Honours ==
- Premierships: 1

2013

== Statistics and Records ==
Biggest Wins

Margin	Opponent	Score	Venue	Date
48	Norths Devils	52–4	Bishop Park	25 June 2017
42	Burleigh Bears	46–4	Stadium Mackay	18 July 2015
40	Ipswich Jets	52–12	North Ipswich Reserve	26 March 2022

Biggest Losses

Margin	Opponent	Score	Venue	Date
54	Ipswich Jets	0–54	BB Print Stadium	6 July 2018
52	Ipswich Jets	10–62	North Ipswich Reserve	2 August 2014
50	Souths Logan Magpies	10–60	BB Print Stadium	24 April 2022

Most Consecutive Wins

- 6, 2 August 2008 – 28 March 2009
- 5, 14 March 2015 – 11 April 2015
- 5, 22 May 2010 – 19 June 2010

Most Consecutive Losses

- 10, 20 May 2018 – 29 July 2018
- 9, 29 August 2015 – 24 April 2016
- 9, 18 April 2009 – 20 June 2019

Most Games for Club

- 125, Liam Taylor (2011–2016)
- 111, Jardine Bobongie (2009–2013, 2018)
- 96, Tyson Martin (2010–2016, 2018)
- 85, Chris Gesch (2013–2015)
- 84, Chris Giumelli (2008–2011)

Most Tries for Club

- 52, Liam Taylor (2011–2016)
- 31, Bureta Faraimo (2011–2013)
- 30, Yamba Bowie (2017–present)
- 26, Jordan Pereira (2015–2017)
- 24, Jardine Bobongie (2009–2013, 2018)

Most tries in a match

- 3, Brenton Baira against Wynnum Manly Seagulls at Ray Edwards Oval (23 July 2022)
- 3, Blake Paskins against Northern Pride at BB Print Stadium (3 April 2022)
- 3, Jayden Batchelor against Redcliffe Dolphins at BB Print Stadium (25 May 2019)
- 3, Nathan Saumalu against CQ Capras at Browne Park (8 April 2017)
- 3, Cameron Cullen against Easts Tigers at Stadium Mackay (28 March 2015)
- 3, David Milne against Norths Devils at Green Energy Sports Park (3 August 2013)
- 3, Jason Taumalolo against Souths Logan Magpies at Davies Park (19 May 2013)
- 3, Michael Thomas against CQ Capras at Virgin Australia Stadium (27 April 2012)
- 3, Quinton Fielder against Central Comets at Browne Park (9 August 2008)

Most Goals in a Match

- 8, Brandon Finnegan against Ipswich Jets at North Ipswich Reserve (26 March 2022)

Most Points in a Match

- 22, (2 tries, 7 goals), Justin Hunt against Easts Tigers at Langlands Park (12 June 2010)

Most Tries in a Season

- 17, Bureta Faraimo in 2013
- 16, Josh Chudleigh in 2016
- 16, David Milne in 2013

Most Points in a Season

- 170 (11 tries, 63 goals), Liam Taylor in 2013
- 164 (12 tries, 58 goals), Liam Taylor in 2016
- 156 (13 tries, 52 goals), Liam Taylor in 2014

== See also ==
- North Queensland Cowboys
- National Rugby League reserves affiliations
