= List of New Zealand Warriors players =

This article lists all rugby league footballers who have played first-grade for the New Zealand Warriors in the National Rugby League.

Notes:

- Debut:
  - Players are listed in the order of their debut game with the club.
  - Dean Bell was awarded cap number one as the club's inaugural captain. The club's inaugural matchday line-up is otherwise ordered by position.
- Appearances: New Zealand Warriors games only, not a total of their career games. For example, Nathan Fien has played a career total of 276 first-grade games, but of those 105 were at the Warriors.
- Previous Club: refers to the previous first-grade rugby league club (NRL or Super League) the player played at.
- The statistics in this table are correct as of the end of the 2024 NRL season.

== List of players ==
=== Men ===
Cap no.	Name	Debut round	Career span	Previous club	Appearances	Tries	Goals	Field goals	Points
1	Dean Bell	Rd. 1	1995	Wigan Warriors	19	3	0	0	12
2	Phil Blake	Rd. 1	1995–97	St. George Dragons	37	17	0	0	68
3	Sean Hoppe†	Rd. 1	1995–99	North Sydney Bears	88	44	0	0	176
4	Manoa Thompson	Rd. 1	1995	Western Suburbs Magpies	7	0	0	0	0
5	Whetu Taewa	Rd. 1	1995	Counties Manukau	11	1	0	0	4
6	Gene Ngamu†	Rd. 1	1995–99	South Sydney Rabbitohs	81	11	118	3	283
7	Greg Alexander	Rd. 1	1995–96	Penrith Panthers	37	11	8	0	60
8	Gavin Hill	Rd. 1	1995–96	Waikato Cougars	14	0	9	0	18
9	Duane Mann	Rd. 1	1995	North Harbour Sea Eagles	13	3	0	0	12
10	Hitro Okesene	Rd. 1	1995–97	Counties Manukau	22	2	0	0	8
11	Stephen Kearney†	Rd. 1	1995–98	Western Suburbs Magpies	79	11	0	0	44
12	Tony Tatupu*	Rd. 1	1995–96, 1998–99	North Harbour Sea Eagles	67	10	0	0	40
13	Tony Tuimavave†	Rd. 1	1995-00	Waitakere City Raiders	77	9	0	0	36
14	Se'e Solomona	Rd. 1	1995	Oldham	9	0	0	0	0
15	Tea Ropati†	Rd. 1	1995–98	St. Helens	72	26	0	0	104
16	Jason Mackie	Rd. 1	1995	Auckland City Vulcans	5	0	0	0	0
17	Martin Moana	Rd. 1	1995	Waikato Cougars	6	1	0	0	4
18	Joe Vagana†	Rd. 2	1995–00	North Harbour Sea Eagles	116	9	0	0	36
19	Syd Eru†	Rd. 3	1995–99	Wellington	59	15	0	0	60
20	Willie Poching	Rd. 3	1995	Brisbane Broncos	2	1	0	0	4
21	Logan Edwards	Rd. 5	1995	Canterbury Country Cardinals	15	1	0	0	4
22	John Kirwan	Rd. 5	1995–96	Auckland (RU)	35	13	0	0	52
23	Stacey Jones*†	Rd. 7	1995–05, 2009	Auckland City Vulcans	261	77	176	14	674
24	Andy Platt	Rd. 7	1995–96	Wigan Warriors	35	0	0	0	0
25	Mike Dorreen	Rd. 9	1995	Hawkes Bay Unicorns	4	2	0	0	8
26	Richie Blackmore*	Rd. 10	1995–96, 2001	Castleford Tigers	35	13	0	0	52
27	Frano Botica	Rd. 11	1995	Wigan Warriors	5	2	19	0	46
28	Denis Betts†	Rd. 11	1995–97	Wigan Warriors	42	11	0	0	44
29	Marc Ellis†	Rd. 2	1996–98	Otago (RU)	36	11	29	1	103
30	Mark Horo†	Rd. 2	1996–97	Western Suburbs Magpies	36	4	0	0	16
31	Mark Carter	Rd. 2	1996	Auckland (RU)	8	0	0	0	0
32	Nigel Vagana*	Rd. 3	1996, 1998–00	Richmond Bulldogs	71	37	0	0	148
33	Awen Guttenbeil†	Rd. 4	1996-06	Manly Sea Eagles	170	15	0	0	60
34	Doc Murray	Rd. 5	1996	Auckland City Vulcans	1	0	0	0	0
35	Iva Ropati	Rd. 5	1996–97	Parramatta Eels	7	3	0	0	12
36	Anthony Swann†	Rd. 12	1996–98	Marist Saints	36	6	0	0	24
37	Brady Malam†	Rd. 12	1996–99	Glenora Bears	55	0	0	0	0
38	Bryan Henare	Rd. 15	1996–99	Otahuhu Leopards	22	3	0	0	12
39	Aaron Lester	Rd. 17	1996	Auckland City Vulcans	3	0	0	0	0
40	Matthew Ridge†	Rd. 1	1997–99	Manly Sea Eagles	37	8	103	0	238
41	Grant Young	Rd. 1	1997	South Queensland Crushers	9	0	0	0	0
42	Logan Swann*†	Rd. 1	1997–03, 2007–08	Ellerslie Eagles	195	36	1	0	146
43	Steve Buckingham	Rd. 3	1997	Mt Albert Lions	2	0	0	0	0
44	Shane Endacott†	Rd. 5	1997–99	Canterbury Country Cardinals	42	3	0	0	12
45	Paul Staladi†	Rd. 9	1997–98	Mt Albert Lions	15	3	0	0	12
46	Meti Noovao	Rd. 12	1997	Auckland City Vulcans	1	0	0	0	0
47	Lee Oudenryn†	Rd. 14	1997–00	Gold Coast Seagulls	61	23	1	0	94
48	Aaron Whittaker	Rd. 15	1997–98	Wakefield Trinity	9	1	1	1	7
49	David Bailey	Rd. 16	1997	Waitakere City Raiders	3	1	0	0	4
50	Jerry Seuseu	Rd. 17	1997–04	Counties Manukau	132	10	0	0	40
51	Kevin Iro	Rd. 1	1998	Hunter Mariners	16	2	0	0	8
52	Quentin Pongia	Rd. 1	1998	Canberra Raiders	18	0	0	0	0
53	Tyran Smith	Rd. 1	1998	North Queensland Cowboys	10	1	0	0	4
54	Zane Clark	Rd. 1	1998	Randwick Kingfishers	5	0	0	0	0
55	Ali Lauiti'iti*	Rd. 6	1998–04	Mangere East Hawks	115	33	0	0	132
56	Joe Galuvao	Rd. 8	1998–00	Manurewa Marlins	26	4	0	0	16
57	Frank Watene	Rd. 24	1998	Otahuhu Leopards	1	0	0	0	0
58	Odell Manuel	Rd. 1	1999–00	Otahuhu Leopards	40	13	0	0	52
59	Jason Death	Rd. 1	1999–01	North Queensland Cowboys	56	11	0	0	44
60	Terry Hermansson	Rd. 1	1999–00	South Sydney Rabbitohs	39	1	0	0	4
61	Monty Betham	Rd. 1	1999–05	Bay Roskill Vikings	101	10	0	0	40
62	Cliff Beverley	Rd. 3	1999–01	Glenora Bears	43	8	0	0	32
63	Peter Lewis	Rd. 5	1999	Upper Hutt	11	1	0	0	4
64	Wairangi Koopu	Rd. 6	1999–08	Taniwharau	159	34	0	0	136
65	Francis Meli	Rd. 9	1999–05	Marist Saints	110	60	0	0	240
66	Clinton Toopi	Rd. 9	1999–06	Otahuhu Leopards	129	57	0	0	228
67	Carl Doherty	Rd. 9	1999	Glenora Bears	5	0	14	0	28
68	Robbie Mears	Rd. 11	1999–00	Bulldogs	40	10	0	0	40
69	John Simon	Rd. 15	1999–00	Parramatta Eels	32	2	51	0	110
70	Boycie Nelson	Rd. 16	1999	Widnes Vikings	5	1	0	0	4
71	Talite Liavaʻa	Rd. 18	1999–00	Balmain Tigers	11	0	0	0	0
72	Scott Pethybridge	Rd. 1	2000	North Sydney Bears	14	0	1	0	2
73	Ivan Cleary	Rd. 1	2000–02	Sydney Roosters	53	12	195	1	439
74	Matthew Spence	Rd. 1	2000	Western Suburbs Magpies	18	3	0	0	12
75	Scott Coxon	Rd. 1	2000	Western Suburbs Magpies	12	1	0	0	4
76	Mark Tookey	Rd. 1	2000–04	Parramatta Eels	67	9	0	0	36
77	David Myles	Rd. 2	2000–02	Cronulla Sharks	40	5	0	0	20
78	Paul Whatuira	Rd. 2	2000	Wainuiomata Lions	5	0	0	0	0
79	Ben Lythe	Rd. 4	2000	Burleigh Bears	5	0	4	0	8
80	Shontayne Hape	Rd. 7	2000–02	Te Atatu Roosters	28	7	0	0	28
81	Henry Fa'afili	Rd. 8	2000–04	Manurewa Marlins	94	38	0	0	152
82	Jason Bell	Rd. 15	2000	Parramatta Eels	8	0	0	0	0
83	David Mulhall	Rd. 20	2000	Brisbane Souths	3	0	1	0	2
84	Jonathan Smith	Rd. 21	2000–01	Mangere East Hawks	7	0	0	0	0
85	Henry Perenara	Rd. 21	2000	Glenora Bears	3	0	0	0	0
86	Kevin Campion	Rd. 1	2001–02	Brisbane Broncos	44	3	0	0	12
87	Richard Villasanti	Rd. 1	2001–06	Wests Tigers	96	21	0	0	84
88	Justin Morgan	Rd. 2	2001–02	Canberra Raiders	28	3	0	0	12
89	Jason Temu	Rd. 3	2001	Newcastle Knights	4	0	0	0	0
90	Motu Tony	Rd. 4	2001–03	Marist Richmond Brothers	55	23	0	0	92
91	Nathan Wood	Rd. 6	2001	Sydney Roosters	17	1	0	0	4
92	Justin Murphy	Rd. 8	2001–04	Bulldogs	43	10	0	0	40
93	Iafeta Paleaaesina	Rd. 15	2001–05	Hibiscus Coast Raiders	83	8	0	0	32
94	Anthony Seuseu	Rd. 19	2001	Hibiscus Coast Raiders	1	0	0	0	0
95	John Carlaw	Rd. 2	2002–03	Wests Tigers	35	10	0	0	40
96	PJ Marsh	Rd. 2	2002–04	Parramatta Eels	35	5	12	1	45
97	Brent Webb	Rd. 3	2002–06	Brisbane Wests	103	39	27	0	210
98	Sione Faumuina	Rd. 3	2002–06	Canberra Raiders	88	18	33	0	138
99	Lance Hohaia	Rd. 4	2002–11	Taniwharau Rugby League	185	57	64	1	357
100	Vinnie Anderson	Rd. 17	2002–04	Mt Albert Lions	55	13	0	0	52
101	Jeremiah Pai	Rd. 19	2002	Eastern Tornadoes	2	0	0	0	0
102	Evarn Tuimavave	Rd. 25	2002–09	Marist Richmond Brothers	105	9	1	0	38
103	Karl Temata	Rd. 26	2002–05	Hibiscus Coast Raiders	52	2	0	0	8
104	Mark Robinson	Rd. 8	2003	North Harbour (RU)	1	0	0	0	0
105	Thomas Leuluai*	Rd. 8	2003–04, 2013–16	Otahuhu Leopards	86	12	0	0	48
106	Vince Mellars	Rd. 13	2003–04	Wainuiomata Lions	7	1	0	0	4
107	Tevita Leo-Latu	Rd. 13	2003–05	Marist Richmond Brothers	22	3	0	0	12
108	Jerome Ropati	Rd. 25	2003–14	Marist Richmond Brothers	145	54	0	0	216
109	Tony Martin	Rd. 1	2004–07	London	53	13	109	0	270
110	Epalahame Lauaki	Rd. 1	2004–08	Glenora Bears	69	10	0	0	40
111	Danny Sullivan	Rd. 3	2004	Parramatta Eels	1	0	0	0	0
112	Louis Anderson	Rd. 3	2004–07	East Coast Bays Barracudas	67	7	0	0	28
113	Matt Jobson	Rd. 4	2004	Newcastle Knights	2	0	0	0	0
114	Paul Dezolt	Rd. 9	2004	North Queensland Cowboys	3	0	0	0	0
115	Manu Vatuvei	Rd. 11	2004–17	Otahuhu Leopards	226	152	0	0	608
116	Shannon Stowers	Rd. 15	2004	Hibiscus Coast Raiders	2	0	0	0	0
117	Herewini Rangi	Rd. 20	2004	Eastern Tornadoes	1	0	0	0	0
118	Cooper Vuna	Rd. 24	2004–06	Otahuhu Leopards	5	1	0	0	4
119	Kane Ferris	Rd. 25	2004	Canterbury Bulls	1	0	0	0	0
120	Paul Atkins	Rd. 25	2004	Tamaki Leopards	1	0	0	0	0
121	Steve Price	Rd. 1	2005–10	Bulldogs	91	13	0	0	52
122	Todd Byrne	Rd. 1	2005–07	Sydney Roosters	43	21	0	0	84
123	Ruben Wiki	Rd. 1	2005–08	Canberra Raiders	87	12	0	0	48
124	Nathan Fien	Rd. 1	2005–09	North Queensland Cowboys	105	17	0	0	68
125	Simon Mannering	Rd. 16	2005–18	Wellington Orcas	301	63	0	0	252
126	Micheal Luck	Rd. 1	2006–12	North Queensland Cowboys	150	7	0	0	28
127	Grant Rovelli	Rd. 1	2006–08	Sydney Roosters	68	15	0	0	60
128	George Gatis	Rd. 3	2006–07	North Queensland Cowboys	39	6	0	0	24
129	Patrick Ah Van	Rd. 5	2006–10	Mt Albert Lions	54	16	5	0	74
130	Misi Taulapapa	Rd. 7	2006	Marist Richmond Brothers	5	0	0	0	0
131	Sam Rapira	Rd. 11	2006–15	Waicoa Bay Stallions	173	14	0	0	56
132	Wade McKinnon	Rd. 1	2007–10	Parramatta Eels	54	16	0	0	64
133	Michael Crockett	Rd. 1	2007–08	Wests Tigers	20	11	0	0	44
134	Michael Witt	Rd. 1	2007–09	Manly Sea Eagles	43	12	121	1	291
135	Corey Lawrie	Rd. 5	2007	Canterbury Bulls	4	0	0	0	0
136	Aidan Kirk	Rd. 1	2008–09	Sydney Roosters	20	8	0	0	32
137	Brent Tate	Rd. 1	2008–10	Brisbane Broncos	48	12	0	0	48
138	Sonny Fai	Rd. 2	2008	Counties Manukau	15	5	0	0	20
139	Ian Henderson	Rd. 2	2008–10	Bradford Bulls	65	8	0	0	32
140	Ryan Shortland	Rd. 4	2008	Melbourne Storm	5	3	0	0	12
141	Russell Packer	Rd. 8	2008–13	Central Falcons	110	6	0	0	24
142	Ben Matulino	Rd. 14	2008–17	Wellington Orcas	212	17	0	0	72
143	Malo Solomona	Rd. 16	2008	Richmond Bulldogs	8	3	0	0	12
144	Denan Kemp	Rd. 1	2009	Brisbane Broncos	10	1	21	0	46
145	Joel Moon	Rd. 1	2009–11	Brisbane Broncos	51	15	0	0	60
146	Jacob Lillyman	Rd. 1	2009–17	North Queensland Cowboys	188	6	0	0	24
147	Leeson Ah Mau*	Rd. 1	2009, 2019–21	Otahuhu Leopards	46	1	0	0	4
148	Jesse Royal	Rd. 2	2009–10	Newcastle Knights	36	2	0	0	8
149	Ukuma Taʻai	Rd. 2	2009–12	Mt Albert Lions	52	7	0	0	28
150	Daniel O'Regan	Rd. 4	2009	Mt Albert Lions	1	0	0	0	0
151	Lewis Brown	Rd. 8	2009–12	Wests Tigers	84	19	0	0	76
152	Kevin Locke	Rd. 12	2009–14	Northcote Tigers	89	26	24	0	152
153	Aaron Heremaia	Rd. 12	2009–11	Manurewa Marlins	60	5	0	0	20
154	Isaac John	Rd. 19	2009–11	Waicoa Bay Stallions	9	1	0	1	5
155	Siuatonga Likiliki	Rd. 23	2009–10	Marist Saints	1	0	0	0	0
156	James Maloney	Rd. 1	2010–12	Melbourne Storm	75	24	222	7	547
157	Brett Seymour	Rd. 1	2010–11	Cronulla Sharks	22	2	10	0	26
158	Jeremy Latimore	Rd. 1	2010–11	Parramatta Eels	24	2	0	0	8
159	Sione Lousi	Rd. 1	2010–16	Richmond	50	3	0	0	12
160	Bill Tupou	Rd. 4	2010–13	Marist Saints	62	19	0	0	76
161	Mataupu Poching	Rd. 10	2010–11	Mangere East Hawks	1	0	0	0	0
162	Alehana Mara	Rd. 24	2010–13	Wellington Orcas	16	0	0	0	0
163	Glen Fisiiahi	Rd. 1	2011–15	Ellerslie Eagles	25	15	0	0	60
164	Feleti Mateo	Rd. 1	2011–14	Parramatta Eels	95	10	2	0	44
165	Shaun Berrigan	Rd. 1	2011	Hull F.C.	19	6	0	0	24
166	Krisnan Inu	Rd. 2	2011–12	Parramatta Eels	21	12	0	0	48
167	Elijah Taylor	Rd. 4	2011–13	Tamaki Titans	67	14	0	0	56
168	Shaun Johnson*	Rd. 13	2011–18, 2022–24	Hibiscus Coast Raiders	224	79	440	17	1213
169	Steve Rapira	Rd. 13	2011–13	North Queensland Cowboys	14	0	0	0	0
170	Pita Godinet	Rd. 20	2011–13	Auckland Vulcans	18	4	0	0	16
171	Nathan Friend	Rd. 1	2012–15	Gold Coast Titans	86	7	0	0	28
172	Konrad Hurrell	Rd. 1	2012–16	Auckland Grammar (RU)	71	41	0	0	164
173	Ben Henry	Rd. 1	2012–16	Bay Roskill Vikings	52	16	2	0	68
174	Omar Slaimankhel	Rd. 15	2012	Auckland Grammar (RU)	5	0	0	0	0
175	Sam Lousi	Rd. 20	2012–14	Richmond Rovers	3	0	0	0	0
176	Sebastine Ikahihifo	Rd. 21	2012–15	Mangere East Hawks	39	1	0	0	4
177	Carlos Tuimavave	Rd. 22	2012–14	Mount Wellington Warriors	9	2	0	0	8
178	Dane Nielsen	Rd. 1	2013–14	Melbourne Storm	30	2	0	0	8
179	Todd Lowrie	Rd. 1	2013	Melbourne Storm	21	0	0	0	0
180	Ngani Laumape	Rd. 3	2013–15	Palmerston North Boys' High School (RU)	30	11	0	0	44
181	Suaia Matagi	Rd. 9	2013–15	Te Atatu Roosters	36	1	0	0	4
182	Dominique Peyroux	Rd. 12	2013–15	Gold Coast Titans	25	2	0	0	8
183	Charlie Gubb	Rd. 17	2013–17	Wynnum Manly Seagulls	40	1	0	0	4
184	Sio Siua Taukeiaho	Rd. 26	2013	Otara Scorpions	1	0	0	0	0
185	Sam Tomkins	Rd. 1	2014–15	Wigan Warriors	37	14	0	0	56
186	Chad Townsend*	Rd. 1	2014–15, 2021	Cronulla-Sutherland Sharks	46	5	17	1	55
187	Jayson Bukuya	Rd. 1	2014	Cronulla-Sutherland Sharks	18	2	0	0	8
188	John Palavi	Rd. 1	2014–16	Richmond Rovers	5	0	0	0	0
189	David Fusitu'a	Rd. 1	2014–21	Marist Saints	108	61	0	0	244
190	Siliva Havili	Rd. 6	2014–15	Manurewa Marlins	14	0	0	0	0
191	Agnatius Paasi*	Rd. 19	2014, 2018–20	Mangere East Hawks	53	7	0	0	28
192	Tuimoala Lolohea	Rd. 20	2014–17	Marist Saints	52	17	18	0	104
193	Solomone Kata	Rd. 1	2015–19	Sacred Heart College (RU)	93	46	0	0	184
194	Bodene Thompson	Rd. 1	2015–17	Wests Tigers	58	18	0	0	72
195	Ryan Hoffman	Rd. 1	2015–17	Melbourne Storm	60	11	1	0	46
196	Sam Lisone	Rd. 1	2015–19	Otahuhu Leopards	86	3	0	0	12
197	Albert Vete	Rd. 1	2015–18	St Kentigern College (RU)	47	4	0	0	16
198	Jonathan Wright	Rd. 2	2015–16	Cronulla Sharks	29	8	0	0	32
199	Matthew Allwood	Rd. 4	2015–17	Canberra Raiders	7	4	0	0	16
200	Raymond Faitala-Mariner	Rd. 8	2015–16	Otahuhu Leopards	12	1	0	0	4
201	Ken Maumalo	Rd. 10	2015–21	Papatoetoe Panthers	106	44	0	0	176
202	Mason Lino	Rd. 24	2015–18	Marist Saints	17	3	16	0	44
203	Roger Tuivasa-Sheck*	Rd. 1	2016–21, 2024–	Sydney Roosters	129	35	1	0	142
204	Blake Ayshford	Rd. 1	2016–19	Wests Tigers	49	13	0	0	52
205	Jeff Robson	Rd. 1	2016	Cronulla Sharks	7	1	0	0	4
206	Issac Luke	Rd. 1	2016–19	South Sydney Rabbitohs	83	14	69	0	194
207	Nathaniel Roache	Rd. 1	2016–19	Richmond Rovers	26	2	0	0	8
208	James Gavet	Rd. 1	2016–18	Brisbane Broncos	42	2	0	0	8
209	Jazz Tevaga	Rd. 3	2016–24	Papakura Sea Eagles	138	9	0	0	36
210	Ligi Sao	Rd. 7	2016–19	Manly Sea Eagles	26	1	0	0	4
211	Shaun Lane	Rd. 9	2016	Bulldogs	1	0	0	0	0
212	Toafofoa Sipley	Rd. 9	2016	Point Chevalier Pirates	2	0	0	0	0
213	Bunty Afoa	Rd. 17	2016–	Point Chevalier Pirates	138	8	0	0	32
214	Ata Hingano	Rd. 24	2016–17	Pakuranga Jaguars	15	1	1	0	6
215	Isaiah Papali'i	Rd. 1	2017–20	Te Atatu Roosters	63	7	0	0	28
216	Erin Clark*	Rd. 2	2017; 2025-	Point Chevalier Pirates	1	0	0	0	0
217	Kieran Foran	Rd. 5	2017	Parramatta Eels	17	2	0	0	8
218	Charnze Nicoll-Klokstad*	Rd. 9	2017, 2023–	Debut	47	20	0	0	80
219	Chris Satae	Rd. 20	2017–19	Point Chevalier Pirates	15	0	0	0	0
220	James Bell	Rd. 21	2017	Papakura Sea Eagles	2	0	0	0	0
221	Peta Hiku	Rd. 1	2018–21	Penrith Panthers	73	20	0	0	80
222	Blake Green	Rd. 1	2018–20	Manly Sea Eagles	55	4	0	1	17
223	Adam Blair	Rd. 1	2018–20	Brisbane Broncos	65	3	0	0	12
224	Tohu Harris	Rd. 1	2018–2024	Melbourne Storm	117	12	0	0	48
225	Sam Cook	Rd. 1	2018	Northcote Tigers	2	0	0	0	0
226	Leivaha Pulu	Rd. 1	2018–19	Gold Coast Titans	13	1	0	0	4
227	Anthony Gelling	Rd. 4	2018	Wigan Warriors	7	2	0	0	8
228	Joseph Vuna	Rd. 8	2018	Debut	4	0	0	0	0
229	Karl Lawton	Rd. 9	2018–20	Gold Coast Titans	32	6	0	0	24
230	Gerard Beale	Rd. 11	2018–20	Cronulla Sharks	32	4	0	0	16
231	Adam Keighran	Rd. 1	2019–20	Debut	9	4	9	0	34
232	Lachlan Burr	Rd. 1	2019–20	Gold Coast Titans	37	1	0	0	4
233	Chanel Harris-Tavita*	Rd. 4	2019–22; 2024–	Debut	71	11	63	1	171
234	Patrick Herbert	Rd. 7	2019–20	Debut	21	10	18	0	76
235	Hayze Perham	Rd. 7	2019–20	Debut	9	1	0	0	4
236	Kodi Nikorima	Rd. 9	2019–22	Brisbane Broncos	59	11	60	1	165
237	Adam Pompey	Rd. 18	2019–	Debut	95	23	45	0	182
238	Joshua Curran	Rd. 20	2019–23	Sydney Roosters	53	12	0	0	48
239	Taane Milne	Rd. 25	2019	St. George Illawarra	1	0	0	0	0
240	Wayde Egan	Rd. 1	2020–	Penrith Panthers	100	16	0	0	64
241	Jamayne Taunoa-Brown	Rd. 1	2020–21	Debut	32	1	0	0	4
242	Eliesa Katoa	Rd. 1	2020–22	Debut	46	10	0	0	40
243	King Vuniyayawa	Rd. 1	2020	Debut	5	0	0	0	0
244	Jack Murchie	Rd. 3	2020–22	Canberra Raiders	37	7	0	0	28
245	Poasa Faamausili	Rd. 4	2020	Sydney Roosters	4	0	0	0	0
246	Jack Hetherington	Rd. 8	2020	Penrith Panthers	6	0	0	0	0
247	George Jennings	Rd. 12	2020	Parramatta Eels	6	2	0	0	8
248	Daniel Alvaro	Rd. 12	2020	Parramatta Eels	6	0	0	0	0
249	Paul Turner	Rd. 15	2020–21	Debut	3	1	0	0	4
250	Tom Ale	Rd. 19	2020–	Debut	42	1	0	0	4
251	Euan Aitken	Rd. 1	2021–22	St. George Illawarra Dragons	35	10	0	0	40
252	Addin Fonua-Blake	Rd. 1	2021–24	Manly Sea Eagles	85	19	0	0	76
253	Bayley Sironen	Rd. 1	2021–23	South Sydney Rabbitohs	57	4	0	0	16
254	Ben Murdoch-Masila	Rd. 1	2021–22	Warrington Wolves	27	6	0	0	24
255	Sean O'Sullivan	Rd. 3	2021	Brisbane Broncos	12	2	0	0	8
256	Marcelo Montoya	Rd. 4	2021–2024	Bulldogs	82	30	0	0	120
257	Kane Evans	Rd. 5	2021	Parramatta Eels	13	0	0	0	0
258	Rocco Berry	Rd. 7	2021–	Debut	43	10	0	0	40
259	Reece Walsh	Rd. 7	2021–22	Debut	38	11	69	0	182
260	Edward Kosi	Rd. 8	2021–	Debut	32	17	0	0	68
261	Taniela Otukolo	Rd. 15	2021–22	Debut	9	0	0	0	0
262	Dallin Watene-Zelezniak	Rd. 16	2021–	Bulldogs	69	52	0	0	208
263	Matthew Lodge	Rd. 17	2021–22	Brisbane Broncos	14	0	0	0	0
264	Viliami Vailea	Rd. 20	2021–23	Debut	17	8	0	0	32
265	Jackson Frei	Rd. 22	2021–22	Debut	3	0	0	0	0
266	Aaron Pene	Rd. 1	2022	Melbourne Storm	14	0	0	0	0
267	Jesse Arthars	Rd. 2	2022	Brisbane Broncos	12	5	0	0	20
268	Ashley Taylor	Rd. 2	2022	Gold Coast Titans	1	0	0	0	0
269	Daejarn Asi	Rd. 8	2022	North Queensland Cowboys	8	2	0	0	8
270	Freddy Lussick	Rd. 10	2022–	St. George Illawarra Dragons	40	2	0	0	8
271	Dunamis Lui	Rd. 12	2022	Canberra Raiders	4	0	0	0	0
272	Ronald Volkman	Rd. 14	2022–23	Debut	5	1	0	0	4
273	Brayden Wiliame	Rd. 1	2023	St. George Illawarra Dragons	2	0	0	0	0
274	Te Maire Martin	Rd. 1	2023–	Brisbane Broncos	25	5	0	0	20
275	Mitchell Barnett	Rd. 1	2023–	Newcastle Knights	38	6	0	0	24
276	Jackson Ford	Rd. 1	2023–	St. George Illawarra Dragons	43	7	0	0	24
277	Marata Niukore	Rd. 1	2023–	Parramatta Eels	36	5	0	0	20
278	Dylan Walker	Rd. 1	2023–	Manly Sea Eagles	43	4	0	0	16
279	Taine Tuaupiki	Rd. 3	2023–	Debut	11	1	3	0	10
280	Demitric Vaimauga	Rd. 9	2023–	Debut	7	1	0	0	4
281	Luke Metcalf	Rd. 13	2023–	Cronulla Sharks	19	9	10	0	56
282	Ali Leiataua	Rd. 15	2023–	Debut	7	3	0	0	12
283	Kalani Going	Rd. 27	2023–	Debut	1	0	0	0	0
284	Paul Roache	Rd. 27	2023–	Debut	4	0	0	0	0
285	Kurt Capewell	Rd. 1	2024–	Brisbane Broncos	18	4	0	0	16
286	Jacob Laban	Rd. 5	2024–	Debut	7	0	0	0	0
287	Zyon Maiu'u	Rd. 8	2024–	Debut	1	0	0	0	0
288	Moala Graham-Taufa	Rd. 12	2024–	Sydney Roosters	3	0	0	0	0
289	Leka Halasima	Rd. 18	2024–	Debut	4	0	0	0	0
290	James Fisher-Harris	Rd. 1	2025–	Penrith Panthers	6	0	0	0	0
291	Samuel Healey	Rd. 9	2025–	Debut	1	0	0	0	0
292	Tanner Stowers-Smith	Rd. 11	2025–	Debut	0	0	0	0	0
293	Tanah Boyd	Rd. 19	2025–	Gold coast titans	0	0	0	0	0
294	Eddie Ieremia-Toeava		2025–		0	0	0	0	0
295	Luke Hanson		2026–		0	0	0	0	0
296	Morgan Gannon		2026–		0	0	0	0	0
297	Alofiana Khan-Pereira		2026–		0	0	0	0	0
298	Makaia Tafua		2026–		0	0	0	0	0
299	Riley Price		2026–		0	0	0	0	0
300	Luke Laulilii		2026		0	0	0	0	0
301	Jett Cleary		2026		0	0	0	0	0

=== Women ===
As of 15 September 2026

Cap no.	Name	Debut round	Career span	Previous club	Appearances	Tries	Goals	Field goals	Points
1	Laura Mariu	Rd. 1	2018	Debut	3	0	0	0	0
2	Apii Nicholls	Rd. 1	2018–19, 2025–	Debut	24	2	13	0	34
3	Lanulangi Veainu	Rd. 1	2018	Debut	3	0	0	0	0
4	Shontelle Woodman	Rd. 1	2018	Debut	2	0	0	0	0
5	Sarina Clark	Rd. 1	2018	Debut	3	1	0	0	4
6	Hilda Peters	Rd. 1	2018–20	Debut	9	1	0	0	4
7	Georgia Hale	Rd. 1	2018–20	Debut	9	2	0	0	8
8	Annetta Nu'uausala	Rd. 1	2018–19, 2026–	Debut	13	1	0	0	4
9	Krystal Rota	Rd. 1	2018–19	Debut	6	0	0	0	0
10	Aieshaleigh Smalley	Rd. 1	2018–19	Debut	5	1	0	0	4
11	Onjeurlina Leiataua	Rd. 1	2018–19	Debut	6	1	0	0	4
12	Alice Vailea	Rd. 1	2018	Debut	3	0	0	0	0
13	Luisa Gago	Rd. 1	2018	Debut	3	1	0	0	4
14	Tanika-Jazz Noble-Bell	Rd. 1	2019	Debut	2	0	0	0	0
15	Lorina Papali'i	Rd. 1	2018	Debut	3	0	0	0	0
16	Kahurangi Peters	Rd. 1	2018	Debut	1	0	0	0	0
17	Masuisuimatamaalii Tauaua-Pauaraisa	Rd. 1	2018	Debut	3	0	0	0	0
18	Lisa Edwards	Rd. 2	2018	Debut	1	0	0	0	0
19	Crystal Tamarua	Rd. 2	2018–20	Debut	7	0	0	0	0
20	Amber Kani	Rd. 2	2018–19	Debut	2	0	0	0	0
21	Raquel Anderson	Rd. 2	2018	Debut	2	1	0	0	4
22	Va'anessa Molia-Fraser	Rd. 3	2018	Debut	1	0	0	0	0
23	Jules Newman	Rd. 1	2019	Debut	3	0	0	0	0
24	Atawhai Tupaea	Rd. 1	2019	Debut	3	1	0	0	4
25	Madison Bartlett	Rd. 1	2019–20	Debut	5	2	0	0	8
26	Timaima Ravisa	Rd. 1	2019	Debut	2	0	0	0	0
27	Charntay Poko	Rd. 1	2019	Debut	3	1	0	0	4
28	Kathleen Wharton	Rd. 1	2019	Debut	3	0	0	0	0
29	Kanyon Paul	Rd. 1	2019–20	Debut	5	0	0	0	0
30	Billy-Jean Ale	Rd. 1	2019	Debut	3	0	0	0	0
31	Roela Radiniyavuni	Rd. 2	2019	Debut	1	0	0	0	0
32	Tyler Reid	Rd. 2	2019	Debut	1	0	0	0	0
33	Tasia Seumanufagai	Rd. 3	2019	Debut	1	0	0	0	0
34	Karina Brown	Rd. 1	2020	Sydney Roosters	3	0	0	0	0
35	Teaghan Hartigan	Rd. 1	2020	Debut	2	0	0	0	0
36	Evania Isa'ako	Rd. 1	2020	Debut	3	3	0	0	12
37	Ellia Green	Rd. 1	2020	Debut	3	2	0	0	8
38	Kirra Dibb	Rd. 1	2020	Sydney Roosters	3	1	4	0	12
39	Simone Smith	Rd. 1	2020	Sydney Roosters	2	1	0	0	4
40	Kayla Sauvao	Rd. 1	2020	Debut	2	0	0	0	0
41	Tazmin Rapana	Rd. 1	2020	Brisbane Broncos	3	0	0	0	0
42	Shaniah Power	Rd. 1	2020	Debut	2	2	0	0	8
43	Taimane Levu	Rd. 1	2020	Debut	2	0	0	0	0
44	Samantha Economos	Rd. 1	2020	Debut	3	0	0	0	0
45	Brianna Clark	Rd. 1	2020	Debut	2	0	0	0	0
46	Shontelle Stowers	Rd. 2	2020	Sydney Roosters	2	0	0	0	0
47	Michaela Peck	Rd. 2	2020	Debut	2	0	0	0	0
48	Stephanie Ball	Rd. 2	2020	Debut	1	0	0	0	0
49	Naomi Kara	Rd. 3	2020	Debut	1	0	0	0	0
50	Laken Paitai	Rd. 3	2020	Debut	1	0	0	0	0
51	Michaela Brake	Rd. 1	2025	Debut	4	2	0	0	8
52	Tysha Ikenasio	Rd. 1	2025–	Debut	18	10	0	0	40
53	Emmanita Paki	Rd. 1	2025–	Newcastle Knights	19	3	0	0	12
54	Payton Takimoana	Rd. 1	2025–	Debut	19	18	0	0	72
55	Patricia Maliepo	Rd. 1	2025–	Debut	20	7	30	0	88
56	Emily Curtain	Rd. 1	2025	Wests Tigers	5	0	0	0	0
57	Harata Butler	Rd. 1	2025–	Cronulla Sharks	22	0	0	0	0
58	Capri Paekau	Rd. 1	2025–	Parramatta Eels	18	1	0	0	4
59	Lavinia Kitai	Rd. 1	2025	Debut	11	0	0	0	0
60	Shakira Baker	Rd. 1	2025–	Debut	19	1	0	0	4
61	Kaiyah Atai	Rd. 1	2025–	Debut	19	2	0	0	8
62	Laishon Albert-Jones	Rd. 1	2025–	Newcastle Knights	10	2	0	0	8
63	Lydia Turua-Quedley	Rd. 1	2025	Debut	11	0	0	0	0
64	Maarire Puketapu	Rd. 1	2025–	Debut	19	0	0	0	0
65	Ashlee Matapo	Rd. 1	2025–	Debut	15	0	0	0	0
66	Matekino Gray	Rd. 1	2025–	Debut	11	0	0	0	0
67	Avery-Rose Carmont	Rd. 4	2025	Debut	4	0	0	0	0
68	Metanoia Fetalaiga	Rd. 4	2025–	Debut	14	1	0	0	4
69	Makayla Eli	Rd. 4	2025	Debut	3	0	0	0	0
70	Tyra Wetere	Rd. 5	2025	Debut	6	5	0	0	20
71	Ivana Lauitiiti	Rd. 5	2025–	Debut	13	4	0	0	16
72	Lavinia Tauhalaliku	Rd. 7	2025–	North Queensland Cowboys	7	10	0	0	40
73	Kalyn Takitimu-Cook	Rd. 8	2025	Debut	2	0	0	0	0
74	Paris Pickering	Rd. 9	2025	Debut	2	0	0	0	0
76	Gayle Broughton	Rd. 1	2026	Brisbane Broncos	9	3	0	0	12
77	Mya Hill-Moana	Rd. 1	2026	Sydney Roosters	6	0	0	0	0
78	Jasmin Huriwai	Rd. 1	2026	Debut	10	2	3	0	14
79	Christabelle Onesemo-Tuilaepa	Rd. 1	2026	Debut	7	0	0	0	0
80	Ocean Tierney	Rd. 2	2026	Debut	3	3	0	0	12
81	Stacey Waaka	Rd. 2	2026	Brisbane Broncos	10	9	0	0	36
82	Natalia Hickling	Rd. 2	2026	Debut	1	0	0	0	0
83	Mele Hufanga	Rd. 5	2026	Brisbane Broncos	7	4	0	0	16
84	Anastasia Sekene	Rd. 9	2026	Debut	2	0	0	0	0

== Key ==
- An asterisk (*) next to a name denotes that the player had more than one spell at the club.
- A cross (†) next to a name denotes that the player played in the 1997 World Club Championship. These games are not included in the above statistics.
