= 2009 New Zealand Warriors season =

- NRL rank: 14th
- 2009 record: Wins: 7; draws: 2; losses: 14
- Points scored: For: 377; against: 515

Team information
- CEO: Wayne Scurrah
- Coach: Ivan Cleary
- Assistant coach: John Ackland
- Captains: Steve Price; Micheal Luck
- Stadium: Mt Smart Stadium
- Avg. attendance: 15,486

Top scorers
- Tries: Manu Vatuvei (13)
- Goals: Kevin Locke (22)
- Points: Kevin Locke (60)
← 2008	2010 →

The 2009 New Zealand Warriors season was the 15th in the club's history. They competed in the NRL's 2009 Telstra Premiership and finished 14th (out of 16). The coach of the Warriors was Ivan Cleary while Steve Price was the team's captain. In 2009 Warriors games were broadcast on New Zealand's Sky network averaged 107,163 viewers.

== Milestones ==
- 14 March – Round One: Steve Price played in his 300th National Rugby League game.
- 14 March – Round One: Four players made their debuts for the Warriors; Denan Kemp, Joel Moon, Jacob Lillyman & Leeson Ah Mau. Ah Mau also made his first grade debut.
- 22 March – Round Two: Two players made their debuts for the Warriors; Jesse Royal & Ukuma Ta'ai. Ta'ai also made his first grade debut.
- 5 April – Round Four: Game dedicated to the memory of Sonny Fai, the Warriors lose to the South Sydney Rabbitohs 22–16.
- 5 April – Round Four: Nathan Fien played in his 100th game for the Warriors.
- 5 April – Round Four: Daniel O'Regan made his first grade debut, becoming Warrior #150.
- 3 May – Round Eight: Lewis Brown made his first grade debut.
- 17 May – Round Ten: Jerome Ropati played in his 100th National Rugby League game and 100th game for the club.
- 31 May – Round Twelve: Two players made their first grade debuts; Kevin Locke and Aaron Heremaia.
- 12 June – Round Fourteen: Stacey Jones played in his 250th game for the club.
- 19 July – Round Nineteen: Isaac John made his first grade debut.
- 26 July – Round Twenty: Patrick Ah Van played in his 50th National Rugby League game and 50th game for the club.
- 31 July – Round Twenty One: Evarn Tuimavave played in his 100th National Rugby League game and 100th game for the club. It was also Tuimavave's first game of the season.
- 15 August – Round Twenty Three: Siuatonga Likiliki made his first grade debut.
- 5 September – Round Twenty Six: Simon Mannering played in his 100th National Rugby League game and 100th game for the club.
- 5 September – Round Twenty Six: Stacey Jones played in his last game for the club, the Warriors lost to the Melbourne Storm 30–0.

== Jersey and sponsors ==

The Warriors used a New Jersey design in 2009, produced by Canterbury of New Zealand. Previously Puma AG had supplied the Warriors with apparel. The jerseys were unveiled on 25 February. The Main jersey retained the Black & White colours of the previous jersey, with a reversed scheme for the away jersey. The Warriors used a Blue jersey for the "Heritage round" in Round 10, to represent the Auckland. The Heritage jersey was also worn in Round 12, to celebrate the centenary of the Auckland Rugby League, and in Rounds 24 and 25.

Vodafone New Zealand was again the naming rights sponsor of the Warriors in 2009. Lion Red was the sleeve sponsor. Suzuki and HiFX were featured on the shorts while Loadlift was on the back of the jersey. Other major sponsors included ZM and Flava.

== Fixtures ==
The Warriors used Mt Smart Stadium as their home ground in 2009, their only home ground since they entered the competition in 1995.

=== Trial Matches ===
Date	Round	Opponent	Venue	Result	Score	Tries	Goals	Attendance	Report
12 February	Trial 1	Melbourne Storm	Waikato Stadium, Hamilton	Win	24 – 12	McKinnon, Kirk, O'Regan, Vatuvei	Kemp (3), Ah Van	10,800	
22 February	Trial 2	North Queensland Cowboys	North Harbour Stadium, Auckland	Win	32 – 28	Ah Van, Moon, Hohaia, Solomona, Brown, Vatuvei	Kemp (2), Moon (2)	16,500	
28 February	Trial 3	Gold Coast Titans	Oakes Oval, Lismore	Win	34 – 12	Kemp (2), McKinnon (2), Tate, Rapira, Moon	Kemp (2), Moon	5,117	

=== Regular season ===
Date	Round	Opponent	Venue	Result	Score	Tries	Goals	Attendance	Report
14 March	Round 1	Parramatta Eels	Mt Smart Stadium, Auckland	Win	26 – 18	Hohaia (2), Moon, Packer	Kemp (5)	20,102	
22 March	Round 2	Manly-Warringah Sea Eagles	Brookvale Oval, Sydney	Win	26 – 24	Tate (2), Vatuvei, Royal, Ropati	Kemp (3)	16,307	
28 March	Round 3	Brisbane Broncos	Mt Smart Stadium, Auckland	Loss	10 – 26	Mannering, Ta'ai	Kemp (1)	24,350	
5 April	Round 4	South Sydney Rabbitohs	Mt Smart Stadium, Auckland	Loss	16 – 22	Kirk, Luck, McKinnon	Kemp (2)	19,386	
12 April	Round 5	Newcastle Knights	EnergyAustralia Stadium, Newcastle	Loss	22 – 24	McKinnon, Fien, Packer, Ah Van	Kemp (3)	16,307	
19 April	Round 6	Sydney Roosters	Mt Smart Stadium, Auckland	Win (G.P.)	17 – 16	Jones, Ropati, Vatuvei	Kemp (2), Jones (FG)	16,309	
25 April	Round 7	Melbourne Storm	Olympic Park Stadium, Melbourne	Draw (G.P.)	14 – 14	Vatuvei (2), Ah Van	Kemp (1)	15,200	
3 May	Round 8	St George Illawarra Dragons	WIN Stadium, Wollongong	Loss	11 – 12	Ah Van, Ropati	Ah Van (1), Jones (FG)	14,562	}
	Round 9	Bye			–				
17 May	Round 10	North Queensland Cowboys	Mt Smart Stadium, Auckland	Loss	12 – 34	Fien, Kemp	Kemp (2)	16,345	
24 May	Round 11	Canberra Raiders	Canberra Stadium, Canberra	Loss	12 – 38	Price, Mannering	Kemp (2)	8,383	
31 May	Round 12	Wests Tigers	Mt Smart Stadium, Auckland	Win	14 – 0	Locke (2), McKinnon	Locke (1)	15,365	
7 June	Round 13	Cronulla Sharks	Toyota Stadium, Sydney	Loss	10 – 18	Vatuvei, Brown	Locke (1)	14,082	
13 June	Round 14	Newcastle Knights	Mt Smart Stadium, Auckland	Win	13 – 0	Hohaia, Locke	Locke (2), Hohaia (FG)	14,255	
	Round 15	Bye			–				
27 June	Round 16	Gold Coast Titans	Skilled Park, Robina	Loss	12 – 28	Hohaia, Brown	Locke (2)	20,031	
3 July	Round 17	Brisbane Broncos	Suncorp Stadium, Brisbane	Loss	14 – 28	Price (2)	Locke (3)	32,456	
12 July	Round 18	Bulldogs	Mt Smart Stadium, Auckland	Loss	14 – 18	Vatuvei, Locke, Packer	Locke (1)	11,802	
19 July	Round 19	Sydney Roosters	Sydney Football Stadium, Sydney	Win	30 – 24	Vatuvei (2), Ah Van, Mannering, Jones	Jones (3)	8,021	
26 July	Round 20	St George Illawarra Dragons	Mt Smart Stadium, Auckland	Loss	4 – 29	Moon		13,507	
1 August	Round 21	Penrith Panthers	CUA Stadium, Sydney	Draw (G.P.)	32 – 32	Moon (4), Brown	Locke (6)	12,677	
9 August	Round 22	Gold Coast Titans	Mt Smart Stadium, Auckland	Loss	10 – 30	Vatuvei (2)	Locke (1)	10,205	
15 August	Round 23	Parramatta Eels	Parramatta Stadium, Sydney	Loss	4 – 40	Vatuvei		12,627	
23 August	Round 24	Canberra Raiders	Mt Smart Stadium, Auckland	Won	34 – 20	Hohaia (2), Heremaia, Mannering, Ropati, Moon	Locke (5)	8,812	
30 August	Round 25	Bulldogs	ANZ Stadium, Sydney	Loss	20 – 40	Vatuvei (2), Rapira (2)	Jones (2)	41,835	
5 September	Round 26	Melbourne Storm	Mt Smart Stadium, Auckland	Loss	0 – 30			14,734	

== Ladder ==
2009 NRL season
Pos	Team	Pld	W	D	L	B	PF	PA	PD	Pts
1	St. George Illawarra Dragons	24	17	0	7	2	548	329	+219	38
2	Canterbury-Bankstown Bulldogs	24	18	0	6	2	575	428	+147	38^{1}
3	Gold Coast Titans	24	16	0	8	2	514	467	+47	36
4	Melbourne Storm	24	14	1	9	2	505	348	+157	33
5	Manly-Warringah Sea Eagles	24	14	0	10	2	549	459	+90	32
6	Brisbane Broncos	24	14	0	10	2	511	566	−55	32
7	Newcastle Knights	24	13	0	11	2	508	491	+17	30
8	Parramatta Eels	24	12	1	11	2	476	473	+3	29
9	Wests Tigers	24	12	0	12	2	558	483	+75	28
10	South Sydney Rabbitohs	24	11	1	12	2	566	549	+17	27
11	Penrith Panthers	24	11	1	12	2	515	589	−74	27
12	North Queensland Cowboys	24	11	0	13	2	558	474	+84	26
13	Canberra Raiders	24	9	0	15	2	489	520	−31	22
14	New Zealand Warriors	24	7	2	15	2	377	565	−188	20
15	Cronulla-Sutherland Sharks	24	5	0	19	2	359	568	−209	14
16	Sydney Roosters	24	5	0	19	2	382	681	−299	14

^{1} The Bulldogs were deducted 2 competition points after an interchange breach in Round 2.

== Squad ==
The Warriors used Twenty Nine players in 2009. Twelve players made their debut for the club, including eight making their National Rugby League debuts.

No.	Name	Nationality	Position	Warriors debut	App	T	G	FG	Pts
24	Stacey Jones	New Zealand	HB	23 April 1995	23	2	5	2	20
99	Lance Hohaia	New Zealand	UB	6 April 2002	20	6	0	1	25
102	Evarn Tuimavave	New Zealand	PR	1 September 2002	6	0	0	0	0
108	Jerome Ropati	New Zealand	CE / FE	31 August 2003	17	4	0	0	16
115	Manu Vatuvei	New Zealand	WG	23 May 2004	19	13	0	0	52
121	Steve Price	Australia	PR	13 March 2005	14	3	0	0	12
124	Nathan Fien	New Zealand	HK	13 March 2005	9	2	0	0	8
125	Simon Mannering	New Zealand	CE	26 June 2005	23	4	0	0	16
126	Micheal Luck	Australia	SR	12 March 2006	23	1	0	0	4
129	Patrick Ah Van	New Zealand	WG	9 April 2006	14	4	1	0	18
131	Sam Rapira	New Zealand	PR	20 May 2006	23	2	0	0	8
132	Wade McKinnon	Australia	FB	17 March 2007	21	4	0	0	16
136	Aidan Kirk	Australia	FB / CE	17 March 2008	5	1	0	0	4
137	Brent Tate	Australia	CE	17 March 2008	3	2	0	0	8
138	Ian Henderson	Scotland	HK	23 March 2008	22	0	0	0	0
141	Russell Packer	New Zealand	PR	4 May 2008	21	3	0	0	12
142	Ben Matulino	New Zealand	SR	14 June 2008	17	0	0	0	0
144	Denan Kemp	Australia	WG	14 March 2009	10	1	21	0	46
145	Joel Moon	Australia	FE	14 March 2009	23	7	0	0	28
146	Jacob Lillyman	Australia	PR	14 March 2009	24	0	0	0	0
147	Leeson Ah Mau	New Zealand	PR	14 March 2009	2	0	0	0	0
148	Jesse Royal	New Zealand	PR	22 March 2009	15	1	0	0	4
149	Ukuma Ta'ai	Tonga	SR	22 March 2009	10	1	0	0	4
150	Daniel O'Regan	New Zealand	FE	5 April 2009	1	0	0	0	0
151	Lewis Brown	New Zealand	HK	3 May 2009	15	3	0	0	12
152	Kevin Locke	New Zealand	FB	31 May 2009	12	4	22	0	60
153	Aaron Heremaia	New Zealand	HB	31 May 2009	11	1	0	0	4
154	Isaac John	New Zealand	FE	19 July 2009	3	0	0	0	0
155	Siuatonga Likiliki	New Zealand	CE	15 August 2009	1	0	0	0	0

== Staff ==
- Chief executive officer: Wayne Scurrah

=== NRL staff ===
- NRL head coach: Ivan Cleary
- NRL assistant coach: John Ackland
- NRL head trainer: Craig Walker
- NRL assistant trainer: Dayne Norton
- NRL football manager: Don Mann Jr
- NRL physiotherapist: Jude Spiers
- Club doctor: John Mayhew

=== NYC staff ===
- NYC head coach: Tony Iro
- NYC assistant coach: Frank Harold
- NYC team manager: Dean Bell

== Transfers ==
=== Gains ===
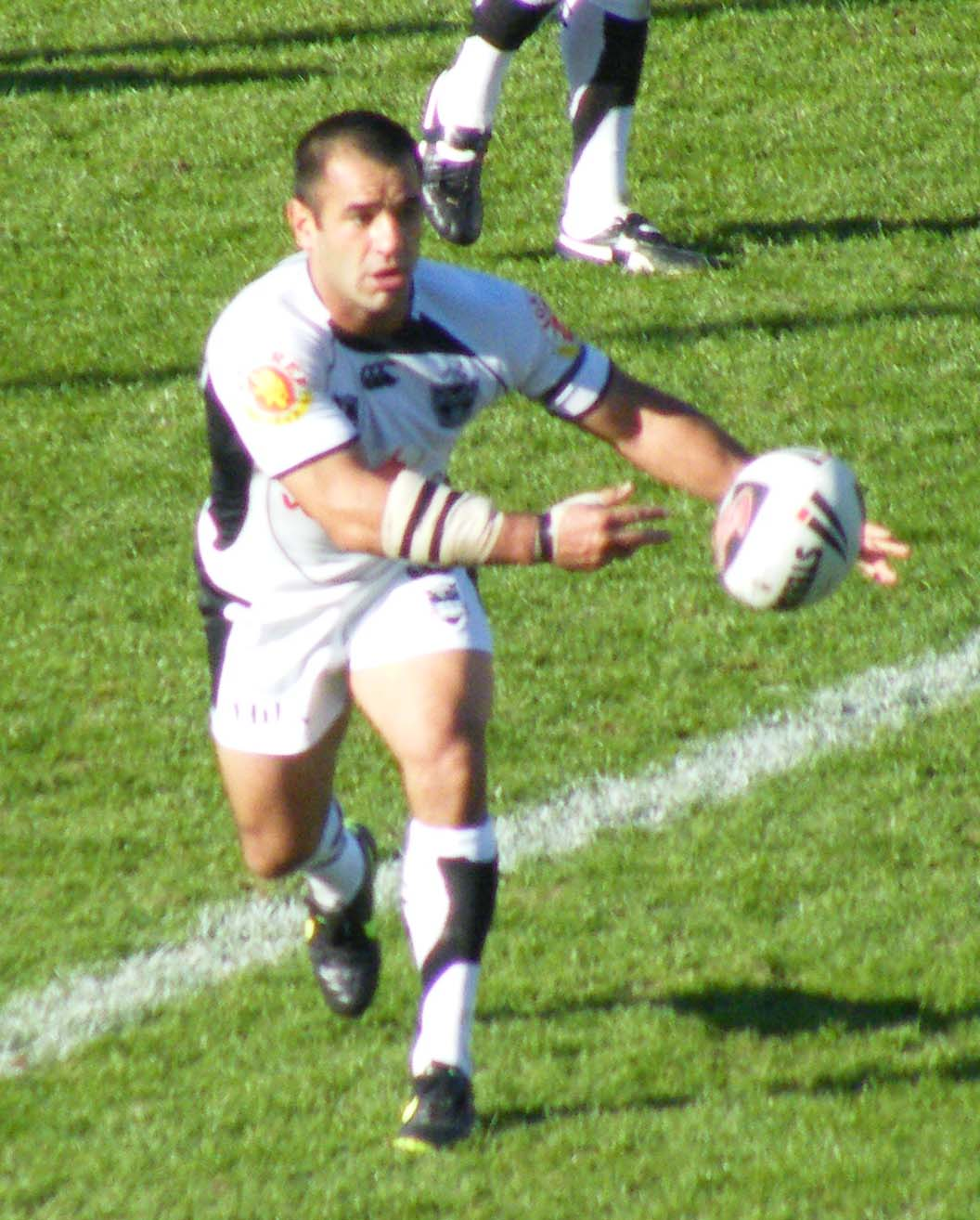
Stacey Jones: came out of retirement to play for the Warriors in 2009

Player	Previous club	Length	Notes
Liam Foran	Melbourne Storm	2009, with option	
Jacob Lillyman	North Queensland Cowboys	2010	
Denan Kemp	Brisbane Broncos	2010	
Joel Moon	Brisbane Broncos	2011	
Stacey Jones	Retired	2009	
Lewis Brown	Wests Tigers	2009, with option	
Jesse Royal	Newcastle Knights	2010	

=== Losses ===
Player	Club	Notes
Ruben Wiki	Retired	
Wairangi Koopu	Melbourne Storm	
Logan Swann	Retired	
Michael Crockett	Released	
Ryan Shortland	Released	
Grant Rovelli	North Queensland Cowboys	
Sonny Fai	presumed drowned	

=== Mid-Season Losses ===
Player	Club	Notes
Epalahame Lauaki	Hull	
Michael Witt	Otago Rugby Union	
Liam Foran	Newtown Jets	
Nathan Fien	St. George Illawarra Dragons	

=== Contract extensions ===
- Simon Mannering (until 2012)
- Jerome Ropati (until 2012)
- Lance Hohaia (until 2011, with option)
- Patrick Ah Van (until 2011)
- Aaron Heremaia (until 2011, with option)
- Isaac John (until 2011, with option)
- Ian Henderson (until 2011)
- Ivan Cleary (until 2012)

== Sonny Fai ==
Warrior Sonny Fai went missing at around 7pm on 4 January 2009, after being caught in a rip current while trying to save some family who had got into difficulty at Te Henga (Bethells Beach), Auckland. His body was never recovered. The entire team attended his two memorial services, one in a Samoan Methodist Church and one held at Te Henga (Bethells Beach).

The Warriors wore black armbands for their opening NRL match of the 2009 season, as well as jerseys embroidered with Fai's signature and official team number in honour of him.

== End of Season awards ==
- Lion Red Player of the Year: Micheal Luck
- Canterbury of New Zealand Clubman of the Year: Sam Rapira
- Vodafone NRL Young Player of the Year: Russell Packer
- Vodafone One Tribe Supporters' Player of the Year: Kevin Locke
- Sonny Fai Medal: Elijah Taylor

== Other teams ==
In 2009 the Junior Warriors again competed in the Toyota Cup while senior players who were not required for the first team played with the Auckland Vulcans in the NSW Cup. The Auckland Vulcans were coached by Bernie Perenara and finished 11th out of eleven teams.

Daniel O'Regan was the Vulcan's player of the year, while Pita Godinet was the runner up and Sione Tongia was the rookie of the year.

=== 2009 Junior Warriors ===
Siuatonga Likiliki was named in the 2009 Toyota Cup team of the year.

Pos	Team	Pld	W	D	L	B	PF	PA	PD	Pts	
1	Manly Warringah Sea Eagles (M)	24	19	1	4	2	879	417	+462	39	Advance to finals series
2	St. George Illawarra Dragons	24	19	0	5	2	758	461	+297	38	Advance to finals series
3	Melbourne Storm (P)	24	19	0	5	2	833	597	+236	38	Advance to finals series
4	Wests Tigers	24	15	1	8	2	709	588	+121	31	Advance to finals series
5	Brisbane Broncos	24	15	0	9	2	698	551	+147	30	Advance to finals series
6	South Sydney Rabbitohs	24	13	1	10	2	776	568	+208	27	Advance to finals series
7	New Zealand Warriors	24	13	1	10	2	725	612	+113	27	Advance to finals series
8	Canberra Raiders	24	11	2	11	2	706	685	+21	24	Advance to finals series
9	North Queensland Cowboys	24	12	0	12	2	668	683	−15	24	
10	Newcastle Knights	24	9	1	14	2	596	756	−160	19	
11	Canterbury Bulldogs	24	9	1	14	2	649	867	−218	19	
12	Parramatta Eels	24	8	0	16	2	604	698	−94	16	
13	Penrith Panthers	24	8	0	16	2	573	755	−182	16	
14	Gold Coast Titans	24	8	0	16	2	542	738	−196	16	
15	Sydney Roosters	24	6	0	18	2	443	736	−293	12	
16	Cronulla-Sutherland Sharks (W)	24	4	0	20	2	391	838	−447	8	

Updated to match(es) played on 4 October 2009. Source: 2009 NYC Toyota Cup - RLP, 2009 NRL Under-20s season
(M) Minor premiers; (P) Premiers; (W) Wooden spoon

Qualifying finals
1	Manly	28
8	St. George Illawarra	48
2	Melbourne Storm	54
7	Wests Tigers	22
3	Brisbane Broncos	46
6	South Sydney	18
4	NZ Warriors	24
5	Canberra Raiders	32

Semifinals
4W	Canberra Raiders	34
2L	Wests Tigers	42
3W	Brisbane Broncos	24
1L	doggies	10

Preliminary finals
1W	St. George Illawarra	12
Wests Tigers	36
2W	Melbourne Storm	40
Brisbane Broncos	16

Final
Wests Tigers	22
Melbourne Storm	24
