= 2016 Mackay Cutters season =

- Queensland Cup rank: 14th
- Play-off result: Missed finals
- 2016 record: Wins: 4; draws: 1; losses: 18
- Points scored: For: 468; against: 733

Team information
- CEO: Troy Rovelli
- Coach: David Simpson (resigned on 23 June); Jim Wilson (interim)
- Captain: Brenden Treston
- Stadium: BB Print Stadium

Top scorers
- Tries: Liam Taylor (12)
- Goals: Liam Taylor (58)
- Points: Liam Taylor (164)
← 2015	2017 →

The 2016 Mackay Cutters season was the ninth in the club's history. Coached by David Simpson and captained by Brenden Treston, they competed in the QRL's Intrust Super Cup.

On 23 June, after just one win from their first 15 games, Simpson resigned and was replaced by Jim Wilson. The Cutters endured one of the worst seasons in their history, winning just four games and finishing last.

== Season summary ==
Following the departure of premiership-winning head coach Kim Williams, his assistant David Simpson was named as the club's head coach for 2016. His reign at the club got off to a disastrous start, as the side won just one of their first 15 games. Sitting in dead last on the ladder, Simpson resigned on 23 June and was replaced by his assistant Jim Wilson, who took the job on an interim basis for the rest of the season.

Under Wilson, the club won three of their final nine games and finished the season in last place, winning their second wooden spoon. One of the few positive stories of the season for the Cutters was the rise of North Queensland Cowboys-contracted hooker Josh Chudleigh, who on the Courier Mail Medal for Queensland Cup Player of the Year. He was also named the club's Player of the Year at their end of season awards night.

== Squad List ==
=== 2016 squad ===
Mackay Cutters
First team squad			Coaching staff
Delayne Ashby – HB; Blake Atherton – CE; Joss Boyton – SR; Howard Brown – FE; Jack Creith – CE; Andrew Davey – SR; Johnny Faletagoa'i – WG; Alex Farrell – SR; Leonati Feiloakitau – PR; Andrew Gay – CE; Yosepha Kepa – FE	Ryan Kinlyside – PR; Nathan Lo Monaco – HK; Brad Lupi – PR; Tyson Martin – SR; Nicholas Mataia – CE; Kelvin Nielsen – SR; John Papalii – PR; Dylan Patteson – SR; Michael Pearsall – WG; Jordan Pereira – WG; Dalton Phillips – SR	Jacob Pottinger – HK; Steve Rapira – SR; Isaac Richardson – PR; Grant Rovelli – HB; Tone Susuga – PR; Liam Taylor – FB; Sam Thorpe – SR; Brenden Treston (c) – SR; Michael Uluakiola – PR; Regan Verney – FE	Head coach: Jim Wilson (interim); Legend: (c) Captain(s); (vc) Vice-captain(s)

== Squad movement ==
=== Gains ===
Player	Signed From	Until End of	Notes
Delayne Ashby	Gold Coast Titans	2016	
Howard Brown	West Belconnen Warriors	2016	
Jack Creith	Parkes Spacemen	2016	
Johnny Faletagoa'i	West Belconnen Warriors	2016	
Leonati Feiloakitau	Newtown Jets	2016	
Nathan Lo Monaco	Newcastle Knights	2016	
John Papalii	West Belconnen Warriors	2016	
Jacob Pottinger	Muswellbrook Rams	2016	
Grant Rovelli	Souths Mackay Sharks	2016	
Sam Thorpe	Dubbo Westside	2016	
Michael Uluakiola	West Belconnen Warriors	2016	
Regan Verney	Northern Pride	2016	

=== Losses ===
Player	Signed From	Until End of	Notes
Gavin Bennion	Halifax RLFC	2016	
Sam Clune	Penrith Panthers	2016	
Corey Cox	Released	–	
Cameron Cullen	Redcliffe Dolphins	2016	
Mitch Day	Released	–	
Aleki Falepaini	Central Queensland Capras	2016	
Chris Gesch	Redcliffe Dolphins	2016	
Rex Johnson	Released	–	
Ben Jones	Released	–	
Zac Radel	Released	–	
Justin Tavae	Central Queensland Capras	2016	
Pulou Vaituutuu	Released	–	

== Fixtures ==
=== Regular season ===
Date	Round	Opponent	Venue	Score	Tries	Goals
Saturday, 5 March	Round 1	Central Queensland Capras	BB Print Stadium	10 – 24	Boyton, Pereira	Taylor (1)
Sunday, 13 March	Round 2	Northern Pride	Barlow Park	24 – 44	Chudleigh, Faletagoa'i, Treston, Wright	Taylor (4)
Sunday, 20 March	Round 3	Easts Tigers	BB Print Stadium	22 – 26	Taylor (2), Martin, Wright	Taylor (3)
Saturday, 26 March	Round 4	Burleigh Bears	Pizzey Park	18 – 36	Brown, Creith, Treston	Taylor (3)
Saturday, 2 April	Round 5	PNG Hunters	BB Print Stadium	20 – 34	Brown, Faletagoa'i, Gay, Treston	Taylor (2)
Saturday, 9 April	Round 6	Norths Devils	BB Print Stadium	16 – 32	Chudleigh (2), Taylor	Taylor (2)
Saturday, 16 April	Round 7	Redcliffe Dolphins	BB Print Stadium	20 – 26	Creith, Faletagoa'i, Pearsall, Taylor	Taylor (2)
Sunday, 24 April	Round 8	Tweed Heads Seagulls	Piggabeen Sports Complex	24 – 37	Asiata (2), Pereira, Uele	Taylor (4)
Friday, 29 April	Round 9	Ipswich Jets	BB Print Stadium	38 – 36	Taylor (2), Feiloakitau, Moga, Pereira, Uele, Verney	Taylor (5)
Sunday, 15 May	Round 10	Wynnum Manly Seagulls	BMD Kougari Oval	16 – 62	Ashby, Davey, Taylor	Taylor (2)
Saturday, 21 May	Round 11	Townsville Blackhawks	Jack Manski Oval	8 – 52	Pearsall, Susuga	
	Round 12	Bye				
Sunday, 5 June	Round 13	Souths Logan Magpies	Davies Park	18 – 18	Kepa, Taylor, Uele	Taylor (3)
Saturday, 11 June	Round 14	Central Queensland Capras	Browne Park	20 – 24	Davey, Mago, Taylor	Taylor (4)
Saturday, 18 June	Round 15	Northern Pride	BB Print Stadium	18 – 22	Atherton, Boyton, Creith	Taylor (3)
Sunday, 26 June	Round 16	Redcliffe Dolphins	Dolphin Oval	28 – 36	Atherton, Kepa, Mago, Moga, Treston	Taylor (4)
Saturday, 2 July	Round 17	Sunshine Coast Falcons	BB Print Stadium	26 – 18	Chudleigh, Davey, Mago, Taylor, Uele	Taylor (3)
	Round 18	Bye				
Saturday, 16 July	Round 19	Ipswich Jets	North Ipswich Reserve	6 – 38	Davey	Taylor (1)
Saturday, 23 July	Round 20	Wynnum Manly Seagulls	Daryl Burke Oval	28 – 10	Feiloakitau, Moga, Pereira, Taylor, Uele	Taylor (4)
Friday, 29 July	Round 21	Townsville Blackhawks	BB Print Stadium	14 – 16	Faletagoa'i (2), Ashby	Taylor (1)
Saturday, 6 August	Round 22	Tweed Heads Seagulls	BB Print Stadium	30 – 10	Davey (2), Kepa, Moga, Pereira, Taylor	Taylor (3)
Saturday, 13 August	Round 23	Norths Devils	Bishop Park	22 – 44	Uele (2), Davey, Pearsall	Ashby (2), Faletagoa'i (1)
Saturday, 20 August	Round 24	Souths Logan Magpies	BB Print Stadium	22 – 40	Asiata, Chudleigh, Kepa, Pereira	Taylor (2), Asiata (1)
Sunday, 28 August	Round 25	Easts Tigers	Langlands Park	20 – 48	Faletagoa'i (2), Davey, Moga	Taylor (2)
Legend: Win Loss Draw Bye

== Statistics ==
Denotes player contracted to the North Queensland Cowboys for the 2016 season

Name	App	T	G	FG	Pts
Delayne Ashby	16	2	2	-	12
John Asiata	5	3	1	-	14
Blake Atherton	8	2	-	-	8
Cooper Bambling	1	-	-	-	-
Ross Bella	1	-	-	-	-
Joss Boyton	20	2	-	-	8
Howard Brown	5	2	-	-	8
Josh Chudleigh	21	5	-	-	20
Jack Creith	14	3	-	-	12
Andrew Davey	22	8	-	-	32
Johnny Faletagoa'i	19	6	1	-	26
Alex Farrell	11	-	-	-	-
Leonati Feiloakitau	13	3	-	-	12
Andrew Gay	4	1	-	-	4
Yosepha Kepa	11	4	-	-	16
Ryan Kinlyside	19	-	-	-	-
Brad Lupi	6	-	-	-	-
Patrick Mago	13	3	-	-	12
Tyson Martin	6	1	-	-	4
Nicholas Mataia	2	-	-	-	-
Tautau Moga	18	5	-	-	20
Dylan Patteson	2	-	-	-	-
Michael Pearsall	7	3	-	-	12
Jordan Pereira	23	6	-	-	24
Dalton Phillips	8	-	-	-	-
Jacob Pottinger	14	-	-	-	-
Steve Rapira	5	-	-	-	-
Isaac Richardson	16	-	-	-	-
Grant Rovelli	4	-	-	-	-
Tone Susuga	2	1	-	-	4
Liam Taylor	21	12	58	-	164
Brenden Treston	19	4	-	-	16
Braden Uele	22	7	-	-	28
Regan Verney	7	1	-	-	4
Matthew Wright	6	2	-	-	8
Totals		86	62	1	468

== Honours ==
=== Club ===
- Player of the Year: Josh Chudleigh
- Players' Player: Brenden Treston
- Rookie of the Year: Andrew Davey
- Club Person of the Year: Jim Wilson
- Sponsors Player of the Year: Josh Chudleigh

=== League ===
- Courier Mail Medal: Josh Chudleigh
- Hooker of the Year: Josh Chudleigh
