= 2015 Mackay Cutters season =

- Queensland Cup rank: 8th
- Play-off result: Missed finals
- 2015 record: Wins: 10; draws: 1; losses: 12
- Points scored: For: 547; against: 497

Team information
- CEO: Ross Aldridge
- Coach: Kim Williams
- Captain: Chris Gesch & Liam Taylor
- Stadium: Stadium Mackay

Top scorers
- Tries: Josh Chudleigh (16)
- Goals: Liam Taylor (61)
- Points: Liam Taylor (143)
← 2014	2016 →

The 2015 Mackay Cutters season was the eighth in the club's history. Coached by Kim Williams and captained by Chris Gesch and Liam Taylor, they competed in the QRL's Intrust Super Cup. The club missed the finals for the second consecutive season, finishing 8th.

== Season summary ==
Looking to return to the finals after missing out in 2014, the Cutters recruited former NRL and Super League forward Steve Rapira, who had previously played for the club in 2009 while contracted to the North Queensland Cowboys, Samoan international Michael Sio and former Brisbane Broncos NRL squad member Cameron Cullen.

The season started strongly for the club, as they went on a five-game winning streak, winning five of their first seven games. The period between their two byes was poor for the side, winning just four of their nine games. On 10 June, it was announced that Kim Williams would be leaving the club at the end of the season to coach the Central Queensland Capras. Seven days later, key off-season recruit Michel Sio left the club, signing with Super League side, Wakefield Trinity. The Cutters ended the year winning one and drawing one of their last seven to finish the season in 8th.

On 9 September, Cowboys-contracted player Josh Chudleigh was named at hooker in the Queensland Cup Team of the Year.

== Squad List ==
=== 2015 squad ===
Mackay Cutters
First team squad			Coaching staff
Rohan Ahern – SR; Blake Atherton – CE; Gavin Bennion – PR; Joss Boyton – SR; Sam Clune – FB, FE; Corey Cox – CE; Cameron Cullen – HB, FE; Andrew Dale – SR; Mitch Day – HK; Aleki Falepaini – SR; Alex Farrell – SR	Andrew Gay – CE; Chris Gesch (c) – SR; Matt Hackett – SR; Rex Johnson – HB; Ben Jones – CE, FE; Ryan Kinlyside – PR; Brad Lupi – PR; Tyson Martin – SR; Kelvin Nielsen – SR; Josh Osborne – PR; Jordan Pereira – WG	Zac Radel – PR; Steve Rapira – SR; Buchanan Rawhiti – WG; Michael Sio – HK; Tone Susuga – PR; Justin Tavae – WG; Liam Taylor (c) – FB; Brenden Treston – SR; Pulou Vaituutuu – PR; Zack Walker – PR	Head coach: Kim Williams; Legend: (c) Captain(s); (vc) Vice-captain(s)

== Squad movement ==
=== Gains ===
Player	Signed from	Until end of	Notes
Gavin Bennion	Warrington Wolves	2015	
Joss Boyton	Muswellbrook Rams	2015	
Sam Clune	Thirroul Butchers	2015	
Corey Cox	Dubbo CYMS	2015	
Cameron Cullen	Redcliffe Dolphins	2015	
Rex Johnson	Souths Logan Magpies	2015	
Ben Jones	Newtown Jets (mid-season)	2015	
Brad Lupi	North Sydney Bears	2015	
Jordan Pereira	Willagee Bears	2015	
Steve Rapira	Salford Red Devils	2015	
Michael Sio	Warriors	2015	

=== Losses ===
Player	Signed from	Until end of	Notes
Daniel Beasley	Townsville Blackhawks	2015	
Ross Bella	North Queensland Cowboys	2015	
Josh Benjamin	Redcliffe Dolphins	2015	
Karl Davies	Bradford Bulls	2015	
Doug Hewitt	Tweed Heads Seagulls	2015	
Michael Koko	Easts Tigers	2015	
Dan Murphy	Sunshine Coast Falcons	2015	
Dave Petersen	Bradford Bulls	2015	
Jason Schirnack	Canterbury-Bankstown Bulldogs	2015	
Michael Sio	Wakefield Trinity (mid-season)	2017	
James Uhatafe	Released	–	
Chris Ulugia	Bradford Bulls	2015	
Brentt Warr	Easts Tigers	2015	
Dean Webster	Released	–	

== Fixtures ==
=== Regular season ===
Date	Round	Opponent	Venue	Score	Tries	Goals
Saturday, 7 March	Round 1	Townsville Blackhawks	Jack Manski Oval	16 – 30	Chudleigh, Martin, Pereira	Johnson (2)
Saturday, 14 March	Round 2	Tweed Heads Seagulls	Stadium Mackay	34 – 18	Chudleigh (2), Cullen, Martin, Moga, Tavae, Walker	Johnson (3)
Saturday, 21 March	Round 3	Wynnum Manly Seagulls	BMD Kougari Oval	28 – 10	Chudleigh (2), Cullen, Falepaini, Tavae	Johnson (4)
Saturday, 28 March	Round 4	Easts Tigers	Stadium Mackay	30 – 8	Cullen (3), Sio (2)	Johnson (5)
Saturday, 4 April	Round 5	Norths Devils	Stadium Mackay	13 – 12	Clune (2), Tavae	Taylor (1 FG)
Saturday, 11 April	Round 6	Central Queensland Capras	Browne Park	14 – 12	Cullen, Rawhiti	Taylor (3)
Sunday, 19 April	Round 7	PNG Hunters	Kalabond Oval	24 – 26	Chudleigh (2), Clune, Taylor	Taylor (4)
	Round 8	Bye				
Sunday, 10 May	Round 9	Sunshine Coast Falcons	Stadium Mackay	50 – 16	Chudleigh, Falepaini, Hoare, Lupi, Pereira, Sio, Tavae, Treston, Walker	Taylor (7)
Saturday, 16 May	Round 10	Ipswich Jets	Stadium Mackay	20 – 36	Cullen (2), Pereira, Tavae	Taylor (2)
Sunday, 24 May	Round 11	Burleigh Bears	Pizzey Park	22 – 23	Clune, Falepaini, Martin, Walker	Taylor (3)
Sunday, 31 May	Round 12	Northern Pride	Barlow Park	12 – 10	Pereira	Taylor (2)
Friday, 5 June	Round 13	Townsville Blackhawks	Stadium Mackay	12 – 14	Pereira, Rawhiti	Taylor (2)
Saturday, 13 June	Round 14	Redcliffe Dolphins	Stadium Mackay	28 – 18	Hess (2), Pereira, Rawhiti, Treston	Taylor (4)
Sunday, 21 June	Round 15	Easts Tigers	Langlands Park	16 – 30	Lupi, Martin, Taylor	Taylor (2)
Saturday, 27 June	Round 16	Wynnum Manly Seagulls	Stadium Mackay	16 – 26	Clune, Cullen, Vaituutuu	Taylor (2)
Saturday, 4 July	Round 17	Sunshine Coast Falcons	Sunshine Coast Stadium	32 – 14	Rawhiti (2), Chudleigh, Clune, Pereira, Tavae	Taylor (4)
	Round 18	Bye				
Saturday, 18 July	Round 19	Burleigh Bears	Stadium Mackay	46 – 4	Chudleigh (2), Gesch, Jones, Martin, Pereira, Treston, Uele	Taylor (7)
Sunday, 26 July	Round 20	Redcliffe Dolphins	Dolphin Oval	18 – 40	Chudleigh (2), Falepaini	Taylor (3)
Sunday, 2 August	Round 21	Tweed Heads Seagulls	Piggabeen Sports Complex	20 – 24	Chudleigh, Tavae, Taylor, Walker	Taylor (2)
Saturday, 8 August	Round 22	Northern Pride	Stadium Mackay	22 – 26	Clune, Jones, Pereira, Taylor	Taylor (3)
Saturday, 15 August	Round 23	Norths Devils	Dalby Leagues Ground	28 – 40	Clune (2), Falepaini, Martin, Rawhiti	Taylor (4)
Saturday, 22 August	Round 24	PNG Hunters	Stadium Mackay	28 – 28	Chudleigh (2), Gay, Pereira, Wright	Taylor (4)
Saturday, 29 August	Round 25	Souths Logan Magpies	Brandon Park	18 – 32	Atherton, Clune, Taylor	Taylor (3)
Legend: Win Loss Draw Bye

== Statistics ==
Denotes player contracted to the North Queensland Cowboys for the 2015 season

Name	App	T	G	FG	Pts
John Asiata	3	-	-	-	-
Blake Atheron	4	1	-	-	4
Gavin Bennion	2	-	-	-	-
Joss Boyton	17	-	-	-	-
Josh Chudleigh	19	16	-	-	64
Sam Clune	22	10	-	-	40
Cameron Cullen	19	9	-	-	36
Andrew Dale	1	-	-	-	-
Mitch Day	9	-	-	-	-
Aleki Falepaini	21	5	-	-	20
Andrew Gay	3	1	-	-	4
Chris Gesch	22	1	-	-	4
Coen Hess	3	2	-	-	8
Sam Hoare	10	1	-	-	4
Rex Johnson	5	-	14	-	28
Ben Jones	11	2	-	-	8
Ryan Kinlyside	12	-	-	-	-
Rory Kostjasyn	3	-	-	-	-
Brad Lupi	23	2	-	-	8
Tyson Martin	22	6	-	-	24
Tautau Moga	2	1	-	-	4
Kelvin Nielsen	10	-	-	-	-
Justin O'Neill	1	-	-	-	-
Josh Osborne	9	-	-	-	-
Jordan Pereira	21	11	-	-	44
Steve Rapira	5	-	-	-	-
Buchanan Rawhiti	16	6	-	-	24
Michael Sio	13	3	-	-	12
Justin Tavae	22	7	-	-	28
Liam Taylor	19	5	61	1	143
Brenden Treston	17	3	-	-	12
Braden Uele	3	1	-	-	4
Pulou Vaituutuu	12	1	-	-	4
Zack Walker	9	4	-	-	16
Matthew Wright	1	1	-	-	4
Totals		99	75	1	547

== Honours ==
=== League ===
- Hooker of the Year: Josh Chudleigh
