= Jesse Royal =

Jesse Royal may refer to:

- Jesse Royal (rugby league)
- Jesse Royal (musician)
