= Kaipara College =

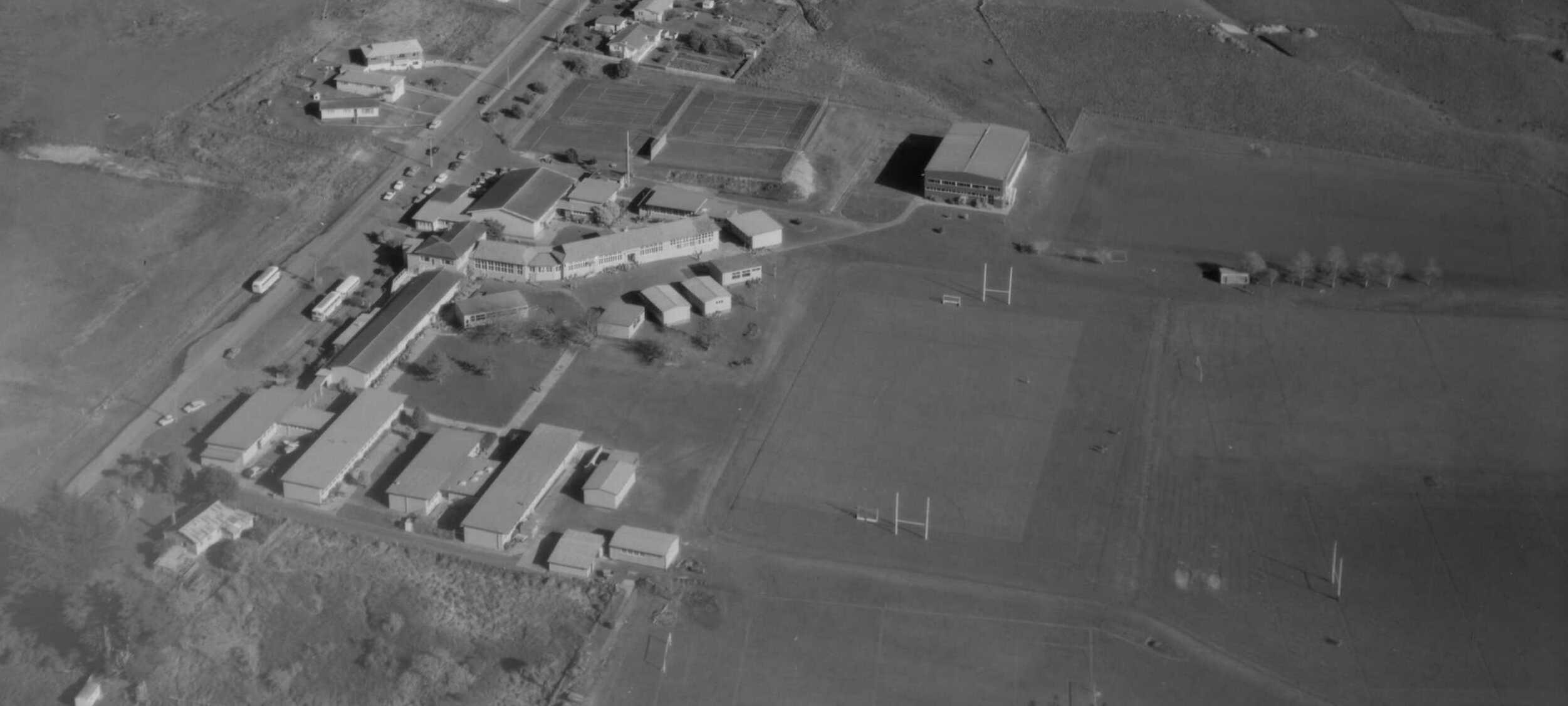
- Aerial view of Kaipara College in 1983

Location
- 36 Rautawhiri Road, Helensville, Rodney District, Auckland, New Zealand; 36°40′49″S 174°27′34″E

Information
- Type: State Co-Ed Secondary (Year 9–13)
- Motto: Eke Panuku, Eke Tangaroa "Navigate to Success"
- Established: 1924
- Ministry of Education Institution no.: 26
- Principal: Jane Coup
- Enrolment: 721 (July 2026)
- Socio-economic decile: 7O
- Website: kaipara.school.nz

Kaipara College is a secondary school in Helensville, New Zealand. The current principal, as of the start of 2026, is Jane Coup.

== History ==
The school began as Helensville District High School in 1924, and changed its name to Kaipara College in 1959.

In December 2006 a fire destroyed the last remaining original classrooms at the school along with years of archives. Since this fire, the school has been under reconstruction. Various blocks have been rebuilt over this period with the science, English, social sciences and, math blocks all having been rebuilt over this period. There were more plans for the college to be reconstructed further however a plan for a new tech and arts centre was significantly scaled down in 2024 amid a freeze in funding by the then incoming National government.

Kaipara College celebrated its 100 year anniversary with centennial celebrations on the 20th - 22 September 2024. Activities involved an Ag day, a fundraising golf event, a school memorabilia exhibition, a morning tea, guided school tours, and a dinner with live entertainment.

== Style of education ==
Kaipara College employs a mid-range teacher to student ratio, with around the 20–30 students per class mark. However this figure can fluctuate throughout the school year as students leave and classes remain unchanged.

The school also has its own tuck shop which is run by Helensville District Health Trust and the food is prepared at Te Whare Oranga ō Parakai.

== Enrolment ==
As of July 2026, Kaipara College has a roll of 721 students, of which 229 (31.8%) identify as Māori.

As of 2026, the school has an Equity Index of 460, placing it amongst schools whose students have average socioeconomic barriers to achievement (roughly equivalent to deciles 5 and 6 under the former socio-economic decile system).

== Notable alumni ==
Notable alumni include All Black Tony Woodcock and rugby league player Daniel O'Regan.
