= Jazz Tevaga =

Samoa international rugby league footballer

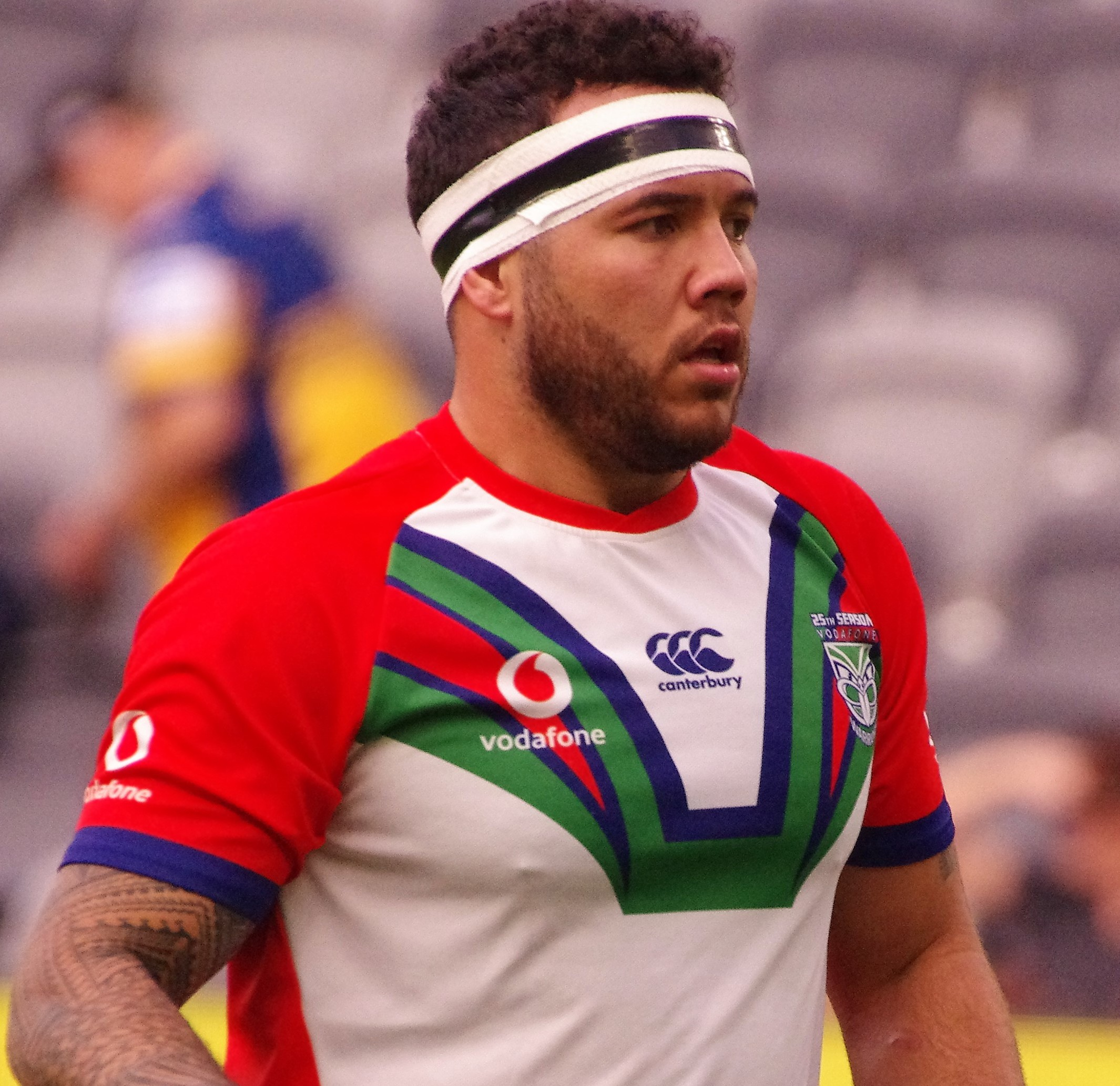

Personal information
- Full name: Jazz Iosefa Tevaga
- Born: 4 September 1995 (age 31) Christchurch, Canterbury, New Zealand
- Height: 5 ft 10 in (1.78 m)
- Weight: 15 st 6 lb (98 kg)

Playing information
- Position: Loose forward, Hooker
Club
Years	Team	Pld	T	G	FG	P
2016–24	New Zealand Warriors	138	9	0	0	36
2025	Manly Sea Eagles	24	0	0	0	0
2026–	Wakefield Trinity	24	4	0	0	16
	Total	186	13	0	0	52
Representative
Years	Team	Pld	T	G	FG	P
2017–	Samoa	13	1	0	0	4
2022–24	Māori All Stars	3	0	0	0	0
- Source: As of 17 November 2026

Jazz Iosefa Tevaga (born 4 September 1995) is a Samoa international rugby league footballer who plays as a loose forward and hooker for Wakefield Trinity in the Super League.

He has previously played for New Zealand Warriors and Manly Sea Eagles in the NRL.

== Early years ==
Tevaga was born in Christchurch, New Zealand, and is of Samoan, Māori and European descent.

Tevaga played his junior football for the Burnham Chevaliers in Christchurch and Papakura Sea Eagles in Auckland and he attended Papakura High School, where he played in the 2013 National Secondary School championship and was selected for the tournament team.

== Playing career ==
=== Holden Cup ===
In January 2014, Tevaga attended a Junior Warriors training camp as an open trialist before being signed by the New Zealand Warriors, and playing in the Holden Cup. On 5 October 2014, Tevaga played at lock in the Warriors 2014 Holden Cup grand final winning team who beat the Brisbane Broncos 34-32. In 2015 he played both for the Junior Warriors (where he was co-captain) and in the NSW Cup. On 2 May 2015, Tevaga played for the Junior Kiwis against the Junior Kangaroos, starting at lock in the 22-20 loss at Cbus Super Stadium.

Originally a lock, Tevaga was converted to a hooker during the 2014 season as he was considered too small for the lock position.

=== 2016 ===
In Round 3 of the 2016 NRL season, Tevaga made his debut for the New Zealand Warriors against the Melbourne Storm as a replacement for an injured Issac Luke in the Warriors 21-14 loss at Mt Smart Stadium. Tevaga became Warrior #209, and played 59 minutes due to an injury to bench hooker Nathaniel Roache.

=== 2017 ===
He played just 4 NRL games for the Warriors in 2017.

He represented Samoa in the 2017 Rugby League World Cup and played all four games as the starting hooker, scoring a try in their loss to Tonga.

=== 2018 ===
In 2018 he cemented a position as a bench hooker for the Warriors, filling in for the starting 9 Issac Luke. He appeared in 20 games, 19 of which from the bench. His performance as a specialist bench player was rewarded at the 2018 Dally M Awards when he was given the first Interchange Player Of The Year award.

=== 2019 ===
Tevaga made 22 appearances for New Zealand in the 2019 NRL season as the club missed out on the finals.

=== 2020 ===
Tevaga made 12 appearances for New Zealand in the 2020 NRL season as the club once again missed out on the finals.

=== 2021 ===
In the final round of the 2021 NRL season, Tevaga was sent to the sin bin for fighting in the club's 44-0 loss against the Gold Coast.

=== 2022 ===
Tevaga made a total of 17 appearances for the New Zealand club in the 2022 NRL season as they finished 15th on the table.

=== 2023 ===
Tevaga played eleven games for the New Zealand Warriors in the 2023 NRL season as the club finished 4th on the table and qualified for the finals. He played in all three finals games as the club reached the preliminary final before being defeated by Brisbane.

=== 2024 ===
On 1 August 2024, it was announced that Tevaga would be leaving the New Zealand Warriors at the end of the season. He made 19 appearances for the New Zealand Warriors in the 2024 NRL season which saw the club finish 13th on the table. On 11 October 2024, Tevaga signed with the Manly Warringah Sea Eagles for the 2025 season.

=== 2025 ===
Tevaga played every game for Manly in the 2025 NRL season as the club missed the finals. Tevaga would leave Manly at the end of the season and sign with Wakefield Trinity on a 2-year deal. On 5 July, Tevaga confirmed his two year deal with Wakefield.

=== 2026 ===
Tevaga played in the 2026 Super League Grand Final victory over Warrington, scoring a decisive try late in the first half. He finished the season with five tries and one assist. He was subsequently called up for Samoa's World Cup squad.

== Statistics ==
Year	Team	Games	Tries	Pts
2016	New Zealand Warriors	11	1	4
2017	New Zealand Warriors	4		
2018	New Zealand Warriors	20	1	4
2019	New Zealand Warriors	22	2	8
2020	New Zealand Warriors	12	1	4
2021	New Zealand Warriors	22	1	4
2022	New Zealand Warriors	17	1	4
2023	New Zealand Warriors	11	1	4
2024	New Zealand Warriors	19	1	4
2025	Manly Warringah Sea Eagles	24		
2026	Wakefield Trinity	24	4	16
2027	Wakefield Trinity			
	Totals	186	13	52
