= Michaela Peck =

Australian rugby league footballer, born 1994

Personal information
- Born: 21 April 1994 (age 30); Brisbane, Queensland, Australia
- Height: 160 cm (5 ft 3 in)
- Weight: 67 kg (10 st 8 lb)

Playing information
- Position: Hooker
Club
Years	Team	Pld	T	G	FG	P
2020–	New Zealand Warriors	2	0	0	0	0
Representative
Years	Team	Pld	T	G	FG	P
2018–19	Prime Minister's XIII	2	1	0	0	4
- Source: RLP As of 19 February 2021

Michaela Peck (born 21 April 1994) is an Australian rugby league footballer who plays as a hooker for the New Zealand Warriors in the NRL Women's Premiership and the Valkyries in the QRL Women's Premiership.

== Background ==
Peck was born in Brisbane, Queensland and played her junior rugby league for the Stanley River Wolves.

== Playing career ==
In 2014, Peck played for the Beerwah Bulldogs in the Brisbane and District Women's Rugby League Division 1, playing in their Grand Final loss to the Souths Logan Magpies.

In 2018, Peck joined the Cronulla-Sutherland Sharks in the NSWRL Women's Premiership. In June 2018, while in the Royal Australian Navy, she represented the Australian Defence Force at the Women's National Championships. On 6 October 2018, she played for the Prime Minister's XIII in their win over Papua New Guinea.

In 2019, Peck joined for the Wests Panthers, and later that year, played in the Gold Coast Titans Women's Invitational. On 11 October 2019, she again represented the Prime Minister's XIII, scoring a try in their win over Fiji.

In September 2020, Peck joined the New Zealand Warriors NRL Women's Premiership team. In Round 2 of the 2020 NRLW season, she made her debut for the Roosters in their 22–12 loss to the Sydney Roosters. At the end of the season, she won the Warriors' Club Person of the Year award.

In 2021, Peck played for the Valkyries in the QRL Women's Premiership, captaining the side.

== Achievements and accolades ==
=== Individual ===
- New Zealand Warriors Club Person of the Year: 2020
