= Taimane Levu =

Australian rugby league footballer (born 1997)

Personal information
- Full name: Taimane Levu
- Born: 25 May 1997 (age 28) Brisbane, Queensland, Australia
- Height: 172 cm (5 ft 8 in)
- Weight: 101 kg (15 st 13 lb)

Playing information
- Position: Prop
Club
Years	Team	Pld	T	G	FG	P
2020–	New Zealand Warriors	2	0	0	0	0
Representative
Years	Team	Pld	T	G	FG	P
2019	Samoa	1	0	0	0	0
2019	Prime Minister's XIII	1	0	0	0	0
- Source: RLP As of 19 February 2021

Taimane Levu (born 25 May 1997) is an Australian rugby league footballer who primarily plays as a prop for the New Zealand Warriors in the NRL Women's Premiership and Wests Panthers in the QRL Women's Premiership.

== Background ==
Levu was born in Brisbane, Queensland and played her junior rugby league for the Inala Panthers.

== Playing career ==
In May 2019, Levu represented South East Queensland at the Women's National Championships. On 22 June 2019, Levu represented Fetu Samoa in their 46–8 loss to New Zealand. On 11 October 2019, she started at prop for the Prime Minister's XIII in their win over Fiji.

=== 2020 ===
In 2020, Levu played for Ipswich Brothers in the QRL Women's Premiership and later played for the Wests Panthers in the Holcim Cup.

On 18 September, Levu joined the New Zealand Warriors NRL Women's Premiership team. In Round 1 of the 2020 NRLW season, she made her debut for the Warriors in a 28–14 loss to the Brisbane Broncos.
