= Naomi Kara =

New Zealand rugby league footballer

Personal information
- Born: 18 June 1986 (age 38); Cambridge, New Zealand
- Height: 170 cm (5 ft 7 in)
- Weight: 65 kg (10 st 3 lb)

Playing information
- Position: Halfback
Club
Years	Team	Pld	T	G	FG	P
2020–	New Zealand Warriors	1	0	0	0	0
- Source: RLP As of 19 February 2021

Naomi Kara (born 18 June 1986) is a New Zealand rugby league footballer who plays as a halfback for the New Zealand Warriors in the NRL Women's Premiership.

== Background ==
Born in Cambridge, New Zealand, Kara played her junior rugby league for the Cambridge Raiders and the Runaway Bay Seagulls. Her younger brother Kurt is a former New Zealand Māori representative.

== Playing career ==
In 2017, Kara played Greenacre Tigers in the NSWRL Women's Premiership. In 2019 and 2020, she played for the Wests Tigers.

In September 2020, she joined the New Zealand Warriors NRL Women's Premiership team. In Round 3 of the 2020 NRLW season, Kara made her debut for the Warriors, starting at halfback in a 22–10 win over the St George Illawarra Dragons.
