= Laken Paitai =

New Zealand rugby league footballer, born 2000

Personal information
- Born: 19 November 2000 (age 24); Ōtāhuhu, Auckland, New Zealand
- Height: 178 cm (5 ft 10 in)
- Weight: 81 kg (12 st 11 lb)

Playing information
- Position: Centre, Second-row
Club
| Years | Team | Pld | T | G | FG | P |
|---|---|---|---|---|---|---|
| 2020– | New Zealand Warriors | 1 | 0 | 0 | 0 | 0 |
Representative
| Years | Team | Pld | T | G | FG | P |
| 2019 | Prime Minister's XIII | 1 | 0 | 0 | 0 | 0 |
- Source: RLP As of 19 February 2021

Laken Paitai (born 19 November 2000) is a New Zealand rugby league footballer who plays as a centre for the New Zealand Warriors in the NRL Women's Premiership and the Burleigh Bears in the QRL Women's Premiership.

== Background ==
Born in Otahuhu, New Zealand, Paitai grew up in Gladstone, Queensland, where she played her junior rugby league for Valleys Gladstone.

== Playing career ==
In 2018 and 2019, while playing for the Burleigh Bears, Paitai represented South East Queensland at the Women's National Championships. On 111 October 2019, she represented the Prime Minister's XIII in their 22–14 win over Fiji.

In September 2020, Paitai joined the New Zealand Warriors NRL Women's Premiership squad. In Round 3 of the 2020 NRLW season, she made her debut for the Warriors in a 22–10 win over the St George Illawarra Dragons.
