= Sam Rapira =

New Zealand international rugby league footballer

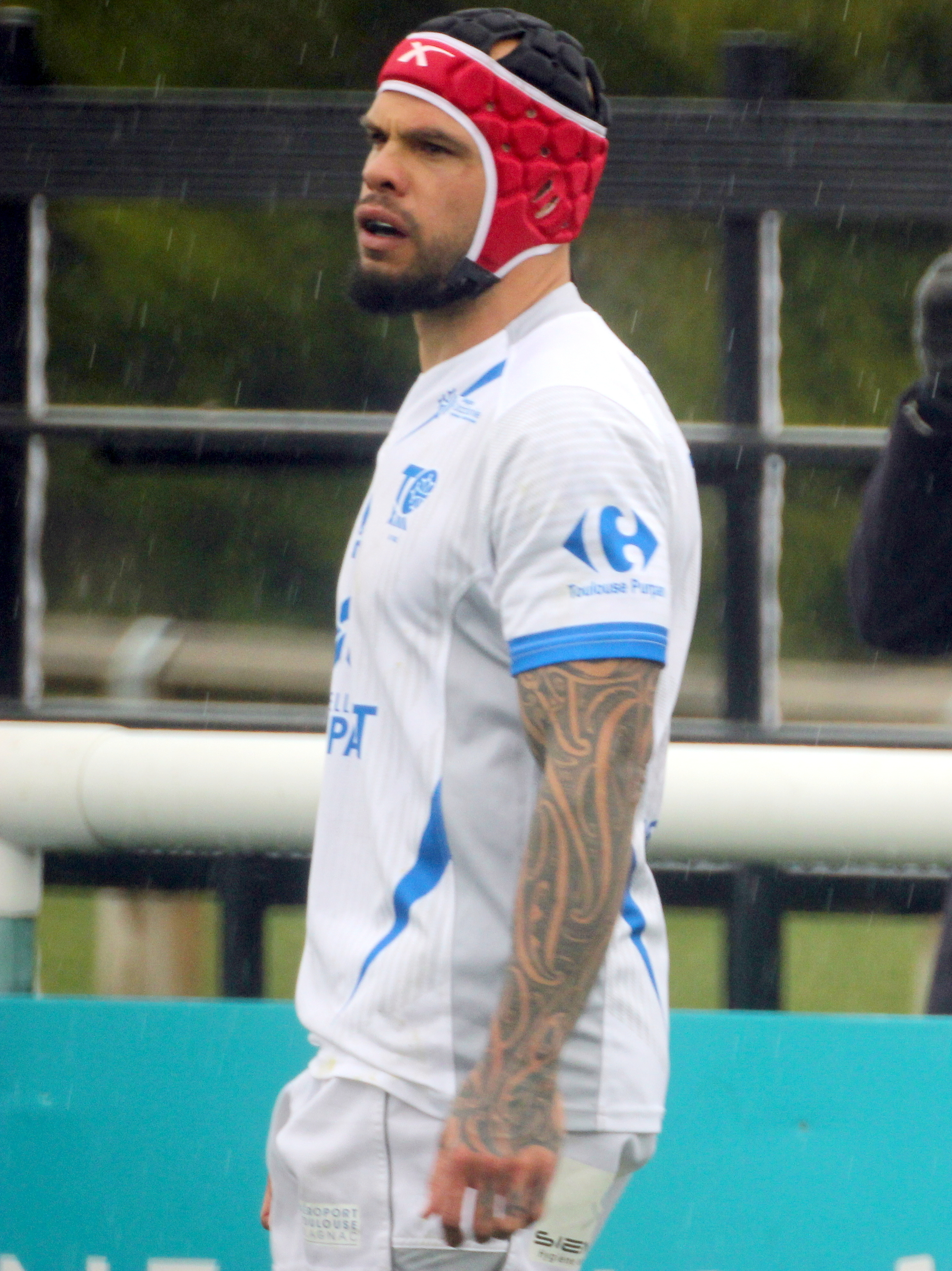

Personal information
- Born: 8 April 1987 (age 39) Hamilton, New Zealand

Playing information
- Height: 1.84 m (6 ft 1/2 in)
- Weight: 110 kg (17 st 5 lb)
- Position: Prop
Club
| Years | Team | Pld | T | G | FG | P |
|---|---|---|---|---|---|---|
| 2006–15 | New Zealand Warriors | 173 | 14 | 0 | 0 | 56 |
| 2016–17 | Huddersfield Giants | 43 | 3 | 0 | 0 | 12 |
| 2018 | Toulouse Olympique | 14 | 0 | 0 | 0 | 0 |
| | Total | 230 | 17 | 0 | 0 | 68 |
Representative
| Years | Team | Pld | T | G | FG | P |
| 2007–11 | New Zealand | 13 | 0 | 0 | 0 | 0 |
| | New Zealand Māori |
- Education: Hamilton Boys' High School
- Relatives: Steve Rapira (brother)

Sam Rapira (born 8 April 1987) is a New Zealand former professional rugby league footballer who last played for Toulouse Olympique in the Championship. He played as a prop.

A New Zealand international representative he previously played in the National Rugby League for the New Zealand Warriors and the Huddersfield Giants in the Super League. Rapira was also part of the New Zealand team that won the 2008 World Cup.

== Background ==
Rapira was in Hamilton, New Zealand.

== Early years ==
The older brother of Steve, Sam Rapira attended Hamilton Boys' High School and played for the Hukanui club. He later played for the Waicoa Bay Stallions in the Bartercard Cup. Rapira first made the Junior Kiwis in 2004, and played for them again in 2005. Also in 2005 he was named in the New Zealand Residents squad.

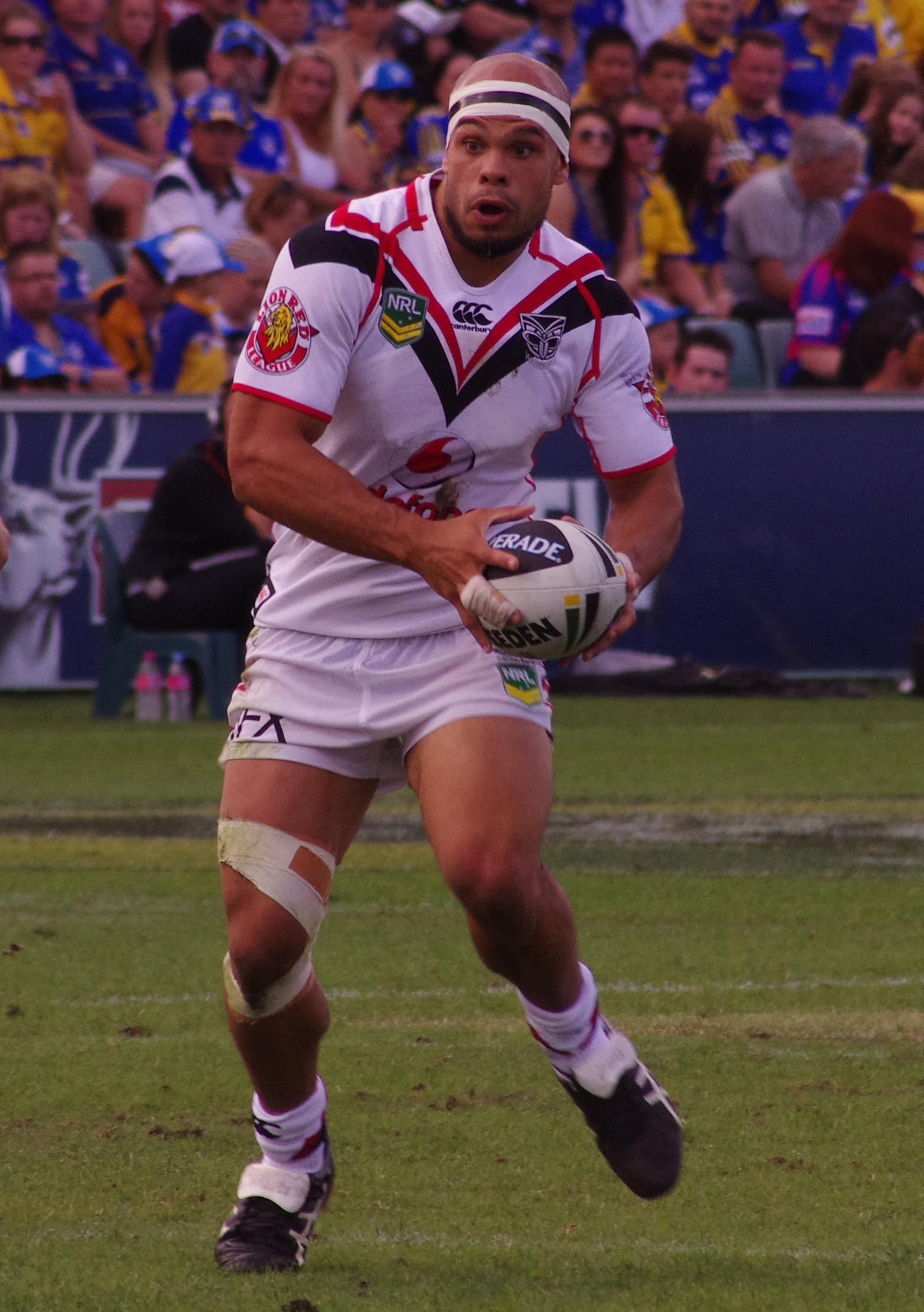
Rapira playing for the Warriors in 2013

== Playing career ==
=== New Zealand Warriors ===
Rapira made his NRL debut for the Warriors in 2006 against the Wests Tigers.

In 2007 he played in all 26 games for the club.

In 2011 Rapira extended his contract with the club until the end of the 2014 season. Rapira announced that he was leaving the Warriors at the end of the 2015 NRL season to join the Huddersfield Giants on a two season deal from 2016

=== Huddersfield Giants ===
Rapira spent the 2016 and 2017 seasons playing for the Huddersfield Giants in the Super League.

=== Toulouse Olympique ===
Rapira joined Toulouse ahead of the 2018 season.

=== International career ===
In 2006 he played for New Zealand 'A'.

Rapira was first selected to play for the New Zealand national team from the interchange bench in the 2007 ANZAC Test loss against Australia.

In August 2008, Rapira was named in the New Zealand training squad for the 2008 World Cup, and in October 2008, he was named in the final 24-man Kiwi squad. He was part of the team that won the World Cup Final.

For the 2010 Anzac Test, Rapira was selected to play for New Zealand at prop forward in their loss against Australia.
