= Denan Kemp =

Australian rugby union and rugby league footballer

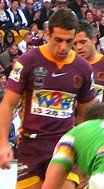

Personal information
- Full name: Denan Kemp
- Born: 11 May 1987 (age 39) Gold Coast, Queensland, Australia
- Height: 180 cm (5 ft 11 in)
- Weight: 92 kg (14 st 7 lb)

Playing information

Rugby league
- Position: Wing, Fullback
Club
Years	Team	Pld	T	G	FG	P
2007–08	Brisbane Broncos	28	20	0	0	80
2009	New Zealand Warriors	11	1	21	0	46
2010	Brisbane Broncos	4	1	0	0	4
	Total	43	22	21	0	130

Rugby union
Club
Years	Team	Pld	T	G	FG	P
2011	Southern Districts			0	0
- Source: As of 14 Sep 2022

Denan Kemp is an Australian former professional rugby league footballer who played in the 2000s and 2010s in the National Rugby League (NRL) and a current online sports content creator. Kemp played in the NRL for the Brisbane Broncos and the New Zealand Warriors, usually on the wing. He also had a brief stint in rugby union in 2011, playing for Southern Districts in the Shute Shield competition.

Post football Kemp launched his own podcast and beer company, which has seen him described as "one of the most influential, Rugby League online content creators."

== Early years ==
Kemp attended St Michael's College, Merrimac. Kemp went on to play rugby league with the Brisbane Wests in the Queensland Cup before joining Brisbane Broncos feeder club, the Toowoomba Clydesdales where he played on the wing in their 2006 Queensland Cup Grand Final defeat. He then was transferred to the Aspley Broncos in 2007 by the Brisbane Broncos.

== Brisbane ==
Kemp made his first grade debut for the Broncos in round 10 of the 2007 NRL season, against the Manly-Warringah Sea Eagles. During the game Kemp scored an individual 75 metre try. This try was voted as the third best of the 2007 NRL season by NRL.com.

In 2008, Kemp started the season strongly coming up with four tries in his first three games. He went on to play 24 games for the club in 2008. In round 12 he scored 4 tries while playing against the Parramatta Eels, placing him equal second on most tries scored in a game for the club. The record came just hours after he had announced that he was joining the New Zealand Warriors for the 2009 season. When not selected for the first grade side, Kemp turned out for the Norths Devils in the Queensland Cup.

Kemp was Brisbane's top try-scorer in 2008 and was named the club's rookie of the year.

== New Zealand Warriors ==
On 28 May 2008, the New Zealand Warriors announced that they had signed Kemp for the 2009 and 2010 seasons. Whilst at the Warriors he took on goal-kicking responsibilities for the club for the first half of the 2009 season.

In round 2 of the 2009 season, Kemp kicked the match winning conversion from the sideline to defeat the Manly-Warringah Sea Eagles with 28 seconds left. However, for much of the season Kemp could not break into the first grade side, instead he was assigned to Otahuhu and played for the Auckland Vulcans in the NSW Cup. Near the end of the season he asked for a release so he could return to Queensland to rebuild his National Rugby League career. Kemp played in eleven games for the Warriors, scoring 46 points. 2009 was also the first year Kemp was featured on NRL cards, featuring in both Select & Daily Telegraph sets.

== Second stint with Brisbane ==
On 16 September 2009, Kemp announced that he re-signed with the Brisbane Broncos for the 2010 NRL season, after being granted an early release from the final year of his contract with the Warriors. An injury prevented him from claiming a full-time spot in the first grade side. In round 1 2010, against the North Queensland Cowboys, he scored the final try which won the game for the Broncos 30-24. He played for the Wynnum Manly Seagulls in the 2011 Queensland Cup, before joining the Australian Rugby Union in April 2011.

== Rugby union ==
In April 2011 Kemp signed a contract with the Australian Rugby Union and was a part of the Australian Sevens squad that traveled to London for the IRB Sevens.

Kemp turned out during the 2011 season for the Southern Districts Rugby Club side in Sydney's Shute Shield.

== St George Illawarra ==
On 20 November 2011, Kemp signed for one year with the St George Illawarra Dragons in 2012. Kemp played in the 2012 Charity Shield game for the Dragons, but never took the field in a first-grade game, as he was mainly relegated to the club's NSW Cup side, the Illawarra Cutters.

== Third stint with Brisbane ==
On 18 January 2013, Kemp signed a one-year deal to return to the Broncos in hopes of another revival of his career. However, he failed to play a single game for the Broncos throughout the entire 2013 NRL season, and was released at the season's end.

== Media and Post Rugby League ==
Since Kemp's retirement from Rugby League at the end of 2013, he has built a popular Rugby League Facebook Page and Podcast known as 'The Locker Room'. Kemp launched 'The Locker Room' podcast on 9 June 2015 with popular rugby league star Beau Ryan. Kemp has also launched a beer brand 'Bloke in a Bar' across Australia which was successfully launched during the COVID-19 pandemic.
