= Andrew Gay =

Wales international rugby league footballer

Personal information
- Born: 5 October 1989 (age 37) Sydney, New South Wales, Australia
- Height: 173 cm (5 ft 8 in)
- Weight: 77 kg (170 lb; 12 st 2 lb)

Playing information
- Position: Fullback, Wing, Centre, Five-eighth, Halfback
Club
Years	Team	Pld	T	G	FG	P
2010–11	South Wales Scorpions	42	26	0	0	104
2017	South Wales Ironmen	24	4	0	1	17
	Total	66	30	0	1	121
Representative
Years	Team	Pld	T	G	FG	P
2010–17	Wales	8	2	0	0	8
- Source: As of 1 February 2022

Andrew Gay (born 5 October 1989) is a Welsh international rugby league footballer who played semi-professionally for South Wales and represented the Welsh national team, most notably at the 2011 Four Nations and the 2017 World Cup. He played as a fullback, wing, centre or five-eighth.

== Background ==
Gay was born in Sydney and raised on the Central Coast of New South Wales, Australia. His father was born in Splott, Wales.

== Playing career ==
Gay made his debut for Wales in 2010.

In 2012, Gay joined the Mackay Cutters in the Queensland Cup.
