= Jordan Pereira (rugby league) =

New Zealand rugby league footballer (born 1993)

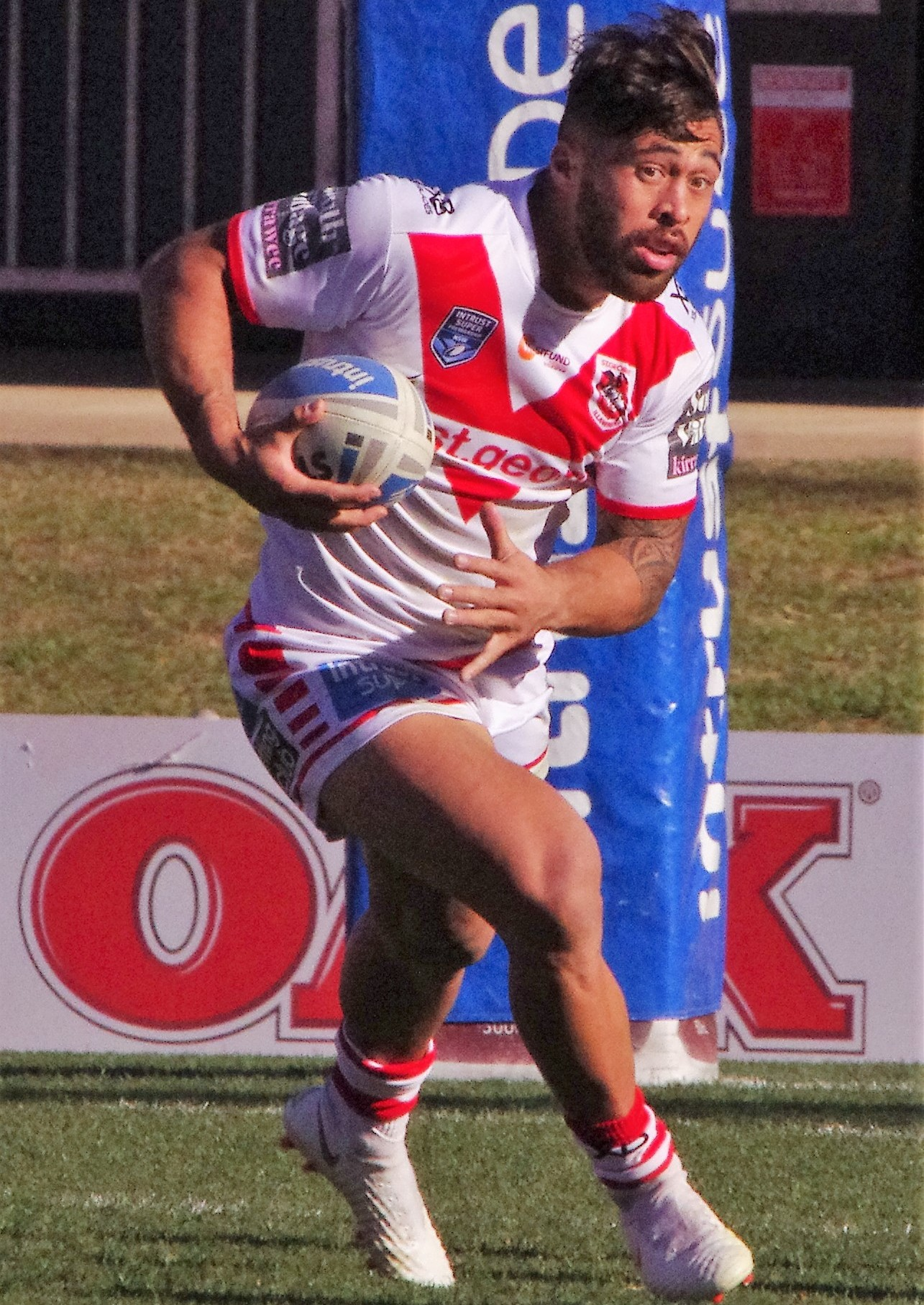

Personal information
- Full name: Jordan Pereira
- Born: 6 April 1993 (age 33) Lower Hutt, Wellington, New Zealand
- Height: 182 cm (6 ft 0 in)
- Weight: 97 kg (15 st 4 lb)

Playing information
- Position: Wing
Club
Years	Team	Pld	T	G	FG	P
2018–21	St. George Illawarra	39	10	0	0	40
2022–24	Brisbane Broncos	6	4	0	0	16
	Total	45	14	0	0	56
- Source: As of 31 August 2023

Jordan Pereira (born 6 April 1993) is a New Zealand former professional rugby league footballer who last played for the Brisbane Broncos in the National Rugby League (NRL).

He previously played for the St. George Illawarra Dragons in the NRL.

== Early life ==
Pereira was born in Lower Hutt, New Zealand to a Samoan father and English mother.

He played his junior rugby league for the Willagee Bears in Perth Rugby League.

== Early career ==
In 2014, Pereira went on to play in the QLD Intrust Super Cup for the Mackay Cutters. Midway through 2017, Pereira signed with the St. George Illawarra Dragons on an 18-month contract.

== Career ==
=== 2018 ===
In round 19 of the 2018 season, Pereira made his NRL debut against the North Queensland, scoring a try in St. George Illawarra's 24–10 win. Pereira played in both finals matches for St. George Illawarra in the 2018 NRL season which were against the Brisbane Broncos and South Sydney. St. George Illawarra defeated Brisbane in week one at Suncorp Stadium in a shock 48–18 victory. The following week, St. George Illawarra were defeated by Souths 13–12 at ANZ Stadium ending their season.

=== 2019 ===
Pereira made a total of 11 appearances in the 2019 NRL season and scored 5 tries as St. George Illawarra endured one of their worst ever seasons finishing in 15th position on the table.

=== 2020 ===
He made a total of 15 appearances in the 2020 NRL season scoring one try as St. George Illawarra finished 13th on the table and missed out on the finals.

=== 2021 ===
In round 7 of the 2021 NRL season, he was sent to the sin bin after hitting Sydney Roosters player James Tedesco in the head with a dangerous high tackle during the club's loss at the Sydney Cricket Ground. On 27 April, he was suspended for three matches over his dangerous high tackle on James Tedesco. On 18 June it was revealed that Pereira was in talks to make a mid-season switch to the Newcastle Knights before joining the Brisbane Broncos in 2022.

=== 2022 ===
Pereira played five games for Brisbane in the 2022 NRL season and scored two tries. Brisbane would finish the season in 9th place and miss the finals.

=== 2023 ===
In round 27 of the 2023 NRL season, Pereira was called into the Brisbane side for their final round of the year match against Melbourne. Pereira scored two tries as Brisbane lost 32–22.

=== 2024 ===
On 27 June 2024, Pereira announced his immediate retirement from rugby league, after having sustained nerve damage in his neck while playing for Broncos affiliate club Souths Logan Magpies.

== Personal life ==
On 28 May 2018, Pereira became engaged to his girlfriend Sarah Orange. They were married in late 2019 and have one child together, a boy born in January 2021.
