= Gavin Bennion =

Wales international rugby league footballer

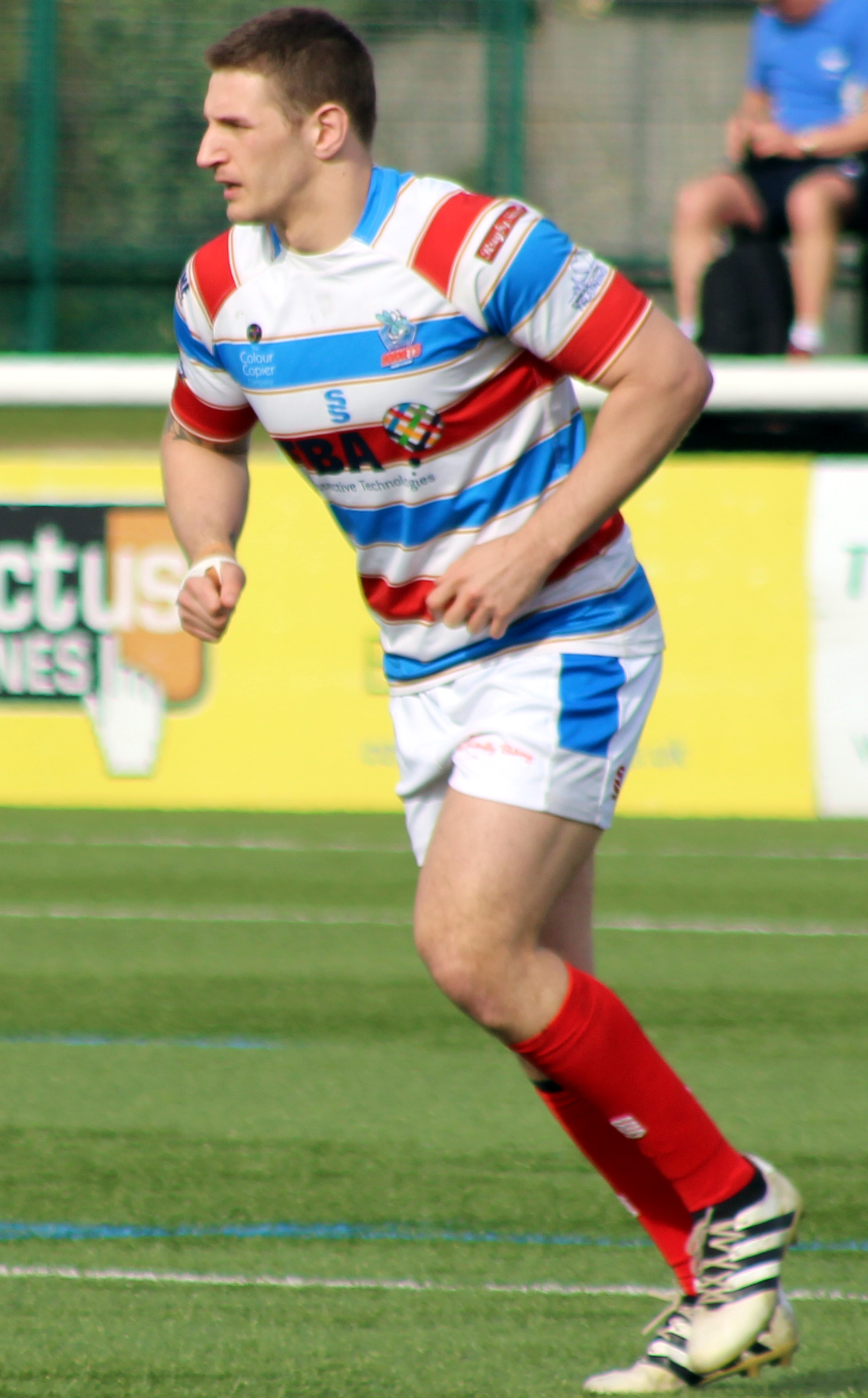

Personal information
- Born: 31 December 1993 (age 31) Warrington, Cheshire, England
- Height: 6 ft 5 in (1.96 m)
- Weight: 17 st 5 lb (110 kg)

Playing information
- Position: Prop, Second-row
Club
Years	Team	Pld	T	G	FG	P
2012–14	Warrington Wolves	0	0	0	0	0
2013(loan)	→ Swinton Lions	6	1	0	0	4
2014(loan)	→ Featherstone Rovers	1	0	0	0	0
2014(loan)	→ Swinton Lions	11	1	0	0	4
2016	Halifax	20	2	0	0	8
2017	Rochdale Hornets	28	1	0	0	4
2018	Salford Red Devils	2	0	0	0	0
2018(loan)	→ Swinton Lions	7	0	0	0	0
2018(loan)	→ Oldham	2	1	0	0	4
2018(loan)	→ Rochdale Hornets	4	0	0	0	0
2019–20	Swinton Lions	24	8	0	0	32
2021–22	Rochdale Hornets	20	5	0	0	20
2023–24	Swinton Lions	33	1	0	0	4
2025	Widnes Vikings	18	0	0	0	0
	Total	176	20	0	0	80
Representative
Years	Team	Pld	T	G	FG	P
2017–25	Wales	5	1	0	0	4
- Source: As of 28 November 2025

Gavin Bennion (born 31 December 1993) is a former Wales international rugby league footballer who last played as a prop or second-row for the Widnes Vikings in the RFL Championship.

== Background ==
Bennion was born in Warrington, Cheshire, England.

== Playing career ==
Bennion has previously played for the Mackay Cutters and spent time on loan at the Swinton Lions, Oldham RLFC and Featherstone Rovers.

=== Rochdale Hornets (re-join) ===
On 11 Jul 2020 it was reported that he had signed for Rochdale Hornets in the RFL League 1

=== Widnes Vikings ===
On 30 Oct 2024 it was reported that he had signed for Widnes Vikings in the RFL Championship on a 1-year deal.

On 28 November 2025 he announced his retirement from professional rugby

=== International career ===
He was selected in the Wales 9s squad for the 2019 Rugby League World Cup 9s.
