= Daniel O'Regan =

New Zealand rugby league footballer

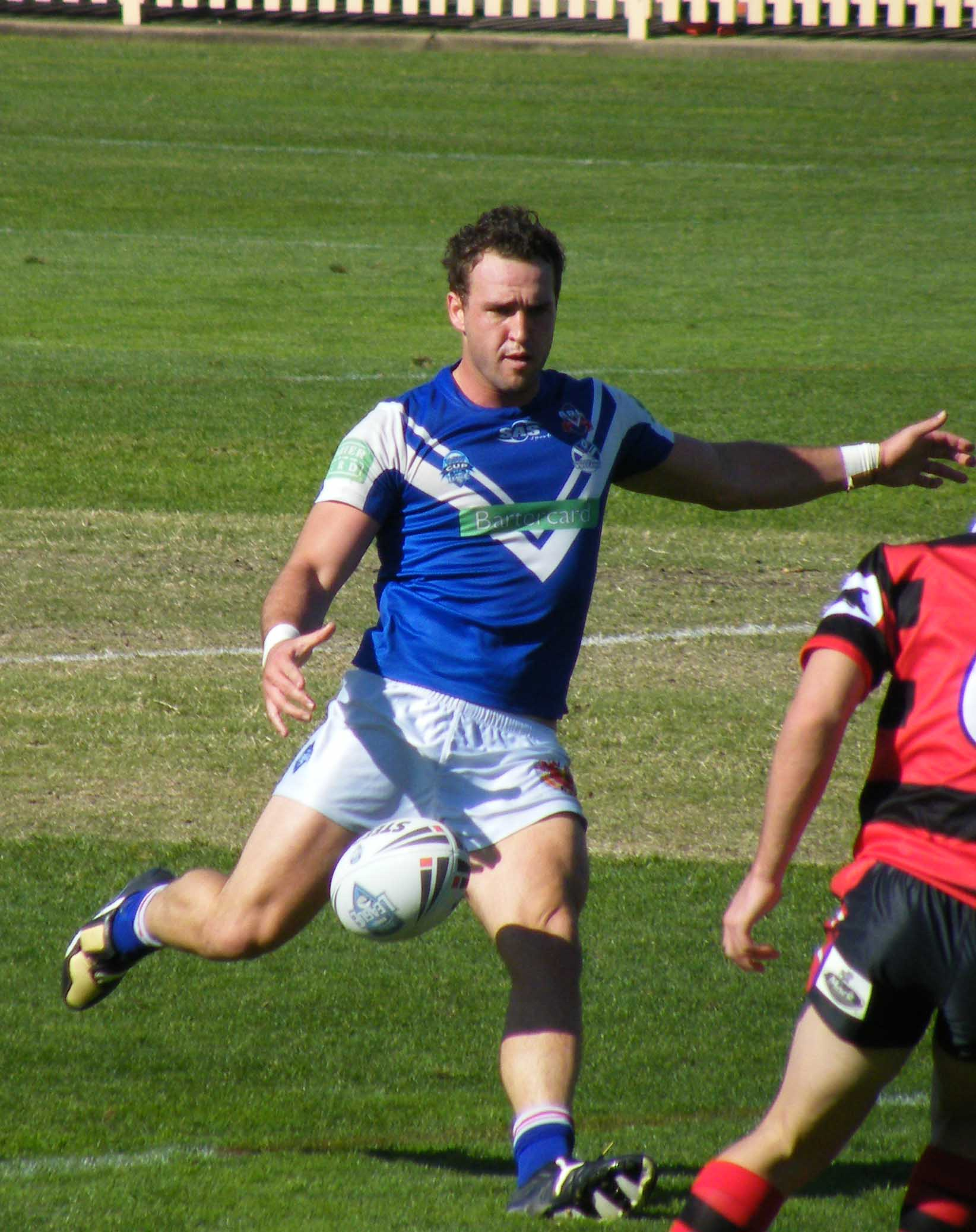

Personal information
- Born: 3 February 1988 (age 38) Auckland, New Zealand
- Height: 183 cm (6 ft 0 in)
- Weight: 97 kg (15 st 4 lb)

Playing information
- Position: Five-eighth, Lock
Club
| Years | Team | Pld | T | G | FG | P |
|---|---|---|---|---|---|---|
| 2009 | New Zealand Warriors | 1 | 0 | 0 | 0 | 0 |
- Source: As of 7 April 2009

Daniel O'Regan (born 3 February 1988 in Auckland, New Zealand) is a New Zealand rugby league footballer who last played for the New Zealand Warriors in the National Rugby League competition. His position of choice is at five-eighth. He is the nephew of former Kiwi Ron O'Regan.

== Early years ==
Educated at Kaipara College, and of Maori descent O'Regan played for the Mt Albert Lions in the Bartercard Cup as well as spending time at the Manurewa club, before signing with the New Zealand Warriors. In 2008 O'Regan played in the Toyota Cup and was the Junior Warriors inaugural captain. He played in twenty three matches and scored eleven tries.

== New Zealand Warriors ==
In 2009 he was part of the wider senior Warriors squad and played with the Auckland Vulcans in the NSW Cup. He made his first grade debut for the Warriors on 5 April 2009 against the South Sydney Rabbitohs, becoming the 150th player to play for the club.

== Melbourne Storm ==
In 2010, O'Regan joined the Melbourne Storm after the New Zealand Warriors did not renew his contract.

== International career ==
In 2005 O'Regan was a Junior Kiwi.
