= Steve Rapira =

New Zealand rugby league footballer

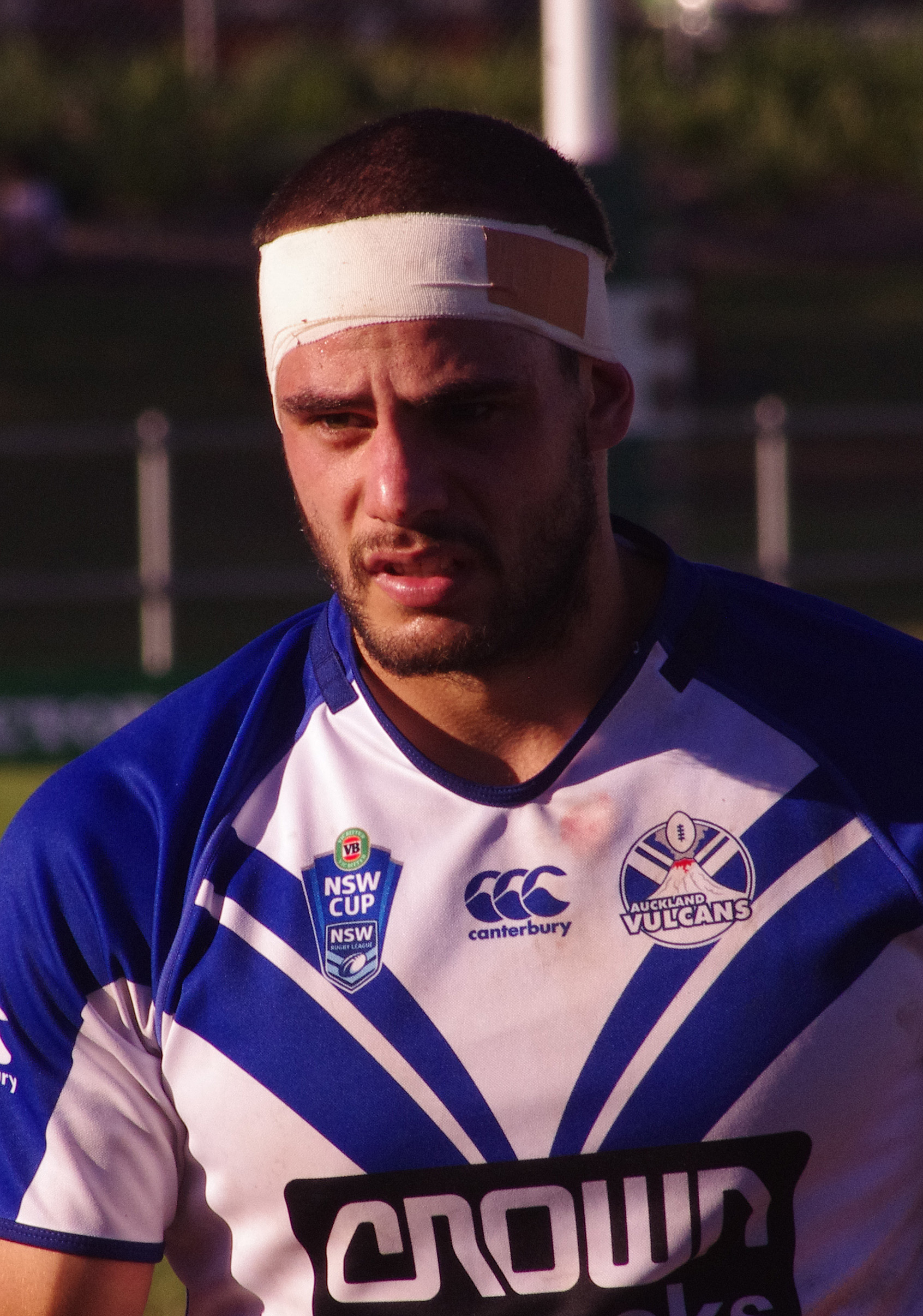

Personal information
- Born: 17 December 1988 (age 37) Hamilton, New Zealand
- Height: 183 cm (6 ft 0 in)
- Weight: 94 kg (14 st 11 lb)

Playing information
- Position: Second-row, Prop
Club
Years	Team	Pld	T	G	FG	P
2009–10	North Qld Cowboys	26	1	0	0	4
2011–13	New Zealand Warriors	14	0	0	0	0
2014	Salford Red Devils	20	0	0	0	0
	Total	60	1	0	0	4
- Source: As of 24 February 2018
- Relatives: Sam Rapira (brother)

Steve Rapira (born 17 December 1988) is a New Zealand former professional rugby league footballer. A second-row forward, he previously played in the National Rugby League for the North Queensland Cowboys and New Zealand Warriors, and English club Salford Red Devils of Super League, and is the younger brother of New Zealand international, Sam Rapira.

== Background ==
Rapira played for Hukanui in the Waikato Rugby League competition and the Waicoa Bay Stallions in the Bartercard Cup. Rapira played for the New Zealand Under-16's in 2004 and made the Junior Kiwis in 2005. He became a New Zealand Warriors junior and playing in their inaugural Toyota Cup team. He played for the Junior Warriors 10 times in 2008 and scored two tries.

== Professional playing career ==
=== National Rugby League ===
In 2009 Rapira joined North Queensland Cowboys, playing for the Mackay Cutters in the Queensland Cup. He made his first grade début on 11 April 2010 against the Gold Coast Titans. He was named the club's rookie of the year in 2009.

In 2010 Rapira signed a two-year contract to re-join the New Zealand Warriors for the 2011 and 2012 seasons, with an option on a third year.

He made his Warriors début in Round 13 on 4 June 2011. For the 2012 season Rapira has been "re-modelled" as a prop.

=== Super League ===
Rapira signed to play in the Super League for English club the Salford Red Devils in 2014.

=== Queensland Cup ===
In 2015, Rapira returned to the Mackay Cutters in the Queensland Cup.
