= Jesse Royal (rugby league) =

New Zealand rugby league footballer

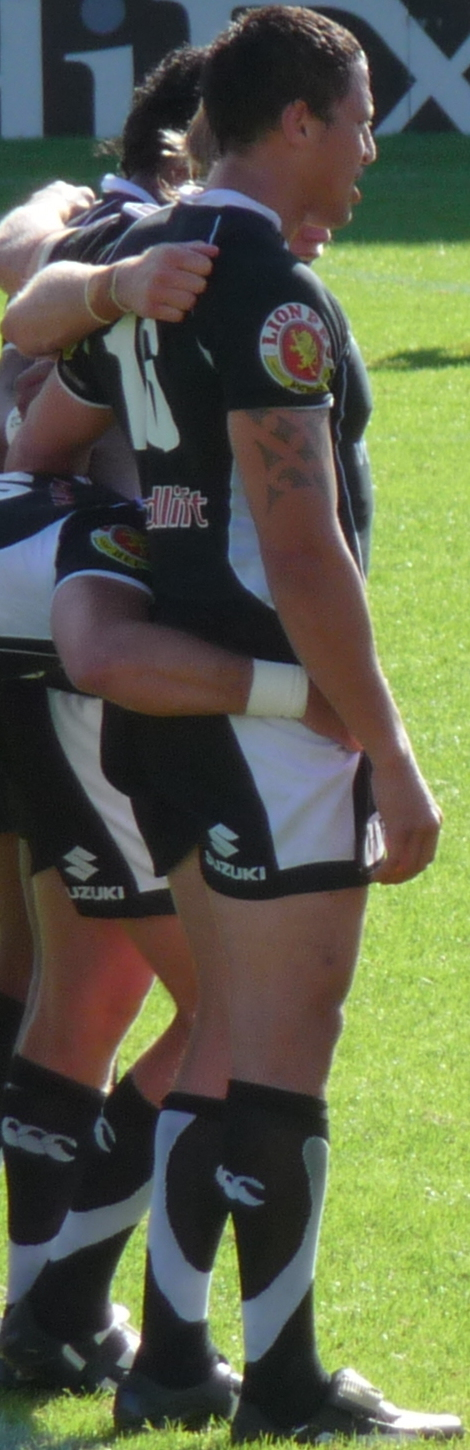

Personal information
- Full name: Jesse Te Ahukaramu Royal
- Born: 22 March 1980 (age 46) Hamilton, New Zealand

Playing information
- Height: 191 cm (6 ft 3 in)
- Weight: 107 kg (16 st 12 lb)
- Position: Prop
Club
Years	Team	Pld	T	G	FG	P
2007–08	Newcastle Knights	29	3	0	0	12
2009–10	New Zealand Warriors	36	2	0	0	8
	Total	65	5	0	0	20

Jesse Te Ahukaramu Royal (born 22 March 1980) is a professional rugby league footballer from New Zealand who currently plays for the Kurri Kurri Bulldogs in the Newcastle Rugby League. He has previously played in the NRL for the Newcastle Knights and New Zealand Warriors. Royal's preferred rugby league position is prop forward.

== Early years ==
Royal was born in Hamilton, New Zealand. He was a chef in the New Zealand Army and has played in the Bartercard Cup for the Central Falcons and represented Waikato. He captained the 2003 New Zealand A tour of England.

== Australia ==
Royal was signed by the Penrith Panthers which prompted a move to Australia in 2004 to play for the club's NSWRL Premier League team. In 2005 he joined the Newcastle Knights on a two-year deal, however he was not able to break out of Premier League. His form was good enough however to earn a new two-year deal which eventually led to his first grade debut in 2007. He went on to play 29 games for the Knights.

== Warriors ==
In 2009, Royal initially decided to explore employment opportunities in the coalmine industry, whilst also playing for the Kurri Kurri club, in order to spend more time with his young family. However he later signed a two-year deal with the New Zealand Warriors that same year to provide injury cover for Evarn Tuimavave. He made his Warriors debut in round 2 of the 2009 NRL season against the Manly Warringah Sea Eagles, scoring a try with his first touch of the ball.

== Later years ==
Royal decided to retire after the 2010 NRL season and return to Newcastle resume his employment in the mining industry, and to play for local club Kurri Kurri Bulldogs.
