= 2023 PNGNRL season =

Papua New Guinea rugby league season

2023 Papua New Guinea National Rugby League (Digicel Cup)
- Duration: April 16 – September 3, 2023
- Teams: 12
- Premiers: Enga Mioks (2nd title)
- Minor premiers: Enga Mioks
- Broadcast partners: Digicel (Subscription)

The 2023 season of Papua New Guinea National Rugby League competition will be the 33rd season of the premier rugby league competition in Papua New Guinea since 1991.

== Teams ==
The competition will still have 12 franchise teams competing in 2023 with the inclusion of successful bid team, Sepik Pride at the expense of Waghi Tumbe who were terminated for breaching the participation agreement in 2022.

== Regular season ==
=== Round 1 ===
Home	Score	Away	Match Information			
Home	Score	Away	Date and Time	Venue	Referee	Attendance
Port Moresby Vipers	30–10	Mt Hagen Eagles	16 April 2023, 13:00	Santos National Football Stadium		
Mendi Muruks	26–12	Kimbe Cutters	16 April 2023, 13:00	Lae Rugby League Ground, Lae		
Lae Snax Tigers	12–10	Central Dabaris	16 April 2022, 15:00	Lae Rugby League Ground, Lae		
Goroka Lahanis	30–30	Hela Wigmen	16 April 2023, 15:00	National Sports Institute, Goroka		
Enga Mioks	12–10	Rabaul Gurias	16 April 2023, 15:00	Aipus Oval, Wabag		
Gulf Isou	8–14	Sepik Pride	16 April 2023, 15:00	Santos National Football Stadium		

=== Round 2 ===
Home	Score	Away	Match Information			
Home	Score	Away	Date and Time	Venue	Referee	Attendance
Kimbe Cutters	14-20	Lae Snax Tigers	23 April 2023, 15:00	Kimbe		
Mendi Muruks	34-16	Mt Hagen Eagles	23 April 2023, 13:00	Lae		
Hela Wigmen	11-14	Enga Mioks	23 April 2023, 15:00	Santos National Football Stadium		
Sepik Pride	14–14	Goroka Lahanis	23 April 2023, 15:00	Wewak		
Rabaul Gurias	16-12	Port Moresby Vipers	22 April 2023, 14:00	Kalabond Oval		
Gulf Isou	14-16	Central Dabaris	23 April 2023, 15:00	Santos National Football Stadium		

=== Round 3 ===
Home	Score	Away	Match Information			
Home	Score	Away	Date and Time	Venue	Referee	Attendance
Lae Snax Tigers	32–2	Mt Hagen Eagles	30 April 2023, 13:00	Lae Rugby League Ground, Lae		
Goroka Lahanis	14-14	Gulf Isou	30 April 2023, 15:00	Goroka		
Enga Mioks	32-6	Sepik Pride	30 April 2023, 15:00	Aipus Oval, Wabag		
Central Dabaris	16-10	Kimbe Cutters	30 April 2023, 13:00	Santos National Football Stadium		
Port Moresby Vipers	18-14	Hela Wigmen	30 April 2023, 15:30	Santos National Football Stadium		
Mendi Muruks	18-2	Rabaul Gurias	1 May 2023, 15:00	Lae Rugby League Ground, Lae		

=== Round 4 ===
Home	Score	Away	Match Information			
Home	Score	Away	Date and Time	Venue	Referee	Attendance
Rabaul Gurias	30–12	Hela Wigmen	6 May 2023, 14:00	Kalabond Oval		
Mt Hagen Eagles	8–28	Enga Mioks	6 May 2023, 14:00	Jonah Amban Oval, Minj		
Goroka Lahanis	18–26	Lae Snax Tigers	7 May 2023, 14:00	Goroka		
Mendi Muruks	16-8	Kimbe Cutters	7 May 2023, 15:00	Lae		
Port Moresby Vipers	32-8	Gulf Isou	7 May 2023, 13:00	Santos National Football Stadium		
Central Dabaris	22-18	Sepik Pride	7 May 2023, 15:30	Santos National Football Stadium		

=== Round 5 ===
Home	Score	Away	Match Information			
Home	Score	Away	Date and Time	Venue	Referee	Attendance
Enga Mioks	30–18	Kimbe Cutters	14 May 2023, 15:00	Aipus Oval, Wabag		
Sepik Pride	14-16	Gulf Isou	14 May 2023, 13:00	Wewak		
Goroka Lahanis	32-10	Mt Hagen Eagles	14 May 2023, 15:30	NSI Goroka		
Mendi Muruks	10-12	Lae Snax Tigers	14 May 2023, 15:00	Lae		
Hela Wigmen	22-20	Port Moresby Vipers	14 May 2023, 13:00	Santos National Football Stadium		
CPG Central Dabaris	20-26	Rabaul Gurias	14 May 2023, 15:00	Santos National Football Stadium		

=== Round 6 ===
Home	Score	Away	Match Information			
Home	Score	Away	Date and Time	Venue	Referee	Attendance
Sepik Pride	14-16	Port Moresby Vipers	20 May 2023, 14:00	Wewak		
Kimbe Cutters	12-18	Lae Snax Tigers	20 May 2023, 14:00	Kimbe		
Mendi Muruks	17–18	Mt Hagen Eagles	21 May 2023, 15:00	Lae		
Goroka Lahanis	16-20	Enga Mioks	21 May 2023, 14:00	NSI, Goroka		
Hela Wigmen	24–20	Central Dabaris	21 May 2023, 13:00	Santos National Football Stadium		
Gulf Isou	10–28	Rabaul Gurias	21 May 2023, 15:30	Santos National Football Stadium		

=== Round 7 ===
Home	Score	Away	Match Information			
Home	Score	Away	Date and Time	Venue	Referee	Attendance
Rabaul Gurias	30-12	Sepik Pride	27 May 2023, 14:00	Kalabond Oval		
Enga Mioks	28-14	Mendi Muruks	28 May 2023, 13:00	Wabag		
Goroka Lahanis	22–6	Kimbe Cutters	28 May 2023, 13:00	Kimbe		
Lae Snax Tigers	38–16	Mt Hagen Eagles	28 May 2023, 14:00	Lae		
Hela Wigmen	26–10	Gulf Isou	28 May 2023, 15:30	Santos National Football Stadium		
Central Dabaris	42–26	Port Moresby Vipers	28 May 2023, 13:00	Santos National Football Stadium		

=== Round 8 ===
Home	Score	Away	Match Information			
Home	Score	Away	Date and Time	Venue	Referee	Attendance
Sepik Pride	14–22	Hela Wigmen	3 June 2023, 14:00	Wewak		
Kimbe Cutters	38-10	Mt Hagen Eagles	3 June 2023, 14:00	Kimbe		
Lae Snax Tigers	4–6	Enga Mioks	4 June 2023, 13:00	Lae		
Mendi Muruks	17–12	Goroka Lahanis	4 June 2023, 14:00	Lae		
Central Dabaris	20–10	Gulf Isou	4 June 2023, 13:00	Santos National Football Stadium		
Port Moresby Vipers	10-16	Rabaul Gurias	4 June 2023, 15:30	Santos National Football Stadium		

=== Round 9 ===
Home	Score	Away	Match Information			
Home	Score	Away	Date and Time	Venue	Referee	Attendance
Hela Wigmen	24–10	Rabaul Gurias	10 June 2023, 12:00	Santos National Football Stadium		
Sepik Pride	24–12	Central Dabaris	10 June 2023, 14:00	Wewak		
Lae Snax Tigers	38–10	Mt Hagen Eagles	11 June 2023, 13:00	Lae		
Goroka Lahanis	18-14	Kimbe Cutters	11 June 2023, 14:00	Goroka		
Port Moresby Vipers	12-18	Gulf Isou	11 June 2023, 14:30	Santos National Football Stadium		
Mendi Muruks	20-26	Enga Mioks	11 June 2023, 15:00	Lae		

=== Round 10 ===
Home	Score	Away	Match Information			
Home	Score	Away	Date and Time	Venue	Referee	Attendance
Rabaul Gurias	20-12	Central Dabaris	17 June 2023, 14:00	Kalabond Oval		
Gulf Isou	18-16	Sepik Pride	18 June 2023, 13:00	Santos National Football Stadium		
Goroka Lahanis	22-20	Mt Hagen Eagles	18 June 2023, 15:00	Goroka		
Mendi Muruks	14-14	Lae Snax Tigers	18 June 2023, 15:00	Lae		
Hela Wigmen	18-14	Port Moresby Vipers	18 June 2023, 15:00	Santos National Football Stadium		
Kimbe Cutters	8-16	Enga Mioks	17 June 2023, 14:00	Kimbe		

=== Round 11 ===
Home	Score	Away	Match Information			
Home	Score	Away	Date and Time	Venue	Referee	Attendance
Rabaul Gurias	34–6	Gulf Isou	24 June 2023, 14:00	Kalabond Oval, Kokopo		
Kimbe Cutters	26–6	Mt Hagen Eagles	25 June 2023, 14:00	Humphreys Oval, Kimbe		
Goroka Lahanis	16–14	Mendi Muruks	25 June 2023, 13:00	NSI Goroka		
Hela Wigmen	16–16	Central Dabaris	25 June 2023, 13:00	Santos National Football Stadium		
Enga Mioks	18–12	Lae Snax Tigers	25 June 2023, 15:00	Aipus Oval, Wabag		
Port Moresby Vipers	14-18	Sepik Pride	25 June 2023, 15:30	Santos National Football Stadium		

=== Round 12 ===
Home	Score	Away	Match Information			
Home	Score	Away	Date and Time	Venue	Referee	Attendance
Sepik Pride	36–26	Rabaul Gurias	1 July 2023, 14:00	Wewak		
Enga Mioks	22–10	Goroka Lahanis	2 July 2023, 14:00	Wabag		
Mendi Muruks	32–4	Mt Hagen Eagles	2 July 2023, 14:00	Lae		
Lae Snax Tigers	30-18	Kimbe Cutters	2 July 2023, 11:00	Lae		
Central Dabaris	10-24	Port Moresby Vipers	2 July 2023, 13:00	Santos National Football Stadium		
Gulf Isou	8–22	Hela Wigmen	2 July 2023, 15:30	Santos National Football Stadium		

=== Round 13 ===
Home	Score	Away	Match Information			
Home	Score	Away	Date and Time	Venue	Referee	Attendance
Rabaul Gurias	18–14	Port Moresby Vipers	8 July 2023, 14:00	Kalabond Oval		
Enga Mioks	34–18	Mt Hagen Eagles	9 July 2023, 12:30	Wabag		
Lae Snax Tigers	24–26	Goroka Lahanis	9 July 2023, 15:00	Lae League Ground, Lae		
Kimbe Cutters	22–19	Mendi Muruks	9 July 2023, 15:00	Kimbe		
Hela Wigmen	18–6	Sepik Pride	9 July 2023, 13:00	PNG Football Stadium		
Central Dabaris	8–10	Gulf Isou	9 July 2023, 15:30	Santos National Football Stadium		

=== Round 14 ===
Home	Score	Away	Match Information			
Home	Score	Away	Date and Time	Venue	Referee	Attendance
Central Dabaris	24–0	Mt Hagen Eagles	22 July 2023, 12:30	Santos National Football Stadium		
Rabaul Gurias	12–22	Mendi Muruks	22 July 2023, 15:00	Santos National Football Stadium		
Goroka Lahanis	12–14	Gulf Isou	23 July 2023, 12:30	Lae Rugby League Oval		
Hela Wigmen	26–20	Kimbe Cutters	23 July 2023, 12:30	Santos National Football Stadium		
Lae Snax Tigers	32–8	Sepik Pride	23 July 2023, 15:00	Lae Rugby League Grounds		
Port Moresby Vipers	22–22	Enga Mioks	23 July 2023, 15:00	Santos National Football Stadium		

=== Round 15 ===
Home	Score	Away	Match Information			
Home	Score	Away	Date and Time	Venue	Referee	Attendance
Rabaul Gurias	44–16	Kimbe Cutters	29 July 2023, 12:30	PNG Football Stadium		
Enga Mioks	22–6	Sepik Pride	29 July 2023, 15:00	PNG Football Stadium		
Hela Wigmen	24–18	Mt Hagen Eagles	30 July 2023, 12:30	Lae Rugby League Ground, Lae		
Lae Snax Tigers	28–12	Gulf Isou	30 July 2023, 12:30	Santos National Football Stadium		
Mendi Muruks	22–20	Central Dabaris	30 July 2023, 15:00	Lae Rugby League Ground, Lae		
Port Moresby Vipers	18–14	Goroka Lahanis	30 July 2023, 15:00	Santos National Football Stadium		

=== Round 16 ===
Home	Score	Away	Match Information			
Home	Score	Away	Date and Time	Venue	Referee	Attendance
Central Dabaris	36–14	Kimbe Cutters	5 August 2023, 12:30	Santos National Football Stadium		
Rabaul Gurias	40–30	Mt Hagen Eagles	6 August 2023, 11:00	Santos National Football Stadium		
Lae Snax Tigers	20–10	Port Moresby Vipers	6 August 2023, 12:30	Lae		
Goroka Lahanis	26–16	Sepik Pride	6 August 2023, 13:20	Santos National Football Stadium		
Enga Mioks	18–14	Gulf Isou	6 August 2023, 15:00	Lae		
Hela Wigmen	16–10	Mendi Muruks	6 August 2023, 15:00	Santos National Football Stadium		

== Ladder ==
Pos	Team	Pld	W	D	L	B	PF	PA	PD	Pts
1	Enga Mioks	16	15	1	0	0	348	197	151	31
2	Lae Snax Tigers	16	12	1	3	0	358	204	154	25
3	Kroton Hela Wigmen	16	11	2	3	0	325	258	67	24
4	Rabaul Gurias	16	11	0	5	0	362	266	96	22
5	Mendi Muruks	16	8	1	7	0	305	238	67	17
6	Goroka Lahanis	16	7	3	6	0	302	279	23	17
7	Gas Resource Central Dabaris	16	7	1	8	0	304	270	34	15
8	Port Moresby Vipers	16	6	1	9	0	294	280	14	13
9	Gulf Isou	16	5	1	10	0	190	314	-124	11
10	Sepik Pride	16	4	1	11	0	236	330	-94	9
11	Kimbe Cutters	16	3	0	13	0	256	353	-97	6
12	Mt Hagen Eagles	16	1	0	15	0	196	487	-291	2

- The team highlighted in blue has clinched the minor premiership
- Teams highlighted in green have qualified for the finals
- The team highlighted in red has clinched the wooden spoon

== Pools Format ==
All 12 teams have been split into two pools for the remainder of the season due to flight cancellations affecting teams travels from Round 4.

=== Pool A Ladder ===
Pos	Team	Pld	W	D	L	B	PF	PA	PD	Pts
1	Enga Mioks	13	13	0	0	0	286	155	131	24
2	Lae Snax Tigers	13	9	1	3	0	278	174	104	19
3	Goroka Lahanis	13	6	3	4	0	250	231	19	15
4	Mendi Muruks	13	6	1	6	0	251	190	61	13
5	Kimbe Cutters	13	3	0	10	0	206	247	-41	6
6	Mt Hagen Eagles	13	1	0	12	0	148	399	-251	2

=== Pool B Ladder ===
Pos	Team	Pld	W	D	L	B	PF	PA	PD	Pts
1	Rabaul Gurias	13	9	0	4	0	266	198	68	18
2	Hela Wigmen	13	8	2	3	0	259	210	49	18
3	Gas Resource Central Dabaris	13	5	1	7	0	224	234	-10	11
4	Port Moresby Vipers	13	5	0	8	0	244	224	20	10
5	Sepik Pride	13	4	1	7	0	206	250	-44	9
6	Gulf Isou	13	4	1	8	0	150	256	-106	9

== Finals series ==
Home	Score	Away	Match Information
Home	Score	Away	Date and Time (Local)	Venue
Elimination Finals
Hela Wigmen	8– 14	Goroka Lahanis	13 August 2023, 12:30pm	National Football Stadium
Rabaul Gurias	28-26	Mendi Muruks	13 August 2023, 3:00pm	National Football Stadium
Major / Minor Semi-finals
Enga Mioks	6 - 4	Lae Snax Tigers	20 August 2023, 12:30pm	National Football Stadium
Rabaul Gurias	18 - 24	Goroka Lahanis	20 August 2023, 3:00pm	National Football Stadium
Preliminary Final
Lae Snax Tigers	18-19	Goroka Lahanis	27 August 2023, 3:00pm	National Football Stadium
Grand Final
Enga Mioks	26-6	Goroka Lahanis	3 September 2023, 3:00pm	National Football Stadium

Qualifying / Elimination Finals
3	Hela Wigmen	8
6	Goroka Lahanis	14
4	Rabaul Gurias	28
5	Mendi Muruks	26

Major / Minor Semi-finals
1	Enga Mioks	6
2	Lae Snax Tigers	4
4	Rabaul Gurias	18
6	Goroka Lahanis	24

Preliminary Final
2	Lae Snax Tigers	18
6	Goroka Lahanis	19

Grand Final
1	Enga Mioks	26
6	Goroka Lahanis	6
