= 2019 PNGNRL season =

Papua New Guinea rugby league season

2019 Papua New Guinea National Rugby League (Digicel Cup)
- Teams: 12
- Premiers: Lae Snax Tigers
- Broadcast partners: Digicel (Subscription)

The 2019 PNGNRL Digicel Cup season was the 29th season of professional rugby league in Papua New Guinea. The Lae Snax Tigers won the minor premiership and the Grand Final, defeating the Hela Wigmen 15–4.

== 2019 season ==
The season commenced in April and ended in September. Three new teams entered the league: the Mt Hagen Eagles, the Vitis Central Dabaris and the Kimbe Cutters. The Chimbu Warriors were expelled before the start of the season, having failed to improve their home ground to the satisfaction of the PNGNRL.

== Teams ==
Locations of the 2019 Digicel Cup teams

2019 Digicel Cup Teams
Team	Stadium	City/Area
Agmark Gurias	Kalabond Oval	Kokopo, East New Britain Province
Enga Mioks	Johnson Siki Aipus Oval	Wabag, Enga Province
Goroka Lahanis	National Sports Institute	Goroka, Eastern Highlands Province
Gulf Isou	PNG Football Stadium	Port Moresby, National Capital District
Hela Wigmen	Lae League Oval	Tari Hela Province
Kimbe Cutters	Sasi Muthuvel Stadium	Kimbe, West New Britain Province
Lae Snax Tigers	Lae League Oval	Lae, Morobe Province
Mendi Muruks	Joseph Keviame Oval	Mendi, Southern Highlands Province
Mt. Hagen Eagles	Rebiamul Oval	Mt.Hagen, Western Highlands Province
Port Moresby Vipers	Lloyd Robson Oval	Port Moresby
Vitis Central Dabaris	Oil Search National Football Stadium	Port Moresby, National Capital District
Waghi Tumbe	Minj Oval	Minj, Jiwaka Province

== Ladder ==
Pos	Team	Pld	W	D	L	PF	PA	Pts
1	Lae Snax Tigers	18	14	2	2	462	202	20
2	Waghi Tumbe	18	13	2	3	364	281	20
3	Rabaul Gurias	18	13	0	5	380	188	16
4	Goroka Lahanis	18	10	4	4	408	276	15
5	Mt Hagen Eagles	18	8	2	8	248	375	12
6	Hela Wigmen	18	8	1	9	297	252	11
7	Enga Mioks	18	6	4	8	274	257	11
8	Port Moresby Vipers	18	7	1	10	257	332	7
9	Gulf Isou	18	7	1	10	169	382	6
10	Mendi Muruks	18	5	1	12	193	246	1
11	Vitis Central Dabaris	18	5	1	12	302	440	6
12	Kimbe Cutters	18	2	1	15	217	440	1

== Sources ==
http://websites.sportstg.com/comp_info.cgi?a=ROUND&round=3&client=0-11722-0-526935-0&pool=1
