= 2020 PNGNRL season =

Papua New Guinea rugby league season

2020 Papua New Guinea National Rugby League (Digicel Cup)
- Duration: 4 July – 18 October 2020
- Teams: 12
- Minor premiers: Rabaul Gurias
- Wooden spoon: Gulf Isou
- Matches played: 66 + 6
- Broadcast partners: Digicel (Subscription)
- Top points scorer: C Simon (68)
- Premiers: Hela Wigmen
- Runners-up: Lae Snax Tigers
- Top try-scorer: S Wane (12)

The 2020 PNGNRL Digicel Cup season will be the 30th season of professional rugby league in Papua New Guinea.

== 2020 season ==
The season commenced on 5 July and ended on 18 October. In the Grand Final, Hela Wigmen defeated Lae Snax Tigers 16–14.

== Teams ==
Locations of the 2020 Digicel Cup teams

2020 Digicel Cup Teams
Team	Stadium	City/Area
Agmark Gurias	Kalabond Oval	Kokopo, East New Britain Province
Enga Mioks	Johnson Siki Aipus Oval	Wabag, Enga Province
Goroka Lahanis	National Sports Institute	Goroka, Eastern Highlands Province
Gulf Isou	PNG Football Stadium	Port Moresby, National Capital District
Hela Wigmen	Lae League Oval	Tari Hela Province
Kimbe Cutters	Sasi Muthuvel Stadium	Kimbe, West New Britain Province
Lae Snax Tigers	Lae League Oval	Lae, Morobe Province
Mendi Muruks	Joseph Keviame Oval	Mendi, Southern Highlands Province
Mt. Hagen Eagles	Rebiamul Oval	Mt.Hagen, Western Highlands Province
Port Moresby Vipers	Lloyd Robson Oval	Port Moresby
Vitis Central Dabaris	Oil Search National Football Stadium	Port Moresby, National Capital District
Waghi Tumbe	Minj Oval	Minj, Jiwaka Province

== Regular season ==
=== Round 1 ===
4 and 5 July 2020

Home	Score	Away	Venue
Rabaul Gurias	30 – 10	Mt Hagen Eagles	Port Moresby
Central Dabaris	18 – 6	Gulf Isou	Port Moresby
Waghi Tumbe	8 – 28	Lae Snax Tigers	Lae
Hela Wigmen	12 – 4	Kimbe Cutters	Port Moresby
Mendi Muruks	22 – 10	Goroka Lahanis	Lae
Port Moresby Vipers	10 – 10	Enga Mioks	Port Moresby

=== Round 2 ===
11 and 12 July 2020

Home	Score	Away	Venue
Goroka Lahanis	10 – 12	Port Moresby Vipers	Port Moresby
Kimbe Cutters	14 – 4	Waghi Tumbe	Port Moresby
Mt Hagen Eagles	18 – 22	Mendi Muruks	Lae
Enga Mioks	18 – 19	Hela Wigmen	Lae
Lae Snax Tigers	40 – 10	Central Dabaris	Port Moresby
Gulf Isou	2 – 38	Rabaul Gurias	Port Moresby

=== Round 3 ===
18 and 19 July 2020

Home	Score	Away	Venue
Mt Hagen Eagles	10 – 16	Gulf Isou	Port Moresby
Port Moresby Vipers	6 – 12	Mendi Muruks	Port Moresby
Waghi Tumbe	12 – 12	Enga Mioks	Lae
Rabaul Gurias	16 – 24	Lae Snax Tigers	Lae
Central Dabaris	16 – 16	Kimbe Cutters	Port Moresby
Hela Wigmen	18 – 8	Goroka Lahanis	Port Moresby

=== Round 4 ===
25 and 26 July 2020

Home	Score	Away	Venue
Kimbe Cutters	14 – 36	Rabaul Gurias	Port Moresby
Lae Snax Tigers	40 – 4	Gulf Isou	Port Moresby
Mendi Muruks	12 – 14	Hela Wigmen	Lae
Enga Mioks	6 – 6	Central Dabaris	Port Moresby
Goroka Lahanis	18 – 40	Waghi Tumbe	Lae
Port Moresby Vipers	16 – 10	Mt Hagen Eagles	Port Moresby

=== Round 5 ===
2 and 9 August 2020

Home	Score	Away	Venue
Waghi Tumbe	16 – 18	Mendi Muruks	Lae
Mt Hagen Eagles	24 – 34	Lae Snax Tigers	Lae
Central Dabaris	32 – 34	Goroka Lahanis	Lae
Gulf Isou	8 – 26	Kimbe Cutters	Port Moresby
Rabaul Gurias	22 – 12	Enga Mioks	Lae
Hela Wigmen	12 – 26	Port Moresby Vipers	Port Moresby

=== Round 6 ===
15 and 16 August 2020

Home	Score	Away	Venue
Goroka Lahanis	14 – 14	Rabaul Gurias	Lae
Port Moresby Vipers	18 – 8	Waghi Tumbe	Port Moresby
Enga Mioks	24 – 14	Gulf Isou	Lae
Mendi Muruks	16 – 14	Central Dabaris	Port Moresby
Kimbe Cutters	14 – 26	Lae Snax Tigers	Lae
Hela Wigmen	20 – 6	Mt Hagen Eagles	Port Moresby

=== Round 7 ===
22 and 23 August 2020

Home	Score	Away	Venue
Rabaul Gurias	48 – 2	Mendi Muruks	Kokopo
Gulf Isou	16 – 28	Goroka Lahanis	Port Moresby
Mt Hagen Eagles	18 – 18	Kimbe Cutters	Lae
Central Dabaris	10 – 17	Port Moresby Vipers	Port Moresby
Lae Snax Tigers	38 – 0	Enga Mioks	Lae
Waghi Tumbe	6 – 14	Hela Wigmen	Port Moresby

=== Round 8 ===
29 and 30 August 2020

Home	Score	Away	Venue
Waghi Tumbe	16 – 10	Mt Hagen Eagles	Minj
Mendi Muruks	40 – 4	Gulf Isou	Lae
Hela Wigmen	24 – 14	Central Dabaris	Port Moresby
Goroka Lahanis	12 – 40	Lae Snax Tigers	Goroka
Enga Mioks	18 – 10	Kimbe Cutters	Lae
Port Moresby Vipers	10 – 14	Rabaul Gurias	Port Moresby

=== Round 9 ===
5 and 6 September 2020

Home	Score	Away	Venue
Rabaul Gurias	36 – 8	Hela Wigmen	Kokopo
Kimbe Cutters	28 – 20	Goroka Lahanis	Lae
Mt Hagen Eagles	20 – 10	Enga Mioks	Lae
Gulf Isou	22 – 30	Port Moresby Vipers	Port Moresby
Lae Snax Tigers	22 – 12	Mendi Muruks	Lae
Central Dabaris	14 – 14	Waghi Tumbe	Port Moresby

=== Round 10 ===
12 and 13 September 2020

Home	Score	Away	Venue
Kimbe Cutters	16 – 32	Port Moresby Vipers	Kimbe
Rabaul Gurias	38 – 20	Central Dabaris	Kokopo
Mt Hagen Eagles	36 – 20	Goroka Lahanis	Minj
Gulf Isou	16 – 32	Waghi Tumbe	Port Moresby
Enga Mioks	6 – 22	Mendi Muruks	Lae
Lae Snax Tigers	4 – 24	Hela Wigmen	Port Moresby

=== Round 11 ===
19 and 20 September 2020

Home	Score	Away	Venue
Central Dabaris	18 – 34	Mt Hagen Eagles	Minj
Hela Wigmen	28 – 20	Gulf Isou	Port Moresby
Mendi Muruks	22 – 10	Kimbe Cutters	Lae
Waghi Tumbe	14 – 20	Rabaul Gurias	Port Moresby
Goroka Lahanis	12 – 14	Enga Mioks	Lae
Port Moresby Vipers	7 – 0	Lae Snax Tigers	Port Moresby

== Finals series ==
A top-six finals series was played over four weeks, all matches at Port Moresby.

Date	Home	Score	Away
27 September	Hela Wigmen	14 – 12	Enga Mioks
27 September	Port Moresby Vipers	12 – 10	Mendi Muruks
4 October	Rabaul Gurias	10 – 30	Lae Snax Tigers
4 October	Port Moresby Vipers	8 – 12	Hela Wigmen
11 October	Rabaul Gurias	10 – 11	Hela Wigmen
18 October	Lae Snax Tigers	14 – 16	Hela Wigmen

=== Grand final ===
The Hela Wigmen defeated the Lae Snax Tigers 16-14 at Port Moresby on 18 October 2020 to win their second premiership. The Wigmen qualified third and won four consecutive matches to take the title, three of them by two points or fewer.

== Ladder ==
Pos	Team	Pld	W	D	L	PF	PA	%	Pts
1	Rabaul Gurias	11	9	1	1	312	130	240.00	19
2	Lae Snax Tigers	11	9	0	2	296	131	225.95	18
3	Hela Wigmen	11	9	0	2	193	154	125.32	18
4	Port Moresby Vipers	11	8	1	2	184	124	148.39	17
5	Mendi Muruks	11	8	0	3	200	168	119.05	16
6	Enga Mioks	11	3	3	5	130	185	70.27	9
7	Waghi Tumbe	11	3	2	6	170	182	93.41	8
8	Kimbe Cutters	11	3	2	6	170	212	80.19	8
9	Mt Hagen Eagles	11	3	1	7	196	220	89.09	7
10	Central Dabaris	11	1	3	7	172	245	70.20	5
11	Goroka Lahanis	11	2	1	8	186	272	68.38	5
12	Gulf Isou	11	1	0	10	128	314	40.76	2

- Clubs shaded green qualified for the finals series.

== Statistics ==
=== Top try scorers ===
Pos	Player	Club	Tries
1	S Wane	Hela Wigmen	12
2	J Bire	Lae Snax Tigers	11
3	T Wepi	Rabaul Gurias	10
4	E Ipape	Lae Snax Tigers	8
5	G Paul	Hela Wigmen	8

=== Top goal kickers ===
Pos	Player	Club	Goals
1	C Simon	Lae Snax Tigers	30
2	S Pokare	Hela Wigmen	25
3	W Boas	Rabaul Gurias	22
4	A Boas	Port Moresby Vipers	19
5	B Noel	Mt Hagen Eagles	18

=== Top point scorers ===
Pos	Player	Club	Points
1	C Simon	Lae Snax Tigers	68
2	S Pokare	Hela Wigmen	59
3	W Boas	Rabaul Gurias	52
4	A Boas	Port Moresby Vipers	51
5	S Wane	Hela Wigmen	48

== Sources ==
- http://websites.sportstg.com/comp_info.cgi?a=ROUND&round=3&client=0-11722-0-526935-0
