= 2024 PNGNRL season =

Papua New Guinea rugby league season

2024 Papua New Guinea National Rugby League (Digicel Cup)
- Duration: April 16 – September 3, 2024
- Teams: 13
- Broadcast partners: Digicel (Subscription)

The 2024 season of Papua New Guinea National Rugby League competition will be the 34th season of the premier rugby league competition in Papua New Guinea since 1991.

== Teams ==
The competition will have 12 franchise teams competing in 2024 with the re-inclusion of Waghi Tumbe who were terminated for breaching the participation agreement in 2022. Sepik Pride, who replaced them, were removed this year for failing to meet standards for inclusion.

== Events ==
Before the season started the Rabaul Gurias decided to relocate for the season due to complications with their region's airport. Transport problems continued during the season, during the round 5 game between Kimbe and Vipers the game was postponed and played during the week behind closed doors.

During round 4 game between Eagles and Central, Eagles captain Levai Andrew refused to leave the pitch for a sin-bining and the referee let him stay. The referee was banned from the next round and the captain for at least 10 weeks.

== Regular season ==
=== Round 1 ===
Home	Score	Away	Match Information
Home	Score	Away	Date and Time	Venue
Gulf Isou	14-20	Mt. Hagen Eagles	13 April 2024, 11:00	National Football Stadium
Enga Mioks	28-38	Rabaul Gurias	13 April 2024, 13:00	National Football Stadium
Port Moresby Vipers	22-16	Goroka Lahanis	13 April 2024, 15:00	National Football Stadium
Waghi Tumbe	18-14	Central Dabaris	13 April 2024, 14:00	John Amban Oval, Minj
Mendi Muruks	26-16	Hela Wigmen	14 April 2024, 15:00	Lae Rugby League Oval
Kimbe Cutters	24-22	Lae Snax Tigers	14 April 2024, 14:00	Peter Humphreys Oval, Kimbe

=== Round 2 ===
Home	Score	Away	Match Information
Home	Score	Away	Date and Time	Venue
Rabaul Gurias	12-12	Central Dabaris	20 April 2024, 12:45	National Football Stadium
Lae Snax Tigers	21-14	Gulf Isou	21 April 2024, 13:00	Lae Rugby League Oval
Port Moresby Vipers	2012	Waghi Tumbe	21 April 2024, 13:00	National Football Stadium
Mendi Muruks	28-20	Goroka Lahanis	21 April 2024, 13:00	Lae Rugby League Oval
Mt. Hagen Eagles	16-16	Enga Mioks	22 April 2024, 13:00	John Amban Oval, Minj
Hela Wigmen	30-22	Kimbe Cutters	21 April 2024, 13:00	National Football Stadium

=== Round 3 ===
Home	Score	Away	Match Information
Home	Score	Away	Date and Time	Venue
Waghi Tumbe	18-20	Mendi Muruks	27 April 2024, 14:00	John Amban Oval, Minj
Rabaul Gurias	14-22	Mt. Hagen Eagles	28 April 2024, 14:00	National Football Stadium
Central Dabaris	22-18	Port Moresby Vipers	28 April 2024, 16:00	National Football Stadium
Gulf Isou	8-18	Hela Wigmen	28 April 2024, 12:00	National Football Stadium
Lae Snax Tigers	24-22	Enga Mioks	28 April 2024, 14:00	Alpus Oval, Wabag
Goroka Lahanis	14-18	Kimbe Cutters	28 April 2024, 14:00	National Sports Institute

=== Round 4 ===
Home	Score	Away	Match Information
Home	Score	Away	Date and Time	Venue
Mt. Hagen Eagles	18-18	Central Dabaris	4 May 2024, 14:00	John Amban Oval, Minj
Kimbe Cutters	18-8	Waghi Tumbe	5 May 2024, 12:00	National Football Stadium
Mendi Muruks	24-18	Port Moresby Vipers	6 May 2024, 14:00	Lae Rugby league Oval
Hela Wigmen	16-16	Enga Mioks	6 May 2024, 14:00	National Football Stadium
Lae Snax Tigers	12-16	Rabaul Gurias	6 May 2024, 15:00	Lae Rugby league Oval
Gulf Isou	8-14	Goroka Lahanis	6 May 2024, 16:00	National Football Stadium

=== Round 5 ===
Home	Score	Away	Match Information
Home	Score	Away	Date and Time	Venue
Waghi Tumbe	32-8	Gulf Isou	11 May 2024, 15:00	John Amban Oval, Minj
Kimbe Cutters	6-28	Port Moresby Vipers	14 May 2024, 14:00	National Football Stadium
Central Dabaris	18-26	Mendi Muruks	12 May 2024, 13:00	National Football Stadium
Enga Mioks	28-4	Goroka Lahanis	12 May 2024, 14:00	Aipus Oval, Wabag
Rabaul Gurias	19-12	Hela Wigmen	12 May 2024, 15:00	National Football Stadium
Lae Snax Tigers	38-16	Mt. Hagen Eagles	12 May 2024, 15:00	Lae Rugby League Oval

=== Round 6 ===
Home	Score	Away	Match Information
Home	Score	Away	Date and Time	Venue
Waghi Tumbe	20-10	Mt. Hagen Eagles	18 May 2024, 14:00	John Amban Oval
Rabaul Gurias	14-26	Port Moresby Vipers	19 May 2024, 12:00	National Football Stadium
Hela Wigmen	24-24	Central Dabaris	19 May 2024, 14:00	National Football Stadium
Goroka Lahanis	22-18	Lae Snax Tigers	19 May 2024, 14:00	National Sports Institute
Mendi Muruks	14-22	Enga Mioks	19 May 2024, 13:00	Lae Rugby League Oval
Gulf Isou	18-24	Kimbe Cutters	19 May 2024, 16:00	National Football Stadium

=== Round 7 ===
Home	Score	Away	Match Information
Home	Score	Away	Date and Time	Venue
Kimbe Cutters	6-12	Mt. Hagen Eagles	26 May 2024, 12:00	National Football Stadium
Enga Mioks	24-18	Central Dabaris	26 May 2024, 14:00	Aipus Oval, Wabag
Rabaul Gurias	38-0	Gulf Isou	26 May 2024, 14:00	National Football Stadium
Goroka Lahanis	6-10	Waghi Tumbe	26 May 2024, 14:00	National Sports Institute
Lae Snax Tigers	34-14	Mendi Muruks	26 May 2024, 15:00	Lae Rugby League Oval
Hela Wigmen	12-6	Port Moresby Vipers	26 May 2024, 16:00	National Football Stadium

=== Round 8 ===
Home	Score	Away	Match Information
Home	Score	Away	Date and Time	Venue
Gulf Isou	18-22	Port Moresby Vipers	1 June 2024, 12:45	National Football Stadium
Kimbe Cutters	18-30	Mendi Muruks	2 June 2024, 13:00	National Football Stadium
Hela Wigmen	14-16	Mt. Hagen Eagles	2 June 2023, 15:10	National Football Stadium
Goroka Lahanis	36-18	Rabaul Gurias	2 June 2024, 14:00	National Sports Institute
Enga Mioks	32-22	Waghi Tumbe	2 June 2024, 14:00	Aipus Oval
Lae Snax Tigers	16-16	Central Dabaris	2 June 2024, 15:30	Lae Rugby League Oval

=== Round 9 ===
Home	Score	Away	Match Information
Home	Score	Away	Date and Time	Venue
Central Dabaris	28-18	Gulf Isou	8 June 2024, 14:00	National Football Stadium
Kimbe Cutters	8-14	Enga Mioks	8 June 2024, 14:00	Peter Humphreys Oval
Mt. Hagen Eagles	26-16	Port Moresby Vipers	8 June 2024, 14:00	Jonah Amban Oval
Lae Snax Tigers	20-14	Waghi Tumbe	9 June 2024, 12:45	Lae Rugby League Oval
Mendi Muruks	16-18	Rabaul Gurias	9 June 2024, 15:00	Lae Rugby League Oval
Goroka Lahanis	22-14	Hela Wigmen	9 June 2024, 14:00	National Sports Institute

=== Round 10 ===
Home	Score	Away	Match Information
Home	Score	Away	Date and Time	Venue
Waghi Tumbe	10-8	Hela Wigmen	15 June 2024, 14:00	Jonah Amban Oval
Kimbe Cutters	14-36	Rabaul Gurias	16 June 2024, 14:00	Peter Humphreys Oval
Mt. Hagen Eagles	31-24	Mendi Muruks	16 June 2024, 14:00	Jonah Amban Oval
Central Dabaris	40-18	Goroka Lahanis	16 June 2024, 13:00	National Football Stadium
Port Moresby Vipers	18-34	Lae Snax Tigers	16 June 2024, 15:00	National Football Stadium
Enga Mioks	62-10	Gulf Isou	16 June 2024, 14:00	Aipus Oval

=== Round 11 ===
Home	Score	Away	Match Information
Home	Score	Away	Date and Time	Venue
Mt. Hagen Eagles	28-16	Goroka Lahanis	22 June 2024, 14:00	Jonah Amban Oval
Kimbe Cutters	12-20	Central Dabaris	22 June 2024, 14:00	Humphreys Oval, Kimbe
Rabaul Gurias	20-14	Waghi Tumbe	23 June 2024, 13:00	National Football Stadium
Port Moresby Vipers	18-18	Enga Mioks	23 June 2024, 15:00	National Football Stadium
Mendi Muruks	34-12	Gulf Isou	23 June 2024, 12:45	Lae Rugby League Oval
Lae Snax Tigers	10-16	Hela Wigmen	23 June 2024, 15:00	Lae Rugby League Oval

=== Round 12 ===
Home	Score	Away	Match Information
Home	Score	Away	Date and Time	Venue
Mt. Hagen Eagles	22-18	Gulf Isou	29 June 2024, 14:00	Jonah Amban Oval
Enga Mioks	28-10	Rabaul Gurias	30 June 2024, 14:00	Aipus Oval
Goroka Lahanis	38-22	Port Moresby Vipers	30 June 2024, 14:00	NSI Gorokha
Lae Snax Tigers	20-20	Kimbe Cutters	30 June 2024, 15:00	Lae Rugby League Oval
Central Dabaris	10-4	Waghi Tumbe	30 June 2024, 13:00	National Football Stadium
Hela Wigmen	16-16	Mendi Muruks	30 June 2024, 15:00	National Football Stadium

=== Round 13 ===
Home	Score	Away	Match Information
Home	Score	Away	Date and Time	Venue
Waghi Tumbe	24-16	Port Moresby Vipers	6 July 2024, 14:00	Jonah Ambam Oval
Kimbe Cutters	10-12	Hela Wigmen	6 July 2024, 14:00	Peter Humphreys Oval
Enga Mioks	24-16	Mt. Hagen Eagles	7 July 2024, 14:00	Aipus Oval
Goroka Lahanis	20-20	Mendi Muruks	7 July 2024, 14:00	National Sports Institute
Gulf Isou	10-24	Lae Snax Tigers	7 July 2024, 13:00	National Football Stadium
Central Dabaris	6-22	Rabaul Gurias	7 July 2024, 15:00	National Football Stadium

== Ladder ==
After 18 rounds

Pos	Team	Pld	W	D	L	PF	PA	PD	Pts
1	Mt Hagen Eagles	18	12	2	4			118	26
2	Enga Mioks	18	11	3	4			15	25
3	Rabaul Gurias	18	11	2	5			49	24
4	Lae Snax Tigers	18	10	3	5			71	23
5	Mendi Muruks	18	9	3	6			31	21
6	Kroton Hela Wigmen	18	8	3	7			18	19
7	Central Dabaris	18	7	5	6			3	19
8	Waghi Tumbe	18	9	0	9			4	18
9	Goroka Lahanis	18	7	1	10			-14	15
10	Kimbe Cutters	18	7	1	10			-28	15
11	Port Moresby Vipers	18	5	1	12			-64	11
12	Gulf Isou	18	0	0	18			-203	0

- The team highlighted in blue has clinched the minor premiership
- Teams highlighted in green have qualified for the finals
- The team highlighted in red has clinched the wooden spoon

== Finals series ==
Home	Score	Away	Match Information
Home	Score	Away	Date and Time (Local)	Venue
Elimination Finals
Rabaul Gurias	14–22	Hela Wigmen	25 August 2024, 1:00pm	National Football Stadium
Lae Snax Tigers	10–8	Mendi Muruks	25 August 2024, 3:15pm	National Football Stadium
Major / Minor Semi-finals
Mt Hagen Eagles	16–12	Enga Mioks	1 September 2024, 1:00pm	National Football Stadium
Lae Snax Tigers	12–32	Hela Wigmen	1 September 2024, 3:15pm	National Football Stadium
Preliminary Final
Enga Mioks	12–20	Hela Wigmen	8 September 2024, 3:15pm	National Football Stadium
Grand Final
Mt Hagen Eagles	28–20	Hela Wigmen	15 September 2024, 3:00pm	National Football Stadium

Qualifying / Elimination Finals
3	Rabaul Gurias	14
6	Hela Wigmen	22
4	Lae Snax Tigers	10
5	Mendi Muruks	8

Major / Minor Semi-finals
1	Mt Hagen Eagles	16
2	Enga Mioks	12
4	Lae Snax Tigers	12
6	Hela Wigmen	32

Preliminary Final
2	Enga Mioks	12
6	Hela Wigmen	20

Grand Final
1	Mt Hagen Eagles	28
6	Hela Wigmen	20
