= 2022 PNGNRL season results =

Rugby League in Papua New Guinea

The 2022 PNGNRL season was the 32nd season of the professional rugby league competition in Papua New Guinea. It was known by the sponsorship name, Digicel Cup.

== Regular season ==
All times are in AEST (UTC+10:00) and AEDT (UTC+11:00) on the relevant dates.

The 2022 PNGNRL season was the 32nd season of the professional rugby league competition in Papua New Guinea. It was known by the sponsorship name, Digicel Cup.

=== Round 1 ===
Home	Score	Away	Match Information			
Home	Score	Away	Date and Time	Venue	Referee	Attendance
Port Moresby Vipers	22–8	Mt. Hagen Eagles	24 April 2022, 15:00	Santos National Football Stadium		
Mendi Muruks	22–12	Kimbe Cutters	24 April 2022, 13:00	Lae Rugby League Ground, Lae		
Lae Snax Tigers	38–14	Central Dabaris	24 April 2022, 15:00	Lae Rugby League Ground, Lae		
Goroka Lahanis	10–12	Hela Wigmen	24 April 2022, 15:00	National Sports Institute, Goroka		
Enga Mioks	16–18	Rabaul Gurias	24 April 2022, 15:00	Aipus Oval, Wabag		
Gulf Isou	16–8	Waghi Tumbe	24 April 2022, 15:00	Santos National Football Stadium		

=== Round 2 ===
Home	Score	Away	Match Information			
Home	Score	Away	Date and Time	Venue	Referee	Attendance
Lae Snax Tigers	20–10	Kimbe Cutters	1 May 2022, 15:00	Muthuvel Stadium, Kimbe		
Mendi Muruks	22–20	Mt. Hagen Eagles	1 May 2022, 13:00	Minj		
Enga Mioks	20–14	Hela Wigmen	1 May 2022, 15:00	Santos National Football Stadium		
Waghi Tumbe	20–10	Goroka Lahanis	1 May 2022, 15:00	Minj		
Port Moresby Vipers	9–8	Rabaul Gurias	1 May 2022, 13:00	Santos National Football Stadium		
Gulf Isou	22–16	Central Dabaris	1 May 2022, 15:00	Santos National Football Stadium		

=== Round 3 ===
Home	Score	Away	Match Information			
Home	Score	Away	Date and Time	Venue	Referee	Attendance
Lae Snax Tigers	32–20	Mt. Hagen Eagles	8 May 2022, 13:00	Lae Rugby League Ground, Lae		
Rabaul Gurias	18–0	Mendi Muruks	8 May 2022, 15:00	Lae Rugby League Ground, Lae		
Enga Mioks	8–4	Waghi Tumbe	8 May 2022, 15:00	Aipus Oval, Warbag		
Hela Wigmen	16–12	Port Moresby Vipers	8 May 2022, 11:00	Santos National Football Stadium		
Central Dabaris	28–20	Kimbe Cutters	8 May 2022, 13:00	Santos National Football Stadium		
Gulf Isou	6–0	Goroka Lahanis	8 May 2022, 15:00	Santos National Football Stadium		

=== Round 4 ===
Home	Score	Away	Match Information			
Home	Score	Away	Date and Time	Venue	Referee	Attendance
Rabaul Gurias	30–14	Lae Snax Tigers	14 May 2022, 15:00	Kalabond Oval		
Hela Wigmen	32–16	Mendi Muruks	15 May 2022, 13:00	Santos National Football Stadium		
Mt. Hagen Eagles	13–12	Kimbe Cutters	15 May 2022, 13:30	Jonah Amban Memorial oval, Minj		
Goroka Lahanis	22–20	Central Dabaris	15 May 2022, 14:00	National Sports Institute, Goroka		
Gulf Isou	20–0	Enga Mioks	15 May 2022, 15:30	Santos National Football Stadium		
Waghi Tumbe	10–10	Port Moresby Vipers	15 May 2022, 15:30	Jonah Amban Memorial oval, Minj		

=== Round 5 ===
Home	Score	Away	Match Information			
Home	Score	Away	Date and Time	Venue	Referee	Attendance
Rabaul Gurias	26–14	Kimbe Cutters	22 May 2022, 15:00	Kimbe		
Port Moresby Vipers	28–18	Gulf Isou	22 May 2022, 13:00	Santos National Football Stadium		
CPG Central Dabaris	30–20	Wamp Nga Mt.Hagen Eagles	22 May 2022, 15:30	Santos National Football Stadium		
Enga Mioks	18–16	Goroka Lahanis	22 May 2022, 15:00	Aipus Oval, Wabag		
Mendi Muruks	18–12	Waghi Tumbe	22 May 2022, 13:00	Lae Rugby League Ground, Lae		
Lae Snax Tigers	44–12	Hela Wigmen	22 May 2022, 15:00	Lae Rugby League Ground, Lae		

=== Round 6 ===
Home	Score	Away	Match Information			
Home	Score	Away	Date and Time	Venue	Referee	Attendance
Waghi Tumbe	18–6	Lae Snax Tigers	28 May 2022, 15:00	Minj		
Rabaul Gurias	26–8	Mt. Hagen Eagles	28 May 2022, 15:00	Kalabond Oval, Kokopo		
Enga Mioks	24–12	Central Dabaris	29 May 2022, 15:00	Aipus Oval, Wabag		
Goroka Lahanis	46–22	Port Moresby Vipers	29 May 2022, 14:00	Sir Danny Leahy Oval, Goroka		
Hela Wigmen	22–14	Kimbe Cutters	29 May 2022, 13:00	Santos National Football Stadium		
Mendi Muruks	30–20	Gulf Isou	29 May 2022, 15:00	Santos National Football Stadium		

=== Round 7 ===
Home	Score	Away	Match Information			
Home	Score	Away	Date and Time	Venue	Referee	Attendance
Kimbe Cutters	28–0	Waghi Tumbe	4 June 2022, 14:00	Humphreys Oval, Kimbe, WNBP		
Port Moresby Vipers	16–12	Enga Mioks	5 June 2022, 13:00	Santos National Football Stadium		
Mendi Muruks	24–16	Goroka Lahanis	5 June 2022, 13:00	Lae Rugby League Ground, Lae, MP		
Hela Wigmen	22–14	Mt. Hagen Eagles	5 June 2022, 14:00	John Ambane Oval, Minj, Jiwaka		
Lae Snax Tigers	10–10	Gulf Isou	5 June 2022, 15:00	Lae Rugby League Ground, Lae, Morobe		
Rabaul Gurias	42–12	Central Dabaris	5 June 2022, 15:30	Santos National Football Stadium		

=== Round 8 ===
Home	Score	Away	Match Information			
Home	Score	Away	Date and Time	Venue	Referee	Attendance
Kimbe Cutters	10–4	Gulf Isou	12 June 2022, 11:00	Santos National Football Stadium		
Mt. Hagen Eagles	22–14	Waghi Tumbe	12 June 2022, 14:00	John Ambane Oval, Minj		
Central Dabaris	14–10	Port Moresby Vipers	12 June 2022, 13:00	Santos National Football Stadium		
Goroka Lahanis	14–12	Lae Snax Tigers	12 June 2022, 14:00	Lopi Oval, Goroka		
Mendi Muruks	26–24	Enga Mioks	12 June 2022, 14:00	Aipus Oval, Wabag		
Hela Wigmen	18–6	Rabaul Gurias	12 June 2022, 15:30	Santos National Football Stadium		

=== Round 9 ===
Home	Score	Away	Match Information			
Home	Score	Away	Date and Time	Venue	Referee	Attendance
Waghi Tumbe	29–22	Rabaul Gurias	18 June 2022, 14:00	Kalabond Oval, Kokopo		
Kimbe Cutters	24–20	Goroka Lahanis	18 June 2022, 14:00	Humphreys Oval, Kimbe		
Mendi Muruks	35–16	Port Moresby Vipers	19 June 2022, 13:00	Lae League Ground, Lae		
Mt. Hagen Eagles	18–4	Gulf Isou	19 June 2022, 14:00	Jonah Amban Oval, Minj		
Central Dabaris	12–8	Hela Wigmen	19 June 2022, 14:00	Santos National Football Stadium		
Lae Snax Tigers	22–10	Enga Mioks	19 June 2022, 15:00	Lae League Ground, Lae		

=== Round 10 ===
Home	Score	Away	Match Information			
Home	Score	Away	Date and Time	Venue	Referee	Attendance
Rabaul Gurias	34–10	Gulf Isou	25 June 2022, 14:00	Kalabond Oval, Kokopo		
Hela Wigmen	28–14	Waghi Tumbe	26 June 2022, 15:00	Santos National Football Stadium		
Mendi Muruks	36–12	Central Dabaris	26 June 2022, 13:00	Lae Rugby League Ground, Lae		
Goroka Lahanis	28–8	Mt. Hagen Eagles	26 June 2022, 14:00	Lopi Oval, Goroka		
Lae Snax Tigers	20–16	Port Moresby Vipers	26 June 2022, 15:00	Santos National Football Stadium		
Enga Mioks	14–6	Kimbe Cutters	26 June 2022, 15:00	Lae Rugby League Ground, Lae		

=== Round 11 ===
Home	Score	Away	Match Information			
Home	Score	Away	Date and Time	Venue	Referee	Attendance
Kimbe Cutters	20–14	Port Moresby Vipers	2 July 2022, 14:00	Humphreys Oval, Kimbe		
Rabaul Gurias	30–14	Goroka Lahanis	2 July 2022, 14:00	Kalabond Oval, Kokopo		
Enga Mioks	26–12	Mt. Hagen Eagles	3 July 2022, 13:00	Lae League Ground, Lae		
Hela Wigmen	14–12	Gulf Isou	3 July 2022, 13:00	Santos National Football Stadium		
Mendi Muruks	16–12	Lae Snax Tigers	3 July 2022, 15:00	Lae League Ground, Lae		
Central Dabaris	40–18	Waghi Tumbe	3 July 2022, 15:00	Santos National Football Stadium		

=== Round 12 ===
Home	Score	Away	Match Information			
Home	Score	Away	Date and Time	Venue	Referee	Attendance
Port Moresby Vipers	18–14	Mt. Hagen Eagles	23 July 2022, 12:30	Santos National Football Stadium		
Rabaul Gurias	20–12	Enga Mioks	23 July 2022, 14:00	Kalabond Oval, Kokopo		
Mendi Muruks	30–26	Kimbe Cutters	23 July 2022, 14:00	Humphreys Oval, Kimbe		
Waghi Tumbe	10–8	Gulf Isou	24 July 2022, 11:00	Santos National Football Stadium		
Hela Wigmen	22–12	Goroka Lahanis	24 July 2022, 13:00	Santos National Football Stadium		
Lae Snax Tigers	21–20	Central Dabaris	24 July 2022, 15:00	Santos National Football Stadium		

=== Round 13 ===
Home	Score	Away	Match Information			
Home	Score	Away	Date and Time	Venue	Referee	Attendance
Rabaul Gurias	26–24	Port Moresby Vipers	31 July 2022, 11:00	PNG Football Stadium		
Mendi Muruks	36–6	Mt. Hagen Eagles	31 July 2022, 12:30	Lae Rugby League Ground, Lae		
Goroka Lahanis	22–12	Waghi Tumbe	31 July 2022, 14:00	Lopi Oval, Goroka		
Hela Wigmen	22–12	Enga Mioks	31 July 2022, 15:00	PNG Football Stadium		
Lae Snax Tigers	28–4	Kimbe Cutters	31 July 2022, 15:00	Lae League Ground, Lae		
Vitis Central Dabaris	24–6	Gulf Isou	31 July 2022, 13:00	Santos National Football Stadium		

=== Round 14 ===
Home	Score	Away	Match Information			
Home	Score	Away	Date and Time	Venue	Referee	Attendance
Rabaul Gurias	28–20	Mendi Muruks	6 August 2022, 14:00	Kalabond Oval, Kokopo		
Kimbe Cutters	34–18	Central Dabaris	6 August 2022, 14:00	Humphreys Oval, Kimbe		
Lae Snax Tigers	18–18	Mt. Hagen Eagles	7 August 2022, 13:00	Lae Rugby League Grounds		
Gulf Isou	18–18	Goroka Lahanis	7 August 2022, 13:00	Santos National Football Stadium		
Enga Mioks	20–14	Waghi Tumbe	7 August 2022, 15:00	Lae Rugby League Grounds		
Port Moresby Vipers	14–26	Hela Wigmen	7 August 2022, 15:00	Santos National Football Stadium		

=== Round 15 ===
Home	Score	Away	Match Information			
Home	Score	Away	Date and Time	Venue	Referee	Attendance
Gulf Isou	10–8	Enga Mioks	13 August 2022, 15:00	PNG Football Stadium		
Kimbe Cutters	12–12	Wamp Nga Mt.Hagen Eagles	13 August 2022, 14:00	Humphreys Oval, Kimbe		
Mendi Muruks	23–16	Hela Wigmen	14 August 2022, 13:00	Lae Rugby League Ground, Lae		
Central Dabaris	16–14	Goroka Lahanis	14 August 2022, 13:00	Santos National Football Stadium		
Port Moresby Vipers	28–14	Waghi Tumbe	14 August 2022, 15:00	Santos National Football Stadium		
Lae Snax Tigers	14–12	Rabaul Gurias	14 August 2022, 15:00	Lae Rugby League Ground, Lae		

=== Round 16 ===
Home	Score	Away	Match Information			
Home	Score	Away	Date and Time	Venue	Referee	Attendance
Rabaul Gurias	48–18	Kimbe Cutters	20 August 2022, 14:00	Kalabond Oval, Kokopo		
Central Dabaris	14–13	Mt. Hagen Eagles	21 August 2022, 11:00	Santos National Football Stadium		
Port Moresby Vipers	18–18	Gulf Isou	21 August 2022, 13:00	Santos National Football Stadium		
Enga Mioks	16–12	Goroka Lahanis	21 August 2022, 13:00	Lae Rugby League Ground		
Mendi Muruks	44–22	Waghi Tumbe	21 August 2022, 15:00	Lae Rugby League Ground		
Hela Wigmen	18–14	Lae Snax Tigers	21 August 2022, 15:30	Santos National Football Stadium		

=== Round 17 ===
Home	Score	Away	Match Information			
Home	Score	Away	Date and Time	Venue	Referee	Attendance
Hela Wigmen	20–14	Kimbe Cutters	27 August 2022, 14:00	Humphreys Oval, Kimbe		
Port Moresby Vipers	26–20	Goroka Lahanis	28 August 2022, 11:00	Santos National Football Stadium		
Lae Snax Tigers	20–0 (forfeit)	Waghi Tumbe	28 August 2022, 12:30	Lae League Ground, Lae		
Rabaul Gurias	56–16	Mt. Hagen Eagles	28 August 2022, 13:00	Santos National Football Stadium		
Mendi Muruks	26–18	Gulf Isou	28 August 2022, 15:00	Lae League Ground, Lae		
Central Dabaris	22–8	Enga Mioks	28 August 2022, 15:30	Santos National Football Stadium		
