= 2022 PNGNRL season =

Papua New Guinea rugby league season

2022 Papua New Guinea National Rugby League (Digicel Cup)
- Duration: April 24 – September 24, 2022
- Teams: 12
- Premiers: Hela Wigmen (3rd title)
- Minor premiers: Mendi Muruks
- Broadcast partners: Digicel (Subscription)
- Player of the year: Morea Morea Jnr
- Top try-scorer(s): Douglas Pirika

The 2022 season of Papua New Guinea National Rugby League competition was the 32nd season of the premier rugby league competition in Papua New Guinea since 1991.

== Teams ==
The competition will still have 12 franchise teams competing in 2022 even though five bid teams submitted their bids to join an expanded competition. The five bid teams were Sepik Pride, Simbu Angras, Motu Koita Clansmen, New Ireland Chiefs and Moresby South Blacks.

== Ladder ==
Pos	Team	Pld	W	D	L	B	PF	PA	PD	Pts
1	Mendi Muruks	17	14	0	3	0	424	310	114	28
2	Rabaul Gurias	17	13	0	4	0	450	248	202	26
3	Hela Wigmen	17	13	0	4	0	322	263	59	26
4	Lae Snax Tigers	16	9	2	5	0	345	242	83	22
5	Central Dabaris	17	9	0	8	0	324	356	-32	18
6	Enga Mioks	17	8	0	9	0	248	266	-18	16
7	Port Moresby Vipers	17	7	2	8	0	303	325	-22	16
8	Gulf Isou	17	5	3	9	0	220	272	-52	13
9	Goroka Lahanis	17	5	1	11	0	294	306	-12	11
10	Kimbe Cutters	17	5	1	11	0	278	339	-61	11
11	Waghi Tumbe	16	4	1	10	0	217	350	-133	8
12	Mt. Hagen Eagles	17	3	2	12	0	250	400	-150	8

- The team highlighted in blue has clinched the minor premiership
- Teams highlighted in green have qualified for the finals
- The team highlighted in red has clinched the wooden spoon

== Finals series ==
Home	Score	Away	Match Information
Home	Score	Away	Date and Time (Local)	Venue
Elimination Finals
Hela Wigmen	20 – 18	Enga Mioks	4 September 2022, 1:00pm	National Football Stadium
Lae Snax Tigers	22 – 14	Central Dabaris	4 September 2022, 3:30pm	National Football Stadium
Major / Minor Semi-finals
Hela Wigmen	16– 14	Lae Snax Tigers	10 September 2017, 1:00pm	National Football Stadium
Mendi Muruks	14 – 16	Rabaul Gurias	11 September 2017, 3:30pm	National Football Stadium
Preliminary Final
Mendi Muruks	6 – 12	Hela Wigmen	18 September 2022, 3:00pm	National Football Stadium
Grand Final
Hela Wigmen	8 – 6	Rabaul Gurias	24 September 2022, 3:00pm	National Football Stadium

Qualifying / Elimination Finals
3	Hela Wigmen	20
6	Enga Mioks	18
4	Lae Snax Tigers	22
5	Central Dabaris	14

Major / Minor Semi-finals
1	Mendi Muruks	14
2	Rabaul Gurias	16
3	Hela Wigmen	16
4	Lae Snax Tigers	14

Preliminary Final
1	Mendi Muruks	6
3	Hela Wigmen	12

Grand Final
2	Rabaul Gurias	6
3	Hela Wigmen	8
