= 2021 PNGNRL season =

Papua New Guinea rugby league season

2021 Papua New Guinea National Rugby League (Digicel Cup)
- Teams: 12
- Broadcast partners: NTS (Free-To-Air), Digicel (Subscription)

The 2021 season of Papua New Guinea National Rugby League competition will be the 31st season of the premier rugby league competition in Papua New Guinea since 1991.

== Teams ==
The competition will still have 12 franchise teams competing in 2021.

== Ladder ==
Pos	Team	Pld	W	D	L	B	PF	PA	PD	Pts
1	Lae Snax Tigers	11	9	0	2	0	284	170	114	18
2	Mendi Muruks	11	9	0	2	0	240	147	93	18
3	Waghi Tumbe	11	9	0	2	0	240	150	90	18
4	Port Moresby Vipers	11	8	1	2	0	183	132	51	17
5	Hela Wigmen	11	6	0	5	0	209	150	59	12
6	Rabaul Gurias	11	4	1	6	0	202	188	14	9
7	Mt. Hagen Eagles	11	4	1	6	0	182	223	-41	9
8	Enga Mioks	11	3	1	7	0	184	208	-24	7
9	Goroka Lahanis	11	3	1	7	0	143	226	-83	7
10	Gulf Isou	11	3	1	7	0	150	257	-107	7
11	Central Dabaris	11	2	2	7	0	188	280	-92	6
12	Kimbe Cutters	11	1	2	8	0	166	340	-174	4

- The team highlighted in blue has clinched the minor premiership
- Teams highlighted in green have qualified for the finals
- The team highlighted in red has clinched the wooden spoon
