= 2026 PNGNRL season =

Season of the Papua New Guinea National Rugby League

- League: Papua New Guinea National Rugby League
- Duration: 12 April – 13 September 2026
- Teams: 12
- Minor premiers: PRK Mendi Muruks
- Wooden spoon: PRK Gulf Isou
- Top points scorer: Mark Alunga (ENB Gurias)
- Player of the year: Francis Sam (Mendi Muruks)

2026 season
- Premiers: ENB Agmark Gurias
- Runners-up: PRK Mendi Muruks
- Top try-scorer: Manase Watt (Port Moresby Vipers)

The 2026 PNGNRL season, known for sponsorship reasons as the 2026 Digicel ExxonMobil Cup, was the 36th season of the Papua New Guinea National Rugby League (PNGNRL) competition, the premier domestic rugby league competition in Papua New Guinea. Twelve clubs contested the season, which ran from 12 April to 13 September 2026.

The East New Britain Agmark Gurias won the premiership, defeating the PRK Mendi Muruks 26–14 in the grand final at the Santos National Football Stadium in Port Moresby on 13 September 2026. It was the Gurias' seventh title and their first since 2015, ending an 11-year premiership drought. The Muruks, who had finished the regular season as minor premiers for the second successive year, lost a second consecutive grand final.

The season was the first for the Kandes Rugby League Club, a new franchise based in Madang Province, which replaced the Kimbe Cutters. The Kandes led the competition ladder for much of the season and reached the preliminary final in their debut year.

== Background ==
The 2026 season was launched at the Gateway Hotel in Port Moresby on 2 April 2026, in the presence of the Minister for Higher Education, Research, Science and Technology and Sports, Kinoka Feo, and representatives of the twelve franchises.

PNGNRL Competition chairman Adrian Chow described the competition as the largest sporting competition in Papua New Guinea and said the season marked the fourth year of the competition's five-year strategic plan. Preparations included annual club audits covering governance, financial stability, venues and facilities, along with capacity-building programmes for franchise managers, coaches, referees, team and ground managers and match-day doctors. Chow also announced the introduction of under-19 female and under-17 male competitions, alongside the under-19 male competition launched in 2025.

On 8 April 2026, Digicel PNG confirmed the continuation of its naming-rights co-sponsorship of the competition for a further three years (2026–2028), alongside co-sponsor ExxonMobil. The PNGNRL Competition noted that the competition had grown from eight to twelve clubs since the two companies became naming-rights sponsors. Other sponsors and partners for the season included Kumul Mineral Holdings, Kumul Petroleum, Santos, PacificAus Sports, the WR Carpenter Group and Coca-Cola Europacific Partners.

=== Team changes ===
The Kandes Rugby League Club, based in Madang, was admitted to the competition in October 2025 after unsuccessful bids in 2023 and 2024, taking the place of the Kimbe Cutters, who did not meet franchise compliance requirements. The club draws players from across the Momase Region, including Madang, Morobe, East Sepik and West Sepik. Sepik Pride and Simbu Warriors also submitted bids for 2026 entry but were unsuccessful.

The franchise is referred to in some reports as the Morobe Kandes; announcing its admission at the season launch, chairman Adrian Chow described it as "the Morobe Kandes, based in Madang Province". Franchise manager Stephen Clay Koimi had earlier described the club's entry as a victory for perseverance and regional representation.

== Teams ==
| Team | Home venue | City/area | Province | Coach |
|---|---|---|---|---|
| Gas Resource Central Dabaris | Santos National Football Stadium / Sir John Guise Stadium | Port Moresby | Central | |
| ENB Agmark Gurias | Queen Elizabeth Park | Rabaul | East New Britain | Wartovo Puara Jr |
| NPL Enga Mioks | Aipus Oval | Wabag | Enga | |
| Bintangor Goroka Lahanis | National Sports Institute | Goroka | Eastern Highlands | Michael Moses |
| PRK Gulf Isou | Santos National Football Stadium | Port Moresby | Gulf | |
| Kroton Hela Wigmen | Santos National Football Stadium / Sir John Guise Stadium | Port Moresby | Hela | Andrew Andiki |
| Kandes Rugby League Club | Ron Albert Oval | Madang | Madang | Stanley Tepend |
| Lae Snax Tigers | Lae Rugby League Ground | Lae | Morobe | |
| PRK Mendi Muruks | Lae Rugby League Ground | Lae (relocated from Mendi) | Southern Highlands | Roderick Puname |
| Wamp Nga Mt Hagen Eagles | John Ambane Oval | Minj (relocated from Mount Hagen) | Western Highlands | Henry Wan |
| Moni Plus NCDC POM Vipers | Santos National Football Stadium / Sir John Guise Stadium | Port Moresby | National Capital District | |
| Asila Waghi Tumbe | John Ambane Oval | Minj | Jiwaka | |

Home venues are those at which each club hosted matches during the season.

== Events ==
The season opened on 12 April 2026 with the Kandes meeting the ENB Agmark Gurias. The fixture had originally been scheduled for Ron Albert Oval in Madang but was relocated to the Lae Rugby League Ground after storm damage rendered the Madang venue unfit for play.

=== Crowd disturbances ===
Two matches during the season were affected by crowd trouble. The Round 14 fixture between the Muruks and Asila Waghi Tumbe at John Ambane Oval, Minj, on 18 July, won 22–16 by the Muruks after they had trailed 16–6 at half-time, was marred by bottles being thrown onto the field and perimeter fencing being breached.

The Round 17 match between the Lae Snax Tigers and the Wamp Nga Mt Hagen Eagles at Lae Rugby League Ground was abandoned in the 50th minute, with the Tigers leading 12–6 and 30 minutes remaining, after crowd disturbances raised safety concerns for players, match officials and team personnel. Following a review, the PNGNRL Competition awarded one competition point to each club, and moved the Round 18 fixture between the Tigers and the Gas Resource Central Dabaris from Lae to Port Moresby; no matches were played in Lae in the final round. Chief operating officer Tony Archer said the decision had not been taken lightly, noting that Lae Rugby League had hosted matches for many years and had successfully staged the Super Round in Round 16, and that the competition would work with the venue towards its return in 2027. The point apiece is reflected in the final ladder, and the match is recorded in the official results as a scoreless draw, the 12–6 scoreline standing at the time of the abandonment being expunged.

== Regular season ==
The regular season ran over 18 rounds from 12 April to 16 August, with matches usually played on Sundays and a break on the weekend of 28 June. Four rounds were given themed designations in the season draw. Round 3 was staged as the "Men in League Round" and the first "Super Round", with three of its six matches played at the National Sports Institute in Goroka; Round 9 was the "Amazing Round", with all six matches at the Santos National Football Stadium in Port Moresby; Round 16 was the second "Super Round", with three matches at the Lae Rugby League Ground; and Round 17 was the "Women in League Round".

The Kandes topped the ladder after nine rounds following a 22–14 win over the Muruks during the "Amazing Round" at the Santos National Football Stadium. The lead changed hands repeatedly in the closing rounds, with the Muruks ultimately securing the minor premiership on points differential after both they and the Kandes finished on 26 points.

The reigning premiers, the Lae Snax Tigers, failed to qualify for the finals.

=== Results ===
All results are from the competition's official draw. Winning teams are shown in bold.

=== Round 1 ===
| Date | Home | Score | Away | Venue |
|---|---|---|---|---|
| 12 April 2026 | **Gas Resource Central Dabaris** | **34** – 18 | Asila Waghi Tumbe | Santos National Football Stadium |
| 12 April 2026 | **PRK Gulf Isou** | **20** – 16 | PRK Mendi Muruks | Santos National Football Stadium |
| 12 April 2026 | NPL Enga Mioks | 10 – **22** | **Moni Plus NCDC POM Vipers** | National Sports Institute, Goroka |
| 12 April 2026 | **Bintangor Goroka Lahanis** | **30** – 22 | Wamp Nga Mt Hagen Eagles | National Sports Institute, Goroka |
| 12 April 2026 | **Kandes RLC** | **26** – 16 | ENB Agmark Gurias | Lae Rugby League Ground |
| 12 April 2026 | **Kroton Hela Wigmen** | **28** – 18 | Lae Snax Tigers | Santos National Football Stadium |

=== Round 2 ===
| Date | Home | Score | Away | Venue |
|---|---|---|---|---|
| 18 April 2026 | **Asila Waghi Tumbe** | **26** – 22 | NPL Enga Mioks | John Ambane Oval, Minj |
| 18 April 2026 | **Moni Plus NCDC POM Vipers** | **18** – 12 | PRK Gulf Isou | Santos National Football Stadium |
| 18 April 2026 | **ENB Agmark Gurias** | **30** – 18 | Bintangor Goroka Lahanis | Queen Elizabeth Park, Rabaul |
| 18 April 2026 | Wamp Nga Mt Hagen Eagles | 22 – **23** | **Kroton Hela Wigmen** | John Ambane Oval, Minj |
| 19 April 2026 | Kandes RLC | 16 – **30** | **Gas Resource Central Dabaris** | Ron Albert Oval, Madang |
| 19 April 2026 | **PRK Mendi Muruks** | **18** – 10 | Lae Snax Tigers | Lae Rugby League Ground |

=== Round 3 ===
Round 3 was staged as the "Men in League Round" and the first "Super Round".

| Date | Home | Score | Away | Venue |
|---|---|---|---|---|
| 25 April 2026 | **ENB Agmark Gurias** | **22** – 16 | Wamp Nga Mt Hagen Eagles | Queen Elizabeth Park, Rabaul |
| 26 April 2026 | **PRK Mendi Muruks** | **22** – 20 | Asila Waghi Tumbe | National Sports Institute, Goroka |
| 26 April 2026 | Lae Snax Tigers | 20 – 20 | Kandes RLC | National Sports Institute, Goroka |
| 26 April 2026 | Gas Resource Central Dabaris | 10 – **24** | **Moni Plus NCDC POM Vipers** | Sir John Guise Stadium, Port Moresby |
| 26 April 2026 | **Bintangor Goroka Lahanis** | **26** – 20 | PRK Gulf Isou | National Sports Institute, Goroka |
| 26 April 2026 | Kroton Hela Wigmen | 6 – **9** | **NPL Enga Mioks** | Sir John Guise Stadium, Port Moresby |

=== Round 4 ===
| Date | Home | Score | Away | Venue |
|---|---|---|---|---|
| 2 May 2026 | **Gas Resource Central Dabaris** | **38** – 20 | ENB Agmark Gurias | Santos National Football Stadium |
| 2 May 2026 | Wamp Nga Mt Hagen Eagles | 16 – **18** | **Kandes RLC** | John Ambane Oval, Minj |
| 2 May 2026 | PRK Gulf Isou | 12 – **20** | **Kroton Hela Wigmen** | Santos National Football Stadium |
| 2 May 2026 | Asila Waghi Tumbe | 20 – **26** | **Moni Plus NCDC POM Vipers** | John Ambane Oval, Minj |
| 3 May 2026 | NPL Enga Mioks | 6 – **30** | **PRK Mendi Muruks** | Aipus Oval, Wabag |
| 3 May 2026 | Lae Snax Tigers | 14 – 14 | Bintangor Goroka Lahanis | Lae Rugby League Ground |

=== Round 5 ===
| Date | Home | Score | Away | Venue |
|---|---|---|---|---|
| 9 May 2026 | **Wamp Nga Mt Hagen Eagles** | **18** – 16 | Gas Resource Central Dabaris | John Ambane Oval, Minj |
| 9 May 2026 | **ENB Agmark Gurias** | **28** – 18 | Lae Snax Tigers | Queen Elizabeth Park, Rabaul |
| 9 May 2026 | **Kandes RLC** | **26** – 12 | PRK Gulf Isou | Ron Albert Oval, Madang |
| 10 May 2026 | Moni Plus NCDC POM Vipers | 10 – **12** | **PRK Mendi Muruks** | Santos National Football Stadium |
| 10 May 2026 | **NPL Enga Mioks** | **36** – 12 | Bintangor Goroka Lahanis | Aipus Oval, Wabag |
| 10 May 2026 | **Kroton Hela Wigmen** | **30** – 8 | Asila Waghi Tumbe | Santos National Football Stadium |

=== Round 6 ===
| Date | Home | Score | Away | Venue |
|---|---|---|---|---|
| 16 May 2026 | PRK Gulf Isou | 26 – **38** | **ENB Agmark Gurias** | Santos National Football Stadium |
| 16 May 2026 | **Kandes RLC** | **18** – 8 | NPL Enga Mioks | Ron Albert Oval, Madang |
| 16 May 2026 | Kroton Hela Wigmen | 10 – **12** | **Moni Plus NCDC POM Vipers** | Santos National Football Stadium |
| 17 May 2026 | **PRK Mendi Muruks** | **26** – 12 | Gas Resource Central Dabaris | Lae Rugby League Ground |
| 17 May 2026 | Bintangor Goroka Lahanis | 24 – **26** | **Asila Waghi Tumbe** | National Sports Institute, Goroka |
| 17 May 2026 | Lae Snax Tigers | 10 – **24** | **Wamp Nga Mt Hagen Eagles** | Lae Rugby League Ground |

=== Round 7 ===
| Date | Home | Score | Away | Venue |
|---|---|---|---|---|
| 23 May 2026 | **Wamp Nga Mt Hagen Eagles** | **30** – 14 | PRK Gulf Isou | John Ambane Oval, Minj |
| 23 May 2026 | ENB Agmark Gurias | 24 – 24 | NPL Enga Mioks | Queen Elizabeth Park, Rabaul |
| 23 May 2026 | Asila Waghi Tumbe | 20 – **32** | **Kandes RLC** | John Ambane Oval, Minj |
| 24 May 2026 | Gas Resource Central Dabaris | 18 – **20** | **Lae Snax Tigers** | Sir John Guise Stadium, Port Moresby |
| 24 May 2026 | PRK Mendi Muruks | 12 – **24** | **Kroton Hela Wigmen** | Lae Rugby League Ground |
| 24 May 2026 | Moni Plus NCDC POM Vipers | 12 – **18** | **Bintangor Goroka Lahanis** | Sir John Guise Stadium, Port Moresby |

=== Round 8 ===
| Date | Home | Score | Away | Venue |
|---|---|---|---|---|
| 30 May 2026 | Asila Waghi Tumbe | 18 – **22** | **PRK Gulf Isou** | John Ambane Oval, Minj |
| 31 May 2026 | **Lae Snax Tigers** | **24** – 16 | Moni Plus NCDC POM Vipers | Lae Rugby League Ground |
| 31 May 2026 | NPL Enga Mioks | 13 – **18** | **Gas Resource Central Dabaris** | Aipus Oval, Wabag |
| 31 May 2026 | Bintangor Goroka Lahanis | 14 – 14 | Kandes RLC | National Sports Institute, Goroka |
| 31 May 2026 | Kroton Hela Wigmen | 24 – **34** | **ENB Agmark Gurias** | Sir John Guise Stadium, Port Moresby |
| 31 May 2026 | **PRK Mendi Muruks** | **30** – 10 | Wamp Nga Mt Hagen Eagles | Lae Rugby League Ground |

=== Round 9 ===
Round 9 was the "Amazing Round", with all six matches at one venue.

| Date | Home | Score | Away | Venue |
|---|---|---|---|---|
| 6 June 2026 | PRK Gulf Isou | 14 – 14 | Gas Resource Central Dabaris | Santos National Football Stadium |
| 6 June 2026 | **Lae Snax Tigers** | **16** – 12 | NPL Enga Mioks | Santos National Football Stadium |
| 6 June 2026 | **Kandes RLC** | **22** – 14 | PRK Mendi Muruks | Santos National Football Stadium |
| 7 June 2026 | **Wamp Nga Mt Hagen Eagles** | **26** – 12 | Asila Waghi Tumbe | Santos National Football Stadium |
| 7 June 2026 | Bintangor Goroka Lahanis | 8 – 8 | Kroton Hela Wigmen | Santos National Football Stadium |
| 7 June 2026 | **Moni Plus NCDC POM Vipers** | **42** – 12 | ENB Agmark Gurias | Santos National Football Stadium |

=== Round 10 ===
| Date | Home | Score | Away | Venue |
|---|---|---|---|---|
| 13 June 2026 | Asila Waghi Tumbe | **14** – 12 | Lae Snax Tigers | John Ambane Oval, Minj |
| 13 June 2026 | ENB Agmark Gurias | **28** – 12 | PRK Mendi Muruks | Queen Elizabeth Park, Rabaul |
| 13 June 2026 | Kandes RLC | **22** – 8 | Kroton Hela Wigmen | Ron Albert Oval, Madang |
| 13 June 2026 | Wamp Nga Mt Hagen Eagles | **24** – 20 | Moni Plus NCDC POM Vipers | John Ambane Oval, Minj |
| 14 June 2026 | NPL Enga Mioks | **32** – 30 | PRK Gulf Isou | Aipus Oval, Wabag |
| 14 June 2026 | Bintangor Goroka Lahanis | **24** – 16 | Gas Resource Central Dabaris | National Sports Institute, Goroka |

=== Round 11 ===
| Date | Home | Score | Away | Venue |
|---|---|---|---|---|
| 20 June 2026 | **Wamp Nga Mt Hagen Eagles** | **22** – 18 | NPL Enga Mioks | John Ambane Oval, Minj |
| 20 June 2026 | **ENB Agmark Gurias** | **38** – 20 | Asila Waghi Tumbe | Queen Elizabeth Park, Rabaul |
| 20 June 2026 | Kandes RLC | 16 – 16 | Moni Plus NCDC POM Vipers | Ron Albert Oval, Madang |
| 21 June 2026 | **PRK Mendi Muruks** | **28** – 18 | Bintangor Goroka Lahanis | Lae Rugby League Ground |
| 21 June 2026 | Gas Resource Central Dabaris | 12 – **32** | **Kroton Hela Wigmen** | Santos National Football Stadium |
| 21 June 2026 | **Lae Snax Tigers** | **18** – 14 | PRK Gulf Isou | Lae Rugby League Ground |

=== Round 12 ===
| Date | Home | Score | Away | Venue |
|---|---|---|---|---|
| 5 July 2026 | PRK Gulf Isou | 8 – **12** | **Moni Plus NCDC POM Vipers** | Santos National Football Stadium |
| 5 July 2026 | **Gas Resource Central Dabaris** | **18** – 14 | Kandes RLC | Santos National Football Stadium |
| 5 July 2026 | **NPL Enga Mioks** | **42** – 18 | Asila Waghi Tumbe | Aipus Oval, Wabag |
| 5 July 2026 | Lae Snax Tigers | 8 – **14** | **PRK Mendi Muruks** | Lae Rugby League Ground |
| 5 July 2026 | Kroton Hela Wigmen | 8 – **12** | **Wamp Nga Mt Hagen Eagles** | Santos National Football Stadium |
| 5 July 2026 | **Bintangor Goroka Lahanis** | **20** – 14 | ENB Agmark Gurias | National Sports Institute, Goroka |

=== Round 13 ===
| Date | Home | Score | Away | Venue |
|---|---|---|---|---|
| 11 July 2026 | **Asila Waghi Tumbe** | **36** – 32 | Gas Resource Central Dabaris | John Ambane Oval, Minj |
| 11 July 2026 | **Wamp Nga Mt Hagen Eagles** | **34** – 8 | Bintangor Goroka Lahanis | John Ambane Oval, Minj |
| 12 July 2026 | Lae Snax Tigers | 12 – **16** | **Kroton Hela Wigmen** | Lae Rugby League Ground |
| 12 July 2026 | Moni Plus NCDC POM Vipers | 10 – **14** | **NPL Enga Mioks** | Santos National Football Stadium |
| 12 July 2026 | ENB Agmark Gurias | 12 – 12 | Kandes RLC | Queen Elizabeth Park, Rabaul |
| 12 July 2026 | **PRK Mendi Muruks** | **36** – 12 | PRK Gulf Isou | Lae Rugby League Ground |

=== Round 14 ===
| Date | Home | Score | Away | Venue |
|---|---|---|---|---|
| 18 July 2026 | Wamp Nga Mt Hagen Eagles | 20 – **30** | **ENB Agmark Gurias** | John Ambane Oval, Minj |
| 18 July 2026 | **Kandes RLC** | **16** – 13 | Lae Snax Tigers | Ron Albert Oval, Madang |
| 18 July 2026 | Asila Waghi Tumbe | 16 – **22** | **PRK Mendi Muruks** | John Ambane Oval, Minj |
| 19 July 2026 | **Moni Plus NCDC POM Vipers** | **26** – 10 | Gas Resource Central Dabaris | Santos National Football Stadium |
| 19 July 2026 | **NPL Enga Mioks** | **14** – 10 | Kroton Hela Wigmen | Aipus Oval, Wabag |
| 19 July 2026 | PRK Gulf Isou | 24 – **26** | **Bintangor Goroka Lahanis** | Santos National Football Stadium |

=== Round 15 ===
| Date | Home | Score | Away | Venue |
|---|---|---|---|---|
| 25 July 2026 | **ENB Agmark Gurias** | **44** – 16 | Gas Resource Central Dabaris | Queen Elizabeth Park, Rabaul |
| 25 July 2026 | **Kandes RLC** | **33** – 10 | Wamp Nga Mt Hagen Eagles | Ron Albert Oval, Madang |
| 26 July 2026 | **Kroton Hela Wigmen** | **34** – 4 | PRK Gulf Isou | Santos National Football Stadium |
| 26 July 2026 | **PRK Mendi Muruks** | **24** – 12 | NPL Enga Mioks | Lae Rugby League Ground |
| 26 July 2026 | **Moni Plus NCDC POM Vipers** | **40** – 10 | Asila Waghi Tumbe | Santos National Football Stadium |
| 26 July 2026 | Bintangor Goroka Lahanis | 24 – **28** | **Lae Snax Tigers** | National Sports Institute, Goroka |

=== Round 16 ===
Round 16 included the season's second "Super Round", at the Lae Rugby League Ground.

| Date | Home | Score | Away | Venue |
|---|---|---|---|---|
| 2 August 2026 | Asila Waghi Tumbe | 6 – **18** | **Kroton Hela Wigmen** | Lae Rugby League Ground |
| 2 August 2026 | **Lae Snax Tigers** | **28** – 16 | ENB Agmark Gurias | Lae Rugby League Ground |
| 2 August 2026 | PRK Mendi Muruks | 16 – **20** | **Moni Plus NCDC POM Vipers** | Lae Rugby League Ground |
| 2 August 2026 | Gas Resource Central Dabaris | 24 – **28** | **Wamp Nga Mt Hagen Eagles** | Sir John Guise Stadium, Port Moresby |
| 2 August 2026 | PRK Gulf Isou | 8 – **18** | **Kandes RLC** | Sir John Guise Stadium, Port Moresby |
| 2 August 2026 | **Bintangor Goroka Lahanis** | **40** – 10 | NPL Enga Mioks | National Sports Institute, Goroka |

=== Round 17 ===
Round 17 was the "Women in League Round".

| Date | Home | Score | Away | Venue |
|---|---|---|---|---|
| 8 August 2026 | **ENB Agmark Gurias** | **44** – 18 | PRK Gulf Isou | Queen Elizabeth Park, Rabaul |
| 9 August 2026 | Gas Resource Central Dabaris | 6 – **26** | **PRK Mendi Muruks** | Santos National Football Stadium |
| 9 August 2026 | **NPL Enga Mioks** | **17** – 12 | Kandes RLC | Aipus Oval, Wabag |
| 9 August 2026 | **Bintangor Goroka Lahanis** | **44** – 18 | Asila Waghi Tumbe | National Sports Institute, Goroka |
| 9 August 2026 | Lae Snax Tigers | 0 – 0^{a} | Wamp Nga Mt Hagen Eagles | Lae Rugby League Ground |
| 9 August 2026 | Moni Plus NCDC POM Vipers | 13 – **14** | **Kroton Hela Wigmen** | Santos National Football Stadium |

^{a} Abandoned in the 50th minute because of crowd disturbances, with the Tigers leading 12–6; one competition point was awarded to each club and the match is recorded as a scoreless draw.

=== Round 18 ===
| Date | Home | Score | Away | Venue |
|---|---|---|---|---|
| 16 August 2026 | **PRK Mendi Muruks** | **36** – 26 | Kroton Hela Wigmen | Port Moresby (venue unconfirmed) |
| 16 August 2026 | **Kandes RLC** | **42** – 16 | Asila Waghi Tumbe | Ron Albert Oval, Madang |
| 16 August 2026 | Bintangor Goroka Lahanis | 22 – **24** | **Moni Plus NCDC POM Vipers** | National Sports Institute, Goroka |
| 16 August 2026 | **NPL Enga Mioks** | **36** – 10 | ENB Agmark Gurias | Aipus Oval, Wabag |
| 16 August 2026 | **Wamp Nga Mt Hagen Eagles** | **48** – 6 | PRK Gulf Isou | Port Moresby (venue unconfirmed) |
| 16 August 2026 | **Gas Resource Central Dabaris** | **26** – 22 | Lae Snax Tigers | Port Moresby (venue unconfirmed) |

Round 18 results and venues are as reported by The National; three venues are given only as Port Moresby.

=== Ladder ===
| Pos | Team | Pld | W | D | L | B | PF | PA | PD | Pts |
|---|---|---|---|---|---|---|---|---|---|---|
| 1 | PRK Mendi Muruks | 18 | 13 | 0 | 5 | 0 | 394 | 280 | +114 | 26 |
| 2 | Kandes RLC | 18 | 11 | 4 | 3 | 0 | 377 | 268 | +109 | 26 |
| 3 | Moni Plus NCDC POM Vipers | 18 | 11 | 1 | 6 | 0 | 363 | 262 | +101 | 23 |
| 4 | ENB Agmark Gurias | 18 | 10 | 2 | 6 | 0 | 460 | 414 | +46 | 22 |
| 5 | Kroton Hela Wigmen | 18 | 10 | 1 | 7 | 0 | 339 | 266 | +73 | 21 |
| 6 | Wamp Nga Mt Hagen Eagles | 18 | 10 | 1 | 7 | 0 | 382 | 322 | +60 | 21 |
| 7 | Bintangor Goroka Lahanis | 18 | 8 | 3 | 7 | 0 | 390 | 378 | +12 | 19 |
| 8 | NPL Enga Mioks | 18 | 8 | 1 | 9 | 0 | 335 | 348 | −13 | 17 |
| 9 | Lae Snax Tigers | 18 | 6 | 3 | 9 | 0 | 291 | 318 | −27 | 15 |
| 10 | Gas Resource Central Dabaris | 18 | 6 | 1 | 11 | 0 | 350 | 421 | −71 | 13 |
| 11 | Asila Waghi Tumbe | 18 | 4 | 0 | 14 | 0 | 322 | 528 | −206 | 8 |
| 12 | PRK Gulf Isou | 18 | 2 | 1 | 15 | 0 | 276 | 474 | −198 | 5 |

- Minor premiers
- Qualified for the finals
- Wooden spoon

Two competition points were awarded for a win and one for a draw. The ENB Agmark Gurias, who finished fourth, went on to win the premiership. Source:

The defending premiers, the Lae Snax Tigers, finished ninth. The PRK Gulf Isou took the wooden spoon with two wins, although the Asila Waghi Tumbe, one place above them, conceded more points than any other club.

== Finals series ==
The top six teams contested a four-week finals series at the Santos National Football Stadium in Port Moresby.

| Home | Score | Away | Match Information |
| Home | Score | Away | Date | Venue |
|---|---|---|---|---|
Elimination finals
| ENB Agmark Gurias | 32–18 | Kroton Hela Wigmen | 23 August 2026 | Santos National Football Stadium |
| Moni Plus NCDC POM Vipers | 14–21 | Wamp Nga Mt Hagen Eagles | 23 August 2026 | Santos National Football Stadium |
Major / minor semi-finals
| PRK Mendi Muruks | 18–14 | Kandes Rugby League Club | 30 August 2026 | Santos National Football Stadium |
| ENB Agmark Gurias | 42–22 | Wamp Nga Mt Hagen Eagles | 30 August 2026 | Santos National Football Stadium |
Preliminary final
| ENB Agmark Gurias | 20–18 | Kandes Rugby League Club | 6 September 2026 | Santos National Football Stadium |
Grand final
| ENB Agmark Gurias | 26–14 | PRK Mendi Muruks | 13 September 2026 | Santos National Football Stadium |

In the elimination finals on 23 August the Gurias defeated the Kroton Hela Wigmen 32–18, while the Wamp Nga Mt Hagen Eagles beat the third-placed Moni Plus NCDC POM Vipers 21–14 to end the Vipers' season. In the semi-finals on 30 August, the Muruks beat the Kandes 18–14 to take a direct passage to the grand final, while the Gurias eliminated the Eagles 42–22, scoring eight tries with Mark Alunga kicking at a perfect rate. The Gurias then edged the Kandes 20–18 in the preliminary final on 6 September, ending the newcomers' debut campaign. The win returned the Gurias to the decider for the first time since 2022, when they had lost 8–6 to the Kroton Hela Wigmen at the same venue.

== Grand final ==
The ENB Agmark Gurias beat the PRK Mendi Muruks 26–14 at the Santos National Football Stadium on 13 September 2026 to take the premiership. The Muruks led 14–10 at half-time, but the Gurias shut them out after the break, outscoring them 16–0 in the second half. It was the fourth grand final meeting between the two foundation clubs, following 1996, 2007 and 2012, and the Gurias' second grand final win over the Muruks; the 2012 decider had finished 14–12 in the Gurias' favour.

The premiership ended an 11-year wait for the Gurias, whose previous title had come in 2015 with a 26–18 win over the TNA Simbu Lions. Head coach Wartovo Puara Jr, a former PNG Kumuls hooker in his second season in charge, had played in the club's 2012 grand final win; the 2026 title was his first as a head coach. He dedicated the win to the wider New Guinea Islands region, saying that bringing the cup back to East New Britain after eleven years was special for the club.

The Gurias' campaign was built around three players who had returned to the club from the Lae Snax Tigers before the season: Mark Alunga, captain Terry Wapi and Emmanuel Alfred.

Prime Minister James Marape congratulated both clubs, noting that the match fell three days before Papua New Guinea's 51st anniversary of independence.

== Awards ==
The PNGNRL Competition presented its season awards at the 2026 PNGNRLC Awards Night, covering both the Digicel ExxonMobil Cup and the women's Santos Cup.

| Award | Winner | Club |
|---|---|---|
| Player of the year | Francis Sam | PRK Mendi Muruks |
| Top try scorer | Manase Watt | Port Moresby Vipers |
| Top points scorer | Mark Alunga | ENB Gurias |
| Rookie of the year | Jayden Numapo | Kandes RLC |
| Coach of the year | Roderick Puname | PRK Mendi Muruks |
| Club of the year | Kandes RLC | |
| Referee of the year | Dickson Paul | |

=== Team of the year ===
| Position | Player | Club |
|---|---|---|
| Fullback | Jeremaiah Ben | Port Moresby Vipers |
| Winger | Joel William | Enga Mioks |
| Centre | Jayden Numapo | Kandes RLC |
| Five-eighth | Lote Kuman | Hela Wigmen |
| Halfback | Francis Sam | Mendi Muruks |
| Hooker | Benia Simon | Kandes RLC |
| Prop | Xavier Turi | Hela Wigmen |
| Second row | Dou Tapako | Mendi Muruks |
| Lock | Modekai Waim | Enga Mioks |

== Santos Cup ==
The women's Santos Cup ran alongside the Digicel ExxonMobil Cup, with its finals staged as part of the same match-day programmes. The Gas Resource Central Dabaris won back-to-back Santos Cup titles. Dabaris players took most of the competition's individual awards, including player of the year, top try scorer and top points scorer.

== See also ==
- Papua New Guinea National Rugby League
- Rugby league in Papua New Guinea
