= 2013 PNGNRL season =

Papua New Guinea rugby league season

2013 Papua New Guinea National Rugby League (Digicel Cup)
- Teams: 12
- Premiers: Port Moresby Vipers
- Minor premiers: Goroka Lahanis

The 2013 Papua New Guinea National Rugby League season (or for sponsorship reasons, the 2013 Digicel Cup), was the 24th season of rugby league in Papua New Guinea. The season was won by the Port Moresby Vipers who defeated the Goroka Lahanis, who won the minor premiership, in the grand final.

== Teams ==
2013 PNGNRL Season Teams
Team	Stadium	City/Area
Enga Mioks	Johnson Siki Apus Oval	Wabag, Enga Province
Goroka Lahanis	National Sports Institute	Goroka, Eastern Highlands Province
Gulf Isapea	Lloyd Robson Oval	Port Moresby
Hela Wigmen	Lloyd Robson Oval	Port Moresby
Lae Tigers	Lae League Oval	Lae, Morobe Province
Mendi Muruks	Lae League Oval	Mendi, Southern Highlands Province
Mount Hagen Eagles	Mt. Hagen Showground	Mount Hagen, Western Highlands Province
Port Moresby Vipers	Lloyd Robson Oval	Port Moresby
Rabaul Gurias	Kalabond Oval	Kokopo, East New Britain Province
Simbu Lions	Kundiawa Rugby League Oval	Kundiawa, Simbu Province

== Ladder ==
2013 PNGNRL season
#	Team	Pld	W	D	L	Pts
1	Goroko Lahanis	15	10	1	4	21
2	Rabaul Gurias	15	10	0	5	20
3=	Port Moresby Vipers	15	9	0	6	18
3=	Lae Snax Tigers	15	8	2	5	18
3=	Egna Mioks	15	9	0	6	18
6	Hela Wigman	15	6	2	7	14
7	TNA Simbu Lions	15	7	0	8	10
8=	Mendi Muruks	15	3	3	9	9
8=	Gulf Isapea	15	4	1	10	9
8=	Mount Hagen Eagles	15	4	1	10	9
