= 1991 SP Inter City Cup season =

Papua New Guinea rugby league season

1991 SP Inter-City Cup season
- League: Papua New Guinea National Rugby League
- Duration: 19 May – 11 August 1991
- Teams: 6
- Minor premiers: Port Moresby Vipers

1991 season
- Premiers: Port Moresby Vipers
- Runners-up: Mt Hagen Eagles

The 1991 SP Inter-City Cup season was the second season of the SP Inter-City Cup, a nationwide rugby league club competition in Papua New Guinea. Six clubs contested the competition, which ran from 19 May to 11 August 1991. The Port Moresby Vipers won their second consecutive premiership, drawing 18–18 with the Wamp-Nga Mt Hagen Eagles in the grand final and taking the title on tries scored.

== Teams ==
Six clubs competed, each named with its sponsor:

- LBC Lae City Bombers
- Collins and Leahy Goroka Lahanis
- Sika Kundiawa Warriors
- Curtain Star Mendi Muruks
- Wamp-Nga Mt Hagen Eagles
- Port Moresby Vipers

== Format ==
The competition was played as a double round robin over ten rounds, each club meeting every other club twice. Matches were played on Sundays. The minor premiers advanced directly to the grand final, while the second and third placed clubs met in a preliminary final to decide the other finalist.

== Regular season ==
=== Round 1 ===
Date	Home	Score	Away	Venue
19 May 1991	Port Moresby Vipers	26–28	Mt Hagen Eagles	Lloyd Robson Oval
19 May 1991	Goroka Lahanis	41–26	Mendi Muruks	
19 May 1991	Kundiawa Warriors	14–10	Lae City Bombers	

=== Round 2 ===
Date	Home	Score	Away	Venue
26 May 1991	Mendi Muruks	26–12	Kundiawa Warriors	Tende Rugby League Oval
26 May 1991	Mt Hagen Eagles	18–40	Goroka Lahanis	
26 May 1991	Lae City Bombers	14–26	Port Moresby Vipers	

=== Round 3 ===
Date	Home	Score	Away	Venue
2 June 1991	Lae City Bombers	16–6	Mendi Muruks	
2 June 1991	Goroka Lahanis	20–22	Port Moresby Vipers	Goroka
2 June 1991	Kundiawa Warriors	4–24	Mt Hagen Eagles	

=== Round 4 ===
Date	Home	Score	Away	Venue
9 June 1991	Mt Hagen Eagles	20–20	Mendi Muruks	
9 June 1991	Goroka Lahanis	30–28	Lae City Bombers	
9 June 1991	Port Moresby Vipers	22–14	Kundiawa Warriors	Lloyd Robson Oval

=== Round 5 ===
Date	Home	Score	Away	Venue
16 June 1991	Mt Hagen Eagles	14–9	Lae City Bombers	
16 June 1991	Kundiawa Warriors	40–10	Goroka Lahanis	
16 June 1991	Port Moresby Vipers	30–19	Mendi Muruks	Lloyd Robson Oval

=== Round 6 ===
Date	Home	Score	Away	Venue
23 June 1991	Lae City Bombers	22–16	Kundiawa Warriors	
23 June 1991	Port Moresby Vipers	40–28	Mt Hagen Eagles	Rabiamul Oval
23 June 1991	Mendi Muruks	34–8	Goroka Lahanis	

=== Round 7 ===
Date	Home	Score	Away	Venue
30 June 1991	Port Moresby Vipers	32–18	Lae City Bombers	Lloyd Robson Oval
30 June 1991	Mt Hagen Eagles	36–16	Goroka Lahanis	
30 June 1991	Kundiawa Warriors	44–21	Mendi Muruks	

=== Round 8 ===
Date	Home	Score	Away	Venue
14 July 1991	Mendi Muruks	2–18	Lae City Bombers	
14 July 1991	Port Moresby Vipers	36–11	Goroka Lahanis	Lloyd Robson Oval
14 July 1991	Mt Hagen Eagles	18–2	Kundiawa Warriors	

=== Round 9 ===
Date	Home	Score	Away	Venue
21 July 1991	Kundiawa Warriors	21–20	Port Moresby Vipers	Kundiawa
21 July 1991	Mendi Muruks		Mt Hagen Eagles	
21 July 1991	Lae City Bombers		Goroka Lahanis	

=== Round 10 ===
Date	Home	Score	Away	Venue
28 July 1991	Mt Hagen Eagles		Lae City Bombers	
28 July 1991	Port Moresby Vipers		Mendi Muruks	Lloyd Robson Oval
28 July 1991	Goroka Lahanis	10–10	Kundiawa Warriors	Goroka

Supporters of the Kundiawa Warriors began fighting at Goroka after the drawn match. More than a hundred of them later damaged a supermarket in Kundiawa town belonging to Collins and Leahy, the Goroka club's sponsor, after the company declined to help them travel home.

== Ladder ==
No table for the completed regular season has been found. The latest published standings are those after round 7:

Pos	Team	Pld	W	D	L	PF	PA	Pts
1	Port Moresby Vipers	7	6	0	1	198	141	12
2	Mt Hagen Eagles	7	4	1	2	164	151	9
3	Kundiawa Warriors	7	3	0	4	144	135	6
4	Goroka Lahanis	7	3	0	4	165	205	6

== Finals ==
=== Preliminary final ===
The Mt Hagen Eagles beat the Kundiawa Warriors 22–4 on 4 August 1991 to reach the grand final.

=== Grand final ===
The grand final was played at Lloyd Robson Oval in Port Moresby on 11 August 1991. The Port Moresby Vipers and the Mt Hagen Eagles drew 18–18 after extra time, and the Vipers took the premiership on tries scored. The winners received K9,000 in prize money.
