= 1990 SP Inter City Cup season =

Papua New Guinea rugby league season

1990 SP Inter-City Cup season
- League: Papua New Guinea National Rugby League

1990 season
- Premiers: Port Moresby Vipers
- Runners-up: Mt Hagen Eagles

The 1990 SP Inter-City Cup season was the first season of the SP Inter-City Cup, a nationwide rugby league club competition in Papua New Guinea and the forerunner of the present Papua New Guinea National Rugby League competition. The competition was sponsored by South Pacific Brewery.

The Port Moresby Vipers won the premiership, the first of the club's titles in the competition, defeating the Wamp Nga Mt Hagen Eagles 26–6 in the grand final at Lloyd Robson Oval in Port Moresby. The side was coached by John Wagambie.

== Teams ==
The full field for the 1990 season has not been established. The Port Moresby Vipers and the Wamp Nga Mt Hagen Eagles are known to have taken part, having contested the grand final, as are the Goroka Lahanis, whom the Vipers beat during the season.

== Regular season ==
No full record of the season has been established. The Eagles beat the Vipers twice during the regular season, 15-10 and 6–4, before losing the grand final to them.
