= Wartovo Puara Jr =

Papua New Guinea international rugby league footballer

Wartovo Puara
Personal information
- Full name: Wartovo Puara Jr
- Born: 24 June 1990 (age 35) Tapipipi H/C, Tomadir LLG, Raim Village, East New Britain, Papua New Guinea
- Height: 174 cm (5 ft 9 in)
- Weight: 84 kg (13 st 3 lb)

Playing information
- Position: Hooker
Club
Years	Team	Pld	T	G	FG	P
2014–18	PNG Hunters	111	25	0	0	100
2019–20	Barrow Raiders	33	2	0	0	8
2021–22	PNG Hunters	24	2	0	0	8
	Total	168	29	0	0	116
Representative
Years	Team	Pld	T	G	FG	P
2012–22	PNG Prime Minister's XIII	4	0	0	0	0
2014–22	Papua New Guinea	6	2	0	0	8
2019	Papua New Guinea 9s	3	0	0	0	0
- Source: As of 9 November 2023
Medals
Men's rugby league nines
Representing Papua New Guinea
Pacific Games
Gold medal – first place	2015 Port Moresby	Team

Wartovo Puara Jr (born 24 June 1990) is a Papua New Guinean professional rugby league footballer who plays as a hooker for the Sepik Pride Rugby League Football Club in the PNGNRL. He previously played for the Barrow Raiders in the Championship. He has represented the Papua New Guinean national team, most notably at the 2017 World Cup.

== Early life ==
Puara was born in Kokopo, Papua New Guinea, and played his junior rugby league for the Kokopo Muruks.Most of his childhood career played in local competition under RMX Dogs team from Raim Village.

== Playing career ==
Puara joined the PNG Hunters in 2014 for their inaugural season in the Queensland Cup. He trained with the South Sydney Rabbitohs on a six week trial contract during the 2015 pre-season. Puara represented PNG in rugby league nines at the 2015 Pacific Games, scoring 2 tries in the grand final and being named Player of the Tournament.

In 2019 Puara signed for the Barrow Raiders he enjoyed a great first season and was tipped by Barrie McDermott as one of 6 potential championship players that could play in super league. His form earned him a place in the PNG international side that took on Great Britain and won. In 2020 Puara signed a two-year contract extension with the Raiders.

International caps
Cap	Date	Venue	Opponent	Competition	T	G	FG	Points
1	19 October 2014	Lae Oval, Lae	Tonga		1	0	0	4
2	2 May 2015	Robina Stadium, Gold Coast	Fiji		0	0	0	0
3	7 May 2016	Parramatta Stadium, Sydney	Fiji		0	0	0	0
4	6 May 2017	Leichhardt Oval, Sydney	Cook Islands		1	0	0	4
5	28 October 2017	PNG Football Stadium, Port Moresby	Wales	2017 World Cup	0	0	0	0
