= Okul =

Okul may refer to:

- Okul (film), a 2004 Turkish horror-comedy film
- John Okul, Papua New Guinean rugby league player
- Pi Capricorni, a star in the constellation Capricorn
