= Augustine Justine =

PNG international rugby league footballer

Personal information
- Born: Papua New Guinea

Playing information
- Position: Fullback
Representative
Years	Team	Pld	T	G	FG	P
2000	Papua New Guinea	1	0	0	0	0

Augustine Justine is a Papua New Guinean rugby league footballer who represented Papua New Guinea national rugby league team in the 2000 World Cup.

Justine played for the Lae Bombers in the SP Cup.
