= Lae Bombers =

Club information
- Full name: Lae LBC Bombers Rugby Football Club
- Colours: Green, Yellow and Red
- Founded: 1990

Current details
- Ground: Lae Rugby League Oval, Morobe Province
- Competition: PNGNRL

Records
- Premierships: 2 (1995, 2002)
- Runners-up: 2 (1997, 2003)

The Lae Bombers (from 2006 onwards they were known as the Lae LBC Bombers for sponsorship reasons) was a rugby league team that represented the Morobe Province in the PNG NRL competition. They were involved in the competition from 1990 until 2012. They played their home-ground matches in the city of Lae, the second largest city in Papua New Guinea.

== History ==
Since the inception of the SP Cup Competition in 1990, the LBC Lae Bombers have been one of the most consistent and competitive teams to participate in the competition. The Bombers had LBC - Lae Builders and Contractors as their major sponsor since 1990, making the partnership the longest in the game's history.

== Notable players ==
Lae players to have represented Papua New Guinea include Makali Aizue, Augustine Justine, John Okul and Titus Maima.

== See also ==
- Rugby league in Papua New Guinea
