= Papua New Guinea National Rugby League =

Rugby league competition

PNGNRL Digicel-ExxonMobil Cup
- Current season or competition: 2026 PNGNRL season
- Sport: Rugby league
- Formerly known as: SP Inter-City Cup (1990–2008); Bemobile Cup (2009–10); Digicel Cup (2011–2022)
- Instituted: 1990
- Inaugural season: 1990 (as SP Inter-City Cup)
- Holders: Rabaul Gurias (2026)
- Most titles: Rabaul Gurias (7 titles)

The Papua New Guinea National Rugby League Competition (or the PNGNRL for short, for sponsorship reasons the PNGNRL Digicel-ExxonMobil Cup) is a semi-professional rugby league competition held annually in Papua New Guinea. Changes in sponsorship have meant that it was formerly known as the SP Inter-City Cup or SP Cup (1990–2008) and later the Bemobile Cup (2009–2010). The current competition is sponsored by pacific telecommunications giant Digicel and new co-naming rights sponsor ExxonMobil (one of the world's largest publicly traded oil and gas companies) which joined in 2023 and so it is currently called the Digicel-ExxonMobil Cup.

== History ==
Previous to 2005 the PNG NRL was called the SP Inter-City Cup. The national competition was known as the SP Cup, and has been held since 1990. No national club competition was held in 2004. The PNGRFL instead staged a national zone championship, won by Southern Zone, who beat Highlands Zone 22–4 in the final at Lae to take the SP Shield and K4,000 in prize money. The development plan the PNGRFL published that month set the start of a new national competition for April 2005. The competition returned for the 2005 season as the new-look PNGNRL.

The 2005 season had eight teams in total from all around Papua New Guinea. In 2006, one team was relegated (Monier Broncos) to make way for two new teams, Central Raiders and Pagini Warriors. The winner of the relaunched competition in 2005 was the Agmark Gurias, who beat the Brian Bell Bulldogs in Port Moresby.

In 2009, the local mobile telecommunications company Bemobile took over from SP Brewery as the competition's major sponsor. Nine teams competed at that time.

Logo 2011–2022

On February 9, 2011, telecommucations company Digicel who has taken over the industry in PNG since its operation started in 2007, announced that it will be sponsoring PNG's premier sporting event for the next five years.

== Sponsorship Names ==
- SP Inter-City Cup – (1990–2008)
- Bemobile Cup – (2009–10)
- Digicel Cup – (2011–2022)
- Digicel-ExxonMobil Cup – (2023–present)

== Teams ==
Principal areas represented by 2025 Digicel Cup teams

2025 Digicel Cup Teams
Team	Stadium	City/Area
Central Dabaris	Oil Search National Football Stadium	Port Moresby, National Capital District
Enga Mioks	Johnson Siki Aipus	Wabag, Enga Province
Goroka Lahanis	National Sports Institute	Goroka, Eastern Highlands Province
Gulf Isou	Oil Search National Football Stadium	Kerema, Gulf Province
Hela Wigmen	Oil Search National Football Stadium	Tari Hela Province
Kimbe Cutters	Muthuvel Stadium	Kimbe, West New Britain Province
Lae Snax Tigers	Lae League Oval	Lae, Morobe Province
Mendi Muruks	Joseph Keviame Oval	Mendi, Southern Highlands Province
Mt. Hagen Eagles	Rebiamul Oval	Mt. Hagen, Western Highlands Province
Port Moresby Vipers	Oil Search National Football Stadium	Port Moresby, National Capital District
Rabaul Gurias	Kalabond Oval	Kokopo, East New Britain Province
Waghi Tumbe	Minj Oval	Minj, Jiwaka Province

== History of Premiers ==
Year	Premiers	Runners Up	Score	Attendance
1990	Port Moresby Vipers	Mt Hagen Eagles	26–6	9,230
1991	Port Moresby Vipers	Mt Hagen Eagles	18–18 (Note: Vipers win by virtue of scoring more tries)	8,900
1992	Port Moresby Vipers	Mt Hagen Eagles	36–0	12,112
1993	Goroka Lahanis	Port Moresby Vipers	22–10	8,291
1994	Port Moresby Vipers	Goroka Lahanis	36–30	8,011
1995	Lae Bombers	Mendi Muruks	28–18	10,232
1996	Mendi Muruks	Kundiawa Warriors	11–10	12,312
1997	Mt Hagen Eagles	Lae Bombers	19–16	10,271
1998	Mt Hagen Eagles	Mendi Muruks	14–6	9,278
1999	Goroka Lahanis	Rabaul Gurias	24–0	10,812
2000	Enga Mioks	Rabaul Gurias	36–20	14,123
2001	Rabaul Gurias	Goroka Lahanis	18–2	10,912
2002	Lae Bombers	Rabaul Gurias	14–12	12,321
2003	Rabaul Gurias	Lae Bombers	17–16	12,381
2004 (Note: Competition not held that year)	Mendi Menjals	Popondetta Butterflies	22–0	12,322
2005	Rabaul Gurias	Port Moresby Bulldogs	14–13	10,249
2006	Mendi Muruks	Goroka Lahanis	19–14	12,021
2007	Mendi Muruks	Rabaul Gurias	42–6	11,000+
2008	Mendi Muruks	Mt Hagen Eagles	14–4	12,000+
2009	Rabaul Gurias	Enga Mioks	24–14	15,000+
2010	Goroka Lahanis	Mendi Muruks	21–10	20,000+
2011	Goroka Lahanis	Rabaul Gurias	20–10	20,000+
2012	Rabaul Gurias	Mendi Muruks	14–10	20,000+
2013	Port Moresby Vipers	Goroka Lahanis	36–14	20,000+
2014	Hela Wigmen	Agmark Gurias	34–8	
2015	Rabaul Gurias	TNA Simbu Lions	26–18	20,000+
2016	Lae Snax Tigers	Rabaul Gurias	14–8	20,000+
2017	Lae Snax Tigers	Rabaul Gurias	11–10	20,000+
2018	Goroka Lahanis	Enga Mioks	10–6	20,000+
2019	Lae Snax Tigers	Hela Wigmen	15–4	20,000+
2020	Hela Wigmen	Lae Snax Tigers	16–14	
2021	Lae Snax Tigers	Waghi Tumbe	16–10	
2022	Hela Wigmen	Rabaul Gurias	8–6	
2023	Enga Mioks	Goroka Lahanis	26–6	
2024	Mt Hagen Eagles	Hela Wigmen	28–20	13,900
2025	Lae Snax Tigers	Mendi Muruks	36–16	
2026	Rabaul Gurias	Mendi Muruks	26–14	14,000+

== Performance by team ==
Team	Win	Runners Up	Winning years	Runners Up years
Rabaul Gurias	7	8	2001, 2003, 2005, 2009, 2012, 2015, 2026	1999, 2000, 2002, 2007, 2011, 2016, 2017, 2022
Goroka Lahanis	5	6	1993, 1999, 2010, 2011, 2018	1994, 2001, 2005, 2006, 2013, 2023
Port Moresby Vipers	5	2	1990, 1991, 1992, 1994, 2013	1993, 2005 (as Port Moresby Bulldogs)
Lae Snax Tigers	5	1	2016, 2017, 2019, 2021, 2025	2020
Mendi Muruks	4	6	1996, 2006, 2007, 2008	1995, 1998, 2010, 2012, 2025, 2026
Mt Hagen Eagles	3	4	1997, 1998, 2024	1990, 1991, 1992, 2008
Hela Wigmen	3	2	2014, 2020, 2022	2019, 2024
Lae Bombers	2	2	1995, 2002	1997, 2003
Enga Mioks	2	2	2000, 2023	2009, 2018
Waghi Tumbe	0	1		2021
TNA Simbu Lions	0	1		2015
Kundiawa Warriors	0	1		1996

== See also ==
- Papua New Guinea Rugby Football League
