= Sepik Pride Rugby League Football Club =

PNG semi-professional rugby leam club from Wewak

Sepik Pride
Club information
- Founded: 2020

Current details
- Competition: PNG NRL

The EMK Sepik Pride are a semi-professional Papua New Guinean rugby league team from Wewak, East Sepik Province. They will be competing in the Papua New Guinea National Rugby League Competition and their maiden season will be in 2023. They will be playing their home games in Wewak. The Franchise is owned by EMK Constructions Ltd and was founded in 2018.

== 2023 squad ==
Sepik Pride RLFC
First team squad			Coaching staff
Roy Ellison – FB; Lipirin Sakias – WG; Elizah Iwa – CE; Joe Frank – CE; John Paul – WG; Peter Pakali – SO; Wartovo Puara – HB, HK (c); Francis Kembis – PR; Gerson Parai – HK; Francis Takai – PR; Isaac Patrick – SR, LK (vc); Baddy Jack – SR; Jack Alu – LK	Micheal Ragi – HK; Daniel Lipu – SO; Micah Tom – FB, WG; Muka Peter Kalu – PR; Aaron Boli – PR; – PR; Adel Mikaiwe – CE; Jason Giluwe – SR; Jonathan Aisa – WG; Gillespie David – PR, LK; Bensley Tikele – SR; Ian James – HK; Rudolf Patuo – PR	Dickson Amea – WG, CE; Mark Kawage – CE, FB; Jeremy Pima – SR; Memehere Lari – SR	Head coach: Joe Bruno; Legend: (c) Captain(s); (vc) Vice-captain(s); Updated: 13 February 2023; Source(s):

== See also ==
- Rugby league in Papua New Guinea
