= John Okul =

PNG international rugby league footballer

Personal information
- Full name: John Okul
- Born: 24 November 1972 (age 53) Lae, Papua New Guinea
- Height: 5 ft 7 in (1.70 m)
- Weight: 15 st 7 lb (98 kg)

Playing information
- Position: Fullback, Wing, Centre
Club
Years	Team	Pld	T	G	FG	P
1991–94	Lae Bombers
1995–96	Canterbury-Bankstown
1996–98	Hull Kingston Rovers
1998–00	Doncaster Dragons
2000–01	Barrow Border Raiders
	Total	0	0	0	0	0
Representative
Years	Team	Pld	T	G	FG	P
1991	Highlands Zone	1	0	0	0	0
1994–95	Papua New Guinea	4	1	0	0	4

John Okul (born 24 November 1972) is a Papua New Guinean rugby league footballer who represented Papua New Guinea at the 1995 World Cup.

== Playing career ==
Okul played for the Lae club in Papua New Guinea and represented the Highlands Zone in 1991 against Australia. He was first selected for Papua New Guinea in 1994 and played in another three test matches, including two at the 1995 World Cup.

Following the tournament he was signed by Hull Kingston Rovers, along with teammate Stanley Gene. He played for PNG at the 1997 Super League World Nines. After his Hull KR career was hampered by injury, Okul had stints with the Doncaster Dragons, and the Barrow Border Raiders. In 2002 and 2003 he played for West Hull in the BARLA National Conference League’s Premier Division.
