= Kalabond Oval =

Sports venue in Kokopo, Papua New Guinea

- Interactive map of Kalabond Oval
- Location: Kokopo, East New Britain Province, Papua New Guinea
- Coordinates: 4°20′47″S 152°17′7″E
- Capacity: 7,000
- Surface: Grass

Tenants
- Papua New Guinea Kumuls; Agmark Gurias; PNG Hunters (2014–2015)

Kalabond Oval is a sporting oval in Kokopo, East New Britain Province, Papua New Guinea. It is home to rugby league team Agmark Gurias and has a capacity of 7,000 spectators. The stadium sits on the foot of an active volcano, Tavurvur.

== History ==
In 2013, the stadium played host to the PNG vs Australia PM's XIII. The stadium was home to the PNG Hunters in the Queensland Cup for the 2014 and 2015 seasons before they relocated to the National Football Stadium. In October 2014, the stadium hosted the OFC Women's Nations Cup.
