= Vitis Central Dabaris =

Central Dabaris

Club information
- Colours: Blue and Red

Current details
- Ground(s): Oil Search National Football Stadium
- Competition: PNG NRL

Central Dabaris is a semi-professional rugby league club that will be competing in its 3rd season in the 2021 Papua New Guinea National Rugby League season.

== 2022 squad ==
Central Dabaris
First team squad			Coaching staff
Josh Erico – FB; Tekila Kini – WG; Andrew Solo – CE; Papa Otto – CE; Aigaewa Palo – WG; Nicky Hasu – SO; Sebastian Gaudi – HB; Adam Korave – PR (c); Ross Ravu – HK; Muka Kalu – PR; Kosman Rahe – SR; Moses Okopela – SR; Buli Henao – LK	Dobbie Micheal – HK; Heniga Lapanda – SR (c); Gerry Ware – PR; Wallen Tau-Loi – SR; Morea Morea Jnr – WG; Troy Taumu – PR; Dikana Arere – HB; Lohia Arua – PR; Joash Toringi – HK; Alwyn Kewaru – PR; Steven Tai – SR; Geti Raka – SR; Heni Rava – LK	Gigila Maitona – HK; Peter Dagi – SR; Clinton Tube – PR	Head coach: Gairo Pepena; Legend: (c) Captain(s); (vc) Vice-captain(s); Updated: 7 May 2021; Source(s):
