= Hela Wigmen =

Kroton Hela Wigmen

Club information
- Colours: Blue, Yellow, Red
- Founded: 2009

Current details
- Ground(s): PNG Football Stadium
- Competition: PNG NRL

Records
- Premierships: 3 (2014, 2020, 2022)
- Runners-up: 1 (2019)

The Kroton Hela Wigmen is a semi-professional Papua New Guinean rugby league team from Hela Province. They currently compete in the Papua New Guinea National Rugby League Competition. They have been playing their home games in Port Moresby while waiting for their new stadium to be completed in 2022, the new stadium will be based in Tari, the capital of Hela Province.

In 2014, they won the Digicel Cup, beating the Rabaul Gurias 34-8 in the grand final in Lae. They won their second premiership title in 2020 defeating Lae Snax Tigers 14-6 in the grand final in POM. They won their third premiership title in 2022 defeating Rabaul Gurias 8-6 in the grand final in POM.

In 2023, the Kroton Hela Wigmen ensured that the Melanesian Club Championship remained in Papua New Guinea following a 28 – 18 win over the Western State Maroons in Lautoka, Fiji.

== 2022 squad ==
Kroton Hela Wigmen
First team squad			Coaching staff
Junior Bobby – FB; Nanduka Rame – WG; Stanford Talita – CE; Tony Wemin – CE; Bob Nale – WG; Eddie Timuku – SO; Allan Simbiri – HB; Tommy Moide – PR; Patrick Morea – HK; Valentine Culligan – PR (c); Daniel Pai – SR; Junior Igila – SR; Philemon Taime – LK	Willie Wala – HK; Darius Balupa – PR; Junior Hoki – SR, CE; Siki Konden – SR, CE; Roger David – LK; Peter Pakali – FB; Ian James – SR; Bernard Lai – HB; Atua Joshua – WG; Kennedy Telege – CE, FB; Manu Kame – PR, LK; Jordan Steven – CE; Cliff Denge – HK	Lape Peape – SO; Peter Jeffrey – PR; Alois Topai – SR, CE; Jack Alu – CE; Messach Wallen – LK; Gori Akuni – FB; Ham Tina – SR; Kobu Piju – HB	Head coach: Charlie Wabo; Legend: (c) Captain(s); (vc) Vice-captain(s); Updated: 06 May 2021; Source(s):

== Honours ==
=== League ===
- PNGNRL Digicel Cup

Winners (3): 2014, 2020, 2022,
Runners up (1): 2019,
