= Kimbe Cutters =

Rugby league club from West New Britain

Current details
- Competition: PNG NRL

Kimbe Cutters is a semi-professional rugby league club from West New Britain province of Papua New Guinea that last participated in the 2025 season. That was its 6th season in the Papua New Guinea National Rugby League Competition.

== 2022 squad ==
Kimbe Cutters
First team squad		Coaching staff
Clarence Clincy – FB; Christy Gorea – WG; Elijah Rotinga – CE; Anthony Longa – CE; John Ongol – WG; Jah Hogan – SO; Josiah Jimmy – HB; John Dau – PR; Tony Ponda – HK; Ismael Waine – PR (c); Alex Rova – SR; Steven Yei – SR; Fredrick Ramangio – LK	Sydney Koi – HB; Raymond Douglas – PR; Tony Worot – PR; Alvin Kapin Jnr – SR; Johnson Simon – LK; Jacob Levi – FB; Allan Kautu – WG; Tiger Emere – SR; Donald Waluka – WG; Jacob Levi Bakani – SO; Dickson Morrison – LK; Willington Makoni – CE; Walter Solomale – HK	Head coach: Lukas Samak; Legend: (c) Captain(s); (vc) Vice-captain(s); Updated: 7 May 2021; Source(s):
