= Waghi Tumbe =

Wagi Tumbe

Current details
- Competition: PNG NRL

Waghi Tumbe is a semi-professional rugby league club based in Minj, Jiwaka Province of Papua New Guinea. They competed in the Digicel Cup, Papua New Guinea's semi-professional rugby league competition. the team first entered the SP cup now known as Digicel cup in the 2000s. They were dropped from the league in 2023 for failing to comply with the PNG RFL's strategic plan.

== 2022 squad ==
Waghi Tumbe
First team squad			Coaching staff
Francis Sam – FB; Valentine Wamdi – WG; Wawa Paul – CE; Joe Frank – CE (c); Garry Lo – WG; Saki Peter – SO; David Joseph – HB; Francis Kembis – PR; Goi Sakipo – HK; Supa Kokote – PR (vc); Dominic Minji – SR; Micah Tom – SR; Keith Joe – LK	Job Kar – HK; Mathew Jesse – HK; Tony Paki – SR, CE; Nelson Kumba – CE; Koso Bandi – WG; Daniel Toli – SO; Jojo Bill – SR; Joe Kit – HB; Tony Paki – WG; Daniel Paii – CE, FB; Robert Koronus – PR, LK; Josiah Apua – CE; Philly Tembon – HK	Mathew Salika – SO; Paul Koi – PR; Robin Takpe – SR, CE; Jeremiah Taii – WG; Manase Kaii – FB	Head coach: Baundo Aba; Legend: (c) Captain(s); (vc) Vice-captain(s); Updated: 7 May 2021; Source(s):
