= Gulf Isou =

Rugby club in Papua New Guinea

Current details
- Competition: PNG NRL

Gulf Isou Rugby League Club is a semi-professional rugby league club from the Gulf Province of Papua New Guinea. They made their debut in the 2018 season of the Papua New Guinea National Rugby League competition. Their sponsors include Petroleum Resources Kutubu and Mayur Resources.

== 2022 squad ==
PRK Gulf Isou Rugby League Club
First team squad			Coaching staff
John Stanley – FB; Ben Wemin – WG; Eliakim Lukara – CE; Chris Jerry – CE; Frank Tole – WG; Karis Peter – SO; David Joseph – HB; Dilbert Isaac – PR; Jerry Teme – HK; Fedro Gene – PR; Ade Kawa – SR; Aaron Kamba – SR; – LK	Presley Soto – HK; Benjamin Timothy – SR; Peter Mondo – PR; Rex Tandowa – CE; Benjamin Yaki – CE; Brendon Bigam – SO; – CE; Brian Gispe – HK; Joel Gena – WG; Iru Dikana – CE, FB; Junior Mel – LK; Philip Komboi – CE; Bob Gore – HK	Abel Rami – SO	Head coach: Roger Laka; Legend: (c) Captain(s); (vc) Vice-captain(s); Updated: 31 May 2022; Source(s):
