= Rabaul Gurias =

PNG semi-professional rugby leam club from Kokopo

Club information
- Founded: 1991

Current details
- Ground: Kalabond Oval
- Coach: Francis Ray
- Captain: Ase Boas
- Competition: PNG NRL

Records
- Premierships: 6 (2001, 2003, 2005, 2009, 2012, 2015)
- Runners-up: 8 (1999, 2000, 2002, 2007, 2011, 2016, 2017, 2022)

The Agmark Rabaul Gurias are a Papua New Guinean rugby league team from Kokopo, East New Britain Province. They currently compete in the Papua New Guinea National Rugby League. They play their home games at Kalabond Oval at the foot of active volcano Tavurvur. The Franchise is owned by NGIP Agmark Limited and was founded in 1991. The team has won six premierships, in 2001, 2003, 2005, 2009, 2012 and 2015. The has developed professional rugby players who have played for the PNG Hunters, like Israel Eliab, Ase Boas, Watson Boas, Wartovo Puara Jr, Lucas Solbat, Michael Marum, Normyle Eremas and Menzie Yere.

== 2022 squad ==
Agmark Rabaul Gurias
First team squad			Coaching staff
Junias Guan – FB; Donald Waluka – WG; Levai Andrew – CE; William Tirang – CE; Chris Benjamin – WG; Wesley Batari – SO; Karis Peter – HB; Jordan Pat – PR; Nathan Tente – HK; Daniel Pai – PR; Nickson Waki – SR, LK; Pasala Kolo – SR; Alex Max – LK	Mark Alunga – HB; Steven Bruno – FB, WG; Casey Dickson – SR; Lance Mutu – LK; Simon Johnson – PR; Dickson Pipi – FB; Paul Nelson – SR; Tuvi Lepan – SR; Emmanuel Herea – WG; Jacob Lot – PR, LK; John Ragi Jnr – CE; Reagan Naipao – HK; Myles Banam – WG	Elias Selu – HB; Konnie Bernard – CE, FB; Nelson Aufi – SR; Ase Boas – SO (c)	Head coach: Francis Ray; Legend: (c) Captain(s); (vc) Vice-captain(s); Updated: 24 May 2022; Source(s):

== See also ==
- F.C. Morobe Wawens
