= Enga Mioks =

PNG semi-professional rugby league team based in Enga Province

Club information
- Colours: White, Green and Yellow
- Founded: 1992; 33 years ago

Current details
- Ground(s): Johnson Siki Aipus Oval, Wabag
- Competition: PNG NRL

Records
- Premierships: 2 (2000, 2023)
- Runners-up: 2 (2009, 2018)

Enga Mioks (established 1992) is a semi-professional rugby league team based in Enga Province, Papua New Guinea. The team competes in the Papua New Guinea National Rugby League competition. They play at Johnson Siki Aipus Oval, Wabag located at 3 km outside the provincial capital Wabag.

== History ==
The team qualified for the SP Inter-city Cup in its 1998 season. In their maiden season they lost the second-last. The following season under new coaching staff and new sponsors Toyota they improved significantly coming fourth. In their third season with the smart recruiting of power-house international prop Raymond Karl the Mioks won their first minor premiership and SP Intercity Millennium Cup title in 2000. Entering the new PNGNRL competition on 2005 they had a scrappy season finishing a lonely second last. In 2006, however they improved just missing out on the finals play off by points difference. Mioks were runners up in 2009 to Rabaul Gurias losing 24-14 and again in 2018 to Goroka Lahanis losing 10-6. Mioks eventually won the Exon-Mobil Digicel Cup in 2023 again against Goroka Lahanis 26-6.

== 2022 squad ==
Enga Mioks
First team squad			Coaching staff
Edward Yukil – FB; Ezekiel Yaru – WG; Danny Gorea – CE; Stelwin Pebo – CE; Jay Katie – WG; Kora Lega – SO; Willie Tusa – HB; Sani Lipu – PR; Ase Gima – HK; Nathan Peter – PR; Kennedy Ben – SR; Newman Kunjil – SR; Bernard Goma – LK	Simon Yama – HK; Junior Talin – SR; Mcwin Gabriel – PR; Luwi David – SR; Caleb Lo – WG; Cedric Pora – SO; Joe Honk – HB; Linchil Kiap – PR; Nicky Aure – HK; Kot Kerowa – PR; Alex Max – SR; Seal Kalo – SR; Tiger Emere – LK	Tapia Solu – HK; Chris Owen Wallace – SR; Jeremiah Upiap – PR; Yves David – SR; Slyder Bulu – WG; Agiru John Ako – SO; Steve Bill – HB; Manu Mikave – PR; Junior Thomas – HK	Head coach: Andiki Andrew; Legend: (c) Captain(s); (vc) Vice-captain(s); Updated: 07 May 2021; Source(s):

== Honours ==
- Cambridge Cup Club Champions: 1995, 1996, 1997
- SP Cup/Bemobile Cup/PNGNRL:
  - Champions (2): 2000, 2023
  - Runner-Up (2): 2009, 2018
  - Finishes in top 5 every season
