= Mendi Muruks =

Papua New Guinea semi-professional rugby league football club

Current details
- Ground: Lae Rugby League Grounds
- Competition: PNG NRL

Records
- Premierships: 4 (1996, 2006, 2007, 2008)
- Runners-up: 4 (1995, 1998, 2010, 2012)

Mendi Muruks are a Papua New Guinea semi-professional rugby league football club representing Mendi in the Southern Highlands Province of Papua New Guinea. The club's logo features a "muruk", or cassowary. Although originally from Mendi in the Southern Highlands of Papua New Guinea, the team is currently based in Lae due to the current franchise owners. SBS (Structural Building Systems). They have held the Intercity premiership for 4 years in which the first Premiership win was in 1996 and then 10 years later they held the Cup for 3 years from 2006, 2007 and 2008.

== 2022 squad ==
PRK Mendi Muruks
First team squad			Coaching staff
Dickson Pipi – FB; Leon Undupia – WG (c); Levai Andrew – CE; Clent Lama – CE; Bob Tenza – WG; Charlie Simon – SO (c); Wesley Batari – HB; Ishmael Waine – PR; Jerry Joe – HK; Casey Dickson – PR; John Kerepa – SR; Nelson Yei – SR; Ishmael Balkawa – LK	Yves David – HK; Joejoe Walames – SR; Benjaiah Miti – PR; Nickson Waki – SR; Yawe Dikala – WG; Wel Koi – SO; Joe Honk – HB; Nicky Auret – PR; Norman William – HK; Timon Yamine – PR; Daniel Mark – SR; Soma Irale – SR; Kepo John – LK	Immanuel David – HK; Michael George – SR; Sam Ngend – PR; Netel Melenge – SR; Nickson Wak – WG; Joshua Nane – CE; Sylvester Bulu – HB; Abraham Wallace – PR	Head coach: Roderick Puname; Legend: (c) Captain(s); (vc) Vice-captain(s); Updated: 5 July 2022; Source(s):

== Honours ==
=== League ===
- PNGNRL Digicel Cup

Winners (4): 1996, 2006, 2007, 2008,
Runners up (4): 1995, 1998, 2010, 2012,2025
