= Port Moresby Vipers =

PNG rugby league club

Club information
- Founded: 1986; 40 years ago

Current details
- Ground: PNG Football Stadium
- Competition: PNG NRL

Records
- Premierships: 5 (1990, 1991, 1992, 1994, 2013)
- Runners-up: 2 (1993, 2005 (as Port Moresby Bulldogs))

The Port Moresby Vipers (formerly the Port Moresby Bulldogs) are a Papua New Guinean rugby league team from Port Moresby. The team currently competes in the Papua New Guinea National Rugby League Competition and is bidding to join the NSW Cup competition in Australia pending approval from the PNGRFL.

== History ==
The club competed in the Panasonic Cup in 1986, 1987, 1988 and 1989. In 1990, they joined the new competition SP Cup where they won 3 premierships, up until 1995. They joined the Queensland Cup competition in 1996 and 1997. Due to the cost of transportation to and from Australia they were not invited to compete in the Queensland Cup for 1998. They returned to the SP Cup in 1999 for one season, before being demoted to the Port Moresby Rugby Football League Competition. Another franchise Club that represented Port Moresby in the semi-professional competition was the Port Moresby Brian Bell Bulldogs.

Richard Sinamoi, William Bussil Junior, Paul Komboi, and POMRFL Chairman Solomon Ravu orchestrated the re-entry of the Vipers in the national competition, during the SP Cup transition period to Bemobile Cup in 2008. The Vipers ended with the wooden spoon in its maiden year returning to the high level national competition, but finished strongly in the following seasons (7th in 2009, and 5th in 2010). When Digicel took the naming rights of the national competition, the Vipers finished 5th in 2011, and 4th in 2012. The team eventually became premiers, winning the cup in 2013.

The club is a national and flagship identity in the metropolitan city of Port Moresby and its players are from a mixture of all provinces in the country. The club's feeder league is the Port Moresby Rugby League competition.

== New South Wales Cup Bid ==
The Port Moresby Vipers have launched their bid to join the Knock-On Effect NSW Cup competition in Australia. They have an Academy with the major focus on Women's and Juniors. The rugby league nursery in Port Moresby is the biggest in Papua New Guinea, supplying players to all PNG Digicel Cup teams and will be the backbone of the Vipers bid for the NSW Cup.

== Pathways Partnership with Hull KR ==
On April 12, 2024 the Vipers signed a Pathways Partnership with Hull KR which will see two Vipers Academy 16 year old players join the Rovers Under-18 Academy team. They will live with PNG Kumuls legend John Okul in Hull and participate in the academy programs for two years and hope to join the senior Hull KR team. Junior Kaeaka was the first Vipers academy player to join Hull KR Academy on a two year academy contract in 2025 and 2026.

== 2025 squad ==
Moni Plus NCDC Port Moresby Vipers
First team squad			Coaching staff
Jnr Vick Kevau – FB, CE; Benjamin Yeki – WG; Gilmo Paul – CE, FB; Leon Undupia – CE, WG; – WG, FB, CE; Joel Gena – SO; Nicky Hasu – HB; Fedro Gene – PR (c); Supa George – HK; Stanton Albert – PR; Bob Gore – SR; Jimmy Gissua – SR; Benjamin Timothy – LK	Maya Clark – HK; Philip Komboi – SR; Julius Yakopa – SR; Charles Sul – CE; Weiyah Koi – CE; Jarran Pitten – WG; Abel Rami – WG; Junior Mel – CE; Simon Arana – PR; Milex Winis – CE, FB; – LK; Frank Tole – WG; Peter Mondo – SR	Philemon Kimisive – SO; Aaron Kamba – SR; Mesno Laki – PR; Max Tonia – HK	Head coach: Joe Sipa; Legend: (c) Captain(s); (vc) Vice-captain(s); Updated: 6 June 2022; Source(s):

== Results ==
=== SP Cup/Bemobile Cup/PNGNRL ===
- Winners (5): 1990, 1991, 1992, 1994, 2013
- Runners up (1): 1993,

=== Intercity Cup since 1990 ===
- 1990 Premiers Runner up Hagen Eagles
- 1991 Premiers Runner up Hagen Eagles
- 1992 Premiers Runner up My Hagen Eagles
- 1993 Runners up to Goroka Lahanis
- 1994 Premiers Runner up Goroka Lahanis.
- 2013 Premiers Runner up Goroka Lahanis

**** 1996 Foundation Club Queensland (Channel 9 cup now Intrust Super Cup)

*" Some Original Coaches and Players

1990 Sam Kaia ( Coach)

1991 John Wagambie ( Coach)

1992 John Wagambie ( Coach)

1993 Adrian Genolagani

1994 Adrian Genolagani

- Some Original players
- Johnson Tia
- John Oeka
- Kes Paglipari
- Tuksy Karu
- Sauna Babaga
- John Oeka
- Richard Wagambie
- Joe Gispe
- James Naipao
- Kera Ngaffin
- Luke Waldiat
- Wata Sauna
