= Lae Snax Tigers =

Rugby league club in Lae, Papua New Guinea

Club information
- Colours: Orange and Black
- Founded: 2011

Current details
- Competition: PNG NRL

Records
- Premierships: 5 (2016, 2017, 2019, 2021, 2025)
- Runners-up: 1 (2020)

Lae Snax Tigers is a rugby league club based in Lae, Papua New Guinea. The club was established in 2011

Lae Snax Tigers competes in Papua New Guinea Semi Professional rugby league competition called the Digicel Cup (PNG NRL). The team has captured the prestigious championship title a total of four times over its short history of being involved since 2013, making the Tigers the fastest rising rugby league club in PNG sports.

They have also competed in the Melanesian Cup match, a traditional match up between the Semi Professional champions from both PNG and Fiji respective competitions. Lae Snax Tigers making three appearances and claiming the Melanesian Cup trophy from all three matches.

== 2023 squad ==
Lae Snax Tigers
| First team squad | | Coaching staff |
|---|---|---|
| Douglas David – FB; Joshua Lau – WG, CE; Robert Mathias – CE; Emil Benjamin – CE; Benjamin Boas – WG, CE; Mark Tony – SO; Charlie Simon – HB; Doa Tapako – PR; Warren Glare – HK; Cedric Maima – PR; Nicky Aure – SR; Jarred Baruma – SR; Wendell Kipsy – LK | Finley Glare – HK; Steven Yei – PR; Steven Kela – PR; Solomon Karish – SR; Lynol Molpoyo – positions; Warex Nick – SO; Shallom Bire – CE; Sanny Wabo – FB; Jordan Steven – HK; Simon Arana – HB; – SR; – SR | Head coach: Noel Zeming; Legend: (c) Captain(s); (vc) Vice-captain(s); Updated: 25 May 2023; Source(s): |

== Honours ==
=== League ===
- PNGNRL Digicel Cup

Winners (4): 2016, 2017, 2019, 2021,
Runners up (1): 2020,
