= Mt Hagen Eagles =

Current details
- Competition: PNG NRL

Records
- Premierships: 2 (1997, 1998)
- Runners-up: 4 (1990, 1991, 1992, 2008)

The Mt Hagen Eagles are a semi professional rugby league club based in Mount Hagen, Western Highlands Province of Papua New Guinea and compete in Papua New Guinea's semi professional competition, known as the Digicel Cup. They were banned for three(3) years in 2017 for inciting rugby league violence in Papua New Guinea.

== Honours ==
Mt Hagen have been premiers twice in 1997, 1998 and runners up 4 times, including losing the very first three years of the competition in 1990, 91 and 92 and once more in 2008.
