= Goroka Lahanis =

Bintangor Goroka Lahanis

Current details
- Ground(s): National Sports Institute
- Competition: PNG NRL

Records
- Premierships: 5 (1993, 1999, 2010, 2011, 2018)
- Runners-up: 4 (1994, 2001, 2006, 2013)

The Bintangor Goroka Lahanis are a semi professional Papua New Guinean rugby league team from Goroka in the Eastern Highlands Province. They currently compete in the Papua New Guinea National Rugby League Competition. Their home ground is located within the National Sports Institute.

== 2022 squad ==
Goroka Lahanis
First team squad			Coaching staff
Junior Aron – FB; Junior Gibson – WG; Warex Nick – CE; Tasi Kawage – CE; Jorren Willie – WG; Roger Kenny – SO; Robin Soga – HB; Kiagi Launa – PR; Joseph Karara – HK; Chris Urakusie – PR (c); Lanike Poi – SR; Kumani Agumagu – SR; Jacob Gibbs – LK	Jonathan Gotuno – HK; Kafu Ken – PR; Benji Kama – SR, CE; Palangat Kanini – CE; Ake Paluse – LK; Absolom Lingas – FB; Charlie Buka – SR; Dell Benjii – HB; Duncan Sapu – WG; Felix Tatsim – CE, FB; Gabriel Makam – PR, LK; Jay Tee Mell – CE; Jordan Millie – HK	Komoxy Keo – SO; Korken Abba – PR; Patrick Tarutia – SR, CE; Manu Olam – SR	Head coach: Gonzella Urakusie; Legend: (c) Captain(s); (vc) Vice-captain(s); Updated: 06 May 2021; Source(s):

== Honours ==
=== League ===
- PNGNRL Digicel Cup
  - Winners (5): 1993, 1999, 2010, 2011, 2018,
  - Runners up (4): 1994, 2001, 2006, 2013,
