= PNG Football Stadium =

Stadium in Port Moresby, Papua New Guinea

PNG Football Stadium Stadium Santos National Football Stadium
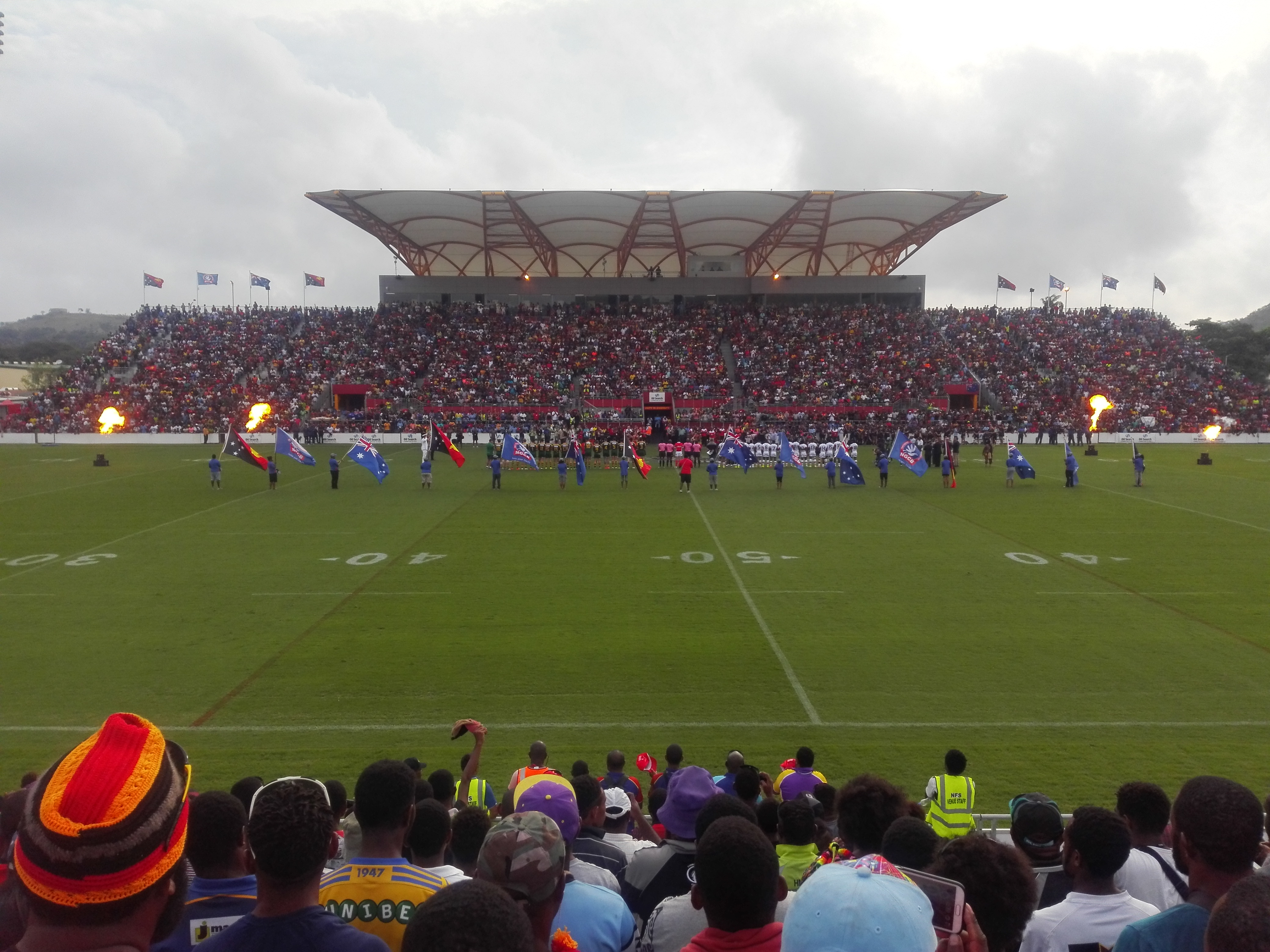
- PNG Football Stadium in 2016
- Interactive map of PNG Football Stadium Stadium; Santos National Football Stadium
- Full name: Papua New Guinea National Football Stadium
- Former names: Lloyd Robson Oval
- Location: Port Moresby, Papua New Guinea
- Coordinates: 9°28′6″S 147°11′54″E
- Capacity: 14,800
- Type: Stadium
- Surface: Grass
- Scoreboard: Yes
- Field shape: Rectangular

Construction
- Renovated: 2015
- Expanded: 2015
- Architect: Populous
- Main contractor: Populous

Tenants
- Papua New Guinea national rugby league team (1975–present); Port Moresby Vipers (PNGNRL; 1986–present); Papua New Guinea Hunters (Queensland Cup; 2016–present); PNG Hekari (OFCPL) (2026–present); Papua New Guinea Chiefs (NRL; 2028–onwards)

PNG Football Stadium, known by the sponsored name of Santos National Football Stadium and previously as Lloyd Robson Oval until 2015, is a sporting ground in Port Moresby, Papua New Guinea. It hosted three games for the 1989–1992 Rugby League World Cup. It has been the home ground for the Papua New Guinea national rugby league team since 1975. It has a total capacity of approximately 15,000 and is the National Stadium of Papua New Guinea. The stadium was completely redeveloped in preparation for the 2015 Pacific Games.

== History ==
Lloyd Robson Oval hosted its first Rugby league international on 6 July 1975 when PNG played host to England who were on their way to Australia and New Zealand for the down under leg of the 1975 World Cup. In front of an enthusiastic crowd of 12,000 England ran out 40–12 winners in what was the Kumuls international debut game.

PNG played the 1982 and 1986 Kangaroos at the oval. The Australians, unbeaten on both Kangaroo Tours, won both games 38-2 and 62-12 respectively. The 1986 game saw the Oval's record attendance when 17,000 enthusiastic fans saw the Kangaroos defeat the Kumuls.

The opening Test match of the 1988 Great Britain Lions tour was played at the Oval between Papua New Guinea and the British before a crowd of 12,107.

Lloyd Robson Oval was the primary venue of the 2009 Pacific Cup. The four round-robin matches were played at the ground on 24–25 October and 31 October, with the final played on 1 November 2009.

The oval is also home of the Port Moresby Vipers and Gulf Isou who play in the PNGNRL Digicel Cup.

Lloyd Robson is also a regular host of the annual rugby league game between the Kumuls and an Australian Prime Minister's XIII at the conclusion of the Australian-based National Rugby League season. These games are usually well attended, with 16,000 attending the game in 2012 won 24–18 by the Mal Meninga coached PM's XIII.

Soccer is also played at the Lloyd Robson Oval, with both the national men's and women's PNG teams, as well as Papua New Guinea National Soccer League playing matches at the ground, though they both generally use the Sir Hubert Murray Stadium.

At the 2016 FIFA U-20 Women's World Cup, it hosted many matches, including the final.

== Rugby league test matches ==
List of rugby league test matches played at Lloyd Robson Oval.

Date	Winner	Score	Runners-up	Competition	Attendance
6 July 1975	England	40–12	Papua New Guinea	Friendly	12,000
29 May 1977	Papua New Guinea	37–6	France	1977 France World Cup tour	14,000
30 July 1978	New Zealand	30–21	Papua New Guinea	1978 Kiwi tour	11,541
25 July 1982	New Zealand	56–5	Papua New Guinea	1982 Kiwi tour	13,000
2 October 1982	Australia	38–2	Papua New Guinea	1982 Kangaroo tour	15,000
17 August 1986	Papua New Guinea	24–22	New Zealand	1985–1988 World Cup	15,000
4 October 1986	Australia	62–12	Papua New Guinea	1985–1988 World Cup	17,000
12 July 1987	New Zealand	36–22	Papua New Guinea	1987 Kiwi tour	15,000
2 June 1990	Great Britain	40–8	Papua New Guinea	1989–1992 World Cup	7,837
11 August 1990	New Zealand	18–10	Papua New Guinea	1989–1992 World Cup	7,837
13 October 1991	Australia	40–6	Papua New Guinea	1989–1992 World Cup	14,500
31 May 1992	Great Britain	20–14	Papua New Guinea	1992 Lions tour	7,294
26 June 1994	Papua New Guinea	29–22	France	1994 France tour	5,000
27 October 1994	New Zealand	30–16	Papua New Guinea	1994 Kiwi tour	15,000
6 October 1996	Australia	52–6	Papua New Guinea	Friendly	15,000
26 July 1998	Fiji	14–10	Papua New Guinea	Friendly	Unknown
7 October 1998	Māori	23–12	Tonga	50th Anniversary Tournament	8,000
7 October 1998	Papua New Guinea	46–6	Cook Islands	50th Anniversary Tournament	8,000
11 October 1998	Cook Islands	16–8	Māori	50th Anniversary Tournament	6,000
11 October 1998	Papua New Guinea	44–28	Tonga	50th Anniversary Tournament	7,000
14 October 1998	Papua New Guinea	46–0	Māori	50th Anniversary Tournament	10,000
14 October 1998	Tonga	30–22	Cook Islands	50th Anniversary Tournament	6,000
18 October 1998	Māori	28–6	Cook Islands	50th Anniversary Tournament	Unknown
18 October 1998	Papua New Guinea	54–12	Tonga	50th Anniversary Tournament	Unknown
13 June 1999	Māori	22–18	Papua New Guinea	Friendly	5,800
16 June 1999	Māori	28–24	Papua New Guinea	Friendly	8,000
20 June 1999	Papua New Guinea	38–10	Māori	Friendly	2,700
17 June 2001	France	40–6	Papua New Guinea	2001 France tour	15,000
7 October 2001	Australia	54–12	Papua New Guinea	Friendly	14,000
24 October 2009	Cook Islands	24–22	Fiji	2009 Pacific Cup	3,269
25 October 2009	Papua New Guinea	44–14	Tonga	2009 Pacific Cup	9,813
31 October 2009	Fiji	26–16	Tonga	2009 Pacific Cup	2,000
1 November 2009	Papua New Guinea	42–14	Cook Islands	2009 Pacific Cup	10,151
28 October 2017	Papua New Guinea	50–6	Wales	2017 World Cup	14,800
5 November 2017	Papua New Guinea	14–6	Ireland	2017 World Cup	14,800
12 November 2017	Papua New Guinea	64–0	United States	2017 World Cup	14,800
3 November 2018	Papua New Guinea	32–22	England Knights	2018 Knights tour	Unknown
16 November 2019	Papua New Guinea	28–10	Great Britain	2019 Lions tour	Unknown
15 October 2023	Papua New Guinea	46–10	Cook Islands	2023 Pacific Bowl	7,133
22 October 2023	Fiji	22–18	Cook Islands	2023 Pacific Bowl	7,133
29 October 2023	Fiji	43–16	Papua New Guinea	2023 Pacific Bowl	14,546
5 November 2023	Papua New Guinea	32–12	Fiji	2023 Pacific Bowl	14,809
3 November 2024	Papua New Guinea	42–20	Cook Islands	2024 Pacific Bowl	Unknown
18 October 2025	Fiji	44–24	Cook Islands	2025 Pacific Bowl	Unknown
25 October 2025	Papua New Guinea	40–28	Cook Islands	2025 Pacific Bowl	14,864
1 November 2025	Papua New Guinea	50–18	Fiji	2025 Pacific Bowl	12,048
17 October 2026	Papua New Guinea	42–18	Lebanon	2026 World Cup	11,624
24 October 2026	Samoa	64–6	Papua New Guinea	2026 World Cup	15,008

== See also ==
- List of national stadiums
- Rugby League World Cup venues

Preceded by Olympic Stadium; Montreal	FIFA U-20 Women's World Cup; Final Venue; 2016	Succeeded by Stade de la Rabine; Vannes
