= International rugby league in 2010 =

This is a list of international rugby league matches played throughout 2010. A † denotes a recognised, but unofficial match that did not contribute to the IRL World Rankings.

== May ==
=== Anzac Test ===
7 May 2010

Australia	12 – 8	New Zealand

AAMI Park in Melbourne

== June ==
=== Samoa vs Fiji ===
1 June 2010

Samoa	4 – 24	Fiji

Apia, Samoa

=== European Bowl ===
4 June 2010

Malta	30–20	Norway
Tries: Grima, M. Attard, Bonanno, Bartlett (2); Conv: Attard (5)	(Report)	Tries: Schmidt, Borsheim (2), Mellor; Conv: Meldalen, Ytterdahi Elgheim

Victor Tedesco Stadium, Hamrun

=== England vs France ===
- 12 June 2010: England 60-6 France

=== European Shield East ===
2010-06-27

Russia	62-14	Ukraine
Tries: Gapanov (3), Fedchuk, Lysokon, Bratko, Ososkov, Churpin, Vlasyuk; Goals: Lysokon (5), Ososkov (2), Bratko	(Report)	Tries: Miroshnichenko, Lyubensky; Goals: Skorbach (3)

Vereya Stadium, Vereya, Moscow Oblast

2010-07-31

Latvia	4-54	Russia
Try: Jakušs	(Report)	Tries: Nechaev, Bulanov (3), Gaponov, Galimov (2), Ososkov, Loschilin, Nikolaev; Goals: Lisokony (6), Ososkov

Upesciems Stadium, Upesciems

2010-09-18

Ukraine	112-0	Latvia
Tries: Shevtsov (5), Lyubenskey (5), Skorbach (3), Kardakov (2), Bashevsky (2), Lobanj, Smolin, Kravchenk, Markelov; Goals: Skorbach (12), Lyubenskey (2)	(Report)

Arsenal Stadium, Kyiv

=== European Shield West ===
2010-06-27

Russia	62-14	Ukraine
Tries: Gapanov (3), Fedchuk, Lysokon, Bratko, Ososkov, Churpin, Vlasyuk; Goals: Lysokon (5), Ososkov (2), Bratko	(Report)	Tries: Miroshnichenko, Lyubensky; Goals: Skorbach (3)

Vereya Stadium, Vereya, Moscow Oblast

2010-07-31

Latvia	4-54	Russia
Try: Jakušs	(Report)	Tries: Nechaev, Bulanov (3), Gaponov, Galimov (2), Ososkov, Loschilin, Nikolaev; Goals: Lisokony (6), Ososkov

Upesciems Stadium, Upesciems

2010-09-18

Ukraine	112-0	Latvia
Tries: Shevtsov (5), Lyubenskey (5), Skorbach (3), Kardakov (2), Bashevsky (2), Lobanj, Smolin, Kravchenk, Markelov; Goals: Skorbach (12), Lyubenskey (2)	(Report)

Arsenal Stadium, Kyiv

== July ==
=== Czech Republic vs Catalonia ===
- 10 July 2010: Czech Republic 16-66 Catalonia

== September ==
=== Italy vs Lebanon ===
- 22 September 2010: Italy 8-16 Lebanon
- 25 September 2010: Italy 24-16 Lebanon

== October ==
=== Cumbria vs England ===
3 October 2010

Cumbria	18 – 18	England

Recreation Ground, Whitehaven
Attendance: 5,250
Referee: Phil Bentham

=== Wales vs Italy ===
6 October 2010
19:30

Wales	6–13	Italy
Try: Gareth Thomas; Goal: Lewis Reece (1/1)	Report	Tries: Christophe Caligari; Ben Falcone; Goals: Josh Mantellato (2/2); Field Goal: Ben Stewart

Racecourse Ground, Wrexham, Wales
Attendance: 2,971
Referee: Ben Thaler (Rugby Football League)

=== European Cup ===
==== Round 1 ====
9 October 2010

France	58–24	Ireland
Tries: Olivier Elima (4), Rémi Casty, Teddy Sadaoui, Cyril Stacul, Tony Gigot, Andrew Bentley, Jason Baitieri; Goals: Maxime Grésèque (4), Nicolas Munoz (5)	Report	Tries: John Gillam (2), Sean Hesketh, Jamie O'Callaghan, Greg McNally; Goals: Greg McNally, Liam Finn

Parc des Sports, Avignon, France
Attendance: 14,522
Referee: Phil Bentham (England)
Player of the Match: Rémi Casty

10 October 2010

Scotland	22–60	Wales
Tries: Ben Fisher (2), Andrew Henderson (2)	Report	Tries: Rhys Williams (3), Elliot Kear (3), Gareth Thomas, Mark Lennon, Lloyd White, Jacob Emmitt, Jordan James; Goals: Lee Briers (8)

Old Anniesland, Glasgow, Scotland
Attendance: 787
Referee: Thierry Alibert (France)

==== Round 2 ====
16 October 2010

France	26–12	Scotland
Tries: Frédéric Vaccari, Tony Gigot, Sébastien Martins, Mickaël Simon, Kane Bentley; Goals: T Munoz (3)	Report	Tries: Alex Szostack, Sam Barlow; Goals: T Danny Brough (2)

Stade Municipal d'Albi, Albi, France
Attendance: 7,150
Referee: Phil Bentham

Teams:

FRANCE: 1. William Barthau, 2. Frédéric Vaccari, 3. Jean-Philippe Baile, 4. Teddy Sadaoui, 5. Cyril Stacul, 6. Tony Gigot, 7. Nicolas Munoz, 8. Mickaël Simon, 9. Kane Bentley, 10. Rémi Casty, 11. Olivier Elima, 12. Julien Touxagas, 13. Jason Baitieri. Subs: 14. Andrew Bentley, 15. Mathieu Griffi, 16. Sébastien Martins, 17. Romaric Bemba.

SCOTLAND: 1 Lee Paterson, 2. Dave Arnot, 3. Joe Wardle, 4. Kevin Henderson, 5. Jon Steel, 6. Brendan Lindsay, 7. Danny Brough, 8. Oliver Wilkes, 9. Ben Fisher, 10, Mitch Stringer, 11. Alex Szostak, 12. Sam Barlow, 13. Dale Ferguson. Subs: 14. Andrew Henderson, 15. Paddy Coupar, 16. Neil Lowe, 17. Jack Howieson.

17 October 2010

Wales	31–30	Ireland
Tries: Lennon (2), Webster, Williams (2), Roets; Goals: White (3); Drop-goal: Briers.	Report	Tries: Bergin, McNally (2), Boyle, Ambler; Goals: McNally (5)

The Gnoll, Neath, Wales
Attendance: 2,165
Referee: Thierry Alibert (France)
Player of the Match: Gregg McNally

==== Round 3 ====
23 October 2010

France	11–12	Wales
Tries: Nauroy, Sadaoui; Goals: Munoz (1/2); Drop goals: Gigot	Report	Tries: Williams, Thomas; Goals: White (2/3)

Stade Municipal d'Albi, Albi, France
Attendance: 10,413
Referee: Phil Bentham (England)

- Wales are Champions and will play in the 2011 Four Nations.

24 October 2010

Ireland	22–42	Scotland
Tries: Gillam (5, 65) Grix (15), Finn (38); Goals:McNally (3/4)	Report	Tries: Fisher, K.Henderson, A.Henderson, Ferguson 2, Carter, Stringer, Wardle; Goals:Patterson (5/8)

Tallaght Stadium, Dublin, Ireland
Attendance: 1,063
Referee: Thierry Alibert (France)
Player of the Match: Dale Ferguson

=== Ipswich Centennial XIII v Papua New Guinea ===
16 October 2010

Ipswich Centennial XIII	26 – 50	Papua New Guinea

North Ipswich Reserve, Ipswich, Queensland

=== New Zealand Māori v England ===
16 October 2010
5:30pm

Māori	18 – 18	England

Mt Smart Stadium, Auckland
Attendance: 11,512
Referee: Leon Williamson

=== New Zealand vs Samoa ===
16 October 2010

New Zealand	50 – 6	Samoa

Mt Smart Stadium, Auckland
Attendance: 11,650

=== Polynesian Cup ===
24 October 2010

Tonga	6 – 22	Samoa
	Video report

Parramatta Stadium, Sydney
Attendance: 11,308
Referee: Richard Silverwood

=== Four Nations ===
==== Standings ====
2010 Four Nations
Pos	Team	Pld	W	D	L	PF	PA	PD	Pts	Qualification
1	Australia	3	3	0	0	110	34	+76	6	Qualification for Final
2	New Zealand	3	2	0	1	120	56	+64	4	Qualification for Final
3	England	3	1	0	2	60	68	−8	2	
4	Papua New Guinea	3	0	0	3	22	154	−132	0	

Source: Gillette Four Nations

==== Round one ====
===== New Zealand vs England =====
In the curtain raiser match the Junior Kangaroos defeated the Junior Kiwis 24–16.

Saturday, 23 October
8:00pm

New Zealand	24 – 10	England
Tries; Junior Sa'u (4') 1 Lance Hohaia (34') 1 Shaun Kenny-Dowall (44') 1 Benji Marshall (66') 1 Goals; Benji Marshall 4/5	Match details	Tries; 1 (56') James Roby; 1 (58') Gareth Widdop; Goals; 1/2 Gareth Widdop

Westpac Stadium, Wellington, New Zealand
Attendance: 20,681
Referee: Tony Archer

FB	1	Lance Hohaia
RW	2	Jason Nightingale
RC	3	Shaun Kenny-Dowall
LC	4	Junior Sa'u
LW	5	Manu Vatuvei
FE	6	Benji Marshall (c)
HB	7	Nathan Fien
PR	8	Greg Eastwood
HK	9	Thomas Leuluai
PR	10	Adam Blair
SR	11	Simon Mannering
SR	12	Bronson Harrison
LK	13	Jeremy Smith
Substitutions:
BE	14	Issac Luke
BE	15	Ben Matulino
BE	16	Frank-Paul Nuuausala
BE	17	Frank Pritchard
Coach:
Stephen Kearney

FB	1	Gareth Widdop
RW	2	Darrell Goulding
RC	3	Michael Shenton
LC	4	Ryan Atkins
LW	5	Tom Briscoe
SO	6	Kevin Brown
SH	7	Sam Tomkins
PR	8	James Graham (c)
HK	9	James Roby
PR	10	Stuart Fielden
SR	11	Gareth Ellis
SR	12	Sam Burgess
LF	13	Sean O'Loughlin
Substitutions:
BE	14	Luke Robinson
BE	15	Joel Tomkins
BE	16	Ben Westwood
BE	17	Darrell Griffin
Coach:
Steve McNamara

===== Australia vs Papua New Guinea =====
In the curtain raiser match Samoa defeated Tonga 22–6.

Sunday, 24 October
4:00pm

Australia	42 – 0	Papua New Guinea
Tries; Willie Tonga (21', 76') 2 Billy Slater (5') 1 Brent Tate (14') 1 Cooper Cronk (17') 1 Brett Morris (25') 1 Johnathan Thurston (55') 1 Darren Lockyer (59') 1 Goals; Johnathan Thurston 5/8	Match details

Parramatta Stadium, Sydney, Australia
Attendance: 11,308
Referee: Shane Rehm
Player of the Match: Johnathan Thurston

FB	1	Kurt Gidley
RW	2	Brett Morris
RC	3	Brent Tate
LC	4	Willie Tonga
LW	5	David Williams
SO	6	Darren Lockyer (c)
SH	7	Johnathan Thurston
PR	8	Nate Myles
HK	9	Matt Ballin
PR	10	Petero Civoniceva
SR	11	Luke Lewis
SR	12	Sam Thaiday
LF	13	Anthony Watmough
Substitutions:
BE	14	Jamal Idris
BE	15	Tom Learoyd-Lahrs
BE	16	Neville Costigan
BE	17	Brett White
Coach:
Tim Sheens

FB	1	Ryan Tongia
RW	2	Michael Mark
RC	3	Jessie Joe Parker
LC	4	Emmanuel Yere
LW	5	Elizah Riyong
FE	6	Glen Nami
HB	7	Dion Aiye
PR	8	Makali Aizue
HK	9	Charlie Wabo
PR	10	George Moni
SR	11	Rod Griffin
SR	12	David Loko
LK	13	Paul Aiton (c)
Substitutions:
BE	14	Benjamin John
BE	15	Nickson Kolo
BE	16	Larsen Marabe
BE	17	Joseph Pombo
Coach:
Stanley Gene

==== Round two ====
===== New Zealand vs Papua New Guinea =====
In the curtain raiser match the Junior Kiwis defeated the Junior Kangaroos 32–20 to square the series 1-all. The Junior Kangaroos were ahead 20–0 at half time.

With the victory, New Zealand retained the Peter Leitch QSM Challenge Trophy.

Saturday, 30 October
4:00pm

New Zealand	76 – 12	Papua New Guinea
Tries; Sam Perrett (3', 48', 63') 3 Junior Sa'u (25', 43', 45') 3 Jeremy Smith (12', 17') 2 Simon Mannering (7') 1 Lance Hohaia (32') 1 Greg Eastwood (36') 1 Issac Luke (40') 1 Jason Nightingale (72') 1 Sika Manu (76') 1 Goals; Benji Marshall 8/10; Issac Luke 2/4	Match details	Tries; 1 (53') Emmanual Yere; 1 (56') Glen Nami; Goals; 2/2 Ryan Tongia

International Stadium, Rotorua, New Zealand
Attendance: 6,000
Referee: Ben Cummins

FB	1	Lance Hohaia
RW	2	Jason Nightingale
RC	3	Shaun Kenny-Dowall
LC	4	Junior Sa'u
LW	5	Sam Perrett
FE	6	Benji Marshall (c)
HB	7	Nathan Fien
PR	8	Sam McKendry
HK	9	Thomas Leuluai
PR	10	Frank-Paul Nuuausala
SR	11	Sika Manu
SR	12	Simon Mannering
LK	13	Jeremy Smith
Substitutions:
BE	14	Issac Luke
BE	15	Jared Waerea-Hargreaves
BE	16	Bronson Harrison
BE	17	Greg Eastwood
Coach:
Stephen Kearney

FB	1	Ryan Tongia
RW	2	Michael Mark
RC	3	Jessie Joe Parker
LC	4	Emmanuel Yere
LW	5	Elizah Riyong
FE	6	Glen Nami
HB	7	Dion Aiye
PR	8	Makali Aizue
HK	9	Charlie Wabo
PR	10	James Nightingale
SR	11	Rod Griffin
SR	12	Johnson Kuike
LK	13	Paul Aiton (c)
Substitutions:
BE	14	Benjamin John
BE	15	Nickson Kolo
BE	16	Pidi Tongap
BE	17	Alex Haija
Coach:
Stanley Gene

===== Australia vs England =====
Sunday, 31 October
6:30pm

Australia	34 – 14	England
Tries; Luke Lewis (5', 18') 2 Billy Slater (22') 1 Brent Tate (27') 1 Willie Tonga (31') 1 Lote Tuqiri (47') 1 Goals; Cameron Smith 5/7	Match details	Tries; 1 (9') Sam Burgess; 1 (43') Luke Robinson; Goals; 2/2 Ben Westwood; 1/1 Leroy Cudjoe

AAMI Park, Melbourne, Australia
Attendance: 18,894
Referee: Tony Archer
Player of the Match: Luke Lewis

FB	1	Billy Slater
RW	2	Brett Morris
RC	3	Brent Tate
LC	4	Willie Tonga
LW	5	Lote Tuqiri
SO	6	Darren Lockyer (c)
SH	7	Cooper Cronk
PR	8	Nate Myles
HK	9	Cameron Smith
PR	10	Petero Civoniceva
SR	11	Luke Lewis
SR	12	Sam Thaiday
LF	13	Paul Gallen
Substitutions:
BE	14	Kurt Gidley
BE	15	Tom Learoyd-Lahrs
BE	16	Anthony Watmough
BE	17	Luke O'Donnell
Coach:
Tim Sheens

FB	1	Sam Tomkins
RW	2	Darrell Goulding
RC	3	Leroy Cudjoe
LC	4	Ryan Atkins
LW	5	Tom Briscoe
SO	6	Sean O'Loughlin
SH	7	Luke Robinson
PR	8	Sam Burgess
HK	9	James Roby
PR	10	James Graham (c)
SR	11	Gareth Ellis
SR	12	Joel Tomkins
LF	13	Ben Westwood
Substitutions:
BE	14	Stuart Fielden
BE	15	Eorl Crabtree
BE	16	Ben Harrison
BE	17	Shaun Lunt
Coach:
Steve McNamara

==== Round three ====
===== England vs Papua New Guinea =====
Saturday, 6 November
6:00pm (NZDT)

England	36 – 10	Papua New Guinea
Tries; Tony Clubb 4 (18', 30', 40', 76'); Luke Robinson (16', 36') 2 Ben Harrison (55') 1 Goals; Ben Westwood 3/4; Gareth Widdop 1/3	Match details	Tries; 1 (58') Makali Aizue; 1 (66') Emmanuel Yere; Goals; 1/2 Dion Aiye

Eden Park, Auckland, New Zealand
Referee: Shane Rehm

FB	1	Sam Tomkins
RW	2	Ryan Hall
RC	3	Leroy Cudjoe
LC	4	Tony Clubb
LW	5	Tom Briscoe
SO	6	Kevin Brown
SH	7	Luke Robinson
PR	8	James Graham (c)
HK	9	James Roby
PR	10	Sam Burgess
SR	11	Gareth Ellis
SR	12	Ben Westwood
LF	13	Sean O'Loughlin
Substitutions:
BE	14	Darrell Griffin
BE	15	Garreth Carvell
BE	16	Ben Harrison
BE	17	Gareth Widdop
Coach:
Steve McNamara

FB	1	Jessie Joe Parker
RW	2	Michael Mark
RC	3	Elizah Riyong
LC	4	Emmanuel Yere
LW	5	Richard Kembo
FE	6	Glen Nami
HB	7	Dion Aiye
PR	8	Makali Aizue
HK	9	Charlie Wabo
PR	10	Nickson Kolo
SR	11	Rod Griffin
SR	12	David Loko
LK	13	Paul Aiton (c)
Substitutions:
BE	14	Benjamin John
BE	15	George Moni
BE	16	Joseph Pombo
BE	17	Johnson Kuike
Coach:
Stanley Gene

===== New Zealand vs Australia =====
Saturday, 6 November
8:15pm (NZDT)

New Zealand	20 – 34	Australia
Tries; Frank Pritchard (30') 1 Jason Nightingale (64') 1 Shaun Kenny-Dowall (77') 1 Goals; Benji Marshall 4/5	Match details	Tries; 2 (21', 58') Brett Morris; 1 (7') Cooper Cronk; 1 (24') Brent Tate; 1 (46') Darius Boyd; 1 (55') Chris Lawrence; Goals; 3/4 Cameron Smith; 2/2 Todd Carney

Eden Park, Auckland, New Zealand
Attendance: 44,324
Referee: Richard Silverwood
Player of the Match: Paul Gallen

FB	1	Lance Hohaia
RW	2	Jason Nightingale
RC	3	Shaun Kenny-Dowall
LC	4	Junior Sa'u
LW	5	Sam Perrett
FE	6	Benji Marshall (c)
HB	7	Nathan Fien
PR	8	Frank-Paul Nuuausala
HK	9	Thomas Leuluai
PR	10	Adam Blair
SR	11	Sika Manu
SR	12	Simon Mannering
LK	13	Jeremy Smith
Substitutions:
BE	14	Issac Luke
BE	15	Greg Eastwood
BE	16	Frank Pritchard
BE	17	Ben Matulino
Coach:
(New Zealand) Stephen Kearney

FB	1	Darius Boyd
RW	2	Brett Morris
RC	3	Brent Tate
LC	4	Chris Lawrence
LW	5	Lote Tuqiri
SO	6	Todd Carney
SH	7	Cooper Cronk
PR	8	Matthew Scott
HK	9	Cameron Smith (c)
PR	10	David Shillington
SR	11	Greg Bird
SR	12	Sam Thaiday
LF	13	Paul Gallen
Substitutions:
BE	14	Dean Young
BE	15	Petero Civoniceva
BE	16	Tom Learoyd-Lahrs
BE	17	Robbie Farah
Coach:
Tim Sheens

==== Final ====
Saturday, 13 November
8:30pm (AEDT)

Australia	12 – 16	New Zealand
Tries; Brent Tate (4') 1 Billy Slater (59') 1 Goals; Cameron Smith 2/2	Match details	Tries; 1 (36') Shaun Kenny-Dowall; 1 (71') Jason Nightingale; 1 (79') Nathan Fien; Goals; 2/3 Benji Marshall

Suncorp Stadium, Brisbane, Australia
Attendance: 36,299
Referee: (Australia) Tony Archer
Player of the Match: (New Zealand) Jeremy Smith

Australia	Position	New Zealand
Billy Slater	FB	Lance Hohaia
Darius Boyd	WG	Jason Nightingale
Mark Gasnier	CE	Shaun Kenny-Dowall
Willie Tonga	CE	Simon Mannering
Lote Tuqiri	WG	Sam Perrett
Darren Lockyer (c)	FE	Benji Marshall (c)
Jamie Soward	HB	Nathan Fien
Matthew Scott	PR	Adam Blair
Cameron Smith	HK	Thomas Leuluai
David Shillington	PR	Sam McKendry
Luke Lewis	SR	Bronson Harrison
Sam Thaiday	SR	Ben Matulino
Greg Bird	LK	Jeremy Smith
Kurt Gidley	Int	Greg Eastwood
Tom Learoyd-Lahrs	Int	Isaac Luke
Nate Myles	Int	Frank-Paul Nuuausala
Anthony Watmough	Int	Sika Manu

== November ==
=== Atlantic Cup ===
- 16 November 2010: United States 36-26 Jamaica
- 18 November 2010: Canada 12-32 Jamaica
- 20 November 2010: United States 46-12 Canada
