= List of Papua New Guinea national rugby league team players =

This is a list of Papua New Guinea national rugby league team players. 320 players have represented Papua New Guinea Kumuls since 1975 starring with Kumul # 1 Paul Chue and the latest being Morea Morea in 2024 who is PNG Kumul #321.

== Kumuls register ==
No.	Name	Selected^{a}	Matches^{b}
1	Paul Chue	1975	1
2	Albert Age	1975	1
3	Lohia Daroa	1975	2
4	Robin Guere	1975	1
5	Karava Haivita	1975	1
6	Sukope Iko	1975	2
7	Billy Wartovo	1975	1
8	Vai Karawa	1975	1
9	Rod Pearce	1975	2
10	Harrison Patalui	1975	1
11	Tony Bussell	1975	1
12	Elijah Emori	1975	1
13	Tara Gau	1975	7
14	John Wagambie	1975	2
15	Henry Kavanamur	1975	5
16	Eka Fae	1975	1
17	Bill Phillips	1975	1
18	Alan Rero	1977	1
19	Openi Geno	1977	2
20	Dikana Boge	1977	1
21	Peter Pius	1977	1
22	Garia Kora	1977	1
23	Moresby Puek	1977	4
24	Joe Gande	1977	1
25	Paul Tore	1977	1
26	Linus Geni	1977	2
27	John Toban	1977	1
28	Jack Metta	1977	1
29	Kalva Kako	1977	1
30	Joe Tomerop	1977	1
31	Anthony Barle	1978	1
32	David Tamtu	1978	1
33	Paul Kombinari	1978	2
34	Emmanuel Kairu	1977	1
35	D. Bage	1978	1
36	H. Nau	1978	1
37	Stainer Sapu	1978	1
38	Sese Morea	1978	1
39	Tom Bellem	1978	1
40	Hans Tuckerman	1978	1
41	Fred Sabumei	1978	1
42	Kungas Kuveu	1979	6
43	David Tinemau	1979	3
44	Volu Kapani	1979	3
45	John Joseph	1979	4
46	Poka Kila	1979	5
47	Dekot Koki	1979	4
48	Napoleon Bangkoma	1979	2
49	Paul Monama	1979	1
50	Jack Waninara	1979	3
51	Chris Sirosi	1979	1
52	Francis Giheno	1979	1
53	Paul Akis	1979	4
54	John Lingham	1979	4
55	Harry Aope	1979	1
56	Joppa Gomia	1979	2
57	Andrew Limi	1981	1
58	Darius Haili	1981	1
59	H. Paiyesi	1981	1
60	Bernard Waketsi	1981	7
61	Philip Ralda	1981	2
62	John Yip	1981	2
63	Yanga Piakolos	1982	1
64	Jimmy Peter	1982	3
65	Samu Sasama	1982	1
66	J. Tenakanai	1982	1
67	Arebo Taumaku	1982	12
68	Joe Tep	1982	9
69	Joe Katsir	1982	6
70	Ifiso Segeyaro	1982	2
71	D. Timi	1982	1
72	Alfred Kabavas	1982	1
73	Otti Asotau	1982	1
74	Leva Tete	1982	1
75	Roy Loitive	1982	4
76	Francis Matmillo	1982	1
77	Ekon Togili	1982	2
78	Mathias Kitimun	1983	3
79	Kavora Posu	1983	1
80	David Noifa	1983	2
81	W. Waluka	1983	1
82	K. Ario	1983	1
83	Roy Heni	1983	7
84	N. Karai	1984	1
85	Bal Numapo	1984	14
86	Bob Tolik	1984	1
87	Gessau Gebob	1984	2
88	F. Asorifa	1984	1
89	Robert Jakis	1984	1
90	Robert Kubak	1984	1
91	Pora Wek	1984	1
92	Lauta Atoi	1986	7
93	Arnold Tivelit	1986	1
94	Bobby Ako	1986	8
95	Dairi Kovae	1986	9
96	Peter Peng	1986	1
97	Mafu Kerekere	1986	3
98	John Wesley Lakain	1986	3
99	Ati Lomutopa	1986	6
100	Kepi Saea	1986	1
101	Noah Andy	1986	2
102	James Kapia	1987	2
103	Gideon Kouoru	1987	8
104	Mathias Kombra	1987	6
105	Arnold Krewanty	1987	10
106	David Gaius	1987	1
107	Mea Morea	1988	7
108	Isaac Rop	1988	1
109	Michael Matmillo	1988	11
110	Yer Bom	1988	3
111	Tuiyo Evei	1988	11
112	Haoda Kouoru	1988	2
113	Thomas Rombuk	1988	2
114	Ngala Lapan	1988	8
115	Daroa Ben-Moide	1988	6
116	Ipisa Wanega	1988	9
117	Joe Gispe	1988	12
118	Andrew Kuno	1988	3
119	Sam Karara	1988	3
120	Philip Boge	1990	13
121	Stanley Haru	1990	10
122	Gigmai Ongugo	1990	5
123	Michael Angara	1990	10
124	Goro Arigae	1990	1
125	Noah Kool	1990	1
126	Max Tiri	1990	15
127	Chris Itam	1990	5
128	Goie Waine	1990	2
129	Mathew Elara	1990	3
130	Opoe Soga	1990	3
131	Kes Paglipari	1990	8
132	Paul Gela	1991	1
133	Joe Rema	1991	1
134	Elias Kamiak	1991	1
135	James Naipao	1991	11
136	Bernard Bate	1991	1
137	John Unagi	1991	5
138	Thomas Daki	1991	5
139	Joshua Kouoru	1991	4
140	Johannes Kola	1991	1
141	Lipirin Palangat	1991	4
142	Richard Wagambie	1991	8
143	Korul Sinemau	1991	6
144	Danny Moi	1991	2
145	K. Kowrou	1991	1
146	Jack Uradok	1991	4
147	Tuksy Karu	1991	1
148	Leslie Hoffman	1991	4
149	Kera Ngaffin	1991	8
150	August Joseph	1992	3
151	Kini Tani	1992	1
152	Aquila Emil	1992	5
153	Ben Biri	1992	10
154	Steven Kapan	1992	1
155	Nande Yer	1992	11
156	John Piel	1992	1
157	Sauna Babago	1992	1
158	Nere Launa	1992	1
159	David Buko	1994	12
160	James Miviri	1994	3
161	David Gomia	1994	8
162	Ric Emanuel	1994	3
163	Adrian Lam	1994	11
164	Ronald Vue	1994	2
165	James Sikai	1994	1
166	Stanley Gene	1994	16
167	Luke Waldiat	1994	1
168	Mathew Midi	1994	1
169	Peter Dunne	1994	1
170	James Kops	1995	6
171	Elias Paiyo	1995	9
172	David Westley	1995	5
173	Bruce Mamando	1995	10
174	Robert Tela	1995	4
175	Lucas Solbat	1995	3
176	Marcus Bai	1995	12
177	David Reeka	1995	1
178	Robert Sio	1996	3
179	Raymond Kahl	1996	11
180	Simon Kundi	1996	3
181	John Okul	1994	4
182	Reuben Ruing	1996	2
183	Obert Batia	1996	3
184	Mark Mom	1996	8
185	Zachary Kipsy	1996	2
186	John Wilshere	2000	16
187	Alfred Songoro	2000	8
188	Chris Purkikil	2000	4
189	Makali Aizue	2000	11
190	Michael Mondo	2000	6
191	Tom O'Reilly	2000	6
192	Augustine Justine	2000	1
193	Duncan Na'awi	2000	8
194	Alex Krewanty	2000	5
195	Andrew Norman	2000	5
196	Eddie Aila	2000	7
197	Michael Marum	2000	4
198	Stanley Tepend	2001	3
199	Nime Kapo	2001	2
200	John Waka	2001	2
201	Tarzan Malaguna	2001	2
202	Joe Sipa	2001	2
203	Charlie Joe	2001	2
204	Eric Aba	2001	1
205	Lawrence Goiye	2001	1
206	Nigel Hukula	2007	3
207	Chris Lome	2007	1
208	Steve Franciscus	2007	1
209	Tu'u Maori	2007	8
210	Gimapau Keimelo	2007	13
211	Michael Mark	2007	6
212	Jessie Joe Parker	2007	13
213	Keith Peters	2007	8
214	Paul Aiton	2007	16
215	Trevor Exton	2007	4
216	George Moni	2007	8
217	Joseph Omae	2007	4
218	Rod Griffin	2007	14
219	Rodney Pora	2007	6
220	James Nightingale	2007	9
221	Nickson Kolo	2007	11
222	Charlie Wabo	2007	13
223	Kevin Prior	2007	2
224	Menzie Yere	2007	12
225	George Keppa	2007	4
226	Nico Slain	2007	2
227	David Mead	2008	15
228	Neville Costigan	2008	6
229	Jason Chan	2008	8
230	Anton Kui	2008	3
231	Jay Aston	2009	3
232	Ryan Tongia	2010	2
233	Elijah Riyong	2010	3
234	Glen Nami	2010	5
235	Dion Aiye	2010	8
236	David Loko	2010	2
237	Benjamin John	2010	3
238	Larsen Marabe	2010	2
239	Joseph Pombo	2010	3
240	Johnson Kuike	2010	2
241	Pidi Tongap	2010	2
242	Alex Haija	2010	1
243	Richard Kambo	2010	2
244	Josiah Abavu	2013	3
245	Israel Eliab	2013	5
246	Nene Macdonald	2013	13
247	Ray Thompson	2013	4
248	Ase Boas	2013	7
249	Mark Mexico	2013	4
250	Enock Maki	2013	7
251	Jason Tali	2013	3
252	Francis Paniu	2013	1
253	Joe Bruno	2013	1
254	Sebastian Pandia	2013	2
255	Wellington Albert	2013	11
256	Garry Lo	2014	6
257	Thompson Teteh	2014	5
258	Adex Wera	2014	3
259	Roger Laka	2014	1
260	Wartovo Puara	2014	8
261	Esau Siune	2014	1
262	Rhyse Martin	2014	15
263	Adam Korave	2014	3
264	Noel Zeming	2014	2
265	Willie Minoga	2014	7
266	Lawrence Tu'u	2014	1
267	Brandy Peter	2014	3
268	Josh Damen	2015	1
269	Kato Ottio	2015	1
270	Matt Trnka	2015	1
271	Stanton Albert	2015	9
272	Tyson Martin	2009	3
273	Luke Page	2015	11
274	Justin Olam	2016	14
275	Stargroth Amean	2016	7
276	Watson Boas	2016	12
277	Henry Wan	2016	2
278	Timothy Lomai	2016	1
279	Kurt Baptiste	2016	7
280	Richard Pandia	2017	2
281	Tom Butterfield	2017	1
282	Nixon Put	2017	11
283	James Segeyaro	2017	6
284	Lachlan Lam	2017	7
285	Moses Meninga	2017	5
286	Junior Rau	2018	2
287	Rhadley Brawa	2018	2
288	Edene Gebbie	2019	3
289	Bernard Lewis	2019	1
290	Xavier Coates	2019	1
291	Terry Wapi	2019	2
292	Edwin Ipape	2019	7
293	Kyle Laybutt	2019	8
294	Zev John	2019	1
295	Alex Johnston	2019	7
296	Daniel Russell	2019	7
297	Robert Derby	2022	1
298	Solo Wane	2022	1
299	Epel Kapinias	2022	1
300	Sylvester Namo	2022	4
301	Jacob Alick	2022	5
302	Liam Horne	2022	1
303	Emmanuel Waine	2022	2
304	McKenzie Yei	2022	4
305	Dilbert Isaac	2022	1
306	Rodrick Tai	2022	4
307	Keven Appo	2022	2
308	Jimmy Ngutlik	2022	3
309	Wesser Tenza	2022	1
310	Sherwin Tanabi	2022	1
311	Jeremiah Simbiken	2022	2
312	Zac Laybutt	2023	1
313	Judah Rimbu	2023	4
314	Valentine Richard	2023	4
315	Jack de Belin	2023	4
316	Junior Rop	2023	3
317	Benji Kot	2023	2
318	Elijah Roltinga	2024	1
319	Robert Mathias	2024	1
320	Koso Bandi	2024	1
321	Ila Alu	2024	1
322	Morea Morea	2024	1
