= 2010 Rugby League Four Nations =

2010 Four Nations
- Number of teams: 4
- Host countries: Australia; New Zealand
- Winner: New Zealand
- Matches played: 7
- Attendance: 137,436 (19,634 per match)
- Points scored: 340 (48.57 per match)
- Tries scored: 61 (8.71 per match)
- Top scorer: (New Zealand) Benji Marshall (40)
- Top try scorers: (England) Tony Clubb (4) (New Zealand) Junior Sa'u (4) (Australia) Brent Tate (4)

The 2010 Rugby League Four Nations tournament was played in Australia and New Zealand in October and November 2010. The tournament was the second time the Four Nations had been held, following on from the 2009 edition held in England and France.

The series was contested between Australia, England, New Zealand and the winners of the 2009 Pacific Cup, Papua New Guinea.

== Teams ==
Team	Mascot	Coach	Captain	RLIF Rank	Continent
Australia	The Kangaroos	Tim Sheens	Darren Lockyer	1	Oceania
England	The Lions	Steve McNamara	James Graham	3	Europe
New Zealand	The Kiwis	Stephen Kearney	Benji Marshall	2	Oceania
Papua New Guinea	The Kumuls	Stanley Gene	Paul Aiton	6	Oceania

=== Australia ===
Coach: (Australia) Tim Sheens

Of the twenty five players, twenty three were Australian born while two were Fijian born.

Club Team	Players
(Australia) Brisbane Broncos	Darren Lockyer (capt.), Sam Thaiday
(Australia) Canberra Raiders	Tom Learoyd-Lahrs, David Shillington
(Australia) Cronulla-Sutherland Sharks	Paul Gallen
(Australia) Gold Coast Titans	Greg Bird
(Australia) Manly Sea Eagles	Anthony Watmough
(Australia) Melbourne Storm	Cooper Cronk, Billy Slater, Cameron Smith
(Australia) Newcastle Knights	Kurt Gidley
New Zealand Warriors	Brent Tate
(Australia) North Queensland Cowboys	Matthew Scott, Willie Tonga
(Australia) South Sydney Rabbitohs	Greg Inglis
(Australia) Penrith Panthers	Petero Civoniceva, Luke Lewis
(Australia) St. George Illawarra Dragons	Darius Boyd, Brett Morris, Dean Young
(Australia) Sydney Roosters	Todd Carney, Nate Myles
(Australia) Wests Tigers	Chris Lawrence, Robbie Farah, Lote Tuqiri*

* Replaced originally selected Jarryd Hayne after he withdrew due to injury.

=== England ===
Coach: (England) Steve McNamara

All twenty four players were English born.

Club Team	Players
(England) Castleford Tigers	Michael Shenton^{1}
(England) Harlequins RL	Tony Clubb
(England) Huddersfield Giants	Kevin Brown, Leroy Cudjoe, Luke Robinson, Eorl Crabtree, Darrell Griffin, Shaun Lunt
(England) Hull F.C.	Tom Briscoe
(England) Leeds Rhinos	Ryan Hall
(Australia) Melbourne Storm	Gareth Widdop
(Australia) South Sydney Rabbitohs	Sam Burgess
(England) St Helens	James Graham (capt.), James Roby
(England) Warrington Wolves	Ryan Atkins, Ben Harrison, Ben Westwood, Garreth Carvell^{2}
(Australia) Wests Tigers	Gareth Ellis
(England) Wigan Warriors	Darrell Goulding, Sam Tomkins, Joel Tomkins, Stuart Fielden, Sean O'Loughlin

^{1} Ruled out of the rest of the tournament after round one due to injury.

^{2} Replaced originally selected Adrian Morley who was originally selected to captain the squad, but withdrew due to an injury suffered in the pre-tournament match against the New Zealand Māori.; while James Graham was named the team captain.

=== New Zealand ===
Coach: (New Zealand) Stephen Kearney

Of the twenty two players, seventeen were New Zealand born while five were Australian born.

Club Team	Players
(Australia) Canberra Raiders	Bronson Harrison
(England) Leeds Rhinos	Greg Eastwood
(Australia) Melbourne Storm	Adam Blair, Sika Manu
(Australia) Newcastle Knights	Junior Sa'u
(Australia) Penrith Panthers	Frank Pritchard, Sam McKendry^{1}
(Australia) St George Illawarra Dragons	Nathan Fien, Jason Nightingale, Jeremy Smith
(Australia) South Sydney Rabbitohs	Issac Luke
(Australia) Sydney Roosters	Shaun Kenny-Dowall, Frank-Paul Nuuausala, Sam Perrett, Jared Waerea-Hargreaves
New Zealand Warriors	Lewis Brown, Lance Hohaia, Simon Mannering, Ben Matulino, Manu Vatuvei^{2}
(Australia) Wests Tigers	Benji Marshall (capt.)
(England) Wigan Warriors	Thomas Leuluai

^{1} Replaced originally selected Fuifui Moimoi who withdrew due to injury.

^{2} Ruled out of the rest of the tournament after round one due to injury.

Antonio Winterstein and Lewis Brown were included in the squad but not selected to play in any of the tournament's matches.

=== Papua New Guinea ===
Coach: (Papua New Guinea) Stanley Gene

Of the twenty four players, fourteen were Papua New Guinea born while one was Australian born.

Club Team	Players
(Papua New Guinea) Agmark Rabaul Gurias	Dion Aiye, Larsen Marabe, George Moni, Rodney Pora, Pidi Tongap
(New Zealand) Haswell Hornets	Joseph Pombo
(Australia) Cronulla Sharks	Paul Aiton (capt.)
(Papua New Guinea) Enga Mioks	David Loko
(England) Featherstone Rovers	Jessie Joe Parker
(Australia) Gold Coast Titans	Ryan Tongia
(Papua New Guinea) Goroka Bintangor Lahanis	Glen Nami
(England) Halifax	Makali Aizue
(England) Hunslet Hawks	Michael Mark, Charlie Wabo
(Australia) Ipswich Jets	Desmond Mok
(Papua New Guinea) Masta Mak Rangers	Nickson Kolo, Johnson Kuike
(Papua New Guinea) Mendi Muruks	Elizah Riyong
(Australia) Newtown Jets	Richard Kambo
(Australia) Northern Pride	Rod Griffin
(Australia) North Sydney Bears	James Nightingale*
(Australia) Parkes Spacemen	Benjamin John
(England) Sheffield Eagles	Menzie Yere
QRL	Alex Haija

* Replaced originally selected Sigfred Gande who withdrew due to injury just hours before the tournament started.

== Venues ==
The games were played at venues in Australia and New Zealand. The tournament final was played in Brisbane.

Brisbane	Wellington	Sydney
Suncorp Stadium	Westpac Stadium	Parramatta Stadium
Capacity: 52,500	Capacity: 34,500	Capacity: 21,500
Rotorua	Melbourne	Auckland
International Stadium	AAMI Park	Eden Park
Capacity: 26,000	Capacity: 30,050	Capacity: 50,000

== Officiating ==
Three referees were initially appointed to control matches in the Four Nations:

- (Australia) Tony Archer (3 matches)
- (New Zealand) Shane Rehm (2 matches)
- (England) Richard Silverwood (1 match)

Richard Silverwood suffered a leg injury and missed round two. He was replaced for this round by Australian referee Ben Cummins.

== Pre-tournament matches ==
Before the series, New Zealand played an additional Test against Samoa. It was the first time the two nations have clashed. England played Cumbria on 3 October as a memorial match for Gary Purdham. England also faced the New Zealand Māori rugby league team in a curtain raiser to the New Zealand-Samoa test.

=== Papua New Guinea vs Prime Ministers XIII ===
25 September 2010

Papua New Guinea	18 – 30	(Australia) Prime Minister's XIII

Lloyd Robson Oval, Port Moresby
Attendance: 10,000 approx.

=== Cumbria vs England ===
3 October 2010

Cumbria	18 – 18	England

Recreation Ground, Whitehaven
Attendance: 5,250
Referee: Phil Bentham

=== Ipswich Centennial XIII v Papua New Guinea ===
16 October 2010

Ipswich Centennial XIII	26 – 50	Papua New Guinea

North Ipswich Reserve, Ipswich, Queensland

=== New Zealand Māori v England ===
16 October 2010
5:30pm

Māori	18 – 18	England

Mt Smart Stadium, Auckland
Attendance: 11,512
Referee: Leon Williamson

=== New Zealand vs Samoa ===
Peter Leitch QSM Challenge Trophy

16 October 2010
7:35pm

New Zealand	50 – 6	Samoa

Mt Smart Stadium, Auckland
Attendance: 11,512
Referee: Shane Rehm

== Results ==
=== Standings ===
2010 Four Nations
Pos	Team	Pld	W	D	L	PF	PA	PD	Pts	Qualification
1	Australia	3	3	0	0	110	34	+76	6	Qualification for Final
2	New Zealand	3	2	0	1	120	56	+64	4	Qualification for Final
3	England	3	1	0	2	60	68	−8	2	
4	Papua New Guinea	3	0	0	3	22	154	−132	0	

Source: Gillette Four Nations

=== Round one ===
==== New Zealand vs England ====
In the curtain raiser match the Junior Kangaroos defeated the Junior Kiwis 24–16.

Saturday, 23 October
8:00pm

New Zealand	24 – 10	England
Tries; Junior Sa'u (4') 1 Lance Hohaia (34') 1 Shaun Kenny-Dowall (44') 1 Benji Marshall (66') 1 Goals; Benji Marshall 4/5	Match details	Tries; 1 (56') James Roby; 1 (58') Gareth Widdop; Goals; 1/2 Gareth Widdop

Westpac Stadium, Wellington, New Zealand
Attendance: 20,681
Referee: Tony Archer

FB	1	Lance Hohaia
RW	2	Jason Nightingale
RC	3	Shaun Kenny-Dowall
LC	4	Junior Sa'u
LW	5	Manu Vatuvei
FE	6	Benji Marshall (c)
HB	7	Nathan Fien
PR	8	Greg Eastwood
HK	9	Thomas Leuluai
PR	10	Adam Blair
SR	11	Simon Mannering
SR	12	Bronson Harrison
LK	13	Jeremy Smith
Substitutions:
BE	14	Issac Luke
BE	15	Ben Matulino
BE	16	Frank-Paul Nuuausala
BE	17	Frank Pritchard
Coach:
Stephen Kearney

FB	1	Gareth Widdop
RW	2	Darrell Goulding
RC	3	Michael Shenton
LC	4	Ryan Atkins
LW	5	Tom Briscoe
SO	6	Kevin Brown
SH	7	Sam Tomkins
PR	8	James Graham (c)
HK	9	James Roby
PR	10	Stuart Fielden
SR	11	Gareth Ellis
SR	12	Sam Burgess
LF	13	Sean O'Loughlin
Substitutions:
BE	14	Luke Robinson
BE	15	Joel Tomkins
BE	16	Ben Westwood
BE	17	Darrell Griffin
Coach:
Steve McNamara

==== Australia vs Papua New Guinea ====
In the curtain raiser match Samoa defeated Tonga 22–6.

Sunday, 24 October
4:00pm

Australia	42 – 0	Papua New Guinea
Tries; Willie Tonga (21', 76') 2 Billy Slater (5') 1 Brent Tate (14') 1 Cooper Cronk (17') 1 Brett Morris (25') 1 Johnathan Thurston (55') 1 Darren Lockyer (59') 1 Goals; Johnathan Thurston 5/8	Match details

Parramatta Stadium, Sydney, Australia
Attendance: 11,308
Referee: Shane Rehm
Player of the Match: Johnathan Thurston

FB	1	Kurt Gidley
RW	2	Brett Morris
RC	3	Brent Tate
LC	4	Willie Tonga
LW	5	David Williams
SO	6	Darren Lockyer (c)
SH	7	Johnathan Thurston
PR	8	Nate Myles
HK	9	Matt Ballin
PR	10	Petero Civoniceva
SR	11	Luke Lewis
SR	12	Sam Thaiday
LF	13	Anthony Watmough
Substitutions:
BE	14	Jamal Idris
BE	15	Tom Learoyd-Lahrs
BE	16	Neville Costigan
BE	17	Brett White
Coach:
Tim Sheens

FB	1	Ryan Tongia
RW	2	Michael Mark
RC	3	Jessie Joe Parker
LC	4	Emmanuel Yere
LW	5	Elizah Riyong
FE	6	Glen Nami
HB	7	Dion Aiye
PR	8	Makali Aizue
HK	9	Charlie Wabo
PR	10	George Moni
SR	11	Rod Griffin
SR	12	David Loko
LK	13	Paul Aiton (c)
Substitutions:
BE	14	Benjamin John
BE	15	Nickson Kolo
BE	16	Larsen Marabe
BE	17	Joseph Pombo
Coach:
Stanley Gene

=== Round two ===
==== New Zealand vs Papua New Guinea ====
In the curtain raiser match the Junior Kiwis defeated the Junior Kangaroos 32–20 to square the series 1-all. The Junior Kangaroos were ahead 20–0 at half time.

With the victory, New Zealand retained the Peter Leitch QSM Challenge Trophy.

Saturday, 30 October
4:00pm

New Zealand	76 – 12	Papua New Guinea
Tries; Sam Perrett (3', 48', 63') 3 Junior Sa'u (25', 43', 45') 3 Jeremy Smith (12', 17') 2 Simon Mannering (7') 1 Lance Hohaia (32') 1 Greg Eastwood (36') 1 Issac Luke (40') 1 Jason Nightingale (72') 1 Sika Manu (76') 1 Goals; Benji Marshall 8/10; Issac Luke 2/4	Match details	Tries; 1 (53') Emmanual Yere; 1 (56') Glen Nami; Goals; 2/2 Ryan Tongia

International Stadium, Rotorua, New Zealand
Attendance: 6,000
Referee: Ben Cummins

FB	1	Lance Hohaia
RW	2	Jason Nightingale
RC	3	Shaun Kenny-Dowall
LC	4	Junior Sa'u
LW	5	Sam Perrett
FE	6	Benji Marshall (c)
HB	7	Nathan Fien
PR	8	Sam McKendry
HK	9	Thomas Leuluai
PR	10	Frank-Paul Nuuausala
SR	11	Sika Manu
SR	12	Simon Mannering
LK	13	Jeremy Smith
Substitutions:
BE	14	Issac Luke
BE	15	Jared Waerea-Hargreaves
BE	16	Bronson Harrison
BE	17	Greg Eastwood
Coach:
Stephen Kearney

FB	1	Ryan Tongia
RW	2	Michael Mark
RC	3	Jessie Joe Parker
LC	4	Emmanuel Yere
LW	5	Elizah Riyong
FE	6	Glen Nami
HB	7	Dion Aiye
PR	8	Makali Aizue
HK	9	Charlie Wabo
PR	10	James Nightingale
SR	11	Rod Griffin
SR	12	Johnson Kuike
LK	13	Paul Aiton (c)
Substitutions:
BE	14	Benjamin John
BE	15	Nickson Kolo
BE	16	Pidi Tongap
BE	17	Alex Haija
Coach:
Stanley Gene

==== Australia vs England ====
Sunday, 31 October
6:30pm

Australia	34 – 14	England
Tries; Luke Lewis (5', 18') 2 Billy Slater (22') 1 Brent Tate (27') 1 Willie Tonga (31') 1 Lote Tuqiri (47') 1 Goals; Cameron Smith 5/7	Match details	Tries; 1 (9') Sam Burgess; 1 (43') Luke Robinson; Goals; 2/2 Ben Westwood; 1/1 Leroy Cudjoe

AAMI Park, Melbourne, Australia
Attendance: 18,894
Referee: Tony Archer
Player of the Match: Luke Lewis

FB	1	Billy Slater
RW	2	Brett Morris
RC	3	Brent Tate
LC	4	Willie Tonga
LW	5	Lote Tuqiri
SO	6	Darren Lockyer (c)
SH	7	Cooper Cronk
PR	8	Nate Myles
HK	9	Cameron Smith
PR	10	Petero Civoniceva
SR	11	Luke Lewis
SR	12	Sam Thaiday
LF	13	Paul Gallen
Substitutions:
BE	14	Kurt Gidley
BE	15	Tom Learoyd-Lahrs
BE	16	Anthony Watmough
BE	17	Luke O'Donnell
Coach:
Tim Sheens

FB	1	Sam Tomkins
RW	2	Darrell Goulding
RC	3	Leroy Cudjoe
LC	4	Ryan Atkins
LW	5	Tom Briscoe
SO	6	Sean O'Loughlin
SH	7	Luke Robinson
PR	8	Sam Burgess
HK	9	James Roby
PR	10	James Graham (c)
SR	11	Gareth Ellis
SR	12	Joel Tomkins
LF	13	Ben Westwood
Substitutions:
BE	14	Stuart Fielden
BE	15	Eorl Crabtree
BE	16	Ben Harrison
BE	17	Shaun Lunt
Coach:
Steve McNamara

=== Round three ===
==== England vs Papua New Guinea ====
Saturday, 6 November
6:00pm (NZDT)

England	36 – 10	Papua New Guinea
Tries; Tony Clubb 4 (18', 30', 40', 76'); Luke Robinson (16', 36') 2 Ben Harrison (55') 1 Goals; Ben Westwood 3/4; Gareth Widdop 1/3	Match details	Tries; 1 (58') Makali Aizue; 1 (66') Emmanuel Yere; Goals; 1/2 Dion Aiye

Eden Park, Auckland, New Zealand
Referee: Shane Rehm

FB	1	Sam Tomkins
RW	2	Ryan Hall
RC	3	Leroy Cudjoe
LC	4	Tony Clubb
LW	5	Tom Briscoe
SO	6	Kevin Brown
SH	7	Luke Robinson
PR	8	James Graham (c)
HK	9	James Roby
PR	10	Sam Burgess
SR	11	Gareth Ellis
SR	12	Ben Westwood
LF	13	Sean O'Loughlin
Substitutions:
BE	14	Darrell Griffin
BE	15	Garreth Carvell
BE	16	Ben Harrison
BE	17	Gareth Widdop
Coach:
Steve McNamara

FB	1	Jessie Joe Parker
RW	2	Michael Mark
RC	3	Elizah Riyong
LC	4	Emmanuel Yere
LW	5	Richard Kembo
FE	6	Glen Nami
HB	7	Dion Aiye
PR	8	Makali Aizue
HK	9	Charlie Wabo
PR	10	Nickson Kolo
SR	11	Rod Griffin
SR	12	David Loko
LK	13	Paul Aiton (c)
Substitutions:
BE	14	Benjamin John
BE	15	George Moni
BE	16	Joseph Pombo
BE	17	Johnson Kuike
Coach:
Stanley Gene

==== New Zealand vs Australia ====
Saturday, 6 November
8:15pm (NZDT)

New Zealand	20 – 34	Australia
Tries; Frank Pritchard (30') 1 Jason Nightingale (64') 1 Shaun Kenny-Dowall (77') 1 Goals; Benji Marshall 4/5	Match details	Tries; 2 (21', 58') Brett Morris; 1 (7') Cooper Cronk; 1 (24') Brent Tate; 1 (46') Darius Boyd; 1 (55') Chris Lawrence; Goals; 3/4 Cameron Smith; 2/2 Todd Carney

Eden Park, Auckland, New Zealand
Attendance: 44,324
Referee: Richard Silverwood
Player of the Match: Paul Gallen

FB	1	Lance Hohaia
RW	2	Jason Nightingale
RC	3	Shaun Kenny-Dowall
LC	4	Junior Sa'u
LW	5	Sam Perrett
FE	6	Benji Marshall (c)
HB	7	Nathan Fien
PR	8	Frank-Paul Nuuausala
HK	9	Thomas Leuluai
PR	10	Adam Blair
SR	11	Sika Manu
SR	12	Simon Mannering
LK	13	Jeremy Smith
Substitutions:
BE	14	Issac Luke
BE	15	Greg Eastwood
BE	16	Frank Pritchard
BE	17	Ben Matulino
Coach:
(New Zealand) Stephen Kearney

FB	1	Darius Boyd
RW	2	Brett Morris
RC	3	Brent Tate
LC	4	Chris Lawrence
LW	5	Lote Tuqiri
SO	6	Todd Carney
SH	7	Cooper Cronk
PR	8	Matthew Scott
HK	9	Cameron Smith (c)
PR	10	David Shillington
SR	11	Greg Bird
SR	12	Sam Thaiday
LF	13	Paul Gallen
Substitutions:
BE	14	Dean Young
BE	15	Petero Civoniceva
BE	16	Tom Learoyd-Lahrs
BE	17	Robbie Farah
Coach:
Tim Sheens

=== Final ===
Saturday, 13 November
8:30pm (AEDT)

Australia	12 – 16	New Zealand
Tries; Brent Tate (4') 1 Billy Slater (59') 1 Goals; Cameron Smith 2/2	Match details	Tries; 1 (36') Shaun Kenny-Dowall; 1 (71') Jason Nightingale; 1 (79') Nathan Fien; Goals; 2/3 Benji Marshall

Suncorp Stadium, Brisbane, Australia
Attendance: 36,299
Referee: (Australia) Tony Archer
Player of the Match: (New Zealand) Jeremy Smith

Australia	Position	New Zealand
Billy Slater	FB	Lance Hohaia
Darius Boyd	WG	Jason Nightingale
Mark Gasnier	CE	Shaun Kenny-Dowall
Willie Tonga	CE	Simon Mannering
Lote Tuqiri	WG	Sam Perrett
Darren Lockyer (c)	FE	Benji Marshall (c)
Cooper Cronk	HB	Nathan Fien
Matthew Scott	PR	Adam Blair
Cameron Smith	HK	Thomas Leuluai
David Shillington	PR	Sam McKendry
Luke Lewis	SR	Bronson Harrison
Sam Thaiday	SR	Ben Matulino
Greg Bird	LK	Jeremy Smith
Kurt Gidley	Int	Greg Eastwood
Tom Learoyd-Lahrs	Int	Isaac Luke
Nate Myles	Int	Frank-Paul Nuuausala
Anthony Watmough	Int	Sika Manu

== Broadcasting details ==
The Four Nations was broadcast to over 60 countries worldwide.

- Australia:
  - Nine Network – All Kangaroos matches live (except New Zealand vs Australia) plus the final, others delayed
  - Fox Sports – Some live and some delayed
- Brunei, Malaysia and Indonesia:
  - Astro – All Matches Live
- Fiji, Cook Islands, Marshall Islands, Palau, Tahiti, Vanuatu, Tuvalu, Wallis and Futuna, Tokelau, Marianas, French Polynesia, Kiribati, Nauru, New Caledonia and Guam:
  - FijiTV – All Matches Live
- New Zealand:
  - Sky Sport – All Matches Live
  - Prime – All New Zealand matches delayed
- Niue:
  - Broadcasting Corporation of Niue – All Matches Live
- Papua New Guinea:
  - EMTV – All Matches Live
- Samoa:
  - Samoa Broadcasting Corporation – All Matches Live
- Singapore:
  - StarHub – All Matches Live
- Tonga and Solomon Islands:
  - Tonga Broadcasting Commission – All Matches Live
- Bosnia, Slovenia, Serbia, Poland, Romania, Hungary and Croatia:
- SportKlub – All Matches Live
- Ireland:
  - BSkyB – Live coverage of all matches except NZ v England & Australia v PNG.
- United Kingdom:
  - BSkyB – Live coverage of all matches except NZ v England & Australia v PNG.
  - BBC – Live coverage of NZ v England & Australia v PNG. All other matches delayed.
- Afghanistan, Chad, Syria, Sudan, Tunisia, Yemen, United Arab Emirates, Djibouti, Egypt, Iran, Iraq, Jordan, Kuwait, Lebanon, Libya, Mauritania, Morocco, Qatar, Oman, Somalia, Saudi Arabia, Bahrain and Algeria
  - Orbit Showtime Network – All Matches Live
- Sub-Sahra Region and South Africa
  - SuperSport – Coverage of tournament final
- Canada, the United States of America and the Caribbean:
  - Fox Soccer Channel – All Matches Live
