= Peter Leitch QSM Challenge Trophy =

Rugby league challenge trophy

- Sport: Rugby league
- Founded: 2008
- Administrator: New Zealand Rugby League
- No. of teams: 6
- Country: Cook Islands; Fiji; New Zealand; Papua New Guinea; Samoa; Tonga
- Most recent champion: New Zealand
- Most titles: New Zealand (5 defences)

The Peter Leitch QSM Challenge Trophy (often shortened to "the Peter Leitch Challenge Trophy") is a rugby league challenge trophy that is contested when the New Zealand national rugby league team play a Pacific island side in non-Rugby League World Cup internationals. Rugby League Four Nations games, however, do count and the challenge trophy has been contested at both the 2010 and 2014 editions. The trophy is named after New Zealand businessmen, philanthropist and Rugby League advocate Peter Leitch.

== History ==
On 15 October 2008 New Zealand Rugby League (NZRL) chairman Ray Haffenden announced that the Kiwis vs Tonga Test Match would be used to launch the Peter Leitch QSM Challenge Trophy. The NZRL wished to "acknowledged the close affinity and involvement [Leitch] has had with the Pacific Island and rugby league communities in New Zealand for many years."

While held infrequently it was the NZRL's intention that the trophy will "be at stake in future internationals between the Kiwis and our Pacific neighbours.”

The 2011 edition was cancelled by the NZRL due to a high number of injured New Zealand players. This match would have been the first Rugby League test between the Cooks Islands and New Zealand.

== Results ==
18 October 2008

New Zealand	56–8	Tonga
	Report

Mt Smart Stadium, Auckland
Attendance: 5,000

14 October 2009

New Zealand	40–24	Tonga
	Report

Rotorua International Stadium, Rotorua
Attendance: 8,000

16 October 2010

New Zealand	50–6	Samoa
	Report

Mt Smart Stadium, Auckland
Attendance: 11,512

6 October 2011

Cook Islands	Cancelled by the NZRL	New Zealand
	Report

Avarua Tereora Stadium, Rarotonga
Attendance: Match cancelled

2010 Rugby League Four Nations

30 October 2010

New Zealand	76–12	Papua New Guinea
	Report

Rotorua International Stadium, Rotorua
Attendance: 6,000
Referee: (New Zealand) Ben Cummins

2014 Rugby League Four Nations

1 November 2014

New Zealand	14–12	Samoa
	Report

Toll Stadium, Whangārei
Attendance: 16,912
Referee: (New Zealand) Henry Perenara
Player of the Match: (New Zealand) Kieran Foran

22 June 2019

New Zealand	34–14	Tonga
	Report

Mt Smart Stadium, Auckland
Attendance: 23,624
Referee: (Australia) Ben Cummins

== Results by team ==
Country	Challenges	Defences	Losses
New Zealand	6	6	0
Tonga	3	0	3
Samoa	2	0	2
Papua New Guinea	1	0	1
Cook Islands	0	0	0
Fiji	0	0	0

== See also ==
- List of international rugby league teams
- List of rugby league competitions
- Rugby League Four Nations
