= Paul Chue =

Papua New Guinean international rugby league player

Personal information
- Born: 1946 (age 79–80) Papua New Guinea

Playing information
- Position: Halfback
Representative
Years	Team	Pld	T	G	FG	P
1975	Papua New Guinea	1	0	0	0	0

Paul Chue (born 1946) is a former Papua New Guinean national representative rugby league player. Chue captained Papua New Guinea in their first ever test match against England in 1975. He is regarded as Kumul number one.

== Biography ==
Chue was born in Papua New Guinea and took up rugby union in his school years at St Joseph's College, Hunters Hill in Sydney. He was the first boy of Asian heritage to make that school's rugby first XV when selected in 1963. Following school he studied commerce at the University of New South Wales.

Back in New Guinea Chue took to rugby league and in 1973 captained a Rabaul representative side. He made his sole national representative appearance for the Kumuls in their debut international match against England in Port Moresby in 1975. That match was played to celebrate the new nation's independence.

Chue's business career was with the PNG soft drink firm Pacific Industries Ltd founded by his father Gabriel Achun Chue. Paul Chue married Kathleen Duffy in 1982 and ran that business from 1968 and following the COVID period was succeeded by two of their sons Ashlon Chue, Everett Chue and their daughter Sharani Chan.
