= Shane Rehm =

New Zealand rugby league referee

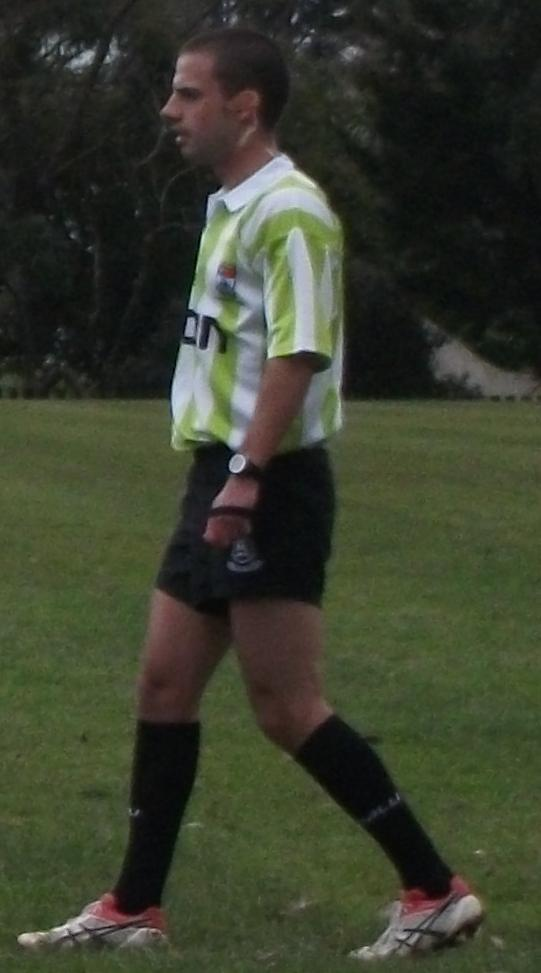
- Rehm in 2010

Refereeing information
Years	Competition	Apps
2010	Four Nations	2
2010	Other Internationals	1
2005–2017	Auckland Rugby League

Shane Rehm is a New Zealand rugby league referee. An international referee, Rehm has also controlled Auckland Rugby League, New Zealand Rugby League and Toyota Cup matches since 2009.

== Playing career ==
Rehm has refereed in NSW Cup and Toyota Cup matches. On 26 June 2011 he was appointed to be a touch judge in a National Rugby League match.

In 2012 he received a Prime Minister's Scholarship from Sport NZ to allow him to travel to Australia to further his refereeing career.

== International career ==
Rehm was named the New Zealand Rugby League's 2010 referee of the year. As a result, he was appointed to be New Zealand's referee in the 2010 Four Nations and he also controlled the New Zealand national rugby league team test match against Samoa. He was a touch judge in the 2011 Four Nations final.
