= Rugby League Four Nations =

- Founded: 2009
- Abolished: 2016
- Region: International (RLIF)
- Teams: 4
- Related competitions: World Cup
- Last champions: Australia (3rd title)
- Most championships: Australia (3 titles)

The Rugby League Four Nations was a rugby league football tournament run in partnership between Australia, England, New Zealand, and a guest nation which changed with every edition.

The tournament replaced the previous Tri-Nations format by including a fourth nation that qualifies by winning their respective regional competition in a rotation between Europe and the South Pacific.

== History ==
=== Pre–2008: Origins ===
The Four Nations replaced the Tri-Nations tournament that was contested between Australia, New Zealand and Great Britain. The competition ceased in 2006 with the RLIF wanting more nations to play in regular tournaments with the 'Big Three'. England replaced Great Britain as the third nation and the fourth nation has to qualify, depending on where the tournament is being played the fourth nation is either from the Northern or Southern Hemisphere.

=== 2009–2016: Tournaments ===
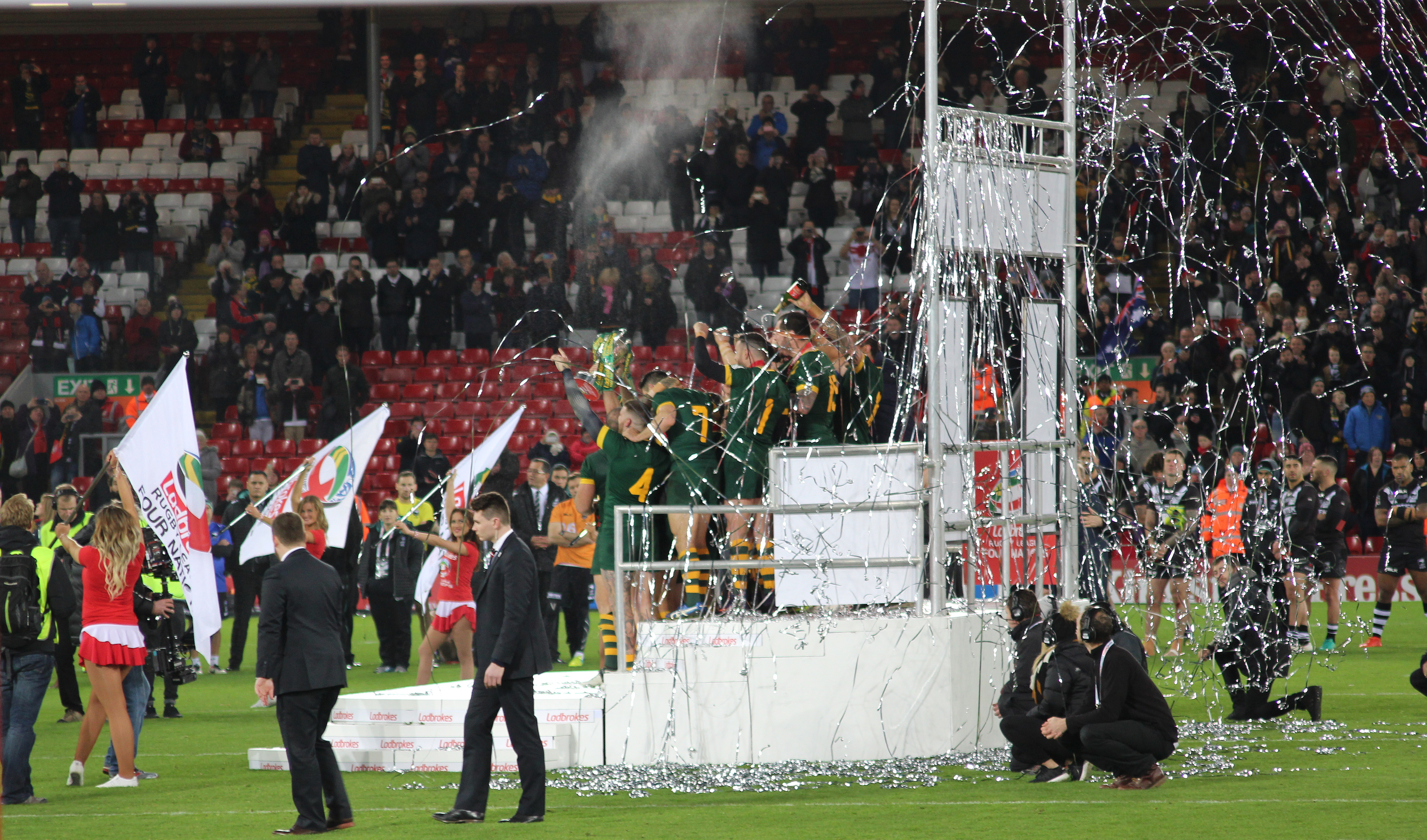
Australia celebrating winning the 2016 and final edition of the tournament

The inaugural Four Nations was played in England and France in 2009 with France qualifying to be the fourth nation via winning the 2005 European Championship. The big three dominated the tournament with Australia beating England in the final. The next tournament was played the following year in 2010 with Australia and New Zealand hosting the tournament. Papua New Guinea qualified as the fourth nation through the 2009 Pacific Cup. The big three again dominated and Australia beat New Zealand in the final for their third title. 2011 was the third consecutive year the tournament took place, and it was held in England and Wales, Wales qualified by winning the 2010 European Championship. The final was a repeat of 2009 with Australia beating England. The tournament was not played in 2012 to give teams a rest before the 2013 World Cup.

The next Four Nations was played in 2014 after the World Cup. The competition was played in the Southern Hemisphere for the first time since 2010 with Samoa qualifying as the fourth nation. Samoa impressed, although they did not win a game they had close games against the big three. New Zealand beat Australia in the final. The following, and what would be final tournament took place in England in 2016. Scotland qualified for the tournament and also became the first qualifying nation to avoid losing every game when they drew with New Zealand 18-18. The final for the 2016 tournament took place at Anfield Stadium in Liverpool where Australia won for the third time in five tournaments, defeating New Zealand in the final.

== Format ==
=== Qualification ===
The fourth nation alternated between Europe and the Pacific and saw a different team take part in each competition.

In 2009 a qualifying tournament was held, the Pacific Cup, involving Papua New Guinea, Samoa, Tonga, Fiji, and the Cook Islands. The winners, Papua New Guinea, qualified for the 2010 Four Nations. Likewise in 2010, the European Nations Cup decided the fourth participant in the 2011 tournament, Wales. In 2014, a single game was staged to decide the fourth team for that year, with Samoa beating Fiji 32–16. That same year, it was announced that the winner of the 2014 European Cup would qualify for the 2016 Four Nations, the winning team being Scotland who qualified on points difference by three points over France.

Year	Competition	Qualifier
2009	2005 European Nations Cup	France
2010	2009 Pacific Cup	Papua New Guinea
2011	2010 European Nations Cup	Wales
2014	2014 Pacific Qualifier	Samoa
2016	2014 European Nations Cup	Scotland

=== Competition ===
The tournament was organised in round-robin format. Each team played the others once, before the top two teams played each other in a tournament final. The top two teams were calculated using a league table. Teams received:

- 2 points for a win
- 1 point for a draw
- 0 points for a loss

== Results ==
To date no fourth nation has appeared in the final of the Four Nations and no team from outside of Oceania has won the tournament despite England appearing in two finals, losing both to Australia. Furthermore, no fourth nation has even won a single game however Scotland managed to draw 18–18 against New Zealand in 2016. Samoa came close to a win in 2014 losing their first two games by just one try.

The largest winning margin in a game was in 2010 when New Zealand beat Papua New Guinea by 76–12, a margin of 64 points. There has only been two draws in the history of the tournament when Australia and New Zealand fought out a 20–20 draw in the 2009 tournament and again a draw when New Zealand played Scotland in the 2016 tournament with an 18–18 draw.

=== Tournaments ===
Year	Host(s)	Champions	Final score	Runner-up	Third Place	Fourth Place
2009	England; France	Australia	46–16	England	New Zealand	France
2010	Australia; New Zealand	New Zealand	16–12	Australia	England	Papua New Guinea
2011	England; Wales	Australia	30–8	England	New Zealand	Wales
2014	Australia; New Zealand	New Zealand	22–18	Australia	England	Samoa
2016	England	Australia	34–8	New Zealand	England	Scotland

=== Results by Nation ===
Country	Appearances	Champions	Runners-up
Australia	5	3 (2009, 2011, 2016)	2 (2010, 2014)
New Zealand	5	2 (2010, 2014)	1 (2016)
England	5	0	2 (2009, 2011)
France	1	0	0
Papua New Guinea	1	0	0
Samoa	1	0	0
Wales	1	0	0
Scotland	1	0	0

== Sponsorship ==
Period	Sponsor	Name
2009–14	Gillette	Gillette Four Nations
2016	Ladbrokes	Ladbrokes Four Nations

== Attendances ==
(as of 20 November 2016)

=== Average Attendances ===
The average attendances of the Four Nations tournaments fluctuate between the northern and southern hemisphere competitions with the southern hemisphere always having higher averages than the previous tournaments in the northern hemisphere. The largest change between two tournaments was between 2009 and 2010 which saw an 18.45% increase or an average of 3,060. The largest total stadium capacity was 214,500 in 2010 despite this tournament having the lowest stadium occupancy with 64.10%.

Year	Host	Total attendance	Matches	Average attendance	% of change	Stadium Capacity	% Capacity
2009	England; France	116,089	7	16,584	N/A	159,300	72.97%
2010	Australia; New Zealand	137,504	7	19,644	▲18.45%	214,500	64.10%
2011	England; Wales	128,065	7	18,295	▼6.86%	193,100	66.32%
2014	Australia; New Zealand	144,722	7	20,675	▲13.00%	201,400	71.85%
2016	England	132,655	7	18,951	▼8.33%	193,300	68.62%

=== Highest Attendances ===
To date, there has been 4 attendances over 40,000 and 8 attendances over 30,000. Three of these attendances were double-headers which took place at Eden Park, Auckland in 2010, Wembley Stadium, London in 2011 and Lang Park, Brisbane in 2014; the latter two double-headers are also the largest attendances in the respective hemispheres. Four of these games were tournament finals in 2009, 2010, 2011 and 2016. Only one final did not have an attendance over 30,000, this being the 2014 edition.

Rank	Game	Stadium	Attendance	Event
1	England v Samoa; Australia v New Zealand	Lang Park, Brisbane, Australia (double-header)	47,813	2014
2	Australia v New Zealand; England v Papua New Guinea	Eden Park, Auckland, New Zealand (double-header)	44,324	2010
3	Wales v New Zealand; England v Australia	Wembley Stadium, London, England (double-header)	42,344	2011
4	Australia v New Zealand (final)	Anfield, Liverpool, England	40,042	2016
5	Australia v New Zealand (final)	Lang Park, Brisbane, Australia	36,299	2010

=== Venues ===
As of 2016 Four Nations (in order of matches played and highest attendance).

Stadium	City	Matches played	Highest Attendance
Lang Park	Brisbane	3	47,813
Eden Park	Auckland	2	44,324
Wembley Stadium	London	2	42,344
Elland Road	Leeds	2	34,174
Westpac Stadium	Wellington	2	25,093
Galpharm Stadium	Huddersfield	2	24,070
AAMI Park	Melbourne	2	20,585
London Stadium	London	1	35,569
KC Stadium	Hull	1	23,447
DW Stadium	Wigan	1	23,122
Ricoh Arena	Coventry	1	21,009
WIN Stadium	Wollongong	1	18,456
Toll Stadium	Whangārei	1	16,912
Forsyth Barr Stadium	Dunedin	1	15,863
Halliwell Jones Stadium	Warrington	1	12,491
Stade Ernest-Wallon	Toulouse	1	12,412
Twickenham Stoop	London	1	12,360
Keepmoat Stadium	Doncaster	1	11,529
Parramatta Stadium	Sydney	1	11,308
Leigh Sports Village	Leigh	1	10,377
Derwent Park	Workington	1	6,628
Stade Sébastien Charléty	Paris	1	6,234
Rotorua International Stadium	Rotorua	1	6,000
KC Lightstream Stadium	Kingston upon Hull	1	5,337
Racecourse Ground	Wrexham	1	5,233

== Player statistics ==
(As of 2016 Four Nations)

=== Overall try-scorers ===
Over the history of the competition 125 players have scored tries. The top try-scorers are Jason Nightingale of New Zealand and Ryan Hall of England with 11 tries each. The highest try-scorer from a 'fourth nation' is Daniel Vidot from Samoa who scored 3 tries in the 2014 competition. Australia has had the most try-scorers with 39 different players scoring. Both Samoa and Scotland have had 8 try-scorers each, making them the 'fourth nations' with the most players scoring.

Tries scored	Name
11	Jason Nightingale (New Zealand), Ryan Hall (England)
10	Greg Inglis (Australia)
9	Brett Morris (Australia), Cooper Cronk (Australia)
8	Billy Slater (Australia)
7	
6	Sam Tomkins (England), Sam Perrett (New Zealand), Junior Sa'u (New Zealand)
5	Michael Jennings (Australia), Lance Hohaia (New Zealand), Darius Boyd (Australia), Johnathan Thurston (Australia)
4	Luke Lewis (Australia), Cameron Smith (Australia), Brent Tate (Australia), Sam Burgess (England), Tony Clubb (England), Shaun Kenny-Dowall (New Zealand), Blake Ferguson (Australia), Josh Dugan (Australia), Gerard Beale (New Zealand)
3	Darren Lockyer (Australia), Josh Morris (Australia), Willie Tonga (Australia), Peter Fox (England), Luke Robinson (England), Sika Manu (New Zealand), Manu Vatuvei (New Zealand), Daniel Vidot (Samoa), Gareth Widdop (England), Jermaine McGillvary (England), Shaun Johnson (New Zealand), Jordan Rapana (New Zealand), Josh Mansour (Australia)
2	Daly Cherry-Evans (Australia), Ben Hunt (Australia), Chris Lawrence (Australia), Tony Williams (Australia), Jharal Yow Yeh (Australia) Tom Briscoe (England), Chris Heighington (England), Richard Myler (England), Jack Reed (England), Lee Smith (England), Kallum Watkins (England), Elliott Whitehead (England), Liam Farrell (England) Nathan Fien (New Zealand), Bryson Goodwin (New Zealand), Benji Marshall (New Zealand), Frank-Paul Nuuausala (New Zealand), Frank Pritchard (New Zealand), Jeremy Smith (New Zealand), Jared Waerea-Hargreaves (New Zealand), David Fusitu'a (New Zealand), Jordan Kahu (New Zealand) Pita Godinet (Samoa), Elliot Kear (Wales), Emmanuel Yere (Papua New Guinea)
1	Paul Gallen (Australia), Jarryd Hayne (Australia), David Klemmer (Australia), Sione Mata'utia (Australia), Josh Papalii (Australia), Beau Scott (Australia), Matthew Scott (Australia), Sam Thaiday (Australia), Lote Tuqiri (Australia), Akuila Uate (Australia), James Maloney (Australia), Tyson Frizell (Australia), Michael Morgan (Australia), Jake Trbojevic (Australia), Matt Gillett (Australia), Valentine Holmes (Australia), Trent Merrin (Australia), Boyd Cordner (Australia) Josh Charnley (England), Kyle Eastmond (England), Gareth Ellis (England), James Roby (England), James Graham (England), Michael Shenton (England), Kevin Sinfield (England), Joel Tomkins (England), Kirk Yeaman (England), Ben Harrison (England), Mark Percival (England), Luke Gale (England) Kane Bentley (France), Vincent Duport (France), Olivier Elima (France), Sébastien Martins (France), James Wynne (France) Lewis Brown (New Zealand), Greg Eastwood (New Zealand), Kalifa Faifai Loa (New Zealand), Kieran Foran (New Zealand), Issac Luke (New Zealand), Kevin Locke, Simon Mannering (New Zealand), Ben Matulino (New Zealand), Kevin Proctor (New Zealand), Dean Whare (New Zealand), Solomone Kata (New Zealand) Macali Aizue (Papua New Guinea), Glen Nami (Papua New Guinea) David Fa'alogo (Samoa), Joseph Leilua (Samoa), Isaac Liu (Samoa), Tautau Moga (Samoa), Ben Roberts (Samoa), Tim Simona (Samoa), Antonio Winterstein (Samoa) Jordan James (Wales), Rhys Williams (Wales) Ryan Brierley (Scotland), Ben Kavanagh (Scotland), Kane Linnett (Scotland), Matty Russell (Scotland), Dale Ferguson (Scotland), Lewis Tierney (Scotland), Ben Hellewell (Scotland), Euan Aitken (Scotland)

=== Top pointscorers ===
The five highest overall points-scorers are goal-kickers with Johnathan Thurston being top, having scored 126 points; 106 of these points have come from 53 goals. The highest points-scorers who are not goal kickers are Jason Nightingale and Ryan Hall who have both scored 44 points from 11 tries and are the joint sixth highest points scorers.

Overall Four Nations Tournament Top Point-Scorers
	Player	Team	T	G	FG	Pts
1	Johnathan Thurston	Australia	5	53	0	126
2	Cameron Smith	Australia	4	26	0	68
3	Kevin Sinfield	England	1	27	0	58
=	Benji Marshall	New Zealand	2	25	0	58
5	Gareth Widdop	England	3	18	0	48
6	Jason Nightingale	New Zealand	11	0	0	44
=	Ryan Hall	England	11	0	0	44
8	Greg Inglis	Australia	10	0	0	40
9	Brett Morris	Australia	9	0	0	36
=	Cooper Cronk	Australia	9	0	0	36
11	Shaun Johnson	New Zealand	3	11	1	35
12	Bryson Goodwin	New Zealand	2	13	0	34
13	Billy Slater	Australia	8	0	0	32
14	Sam Tomkins	England	6	0	0	24
=	Sam Perrett	New Zealand	6	0	0	24
=	Junior Sau	New Zealand	6	0	0	24

== See also ==
- Rugby League Tri-Nations
- Rugby League World Cup
