= Peter Leitch (businessman) =

New Zealand businessman

Sir Peter Leitch KNZM QSM
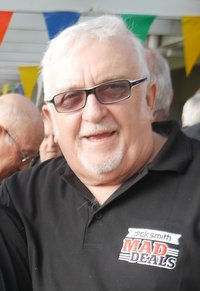
- Leitch in 2015
- Born: Peter Charles Leitch; 8 May 1944 (age 82); Wellington, New Zealand
- Other name: The Mad Butcher
- Occupation: Businessman
- Known for: "The Mad Butcher" butchery chain, charity and fundraising work, and promotion of rugby league
- Spouse: Janice (c. 1968–present)
- Children: Two
- Website: www.sirpeterleitch.co.nz

Sir Peter Charles Leitch KNZM QSM (born 8 May 1944), also known as the Mad Butcher, is a New Zealand businessman. Leitch founded a chain of butcheries, and is currently brand ambassador for the company. Leitch is also well known for his charity fundraising work and his promotion of rugby league.

== Early life ==
Leitch was born in Wellington in 1944. He left school at age 15 on account of dyslexia to work as a newspaper boy. He gained a job as a butcher's apprentice in a Seatoun butchery at the age of 16, before later moving to Auckland.

== Career ==
In 1971, he opened a butchery in Rosella Road, Māngere East. When a friend suggested a marketing gimmick for his radio advertising, Leitch recalled an incident at a pub in which someone referred to him as "that fucking mad butcher", hence his butchery became "the home of the Mad Butcher". In 2012, "The Mad Butcher" butchery chain had 36 stores from Whangarei to Dunedin.

Leitch is known for his work for charity and for his enthusiastic support of New Zealand rugby league, the Mangere East Hawks and the Warriors, which has increased the sport's profile in New Zealand. He managed the Kiwi's victorious Tri-Nations campaign in late 2005. In recognition of his support of the Warriors the club have retired the #19 jersey in his honour. The Mad Butcher Suburban Newspapers Community Trust is a fundraising vehicle he helped create to benefit charities. Leitch is chairman of the trust, and the deputy chairman is David Penny, general manager of Fairfax Media Suburban Newspapers Auckland. He has also fundraised for Allergy New Zealand, Diabetes Auckland, the Prostate Cancer Foundation and Macular Degeneration New Zealand.

He was voted the 41st most influential New Zealander by Listener Magazine in 2004. He has a memorable way of talking, not unlike an auctioneer, that has caused various spoofs of 'The Mad Butcher' that included the Radio Hauraki character 'The Bad Mutcher' on the Morning Pirates and Pulp Sport formerly had a character named 'The Mad Mad Butcher'. In his frequent radio advertisements, his voice rises to put the major stress and volume on the 99 cents which ends the price of each meat item advertised.

In the 1991 Queen's Birthday Honours, Leitch was awarded the Queen's Service Medal for community service. In the 2010 Queen's Birthday Honours, Leitch was appointed a Knight Companion of the New Zealand Order of Merit for services to business and philanthropy.

Later that year he featured on the TV One programme This is Your Life. In 2008, Leitch released his autobiography "What a Ride, Mate!: the Life and Times of the Mad Butcher", co-authored with Phil Gifford.

2008 was also the first year that the Peter Leitch QSM Challenge Trophy was contested. In 2011 he was made patron of the New Zealand Rugby League, replacing Helen Clark.

In 2010, Leitch was inducted into the New Zealand Business Hall of Fame.

In January 2017, a Māori resident of Waiheke Island posted a video on Facebook claiming that Leitch had racially abused her while she was on a wine tasting tour on the island. Leitch agreed that during the exchange he told her that Waiheke "is a white man's island also", but says his comments were misinterpreted and that it was merely banter. After initially saying that Leitch was the "least racist person I know", New Zealand race relations commissioner Susan Devoy later condemned Leitch's comments as casual racism.

== Personal life ==
Leitch has a long association with Waiheke Island and has owned several houses there. By June 2024 Leitch and his wife Janice had moved from their house on Waiheke Island to a retirement village in Auckland, although they retained their house there.
