= Bronson Harrison =

New Zealand international rugby league footballer

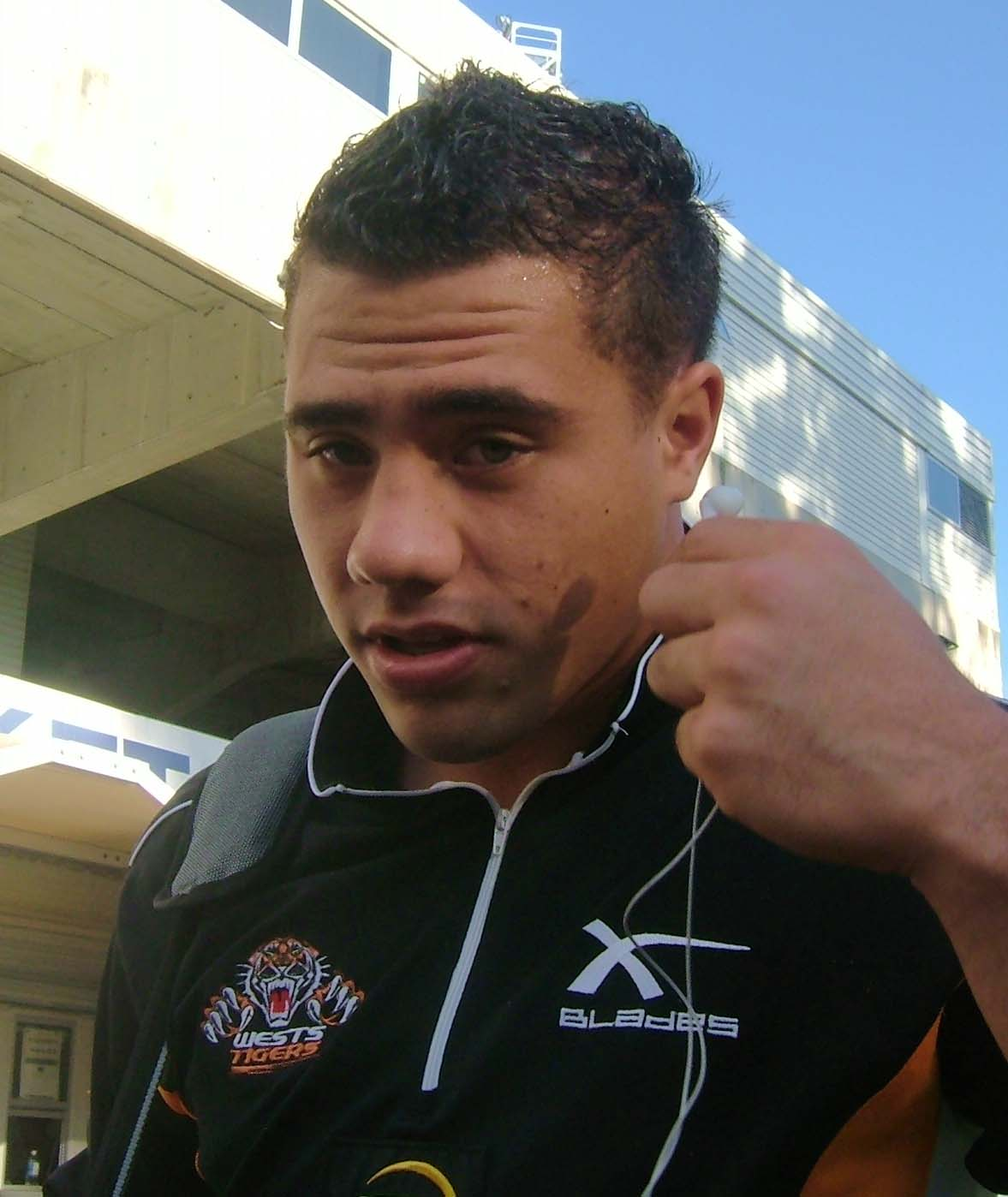

Personal information
- Full name: Bronson Lee Harrison
- Born: 10 October 1985 (age 41) Auckland, New Zealand

Playing information
- Height: 183 cm (6 ft 0 in)
- Weight: 103 kg (16 st 3 lb)
- Position: Second-row
Club
Years	Team	Pld	T	G	FG	P
2004–08	Wests Tigers	80	10	0	0	40
2009–12	Canberra Raiders	83	11	0	0	44
2013–14	St. George Illawarra	34	1	0	0	4
	Total	197	22	0	0	88
Representative
Years	Team	Pld	T	G	FG	P
2005–11	New Zealand	13	1	0	0	4

Bronson Harrison (born 10 October 1985) is a New Zealand former professional rugby league footballer who played as a second-row forward in the 2000s and 2010s. He played for the Wests Tigers, Canberra Raiders and the St. George Illawarra Dragons in the NRL and represented the New Zealand Kiwis at international level, being a part of the 2008 World Cup winning squad.

== Biography ==
=== Background ===
Harrison was born in Auckland, New Zealand,

He played his junior football for Five Dock and the Leichhardt Wanderers before being signed by the Wests Tigers.

=== Professional playing career ===
==== Wests Tigers ====
Harrison made his NRL debut for the Wests Tigers in Round 4 of the 2004 NRL season against the North Queensland Cowboys. As NRL Premiers, Wests faced Super League champions Bradford Bulls in the 2006 World Club Challenge. Harrison played from the interchange bench in the Tigers' 30–10 loss.

On 25 September 2008, although contracted to the Wests Tigers for a further season, Harrison was released and signed a 3-year deal with the Canberra Raiders.

==== Canberra Raiders ====
He joined the Raiders in 2009. After 2 years with the Raiders, Harrison was given the chance to co-captain 5 games in the 2011 season. On 14 November 2012, Harrison signed a 2-year contract with the St. George Illawarra Dragons starting in 2013, after being released from the final year of his Raiders contract.

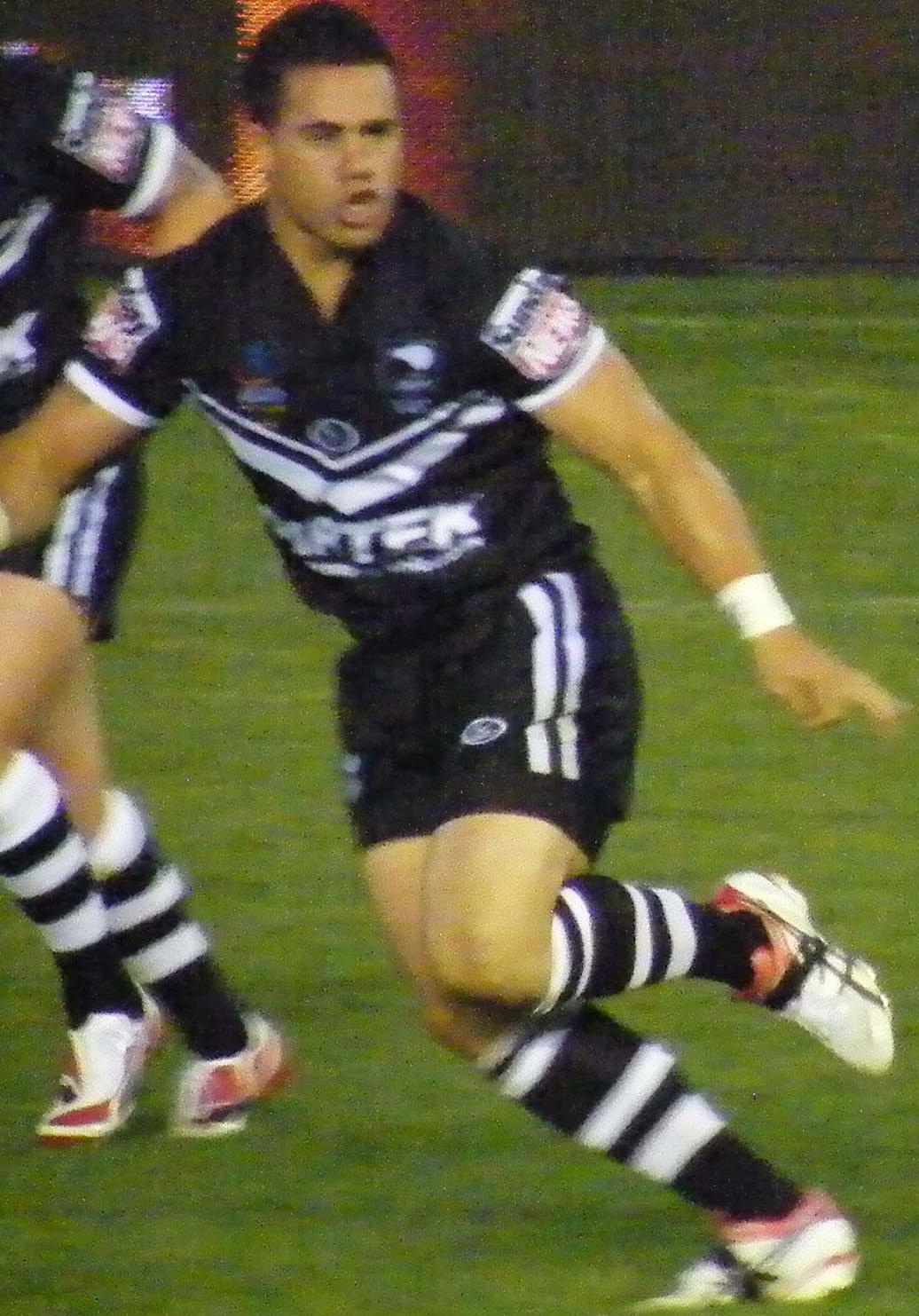
Harrison playing for New Zealand in 2008

==== St George Illawarra Dragons ====
The 2013 NRL season was Harrison's first with St George Illawarra Dragons.

In 2014, Harrison became an Australian Apprenticeships Ambassador for the Australian Government and is an Apprentice Mentor in the NRL's Trade UP With The NRL Program.

==== New Zealand ====
Harrison made his international debut for New Zealand in a test against France in 2005.

After missing out on the New Zealand national rugby league team 24-man squad for the 2008 Rugby League World Cup, Harrison played against the Kiwis for the New Zealand Māori in a warm up match. Following an injury to Brent Webb, Harrison was called in as a replacement in the New Zealand World Cup squad. He was a starting player in New Zealand's squad for the World Cup final victory over Australia.

Harrison was selected for the ANZAC Test and Four Nations in 2009, again being selected for both in 2010. For the 2010 Anzac Test, Harrison was selected to play for New Zealand at second-row forward in their loss against Australia. He was selected for the ANZAC Test in 2011 but after a disappointing year for the Raiders, missed out on the Four Nations squad that year.

== Statistics ==
Year	Team	Games	Tries	Pts
2004	Wests Tigers	12	1	4
2005	Wests Tigers	19	1	4
2006	Wests Tigers	6		
2007	Wests Tigers	23	4	16
2008	Wests Tigers	19	4	16
2009	Canberra Raiders	24	5	20
2010	Canberra Raiders	26	4	16
2011	Canberra Raiders	23	1	4
2012	Canberra Raiders	10	1	4
2013	St. George Illawarra Dragons	19	1	4
2014	St. George Illawarra Dragons	15		
	Totals	197	22	88
