= Alex Haija =

Papua New Guinean rugby league player

Playing information
Representative
Years	Team	Pld	T	G	FG	P
2010	Papua New Guinea	1	0	0	0	0

Alex Haija is a Papua New Guinean rugby league player. He played for the Kumuls in the 2010 Four Nations.
