= Rotorua International Stadium =

Stadium in Rotorua, New Zealand

- "The Hangi Pit"
- Interactive map of Rotorua International Stadium
- Location: Devon Street West, Rotorua, New Zealand
- Coordinates: 38°9′21″S 176°13′27″E
- Capacity: Rugby: 26,000; Concerts: 30,000

Construction
- Built: 1911

Tenants
- Bay of Plenty Rugby Union; Rotorua United; Chiefs

Rotorua International Stadium is a multi-purpose stadium located on Devon Street West in the Westbrook suburb of Rotorua, New Zealand. It is currently used mostly for rugby union and rugby league matches, being one of three home stadiums for the Bay of Plenty Rugby Union (the others being Baypark Stadium and Tauranga Domain in Tauranga).

In addition, a softball field is sited at the northern end.

The stadium has a capacity of 26,000 people. The stadium was originally built in 1911, and renovated several times since. The stadium features a covered stand seating up to 5,000 with a concrete seating area on the western side of the field.

In rugby union the stadium has been used for the 1987 Rugby World Cup 3rd/4th playoff, Test matches and British and Irish Lions tours matches. To many it is considered the rightful home of Bay of Plenty rugby, despite the recent majority of home matches being scheduled in Tauranga.

Rotorua International Stadium has hosted four rugby league Test matches. The first, held on 16 July 1989 saw the Wally Lewis led Australians defeat New Zealand 8–0 in front of 26,000 fans. This remains the highest attendance at the venue for any sport. The second Test was held seven years later when New Zealand defeated Papua New Guinea 62–8 in front of only 4,800 fans on 5 October 1996. The last rugby league international held at the venue as of 2020 was when the Kiwis defeated the PNG Kumuls 76–12 in front of 6,000 fans. This match was played as part of the 2010 Rugby League Four Nations tournament.

The stadium hosted three matches of the 2011 Rugby World Cup. The first game on 10 September saw Fiji defeat Namibia 49–25 in front of 10,100. Game two saw Samoa defeat Namibia 49–12 in front of 12,752 fans, while the final game at the stadium saw Ireland defeat Russia 62–12 in front of 25,661 fans.

In 2023 the stadium will host the annual NRL pre season NRL All Stars match

== Rugby league test matches ==
List of rugby league test and World Cup matches played at Rotorua International Stadium.

Test#	Date	Result	Attendance	Notes
1	16 July 1989	Australia def. New Zealand 8–0	26,000	1989 Trans-Tasman Test series – 2nd Test; First rugby league international played in Rotorua
2	5 October 1996	New Zealand def. Papua New Guinea 62–8	4,800	
3	14 October 2009	New Zealand def. Tonga 42–24	8,000	
4	30 October 2010	New Zealand def. Papua New Guinea 76–12	6,000	2010 Four Nations – Round 2, Game 1
