= George Moni =

PNG international rugby league footballer

Personal information
- Full name: George Moni
- Born: 23 June 1987 (age 38)
- Height: 6 ft 4 in (192 cm)
- Weight: 16 st 12 lb (107 kg)

Playing information
- Position: Prop, Second-row
Club
Years	Team	Pld	T	G	FG	P
2008–11	Agmark Rabaul Gurias	32	12	0	0	48
Representative
Years	Team	Pld	T	G	FG	P
2006–10	PNG Prime Minister's XIII	4	0	0	0	0
2008–10	Papua New Guinea	8	0	0	0	0
- Source: RLP As of 9 November 2023

George Moni is a professional rugby league footballer who plays for M & J Muruks in Papua New Guinea. He is a Papua New Guinea international.

He has been named in the Papua New Guinea training squad for the 2008 Rugby League World Cup.

He has been named in the PNG squad for the 2008 Rugby League World Cup.

He played for Papua New Guinea in the 2010 Four Nations tournament.
