= Joseph Pombo =

PNG international rugby league footballer

Personal information
- Born: Mendi, Papua New Guinea

Playing information
- Position: Prop
Representative
| Years | Team | Pld | T | G | FG | P |
|---|---|---|---|---|---|---|
| 2010 | PNG Prime Minister's XIII | 1 | 0 | 0 | 0 | 0 |
| 2001–10 | Papua New Guinea | 2 | 0 | 0 | 0 | 0 |
- Source: RLP As of 27 March 2023

Joseph Pombo (born in Mendi, Papua New Guinea) is a professional rugby league footballer who currently plays for the Halswell Hornets in the Canterbury Rugby League. He is a Papua New Guinea international.

== Playing career ==
Pombo first started playing rugby league in his native Papua New Guinea before moving to New Zealand in 2004. Pombo plays for the Halswell Hornets club in the Canterbury Rugby League and was a Canterbury Bulls representative between 2006 and 2009.

In 2010 he was picked for a Canterbury A side to trial against the South Island team but declined.

== Representative career ==
Pombo first represented Papua New Guinea in 2001. He did not play again for the national side until he was picked in the squad for the 2010 Four Nations.
