= Michael Mark (rugby league) =

PNG international rugby league footballer

Personal information
- Born: 14 December 1988 (age 37) Papua New Guinea

Playing information
- Position: Wing
Club
Years	Team	Pld	T	G	FG	P
2009–10	Hunslet Hawks
Representative
Years	Team	Pld	T	G	FG	P
2007–10	PNG Prime Minister's XIII	3	0	0	0	0
2007–10	Papua New Guinea	6	0	0	0	0
- Source: As of 9 November 2023

Michael Mark (born 14 December 1988) is a Papua New Guinean rugby league footballer who represented Papua New Guinea.

== Playing career ==
Mark played for the Port Moresby Bulldogs and Masta Mark Rangers before being selected to play for Papua New Guinea in test matches against Wales and France in 2007. He played for the PNG Residents in 2008, before joining the Hunslet Hawks in 2009. He played in three matches for Papua New Guinea in the 2010 Rugby League Four Nations. He is the uncle of Melbourne Storm Centre Justin Olam.
