= Benji Marshall =

New Zealand rugby coach & footballer (born 1985)

Benji Marshall CNZM
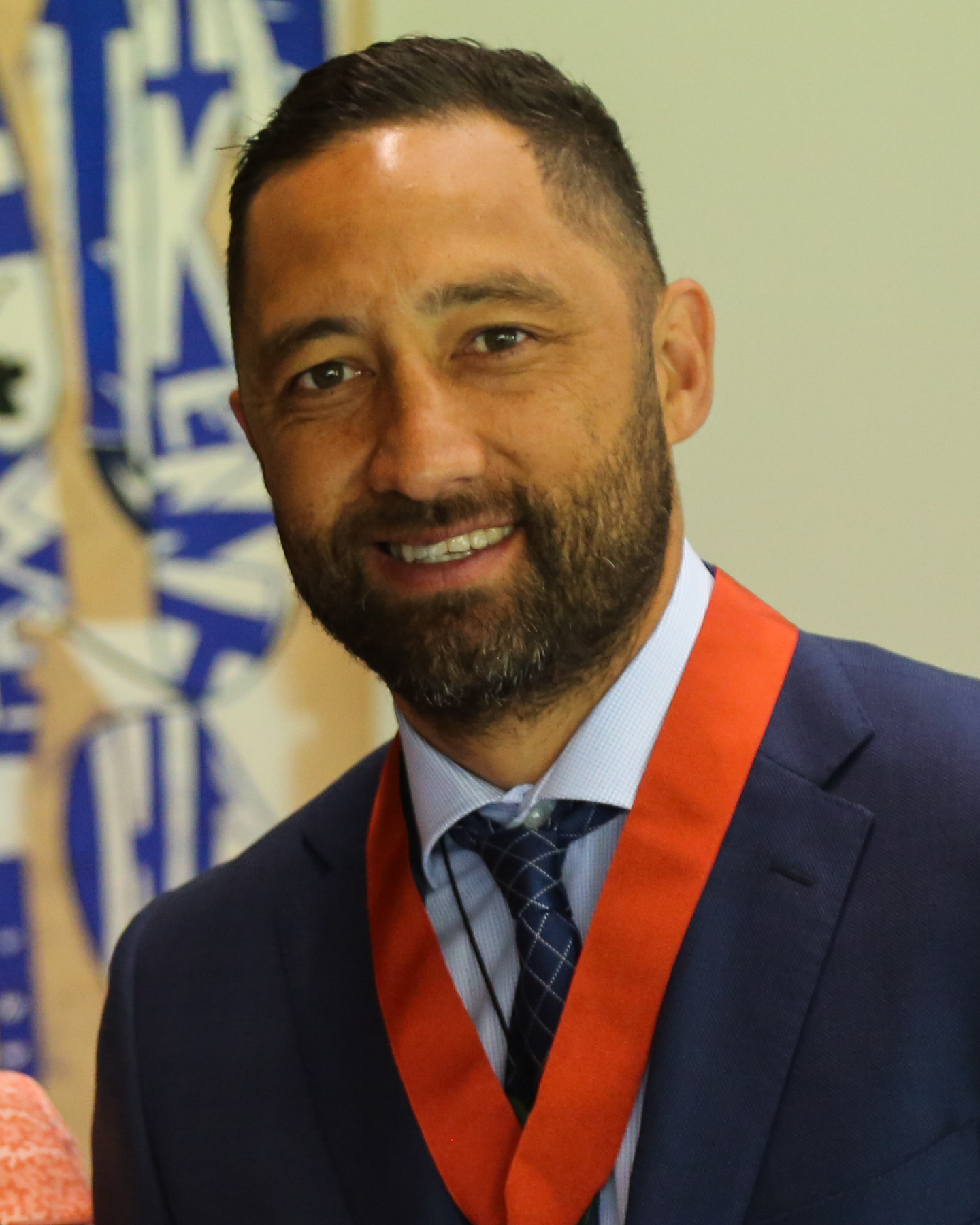

Personal information
- Full name: Benjamin Quentin Marshall
- Born: 25 February 1985 (age 41) Whakatāne, New Zealand

Playing information
- Height: 183 cm (6 ft 0 in)
- Weight: 91 kg (14 st 5 lb)

Rugby league
- Position: Five-eighth, Halfback
Club
Years	Team	Pld	T	G	FG	P
2003–13	Wests Tigers	201	76	402	10	1118
2014–16	St. George Illawarra	54	8	0	3	35
2017	Brisbane Broncos	13	1	0	0	4
2018–20	Wests Tigers	56	8	14	3	63
2021	South Sydney	22	3	0	0	12
	Total	346	96	416	16	1232
Representative
Years	Team	Pld	T	G	FG	P
2005–19	New Zealand	31	9	35	0	106
2010–13	NRL All Stars	4	1	8	0	20
2021	Māori All Stars	1	0	0	0	0

Rugby union
- Position: Fly-half / Fullback
Club
Years	Team	Pld	T	G	FG	P
2014	Blues	6	1	2	0	9

Coaching information
Club
Years	Team	Gms	W	D	L	W%
2024–	Wests Tigers	72	23	0	49	32
- Relatives: Jeremy Marshall-King (brother)

Benjamin Quentin Marshall CNZM (born 25 February 1985) is a New Zealand professional rugby league coach who is the head coach of the Wests Tigers in the NRL and a former rugby league footballer.

He played at five-eighth or halfback for the Wests Tigers in two separate spells, St. George Illawarra Dragons, Brisbane Broncos and South Sydney Rabbitohs in the National Rugby League (NRL), and at representative level for the NRL All Stars and New Zealand Kiwis.

Marshall was also briefly a professional rugby union player with the Blues in Super Rugby.

Marshall played for fourteen seasons in the NRL for Sydney club Wests Tigers, with whom he won the 2005 NRL Premiership. He has been noted for his flamboyant attack, including sidesteps, no-look passes and flick-passes. In 2010 Marshall won the Golden Boot Award for the best international player.

In 2022, Marshall signed a five-year deal to become an assistant coach of Wests Tigers under Tim Sheens, with Marshall succeeding Sheens as head coach ahead of 2025 season after Sheens' impending retirement.

== Early life ==
Marshall was born in Whakatāne, New Zealand. He is of Māori descent. He is the eldest of three brothers, and the elder brother of New Zealand Māori international Jeremy Marshall-King. He was raised without his biological father, but has spoken of the influence of his foster-father Michael Doherty, and other men within his extended family. He has said he had, "10 or 11 fathers ... which is not a bad thing."

Marshall attended Whakatane High School. He was offered a scholarship to play for Keebra Park State High School in Gold Coast, Queensland when he was 16. While living on the Gold Coast, he played junior rugby league for the Nerang Roosters. While in high school in Australia, Marshall played for the Australian Schoolboys team in 2003, and also represented Australia in touch football that same year. Although eligible to represent Australia, Marshall declared his allegiance to the New Zealand Kiwis early in his career.

== Rugby league career ==
=== Wests Tigers (2003–2013) ===
In Round 20 of the 2003 NRL season, Marshall made his NRL debut for the Wests Tigers against the Newcastle Knights, coming on as a replacement in the 14th minute as fullback. The Wests Tigers won the match 52–12 at Campbelltown Stadium. Marshall continued to make appearances for Wests Tigers for the remainder of 2003 when his studies allowed, playing halfback. In Round 24 against the Penrith Panthers, Marshall scored his first NRL try in the Tigers' 44–28 loss at Penrith Stadium. He scored one try from four appearances in his debut season.

In 2004, Marshall starred in the pre-season World Sevens competition helping the Wests Tigers to win the tournament. He began the season playing at centre until he dislocated his shoulder in Round 4 against the North Queensland Cowboys. During his time off the Tigers struggled in attack. When he returned after four weeks, he was moved to the play-making position of five-eighth. From there, Marshall set the club on a record 3 match winning streak. He dislocated the same shoulder four weeks into his return in Round 13. Marshall's season ended as he had surgery, finishing the year with 2 tries from 7 matches.

In 2005, Marshall injured his other shoulder in the opening minutes of the first trial match. After missing the opening round match, Marshall played five-eighth for the club's second match of the year against defending premiers, the Bulldogs. With an injury free run, Marshall demonstrated a passing, running, and kicking game to complement his stepping. He was able to score individual tries and set up tries for his team-mates. Marshall also made his New Zealand debut in the 2005 ANZAC Test. Marshall was a member of the Wests Tigers that defeated North Queensland Cowboys in the 2005 NRL grand final, where he famously set up a 90-metre try to Pat Richards, which was considered to be one of the best tries of grand final history. The try involved a trademark 'flick pass', at about the 50-metre line to Richards. Marshall was named as New Zealand five-eighth for the 2005 Tri Nations tour. However, surgery on his weak shoulder in the off-season ruled him out and he also missed the 2006 World Club Challenge.

"Benji equals anybody I've seen in terms of flair, and making something happen. He is a remarkable talent, born out of living on the edge. That's the way he is. He was made to be a footballer."

-Wayne Bennett

Marshall made his comeback from surgery against St George Illawarra in round 1, but broke his cheek bone. He played the rest of the match and set up the winning try.

Making his comeback against the Cowboys, in the 79th minute he was injured by Cowboys prop Carl Webb. He popped his shoulder out but recovered in three weeks, playing for New Zealand in the ANZAC test. Eight weeks into his come-back he dislocated the same shoulder that had been dislocated against North Queensland, and he missed the rest of the season.

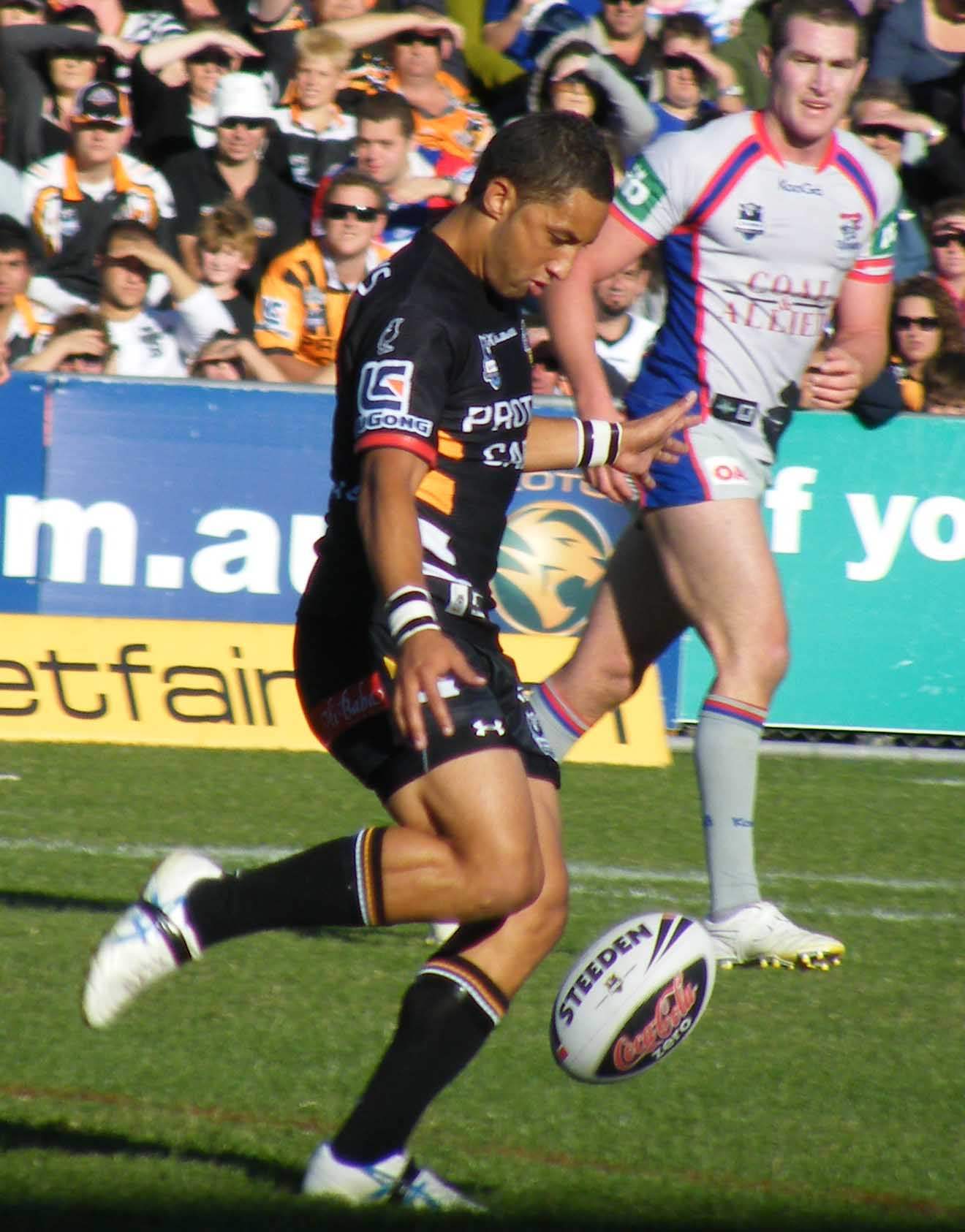
Marshall kicking the ball in a match against the Newcastle Knights.

In 2007, Marshall again made his comeback from injury against the Melbourne Storm in Round 1. Marshall had to adapt to changes within the team such as the departure of halfback, Scott Prince, and the added responsibility of goal kicking while fullback, Brett Hodgson, was recovering from a knee injury. The Daily Telegraph later said, "Marshall had to become something else, he had to become an organiser, a dictator, a tactician. This never came naturally to him but he made himself into that type of player because he had to do it."

Marshall was selected to play for New Zealand at five-eighth in the 2007 ANZAC test, kicking one goal in the 6–30 loss. In round 8, Marshall sustained a fractured shoulder in a tackle where his arm was jammed between Melbourne's Israel Folau and the Tigers' Taniela Tuiaki, and didn't return until round 20. Following the season, he missed the Centenary Trans-Tasman Test due to injury and also missed the Kiwis' Tour of Great Britain and France.

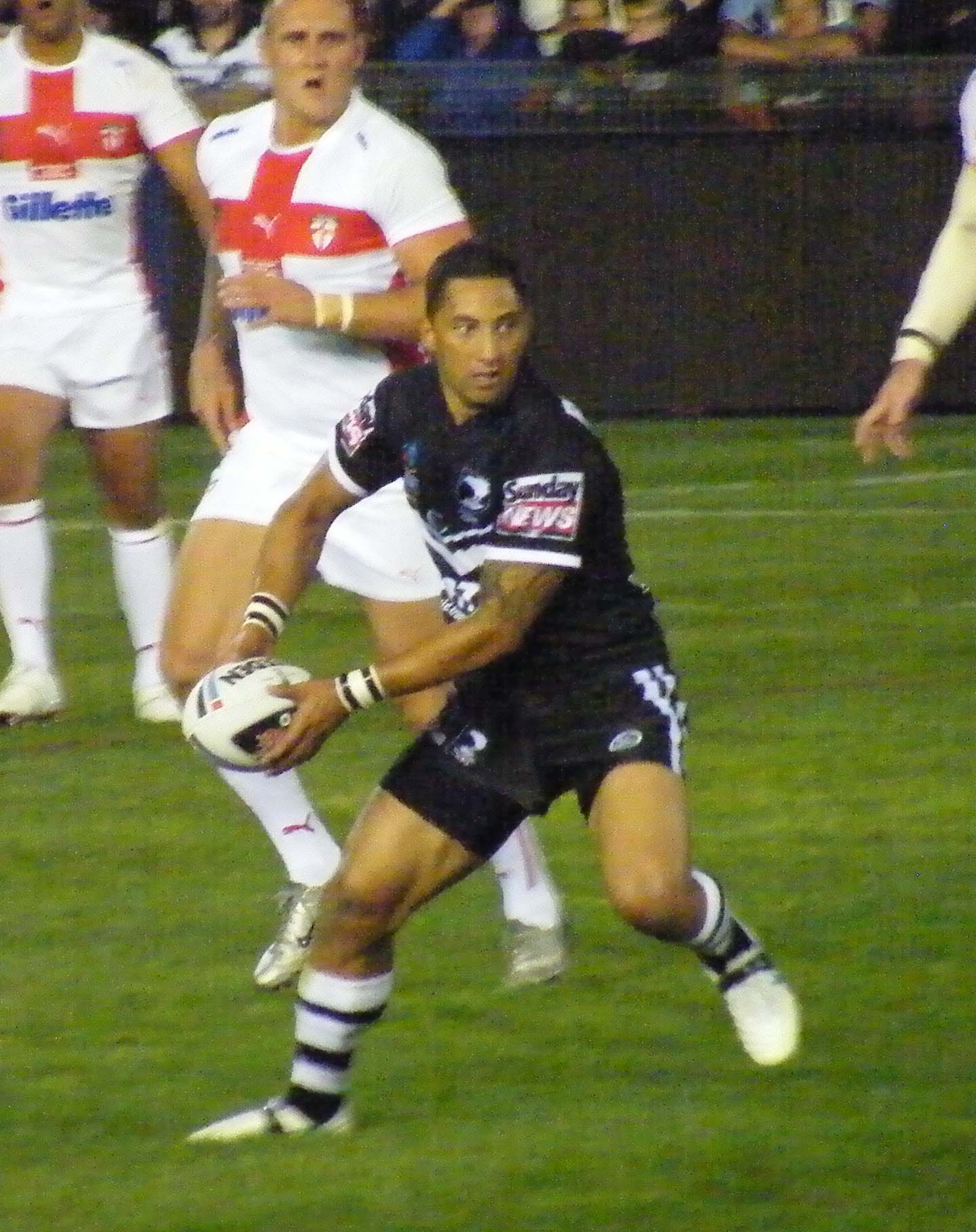
Marshall against England at the 2008 RLWC

In 2008, Marshall's injury troubles continued when he suffered a knee ligament tear in the third minute of the season's opening game. He returned in round 7. Halfway through 2008, coach Tim Sheens' announced his plan to move Marshall to the halfback position during the 2009 season, going as far as encouraging New Zealand coach Stephen Kearney to play Marshall in this role during the 2008 World Cup. The suggestion was declined.

Marshall was named in the 24-man Kiwis squad for the World Cup. He captained New Zealand for the first time on 8 November, against England. Marshall scored a try and kicked two conversions in the World Cup final victory over the Kangaroos. It was the Kiwis first ever World Cup victory, in a game they were considered "massive underdogs".

In round one of the 2009 season, Marshall started at halfback alongside John Morris at five-eighth. By the third round of the season, Marshall began to make an impact in his new role, helping the team to a 40–24 win over the Sydney Roosters.

In March, despite speculation that he might play rugby union in Japan, Marshall signed with the Wests Tigers for a further two seasons through to the end of 2011. Following Kiwis captain Nathan Cayless' retirement from international football, Marshall was named as captain in that year's ANZAC test.

Marshall returned to his old position of five-eighth from July, though both Marshall and coach Tim Sheens insisted that Marshall had been switching between first and second receiver throughout the entire season. He went on to be named at 5/8 in the Team of the Year as chosen by The Rugby League International Federation.

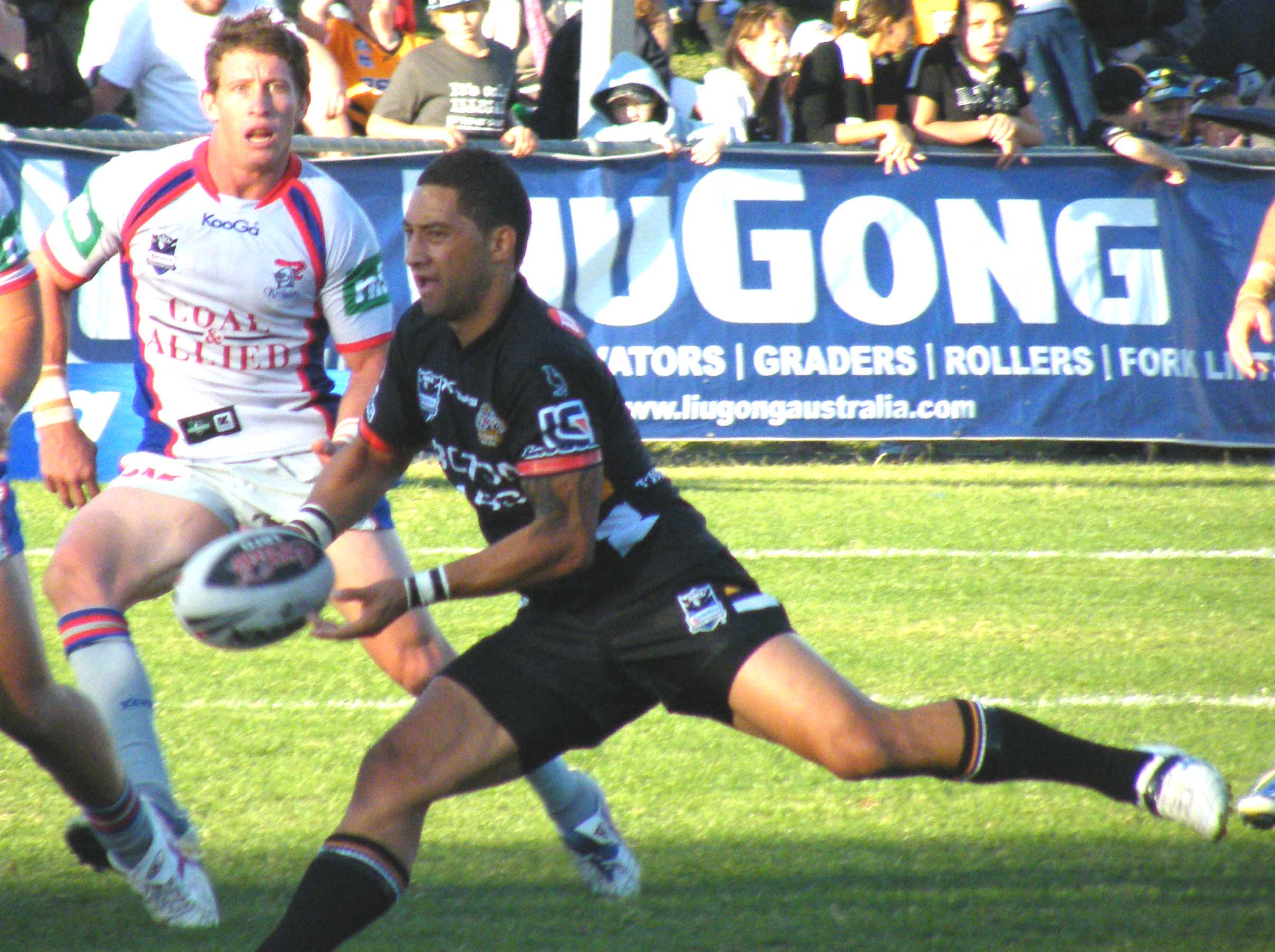
Marshall running the ball in a match against the Newcastle Knights in 2009.

In early 2010, Marshall signed a further extension with the Tigers, to stay at the club until the end of the 2015 season, saying, "I just can't see myself as anything other than a one-club man." As captain of New Zealand, Marshall was an automatic selection for the NRL All Stars in 2010.

In March 2010, Marshall scored two tries against the Parramatta Eels to become the highest try-scorer for the Wests Tigers, breaking the record of 43 previously held by Daniel Fitzhenry. For the 2010 Anzac Test, he captained New Zealand at five-eighth in their loss against Australia. Later that year, in a match against the Titans, Marshall kicked a 51-metre-long field goal, considered to be the longest in NRL history. 2010 was the first season that Marshall had played without missing a game due to injury, and his form was thought to be close to his career-best. He played in 34 games in 2010, the most of any NRL player, including the Tigers' 13–12 loss in the preliminary final to the Dragons.

Marshall led the Kiwis to victory in the 2010 Four Nations tournament, setting up two late tries in what was described as, "perhaps the finest game of his life." He was then awarded the Rugby League World Golden Boot Award for international footballer of the year. Big League magazine named him one of the year's five top players.

As New Zealand captain, Marshall was again an automatic selection in the 2011 All Stars Match.

In March, Marshall was charged with assault after another man sustained a facial injury during an altercation with Marshall at a McDonald's restaurant in Sydney. In August, the judge dismissed the case, saying she had reasonable doubt that the injury was caused by Marshall.

In round 14 of the 2011 season, Marshall scored 2 tries against the New Zealand Warriors. He had then scored a try against every team in the NRL. Before the end of the season he had eclipsed Brett Hodgson as the highest scorer in the short history of the Wests Tigers, having amassed 797 points in 151 games. Marshall was the top point-scorer for the 2011 NRL season, winning the Dally M Five-Eighth of the Year and also placing second in the Dally M Player of the Year voting. After the post-season test against Australia in Newcastle, Marshall travelled to England with the Kiwis for the 2011 Four Nations tournament.

On 3 November 2011, The annual RLIF Awards dinner was held at the Tower of London and Marshall was named stand-off half back of the year.

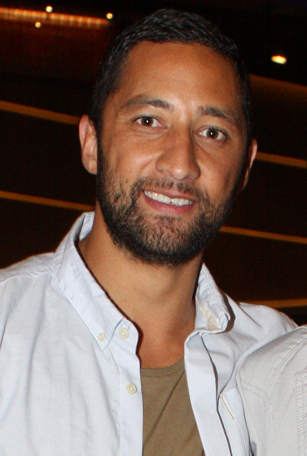
Marshall in 2012

Marshall captained the NRL All Stars team to victory in the inaugural Arthur Beetson trophy. He was one of the few players to appear in every Wests Tigers game for the year and, despite the club's poor showing, led the NRL in try assists and line-break assists in the regular season. With the departure of Robert Lui in the off-season, the club tried a number of players at halfback in 2012, before Marshall switched from five-eighth in May.

In the penultimate game of the regular season, Marshall kicked two goals to become the first Wests Tigers and 43rd player in the Australian competition to score one thousand points. At the end of the season he was nominated for the Dally M halfback of the year.

During the post-season Trans-Tasman Test 10–18 loss to Australia in Townsville, Marshall played his 20th game as New Zealand test captain, breaking the record for 'most capped captain' for the Kiwis previously held by Gary Freeman since 1995.

As the incumbent New Zealand national captain, Marshall was again selected to play in the 2013 NRL All Stars game. Weeks later, New Zealand coach Stephen Kearney announced that Marshall had been dropped as the team's captain. Marshall said, "It was the proudest moment of my career, captaining my country. I was lucky enough that I got to break the record for most caps as Kiwi captain. The decision was Steve's and the New Zealand Rugby League's, and it's just a decision I'm just going to have to live with."

By May, with the Wests Tigers on a losing streak, Marshall was dropped to the bench. Coach Mick Potter said, "We needed to change something around. We can't just keep doing what we've been doing and expect a result. Benji, as you could imagine, was disappointed. Disappointed is probably not hard enough." Marshall later admitted he was playing badly and without confidence. "This year, I've hardly taken the line on and I've hardly been tackled. Over the first six rounds I was barely contributing to the team," he said.

In July, Marshall sought a release from the remaining two years of his contract with Wests Tigers to pursue a career in rugby union, after the club declined to offer him a contract extension and upgrade that had been previously verbally agreed upon. He finished the remainder of the season before leaving, and left the Wests Tigers as the club's all-time top try and point scorer.

== Rugby union ==
=== Auckland Blues (2014) ===
In August Marshall entered negotiations with the Blues to play Super Rugby in New Zealand. He indicated his desire to play for the Auckland team, even if it meant a pay cut and the probability of starting on the bench.

Marshall signed a two-year deal with the Auckland franchise worth close to $500,000 a season, announced via Blues official YouTube channel, with Marshall wearing the Blues jumper while still signed with Wests Tigers. Blues coach Sir John Kirwan hinted that number 10 (first five-eighth), not 15 (fullback), may be Marshall's ideal position. Marshall later said, "I'm a little bit dirty on myself for the way I left. I could've done things a lot better. I know that. The whole Auckland Blues jumper fiasco. The disrespect of doing that. I didn't know it at the time, and people around me were telling me to do it. I was dumb enough to listen."

In February 2014, Marshall made his Super Rugby debut for the Blues against the Highlanders at Forsyth Barr Stadium in Dunedin coming on off the bench in the 59th minute playing at fullback which resulted in a re-shuffle with Charles Piutau shifting to the centres. In his debut game he set up a line-break assist to Peter Saili, which led to a try to Patrick Tuipulotu. However, the Blues end-up losing 21–29.

On 15 March 2014, Marshall made his first appearance at fullback for the Blues for the clash against the South African team, the Lions at Ellis Park Stadium in Johannesburg. During the game, he scored his first Super Rugby try in the second half of the game (in the 80th minute). He made 10 runs (130 metres), 2 line-breaks, 3 Offloads and 2 Try-Assists – setting up a try to team outside-backs Frank Halai (in the 65th minute) and George Moala (in the 71st minute). Unfortunately, the Blues end-up losing 36–39. Despite the loss, Marshall made a couple of great touches with the ball and produce a strong performance in the game. Following round 5 (of the 2014 Super Rugby Season), Marshall was named at Fullback in the Fox-Sports' Round 5 Super Rugby 'Team of the week'.

On 23 April 2014, having made just one start and six appearances, Marshall was released from his contract with the Blues.

== Return to rugby league ==
=== St. George Illawarra Dragons (2014–2016) ===
On 9 May 2014, Marshall signed a 2 1/2-year contract with the St George Illawarra Dragons. He finished the year playing in 15 games and scoring 3 tries.

In 2015, Marshall steered the Dragons to their first NRL finals series since coach Wayne Bennett left the club at the end of the 2011 season. The Dragons were defeated in golden point extra time by the Bulldogs in the first elimination final with Marshall being forced from the field in the second half with an ankle injury.

Marshall finished equal second in the Dally M medal count, behind Johnathan Thurston, who won the People's Choice award, along with the Player of the Year and Halfback of the Year.

On 24 July, Marshall played his 250th NRL game, playing against his former club Wests Tigers. Marshall had been set to play game number 250 the weekend earlier against the Gold Coast Titans, before a troublesome hamstring pushed it back a week. Benji ran out in his 250th game in the Red V of St George, meaning that he ended up playing a major milestone match against a team he played most of his career with.

=== Brisbane Broncos (2017) ===
After rejecting a one-year extension worth $300,000, Marshall decided to reunite with Wayne Bennett and sign with the Brisbane Broncos on a one-year deal. Marshall later said, "I had nowhere to go so I called him and he just said, 'come to Brisbane'. He talked to me about just enjoying the game again, which I had lost. I've just been trying to do that ever since." He played in 13 games for them, sometimes covering injured or representative players, and sometimes playing as a utility off the bench.

=== Return to Wests Tigers (2018–2020) ===
Marshall signed a deal in August 2017 to go back to his first club The Wests Tigers for one year. With the departure of Aaron Woods, Marshall was named as one of 5 co-captains at Wests Tigers, alongside Chris Lawrence, Elijah Taylor, Russell Packer and Josh Reynolds. Coach Ivan Cleary said, "I just think it's the right model for us right now. When we started this preseason it was pretty obvious straight away that there was no real pecking order. There was no set culture to adhere to. It was all new." With the role rotating, Marshall made his return as on-field captain in round 3.

Named on the bench for his return in round 1, Marshall got a call-up to five-eighth after a late injury to Josh Reynolds, and was said to play a "central role" in the surprise victory over eventual premiers the Sydney Roosters. Marshall said, "I'm just enjoying being back in this No.6 jersey and I'm going to give my all every week to try and stay in it. If that happens I'll be pretty happy. I thought my career was coming to an end so to get this opportunity is a dream come true for me." With Reynolds suffering further injuries, Marshall made 21 appearances for the season as Wests' missed out on the finals, finishing in 9th position.

Marshall's contract renewal for 2019 was announced at the same time as long-time teammate Robbie Farah. Farah said, "Once he texted me late last night to tell me he was staying on again, it relieved the nerves, to be honest. To know he was there for another year – the two old boys at the club – it made me feel a lot better."

Marshall was selected to represent the New Zealand Kiwis for their matchup against Tonga on 22 June. He started as halfback, pairing with Shaun Johnson for a much anticipated halves combination. This was his first appearance for the Kiwis in seven years, and also his return to captaincy. They won the game 34–14.

Marshall made 19 appearances for the Wests Tigers in the 2019 NRL season as the club finished ninth on the table and missed out on the finals. The year also saw Marshall put in a number of strong performances.

At the end of the regular season, Marshall captained New Zealand in two further tests, breaking the record for most matches as captain for them at 22. Wayne Bennett said, "I think it is great what the coach has done in bringing him back because he brings so much. They all get older, there's no doubt about that but they don't lose their skill level, they don't lose their commitment, they might lose a yard of speed but that's about all."

After the first game of the season, Fox Sports had a headline, "Benji Marshall is the second oldest player in the NRL. He's not playing like it." Finishing the game with one try, two try assists, and returning to the goal-kicking role for the first time since leaving Wests Tigers in 2013, Marshall said, "I am actually proud of myself that I am still playing. There was a pretty tough patch there when I thought I was going to have to retire, especially when I went to Brisbane." On 8 August, in round 13 of the season, Marshall and fellow Wests Tigers teammate Chris Lawrence played their 250th games for the Tigers in a 44–4 loss against the Newcastle Knights.

Towards the back end of the season, Marshall was informed by Wests that he was not part of their plans going into the 2021 season. In round 20, he played his final game for the club against Parramatta. Marshall was taken from the field early in the first half with a rib injury and did not return as Wests lost 28–24 at Bankwest Stadium.

=== South Sydney Rabbitohs (2021) ===
On 29 January, Marshall signed a one-year contract with the South Sydney Rabbitohs. He made his debut for them in round 1 in a 26–18 loss against Melbourne.

In round 5 against Brisbane, he scored his first try for South Sydney in a 35–6 victory at Stadium Australia, and in round 7, he scored two tries for South Sydney in a 40–30 victory over the Gold Coast, playing at centre.

Marshall played a total of 22 games for South Sydney in the 2021 NRL season including the club's 2021 NRL Grand Final defeat against Penrith. Following the NRL premiership decider, Marshall announced his retirement on 6 October. He then signed a two-year contract with Fox Sports to work as an analyst/pundit. Marshall later said, "I actually wasn't going to retire. I had literally agreed verbally to go to the Gold Coast for two more years to keep playing. Wayne sat me down and goes 'What a way to go out on a grand final. What else have you got to prove in the game?' I thought 'he's right' and for me, I don't want to keep moving my family. I knew before the grand final that I was retiring. I just didn't tell anyone."

In the 2022 Queen's Birthday and Platinum Jubilee Honours, Marshall was appointed a Companion of the New Zealand Order of Merit, for services to rugby league.

== Coaching career ==
In 2022, it was announced that Marshall would be appointed the Tigers' assistant coach under long-time head coach Tim Sheens, with the original plan being an assistant coach for the 2023 and 2024 NRL seasons, which would see him take over the head coaching role in the 2025 season after Sheens' retirement.

However, due to the Tigers' poor 2023 season, the club mutually parted ways with Sheens in August, with Marshall moving into the head coach role a year earlier than expected. Marshall would assume the role in the Tigers' Round 25 match, where the Tigers would break a 10-game losing streak, defeating the Dolphins 24–22. The final 3 games of the 2023 NRL season officially do not count toward Marshall's coaching record, as Tim Sheens was still technically the head coach until the conclusion of the season.

=== Wests Tigers (2024–) ===
Marshall was announced as the new head coach for the Wests Tigers starting in 2024. Marshall earned his first win as head coach in round 3 of the 2024 NRL season against Cronulla. In Marshall's first season in charge of the club they would finish with the wooden spoon after managing to only win six games all year. In Marshall's second full season in charge, he guided Wests Tigers to a 13th-placed position on the table. In the 2026 NRL season, Marshall guided the Wests Tigers to a 15th-placed finish. After eight rounds, the club was sitting second on the table and it appeared that Marshall had finally turned the clubs fortunes around, however after round 8 the club would only win three games culminating in an eight match losing streak. The club also suffered humiliating losses along the way losing to Penrith 68-0, Canberra 56-10 and to Canterbury 32-0.

== Hall of Fame ==
In August 2024, the National Rugby League announced that Marshall was an inductee into the National Rugby League Hall of Fame. Marshall, who was ascribed Hall of Fame number 123, was amongst eleven male players in the 2024 Class.

== Media appearances ==
In 2022, Marshall competed on the sixth season of The Celebrity Apprentice Australia. On June 21, he was declared the winner of the series, raising over $487,000 for his chosen charity Souths Cares.

Preceded by Nathan Cayless	New Zealand national rugby league team captain 2009–13	Succeeded by Simon Mannering
