= Benjamin John =

PNG international rugby league & union footballer

Personal information
- Born: Papua New Guinea

Playing information

Rugby league
- Position: Halfback
Representative
Years	Team	Pld	T	G	FG	P
2007–10	Papua New Guinea	4	0	0	0	0
2009–10	PNG Prime Minister's XIII	2	0	0	0	0

Rugby union
Representative
Years	Team	Pld	T	G	FG	P
20??	Papua New Guinea 7s
- Source: As of 25 November 2023

Benjamin John is a Papua New Guinean rugby league and rugby union footballer who has played in the 2000s and 2010s. He has played representative rugby league (RL) for Papua New Guinea and at club level for the Parkes Spacemen and Bathurst St Patrick's, as a halfback, and representative rugby union (RU) at rugby union sevens for Papua New Guinea.

== Playing career ==
John played rugby league in the SP Inter-City Cup before switching to rugby union sevens and playing for Papua New Guinea on the Sevens World Series.

In 2010 John returned to rugby league and moved to Australia, playing for the Parkes Spacemen in the Group 11 Rugby League competition.

John first represented Papua New Guinea in rugby league in 2007 against France. In 2010 he was selected in the team that competed in the Four Nations, playing in all three matches.

In 2014 he played for Bathurst St Patrick's in the Group 10 Rugby League competition.
