= Nickson Kolo =

PNG international rugby league footballer

Personal information
- Born: 17 August 1985 (age 40); Mount Hagen, Papua New Guinea
- Height: 175 cm (5 ft 9 in)
- Weight: 97 kg (15 st 4 lb)

Playing information
- Position: Lock, Second-row, Prop
Club
Years	Team	Pld	T	G	FG	P
2006–07	Wari Vele Raiders	39	11	0	0	44
2008–09	Master Mak City Rangers	20	8	0	0	32
2010–11	Hela Wigmen	15	7	0	0	28
2012	Mt Hagen Eagles	6	4	0	0	16
2013–	Gulf Isapea	5	4	0	0	16
	Total	85	34	0	0	136
Representative
Years	Team	Pld	T	G	FG	P
2006–10	Papua New Guinea	20	5	0	0	20
2007–10	PNG Prime Minister's XIII	4	3	0	0	12
- Source: As of 9 November 2023

Nickson Kolo is a Papua New Guinean professional rugby league footballer, a blockbusting forward who plays for the newly formed club Gulf Isapeas in the Digicel Cup in Papua New Guinea, He is a former Papua New Guinea international.

He has represented Papua New Guinea in the Prime Minister's XIII games between Australia and PNG between 2007 and 2010. His trade mark, blockbusting runs had earned him a place in the Papua New Guinea training squad for the 2008 Rugby League World Cup.

He played for PNG in the 2008 Rugby League World Cup.

He has also played for Papua New Guinea in the 2010 Four Nations tournament in New Zealand and Australia.
