= David Loko =

Papua New Guinean former rugby league footballer

Personal information
- Born: 11 August 1990 (age 35) Papua New Guinea

Playing information
- Position: Second-row
Club
Years	Team	Pld	T	G	FG	P
	Snax Lae Tigers
2018–	Limoux Grizzlies	6	2	0	0	8
	Total	6	2	0	0	8
Representative
Years	Team	Pld	T	G	FG	P
2010	Papua New Guinea	2	0	0	0	0
2011–16	PNG Prime Minister's XIII	5	1	0	0	4
- Source: As of 9 November 2023

David Loko is a Papua New Guinean former rugby league footballer who played for the Limoux Grizzlies in the Elite One Championship in France and for Papua New Guinea in international level. His position is second row. He played for the Papua New Guinea national rugby league team in the 2010 Four Nations and was selected in the train-on side for the 2013 Rugby League World Cup. He first played with the Lorma Tarrangau in his local competition, the Ipatas Cup, then was selected to play with the Enga Mioks and went on to play for the Kumuls.

== Personal life ==
Loko works as a farmer in Papua New Guinea and as a fruit picker in Australia in 2018 while playing for the Fassifern Bombers in the Ipswich Regional Championship. He represented the kumuls at the Four Nations. He played for the PNG Hunters in 2017 Intrust Super Cup final where they won for the first time.
