= Charlie Wabo =

PNG international rugby league footballer

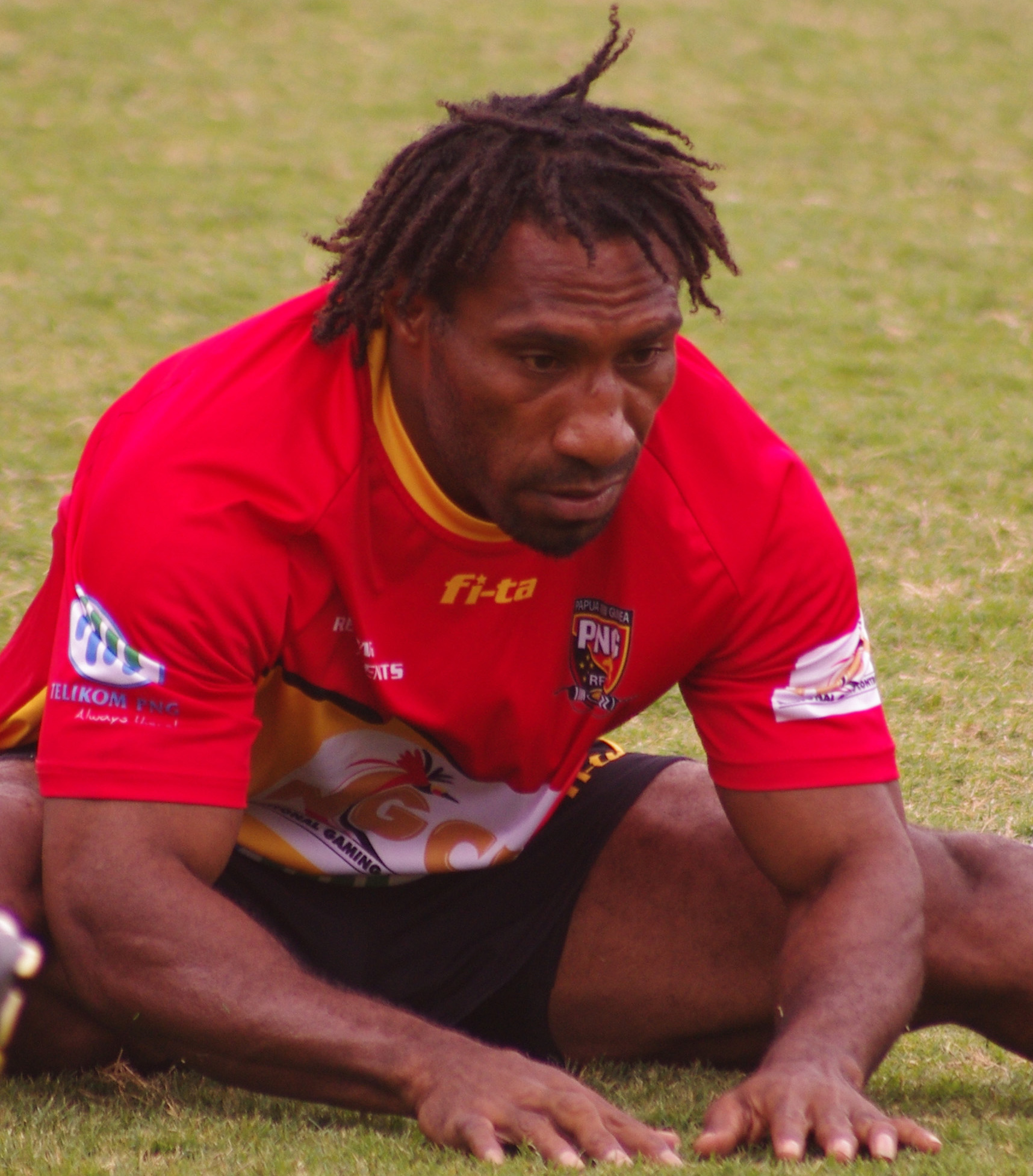

Personal information
- Born: 19 November 1984 (age 41) Eastern Highlands Province, Papua New Guinea
- Height: 183 cm (6 ft 0 in)
- Weight: 92 kg (14 st 7 lb)

Playing information
- Position: Hooker
Club
Years	Team	Pld	T	G	FG	P
	Brian Bell Bulldogs
	Mendi Muruks
2009–10	Hunslet Hawks	41	8	0	0	32
2014	Hela Wigmen
2015	Newcastle Thunder	17	5	0	0	20
	Total	58	13	0	0	52
Representative
Years	Team	Pld	T	G	FG	P
2005–13	PNG Prime Minister's XIII	7	0	0	0	0
2009–13	Papua New Guinea	13	1	0	0	4
- Source: As of 9 November 2023

Charlie Wabo is a Papua New Guinean professional rugby league footballer who played as a hooker for the Newcastle Thunder in Kingstone Press League 1. He is a Papua New Guinea international.

Wabo is from the Okapa District of the Eastern Highlands Province of Papua New Guinea.

In August 2008, Wabo was named in the Papua New Guinea training squad for the 2008 Rugby League World Cup and in October he was named in the final PNG squad.

Wabo was named in the interchange in each of PNG's three games in the 2008 Rugby League World Cup.

In 2009 Wabo moved to England to play for Hunslet Hawks in Championship One.

Wabo was named as part of the Papua New Guinea squad for the 2009 Pacific Cup. He was used as an impact sub playing hooker to great effect. His trademark solid tackling and flamboyant play ensured, along with David Mead, he was one of the crowd favourites for the PNG Kumuls during the Pacific Cup.

He played for Papua New Guinea in the 2010 Four Nations tournament. In 2011 he returned to play in Papua New Guinea. In 2013 he played in the Rugby League World Cup for Papua New Guinea.

In 2014 he played hooker for the Kroton Hela Wigmen and helped the Wigmen win its first premiership after defeating heavily favoured Agmark Rabaul Gurias in Lae. In 2019 he was appointed Assistance Coach for the Hela Wigmen. While appreciating his presence in the team the head coach praised him and said:

Charlie is a role model to the current crop of players in the team. He was their childhood idol ... Charlie's experience and knowledge of the game has helped the boys a lot, they are listening to him and he has brought a culture of respect into the side.

When 2020 Digicel Cup competition season was about to begin, he was appointed as the head coach for Kroton Hela Wigmen. During his first year tenure as head coach, he successfully delivered another trophy for the Wigmen after his team defeated the Lae Snax Tigers in the grand final in front of sold-out crowd at the National Football Stadium. To add on to his achievement, he was awarded the Coach of the Year award by the PNGRL.
