= Elijah Riyong =

PNG international rugby league footballer

Personal information
- Born: 10 January 1988 (age 38) Papua New Guinea
- Height: 184 cm (6 ft 0 in)
- Weight: 90 kg (14 st 2 lb)

Playing information
- Position: Wing
Representative
Years	Team	Pld	T	G	FG	P
2009–10	Papua New Guinea
2009–11	PNG Prime Minister's XIII	3	0	0	0	0
- Source: As of 18 November 2026

Elijah Riyong is a professional rugby league footballer who currently plays for the Port Moresby Vipers. He is a Papua New Guinea international and competed in the 2010 Four Nations. He made his test debut in 2009.
