= Glen Nami =

PNG international rugby league footballer

Personal information
- Born: Papua New Guinea

Playing information
- Position: Stand-off
Club
Years	Team	Pld	T	G	FG	P
	Goroka Lahanis
2012	Whitehaven
	Total	0	0	0	0	0
Representative
Years	Team	Pld	T	G	FG	P
2009–10	Papua New Guinea	5	1	0	0	4
2009–12	PNG Prime Minister's XIII	4	1	6	0	16
- Source: As of 9 November 2023

Glen Nami is a Papua New Guinean rugby league coach and former player for the Goroka Lahanis. His position is at stand-off. He played for the Kumuls in the 2010 Four Nations and scored a try against New Zealand. He joined Whitehaven in 2012.
