= James Nightingale (rugby league) =

PNG international rugby league footballer

Personal information
- Born: 25 September 1986 (age 38); Penrith, New South Wales, Australia
- Height: 184 cm (6 ft 0 in)
- Weight: 98 kg (15 st 6 lb)

Playing information
- Position: Prop, Second-row, Lock
Representative
Years	Team	Pld	T	G	FG	P
2007–10	Papua New Guinea	9	0	0	0	0

James Nightingale (born 25 September 1986) is a former Papua New Guinea international rugby league footballer who played as a second-row forward for the Penrith Panthers in the NRL.

== Background ==
James Nightingale was born in Penrith, New South Wales, Australia. James' eldest brother Matthew Nightingale (b. 23 July 1981) represented Papua New Guinea, played for the Penrith Panthers, Wests Tigers and the Parramatta Eels.

== Playing career ==
He was named in the Papua New Guinea training squad for the 2008 Rugby League World Cup. He was then named in the PNG squad for the 2008 Rugby League World Cup.

Nightingale was named as part of the Papua New Guinea squad for the 2009 Pacific Cup.

He was also added as a replacement player in the PNG rugby league squad for the Four Nations tournament in 2010.
