= Makali Aizue =

PNG international rugby league footballer

Personal information
- Full name: Makali P. Aizue
- Born: 30 December 1977 (age 48) Goroka, Eastern Highlands Province, Papua New Guinea
- Height: 6 ft 0 in (1.83 m)
- Weight: 110 kg (17 st 5 lb)

Playing information
- Position: Prop
Club
Years	Team	Pld	T	G	FG	P
1998–05	Goroka Lahanis
2004–09	Hull Kingston Rovers	159	29	0	0	116
2010–12	Halifax	58	6	0	0	24
2013–15	Dewsbury Rams	72	8	0	0	32
2016–17	Doncaster	30	4	0	0	16
	Total	319	47	0	0	188
Representative
Years	Team	Pld	T	G	FG	P
2000–10	Papua New Guinea	12	1	0	0	4
- Source: As of 12 June 2016

Makali P. Aizue (born 1977) is a Papua New Guinean former professional rugby league footballer who last played as a prop for Doncaster in Kingstone Press League 1.

== Personal life ==
Aizue was born in Goroka, Eastern Highlands Province, Papua New Guinea.

== Club career ==
=== Goroka Lahanis ===
Aizue started playing for the Goroka Lahanis from 1998 to 2001.

=== Hull Kingston Rovers ===
Aizue joined Hull Kingston Rovers in 2004 after leaving the Lahanis. He played for 43 games over 4 years.

=== Halifax RLFC ===
Aizue went to Halifax in 2011 and became the first prop choice for the club. He left the club in September 2012.

=== Dewsbury Rams RLFC ===
Aizue joined Dewsbury Rams in 2013 till the end of 2015.

=== Doncaster RLFC ===
Aizue has signed for Doncaster for the 2016 season.

== Representative career ==
=== Papua New Guinea ===
Aizue was selected in the PNG training squad and eventually for the PNG squad for the 2008 Rugby League World Cup.

He played for Papua New Guinea in the 2010 Four Nations tournament.
