= List of Wests Tigers representatives =

Including players from the Wests Tigers that have represented while at the club and the years they achieved their honours, if known. Representatives from the Western Suburbs Magpies (NSW Cup) and Balmain Ryde-Eastwood Tigers are included as they were feeder clubs.

== International ==
=== Australia ===
- (Australia) Scott Prince (2005)
- (Australia) Robbie Farah (2009–10, 2012–14)
- (Australia) Lote Tuqiri (2010)
- (Australia) Chris Lawrence (2010–11)
- (Australia) Keith Galloway (2011)
- (Australia) Aaron Woods (2014–17)
- (Australia) Kezie Apps (2023-25)

=== New Zealand ===
- (New Zealand) Jason Lowrie (2000)
- (New Zealand) Tyran Smith (2000)
- (New Zealand) Dene Halatau (2004–09)
- (New Zealand) Paul Whatuira (2005–07)
- (New Zealand) Benji Marshall (2005–12, 2019)
- (New Zealand) Bronson Harrison (2005, 2008)
- (New Zealand) Taniela Tuiaki (2007)
- (New Zealand) Adam Blair (2012, 2014)
- (New Zealand) Martin Taupau (2014–15)
- (New Zealand) Russell Packer (2017)
- (New Zealand) Elijah Taylor (2017)
- (New Zealand) Esan Marsters (2018–19)
- (New Zealand) Isaiah Papali'i (2022-24)

=== England ===
- (England) Gareth Ellis (2009–11)
- (England) Chris Heighington (2011)
- (England) John Bateman (2023-24)

=== Tonga ===
- (Tonga) Richard Villasanti (2000)
- (Tonga) Willie Manu (2000)
- (Tonga) Taniela Tuiaki (2006)
- (Tonga) Willie Mataka (2009)
- (Tonga) Andrew Fifita (2010)
- (Tonga) Ben Murdoch-Masila (2013)
- (Tonga) Sitaleki Akauola (2014)
- (Tonga) Asipeli Fine (2014)
- (Tonga) Haveatama Luani (2014–15)
- (Tonga) Delouise Hoeter (2014–15)
- (Tonga) Moses Suli (2017)
- (Tonga) Tuimoala Lolohea (2017–18)
- (Tonga) Starford To'a (2023)
- (Tonga) Junior Tupou (2023)

=== Samoa ===
- (Samoa) Laloa Milford (2000)
- (Samoa) Ben Te'o (2008)
- (Samoa) Masada Iosefa (2013)
- (Samoa) Eddy Pettybourne (2013)
- (Samoa) Sauaso Sue (2013–17)
- (Samoa) Tim Simona (2014–16)
- (Samoa) David Nofoaluma (2016, 2019–22)
- (Samoa) Michael Chee-Kam (2018–19)
- (Samoa) Josh Aloiai (2018–19)
- (Samoa) Pita Godinet (2018)
- (Samoa) Fa'amanu Brown (2022)
- (Samoa) Kelma Tuilagi (2022)
- (Samoa) Stefano Utoikamanu (2023)
- (Samoa) Justin Matamua (2023)
- (Samoa) Pauline Piliae-Rasabale (2023)
- (Samoa) Tommy Talau (2023)
- (Samoa) Jarome Luai (2024-25)
- (Samoa) Jeral Skelton (2024)
- (Samoa) Terrell May (2025)

=== Fiji ===
- (Fiji) Marika Koroibete (2013–14)
- (Fiji) Kevin Naiqama (2015–18)
- (Fiji) Taane Milne (2017)
- (Fiji) Joseph Ratuvakacereivalu (2019)
- (Fiji) Jahream Bula (2023-25)
- (Fiji) Brandon Wakeham (2023)
- (Fiji) Sunia Turuva (2025)
- (Fiji) Solomone Saukuru (2025)

=== Papua New Guinea ===
- (Papua New Guinea) Rod Griffin (2016)

=== Cook Islands ===
- (Cook Islands) Manikura Tikinau (2009)
- (Cook Islands) Keith Lulia (2013)
- (Cook Islands) Chance Peni (2015–16)
- (Cook Islands) Esan Marsters (2015, 2017)
- (Cook Islands) Rua Ngatikaura (2022-23)
- (Cook Islands) Reuben Porter (2025)

=== Lebanon ===
- (Lebanon) Hassan Saleh (2001–02)
- (Lebanon) Andrew Kazzi (2017)
- (Lebanon) Jaleel Seve-Derbas (2017)
- (Lebanon) Christian Yassmin (2017)
- (Lebanon) Alex Twal (2017)
- (Lebanon) Robbie Farah (2019)
- (Lebanon) Adam Doueihi (2022)
- (Lebanon) Michael Tannous (2022)

=== Greece ===
- (Greece) Braith Anasta (2013)

=== Italy ===
- (Italy) James Tedesco (2013, 2017)
- (Italy) Brenden Santi (2013)
- (Italy) Nathan Milone (2017)

=== Ireland ===
- (Republic of Ireland) Ryan Tandy (2008)
- (Republic of Ireland) Pat Richards (2013)
- (Republic of Ireland) Henry O'Kane (2022)

=== United States ===
- (United States) Joel Luani (2013)
- (United States) Eddy Pettybourne (2013)

=== Serbia ===
- (Serbia) Jordan Grant (2016)

== State Of Origin ==
=== New South Wales ===
- (New South Wales) Terry Hill (2000)
- (New South Wales) Brett Hodgson (2006)
- (New South Wales) Robbie Farah (2009, 2012–16)
- (New South Wales) Keith Galloway (2011)
- (New South Wales) Aaron Woods (2013–17)
- (New South Wales) James Tedesco (2016–17)
- (New South Wales) Apisai Koroisau (2023)
- (New South Wales) Stefano Utoikamanu (2023)
- (New South Wales) Jarome Luai (2025)

=== Queensland ===
- (Queensland) Scott Prince (2004)
- (Queensland) Moses Mbye (2019)
- (Queensland) Harry Grant (2020) (on loan from Melbourne Storm)
- (Queensland) Joe Ofahengaue (2021)

=== New South Wales Women ===
- (New South Wales) Botille Vette-Welsh (2019–21)
- (New South Wales) Kezie Apps (2023-25)
- (New South Wales) Sarah Togatuki (2023-25)

== All Stars Game ==
=== NRL All Stars ===
- (New Zealand) Benji Marshall (2010–13)
- (Australia) Robbie Farah (2010, 2013)
- (Australia) Liam Fulton (2011)
- (New Zealand) Adam Blair (2012)
- (Australia) Luke Brooks (2015)
- (Australia) Mitchell Moses (2017)

=== Māori All Stars ===
- (Māori people) Zane Musgrove (2021)
- (Māori people) Russell Packer (2021)
- (Māori people) Tukimihia Simpkins (2023)

=== Indigenous All Stars ===
- Brent Naden (2023)
- Daine Laurie (2023)

== City Vs Country Origin ==
=== NSW City ===
- (New South Wales) Ben Galea (2001)
- (New South Wales) John Skandalis (2002, 2004–06)
- (New South Wales) Darren Senter (2002)
- (New South Wales) Kevin McGuinness (2002)
- (New South Wales) Brett Hodgson (2004–06, 2008)
- (New South Wales) Robbie Farah (2006–07, 2009–12)
- (New South Wales) Bryce Gibbs (2007–08, 2010)
- (New South Wales) Dean Collis (2007)
- (New South Wales) Keith Galloway (2009–11)
- (New South Wales) Chris Lawrence (2010, 2012, 2016)
- (New South Wales) Liam Fulton (2011–12)
- (New South Wales) Simon Dwyer (2011)
- (New South Wales) Aaron Woods (2012, 2014)
- (New South Wales) James Tedesco (2013, 2015)
- (New South Wales) Curtis Sironen (2013, 2015, 2016)
- (New South Wales) Joel Reddy (2013)
- (New South Wales) David Nofoaluma (2016)
- (New South Wales) Kyle Lovett (2016)

=== NSW Country ===
- (New South Wales) Anthony Laffranchi (2006)
- (New South Wales) Chris Heighington (2008, 2011)
- (New South Wales) Tim Moltzen (2011)

== Other honours ==
=== Prime Minister's XIII ===
- (Australia) Robbie Farah (2006, 2008–09, 2013–14)
- (Australia) Chris Lawrence (2007–08, 2012)
- (Australia) Chris Heighington (2008–09)
- (Australia) Beau Ryan (2012)
- (Australia) Aaron Woods (2012, 2014, 2016–17)
- (Australia) David Nofoaluma (2015)
- (Australia) James Tedesco (2016–17)
- (Australia) Mitchell Moses (2016)
- (Australia) Daine Laurie (2022)
- (Australia) Luke Garner (2022)
- (Australia) Jake Simpkin (2022)
- (Australia) Jakiya Whitfeld (2023)
- (Australia) Botille Vette-Welsh (2023)
- (Australia) Christian Pio (2023)
- (Australia) Lachlan Galvin (2024)
- (Australia) Alex Seyfarth (2024)
- (Australia) Caitlin Turnbull (2025)

=== Indigenous Dreamtime Team ===
- Daine Laurie (2008)

=== All Golds ===
- (New Zealand) Benji Marshall (2008)

=== New Zealand Māori ===
- (Māori people) Tyran Smith (2000)
- (Māori people) Kylie Leuluai (2000)

== Representative Captains ==
=== Test Captains ===
New Zealand

- (New Zealand) Benji Marshall (2008–12, 2019)

Fiji

- (Fiji) Kevin Naiqama (2016–18)

=== State of Origin ===
New South Wales

- (New South Wales) Robbie Farah (2013, 2015)

=== City Vs Country Origin ===
NSW City

- (New South Wales) Brett Hodgson (2008)
- (New South Wales) Robbie Farah (2009–12)
- (New South Wales) Chris Lawrence (2016)

=== Prime Minister's XIII ===
- (Australia) Aaron Woods (2017)

=== All Stars Game ===
NRL All Stars

- (New Zealand) Benji Marshall (2012–13)

== Representative Coaching Staff ==
=== International ===
Australia

- (Australia) Tim Sheens (Coach – 2009–12)

New Zealand

- (New Zealand) Michael Maguire (2019)

=== State Of Origin ===
New South Wales

- (New South Wales) Wayne Pearce (Coach – 2000)

=== City Vs Country Origin ===
NSW City

- (New South Wales) Tim Sheens (Coach – 2006–08)
