= List of Wests Tigers records =

== Honours and achievements ==
=== National Rugby League ===
- NRL Premiership: 1

2005

=== Pre-season/youth ===
- Rugby League World Sevens: 1

2004

- Foundation Cup: 1

2011

- Under-20s Premiership: 1

2012

=== New South Wales Rugby League ===
- Harold Matthews Cup: 1

2022

- NSW Women's Premiership: 1

2022

== Stadium/crowd records ==
=== Home ground/venue record ===
Present:

- Commbank Stadium (2019–): 36 played; 13 wins, 23 losses
- Campbelltown Sports Stadium (2000–): 104 played; 40 wins, 63 losses, 1 draw
- Leichhardt Oval (2000–): 106 played; 61 wins, 44 losses, 1 draw

Occasional:

- Suncorp Stadium, Brisbane (2019–): 27 played; 11 wins, 16 losses

Former:

- Lancaster Park, Christchurch (2004–2006): 3 played; 2 wins, 1 loss
- Scully Park, Tamworth (2018–2024): 5 played; 1 win, 4 losses
- Accor Stadium (2005–2008, 2014–2018): 92 played; 36 wins, 56 losses
- Sydney Cricket Ground (2008–2020): 9 played; 3 wins, 6 losses
- Allianz Stadium (2009–2013): 42 played; 16 wins, 26 losses

=== Largest home game crowds ===
Rank	Amount	When
1	36,112	28/03/2016 – Wests Tigers 0 – Parramatta 8
2	34,272	21/08/2009 – Wests Tigers 18 – Parramatta 26
3	30,901	23/07/2017 – Wests Tigers 16 – Parramatta 17
4	30,420	02/04/2018 – Wests Tigers 30 – Parramatta 20
5	29,542	19/08/2005 – Wests Tigers 54 – Bulldogs 2
6	28,611	10/04/2023 – Wests Tigers 22 – Parramatta 28
7	27,865	10/03/2006 – Wests Tigers 24 – St George Illawarra 15
8	27,687	05/08/2011 – Wests Tigers 16 – St George Illawarra 14
9	27,564	23/08/2008 – Wests Tigers 16 – Manly 48
10	26,463	09/09/2005 – Wests Tigers 50 – North QLD 6

=== Lowest home game crowds ===
Rank	Amount	When
1	104	20/06/2020 – Wests Tigers 36 – North QLD 20
2	109	13/06/2020 – Wests Tigers 6 – Canberra 14
3	2,633	17/07/2020 – Wests Tigers 48 – Brisbane 0
4	2,758	16/08/2020 – Wests Tigers 29 – Canterbury 28
5	3,003	22/08/2020 – Wests Tigers 16 — Sydney 38
6	3,801	10/09/2020 – Wests Tigers 24 – Souths 26
7	3,960	04/07/2020 – Wests Tigers 12 – Penrith 19
8	4,125	25/05/2003 – Wests Tigers 4 – Penrith 26
9	4,359	28/07/2001 – Wests Tigers 38 – Northern Eagles 6
10	4,724	14/07/2001 – Wests Tigers 20 – North QLD 18

=== Highest average home crowds for the season (minimum 3 games, finals excluded) ===
Rank	Amount	Season
1	18,967	2006
2	18,789	2005
3	18,086	2010
4	17,942	2009
5	17,852	2011
6	17,511	2004
7	17,291	2018
8	16,961	2007
9	16,386	2008
10	16,227	2012

== Overall records ==
=== Biggest wins ===
Margin	Score	Opponent	Venue	Date
52	54–2	Canterbury-Bankstown Bulldogs	Stadium Australia	19 August 2005
52	56–4	Canterbury-Bankstown Bulldogs	Stadium Australia	3 August 2008
50	56–6	South Sydney Rabbitohs	Leichhardt Oval	8 August 2004
48	66–18	North Queensland Cowboys	Leichhardt Oval	20 May 2023
48	48–0	Brisbane Broncos	Leichhardt Oval	17 July 2020
46	50–4	South Sydney Rabbitohs	Sydney Football Stadium	4 August 2002
46	50–4	New Zealand Warriors	Lancaster Park	13 June 2004

=== Biggest losses ===
Margin	Score	Opponent	Venue	Date
74	0–74	North Queensland Cowboys	North Queensland Stadium	1 July 2023
68	0–68	Penrith Panthers	CommBank Stadium	7 June 2026
66	6–72	Sydney Roosters	Sydney Cricket Ground	20 August 2022
64	0–64	Melbourne Storm	Docklands Stadium	5 July 2001
64	0–64	Melbourne Storm	AAMI Park	11 May 2025
58	6–64	North Queensland Cowboys	Willows Sports Complex	9 August 2014
56	0–56	Sydney Roosters	Campbelltown Stadium	25 June 2004
54	12–66	Parramatta Eels	Leichhardt Oval	29 April 2001
54	6–60	Canberra Raiders	Canberra Stadium	23 April 2016

=== Most tries scored in a season ===
Rank	Tries	Season
1	140	2005
2	107	2010
3	103	2009
4	98	2011
5	92	2008
5	92	2007
7	90	2004
7	90	2006
9	89	2002
9	89	2012

=== Most goals converted in a season ===
Rank	Goals	Season
1	124	2005
2	84	2007
3	82	2000
4	81	2011
5	80	2008
6	77	2010
7	76	2021
8	75	2003
9	74	2004
10	73	2012

=== Most field goals kicked in a season ===
Rank	FG	Season
1	8	2010
2	6	2011
3	5	2007
4	4	2012
4	4	2009
4	4	2014

=== Most points scored in a season ===
Rank	Points	Season
1	676	2005
2	568	2009
3	541	2007
4	537	2010
5	528	2008
6	519	2000
6	519	2011
8	509	2004
9	506	2012
10	500	2021

=== Most points conceded in a season ===
Rank	Points	Season
1	750	2024
2	746	2001
3	714	2021
4	687	2013
5	679	2022
6	675	2023
7	642	2000
7	642	2002
8	631	2014
9	607	2016
10	598	2003

=== Most consecutive wins ===
- 9, 16 July – 9 September 2011
- 8, 26 June – 19 August 2005
- 7, 15 April – 8 June 2012
- 6, 15 April – 27 May 2007
- 6, 4 July – 16 August 2009
- 4, 9 September – 2 October 2005
- 4, 21 May – 20 June 2010

=== Most consecutive losses ===
- 12, 7 August 2022 – 29 April 2023
- 10, 2 June 2023 – 19 August 2023
- 9, 6 April 2024 – 15 June 2024
- 8, 6 April – 3 June 2001
- 8, 21 August 2021 – 10 April 2022
- 8, 20 June 2026 – 23 August 2026
- 7, 22 March – 18 May 2013
- 7, 29 April – 23 June 2017
- 7, 28 May – 30 July 2022
- 7, 30 June 2024 – 17 August 2024
- 6, 5 May – 15 June 2002
- 6, 12 April – 25 May 2003
- 6, 5 July – 19 August 2013
- 6, 27 July – 30 August 2014
- 6, 19 March – 23 April 2016
- 6, 11 May 2025 – 6 July 2025
- 5, 9 July 2000 – 17 February 2001

=== Biggest comeback ===
Recovered from a 24-point deficit.

- Trailed Newcastle Knights 24–0 after 26 minutes to win 36–32 at Campbelltown Stadium (11 August 2001).

=== Worst collapse ===
Surrendered a 23-point lead.

- Led Penrith Panthers 31–8 after 57 minutes to lose 32–31 at Penrith Football Stadium (4 June 2000).

=== Win–loss record ===
Opponent	Played	Won	Drawn	Lost	Win %
Brisbane Broncos	35	9	1	25	25.71
Canberra Raiders	48	21	0	27	43.75
Canterbury-Bankstown Bulldogs	47	19	0	28	40.26
Cronulla-Sutherland Sharks	40	20	1	19	50.00
Dolphins	5	2	0	3	40.00
Gold Coast Titans	30	12	0	18	40.00
Manly-Warringah Sea Eagles	40	16	0	24	40.00
Melbourne Storm	40	12	0	28	30.00
Newcastle Knights	42	19	0	23	45.24
New Zealand Warriors	41	17	0	24	41.00
North Queensland Cowboys	50	25	0	25	50.00
Northern Eagles	6	4	0	2	66.7
Parramatta Eels	52	19	1	32	36.54
Penrith Panthers	45	15	0	30	33.33
St. George Illawarra Dragons	49	22	0	27	44.90
South Sydney Rabbitohs	46	18	0	28	39.13
Sydney Roosters	41	11	0	30	26.83
Total	657	261	3	393	39.73

== Individual records ==
Current players are in bold.

=== Most first grade matches ===
Player	M
Robbie Farah	277
Benji Marshall	257
Chris Lawrence	253
Luke Brooks	205
Chris Heighington	201
David Nofoaluma	192
John Skandalis	185
**Alex Twal**	182
Dene Halatau	180
Keith Galloway	173
Liam Fulton	162
Bryce Gibbs	155
Todd Payten	151
Ben Galea	150

- as at 6 September 2026

=== Most matches as captain ===
Player	M
Robbie Farah	153
Darren Senter	86
**Apisai Koroisau**	68
Brett Hodgson	50
Aaron Woods	45
James Tamou	36
Benji Marshall	33
Scott Prince	29
Moses Mbye	28
Mark O'Neill	19

- as at 6 September 2026

=== Most tries in a match ===
- 4, Kevin McGuinness against South Sydney Rabbitohs at Sydney Football Stadium (4 August 2002)
- 4, Marika Koroibete against Parramatta Eels at Campbelltown Stadium (6 August 2012)
- 4, Keith Lulia against Canterbury-Bankstown Bulldogs at ANZ Stadium (20 July 2014)

=== Most goals in a match ===
- 11, against North Queensland Cowboys at Leichhardt Oval (20 May 2023)
- 9, Brett Hodgson against Canterbury Bulldogs at Telstra Stadium (19 August 2005)
- 9, Brett Hodgson against North Queensland Cowboys at Telstra Stadium (9 September 2005)

=== Most points in a match ===
- 30 (3 tries, 9 goals), Brett Hodgson against North Queensland Cowboys at Telstra Stadium (9 September 2005)
- 26 (3 tries, 7 goals), Paul Momirovski against St George-Illawarra Dragons at Sydney Cricket Ground (1 September 2019)
- 24 (2 tries, 8 goals), Benji Marshall against Cronulla-Sutherland Sharks at Endeavour Field (16 August 2009)
- 22 (1 try, 9 goals), Brett Hodgson against Canterbury-Bankstown Bulldogs at Stadium Australia (19 August 2005)
- 22 (2 tries, 7 goals), Pat Richards against Gold Coast Titans at Robina Stadium (16 March 2014)

=== Most tries by position ===
Position	Player	Tries
Fullback	James Tedesco	49
Winger	David Nofoaluma	99
Centre	Chris Lawrence	51
Five-eighth	Benji Marshall	72
Halfback	Luke Brooks	43
Front Row	John Skandalis	12
Back Row	Luke Garner	19
Hooker	Robbie Farah	64
Lock	Chris Heighington	16
Bench	Bronson Harrison	10

=== Most tries in a season ===
Tries	Player	Season
21	Taniela Tuiaki	2009
20	Pat Richards	2005
18	Paul Whatuira	2005
18	Lote Tuqiri	2010
17	David Nofoaluma	2020
17	James Tedesco	2015
17	Pat Richards	2015
16	John Wilson	2004
16	Chris Lawrence	2007
15	Joel Caine	2000
15	Chris Lawrence	2010
15	Brett Hodgson	2005
15	Benji Marshall	2005
14	David Nofoaluma	2016
14	Kevin McGuinness	2000
14	James Tedesco	2016

=== Most tries for club ===
Tries	Player
100	David Nofoaluma
84	Chris Lawrence
84	Benji Marshall
68	Robbie Farah
52	Pat Richards
50	James Tedesco
46	Beau Ryan
45	Luke Brooks
44	Daniel Fitzhenry
42	Taniela Tuiaki
39	Tim Moltzen
39	Chris Heighington
38	Brett Hodgson
37	Liam Fulton

- as at 6 September 2026

=== Most goals for club ===
Goals	Player
416	Benji Marshall
317	Brett Hodgson
211	Joel Caine
198	**Adam Doueihi**
123	Mitchell Moses
118	Pat Richards
96	Esan Marsters

- as at 6 September 2026

=== Most points in a season ===
Points	Player	Season
308	Brett Hodgson	2005
224	Joel Caine	2000
211	Benji Marshall	2011
203	Benji Marshall	2010
197	Pat Richards	2015
192	Brett Hodgson	2004
174	**Adam Doueihi**	2021

=== Most points for club ===
Player	Points
Benji Marshall	1181
Brett Hodgson	786
**Adam Doueihi**	539
Joel Caine	526
Pat Richards	446
David Nofoaluma	400
Chris Lawrence	342
Robbie Farah	312
Esan Marsters	264
Luke Brooks	233
Mitchell Moses	211
James Tedesco	200
Beau Ryan	184
Daniel Fitzhenry	176
Taniela Tuiaki	168

- as at 6 September 2026

=== Captains ===
There have been 31 captains of the Tigers since their first season in 2000. The current regular captains are Apisai Koroisau and Jarome Luai.

No	Captain	Years	Games	Won	Drawn	Lost	Win %
1	Jarrod McCracken	2000	6	2	1	3	33.33
2	Darren Senter	2000–04	86	29	2	55	33.72
3	Terry Hill	2000–02	2	0	0	2	0.00
4	Craig Field	2000	2	2	0	0	100.00
5	John Simon	2001	2	0	0	2	0.00
6	Ben Galea	2001–06	7	4	0	3	57.14
7	Mark O'Neill	2002–05	19	7	0	12	36.84
8	Corey Pearson	2002	1	0	0	1	0.00
9	Scott Sattler	2004	8	3	0	5	37.50
10	Scott Prince	2005–06	29	17	0	12	58.62
11	Brett Hodgson	2006–08	50	23	0	27	46.00
12	Todd Payten	2007–09	9	5	0	4	55.56
13	Robbie Farah	2007–16, 2019	153	78	0	75	50.98
14	Benji Marshall	2009–13, 2018–20	33	11	0	22	33.33
15	Braith Anasta	2014	5	1	0	4	20.00
16	Chris Lawrence	2014–18	15	7	0	8	46.67
17	Aaron Woods	2014–17	45	16	0	29	35.56
18	Dene Halatau	2015–16	8	3	0	5	37.50
19	Elijah Taylor	2017–18	7	3	0	4	42.86
20	Russell Packer	2018	5	3	0	2	60.00
21	Josh Reynolds	2018	1	0	0	1	0.00
22	Moses Mbye	2019–20	28	11	0	17	39.29
23	James Tamou	2021–22	36	11	0	25	30.56
24	Luke Brooks	2021–22	7	1	0	6	14.29
25	Ken Maumalo	2022	1	0	0	1	0.00
26	Jackson Hastings	2022	3	0	0	3	0.00
27	**Adam Doueihi**	2022–	1	0	0	1	0.00
28	**Apisai Koroisau**	2023–	68	18	0	50	26.47
29	John Bateman	2023–24	5	0	0	5	0.00
30	Jarome Luai	2025–2026	40	12	0	28	30.00
31	**Alex Twal**	2025–	1	1	0	0	100.00

- as at 6 September 2026

== Coaches ==
There have been 11 coaches of the Tigers since their first season in 2000. The current coach is Benji Marshall.

No	Name	Seasons	Games	Wins	Draws	Losses	Win %	Premiers	Runners-up	Minor premiers	Wooden spoons	Notes
1	Wayne Pearce	2000	26	11	2	13	42.3%	—	—	—	—	—
2	Terry Lamb	2001–2002	50	16	1	33	32%	—	—	—	—	—
3	Tim Sheens	2003–2012, 2023	273	126	0	147	46.15%	2005	—	—	2023	Club's first finals appearance and premiership in 2005.
4	Mick Potter	2013–2014	48	17	0	31	35%	—	—	—	—	—
5	Jason Taylor	2015–2017	51	20	0	31	39%	—	—	—	—	Sacked mid-season
6	Andrew Webster	2017	2	0	0	2	0%	—	—	—	—	Caretaker coach
7	Ivan Cleary	2017–2018	43	18	0	25	42%	—	—	—	—	—
8	Michael Maguire	2019–2022	80	29	0	51	36.25%	—	—	—	2022	Sacked mid-season
9	Brett Kimmorley	2022	12	1	0	11	8.33%	—	—	—	2022	Caretaker coach
10	Ben Gardiner	2022	1	0	0	1	0%	—	—	—	—	Caretaker coach
11	Benji Marshall	2024–	72	23	0	49	31.94%	—	—	—	2024	Current coach

== Season statistics ==
Season	Pos	Pld	W	D	L	B	F	A	+/-	Pts	Notes	Crowd*
2000	10th	26	11	2	13	N/A	519	642	−123	24	Wests Tigers 2000	12,124
2001	12th	26	9	1	16	N/A	474	746	−272	19	Wests Tigers 2001	9,287
2002	13th	24	7	0	17	2	498	642	−144	18	Wests Tigers 2002	10,478
2003	13th	24	7	0	17	2	470	598	−128	18	Wests Tigers 2003	8,993
2004	9th	24	10	0	14	2	509	534	−25	24	Wests Tigers 2004	13,935
2005	4th	24	14	0	10	2	676	575	101	32	Premiers; Wests Tigers 2005	19,998
2006	11th	24	10	0	14	2	490	565	−75	24	Wests Tigers 2006	19,357
2007	9th	24	11	0	13	1	541	561	−20	24	Wests Tigers 2007	16,766
2008	10th	24	11	0	13	2	528	560	−32	26	Wests Tigers 2008	15,930
2009	9th	24	12	0	12	2	558	483	75	28	Wests Tigers 2009	16,848
2010	3rd	24	15	0	9	2	537	503	34	34	Wests Tigers 2010	16,941
2011	4th	24	15	0	9	2	519	430	89	34	Wests Tigers 2011	17,852
2012	10th	24	11	0	13	2	506	551	−45	26	Wests Tigers 2012	16,227
2013	15th	24	7	0	17	2	386	687	−301	18	Wests Tigers 2013	10,507
2014	13th	24	10	0	14	2	420	631	−211	24	Wests Tigers 2014	13,104
2015	15th	24	8	0	16	2	487	562	−75	20	Wests Tigers 2015	11,709
2016	9th	24	11	0	13	2	499	607	−108	26	Wests Tigers 2016	15,390
2017	14th	24	7	0	17	2	413	571	−158	18	Wests Tigers 2017	13,551
2018	9th	24	12	0	12	1	377	460	−83	26	Wests Tigers 2018	17,181
2019	9th	24	11	0	13	1	475	486	−11	24	Wests Tigers 2019	13,992
2020	11th	20	7	0	13	0	440	505	−65	14	Wests Tigers 2020	2,966
2021	13th	24	8	0	16	1	500	714	−214	18	Wests Tigers 2021	9,526
2022	16th	24	4	0	20	1	352	679	−327	10	Wests Tigers 2022	11,094
2023	17th	24	4	0	20	3	385	675	−290	14	Wests Tigers 2023	11,042
2024	17th	24	6	0	18	3	463	750	−287	18	Wests Tigers 2024	12,653
2025	13th	24	9	0	15	3	477	612	−135	24	Wests Tigers 2025	15,383
2026	15th	24	8	0	16	3	445	699	−254	22	Wests Tigers 2026	15,433

* Average home crowd

== Individual club honours ==
=== Player of the Year (Kelly-Barnes Medal) ===
- 2000 – Tyran Smith
- 2001 – Ben Galea
- 2002 – John Skandalis
- 2003 – Anthony Laffranchi
- 2004 – Brett Hodgson
- 2005 – Scott Prince and Brett Hodgson
- 2006 – Robbie Farah
- 2007 – Robbie Farah
- 2009 – Gareth Ellis
- 2010 – Gareth Ellis
- 2011 – Gareth Ellis
- 2012 – Aaron Woods
- 2013 – Liam Fulton
- 2014 – Aaron Woods
- 2015 – James Tedesco
- 2016 – Mitchell Moses
- 2017 – Elijah Taylor
- 2018 – Luke Brooks
- 2019 – Luke Brooks
- 2020 – David Nofoaluma
- 2021 – Luke Brooks and Daine Laurie
- 2022 – Joe Ofahengaue
- 2023 – Jahream Bula
- 2024 – Samuela Fainu
- 2025 – Terrell May

=== Rookie of the Year ===
- 2006 – Shannon McDonnell
- 2007 – Chris Lawrence
- 2008 – Tim Moltzen
- 2009 – Blake Ayshford
- 2010 – Simon Dwyer
- 2012 – Marika Koroibete and Curtis Sironen
- 2013 – James Tedesco
- 2014 – Luke Brooks
- 2015 – Kyle Lovett
- 2016 – Josh Aloiai
- 2017 – Jacob Liddle
- 2018 – Esan Marsters
- 2019 – Thomas Mikaele
- 2020 – Harry Grant
- 2021 – Stefano Utoikamanu
- 2022 – Fonua Pole
- 2023 – Jahream Bula
- 2024 – Lachlan Galvin
- 2025 – Tony Sukkar

=== 100 games milestones ===
- 2004 — John Skandalis, Mark O'Neill
- 2005 — Ben Galea
- 2006 — Anthony Laffranchi
- 2007 — Daniel Fitzhenry
- 2008 — Chris Heighington, Dene Halatau, Brett Hodgson
- 2009 — Robbie Farah, Todd Payten, Bryce Gibbs, Benji Marshall
- 2011 — Liam Fulton, Keith Galloway
- 2012 — Beau Ryan, Chris Lawrence
- 2013 — Blake Ayshford
- 2015 — Aaron Woods
- 2017 — Ava Seumanufagai, Sauaso Sue
- 2018 — Luke Brooks, David Nofoaluma
- 2022 — Alex Twal

=== 150 games milestones ===
- 2006 — John Skandalis
- 2007 — Ben Galea
- 2010 — Chris Heighington
- 2011 — Robbie Farah, Bryce Gibbs, Todd Payten, Benji Marshall
- 2013 — Liam Fulton
- 2014 — Keith Galloway, Chris Lawrence
- 2015 — Dene Halatau
- 2021 — Luke Brooks, David Nofoaluma
- 2025 — Alex Twal

=== 200 games milestones ===
- 2012 — Chris Heighington
- 2013 — Robbie Farah, Benji Marshall
- 2017 — Chris Lawrence
- 2023 — Luke Brooks

=== 250 games milestones ===
- 2018 — Robbie Farah
- 2020 — Benji Marshall, Chris Lawrence

=== Dally M and player awards ===
- 2000 — Joel Caine (Top Points Scorer of the Year)
- 2005 — Scott Prince (Dally M Captain of the Year), Tim Sheens (Dally M Coach of the Year), Brett Hodgson (Dally M Fullback of the Year), Brett Hodgson (Top Points Scorer of the Year), Benji Marshall (Dally M Five-Eighth of the Year)
- 2007 — Robbie Farah (Dally M Hooker of the Year)
- 2009 — Taniela Tuiaki (Dally M Winger of the Year)
- 2010 — Robbie Farah (Dally M Hooker of the Year), Benji Marshall (Rugby League World Golden Boot)
- 2011 — Benji Marshall (Dally M Five-Eighth of the Year), Benji Marshall (Top Points Scorer of the Year)
- 2013 — David Nofoaluma (Dally M Try of the Year)
- 2014 — Luke Brooks (Dally M Rookie of the Year)
- 2015 — Aaron Woods (Dally M Prop of the Year)
- 2016 — James Tedesco (Dally M Fullback of the Year)
- 2017 — Aaron Woods (Dally M Prop of the Year)
- 2018 — Luke Brooks (Dally M Halfback of the Year)
- 2020 — Harry Grant (Dally M Rookie of the Year), David Nofoaluma (Dally M Winger of the Year)

== See also ==
- List of NRL records
