= Robbie Farah =

Australia & Lebanon international rugby league footballer (born 1984)

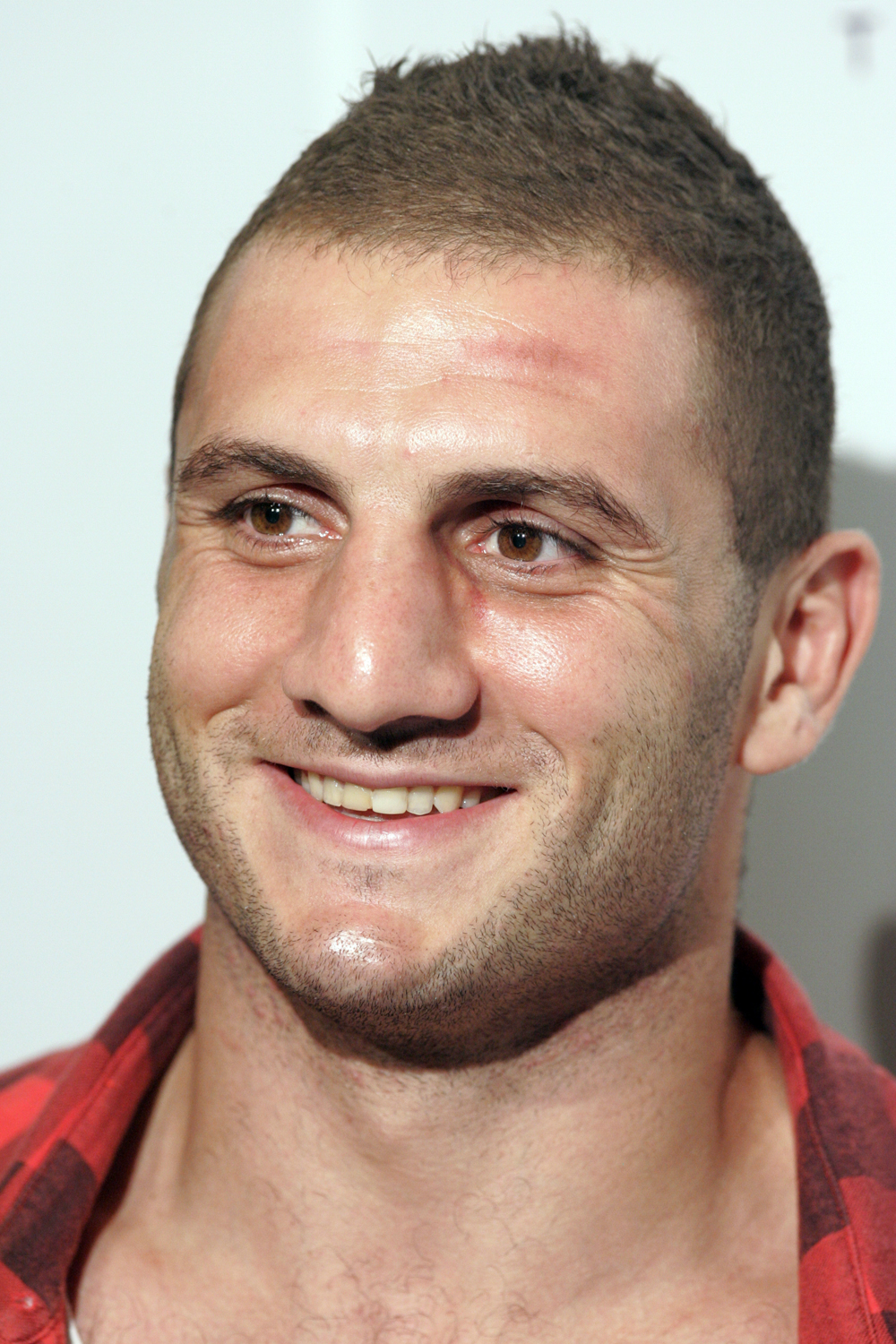

Personal information
- Full name: Robert Peter Farah
- Born: 23 January 1984 (age 42) Campsie, New South Wales, Australia

Playing information
- Height: 179 cm (5 ft 10 in)
- Weight: 90 kg (14 st 2 lb)
- Position: Hooker, Halfback
Club
Years	Team	Pld	T	G	FG	P
2003–16	Wests Tigers	247	61	12	16	284
2017–18	South Sydney	26	2	0	0	8
2018–19	Wests Tigers	30	7	0	0	28
	Total	303	70	12	16	320
Representative
Years	Team	Pld	T	G	FG	P
2002–19	Lebanon	7	1	0	0	4
2006–12	NSW City	6	1	0	0	4
2006–14	Prime Minister's XIII	5	1	0	0	4
2009–16	New South Wales	16	0	0	0	0
2009–14	Australia	8	0	0	0	0
2010–13	NRL All Stars	3	0	0	0	0

Robert Peter Farah (Arabic: روبي فرح; born 23 January 1984) is a former professional rugby league footballer who played in the 2000s and 2010s. An Australian international, Lebanese international and captain of New South Wales Blues team, he has played the majority of his professional career with the Wests Tigers, with whom he won the 2005 NRL Premiership. Between 2006 and 2012, Farah played for City in six City vs Country representative games, captaining the team from 2009 onwards. He played for the South Sydney Rabbitohs during the 2017 and 2018 National Rugby League seasons.

== Background ==
Born in Sydney, New South Wales, Farah is of Lebanese descent and was educated at St Mel's Primary, Campsie, De La Salle College Ashfield, and the University of Sydney, graduating with a Bachelor of Economics in 2010.

Farah is a supporter of Liverpool F.C. in English football's Premier League, his favourite player being Steven Gerrard.

He played his junior rugby league with the Enfield Federals and the Leichhardt Wanderers.

== Playing career ==
=== 2002 ===
As an 18-year-old in 2002, he toured with the Lebanese team, playing France in Tripoli and scoring a try.

=== 2003 ===
In round 13, Farah made his NRL debut for the Wests Tigers against the Manly-Warringah Sea Eagles at Leichhardt Oval, playing off the interchange bench in the Tigers 30–38 loss. Farah played in 4 matches in his debut year.

=== 2004 ===
Farah's season was marred by a knee re-construction and his first-grade playing time was restricted to 3 matches for 2004.

=== 2005 ===
With Wests Tigers hookers Robbie Mears and Darren Senter both retiring at the end of the 2004 season, Farah was the club's main hooker for 2005. Early in the year he would often start on the bench and interchange with Ben Galea, but by the end of the year he was described as having replaced, "captain Darren Senter at hooker with relative ease." In round 7, against the Parramatta Eels, Farah scored his first and second NRL career tries in the Tigers 16–26 loss at Parramatta Stadium. In round 20, against the South Sydney Rabbitohs, he scored a hat trick in the Tigers 42–20 win at Leichhardt Oval. Farah was the starting hooker in the Wests Tigers 30-16 2005 NRL grand final winning team over the North Queensland Cowboys. He finished the season with 27 matches and 8 tries.

=== 2006 ===
As NRL Premiers, Wests faced Super League champions the Bradford Bulls in the 2006 World Club Challenge. Farah played at hooker in the Tigers 10–30 loss. Farah was selected for the NSW City Origin squad, playing in City's 10–12 loss to NSW Country Origin in Dubbo. Farah was named the Wests Tigers player of the year in the 2006 NRL season, playing in 20 matches and scoring 5 tries.

In September, Farah was selected in the Prime Minister's XIII squad. Soon after, he re-signed with the Tigers on a contract to the end of the 2010 season.

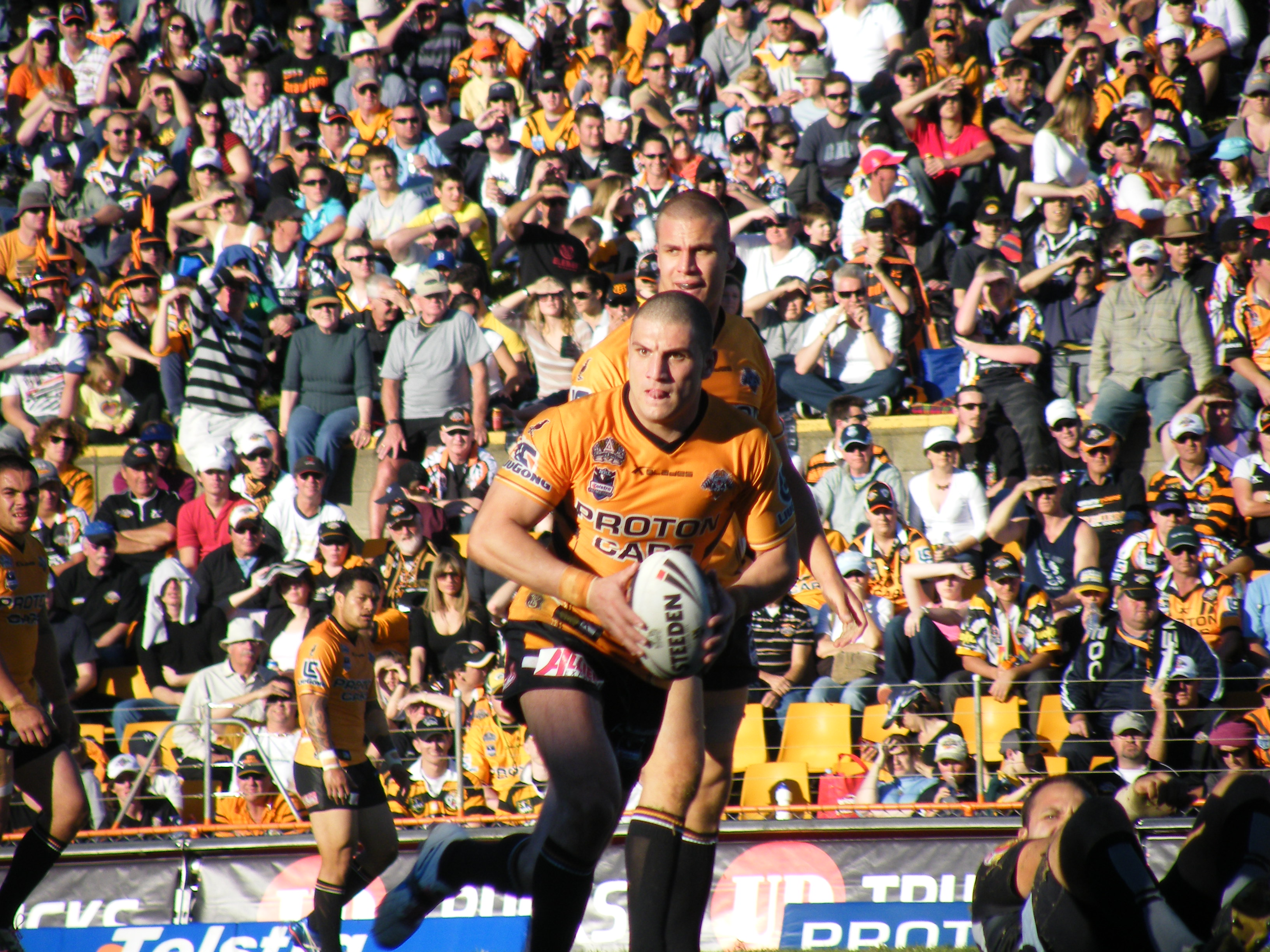
Farah playing for the Wests Tigers

=== 2007 ===
In May, Farah played for the NSW City team again, scoring a try. He was named hooker of the year at the 2007 Dally M Awards, and was one point behind the Player of the Year, Johnathan Thurston. Some pundits claimed Farah should have won. Farah was again named the Wests Tigers player of the year, playing in all the Tigers 24 matches, and scoring 7 tries, kicking 12 goals and 4 field goals.

=== 2008 ===
In August, Farah was named in the preliminary 46-man Kangaroos squad for the 2008 World Cup. He was not selected in the final 24-man squad. Farah finished the 2008 NRL season with 17 matches and 6 tries.

=== 2009 ===
On 13 January, it was announced that Farah had chosen to re-sign with the Wests Tigers until the end of the 2013 season, spurning a lucrative offer from the Gold Coast Titans. At the same time, the club appointed Farah as team captain.

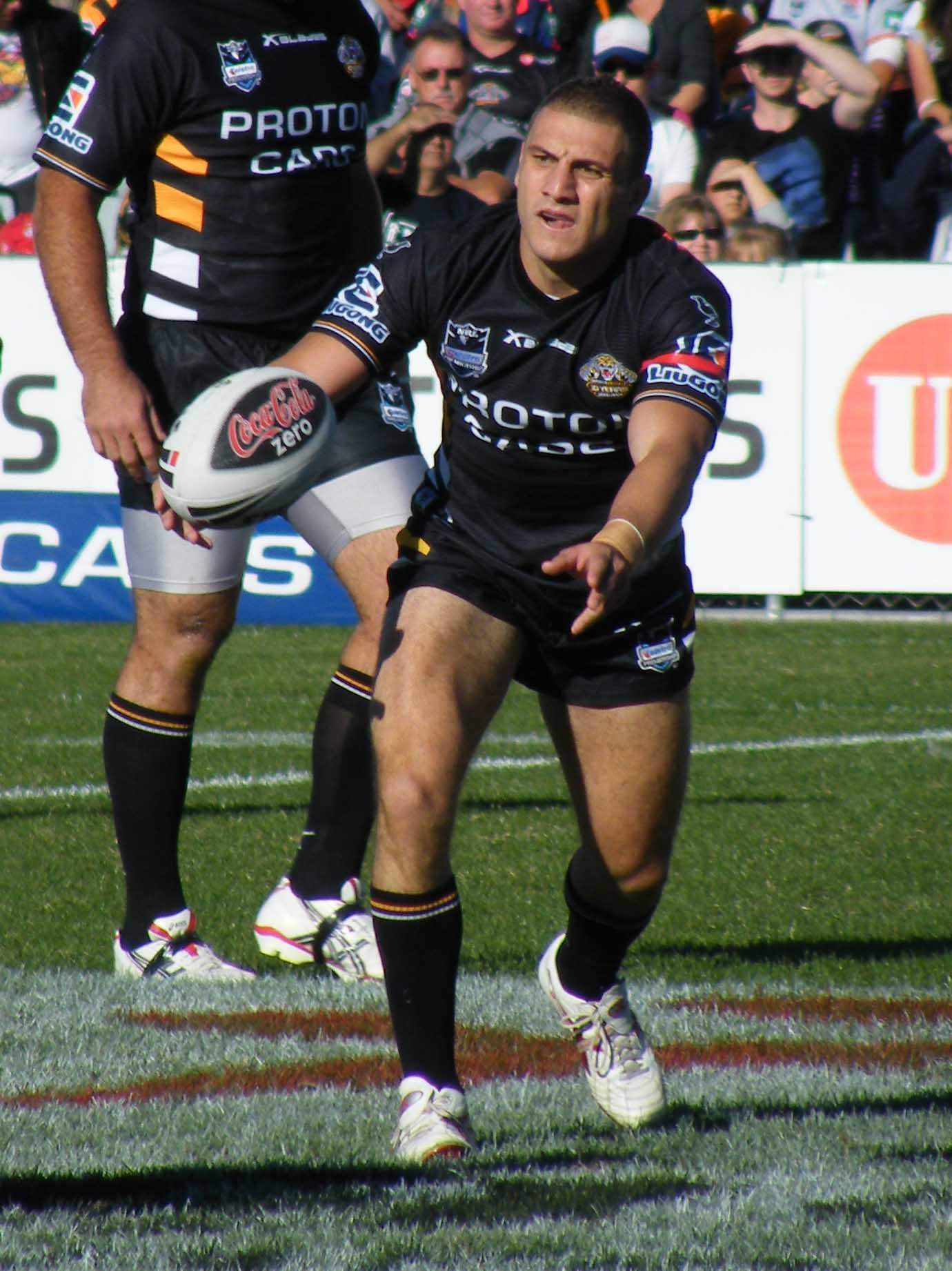
Farah in April 2009

In May, Farah captained NSW City to a 40–18 win over NSW Country. Farah was subsequently named at hooker in the 17-man squad to represent New South Wales in the opening State of Origin match on 3 June 2009, in Melbourne. He played in the first two games of the series, but his performances were described as, "underwhelming." Farah finished the 2009 NRL season with him playing in 21 matches, scoring 8 tries and kicking 4 field goals. Later that year he was named in the Prime Minister's XIII to play Papua New Guinea. and Australia's Four-Nations squad. Farah played in two matches for Australia in the 2009 Four Nations. He made his international debut from the bench in the match against England, relieving starting hooker Cameron Smith just before halftime. A week later, he played in the starting line-up in the team that beat France 42–4.

=== 2010 ===
On 13 February, Farah played off the interchange bench for the NRL All Stars team against the Indigenous All Stars team in the inaugural match at Cbus Super Stadium. He again captained the NSW City team. At the 2010 Dally M Awards Farah came second behind Todd Carney by a point, and was also named Hooker of the Year. He played in all of the Tigers 27 matches for the year, scoring 6 tries and kicking 4 field goals. Farah was named in the Australian squad for the 2010 Four Nations. With first-choice hooker Cameron Smith playing in all matches, Farah made just one appearance, coming off the bench in the "dead rubber" match against New Zealand.

=== 2011 ===
Farah played in all 27 matches for the year, scoring 7 tries and kicking 3 field goals. Farah was again named as second-string hooker in the 2011 Four Nations, but withdrew from the tournament for family reasons before he could make an appearance.

=== 2012 ===
Farah returned to State of Origin football in 2012. In the weeks leading up to the team selection, Farah was contacted by New South Wales coach Ricky Stuart, to explain that his first choice for hooker would be Danny Buderus, who had recently returned to the NRL. Furthermore, assistant coach Steve Roach declared Farah was not, "an Origin type player." After an injury to Buderus, and a man-of-the-match performance in the City vs Country Origin match, Farah was named at hooker for the first match of the series. Despite playing for the losing team, Farah was described as, "one of the Blues' most creative and effective players." New South Wales won the second match of the series, and Farah was named as the player's player. During the match, Farah handled the ball 101 times and made a record 63 tackles, and missed no tackles. The previous record for most tackles in a State of Origin match was held by Dallas Johnson, who had made 60 in a game in 2007. Farah's mum Sonia died of cancer soon after the match. Farah was awarded the Brad Fittler Medal for the New South Wales outstanding player of the series, as voted for by his team-mates.

Making 16 appearances during the season, Farah surpassed Darren Senter's previous record of 86 games as captain of the Wests Tigers. Farah was nominated for the Dally M hooker of the year award. With the departure of Chris Heighington at the end of the season, Farah became the most experienced and longest-serving player at the Wests Tigers. Farah was in the press in September, when he called for harsher penalties for Twitter abusers after receiving a tweet about his recently deceased mother that he described as, "vile." He said, "the laws are piss weak and people should be accountable for their comments." Soon after he issued an apology, when it was revealed that he had earlier tweeted that Australian Prime Minister Julia Gillard should be given, "a noose," for a 50th birthday present.

=== 2013 ===
In February, Farah made his return to the NRL All Stars team, playing off the bench. On 22 March, Farah signed a new 4-year contract to remain with the Wests Tigers until the end of the 2017 season. He said, "As captain of the club, I see myself as having the responsibility, when things aren't as good as we’d like them to be ... I see it as my challenge to help turn the club around, not to just give up and walk away. You might get cranky at some things, but you've got to ride the good times and the bad times. That’s what it's all about."

Farah was chosen again to play for City, a record sixth appearance for a hooker, and the fourth consecutive time as captain. Farah was selected to play hooker for NSW in the 2013 Series in all 3 games. On 12 July, following an injury to Paul Gallen, Farah was named captain for NSW for the first time for the series-deciding third game. Unfortunately for New South Wales, Queensland won the game 12–10. In round 20, against Manly, Farah played in his 200th NRL career match, scoring a try in the Tigers 18–36 loss at Campbelltown Stadium. Farah finished the season with one try from 18 matches. In September, Farah was selected as captain of the Prime Minister's XIII squad. In October, Farah was selected in the Australian 2013 World Cup squad, and played in 3 matches.

=== 2014 ===
In February, Farah captained the Tigers inaugural Auckland Nines squad. In round 6, he suffered a dislocated elbow, putting him in doubt for State of Origin game 1. He was ruled out for 6 weeks, but made a faster recovery and returned in round 10 against the Cronulla-Sutherland Sharks. Farah was selected at hooker for the NSW Blues in game 1 of the 2014 State of Origin Series at Suncorp Stadium, with the Blues winning the 100th State of Origin match 12–8. He played in game 2 of the series in the 6–4 win, resulting in the Blues breaking their 8-year losing streak to Queensland, and game 3.

In July, a feud erupted between Farah and Gorden Tallis over claims by the former great that Farah had told him Michael Potter "can't coach". Tallis said "Robbie Farah told me to my face when I was on Triple M last year on a Saturday show, he told me that Mick Potter can't coach," Tallis said. "I don't go on Chinese whispers; I go on what he told me." Later, Tigers coach Mick Potter said that Farah didn't want to leave the club. "We are fine and we have always been fine, there has been no confrontation at all," Potter said.

Farah completed the season with 5 tries in 18 matches. In September, Farah was selected in the Prime Minister's XIII squad. He was then selected for the Australian Four Nations squad. Farah played in one match of the series, in Australia's 12–30 loss to New Zealand.

=== 2015 ===
With Paul Gallen unavailable due to injury, Farah was again chosen to captain in NSW in the opening game of 2015 State of Origin series. Despite suffering a shoulder injury, Farah was described as, "still one of the most influential players on the field," in the 10–11 loss. The Sydney Morning Herald said "his workload with and without the ball was huge, completing a game-high 55 tackles and cleaning up a Cooper Cronk grubber kick when the Maroons appeared poised to score. No wonder the Queenslanders wanted him off the park." Between the first and second State of Origin matches, Farah made no appearances for the Wests Tigers dues to his shoulder injury. It was said he, "Seemed to have a target painted on that bung shoulder," as Queensland forced him to make a game-high 48 tackles in the second game of the series as NSW won the game 26–18 at the MCG.

In August, Farah was given permission from the Tigers to investigate opportunities to continue his playing career at another club from 2016 onward. Farah finished the 2015 NRL season with him playing in 17 matches and scoring 2 tries. During the 2015 off-season, Farah's contract saga was highly publicised. There were reports of Farah being demoted to New South Wales Cup if he stayed, his relationship with coach Jason Taylor turning sour, and about his $800,000 a season contract chewing up the Tigers salary cap. Farah dropped himself as the Tigers captain and was replaced by Aaron Woods, having set a club record 148 matches as captain.

=== 2016 ===
With Farah missing some games early in the season, it was noted that Wests Tigers had won one game from seven with him playing, and four of six games he was absent from. There was further drama when Jason Taylor chose to play him from the bench and rested him after State of Origin matches. He was chosen for all 3 games for NSW, and it was said, "Running Robbie ran the Queenslanders ragged early on and added 44-tackles to another quality Origin performance," in game 2. He topped the tackle count again in the third match, the only match won by NSW. A week later, Farah was dropped to reserve grade by Jason Taylor and remained in NSW cup until the end of the season. He then signed with the South Sydney Rabbitohs ending a thirteen-year career with the Wests Tigers. Farah finished his drama-filled season with 2 tries in 9 appearances.

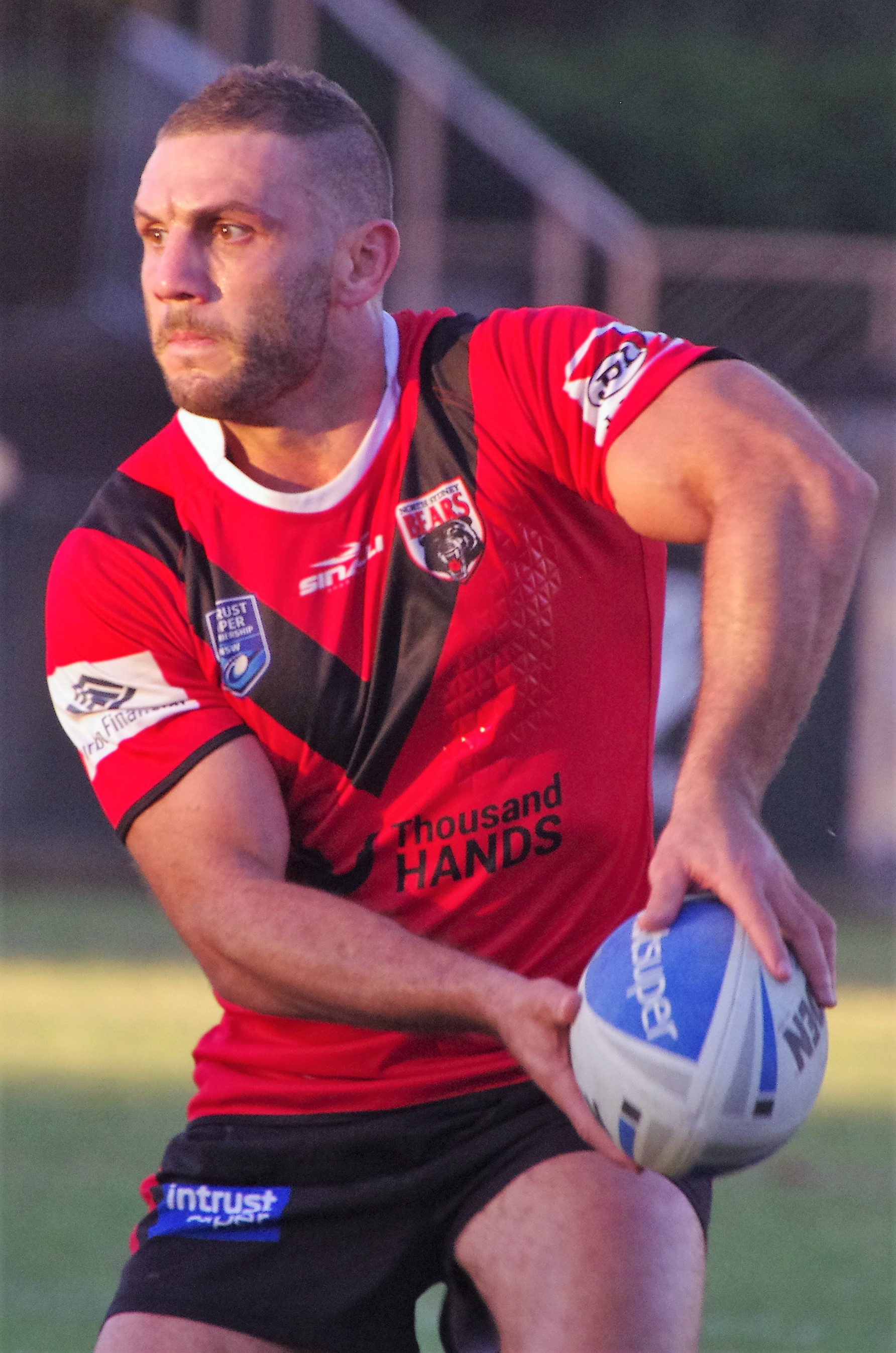
Farah with North Sydney

=== 2017 ===
In Round 1, Farah made his highly anticipated club debut for the Rabbitohs against his former club of 13 seasons the Wests Tigers. He started at hooker in the 18–34 loss at ANZ Stadium. In round 2, against Manly-Warringah, Farah scored his first try for the Rabbitohs at Brookvale Oval. In Round 3, against the Newcastle Knights, Farah played his 250th milestone match in the 24–18 win at Hunter Stadium. Farah played all 24 of Souths matches for the season, alternating between starting at hooker and playing from the bench.

Farah returned to representing Lebanon for the 2017 World Cup and played in the country's first ever World Cup match victory over France on 29 October 2017.

=== 2018 ===
Having shared the role of hooker with Damien Cook in 2017, Farah was demoted to reserve grade with the North Sydney Bears at the start of 2018, with Cook taking on the role full-time. Farah later said he considered retirement during this time. "I just didn’t want to be there. It was hard, mate. Really hard. I don’t want to disrespect Norths because they are a great club … but it was embarrassing for me. You get there, you get heckled by the crowd. There's always a smart-arse." Farah made his first appearance for Souths in their Round 13 victory over Cronulla, filling in while Cook played State of Origin. Despite his absence from first grade, Farah was praised for his performance which included "a whopping" 62 tackles.

On 21 June, Farah returned to the West Tigers on a mid-season transfer, and was chosen as the first grade hooker the same week. Souths General manager Shane Richardson said they would not have released Farah to any other club, but, "The reason we let Robbie go was because it was the right thing to do." He had made 2 appearances for Souths before his departure.

On 21 July, he played his 250th game for the Wests Tigers in their victory over ladder-leaders, the Rabbitohs. During the match, Farah was knocked out in the 71st minute when he attempted to tackle Souths player George Burgess. Farah started at hooker for every game at Wests Tigers after he rejoined the club, making 9 appearances. Farah's contract renewal for 2019 was announced at the same time as long-time teammate Benji Marshall. He said, "Once he texted me late last night to tell me he was staying on again, it relieved the nerves, to be honest. To know he was there for another year - the two old boys at the club - it made me feel a lot better."

=== 2019 ===
Declared the "King of Leichhardt" in round 1, Farah scored two tries and topped the tackle count for the Tigers. He said, "The boys calling us grand-dads and stuff... I try and take that a bit personal, you know. I go out there and try and challenge the younger boys and try and show them that the old fella's still got it."

On 24 July, Farah spoke to the media ahead of his 300th first grade appearance and how he had received messages of support. Farah then used the opportunity to speak about former Wests Tigers head coach Jason Taylor saying "I wouldn’t want to hear from JT anyway, at the time I was told by him and Rod Reddy, I’d finish my career in reserve grade. But I’m here now - 'JT' is coaching reserve grade'’. Farah went on to say "I was running around with the Bears in NSW Cup and I was ready to walk away from the game. It was pretty hard to try and find the motivation to go and play and I thought I was done.

In round 21 against Canterbury-Bankstown, Farah was taken from the field during the club's 18-16 loss at ANZ Stadium with a leg injury. Scans revealed that Farah had suffered a leg fracture. On 19 August 2019, Farah spoke to the media saying that he was considering going against doctors advice to play. Farah went on to say "If we've got to win to make the semis, I'll cut it off if I have to, at the end of the day it's my decision but they definitely recommended that (I don't play again). It's just a matter of gathering the information from them as best I could and whatever risk I put upon myself is my decision".

In round 25 of the 2019 NRL season, Farah was ruled out of the Wests Tigers game against Cronulla-Sutherland but was then dramatically recalled to the team as Wests player Corey Thompson was injured in the warm up. Wests went into the game with Cronulla knowing that the winner would reach the finals. Farah led Wests out onto the field of a packed Leichhardt Oval in what would be his final game as a player. Cronulla won the match 25–8.

== Post playing ==
Farah in 2021 was a hooker role consultant for the Wests under coach Michael Maguire.

In 2022, Farah was named in the Wests coaching staff as an assistant coach alongside Benji Marshall with then coach Tim Sheens at the helm. In 2024, Farah departed from the coaching staff after two years as an assistant.

== Statistics ==
Year	Team	Games	Tries	Goals	FGs	Pts
2003	Wests Tigers	4				
2004	Wests Tigers	3				
2005	Wests Tigers	27	8			32
2006	Wests Tigers	20	5			20
2007	Wests Tigers	24	7	12	4	56
2008	Wests Tigers	17	6			24
2009	Wests Tigers	21	8		4	36
2010	Wests Tigers	27	6		4	28
2011	Wests Tigers	26	7		3	31
2012	Wests Tigers	16	4		1	17
2013	Wests Tigers	18	1			4
2014	Wests Tigers	18	5			20
2015	Wests Tigers	17	2			8
2016	Wests Tigers	9	2			8
2017	South Sydney Rabbitohs	24	2			8
2018	South Sydney Rabbitohs	2				
2018	Wests Tigers	9	1			4
2019	Wests Tigers	21	6			24
	Totals	303	70	12	16	320

== Highlights ==
- First Grade Debut: 2003 – Round 13, Wests Tigers v Manly-Warringah Sea Eagles, Leichhardt Oval, Sydney - 8 June 2003
- Premierships: 2005 – Wests Tigers defeated North Queensland Cowboys 30 - 16 in the Grand Final, Stadium Australia, Sydney - 2 October 2005
- Wests Tigers Club Captain: 2009-2015
- Lebanon Test Debut: 2002 – Mediterranean Cup, Lebanon v France, International Olympic Stadium, Tripoli, Lebanon - 3 November 2002
- NSW City Origin Debut: 2006 – NSW City Origin v NSW Country Origin, Apex Oval, Dubbo, New South Wales - 12 May 2006.
- NSW City Origin Selection: 2006–2007, 2009-2012
- NSW City Origin Captain: 2009-2012
- Prime Minister's XIII Debut: 2006 – Prime Minister's XIII v Papua New Guinea, Lloyd Robson Oval, Port Moresby, Papua New Guinea - 30 September 2006
- Prime Minister's XIII Selection: 2006, 2008-2009
- New South Wales Debut: 2009 – State of Origin Game 1, New South Wales v Queensland, Docklands Stadium, Melbourne - 3 June 2009
- New South Wales Selection: 2009, 2012-2014
- New South Wales Captain: 2013 – State of Origin Game 3, New South Wales v Queensland, ANZ Stadium, Sydney - 17 July 2013. 2015 – State of Origin Game 1, New South Wales v Queensland, ANZ Stadium, Sydney - 27 May 2015.
- Australia Test Debut: 2009 – Rugby League Four Nations Round 2, Australia v England, DW Stadium, Wigan, England - 31 October 2009
- Australia Test Squad Selection: 2009-2011
- NRL All Stars Debut: 2010 – NRL All Stars v Indigenous All Stars at Skilled Park, Robina, Queensland - 13 February 2010.

=== Honours ===
- 2010 RLIF Team of the Year
- 2010 Dally M Player of the Year runner-up
- 2010 Dally M Hooker of the Year
- 2007 Dally M Player of the Year runner-up
- 2007 Dally M Hooker of the Year
