= David Nofoaluma =

Samoa & Serbia international rugby league footballer

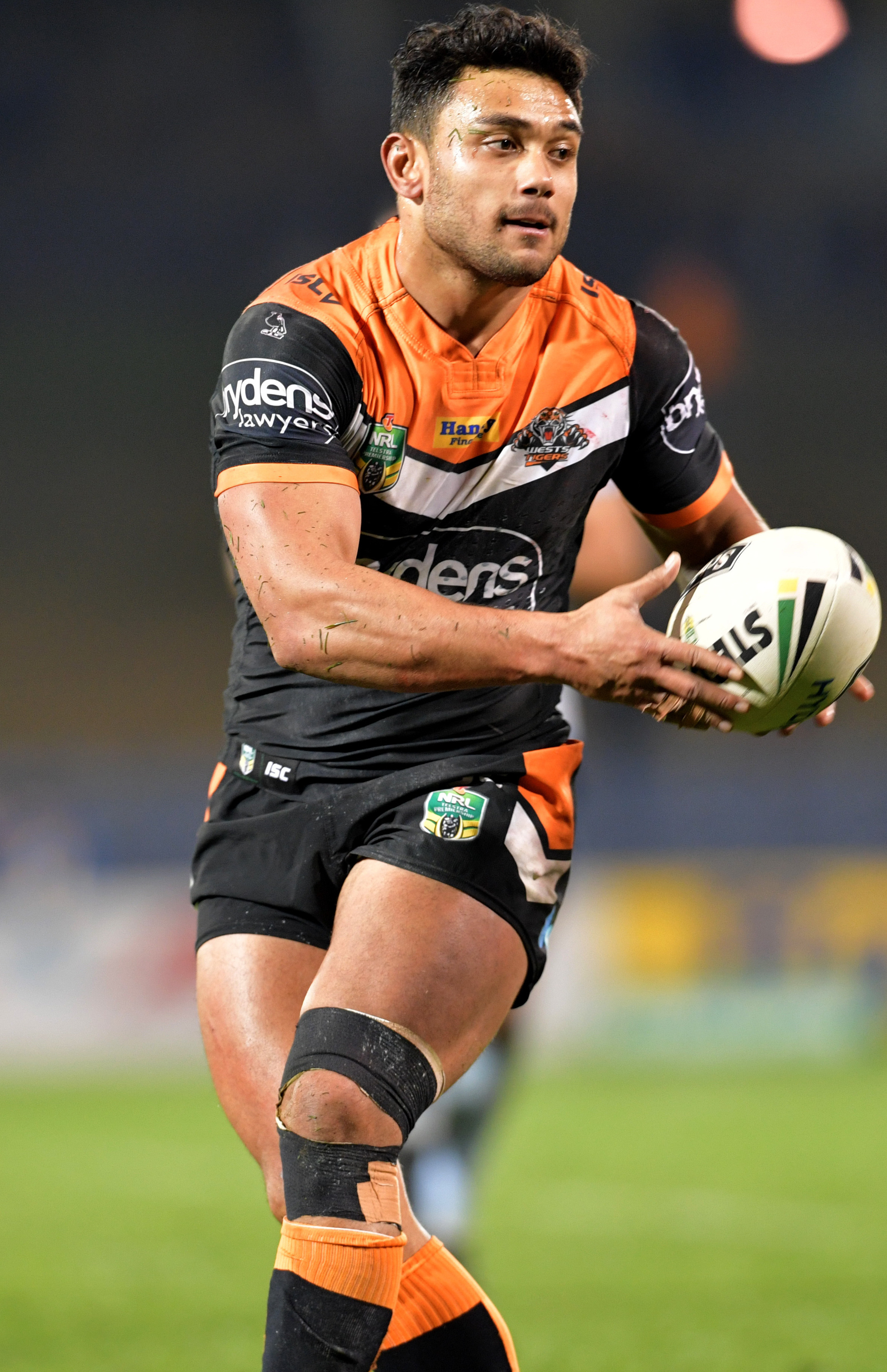

Personal information
- Full name: David Nofoaluma
- Born: 28 November 1993 (age 32) Newcastle, New South Wales, Australia
- Height: 6 ft 0 in (1.82 m)
- Weight: 14 st 11 lb (94 kg)

Playing information
- Position: Wing, Fullback
Club
Years	Team	Pld	T	G	FG	P
2013–23	Wests Tigers	192	100	0	0	400
2022(loan)	→ Melbourne Storm	6	4	0	0	16
2024	Salford Red Devils	2	0	0	0	0
2024–25	Pia Donkeys	12	5	0	0	20
2025–26	Halifax Panthers	17	7	0	0	28
2026–	Newcastle Thunder	0	0	0	0	0
2026–	→ York Knights (loan)	21	15	0	0	60
	Total	250	131	0	0	524
Representative
Years	Team	Pld	T	G	FG	P
2015	Prime Minister's XIII	1	2	0	0	8
2016	City Origin	1	0	0	0	0
2016–22	Samoa	3	4	0	0	16
2019	Samoa 9s	2	1	0	0	4
2024–	Serbia	2	1	0	0	4
- Source: As of 20 November 2026

David Nofoaluma (born 28 November 1993) is a professional rugby league footballer who plays for the York Knights in the Super League, and internationally for both Serbia and Samoa.

He also previously played for the Melbourne Storm and the Wests Tigers and has played at representative level for the Prime Minister's XIII and New South Wales City. Nofoaluma is currently the all-time leading tryscorer and the first to reach 100 tries for the Wests Tigers.

== Background ==
Nofoaluma was born in Newcastle, New South Wales, Australia. He is of Samoan and Serbian descent.

Nofoaluma played his junior football for the Campbelltown Warriors and Campbelltown Collegians before being signed by the Wests Tigers. In 2010, he played for the Australian Schoolboys and also New South Wales U18's team. In 2011, Nofoaluma again played for the New South Wales U18's team. He played for the Tigers' NYC team in 2011 and 2012, scoring a try as a member of the 2012 Grand Final winning team. On 23 May 2012, Nofoaluma re-signed with the Tigers on a two-year contract.

== Playing career ==
=== 2013 ===
In round 10, Nofoaluma made his NRL debut for the Tigers against the South Sydney Rabbitohs on the wing in the 54–10 loss at ANZ Stadium. The next week against the North Queensland Cowboys at Leichhardt Oval, Nofoaluma scored a match-winning try as the Tigers prevailed 22–20. In his third appearance in round 13 against the Penrith Panthers, Nofoaluma scored two tries in the first half in the 20–18 win.

In Round 20, Nofoaluma gained attention for a try he scored against the Manly Warringah Sea Eagles. Leaping for a Benji Marshall cross-field bomb, Nofoaluma caught the ball before being shoved by Manly winger Jorge Tafua. With most of his body in the air over the dead-in-goal line, Nofoaluma managed to place the ball down for what was described as, "arguably the most acrobatic try of the past decade." It was awarded the Dally M Try of the Year. In total, Nofoaluma scored eight tries from his fifteen appearances in 2013, and was described as, "a revelation on the flank." Despite his limited appearances, he was sixth in the competition for tackle-busts throughout the season. He was named by Phil Gould as one of the rookies of the year.

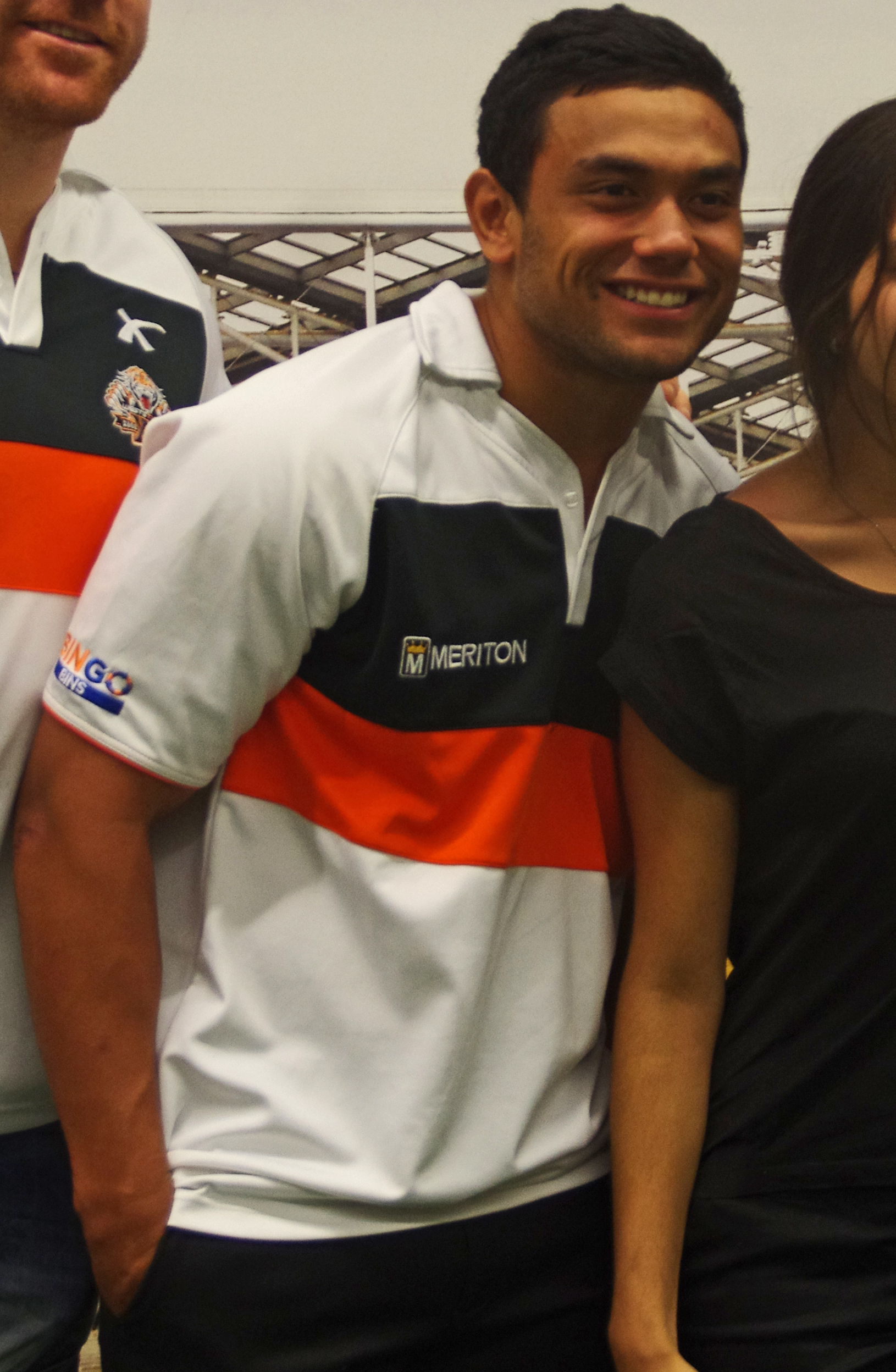
Nofoaluma representing the Wests Tigers

=== 2014 ===
After missing round 1 with a hamstring injury, Nofoaluma returned in round 2, scoring a try in the Tigers 42–12 win. On 11 April, Nofoaluma re-signed with Wests Tigers, keeping him at the club till the end of the 2017 season. In April, he was named in the Samoan team to play against Fiji in the 2014 Pacific Rugby League International to qualify for the 2014 Four Nations. He was later ruled out with a knee injury and replaced by Young Tonumaipea. In Round 18, Nofoaluma suffered a season ending anterior cruciate ligament (ACL) knee injury. He scored 7 tries from 15 matches in 2014.

=== 2015 ===
After undergoing off-season surgery on his knee, Nofoaluma returned from the injury via the Wests Tigers NSW Cup side. A subsequent ankle injury meant he did not return to first grade until Round 10. With team-mate Chris Lawrence moving to the second-row, Nofoaluma played some games at centre before swapping positions with Kevin Naiqama and returning to his regular position of winger. Nofoaluma played in 10 games and scored 6 tries for the season. On 26 September, he represented the Prime Minister's XIII against Papua New Guinea, playing on the wing. He scored two tries in the 40–12 win.

=== 2016 ===
Nofoaluma scored three tries in the opening two rounds of the season. In May, he was a late selection for City, but only lasted five minutes in the match before being replaced after suffering a head knock. Missing just one game for Wests Tigers, he was the team's joint leader for tries scored, with a career-best 14 and led the entire competition with 134 tackle breaks. He said, "I think it was the best year of my career, for sure. I was really happy with how I went. It was exciting to know what I can do when I get more games into me. I felt better and better as each game went on and I think I was playing my best footy at the end of the year, which was really pleasing." Coach Jason Taylor named Nofoaluma the club's best player for the second half of the season.

=== 2017 ===
Nofoaluma received high praise for the first game of the year, with the Daily Telegraph saying, "Playing as if he needed to break 200 metres to get paid, Nofoaluma eventually churned through 211 while also creating several opportunities, through his seven tackle breaks and two line breaks, that would eventually lead to points for others. Hell, the Tigers No. 2 even offloaded—yes, offloaded—five times." In April, it was announced that Nofoaluma had re-signed with the Wests Tigers on a four-year contract. Weeks later, he suffered an injury that required groin and hernia surgery, but played on for the remainder of the season. He said, "I couldn't do certain movements. Even when sitting up, I couldn't get out of bed; I had to roll out. I could have had the operation straight away, but there was no depth in the team, and Ivan needed me out there."

Nofoaluma finished the regular season in the NRL's top five performers for metres gained, tackle-breaks and offloads. He led the Wests Tigers in these fields and was also their leader for line-breaks. He was the only player to play in all 24 games for Wests Tigers, scoring 8 tries. At season's end, he was named as a winger in the Rugby League Players Association Dream Team.

=== 2018 ===
Despite his achievements in 2017, Nofoaluma was a surprise exclusion for round 1, with Corey Thompson chosen ahead of him on the right wing. Playing reserve grade, he scored two tries. Nofoaluma said, "It was one of the biggest shocks of my career so far. But in saying that, for me coming out today, even the whole week leading up to this game, it makes you feel like you've got to perform at your best to be at the top with the best." With Tuimoala Lolohea suffering a knee injury, Thompson moved to fullback and Nofoaluma returned his regular spot in the team for round 2.

In June, Nofoaluma suffered a calf injury that would see him on the sideline for a month, and had to be helped from the field. He later tweeted. "Disgraced when coming off injured to hear a roosters fan in the crowd say "Nofoaluma you cunt. Your a fucking piece of shit". Hope your satisfied!!" Returning in round 18, he remained in first grade for the remainder of the season, scoring six tries from his eighteen appearances.

=== 2019 ===
Nofoaluma suffered a shoulder injury in the preseason and did not make an appearance in first grade until round 11. He remained in the team for the rest of the year, scoring 8 tries in his 14 games. In round 23, he scored his first ever hat-trick of tries in Wests 46–4 win over the Newcastle Knights at Campbelltown Stadium.

=== 2020 ===
Nofoaluma scored two tries for Wests in round 1 of the 2020 NRL season as the club defeated St. George Illawarra 24–14 at WIN Stadium.

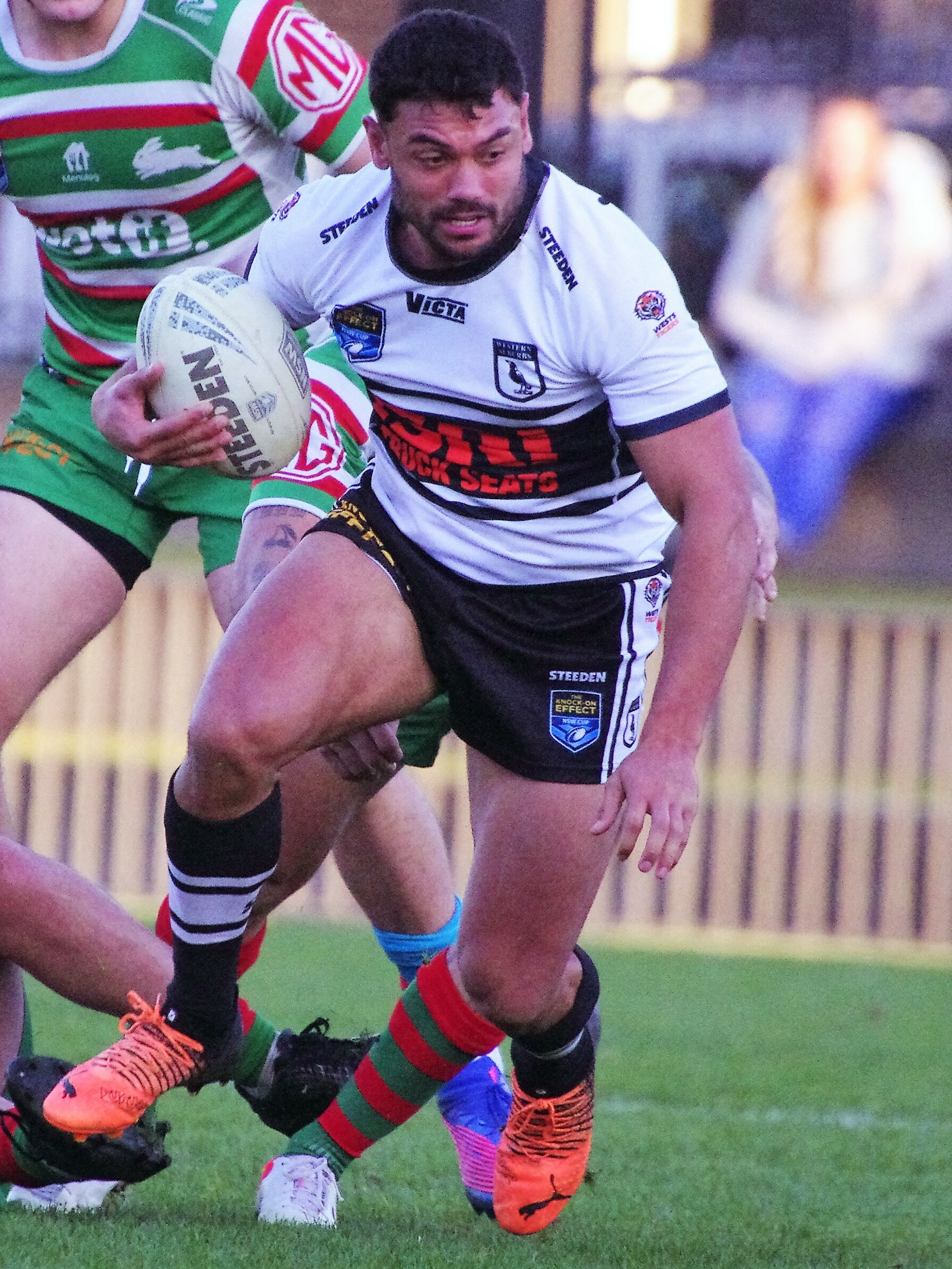
Nofoaluma playing for the Western Suburbs Magpies in 2022

After a further 2 tries in round 4, he led the competition with 6 tries, 2 ahead of his closest rival. In round 7, he scored a third double as the Wests Tigers defeated Canterbury-Bankstown 34–6.

In round 17, he scored a hat-trick as Wests defeated Manly-Warringah 34–32 at Brookvale Oval, taking him three clear on the NRL's leading try-scorer list for the season. He was still leading the competition with 17 tries coming in to final round of the season, but was surpassed when Kyle Feldt scored 3 tries and then Alex Johnston scored 5. He was named as one of two Dally M winger of the year.

=== 2021 ===
With the departure of Benji Marshall at the end of 2020, Nofoaluma entered the season as Wests Tigers' long serving player.

In round 18 against Brisbane, he scored his 85th and 86th try for the Wests Tigers, becoming their all-time leading try scorer, surpassing the record of 84 held by Marshall and Chris Lawrence.

Nofoaluma played in all 24 regular season games, his 13 tries the most for the club in 2021. He led the competition in offloads, completing 50, and placed 11th for tackle breaks, and 6th in runs.

=== 2022 ===
On 27 July, Nofoaluma joined Melbourne on loan until the end of the season. In round 21, he made his debut for them against the Gold Coast Titans. He had his jersey (cap 224) presented to him by former Wests Tigers and Melbourne player Harry Grant. Nofoaluma stated that when he played for the Melbourne club that he had "fallen in love with rugby league again".

In the elimination final, he played for Melbourne in their 28–20 loss against Canberra. Before the elimination final took place, Nofoaluma had the second longest finals drought of any active player. The match was Nofoaluma's last appearance for Melbourne, after making six appearances and scoring four tries, with the winger set to return to Wests Tigers for the 2023 season.

=== 2023 ===
In round 9 of the 2023 NRL season, Nofoaluma scored his 100th try in the NRL as the Wests Tigers recorded their first victory in 273 days defeating back to back premiers Penrith 12–8. Nofoaluma played a total of 17 games for the Wests Tigers in the 2023 NRL season as the club finished with the Wooden Spoon for a second straight year.

=== 2024 ===
In February, Nofoaluma accepted a $300,000 pay out by the Wests Tigers after requesting an early release from his contract. Nofoaluma had fallen out with the club and the playing group. In the coming months he spoke with the media stating that he "got over losing" with the club and that after his loan deal with Melbourne ended, that he did not want to return to the club. There was also accusations that Nofoaluma did not attend training sessions or would show up late to them.

Signing a one-year deal with English side Salford, in round 5 of the 2024 Super League season, Nofoaluma made his club debut against Wigan, losing 22–12.

On 20 June, it was reported that he had left Salford after just two appearances and returned to Australia to sign for Glebe in the Ron Massey Cup where he won the Grand Final defeating Wentworthville 19-12 scoring two tries to seal the game and receiving man of the match.

On 6 December 2024, it was reported that he had signed for Baroudeurs de Pia XIII in the Super XIII.

=== 2025 ===
On 21 May 2025, it was reported that he had signed for Halifax Panthers in the RFL Championship until the end of the 2025 season.

=== 2026 ===
On 18 February 2026 it was reported that he had signed for York Knights in the Super League, after becoming a free-agent as a direct consequence of Halifax Panthers being liquidated. Nofoaluma is reported as being on-loan at York from Newcastle Thunder. In round 3 of the 2026 Super League season, Nofoaluma made his club debut for York and scored two tries as the club defeated Hull F.C. 17–16. In round 13, Nofoaluma scored a hat-trick in York's 30-20 win against Bradford.

== International ==
=== Samoa ===
At the end of 2016, Nofoaluma made his international debut for Samoa, playing fullback in an historic test match against Fiji in Apia.

In June 2022, Nofoaluma played his third match for Samoa, scoring four tries against the Cook Islands in a comfortable victory at his "home ground" of Campbelltown Stadium. With 202 metres running, nine tackle busts and two linebreaks, he was called "the star of the show".

=== Serbia ===
In October 2024, Nofoaluma was named in the Serbia squad for the European qualification tournament for the 2026 World Cup. He played in the match against Wales and scored in the match against Ukraine.

== Statistics ==
Year	Team	Games	Tries	Pts
2013	Wests Tigers	15	8	32
2014	Wests Tigers	15	7	28
2015	Wests Tigers	10	6	24
2016	Wests Tigers	23	14	56
2017	Wests Tigers	24	8	32
2018	Wests Tigers	18	6	24
2019	Wests Tigers	14	8	32
2020	Wests Tigers	20	17	68
2021	Wests Tigers	24	13	52
2022	Wests Tigers	12	8	32
2022 (loan)	Melbourne Storm	6	4	16
2023	Wests Tigers	17	5	20
2024	Salford Red Devils	2	0	0
2024–25	Baroudeurs de Pia XIII	12	5	20
2025	Halifax Panthers	15	6	24
2026	Halifax Panthers	2	6	8
2026* (loan)	York Knights	0	0	0
	Totals	229	117	468

*denotes season competing
