= Chris Lawrence (rugby league) =

Australia international rugby league footballer

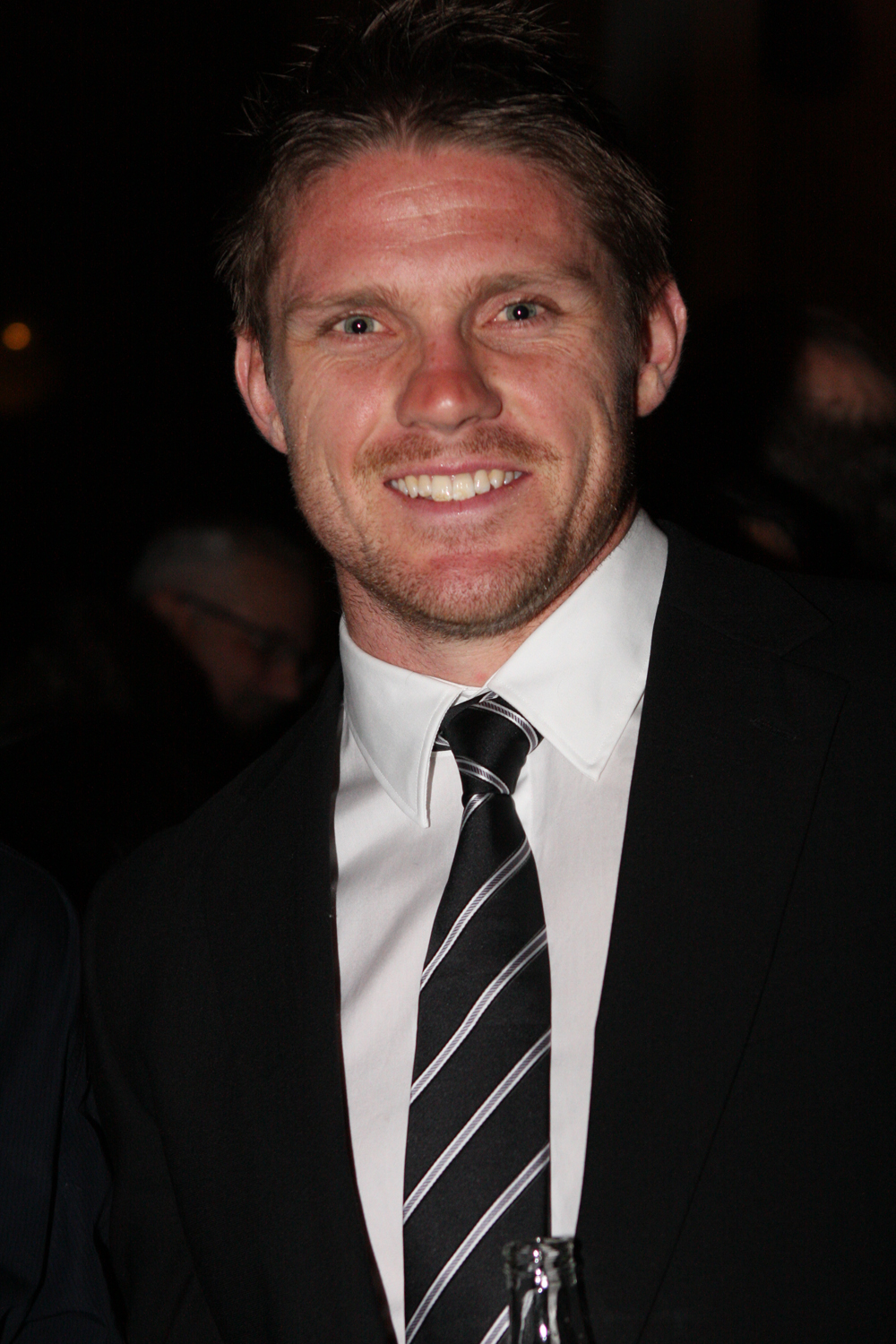

Personal information
- Full name: Chris Stephen Lawrence
- Born: 19 October 1988 (age 38) Sydney, New South Wales, Australia
- Height: 188 cm (6 ft 2 in)
- Weight: 100 kg (15 st 10 lb)

Playing information
- Position: Centre, Second-row
Club
| Years | Team | Pld | T | G | FG | P |
|---|---|---|---|---|---|---|
| 2006–20 | Wests Tigers | 253 | 84 | 3 | 0 | 342 |
Representative
| Years | Team | Pld | T | G | FG | P |
| 2007–12 | Prime Minister's XIII | 3 | 4 | 0 | 0 | 16 |
| 2010–16 | NSW City | 3 | 1 | 0 | 0 | 4 |
| 2010–11 | Australia | 6 | 4 | 0 | 0 | 16 |
- Source: As of 19 November 2020

Chris Lawrence (born 19 October 1988) is an Australian former professional rugby league footballer who played his entire career as a centre and second-row for the Wests Tigers in the NRL, and has played for Australia at international level.

He also played for the Prime Minister's XIII and NSW City.

== Background ==
Lawrence was born in Sydney, New South Wales, Australia.

Lawrence played junior football with Eaglevale St Andrews. While attending St Gregory's College, Campbelltown, he played for the Australian Schoolboys team in 2006.

== Career ==
=== 2006–2010 ===
In Round 21 of the 2006 season, and whilst still in high school, Lawrence made his debut for the Wests Tigers against the Brisbane Broncos at Suncorp Stadium. He is the youngest player to have debuted for the Tigers, at 17 years and 283 days old. He scored a try in that game, in which a second-string Tigers side scored an upset 20–6 win over the eventual premiers, and played in every match for the remainder of the year, picking up two tries in five appearances of his rookie season.

The following year, Lawrence played in eighteen of the Tigers' twenty-five matches as he went on to score sixteen first-grade tries, playing in a variety of positions. At season's end, he was selected to tour Papua New Guinea as a member of the Prime Minister's XIII. Lawrence backed up his two-try performance in 2007 with another double in 2008 for the PM'S XIII. 2008 was the first year Lawrence cemented a position in the Wests Tigers side, starting every game in the centres.

Lawrence studied Exercise and Sports Science at Sydney University.

Lawrence celebrated his 50th NRL match with two tries in the round 3 game against the Sydney Roosters on 27 March 2009.

He was selected for City in the City vs Country match on 8 May 2009, but was unable to play due to injuring his ankle the week before. In 2009 Lawrence was then named in the 40-man New South Wales preliminary squad for State of Origin, but was not selected for any games. The following year he made his debut for City.

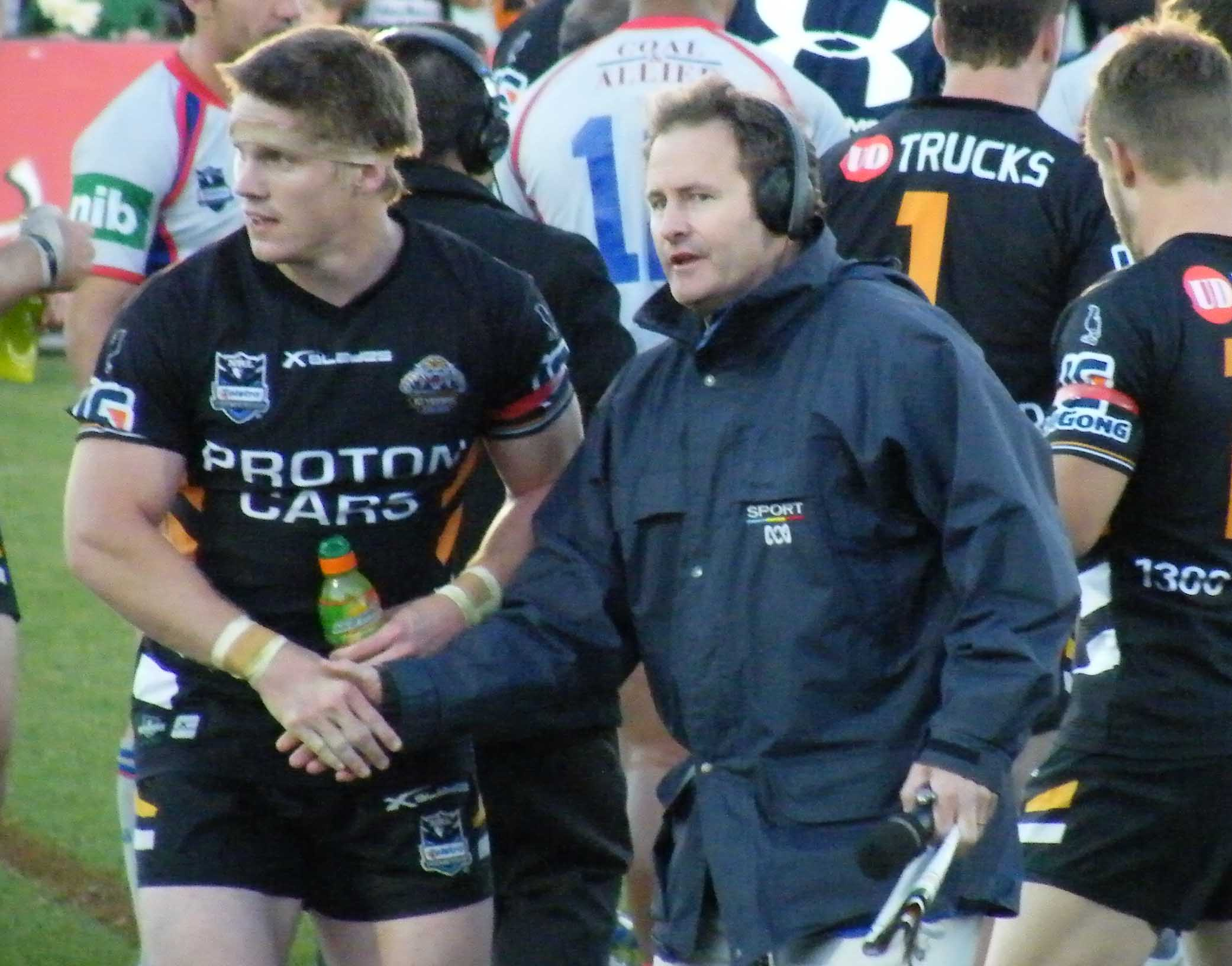

Aged just 21, Lawrence scored his 50th try towards the end of the 2010 season, in what was also his first semi-final appearance. He was named in the Australian squad for the Four Nations, and scored a try in his international debut against New Zealand in November.

=== 2011–14 ===
At the start of 2011, Lawrence signed a contract to remain with Wests Tigers until the end of 2015. He started the season with four tries from the first three matches, but then suffered a dislocated hip that kept him sidelined for over three months. Lawrence said, "I asked the nurses (after I regained consciousness) if (the hip) went in alright. They said, 'No, it wasn’t easy. It took five or six people to get it back in.' So that was probably something I didn’t want to hear; about the positions and them trying to yank my leg back in." A further injury to his hamstring saw Lawrence play in just nine games for the season, but he was still selected in Australia's Four Nations squad, and played in every game of the series.

Lawrence played 20 games in 2012, sometimes at five-eighth due to injuries to the club's established halves. Lawrence admitted his form for the season was relatively poor, saying, "Not making the top eight was disappointing as a team but you need to look at each individual performance and, myself included, we just didn't perform how we should have. I put a lot of pressure on myself to be better. I was happy with the way I played in 2011 but sometimes [in 2012] circumstances through my fault, sometimes no one's fault, sometimes through different things, didn't allow it to pan out that way."

Playing under new coach Mick Potter in 2013, Lawrence had another injury-disrupted season, playing in just 13 games. He had a similar start to the season in 2014, suffering from recurring hamstring problems. He said, "I know myself my form was good in the pre-season trials. I unfortunately picked up an injury before round one and have been carrying that for the last couple of weeks." In round 9, Lawrence co-captained the Wests Tigers for the first time, with Aaron Woods. He went on to play 21 games in 2014, but scored just four tries.

=== 2015–17 ===
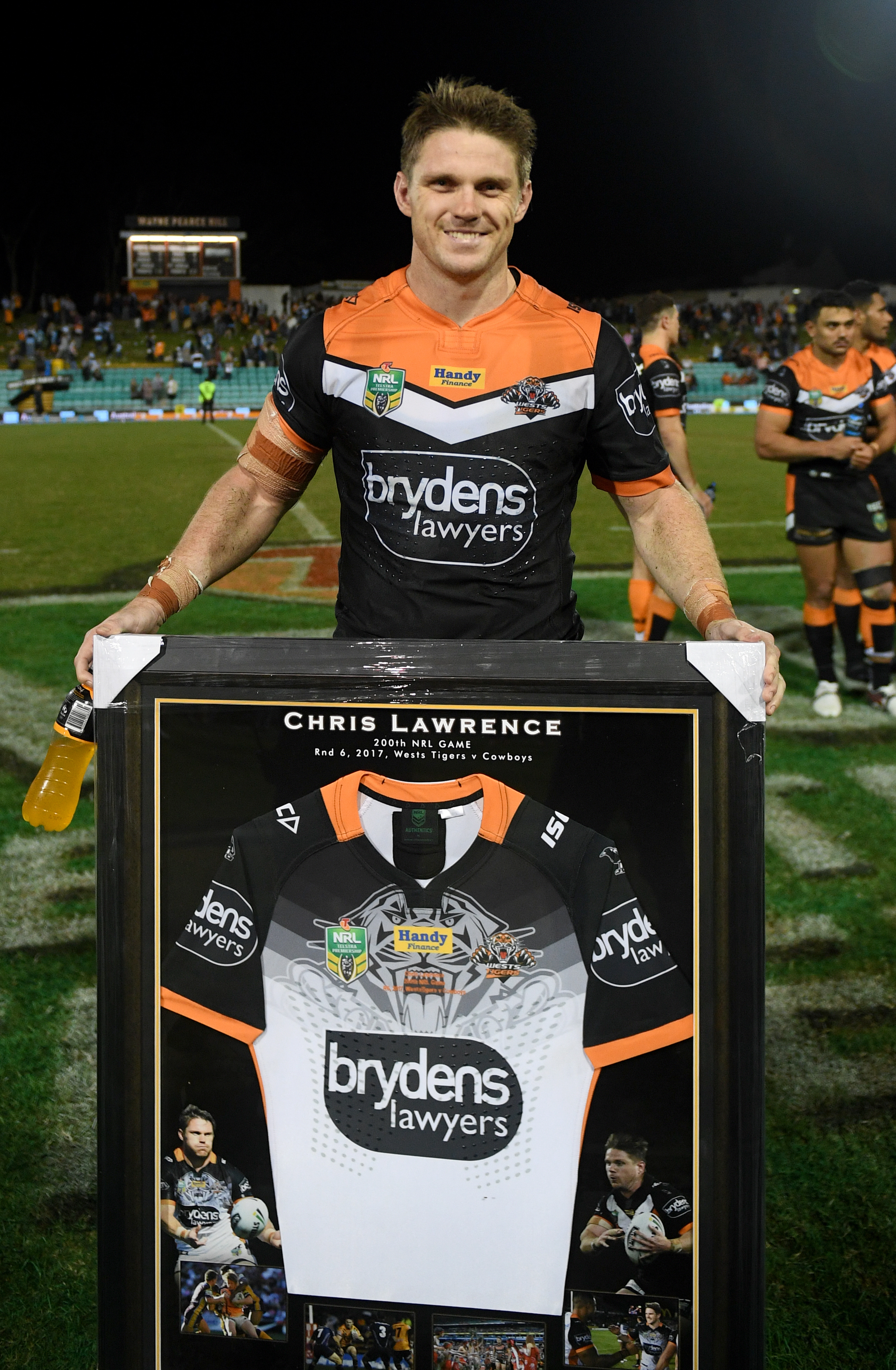

By the midpoint of the 2015 season, Lawrence had gone almost a year without scoring a try. New coach Jason Taylor moved him to the second row with Lawrence breaking his try-scoring drought with two tries against the Gold Coast Titans in round 13. Lawrence said, "I played in the back row a bit when I first came into grade. Sheens put me in the back row, lock, five-eighth, on the wing and everywhere. It's a bit different being one closer to the middle, so obviously you have to do a bit more of the tough stuff and a few more tackles. So I just have to get my body a bit more used to that with the extra work."

Lawrence continued in the second row in 2016, but moved to five-eighth for one game in round 9 when Mitchell Moses was a late withdrawal after injuring himself in the warm-up. With Aaron Woods missing games with injury, Lawrence co-captained the Tigers in his absence. In May, he was named as captain of City. He said, "Representing Australia was a career highlight but being told this is recognition of my leadership qualities on and off the field is special in a different way. I'm honoured and, while we have a young side, for someone like Brad Fittler to think of me to be his captain is humbling."

Lawrence played in the first ten games of the 2017 season, but injuries, including a pectoral tear, limited him to only four games for the rest of the year. In round 6 against the Cowboys, he became the fourth person to play 200 games for the Wests Tigers, and on 30 July, playing against the Titans, he equalled Benji Marshall's record for the most tries for the club with his 76th four-pointer.

=== 2018 ===
With the departure of Aaron Woods, Lawrence was named as one of five co-captains at Wests Tigers, alongside Benji Marshall, Elijah Taylor, Russell Packer and Josh Reynolds. Coach Ivan Cleary said, "I just think it's the right model for us right now. When we started this pre-season, it was pretty obvious straight away that there was no real pecking order. There was no set culture to adhere to. It was all new." With the role rotating, Lawrence was the on-field captain for round 1.

In round 5 against the Melbourne Storm, Lawrence broke the record for most tries by a Wests Tigers player with his 77th, having previously been tied with Benji Marshall. After the game, he said, "Yeah, it was good. More good to get off the nudie run to be honest." Lawrence went on to score seven tries in 2018, the most of any Wests Tigers forward for the season, and his best effort since 2010.

=== 2019 ===
Lawrence missed the start of the 2019 season after a head-clash with teammate Ben Matulino in the pre-season, which required plates to be inserted in his face. He said, "My injuries were likened to a car accident. A couple of surgeons that I saw really hadn’t seen anything like it in rugby league, and that put the recovery in a bit of limbo because I didn't really know how long until I was going to be back. It was a week-by-week proposition – seeing the surgeons and specialists each week."

In Round 20, Lawrence scored his first try of the season as Wests defeated North Queensland 28–4 at Leichhardt Oval. On 21 October, Lawrence signed a one-year contract extension with the club.

=== 2020 ===
On 18 August, Lawrence announced that the 2020 NRL season would be his last, saying, "I just want to be remembered as that guy who got out and gave his all every time he was on the field, who did his job for his team and always put his body on the line and his team first." He made 12 appearances and towards the end of the season returned to his earlier position of centre. For the first time in his career, he failed to score a try in the season, but retired with the club record of 84 tries shared with Benji Marshall, and the highest total by a Wests Tigers centre with 54. It was said after his last game, "any player who has ever lined up alongside Lawrence will say he's the hardest worker and the ultimate loyal clubman."

== Statistics ==
| Year | Team | Games | Tries | Goals | Pts |
|---|---|---|---|---|---|
| 2006 | Wests Tigers | 5 | 2 | | 8 |
| 2007 | Wests Tigers | 18 | 16 | | 64 |
| 2008 | Wests Tigers | 24 | 10 | 2 | 44 |
| 2009 | Wests Tigers | 18 | 7 | | 28 |
| 2010 | Wests Tigers | 25 | 15 | 1 | 62 |
| 2011 | Wests Tigers | 9 | 5 | | 20 |
| 2012 | Wests Tigers | 20 | 6 | | 24 |
| 2013 | Wests Tigers | 13 | 3 | | 12 |
| 2014 | Wests Tigers | 21 | 4 | | 16 |
| 2015 | Wests Tigers | 19 | 3 | | 12 |
| 2016 | Wests Tigers | 22 | 3 | | 12 |
| 2017 | Wests Tigers | 14 | 2 | | 8 |
| 2018 | Wests Tigers | 19 | 7 | | 28 |
| 2019 | Wests Tigers | 13 | 1 | | 4 |
| 2020 | Wests Tigers | 13 | | | |
| | Totals | 253 | 84 | 3 | 342 |

== Career highlights ==
- First Grade Debut: 2006 – Round 21, Wests Tigers v Brisbane Broncos, Suncorp Stadium, Brisbane, 18 May.
- NSW City Origin Debut: 2010 – NSW City Origin v NSW Country Origin, Carrington Park, Bathurst, New South Wales, 8 June.
- NSW City Origin Selection: 2010, 2012
- Prime Minister's XIII Debut: 2007 – Prime Minister's XIII v Papua New Guinea, Lloyd Robson Oval, Port Moresby, Papua New Guinea, 23 September.
- Prime Minister's XIII Selection: 2007–2008, 2012
- Australia Test Debut: 2010 – Rugby League Four Nations, Australia v New Zealand, Eden Park, Auckland, New Zealand, 6 November.
- Australia Test Squad Selection: 2010–2011
- Wests Tigers all-time leading try scorer (84).
