= Aaron Woods =

Australian rugby league footballer (born 1991)

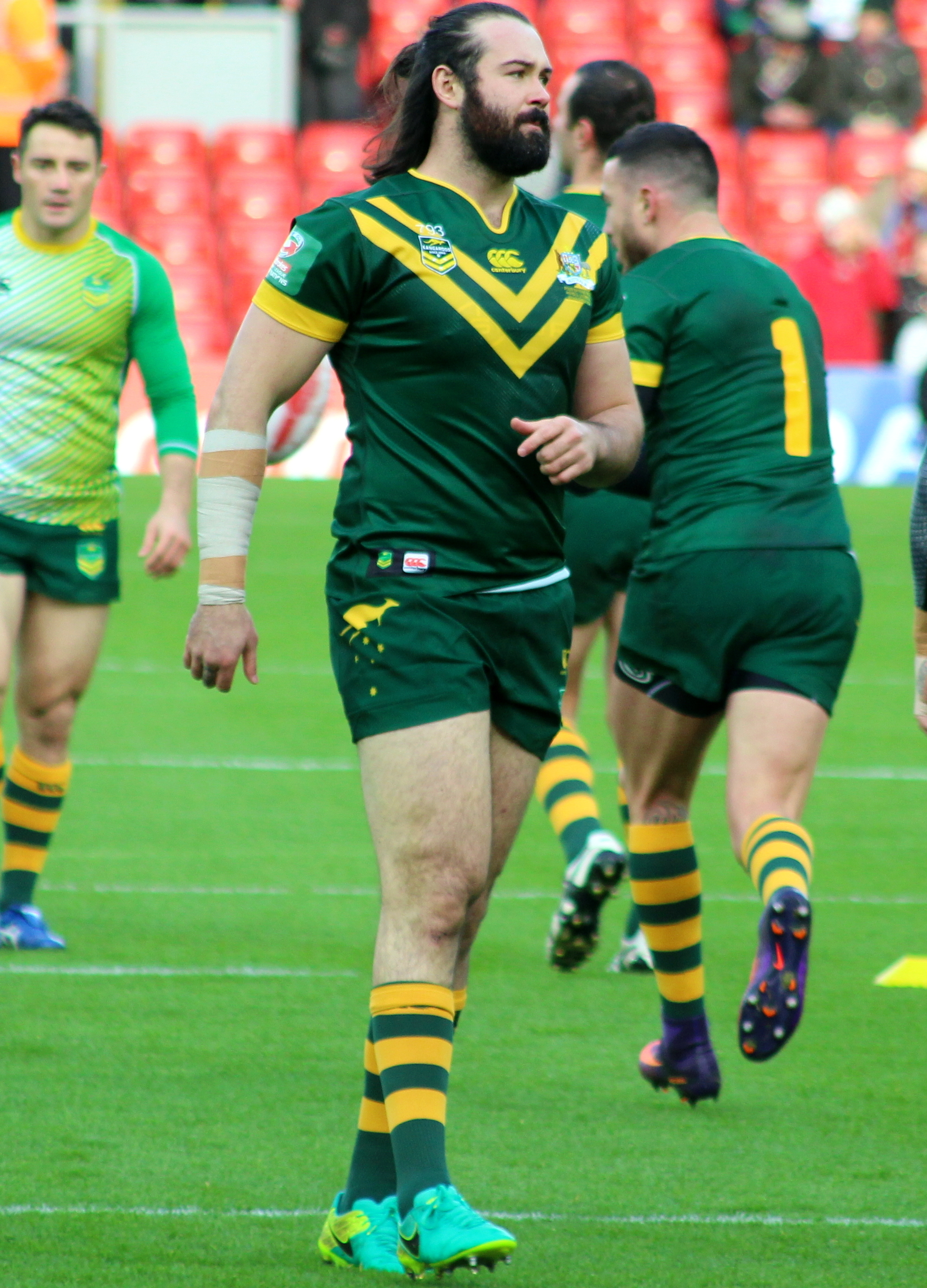

Personal information
- Born: 13 March 1991 (age 35) Sydney, New South Wales, Australia

Playing information
- Height: 194 cm (6 ft 4 in)
- Weight: 113 kg (17 st 11 lb)
- Position: Prop
Club
Years	Team	Pld	T	G	FG	P
2011–17	Wests Tigers	146	11	0	0	48
2018	Canterbury Bulldogs	14	0	0	0	0
2018–21	Cronulla Sharks	73	6	0	0	24
2022–23	St George Illawarra	19	0	0	0	0
2023–24	Manly Sea Eagles	18	0	0	0	0
	Total	270	17	0	0	72
Representative
Years	Team	Pld	T	G	FG	P
2012–13	NSW City Origin	2	0	0	0	0
2012–16	Prime Minister's XIII	3	2	0	0	8
2013–17	New South Wales	14	1	0	0	4
2014–18	Australia	17	0	0	0	0

Aaron Woods (born 13 March 1991) is an Australian former rugby league forward who captained Wests Tigers and played for the Canterbury-Bankstown Bulldogs, Cronulla-Sutherland Sharks, St. George Illawarra Dragons and Manly Warringah Sea Eagles in the National Rugby League (NRL). He has played at representative level for Australia, Prime Minister's XIII, NSW City Origin and New South Wales in the State of Origin series.

== Early life ==
Woods was born in Sydney, New South Wales, Australia and was raised by his mother in an apartment above a newsagent on Norton Street in Leichhardt, a suburb in the Inner West region of Sydney. He has spoken of the influence of the women in his life. He said, "My dog is female, I was a mummy's boy and a nanna's boy, my aunties would bash me and pick on me like a young brother, my missus is strong and stable, my youngest sister is my biggest fan. They've all been great for me."

Woods played junior rugby league with Leichhardt Juniors and participated in the Balmain Tigers Development Program. He based his game on players Jason Ryles and Ben Kennedy. He attended Holy Cross College, Ryde, and represented NSW Catholic Colleges when he was 17. In 2008, he played for the Australian schoolboys team.

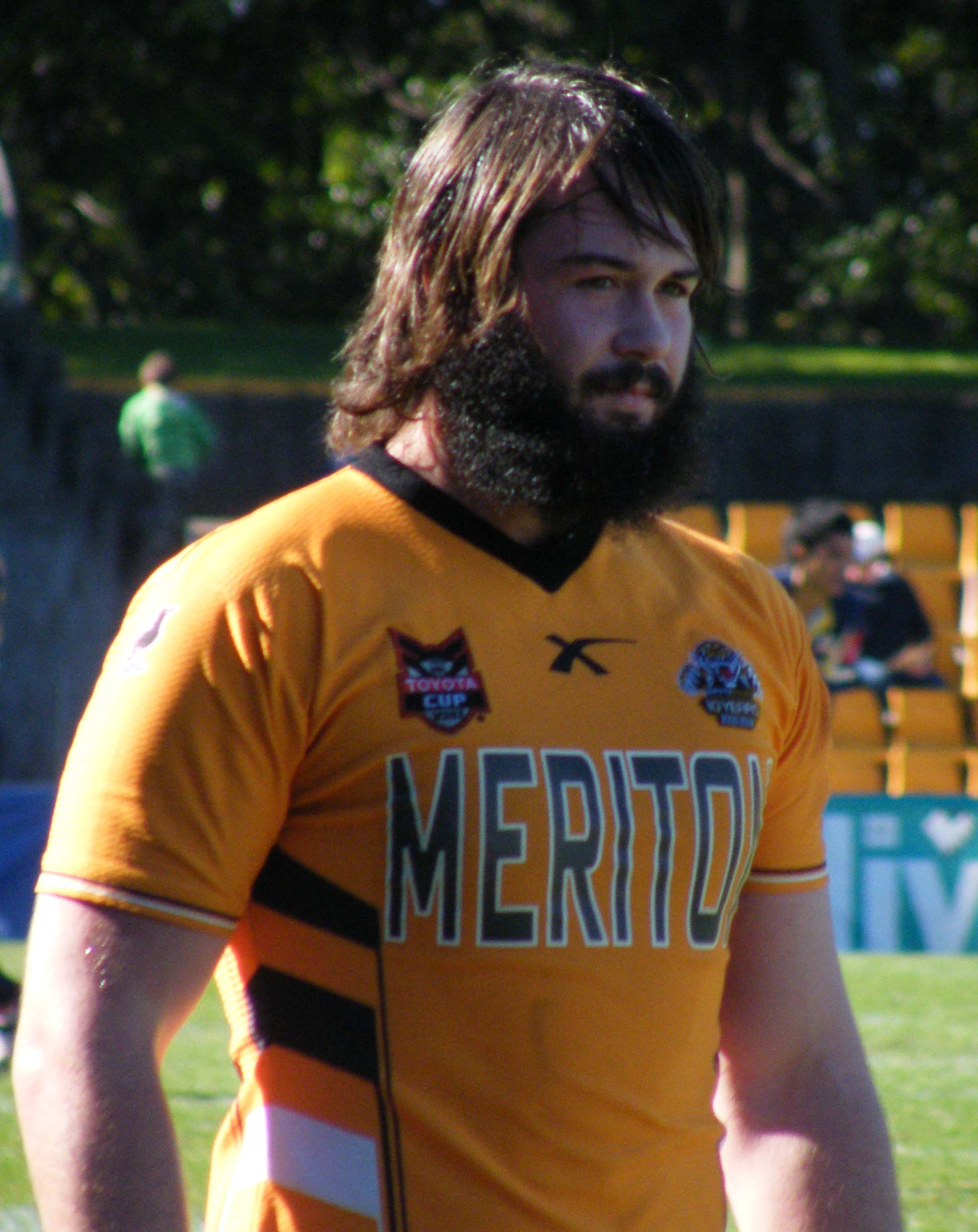
Woods, 2009

In 2009, Woods played for Wests Tigers' Toyota Cup (Under-20s) team in their run to the Grand Final, but 2010 was mired by injury, with his hamstring coming close to being torn completely off the bone. However, before the start of the 2011 season, Ricky Stuart named him in a "Blues in Waiting" squad, for potential future NSW State of Origin players. He was described as one of, "the State's best crop of young talent."

== Playing career ==
=== 2011-12 ===
Woods made his NRL debut for the Wests Tigers at the start of the 2011 season, the day after his 20th birthday. He came off the bench with 20 minutes remaining in the game against Canterbury. Woods later said, "It was a Monday night against a pretty handy side. It was unreal. I'll never forget running at Andrew Ryan and Corey Payne, thinking gee this is the NRL. I got up thinking far out, that was a good hit. But after that the nerves were gone."

Woods scored a try in his 4th appearance. He was a regular in the first-grade team throughout the year, mostly starting from the bench. His first season form was described as, "impressive," and, "one of the few constants in an erratic Wests Tigers' NRL season." He was named the club's rookie of the year.

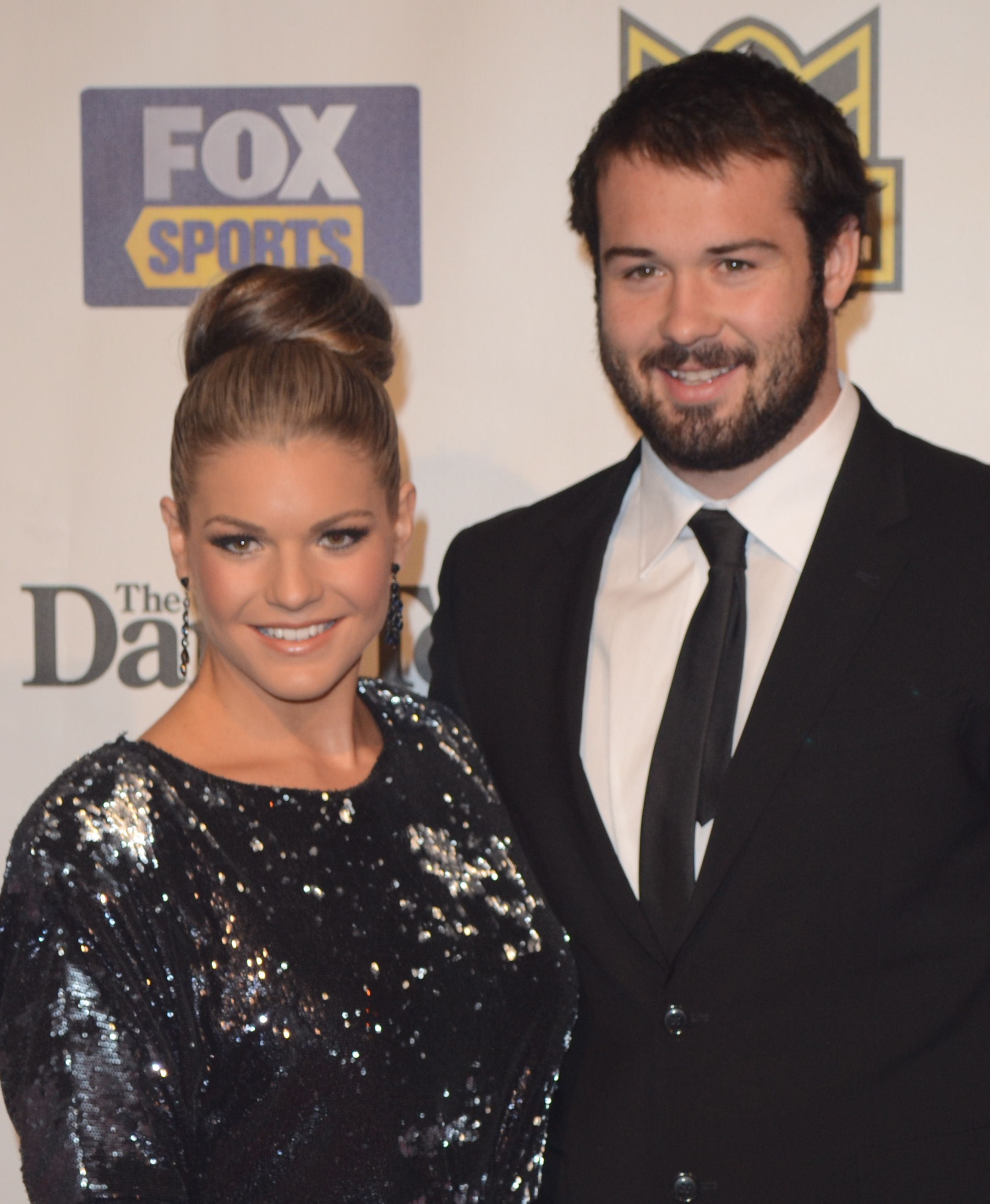
Woods (right) at the 2012 Dally M Awards

With the departure of Bryce Gibbs and Todd Payten, Woods became a starting prop at the start of 2012 season. After seven weeks, Woods made his senior representative debut with City Origin. Coach Brad Fittler said of his performance, "I thought he was the best prop on the field. I'm sure he'll build from this, and whether it's this year or next year, he looks like someone who can make the step up."

Woods was named as a standby player for NSW in the first two State of Origin matches of 2012, to cover for any late injuries. It was commented in the press that he had, "arguably been the form front-rower of the competition so far." Over the season he made 377 runs for 3455 metres and made 808 tackles, placing him near the best in the NRL in yardage, and in the top twenty in tackles made. He was one only 3 Wests Tigers players to appear in every game throughout the season, and was named the club's Player of the Year. At the end of the year he was nominated for Prop of the Year at the Dally M awards. Steve Roach later said, "He virtually carried them [the Tigers] last year, when Galloway was injured. I reckon, along with James Tamou, he's the best ball-running front-rower in the comp."

=== 2013 ===
In 2013, Woods made his State of Origin debut in game two after James Tamou was suspended for a drink-driving offence. He also played in the third game of the series, but saw limited time on the field in both matches. Playing for the Wests Tigers, Woods was averaging a high 60 minutes per game in an inexperienced front row, before succumbing to injury late in the season. Woods later signed a contract to remain with the Wests Tigers for a further three seasons.

=== 2014 ===
Despite a lucrative offer from Manly, Woods say he was unable to leave Wests Tigers. "It was a mental thing. I love to be in the comfort zone, so I stayed here. Also, the Wests Tigers looked after me. I had a few injuries and they stuck by me; guess I was ready to give back what they gave to me."

Thought by some to be the form prop during the early NRL rounds, he was considered unlucky not to be selected in the 2014 ANZAC Test. Woods went on to be named as a starting prop for New South Wales in the 2014 State of Origin series. He was one of three NSW players to carry the ball 100 metres in game one, and then contributed to the team winning its first series in nine years.

Woods finished 2014 as the Tigers' leader in offloads and hitups, scoring a personal best 4 tries. In round 9, he co-captained the team for the first time with Chris Lawrence. At the end of the season, Woods was again chosen to play for Prime Minister's XIII, scoring two tries, and was described as "the dominant player up the middle."

"A 114 kg prop, with hair like a samurai, beard of a lumberjack, a throwback gut from the 70s."

— −Andrew Webster

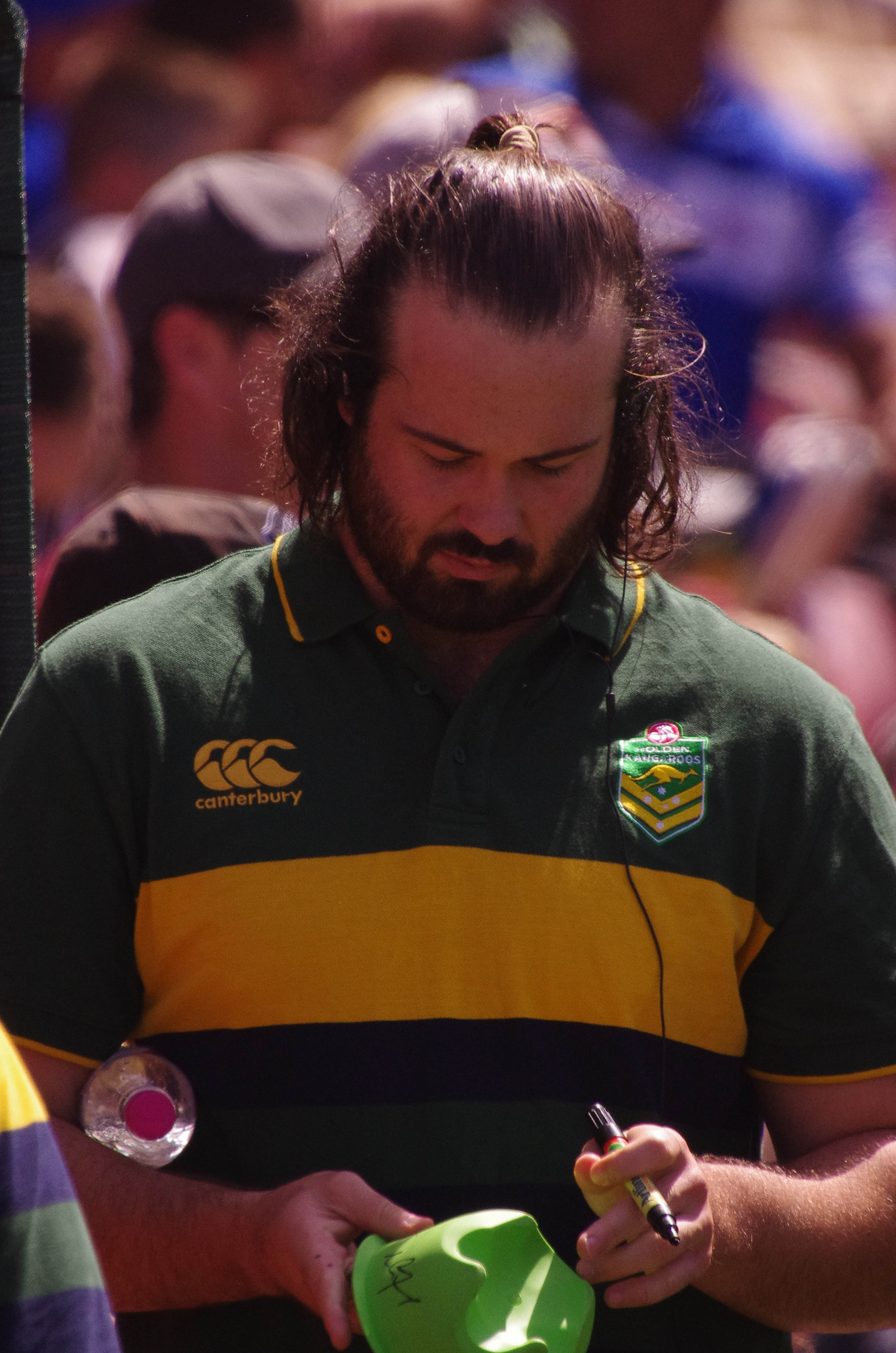
Woods on representative duty with the Kangaroos in 2014

=== 2015 ===
In May, Woods was chosen as one of Australia's starting props in the Anzac Test. Despite Woods making, "plenty of metres" and having, "a strong work rate", the team suffered a comprehensive defeat. A third of the way through the season, Woods was averaging 215 metres a game, 50 more than the next best prop in the competition.

Woods was again chosen as a starting prop for NSW in the 2015 State of Origin series. Playing in a losing team in game one, he ran for 141 metres with the ball and made 41 tackles without a miss, with the Herald Sun asking, "Is there any doubting now he's the game's new top prop?" In the second game, he ran for a game-high 150 metres and brushed past opponent Matt Scott to score a try in the second half that saw NSW take a match-winning lead. Although not awarded the Man of the Match, he was given 3 Dally M points for being rated the best player on the field, momentarily placing him first on the Dally M leader-board. However, in the third match, Woods was criticised for conceding too many penalties in the Blues series-deciding loss.

Despite missing games due to State of Origin and injury, Woods was in the competition's top 20 players for hit-ups and yardage and was named at prop in the NRL website's team of the year. In the absence of Robbie Farah, Woods captained Wests Tigers in 4 matches, all of which were losses. Woods capped off the season with the Dally M Prop of the Year award and finished runner up in the Dally M Player of the Year to Johnathan Thurston.

=== 2016 ===
Woods succeeded Farah as Wests Tigers captain from 2016. He claimed his leadership technique was to, "just remain calm. People ask how the captaincy has changed things for me but I'll never change my role in the side no matter what I have next to my name. We're all equal... I just do a little bit more talking at press conferences, man."

A "near certain" selection for the Anzac Test, Woods was unable to play after suffering ligament damage and bone bruising in his ankle in round 6. At the time, he was the competition's leader for metres gained with the ball. He returned in round 10 and was chosen for New South Wales. The Blues lost the first 2 games with Woods being very blunt when asked by Channel 9 commentators how he felt seeing Queensland win another series Woods said "It's shithouse," Woods told Channel Nine. "It's probably the best way to put it. We just let them off the hook again tonight like game one". Woods was described as, "The best prop on the ground in the first half with several strong carries. The only NSW forward to run 100 metres," in game 2. He had the most metres for any forward on the ground when NSW won the third game of the series.

Making 19 appearances for Wests Tigers, he was the club's leader in hit ups, and had a club-high average of 160 metres per game in attack. At year's end, he was chosen in the Australian squad for the Four Nations, but was absent from the test against New Zealand due to his wedding. Coach Mal Meninga said, "The timing is not perfect but family comes first and you've got to keep the wives happy don't you?" He was the starting prop in all four Four Nations matches, which were all victories.

=== 2017 ===
In March and April, Woods, alongside Tigers fullback James Tedesco and Tigers halves Luke Brooks and Mitchell Moses, attracted media speculation about where the players, dubbed the "Big Four" would play after all of their contracts with the Tigers were set to expire at season's end. With Woods linked to the Canterbury-Bankstown Bulldogs, the Wests Tigers imposed a deadline for Woods to re-sign by 21 April. When Woods' manager did not respond by the cut-off, the Wests Tigers contract offer was withdrawn. Wests Tigers CEO Justin Pascoe said, "We're really comfortable with the fact that we afforded the players every opportunity that we could to stay at the club."

Before the Wests Tigers' next match, which was against Canterbury, Woods was booed by sections of the crowd before the game, but was awarded the man of the match for his performance. Soon after he signed a four-year deal with the Canterbury club. Woods later said, "I'm not proud of how things went down. At the time I thought what I was doing was right, but looking back I should've handled things differently. I was the captain of the Wests Tigers. I grew up around the corner from Leichhardt Oval. I lost sight of what that meant and the responsibility I had continuing the legacy of the guys that came before me."

On 30 July, Woods scored his first try of the year as Wests defeated Gold Coast 26–4.

=== 2018 ===
Woods made his debut for Canterbury in their round 1 loss against Melbourne. Following the game, Woods was mocked on social media and by current players for his new haircut. His trademark flowing locks were replaced by a bob hairstyle which prompted some cutting remarks. Woods was initially surprised by all the attention and told the media "I copped a bit of flack during the week, There was Dora the Explorer, that Lord Farquaad bloke (from Shrek). It was a haircut gone wrong ... but I have to move on; the best way was to shave it off. Everyone is worrying about the hair. I am worrying about playing good footy for the Bulldogs".

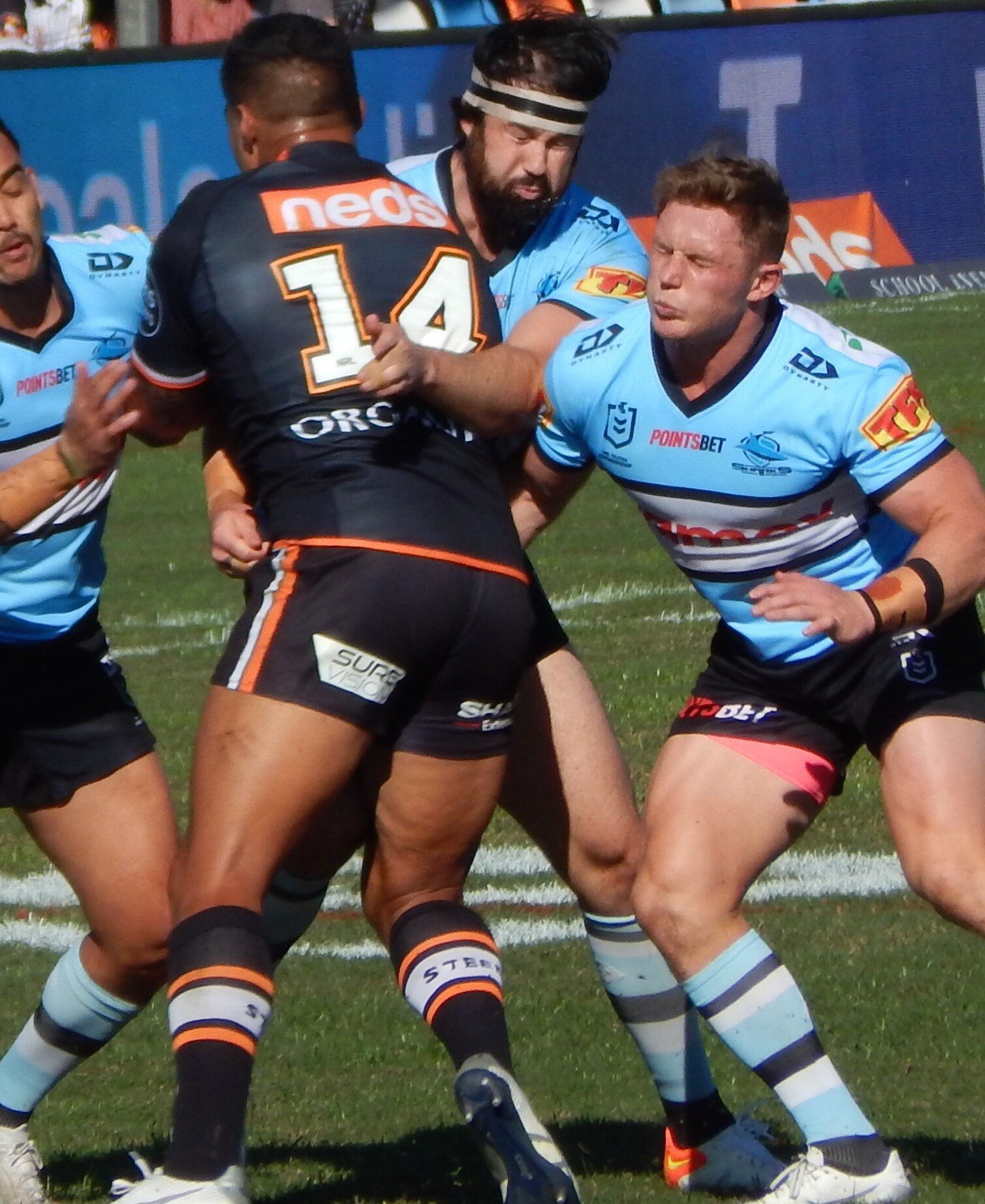
Woods making a tackle for the Sharks in 2021

Woods was not selected by NSW coach Brad Fittler for the 2018 State of Origin series, ending a run of 14 straight games. Woods learned of his non-selection while sitting next to teammate David Klemmer who had received a phone call from Fittler telling him he was in the team but Woods received none. On 26 June, Woods left the Canterbury-Bankstown club, through a mid year switch, to join the Cronulla-Sutherland Sharks. Later that day, his name was listed to face the New Zealand Warriors on his Cronulla debut. He had played 14 games for Canterbury for just 3 wins, with no points scored.

Woods would go on to make a total of 12 appearances for Cronulla in 2018 as the club reached the preliminary final but fell short of a grand final appearance losing to Melbourne.

=== 2019 ===
On 8 April 2019, Woods was ruled out for three months after suffering a fractured foot in Cronulla's round 4 loss against the Parramatta Eels. He made his return in round 15 against his former club Canterbury-Bankstown, playing from the bench as Cronulla lost the match 14–12.

At the end of the season, Cronulla finished in 7th spot and qualified for the finals. Woods played in the club's elimination final defeat against Manly.

=== 2020 ===
Woods played 21 games for Cronulla in the 2020 NRL season as the club finished 8th and qualified for the finals. He played in Cronulla's elimination final loss against Canberra.

=== 2021 ===
On 3 June 2021, Woods was informed by the Cronulla outfit that his services would not be required beyond the end of the season. In October, he joined Cronulla's arch-rivals St. George Illawarra for 2022.

=== 2022 ===
In round 1 of the 2022 NRL season, Woods made his club debut for St. George Illawarra in their 28-16 victory over the New Zealand Warriors. Woods played 19 games for the club throughout 2022 as they finished 10th on the table and missed the finals for a fourth straight season.

=== 2023 ===
On 27 March, Woods made an immediate switch from St. George Illawarra to Manly in a player swap with Viliami Fifita and Alec Tuitavake. Woods made his club debut for Manly in their 18-8 victory over Melbourne in round 7 of the 2023 NRL season. On 18 April, Woods revealed to the media that he was a lifelong Manly supporter despite growing up in Leichhardt and playing his junior rugby league in the Balmain district. Woods also revealed a previously hidden tattoo of a Sea Eagle on his leg. Woods played 15 matches for Manly in the 2023 NRL season as the club finished 12th on the table and missed the finals.

=== 2024 ===
On 3 September, Woods announced his retirement from the NRL after 14 years of playing. Woods announced the decision to retire on Triple M. Woods had been playing recently with the Manly NSW cup squad.

== Statistics ==
Year	Team	Games	Tries	Pts
2011	Wests Tigers	24	1	4
2012	Wests Tigers	24	1	4
2013	Wests Tigers	16	2	8
2014	Wests Tigers	21	4	16
2015	Wests Tigers	20	1	4
2016	Wests Tigers	19	1	4
2017	Wests Tigers	22	2	8
2018	Canterbury-Bankstown Bulldogs	14	0	0
2018	Cronulla-Sutherland Sharks	12	1	4
2019	Cronulla-Sutherland Sharks	16	1	4
2020	Cronulla-Sutherland Sharks	21	1	4
2021	Cronulla-Sutherland Sharks	24	3	12
2022	St. George Illawarra Dragons	19	0	0
2023	St. George Illawarra Dragons	0	0	0
2023	Manly Warringah Sea Eagles	12	0	0
2024	Manly Warringah Sea Eagles	2	0	0
	Totals	270	17	72

== Media career ==
Having been part of Triple M's NRL coverage since he retired, in 2025, Woods began to co-host Triple M Sydney's breakfast show with Beau Ryan and Natarsha Belling (who was later replaced by Cat Lynch). In June 2025, Woods labelled Queensland head coach and former Melbourne player Billy Slater as a grub. Woods had been critical of Slater dropping Queensland captain Daly Cherry-Evans from the side ahead of game two in the 2025 State of Origin series. Woods went on to say “It’s so funny because you watch these blokes up north and they say we don’t get Origin and they use this pick and stick mentality. Well Billy you’ve just turned on your skipper, I want to see the real Billy Slater come out — the grub that we know of. This is a bloke who kicked John Skandalis in the head and got a six-week suspension. Everyone wants to go ‘oh he’s such a nice bloke’. In response, Slater said “I know Aaron Woods, I actually ran into him three or four weeks ago at a footy game and he didn’t voice that opinion then. He actually brought his son over to introduce him to me, when you degrade someone personally in a derogatory manner, you probably don’t deserve one of those privileged positions that we’re all in".

On 28 July 2025, Woods claimed that the story between himself and Slater had been blown out of proportion but stated he did have words with former Melbourne player Ryan Hoffman. Hoffman had called Woods a "coward" live on television in regards to what was originally said about Slater. Woods stated "Ryan Hoffman came out and called me a coward, and then he back flipped and said he didn’t,” Wood’s explained. We had a conversation. I said, ‘look you can call me whatever you want, just don’t ever mention my son’s name again with things that didn’t happen’, because Buster didn’t get a photo with Billy".
