= Darren Senter =

Australian rugby league footballer

Personal information
- Full name: Darren Senter
- Born: 28 March 1972 (age 54) Sydney, New South Wales, Australia

Playing information
- Height: 178 cm (5 ft 10 in)
- Weight: 91 kg (14 st 5 lb)
- Position: Hooker, Second-row, Lock
Club
Years	Team	Pld	T	G	FG	P
1992–94	Canterbury Bulldogs	30	2	0	0	8
1995–99	Balmain Tigers	100	15	0	0	60
2000–04	Wests Tigers	96	22	0	0	88
	Total	226	39	0	0	156
Representative
Years	Team	Pld	T	G	FG	P
1997–02	NSW City	2	0	0	0	0

Darren Senter (born 28 March 1972) is an Australian former professional rugby league footballer who played in the 1990s and 2000s. He played for the Canterbury-Bankstown Bulldogs, Balmain Tigers and Wests Tigers. Senter primarily played in the hooker position. He captained the Tigers from 1999 until 2004.

== Background ==
Senter was born in Sydney, New South Wales, Australia.

== Playing career ==
Senter made his first grade debut for Canterbury in 1992 against Eastern Suburbs. Senter primarily played second-row and lock at Canterbury in his three years at the club. Senter was a squad member of the Canterbury side which claimed the 1993 Minor Premiership. Senter played in their 23-16 preliminary final loss against Brisbane. In 1994, he only played one game for the team which would ultimately make the grand final that season against Canberra.

In 1995, Senter joined the newly named "Sydney Tigers" as Balmain changed their name and relocated out to Parramatta Stadium at the start of the super league war. In 1996, Senter switched positions from second-row to hooker.

In 1997, the "Sydney Tigers" name was dropped and reverted to Balmain, the club also returned to Leichhardt Oval for the first time in two seasons. Senter went on to become a mainstay at the club and played with the team until the end of 1999 when Balmain merged with other foundation club Western Suburbs to form the Wests Tigers. Senter played in Balmain's final ever match as a stand-alone club which was a 42–14 loss against Canberra.

In 2000, Senter became the inaugural captain of the Wests Tigers. Senter went on to make 96 appearances for the club before retiring at the end of 2004.
