= 2008 Rugby League World Cup Group A =

Group A of the 2008 Rugby League World Cup was one of the three groups of teams that competed in the 2008 Rugby League World Cup. Group A was the largest of the tournament, consisting of four teams: Australia, New Zealand, England and Papua New Guinea. After all teams had played each other once, only Papua New Guinea did not advance to the knockout stage.

== Standings ==
All teams from group A (shaded in green) with the exception of the bottom qualifying team will progress to the semi-finals, the other two groups the top finisher will progress to a playoff match, in which the winner will qualify to the semi-finals. Australia were the only team in the tournament to play all their group stage matches with no losses.

Pos	Team	Pld	W	D	L	PF	PA	PD	Pts	Qualification
1	Australia (H)	3	3	0	0	128	16	+112	6	Advance to knockout stage
2	New Zealand	3	2	0	1	90	60	+30	4	Advance to knockout stage
3	England	3	1	0	2	60	110	−50	2	Advance to knockout stage
4	Papua New Guinea	3	0	0	3	34	126	−92	0	

(H) Hosts

== Matches ==
=== England vs Papua New Guinea ===
The World Cup tournament opened with England facing Papua New Guinea at Townsville in tropical North Queensland. It was to be the first time the two nations had met at a World Cup and second time ever since 1975, the Kumuls having only played against Great Britain previously.

The first points of the tournament were scored in the twelfth minute of the game by English winger Ade Gardner who received a short ball from dummy half James Roby close to the try-line and dived over in the right corner. Kevin Sinfield's sideline conversion was successful and the score was 6 nil. PNG responded with a try of their own seven minutes later when Rod Griffin, running a good line, received the ball from dummy half Paul Aiton and crashed over near the uprights. John Wilshere kicked the extras and with a quarter of the match gone the score was level at 6 all. In the twenty-sixth minute PNG's Jessie Joe Parker was taken from the field and subsequently to hospital with a suspected fractured eye socket. Two minutes later England were on the attack and spread it out wide to the left this time for Lee Smith who crossed for a try in his World Cup debut. Sinfield was again successful with his sideline conversion, making the score 12–6 in favour of the English with ten minutes of the first half remaining. The Kumuls however were dominating possession, making their opposition do a mountain of defence, and just after the 35-minute mark, while raiding England's line again, PNG's five-eighth, Stanley Gene (playing in his third consecutive World Cup), threw a cut-out pass to Jason Chan that saw him cross untouched for Papua New Guinea's second try. Wilshere's conversion made the scores level once again. With a minute until the half-time siren Kumuls halfback Keith Peters sent a high kick across-field which England couldn't secure and it bounced up for winger George Kepa who put it down in the corner. The video referee ruled it was a try and Wilshere's attempt at goal from the sideline was missed so Papua New Guinea went into the half-time break leading 16–12.

Less than seven minutes into the second half Papua New Guinea crossed England's line again but the try was disallowed by Shane Hayne for a slightly forward pass. England were the first to score with Smith crossing from close range in the fifty-first minute to pick up his second try and level the scores again. Sinfield's conversion attempt was unsuccessful, leaving the score at 16 all. The English however, with the weight of possession, raided the Kumuls' line repeatedly and scored again in the 58th minute with halfback Rob Burrow dummying wide before passing back inside for Martin Gleeson to go over untouched from close range. This gave England the lead once more and Sinfield converted the try, pushing the margin out to six points with just over a quarter of the match remaining. With Papua New Guinea struggling to get out of their own half, England's Danny McGuire sent his winger Smith over the try-line once again, but the pass was ruled to have been forward. However, in the seventieth minute, England worked the ball to the other wing and Gardner crossed out wide for his second try off what appeared to be a forward pass from Leon Pryce. Sinfield's boot added the extras to give England the biggest lead of the match so far at 28–16. Three minutes later, now back on the other wing, England made a break and got the ball to Smith who crossed again. The video referee was required to check the grounding as PNG's fullback Wilshere had gotten his arm between the ground and the ball, but the try was awarded, giving Smith a hat-trick. Sinfield's conversion attempt was wide but England had scored twenty unanswered points in the second half and had a comfortable lead at 32–16 with only six minutes to play left. This would not be the final score however, as from the restart Papua New Guinea went for the short kick-off and successfully re-gathered, going on the attack. On the last tackle Peters sent a grubber through and Aiton dived on it for the Kumuls' fourth try. Wilshere's conversion put the final score at 32–22.

25 October 2008
19:00 AEST (UTC+10:00)

England	32–22	Papua New Guinea
Tries: Ade Gardner 12' c, 70' c Lee Smith 28' c, 51' m, 73' m Martin Gleeson 58' c Goals: Kevin Sinfield (4)	Report	Tries: Rod Griffin 20' c Jason Chan 36' c George Keppa 40' m Paul Aiton 75' c Goals: John Wilshere (3)

Willows Sports Complex, Townsville
Attendance: 10,780
Referee: Shayne Hayne (Australia)
Player of the Match: James Roby (England)

England	Papua New Guinea

FB	1	Paul Wellens
RW	2	Ade Gardner
RC	3	Martin Gleeson
LC	4	Keith Senior
LW	5	Lee Smith
SO	6	Leon Pryce
SH	7	Rob Burrow
PR	8	Jamie Peacock (c)
HK	9	James Roby
PR	10	James Graham
SR	11	Gareth Hock
SR	12	Gareth Ellis
LF	13	Kevin Sinfield
Substitutions:
IC	14	Danny McGuire
IC	15	Maurie Fa'asavalu
IC	16	Adrian Morley
IC	17	Jon Wilkin
Coach:
(Australia) Tony Smith

FB	1	John Wilshere (c)
RW	2	David Mead
RC	3	Tu'u Maori
LC	4	Jessie Joe Parker
LW	5	George Keppa
FE	6	Stanley Gene
HB	7	Keith Peters
PR	8	Makali Aizue
HK	9	Paul Aiton
PR	10	Trevor Exton
SR	11	Neville Costigan
SR	12	James Nightingale
LK	13	Rod Griffin
Substitutions:
IC	14	Rodney Pora
IC	15	George Moni
IC	16	Jason Chan
IC	17	Charlie Wabo
Coach:
(Papua New Guinea) Adrian Lam

=== Australia vs New Zealand ===
Although this was actually the second World Cup match to be played, it featured the tournament's opening ceremony as it was the first game featuring hosts Australia and was played in Sydney.

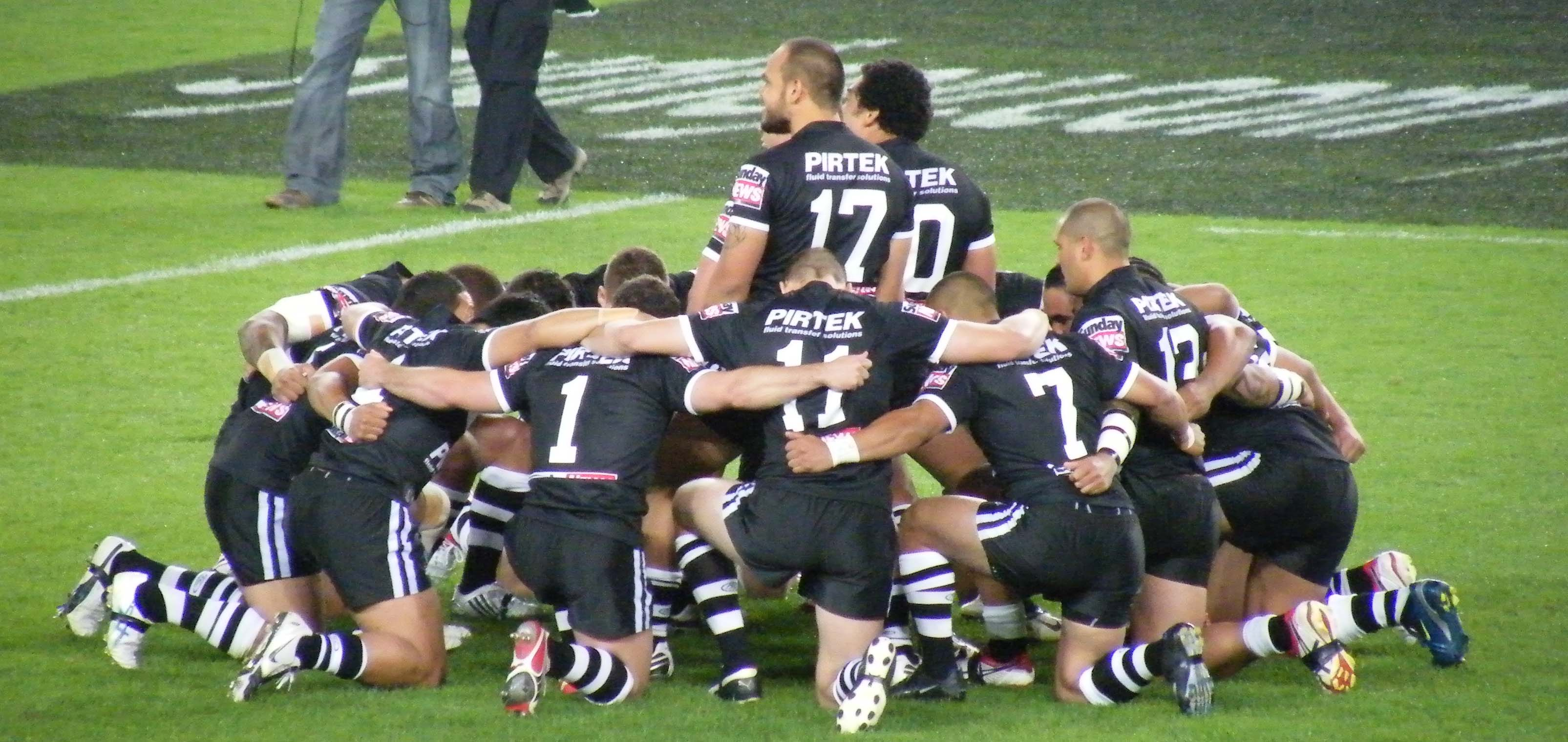
The New Zealand Kiwis prior to kick-off

The first points of the match came from a penalty kick by Johnathan Thurston (playing despite the murder of his uncle the previous day in a Brisbane park) after New Zealand's Simon Mannering held Brett Stewart down for too long in a tackle at the 9-minute mark. Three minutes later the Kiwis were again penalised in their own territory when Steve Matai's swinging arm struck Paul Gallen in the head, the incident being placed on report. Australia opted to attack New Zealand's line and the first try of the match went to Greg Inglis who beat his opposite number Matai to dive over. Thurston's successful conversion gave the Kangaroos an 8 nil lead. Later as the Kiwis were on the attack, second-rower Sika Manu, playing his debut match for New Zealand, ran an inside line onto a Benji Marshall short ball and found a way through the middle of Australia's defence to touch down near the uprights just on 27 minutes. Matai's conversion brought the margin back to two points. Shortly after however, Australia struck back through debutant winger Joel Monaghan whose try was awarded by the on-field referee after the video official referred the decision back to him. Thurston's conversion gave the Kangaroos a 14–6 lead going into the half-time break.

Australia were again the first to score in the second half, this time on the right side, with Israel Folau's arm reaching out over one of his tacklers at the goal-line to plant the ball down in the 48th minute. Thurston missed his first kick of the night so the score was 18–6. Ten minutes later Brent Tate was being taken from the field with a neck injury just before the Australian halfback Thurston made a break mid-field and, as he was being brought to the ground by a defender, threw the ball back for Billy Slater to regather and score. Thurston then kicked the extras, pushing Australia's lead out to three converted tries with just under a quarter of the match remaining. With less than three minutes of game time left the Kiwis looked to have scored a consolation try when Jerome Ropati crashed over out wide, the decision being put to the video referee. The replay however showed that the Australian fullback, Slater, had slid across in desperation feet-first, knocking the ball from Ropati's grasp with his boot just before he could touch it to the ground. In the final seconds of the match Australia scored one more try when quick hands from Slater flicked the ball out wide for Folau who dived over for his second. Cameron Smith was assigned the conversion from the side-line and was successful, giving the Kangaroos a 30–6 victory.

26 October 2008
20:00 ADST (UTC+11:00)

Australia	30–6	New Zealand
Tries: Greg Inglis 14' c Joel Monaghan 30' c Israel Folau 48' m, 80' c Billy Slater 60' c Goals: Johnathan Thurston (4); Cameron Smith (1)	Report	Tries: Manu 26' c Goals: Steve Matai (1)

Sydney Football Stadium, Sydney
Attendance: 34,157
Referee: Ashley Klein (Australia)
Player of the Match: Johnathan Thurston (Australia)

Australia	New Zealand

FB	1	Billy Slater
RW	2	Joel Monaghan
RC	3	Greg Inglis
LC	4	Israel Folau
LW	5	Brent Tate
FE	6	Darren Lockyer (c)
HB	7	Johnathan Thurston
PR	8	Steve Price
HK	9	Cameron Smith
PR	10	Petero Civoniceva
SR	11	Anthony Laffranchi
SR	12	Glenn Stewart
LK	13	Paul Gallen
Substitutions:
IC	14	Kurt Gidley
IC	15	Brent Kite
IC	16	Anthony Tupou
IC	17	Josh Perry
Coach:
(Australia) Ricky Stuart

FB	1	Lance Hohaia
RW	2	Sam Perrett
RC	3	Steve Matai
LC	4	Jerome Ropati
LW	5	Manu Vatuvei
FE	6	Benji Marshall
HB	7	Thomas Leuluai
PR	8	Nathan Cayless (c)
HK	9	Nathan Fien
PR	10	Adam Blair
SR	11	Simon Mannering
SR	12	Sika Manu
LK	13	Jeremy Smith
Substitutions:
IC	14	Dene Halatau
IC	15	Greg Eastwood
IC	16	Setaimata Sa
IC	17	Sam Rapira
Coach:
(New Zealand) Stephen Kearney

=== New Zealand vs Papua New Guinea ===
In the second week of the tournament, Group A's New Zealand and Papua New Guinea faced off at Queensland's Gold Coast. It was the first time the two countries had met since the Kiwis had a 64-0 win over the Kumuls at Palmerston North in 1996. Papua New Guinea made no changes to their side from the previous match, while New Zealand were without Steve Matai who was serving a suspension due to his high tackle on Australia's Paul Gallen in their previous match. This meant Krisnan Inu got his chance to play, and Sika Manu and Dene Halatau were also replaced by Isaac Luke and David Fa'alogo.

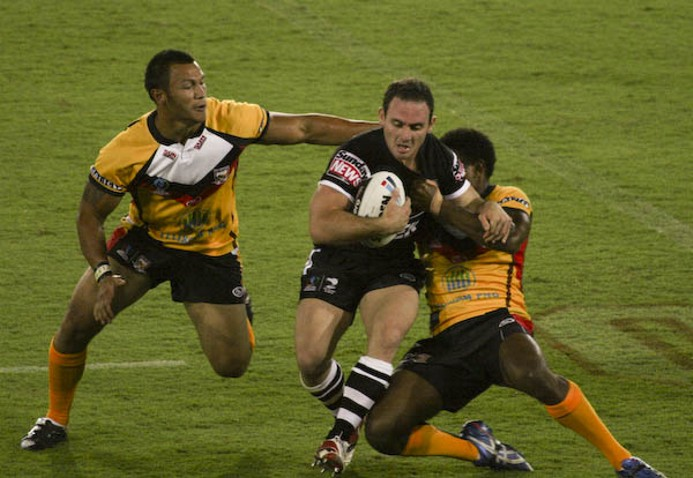
Lance Hohaia trying to break through the Kumuls' defence.

The first points came in the ninth minute when New Zealand, from fifteen metres out, moved the ball through the hands from the right side of the field out to the left, catching PNG's defence outnumbered so Jermoe Ropati could crossed untouched. Krisnan Inu's conversion attempt missed, leaving the score at 4 nil. Less than four minutes later it was Ropati again who fell over PNG's line, but was held up in goal. In the sixteenth minute the Kiwis again moved the ball out wide through the hands, this time to the right side where Simon Mannering was able to pass untouched between the thinly stretched defence to score. Inu kicked the extras and New Zealand were leading 10 nil. Mannering scored his second try eight minutes later, again on the right side of the field, after taking on the defensive line and breaking through. Inu's conversion was successful, taking New Zealand's lead out to 16 nil with fourteen minutes of the first half remaining. New Zealand's defence then withstood a series of assaults on their line when Papua New Guinea got repeat sets. Back in the Kumuls' half though, the Kiwis scored in the thirty-fourth minute, again on the right wing, when Benji Marshall threw an enormous cut out pass over to Sam Perrett who jogged over unchallenged by PNG's severely outnumbered defence. Inu's conversion made it 22 unanswered points by New Zealand and this would remain the scoreline at the half time break.

Marshall, New Zealand's key play maker, sat out the second half to ice a tightened hamstring muscle and after seven minutes it was Papua New Guinea who got the first points. On the left side of the field Neville Costigan got a pass out of a tackle to Jessie Joe Parker who also managed to pass from a tackle back inside for winger David Moore to race through some defenders and over the try-line, improving his kicker's field position by putting the ball down behind the uprights. Wilshere's simple conversion made the score 22–6. In the fifty-sixth minute, New Zealand returned to their try-scoring ways when Isaac Luke ran from dummy half thirty-seven metres out from Papua New Guinea's line and evaded a few defenders to score. Inu, however, missed the simple conversion. The Kiwis crossed again in the fifty-ninth minute from close range, Fa'alogo receiving a short ball from Fien and barging over the line. Isaac Luke missed the conversion so the score was 30–6 with a quarter of the match remaining. Less than ten minutes later, Adam Blair scored in the same spot, taking a short ball from dummy half Leuluai at close range and crashing over. Inu, making a return to the goal-kicking job, successfully converted the try. In the seventy-first minute, New Zealand were attacking again when Luke kicked high and to the left wing. Inu leapt for it but couldn't catch the ball and it ricocheted off the PNG defence before coming down for Sam Perrett to regather and ground. After examination by the video referee of a possible New Zealand knock on, the try was awarded due to the benefit of the doubt. Inu's conversion attempt was successful, bringing the score to 42–6. The Kiwis got one more try in the match when Greg Eastwood ran the ball from over thirty metres out, stepping and brushing past some defenders to score under the posts. The extras were kicked by Inu, leaving the final score at 48–6.

The loss for Papua New Guinea effectively ended their hopes of making the semi-finals, now requiring a win over Australia by an enormous margin to do so.

1 November 2008
19:00 AEST (UTC+10:00)

New Zealand	48–6	Papua New Guinea
Tries: Simon Mannering (2); Sam Perrett (2); Jerome Ropati; Issac Luke; David Fa'alogo; Adam Blair; Greg Eastwood; Goals: Krisnan Inu (5)	Report	Tries: David Moore; Goals: John Wilshire (1)

Robina Stadium, Gold Coast
Attendance: 11,278
Referee: Steve Ganson (England)
Player of the Match: Adam Blair (New Zealand)

New Zealand	Papua New Guinea

FB	1	Lance Hohaia
RW	2	Sam Perrett
RC	3	Krisnan Inu
LC	4	Jerome Ropati
LW	5	Manu Vatuvei
FE	6	Benji Marshall
HB	7	Thomas Leuluai
PR	8	Nathan Cayless (c)
HK	9	Nathan Fien
PR	10	Adam Blair
SR	11	Simon Mannering
SR	12	Setaimata Sa
LK	13	Jeremy Smith
Substitutions:
IC	14	Isaac Luke
IC	15	Greg Eastwood
IC	16	David Fa'alogo
IC	17	Sika Manu
Coach:
(New Zealand) Stephen Kearney

FB	1	John Wilshere (c)
RW	2	David Mead
RC	3	Jessie Joe Parker
LC	4	Tu'u Maori
LW	5	George Keppa
FE	6	Stanley Gene
HB	7	Keith Peters
PR	8	Makali Aizue
HK	9	Paul Aiton
PR	10	Trevor Exton
SR	11	Neville Costigan
SR	12	James Nightingale
LK	13	Rod Griffin
Substitutions:
IC	14	George Moni
IC	15	Jason Chan
IC	16	Rodney Pora
IC	17	Charlie Wabo
Coach:
(Papua New Guinea) Adrian Lam

=== Australia vs England ===
2 November 2008
20:00 ADST (UTC+11:00)

Australia	52–4	England
Tries: Billy Slater 5', 63', 70'; Greg Inglis 10', 33'; Anthony Laffranchi 37', 77'; Joel Monaghan 56'; Scott Prince 65'; Goals: Scott Prince (8/10)	Report	Tries: James Roby 20'; Goals: Kevin Sinfield (0/1)

Docklands Stadium, Melbourne
Attendance: 36,297
Referee: Tony Archer (Australia)
Player of the Match: Billy Slater (Australia)

Australia	England

FB	1	Billy Slater
RW	2	Joel Monaghan
RC	3	Greg Inglis
LC	4	Israel Folau
LW	5	Brent Tate
FE	6	Darren Lockyer (c)
HB	7	Scott Prince
PR	8	Steve Price
HK	9	Cameron Smith
PR	10	Petero Civoniceva
SR	11	Anthony Laffranchi
SR	12	Glenn Stewart
LK	13	Paul Gallen
Substitutions:
IC	14	Karmichael Hunt
IC	15	Brent Kite
IC	16	Anthony Tupou
IC	17	Josh Perry
Coach:
(Australia) Ricky Stuart

FB	1	Paul Wellens
RW	2	Ade Gardner
RC	3	Martin Gleeson
LC	4	Keith Senior
LW	5	Mark Calderwood
SO	6	Leon Pryce
SH	7	Rob Burrow
PR	8	Adrian Morley
HK	9	James Roby
PR	10	James Graham
SR	11	Gareth Ellis
SR	12	Jamie Peacock (c)
LF	13	Kevin Sinfield
Substitutions:
IC	14	Danny McGuire
IC	15	Maurie Fa'asavalu
IC	16	Gareth Hock
IC	17	Jon Wilkin
Coach:
(Australia) Tony Smith

=== England vs New Zealand ===
The last time the New Zealand and England sides met was in the semi-final of the 2000 World Cup, with the Kiwis winning 49 to 6. So far in this tournament both sides had defeated Papua New Guinea and lost to Australia. Changes to the New Zealand side were: Jason Nightingale in for Sam Perrett on the right wing; Steve Matai, after serving his one-match suspension, regained his place at right centre from Krisnan Inu; Evarn Tuimivave replaced Nathan Cayless in the front row (with Benji Marshall being named captain); David Fa'alogo was moved from the bench into Setaimata Sa's spot in the second row; Sam Rapira was dropped with David Kidwell and Bronson Harrison added to the bench.

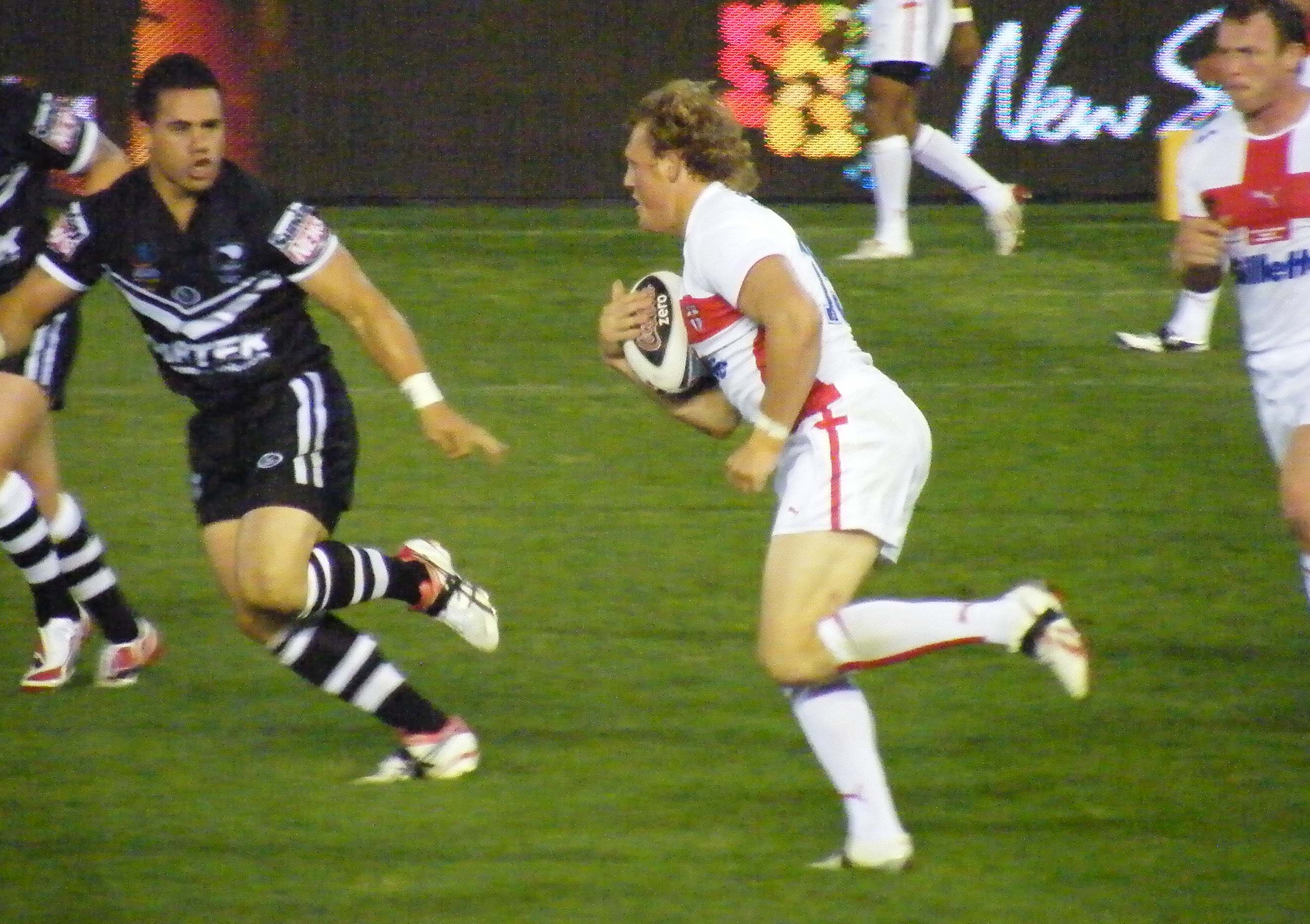
England's Ben Westwood running at the New Zealand defence.

England were the first to score after getting repeat sets which took them down close to New Zealand's line where hooker Mickey Higham pushed through the defence from dummy half in the 4th minute. The simple conversion was kicked by Rob Purdham so the score was 6 nil. Less than 4 minutes later England were working the ball out from their own 10-metre line when they decided to pass out wide to their centre Keith Senior, who beat the defence and raced down along the left wing. He then passed back inside for Rob Burrow running up in support and the diminutive halfback was away for England's second try. Purdham's conversion was successful so England were in front 12 nil with under ten minutes of the match gone. However New Zealand struck back just on 13 minutes after a break made by centre Jerome Ropati from a scrum win mid-field afforded Manu Vatuvei a run at the disorganised defence from within ten metres, the giant winger barging his way over for his first try of the tournament. The conversion attempt by Steve Matai was wide, so the score remained 12–4 in favour of England. At the sixteen-minute mark from a scrum win the English stand-off, Martin Gleeson made a sudden break from 30 metres out and was into open space, his run good enough for the momentum to drag him and his tackler over the try-line. The video referee awarded the four points and Purdham kicked the extra two so England's lead was pushed out to 18–4. In the 20th minute, the Kiwis were down close to the English try-line when New Zealand fullback Lance Hohaia dummied and stepped his way through the defensive line and fought his way through his tacklers to force the ball down, the video referee awarding the try after some deliberation. The kick from Matai missed so the score was 18–8 with three quarters of the match still remaining. Six minutes later, England were back deep in New Zealand's territory when Burrow at first-receiver and on the last tackle stepped and dashed through the defence to score his second try of the night. Purdham's conversion put the score at England 24, New Zealand 8. A few minutes later play was halted while Kiwi centre Steve Matai was taken from the field after falling into a tackle awkwardly and injuring his neck. New Zealand, ten metres into England's half and before the first tackle of a new set of six, offloaded from some tackles and kept the ball alive before sending it out to Jason Nightingale on the right wing where he dived over in the corner. Isaac Luke was given the sideline conversion attempt and kicked it, putting New Zealand back in the contest at 24–14, with three minutes of the first half remaining. No more points were scored before the break.

In the 47th minute, New Zealand were on the attack and were the first to score in the second half when a long pass from Hohaia out to Vatuvei saw him dive over untouched in the left corner for his second try of the match. The video referee awarded the try and Luke's sideline conversion attempt was wide, so the score was New Zealand 18, England 24. The Kiwi's then continued dominating possession and field position and in the 55th minute Vatuvei scored his 3rd, again diving over untouched in the corner after receiving a long ball from Hohaia. Once more Luke had to kick for goal from the sideline and this time was successful so the scores were level at 24 all. In the 69th minute, Luke gained his team a penalty when he was given a push by an England player while running in to contest a bomb and fell to the ground. The Kiwis decided to take the kick from in front of the posts and Luke got the two points which put New Zealand in the lead for the first time at 26–24. New Zealand were attacking England's line again in the 75th minute when an English defender fumbled an intercept chance and from the confusion Nathan Fein, who was playing on despite a broken nose, picked up the ball and crashed over. The try was awarded by the video referee and the conversion was kicked by Jeremy Smith, so New Zealand led 32 to 24 with 5 minutes of the match remaining. The Kiwis got one more try, again from Lance Hohaia throwing a long ball out to Manu Vatuvei to cross untouched on the left wing once more, his fourth try for the night. Benji Marshall took the sideline conversion attempt and missed, but the game was already beyond doubt, with New Zealand winning 36–24.

Manu Vatuvei's four tries saw him break the record of three previously held by Robbie Paul and Lesley Vainikolo for most tries in a World Cup match by a New Zealand player.

8 November 2008
20:00 ADST (UTC+11:00)

England	24–36	New Zealand
Tries: Rob Burrow (2); Mickey Higham; Martin Gleeson; Goals: Rob Purdham (4)	Report	Tries: Manu Vatuvei (4); Lance Hohaia; Jason Nightingale; Nathan Fien; Goals: Issac Luke (3); Jeremy Smith (1)

Newcastle International Sports Centre, Newcastle
Attendance: 15,145
Referee: Tony Archer (Australia)
Player of the Match: Manu Vatuvei (New Zealand)

England	New Zealand

FB	1	Paul Wellens
LW	2	Mark Calderwood
RC	3	Paul Sykes
LC	4	Keith Senior
RW	5	Lee Smith
SO	6	Martin Gleeson
SH	7	Rob Burrow
PR	8	Adrian Morley
HK	9	Mickey Higham
PR	10	Jamie Peacock (c)
SR	11	Gareth Ellis
SR	12	Jamie Jones-Buchanan
LF	13	Rob Purdham
Substitutions:
IC	14	Kevin Sinfield
IC	15	Ben Westwood
IC	16	Gareth Hock
IC	17	Jamie Langley
Coach:
(Australia) Tony Smith

FB	1	Lance Hohaia
RW	2	Jason Nightingale
RC	3	Steve Matai
LC	4	Jerome Ropati
LW	5	Manu Vatuvei
FE	6	Benji Marshall (c)
HB	7	Thomas Leuluai
PR	8	Adam Blair
HK	9	Nathan Fien
PR	10	Evarn Tuimavave
SR	11	Simon Mannering
SR	12	David Fa'alogo
LK	13	Jeremy Smith
Substitutions:
IC	14	Isaac Luke
IC	15	Greg Eastwood
IC	16	David Kidwell
IC	17	Bronson Harrison
Coach:
(New Zealand) Stephen Kearney

=== Australia vs Papua New Guinea ===
The last time these two teams had met was in 2001 at Port Moresby when Australia defeated Papua New Guinea by 42 points, and it was their first World Cup match since 1992. Papua New Guinea's place in the tournament was at stake, with a win by more than 2 points required. The Kangaroos' undefeated run so far had guaranteed their place in the play-offs so they could afford to experiment with the player lineup for this match. Captain Darren Lockyer and star fullback Billy Slater were rested while four of the Australians were to make their international debuts: Terry Campese taking Lockyer's place at five-eighth, Darius Boyd, David Williams and Anthony Watmough. Karmichael Hunt took Slater's place at fullback.

Australia opened the scoring in the ninth minute when Johnathan Thurston kicked across-field from close range for winger David Williams, making his international debut, to leap for and score in the right corner. Thurston then converted the try so the score was 6 nil. Just over two minutes later Williams crossed in the corner again after receiving a long ball from Karmichal Hunt which was ruled to be forward, so no try was given. Terry Campese, making his debut for Australia was forced to leave the field after receiving a poke in the eye. Australia were attacking close to PNG's line again in the twenty-second minute when the ball was moved out to the other wing where Joel Monaghan forced his way over. The video referee ruled that he'd got the ball down, and after Thurston's second successful kick from near the sideline, this time the left one, the score was 12 nil in favour of the Kangaroos. Less than three minutes later, Australia were again up on the Kumuls' line when quick hands got the ball out to Monaghan and he dived over in the corner untouched for his second try. Thurston's kicking accuracy from difficult angles continued so The Kangaroos had 18 unanswered points. Slick passing before PNG's line resulted in Australia's fourth try as well, this time out to the right for David Williams to cross untouched. Thurston missed his fourth sideline conversion of the night, so the score was 22 nil with three minutes of the first half remaining. No more points were scored before the break.

After holding out Australia's first raid on their line successfully, Papua New Guinea were about to start working their way back up the field when they conceded an easy try to Scott Prince who rushed up to intercept a Stanley Gene pass to score under the posts. Thurston's kick was simple so the score was 28 nil after forty-three minutes. Ten minutes later Australia scored again after keeping the ball alive close to the Kumuls' line, Prince crossing untouched again for his second try. Thurston again kicked the extra two points so the score was 34 nil with twenty-five minutes of the match remaining. In the seventieth minute the Australians, while in their own half, moved the ball out to the right where Williams got it and ran forty metres to score his third try. In doing so he became only the third Kangaroo since Lionel Morgan in 1960 and Brad Mackay in 1990 to score a hat-trick on debut for Australia. Thurston kicked another sideline conversion so it was 40 nil. Papua New Guinea's kick-off was short and they successfully regained the ball. After working their way up into an attacking position close to the Kangaroos' try-line, Ron Griffin put in the perfect grubber kick behind the defence for Menzie Yere to run through and dive on. Wiltshere converted successfully so the score was 40–6 in favour of the home side. Australia scored one more try a few minutes later when Anthony Tupou ran onto a short pass from close range to put the ball down behind the posts. Thurston's kick made the final score 46–6.

The match was the last international for Stanley Gene, the only player to have played in the last three World Cups, who was chaired from the field by his teammates.

9 November 2008
19:00 AEST (UTC+10:00)

Australia	46–6	Papua New Guinea
Tries: David Williams (3); Scott Prince (2); Joel Monaghan; Anthony Tupou; Goals: Johnathan Thurston (7)	Report	Tries: Menzie Yere; Goals: John Wilshire (1)

Willows Sports Complex, Townsville
Attendance: 16,239
Referee: Steve Ganson (England)
Player of the Match: Craig Fitzgibbon (Australia)

Australia	Papua New Guinea

FB	1	Karmichael Hunt
LW	2	Darius Boyd
RC	3	Brent Tate
LC	4	Joel Monaghan
RW	5	David Williams
FE	6	Terry Campese
HB	7	Johnathan Thurston
PR	8	Brent Kite
HK	9	Cameron Smith (c)
PR	10	Josh Perry
SR	11	Anthony Watmough
SR	12	Anthony Tupou
LK	13	Craig Fitzgibbon
Substitutions:
IC	14	Scott Prince
IC	15	Steve Price
IC	16	Paul Gallen
IC	17	Israel Folau
Coach:
(Australia) Ricky Stuart

FB	1	John Wilshere (c)
RW	2	David Mead
RC	3	Menzie Yere
LC	4	Anton Kui
LW	5	Tu'u Maori
FE	6	Stanley Gene
HB	7	Keith Peters
PR	8	Jason Chan
HK	9	Paul Aiton
PR	10	Trevor Exton
SR	11	Neville Costigan
SR	12	James Nightingale
LK	13	Rod Griffin
Substitutions:
IC	14	Kevin Prior
IC	15	Nico Slain
IC	16	Jessie Joe Parker
IC	17	Jay Aston
Coach:
(Papua New Guinea) Adrian Lam
