= 2008 Rugby League World Cup final =

Coordinates: 27°27′53″S 153°0′34″E

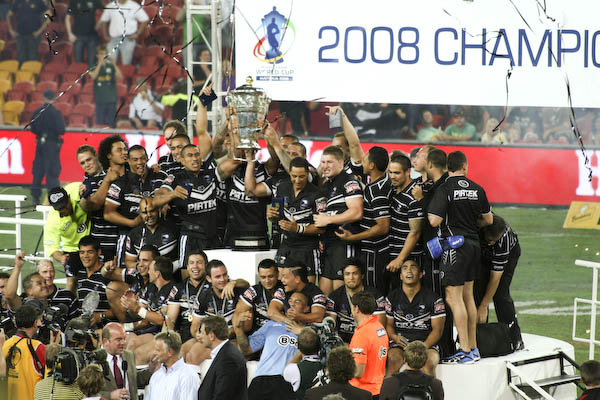
- The New Zealand team celebrating winning the World Cup trophy.
| Australia | New Zealand |
|---|---|
| (ARL) | (NZRL) |
| 20 | 34 |
| | 1 | 2 | Total |
|---|---|---|---|
| AUS | 16 | 4 | 20 |
| NZL | 12 | 22 | 34 |
- Date: 22 November 2008
- Stadium: Lang Park
- Location: Brisbane, Australia
- Man of the Match: Darren Lockyer (Australia)
- Advance Australia Fair: Rebecca Tapia
- God Defend New Zealand: Geoff Sewell
- Referee: Ashley Klein (England)
- Attendance: 50,599

Broadcast partners
- Broadcasters: Nine Network (Australia); Sky Sport (New Zealand); Sky Sports (United Kingdom)
- Commentators: Ray Warren; Phil Gould; Peter Sterling

The 2008 Rugby League World Cup final was the championship-deciding game of the 2008 Rugby League World Cup tournament. Played between New Zealand and Australia on 22 November 2008 at Brisbane's Lang Park, the match was a re-play of the 2000 Rugby League World Cup final and its outcome determined who became World Cup-holders for the following five years. Considered one of the biggest upsets in rugby league, New Zealand defeated Australia 34–20 to claim their first ever World Cup title.

== Background ==
The 2008 Rugby League World Cup was the thirteenth staging of the Rugby League World Cup since its inauguration in 1954, and the first since the 2000 tournament. The tournament was held in Australia from 26 October, culminating in the final between Australia and New Zealand on 22 November. The two teams had played each other once already at this World Cup in the opening ceremony where Australia ran out easy winners.

The match was Australia's tenth consecutive World Cup final having played in each one since the second-ever in 1957, and New Zealand's third.

== Route to final ==
=== Australia ===
Australia went into the final as favourites, having not only won every game of the tournament beforehand, but each with margins ranging from 24 to 52 points.

Scores and results list Australia's points tally first.

| Opposing Team | For | Against | Date | Venue | Attendance | Stage |
|---|---|---|---|---|---|---|
| New Zealand | 30 | 6 | 26 October | Sydney Football Stadium, Sydney | 34,157 | Group stage |
| England | 50 | 4 | 2 November | Docklands Stadium, Melbourne | 36,297 | Group stage |
| Papua New Guinea | 46 | 6 | 9 November | Willows Sports Complex, Townsville | 16,239 | Group stage |
| Fiji | 52 | 0 | 16 November | Sydney Football Stadium, Sydney | 15,855 | Semi-final |

=== New Zealand ===
New Zealand's only defeat going into the final was against Australia in the group stage.

Scores and results list New Zealand's points tally first.

| Opposing Team | For | Against | Date | Venue | Attendance | Stage |
|---|---|---|---|---|---|---|
| Australia | 6 | 30 | 26 October | Sydney Football Stadium, Sydney | 34,157 | Group stage |
| Papua New Guinea | 48 | 6 | 1 November | Robina Stadium, Gold Coast | 11,278 | Group stage |
| England | 36 | 24 | 8 November | Newcastle International Sports Centre, Newcastle | 15,145 | Group stage |
| England | 32 | 22 | 15 November | Lang Park, Brisbane | 26,659 | Semi-final |

== Pre-match ==
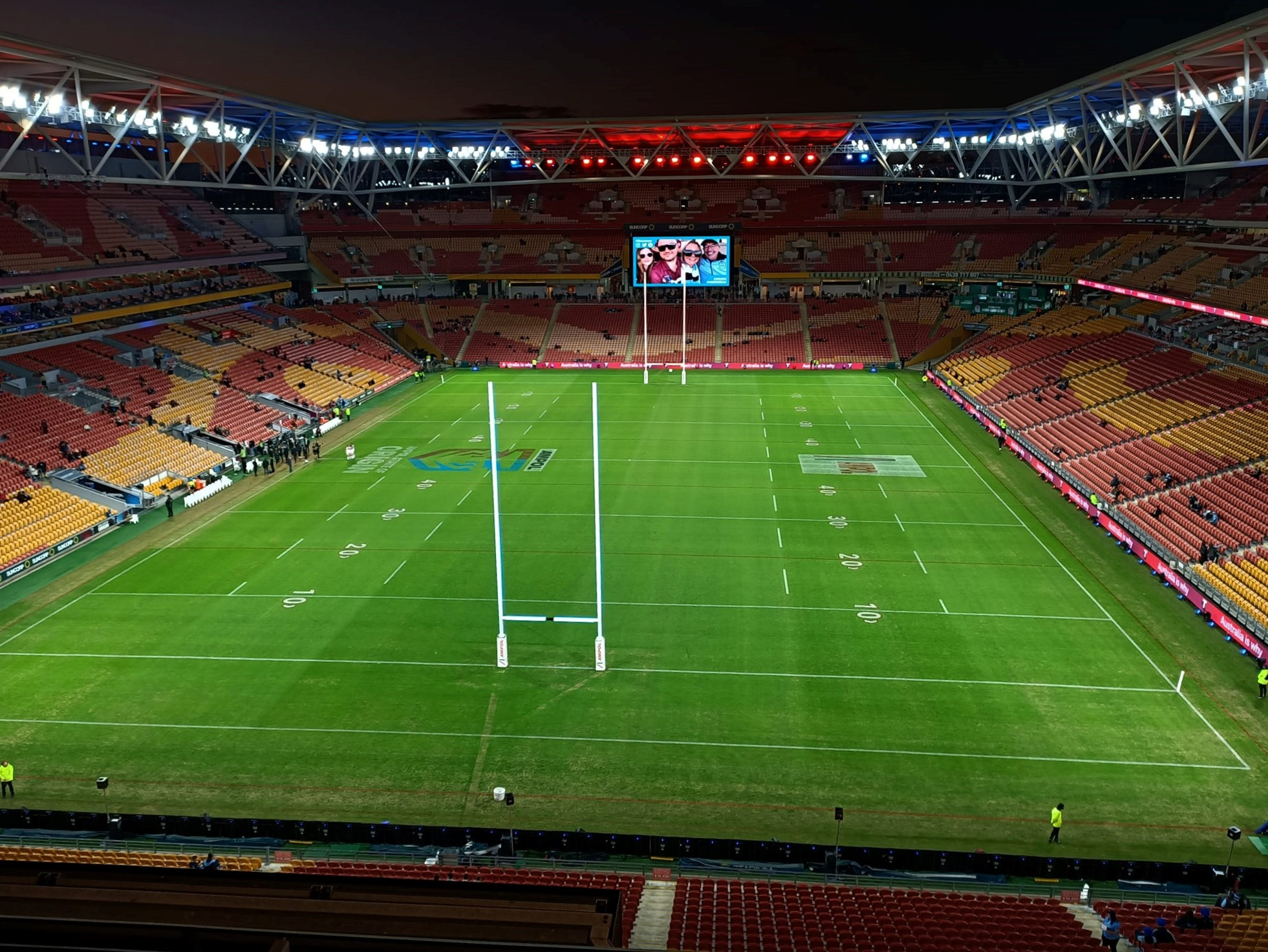
Lang Park in Brisbane hosted its first Rugby League World Cup final

Lang Park was selected as the venue to host the final. Ashley Klein from the Rugby Football League was selected to officiate the match.

Australia went into the match as clear favorites. They had won 9 of the previous 12 tournaments, including the last six consecutively. Australia had also not lost since 2006. New Zealand had won the Tri nations in 2005 but had lost to Australia eight times in a row since that victory. The TAB offered odds of more than 20 to one on a Kiwi win by more than 13 points and New Zealand were paying $6.25 to win at many outlets. Suncorp Stadium was sold out months in advance for the final. The captains of both teams, Nathan Cayless and Darren Lockyer, were the only players in this match who had also played in the 2000 Rugby League World Cup final.

Geoff Sewell performed the New Zealand national anthem, while Rebecca Tapia performed the Australian national anthem. The game started off with the traditional haka after the national anthems. During the haka the Australian team advanced towards the New Zealand team so that they were standing face to face.

== Match ==
=== First half ===
- 1st minute: Australia kicked off to New Zealand who had the first set of six.
- 5th minute: Benji Marshall almost opened the scoring for New Zealand after he ran on to a Nathan Fien grubber. However, he knocked the ball on upon further inspection and the video referee, Steve Ganson ruled no-try.
- 11th minute: New Zealand's good start to the game came to nothing when Billy Slater received the ball on the 40 metre line. He was able to cut through two defenders and run 30 metres before getting a ball away to Darren Lockyer who scored. Johnathan Thurston then missed the conversion. Australia 4–0 New Zealand
- 15th minute: David Williams raced down the right hand touchline to score. Thurston kicked the conversion. Australia 10–0 New Zealand
- 20th minute: Australia had the chance to effectively put the game out of reach when Darren Lockyer looked to have got on the end of a Cameron Smith grubber kick. Yet, when referee Ashley Klein went to the video referee it was clear that Lockyer had not grounded the ball and the try was not awarded.
- 24th minute: Jeremy Smith went on a barnstorming run from ten metres out to score under the posts. Isaac Luke added the conversion and New Zealand were now back in the game. Australia 10–6 New Zealand
- 28th minute: Benji Marshall looked to have lost the ball before David Fa'alogo was able to run away and put Jerome Ropati in to score. However, upon inspection from the video referee the ball was stripped out of Marshall's hands. Therefore, the try stood and, when Luke added the conversion, New Zealand were in the lead for the first time in the match. Australia 10–12 New Zealand
- 35th minute: Multiple passes between the Australian players and Lockyer eventually finds room to go over and score. The conversion was added and Australia were back in the lead. Australia 16–12 New Zealand
- 40th minute: The halftime siren sounded. New Zealand had surprised many by keeping the score close but many would have believed that Australia would have run away with the game in the second half.

At halftime Justin Morgan said on the BBC "It has been a great display from both teams in the first half. The Kiwis have been a little unlucky but they are still in the game and I would like to see them put the ball in the air more in the second half and see if they can get some results."

=== Second half ===
- 41st minute: New Zealand winger Manu Vatuvei is ruled to have put his shoulder on the corner flag as he was going into score a try. Therefore, the try was ruled out.
- 47th minute: Lance Hohaia receives the ball after New Zealand received a penalty and stepped past Lockyer before scoring in the tackle. The conversion was added and New Zealand re-took the lead. Australia 16–18 New Zealand
- 58th minute: Israel Folau is held up over the line after picking up a bouncing ball.
- 59th minute: Lance Hohaia is bundled towards the New Zealand in-goal after Klein had already called held. Therefore, New Zealand are awarded a penalty under their own goal posts.
- 60th minute: On the fourth play, Marshall kicked the ball, Slater gathered it in but, under pressure from Manu Vatuvei, threw the ball in field where Marshall picked the ball up and scored out wide. The kick was unconverted. Australia 16–22 New Zealand
- 64th minute: Australia hit back through a try from Greg Inglis in the corner, Thurston, however, could not add the conversion and New Zealand remained in the lead. Australia 20–22 New Zealand
- 70th minute: Nathan Fien grubber kicked the ball through on the last tackle. Lance Hohaia, who was on side ran through to try to catch the ball. The ball bounced awkwardly above the head of the Australian defender Joel Monaghan who could only react by putting out a swinging arm. The ball was then taken by Slater who was tackled in the in goal. After several looks from the video referee it was decided that Hohaia probably would have scored had he not been tackled so a penalty try was awarded. The conversion which would be taken from right under the posts was kicked and New Zealand had an eight-point lead. Australia 20–28 New Zealand
- 72nd minute: With the Australians desperate to score Thurston make a line break but with an open line in front of him is ankle tapped by Jeremy Smith and Thurston knocked on. Time was now running out for Australia.
- 75th minute: Fien kicks for the corner but the ball came loose before Adam Blair eventually picked up and scored. After some looks at the video it was clear that it was a fair try. The conversion was added and New Zealand had effectively won the world cup.
- 80th minute: The siren for full-time went and the New Zealand players started celebrating. Australia 20–34 New Zealand

=== Details ===
22 November 2008
19:00 AEST (UTC+10:00)

| Australia | 20–34 | New Zealand |
|---|---|---|
| Tries: Lockyer 11', 35'; Williams 15'; Inglis 64'; Goals: Thurston (2/4) | Report | Tries: Hohaia 53', 70' (pen.); Smith 24'; Ropati 28'; Marshall 60'; Blair 75'; Goals: Luke (3/3); Marshall (2/3) |

Lang Park, Brisbane
Attendance: 50,599
Referee: Ashley Klein (England)
Player of the Match: Darren Lockyer

| Australia | New Zealand |

| FB | 1 | Billy Slater |
| RW | 2 | Joel Monaghan |
| RC | 3 | Greg Inglis |
| LC | 4 | Israel Folau |
| LW | 5 | David Williams |
| FE | 6 | Darren Lockyer (c) |
| HB | 7 | Johnathan Thurston |
| PR | 15 | Brent Kite |
| HK | 9 | Cameron Smith |
| PR | 10 | Petero Civoniceva |
| SR | 11 | Anthony Laffranchi |
| SR | 12 | Glenn Stewart |
| LF | 13 | Paul Gallen |
Substitutions:
| IC | 14 | Karmichael Hunt |
| IC | 16 | Anthony Tupou |
| IC | 17 | Craig Fitzgibbon |
| IC | 22 | Anthony Watmough |
Coach:
(Australia) Ricky Stuart

| FB | 1 | Lance Hohaia |
| RW | 2 | Sam Perrett |
| RC | 3 | Simon Mannering |
| LC | 4 | Jerome Ropati |
| LW | 5 | Manu Vatuvei |
| FE | 6 | Benji Marshall |
| HB | 7 | Nathan Fien |
| PR | 8 | Nathan Cayless (c) |
| HK | 9 | Thomas Leuluai |
| PR | 10 | Adam Blair |
| SR | 11 | David Fa'alogo |
| SR | 12 | Bronson Harrison |
| LF | 13 | Jeremy Smith |
Substitutions:
| IC | 14 | Issac Luke |
| IC | 15 | Greg Eastwood |
| IC | 16 | Sam Rapira |
| IC | 17 | Sika Manu |
Coach:
(New Zealand) Stephen Kearney

== Post-match ==
The game was the Australian team's first loss since Great Britain defeated them in November 2006 and their first loss to New Zealand since November 2005. It was also their first loss in a World Cup match since 1995 and in a final since 1972. 1.2 million Australians watched the game live on television.

Ricky Stuart, coach of the Australian team, was reported to be so incensed by his team's defeat in the final that he verbally attacked Geoff Carr, the Chief Executive of Australian Rugby League, claiming that tournament organisers and match officials conspired to cause the Australian loss. The next morning he had a chance meeting with Ashley Klein, who refereed the final, and Stuart Cummings, the Rugby Football League's director of match officials, at their hotel. He reportedly abused both officials in front of a number of witnesses, calling Klein a cheat, and behaved in an aggressive and physically intimidating manner. Stuart later apologised for his behaviour and resigned from his post.

Hundreds of New Zealanders welcomed the team home at Auckland Airport. The Kiwis were nominated for team of the year in the Halberg Awards but lost to the gold medal rowing pair of Caroline and Georgina Evers-Swindell.
