= Vatuvei =

Vatuvei is a surname. Notable people with the surname include:

- Luatangi Vatuvei (born 1977), Tongan-born Japanese rugby union footballer
- Manu Vatuvei (born 1986), New Zealand rugby league footballer
- Sione Vatuvei (born 1983), Tongan-born Japanese rugby union footballer
