= Luatangi =

Luatangi is a given name. Notable people with the given name include:

- Luatangi Li (born 1991), New Zealand-born Tongan rugby union player
- Luatangi Vatuvei (born 1977), Tongan-born Japanese rugby union player
