= David Williams (rugby league, born 1986) =

Australia international rugby league footballer

David "Wolfman" Williams
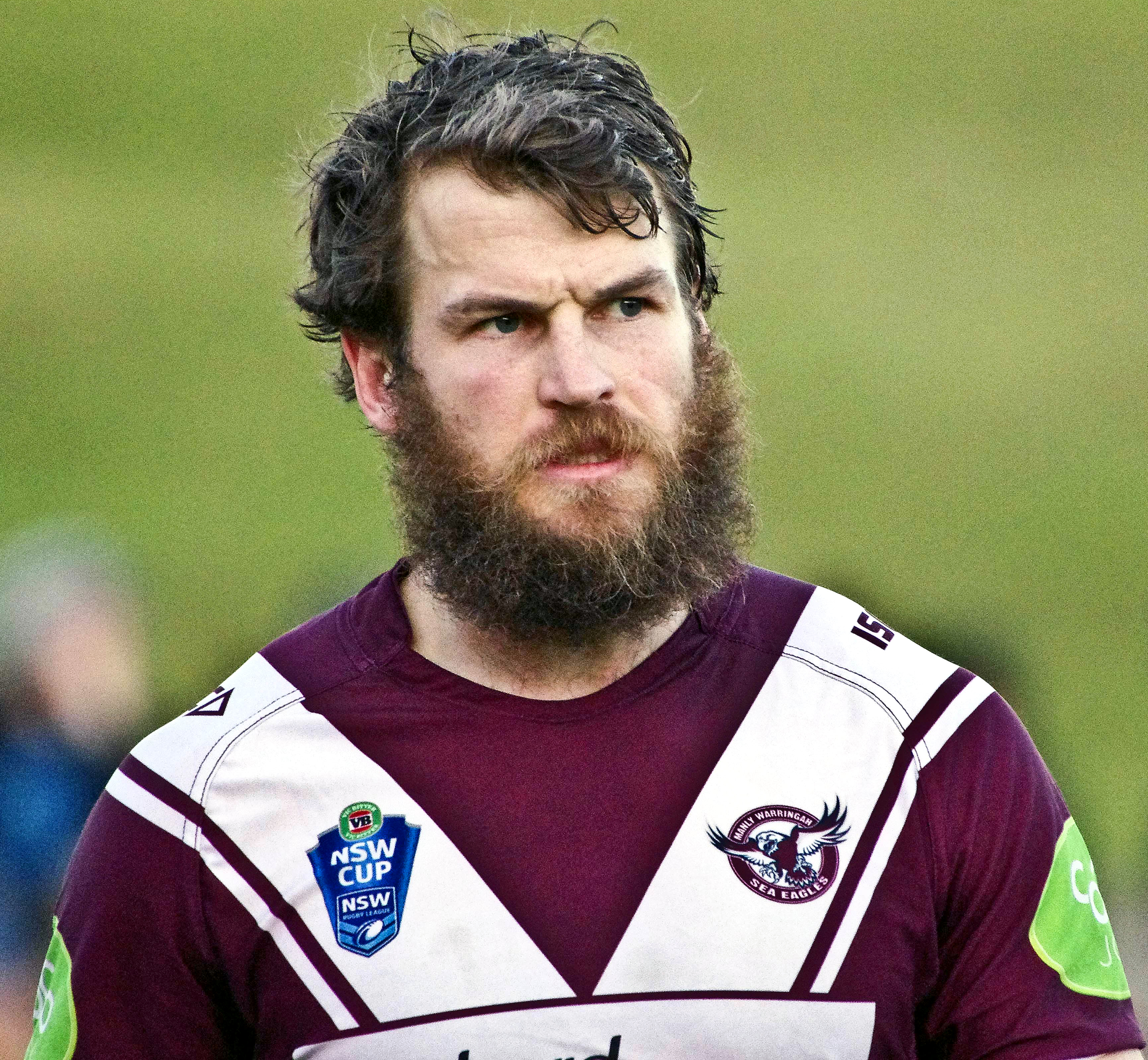
- Williams in 2015

Personal information
- Full name: David Williams
- Born: 4 August 1986 (age 40) Sydney, New South Wales, Australia
- Height: 183 cm (6 ft 0 in)
- Weight: 92 kg (14 st 7 lb)

Playing information
- Position: Wing, Fullback
Club
Years	Team	Pld	T	G	FG	P
2008–15	Manly Sea Eagles	103	66	4	0	272
Representative
Years	Team	Pld	T	G	FG	P
2009	City NSW	1	1	0	0	4
2009	New South Wales	2	2	0	0	8
2008	Australia	2	4	0	0	16
- Relatives: John Williams (brother)

David Williams (born 4 August 1986) is an Australian former professional rugby league footballer who played on the wing in the 2000s and 2010s. A New South Wales State of Origin and Australia international representative, he played his entire professional career with the Manly-Warringah Sea Eagles in the NRL, winning the 2008 NRL Premiership with them.

== Background ==
He is the younger brother of former Parramatta Eels, Sydney Roosters, North Queensland Cowboys and Cronulla-Sutherland Sharks winger, John Williams.

== Professional playing career ==
=== 2000s ===
Williams was a Parramatta junior, playing for the Hills District Bulls based at Baulkham Hills, North-West Sydney.

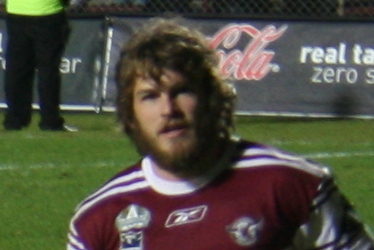
Williams playing for Manly

In 2008, Williams developed a cult following and became known as the "Wolfman" for his shaggy locks and full beard. Williams scored a try in the 2008 NRL Grand Final victory over Melbourne Storm. Following the Manly-Warringah Sea Eagles Grand Final victory, he had his beard removed by Manly teammates as he slept.

In October 2008, Williams was named in the Australia squad for the 2008 Rugby League World Cup. He made his test debut against Papua New Guinea at Dairy Farmers Stadium, scoring 3 tries, becoming one of few players to score a hat-trick on debut in the green and gold, making a long break to score one of the tries. Due to a hip flexor injury to teammate Brent Tate, Williams was chosen to play in the World Cup final against New Zealand on 22 November 2008.

He played on the wing in Manly's 28–20 win over the Leeds Rhinos at Elland Road in the 2009 World Club Challenge match on 1 March. Williams along with some Manly teammates dyed his beard pink for the Women of League Round to raise money for charity, in their match against the Penrith Panthers in round 13 2009.

He was selected for City in the City vs Country match on 8 May 2009.

He made his New South Wales debut on the wing in State of Origin 2 played on 24 June 2009. Unfortunately for Williams and his NSW teammates, Queensland won the game 24–14, and the series. Williams scored a try in each of the two games he played.

=== 2010s ===
In round 25 of the 2011 NRL season, Williams broke his neck against Melbourne and was ruled out for the rest of season, missing out on Manly's 24–10 win over the New Zealand Warriors in the 2011 NRL Grand Final. He was given 3 to 4 months to recover.

Williams made his return to top flight football on 17 February 2012 for Manly-Warringah when they again traveled to England to face the Leeds Rhinos in the 2012 World Club Challenge match, this time at the Rhinos' home ground Headingley Carnegie Stadium. The Wolfman came through the match without further neck problems but his return was spoiled by his opposite number Ryan Hall who scored 2 tries in a Man of the Match performance (including a 95m intercept try in the 27th minute when Williams looked set to score in the corner) that helped Leeds reverse the 2009 result with a 26–12 win.

The Wolfman enjoyed a stellar year in 2013 for Manly-Warringah club and finished the minor round as the seasons equal leading try scorer having crossed for 19 tries. Williams won the award along with David Simmons from Penrith and James McManus of the Newcastle Knights.

Williams played in the 2013 NRL Grand Final loss against Sydney Roosters in which the player endured a horror night. Firstly Williams was out jumped for the ball in the first half by Daniel Tupou which led to a try. In the second half, Williams failed to kick the ball dead as roosters player Michael Jennings raced past him to score the winning try.

On 10 July 2014, Williams was banned from playing in the NRL for the rest of the 2014 NRL season following revelations he had bet on matches.

Williams returned to the Manly-Warringah squad in 2015, scoring the winning try in Manly's ANZAC Day match against Melbourne. He was named captain of Manly's NSW Cup team where he played at Fullback. He retired at the end of the season.

== Statistics ==
Year	Team	Games	Tries	Goals	Pts
2008	Manly Warringah Sea Eagles	20	14	2	60
2009	Manly Warringah Sea Eagles	18	11		44
2011	Manly Warringah Sea Eagles	12	8		32
2012	Manly Warringah Sea Eagles	16	12		48
2013	Manly Warringah Sea Eagles	27	20		80
2014	Manly Warringah Sea Eagles	7			
2015	Manly Warringah Sea Eagles	3	1	2	8
	Totals	103	66	4	272

The filming process was very different to preparing for a rugby league game.
It's a lot easier than running at Sam Burgess.

— Williams on his first acting role in 2013.

== Outside football ==
Williams made his acting debut in 2013 in Tropfest short film finalist Darkness Comes in which he plays a wolf man. Apart from his work in the field Williams works as a part-time model. He has done modelling for Calvin Klein and the charity calendar, Gods of Football.
