= Trevor Exton =

PNG international rugby league footballer

Personal information
- Born: 8 November 1981 (age 44)
- Height: 1.83 m (6 ft 0 in)
- Weight: 220 lb (100 kg)

Playing information
- Position: Prop, Second-row
Club
Years	Team	Pld	T	G	FG	P
2009–10	Sheffield Eagles	38	5	0	0	20
Representative
Years	Team	Pld	T	G	FG	P
2005	PNG Prime Minister's XIII	1	0	0	0	0
2007–08	Papua New Guinea	3	0	0	0	0
- Source: Rugby League Project As of 9 November 2023

Trevor Exton (born 8 November 1981) is a Papua New Guinean rugby league footballer, who played for the Sheffield Eagles in England. He plays as a second-row or prop forward. He played for the Ipswich Jets in 2008.

He was named in the PNG squad for the 2008 Rugby League World Cup, and he played in all three of Papua New Guinea's matches.

In 2012 Exton signed with the Mackay Cutters.
