= George Keppa =

PNG international rugby league footballer

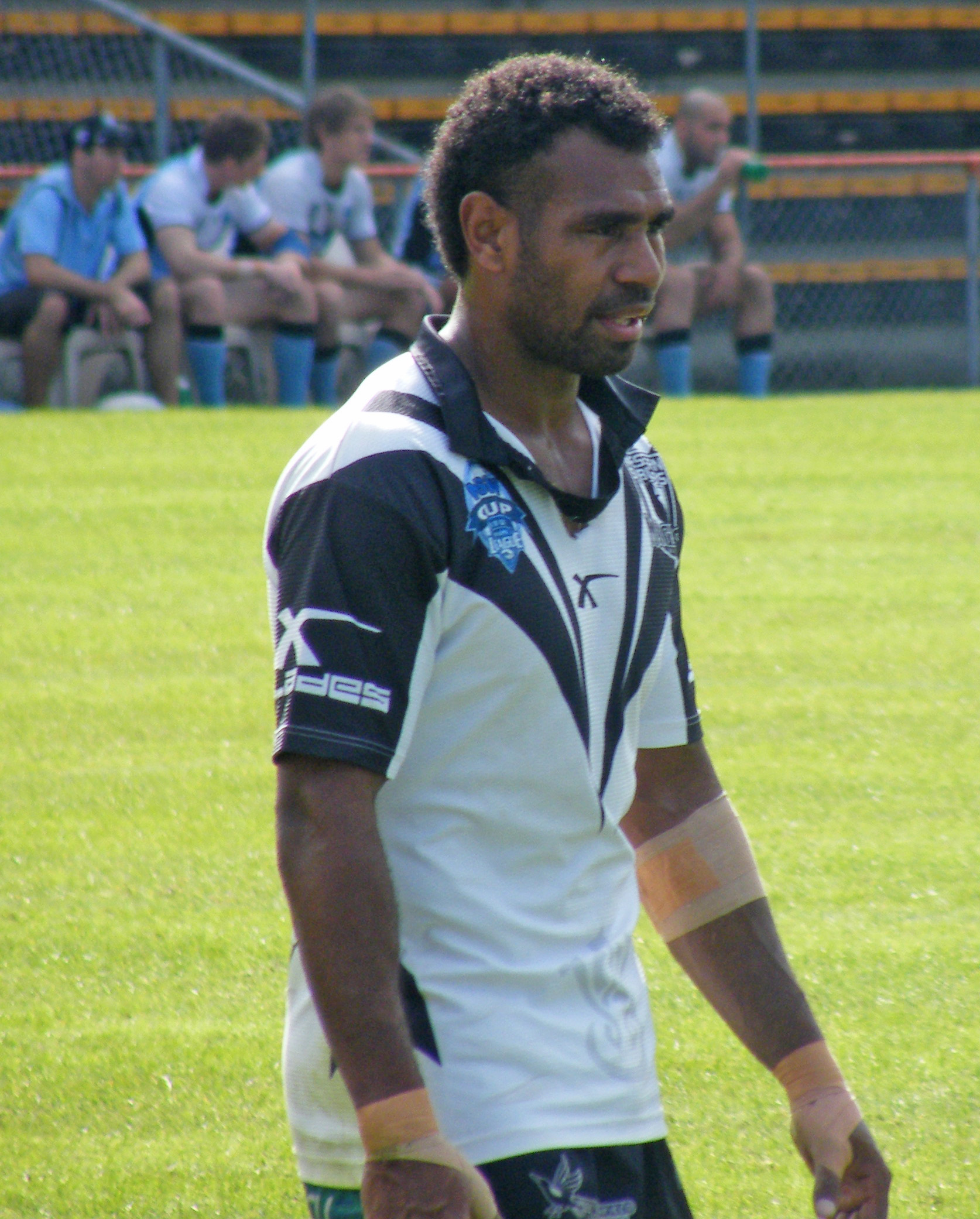

Personal information
- Born: 29 May 1985 (age 40)

Playing information
- Position: Wing
Representative
Years	Team	Pld	T	G	FG	P
2007–08	Papua New Guinea	4	2	0	0	8
- Source: RLP

George Keppa is a professional rugby league footballer who plays on the wing for Brisbane Norths in Australia. He is a Papua New Guinea international.

He has been named in the Papua New Guinea training squad for the 2008 Rugby League World Cup.

He has been named in the PNG squad for the 2008 Rugby League World Cup.
