= Kevin Prior =

PNG international rugby league footballer

Personal information
- Full name: Kevin Prior
- Born: 9 June 1980 (age 44); Lae, Papua New Guinea
- Height: 197 cm (6 ft 6 in)
- Weight: 104 kg (16 st 5 lb)

Playing information
- Position: Prop, Second-row
Representative
Years	Team	Pld	T	G	FG	P
2007–08	Papua New Guinea	4	1	0	0	4

Kevin Prior (born 9 June 1980) is a Papua New Guinean rugby league footballer who plays as a prop or second-row forward for Wentworthville in the A Grade Sydney Competition, he is also captain. He also plays for Wentworthville in the Jim Beam Cup. He has also played for the Papua New Guinea national rugby league team in 2007 and played for All Whites (now Brothers) in the Toowoomba Rugby League competition. Standing at 197 cm and weighing 104 kg.

== Background ==
Kevin Prior was born in Lae, Morobe Province, Papua New Guinea.

== Playing career ==
He made his International debut for PNG in 2007 against Wales coming off the bench. He also featured for PNG in their final Pool match against Australia in Townsville in the 2008 World Cup.

He has been named in the Papua New Guinea training squad for the 2008 Rugby League World Cup.

He has been named in the PNG squad for the 2008 Rugby League World Cup.
