= Manu Vatuvei =

New Zealand and Tonga international rugby league footballer

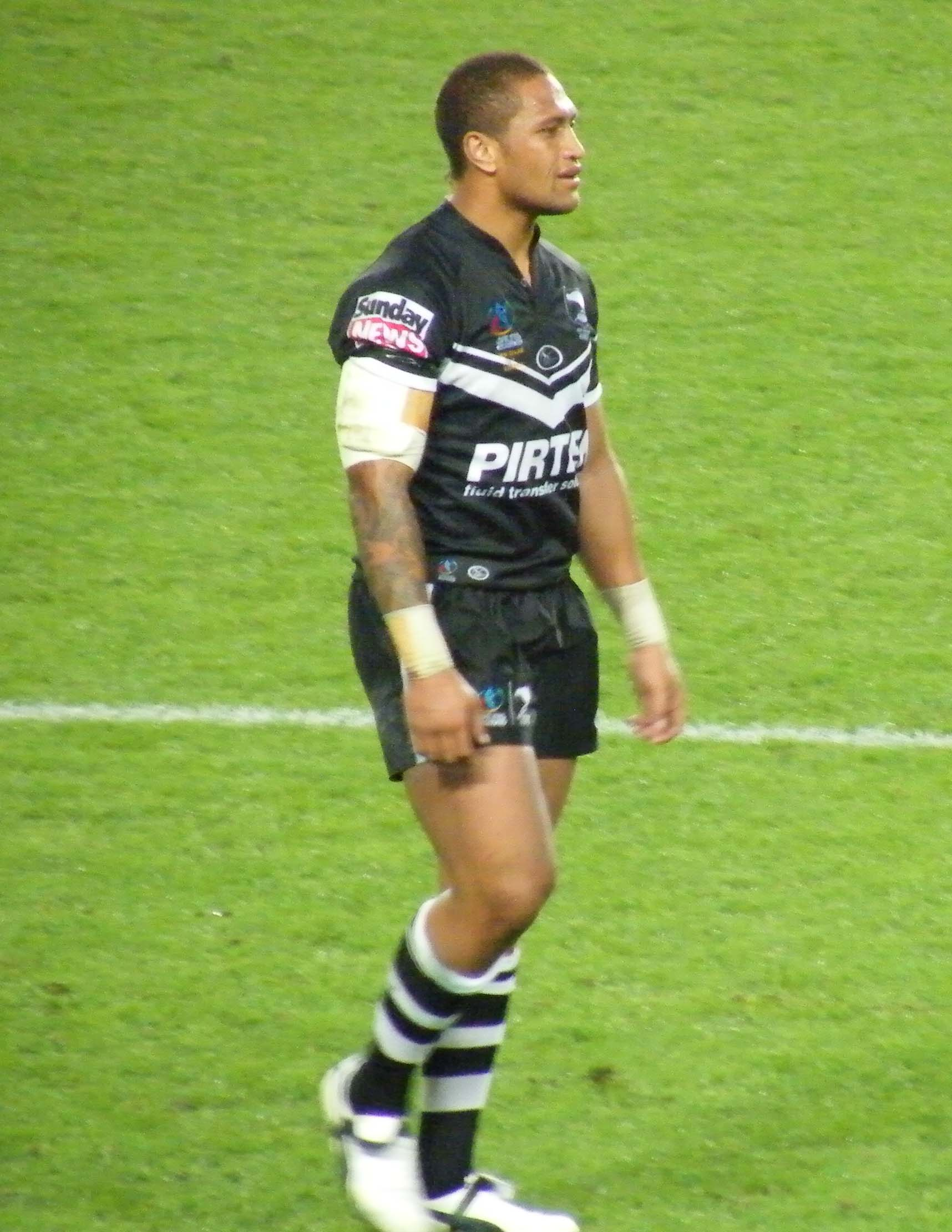

Personal information
- Full name: Manu Mapuhola Mafi-Vatuvei
- Born: 4 March 1986 (age 40) Auckland, New Zealand

Playing information
- Height: 189 cm (6 ft 2 in)
- Weight: 112 kg (17 st 9 lb)
- Position: Wing
Club
Years	Team	Pld	T	G	FG	P
2004–17	New Zealand Warriors	226	152	0	0	608
2017–18	Salford Red Devils	8	5	0	0	20
	Total	234	157	0	0	628
Representative
Years	Team	Pld	T	G	FG	P
2005–15	New Zealand	29	22	0	0	88
2010–15	NRL All Stars	3	1	0	0	4
2017	Tonga	2	1	0	0	4
- Relatives: Luatangi Vatuvei (cousin); Sione Vatuvei (cousin)

Manu Mapuhola Mafi-Vatuvei (born 4 March 1986), also known by the nickname "The Beast", is a former professional rugby league footballer who was both a Tonga and New Zealand international representative winger. He previously played for the New Zealand Warriors in the NRL and for the Salford Red Devils in the Super League. Vatuvei was a member of the New Zealand national team that won the 2008 World Cup. He became the Warriors' top try scorer, and the first player in NRL history to score at least 10 tries in 10 consecutive seasons.

== Early years ==
Born in Auckland, New Zealand, on 4 March 1986, Vatuvei is of Tongan descent. He grew up in the same Ōtara neighbourhood as Ruben Wiki and attended Sir Edmund Hillary Collegiate. His cousin is Tongan-Japanese rugby union player Ruatangi Vatuvei. Vatuvei played for the Otara Scorpions and Otahuhu Leopards in Auckland Rugby League competitions before playing for the Otahuhu Ellerslie Leopards in the Bartercard Cup. When he was only 16 he joined the New Zealand Warriors development squad.

== NRL career ==
=== 2004–2009 ===
Vatuvei made his NRL debut for the New Zealand Warriors in Round 11 against the South Sydney Rabbitohs on the wing in the Warriors 26–12 win at Sydney Football Stadium. He played in 5 matches in his debut year.

In Round 4 of the 2005 season, against the South Sydney Rabbitohs at Mt Smart Stadium. Vatuvei scored his first NRL career try in the Warriors' 46–14 win. Vatuvei finished the year with him playing in 12 matches and scoring 9 tries for the Warriors. In the post season, Vatuvei made his international debut for New Zealand against Australia on 16 October 2005. It was the opening game of the Tri-Nations, where the Kiwis beat the Kangaroos 38–28 at ANZ Stadium. Vatuvei later went on to play in the 2005 Tri-Nations final, scoring two tries on the way to a 24–0 victory over Australia at Elland Road Stadium in Leeds. Vatuvei played 5 matches and scored 3 tries in the series.

Vatuvei finished the 2006 NRL season with 10 tries from 18 matches. In the post season, he was selected for the New Zealand Tri-Nations squad playing in 5 matches and scoring 2 tries, including playing in the Kiwis 16–12 golden point extra time loss to Australia in the final.

Vatuvei was selected to play for the New Zealand on the wing in the 2007 Anzac Test match against Australia, scoring a try in the Kiwis 6–30 loss. After playing in 23 matches, Vatuvei was joint top try scorer for the Warriors alongside Jerome Ropati and Michael Witt with 10 tries in the 2007 NRL season.

In the 2008 season, Vatuvei suffered a broken leg in Round 7 against the Gold Coast Titans, Vatuvei returned from injury to help the Warriors push for the playoffs. Needing to beat the Eels in the last round of the regular season, Vatuvei scored a hat-trick of tries, as the Warriors convincingly won 28–6 to qualify in 8th spot and book a match against minor premiers Melbourne Storm. In the finals series, The Warriors won 18–15 at Olympic Park, where the Storm had only lost twice in three seasons. Vatuvei scored one of the Warriors three tries and was denied another by a forward pass ruling. With the Warriors trailing 15–14 in the 78th minute, he received an offload from Jerome Ropati and busted several tackles over a run of 40m before passing to Michael Witt who sprinted 20m to score the match-winning try. Vatuvei scored another try in the Warriors 30–13 elimination semi-final victory over the Sydney Roosters at Mt Smart Stadium, the game that qualified the Warriors for the preliminary final against the Manly Sea Eagles, which they later lost 32–6 at SFS.

Vatuvei was named in the New Zealand squad for the 2008 World Cup. He went on to star in the tournament, breaking New Zealand's World Cup record for most tries in a match with four against England.

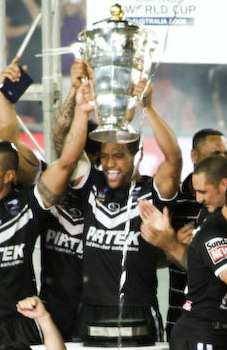
Vatuvei lifting the World Cup in 2008

Vatuvei went on to play in the first New Zealand team to win the World Cup, defeating Australia in the final. Vatuvei played in 5 matches and scored 4 tries in the tournament. He was named International Winger of the year in 2008.

Vatuvei was selected to play for New Zealand on the wing in the 2009 Anzac Test match against Australia, scoring a try in the 38–10 loss.

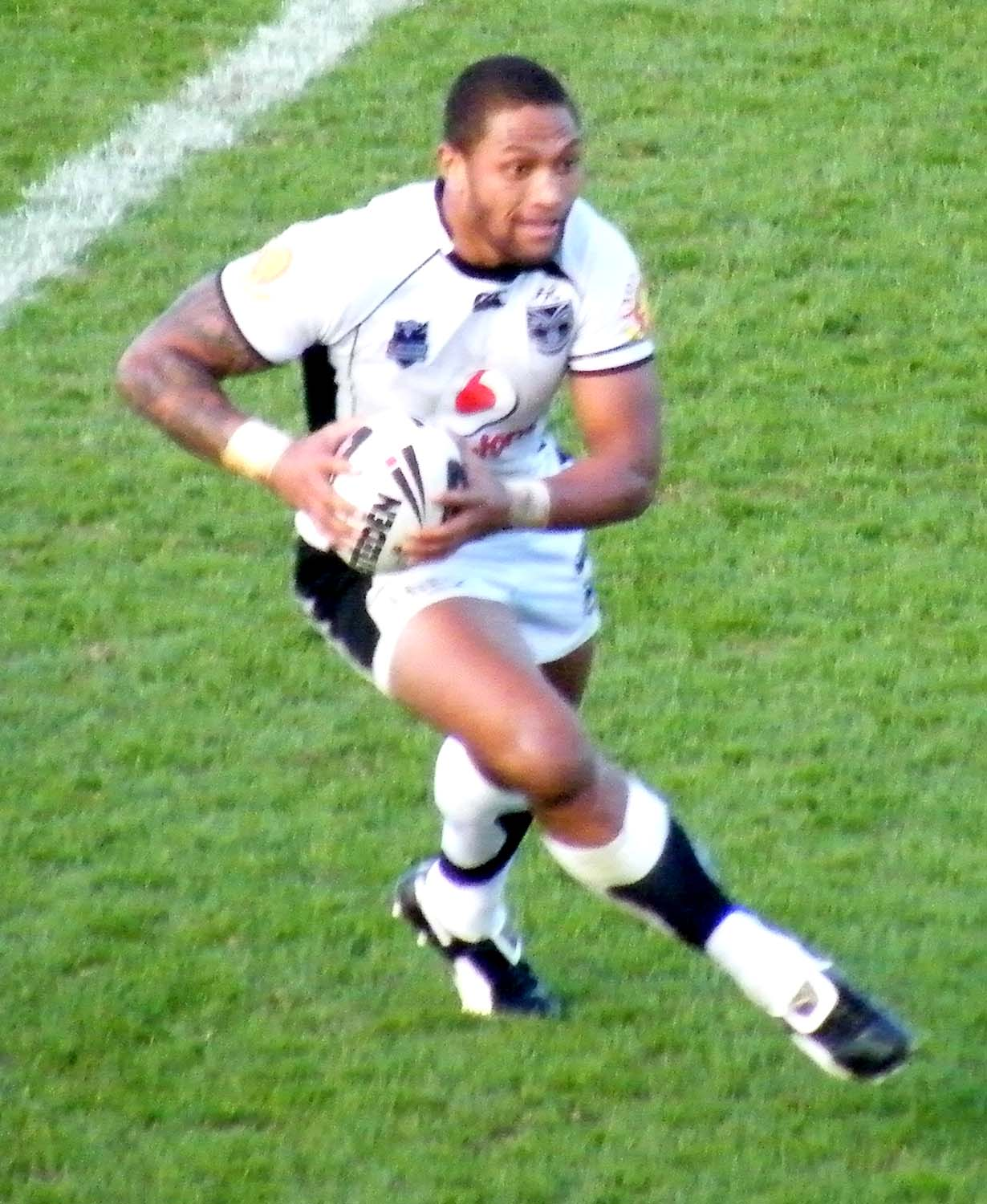
Vatuvei playing for the Warriors in 2009

The Warriors failed to make the finals, but Vatuvei finished the season as the club's top try-scorer with 13 tries in 19 matches in the 2009 NRL season.

=== 2010–2017 ===
On 13 February, Vatuvei played for the NRL All Stars in the inaugural All Stars match at Skilled Park. In Round 13 against the St George Illawarra Dragons at Mt Smart Stadium, Vatuvei played his 100th NRL career match as the Warriors lost 20–22. On 24 August, Vatuvei announced that he had extended his Warriors contract until the end of the 2013 season. Vatuvei surpassed Stacey Jones' club record of 77 tries in the first week of play-off matches against the Gold Coast Titans; the Warriors lost the match 28–16 at Skilled Park. He was the Warriors highest tryscorer for the 4th year in a row with 20 tries in 19 matches. In the post season, Vatuvei was selected for the New Zealand Four Nations squad.

Vatuvei scored his 90th NRL try for the Warriors in the 2011 NRL Grand Final against the Manly-Warringah Sea Eagles in the Warriors 24–10 losing effort, Vatuvei's first and only Grand Final appearance to date. He was the Warriors highest tryscorer for the 5th year in a row with 12 tries in 19 matches. Vatuvei missed the 2011 Four Nations series after failing medical tests.

On 4 February, Vatuvei played for the NRL All Stars in the 2012 All Stars match, scoring a try in the All Stars' 36–28 win. He played for New Zealand in the 2012 Anzac Test match as the Kiwis lost 12–20. Due to an injury to captain Simon Mannering, Vatuvei captained the side for several games between Rounds 21 and 25. In Round 24 against the Penrith Panthers at Mt Smart Stadium, Vatuvei played his 150th NRL career match in the Warriors 18–16 loss. In Round 23 against the North Queensland Cowboys at 1300SMILES Stadium, Vatuvei became the first player to score 100 tries for the club, in the Warriors shellacking 52–12 loss. Along with Shaun Johnson and Konrad Hurrell, Vatuvei was the New Zealand Warriors season's top try-scorer with 12 tries in 20 matches in the 2012 NRL season. Vatuvei, usually the Kiwis winger, was not picked for the October test against Australia.

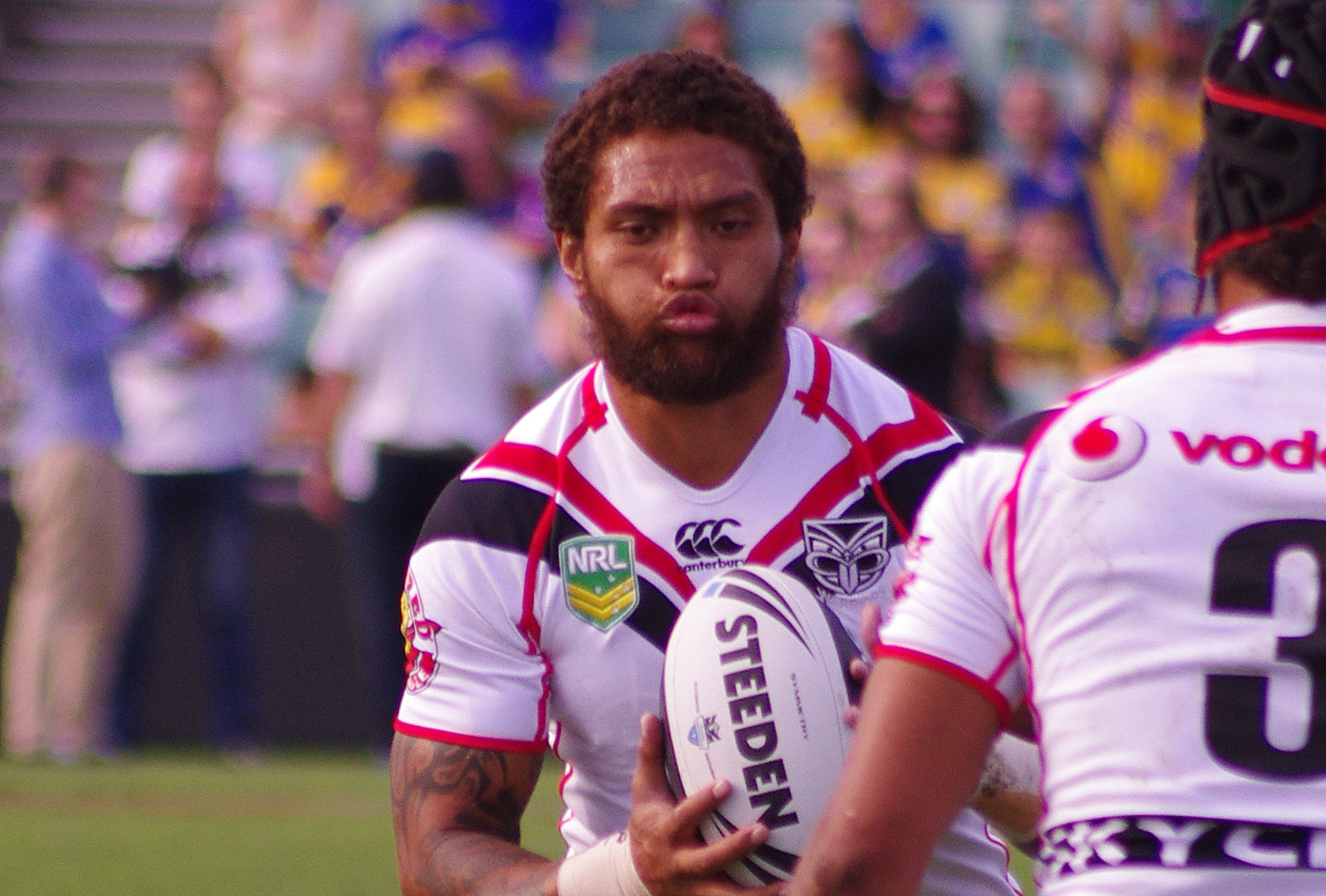
Vatuvei playing for the New Zealand Warriors in 2013

On 8 May 2013, Vatuvei extended his contract with the Warriors to the end of the 2015 season. He was the Warriors highest tryscorer for the 7th year in a row with 16 tries in 19 matches. Vatuvei was selected for the New Zealand World Cup squad. In the Kiwis opening game, a 42–24 victory over Samoa at Halliwell Jones Stadium in Warrington, Vatuvei scored a hat-trick. Vatuvei played in the Kiwis 34–2 World Cup final loss against Australia at Old Trafford. He played in 4 matches and scored 4 tries in the series.

Vatuvei finished off the Warriors 2014 NRL season as the Warriors highest tryscorer for the year with 17 tries in 23 matches. On 7 October 2014, Vatuvei was selected in the New Zealand Kiwis' final 24-man squad for the 2014 Four Nations series. In the Four Nations final against Australia, Vatuvei scored two tries. With his second he became the new all-time top try scorer for the Kiwis, breaking Nigel Vagana's record of 19, a record held since 2006.

In the pre-season, Vatuvei played in the Warriors' Auckland Nines. On 13 February, Vatuvei was played for the NRL All Stars in the 2015 All Stars match, a 20–6 loss to the Indigenous All Stars. In Round 6, against the Wests Tigers, Vatuvei played his 200th NRL game, scoring twice in the Warriors 32–22 win at Mt Smart Stadium. In the following week against the North Queensland Cowboys, Vatuvei overtook Nigel Vagana as the most prolific New Zealand try scorer when he touched down for his 141st career try in the Warriors 28–24 loss at 1300SMILES Stadium.

Vatuvei was selected for New Zealand in the 2015 Anzac Test, scoring a try in the Kiwis' 26–12 win. In Round 14 against the Sydney Roosters, Vatuvei became the first player in NRL history to score at least 10 tries in 10 consecutive seasons. He suffered a season-ending shoulder injury in round 22, finishing the season with 16 matches and 11 tries for the Warriors.

In 2016, Vatuvei scored his 150th first grade try, the 11th player to do so and the first New Zealander.

On 6 May 2017, Vatuvei made his debut for Mate Ma'a Tonga and scored a try in the 6th minute of the match in Tonga's 26–24 victory over Fiji at Campbelltown in the 2017 Pacific Test Triple Header. On 10 July, Vatuvei was released from his contract with the New Zealand Warriors and signed a deal with Salford Red Devils. His last appearance for the Warriors was on 14 July 2017, in an emotional farewell at Mt Smart Stadium, temporarily renamed Manu Vatuvei Stadium for the match. His time with Salford didn't last long, being released after only eight games due to picking up an injury in the following preseason.

Vatuvei announced his well rumoured retirement on social media on 15 July 2019; explaining the delay in his decision was due to being unable to accept that his time was up.

== Boxing career ==
Manu Vatuvei
Personal information
- Nickname: The Beast
- Nationality: New Zealand
- Born: 4 March 1986 (age 40) Auckland, New Zealand
- Height: 189 cm (6 ft 2 in)
- Weight: 126.4 kg (279 lb)

Boxing career

Boxing record
- Total fights: 1
- Wins: 1
- Win by KO: 1
- Losses: 0
- Draws: 0

Vatuvei made his boxing debut in the corporate division to raise money for The Prostate Cancer Foundation of NZ on 15 December 2012. He took on Olympic Gold medalist Eric Murray. Vatuvei won the bout by unanimous decision. In November 2018, it was announced that Vatuvei would make his pro boxing debut against Brown Buttabean David Letele. This fight happened exactly six years after his corporate bout. Vatuvei won the bout by Knockout in the first round. Letele announced his retirement after the bout. It was later announced that during prescreening health checks for the match, Vatuvei discovered he had a cyst on the brain, so cancelled all future bouts. For the majority of his boxing bouts, Vatuvei was trained by Monty Betham at Boxing Alley in Auckland, New Zealand.

=== Professional boxing record ===
1 fight	1 win	0 losses
By knockout	1	0
By decision	0	0
Draws	0	

No.	Result	Record	Opponent	Type	Round, time	Date	Location	Notes
1	Win	1–0	(New Zealand) David Letele	KO	1 (4), 0:28	15 December 2018	Horncastle Arena, Christchurch, New Zealand	professional debut

== Importation of methamphetamine ==
In late 2020, media were reporting that a sportsman was facing a number of methamphetamine-related charges, but had ongoing name suppression. On 2 May 2021, Vatuvei announced through his social media that he was the sportsman in the case, and that he had been charged with possessing methamphetamine for supply and importing the Class A drug in December 2019. On 6 October 2021, Vatuvei pleaded guilty to importing methamphetamine into New Zealand and in March 2022 he was sentenced to three years and seven months in prison. Vatuvei's brother was also sentenced on the same charges, and received seven years and two months in prison.

In May 2023, Vatuvei was granted early parole. It was announced that he would take a volunteer role with the Warriors, counseling young players on career decisions and making good choices.

== Personal life ==
Vatuvei married his wife in 2009, and together they have seven children.

== Television ==
In 2019 Vatuvei won Dancing with the Stars (New Zealand series 8).
