= Sione Vatuvei =

Tongan-Japanese rugby union footballer

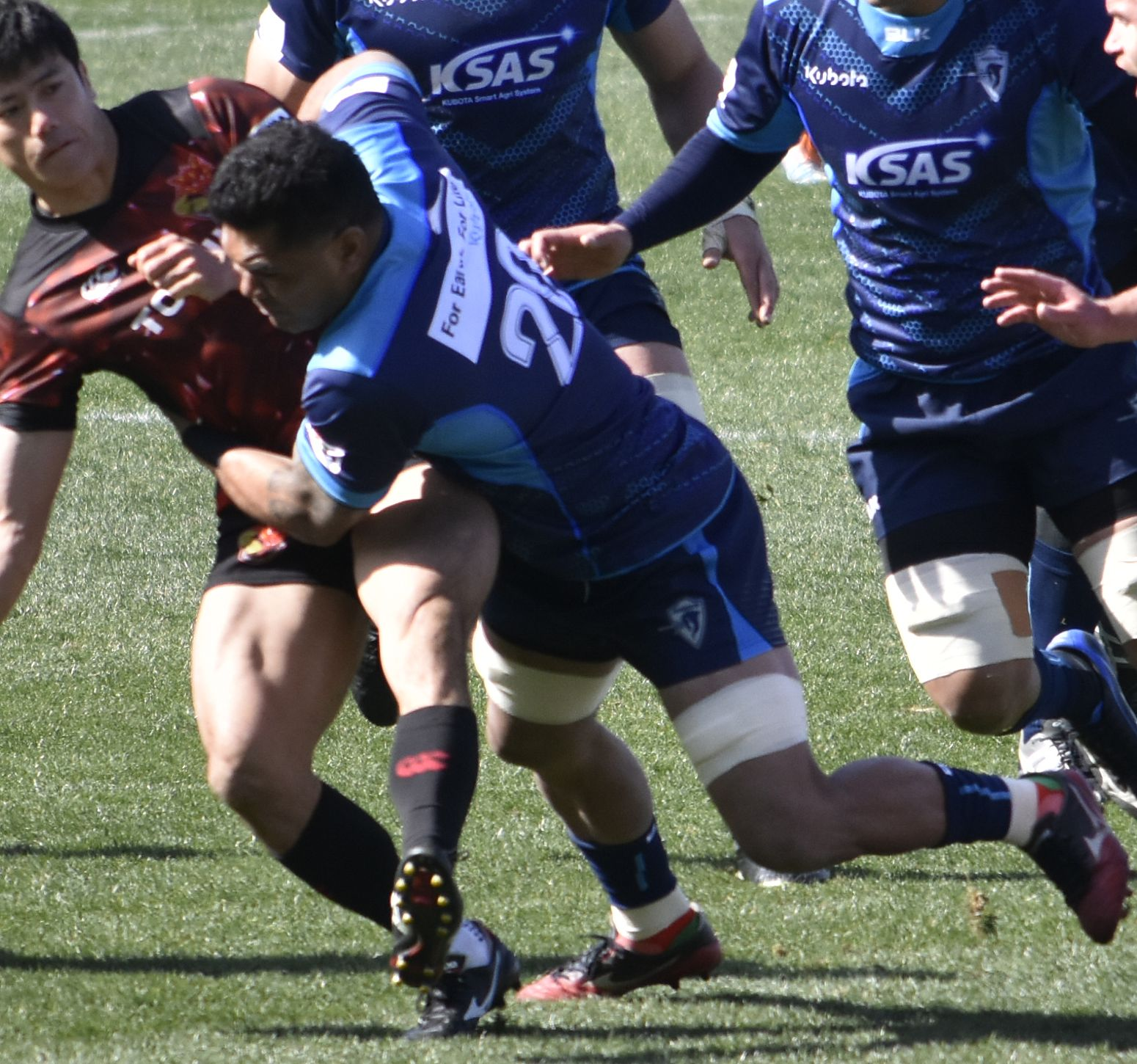
- Sione in 2021
- Full name: Sione Talikavili Vatuvei
- Born: 14 March 1983 (age 43) Nukuʻalofa, Tonga
- Height: 1.88 m (6 ft 2 in)
- Weight: 100 kg (15 st 10 lb; 220 lb)
- School: Nelson College
- Notable relative(s): Luatangi Vatuvei (brother), Manu Vatuvei (cousin)

Rugby union career
- Position(s): Flanker, Number 8, Lock
Youth career
- 2004–2008: Takushoku University
Senior career
Years	Team	Apps	(Points)
2008–2014	Sanyo/Panasonic Wild Knights	65	(90)
2014–2018	Toyota Industries Shuttles	53	(50)
2018–2022	Kubota Spears	28	(30)
- Correct as of 21 February 2021
International career
Years	Team	Apps	(Points)
2010–2011	Japan	8	(10)
- Correct as of 7 December 2016

Sione Talikavili Vatuvei (born 14 March 1983), also known by his middle name Talikavili or Kavili, is a Tongan-born Japanese rugby union footballer. He represented Japan at the 2003 Rugby World Cup. His preferred position is blindside flanker.

He plays in the Top League for Toyota Industries Shuttles in Kariya Aichi where he currently resides.

Vatuvei was educated at Nelson College in New Zealand between 1999 and 2001. He is the youngest brother of former Japanese Rugby union footballer Luatangi Vatuvei. He is also the cousin of former Tongan-New Zealand Rugby league player Manu Vatuvei.
