= Sika Manu =

New Zealand and Tonga international rugby league footballer

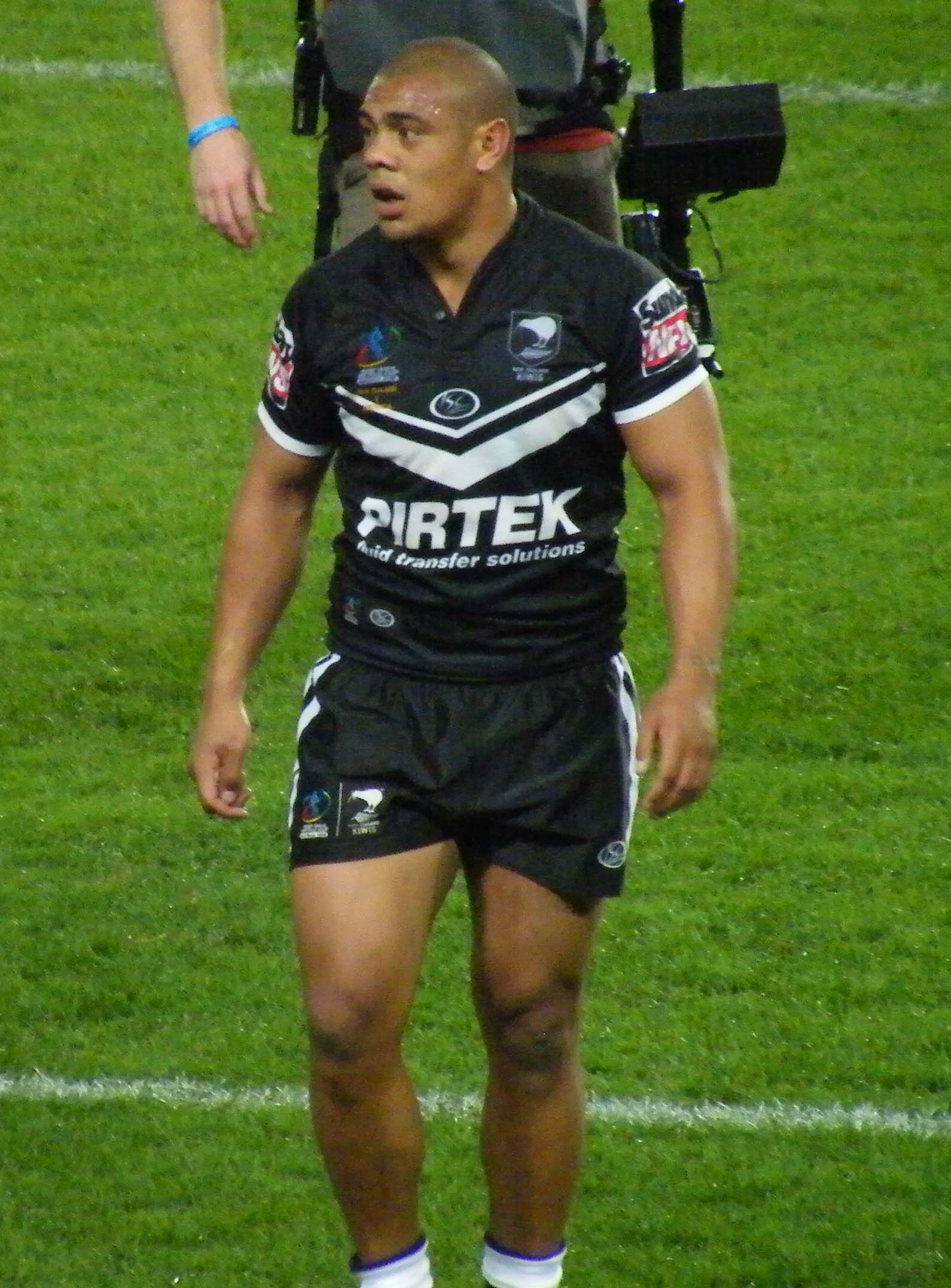

Personal information
- Full name: Viliami Sikalamu Manu
- Born: 22 January 1987 (age 39) Lower Hutt, New Zealand
- Height: 182 cm (6 ft 0 in)
- Weight: 110 kg (17 st 5 lb)

Playing information
- Position: Second-row, Lock
Club
Years	Team	Pld	T	G	FG	P
2007–12	Melbourne Storm	88	17	0	0	68
2013–15	Penrith Panthers	60	6	0	0	24
2016–19	Hull F.C.	104	12	0	0	48
	Total	252	35	0	0	140
Representative
Years	Team	Pld	T	G	FG	P
2008–11	New Zealand	14	4	0	0	16
2013–18	Tonga	13	4	0	0	16
- Source: As of 19 October 2019

Viliami Sikalamu "Sika" Manu (born 22 January 1987) is a former professional rugby league footballer who played as a second-row forward for Tonga and New Zealand at international level, being a member of the World Cup winning Kiwi team who beat Australia in the 2008 World Cup Final.

At club level played for the Melbourne Storm, with whom he won the 2012 NRL Grand Final, and also the Penrith Panthers in the NRL and Hull F.C. in the Super League.

== Background ==
He was born in Wellington, New Zealand.

Manu is of full Tongan descent and as a result is eligible both for New Zealand and Tonga. His older brother Filipe was also contracted to the Storm. He is cousin to the Super 15 Rugby union player from the Highlanders, Nasi Manu. He is also cousin to up and coming Rugby superstar David Manu, located in the Eastern Suburbs.Manu was educated at Upper Hutt College, where he played for the school's First XV rugby team.

== Playing career ==
=== Early career ===
He played for the Randwick Kingfishers, Petone Panthers and the Upper Hutt Tigers in the Wellington Rugby League. Manu was a part of the 2004 Junior Kiwi side who twice defeated the England Under 18s Academy. Following this series, Manu signed a NRL contract with the Melbourne Storm.

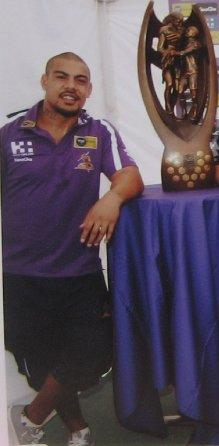
Sika Manu

=== Melbourne Storm ===
Manu made his first National Rugby League (NRL) for the Melbourne Storm in 2007. He has since played over 50 games for the club. He played in the 2008 NRL Grand Final defeat by Manly.

Manu suffered a leg injury in the Storm's 2009 Round 21 clash with the St George Illawarra Dragons, thus ending his season. He ultimately missed the Grand Final win. Manu was selected to play for New Zealand from the interchange bench in their loss against Australia. On 30 September 2012 he became part of the Storm's second premiership title, when they beat the Canterbury-Bankstown Bulldogs 14-4 in the 2012 NRL Grand Final.

=== Penrith Panthers ===
On 5 June 2012 Penrith Panthers General Manager Phil Gould announced that Manu had signed a three-year deal with the Penrith club, commencing from the start of the 2013 National Rugby League season.

=== Hull F.C. ===
On 13 August 2015, he signed a 3-year contract with Super League team Hull F.C. starting in 2016.

He played in the 2016 Challenge Cup Final victory over the Warrington Wolves at Wembley Stadium.

He played in the 2017 Challenge Cup Final victory over the Wigan Warriors at Wembley Stadium.

=== International career ===
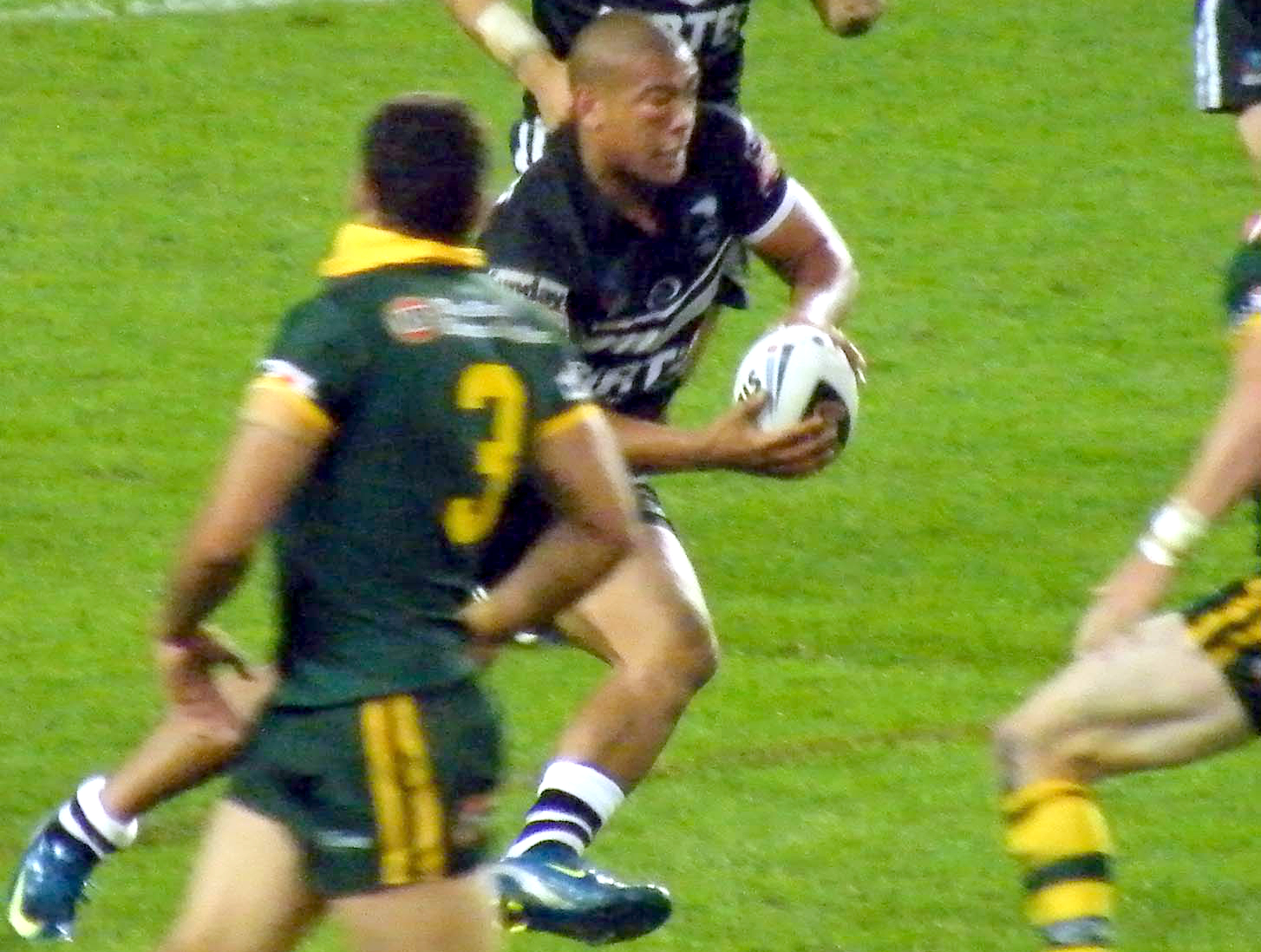
Manu playing for the Kiwis

==== New Zealand ====
Manu made his New Zealand national rugby league team debut in 2008. He was named in the Tongan and New Zealand training squads for the 2008 Rugby League World Cup. In October 2008 he was named in the final 24-man Kiwi squad and was part of the team that went on to win the tournament.

==== Tonga ====
In 2013 Sika, through his Tongan heritage, he made his début for Tonga in their Pacific Rugby League International clash with fierce Pacific rivals Samoa.

Later in the year Sika represented Tonga in their unsuccessful 2013 Rugby League World Cup campaign. He played in all 3 of Tonga's matches, scoring two tries. He scored both of his tries in New Zealand's nail-biting 2 point defeat by Scotland (unfortunately the only defeat of their World Cup campaign which ultimately ended Tonga's hopes of a knock-out round spot).

On 2 May 2015, Manu captained Tonga in their 2015 Polynesian Cup test-match against Pacific rivals Samoa. On 17 October 2015 Manu captained Tonga again this time in their Asia-Pacific Qualifier match against the Cook Islands for the 2017 Rugby League World Cup.

On 7 May 2016, Manu traveled down from Hull to Sydney to captain Tonga in the 2016 Polynesian Cup against Samoa, where he started in the second row in the 18-6 loss at Parramatta Stadium.

In 2018 he announced his retirement from international rugby league.

== Statistics ==
Year	Team	Games	Tries	Pts
2007	Melbourne Storm	3		
2008	Melbourne Storm	24	7	28
2009	Melbourne Storm	10		
2010	Melbourne Storm	14	2	8
2011	Melbourne Storm	18	5	20
2012	Melbourne Storm	19	3	12
2013	Penrith Panthers	20	5	20
2014	Penrith Panthers	23		
2015	Penrith Panthers	17	1	4
2016	Hull FC	29	4	16
2017	Hull FC	32	2	8
2018	Hull FC	18	3	12
2019	Hull FC	25	3	12
	Totals	252	35	140
