= Luatangi Vatuvei =

Japan international rugby union player

- Born: December 8, 1977 (age 48) Tonga
- Height: 1.9 m (6 ft 3 in)
- Weight: 120 kg (260 lb)
- University: Daito Bunka University
- Notable relative(s): Sione Vatuvei (brother), Manu Vatuvei (cousin)

Rugby union career
- Position: Lock
Senior career
Years	Team	Apps	(Points)
2002–2007	Toshiba Brave Lupus		
2007–2009	Kintetsu Liners		
2010	Toyota Industries Shuttles		
International career
Years	Team	Apps	(Points)
2001–2007	Japan	23	(45)

Luatangi Samurai Vatuvei (formerly Ruatangi Vatuvei) (born December 8, 1977) is a Tongan-born Japanese rugby union footballer.

Vatuvei played rugby in Japan for Toshiba Brave Lupus in the Top League and has also played for the Japan national rugby union team under the IRB three-year residence qualification.

Vatuvei is extremely strong, usually in the second row but also used by Toshiba coach Masahiro Kunda in the centres. In 2006, Vatuvei obtained Japanese citizenship.

In 2007, Vatuvei moved from Toshiba to Kintetsu Liners, which was demoted from the Top League in the previous season. This did not prevent John Kirwan from including him in the Japan squad for RWC 2007.

Vatuvei was the top try scorer in the 2004-5 Top League season with 18 tries. He is a cousin of New Zealand rugby league international winger Manu Vatuvei and an elder brother of Tonga rugby union international flanker Sione Vatuvei.
