= Willows Sports Complex =

Stadium in Townsville, Queensland, Australia

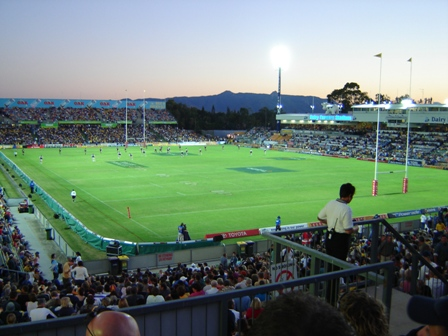
- Stadiums Queensland Rating
- Interactive map of Willows Sports Complex
- Former names: Stockland Stadium; Malanda Stadium; Dairy Farmers Stadium; 1300SMILES Stadium
- Location: Golf Links Drive, Kirwan, Queensland
- Coordinates: 19°18′58″S 146°42′43″E
- Owner: Queensland Government
- Operator: Major Sports Facilities Authority
- Capacity: 26,500
- Surface: Grass
- Record attendance: 30,302 – Cowboys vs Brisbane, 1999

Construction
- Groundbreaking: 1994
- Opened: 1994
- Demolished: September 2022
- Cost: A$11.03 million (2005–06 redevelopment)

Tenants
- North Queensland Cowboys (1995–2019); North Queensland Fury (2009–2011)

The Willows Sports Complex was a grass football stadium situated in Townsville, Queensland, Australia. It was used predominantly as a rugby league ground as the home ground of the North Queensland Cowboys National Rugby League club. The ground was also used for rugby union and soccer. From 2009 to 2011, A-League football club North Queensland Fury called it home.

Since inception as a rugby league ground, the ground had several sponsored naming rights: Stockland Stadium (1995–97), Malanda Stadium (1998) Dairy Farmers Stadium (1999–2013) and 1300SMILES Stadium (2013–2019). The last NRL match to be played at the stadium was on Thursday 29 August 2019 between the North Queensland Cowboys and Canterbury Bankstown Bulldogs.

== History ==
=== Willows Sporting Complex ===
Prior to 1995, the stadium site was occupied by the Willows Sporting Complex. It hosted trotting paceway nights, and was the main pacing venue for the Townsville District. With the admission of the North Queensland Cowboys to the Australian Rugby League competition in 1995, the Willows site was transformed into a basic rugby league venue with a western grandstand as well as eastern side terraces. The northern and southern ends had sloped grass hills.

=== Stockland Stadium ===
The Willows Sports Complex was renamed "Stockland Stadium" in 1995 through sponsorship linked with the North Queensland Cowboys. A contract was signed by the Stockland Trust Group for three years giving them the naming rights of the venue. The Joint Board of the old Willows Sports Complex (Townsville City Council and Thuringowa City Council) sub-leased the facility to the Cowboys Rugby League Football Limited, who managed the venue on a day-to-day basis. The first stage of development was funded by a combination of borrowings by the Joint Board, the Queensland Government grants and a considerable amount of community and business donations.

The stadium was first used for any type of football for the North Queensland Cowboys first home game which attracted a crowd of 23,156, a good crowd by Australian Rugby League (now National Rugby League) standards. Crowds continued to push the capacity of the stadium and in 1996 Stockland Stadium was renovated to include both northern and southern seating, where previously there had been only standing room.

Stockland Stadium had the honour of hosting the first-ever game of the only Super League season on 1 March 1997 when the Cowboys hosted new team the Adelaide Rams in front of 17,738 fans. After trailing 16–4 at half time the Cowboys eventually prevailed 24–16.

Stockland ended their sponsorship after three years, which paved the way for long-term sponsor, Dairy Farmers Limited.

=== Malanda Stadium ===
The North Queensland Cowboys home stadium sponsor Stockland finished up their sponsorship contract seeing out their three-year deal. A new sponsorship deal was signed with local milking organisation Dairy Farmers who owned the local North Queensland milking dairy in the Tablelands. Season 1998 saw the stadium renamed with a new sponsorship deal "Malanda Stadium". Following the purchase of Malanda Milk by Dairy Farmers, the ground was renamed "Dairy Farmers Stadium".

=== Dairy Farmers Stadium ===
Many stages of redevelopment were taken on and gradually completed over the Cowboys growing success. The venue had changed from a disused Harness Racing facility to the current complex. The management and operation of the stadium was handed over to Stadiums Queensland in December 2003 in the hope for more cash inflow and government spending.

In 2005 the eastern terraces were extended, a new replay screen invested, public address system installed, 30 more corporate boxes and upgraded catering facilities as part of the funding injection. The lighting facilities were upgraded for night time broadcasts. 2006 saw the eastern, northern and southern grandstands receiving even further upgrades with the fitting of extra seating and the eastern terrace was extended completely taking over the old eastern hill.

Two of Papua New Guinea's 2008 Rugby League World Cup Group A games were played at Dairy Farmers Stadium, one against England and the other against Australia.

During the 2011 NRL season a capacity crowd attended Darren Lockyer's record-setting 350th NRL match at the ground.

=== 1300SMILES Stadium ===
It was announced on 19 February 2013 that 1300SMILES had signed a five-year deal for naming rights, bringing Dairy Farmers' fifteen years to an end. 1300SMILES is an Australian dentistry business headquartered in Townsville.

== Replacement ==
A redeveloped stadium was featured as part of Australia's 2022 FIFA World Cup bid. The planning for the bid identified several issues with the existing stadium, particularly sub standard facilities, congestion and limited transport access. Stadiums Queensland identified that some form of redevelopment or replacement was necessary regardless of the failed World Cup bid. In 2011, the Cowboys in conjunction with Stadiums Queensland developed a $185 million plan to replace the ageing Dairy Farmers Stadium. The proposed ground would be located at the Saunders Street QR National site close to the Townsville CBD, as part of an urban renewal plan. The existing QR National rail yards are to be relocated in accordance with the Townsville Port Authority Master Plan 2010–2040.

In 2016 a replacement was funded by the Queensland State Government and the Federal Government, the resulting North Queensland Stadium began construction in 2017, with the opening in February 2020, with the first event being an Elton John concert, and the North Queensland Cowboys rugby league team hosting its first game in Round 1 of the 2020 NRL Season against Queensland rivals the Brisbane Broncos.

As at early 2020 the future of the stadium is still unclear with prior reports suggesting it could be used for a new school or redeveloped for housing.

Throughout the COVID-19 pandemic in Queensland, the carpark at the stadium was used for a drive-through coronavirus assessment clinic.

On 25 January 2022, Queensland Premier Annastacia Palaszczuk announced a $30 million investment to turn the stadium into a state-of-the-art Queensland Police hub.

The stadium was demolished in 2023, after work commenced in September 2022.

== Attendance records ==
Crowd	Date	Event	Sport
30,302	29 April 1999	North Queensland Cowboys v. Brisbane Broncos	Rugby league
30,250	8 August 1998	North Queensland Cowboys v. Brisbane Broncos	Rugby league
30,122	5 April 1997	North Queensland Cowboys v. Brisbane Broncos	Rugby league

== Uses ==
=== Rugby league ===
1300SMILES Stadium was predominantly used as a rugby league ground, having been the home ground of the North Queensland Cowboys in the National Rugby League competition, and the North Queensland Young Guns in the Queensland Cup competition. The stadium also hosted an Australian Test match against Papua New Guinea in 2000, an Australian XIII match in 2005, the Super League World 9's tournament in 1997 and charity fixtures with State of Origin Legend matches and Australia Legends v New Zealand Legends. It also hosted England vs Papua New Guinea in the 2008 Rugby League World Cup.

With 2012 being an Olympic year and the games being held in London, the annual Rugby League Four Nations, usually held at the end of the NRL season, was not scheduled as a result. This has resulted in an end-of-year test between Australia and New Zealand being scheduled to be held at the Dairy Farmers Stadium on 13 October for its first international match since the 2008 World Cup.

==== Rugby League Test Matches ====
List of rugby league test matches played at the stadium.

Test#	Date	Result	Attendance	Notes
1	7 October 2000	Australia def. Papua New Guinea 82–0	21,000	
2	25 October 2008	England def. Papua New Guinea 32–22	10,780	2008 Rugby League World Cup Group A
3	8 November 2008	Australia def. Papua New Guinea 46–6	16,239	2008 Rugby League World Cup Group A
4	13 October 2012	Australia def. New Zealand 18–10	26,497	
5	28 October 2017	Fiji def. United States 58–12	5,103	2017 Rugby League World Cup Group D
6	5 November 2017	Italy def. United States 46–0	7,732	2017 Rugby League World Cup Group D
7	5 November 2017	Fiji def. Wales 72–6	7,732	2017 Rugby League World Cup Inter-group match

=== Rugby union ===
The stadium was first used for first class rugby union when the touring British and Irish Lions team played a Queensland President's XV team in 2001. In 2003 a number of matches, which involved Japan in the Rugby Union World Cup were played at the ground, averaging a crowd of 19,249. On 12 May 2006 the Queensland Reds played a Super 14 match at Dairy Farmers Stadium in front of a crowd of 10,580. In June 2007 the stadium hosted Australia A and Japan in the IRB Pacific Nations Cup.

==== Rugby World Cup ====
The Willows Sports Complex hosted three Pool B games from the 2003 Rugby World Cup which was held in Australia.

Date	Competition	Home team		Away team		Attendance
12 October 2003	2003 Rugby World Cup Pool B	Scotland	33	Japan	11	19,170
18 October 2003	2003 Rugby World Cup Pool B	France	51	Japan	29	21,309
23 October 2003	2003 Rugby World Cup Pool B	Fiji	41	Japan	13	17,269

=== Touch Football ===
The North Queensland Cowboys NRL Touch Premiership touch football sides (men's and women's) have played their home games out of 1300SMILES since the premierships inaugural season in 2018. The first games were played on Saturday, 19 May 2018, with both the men's and women's sides taking on the Gold Coast Titans.

=== Football (Soccer) ===
- Australia national under-23 soccer team friendly.
- In 2009, the stadium became home to Townsville's new club, the North Queensland Fury who played in the A-League, the nation's premier soccer competition. Their licence was revoked in March 2011.

=== Other ===
- Kostya Tszyu's World Title boxing qualifier
- Cricket Super 8's state championships
- Crusty Demons tour.
- Elton John performed at Dairy Farmers Stadium on 4 December 2007, as part of his "Knight under the stars" tour.
- Nitro Circus tour
