= Jerome Ropati =

New Zealand rugby league footballer and coach

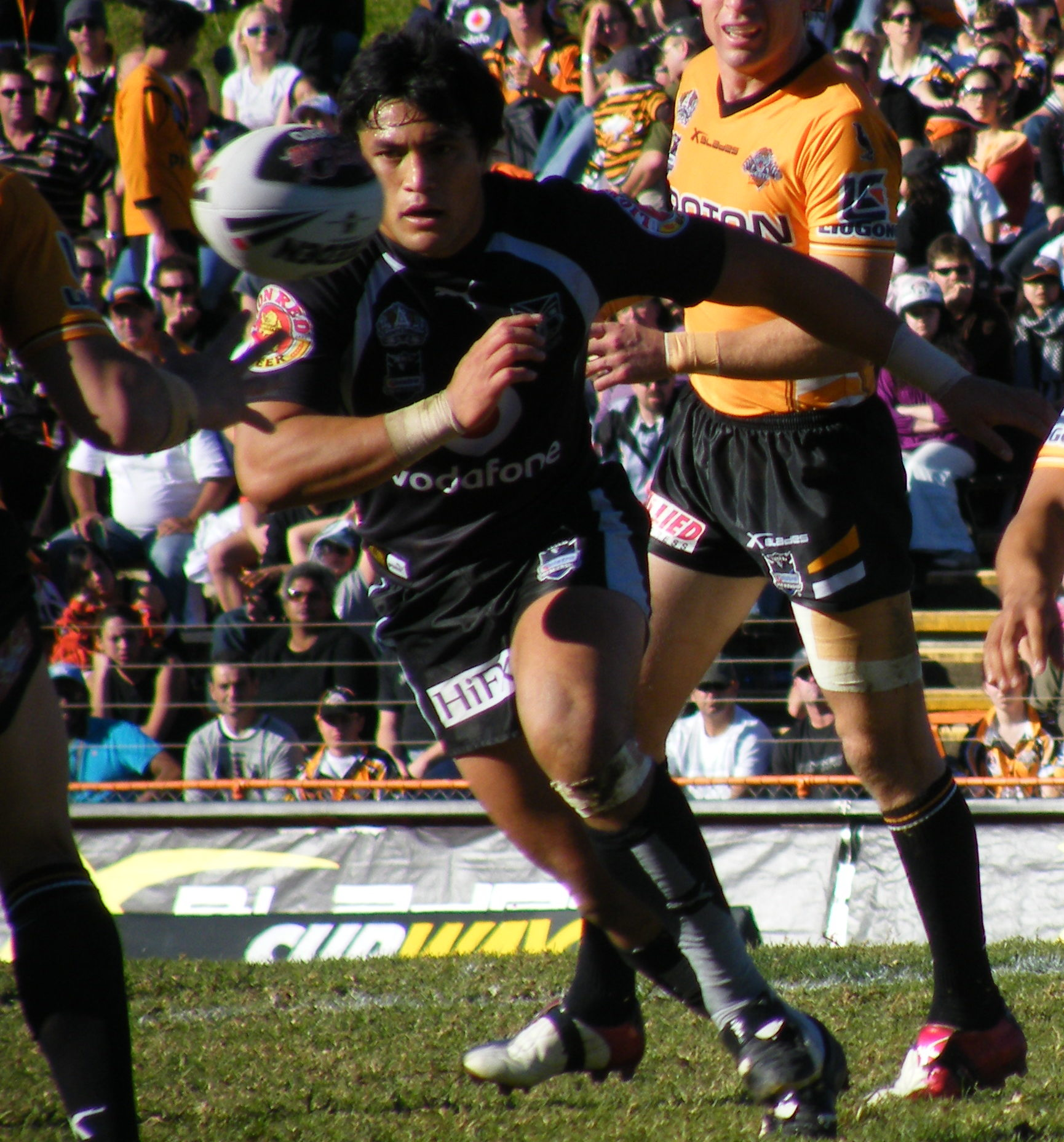

Personal information
- Full name: Jerome Piper Leitu Ropati
- Born: 23 November 1984 (age 41) Auckland, New Zealand

Playing information
- Height: 176 cm (5 ft 9 in)
- Weight: 94 kg (14 st 11 lb)
- Position: Fullback, Centre, Five-eighth
Club
Years	Team	Pld	T	G	FG	P
2003–14	New Zealand Warriors	145	54	0	0	216
2018	Bay Roskill	6	6	2	0	28
	Total	151	60	2	0	244
Representative
Years	Team	Pld	T	G	FG	P
2005–09	New Zealand	11	10	0	0	40

Jerome Ropati (born 23 November 1984) is a New Zealand former professional rugby league footballer who played his entire career for the New Zealand Warriors in the National Rugby League (NRL). Ropati also represented New Zealand, and was a member of the World Cup-winning team in 2008. He played as a centre, and occasionally as a fullback and five-eighth.

== Background ==
Ropati was born in Auckland, New Zealand.

== Early years ==
Ropati is of Samoan descent and was educated at St Paul's College, a school noted for its rugby league teams.

Jerome Ropati's parents are Filipo and Rosa Ropati.

He is no relation to the famous Ropati rugby league family.

== Playing career ==
Ropati's junior club was the Marist Saints and he played for the Marist Richmond Brothers in the Bartercard Cup. It was his 2003 season in the Bartercard Cup that shot him to prominence, as he enjoyed a stellar season and led the club to the grand final. He missed the grand final, which the Brothers lost, because he was making his NRL debut for the Warriors.

In 2002 Ropati was named captain of the Junior Kiwis squad which played two games against touring Australian sides.

=== Warriors ===
He made his first grade debut for the Warriors in round 25 of the 2003 season against the Sydney Roosters. When not selected for the first grade side, Ropati represented the Auckland Lions in both the Bartercard Cup and NSWRL Premier League. He was one of four players who played in every game for the Warriors in 2007.

He made his debut for the New Zealand national rugby league team in 2005 against Australia and was involved in the 2006 Tri Nations. He was a member of the 2008 World Cup winning Kiwis team, that defeated Australia in the Final, with Ropati scoring a try in the match.

In 2009 he extended his Warriors career until the 2012 season, becoming a 10-year Warrior. His 2011 season was ruined by injury as he tore his anterior cruciate ligament (ACL) in round 3. He retired during the 2014 season, following another injury.

== Later years ==
After retirement, Ropati stayed working for the Warriors, becoming a community ambassador. For the 2017 season, Ropati was appointed an assistant coach to the club's Intrust Super Premiership NSW side. In 2018 he put the boots back on and has turned out for the Bay Roskill Vikings in the Sharman Cup, helping them to the Phelan Shield in an unbeaten regular season.
